= Haas (name) =

Haas, also de Haas, is a German and Dutch surname, also Jewish (Ashkenazic), usually from Hase or de Haas, the German and Dutch words for "hare". It is also a given name. Notable people with the surname include the following:

- Andreas Haas (born 1982), German footballer
- Arthur Erich Haas (1884–1941), Austrian physicist
- Barbara Haas (born 1996), Austrian tennis player
- Bénédicte Haas (born 1976), French mathematician
- Bernt Haas (born 1978), Austrian footballer
- Bill Haas (born 1982), American golfer
- Bob Haas (born 1942), American business executive
- Brittany Haas (born 1987), American Fiddler
- Carl Haas (1929–2016), American auto racing impresario
- Charles F. Haas (1913–2011), American film and television director
- Charles S. Haas (born 1952), American screenwriter and actor
- Charlie Haas (born 1972), American wrestler
- Christian Haas (born 1958), German sprinter
- Chrislo Haas (1956–2004), German musician
- Christl Haas (1943–2001), Austrian skier
- Clark Haas (1919–1978), American cartoonist
- Conrad Haas (1509–1576), Austrian military engineer
- Damien Haas (born 1990), German-born American actor
- Daniel Haas (born 1983), German footballer
- Darius de Haas (born 1968), American stage actor and singer
- David Haas (born 1957), American author and composer of liturgical music
- Dolly Haas (1910–1994), German-American actress
- Earle Haas (1888–1981), inventor of the modern menstrual tampon
- Eddie Haas (born 1935), American baseball outfielder and manager
- Eduard Haas (1897–1989), Austrian inventor of Pez candy
- Ernst Haas (1921–1986), Austrian photographer and photojournalist
- Ernst B. Haas (1924–2003), American political scientist
- Felix Haas, German investor
- Frank Joseph Haas, American freemason from West Virginia
- Fred Haas (1916–2004), American golfer
- Friedrich Haas (1924–1945), German fighter pilot
- Fritz Haas (zoologist) (1886–1969)
- Geertruida de Haas-Lorentz (1885–1973), Dutch physicist
- Gene Haas (born 1952), American machine tool manufacturer
- Georg Haas (physician) (1886–1971), German medical doctor
- Georg Friedrich Haas (born 1953), Austrian composer
- Hans Haas (1886–1935), German Protestant theologian
- Harald Haas (born 1968), German professor of Mobile Communications, University of Edinburgh
- Helmut Haas (fl. 1949), discoverer of the Haas effect, a psychoacoustic effect
- Hildegarde Haas (1926–2002), German-born American artist
- Hugo Haas (1901–1968), Czech film actor and director
- Isaac Haas (born 1995), American basketball player
- Jacob de Haas (1872–1937), UK journalist and an early leader of the Zionist movement
- Jay Haas (born 1953), American golfer
- Johann Wilhelm Haas (1649–1723), German trumpet maker
- Josef Haas (1937–2024), Swiss cross country skier
- Joseph Haas (1879–1960), German composer
- Karen L. Haas (born 1962), American government administrator and lobbyist
- Karl Haas (1913–2005), American classical music radio show host
- Karl Wilhelm Jacob Haas (1900–1970), German émigré musicologist and conductor
- Kim Haas, American journalist and television host
- Leonard Haas (1915–1998), American politician from Wisconsin
- Lisbeth Haas (born 1954), American historian and anthropologist
- Lukas Haas (born 1976), American actor
- Mario Haas (born 1974), Austrian footballer
- Marius Haas (born 1945), German journalist and diplomat
- Mary Haas (1910–1996), American linguist
- Mauritz de Haas (1832–1895), Dutch-American marine painter
- Maximilian Haas (born 1985), German footballer
- Michael Haas, multiple people
- Mimi Haas (born 1946), American billionaire businesswoman
- Monique Haas (1909–1987), French pianist
- Moose Haas (born 1956), American baseball player
- Mule Haas (1903–1974), American baseball player
- Nathan Haas (born 1989), Australian cyclist
- Nico de Haas (1907–1995), Dutch editor, photographer, and artist
- Pavel Haas (1899–1944), Czech composer
- Payne Haas (born 1999), Australian rugby player
- Payton Haas (born 1979), American actor
- Peter E. Haas (1918–2005), American businessman
- Peter E. Haas Jr. (born 1948), American businessman and philanthropist.
- Peter M. Haas (born 1955), American political scientist
- Peter W. Haas (born 1964), Slovak photographer
- Radek Haas (born 2000), Czech ice hockey player
- Rene Haas (born 1962), American businessman
- Richard Haas (born 1936), American muralist
- Robert Haas (clergyman) (fl. 1836–1868), German Lutheran minister
- Robert Haas (musicologist) (1886–1960), Austrian musicologist
- Russ Haas (1974–2001), American wrestler
- Sascha Haas (born 1990), German politician
- Saskia Rao-de Haas (born 1971), Dutch cellist of music from India
- Shira Haas (born 1995), Israeli actress
- Sidney V. Haas (1870–1964), American pediatrician and originator of the Specific Carbohydrate Diet
- Thomas J. Haas, American university president
- Tiffany Haas (born c. 1983), American softball player
- Tiphaine Haas (born 1992), French actress
- Tommy Haas (born 1978), German tennis player
- Toxey Haas (born 1960), American businessman
- Wander Johannes de Haas (1878–1960), Dutch physicist and mathematician
- Walter A. Haas (1889–1979), American president and chairman of Levi Strauss & Co.
- Walter A. Haas, Jr. (1916–1995), American president and chairman of Levi Strauss & Co.
- Walter H. Haas, (1917–2015), American astronomer
- Waltraut Haas (1927–2025), Austrian actress and singer
- Werner Haas (1927–1956), German motorcycle racer
- Wilhelm Haas (1896–1981), German diplomat.
- Wolf Haas (born 1960), Austrian author
- Wolfgang Haas (born 1948), Liechtenstein archbishop

== Given name ==
- Haas Visser 't Hooft (1905–1977), Dutch field hockey player

== See also ==
- Haas (disambiguation)
- Hass (surname)
