= Robert Haas =

Robert Haas may refer to:

- Robert Haas (musicologist) (1886–1960), Austrian musicologist
- Robert Haas (calligrapher) (1898–1997), American calligrapher, typographer, photographer and book designer
- Robert Haas (clergyman), German clergyman and ecumenist
- Robert C. Haas, American law enforcement official in Cambridge, Massachusetts
- Robert M. Haas (1889–1962), American art director
- Bob Haas (born 1942), owner and executive of Levi Strauss & Co
- Robert Haas (investor) (1947–2021), American investor, photographer and motorcycle collector
- Robert Z. Haas, American vinter of the Tablas Creek Vineyard
- Bob Haas (American football) (1906–1979), American football player
- Bob Haas (Canadian football), Canadian football player

== See also ==
- Robert Hass (born 1941), American poet
- Robert Bernard Hass (born 1962), American poet, literary critic, and professor
