= Hass (surname) =

Hass (or Haß) is a German surname. Notable people with this surname include the following:

- Amira Hass (born 1956), Israeli journalist and author
- Eric Hass (1905–1980), American politician and Socialist Labor party presidential candidate
- Hans Hass (1919–2013), Austrian biologist and diving pioneer; husband of Lotte Hass
- Hedwig Haß (1902–1992), German fencer and Olympic competitor
- Hieronymus Albrecht Hass (1689–1752), German harpsichord maker; father of J. A. Hass
- Joel Hass (born ?), American mathematician and professor
- Johann Adolph Hass (1713–1771), German clavichord maker; son of H. A. Hass
- Karl Hass (1912–2004), German SS lieutenant-colonel during World War II
- Lotte Hass (1928–2015), Austrian diver and underwater model; wife of Hans Hass
- Ludwik Hass (1918–2008), Polish historian
- Mark Hass (born 1956), American politician
- Mike Hass (born 1983), American football player
- Ray Hass (born 1977), South African born Australian swimmer
- Robert Hass (born 1941), American poet laureate and translator
- Robert Bernard Hass (born 1962), American literary critic, author, and poet
- Rudolph Hass (1892–1952), American horticulturist, developer of the Hass avocado
- Siegfried Haß (1898–1987), German Wehrmacht general during World War II
- Steve Hass (born 1975), American drummer
- Walter Hass (1911–1987), American football coach and athletic director
- Wilbert H. Hass (1906-1959), American paleontologist
- Yvette Hass (born 1985), Swedish fashion designer and business woman

== See also ==
- Haas (surname)
