= Peter Haas =

Peter Haas may refer to:

== Academics ==
- Peter J. Haas (rabbi) (born 1948), American rabbi, professor at CWRU, and leader of Scholars for Peace in the Middle East
- Peter M. Haas (born 1955), American political scientist
- Peter J. Haas (computer scientist) (born 1956), American academic and operations researcher

== Sportsmen ==
- Pete Haas, American golfer who won the 1946 Monroe Invitational
- Peter Haas, Australian rally car navigator in 1970 Australian Rally Championship
- Peter Haas, Austrian canoeist whose team won gold medals at 1975 and 1977 Wildwater Canoeing World Championships
- Peter Haas (athlete) (born 1955), Swiss Olympic sprinter

== Others ==
- Peter Haas (engraver) (1754–1804), German-Danish engraver
- Peter E. Haas (1918–2005), American businessman, CEO of Levi Strauss
- Peter E. Haas Jr. (born 1947), his son, American businessman and philanthropist
- Peter W. Haas (born 1964), Slovak art photographer
- Peter Haas, German drummer, member of Mekong Delta from 1991 to 1998
- Peter D. Haas, American diplomat
