= Alessandra Paonessa =

Canadian soprano from Toronto (born 1989)

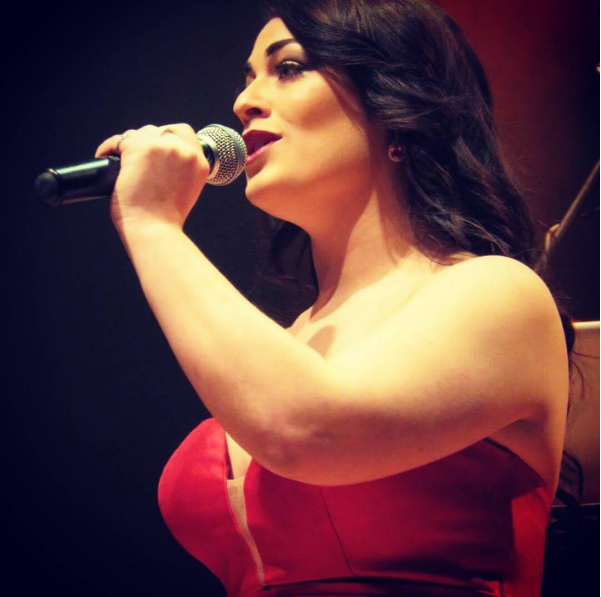
- Alessandra Paonessa, on the 2016 G4 tour

Background information
- Born: July 24, 1989 (age 36)
- Origin: Toronto, Ontario, Canada
- Genres: Classical, opera, crossover music
- Labels: Independent Dell'Alto Records

Alessandra Paonessa (born July 24, 1989) is a Canadian soprano from Toronto. Her 2014 debut album Remembering Heaven, a collaboration featuring the works of British composer Chris Broom, reached number 25 in the UK Official Classical Artist Album Charts Top 50.

== Early life ==
Paonessa began to take voice lessons at the young age of 10 and performed her first official recital at the age of 15. She later joined the Bach Children's group, traveling across Canada taking part in festivals, performing regularly at the Toronto Centre for the Arts and performed for Queen Elizabeth II, on her royal tour to Canada in 2004. A former member of the Young Artist Performance Academy and The Royal Conservatory of Music, she was the winner of many performance festivals and awards in her youth. Paonessa is an alumna of OperaWorks Emerging Artist Program and graduate of York University, where she received the Sterling Beckwith Award, a scholarship given to students who demonstrate exceptional promise and ability in performance.

== Career ==
In 2012 Paonessa made her European debut as both Eumete and Guinone in Academia Europea Dell'Opera's production of Il ritorno d'Ulisse in patria (Monteverdi). Other roles include First Witch (Dido and Aeneas) with York University, Fiordiligi (Così fan tutte) with Toronto Summer Opera Workshop and First Boy in Oshawa Opera's production of The Magic Flute.

In 2014 Paonessa was contacted by British composer Chris Broom who invited her to sing his original composition, "Dolce Vento". This later resulted in a long term partnership and the release of her debut album Remembering Heaven which they produced together that same year. The album features eight original works composed by Chris Broom as well as a selection of well known classical songs. The album was released in November 2014 by Dell'Alto Records, and later won several awards including Global Music Awards 'Best Album' and Hollywood Music in Media's 'Best Female Vocal Performance'.

In 2015 Paonessa made her UK debut at the historic Tremfan Hall, Llanbedrog, Wales, in the Oceans Unite concert with teenage singers British soprano Scarlett Quigley and tenor Charlie Botting in support of the Royal National Lifeboat Institution. and returned in the spring of 2016 to support Britain's X-Factor runners-up group G4 on their Back for Good Tour across England.

== Discography ==
- November 2014: Remembering Heaven, including "Ai Giochi Addio", "Nella Fantasia".

== Awards and nominations ==
- 2015: Gold Medal for Remembering Heaven – Best Album and Vocalist in the Global Music Awards.
- 2015: Best Female Vocalist for "Dolce Vento" – Hollywood Music in Media Awards.
- 2015: Best Classical or Instrumental – Toronto Independent Music Awards.
- 2015: Best Female Classical Artist for "Ai Giochi Addio" – The Radio Music Awards.
- 2015: Vocal Performance Finalist for "Dolce Vento" – Unsigned Only Music Competition.

== Philanthropy ==
Paonessa is an ambassador for "Hope for Hearts", a project in support of The Hospital for Sick Children Foundation, an organization that inspires communities to invest in health and scientific research to improve the life of children and families in Canada and abroad.
