= Brad Mays =

American film director (born 1955)

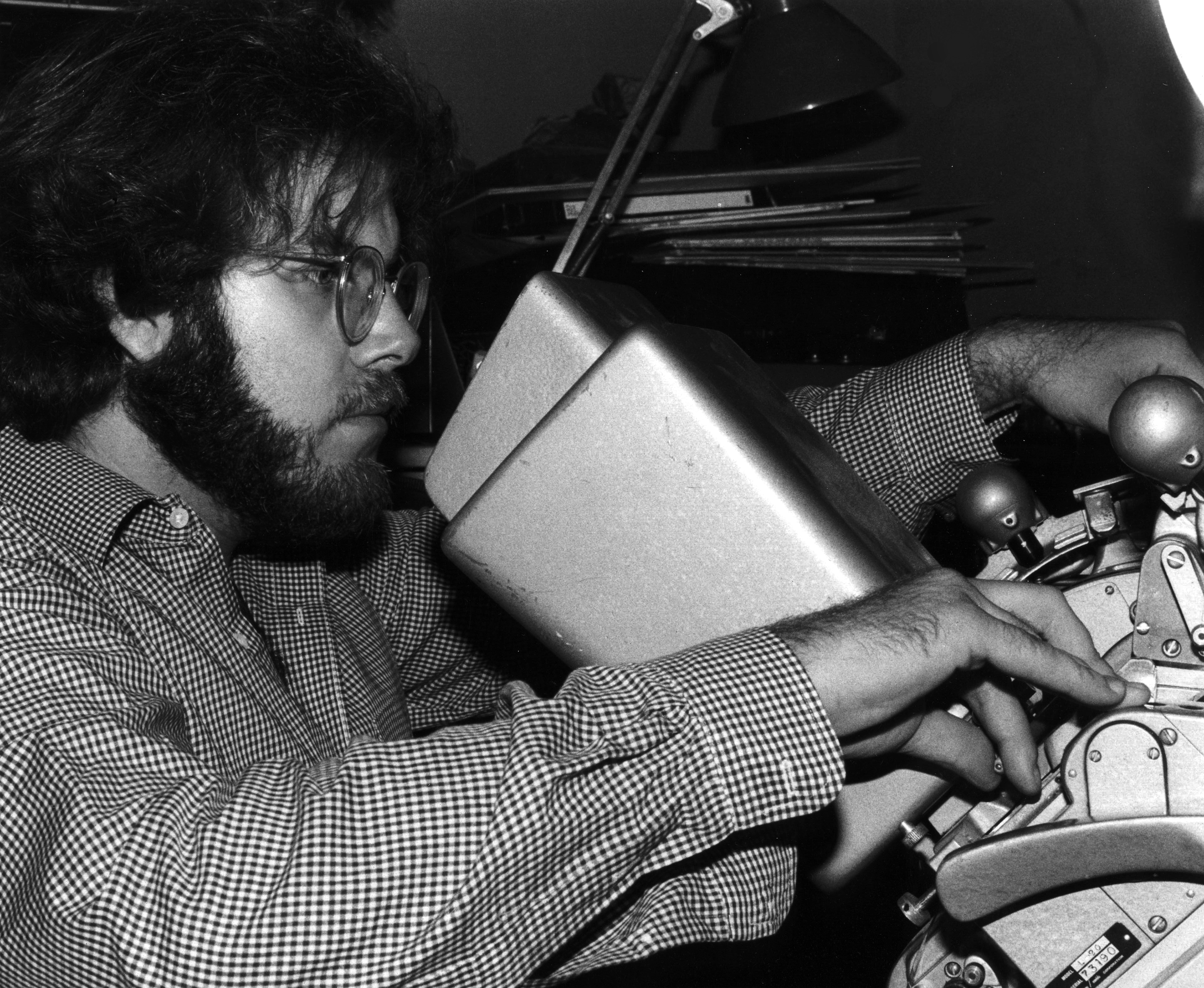
- Born: May 30, 1955 (age 71); St. Louis, Missouri, US
- Other name: Bradford Mays
- Occupations: Filmmaker; Writer
- Years active: 1970–present
- Spouse: Lorenda Starfelt (1995–2011)(her death)
- Partner: Suzanne Gould

Brad Mays (born May 30, 1955) is an independent filmmaker, author and stage director, currently living and working in New Jersey.

== Background and education ==
Mays grew up in the Edinburg section of West Windsor Township, New Jersey, attending the local public schools before going to Princeton High School. During the early 1970s, Mays became involved in the performing arts during a professional internship at the McCarter Theater in Princeton, New Jersey. When his family moved to Maryland in the wake of difficulties resulting from his participation in anti-war demonstrations, he became heavily involved in the Baltimore experimental theater scene and, at the age of eighteen, began directing at the Corner Theatre ETC. Among many plays he directed during that period were an evening of one-acts by Ionesco, The Boys In The Band by Mart Crowley, The Devils by John Whiting, Threepenny Opera by Weill/Brecht, and two plays by Peter Shaffer, Amadeus and Equus.

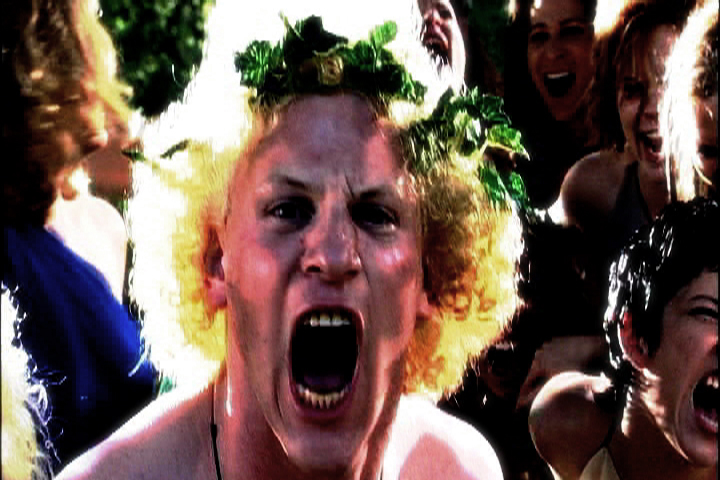
Richard Werner as Dionysus in Brad Mays' independent feature film production of Euripides' The Bacchae, 2000

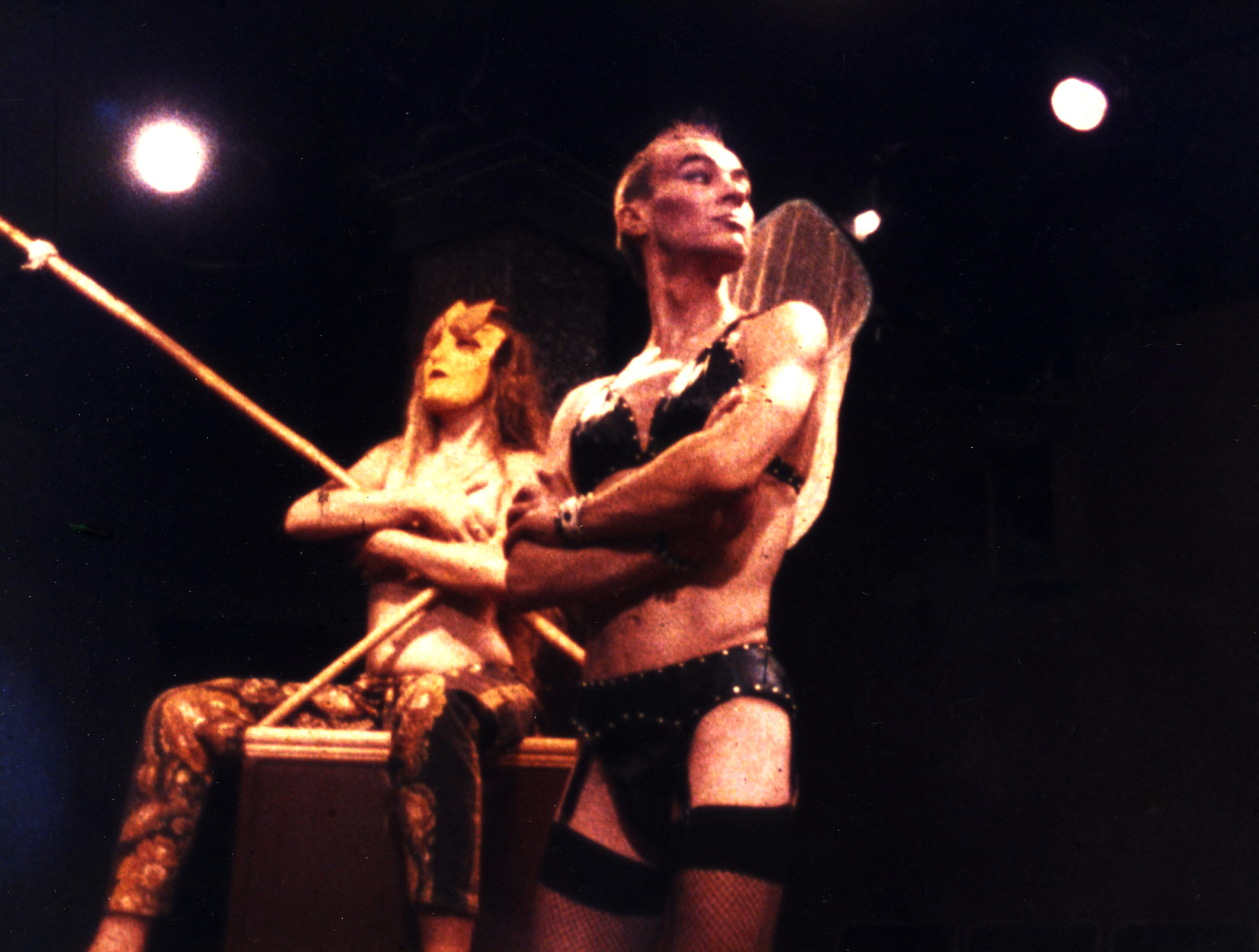
Sara (Nina Rutledge) and Zip (Willie Brookes) in Brad Mays' independent feature film production of Stage Fright, 1989

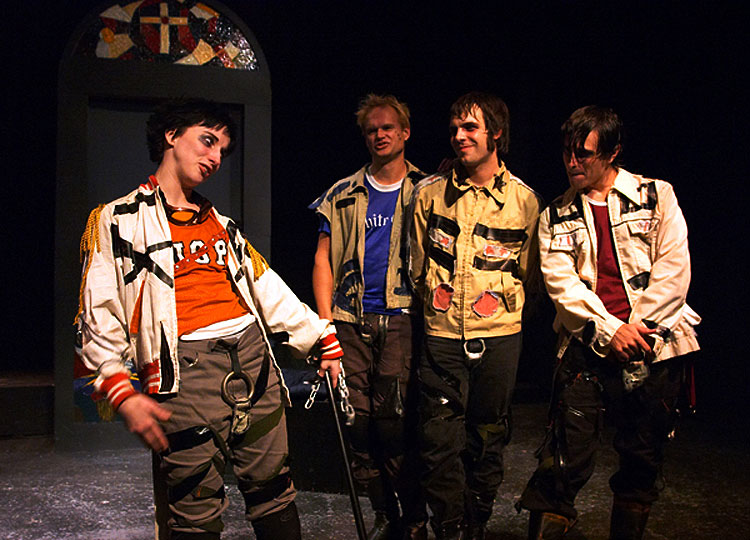
Vanessa Claire Smith, Sterling Wolfe, Michael Holmes, and Ricky Coates in Brad Mays' multi-media stage production of A Clockwork Orange, 2003, Los Angeles (photo: Peter Zuehlke)

After completing theatre arts studies at Towson University in Towson, Maryland, Mays was formally hired by the Baltimore Theatre Project. In 1982, he moved to New York City, where he began working off-Broadway and ultimately produced and directed his first independent feature film, Stage Fright.

== Film work ==
In 2006, Mays filmed the documentary feature SING*ularity (2008), which explores the training of classical singers at the OperaWorks program in Southern California. Other films include a (still unfinished) free-form adaptation of Euripides' The Bacchae (2002), and his first feature, Stage Fright, a semi-autobiographical piece, co-written with his friend and fellow Corner Theatre alum, Stanley Keyes, which depicts the trials and tribulations of a late '60's theatre company and had its inaugural screenings at the 1989 Berlin International Film Festival under the auspices of American Independents In Berlin and the New York Foundation for the Arts. It was during the editing of that particular project that Mays was invited to participate as a segment director on Howard Stern's first Pay-Per-View special, Howard Stern's Negligee and Underpants Party.

Mays' 2008 motion picture romantic comedy The Watermelon premiered at the San Diego Film Festival, where it quickly achieved the top slot for audience and industry buzz. Written by Michael Hemmingson, The Watermelon was produced by Lorenda Starfelt at LightSong Films in North Hollywood, and was conceived as a "Fairy Tale for grown-ups." The film stars Will Beinbrink, Kiersten Morgan, Elyse Ashton, Julia Aks, Mike Ivy and Bob Golub. The Watermelon was released by Celebrity Video Distribution, a Los Angeles distribution company dedicated to serving the independent film community. It was subsequently awarded a 2010 California Film Awards "Diamond Award."

In 2009, Brad Mays finished work on the feature-length political documentary The Audacity of Democracy, which followed the 2008 race for the Democratic Presidential Nomination and focused in particular on the notorious PUMA movement. In multiple Blog-Radio interviews, the director expressed dissatisfaction with the project, revealing that he had not been allowed to complete shooting in the manner originally agreed to. On June 6, 2011, Brad Mays discussed his personal and working relationship with his late wife Lorenda Starfelt – who had died of uterine cancer earlier that year – with blog radio host John Smart. In the interview, which Smart described on his website as "harsh, truthful and brutally honest," Mays revealed the closeness of his artistic collaboration with Starfelt, as well as his reasons for considering their 2010 documentary film co-production The Audacity of Democracy to have been "unsuccessful...incomplete, inconclusive, ultimately unsatisfying and even embarrassing." In June 2012, Mays' comedy short The Donut Shop received the "People's Choice Award" at the San Francisco Black Film Festival, as well as "Best Comedy" at the 2012 San Diego Black Film Festival.

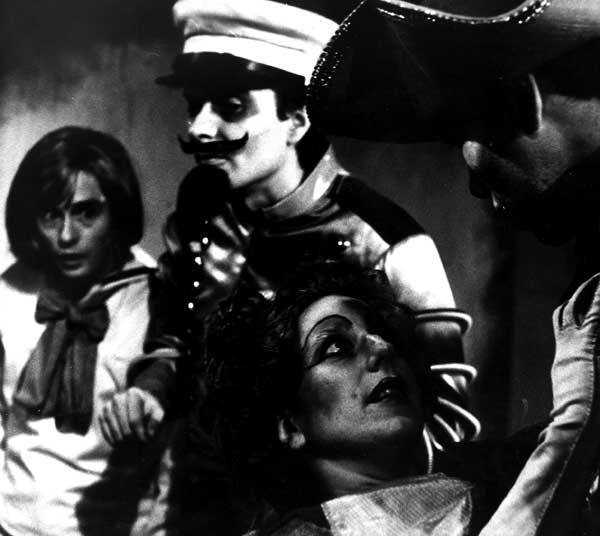
Tobias Haller, Stanley Keyes, Linda Chambers, and James Curran in Brad Mays' production of The Water Hen, by Stanislaw Ignacy Witkiewicz, 1983, New York

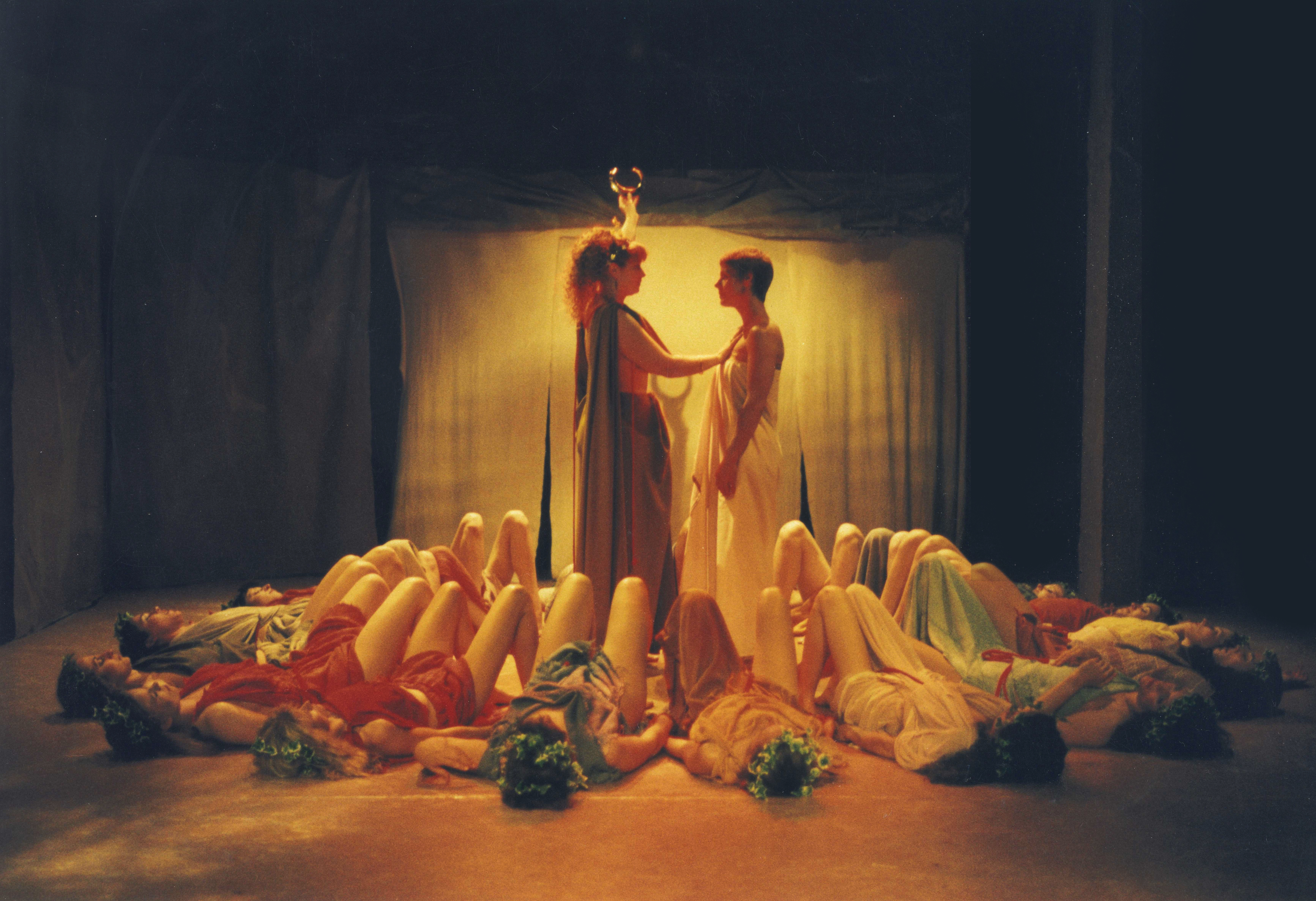
Ramona Reeves and Lynn Odell in Brad Mays' stage production of Euripides' The Bacchae, 1997, Los Angeles

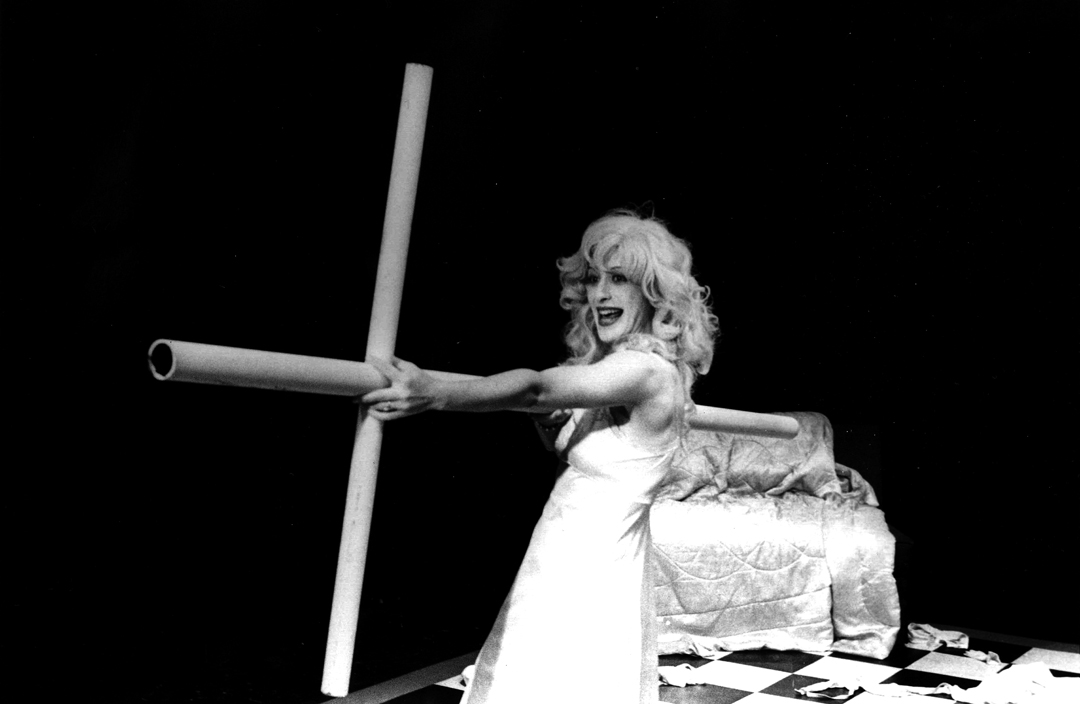
Robin Bittman in the play White Whore And The Bit Player directed by Brad Mays at Corner Theater in Baltimore, 1981.

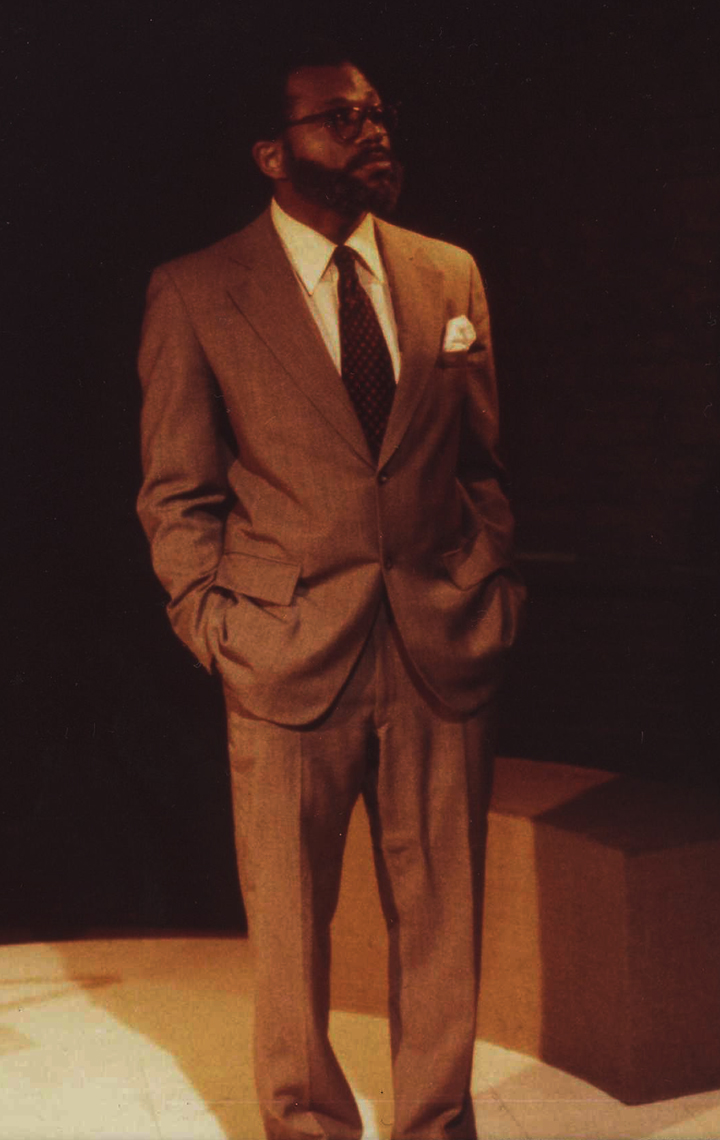
Charles S. Dutton as Dysart in Equus, as directed by Brad Mays in May 1979 in Baltimore

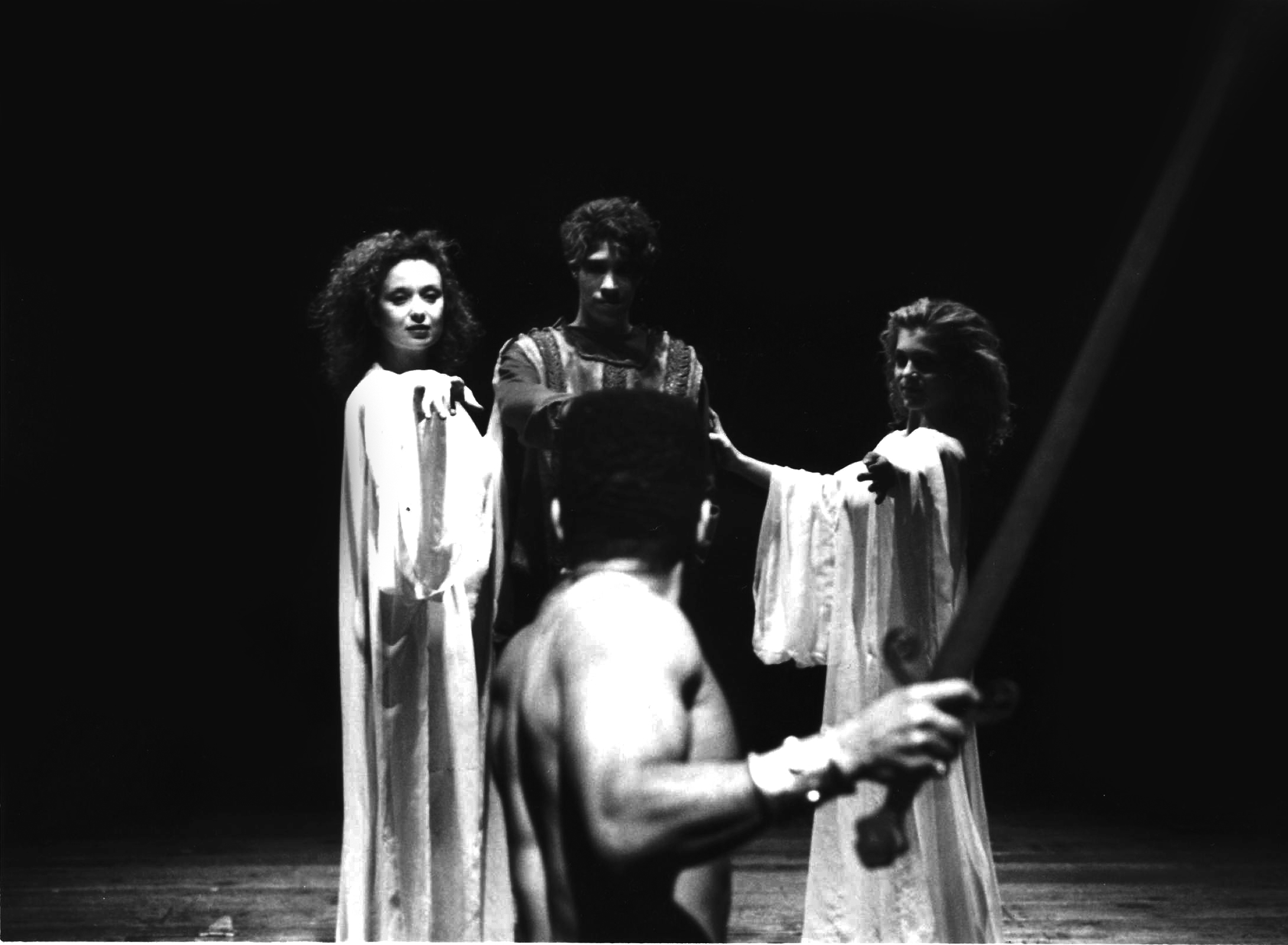
Rain Pryor as Joan of Arc, with Robin Skye, Zoe Trilling, and Tyrone Granderson Jones in Brad Mays' 2003 Los Angeles stage production of Joan, written by Linda Chambers

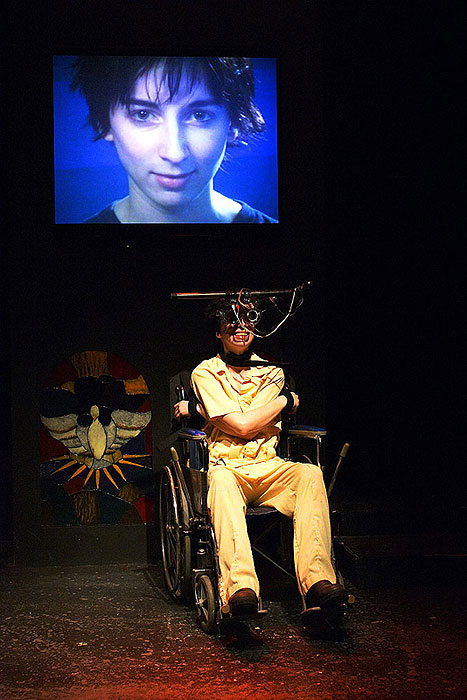
Vanessa Claire Smith in Brad Mays' multi-media stage production of A Clockwork Orange, produced in Los Angeles in 2003, by Lorenda Starfelt. (photo: Peter Zuehlke)

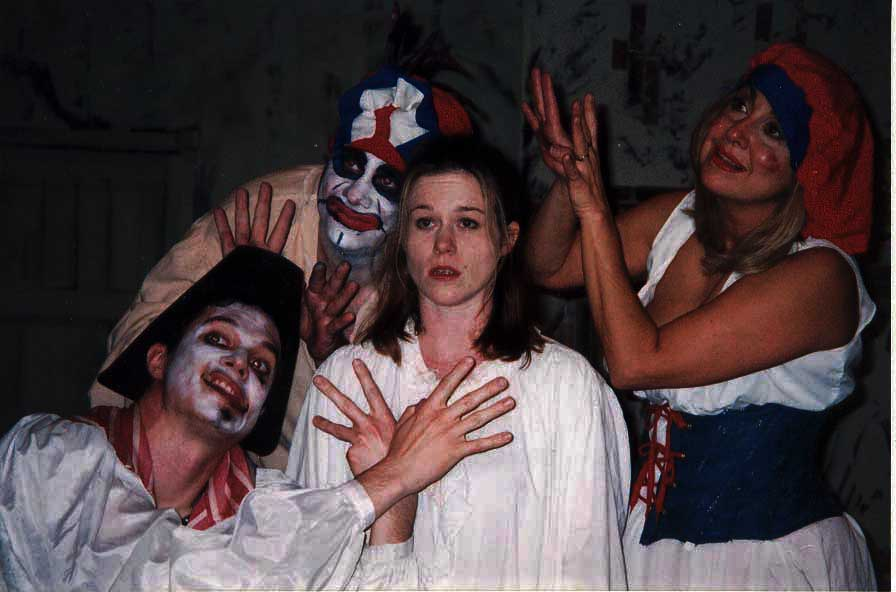
Trevor Murphy, Greg Wall, Leanne Fonteyn and Von Rae Wood in Brad Mays' production of Marat/Sade, Theatre of NOTE, 2000.

In 2013, Mays' feature documentary I Grew Up in Princeton had its premiere showing in Princeton, New Jersey. The film, described in one Princeton newspaper as a "deeply personal 'coming-of-age story' that yields perspective on the role of perception in a town that was split racially, economically and sociologically", is a portrayal of life in the venerable university town during the tumultuous period of the late sixties through the early seventies.< Featuring interviews with over 60 artists, political activists, educators, historians, musicians and others, the film deals with the town's past struggles with racism, political unrest and the still-controversial shutdown of the Institute for Defense Analysis (IDA) during the anti-Vietnam War student strike - both university and high school - in the days immediately following the Kent State shootings of 1970.

On March 17, 2016, Mays premiered the self-described "bleak little comedy about falling in hate," Road Rage, at The Garden theater in Princeton, New Jersey. Shot for the most part in and around Princeton, the film tells the story of Matt Lipton (Adam Roth), a widowed man in his early 60s who enters into a misbegotten romantic relationship with a pretentious would-be "townie" named Missy Taylor (Kristin Jann-Fischer). The two embark on a road trip into the deep South, with disastrous consequences. The film can be seen as an expression of Mays' continuing yearning for his beloved hometown, as well as for the loss of his wife, Lorenda, to cancer. “I was able to flesh out the deceased wife's character to a degree that would have been otherwise impossible,” Mays says in an article for the Princeton Packet. “For instance, Lori had always wanted to be an opera singer. I was able to fulfill that dream for her in the movie, and tie it in with the narrative in a way that I find very satisfying.” Ironically, the film's star Adam Roth also succumbed to cancer in the final stages of production, necessitating extensive rewrites and additional shooting. Roth, an extremely popular guitarist/composer in New York's hard rock scene, grew up in Princeton, and had worked extensively in that town's professional and community theater scene during the 1970s. ”Actually, when he was young, Adam did a lot of acting while his family lived in Princeton — at the high school and at McCarter Theater,” Mays said to journalist Sally Stang just before his film's premiere. “Even back then the word ‘genius’ was tossed around. Adam was something else... right up to the end.” In the days leading up to the film's premiere and New York screenings, Mays and partner/co-producer Barbara Curtis appeared on several radio and television shows, discussing the themes of Road Rage, as well as the challenges in getting it from script to the screen.

In March 2018, Brad Mays' 14 minute short film, "Aiden's Butterflies," had its premiere screening at the Princeton Environmental Film Festival, with a subsequent screening at the Paradigm Shifts Film and Music Festival in Manhattan, New York. "Aiden's Butterflies" is a short film about a young New Jersey boy, Aiden Wang, who has developed a deep love and understanding of Monarch Butterflies, an endangered species. The film was produced by Olga Taylan for the Environmental Education Fund, and features Yuki Azumi, Frances Catherine Ihlng, Adrian Hyde, and Trina Paulus. "Aiden's Butterflies" has since become a staple of environmental film festivals around the world.

In 2019, Brad Mays completed work on Two Trentons: An American City Speaks. As the title suggests, the documentary feature is a portrait of a city "at war with itself," as the director said in an August, 2019 interview with New Jersey Stage. It premiered on September 15, 2019 at the New Jersey International Film Festival. Two Trentons presents a broad view of the city, and includes interviews with artists, musicians, activists, city planners, mental health professionals, architects, and non profit workers. There is also footage of the notorious "Art All Night" gang shooting, as well as its aftermath. According to IMdB: "Two Trentons" is a hard-hitting look at a city desperate to redefine itself - through art, music, education, and prison reform - from its all-too-familiar image as a blighted, urban lost cause of decay, violence, hopelessness and moral decline. Featuring numerous interviews with city planners, clergymen, scientists, mental health professionals, artists, musicians, educators, and non-profit volunteers, the experiences of the people who live, work and struggle in Trenton are movingly expressed with eloquence and urgency." The film won the "Best Documentary - Honorable Mention Award" at the festival, and was invited to be featured in other film festivals including the "Garden State Film Festival" and the "New York City Indie Film Festival". Another feature documentary, Jubilate Trego: The Choral Legacy of William Trego, was accepted as an official selection by the 7th Music Film Festival in Buenos Aires, Argentina in November 2022.

In 2020, Mays directed the experimental music video Leviathan, for Detroit producer Blake Harrington, and worked as cinematographer for the educational film The Rags of Time: J. Robert Oppenheimer for director Patricia Robinson-Linder. More recently, Mays spent 18 months working on 3 Degrees of Connection, a feature documentary film which explores the environmental, racial, and other social challenges of Lewes, Delaware. An early newspaper article about the film described it as "a cautionary tale vividly told through the eyes of the town's residents and business owners, educators and elected officials, both old-timers and newcomers. All explore some aspect of the town's past, present and future." Over a year after its premiere screening in Lewes, the film was still being widely discussed, both in gatherings and in print.

On September 16, 2022, the Global Nonviolent Film Festival announced the inclusion of both Two Trentons: An American City Speaks and 3 Degrees of Connection as official selections in their 11th annual film competition. On the day of its screening, festival co-founder Bruno Pischiutta, in his televised introduction, referred to Brad Mays as "the best documentary director in the United States". The festival's jury ultimately awarded Mays with "Best Director of a Feature Documentary" for Two Trentons - An American City Speaks. Global Cinema has also selected the film for world-wide distribution. The Seaside Sustainability Film Festival of Gloucester, Massachusetts also featured 3 Degrees of Connection as an Official Selection in their first annual presentation. On May 21 of 2024, "Two Trentons: An American City Speaks" was given a "Telly Award," at their 45th annual event, for "pushing the boundaries of our creativity Beyond the Frame."

== Stage work ==
Brad Mays has primarily directed for the stage in Baltimore, New York City, and Los Angeles. His first New York production was an evening of one-act plays, written by Linda Chambers and performed at the Cubiculo Theatre: Joan, Stones, and Requiem. All three pieces deal with themes of personal spirituality. Requiem, the longest play of the evening, was a fictionalized drama about the death of Irish hunger striker Bobby Sands, and performed during the Saint Patrick's Day. In 1982, Mays' Off-Broadway presentation of Stanisław Ignacy Witkiewicz's The Water Hen, was cited for its inventive set, costume, and lighting designs, as well as for what critic Mark Matousek referred to as Mays' "masterful comic direction". The production, presented at Theater Off-Park under the auspices of Patricia Flynn Peat, was videotaped by the Lincoln Center's Billy Rose Theatre Collection for inclusion in their permanent archive.

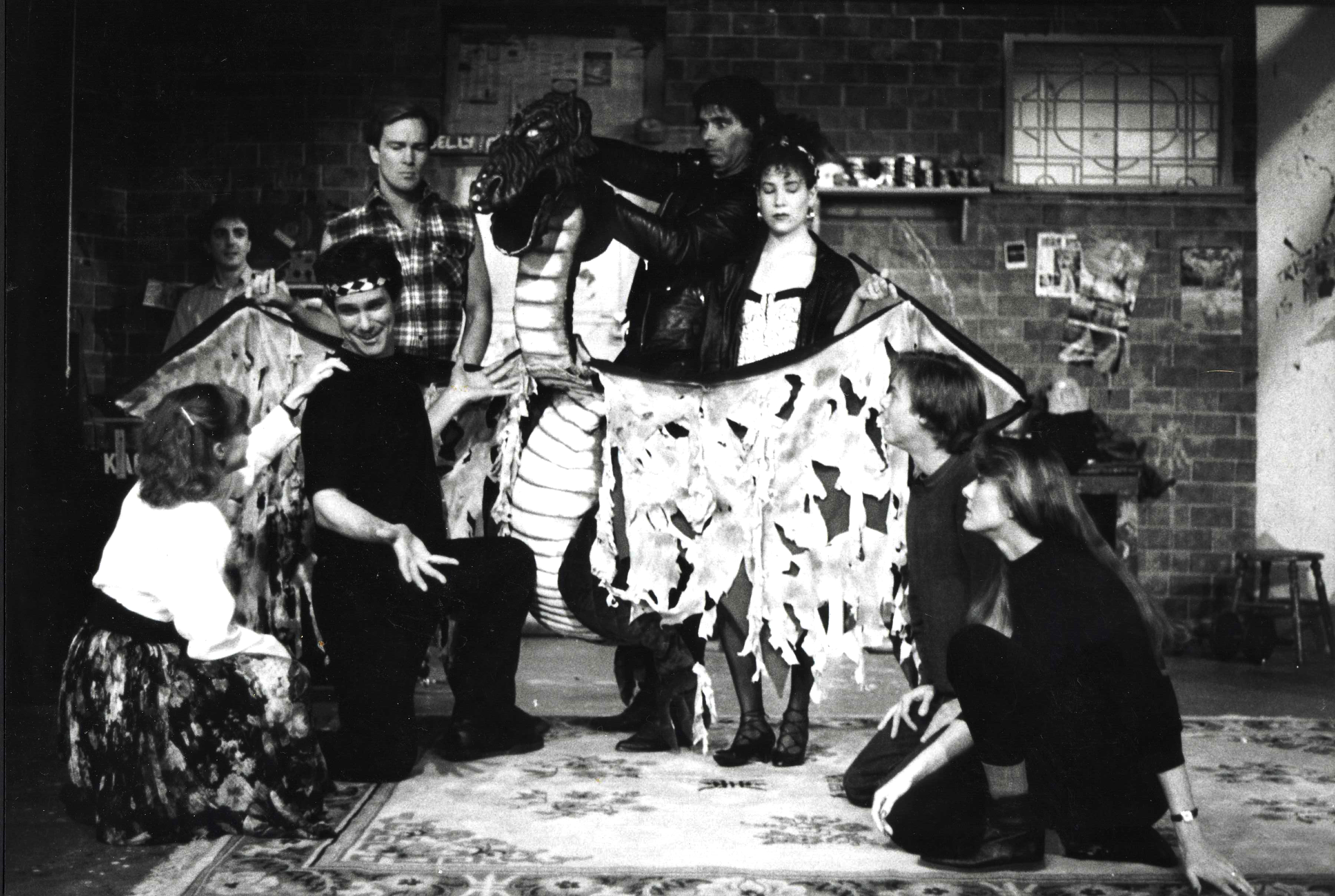
Scene from Keyes' play Dragon Slayers, directed by Brad Mays, Los Angeles, 1990.

Will Beinbrink and Kiersten Morgan in a scene from "The Watermelon" directed by Brad Mays (2008)

Kristin Jann-Fischer and Adam Roth in a scene from "Road Rage," directed by Brad Mays (2016)

In Los Angeles, Mays' original adaptation of Euripides' The Bacchae was nominated for three LA Weekly Theatre Awards (including Best Direction) in 1997 and also videotaped for the Lincoln Center's archive. The production was recognized for its overall directorial audacity, the movement-scoring work by choreographer Kim Weild, and for its aggressive onstage violence and nudity. Mays' multi-media production of Anthony Burgess' A Clockwork Orange, performed in Los Angeles at the ARK Theatre company, was likewise nominated for Best Direction, Best Revival Production, and Best Actress by the 2004 LA Weekly Theater Awards. Vanessa Claire Smith won Best Actress for her gender-bending portrayal of Alex, the story's protagonist. In 2021, Mays' production was included in the Anthony Burgess estate's official online overview of stage productions of "A Clockwork Orange" from around the world.

Other work of his includes Peter Weiss' The Persecution and Assassination of Jean-Paul Marat as Performed by the Inmates of the Asylum of Charenton Under the Direction of the Marquis de Sade at Theatre of NOTE in Los Angeles; an expanded version of Joan by Linda Chambers, starring Rain Pryor as Joan of Arc; and the black comedy Dragon Slayers, by Stanley Keyes, in which a cult of insane puppeteers engage in ritual murder. Dragon Slayers was performed in both New York and Los Angeles over a period of several years, featuring an original electronic score contributed by Garth Hudson of the late sixties rock group The Band.

In 2022, Brad Mays returned to the theater following an 18-year hiatus when he agreed to direct the New York premiere of I Babysat Jesus, a one-woman show written by and starring Mary Elizabeth Barrett.

== Other work ==
Brad Mays was invited to discuss Euripides' The Bacchae for WGBH Boston's 2010 PBS series Invitation to World Literature, which was also launched on Annenberg Media's educational website in September, 2010. Also featured on the show were Nobel Prize winner Wole Soyinka, director Richard Schechner, and actor Alan Cumming.

In November 0f 2026, Mays published his first novel, The Case Of The Whitechapel Doppelganger, which the publisher describes as "Sherlock Holmes is persuaded to assist Scotland Yard in their pursuit of Jack the Ripper, following the killer across the Atlantic all the way to America, and beyond. In the process, Holmes discovers the two have much in common."

== Selected filmography ==
Year	Film	Function	Notes
1989	Stage Fright	Director/Editor/ Co-Screenwriter	Premiered at the 1989 Berlin International Film Festival; sponsored in Berlin by the New York Foundation For The Arts, and the Goethe House in Manhattan, New York
2002	The Bacchae	Director/Editor/ Screenwriter	Screen adaptation of Euripides' classic play, filmed roughly two years after Mays' acclaimed Los Angeles stage production
2004	Paper Chasers	Editor	Re-edit of hip-hop feature documentary produced and directed by Maxie Collier, and featuring James Brown, Chuck D., Flavor Flav, Master P., Ludacris, and Russell Simmons
2004	Shakespeare's Merchant	Producer/Editor	Adaptation of Shakespeare's The Merchant of Venice, adapted and directed by Los Angeles stage director Paul Wagar; and produced by Mays' wife Lorenda Starfelt
2004	The Trojan Women	Director/Editor	Documentary film of Brad Mays' 2003 Los Angeles stage production of Euripides' classic tragedy, produced by the ARK Theatre Company
2005	Resilience	Editor	Acclaimed feature drama, written, produced, and directed by Paul Bojack
2005	Sunset Stripper Murders	Editor	A complete re-edit of the erotic thriller Seventh Veil, directed by Amin Q. Chaudhri
2006	Dodo: The Documentary	Co-Producer/Editor	Documentary-comedy about the life and times of comedian Bob Golub, directed by Golub and released in 2010
2008	SING*ularity	Director/Co-Producer/ Editor	Documentary about the world-famous OperaWorks training program for classical vocalists, filmed in the years 2006–2007
2008	The Watermelon	Director/Editor	Oddball romantic comedy, written by Michael Hemmingson; world premiere at the 2008 San Diego Film Festival and released July 7, 2009; received the California Film Awards 2010 Diamond Award
2008	The Audacity of Democracy	Director/Editor	Documentary of the 2008 Democratic Presidential Primary, shot in Dallas; Princeton, New Jersey; Washington, D.C., and Denver; Released in 2009
2009	Crystal Fog	Editor	Documentary drama written, produced and directed by Sundance Festival award winner Steve Yeager
2009	The Dream of Alvareen	Editor	Fantasy-drama, written, produced and directed by Alex Lehr
2009	ShowGirls, Provincetown, MA	Editor	Documentary film about the venerable weekly "Showgirls" crossing-dressing variety show in Provincetown, Massachusetts where drag queens compete for a cash prize; premiered at the 2009 Palm Springs International Film Festival in Palm Springs, California
2010	A Way Back In	Director/Co-Producer/ Editor	Dramatic action film short; world premiere at the 2010 Idyllwild International Festival of Cinema in Idyllwild, California; winner of three Indie Fest Awards (Short Film, Leading Actor, Direction), and three Accolade Awards Of Merit (Short Film, Creativity/Originality, Direction)
2011	Customer Diss-Service	Director, Editor	Web series produced by Ron Williams, Scott Weisenfeld, and Starfelt; starring Frank Noon and Johnny D'Agostino
2012	The Donut Shop	Director, Editor	Comedy short produced and written by Theo Ogunyode, and starring Ogunyode, Saria Daniels, Valerie Ludwig, Gregory Thompson, Dwight Williams, Romel Jamison, and Cesili Williams; recipient of the "People's Choice Award" at the 2012 San Francisco Black Film Festival, and "Best Comedy" at the 2012 San Diego Black Film Festival
2013	I Grew Up in Princeton	Director, Editor	Feature documentary produced by Lorenda Starfelt
2015	Road Rage	Producer, Director, Writer, Editor.	Feature "Bleak little comedy about falling in hate," starring Adam Roth, Kristin Jann-Fischer, Susan Tenney, Tony Stacey, Janise Whelan, Marty Krzywonos, and Erika Person
2018	Jubilate Trego: The Choral Legacy of William Trego	Producer, Director, Writer, Editor.	Feature documentary film about the life and career of William Trego, choir director of Princeton High School in New Jersey and one of the most respected choral conductors of the 20th century; an "Official Selection" at the 7th Music Film Festival in Buenos Aires, Argentina in 2022
2019	Aiden's Butterflies	Producer, Director, Writer, Editor.	Short film meditation about Aiden Wang, a young Princeton boy who is doing his part to prevent the extinction of monarch butterflies; With Yuki Azumi, Frances Catherine Ihlng, Adrian Hyde, Trina Paulus, Jim Waltman
2019	Two Trentons: An American City Speaks	Director, Editor, Cinematographer.	Feature film portrait of a city at war with itself; starring Ed (NJ Weedman) Forchion, Angelo Onofri, E.C. Bradley, Mindy Fullilove, Jeff Stewart, Jacque Howard; produced by Joe Hulihan; recipient of the "Best Documentary - Honorable Mention Award" at the 2019 New Jersey International Film Festival; recipient of the "Best Director of a Feature Documentary Award" at the 2022 Global Nonviolent Film Festival
2020	Rags Of Time: J. Robert Oppenheimer	Cinematographer, Editor.	Educational film portrayal of Robert Oppenheimer, as he reflects on his life; directed by Patricia Robinson-Linder
2022	3 Degrees of Connection	Producer, Director, Cinematographer, Editor.	Feature documentary explores the development of Lewes, Delaware from a working class fishing community to an increasingly exclusive seaside retirement destination; Debates about race and climate change dominate the portrayal of the "First Town in the First State" of America; co-producer: Richard Moore
