= Lorenda Starfelt =

American film producer

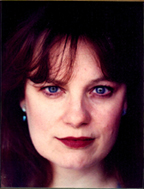
- Lorenda Starfelt
- Born: January 11, 1955; Belleville, Illinois, U.S.
- Died: March 16, 2011 (aged 56); Los Angeles, California, U.S.
- Spouse: Brad Mays (1995–2011)
- Parent: Phyllis Smith
- Website: Lorenda Starfelt's Official Website

Lorenda Starfelt (January 11, 1955 – March 16, 2011) was an independent film producer, as well as a committed political activist and blogger who notably dug up president Barack Obama's birth announcement in an August 1961 edition of The Honolulu Advertiser while researching her documentary on the 2008 presidential election, The Audacity of Democracy.

== Background ==
Lorenda Starfelt was born on January 11, 1955, in Belleville, Illinois. According to her website biography, she and her brother Brad Peters were raised by their mother, Phyllis Smith. During her high school years, a brief attempt was made to remove Starfelt from her mother’s care. While attending Belleville High School, Starfelt developed an interest in the theater, but circumstances prevented her from pursuing that passion until much later in life. Several years after graduation, Lorenda met and married an engineer named William Starfelt. The short-lived marriage produced a son, Graham, who remained under his mother’s care after his parents’ eventual divorce. Following a brief stay in Florida, Starfelt moved to San Francisco, where she quickly became involved in the political work of left-wing activist Tom Hayden. Starfelt and her son eventually settled in Los Angeles, where she began work as an interior designer, while maintaining an interest in politics.

== Career ==
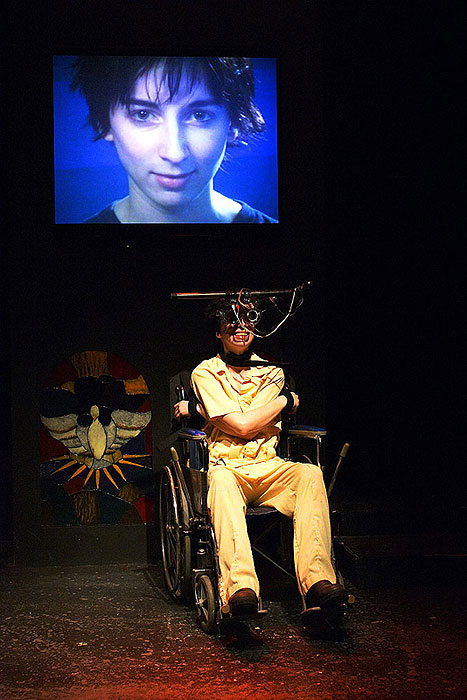
Vanessa Claire Smith in Brad Mays' multi-media stage production of A Clockwork Orange, produced in Los Angeles in 2003, by Lorenda Starfelt. (photo: Peter Zuehlke)

Lorenda (Lori) Starfelt was the producer of the independent feature film comedy The Watermelon, which premiered at the 2008 San Diego Film Festival. Directed by Brad Mays, The Watermelon was written by Michael Hemmingson and stars Will Beinbrink, Kiersten Morgan, Elyse Ashton, Julia Aks, Steven Shields and Mike Ivy.

In 2000, Ms. Starfelt produced, in conjunction with Turman-Morrissey Productions, an independent feature film adaptation of Euripides' The Bacchae. Her next project was an adaptation of William Shakespeare's The Merchant of Venice, entitled Shakespeare's Merchant, directed by Paul Wagar. She followed up that particular project with Schooled, a drama written & directed by Brooks Elms, which portrays the unique difficulties facing both students and teachers engaged in alternative education. Ms. Starfelt's next film project was the documentary feature SING*ularity (2008), which examines the cutting-edge training of student and professional-level vocalists at Ann Baltz's world-renowned OperaWorks program in Northridge, California.

In 2009, Starfelt's feature-length political documentary film The Audacity of Democracy was released. The film offered an inside view of the 2008 race for the Democratic Presidential Nomination, focusing in particular on the notorious PUMA movement. In multiple Blog-Radio interviews, Lorenda Starfelt spoke candidly about her commitment to Hillary Clinton's presidential run, and the misogyny she personally encountered in various liberal political circles.

In addition to her film work, Ms. Starfelt also produced for the Los Angeles stage, most notably The Bacchae in 1997 at the Complex, Marat/Sade in 2000 for the Theatre of N.O.T.E. and a multi-media production of Anthony Burgess' A Clockwork Orange which was nominated for Best Direction, Best Revival Production, and Best Actress by the 2004 LA Weekly Theater Awards. Vanessa Claire Smith won Best Actress for her gender-bending portrayal of Alex, the story's music-loving teenaged sociopath. In a 2011 web radio interview with Priscilla Leona, Ms. Starfelt discussed a new comedy web series, Customer Diss-Service, that she and her husband Brad Mays were currently engaged in. Stressing the need for strong scripts and experienced, well-trained actors, she asserted that working within small budgets enables creative freedom, thus affording experienced artists a change to present their work in a completely unfettered form. Starfelt also discussed a number of new projects in the works, including the musical feature film Beginning Blue, which she co-wrote. Starfelt died on March 16, 2011, after battling cancer. In 2013, the feature documentary I Grew Up in Princeton, which Starfelt had undertaken with her husband Brad Mays before her death, had its inaugural screening in Princeton, New Jersey. The film, described in one Princeton newspaper as a "deeply personal 'coming-of-age story' that yields perspective on the role of perception in a town that was split racially, economically and sociologically", is a portrayal of life in the venerable university town during the tumultuous period of the late sixties through the early seventies.

== Filmography ==
Year	Film	Function	Notes
2002	The Bacchae	Producer	Screen adaptation of Euripides' classic play, filmed roughly two years after Mays' acclaimed Los Angeles stage production.
2004	Shakespeare's Merchant	Producer	Adaptation of Shakespeare's The Merchant of Venice, adapted and directed by Los Angeles stage director Paul Wagar.
2004	The Trojan Women	Producer/Actress	Documentary Film of Brad Mays' 2003 Los Angeles stage production of Euripides' classic tragedy, produced by the ARK Theatre Company.
2007	Schooled	Co-Producer	
2008	SING*ularity	Producer	Documentary about the world-famous OperaWorks training program for classical vocalists, filmed in the years 2006 - 2007.
2008	The Watermelon	Producer	Oddball romantic comedy, written by Michael Hemmingson. World premiere at the 2008 San Diego Film Festival. Released July 7, 2009. Received the California Film Awards 2010 Diamond Award.
2008	The Audacity of Democracy	Producer	Documentary Film of the 2008 Democratic Presidential Primary, shot in Dallas, Princeton, Washington, D.C., and Denver. Released in 2009.
2011	Customer Diss-Service	Co-Producer	Web Series directed by Brad Mays and starring Frank Noon and Johnny D'Agostino.
2012	Beginning Blue	Producer, writer	Feature film about an all-girl rock band determined not to trade on looks or gender appeal.
2012	The Donut Shop	Co-Producer	Comedy short directed by Brad Mays, and produced and written and starring Theo Ogunyode. Recipient of the "People's Choice Award" at the 2012 San Francisco Black Film Festival.
2013	I Grew Up in Princeton	Producer	Feature documentary directed by Brad Mays.
