= Linda Chambers =

Linda Chambers may refer to:

- Linda Chambers (playwright), screenwriter
- Linda Chambers-Young, voice actress
- birth name of Linda Sharrock (b. 1947), American jazz singer
