= The Audacity of Democracy =

- Directed by: Brad Mays
- Written by: Brad Mays
- Produced by: Brad Mays; Lorenda Starfelt; Steve Yeager
- Starring: Darragh Murphy; Kim Haas; Tommy Christopher
- Cinematography: Brad Mays; Steve Yeager; Lorenda Starfelt
- Edited by: Brad Mays
- Music by: Gus Mays
- Release date: January 23, 2009
- Running time: 118 minutes
- Country: United States
- Language: English

The Audacity of Democracy is a 2009 American independent documentary film produced by Lorenda Starfelt and directed by Brad Mays for LightSong Films in North Hollywood. The film, which was shot in New York City, Washington, D.C.; Chicago, Illinois; Dallas and Austin, Texas; and Denver, Colorado is an in-depth look at the P.U.M.A. (People United Means Action) movement in general and one of its most controversial leaders, Darragh Murphy, in particular.

== Criticism ==
Brad Mays quickly came under fire from various online pro-Obama blogs, citing conflict-of-interest due to the production having been financed by PUMA-Pac itself. A vociferously anti-PUMA site called StupidPumas posted a paged entitled Stupid Brad Mays, criticizing the filmmaker for not doing proper investigative work on the PUMA movement. Mays acknowledged these concerns, while maintaining that the film would be an objective account of what he saw and heard during the Democratic primary. About a week before the Democratic convention in Denver, all of Mays' camera equipment was stolen while en route to Chicago. Although most of the gear was eventually replaced, the crucial Chicago shoot was seriously compromised.

When Mays decided, for the sake of balance, to film interviews with internet journalist Tommy Christopher, an outspoken critic of the PUMA movement, the rank and file of the PUMA movement quickly denounced the filmmaker, distancing themselves from the entire project. In multiple subsequent Blog-Radio interviews, Brad Mays has expressed extreme dissatisfaction with his film, revealing that he had not been allowed to complete shooting in the manner originally agreed to, adding that many of the PUMA members who had decided to switch their support to John McCain did not care for the way their new-found Republican leanings played onscreen. According to a WordPress.com announcement for the movie, "this two hour film offers a sympathetic yet unflinching look at a genuine grass-roots political action group determined, for good or ill, to change the course of American history."

Citing alleged electoral malfeasance including caucus fraud on the part of rival candidate Barack Obama's juggernaut campaign, PUMA attempted, without success, to secure the Democratic Party's presidential nomination for their candidate of choice, Senator and former First Lady Hillary Clinton.
