= People United Means Action =

United States political action committee

PUMA PAC
- Founded: June 4, 2008
- Defunct: May 11, 2011
- Executive Director: Darragh Murphy
- Website: Pumapac.org

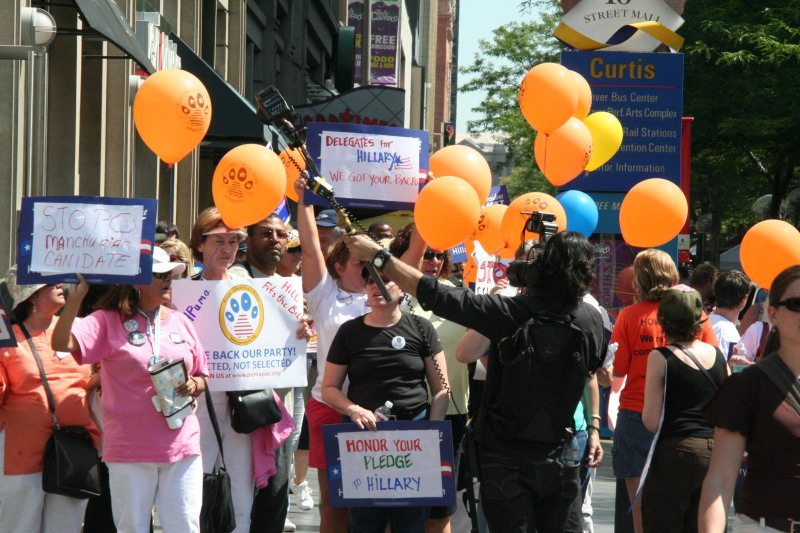
P.U.M.A. protest at the 2008 Democratic National Convention

"People United Means Action" (PUMA) was a political action committee in the United States that opposed the Democratic Party leadership and the nomination of Senator Barack Obama as the Democratic candidate for president in the 2008 presidential election. PUMA began as an effort by supporters of Obama's primary rival, Senator Hillary Rodham Clinton, who believed that Clinton should have been the Democratic nominee. According to PUMA, "We [were] protesting the 2008 Presidential election because we refuse to support a nominee who was selected by the leadership rather than elected by the voters." The organization was founded and led by Darragh Murphy.

On May 11, 2011, the PUMA PAC was stripped of its status as a recognized political action committee for failure to meet reporting requirements.

== Organization ==
=== Origin ===
The PUMA PAC registered as a non-affiliated political action committee (PAC) with the Federal Election Commission and organized as a 527 Organization with the Internal Revenue Service in June 2008. Darragh Murphy filed the paperwork with the Federal Election Commission to start the organization on June 3, the day before Obama became the Democratic Party's presumptive nominee. PUMA's founders state that the group originated out of online comments of a group of Clinton supporters on a pro-Clinton blog, The Confluence, which was created by New Jersey biochemist and former John Edwards supporter "Riverdaughter," who had been recently banned from a pro-Obama liberal blog. The website ClintonsForMcCain.com was registered by the Republican National Committee on May 15, 2008, well in advance of Clinton's concession speech.

PUMA was also part of a coalition of online activists with similar goals, the JustSayNoDeal coalition. The PUMA acronym as originally coined stood for "Party Unity My Ass", but the PAC was registered as "People United Means Action," a backronym. Executive director Darragh Murphy estimated that PUMA PAC proper had gathered over 10,000 members and that the organization's official site had received more than a million hits between its founding in June through August 2008. Dianne Mantouvalos, founder of the larger JustSayNoDeal coalition, estimates the coalition comprises over 100 groups, and accounted for more than 10% of the 18,000,000 votes Clinton received in the primaries.

Will Bower, a media spokesperson for PUMA and JustSayNoDeal, summarized many of PUMA's objections to the actions of the Democratic Party during the 2008 presidential primaries. PUMA's stated beliefs were that the Democratic Party leadership chose Obama undemocratically despite the desires of Democratic voters, and that Obama was unfairly advantaged by the ruling by the Rules and Bylaws Committee on seating Florida and Michigan delegates.

PUMA members pointed to charges that the media directed sexism and misogyny at Clinton during the primary campaign and expressed anger at Democratic Party leaders' failure to speak against it or otherwise respond appropriately. After the primaries, while focusing none of his comments on Obama, Democratic National Committee chair Howard Dean did criticize the media, saying, "The media took a very sexist approach to Senator Clinton's campaign" in response to hearing objections from what he described as a "cross-section of women, from individual voters to powerful politicians and chief executives."

Some media and online commentators used the term PUMA to describe any Clinton primary voter who did not support Obama's nomination or the Democratic Party leadership, regardless of PAC affiliation.

=== Political action ===
PUMA's protest actions during the 2008 election took several forms, including encouraging a Clinton write-in campaign for the general election, voting for no presidential candidate, and supporting other candidates such as Obama's Republican opponent, Senator John McCain. Some hoped that enough superdelegates would change their minds to give Clinton the nomination at the upcoming Democratic National Convention that August. Other expressed desires were to help defeat Obama in the general election by electing McCain president to set up another run for Clinton in 2012, or that Clinton run as an independent candidate in the election. Some have noted that the Internet fostered the organization. Many PUMA advocates are part of the blogosphere and use it for organization, advocacy and viral communication.

PUMA advocated for an open convention in which Clinton's name would be placed in nomination and her delegates allowed to vote for her. The allied organization The Denver Group spearheaded an ad-based media campaign advocating for an open nomination convention including placing Clinton's name in nomination, allowing speeches in support and a roll-call vote. The campaign emphasized a connection between historical events and the 2008 convention, calling on DNC Chairman Howard Dean and Speaker of the House Nancy Pelosi to "follow fair and honest application of the democratic process and according to democratic principles" and resist turning "the convention into a coronation."

PAC members were among the groups protesting the 2008 Democratic National Convention.

== Organizers, co-founders and associated movements ==
Darragh Murphy, executive director of PUMA PAC, created the organization in June 2008, saying that her website's immediate goal was "to let the party know, let the leadership know that millions and millions of us are not going to support Obama, that we believe the nomination process was flawed beyond belief, that it was unfair and biased." According to one reporter who interviewed her, "Murphy ... believes that the only way to save the Democratic Party at this point was to destroy it. Mr. Obama must lose, and his supporters must be purged." But Murphy had characterized PUMA PAC's goals as "not an organized effort to leave the Democratic Party, but to get it back, to bring real unity to the party. Millions of voters are still very unhappy. We're going to still be here on November 5."

Diane Mantouvalos, who also founded HireHeels.com, a website trying to involve women in politics, founded "Just Say No Deal.com" along with Peter Boykin (creator of the slogan for the domain name), Will Bower, Cristi Adkins, Amy Goldman, Anne Franklin, Robin Carlson, and Thuc Ngyuen after Hillary Clinton announced the suspension of her campaign. Just Say No Deal was a coalition of groups, including PUMA, advocating against Obama as the nominee.

Clinton supporters including Christi Adkins, Anne Franklin, and Peter Boykin created Clintons4McCain.com. Clintons4McCain's group membership intended to vote for McCain in November 2008, and believed that he would be a tolerable president. Adkins and Franklin were interviewed on Third Rail Radio and Fox News on multiple occasions about PUMA's mission. Adkins and Bowers and other PUMAs appeared on The Daily Show with Jon Stewart during the convention.

== Criticism ==
PUMA has been criticized for its support of Republican candidates John McCain and Sarah Palin, especially considering the sharp policy differences between the Republican ticket and Hillary Clinton; this left the organization open to charges that it supported the McCain campaign solely out of spite or racism, with no concern for whether a McCain victory would actually advance Clinton's policy agenda.

Some Democrats argued that the organization's goals contradicted Clinton's stated views, and PUMA's lack of support from Clinton herself undermined its credibility. On CNN's Situation Room, Clinton said, "I'm going to do everything I can to make sure that anyone who supported me ... understands what a grave error it would be not to vote for Senator Obama." PUMA suggested that Clinton was not sincere in endorsing Obama, but was simply trying to avoid damage to her position in the party. One Democratic state committeewoman who said she supported Clinton, and whose attitude was "Enough with this PUMA stuff," said: "It's not like it's 'Rah rah Obama'. No. But he was our candidate...."

Patti Higgins, the chair of the Alaska Democratic Party, wrote to a PUMA supporter: "Having Senator Clinton's name on a roll call without having the votes would just embarrass her, waste time, and make people agonize over nothing. I find it difficult to believe that this organization was not an undercover McCain operation." On August 14, 2008, Clinton and Obama issued a joint news release stating that Clinton's name would be put into nomination and a roll-call vote held at the convention, in response to calls from Clinton supporters. Clinton previously stated at a fundraiser: "[I] believe that we will come out stronger if people feel that their voices were heard and their views were respected. I think that was a very big part of how we actually come out unified."

Amanda Marcotte had accused PUMA of being a front for McCain advocacy, pointing to Darragh Murphy's financial support of McCain in February 2000. Murphy acknowledged having donated to McCain, stating that the donation was to help him defeat George W. Bush in the primary. She said she voted for Democratic nominee Al Gore in the general election, although she did not donate to his campaign, and said she was "devastated when Bush stole the election". According to The Huffington Post's Fundrace 2008, Murphy had donated $850 to Clinton's presidential campaign through Q3 2008. Marcotte's accusation, however, omits Murphy's campaign contributions to Clinton. FEC records show a $200 donation to WomenCount PAC by Murphy in June 2008. Bower rejects the claims of Marcotte and others: "People have been trying to paint this as a Trojan horse, you know, as though I'm a Republican, that this was a Republican strategy ... No, that's not it at all. From dog-catcher to president, I've voted Democrat."

Florida Representative Debbie Wasserman Schultz, a Clinton supporter, argued that while she saw why many subscribed to the "PUMA attitude", she argued that for "reproductive rights, the economy and a range of other issues, the only choice was Obama", and that voting for McCain, or letting him win by default, was worse than not having Clinton as the nominee. House Speaker Nancy Pelosi stated that PUMAs and other Clinton supporters "have been less than gracious" for their continuing refusal to support Obama.

DNC Rules and Bylaws Committee co-chair James Roosevelt disputed the claim that the Michigan–Florida delegate decision was in any way preordained to favor Obama. He argued that party rules and regulations were "followed and interpreted fairly," saying that there were allegations of impropriety in the Texas caucuses, but only one complaint was filed with a delegate.

After McCain's defeat in the general election, some commentators accused PUMA of essentially misrepresenting their influence or numbers, as some exit polls showed that Obama won over 90% of the Democratic vote. Later studies, however, found that between 24% and 25% of voters who supported Clinton in the primary voted for McCain in the general election.

Among the anti-PUMA blogs, StupidPumas! posted copies of official letters sent to PUMA-PAC from the Federal Election Commission, demanding the filing of long-overdue financial reports.

== PUMA film ==
In 2009, Los Angeles filmmakers Brad Mays and Lorenda Starfelt finished work on their feature-length political documentary The Audacity of Democracy, which followed the 2008 race for the Democratic presidential nomination and focused in particular on PUMA. Shot from June through September 2008, Mays and Starfelt filmed interviews and political activity in Los Angeles, Princeton, Dallas, Austin, Washington, D.C., Chicago, New York City and at the 2008 Democratic National Convention in Denver. Mays came under almost immediate fire from pro-Obama groups, citing conflict of interest due to the production having been financed by PUMA-PAC itself. Mays acknowledged these concerns but maintained that his film would be an objective account of what he saw and heard during the primary. About a week before the convention, all of Mays' camera equipment was stolen en route to Chicago. Most of the gear was eventually replaced, but the crucial Chicago shoot was seriously compromised. When Mays decided to film interviews with Internet journalist Tommy Christopher, an outspoken PUMA critic, the rank and file of the PUMA movement quickly denounced the filmmaker, distancing themselves from the entire project.

In multiple subsequent Blog-Radio interviews, Mays has expressed extreme dissatisfaction with the finished film, revealing that he had not been allowed to complete shooting in the manner originally agreed to, and adding that many of the PUMA members who had decided to switch their support from Clinton to McCain did not care for the way their newfound Republican leanings played onscreen.

== See also ==
- McCain Democrat
