= SING*ularity =

- Directed by: Brad Mays
- Written by: Brad Mays
- Produced by: Brad Mays, Lorenda Starfelt
- Starring: Ann Baltz, David Aks, Dan Bridston, Paula Thomson, Priti Gandhi, Laura Bohn
- Cinematography: Brad Mays, Lorenda Starfelt
- Edited by: Brad Mays
- Music by: Various
- Release date: 2009
- Running time: 96 minutes
- Country: United States
- Language: English

SING*ularity (also known as OperaWorks) is an independent documentary film produced and directed by Brad Mays, and co-produced by Lorenda Starfelt at LightSong Films in North Hollywood.

Deriving its title from Shakespeare's Twelfth Night - "put thyself into the trick of singularity" - SING*ularity portrays the approach of OperaWorks, a training program in Northridge, California for opera singers founded by Ann Baltz in which the entire body is engaged. This approach to tuning the "total instrument" is rooted in various avant-garde techniques common to theatre training, but unique to the world of classical music.

The film follows a group of singers - both student and professional - through the entire course, where they are instructed in Yoga, movement, visualization, conducting, acting and, of course, given traditional vocal coaching. The singers are also taught to improvise arias in a manner not unlike the scat approach used by jazz vocalists.
