= Bob Golub =

American comedian

- Born: September 6, 1957 (age 68); Sharon, Pennsylvania, U.S.
- Occupations: Stand-up comedian, actor, writer, director, producer
- Years active: 1979–present
- Spouse: Emile Golub
- Website: bobgolub.com

Bob Golub (born September 6, 1957) is an American comedian, actor, writer, and filmmaker of Polish descent, whose work is largely inspired by his childhood experiences of growing up in a dysfunctional home located in the steel-mill town of Farrell, Pennsylvania.

== Career ==
Bob Golub began his career as a stand-up comedian in the 1980s. He appeared in clubs in New York City, Pittsburgh, Miami, Las Vegas and Los Angeles. He has appeared in Goodfellas, Art School Confidential, The Glass Beads, Johnny Virus, The Kings of Brooklyn, and The Watermelon.

From 2003 to 2006, Golub toured with his one-man show, Dodo. The show derives its title from the nickname given to Golub's deceased father, who, having lost an eye as a child, was unable to obtain work and began a family roof-repair business. In the show, Dodo is portrayed as an angry and frustrated alcoholic, who routinely beat his wife and children. Golub has stated that this influenced his career, as he sought to become funny enough to make his father laugh in spite of his anger, thus deflecting violence.

Golub's self-written, self-directed independent feature docu-comedy Dodo was released in 2010 by Celebrity Video Distribution. The show is a mix of taped live performance, professionally shot auto-biographical recreations of past events, and hundreds of hours of home video featuring himself and his family.

== Family ==
Golub has three children: Peyton, Parker, and Piper. Piper is a freshman writing student at New York University Tisch School of the Arts.

== Selected filmography ==
Year	Film	Role	Notes
1990	Goodfellas	Truck Driver at diner	
1997	EZ Streets (two episodes)	Tommy O	Two episodes: "A Ceremony of Innocence" and "A Terrible Beauty"
2004	The Kings of Brooklyn	Ump	
2005	Johnny Virus	Barny	
2006	Art School Confidential	Hector	
2008	The Watermelon	Creon	
2010	Dodo	Various, himself	Also writer, director
