= Darragh Murphy =

Darragh Murphy is an American activist based in Boston. Murphy is best known for founding and leading PUMA PAC during the 2008 United States presidential election to oppose the candidacy of Barack Obama in the general election after having supported the candidacy of Hillary Clinton against him in the Democratic primaries. A longtime resident of the Dorchester neighborhood of Boston, Murphy has more recently been involved in activism related to the Boston Public Schools

== Early life and family ==
Murphy grew up in the Dorchester neighborhood of Boston, Massachusetts. She lived in Dorchester until she was 31-years-old, later moving to Carlisle, Massachusetts before 2008. By 2021, she had become a Dorchester resident again. Murphy attended Boston Latin School in the 1980s. She is the mother of three children.

Murphy is sisters with Erin Murphy, a current member of the Boston City Council. Her grandfather, Richard Murphy, founded the Dorchester United Neighborhood Association and has a public school in Boston named for him.

Murphy has identified herself as a lifelong member of the Democratic Party. Through 2008, Murphy's only donation directly to a presidential candidate had been a $500 contribution to John McCain's campaign in the 2000 Republican presidential primaries.

== People United Means Action ==
Murphy attained political note during the 2008 United States presidential election, becoming a prominent for her activism in opposition to the candidacy of Barack Obama, after having supported the campaign of Hillary Clinton against him in the Democratic primaries. Murphy had initially supported the campaign of John Edwards in the Democratic primary, but shifted her support to Clinton after coming to disliking the skew of coverage about Clinton in the lead up to the New Hampshire primary, objecting particularly to the media's heavy focus on whether Clinton had cried during a public appearance. She believed that the tone of this coverage was unfair and sexist towards Clinton (the only significant female contender for a major party nomination in 2008); that the Obama campaign had been complicit in this by failing to take a stand against sexist coverage of Clinton; and that Obama's campaign had reaped benefit from a sexist media slant towards Clinton. After deciding to switch her support from Edwards to Clinton, Murphy donated $200 to a political action committee that supported Clinton's candidacy.

In mid-2008, Murphy founded PUMA PAC, an organization which opposed the nomination of Obama after he had become presumptive nominee. Her organization opposed both the Democratic National Committee's rulings in relation to the 2008 primary process and the prospect of voting for Obama in the general election. She filed the papers to start the organization on June 3, the day before Obama became the Democratic Party's presumptive nominee. served as head of the organization, as its executive director.

Ahead of the 2008 Democratic National Convention, Murphy and PUMA hoped to pressure the Democratic National Committee to make rulings on delegate allocation that, if implemented, were expected to position Clinton to win a nominating roll call instead of Obama. They also advocated for a full nomination roll call to take place at the convention instead of an abbreviated nomination by mere acclamation, which did wind up being arranged. After Obama was nominated at the convention, Murphy declared that she planned not to vote for Obama in the general election and expected that many other Clinton supporters would do the same.

Murphy was one of the main subjects of the documentary The Audacity of Democracy, which the PAC funded.

In October 2008, Murphy apologized for PUMA PAC having perpetuated an internet hoax claiming that Michelle Obama had signed an exorbitant room service receipt at the Waldorf-Astoria Hotel. The claim was a fictitious online hoax, and PUMA PAC had initially contributed to its spread by citing the story in an anti-Obama flyer posted on the PAC's blog. Murphy had the post removed from the organization's blog.

In early 2015, ahead of the 2016 Democratic presidential primaries in which Clinton ran again, Murphy told The Washington Post that she did not believe that a re-start of PUMA PAC would be necessary, remarking, "I can’t foresee the same contention that we had in 2008. I think the party will be united behind her more or less."

== Subsequent politics ==
In the early 2020s, Murphy emerged as a parent activist on issues relating to the Boston Public Schools. She has run a Facebook group called "BPS Watch", and served as a leader in the Boston Parent Coalition for Academic Excellence. Murphy advocated in opposition to efforts to eliminate the admission exams used for the city's exam schools. In 2021, when changes to exam schools admissions processes were adjusted amid the COVID pandemic, she advocated against the adjustments made. During a Boston School Committee scandal that same year involving text exchanges by its members, Murphy made a request for the texts to be released.

During a controversial redistricting debate on the Boston City Council, councilor Kendra Lara accused Murphy of running a "hate campaign" against her.
