= Hildegarde Haas =

American artist (1926–2002)

Hildegarde Haas (1926–2002) was an American artist. She was born in Frankfurt, Germany and moved to the US with her parents in 1937.

== Biography ==
Haas attended the Colorado Springs Fine Arts Center for summer classes before attending the University of Chicago for two years. When she received a scholarship to the Art Students League of New York she began studying under Vaclav Vytlacil and Morris Kantor. After seven years she was forced to give up carving due to the physical demands of the craft and she picked up painting instead.

In 1951, Haas relocated to Northern California and became involved with Bay Area arts organizations.

Haas's work was included in the 2009 exhibit, "California in Relief A History in Wood and Linocut Prints" at St. Mary's College of California's Hearst Art Gallery in Moraga. In 2022, the Kevin Christopher Gallery held an exhibit of Haas's work, "Hildegarde Haas and Synesthesia."

== Collections ==
- Museum of Modern Art, New York
- Smithsonian American Art Museum
- National Gallery of Art, Washington
- Dallas Museum of Art
- Pennsylvania Academy of the Fine Arts
- Cleveland Museum of Art
- Seattle Art Museum
- Minneapolis Institute of Art
