= Rain Pryor =

American actress

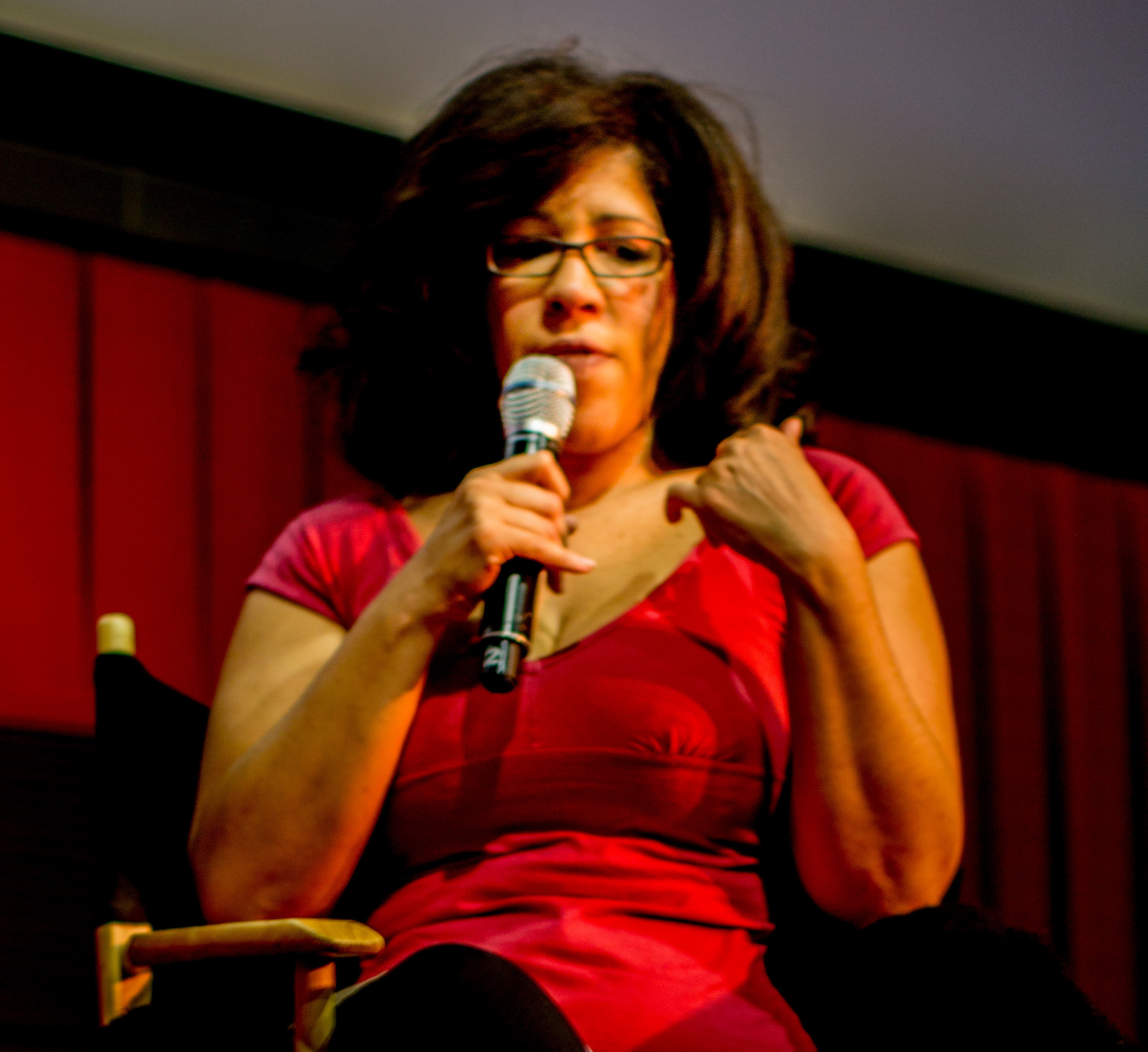
- Pryor at the 2016 Atlanta Jewish Film Festival
- Born: July 16, 1968 (age 58); Los Angeles, California, U.S.
- Occupations: Actress; comedian
- Years active: 1988–present
- Spouses: Kevin Kindlin (m. 2002; div. 2006) Yale Partlow (m. 2007; div. 2012) David Vane (m. 2018)
- Children: 1
- Father: Richard Pryor
- Relatives: Elizabeth Stordeur Pryor (half-sister); Ludacris (third cousin)

Rain Pryor (born July 16, 1968) is an American actress. Her television credits include sitcoms Head of the Class and Rude Awakening. She is the daughter of comedian Richard Pryor.

== Early life ==
Pryor was born in Los Angeles, California, the daughter of Shelley R. (née Bonus) and comedian Richard Pryor. Rain Pryor's mother was a Jewish go-go dancer and Rain was largely raised with her Jewish maternal grandparents, who taught her about Jewish culture. Her award-winning solo show Fried Chicken and Latkes explores racism in the late 1960s and early 1970s. In regard to her background, Pryor has joked that while growing up she felt "proud, but guilty about it."

Pryor graduated from Beverly Hills High School in 1986.

== Career ==
She went on to star in the ABC series Head of the Class in the role of Theola June 'T.J.' Jones. Pryor's role was created from a series of characters she performed at her audition for the producers. Pryor starred for several years as Jackie, the lipstick-lesbian drug addict on the Showtime series Rude Awakening, and has guest-starred on network television series such as The Division and Chicago Hope. She has appeared numerous times on both The Tonight Show Starring Johnny Carson and The Tonight Show with Jay Leno, as well as The Late Late Show with Craig Ferguson, and The Tavis Smiley Show.

Pryor's stage credits include playing the title role of Billie Holiday in the UK tour of the Billie Holiday Story and the title role of Ella Fitzgerald in the UK premiere of Ella, Meet Marilyn. She performed in the Los Angeles productions of Eve Ensler's The Vagina Monologues with Nora Dunn (of Saturday Night Live fame) and Charlene Tilton; Joan by Linda Chambers, in which she portrayed Joan of Arc; Cookin' With Gas, with the Groundlings improvisation troupe; The Exonerated with critically acclaimed actor Aidan Quinn; and The Who's Tommy at the La Jolla Playhouse.

Pryor has also performed as a jazz/blues vocalist since 1993, having played to sold-out crowds in Los Angeles, DC, Hong Kong, Scotland and London, where she released a performance CD, Rain Pryor Live in London.

Pryor created and toured in the award-winning show based on her life, Fried Chicken and Latkes, in 2004 and 2005. She appeared in the Edinburgh Fringe Festival in 2006.

In 2012, Pryor was named the artistic director of Baltimore's Strand Theater.

In 2015, Pryor received the inaugural British Urban Film Festival honorary award from Ellen Thomas on behalf of her father for his outstanding contribution to film and television. The festival also screened the UK premiere of That Daughter's Crazy, a documentary about her life living in the spotlight of her famous father.

In August 2019, Pryor announced that she would run for the 3rd district of the Baltimore City Council as a Democrat in 2020, challenging incumbent Ryan Dorsey. Pryor was defeated by Dorsey in the Democratic primary election, placing second with 36.1% of the vote.

== Author ==
ReganBooks published her memoir Jokes My Father Never Taught Me in 2006.

== Personal life ==
In 2002, Pryor married family therapist Kevin Kindlin; they divorced in 2006.

Pryor has described her Jewish practice as including lighting Shabbat candles, observing Jewish holidays and marking the yahrzeits of her father and grandfather.

In 2007, she began dating Yale Partlow, a Baltimore nursing student/meditation teacher who later became a police officer. After many miscarriages, she gave birth to their daughter in 2008. Partlow and Pryor divorced in 2014. Pryor currently lives in Baltimore with daughter and husband, Dave Vane.

== Awards and nominations ==
- 2015 British Urban Film Festival honorary award (recipient) – on behalf of Richard Pryor (posthumously)
- 2008 Marin Services For Women Founders Award (recipient)
- 2007 NAACP Image Award, Best New Author Biography (nomination) – Jokes My Father Never Taught Me, Life, Love & Loss with Richard Pryor
- 2007 African American Literary Awards (nomination) – Jokes My Father Never Taught Me:Life, Love & Loss with Richard Pryor
- 2005 NAACP Theatre Award, Best Female Performer Equity (recipient) – Fried Chicken & Latkes
- 2005 NAACP Best Original Playwright Equity (nominated) – Fried Chicken & Latkes
- 2005 Invisible Theatre's Goldie Klein Guest Artist Award (recipient) – Fried Chicken & Latkes
- 2004 Los Angeles Ovation Awards, Best Solo Performance (nominated)
