= Peter J. Haas (rabbi) =

American Reform Judaism rabbi

Peter J. Haas is an American Reform Judaism rabbi who was the Abba Hillel Silver Professor of Jewish Studies at Case Western Reserve University.

== Education and career ==
Haas earned a bachelor's degree in Ancient Near Eastern History from the University of Michigan in 1970. After studying for a M.A.H.L. at Hebrew Union College, he was ordained in 1974. He completed a Ph.D. in Religious Studies and History of Religions (Judaism) from Brown University in 1980.

He taught at Vanderbilt University from 1980 to 2000, when he moved to Case as Abba Hillel Silver Professor. He was the president of Scholars for Peace in the Middle East in 2010–2011.

== Works ==
In 1988, Haas published Morality after Auschwitz: The Radical Challenge of the Nazi Ethic to favorable reviews; it was listed as an outstanding book by Choice and nominated for the Grawemeyer Award in Religion. In 1996, he published Responsa: Literary History and Basic Literacy; Haym Soloveitchik was scathing in his assessment.
