= Sascha Haas =

German politician (born 1990)

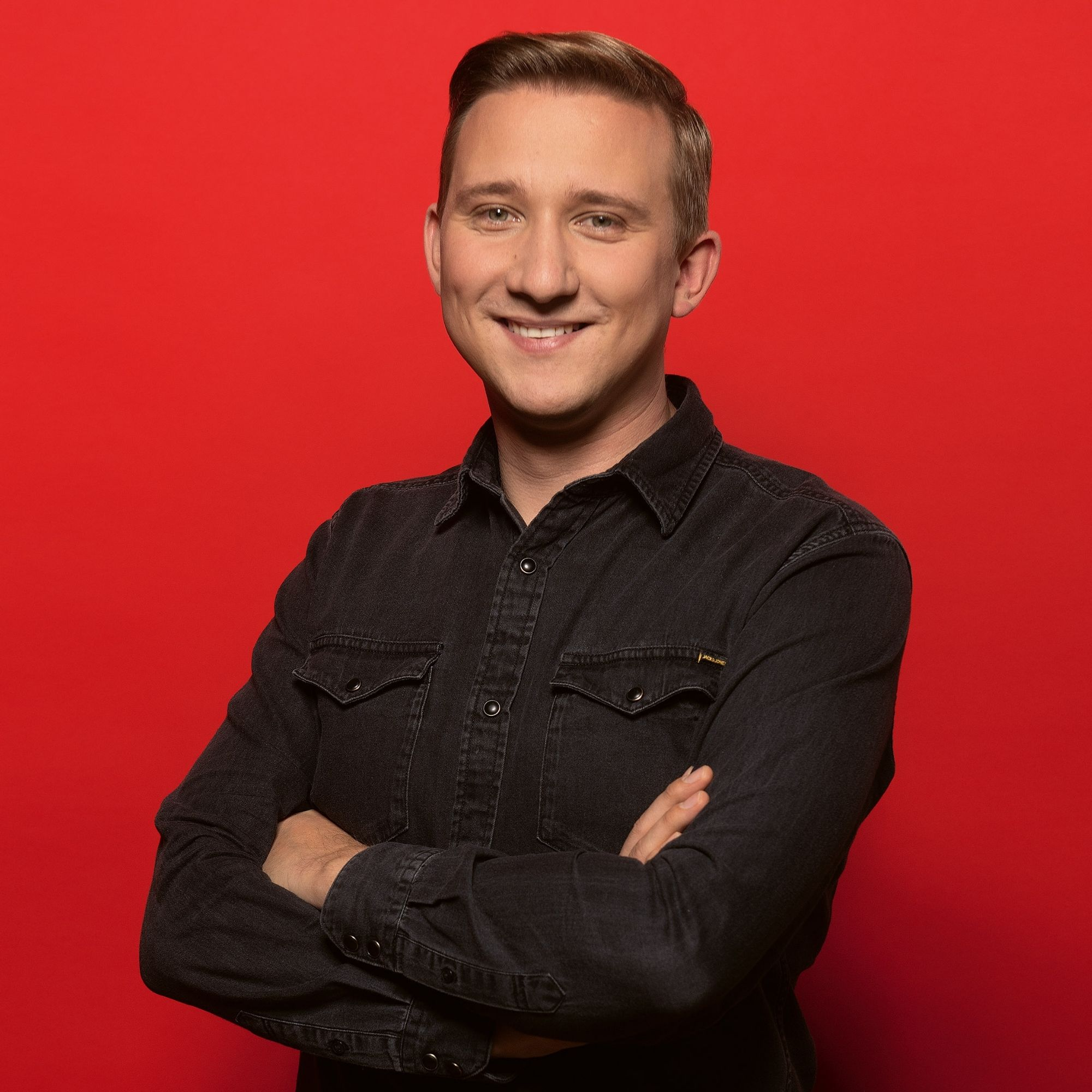
- Haas in 2022

Member of the Landtag of Saarland
- Incumbent
- Assumed office 25 April 2022

Personal details
- Born: 1 September 1990 (age 35) Saarbrücken-Dudweiler
- Party: Social Democratic Party (since 2007)

Sascha Haas (born 1 September 1990 in Saarbrücken-Dudweiler) is a German politician serving as a member of the Landtag of Saarland since 2022. He has served as chairman of the Social Democratic Party in Sankt Johann since 2017.
