= Linda Chambers (playwright) =

American dramatist

- Born: 1954 (age 71–72); Baltimore, Maryland

Linda Chambers is an American playwright, screenwriter, actress and college instructor living and working in Baltimore, Maryland.

== Career ==
Linda Chambers first began serious writing after becoming involved with Corner Theatre ETC, an experimental theatre located in Baltimore. Although her first work at Corner was as an actress - she appeared in the lead role of Steve Yeager's acclaimed 1976 production of Marguerite, written by C. Richard Gillespie - she became increasing drawn into a circle of playwrights whose work was being produced there. In 1981, Chambers moved to New York City with the intention of pursuing a professional theatrical career. In 1982, an evening of three one-act plays written by Chambers was presented off-Broadway at the Cubiculo Theatre under the direction of Brad Mays: Requiem, a fictionalized drama about Irish hunger striker Bobby Sands, Joan, a short meditation on Joan of Arc, and Stones, a two character piece of religious allegory. In 1983, Ms. Chambers appeared in the off-Broadway production of The Water Hen, written by Stanisław Ignacy Witkiewicz also directed by Mays. Theatre critic Mark Matusek praised Ms. Chamber's performance for oozing "seedy pulchritude."

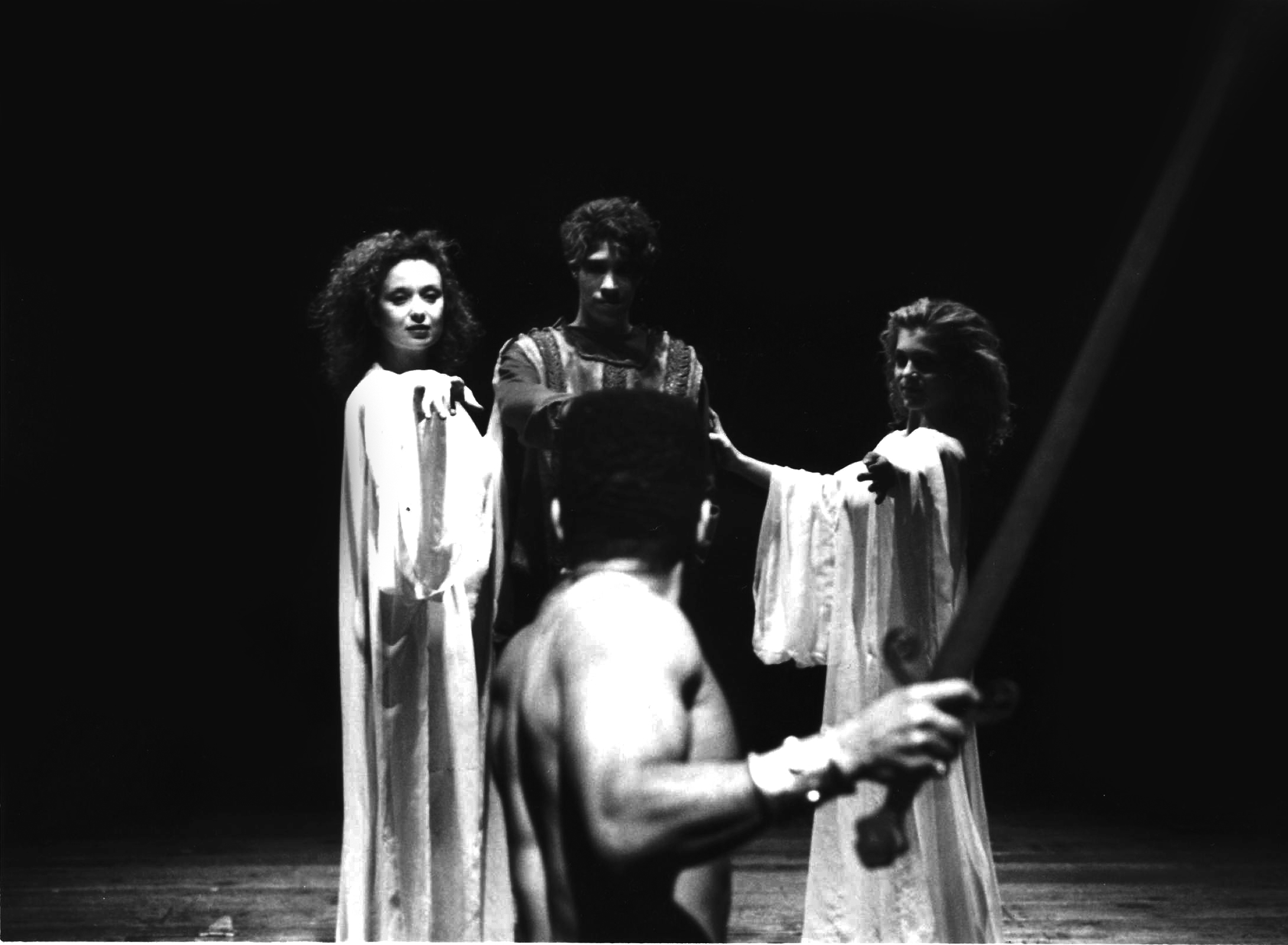
Rain Pryor as Joan of Arc, with Robin Skye, Zoe Trilling, and Tyrone Granderson Jones in Brad Mays' 2003 Los Angeles stage production of Joan, written by Linda Chambers.

Later that year, Ms. Chambers' play Requiem was picked by the Maryland Center for Public Broadcasting for a series of 30 minute television dramas written by Maryland playwrights. In 1985, Chambers' full-length play Avalon was produced at New York's Theatre 22, under the direction of Nancy Powichroski.

The independent feature film On The Block was released in 1990. Directed by Steve Yeager, the film was co-written by Yeager and Chambers, and featured Baltimore native Howard Rollins in a special supporting role. In 1993, an expanded full length version of Joan was produced in Los Angeles, starring Rain Pryor in the role of Joan of Arc.
