= Yvette Hass =

Swedish fashion designer

- Born: Yvette Hass; January 17, 1985 (age 41); Sweden
- Occupation: Fashion designer
- Label: YVETTE HASS
- Website: http://www.yvettehass.com

Yvette Hass (born January 17, 1985) is a Sweden-based fashion designer known for designing watches and women's wear. She is head of design and chief executive officer of her company, BY YVETTE HASS.

== Personal life ==
Hass was born in Trelleborg, Sweden. She is of American, German and Swedish descent.

== Career ==
Already at the age of 4 Hass designed her first dress, a light-blue princess dress. Eventually she studied design in Malmö Fashion College, and before she was done with the training she had already received her first job as a designer.

Hass worked with some Swedish brands before she went to Hong Kong, to try her "wings" as a Design and Marketing manager. The employment also included designing and developing collections for the international market. Many experiences and contacts later she returned and founded her own collection.

Among the celebrities who have worn Hass’ designs are Kenza, Isabella Löwengrip, Laila Bagge, Valeria Mangani, and Sanna Nielsen.

Yvette Hass clothes are worn in upcoming edition of Elle Sweden as quoted by Elle photographer on Facebook

December 3, 2014. Elle DK Magazine quotes online : "Yvette Hass Designer - From Feeric Fashion Week to an upcoming designer in the world to keep an eye on" about 10 hours ago by Mira @thesecretcodeditor (accessed December 4, 2014 at https://web.archive.org/web/20141211024855/https://sbaam.com/frame/huboeftr8fk/yvette-hass-designer-from-feeric-fashion-days-to-an-upcoming-designer-in-the-world-to-keep-an-eye-on.

YH was also featured in an editorial by Volt magazine November 10 (accessed at http://www.voltcafe.com/).

YH was also featured in a spread from CHIC Magazine featuring YH Leaf Bomber and Leaf Mini Skirt worn by model Elsa Hosk in cat on a hot tin roof article. And, in November the same Victoria's Secret Angel model wore YH clothing in the magazine.

YH clothing has been seen on television. A YH Leaf Bomber Jacket was worn by Josefin Myrberg on Idol October 10, 2014 (http://www.tv4.se/idol/klipp/josefine-myrberg-holding-out-for-a-hero-2986545). Further, beautiful Valeria Mangani attends the Fox International Channels Party at Villa Aurelia in Rome, Italy wearing YH leather jacket in powder puff.

YH feather maxi skirt is featured on Kenza Zouiten, Sweden's biggest fashion and lifestyle blogger. editorial available at www.ramihanna.se, http://lindahallberg.se/ and https://web.archive.org/web/20141203115459/http://www.kenzas.se/
