= Bob Haas (Canadian football) =

American gridiron football player

Profile
- Position: Center

Personal information
- Born: c. 1930; Dayton, Ohio, U.S.
- Listed height: 6 ft 1 in (1.85 m)
- Listed weight: 220 lb (100 kg)

Career information
- College: Tulsa

Career history
- 1956: Winnipeg Blue Bombers

Bob Haas (born c. 1930) is a retired Canadian football player who played for the Winnipeg Blue Bombers. He played college football at the University of Tulsa.
