= Michael Haas =

Michael Haas may refer to:

- Michael Haas (political scientist) (born 1938), professor at California Polytechnic University, Pomona
- Mike Haas (born 1958), American soccer player
- Michael Haaß (born 1983), German handball player
