= Kim Weild =

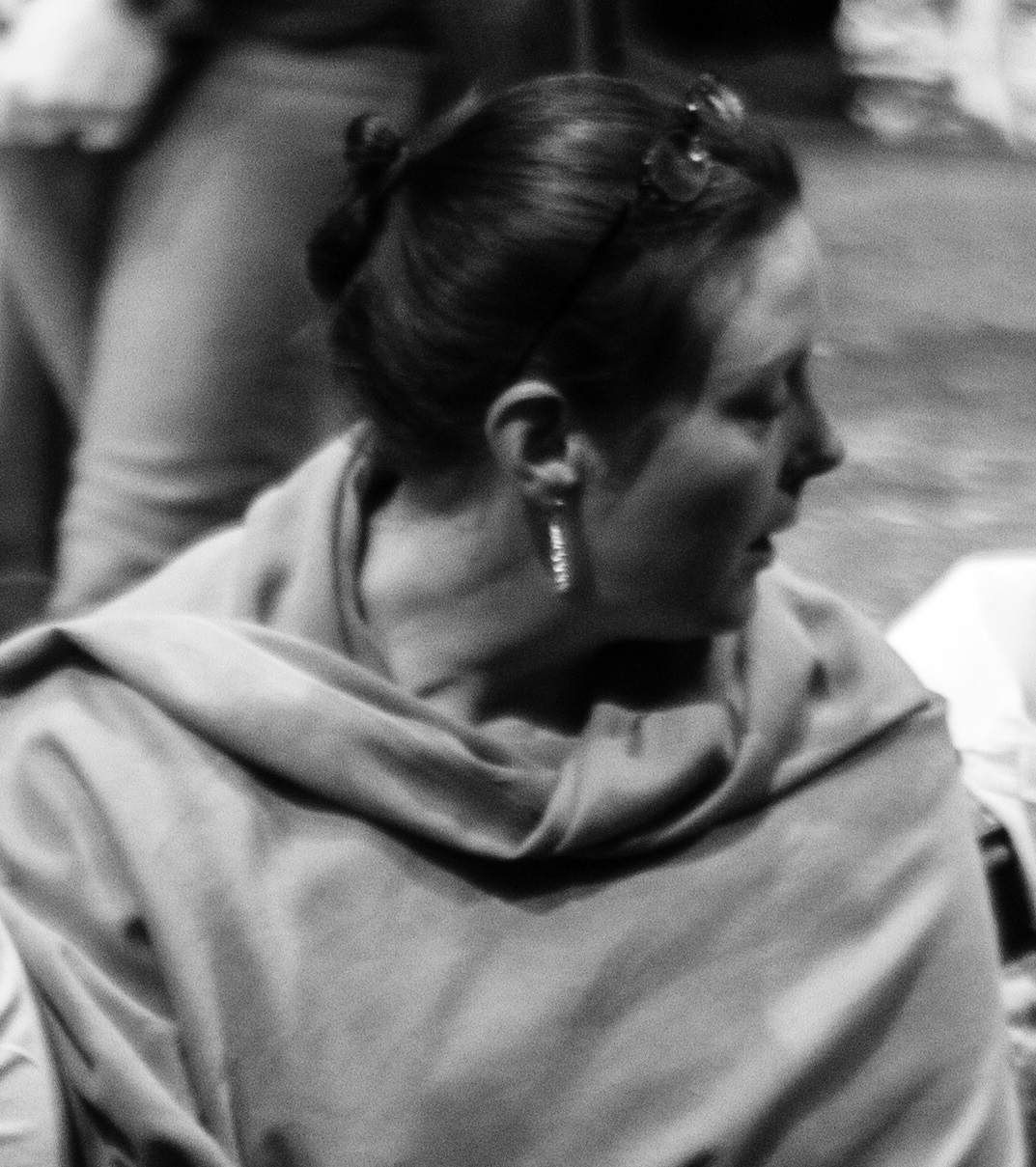
- Weild working on a production of Soot and Spit in 2013
- Occupations: Director, choreographer

Kim Weild is a Drama Desk Award-nominated American theatre director, educator, writer, actor and choreographer.

== Background ==
As an actor and dancer, Kim Weild has performed in both Europe and the United States. Among her many collaborators and associates are Anne Bogart (SITI Co.), Diane Paulus, Tina Kronis and Richard Algers, George Balanchine, Caryl Churchill, Max Stafford-Clark, Simon Curtis, André Gregory, Antoinette LaFarge, Judith Malina, Larry Moss, Mike Nichols, George Morrison, Sabrina Peck, Richard Schechner, Paul Sills, Tadashi Suzuki and Robert Wilson. She is also featured in American Contemporary video artist Bill Viola's artwork The Raft.

In 2015 she was appointed Visiting Associate Professor of Theatre at Wesleyan University in Middletown, Connecticut where she taught directing of and acting. In 2017 she joined the faculty of Carnegie Mellon University's School of Drama] where she is the chair of the John Wells Directing Program.

She is also a faculty member at the National Theater Institute at the Eugene O'Neill Theater Center.

== Education ==
She earned her BFA in Drama with Honors from New York University Tisch School of the Arts and her MFA in directing from Columbia University School of the Arts where she was mentored by Anne Bogart, Brian Kulick and André Serban.

== Directorial work ==
Weild studied for ten years at The School of American Ballet, during which time she frequently performed with the New York City Ballet. In 2007 she completed her graduate work at Columbia University's three-year MFA directing program. Her directorial work includes the NY premiere of Charles L. Mee's Fêtes de la Nuit which received a Drama Desk Award nomination for Unique Theatrical Experience and also garnered 7 New York Innovative Theatre Foundation nominations winning two.

Weild, who has a deaf brother, has created and directed work with Deaf and hearing artists that incorporates American Sign Language. In 2017 she directed the world premier of playwright Charles Mee's Soot and Spit about deaf outsider artist James Castle. The piece received critical praise, was a NY Times Critic's Pick, and was awarded the New York Innovative Theatre Foundation Award for Outstanding Performance Art Production.

At the Cherry Lane Theatre she directed the first New York revival of Mee's First Love, starring Academy Award nominee Michael O'Keefe and Angelina Fiordellisi. Additional directing credits include Mee's Big Love, Harold Pinter's A Kind of Alaska as part of the inaugural NY Live Arts/Live Ideas which celebrated the work of Oliver Sacks, the Off-Broadway world premiere of Luigi Creatore's An Error of the Moon, Uncle Vanya (Official selection Prague Quadrennial), Kaddish by Allen Ginsberg for the New York International Fringe Festival, The Good Woman of Setzuan with original music by Two Star Symphony, My Fair Lady, Eccentricities of a Nightingale, Endgame, Andrea Lepcio's A Peddler's Tale: Buttons, Guts and Bluetooth, as the Foeller Fellow she created a new conceptualization of Paradise Now for the Williamstown Theater Festival, and A Decade of Dreams: Celebrating the Music of the Young People’s Chorus of New York at Carnegie Hall. She is the director for Keith Hamilton Cobb's American Moor, which was recognized with the prestigious Elliot Norton Award for Outstanding Solo Performance and two IRNE awards including Outstanding Visiting Production.

On Broadway, she was Associate Director to Michael Blakemore having worked with him on the Broadway revival of Blithe Spirit starring Angela Lansbury, and previously on Terrence McNally's Deuce, and Mark Twain/David Ives' Is He Dead? Additionally, Weild has acted as Associate Director for Tina Landau on Tarell McCraney's WIG OUT!, and Charles Mee's Iphigenia 2.0 at The Signature Theater and Gabriel Barre on the world premiere of the musical Amazing Grace, which opened on Broadway at The Nederlander Theater on July 16, 2015. Weild co-wrote the musical Dusty which played on London's West End for eight months.

During a period of several years spent on the West Coast, Weild was a Founding Artistic Director of Burning Wheel and designed and executed the movement scoring for director Brad Mays' controversial 1997 adaptation of Euripides's The Bacchae which was nominated for three LA Weekly Theatre Awards.

She directs workshops and readings at Goodspeed Musicals, Lincoln Center Theater, Primary Stages, New York Theatre Workshop, Ma-Yi 2 G, New Georges, Epiphany Ensemble and Columbia Stages.
