= OperaWorks =

Opera training program

- Type: Summer Program, a 501(c)3 non-profit organization.
- Established: 1987
- President: Ann Baltz
- Academic staff: 16
- Location: Northridge, California, United States
- Website: OperaWorks.com

OperaWorks is an opera training program, founded by program director Ann Baltz, and conducted in Northridge, California, USA.

== Description ==
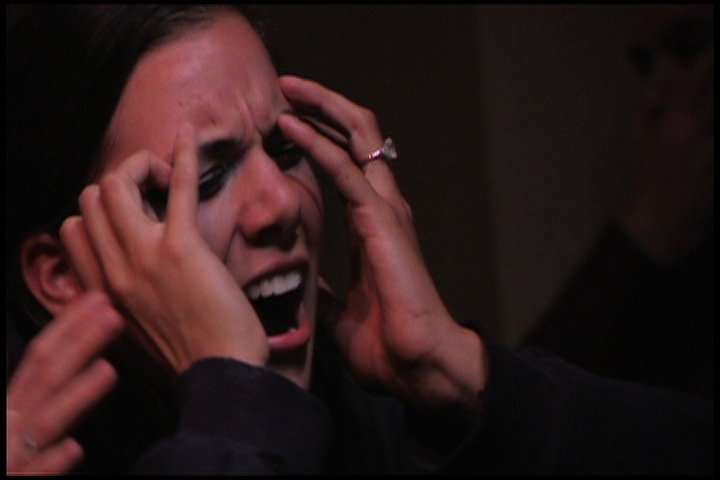
Performance scene from the 2009 documentary SING*ularity about OperaWorks, directed by Brad Mays, produced by Lorenda Starfeld

OperaWorks is a training program for singers and instructors working in the field of classical music. Accepting a limited number of students selected each year from up to eight cities across the United States, the program operates from the beginning of June and runs through the end of July, annually. OperaWorks was founded in 1987 by classical pianist Ann Baltz as a response to what she saw as the myopic tendencies of conventional operatic training. Baltz envisioned a new approach to the training of vocalists, in which the "total instrument" would be addressed, not just the voice itself. Over the years, her program has expanded to include instruction in movement, Yoga, acting, visualization, conducting, improvisation and the Alexander technique, as well as career management.

In 2006, Baltz invited independent filmmaker Brad Mays to spend an entire summer filming the various classes and events at OperaWorks. The results are to be seen in the documentary feature film SING*ularity.

== Notable alumni ==
- Grammy Awards: Hila Plitmann, Priti Gandhi, Jessica Rivera
- Metropolitan Opera: Julie Makerov, Jessica Rivera, Rebecca Ringle, Michael Chioldi, Ashley Emerson, Robert McPherson
- New York City Opera: Raymond Ayers, Randall Scotting, Priti Gandhi, Basia Revi, Rebecca Ringle
- Los Angeles Opera: Michael Chioldi, Erica Wueschner, Priti Gandhi
- Solo Pop recording artist: Arden Kaywin
