= Robert Bernard Hass =

American poet, literary critic, and professor

- Occupations: Poet; Professor; Literary Critic

Robert Bernard Hass (born 1962) is an American poet, literary critic, and professor.

== Life and work ==
Robert Bernard Hass is the author of Going by Contraries: Robert Frost's Conflict With Science (University of Virginia Press, 2002), which was selected by Choice as an Outstanding Academic Title in 2003. He is also the author of the poetry collection, Counting Thunder, published by David Robert Books in 2008, and co-editor of the Letters of Robert Frost (Harvard University Press). His articles and poems have appeared in a number of journals including Poetry, Sewanee Review, Agni, Black Warrior Review, Studies in English Literature, and the Journal of Modern Literature. He has won an Academy of American Poets Prize, an AWP Intro Journals Award and a creative writing fellowship to Bread Loaf. Hass grew up in Hershey, Pennsylvania. He received his B.A., M.F.A., and Ph.D. from Pennsylvania State University in 1985, 1993, and 1999, and a M.A. from the University of Florida in 1987, studying under Donald Justice; he is currently Professor of English at Edinboro University of Pennsylvania, where he teaches courses in American literature and Shakespeare.
