= Robert Haas (clergyman) =

Robert Haas (fl. 1836–1868) was a German Lutheran minister who advocated the civil equality of Jews in Germany.

== Life ==
Haas was at Bechtheim, and in 1833 became chaplain at Grävenwiesbach. From 1836 he was at Dotzheim near Wiesbaden. In 1837 the University of Giessen awarded him a doctorate based on two of his works.

Active in the Duchy of Nassau, Haas counted Reform Jewish leader Abraham Geiger among his friends. Geiger wrote of him as "Robert Haas, now pastor in Dotzheim, with whom frequent visits are exchanged, a man full of peculiarities and ambiguities, but idealistis and unprejudiced."

Haas endorsed the 1837 rabbinical convention in Wiesbaden. That same year, he produced a circular addressed to "all Christians in Germany," calling on them to assist in the establishment of a faculty of Jewish studies at a German university.

== Works ==
Haas published several works, most notably Das Staatsbürgertum der Juden vom Standpunkt der Inneren Politik. Also:

- Vermischte Schriften (1844)
