= Kim Haas =

American journalist

- Born: Philadelphia, Pennsylvania
- Occupation: Journalist

Kim Haas is an American journalist. She is the producer and host of the PBS series Afro-Latino Travels with Kim Haas.

== Biography ==
Haas was born in Philadelphia, Pennsylvania, to Rose and Spencer Lewis. She grew up in the West Mount Airy neighborhood and attended Philadelphia High School for Girls. After graduating in 1986, she attended the University of Pittsburgh, where she majored in Spanish and graduated in 1990. In 1996, Haas earned a master's degree in bilingual and bicultural studies from La Salle University.

Haas worked in the media for over 20 years for outlets including Telemundo, where she was marketing director for the Philadelphia station WWSI-TV, and as a pledge host for WYBE-TV.

In 2020, Haas created a series on PBS stations called Afro-Latino Travels with Kim Haas, with a grant from the Ford Foundation. Inspired by a visit to Acapulco, Mexico with her grandmother as a child and her time studying abroad in Seville, Spain during college, the show featured Black people's contributions to Spanish-speaking countries, out of her wish to see more Afro-Latino representation on television. While Haas had initially pitched the show around 2009 to public television in Miami, it took several years for her to get funding and for tourism boards to sign on. Another inspiration Haas cited was the travel shows of Anthony Bourdain.

The series premiered September 12, 2020. Its first two episodes were set in San José and Limón in Costa Rica and focused on Jamaican immigrants in the country, in particular their role in building its railroad. Haas had planned to shoot future episodes that fall in Salvador, Bahia and Rio de Janeiro in Brazil, but the COVID-19 pandemic stalled those plans. The third episode was shot in Cali, Colombia and is slated to air in 2023.

Haas currently lives in Jersey City and runs a communications firm in North Jersey and a blog, Los Afros Latinos, about Afro-Latino culture.
