= Peter W. Haas =

Slovak art photographer

Peter W. Haas (born in 1964, in Czechoslovakia), is a Slovak art photographer. He is a member of the International Association of Art. He focuses on analogue photography and techniques such as platinotype, bromoil and kallitype. His pieces appear in many collections in Europe, the US, Russia, and Australia.

== Early life ==
He was born on 25 June 1964 in Czechoslovakia. He spent his youth in Banská Štiavnica where began to express himself artistically. Poetry, writing, and painting brought him to photography.

== Career ==
He was influenced by Vlado Oravec and his wife. After the Velvet Revolution in 1989 he pursued a career of freelance art photography. He opened two studios in Banská Štiavnica. In 1994 he met professional photographer Leo Redlinger who taught him about photographing products and noble prints. His work attracted the interest of diplomatic staff. Haas became an official photographer of several sovereigns and Ambassadors. Beginning in 2000 he began taking contact photos and supervised by Dušan Slivka pursued noble prints.

He was greatly affected by functionalists and pictorialists like Rössler, Drtikol and Sudek, who transformed photography into art.

== Independent exhibitions ==
- Israel Gallery of Olechadas 1992 Israel
- Gallery Banská Bystrica 1997, Slovakia
- Izraeli Cultural Centre Prague 2000, The Czech Republic
- Gallery Šalgotarián 2002, Hungary
- Gallery Banská Bystrica 2004, Slovakia
- Teo Gallery 2006, Banská Bystrica, Slovakia
- Gallery Živa, SNG, Rotary Club, Zvolen 2007, Slovakia
- Prolaika Gallery 2013 – Bratislava, Slovakia
- Zichy's Palace – Gallery – Z – Bratislava, Slovakia - May 2014
- Museum SNP - Bratislava, Slovakia - 2014
- Gallery Na Tehelnej - Zvolen, Slovakia - 2015
- VD Laboratórium súčasného umenia – (Banská Bystrica – Slovensko 2022)
- Jojo Gallery – (Banská Bystrica – Slovensko 2023)
- VD Laboratórium súčasného umenia – Fotografický salón –(Banská Bystrica – Slovensko 2023)
- Gallery Bloom – (Divín – Slovensko 2024)
- Sympózium výtvarných umelcov – (Kúpele Sliač – Slovensko 2024)
- VD Laboratórium súčasného umenia – Fotografický salón –(Banská Bystrica – Slovensko 2024)
- Gallery SPP – (Bratislava – Slovensko 2025)
- VD Laboratórium súčasného umenia – "ENTROPIA" -Nina Haas & Peter W Haas - (Banská Bystrica – Slovensko 2025)

== Group exhibitions ==
- Gallery Cosmopolitan Banska Stiavnica, Slovakia - May 2015
- Vlado Oravec (sculptor) and Peter W. Haas (noble prints)
- Gallery "V podkroví", Banska Bystrica, Slovakia - December 2015 - "Winter Romance" Exhibition - artists: Fulla, Galanda, Gwerk, Hloznik, Haas, Kollar etc.

== Collections ==
- The Slovak Mining Museum, Banská Štiavnica, Slovakia
- Teo Gallery Banská Bystrica, Slovakia
- Over 1000 pieces of work belong to private collections (Slovakia, The Czech Republic, Hungary, Austria, Australia, Israel, France, London, Spain, USA, etc.)

== Film ==
- Portrait of Peter W. Haas (2015) (10-minute film about Haas by Lea Mariassy)
- Short display of Haas's artwork
- Negative retouching
- Exhibition "Metaphor" by Peter Haas
