= Jeff Weiss =

American playwright, impresario, and actor (1940–2022)

- Born: Jeffrey Weiss; April 30, 1940; Allentown, Pennsylvania, U.S.
- Died: September 18, 2022 (aged 82); Macungie, Pennsylvania, U.S.
- Occupations: Playwright; impresario; actor
- Years active: 1964–2022
- Partner: Carlos Ricardo Martinez (1982–d. 2017)
- Relatives: Jonathan Taylor Thomas (nephew)

Jeffrey Weiss (April 30, 1940 – September 18, 2022) was an American playwright, impresario, and actor, both on Broadway and a theater he ran with partner Ricardo Martinez in the East Village, Manhattan.

== Early life and education ==
Weiss grew up in Allentown, Pennsylvania, with his parents, two brothers, and one sister. His father was a salesman for Pennsylvania cement companies. His brother, Stephen Weiss, currently lives in Florida. His paternal nephew is actor Jonathan Taylor Thomas.

== Career ==
Weiss became involved in theatre, both writing and acting in plays. In New York City, his work was often presented at La MaMa Experimental Theatre Club and Caffe Cino. His first performance at La MaMa was in Robert Sealy's Waiting Boy, followed by Sealy's Prevarications, both in 1964. In 1966, Weiss performed in his own play, A Funny Walk Home, at Caffe Cino, read for the Thunderbird American Indian Dancers in Louis Mofsie's Three Mask Dances at La MaMa, and performed in Jean Reavey's Window, directed by Tom O'Horgan, also at La MaMa.

Weiss often collaborated with his partner and producer Ricardo Martinez, an artist from New Mexico. In 1966, Martinez directed Weiss in Weiss's own one-man show at La MaMa, And That's How the Rent Gets Paid.

In 1967, Weiss performed alongside Mary Boylan in H.M. Koutoukas' When Clowns Play Hamlet, which Koutoukas co-directed with O'Horgan at La MaMa. He directed and performed in a production of Jeff Laffel's There Should be Violins and The Sunday Caller at La MaMa, also in 1967. Martinez directed a production of Weiss's International Wrestling Match: An Old Testament Morality Play in Two Vengeful Acts at La MaMa in January 1969. Weiss performed in Julie Bovasso's Gloria and Esperanza at La MaMa in April 1969.

A play Weiss wrote for children, Locomotive Munch:, was produced at La MaMa in 1972. And That's How the Rent Gets Paid, Part Two, a follow-up to his 1966 show, was produced at La MaMa in April 1973, and his play Pushover was produced at La MaMa in November 1973. In 1979, he continued his work at La MaMa, directing his play Dark Twist and performing And That's How the Rent Gets Paid, Part 3, this time alongside Nicky Paraiso. In 1984, members of The Wooster Group, including Willem Dafoe, Kate Valk, and Ron Vawter, joined Weiss in And That's How the Rent Gets Paid, Part IV (or, The Confessions of Conrad Gerhardt). Later that year, he re-worked the show in Allentown with Paraiso, Dorothy Cantwell and a cast of local actors, and brought that iteration to NYC at the Wooster Group's Performing Garage. Weiss won an Obie Award for his play Hot Keys, presented during the 1991–92 season at Naked Angels. In 2012, Weiss contributed scenes, and appeared (via taped performance), in Peter Schmidt's The Teddy Bear Awards. In 2015, The Kitchen produced a revival of And That's How the Rent Gets Paid.

Weiss also enjoyed a prolific, if late-blossoming, career on the "legitimate" stage. After making his 1967 Broadway debut in Spofford, Weiss did not appear again as a professional performer until 1986, when he appeared as the Ghost/The Player King/Osric in Hamlet, opposite Kevin Kline. From that point until his retirement in 2003, Weiss was a fixture on and off-Broadway, appearing in The Front Page (with John Lithgow and Richard Thomas), Macbeth (with Glenda Jackson and Christopher Plummer), Our Town, Mastergate, The Real Inspector Hound and The Fifteen Minute Hamlet, Face Value, Carousel, The Play's the Thing, Present Laughter (with Frank Langella), Ivanov (with Kline), The Iceman Cometh (with Kevin Spacey), The Invention of Love, Mr. Peters' Connections, Flesh and Blood (with Cherry Jones), and Henry IV (with Kline, Ethan Hawke, and Audra McDonald). Weiss was also lauded for his performances in regional productions of A Midsummer Night's Dream, Coriolanus, A Christmas Carol, Harvey, Molière's The Bungler, and the world premiere of Arthur Miller's Resurrection Blues.

Weiss appeared in television episodes of Law & Order and The Equalizer, as well as in films Interstate 84, Mr. Destiny, and Vanilla Sky. He was the solo performer in the 1987 short film, Maestro, by Alex Zamm.

== Personal life and death ==
Weiss began a relationship with musician and producer, Carlos Ricardo Martinez in 1982. Martinez died in 2017.

Jeff Weiss died on September 18, 2022, in Macungie, Pennsylvania.

== Awards ==
- Obie Award for Special Citations - Joseph Cino Memorial Award: And That's How The Rent Gets Paid and A Funny Walk Home (1967)
- Guggenheim Fellowship for Creative Arts, US & Canada (1975)
- Obie Award for Playwriting: And That's How The Rent Gets Paid, Part Three (1980)
- Obie Award for Special Citations: Hot Keys (1992)
- Robert Chesley Award, to honor works by playwrights in the LGBT community (2000)
