= David Patrick Kelly =

American actor

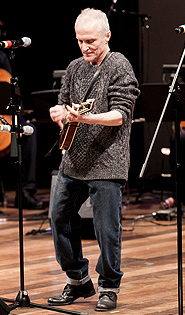
- Kelly performing in 2013
- Born: January 23, 1951 (age 75); Detroit, Michigan, U.S.
- Education: University of Detroit (BFA)
- Occupations: Actor; musician
- Years active: 1976–present
- Spouse: Juliana Francis (m. 2005)
- Children: 1
- Website: davidpatrickkelly.com

David Patrick Kelly (born January 23, 1951) is an American actor, musician and lyricist who has appeared in numerous films and television series. He is best known for his role as the main antagonist Luther in the cult film The Warriors (1979). Kelly is also known for his collaborations with Spike Lee, in the films Malcolm X (1992), Crooklyn (1994), and Chi-Raq (2015), and with David Lynch, appearing in Wild at Heart (1990) as well as Twin Peaks (1990–91) and its 2017 revival.

Kelly's other credits include roles in 48 Hrs. (1982), Commando (1985), The Crow (1994), The Funeral and Last Man Standing (both 1996), The Longest Yard (2005), as President Harry S. Truman in Flags of Our Fathers (2006), and a recurring role in The Blacklist (2015).

== Early life ==
Kelly was born in Detroit, Michigan, to Margaret Elizabeth (Murphy) Kelly (1915–2010) and Robert Corby Kelly Sr., an accountant. His father received a Bronze Star Medal for service during the Battle of the Bulge in World War II. His maternal grandfather, Daniel Murphy, was from Lisnashearshane, Duhallow, County Cork, Ireland. His great-granduncle was Father William Corby, chaplain of the Irish Brigade at the Battle of Gettysburg. Father Corby eventually became president of the University of Notre Dame.

Kelly was given a mandolin on Saint Patrick's Day 1964 by his mother and considers that to have been the greatest influence on his artistic life.

As an undergraduate student, Kelly wrote the lyrics and music for four musicals produced in Detroit. These four productions were Lysistrata (by Aristophanes), The World from My Window (based on a book of children's poems), a project based on Gulliver's Travels (in the land of horses) and Home for Silent Clowns, a mime show with songs.

Kelly graduated cum laude with a Bachelor of Fine Arts from the University of Detroit, and was a student of Marcel Marceau and Mira Rostova.

== Career ==
=== Film ===
In his debut role of Luther in Walter Hill's 1979 cult film The Warriors, Kelly's character was the psychotic leader who shot Cyrus (Roger Hill) and screeches the famous line, "Warriors... come out to play-ee-ay!" which was not in the script and which he improvised in collaboration with Walter Hill who asked him to come up with something. For the 1982 film 48 Hrs., starring Nick Nolte and Eddie Murphy, Hill rewrote a role for Kelly and again named the character "Luther".

Kelly's film credits include Commando (as Sully), The Crow, Crooklyn, Hammett, Dreamscape, The Adventures of Ford Fairlane, Last Man Standing, Songcatcher, K-PAX, The Longest Yard, Flags of Our Fathers, John Wick (reprising his role as Charlie in John Wick: Chapter 2), and Chi-Raq. Kelly played Dropshadow in David Lynch's film Wild at Heart, which won the Palme d'Or at Cannes in 1990. He appeared in the 1996 video game Ripper.

=== Television ===
Kelly's television guest appearances include Twin Peaks, Miami Vice, Moonlighting, Spenser: For Hire, Ghostwriter, Third Watch, Hack, Kidnapped, Law & Order, Law & Order: Criminal Intent, Law & Order: Special Victims Unit, Gossip Girl, Louie, Blue Bloods, The Blacklist, Feed the Beast, and Only Murders in the Building.

=== Stage ===
He performed in a few off-off-Broadway theater productions during the 1970s and 1980s. These included Wilford Leach's C.O.R.F.A.X. (Don't Ask), produced at La MaMa Experimental Theatre Club in 1975, and Ireneusz Iredyński's An Altar to Himself, as adapted by Michal Kobialka and Liz Diamond and directed by Virlana Tkacz at La MaMa in 1989. He also appeared in the April 1974 production of Mr. Jello, written and directed by George Birimisa, and then performed a song for which he wrote the music from Mr. Jello, at a benefit hosted by La MaMa to honor H.M. Koutoukas, called "For the Benefit of Harry", also in 1974. In 1976, he performed in La MaMa's "Cracker Club Country Fair Gala" in segments from Paul Foster's Silver Queen and Leonard Melfi's Horse Opera.

In 1998, Kelly played the role of Feste in the Lincoln Center production of Twelfth Night directed by Nicholas Hytner. Kelly originated the role of Da in Once on Broadway, which was awarded the 2012 Tony Award for Best Musical. Kelly sang and played mandolin on the Grammy Award-winning soundtrack for Once.

Kelly has frequently appeared at the Hartford Stage Company in Hartford, Connecticut, starring in the title roles in Georg Büchner's Woyzeck and Molière's Tartuffe. He played Iago in Othello and Hoss in Sam Shepard's Tooth Of Crime. At the American Repertory Theater in Cambridge, Massachusetts, he played the title role in Luigi Pirandello's Enrico IV and starred in an adaption of the Yuan dynasty classic Snow in June.

He has appeared in four plays by avant-garde playwright Richard Foreman: Pearls for Pigs, The Mind King, Film Is Evil/Radio Is Good, and The Cure. In 2015, he appeared as Michaud, alongside Keira Knightley, in the Roundabout Theatre Company's production of Helen Edmundson's adaptation of Thérèse Raquin in the Studio 54 space.

In 2022, Kelly played the Narrator and the Mysterious Man in Stephen Sondheim's Into the Woods at Encores! and later at the St. James Theatre on Broadway and on the 2023 national tour.

In 2024, Kelly played King Sextimus the Silent in Once Upon a Mattress at Encores!

Kelly played Morten Kiil in Amy Herzog's new adaptation of An Enemy of the People at Circle in the Square Theatre on Broadway, directed by Sam Gold.

=== Music ===
As a composer and musician, Kelly participated in New York's rock and cabaret scene, playing such venues as Max's Kansas City, Reno Sweeney's, CBGB, and The Lower Manhattan Ocean Club. He wrote the music for the titular song of George Birimisa's Mr. Jello, which was produced at La MaMa in 1974.

In May 2008, he released an album of his original music titled David Patrick Kelly: Rip Van Boy Man, which contained new songs and live recordings from his club days in 1975.

In 2024 he had a cameo as a cop on Warriors, a concept album by Lin-Manuel Miranda and Eisa Davis based on the 1979 movie The Warriors, in which he starred.

== Awards ==
Kelly received a Connecticut Critics Circle Award for his performance in Tartuffe at Hartford Stage, and was nominated for a Lucille Lortel Award for his performance in Nathan Louis Jackson's When I Come To Die at LCT3 in Manhattan. In 1998, Kelly received an Obie Award for sustained excellence for his theater work in classics, new plays, and the avant-garde.

== Personal life ==
Kelly married theater actress and writer Juliana Francis at St. Mark's Church in-the-Bowery in Manhattan on August 14, 2005. Their daughter Margarethe Jane Kelly was born in 2008.

Kelly has practiced the martial art seido (karate) and three forms of tai chi for more than 35 years; he is a second-degree black belt in seido.

== Acting credits ==
=== Film ===
Year	Title	Role	Notes
1979	The Warriors	Luther	
1982	Hammett	The Punk	
1982	48 Hrs.	Luther Kelly	
1984	Dreamscape	Tommy Ray Glatman	
1985	Commando	Sully	
1987	The Misfit Brigade	The Legionnaire	
1988	Cheap Shots	Arnold Posner	
1989	Penn & Teller Get Killed	The Fan	
1990	Wild at Heart	Dropshadow	
1990	The Adventures of Ford Fairlane	Sam	
1992	Malcolm X	Mr. Ostrowski	
1993	Exterior Night	Biff	short film
1994	Crooklyn	Tony 'Tony Eyes' / Jim	
1994	The Crow	T-Bird	
1995	Heavy	Grey Man In The Hospital	
1995	Cafe Society	J. Roland Sala	
1996	Flirting with Disaster	Fritz Boudreau	
1996	The Funeral	Michael Stein	
1996	Last Man Standing	Doyle	
1997	Trojan War	Bagman	
1999	In Too Deep	Rick Scott	
2000	Songcatcher	Earl Giddens	
2001	K-PAX	Howie	
2002	Personal Velocity: Three Portraits	Peter	
2003	Justice	Marty	
2005	The Longest Yard	Unger	
2006	Flags of Our Fathers	President Harry S. Truman	
2007	Gardener of Eden	Pa Harris	
2014	John Wick	Charlie, The Cleaner	
2015	Chi-Raq	General King Kong	
2016	To Keep the Light	Brackett	
2017	John Wick: Chapter 2	Charlie, The Cleaner	
2018	O.G.	Larry	
2019	VFW	Doug McCarthy	
2020	The Return of Tragedy	John Katebush	short film
2022	Asking for It	Morrill	

=== Television ===
Year	Title	Role	Notes
1979	Sanctuary of Fear	Audience Member	Television film
1982	American Playhouse	Copyboy	Episode: "Working"
1984	Tales from the Darkside	Richard Hall	Episode: "Slippage"
1985	Miami Vice	Jerry	Episode: "The Home Invaders"
1985	Moonlighting	McBride	Episode: "Somewhere Under the Rainbow"
1985	Our Family Honor	Terry Jurow	Episode: "The Casino"
1987	Spenser: For Hire	Kevin Harley / Ned Lloyd	2 episodes
1988	ABC Afterschool Special	Unknown	Episode: "Date Rape"
1989	CBS Summer Playhouse	Langley	Episode: "B-Men"
1990–1991	Twin Peaks	Jerry Horne	9 episodes
1993	Ghostwriter	'Double-T'	5 episodes
1998	Mad About You	Cabbie With Chicken	Episode: "Season Opener"
2002	Hack	Eddie O'Daniel	Episode: "Favors"
2005	Third Watch	Danny McGowan	Episode: "Forever Blue"
2007	Kidnapped	Kurso	Episode: "Acknowledgement"
2008	Law & Order	Josh Perlberg	Episode: "Political Animal"
2008	Law & Order: Criminal Intent	Bo Levy	Episode: "Reunion"
2008–2011	Gossip Girl	Noah Shapiro	3 episodes
2010	Louie	Therapist	2 episodes
2010	Madso's War	Danny Driscoll	Television film
2011	Law & Order: Special Victims Unit	Orville Underwood	Episode: "Possessed"
2011	Bored to Death	Jerry	Episode: "Nothing I Can't Handle by Running Away"
2015	Blue Bloods	Donald Berry	Episode: "Bad Company"
2015	The Blacklist	Heinrich Gerst	4 episodes
2016	Feed the Beast	Ziggy Woichik	8 episodes
2017	Twin Peaks	Jerry Horne	7 episodes
2018–2023	Succession	Paul Chambers	2 episodes
2022	Ray Donovan: The Movie	Matty Galloway	Television film
2025-	Only Murders in the Building	Miller the Trash Guy	3 episodes
2025	Sheriff Country	Mitchell	1 episode

=== Video games ===
Year	Title	Role	Notes
1996	Ripper	Joey Falconetti	Interactive movie

=== Theatre ===
Year	Title	Role	Venue	Notes
1970	Hair	Claude	Vest Pocket Theatre	Regional
1975	The Rocky Horror Show	u/s Eddie u/s Dr. Scott	Belasco Theatre	Broadway
1977	Hair	Claude	Biltmore Theater	Broadway
1978	Working	Brett Meyer / Benny Blue / Charlie Blossom	46th Street Theater	Broadway
1980	The Suicide	Pervy	ANTA Playhouse	Broadway
1982	Is There Life After High School?	Performer	Ethel Barrymore Theatre	Broadway
1994	The Government Inspector	Osip	Lyceum Theatre	Broadway
1995	Henry VI	Lord Talbot / Jack Cade	Theater at St. Clement's Church	Off-Broadway
1998	Anadarko	Ray	MCC Theater	Off-Broadway
1998	Twelfth Night	Feste	Vivian Beaumont Theater	Broadway
2000	Uncle Vanya	Ilya Ilyich Telegin	Brooks Atkinson Theatre	Broadway
2006	Festen	Poul	Music Box Theatre	Broadway
2011	When I Come to Die	James (Roach) Teagle	The Duke on 42nd Street	Off-Broadway
2011	Once	Da	New York Theatre Workshop	Off-Broadway
2012	Once	Da	Bernard B. Jacobs Theatre	Broadway
2015	Thérèse Raquin	Superintendent Michaud	Studio 54	Broadway
2015	Alice by Heart	King of Hearts / Dr Butridge / Jabberwocky / Duck / Mock Turtle	MCC Theater	Workshop
2018	Miss You Like Hell	Higgins	The Public Theater	Off-Broadway
2022	Into the Woods	The Narrator / The Mysterious Man	New York City Center	Off-Broadway
2022–23	Into the Woods	The Narrator / The Mysterious Man	St. James Theatre	Broadway
2023	Into the Woods	The Narrator / The Mysterious Man	U.S. National Tour	Ten city engagement
2024	Once Upon a Mattress	King Sextimus the Silent	New York City Center	Off-Broadway
2024	An Enemy of the People	Morten Kiil	Circle in the Square Theatre	Broadway
2024	Once Upon a Mattress	King Sextimus the Silent	Hudson Theatre	Broadway
2024–2025	Once Upon a Mattress	King Sextimus the Silent	Ahmanson Theatre	Los Angeles
