= Caffe Cino =

Theater in New York City (closed 1968)

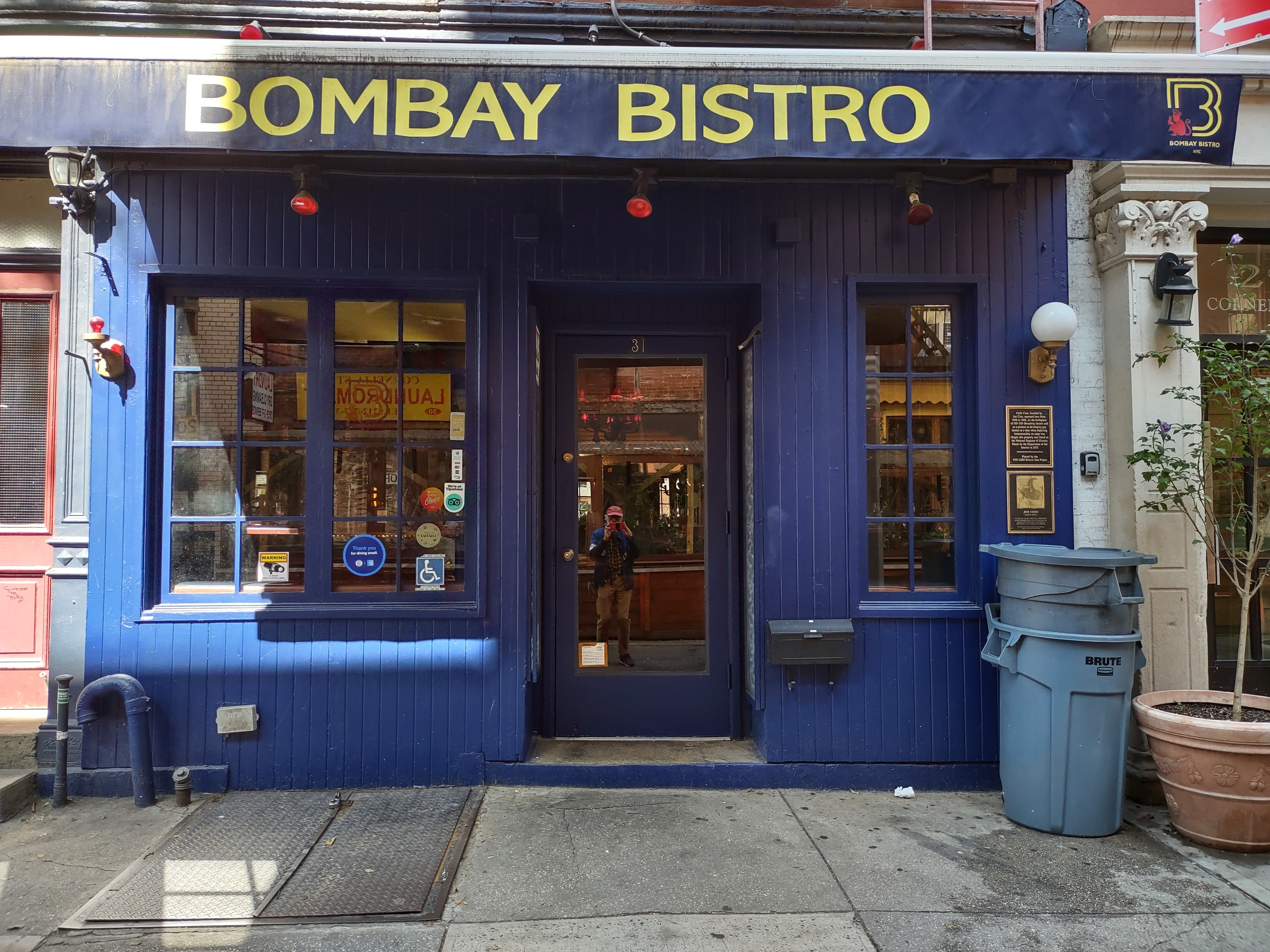
- Interactive map of Caffe Cino
- Address: 31 Cornelia St. New York City; United States
- Coordinates: 40°43′52.6″N 74°00′10.5″W
- Operator: Joe Cino
- Type: Off-Broadway theatre

Construction
- Opened: 1958
- Closed: 1968

Website
- caffecino.wordpress.com
- Caffe Cino
- U.S. National Register of Historic Places
- U.S. Historic district – Contributing property
- New York State Register of Historic Places
- New York City Landmark
- Location within Manhattan Location within New York City Location within New York Location within the United States
- Location: 31 Cornelia St., New York, New York
- Coordinates: 40°43′53″N 74°00′09″W
- Area: 0.03 acres (0.012 ha)
- Part of: South Village Historic District (ID14000026)
- NRHP reference No.: 100001802
- NYSRHP No.: 06101.019267
- NYCL No.: 2635

Significant dates
- Added to NRHP: 2017-11-09
- Designated NYSRHP: 2017-09-20
- Designated NYCL: 2019-06-18

Caffe Cino was an Off-Off-Broadway theater founded in 1958 by Joe Cino. The West Village coffeehouse, located at 31 Cornelia Street, was initially conceived as a venue for poetry, folk music, and visual art exhibitions. The plays produced at the Cino, however, became most prominent, and it is now considered the "birthplace of Off-Off-Broadway".

The building was added to the National Register of Historic Places on November 9, 2017. It was made a New York City designated landmark in 2019.

== Beginnings and early productions ==
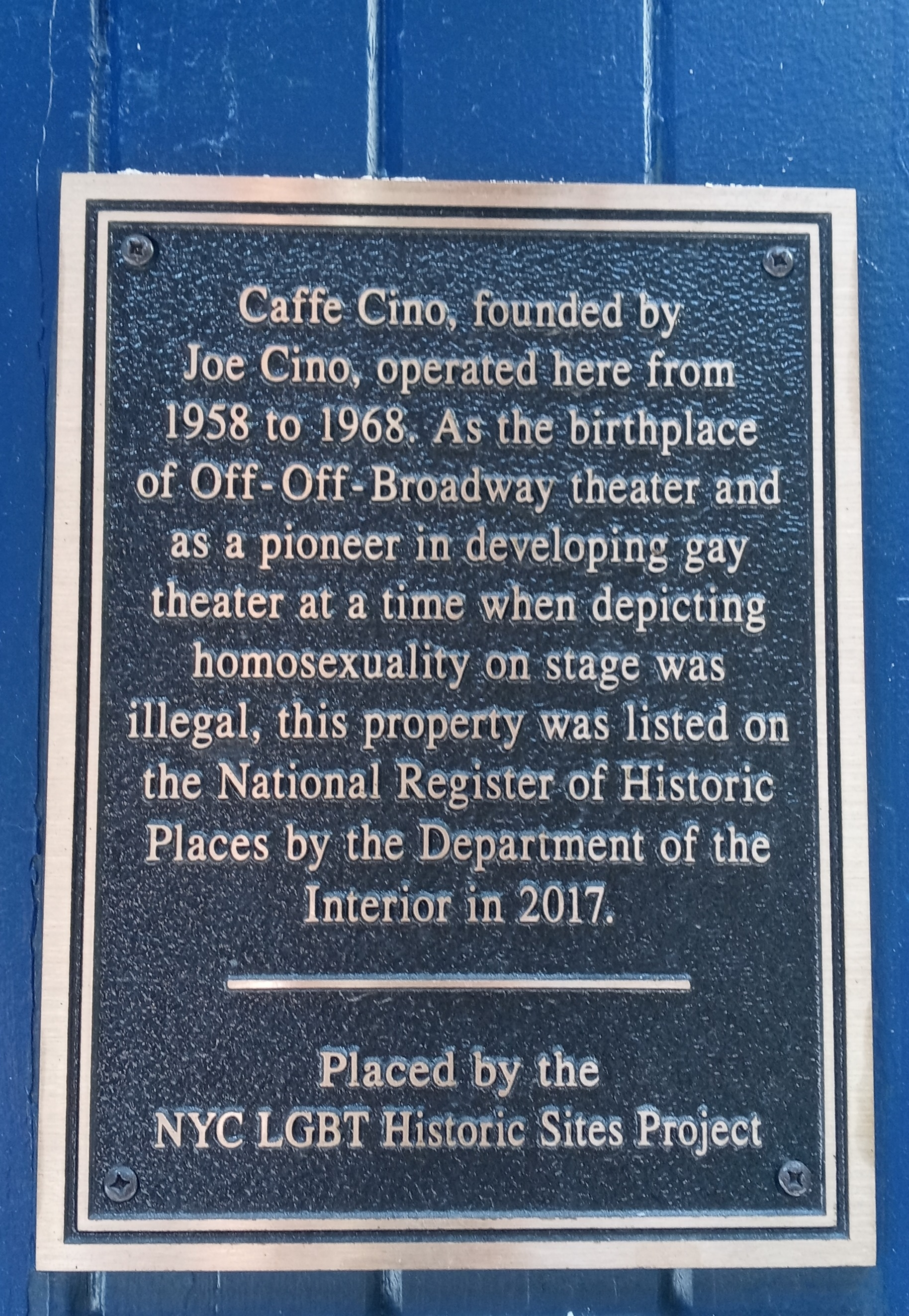
A plaque indicating that Caffe Cino was listed on the National Register of Historic Places in 2017

Joe Cino was born into an Italian-American family, and moved from Buffalo, New York to be a dancer in New York City. After 10 years, he used his $400 in savings and opened the Caffe Cino Art Gallery. Initially, Cino encouraged his friends to hang their artwork on the walls. That led to poetry readings, which led to staged readings and eventually to productions of plays.

During the early days of the Cino, plays were produced on the floor. A makeshift 8x8-foot stage was later created using milk cartons and carpet remnants. Productions were initially limited to 30 minutes, and the audience could stand anywhere. The space was only 18x30-feet, and audience members often perched atop the cigarette machine. Admission was one dollar, and audience members were offered a coffee and an Italian pastry along with the show.

== Fire and Cino's death ==
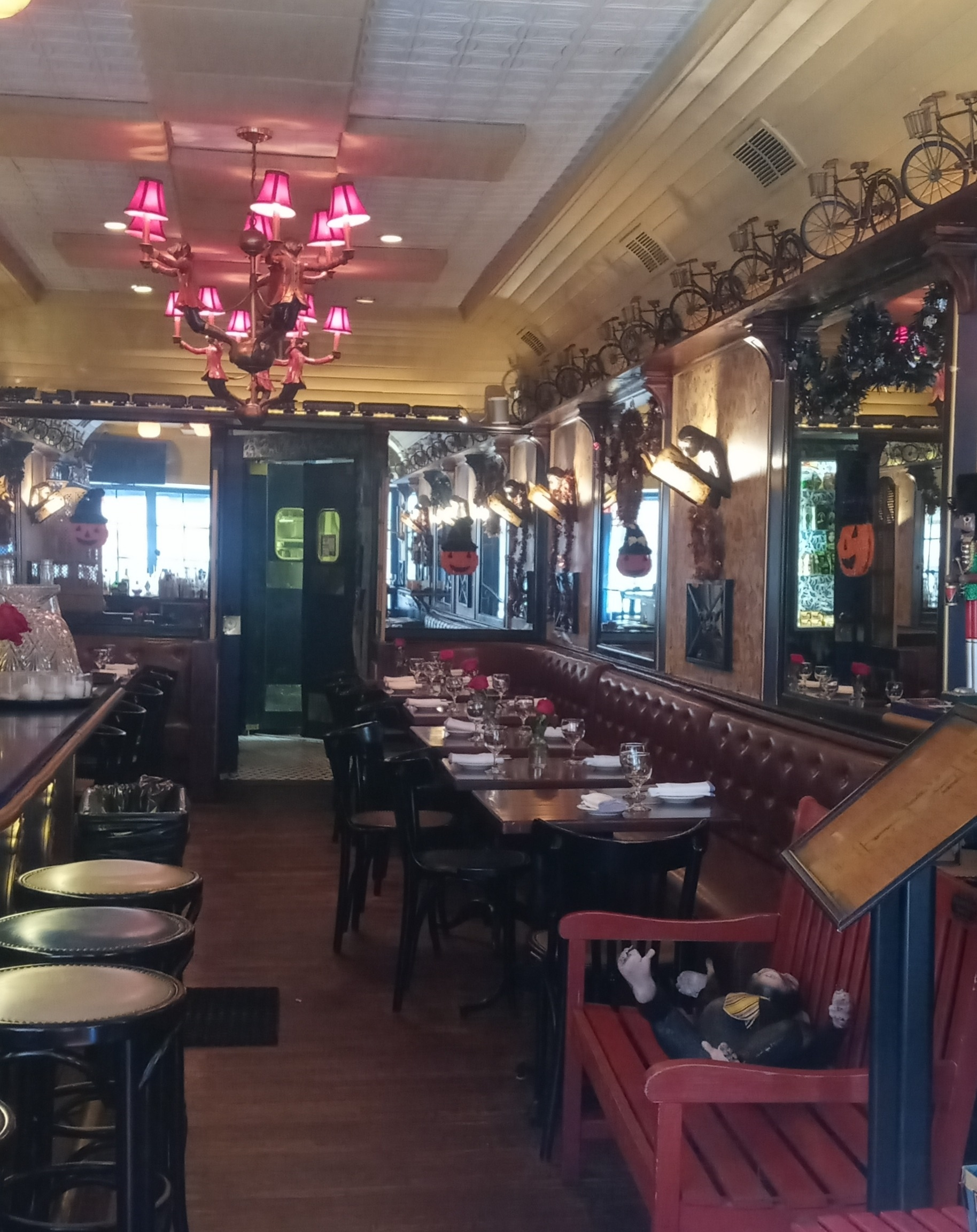
Interior of Bombay Bistro, formerly Cafe Cino

On Ash Wednesday, March 3, 1965, a fire destroyed the interior of the Cino. The building's structure was not affected. A new lighting system had been installed, along with the fireproofing of the Caffe's ceiling, which prevented the fire from spreading to the rest of the tenement building. The official cause of the fire was a gas leak, but some suspected that Cino's lover set the fire. The community raised money by staging benefit performances while the Caffe was closed for renovations. Ellen Stewart, founder of La MaMa Experimental Theatre Club, offered Cino and his staff a space to continue Caffe Cino productions on Sunday and Monday nights at her theater.

Joe Cino died three days after repeatedly stabbing himself in 1967.

== Notable contributors ==
The Caffe Cino was an incubator for first-time directors, playwrights, actors, and lighting or set designers. Many continued to work in stage, screen, or both after the Cino closed. Notable contributors include:

- John Guare
- Sam Shepard
- Al Pacino
- Robert Dahdah
- Bernadette Peters
- Robert Heide
- Bette Midler
- Johnny Dodd
- Doric Wilson
- Jean-Claude van Itallie
- Rosalyn Drexler
- Marshall W. Mason
- Tom O'Horgan
- Charles Kerbs
- Magie Dominic
- Irene Fornes
- William Hoffman
- Tom Eyen
- Paul Foster
- Leonard Melfi
- Ondine
- H.M. Koutoukas
- David Starkweather
- Michael Warren Powell
- Mari-Claire Charba
- Robert Patrick
- Lanford Wilson
- Andy Milligan (playwright)
