= Magie Dominic =

Canadian poet, author, and artist

Magie Dominic (born 1944) is a Canadian poet, author, and artist who was born in Corner Brook, Newfoundland.

Her first memoir, The Queen of Peace Room, from Wilfrid Laurier University Press was shortlisted for the Canadian Women's Studies Award, ForeWord magazine's Book of the Year Award, and the Judy Grahn Award. Occurring over a week-long retreat at an isolated retreat house, The Queen of Peace Room is an exploration of memory and of violence against women and children. A second memoir, Street Angel, received the Silver Medal from Independent Publishers Awards and was short listed for Book of the Year/memoir by Foreword Magazine. Street Angel is set in Newfoundland in the 1950s, but ranges over a 70-year period involving the same protagonist and her family.

== Life ==
After growing up in Newfoundland, Magie Dominic moved to the United States, where she studied at The Art Institute of Pittsburgh, New School University, Franklin Furnace, and Open Theatre.

She was involved in the Off-Off-Broadway theatre movement in New York City at Joe Cino's Caffe Cino, where she performed and directed. She curated Caffe Cino - History of Off-Off Broadway at Lincoln Centre in 1985. She donated papers, photographs and Caffé Cino memorabilia to the Library for the Performing Arts at Lincoln Center in 2011, establishing The Magie Dominic Caffé Cino Archives.

Dominic was also involved with La MaMa Experimental Theatre Club during the late 1960s, performing in and stage managing multiple productions. Performance credits include Saul Paul Sirag's There's The Wrong Number Of Teeth (1966), Charles L. Mee Jr.'s God Bless Us, Everyone (1967), and a Tom O'Horgan directed production of Changes (1968). She stage managed plays such as Tom Eyen's Miss Nefertiti Regrets (1966), as well as directed lighting and performed other technical work for various productions.

Dominic also had a solo exhibition at La MaMa Galleria, December 10–20, 1998, titled "Stations of the Cross/Female Face of Christ".

== Other works ==
Dominic is a past contributor to The Village Voice, The Globe and Mail, and commondreams.org.

Her work has been featured in numerous anthologies, including Outrage (1994), Belles Lettres/Beautiful Letters (1994), Pushing the Limits (1996), and Countering the Myths (1996).

== Bibliography ==
- Dominic, Magie (2002). The Queen of Peace room ([Online-Ausg.] ed.). Waterloo, Ont.: Wilfrid Laurier University Press. ISBN 0-88920-417-9.
- Dominic, Magie (2014). Street angel. Waterloo, Ont.: Wilfrid Laurier Univ Press. ISBN 978-1-77112-026-5.
- Dominic, Magie; Smith, Michael, eds. (2010). H.M. Koutoukas, 1937-2010, remembered by his friends. Silverton, Or.: Fast Books. ISBN 978-0979473661.

== See also ==
- List of Canadian poets
- List of people of Newfoundland and Labrador
- List of Canadian writers
