= La MaMa Experimental Theatre Club =

Theater in Manhattan, New York

- Formation: 1961
- Founder: Ellen Stewart
- Type: Off-Off-Broadway theatre
- Artistic director: Mia Yoo
- Website: lamama.org
La MaMa Experimental Theatre Club
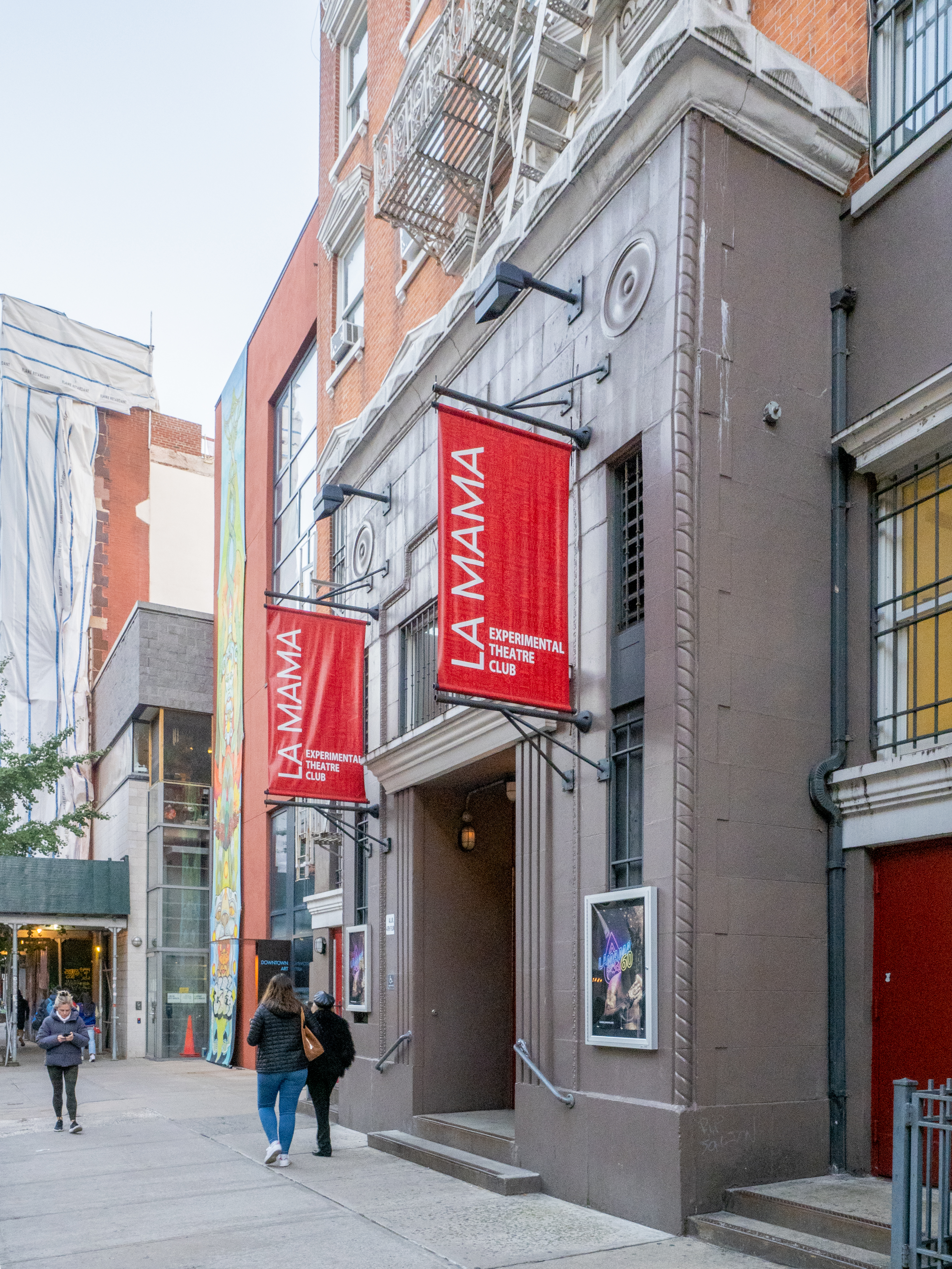
- Facade of the building of La MaMa Experimental Theatre Club in New York
- Interactive map of La MaMa Experimental Theatre Club
- Former names: Aschenbroedel Verein Building; Gesangverein Schillerbund Building
- Address: 74 East Fourth Street; New York City; United States
- Coordinates: 40.726613°N 73.990105°W
- Capacity: Ellen Stewart Theatre: 299; The Downstairs: 150; The Community Arts Space: 74; The Club: 118
- Designation: New York City Landmark
Construction
- Opened: 1873
- Reopened: 1969

La MaMa Experimental Theatre Club (sometimes abbreviated as La MaMa E.T.C.) is an Off-Off-Broadway theater founded in 1961 by African-American theatre director, producer, and fashion designer Ellen Stewart. Located in the East Village neighborhood of Manhattan in New York City, the theater began in the basement boutique where Stewart sold her fashion designs. Stewart turned the space into a theater at night, focusing on the work of young playwrights.

== Background ==
Stewart started La MaMa as a theatre dedicated to the playwright and primarily producing new plays, including works by Paul Foster, Jean-Claude van Itallie, Lanford Wilson, Sam Shepard, Adrienne Kennedy, Harvey Fierstein, and Rochelle Owens. La MaMa also became an international ambassador for Off-Off-Broadway theatre by touring downtown theatre abroad during the 1960s.

La MaMa is the only theatre of the 1960s Off-Off-Broadway movement's four core theatres that continues to thrive today. The other three Off-Off-Broadway theatres that composed this core included Joe Cino's Caffe Cino, Al Carmines' Judson Poets Theatre, and Ralph Cook's Theatre Genesis. More than any other Off-Off-Broadway producer, Stewart reached out beyond the East Village, impelling rather than following new trends in theatre and performance.

To the present, La MaMa's mission is dedicated to "the people who make art, and it is to them that we give our support with free theatre and rehearsal space, lights, sound, props, platforms, and whatever else we have that they can use to create their work. We want them to feel free to explore their ideas, and translate them into a theatrical language that can communicate to any person in any part of the world."

== History ==
=== Beginnings: Ellen Stewart and the pushcart ===
Ellen Stewart is the spirit of La MaMa; she is its guardian, janitor, fundraiser, press agent, tour manager, conceptual leader—she is the guts of the place. To understand this theatre one must first know Ellen Stewart.

Stewart worked as a fashion designer at Saks Fifth Avenue before starting the theatre. Stewart was inspired by her mentor, "Papa Abraham Diamonds", who owned a fabric shop on the Lower East Side. Diamonds told Stewart that everyone needs both a "pushcart to serve others" and their own personal pushcart. Stewart had a revelation about this advice during a trip she took to Morocco and decided to open a boutique for her fashion designs that would also serve as a theatre for her foster brother, playwright Fred Lights, and his fellow playwright Paul Foster. On October 18, 1961, Stewart paid the fifty-five dollar rent on a tenement basement at 321 East Ninth Street to start her boutique and theater.

=== As an Off-Off-Broadway theatre ===
==== A theatre for the playwright ====
As opposed to Caffe Cino, which was focused on creating a specific atmosphere or clientele, La MaMa's primary focus was on the playwright. Stewart was interested in the people behind the work, and often never even read the plays. She relied on feelings she got when meeting people and deciding whether or not to produce work with them.

In the early years, Stewart housed and fed playwrights and directors whenever possible. She acted as a mother; Jean-Claude van Itallie said "we were her baby playwrights and she sat on us like eggs that would hatch. She told us that what we were doing mattered." In a 1997 interview, Stewart said of the playwrights in her group: "I call them my kids."

In 1963, Stewart created a policy of exclusively presenting new plays, producing a new play each week. She also began ringing a bell before each production, welcoming the audience with, "Welcome to La MaMa dedicated to the playwright and all aspects of the theatre. Tonight we present ..."

==== La MaMa and Caffe Cino ====
Stewart did not believe that her theater was an imitation of Cino's. Cino and Stewart had a close relationship, and the first documented production at La MaMa, (One Arm, July 27, 1962, an adaptation of a Tennessee Williams story, transferred from Caffe Cino. Perhaps the best way to understand Cino and Stewart's relationship is to consider their different models of producing plays. Cino rarely extended a run, as he didn't want to affect the next play's opening. If playwrights wanted longer runs and more exposure for a popular play, they went to La MaMa. There was an unspoken agreement between Cino and Stewart that the plays produced at either theatre could continue to a second run at the other. When Caffe Cino burned down in 1966, La MaMa hosted benefit shows to aid in the theatre's reopening. Joe Cino's family offered Stewart the theatre after his death in 1967, but she declined.

=== Early years ===
==== 321 E. 9th Street: Café La MaMa ====
La MaMa's first home, the basement at 321 East Ninth Street, was renovated over a period of nine months. During this time, the neighbors became concerned about the different men visiting at various times to work on the space. Moreover, as an African-American woman, Stewart was not welcomed into the neighborhood. Some accused her of running a bordello. The health department was contacted, but the inspector who arrived happened to be an old vaudevillian. He advised Stewart that getting a license to open a coffeehouse was much easier than getting a license to open a theatre. Following this advice, La MaMa became Café La MaMa. Coffee and cake were served, admission was free, and actors received some minor compensation from "passing the hat". Stewart's fashion designs and seamstress jobs subsidized the theatre during its first decade of operation.

The first space was twenty by thirty feet with red walls. The café sat twenty-five people and the dirt floor was planked with orange crates. There was one set piece: a bed. Stewart's initial intention of using the space as a boutique during the daytime quickly disappeared. As Stewart said, "Once our theatre got started, I didn't have the discipline to sew. I was too busy doing other things – not writing or directing – but just doing theatre." The plays ran for one week, from Wednesday to Saturday.

Even operating as a "café," Café La MaMa was forced to close and reopen ten times during its first year. Although the neighbors' fears concerning Stewart's supposed brothel had been quelled, fire inspectors often found violations at the theatre, which created serious legal problems. Stewart herself was arrested several times, sometimes under an alias. Issues with fire-code violations at Café La MaMa's first basement location led Stewart to search for a new space. In 1963, the Café was closed by the Buildings Department due to a zoning violation.

==== 82 2nd Avenue: La MaMa Experimental Theatre Club ====
Café La MaMa moved into its second home, a loft above a florist shop at 82 Second Avenue, on June 28, 1963. One month after opening, Stewart was informed by the Buildings Department that she had to vacate this new space because she was making a profit from serving coffee. Stewart stopped serving coffee and began charging an admission of fifty cents.

On March 12, 1964, Café La MaMa was officially renamed La MaMa Experimental Theatre Club (La MaMa E.T.C). The "passing of the hat" ended with this transition from café to a members-only club. Even operating as a club, this space was often visited by civic authorities, frequently interrupting performances.

This second space was approximately five times larger than the first space and sat up to seventy-four people. The ceilings were twenty by fifty feet high and there was a one-step stage that was twenty by eight feet. 82 Second Avenue is where La MaMa E.T.C. truly became a theater. During this time, playwrights Lanford Wilson and Sam Shepard began producing plays at La MaMa. This was also where Stewart started her tradition of sitting outside on La MaMa's steps during performances to ensure that civic authorities didn't interrupt.

Because of building code violations, La MaMa was forced to relocate again in November 1964. All of these relocations were initiated by the Buildings Department inspector, who would contact the Fire Department, who would then contact the Police Department to issue a summons for Stewart's arrest. In order to avoid a third conviction, which would have made her a felon, Stewart moved La MaMa to a new space with the audience's help. Stewart recalled:

It was the closing performance of Balls, Paul Foster's play. There must have been 35 people who came to see the play. Many of them had never been there before, I told them just to strike the café. Many didn't know what I meant, but they all saw the others picking up chairs and tables. Everybody picked something up and followed me down the street. We took everything, paintings, tables, chairs, coffeepots—everything. Well, they moved me in one hour.

The audience followed Stewart to the second floor of 122 Second Avenue, La MaMa's third home.

==== 122 2nd Avenue ====
On November 11, 1964, La MaMa E.T.C. opened at 122 Second Avenue with David Novak's The Wedding Panda. This space was twenty-three by seventy-five feet with a twelve-foot ceiling; the stage at the back was twenty-three by ten feet. The seating capacity was technically seventy-four, but the theatre would often fit 115 people at a time. This new, larger space attracted artists who had previously worked at other tiny Off-Off-Broadway venues but were ready for a larger space. Lanford Wilson's Balm in Gilead, which needed a stage that could accommodate twenty-five people, and was also the first full-length play written for off-off Broadway, opened at 122 Second Avenue in January 1965.

Partially due to previous legal struggles, the performances at 122 Second Avenue were primarily publicized by word of mouth. The theatre had no sign; the street-level door was labeled "122 Delivery Entrance". There were weekly listings of the productions in the Village Voice, but an address or a phone number was never listed. Only members could attend, and one had to visit 122 2nd Avenue in person to become a member. By 1967, La MaMa E.T.C. had an estimated three thousand members. La MaMa E.T.C. officially became a nonprofit organization in 1967.

La MaMa remained at this third location until 1967. This period was crucial to La MaMa's establishment and audience development. La MaMa moved for a final time when the lease on 122 2nd Avenue expired in April 1968.

==== 74A East 4th Street ====
The second floor at St. Mark's Place served as a transitional space for La MaMa from January through March 1969. On April 2, 1969, Stewart purchased the building at 74A East 4th Street using grant money from the Ford, Rockefeller, and Doris Duke Foundations.

The ground floor of 74A E. 4th is a theatre which seats one hundred people. Originally called the La Mama Repertory Theatre, the theatre is now called the First Floor Theatre. The second-floor space is a cabaret called the La MaMa Experimental Club with the capacity to seat seventy-five. With additional funding, the third floor became a rehearsal space and workshop. Finally, the top floor was turned into an apartment for Stewart. In 1970, a decaying seven-story loft building at 47 Great Jones Street was purchased for additional rehearsal space, using money from the Ford Foundation. Between 2018 and 2023, the 74A E 4th Street location underwent a renovation that "expanded the lobby and public spaces, adding a multipurpose space on the third floor and more bathrooms." Dressing rooms are also expanded, bringing the building "up to the current ADA accessibility requirements while preserving its original facades and historic essence."

==== 236 East 3rd Street ====
In June 1971, La MaMa acquired 236 East 3rd and other abandoned buildings on the Lower East Side to turn them into art spaces. No. 236 was used primarily for community workshops, in an effort to engage and produce art that was reflective and representative of the surrounding neighborhood. The children's workshops spearheaded by avant-garde jazz drummer Charles “Bobo” Shaw, were some of the most ambitious.

Throughout the 1970s, La MaMa's 236 E. 3rd location became a centerpiece of the Loft Jazz movement with dozens of renowned and budding musicians traversing this space to gather and rehearse. The hallmark of this period was when, in 1979, trumpeter Lester Bowie rehearsed his Sho'Nuff Orchestra in preparing for a onetime performance of a 59-member contemporary jazz collective, a gathering reflective of the “Great Day in Harlem” photoshoot.

Of great help during this period was the Comprehensive Employment and Training Act. In 1978, Stewart utilized CETA funds to mount Goethe’s Faust I, directed by Fritz Bennewitz. CETA enabled the hiring of 22 actors, an 8-person chorus, 6 musicians, dancers and an 18-member crew. CETA also funded a series of Chamber Concerts, as well as the La MaMa-Ceta Jazz Cabaret.

==== 66 East 4th Street ====
In 1974, La MaMa purchased 66 E. 4th Street, which is two doors down from 74A E. 4th. Initially referred to as the Annex, 66 E. 4th includes a flexible theatre space with a seating capacity of 299 as well as an upper floor dormitory for visiting artists. This space had previously served as a forty-eight by one hundred feet television soundstage with thirty-foot high ceilings.

In November 2009, the Annex was renamed the Ellen Stewart Theatre.

=== In the 2000s ===
In 2005, the theatre was among 406 New York City arts and social service institutions to receive part of a $20 million grant from the Carnegie Corporation, made possible by a donation from then-mayor of New York City, Michael Bloomberg.

Today, over one hundred productions with over four hundred performances are staged at La MaMa each season. Stewart continued to be artistic director and "mother" at La MaMa until her death on January 13, 2011. The choice of who would follow Stewart was significant, as "Ellen is La MaMa" to many people. Before her death, Stewart chose to be succeeded by Mia Yoo, who continues to serve as artistic director.

== Impact ==
To date, La MaMa has presented and produced work by artists from over seventy nations.

=== Early European tours ===
While frequently moving locations in Manhattan, La MaMa was also traveling internationally. Stewart wanted broad publicity for her playwrights but she wasn't finding this in the United States, due partially to La MaMa's "hit or miss quality" and partially to the short runs of productions. Critics also found it difficult to determine the "dedicated devotion to novelty" of La MaMa productions. Upon hearing that Danish and other European countries would review most productions seen in their cities, Stewart decided to establish a reputation in Europe so that the United States would take more notice. In the fall of 1965, with twenty-two plays and sixteen young actors, La MaMa had its first European tour.

La MaMa had two traveling companies. The first company, headed by Tom O'Horgan, went to Copenhagen for six weeks and was well-received. The Danish audience was interested in the company's passion and energy, and La MaMa was invited back the following year. The other company, led by Ross Alexander, went to Paris for six weeks. Unfortunately, the French audience found Jean-Claude van Itallie's America Hurrah obscene and the reviews were negative. Still, this first tour achieved its goal; La MaMa returned to New York with several positive Danish reviews. La MaMa had its second European tour from September–December 1966, again with O'Horgan and with ten actors. A third European tour took place from June–November 1967.

=== Cultural ambassador ===
The La MaMa companies did not only bring La MaMa plays to Europe but also brought plays that were first presented at other Off-Off-Broadway venues. These included Home Free!, The Madness of Lady Bright, and Miss. Victoria from Caffe Cino, as well as Birdbath and Chicago from Theatre Genesis. Thus, La MaMa acted as "international ambassadors, not just for La MaMa, but for new Village playwriting generally."

La MaMa has opened satellite La MaMa theatres in Boston, Amsterdam, Bogotá, Israel, London, Melbourne, Morocco, Munich, Paris, Tokyo, Toronto, and Vienna. As of 2006, only a few continued to carry the La MaMa name, including La MaMa Bogotá, La MaMa Tel Aviv, and La MaMa Melbourne.

These tours and satellite theatres not only created international connections and established La MaMa as a cultural ambassador for Off-Off-Broadway theatre, but also introduced experimental playwriting and O'Horgan's style of directing to international audiences. The La MaMa tours also allowed Stewart to create cross-cultural exchanges. She brought many notable international artists to La MaMa in Manhattan, including the Polish director Jerzy Grotowski in 1969 and the Romanian director Andrei Șerban in 1970.

Stewart also created site-specific productions internationally. In 1981, she directed Romeo and Juliet on the grounds of Leopoldskran Castle in Salzburg, Austria. In 2004, she directed Trojan Women at the ruins in Gardzienice, Poland.

La MaMa Umbria, in Spoleto, Italy, is an artist's retreat and cultural center founded in 1990 by Stewart with her MacArthur Grant money. Since 2000, La MaMa has held a three-week international symposium for directors at the Umbria location.

== Artistry ==
The European tours influenced Stewart's own aesthetic: "I learned in 1965, that English is not the beginning and end of anything. Generally, it's the ending, it messes you up." She also said that, "I found the plays that were the most visual were the ones people liked." These realizations shifted Stewart's primary interest from the playwright to the director. In the 1970s, Stewart was interested in pairing playwrights and directors as a kind of theatrical matchmaker. She also had an interest in playwrights who directed and/or were solo performers. Stewart's 1970s shift in focus aligned with the concurrent historical "end" of the original Off-Off-Broadway movement. While La MaMa is the only Off-Off-Broadway theatre of the core four Off-Off-Broadway theatres that continues to function, La MaMa has evolved and adapted beyond Stewart's original focus on the playwright.

=== Tom O'Horgan: first artistic director ===
In 1964, Tom O'Horgan joined La MaMa. Directing over sixty plays, including his all-male version of Jean Genet's The Maids, O'Horgan was crucial to La MaMa's development. He was the theatre's first Artistic Director and was also integral to La MaMa's international tours. As a musician, O'Horgan performed with the Chicago Civic Opera in his youth and had professional training as a harpist, and was also trained in ballet. He came to La MaMa from Second City, bringing his interest and knowledge of Viola Spolin and Paul Sills' role-playing theories of human behavior and games adapted for theatre. This background gave O'Horgan an interest in the totality of theatre, which aligned perfectly with Stewart's interest in a theatrical language that transcended text. This interest of Stewart's developed primarily from La MaMa's international touring. O'Horgan's direction included musically driven vocal and movement techniques, which contributed to the distinctive La MaMa genre of theatre.

=== The La MaMa Troupe ===
O'Horgan and Stewart decided to create a workshop to develop the particular type of actors needed for La MaMa's productions. O'Horgan went on to direct the La MaMa Troupe from 1965 to 1969. This decision was initiated by the experience of working on Three from La MaMa with National Educational Television. Three from La MaMa was a television program of three La MaMa theatre pieces: Pavane by Jean-Claude van Itallie; Fourteen Hundred Thousand by Sam Shepard; and The Recluse by Paul Foster. The executive director of National Educational Television, Brice Howard, would not allow any La MaMa actors to perform in Three from La MaMa. Howard declared that the La MaMa actors were too inexperienced, which led Stewart and O'Horgan to start the actor-training workshop.

In comparison to the psychological acting style and emphasis on method acting that was popular at the time, the La MaMa workshop focused on the other side of acting: externalized, kinetic techniques. The fifteen members of the La MaMa Troupe had workshops in movement, voice, and acting for five hours a day, five days a week. These workshops included hundreds of different exercises, which are best represented by Hair, an O'Horgan-directed show that transferred to Broadway in 1968. Village Voice critic Michael Smith wrote on Hair's Broadway opening: "O'Horgan has blown up Broadway." Hair brought international acclaim to O'Horgan and the La MaMa performance style.

For some of the actors in the La MaMa troupe, O'Horgan's Hair was a "betrayal" and a "crass commercialization of lovingly developed ensemble techniques." The success of Hair affected La MaMa's identity, as did O'Horgan's frequent lack of availability to direct later productions. O'Horgan left La MaMa in 1969.

== Actors' Equity and the showcase code ==
More experienced actors began to work at La MaMa as its reputation grew, creating problems with the Actors' Equity Association. In 1966, the union refused to allow their members to work at La MaMa without contracts. As a result, La MaMa was forced to shut down from October 12, 1966, until November 9, 1966.

Equity believed that since La MaMa did not pay its actors the theatre was competing with Off-Broadway and would have to shut down. Peter Feldman, an Off-Off-Broadway director, wrote into the New York Times disputing Equity's reasoning. He wrote that La MaMa "did provide a stimulating environment for actors to work" and that working at La MaMa often led to paying jobs for actors when productions got transferred to Off-Broadway or Broadway. Feldman also emphasized that Stewart was not a commercial producer, but the head of a not-for-profit theatre, and was thus being considered unfairly.

After a hearing with Stewart, the union resolved the conflict by creating a new showcase code. As long as La MaMa remained a private club, Equity actors could perform without contracts. This code still applies to Off-Off-Broadway productions today.

== Education ==
Through workshops, talk backs, meet-ups, collaborations with colleges, and artist's retreats, the organization has provided opportunities for other artists to develop within and beyond the downtown performing arts scene.

=== Collaborations with host institutions ===
In the early 1980s, La MaMa resident director Leonardo Shapiro and Trinity College professor and performer Judy Dworin sought to create a performing arts program under Trinity College in partnership with La MaMa. When approached with the idea of collaboration, Ellen Stewart responded enthusiastically, offering space for students to take classes at 47 Great Jones St. In 1986, Trinity/La MaMa Performing Arts Program formed, initiating La MaMa's first of many collaborative ventures with educational institutions. Examples of additional institutions that have worked with La MaMa include Sarah Lawrence College, which holds courses that allow students to engage in workshops with La MaMa artists and attend performances.

=== La MaMa Kids ===
Workshops for children and families occur monthly and are coordinated and taught by La MaMa resident artists. The basics of storytelling, dance, mask and puppet-making are common themes at the workshops. In addition, performances specifically geared to children are present in the La MaMa season.

== Archives ==
The La MaMa Archives is a collection chronicling the theatre's history and documenting the development of Off-Off-Broadway theatre. The collection includes approximately 70,000 items in a range of formats, including posters, programs, scripts, costumes, puppets, masks, musical instruments, correspondence, photographs, and audiovisual materials. The Archives has developed a chronological list of productions staged at La MaMa, and in 2014 received a grant from the Council on Library and Information Resources to create a searchable digital catalog of its collection. In 2016, the Archives received a grant from the National Historic Records and Publications Commission to support a collaborative project, with the Bay Area Video Coalition and the Wisconsin Center for Film and Theatre Research, that will result in expanded access to a collection of half-inch open reel videos that document theatrical work performed at La MaMa during the 1970s.

== Notable contributors ==
Many well-known actors, directors, playwrights, and companies, as well as lighting, costume, and set designers, have performed at La MaMa, including:

- Magaly Alabau
- Mary Alice
- Aaron Bell
- Barbara Benary
- Kenneth Bernard
- George Birimisa
- Black-Eyed Susan
- Blue Man Group
- John Braden
- Julie Bovasso
- Giannina Braschi
- Ed Bullins
- Tisa Chang
- Ping Chong
- Billy Crystal
- Jackie Curtis
- Candy Darling
- Robert De Niro
- Andre De Shields
- Loretta Devine
- Danny DeVito
- Ed Di Lello
- Johnny Dodd
- Lisa Edelstein
- Tom Eyen
- Harvey Fierstein
- Geraldine Fitzgerald
- Frederic Flamand
- Maureen Fleming
- Paul Foster
- Morgan Freeman
- Hanay Geiogamah
- Whoopi Goldberg
- Ellen Greene
- Helen Hanft
- Henry Hewes
- William M. Hoffman
- Anthony Ingrassia
- Ron Jeremy
- Bernie Kahn
- Tadeusz Kantor
- Leon Katz
- Geraldine Keams
- Harvey Keitel
- David Patrick Kelly
- Adrienne Kennedy
- H.M. Koutoukas
- Wilford Leach
- Leslie Lee
- Diane Lane
- Craig Lucas
- Charles Ludlam
- Mabou Mines
- Tommy Mandel
- Marshall W. Mason
- Manuel Martín Jr.
- Nancy Meckler
- Leonard Melfi
- Bette Midler
- Andy Milligan
- John Moran
- Tom Murrin
- Nick Nolte
- Susan Louise O'Connor
- Tom O'Horgan
- Hassan Ouakrim
- Rochelle Owens
- Al Pacino
- Pan Asian Repertory Theatre
- Robert Patrick
- People Show
- Meme Perlini
- Lisa Jane Persky
- Joe Pesci
- Michael Warren Powell
- Harry Reems
- Andrew Robinson
- Tadeusz Rozewicz
- Kikuo Saito
- Amy Sedaris
- David Sedaris
- Andrei Șerban
- Sam Shepard
- Patti Smith
- Julia Stiles
- Elizabeth Swados
- Megan Terry
- Theater of All Possibilities
- Theatre of the Ridiculous
- Winston Tong
- John Vaccaro
- Jean-Claude van Itallie
- Stephen Varble
- Herve Villechaize
- Christopher Walken
- Basil Wallace
- Jeff Weiss
- Richard Wesley
- James Wigfall
- Lanford Wilson
- Andy Wolk
- Holly Woodlawn
- Mary Woronov
- Ahmed Yacoubi
- Rina Yerushalmi
- Joel Zwick
