= Juliana Francis =

American dramatist

- Born: 1968 or 1969 (age 57–58)
- Other names: Julianna Francis, Juliana Francis-Kelly
- Occupations: Stage, film, television actress, playwright
- Years active: 1999–2010
- Spouse: David Patrick Kelly (m. 2005)
- Children: 1

Juliana Francis, also known as Juliana Francis-Kelly (born 1968 or 1969), is an American playwright and actress. She has received an Obie Award for her role in Richard Foreman's Maria Del Bosco and a Dramalogue Award for Reza Abdoh's The Hip-Hop Waltz of Eurydice. She has performed with Foreman's Ontological-Hysteric Theater, as well as Abdoh's Dar a Luz Company, where she was a founding member.

Following Abdoh's death, Francis transitioned into writing plays and screenplays. Her first play, Go Go Go (in which she also performed), was directed by Anne Bogart. It was performed at P.S. 122 in New York City and the London International Festival of Theatre at the Institute of Contemporary Arts. The play was later subsequently translated into Greek and performed by actress Marili Mastrantoni in Athens and Kiel, Germany.

Francis' second play, Box, was directed by Anthony Torn and staged at The Women's Project. Her other works include The Ontological Hysteric (published in the anthology Rowing to America by Smith & Kraus), which also had an Italian-language version performed at the Fontanon Festival in Rome. The Baddest Natashas, also directed by Torn, was performed at The Ontological Hysteric and later published by Open City. Saint Latrice, which Francis also directed, was performed at The Collapsable Hole and at P.S. 122, with a German-language adaptation staged in Graz, Austria. In 2004, Francis received a Sundance Screenwriting Fellowship to develop Saint Latrice into a screenplay for The Killer Films Company.

== Personal life ==
Juliana Francis married actor David Patrick Kelly on August 14, 2005, in New York City.
