= George Birimisa =

American playwright, actor, and theater director (1924 – 2012)

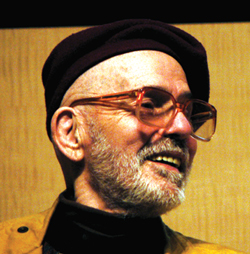
- Born: February 21, 1924; Santa Cruz, California, U.S.
- Died: May 10, 2012 (aged 88); San Francisco, California, U.S.
- Occupations: Playwright, actor, theater director, teacher
- Writing career
- Period: 1966–2012
- Genres: Drama
- Subjects: Gay theater, human isolation, working-class homosexual men
- Notable awards: Rockefeller Foundation Grant (1969); Drama-Logue Award (1978); Harry Hay Award (2004); Lambda Literary Award for Drama (2007)
- Movement: Off-Off-Broadway

George Birimisa (February 21, 1924 – May 10, 2012) was an American playwright, actor, and theater director who contributed to gay theater during the 1960s, the early years of the Off-Off-Broadway movement.

His works feature sexually explicit, emotionally charged depictions of working-class homosexual men, often closeted, in the years before the 1969 Stonewall riots prompted the gay rights movement. Contemporary Authors stated that "Birmisa's plays feature themes of human isolation, frustrated idealism, and rage against needless suffering, usually centered around homosexual characters." According to theatre critic and playwright Michael Smith, Birimisa's writing "links the pain of human isolation to economic and social roots." Birimisa remained an active playwright, author, editor, and teacher until the end of his life.

== Early life and career ==
Birimisa was born in Santa Cruz, California, one of five children born to Croatian Americans Charles and Anna (née Gjurovich) Birimisa. While George was still a child, his father died as the result of injuries while under arrest after speaking in support of the Communist Party at a labor rally.

Birimisa's mother remarried, but his stepfather rejected George and his two older brothers. He spent most of his childhood in a Catholic orphanage (St. Francis Catholic School for Boys) then in a series of foster homes. He left school after ninth grade. Birimisa married Nancy Linden in 1952, and they divorced in 1961.

After serving in the United States Navy Reserve during World War II, Birimisa supported himself with a series of jobs, including factory worker, bartender, disc jockey, health club manager, television network page, prostitute, and Howard Johnson's counterman. While working at Howard Johnson's on Sixth Avenue in Greenwich Village, he once refused service to Walter Winchell when Winchell arrived after closing. In retaliation, the journalist ran a column calling the restaurant a hangout for "vag-lewd" (slang for homosexual) types. This publicity turned that branch of Howard Johnson's into a popular destination for gay men. The incident convinced Birimisa, who had begun writing fictional accounts of his life, to start writing honestly about his sexuality. He started writing plays at the age 41 while studying acting with Uta Hagen at the Herbert Berghof Studio.

== Playwriting career ==
=== New York City ===
Birimisa's first play, Degrees, was produced at Theatre Genesis in the East Village of Manhattan in February 1966. The play portrayed a gay relationship; at the time, gay plays were not receiving critical attention. "For years," the playwright recalls, "even gay people would ask me, 'When are you going to write your first real play?'" Degrees included autobiographical elements, which would become more explicit in his later work. Birimisa wrote, "I don't agree that there are 'shades of truth'. We all know the truth, deep inside ourselves. As artists, we have a responsibility to reveal who we truly are, not to work in shades of gray. This truth includes our sexual beings."

Birimisa directed and acted in his best-known play, Daddy Violet, a semi-improvised indictment of the Vietnam War, in 1967. The play opened at the Troupe Theatre Club and at Caffe Cino, Joe Cino's coffeehouse that is generally acknowledged as the birthplace of the Off-Off-Broadway movement. The play subsequently toured colleges in the United States and Canada and appeared at the 1968 International Theater Festival in Vancouver. Birimisa acknowledged that he wrote Daddy Violet as a parody of the improvisational theater that was prominent at the time in an attempt to "out avant-garde everyone else." Birimisa revised the script to refer to the war in Iraq for a revival at the Boston Conservatory in 2006.

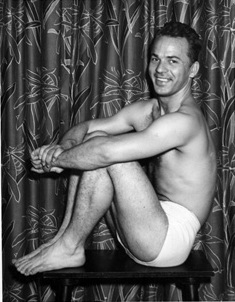

In 1969, Birimisa became the first openly gay playwright to receive a grant from the Rockefeller Foundation. This enabled him to attend rehearsals for the London production of his first two-act play, Mr. Jello, in April 1968. Mr. Jello is an arrangement of realistic vignettes that intersect to form a surrealistic social statement, with characters including a female impersonator, a gay married man, and a hustler. Mr. Jello was later produced at La MaMa Experimental Theatre Club in 1974.

Georgie Porgie, first produced on November 20, 1968, is another play of vignettes, illustrating the destructive force of self-hatred in gay men. The Village Voice wrote: "Birimisa's dialogue is graceful and pointed, his characterization swift and penetrating, and astonishingly, his most agonizing scenes are often his most hilarious, as if he's able to reach greater heights of pain and laughter by having the two lean on each other... Birimisa's considerable talent [is] as fluid as it is raw, as passionate as it is brutal." The Best Plays of 1968–1969 listed Georgie Porgie as a highlight of the Off-Off-Broadway season. Contemporary Authors quotes a review in Variety calling Georgie Porgie "'an advance in its field, and unlike many of its stage predecessors (Boys in the Band and Foreplay, to pick two), Birimisa's play minces few images or words in describing the plight of its characters. The coarse language and nudity are used for psychological effect as the characters face melodramatic situations,' continued Variety, 'while Birimisa permits the action to develop to logically and sometimes surprising conclusions.'" The play's male nudity and simulations of sex prevented the planned transfer to Off-Broadway, though a 1971 Off-Broadway revival of Georgie Porgie ran for 107 performances.

The 1971 revival highlighted mainstream critics' continued resistance to gay plays, even after the Off-Broadway success of Mart Crowley's The Boys in the Band in 1968. One review stated "Georgie Porgie at Greenwich Village's Fortune Theatre is a play written by a homosexual, about a homosexual, with a special interest for homosexuals. This is not to say that it isn't a serious effort. Indeed, it's a well performed attempt to accurately portray the totality of the homosexual experience...[C]hildhood ridicule, repulsion by parental heterosexual relations, brutality and beatings directed against homosexuals, falsified testimony by police vice squads, male prostitution, black and white homosexual attraction, biceps worship, marriage between homosexuals and women are all touched upon...Georgie Porgie, then, is a limited appeal show since so many find the entire subject unpopular and distasteful."

=== Los Angeles ===
Birimisa moved to Los Angeles in 1976. He dismisses the three plays he wrote while living there, A Dress Made of Diamonds and Pogey Bait (both 1976) and A Rainbow in the Night (1978), as inferior to his earlier works. However, A Rainbow in the Night, an autobiographical portrait of two gay men living on the Bowery in 1953, won a 1978 Drama-Logue Award, and Pogey Bait, a comedy based on Birimisa's wartime experience as a gay apprentice seaman, was subsequently produced in Minneapolis, San Francisco, New York City, and Los Angeles.

=== San Francisco ===
Birimisa moved to San Francisco in 1980 and did not write another play for nearly 10 years. While living there, he began a revised version of A Rainbow in the Night called The Man With Straight Hair, which premiered at the Studio at Theatre Rhinoceros in 1994. His one-man play Looking for Mr. America, debuted in San Francisco at Josie's Cabaret and Juice Joint in 1995 and subsequently played in New York at La MaMa Experimental Theatre Club. Birimisa performed the show at the age of 71, in the role of a man recounting his lifelong sexual addiction. Dean Goodman's review noted that the play offers "an eloquent and touching portrait of a particular gay man's journey through the last half of the 20th century."

Viagra Falls, written in 2005, had a concert performance at La MaMa on September 17, 2007, under the direction of Daniel Haben Clark. The play chronicles a young gay man's long-term sadomasochistic relationship with a closeted ophthalmologist.

With Steve Susoyev, Birimisa edited Return to Caffe Cino, an anthology of essays and plays by writers associated with the Cino. The book won a 2007 Lambda Literary Award for Drama. Birimisa: Portraits, Plays, Perversions, an anthology of collected works and essays about Birimisa's personal life and career, was published in 2009. The anthology includes the unproduced screenplay The Kewpie-Doll Kiss, which chronicles Birimisa's childhood loss of his father, abandonment by his mother, and discovery of his sexuality, subjects he had earlier explored in A Dress Made of Diamonds (1976).

Birmisa taught creative writing beginning in 1983, sponsored by New Leaf Services. He received the 2004 Harry Hay Award in recognition of his writing and community service. Before his death in 2012, he was writing an autobiography titled Wildflowers. Birimisa's unpublished manuscripts are in the Joe Cino Memorial Library at the New York Public Library for the Performing Arts at Lincoln Center.
