= Doric Wilson =

American dramatist (1939–2011)

Doric Wilson with the 2007 IT Award for Artistic Achievement

Doric Wilson (February 24, 1939 – May 7, 2011) was an American playwright, director, producer, critic and gay rights activist.

He was born Alan Doric Wilson in Los Angeles, California, where his family was temporarily located. Originally from the Pacific Northwest, he was raised on his grandfather's ranch at Plymouth, Washington on the Columbia River. He wrote his first play at Kennewick High School, but was accused of plagiarism when a teacher informed him that no student of hers would ever be able to write such a play.

== Training ==
Wilson received his early theater training under Lorraine Larson, apprenticed with Dorothy Seeburger and the Richland Players, and studied briefly at the Drama Department of the University of Washington until he was forced to leave after he initiated a one-person protest against anti-gay sniper attacks at a nearby park.

== New York career ==
Wilson moved to NYC in 1959 where he had a brief acting career playing such roles as Valère to the Mariane of Dawn Wells (later Mary Ann on Gilligan's Island) in Molière's Tartuffe and Older Patrick to Nancy Wilder's Auntie Mame in various stock productions. In 1961, he became one of the first resident playwrights at NYC's legendary Caffe Cino, his comedy, And He Made a Her, opened there with Jane Lowry and Larry Neil Clayton leading the cast and Paxton Whitehead directing.

The success of his four plays at Caffe Cino helped, in the words of playwright Robert Patrick, "establish the Cino as a venue for new plays, and materially contributed to the then-emerging concept of Off-Off-Broadway." His Now She Dances! (1961), a fantasia on the trial of Oscar Wilde, was the first Off-Off-Broadway play to deal positively with gay people. Now She Dances! is the subject of season one (2021) of the LGBTQ theatre history podcast, Out Lines.

Under the mentorship of producer Richard Barr, Wilson became a pioneer of the alternative theatre movement, dedicating his career to writing, directing, producing and/or designing hundreds of productions. He was one of the first playwrights invited to join the Barr/Wilder/Albee Playwright's Unit and later became a founding member of Circle Repertory Company.

== Gay activism ==
A veteran of the anti-war and civil rights demonstrations of the early 1960s-mid 1970s, Wilson was a participant in the Stonewall Riots (1969) and became active in the early days of the New York Gay Liberation movement as a member of GAA (Gay Activist Alliance). He supported his theatrical endeavors by becoming a "star" bartender and manager of the post-Stonewall gay bar scene, opening such landmark institutions as The Spike, TY's and Brothers & Sisters Cabaret. In 2004, Wilson was named a Grand Marshal of the 35th Anniversary Pride Day Parade in New York City. He is featured in the documentary Stonewall Uprising (2010) by Kate Davis and David Heilbroner.

== Gay theater ==
In 1974, Wilson (with Billy Blackwell, Peter del Valle and John McSpadden) formed TOSOS (The Other Side of Silence), the first professional theatre company to deal openly and honestly with the gay experience. The company featured new plays and revivals by such writers as Brendan Behan, Noël Coward, Christopher Hampton, Joe Orton, Terrence McNally, Robert Patrick, Sandra Scoppettone, Martin Sherman and Lanford Wilson. Theatre scholar Jordan Schildcrout writes that TOSOS "combined the non-commercial and experimental ethos of the Caffe Cino with the politics and community activism of the gay liberation movement."

In June 2001, Wilson, and directors Mark Finley and Barry Childs resurrected the company as TOSOS II. TOSOS produces two full-length plays each season, in addition to the Chesley/Chambers Play-Reading Series, named after playwrights Robert Chesley and Jane Chambers, both friends of Wilson's. Recent productions include a revival of Wilson's Street Theater, as well as Waiting for Giovanni by Jewelle Gomez, Secret Identity by Chris Weikel, and Bar Dykes by Merril Mushroom.

== Death ==
Wilson died on May 7, 2011, aged 72, from natural causes at his home in Manhattan.

== Reviewer ==
Over the years Wilson reviewed theater for Other Stages, The Villager in NYC and various publications in Los Angeles, Seattle and Portland, Oregon. Selected reviews are posted on the Purple Circuit.

== Principal plays ==
- And He Made a Her (Caffe Cino, NYC, 1961)
- Babel Babel Little Tower (Caffe Cino, NYC, 1961)
- Now She Dances! (One act version: Caffe Cino, NYC, 1961; full-length version: Flexible Deadlock, Glasgow, Scotland, 2000)
- Pretty People (Caffe Cino, NYC, 1961)
- Some People Are (opera libretto for Walter Torgerson, 1966)
- In Absence (45th Street Playhouse, NYC, 1968)
- The West Street Gang (TOSOS, Spike Bar, NYC, 1977)
- A Perfect Relationship (The Glines, NYC, 1978)
- Turnabout (under pseudonym Howard Aldon) (Richland Players, Washington, 1980)
- Forever After (The First Gay American Arts Festival, NYC, 1980)
- Street Theatre (Theatre Rhinoceros, San Francisco, 1982; Meridian Theater, The Mineshaft, NYC, 1983)

== Publishing ==
United Stages has published Now She Dances!; Street Theatre; and And He Made a Her (which includes a CD of the original 1961 Caffe Cino performance). Earlier versions of Street Theater and A Perfect Relationship are published by TNT Press; Street Theater is also included in the Don Shewey edited anthology Out Front (Grove Press).

== Awards and honors ==
- 2010 Honorary Golden Pineapple Award for Lifetime Achievement, presented by NY Artists Unlimited.
- 2010 PassionFruit Award for Enduring and Continuing Pioneer Work in LGBT Theater, Fresh Fruit Festival
- 2009 Elected a member of the National Theater Conference:
- 2009 ATHE (Association for Theatre in Higher Education) Career Achievement Award
- 2007 Mark Finley presented Wilson with the Artistic Achievement Award from the New York Innovative Theatre Awards. This honor was bestowed on Wilson on behalf of his peers and fellow artists of the Off-Off-Broadway community "in recognition of his visionary artistic contributions and unwavering dedication and character that helped shape the Off-Off-Broadway community."
- 1994 - The first Robert Chesley Award for Lifetime Achievement in Gay and Lesbian Playwrighting.
- Numerous "best play" honors, including: 1982: The Villager and the Chambers-Blackwell Best Play citations for Street Theater; 2002-3: oobr Award for A Perfect Relationship; 2007: nomination of the 2007 Lambda Award for the revival of And He Made a Her.

== The Doric Wilson Awards ==
There are two theater awards named for Doric Wilson.

The International Dublin Gay Theatre Festival has presented the Doric Wilson Award for International Cultural Dialogue Through Theater every year since 2011. The award is presented each year at the Festival Gala to an artist or company whose work has created new or innovative dialogue about LGBTQ issues.

The New York Independent Theater Awards have presented the Doric Wilson Independent Playwright Award since 2012. The award is given to a playwright whose writing "honors the innovation, uncompromising vision, heart, and spirit that was Doric Wilson and his work."
