= William M. Hoffman =

American playwright, theatre director, editor, and professor

- Born: April 12, 1939; New York City, New York, U.S.
- Died: April 29, 2017 (aged 78)
- Writing career
- Period: 1960s–2017
- Notable works: As Is; The Ghosts of Versailles

William M. Hoffman (April 12, 1939 – April 29, 2017) was an American playwright, theatre director, editor, and professor.

== Life and career ==
Hoffman was born in New York City to Johanna (Papiermeister), a jeweler, and Morton Hoffman, a caterer.

Hoffman's early work was produced in off-off-Broadway theaters, such as La MaMa Experimental Theatre Club. His first production with La MaMa was the play Thank You, Miss Victoria, produced alongside works by Jean-Claude van Itallie and Leonard Melfi on tour in Copenhagen in 1965. La MaMa then presented the works by Hoffman, van Itallie, and Melfi alongside works by Paul Foster, Sam Shepard, and Lanford Wilson in New York in 1966 as "Six Plays from the 1965-1966 European Tour". He was the narrator for Louis Mofsie's production of Three Mask Plays with the Thunderbird American Indian Dancers at La MaMa in 1966. Lee Hickman directed Hoffman's Spring Play, which featured a performance by Harvey Keitel, at La MaMa in 1967.

John Vaccaro directed the Playhouse of the Ridiculous in Hoffman's XXXXX at La MaMa in 1972. Jacque Lynn Colton directed Hoffman's A Quick Nutbread to Make Your Mouth Water in California in 1974, and Vaccaro directed La MaMa's C.E.T.A. company in Hoffman's adaptation of Gulliver's Travels in 1978. Vaccaro also directed La MaMa - C.E.T.A. in a production of Hoffman's A Book of Etiquette in 1978 and again in 1979. In 1981, Vaccaro directed a production of XXXXX featuring music by John Braden.

In 1985, Hoffman achieved critical acclaim and public recognition when the Broadway production of his play As Is, one of the early plays about AIDS, opened at the Lyceum Theatre in New York, where it ran for 285 performances. He won a Drama Desk Award for Outstanding Play (1985) and an Obie Award for playwriting (1984–1985), and was nominated for a Tony Award for Best Play (1985). The following year, he adapted As Is for a television production directed by Michael Lindsay-Hogg.

In 1991, Hoffman was commissioned by the Metropolitan Opera to write the libretto for The Ghosts of Versailles, first produced in celebration of the opera company's centennial. A 1993 television production starring Teresa Stratas, Renée Fleming, and Graham Clark was released in 1993, and Hoffman received a nomination for a Primetime Emmy Award.

Hoffman worked as an editor at Hill and Wang and promoted the careers of Lanford Wilson, Tom Eyen, and Joe Orton, including their work in his "New American Plays" series or his anthology Gay Plays: A First Collection.

Until his death in 2017, Hoffman was an associate professor of theatre at Lehman College at the City University of New York.

== Published plays ==
Year listed is when the play was first produced.

- As Is (1985)
- A Book of Etiquette (1978)
- The Cherry Orchard, Part II (1983)
- Children's Crusade (1972)
- Cornbury (with Anthony Holland) (1979)
- From Fool to Hanged Man (1972)
- Giles De Rais (1975)
- Good Night, I Love You (1966)
- Gulliver's Travels (1978)
- Incantation (1967)
- Luna (1970)
- A Quick Nutbread to Make Your Mouth Water (1970)
- Saturday Night at the Movies (1966)
- Shoe Palace Murray (1978)
- Thank You, Miss Victoria (1965)
- xxx (aka Nativity Play) (1969)
- The Ghosts of Versailles (1991)

== Additional credits ==
- One Life to Live (scriptwriter, mid-1990s)

== Additional awards ==
- Daytime Emmy Award nomination for Outstanding Drama Series Writing Team, One Life to Live (1992; as part of 15-person team)
- Writers Guild of America Award for Best Writing, One Life to Live (1996)
