= Robert Patrick (playwright) =

American playwright (1937–2023)

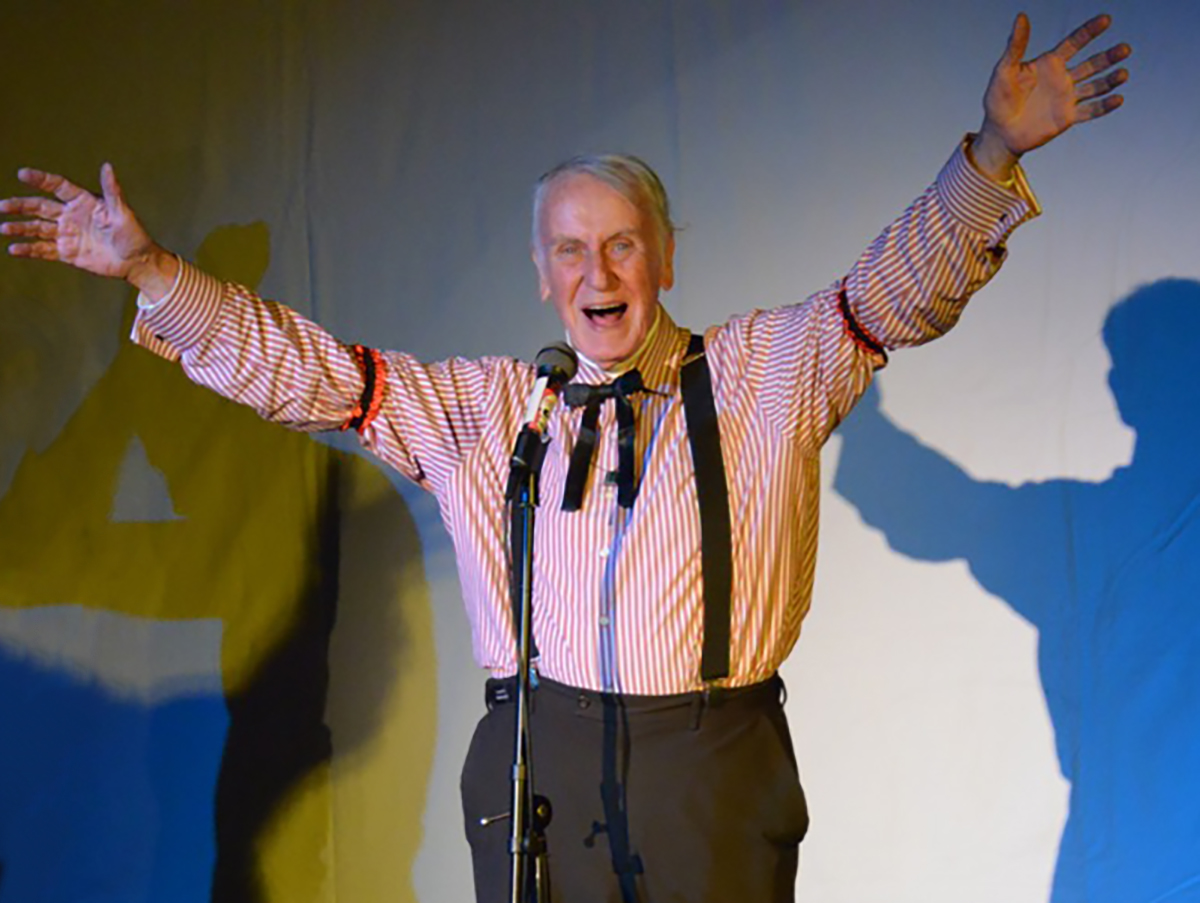
- Born: Robert Patrick O'Connor; September 27, 1937; Kilgore, Texas, U.S.
- Died: April 23, 2023 (aged 85); Los Angeles, California, U.S.
- Occupations: Playwright; poet; actor; lyricist
- Writing career
- Period: 1960s–2023
- Genres: Dramas, comedies, musicals
- Notable works: Kennedy's Children, Camera Obscura, Temple Slave

Robert Patrick (born Robert Patrick O'Connor; September 27, 1937 – April 23, 2023) was an American playwright, poet, lyricist, short story writer, and novelist.

Patrick was a prolific playwright, with more than 300 productions of his plays staged in New York City, including Broadway venues.

== Early life ==
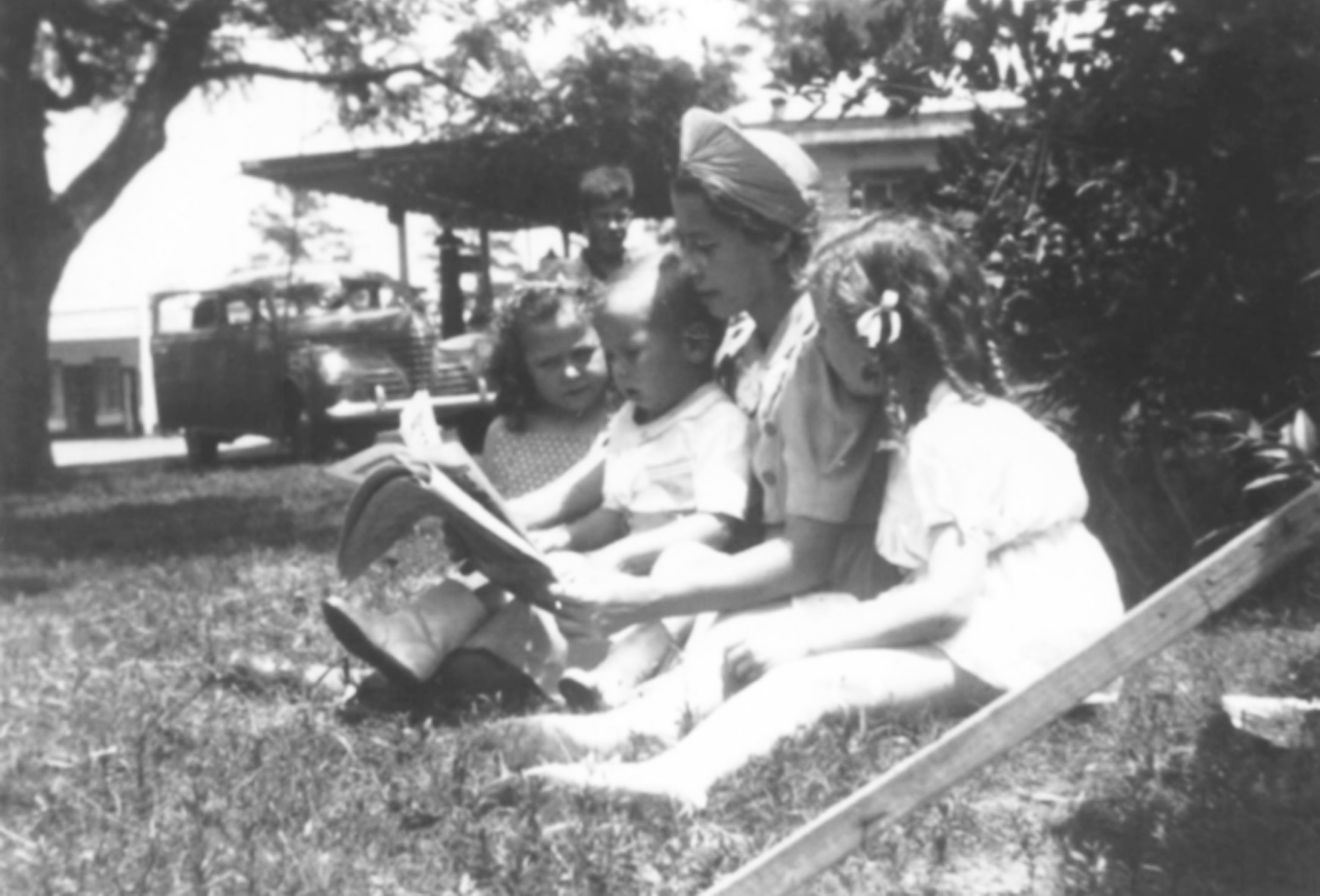
Patrick's mother always encouraged him to read.

O'Connor was born in Kilgore, Texas, to migrant workers. Because his parents constantly moved around the southwestern United States looking for work, he never went to one school for a full year until his senior year of high school, in Roswell, New Mexico. Books, film, and radio were the only constants in his early life. His mother made sure he learned to read, and arranged for him to start school a year early. He lacked friendships due to the constant moving, and didn't do well in school. He dropped out of college after two years. He did not experience live theater, beyond a few school productions, until he was working one summer as a dishwasher at the Kennebunkport Playhouse in Kennebunkport, Maine and fell in love with the theater.

Patrick stopped in New York City on his way back to Roswell from Maine and happened upon the Caffe Cino, the first Off-Off Broadway theatre, on September 14, 1961. He stayed in New York, working for free at the Caffe Cino, La Mama ETC, and other early Off-Off Broadway theaters in any capacity, and supported himself with temporary typing jobs while observing and participating in dozens of productions, including Lanford Wilson's So Long at the Fair. He had already been writing poetry, and in 1964 wrote his first play, The Haunted Host. The play was soon produced at Caffe Cino, and playwriting became his main focus.

== Career ==
Patrick wrote and published over sixty plays.

=== 1960s ===
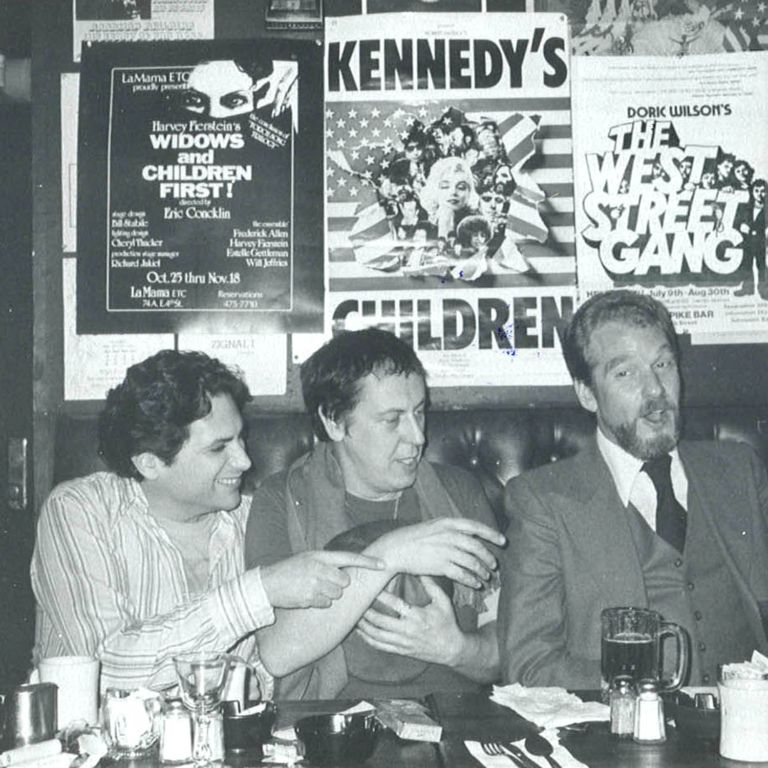
Harvey Fierstein, Robert Patrick and Doric Wilson.

His first play, The Haunted Host, premiered at Caffe Cino in 1964. Patrick denied Neil Flanagan, the Caffe Cino's star performer, the title role (because Flanagan had recently played Lanford Wilson's gay character, Lady Bright), and after other prominent Off-Off actors refused the role because they feared playing a gay character might damage their careers, Patrick appeared in the play himself alongside fellow playwright William M. Hoffman.

Patrick also worked at La MaMa Experimental Theatre Club, another of the first Off-Off-Broadway theatres. Neil Flanagan directed a production of Patrick's play Mirage at La MaMa in July 1965. In November 1965, Patrick was production coordinator for BbAaNnGg, a benefit to raise money for electrical work at La MaMa's 122 Second Avenue theatre, which included plays, spoken word, performance art, and film by many prominent Off-Off artists.

In 1969, he won the Show Business magazine Best Play Award for Joyce Dynel, Salvation Army, and Fog. Also in 1969, his play Camera Obscura was produced on PBS, starring Marge Champion, and was chosen to be in the well-known playwright revue "Collision Course".

Patrick was a prolific pioneer in Off-Off-Broadway and gay theatre, with over 300 productions of his plays during the 1960s in New York City alone. In 1972, the publisher and licensing company Samuel French called Patrick "New York's Most-Produced Playwright".

=== 1970s ===
Patrick directed a production of his own play, The Richest Girl in the World Finds Happiness, at La MaMa in 1970. He directed his own plays, Valentine Rainbow at La MaMa and The Golden Circle at 119 Spring Street, both in 1972.

Patrick directed holiday shows at La MaMa in 1971, 1972, and 1974. The 1971 production was called La MaMa Christmas Show, the 1972 production was Play-by-Play, and the 1974 production was Play-by-Play: A Spectacle of Ourselves. In 1973, he directed Paul Foster's Silver Queen, which featured music by John Braden, at La MaMa.

In 1973, Patrick's Kennedy's Children had an obscure opening in the back of a London pub theatre called the King's Head, in Islington. The production was instantly successful and was signed for the West End and other international productions. 1974 was the first season of gay theatre in the United Kingdom, to which Patrick contributed three plays. His play Cleaning House was produced in California during the summer of 1974.

A 1974 Boston production of The Haunted Host was the first time Harvey Fierstein appeared on the professional stage as a man. Years later, Fierstein included a recording of Patrick's monologue "Pouf Positive" on his compact disc This Is Not Going to Be Pretty. "Pouf Positive" was also filmed by Dov Hechtman in 1989.

The 1975 Broadway production of Kennedy's Children earned Shirley Knight a 1976 Tony Award for Best Performance by a Featured Actress in a Play. She reprised her role in the 1979 CBS production of the play.

Patrick traveled widely, from Anchorage to Cape Town, to see productions of Kennedy's Children. For ten years, he visited high schools and high school theatre conventions nationwide on behalf of the International Thespian Society.

In 1976, Marlo Thomas commissioned Patrick to write My Cup Ranneth Over for her and Lily Tomlin. Although they never performed in the play, it would become Patrick's most produced work.

Patrick co-wrote Da Nutrcracker in Da Bronx with Jeannine O'Reilly and Paul Foster; the production was directed by Powell Shepard at La MaMa in 1977.

T-Shirts was first produced in 1979, starring Jack Wrangler, and was later chosen as the opening piece in the anthology Gay Plays: A First Collection.

=== 1980s ===
Patrick directed The Richest Girl in the World Finds Happiness at La MaMa again in 1981. His Blue Is For Boys was the first play about gay teenagers, and the Manhattan borough president declared a Blue is for Boys Weekend in honor of the play in 1983 and again in 1986. The Trial of Socrates was the first gay play presented by New York. Hello Bob, an account of Patrick's experiences with the production of Kennedy's Children, was the last play he directed before leaving New York for California.

=== Later work ===
Other work by Patrick includes Untold Decades (1988), seven one-act plays giving a humorous and emotional history of gay life in the United States, and Temple Slave, a novel about the early days of Off-Off-Broadway and gay theatre. Patrick has also ghostwritten several screenplays for film and television; contributed poems and reviews to Playbill, FirstHand, and Adult Video News; and had his short stories published in anthologies.

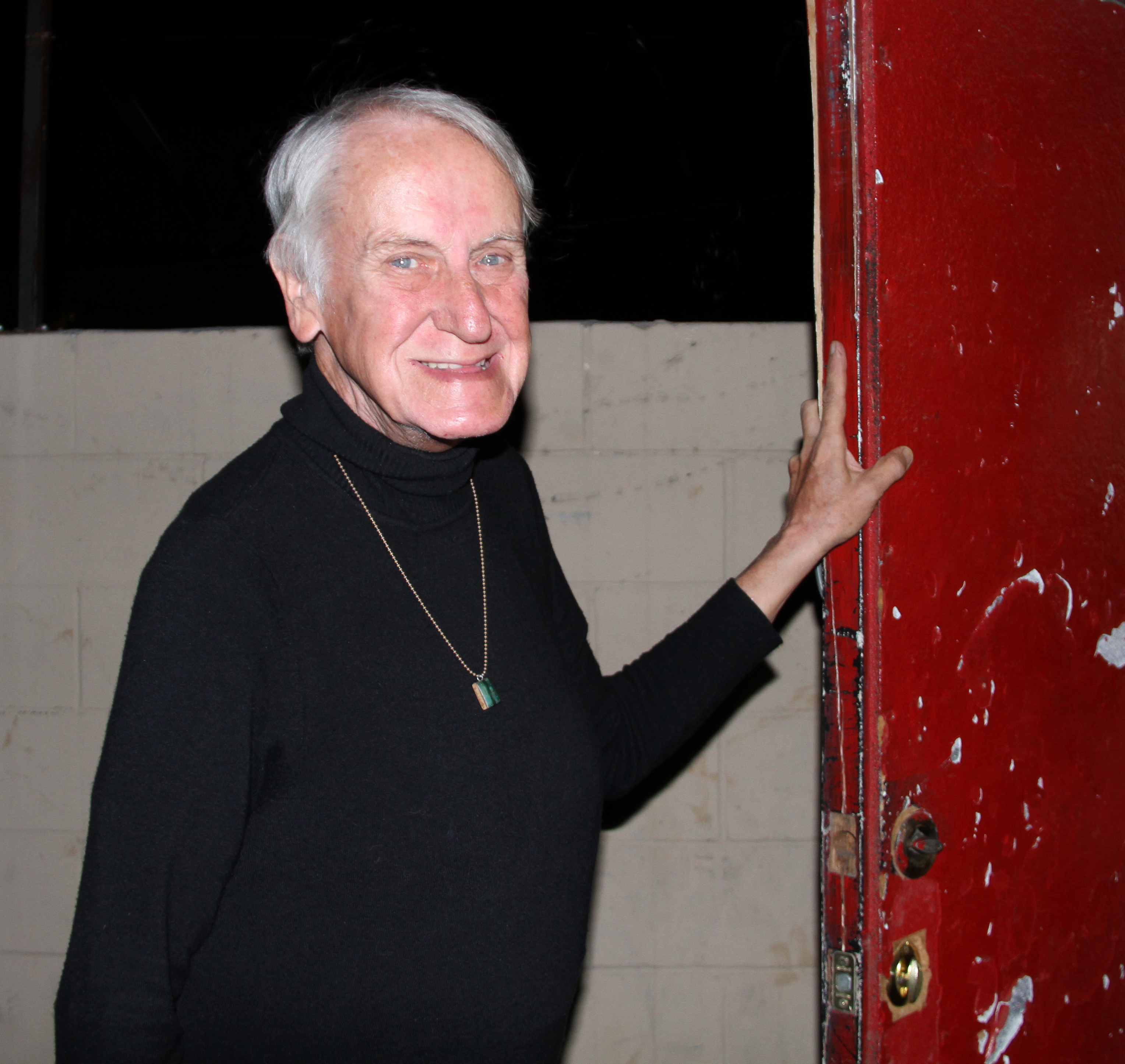
Robert Patrick at the backstage door minutes before the premiere of his solo show "What Doesn't Kill Me...Makes a Great Story Later"

Patrick appeared in the documentaries Resident Alien, with Quentin Crisp, and Wrangler: Anatomy of an Icon, and in the videos O is for Orgy: The Sequel and O Boys: Parties, Porn, and Politics, both produced by the O Boys Network.

Patrick later published his memoir Film Moi or Narcissus in the Dark and the plays Hollywood at Sunset and Michelangelo's Models. He retired from theatre in 1990 and moved to Los Angeles in 1993.

In 2010, he published a DVD of his lecture "Caffe Cino: Birthplace of Gay Theatre" and two books of poems, A Strain of Laughter and Bitter with the Sweet, with Lulu.com. In 2013, he was brought back onto the stage by young Los Angeles underground theatre artists, appearing as a reader, singer, and actor. In March 2014, he gave a solo performance about his career entitled, "What Doesn't Kill Me...Makes a Great Story Later," which featured a capella renditions of many of his original songs. This was followed by two more solo evenings of his original song, entitled "Bob Capella" and "New Songs for Old Movies".

In 2020, L.A. Art Documents made a short film of Patrick reciting his original poetry entitled "Robert Patrick's The Theory of Romance".

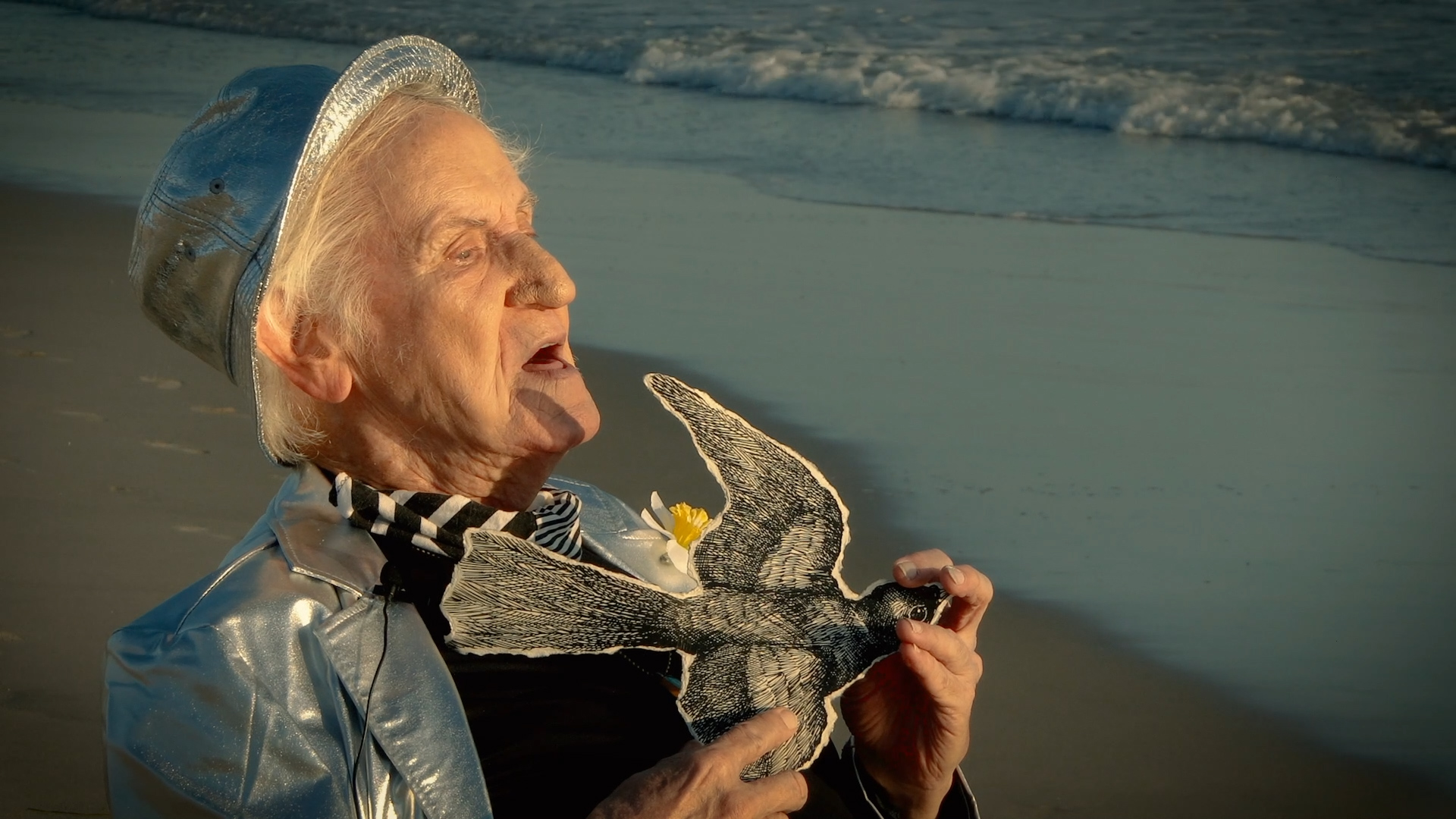
Still image from the film "Robert Patrick's The Theory of Romance"

== Death ==
Patrick died at his home in Los Angeles on April 23, 2023, at the age of 85. His body was discovered by police after he had failed to meet up with a friend for a coffee date. A special 10-hour BOBcast: A Celebration of Life for Robert Patrick Playwright featuring a variety of special guests and tributes was broadcast on September 27, 2023, by La MaMa Etc. & CultureHub and is available to view online.

=== Awards ===
- Show Business Best Play Award, 1969
- Glasgow Citizens' Theatre Best World Playwrighting Award, 1973
- International Thespian Society Founders Award for Services to Theatre and to Youth, 1980 (first openly gay recipient)
- Blue is for Boys Weekends in the Borough of Manhattan, 1983 and 1986
- Robert Chesley Award For Lifetime Achievement In Gay Playwrighting, 1996
- West Hollywood Gay and Lesbian Advisory Board's Rainbow Key Award for having been instrumental in the beginnings of gay and Off-Off-Broadway theatre, 2008
- New York Innovative Theatre Artistic Achievement Award, 2011
- Chuck Rowland Award for 50 Years of Service to Gay Theatre, 2014

== Selected works ==
=== Plays ===
- The Haunted Host (1964)
- Joyce Dynel (1969)
- Salvation Army (1969)
- Fog (1969)
- Camera Obscura (1969)
- Pouf Positive
- Kennedy's Children (1974)
- One Man, One Woman
- Play-By-Play
- The Golden Circle
- Tools Not Rules
- My Cup Ranneth Over (1976)
- T-Shirts (1979)
- Mutual Benefit Life
- Mercy Drop
- Blue Is For Boys (1983)
- Untold Decades (1988)
- Michelangelo's Models
- Bread Alone
- The Trial of Socrates
- Judas
- The Trojan Women (after Euripides)
- The Last Stroke
- Hello, Bob
- Evan on Earth
- All at Sea (book and score)
- Hollywood at Sunset
- What Doesn't Kill Me Makes a Great Story Later (2013 - 2014)

=== Collections and anthologies ===
- Robert Patrick's Cheap Theatricks
- Mercy Drop and Other Plays
- Gay Plays: A First Collection (edited by William M. Hoffman; includes T-Shirts)
- Contra/Dictions
- The Mammoth Book of Gay Short Stories
- Flesh & the Word 2 & 3
- Best Gay Erotica (2009; 2010)
- Up by Wednesday (2014)
- Untold Decades: Seven Comedies of Gay Romance

=== Poetry ===
- "Benedicktion," published in RFD magazine #104

=== Screenplays ===
- Ghost Story (television, 1972)
- High-Tide (television, 1990)
- Robin's Hoods (television, 1994)
- Delusion (film, 2004)
- numerous ghostwritten works

=== Film and video roles ===
- Resident Alien (1990)
- O Is for Orgy: The Sequel
- O Boys: Parties, Porn, and Politics
- Wrangler: Anatomy of an Icon (2008)
