= Tom O'Horgan =

American director, actor, and musician (1924–2009)

- O'Horgan in 2004
- Born: May 3, 1924; Chicago, Illinois, U.S.
- Died: January 11, 2009 (aged 84); Venice, Florida, U.S.
- Education: DePaul University
- Occupations: Theater director, composer, actor
- Years active: 1960s–1990s

Tom O'Horgan (May 3, 1924 – January 11, 2009) was an American theater and film director, composer, actor and musician. He is best known for his Broadway work as director of the hit musicals Hair and Jesus Christ Superstar. During his career he sought to achieve a form of "total theater" described by The New York Times as "wittily physical", and which earned him a reputation as the "Busby Berkeley of the acid set".

== Early years ==
Born in Chicago, Illinois, O'Horgan was introduced to theater by his father, a newspaper owner and sometimes actor, who took him to shows and built him footlights and a wind machine. As a child he sang in churches and wrote operas, including one entitled Doom of the Earth at age 12.

O'Horgan received his degree from DePaul University, where he learned to play dozens of musical instruments. After graduating, he worked in Chicago as a harpist and also performed with the Second City, the Chicago improvisational theater company. He moved to New York City and began acting downtown at places such as Judson Memorial Church. During this time, he developed a night-club act in which he performed improvisational humor while he accompanied himself on the harp.

== Career ==
O'Horgan thought of his work as "kinetic sculpture" and said that his goal was to be "able to blend all aspects of the theatre without letting any part become secondary to the others". Of contemporary commercial theater, he believed that people are "hung up on chandeliers because they insist that the one-dimensional, verbal Ibsenite theater is the only theater. But this is an aberration of the 19th century. If the ideas are the primary thing, it's not theater. Theater has always meant music, dance, art. That's what the Greek theater was." Shortly after Hair opened on Broadway, Eleanore Lester wrote in The New York Times: "O'Horgan, a veteran of many years of experimentation and frustration in his search for The Way in theater, successfully incorporates a number of strands coming on strong in the rapidly evolving post-Miller-Williams-Albee and post-absurdist theater. Those trends, growing partly out of the intimate Off Off Broadway movement and partly out of the visceral political drama of be-ins, sit-ins and demonstrations, include the use of improvisational techniques, vigorous ensemble playing, a more physical style of acting, greater use of dance, music, and puppets, and Pop-camp comedy – plus the Total Theater concept in which the audience becomes more closely involved in the work."

O'Horgan said that an element of his artistic gratification is "just getting the vicarious joy of turning people on, making them respond, turning them on to their own sensual powers that are buried under layers of cement. When you see how people in the streets will run to see a fire or an accident or a fight, hoping against hope to see something really happen, something that will prove that the people walking beside them are more than mere mannequins, you realize how much they want to break out of all their emotional rigidity." Though he would become well known for his Broadway work, he was more comfortable in the Off-Broadway world. As he told Lester in 1968: "Sure, I've been sent scripts from Broadway offices, but so far I haven't seen anything that I could possibly be interested in. Of course, I'll continue working with La MaMa. Where else can you work things out? Certainly not on Broadway where the meter is always running."

=== Off-Broadway and Off-Off-Broadway ===
Most of his early career work was in Off-Off-Broadway experimental theatre productions. One of his earliest projects was Love and Vexations at the Caffe Cino in September 1963. Soon thereafter, his friend James Wigfall introduced him to Ellen Stewart (founder of La MaMa, E.T.C.), who would go on to become one of his staunchest supporters. The first play he directed there was The Maids by Jean Genet in 1964, and he later led a La MaMa troupe that went to Denmark to showcase early plays by Sam Shepard and Lanford Wilson. He directed some 50 productions at La MaMa including The Architect and the Emperor of Assyria by Fernando Arrabal, a surrealist play about two men on an island, and Tom Paine by Paul Foster, a recounting of the life of the US Revolutionary War figure.

O'Horgan directed and also composed music for the Rochelle Owens play Futz!. He first directed the play off-off-Broadway for La MaMa in March 1967 and later took it to the Edinburgh Festival and then to New York's Theater de Lys, an off-Broadway venue in June 1968. O'Horgan also directed a film version of Futz! that was released in 1969. Futz! tells the story of the difficulties a farm boy encounters with the people of the town when he falls in love with his pig. Clive Barnes wrote in The New York Times, "Mr. O'Horgan ... has visualized Futz! as some kind of Dionysiac dance, wild and fevered. He sends his actors mugging and careening across the stage in great joyous surges of energy." Hair authors James Rado and Gerome Ragni attended the La MaMa production of Futz! and it influenced them to choose O'Horgan to direct Hair on Broadway.

In November 1974, he conceived and directed a stage adaptation of The Beatles' classic recording Sgt. Pepper's Lonely Hearts Club Band. The show, entitled Sgt. Pepper's Lonely Hearts Club Band on the Road, played at the Beacon Theatre concert venue on Manhattan's Upper West Side. The production, developed in collaboration with Hair set designer Robin Wagner, featured 34 actors performing 29 Beatles songs with elaborate scenery, special effects and colorful costumes. The show was not well received by critics and closed in January 1975 after 66 performances.

Among O'Horgan's other off-Broadway credits include the Second City revues at the Village East To the Water Tower, When the Owl Screams, and The Wrecking Ball as composer, as well as Masked Men (at the Westbeth Theatre) and Birdbath as director.

=== Broadway ===
==== Hair ====
O'Horgan made his Broadway directorial debut in 1968 with the ground-breaking musical, Hair. Based on his growing reputation with Futz! and other off-off-Broadway plays he directed, Hair authors Ragni and Rado sought out O'Horgan to direct the Off-Broadway production of the show when it opened at The Public Theater in the fall of 1967, but O'Horgan was working in Europe at the time and was unable to accept the invitation. When the show made the transition uptown to Broadway, O'Horgan was called again and this time he was able to accept.

Hair underwent a massive overhaul from its downtown version to its Broadway opening in April 1968. The Off-Broadway book, already light on plot, was loosened even further, and 13 new songs were added. O'Horgan said that "I see [Hair] as a singspiel, a popular opera." In rehearsals, he used techniques passed down by Viola Spolin and Paul Sills of improvisational "games" and role playing theories that encouraged freedom and spontaneity. Many of these improvisations were incorporated into the Broadway script. He prepared actors by having them undress in slow motion, praying to God and Buddha and jostling one another. He had them deliver lines while being carried around or doing handstands. The Playbill notice for the 2009 Broadway revival of Hair sayid O'Horgan and new choreographer Julie Arenal infused the production with a sense of "freedom and spontaneity, introducing an organic, expansive style of staging" that had never been seen before on Broadway. Also, O'Horgan had used nudity in many of the plays he directed, and he helped integrate the idea into the fabric of the show. Some credit him with transforming "a mildly successful off-Broadway musical into a Broadway hit".

O'Horgan said that the experience gave him the opportunity to help create "a theater form whose demeanor, language, clothing, dance, and even its name accurately reflect a social epoch in full explosion". He believed that the actors in Hair, some from "right off the street", made an important contribution to Broadway theater. He said that "the kids are talking their own language, they're expressing their real sex attitudes and they're laying it on the line about race and miscegenation. The kids on stage are authentic and people sense this." Of its wider impact, he contentiously stated that "Hair is an assault on the theatrical dead area: Broadway. It's almost an effort to give Broadway mouth-to-mouth resuscitation."

==== Lenny and Jesus Christ Superstar ====
The next Broadway project for O'Horgan was to direct the Julian Barry play Lenny, with Cliff Gorman as controversial comedian-satirist Lenny Bruce. Lenny opened at the Brooks Atkinson Theatre in May 1971, across the street from the Biltmore Theater where Hair was still running. The play followed Bruce's nightclub career through run-ins with the police and the courts, and put the same language on a Broadway stage that had gotten Bruce—who died in 1966—arrested in nightclubs just a few years earlier. Lenny ran on Broadway for 453 performances until June 1972 and won Gorman a Tony for best actor in a play.

That same year O'Horgan would also direct the 1971 Andrew Lloyd Webber musical Jesus Christ Superstar that became popular with audiences and that, like Hair, would later be made into a movie. Superstar was notable for the performance of Ben Vereen as Judas Iscariot – whom O'Horgan directed previously on Broadway in the role of Hud in Hair. According to playwright Robert Patrick, O'Horgan didn't want to accept the job but relented finally because he said "Bob ... You wouldn't believe the money they just offered me."

==== Other Broadway work ====
Additional Broadway directing credits include the Tony Award-winning Inner City (1971), a musical conceived by O'Horgan based on controversial poetry book The Inner City Mother Goose by Eve Merriam; the musical Dude (1972), written by Hair author Gerome Ragni with music by Hair composer Galt MacDermot; The Leaf People (1975), a Joe Papp-produced play by Dennis Reardon depicting the first contact by white men with a hostile tribe of Amazonian Indians; and I Won't Dance (1981), a murder whodunit play by Oliver Hailey. At one point in 1971, there were four simultaneous O'Horgan-directed productions on Broadway – Hair, Jesus Christ Superstar, Lenny, and Inner City.

=== Film ===
O'Horgan directed and composed the score for the screen adaptation of Futz with Frederic Forrest, Sally Kirkland, and Jennifer O'Neill, and directed the film version of Eugène Ionesco's Rhinoceros starring Zero Mostel, Gene Wilder, and Karen Black (and which featured a score by Hair composer Galt MacDermot). O'Horgan composed the score for Paul Mazursky's Alex in Wonderland starring Donald Sutherland and Ellen Burstyn. In addition, he is credited with "stage production conceived and adapted by" for the 1978 Sgt. Pepper's Lonely Hearts Club Band film.

=== Awards ===
O'Horgan won three Drama Desk Awards for his direction of Lenny and off-Broadway plays Futz! (1969), and Tom Paine (1968), and was also named Theatrical Director of the Year by Newsweek in 1968. He was awarded the 1967 Obie Award for best off-off-Broadway director of the year and the 1968 Brandeis Award for Creative Arts. In 1969 he was nominated for a Tony Award for best director of a musical for Hair but lost out to Peter Hunt who directed 1776.

In 2006 Ben Vereen presented O'Horgan with the Artistic Achievement Award from the New York Innovative Theatre Awards. This honor was bestowed to O'Horgan on behalf of his peers and fellow artists "in recognition of his significant artistic contributions to the Off-Off-Broadway community". When receiving the honor O'Horgan said "I'm in love with this whole game."

== Personal life ==
O'Horgan lived in a 3,000-square-foot (280 m^{2}) loft in Manhattan at 840 Broadway (at 13th Street) that was famous for parties and events attended by artistic figures like Norman Mailer and Beverly Sills. The walls were covered with his impressive collection of unusual musical instruments from throughout the world. His loft was visited by children's television host Fred Rogers on a 1985 episode of Mister Rogers' Neighborhood. Many instruments were displayed in order of their history, from antique to current. There was also an alcove of gongs, including the one used in Jesus Christ Superstar. He and his friends rang in many a New Year there, where at midnight everyone would take an instrument off the wall, or find a drum or a gong, and celebrate with an abandon and joy that O'Horgan so often set the stage for (both personally and professionally). He also held the weddings of two close friends there. Martha Wingate married Hunt Taylor there in 1980, and Soni Moreno married Harry Primeau there a few years later.

Tom O'Horgan was the initial representation of a father figure to one underaged John Galen McKinley, aka. Jack McKinley who dropped out of high school and ran away from home in the rural Maryland to the big city when he was only 16 years old. It was Tom O'Horgan with whom young and handsome McKinley found not just lodging but also homosexual love after arriving alone and virtually broke in New York's Greenwich Village. The 16 year old lived with O'Horgan only for a few weeks, when he met the famous Harvey Milk and moved into his apartment only 3 weeks later to begin a brand new homosexual love affair. O'Horgan and Jack McKinley got together multiple times later in life. It was before Tom O'Horgan even set foot on Broadway and just started producing experimental plays in his Lower East Side loft and at Ellen Stewart's emerging Cafe La Mama, that McKinley was tending to the technical aspect of theater and learning the basics of stage managing. Harvey Milk would occasionally loan some money to Tom O'Horgan to encourage him to be more ambitious and take on a major production. At that time O'Horgan, McKinley, and Harvey Milk became an indivisible trio: the teenaged high school dropout, the avant-garde director, and a Wall Street businessman. By the time Tom's first Broadway musical "Hair" was being produced, Jack was hired as stage manager for the show, as well as other famous shows of Tom O'Horgan played from New York to California, including the world renowned and controversial "Jesus Christ Superstar".

In his later years O'Horgan suffered from Alzheimer's disease. The disease began to show signs in 2002 and by 2007 he was deeply in debt and unable to care for himself. He came under the care of friends Marc and Julia Cohen, his loft and collections of instruments were sold, and he moved to Venice, Florida, where he died on January 11, 2009. A small group of close friends scattered his ashes in San Francisco Bay, where they had scattered the ashes of his lifelong friends Harvey Milk and Galen McKinley years before. He was 84 years old.

== Bibliography ==
- Horn, Barbara Lee (1991). The Age of Hair: Evolution and the Impact of Broadway's First Rock Musical. New York. ISBN 0-313-27564-5.
