= Paul Foster (playwright) =

American theatre director, producer and playwright (1931–2021)

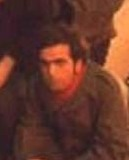
- Foster in 1966
- Born: October 15, 1931; Penns Grove, New Jersey
- Died: March 5, 2021 (aged 89)
- Occupation: Playwright
- Writing career
- Genre: Theatre

Paul Roose-Evans Foster (October 15, 1931 – March 5, 2021) was an American playwright, theater director, and producer born in Penns Grove, New Jersey. He was a founding member and the first president of La MaMa Experimental Theatre Club.

== Early life ==
Foster studied journalism at Rutgers University then moved to Manhattan at the age of 21 to study law at New York University School of Law. After serving in the Navy for two years, Foster developed an interest in theatre. While living in New York, he met Ellen Stewart, a fashion designer planning to open her own boutique. In 1962, Foster agreed to help Stewart with her boutique in exchange for using the basement space as a theater in the evenings. "...Stewart's enthusiasm for the theater project quickly eclipsed her own initial idea for the boutique", and La MaMa was born. The theater moved around Manhattan's East Village multiple times before settling into its current space at 74A East Fourth Street in 1969.

== Career ==
Foster has written eighteen plays, including Elizabeth I and Satyricon (1972), as well as the libretto and lyrics for the musical Silver Queen Saloon (1978). Fourteen books of his plays have been published.

Foster has won numerous awards, including Rockefeller and Guggenheim Fellowships, National Endowment for the Arts, and a British Arts Council Award.

== Selected works and credits ==
- Before Breakfast (1962; La MaMa)
- Hurrah for the Bridge (1963, 1965; La MaMa)
- The Recluse (1964; La MaMa)
- Que Viva El Puente (1964; La MaMa)
- Balls (1964, 1966; La MaMa)
- The Recluse (1965; La MaMa)
- Balm in Gilead (1965; La MaMa; written by Lanford Wilson and directed by Marshall W. Mason; Foster on tech)
- The Madonna in the Orchard (1965, 1966; La MaMa; written by Foster, directed by Tom O'Horgan)
- The Hessian Corporal (1966; La MaMa; written by Foster, directed by Tom O'Horgan)
- Tom Paine (Part 1) (1967; La MaMa; written by Foster, directed by Tom O'Horgan)
- Dead And Buried (1967)
- Heimskringla! or The Stoned Angels (1968; National Educational Television)
- Four Noh Plays by Tom Eyen (1969; La MaMa; written and directed by Tom Eyen; presented as part of Ruth Yorck Golden Series)
- Sprint Orgasmics (1969; La MaMa)
- Caution: A Love Story (1969; La MaMa)
- Heimskringla (1970; La MaMa)
- La Reclusa (1970; La MaMa)
- La MaMa Christmas Show (1971; La MaMa; directed by Robert Patrick)
- Satyricon (1972; La MaMa; written by Foster, performed by John Vaccaro's Playhouse of the Ridiculous)
- Thoughts (1972; La MaMa)
- Elizabeth I (1972)
- Play-by-Play (1972; Christmas show; La MaMa; directed by Robert Patrick)
- Silver Queen (1973; La MaMa; written by Foster, directed by Robert Patrick)
- Rags To Riches To Rags (1974; La MaMa)
- Marcus Brutus (1975)
- Zainamoh (1976; La MaMa)
- Da Nutcracker In Da Bronx (1977; La MaMa)
- Silver Queen Saloon (1978; La MaMa)
- Elisabeta I (1979; La MaMa; written by Foster, directed by Liviu Cielei)
- A Kiss Is Just A Kiss (1980)
- Hurrah for the Bridge (1981; La MaMa; written by Foster, directed by Tom O'Horgan)
- Tom Paine (1983; La MaMa)
- The Dark And Mr. Stone; Part 2, Murder in the Magnolias (1985; La MaMa)
- Faith, Hope and Charity (1986)
- As Straight as a Corkscrew (1995)
- Kisses, Bites and Scratches (2010)
- The Kleenex Planet (date unknown)
