= Joel Gersmann =

American dramatist

Joel Gersmann (August 26, 1942 – June 24, 2005) was an American playwright of experimental theatre. During his 35 years as artistic director at Broom Street Theater, Gersmann was fearless in the subject matter of his plays, with no regard to the reactions of politicians, his audience, or granting organizations. He did, however, receive consistent support from the National Endowment for the Arts from 1973 through 1990, was awarded grants from the Rockefeller Foundation, and obtained financial support from numerous state and local arts organizations. Many authors, playwrights, and actors have credited Gersmann as a major influence in their work. The Wisconsin Center for Film and Theater Research at the Wisconsin State Historical Society houses a collection of Gersmann's manuscripts and papers. He is the subject of the 2012 documentary film Filthy Theater.

== Biography ==
=== Early life and education ===
Joel Gersmann was born in Brooklyn, New York on August 26, 1942, to John and Irma Gersmann. When he was one, his family left New York City for Clifton, New Jersey, where his sister Gayle was born in 1945. The family moved once again to Passaic, New Jersey in 1954, where Gersmann spent the remainder of his childhood, graduating from Passaic High School in 1960. He entered Rutgers University as an accounting major in 1960, switched to English, and finally settled on the study of theater, earning his undergraduate degree in 1964 and MFA from Adelphi University in 1966. Gersmann was strongly influenced by professor Jacques Burdick while at Adelphi. Gersmann then served two years in the US Army as a sergeant, and managed the Post Movie Theater in Fort Monroe, Virginia. After trying his hand for a few months as a newspaper reporter, Gersmann reconnected with Professor Burdick (who had received his PhD from UW-Madison), and was persuaded to study Asian theater under A.C. Scott in a doctoral program at the UW.

=== Career and artistic works ===
Gersmann's directorial debut was with Quixote literary magazine, starting with Under Milk Wood, which included André DeShields in the cast. After several productions with Quixote, Gersmann was invited to direct Broom Street Theater's second show, Woycek, which opened in July 1969. He directed two more plays for Broom Street in 1969, and by June 1970 assumed the role of artistic director.

By the fall of 1970, he terminated his academic career, after passing his preliminaries, to devote all his time to creating theater and writing. He toured several Broom Street productions, expanded beyond theater to write a book of poetry, create theater with high school students at Freedom House, shoot 16 mm film, record television/video productions, and produce radio dramas. In November 1978, Gersmann directed a radio play for an episode of the NPR series "Ear Play". The episode was "The Stolen Jew", written by Jay Neugeboren. Some of his longer term interests included writing poetry reviews, and a lifelong passion for opera and classical music, exemplified in several years of opera programming on local radio station WORT.

However, by late 1976, Gersmann abandoned many of these side projects to focus on purchasing a building for Broom Street Theater, which he accomplished in the fall of 1977. With the theater owning its own space, Gersmann settled into a pattern of writing and directing three to four out of Broom Street's seven annual theatrical productions per year, for the next twenty years. During this period, he also managed the day-to-day operations of the theater, and mentored other local playwright/directors. By 1997, Gersmann was able to reduce his own output to one or two original works per season, due to Broom Street's increasing pool of creative talent.

Gersmann was also a longtime contributing writer for Madison's alternative weekly newspaper Isthmus, for which he wrote classical album reviews and other pieces since 1976, the paper's first year of existence.

=== Final years ===
Gersmann, left, as Harry Hay

From 1998 until his death, Gersmann studied ancient Greek, and made his own translations into English of the Iliad and the Odyssey. His wide-ranging interest in poetry, music, and literature continued at this time in his life, and the booklist reviews he wrote for Isthmus since the early 80s kept on until his death. Gersmann had an encyclopedic knowledge of jazz and classical music recordings. He meticulously acquired an enormous collection of CDs.

After being misdiagnosed with asthma for years (an illness which was the topic and title of one of his plays), Gersmann suffered a heart attack in the summer of 2002, which was the first year he did not produce an original play since 1968. His final two original works debuted in 2003, part of his biographical series of plays, the first on sexologist Alfred Kinsey, and the second on the economist John Maynard Keynes. His final acting role was his portrayal of Harry Hay in Callen Harty's original play Radical Harry in January 2005.

On June 24, 2005, Gersmann died of congestive heart failure, at the age of 62. From 1968 until his death, he directed 114 plays, 88 of them original works.

== Quotes ==
- "Theater is dead!"
- "I want to start with art and work towards trash."
- "I'm trying to figure out how much not to write."
- "It's so trashy, I love it!"
- "Keep it!"
- "The play just died, people!"
- "I don't believe in happiness."
- "Brahms goes well with dopiness"

== Influences and style ==
Gersmann's theatrical style was minimalist in terms of props and costumes, with a strong emphasis on movement and physicality. Vsevolod Meyerhold of the Moscow Art Theater was his hero and a major influence. Gersmann's aesthetic can be traced to the influence of his mentor, Jacques Burdick, professor of Theater at Adelphi University. Burdick, in turn, was influenced by Jerzy Grotowski.

Starting with his very early work, Gersmann wrote his plays during the rehearsal process, tailoring the script to the abilities of his cast. The emphasis on physicality was described by Gersmann as his kinoplastic aesthetic, where, in order to enable rapid scene changes, cast members would portray set pieces and scenery. For many years, Gersmann often refused to allow intermissions for any of the shows performed at Broom Street Theater, and he himself rarely used them. In shows he directed, Gersmann would only permit the cast a curtain call on closing night.

== Reception ==
One constant throughout Gersmann's career was negative critical response. Although acclaim was not uncommon, his productions were often criticized for being too long, with unpolished writing, actors screaming their lines, and repeating themes ad nauseam, both in specific plays, and in his work as a whole. At the same time, the physicality and energy in his plays were seen as inspired, which drew a steady flow of new actors and directors. In the more metropolitan areas where Broom Street toured, reviews were often positive. Gersmann was recognized nationally as a pioneer of experimental theater. Megan Terry, of The Open Theater in New York, and Magic Theater in Omaha, said, "Joel is nationally recognized. We bring his productions here, and our audiences love him."

== See also ==
- Broom Street Theater
