= Ann McMillan =

American composer and broadcaster (1923–1994)

- Born: Ann Endicott McMillan; March 23, 1923; New York City, U.S.
- Died: September 29, 1994 (aged 71); New York City, U.S.
- Education: Bennington College
- Occupations: Composer; broadcaster
- Awards: MacDowell Colony Fellow (1970, 1973, 1977, and 1982); Guggenheim Fellowship (1972)
- Musical career
- Genres: Avant-garde; Musique concrète
- Instrument: Magnetic tape
- Label: Folkways

Ann Endicott McMillan (March 23, 1923 – September 29, 1994) was an American avant-garde composer and broadcaster. Born in New York City and educated at Bennington College, she was working as a music editor when she met Edgard Varèse. The two collaborated, including on his Déserts composition, and they both worked abroad with Pierre Schaeffer in Paris while she was a Fulbright Fellow. Returning to the United States, she had a career as a radio producer and executive, including as a program director for Radiodiffusion-Télévision Française and as the music director of radio station WBAI.

In the late-1960s, she began her career as a music composer, with her instruments including her preferred magnetic tape and recordings of nature sounds, and she released two albums with Folkways Records. Among her awards were a Guggenheim Fellowship and four MacDowell Colony Fellowships, as well as several residencies and grants.

== Early life and career ==
Ann Endicott McMillan was born in March 23, 1923 in New York City. She was the daughter of Dorothy York (née Wadhams) and Andrew McMillan. She was later raised in New England, England, and Wisconsin.

After spending a year at the National Orchestral Association training orchestra, McMillan obtained her BA (1945) from Bennington College, where she was a major in composition and French horn. She was trained in each field by Otto Luening and Joseph Singer, respectively, and she studied at the Martha Graham School of Contemporary Dance as an assistant of Louis Horst. In 1949, she began working with RCA Victor, where she started RCA Red Seal Records' LP records program. Other work she did as music editor included Talking Book Studios, the American Foundation for the Blind, and Columbia Masterworks Records.

== Edgard Varèse and radio career ==
In 1953, McMillan was introduced by sculptor Raymond Puccinelli to Edgard Varèse after the latter needed someone to use a tape recorder he had received. From that year until 1955, she worked for Varèse as an assistant and creative collaborator, assisting him with the Ampex tape recorder used in Déserts. She subsequently developed a friendship with Varèse, often visiting his house to eat dinner. After working as a radio producer for Lively Arts in 1955, she moved to Paris as a Fulbright Fellow that year, remaining there until 1957. During her time abroad, she worked on musique concrète with Pierre Schaeffer at Radiodiffusion-Télévision Française's Club d'Essai studio in Paris, with Varèse also doing work with him. She later operated the tape recorder at Déserts' American premiere at the Vermont National Guard Armory in Bennington, Vermont at the invitation of Bennington College president Frederick Burkhardt, later recalling that the venue "was jammed". (Note: Although McMillan recalled that she "played the tape recorder" at the premiere, the concert's program credits her as sound technician.) Paul Boepple of the Bennington Banner praised her for "[doing] nobly at the Ampex controls".

McMillan remained with the RTF after her return to the United States, particularly as one of their program directors in New York City from 1958 to 1962. In 1964, she began working as the music director of New York City radio station WBAI. In 1965, McMillan did an interview of Yoko Ono as part of the former's job; the two became close after Ono and her husband Anthony Cox worked as volunteers at a benefit concert organized by the station in The Town Hall, though McMillan was reportedly appalled by Ono and Cox's poor living conditions while visiting their home. At one point McMillan asked them to "give [their daughter Kyoko Chan Cox] to someone who loves her". According to John Cage scholar James Pritchett, McMillan was "a sensitive and creative producer" at WBAI.

Outside of WBAI, McMillan was also a producer for the Iran Government Information Center and a freelance writer for the Canadian Broadcasting Corporation and Voice of America.

== Composition career ==
In 1968, McMillan left WBAI to focus more on music composition, and she worked as a composer at the Electronic Music Center in Columbia University in 1972 and was part of The Open Theater. That same year, she was awarded a Guggenheim Fellowship, and she composed the electronic music soundtrack for Open Theater alumnus Megan Terry's play Choose a Spot on the Floor at the Omaha Magic Theatre, whose producer JoAnn Schmidman was also an Open Theater alumnus. She was a music composition fellow of the MacDowell Colony four times, in 1970, 1973, 1977, and 1982; during her third stay there, she would record sounds of animals and nature within the woods around the area for her work. She was awarded a 1979 Rockefeller Foundation fellowship to "to enable her to devote time to her creative work in music". She was also a 1978 Ossabaw Island Project fellow and 1981 Virginia Center for the Arts fellow, and she received a Creative Artists Public Service grant in 1972 and two New York City Department of Cultural Affairs Urban Corps grants in 1975 and 1978.

McMillan's music was characterized as musique concrète. She would either record her own nature sounds or use existing archival recordings, before combining them with traditional instruments or vocals, and her main instrument was magnetic tape. Tom Johnson said of her music in a 1974 review (Note: As he noted in the review, Johnson could not attend her live performances at The Kitchen but was able to listen to some of her compositions while she was preparing.) for The Village Voice: "all of McMillan's materials [...] are altered almost beyond recognition. It's a little like what happens to visual images when they get transformed into a Klee or a de Kooning"; he also noted that McMillan "has a sensitive ear" and praised her use of electronic techniques as "sophisticated enough", but criticized the long length and timidness, and felt that "the musical potential in this area is great enough to justify far more".

In 1979, Folkways Records released McMillan's debut album, Gateway Summer Sounds, blending natural world sounds with human instruments. Another release, Whale – Wail, In Peace, En Paix: For Voice and Tape Structures of Whale and Other Animal Sounds (1986), was commissioned by Folkways founder Moses Asch and combines animal sounds with six verses of human dialogue. Other musicians she collaborated with were Manuel Enríquez, Jane and Jeffrey Hollander, Max Lifchitz, Joel Thome's Orchestra of Our Time, and Quintet of the Americas, the last of whom recalled that she was "a good friend of [theirs]". She was also the composer for the Norwegian documentary Rhino Safari.

McMillan's work was performed at the 13th Annual Avant Garde Festival in 1977 and the Camden Festival in 1979.

McMillan was an American Composers Forum advisor and a member of the MacDowell Colony Board of Directors. She also did lectures and workshops at universities and other institutions, namely New York University (1967), Columbia University (1974), the Metropolitan Museum of Art (1974), her alma mater Bennington College (1978), and McGill University (1981). She later started serving as a guest editor of Contemporary Music Review in 1990; she had planned to guest edit their special issue on Edgard Varèse, but died before she could do so. (Note: This issue finally came to fruition in 2004, with Stephen Davismoon being the guest editor.)

== Legacy and death ==
In 1979, Jeannie G. Pool cited McMillan as one of eight "respected [women] electronic music composers". Elizabeth Hinkle-Turner called McMillan a pioneer for women in electroacoustic music in the United States.

McMillan, a resident of Greenwich Village, died on September 29, 1994, in the Village Nursing Home in New York City. A year after McMillan's death, the Electronic Music Foundation started an archive on her work during its first year of operation. Her archives are at the Michelle Smith Performing Arts Library in the University of Maryland Libraries.
