= Dan Sullivan (critic) =

American theater critic

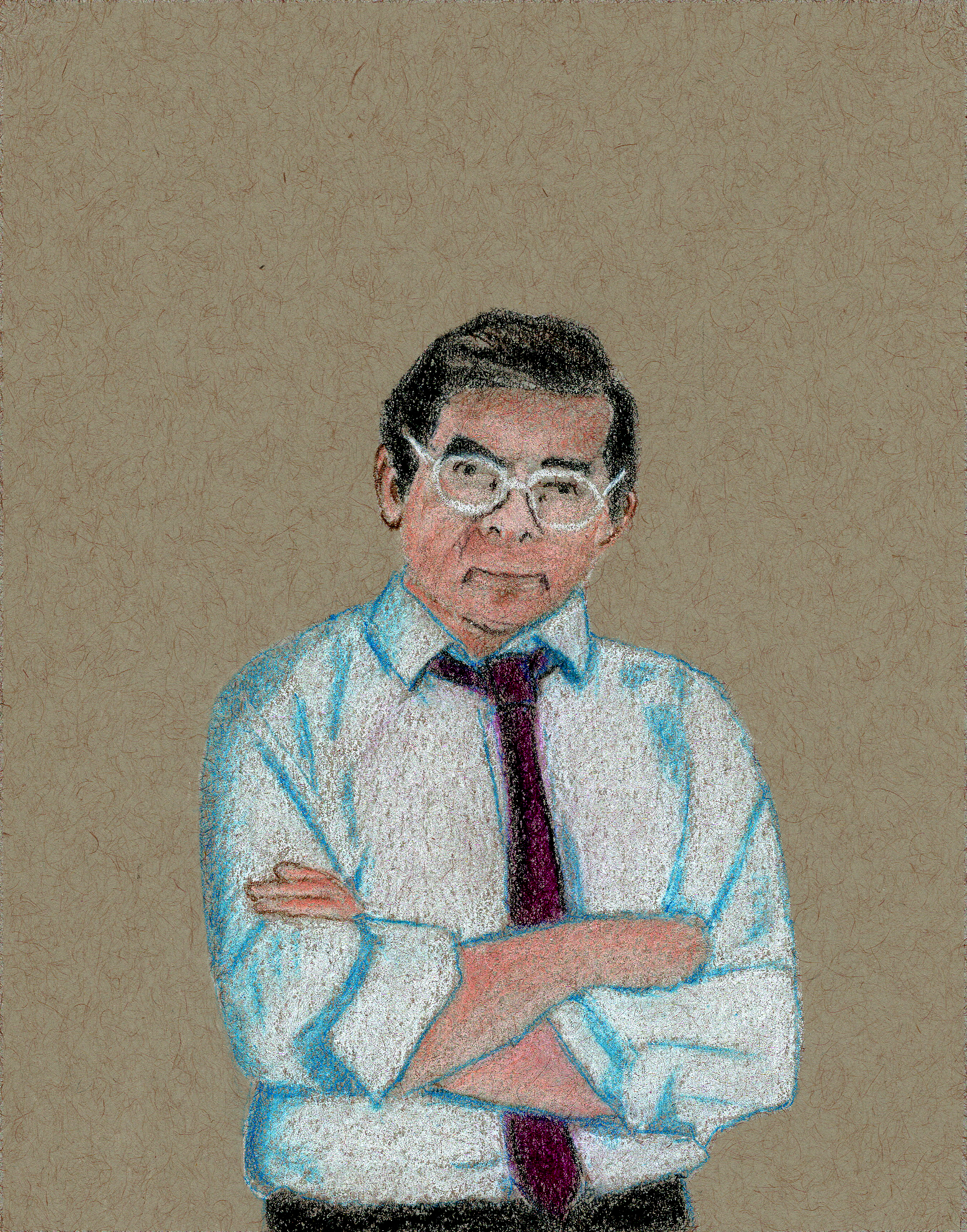
- Born: October 22, 1935; Worcester, Massachusetts, U.S.
- Died: October 4, 2022 (aged 86)
- Education: College of the Holy Cross (BA); University of Southern California
- Occupations: Writer, critic, journalist
- Spouse: Faith Sullivan (m. 1965)
- Children: 3
- Writing career
- Genre: Theater criticism

Dan Sullivan (October 22, 1935 – October 4, 2022) was an American theater critic with columns in the Los Angeles Times, The New York Times, The Minneapolis Tribune, and the St. Paul Pioneer Press. He was the director of the Eugene O'Neill National Critics Institute, and co-founded the American Theater Critics Association. He was a founding member of Brave New Workshop, which for more than half a century continues to be a theater venue for satiric comedy in Minneapolis.

== Biography ==
Sullivan was born in Worcester, Massachusetts, where he graduated from the College of the Holy Cross. He then attended graduate school, and later became a journalism professor at the University of Minnesota. He studied music at the University of Southern California, and then at Stanford University, where he studied under Virgil Thompson.

In 1965 Sullivan married Faith Sullivan, an author, who has won the Midwest Book Award, the Langum Prize for Historical Fiction, the Milkweed National Fiction Prize and the Ben Franklin Prize, and is a Minnesota Book Award Finalist. Her novels include: Good Night, Mr. Wodehouse (2015), Gardenias (2005), What a Woman Must Do (2002), The Empress of One (1997), The Cape Ann (1988), Mrs. Demming and The Mythical Beast (1986), Watchdog (1982) and Repent, Lanny Merkel (1981). They have three children.

Sullivan appeared as himself as a theater critic during a talk show on an episode of The Odd Couple television show. Critic John Simon and author Neil Simon also appeared on the show as themselves.

== Career ==
Sullivan had a theater column in Minneapolis at a significant moment of the city's cultural history — the arrival of the Guthrie Theater. Sullivan witnessed and reported the birth of the theater itself, with its innovative design, and the founding tenure of artistic director Tyrone Guthrie.

At the New York Times, Sullivan was a theater and music critic. His focus was off-Broadway, which included for example, his reporting on The Open Theater on the pioneering Cafe Cino, after the death of its founder, on plays by Edward Albee and Lanford Wilson, on a new play that starred Mildred Dunnock, and on a Broadway production of Hello Dolly that starred Martha Raye.

For the New York Times, he reviewed notable productions of Minneapolis, which included plays from the Guthrie Theater, and more experimental fare, including the Firehouse Theater's production of Jack Jack, by Megan Terry. Sullivan noted:

Yes, there is a nude scene in Jack Jack, and it is far more explicit than anything on the New York stage this season. But at the same time, it is so much like a classical painting come to life — of nymphs and satyrs frolicking on the green — that no one in Minneapolis seems to have objected loudly enough to attract the censors.

In 1969 he became the primary theater critic for the Los Angeles Times when theater there was growing. He kept that post for 22 years. At the end of every year he would write a traditional column summarizing theater's highlights, and he would counter that with a humorous column called "Bah-Humbug Awards", which pointed out some low points. Sullivan would end his Bah-Humbug columns with a confession of mistakes that he himself had made during the year.

=== Brave New Workshop ===
In Minneapolis in 1961, Sullivan, a journalism professor at the University of Minnesota, joined with Dudley Riggs, a former circus aerialist, and others to create a satirical comedy theater and coffee shop. He wrote sketches and plays to be performed by a cast of actors. Sullivan has said it was "the happiest time of my life ... The companionship was wonderful, and it was great to have a gang and something to enjoy doing as a group. As young people, we were living the business life, most of us as journalists, but we also had doubts about it — sketch comedy and satire proved a release for that."

=== A phone call from the President ===
President Ronald Reagan, in 1981, phoned Sullivan, the drama critic of The Los Angeles Times, asking him to give a favorable mention of the musical Turn to the Right, that Reagan's friend, Buddy Ebsen, was starring in. In an article Sullivan quoted the President, who said, "I know this is highly unusual, but I understand Buddy Ebsen has a musical playing out there called Turn to the Right that you wrote a nice review of in the paper. I just wonder if there isn't some way you could let people know that I sure hope it's still playing next time I get home so I can see it." Sullivan said he and the President had a "nice conversation", but that it did become heated. Sullivan replied to the president, "I'm ashamed of you. Here you go around cutting the arts programs, and now you go around plugging a show." The President answered, "I'm rather sorry you feel that way." They went on to discuss how arts programs were funded. Reagan mentioned "boondoggles" that were funded by the National Endowment for the Arts, such as one word poems, and performances staged in laundromats. Sullivan pointed out that there were multi-billion dollar boondoggles in the defense department budget, and the President concurred. The budget for the arts endowment that year was about $165 million. Sullivan mentioned that his original review was not a rave. "It's a pleasantly engendered nostalgic musical that didn't sustain the mood because it was so badly put together," he said. "You can't totally hate it. It's harmless. But you can't constantly eat peach ice cream in the theater without getting sick on it."

== Academic work and conferences ==
Sullivan was devoted to mentoring and teaching theater writers, and was a founding member of the Critics Institute, which in 1968 became part of the annual Playwrights Conference of Eugene O'Neill Theater Center. The conference is a place where playwrights, actors, and directors gather, and where playwrights learn their craft as new plays are read and developed. The Critics Institute was founded with the belief that theater critics played a part in the theatrical experience, and could learn and benefit from the conference experience.

At the first meeting of the Critics Institute, a play was read, and received a negative reaction from one of the critics. This angered the playwright, because he felt his play had been misunderstood. The playwright was also bothered by the fact that Sullivan was taking notes, for his next-day column in The New York Times. In that column, Sullivan would include a description of the critical reactions to the play.

The next session of that inaugural meeting of the Critics Institute involved a different playwright; and it began with the playwright pulling out a gun, pointing it at Sullivan and his fellow critics, and saying that he was "ready for them". This was meant as a joke, though no one laughed. At the end of the 1968 conference the playwrights were united in opposition the inclusion of critics. Things improved as the conference continued to develop and learn, and the Critics Institute was not alone in encountering fraught relationships among the various disciplines in the conference setting. Sullivan was the director of the Critics Institute from 1999 to 2013.

Sullivan co-founded the American Theater Critics Association, and created the organization's statement of purpose: To increase communication among American theater critics, to encourage freedom of expression in the theater and theater criticism, to advance the standards of theater by advancing the standard of theater criticism, to increase public awareness of the theater as an important nation resource, and to "reaffirm the individual critic's right to disagree with his colleagues on all matters including the above". Speaking to the association in 1998, Sullivan said:

I do not believe in pussy willow criticism. The motto of the theater is not "darling, you were wonderful"…If it entails saying no, firmly, that's the job. But I do think it's wise to avoid the gleeful tone of an avenger grinding his enemy, the actor, into the dust…Don't come off as a person whose basic joy is to inflict pain. You don't need to be loved by theater people, but you want to be respected…When it comes to fraternization, aka sleeping with the enemy, there's no right answer. It depends on temperament. Independence is the most important thing for a critic. I remember Brooks Atkinson's rule: "don't go out drinking with John Barrymore." Avoid doing lunches with directors who want to share their "concept" of the piece. It can be too much information. You just want to see the play, and let it happen to you. You're not a collaborator.

Sullivan taught arts reviewing and reporting at the University of Minnesota School of Journalism.
