= 5th Lambda Literary Awards =

1993 literary awards ceremony

The 5th Lambda Literary Awards were held in 1993 to honour works of LGBT literature published in 1992.

== Special awards ==
Category	Winner
Editor's Choice	Richard Mohr, Gay Ideas
Publisher Service	Craig Rodwell, Oscar Wilde Memorial Bookshop

== Nominees and winners ==
Category	Author	Title	Ref.
Children's/Young Adult	Penny Raife Durant	When Heroes Die	Winner
Children's/Young Adult	Joan Alden and Catherine Hopkins	A Boy’s Best Friend	Finalist
Children's/Young Adult	Bette Greene	Drowning of Stephan Jones	Finalist
Children's/Young Adult	Johnny Valentine and Lynette Schmidt	The Daddy Machine	Finalist
Children's/Young Adult	Johnny Valentine and Lynette Schmidt	The Day They Put a Tax on Rainbows	Finalist
Gay Anthology	John Preston (ed.)	A Member of the Family	Winner
Gay Anthology	Dennis Cooper	Discontents	Finalist
Gay Anthology	John Preston	Flesh and the Word	Finalist
Gay Anthology	Assotto Saint	Here to Dare	Finalist
Gay Anthology	George Stambolian	Men on Men 4	Finalist
Gay Fiction	Randall Kenan	Let the Dead Bury Their Dead	Winner
Gay Fiction	Christopher Bram	Almost History	Finalist
Gay Fiction	Bo Huston	Dream Life	Finalist
Gay Fiction	Jaime Manrique	Latin Moon in Manhattan	Finalist
Gay Fiction	Lev Raphael	Winter Eyes	Finalist
Gay Mystery	Michael Nava	The Hidden Law	Winner
Gay Mystery	Steve Johnson	Final Atonement	Finalist
Gay Mystery	Grant Michaels	Love You to Death	Finalist
Gay Mystery	Richard Stevenson	Third Man Out	Finalist
Gay Mystery	Larry Townsend	One for the Master, Two for the Fool	Finalist
Gay Non-Fiction	Paul Monette	Becoming a Man	Winner
Gay Non-Fiction	John D'Emilio	Making Trouble	Finalist
Gay Non-Fiction	Allen Ellenzweig	Homoerotic Photograph	Finalist
Gay Non-Fiction	Eric Marcus	Making History: The Struggle for Gay and Lesbian Equal Rights, 1945-1990	Finalist
Gay Non-Fiction	Darrell Yates Rist	Heartlands	Finalist
Gay Poetry	Edward Field	Counting Myself Lucky	Winner
Gay Poetry	Tim Dlugos	Strong Place	Finalist
Gay Poetry	Thom Gunn	The Man with Night Sweats	Finalist
Gay Poetry	Essex Hemphill	Ceremonies	Finalist
Gay Poetry	Rudy Kikel	Long Division	Finalist
Gay science fiction, fantasy or horror	Maureen F. McHugh	China Mountain Zhang	Winner
Gay science fiction, fantasy or horror	Poppy Z. Brite	Lost Souls	Finalist
Gay science fiction, fantasy or horror	Lewis Gannett	The Living One	Finalist
Gay science fiction, fantasy or horror	Anne Rice	The Tale of the Body Thief	Finalist
Gay science fiction, fantasy or horror	Thomas T. Thomas	Cry Gender	Finalist
Humor	Alison Bechdel	Dykes to Watch Out For: The Sequel	Winner
Humor	Jane Caminos	That’s Ms. Bulldyke to You, Charlie	Finalist
Humor	Rupert Kinnard	BB and the Diva	Finalist
Humor	Andrea Natalie	The Night Audrey’s Vibrator Spoke	Finalist
Humor	Eric Orner	The Mostly Unfabulous Social Life of Ethan Green	Finalist
Lesbian Anthology	Joan Nestle	The Persistent Desire	Winner
Lesbian Anthology	Tee Corinne	Poetry of Sex	Finalist
Lesbian Anthology	Katherine V. Forrest and Barbara Grier	Erotic Naiad	Finalist
Lesbian Anthology	Anne MacKay	Wolf Girls at Vassar	Finalist
Lesbian Anthology	Anita L. Pace	Write from the Heart	Finalist
Lesbian Fiction	Judith Katz	Running Fiercely Toward a High Thin Sound	Winner
Lesbian Fiction	Carol Anshaw	Aquamarine	Finalist
Lesbian Fiction	Madelyn Arnold	On Ships at Sea	Finalist
Lesbian Fiction	Rebecca Brown	Terrible Girls	Finalist
Lesbian Fiction	Sarah Schulman	Empathy	Finalist
Lesbian Mystery	Jaye Maiman	Crazy for Loving	Winner
Lesbian Mystery	Elizabeth Pincus	Two-Bit Tango	Winner
Lesbian Mystery	Nikki Baker	Lavender House Murder	Finalist
Lesbian Mystery	Ellen Hart	Stage Fright	Finalist
Lesbian Mystery	J.M. Redmann	Deaths of Jocasta	Finalist
Lesbian Non-Fiction	Blanche Wiesen Cook	Eleanor Roosevelt	Winner
Lesbian Non-Fiction	Jeanne DuPrau	The Earth House	Finalist
Lesbian Non-Fiction	Carol Givens and L. Diane Fortier	Practicing Eternity	Finalist
Lesbian Non-Fiction	Joan Nestle	Persistent Desire	Finalist
Lesbian Non-Fiction	Robert A. Schanke	Shattered Applause	Finalist
Lesbian Poetry	Audre Lorde	Undersong	Winner
Lesbian Poetry	Lori Anderson	Cultivating Excess	Finalist
Lesbian Poetry	Nancy Boutilier	According to Her Contours	Finalist
Lesbian Poetry	Diane Stein	Lady Sun, Lady Moon	Finalist
Lesbian Poetry	Terry Wolverton	Black Slip	Finalist
Lesbian science fiction, fantasy or horror	Nicola Griffith	Ammonite	Winner
Lesbian science fiction, fantasy or horror	Judith Katz	Running Fiercely Toward a High Thin Sound	Finalist
Lesbian science fiction, fantasy or horror	Severna Park	Speaking Dreams	Finalist
Lesbian science fiction, fantasy or horror	Melissa Scott	Dreamships	Finalist
Lesbian science fiction, fantasy or horror	Jean Stewart	Return to Isis	Finalist
Small Press	David Wojnarowicz	Memories That Smell Like Gasoline	Winner
Small Press	Natalie Barney	A Perilous Advantage	Finalist
Small Press	Jyl Lynn Felman	Hot Chicken Wings	Finalist
Small Press	Michael Rumaker	To Kill a Cardinal	Finalist
Small Press	Assotto Saint	Here to Dare	Finalist
