= Judith Katz =

American playwright and novelist (1951-)

- Born: 1951 (age 74–75); Worcester, Massachusetts
- Known for: American playwright

Judith Katz (born 1951) is an American playwright, thespian, and novelist. Her debut novel, Running Fiercely Toward a High Thin Sound (1992), won a Lambda Literary Award for Lesbian Fiction.

== Early life and education ==
Judith Katz was born in 1951 in Worcester, Massachusetts, where she grew up in a traditional Jewish family.

She graduated with a bachelor's in English from the University of Massachusetts Amherst in 1973. While at UMass Amherst, she experienced homophobia at the student women's center, which led her to come out as a lesbian by publishing the article "Hard Ass Dyke Tells All" in the school newspaper.

== Career ==
Katz is known for her work as a playwright, novelist, and theater-maker. Katz's writing frequently features lesbian and Jewish characters, including in both of her novels.

Her first full-length play was The Franny Chicago Play, which was originally produced in 1973. The play explores the relationships among three lesbian women, two of whom are grappling with the third's suicide.

Later in 1973, she moved to Omaha, Nebraska, where she worked with the Magic Theatre as a playwright-in-residence, technician, producer, and performer until 1977.

In 1977, she returned to western Massachusetts, where she obtained a master's in theater from Smith College in 1979 and co-founded the Chrysalis Theatre Eclectic. For her master's thesis, she wrote Tribes: A Play of Dreams, a family drama with allusions to women's history.

Katz moved to Minneapolis, Minnesota, in 1983 to work with the feminist theater group At the Foot of the Mountain. While with the group, she wrote and performed in plays such as The Monster in My Mother's House.

In 1992, she published her first novel, Running Fiercely Toward a High Thin Sound. The book tells the story of a woman named Nadine Pagan as she deals with her difficult Jewish family and settles in a lesbian Jewish community known as New Chelm, featuring references to Jewish mysticism, including the dybbuk of Jewish folklore. It won the Lambda Literary Award for Lesbian Fiction the following year.

Her next novel, The Escape Artist, was released in 1997. A historical novel set in early 20th-century Poland and Argentina, it follows a Jewish lesbian girl navigating the underworld of Buenos Aires. It was a finalist for the 1998 Stonewall Book Award for Literature.

From the early 1980s until her retirement in 2020, she also worked as an adjunct and academic advisor for the Departments of English and Gender, Women & Sexuality Studies at the University of Minnesota. She also taught at the Loft Literary Center and as an adjunct at the Minneapolis College of Art and Design, Hamline University, and Macalester College. Additionally, Katz has long been involved in lesbian feminist and peace organizing.

Her papers are held as part of the Jean-Nickolaus Tretter Collection in Gay, Lesbian, Bisexual and Transgender Studies at the University of Minnesota Libraries.
