= Martha Boesing =

American theater director and playwright

Martha Boesing (born January 24, 1936) is an American theater director and playwright. She was the founding artistic director of the Minneapolis experimental feminist theater collective At the Foot of the Mountain.

== Early life and education ==
Martha Boesing (née Gross) was born in Exeter, New Hampshire in 1936 and graduated from Abbot Academy in Andover, Massachusetts. She had her first experience making theater at sixteen, as an apprentice for a local summer stock company. Boesing graduated from Connecticut College for Women in 1957, and received an M.A. in English Literature from the University of Wisconsin in 1958. She married Paul Boesing, with whom she has three children; they divorced in 1980.

== Career ==
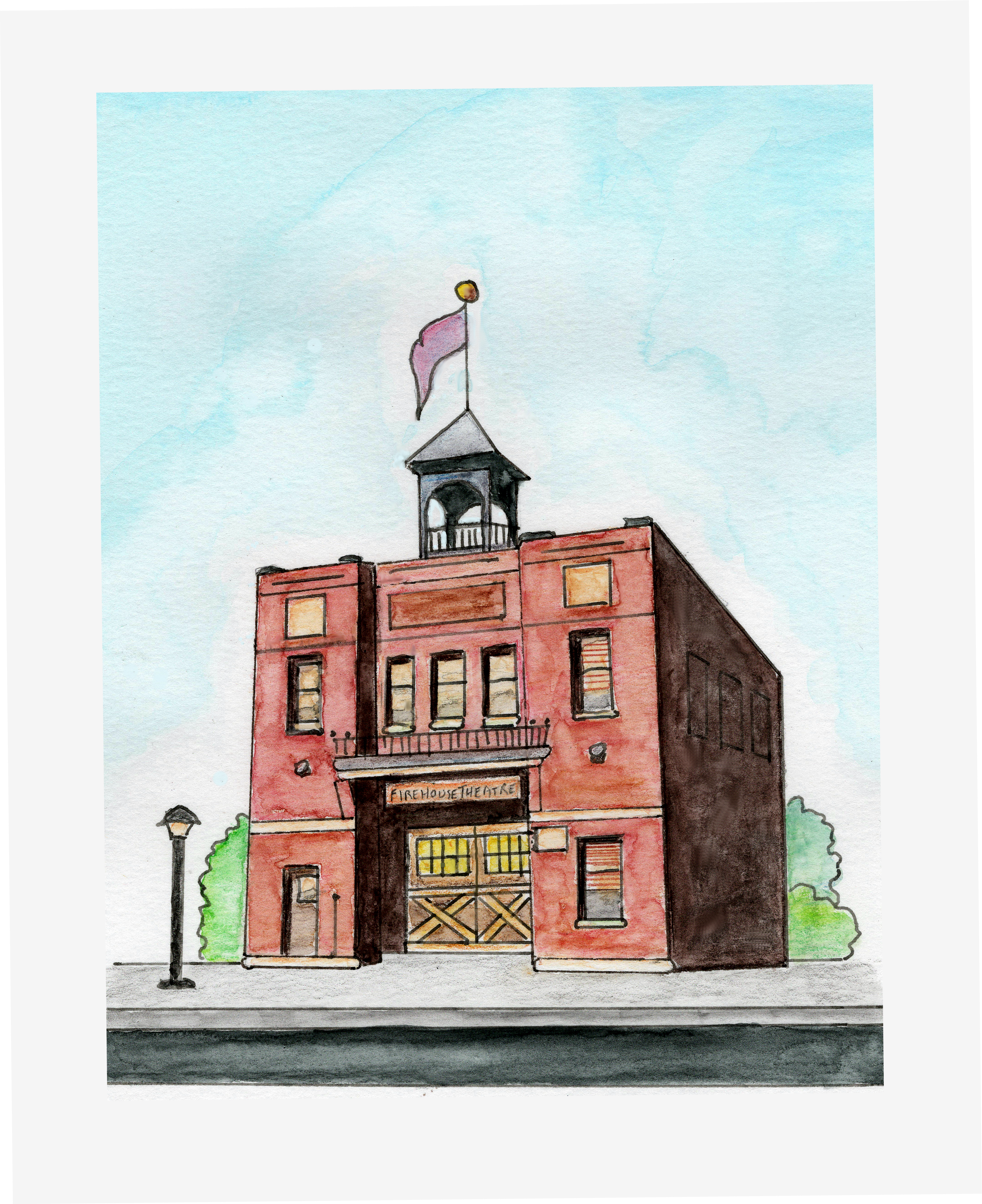
Firehouse Theater in Minneapolis

Boesing began her professional theater career as an actor with the experimental Firehouse Theater in Minneapolis, Minnesota in the 1960s. Her work and artistic interests were heavily influenced by Joseph Chaikin and his New York-based Open Theatre. She spent two years as playwright-in-residence at the Academy Theater in Atlanta before returning to Minneapolis.

In 1974 Boesing co-founded and became artistic director for the women's theater collective At the Foot of the Mountain (AFOM). She led the company for 10 years, developing many of her feminist plays in collaboration with its members. Boesing's work with AFOM used radical feminist analysis to create political theater about rape culture, United States imperialism and neocolonialism, and the Cold War nuclear arms race. She left the company in 1984 as the collective struggled with issues of leadership and hierarchy, as well as criticisms of its lack of inclusivity and white feminist politics.

Boesing worked with several other Minneapolis theaters, including the Minnesota Repertory Company, the Playwrights' Center, In the Heart of the Beast Puppet and Mask Theatre, the Minneapolis Environmental Theatre Project, and the Children's Theatre (formerly the Moppet Players.) As co-director of the Children's Theatre, she became embroiled in the 1984 sex-abuse allegations surrounding the theater's employment of John Clark Donahue, who later pleaded guilty to sexual misconduct with students. In subsequent investigations, Boesing admitted that she had been aware of his history as a known predator when she hired him, and described herself and others in leadership positions as complicit in the crimes because of their choice to remain silent.

Boesing moved to San Francisco in 1984 after receiving a Bush Foundation fellowship grant for $20,000. She has worked with many Bay Area theaters including Eureka Theatre, which produced her play Heart of the World (1990), originally written for A Traveling Jewish Theatre.

Her work continues to focus on political and social issues. Standing on Fishes (1991), which included mask work and audience interactivity, used poetic language and gesture to explore mass extinction from the animals' point of view, decrying the destructive effect humans have had on the global environment. She wrote about homelessness in San Francisco in her 2006 one-woman play Song of the Magpie. Mothers of Ludlow (2010), directed by her daughter Jennifer and scored by her ex-husband Paul, was a work of children's theater about striking coal miners and the Ludlow Massacre.

Boesing lives in Oakland, CA with her partner Sandy Boucher.

== Style ==
Boesing's plays seek to unpack gender roles and frequently center around women's relationships with each other. They are formally fragmented, often allegorical, with ritualistic or mythical overtones and non-linear structures. Boesing's style juxtaposes individual stories about human relationships with global power structures and historical events, exploring the personal and the political in keeping with the concerns of the second-wave feminist movement.

Her experimental background and early experience with the At The Foot of the Mountain collective influenced her collaborative process of play development; Boesing's process rejects the traditional, hierarchical structure of theater making in favor of a more egalitarian, collective practice.

== Awards and publications ==
Boesing won a National Endowment for the Arts playwriting fellowship grant in 1987. She received the Theater Communications Group's Pew Residency Director's Grant in 1996. She was honored with the McKnight Theatre Artist Award in 2001.

Her work has been published in Martha Boesing, Journeys along the Matrix: Three Plays (1978) Her plays have also been anthologized in Slant Six: New Theater for Minneapolis Playwrights Center (1990), A Century of Plays by American Women (1979), and Plays in Process (1981).

== Selected works ==
=== Plays developed with AFOM ===
- River Journal (1975)
- Raped (1976)
- The Moontree (1976)
- The Story of a Mother (1977)
- The Web (1982)
- Ashes, Ashes, We All Fall Down (1982)

=== Regional theater ===
- Standing on Fishes (1991)
- My Other Heart (1993)
- Hard Times Come Again No More (1994)
- These Are My Sisters (1996)
- After Long Silence (1999)
- Song of the Magpie (2006)
- A Place of Her Own (2007)
- Mothers of Ludlow (2010)
