= Punchinello (disambiguation) =

Punchinello may refer to:

- Punchinello, an American satirical magazine
- Pulcinella, the commedia character, and its English descendant, Punch
- Punchinello Players – Student theater at the University of Minnesota, St.Paul Campus for 80 years (1914 – 1994).
- The third main boss in the SNES video game Super Mario RPG
- The main character in Max Lucado's 1997 book, You Are Special and subsequent books about Lucado's fictional society of wooden people called the "Wemmicks"
- The Punchinello crime family and its leader, Don Angelo Punchinello, the main antagonists for the first couple of chapters of the video game Max Payne
- A clown marionette seen in "Grandpa's Magical Toys" (1988), a video in the Wee Sing video series (played by Joel Morello) and "Wee Singdom" (1996), a video in the Wee Sing video series (played by Thom Rivera replacing the 1988 departed Joel Morello for/from playing Punchinello the Clown)
- Zemeros flegyas or Punchinello, a species of butterfly of South Asia
