= Marianne de Pury =

- Born: 3 April 1935 (age 91); St. Gallen, Switzerland
- Education: Geneva Conservatory of Music
- Occupations: Theatre director, manager, composer, translator
- Organization: Yale School of Drama (composer-in-residence)
- Known for: Translator for French playwright Jean Genet
- Notable work: America Hurrah (1966); Viet Rock (1966)

Marianne de Pury (born 3 April 1935) is a Swiss theatre artist and composer born in St. Gallen, Switzerland. She is best known as the musical composer of two 1966 anti-war plays, Jean-Claude van Itallie's social satire America Hurrah and Megan Terry's rock musical Viet Rock.

De Pury studied piano and composition at the Conservatoire de Musique de Genève. She enjoyed the performing arts from a young age and, as a teen, she made frequent trips to Paris to see theatre. Later she moved to New York City, where she studied as an apprentice under the Open Theatre's director Joseph Chaikin. There she forged connections with artists active in New York's avant-garde theatre scene as well as the Black Panther Party.

In 1965 she began a collaborative project with playwright and director Megan Terry who was working on a devised performance piece for the La MaMa Experimental Theatre Club protesting the Vietnam War. Their ensemble improvisations at the Open Theatre laboratory resulted in Viet Rock, widely recognized as the first rock musical written and produced in the United States. De Pury followed the production as an accompanist when it premiered at the Yale Repertory Theatre in 1966 and later transferred to the Off-Broadway Martinique Theatre on 10 November 1966.

During her time in the United States, de Pury also served as composer-in-residence for the Yale School of Drama and worked as a translator for the French playwright Jean Genet.

De Pury is founder of the Santa Fe Ensemble Theatre in New Mexico and has directed free-lance productions in Basel, Bern, Bonn, Dublin, Sarajevo, Melbourne, New York and Cameroun. Upon returning to Switzerland, she became the administrative director of the Theatre de Carouge, a three-stage performing space in Geneva, Switzerland.
