= Punchinello Players =

- Formation: 1914
- Dissolved: 1994
- Type: Theatre group
- Purpose: Student-run Community Theatre
- Location: St. Paul, Minnesota

Punchinello Players, founded in 1914, was a theatre organization of the University of Minnesota. When it closed it was the second oldest student-run community theater in the U.S. Punchinello - located on the St. Paul campus - originated for the purpose of improving the lives of the greater community. As a university-associated theater it changed with the times and continued to explore and interrogate the human condition. Punchinello Players closed in 1994 due primarily to its home, North Hall (formerly the St. Paul Campus Dining Hall), being slated for demolition.

== Debut ==
Back to the Farm

Back to the Farm was a two-year production (1913–1915) written by College of Agriculture student Merline H. Shumway and directed by Estelle Cook, English Instructor at the Agricultural School to create awareness of the university's new Agricultural Extension Program in the rural communities of Minnesota. Back to the Farm was created to demonstrate the value of scientifically trained farmers. It centers around a farm family in which the father is an old-school farmer, who isn't open to his sons' new ideas about how to do things. The son - Merton Merrill - leaves the farm and enrolls at a nearby agricultural college for their 4-year program. They mend their relationship and he returns to the farm, implementing what he's learned - with the result that the farm becomes the most productive in the state. The serious content was balanced by humor provided by the character of 'Gus', who continually threatens to quit, but adopts scientific methods along with Merton. (Note: From notes of a freshman: October 11, 1916. Saw "Back the Farm" in chapel, and nearly died laughing. Ted Thorson as "Gus" is certainly a card.) Initially presented at County Fairs around the state, its popularity exceeded expectations and the play continued to tour at farmers' institutes, other educational sessions and also at social events. It was performed fifty times in the first year and many more times for years afterwards. Follow-up plays including Kindling the Hearth Fire and Partners - written by Shumway, Cook and others, all directed by Cook - were also well received, and in those years through 1922 a set of plays were created, performed and made available in bulletin form for communities to perform themselves. (Note: "The play (‘Back to the Farm’) has been produced in nearly every state of the union and has been put on by the extension division of the University throughout the state".)

The Agricultural Extension Program (along with General Extension, founded 4 years later in 1913) aimed to support Minnesota farming and also increase attendance for the School of Agriculture. That Agricultural School - available to farm community members 16 and older - provided farm instruction and advancement to the College of Agriculture, Forestry and Home Economics for those interested. As a Land-grant university, there was a necessary focus on providing agricultural instruction that met the needs of the State of Minnesota, and getting students in place for that instruction. George Edgar Vincent - University President from 1911 to 1917 - put in place innovative programming including 'University Weeks' with plays, lectures, concerts and debates similar to the Chautauqua Institute he had previously led, in the spirit of increasing educational and cultural opportunities for the general public.

Those initial rural productions of Back to the Farm launched the existence of Punchinello Players in 1914, originally under the name the Minnesota Agriculture Dramatic Club. The organization changed its name to Punchinello Players in 1923. (Note: Punchinello Star and Committee on Sorority Dance: Miss Daane will play a leading role in ‘The Passing of the Third Floor Back’’ which Punchinello, agricultural campus dramatic club, will present Friday and Saturday evenings.) For much of the early decades, all members of Punchinello were students enrolled in the College of Agriculture, Forestry and Home Economics. (Note: Square Crooks was the second production given by Punchinello Players that year (1928-1929), and that was the first time that Punchinello put on a second production in an academic year)

== Background ==
Early in the Twin Cities history (prior to 1900) the only theater available in the area were touring groups, in from the East Coast. The genre was vaudeville, as well as traditional theater. There were also music/performance halls such as Harrison's Hall, Woodman's Hall, the Pence Opera House and the Academy of Music in Minneapolis and the St. Paul Opera House in St. Paul. When Punchinello was formed as the Agricultural Dramatic Club in 1915, it was for a specific University-related purpose, aimed at a specific segment of the community. There were only a few general-audience theater groups operating - primarily the University of Minnesota's Masquers Club and Players Club. Those University groups and others combined to form the University Little Theater when Scott Hall was built in 1921. The State Theatre and the Hennepin Theater, now known as Orpheum opened downtown Minneapolis that same year. In the 1930s, movies and films were more widely available than before. Old Log Theatre started in 1940. The short-lived Circle Theater Players became Theatre in the Round Players in the early 1950s. Tyrone Guthrie came to Minneapolis and founded the Guthrie Theater in 1963. (Note: "..residents of the Twin Cities region participated in amateur theater organizations, attended the commercial Old Log Theater for a range of plays and musicals, and took in challenging fare through student productions at the University of Minnesota.") Amateur theater in the 1960s continued to develop as well, including into experimental, non-commercial work by Firehouse Theater. In the 1970s and early 1980s local theater came to life with the founding of numerous organizations including At the Foot of the Mountain, Children's Theatre Company, Illusion Theater, In the Heart of the Beast, Mixed Blood, Penumbra Theatre Company, Theatre de la Jeune Lune and others.

== Performing Venue ==
=== Touring - Minnesota ===
Punchinello's original production of Back to the Farm was presented on a touring basis around the state, initially at County Fairs and later at various educational sessions and social events. In the early years, the Agricultural Dramatic Club performed around the state. After World War I, those specific activities ended, but Punchinello continued to tour for different reasons over the years.

=== St. Paul Campus ===
==== Auditorium, Temporary Buildings ====
Punchinello Players was based on the St. Paul Campus its whole existence. The organization worked out of various spaces including the Main Building Auditorium and assorted temporary buildings on the St. Paul Campus through till the 1960s.

Besides the Main Building Auditorium, their main location for a period in the 1950s was the 'Punchinello Playhouse' which had room for an audience of 140 in a theater-in-the-round setting, and was situated in a post-war temporary building referred to variously as 'south of Administration' and 'temporary south of Haecker.' Punchinello had no permanent home in all that time.

==== North Hall ====
Punchinello moved into permanent space at North Hall (formerly the St. Paul Campus Dining Hall) in the 1960s, while O. Meredith Wilson was president. Wilson became aware of Punchinello's lack of sufficient support, and he felt that something better could be arranged. Soon, Punchinello had a new home.

The cafeteria area became the stage and audience area with seating for 119. The proctor balcony over the cafeteria became the lighting/sound booth. The green rooms behind the stage were spacious. Rooms on the second floor were used for costumes. A cavernous area in the basement (the dungeon) was used for large and small props and set pieces.

=== Minneapolis Campus ===
Scott Hall on the University of Minnesota Campus East Bank was modern and well-furnished when it was built in 1921, and the Agricultural Dramatic Club, along with the other groups at the time including Masquers, Garrick, the Player, Paint and Patches, and Pi Upsilon Delta all participated in activities there. Originally called the Music building, it housed the University Little Theater, supported by the Music and dramatic departments. Musical productions were also supported by musicians from the twin cities and in particular by members of the Minneapolis Symphony Orchestra. The drama faculty consisted of four people, and the Little Theater annually produced five major shows and various experimental performances. (Note: "The Little Theater appeals to a wide audience aside from that on the campus, for it offers almost the only legitimate theater fare in the Twin Cities, presenting Broadway successes and revivals and the premiere of at least one play each year")In 1923 Punchinello re-established itself on the St. Paul Campus with the name change.

== Chronology ==
The first committed, long-term faculty advisor of Punchinello was William J. Routledge (Rhetoric Professor at the University Farm) who coached the organization from the late 1920s through till the 1940–1941 school year. Performances during this period had varied structures, often featured live musical performances before the show and/or between acts, and productions included actors, faculty, and the Faculty Women's Club. Organizational boundaries were flexible as well - some productions were campus-wide, and students were often active in multiple groups. A production of Kismet in 1925 by the Masquers' included members of multiple theaters, including Players, Paint and Patches, and Punchinello; and production was further aided by members of the Arabs - the engineering dramatic society.

Starting with the 1941–1942 school year, Dr. Francis Drake was faculty advisor and often show director, but Punchinello – like many University organizations – was largely dormant during World War II.

Punchinello's faculty advisor and frequent production director for over three decades was William M. Marchand, humanities professor of the rhetoric department, CFANS. Bill Marchand had a PhD in theatre, and prior to coming to the university in 1960 he had co-founded the Paul Bunyan Theatre, a summer theatre in Bemidji.

== Theater Genre ==
Punchinello mainly performed traditional classics as well as some musicals, and the occasional newer work. Among the rare melodrama/related productions were Kind Lady by Edward Chodorov in 1942, and Dracula (from the novel by Bram Stoker) in 1969. Comedies have included Square Crooks in 1929, Dover Road by A.A. Milne in 1936, Arms and the Man by George Bernard Shaw in 1954, Harvey by Mary Chase in 1958, The Importance of Being Earnest by Oscar Wilde in 1973 and Hay Fever by Noël Coward in 1978. Punchinello received positive reviews for its production of Machiavelli's La Mangragola in 1968. Punchinello produced the metatheatrical play Our Town by Thornton Wilder in 1969.

Punchinello often explored social issues, with sell-out productions such as The Crucible by Arthur Miller and Waiting for Godot by Samuel Beckett in 1964 and in 1983, as well as lesser known works including Play with a Tiger by Doris Lessing in 1979 and Shadow Box by Michael Cristofer in 1982.

The students who were involved were often but not always theater majors, representing the range of disciplines within the university.

== Finale ==
Its final two productions continued that tradition: William Saroyan's The Time of Your Life was the second-to-last production. The final production, directed by William Marchand, was Thornton Wilder's Our Town.

== See also ==
- History of Saint Paul, Minnesota
- Rarig Center
