= Déserts =

Piece by Edgard Varèse

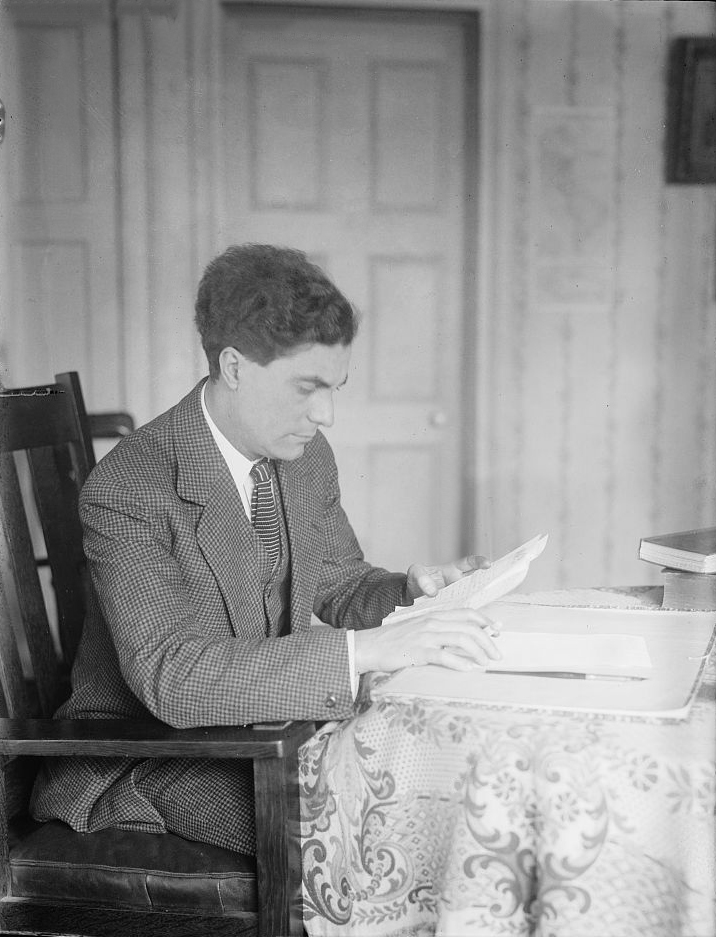
Edgard Varèse, 1915

Déserts (1950–1954) is a piece by Edgard Varèse for 14 winds (brass and woodwinds), 5 percussion players, 1 piano, and electronic tape.

Percussion instruments are exploited for their resonant potential, rather than used solely as accompaniment. According to Varèse, the title of the piece regards "not only physical deserts of sand, sea, mountains, and snow, outer space, deserted city streets… but also distant inner space… where man is alone in a world of mystery and essential solitude."

All those that people traverse or may traverse: physical deserts, on the earth, in the sea, in the sky, of sand, of snow, of interstellar spaces or of great cities, but also those of the human spirit, of that distant inner space no telescope can reach, where one is alone.

— Varèse (1950)

== History ==
The piece was created as a soundtrack of a modernist film. According to "Blue" Gene Tyranny, "It is now recognized as an exceptional example of truly humanistic music." It "has been described… as atonal, athematic,… amotivic," and its orchestration has "been labeled subtle." As Paul Griffiths describes:

The plan of Déserts, unprecedented, was that electronic and orchestral music should be brought face to face: three sequences of 'organized sound' on tape are interpolated into a composition for an orchestra of wind, piano, and percussion. Babbitt has drawn attention to the subtlety with which Varèse assembles timbres from his ensemble, and indeed much of the scoring suggests an almost Webernian care for timbre-melody—something quite new in Varèse's music, the instruments being used for example, to vary the color of the sustained pitches that are stations of polarity in the musical progress.

Varèse began composition in 1953 (or 1952) upon the anonymous gift of an Ampex tape recorder. Through connections in New York City, he met Ann McMillan, a young composer and music editor at RCA Red Seal, who became his assistant; McMillan recorded the sounds of factories and percussion instruments which Varèse would use in this composition. He continued to work on the piece at Pierre Schaeffer's studio at Radiodiffusion-Télévision Française in the late 1950s, and later revised it at the Columbia-Princeton Electronic Music Center in the early 1960s. Dèserts may be performed without the tape sections, reducing its length by seven minutes.

The first performance of the combined orchestral and tape sound composition was given at the Théâtre des Champs-Élysées in Paris on December 2, 1954, with Hermann Scherchen conducting and Pierre Henry in charge of the tape part. This performance was part of an ORTF broadcast concert, in front of a totally unprepared and mainly conservative audience, with Déserts wedged between pieces by Mozart and Tchaikovsky. It received a vitriolic reaction from both the audience and the press. Igor Stravinsky was complimentary of the piece, speaking favourably of the piece's "form based on patterns of recurrence and incidence". Moreover, he appreciated the attempt to combine live instrumental music with electronic recording and considered it "the most valuable development in Varèse's later music."

== Instrumentation ==
The piece is scored for the following instruments.

Woodwinds
2 flutes (both doubling piccolo)
2 clarinets (one doubling E♭ clarinet and one doubling bass clarinet)

Brass
2 horns
3 trumpets
3 trombones
2 tubas

Percussion (5 players)

1. 4 timpani, vibraphone, 2 suspended cymbals, tenor drum, and claves
2. glockenspiel, snare, field, and tenor drums, 2 timbales or tom-toms, 2 suspended cymbals, cencerro, tambourine, and 3 Chinese blocks
3. 2 bass drums with cymbals, field and tenor drums, cencerro, guiro, claves, tambourine, and chimes
4. vibraphone, 3 gongs, 2 lathes, guiro, and tambourine
5. xylophone, 3 Chinese blocks, 3 wooden drums, guiro, claves, maracas, and 2 lathes

Other

1 piano
electronic tape
