= Firehouse Theater =

Avant-garde theater in Minneapolis, US

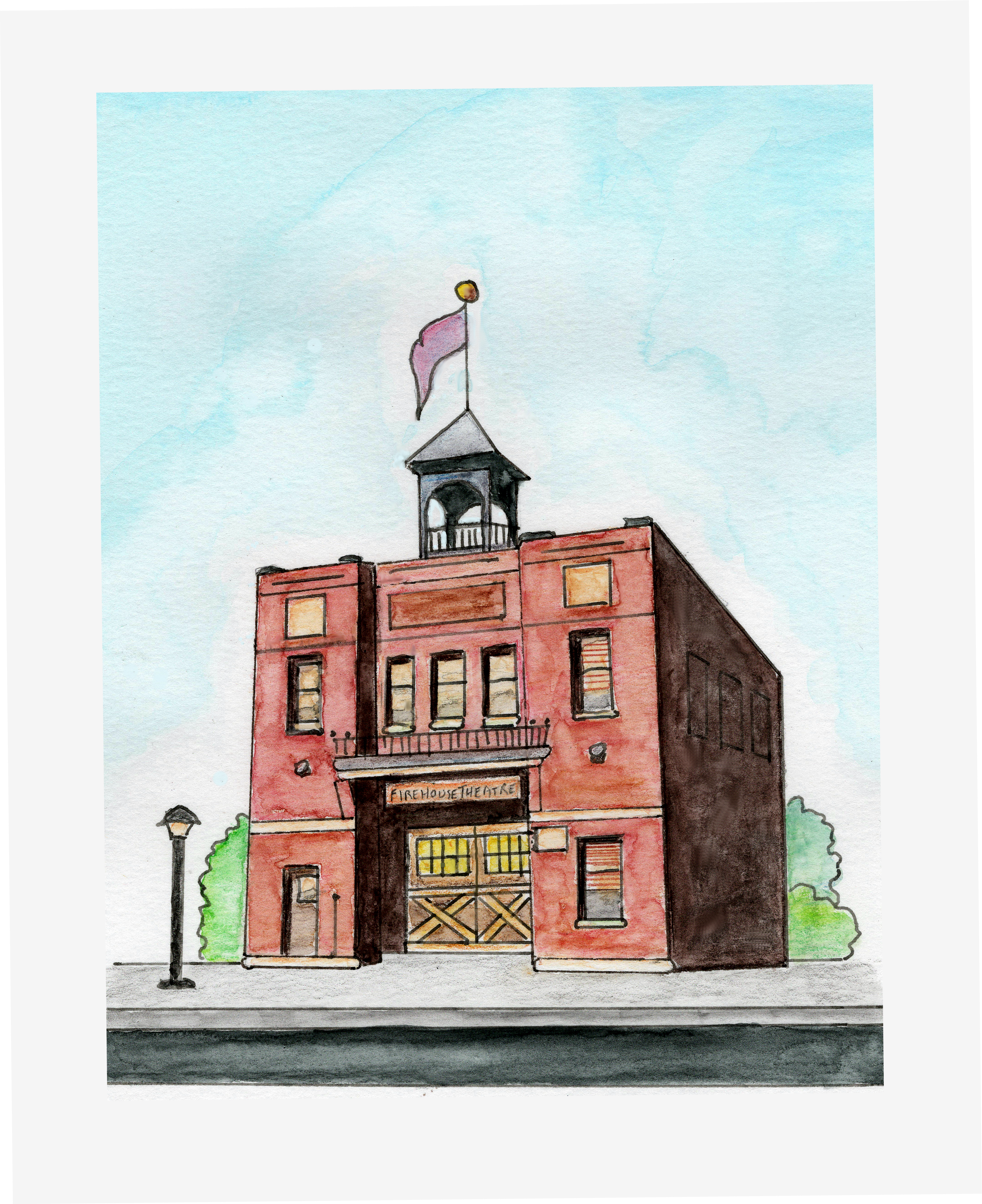
- Firehouse Theater, 1963
- Address: 3010 Minnehaha Avenue, near Lake Street; Minneapolis, Minnesota; United States
- Type: Regional theater

Construction
- Opened: 1963

The Firehouse Theater of Minneapolis and later of San Francisco was a significant producer of experimental, theater of the absurd, and avant guard theater in the 1960s and 1970s. Its productions included new plays and world premieres, often presented with radical or inventive directorial styles. The Firehouse introduced playwrights and new plays to Minneapolis and San Francisco. It premiered plays by Megan Terry, Sam Shepard, Jean-Claude van Itallie, María Irene Fornés and others; and it presented plays by Harold Pinter, John Arden, August Strindberg, John Osborne, Arthur Kopit, Eugène Ionesco, Berthold Brecht, Samuel Beckett and others. In a 1987 interview Martha Boesing, the artistic director of another Minneapolis theatre, described the Firehouse Theater as "the most extreme of all the groups creating experimental theater in the sixties, and the closest to Artaud’s vision." Writing in 1968, The New York Times said that the Firehouse Theater "has been doing avantgarde plays in Minneapolis nearly as long as the Tyrone Guthrie Theater has been doing the other kind, and with much less help from the Establishment." That same year, when a federal grant was provided to support the Firehouse, it was pointed out in the Congressional Record that the Firehouse Theatre "is the only major theatre dealing experimentally with the writing of plays and their production outside the metropolitan New York area."

== History ==
The Firehouse Theater began in Minneapolis in the summer of 1963. Director Marlow S. Hotchkiss, artist James F. Faber, actor John Shimek, and director Charles Morrison III joined forces, and raised funds to renovate an 1894 fire station located at 3010 Minnehaha Avenue near the corner of Lake Street. The theater space they created was a 166-seat theater on a proscenium stage with a small thrust into the audience. It was envisioned as a place for new playwrights and avant-garde drama. The first production was The Connection by Jack Gelber, which opened August 22, 1963. After the performance the audience and company stayed for a discussion, and that became a standard feature of the Firehouse Theater.

In 1965 the theater presented a group of six plays that had been developed by director Tom O'Horgan, and which were then remounted off-Broadway in New York at the La MaMa Experimental Theatre Club under the title Six from La Mama. The same year the theater faced funding problems, and another kind challenge was the theater's desire to be part of the community with a dependence on open auditions with amateur actors drawn from the local pool. The theater then regrouped and found new vision. It became a non-profit organization and received grants from the Rockefeller Foundation and the National Endowment for the Arts. Some important members of the company left, and Marlow Hotchkiss invited Sydney Schubert Walter to be the artistic director. Walter had been part of New York's Open Theatre. Walter describe his initial reaction, "I came here to the most bizarre collection of talents I’d seen. We had a hairdresser playing a villain, for instance... They promised me a fine crop of amateur actors and I got an assortment of freaks and misfits, so I stayed."

The theater experimented with the playing space — it evolved into a flexible modular space, with a less defined playing space and audience area. It developed a new style known as transformational theater, in which the performers, like shape-shifters, could transform from character to character. Audience involvement and improvisation were often featured. Directorial ideas took the form of wild explorations, strobe lights, film projections, and nudity. The theater would go on the road and tour other cities in the United States and also Europe.

In the spring of 1968, the Firehouse Theater toured Europe with its production of Megan Terry's play with music, Jack-Jack, described as a "wildly physical satire on American life." The European tour of Jack-Jack was preceded by a seven-week run in Minneapolis, and when the theater returned it ran for another three weeks. According to The New York Times, the nude scene in Jack-Jack "…is far more explicit than anything on the New York stage this season. But at the same time it is so much like a classical painting come to life, of nymphs and satyrs frolicking on the green, that no one in Minneapolis seems to have objected loudly enough to attract the censors."

In 1969 the Firehouse Theater appeared in New York at the La Mama performing the plays Rags and Faust. Back in Minneapolis the theater performed A Mass Actors and Audience on the Passion and Birth of Doctor John Faust According to the Spirit of Our Times, by Marlow Hotchkiss, which was to be last production in the Firehouse Theatre in its Minneapolis location. The theater lost its lease at the 19th century fire station, and moved to San Francisco. The company lived as a commune. Their first season in San Francisco began with a production of Blessings on March 20, 1970.

== Controversies ==
The theater at times attracted controversy. When the theater on tour appeared at school campuses, intense and passionate debates were sometimes stirred up among students and administrators. The Firehouse Theater was engaged in 1969 to present Faust, which contains nudity, at St. John's University at Collegeville, Minnesota — a Catholic men's college. Administrators at first approved, but later wanted to cancel the performance for a number of reasons, including the concerns that it might damage St. John's reputation, and might cause faculty and trustees to resign. This intention to cancel caused an uproar among the students. The school eventually allowed the performance, only because, they said, they wanted to "prevent physical violence" on the campus. The tour included a number of schools. When the theater company returned home, the Minneapolis Tribune said they seemed "relieved that they weren’t arrested and happy that none of their performances were cancelled, though a few came perilously close."

Another controversy occurred in 1968 in Minneapolis at an outdoor performance of Brecht's A Man’s a Man. The script had been approved by the City Council, but some members of the council, and some members of the police department, in Sydney Schubert Walter's telling, thought the play was "unfit for children, and objected to the sexual references." In the original script by Brecht, Walters said, a character "shoots off his dick", The Firehouse production instead had him turn his back, cut it off, then "throw it over his shoulder as if it were a banana". The performance ultimately was not shut down.

The theater was known for protesting the Vietnam war from the stage, and in October 1968, the artistic director, Sydney Schubert Walter, received an induction notice from the military. He was, at 33, older than the usual maximum age to be drafted, which was 26. Walter went to the federal building in Minneapolis to refuse the induction, claiming that his civil rights were being violated. Walter was accompanied by the theater company, and others, who staged a protest with singing and chanting in support of him.

== Production history ==
- Acts Without Words, 1967, 1969 Samuel Beckett
- Antigone, 1969 Sophocles
- Baal, 1965 Bertolt Brecht
- The Birthday Party, 1967 Harold Pinter
- Blessings, 1970 Nancy Walter
- The Brass Butterfly, 1963 William Golding
- The Brig, 1964 Kenneth H. Brown
- The Caretaker, 1963 Harold Pinter
- Carne Man, 1965
- The Connection, 1963 Jack Gelber
- Daddy Violet, 1968 George Birimisa
- The Dance of Death, 1964 August Strindberg
- Danton's Death, 1965 Georg Büchner
- Doomeager, 1973 John Franzen
- Dreamscapes 1972-1973
- Endgame, 1966 Samuel Beckett
- Escape by Balloon, 1970-1972 W.E.R. La Farge in collaboration with the Firehouse Theater Company
- A Few Skits and Songs about Things Right and Wrong with the World, the Church, and You, 1964 Richard S. Wilson
- Fourteen Hundred Thousand, 1966 Sam Shepard
- The Future is in Eggs, 1966 Eugène Ionesco
- The Gloaming, Oh My Darling, 1965 Megan Terry
- Happy Days, 1968 Samuel Beckett
- A House by the Stable, 1963
- The Hostage, 1964 Brendan Behan
- The Immoralist, 1964 Andre Gide
- Iphigenia Transformed, 1966 Allan Kaprow
- It Should Happen to a Dog, 1963 Wolf Mankowitz
- Jack, or The Submission, 1966 Eugène Ionesco
- Jack-Jack, 1968 Megan Terry
- Keep Tightly Closed in a Cool, Dry, Place, 1965, 1968 Megan Terry
- Krapp's Last Tape, 1967 Samuel Beckett
- Look Back in Anger, 1964 John Osborne
- Lord Halewyn, 1965 Michel de Ghelderode
- A Man is a Man 1968 Bertolt Brecht
- The Marriage of Mr. Mississippi, 1965 Friedrich Dürrenmatt
- A Mass Actors and Audience on the Passion and Birth of Doctor John Faust According to the Spirit of Our Times, 1969 Marlow Hotchkiss
- Mortality or the Passion of the Austro-Hungarian Empire, 1967
- Mysteries, Miracles, and Moralities, 1967
- Oh Dad, Poor Dad, Mamma's Hung You in the Closet and I'm Feelin' So Sad, 1965 Arthur Kopit
- Peer Gynt, 1967 Henrik Ibsen
- The People vs. the Ranchman, 1967 Megan Terry
- Play, 1965 Samuel Beckett
- Rags, 1968–1969, 1971 Nancy Walter
- Red Eye of Love, 1964 Arnold Weinstein
- Santa Claus, 1963 E. E. Cummings
- Serjeant Musgrave's Dance, 1965 John Arden
- The Sideshow, 1966
- A Song for All Saints, 1966 James Lineberger
- Stab and Dance, 1973-1974 Nancy Walter
- Still Falling, 1971 Nancy Walter
- The Successful Life of Three, 1965 María Irene Fornés
- Sweeney Agonistes, 1965 T. S. Eliot
- Tango Palace, 1965 María Irene Fornés
- The Thing Itself, 1967 Arthur Sainer
- The Three Men of Gotham, 1965 Edward Gordon Craig
- Traveling Light, 1972
- Trunity, 1968 Nancy Walter
- Victims of Duty, 1967 Eugène Ionesco
- Viet Rock, 1966 Megan Terry
- Waiting for Godot 1966 Samuel Beckett
- Where's de Queen, 1966 Jean-Claude van Itallie
- Woyzeck 1968, 1971 Georg Büchner
