= Lev Raphael =

American writer of Jewish heritage (born 1954)

- Born: Reuben Lewis Steinberg; May 19, 1954 (age 72); New York City, U.S.
- Education: Fordham University; University of Massachusetts Amherst; Michigan State University (PhD)
- Occupation: Writer
- Writing career
- Genres: fiction, memoir
- Notable works: Dancing on Tisha B'Av, Winter Eyes, My Germany
- Website: Official website

Lev Raphael (born May 19, 1954) is an American writer of Jewish heritage. He has published work in a variety of genres, including literary fiction, murder mysteries, fantasy, short stories, memoir and non-fiction, and is known for being one of the most prominent LGBT figures in contemporary Jewish American literature. He is one of the first American-Jewish writers to publish fiction about children of Holocaust survivors, beginning to do so in 1978.

== Early life and education ==
He was born as Reuben Lewis Steinberg in New York City. His Holocaust survivor parents were culturally Jewish but not religious. As an adult, he changed his name to Lev as a part of reclaiming his Jewish heritage, and later adopted the surname Raphael to reaffirm his Jewishness and abandoned a German one.

He studied English at Fordham University and creative writing and English at the University of Massachusetts Amherst, where he won the Harvey Swados Fiction Prize awarded by Martha Foley, editor of The Best American Short Stories, for his first published short story which later appeared in Redbook.

He received a Ph.D. in English from Michigan State University in 1986. Special Collections at that university's library holds The Lev Raphael Papers.

== Writing ==
His first short story collection, Dancing on Tisha B’Av, won a Lambda Literary Award in the Gay Debut Fiction category at the 3rd Lambda Literary Awards in 1990. He was also nominated for Lambdas in the Gay Fiction category at the 5th Lambda Literary Awards in 1992 for his novel Winter Eyes, in the Spirituality category at the 9th Lambda Literary Awards in 1997 for his memoir Journeys and Arrivals, and in the Gay Mystery category at the 12th Lambda Literary Awards in 2000 for The Death of a Constant Lover.

He won the Crossing Boundaries Award from International Quarterly for "Losing My Mother", an essay contained in his memoir Writing a Jewish Life. The judge was D.M. Thomas, author of The White Hotel.

In 1996, Raphael began publishing a series of mystery novels centred on Nick Hoffman, an English professor and amateur detective investigating murders in the academic world.

In addition to publishing The German Money and Secret Anniversaries of the Heart with Leapfrog Press, Raphael also served as the finalist judge for the 2012 Leapfrog Press Global Fiction Prize Contest, selecting Jacob White's Being Dead in South Carolina as the winner.

He is a former visiting assistant professor in English and creative writing at Michigan State University. He also previously hosted a weekly radio show about books and literature on WLNZ in Lansing, Michigan. He has been a book reviewer for The Detroit Free Press and The Washington Post, and has published both short stories and essays in a wide variety of both LGBT and Jewish publications. Since 2021, he has published close to 100 personal essays and short stories in a wide range of literary magazines online and in print.

== Works ==
=== Novels ===
- Winter Eyes (1992)
- Let's Get Criminal (1996)
- The Edith Wharton Murders (1997)
- The Death of a Constant Lover (1998)
- Little Miss Evil (2000)
- Burning Down the House (2001)
- The German Money (2003)
- Tropic of Murder (2004)
- Hot Rocks (2007)
- Pride and Prejudice: The Jewess and the Gentile (2011)
- Rosedale in Love (2011)
- The Vampyre of Gotham (2012)
- Assault with a Deadly Lie (2014)
- State University of Murder (2019)
- Department of Death (2021)

=== Short stories ===
- Dancing on Tisha B'Av (1990)
- Secret Anniversaries of the Heart (2006)

=== Memoir ===
- Journeys & Arrivals (1996)
- Writing a Jewish Life (2006)
- My Germany (2009)

=== Non-fiction ===
- Edith Wharton's Prisoners of Shame (1991)
- Stick Up For Yourself! (1992, with Gershen Kaufman and Pamela Espeland)
- Coming Out of Shame (1995, with Gershen Kaufman)
- Book Lust! (2012)
- Writer's Block is Bunk (2012)
