= Broom Street Theater =

Experimental theater in Madison, Wisconsin, US

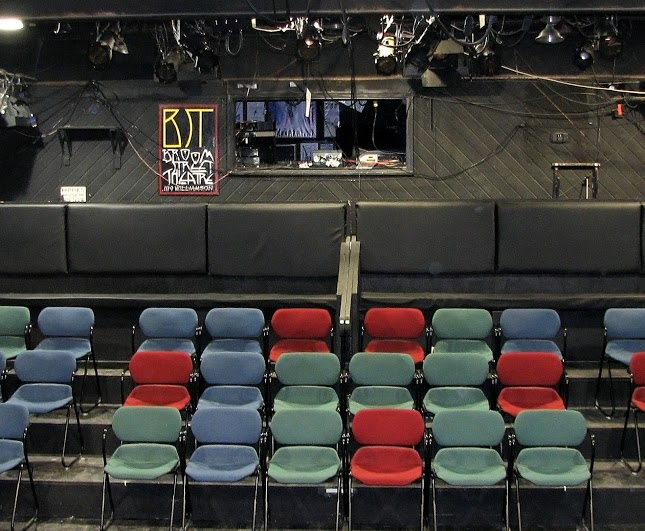
- Broom Street Theater, on Williamson Street
- Interactive map of Broom Street Theater
- Address: 1119 Williamson Street; Madison, Wisconsin; United States
- Coordinates: 43°04′56″N 89°21′55″W
- Owner: Broom Street Theater
- Capacity: 50 to 99
- Current use: Live theater, music and dance performance

Construction
- Opened: August 12, 1977 (building)
- Years active: 1969–present

Website
- www.bstonline.org

Broom Street Theater (also known as Broom Street or BST) is an experimental black box theater located in the heart of Madison's isthmus. As one of the oldest and most prolific experimental theater companies in the United States, it has produced over 350 original works. Productions are most frequently written and directed by local playwrights and artists, who are able to realize their vision without censorship of content or presentation. Broom Street Theater is a 501(c)(3) member-run non-profit which currently produces nine to ten plays per year.

== History ==
=== Foundation and early years ===
Broom Street Theater was founded by Stuart Gordon in early 1969 in reaction to censorship attempts by the University of Wisconsin-Madison on Gordon's on-campus theater troupe, Screw Theater. The controversy surrounding nudity in the production of Peter Pan had received national attention in the fall of 1968. BST's first public performance, a reinterpretation of Lysistrata, occurred on May 9, 1969, after a several-months delay due to legal action by the Dane County District Attorney. Gordon left Broom Street after its first production, founding the Organic Theater Company, which moved to Chicago in 1970. Broom Street Theater has never performed on Broom Street, but takes its name from the location of its first rehearsal space, the third story of the Heeb warehouse, condemned and demolished by the City of Madison in 1969 to make way for a left-turn lane onto University Avenue.

After Lysistrata closed, Gordon ended his involvement with Broom Street, and a search was made for his replacement. Until June 1970, the theater's organization was fluid and changing, in a variety of administrative styles. Don Hilgenberg served as artistic director for several months in late 1969, and in 1970 there was an aesthetics committee selecting plays. In June 1970, Joel Gersmann began serving as artistic director. A search committee had previously selected him to direct the theater's second play, Woyzeck, in July 1969. Gersmann would serve as artistic director until his death in 2005.

After performing in several locations around the UW-Madison campus, the theater found a semi-permanent home in the basement of St. Francis House, 1001 University Avenue. Performances occurred in the chapel from the fall of 1970 until mid 1975. In late 1974, a visiting bishop witnessed a performance of The Song of Bernadette, where an excessive amount of Oreo cookies, representing communion wafers, were stuffed into an actress' mouth portraying Saint Bernadette Soubirous. By May of 1975, the theater's use of performance space at St. Francis House came to an end, due to the controversy generated by Bernadette. The theater's time at St. Francis House included film and video projects, a literary magazine, and performance tours on UW System campuses around the state, and nationally.

=== Permanent home ===
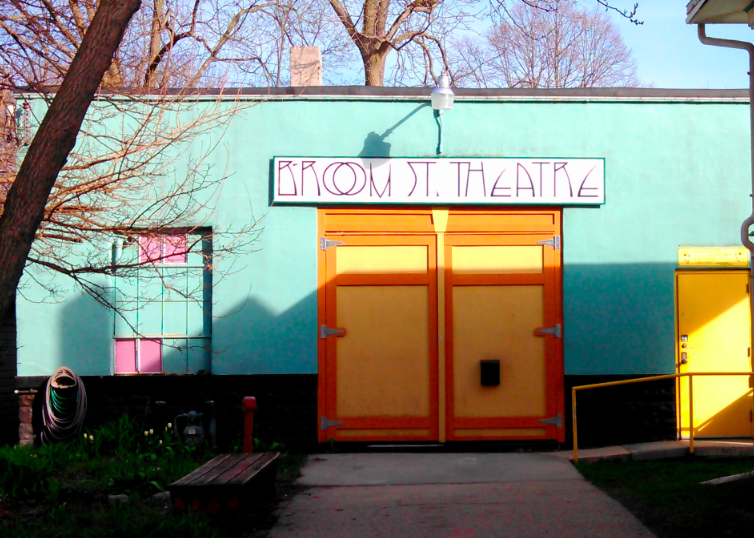
Broom Street Theater exterior

After leaving St. Frances House, the theater focused for two years on purchasing its own building, culminating in the acquisition of an old radiator repair shop at 1119 Williamson Street. The theater's main energies were and continue to be devoted to producing original theater in this space. The number of plays produced expanded to 7 shows per year with 6 week runs. BST has gone on to produce over 250 original productions since taking ownership of the building. During this period, dozens of new playwright/directors premiered their works at BST.

=== Post-Gersmann ===
The passing of Joel Gersmann required a substantial change to the organization of the theater, as he had been solely responsible for its management for 35 years. Callen Harty was appointed Artistic Director in July 2005, while the board of directors took a more active role in running the organization. By early 2006, the theater's articles of incorporation and bylaws were rewritten to make it a member-run organization with direct election of board members. Later that year, the roles of Technical Director and Development Director were established, completing this transitional phase.

In October 2010, Callen Harty resigned as Artistic Director, succeeded by Heather Renken. Under Renken, the theater switched its format to a ten-show season with four-week runs. Doug Reed became the Artistic Director in 2017.

== Critical response ==
Especially early on, Broom Street style and Gersmann style were seen as one and the same. This style was frequently criticized for the shows being too long, being unpolished in the writing, the actors screaming their lines and playing multiple roles, and repeating themes ad nauseam. Criticism has sometimes manifested itself in the concept of a "typical Broom Street" show, often used in a negative light by reviewers. Despite this, the theater has received positive reviews from alternative and mainstream press and was invited to tour numerous times in its early years.

== Notable people ==
Like Stuart Gordon, many BST members went on to found other theaters through the years, among them Proud Theater, Organic Theater, Tapit New Works, Mercury Players Theater, Dysfunctional Theatre, and Insurgent Theater.

Aside from Gordon and Gersmann, some of Broom Street's noteworthy actors, playwrights, and directors include:

- Gary Aylesworth, actor and playwright
- Mike Baron
- Tom Barrett
- Rod Clark, editor, Rosebud literary magazine
- André DeShields
- Charlie Hill
- Jill Holden, actress
- Gip Hoppe, director and playwright
- Charlie Kaufman
- Dan Levin, filmmaker
- Patrick McGilligan

== See also ==
- Joel Gersmann
