= At the Foot of the Mountain Theater =

Feminist theater troupe based in Minneapolis, Minnesota

- Formation: 1974
- Dissolved: 1991
- Type: Theatre group
- Purpose: Feminist theatre
- Location: Minneapolis, Minnesota
- Notable members: Martha Boesing

At the Foot of the Mountain Theater (AFOM) was a professional theater based in Minneapolis, Minnesota, that created and produced works centered on women's lives. Founded in 1974 and re-dedicated as a feminist theatre in 1977, it produced unique works on wide-ranging topics both in local productions and also through touring and performances at theater festivals. At the Foot of the Mountain Theater closed in 1991.

== History ==
Founded by Martha and Paul Boesing and Jan Magrane in 1974, At the Foot of the Mountain grew out of their experiences with experimental theater including at The Open Theater in New York City and the Firehouse Theater in the 1960s in Minneapolis. (Note: She (Martha) has been combining her social and political concern with theater since the early 1960s, when she and her former husband, Paul, were members of the Firehouse Theatre, considered by many to be the city’s most influential theater group.) Boesing's involvement in the theater ended temporarily in 1984 when she accepted an 18-month Bush Fellowship to focus on her playwriting.

== Organizational structure ==
The collective's tasks included the shows themselves, but also the rest of the logistics—publicity, costumes, finances—within a non-hierarchical consensus-based structure. "There are no role models," said Boesing—who was also the playwright for the first 10 years—in a 1979 interview. Audience participation also was a critical ingredient throughout the theater's work. AFOM was able to pay its members a regular amount each week, so that AFOM could be their primary focus. Funding came from a combination of ticket sales, touring, and grants from the National Endowment for the Arts, the Regional Arts Council, the Northwest Area Foundation and the Minnesota Humanities Commission.

== Works ==
At the Foot of the Mountain mainly operated out of the People’s Center on the West Bank of the University of Minnesota, and it produced 1–4 works each year. Generally, each work was a collective effort, with the script being written internally in collaboration with the cast. Its production of Antigone Too: Rites of Love and Defiance was based on a script that included much of Sophocles' text, plus the stories of 17 American women involved in politics including Dorothy Day, Emma Goldman, Margaret Sanger and Fannie Lou Hamer. The 21-member cast, selected from 50 applicants, worked on the production over an eight-week residency.

At the Foot of the Mountain's topics were diverse, including prostitution, motherhood, nuclear stockpiling, the Catholic church, rape culture, U.S. involvement in Nicaragua and prison reform.

== Controversy ==
Haunted by the Holy Ghost a 1983 production—written by co-founder and collective member Jan Magrane—was a direct statement on the inherent oppressiveness of the Catholic Church. Negative responses included the Minneapolis City Council declining to pass a resolution commending the theater for its 10-year contribution to the city, and an inquiry by the Catholic League for Religious and Civil Rights into Minnesota State Arts Board funding of At the Foot of the Mountain, claiming the work was defamatory, and requesting that future funding be restricted.
