= Gerome Ragni =

American actor, singer, and songwriter (1935–1991)

- Born: Jerome Bernard Ragni; September 11, 1935; Pittsburgh, Pennsylvania, U.S.
- Died: July 10, 1991 (aged 55); New York (state), U.S.
- Occupations: Playwright, lyricist, actor
- Years active: 1964–1991
- Notable work: Hair
- Spouse: Stephanie Williams (m. 1963 – 1970; divorced)
- Children: 1

Gerome Ragni (born Jerome Bernard Ragni; September 11, 1935 – July 10, 1991) was an American actor, singer, and songwriter, best known as one of the stars and co-writers of the 1967 musical Hair. On June 18, 2009, he was inducted into the Songwriters Hall of Fame.

== Early life ==
Born Jerome Bernard Ragni in Pittsburgh, Pennsylvania, he was one of ten Italian-American siblings. He attended suburban Scott Township High School, where he appeared in various school productions. He attended Georgetown University and The Catholic University of America. At Catholic University, he discovered an interest in theater, and began studying acting with Philip Burton. Ragni made his acting debut in Washington, D.C. in 1954, playing Father Corr in Shadow and Substance. He continued to act whenever he could find work. In 1963, he appeared in the New York production of War at the Village South Theatre, for which he won the Barter Theatre Award for Outstanding Actor.

== Career ==
In 1954, Ragni made his professional stage debut in a Washington D.C. production, Shadow and Substance. In 1964, he was an understudy for the role of Horatio at the Lunt-Fontanne Theatre in the Broadway production of Hamlet, starring Richard Burton. He then appeared as the Messenger (uncredited) in Richard Burton's Hamlet, the film version of the production, released by Warner Bros. in 1964.

That same year, Ragni made his first Off-Broadway appearance in New York City in the anti-capital punishment musical Hang Down Your Head and Die at the Mayfair Theatre on October 18 with James Rado, a fellow actor and friend who was studying with Lee Strasberg. Hang Down Your Head and Die was a success in London. It was first produced in the UK by the Oxford University Experimental Theatre Club in 1964; two cast members and writers were students Terry Jones and Michael Palin, who would later achieve fame as members of the Monty Python comedy troupe. It then moved from Oxford to the Comedy Theatre in London's West End, was well-received and ran six weeks. But when it moved to New York the musical only had one performance, opening and closing on October 18, 1964. Theater critic Howard Taubman wrote in The New York Times, "Death by hanging is swift, but Hang Down Your Head and Die makes a long evening of it... After a while, one feels as if one were being bludgeoned."

In 1965, Ragni performed in the role of Tom in The Knack, the play that opened at the New Theatre, and later appeared in the touring company along with Rado. During the show's Chicago run at the Harper Theater, Rado and Ragni tried to revive Hang Down Your Head and Die with what they could remember from the script. They also planned to introduce new material in collaboration with Corky Siegel and Jim Schwall, of the Siegel-Schwall Band, whom they met playing in a beatnik coffee house off the Harper Street strip. They spent time writing ideas for the production, which was to be performed by Rado, Ragni, Schwall, and Siegel in a house on the South Side of Chicago and an apartment on Stony Island Avenue. Rado and Ragni rented the Harper Theatre to put on the production. After two weeks of working on the production, The Knack company went back to New York and Ragni and Rado had to abandon their plans to revive Hang Down Your Head and Die with Siegel and Schwall.

== Hair ==
Ragni had been involved with The Open Theater since it was begun as part of the Living Theatre in 1962. In 1966, Open Theatre began rehearsals for the Megan Terry play Viet Rock. Ragni took a leading role in the show, which opened at the Martinique Theatre in New York and had a successful run.

Viet Rock and experimental theatre inspired Ragni to work with Rado on a musical about hippie culture. As research, they associated with a group of youths in the East Village who were dropping out and dodging the draft. They talked to people in the streets and people they knew, and read articles about hippie culture and youths being kicked out of school for growing their hair long. They wrote lyrics to thirteen songs ("Ain't Got No", "I Got Life", "Reading and Writing", "Don't Put It Down", "Sodomy", "Colored Spade", "Manchester, England", "Frank Mills", "We Look at One Another", "Hair", "Aquarius", "Easy to Be Hard", "Good Morning Starshine" and "Where Do I Go?"), and completed the first version of their musical, called Hair. Two of the thirteen songs were removed, many songs were revised, titles were changed, and more songs were written as they continued to work on the show.

Once they agreed on a draft, Ragni and Rado brought the idea to producer Nat Shapiro for consideration. He responded to the songs by asking, "Where's the music?" Shapiro introduced Ragni and Rado to composer Galt MacDermot, who took the script and returned three weeks later with music for the songs Ragni and Rado had written. Their agent, Janet Roberts, tried to sell the show to Broadway producers, but it was rejected. Joseph Papp, of the New York Shakespeare Festival, called to say he wanted to produce it at his new theatre on Lafayette Street. Gerald Freedman was artistic director for the theater and signed on to direct the first production of Hair. On October 29, 1967, Hair opened at The Public Theater with Ragni as Berger, MacDermot as a cop who busts the show at the end of the first act, and Rado as Claude. Michael Butler attended the opening night and subsequent performances, and was dissatisfied when Rado did not regularly play Claude, as he felt Rado had a natural affinity for the part.

Butler became interested in moving the show to Broadway. He bought the rights from Papp for $50,000 and began planning a grander production directed by Tom O'Horgan, who Ragni knew from off-Broadway. In the meantime, the show moved to a nightclub in Midtown, called Cheetah, where it had a month-long run. When O'Horgan signed on, the show hired choreographer Julie Arenal, assistant to Anna Sokolow, who had choreographed the Public Theater run.

On April 29, 1968, the show re-opened in its revised form at the Biltmore Theatre on Broadway. Rado and Ragni reprised their roles from the off-Broadway production, and MacDermot was the musical director. The songs became hit singles for MacDermot, Liza Minnelli, Nelson Riddle, The Staples Singers, Quincy Jones, Three Dog Night, The Cowsills, Madeline Bell, Paul Jones, Sonja Kristina, The 5th Dimension, Oliver, Caterina Valente, and Barbra Streisand. The Broadway cast Hair album, released on RCA Records, topped the US billboard charts for a year. The 1970 album DisinHAIRited was then released with songs that were cut from the revised production.

The Broadway production was a traumatic experience for Ragni. He became wealthy, his marriage broke up, and he became disengaged from mainstream society. He joined a cult and contributed money to the Black Panther Party and the Yippies. Following the Broadway production, Ragni and Rado went to Los Angeles and played their original roles in a production of Hair for five months, making changes to the show as they performed. When they returned to the Broadway production, Ragni's practice of spontaneously changing the show became a nuisance. In one incident, Ragni and Rado were arrested after walking nude down the aisle during a performance. At another time, there were guards outside the theatre who barred Ragni and Rado from entering. When the conflict was resolved, all Ragni's changes were written into the script and Ragni and Rado rejoined the show. Soon afterwards, Ragni joined the touring company, playing Berger in many cities.

In 1969, shortly after Hair's success, Ragni, Rado, and Viva, the Andy Warhol superstar, made the movie Lions Love, directed by Agnès Varda and made in Los Angeles. The film depicts the three stars, supposedly living together in Los Angeles while waiting for a film to start shooting. Lions Love is one of the best film records of Rado and Ragni. They did not appear in the 1979 film version of Hair, which was directed by Miloš Forman and starred Treat Williams as Berger. Neither Rado nor Ragni approved of the film, although it was well received by the public.

== Dude ==
Ragni had been working on a musical called Dude (The Highway Life) ever since Hair had opened. He had bulging notebooks filled with scribbles of dialogue and lyrics written in between meals at Max's Kansas City. Combined with it was a 2,000-page script. He wrote the music to 50 of the songs in the show. Producing the musical would entail having "the interior of the [theater] scooped out and turned into a free-wheeling environmental theater in the round representing heaven and hell." According to The New York Times, "[a]t the first run through, the stage, filled with two tons of top soil, filthied the actors and dumped dirt on everybody sitting in the first ten rows. People sneezed from the dust fumes; clouds of dirt rose into the air, making it difficult to see." The 2,000 pages were cut down to 200, a second act was written, more songs were added, and although in a constant state of change and plagued with backstage problems the show opened at The Broadway Theatre in October 1972. It was produced by Peter and Adela Holzer and starred Nell Carter, Rae Allen, Salome Bey, Ralph Carter, William Redfield, Nat Morris, and Allan Nicholls, and closed after 16 performances. Before the opening, MacDermot's label Kilmarnock Records released an album of songs from the show sung by Salome Bey.

=== Post-Dude ===
In 1977 Ragni and Rado collaborated with Steve Margoshes on a new show called Jack Sound and His Dog Star Blowing His Final Trumpet on the Day of Doom, produced off-Broadway by the Ensemble Studio Theatre. It played a short run alongside an ill-fated Broadway revival of Hair that ran for forty-three performances and starred Ragni and Rado as the bogus cops who bust the show.

In the 1970s Ragni, Rado, MacDermot, and Margoshes collaborated on a new musical called Sun, also called YMCA, which ultimately was not produced. It was a 60-song, three-hour musical about "evolution, with an Odyssey plot"; an environmental musical about politics, pollution and the rain forests being cut down among other topics. Sun had been in development since the mid-1970s and an early version was staged for backers in 1976, directed by John Vaccaro of Theatre of the Ridiculous fame, with appearances by Ruby Lynn Reyner, Annie-Joe Edwards and Ellen Foley. Rado told New York Magazine that "YMCA will do to the seventies what Hair did to the sixties," but the 1976 version never made it past rehearsals. A three-disc cast recording was made after a performance at Weill Hall at Carnegie Hall by independent company Rado Records.

== Death ==
Ragni died of cancer in New York, aged 55, on July 10, 1991. At the time of his death, he and Rado were working on a sequel to Hair. He is interred in the Holy Souls Cemetery, Pittsburgh, Pennsylvania.

== Personal life ==
On May 18, 1963, Ragni married Stephanie Williams. The union ended in divorce in 1970. They have a son named Erick.

In a 2008 interview with The Advocate, Rado said that he and Ragni had been lovers, and described himself as omnisexual.
