= Proud Theater =

- Formation: 1999
- Type: Theatre group
- Purpose: Devised theater
- Location: Madison, Wisconsin
- Artistic director: Brian Wild
- Website: proudtheater.org

Proud Theater is a nonprofit theatre organization for LGBTQ+ youth with companies in the Wisconsin city of Madison. Proud Theater was founded in Madison in 1999 by Sol Kelley-Jones and Callen Harty. Harty is notable in the Madison theater community as having been Artistic Director of Broom Street Theater from 2005-2010. Harty's long-time partner Brian Wild, also formerly of Broom Street Theater, has served as executive director since Proud Theater's formal independent organization in 2011. Proud Theater was a founding member of the Pride Youth Theater Alliance, a national network of queer youth theaters affiliated with The Theater Offensive.

Proud Theater is made up of LGBTQ+ youth and allies in the greater Madison area and volunteer Mentors (most of which are Proud Theater alumni) who help support and direct the Youth.
