= Andrea Natalie =

American cartoonist

- Born: 1958 (age 67–68)
- Education: Cornell University
- Occupation: Cartoonist
- Years active: 1989-1994
- Notable work: Stonewall Riots The Night Audrey's Vibrator Spoke: A Stonewall Riots Collection Rubyfruit Mountain: A Stonewall Riots Collection

Andrea Natalie (born 1958) is an American cartoonist. She is the creator of the Stonewall Riots collections and founded the Lesbian Cartoonists' Network.

== Biography ==
Andrea Natalie spent her childhood in Arizona and moved to New York to attend school at Cornell University. She worked in Los Angeles for several years as a waitress, cab driver, and janitor. She was 22 when she moved to New York City and came out as a lesbian. Shortly after, Natalie became involved in radical lesbian feminist politics and was the media representative for Sonia Johnson's presidential campaign. She also ran a lesbian adventure social club called Women About. Natalie wanted to become a playwright, but ultimately turned to comics in 1989.

== Career ==
Andrea Natalie's cartoons follow a single-panel style. In addition to the three collections she published, Natalie's works have been syndicated in many gay and lesbian newspapers across the United States. Her cartoons cover a wide variety of subjects but primarily center around themes of politics, feminism, and queer culture in the late 80s and early 90s.

=== Works and contributions ===
- Natalie, Andrea. Stonewall Riots, Venus Press, 1990.
- Triptow, Robert. Gay Comix #13, Bob Ross, 1991.
- Jones, Gerard. Real Girl #2, Fantagraphics, 1991.
- Mangels, Andy. Gay Comix #14, Bob Ross, 1991.
- Leschen, Caryn. Wimmin's Comix #17, Rip Off Press, 1992.
- Mangels, Andy. Gay Comics #15, Bob Ross, 1992.
- Mangels, Andy. Gay Comics #16, Bob Ross, 1992.
- Natalie, Andrea. The Night Audrey's Vibrator Spoke: A Stonewall Riots Collection, Cleis Press, 1992.
- Mangels, Andy. Gay Comics #18, Bob Ross, 1993.
- Natalie, Andrea. Rubyfruit Mountain: A Stonewall Riots Collection, Cleis Press, 1993.
- Gregory, Roberta. Dyke's Delight #2, Cath Tate & Carol Bennett, 1994.
- Mangels, Andy. Gay Comics #25, Bob Ross, 1998.
- Hall, Justin. No Straight Lines: Four Decades of Queer Comics, Fantagraphics, 2012.

=== Reception ===
Natalie's cartoons were popular among the lesbian and feminist communities. She received several positive reviews for her collections in feminist newspapers like Sojourner: the Women's Forum. Other lesbian cartoonists also supported and commended Natalie's work such as Alison Bechdel, Roz Warren, and Kris Kovick.

=== Awards and recognition ===
- 1991 Hot Wire Reader's Choice recipient
- 1991 Lambda Literary Award nomination for Stonewall Riots (1990)
- 1993 Lambda Literary Award nomination for The Night Audrey's Vibrator Spoke: A Stonewall Riots Collection (1992)

=== Lesbian Cartoonists' Network ===
Natalie created the Lesbian Cartoonists' Network as a way for queer, feminist artists to connect and get support from one another. She founded the newsletter because she did not have anyone to look up to and speak with when she was starting out. The newsletter was written mostly by cartoonists and discussed how to get work published and syndicated and what art supplies are useful for beginners. The free newsletter was sent to members quarterly. Natalie recruited people to join the network by asking members for their contacts, finding cartoonists that were printed in obscure lesbian newspapers, contacting mainstream cartoonists, and putting notices about the LCN in 500 queer papers. Cartoonists who joined the network said that the LCN helped them feel more visible and informed as artists.

=== Artist influences ===
As a child, Natalie only had access to two cartoonists: Charles Addams and Edward Gorey. She inherited her feminist beliefs from her mother who guided Natalie to read Betty Friedan. Artistically, Natalie primarily drew influence from Gary Larson who also drew in a single-panel style. She also read Alison Bechdel's comics as a beginner and stated her admiration for Roz Warren.

== Personal life ==
Drawing cartoons was not enough for Natalie to make a living. She earned money working as a waitress and dancer at a topless bar. Natalie found this work environment boring and not inspirational. She continued in this line of work because she could earn a large amount of money in a small amount of time, which left her more time to work on her cartoons. As of her last recorded interviews, Natalie was planning on attending nursing school as a financial alternative to the topless bar. Over the duration of her years as an active cartoonist, Natalie mentioned she was living with an unnamed partner.
