= Jane Caminos =

American cartoonist

- Born: 1947 (age 78–79); Brooklyn, New York, United States
- Notable work: That's Ms. Bulldyke to You, Charlie!; On Women Bound

Jane Caminos (born 1947) is an American cartoonist and painter. She is known for her lesbian-themed cartoons as well as paintings inspired by the Vietnam War and violence against women.

== Personal life ==
She was born in 1947 in Brooklyn, New York. She grew up in Pompton Lakes, New Jersey.

She graduated with a Bachelor of Fine Arts from Rhode Island School of Design in 1969. Her works in college were largely inspired by the Vietnam War and violence against women. In the 1960s, she participated in anti-war protests and created works like "Grenade" and "Fear". Her formative influences were James Thurber and Don Martin.

In 2016, she moved to Seattle, Washington.

== Career ==
In the 1970s, she worked as an art director for books and periodicals but also did freelance work as an illustrator. She moved to New York City in 1991 and brought her design studio, Illustratus, with her.

In 1991 and 1992, she created a series of cartoons that were collected into a volume titled That’s Ms Bulldyke To You, Charlie!. Madwoman Press published the volume in November of 1992. The book was a finalist in the Humor category for the 5th Lambda Literary Awards.

Her cartoons have been republished in the collections What Is This Thing Called Sex?: Cartoons By Women, Dyke Strippers: Lesbian Cartoonists A to Z, and The Best Contemporary Women's Humor, as well as the periodicals Christopher Street, Gaze Magazine, and Lesbians in Colorado.

In 2012, after watching a PBS documentary on violence against women, she created her well-known exhibition On Women Bound. The exhibition contains a collection of her pieces that explore the lives of all women. She also made a follow-up series called On Women Unbound.

In 2018, she became associated with Fogue Studio & Gallery, a studio for established artists over the age of fifty. She has created many solo and group exhibitions across the United States including in Chicago, New York City, New Jersey, and California.
