= America Hurrah =

1966 satirical play

- Program cover for the premiere of America Hurrah at the Pocket Theatre. Art by Francisca Duran-Reynals.
- Written by: Jean-Claude van Itallie
- Subject: American consumerism; Vietnam War

Premiere
- Date premiered: December 7, 1966 (59 years ago)
- Place premiered: Pocket Theatre; New York City
- Official website

America Hurrah is a satirical play by Jean-Claude van Itallie, which premiered at the Pocket Theatre in New York City on November 7, 1966. Directed by Jacques Levy and Joseph Chaikin, the play was an early expression of the burgeoning 1960s counterculture, expressing discontent with American consumerism and involvement in the Vietnam War. America Hurrah consists of three one-act plays: "Interview"; "TV"; and "Motel".

== Production history ==
=== New York City ===
Two of the one-acts were first presented at La MaMa Experimental Theatre Club in 1964 and 1965. Interview was directed by Peter Feldman, and Motel was directed by Michael Kahn. Interview had begun as an exercise at Chaikin's Open Theater.

When the trilogy premiered in 1966, Interview was directed by Chaikin, and TV and Motel were directed by Levy. Stephanie Sills produced the trilogy, and incidental music was composed by Marianne de Pury and Fred Cantor. Ken Glickfeld was the stage manager, technical director, and lighting designer, and Tania Leontov designed the costumes with assistance from Beckie Cunningham.

The cast included Cynthia Harris, Conard Fowkes, James Barbosa, Ronnie Gilbert, Brenda Smiley, Henry Calvert, Bill Macy, and Joyce Aaron. Motel featured actors wearing large doll heads constructed by Robert Wilson. The Pocket Theatre production closed on May 5, 1968, after 634 performances.

=== Australia ===
The show was performed in Australia by the New Theatre in Sydney in 1968, causing police action to be taken against the acting company. After 13 performances, Motel, in which two big dolls scrawl obscenities on the walls of a motel room, was banned on moral grounds by the New South Wales Chief Secretary. While the production continued, with the banned segment replaced by a satire about the ban, a committee called "Friends of America Hurrah" prepared plans for a one-night performance of the original version. This played to a full house in the Teachers Federation auditorium while thousands of people waited outside on Sussex Street, hoping to get in.

Audience excitement was high at the end of Motel, when police attempted to arrest the two heavily disguised dolls in the cast as they ran for the auditorium door. The actors appeared to vanish, but protected by fellow cast members, they actually shed their costumes and returned to mingle with other cast members who were trying to stop the police from tearing apart the set to take as evidence. There were no prosecutions, and the confiscated pieces of the set were eventually returned.

The cast at the New Theatre in Sydney included Maggie Kirkpatrick, John Hargreaves, and Carole Skinner.

== Publication ==
America Hurrah was first published by Coward-McCann in the United States and by Penguin Books in Great Britain. It was subsequently published in mass market paperback by Bantam Books, then by Grove Press.

== Awards ==
- 1966–1967 Outer Critics Circle Award for Best Production
- 1966–1967 Drama Desk Award
