= Becoming a Man =

1992 book

- Author: Paul Monette
- Language: English
- Publisher: Harcourt
- Publication date: 1992
- Publication place: United States
- Pages: 288

Becoming a Man: Half a Life Story is an autobiographical book by Paul Monette. It won a National Book Award in 1992, the same year it was published.
