= Magic Theatre (Omaha) =

Coordinates: 41°15′26.44″N 95°56′13.82″W

The Magic Theatre is located at 325 South 16th Street in Omaha, Nebraska, United States. Founded in 1968 by Jo Ann Schmidman, the theatre is designed to be an experimental theatre by and for people in the Midwest. The Magic Theatre has toured around the world, including the Suwon Castle International Theater Festival in South Korea. The theatre itself was closed and sold by the city of Omaha in 2007.

== About ==
Today Schmidman is the Theatre's Director, with Megan Terry serving as the playwright-in-residence and as Magic Theatre's "literary manager" Among their best known productions are Approaching Simone, Viet Rock, Calm Down, Mother, and Hot House. The archives of the Omaha Magic Theatre have been placed in the Bancroft Library at the University of California at Berkeley.

== Publications ==
In addition to performing work by playwrights from across the country, Schmidman and Megan Terry have published several of the Magic Theatre's original productions.

- (1990) Breakfast Serial. Omaha Magic Theatre.
- (1990) Body Leaks. Omaha Magic Theatre Press.
- (1988) Amtrak. Omaha Magic Theatre Press.
- (1988) Headlights. Omaha Magic Theatre Press.
- (1988) Retro. Omaha Magic Theatre Press.
- (1987) Dinner's in the Blender. Omaha Magic Theatre Press.
- (1986) Family Talk. Omaha Magic Theatre Press.
- (1981) The Trees Blew Down. Omaha Magic Theatre Press.
- (1981) Flat in Afghanistan. Omaha Magic Theatre Press.
- (1981) Katmandu. Omaha Magic Theatre Press.
- (1981) Performance Piece. Omaha Magic Theatre Press.
- (1981) Winners: The Lives of a Traveling Family Circus and Mother Jones. Omaha Magic Theatre Press.
- (1980) Advances, Omaha Magic Theatre Press. Omaha Magic Theatre Press.
- (1979) Babes in the Bighouse: A Documentary Fantasy Musical about Life inside a Women's Prison. Omaha Magic Theatre Press.
- (1979) Brazil Fado: You're Always with Me. Omaha Magic Theatre Press.
- (1979) Women's Prison. Omaha Magic Theatre Press.
- (1979) Attempted Rescue on Avenue B: A Beat Fifties Comic Opera. Omaha Magic Theatre Press.
- (1978) American King's English for Queens. Omaha Magic Theatre Press.
- (1978) 100,001 Horror Stories of the Plains. Omaha Magic Theatre Press.
- (1977) Sleazing toward Athens. Omaha Magic Theatre Press.
- (1974) Fifteen Million Fifteen Year Olds (musical). Omaha Magic Theatre Press.
- (1974) Henna for Endurance. Omaha Magic Theatre Press.
- (1974) Hospital Play. Omaha Magic Theatre Press.

Earlier, unpublished productions include the musicals "Choose A Spot On The Floor" (1971) and "Stranger Than Spending A Night In A Fort Dodge Truck Stop" (1972).

== Publications about the Omaha Magic Theatre ==
- Klein, Jeanne (1988) Megan Terry's Plays for Youth at the Omaha Magic Theatre. Paper presented at the Joint Annual Meeting of the American Alliance for Theatre and Education and the Association for Theatre and Disability (Portland, OR, August 2–6, 1988). ERIC # ED301902.

== See also ==
- Theatre in Omaha
