= Viet Rock =

- Music: Marianne de Pury
- Book: Megan Terry
- Productions: 1966 La MaMa Experimental Theatre Club; 1966 Yale Repertory Theatre; 1966 Off-Broadway

Viet Rock is a rock musical by Megan Terry that served as inspiration to the musical Hair. A violent denunciation of the American involvement in the Vietnam War, the play was described by its author as a "folk war movie" comprising scenes of disillusionment and protest to the American military presence in Southeast Asia. Viet Rock is widely considered to be the first rock musical written and performed in the United States, as well as the first protest play about Vietnam. Its premiere also marks the first major theatre production in the United States in which actors left the stage to interact directly with the audience.

The play was initially developed in 1965 and 1966 during collaborative workshops at New York City's The Open Theater under the leadership of Joseph Chaikin and Peter Feldman. The company performed improvisations based on accounts of the Vietnam War, and Terry wrote and directed a full-length show based on these improvisations. The music was composed by Marianne de Pury, who developed the songs during the workshops. It opened at La MaMa Experimental Theatre Club on May 18, 1966.

The play then had a two-week run at the Yale Repertory Theatre before its off-Broadway premiere at the Martinique Theatre on November 10, 1966. It closed at the Martinique on December 31 after 62 performances.

The play was also performed at the University of Arkansas, Fayetteville, directed by R. J Quinn in 1973. It was a bold move by Quinn to state his objection to the war at the time as it had no foreseen end and the University had a ROTC program fully supported by the University administration.

One of the leading cast members was Gerome Ragni, who would go on to create the musical Hair with fellow actor James Rado. In developing Hair, Ragni borrowed the anti-war theme, as well as the experimental technique of improvisational exercises, from the production of Viet Rock.

== Publication ==
Viet Rock is published by Broadway Play Publishing Inc. in the collection Plays By Megan Terry.

== See also ==
- List of plays with anti-war themes
