= Jean-Claude van Itallie =

Belgian-born American playwright (1936–2021)

- Born: May 25, 1936; Brussels, Belgium
- Died: September 9, 2021 (aged 85); New York, United States
- Citizenship: American
- Occupations: Playwright, educator
- Organization: The Open Theatre

Jean-Claude van Itallie (May 25, 1936 – September 9, 2021) was a Belgian-born American playwright, performer, and theatre workshop teacher. He is best known for his 1966 anti-Vietnam War play America Hurrah; The Serpent, an ensemble play he wrote with Joseph Chaikin's Open Theatre; his theatrical adaptation of the Tibetan Book of the Dead; and his translations of Anton Chekhov's plays.

== Early life and education ==
Van Itallie was born in Brussels, Belgium on May 25, 1936, to Hugo Ferdinand van Itallie (an investment banker) and Marthe Mathilde Caroline Levy van Itallie. His family was Jewish. In 1940, when the Nazis invaded Brussels, he fled with his family to France, where they received visas to Portugal from the Portuguese consul Aristides de Sousa Mendes. They stayed in Estoril, at the Pensão Royal, between 8 July and 28 September 1940. On the same day, they boarded the S.S. Hakozaki Maru headed for New York City, arriving on 10 October. Van Itallie grew up in Great Neck, New York, studied at Great Neck High School and Deerfield Academy in Deerfield, Massachusetts, and graduated from Harvard College in 1958. He has one sibling, his brother Michael van Itallie.

== Career ==
After graduating from Harvard, van Itallie moved to Greenwich Village, studied acting at The Neighborhood Playhouse and film editing at New York University, and wrote for the CBS television program Look Up and Live. In 1963, van Itallie's short play, War, was produced at the Barr Albee Wilder Playwrights Unit on Vandam Street, featuring Gerome Ragni and Jane Lowry and directed by Michael Kahn. War was later produced alongside John Guare's Muzeeka at the Dallas Theater Center. Van Itallie joined director-actor Joseph Chaikin's Open Theater as Playwright-of-the Ensemble. Van Itallie's early plays were also produced at Ellen Stewart's Café La MaMa, and at Joe Cino's Caffe Cino, "birthplace of gay theater."

His 1966 anti-war trilogy, America Hurrah (Interview, TV, and Motel), ran for almost two years at the Pocket Theater Off-Broadway and at the Royal Court Theater in London. Two of the one-acts were first presented at La MaMa Experimental Theatre Club in 1964 and 1965. Interview was directed by Peter Feldman, and Motel was directed by Michael Kahn. Motel was revived at La MaMa in 1981, again directed by Kahn, for the theater's 20th anniversary.

In 1972, he wrote the script for a gay pornographic film America Creams under a pseudonym, one of the first well-known writers to write a hardcore pornographic film.

Van Itallie has written over thirty plays. He wrote the ensemble play The Serpent with Chaikin's Open Theater. The Serpent premiered at Rome's Teatro dell'Arte in 1968. Van Itallie's Tibetan Book of the Dead, or How Not to Do It Again, based on the Bardo Thodol and with music by Steven Gorn, premiered at La MaMa in 1983.

Other van Itallie plays include:

- Dream (produced at La MaMa in 1965)
- King of the United States (a musical written with composer Richard Peaslee; premiered at Theater for the New City, 1972)
- Bag Lady (premiered at Theater for the New City, 1979)
- Naropa (produced at La MaMa in 1982 with music by Steven Gorn)
- The Traveler (about a composer struck with aphasia; premiered at Mark Taper Forum in Los Angeles, 1987 produced at Almeida Theater in London with David Threlfall, 1988)
- Struck Dumb (written for and with Joseph Chaikin, premiered at Taper Too in Los Angeles, 1989; anthologized in Best American Short Plays, 1991–92)
- Light (about Voltaire, Emilie du Chatelet, and Frederick the Great; premiered at Boston Court Theater in Pasadena, 2003; received several Los Angeles critics awards)
- Fear Itself, Secrets of the White House (premiered at Theater for the New City, 2006)

In January 1967, van Itallie's Pavane was broadcast along with Sam Shepard's Fourteen Hundred Thousand and Paul Foster's The Recluse as "La MaMa Playwrights" on NET Playhouse. The program was re-broadcast on NET in 1969 along with footage from the opening of La MaMa's new theater space.

Van Itallie's translation of Chekhov's The Seagull was first produced at the McCarter Theater in Princeton in 1973. It then premiered at the Manhattan Theater Club and the American Repertory Theatre in Cambridge, Massachusetts. His translation of The Cherry Orchard premiered at Lincoln Center, featuring Irene Worth and Meryl Streep and directed by Andrei Serban, in 1977. His translation of Three Sisters premiered both at the American Repertory Theatre and at the Manhattan Theatre Club, featuring Sam Waterston and Dianne Wiest, in 1979. His translation of Uncle Vanya premiered at La MaMa, featuring F. Murray Abraham and Chaikin and directed by Serban, in 1983.

In 1997, van Itallie performed with co-creators Kermit Dunkelberg and Court Dorsey in Guys Dreamin', as directed by Kim Mancuso and Joel Gluck. In 1999 and 2000, van Itallie performed his one-man show War, Sex, and Dreams at Highways in Santa Monica and at La MaMa. In 2012, he performed his one-man show Confessions and Conversation at La MaMa, as directed by Rosemary Quinn.

His 2016 book, Tea with Demons – Games of Transformation, includes memoir and forty-nine self-development games for the reader to play. He taught writing and performance workshops, and has taught at Princeton University, New York University, Harvard University, Yale University, Amherst College, Columbia University, Middlebury College, the University of Colorado, Smith College, the New School for Social Research, Naropa University, the Esalen Institute, the Omega Institute for Holistic Studies, the New York Open Center, Rowe Conference Center, and Easton Mountain, among other universities and retreat centers.

He lived on a farm in western Massachusetts, where he taught and directed the Shantigar Foundation for theatre and meditation, and in Greenwich Village and NoHo. His papers are held in Kent State University Special Collections. The papers cover van Itallie's full career, and he would regularly deposit additional items to the collection.

== Selected plays ==
- War
- Almost Like Being
- I'm Really Here
- Hunter and the Bird
- America Hurrah
- The Serpent
- King of the United States
- Ancient Boys
- Mystery Play, premiered at Cherry Lane Theater, NYC, 1973
- The Traveler
- Struck Dumb (co-written with Joseph Chaikin)
- Bag Lady
- Tibetan Book of the Dead or How Not to Do It Again
- Light, Voltaire, the Mathematician, and the King of Prussia
- Fear Itself, Secrets of the White House
- A Fable
- Master and Margarita (from the Mikhail Bulgakov novel)
- The Mother's Return (premiered at La MaMa in 2010)

Translations:

- Chekhov's The Seagull, Uncle Vanya, Three Sisters, and The Cherry Orchard
- Jean Genet's The Balcony
- Eugene Ionesco's The Taming of Jacques
- Euripides' Medea

== Books ==
- Chekhov, the Major Plays. Applause Books, 1995.
- The Playwright's Workbook. Applause Books, 1997.
- Tibetan Book of the Dead for Reading Aloud. North Atlantic Books, 1998.
- America Hurrah and Other Plays. Grove Press, 2001.
- Tea with Demons - Games of Transformation. Haley's Publishing, 2016.

== Awards and recognition ==
- Rockefeller Foundation grant, 1962–1963
- Jersey Journal award for America Hurrah, 1967
- Outer Circle Critics Award for America Hurrah, 1967
- Vernon Rice-Drama Desk Award for America Hurrah, 1967
- Obie Award for The Serpent, 1969
- Guggenheim Fellowship, 1973-1974 and 1980–1981
- Creative Artists Public Service Award, 1975
- Honorary Doctorate in Philosophy, Kent State University, 1977
- Ford Foundation grant, 1979
- Playwrights Award from the National Endowment for the Arts, 1986
- United Stroke Foundation achievement award for The Traveler, 1987
- Last Frontier Theater Lifetime Achievement Award - Distinguished Service in the Theater, 1999
- New England Theater Conference - Outstanding Achievement in the American Theater, 2002
