= Megan Terry =

American dramatist (1932–2023)

- Born: Marguerite Duffy; July 22, 1932; Seattle, Washington, U.S.
- Died: April 12, 2023 (aged 90); Omaha, Nebraska, U.S.
- Education: Banff School of Fine Arts; Cert. of Acting and Directing (1952); University of Washington; Bachelor of Education (1952)
- Occupation: Playwright
- Organizations: The Open Theater; Magic Theatre (Omaha)
- Notable work: Viet Rock (1966); Approaching Simone (1970)
- Awards: Obie Award for Best Play; • Approaching Simone (1970); Dramatists Guild Award (1983); College of Fellows of the American Theatre (1994)

Marguerite Duffy (July 22, 1932 – April 12, 2023), known professionally as Megan Terry, was an American playwright, screenwriter, and theatre artist.

Terry produced over fifty works for theater, radio, and television, and is best known for her avant-garde theatrical work from the 1960s. As a founding member of The Open Theater, she developed an actor-training and character-creation technique known as "transformation". She used this technique to create her 1966 work Viet Rock, which was both the first rock musical and the first play to address the war in Vietnam.

== Life and work ==
=== Early life and education ===
Terry was born, as Marguerite Duffy, to Marguerite (née Henry) and businessman Harold Joseph in Seattle, Washington. She first showed an interest in the theatre after attending a play at the age of seven. She wrote, "I went and I looked at the stage and I fell madly in love... I knew I wanted to do that, whatever it was." As a child, she wrote, directed, and designed sets for productions staged in the backyard of her family's home, earning her the nicknames "Tallulah Blackhead" and "Sarah Heartburn" from her father. He was not pleased by her interest in theatre.

After years of participating in school plays, Terry became a member of the Seattle Repertory Playhouse during her senior year in high school. The liberal politics and activist attitudes of the company's directors, Florence and Burton James, had an effect on her view of theatre in society. She has credited their influence, as well as the 1951 closure of the Seattle Repertory Playhouse under pressure from the House Un-American Activities Committee, for her later use of political commentary on stage.

Terry went on to earn a scholarship to the Banff School of Fine Arts in Alberta, Canada, where she received certificates in theatre directing, design, and acting. While there, she took psychology and sociology courses at the University of Alberta, and served as technical director for the Edmonton Children's Theater, where she became interested in theatre as a tool for youth education. Midway through her degree program, Terry was forced to return to Seattle when her grandfather became seriously ill. She finished her degree at the University of Washington, where she was awarded a Bachelor of Education degree in 1952.

After graduation, she decided to focus on theatre for children and began teaching at Seattle's oldest performance conservatory, the Cornish School of Allied Arts. She also organized her first ensemble, the Cornish Players. At this time, she was writing a series of controversial short plays for youth dealing with issues like sex and politics, and adopted a pseudonym to shield her professional career as a playwright from her more conservative colleagues. She chose the name Megan because it was the Celtic root for Marguerite, and Terry in homage to the nineteenth-century actress Ellen Terry.

=== New York City, The Open Theater, and Viet Rock ===
Terry faced backlash for the edginess of her earliest plays, Beach Grass (1955) and Go Out and Move the Car (1955). She became increasingly frustrated with creative and political restraint in the Seattle theatre community, and decided to move to New York City. Once there, she continued writing plays dealing with social and political issues, including The Magic Realist (1960), which uses vaudeville techniques to burlesque the inequity of a capitalistic economic power structure on individuals, families, and criminal justice, and Ex-Miss Copper Queen on a Set of Pills, the story of an ex-beauty queen who has begun working as a prostitute to support her drug addiction. Ex-Miss Copper Queen on a Set of Pills opened in 1963 at Edward Albee's Playwrights Unit Workshop. Despite the success of these early productions, Terry had to support herself by working as an actress in television serials.

In her free time, she began forming connections in the theatre community, including with fellow playwright Maria Irene Fornes and director Joseph Chaikin. Chaikin was then working with The Living Theatre. Terry and Chaikin, together with Peter Feldman and Barbara Vann, founded The Open Theater in 1963. The Open Theater was a cooperative that progressed from a closed experimental laboratory to an ensemble. The Open Theater used the methods of the worldwide collective theater movement and was particularly inspired by the work of the acting teacher, Nola Chilton, and the innovator of theater games, Viola Spolin.

Along with her colleagues at The Open Theater, Terry began working on exercises to produce a new kind of collaborative performance based on a "radical program of communal engagement in the nonhierarchical and collaborative ensemble" that viewed the concept of a "play" as a continuing process rather than an end product. The resulting productions exhibited sudden changes in mood, time, or character meant to disrupt the audience's sense of immersion and focus on creating a changing emotional state. These techniques resulted in a theatre experience that feminist scholar Rebecca Bell-Metereau described as filled with "... earthy language, sexual and political content, musical segments, humor, and vaudeville touches [that] all blend to create lively, dynamic experiences for audiences."

Terry's most significant contribution to The Open Theater's growing repertoire of exercises was "transformation", in which the actors would improvise overheard dialogue in an effort to "transform" into characters coping with various situations. These exercises fueled Terry's work as she and the company produced such plays as Keep Tightly Closed in a Cool Dry Place at the Sheridan Square Playhouse and Gloaming, Oh My Darling at the Martinique Theater, both in 1965. The self-guided theatre experiments were cut short by the ensemble's outrage at the United States' decision to go to war with Vietnam. In protest, Terry and her ensemble began work on what would become Viet Rock:

Just as we were on the brink of major breakthroughs in acting, playwriting, and directing, we had to throw all our energies into stopping the war in Viet Nam. Much work got postponed, other work accelerated out of the necessity of dealing with the problem of war. That's how Viet Rock came into being, out of necessity. Women playing men—the actresses as Vietnamese happened because we didn't have enough men in the company, and those we had were constantly leaving for paying jobs.

As the first rock musical to be written and performed in the United States, and the first play to address America's involvement in Vietnam, Viet Rock was a landmark production for both The Open Theater and Terry as a playwright. The collectively-created piece evolved from workshop improvisations in The Open Theater laboratory, with music by Marianne de Pury. The musical premiered off-off Broadway at La MaMa Experimental Theatre Club and had a preview run at the Yale Repertory Theatre before opening off-Broadway at the Martinique Theatre on November 10, 1966.

Terry described Viet Rock as a "folk war movie" about the "futilities and irrelevancies" of war and the "nightmares, fantasies, regrets, terrors, confusions" of the Vietnam War. Viet Rock conveys "the bombardment of impressions we get from the mass media" along with firsthand testimonials about the war. Following the lives of seven soldiers on the front lines, the predominantly female cast juxtaposed intimate scenes, like a boy crawling on his belly and saying, "I can't wait till I get there and make a killing on the black market!" with actors performing up-tempo rock numbers like "Let's go gay with L.B.J.!" Similar to the "transformation" exercises done earlier in workshops, Viet Rock collected the personal stories of veterans and incorporated them into a satirical antiwar testimonial with a rock and roll soundtrack. Richard Schechner described Viet Rock as "Elizabethan in scope and tone". Some praised the vigor of the play's social protest, while others did not. New York Times critic Walter Kerr called the musical "truly distressing" and "an essentially thoughtless from-the-gut-only noise."

Cast member Gerome Ragni borrowed Terry's anti-war theme, improvisational technique, and rock and roll aesthetic to create the musical Hair with fellow actor James Rado. Canadian playwright Gary Botting noted, "It is fair to say that Viet Rock was unrivaled in popularity on off-off-Broadway until the advent of the rock musical that was directed by the same man, the rock musical that appeared to take the world by storm: Hair."

=== Later career ===
Following the mixed reviews of Viet Rock, which was translated and produced internationally, Terry left New York and The Open Theater. She moved to Minnesota and became the writer-in-residence for Minneapolis' Firehouse Theater, where she had previously been a Rockefeller Fellow during the development of Keep Tightly Closed in a Cool Dry Place.

Terry's play Jack Jack, at the Firehouse Theater, was a hit for the experimental or avant-garde theater — running longer than any play since the theater opened in 1963. The play tells the story of a boy named Danny, who pursues the American ideals of life, liberty, and the pursuit of happiness; and a giant named Jack Jack, who represents death, oppression, and violence. It is subtitled "A Trip", which, according to The New York Times review, "in the psychedelic sense, it is", adding:

Yes, there is a nude scene in Jack Jack, and it is far more explicit than anything on the New York stage this season. But at the same time, it is so much like a classical painting come to life — of nymphs and satyrs frolicking on the green — that no one in Minneapolis seems to have objected loudly enough to attract the censors.

For several years, Terry split her time between theatre in Minnesota and commissions for television and public radio, including the program Home: Or Future Soap (1968). She did return to New York City to develop new plays such as Changes (1968) at La MaMa Experimental Theatre Club, St. Hydro Clemency, and Massachusetts Trust, all directed by Tom O'Horgan.

Approaching Simone (1970), Terry's play about the twentieth-century French feminist philosopher Simone Weil, won the 1969/1970 Obie Award for Best Off-Broadway Play. Terry took a stronger interest in women's issues after the production of Approaching Simone and began working to increase the visibility of women in theatre. Along with Fornes, Rosalyn Drexler, Julie Bovasso, Adrienne Kennedy, and Rochelle Owens, Terry founded New York's Women's Theater Council in 1972. Though the council was short-lived, it served as a consciousness-raising organization early in the development of 1970's feminist theatre, and facilitated the authorship of numerous important feminist plays. While in New York, Terry reconnected with Chaikin and The Open Theater to work with fellow playwrights Sam Shepard and Jean-Claude van Itallie on the company's final production, Nightwalk, in 1973. Following this production, Terry again left New York and settled at the Magic Theatre in Omaha, Nebraska, where she remained as playwright-in-residence and literary manager for the remainder of her career.

In recognition of her achievements and innovations in the theatre, Terry was elected to lifetime membership in the College of Fellows of the American Theatre in 1994. Her other awards have included the 1983 Dramatists Guild Award, an Academy of Theatre Arts Silver Medal for "distinguished contributions to, and service in, the American theatre", a Yale and a Guggenheim Fellowship, a Robert Chesley Award, two Rockefeller Foundation grants, and a National Endowment for the Arts literature fellowship.

Many of her plays are available from Alexander Street Press, and some are available at the Rutgers Drama Library.

=== Death ===
Megan Terry died in Omaha, Nebraska on April 12, 2023, at the age of 90.

== Selected works ==
=== Theatre ===
- 1955: Beach Grass – Seattle, Washington
- 1955: Go Out and Move the Car - Seattle, Washington
- 1955: Seascape – Seattle, Washington
- 1961: New York Comedy - Saratoga Springs, New York
- 1963: Ex-Miss Copper Queen on a Set of Pills - Sheridan Square Playhouse, New York City
- 1963: Eat at Joe's - The Open Theater, New York City
- 1963: When My Girlfriend Was Still All Flowers – The Open Theater, New York City
- 1964: Calm Down Mother – Sheridan Square Playhouse, New York City
- 1965: Keep Tightly Closed in a Cool, Dry Place – Firehouse Theatre, Minneapolis
- 1966: The Magic Realists – La MaMa Experimental Theatre Club and Sheridan Square Playhouse, New York City
- 1966: Comings and Goings – La MaMa Experimental Theatre Club
- 1966: In the Gloaming, Oh My Darling – Martinique Theater
- 1966: Viet Rock: A Folk War Movie (music by Marianne de Pury) – La MaMa Experimental Theatre Club and Martinique Theater and The Open Theater, New York City (published by Broadway Play Publishing in Plays by Megan Terry)
- 1967: The People vs. Ranchman – La MaMa Experimental Theatre Club (produced by the Firehouse Theatre, Minneapolis)
- 1968: Massachusetts Trust – Spingold Theater, Brandeis University, Waltham, Massachusetts
- 1968: Changes – directed by Tom O'Horgan at La MaMa Experimental Theatre Club
- 1968: Keep Tightly Closed in a Cool Dry Place – La MaMa Experimental Theatre Club
- 1968: Jack Jack – Firehouse Theater, Minneapolis, directed by Sydney Walter
- 1970: Approaching Simone - La MaMa Experimental Theatre Club and Boston University Theater, Boston, Massachusetts (published by Broadway Play Publishing in Plays by Megan Terry)
- 1973: Couplings and Groupings
- 1973: Nightwalk (with Sam Shepard and Jean-Claude van Itallie) – The Open Theater, New York City
- 1974: Babes In The Bighouse – Magic Theater, Omaha, Nebraska (published by Broadway Play Publishing in Plays by Megan Terry)
- 1974: Hothouse
- 1974: Calm Down Mother and The Gloaming, Oh My Darling – La MaMa Experimental Theatre Club
- 1978: American King's English for Queens
- 1979: Attempted Rescue on Avenue B: A Beat Fifties Comic Opera
- 1979: Goona Goona – Magic Theater, Omaha, Nebraska (published by Broadway Play Publishing)
- 1982: Molly Bailey's Traveling Family Circus: Featuring Scenes from the Life of Mother Jones
- 1985: Objective Love I - Magic Theater, Omaha, Nebraska (published by Broadway Play Publishing, 2012)
- 1990–1992: Star Path Moon Stop - written and toured for Magic Theatre
- 1992: Sanibel and Captiva – Cesear's Forum, a minimalist theatre company, staged the radio play on a double bill with James Prideaux's Lemonade, Heartland Cafe Studio Theater, Chicago, Illinois
- 1995: No Kissing in Hall – commissioned by J. Larson of Rose Theatre, Omaha, Nebraska

=== Television ===
- 1955: The Dirt Boat – KING-TV, Seattle, Washington
- 1968: Home or Future Soap (directed by Glenn Jordan) – Channel 13 New York City
- 1969: One More Little Drinkie – Channel 13 New York City

=== Radio plays ===
- 1968: Sanibel and Captiva (radio play produced on national radio by PBS-Boston)
- 1972: American Wedding Ritual Monitored/Transmitted by the Planet Jupiter
- 1974: Home: Or Future Soap
