= The Open Theater =

Defunct American experimental theatre group

The Open Theater was an experimental theatre group in New York City, active from 1963 to 1973.

== Foundation ==
The Open Theater was founded in New York City by a group of former students of acting teacher Nola Chilton, together with director Joseph Chaikin (formerly of The Living Theatre), Peter Feldman, Megan Terry, and Sam Shepard. Joseph Chaikin had just left the Living Theater, following the arrest of Julian Beck and Judith Malina for tax evasion. He felt that the Living Theater had become less interested in artistic exploration and experimentation, and more interested in political activism and he felt that actors needed specific training to do the sorts of pieces that the Living Theater did. The group's intent was to continue Chilton's exploration of a "post-method", post-absurd acting technique, by way of a collaborative and wide-ranging process that included exploration of political, artistic, and social issues, which were felt to be critical to the success of avant-garde theatre. The company, developing work through an improvisational process drawn from Chilton and Viola Spolin, created well-known exercises, such as "sound and movement" and "transformations", and originated radical forms and techniques that anticipated or were contemporaneous with Jerzy Grotowski's "poor theater" in Poland. According to playwright Megan Terry, the notion of a minimalist aesthetic was fueled by the company's quest to achieve narrative insight and political accountability through the body of the actor:

During the sixties we were concerned with stripping away. Chaikin and the Open Theater actors worked to reveal the actor's imagination as projected by the actor's presence. We showed that full, exciting theatrical productions could be done with nothing but actors and two benches or four chairs or only a bare stage. It was not only a matter of economics, it was essential to demonstrate the profound power of the actor's imagination and the actor's ability to create place; i.e. scenery through the power of belief via total technique and through the use of transformation not only of character but of time and place.

The Open Theater formed as an offshoot of the Living Theater. The Living Theater initially divided because actor Joseph Chaikin felt that the troupe had become less interested in artistic exploration and experimentation, and more interested in political activism. He felt that actors needed specific training to do the sorts of pieces that the Living Theater did.

== Theatrical explorations ==
Chaikin was interested in the personal experience of the actor, and of the actor's relationship to the rest of the community. He developed improvisational exercises designed to help the actor become freer. The technique was initially inspired by method acting, in which the actor draws on his or her own experiences and emotions, but the goal of Chaikin's work was to free the actor from the natural restraints of method acting. He called his technique the "sound and movement" technique. In his book entitled The Presence of the Actor, Chaikin wrote "Traditional acting in America has become a blend of that same kind of synthetic 'feeling' and sentimentality which characterizes the Fourth of July parade, Muzak, church services, and political campaigns." This further explains the purpose for the Open Theater and the reasoning behind opening such a space.

== Ensemble work ==
Chaikin used ensemble casts as a way to explore the relationship between the actor and the outside world. He relied on the performers to interact not as characters in fictional settings, but as real people in real situations. While the Living Theater's ensemble was very external and audience oriented, Chaikin's was internal and oriented within the troupe itself. In 1963, Chaikin said "Working together, we teach ourselves." The ensemble worked in the "poor theater" style. There was no need for sets, costumes, props, or any of the other theatrical elements. There were no moving lights, only enough stationary light to be able to see. There was no music, instead, the actors would use their voices to create the sound effects. There were hardly any aspects of "rich" theater involved.

On his reasons for using ensembles instead of a traditional cast and show, Chaikin said:

I felt a terrific longing for a kind of ensemble. I wanted to play with actors, actors who felt a sensitivity for one another... In order to come to a vocabulary, we had to teach each other: we had no ambitions other than to meet and play around... Off-off Broadway's impulse was a terrific dissatisfaction with what is possible on Broadway... Off-off broadway is really an attack on the fourth wall. I want to destroy the fourth-wall business. I have difficulty believing most of what happens on Broadway. Mary Martin's like a character in a television commercial: nobody'’s like that.

== Location ==
The ensemble met on Spring Street in Lower Manhattan in a warehouse.

== Disbanding and further works ==
Chaikin disbanded the Open Theater in 1973, amid fears that it was becoming too institutionalized. He later went to work for the Public Theater. Chaikin continued to create workshops, but he was increasingly working on mainstream projects.

== Productions ==
During the first two years of its existence, there were no productions performed by the Open Theater. Instead, there were occasional open rehearsals or workshops.

The first major production was The Serpent, which toured both nationally and internationally. The production employed unconventional theatre techniques based on improvisation. According to the playwright Jean Claude Van Itallie, a member of the company, the piece was conceived with the idea that the actors would act as priests whose congregation dealt with profound questions: where does evil come from? What provokes people to commit murder? Is it possible to maintain innocence within a contaminated world? Though most of the piece is performed through choreographed movement, mime, human sound effects and hand-held instruments, there is text as well coming directly from the Bible along with a number of speeches written exclusively for the show.

The plot of The Serpent takes an extremely non-direct route in order to answer these questions. The play opens with a group of actors onstage where one recites a graphic description of an autopsy while the other members of the group are creating different sound effects and movements that match the text. Then the remaining members of the ensemble join the stage to partake in a stylized re-enactment of the John F. Kennedy assassination. One actor counts slowly to twelve while the other actors partake in the re-enactment in slow motion, moving to a new position and new sound effect per count. This scene is run forward, backwards, and out of order to the point that it becomes so ritualized that there is now an element of comedy in play within this depiction of someone's untimely death. There is a sense of realization of how the horror of the murder rushes over the ensemble as they break free from their rigid formation and become instead a group of individuals fleeing from the evil that has just occurred. The ensemble then moves to the retelling of the banishment of Adam and Eve from the Garden of Eden. Four actors take the shape of the serpent that convinces Eve to eat the forbidden fruit and are present as Eve then moves to convince Adam to partake of it. After being banished by God from the Garden, the actors then partake in a ritual enactment of the first true discovery of sexual love which takes place alongside a recitation of how the descendants of Adam begat the rest of mankind. This passionate celebration of sexuality is very much embraced onstage. The ensemble eventually collapses slowly to the floor when, at first, a hum falls over the group which soon turns into song. They eventually rise to their feet and travel down the aisles embracing audience members and smiling until the song is complete.

The Serpent aims to remind the audience of the idea that we are all caught in a neverending battle between the fact that we are neither as innocent nor as guilty as we may think we might be, having fallen victim to the at times foul planet that we reside on. The goal of the play was not to find answers the specific questions which were asked, but rather to visualize these inquiries through improvisation and to help the actors, as well as the audience members, to find their own personal truths.

Some of the company's best known works include Terry's Viet Rock (1966) with musical compositions by Marianne de Pury, Jean-Claude van Itallie's America Hurrah (1966) and The Serpent (1969).

Other works included Endgame, American Hurrah, The Mutation Show, Nightwalk, and Terminal.

Members of the theatre simulated an orgy in Death Valley in a scene in the 1970 movie Zabriskie Point. The U.S. Justice Department later investigated the film questioning whether the orgy violated the Mann Act which criminalized the interstate transport of females for "immoral purposes". However, the movie producers pointed out that no actual sex had taken place and that the actors had not crossed a state line since the town of Zabriskie Point is in California.

After the company's dissolution, its members formed The Talking Band, and Medicine Show Theatre Ensemble and Spiderwoman Theater. Chaikin went on to have a celebrated career as a theatre director until his death in 2003.
