= List of playwrights from the United States =

Notable playwrights from the United States include:

== 18th century ==
- Hugh Henry Brackenridge
- William Dunlap
- Robert Hunter
- Royall Tyler
- Mercy Otis Warren

== 19th century ==
- George Aiken
- Nathaniel Bannister
- James Nelson Barker
- David Belasco
- Eva Best
- Robert Montgomery Bird
- George H. Boker
- Dion Boucicault
- John Brougham
- William Wells Brown
- Bob Cole
- Robert T. Conrad
- Augustin Daly
- Sidney R. Ellis
- Anna M. Fitch
- Clyde Fitch
- Edward Harrigan
- Grace Hayward
- James A. Herne
- Bronson Howard
- William Dean Howells
- Charles H. Hoyt
- Henry James
- Cornelius Ambrosius Logan
- Steele MacKaye
- Frederick G. Maeder
- Fred Marsden
- Cornelius Mathews
- Harry P. Mawson
- Langdon Elwyn Mitchell
- Anna Cora Mowatt
- John Neal
- John Howard Payne
- Cora Scott Pond Pope
- William W. Pratt
- George W. Ryer
- Robert E. Sherwood
- Harry B. Smith
- Samuel Woodworth
- William Young

== 20th century ==
=== A–G ===
- Zoe Akins
- Edward Albee
- Eva Allen Alberti
- Woody Allen
- Franco Ambriz
- Jane Anderson
- Maxwell Anderson
- Robert Woodruff Anderson
- Maya Angelou
- Jacob M. Appel
- Ray Aranha
- Larry Atlas
- David Auburn
- Jon Robin Baitz
- Amiri Baraka
- Lillian Barrett
- Philip Barry
- Todd Bash
- Jonathan Bayliss
- Douglas Carter Beane
- Jim Beaver
- David Belasco
- Stephen Belber
- Ruth Bellamy
- S. N. Behrman
- David Berry
- Leo Birinski
- Lee Blessing
- Marc Blitzstein
- Eric Bogosian
- Neith Boyce
- Kent Broadhurst
- Eve Brodlique
- Jason Robert Brown
- Ed Bullins
- Percy Jewett Burrell
- Mary P. Burrill
- Abe Burrows
- Sheila Callaghan
- Steve Carter
- Linda Chambers
- Paddy Chayefsky
- Alice Childress
- Frank Chin
- Donald L. Coburn
- George M. Cohan
- Betty Comden
- Constance Congdon
- Marc Connelly
- Kia Corthron
- Jorge Ignacio Cortiñas
- Michael Cristofer
- Rachel Crothers
- Nilo Cruz
- Lisa D'Amour
- Ossie Davis
- Floyd Dell
- John Dempsey
- Steven Dietz
- Owen Dodson
- Tom Donaghy
- Richard Dresser
- John Van Druten
- Paul Laurence Dunbar
- Christopher Durang
- Fred Ebb
- Erik Ehn
- T. S. Eliot
- Will Eno
- Don Evans
- Charles Evered
- Tom Eyen
- Jules Feiffer
- Edna Ferber
- Harvey Fierstein
- Clyde Fitch
- Horton Foote
- María Irene Fornés
- Paul Foster
- Amy Freed
- Ketti Frings
- Charles Fuller
- George Furth
- Herb Gardner
- Jack Gelber
- Alexandra Gersten-Vassilaros
- Alice Gerstenberg
- William Gibson
- D. B. Gilles
- Susan Glaspell
- Andrew Glaze
- Ruth Goetz
- James Goldman
- Frances Goodrich
- Ain Gordon
- Ed Graczyk
- Adolph Green
- Paul Eliot Green
- Richard Greenberg
- Frances Nimmo Greene
- Elana Greenfield
- David Greenspan
- David Grimm
- Rinne Groff
- Laurence Gross
- John Guare
- A. R. Gurney

=== H–M ===
- Albert Hackett
- Elizabeth Forsythe Hailey
- Oscar Hammerstein II
- Stoo Hample
- Lorraine Hansberry
- Sheldon Harnick
- Moss Hart
- Jeffrey Hatcher
- Marcia Haufrecht
- Joseph Hayes
- H. R. Hays
- Ben Hecht
- Lillian Hellman
- Beth Henley
- George Herman
- Hilly Hicks Jr.
- David Hirson
- William M. Hoffman
- Linda Hogan
- Michael Hollinger
- Rupert Holmes
- Avery Hopwood
- Israel Horovitz
- Sidney Howard
- Tina Howe
- Babette Hughes
- Langston Hughes
- David Henry Hwang
- Naomi Iizuka
- William Inge
- Albert Innaurato
- David Ives
- Luigi Jannuzzi
- Arthur M. Jolly
- Preston Jones
- Marc Bamuthi Joseph
- Garson Kanin
- George S. Kaufman
- Moisés Kaufman
- Adrienne Kennedy
- Charles Rann Kennedy
- Stanley Keyes
- Sidney Kingsley
- James Kirkwood Jr.
- Kevin Kling
- Harry Kondoleon
- Arthur Kopit
- Greg Kotis
- Larry Kramer
- Sherry Kramer
- Lisa Kron
- Tony Kushner
- Neil LaBute
- Tina Landau
- Mary Lewis Langworthy
- James Lapine
- Jonathan Larson
- Arthur Laurents
- Jerome Lawrence
- Robert E. Lee
- Warren Leight
- Alan Jay Lerner
- Ira Levin
- David Lindsay-Abaire
- Romulus Linney
- Kenneth Lonergan
- Craig Lucas
- Clare Boothe Luce
- William Luce
- Ken Ludwig
- Charles MacArthur
- Eduardo Machado
- Percy MacKaye
- Archibald MacLeish
- David Mamet
- Emily Mann
- Deb Margolin
- Donald Margulies
- Melanie Marnich
- Jane Martin
- Joe Masteroff
- William Mastrosimone
- Ellen McLaughlin
- James McLure
- Scott McMorrow
- Terrence McNally
- Scott McPherson
- Mark Medoff
- Charles L. Mee
- Leonard Melfi
- Charles Mergendahl
- Marlane Meyer
- George Middleton
- Arthur Miller
- Jason Miller
- Nellie Burget Miller
- Susan Miller
- John Cameron Mitchell
- Langdon Mitchell
- Philip Moeller
- Cherríe Moraga
- Tad Mosel
- Itamar Moses
- Brighde Mullins

=== N–Z ===
- Phyllis Nagy
- N. Richard Nash
- Josefina Niggli
- Marsha Norman
- Bruce Norris
- Lynn Nottage
- Elliott Nugent
- Joyce Carol Oates
- Clifford Odets
- Eugene O'Neill
- Han Ong
- Dael Orlandersmith
- Paul Osborn
- Eric Overmyer
- Rochelle Owens
- William Packard
- Steven Christopher Parker
- Suzan-Lori Parks
- John Patrick
- John Pielmeier
- Miguel Piñero
- David Pinski
- Bernard Pomerance
- Gordon Porterfield
- Craig Pospisil
- Reinaldo Povod
- Toni Press-Coffman
- David Rabe
- Ayn Rand
- Theresa Rebeck
- Keith Reddin
- Ronald Ribman
- Elmer Rice
- Willis Richardson
- Lynn Riggs
- Lawrence Riley
- José Rivera
- Henry Rosendahl
- Paul Rudnick
- Mildred Ruiz-Sapp
- Isabella Russell-Ides
- Stephen Sachs
- Peter Sagal
- Steven Sapp
- William Saroyan
- Saïd Sayrafiezadeh
- Robert Schenkkan
- Murray Schisgal
- John Schneider
- Sarah Schulman
- Sandra Seaton
- Edwin B. Self
- Ntozake Shange
- John Patrick Shanley
- Wallace Shawn
- John Shea
- Claudia Shear
- Edward Sheldon
- Jane Shepard
- Sam Shepard
- Martin Sherman
- Robert B. Sherman
- Robert E. Sherwood
- Christopher Shinn
- Dora Adele Shoemaker
- Del Shores
- Larry Shue
- Nicky Silver
- Neil Simon
- Eric Simonson
- Anna Deavere Smith
- Evan Smith
- Harry B. Smith
- Stephen Sondheim
- Aaron Sorkin
- Jeffrey Stanley
- Wilbur Daniel Steele
- Joseph Stein
- Jean Anderson Sterrett
- Donald Ogden Stewart
- Kelly Stuart
- Jeffrey Sweet
- Jo Swerling
- Megan Terry
- Ernest Thompson
- James Thurber
- Lucy Thurber
- Sophie Treadwell
- Grace Hyde Trine
- Alfred Uhry
- Luis Valdez
- Gore Vidal
- Paula Vogel
- John Walch
- Ian Walker
- Naomi Wallace
- Eugene Walter
- Douglas Turner Ward
- Anne Washburn
- Dale Wasserman
- Wendy Wasserstein
- John Weidman
- George Weller
- Mac Wellman
- Marion Craig Wentworth
- Mae West
- Percival Wilde
- Thornton Wilder
- John Willard
- Samm-Art Williams
- Tennessee Williams
- Beau Willimon
- August Wilson
- Lanford Wilson
- Meredith Willson
- Tracey Scott Wilson
- David Wiltse
- Annie Steger Winston
- Lee Wochner
- George C. Wolfe
- Elizabeth Wong
- Doug Wright
- Chay Yew
- Mary Zimmerman
- Miriam Shomer Zunser

== 21st century ==
- David Adjmi
- Ayad Akhtar
- Annie Baker
- Stephen Belber
- Brooke Berman
- Adam Bock
- Thomas Bradshaw
- George Brant
- Gamal Abdel Chasten
- Vicki Caroline Cheatwood
- John Clancy
- Cusi Cram
- Rick Elice
- Will Eno
- Larissa Fasthorse
- Melissa James Gibson
- Rebecca Gilman
- Gina Gionfriddo
- Brian Griffin
- Stephen Adly Guirgis
- Danai Gurira
- Katori Hall
- Joshua Harmon (playwright)
- Whit Hertford
- Amy Herzog
- Lucas Hnath
- C. J. Hopkins
- Quiara Alegría Hudes
- Samuel D. Hunter
- Branden Jacobs-Jenkins
- Julia Jordan
- Rajiv Joseph
- Aditi Kapil
- Stephen Karam
- Zoe Kazan
- Young Jean Lee
- Tracy Letts
- Simon Levy
- Kirk Lynn
- Taylor Mac
- Mona Mansour
- Melanie Marnich
- Richard Maxwell
- Cary M. Mazer
- Tarell Alvin McCraney
- Lin-Manuel Miranda
- Meg Miroshnik
- Anthony Mora
- Janet Noble
- Bruce Norris
- Dan O'Brien
- Dael Orlandersmith
- Trey Parker
- Laura Pedersen
- David Rambo
- Adam Rapp
- Bert V. Royal
- Sarah Ruhl
- William Ruiz
- Carl Hancock Rux
- John Strand
- Regina Taylor
- Alice Tuan
- Marisa Wegrzyn
- Leah Nanako Winkler
- Craig Wright

== See also ==
- Theater of the United States
- List of American plays
- List of playwrights
- List of playwrights by nationality and year of birth
- List of Jewish American playwrights
