= Stage Fright (1989 film) =

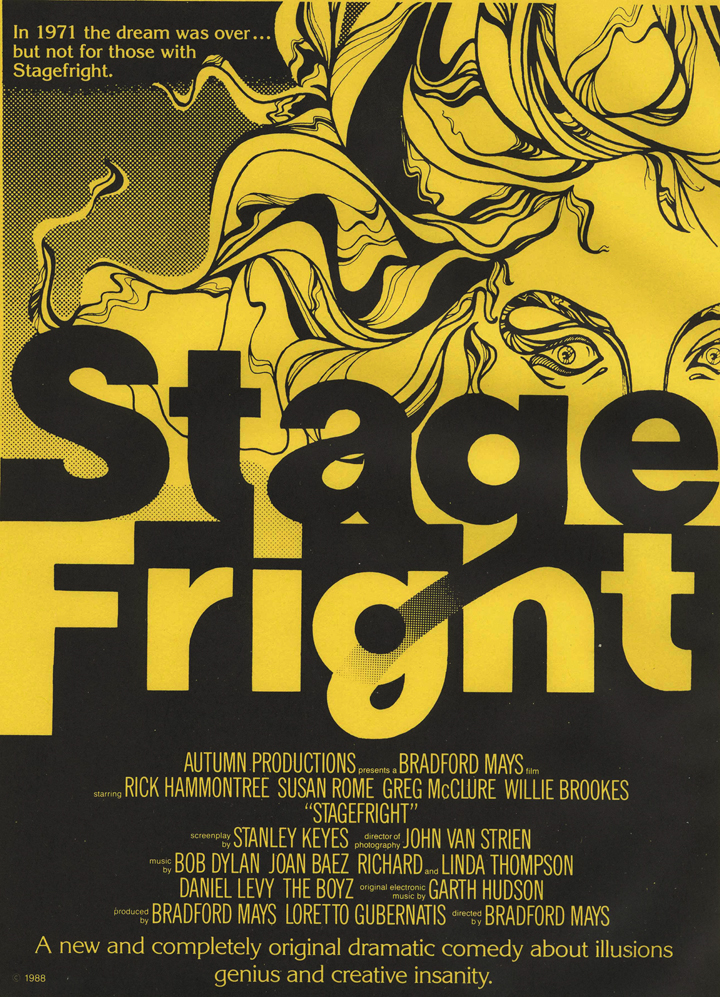
- Directed by: Brad Mays
- Written by: Stanley Keyes
- Produced by: Brad Mays
- Starring: Rick Hammontree; Susan Rome; Greg McClure; David Caltrider; Willie Brooks; Marcy Emmer; Sherry Kemmler; Lisa Green
- Cinematography: John Van Strien
- Edited by: Brad Mays
- Music by: Various Artists
- Release date: 1989
- Running time: 88 minutes
- Country: United States
- Language: English

Stage Fright is a 1989 independent feature film produced and directed by Brad Mays and written by Stanley Keyes. It was director Mays' debut film, and it had its premiere screening at the 1989 Berlin International Film Festival under the auspices of the New York Foundation for the Arts.

It is a fictionalized account of the trials and tribulations of a Baltimore-based experimental theatre company called Storefront Theatre, loosely fashioned after the now-defunct avant-garde theatre company Corner Theatre ETC.

== Background ==
Playwright Stanley Keyes, who had once been associated with Baltimore's Corner Theatre ETC and was now living and working in New York City, approached his friend and fellow Baltimore transplant, director Brad Mays, about working on a film together. The two threw around a number of ideas, finally settling in 1986 on the notion of co-writing a farcical script based on their mutual experiences at Corner Theatre, during the late sixties and early seventies. Corner Theatre ETC was an experimental company, where the offbeat and untried was encouraged, thus attracting a good number of offbeat individuals who were, as often as not, as much interested in kicks as in creating interesting theatre. Keyes and Mays made a list of the various artists from their past who might be successfully fictionalized into a story centered on a new play that is experiencing the sort of difficulties they had both experienced back in their Corner Theatre days. By early 1987, a shooting script had been produced.

== Plot ==
The story revolves around notorious playwright Grayson Osterman (Rick Hammontree), who after a long hiatus, has returned with a shocking new play, Malaise, based a somewhat degenerate reading of The Wonderful Wizard of Oz.The company's director, Broderick Kands (Greg McClure), is based on the director of the film itself, who makes a brief appearance in the opening scene. When one of the play's leading actors has a complete nervous breakdown just three days before opening, the group must recast the role and work around the clock to get the play ready for a much-heralded premiere.

== Cast ==
- Rick Hammontree as Grayson Osterman
- Susan Rome as Laurie Glenn
- Gregory McClure as Broderick Kands (as Greg McClure)
- Marcy Emmer as Frannie Goodman
- David Caltrider as Chuck Pines
- Lisa Green as Janice
- Derek Neal as Skip Scriven
- Arthur Laupus as Crazy Otto
- Nina Ruttlage as Beth
- Aaron Marcus as Jeff
- Martha Saunders as Nurse
- Donna Sherman as Shelly
- James D'Angelo as Dick Rosenbloom

== Misc ==
- "American Independents in Berlin" - The Edge Berlin's Largest English Language Newspaper, Issue 8, February 16-March 1
- American Independents - 1989 Berlin Film Festival - Festival Brochure - Copyright 1989 - page 25
