= Cheatwood =

Cheatwood is a surname. Notable people with the surname include:

- Joel Cheatwood, American television executive
- Jonni Cheatwood (born 1986), Brazilian-American artist
- Tim Cheatwood (born 1978), American football player
- Vicki Caroline Cheatwood, American playwright and screenwriter
