= Gordon Porterfield =

American dramatist (born 20th century

Gordon Porterfield (born 20th century) is an American playwright, novelist, poet and teacher, whose work has been produced for the stage in Baltimore, New York and London.

== Career ==
Gordon Porterfield was the key playwright in residence at Baltimore's Corner Theatre ETC, which was founded in 1968 by Ellen Stewart and Leslie Irons as an experimental theatre whose principal goal was the production of new plays.

Porterfield's output was impressive by any standard, creating dozens of works, both short and full-length. Authors and the apocalyptic The Earth Is Dead – an evening of one-acts under the collective title Ratsfeet – were the first Porterfield plays offered by the theatre, followed with a full-length play Universal Nigger (1969) which told the story of a modern-day African-American Christ, following his movements through the stations of the cross. The production was highly controversial and drew large crowds.

The following year, Brooklyn's Chelsea Theater Center acquired the rights to Universal Nigger and produced it in their own space for New York City audiences, under the direction of Robert Kalfin. Gnomes, a collection of thirteen short one-act plays, was presented the following year. Director Michael Makarovich subsequently staged two Porterfield one-acts at Corner: The Catcher Was a Fag and I and Silence Some Strange Race; as well as an original teleplay entitled Tigers.

In 1972, Corner Theatre presented what many considered Porterfield's defining work for that time – a scatological romp down the Yellow Brick Road entitled whatisoneholycatholicapostalicbrownandstinksuptheunivers.. In 1973, there was the production of another evening of one-acts, entitled Wolves. Chancre, a hallucinatory tour de force, was Porterfield's final offering at the Corner Theatre.

In 1987, The Yippie Book, Porterfield's instructional work for educators, was published by Perfection Form Co. Twelve years later, Porterfield came out of theatrical retirement with the critically acclaimed play Snow, which was performed at the completely reformed version of his old stomping grounds, the Fells Point Corner Theatre.

== See also ==
- List of American novelists
- List of people from Baltimore
- List of playwrights from the United States
- List of poets from the United States

== Related articles ==
- "The Corner Theatre as a Cultural Oasis: Or Will Yosemite Sam Find Happiness in the Vast Sahara Desert?" Performance, Baltimore's Weekly Newspaper on July 13, 1972 (Vol I, #5)
- "The Corner Theatre: Its Audience, Its Intention, Its Future in Baltimore" Baltimore Jewish Times. February 2373
- "A Conversation with Richard Flax" Praxis, Quarterly Publication of the Community College of Baltimore – Winter, 1970 (Vol 3, #2)
