= Stanley Keyes =

American dramatist

- Born: 1948 (age 77–78); Baltimore, Maryland
- Occupations: Playwright, actor

Stanley Keyes is an American playwright, screenwriter, and actor.

== Career ==
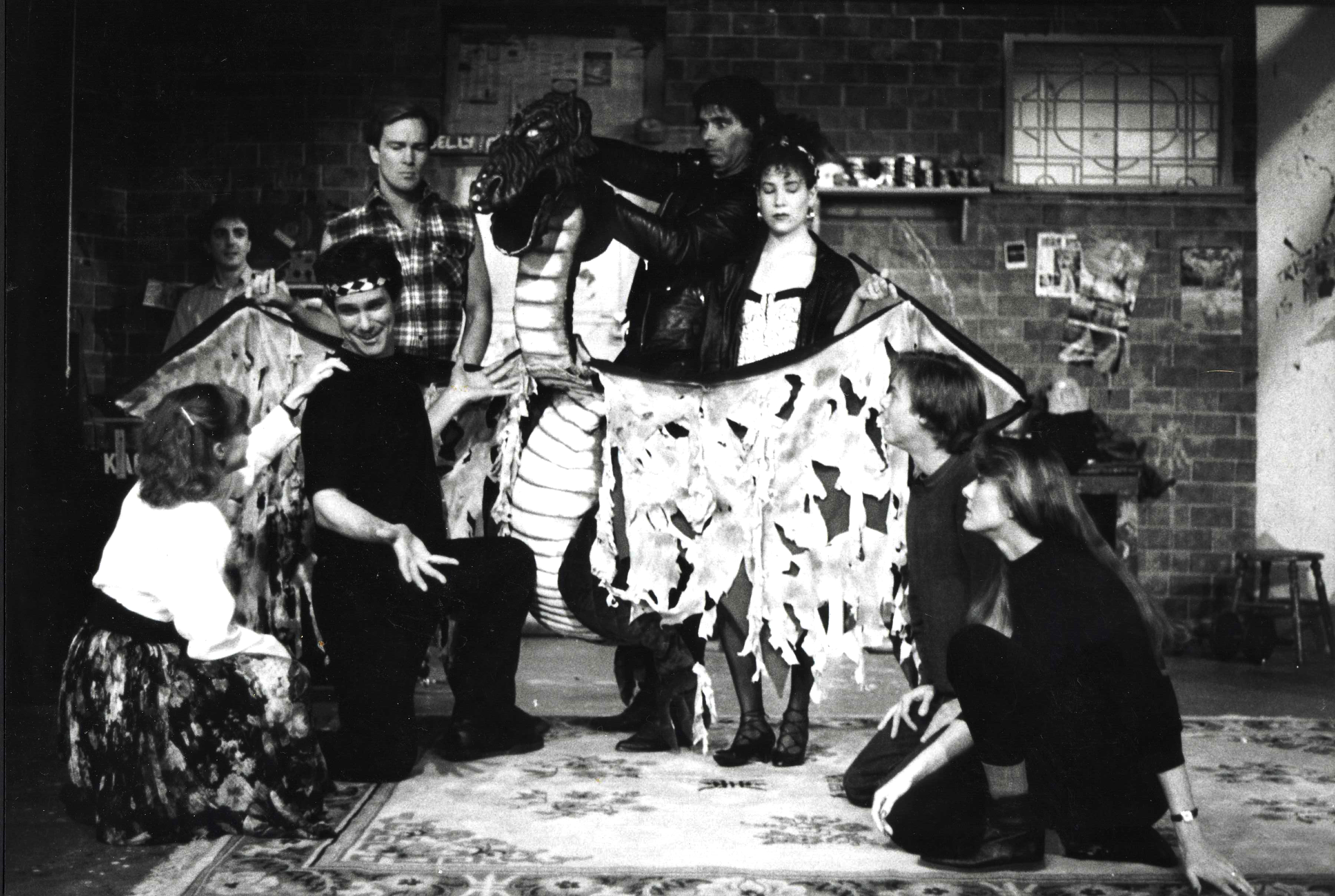
Scene from Keyes' play Dragon Slayers, directed by Brad Mays, Los Angeles, 1990.

Stanley Keyes began his theatre career in Baltimore performing various roles at Theatre Hopkins in the early 1970s. It did not take long for him to become associated with Corner Theatre ETC, an experimental theatre also located in Baltimore, where he continued acting as well as trying his hand at directing and, ultimately, writing plays. In 1975, his first play The Exorcism was performed as part of an evening of one-acts. This was followed up with a full-length play entitled Oil Rich in Mosby, which was noted for the richness of its dialogue. During this time, Keyes continued as both an actor and director, appearing in such works as Tiger Skin and Margeurite, and staging the highly idiosyncratic Gangsters, by Tom Thorton, first at Towson University's theatre department and then at Corner Theatre.

In 1983, Keyes appeared at New York's Theatre Off Park in an off-Broadway production of The Water Hen by Stanislaw Ignacy Witkiewicz, under the direction of Brad Mays. Shortly thereafter, he went to work on a screenplay with the working title of The Return of Grayson Porterhouse.In 1987, the finished script went into production with the new title Stage Fright, again with Mays directing. The independent feature film premiered at the Berlin International Film Festival in 1989.

In March 2000, Stanley Keyes' play Dragon Slayers was presented in Hollywood, California, where it ran for six weeks.

== Related Articles & Misc. ==
- Theatre World, Vol. #40 (1983–1984)
- "American Independents in Berlin" - The Edge Berlin's Largest English Language Newspaper, Issue 8, February 16-March 1
