= Resident Alien (film) =

1990 American documentary film

- Film poster
- Directed by: Jonathan Nossiter
- Produced by: Jonathan Nossiter
- Cinematography: John R. Foster
- Edited by: Jonathan Nossiter
- Production company: Cristp City Production
- Distributed by: Greycat Films
- Release date: 1990
- Running time: 85 minutes
- Country: United States

Resident Alien is a 1990 documentary film about the life of British writer and actor Quentin Crisp. directed, produced and edited by Jonathan Nossiter, and co-produced by Dean Silvers. Resident Alien was Crisp's first documentary; it was followed by Naked in New York in 1994 and The Celluloid Closet in 1995.

It was premiered at Berlin Panorama (part of Berlin International Film Festival) in 1991.

== Synopsis ==
At age 72, Crisp became an Englishman in New York. John Foster's camera follows Crisp about the streets of Manhattan, where Crisp seems very much at home, wearing eye shadow, appearing on a makeshift stage, making and repeating wry observations, talking to John Hurt (who played Crisp in the autobiographical TV movie The Naked Civil Servant), and dining with friends. Others who know Crisp comment on him, on his life as an openly gay man with an effeminate manner, and on his place in the history of gays' social struggle. The portrait that emerges is one of wit and of suffering.

== Cast ==
- Quentin Crisp as himself
- Sting as himself - Singer
- John Hurt as himself - Actor
- Holly Woodlawn as herself - Performer/Actor
- Fran Lebowitz as herself - Writer
- Michael Musto as himself - Gossip Columnist
- Penny Arcade as herself - Performance Artist
- Anne Cumming as herself - Hostess
- Robert Patrick as himself - Playwright
- McDermott & McGough as themselves - Visual Artists
- Franco the Great as himself - Street Artist

== Reception ==
Elanor Ringel wrote in The Atlanta Journal-Constitution that "ultimately Resident Alien is perhaps sadder than Nossiter intended; not simply because Mr. Crisp is frail and lives by himself in a distressingly dingy room, but because his ubiquitous hangers on are so desperate for their 15 minutes of fame." Los Angeles Times film critic Kevin Thomas said the film "offers a perceptive, thoroughly engaging and multilayered portrait of an acerbic and courageous man who once described himself as 'England's stateliest homo'."

Film critic Janet Maslin wrote that "Nossiter's film presents a wistful, rambling, somewhat repetitive portrait of Crisp." She goes on to say that "the film considers his prominence as a prominent gay figure, and raises the question of whether Crisp has been helpful or hurtful to the gay rights movement in presenting his air of helplessness and victimization."

Daniel Neman wrote in the Richmond Times-Dispatch that "the movie pays too much attention to a group of pretentious artists and friends who discuss the influence of Andy Warhol on the world of fame." He further opines that "while Crisp is a worthy subject for a documentary, Nossiter is not always up the task; he doesn't seem to have a focus, so he fills up screen time with endless shots of Crisp walking and director's tricks that only end up annoying."

Betsy Sherman of The Boston Globe observed that "Nossiter's camera takes us into Crisp's cramped room in a Bowery rooming house, where he keeps milk cold on the windowsill and warms up a can of beans on a two burner stove; there's a pathos here – does he really have to live like this – but also a pleasing picture of day-to-day survival." Film critic Christopher Null stated that the "film is ostensibly about why a strange little man decides to uproot his life and move to New York, but it provides no answers."

== Home media ==
The film had its television premiere in June 1998 on the Sundance Channel. The DVD release of the film appeared on 27 September 2005 for Region 1. A new DVD edition was re-released in the US in 2006 by New Video.

== See also ==
- List of LGBTQ-related films
- List of LGBTQ people from New York City
