= The Flaming Idiots =

The Flaming Idiots perform the Chicken Fight trick, Texas Renaissance Festival 1999. Pictured from front to back are Walter, Pyro and Gyro.

The Flaming Idiots were a comedy juggling troupe of three performers: Jon O'Connor, Rob Williams and Kevin Hunt. Their stage names were Pyro, Gyro, and Walter. They began their act as a busking routine in the early 1980s in Dallas and they performed their last show at the New Victory Theater on Broadway in New York City in 2004. The Flaming Idiots created and produced their show as well as performing it.

They gained early popularity by street performing and developing an act that traveled the Renaissance Faire circuit. Beginning in 2000 and ending in 2004, they performed the show at Zachary Scott Theatre in Austin, Texas, replacing the renaissance-related theme of their show with a vaudeville theme. They used the vaudeville theme in their traveling show on Broadway as well.

The Flaming Idiots performed on Comic Strip Live, Sunday Comics, The Today Show, The Tonight Show and others, but Hunt says, "We always preferred to perform onstage with a live audience."

In 2009, they reunited for the holiday-themed production "Chestnuts Roasting on the Flaming Idiots" at the New Victory Theater in New York City, New York.

== Performance ==
Rob Williams introduced himself as "Gyro" and acted as emcee of the troupe as well as a performer. Kevin Hunt's stage character of "Walter" was taciturn and deadpan, while O'Connor's character of "Pyro" was a zany and unhinged character.

They performed a wide variety of tricks, but their act was based primarily on juggling and object manipulation and was heavily accented with comedy. Signature routines included the three men juggling five beanbag chairs, Williams' whip-cracking tricks, a sword-swallowing act from Hunt that was modified using a 4-foot-long (1.2 m) animal balloon, a triple escape from intertwined straitjackets, and a three-man acrobatic trick they called Chicken Fight. They also juggled flaming torches and knives and were expert at club passing. They used some audience participation in shows. Williams performed a routine involving making a bologna sandwich entirely with his feet and handing it to an audience member to eat. He performed this sketch on The Tonight Show, and for it he is in The Guinness Book of World Records. Williams holds the world record for this activity.

The act routinely received high praise from arts critics in numerous newspapers. They claim to have performed in five countries: "The United States, Canada, Mexico, England, and Texas."

When The Flaming Idiots disbanded the show, the mayor of Austin attended their last show at Zach Scott Theater and read a mayoral proclamation naming that day "Flaming Idiots Day" in Austin, TX.

The troupe published a DVD titled "The Flaming Idiots: Their Very, Very, Very, Very Last Show Ever!" The DVD was Directed by Steven Annenberg and distributed through Madam Mogul Productions. It was recorded live at the New Victory Theater in NYC during their "farewell" performance.

Since the act disbanded, Rob Williams has started a two-person variety comedy show called Kamikaze Fireflies (www.kamikazefireflies.com). Along with his partner Casey Martin they travel all over the world performing traditional skills such as juggling and hula hooping mixed with absurd moments such as a hot dog being chased by a dinosaur. You can find them at www.Facebook.com/kamikazefireflies. Before joining forces with Casey Martin, and immediately following the end of the Idiots, Rob continued to perform worldwide as a solo variety artist, television writer, stand up comic, and made theatrical forays, including the role of the elf in David Sedaris' The Santaland Diaries, performed in 2004 at Zachary Scott theater in Austin, Texas.

On July 20, 2024, Jon O'Connor died, leaving a hole in the hearts of many.

The Flaming Idiots have finished a reunion tour. Their first stop was The Moisture Festival in Seattle, next was the Edmonton Street Performers Festival, then it was back to Broadway at The New Victory, and then it finished with a run in Austin, TX at Zach Scott, and a one weekend appearance at the Scarborough Renaissance Festival in Waxahachie, TX.
