= Zach Theatre =

Theatre company in Austin, Texas, US

Coordinates: 30°15′50.4″N 97°45′32.4″W

Zach Theater
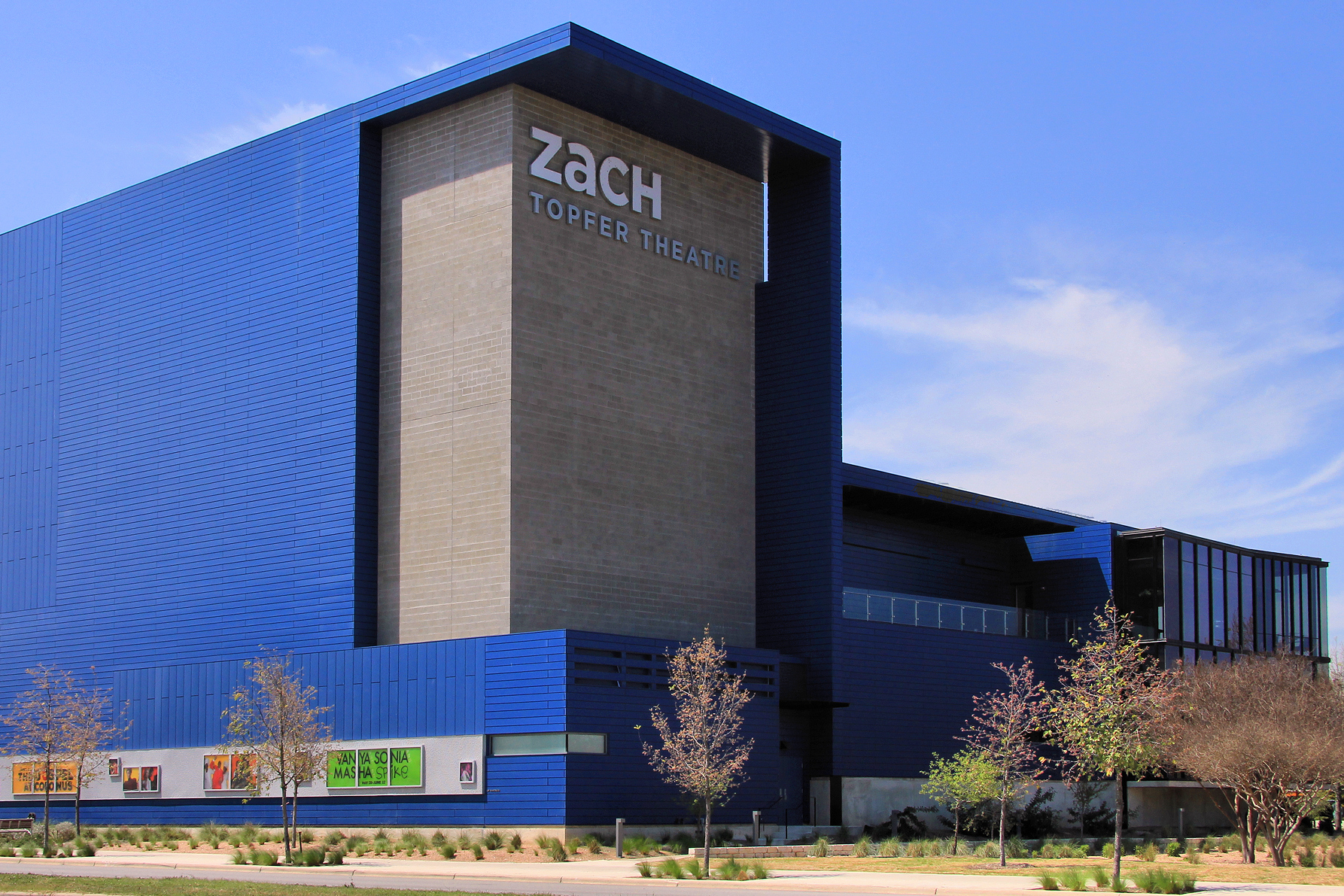
- Topfer Theatre Building
- Interactive map of Zach Theater
- Full name: Zachary Scott Theatre Center
- Former names: Austin Civic Theatre
- Location: 202 South Lamar Blvd; Austin, Texas 78704
- Public transit: CapMetro Rapid 803 at Barton Springs station

Construction
- Built: 2011
- Opened: January 1, 1932

Website
- zachtheatre.org

Zach Theater (the Zachary Scott Theatre Center) is a professional theatre company located in Austin, Texas, as well as its associated complex of theatre facilities. The company is the oldest continuously active theatre company in Texas, and one of the ten oldest in the country.

== Offerings and facilities ==
The theatre operates year-round, serving more than 100,000 patrons annually, with more than 500 performances including plays, musicals, original works, and theatre for youth. ZACH also provides education programs that are utilized by thousands of children throughout central Texas.

The theatre complex, located on the south shore of Lady Bird Lake, includes three stages, several event spaces, and numerous classrooms and offices. Some of the theatre's facilities are made available for private rental, including the three stages. Costumes and props are also available for rental.

== History ==
The theatre originally opened in 1932 as the Austin Little Theater. Sometime later, it became known as the "Austin Civic Theater". The company's name was changed to the Zachary Scott Theatre Center in 1968 to honor Austin native and film star Zachary Scott. Since then, it has been rebranded to be titled ZACH Theatre.

In 1972, the 230-seat Kleberg Theatre was built, and in 1990 a 135-seat theatre-in-the-round called the Whisenhunt Theatre was added. In 2006, the city of Austin passed a bond issue which included $10 million to fund a new theatre for ZACH, resulting in the construction of the 420-seat Topfer Theatre in 2011.

== Production history ==
A complete list of ZACH Theatre productions beginning in 1995 is shown below.

2023–2024 Season

- Beautiful: The Carol King Musical
- The Lehman Trilogy
- Prom
- Natasha, Pierre and the Great Comet of 1812
- The Thin Place
- George Gershwin Alone

2022–2023 Season

- A Christmas Carol
- Head Over Heels
- Noises Off
- Roe
- Cinderella

2021–2022 Season

- Into the Woods
- A Rockin Christmas Carol
- Cat in the Hat (Theatre for Families)
- The Elaborate Entrance of Chad Deity
- Somebody Loves You, Mr. Hatch (Theatre for Families)
- Rocky Horror Picture Show
- The Sound of Music
- The Inheritance Part 1

2020–2021 Season

- Songs Under the Stars: A Socially-distanced Outdoor Concert Series
  - Disney Through the Decades
  - Rockabilly Kings
  - 70s Female Rockstars
  - Tameca Jones in Concert
  - Beatles Redux
  - Gospel Down by the Riverside
  - 80's Dance Party

2019–2020 Season

- A Night with Janis Joplin
- Every Brilliant Thing
- Somebody Loves You, Mr. Hatch (Theatre for Families)
- Songs Under the Stars: A Socially-distanced Outdoor Concert Series
  - On Broadway
  - 70s Female Rockstars
  - Motown Grooves
  - Superstar CHANEL
  - A Rockin' Holiday Concert

2018–2019 Season

- Once
- A Rockin Christmas Carol
- The Santaland Diaries
- Hedwig and the Angry Inch
- Notes from the Field
- Matilda The Musical
- The Ballad of Klook and Vinette*
- Fire and Air
- Tortoise & the Hare (Theatre for Families)
- Holiday Heroes (TFF)
- Wake Up, Brother Bear (TFF)

2017–2018 Season

- Singin' in the Rain
- A Tuna Christmas
- A Rockin Christmas Carol
- The Curious Incident of the Dog in the Night-Time
- Sunday in the Park with George
- Heisenberg
- Disney's Beauty and the Beast
- The Lion, the Witch, and the Wardrobe (Theatre for Families)
- Holiday Heroes (TFF)
- Las Aventuras de Enoughie (TFF)
- Goodnight Moon (TFF)

2016–2017 Season

- Priscilla, Queen of the Desert
- A Rockin Christmas Carol
- The Santaland Diaries
- The Great Society
- Lady Day at Emerson's Bar and Grill
- In the Heights
- Million Dollar Quartet
- Elephant and Piggie: We are in a Play! (Theatre For Families)
- Charlotte's Web (TFF)
- jj's arcade (TFF)

2015– 2016 Season

- Evita
- A Rockin Christmas Carol
- The Santaland Diaries
- Tribes
- ANN
- One Man, Two Guvnors
- Buyer & Cellar
- Mary Poppins
- James in the Giant Peach (Theatre For Families)
- Winnie the Pooh (TFF)
- Alice in Wonderland (TFF)
- Tomas and the Library Lady (TFF)

2014–2015 Season

- The King and I
- A Rockin Christmas Carol
- This Wonderful Life
- Peter and the Starcatcher
- All the Way
- Mothers and Sons
- Sophisticated Ladies
- Maid Marian in a Stolen Car*

2013–2014 Season

- Les Miserables by Claude-Michel Schonberg, Herbert Kretzmer Topfer Theatre
- A Christmas Story by Joseph Robinette, Benj Pasek, Justin Paul Topfer Theatre
- This Wonderful Life by Steve Murray Whisenhunt Stage
- In the Next Room or the vibrator play by Sarah Ruhl Topfer Theatre
- The Gospel at Colonus by Lee Breuer, Bob Telson Topfer Theatre
- Vanya and Sonia and Masha and Spike by Christopher Durang Topfer Theatre
- Maid Marian in a Stolen Car by Jaston Williams Whisenhunt Stage
- The Who's Tommy by Pete Townshend, Des McAnuff Topfer Theatre

2012—2013 Season

- Harvey by Mary Chase 05/23/13—06/16/13 Karen Kuykendall Stage
- Mad Beat Hip & Gone by Steven Dietz 04/11/13—04/28/13 Karen Kuykendall Stage
- 33 Variations by Moisés Kaufman 01/31/13—02/17/13 Karen Kuykendall Stage
- Tru by Jay Presson Allen 01/17/13—03/10/13 Whisenhunt Stage
- White Christmas by Paul Blake, David Ives & Irving Berlin 12/13/12—12/30/12 Karen Kuykendall Stage
- The Santaland Diaries by David Sedaris, adapted by Joe Mantello 11/24/12—12/23/12 Whisenhunt Stage
- Ragtime by Terrence McNally, Lynn Ahrens & Stephen Flaherty, adapted from the novel by E. L. Doctorow 10/25/12—11/18/12 Karen Kuykendall Stage
- Xanadu by Douglas Carter Beane, John Farrar & Jeff Lynne, adapted from the Universal Pictures film 09/01/12—11/11/12 Kleberg Stage
- Fully Committed by Becky Mode 09/01/12—09/30/12 Whisenhunt Stage
Production history 1995—2012

2011–2012 Season

- Xanadu by Douglas Carter Beane 07/21/12—09/02/12 Kleberg Stage
- Fully Committed by Becky Mode 06/16/12—09/30/12 Whisenhunt Stage
- Dividing the Estate by Horton Foote 06/02/12—07/01/12 Kleberg Stage
- The Laramie Project by Moisés Kaufman, Stephen Belber, Leigh Fondakowski, Andy Paris & Greg Pierotti 03/24/12—05/13/12 Kleberg Stage
- The Laramie Project – Ten Years Later by Stephen Belber, Leigh Fondakowski, Moises Kaufman, Andy Paris & Greg Pierotti 03/24/12—05/13/12 Kleberg Stage
- Next to Normal by Brian Yorkey & Tom Kitt 01/28/12—03/04/12 Kleberg Stage
- God of Carnage by Yasmina Reza, translation by Christopher Hampton 12/03/11—01/08/12 Kleberg Stage
- The Santaland Diaries by David Sedaris, adapted by Joe Mantello 11/26/11—01/08/12 Whisenhunt Stage
- Spring Awakening by Frank Wedekind, Steven Slater & Duncan Sheik 09/25/11—11/13/11 Kleberg Stage

2010–2011 Season

- Red Hot Patriot: The Kick-Ass Wit of Molly Ivins by Allison Engel & Margaret Engel 08/06/11—11/13/11 Whisenhunt Stage
- Hairspray by Mark O'Donnell, Thomas Meehan, Scott Whittman & Marc Shaiman, adapted from the 1988 John Waters film 06/25/11—08/28/11 Kleberg Stage
- The Book of Grace by Suzan-Lori Parks 06/04/11—07/24/11 Whisenhunt Stage
- August: Osage County by Tracy Letts 04/02/11—05/22/11 Kleberg Stage
- Fiction by Steven Dietz 02/12/11—04/10/11 Whisenhunt Stage
- Red Hot Patriot: The Kick Ass Wit of Molly Ivins by Margaret and Allison Engel 01/29/11—03/13/11 Whisenhunt Stage
- Rockin' Christmas Party by Dave Steakley 12/11/10—12/26/10 Kleberg Stage
- The Santaland Diaries by David Sedaris, adapted by Joe Mantello 11/27/10—01/02/11 Whisenhunt Stage
- Rent by Jonathan Larson 09/11/10—11/28/10 Kleberg Stage

2009–2010 Season

- Metamorphoses by Mary Zimmerman 08/07/10—09/12/10 Whisenhunt Stage
- The Drowsy Chaperone by Bob Martin, Don McKellar, Greg Morrison & Lisa Lambert 06/26/10—08/01/10 Kleberg Stage
- Becky's New Car by Steven Dietz 06/05/10—07/11/10 Whisenhunt Stage
- Our Town by Thornton Wilder 04/17/10—05/23/10 Kleberg Stage
- The Flaming Idiots by Kevin Hunt, Jon O'Connor & Rob Williams 01/30/10—03/07/10 Kleberg Stage
- Rockin' Christmas Party by Dave Steakley 11/29/09—12/27/09 Kleberg Stage
- The Santaland Diaries by David Sedaris, adapted by Joe Mantello 11/29/09—01/10/10 Whisenhunt Stage
- The 25th Annual Putnam County Spelling Bee by Rachael Sheinkin & William Finn 09/19/09—10/25/09 Kleberg Stage

2008–2009 Season

- Love, Janis by Randal Myler, adapted from Love, Janis by Laura Joplin 05/28/09—08/30/09 Kleberg Stage
- The Grapes of Wrath by Frank Galati, adapted from the novel by John Steinbeck 03/12/09—05/10/09 Kleberg Stage
- Shooting Star by Steven Dietz 02/12/09—04/05/09 Whisenhunt Stage
- Let Me Down Easy by Anna Deavere Smith 01/22/09—02/15/09 Kleberg Stage
- Rockin' Christmas Party by Dave Steakley 11/28/08—01/04/09 Kleberg Stage
- The Santaland Diaries by David Sedaris, adapted by Joe Mantello 11/28/08—01/11/09 Whisenhunt Stage
- Caroline, or Change by Jeanine Tesori, adapted from Caroline, or Change by Tony Kushner 09/18/08—11/09/08 Kleberg Stage

2007–2008 Season

- The Clean House by Sarah Ruhl 07/10/08—08/31/08 Whisenhunt Stage
- Seussical The Musical by Lynn Ahrens & Stephen Flaherty, adapted from the works of Dr. Seuss, 06/27/08—08/10/08 co-production with ZACH's Performing Arts School
- Altar Boyz by Kevin Del Aguila, Gary Adler & Michael Patrick Walker 06/05/08—08/30/08 Kleberg Stage
- Doubt by John Patrick Shanley 04/03/08—05/25/08 Whisenhunt Stage
- Speeding Motorcycle by Jason Nodler, adapted by Daniel Johnston & Jason Nodler 02/14/08—04/13/08 Kleberg Stage
- Porgy and Bess by Ira Gershwin, George Gershwin & Dubose Heyward 01/25/08—02/03/08 Austin Music Hall
- Plaid Tidings by Stuart Ross 11/29/07—12/30/07 Groten Stage
- The Santaland Diaries by David Sedaris, adapted by Joe Mantello 11/22/07—01/06/07 Whisenhunt Stage
- Rockin' Christmas Party by Dave Steakley 11/22/07—12/30/07 Kleberg Stage

2006–2007 Season

- Disney's High School Musical by Peter Barsocchini 07/20/07—08/12/07 co-production with ZACH's Performing Arts School
- An Almost Holy Picture by Heather McDonald 07/19/07—08/26/07 Groten Stage
- Jesus Christ Superstar, Jesucristo Superestrella by Tim Rice & Andrew Lloyd Webber 05/24/07—08/12/07 Whisenhunt Stage
- Take Me Out by Richard Greenberg 03/29/07—05/06/07 Whisenhunt Stage
- Present Laughter by Noël Coward 01/18/07—03/11/07 Whisenhunt Stage
- The Santaland Diaries by David Sedaris, adapted by Joe Mantello 11/24/06—01/07/07 Groten Stage
- Rockin' Christmas Party by Dave Steakley 11/24/06—01/07/07 Whisenhunt Stage
- Plaid Tidings by Stuart Ross 11/02/06—12/31/06 Kleberg Stage
- The Rocky Horror Show by Richard O'Brian 10/05/06—11/12/06 Whisenhunt Stage

2005–2006 Season

- Bad Dates by Theresa Rebeck 07/13/06—08/27/06 Whisenhunt Stage
- I Am My Own Wife by Doug Wright 05/25/06—07/20/06 Kleberg Stage
- The Exonerated by Jessica Blank & Erik Jensen 03/30/06—05/07/06 Kleberg Stage
- Urinetown by Greg Kotis & Mark Hollmann 01/19/06—03/12/06 Kleberg Stage
- Rockin' Christmas Party by Dave Steakley 12/01/05—01/01/06 Kleberg Stage
- The Santaland Diaries by David Sedaris, adapted by Joe Mantello 11/25/05—01/08/06 Groten Stage
- Keepin' it Weird by Dave Steakley 10/01/05—11/13/05 Kleberg Stage
- Shear Madness by Paul Portner, adapted by Marilyn Abrams & Bruce Jordan 08/20/05—09/25/05 Whisenhunt Stage

2004–2005 Season

- Keepin' It Weird by Dave Steakley 07/07/05—08/28/05 Kleberg Stage
- Hank Williams: Lost Highway by Mark Harelik & Randal Myler 04/21/05—06/19/05 Kleberg Stage
- Z Cabarets 03/26/05—06/05/05 Whisenhunt Stage
- The Vagina Monologues by Eve Ensler 03/24/05—05/08/05 Whisenhunt Stage
- Aida by Elton John & Tim Rice 01/27/05—04/03/05 Kleberg Stage
- Blown Sideways Through Life by Claudia Shear 01/13/05—03/06/05 Whisenhunt Stage
- The Santaland Diaries by David Sedaris, adapted by Joe Mantello 11/26/04—01/02/05
- Crowns by Regina Taylor, adapted from Crowns: Portraits of Black Women in Church Hats by Michael Cunningham and Craig Marberry 09/30/04—11/14/04 Kleberg Stage
- Omnium Gatherum by Alexandra Gerston-Vassilaros & Theresa Rebeck 09/16/04—10/24/04 Whisenhunt Stage

2003–2004 Season

- House Arrest by Anna Deavere Smith 08/05/04—09/12/04 Kleberg Stage
- Cabaret by Joe Masteroff, Fred Ebb & John Kander 05/29/04—07/18/04 Kleberg Stage
- Antigone: Looking into the Sun by Ann Ciccolella 04/18/04—05/05/04 Kleberg Stage
- It Ain't Nothin' But the Blues by Charles Bevel, Lita Gaithers, Randal Myler, Ron Taylor & Dan Wheetman, music by Allen Robertson 01/22/04—02/29/04 Kleberg Stage
- Always...Patsy Cline by Ted Swindly, music by Allen Robertson 01/15/04—07/25/04 Whisenhunt Stage
- Rockin' Christmas Party by Dave Steakley 12/10/03—12/21/03 The Paramount Theatre
- The Santaland Diaries by David Sedaris, adapted by Joe Mantello 11/28/03—01/04/03 ' Whisenhunt Stage
- The Flaming Idiots by Kevin Hunt, Jon O'Connor & Rob Williams 11/15/03—01/04/04 Kleberg Stage
- Who's Afraid of Virginia Woolf? by Edward Albee 09/25/03—11/09/03 Whisenhunt Stage

2002–2003 Season

- Beehive by Larry Gallagher 07/10/03—10/26/03 Kleberg Stage
- Fully Committed by Becky Mode 06/05/03—07/27/03 Whisenhunt Stage
- Side Man by Warren Leight 05/17/03—06/22/03 Kleberg Stage
- Love! Valour! Compassion! by Terrence McNally 03/20/03—04/27/03 Kleberg Stage
- Limonade Tours de Jours by Charles L. Mee, music by Allen Robertson 01/23/03—03/02/03 Kleberg Stage
- Rockin' Christmas Party by Dave Steakley 12/11/02—12/22/02 The Paramount Theatre
- The Santaland Diaries by David Sedaris, adapted by Joe Mantello 11/29/02—01/05/03 Whisenhunt Stage
- Smokey Joe's Café Jerry Leiber and Mike Stoller 10/17/02—01/05/03 Kleberg Stage
- Dirty Blonde by Claudia Shear, based on a concept by Claudia Shear and James Lapine 09/19/02—11/10/02 Whisenhunt Stage

2001–2002 Season

- Bee-Luther-Hatchee by Thomas Gibbons 07/25/02—09/01/02 Whisenhunt Stage
- Hair by Galt MacDermot, James Rado & Gerome Ragni, music by Allen Robertson 07/11/02—09/29/02 Kleberg Stage
- The Flaming Idiots by Kevin Hunt, Jon O'Connor & Rob Williams, music by Allen Robertson 05/02/02—06/23/02 Kleberg Stage
- The Laramie Project by Moisés Kaufman, music by Allen Robertson 02/21/02—04/07/02 Kleberg Stage
- Hedwig and the Angry Inch by John Cameron Mitchell 01/24/02—03/17/02 Whisenhunt Stage
- Slut for Art by Ping Chong & Muna Tseng 01/17/02—01/27/02 Kleberg Stage –
- Rockin' Christmas Party by Dave Steakley & Michael Raiford 12/19/01—12/29/01 The Paramount Theatre
- Lypsinka! The Boxed Set by John Epperson 11/30/01—12/31/01 Whisenhunt Stage
- The Santaland Diaries by David Sedaris, adapted by Joe Mantello 11/29/01—01/05/01 Whisenhunt Stage
- Misery by Simon Moore & Stephen King, adapted from the novel by Stephen King 10/18/01—11/25/01 Whisenhunt Stage
- Little Shop of Horrors by Howard Ashman, adapted by Charles Griffith 09/20/01—11/04/02 Kleberg Stage

2000–2001 Season

- And the World Goes 'Round by Scott Ellis, Susan Stroman, David Thompson, Fred Ebb & John Kander 07/26/01—08/19/01 Whisenhunt Stage
- Jelly's Last Jam by George C. Wolfe & Jelly Roll Morton, adapted by Luther Henderson 06/28/01—08/19/01 Kleberg Stage
- .Com by Acia Gray 05/31/01—06/10/01 Kleberg Stage
- Master Class by Terrence McNally 05/24/01—07/08/01 Whisenhunt Stage
- Circumference of a Squirrel by John Walch 04/12/01—05/06/01
- Jouét by Allen Robertson 04/05/01—05/13/01 Kleberg Stage
- A Streetcar Named Desire by Tennessee Williams 02/01/01—03/11/01 Kleberg Stage
- 'Art' by Yasmina Reza 01/18/01—02/18/01 Whisenhunt Stage
- Rockin' Christmas Party by Dave Steakley 12/13/00—12/24/00 The Paramount Theatre
- The Santaland Diaries by David Sedaris, adapted by Joe Mantello 11/24/00—01/07/01 Whisenhunt Stage
- The Flaming Idiots, Kevin Hunt, Jon O'Connor 11/24/00—01/13/01 Kleberg Stage
- Evita by Tim Rice & Andrew Lloyd Webber 09/14/00—11/12/00 Kleberg Stage
- Tru by Jay Presson Allen 09/07/00—10/29/00 Whisenhunt Stage
- 1999–2000 Season
- Closer by Patrick Marber 07/20/00—08/13/00 Whisenhunt Stage
- Tapestry: The Music of Carole King, adapted by Rowan Joseph, John Kroner & Jeffrey Martin 06/22/00—08/13/00 Kleberg Stage
- Abundance by Beth Henley 06/09/00—07/02/00 Whisenhunt Stage
- Pride's Crossing by Tina Howe 04/27/00—06/04/00 Kleberg Stage
- Bucky: The Life and Work of Buckminster Fuller by Alice Wilson 03/31/00—04/22/00 Whisenhunt Stage
- The America Play by Suzan-Lori Parks 02/10/00—03/19/00 Whisenhunt Stage
- Rockin' Christmas Party by Dave Steakley, music by Allen Robertson 12/16/99—12/30/99 The Paramount Theatre
- The Flaming Idiots, Kevin Hunt, Jon O'Connor & Rob Williams, music by Allen Robertson 12/08/99—01/16/00 Kleberg Stage
- The Santaland Diaries by David Sedaris, adapted by Joe Mantello 11/19/99—01/09/00 Whisenhunt Stage
- The Rocky Horror Show by Richard O'Brien, music by Allen Robertson 09/30/99—11/07/99 Kleberg Stage
- Shakespeare's R&J by Joe Calarco, adapted from Romeo and Juliet by William Shakespeare 09/16/99—10/10/99 Whisenhunt Stage

1998–1999 Season

- The Mystery of Irma Vep by Charles Ludlam, music by Allen Robertson 07/22/99—09/01/99 Kleberg Stage
- My Children, My Africa by Athol Fugard 06/03/99—06/27/99 Whisenhunt Stage
- Beehive by Larry Gallagher, music by Allen Robertson 04/29/99—06/07/99 Kleberg Stage
- Full Gallop by Mark Hampton & Mary Louise Wilson 03/03/99—04/11/99 Whisenhunt Stage
- Ain't Misbehavin', based on the music of Fats Waller 02/04/99—03/28/99 Kleberg Stage
- Rockin' Christmas Party by Dave Steakley, music by Allen Robertson 12/10/98—12/20/98 The Paramount Theatre
- The Last Night of Ballyhoo by Alfred Uhry 11/01/98—12/15/98 Kleberg Stage
- Angels in America part 1: Millennium Approaches by Tony Kushner, music by Allen Robertson 10/22/98—11/22/98 Kleberg Stage
- Angels in America part 2: Perestroika by Tony Kushner, music by Allen Robertson 09/17/98—11/22/98 Kleberg Stage
- School House Rock by George Newall & Tom Yohe, adapted by Theatre Bam 09/05/98—10/22/98 Whisenhunt Stage

1997–1998 Season

- The Who's Tommy by Des McAnuff & Pete Townshend, additional music by Allen Robertson 06/20/98—07/28/98 Kleberg Stage
- Angels in America part 1: Millennium Approaches by Tony Kushner, music by Allen Robertson 04/11/98—05/11/98 Kleberg Stage
- Rockin' Christmas Party by Dave Steakley 12/10/97—12/24/97 The Paramount Theatre
- The Taffetas by Rick Lewis 11/08/97—12/31/97 Whisenhunt Stage
- The Piano Lesson by August Wilson 09/20/97—10/26/97 Kleberg Stage

1996–1997 Season

- Dreamgirls by Tom Eyen & Henry Krieger 08/01/97—08/17/97 The Paramount Theatre
- Love, Janis by Randal Myler, adapted from Love, Janis by Laura Joplin 06/13/97—07/22/97 Kleberg Stage
- Jack and Jill by Jane Martin 04/26/97—06/06/97 Kleberg Stage
- Ruthless! The Musical by Joel Paley & Marvin Laird 01/18/97—02/23/97 Kleberg Stage
- Rockin' Christmas Party by Dave Steakley 12/13/96—12/29/96 The Paramount Theatre
- A Christmas Carol by Adrian Hall & Richard Cumming, adapted from the novel by Charles Dickens 11/29/96—12/22/96 Kleberg Stage
- The Gospel at Colonus by Lee Breur & Bob Telson 10/05/96—11/10/96 Kleberg Stage
- Sylvia by A. R. Gurney 09/14/96—11/30/96 Whisenhunt Stage

1995–1996 Season

- All I Really Need to Know I Learned in Kindergarten by Ernest Zulia & David Caldwell 06/01/96—07/08/96 Kleberg Stage
- Das Barbecu by Jim Luigs & Scott Warrender 05/18/96—06/23/96 Kleberg Stage
- Born Yesterday by Garson Kanin 04/06/96—05/12/96 Kleberg Stage
- Soul Sisters by Dave Steakley, music by Allen Robertson 02/03/96—04/14/96 Kleberg Stage
- Rockin' Christmas Party by Dave Steakley 12/11/95—12/22/95 The Paramount Theatre
- Shear Madness by Marilyn Abrams & Bruce Jordan 10/06/95—01/28/96 Whisenhunt Stage
- Avenue X by John Jiler, Christina J. Moore & Ray Leslee 09/23/95—10/29/95 Kleberg Stage

== Awards ==
In 2012, ZACH got a $70,000 grant from the National Endowment for the Arts to produce the Terrence McNally musical Ragtime.

Each year The Austin Chronicle presents its 'Best of Austin' awards. Awards given to ZACH beginning in 1993 are shown below.

Best of Austin awards
- 2011: Readers Best Theatre Director
- 2010: Readers Best Actor/Actress
- 2007: Readers Best Theatre Performance Space
- 2006: Readers Theatre Performance Space
- 2006: Readers Theatre Director
- 2005: Critics Most Entertaining Nonprofit
- 2004: Readers Best Live Theatre
- 2000: Critics Place For Class Clowns
- 1999: Readers Theatre Company
- 1998: Readers Theatre Company
- 1997: Readers Theatre Company
- 1996: Readers Theatre Space
- 1996: Critics Razzle Dazzle
- 1996: Critics Kids Acting Program
- 1995: Readers Theatre Space
- 1994: Readers Theatre Space
- 1993: Readers Theatre Space
