= Corner Theatre ETC =

Experimental theater in Baltimore, Maryland

Coordinates: 39°18′2.6″N 76°37′12″W

- Interactive map of Corner Theatre ETC
- Address: 891 North Howard Street; Baltimore, Maryland; United States
- Capacity: 100
- Type: Experimental Theatre Club
- Current use: Antique Store

Construction
- Opened: 1968
- Years active: 1968–1987

Corner Theatre E.T.C. (Corner Theatre) was an experimental theater located in Baltimore, Maryland, existing from 1968 to 1987 as a nonprofit cultural organization.

The theater provided resources for new playwrights, designers, directors, actors, dancers, and other artists seeking experimental avenues for self-expression and social and political commentary. Throughout its nineteen-year existence, Corner Theatre was dedicated to presenting new and original plays, while encouraging a confrontational approach to production.

== The first year: 1968 ==
The Corner Theatre Experimental Theatre Club (Corner Theatre E.T.C.) was created following a Monday night lecture given by New York City's La MaMa Experimental Theatre Club founder and artistic director Ellen Stewart at Center Stage, an Equity theatre in Baltimore.

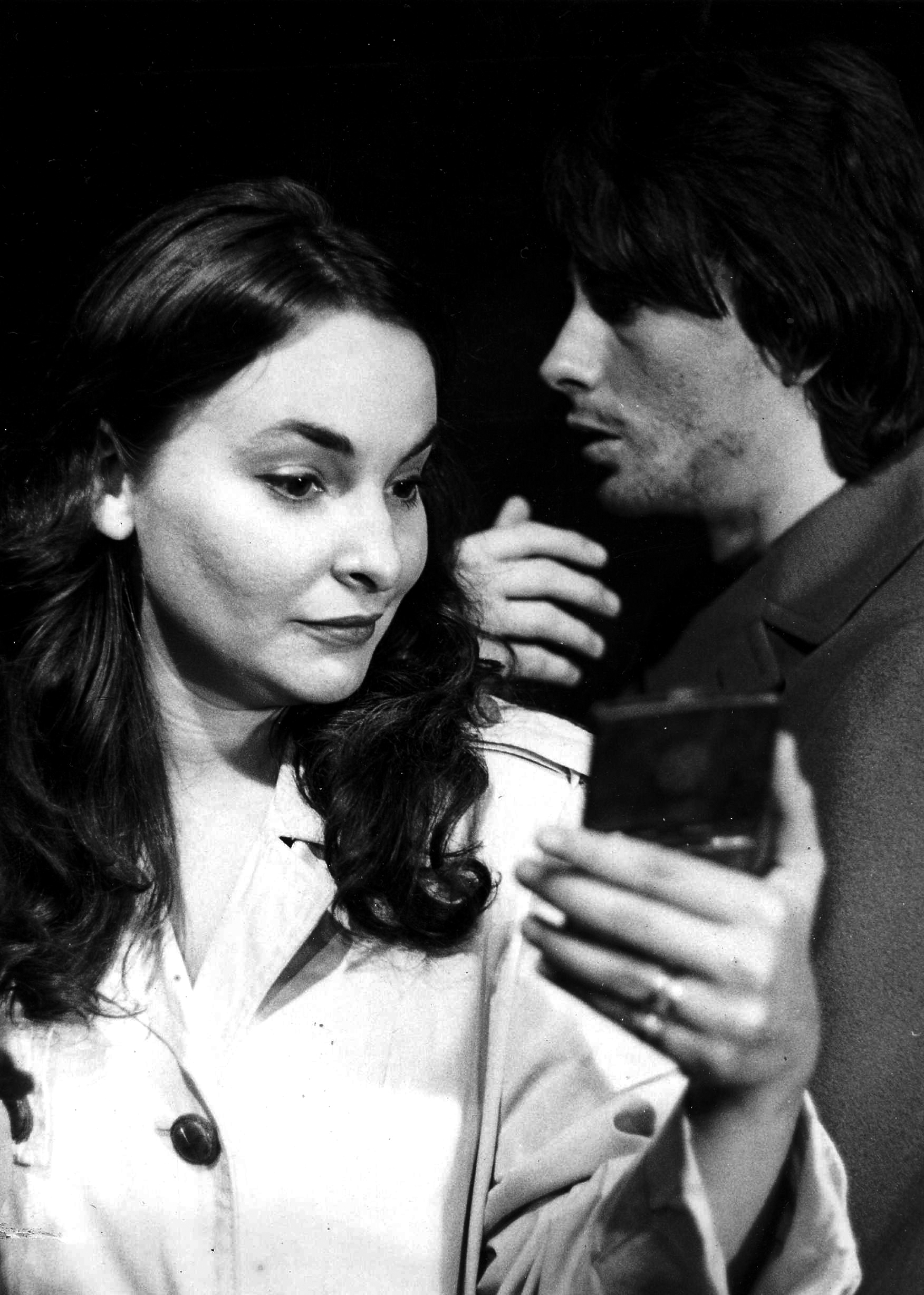
Judith Thornton (left) with Stanley Keyes in a production at the Corner Theatre ETC, 1971.

Stewart's lecture challenged those in attendance to create a Baltimore version of her East Village-based experimental theatre. Local producer and director Leslie Irons subsequently met with Stewart and was granted La MaMa's repertoire of original plays. Irons then assembled a group of artists who shared his interest in the creation of a new, radical performing arts center, including: Cliff Pottberg, Mac Lang, Marie Stewart, Daniel Inglett, and Joe Harris. Funds were quickly raised, and Corner Theatre ETC opened at 853 North Howard Street with their inaugural production, an evening of two one-act plays: Birdbath by New York playwright Leonard Melfi and Baltimore playwright C. Richard Gillespie's The Burial. For the duration of the theatre's existence, Corner Theatre had a threefold mission:

1. Producing original, otherwise unseen plays;
2. Providing local theatre artists with a laboratory environment in which to experiment with unconventional theatrical techniques;
3. Occasionally abandoning the idea of presentational theatre altogether in exchange for happenings; at one such event, Changes, audiences were led one at a time through a twenty-minute sojourn into the blacklight world of super-sensory awareness, a late 1960s hall of mirrors and confrontation.

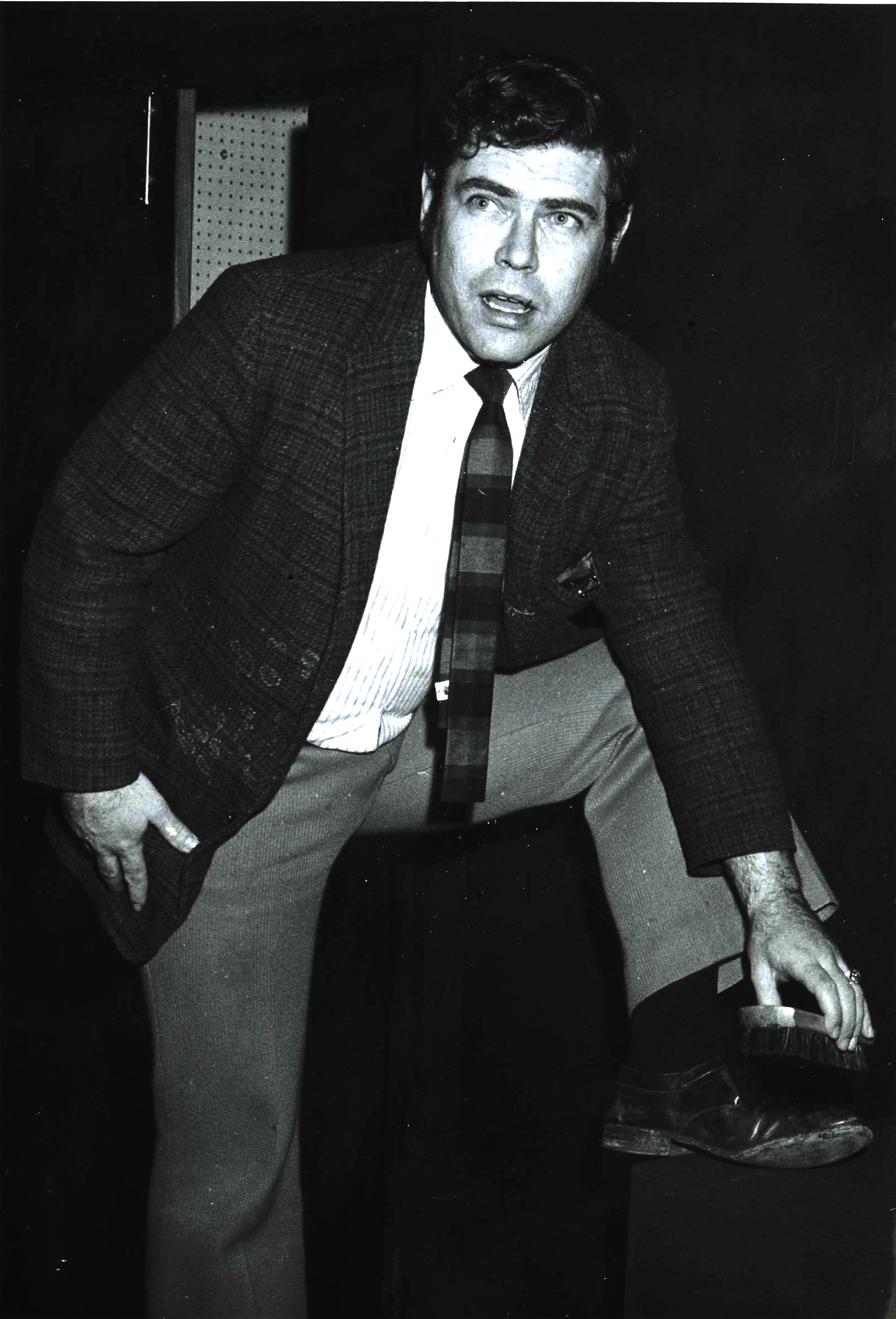
Actor Mort Lubitz onstage at Corner Theatre ETC in 1971.

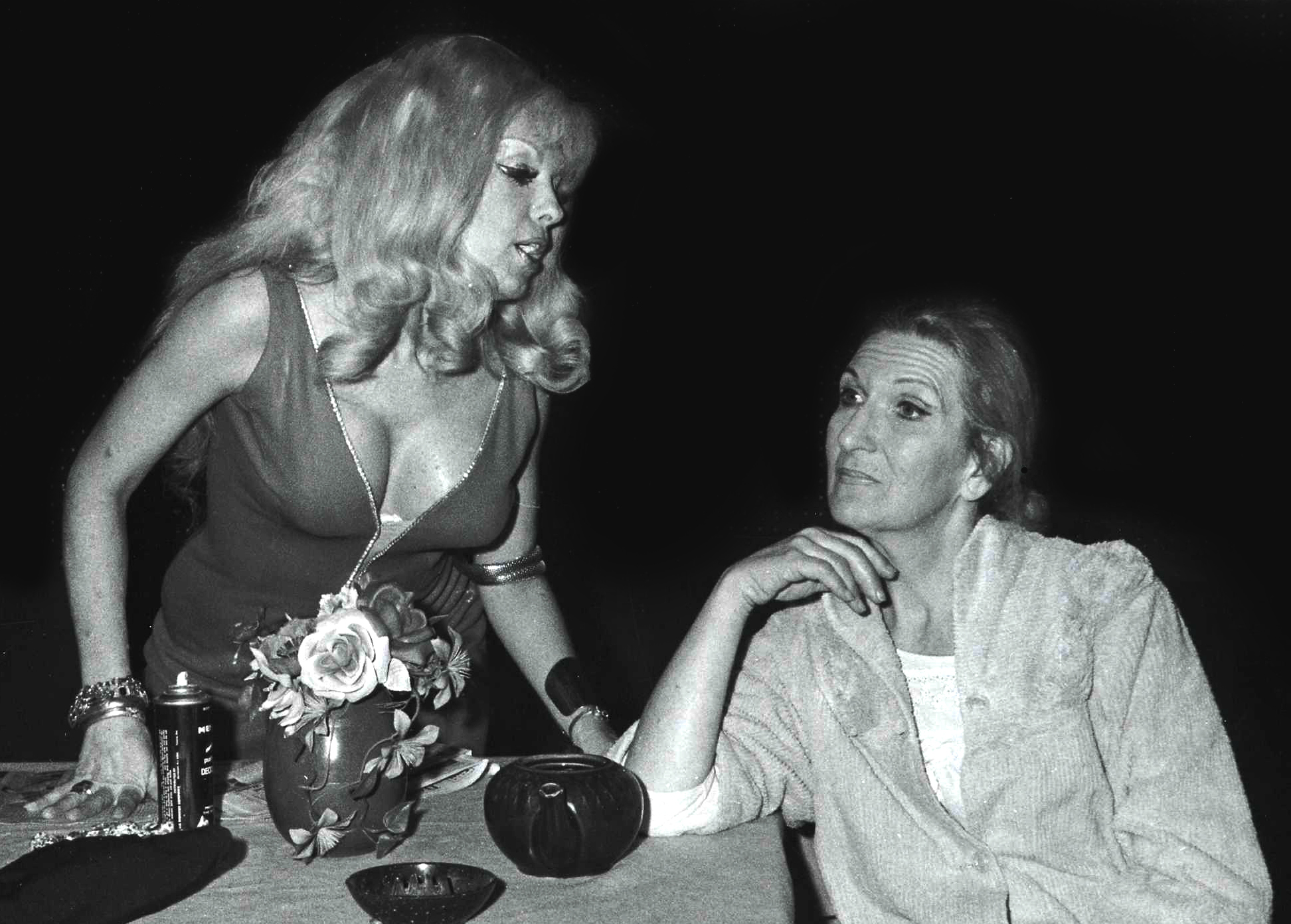
Actress Sandy MacDonald (left) onstage (with unknown actress) at Corner Theatre ETC, in 1971.

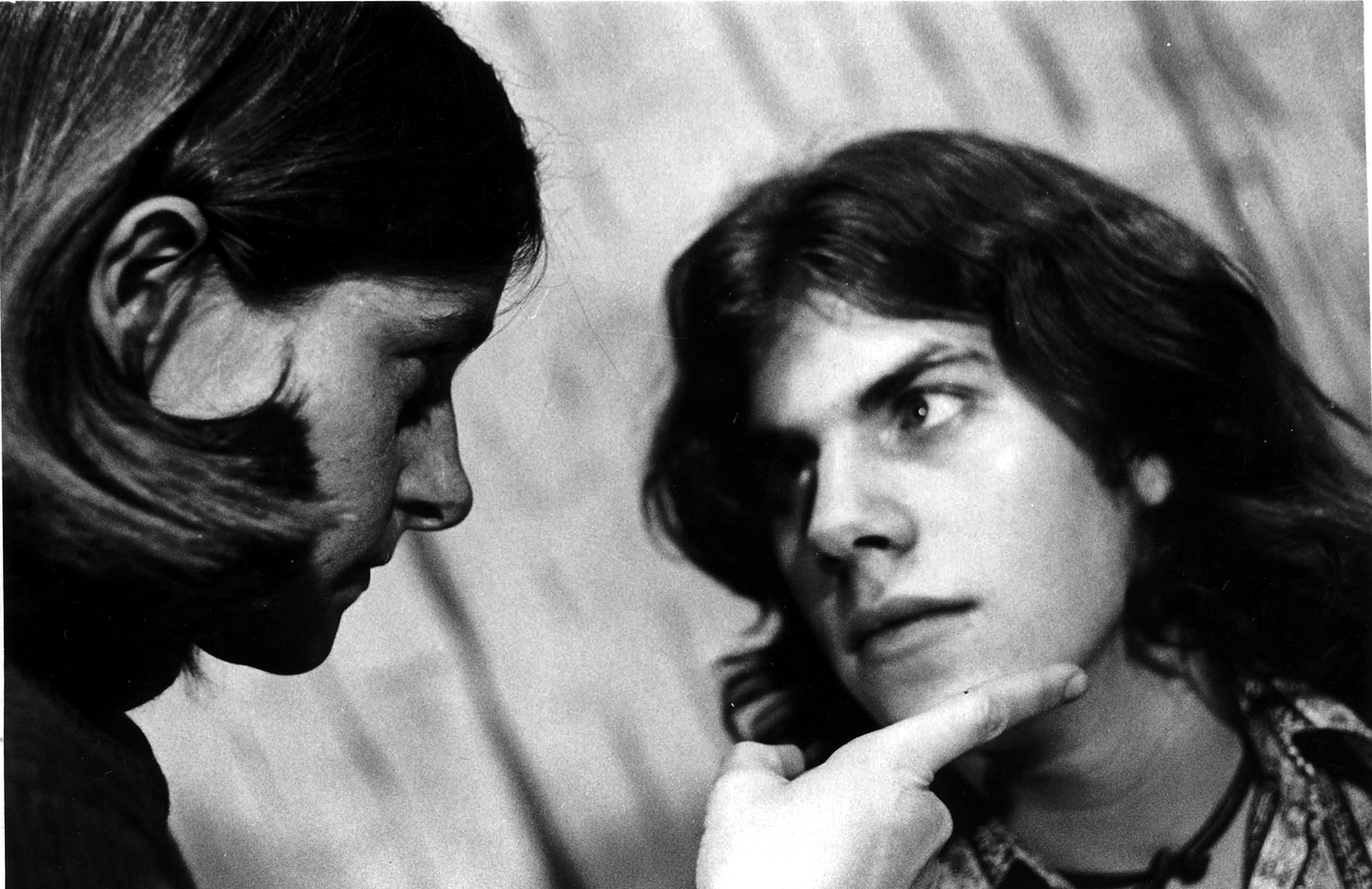
Brigitte Bentele with Brad Mays in a scene from Wolves, written by Gordon Porterfield and directed by C. Richard Gillespie at the Corner Theatre ETC in April 1973.

To avoid legal problems which might arise due to the nudity and profanity in many productions, Corner Theatre's charter listed the organization as a club rather than a theatre company.

Encouraged by the high level of interest, both public and press, in the theatre, Corner Theatre presented two new works by an energetic, imaginative local actor, playwright, and teacher, Gordon Porterfield. Porterfield's Authors and The Earth Is Dead were presented as an evening of one-acts under the title Ratsfeet. This initiated a relationship between the playwright and theatre that yielded, over the subsequent seven years, a series of increasingly rich and occasionally profane evenings of locally produced and written theatre.

== Subsequent history (1969–1987) and merge with Fells Point Theatre ==
By the end of 1968, Irons had moved away from Baltimore and Corner Theatre. Baltimore theatre artist Larry Lewman, along with several friends, including Charles Vanderpool, Louis Mills, and Richard Marie, took over the physical operations of Corner Theatre in late 1969 and brought a new level of professionalism to the theatre. Lewman gave an experienced local director, John Bruce Johnson, the role of artistic director. Within months, a newly remodeled Corner Theatre announced Porterfield's new full-length play Universal Nigger, a multi-media presentation depicting an African-American Christ's movements through the stations of the cross. This controversial and highly confrontational show, which attracted the largest audiences the theatre had seen, provided a production model for Corner Theatre for the years to follow. In an article published in The Paper, Bruce Johnson called the production "a sensation," noting that audience demand for the show was so great that even after another production had moved into the theatre's Thursday – Sunday performance slot, Universal Nigger continued playing on Wednesday evenings for two additional months. Later that year, Brooklyn's Chelsea Theater Center acquired the rights to Universal Nigger and produced it in their space for New York audiences, under the direction of Robert Kalfin.

In June 1970, Lewman resigned as managing director and the company moved its operations to 891 North Howard Street, with the premiere of Wallace Hamilton's Tegaroon. Bruce Johnson continued as artistic director and Richard Flax became the new managing director. Megan Terry's political rock musical Viet Rock, under the direction of Michael Makarovich, played to SRO audiences following its inaugural production by the Open Theatre, as performed at La MaMa in New York in 1966. The following year, HERE, an adaptation of Flax's Change, began a successful run. In October 1972, Corner Theatre acquired the rights to London playwright Charles Marowitz's An Othello for its American premiere.

During the Johnson-Flax period, Corner Theatre presented work by talented playwrights, actors, and directors eager to contribute to the new and challenging works being produced at the theatre, including New York playwright Kit Jones' Watchpit, directed by Makarovich. Makarovich also staged two Porterfield one-acts: The Catcher Was A Fag and I And Silence Some Strange Race, as well as an original teleplay called Tigers, among many others. Another work by Porterfield, whatisoneholycatholicapostalicbrownandstinksuptheuniverse, was directed by Bruce Johnson, as was Porterfield's subsequent evening of thirteen short one-acts, Gnomes. In January 1972, future Sundance award-winning filmmaker Steve Yeager had his directorial debut with the premiere of Lee Dorsey's Pigeons. In April 1973, Bruce Johnson suffered from a heart attack and was unable to finish directing Porterfield's latest evening of one-acts, Wolves. Director and playwright C. Richard Gillespie took over the production, which received excellent reviews. Hugh M. Jones' Inconnue was a didactic theatrical adaptation of Artaud's The Theatre and its Double, featuring a performance by Judy Rowe and an original musical score by Baltimore composer Chuck Wagner.

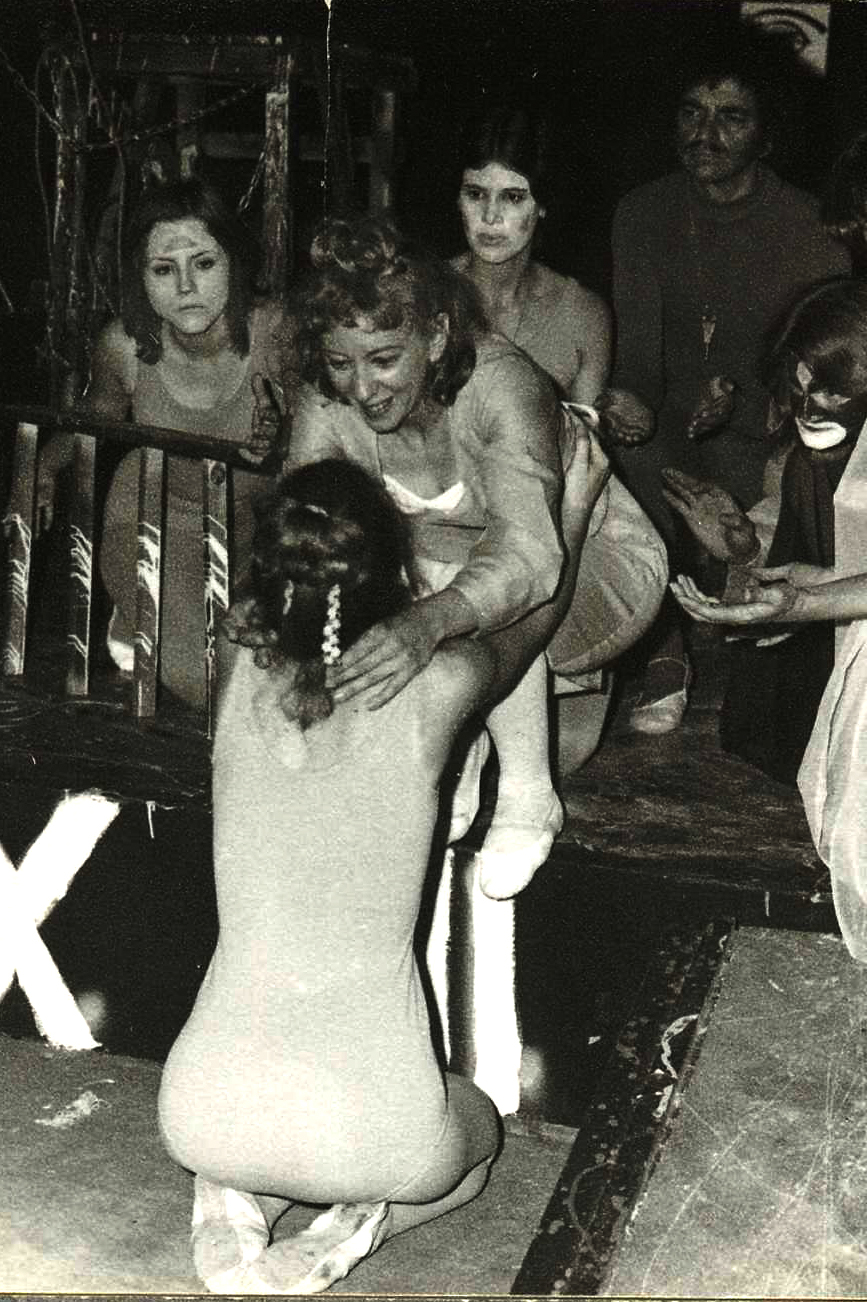
Judy Rowe, Johnada Elliot, Patty Reed, Arthur Seidman, Giovanni Pescetto and C. Beth Trott (facing away) in a scene from Inconnue, written and directed by Hugh M. Jones at the Corner Theatre ETC in 1973.

By 1974, both Johnson and Flax had left Corner Theatre, and operations were taken over by Foster Grimm, a young local director who had recently staged three one-act plays by New York playwright Robert Karmon under the title Karmon. The theatre's emphasis changed during Grimm's leadership, allowing an increasing number of well-established plays to be presented. The physical facility had many improvements in sound and lighting, and a loose relationship was formed with the theatre department of Towson University, which lasted for several years and created an influx of new talent. Playwrights such as Thomas Thorton, Stanley Keyes, James Secor, and Martha Keltz came to the theatre with works including Gangsters, Oil Rich in Mosby, Psychopathology in Everyday Life – A Family Play, The Exorcism, and Cagliostro. New directors also came to the theatre; Grimm directed a series of Sam Shepard plays, and Brad Mays directed, while still in his late teens, a series of Ionesco one-acts, Brian Friel's Lovers, and John Whiting's The Devils. Mays also appeared as an actor in Porterfield's Wolves, as well as Porterfield's final Corner Theatre production, Chancre.

Production design at Corner Theatre was best showcased in 1976 with Yeager's staging of C. Richard Gillespie's Marguerite, starring Linda Chambers, James Hild, and Bruce Johnson, and featuring an electronic score by recording artist Vangelis.

In 1987, director Mays and playwright Stanley Keyes, both living in New York, collaborated to create a feature film comedy based on their experiences at Corner Theatre. The film, Stage Fright, had its world premiere at the 1989 Berlin International Film Festival. In 1977, Corner Theatre lost its lease and Grimm resigned as manager. The theatre was then taken over by local director Barry Feinstein and producer/actor Bruce Godfrey, who moved the operation to 100 East Madison Street. The theatre continued at that location, with a less experimental approach, until the company merged with another Baltimore playhouse, the Fells Point Theatre, to form the Fells Point Corner Theatre in 1987. Fells Point Corner Theatre presented Snow, a Porterfield play, under the direction of Lance Lewman in 1999. The play received top honors at the Baltimore Playwright's Festival.

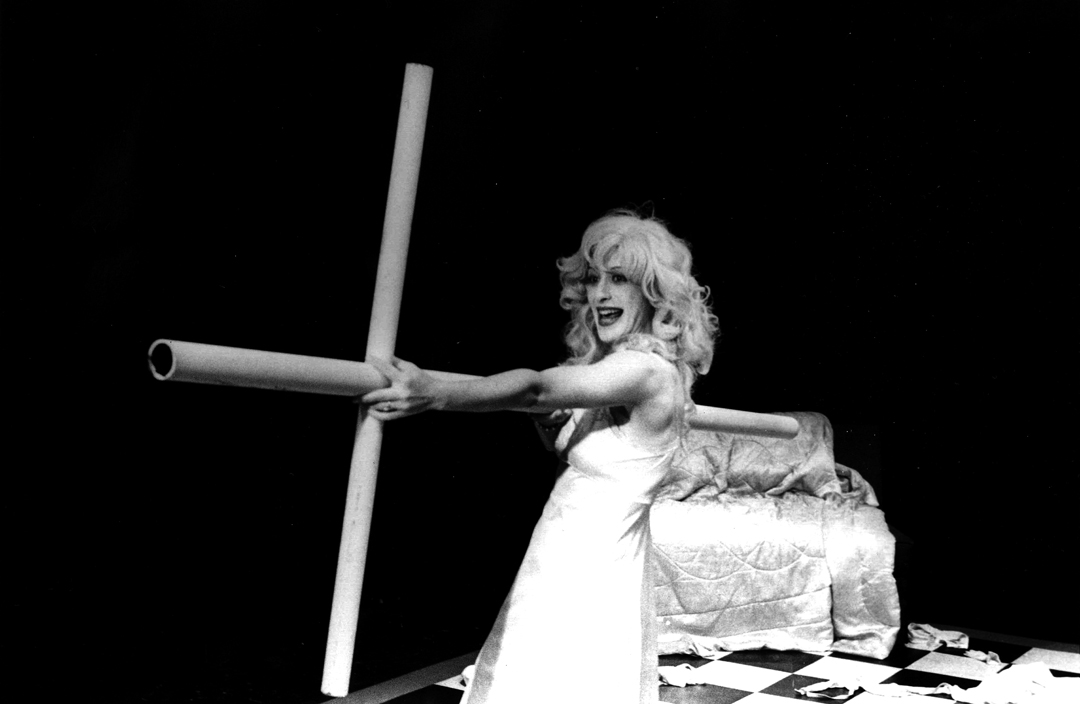
Robin Bittman in scene from The White Whore and the Bit Player, by Tom Eyen, directed by Brad Mays at the Corner Theatre ETC in 1981.

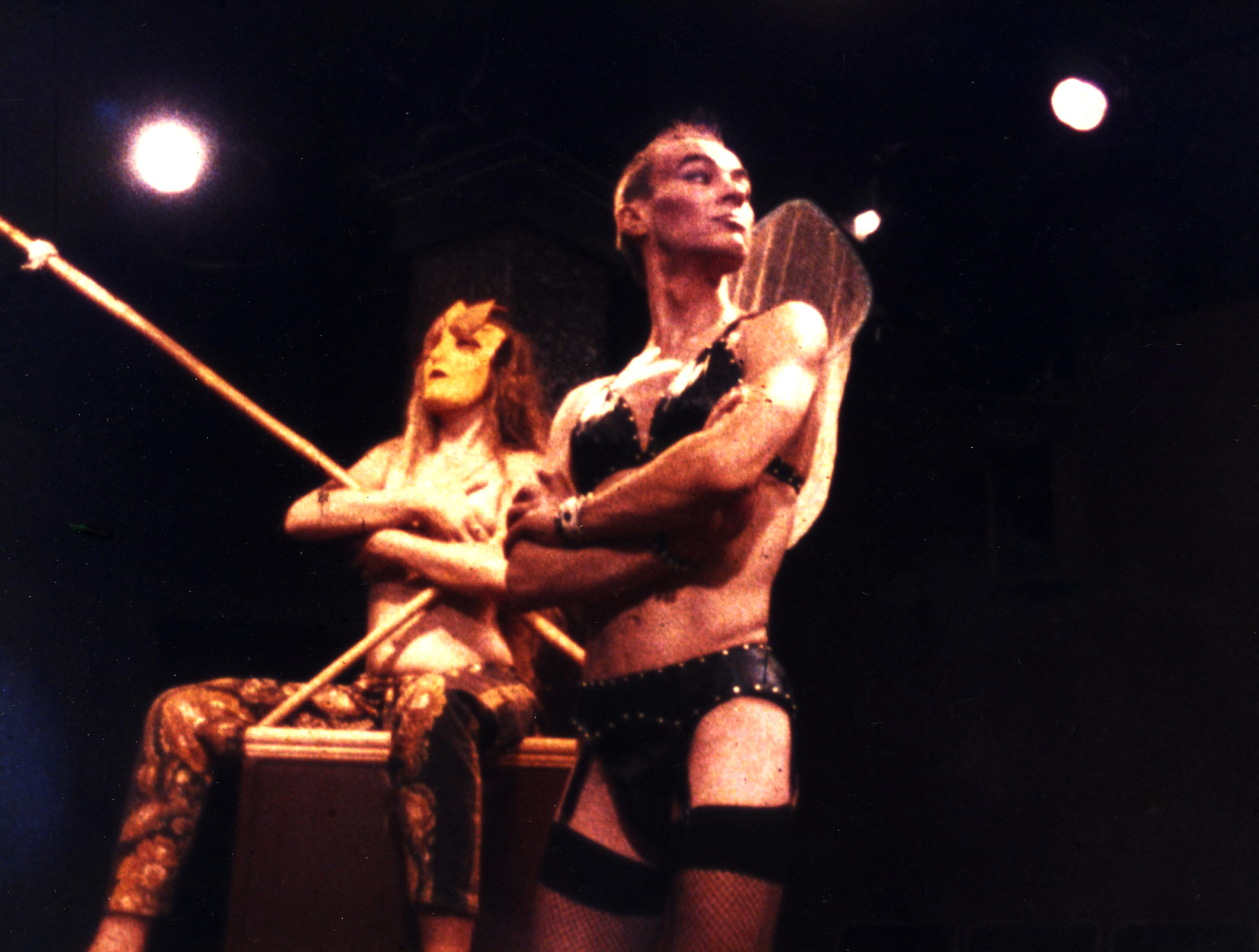
Willie Brookes and Nina Rutledge in a scene from Stage Fright, a 1989 independent feature film inspired by various experiences at "the old" Corner Theatre ETC, written by Stanley Keyes and directed by Brad Mays.

== Other programs at the theatre ==
From its founding, but particularly during Grimm's time as manager, Corner Theatre also offered film screenings, gallery shows, and workshops. Films ranged from Dionysus in '69 and The New York Erotic Film Festival to 16mm films by future underground film legend John Waters, including Multiple Maniacs, Mondo Trasho, and Pink Flamingos. The theatre also held gallery shows by local artists and photographers, and offered its performance space to external theatre groups such as the Baltimore Afro-American Conservatory Theater. Workshops were offered in "human exploration", acting, comedy, directing, and playwriting.

== Partial list of plays ==
- Birdbath by Leonard Melfi (first play produced at Corner Theatre)
- Blues For Mr. Charlie by James Baldwin
- Powah by Robert Behar
- Genesis by John A. Butler
- Pigeons by Lee Dorsey
- Trip Tych by David Epstein
- Scars And Tripe by David Epstein
- The White Whore and the Bit Player by Tom Eyen
- HERE by Dick Flax
- The Burial by C. Richard Gillespie
- Marguerite by C. Richard Gillespie
- John and Marsha Face Life – At The Watergate by Jack Gonzales
- Wanting by Wallace Hamilton
- Tegaroon by Wallace Hamilton
- Rats by Israel Horovitz
- The Chrome Tree by Stan Heuisler
- Inconnue by Hugh M. Jones
- Cagliostro by Martha Keltz
- Oil Rich in Mosby by Stanley Keyes
- The Exorcism by Stanley Keyes
- Chamber Music by Arthur Kopit
- Tiger Skin by Joel Levin
- An Othello by Charles Marowitz
- In Times Like These by Lou Murphy
- Generosity by Dennis O'Keefe
- Authors by Gordon Porterfield
- The Earth Is Dead by Gordon Porterfield
- Gnomes by Gordon Porterfield
- Universal Nigger by Gordon Porterfield
- The Catcher Was A Fag by Gordon Porterfield
- I And Silence Some Strange Race by Gordon Porterfield
- whatisoneholycatholicapostalicbrownandstinksuptheuniverse by Gordon Porterfield
- Wolves by Gordon Porterfield
- Dungbeetle by Gordon Porterfield
- Dirty Pictures by Gordon Porterfield
- Bubble by Gordon Porterfield
- Chancre by Gordon Porterfield
- Fourteen Hundred by Sam Shepard
- Chicago by Sam Shepard
- American Polar by Al Spoler
- Viet Rock by Megan Terry
- Gangsters by Thomas Thorton
- Psychopathology in Every Day Life – A Family Play by Thomas Thorton
- Chiaroscuro by Steve Yeager
- Discoverie
- The Final Heir
- The Man Who Was Overdue
