= Leonard Melfi =

American dramatist

- Born: February 21, 1932; Binghamton, NY, US
- Died: October 28, 2001 (aged 69)

Leonard Melfi (February 21, 1932 – October 28, 2001) was an American playwright and actor whose work has been widely produced on the American stage.

== Life and career ==
Leonard was the eldest child of Leonard and Louise Melfi, who owned and operated the Circle Tavern in Binghamton, New York. In a 1966 radio interview with WBAI's Janet Coleman, he said, "We always talked, and we always cooked together, and while cooking we drank. My father's father was a bootlegger and my mother's father made wine in the cellar... I was sort of doomed." He joked that he had developed his taste for alcohol by "working in the family business."

Melfi briefly attended St. Bonaventure University, followed by a tour of duty in Germany. Upon his discharge from the U.S. Army, Melfi moved to New York City to pursue a playwriting career.

His plays tended to portray social outcasts with dark secrets spontaneously revealed in moments of great anxiety. He was among the most prominent artists making experimental theatre at the beginnings of the off-off-Broadway movement in the 1960s.

Lazy Baby Susan was Melfi's first play to be produced. It took place during the inaugural season at La MaMa Experimental Theatre Club in the East Village of Manhattan in 1962. Melfi's best-known work for the stage, Birdbath, was first produced in 1965 at La MaMa under the direction of Tom O'Horgan. His play Pussies and Rookies was directed at La MaMa in 1965 by Ralph Cook, and his play Niagara Falls was directed at La MaMa by Kevin O'Connor in 1967. In 1968, La MaMa's Ellen Stewart collaborated with actor/producer Leslie Irons to open Corner Theatre ETC in Baltimore. Melfi's Birdbath was that theatre's inaugural production.

Altogether, Melfi wrote over 70 plays during his lifetime. Having Fun in the Bathroom was directed by Ed Setrakian at La MaMa in 1968. The Raven Rock was directed and produced by Wes Jensby at Nassau Community College before traveling to University at Albany, SUNY and then La MaMa in 1969. Horse Opera was directed by Wilford Leach with music by John Braden at La MaMa in 1974. Birdbath was revived at La MaMa, again directed by O'Horgan, in 1981.

Melfi contributed, along with John Lennon and Sam Shepard, to the 1969 Broadway musical Oh, Calcutta! He also co-wrote the screenplay for Mario Monicelli's Lady Liberty, a 1972 film starring William Devane and Sophia Loren. He appeared in the 1984 film Rent Control in the role of Milton Goeller.

A number of Melfi's later plays were produced at the Theater for the New City.

Melfi struggled with alcohol for many years, and eventually moved into the single room occupancy Narragansett Hotel at Broadway and 93rd Street. On October 24, 2001, Melfi's niece tried to visit her uncle and found his door to be locked. She tried again two days later, with no success, and became worried. The following day, paramedics arrived at the hotel and transported Melfi to Mount Sinai Hospital, where he died four hours later of congestive heart failure.

Melfi's body was misplaced by hospital staff and was found four months later in a potter's grave. After weeks of working through bureaucracy, his brother John had Leonard's body exhumed and brought to Campbell Funeral Home. There, the coffin was opened and John verified the body as his brother's. He had the body transferred to DeMarco Funeral Home in Binghamton, and after a complete funeral service including a mass he was buried in the family plot next to his sister in April 2002.

Memorial services were held for the playwright on May 5, 2002, at La MaMa following an April 17 New York Times article describing the playwright's final days. Playwright Edward Albee sent the following note, which was read aloud to those present at the memorial: "Years ago, there were many serious and daring individuals in Greenwich Village under 30 as well as young playwrights, myself included. It was a wild and vital time, and no one was more vital than Leonard."
