= Grace Hayward =

American actress

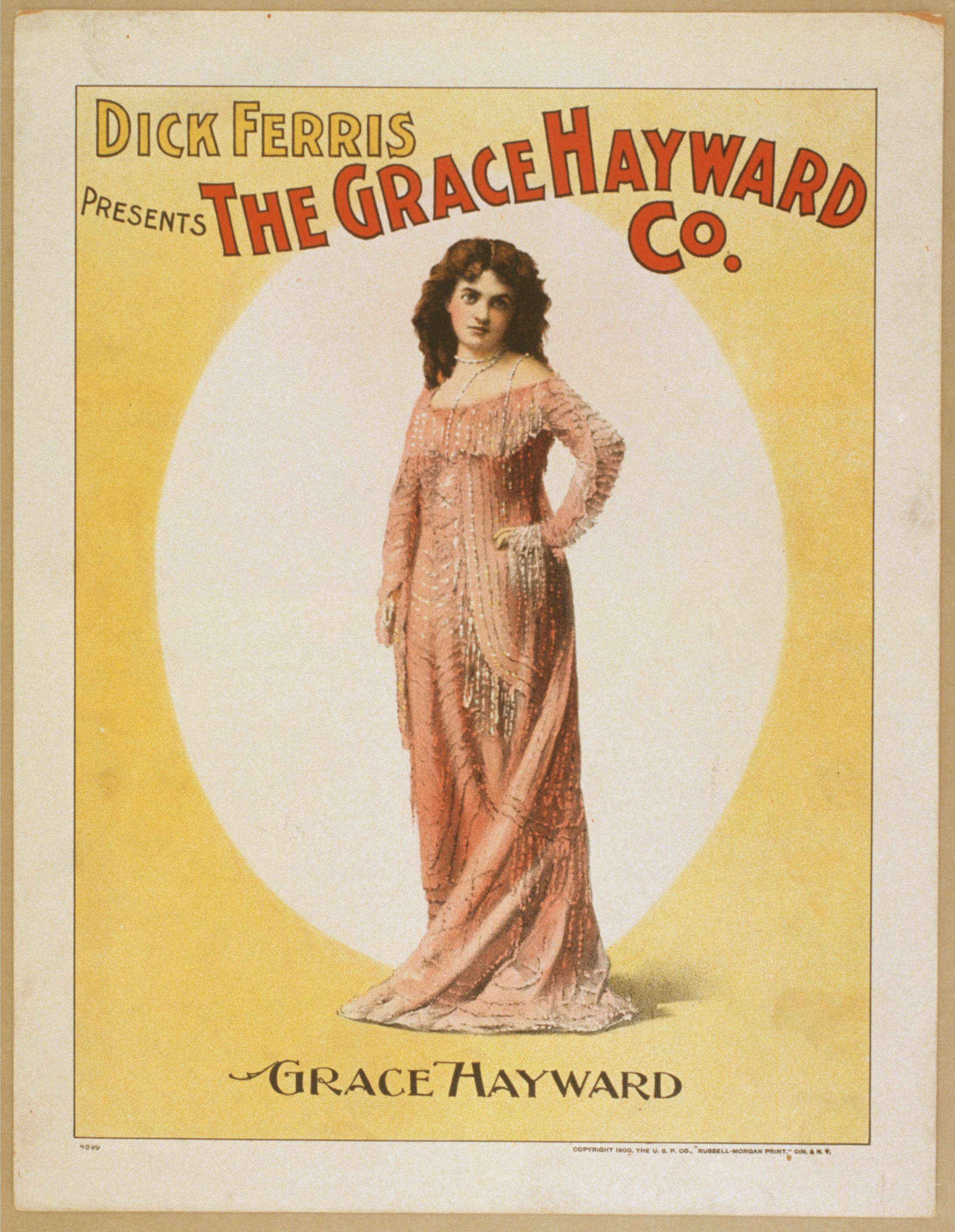
Grace Hayward on a 1900 theatrical poster

Grace Hayward (1868–1959) was an American playwright and actress.

== Early life ==
Hayward was born in 1868 in Terre Haute, Indiana and in 1884, she moved to Mount Carmel, Illinois. Her father was a mail carrier and travel agent. At 13 years old, she ran away from home so that she could be a part of a medicine show. She raised money for feminists including Grace Hall Hemingway. She was married to Chicago theater mogul George Gatts.

== Career ==
In 1901, Hayward started her own theater company with 15 actors, known as the Kerosene Circuit. The Kerosene Circuit performed at the Warrington Opera House from 1909 to 1914. The company performed new shows almost every Monday, including George M. Cohan musicals and comedies that were written by Hayward. The Kerosene Unit usually sold out of the 1,500 seats at the Warrington Opera House. Broadway actor Charles Dingle was a part of the theater company. Beginning around 1913, the company became unsuccessful with some of the actors joining the film industry. The company disbanded in 1920 and Hayward moved to Hollywood as a playwright and radio scriptwriter. Her 1936 play The CCC Murder Mystery was successful although a Syracuse Post-Standard reviewer stated that "no Broadway audience would appreciate it".

== Death and legacy ==
Hayward died in 1959 in Hollywood. Doug Deuchler wrote a play about Hayward's life in 1990.

== Plays ==
- The CCC Murder Mystery
- Graustark; or, Love Behind a Throne
- Lend Me Your Baby
- Little Women
- Some Girl
- Truxton King
