= Jean Anderson Sterrett =

American dramatist

Jean Anderson Sterrett (1924–2022) was an Australian-American pianist, actor, playwright and composer with careers in music and the dramatic arts.

== Early life and education ==
She was born in Toowoomba, Queensland, Australia, and attended boarding school though her high school graduation at The Brigidine Convent, Sydney Australia. She graduated from Sydney Teachers’ College and was awarded scholarships for three years at the Sydney Conservatorium of Music in Sydney, Australia. She earned her Licentiate of Music, Australia and Licentiate of the Royal Schools of Music, London. After World War II, she immigrated to the United States as a war bride to Atlanta, Georgia and later became a naturalized U.S. citizen. She is a lifetime member of the Dramatists Guild.

== Theatrical awards ==
- Los Angeles National Repertory Theater Foundation, National Play Award, 1983, "Afternoons at Waratah", selected out of 820 entries. She was the first female playwright to win this award.
- Mayor's Fellowship in the Arts for Drama, City of Atlanta, GA, 1984, for body of her work
- Harold C. Crain Award, 1986, "The Moebius Band"
- Onassis Foundation - Original Theatrical Plays, Commendation, 2001,“Willie B. Came Into the Sun”
- Essential Theatre, Essential Theatre Playwriting Award, 2007,
- Best Local Playwright, 2007, Creative Loafing, Atlanta, GA, “Fix Me So I Can Stand”, “The Summerhouse in April”

== Two-act plays ==
- The White Rose of Munich^{2}
- Afternoons at Waratah^{3,4,5}
- The Moebius Band^{6}
- Willie B. Came Into the Sun^{7}
- Fix Me So I Can Stand^{9,10}
- The Summerhouse in April^{10}

== Musicals ==
- Aphra, the Life and Times of Aphra Behn
- Mow Mow (for young audiences)
- Letters to Charlie
- A Plague in the Palace
- Sing Hurray (song, skit)

== Screenplay/Novella ==
- The Nature of the Whole

== One Act Plays ==
- H.A. Shahila And Other News
- Shop Till You're Dropped

== Acting Roles ==
1980s

- American Theatre of Actors, NYC, "Afternoons at Waratah" by Jean A. Sterrett, role: Mother
- Alabama Shakespeare Festival, Anniston, AL, "All's Well That Ends Well" by William Shakespere, role, Widow Capulet
- Underground Theatre, Atlanta, GA, "Dylan", role: Caitlan Thomas
- Underground Theatre, Atlanta, GA, "The Silver Cord", role, Mrs. Phelps
- Theatrical Outfit, Atlanta, GA, "The Chalk Garden", role, Mrs. St. Maugham
- Alliance Studio, Atlanta, GA, "A Perfect Analysis Given By A Parrot" by Tennessee Williams, role, Flora
- Seven Stages, Atlanta, GA, "Hamlet Closet Scene, Three Interpretations", role, Gertrude
- Barn Dinner Theatre, Atlanta, GA, "Charley's Aunt", role, Dona Lucia Alvarez
- Neighborhood Theatre, Atlanta, GA, "Arsenic and Old Lace", role, Abbey
- Academy Theatre, Atlanta, GA, "Heavenly Shades of Night Are Falling", role, Janelle

1950s Various Atlanta Theaters

- Idiots Delight, role, Irene
- King Lear, role, Cordelia
- Gigi, role, Aunt Alicia
- The Plough and the Stars, role, Mrs. Gogan
- The Happy Time, role, Mother
- Ten Little Indians, role, Vera
- Witness for the Prosecution, role, Housekeeper
- Heartbreak House, role, Lady Utterword
- I am a Camera, role, Mummy
- The Pursuit of Happiness, role, Meg
- There Shall be No Night, role, Miranda
- Ring Around the Moon, role, Capulet
- The Chalk Garden, role, 1st Applicant
- The Bad Seed, role, Miss Fern

Special Acting Skills: Dialects: British, Cockney, Irish, Scottish, U.S. Southern, Australian

== Prose ==
- “Getting to Know the Customs”, The Phoenix, Morning Star Press, 1976, Vol 5, No 3 & 4.
- “The Art of Splice”, Scholia Satyrica, University of South Florida, Winter 1977, Vol 3, number 1.
- “The Nature of the Whole"
- “Going to Gympie”
- “The Eisteddfod”
- “Across the Wall”
- “Autobiography”
- “Weak at a Glance” (Serial)
- “The Core”

== Pianist ==
- Fox Theatre, Symphonic Variations (written by César Franck) with the Atlanta Pops orchestra.
- Atlanta Symphony Orchestra with Hans Piltz
- Aspen Music Festival
- “Jean Sterrett Pianist”; Volumes 1, 2, and 3; Osiris Studio, Atlanta, GA; 2010
