= Anthony Mora (public relations) =

American journalist

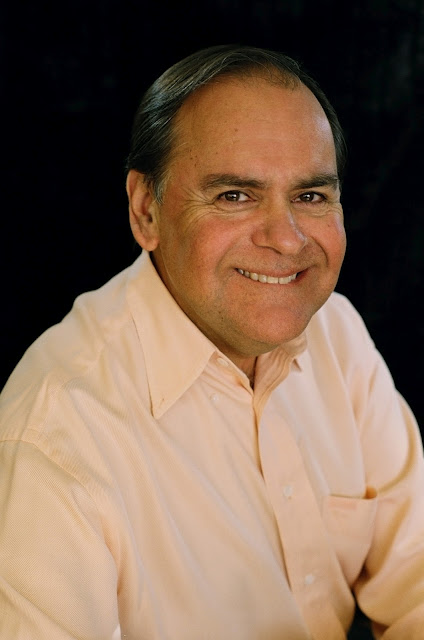
- Anthony Mora
- Occupations: Public Relations, playwright
- Website: http://www.anthonymora.com

Anthony Mora is a Los Angeles publicist, former journalist and magazine editor, entrepreneur, author, playwright, and screenwriter.

== Public Relations ==
Anthony Mora is the founder of Los Angeles-based Anthony Mora Communications, a private company in the PR Agencies industry. Founded in 1990, the agency specializes in media placement, image development, SEO, social media and media training.

As a public relations and media relations expert, Mora has been featured in a number of media outlets including The New York Times, the Los Angeles Times, The Wall Street Journal, CNN, the BBC. His firm represents clients in fields including health, beauty, law, publishing, film, entertainment, technology, and business.

Anthony Mora Communications, Inc. has represented clients including The J Sisters, Hackensack University Medical Center, The Abi Fashion Collection and The Charles Winston Collection, Chuck Henry, HarperCollins and Putnam Publishing. The firm has placed clients in a wide range of media outlets, including Time, Newsweek, 60 Minutes, Vogue, CNN, People, the Today Show, and hundreds of other local, national, and international media outlets.

In 2002, Mora won the Irwin Award for Book Publicist of the Year (Best Fiction Campaign).

Mora's clients in the film industry have included Paramount Pictures, Bigfoot Entertainment, Mitch Anderson, Hilary Henkin, and actresses Roxana Brusso and Holly Hunter.

Mora also works with a number of artists from painters and sculptors to authors, directors and designers. He leads a program titled "P.R. For Artists".

== Books ==
Mora is the author of two non-fiction books, including:

- The Alchemy of Success (motivational, management, leadership; 1997). ISBN 978-0-935016-21-5
- Spin to Win (advertising, marketing, investing; 2003)—Mora's "Zen of media relations," which offers essential truths about getting the media to pay attention to you and/or your company. ISBN 978-1-930709-28-7

== Plays ==
In 2006, Anthony served as the playwright-in-residence at The Sidewalk Studio Theatre. The theatre produced Anthony's play, P.O.P.: The Principles of Perfection, and the world premiere of the full play of Bang! A Love Story.

Mora is the author of five plays:

- Bang! A Love Story (Dragonon Incorporated; 2005). ISBN 978-0-9763398-4-7 Scenes from the controversial, award-winning Bang! featuring ER actress Linda Cardellini were performed at the Acme Theater in Los Angeles and The American Place Theater in New York. Bang! features characters whose core values are upended by youth, and was described in a Los Angeles Times review as "a blend of Vladimir Nabokov and Bret Easton Ellis."
- P.O.P.: The Principles of Perfection (2006) spotlights America's obsession with pop culture, pop stars, pop psychology and pop transformation.
- Modern Love (2009) follows one of Hollywood's most successful blockbuster producers, whose obsession with his directorial debut takes him down a dark, precarious path.
- Silencing Silas (2012) is a one act noir play that features a lethal female lead.
- Hang Fire (2012) is suffused with Mora's trademark edgy, dark humor. It explores the shadow side of sex and power through a sex therapy group turned private revenge clique set on a dangerous vigilante mission.
