= John Walch =

American dramatist

John Walch is an American playwright based in New York City.

== Work ==
John Walch has written award-winning plays, such as Circumference of A Squirrel, Aisle 17B, and The Rebirth of Beautiful. Other plays include The Dinosaur Within, Jesting with Edged Tools, Craving Gravy, The Elements of Style (an adaptation), as well as numerous collaborations and one-acts.

His plays have been produced at theatres such as The Mark Taper Forum, Actors Theatre of Louisville, Zachary Scott Theatre Center, Playwrights Theatre of New Jersey, the State Theater, PACA (Performing Artists Collective Alliance) Erie, Pa, Kitchen Dog Theatre, and off-Broadway at Urban Stages; and they have been developed through the Public Theater New Works Now, Manhattan Theatre Club, A.S.K. Theatre Projects, Shenandoah International Playwright's Retreat, The Playwrights' Center of Minneapolis/PlayLabs, WordBRIDGE, the Mark Taper Forum, and the Theatre Royal Haymarket in London.

== Recognition ==
Walch received a Kennedy Center Fund for New American Plays award for The Dinosaur Within; the Marc Klein Playwriting Award for Jesting with Edged Tools; three Austin Critics Table Awards for "Best Original Script" for Craving Gravy, Circumference of a Squirrel, and The Dinosaur Within; the James Michener Fellowship from the Michener Center for Writers at University of Texas, where he earned his MFA in Playwriting; the 2003 Osborn Award from the American Theatre Critics Association, recognizing an emerging American playwright; and the Charlotte Woolard Award from the Kennedy Center, recognizing a promising new voice in the American theatre. He served as artistic director of Austin Script Works and has taught playwriting at the University of Texas at Austin and the University of Iowa.

Commissions include: Manhattan Theatre Club, where he was an Alfred P. Sloan playwriting fellow, The Playwrights' Center of Minneapolis, and Actors Theatre of Louisville. Mr. Walch currently lives in Fayetteville, Arkansas and is at work on the book for a musical.
