= Vicki Caroline Cheatwood =

American playwright and screenwriter

Vicki Caroline Cheatwood is an American playwright and screenwriter, who has been produced Off-Off-Broadway and throughout the United States.

== Biography ==
Cheatwood is a native of Oklahoma.

In 2002, her screenplay Air (Escopa Films) won the Special Jury Gold Award at Worldfest Film Festival, and in 2005, the dark comedy feature 10:10 was a finalist in the Austin Film Festival. In 2009 her short film Break premiered in New York. She has been a finalist for several national playwriting honors, including the Heideman Award (The Risen Chris, Actors Theater of Louisville), The Julie Harris Playwright Award (An Hour South), and the Eileen Heckart Drama Award (Manicures & Monuments). Current front-burner projects include the feature film script The Road Goes On Forever, based on the hit song by Robert Earl Keen (Caliber Media Company, Beverly Hills, California).

Cheatwood's theater home is Kitchen Dog Theater. She is a core member of Austin Script Works, and a member of the International Centre for Women Playwrights, and the Dramatists Guild. She and her family attend Northaven United Methodist Church.

Cheatwood was married to Mark Daves, who died in 2012.
