= Experimental theatre =

Genre of theater

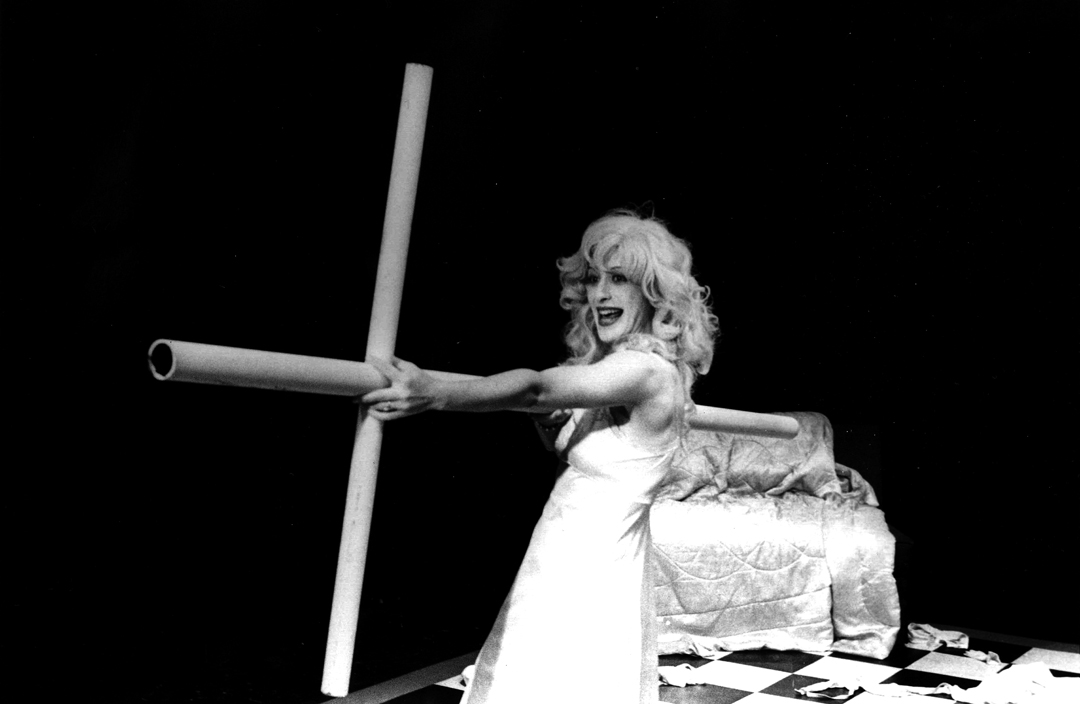
Robin Bittman in Corner Theatre ETC's 1981 production of Tom Eyen's The White Whore and the Bit Player, directed by Brad Mays.

Experimental theatre (also known as avant-garde theatre), inspired largely by Wagner's concept of Gesamtkunstwerk, began in Western theatre in the late 19th century with Alfred Jarry and his Ubu plays as a rejection of both the age in particular and, in general, the dominant ways of writing and producing plays. The term has shifted over time as the mainstream theatre world has adopted many forms that were once considered radical.

Like other forms of the avant-garde, it was created as a response to a perceived general cultural crisis. Despite different political and formal approaches, all avant-garde theatre opposes bourgeois theatre. It tries to introduce a different use of language and the body to change the mode of perception and to create a new, more active relation with the audience.

== Relationships to audience ==
Famed experimental theatre director and playwright Peter Brook describes his task as building "… a necessary theatre, one in which there is only a practical difference between actor and audience, not a fundamental one."

Traditionally audiences are seen as passive observers. Many practitioners of experimental theatre have wanted to challenge this. For example, Bertolt Brecht wanted to mobilise his audiences by having a character in a play break through the invisible "fourth wall", directly ask the audience questions, not giving them answers, thereby getting them to think for themselves; Augusto Boal wanted his audiences to react directly to the action; and Antonin Artaud wanted to affect them directly on a subconscious level. Peter Brook has identified a triangle of relationships within a performance: the performers' internal relationships, the performers' relationships to each other on stage, and their relationship with the audience. The British experimental theatre group Welfare State International has spoken of a ceremonial circle during performance, the cast providing one half, the audience providing another, and the energy in the middle.

Aside from ideological implications of the role of the audience, theatres and performances have addressed or involved the audience in a variety of ways. The proscenium arch has been called into question, with performances venturing into non-theatrical spaces. Audiences have been engaged differently, often as active participants in the action on a highly practical level. When a proscenium arch has been used, its usual use has often been subverted.

Audience participation can range from asking for volunteers to go onstage to having actors scream in audience members' faces. By using audience participation, the performer invites the audience to feel a certain way and by doing so they may change their attitudes, values and beliefs in regard to the performance's topic. For example, in a performance on bullying the character may approach an audience member, size them up and challenge them to a fight on the spot. The terrified look on the audience member's face will strongly embody the message of bullying to the member and the rest of the audience.

Physically, theatre spaces took on different shapes, and practitioners re-explored different ways of staging performance and a lot of research was done into Elizabethan and Greek theatre spaces. This was integrated into the mainstream, the National Theatre in London, for example, has a highly flexible, somewhat Elizabethan traverse space (the Dorfman), a proscenium space (the Lyttelton) and an amphitheatre space (the Olivier) and the directors and architects consciously wanted to break away from the primacy of the proscenium arch. Jacques Copeau was an important figure in terms of stage design, and was very keen to break away from the excesses of naturalism to get to a more pared down, representational way of looking at the stage.

== Social contexts ==
The increase of the production of experimental theaters during the 1950s through the 1960s has prompted some to cite the connection between theater groups and the socio-political contexts in which they operated. Some groups have been prominent in changing the social face of theatre, rather than its stylistic appearance. Performers have used their skills to engage in a form of cultural activism. This may be in the form of didactic agit-prop theatre, or some (such as Welfare State International) see a performance environment as being one in which a micro-society can emerge and can lead a way of life alternative to that of the broader society in which they are placed. For instance, in a study of South American theatrical developments during the 1960s, the Nuevo Teatro Popular materialized amid the change and innovations entailed in the social and political developments of the period. This theatrical initiative was organized around groups or collective driven by specific events and performed themes tied to class and cultural identity that empowered their audience and help create movements that spanned national and cultural borders. These included Utopian projects, which sought to reconstruct social and cultural production, including their objectives.

Augusto Boal used the Legislative Theatre on the people of Rio to find out what they wanted to change about their community, and he used the audience reaction to change legislation in his role as a councillor. In the United States, the tumultuous 1960s saw experimental theater emerging as a reaction to the state's policies on issues like nuclear armament, racial social injustice, homophobia, sexism and military–industrial complex. The mainstream theater was increasingly seen from as a purveyor of lies, hence, theatrical performances were often seen as a means to expose what is real and this entails a focus on hypocrisy, inequality, discrimination, and repression. This is demonstrated in the case of Grotowski, who rejected the lies and contradictions of mainstream theater and pushed for what he called as truthful acting in the performances of his Poor Theater as well as his lectures and workshops.

Experimental theatre encourages directors to make society, or our audience at least, change their attitudes, values, and beliefs on an issue and to do something about it. The distinction was explained in the conceptualization of experimentation that "goes much deeper and much beyond than merely a new form/or novel content" but "a light that illuminates one's work from within. And this light in the spirit of quest – not only aesthetic quest – it is an amalgam of so many quests – intellectual, aesthetic, but most of all, spiritual quest."

== Methods of creation ==
Traditionally, there is a highly hierarchical method of creating theatre - a writer identifies a problem, a writer writes a script, a director interprets it for the stage together with the actors, the performers perform the director and writer's collective vision. Various practitioners started challenging this and started seeing the performers more and more as creative artists in their own right. This started with giving them more and more interpretive freedom and devised theatre eventually emerged. This direction was aided by the advent of ensemble improvisational theater, as part of the experimental theatre movement, which did not need a writer to develop the material for a show or "theater piece". In this form the lines were devised by the actors or performers.

Within this many different structures and possibilities exist for performance makers, and a large variety of different models are used by performers today. The primacy of the director and writer has been challenged directly, and the directors role can exist as an outside eye or a facilitator rather than the supreme authority figure they once would have been able to assume.

As well as hierarchies being challenged, performers have been challenging their individual roles. An inter-disciplinary approach becomes more and more common as performers have become less willing to be shoe-horned into specialist technical roles. Simultaneous to this, other disciplines have started breaking down their barriers. Dance, music, video art, visual art, new media art and writing become blurred in many cases, and artists with completely separate trainings and backgrounds collaborate very comfortably.

== Interculturalism and Orientalism in Experimental Theatre ==
In their efforts to challenge the realism of western drama, many modernists looked to other cultures for inspiration. Indeed, Artaud has often credited the Balinese dance traditions as a strong influence on his experimental theories: his call for a departure from language in the theatre, he says, partially came to him as a concept after having seen the Balinese Theatre's performance at the Colonial Exhibition in Paris in 1931. He was particularly interested in the symbolic gestures performed by the dancers and their intimate connection to the music; in his Notes on Oriental, Greek and Indian Cultures, we find a curiosity as to what the French theatre scene could become if it pulled from traditions such as Noh and Balinese dance.

Similarly, it is in his essay on Chinese acting that Brecht used the term Verfremdungseffekt for the first time. Brecht's essay, written shortly after having witnessed performer Mei Langfang's demonstration of a few Peking Opera performance practices in 1935 Moscow, elaborates on his experience on his experience feeling "alienated" by Mei's performance: Brecht notably mentions the absence of a fourth wall in the demonstration, which later on became a staple in Brechtian theatre, and the "stylistic" nature of the performance; another key concept which would find its way into Brecht's later theories. In fact, three of Brecht's plays are set in China (The Measures Taken, The Good Person of Szechwan, and Turandot)

Yeats, pioneer of the modernist and symbolist movement, discovered Noh drama in 1916, as detailed in his essay Certain Noble Plays of Japan, which reveals a strong interest in the musicality and stillness of the Noh performance. His production of the same year, At the Hawk's Well was created by loosely following the rules of a Noh Play: Yeats' attempt at exploring Noh's spiritual power, its lyrical tone and its synthesis of dance, music and verse.

Additionally, Gordon Craig repeatedly theorized about "the idea of danger in the Indian theatre", as a potential solution to the lack of risk-taking in the western theatre, and some might argue his theories about an über-marionette actor could be compared to the kathakali training. In 1956, Grotowski too found himself an interest for Eastern performance practices, and experimented with using some aspects of Kathakali in his actor training program. He had studied the South-Indian tradition in Kerala, at the Kalamandalam.

In many cases, these practitioners' pulling of theatrical conventions from the East came from their desire to explore unexpected or novel approaches to theatre-making. Audiences at the time were not often exposed to Eastern theatre practices, and the latter were hence a powerful tool for modernists: Brecht could easily generate the alienation of his western audiences by presenting them with these supposedly "strange" and "foreign" theatrical conventions they were simply not familiar with. Artaud and Yeats could experiment with the musicality and ritualistic nature of Eastern dance traditions as a means to reconnect the western theatre to the mystical and to the universe; and both Grotowski and Craig could draw from the kathakali performers' training as a means to challenge the western theatre's sole focus on psychological truth and truthful behavior.

However, their exposure to these theatre traditions was extremely limited: these theatre-makers's understandings of the Eastern traditions they were pulling from were often limited to a few readings, translations of Chinese and Japanese works, and, in the case of Brecht and Artaud, the witnessing of an out-of-context demonstration of Balinese Theatre Dance and Peking Opera conventions. Remaining geographically distant, for the most part, of the traditions they wrote about, the "oriental theatre" could hence be argued to be more of a construct than a true practice for these theatre-makers. While they do pull from Eastern traditions, Brecht, Artaud, Yeats, Craig and Artaud's respective articulations of their vision for theatre predate their exposure to these practices: their approach to Eastern theatre traditions were filtered "through a personal agenda", and the absence of earnest curiosity for the oriental theatre could be argued to have led to its misinterpretation and distortion in the modernist movement.

Furthermore, Eastern theatre was repeatedly reduced by these western practitioners to an exotic, mystical form. It is important here to acknowledge the importance of cultural context in theatre-making: these practitioners' isolating of a particular ritual or convention from its broader cultural significance and social context shows perhaps that this "questionable exoticization" was customarily used to push their own preconceived notions about the theatre, rather than to explore the culture they were borrowing from.

== Physical effects ==
Experimental theatre alters traditional conventions of space (black box theater), theme, movement, mood, tension, language, symbolism, conventional rules and other elements.

== See also ==
- Performance art
- Physical theatre
- Improvisational theatre
- Postdramatic theatre
- Experimental theatre in the Arab world
- Fringe theatre
- Music theatre
