= St. Wilfrid Club =

Club in New York City

- Formation: 1908
- Type: Dining club
- Purpose: Organists
- Location: New York, NY, United States
- Region served: New York metropolitan area
- Members: private persons

The St. Wilfrid Club is a dining club for organists of recognized standing in the greater New York City and tri-state area. The object of the club is to promote social discourse among its members and to further the interests of organists.

== Origins ==
The club was founded in 1908, following an October 5 dinner meeting convened by Dr. Leighton Parks, rector of St. Bartholomew's Church, to introduce 17 of the city's leading church musicians to Arthur S. Hyde, Leopold Stokowski's successor as St. Bartholomew's organist. The founders named the club in honor of Saint Wilfrid (sometimes spelled Wilfred or Wilfrith, c.633 – c.709), an influential English bishop known for his strong advocacy of sacred music. In a typical year, the club would have three formal dinner meetings with invited guest speakers.

== Membership ==
The club was limited to 25 members at first, and membership was still just 30 in 1939. Today there are three classes of membership: resident, non-resident, and honorary. Resident members, currently limited to 85 in number, consist of organists of recognized standing who work in greater New York City or within a radius of 60 miles of New York City. While election to the club is limited to those who meet these requirements, there are no other exclusions to club membership. Prospective members are proposed and seconded by current resident members in good standing and voted on by the entire membership. New members may be nominated as vacancies occur. Organists of note, outstanding professional musicians who are not organists, and others who have rendered distinguished service in any line of endeavor, may be elected honorary members through the same process of balloting as that for resident members.

Resident members, upon removing from the greater New York City area, automatically become non-resident members. Other organists of recognized standing, who reside at a considerable distance from New York, may be elected to non-resident membership through the same process as that for resident members. A non-resident member returning or moving to work in the greater New York City area may request to be transferred to the resident member list, if and when there is a vacancy.

Members in all three categories enjoy equal club access and privileges, except the holding of office and voting, which is confined to resident members. Regular attendance is expected as evidence of active interest in the club. If unable to attend a meeting, resident and non-resident members are asked to notify the Secretary of the club. Those who consistently fail to reply may be asked to resign in order to secure openings for proposals of candidates who may have expressed interest in membership.

While there are no secret rituals or other specific attributes of membership, the identities of the club's living members are not generally known except to other members.

== Governance ==
The club is governed by a chair, elected for a term of two years (originally one year), together with an executive committee consisting of two members, who are also elected for a term of two years. Two years must have elapsed before the chair, or members of the executive committee may be re-elected. Two other officers maintain the operation of the club: a recording secretary and a treasurer, who are each elected for a term of two years, but who are eligible for re-election without restriction.

== Notable past members ==
Some notable Chairs of the past include Gerrit Smith, J. Christopher Marks, Walter Henry Hall, T. Tertius Noble, R. Huntington Woodman, Walter C. Gale, Samuel A. Baldwin, Seth Bingham, John Hyatt Brewer, Edward Shippen Barnes, S. Lewis Elmer, Norman Coke-Jephcott, Maurice Garabrant, Hugh Porter, Vernon de Tar, Ray F. Brown, T. Frederick Candlyn, Jack Ossewaarde, Philip James, Harold Friedell, Alec Wyton, Willard Irving Nevins, Donald Coats, Bassett Hough, George Markey, William Self, George Powers, Richard Westenburg, Charles Dodsley Walker, Gerre Hancock, Leonard Raver, Frank Cedric Smith, William Whitehead, and Eugene W. Hancock.

Other notable members have included James M. Helfenstein, William C. Carl, Clement R. Gale, Clarence Eddy, Charles Whitney Coombs, Horatio Parker, Bruno Siegfried Huhn, Clarence Dickinson, Frank Sill Rogers, Charles Ives, Clifford Demarest, Gaston Dethier, Mark Andrews, David McK. Williams, Charles M. Courboin, Ernest White, Édouard Nies-Berger, Carl Weinrich, Virgil Fox, and Searle Wright.

Prominent honorary members have included Vasily Safonov, Victor Herbert, David Mannes, Joseph Bonnet, Marcel Dupré, Sir William McKie, Harold Gleason, Maurice Duruflé, and Pierre Cochereau.
