= Leighton Parks =

Leighton Parks (10 February 1852-21 March 1938) was a liberal American Protestant Episcopal clergyman.

== Biography ==
He was born in New York City and graduated from the General Theological Seminary in 1876. Ordained a priest the next year, from 1878 to 1904 he was the third rector of Emmanuel Church, Boston. He then became rector of St. Bartholomew's Church, New York, succeeding David H. Greer, who had been elected Bishop of the diocese. He was "a militant defender of theological modernism who denied the Virgin birth and defied the Bishops of his church to unfrock him for heresy". Dr. Parks, who became noted for his direct and uncompromising preaching to one of the wealthiest congregations in the country, published The Winning of the Soul and Other Sermons (1893) and Moral Leadership and Other Sermons (1914). He first came to widespread attention when he "made a spirited attack" on the Roman Catholic Church, claiming it sought "political domination and a war with Great Britain". Mrs. Cornelius Vanderbilt Sr. ceased to worship at St. Bartholomew's following Parks's attacks on conservative elements within his own church. On the more-diplomatic side, in 1908, Parks convened a dinner meeting of New York church musicians, which continues to this day as St. Wilfrid Club, a longstanding organization of prominent organists.

In 1878, Parks married Margaret Alden Haven, an expatriate then living in Geneva, Switzerland, and they became the parents of at least three daughters. He was living with his daughter Alice Margareta Parks, wife of Sir John Nicholson Barran, 2nd Bt, in London at the time of his death.
