= List of compositions by Marcel Dupré =

Below is a sortable list of compositions by Marcel Dupré. The works are categorized by genre, opus number, date of composition and titles.

Genre	Opus	Date	Original title (French title)	English title	Notes
Keyboard: organ	–	1895	Prière en sol mineur	Prayer in G minor	dedicated to "Papa" (Albert Dupré)
Keyboard: organ	–	1895	Fugue en ut majeur	Fugue in C major	unpublished
Vocal	–	1897	La Fleur	The flower	for voice and piano
Vocal	–	1898	Oudlette dans le Puits	Oudlette at the well	for voice and piano
Chamber music	–	1898	Menuet pour piano, violon et violoncelle	Minuet	for violin, cello and piano
Keyboard: piano	–	1898	Marche des Paysans	The Peasants' March	unpublished
Keyboard: piano	–	1899	Barcarolle	Barcarolle	unpublished
Keyboard: piano	–	1899	Canon	Canon	unpublished
Keyboard: piano	–	1899	Danse du Tambourin	Tambourine dance	unpublished
Keyboard: piano	–	1900	Valse en ut dièse mineur	Waltz in C♯ minor	unpublished
Keyboard: organ	–	1900	Fugue en fa majeur	Fugue in F major	unpublished
Keyboard: organ	–	1901	Fugue en la mineur	Fugue in A minor	unpublished
Chamber music	–	1901	Sonate (Allegro) en ut majeur, Trio	Sonata-Allegro in C major	unpublished
Choral	–	1901	Le vision de Jacob, Cantate	Jacob's vision	unpublished
Keyboard: piano	–	1902	Pièce caractéristique	Characteristic piece	unpublished
Choral	1	1911	Les normands	The Normans	for chorus and orchestra
Keyboard: organ	2	1912	Élévation en si bémol majeur	Elevation in B-flat major	for organ or harmonium
Vocal	3	1914	Le Glaive	The sword	for soprano and orchestra
Vocal	4	1914	Psyché	Psyche	for voice and orchestra; cantate du Prix de Rome
Chamber music	5	1909	Sonate en sol mineur	Sonata in G minor	for violin and piano
Vocal	6	1913	4 Mélodies: 1. Sous la pluie (Chansons de Bilitis); 2. Roses dans la nuit (Chansons de Bilitis); 3. Marquise; 4. Les deux sœurs	4 Songs	for voice and piano 1.~2. words by Pierre Louÿs; 3. words by Paul Armand Silvestre; 4. words by Victor Hugo
Keyboard: organ	7	1912	3 Préludes et fugues: 1. en si majeur 2. en fa mineur 3. en sol mineur	3 Preludes and Fugues: 1. in B major 2. in F minor 3. in G minor	
Concertante	8	1912	Fantaisie en si mineur	Fantasia in B minor	for piano and orchestra, double piano reduction exists
Vocal	9	1916	4 Motets: 1. O salutaris hostia 2. Ave Maria; 3. Tantum ergo 4. Laudate	4 Motets: 1. O salutaris hostia 2. Ave Maria; 3. Tantum ergo 4. Laudate	for voice and 2 organs
Chamber music	10	1917	2 Pièces: 1. Nocturne; 2. Vivace	2 Pieces: 1. Nocturne; 2. Vivace	for clarinet and piano
Vocal	11	1911	À l'amie perdue, 7 Mélodies: 1. Nos yeux seuls...; 2. Quand je l'embrasserai...; 3. Si mon amour...; 4. O les divins moments...; 5. Je ne t'ai point connue...; 6. Viens chercher sur mon cœur...; 7. Une lueur au ciel...	To the lost lover	for voice and piano; words by Auguste Angellier
Keyboard: piano	12	1916	6 Préludes	6 Préludes: 1. in E♭ major 2. in E♭ minor 3. in A major 4. in D minor 5. in F major 6. in B♭ minor	
Chamber music	13	1916	2 Pièces: 1. Légende; 2. Cantilène	2 Pieces: 1. Légende; 2. Cantilène	for cello and piano
Keyboard: piano	14	1915	Marche militaire	Military march	also orchestrated
Orchestral	14	1915	Marche militaire	Military march	original for piano
Orchestral	15	1916	Orientale	Oriental	
Chamber music	–	1916	Berceuse infantine	A child's lullaby	for cello and piano
Keyboard: organ	16	1918	Scherzo en fa mineur	Scherzo in F minor	originally Sortie
Choral	17	1917	De Profundis	De Profundis	for soprano, tenor and bass soloists, mixed chorus, organ and orchestra (or organ solo)
Keyboard: organ	18	1919	15 Versets sur les Vêpres du commun des fêtes de la Sainte Vierge 5 Antiennes des Psaumes 4 Versets de l'hymne "Ave Maris Stella" 6 Versets de Magnificat	15 Pieces Founded on Antiphons: 1. Antiphon 1: While the King Sitteth at His Table; 2. Antiphon 2: His Left Hand Is Under My Head, and His Right Hand Doth Embrace Me; 3. Antiphon 3: I Am Black but Comely, O Ye Daughters of Jerusalem; 4. Antiphon 4: Lo, the Winter Is Past; 5. Antiphon 5: How Fair and How Pleasant Art Thou; 6. Ave Maris Stella 1: When the Salutation Gabriel Had Spoken; 7. Ave Maris Stella 2: Jesus Tender Mother, Make Thy Supplication; 8. Ave Maris Stella 3: So Now as We Journey, Aid Our Weak Endeavor; 9. Ave Maris Stella 4: Amen (Finale); 10. Magnificat 1: My Soul Doth Magnify the Lord; 11. Magnificat 2: For Behold from Henceforth All Generations Shall Call Me Blessed; 12. Magnificat 3: And His Mercy Is on Them That Fear Him Throughout All Generations; 13. Magnificat 4: He Hath Put Down the Mighty from Their Seat (Cantilena); 14. Magnificat 5: He Remembring His Mercy Hath Holpen His Servant Israel; 15. Magnificat 6: Gloria (Finale)	literally: "15 Vesper-Verses for the feasts of the Blessed Virgin". commissioned by and dedicated to Claude Johnson
Keyboard: piano	19	1921	4 Pièces: 1. Étude; 2. Cortège et litanie 3. Chanson; 4. Ballet	4 Pieces: 1. Study; 2. Cortege and litany 3. Song; 4. Ballet	
Keyboard: organ	19	1921, 1923	Cortège et litanie	Cortege and litany	original for piano; also for organ and orchestra (1925)
Concertante	19	1921, 1925	Cortège et litanie	Cortege and litany	for organ and orchestra; original for piano; also for organ (1923)
Keyboard: organ	20	1922	Variations sur un vieux Noël en ré mineur (Variations sur un Noël)	Variations on an Old Noël in D minor	
Keyboard: organ	21	1923	Suite Bretonne: 1. Berceuse; 2. Fileuse; 3. Les Cloches de Perros-Guirec	Breton Suite: 1. Lullaby; 2. The Spinneress; 3. The Bells of Perros-Guirec	
Keyboard: piano	22	1924	Variations en ut dièse mineur	Variations in C♯ minor	dedicated to Alfred La Liberté
Keyboard: organ	23	1924	Prémiere symphonie "Passion" pour grand-orgue en ré mineur (Symphonie-Passion): 1. Le monde dans l'attente du Sauveur sur « Jesu, redemptor omnium »; 2. Nativité sur « Adeste fideles »; 3. Crucifixion sur « Stabat mater dolorosa »; 4. Résurrection sur « Adoro te devote»	Passion Symphony (no. 1) in D minor: 1. The world awaits the saviour (on Jesu, redemptor omnium); 2. The Nativity (on Adeste Fideles); 3. The Crucifixion (on Stabat Mater); 4. The Resurrection (on Adoro te devote)	basis improvised at the Wanamaker Organ
Keyboard: organ	24	1926	Lamento en si bémol mineur	Lament in B♭ minor	in memory of Donald Henderson, 3 year old son of friends of Dupré
Concertante	25	1927	Symphonie en sol mineur	Symphony in G minor	for organ and orchestra
Keyboard: organ	26	1929	Deuxième Symphonie en ut dièse mineur: 1. Preludio; 2. Intermezzo; 3. Toccata	Symphony No. 2 in C♯ minor: 1. Preludio; 2. Intermezzo; 3. Toccata	
Keyboard: organ	27	1931	7 Pièces: 1. Souvenir; 2. Marche; 3. Pastorale; 4. Carillon; 5. Canon; 6. Légende; 7. Final	7 Pieces: 1. Souvenir; 2. March; 3. Pastorale; 4. Carillon; 5. Canon; 6. Legend; 7. Finale	
Keyboard: organ	28	1931	79 Chorals	79 Chorales	
Keyboard: organ	29	1931	Le Chemin de la croix, 14 Stations: 1. Jésus est condamné à mort 2. Jésus est chargé de la Croix; 3. Jésus tombe sous le poids de sa Croix; 4. Jésus rencontre sa mère 5. Simon de Cyrénéen aide Jésus à porter sa Croix; 6. Une femme pieuse essuie la face de Jésus; 7. Jésus tombe à terre pour la seconde foix 8. Jésus console les filles d'Israël qui le suivent 9. Jésus tombe pour la troisième fois 10. Jésus est dépouillé de ses vêtements 11. Jésus est attaché sur la Croix; 12. Jésus meurt sur la Croix; 13. Jésus est détaché de la Croix et remis à sa Mère; 14. Jésus est mis dans le sépulcre	The Way of the Cross (The Stations of the Cross): 1. Jesus Is Condemned to Death; 2. Jesus Receives His Cross; 3. Jesus Falls the First Time; 4. Jesus Meets His Mother; 5. Simon the Cyrene Helps Jesus to Carry the Cross; 6. Jesus and Veronica; 7. Jesus Falls a Second Time; 8. Jesus Comforts the Women of Jerusalem; 9. Jesus Falls a Third Time; 10. Jesus Is Stripped of His Clothes; 11. Jesus Is Nailed on the Cross; 12. Jesus Dies upon the Cross; 13. The Body of Jesus Is Taken from the Cross and Laid in Mary's Bosom; 14. The Body of Jesus Is Laid in the Tomb	
Keyboard	30	1932	Ballade en la mineur	Ballad in A minor	for piano and organ, for him and his daughter Marguerite
Concertante	31	1934	Concerto en mi mineur	Concerto in E minor	for organ and orchestra, has been reduced to a version for organ and piano as well
Keyboard: organ	32	1935	3 Élévations: 1. en mi majeur 2. en la mineur 3. en sol majeur	3 Elevations: 1. in E major 2. in A minor 3. in G major	
Concertante	33	1935	Poème héroïque	Heroic Poem	for organ, brass and field drum; dedicated to Verdun; also exists in an orga solo arrangement
Choral	34	1917	Ave verum	Ave verum	for soloists, chorus, organ and orchestra
Keyboard: organ	34	1936	Angélus	Angelus	published with Ave verum
Keyboard	35	1937	Variations sur deux thèmes en ut dièse mineur	Variations on Two Themes in C♯ minor	for piano and organ
Keyboard: organ	36	1938	3 Préludes et fugues: 1. en mi mineur 2. en la bémol majeur 3. en ut majeur	3 Préludes and Fugues: 1. in E minor 2. in A♭ major 3. in C major	
Keyboard: organ	37	1941	Évocation, Poème symphonique: 1. Moderato; 2. Adagio con tenerezza 3. Allegro deciso	The Evocation, Symphonic Poem: 1. Moderato; 2. Adagio con tenerezza 3. Allegro deciso	in memory of Albert Dupré (his father). For the organ of Saint-Ouen Abbey, Rouen.
Keyboard: organ	38	1942	Le Tombeau de Titelouze: 1. Creator Alme Siderum; 2. Jesu Redemptor Omnium; 3. O Solis Ortus Cardine; 4. Audi Benigne Conditor; 5. Te Lucis Ante Terminum; 6. Cœlestis Urbs Jerusalem; 7. Ad Regias Agni Dapes; 8. Veni Creator Spiritus; 9. Vexilla Regis; 10. Pange Lingua; 11. Ave Maris Stella; 12. Iste Confessor; 13. Lucis Creator Optime; 14. Ut Queant Laxis; 15. Te Splendor Et Virtus; 16. Placare Christe Servulis	The Grave of Titelouze	dedicated "à Monsieur l'Abbé Robert Delestre, Maître de Chapelle de la Cathédrale de Rouen"
Concertante	–	1943	Résonances	Resonances	for organ and orchestra
Keyboard: organ	39	1944	Suite en fa mineur: 1. Allegro agitato 2. Cantabile; 3. Scherzando; 4. Final	Suite in F minor: 1. Allegro agitato 2. Cantabile; 3. Scherzando; 4. Finale	
Keyboard: organ	40	1944	Offrande à la Vierge: 1. Virgo mater 2. Mater dolorosa 3. Virgo mediatrix	Offering to the Virgin: 1. Virgo mater 2. Mater dolorosa 3. Virgo mediatrix	
Keyboard: organ	41	1945	3 Esquisses: 1. en ut majeur 2. en mi mineur 3. en si bémol mineur	3 Sketches: 1. in C major 2. in E minor 3. in B♭ minor	first study published later after the latter two
Keyboard	42	1946	Sinfonia	Sinfonia	for piano and organ
Keyboard: organ	43	1945	Paraphrase sur le Te Deum	Paraphrase on the Te Deum	
Keyboard: organ	44	1947	Vision, Poème symphonique	Vision, Symphonic Poem	
Keyboard: organ	45	1948	8 Petits préludes sur des thèmes grégoriens: 1. Salve regina 2. Virgo Dei genitrix 3. Pange lingua 4. Sacris solemniis 5. Alma redemptoris mater 6. Ave verum corpus 7. Lauda Sion; 8. Verbum supernum	8 Short Preludes on Gregorian Themes	
Keyboard: organ	46	1948	Miserere Mei	Miserere Mei	
Keyboard: organ	–	1948	Épithalame	Epithalamium	for the wedding of his daughter Marguerite to Emmanuel Tollet, improvised then transcribed
Keyboard: organ	–	1948	Variations sur «Il est né le divin Enfant», Offertoire	Variations on "He was born a divine Child", Offertory	written as an offertory for his daughter Marguerite, improvised then transcribed
Keyboard: organ	47	1949	Psaume XVIII, Poème symphonique: 1. Cœli Enarrant Gloriam Dei; 2. Adagio; 3. Allegro Moderato	Psalm 18, Symphonic Poem	
Keyboard: organ	48	1952	6 Antiennes pour le temps de Noël: 1. Ecce Dominus veniet 2. Omnipotens sermo tuus 3. Tecum principium, in die virtutis tuæ 4. Germinavit radix Jesse; 5. Stella ista 6. Lumen ad revelationem		
Choral	49	1953	La France au Calvaire, Oratorio	France at Cavalry, Oratorio	for soloists, chorus, organ and orchestra; dedicated to the memory of his mother and father Alice and Albert
Keyboard: organ	50	1956	24 Inventions	24 Inventions	
Keyboard: organ	51	1957	Triptyque: 1. Chaconne; 2. Musette; 3. Dithyrambe	Triptych: 1. Chaconne; 2. Musette; 3. Dithyrambe	
Chamber music	52	1958	Quatuor pour violon, alto, violoncelle et orgue	Quartet	for violin, viola, cello and organ
Choral	53	1958	2 Motets: 1. Memorare, o piissima Virgo; 2. Alma Redemptoris Mater	2 Motets: 1. Memorare, o piissima Virgo; 2. Alma Redemptoris Mater	for soprano and chorus
Keyboard: organ	54	1959	Nymphéas: 1. Rayons; 2. Brumes; 3. Les Fleurs; 4. Temps Lourds; 5. Brises; 6. Nocturne; 7. Aube; 8. Vapeurs Dorées	Water lilies: 1. Rayons; 2. Brumes; 3. Les Fleurs; 4. Temps Lourds; 5. Brises; 6. Nocturne; 7. Aube; 8. Vapeurs Dorées	composed for his own organ in Meudon; will be published in 2021
Chamber music	55	1960	Trio pour violon, violoncelle et orgue	Trio	for violin, cello and organ
Keyboard: organ	56	1961	Annonciation, 2 Méditations	Annunciation, 2 Meditations: 1. E major 2. G major	
Keyboard: organ	57	1962	Choral et fugue	Chorale and Fugue	
Keyboard: organ	58	1963	3 Hymnes: 1. Matines; 2. Vêpres; 3. Laudes	3 Hymns: 1. Matines; 2. Vêpres; 3. Laudes	
Keyboard: organ	59	1963	2 Chorales: 1. Freu dich sehr, o meine Seele; 2. Liebster Immanuel, Herzog der Frommen	2 Chorales: 1. Rejoice Greatly, O My Soul; 2. Dearest Immanuel, Lord of the Faithful	
Chamber music	60	1964	Sonate en la mineur	Sonata in A minor	for cello and organ
Keyboard: organ	61	1965	In Memoriam, 6 Pièces pour orgue «à ma fille» (Marguerite): 1. Prélude; 2. Allegretto; 3. Méditation; 4. Quod libet 5. Ricercare; 6. Postlude	In Memory, 6 Pieces: 1. Prélude; 2. Allegretto; 3. Méditation; 4. Quod libet 5. Ricercare; 6. Postlude	dedicated to Dupré's daughter Marguerite Tollet
Keyboard: organ	–	1966	Méditation	Meditation	in F major, commissioned by Henry and Enid Woodward for their Library of Organ Music
Keyboard: organ	62	1967	Entrée, Canzona et Sortie	Entry, Chanson, Postlude	
Keyboard: organ	63	1968	4 Fugues modales: 1. Dorien; 2. Phrygien; 3. Locrien; 4. Ionien	4 Modal Fugues: 1. Dorian; 2. Phrygian; 3. Locrian; 4. Ionian	
Keyboard: organ	64	1969	Regina cœli	Regina cœli	to former pupil Denise Raffy; published with a piece by Rolande Falcinelli
Keyboard: organ	65	1969	Le Vitrail de St. Ouen	The stained glass of Saint-Ouen	about the stained glass of the church of Saint-Ouen Abbey in his hometown of Rouen
Keyboard: organ	65b	1965	Souvenir	Souvenir	to Josette Yon initially unpublished, manualiter. Last work of Dupré
