= Renet =

Renet may refer to:

- Renet Tilley, a character in the Teenage Mutant Ninja Turtles franchise

== People with the surname ==
- Françoise Renet (1924–1995), French classical organist
- Olivier Renet (born 1964), French chess player
