= Clarence Watters =

American organist, choirmaster and teacher

- Born: October 24, 1902; East Orange, New Jersey, U.S.
- Died: July 2, 1986 (aged 83); Hartford, Connecticut, U.S.
- Occupations: Organist; academic; composer
- Employer: Trinity College
- Known for: Proponent of French symphonic organ music

Clarence Everett Watters FAGO MMus (February 26, 1902 − July 26, 1986) was an American organist, choirmaster and teacher who specialized in the works of Johann Sebastian Bach as well as 19th and 20th century French composers such as Marcel Dupré, with whom he had studied in France. He directed the music department at Trinity College, Hartford, in Connecticut from 1932 to 1967 and was also a visiting professor of organ at Yale University.

== Early life and training ==
Born in East Orange, New Jersey, to Frank and Isabella Watters, he took piano lessons before learning the organ with the British-born organist Mark Andrews, who also taught Carl Weinrich. Watters became skilled in improvisation and memorization. He was awarded an associateship of the American Guild of Organists (AAGO) in 1919 and a fellowship (FAGO) in 1921, and was later given an honorary Master of Music degree from Trinity College, Hartford.

In 1926 Watters furthered his training with six months of lessons in France with his friend Marcel Dupré, whom he had first met in 1921 during the latter’s first North American tour. While in France he met Louis Vierne and Charles-Marie Widor and gave a private recital for the Dupré family on the Cavaillé-Coll organ in their home in Rouen. He was also a substitute organist at the American Church in Paris.

== Career ==
=== Church organist ===
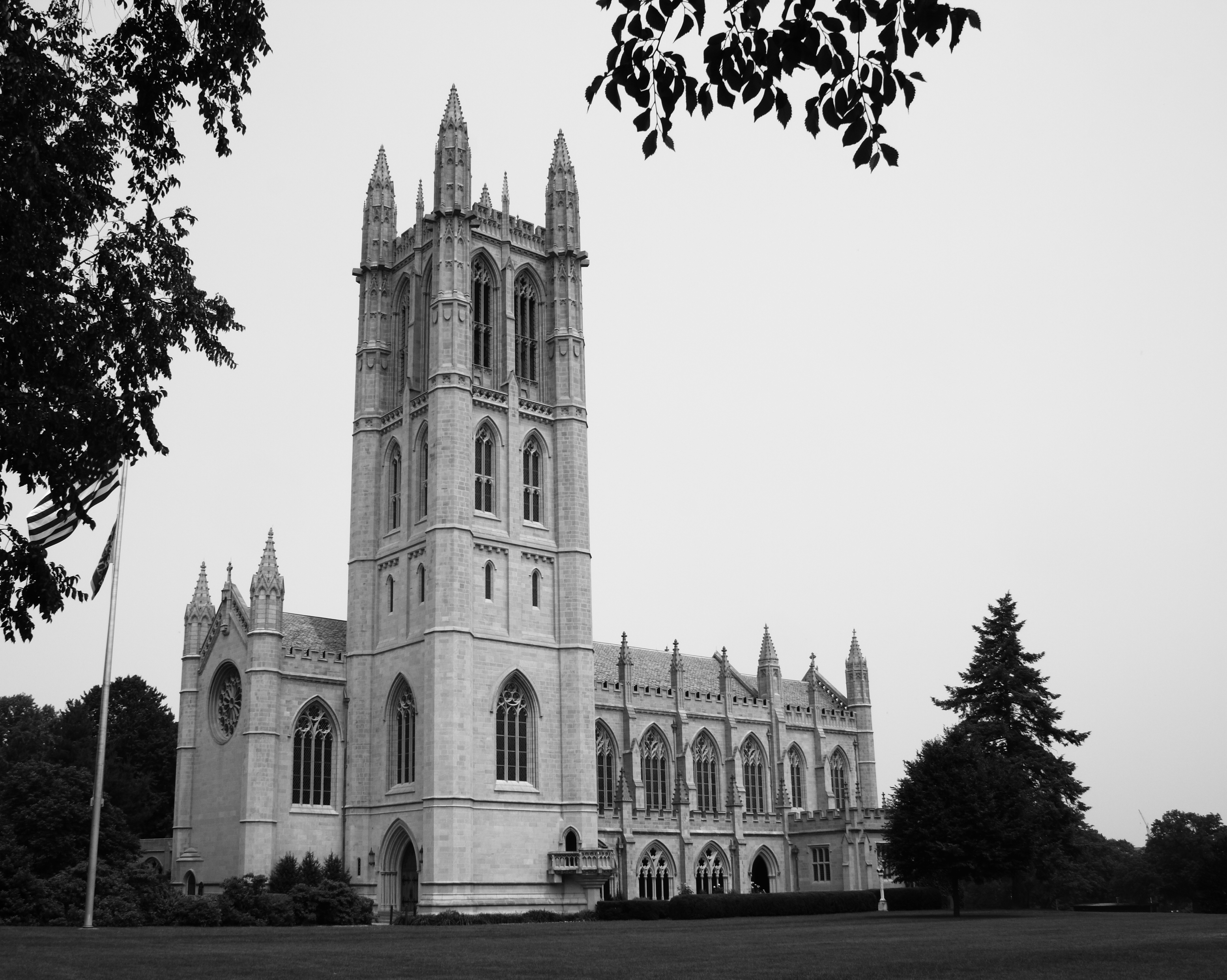
The chapel of Trinity College, Hartford, Connecticut, where Watters was organist and choirmaster from 1932 to 1967.

Watters was given his first position as a church organist at the age of 15, after stepping in for an absent accompanist during a rehearsal for Handel's Messiah at a church in Watsessing, New Jersey. He then became organist and choirmaster at the Church of the Redeemer in Paterson, New Jersey, in 1918; Park Church in Newark, New Jersey, in 1919; Christ's Church in Rye, New York, in 1922; the Church of the Ascension in Pittsburgh, Pennsylvania, in 1928; and St John’s Church in West Hartford, Connecticut, in 1929. Later he was the organist and choirmaster at the Center Church in Hartford, Connecticut, from 1945 to 1952 before returning to St John’s, West Hartford, from 1952 to 1976.

=== Teaching and other work ===
In 1932 Watters became head of the music department at Trinity College, Hartford, as well as the chapel organist. He was a leading authority on the works of Johann Sebastian Bach as well as 19th and 20th century French composers such as César Franck and Marcel Dupré. He was often the first organist to perform or record Dupré’s works in the United States − Le chemin de la croix, for example, was first performed at Trinity College chapel in 1933.

Following his retirement from Trinity in 1967, Watters served as a visiting professor of organ at Yale University in 1968 and 1970, where his papers are now held as part of the Irving S. Gilmore Music Library collection. Watters continued to give lessons and perform concerts in retirement, including at Notre-Dame de Paris cathedral in 1973 in honor of his late friend Dupré. He also served as a consultant for the installation of a new Austin organ in the Trinity College chapel in 1971.

He published articles in The American Organist and Diapason and began, though never completed, a biography of Dupré in the 1960s.

Trinity College continues to hold an annual memorial recital in honor of Watters.

== Personal life ==
Watters was married to Marjorie Florence Stanley (d. 1984), with whom he had one son and two daughters.

Watters died in West Hartford at the age of 84 and is buried at the Fairview Cemetery in the town.

== Compositions and recordings ==
Through primarily a concert organist and teacher, Watters did compose some music such as:

- Laudate Pueri (1934), for choir and organ
- Variations on Veni, Creator Spiritus (1962), for organ

His recordings include:

- César Franck: 3 Chorals (Classic Editions 1007)
- The Trinity College Chapel Organ: Music from the Inaugural Recital on the New Austin Organ (S & M Master Recordings 225)
- Clarence Watters: In Memoriam (AFKA SK-508)
