= Congregational Church (Montclair, New Jersey) =

Historic church in New Jersey, United States

- U.S. National Register of Historic Places
- New Jersey Register of Historic Places
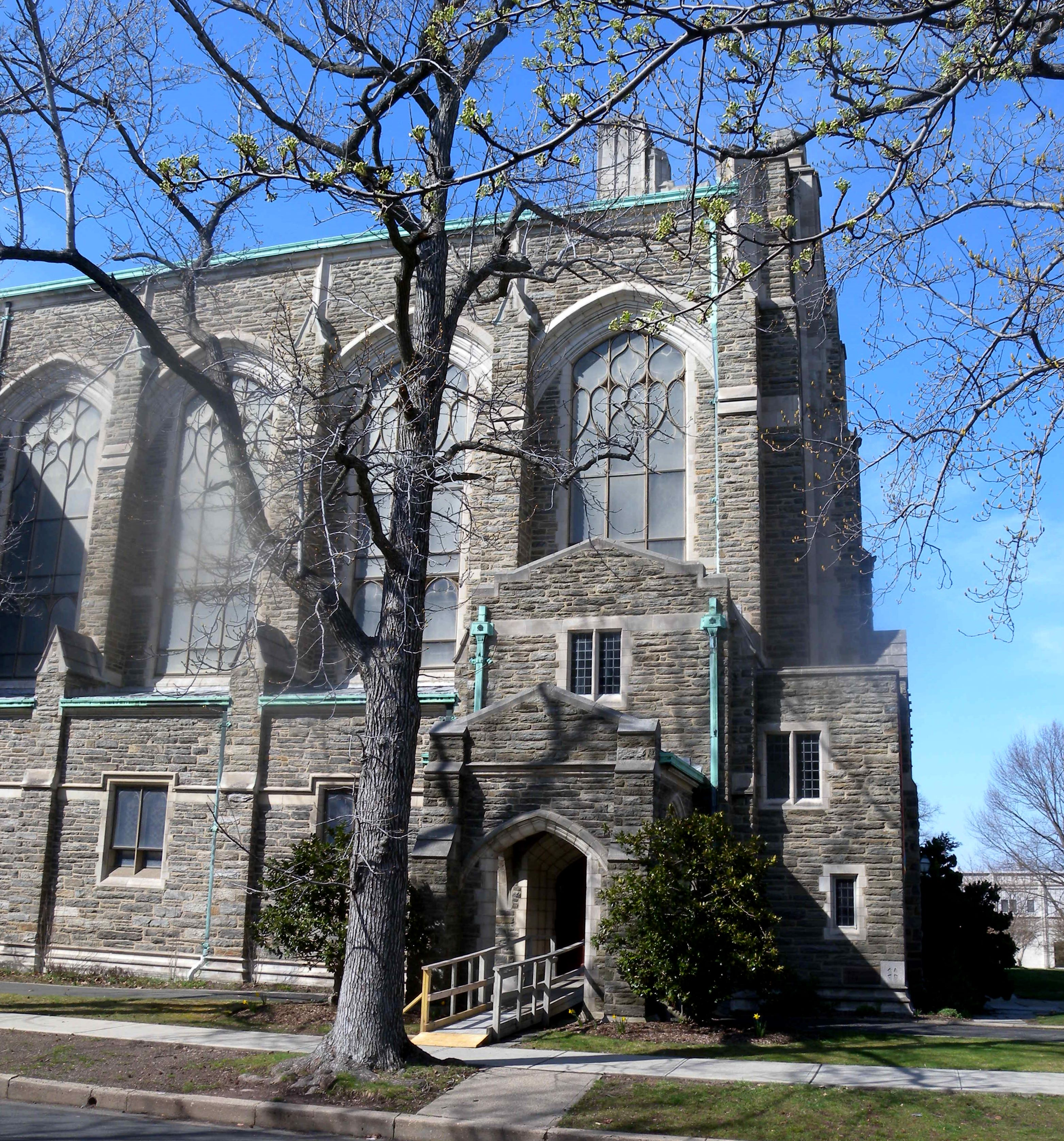

- Location within Essex County, New Jersey Location within New Jersey Location within the United States
- Location: 42 South Fullerton Avenue, Montclair, New Jersey
- Coordinates: 40°48′44″N 74°13′07″W
- Built: 1920
- Architect: Bertram Grosvenor Goodhue
- Architectural style: Late Gothic Revival; Perpendicular Gothic
- MPS: Montclair MRA
- NRHP reference No.: 86003050
- NJRHP No.: 1126

Significant dates
- Added to NRHP: July 1, 1988
- Designated NJRHP: September 29, 1986

The Congregational Church, also known as the First Congregational Church of Montclair, is a historic United Church of Christ church located at 42 South Fullerton Avenue in the township of Montclair in Essex County, New Jersey, United States. The church was designed by the architect Bertram Grosvenor Goodhue and features Perpendicular Gothic style. It was added to the National Register of Historic Places on July 1, 1988, for its significance in architecture. Eleanor Price notes in the nomination form that it is "one of the finest examples of Gothic church architecture in the country". It was listed in the Churches section of the Historic Resources of Montclair Multiple Property Submission (MPS).

The British-born organist Mark Andrews served as the church's organist from 1917 to 1939.

== See also ==
- National Register of Historic Places listings in Essex County, New Jersey
