= Three Preludes and Fugues, Op. 7 =

1914 composition by Marcel Dupré

Three Preludes and Fugues
- by Marcel Dupré
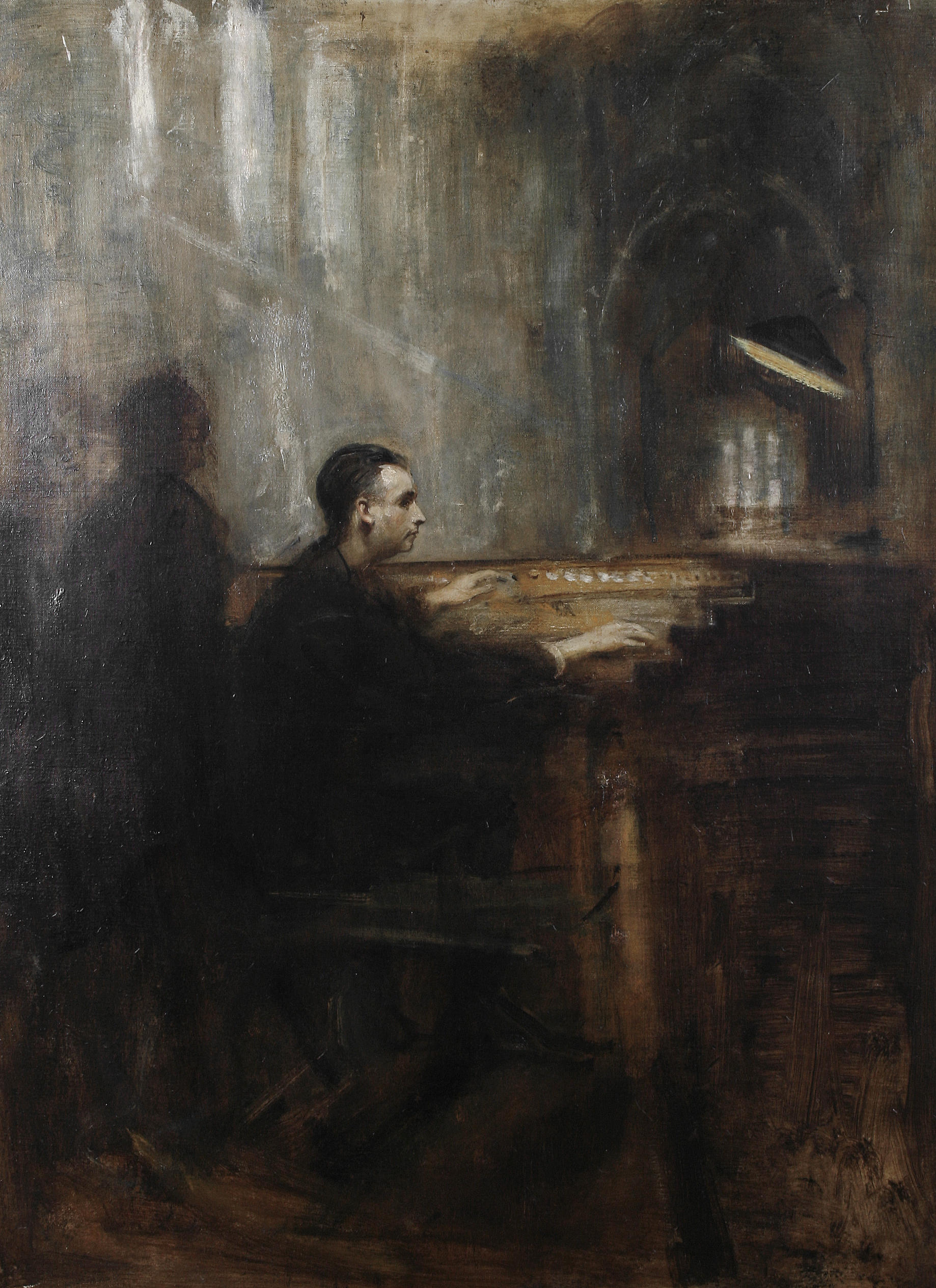
- Dupré at the grand organ of Notre-Dame de Paris, by Ambrose McEvoy
- Native name: Trois préludes et fugues
- Key: B major (No. 1); F minor (No. 2); G minor (No. 3)
- Opus: 7
- Year: 1914
- Duration: 23 minutes approx.
- Movements: 3
- Scoring: Organ

The Three Preludes and Fugues, Op. 7 (French: Trois préludes et fugues) is the first set of three preludes and fugues for organ by French composer Marcel Dupré.

== Background ==
The Three Preludes and Fugues is Dupré's second composition for solo organ. Written in 1914 (although some sources cite 1912 or 1911), the set was composed while Dupré was preparing for the examinations for the Grand Prix de Rome, in 1914. Marcel Lanquetuit, who would become the organist of Rouen Cathedral and was Dupré's first organ student, heard them played by the composer in 1911, and then Dupré also gave private performances for his friends in Rouen in or around 1912. The pieces were deemed to be too difficult to perform, so it was doubful they would be published, both by his friends in Rouen and several organists in Paris.

The pieces were dedicated to three different, recently deceased organists: René Vierne, a younger brother of Louis Vierne, who died for France in World War I (No. 1), Augustin Barié, a composer (No. 2), and Joseph Boulnois, a young composer who also died for France in World War I (No. 3). Dupré had a successful premiere at Salle Gaveau in 1917. He played them again after his Bach concerts in Paris in 1920, during his first visit to London, which led Alphonse Leduc to publish it later that year in Paris.

The third prelude and fugue, in G minor, went on to become more popular than the first two, as Dupré performed them many times as an encore in the course of his concert tours. Abbé Robert Delestre stated that the third prelude and fugue was played at a congress of organists with the support of the Royal College of Organists in London, which sparked a lot of interest. Dupré even recorded the third prelude and fugue in June 25 and October 27, 1926 in the Queen's Hall, in London.

== Structure ==
The set is divided into three movements. Each prelude and fugue forms a single continuous movement, as the fugue’s bar count continues directly from the preceding prelude. The movement list is as follows:

1. Prelude and Fugue No. 1 in B major. Animato – Un peu moins vite
2. Prelude and Fugue No. 2 in F minor. Cantabile – Moderato
3. Prelude and Fugue No. 3 in G minor. Vivace – Vif

=== Prelude and Fugue No. 1 in B major ===
The Prelude is a toccata in 3/4 time built on a prominent pedal theme. The opening section lasts for twenty-five bars. In bar 14, the pedal theme shifts to the manuals above a new bass line that anticipates the fugue subject. A short bridging section leads to the dominant of F♯ major. The process is repeated, this time in A♭ major. This works as a development, before the original key returns with an expanded version of the opening theme.

The Fugue is in common time and begins at a slightly slower tempo. It has a three-bar subject, divided by rests, which is a demanding section for both manuals and pedal. After the exposition is over, the first episode moves to E♭ major, which, later on, continues to modulate through many different keys, landing on G♯ minor for the development.

The recapitulation presents the subject again in B major combined with its augmentation, first in the bass and then in the soprano. A brief modulation to C major precedes a coda that continues the combination of subject and augmentation. The ending bars reuse the pedal solo that ended the prelude recall the pedal solo that ended the Prelude, and the work closes firmly in B major.

Because of the piece being consistently loud and fast, it requires careful control of articulation when playing it in buildings with poor acoustics.

=== Prelude and Fugue No. 2 in F minor ===
The second prelude and fugue contrasts sharply with the first: it is a lot quieter throughout, and imbued with a more melancholic tone. Unlike other works for organ of this Dupré period, the composer provides detailed registration indications for the organist. As in the case of No. 1, the fugue subject is also displayed in the prelude (in the right hand, in bar 2), though with a different rhythmic pattern from the one that appears in the fugue. In the prelude, the theme ascends over two octaves, supported by sustained staccato sixteenth notes in the left hand. The staccato sixteenth-notes later shift to the bass to accompany the theme in octaves. The prelude concludes with an inverted form of the theme.

The Fugue is in triple time. The subject is four bars long, and the countersubject begins with a descending scale derived from the last bar of the subject. The second segment is derived from the third bar of the subject. An extended entry in E minor introduces harmonies remote from the tonic. The movement ends with a descending sixteenth-note figure and a plagal cadence.

=== Prelude and Fugue No. 3 in G minor ===
Marked ppp in the score, the third prelude is a very fast scherzando piece. The manual features vivace rhythmic settings, while the pedal presents the melody in chorale-like phrases. The chorale is then transferred to the right hand and, finally, it returns to the pedal to conclude the prelude.

The fugue adopts a jig-like character, the complete opposito to the prelude. The exposition is in four voices, with the pedal entering last. After the exposition, the chorale theme from the prelude is restated on the pedal while the manuals continue the fugue. The piece ends with three final chords.

== Recordings ==
The following is a list of recordings of this composition:

Recordings of Three Preludes and Fugues, Op. 7
Organ	Date of recording	Place of recording	Label
Robert Noehren	1974	First Presbyterian Church, Trenton, New Jersey, USA	Delos
Janette Fishell	November 1996	St. George's Episcopal Church, Nashville, Tennessee, USA	Naxos
Gunther Rost	April 2010	Universität Würzburg, Würzburg, Germany	Oehms Classics
