= Mark Andrews (organist) =

British organist, composer and conductor

Mark Andrews, FAGO, ARCO (31 March 1875 − 10 December 1939), was a British organist, composer and conductor who spent most of his working life in the United States of America.

== Career ==
=== Organist ===
Born in Erith, Kent, Andrews studied the organ in England, having turned down a scholarship to the University of Cambridge following his father's death, before moving to Montclair, New Jersey, in 1902. He spent the rest of his life as organist of three churches in the town: St. Luke's Episcopal Church (1902−1912), the First Baptist Church (1912−1917) and the Congregational Church (1917−1939).

A fellow of the American Guild of Organists (for which he was also an examiner) and Associate of the Royal College of Organists, Andrews was also a member of St. Wilfrid Club in New York City. As a teacher, his pupils included Carl Weinrich, Clarence Watters, Julius Zingg, Edwin Stanley Seder and Winifred Young Cornish.

=== Composer and conductor ===
Andrews composed over 300 works for organ and voice, including sacred and secular music. He wrote the music for the glee club song John Peel, as well as for hymns such as To Whom Then Shall I Liken God. He conducted the Montclair Glee Club, the Mountain Lakes Glee Club, the Public Service Glee Club of Newark and the glee club of the University Club of New Haven, and in 1929 led 4,000 singers in a series of mass concerts of the Associated Glee Clubs of America held at Madison Square Gardens in New York City, at which several of his own compositions were performed.

== Family ==
Andrews was married to Minnie Foreman, with whom he had a son, Mark, and daughter, Audrey. Audrey was killed in a road accident in 1912, aged 9.

== Legacy ==
Andrews's papers were given to Montclair State Teachers College in 1945. Some of his recordings are available online.
