= Françoise Renet =

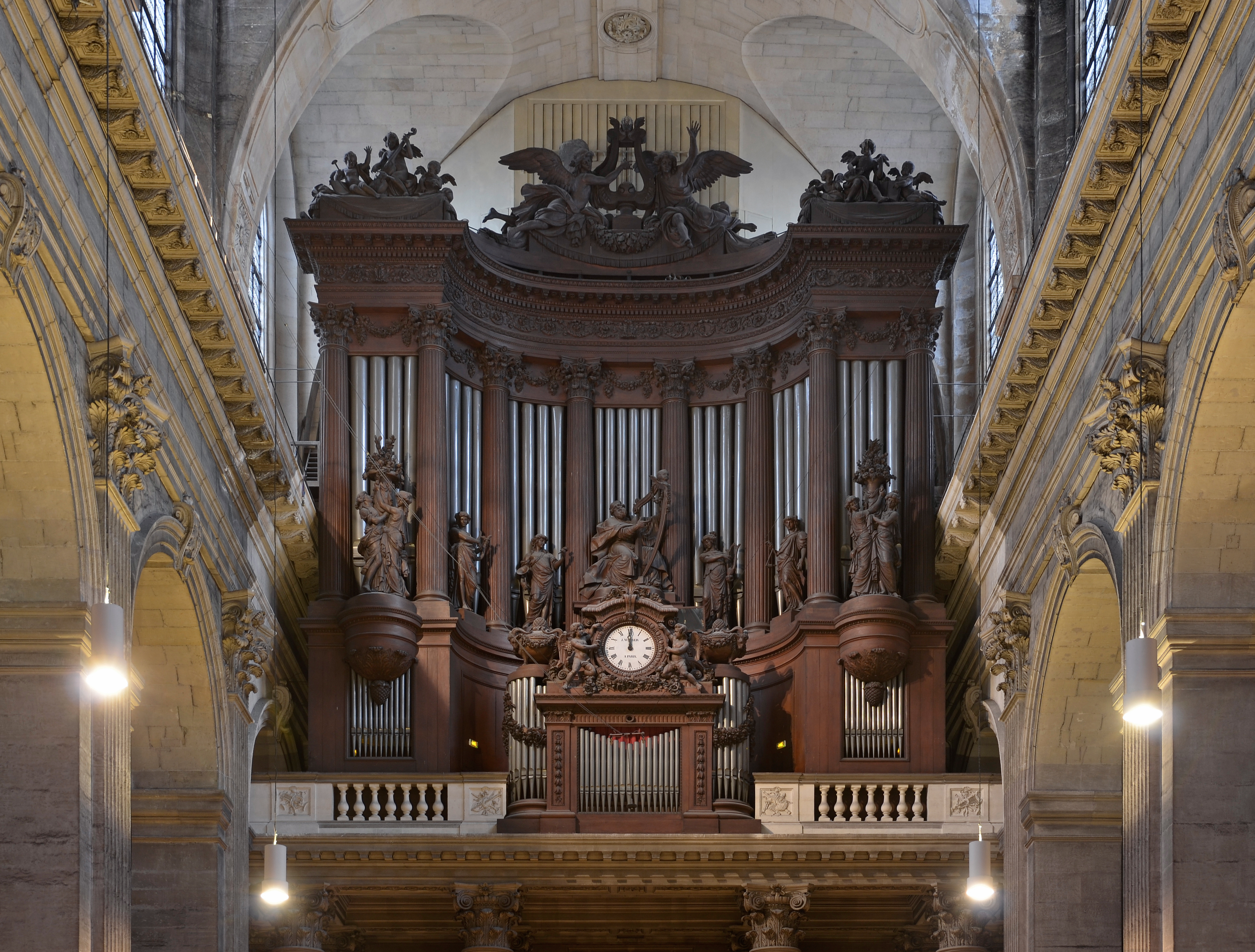
The celebrated Cavaillé-Coll organ at Saint-Sulpice (Paris).

Françoise Marie Blanche Renet (Paris May 20, 1924 Paris - Versailles March 23, 1995) was a French organist. She studied with Marcel Dupré (organ), Maurice Duruflé (improvisation), and Nadia Boulanger (harmony). For 30 years she was associated with the great Cavaillé-Coll at Saint-Sulpice (Paris): in 1955, she was named by Dupré Assistant Organist, maintaining the same position also with Dupré's successor Jean-Jacques Grunenwald. She was also Interim Organist during the Dupré/Grunenwald and Grunenwald/Roth interregna (1971-1973 and 1982–1985, respectively).

From 1972 to 1990, Renet taught the organ class at the Marcel Dupré Conservatory in Meudon.

== Discography ==
- Orgue Cavaillé-Coll de Saint-Sulpice, Paris (œuvres de Dupré et Grunenwald)
- Orgue particulier de Marcel Dupré, Meudon (œuvres de Titelouze et Dupré)
- Orgue Cavaillé-Coll de Saint-Sernin, Toulouse (Chemin de la Croix et Choral et Fugue de Dupré)
