= Carl Weinrich =

American organist, choral conductor, and teacher

Carl Weinrich (July 2, 1904 – May 13, 1991) was an American organist, choral conductor, and teacher. He was particularly known for his recitals and recordings of Bach's organ music and as a leader in the revival of Baroque organ music in the United States during the 1930s.

== Biography ==
Weinrich was born in Paterson, New Jersey, and began studying the organ when he was six years old. In addition to private study with Mark Andrews (who also taught Clarence Watters), Marcel Dupré, and Lynnwood Farnam, he received degrees from New York University in 1927 and the Curtis Institute of Music in 1930. Upon Farnam's death in 1930, Weinrich succeeded him as the organist at the Church of the Holy Communion in New York City. Weinrich was the organist, choirmaster, and Director of Music at Princeton University Chapel from 1943 to 1973. He also taught at Westminster Choir College, Wellesley College, Vassar College, and Columbia University, performed a recital series at Harvard University, and published a monograph on "Albert Schweitzer's Contribution to Organ-building". In 1955 he was the guest recitalist and lecturer at Northwestern University's annual church music conference. While working as an organist and conductor he studied singing in Philadelphia with Dorothy DiScala of the Academy of Vocal Arts.

Although primarily known for his performances of Baroque music, Weinrich also performed many 20th-century organ works, including the premieres of Samuel Barber's Prelude and Fugue in B Minor, Louis Vierne's Organ Symphony No. 6 in B minor, and Arnold Schoenberg's Variations on a Recitative (Op. 40). Carl Weinrich died in Princeton, New Jersey at the age of 86 after suffering from Parkinson's disease for several years. Amongst his students were the composer Betsy Jolas, the composer and organist George Lynn, and the musicologist and critic Joseph Kerman.

== Recordings ==
In 1951, Weinrich was signed by the MGM Records label to record a multi-volume series of LPs comprising all of Johann Sebastian Bach's organ compositions. While MGM did begin this series, recording Weinrich at Princeton Chapel in New Jersey, they only recorded and released a small sampling of Bach's organ works. However, several years later, Weinrich began the process of recording Bach's complete organ works for Westminster Records, this time on Vårfrukyrka church's organ in Skänninge, Sweden. The recordings completed in 1956 and were released over several years; they included most of Bach's published works for organ, including the major chorale collections and free works. Later LP volumes appeared on Westminster's successor label Music Guild/ABC.

A sampling of Weinrich's other recordings includes:

- Fantasia In Echo Style (Jan Pieterszoon Sweelinck), Musicraft, 1938
- Onward, Christian Soldiers and Other Beloved Hymns, RCA Victor, 1949
- Israel in Egypt (George Frideric Handel), Princeton University, 1956
- Bach Organ Music, RCA Victor, 1962
- Bach Organ Music, vol. 2, RCA Victor, 1963
- Romantic Organ Music, RCA Victor, 1964
- Funeral Anthem on the Death of Queen Caroline (George Frideric Handel), Princeton University, 1964
- Christmas Music of the Baroque (Dietrich Buxtehude, Johann Pachelbel, Fridolin Sicher, Arnolt Schlick, Louis Claude Daquin, Johann Sebastian Bach), RCA Victor, 1965
- Organ Music of the Bach Family (Carl Philipp Emanuel Bach, Johann Bernhard Bach, Johann Michael Bach, Johann Christoph Bach, Wilhelm Friedemann Bach, Johann Sebastian Bach), RCA Victor, 1965
- The Sonatas for Organ and Orchestra (Wolfgang Amadeus Mozart, Joseph Haydn), RCA Victor, 1967
- Mass in E minor (Anton Bruckner), Musical Heritage Society, 1974
- Concertos (George Frideric Handel, Felix Mendelssohn, Sergei Rachmaninoff, Joseph Haydn), Time–Life Records, 1980
