= Harold Friedell =

American organist

Harold Friedell (11 May 1905 – 17 February 1958) was an American organist. He was well known as a performer and educator, teaching at Juilliard and Union Seminary, a composer of a large number of choral anthems and solo organ pieces, and as a prominent leader in the American Guild of Organists.

== Life and career ==
Harold Friedell was born in Jamaica, Queens, New York. At age sixteen, he became the organist of First United Methodist Episcopal Church in Jamaica, Queens, while studying organ with Clement Gale and David McK. Williams. Seven years later, in 1927, he was appointed Organist at Calvary Church, New York, and he also worked at St. James the Less, Scarsdale training a boys and girls choir on weekdays and playing for Sunday afternoon services. In 1929, he earned the FAGO diploma from the American Guild of Organists, its highest designation, while he continued to study at Juilliard School under Bernard Wagenaar and Roger Sessions.

In 1931, Friedell was appointed Organist and Choirmaster at St. John's Church, Jersey City, New Jersey, and the next year, 1932, he married Muriel Healy on June 26 in the chapel of St. Bartholomew's Church. Unfortunately, Muriel died just six months later on December 29. Friedell later married, in 1934, Amy Valleau McGown in St. John's Church, and in that same year became the accompanist to the Downtown Glee Club and a regularly featured recitalist at Trinity Church.

Friedell returned to Calvary Church in 1939, this time as both Organist and Choirmaster, and by this time he had also earned the F.T.C.L. diploma, the highest certificate from Trinity College London in instrumental and vocal teaching. In 1945 Friedell was appointed to the faculty of Union Theological Seminary School of Sacred Music, initially teaching composition, and later, improvisation as well. The next year saw Friedell appointed as Organist and Master of the Choir to St. Bartholomew's Church, where his first marriage had been celebrated and with which he would be associated for the rest of his career. There was some controversy surrounding the appointment. It was announced as being interim, on the sudden resignation of David McK. Williams in October 1946. The stated reason published by the church was Dr. Williams’ hearing loss, which turned out to be a total fabrication. T. Scott Buhrman editorialized in the January 1947 issue of The American Organist magazine that,

"I consider Dr. Williams the world's greatest exponent of the beautiful and forceful in Episcopal music and it is not at all necessary to hear every other Episcopal church service in order to make such a statement. It's not necessary to be bitten by every rattlesnake in order to state without question that such an experience is painful...Will Dr. Williams return? I fervently hope so...And now, temporarily at least, the music of St. Bartholomew's drops back to ordinary excellence. Its super-excellence will never return in this generation unless Dr. Williams comes back."

— T. Scott Buhrman, The American Organist, January 1947

In that same year, Friedell resigned from his teaching duties at Juilliard and from his volunteer positions with the AGO, but he continued to teach at Union. In 1957, Friedell was awarded the honorary degree Doctor of Music from Missouri Valley College in Marshall, Missouri. He also represented the AGO at the First International Congress of Organists in London and did some further travel and concertizing in France.

Harold Friedell died on 17 February 1958, a Monday morning, of a heart attack while walking to the train station in Hastings-on-Hudson in heavy snow from a storm the previous evening. The funeral was held on 20 February at St. Bartholomew's Church, and Friedell was buried in Sleepy Hollow Cemetery, Tarrytown, New York.
