= Marcel Dupré =

French organist, composer and pedagogue (1886–1971)

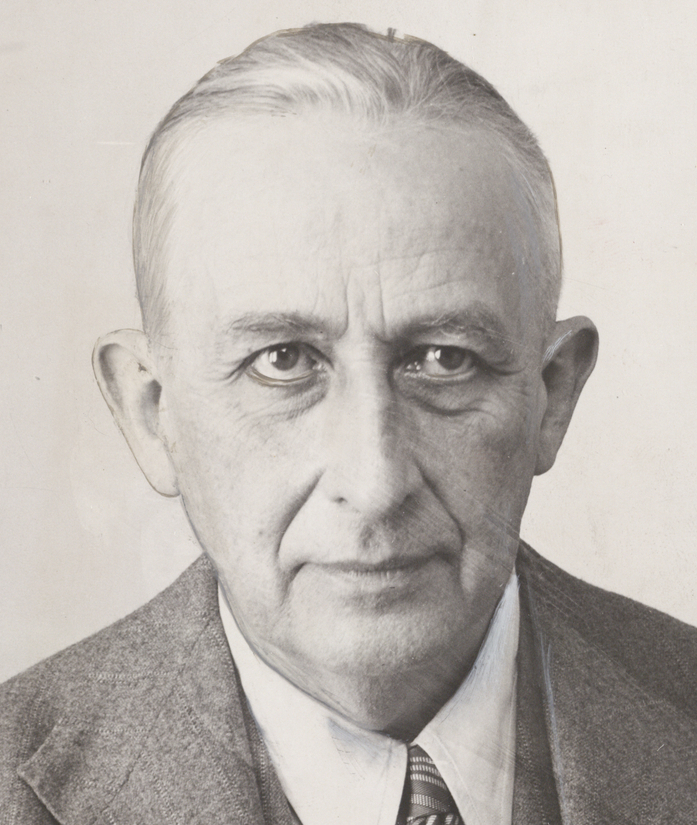
- Born: 3 May 1886; Rouen, France
- Died: 30 May 1971 (aged 85); Meudon, France
- Occupations: Composer; Organist; Academic teacher

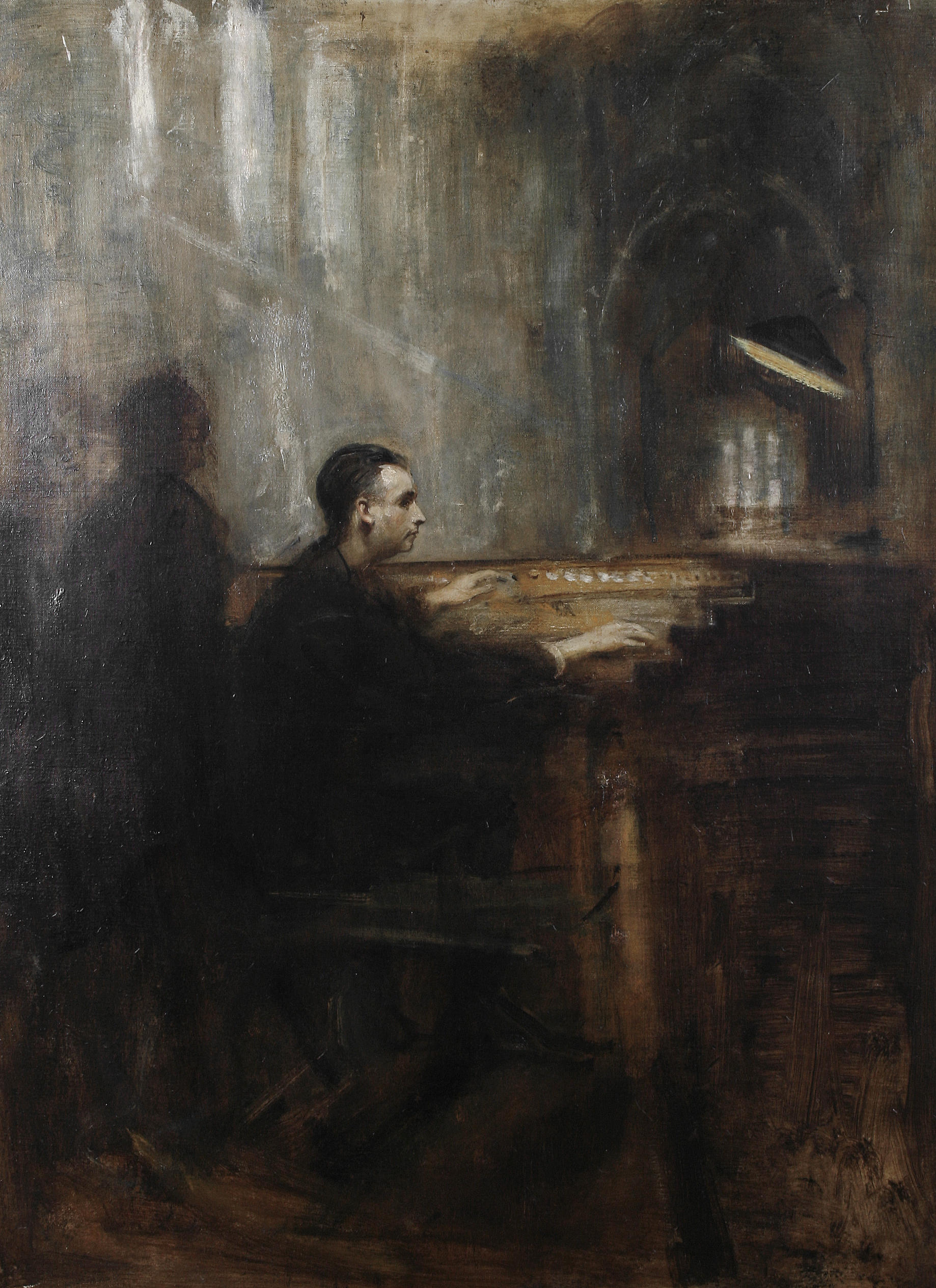
Dupré at the grand organ of Notre-Dame de Paris, by Ambrose McEvoy

Marcel Jean-Jules Dupré (French pronunciation: [maʁsɛl dypʁe]; 3 May 1886 – 30 May 1971) was a French organist, composer, and pedagogue.

== Early life and education ==
Born in Rouen into a wealthy musical family, Marcel Dupré was a child prodigy. His father Aimable Albert Dupré was titular organist of Saint-Ouen Abbey from 1911 till his death and a friend of Aristide Cavaillé-Coll, who built an organ in the family house when Marcel was 10 years old. His mother Marie-Alice (née Chauvière) was a cellist who also gave music lessons, and his paternal uncle Henri Auguste Dupré was a violinist and violist. Both of his grandfathers, Étienne-Pierre Chauvière (maître de chapelle at Saint-Patrice in Rouen and an operatic bass) and Aimable Auguste-Pompée Dupré (also a friend of Cavaillé-Coll) were also organists.

Having already taken lessons from Alexandre Guilmant (due to his appealing to his father), Dupre entered the Paris Conservatoire in 1904, where he studied with Louis Diémer and Lazare Lévy (piano), Guilmant and Louis Vierne (organ), and Charles-Marie Widor (fugue and composition). In 1914, Dupré won the Grand Prix de Rome for his cantata Psyché.

== Performances ==
Dupré became famous for performing more than 2,000 organ recitals throughout Australia, the United States, Canada and Europe, which included a recital series of 10 concerts of the complete works of J. S. Bach in 1920 (Paris Conservatoire) and 1921 (Palais du Trocadéro), both performed entirely from memory. The sponsorship of an American transcontinental tour by the John Wanamaker Department Store interests rocketed his name into international prominence. Dupré's "Symphonie-Passion" began as an improvisation on Philadelphia's Wanamaker Organ.

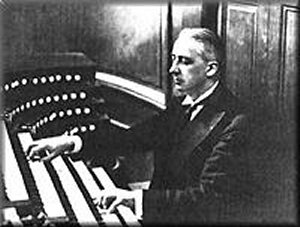
Dupré at the Saint-Sulpice organ console

Succeeding Widor in 1934 as titular organist at St. Sulpice in Paris, Dupré retained this position for the rest of his life; thus it happened that, since Widor had been there for more than six decades, the position changed hands only once in a century. In 1937, he was engaged to perform at the wedding of the Duke of Windsor and Wallis Simpson. The same year, Widor died.

== Teaching ==
In 1926, he was appointed professor of organ performance and improvisation at the Paris Conservatoire, a position he held until 1954. From 1947 to 1954, Dupré was director of the American Conservatory, which occupies the Louis XV wing of the Château de Fontainebleau near Paris. In 1954, after the death of Claude Delvincourt in a traffic accident, Dupré became director of the Paris Conservatoire; he held this post for only two years before the prevailing national laws forced him to retire at the age of 70.

He taught two generations of well-known organists such as Jehan Alain and Marie-Claire Alain, Jean-Marie Beaudet, Pierre Cochereau, Françoise Renet, Jeanne Demessieux, Rolande Ginabat-Falcinelli, Jean-Jacques Grunenwald, Odile Pierre, Jean Guillou, Jean Langlais, Carl Weinrich, Clarence Watters and, most famously, Olivier Messiaen, to name only a few.

He prepared study editions of the organ works of Bach, Handel, Mozart, Liszt, Mendelssohn, Schumann, César Franck, and Alexander Glazunov. He also wrote a method for organ (1927), two treatises on organ improvisation (1926 and 1937), and books on harmonic analysis (1936), counterpoint (1938), fugue (1938), and accompaniment of Gregorian chant (1937), in addition to essays on organ building, acoustics, and philosophy of music.

== Composing ==
As a composer, he produced a wide-ranging oeuvre of 65 opus numbers (+1 "bis"). Aside from a few fine works for aspiring organists (such as the 79 Chorales op. 28) most of Dupré's music for the organ ranges from moderately to extremely difficult, and some of it makes almost impossible technical demands on the performer (e.g., Évocation op. 37, Suite, op. 39, Deux Esquisses op. 41, Vision op. 44).

Dupré's most often heard and recorded compositions tend to be from the earlier part of his career. During this time he wrote the Three Preludes and Fugues, Op. 7 (1912), with the First and Third Preludes (in particular the G minor with its phenomenally fast tempo and its pedal chords) being pronounced unplayable by no less a figure than Widor. Such, indeed, is these preludes' level of complexity that Dupré was the only organist able to play them in public for years.

In many ways Dupré may be viewed as a Paganini of the organ. Being a virtuoso of the highest order, he contributed extensively to the development of technique (both in his organ music and in his pedagogical works) although, like Paganini, his music is largely unknown to musicians other than those who play the instrument for which the music was written. A fair and objective critique of his output should take into account the fact that, occasionally, the emphasis on virtuosity and technique can be detrimental to the musical content and substance. Nevertheless, his more successful works combine this virtuosity with a high degree of musical integrity, qualities found in compositions such as the Symphonie-Passion, the Chemin de la Croix, the Preludes and Fugues, the Esquisses and Évocation, and the Cortège et Litanie.

As an improviser, Dupré excelled as perhaps no other did during the 20th century, and he was able to take given themes and spontaneously weave whole symphonies around them, often with elaborate contrapuntal devices including fugues. The achievement of these feats was partially due to his native genius and partially due to his extremely hard work doing paper exercises when he was not busy practising or composing.

Although his emphasis as composer was the organ, Dupré's compositions also includes works for piano, orchestra and choir, as well as chamber music, and a number of transcriptions.

== Death and legacy ==
Dupré died after suffering cardiac arrest in 1971 in Meudon (near Paris) at the age of 85, on Pentecost Sunday; playing for two services shortly beforehand. His wife, Jeanne-Claire Marguerite Dupré-Pascouau (his nickname for her was 'Jeannette') lived until 1978. She donated all of her husband's musical manuscripts to the Bibliothèque nationale de France. His daughter Marguerite (later Dupré-Tollet) was a concert pianist (a pupil of Nikolai Medtner), and to a lesser extent, an organist.

The Association des amis de l'art de Marcel Dupré was founded in 1970 with the composer's own consent to help promote his work. They own his former house in Meudon.

== Compositions ==
See List of compositions by Marcel Dupré.

Preceded by Charles-Marie Widor	Titular Organist, Saint Sulpice Paris; 1934–1971	Succeeded by Jean-Jacques Grunenwald
