= St. Bartholomew's Episcopal Church (Manhattan) =

Church in New York City

St. Bartholomew's Church
- St. Bartholomew's Episcopal Church
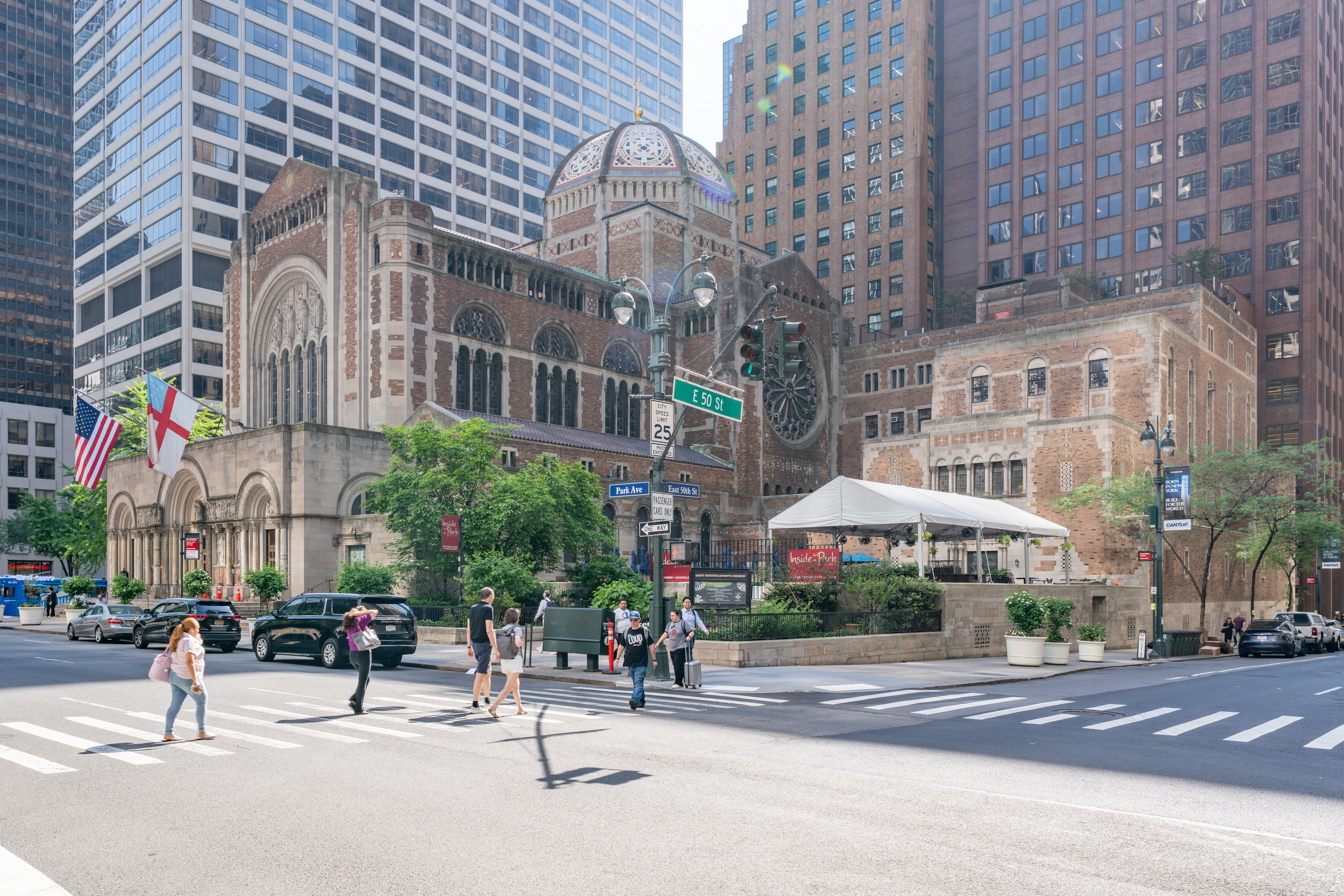
- St. Bartholomew's Church
- Location: 325 Park Avenue; Manhattan, New York, US
- Country: United States
- Denomination: Episcopal Church
- Website: stbarts.org/stbarts.org

History
- Founded: 1835; 191 years ago
- Dedication: St. Bartholomew
- Consecrated: May 1, 1923

Architecture
- Architect: Bertram Goodhue
- Architectural type: Church
- Style: Romanesque Revival, Byzantine Revival
- Completed: 1930
- Construction cost: $3 million (Note: Equivalent to $46.0 million in 2025)

Administration
- Province: Province II
- Diocese: New York

Clergy
- Bishop: Matthew Heyd
- Vicar: Peter Thompson
- St. Bartholomew's Church and Community House
- U.S. National Register of Historic Places
- U.S. National Historic Landmark
- New York State Register of Historic Places
- New York City Landmark
- Location within Manhattan Location within New York City Location within New York Location within the United States
- Location: 109 E. 50th St. Manhattan, New York, US
- Coordinates: 40°45′26″N 73°58′25″W
- Area: 1 acre (0.40 ha)
- Built: 1903
- Architect: Bertram Goodhue
- Architectural style: Romanesque Revival, Byzantine Revival
- NRHP reference No.: 80002719
- NYSRHP No.: 06101.000091
- NYCL No.: 0275

Significant dates
- Added to NRHP: April 16, 1980
- Designated NHL: October 31, 2016
- Designated NYSRHP: June 23, 1980
- Designated NYCL: March 16, 1967

St. Bartholomew's Church, commonly called St. Bart's, is a historic Episcopal parish in Midtown Manhattan, New York City, United States. Founded in January 1835, it occupied two buildings in Manhattan before opening its current building complex at 325 Park Avenue in 1918. The Park Avenue complex, designed in the Byzantine Revival style, consists of a main church by Bertram Goodhue and an adjacent community house by Mayers, Murray and Philips. The complex is designated a National Historic Landmark and a New York City designated landmark.

The parish's congregation occupied its first building at Great Jones Street and Lafayette Place in June 1835. With the relocation of Manhattan's population uptown, the congregation moved to Madison Avenue and 44th Street in 1878, occupying a structure designed by James Renwick Jr.. The Madison Avenue structure was deteriorating by 1914, prompting the acquisition of the third and current site on Park Avenue. Work began on May 1, 1917, and Bishop David H. Greer opened the new building on October 20, 1918. Due to funding shortfalls, work on various architectural elements continued through 1930. The building underwent minor changes through the 1970s, even as nearby apartment buildings on Park Avenue were replaced with offices. During the 1980s, the parish put forth several proposals to redevelop parts of the site with an office tower, prompting extended disputes between historic preservationists and real-estate developers. Following the failure of the office tower proposal, the church complex was gradually restored starting in the 1990s.

The church building has a cruciform arrangement and is aligned with the west–east axis of Manhattan's street grid. The facade is made of marble and brick, tinted in salmon and gray tones, and has cast stone decorations. The western elevation on Park Avenue contains a portico with three arches, while the upper section of the facade has large arched and rose windows. The interior consists of a narthex and a nave, which extend eastward to a circular apse. The crossing, where transepts extend off the nave, is topped by a dome. The five-story community house uses similar materials to the main building. The parish has a variety of programs, such as a music program and social services. Numerous figures, such as actress Lillian Gish, have had their funerals there.

== Early history ==
=== First building ===
The parish was organized on January 19, 1835, as one of 25 in the Episcopal Diocese of New York. Charles Vernon Kelly, originally of the Diocese of Ohio, was the first rector to preside over services; he was one of seven to serve the parish's congregation in its first 100 years. The parish's vestry acquired a 78-by-120-foot (24 by 37 m) parcel at Great Jones Street and Lafayette Place in what is now NoHo, Manhattan, the same month and began constructing its first building there that June. The site was located in what was then one of the city's most fashionable areas. The first building, a neoclassical structure with a finial above it, was plainly styled, like most churches of the time. The congregation moved into the first building's basement in June 1836. The structure was completed that October, at which point the congregation had 73 members. Initially, the parish held two public services every Sunday, and there was a Sunday school in the basement. During services, music was led by a precentor with two assistants, as was the custom for churches of the day. The parish sold pews to congregants.

The structure had not been fully paid for when it was built, and by 1837, the parish owed $25,000 on the land (held by the parish of Trinity Church) and $20,000 on the building's mortgage loan. (Note: Equivalent to $0.7 million on the land and $0.6 million on the loan in 2025) Amid financial turmoil that arose during the Panic of 1837, Kelly resigned as rector in 1838 and was succeeded by Lewis P. W. Balch. When Balch took over, the congregation had only 56 members; by 1844, this had grown to 409 members. Under Balch's rectorship, a new girls' school was established, and the structure was enlarged in 1842 to accommodate the growing congregation. Although many of the early congregants were among the city's wealthiest, this wealth did not translate to the parish, which remained in debt in the 1840s despite continual fundraising drives.

Balch resigned in 1850; his successor, Samuel Cooke, served as rector for several decades. During Cooke's rectorship, he oversaw a Sunday school, two Sunday services, and a Wednesday evening service. Debt continued to be an issue for the parish, which could not raise sufficient money through pew sales and rentals. The church building was renovated in 1859 with the addition of two entrances and redecoration of the interiors. Throughout this period, the center of Manhattan's population gravitated uptown. By 1870, the parish owed $40,000 and anticipated that a new building would cost $400,000, (Note: Equivalent to $0.9 million in debt and $9.0 million for a new building in 2025) but it could not afford either option. Nonetheless, the parish negotiated to acquire the existing Christ Church uptown, at Fifth Avenue and 35th Street.

=== Second building ===
==== 1870s: Development ====
Alva Erskine Smith, the wife of businessman William Kissam Vanderbilt, acquired a new site for the parish in 1871, paying the New York and Harlem Railroad $150,000. (Note: Equivalent to $3.6 million in 2025) The site, at the southwest corner of Madison Avenue and 44th Street, was then a largely residential area. After a brief search, the parish decided that October to hire James Renwick, who went on to design St. Patrick's Cathedral. To fund the project, the parish issued $68,000 (Note: Equivalent to $1.6 million in 2025) in notes and sold the first building. The cornerstone of the second building was laid on October 2, 1871, and the structure was developed from 1872 to 1876; progress had advanced enough that the first service was held there on November 3, 1872. The church building ultimately cost $229,684 (excluding land) (Note: Equivalent to $6.7 million in 2025) (Note: A full cost breakdown is provided in Chorley 1935, pp. 117–118, which places the cost at $379,684 including land.) and was consecrated on February 21, 1878.

The structure was designed in the Lombardic style. It had a nave 103 feet (31 m) long, with vaulted ceilings measuring 60 feet (18 m) high, while the semicircular chancel at the end measured 18 feet (5.5 m) and were terminated by a tripartite stained glass window. The chancel was made of several types of marble, and there was a white altar atop the chancel. Both the nave and chancel were 43 feet (13 m) wide, and the nave also had side aisles, separated from the central aisle by arcades of granite columns. Stained glass clerestory windows above the aisles illuminated the nave.

==== 1880s to 1910s ====
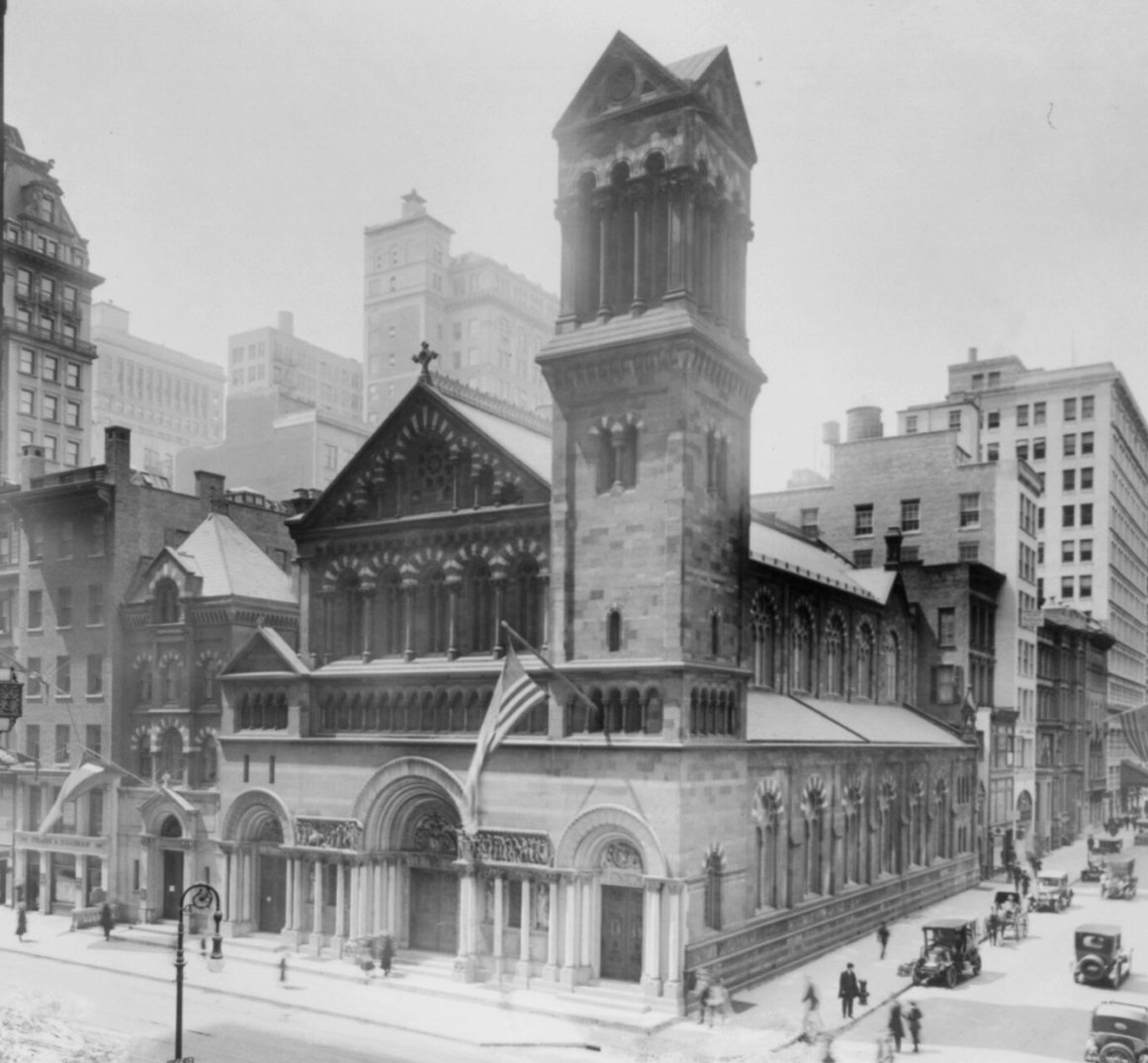
The church building at Madison Avenue and 44th Street, seen c. 1918

Cooke resigned as rector in 1888 and was succeeded by David Hummel Greer. Greer took an anti-elitist stance, establishing multilingual Sunday schools. Cornelius Vanderbilt, who was part of St. Bart's vestry, donated land in the early 1890s for a parish house, which was built for $335,143 (Note: Equivalent to $10.9 million in 2025) on 42nd Street. The parish had a Chinese guild, boys' and girls' clubs, an employment bureau, a loan society, and a hospital. Greer solicited funding for renovations from the congregation in 1893, obtaining raised $103,000 for the project. (Note: Equivalent to $3.3 million in 2025) A reredos made of Caen stone, depicting the Last Supper, was installed behind the altar, and an electric organ was also installed. The church building reopened that October.

Cornelius Vanderbilt died in 1899 and bequeathed $200,000 to the parish's vestry, (Note: Equivalent to $6.5 million in 2025) along with an equal amount for expanding the church building. By the early 1900s, the parish house had three clubs with hundreds of members. The parish house had Sunday schools for several groups of immigrants; a weekday school of 175 students; and various other groups such as a cadet battalion, choir, training schools, and tailor shop. Stanford White was hired in 1902 to design a French Romanesque Revival entrance portal with three arches, funded by the Vanderbilt family as a memorial to Cornelius.

When Greer was elevated to a bishop in 1904, he had to resign his post at St. Bart's; Leighton Parks thus became the congregation's fifth rector. Meanwhile, one of its vestrymen, Alfred Hoyt, had bequeathed land in Pawling, New York, in 1904; a chapel was built there in 1911. The Madison Avenue church building was further expanded in 1909 at a cost of $90,000, (Note: Equivalent to $2.3 million in 2025) and a chapel opened next to the church the next year. By 1914, the second church had been surrounded by high-rise development, and the church building itself had deteriorated severely. The foundations had settled, causing the floor to sag; the roof had to be replaced; and the building was in danger of collapsing entirely. Maintenance costs had reached $253,000 per year. (Note: Equivalent to $6.0 million in 2025) Theatrical figures and their children comprised many of the congregants, but attendees no longer lived within walking distance of the building, which had been redeveloped with commercial buildings.

== Operations on Park Avenue ==
In April 1914, Parks notified his congregation that the vestry had agreed to acquire a new site for the parish on Park Avenue between 50th and 51st Streets. The land was occupied by the Schaefer Brewery, one of Manhattan's largest breweries. St. Bartholomew's officers voted on June 8 to exercise their option for the brewery site, although the congregation would not be able to move there for 18 months. Two days after the vote, the parish took title to the site for $1.5 million. (Note: Equivalent to $35.6 million in 2025) To fund the new building's construction, the vestry wished to sell the old Madison Avenue building for $1.4 million (Note: Equivalent to $33.2 million in 2025) and resell the northern portion of the newly-acquired Park Avenue site for $500,000. (Note: Equivalent to $11.9 million in 2025)

=== Late 1910s: Development ===
==== Planning ====
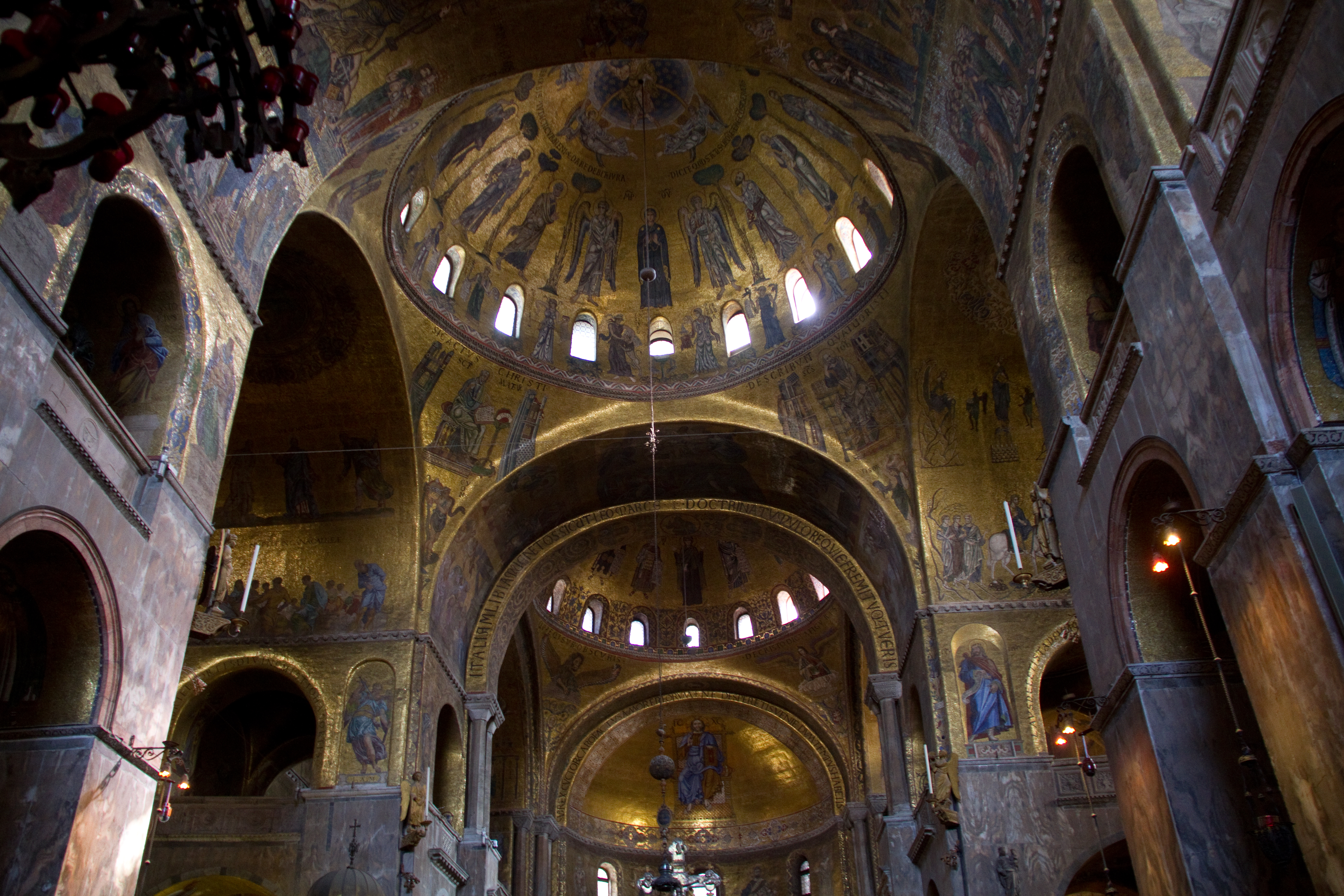
Goodhue modeled St. Bart's plan after St Mark's Basilica (pictured).

Parks wanted to attract commuters from the newly-opened Grand Central Terminal, as well as tourists, so he wanted the new building to fit 1,500 people. The rector and the vestry also wished to relocate Stanford White's portal to the second church, as the portal honored one of the most prominent congregants and had been completed a decade earlier. The parish created an art committee, headed by Alvin Krech, to select an architect for the building. Bertram Goodhue, who knew Krech through the Century Association, was hired in June 1914 to design the new building. He did not want to design the edifice in the Gothic style, as it was too expensive, but the vestry's members were skeptical about Goodhue's original plans for a Romanesque edifice. Goodhue ultimately modeled the building's plan after St Mark's Basilica, maximizing the number of pews in the crossing and transepts. Since the vestry was unsure whether the northern part of the site would be sold, Goodhue prepared two sets of plans: one for a structure occupying the whole site and one for a structure occupying half the lot. Members of the vestry also objected to the materials that Goodhue had proposed to use, such as the stone and brick masonry on the facade and the tilework for the crossing.

The original plans called for an almost square layout, with the nave being only slightly longer than the transepts. The vestry rejected Goodhue's original drawings in January 1915, but it approved a modified plan later that month. Goodhue told them the edifice could be built for $500,000, (Note: Equivalent to $11.5 million in 2025) even though the architect himself believed that the building would cost $600,000 to $700,000. (Note: Equivalent to $13.8–16.1 million in 2025) Nonetheless, Parks appointed a building committee in March 1915 to oversee the building's financing. During this time, Goodhue and the parish's art committee continued to disagree over what materials to use, even as Goodhue had begun hiring engineers and creating drawings for the site. The vestry considered selling the northern portion of the site to the Racquet and Tennis Club, but, in June 1915, Goodhue decided to lengthen the nave to provide additional seating capacity. This necessitated relocating the proposed church to the northern part of the lot and increased the cost by $100,000. (Note: Equivalent to $2.3 million in 2025) The vestry ordered a scale model of the new building.

Congregants viewed a scale model of the building in January 1916. The same month, St. Bartholomew's vestry modified the plans; instead of the building occupying the whole Park Avenue frontage, it would share the site with a 75-foot-wide (23 m) apartment house. The vestry was still undecided about whether to use the whole site. In February 1916, the parish's building committee presented three proposals for the site. Scheme A occupied the southern part of the site, scheme B occupied the northern part, and scheme C occupied the whole width of the block. Even though scheme B was the most expensive of the three proposals (costing $1.2 million), (Note: Equivalent to $24.5 million in 2025) the vestry chose scheme B because it would provide 1,500 seats (including 225 in folding chairs), while scheme A only provided 1,300 seats.

==== Construction ====
Fundraising for the new church began in 1916.

Congregants began raising money for the new building in early 1916. If the congregants did not raise $1 million by that December, (Note: Equivalent to $20.4 million in 2025) the project would be canceled; Parks said he would resign if the congregation donated insufficient funds. Congregants made donations ranging from 50 cents to $25,000, and the family of Charles W. Harkness alone provided $500,000. Around the same time, Parks accused Goodhue of inflating the project's construction cost to $684,700; (Note: Equivalent to $14.0 million in 2025) this dispute created distrust between the vestry and Goodhue. The vestry approved a modified plan for the new building in June 1916. It decided the following month to construct the building but not its chapel, as construction costs had risen significantly. By the end of the year, the parish had hired Cyrus L. W. Eidlitz to downsize the building to save money. Eidlitz eliminated the cloister and the tower above the building's crossing; replaced various materials with cheaper alternatives; and decreased the building's height by 4 feet (1.2 m). By January 1917, the congregation had raised $1 million, prompting Bishop David H. Greer to announce that work on the new building would begin immediately.

The vestry awarded numerous construction contracts and began laying the building's foundation in early 1917, although unexpected difficulties increased the foundation's cost by $11,000. (Note: Equivalent to $224,000 in 2025) Greer laid the cornerstone on May 1, 1917, at which point the building was projected to cost at least $3 million. (Note: Equivalent to $49.6 million in 2025) Greer predicted the third church would "last at least longer than former ones have done". The building had been planned with a dome, but the dome's construction was deferred in 1917 due to high material and labor costs. The building's steel frame was erected rapidly, and the roof had been installed by July 1917, but the decorations still had to be installed over the next year. Construction costs had reached $1.27 million by September 1917, and officials anticipated that they would spend another $1 million on the project. (Note: The amount already spent is equivalent to $21.0 million, and the additional expenditure equivalent to $16.5 million, in 2025)

By January 1918, the vestry had decided not to construct the garden or install ornamental tiles. To further save money, contractors salvaged some materials from the Madison Avenue building, including the marble paving, stained-glass windows, chancel rail, choir stalls, a painting above the second building's altar, and a reredos. The last service at the old building took place on April 28, 1918, and the building closed on May 20. Greer officially opened the new building on October 20, 1918. After the third building on Park Avenue was completed, the New York Supreme Court approved the sale of the old building in July 1919. At the time of the building's opening, the northern facade, acoustic tiles, marble revetment, and crossing remained incomplete; the crossing had a temporary roof. The garden was being landscaped by December 1918, and Parks solicited donations from his congregants to fund the building's completion. Nonetheless, the parish's treasurer reported in late 1919 that there was only $47,000 remaining in the building fund. (Note: Equivalent to $0.7 million in 2025)

==== Early and mid-1920s: Further work, community house ====
Although Goodhue urged the building committee to expand the structure in 1922, church officials could not expand the building until the parish's debt had been paid off. To raise money, the parish sold off several of its old buildings, raising $1 million. (Note: Equivalent to $15.1 million in 2025) St. Bartholomew's vestry also announced in 1922 that it would acquire every pew that had been sold to congregants. The vestry had sold many of its pews in the late 19th century, as it was common for congregants to bequeath pews to their children; with fewer descendants attending, approximately 61 pews were being rented out by the 1920s. The vestry had repurchased all pews by April 1923, and the vestry began renting out pews and selling memorial tablets to increase the parish's $500,000 endowment. (Note: Equivalent to $7.3 million in 2025) By then, the parish's debt had decreased to $155,000; (Note: Equivalent to $2.3 million in 2025) after the debt was paid off, Parks consecrated the building on May 1, 1923. The next year, Parks announced that the parish's loan association and benefit society, both of which had operated for nearly three decades, would stop operating because the vast majority of the 3,716 congregants did not need these organization's services.

The southern part of the new site was still unoccupied, so Parks proposed constructing a parish house and rectory there. Toward the end of his tenure, in 1924, Parks proposed ascribing the congregation to a modernist doctrine; this was controversial and led to the Vanderbilt family leaving the congregation. Parks resigned as St. Bartholomew's rector in early 1925, and Robert W. Norwood was selected as the congregation's sixth rector shortly thereafter. Norwood, a devout Protestant, frequently stated that he was "free for discussion of timely events"; many of his services incorporated text from the Bible, as well as mentions of current events. Norwood had wanted to complete the church building's dome, but congregants convinced him to first build a community house. Under Norwood's leadership, the plans for the parish house and rectory were changed to those for a community house and garden. The Brewster family also donated a pulpit in 1925.

The vestry was considering plans for the community house by January 1926. Goodhue had died the previous year, so the vestry hired his firm, Bertram Grosvenor Goodhue Associates, that April to design a $575,000 community house. (Note: Equivalent to $8.4 million in 2025) Congregants raised money for the construction of the community house, supplanting the old parish house, which had been made obsolete by changing development patterns in East Midtown. The sale of the old parish house netted $1.6 million, (Note: Equivalent to $23.3 million in 2025) nearly all of which was used to furnish the community house. Work began in June 1926, after the Cauldwell-Wingate Company was hired as the general contractor. Bishop William T. Manning dedicated the community house on November 29, 1927. Initially, only members were allowed to use the facility for $1 a month. Members did not need to be Episcopalians, but membership was capped at 600. The parish established a community theatre, the St. Bart's Players, in 1927 with funding from the Vanderbilt family.

==== Late 1920s: Dome and interior ====
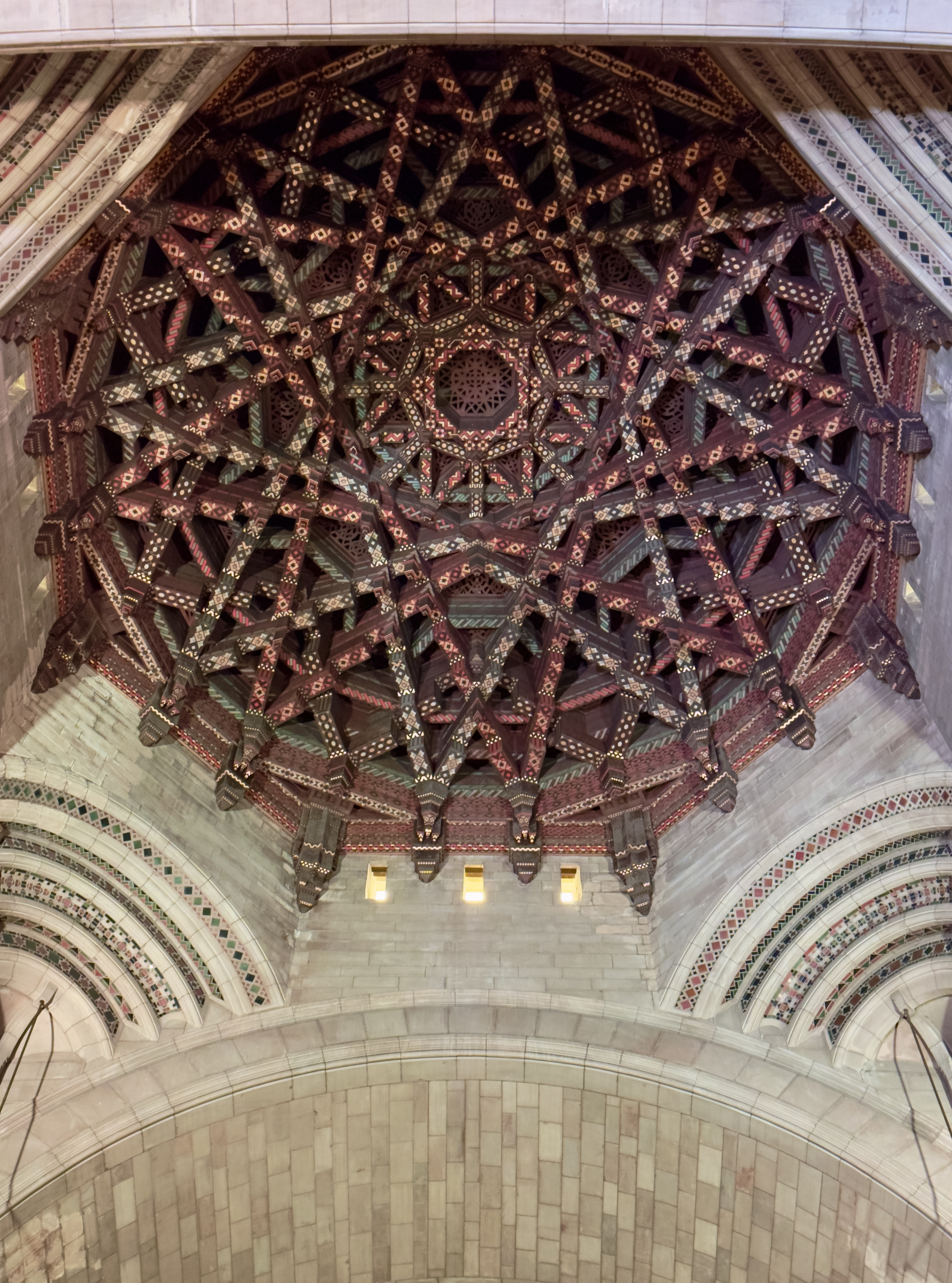
Fundraising for the dome was completed in 1929.

Meanwhile, Norwood wanted to furnish the church building's interior, which was largely bereft of decoration. There were bronze doors at the entrance to the chapel, and Lee Lawrie had carved a lectern and pulpit, but these had been donated to the parish as private memorials. Church officials asked Goodhue Associates to draw new sketches for the interior in February 1927. Krech, who still led the parish's art committee, decided to decorate the interior of the apse with Byzantine-style mosaics, even though the style clashed with Goodhue's original Romanesque design. Goodhue Associates and artist Hildreth Meière created preliminary design for the interior in October 1927 and exhibited a model of the apse in May 1928. Norwood sought to raise $700,000 (Note: Equivalent to $10.3 million in 2025) in total, and congregants had raised nearly $555,000 of this amount by April 1929. (Note: Equivalent to $8.2 million in 2025) Congregants donated $123,637 during Easter 1929 alone; (Note: Equivalent to $1.8 million in 2025) this amount was used to fund the construction of a marble revetment in Greer's honor. The mosaics in the apse were completed in October 1929.

The art committee started raising $700,000 for the dome and interior decorations in January 1929, (Note: Equivalent to $5.2 million in 2025) reaching their target by the end of that year. Church officials announced in January 1930 that they would complete both the dome and the mosaic tiles in the narthex. Mayers, Murray and Phillips filed plans for the dome in March 1930. The work also included replacing the tile floor with marble; adding acoustic tile to the walls of the nave, transepts, and chancel; adding stone cladding to the crossing's arches; and replacing temporary doors just inside the lobby. Church officials planned to install an organ in the dome, supplementing existing organs in the chancel and rear. Emily Vanderbilt White funded the installation of the organ, as well as the completion of the narthex. The dome was completed in September 1930, and the first service under the new dome was held on October 5, 1930. The main building had to be rededicated because it had undergone so many alterations, and Manning rededicated the building on December 9, 1930. The entire edifice had cost $3 million to construct, of which the dome had cost $750,000. (Note: Equivalent to $11.5 million in 2025)

=== Mid-20th century ===
==== 1930s to 1950s ====
Although St. Bartholomew's congregation remained largely upper-class, the parish was also impacted by the Great Depression in the United States. By February 1932, the parish was spending $1,000 per week on social-services programs, (Note: Equivalent to $24,000 in 2025) prompting it to reduce the salaries of staff members by 10 percent. Norwood died in September 1932, and George Paul Torrence Sargent was selected as the congregation's next rector that November; he formally assumed that position in February 1933. In spite of the Depression, the parish had paid off its entire construction debt by December 20, 1932. The parish celebrated its centennial in 1935, during which the congregants dedicated a bust of Norwood.

Sargent announced in 1942 that the family of Adelaide Sheldon had donated 14 stained-glass windows to St. Bart's, while Emily Vanderbilt White donated a stained-glass rose window for the south transept; Sheldon's family subsequently donated another eight windows. The firm of Reynolds, Francis & Rohnstock designed all of the stained-glass windows. White's window was dedicated in November 1943, while Sheldon's windows were dedicated in November of the following year. In addition, after All Hallows-by-the-Tower in London was damaged in the Blitz, a stone from that church was rededicated next to St. Bart's pulpit in 1943. A clerestory window was dedicated at the church building in 1949.

Sargent announced in January 1950 that he would resign as rector, and Anson Phelps Stokes succeeded Sargent that November. Two chancel screens, as well as a plaque honoring Sargent, were dedicated at St. Bart's in January 1954. Stokes served as rector for only four years, resigning in November 1954 to become the bishop coadjutor of the Episcopal Diocese of Massachusetts. He was succeeded by Terence J. Finlay, who was officially installed as the congregation's rector in October 1955. Following a donation from the William N. Cromwell Fund, an air-conditioning system was installed at St. Bart's, making it the completely air-conditioned Protestant church in New York City. The air-conditioning system was completed in July 1956.

==== 1960s and 1970s ====
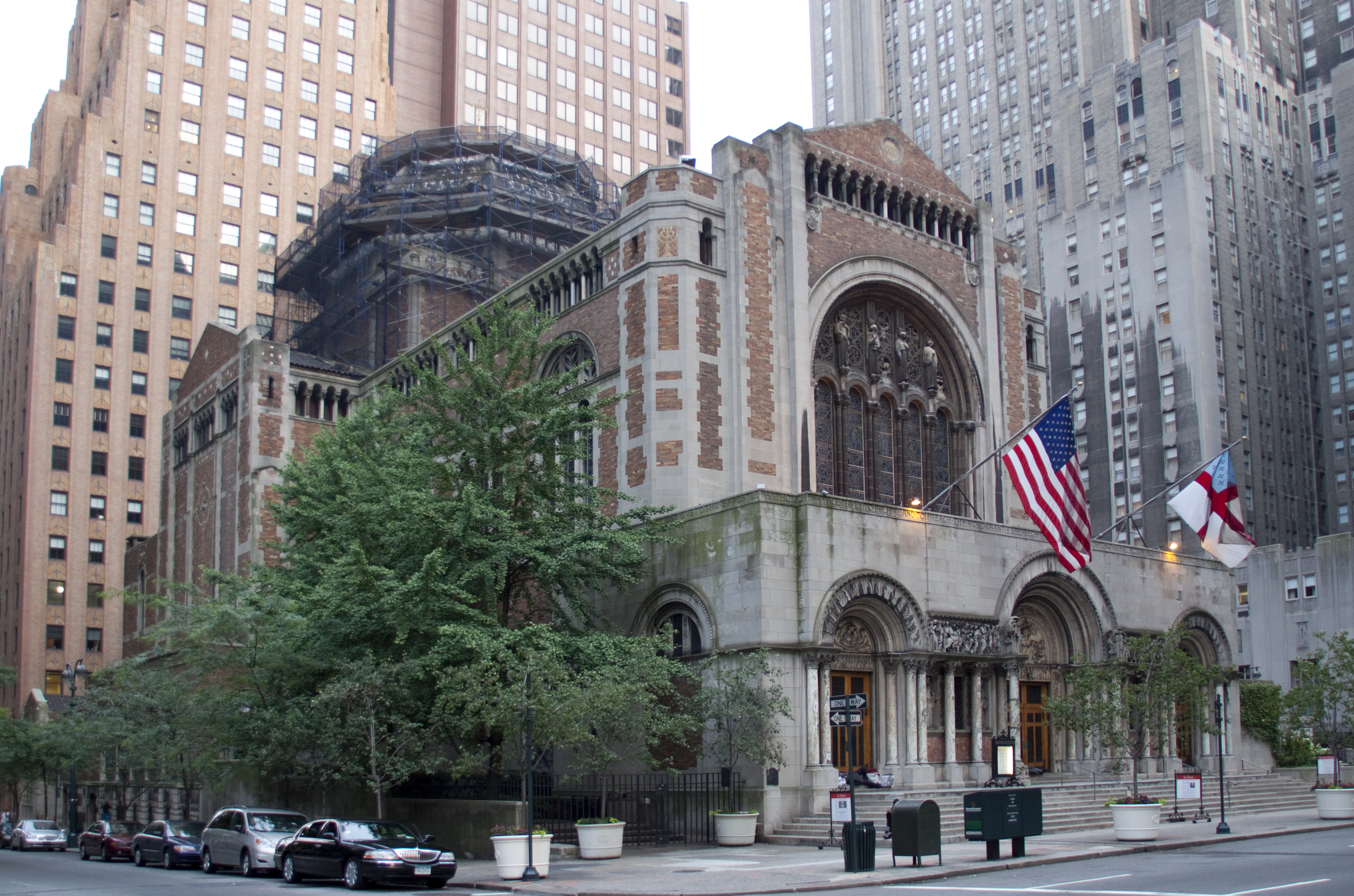
By the 1960s, many of the nearby apartment buildings on Park Avenue had been replaced with office buildings.

By the 1960s, many of the nearby apartment buildings on Park Avenue had been replaced with office buildings. St. Bart's was one of the few remaining structures on the midtown section of Park Avenue that was not replaced with office development. Many of the congregants who had lived in these apartment buildings relocated to the suburbs. St. Bart's finances had steadily declined as numerous affluent congregants had left. The remaining congregants planted two small gardens outside the building in 1964. The New York City Landmarks Preservation Commission (LPC) designated St. Bart's main building and community house as a New York City landmark in 1967. Parish officials, who initially did not support the designation, convinced the LPC to agree not to preclude future modifications to the structures.

Between 1977 and 1978, the parish repaired the dome. Thomas D. Bowers, the rector of St. Luke's Episcopal Church in Atlanta, was selected as St. Bart's rector in 1978. Bowers began using a prayer book mandated by the Episcopal General Convention; allowed laypeople to participate in liturgical readings; and ended the practice of charging congregants a fee to use the pews. He also wished to institute new social programs. Bowers's changes came as a surprise to many congregants, who were accustomed to low church services with low-profile rituals.

The parish was still active in 1980, with approximately 2,000 congregants, although it had lost more than a third of its congregants in the preceding three decades; the majority of the remaining congregants were over 50 years old and had been there for at least a decade. St. Bart's congregation was no longer rich, as was widely perceived, and the two Sunday services drew 520 people on average. An 1981 survey of the congregation found that about 75 percent of congregants were single and that most congregants were middle-class. St. Bart's $12 million endowment was no longer sufficient to fund its $2.6 million annual budget, as expenses had by then eclipsed income. The parish's deficits were expected to increase from $323,000 in 1981 to $1.8 million in 1986. The parish had briefly contemplated launching a $12 million capital campaign but decided that the campaign was infeasible.

=== 1980s: Proposed demolition ===
In the 1980s, a tower was proposed on the site.

The 1975 New York City fiscal crisis had largely subsided by 1980, prompting increased demand for offices in New York City. During that decade, a tower was proposed on the site, prompting a much-publicized dispute between historic preservationists and real-estate developers. Although the tower was ultimately not built, architect and writer Robert A. M. Stern said the dispute "engaged the public in crucial issues of aesthetics, real estate development, and constitutionality". The dispute was the subject of Brent C. Brolin's 1988 book The Battle of St. Bart's.

==== Original plan ====
In September 1980, news media reported that an unidentified company had offered to buy the St. Bart's site for $100 million and erect an office tower on part of the site. Unused air rights on the main building's site would be transferred to facilitate the construction of the office building on a smaller site. Bowers supported the tower's development, and the parish's treasurer said income from the tower would both pay for renovations and cover growing deficits. The planned sale quickly became controversial both within the congregation and among the general public, and there were false rumors that the main building itself could be demolished. Opponents said the parish could sustain itself on $300,000 in annual donations, and parish officials unanimously voted in October 1980 to reject the sale of the entire site. The vestry had to approve the sale, so the dispute also affected the parish's 1980 vestry elections; (Note: Eight of the vestry's 15 seats were up for election in 1980. Five of the vestry's members are elected every year, and three members had met the vestry's mandatory retirement age.) candidates endorsed by Bowers won a supermajority of the votes. Several opponents of the sale established the Committee to Preserve St. Bartholomew's Inc, which was forced to change its name after a lawsuit from the vestry. The committee and vestry remained involved in continuous legal disputes over the next decade.

Competing proposals were submitted in early 1981 by nine developers, including a joint venture of Donald Trump and Peter Kalikow, as well as the Cohen Brothers. Bowers and the vestry agreed in June 1981 to lease out the garden and community house. The parish also hired Princeton University School of Architecture dean Robert Geddes to study the feasibility of the various proposals. That October, the vestry distributed a volume to congregants, predicting that the parish's endowment would be fully exhausted by 1988, and preservationists formed the Save St. Bartholomew's group to oppose the development. At the end of that month, St. Bartholomew's vestry approved the plan and selected British developer Howard P. Ronson to build a 59-story skyscraper on the site. The next month, the congregation voted on the lease proposal; opponents obtained an injunction from the New York Supreme Court, and these votes were nullified. At a second referendum that December, congregants narrowly voted to approve the skyscraper.

The LPC and the New York City Planning Commission still needed to approve the tower, and the Episcopal Diocese of New York had to approve the lease. The Appellate Division of the State Supreme Court placed an injunction on the sale in January 1982 and subsequently moved to reject opponents' appeal. Paul Moore Jr., the bishop of the Episcopal Diocese of New York, approved the lease in February 1982, and a state court approved the lease that May. Opponents, led by J. Sinclair Armstrong, filed additional lawsuits that delayed the project for several months. Ronson was supposed to place a $1 million down payment, but he had only paid $200,000 by the beginning of 1983. The same year, the parish unsuccessfully petitioned the New York State Legislature to pass legislation that would exempt religious institutions from statewide historic-preservation laws.

==== LPC denial and modification ====
The parish submitted their first plans to the LPC in December 1983, which called for demolishing and replacing the community house. The parish argued that the city's landmarks law violated the First Amendment to the United States Constitution. Even so, the LPC unanimously rejected the plans that June. The parish presented modified plans for a 47-story building in December 1984, which were projected to generate an estimated $3.5 million annually, one-third the income of the first plan. Half of the tower's income would have been used to fund programs for the poor. Amid continuing financial issues, the parish fired staff members, closed the main church during the week, reduced the maintenance budget, and cut back worship services and programs to save money.

When the parish celebrated its 150th anniversary in January 1985, the LPC held a public hearing on the revised plans. The LPC unanimously rejected the second plan that July, prompting the parish to file a financial hardship application to allow the community house's demolition. At a public hearing for the hardship application, parish officials said the endowment's real value had declined two-thirds since 1967 due to inflation and that the complex needed $11 million in repairs. A former church trustee claimed that the parish had $6 million on hand, much more than what officials claimed was available. Preservationists filed a lawsuit in the State Supreme Court, claiming that the vestry was mismanaging the parish's funds, but a judge ruled against them that December. The LPC rejected the parish's hardship application in February 1986, saying that church officials had failed to prove that the existing facilities were deficient.

Bowers, who alleged bias from the LPC, sued the city government in the federal Southern District of New York in April 1986, claiming that the law violated the US Constitution. Nearly two-thirds of congregants voted in favor of pursuing the suit that September. Manuela Hoelterhoff of The Wall Street Journal wrote the same year that the parish was likely inflating the project's budget, and the St. Louis Post-Dispatch reported in 1988 that Bowers had an annual income of $100,000 and employed 70 staff members. Opponents sued the parish in the New York Court of Appeals, the state's highest court, and the court ruled in April 1987 that the development did not violate New York's religious corporations law. In two additional rulings in 1987, federal judge John E. Sprizzo ruled that the city's landmark law was constitutional and that the designation did not infringe on the parish's First Amendment rights. The United States Court of Appeals for the Second Circuit upheld this ruling the next year. In March 1991, the Supreme Court of the United States declined to consider the parish's appeal of the city-landmark designation, effectively canceling the tower. The parish had, to date, spent $2.18 million on legal and development fees. (Note: Equivalent to $0 in 2025)

=== Restoration efforts ===
==== 1990s and early 2000s ====
Many congregants who had opposed the tower had left the congregation during the 1980s.

Despite the vestry's fears that the parish would run out of money, the parish had remained solvent enough because of a gradually increasing stock market since 1982. The endowment remained at $9 million in 1991, and it had 600 donors, who could not raise enough money for the parish's programs; by then, the congregation had only 375 regular members attending its two Sunday services. Many congregants who had opposed the tower had left during the 1980s. St. Bartholomew's officials estimated that the parish needed $10 million for its endowment and $20 million for repairs. Church officials said that, if they could not raise funds for the buildings, the congregation would have to relocate. As a conciliatory move to preservationists, church officials asked the New York Landmarks Conservancy to examine the buildings, and the complex began hosting the annual meetings of the Municipal Art Society.

Moore took over as interim rector in 1993 after Bowers announced his retirement. The New York Landmarks Conservancy began conducting a structural examination of the buildings that year. William H. Tully became the congregation's new rector in late 1994. By then, only 300 congregants attended a typical Sunday service; the parish had a net annual deficit of $600,000, and its annual budget had increased to $3.5 million. The endowment had decreased to $6 million endowment, and The New York Times, "the head usher had been fired for divisive behavior". The front steps and garden attracted homeless people and drug addicts. The parish still operated its day-care center, soup kitchen, and 12-bed homeless shelter, as well as a fitness center and a young adults' club. St. Bart's Players continued to perform within the community house. The parish offered two Sunday services, hosted two choirs, and employed four full-time priests; hotel company Marriott Corporation was responsible for maintenance.

To save money, Tully wished to close unprofitable programs, and he hired a general manager to reduce costs further and recruit new congregants. In February 1995, Tully closed the fitness center, which had declined to 263 members, as well as the church's thrift shop. The 350-seat Cafe St. Bart's opened in the community house the same year, becoming popular among tourists and office workers. St. Bart's also received income from lectures and concerts, and it operated a gift shop and daycare center. The parish was also raising money for the restoration of the Cheatham Memorial Garden by the late 1990s. Between 1995 and 2002, the parish's annual pledges increased from about $400,000 to $2.75 million. The parish finally balanced its operating budget in 2000, and St. Bart's had five Sunday services, 600 regular congregants, five choirs, and seven priests by 2002. The parish also hired Reform rabbi Leonard Schoolman to lead St. Bart's Center for Religious Inquiry. By then, writer Paul Wilkes had called St. Bart's one of the United States' "outstanding Protestant congregations". Cafe St. Bart's, which originally operated only during the summer, began operating year-round in late 2003.

==== Mid-2000s to present: Master plan ====
The St. Bart's complex still needed restoration in the beginning of the 21st century. Murphy Burnham & Buttrick Architects created a master plan for St. Bart's in 2004, which proposed $100 million worth of capital improvements. Tully began soliciting donations in October 2007 to fund the highest-priority improvements. Within two months, congregants had raised $15 million, while corporations had donated $2 million for the first phase of the project, which was expected to cost $30 million. St. Bartholomew's received donations from companies that owned or occupied nearby buildings, such as the Conrad N. Hilton Foundation, Rudin Management, Colgate-Palmolive, and Mutual of America. Longtime parishioner Diane Posnak donated a movable platform and altar to St. Bart's in 2011. Tully ultimately retired in 2012.

In the early 2010s, the administration of mayor Michael Bloomberg proposed the Midtown East rezoning, which would allow St. Bartholomew's Church, St. Patrick's Cathedral, and the Central Synagogue to sell their air rights. Previously, the three houses of worship had been unable to sell their air rights because there were no adjacent buildings to which their air rights could be sold. After the National Historic Landmarks Committee of the National Park Service Advisory Board unanimously recommended that St. Bart's be designated a National Historic Landmark, the complex was designated as such in November 2016. The designation was granted because the complex was a major surviving example of Goodhue's work. Restoration of the dome was completed in 2017, and Dean Elliott Wolfe became the congregation's rector the same year. In October 2018, the parish sold the building's air rights to JPMorgan Chase for the construction of the nearby 270 Park Avenue tower.

St. Bart's began renting out its swimming pool and basketball courts in mid-2023, and the parish announced that it would close its preschool at the end of the 2023–2024 academic year due to high costs. In early 2024, St. Bart's sold 250,000 square feet (23,000 m^{2}) of air rights to a group led by Citadel LLC for $78 million. After Wolfe's retirement in 2025, Peter Thompson was appointed as the congregation's interim rector.

== Buildings ==
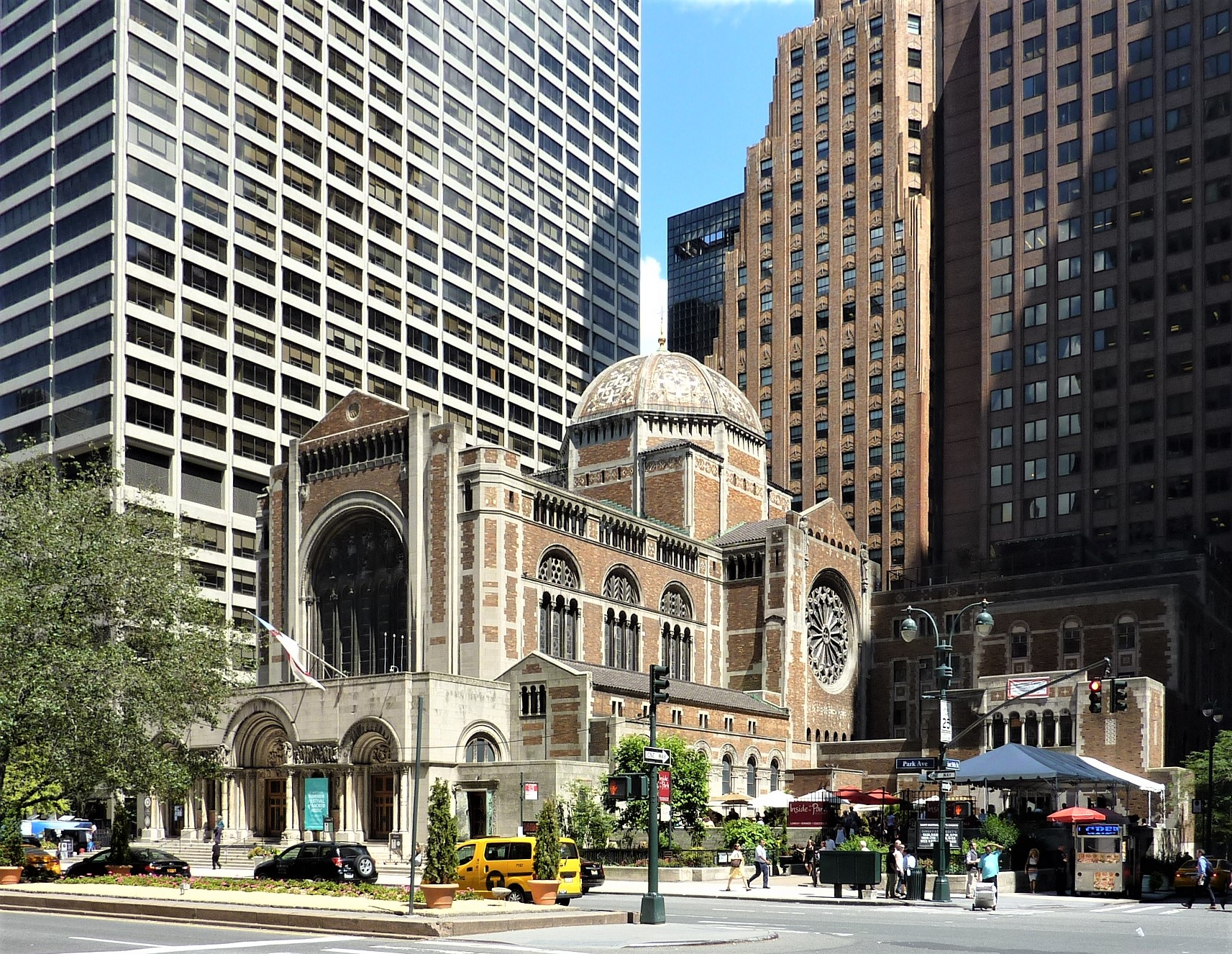
The main church seen from the southwest

The St. Bartholomew's Church complex is located at 325 Park Avenue, on the eastern sidewalk between 50th and 51st Streets, in Midtown Manhattan, New York City, United States. The site measures 200 feet (61 m) wide on Park Avenue to the west, 250 feet (76 m) wide on 51st Street to the north, and 225 feet (69 m) wide on 50th Street to the south. The main church sits on Park Avenue, while to the southeast (away from Park Avenue) is a community house. Surrounding the complex, the rest of the block is occupied by the GE Building to the northeast, designed by Cross & Cross, and another office building to the southeast, designed by the Eggers Group. The facades of both buildings on the block were designed in a similar color scheme as the church complex. The Waldorf Astoria New York is located across 50th Street to the south.

The overall design, and the integration of architetural elements and iconography, is attributed to Bertram Goodhue and his firm. The main building was designed by Goodhue himself, and the community house was by Mayers, Murray and Philips, a successor to Goodhue's practice. Seen from the southwest, the main building and community house used the same materials, a design choice intended to create the impression of a uniform building, especially as seen from the southwest. The complex's initial design elements were influenced by onetime rector Leighton Parks, and the design also has architectural ornament by Hildreth Meière and Lee Lawrie. Much of Goodhue's original design remains intact.

When the Park Avenue building was announced in 1916, Royal Cortissoz wrote: "This church is so good as it stands that we hope it may be built along certain lines promising to give it even greater significance." Ada Louise Huxtable wrote: "With all the exterior elements meticulously matched in scale and style, the complex is meant to look like one building, and it does." A reporter for the St. Louis Post-Dispatch wrote that the main building "is something of a hodgepodge – a blocky, domed structure of salmon-colored stone with a mixture of Byzantine and Romanesque stylistic elements, and Gothic touches in the fenestration", while the community house was in a "restrained, and more profane, version of the same style". Christine Smith called the church complex "a jewel in a monumental setting" in 1988.

=== Main structure ===
The building is designed in the Byzantine Revival style. The building was initially described as being in the Romanesque style, although this was likely done to placate the Vanderbilt family, who preferred a Romanesque design; sources published after 1923, when the Vanderbilts left the congregation, almost invariably described the style as Byzantine Revival. Many of the current building's decorative features were salvaged from the second building, including the main entrance portico on the western elevation of the facade, as well as almost all of the furnishings that were added to the second church during the 1890s. According to writer Christine Smith, the furnishings from the second church are all placed in "positions of secondary importance".

Goodhue's original design called for a vast, barrel-vaulted space without side aisles or chapels and with severely reduced transepts. As designed, the church building has a cruciform arrangement and runs parallel to Manhattan's street grid. The narthex at the western end of the church building, facing Park Avenue, is 75 feet (23 m) wide; the nave is about half as wide as the narthex and is topped by a gable roof. The transepts extend north and south from a crossing at the eastern end of the nave. The north transept extends above a mortuary chapel. The south transept incorporates a chapel at its base and was originally intended to lead to a never-built cloister. As built, the southern section of the nave is connected to a one-story chapel with its own entrance, and the south transept leads to the community house.

==== Exterior ====
Goodhue used a facade of marble and brick. The brickwork was primarily of two colors, salmon and "warm gray", which was intended as an allusion to Italian churches. The Piccirilli Brothers created cast-stone decorations, both for the facade and for the interior, in various Italian architectural styles. The decorations included figures on the west elevation and south transept, such as depictions of gargoyles, as well as sculptures of saints on the south transept. The church building also contains Italian Romanesque-style capitals, and the north transept featured Byzantine and Romanesque-inspired plaques. Goodhue's original plans did not include stained-glass windows, but they were added after the church building was completed.

==== Western elevation ====
Park Avenue entrance

The primary elevation of the church building faces west toward Park Avenue. The Park Avenue elevation contains a portico with three archways, each containing a bronze double door. The portico also has Cipollino marble columns and green-marble paneling. Designed for the second church, the portico was inspired by the church of Saint-Gilles, Gard, in France. Daniel Chester French designed the portals themselves; Herbert Adams was responsible for the northernmost doors; French's assistant Andrew O'Connor executed the main door; and Philip Martiny designed the southernmost doors. Each door contains a panel with representations of events in the saints' lives. The portico contains twelve blue-green columns, which were intended to contrast visually with the original green hue of each bronze door. The central portal is flanked by two friezes, depicting scenes from the Old Testament and New Testament, each of which measure 12 feet (3.7 m) long.

There is a secondary entrance to the baptistry along Park Avenue, which has bronze doors designed by Albert Stewart and installed in 1931. Recessed above the portico's central doorway is an enormous round-arched window. The round arch is filled with a stained-glass window salvaged from the second church building. The window contains tracery that may have been inspired by Celtic, Islamic, and Italian Romanesque sources. The western elevation also contains a heavy tympanum with vertical lancets beneath it.

==== Other elevations ====
On the northern and southern elevations, three arched windows on each elevation illuminate the aisles of the nave, which extends from the western end of the church building to the crossing. The south transept is illuminated by an ornate rose window flanked by two statues, which may have been inspired by that of St Mark's Basilica. The rose window originally contained tinted glass, which was replaced in the 1940s with stained glass designed by Reynolds, Francis & Rohnstock. The north transept has a relief of a large cross with various symbols surrounding a medallion. John Gordon Guthrie designed additional stained-glass windows on both transepts, and six windows in the northern aisle, which were installed in 1929. Meière designed four more stained-glass windows for the upper section of the nave. Meière's windows, as well as two additional stained-glass windows by Allyn Cox, were added in the 1960s.

Mayers, Murray and Philips also inserted a dome, which substituted for an unbuilt spire. (Note: Goodhue's initial proposal called for a tower with a dome, which he called a "Ciborium" but which was rejected because of its high cost. In Goodhue's former studio at 2 West 47th Street, Christopher Gray noted the discovery of "a photograph of the office's reception room containing a huge model of St. Bartholomew's with a giant spire that was never built".) The crossing contained a square base for the spire, which would have been twice as high as the rest of the church building, with more ornate decoration. When the vestry rejected the spire, Goodhue's firm decided to design an octagonal dome, inspired by the dome of the California State Building at the Panama–California Exposition. The dome, rising 140 feet (43 m) above the crossing, is supported by a large square drum. It contains eight stone ribs that cut through its surface. The exterior of the dome is made of stone and brick and contains mosaic tile patterning. As planned, the dome was to measure 50 feet (15 m) across and contain stained-glass windows.

==== Interior ====
Interior of the nave, looking toward the entrance

Originally, the church building was intended to accommodate 1,488 people, although later sources cite the interior as having a capacity of 1,250 or 1,300. The structural framework consists of concrete beams with stone and marble cladding. Due to financial shortfalls at the time of the building's completion, many decorative features were not completed for several years. Elements of the Gothic style were incorporated into the interior design later on.

The narthex, spanning 75 feet (23 m) wide and entirely contained behind the triple portal, contains an Art Deco-style artwork by Meière, The Six Days of Creation. The artwork consists of five domes with gold mosaic tiles. The narthex has light marble cladding. Past the narthex, the nave is 250 feet (76 m) long and 44 feet (13 m) wide. The westernmost section of the nave (nearest the narthex) divided into three bays on the north and south sides, interspersed by four pairs of columns. There is a gallery level behind these columns, while the western facade's massive arched window is recessed behind the west wall. Also on the west wall is a wooden organ loft.

East of the three bays is the crossing, which has a rectangular plan with four stone arches, one on each side. Meière designed the ceiling of the crossing, which is physically separate from the exterior dome. The ceiling is made of Guastavino tile and decorated with wooden beams. Goodhue originally intended to design the crossing's ceiling in the Romanesque style, but it was completed after Goodhue's death in a Hispano-Moresque style. Cornelius Vanderbilt had donated a mural by Francis Lathrop, which had been placed behind the Madison Avenue building's altar but was relocated to the current building's north transept. Since 2011, St. Bart's has contained a four-piece movable platform and altar, which is made of wood and medallions reused from old pews. The pieces are normally stored at the transepts' corners but can be assembled when necessary.

East of the nave, the choir and the apse's lower section are clad with light-colored marble, while the rest of the apse is decorated with mosaic tiles, glass, and marble. Goodhue had originally planned to cover the apse in marble, divided by ornamental-tile bands, although the vestry decided not to install these decorations to save money. The apse's marble revetment was added in 1929 and consists of vertically-arranged marble panels with mosaic-tile frames. A mosaic artwork in the apse's ceiling depicts the Transfiguration of Jesus. The current church also contains a large marble baptismal font from the second building. There is an altar rail and a communion rail, both made of colored marble and mosaic tiles; pieces of these rails may have come from the second building. The chancel contains Cosmati marble pavement, as well as mosaic tiles and choir stalls from the second building. There are also two chancel screens, which were dedicated in 1954; they represent the tree of life and measure 18 feet (5.5 m) wide by 25 feet (7.6 m) long. The pulpit, designed by Lawrie, is placed along the apse's wall. The pulpit is supported by a set of colonnettes, and its railing contains depictions of various figures.

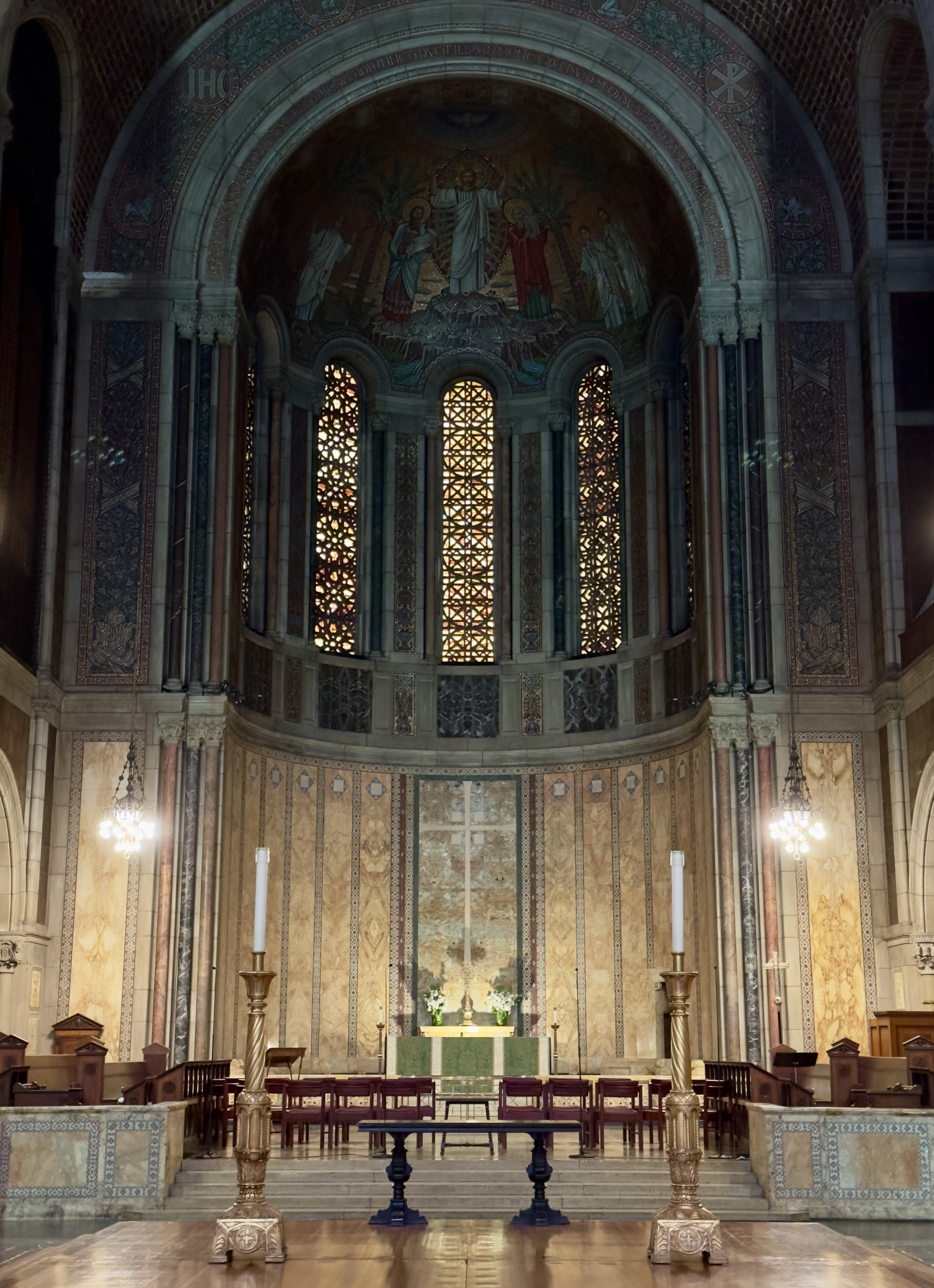
The apse

East of the northern transept is a baptistry with a marble font and a reredos from the Madison Avenue church building. There is also a chapel reached from Park Avenue, which connects to a vestibule with doorways into the narthex and a "Bride's Room" (later a restroom). A double-mahogany door from the nave's side aisle provides additional access to the chapel. The chapel has granite columns that support a trussed timber ceiling; there is a cornice just below the ceiling, with biblical inscriptions. The south wall has six windows made of stained glass The chapel has a white marble altar, which has a replica of a 15th-century cross, two wooden candelabra, and marble columns supporting an arch. The painting Adoration of the Magi by Ethel Parsons Paullin, and a corresponding mural by her husband Telford Paullin, are placed within the arch.

=== Community house ===
The community house is variously cited as being designed in the Byzantine or Art Deco styles. Sources disagree on whether it is five or six stories high; an unpublished analysis in 1985 cited the community house as having seven levels, including basements. The exterior of the community house is constructed of brick and stone, and there are flat roofs at multiple levels. An enclosed loggia connects with the main building, a vestige of Goodhue's original conception, which had called for a gable roofed farmhouse-style structure. On 50th Street, a doorway is topped by a carved phrase and a tympanum depicting saints and Christ; a door with a similar tympanum leads to the main church. There are setbacks at the third and fifth stories.

The 1985 analysis found that the community house had 33,325 square feet (3,096.0 m^{2}) of usable space. The community house has an auditorium, a gymnasium, dining rooms, and a swimming pool. Robert W. Norwood, the rector who oversaw construction, said that he wanted "to begin with an auditorium, and build the rest of the Community House around it". The ground-level swimming pool measured 90 by 40 feet (27 by 12 m) across and ranged in depth from 4 to 9 feet (1.2 to 2.7 m). There was also a ground-level gymnasium measuring 65 by 45 feet (20 by 14 m) across and 23 feet (7.0 m) high; it was used for indoor basketball and tennis. The first floor had an 700-seat auditorium with a small stage, while the second floor had staff offices and a non-circulating library. The women's floor occupied the third story and had parlors, as well as lounges with folding tables. The fourth story contained a men's floor with pool rooms, billiard rooms, parlors, and lounges; there was also a grill room for luncheons. The top stories were used by children's programs such as the former kindergarten. Most of the community house's interior decorations were intact in the 1980s but had been substantially changed by the 2010s.

=== Other landscape features ===
Walkway to the Great Terrace

The main church and the community house form an L shape, which surrounds a plaza at the site's southwest corner. This space, located directly above the Community House's below-ground spaces, is known as the Great Terrace and is made of bluestone and red quarry tiles. The terrace is accessed by steps from Park Avenue; these steps have had gardens on either side since 1927. The northern portion of the church complex's site also includes the Sallie Franklin Cheatham Memorial Garden, which William Hamby designed in 1968, 1971, or 1972. It consists of two fountains and a series of carved channels that originally carried water.

== Members ==
The congregation reported 2,239 members in 2023; no membership statistics were reported in 2024 parochial reports. Plate and pledge income reported for the congregation in 2024 was $2,392,909 with average Sunday attendance (ASA) of 361 persons. When the congregation was founded, its members included judge Samuel Jones and businessmen William B. Astor and William H. Vanderbilt. Over the years, the church has hosted memorial services for figures such as former U.S. first lady Lou Henry Hoover in 1944, politician Newbold Morris in 1966, publisher Malcolm Forbes in 1990, actress Lillian Gish in 1993, and Jamal James Kent in 2024. Gish, her sister Dorothy, and their mother Mary are interred in the church's columbarium.

== Services and programs ==
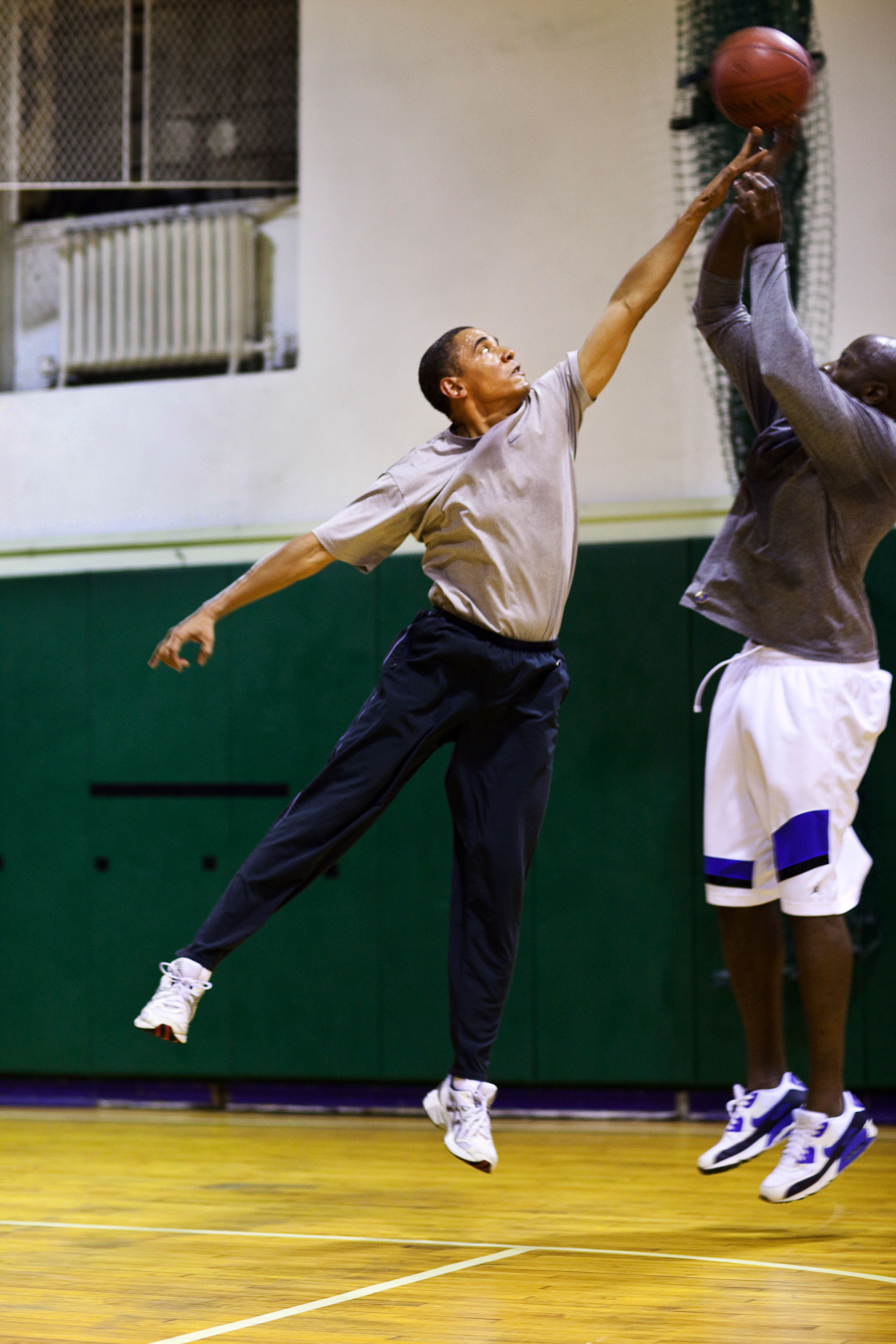
US president Barack Obama plays basketball with personal aide Reggie Love at St. Bartholomew's Church in 2009

As of 2026, St. Bartholomew's Church has three services each Sunday; one of these services is livestreamed. The church also had a Thursday-evening Communion service and weekday Eucharist and Compline services. The church building hosts public tours on Sundays, and the parish rents out the community house's pool and basketball court to the public. Also open to non-congregants is a restaurant, Inside Park at St. Bart's; this restaurant serves American cuisine.

Over the years, St. Bartholomew's has hosted a variety of programs. The Emma J. Adams Memorial Fund, established in 1933, financed a food pantry and homeless shelter at St. Bart's, one of the first such programs in a New York City church. A 1988 news report wrote that the parish operated a homeless shelter, an employment office, a health clinic, a day-care center, and Sunday school programs in several languages. By the 21st century, it had a summer school, soup kitchen, pantry, and shelter; it also has a preschool until 2024. The modern parish also has its own theatrical troupe, St. Bart's Players, which has been running since 1927.

=== Music ===
St. Bart's first organ was manufactured by J. H. & C. S. Odell c. 1874 and had 58 manuals. It was supplemented in 1894 by an organ manufactured by George Hutchings, which incorporated the original Odell organ and had 96 ranks, making it one of the largest organs in the United States. The organ at St. Bart's current building, a Skinner Organ Company pipe organ, is the largest in New York City and is one of the world's largest, This organ is housed beneath the crossing and has 12,422 pipes, 163 stops, and 225 ranks. The organ was commissioned in May 1930 and was dedicated on December 9, 1930. The current configuration of the organ dates from 1971; it is controlled by a movable organ console with five manuals, which was added in 2005.

One of the parish's former choir-directors was Leopold Stokowski, who was brought from the United Kingdom by St. Bart's; he helped popularize orchestral music in the US. Another of the parish's music directors was Harold Friedell, the well-known composer and Juilliard educator. The parish's choir has been directed by conductors such as Jack Ossewaarde, Jim Litton, and William Trafka. The music program includes the Great Music at St. Bart's concert series, operated by the Mid-Manhattan Performing Arts Foundation since 2010. Musical performances include the annual A Joyous Christmas Concert program, performed by the choir's choristers, as well as concerts such as a 2010 performance of Charles Mingus songs.

== See also ==
- List of New York City Designated Landmarks in Manhattan from 14th to 59th Streets
- List of National Historic Landmarks in New York City
- National Register of Historic Places listings in Manhattan from 14th to 59th Streets
- List of presiding bishops of the Episcopal Church in the United States of America
- Succession of Bishops of the Episcopal Church in the United States
