= Julie Halston =

American actress and comedian

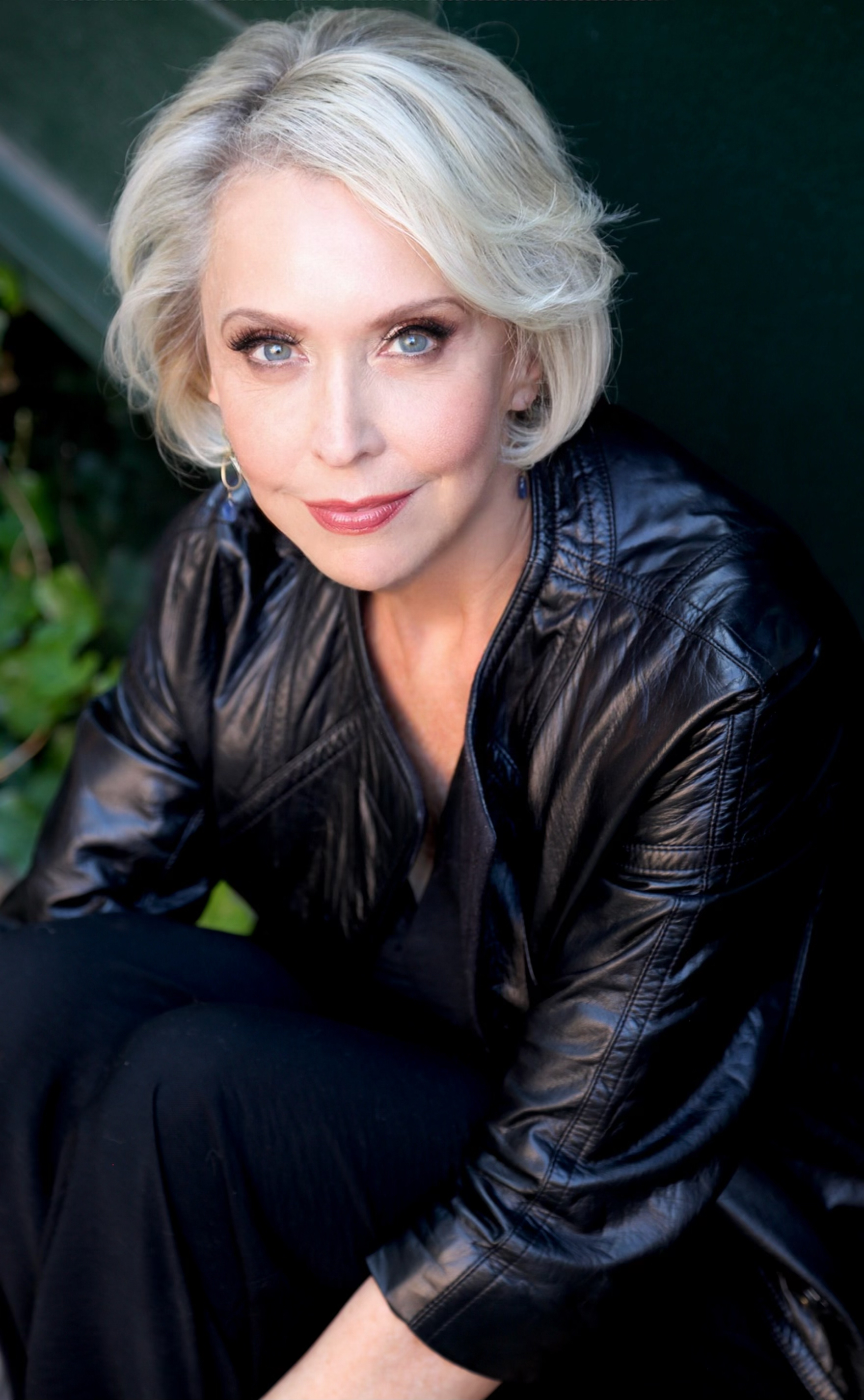
- Born: Julie Abatelli; December 7, 1954 (age 71); Flushing, Queens, New York, U.S.
- Education: Hofstra University (BA)
- Occupations: Actress, comedian
- Years active: 1984–present
- Spouse: Ralph Howard (m. 1992; died 2018)

Julie Halston (born December 7, 1954) is an American actress and comedian who appeared on television, film, and theatre. She received four Drama Desk Award nominations for her Broadway performances, and in 2020 was awarded the Isabelle Stevenson Award at the 74th Tony Awards. On television, Halston is best known for playing socialite Bitsy von Muffling in the HBO comedy series, Sex and The City, its film continuation, and the sequel series, And Just Like That....

== Early life and education ==
Julie Halston was born in Flushing, Queens. Her parents, Rudolph "Rudy" Abatelli and Julia Madeline "Dolly" (née Gardner) moved to Commack, Long Island, when Halston was four years old. After attending a Catholic high school, she graduated from Hofstra University, cum laude, with a Bachelor of Arts degree in theatre arts.

== Career ==
Halston first achieved recognition as an actress through her co-starring performances in the comedy plays of writer-performer, Charles Busch in the 1980s in New York City. She was a founding member of his theatre company, Theatre-in-Limbo, which along with other writers and performers such as Charles Ludlam, Lypsinka, Ann Magnuson, and John Fleck, to name a few, were part of a cultural movement that helped revitalize the Off-Broadway theatre. Busch considered Halston his muse and wrote many roles for her in his plays including Vampire Lesbians of Sodom (1984), The Lady in Question (1989), Red Scare on Sunset (1991), You Should be so Lucky (1994), The Divine Sister (2011), and The Tribute Artist (2013).

She wrote a series of one-woman comedy shows that eventually led to a successful Off-Broadway production entitled Julie Halston's Lifetime of Comedy (1992). The show earned her an Outer Critics Circle nomination for Best Play and landed Halston a CBS network development deal. The pilot was called Those Two and co-starred Harvey Fierstein. It was written by Bob Randall, the co-producer of Kate and Allie. The show was not developed into a series and Halston returned to the stage and subsequently appeared in many Off-Broadway and Broadway shows including The Man Who Came to Dinner (2000), The Women (2001), Hairspray (2002), Gypsy (2003), Twentieth Century (2004), Anything Goes (2012-replacement), You Can't Take it with You (2014), On The Town (2015), Tootsie (2019) and Our Town (2024).

Halston received Drama Desk Award nominations for Outstanding Featured Actress in a Play for Red Scare on Sunset (1991), White Chocolate (2004), The Divine Sister (2011), and You Can't Take it With You (2014). In addition she received the Richard Seff Award for her portrayal of Gay Wellington in You Can't Take it With You.

On September 26, 2021, the Tony Awards Administration Committee presented Halston with the Isabelle Stevenson Tony Award for her advocacy in raising awareness and funding for the Pulmonary Fibrosis Foundation.

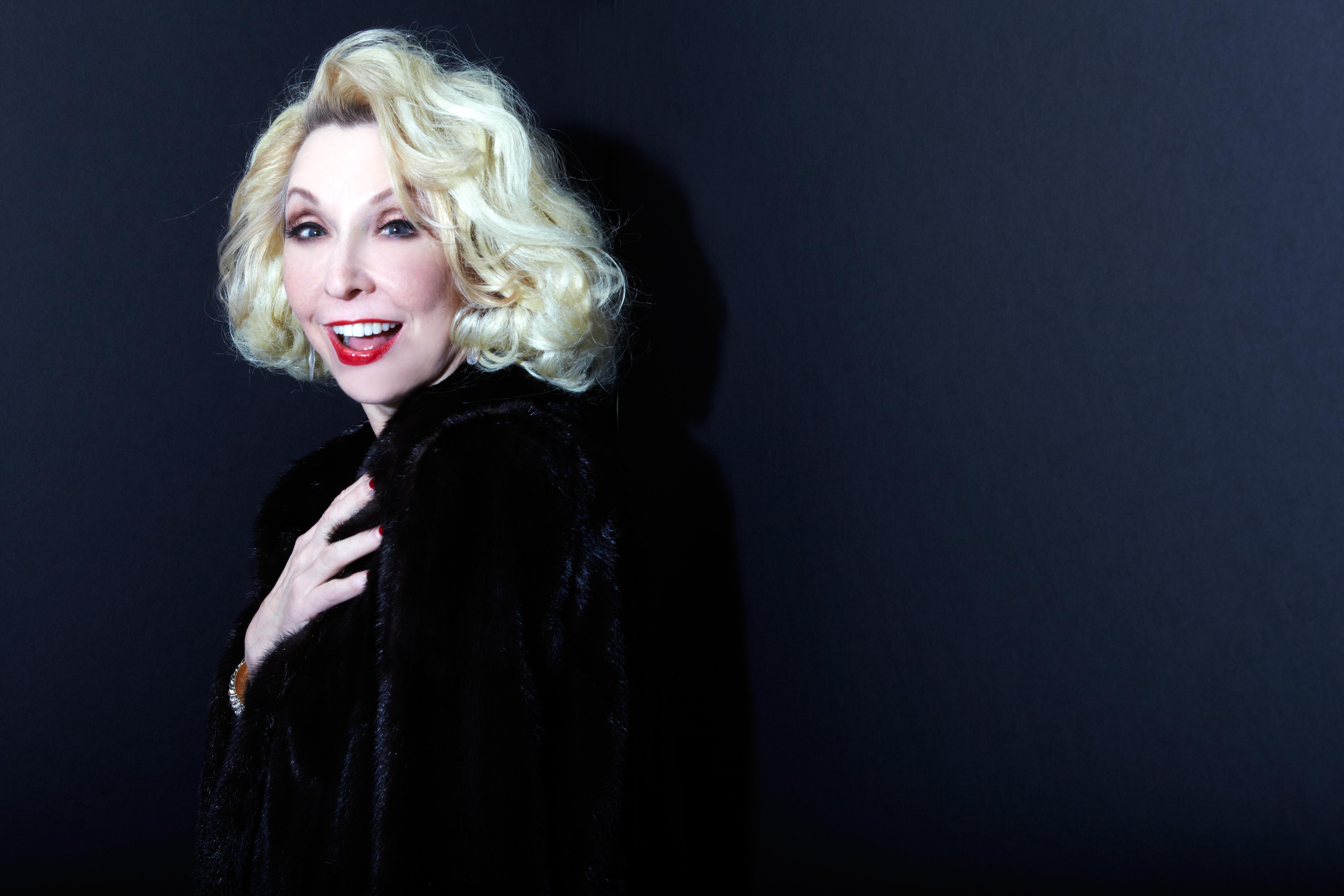
Julie Halston

Her solo comedy performances at the Birdland Jazz Club are SRO engagements that have earned her four MAC Awards (Manhattan Association of Cabarets & Clubs). In 2011, Halston received the designation "Legend of Off-Broadway" from the Off-Broadway Theatre Alliance and received an Excellence in Theatre Award from the Abington Theatre Company. In 2008, along with fellow writer Donna Daley, she co-authored the book Monologues for Show-Offs published by Heinemann Press. The book is used by casting agents, colleges, and performers for audition material. In May 2020, along with Jim Caruso, Halston launched a popular online talk show titled Virtual Halston and all 41 episodes are available on YouTube.

Halston has 45 film and TV credits to her name including the 2022 independent feature Simchas and Sorrows (Maude), Intermedium (Winona James), Dirty Rhetoric (Elizabeth) and Chosen Family (Dorothy), both currently in post-production. In addition, the 2021 independent feature The Sixth Reel (Helen), co-starring Charles Busch, has just received national distribution. Halston also starred in the award-winning 2016 short film Hotel Bleu (Jackie). Her television credits include HBO Max's Gossip Girl (Sharon), The Good Fight (Rita), HBO Max's Divorce (Sharon), Woody Allen's Crisis in Six Scenes (Roz), The TV web series The Mentors, for which she won a NYC Web Fest award for Special Guest Star (2016), Difficult People (Hazel), Law and Order, Special Victims Unit (Cassie Muir), The Electric Company (Mrs. Carruthers), Sex and the City and And Just Like That... (Bitsy von Muffling), The Class (Tina Carmello), and Law and Order (Mrs. Lapinsky). She has also appeared in the films A Very Serious Person, The Juror, Addams Family Values, Joe Gould's Secret, Drunks, Small Time Crooks, Celebrity, and I Think I Love My Wife.

== Personal life ==
In 1992, Halston married anchor man and entertainment reporter Ralph Howard. Howard worked for WINS and The Howard Stern Show at Sirius XM until his retirement in 2013. Howard died on August 7, 2018, from complications of pulmonary fibrosis.

== Filmography ==
=== Film ===
Year	Title	Role	Notes
1993	Addams Family Values	Mrs. Glicker	
1995	Drunks	Carol	
1995	Mighty Aphrodite	Guest	Uncredited
1996	The Juror	Inez	
1997	David Searching	Julie	
1998	Celebrity	Patient with Jowls	
2000	Joe Gould's Secret	Sadie Gordon	
2000	Small Time Crooks	Concert Party Guest	
2005	The Lady in Question Is Charles Busch	Herself	
2006	A Very Serious Person	Glenda	
2007	I Think I Love My Wife	Convenience Store Cashier	
2008	Sex and the City	Bitsy von Muffling	Uncredited
2014	Are You Joking?	Gloria	
2014	Top Five	Cell Phone Lady	
2021	The Sixth Reel	Helen	
2022	Simchas and Sorrows	Maude	
2022	Dirty Rhetoric	Elizabeth	
2023	Intermedium	Winona James	
2024	Chosen Family	Dorothy	

=== Television ===
Year	Title	Role	Notes
1991, 1998	Law & Order	Ms. Lapinsky / Jane	2 episodes
1992	Doug	Voice	13 episodes
1993	Dottie Gets Spanked	Dottie Frank	Television film
1994	My So-Called Life	Mrs. Szowski	Episode: "Guns and Gossip"
2000	The Man Who Came to Dinner	Mrs. McCutcheon	Television film
2001	Spy Groove	Dandelion Splendorface	Episode: "Malibooboo"
2002	Law & Order: Criminal Intent	Gallery Owner	Episode: "Crazy"
2002	Stage on Screen: The Women	Various roles	Television film
2002, 2003	Sex and the City	Bitsy Von Muffling	2 episodes
2006–2007	The Class	Tina Carmello	8 episodes
2008–2009	The Battery's Down	Bunny Steinberg	4 episodes
2009	The Electric Company	Ms. Carruthers	Episode: "Out to Launch"
2011	Jack in a Box	Dawn	Episode: "The Surprise"
2015	Law & Order: Special Victims Unit	Cassie Muir	Episode: "Perverted Justice"
2015	Difficult People	Hazel	Episode: "Premium Membership"
2016	Crisis in Six Scenes	Roz	3 episodes
2016	The Mentors	Mentor	Episode: "Julie Halston & Austin Durant"
2018	After Forever	Moira Michaels	Episode: "Rumors"
2019	Divorce	Sharon	Episode: "Miami"
2020	Almost Family	Joyce Tune	Episode: "Generational AF"
2021	The Good Fight	Rita	Episode: "And the Détente Had an End..."
2021–2025	And Just Like That...	Bitsy Von Muffling	5 episodes
2021–2023	Gossip Girl	Sharon Kleinberg	3 episodes

=== Stage ===
Year	Title	Role	Notes
1985	Times Square Angel	Mrs. Tooley/Stella	Provincetown Playhouse
1989	The Lady in Question	Kitty	Orpheum Theatre, Off-Broadway
1990	Money Talks	Claudia Stein	Promenade Theatre, Off-Broadway
1991	Rare Scare on Sunset	Pat Pilford	Lucille Lortel Theatre, Off-Broadway
1992	Lifetime of Comedy	Herself	Bleecker Street Theatre, Off-Broadway
1994	You Should Be So Lucky	Lenore	Primary Stages, Off-Broadway
1997	The Boys from Syracuse	Berry Courtesan	New York City Center, Off-Broadway
2000	The Man Who Came to Dinner	Mrs. McCutcheon	American Airlines Theatre, Broadway
2000	Saved or Destroyed	Lucille	Rattlestick Playwrights Theater, Off-Broadway
2001	The Women	First Saleswoman/Lucy	American Airlines Theatre, Broadway
2003	Gypsy	Electra/Miss Cratchitt	Sam S. Shubert Theatre, Broadway
2004	Twentieth Century	Ida Webb	American Airlines Theatre, Broadway
2004	White Chocolate	Vivian Beale Somerset	Century Center for the Performing Arts, Off-Broadway
2005	Hairspray	Denizen of Baltimore (Replacement)/Prudy Pingleton (Replacement)	Neil Simon Theatre, Broadway
2009	Chasing Manet	Iris/Rita/Charlotte	59E59 Theaters, Off-Broadway
2010	The Divine Sister	Sister Acacius	SoHo Playhouse, Off-Broadway
2011	Olive and the Bitter Herbs	Wendy	59E59 Theaters, Off-Broadway
2012	Anything Goes	Mrs. Evangeline Harcourt (Replacement)	Stephen Sondheim Theatre, Broadway
2014	The Tribute Artist	Rita	59E59 Theaters, Off-Broadway
2014	You Can't Take It with You	Gay Wellington	Longacre Theatre, Broadway
2015	A Confederacy of Dunces	Miss Trixie	Huntington Theatre Company
2015	Ever After	Queen Marie of France	Paper Mill Playhouse
2015	On the Town	Maude P. Dilly (Replacement)	Lyric Theatre, Broadway
2016	The Babylon Line	Midge Braverman	Lincoln Center Theater, Off-Broadway
2017	Murder on the Orient Express	Helen Hubbard	McCarter Theatre Center
2019	Tootsie	Rita Marshall	Marquis Theatre, Broadway
2021	Fairycakes	Titania	Greenwich House Theater, Off-Broadway
2023	Babbitt	Mrs. Frink/Mrs. Bumbleworth/Opal Mudge/Miss McGoun/Storyteller 6	La Jolla Playhouse
2024	Breaking the Story	Gummy	Second Stage Theater, Off-Broadway
2024	Our Town	Mrs. Soames	Ethel Barrymore Theatre, Broadway
