= Theater for the New City =

Theater in Manhattan, New York

- Formation: March 1971
- Founders: Crystal Field, George Bartenieff, Theo Barnes and Lawrence Kornfeld
- Type: Off-off-Broadway theatre company
- Location: Manhattan
- Artistic director: Crystal Field
- Website: theaterforthenewcity.net
Theater for the New City
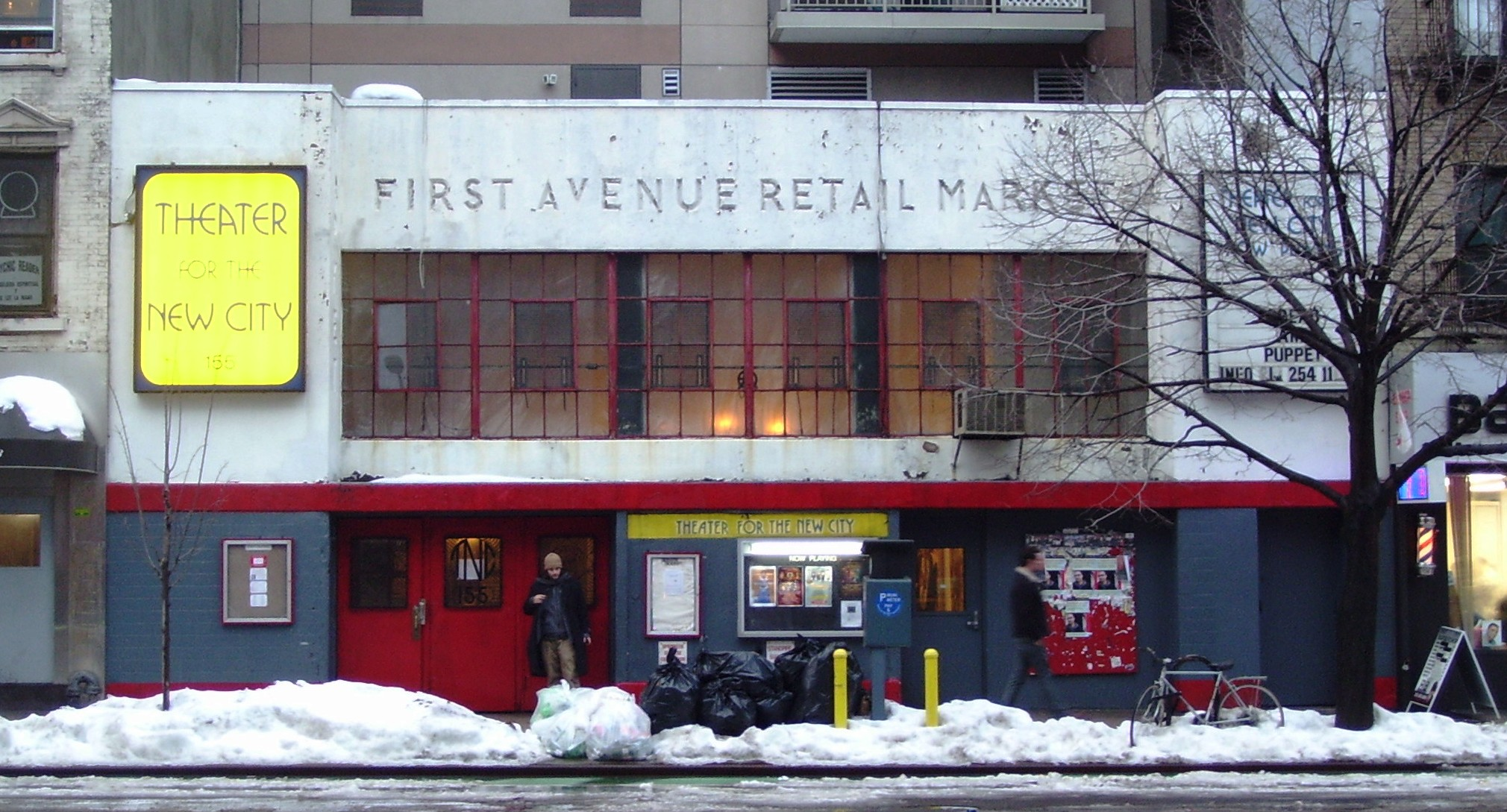
- Theater for the New City has been located in a former New York City retail market at 155 First Avenue since 1986.
- Interactive map of Theater for the New City
- Address: 155 First Avenue; New York City
- Coordinates: 40.7286°N 73.9848°W
- Capacity: Joyce and Seward Johnson Theater: 250; Cino Theater: 73; Community Space Theater: 99; Cabaret Theater: 65

Theater for the New City, founded in 1971 and known familiarly as TNC, is one of New York City's leading off-off-Broadway theaters, known for radical political plays and community commitment. Productions at TNC have won 43 Obie Awards and the Pulitzer Prize for Drama. TNC currently exists as a 4-theater complex in a 30,000-square-foot (2,800 m^{2}) space at 155 First Avenue, in the East Village of Manhattan.

== History ==
=== 1970s ===
Crystal Field and George Bartenieff founded Theater for the New City in 1971 with Theo Barnes and Lawrence Kornfeld, who was the Resident Director of Judson Poets Theatre, where the four had met. Feeling that Judson Poets Theatre had peaked, they decided to form a theater of their own for poetic work that would also encompass a community ideal. The impulse to form a company coincided with the availability of a space at the Westbeth Artists Community in the West Village. Bartenieff, Field, Barnes and Kornfeld named their new company "Theater for the New City" after a speech in which then-mayor John V. Lindsay envisioned a "new city" for all.

The theater officially opened in March 1971. Its initial two seasons included plays by Richard Foreman, Charles Ludlam, Miguel Piñero and Jean-Claude van Itallie. Theater for the New City also began its Annual Summer Street Theater, and founded the Village Halloween Parade with puppeteer Ralph Lee. The Parade won an Obie Award under TNC administration, but a desire to be much more commercially viable than TNC's anti-establishment spirit would allow caused Ralph Lee to form his own Parade Committee and split from TNC in 1973. TNC subsequently inaugurated its Village Halloween Costume Ball, which it still holds to this day.

TNC saw some major changes in its first year. Kornfeld and Barnes resigned, leaving Bartenieff as Executive Director and Field as Artistic Director. TNC also moved from Westbeth Artists Community and found a new home in the Jane West, a former seaman's hotel at 113 Jane Street, in a run-down area of the West Village by the Hudson River. Theater for the New City played a large part in rehabilitating the neighborhood, and the theater it created would later be known as the Jane Street Theater and house successes such as Hedwig and the Angry Inch. During its time at the Jane West, Theater for the New City cemented its reputation for being the most avant of avant-garde theater, offering radical political plays, experimental poetic works, dance theater, musical theater and even film. Mabou Mines found a home at Theater for the New City as did playwrights such as Romulus Linney, Harvey Fierstein, H. M. Koutoukas, Arthur Sainer, Howard Zinn, and Maria Irene Fornes. A musical adaptation of Antoine de Saint-Exupéry’s The Little Prince in 1973 featured a young Tim Robbins in the title role. The 1976 play Dinosaur Door by Barbara Garson featured a young Vin Diesel.

In 1977, the theater moved from the West Village to the East Village, converting a former Tabernacle Baptist church at 156 2nd Avenue, near East 10th Street, into a cultural complex with a rehearsal room and three theaters named after Joe Cino, Charles Stanley and James Waring. Notable productions in the late 1970s and 1980s include the American premiere of two of Heiner Muller’s plays, Hamletmachine in 1984 and Quartett in 1985; and Buried Child by Sam Shepard in 1978. The Theater for the New City production of Buried Child moved off-Broadway to the Theatre de Lys and in 1979, and became the first off-off-Broadway play to win the Pulitzer Prize.

=== 1980s–1990s ===
Rent in New York City began to increase exponentially in the early 1980s and Theater for the New City was forced to find another home in 1984 after its rent increased 300%. With the help of Bess Myerson, Ruth Messinger and David Dinkins, the theater was able to purchase an underutilized 30,000-square-foot (2,800 m^{2}) former WPA building one block east at 155 First Avenue in 1986. The first Halloween Ball to take place in the new location was held in tents pitched on 10th Street because a Certificate of Occupancy hadn't yet been obtained. Refusing to close doors during renovation, TNC threw up two interim theater spaces, which like its predecessors in the 2nd Avenue building, were named after off-off-Broadway founders Joe Cino and Charles Stanley. The first completed theater was created with the help of sculptor John Seward Johnson II of the Johnson & Johnson family and his wife Joyce. In honor of its benefactors, it was named the Joyce and Seward Johnson Theater. It is currently one of the largest theaters off-off-Broadway. Renovation of the building was finally completed in 2001.

Responding to the homeless problem of the late 1980s and government cutbacks in the arts, TNC created an after school Arts-in-Education program for shelter children in 1990. Budget cuts also forced the theater to reluctantly raise its admission prices from $4 to $5–$7 in 1993 ($7 was then the price of a movie ticket) and then to $10 in 1994. The current cap on ticket prices is $20. Other major changes in this period include the resignation of George Bartenieff in 1992. Crystal Field remains as Executive Artistic Director.

=== Current status and events ===
TNC continues to produce 30-40 new plays per year, along with its Annual Summer Street Theater, the Annual Village Halloween Costume Ball and the Lower East Side Festival of the Arts, which was created in 1996 to celebrate the ethnic and artistic diversity of TNC's Lower East Side neighborhood. From 2006 to 2008, TNC presented the NY Uke Fest, a 4 night, 3 day celebration of ukulele music, under the direction of Uke Jackson and the New York Ukulele Ensemble. Many first generation off-off-Broadway playwrights continue to present their work at TNC, among them Charles Busch (who premiered his plays Shanghai Moon at TNC in 1999, The Divine Sister in 2010, and Judith of Bethulia in 2012), Jean-Claude van Itallie and Tom O'Horgan. More recent TNC alumni include Tony Award-winning director Moises Kaufman, who directed his first American plays at TNC after emigrating from his native Argentina, and Nobel Prize winner Gao Xinjian, whose first play in America was staged at TNC in 1997. Other notable playwrights to have their work presented at TNC include Bina Sharif, Barbara Kahn, Laurence Holder, Raymond J. Barry, Trav S.D. and Matt Morillo. TNC continues to be a haven for Emerging playwrights, and in 2006, a play reading series, New City, New Blood, was created in order to further showcase new works.

In addition to their Community Festivals, several outside groups are presented at TNC. Annually, the Bread & Puppet Theater and the Thunderbird American Indian Dancers are presented by TNC, and each December, noted Playwright and TNC Alum Charles Busch holds a staged reading of his play Times Square Angel.

In 2004, TNC began holding an annual Valentine's Day Benefit. The Love N' Courage Benefit is held on a Monday night, near Valentine's Day. Beginning in 2007, this benefit is held at The National Arts Club. The event, presented in a pageant style, is meant as a fundraiser for TNC, and has honored friends of TNC, patrons of the arts, and, in 2006, the City of New Orleans. TNC donated a portion of the proceeds raised from this Benefit to Southern Rep, a theater company in New Orleans whose space was destroyed in the floods resulting from Hurricane Katrina. This event often features a star-studded lineup of performers; it has been hosted by Charles Busch and Julie Halston, and performers have included Kitty Carlisle Hart, Elaine Stritch, Patricia Neal, Tammy Grimes, F. Murray Abraham, Eli Wallach and Anne Jackson. The 2008 benefit honored playwright Edward Albee and included performances by Elaine Stritch, Marian Seldes, Basil Twist and Bill Irwin. The 2009 benefit honored Elaine Stritch and in 2010, Eli Wallach and Anne Jackson were honored. In 2012, TNC honored the 100th birthday of Bel Kaufman. The benefit in 2013 will honor Charles Busch.

TNC is featured in the 2007 Academy Award-nominated film The Savages.

TNC announced in January 2013 that the mortgage on their space at 155 1st Avenue, which had begun in 1987 at $717,000, had been retired, 5 years ahead of schedule, thanks to a two-year "Burn The Mortgage" campaign that included widespread support from individual donors and independent foundations. This ensures TNC will remain a permanent fixture on the landscape of Theater in New York City.

== Programs ==
Through its Resident Theater Program, TNC produces 20-30 new American plays per year, providing a forum for both new and mid-career writers to experiment with their work and develop as artists. For newer writers, TNC offers an Emerging Theater Program that commissions and produces 10 plays by fledgling writers each year. The newest division of the Resident Theater Program, New City, New Blood, is a reading series for worthy plays in earlier stages of development. Scratch Night at TNC (works-in-progress) is a new program that invites artists to try out their ideas in front of an audience at any stage of development.

The Annual Summer Street Theater Tour is a free operetta-for-the-streets that tours 13 locations in all 5 boroughs of New York City. Begun in the early 1970s and embodying the grassroots ideals of that decade, Street Theater aims to raise social awareness in the communities it performs in, creating civic dialogue that inspires a better understanding of the world beyond the communities' geographic boundaries. Written and directed by Crystal Field, TNC's Street Theater features a company of 50 and performs on Weekends in Parks, Playgrounds, Closed-off streets and the like. In 1983, a spokesman for the New York City Department of Cultural Affairs praised the theater's work as "a very valuable asset for the people of this city."

The Presenting Theater Program is TNC's vehicle to providing a showcase for performing groups without a permanent base. Each winter, the Presenting Program hosts Bread & Puppet Theater, the oldest continuing experimental theater company in America and the Thunderbird American Indian Dance Concert and pow-wow, which offers ritual and social dances from 17 tribes throughout the United States.

TNC's Arts in Education program was developed specifically to foster communication and self-esteem in at-risk and limited English proficient students. It has served P.S. 20, JHS 64, the Regents Family Shelter and the Catherine Street Shelter, and currently consists of a free After School Theater Workshop for low-income Lower East Side children.

The Community Festival Program consists of two free annual events, the Village Halloween Costume Ball and the Lower East Side Festival of the Arts. The Halloween Ball showcases over 450 artists and performers at a multi-level theatrical event, with performances that spill out onto the street. The Lower East Side Festival of the Arts is a free three-day weekend long extravaganza celebrating the cultural and artistic diversity of the Lower East Side. This event has grown tenfold since its inception in 1996, and is currently attended by over 3,000 people annually.

TNC's Art Gallery grew out of the annual art exhibit for the Lower East Side Festival of the Arts, and is now a year-round program of curated shows.

Theater for the New City's annual summer performance festival known as Dream Up Festival started in 2010. The festival is dedicated to new works and performances run in August and September. Theater for the New City is looking for the best writing and or most original concepts to present to New York City.

== Facility ==
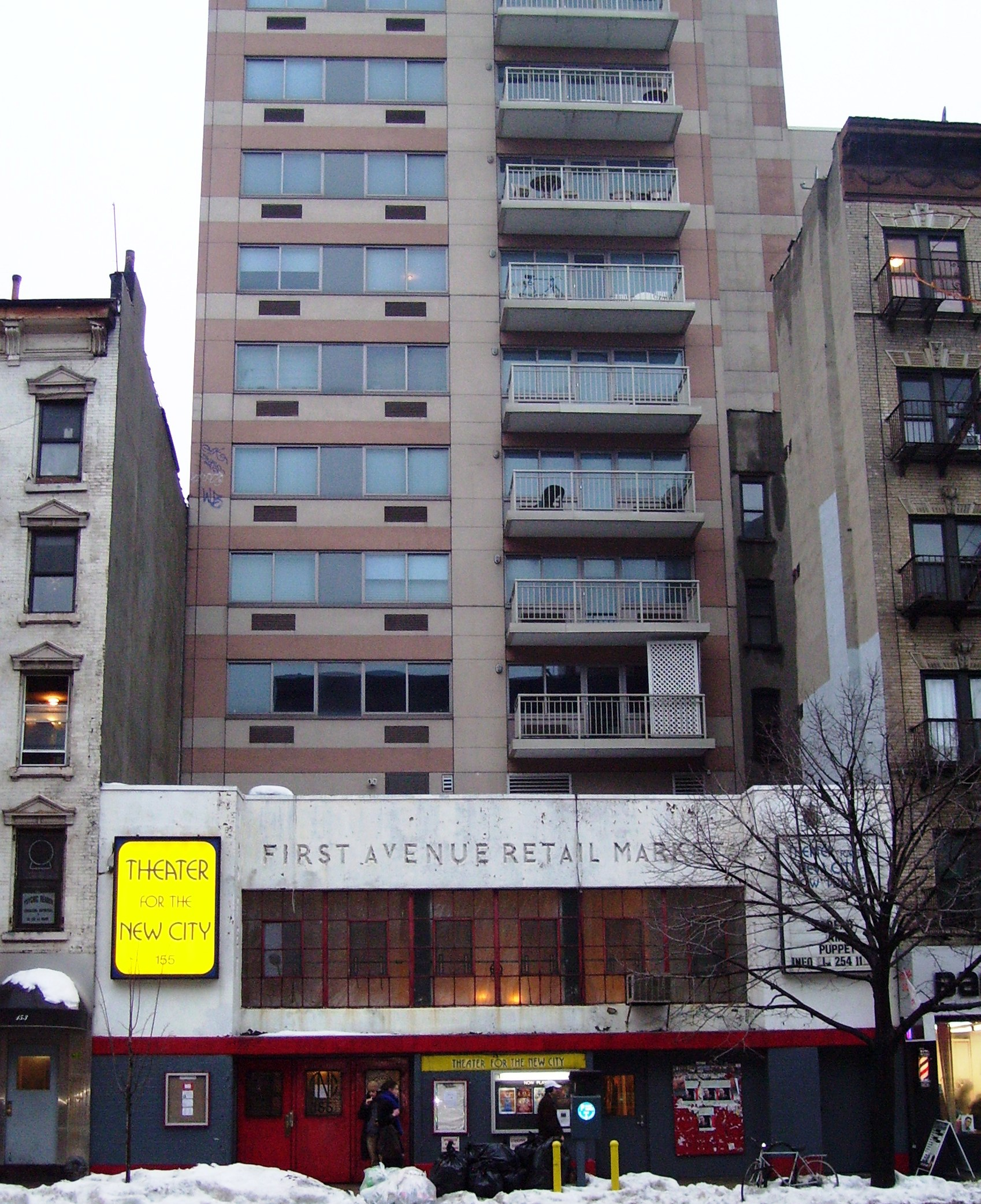
Part of the 12-story condominium tower, the New Theater Building, behind the theater

TNC's permanent home is the former First Avenue Retail Market created in 1938 by Fiorello LaGuardia to take pushcart peddlers off the streets. TNC purchased the building in 1986, but to its later regret, was not able to purchase the air rights above the one-story facility. After moving into the space in September 1986. it created two interim theaters to continue production while raising the $2 million needed for renovation funds. The building currently consists of four theaters:

=== Seward and Joyce Johnson Theater ===
The Seward and Joyce Johnson Theater was the first theater to finish renovation in 1991. Funding for the theater was provided by sculptor John Seward Johnson II of the Johnson and Johnson family, and his wife Joyce. Johnson designed and created the silver archway into the theater. One of the largest theaters off-off-Broadway, and the only space that can be used as a 99-seat off-off-Broadway theater or be transformed into a 240-seat off-Broadway theater, the Johnson Theater opened in 1991 with Grandchild of Kings by Hal Prince. The theater is used for large-scale productions, including the annual Bread & Puppet nativity during the holiday season and an annual pow-wow coordinated by the Thunderbird American Indian Dancers.

=== Cino Theater ===
The Cino Theater is named after Joe Cino and is the third space in TNC's history to bear Cino's name. A long and shallow theater with 74 seats, the Cino Theater is TNC's most modifiable space, and has been at times arranged as a thrust stage and an arena stage. The Cino Theater is slated for a full renovation in the near future, which will include leveling of the floor, fully-moveable seating and a balcony performance area.

=== Cabaret Theater ===
The Cabaret Theater was renovated along with TNC's basement in 1959 and at 65 seats is TNC's smallest theater. An ersatz-Black Box type space, one-person plays and late-night cabarets often use this space, which as The Womb Room during the Annual Halloween Ball, showcases work by new performance artists and musicians.

=== Community Space Theater ===
The Community Space Theater was the last theater to be renovated in 2001. It has 91 seats and a sprung wood dance floor. Initially, this space consisted of risers and a stage concealed from the lobby by a heavy black curtain. During the renovation of 2001, an outer wall was added, and a formal dressing room was created as well.

=== Lobby Space and basement ===
TNC's Lobby Space is used as an Art Gallery year-round, and also contains a small concession stand which is open during performances. TNC's Basement houses the Theater's vast collection of Costumes and Props.

== Controversy ==
The renovation of Theater for the New City came at a great cost to its relationship with the community in 2000 when Mayor Rudolph Giuliani sold the air rights above the theater (which the city had retained) to a developer. TNC was at that time in default of a loan borrowed against a pledged grant from the Manhattan Borough President's Office, which never materialized. The City put a lien against TNC in 1997 and unable to find a major donor to pay off the $519,634 lien, TNC was forced to agree to the construction of a 12-story tower above their space in order to have the lien forgiven. The deal included an extension on the theater's mortgage and gave the theater a seat on the condo's board. Being taller than the 6-story tenement buildings prevalent on the Lower East Side, the condo tower was seen as a threat to the character of the neighborhood and construction in 2000 took place amidst protest. The tower became even more of a controversy when the developer hired non-union workers to build the tower.
