= George Bartenieff =

American actor (1933–2022)

- Born: George Michael Bartenieff; January 24, 1933; Berlin, Weimar Republic
- Died: July 30, 2022 (aged 89); New York City, U.S.
- Citizenship: American
- Occupations: Stage and film actor
- Years active: 1964–2022
- Spouse: Karen Malpede

George Michael Bartenieff (January 24, 1933 – July 30, 2022) was an American stage and film actor. He was noted both for his character roles in commercial and non-commercial films and on television, and for his work in the avant-garde theatre and performance world of downtown Manhattan, New York City in the 1960s and 1970s. He was a co-founder of the Theatre for the New City, and of the Greenwich Village Halloween Parade.

Bartenieff appeared in nine shows on Broadway, in 19 productions Off-Broadway, in 18 films, and in 21 television episodes for 14 different programs. He was the recipient of two Obie Awards and a Drama Desk Award.

Bartenieff also taught at the City University of New York, and in a high school in the Bedford-Stuyvesant neighborhood of Brooklyn.

== Life and career ==
Bartenieff was born in Berlin, then in Weimar Republic, the son of dancer parents, Irmgard (Prim) and Michael Bartenieff. His parents were Jewish, and left for the U.S. with the rise of the Nazis, settling in Pittsfield, Massachusetts. Bartenieff and his brother Igor lived with his mother's relatives in the Bavarian mountains, before joining their parents in the U.S. He made his stage debut at the age of 14 in the 1947 Broadway theatre production The Whole World Over, directed by Harold Clurman. After appearing in a few shows on Broadway, Bartenieff went to London for training at the Royal Academy of Dramatic Arts, where he "fell in love" with the works of Shakespeare. His intention at the time was to be a classical actor, and his hero was Laurence Olivier.

When Bartenieff returned to the United States, he worked with Andre Gregory's Theatre for the Living Arts in Philadelphia. For a number of years in the 1960s, Bartenieff worked with Gregory in Philadelphia, on Broadway, for Joe Papp's New York Shakespeare Festival, and in "cross-disciplinary" showcases at the Judson Poets Theatre at the Judson Church in Greenwich Village.

Bartenieff also began to do "street theatre" at this time. One production, with writer/carpenter/landscape artist Bib Nichols, protested against the Lower Manhattan Expressway which Robert Moses wanted to build across the island. Their production played in the street in the neighborhoods which would be affected by the highway, Little Italy and the West Village; the set was constructed in such a way that if a car came by, it would break apart to allow the vehicle to proceed.

In 1970, feeling that the Judson Poets Theatre had passed its peak, four artists involved in it – Bartenieff, his wife at the time, dancer Crystal Field, director Larry Kornfield, and Theo Barnes – wanted to start their own "cross-disciplinary theater which emphasized poetic language", according to Bartenieff. The Westbeth Artists Community had just started at the time, and a large space appropriate for performance became available in the complex. This was the beginning of Theatre for the New City, which still exists, albeit in other quarters. TNC not only did their own work, they invited other companies, such as Mabou Mines, the Talking Band, and Richard Foreman's company, to perform there. They also mounted street theatre productions, with the purpose of making "the theater part of the community, and the community part of the theater."

Bartenieff stayed with Theatre for the New City for 24 years – performing, directing or producing more than 900 new American plays – but left when he began to feel he was spending more time on the financial problems of the company than he was on his craft. "I had to return," said Bartenieff, "to my own work, from being the Cecil B. DeMille of off-off-Broadway to the idea that small is more." To this end, he collaborated with his wife, playwright and director Karen Malpede, to create a one-man show, I Will Bear Witness, an adaptation of the memoirs of Victor Klemperer, which documented daily life as a Jewish professor in Nazi Germany. This production was the beginning of Bartenieff and Malpede's Theater Three Collaborative, which as of 2012 was 17 years old.

Bartenieff died in New York City on July 30, 2022, at the age of 89.

== Stage productions ==
=== Broadway ===
- The Whole World Over (1947, Biltmore Theatre, 0 previews, 100 performances) – featuring Uta Hagen and Sanford Meisner, directed by Harold Clurman
- Montserrat (1949, Fulton Theatre, 0 prev. 65 perfs.) – by Lillian Hellman
- The Moon Besieged (1962, Lyceum Theatre, 2 prev., 1 perf.)
- The Changeling (1964, understudy, ANTA Washington Square Theatre, 0 prev., 32 perfs.) – directed by Elia Kazan
- Venus Is (1966, Billy Rose Theatre, 7 prev., 0 perfs.)
- "Box" / "Quotations From Chairman Mao Tse-Tung" (1968, Billy Rose Theatre, 4 prev., 12 perf., in rep with production below) – two one-act plays by Edward Albee
- "The Death of Bessie Smith" / "The American Dream" (1968, Billy Rose Theatre, 0 prev., 12 perf.) – two one-act plays by Edward Albee
- Cop-Out (1969, Cort Theatre, 12 prev., 8 perfs.) – by John Guare
- Unlikely Heroes: "Defender of the Faith" / "Epstein" / "Eli, the Fanatic" (1971, Plymouth Theatre, 9 prev., 23 perfs.) – three one-act plays based on stories by Philip Roth

=== Off-Broadway ===
- The Brig – The Living Theatre (1963)
- "Home Movies" / "Softly Consider the Nearness" – Provincetown Playhouse (1964) – two one-act plays by Rosalyn Drexler and Al Carmines
- "Krapp's Last Tape" / "The Zoo Story" – Cherry Lane Theatre (1965) – by Samuel Beckett ("Krapp") and Edward Albee ("Zoo"), directed by Alan Schneider
- "Walking to Waldheim" / "Happiness" – Mitzi E. Newhouse Theater at Lincoln Center (1967) – two one-act plays by Mayo Simon
- The Memorandum – Joseph Papp Public Theater – Anspacher Theater (1968) – by Václav Havel
- The Increased Difficulty of Concentration – Mitzi E. Newhouse Theater at Lincoln Center (1969) – by Václav Havel
- Room Service – Edison Theatre (1970)
- Trelawny of the "Wells" – Joseph Papp Public Theater – Anspacher Theater (1970–71) – by Arthur Wing Pinero
- Dead End Kids – Joseph Papp Public Theater – Susan Stein Shiva Theater (1980–81) – by JoAnne Akalaitis, a Mabou Mines production
- American Notes – Joseph Papp Public Theater – Susan Stein Shiva Theater (1988) – directed by JoAnne Akalaitis
- Cymbeline – Joseph Papp Public Theater – Newman Theater (1989) – by William Shakespeare, directed by JoAnne Akalaitis, music by Philip Glass
- Sabina – Primary Stages (1996) – by Willy Holtzman
- Misalliance – Roundabout Theatre Company – Laura Pels Theatre (1997) – by George Bernard Shaw
- World of Mirth – Theatre Four (2001)
- Stuff Happens – Joseph Papp Public Theater – Newman Theater (2006) – by David Hare
- Prometheus Bound – East 13th Street/CSC Theatre (2007)
- Romeo and Juliet – Delacorte Theater at Lincoln Center (2007) – by William Shakespeare, directed by Michael Greif
- Edward Albee's The American Dream and The Sandbox – Cherry Lane Theatre (2008) – two one-act plays by Edward Albee
- The Bacchae – Delacorte Theater at Lincoln Center (2009) – by Euripides, music by Philip Glass

== Filmography ==
=== Film ===
Year	Title	Role	Notes
1964	The Brig	Prisoner	
1965	The Double Barreled Detective Story	Undetermined role	
1966	Zero in the Universe	Steinmetz	
1970	Hercules in New York	Nitro	
1972	The Hot Rock	Museum Guard #2	
1977	Big Thumbs	Undetermined role	
1981	Strong Medicine	Undetermined role	
1986	Dead End Kids	Undetermined role	
1988	The Laser Man	Haven	
1989	American Stories: Food, Family and Philosophy	Undetermined role	
1989	See No Evil, Hear No Evil	Huddelston	
1989	Cookie	Andy O'Brien	
1993	Joey Breaker	Dean Milford	
1996	On Seventh Avenue	Moe Bick	TV film
1997	Anima	Sam	
2009	Julie & Julia	Chef Max Bugnard	
2012	The Dictator	Romanian Accountant	
2018	A Scientist's Guide to Living and Dying	Watts	

=== Television ===
Year	Title	Role	Notes
1971	Great Performances		Episode: "Paradise Lost"
1987	At Mother's Request	Mr. Coles	Mini-series
1987	Crime Story	Dr. Friedrich Gantman	Episode: "Atomic Fallout"
1994	Law & Order	Jerome	Episode: "Mayhem"
1995	Law & Order	Judge Shawn MacNamara	3 episodes
1995	New York Undercover	Mr. Leferts	Episode: "Student Affairs"
1998	From the Earth to the Moon	Hugh Dryden	Episode: "Can We Do This?"
1999	Law & Order	Presiding Judge	Episode: "Gunshow"
2002	Law & Order: Criminal Intent	John Nemetz	Episode: "Maledictus"
2003	American Masters	Danforth	Episode: "None Without Sin"
2004	Law & Order	Stefan Anders	Episode: "Evil Breeds"
2004	Rescue Me	Mel	Episode: "Leaving"
2006	Conviction	Judge Nelson Beckman	Episode: "Indiscretion"
2007	American Masters	Dr. Adler	Episode: "Novel Reflections: The American Dream"
2009	30 Rock	Douglas Templeton	Episode: "Flu Shot"
2011	Curb Your Enthusiasm	Judge Horn	Episode: "Car Periscope"
2013	Elementary	Jurgi	Episode: "Possibility Two"
2013	Zero Hour	Old Man Kipske	Episode: "Chain"
2016	The Blacklist	Man on the Beach	Episode: "Cape May"
2019	Ray Donovan	Gerald Moskovitz	Episode: "The Transfer Agent"

== Awards and honors ==
In 1977, Theatre for the New City, of which Bartenieff was then co-director, won a Special Citation Obie Award for Sustained Excellence. Personally, Bartenieff won a 2001 Obie for his performance in his one-act play, I Will Bear Witness and a 2006 Drama Desk Award for his performance in Stuff Happens.
