= Stark Sands =

American actor

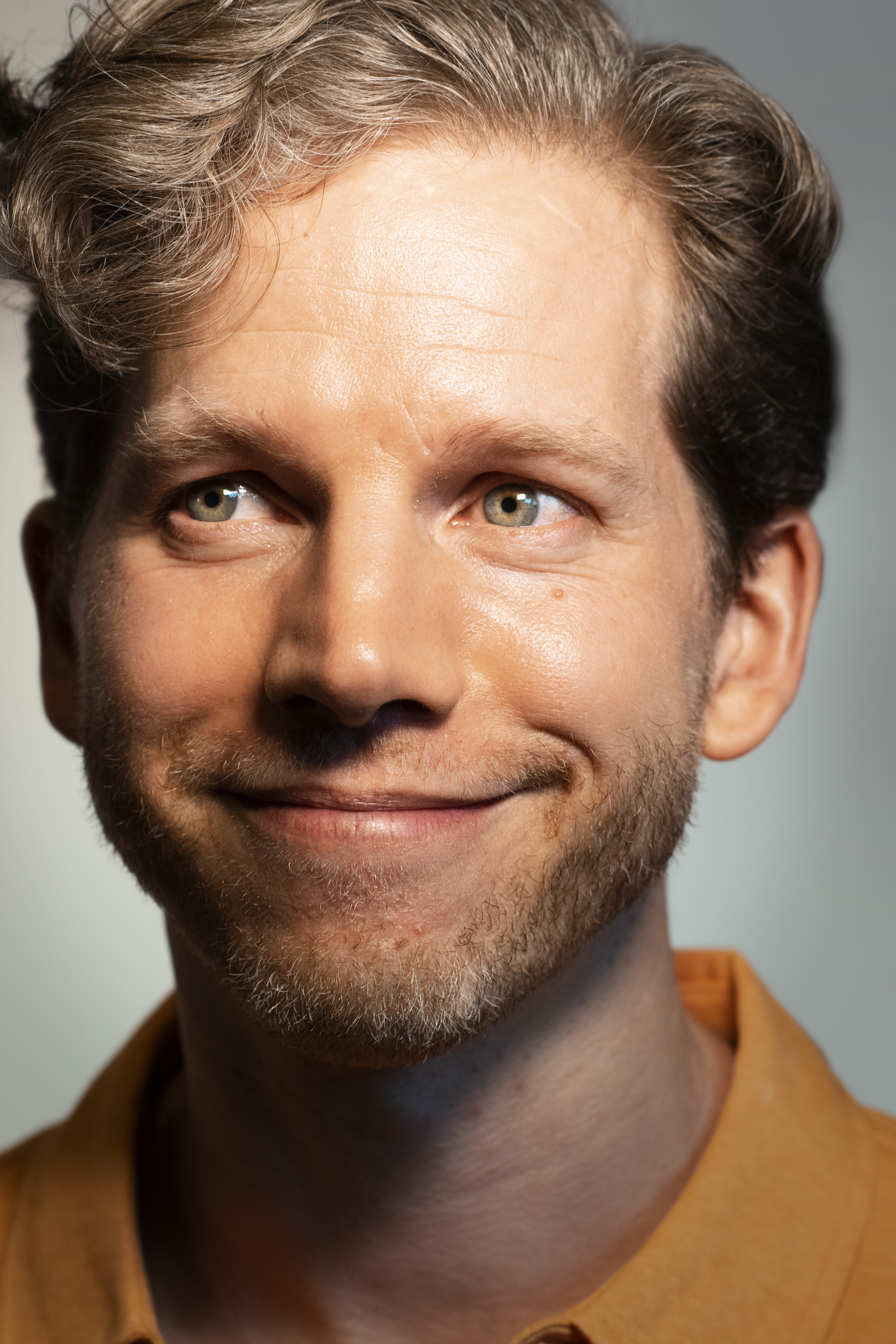
- Sands in 2022
- Born: Stark Bunker Sands; September 30, 1978 (age 47); Dallas, Texas, U.S.
- Education: University of Southern California
- Occupation: Actor
- Years active: 2002–present
- Spouse: Gemma Clarke (m. 2011)
- Children: 2

Stark Sands (born September 30, 1978) is an American actor. He is known for his role as Tunny in the original Broadway cast of American Idiot, and originating the role of Charlie Price in Kinky Boots on Broadway. He is a two-time Tony Award nominee. He is also known for the roles of Lance Sussman in Die, Mommie, Die! and Lt. Nathaniel Fick in Generation Kill. He starred as Dash Parker in FOX's series Minority Report.

== Early life and education ==
Sands was born Stark Bunker Sands in Dallas, Texas. Stark is his mother's maiden name, and Bunker was his late father's middle name, as well as his maternal great-grandmother's maiden name. He has a fraternal twin brother, Jacob, and an older sister. Sands attended Highland Park High School, and went on to gain his BFA in acting from the University of Southern California (class of 2001).

== Career ==
In 2002, Sands played Toby, a recurring love interest to the angst-ridden teen, Claire Fisher (played by Lauren Ambrose), on the HBO television series Six Feet Under (2001–2005) and co-starred in Me and Daphne (2002), a short film directed by Rebecca Gayheart and produced by Brett Ratner. He has also co-starred in the independent film Pack of Dogs (2002), directed by Ian Kessner.

Sands made his feature-film debut opposite Natasha Lyonne and Jason Priestley in Die, Mommie, Die! (2003), an adaptation of Charles Busch's play of the same name. He also appeared in the films Chasing Liberty (2004), with Mandy Moore, as well as Shall We Dance (2004), with Richard Gere and Jennifer Lopez.

In 2007, he received a nomination for a Tony Award for Best Featured Actor in a Play for his role in the Broadway revival of Journey's End.

From May 2 to June 8, 2008, he performed the role of Alex in A Seagull in the Hamptons at the McCarter Theatre in Princeton, New Jersey, alongside Morena Baccarin.

Sands also participated in the seven-episode HBO miniseries Generation Kill about the 2003 Iraq invasion, airing during the summer of 2008. In the miniseries he played Marine Lt. Nathaniel Fick. Sands previously played a U.S. Marine, Walter Gust, in Flags of Our Fathers.

Additional theater credits include the 2009 musical adaptation of Bonnie & Clyde at the La Jolla Playhouse, The Classic Stage Company's production of The Tempest which earned him the Actors' Equity Foundation's St. Clair Bayfield Award, which honors the best performance by an actor in a Shakespearean play in the New York metropolitan area. From June 25 to July 12, 2009, Sands appeared in the Shakespeare in the Park's production of Twelfth Night, featuring Anne Hathaway, Audra McDonald and Raul Esparza.

Sands played the role of Tunny in the Broadway production of American Idiot, again playing a member of the military. He left the production on March 13, 2011; David Larsen took over the role.

Sands was in the 2010 HBO pilot The Miraculous Year, which was not picked up by HBO. He was part of the main cast of the CBS television series Rookies. The show was picked up for mid-season, under the new name NYC 22, but was canceled after airing 13 episodes due to inadequate ratings.

Sands played the character of Troy Nelson in the film Inside Llewyn Davis (2013).

Sands played one of the lead characters, Charlie Price, in the musical Kinky Boots which opened at the Bank of America Theatre in Chicago, Illinois, for a four-week run in October 2012. He reprised his role when the show premiered on Broadway at the Al Hirschfeld Theatre on April 4, 2013, with previews beginning on March 3, 2013. For his role as Charlie, Sands was nominated for a Tony Award for Best Actor in a Musical, but lost to his co-star Billy Porter. He played his final performance on January 26, 2014.

In 2014, Sands was cast in the NBC pilot Salvation. This was not picked up to series. Sands was cast in FOX's pilot, Minority Report, as Dash, a precog. The series premiered on September 21, 2015.

In 2016, Sands played the Templar in Classic Stage Company's production of Nathan the Wise off-Broadway.

Sands and his original co-star Porter returned to the Broadway production of Kinky Boots for a limited 15 week run, starting on September 26, 2017. He also appeared in Steven Spielberg's 2017 drama film The Post.

In 2019, Sands was cast in the musical Swept Away as Big Brother. The production was originally announced to premiere in June, 2020, however it was postponed due to the COVID-19 pandemic. Swept Away premiered at the Berkeley Repertory Theatre in Berkeley, California on January 9, 2022 and had its final show on March 13, 2022.

In 2022, Sands was cast in the North American tryout of & Juliet as William Shakespeare, transferring from the West End. The production opened in Toronto, Canada in the Princess of Wales Theatre on June 22, 2022, and ended on August 14, 2022. & Juliet moved to Broadway in the 2022-23 season into the Stephen Sondheim Theatre with Sands reprising his role. Previews began on October 28, 2022, and opening night was on November 17, 2022. He played his final performance on August 6, 2023.

Sands reprised his role in Swept Away when it had a run at Arena Stage in Washington D.C. Previews began on November 25, 2023. Opening night was on December 6, 2023, and it played through January 14, 2024. On May 17, 2024 it was announced that Swept Away would move to Broadway in the fall of 2024, and that the main four cast members, including Sands, would reprise their roles.

== Personal life ==
On July 9, 2011, Sands married British journalist Gemma Clarke at Bovey Castle, England. They met while Sands was vacationing in London. They have a son born in 2015 and a daughter born in 2018.

== Filmography ==
Film
| Year | Title | Role | Notes |
|---|---|---|---|
| 2002 | Me and Daphne | Brother | Short film |
| 2002 | Pack of Dogs | David | Short film |
| 2003 | Die, Mommie, Die! | Lance Sussman | |
| 2003 | 11:14 | Tim | |
| 2004 | Chasing Liberty | Grant Hillman | |
| 2004 | Catch That Kid | Chad | |
| 2004 | Shall We Dance? | Evan Clark | |
| 2005 | Pretty Persuasion | Troy | |
| 2006 | Jack Rabbit | David | Short film |
| 2006 | Flags of our Fathers | Walter Gust | |
| 2008 | Day of the Dead | Bud Crain | |
| 2008 | My Sassy Girl | Soldier | |
| 2013 | Broadway Idiot | Himself | Documentary about the making of American Idiot |
| 2013 | Inside Llewyn Davis | Troy Nelson | Soundtrack: "The Last Thing on My Mind", "Five Hundred Miles" |
| 2017 | The Post | Don Graham | |

Television
| Year | Title | Role | Notes |
|---|---|---|---|
| 2002 | Six Feet Under | Toby | Recurring; 2 episodes |
| 2003 | Lost at Home | Will Davis | Main |
| 2004–2005 | Hope & Faith | Henry | Recurring; 3 episodes |
| 2006 | Family Guy | Justin Hackeysack | Voice; episode: "You May Now Kiss the... Uh... Guy Who Receives" |
| 2006 | Nip/Tuck | Conor McNamara – 2026 | Episode: "Conor McNamara, 2026" |
| 2006–2007 | American Dad! | Tino / Williams / Conservative #1 | Voice; 2 episodes |
| 2008 | Generation Kill | Nathaniel Fick | Miniseries |
| 2010 | The Miraculous Year | Duke Ellis | Unsold pilot |
| 2012 | NYC 22 | Kenny McLaren | Main |
| 2014 | Salvation | Paul | Unsold pilot |
| 2015 | Minority Report | Dash Parker | Main |
| 2020 | Law & Order: Special Victims Unit | Bobby Frost | Episode: "Swimming with the Sharks" |

== Theatre ==
| Year | Title | Genre | Role | Theatre | Location | Notes |
|---|---|---|---|---|---|---|
| 2007 | Journey's End | Drama | 2nd Lt. Raleigh | Belasco Theatre | New York City, New York | Revival |
| 2008 | A Seagull in the Hamptons | Drama | Alex | McCarter Theatre | Princeton, New Jersey | |
| 2009 | Bonnie & Clyde | Musical | Clyde Barrow | La Jolla Playhouse | San Diego, California | Originated role |
| 2009 | The Tempest | Comedy | Ferdinand | CSC Theatre | New York City, New York | |
| 2009 | Twelfth Night | Comedy | Sebastian | Delacorte Theatre | New York City, New York | |
| 2010–2011 | American Idiot | Musical | Tunny | St. James Theatre | New York City, New York | |
| 2012–2014 | Kinky Boots | Musical | Charlie Price | Bank of America Theatre | Chicago, Illinois | Originated role |
| 2012–2014 | Kinky Boots | Musical | Charlie Price | Al Hirschfeld Theatre | New York City, New York | Originated role |
| 2016 | Nathan the Wise | Drama | Templar | CSC Theatre | New York City, New York | |
| 2017–2018 | Kinky Boots | Musical | Charlie Price | Al Hirschfeld Theatre | New York City, New York | |
| 2018 | To Kill a Mockingbird | Drama | Horace Gilmer | Shubert Theatre | New York City, New York | Originated role |
| 2022 | Swept Away | Musical | Big Brother | Berkeley Repertory Theatre | Berkeley, California | Originated role |
| 2022-2023 | & Juliet | Musical | William Shakespeare | Princess of Wales Theatre | Toronto, Canada | North American premiere |
| 2022-2023 | & Juliet | Musical | William Shakespeare | Stephen Sondheim Theatre | New York City, New York | |
| 2023 | Swept Away | Musical | Big Brother | Arena Stage | Washington, D.C. | |
| 2024 | Swept Away | Musical | Big Brother | Longacre Theatre | New York City, New York | |

=== Awards ===
List of awards and nominations
| Year | Award | Category | Result | Title |
|---|---|---|---|---|
| 2007 | Tony Award | Best Featured Actor in a Play | Nominated | Journey's End |
| 2007 | Theatre World Award | Outstanding New York City Stage Debut Performance | Won | Journey's End |
| 2009 | Bayfield Award | Best Performance by an Actor in a Shakespearean Play in the New York Metropolitan Area | Won | The Tempest |
| 2010 | Broadway.com Audience Award | Favorite Featured Actor in a Broadway Musical | Nominated | American Idiot |
| 2013 | Tony Award | Best Actor in a Musical | Nominated | Kinky Boots |
| 2013 | Grammy Award | Grammy Award for Best Musical Theater Album | Won | Kinky Boots |

== See also ==
- List of Broadway musicals stars
- List of people from Dallas
- List of people from New York City
