= Karen Malpede =

American playwright and director

- Born: Wichita Falls, Texas
- Education: University of Wisconsin; Columbia University School of the Arts
- Spouse: George Bartenieff
- Writing career
- Genre: Social justice art
- Website: theaterthreecollaborative.org

Karen Malpede is an American playwright and director whose work reflects an ongoing interest in social justice issues. She is a co-founder of the Theater Three Collaborative in New York City, and teaches theater and environmental justice at the John Jay College of Criminal Justice. She is also the editor of the notable anthology, Women in Theater: Compassion and Hope (1984).

== Early life ==
Karen Malpede was born, a fraternal twin, in 1945, on Sheppard Air Force Base, in Wichita Falls, TX, to a Jewish mother and an Italian-American father. Both of her parents were from Chicago, and she and her brother were raised on Chicago's North Shore, in Evanston and Wilmette, IL.

She graduated from New Trier Township High School in Winnetka, IL. She earned a Bachelor of Science degree with Honors at the University of Wisconsin and a Master of Fine Arts degree in Theater at the Columbia University School of the Arts.

She holds a Clinical Training Certificate from the International Trauma Studies Program, and for many years was a member of Robert Jay Lifton's Center on Violence and Human Survival.

== Career ==
=== Playwright ===
Because of her dual background, Malpede has said, she never quite fit in with any one group, and that has had a freeing effect on her as a dramatist.

Malpede's first play, A Lament for Three Women, was published in A Century of Plays by American Women, edited by Rachel France. (Richards Rosen Press, 1979). and she has been writing and producing plays ever since.

She was a cofounder of the Women's Salon for Literature, a monthly event featuring the leading writers of the feminist movement, and where her second play Rebecca received its first public reading, and has had 22 plays produced as of 2020.

Prophecy, produced in 2008 in London and 2010 in New York, starring Kathleen Chalfant, is a memory play about an enduring but tumultuous marriage, marked by significant infidelities, and of the acting teacher whose life was impacted by the murder of an antiwar lover, by his commanding officer, in Vietnam and now by a talented Iraq-war veteran student who takes his own life (written and produced at a time when little attention was being paid to veteran suicides).

Another Life is a surreal yet factual critique of the U.S. government torture program, starring a mogul named Handel, who prefigures and bears striking resemblance to Donald J. Trump. Premiered on September 11, 2011, to commemorate the decade since the attacks of September 2001, the play had four subsequent productions. Each production was accompanied by a Festival of Conscience, in which major writers on torture and lawyers for Guantanamo detainees, held conversations with the audiences.

Her next play Extreme Whether, depicts the struggle of scientists to tell the truth about climate change in the face of opposition from the fossil fuel industry. The play, which premiered at Theater for the New City in New York in 2014, was also presented as a staged reading in French and English as part of ArtCop21, in Paris, 2015, during the negotiation of the Paris Climate Agreement, and restaged in 2018 at La MaMa Experimental Theater Club in New York City Prominent climate scientists, James Hansen and Jennifer Francis and environmental activists spoke with the audience after the production.

Her most recently produced play Other Than We, is a utopic-dystopic cli-fi fantasy. Produced at LaMama in November 2019, it was live streamed by the Columbia Earth Institute in the summer of 2020, and is published by Laertes Books.

Malpede's one-man play, I Will Bear Witness, is co-adapted with George Bartenieff from the diaries of Victor Klemperer, a German Jew who documented the persecution of Jews in Dresden between 1933 and 1945. The production, which she directed, won Obie Awards for acting for Bartenieff and set design.

In May, 2021, Theater Three Collaborative will present the world premiere of Malpede's play Blue Valiant, outdoors at Farm Arts Collective, among the first American theaters to come out of pandemic lockdown with a live performance. Blue Valiant was written for and stars Kathleen Chalfant and George Bartenieff, with Millie Ortiz and Arthur Rosen playing the horse on piano. The play is about grief and renewal.

=== Artistic Director ===
In 1977, Malpede co-founded New Cycle Theater, with Burl Hash, a free, loft theater in Park Slope, Brooklyn, which later became affiliated with the early Arts at St. Ann's. Her plays, “The End of War,” “Making Peace: A Fantasy,” “A Monster Has Stolen the Sun,” “Sappho & Aphrodite,” were produced in the loft theater and at St. Ann's.

In 1995, she co-founded the Theater Three Collaborative with her husband, George Bartenieff, and the late Lee Nagrin, both actors. The purpose was to enable them "to produce plays that could not be produced elsewhere" because of their social justice themes and poetic character-driven, sometimes, surreal, and epic styles.

Their premiere production in New York in 1995, and at the Dionysia Festival for Contemporary Drama in Veroli, Italy, was The Beekeeper’s Daughter, a play inspired both by the life of poet Robert Graves and by the plight of a victim of a Bosnian rape camp.

=== Books, stories, articles, and reviews ===
Her first book, People’s Theater in Amerika, a history of radical theater in the United States from 1929 to 1972, was a seminal study and brought her into contact with people who become mentors and early supporters of her plays, Joseph Chaikin, founder of the Open Theater, and Julian Beck and Judith Malina, co-founders of The Living Theatre, and lifelong friends.

Her second book, Three Works by the Open Theater, a collaboration with Chakin, published in 1974, was a seminal study of the influential, experimental theater company.

Malpede's short stories, reviews, and other writings on the torture program, climate change and feminism have been published in New Theatre Quarterly, the Women's Review of Books, the Kenyon Review, and other periodicals; and in anthologies such as Helen Barolini's The Dream Book: An Anthology of Writings by Italian American Women (1985) and Roberta Mock's Performing Processes (2000).

She has been awarded numerous grants and fellowships, and her productions are regularly reviewed in periodicals such as American Theatre and the New York Times

== Activism ==
Malpede is a lifelong peace and social justice activist. Among the historic marches and protests of which she has been a part: The 1967 March on the Pentagon, The 1970 New Haven Rally Protesting the Trial of Bobby Seale and Erica Huggins, The 1979, Washington Lawn Eleven, for which she was arrested, tried and found guilty, alongside writer Grace Paley, photographer Karl Bissinger and eight others. The Women's Peace Encampment at Seneca Falls and Women's Pentagon Action, and the summer 2020 Black Lives Matter marches on Dekalb Ave., Brooklyn, during the COVID-19 Pandemic.

In 2004, to protest the Iraq war, she co-created an outdoor public ritual to coincide with the Republican National Convention re-nominating George W. Bush. Called “Iraq: Naming the Dead” the event took place each night of the convention, outdoors, in the graveyard of the historic St. Mark's Church-in-the-Bowery, involving Arab-American, black, white and brown readers of the names of the Iraqi and American dead (a 15-to-1 ratio).

Several months later, she presented the rewritten and expanded indoor documentary-ritual theater performance piece “I raq:Speaking of War” at the CUNY Graduate Center Prozansky Auditorium, on the eve of a massive anti-war march in New York; the piece was later presented at the Culture Project.

In the summer of 2018, she joined with playwrights Naomi Wallace and Kia Corthron to co-produce at the Signature Theater on 42nd St., Imagine: Yemen, an evening of eight short plays about the war in Yemen.

She is currently at work on an international collaboration with Persona Theater, Athens, for the YouTube staging of her short play Troy Too about COVID-19, the Climate Crisis and Racism; the script will be published in the forthcoming Staging 21st Century Tragedies.

== Selected works ==
=== As author ===
- Blue Valiant (forthcoming 2021)
- Other Than We (2020)
- Plays in Time: The Beekeeper's Daughter, Prophecy, Another Life, Extreme Whether (2017)
- A Monster Has Stolen the Sun and Other Plays (1987)
- People’s Theater in Amerika (1972)

=== As editor ===
- Acts of War: Iraq and Afghanistan in Seven Plays (2011)
- Women in Theater: Compassion & Hope (1985)
- Three Works by the Open Theater (1974)

=== As anthology contributor ===
- She Persisted (forthcoming, 2021, Applause)
- Staging 21st Century Tragedies (forthcoming, 2021, Routledge)
- Duo! The Best Scenes for Two for the 21st Century (2009)
- One on One: The Best Women's Monologues for the 21st Century (2008)
- One on One: Best Men's Monologues for the 21st Century (2008)
- 110 Stories: New York Writes After September 11 (2002)
- Performing Processes (2000)
- Genocide, War and Human Survival (1996)
- Women on the Verge: Seven Avant-Garde Plays (1993)
- Angels of Power (1991)
- The Dream Book: An Anthology of Writings by Italian-American Women (1985)
- A Century of Plays by American Women (1979)

== Personal life ==
Malpede is the mother of a daughter, Carrie Sophia, and the grandmother of two.

Her twin brother, John Malpede, also a graduate of the University of Wisconsin-Madison, is the founder and artistic director of the Los Angeles Poverty Department (LAPD), a 30-year-old theater and arts group working with the residents of Skid Row.
