= Psycho Beach Party =

2000 film by Robert Lee King

- Theatrical release poster
- Directed by: Robert Lee King
- Written by: Charles Busch
- Based on: Psycho Beach Party; 1987 play by Charles Busch
- Produced by: Virginia Biddle; Jon Gerrans; Marcus Hu; Victor Syrmis
- Starring: Lauren Ambrose; Thomas Gibson; Nicholas Brendon; Charles Busch; Matt Keeslar; Andrew Levitas; Nick Cornish; Kathleen Robertson; Danni Wheeler; Amy Adams; Beth Broderick; Kimberley Davies
- Cinematography: Arturo Smith
- Edited by: Suzanne Hines
- Music by: Ben Vaughn
- Production companies: New Oz Productions; Red Horse Films
- Distributed by: Strand Releasing
- Release dates: 23 January 2000 (Sundance); 4 August 2000 (United States)
- Running time: 95 minutes
- Countries: United States; Australia
- Language: English
- Box office: $268,117

Psycho Beach Party is a 2000 comedy horror film directed by Robert Lee King and written by Charles Busch, based on Busch's 1987 off-Broadway play of the same name. It stars Lauren Ambrose, Thomas Gibson, Nicholas Brendon, Busch, Matt Keeslar, Andrew Levitas, Nick Cornish, Kathleen Robertson, Danni Wheeler, Amy Adams, Beth Broderick, and Kimberley Davies.

Psycho Beach Party is a parody of 1950s psychodramas, 1960s beach party films, and 1980s slasher films. Set in 1962, the film follows a Gidget-like teenage tomboy with multiple personalities who is suspected of being the serial killer responsible for the latest series of murders in Malibu, California.

== Plot ==
In 1962 Malibu Beach, Florence Forrest is a 16-year-old tomboy who, unlike other girls her age, expresses little interest in boys. Florence and her prudish and perfectionist widowed mother, Ruth, are hosting a Swedish exchange student named Lars. One night at the local drive-in theater, where Florence and several other youngsters are watching a horror film starring B-movie star Bettina Barnes, Florence's best friend Berdine finds a teenage girl murdered. The next day, Captain Monica Stark begins investigating the murder.

While at the beach with Berdine, Florence spots a group of surfers—Starcat, Yo Yo, Provoloney, T.J., and Junior. She tries to convince the boys to teach her how to surf, but they declare that surfing is a men's sport. Undeterred, Florence visits the beach shack of the Great Kanaka, the local "surf guru", and attempts to persuade him to teach her how to surf, but is rebuffed. Upon seeing the circles in Kanaka's shirt, Florence suddenly adopts an alter ego, a sexually aggressive, foul-mouthed dominatrix named Anne Bowman, which both unnerves and entrances Kanaka. Florence then blacks out with no memory of what happened.

The following day, Kanaka begins teaching Florence surfing lessons, and she is nicknamed "Chicklet" by the surfers. They find Junior's severed body parts scattered all over the beach. When Captain Stark arrives to question the group, Florence becomes worried that she might be responsible for the murders due to her multiple personalities and blackouts. The next day, the group is excited to find Bettina Barnes staying in a beach house where the Elkins family was murdered by their 10-year-old son Larry 15 years earlier.

At a slumber party hosted by Bettina, Florence and Starcat, who normally bicker, grow closer. T.J. is stabbed to death by an unseen black-gloved killer in the guest bathroom. When T.J.'s body is found, Captain Stark arrives to question everyone. A flashback reveals that Captain Stark and Kanaka used to be lovers before they broke up because she wanted to focus on her career. Captain Stark notices that each victim had a medical condition: the girl at the drive-in had a harelip, Junior suffered from psoriasis, and T.J. had a single testicle.

Florence, who is secretly smitten with Starcat, seeks advice from Kanaka on how to attract boys, whereupon Anne Bowman emerges before Florence adopts another alter ego, a stereotypical sassy black woman named Tylene. Meanwhile, Rhonda, a wheelchair-using mean girl, is killed by the black-gloved killer and later found decapitated. Later, Ruth is outraged to find Florence with Starcat and Kanaka at Kanaka's shack and vows to press charges.

One night, Florence attends a luau with the surfers and channels Anne Bowman. As Ruth arrives with the police, accusing Starcat and Kanaka of seducing her daughter, Starcat places Florence under hypnosis to determine the root cause of her split personality. Florence recalls a repressed memory from her childhood: one day, after being neglected by Ruth, who was seducing a sailor, Florence accidentally killed her younger brother Frankie while pushing him on a swing. Captain Stark has Ruth arrested for the murders, and Lars offers to drive Florence home.

On the drive, Lars brings up Florence's psychological problems and remarks that "there is so much ugliness in the world". Growing suspicious, Florence jumps out of the moving car and flees. Lars reveals himself to be Larry Elkins, who killed his family because of their disabilities. Florence climbs up a marquee to escape Larry while Starcat, Kanaka, and Berdine come to her rescue. As Larry threatens Florence with a knife, Captain Stark arrives and shoots Larry, who falls to his death. Florence and Starcat kiss.

As Florence awakens in a psychiatric hospital, it is revealed that the entire narrative has been a dream that she is having, and that she is the real killer. She is accompanied by three nurses—T.J., Junior, and Rhonda—who subject her to shock therapy. At the drive-in, a couple is watching a film based on Florence's life and complains about it all being a dream, before Florence appears and attacks them with a knife.

== Cast ==
- Lauren Ambrose as Florence "Chicklet" Forrest
- Thomas Gibson as Kanaka
- Nicholas Brendon as Starcat
- Kimberley Davies as Bettina Barnes
- Matt Keeslar as Lars/Larry
- Charles Busch as Captain Monica Stark
- Beth Broderick as Ruth Forrest
- Danni Wheeler as Berdine
- Nick Cornish as Yo Yo
- Andrew Levitas as Provoloney
- Amy Adams as Marvel Ann
- Kathleen Robertson as Rhonda
- Nathan Bexton as T.J.
- Buddy Quaid as Junior
- Jenica Bergere as Cookie
- Channon Roe as Wedge Riley
- David Chokachi as Eddie
- Jolie Jenkins as Angie
- Charlie Finn as Pea Brain
- Nick D'Agosto as the counterman

== Play and productions ==
The play was originally titled Gidget Goes Psychotic, but the title was changed due to concerns about copyright. In the original 1987 production, Charles Busch played the role of Chicklet. Deciding that he might not be believable in the role of a 16-year-old girl ("while I can still manage, with the aid of a sympathetic cameraman, to play a sophisticated 25, 16 would be a stretch"), he added the character of Monica Stark to the film.

After over 20 years, the play had its premiere UK production by Vertigo Theatre Productions in Manchester in March 2011. The production returned in August 2012 at Sacha's Hotel Ballroom. A production was held in Australia at the Bondi Pavilion Theatre from November to December 2012; productions also ran in Melbourne (notably at the Midsumma Festival) in early 2013, receiving generally positive reviews.

The Essendon Theatre Company in Melbourne, Australia, held another production of Psycho Beach Party beginning in March 2021.

== Soundtrack ==
The original motion-picture soundtrack for Psycho Beach Party was released by Nettwerk Records under the Unforscene Music imprint on September 12, 2000.

1. Ben Vaughn – Main Title
2. Los Straitjackets – Tailspin
3. Ben Vaughn – Marvel Ann On The Prowl
4. Ben Vaughn – Wrestle
5. The Halibuts – Night Crawler
6. Ben Vaughn – Chicklet Meets Surfers
7. Ben Vaughn – Neenie's Famous Weenies
8. Hillbilly Soul Surfers – Cha-Wow-Wow
9. Ben Vaughn – Chicklet Learns To Surf
10. Four Piece Suit – Bombasteroid
11. Ben Vaughn – Chicklet Wipes Out
12. Ben Vaughn – Mournful Surfers
13. Ben Vaughn – Romantic Beach Scene
14. Ben Vaughn – Kanaka's Shack
15. The Fathoms – Overboard
16. Los Straitjackets – Tempest
17. Man Or Astro-Man? – Mermaid Love
18. Ben Vaughn – P-S-Y-C-H-O (Psycho) End Title

== Reception ==
On the review aggregator website Rotten Tomatoes, the film holds an approval rating of 59% based on 34 reviews, with an average rating of 6.2/10. Metacritic, which uses a weighted average, assigned the film a score of 42 out of 100, based on 18 critics, indicating "mixed or average" reviews.

In a positive review, Stephen Holden of The New York Times states that the film "accomplishes what no stage production could. By assiduously copying the look and sound of those '60s movies – the wriggling title sequences, the twangy surf music, and the gawky gee-whiz screen acting style – it definitively skewers the false innocence of American pop culture on the eve of the countercultural deluge. Most of the play's subversive humor has arrived on the screen intact." Los Angeles Times critic Kevin Thomas compared the film unfavorably to its source material, opining that it "has to be twice as funny a play as it is as a movie"; he further explains that "deliberate camp like this film presents a special challenge: It must generate and sustain a high level of energy or it will swiftly fall flat. The latter is too often the case here."

Praising the "strong women" of the film, Bob Graham of the San Francisco Chronicle also wrote that Busch (as Monica Stark) "captures the woman-alone-in-the-world toughness of the roles played by the stars he loves. It goes beyond camp. He is sincere." However, Graham reasoned that the film has "rough edges", despite conceding that "they probably work to this larky, cheeky picture's advantage". He subsequently notes, "In some instances, it's hard to tell the really bad acting from the intentionally bad acting." Dennis Lim of The Village Voice was negative, concluding that the film is an "awkward combination of garish set decoration and muffled humor" and that "the viewer is left to ponder the number of levels on which this counts as a pointless exercise—a parody of parodic movies, a deconstruction of transparent genres, [and] a self-negatingly knowing example of camp".

== Home media ==
The film was released unrated on Region 1 DVD on November 8, 2005, by Strand Releasing. The disc contains an audio commentary with director Robert Lee King and screenwriter Charles Busch, the theatrical trailer, and the music video of "Tempest" by the band Los Straitjackets.

A Blu-ray was released on August 18, 2015.

=== Censorship ===
The film runs for 95 minutes NTSC on its American DVD release, but the version that was submitted to the British Board of Film Classification (BBFC) runs 85 minutes. It was passed uncut with a 15 rating. suggesting that it may have been pre-cut by TLA Releasing before submission. Similarly, the version submitted by Magna Pacific to the Office of Film and Literature Classification in Australia in 2001 ran for 84 minutes. The film was rated M in Australia, indicating that the film may not have been cut due to concerns over material.
