= Ankles Aweigh =

- Original cast recording
- Music: Sammy Fain
- Lyrics: Dan Shapiro
- Book: Guy Bolton; Eddie Davis
- Productions: 1955 Broadway; 1989 Goodspeed Opera House revival

Ankles Aweigh is a musical with a book by Guy Bolton and Eddie Davis, lyrics by Dan Shapiro, and music by Sammy Fain. The plot involves Hollywood starlet Wynne, who secretly marries a Navy pilot while filming a movie in Sicily. She disguises herself as a sailor and stows away on his ship to grab a covert honeymoon. They get mixed up with an espionage ring.

The original Broadway production opened April 18, 1955, and ran for 176 performances, but lost money.

== Background and productions ==
By 1955, audiences had become accustomed to book musicals that seamlessly integrated dialogue scenes with musical numbers, so this throwback to vaudeville-style entertainment, complete with burlesque jokes, chorus girls, and impersonations of Marlene Dietrich and Zsa Zsa Gabor, "seemed a shockingly dated effort", according to Ken Mandelbaum. Rodgers and Hammerstein invested in the show but made no creative contributions. During rehearsals, lead comic Myron McCormick was replaced by Lew Parker, and Sonny Tufts was fired in New Haven. Jerome Robbins spent two weeks revamping the show in Boston. The Allmusic reviewer noted that "the show seemed like such a throwback" and was "dated".

The musical opened on Broadway at the Mark Hellinger Theatre on April 18, 1955, and closed on September 17, 1955, after 176 performances. The show was directed by Fred F. Finklehoffe and choreographed by Tony Charmoli, with a cast that featured real-life sisters Jane and Betty Kean as Wynne and Elsey, Mark Dawson as Bill, Gabriel Dell as Spud and Thelma Carpenter as featured singer Chipolata. The producers immediately posted a closing notice, but theatre owner Anthony Brady Farrell decided to keep the show running with his own financing. Broadway columnists Walter Winchell's and Ed Sullivan's glowing reports failed to generate much business, and when salaries were cut to keep losses to a minimum, most of the major players quit in protest. After struggling for five months, the show finally closed at a loss of $340,000, which was more than its initial investment.

The Goodspeed Opera House revived the musical with a new book by Charles Busch, who transformed it into a camp satire of 1950s movie musicals and an affectionate tribute to the genre. The musical ran at Goodspeed in September 1988.

== Synopsis ==
Act I

A Hollywood starlet, Wynne, is in Sicily with her sister Elsey to film her movie debut in a low-budget musical ("Italy"). She falls in love with U.S. Navy lieutenant Bill Kelley ("Nothing at All"). The two secretly marry, violating a clause in her contract. With the aid of her sister and two of her husband's service buddies, Dinky and Spud, Wynne disguises herself as a sailor ("Walk Like a Sailor") and stows away on Bill's ship, the U.S.S. Alamo, so that they can slip away for a honeymoon. When they reach Morocco, they run into Bill's jealous Moroccan ex-girlfriend, Lucia ("Headin' for the Bottom"), who is now the mistress of the leader of an espionage ring. As revenge, Lucia implicates him as a spy.

Act II

With the help of her sister and his buddies, Wynne and Bill eventually find a way to absolve him of the charges, he becomes a hero, and they live happily ever after ("Eleven O'Clock Song").

== Musical numbers ==
Act I

- "Italy" – Chorus
- "Old-Fashioned Mother" – Elsey and Wynne
- "Skip the Build-Up" – Elsey
- "Nothing at All" – Wynne and Bill
- "Skip the Build-up" (reprise) – Dinky
- "Walk Like a Sailor" – Wynne, Dinky, Spud, Girl, Elsey, Hank Brujes and Skeet Geunther
- "Headin' for the Bottom" – Chipolata, Girls and Patrons of night spot
- "Nothing Can Replace a Man" – Wynne and Boys
- "Here's to Dear Old Us" – Elsey, Dinky and Spud
- "His and Hers" – Wynne and Bill
- "La Festa" – Chorus

Act II

- "Ready Cash" – Chorus
- "Kiss Me and Kill Me with Love" – Wynne and Bill
- "Honeymoon" – Elsey and Girls
- "The Villain Always Gets It" – Chorus
- "The Code" – Joe's Henchmen
- "Walk Like a Sailor" (reprise) – Chorus
- "Eleven O'Clock Song" – Elsey and Wynne
- "Finale" – Company

== Reception ==
Reviews were mostly unfavorable, commenting that the show's old vaudeville style no longer worked in the post-Oklahoma! era. Brooks Atkinson of The New York Times wrote: "Imagine that nothing interesting has developed in the field of musical comedy for the last ten or fifteen years", and Walter Kerr of the Herald Tribune said: "Some of us have been campaigning lately for a return to the old-fashioned, slam-bang, gags-and-girls musical comedy. Some of us ought to be shot." A review in the New York Post was equally critical: "My impression of Ankles Aweigh is that it has neither the brightness and wit to be satisfying as satire or the charm to be winning as nostalgia. ... The libretto ... seems to be remembered by Guy Bolton and Eddie Davis rather than written. ... I assuredly didn't enjoy Ankles Aweigh, but I would be the last to claim it was trying to deceive anybody." A more mixed assessment from William Hawkins writing in the New York World–Telegram and Sun praised the costumes, saying "every girl in it had the choice of a lifetime dress to wear."

The Goodspeed revival was better received by audiences, but not by critics: "For all the inventiveness of its intentions," Alvin Klein wrote in The New York Times, the revival "clinches the show's status as a musical that one will go on forgetting to remember."

== Recordings ==
An original cast recording was released by Decca Records in 1955. The recording does not include the songs "Old Fashioned Mothers", "The Villain Always Gets It", and "The Code". In addition, the song "Nothing Can Replace a Man" appears after "Ready Cash", instead of after "Headin' for the Bottom". A CD re-issue was released in 2004.
