= Mick Hazen =

American actor (born 1993)

- Born: March 22, 1993 (age 32); New York City, New York
- Occupation: Actor

Mick Hazen (born March 22, 1993) is an American actor. He starred on the CBS soap opera As the World Turns as Parker Snyder, the son of the late Hal Munson and Carly Tenney (played by Benjamin Hendrickson and Maura West) and the adoptive son of Jack Snyder (played by Michael Park). He made his first appearance in November 2006, taking over the role from Giovani Cimmino. For his work on the show, Mick won a Young Artist Award in 2009, 2010 and 2011.

== Career ==
Hazen was discovered when a casting agent came to his school. His first acting gig was in an episode Chappelle's Show. Before As the World Turns, he also made appearances on Guiding Light and Third Watch. In 2004, Mick played Ike Guthrie in the television movie Plainsong alongside Aidan Quinn and Rachel Griffiths. For his performance as Ike, Mick received a Young Artist Award nomination for Best Supporting Young Actor in a TV Movie, Miniseries or Special. Mick also contributed voices to Disney's "Meet The Robinsons" and has done many voiceovers for television commercials. He would have appeared in Warner Brothers' Going the Distance as Zeff if his scene was not cut. The film was released in August 2010 and starred Drew Barrymore and Justin Long.

He has played tennis since he was three and has competed in many USTA junior events.

== Filmography ==
=== Film ===
| Year | Title | Role | Notes |
|---|---|---|---|
| 2006 | A Very Serious Person | Dave | |
| 2007 | Meet the Robinsons | Additional voices | |
| 2010 | Going the Distance | Zeff | |
| 2018 | Summer Days, Summer Nights | Bobby | |

=== Television ===
| Year | Title | Role | Notes |
|---|---|---|---|
| 2003 | Chappelle's Show | Jeffrey Jacobson | Episode: "O'Dweeds & Trading Spouses" |
| 2004 | Plainsong | Ike Guthrie | Television film |
| 2004 | Third Watch | Charlie Yokas | 2 episodes |
| 2006 | Guiding Light | Jason Frederick Marler | Episode #1.14890 |
| 2006–2010 | As the World Turns | Parker Snyder | 355 episodes |
| 2014 | Black Box | Miles | Episode: "Jerusalem" |
| 2014 | Forever | Devin | Episode: "The Frustrating Thing About Psychopaths" |
| 2015 | The Affair | Hot Counselor | Episode #2.4 |
| 2016 | Falling Water | Teen Woody | Episode: "The Swirl" |
