= The Tale of the Allergist's Wife =

Play written by Charles Busch

The Tale of the Allergist's Wife is a play by Charles Busch.

In his first play written for a mainstream audience, Busch explores the Upper West Side milieu of aspiring intellectual and middle-aged upper class matron Marjorie Taub, who lives comfortably with her doctor husband Ira in an expensively furnished condo near Zabar's and spends her days and evenings pursuing culture at various museums and the theatre. Her ongoing effort to improve her mind and soul has brought Marjorie to the conclusion she never will be more than mediocre, a feeling enhanced by her elderly mother's constant complaints about her shortcomings and her husband's altruistic dedication to serving the needs of the homeless. Following an emotional outburst in a Disney Store resulting in considerable breakage, Marjorie retires to the safety of her home to wallow in a mid-life crisis. Unexpectedly invading her depression is flamboyant childhood friend Lee who, much like The Man Who Came to Dinner, becomes entrenched in the Taub household as a seemingly permanent guest, not only drawing Marjorie out of her dark mood, but affecting her marriage as well.

The original Manhattan Theatre Club production opened on February 29, 2000 and ran for 56 performances. Excellent reviews prompted a move to Broadway. After 25 previews, it opened on November 2, 2000 at the Ethel Barrymore Theatre, where it ran for 777 performances. The original cast, directed by Lynne Meadow, included Linda Lavin as Marjorie, Tony Roberts as Ira, and Michele Lee as Lee. Later in the run, Lavin was replaced first by Valerie Harper and then by Rhea Perlman, while Richard Kind and Marilu Henner assumed the roles of Ira and Lee.

Ben Brantley of The New York Times observed, "Mr. Busch is best-known for his appealingly warped cinematic parodies in which he plays the nobly suffering or archly conniving leading lady . . . Here the female icon that Mr. Busch comes closest to impersonating is Wendy Wasserstein, the writer of such beloved epigram-slinging hits as The Heidi Chronicles and The Sisters Rosensweig. You may also find yourself thinking of Neil Simon's mid-career comedies, plays that present harried New Yorkers speaking naturally in competitive one-liners . . . Tale has moments cut from the synthetic cloth of television comedy, and it doesn't quite know how to resolve itself. But it earns its wall-to-wall laughs."

== Awards and nominations ==
- Outer Critics Circle Award for Outstanding Off-Broadway Play (nominee)
- Outer Critics Circle John Gassner Award for Outstanding Playwrighting (Charles Busch, winner)
- Tony Award for Best Play (nominee)
- Tony Award for Best Performance by a Leading Actress in a Play (Linda Lavin, nominee)
- Tony Award for Best Performance by a Featured Actress in a Play (Michele Lee, nominee)
- Drama Desk Award for Outstanding New Play (nominee)
- Drama Desk Award for Outstanding Actress in a Play (Lavin, nominee)
