= Trouble on the Corner =

1997 American crime drama film

- Directed by: Alan Madison
- Written by: Alan Madison
- Produced by: Alan Madison; Dan Stern; Diane Kolyer; Glenn Krevlin; Henry Eisenberg
- Starring: Tony Goldwyn; Edie Falco
- Cinematography: Phil Abraham
- Distributed by: Trouble On the Corner L.C.C.
- Release date: October 9, 1997
- Running time: 114 minutes
- Language: English

Trouble on the Corner is a 1997 American crime film written and directed by Alan Madison, and starring Tony Goldwyn.

== Plot ==
Jeff Steward is a psychologist living in the same apartment complex. After a piece of the ceiling collapses, he finds a woman taking a bath at the upper apartment. This causes total disorder of his normal life and he starts mixing the patients' psychoses up with his own.

== Cast ==
- Tony Goldwyn - Jeff Steward
- Edie Falco - Vivian Steward
- Debi Mazar - Ericca Ricce
- Joe Morton - Detective Bill
- Tammy Grimes - Mrs. K.
- Giancarlo Esposito - Daryl
- Roger Rees - McMurtry
- Bruce MacVittie - Sandy
- Mark Margolis - Mr. Borofsky
- Charles Busch - Ms. Ellen

== Reception ==
The reviewer for Variety felt that the picture started strongly but deteriorated after the first hour: "it’s as if Madison had a really cool idea to start with (and a great hand with just the right cast) but no carefully reasoned plan as to how to wind things down".
