= A Very Serious Person =

- Directed by: Charles Busch
- Written by: Charles Busch; Carl Andress
- Produced by: Daryl Roth; Richard Guay
- Starring: Polly Bergen; Charles Busch; Dana Ivey; Julie Halston; Carl Andress; P.J. Verhoest
- Cinematography: Joseph Parlagreco
- Edited by: Frank Reynolds
- Music by: Andrew Sherman
- Distributed by: Wolfe Video
- Release date: April 28, 2006
- Running time: 95 minutes
- Country: United States
- Language: English

A Very Serious Person is a 2006 drama film directed by Charles Busch and starring Polly Bergen, Charles Busch, Dana Ivey, Julie Halston, Carl Andress, and P.J. Verhoest.

== Plot ==
Jan (Charles Busch), an itinerant male nurse from Denmark, takes a new job with Mrs. A (Polly Bergen), a terminally ill Manhattan woman raising her parentless thirteen-year-old grandson, Gil (PJ Verhoest). Spending the summer by the shore, the emotionally reserved Jan finds himself oddly cast as a mentor to Gil in having to prepare the sensitive boy for life with his cousins in Florida after his grandmother's death. A deep friendship grows between these two solitary people. By the end of the summer, Gil has developed a new maturity and independence, while the enigmatic Jan has revealed his own vulnerability.

== Cast ==
Actor	Role
Polly Bergen	Mrs. A
Charles Busch	Jan
Dana Ivey	Betty
Julie Halston	Glenda
Carl Andress	Lee
P.J. Verhoest	Gil
J. Smith-Cameron	Carol
Mick Hazen	Dave
Eric Nelsen	Dan
Frank Senger	Handyman
Carmen Pelaez	Nurse Terry
Becky London	Mrs. Kupchunas
Marvin Einhorn	Mr. Horowitz
Jonathan Ospa	Travis
Ben Roberts	Waiter
Heather Schacht	Little Girl
Simon Fortin	Gilles
Judith Hawking	Maude
Alexa Eisenstein	Crystal
Kevin Scullin	Paramedic
John McNamara	Paramedic
Bunny Levine	Mrs. Nadel
Michael McCormick	Photo Vendor
Mark Richard Keith	Larry
Arnie Kolodner	Randy
William Charles Mitchell	Harvey
