= Die, Mommie, Die! =

- Theatrical release poster
- Directed by: Mark Rucker
- Screenplay by: Charles Busch
- Based on: Die! Mommie! Die! by Charles Busch
- Produced by: Dante Di Loreto; Anthony Edwards; Bill Kenwright
- Starring: Charles Busch; Jason Priestley; Frances Conroy; Philip Baker Hall; Stark Sands; Natasha Lyonne
- Cinematography: Kelly Evans
- Edited by: Philip Harrison
- Music by: Dennis McCarthy
- Production companies: Aviator Films; Bill Kenwright Films
- Distributed by: Sundance Film Series
- Release dates: January 20, 2003 (Sundance); October 31, 2003
- Running time: 94 minutes
- Country: United States
- Language: English
- Box office: $320,092

Die, Mommie, Die! is a 2003 American satirical black comedy film written by female impersonator Charles Busch, who also plays the lead role. Partly spoof and partly homage, it draws heavily on the tropes and themes of American "Psycho-biddy" films and plays from the 1950s and 1960s that featured strong, sometimes dominating female leads. It is adapted from a play of the same name by Busch, first performed in 1999.

== Plot ==
The film opens with Angela Arden kneeling in front of her twin sister Barbara's grave. Angela is a lounge singer who is attempting to resuscitate her floundering career, which became obsolete around the same time Barbara committed suicide. She is unhappily married to her film director husband Sol Sussman, with whom she has two children – Lance, who is gay and emotionally disturbed, and Edith, a "daddy's girl" who is openly contemptuous of her mother. Also living in the house is the snoopy maid Bootsie, who is infatuated with Sol. Bored and unhappy, Angela begins cheating on her husband with Tony Parker, a tennis-playing bisexual "lothario" and failed actor who is reputed to be well endowed.

Sol finds out after hiring a private detective to follow Angela around. He confronts her about it but he refuses to divorce her. Instead, he gives her "life in prison". Not only does he cancel all of Angela's credit cards, he forbids her from performing at an engagement in New York, destroying the contract before she has a chance to sign it. Feeling trapped and eager to get her hands on her husband's money, Angela poisons an ever-constipated Sol with an arsenic-laced suppository.

Despite the fact that Angela receives virtually nothing in Sol's will, her children, along with Bootsie, begin to suspect Angela's involvement. And the suspicious circumstances of Sol's death bring old questions about Angela's sister's death to light. Edith – and later Lance – hatch a plot to get her to confess. Meanwhile, Tony successfully seduces both the children, taking an unusual interest in the details surrounding Aunt Barbara's death. After Bootsie is found dead, the children eventually get Angela to confess her crimes by lacing her evening coffee with LSD.

During her bender, Angela not only reveals that she poisoned Sol, but that she is not Angela but really Barbara. In flashback, Barbara reveals how as Angela's career flourished, her own fell apart, culminating in her arrest for jewelry theft. After serving her sentence, Barbara arrived at Angela's mansion, greeted with scorn and ridicule from the immensely egotistical Angela. Watching the physical and emotional abuse Angela doled out to Sol and the children, Barbara devised a plan to poison her sister and take over her life, her family and, most importantly, her career. The children watch with confusion as Barbara announces she killed Angela.

As they turn the tape over to Tony, Edith and Lance fight over who will be the one to run away with him, while he respectfully refuses both of them. Meanwhile, a masked assailant pops up and tries to dispatch Barbara; in the scuffle, Barbara pulls off the assailant's mask, revealing Sol underneath. With all the primary players in the room, Sol reveals how he and Bootsie faked his death for him to escape outstanding mob debts he could not pay back and how he was forced to kill Bootsie to protect his secret. Tony then reveals he is really an FBI agent who has been heading a case investigating Angela's murder before arresting Sol. The children – finally understanding Barbara's motives and desperation – hug Barbara while Tony says he will destroy the evidence to protect her from an eventual prison stint and trip to the gas chamber. But Barbara tells them, as she walks to her waiting police escort outside, that by finally being herself, she will finally gain her freedom from living under her sister's shadow.

== Cast ==
- Charles Busch as Angela Arden / Barbara Arden
- Jason Priestley as Tony Parker
- Frances Conroy as Bootsie Carp
- Philip Baker Hall as Sol Sussman
- Stark Sands as Lance Sussman
- Natasha Lyonne as Edith Sussman
- Victor Raider-Wexler as Sam Fishbein
- Nora Dunn as Shatzi Van Allen
- Stanley DeSantis as Tuchman

== Production ==
Die, Mommie, Die! is based on a play of the same name by Busch, subtitled The Fall of the House of Sussman. It is a parody of 1960s gothic horror films like Hush...Hush, Sweet Charlotte, crossed with the Greek tragedy Electra by Sophocles. Busch originally planned to adapt Electra and play Clytemnestra, but finding the costumes "so drab, so Greek", he set the work in 1967 ("a truly groovy year in fashion") and added the horror element.

Michael Bottari and Ronald Case designed Busch's more than 50 costumes in the film.

== Release ==
The film debuted on January 20, 2003, at the 2003 Sundance Film Festival, with a wider release in October 2003. The region 1 DVD was released on June 29, 2004.

== Reception ==
Busch won the Special Jury Prize for Performance for the film at the 2003 Sundance Film Festival.

== Stage version ==
The original play—spelled and punctuated as Die! Mommy! Die!—was first produced in Los Angeles at the Coast Playhouse from July to September 1999. In addition to Busch as Angela and Barbara, the show starred Greg Mullavey as Sol, Dorie Barton as Edith, Wendy Worthington as Bootsie, Mark Capri as Tony and Carl Andress as Lance. Though initially scheduled to close in August 1999, the play's run was extended through September, with Playbill calling it a "smash hit". Writing for Variety, Robert Hofler called the play "Charles Busch's funniest, most accomplished and, without question, raunchiest work". Michael Phillips of the Los Angeles Times praised Busch as "peerless performer" who "is reason enough to see this show", but noted that "the satiric unevenness can't be disguised" and "the supporting cast disappoints". Michael Bottari and Ronald Case, longtime costume designers for Busch, created his wardrobe and, with designer Dione H. Lebhar, were nominated for an Ovation Award for the production. Barton was also nominated as Featured Actress in a Play.

Produced in New York for the first time in 2007, the show opened for previews on October 10 Off-Broadway at the New World Stages, officially opening on October 21, 2007. The cast included Busch recreating his original roles, Ashley Austin Morris as Edith, Kristine Nielsen as Bootsie, Van Hansis as Lance, Bob Ari as Sol and Chris Hoch as Tony. Directed by Andress, who played Lance in the 1999 production, the show closed on January 13, 2008. Mark Blankenship of Variety called Busch "radiant", praising his performance and writing, as well as the play's "ludicrous-yet-stylish tone". Busch's costumes by Bottari and Case won them a 2008 Lucille Lortel Award for Outstanding Costume Design alongside designer Jessica Jahn, and the three were also nominated for a Drama Desk Award, and an Outer Critics Circle Award.
