= Lawrence Kornfeld =

American theater director (born 1930)

- Born: May 21, 1930
- Died: August 14, 2023 (aged 93)
- Occupation(s): Director, teacher

Lawrence Kornfeld (May 21, 1930 – August 14, 2023) was an American theater director known for his off-off-Broadway and underground theater performances in New York City. He was an artistic director of The Living Theater in the late 1950s and a founder of the Judson Poets Theater. He taught at SUNY Purchase and the Yale School of Drama. His request for a composition from Al Carmines in 1962 launched the latter's compositional career in experimental theater.

== Personal life and death ==
Lawrence Kornfeld was married to the psychotherapist Margaret Kornfeld (1936–2023), with whom he had a daughter. He died on August 14, 2023, at the age of 93.
