= Vampire Lesbians of Sodom =

Play written by Charles Busch

- Original language: English
- Written by: Charles Busch
- Characters: The Succubus; Madelaine Astarte
- Genre: Satire

Premiere
- Date: 1984
- Place: Limbo Lounge; New York City

Vampire Lesbians of Sodom is a satirical play written by Charles Busch. It features a series of vignettes that deal with the lives of two eponymous immortal vampire lesbians, a creature known as The Succubus who is also known as La Condessa or Magda Legerdemaine, and the virgin-turned-vampire who becomes known as Madelaine Astarte and Madelaine Andrews. The two are locked in eternal, if comic, antagonism after surviving the downfall of the Biblical city in question. Particular conflict occurs when both women arrive in 1920s/1930s Broadway and Hollywood and masquerade as silent film stars. A final scene in Las Vegas in the 1980s sees them finally reach a truce.

Described by The New York Times as having "costumes flashier than pinball machines, outrageous lines, awful puns, sinister innocence, harmless depravity", it was first performed at the Limbo Lounge in Manhattan's East Village in 1984 and moved Off-Broadway in June 1985 to the Provincetown Playhouse, where it ran for five years.

== International productions ==
From November 2013 through August 2014, a musical-like adaptation of Vampire Lesbians of Sodom was staged in Brazil, and performing at the Teatro Municipal Café Pequeno in Rio de Janeiro, including additional performances at the Teatro Popular Oscar Niemeyer in Niterói, the Teatro Dulcina in Rio de Janeiro, and at the Festival Internacional de Teatro in São José do Rio Preto. There were a little over 30 performances in total. Considered one of the best plays in town in 2014 by critics, and three-time winner of the Cenym Award for best supporting actor (Thiago Chagas), best cast, and best sound design and execution.

It was translated, and adapted into a musical by Jonas Klabin, who also directed and produced this version. Artistic supervision of Cesar Augusto, musical director by Davi Guilhermme, choreography by Alan Rezende. Starring Marya Bravo, Thiago Chagas, André Vieira, Davi Guilhermme, Thadeu Matos, and Thuany Parente. The songs were chosen from 1920s and 1930s Weimar Republic cabaret music, translated and adapted to the days.
