= Provincetown Playhouse =

Theater in Manhattan, New York

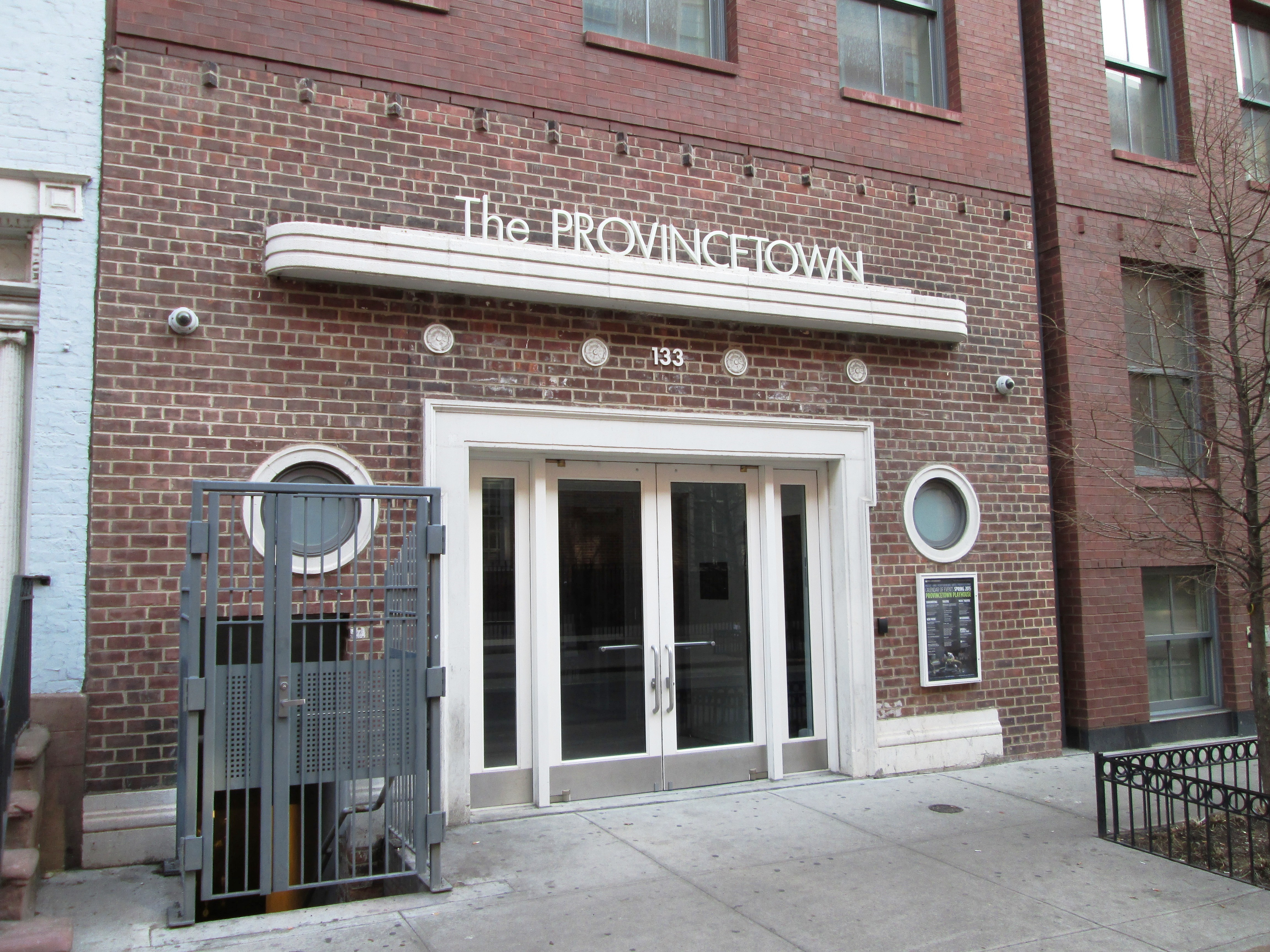
- The entrance to the Provincetown Playhouse in April 2015
- Interactive map of Provincetown Playhouse
- Address: 133 MacDougal Street, New York City, U.S.
- Location: Greenwich Village New York City, U.S.
- Coordinates: 40.7307°N 74.0000°W
- Owner: Steinhardt School of Culture, Education, and Human Development, New York University
- Type: Theatre
- Event: Theatre
- Public transit: New York City Subway: West Fourth Street–Washington Square, Eighth Street–New York University

Construction
- Built: 19th Century
- Opened: 1918
- Renovated: 1940, 1992–1998, 2008–2010

Website
- steinhardt.nyu.edu/departments/music-and-performing-arts-professions/facilities

The Provincetown Playhouse is a historic theatre at 133 MacDougal Street between West 3rd and 4th streets in the Greenwich Village neighborhood of Manhattan in New York City. It is named for the Provincetown Players, who converted the former stable and wine-bottling plant into a theater in 1918.

The original Provincetown Players included George Cram Cook, Susan Glaspell, Eugene O'Neill, John Reed, Louise Bryant, Floyd Dell, Ida Rauh, Edna St. Vincent Millay, and Djuna Barnes. Paul Robeson performed at the theatre, and E. E. Cummings had his play "Him" performed in the building. Ann Harding, Bette Davis, and Claudette Colbert made their New York stage debuts in the facility.

== History ==
The Provincetown Playhouse was originally located at 139 Macdougal when it opened in 1916; it moved to its current space, 133 Macdougal, in 1918. The building was a former stable and wine-bottling plant built in the 19th century. The building was extensively renovated in 1940. There has been controversy over whether the site deserves to have landmark status. The New York City Landmarks Preservation Commission on April 29, 2008 said that the site did not have the "historical and architectural integrity required for individual New York City landmark designation", but the New York State Office of Parks, Recreation and Historic Preservation found the building eligible for listing on the State and National Registers of Historic Places, in response to a request from the Greenwich Village Society for Historic Preservation (GVSHP).

That same year, New York University proposed to demolish the entire building and rebuild a facility for its law school, as well as a new theater. In the face of community opposition, NYU agreed to preserve just six percent of the old building: the walls containing the small theater in the southern corner of the building. However, during construction, NYU tore down parts of the walls they had promised to preserve, a fact revealed by GVSHP.

== Chronology ==
- 1915–1916 – The Provincetown Players are formed in Provincetown, MA.
- 1916 – The Provincetown Players turn the parlor of 139 Macdougal Street into their first theatre.
- 1918 – The Provincetown Players move into 133 Macdougal Street.
- 1918–1922 – The Provincetown Players grow in popularity, garnering 1600 subscribers in the 1920–21 season.
- 1923–1926 – The Experimental Theatre, Inc. begins their work in the Playhouse, helmed by Kenneth Macgowan, Robert Edmund Jones, and Eugene O'Neill, with Mary Eleanor Fitzgerald as business manager, and a few members of the former Provincetown Players involved.
- 1924 – Paul Robeson's kiss on the hand of white actress Mary Blair in Eugene O'Neill's All God's Chillun Got Wings is reported on the front page of many national newspapers, leading to protests outside the theatre.
- 1926 – The Experimental Theatre, Inc. disbands and Fitzgerald along with original Player director James Light reform the Provincetown Players doing occasional productions, including the premiere of Paul Green's Pulitzer Prize-winning play In Abraham's Bosom.
- 1928 – E. E. Cummings' play Him premiered at the Playhouse on April 18. The play attracted large crowds and wide critical denouncement for its 27 performance run, but ultimately, because of the scale of the production, made no money for the Players.
- 1929 – The Earth Between, features a young unknown actress named Bette Davis. The last play produced by this third iteration of the Players was Winter Bound by Thomas H. Dickinson, and after unsuccessfully attempting to raise funds in light of the Stock Market crash of 1929, the group folded in December 1929.
- 1931 – Don Mullally and H. A. Archibald's play Coastwise is staged starring the actresses Shirley Booth and Lucia Moore.
- 1936–1939 – The Federal Theatre Project utilized the Provincetown as a training institute for designers and teachers.
- 1940 – The Playhouse's upper stories were demolished and reorganized. The theatre itself remained unaltered, but the building was refaced and the façade was demolished and completely redesigned.
- 1941–1942 – The Provincetown Playhouse building was merged with three neighboring buildings (133–139 Macdougal) to become one apartment building.
- 1945–1950 – The Light Opera Theatre Company produced short runs of Gilbert and Sullivan operettas for returning GIs, youth, and adult audiences.
- 1950 – The American Young People's Theatre hosted a series of original productions for young audiences through the fall and holiday season.
- 1954–1955 – The Opera Players and Opera '55 produced two seasons of new works by up-and-coming composers.
- 1959 – A festival of George Bernard Shaw plays is produced, featuring the American professional premiere of Buoyant Billions.
- 1960–1961 – The double-bill (and American premieres) of Edward Albee's The Zoo Story and Samuel Beckett's Krapp's Last Tape are a success, running for 582 performances.
- 1964 – Al Carmines' Home Movies and Softly Consider the Nearness are transferred to the Provincetown for a modest run after a successful run at the Judson Poets' Theatre.
- 1968 – John Guare's Muzeeka and Sam Shepard's Red Cross have successful runs featuring an unknown Sam Waterston.
- 1979 – Pat Carroll appeared for eighteen months in the award-winning one-woman show Gertrude Stein Gertrude Stein Gertrude Stein.
- 1982 – La MaMa ETC's 20th Anniversary production of Sam Shepard's The Unseen Hand was paired with Killer's Head at the Provincetown and played over 100 performances.
- 1982–1983 – David Mamet's Edmond had its New York premiere at the Provincetown, featuring Patti LuPone as a replacement.
- 1984 – NYU was sold 133 Macdougal by a group of real estate lawyers and former NYU law students for $1.
- 1985–1990 – Charles Busch's successful Vampire Lesbians of Sodom played more than 2,000 performances, making it one of the longest running plays in Off-Broadway history.
- 1991–1992 – The final professional season at the Provincetown featured performances by Tatum O'Neal, (A Terrible Beauty), Cynthia Nixon, and Lisa Gay Hamilton, and direction by Terry Kinney, co-founder of the Steppenwolf Theatre Company (Servy-n-Bernice 4ever).
- 1992–1998 – No performances at the Playhouse; the theatre remained dark because its restrooms were downstairs without elevator access, and so it was shut down by the city building commission.
- 1997–1998 – NYU majorly renovated the Playhouse. The renovations cost the university $900,000.
- 1998–2008 – NYU Steinhardt's Programs in Educational Theatre and Vocal Performance hosted a variety of programming for NYU students and the wider community including theatrical, musical, and opera productions, concerts, storytelling, Looking for Shakespeare, and the award-winning New Plays for Young Audiences summer reading series, which continues today.
- 2008–2010 – NYU spent 4.5 million dollars renovating 133 Macdougal. Members of the Historic Districts Council and other preservationists complained that the building is so different from the original that it should no longer be called The Provincetown Playhouse.
- 2010–Present – NYU re-opens the Playhouse; it is subsequently used by its theatre program.
