= Charles Busch =

American dramatist

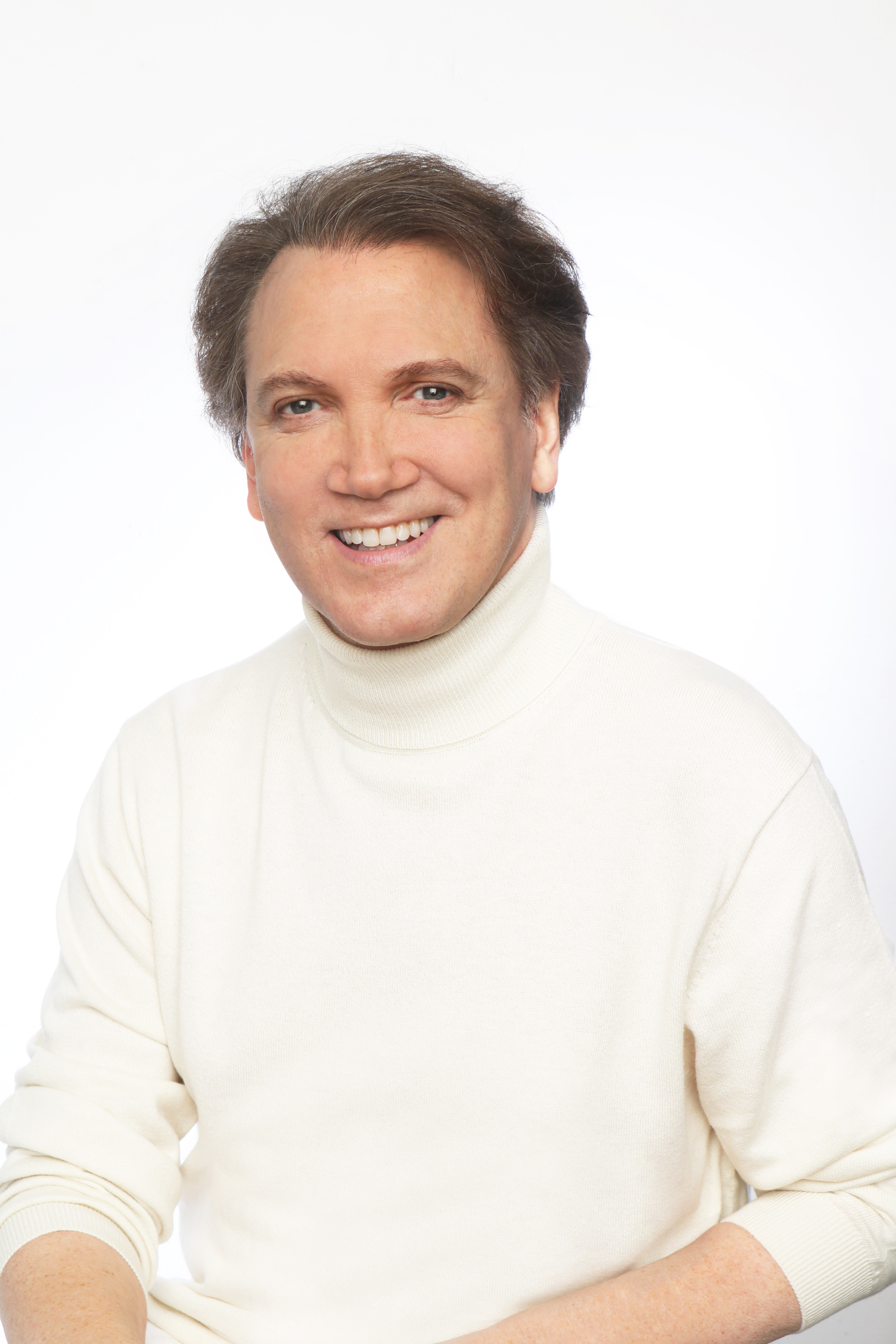
- Busch in 2015
- Born: Charles Louis Busch; August 23, 1954 (age 72); New York City, U.S.
- Education: Northwestern University (BA)
- Occupations: Actor; playwright; screenwriter; author; director
- Years active: 1978–present
- Website: charlesbusch.com

Charles Louis Busch (born August 23, 1954) is an American actor, screenwriter, playwright and drag queen, known for his appearances on stage in his own camp style plays and in film and television. He wrote and starred in his early plays off-off-Broadway beginning in 1978, generally in drag roles, and also acted in the works of other playwrights. He also wrote for television and began to act in films and on television in the late 1990s. His best known play is The Tale of the Allergist's Wife (2000), which was a success on Broadway.

== Biography ==
=== Early life ===
Busch was born in 1954 and grew up in Hartsdale, New York. He is the Jewish son of Gertrude (née Young) and Benjamin Busch. His father, who wanted to be an opera singer, owned a record store. His mother died when Busch was seven. He has two older sisters: Meg Busch, who used to be a producer of promotional spots for Showtime, and Betsy Busch, a textile designer. Busch's aunt, Lillian Blum, his mother's oldest sister and a former teacher, brought him to live in Manhattan after the death of his mother. Busch was intensely interested in films as a young child, especially those with female leads from the 1930s and 1940s.

Busch attended The High School of Music and Art in Manhattan. He majored in drama at Northwestern University in Evanston, Illinois and received his B.A. in 1976. While at the university, Busch had difficulty being cast in plays and began to write his own material, which succeeded in drawing interest on campus.

=== Early theatre years ===
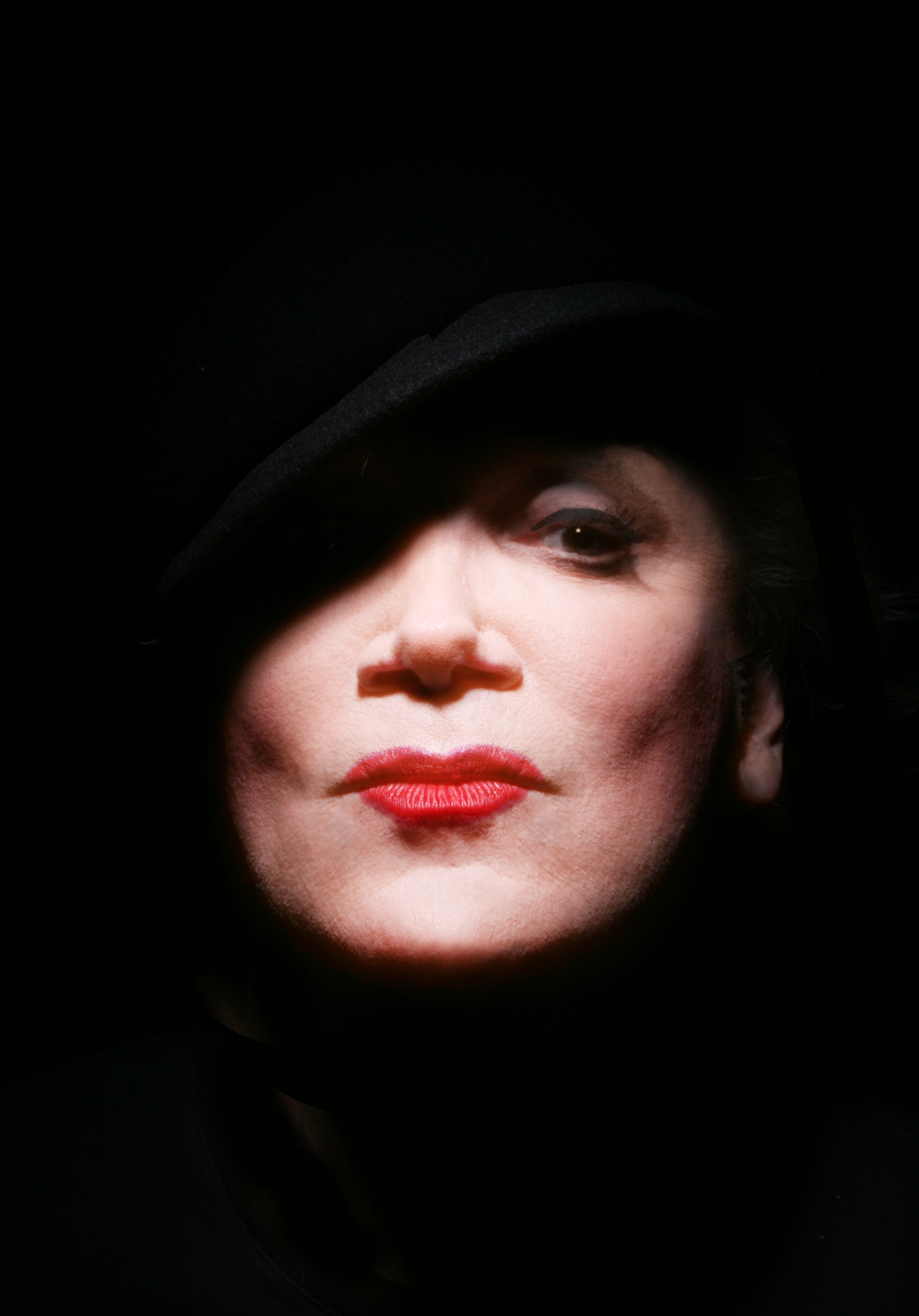
Busch in drag

In his plays, Busch usually played the leading lady in drag. He has said, "Drag is being more, more than you can be. When I first started drag I wasn't this shy young man but a powerful woman. It liberated within me a whole vocabulary of expression. It was less a political statement than an aesthetic one." His camp style shows simultaneously send up and celebrate classic film genres.

Busch has said, however, "I'm not sure what [campy] means, but I guess if my plays have elements of old movies and old fashioned plays, and I'm this bigger-than-life star lady, that's certainly campy. I guess what I rebelled against was the notion that campy means something is so tacky or bad that it's good, and that I just didn't relate to." Busch toured the country in a non-drag one-man show he wrote called Alone With a Cast of Thousands from 1978 to 1984.

By 1984, Busch's performance bookings grew slim. He held various odd jobs, such as temporary office assistant, apartment cleaner, portrait artist "at bar mitzvahs", phone salesperson, shop manager, ice cream server, sports handicapper and artists' model.

He thought perhaps that this last piece would be a skit put on in the Limbo Lounge, a performance space and gallery in the East Village in Manhattan. The skit was a hit and became Vampire Lesbians of Sodom (1984).

Busch and his collaborators soon created a series of shows, mostly at the Limbo Lounge, such as Theodora, She-Bitch of Byzantium (1984) and Times Square Angel (1985, Provincetown Playhouse). The company called itself "Theatre in Limbo" and attracted a loyal gay following. Other early plays include Pardon My Inquisition, or Kiss the Blood Off My Castanets (1986), in which Busch played both Maria Garbanza, a prostitute, and her look-alike, the elegant Marquesa del Drago; Psycho Beach Party, which ran from July 1987 to May 1988; The Lady in Question, which ran from July to December 1989 at the Orpheum Theatre; and Red Scare on Sunset, which ran from June to September 1991 at the Lortel Theatre.

Busch rewrote the book for the musical Ankles Aweigh for a 1988 production staged by the Goodspeed Opera House in East Haddam, Connecticut.

His Charles Busch Revue was produced at the Ballroom Theatre in May 1993 in New York. Also in 1993, he performed in a revival of Jean Genet's The Maids at the Off-Broadway Classic Stage Company in the role of Solange.

In 1993, he wrote a novel, Whores of Lost Atlantis, a fictionalized re-telling of the creation of Vampire Lesbians of Sodom. The Green Heart was adapted by Busch from a short story by Jack Ritchie into a musical which was produced by the Manhattan Theater Club at the Variety Arts Theatre in New York City, opening in April 1997.

He took the male lead in his comedy, You Should Be So Lucky which opened at Primary Stages Company, New York City, in November 1994.

Other works of the 1990s include Swingtime Canteen, produced at the Blue Angel, New York City, in August 1995. His one-man show, Flipping My Wig ran at the WPA Theater, New York City, starting in December 1996.

He wrote Queen Amarantha, which played at the WPA Theatre, starting in October 1997. His play Die, Mommie, Die! was first performed in Los Angeles, opening in July 1999 at the Coast Playhouse.

=== Film and television ===
Busch's early film appearances include Ms. Ellen, a fortune teller in drag in Trouble on the Corner (1997). Busch has twice appeared in film versions of his own plays: Die, Mommie, Die! (1999) and the comedy horror Psycho Beach Party (2000). He co-wrote, starred in and directed the film A Very Serious Person (2006), which starred Polly Bergen and received an honorable mention at the Tribeca Film Festival. In 2020, Busch co-wrote, co-directed, and starred in the film, The Sixth Reel (2021).

Busch had a recurring role in the HBO series Oz from 1999 to 2000 (the third and fourth seasons) as Nat Ginzburg, an "effeminate but makeup-free inmate on death row, certainly a departure from his usual glamour girl roles." He wrote television sitcom pilots and movie treatments as a source of extra income while he was a cult performer. He sold three pilots to CBS that were not produced. In 2001, he guest starred on the American soap opera, One Life to Live, playing Peg Barlow, a woman who owns a modeling agency. Nowhere in the show was it referenced that a male actor was portraying a woman.

=== Stage work, 2000–present ===
Busch's work debuted on Broadway in October 2000, when The Tale of the Allergist's Wife opened, following an Off-Broadway run in February through April 2000. The play, his first in which he did not star, and the first created for a mainstream audience, was written for actress Linda Lavin, who played opposite Michele Lee and Tony Roberts. Allergist's Wife received a 2001 nomination for Tony Award for Best Play and ran for 777 performances. His other Broadway work was rewriting the book for Boy George's short-lived autobiographical musical Taboo. Since 2000, Busch has performed an annual one-night staged reading of his 1984 Christmas play Times Square Angel. In January 2003, he headlined a revival of his 1999 play Shanghai Moon, costarring BD Wong, at the Drama Dept, Greenwich House Theatre, New York City.

He has taken the eponymous lead in three productions of Auntie Mame: a staged reading in 1998; a benefit for Broadway Cares/Equity Fights AIDS in 2003; and a small-scale summer touring production in 2004.

Our Leading Lady, Busch's play about Laura Keene, was produced by the Manhattan Theater Club at the City Center Stage II Theatre, in 2007, and starred Kate Mulgrew. His play, The Third Story, premiered at the La Jolla Playhouse in September 2008 with Mary Beth Peil as Peg, and was then produced in New York by MCC Theater at the Lucille Lortel Theatre, starring Busch and Kathleen Turner (Peg), opening in February 2009. Busch wrote and starred in a play, The Divine Sister, a satirical take on Hollywood films about religion, including Doubt and the Sound of Music. It ran at the SoHo Playhouse in New York City, opening in September 2010. In 2013, Busch wrote and starred as Jimmy in the Primary Stages production of The Tribute Artist. In 2017, Busch and his former Auntie Mame co-star Penny Fuller both appeared in voiceover roles in the world premiere production of DIVA: Live From Hell. In March 2019, Busch starred as Lucille Ball in I Loved Lucy by playwright Lee Tannen at the Bridge Street Theatre in Catskill, New York.

In 2020, Primary Stages mounted another Busch play, The Confession of Lily Dare, which opened at Cherry Lane Theatre. For this production, Busch received Lucille Lortel and Drama Desk Award nominations for Outstanding Lead Actor in a Play and an Off Broadway Alliance Award nomination for Best Play. Primary Stages later selected Busch and his frequent collaborator Carl Andress to be the honorees at their annual gala and the joint recipients of the 2022 Einhorn Mentorship Award. In 2024, Busch's play Ibsen's Ghost was co-produced by Primary Stages and the George Street Playhouse.

== Performance style and influences ==
Busch's style is based on movie star acting rather than naturalistic femininity. Busch later said that he was described as "too thin, too light, which is the euphemism for gay. I was never cast at Northwestern for basically these reasons, and finally, I thought maybe what's most disturbing about me is what is most unique: my theatrical sense, my androgyny, even identifying with old movie actresses". He specializes in femmes fatales. "I'm an actor playing a role, but it's drag. A lot of drag can be very offensive, but I like to think that in some crazy way the women I play are feminist heroines."

Busch said, "I've always played a duality. I guess I've always felt a duality in myself: elegance and vulgarity. There's humor in that. I've always found that fun on stage, as well. It's not enough for me to be the whore. I have to be the whore with pretensions or the great lady with a vulgar streak. It's the duality that I find interesting." Busch generally writes without a political agenda, and he predominantly portrays characters who are white, middle class, gay, and between 20 and 40 years old. Even though Busch worked in a time when gay individuals were viewed and treated differently than straight individuals, straight audiences still enjoyed his work because of his "ability to entertain without creating a members-only atmosphere" (42).

Busch was inspired by Charles Ludlam, an avant-garde performer and playwright who founded The Ridiculous Theatrical Company in 1967 and wrote, directed, and acted in the company's exaggerated, absurdist camp productions. Busch presented his one-man show Hollywood Confidential in a theater owned by The Ridiculous Theatrical Company in July 1978 at One Sheridan Square, New York. He also appeared for several performances in the company's production of Bluebeard as Hecate, also in July 1978. Busch said of this experience: "If I had ever entertained a fantasy of working with the Ridiculous Theatrical Company, doing Hecate got it out of my system." Busch has said that he was also inspired by seeing Joan Sutherland and Zoe Caldwell perform when he was a child. Busch recalled: "When I was about 13 years old, around 1968 or '69, I went to see Zoe Caldwell in The Prime of Miss Jean Brodie. I was so dazzled that I don't think I've ever recovered." In 1991, Busch was performing in his play Red Scare on Sunset. He said that he had difficulty connecting with the audience at one of the performances. Caldwell went backstage after the performance to give him some advice: "'You are so beautiful. But you were pushing too hard. You're much better than that.' ...It's the best lesson I've learned from a famous person." During his run in The Tribute Artist, Busch revealed that he also found inspiration in drag performers Charles Pierce and Lynne Carter.

== Memoir ==
Busch released his memoir, Leading Lady: A Memoir of a Most Unusual Boy, in September 2023. In March 2024 it was shortlisted for the 2024 Lambda Literary Award for Gay Memoir or Biography.

== Work ==
=== Theater ===
Year	Title	Role	Details	Notes
1976	Sister Act	Esther		
1976	Old Coozies	Kit	La Mere Vipere	
1977	Myrtle Pope, the Story of a Woman Possessed	Myrtle Pope	Chicago, Illinois	
1978	Hollywood Confidential	One-man show	Scene One, New York	Playwright
1978	Hollywood Confidential	One-man show	The Ridiculous Theatrical Company, One Sheridan Square, NYC	Playwright
1978	Hollywood Confidential	One-man show	Hollywood Confidential, Victory Gardens Theatre, Chicago	Playwright
1979	Elephant Woman	—N/a	One Sheridan Square, June 1, 1979	Replacement
1979	Vagabond Vignettes		The Duplex, New York	"That's Show Biz" / "People on a New York Bus" / "La Marquesa"
1980	A Theatrical Party		Performing Garage, New York	
1980	Charles Busch Alone with a Cast of Thousands		Source Theatre, Washington, DC	Playwright
1981	Charles Busch Alone with a Cast of Thousands		Valencia Rose, San Francisco	Playwright
1982	Charles Busch Alone with a Cast of Thousands		Chicago Gay Arts Festival, Chicago	Playwright
1984	Charles Busch Alone with a Cast of Thousands		Indiana Rep, Indianapolis	Playwright
1981	Welcome to Corona			
1982	Before Our Mother's Eyes	David / Andreas	Theatre for the New City, New York City	
1982	Charles Busch Works Alone Tonight		Source Theatre, Washington, DC	Playwright
1984	Theodora, She-Bitch of Byzantium	Theatre-In-Limbo, Limbo Lounge, New York, NY, June 8, 1984		Playwright
1984	Sleeping Beauty or Coma	Fauna Alexander	Theatre-In-Limbo, Limbo Lounge, New York, NY, October 1984	Playwright
1985	Sleeping Beauty or Coma	Fauna Alexander	Provincetown Playhouse, June 19, 1985	Playwright
1985	Vampire Lesbians of Sodom	Virgin Sacrifice/Madeleine Asarte	Provincetown Playhouse, June 19, 1985	Playwright
1985	Times Square Angel	Irish O'Flanagan	Provincetown Playhouse, December 11, 1985	Playwright
1986	Pardon My Inquisition, or, Kiss the Blood off My Castanets	Marquesa del Drago / Maria Garbanza	Theatre-In-Limbo Limbo Lounge, New York, NY, May 16 – June 1, 1986	Playwright
1986	Gidget Goes Psychotic	Chicklet	Limbo Lounge, October 10–26, 1986	Playwright
1987	Psycho Beach Party (a.k.a. Gidget Goes Psychotic)	Chicklet	Players Theatre, July 20, 1987	Playwright
1988	Ankles Aweigh	—N/a	Goodspeed Opera House, July–September 1998	Book
1988	The Lady in Question	Gertrude Garnet	WPA Theatre, November 18, 1988	Playwright
1991	House of Flowers	—N/a	February 1991	Book
1991	Red Scare on Sunset	Mary Dale	WPA Theatre, March 19, 1991	Playwright
1991	Red Scare on Sunset	Mary Dale	Lucille Lortel Theatre, June 21, 1991	Playwright
1993	The Maids	Solange	East 13th Street/CSC Theatre, September 21, 1993	
1993	The Charles Busch Review	—N/a	The Ballroom, February–May 1993, July 13–August 1993	Written by
1994	You Should Be So Lucky	Christopher	Primary Stages, November 2, 1994	Playwright
1995	Swingtime Canteen	—N/a	Blue Angel, February 24, 1995	Playwright
1996	Flipping My Wig	—N/a	WPA Theatre, December 19, 1996	Playwright
1997	The Green Heart	—N/a	Variety Arts Theatre, April 10, 1997	Book
1997	Queen Amarantha	—N/a	WPA Theatre, October 23, 1997	Playwright; director
1999	Die Mommie Die!	Angela Arden	Coast Playhouse, July 1999	Playwright
2007	Die Mommie Die!	Angela Arden	New World Stages/Stage I, October 21, 2007	Playwright
2000	The Tale of the Allergist's Wife	—N/a	New York City Center/Stage II, February 29, 2000	Playwright
2024	The Tale of the Allergist's Wife	Marjorie Taub	Sharon Playhouse, September 13, 2024	Playwright
2003	Shanghai Moon	Lady Sylvia Allington	Greenwich House, January 15, 2003	
2003	Taboo	—N/a	The Plymouth Theatre, October 28, 2003	Book
2006	An Oak Tree	Father	Barrow Street Theatre, November 4, 2006	Replacement
2007	Spalding Gray: Stories Left to Tell	—N/a	Minetta Lane Theatre, March 6, 2007	Replacement
2007	Our Leading Lady	—N/a	New York City Center/Stage II, March 15, 2007	Playwright
2009	The Third Story	Queenie Bartlett/Baba Yaga	Lucille Lortel Theatre, February 2, 2009	Playwright
2010	The Divine Sister	Mother Superior	SoHo Playhouse, September 22, 2010	Playwright
2011	Olive and the Bitter Herbs	—N/a	59E59 Theaters/Theater A, August 16, 2011	Playwright
2013	Bunnicula: A Rabbit Tale of Musical Mystery	—N/a	DR2 Kids Theatre, February 10 – April 14, 2013	Written by
2014	The Tribute Artist	Jimmy	59E59 Theaters/Theater A, February 9, 2014	Playwright
2018	The Confession of Lily Dare	Lily Dare	Theater for the New City, April 4, 2018	Playwright
2020	The Confession of Lily Dare	Lily Dare	Cherry Lane Theatre, January 29, 2020	Playwright
2019	I Love Lucy	Lucille Ball	Bridge Street Theatre, March 22–23, 2019	
2024	Ibsen's Ghost: An Irresponsible Biographical Fantasy	Suzannah Thoresen Ibsen	59E59 Theaters, March 2 – April 14, 2024	Playwright

=== Filmography ===
Year	Title	Role	Notes
1987	Gandahar	Gemnen	Voice; English-version
1992	Addams Family Values	Countess Cousin Aphasia du Berry	
1994	It Could Happen to You	Timothy	
1997	Trouble on the Corner	Ms. Ellen	
1999–2000	Oz	Nat Ginzburg	8 episodes
2000	Psycho Beach Party	Captain Monica Stark	Screenplay credit
2001	One Life to Live	Peg Barlow	Guest role
2002	Frasier	Mark (voice)	Episode: "Enemy at the Gate"
2003	Die, Mommie, Die!	Angela Arden / Barbara Arden	Screenplay credit
2006	A Very Serious Person	Jan	Screenplay and director credit
2008	Lipstick Jungle	Ricardo Bragini	Episode: "Dressed to Kill"
2017	Say What!: A Geriatric Proposal	Hayes / Cynthia / Mrs. Weinstein	Short
2021	The Sixth Reel	Jimmy	Screenplay and director credit
2021	The House Arrest Rooneys	Margaret Rooney	Episode: "Proof of Concept Pilot"
2025	Adam and Steve Escape from Maga	Self	

== Awards and nominations ==
Year	Award	Category	Work	Result
2000	Drama Desk Award	Outstanding New Play	The Tale of the Allergist's Wife	Nominated
2000	Outer Critics Circle Award	John Gassner Award	The Tale of the Allergist's Wife	Won
2001	Tony Award	Best Play	The Tale of the Allergist's Wife	Nominated
2003	Drama Desk Award	Career Achievement Award		Honored
2003	Lucille Lortel Award	Outstanding Lead Actor	Shanghai Moon	Nominated
2008	Drama League Award	Distinguished Performance	Die, Mommie, Die!	Nominated
2011	Drama Desk Award	Outstanding Actor in a Play	The Divine Sister	Nominated
2011	Drama League Award	Distinguished Performance	The Divine Sister	Nominated
2020	Drama Desk Award	Outstanding Actor in a Play	The Confession of Lily Dare	Nominated
2020	Lucille Lortel Award	Outstanding Lead Actor in a Play	The Confession of Lily Dare	Nominated
2024	Lambda Literary Award	Gay Memoir or Biography	Leading Lady: A Memoir of a Most Unusual Boy	Nominated
2025	Obie Award	Lifetime Achievement Award		Honored

Busch received the Charlie Local and National Comedy Award from the Association of Comedy Artists in 1985 for "special contributions to the art of comedy." He also received the Manhattan Academy of Cabaret Award in 1985 and 1993.

In 2003, he won the Best Performance Award at the Sundance Film Festival for his performance in the film Die Mommie Die!

He has been honored with a star on the Playwright's Walk of Fame outside the Lucille Lortel Theatre in New York City and the Legend Award by the Off-Broadway League of Theatres. He was awarded the Gingold Theatrical Group Golden Shamrock award in 2014.

Busch is included in the book 50 Key Figures in Queer US Theatre (2022), with a chapter written by theatre scholar Sean F. Edgecomb. Busch was inducted into the Theater Hall of Fame in 2024.

== Bibliography ==
- Busch, Charles (1988). Four Plays. Fireside Theatre.
- Busch, Charles (1992). Three Plays. Fireside Theatre.
- Busch, Charles (1993). Whores of Lost Atlantis. Hyperion. ISBN 9781562827809.
- Busch, Charles (2001). The Tale of the Allergist's Wife and Other Plays: Vampire Lesbians of Sodom, Psycho Beach Party, The Lady in Question, Red Scare on Sunset. Grove Press. ISBN 9780802137852.
- Busch, Charles (2015). Outrageous! Monologues and the Odd Scene. Dramatic Publishing. ISBN 9781619590250.
- Busch, Charles (2023). Leading Lady: A Memoir of a Most Unusual Boy. Smart Pop. ISBN 9781637744147.

== Discography ==
- Charles Busch Live at Feinstein's/54 Below (2016)
