= Paul Holdengräber =

American interviewer, curator and writer (born 1960)

- Born: Houston, Texas, U.S.
- Education: Université catholique de Louvain; Princeton University (PhD)
- Occupations: Interviewer; Curator; Writer
- Spouse: Barbara Holdengräber
- Children: 2

Paul Holdengräber is an American interviewer, curator, and writer. He was director of the New York Public Library's public programming and organized literary conversations for the NYPL's public program series, LIVE from the NYPL, which he founded.

From February 2012 to July 2013, he hosted The Paul Holdengräber Show on YouTube's “Intelligent Channel”. In 2019, he was the founding executive director of The Onassis Foundation, a center of dialogue in Los Angeles.

== Early life ==
Holdengräber was born in Houston, Texas. His parents were Austrian Jews with roots in Romania and Poland, who fled Austria to Haiti during World War II. His father, Kurt, had been expelled during his second year of medical school, due to being Jewish. In Haiti, amid a Jewish community of 107 families, Kurt grew vegetables and worked as a farmer; it was in that country that he met and married Holdengräber's mother. The family moved from Haiti to Mexico City, where Paul's older sister was born. The family then moved from Mexico to Houston, and eventually settled in Brussels, Belgium. Holdengräber spent much of his youth hitchhiking around Europe.

Holdengräber studied philosophy at the Sorbonne. He received a bachelor's degree from the Université Catholique de Louvain, in Belgium. In 1995, Holdengräber received a Ph.D. in comparative literature from Princeton University. From 1995 to 1996, he did a post-doctoral fellowship at the Getty Research Institute.

== Career ==
=== Los Angeles County Museum of Art ===
Holdengräber is the founder and director of the Institute for Arts and Culture at the Los Angeles County Museum of Art, with the idea "to challenge the perception that museums are nothing more than mausoleums for Old Masters". Under Holdengräber's direction, the Institute hosted debates with painters, poets, performers, writers, and thinkers addressing critical cultural issues through talks, discussions, and performances.

=== New York Public Library ===
In 2004, the then NYPL President Paul LeClerc hired Holdengräber to create a public program at the New York Public Library. Holdengräber founded LIVE from the NYPL, a conversation series with writers, musicians, filmmakers and artists. As the director of LIVE from the NYPL, Holdengräber interviewed hundreds of public personalities, including Patti Smith, Zadie Smith, Anish Kapoor, and Jay Z.

He sees the New York Public Library as a storehouse of knowledge. One of his most memorable conversations was with the German filmmaker, Werner Herzog.

He has worked in partnership with organizations such as Rolex, The Moth, and PEN World Voices.

=== The Paul Holdengräber Show ===
On February 3, 2012, Holdengräber premiered an internet-television talk show called The Paul Holdengräber Show on YouTube's “Intelligent Channel”. The show featured interviews with Colum McCann, Elizabeth Gilbert and David Chang.

=== Teaching ===
He taught at Princeton University, Williams College, the University of Miami, and Claremont Graduate University.

== Personal life ==
Holdengräber lives in Glendale, California, a suburb of Los Angeles, with his wife, Barbara Wansbrough, and their two sons. Paul speaks English, French, German, Dutch, and Spanish. In Brussels, he spoke French and Flemish. Flemish is a low Franconian dialect cluster of the Dutch language. It is sometimes referred to Flemish Dutch, Belgian Dutch, or Southern Dutch. Flemish is native to the region known as Flanders in northern Belgium.

== Honors ==
- 2003: French Government, Chevalier des Arts et des Lettres
- Los Angeles Institute for the Humanities at University of Southern California, Fellow
- 1995–1996: Getty Research Institute, Fellow
- 2010: Austrian President, Austrian Cross of Honor for Science and Art
- New York Institute for the Humanities, Fellow

== Board memberships ==
- 2000–2004: Santa Monica Museum of Art
- Sun Valley Writers Conference
- Paul and Daisy Soros Fellowships for New Americans, Trustee
- New York Center for Ballet and the Arts

== Selected works and publications ==
Fluent in five languages, Holdengräber has also written essays and articles for journals in France, Germany, and Spain.

- Holdengräber, Paul (1995). Portrait of the Artist As Collector Walter Benjamin and the Collector's Struggle against Dispersion. Princeton University. OCLC 174013906.
- Mouffe, Chantal (1 January 1989). "Radical Democracy: Modern or Postmodern?". Social Text (21). Translated by Holdengräber, Paul: 31–45. doi:10.2307/827807. JSTOR 827807. OCLC 5552739238.
- Holdengräber, Paul (1 January 1992). "Between the Profane and the Redemptive: The Collector as Possessor in Walter Benjamin's "Passagen-Werk"". History and Memory. 4 (2): 96–128. ISSN 0935-560X. JSTOR 25618636. OCLC 5542798812.
- Holdengräber, Paul (December 2012). "Hans Ulrich Obrist". Surface (104). Archived from the original on 2016-10-25.
- Holdengräber, Paul (2 March 2013). "'Music Is Enough for a Lifetime But a Lifetime Is Not Enough for Music:' Van Cliburn (1934-2013)". The Huffington Post.
- Holdengräber, Paul (1 January 2014). "Interviews: Adam Phillips, The Art of Nonfiction No. 7". The Paris Review. Spring 2014 (208). ISSN 0031-2037.
- Holdengräber, Paul (22 August 2016). "Was the Twentieth Century a Mistake? A Conversation with Werner Herzog". Brick. No. 82.
