= Euphorium =

Euphorium was a site-specific theater installation produced by Antenna Theater that ran from 2000 to 2002 in San Francisco, California, London, England, and Black Rock City, Nevada.

The piece is based on Samuel Taylor Coleridge's poem, Kubla Khan. It was one of a series of installations Antenna Theater's director, Chris Hardman, describes as "walkmanology", in which audience members are guided through a set wearing headphone devices. For Euphorium, the audience members were given specially designed helmets that included not only stereo speakers, but also a periscope-like device by which they would view a diorama created on a room's ceiling as they walked slowly through the performance. Infrared triggers would initiate various mp3-encoded audio segments as they passed. The result was alternately described as an immersive multimedia performance, and "gothic theater".

Hardman had founded a successful company, Antenna Audio, by applying the innovation to self-guided museum tours, beginning with Alcatraz Island. The production also made use of a 19th-century optical technique known as "Pepper's Ghost", and various puppetry techniques, which Hardman learned in the 1970s as a member of Bread and Puppet Theater at Coney Island.

The initial production ran from 2000 to 2001 in an old army building in the Presidio of San Francisco that also included a mock opium den. In 2002-2003 Antenna partnered with Soho Theatre Company for a run in the cave-like basement of The Roundhouse in Camden Town, London.

== Reception ==
Critical response was mixed, with some complaining that the show's technology and effects were unrefined. The production was also criticized as being confusing, and showing a misunderstanding of the meaning of Coleridge's poem.
