= LIVE from the NYPL =

LIVE from the NYPL is a series of conversations and performances hosted at the New York Public Library. Since 2005, guests such as Seymour Hersh, Tina Brown, Spike Lee, Umberto Eco, Jay-Z, Salman Rushdie, Bernard-Henri Lévy, Werner Herzog, and many others have appeared in the Stephen A. Schwarzman Building to talk about subjects such as literature, art, popular culture, philosophy, and music. LIVE has partnered on programs with PEN World Voices Festival, The Dorothy and Lewis B. Cullman Center for Scholars & Writers, Maison Française of Columbia University, and Muslim Voices: Arts & Ideas Festival, among others. LIVE is directed by Paul Holdengräber, whose metaphorical goal for the program is to make the library's stone lions "roar."

== See also ==
- 92nd Street Y
- Paul Holdengräber
- Celebrity culture
