= Alex Kahn =

American artist

Alex Kahn is an American visual/performance artist and co-founder of the arts ensemble Processional Arts Workshop. He is most widely known for his creation of the large-scale puppet performance works that lead New York's Village Halloween Parade each year.

== Pageant puppetry and processional art ==
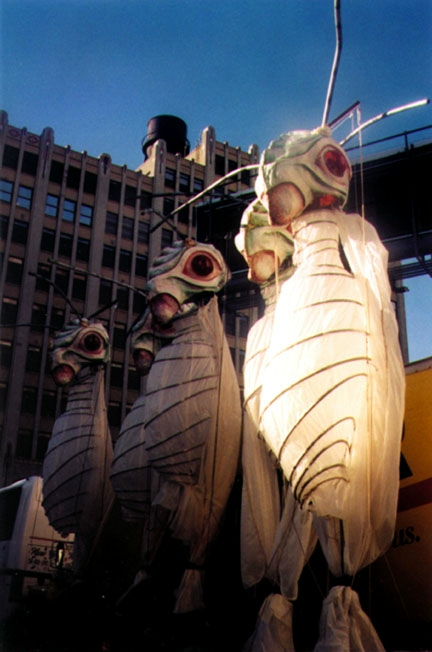
Luna Moths, from Alex Kahn's Metamorphosis, from the 1998 NY Village Halloween Parade

In 1998, Kahn and his partner, Sophia Michahelles, brought together an ensemble of artists, puppeteers, theatrical technicians, and performers to design the annual performances that lead New York's Village Halloween Parade. Originally named "Superior Concept Monsters", the group was incorporated as a non-profit in 2005 and renamed Processional Arts Workshop with a mission to create site-specific community-built processions, parades, and other open-space performances. These works are often developed through open community workshops that bring hundreds of volunteers together to build, rehearse, and ultimately perform cyclical pieces specifically for the parade. The performances typically incorporate elements of puppetry, sound, dance, costume/mask, lighting/projection and mobile architecture, an amalgam of mediums Kahn dubbed "processional art".

In addition to leading New York's Village Halloween Parade each year, Kahn's creations have appeared in venues nationally and internationally. His work, Metamorphosis, involving 20' tall pupating luna moths, officially opened the 2000 Henson International Festival of Puppet Theatre. In 2002, he and Michahelles initiated a midsummer pageant project in the Italian Alps village of Morinesio, drawing on local folklore and oral history to create a unique site-specific pageant. Inspired by the success of the now-annual tradition, they have seeded similar projects in diverse locales in Ukraine, Turkey, Italy, Texas, New York, and elsewhere. In 2006, Kahn was awarded a Fulbright Scholarship to Trinidad and Tobago, to study the artistic and cultural structures behind Caribbean Carnival and Trinidadian "Mas'", or costumed procession. More recent PAW works have included major commissions for Socrates Sculpture Park the NY Architectural League's Beaux Arts Ball, the PEN World Voices Festival, Houston's Buffalo Bayou Park, the Grand Opening of the High Line over Penn Rail Yards.

== Other works ==
Kahn has maintained an independent practice as a theatrical designer, printmaker, installation artist, and teacher. His interdisciplinary approach was strongly influenced by his experience as technical director of the Kitchen Performance Center during the 1990s. During this time he created lighting, objects, and effects for performance artists including John Jesurun ("Chang in a Void Moon"), Mikel Rouse ("Failing Kansas"), Roseanne Spradlin, Meredith Monk, Pauline Oliveros, and David Hykes. Kahn trained as a master printer under Robert Blackburn (artist) and chaired the Printmaking Department at Maine College of Art from 2000 to 2004. His Spam Cantos, a retooling of spam messages generated by Bayesian algorithms into a series of letterpress poems, appeared at the Maine Institute of Contemporary Art in 2008. In 2016, Kahn performed in the role of "choir-master" in "The Visitors" a video-work by Icelandic artist Ragnar Kjartansson, which has appeared at major museums around the world. His ongoing project, a fictional traveling museum called the Archive of the Synapse, has been exhibited nationally. San Francisco Chronicle art critic Kenneth Baker described the work as follows:

In a dark box several objects, including a broken fluorescent tube and a floppy disk, glow with touches of color under ultraviolet light. Beneath it, a backlit label explains that traces of a lost dimension called the Synapse persist in, for example, "the fractures along which things break inexplicably . . . the penny which flips only tails, even the virus-infested computer disk." Kahn's piece makes these traces visible. He makes sly analogies between mystic-scientistic cult thinking and new art's uneasy position in the culture at large. Most remarkably, Kahn reawakens us to a true spookiness of art through the fiction of an X-Files-style obsession.
