= Bread and Puppet Theater =

Puppet theater in Vermont, US

Coordinates: 44°41′03″N 72°10′41″W

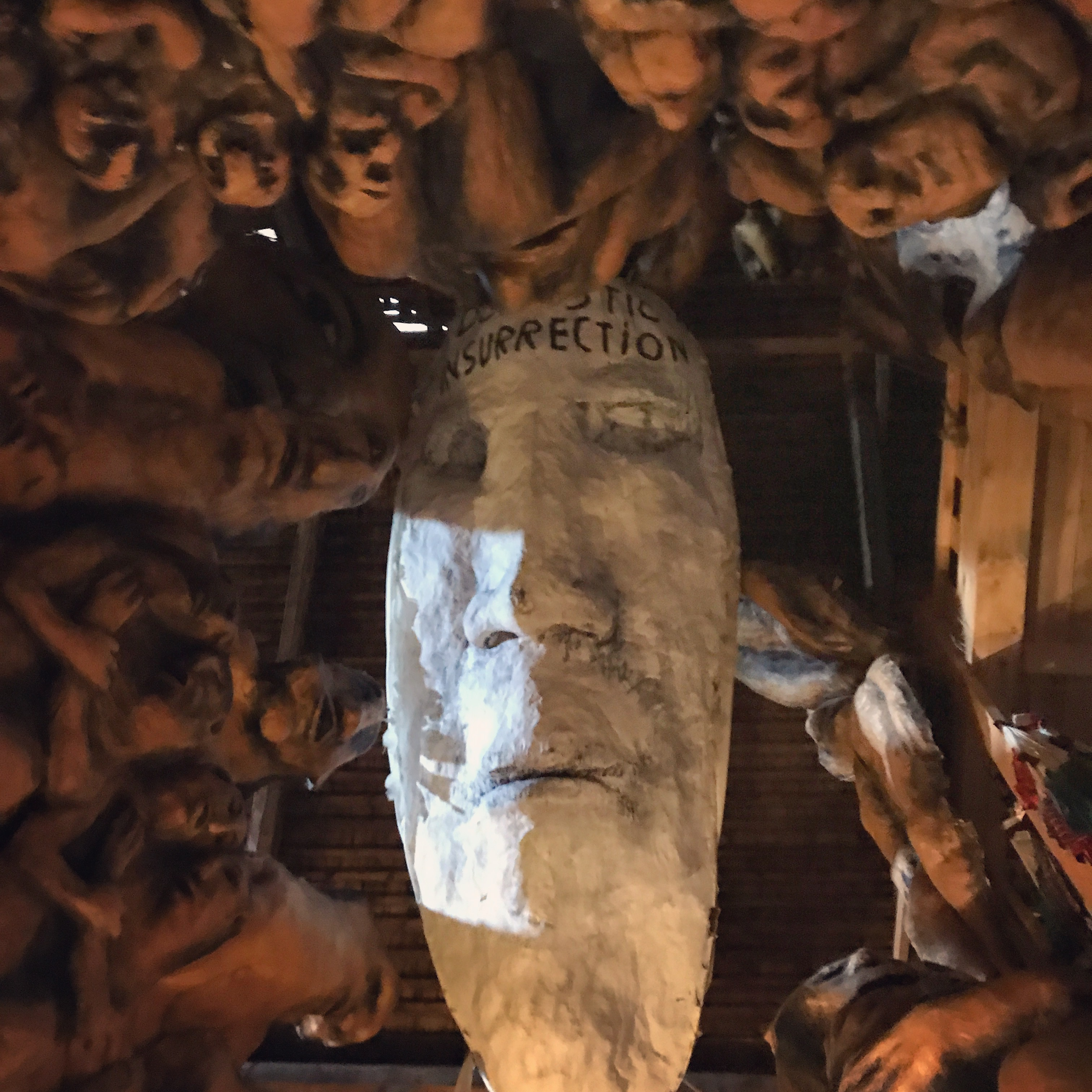
- Puppets on display in the Bread & Puppet Museum
- Formation: 1962–1963
- Type: Theatre group
- Location: Glover, Vermont
- Artistic director: Peter Schumann
- Website: breadandpuppet.org

The Bread and Puppet Theater (often known simply as Bread & Puppet) is a politically radical puppet theater, active since the 1960s, based in Glover, Vermont. The theater was co-founded by Elka and Peter Schumann. Schumann is the artistic director.

The name Bread & Puppet is derived from the theater's practice of sharing its own fresh bread, served for free with aïoli, with the audience of each performance to create community, and from its central principle art should be as basic as bread to life.

The Bread and Puppet Theater participates in parades including Independence Day celebrations, notably in Cabot, Vermont, with many effigies including a satirical Uncle Sam on stilts.

== History ==
Peter and Elka Schumann founded the Bread & Puppet Theater in 1963 in New York City. It was active during the Vietnam War in anti-war protests, primarily in New York City, prompting Time reviewer T.E. Kalem to remark in 1971, "This virtual dumb show is as contemporary as tomorrow's bombing raid." A Sicilian puppet show had inspired Schumann, and Bread & Puppet inspired other groups across the continent, including Gary Botting's Edmonton-based People & Puppets Incorporated, which in the early 1970s also used yards-high effigies to depict political themes and social commentary in radical street theater. In 1970 the theater moved to Vermont, first to Goddard College in Plainfield, and then to a farm in Glover where it remains. The farm is home to a cow, several pigs, chickens, and puppeteers, as well as indoor and outdoor performance spaces, a printshop, a store, and a large museum showcasing over four decades of the company's work. Bread & Puppet has received National Endowment for the Arts grants, awards from the Puppeteers of America, and other organizations.

In 1984 and 1985 they toured colleges with an indoor play, The Door, which told the story of "the massacre of Guatemalan and El Salvadorian Indians and the plight of refugees trying to escape through a diabolically opening and closing door to the North." With "only minimal use of the spoken word", the play made its points "with great simplicity and beauty".

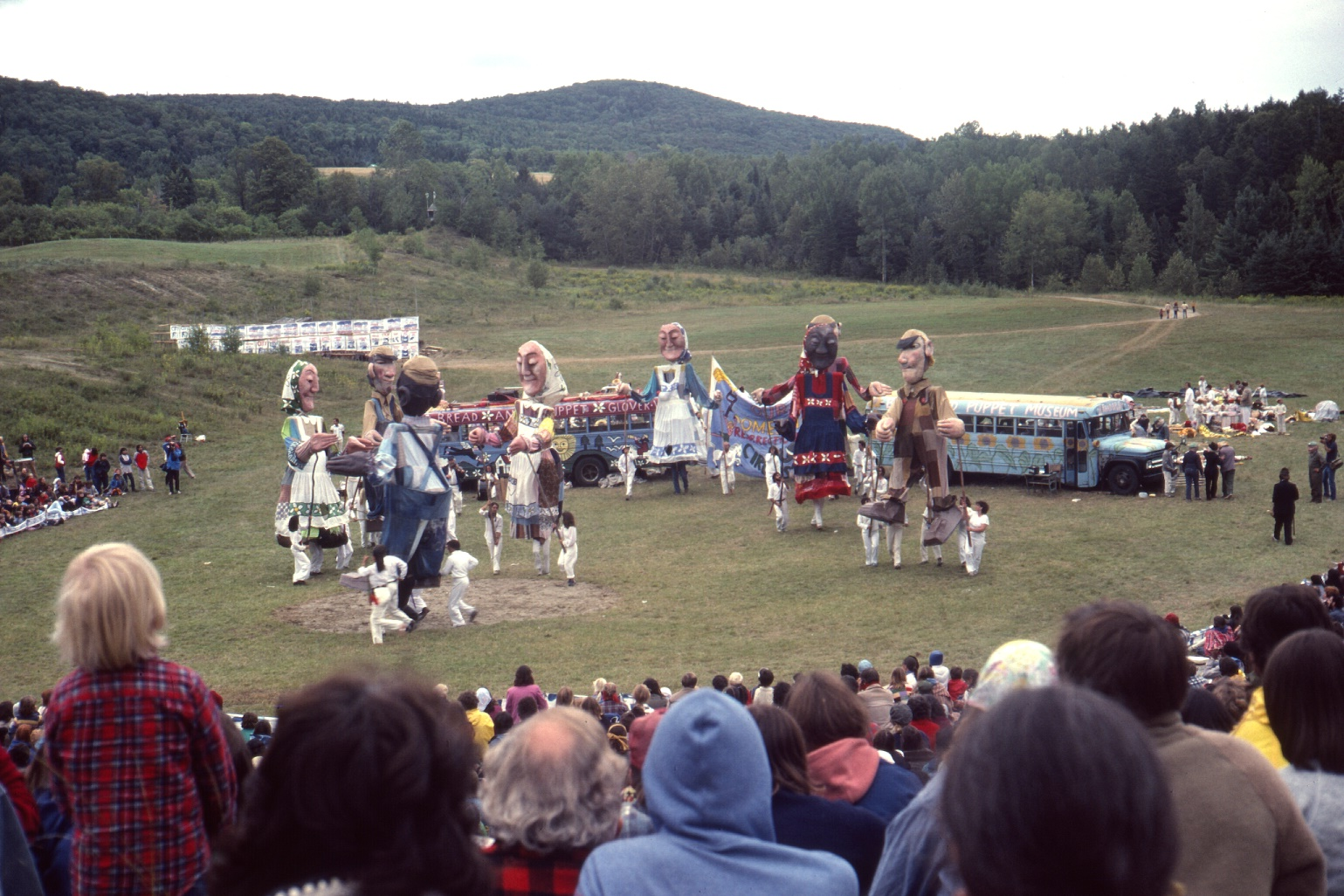
Our Domestic Resurrection Circus - mid-1980s

Until 1998, Bread & Puppet hosted its annual pageant and circus (in full, Our Domestic Resurrection Circus), in and around a natural amphitheater on its Glover grounds. In the 1990s, the festival began drawing crowds of tens of thousands, who camped on nearby farmers' land during the annual summer weekend of the pageant. The event became unmanageable, and concerned itself less with the theater's performance. In 1998, a man was killed by accident in a fight while camping overnight for the festival, forcing director Peter Schumann to cancel the festival. Since then, the theater offers smaller weekend performances all summer, and traveled around New York and New England, with occasional tours around the U.S. and abroad. The theater runs a program where apprentices help produce and act in performances. In New York City, Bread & Puppet performs at Theater for the New City during the holiday season each year.

In August 2021, at the age of 85, Elka Schumann suffered a stroke and died. She was buried in a pine grove, on the grounds of the theater's farm.

== Beliefs ==
=== "Cheap Art" and theater funding ===
The Bread & Puppet Theater operates under what they call the "Why Cheap Art" manifesto. This principle states that art should be accessible to the public, not "a privilege of museums & the rich". The theater is quoted as claiming: "art is not a business". Bread & Puppet productions are free or paid for by donation, and related art is for sale "for very little money".

The theater operates on a "shoestring" budget. This means that staff are historically paid as low as $35 a week (in 1977) and that many items used in the production of the theater, including clothing and raw puppet materials, are obtained second hand or by donation. The theater typically has been known to generate the funds necessary for production by going on tour. Although government grants are available to the theater, Schumann rejects the "absurdity" of grants for protest, insisting the lack of aid "leaves him freer to experiment". This attitude towards business led Schumann to disband the communal company of the theater in 1973 out of concern that the theater was coming too close to a "pattern of the professional theater". Disbanding the company gave Schumann "uncompromising control" over production.

"Cheap art" is said to be a core principle of the theater, and is reflected both in its ethics and in its aesthetics. Ethically, the theater is described as anticapitalist and generally is regarded as having a "hippie" viewpoint, Aesthetically, the theater is often described as "slapdash" or "unsightly", as well as modest and "distinctively homemade".

=== Causes ===
Specific causes supported by the theater include:

- Opposition to warfare
- Opposition to registering for the draft
- Opposition to the World Trade Organization
- Support of the shut down of Vermont Yankee Nuclear Power Plant
- Support for the Sandinista National Liberation Front revolution in Nicaragua (1979–1990)
- The Zapatista uprising of 1994
- The MOVE organization

== Works ==
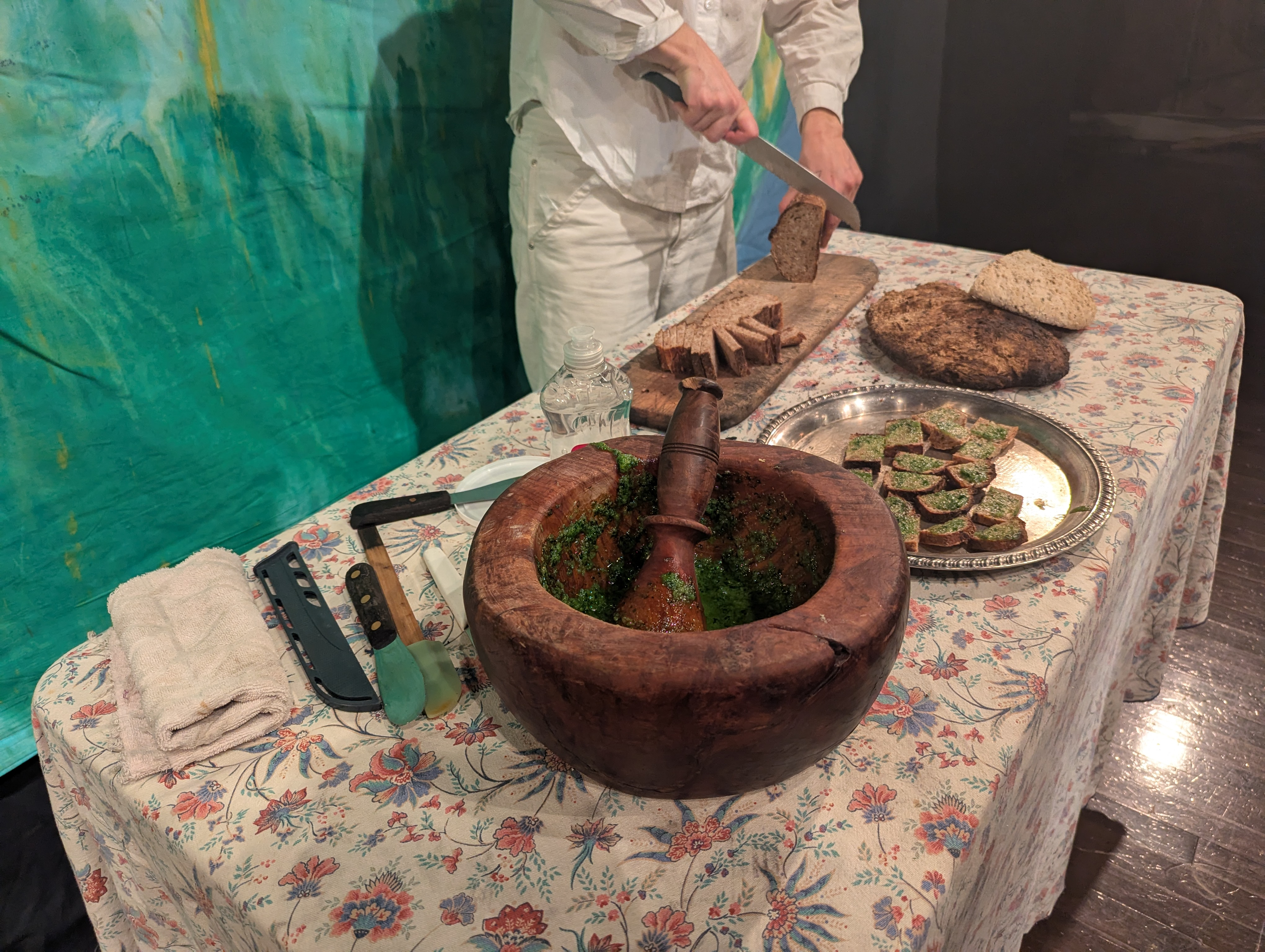
Rye bread with aioli being served after a performance

=== Selected performances ===
==== Fire (1965) ====
An hour long play that critiqued the ongoing war in Vietnam. It was dedicated to American protesters who died after setting fire to themselves and depicted life for Vietnamese villagers during the war.

==== Birdcatcher in Hell (1971) ====
A kyōgen that critiqued President Nixon's pardoning of soldiers involved in the My Lai massacre.

==== Stations of the Cross (1972) ====
Described by Larry Gordon, at the time the general manager of the company, as a "partially metaphoric [and] partially literal" rendering, Stations of the Cross was a contemporary interpretation of the New Testament story of Jesus' suffering on the way to his eventual crucifixion. Gordon provided the music direction for the production, the first time Sacred Harp music was performed at Bread and Puppet. Elka Schumann stated that the production was also a metaphor for the Cuban Missile Crisis.

==== Joan of Arc (1979) ====
A show that incorporated musical instruments and puppetry into a retelling of the story of St. Joan. This work also had a revival in 1999. Taiwan is the first Asian country to show the new version of Joan of Arc in 2009.

==== Mending the Sky/Bu Tian (1994) ====
A collaboration between Bread and Puppet Theater and the 425 Environmental Theatre in Taipei, Taiwan. The play focused on current pollution issues in Taiwan through references to traditional Chinese mythology. In particular, the show depicted the goddess Nüwa and called attention to the pollution of the Tamsui River in its first performances. Later performances focused on different geographical features affected by pollution depending on where the show took place. For example, the work focused on the Love River when it was shown in Kaohsiung, Taiwan. Overall, the effectiveness of this collaboration was called into question because many of the members of the 425 Environmental Theatre engaged in environmentally harmful practices (such as smoking) and a part of the show involved burning a puppet which created a considerable amount of black smoke. Still, the work received praise from critics for its relevant social messages.

==== Bread Baker's Cantata (1999) ====
Performed alongside the revival of Joan of Arc. It was a slow paced play that depicted an old woman's last day on Earth using singers and actors.

==== Combined Insurrection/Resurrection Services (2020) ====
Their first production after the COVID-19 pandemic forced them to cancel a planned tour. Featuring cantastoria-style paintings, skeletal dancers and a "fiddle lecture", the performance was critical of the public response to the virus, as well as police brutality. It highlighted themes of uprising and grief, including "lamentations" for those killed by the virus, and for George Floyd

=== Other performances ===
Shows not described above are shown in chronological order in the tables below, by decade of their first performance.

Years	Theatrical Performances	Pageants and Circuses
1963–1969	The Story of the World, The Christmas Story, The King Story, Eating and Drinking in the Year of Our Lord, Leaf Feeling the Moonlight, The Pied Piper of Harlem, The Puppet Christ, Chicken Story, The Gray Lady Cantata #1,`Wounds of Vietnam, The Dead Man Rises, A Man Says Goodbye to his Mother, The Cry of the People for Meat, Theater of War, Blue Raven Beauty	
1970–1979	The Fourteen Stations of the Cross, The Gray Lady Cantata #2-#6, That Simple Light May Rise out of Complicated Darkness, Hallelujah, Laos, Harvey Mcleod, The Revenge of the Law, Attica, Jepthe, Ishi, The Last of the Indians, Jesu Meine Freude, White Horse Butcher, Passion, Masaniello, The Lamentations of Jeremiah the Prophet, Carmina Burana, Ave Maris Stella	Our Domestic Resurrection Circus: Homage to Ishi; Bicentennial; Oswald Von Wolkenstein
1980–1989	The Story of Bread, Histoire Du Pain, Swords and Ploughshares, Woyzeck, Venus Rising From the Water, The Thunderstorm of the Youngest Child, Fear, Diagonal Man-Theory, Josephine the Singer, Mozart Requiem, Ex Voto I-III, Daily News Nativity, Bach's Christ Lag in Todesbanden, Farmer's Dream?, Stravinsky's Symphony of Psalms, The Evils of Power, Uneasy Equilibrium of 2 Societies,	Our Domestic Resurrection Circus: The Fight Against the End of the World; St. Francis; Domestic Insurrection; Central America and Liberation Theology; Nicaragua and Bach; Archetypical Slogan Circus; The Constitution?; The Principle of Hope; The State of the Planet
1990–1999	Uprising of the Beast, President and Chair, Nativity 1992, Axe and Angel, Stone Soup, Fly or Die, Oedipus Rex, B2 Bomber Show, Delivery, Insurrection Mass with a Funeral March for a Rotten Idea, The Proletarians, The Penny Opera, City of Brotherly Love Passion Play	Our Domestic Resurrection Circus: Theatrum Mundi; The Triumph of Capitalism; One Dimensional Man; Karl Marx & Frogs; Maximum Security Democracy; The Green Man Circus; Gates of Hell; Humdrum Glorification Kaboodle Performances
2000–2009	The Paper Mache Cathedral of the Seven Basic Needs, Red Zone of Genoa Oratorio, Radical Cheese Festival, Public Participation Uprising, Depleted Uranium Cantata, How to Turn Distress Into Success, Full Spectrum Domination, Enemy of Nature Oratorio, Imminent Attack, Light Shining in Glover, World on Fire, Daughter Courage, Shoes, Passion Play of the Correct Moment, Battle of Terrorists and Horrorists, Ice Cold Reality Under The Feet of the Occupier, Lubberland: No, No, Yes, Guantanamo, Lubberland: World Can't Wait Dances, Storm Office, We sh Cantastoria, Sourdough Philosophy Cabaret, Dirt Cheap Money Cabaret, Tear Open The Door of Heaven, This, Requiem for Haiti Relief, Lubberland: 13 Dirt Floor Cathedral Dances	Solomon Grundy Circus, Circus of the Possibilitarians, Victory over Everything Circus and Pageant, First World Insurrection Circus, Upside World Arise Circus, National Circus of the Correct Moment, Cardboard Celebration Circus, Victory Circus and Pageant, Welcome Circus, Everything is FIne Circus, Divine Reality Comedy Circus, Sourdough Philosophy Circus, Dirt Cheap Money Circus and Pageant, Mud Season Circus with Danville Elementary
2010–2019	Shatterer of Worlds, A Thing Done in A Seeing Place, Piero della Francesca, Captain Boycott, The Horizontalists, Public Access Center for the Obvious Presents: History, Public Access Center for the Obvious Presents: The Situation, Underneath the Above Show #1, Dust, The Seditious Conspiracy Theater Presents: A Monument to Political Prisoner Oscar Lopez Rivera, Disordering the Existing Order of Life Oratorio, Faust 3, The Gates of Unfinished Life, TINA, The Honey Let's Go Home Opera, Post-Apocalypse for ¾ Empire, Mahmoud Darwish, The Basic Byebye Show, Dignity Milk, Water Protectors' Parade, Prison Demolition and Composting Parade, Out of Joint Hamlet, Nieve en las Cordilleras, Or Else, Life Little Life, Zero Degrees, Gaza, Diagonal Life: Theory and Praxis, The Diagonal Yes, The Diagonal Man Imperative, Man on Fire, Emma, The Extiction Rebellion Parade, The Essential Furthermore, The Bad Bedsheet Existibility Show,	Decapitalization Circus, Man=Carrot Circus, The Complete Everything Everywhere Dance Circus, Pageant of the Possibilitarians, Total This and That Circus, Nothing Is Not Ready Circus, Gaza Emergency Pageant, Tar Sands Manifesto Pageant, Overtakelessness Circus, Comet's Passage Over Reality Pageant, Whatforward Circus, Onward Pageant, Our Domestic Insurrection Circus & Pageant, The Grasshopper Rebellion Circus & Pageant, Grasshopper Rebellion Circus & Naked Truth Pageant, Diagonal Life Circus and Normality Pageant
2020–2023	The Trident Show, Paper Man and Paper Woman Go To the Moon, Parking Lot Dance Company, Declaration of Light, The History of Laughter, The Persians, Finished Waiting, The Theory of Our Needs, Ophelia, The University of Majd, Inflammatory Earthling Rants (with Help From Kropotkin), Idiots of the World Unite Against the Idiot System, Hypocrisy Democracy Dance Company Shows, Mother Dirt Church Services, The Heart of the Matter	Driveway Circus, Winter Pageant, Our Domestic Resurrection Circus & Pageant, Apocalypse Defiance Circus

=== Books and publications ===
In addition to the theater, some of the Bread & Puppet puppeteers operate the Bread & Puppet Press, directed by Elka Schumann, who is Peter Schumann's wife (and granddaughter of Scott Nearing). The press produces posters, cards and books on the theater's themes as well as other forms of "cheap art".

Publications from the Bread & Puppet Press include:

- Cheap art manifestos
  - 10 Purposes of Cheap Art
  - Importance of Cheap Art
  - Why Cheap Art?
- Comics
  - 40 How Tos
  - Courage
  - Life and Death of Charolette Solomon
  - Off to Lubberland
  - Planet Kasper Volume I
  - We Grass

== Notable contributors ==
Notable writers and performers who have participated in the theater, include

- Children's theater performer Paul Zaloom.
- Writer Grace Paley.
- Artist and writer Suze Rotolo

== Conflicts ==
=== 2000 Republican National Convention ===
Bread & Puppet volunteers were among the 79 people arrested at a warehouse in Philadelphia during the 2000 Republican National Convention. The Associated Press reported the scene of the "SWAT-style" raid was broadcast live by news helicopters. Years later, the AP explained there "was tense talk (later proved unfounded) of terrorist plots being hatched in the 'puppetista' headquarters, of bomb building and anarchist-fueled mayhem". Its report did not include the police's side of the story.

"A couple of our folks were down there, helping to build puppets", said Linda Elbow, company manager for Bread & Puppet. "The cops went into the studio ... arrested people, and took the puppets. So, now, puppets are criminals."

=== 2001 Halloween Parade ===
The Bread & Puppet Theater is a regular participant in New York's Village Halloween Parade, noted for its use of giant puppets. In 2001, Bread & Puppet did not march in the parade. The theater's plans that year included a presentation protesting the War in Afghanistan. The Halloween parade was to occur fifty days after and 1.5 miles away from the September 11, 2001, attack on the World Trade Center. It was this attack which was the pretext for starting the war which Bread & Puppet Theater was protesting, and the company's "anti-war stance" reportedly "already placed it at odds with some New Yorkers", according to Dan Bacalzo of TheaterMania.com. Many of the parade's macabre elements were suspended that year by its director Jeanne Fleming. It was not known until October 25 whether it would even take place.

Linda Elbow commented, "We certainly weren't saying 'Hooray for the terrorists.' We were saying, 'Look what you're doing to the people of Afghanistan.'" An unattributed quote in Bacalzo's report — "What you're bringing, we don't want" — suggests it was the group's selection of material that was unwelcome, not the group itself. The report did not make it clear how the decision was made, or who made it; the incident was included as secondary background material in a piece publicizing an upcoming Bread & Puppet show. Fleming, who was not interviewed by Bacalzo (but is quoted as if she was), says that Bread & Puppet was not "disinvited", adding that it was she who first invited the company to march in the parade when she took over as organizer.

In December 2001 the theater returned to New York with The Insurrection Mass with Funeral March for a Rotten Idea: A Special Mass for the Aftermath of the Events of September 11th. It was presented at Theater for the New City, and billed as "a nonreligious service in the presence of several papier-mâché gods". "Insurrection masses" are a common format for the Bread & Puppet Theater, as are such "funerals", though the "rotten" ideas change.

== Critics' comments ==
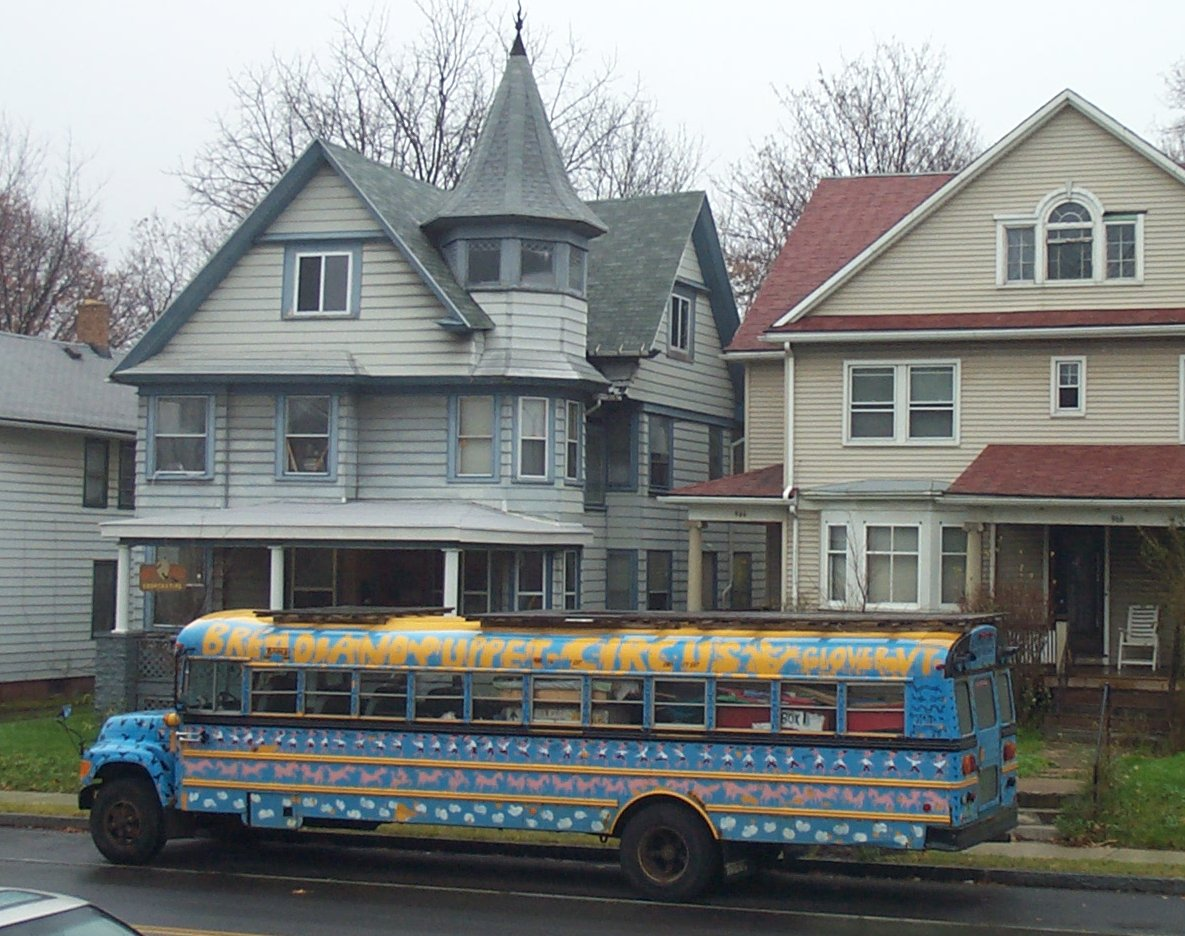
The Bread and Puppet bus on tour, parked in front of the Ant Hill Cooperative in Rochester, New York.

Writers who praised Bread & Puppet include historian Howard Zinn, who cited its "magic, beauty, and power", and poet and NPR commentator Andrei Codrescu, who wrote: "The Bread & Puppet Theater has been so long a part of America's conscious struggle for our better selves, that it has become, paradoxically, a fixture of our subconscious."

The theater's protestations of the Vietnam war and message of peace generally received positive television coverage, as noted in peace focused magazine WIN. Keith Lampe, in WIN, also positively comments on the theater's 1966 anti-war demonstration by commending Peter Schumann's "concern for movement", "sound", and "appearance".

In a 2015 criticism of the theater's production The Seditious Conspiracy Theater Presents: A Monument to the Puerto Rican Political Prisoner Oscar Lopez Rivera, Gia Kourlas described the show as "patchy", at times "more cute than pointed", and seemingly "preaching to the converted" in an article for the New York Times.

In 2023, Jon Kalish of VTDigger noted that the theater attracted some controversy over their ambivalent position on the 2022 Russian invasion of Ukraine. Founder Peter Schumann stated that the conflict was the result of American warmongering and opposed U.S., European Union, and NATO military aid to Ukraine. Schumann also accused the Western media of ignoring Ukraine's neo-Nazi presence, an accusation Holocaust historian Michael Berenbaum disputed. Several theater members questioned Schumann's response, with former member Ian Thal stating that Schulmann's "reflexive anti-Americanism overrules any sympathy he might have for the Ukrainians. It renders Schumann unwilling to criticize Putin’s government or geopolitical ambitions”.

== Influence ==
The Bread & Puppet Theater has a visual reference in the 2007 Julie Taymor film Across the Universe. The movie replicated characters such as Uncle Fatso, Washer Women, White Ladies, and the many armed Mother head. The Bread & Puppet Circus Band also has a reference in the costumes of the circus band during "Being for the Benefit of Mr. Kite!". The difference between the real life costumes and the ones made for the movie is the real life ones are red and black, whereas in the movie they are white and black. The Bread & Puppet Theater is in the film's credits.

In her 2008 memoir A Freewheelin' Time: A Memoir of Greenwich Village In The Sixties, New York painter and illustrator, Suze Rotolo, notes she worked a fabrication job with Bread & Puppet early in 1963 near Delancey Street, on the Lower East Side of Manhattan. She described Peter Schumann as a "very sincere and committed man" and a "true visionary".

In his memoir, Chronicles: Volume One, Bob Dylan mentions Peter Schumann's presence at a party held in honor of fellow folk singer, Cisco Houston. In his description, Dylan made reference to the Bread and Puppet Theater play, Christmas Story.

In the Czech Republic, a puppet troupe named Buchtky a Loutky (transl. Cake and Puppets) was formed in Prague in the 1990s. Their name is an allusion to the Bread and Puppet theater.

== See also ==
- Cantastoria
- In the Heart of the Beast Puppet and Mask Theatre
- Paperhand Puppet Intervention
