= Larry Gordon (musician) =

American singer (1945–2021)

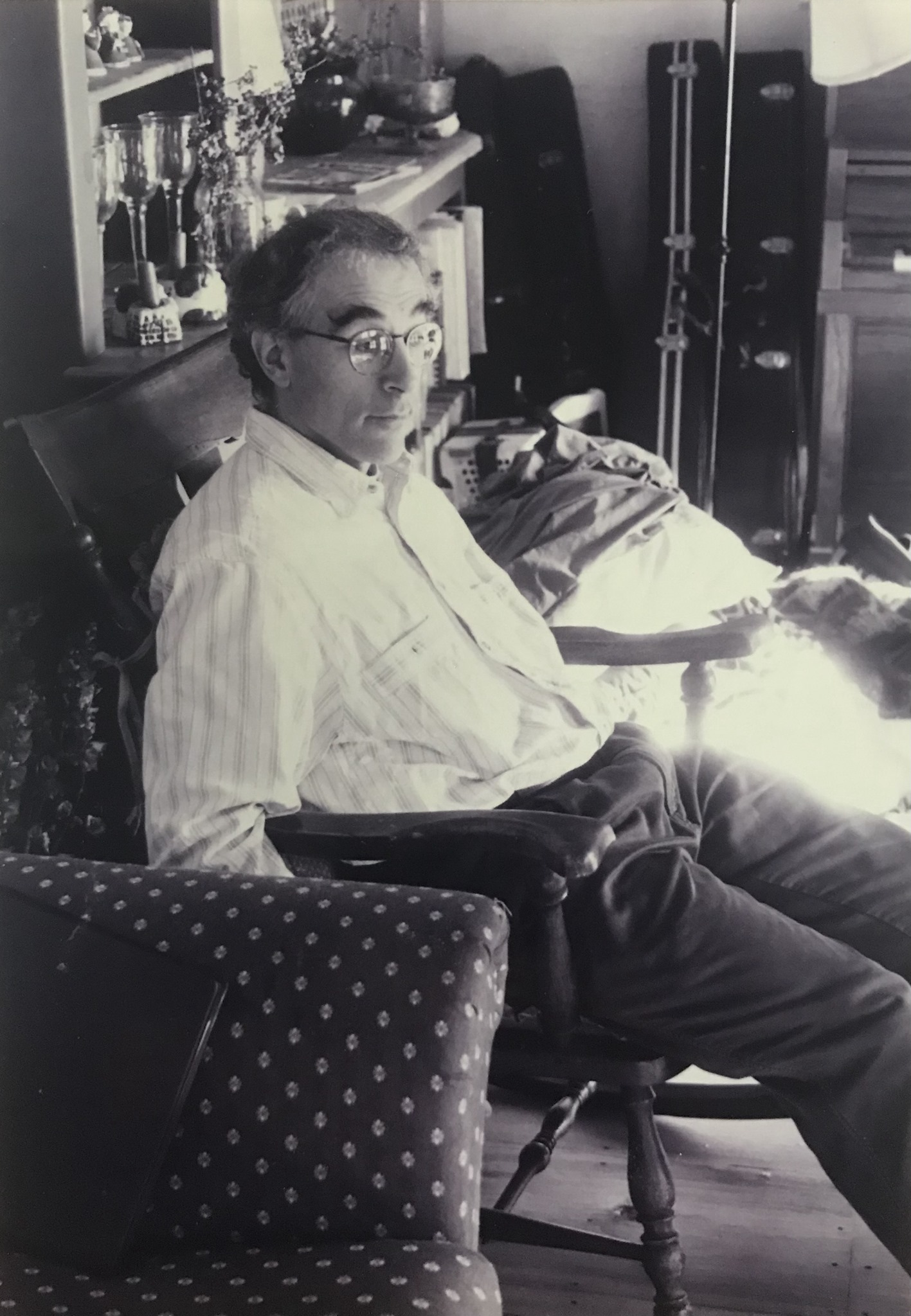
- Larry Gordon at home in Marshfield, ca. 1995
- Born: Lawrence Edward Gordon; July 3, 1945; Rome, Georgia, U.S.
- Died: November 9, 2021 (aged 76); Burlington, Vermont, U.S.
- Occupations: Musician, teacher

Lawrence Edward Gordon (July 3, 1945 – November 9, 2021) was an American singer, teacher, composer and conductor, based in Marshfield, Vermont. He was the co-founder and director of numerous musical ensembles, most notably the Onion River Chorus in 1978 and Village Harmony in 1989. Gordon has been credited with bringing American shapenote music, a predominantly Southern tradition from the mid-19th century on, back to New England in the 1970s.

== Early life and political activism ==
Larry Gordon was born in Rome, Georgia, on July 3, 1945, to Jewish parents who were living in the American South to work for the USO during WWII. Gordon's father was William "Bill" Gordon (né Wolf Gordonovich), an activist in left-wing causes born in Shumskas (a Jewish shtetl in what was then Poland). His mother was Helen Gordon (née Appelman), after whom the Helen Gordon Child Development Center at Portland State University is named. He had two siblings, the historian Linda Gordon and Lee David Gordon. He grew up mainly in Colorado and Oregon, graduating from high school in Portland, OR in 1963. Gordon's parents were members of the Communist Party, and he described his family of origin as "a left-wing radical family . . . so it was a very political household with many visitors [who would] talk about politics and community organizing." Gordon attended Swarthmore College for two years, then transferred to Suffolk University.

While at Swarthmore, Gordon became involved in Students for a Democratic Society, a nationwide American organization active through the 1960s. After graduating from Suffolk University in 1968, Gordon worked for Urban Planning Aid, Inc. (1966–1982), an organization in Boston with the stated goal of "offer[ing] technical and informational assistance and promot[ing] transfer of skills to low income community and workplace groups in Eastern Massachusetts around issues of housing, industrial health and safety, [and] media access". Gordon's particular project in 1968 and 1969 was working with the organization to stop the proposed inner belt expressway that UPA believed would destroy many inner-city neighborhoods.

== Cooperatives and Bread & Puppet ==
After a friend from SDS moved to Plainfield, Vermont, in the late 1960s, Gordon visited him there and became involved in helping to build what would become the New Hamburger Cooperative, and lived there at the co-op for about 15 years. Gordon continued to be politically active in left-wing causes through SDS, mostly in areas around community organizing; his wing of the SDS was interested in local affairs (such as housing and welfare issues), and was critical of another wing of the organization that placed its focus on anti-war activities, leading to the formation of the Weathermen.

While in Vermont, Gordon's musical activities flourished. With the Word of Mouth Chorus, he began what would be a long-term involvement with Bread & Puppet, a politically radical puppet theater. A friend recalls Gordon introducing Sacred Harp music to the group, which embraced it enthusiastically. Bread & Puppet's 1972 performance of Stations of the Cross was the first time shape note singing surfaced in a Bread and Puppet production and in the years since it has been a frequent element in the group's performances.

Gordon also worked with the Plainfield Food Co-op (in Plainfield, Vermont) and the Cherry Hill Cannery (in Berlin, Vermont).

== Musical career ==
=== Word of Mouth Chorus ===
In the early 1970s, Gordon formed the Word of Mouth choral group. Between 1973 and 1976, the group refined their focus, increasing their performance activity and continuing to promote Sacred Harp music, and published a collection called the "Early American Songbook" (1975) in standard, non-shaped notation.

The ensemble toured the southern United States and released an album, Rivers of Delight: American Folk Hymns from the Sacred Harp Tradition, in 1978.

Word of Mouth's entrée into the world of southern Sacred Harp singing was not entirely without controversy. In her 2017 dissertation on Sacred Harp music as performed outside of the Southern American milieu, Ellen Lueck writes:

Larry Gordon's willingness to perform Sacred Harp for formal audiences has not gone without criticism from those who firmly believe that the repertoire should be enjoyed only within an open community context, or from those who adhere to the trope of "it's just not done" in the American South. [Ethnomusicologist] Kiri Miller devotes an entire subsection of her book to a critique of the Word of Mouth Chorus and their 1979 album Rivers of Delight where she essentially claims a hijacking of The Sacred Harp for the purposes of a personal project.

Nevertheless, Lueck writes, "it is still important to consider the positive impact that the professional presentations of the Word of Mouth Chorus had on Sacred Harp singing in New England, and subsequently across the Atlantic." In fact, had Gordon and Word of Mouth not engaged in the musical/cultural exchange they did, "many of the people who were first attracted to Sacred Harp singing through the Word of Mouth Chorus' [album] Rivers of Delight may never have found a pathway to the inclusive and thriving singing network that is present today."

=== Onion River Chorus ===
The Onion River Chorus was founded around 1976–1978 by Gordon and the late Brian Webb, with Gordon managing programming, and Webb serving as the primary conductor for the choir's first ten years. The Onion River Chorus is a non-auditioned community chorus, and has historically made use of a wide-ranging and eclectic repertoire, including pieces by Baroque composers such as Jan Dismas Zelenka and Marc-Antoine Charpentier, as well as Hieronymus Praetorius, and contemporary works by Vermont composer Don Jamison (among others).

=== Village Harmony ===
Village Harmony, a 501(c)(3) non-profit, is an umbrella organization comprising a diverse range of choral singing activities, including Northern Harmony, a semi-professional touring ensemble with a shifting membership. Gordon founded Village Harmony in 1989, and its first summer camp was held the following year. Each year since 1990, Village Harmony organizes multiple sessions of summer camps (both touring and residential sessions) for teenagers, largely in northern New England and in Oregon. Since 1994, Village Harmony has also organized international sessions for adults. Drawing on Gordon's extensive and eclectic musical expertise, as well as that of the organization's co-director Patty Cuyler (who joined in 1994), Village Harmony has taught and performed music from a diverse range of musical regions and traditions, most notably Bulgaria, Macedonia, Georgia, South Africa, Appalachia, Corsica, and more. Village Harmony has been described as "the leader in engaging young people in traditional [folk, vernacular, and art] music".

Village Harmony was the subject of a chapter in the book A Different Voice, A Different Song: Reclaiming Community through the Natural Voice and World Song (Bithell, 2014), which "explores the history and significance of the natural voice movement and its culture of open-access community choirs, weekend workshops, and summer camps"; Gordon was mentioned in his capacity as a director and an important emotional figure for many teenagers involved in Village Harmony:

Often, some of the participants will already know one another: they may sing in the same choir or have attended the same workshops at home, or they may have met on previous overseas tours. Many of the younger singers grew up with Village Harmony's youth camps and feel very much a part of the Village Harmony family, often viewing Patty [Cuyler] and Larry [Gordon] as surrogate parent figures.

=== Publications, compositions and releases ===
Gordon was a well-known teacher and popularizer of Sacred Harp music, both traditional and contemporary. However, Gordon wrote only one song in the Sacred Harp tradition, a setting of Dylan Thomas' celebrated poem Do not go gentle into that good night.

The following is not an exhaustive list.

==== Audio recordings ====
- Honor to the hills, 1988
- Emerald stream : music from the shape note tradition, old & new, 1992
- Northern harmony, 1992
- Heavenly meeting : European tour, fall 1994, 1994
- Endless light : spiritual songs by a new generation, 1997
- USA tour 1999, 1999
- Crossing boundaries : USA tour 2000, 2000
- Where everything is music : USA tour 2002, 2002

==== Publications ====
- The Word of Mouth early American songbook, ca. 1976
- Emerald stream : twenty-one original shape-note compositions, 1992
- Northern harmony : plain tunes, fuging tunes and anthems from the early and contemporary New England singing traditions, 2012
- The best of Village Harmony: a 25th anniversary collection: traditional & composed polyphonic songs from America, the Balkans, Caucasus Georgia, Ukraine, Corsica & More, 2014

== Death and legacy ==
On November 1, 2021, Gordon was found after an apparent bicycle accident near his home in Marshfield, Vermont. For the following nine days, he was under the care of doctors at UVM Medical Center. A Facebook group was set up for members of the Village Harmony community to support each other and to share stories about and memories of Gordon; by November 11, 2021, the group had more than 1,000 members.

When it became clear that recovery was not possible, Gordon's family and loved ones made the decision to remove him from life support, and he died shortly thereafter, on November 9, at the age of 76. A vigil and gathering was held at Gordon's home in Marshfield, and some 200 people who were unable to attend in person sent notes to be placed in his casket before cremation. Other vigils and memorials were held concurrently elsewhere, including Brattleboro, Boston, Western Massachusetts, New York, Washington, D.C., the San Francisco Bay area, Seattle, England, Germany and South Africa. An on-air memorial program on Vermont Public Radio aired on November 14, 2021.

Gordon is remembered by friends, students, and colleagues as a man of contrast and complexity. He was a singer whose "loud, booming bass ran counterpoint to his casual dress in concert and low-key, down-home manner with audiences", a strong leader whose authority stemmed from his apparently total faith in those he taught, his belief that "anyone could do what[ever] he needed them to do."
