= Processional Arts Workshop =

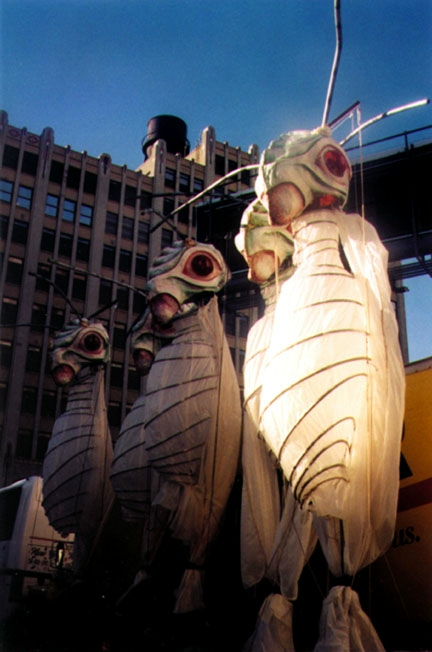
Luna Moths created by Alex Kahn for 1998 NY Village Halloween Parade

Processional Arts Workshop (PAW) is an ensemble of performing artists and theatrical technicians founded in 1998, devoted to pageant puppetry and processional art. They are also known by the name Superior Concept Monsters. They are best known for creating the large-scale puppet performances that lead New York's Village Halloween Parade.

== History ==
Founded by NY Halloween Parade designers Alex Kahn and Sophia Michahelles in 1998, PAW creates large-scale site-specific performance works specifically for the medium of procession, involving giant puppets, mobile scenography, shadow and projection, and other visual elements. These works often involve hundreds of volunteers who build and rehearse in community workshops, and then perform in the final event. Beyond their work for the Halloween Parade, PAW has travelled to communities around the world to create site-specific processions and parades based on local themes. Drawing on regional cultures, oral history, and current sociopolitical concerns, the group encourages local residents to participate at every stage of production from initial design to final performance. thus empowering them to identify and preserve narratives that uniquely define “local” in their own community. To date they have created events in Italy, Trinidad, Maine, Texas, New York, and other locales. Other recent PAW works have included major commissions for Socrates Sculpture Park the NY Architectural League's Beaux Arts Ball, the PEN World Voices Festival, Houston's Buffalo Bayou Park, the Grand Opening of the High Line over Penn Rail Yards.

In 2001, PAW's work achieved widespread attention when Michahelles designed a giant silk puppet of the Phoenix – the mythical bird that rises from its own ashes – for the NY Halloween Parade, as a hopeful tribute to New York's resilience after 9/11. The puppet was built and performed by witnesses to the terrorist attacks on the World Trade Center, and garnered national and international media attention.

PAW has received numerous awards and grants and residencies, including a CEC Artslink Grant for work in Kyiv Ukraine, a Mid-Atlantic Arts Foundation Artist in Communities Grant (2006), a Roman J Witt Visiting Artist Fellowship at University of Michigan in Ann Arbor, and an Artist Residency at Caribbean Contemporary Art in Port of Spain, Trinidad and Tobago. In addition, PAW co-founder Alex Kahn was awarded a Fulbright Fellowship to study the traditions and social structures of the Trinidad Carnival.

== See also ==
- New York's Village Halloween Parade
- Alex Kahn
- Sophia Michahelles
