= Ralph Lee =

American puppeteer (died 2023)

Ralph Minor Lee (July 9, 1935 – May 12, 2023) was an American puppeteer and theatre artist. His work focused on the design and use of masks in theatre and performance. The majority of his productions took place outside of traditional performance venues, included parades, pageants, celebrations, and outdoor theatrical performances. Masks and large puppets were central to his productions, which aimed to make artistic experiences accessible to all members of the community.

== Early life and career ==
Lee started making puppets as a child growing up in Middlebury, Vermont. He graduated from Amherst College in 1957, and studied dance and theater in Europe for two years on a Fulbright Scholarship.

Upon returning to the United States and moving to New York City, Lee acted on Broadway and off-Broadway, in regional theaters, and as a member of The Open Theatre, directed by Joseph Chaikin, from 1967 to 1973.

During this time, he contributed to several off-off-Broadway productions at La MaMa Experimental Theatre Club. In 1967 he did set design for Leonard Melfi's Niagara Falls. He then performed in a production of two plays by Maria Irene Fornas, A Vietnamese Wedding and The Red Burning Light of the American Way of Life, in 1969. He then directed and designed a production of Nancy Fales' Ark in 1974, which featured music by Sonelius Smith. In 1976, he made the masks and props for a production of Adrienne Kennedy's A Rat's Mass at La MaMa. A decade later, he made the masks for the 1986 production of Orfei composed by Genji Ito, choreographed by Maureen Williams, and directed by Ellen Stewart, the founder of La MaMa. In 1988, he made the masks for The Summer Face Woman, written by Dave Hunsaker and based on an Aleut myth about the Bering Sea.

During the late 1960s and early 1970s, he also started making masks, unusual props, puppets, and large figures for theater, dance, and television productions. In 1974, while teaching at Bennington College, Lee staged his first outdoor production. The production took place all over the campus and featured giant puppets and masked creatures, with a large cast of performers and musicians.

== Village Halloween Parade ==
In 1974, Lee organized the first Greenwich Village Halloween Parade, which he directed until 1985. The parade began in the courtyard of the Westbeth Artists Community. During his time as director, the parade grew from a small community event built around his masks and figures into one of New York City's major events. The parade grew to attract over 250,000 people and media attention from around the world.

Lee received a 1975 Village Voice Obie Award and a 1985 citation from the Municipal Arts Society for his work on the parade. In 1993, he was inducted into the City Lore People's Hall of Fame. Under his direction, the parade was funded by the New York City Department of Cultural Affairs (1974–1985), the National Endowment for the Arts (1977–1982), the Kaplan Fund (1977, 1978, 1983), the New York State Council on the Arts (1979–1984), Con Edison (1980–1985), the Public Theater (1983, 1984), American Express (1983–1985), and the Association for a Better New York (1985).

== Mettawee River Theatre Company ==
In 1976, Lee became artistic director of the Mettawee River Theatre Company. Mettawee's productions are based on creation myths, trickster tales, Sufi stories, legends, and folklore from many other cultures. Most productions take place outdoors, in parks, public lawns, fields, and town greens, and incorporate masks, puppetry, visual effects, and live music. Each summer, Mettawee gives over twenty-five performances in upstate New York and New England, traveling to rural communities that have no other exposure to live theater.

The company has also appeared at many festivals, including the 1991 New York International Festival of the Arts, the New Theater Festival in Baltimore, the Universiade in Edmonton, Alberta, the National Puppetry Festival in San Luis Obispo, California and Bryn Mawr, Pennsylvania, and on a month-long tour of Alaska. Since 1984, the company has been finishing their summer tours with a performance in the garden of the Cathedral of St. John the Divine in New York City.

=== Notable productions ===
In 1986, the company performed The North Wind at La MaMa. The work was based on a Yupik Eskimo story, as written by Dave Hunsaker and with music by Barbara Pollitt. The company at that time consisted of Valois Mickens, Willie C. Barnes, Lenny Bart, Christine Campbell, Shelley Fine, and Elliot Scott.

Heart of the Earth, which was developed by Lee with the company in 1993, was then produced by INTAR Theatre at the 1994 Henson Festival. The production was then presented at INTAR and toured to local schools with the support of the Lincoln Center Institute. The script was written by Cherríe Moraga, with a musical score by Glen Velez. The production received funding from Opera America, the National Endowment for the Arts, and the Henson Foundation.

Mettawee's 1999/2000 production of Molière's Psyche was presented at the Henson International Festival of Puppetry Arts in New York City and at the New Jersey Performing Arts Center in Newark.

=== Funding and awards ===
The company has received funding from the National Endowment for the Arts from 1980 to the present and the New York State Council on the Arts from 1978 to the present. The company has received additional grants from the New York City Department of Cultural Affairs (1980 and 1981), Meet the Composer (1984–1986, 1988), the Henson Foundation (1985, 1987, 1994, 2000, 2001, 2004, 2005, 2007), the Merck Family Fund (1986), the Bickford Foundation (1991–2008), the Agostino Foundation (2000–2007), and the Fan Fox and Leslie R. Samuels Foundation (2000–2008).

Mettawee has received an Obie, two Citations for Excellence from UNIMA-USA, and two American Theatre Wing design awards. In 2023, Lee, alongside Mettawee managing director Casey Compton, was honored with a Lifetime Achievement Obie Award.

== Other work ==
=== Work with Mayan writer's collective ===
Lee went to San Cristóbal de las Casas, Chiapas in February 1989 to work with the Mayan writer's collective Sna Jtz ‘Ibajom. He was invited by Robert Laughlin, anthropologist with the Smithsonian Institution. He then traveled there annually for twelve years, each year creating a new theater piece with the group, drawn from their folk material or the current political situation. The pieces have been performed extensively, within that community as well as throughout Mexico, in Honduras, Florida, and at the Mexican Museum and Cultural Center in Chicago.

In January 2001, he directed a bilingual adaptation of their 2000 play El Origin de Maiz. The show was produced by the outreach program of the La Jolla Playhouse for an eight-week tour of schools and community centers throughout southern California. Lee has received grants from Fideicomiso Para la Cultura Comision (1993), Arts International (1992, 2002) and DTW's Suitcase Fund (1992) for this work.

=== Cathedral of Saint John the Divine ===
Lee was an artist-in-residence at the Cathedral of St. John the Divine since 1984. At the cathedral, he directed and designed the Mummer's Play for the Boar's Head Festival, directed plays for the Feast of Saint Francis, and provided staging for Johann Sebastian Bach's St. John Passion and the visual finale for Paul Winter's Carnival. His giant creatures roam through the cathedral as the finale for the annual Halloween event. The Wildman, a co-production of the Mettawee River Company and the cathedral, was performed at the Cathedral in the fall of 1987.

=== Additional projects ===
Lee's creations were a central part of the Bronx Zoo's annual Easter celebrations from 1980 to 1984. He also created giant figures for the New Year's Eve celebrations in Central Park (1974–1980) and the Fourth of July festivities on the steps of Federal Hall National Memorial in 1975. Since 1993, his creations have been featured at events at the New York Botanical Garden in the Bronx, including Halloween on Haunted Walk (1993–2005) and The Little Engine That Could (1995–present).

Lee created masks for major theater and dance companies, including the Metropolitan Opera, the New York City Opera, the New York City Ballet, the Joffrey Ballet, the Phoenix Theater, the Waverly Consort, the Living Theater, Shari Lewis, the Ensemble for Early Music, the New York Shakespeare Festival, Shakespeare & Company, Erick Hawkins Dance Company, Jean Erdman's Theater of the Open Eye, Saturday Night Live (the land shark) and Yoshiko Chuma's School of Hard Knocks.

== Exhibitions, teaching, residencies, and recognition ==
From February through May 1998, the New York Public Library for the Performing Arts at Lincoln Center presented a retrospective exhibition of Lee's masks, puppets, giant figures, and scenic elements, attracting record-breaking crowds to the gallery. Other exhibits of his work have been presented at the Lower Adirondack Regional Arts Council in Glens Falls, New York (2004), The Taft School in Watertown, Connecticut (2003), the World Financial Center Gallery in New York City (1999), and the City University Graduate Center Mall in New York City (1976 and 1987).

In addition to Bennington College, Lee has taught at Amherst College, Hampshire College, Smith College, the Jewish Theological Seminary, Union Theological Seminary, and the Boys and Girls Republic, and has been on the faculty of New York University since 1988.

Lee had residencies at the Coalition of Immokalee Workers in Immokalee, Florida, Colgate University, Hamilton College, the Navaho Reservation in Rock Point, Arizona, the University of Rio Grande, and the University of North Carolina at Greensboro. In 2007/2008, Lee was the Jim Henson artist-in-residence at the University of Maryland in College Park.

Lee received several awards, including a 2003 Guggenheim Fellowship, a 1996 New York State Governor's Arts Award, and a 1996 DTW Bessie Award. His individual grants have included Dancing in the Streets (1996), Art Matters (1995), the Beard's Fund (1980), and a CAPS Grant (1975).

== Death ==
Lee died in Manhattan on May 12, 2023, at the age of 87.
