= Sophia Michahelles =

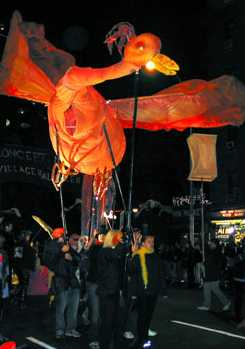
Sophia Michahelles of Processional Arts Workshop designed this incandescent baby phoenix puppet for New York's Village Halloween Parade in 2001, as a response to the attack on the World Trade Center.

Sophia Michahelles (born c. 1975) is one of the two chief artists and puppeteers of Processional Arts Workshop, makers of pageant puppets and other processional art in upstate New York. She works closely with co-director Alex Kahn. The couple's work, under the informal moniker "Superior Concept Monsters" has been commissioned each year since 1998 to lead New York's Village Halloween Parade, the largest puppet parade and street-pageant of its kind in the United States, drawing two million spectators.

Many of the giant rod puppets (or "pageant" puppets) created by Michahelles and Kahn, are lit from the inside, making them suitable for night parades. They are performed by teams of puppeteers. For the 1998 Halloween parade, Michahelles worked with Kahn and his team to build five 20-foot caterpillar puppets (designed by Kahn) which transformed into giant Luna moths. In 2001, as a response to the attack on the World Trade Center, Michahelles herself designed an incandescent baby phoenix puppet for the New York parade, as a symbol of rebirth from the ashes.

Michahelles has also worked in collaboration with master puppeteer Basil Twist. She performed in Twist's Off-Broadway show Symphonie fantastique (1998 and 2004) presented at Dodger Stages. The Obie Award-winning work is a water ballet of 180 puppets choreographed to the five movements of Hector Berlioz's 1830 orchestral work. Unseen during the performance, she and the other five performers "...emerge from behind the scenes for their curtain calls... Each is wearing a wetsuit, looks exhausted, gets naked and is soaked from head to toe," according to theater critic Matthew Murray of TalkinBroadway.com.

Since 2002, Michahelles and Kahn have taught a summer workshop in pageant puppetry and processional art in the mountain village of Morinesio, located in the Italian Alps. They draw on local history as an inspiration for the artistic themes of the puppet creations and folk festivals that are part of the workshop. This process of creating locally derived, site-specific processions has become a central aspect of their work, and in 2005, they formed a non-profit entity, Processional Arts Workshop, to further pursue community-based projects.
