= New York's Village Halloween Parade =

Parade held every Halloween in New York

Attracting over 2 million spectators, the annual NYC Village Halloween Parade in Greenwich Village, Manhattan, is the world's largest nighttime parade and Halloween celebration, with its roots in New York's gay culture.

Village Halloween Parade

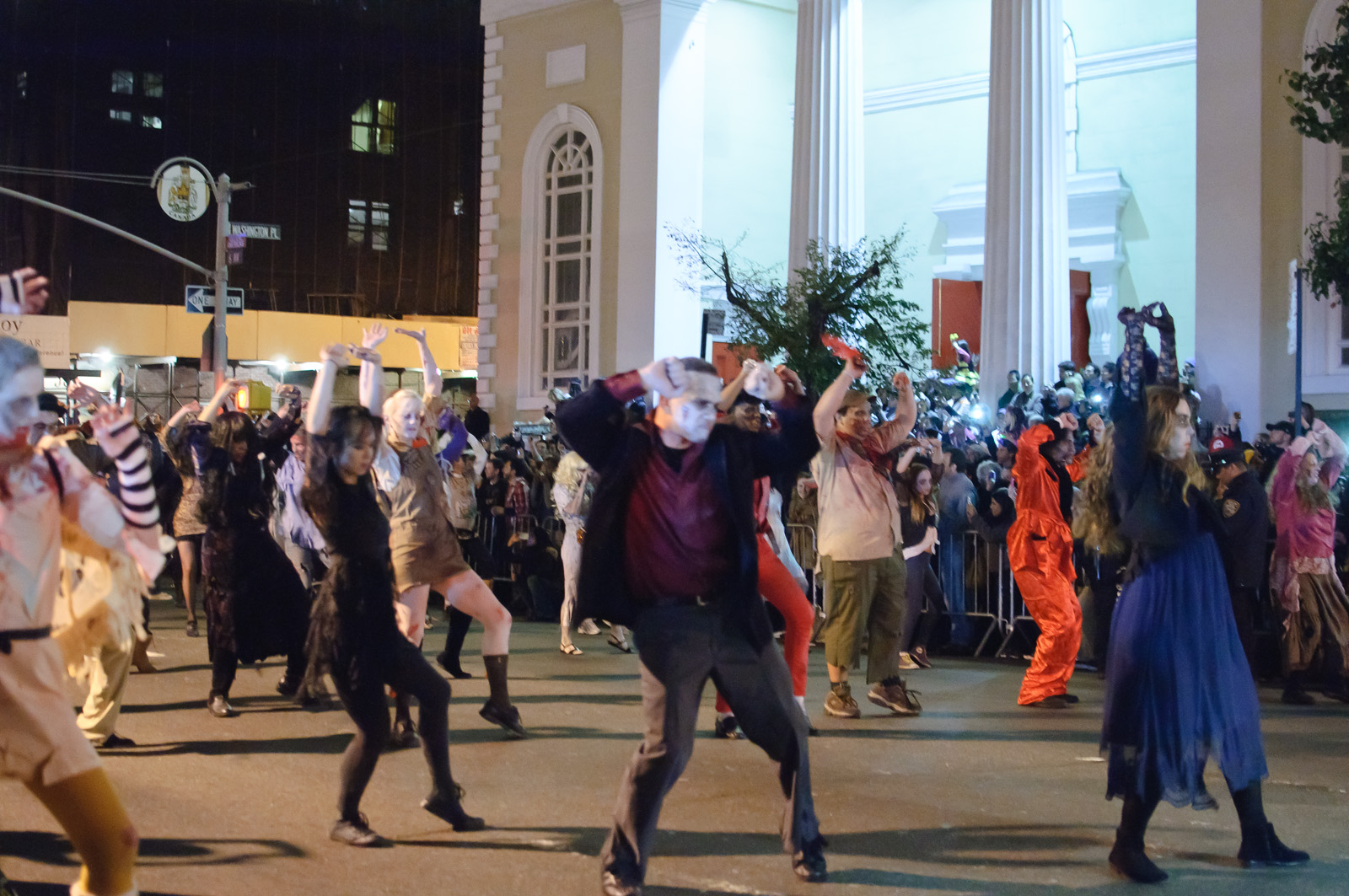
Paraders perform zombie dance from Michael Jackson's Thriller video in 2011

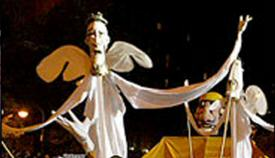
Tall rod puppets, a signature of the parade

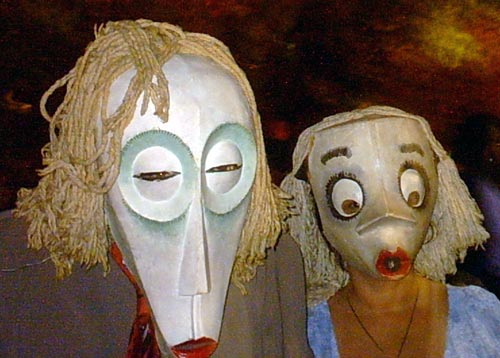
Papier-mâché masks reflect the evening's atmosphere

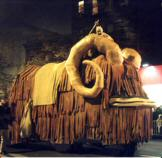
A Tusken Raider rides a mammoth-sized Bantha puppet designed by Oliver Dalzell

The Village Halloween Parade is an annual holiday parade held on the night of Halloween, in the Greenwich Village neighborhood of New York City. The parade, initiated on October 31, 1974, by Greenwich Village puppeteer and mask maker Ralph Lee, is the world's largest Halloween parade and the only major nighttime parade in the United States. The parade reports itself to have 50,000 "costumed participants" and 2 million spectators. The parade has its roots in New York's queer community.

The Village Halloween Parade has been called "New York's Carnival." The parade is largely a spontaneous event as individual marchers can just show up in costume at the starting point without registering or paying anything. The parade's signature features include its large puppets, which are animated by hundreds of volunteers. The official parade theme each year is applied to the puppets. In addition to the puppets, more than 50 marching bands participate each year. In addition, there are some commercial Halloween parade floats.

The official route, on Sixth Avenue from Spring Street to 16th Street in Manhattan, is 1.4 miles long (the distance from the gathering spot on Sixth Avenue from Canal Street to Spring Street adds another 0.2 miles). The parade usually starts at 7 PM and lasts for about two to three hours.

== Historical timeline ==
In 1974, an informal parade of puppets for children was organized by Ralph Lee of the Mettawee River Theatre Company around his residence of artists in the Westbeth Artists Community. The next year, the parade went from Jane Street at the Hudson River to Washington Square Park. About 200 adults and children participated. The 1975 parade was produced by the Theatre for the New City (which at the time was in Westbeth). Lee and the Theatre won Obie Award for the production. The 1975 parade grew to 1,500 participants. The new management introduced more adult elements into the event including a Halloween ball after the parade. Organization of the parade was formally handled by a non-profit organization starting in 1976.

In 1977, the route was changed to 10th Street between Greenwich Avenue to Fifth Avenue and still ending in Washington Square. A devil sat at the top of the Washington Square arch where it released balloons and slid down a wire into the fountain. The year also saw the first appearance of giant spider on the Jefferson Market Library. The parade continued to start at Westbeth until 1983. Two years later, with crowds expanding to 250,000, the route was moved from side streets to Sixth Avenue from Spring Street to 22nd Street (although in practice the gathering point was further south at Canal Street and the northern point would be shortened to 16th Street. The change in route ended the connection to Washington Square Park. Jeanne Fleming became the Artistic and Producing Director.

In 1990, New York University and Manhattan Community Board 2 begin hosting an unrelated Children's Halloween Parade in Greenwich Village in the afternoons in Washington Square. Sophia Michahelles and Alex Kahn directors of Processional Arts Workshop become the official designers of the parade's puppets in 1998, and the following year, Basil Twist designed the spider that currently appears on the Jefferson Market Library.

Less than seven weeks after the September 11 attacks in 2001, the parade was broadcast worldwide and was an indication that New York was bouncing back. The parade was led by a giant puppet of a Phoenix rising out of the ashes. Noticeably missing from the parade was Bread and Puppet Theater which had been a political staple of the parade but was protesting the new War in Afghanistan. Earlier the Bread and Puppet contingent consisted of five blocks of its giant puppets. Similarly, less than 8 weeks after Hurricane Katrina in 2005, more than 8,000 storm evacuees attended a funeral procession tribute as part of the parade. In 2010, Haitian Carnival Artist Didier Civil created Haitian carnival figures as a tribute to victims of the 2010 Haiti earthquake.

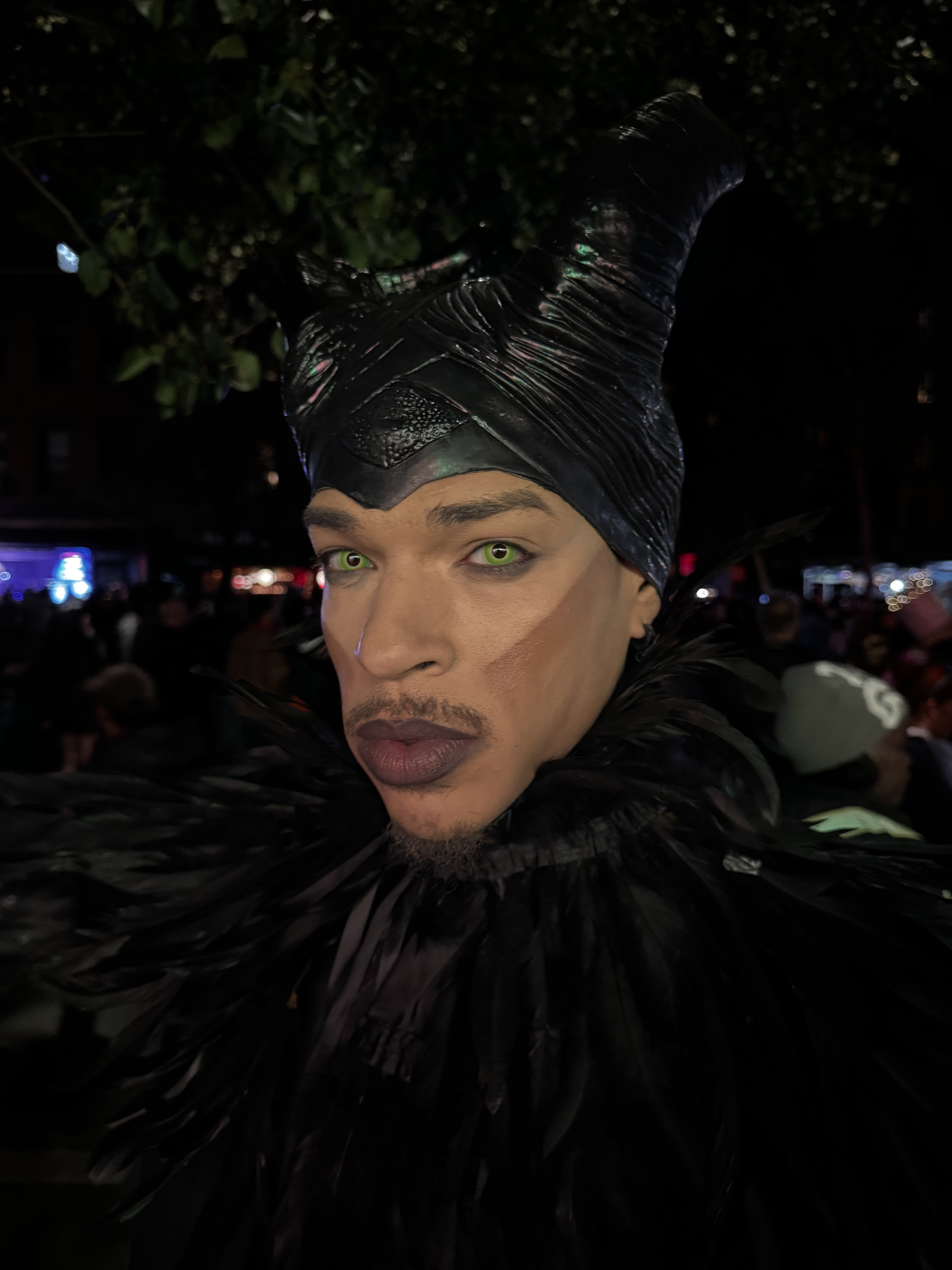
Maleficent at the 2025 NYC Halloween Parade

The parade was cancelled for the first time in the aftermath of Hurricane Sandy in 2012, which had heavily damaged coastal New York City and had left Greenwich Village without electricity during the parade time. The next year, a Kickstarter campaign to cover costs of the 2012 closing saved the parade from permanently closing. The campaign raised $56,000, surpassing its goal of $50,000.

Less than four hours after eight people were killed six blocks west of the parade route in the 2017 New York City truck attack, the parade proceeded as scheduled. Both Mayor Bill de Blasio and Gov. Andrew Cuomo marched in the parade.

In 2020, during the COVID-19 pandemic in New York City, the parade was canceled for the first time in eight years. The parade's organizers cited concerns that social distancing would be impossible with the high crowds that the parade typically saw.

In its 51st year in 2024, the parade featured over 65,000 participants and 1.5 million spectators. The procession moved on 6th Ave from Canal Street to 15th Street. The theme was meow and celebrated the inner cat lady in everyone. The director of the Village Halloween Parade was Jeanne Fleming. The parade was led by the grand marshal, Tony Award-winning actor André De Shields, best known for his role as Hermes in the Broadway musical Hadestown. In 2025, the grand marshal was City Harvest, a nonprofit dedicated to fighting poverty by rescuing fresh produce and delivering it to New Yorkers for free. The theme was potluck and was about everyone bringing something to the table, such as art, costume, food, or joy. Jeanne Fleming continued as the director of the parade.

== Theme ==
In 2001, the parade presented a work of puppetry that would become celebrated for its artistry, and remembered in the city's history. After the September 11, 2001 attacks, events citywide and nationwide were being either scrapped or postponed. Organizers believed the parade would give the city a much-needed emotional release, reform the community, and help it to begin the healing process. They felt that this was the most positive way they, as artists, could serve the city at such a desperate time. "This is the meaning of the Dancing Skeletons that always lead the march: they know better than anyone what they have lost, and so they dance this one night of the year to celebrate life," Fleming told CNN in an interview.

By September 15, Fleming had scrapped the old theme and chosen a new one. Although no one was certain the parade would take place, designer Sophia Michahelles conceived of a new theme, Phoenix Rising, to galvanize the spirit of New York in the wake of the tragedy. A giant puppet of a phoenix, the mythical bird that rises up out of its own ashes, was created by Michahelles in the workshop of Official Parade Puppeteers Superior Concept Monsters. The animated creation was mechanically configured to spread its wings and rise out of fiery ashes, represented by flickering lanterns lifted on poles, encircling the parading figure. On October 25 the parade received final authorization to go ahead. In light of the widely established community relationships which Fleming had cultivated, and the parade's long tradition, Mayor Rudy Giuliani insisted it go on.

== Cultural impact ==
The parade has been studied by leading cultural anthropologists. According to The New York Times, "the Halloween Parade is the best entertainment the people of this City ever give the people of this City." "Absolutely anything goes," says USA Today. "Be prepared to drop your jaw."

The history of the parade is both celebrated and eulogized by Lou Reed in the song Halloween Parade on his 1989 album New York. The Village Halloween Parade also themed in the video game Tycoon City: New York, published in 2006.

== Gallery ==
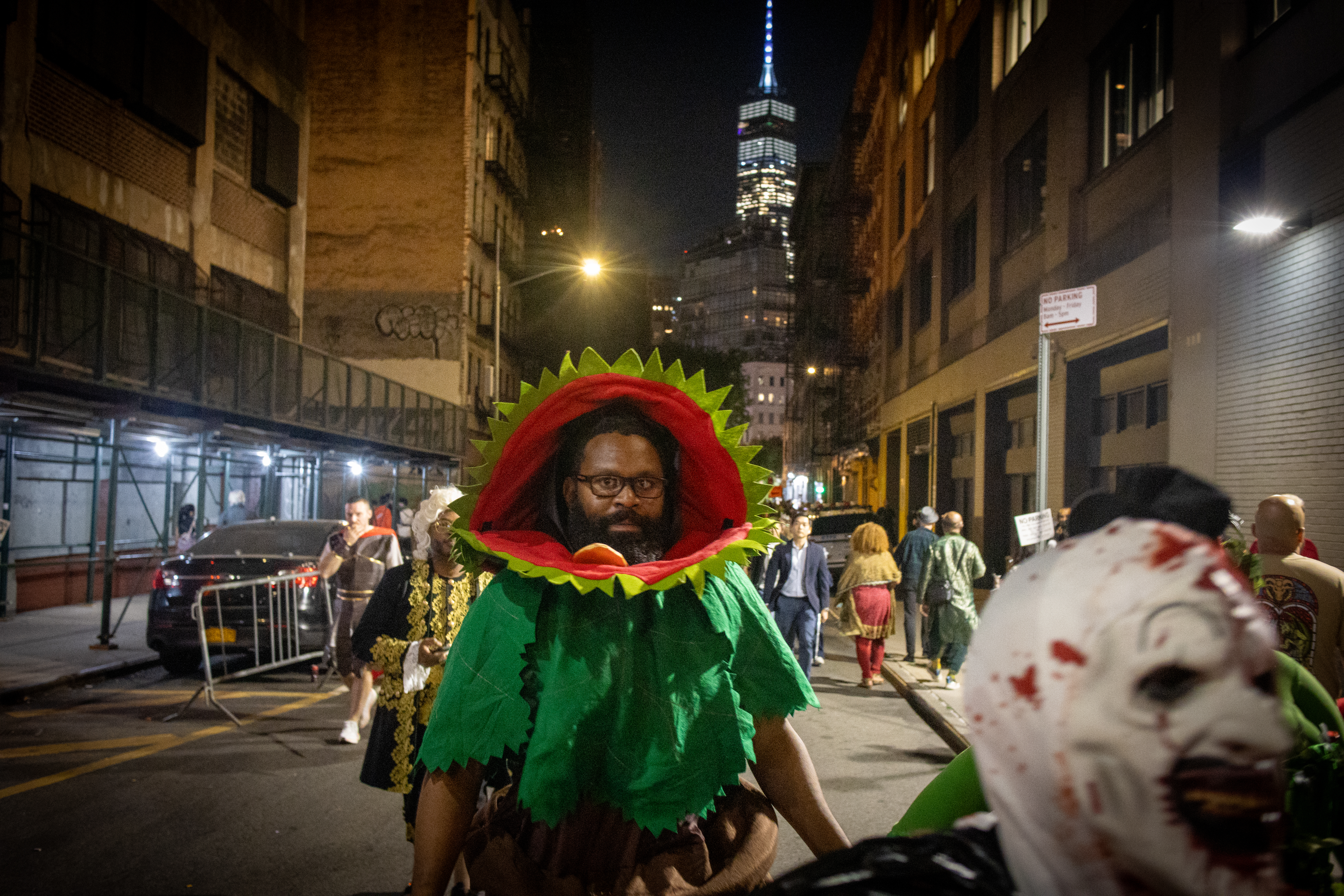
Spring and Thompson streets, 2024.

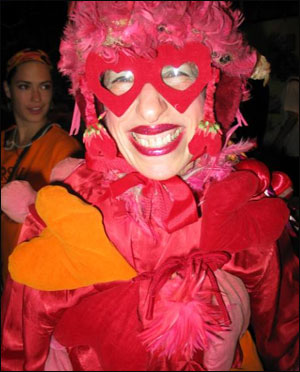
Parade participant (2004)

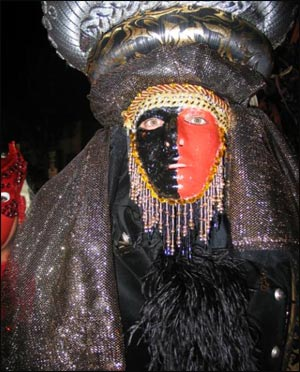
Exotic masquerader in beads, feathers, headdress, and face paint (2004)

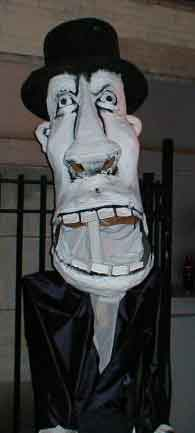
A masquerader poses in front of a wrought iron fence in historic Greenwich Village

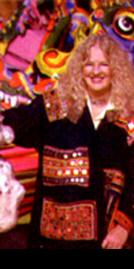
Celebration artist Jeanne Fleming, the parade's artistic and producing director

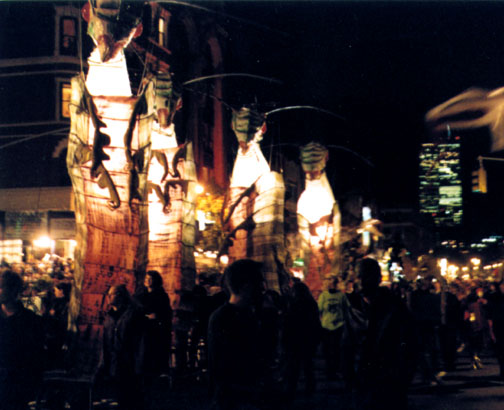
Twenty-foot illuminated caterpillars — animated pageant sized puppets designed by Alex Kahn of Processional Arts Workshop — transform Manhattan's Greenwich Village in 1998 (the former Twin Towers are prominently seen in the background)

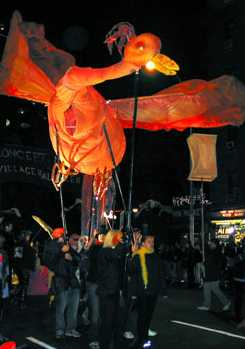
An incandescent baby phoenix conceived and designed by Sophia Michahelles of Processional Arts Workshop rises from fiery ashes to new life in 2001, after the September 11 attacks

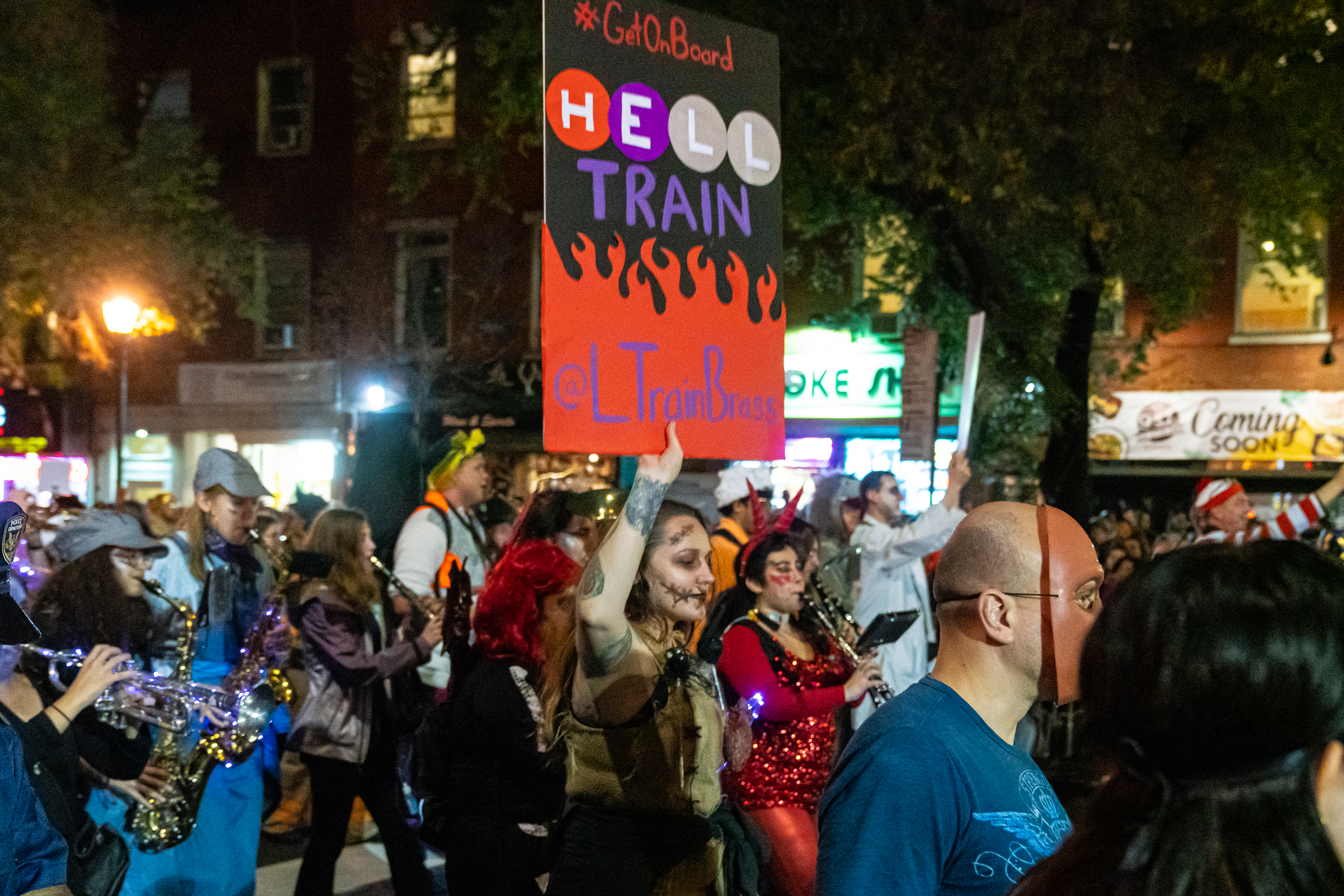
The L Train Brass Band (2019)
Many bands, including the Princeton University Band, the Queer Big Apple Corps, and the L Train Brass Band, pictured here in the 2019 parade, march in the parade every year.

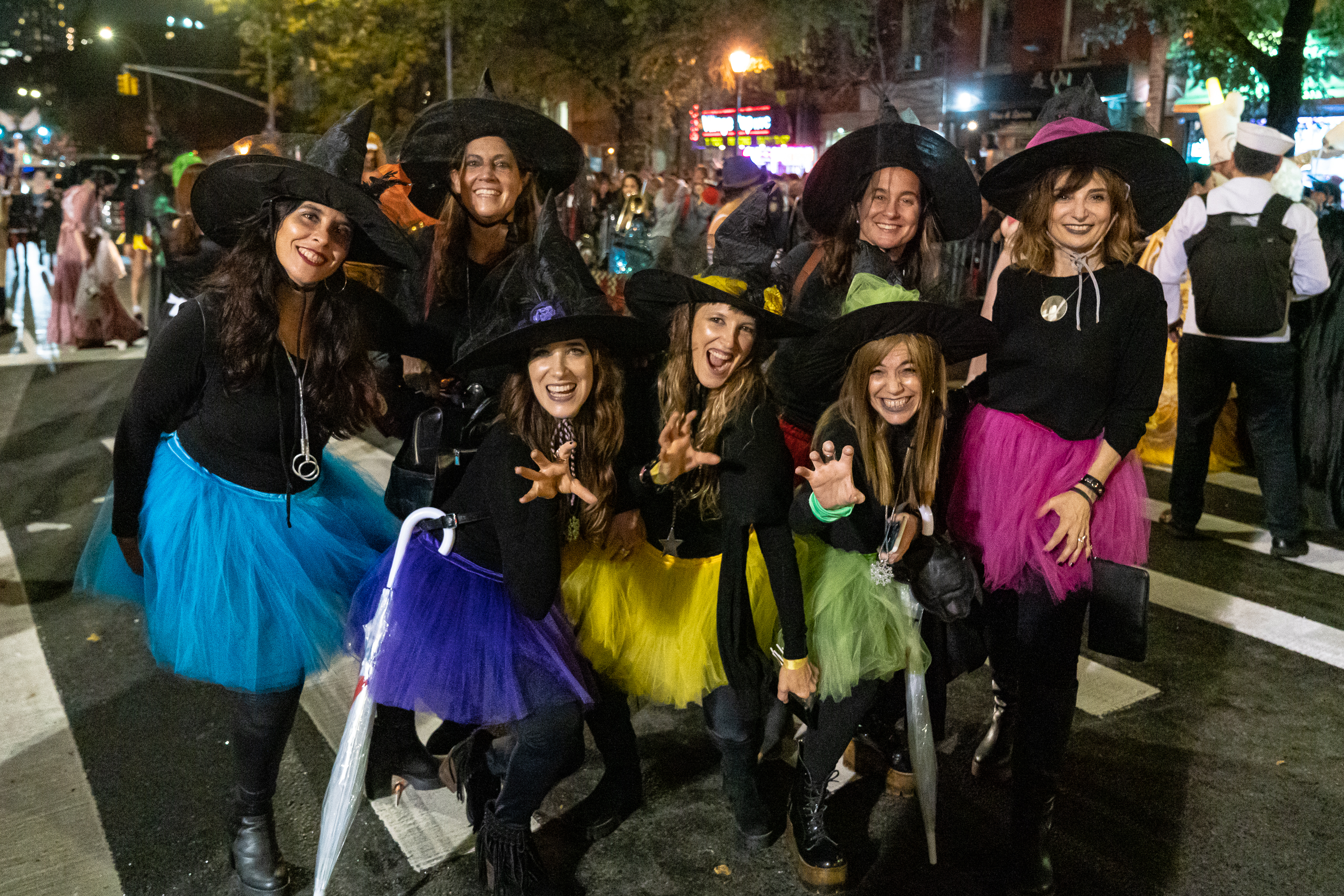
Parade participants (2019)

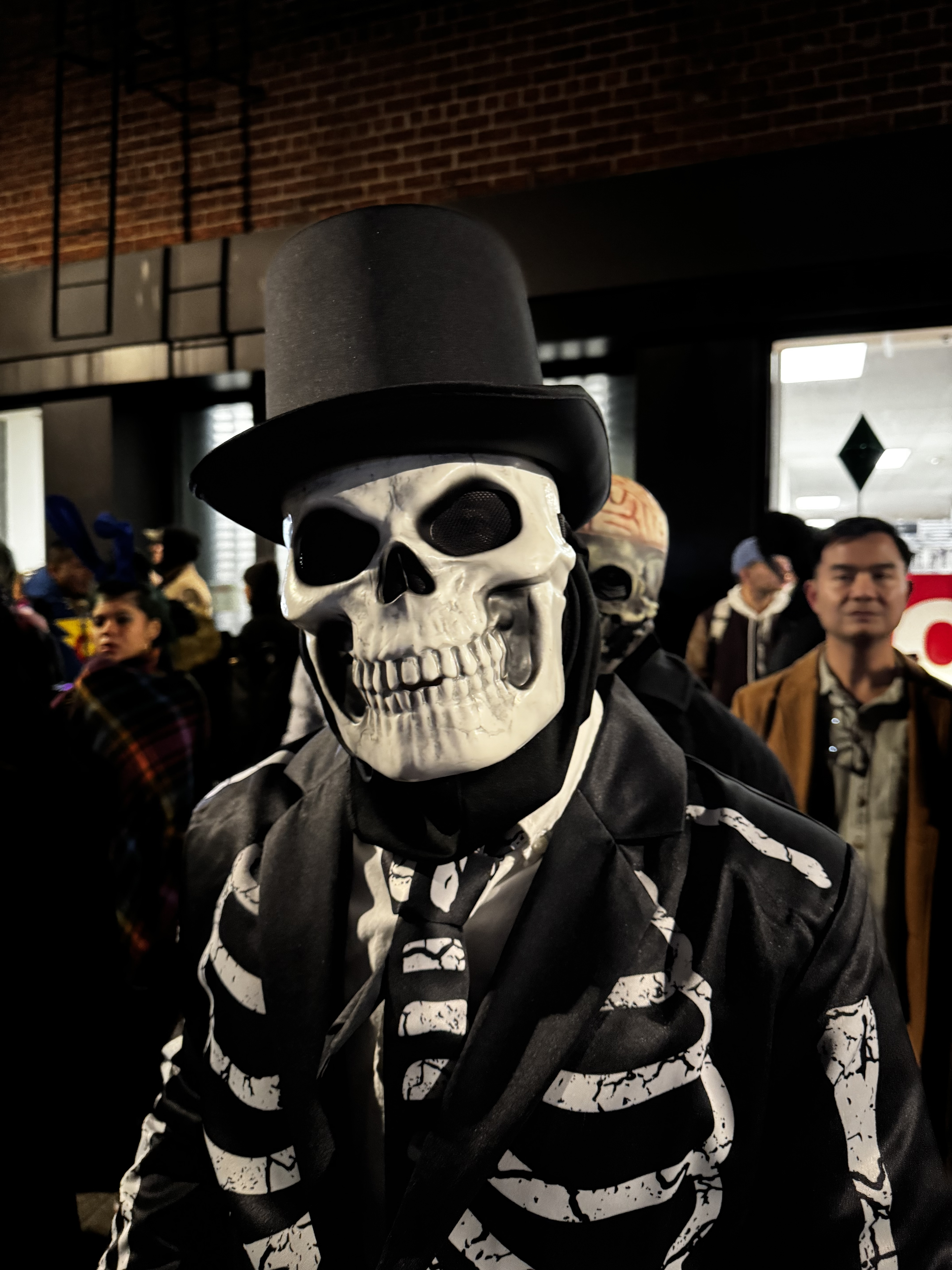
Skeleton Man (2025)

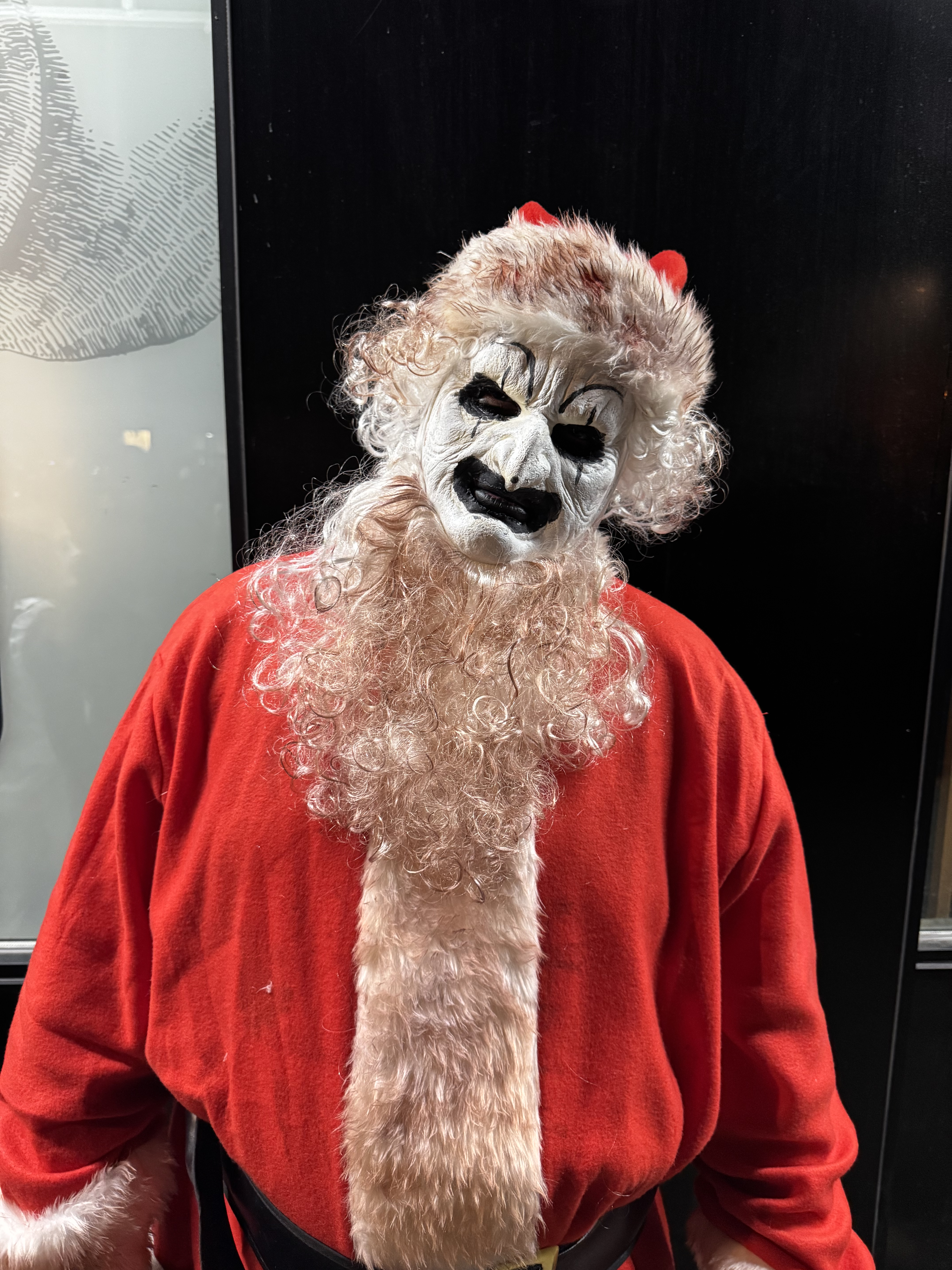
Horror Santa (2025)

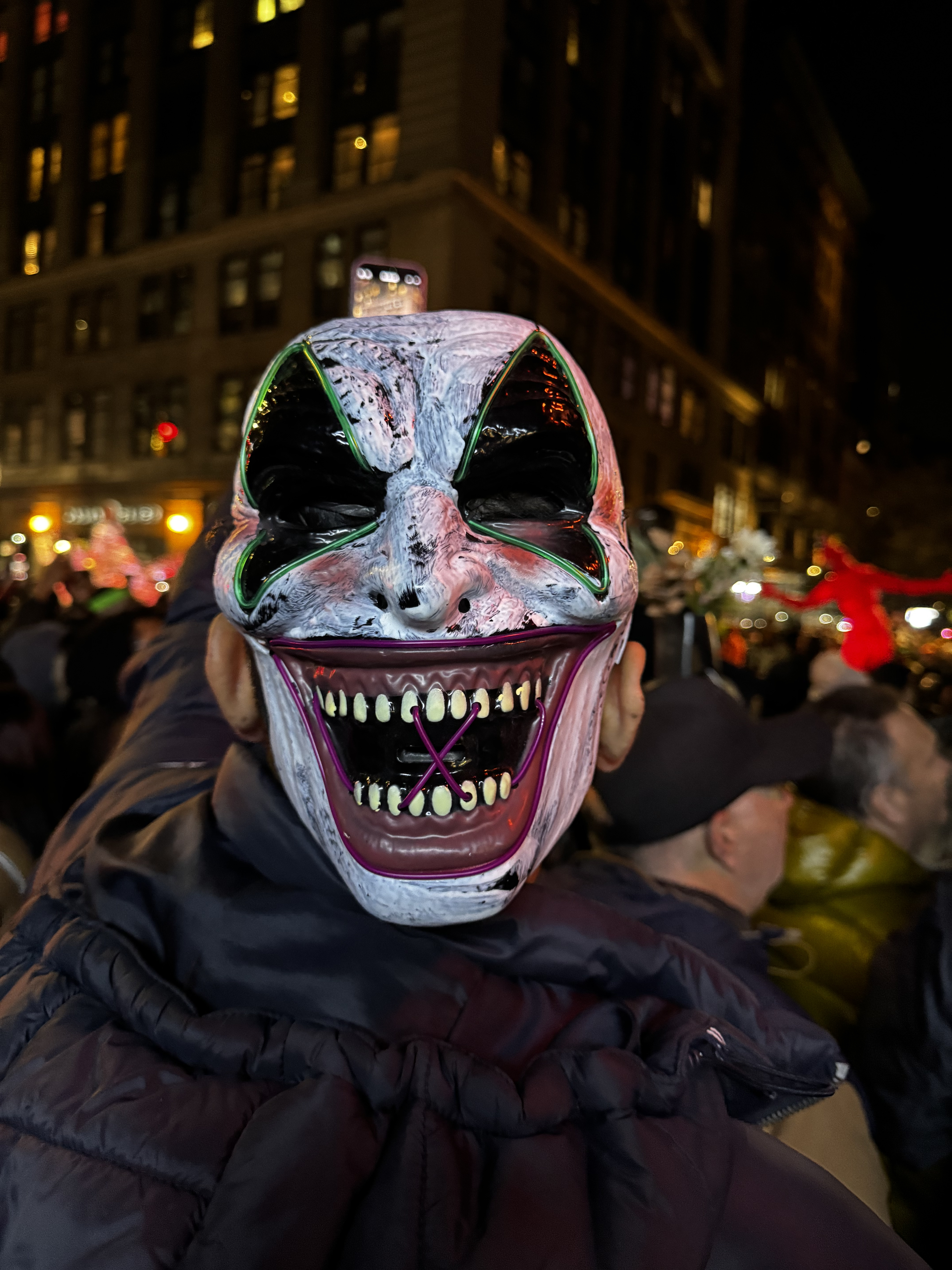
Deadly Clown (2025)

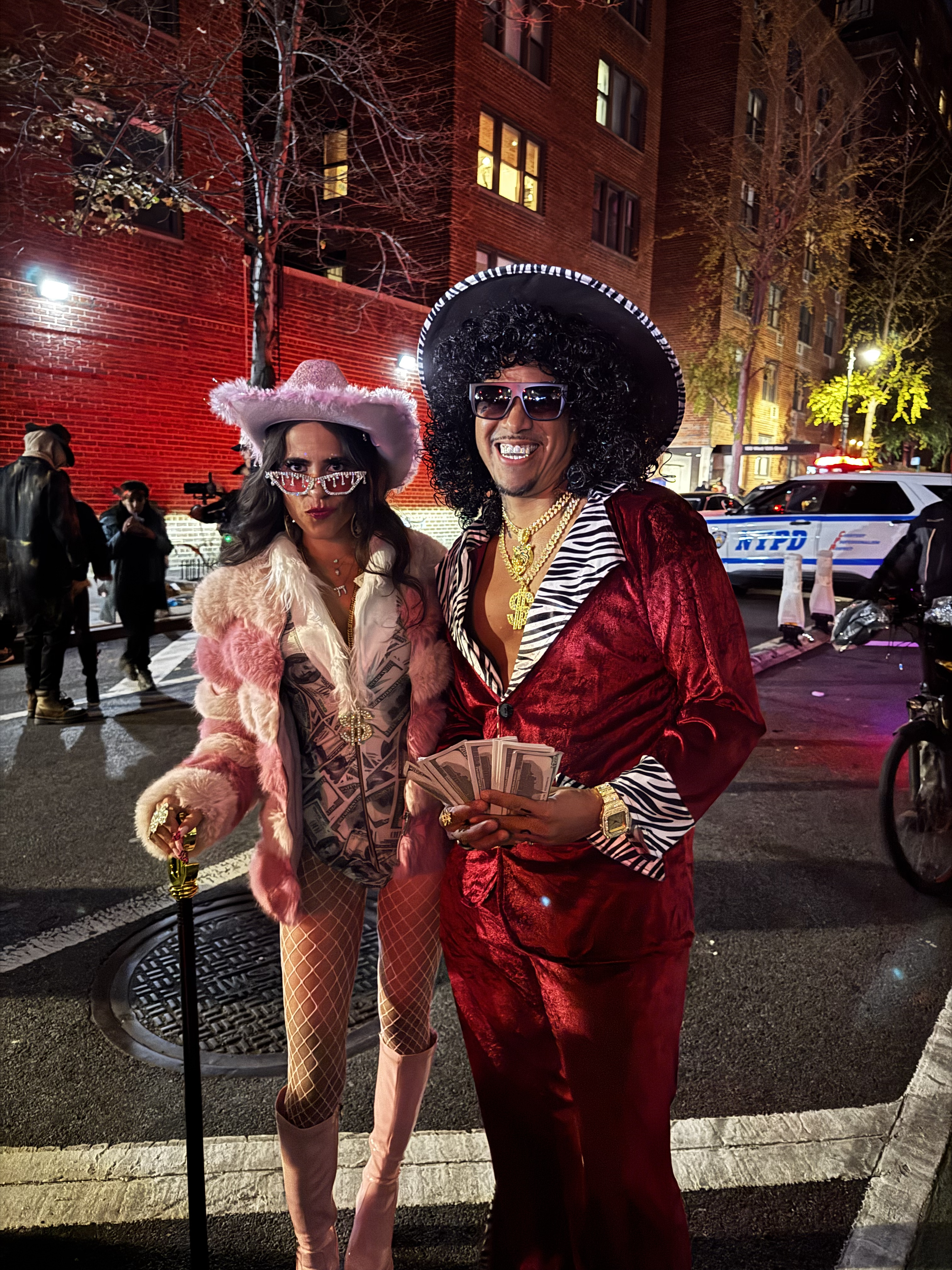
Mack and Date (2025)

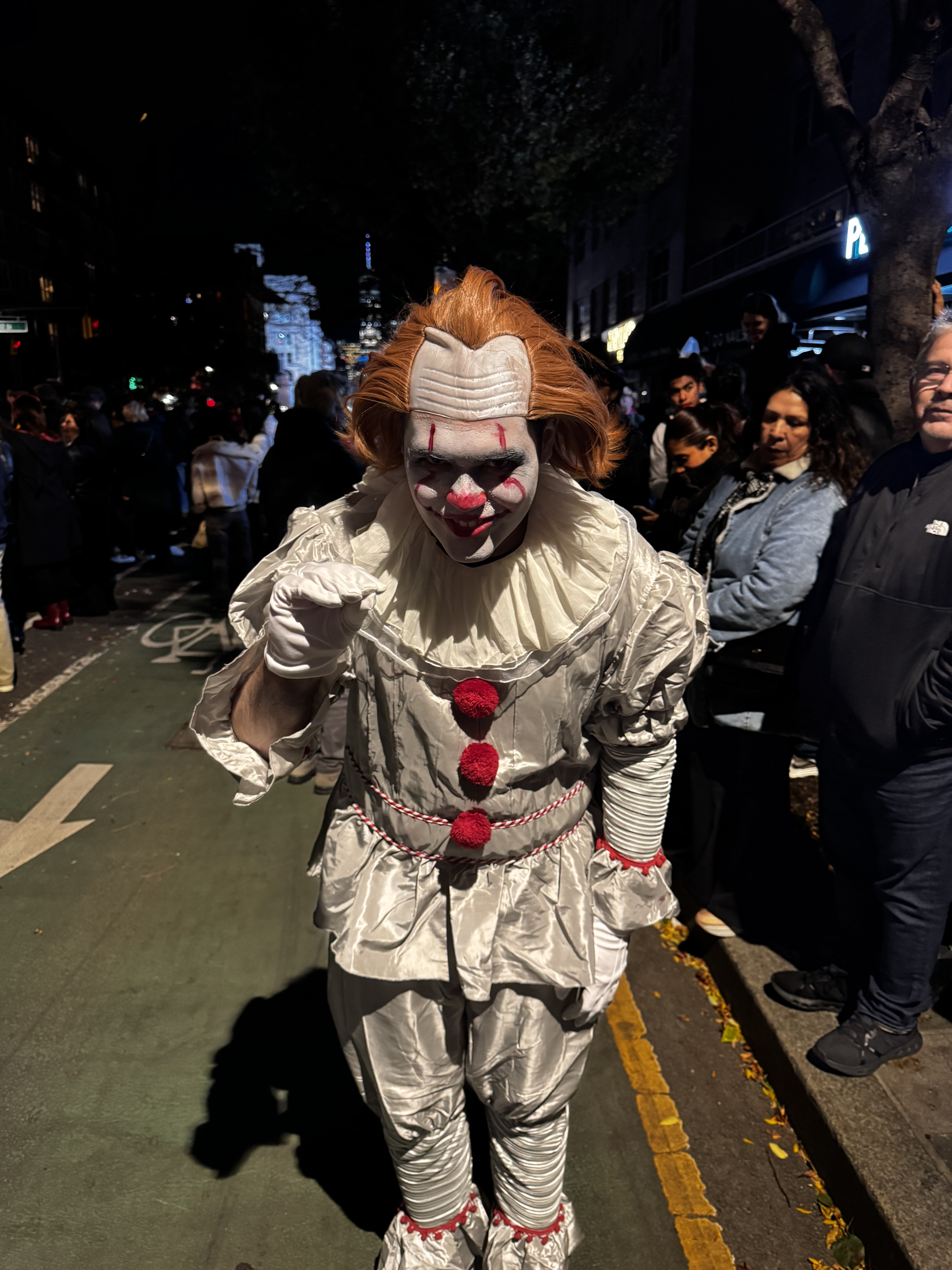
Pennywise (2025)
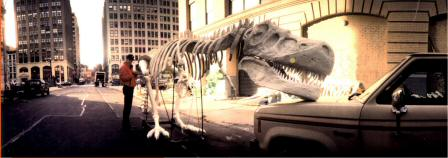
Finishing touches are made to a giant dinosaur puppet in the staging area on parade day

== Other sources ==
=== Videos ===
- Karl Gober

- 1999 Halloween Parade on YouTube
- 2000 Halloween Parade
  "Life Cycle of a Parade"
  Note: Each chapter is about one minute long
  Note: Twin Towers in background on their last Halloween

- (Chp 01: Hibernation) on YouTube
- (Chp 02: Sewing the seeds) on YouTube
- (Chp 03: Fever Pitch) on YouTube
- (Chp 05: First Run) on YouTube
- (Chp 06: Incarnation) on YouTube

- (Chp 07: First Flight) on YouTube
- (Chp 08: Tower of Basil) on YouTube
- (Chp 10: Offering) on YouTube
- (Chp 11: Parade) on YouTube

- 2004 Halloween Parade on YouTube
- 2006 Halloween Parade on YouTube

- Processional Arts Workshop — Theme Performances

- 2006: "'Jack'" on YouTube
- 2007: "Wings of Desire" on YouTube
- 2008: "Ghost" Superior on YouTube
- 2009: "Terra Incognita" on YouTube
- 2010: "Memento Mori" on YouTube

- 2010 Halloween on YouTube Street photo montage, Kenneth Akama

=== Photographs ===
- "Village Halloween Parade". NY Daily News.
- "Photos: 39th Annual Village Halloween Parade". Time Out New York. November 2011.
- NYCfoto — 2014, 2013, 2011, 2010, 2009, 2008
- Skillings, Pamela. "Halloween Dog Parade in Tompkins Square Park". About.com. Archived from the original on February 27, 2007.
