= Jeanne Fleming =

American festival organizer

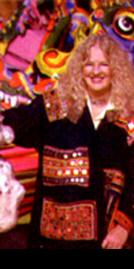
Jeanne Fleming

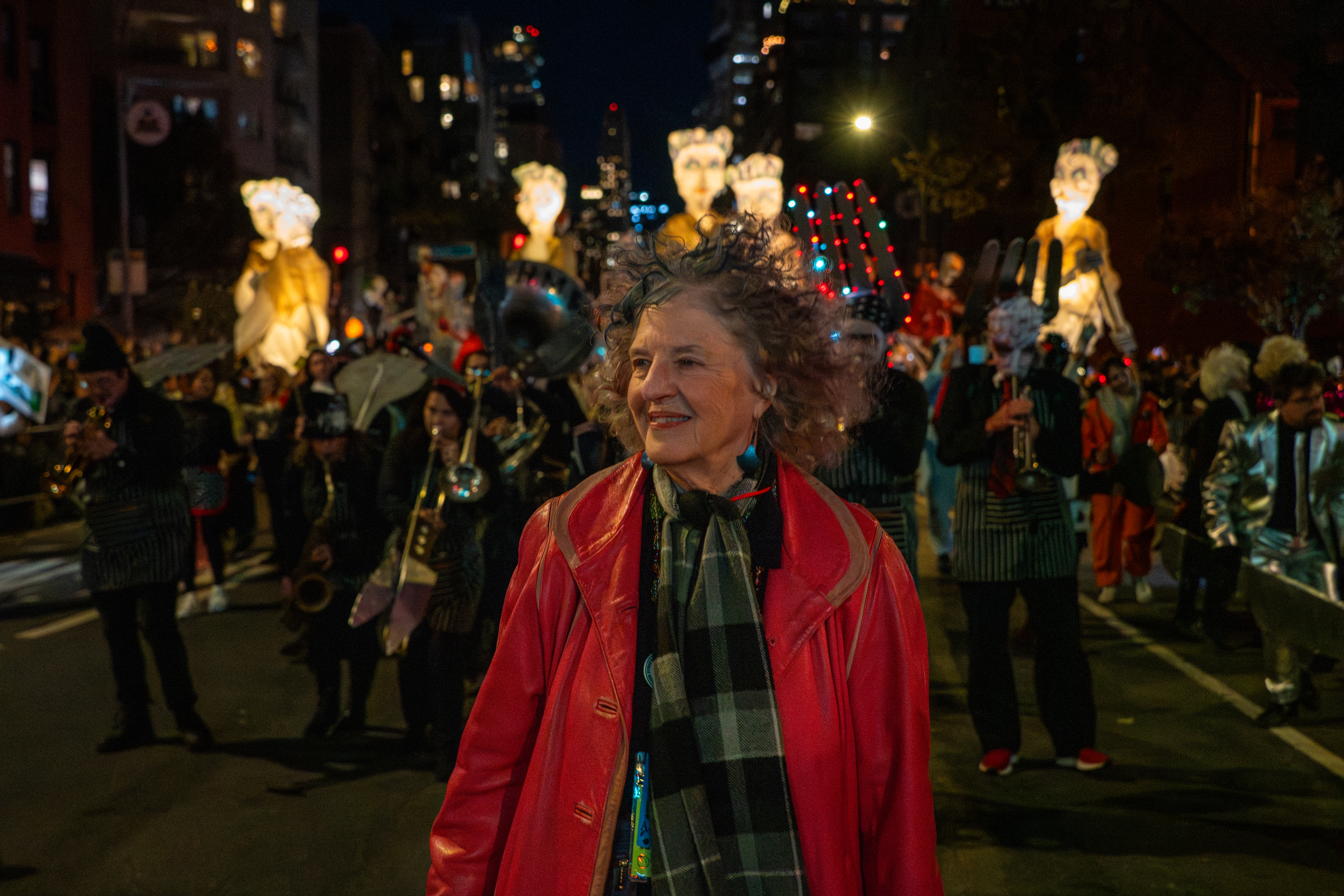
Jeanne Fleming at the 2025 NYC Halloween Parade

Jeanne Fleming is an American festival organizer from New York City. She organized the Harbor Festival Fair in 1986, the Official Land Celebration for the Centennial of the Statue of Liberty, and is currently director of New York's Village Halloween Parade.

== Sources ==
- New York's Village Halloween Parade Official Site
- Faculty page at Omega Institute
- Sinterklaas Rhinebeck Official Site
- Huffington Post Article on Sinterklaas
