= PEN World Voices =

Literary festival

The PEN World Voices Festival of International Literature is an annual week-long literary festival held in New York City and Los Angeles. The festival was founded by Salman Rushdie, Esther Allen, and Michael Roberts and was launched in 2005. The festival includes events, readings, conversations, and debates that showcase international literature and new writers. The festival is produced by PEN America, a nonprofit organization that works to advance literature, promote free expression, and foster international literary fellowship.

== World Voices 2005 ==
The inaugural event was held in New York City from April 18 to April 25, 2005. Participating authors came from 45 countries and included: Chimamanda Ngozi Adichie, Jonathan Ames, Paul Auster, Breyten Breytenbach, Nuruddin Farah, Gish Jen, Ryszard Kapuściński, Khaled Mattawa, Azar Nafisi, Elif Shafak, Wole Soyinka, Ali Bader and Ngũgĩ wa Thiong'o.

=== Selected 2005 Programs ===
- Conversation: Chico Buarque and Paul Auster
- Confronting the Worst: Writing and Catastrophe
- Don Quixote at 400: A Tribute
- Crossing Borders: Universal Themes in Children's Literature
- Literature and Power
- International Noir
- The Power of the Pen: Does Writing Change Anything?
- Writers and Iraq
- Africa and the World: The Writer’s Role
- Conversation: Hanan al-Shaykh and Salman Rushdie
- A Believer Magazine Nighttime Event
- The Post-National Writer
- The Way We Love Now
- Voices from the New Europe
- Czesław Miłosz and the Conscience of Literature

PEN America offers audio downloads and photos from select events on their website. Issue 7 of the PEN America literary journal also published selections from the 2005 programs.

== World Voices 2006 ==
The second World Voices Festival was held in New York City from April 26 to April 30, 2006. The Festival theme was Faith & Reason. The Festival featured 137 writers from 41 countries in 57 programs. International participants included: Martin Amis, Margaret Atwood, Gioconda Belli, Hans Magnus Enzensberger, David Grossman, Ayaan Hirsi Ali, Etgar Keret, Elias Khoury, Henning Mankell, Adam Michnik, Orhan Pamuk, Anne Provoost, Zadie Smith, Dương Thu Hương, Colm Tóibín, Ko Un, and Jeanette Winterson.

Immediately following the 2006 festival, Bill Moyers hosted a television series on PBS entitled "Faith & Reason," which featured participants from the festival.

=== Selected 2006 Programs ===
- Tell That Story Again: Writing Myth Now
- Honor Killings: When Families Commit Murder to Save Face
- Faith and Politics in America and Elsewhere
- Faith & Reason: Writers Speak
- Exiles in America
- Translation and Globalization
- The Limits of Tolerance? Multiculturalism Now
- Just the Facts: Truth & the Internet
- 51%: Women Write the World
- Revolution: A User’s Manual
- Idols and Insults: Writing, Religion, and Freedom of Expression
- HOWL for 50 Years
- Conversation: Ayaan Hirsi Ali & Philip Gourevitch
- Suitable for Children
- Conversation: Amartya Sen & Salman Rushdie

PEN America offers audio downloads and photos from select events on its website.

== World Voices 2007-2011 ==
In late 2006, Caro Llewellyn was recruited from Australia to be the festival director and organized the third through seventh Festivals with founder Salman Rushdie. This period saw great growth in the Festival's attendance and reach with guests including Nobel prize-winners such as Nadine Gordimer, Orhan Pamuk, Toni Morrison, and Mario Vargas Llosa, who appeared on stage with Umberto Eco and Salman Rushdie for an event at the 92Y called The Three Musketeers. During this period, the popular Translation Slam was introduced. The PEN Cabaret increased its cache with guests such as Patti Smith, Saul Williams, Bill T Jones, Natalie Merchant, and Sam Shepard. The Festival also extended its reach during this time with satellite events in Chicago, Portland, Albany, Pittsburgh, Miami, L.A., and other cities. An extensive program of year-round events was introduced including the first public appearance of scholar Tariq Ramadan since the State Department's ban on his exclusion from the United States. Ramadan's appearance took place at a sold-out event on April 8, 2010, at the Great Hall of Cooper Union in New York City, and was organized in collaboration with the ACLU.

== PEN World Voices 2012 ==
Organized by festival director Laszlo Jakab Orsos and founder Salman Rushdie, PEN World Voice Festival 2012 took place throughout New York City from April 30 to May 6 and featured Margaret Atwood, Jennifer Egan, Tony Kushner, Herta Müller, Paul Auster, Giannina Braschi, Martin Amis, Michael Cunningham, E.L. Doctorow, and Colson Whitehead. Highlights included a performance at the Metropolitan Museum of Art that paired the Kronos Quartet with writers Tony Kushner, Marjane Satrapi and Rula Jebreal to explore the boundaries between music and literature. Festival-goers participated in a literary safari, trolling through the halls of Westbeth, a West Village artists community, where they experienced readings by a range of authors, including Elias Khoury, Giannina Braschi and Peter Schneider. A Processional Arts Workshop opened the festival with a procession of giant bibliomorphic puppets, illuminated objects, and projections on the High Line at sundown.

== PEN World Voices 2017 ==
Organized by festival curatorial chair Rob Spillman, the PEN World Voices Festival 2017 focused on vital issues of the political period, with a special focus on the restive relationship between gender and power. Taking place in New York City May 1–7, 2017, the weeklong festival used the lens of literature and the arts to confront new challenges to free expression and human rights—issues that have been core to PEN America’s mission since its founding. During a historic moment of both unprecedented attacks on core freedoms and the emergence of new forms of resistance, the festival offered a platform for a global community of writers, artists, and thinkers to connect with a concerned public to fight back against bigotry, hatred, and isolationism. The event featured Samantha Bee, Chimamanda Ngozi Adichie, Carrie Brownstein, Teju Cole, Masha Gessen, Cecile Richards, Patti Smith, Gabourey Sidibe, Andrew Solomon, Saeed Jones, and many more.

=== Selected 2017 Programs ===
- United Against Hate
- Exposure: Politics, Sex, and Power
- Portraying Gay Male Life Today
- Gender, Power, and Authoritarianism in the Dystopian Age
- Pen vs. Sword: Satire vs. the State
- Arthur Miller Lecture: Masha Gessen and Samantha Bee
- Forbidden: Too Punk/Too Queer
- Queer Representation and the Media
- Girl-Powered Fiction
- Corrosive Power
- The Female Flaneur: Reclaiming the City
- Power of the Arts: From Propaganda to Free Speech
- Gender, Power, and Faith
- Forbidden: Too Liberated
- Monkey Business: Japan/America Writers' Dialogue
- Literary Quest: Tenement Edition
- A Woman's Place: In Food, Power and Writing
- Water as Weapon
- Shattering Taboos to Change Culture
- Forbidden: Too Desirous
- Forbidden: Too Much in Love
- The Poetry of War

== PEN World Voices 2018 ==
In 2017, PEN America recruited Chip Rolley, the former artistic director of Sydney Writers Festival, to take the position of Senior Director of Literary Programs and Director of World Voices Festival. The 2018 Festival featured an unprecedented breadth of literary and cultural luminaries under the banner of “Resist and Reimagine.” The theme captured the political division and discord apparent in the US and around the world, as well as the hope, energy, and activism shown by people coming together in powerful new ways to resist the encroachments on rights, liberties, and values. More than 200 writers, poets, artists, and thinkers representing 50 nationalities gathered in New York City for over 90 conversations, readings, debates, and discussions celebrating the best of the year’s literature and covering many different kinds of resistances—the internal and the external, the political and the personal—in different cultures, identities, and communities. The festival featured new streams of programming: one, American Voices, focused on American writers addressing the complex and polarizing issues in the US; another, Next Generation Now, aimed to nurture young people as agents of change. Festival participants included celebrated figures such as Laurie Anderson, Paul Auster, Hillary Rodham Clinton, Jelani Cobb, Jennifer Egan, Dave Eggers, Roxane Gay, Xiaolu Guo, Siri Hustvedt, Ryszard Krynicki, Jhumpa Lahiri, Salman Rushdie, Dag Solstad, Ngũgĩ wa Thiong’o, Colm Tóibín, Colson Whitehead, and many others. The concluding lecture was delivered by Hillary Rodham Clinton, who then engaged in conversation with Chimamanda Ngozi Adichie.

=== Selected 2018 Programs ===
- Resist and Reimagine: Opening Night
- Dave Eggers and Mokhtar Alkanshali: Good to the Last Drop
- No Country for Young Muslim Women
- Playing with Fire
- Us Too
- Cry, the Beloved Country
- Where Do We Go from Here?
- Borders of our Imagination
- Laurie Anderson and Chelsea Manning on Art, Technology, and Activism
- An Evening with Roxane Gay
- Unlived Lives
- Kexaptun: Poetry in New York’s Newest and Oldest Languages
- The Trick of Translation
- Reflections on Violence
- Handmaid in America
- Liminal States
- After the Storm: Puerto Rico, Poetry and Resistance
- Still, They Persisted
- New York Stories
- Life During Wartime
- It Can’t Happen Here
- America Real and Imagined
- The Arthur Miller Freedom to Write Lecture: Hillary Rodham Clinton with Chimamanda Ngozi Adichie
- The M Word: Hasan Minhaj and Wajahat Ali

== Cancellation of the 2024 festival ==
PEN America has canceled its World Voices festival after twenty-eight of the 61 nominated authors withdrew their books from consideration in the annual PEN America Awards ceremony as they condemned America's Pen for failing to strongly condemn the genocide in Palestine. The cancellation comes days after the organization canceled the 2024 annual awards festival. The festival was supposed to be held on May 8 in New York City and Los Angeles.
