= Hebden Bridge Handmade Parade =

Community-made parade in Hebden Bridge, England

The Hebden Bridge Handmade Parade is a community-made parade in Hebden Bridge, West Yorkshire, England. Produced by local arts organisations Handmade Parade CIC, the parade celebrates the creativity, variety and the uniqueness of Hebden Bridge and its surrounding areas. The parade takes place in June each year.

== Origin ==
The Hebden Bridge Handmade Parade was first proposed in 2007 by puppet and mask artist Andrew Kim who had worked as a lead in several community parades and festivals in the USA. The 2008 and 2009 Handmade Parades were co-produced by HEADS and Thingumajig Theatre. A new not-for-profit community interest company was set up in 2010 to organise the parade and the making and performance workshops beforehand.

== Workshops ==
The art for the parade is created largely in open public workshops in the weeks leading up to the parade. These workshops, led by a team of professional parade artists and volunteers, provide ideas, skills and materials for children and adults to make their own parade costumes, banners, puppets and carryable parade art. This workshop structure is styled after In the Heart of the Beast Puppet and Mask Theatre's MayDay Parade. To keep this parade a community-based, non-commercial handmade parade, the Hebden Bridge Handmade Parade has two rules: no written words or logos and no motorised vehicles. These rules are based on the rules for the Fremont Solstice Parade.

== Lantern Events ==
In 2012, as a response to the terrible floods in the Calder Valley, to help bring the community together and strengthen local businesses, Handmade Parade teamed up with Totally Locally to create Valley of Lights, a 3-town nighttime extravaganza. Following on from such an enthusiastic response for a local lantern event, in 2013, Handmade Parade produced the Lamplighter Festival in Todmorden.

== Other events and future plans ==
In addition to the annual Hebden Bridge Parade, Handmade Parade has created bespoke parades and participatory events for Incredible Edible Todmorden, Skipton International Puppet Festival and the Rochdale Canal Festival. Their giant puppets and parade art have also been part of many events such as the Huddersfield Festival of Lights and the opening of the Hepworth Wakefield Gallery.

Along with their Handmade Samba Band which plays in many local events and their new Festival Flag Hire business, they hope to become a sustainable year-round organisation dedicated to producing two excellent events a year – the Hebden Bridge Handmade Parade and the Todmorden Lamplighter Festival – and be available to bring their parade magic to local events whenever possible.

== See also ==
- In the Heart of the Beast Puppet and Mask Theatre
- Bread & Puppet
- Fremont Solstice Parade
- Islewilde
- Procession of the Species
- New York's Village Halloween Parade
