= Horse and Bamboo Theatre =

British mask, actor and puppet company

- The Woodcarver 1982
- Formation: 1978
- Type: Touring, visual, community
- Purpose: Mask, puppetry, music
- Artistic director: Bob Frith 1978-2018 Alison Duddle 2005-2017 Esther Ferry-Kennington 2018-2026 (CEO) Jenn Camilleri 2026-present
- Website: horseandbamboo.com

Horse and Bamboo Theatre, or Horse + Bamboo Theatre, is a British theatre company founded in 1978 by Bob Frith. The company was known for using distinctive masks and visual, puppet, physical and music-based forms rather than text. Until 2018, it worked internationally as well as from its base, then known as The Boo, in Waterfoot, Rossendale, Lancashire, UK. Since 2012, its work has been increasingly emphasised in serving its local community, with the last touring shows in 2019. In 2022, the venue was ‘de-branded’ to ‘Horse + Bamboo’.

== Origins ==
'Boma' from 'Harvest of Ghosts' 1998 by Sam Ukala/Bob Frith

Frith taught in the early 1970s at Manchester School of Art (later Manchester Metropolitan University). Unhappy with the prevailing abstraction of the period, he experimented with extending purely visual forms to include live performance and music, influenced by Allan Kaprow, Red Grooms and Claes Oldenburg, and working with groups of his students. At the Bede Gallery, Jarrow, he worked on a large-scale project with his friend Dave Pearson, a filmmaker and artist, including the musician Alan Price, and engineers from the local shipbuilding industry.

In the mid-70s, he met Welfare State and worked with that company for two years. He formed Horse + Bamboo Theatre in 1978, with a group of ex-students, musicians, and members of Matrogoth Theatre from Leiden, Netherlands.

After 2000, Frith worked closely with Alison Duddle, originally of In the Heart of the Beast Puppet and Mask Theatre from Minneapolis, on most of the company's productions. In late 2016, Duddle left the company, and Frith retired in March 2018, although continuing to work with Apna Rossendale (see Different Moons, below).

== Name ==
The name derives from using horses to pull a caravan of vehicles when touring, a central feature of the company's work from 1979 to 1999. This grew from their commitment to taking their work to rural communities and using the horses and horse-drawn wagons to attract an audience. Due to its lightness and strength, bamboo was the main structural timber used in the early horse-drawn touring sets and used to make puppets and music instruments.

Since 2000, Horse + Bamboo has toured more conventionally, but its roots in rural touring were maintained through tours with small, flexible shows that lend themselves to community venues. Since 2018, the company has focused on creative work in and with the community.

The company is based in a Waterfoot, Rossendale, Lancashire building, originally the Liberal Club. The venue was originally called 'The Boo'. In 2020, the venue reverted to being known as Horse + Bamboo.

== Productions ==
Horse + Bamboo Theatre created its material, occasionally collaborating with other artists and writers, with most of its productions made by the core team of artists. Its hallmark was in creating sustained theatrical narratives without the use of dialogue, as well as the use of full-head masks and puppetry. Film, music and dance are often integrated within the company's productions. The nature of the company's work changed radically after 2018 with the departure of the original artistic directors.

"The work that they create is uncompromising in terms of artistry and subject matter. The artistic directors Bob Frith and Alison Duddle create work to which they bring the passion of great artists - emotionally powerful, beautiful to look at, laced with humour and pathos that reaches out to audiences, and one more thing that is quite difficult to describe. It is rough, and there is an absence of slick polish and finish in the design. A deliberate roughing of the edges contrasts with the performance's beautiful precision and soundscoring. Watching and being involved in a Horse and Bamboo performance, we as the audience aren't allowed to forget that this event is being hewed from the wood, metal, paper, cloth, paint and bodies of flesh and blood in front of our eyes. It brings the moment into focus for us.
"Horse and Bamboo isn't a puppetry company but uses puppets. From what I've seen, puppets are mixed in for either stylistic or semiotic reasons, or both simultaneously."

=== Touring ===
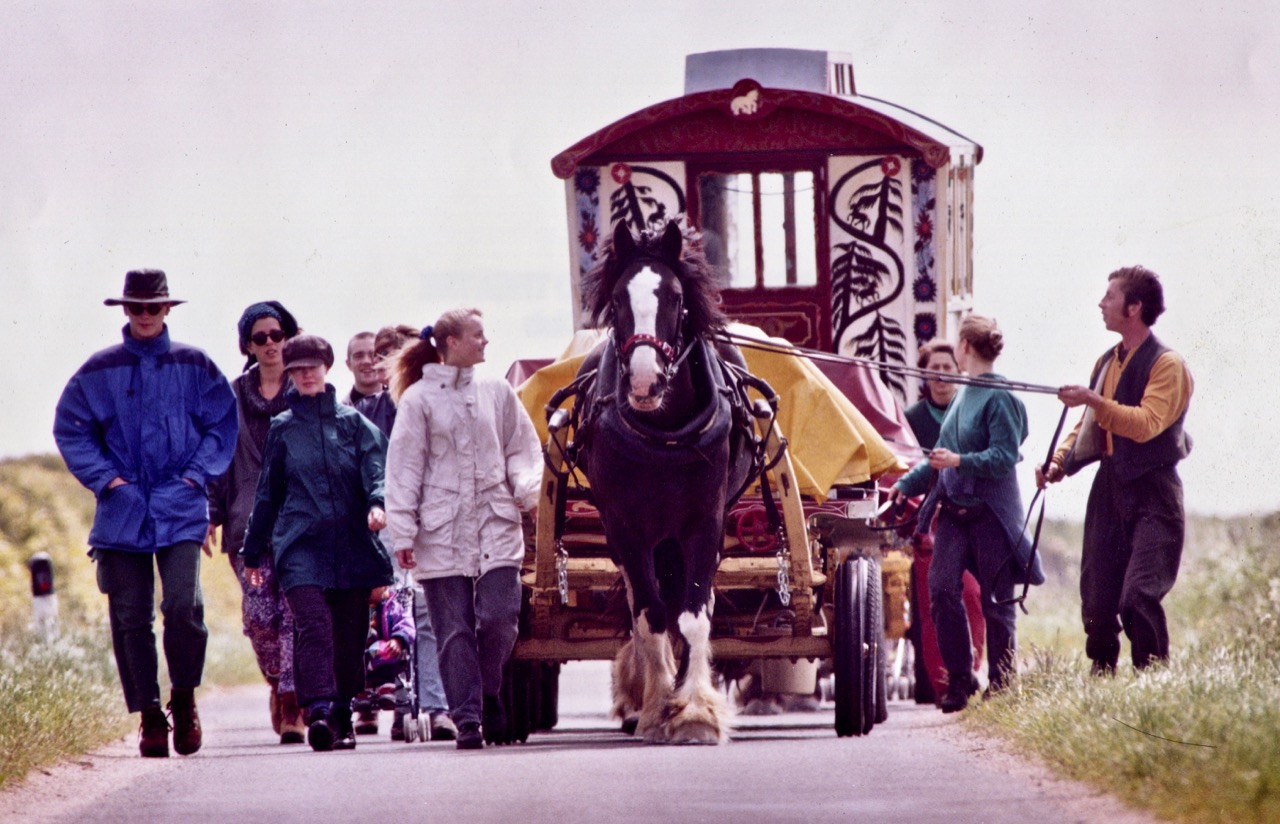
Horse + Bamboo Theatre on tour in north-east Scotland.

For its first two decades, Horse + Bamboo toured using horse-drawn transport. These productions started as outdoor shows and moved into a marquee after four years. Eventually, the company began to create shows that played in village halls and other community centres. The performers walked about 400 miles each season, living in tents and cooking on open fires. Horse-drawn touring occurred in England, Scotland, Ireland, Hungary and Slovakia. Now, the company tours its productions throughout the UK and has toured in Spain, the Netherlands, Germany, and Belgium. For a while, the company also used the pPod, a portable structure designed by Magma Architecture which can be set up in 90 minutes and seats up to 35 people. A co-production (with In the Heart of the Beast Puppet and Mask Theatre) of Company of Angels toured the United States between 2003 and 2006.

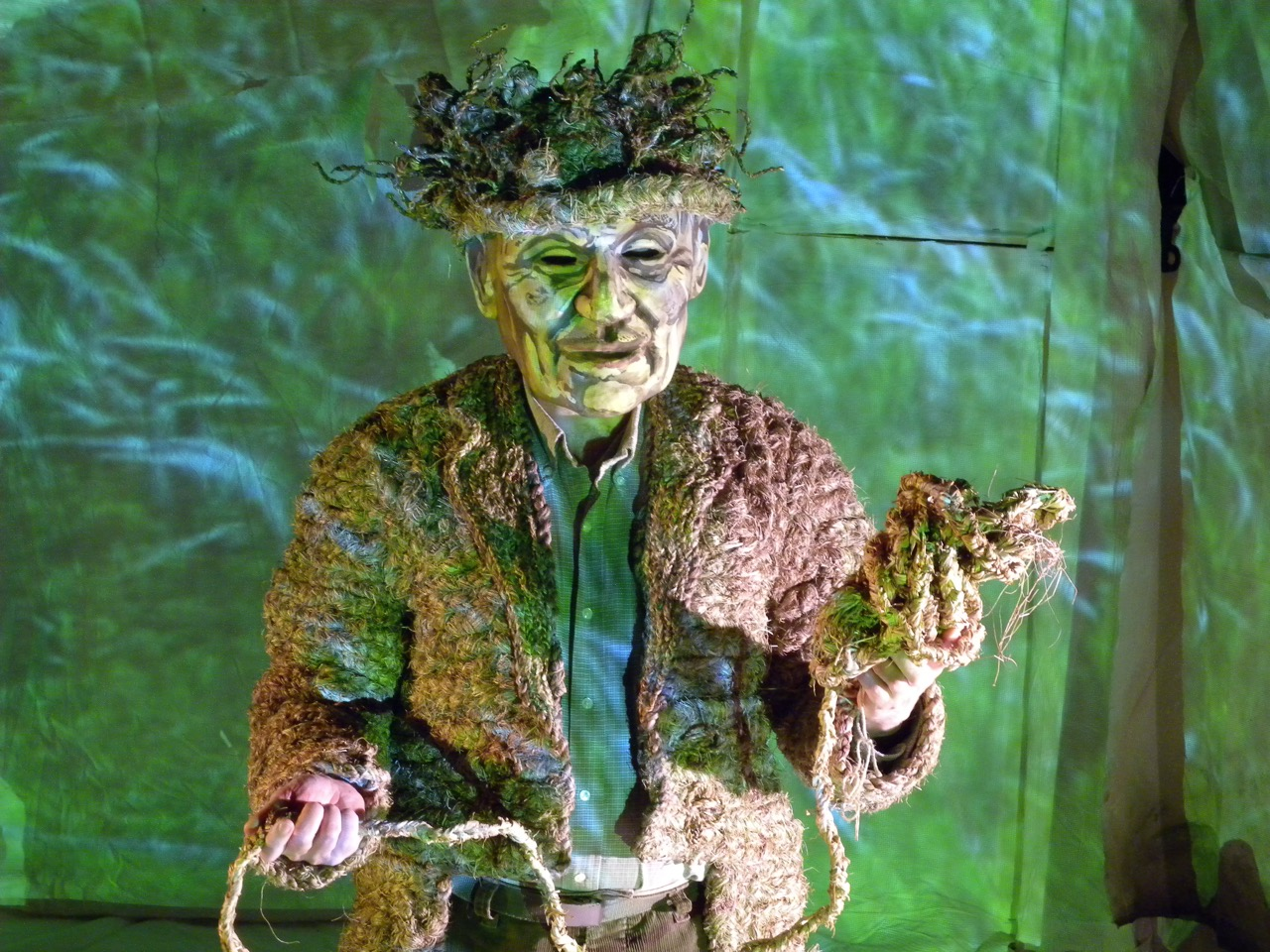
Shot from production. Mask by Bob Frith; performer Mark Whitaker.

Significant Horse + Bamboo Theatre touring productions include The Woodcarver Story(1982); Dance of White Darkness (1994), about Maya Deren in Haiti; Harvest of Ghosts (1999) created with Sam Ukala, the Nigerian playwright; as well as Company of Angels (2002) about the life of Charlotte Salomon. The company toured an epic production, Veil, in 2008 that contrasts the lives of two young women, one an Iraqi, the other brought up in Europe, and is set across two generations.

In The Shadow of Trees was written and designed by Bob Frith for the Royal Exchange Theatre Studio in Manchester. Directed by associate director Alison Duddle, it won the Best New Play at the M.E.N. Awards in 2006 and subsequently toured, despite being created especially for the Royal Exchange. Duddle has since adapted and directed several other productions aimed at young audiences, including Red Riding Hood and The Nightingale.

In 2009, the company created Little Leap Forward, a production in collaboration with Barefoot Books, adapted by Alison Duddle from the book by Guo Yue and Clare Farrow, which opened at the Manchester Royal Exchange. Guo Yue created new music for the production that was integrated into the score by musical director Loz Kaye. They also devised Deep Time Cabaret, part of the 'Valley of Stone' project, inspired by the landscape of Rossendale, its geology and industry. The production was unusual for the company in hardly using masks and the complex use of projected images and video. In 2012, and again in 2013, the company toured Angus - Weaver of Grass about the Scottish Outsider Artist Angus MacPhee throughout the Hebrides and Highland Regions of Scotland (image to right).

From 2012 onwards, the touring programme diminished due to changes to arts funding. The emphasis for the company changed to working within the local East Lancashire community, and centred on its workshop, then called 'The Boo'. Some touring continued, notably Theatre Ballads, which combines live folk music with puppetry and video, and Suffrajitsu, directed by Esther Ferry-Kennington. The Moonwatcher in 2018 was a collaboration between Bob Frith and the poet Shamshad Khan, that grew out of work with the local South Asian heritage communities. It was the last production involving Bob Frith before he retired from the company.

=== Horse + Bamboo - Rossendale Venue ===
Horse + Bamboo is based in a building, originally known as The Boo, in Waterfoot, Rossendale. The building is used as a centre and venue for regular arts events and the development of visual and community theatre. In 2015, the building was renovated and improved, and now has a 90-seat theatre, a studio space, and better facilities for public events. The building is the base for a programme of projects working closely with the local community.

The building regularly hosts family theatre shows, bringing in touring companies. It hosts live music, film and comedy, and Early Years theatre.

Horse + Bamboo also hosts 'Waterfoot Wakes', an annual community festival. Waterfoot Wakes is a free summer festival that runs across Waterfoot, and includes the Waterfoot Parade which happens on the first Saturday of the festival.

.

=== Guided Imagery ===
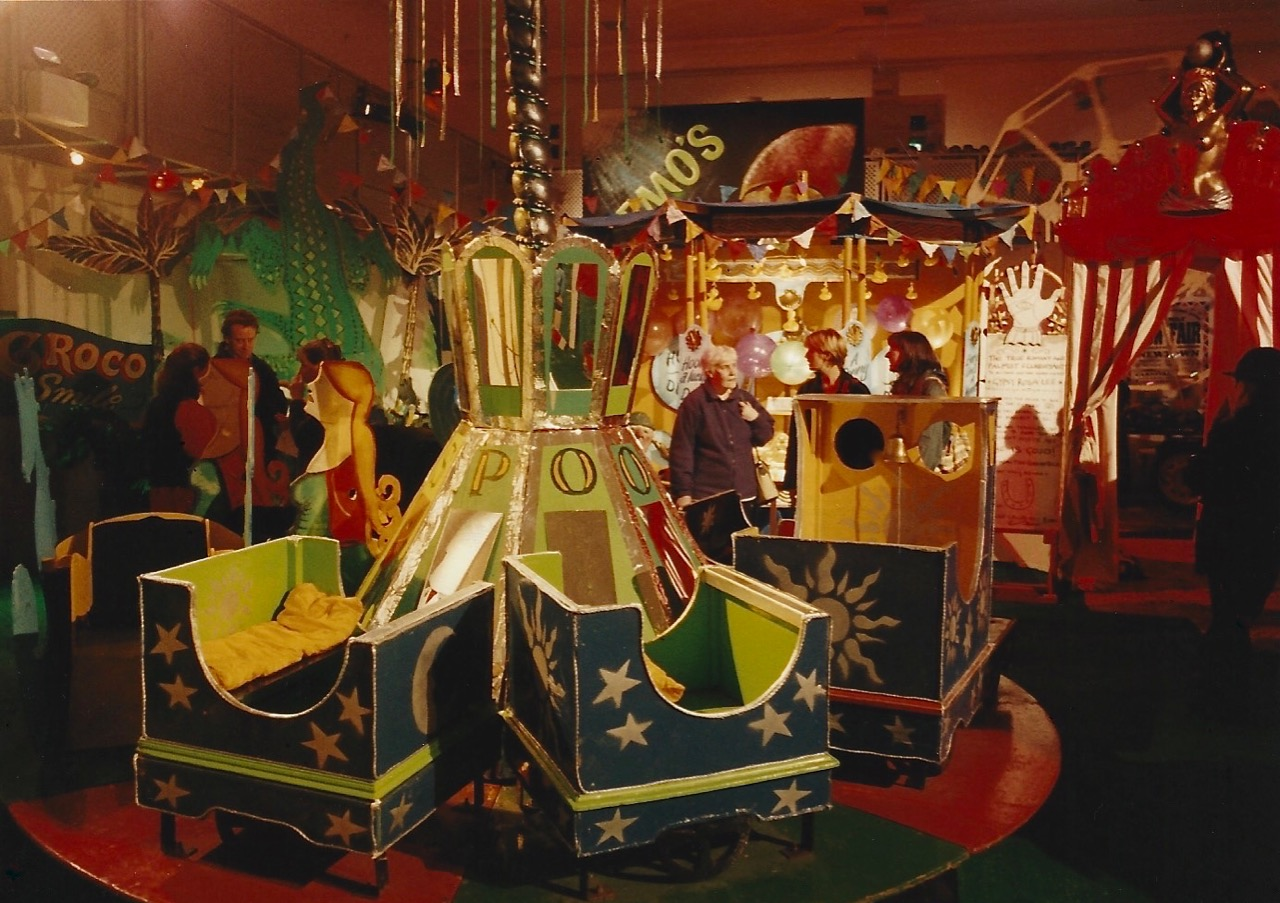
Immersive Fairground set for a Guided Imagery production

Horse + Bamboo has also influenced its work with people with special needs through its Guided Imagery programme. This programme, started in 1982, uses a large-scale built environment and performance space through which small and intimate groups journey and interact with a highly sensory environment. These 'performances' last several hours, notably blurring the gap between performer and audience. These productions were precursors to the immersive theatre developed by Punchdrunk and others. Since 2014, the company has utilised many of the techniques developed for this work on a new strand of theatre work for very young children, frequently pre-toddlers.

=== Different Moons ===
In 2013, Horse + Bamboo started a project with the South Asian community in Rossendale, particularly Haslingden. Funded by the Heritage Lottery Fund, Different Moons initiated a series of interviews with first-generation immigrants from Pakistan and Bangladesh. These were transcribed and the stories told were used as a basis for workshops with the second and third generation South Asian heritage community, particularly young people and women. The project has been led mainly by South Asia artists, particularly Shamshad Khan, the Manchester-based poet. In addition to creative writing the project has created exhibitions, installations, melas, and mushairas with workshops in mehndi, calligraphy and paper-cut arts. In 2015, the company helped open a small meeting place and gallery in Haslingden, called 'Apna' (meaning 'ours' or 'mine' in Urdu), that provides various opportunities for women mainly from Pakistani or Bangladeshi heritage. Apna became an independent organisation largely supporting South Asian heritage women, based in Haslingden and managed by Arry Nessa and others. This closed in 2020 during the Covid epidemic, although its influence continues with creative community work locally among South Asian, refugee and asylum seekers.

== See also ==
- Bread & Puppet Theater
- Thingumajig Theatre
