= Thingumajig Theatre =

Thingumajig Theatre is a puppet company who creates and performs innovative visual theatre, interactive giant puppets and outdoor performances. Founded in 2005 by Korean American puppeteer Andrew Kim and British actor/musician Kathy Kim, Thingumajig Theatre is based in Hebden Bridge and Todmorden, West Yorkshire, England.

== History ==
Thingumajig Theatre’s two directors, Andrew Kim and Kathy Kim, first worked together as mask performers in a play by Horse and Bamboo Theatre in 2002. Since then, they’ve worked together as makers, performers and directors for In the Heart of the Beast Puppet and Mask Theatre, Islewilde Festival, Oregon Country Fair, Vancouver’s Public Dreams Society and Taiwan’s Dream Community. In 2005, with their first full-length play, “The Vertigo of Sheep” which was awarded a UNIMA-USA Citation of Excellence, they formed into a permanent theatre company.

In 2006 they moved into the old Sunday school room in Wainsgate Chapel in Old Town, West Yorkshire, which served as their workshop for five years. Since 2011, they are now based in the Hebden Bridge Handmade Parade workshop.

In 2008, Thingumajig Theatre joined forces with HEADS, a Hebden Bridge participatory arts organisation, and produced the Hebden Bridge Handmade Parade, a vivid, non-commercial community-generated parade. This event is now produced by Handmade Parade CIC.

== Giant Puppets and Community Events ==
Thingumajig Theatre also creates and performs giant puppets for outdoor events and performances such as parades, pageants and festivals. They have also directed and led several community-generated events such as the Conwy Lantern Parade and Pageant, the Liverpool Halloween Lantern Carnival Finale and the Hebden Bridge Handmade Parade.

== See also ==
- In the Heart of the Beast Puppet and Mask Theatre
- Horse and Bamboo Theatre
- Bread & Puppet
