= Emmanuel Episcopal Church, Boston =

Emmanuel Church
- Emmanuel Church in the City of Boston
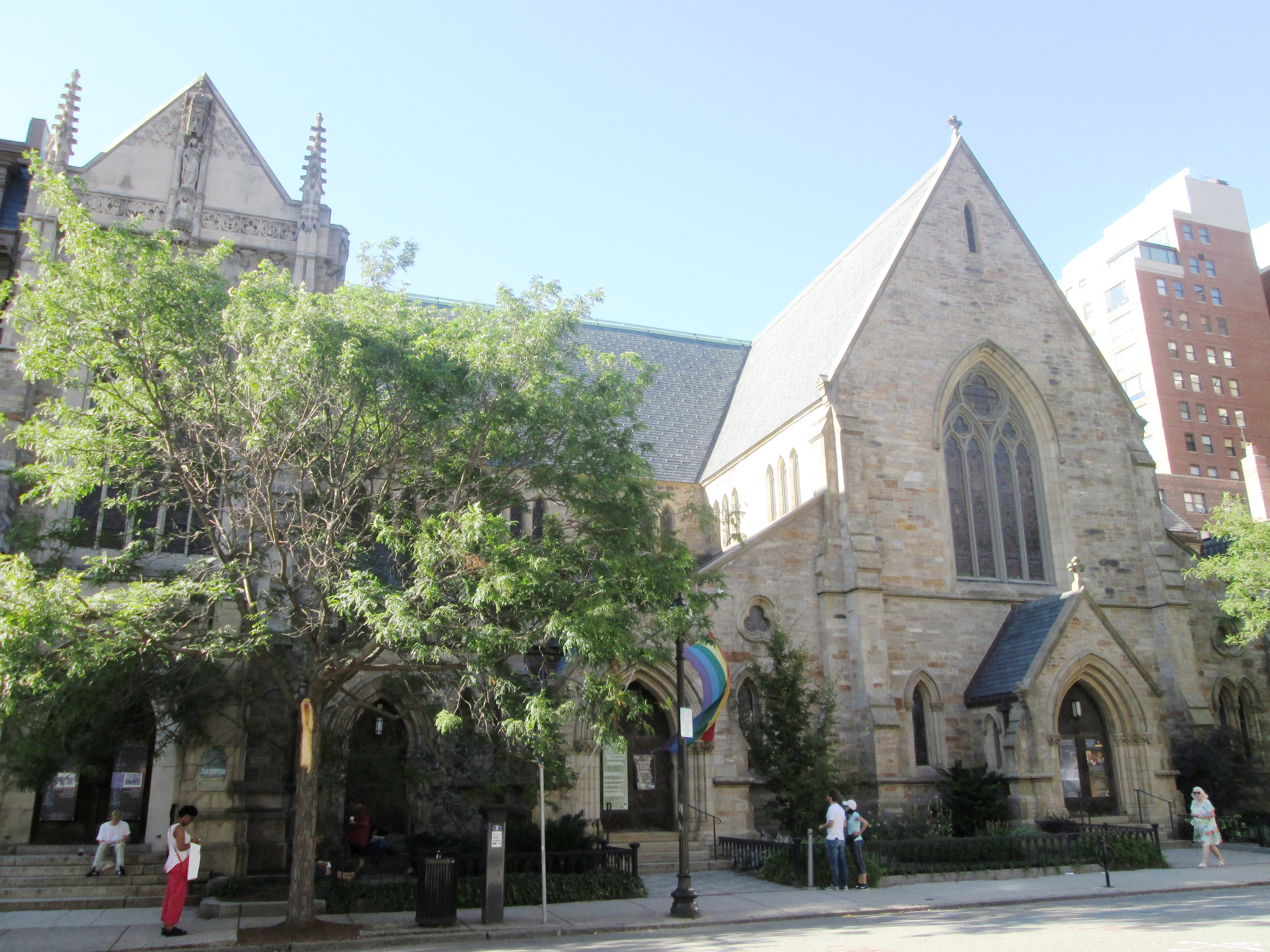
- Emmanuel Church
- Address: 15 Newbury Street; Back Bay, Boston, Massachusetts
- Country: United States
- Denomination: Episcopal
- Website: Website of the Church

History
- Status: Active
- Founded: June 17, 1861
- Consecrated: April 24, 1862

Architecture
- Functional status: Parish Church
- Architect(s): Alexander Rice Esty, Francis Richmond Allen
- Architectural type: Neo-Gothic

Administration
- Diocese: Massachusetts

Clergy
- Bishop: Alan M. Gates
- Rector: Pamela L. Werntz

Emmanuel Episcopal Church is a historic church at 15 Newbury Street in the Back Bay neighborhood of Boston, Massachusetts. It was founded in 1860 as part of the Episcopal Diocese of Massachusetts.

== History ==
Designed by architect Alexander Rice Esty and constructed in 1861, it was the first building completed on Newbury Street in Boston's newly filled Back Bay. In 1899, Frederic Crowninshield designed its sanctuary's centerpiece window, in which the allegorical figure Piety, from John Bunyan's The Pilgrim's Progress, points the way to Emmanuel's Land.

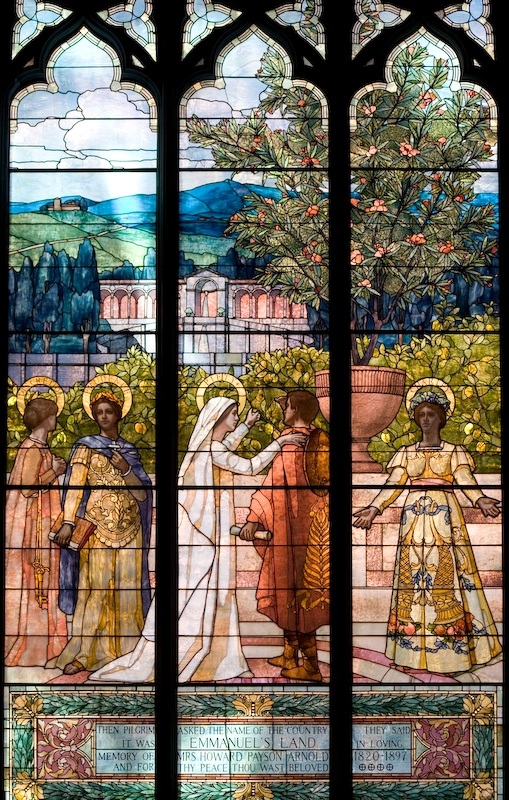
Emmanuel's Land Window depicts a scene from John Bunyan's Pilgrim's Progress

The Leslie Lindsey Memorial Chapel, consecrated in 1924, is considered one of the architectural gems of Boston. An all-encompassing product of and testimony to the artistry of Ninian Comper, the work comprises a decorative scheme for the chapel designed by the architectural firm of Allen & Collens. Comper designed its altar, altar screen, pulpit, lectern, dozens of statues, all its furnishings and appointments, and most notably the stained glass windows. The finest Gothic-revival style craftsmen were engaged for the project under the direction of Campbell & Aldrich of Boston. The chapel memorializes Leslie Lindsey and her husband of ten days Stewart Mason, who were married at Emmanuel Church and perished when the Lusitania was torpedoed in 1915. In 1966, the Back Bay historic district was established, protecting any building within its boundaries from exterior changes, including this building.

Its outreach program in the early twentieth century, known as the Emmanuel Movement, was influential in the development of self-help groups for mental health, particularly for alcoholism. The church is known for hosting Emmanuel Music, which performs Bach cantatas in their intended liturgical setting, coordinated with the lectionary.

It has a cooperative, interfaith partnership with the Jewish Central Reform Temple, with which it shares the building. The clergy from the two congregations regularly offer sermons for each other's congregations, and members are invited to attend the other congregation's services.

== Puppet Free Library ==
The church also houses the Puppet Free Library founded by Sara Peattie and the church's rector in the 1980s, Rev. Al Kershaw. The library is located in the basement of the church. It houses a collection of giant puppets that can be lent to users for parades and other events. It also houses Peattie's studio. The puppets are often used by schools and in parades, including Boston's First Night New Year's celebration. The puppets are generic characters (e.g., giant cats, flowers, dragons), as opposed to specific persons (e.g., Donald Trump) or characters (e.g., Pinocchio).

== Clergy ==
- The Rev. Dr. Frederic Dan Huntington, 1st rector, 1861–1869
- The Rev. Dr. Alexander Hamilton Vinton, 2nd rector, 1869–77
- The Rev. Dr. Leighton Parks, 3rd rector, 1878–1904
- The Rev. Dr. Elwood Worcester, 4th rector, 1904–1929
- The Rev. Dr. Benjamin Martin Washburn, 5th rector, 1929–1932
- The Rev. Dr. Phillips Endicott Osgood, 6th rector, 1932–1943
- The Rev. Robert Gifford Metters, 7th rector, 1946–1956
- The Rev. Harold Bend Sedgwick, 8th rector, 1957–1962
- The Rev. Alvin L. Kershaw, 9th rector, 1962–1989
- The Rev. Michael Kuhn, 10th rector, 1991–1993
- The Rev. Dr. William Blaine-Wallace, 11th rector, 1993–2005
- The Rev. Pamela L. Werntz, 12th rector, 2008–present

== Windows ==
Stained-glass windows by these artists can be seen in the church.

- Ninian Comper
- Charles Jay Connick
- Frederic Crowninshield
- Harry Eldredge Goodhue
- Heaton, Butler and Bayne
- Charles Eamer Kempe
- Louis Comfort Tiffany
- Samuel West
- Henry Wynd Young
