= Sam Ukala =

Nigerian playwright (1948–2021)

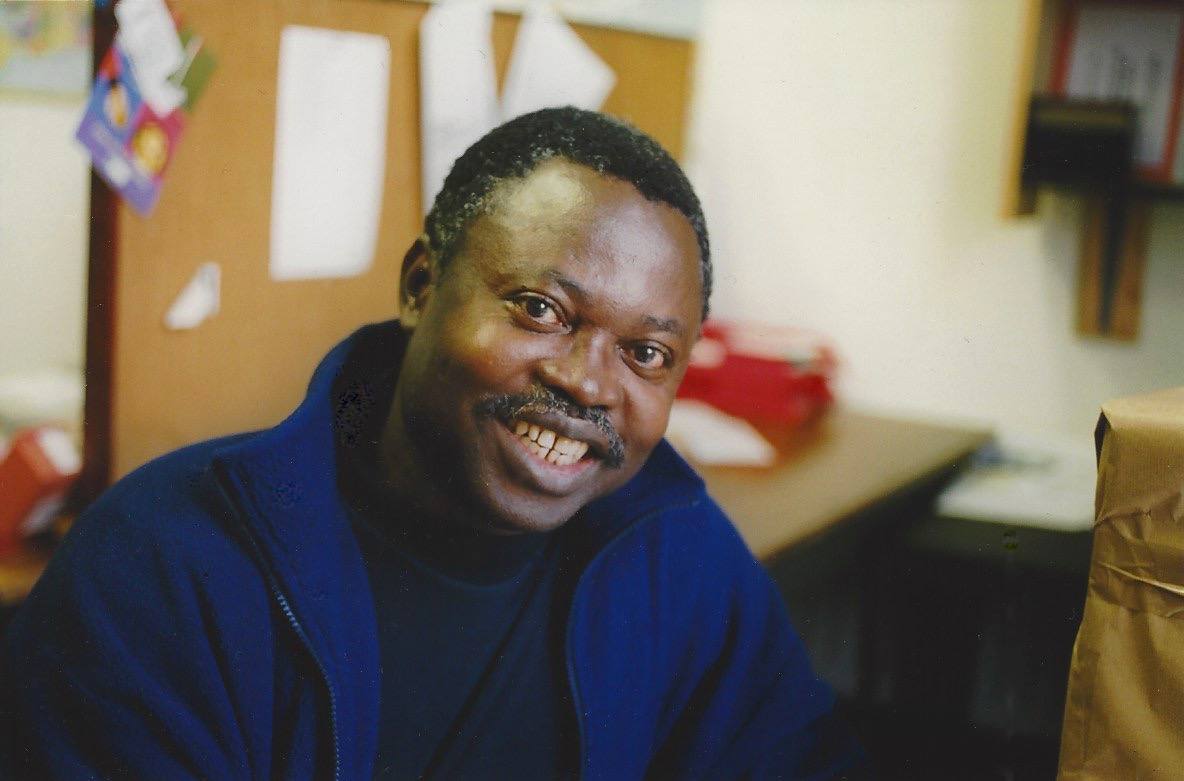
- Born: 1948
- Died: 2021 (aged 72–73)
- Occupations: playwright, poet, short story writer, actor, theatre director, film producer and academic.

Sam Ukala (1948–2021) was described as a 'great literary icon'. He was a Nigerian playwright, poet, short story writer, actor, theatre director, film producer and academic.

== Professional life ==
Sam Ukala was a Professor of Theatre Arts and Drama at Delta State University, Abraka, Nigeria. Ukala was also Professor of Drama and Theatre Arts at a number of Nigerian universities, including Edo State University. From 1993-1994, as a Commonwealth academic staff fellow, he also researched and taught at the School of English Workshop Theatre of the University of Leeds in the United Kingdom. As an academic, he propounded the theory of 'folkism', the tendency to base literary plays on indigenous history and culture and to compose and perform them in accordance with the aesthetics of African folktale composition and performance. He was Chairman of the Delta State Chapter of the Association of Nigerian Authors (ANA) 2021.

== Writings ==
Ukala's published plays include The Slave Wife, The Log in Your Eye, Akpakaland (winner of the 1989 ANA/British Council Prize for Drama), Break a Boil and Placenta of Death. His Iredi War, a 'folk script', won the 2014 Nigeria prize for Literature. It is based on the 1906 uprising of the Owa Kingdom (now part of Delta State) against oppressive British rule. As in previous pieces, he utilizes and brings new life to oral literature and folk-based theatre forms.

Ukala has also worked with the British theatre Horse and Bamboo Theatre in 1998-1999 and with Bob Frith wrote the visual theatre piece Harvest of Ghosts, which toured the UK and the Netherlands. This was an experimental piece for Ukala, which relied on dance, music, and powerful visuals rather than the spoken word. Professor Martin Banham, joint editor of African Theatre: Playwrights & Politics, considered it a 'dynamic fusion of inter-cultural skills', and a 'striking, accessible', example of political theatre. He felt the play deserved a production in Africa and, eventually, Sam Ukala did create a version at Edo State University in Ekpoma.

== Folkism ==
Ukala developed an approach to theatre that he pioneered in his own dramatic writings. He called this 'folkism', and explored the concept further in his academic work. 'Folkism' grew from his belief in the necessity of decolonization in theatre, and the desire to explore African traditional standards of beauty and dramatic balance. In the construction of his plays he draws on an African oral tradition. In particular he develops material from the oral tradition of the Ika people (of the northwest region of Delta State in Nigeria). This he works into modern dramatic forms. When in Leeds in 1993-1994 he was researching English popular theatre, which led him to discovering the work of Horse and Bamboo Theatre in Lancashire. Their work was actually very far from being traditional theatre, as it used contemporary visual theatre forms, but Ukala was inspired by what he saw as its folk-based inspiration. In 1995 Bob Frith, Horse and Bamboo's founder and director, suggested a collaboration; Sam agreed and this began in November 1998.

== Awards and honors ==
- Nigeria Prizes for Science and Literature (Literature) for Iredi War. The largest African literary prize.
- 2000 Association of Nigerian Authors (ANA) Pillar of Arts Award for Prose for Skeletons: A Collection of Short Stories.
- 1989 ANA/British Council Prize for Drama for Akpakaland.

== See also ==
- List of Nigerian film producers
