= Sara Peattie =

American puppeteer

Sara Peattie (born 1951) is a giant puppet artist and runs Boston's Puppet Free Library.

== Career ==
An alumna of Antioch College, Peattie began her puppetry career in 1969 at the age of 18 when she studied under Peter Schumann, cofounder of the politically radical Bread & Puppet Theater. She left high school and travelled with Bread & Puppet Theatre to Europe for a year where she participated in street actions in Eastern Europe and to protest the Vietnam war and "tangle[d] with police forces".

=== Puppeteers Cooperative ===
Peattie founded The Puppeteers Cooperative in 1976 with fellow puppeteer George Konnoff in San Francisco. The Puppeteers Cooperative is a nonprofit association of puppeteers, theatre artists and musicians that help build community outreach and education.

=== Puppet Free Library ===
Peattie founded and manages Boston's Puppet Free Library. The library is in the basement of Emmanuel Episcopal Church, Boston. It houses a collection of large puppets that can be lent to users for parades and other events. It also houses Peattie's studio. The puppets are often used by schools and in parades, including Boston's First Night New Year's celebration. The puppets are generic characters (e.g., giant cats, flowers, dragons), as opposed to specific persons (e.g., Donald Trump) or characters (e.g., Pinocchio).

== Publications ==
Peattie is the author of the booklet "68 Ways to Make Really Big Puppets".

== Honors ==
In 2016 Peattie received the annual Paul Vincent Davis Award from the Puppet Showplace Theater in Brookline, MA for her lifetime contribution to puppet making.
