= Islewilde =

Islewilde is a community-created art and performance festival that takes place each August on Vashon Island, WA.

== History ==
Islewilde was founded in 1992 by UMO, a Vashon Island-based physical theater troupe, who patterned Islewilde loosely after Vermont's Bread and Puppet Theater. The philosophy behind the festival is that communal creation of art helps to foster a vibrant community. "Community Creating Art Creating Community" is a slogan of the group. UMO spent four years actively organizing Islewilde before handing it off to members of the Vashon arts community, who have run the festival since with limited continuing involvement from its founders.

While initially designed primarily with the Vashon Island community in mind, the festival has attracted and retained both national and international celebration artists, including, notably, members of Seattle's Fremont Arts Council, Minneapolis' In the Heart of the Beast Puppet and Mask Theatre, Olympia's Procession of the Species, and Taiwan's Dream Community.

Islewilde is notable in that there is no exchange of money during the festival weekend. There is no admission charge (there is a fee to take associated workshops) and often a community dinner is served.

== Structure of Festival ==
=== Theme ===
At an annual community Dream Retreat a theme is brainstormed that becomes the guiding concept for that year's festival. Themes often center around Vashon life, especially as related to it being an island, but themes have also been about national political issues or been whimsical.

=== Workshops ===
For two weeks prior to the event, Islewilde features workshops by which, through the learning and application of various theatrical, artistic, and celebratory crafts and skills, the festival is designed, built, and rehearsed. Typical workshops have included Mask Making, Giant Puppet Building, Lantern Making, Batiking, Stilt Walking, Acting Troupe, Circus Troupe, Jug Band.

During the workshop period, participants are encouraged to camp and eat together to form a creative village.

=== Friday Night Illuminated Show ===
Islewilde traditionally begins on Friday evening with a community Lantern Walk through the festival grounds, currently Vashon's Agren Park. Following the Lantern Walk is an illuminated show that has featured shadow puppets, illuminated giant puppets, fire spinning/dancing, etc.

=== Saturday Shows ===
The number and variety of shows change from year to year depending on the interests and energy of the community, but traditionally Islewilde puts on two feature shows: The Waterbucket Circus, a comic, faux circus; and The Islewilde Pageant, a theatrical piece that features a large cast of community members and large-scale, beautiful images and works of art, often including giant puppets. The Pageant is in keeping with the year's theme and generally has a storyline of positive community transformation after the community has been challenged by corruptive influences. On Saturday evening there has traditionally been an open-mic style cabaret show for those who have worked on the festival.
