= Shamshad Khan =

British writer (born 1964)

Shamshad Khan (born 1964, Leeds) is a widely anthologised Manchester-based poet.

Khan was born in Leeds in 1964 in a Pakistani family which later relocated to Manchester. Khan's poems have been published in anthologies including Flame, Poetry of Rebellion, The Fire People (1998), Bittersweet (1999), Healing Strategies for Women at War, Gargoyle, Longman’s GCSE Poems for your Pocket, Velocity and Redbeck Press’ anthology of British South Asian poets. Her 1994 short story, ‘The Woman and the Chair’ received critical acclaim. She has performed her work widely, and been broadcast on local and national radio in the UK including the BBC's Radio 4’s Love Thang and Woman’s Hour. Khan has also worked as an editor on an anthology of black women’s poetry and advised the Arts Council of England North West on literature.

She also presented a Radio 4 programme on the Qaṣīda al-Burda (also known as The Poem of the Cloak).

== Books ==
- 'The Woman and the Chair', in R. Ahmad and R. Gupta, eds., Flaming Spirits. London: Virago Press.
- (ed. with Marie Guise Williams and Tang Line) Healing Strategies for Women at War: Seven black women poets. Manchester: Crocus Books, 1999.
- Khan, Shamshad (2007) Megalomaniac, (Salt Modern Poets), Salt Publishing (ISBN 1844713121 ISBN 978-1-84471-312-7)
