= In the Heart of the Beast Puppet and Mask Theatre =

Puppet company and non-profit organization in Minneapolis

Coordinates: 44°56′55″N 93°15′13″W

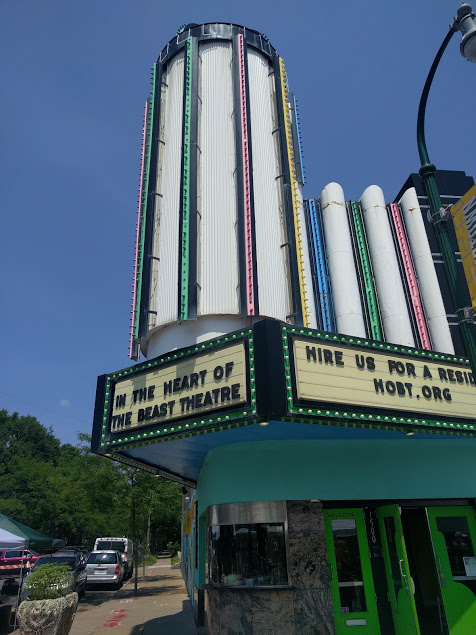
- Theatre entrance and marquee
- Address: Minneapolis, Minnesota; United States
- Type: Regional theater

Construction
- Opened: 1973

Website
- hobt.org

In the Heart of the Beast Puppet and Mask Theatre (also known as Heart of the Beast or HOBT) is an American puppet company and nonprofit organization based in Minneapolis, Minnesota. The theatre serves audiences through puppetry performance and education. The company has written and performed scores of full-length puppet plays, performed throughout the United States, Canada, Korea, and Haiti and toured the Mississippi River from end to end. The theatre historically sponsored the annual May Day Parade and Ceremony that was seen by as many as 50,000 people each year.

== History ==
HOBT began in 1973 as Powderhorn Puppet Theatre, named for Powderhorn Park in Minneapolis. In 1975, the theatre organized their first May Day procession and event. About 50 to 60 people and a few puppets marched, raised a maypole in the park, and had some speeches. In the next years, the event grew and evolved into a way to celebrate community builders.

In 1979, the theatre changed its name based on a suggestion by poet and theatre member Steven Lisner. In 1987, they moved into the rented Avalon Theatre, a former cinema originally built in 1909 as the Royal Theatre. HOBT then purchased the Avalon Theatre in 1990 for the building and staging of productions.

In 1999, the Weisman Art Museum at the University of Minnesota exhibited Theatre of Wonder: Twenty-five Years In the Heart of the Beast, celebrating the works and productions by the theatre.

In 2017, the theatre received $275,000 from the will of Sarah Bowman, a performer and longtime supporter of the theatre. The funds were used in upgrading the theatre building. In 2018, the organization was awarded a grant by The Jerome Foundation. This ongoing effort also supports renovation of East Lake Street properties impacted by civil unrest during the George Floyd protests in Minneapolis–Saint Paul.

In April 2023, HOBT launched a free puppet & mask lending library, which includes free programming, such as puppet story time and make and take crafts.

In late 2024, In the Heart of the Beast announced that the theatre would be moving out of the Avalon Theatre, citing the need for increased accessibility as a primary reason for the decision.

== Productions ==
Over the years, productions have used various styles of puppet and mask performances, including bunraku and larger-than-life puppets. These include:

- "Haunted Avalon" (2023)
- "Puppet Fashion Show" (2023)
- "Impact Theory of Mass Extinction" by Junauda Petrus (2022)
- "The Minotaur or: Amelia Earhart is Alive and Traveling in the Underworld" (2018)
- "Make Believe Neighborhood", celebrating Mr. Rogers (2018)
- "La Natividad" (2016, 2014, 2012, 2008, 2007, 2006)
- "Crow Boy", based on the children's book by Taro Yashima (2016)
- "Queen" by Junauda Petrus and Erik Ehn (2016)
- "La Befana" (2010, 2001, 1995, 1991, 1989, 1988, 1984, 1983, 1982, 1981, 1979, 1974)
- "The Story of Iqbal Masih" (1997)
- "Don Quixote" (1994, 1993)
- "This Land", a tribute to Woody Guthrie (1993)
- "Beowulf" (1985)
- "The Fisherman and His Wife" (1975, 1974)

== May Day Parade and Tree of Life Ceremony ==
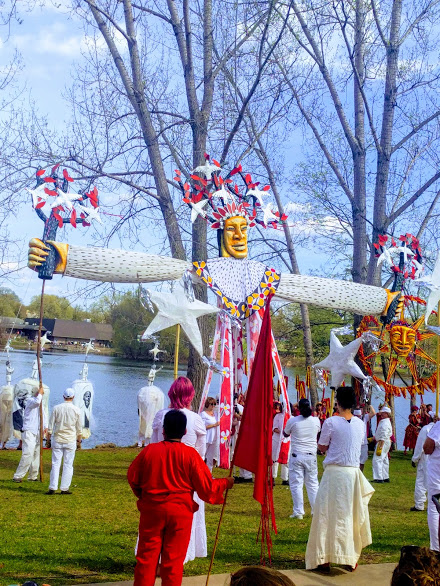
Larger-than-life puppet held up by numerous volunteers at the 2018 Tree of Life Ceremony.

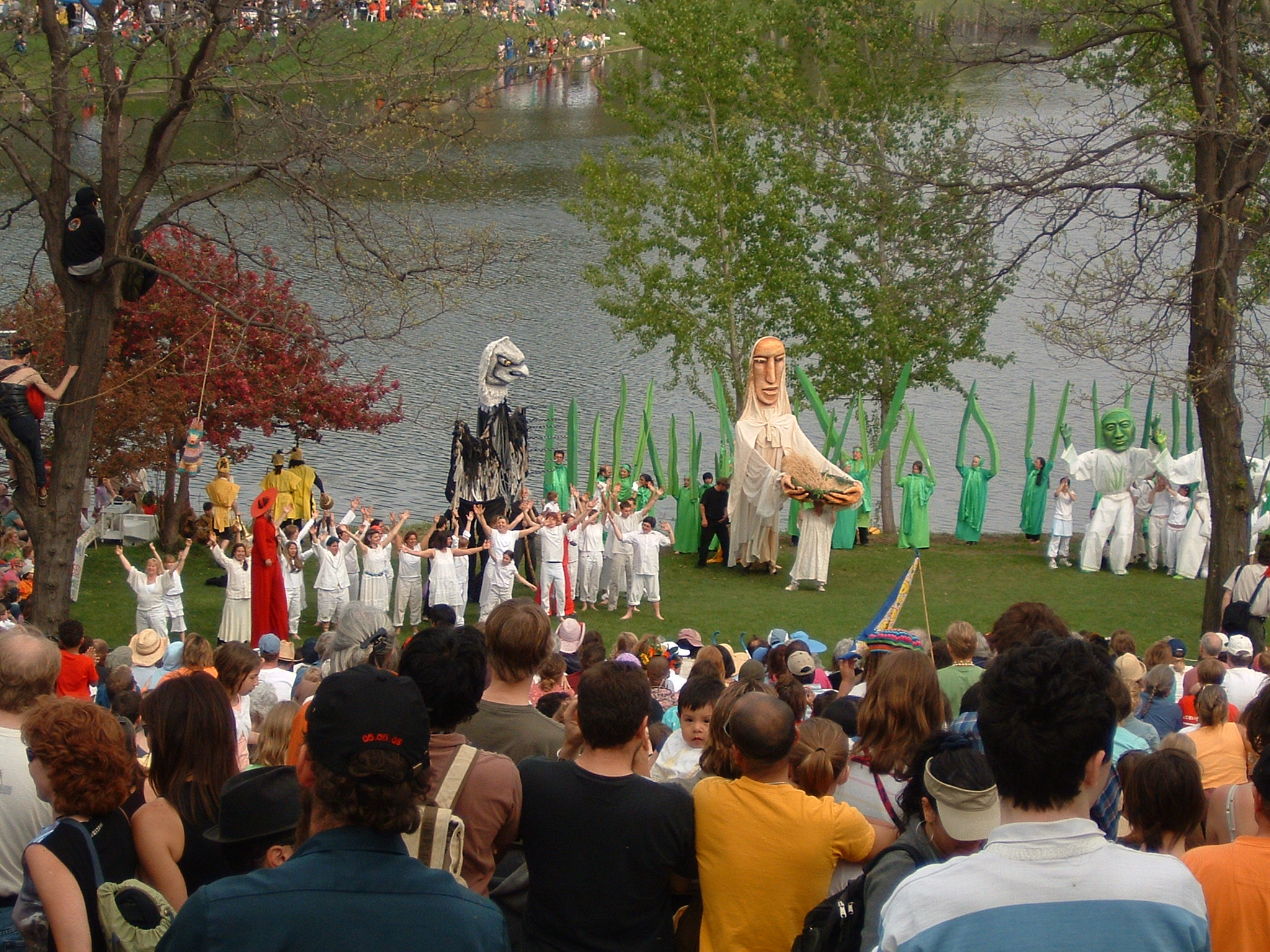
HOBT May Day Tree of Life Ceremony in Powderhorn Park.

The annual parade hosted by In the Heart of the Beast Theatre drew large crowds and showcased large puppets and floats and entertainment by performers. Each year's parade/festival had a theme, ranging from Spring and environmental topics to social topics like peace and racial justice. The event also featured a festival in Powderhorn Park and a Tree of Life Ceremony involving more than 300 performers.

In 2019, HOBT announced the 2019 May Day would be the last May Day they would organize, and that they would be taking time off from producing May Day to reimagine ways this celebration could be more decentralized, inclusive, accessible, and sustainable.

In March 2019, a short documentary entitled "Children of Spring" premiered. The documentary focuses on the children involved in the May Day parade and festival. The film premiere helped raise $15,000 for May Day. In February 2023, the Board of HOBT decided to release May Day Celebrations to the community. Following that announcement, future May Day events or actions were independently produced by community groups, and not part of official HOBT programming.

=== May Day Parade gallery ===
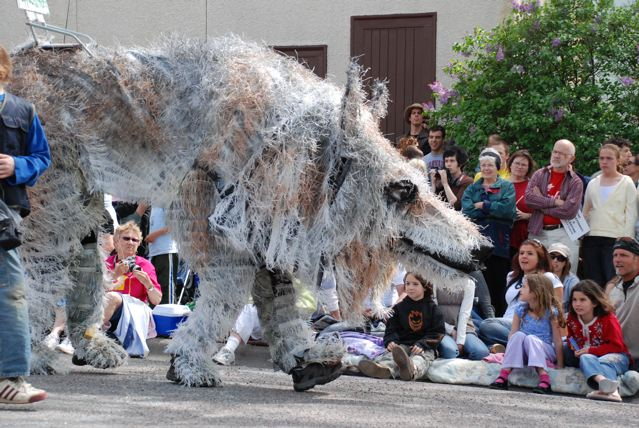

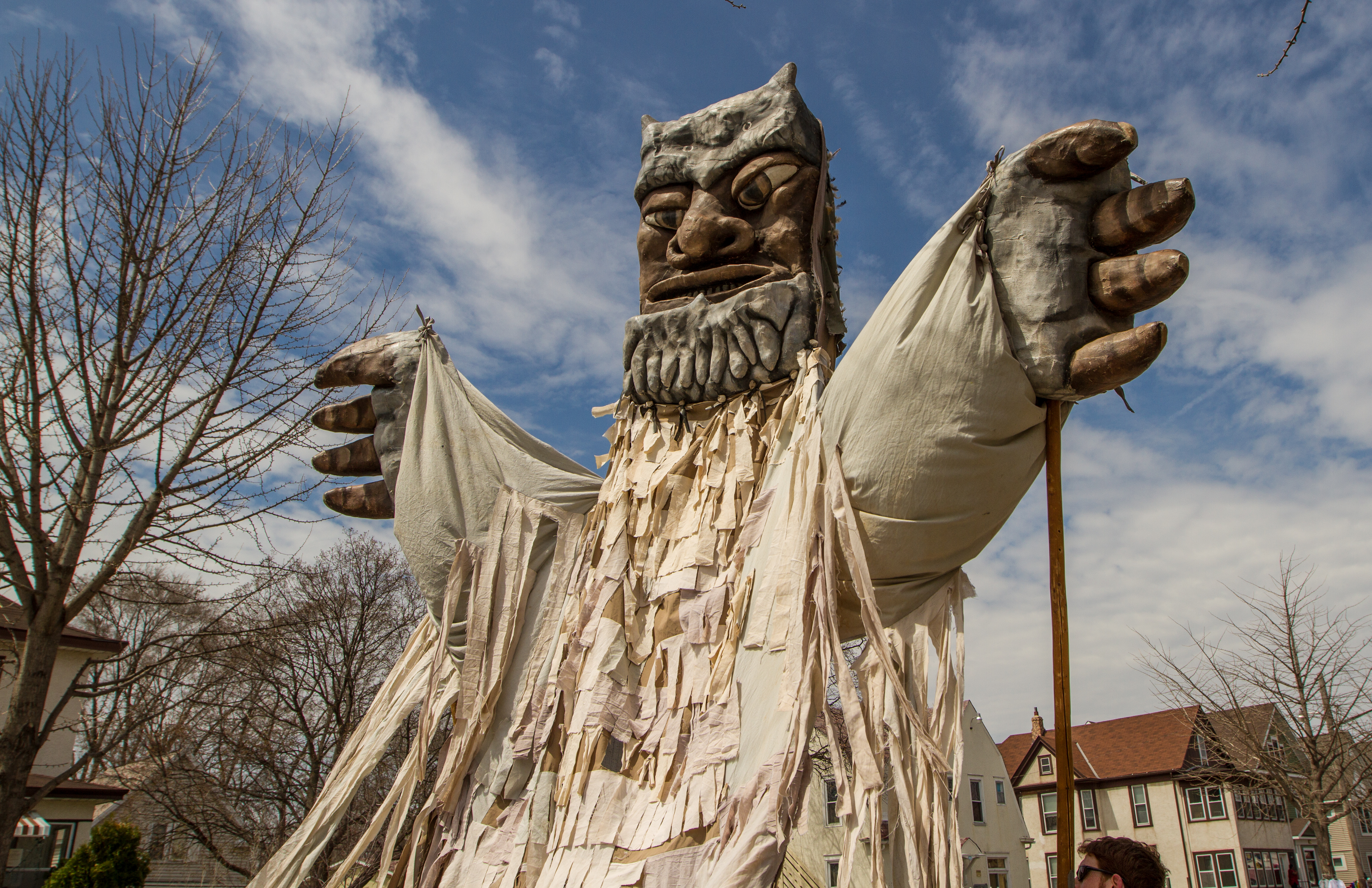

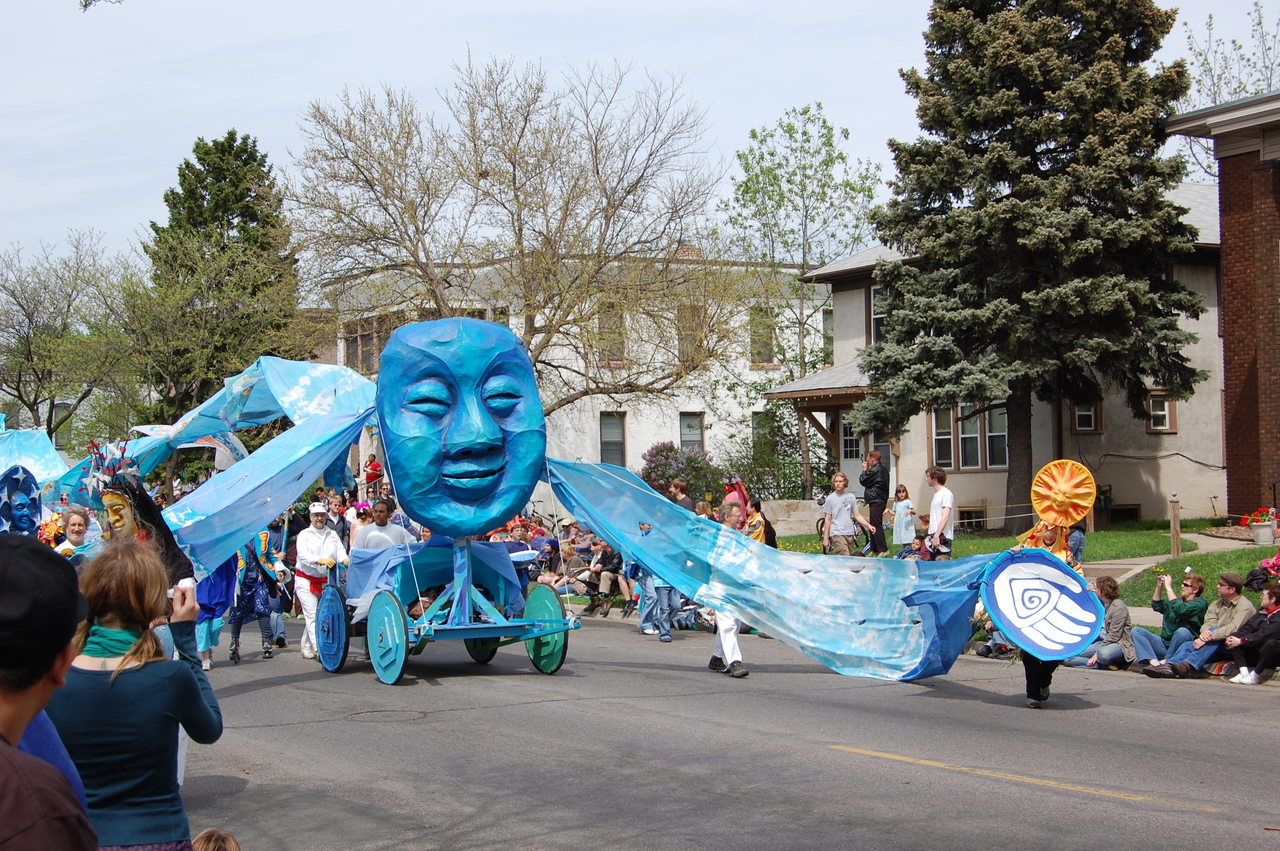

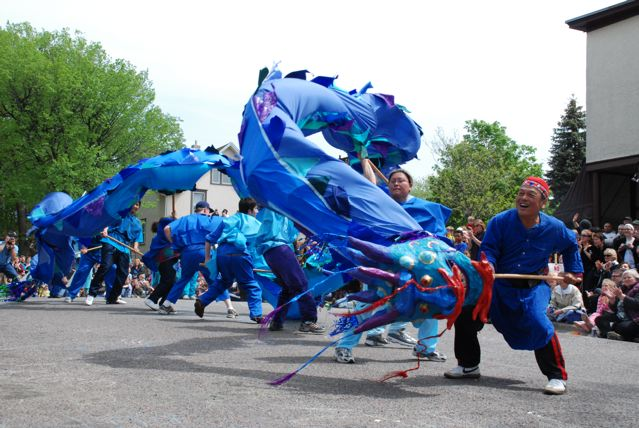

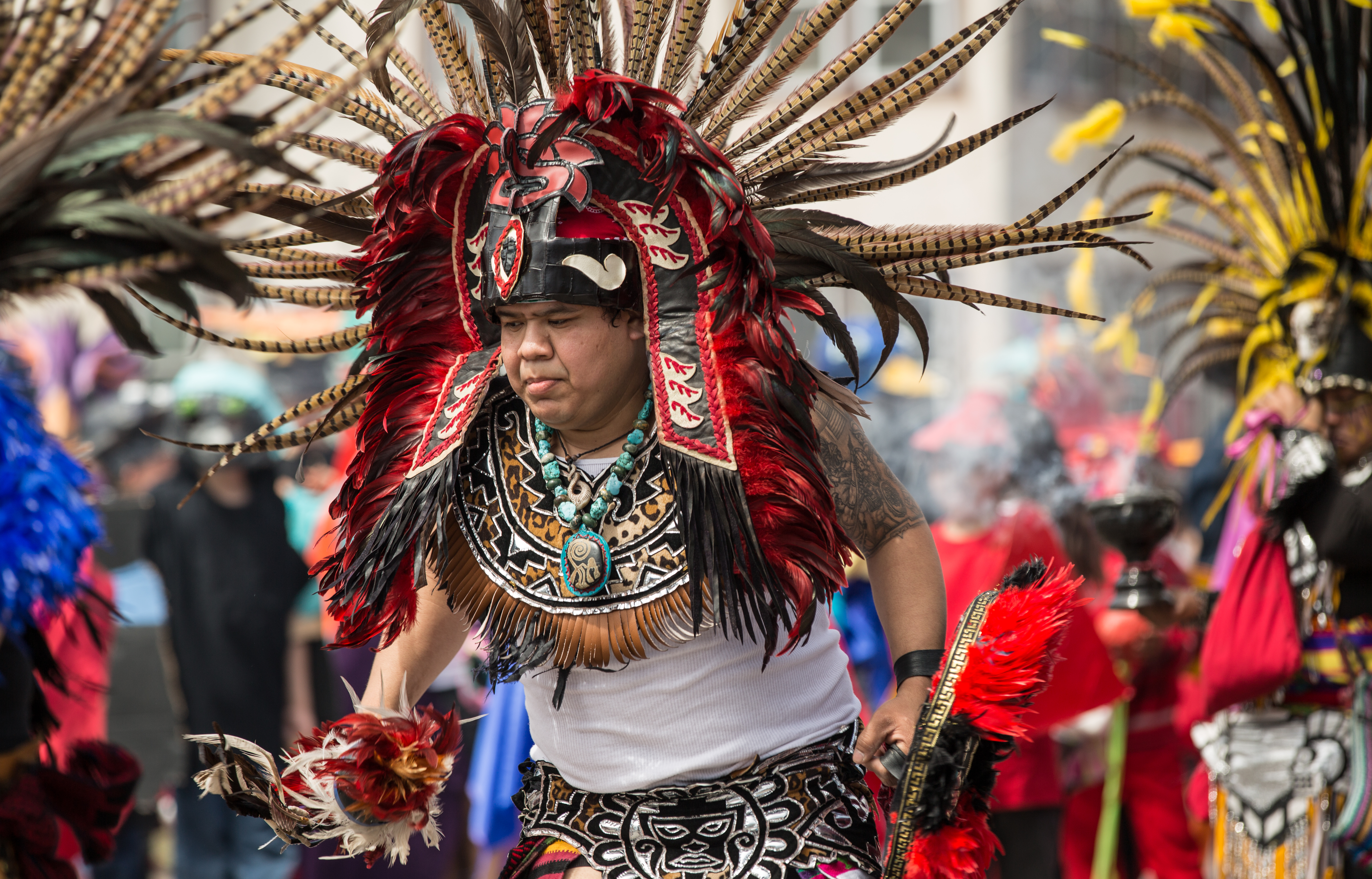

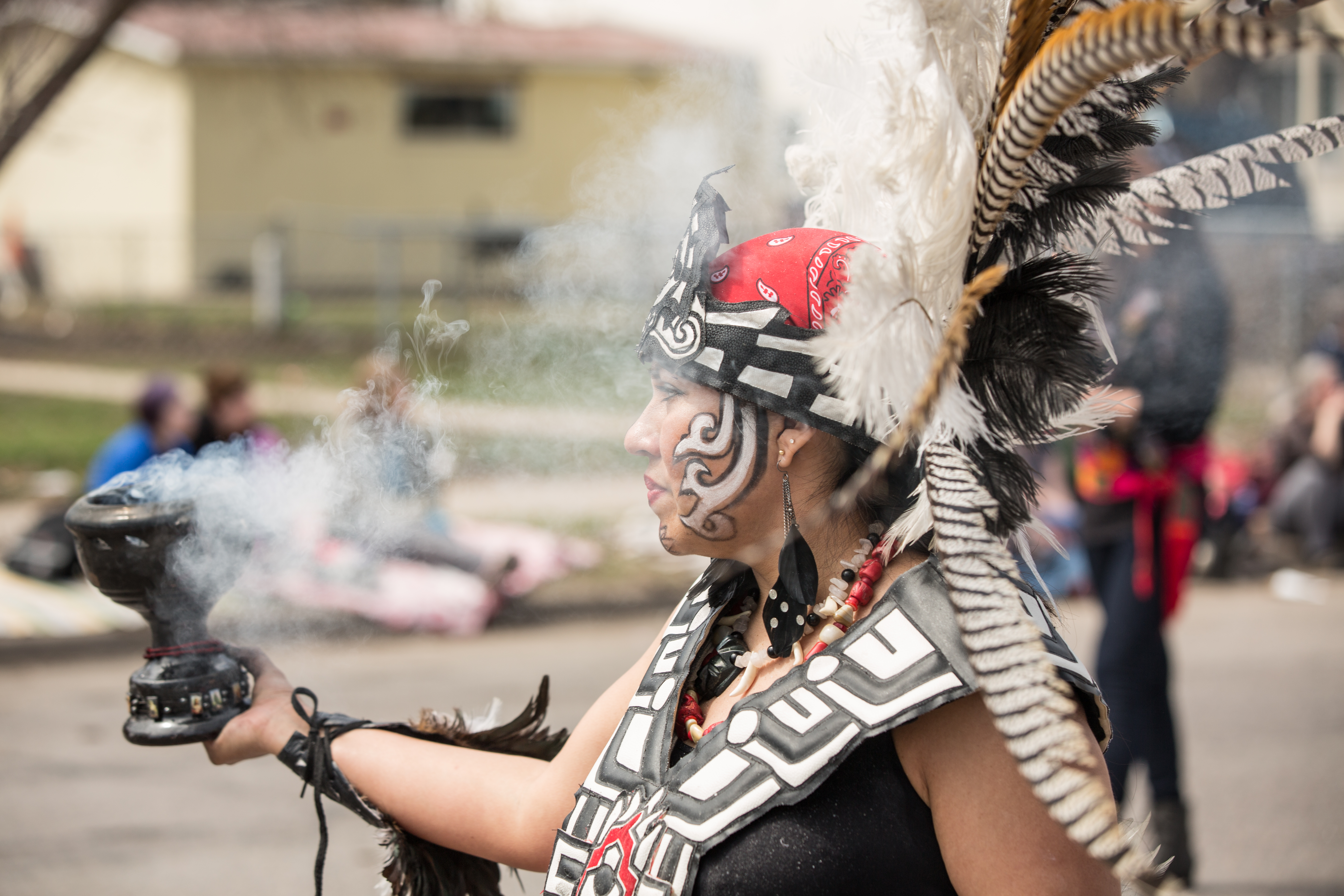

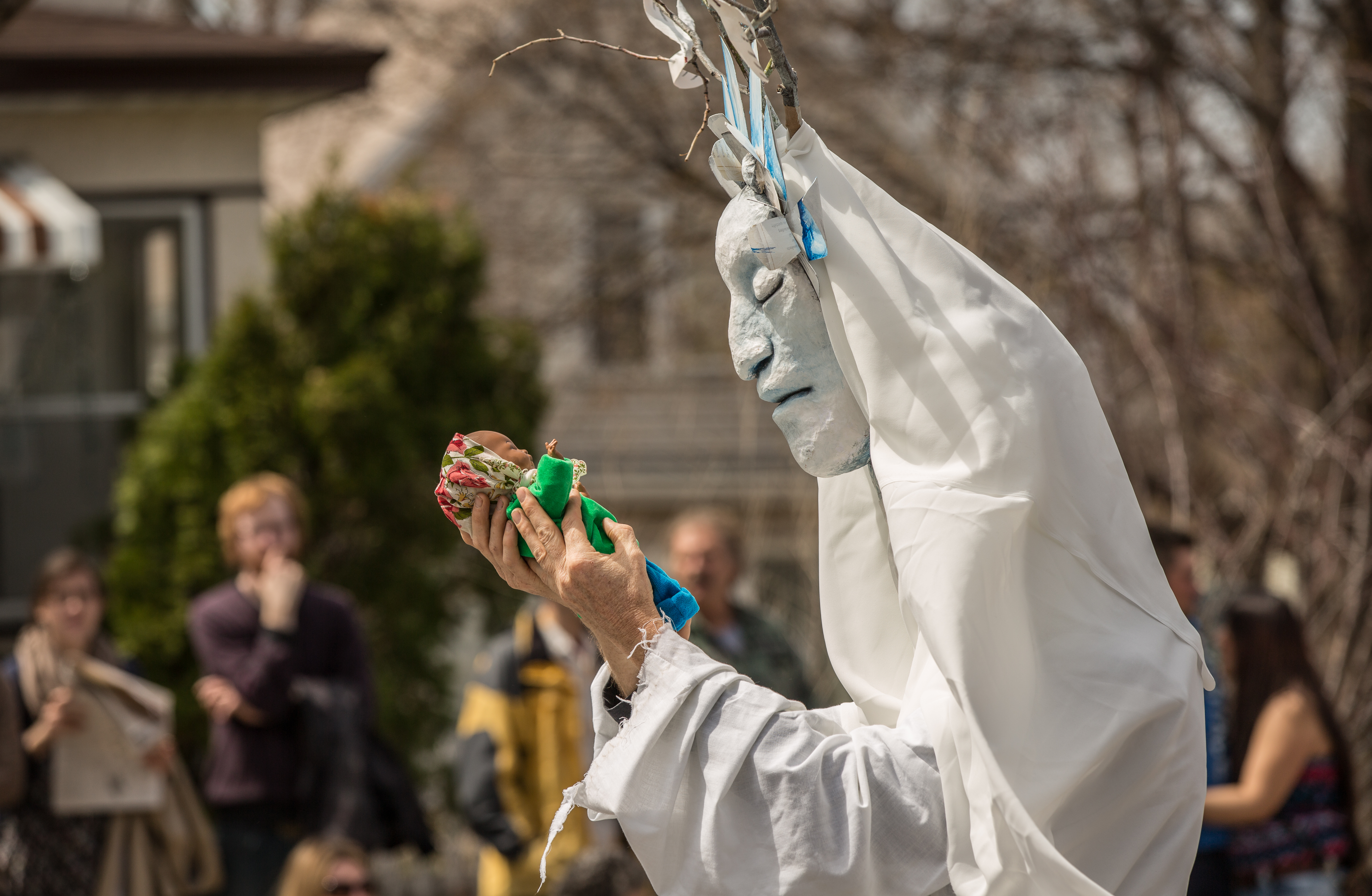

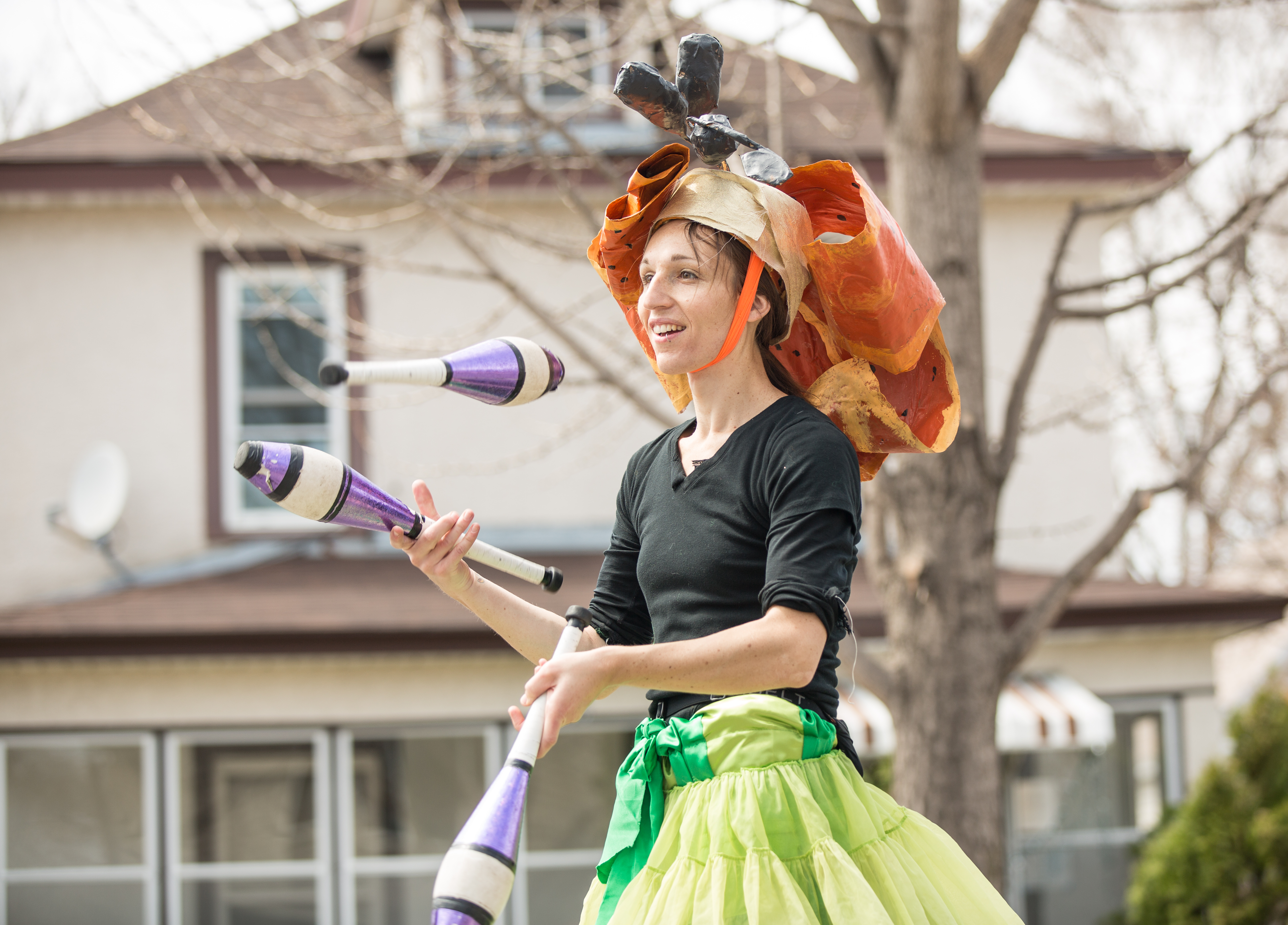

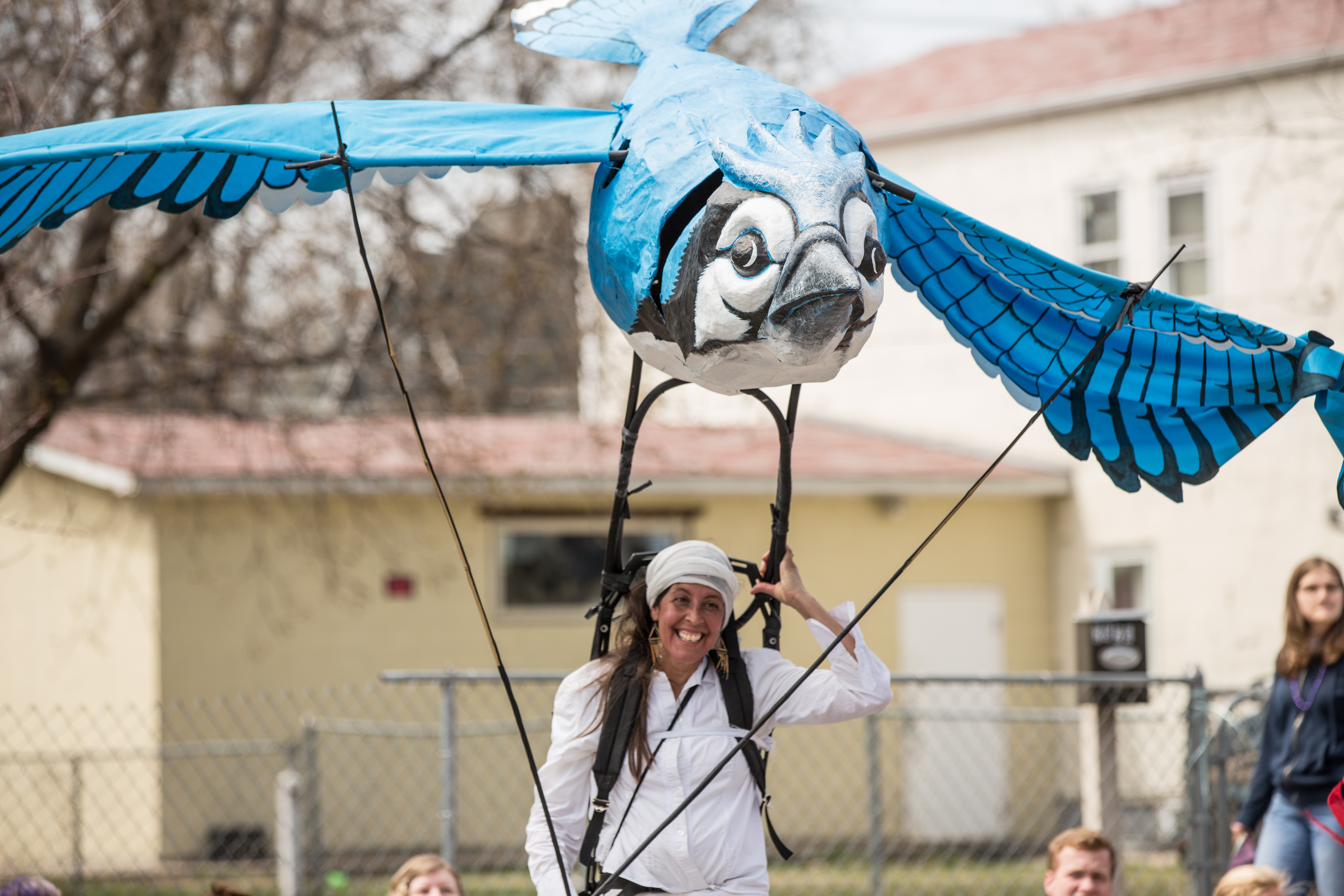

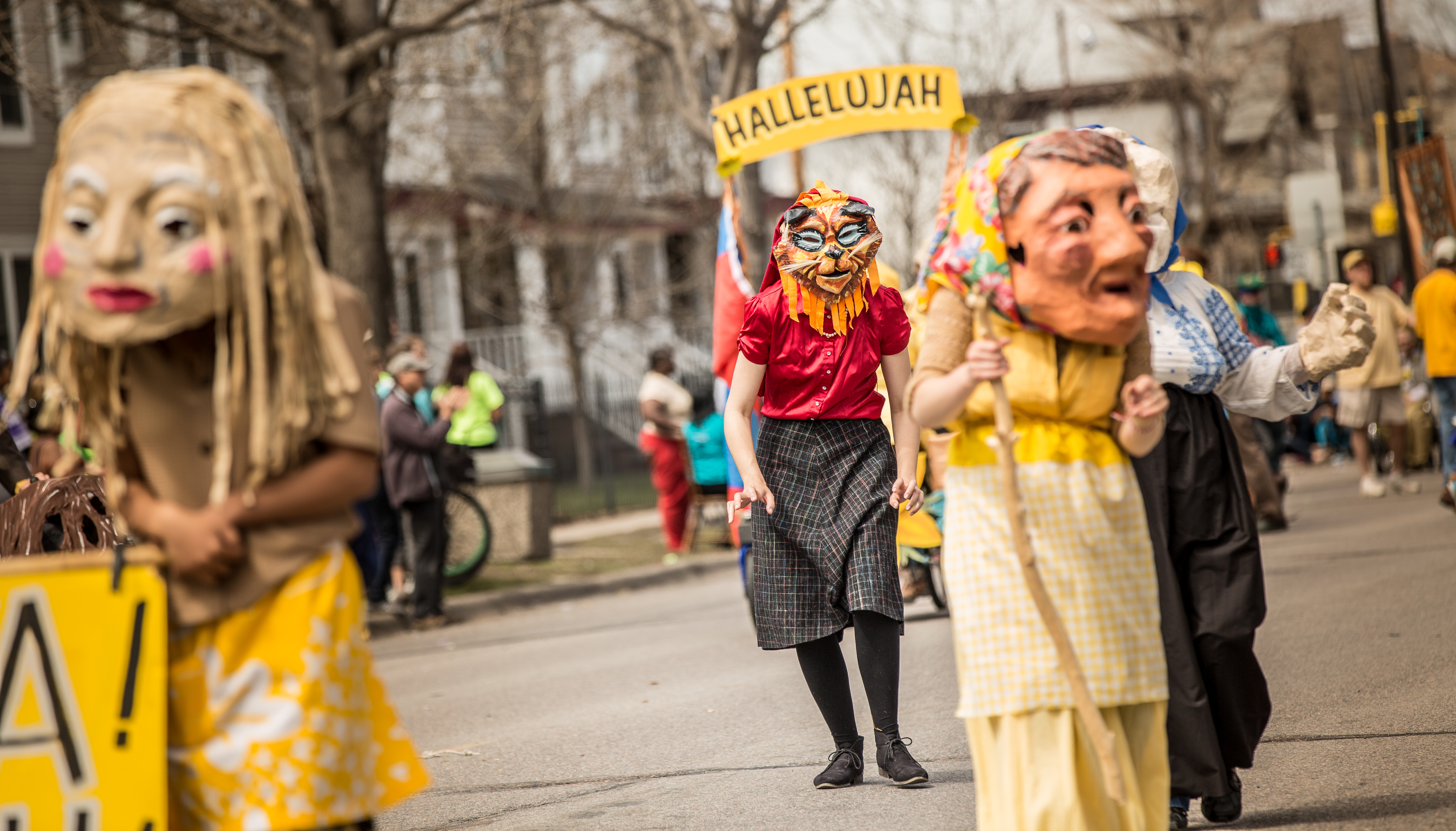

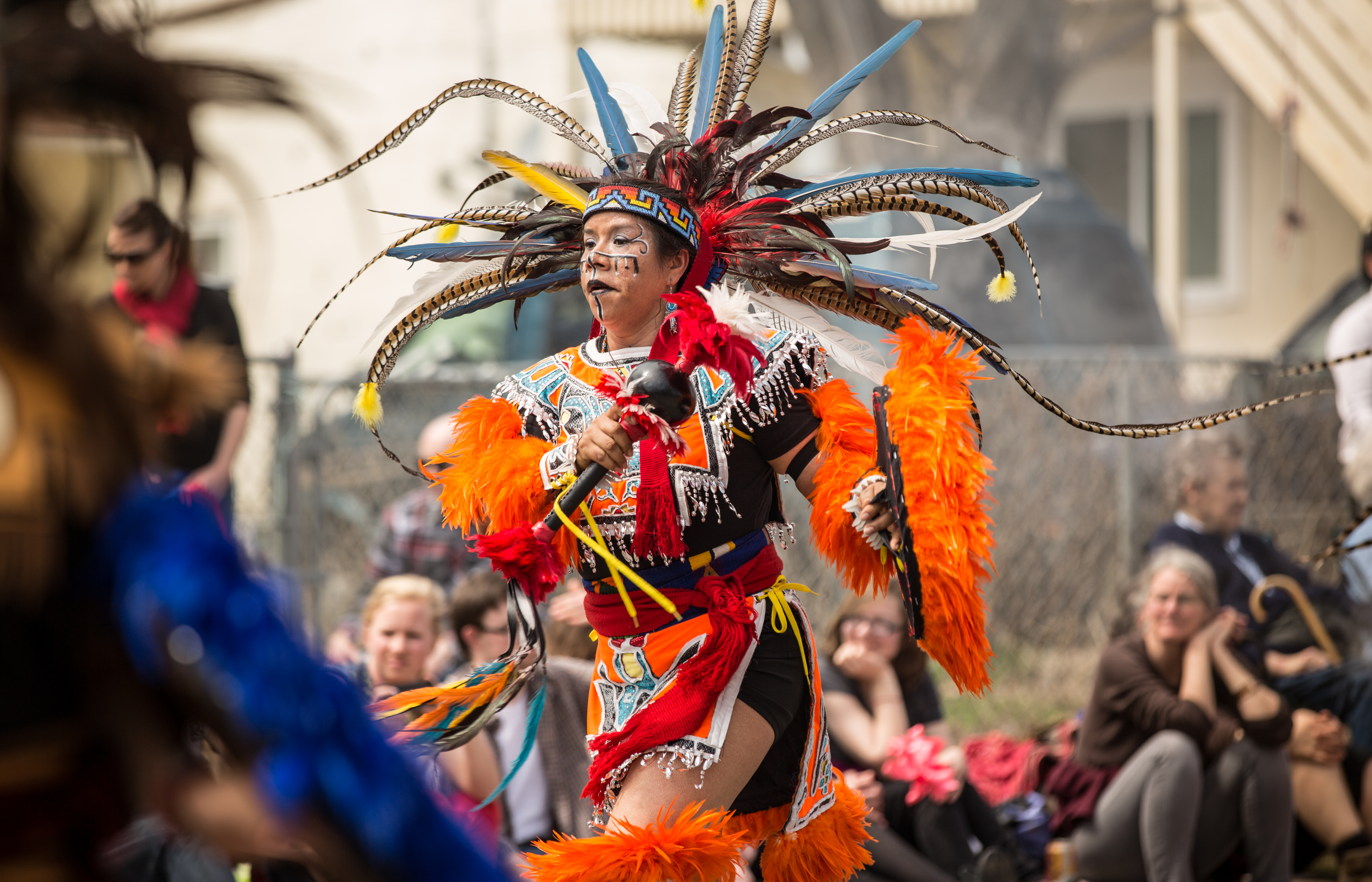

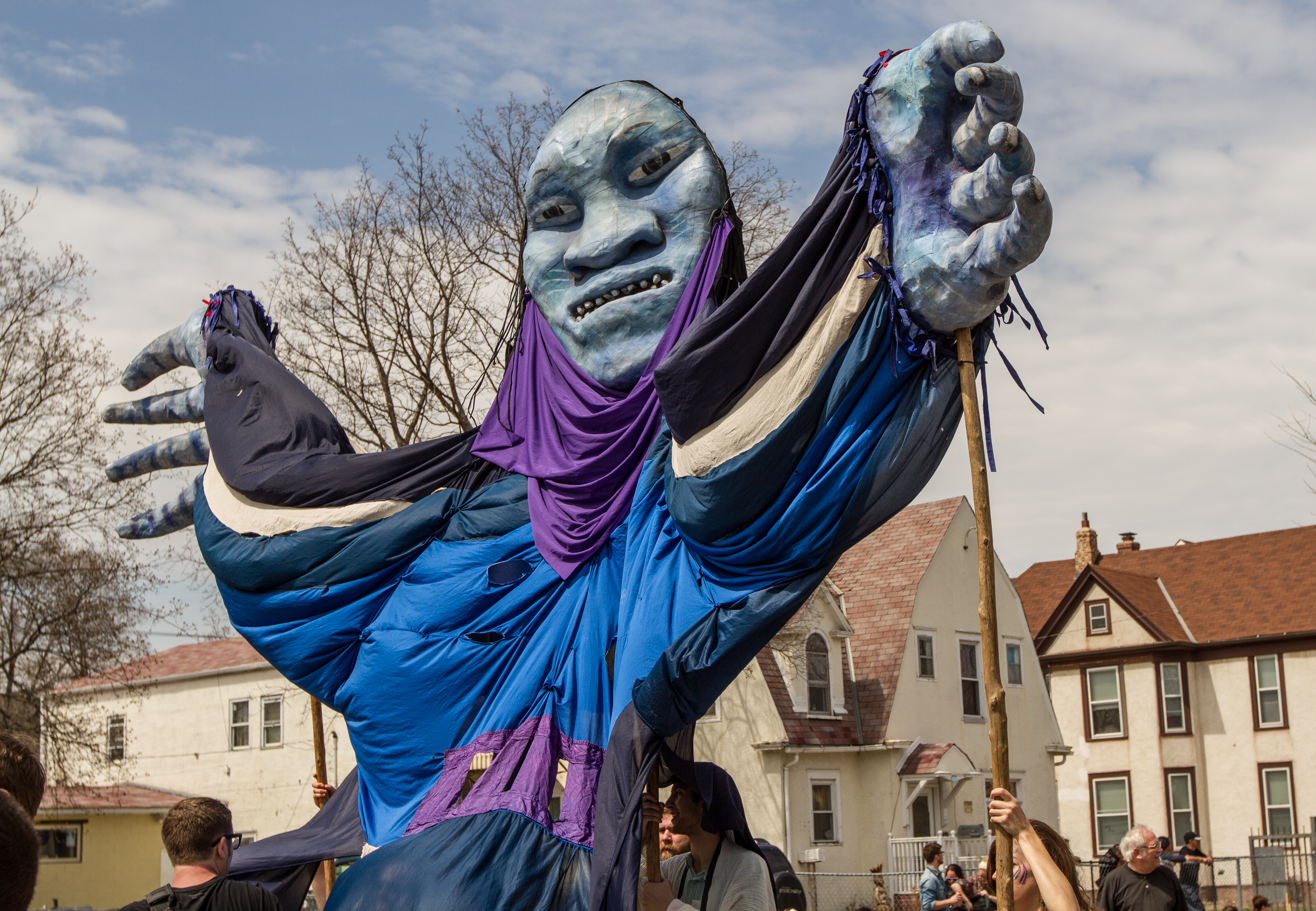

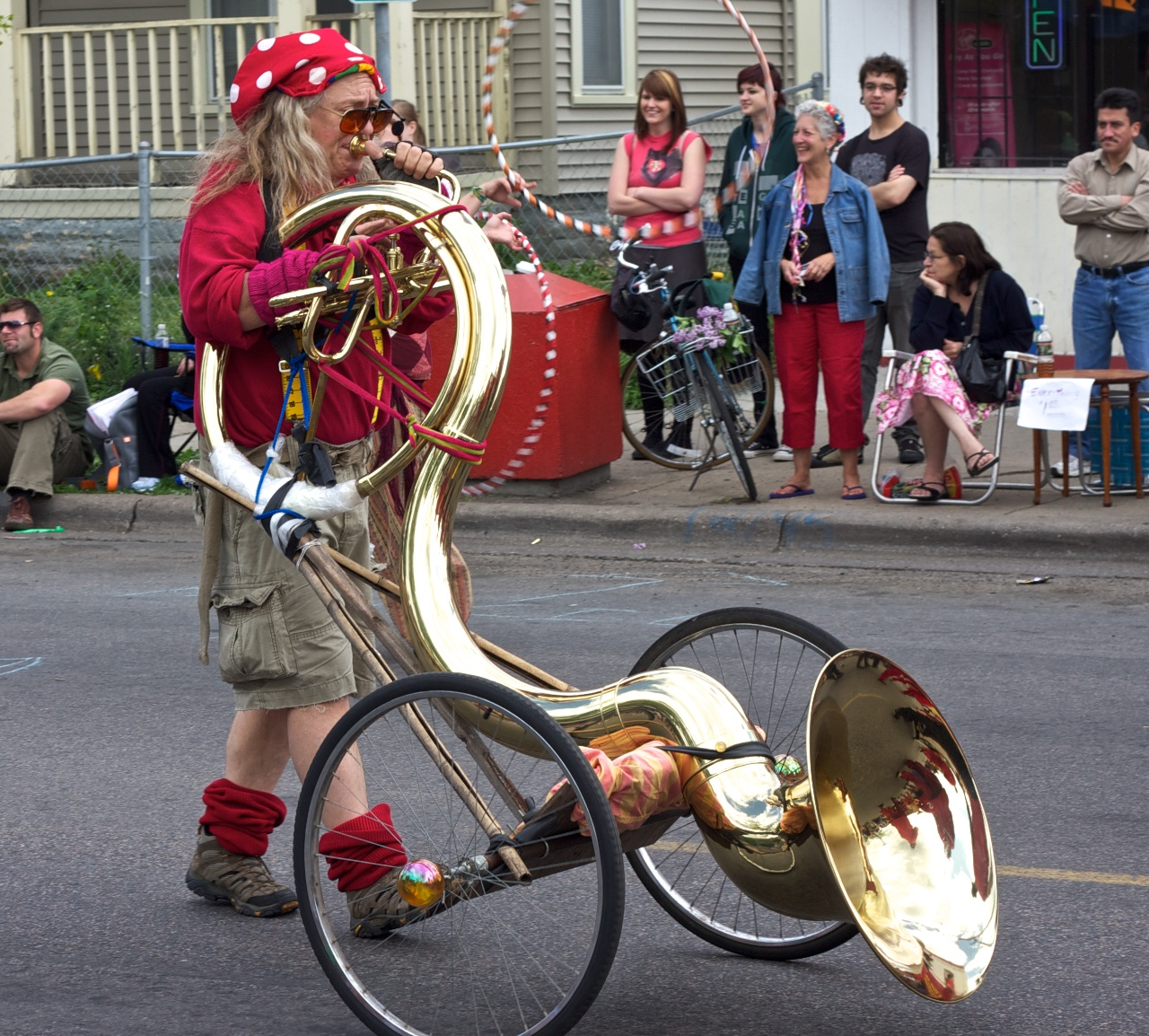

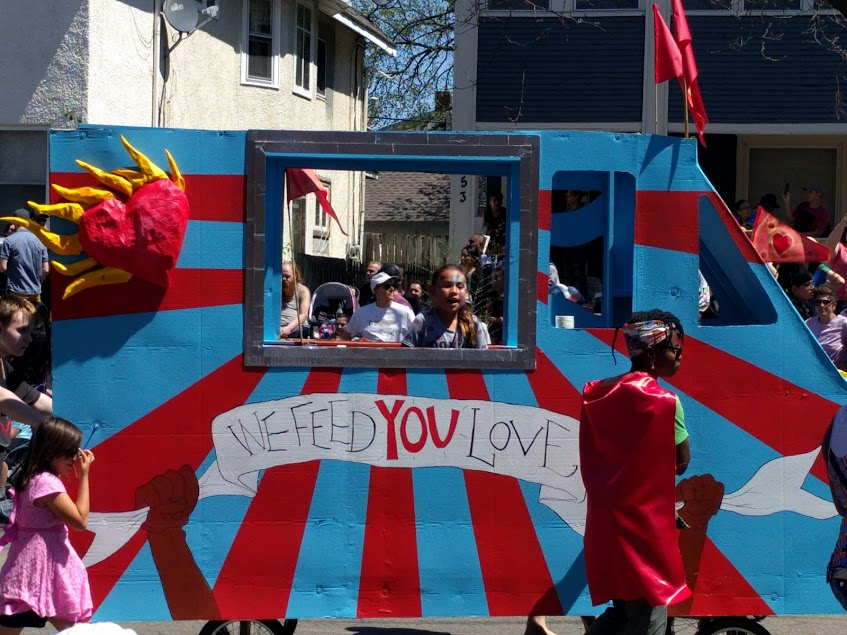

== See also ==
- Bread and Puppet Theater
- Center for Puppetry Arts
- Horse and Bamboo Theatre
- The Puppeteers Cooperative
- Spiral Q Puppet Theater
- Superior Concept Monsters
- Thingumajig Theatre
- Paperhand Puppet Intervention
