= The Puppeteers Cooperative =

Rights of Spring

The Puppeteers (or Puppeteers') Cooperative is an association of puppeteers, musicians, dancers, and singers, working to form community bonds through the medium of puppets, parades, and pageants. It is an extremely loose affiliation - there is no membership as such, so that people are sometimes surprised to find themselves belonging to the group without having joined it.

== History ==
The Puppeteers Cooperative was formed in San Francisco in 1976 by George Konnoff and Sara Peattie, two puppeteers formerly with the Bread and Puppet Theater. It was incorporated as a non-profit in Massachusetts1994. In 1993, Theresa Linnihan, then the director of the Newburyport Children's Theater at Maudslay State Park, met Konnoff, and joined in about 1997. George Konnoff died in 2001.

The Puppeteers Cooperative is known for its community outreach and education. The Cooperative has giant puppet pageants, community workshops that stress community involvement, and Free Puppet Lending Libraries that make giant puppets available to the general public. It publishes an educational booklet called "68 Ways to Make Really Big Puppets: A Patternbook of Parades and Pageants," web pages, and videos, all of which share ways of making giant puppets and spectacles from simple techniques and everyday materials. As well as the Lending Libraries, the group includes The Back Alley Puppet Theater, which does pageants, parades, and puppet dances in the Boston area; The Construction Section, giant puppet makers; Hi-Art Productions, video makers; and Puppaganda, which performs short and small news shows.

== Continuing events ==
- 1976 – present: the Back Alley Puppet Theater and later the Puppeteers Cooperative have participated in the First Night Boston Grand Processions. They also worked with other First Nights from around the country - Portsmouth, NH; Raleigh, NC; Pierce County, WA; St. Petersburg, FL; Pensacola, FL; Mobile, AL; State College, PA; Kingsport, TN; Owensboro, KY; Teaneck, NJ; Wilmington, DE; Jackson, MS; Hartford, CT; Binghamton, NY; Atlanta, GA; and Seattle, WA - to teach local puppeteers to make giant puppets and parades.
- 1994 – 2010: The Puppeteers Cooperative organized giant puppet pageants for the Lincoln Center Out of Doors festival, with the staff and students of the Lincoln Square Neighborhood Center, and other community and senior groups. These were often based loosely on Shakespeare plays.
- 1994 – present: The group organized, produced, and performed "The Rights (or Rites) of Spring," a free outdoor giant puppet pageant, in various states and venues. One of the earliest pageants – produced in 1994 in Yellow Springs, Ohio, in cooperation with Antioch College – was credited with causing a temporary break in rainy spring weather.
