= Procession of the Species =

Annual Earth Day celebration in Olympia, Washington, US

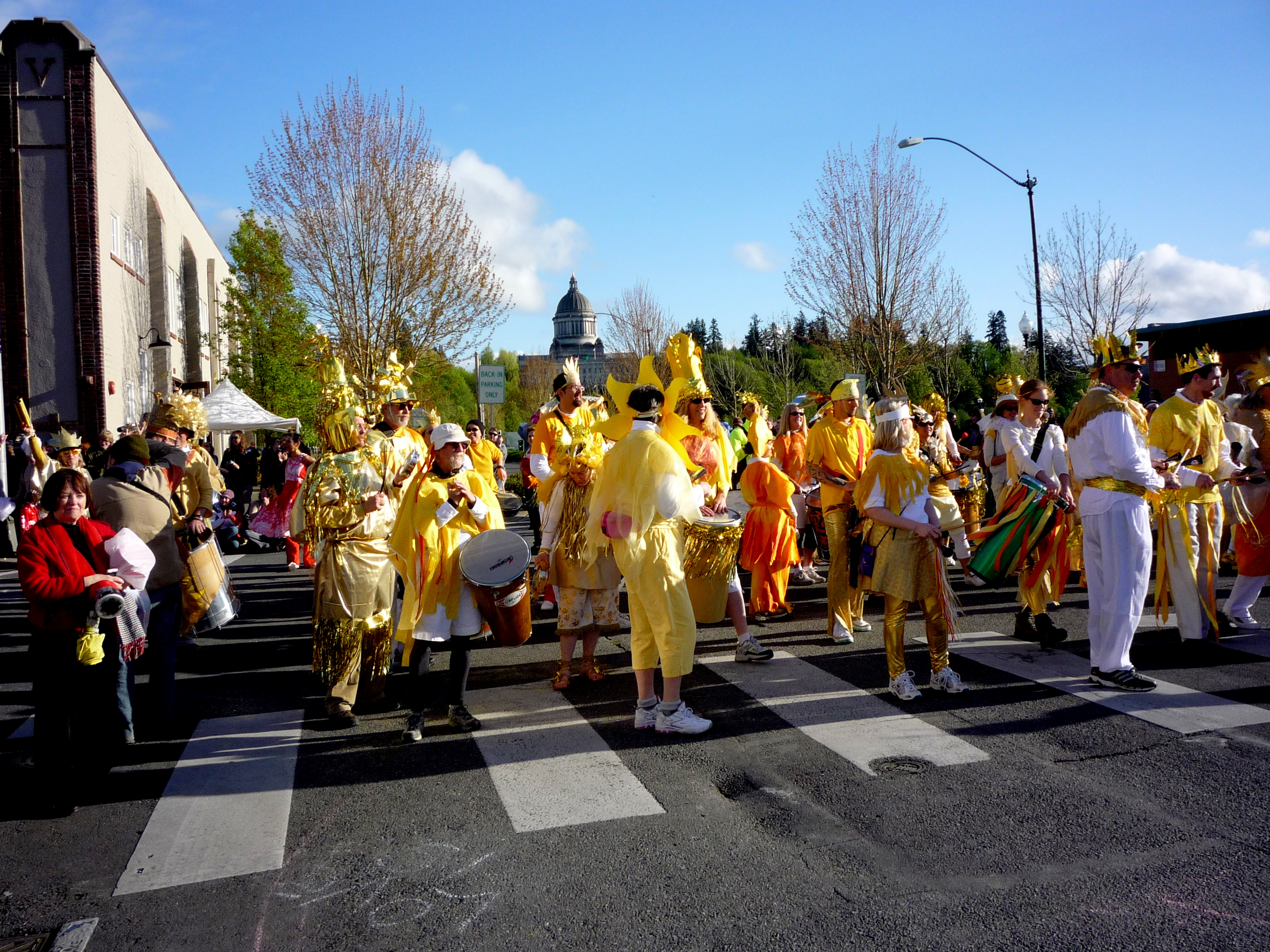
- Marchers at the 2010 event
- Genre: Community art
- Date: April 22 (Earth Day)
- Frequency: Annual
- Locations: Olympia, Washington, USA

The Procession of the Species Celebration is an annual, community arts-based Earth Day celebration in Olympia, Washington. It is the largest annual Earth Day celebration in the Puget Sound area and Cascadia bioregion.

The procession features a parade of costumed individuals and groups, non-motorized floats, and puppets with animal and element themes. Procession rules do not allow live pets, motorized vehicles, candy, or words. The procession began in 1995, operates without government support, and has earned national recognition.

== History ==
Started in 1995 by a group of Olympia residents, the procession was originally created to commemorate the 25th anniversary of Earth Day and to support Congressional renewal of the Endangered Species Act. A virtual procession was conducted in 2020.

== About ==
Taking place during Olympia's annual Spring Arts Walk, the procession regularly draws 30,000 spectators and 2,000–3,000 participants. The celebration, now in its 31st year, is completely noncommercial, made possible by community contributions of money, materials, time, and skills. The procession is produced by Earthbound Productions, a 501(c)(3) organization, which currently does not benefit from any public funding from the City of Olympia. Seven weeks before the procession, organizers establish a community art studio, open to the public for a minimal, optional donation. As there is no permanent studio space available for the procession, each year Earthbound Productions locates and rents a space to serve as the community art studio; ultimately, the group hopes to find a permanent location. The studio, staffed by volunteers, hosts art, music and costume design workshops. Participants use a wide range of artistic approaches, such as batik, papier mache, and luminaria. They use mostly donated or scavenged materials to express appreciation for the natural world and create costumes, banners, floats, puppets, drumming, community bands, and more. People of all ages join the procession itself, bedecked in costumes featuring the elements and various species of plants and animals. The procession has three rules: no live pets, no motorized vehicles, and no written words.

== Influence and Recognition ==
Inspired by Olympia's event, Procession of the Species celebrations have taken place elsewhere in the US and around the world. The procession in Bellingham, Washington, has taken place since 2004. It is a nationally recognized model for community arts-based involvement, environmental education, arts education, and cultural exchange.

In its July 2009 "Best of America" feature, Reader's Digest magazine honored the Procession of the Species with the top spot in its "can't resist" parades and processions list, after having considered 50,000 other celebrations in the United States.

== Image Gallery ==
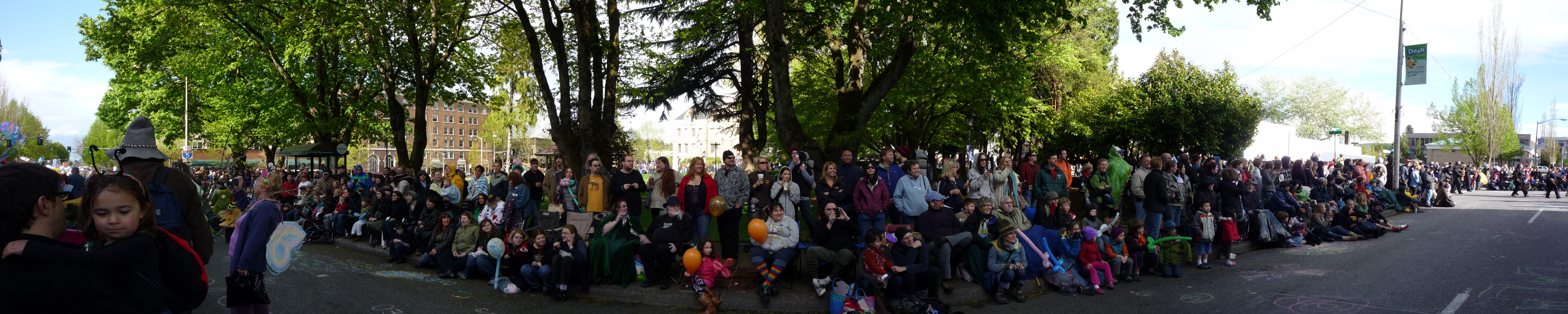
Panorama of spectators at the 2010 Procession

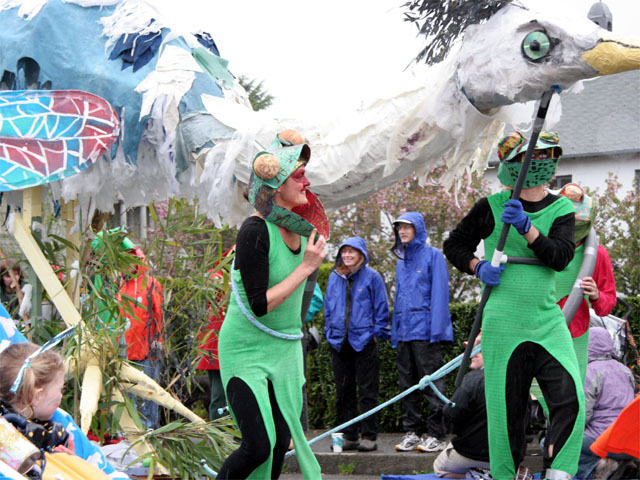
Frog display

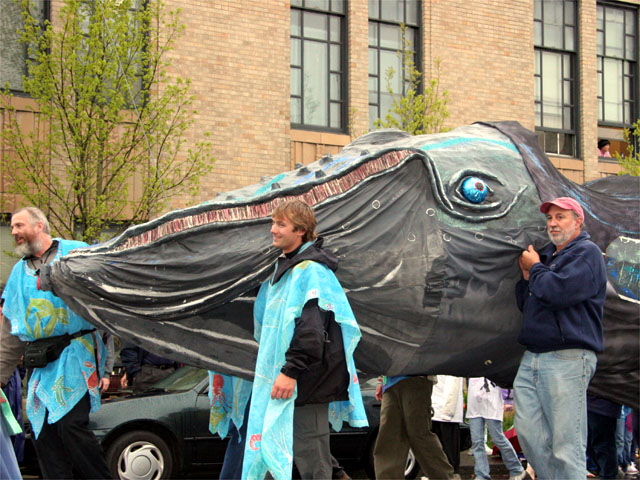
Whale display

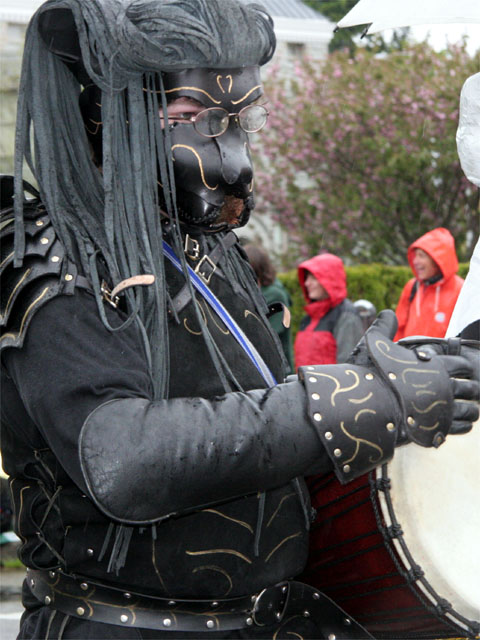
Black cat with glasses playing a drum

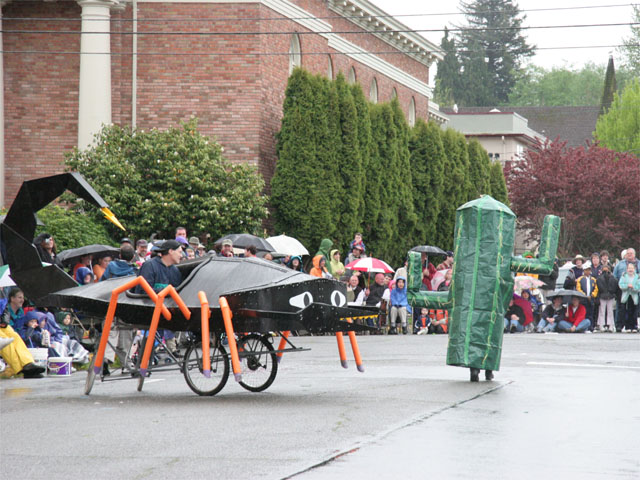
Cactus chased by a black scorpion

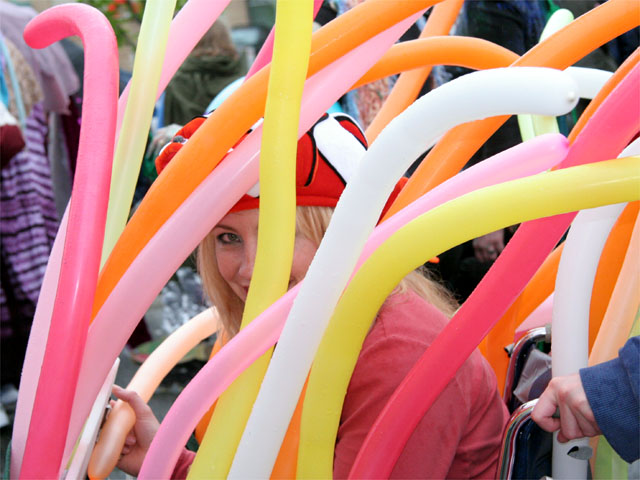
Sea anemone with a clownfish

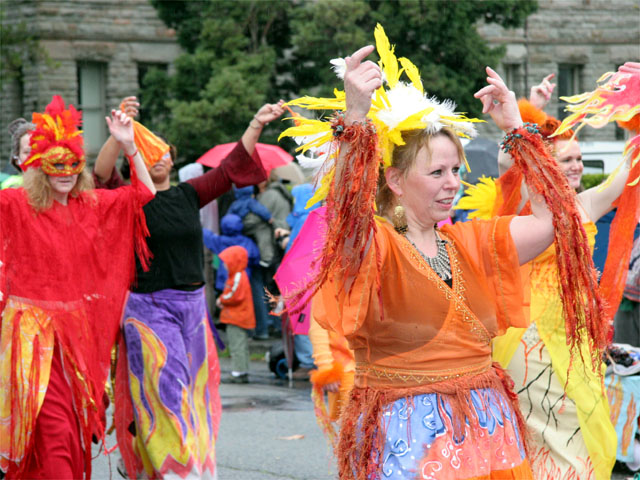
Dancers
