= 35th Tony Awards =

1981 US theatrical awards ceremony

- Date: June 7, 1981
- Location: Mark Hellinger Theatre, New York City, New York
- Hosted by: Ellen Burstyn and Richard Chamberlain
- Most wins: Amadeus (5)
- Most nominations: 42nd Street and Sophisticated Ladies (8)

Television/radio coverage
- Network: CBS

The 35th Annual Tony Awards was broadcast by CBS television on June 7, 1981, from the Mark Hellinger Theatre. The hosts were Ellen Burstyn and Richard Chamberlain. The theme was "Women's Achievements in the Theatre."

== Eligibility ==
Shows that opened on Broadway during the 1980–1981 season before May 14, 1981 are eligible.

Original plays

- Amadeus
- The American Clock
- The Beautiful Mariposa
- Billy Bishop Goes to War
- Division Street
- Fifth of July
- The Floating Light Bulb
- Fools
- Frankenstein
- Heartland
- Inacent Black
- It Had to Be You
- I Won't Dance
- A Lesson from Aloes
- A Life
- Lolita
- Louie and the Elephant
- Lunch Hour
- Mixed Couples
- Of the Fields, Lately
- Passionate Ladies
- Passione
- Piaf
- Quick Change
- Rose
- Sort of an Adventure
- The Suicide
- The Survivor
- To Grandmother's House We Go
- Tricks of the Trade

Original musicals

- Banjo Dancing
- Bring Back Birdie
- Broadway Follies
- Charlie and Algernon
- Copperfield
- Fearless Frank
- 42nd Street
- It's So Nice to Be Civilized
- Lena Horne: The Lady and Her Music
- The Moony Shapiro Songbook
- One Night Stand
- Onward Victoria
- Perfectly Frank
- A Reel American Hero
- Shakespeare's Cabaret
- Sophisticated Ladies
- Tintypes
- Woman of the Year

Play revivals

- The Bacchae
- Emlyn Williams as Charles Dickens
- The Father
- John Gabriel Borkman
- The Little Foxes
- Macbeth
- The Man Who Came to Dinner
- The Philadelphia Story

Musical revivals

- Brigadoon
- Camelot
- Can-Can
- The Five O'Clock Girl
- The Music Man
- The Pirates of Penzance

== The ceremony ==
Presenters: Jane Alexander, Lucie Arnaz, Beatrice Arthur, Lauren Bacall, Zoe Caldwell, Diahann Carroll, Nell Carter, Colleen Dewhurst, José Ferrer, Phyllis Frelich, Julie Harris, Helen Hayes, Celeste Holm, Lena Horne, Judith Jamison, Marjorie Bradley Kellogg, Angela Lansbury, Jane Lapotaire, Michael Learned, Priscilla Lopez, Patti LuPone, Andrea McArdle, Carolyn Mignini, Ann Miller, Tharon Musser, Patricia Neal, Carole Bayer Sager, Ntozake Shange, Meryl Streep, Elizabeth Taylor, Lynne Thigpen, Mary Catherine Wright, Patricia Zipprodt.

Performers: Richard Chamberlain, José Ferrer, Robert Goulet, Robert Klein, Jack Klugman, Peter Nero, Tony Randall, Christopher Reeve, Jason Robards, Tony Roberts, Richard Thomas, Ben Vereen, Billy Dee Williams.

Musicals represented:

- A Chorus Line ("What I Did For Love" - Priscilla Lopez)
- Ain't Misbehavin' ("Honeysuckle Rose" - Nell Carter)
- Annie ("Tomorrow" - Andrea McArdle)
- Evita ("Buenos Aires" - Patti LuPone)
- 42nd Street ("Lullaby of Broadway" - Jerry Orbach and Company)
- Lena Horne: The Lady and Her Music ("If You Believe" - Lena Horne)
- Piaf ("La Vie en Rose" - Jane Lapotaire)
- Sophisticated Ladies ("Rockin' in Rhythm" - Company)
- Sweeney Todd: The Demon Barber of Fleet Street ("By The Sea" - Angela Lansbury)
- Tintypes ("It's Delightful to be Married"/"Fifty-Fifty" - Company)
- Woman of the Year ("One of the Boys" - Lauren Bacall and Men)

== Winners and nominees ==
Winners are in bold

Best Play	Best Musical
**Amadeus – Peter Shaffer**; A Lesson from Aloes – Athol Fugard; A Life – Hugh Leonard; Fifth of July – Lanford Wilson	**42nd Street**; Sophisticated Ladies; Tintypes; Woman of the Year
Best Revival	Best Book of a Musical
**The Pirates of Penzance**; Brigadoon; Camelot; The Little Foxes	**Peter Stone – Woman of the Year**; Michael Stewart and Mark Bramble – 42nd Street; Monty Norman and Julian More – The Moony Shapiro Songbook; Mary Kyte – Tintypes
Best Performance by a Leading Actor in a Play	Best Performance by a Leading Actress in a Play
**Ian McKellen – Amadeus as Antonio Salieri**; Tim Curry – Amadeus as Wolfgang Amadeus Mozart; Roy Dotrice – A Life as Drumm; Jack Weston – The Floating Light Bulb as Jerry Wexler	**Jane Lapotaire – Piaf as Edith Piaf**; Glenda Jackson – Rose as Rose; Eva Le Gallienne – To Grandmother's House We Go as Grandie; Elizabeth Taylor – The Little Foxes as Regina Giddens
Best Performance by a Leading Actor in a Musical	Best Performance by a Leading Actress in a Musical
**Kevin Kline – The Pirates of Penzance as The Pirate King**; Gregory Hines – Sophisticated Ladies as Performer; George Rose – The Pirates of Penzance as Major-General; Martin Vidnovic – Brigadoon as Tommy Albright	**Lauren Bacall – Woman of the Year as Tess Harding**; Meg Bussert – Brigadoon as Fiona MacLaren; Chita Rivera – Bring Back Birdie as Rosie Alvarez; Linda Ronstadt – The Pirates of Penzance as Mabel
Best Performance by a Featured Actor in a Play	Best Performance by a Featured Actress in a Play
**Brian Backer – The Floating Light Bulb as Paul Pollack**; Tom Aldredge – The Little Foxes as Horace Giddens; Adam Redfield – A Life as Desmond; Shepperd Strudwick – To Grandmother's House We Go as Jared	**Swoosie Kurtz – Fifth of July as Gwen Landis**; Maureen Stapleton – The Little Foxes as Birdie Hubbard; Jessica Tandy – Rose as Mother; Zoë Wanamaker – Piaf as Toine
Best Performance by a Featured Actor in a Musical	Best Performance by a Featured Actress in a Musical
**Hinton Battle – Sophisticated Ladies as Various Characters**; Tony Azito – The Pirates of Penzance as Sergeant of Police; Lee Roy Reams – 42nd Street as Billy Lawlor; Paxton Whitehead – Camelot as King Pellinore	**Marilyn Cooper – Woman of the Year as Jan Donovan**; Phyllis Hyman – Sophisticated Ladies as Various Characters; Wanda Richert – 42nd Street as Peggy Sawyer; Lynne Thigpen – Tintypes as Sussanah
Best Original Score (Music and/or Lyrics) Written for the Theatre	Best Choreography
**Woman of the Year – John Kander (music) and Fred Ebb (lyrics)**; Charlie and Algernon – Charles Strouse (music) and David Rogers (lyrics); Copperfield – Al Kasha and Joel Hirschhorn (music and lyrics); Shakespeare's Cabaret – Lance Mulcahy (music)	**Gower Champion – 42nd Street**; Graciela Daniele – The Pirates of Penzance; Henry LeTang, Donald McKayle, and Michael Smuin – Sophisticated Ladies; Roland Petit – Can-Can
Best Direction of a Play	Best Direction of a Musical
**Peter Hall – Amadeus**; Peter Coe – A Life; Marshall W. Mason – Fifth of July; Austin Pendleton – The Little Foxes	**Wilford Leach – The Pirates of Penzance**; Gower Champion – 42nd Street; Robert Moore – Woman of the Year; Michael Smuin – Sophisticated Ladies
Best Scenic Design	Best Costume Design
**John Bury – Amadeus**; John Lee Beatty – Fifth of July; Santo Loquasto – The Suicide; David Mitchell – Can-Can	**Willa Kim – Sophisticated Ladies**; Theoni V. Aldredge – 42nd Street; John Bury – Amadeus; Franca Squarciapino – Can-Can
Best Lighting Design
**John Bury – Amadeus**; Tharon Musser – 42nd Street; Dennis Parichy – Fifth of July; Jennifer Tipton – Sophisticated Ladies

== Special awards ==
- Lena Horne for Lena Horne: The Lady and Her Music
- Regional Theatre Award: Trinity Square Repertory Company, Providence, Rhode Island

=== Multiple nominations and awards ===
These productions had multiple nominations:

- 8 nominations: 42nd Street and Sophisticated Ladies
- 7 nominations: Amadeus and The Pirates of Penzance
- 6 nominations: Woman of the Year
- 5 nominations: Fifth of July and The Little Foxes
- 4 nominations: A Life
- 3 nominations: Brigadoon, Can-Can and Tintypes
- 2 nominations: Camelot, The Floating Light Bulb, Piaf, Rose and To Grandmother's House We Go

The following productions received multiple awards.

- 5 wins: Amadeus
- 4 wins: Woman of the Year
- 3 wins: The Pirates of Penzance
- 2 wins: 42nd Street and Sophisticated Ladies

== See also ==
- Drama Desk Awards
- 1981 Laurence Olivier Awards – equivalent awards for West End theatre productions
- Obie Award
- New York Drama Critics' Circle
- Theatre World Award
- Lucille Lortel Awards
