= Circle Repertory Company =

Defunct theater company in New York City

The Circle Repertory Company, originally named the Circle Theater Company, was a theatre company in New York City that ran from 1969 to 1996. It was founded on July 14, 1969, in Manhattan, in a second floor loft at Broadway and 83rd Street by director Marshall W. Mason, playwright Lanford Wilson, director Rob Thirkield, and actress Tanya Berezin, all of whom were veterans of the Caffe Cino. The plan was to establish a pool of artists — actors, directors, playwrights and designers — who would work together in the creation of plays. In 1974, The New York Times critic Mel Gussow acclaimed Circle Rep as the "chief provider of new American plays."

Marshall W. Mason was succeeded as Artistic Director (1969–1987) by co-founder Tanya Berezin (1987–1995). In 1995, Austin Pendleton succeeded her, with actress Lynn Thigpen as associate artistic director and Milan Stitt as executive director.

Originating in the 1960s, a time when many experimental theaters arose, this company outlasted many others. The Company moved their home to the Sheridan Square Playhouse at 99 Seventh Avenue South in the early 1970s and performed there through 1994. (In the early 1980s the name Sheridan Square Playhouse was dropped in favor of Circle Repertory Theatre.) The company closed its doors in 1996 after 27 years.

== Writers ==
Circle Repertory Company, also called Circle Rep, became home to some of the most prolific talent in the American theater. Co-founder and resident playwright, Lanford Wilson, wrote The Hot L Baltimore (1972-1973 season), The Mound Builders (1974-1975 season), Serenading Louie (1975–76 season), Fifth of July (1977-1978 season), Talley's Folly (1979-1980 season), A Tale Told (1980-1981 season, later revised as Talley & Son), Angels Fall (1982–83 season), Burn This (1986–87 season), and Redwood Curtain (1992–93 season) for the company.

The list of playwrights who also worked at Circle Rep includes Jon Robin Baitz, John Bishop, Julie Bovasso, Michael Cristofer, Keith Curran, William Missouri Downs, Charles Evered, Jules Feiffer, Herb Gardner, A.R. Gurney, Peter Hedges, William M. Hoffman, Albert Innaurato, Corinne Jacker, Arthur Kopit, Jim Leonard, Jr., Roy London, Craig Lucas, David Mamet, Timothy Mason, William Mastrosimone, Mark Medoff, Patrick Meyers, Marsha Norman, Robert Patrick, Joe Pintauro, Murray Schisgal, Sam Shepard, Milan Stitt, Paula Vogel, Tennessee Williams and Paul Zindel.

== Productions ==
Circle Repertory Company was the launching pad of acclaimed productions such as Mark Medoff's When You Comin' Back, Red Ryder? (1973–74), Edward J. Moore's The Sea Horse (1973–74), Tennessee Williams' Battle of Angels (1974), Jules Feiffer's Knock Knock (1975–76), Albert Innaurato's Gemini (1976–77), Sam Shepard's Fool for Love (1982–83), William M. Hoffman's As Is (1984–85), Lanford Wilson's Burn This (1986–87), John Bishop's The Musical Comedy Murders of 1940 (1986–87), Craig Lucas's Reckless (1990) and Prelude to a Kiss (1989–90), William Mastrosimone's Sunshine (1989), Jon Robin Baitz's Three Hotels (1992–93), Larry Kramer'sThe Destiny of Me (1992–93), and Terrence McNally's It's Only a Play (1981).

== Awards ==
Circle Rep plays received numerous awards including the Pulitzer Prize, Tony Awards, New York Drama Critics' Circle Awards, Obie Awards, Drama Desk Awards, and the company was honored with AT & T On Stage Award, the Award for Outstanding Achievement Off-Broadway from the Lucille Lortel Awards, and the Pride Agenda's Artistic Vision Award, and more.

== Actors ==
A distinguished group of actors developed from Circle Repertory Company. The list of actors who called Circle Rep home includes Kathy Bates, Timothy Busfield, Bobby Cannavale, Lindsay Crouse, Jeff Daniels, John Dossett, Brad Dourif, Lisa Emery, Conchata Ferrell, Mari Gorman, Jonathan Hadary, Trish Hawkins, Judd Hirsch, Jonathan Hogan, Barnard Hughes, William Hurt, Judith Ivey, Cherry Jones, Swoosie Kurtz, Zane Lasky, Lou Liberatore, Joe Mantello, Debra Monk, David Morse, Cynthia Nixon, Lisa Pelikan, Tonya Pinkins, Christopher Reeve, Tony Roberts, Daphne Rubin-Vega, Sharon Sharth, Ben Siegler, Helen Stenborg, Danton Stone, Beatrice Straight, Richard Thomas, Fritz Weaver, and Patricia Wettig.

Other Circle Rep alumni include Joan Allen, Alec Baldwin, Dan Bonnell, Kelly Connell, Olympia Dukakis, William Fichtner, Laurence Fishburne, Scott Glenn, Farley Granger, Ed Harris, Melissa Joan Hart, Heavy D, Timothy Hutton, Piper Laurie, Christine Lahti, Jennifer Jason Leigh, John Malkovich, Demi Moore, Mary-Louise Parker, and Gary Sinise.

Other company and Circle LAB actors included David Arrow, Michael Ayr, Steve Bassett, Tanya Berezin, Craig Bockhorn, Maggie Burke, Marylouise Burke, Paul Butler, Lynn Cohen, Katherine Cortez, Cyndi Coyne, Cathryn Damon, Jack Davidson, Danielle Delgado, Jake Dengel, Anthony DiMaria, Pamela Dunlap, Claris Erickson, Neil Flanagan, Mary Lea Floden, Lindsey Ginter, Stephanie Gordon, Steve Gregan, Charles T. Harper, Michael Higgins, Ruby Holbrook, Jonathan Hogan, Laura Hughes, Ken Kliban, Zane Lasky, Bobo Lewis, Lou Liberatore, Robert LuPone, Sharon Madden, Jeff McCracken, Edward J. Moore, Jordan Mott, Bruce McCarty, Randy Noojin, Monica Parks, Burke Pearson, Michael Warren Powell, Scott Rymer, Sharon Schlarth, Richard Seff, Timothy Shelton, Ben Siegler, Nancy Snyder, June Stein, Ife Oshun, Brian Tarantina, Rob Thirkield, and Jimmie Ray Weeks, among others.

== Company members ==
Company designers were John Lee Beatty and David Potts for sets, Dennis Parichy and Malcolm Sturchio for lights, Jennifer von Mayrhauser and Laura Crow for costumes, Chuck London and Stuart Warner for sound. Company composers have been Norman L. Berman, Jonathan Brielle, and Peter Kater. Company stage managers were Fred Reinglas, MA Howard and Denise Yaney. Production Managers included Earl Hughes, Jody Boese, Kate Stewart and Karen Potosnak.

== Program ==
In 1979 Circle Rep returned to their original concept of rotating rep, producing two plays in repertory; Hamlet, and Schiller's Mary Stuart. By 1982 Circle Rep had outgrown its theater and began to present some works on other stages. Running parallel to the classics, Circle Rep became celebrated for its productions of new plays, particularly those in the style that has been labeled "lyric realism," with Lanford Wilson being the leading voice of the genre. Marshall W. Mason directed dozens of Wilson's plays starting with Balm in Gilead in 1965, Home Free! and The Madness of Lady Bright in London (1968) and continuing at Circle Rep with Sextet (Yes) in 1971.

== Projects ==
In addition to major productions Circle Rep ran a Projects-in-Progress series called Circle Rep Lab. The Lab's Artistic Director was first Daniel Irvine, then Michael Warren Powell. At its height the Lab had over 300 active members (actors, writers directors and designers). Plays selected for this series received a week of rehearsal and a four-performance run. Several of these plays went on to become major productions the following season or at other theaters, and include such original stagings as Marsha Norman's 'Night, Mother, Bill C. Davis' Mass Appeal, and William M. Hoffman's As IS. [1]

The literary office, headed by B. Rodney Marriott and followed by Milan Stitt, was one of the few that read unsolicited scripts and plays and responded with detailed criticism. To the end of developing scripts and plays, the company ran two reading series, Friday Readings and Extended Readings.

The company collaborated with the Dramatists Guild on a series called Young Playwrights Festival, founded by Stephen Sondheim and Gerald Chapman in 1981. For the festival, ten plays with writers ranging from 8 to 18 were chosen for full production or staged readings. Plays were produced at Circle Rep with professional actors. Among the playwrights were Kenneth Lonergan and Jonathan Marc Sherman.

Michael Warren Powell became the artistic director of a successor company, Circle East, which continued the work of the LAB until Powell's death in 2016.
