= Norman L. Berman =

American composer

Norman L. Berman is an American theater composer and playwright.

== Career as composer ==
Norman L. Berman served as composer-in-Residence at the celebrated Circle Repertory Company. He composed music scores for over 20 plays there ranging from premieres by Tennessee Williams, Lanford Wilson, Marsha Norman and Paul Zindel to Shakespearean and Chekhovian classics. At Circle Repertory Company he worked with various distinguished directors and actors including Marshall W. Mason, Lanford Wilson, William Hurt, Christopher Reeve, Judd Hirsch and Jeff Daniels.

Berman co-composed the score to the Broadway and off-Broadway productions of the 1979 musical play Strider. For the Broadway production, he was the first composer to be awarded the Drama Desk Award in the category of outstanding music in a play. He also served as orchestrator and musical director. Strider has subsequently been produced all over the world including regional theaters across the United States.

He received an Ace Award nomination for his score for the film Traveler's Rest, seen on Showtime Cable Network. Berman's other television scores have been heard on PBS, CBS Cable Television, (Kennedy's Children) and the Discovery Channel. He has also composed music for four mini-musicals with librettist, lyricist Abraham Tetenbaum for the educational touring shows produced by Enrichment Works.

For ten years Berman served as Composer-in-Residence for the classical repertory company, A Noise Within, where he composed scores for some 32 plays ranging from Shakespeare to Thornton Wilder.

== Commissions ==
Berman has been commissioned to compose music for many prominent regional theaters across the country including, New York Shakespeare Festival, Manhattan Theatre Club, Playwrights Horizons, Brooklyn Academy of Music, New York Theatre Workshop, Roundabout Theatre, Arena Stage, Folger Theater Company, St. Louis Repertory Company, GeVa Theater, Seattle Repertory Company, Williamstown Theatre Festival, Taper Two and many more. His score for the musical "Winter Shakers" was premiered by the Louisville Symphony Orchestra at the inaugural ceremonies at the Kentucky Center For The Performing Arts.

== Career as director ==
Berman was commissioned by the Chelsea Theatre Center, to create (with Betty Comden and Adolph Green) and co-direct By Bernstein, a musical revue premiering Leonard Bernstein's unheard songs from West Side Story, Candide, On The Town, Peter Pan and The Race to Urga.

For Manhattan Theatre Club, he conceived and directed the musical revue An Evening of Cole Porter, which premiered two dozen songs by Cole Porter. A new and improved version was subsequently produced by Circle Repertory Company as "Unsung Cole." It was lauded by the press and has been produced by many regional theaters across the country. It is published by Samuel French.

Berman directed various stage productions for Manhattan Theatre Club, Milwaukee Repertory Theatre, Westchester Theatre Company and more. He created and directed the revue Patch, Patch, Patch, which premiered the songs of Alan Menken at the Laurie Beechman Theatre in New York City.
