= Ludlow Fair =

One-act play by Lanford Wilson

- Written by: Lanford Wilson
- Characters: Rachel, Agnes
- Original language: English
- Genre: One-act play

Premiere
- Date premiered: February 1, 1965
- Place premiered: New York City

Ludlow Fair is a one-act play by American playwright Lanford Wilson. It was first produced at Caffe Cino in 1965, a coffeehouse and theatre founded by Joe Cino, a pioneer of the Off-Off-Broadway theatre movement.

== Production history ==
The play was originally supposed to premiere as a double bill with Adrienne Kennedy's The Owl Answers, with both plays directed by Michael Kahn. Kahn and Lucille Lortel asked Wilson to remove a four-letter word from his play, which he agreed to. When Lortel wrote to Wilson's agent, she also asked him to change the term "pissed off", then further stated, "Throughout I feel there are entirely too many 'Christs.' I feel it is possible to make a true and telling point without undue vulgarity, as Miss Kennedy's play proves." Wilson did not agree to these changes.

The play premiered at the Caffe Cino in February 1965. It was directed and designed by Neil Flanagan, with lighting design by Dennis Parichy. The cast featured Martha Galphin (Rachel) and Jennie Ventriss (Agnes). It then premiered off-Broadway, in a double bill with The Madness of Lady Bright, at Theater East. The double bill opened on March 22 and closed on April 3, 1966. It was directed by William Hunt, with set and lighting design by David F. Segal and costume design by Kapi Reith. The off-Broadway cast featured Sasha von Scherler (Agnes) and Ann Wedgeworth (Rachel).

In the spring of 1967, a Lanford Wilson festival was produced for the tenth anniversary of the Caffe Cino. The cast featured Brandy Carson and Sandy Lessin. In the 1970s, Conchata Ferrell was acting at Circle Repertory Company and wanted to do a revival of Ludlow Fair. Trish Hawkins was cast opposite Ferrell, and after Wilson saw this production, he cast both actresses in The Hot l Baltimore (1973).

In 1976, Ludlow Fair was triple billed with The Madness of Lady Bright and The Family Continues at the NYTE Arena Theatre in New York City, directed by Pam Billig. In 1980, it was quadruple billed at the Manhattan Conservatory Theater as Summer, Sex, and Sanity. The four plays included were Ernest Thompson's A Good Time, Tennessee Williams' This Property is Condemned, Arthur Kopit's Chamber Music, and Ludlow Fair. Ludlow Fair was double billed with Terence Rattigan's All On Her Own, featuring Alicia Springer, Jo Damiano, and Marina Cross, at the No Smoking Playhouse in 1982.

Cesear's Forum, Cleveland's minimalist theatre company, presented a 2024 revival of the original Wilson double bill entitled Ludlow Fair & The Madness of Lady Bright, at Kennedy's Down Under, Playhouse Square. The cast of four included: Graceyn Cecilia Dowd (Rachel) and double cast in the latter (Girl), Katie Wells (Agnes), featuring Matthew Wright (Leslie "Lady" Bright) and Daniel Telford (Boy). It was co-directed by Greg Cesear and Tricia Bestic. Cleveland Scene's Christine Howey wrote: "Two plays, entirely different, and entirely captivating experiences; each about an hour long and each possessing highly individual storytelling dynamics."

== Plot summary ==
The Village Voice describes the play as:

"... a bedtime story about two girl roommates. Rachael is glamorous, fast-living, sometimes lost in her own self-dramatizations; Agnes is plain, matter-of-fact, her shyness masked by a kooky personality. The play is ostensibly about Rachael: She turned her latest boyfriend in to the police when he stole from her, and now she is remorseful—now she decides she is in love with him. Agnes tries to cheer her up with wisecracks, then tries to rekindle her self-awareness, and finally Rachael goes to sleep. Agnes is left alone, thinking about her lunch date with the boss' disappointing son tomorrow. And suddenly it is her play, the realist is the true romantic. Agnes' unprepossessing but real emotions outweigh Rachel's trumped-up, self-indulgent flourishes, and suddenly the play is simple and moving."
