= Angels Fall =

Play written by Lanford Wilson

Angels Fall is a play by Lanford Wilson. It premiered off-Broadway at the Circle Repertory Company in 1982. The play ran on Broadway in 1983 and was nominated for the Tony Award for Best Play.

== Characters ==
- Niles Harris: a cynical, middle-aged university professor
- Vita Harris: his much younger wife
- Don Tabaha: a young Native American medical student
- Marion Clay: a wealthy, middle-aged widow
- Salvatore Zappala: Marion's young lover
- Father William Doherty: an elderly, idealistic Catholic priest

Niles and Vita were originally called Niles and Vita Heron, but Wilson changed their names when it was pointed out that "Vita Heron" sounded like Vita Herring, a brand of herring.

== Plot summary ==
A nuclear accident has occurred in a remote section of New Mexico, and two couples who had been traveling through the area are forced to stop and seek shelter while awaiting further word from the authorities. They find shelter at a small Catholic mission ministering to impoverished local Native Americans.

The first couple consists of a middle-aged professor and his attractive young wife. He is being taken to a sanitarium near Phoenix after a recent nervous breakdown. The professor has become disillusioned with academia, and now likes to rant that education itself is an evil. The second couple are a wealthy middle-aged widow and her much younger lover, an aspiring tennis pro. He initially appears to be merely a toy, but it gradually becomes clear that she loves him deeply and is terrified of losing him.

While at the mission, the couples encounter Father Doherty, an elderly priest who runs the mission. Doherty relies heavily on his foster son, Don Tabaha, a young Native American. Doherty wants desperately for Tabaha to stay in New Mexico and continue working at the mission, but Tabaha wants nothing more than to get away and leave the poverty of New Mexico.

All characters' future plans are put on hold, while they wait to learn whether the nuclear accident can be resolved. If the problem is fixed, they must all make difficult decisions and move on with their lives. If not, they may all die there at the mission.

== Production history ==
Angels Fall premiered Off-Broadway at the Circle Repertory Theatre on October 17, 1982 and closed on November 28, 1982. Directed by Marshall W. Mason, the production featured Barnard Hughes as Father William Doherty and Fritz Weaver as Niles Harris. The role of Father Doherty was written for Barnard Hughes.

The play premiered on Broadway at the Longacre Theatre on January 18, 1983 for previews, officially on January 22, and closed on March 13, 1983 after 57 performances. Directed by Marshall W. Mason, scenic design was by John Lee Beatty with costumes by Jennifer von Mayrhauser, lighting by Dennis Parichy, sound by Chuck London, and original music by Norman L. Berman. The cast featured Weaver as Niles Harris, Nancy Snyder as Vita Harris, Danton Stone as Don Tabaha, Tanya Berezin as Marion Clay, Brian Tarantina as Salvatore Zappala, and Hughes as Father William Doherty.

This play was commissioned and initially presented by the New World Festival Inc. in Miami, Florida on June 19, 1982, with Richard Seff as Father Doherty.

== Critical response ==
Reviewing the play from Miami for The Boston Phoenix, Carolyn Clay remarked that the play "has two pretty good acts, five credible but highly theatrical characters (and one wife), and a striking central strategy: its inhabitants must choose how to live their lives in the shadow of the apocalypse — here represented by a nuclear-related accident just around the corner. What the play could use, and at this point won't get, is a new premise. The one it has is, alas, a little the worse for wear: disparate characters are stalled together at the crossroads of life where, tense and on edge, they beep at one another until someone spills his guts all over the intersection. Given that he chose to trap himself in such a formula, Wilson decorates the walls with aplomb."

The reviewer for The Christian Science Monitor wrote: "Traditional in form, the play involves a contemporary phenomenon: the incidental threats posed by a nuclear age. But it is primarily about individual responsibility, vocation, and personal fulfillment ... Although Mr. Wilson's partial resolution of the central conflict seems rather too pat and predictable, the manner in which his characters reveal themselves to one another and the audience is theatrically engaging. Under Mr. Mason's sensitive guidance, the Circle Rep cast responds with winning conviction to the play's comic as well as its more touching moments, to the frequently sharp exchanges, and to the passages of Wilsonian eloquence."

== Awards and nominations ==
=== Original Broadway production ===
| Year | Award | Category | Nominee | Result |
|---|---|---|---|---|
| 1983 | Tony Award | Best Play | | Nominated |
| 1983 | Tony Award | Best Direction of a Play | Marshall W. Mason | Nominated |
| 1983 | Theatre World Award | | Brian Tarantina | Won |
