= Serenading Louie =

1976 play by Lanford Wilson

- Written by: Lanford Wilson
- Characters: Mary; Gabrielle; Carl; Alex
- Original language: English
- Genre: Drama

Premiere
- Date premiered: 1970

Serenading Louie is a 1976 play by Lanford Wilson.

== Production history ==
The 1976 Off-Broadway production of Serenading Louie played at the Circle Repertory Company from May 2 to May 30, 1976. Marshall W. Mason won an Obie Award for his direction. The cast included Tanya Berezin as Mary, Trish Hawkins as Gabrielle, Edward J. Moore as Carl, and Michael Storm as Alex. The production was designed by John Lee Beatty, with costumes by Jennifer von Mayrhauser and lighting by Dennis Parichy.

In 1984, a production was staged at The Public Theater, opening January 17, 1984. The cast included Lindsay Crouse, Jimmie Ray Weeks, Peter Weller, and Dianne Wiest, who won an Obie Award for her performance. The production was directed by John Tillinger, with lighting design by Richard Nelson.

A revival was staged at London's Donmar Warehouse in 2010, running from February 11 until March 27. The production then toured to Salford, Leicester, and Truro. The cast included Jason Butler Harner as Alex, Jason O'Mara as Carl, Charlotte Emmerson as Gabrielle, and Geraldine Somerville as Mary. The production was directed by Simon Curtis, with design by Peter McKintosh.

== Plot summary ==
The story involves two couples, appearing to live well in identical houses in the suburbs. However, neither couple is happy in their marriage. An affair is being carried on secretly within this foursome, leading to a very violent conclusion.

== Critical reception ==
In her review in The Guardian, Lyn Gardner stated, "This is the stuff of boulevard drama, and dressing it up with Ayckbourn-style tricks of two couples in one space, or theatrical asides, doesn't make it any more interesting". She later added that "the failure of the words to explode even during the final melodramatic moments is symptomatic of this play's ashen emptiness."
