= The Goodbye People (film) =

- Theatrical release poster
- Directed by: Herb Gardner
- Screenplay by: Herb Gardner
- Based on: The Goodbye People by Herb Gardner
- Produced by: Mel Howard; David V. Picker
- Starring: Judd Hirsch; Martin Balsam; Pamela Reed; Vincent Gugleotti; Gene Saks; Ron Silver
- Cinematography: John Lindley
- Edited by: Rick Shaine
- Production companies: Coney Island Productions; Embassy Pictures
- Distributed by: Castle Hill Productions
- Release dates: May 1984 (Cannes Film Festival); 1984 (Toronto); January 31, 1986 (New York)
- Running time: 104 minutes
- Country: United States
- Language: English
- Budget: $2.5 million

The Goodbye People is a 1984 American comedy-drama film written and directed by Herb Gardner, based on his 1968 play The Goodbye People. The film stars Judd Hirsch, Martin Balsam, Pamela Reed, Vincent Gugleotti, Gene Saks and Ron Silver. First screened at the 1984 Cannes Film Festival, it wasn't released in the United States until 1986.

== Plot ==
Arthur Korman is a 40-year old man stuck in a job he hates and visits Coney Island every morning to view the sunrise. There he meets Max Silverman, the former owner of a hot dog stand at the beach, and his daughter Shirley, who dreams of re-opening the stand since his heart attack.

== Cast ==
- Judd Hirsch as Arthur Korman
- Martin Balsam as Max Silverman
- Pamela Reed as Nancie (Shirley) Scot
- Vincent Gugleotti as Irwin Abrams
- Gene Saks as Marcus Soloway
- Ron Silver as Eddie Bergson
- Sammy Smith as George Mooney
- James Trotman as Velasquez
- Michael Tucker as Michael Silverman
- Sid Winter as The Jogger

== Production ==
The film was originally planned in 1969 by United Artists with David V. Picker and Norman Lear producing. After the administration at United Artists changed, the film was picked up by Embassy Pictures. Bob Fosse considered making the film in 1974.

Hirsch, Balsam, Picker and Gardner all worked for scale to keep the budget down to $2.5 million. Filming took place over 8 weeks in Coney Island in April and May 1983, with the weather in April being the very bad.

== Release ==
The film was screened at the 1984 Cannes Film Festival and at the Toronto International Film Festival and opened for one week in Toronto during 1984.

The film was due to be released in New York in 1984 but was delayed due to an extended run of The Gods Must Be Crazy. Following the sale of Embassy Pictures to the Coca-Cola Company in 1985 and then to Dino de Laurentiis, the worldwide theatrical rights were sold to Lear.

Lear financed a release in New York and Los Angeles, with the film opening in New York on January 31, 1986 and in Los Angeles on February 14. It was distributed through Castle Hill Productions with Castle Hill handling the rest of the release dates for a return of the gross after Lear had recouped his marketing costs.

The film was due to be released on home video in the first quarter of 1986 by Embassy Home Communications but the release was delayed to enable the theatrical release to take place.

== Critical reception ==
Leonard Klady at Variety wrote: "Based on his 15-year old stage flop of the same name, neither time nor the transferal of media has improved the story of three eccentric losers who band together in hopes of changing their luck... The uneasy alliance between the characters is treated in a glib fashion by Gardner. The dialog is superficial, laced with presumably comic barbs. However, underlying it all is an illsuited strain of sentimentality." The reviewer for People wrote: "The three make a wonderfully human trio, playing off and to each other's eccentricities with warmth and humor. First-time director Herb Gardner, who also wrote the play of the same name, proves equally adept behind the pen and the camera... the movie, shot on location, offers a beautifully nostalgic portrait of Coney Island, the skeletons of its once-monumental attractions creating a dual sense of foreboding and serenity. 'The Goodbye People' meets these contradictions head-on, turning a story of life and death into a witty celebration of spirit."
