= Talley & Son =

Play written by Lanford Wilson

- Cover of the paperback edition published by Hill and Wang, July 1986
- Original language: English
- Written by: Lanford Wilson
- Series: Talley Family trilogy
- Subject: A father and son battle to control the future of the family business
- Genre: Drama
- Setting: Lebanon, Missouri; July 4, 1944

Premiere
- Date: September 24, 1985
- Place: Circle Repertory Theater; New York City

Talley & Son is a play by Lanford Wilson, the third in his trilogy focusing on the Talley family of Lebanon, Missouri. It is set on July 4, 1944, the same day as Talley's Folly and thirty-three years prior to the events in Fifth of July.

== Background ==
The play originally was produced off-Broadway as A Tale Told in June 1981. Directed by Marshall W. Mason, the cast starred Patricia Wettig, Helen Stenborg, Michael Higgins (Eldon), Fritz Weaver (Mr. Talley), and Trish Hawkins (Sally).

Wilson was unhappy with the work and revised it substantially over the next four years. In Talley & Son, the dysfunctional family is debating the murky future of the family-owned businesses, a local bank and textile factory that seem destined to be absorbed by a conglomerate once World War II ends. Eldon Talley took control of the enterprises when his favored, elder brother died young, and although he has been successful, his miserly, bigoted father Calvin, who is expected to die at any moment, despises him and his efforts to defy his authority. Other characters include Eldon's spinster sister Lottie, a cynical rebel dying of industrial radium poisoning; his complacent wife Netta; their daughter Sally, who is dating a Jewish accountant; and Avalaine Platt, a mysterious visitor who claims she is Eldon's illegitimate daughter. Quietly observing the scene is the spirit of Timmy, Eldon and Netta's son, who has just been killed in battle in the South Pacific and has returned home a few hours before his parents receive the telegram announcing his death.

== Production ==
The play opened Off-Broadway (as Talley & Son) at the Circle Repertory Theater on September 24, 1985 and ran for 42 performances. Directed by Marshall W. Mason, the cast included Farley Granger as Eldon, Edward Seamon as Calvin, Joyce Reehling Christopher as Lottie, Helen Stenborg as Netta, Trish Hawkins as Sally, Lisa Emery as Viola, and Robert Macnaughton as Timmy. Both Granger and Stenborg won the 1986 Obie Award, Performance.

== Critical response ==
In his review of Talley & Son in The New York Times, Frank Rich said the play "is, for much of its length, amusing entertainment." He continued, "But if Mr. Wilson has been, on other occasions, a persuasive heir to Tennessee Williams, in this play he remains an unconvincing stand-in for Lillian Hellman," and called Talley & Son "a Little Foxes without bite but with perhaps even more plot." He added, "Still, for all the flaws that remain from A Tale Told, the improvements in Talley & Son are real. What was a dull, superficial play is now a superficial play that clicks smartly along until mid-Act II. In addition to tightening, focusing and clarifying (one need no longer refer constantly to the family tree in the program), Mr. Wilson has added a goodly share of funny lines... Even so, as far as Talley & Son is concerned, the honorable time may have come for Mr. Wilson to give up the ghost."

Rich had reviewed the earlier version, A Tale Told, for The New York Times, writing: "There are a dozen characters in A Tale Told, Lanford Wilson's long-awaited third play about the Talley clan of southern Missouri, but I'm afraid only one of them is worth caring about. I'm equally sorry to report that the single exception, Sally Talley, isn't on stage too long. Sally pops up only in the play's waning moments, when she sneaks into her family's mansion to grab a suitcase and skip town.... The evening's plot, which involves revelations of sordid business and sexual affairs, appears to be Mr. Wilson's playful but illdesigned homage to such old-time melodramas as The Little Foxes, The Magnificent Ambersons and just maybe Peyton Place. "
