= Daniel Seltzer =

American actor and professor (1933–1980)

- Born: February 13, 1933; Passaic, New Jersey, U.S.
- Died: March 1, 1980 (aged 47); New York City, New York, U.S.
- Occupations: Scholar, actor, director

Academic background
- Education: Princeton University (AB); New College, Oxford; Harvard University (PhD)

Academic work
- Discipline: Shakespeare studies
- Institutions: Harvard University; Princeton University

Daniel Seltzer (February 13, 1933 – March 1, 1980) was an American Shakespeare scholar, actor, director, and educator. A specialist in English Renaissance theatre and theatrical performance, he taught for most of his career at Princeton University, where he founded and directed Princeton's Program in Theater and Dance. As an actor, he received a nomination for the Tony Award for Best Featured Actor in a Play for his performance in Jules Feiffer's Knock Knock.

== Early life and education ==
Seltzer was born in Passaic, New Jersey, on February 13, 1933. He graduated summa cum laude from Princeton University in 1954. As an undergraduate he was active in Theatre Intime and emerged as one of the leading figures in Princeton's theatrical community.

Following graduation he studied at New College, Oxford, as a Fulbright Scholar before undertaking graduate work at Harvard University, where he earned his doctorate in English literature.

== Academic career ==
=== Harvard University ===
Seltzer joined the faculty of Harvard University in 1959 after receiving his doctorate. During the following decade he established himself as both a Shakespeare scholar and an active participant in university theater. By 1963 he had gained a reputation as an unusually versatile academic, combining teaching, scholarship, directing, and acting.

In 1965, Seltzer became associate director of Harvard's Loeb Drama Center, a position he held until 1970. He was promoted to full professor in 1967. That same year he introduced Harvard's first course offering academic credit in acting technique, reflecting his conviction that performance should form part of a liberal arts education.

=== Princeton University ===
In 1970. Seltzer returned to Princeton University as professor of English and chairman of the faculty committee overseeing McCarter Theatre. In 1972, he became the first director of Princeton's Program in Theater and Dance, a position he held until 1979.

Under Seltzer's leadership, Princeton expanded opportunities for practical theatrical training within the curriculum. The program introduced academic credit for theatrical production work and developed artist-in-residence programs that brought professional actors, directors, and playwrights into contact with students. During this time, he was featured in the Academy Award–winning documentary Princeton: A Search for Answers. In 1978 Seltzer helped establish the Matthews Acting Studio, which became a center for performance training at Princeton.

Following his death, Princeton provost Neil Rudenstine credited Seltzer with having effectively created the university's modern theater program.

== Scholarship ==
Seltzer specialized in Shakespeare and Renaissance drama, particularly the relationship between dramatic texts and theatrical performance. He published books, scholarly articles, reviews, and critical editions devoted to Shakespeare and Elizabethan theater.

His work emphasized the importance of understanding Shakespeare's plays as works written for performance rather than solely as literary texts. He lectured widely, conducted seminars for teachers sponsored by the National Endowment for the Humanities, and appeared on educational television programs devoted to the humanities.

Seltzer received a Guggenheim Fellowship in 1964.

== Acting career ==
Alongside his academic work, Seltzer maintained an active professional career as an actor and director. His Shakespearean roles included King Lear, Leontes, Falstaff, Iago, Ulysses, Prospero, and Gonzalo. He also performed major roles in modern drama, including Willy Loman in Arthur Miller's Death of a Salesman, Thomas More in Robert Bolt's A Man for All Seasons, and James Tyrone Sr. in Eugene O'Neill's Long Day's Journey into Night.

In 1976, Seltzer received a nomination for the Tony Award for Best Featured Actor in a Play for his performance as Cohn in Jules Feiffer's Knock Knock. He also received a Theatre World Award for the role.

Seltzer appeared in Samuel Beckett's Endgame, portraying Hamm in productions in both Paris and a Manhattan Theatre Club revival in New York. His sole film role was in the 1978 motion picture An Unmarried Woman, starring Jill Clayburgh.

== Death and legacy ==
Seltzer died of a heart attack at Columbia-Presbyterian Medical Center in New York City on March 1, 1980, at the age of 47. At the time of his death he was rehearsing a production of Anton Chekhov's Three Sisters.

He is remembered both for his scholarship on Shakespeare and for his role in transforming theater education at Princeton University. The Program in Theater and Dance that he helped create became a foundation for Princeton's later expansion of the performing arts through the Lewis Center for the Arts.
