= Helen Stenborg =

American actress (1925–2011)

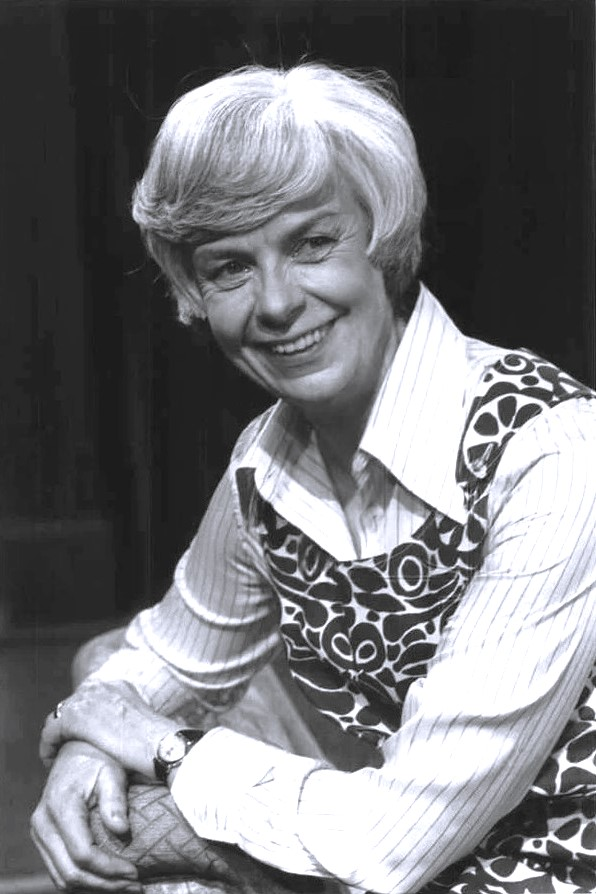
- Born: Helen Joan Stenborg; January 24, 1925; Minneapolis, Minnesota, U.S.
- Died: March 22, 2011 (aged 86); New York City, U.S.
- Occupation: Actress
- Years active: 1947–2008
- Spouse: Barnard Hughes (m. 1950; died 2006)
- Children: 2

Helen Joan Stenborg (January 24, 1925 – March 22, 2011) was an American actress of stage, screen, and television. She occasionally acted with her husband, actor Barnard Hughes, to whom she was married for 56 years, from 1950 until his death in 2006.

== Career ==
Stenborg appeared on stage in revivals of A Doll's House, A Month in the Country, and The Crucible; the original, belated US production of Noël Coward's Waiting in the Wings, for which she was nominated for a Tony Award for Best Featured Actress in a Play; and the Lanford Wilson plays, The Hot l Baltimore, The Rimers of Eldritch and Talley & Son, winning the Obie Award for her performance in the latter.

She portrayed Helga Lindeman on the soap opera Another World from 1977 to 1978. Stenborg also appeared in the 1999 film, My Mother Dreams the Satan's Disciples in New York, which won an Academy Award for Best Short Subject in 2000.

== Personal life and death ==
Stenborg was married to actor Barnard Hughes for 56 years, from 1950 until his death in 2006. They had two children, a son named Doug, who became a theater director, and a daughter named Laura.

Stenborg died on March 22, 2011, aged 86, in New York City.

== Partial filmography ==
- Three Days of the Condor (1975) - Mrs. Edwina Russell
- Another World (1977–1978) - Helga Lindeman
- The Europeans (1979) - Mrs. Acton
- Starting Over (1979) - Older Woman
- The Bonfire of the Vanities (1990) - Mrs. McCoy
- Me and Veronica (1993) - Woman at Laundromat
- Homicide: Life on the Street (1994) - Isabella Kunkle
- Marvin's Room (1996) - Nun on Phone
- My Mother Dreams the Satan's Disciples in New York (1999) - Marian
- Isn't She Great (2000) - Aunt Abigail
- Bless the Child (2000) - Sister Joseph
- Enchanted (2007) - Ballroom Lady #1
- The Caller (2008) - Jimmy's Mother
- Doubt (2008) - Sister Teresa (final film role)
