= Knock Knock (play) =

Knock Knock is a play written by American author, cartoonist and playwright Jules Feiffer. It is a comedy, and was produced on Broadway in 1976, where it earned Tony Award nominations including Best Play. In Feiffer's signature style, he created the artwork for the poster and program, which shows figures peering out from behind a door to answer the knock.

Poster and program cover

== Synopsis ==
In a cabin in the woods, two bickering old Jewish recluses, Abe and Cohn, have retired, and haven't moved in two decades. Abe is a former stockbroker, and Cohn is an unemployed musician. In fact Abe and Cohn represent one character, that has been split into two opposing sides of the same spirit: Cohn is the realist, who believing only in empirical reality, Abe is the romantic. Miraculous events begin to happen. When Cohn wishes for a new roommate, his wish is promptly granted by the arrival of a mad magus named Wiseman. This leads to another visitor who is none other than Joan of Arc, accompanied by her “Voices”. Though her arrival is at first greeted by a shotgun blast, Abe and Cohn are eventually charmed by the saint, and she gets them to re-consider many of their preconceived ideas to such an extent that Abe and Cohn eventually switch positions: Abe becomes the skeptical realist and Cohn becomes the true believer. She calls Abe and Cohn to join her in a space ship on a pilgrimage to Heaven — before the coming holocaust. Cohn is willing to go along, but Abe refuses, so Joan remains and sets up housekeeping in the cabin. When Joan accidentally cuts her finger in the kitchen, she faints and dies, which gets her to heaven without the space ship. Abe and Cohn are left behind to argue with Joan’s spiritual Voices.

When Feiffer discussed Knock Knock, he considered that aspects of it can be a metaphor for the post-1960s era America. “In the ‘60s there was an eruption of first rate social, political, cultural criticism that the country desperately needed.” He said, “The assumption was that all that had to be done was to show the people these things, and the country would change. … The full effect of all this exposure though was that instead of re-educating the country and making it ready for change, it terrified the country and made it withdraw from the idea of change.” When Joan arrives in the play, he added, “she comes in as the life-giving figure to bring hope. Because if those two men don’t change, they will die.”

== Production history ==
Knock Knock was first performed Off-Broadway at the Circle Repertory Company. It opened on February 2, 1976 to positive reviews.

With its success the show moved, production intact, to Broadway where it opened on February 24, 1976 at the Biltmore Theatre. It was directed by Marshall W. Mason. The cast included Neil Flanagan (Abe), Daniel Seltzer (Cohn), Judd Hirsch (Wiseman), and Nancy Snyder (St. Joan). Sets were designed by John Lee Beatty, costumes by Jennifer von Mayrhauser and lights by Dennis Parichy. It marked the Broadway debut for a number of its cast and production crew. The production earned a number of Tony nominations, for the play, the performances, and the production.

Then a curious event occurred. During the Broadway run, well after the opening night, and immediately after the June 1976 Tony Awards show, Broadway producer Harry Rigby decided to re-work what had been a successful and acclaimed production. Rigby brought in a new director, José Quintero, who was better known for serious drama, and some of the roles were recast with Charles Durning (Cohn), John Heffernan (Abe), Leonard Frey (Wiseman) and Lynn Redgrave (St. Joan). This move was not well responded to in the press, and the show ended its run July 3, 1976.
