= The Rimers of Eldritch =

One-act play written by Lanford Wilson

- Original language: English
- Written by: Lanford Wilson
- Characters: Robert Conklin; Eva Jackson; Skelly Mannor; Evelyn Jackson; Nelly Windrod; Mary Windrod; Patsy Johnson; Mavis Johnson; Peck Johnson; Josh Johnson; Lena Truit; Martha Truit; Wilma Atkins; Cora Graves; Walter; Preacher/Judge; Trucker
- Subject: A murder trial in a decaying Missouri town
- Genre: Drama
- Setting: Eldritch, Missouri

Premiere
- Date: July 13, 1966
- Place: La MaMa Experimental Theatre Club; New York City

The Rimers of Eldritch is a play by Lanford Wilson. The play is set in the mid-20th century in Eldritch, Missouri, a decaying Bible Belt town that once was a prosperous coal mining community. The plot focuses on the murder of the aging local hermit, Skelly Mannor, by a woman, Nelly Windrod, who mistakenly thought he was committing rape when he was actually trying to prevent a rape from occurring.

== Production history ==
The play premiered off-off-Broadway at La MaMa Experimental Theatre Club in July 1966, as directed by Wilson. The production as directed by Michael Kahn opened off-Broadway at the Cherry Lane Theatre on February 20, 1967, where it ran for 32 performances. The cast included Dena Dietrich, Don Scardino, Helen Stenborg, Susan Tyrrell, and Bette Henritze, who won the Obie Award for Distinguished Performance.

Wilson adapted his play into a television movie broadcast by PBS as the first episode of its Great Performances series on November 4, 1972. The production was directed by Davey Marlin-Jones, and stars Roberts Blossom, Susan Sarandon, Rue McClanahan, K Callan, Will Hare, Kate Harrington, Frances Sternhagen, and Ernest Thompson.

The play was revived at La MaMa in 1981 for the theater's 20th anniversary celebration. Wilson directed this production.

Mark Brokaw directed a revival at the Second Stage Theatre that opened on November 8, 1988 and ran for 43 performances. The cast included William Mesnik, Adam Storke, and Amy Ryan. Reviewing the production for The New York Times, Mel Gussow cited Wilson's "sensitivity and his gift for language."

== Critical reception ==
Howard Thompson reviewed the television movie for The New York Times. He noted that "as a TV drama, it has a good cast, an astute director in Davey Marlin-Jones, and an authenticity of background.... the action is cluttered with a confusion of bits and pieces and even scenes that jump to the past and the future.... Mr. Marlin-Jones, with the plot edging forward, handles some scenes beautifully as in one gossipy exchange between two uneasy women, Sarah Cummingham and Helen Stenborg."

Reviewing an October 1981 production of the play at the New Ehrlich Theater, Boston Center for the Arts, Carolyn Clay of The Boston Phoenix wrote that "Underneath the oft-false folksiness of small-town life, Wilson opines, lurk sex and violence. Of course, anyone could turn these pulpy ingredients into a play. Probably only Wilson, immersed in his Tennessee Williams period, could turn them into an elegiac jigsaw puzzle more reminiscent of Under Milk Wood than Tobacco Road." ... "The style Wilson employs in The Rimers of Eldritch used, if memory serves, to be called 'heightened realism.' As in Our Town, there is minimal scenery, and the whole town is on stage. But if Thornton Wilder's play is the rock of Americana, Wilson's explores what's crawling underneath."
