= Talley's Folly =

Play written by Lanford Wilson

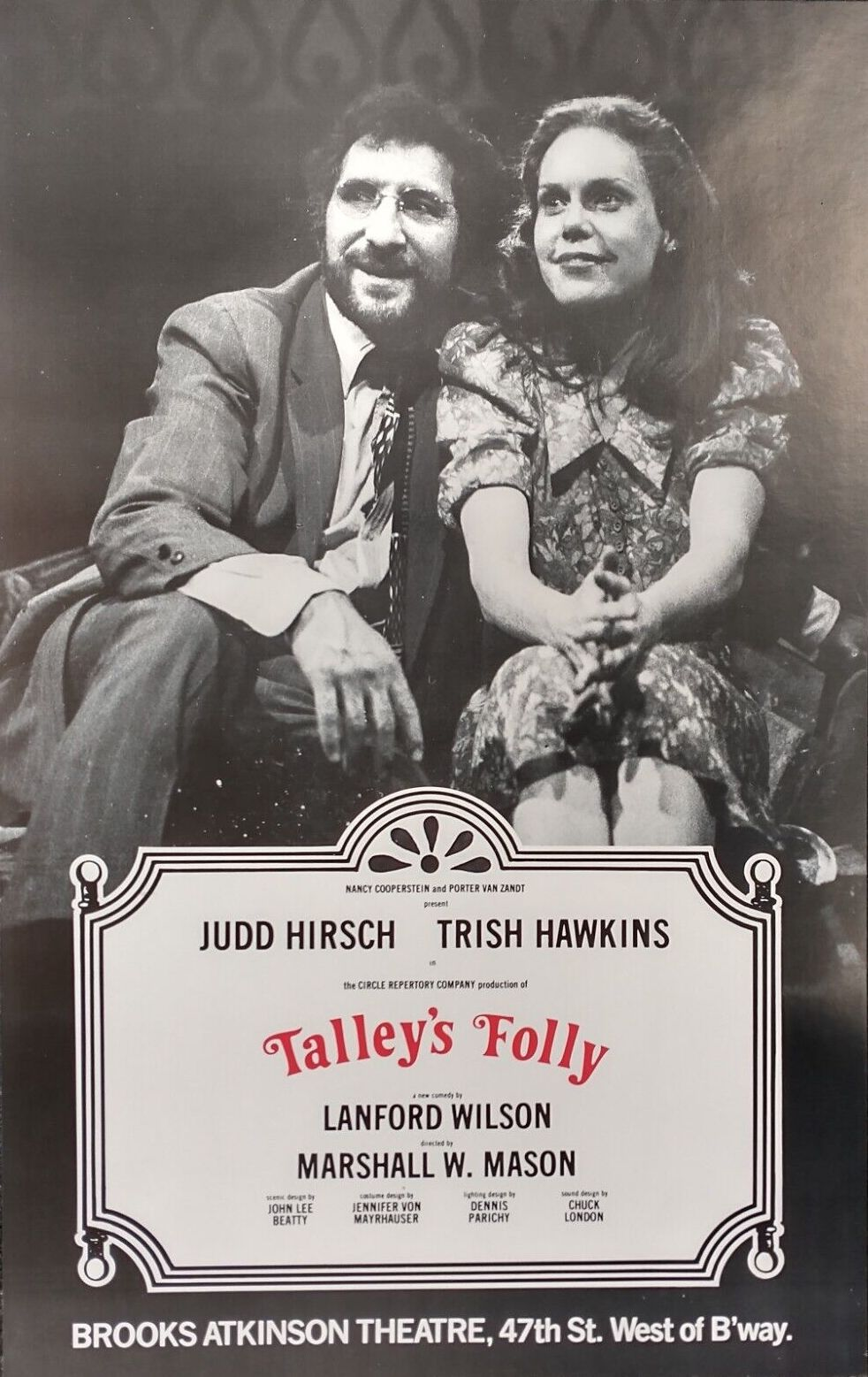
- Poster for the 1980 Broadway production
- Original language: English
- Written by: Lanford Wilson
- Characters: Sally Talley; Matt Friedman
- Series: The Talley Trilogy: Talley & Son; Talley's Folly; Fifth of July
- Subject: Two people who find a wholeness rare in human relationships
- Genre: Drama
- Setting: An old boathouse in rural Missouri, 1944

Premiere
- Date: February 20, 1980
- Place: Brooks Atkinson Theatre; New York City, New York

Talley's Folly is a 1980 play by American playwright Lanford Wilson. The play is the second in The Talley Trilogy, between his plays Talley & Son and Fifth of July. Set in a boathouse near rural Lebanon, Missouri in 1944, it is a romantic comedy following the characters Matt Friedman and Sally Talley as they settle their feelings for each other. Wilson received the 1980 Pulitzer Prize for Drama for the work. The play is unlike Wilson's other works, taking place in one act with no intermission, set in ninety-seven minutes of real time, with no set change.

== Plot summary ==
Talley's Folly depicts one night in the lives of two unlikely sweethearts, Matt Friedman and Sally Talley. The one-act play takes place in a boathouse on the Talley farm in Missouri on the Fourth of July, 1944.

The play opens with Matt directly addressing the audience, telling them that the play will take ninety-seven minutes and he hopes to relay his story properly in that time. Taking the time to point out some staging elements, he tells the audience that the gazebo-like structure next to him is a Victorian boathouse, which has fallen into disrepair. While on vacation in Lebanon, Missouri the previous summer, Matt met Sally and has sent her a letter every day since. Though the single reply from Sally gave him no hope for romantic encouragement, he has returned to ask her to marry him.

Sally arrives at the boathouse and is in disbelief that Matt has shown up uninvited, even though he had written her that he planned to come for the holiday. Matt's arrival has created a stir in Sally's conservative Protestant household, where a Jewish man is not welcomed, especially when his intentions are to court their daughter, who is eleven years younger than he.

Matt's interest in Sally had never waned. He once drove from his home in St. Louis to the hospital where she worked and waited hours for her, even after being informed that she was not available.

The conversation turns to the boathouse structure. Sally tells him it was constructed by her uncle, who built follies all over town. Her uncle did only what he wanted to do, and Sally considers him the healthiest member of the family for his courage.

Eventually, the couple begins to reminisce about the night they met and the time they spent together the previous summer. Matt takes it as a positive sign that she has changed into a nice dress before coming to see him tonight. Sally's protests do not match her behavior and he pushes forward. She is the most intriguing woman he has ever met, and he is determined to make her his wife.

Admitting that he has called Sally's aunt every two weeks during the past year, Matt reveals that he knows Sally was fired from a Sunday school teaching job. Apparently, she had been encouraging the students to read Thortstein Veblen's The Theory of the Leisure Class in addition to the Methodist reader. The rise of labor unions was affecting the families of the children in her class and she felt obligated to help educate them. Her unorthodox methods earned her the consternation of the church elders as well as her own family, who own the garment factory on which the labor issue centered.

Sally then tries to glean some information about Matt's background, a subject about which he is very guarded. He finally admits to Sally that he was probably born in Kaunas, Lithuania. His father had been an engineer. In 1911, his father was overheard in a French cafe discussing his work with nitrogen, a reference to the Haber process developed in 1909 by a Jewish-German chemist, Fritz Haber, to extract nitrogen from the air, which made the manufacture of gunpowder and fertilizer inexpensive. The family was later detained as they were attempting to cross the border.

Matt's father and older sister were tortured until the French realized that the father had no information of any value to them. In the meantime, the sister had fallen into a coma from which she never awoke. They later went to the German authorities and were again detained. Matt escaped to America through the help of some relatives. Haunted by his childhood grief, Matt vowed never to bring another child into the world. He was content with his life until he met Sally. He now feels forever changed and hopeful for the first time in his life.

Having risked the vulnerability of revealing his background, Matt presses Sally to share why she, a beautiful 31-year-old woman, has never married. She diverts the conversation to economics, which frustrates Matt. Sally finally reveals her disappointment in love many years ago, which makes her reluctant to fall in love again. Her family had partnered her with Harley Campbell, whose family was also wealthy. The match was supposedly made in heaven, especially for the business interests of the two families. Sally had been a cheerleader and Harley had been a basketball star.

Unfortunately, the families' fortunes waned during the Depression. In addition, Sally was struck with tuberculosis and sequestered for a long time. A pelvic infection left her infertile, and Harley's family no longer condoned their marriage.

Matt comments on the irony of their situation, that he'd been lamenting over the fact that he was in love with a woman but could never have children and now this woman presents him with the same situation. He believes that an angel has guided his path to her. Sally agrees to marry him and move to St. Louis, and they vow to return to the boathouse every year so they don't forget where they fell in love.

== Production history ==
Talley's Folly was first performed Off-Broadway by the Circle Repertory Company on May 1, 1979, closing on June 3, 1979. Directed by Marshall W. Mason, the cast starred Judd Hirsch as Matt Friedman and Trish Hawkins as Sally Talley. The set was designed by John Lee Beatty, with costumes by Jennifer von Mayrhauser, lighting by Dennis Parichy, and sound design by Chuck London. The production then transferred to the Mark Taper Forum in Los Angeles.

The play debuted on Broadway at the Brooks Atkinson Theatre on February 14, 1980, for previews, and closed on October 19, 1980, after 286 performances. Hirsch and Hawkins starred in the Broadway production. Jordan Chaney and Debra Mooney succeeded them in their roles in June 1980; Hirsch returned to the play in September of that year while Mooney remained with the production until it closed.

An off-Broadway revival was mounted at the Laura Pels Theater in March 2013, directed by Michael Wilson and featuring Danny Burstein and Sarah Paulson.

Talley's Folly was produced in London at the Lyric Theatre, Hammersmith, opening on May 27, 1982, and running until the July 3, 1982. Sally was played by Hayley Mills and Matt was played by Jonathan Pryce.

== Awards and nominations ==
Awards

- 1980 Drama Critics' Circle Award
- 1980 Pulitzer Prize for Drama
- 1979 Obie Award: Judd Hirsch, Performance
- 1980 Tony Award for Best Scenic Design: John Lee Beatty
- 1980 Drama Desk Award for Outstanding Lighting Design: Dennis Parichy
- 1980 Drama Desk Award for Outstanding Set Design: John Lee Beatty

Nominations

- 1979/1980 Drama Desk Award for Outstanding New Play
- 1979/1980 Drama Desk Award for Outstanding Actor in a Play: Judd Hirsch
- 1980 Drama Desk Award for Outstanding Director of a Play
- 1980 Tony Award for Best Play
- 1980 Tony Award for Best Direction of a Play
- 1980 Tony Award for Best Actor in a Play: Judd Hirsch
- 1980 Tony Award for Best Lighting Design: Dennis Parichy
