= Fifth of July (play) =

Play by Lanford Wilson

- Original language: English
- Written by: Lanford Wilson
- Series: Talley Trilogy
- Genre: Comedy
- Setting: The Talley Place, a farm near Lebanon, Missouri.

Premiere
- Date: April 27, 1978
- Place: Circle Repertory Company; New York City

Fifth of July is a 1978 play by Lanford Wilson. Set in rural Missouri in 1977, it revolves around the Talley family and their friends, and focuses on the disillusionment in the wake of the Vietnam War. It premiered on Broadway in 1980 and was later produced as a made-for-television movie.

The play is part of the Talley Trilogy, a series of Wilson plays revolving around the Talley family of Lebanon, Missouri. The other plays, both set on July 4, 1944, are Talley's Folly, a one-act dialogue between Sally Talley and her husband-to-be, Matthew Friedman, and Talley & Son, the story of a power struggle between Sally's father and grandfather.

== Plot summary ==
Kenneth Talley Jr. is a gay double amputee Vietnam veteran living in his childhood home with his boyfriend, botanist Jed Jenkins. At the beginning of the play, he is due to return to his former high school to teach English, but has decided not to. Visiting Ken and Jed are Ken's sister, June Talley, and her daughter, Shirley, as well as Ken and June's longtime friends, John Landis and his wife Gwen, inheritor of a large industrial copper conglomerate. John is ostensibly visiting to purchase the Talley house for Gwen to convert to a recording studio, so that she can have a career as a country singer. Unbeknownst to anyone but June, John and Ken, Shirley is actually John's daughter, and the visit is also his attempt to gain joint custody of Shirley. Ken, meanwhile, believes that the singing career is a way of distracting Gwen so that John can take over her business. Other visitors include Weston Hurley, Gwen's guitarist, and Ken's aunt, Sally Talley, who still has her husband Matt's ashes in a candy box a year after his death. The play culminates with a "bidding war" between Sally and John for the house, after it is revealed that Ken plans on selling it to Landis. Sally ultimately outbids Landis and says she will give the house to Jed so he can finish his garden.

== Production history ==
Fifth of July debuted off-Broadway at the Circle Repertory Company on April 27 and closed on October 1, 1978. Directed by Marshall W. Mason, the cast starred William Hurt as Kenneth Talley Jr., Jeff Daniels, Amy Wright, Danton Stone, and Jonathan Hogan, who also composed the incidental music for the production. The production was designed by John Lee Beatty. It ran for 159 performances.

The play made its Broadway debut at the New Apollo Theatre on November 5, 1980, directed by Mason with Daniels reprising the role of Jed, Christopher Reeve as Ken, and Swoosie Kurtz as Gwen. Replacement actors for the role of Ken included Richard Thomas, Michael O'Keefe, Timothy Bottoms, and his brother Joseph Bottoms. Laraine Newman replaced Kurtz as Gwen. Kathy Bates was also a replacement, in the role of June. Swoosie Kurtz won the Tony Award for Best Featured Actress in a Play.

A television film was made in 1982, directed by Mason and Kirk Browning. The film stars Daniels, Kurtz, Hogan, Stone, Cynthia Nixon, Joyce Reehling, Helen Stenborg, and Richard Thomas as Ken, the role in which he succeeded Reeve on Broadway.

A revival, starring Robert Sean Leonard as Ken and Parker Posey as Gwen, was included in the Signature Theater Company's 2002–2003 tribute season to Wilson. David Harbour, Ebon Moss-Bachrach, and Jon Bernthal were also featured in the cast. Michael Cerveris would replace Leonard later in the run.

== Awards and nominations ==
=== Original Off-Broadway production ===
Year	Award	Category	Nominee	Result
1978	Drama Desk Award	Outstanding Play		Nominated

=== Original Broadway production ===
Year	Award	Category	Nominee	Result
1981	Tony Award	Best Play		Nominated
1981	Tony Award	Best Featured Actress in a Play	Swoosie Kurtz	Won
1981	Tony Award	Best Direction of a Play	Marshall W. Mason	Nominated
1981	Tony Award	Best Scenic Design	John Lee Beatty	Nominated
1981	Tony Award	Best Lighting Design	Dennis Parichy	Nominated
1981	Drama Desk Award	Outstanding Play		Nominated
1981	Drama Desk Award	Outstanding Featured Actor in a Play	Jeff Daniels	Nominated
1981	Drama Desk Award	Outstanding Featured Actress in a Play	Swoosie Kurtz	Won
1981	Drama Desk Award	Outstanding Set Design	John Lee Beatty	Nominated
1981	Drama Desk Award	Outstanding Lighting Design	Dennis Parichy	Nominated
