= Dennis Parichy =

American lighting designer

Dennis Parichy is an American lighting designer. He won the 1980 Drama Desk Award for Talley's Folly and the Obie Award in 1981.

== Career ==
Parichy has designed lighting for 25 Broadway productions since 1976, including: The Price, The Tenth Man, Coastal Disturbances, Penn & Teller, Burn This, The Nerd, As Is, Angels Fall, The Best Little Whorehouse in Texas, Duet for One, Crimes of the Heart, The Water Engine, and Knock Knock.

He has designed for Off-Broadway and regional theatres as well. His first Off-Broadway show was Little Eyolf at the Actors Playhouse in 1964; he was the lighting designer for the Lanford Wilson plays Ludlow Fair at Caffe Cino in 1965 and Book of Days in a Signature Theatre Company production in November 2002.

Parichy has been nominated three times for a Tony Award, for his work on Redwood Curtain (1993), Fifth of July (1981), and Talley's Folly (1980), for which he won a 1980 Drama Desk Award.

He was the resident lighting designer for Circle Repertory Company where he worked with director Marshall W. Mason on the first productions of plays by many American playwrights. He lit many productions for the Manhattan Theatre Club, such as The Miss Firecracker Contest (1984), Bloody Poetry (1987) and Aristocrats (1989).

He has had a long working relationship with Athol Fugard. He designed the lighting for Fugard's Scenes from Soweto (Manhattan Theatre Club, 1978), Statements After an Arrest Under the Immorality Act (Manhattan Theatre Club, 1978), Boesman and Lena (Off-Broadway, 1992), Playland (1993) (Manhattan Theatre Club), and My Children! My Africa! (Off-Broadway, 1989). At the McCarter Theatre, Princeton, New Jersey, he was the lighting designer for The Captain's Tiger (1998); at Seattle Repertory Theatre he designed the lighting for Valley Song in January 1998.

He is one of the company artists at People's Light and Theatre Company, Malvern, Pennsylvania, and has provided lighting for many shows there since 2004. He was the lighting designer for People's Light production of Nathan the Wise starring David Straithairn in September 2009.

Among his many works in regional theatre he designed the lighting for the Repertory of St. Louis Repertory Theatre and Hartford Stage production of Lanford Wilson's Book of Days in 1999, starring Dee Hoty. He was the lighting designer for the Cincinnati Playhouse in the Park production of Tally's Folly in 2001. He was the lighting designer for the Pittsburgh Public Theater production of Who's Afraid of Virginia Woolf? in 1999, starring Bonnie Franklin.

He received the 1981 Obie Award for sustained excellence in lighting design.

Parichy teaches Theatre Design/Technology at Purchase College. He is a graduate of Northwestern University.
