= Marshall W. Mason =

American theater director

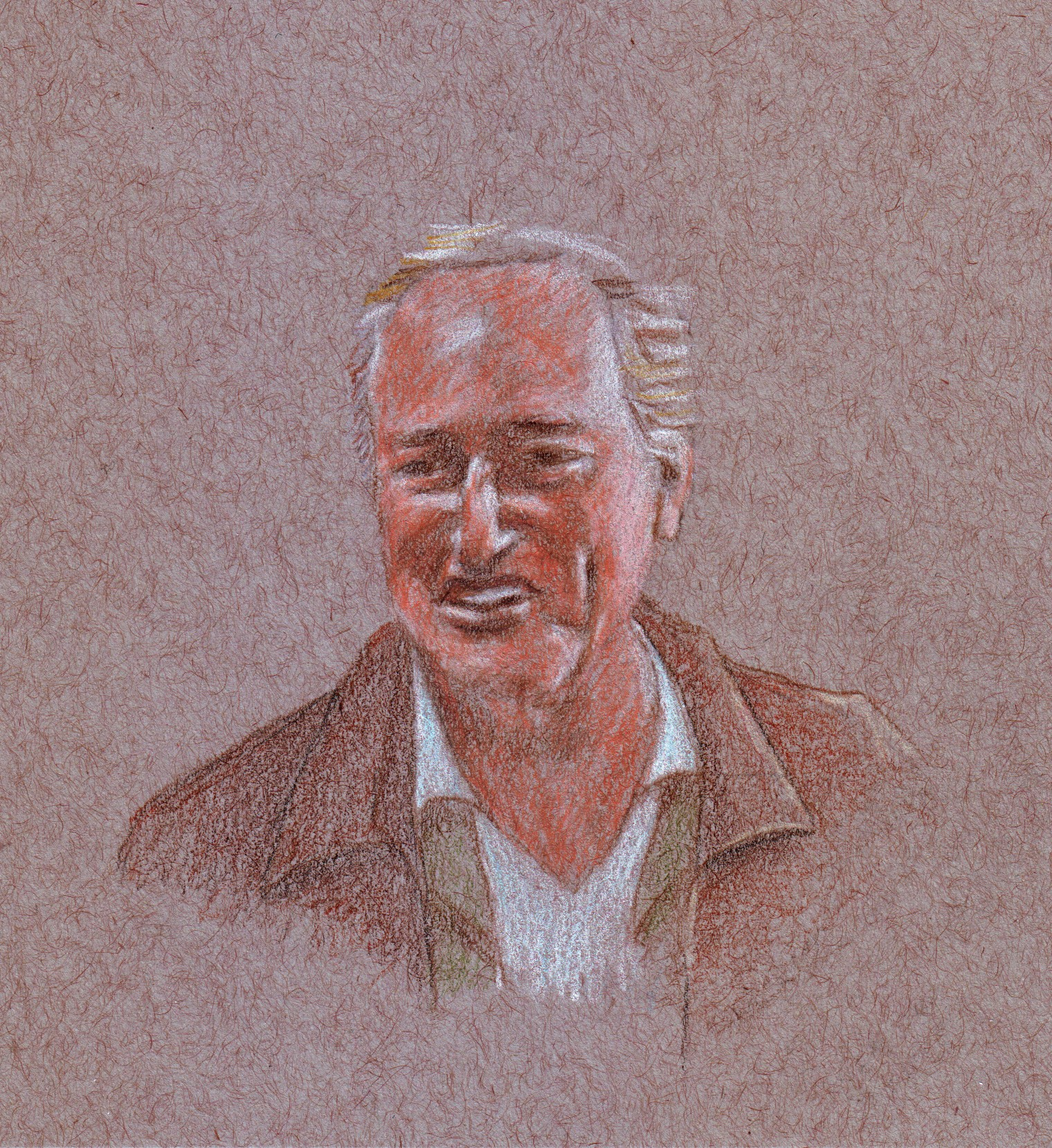
- Born: February 24, 1940 (age 86); Amarillo, Texas
- Occupation: Director
- Spouse: Daniel Irvine (m. 2011)

Marshall W. Mason (born February 24, 1940) is an American theater director, educator, and writer. Mason founded the Circle Repertory Company in New York City and was artistic director of the company for 18 years (1969–1987). He received an Obie Award for Sustained Achievement in 1983. In 2016, he received the Tony Award for Lifetime Achievement in the Theater.

From 1983 to 1986, Mason was president of the Stage Directors and Choreographers Society, a national labor union.

== Early life, education, and off-off-Broadway ==
Mason was born in Amarillo, Texas, on February 24, 1940. He graduated from Northwestern University with a bachelor's degree in theater in 1961. At the age of 19, while at Northwestern, he received his first award for directing a production of Tennessee Williams' Cat on a Hot Tin Roof.

Upon graduating, he moved to Manhattan, where he began working in the off-off-Broadway theater movement in venues such as the Caffe Cino, La MaMa Experimental Theatre Club, and the Judson Poets Theatre.

Mason directed multiple productions at La MaMa during the 1960s. The first was Balm in Gilead (1965), which was also his first collaboration with playwright Lanford Wilson. He then directed Wilson's The Sand Castle or There is a Tavern in the Town or Harry Can Dance and The Girl on the BBC, both at La MaMa in 1965. He directed a second production of The Sand Castle in 1967. That same year, Mason directed a production of Donald Julian's A Coffee Ground Among the Tea Leaves at La MaMa. In 1969, he directed a production of Julian's In Praise of Folly with set design by Wilson.

Since their early collaboration at La MaMa, Mason has directed over sixty productions of Lanford Wilson's plays. Playbill has identified this as the longest collaboration between a playwright and director in the history of American theater. Among these productions are The Hot l Baltimore, for which Mason won his first Obie Award for Distinguished Direction in 1973; Fifth of July (1978); Talley's Folly (1979); Angels Fall (1983); Burn This (1987); and Redwood Curtain (1992).

== Off-Broadway productions ==
He made his off-Broadway debut in 1964 with a revival of Henrik Ibsen's Little Eyolf. In the decades since, Mason has been awarded five Obie Awards for Outstanding Direction:

- Lanford Wilson's The Hot l Baltimore (1973)
- New York premiere of Tennessee Williams' Battle of Angels (1974)
- Lanford Wilson's The Mound Builders (1975)
- Jules Feiffer's Knock Knock (1976)
- Lanford Wilson's Serenading Louie (1976)

He directed 42 productions Off-Broadway, including Edward J. Moore's The Sea Horse (1974), Romulus Linney's Childe Byron (1981), Lanford Wilson's Talley & Son (1985), William Mastrosimone's Sunshine (1989), Larry Kramer's The Destiny of Me (1992), Lanford Wilson's Sympathetic Magic (1997) and Wilson's Book of Days (2002).

== Broadway productions ==
His Broadway debut was on February 24, 1976, with a production of Jules Feiffer's Knock Knock, for which he received his first Tony Award for Best Direction of a Play nomination. He has since directed twelve productions on Broadway and has been nominated for the Tony Award five times. His additional Broadway credits include Albert Innaurato's Gemini (1977); Ron Clark and Sam Bobrick's Murder at the Howard Johnson's (1979); Lanford Wilson's Fifth of July (1980), Talley's Folly (1980), and Angels Fall (1983); Peter Nichols' Passion (1983); William M. Hoffman's As Is (Drama Desk Award for Best Play, 1985); Lanford Wilson's Burn This (1988); Chekhov's The Seagull (1992); Rupert Holmes' Solitary Confinement (1992); and Lanford Wilson's Redwood Curtain (1992).

== Regional theater productions, international productions, and television ==
He has worked widely in regional theater, including the Mark Taper Forum in Los Angeles, the Guthrie Theater in Minneapolis, the Steppenwolf Theater in Chicago, Arena Stage and Ford's Theater in Washington, D.C., the McCarter Theater in Princeton, the Hartford Stage Company, the Pittsburgh Public Theater, the Repertory Theater of St. Louis, the Cincinnati Playhouse, and the Milwaukee Rep. For the 1988 season, he was appointed guest artistic director of the Ahmanson Theatre of the Los Angeles Music Center.

Mason has directed three productions in London as well as Who's Afraid of Virginia Woolf? at the National Theatre of Japan in Tokyo.

On television, Mason has directed William Inge’s Picnic, Lanford Wilson’s The Mound Builders and Fifth of July, and Robert Patrick’s Kennedy's Children. He has received two CableACE Award nominations for his productions on Showtime.

== Awards and recognition ==
On Broadway, Mason has been nominated for the Tony Award for Best Direction of a Play five times. Off-Broadway, he has received five Obie Awards for Outstanding Direction of a play and a sixth Obie Award for Sustained Achievement. He is the recipient of the 1979 Theatre World Award and the 1977 Margo Jones Award for his discovery and nurturing of new playwrights and actors in his work with the Circle Repertory Company. In 1999, he was recognized with a Mr. Abbott Special Millennium Award as one of the most innovative and influential directors of the twentieth century.

In 2014, he was elected to the Theater Hall of Fame. He received the 2015 Artistic Achievement Award from the New York Innovative Theater Foundation. In 2016, Mason received the Special Tony Award for Lifetime Achievement in the Theatre.

== Teaching and writing ==
Mason is Professor Emeritus of Theater at Arizona State University, where he taught for ten years. In 2001, he was honored with ASU’s Creative Activity Award.

He was the chief drama critic for the Phoenix New Times, a weekly newspaper, in 1994-1995, and received the 1995 Phoenix Press Club Award for his writing about the performing arts. He wrote Creating Life On Stage: A Director's Approach to Working with Actors (2007) and The Transcendent Years: Circle Repertory Theater and the '60s, published as a Kindle e-book in 2016.

He is a member of the College of Fellows of the American Theatre at the Kennedy Center.

== Personal life ==
He lives in Mazatlán, Mexico and in Manhattan.

On July 25, 2011, the first Monday after New York State enacted its marriage equality law, Mason married his partner of 37 years, theater artist Daniel Irvine.

== Additional directing credits ==
- Home Free! (1965)
- The Madness of Lady Bright (London, 1968)
- The Gingham Dog (1968)
- Three Sisters (1970)
- A Streetcar Named Desire (1978)
- Hamlet (with William Hurt) (1979)
- Mary Stuart (1979)
- Foxfire (1981)
- Who's Afraid of Virginia Woolf? (Tokyo, 1985)
- Summer and Smoke (1988)
- Sleuth (National Tour) (1988)
- A Poster of the Cosmos (1994)
- The Moonshot Tape (1994)
- Cakewalk (1996)
- Robbers (1997)
- King Lear (1998)
- Long Day's Journey into Night (1998)
- The Elephant Man (London, 1998)
- Ghosts (2001)
- Private Lives (2002)
- Cat on a Hot Tin Roof (2005)
- The Goat, or Who is Sylvia? (2006)
