= The Hot l Baltimore =

Play written by Lanford Wilson

The Hot L Baltimore
- Window card for the Gastown Actor's Studio 2001 production
- Original language: English
- Written by: Lanford Wilson
- Subject: a manager's struggle to maintain order despite the hotel's destruction
- Genre: Comedy
- Setting: The lobby of a seedy run-down hotel in Baltimore

Premiere
- Date: 22 March 1973
- Place: Circle in the Square Downtown; New York City

The Hot L Baltimore is a 1973 American play by Lanford Wilson set in the lobby of the Hotel Baltimore. The plot focuses on the residents of the decaying property, who are faced with eviction when the structure is condemned. The play draws its title from the hotel's neon marquee with a burned-out "e" that was never replaced.

== Production history ==
The Hot L Baltimore was produced by the Circle Repertory Company on February 4, 1973. It then transferred to the off-Broadway Circle in the Square Downtown on March 22, 1973. The production closed on January 4, 1976, after 1,166 performances. It was directed by Marshall W. Mason, and the cast included Trish Hawkins, Conchata Ferrell, Judd Hirsch, Jonathan Hogan, and Mari Gorman.

The play won the New York Drama Critics' Circle Award for Best American Play of 1972–73, multiple Obie Awards (Best American Play, Lanford Wilson; Distinguished Performance, Mari Gorman; Distinguished Direction, Marshall W. Mason), the John Gassner Playwriting Award, and an Outer Critics Circle Award.

It was produced at the Williamstown Theater Festival in Williamstown, Massachusetts, in July 2000, directed by Joe Mantello, with the cast featuring Sam Rockwell, Mandy Siegfried, Lois Smith, Helen Hanft, and Becky Ann Baker. It was then produced by the Steppenwolf Theatre Company in Chicago from March through May 2011, directed by Tina Landau.

== Adaptations ==
In 1975, producer Norman Lear adapted the play for a half-hour ABC sitcom. The cast included Conchata Ferrell, James Cromwell, Richard Masur, Al Freeman Jr., Gloria LeRoy, Jeannie Linero, and Charlotte Rae. The sitcom had several controversial elements, including two main characters who worked as prostitutes, one of whom was an illegal immigrant, and one of the first gay couples to be depicted on an American television series. The network supported the show and gave it a full publicity campaign, but the series failed to win an audience and was canceled after 13 episodes.

In 1976, a version of the series, with the title Hôtel Baltimore, was produced for French television. The series, which featured Dora Doll, lasted for a single season.

== Critical reception ==
Mel Gussow, in his review of the 1973 production for The New York Times, wrote that Wilson "writes with understanding and sensitivity about unwanted people... There are moments in this play... when Wilson - with his passion for idiosyncratic characters, atmospheric details and invented homilies - reminds me of William Saroyan and Thornton Wilder... The play seems to meander... there is little plot or action but there is emotion."

== Awards ==
- 1973: New York Drama Critics' Circle Award for Best American Play
- 1973: Obie Award for Best American Play
