= Home Free! =

One-act play written by Lanford Wilson

- Written by: Lanford Wilson
- Original language: English
- Genre: One-act play

Premiere
- Date premiered: 1964
- Place premiered: New York City

Home Free! is a one-act play by American playwright Lanford Wilson. The play is among Wilson's earlier works, and was first produced off-off-Broadway at the Caffe Cino in 1964.

== Production history ==
The play premiered at Joe Cino's Caffe Cino in New York City in January 1964 and was revived there in August 1964. The production was directed by William Archibald.

In 1965, the play was produced alongside Wilson's No Trespassing for the La MaMa Repertory Troupe's first European tour. It was produced alongside The Madness of Lady Bright on tour in London in 1968.

Home Free! was produced off-Broadway in February 1965 at the New Playwrights series at the Cherry Lane Theatre. The play was presented in a production of three plays. The other two plays in the production were Sam Shepard's Up to Thursday and Paul Foster's Balls. The series was headed by Edward Albee, Richard Barr, and Clinton Wilder. Wilson's play featured Michael Warren Powell.

== Characters ==
Lawrence and Joanna are the play's two major characters. The additional characters Edna and Claypone are mentioned by Lawrence and Joanna, but have no lines and are not mentioned in the Dramatis personae or the stage directions. This implies that they are fictional characters in the minds of Lawrence and Joanna. Lawrence and Joanna are brother and sister. However, the play strongly implies that they are having an incestuous relationship, which has resulted in Joanna's pregnancy.

Lawrence (and, to a lesser degree, Joanna) is characterized by extreme agoraphobia. He is suspicious of everything that Joanna tells him about the outside world. At the end of the play, Lawrence refuses to go out, even to save Joanna's life. Lawrence believes totally in Edna and Claypone's existence, and Joanna mostly seems to share this belief. However, when Lawrence sends Edna to fetch the doctor, Joanna screams, "No, Lawrence, you go! You go!!!' This implies that Joanna knows that Edna doesn't exist and can't fetch the doctor, and that she has merely been pretending for Lawrence's sake.

== Plot summary ==
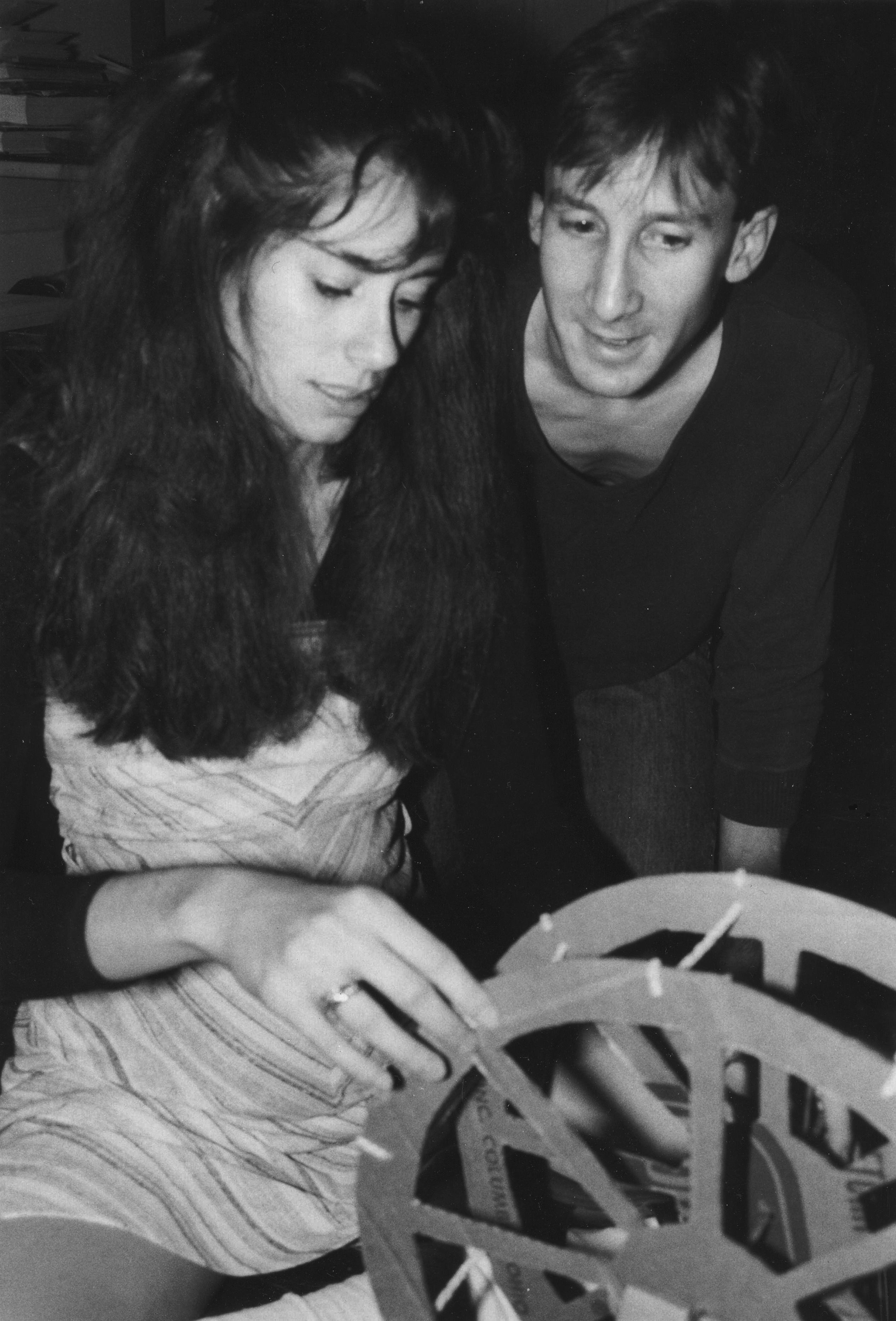
Joanna (Lee Taylor-Allan) and Lawrence (Kenneth Boys) in the 1986 New York revival of Home Free!

Lawrence opens the play by delivering a lesson on astronomy, focusing on the Pleiades. While describing the effects of universal expansion, he becomes excited and jumps around the room, imitating the stars being flung in every direction. He eventually gets tired and starts muttering to himself about Joanna's return from the grocery store and what she has in the "Surprise Box", a brightly colored box that they use to give surprise gifts to each other.

Joanna enters in a panic, having been seen by some frightening entity called either Pruneface or Wienerface, or both. She is pregnant. They engage in a number of strange, playful, seemingly random conversations. Joanna tells Lawrence about an encounter she had on the subway with a college-aged boy, and Lawrence accuses her of having sex with him. They play games, including one where Joanna is a queen and Lawrence commands Edna and Claypone to fetch her various things. All of a sudden, however, he halts the game with the line: "You're not a queen, you're a whore."

Eventually Joanna collapses, seemingly unable to walk. She screams at Lawrence to get a doctor, but he is afraid of the outside world and refuses to go outside, preferring to send Edna instead. Joanna's pains, possibly the result of pre-eclampsia, persist. She eventually falls, unmoving, onto the bed. Lawrence leans over her and begs her to return, falling into a stutter as the play ends.
