= The Madness of Lady Bright =

Play written by Lanford Wilson

- Original language: English
- Written by: Lanford Wilson
- Characters: Leslie Bright; Boy (Voices); Girl (Voices)
- Genre: Monologue
- Setting: New York City, 1960s

Premiere
- Date: May 1964
- Place: Caffe Cino, Greenwich Village, New York

The Madness of Lady Bright is a short play by Lanford Wilson, among the earliest of the gay theatre movement. The play was first performed at Joe Cino's Caffe Cino in May 1964.

It then toured internationally, and has appeared in revivals to the present day. The Madness of Lady Bright has been cited as the first off-off-Broadway production to receive mainstream critical attention, and earned its original lead actor, Neil Flanagan, an Obie Award. The play, primarily a monologue delivered by its aging drag queen protagonist, has been characterized as among the first to portray gay characters in an unsensational way. It is also one of Wilson's last plays to make substantial use of experimental devices before he began using a more realistic approach.

== Background ==
The Madness of Lady Bright is among Wilson's earliest plays to be produced, following Home Free! (1964) and So Long At The Fair. It was the first of his works to present gay themes explicitly, and has been cited as one of the earliest American plays to focus on gay themes. Critics have noted that the play contains some of Wilson's last uses of experimental devices, such as the presence of "unreal" characters, before he adopted a more realistic style from the mid-1960s onwards. The "unreal" characters in this play are two figures, named Boy and Girl. They give voice to the criticisms Leslie has encountered throughout his life, and represent a range of dramatis personae (old friends and lovers) whom he recalls. Wilson wrote the play during slow shifts while working as a receptionist at the Americana Hotel in New York City. Responsible for the low-traffic night-time reservations desk, he had ample time to produce his manuscript on the hotel's typewriter, an experience he likened to Tennessee Williams's practice of writing while working selling subway tokens from a booth. A desk-clerk colleague of his at the Americana was purportedly among the inspirations for protagonist Leslie Bright. Wilson cited his dislike of Adrienne Kennedy's play Funnyhouse of a Negro as among his influences in writing the work:

[S]eeing this silly black girl flip out in her room was the most uninteresting idea. I'd just as soon see some screaming faggot go mad, and I said, "wait a minute!"

== Themes ==
The play consists primarily of a monologue delivered by the aging drag queen Leslie Bright, reflecting on the passions of his life. These include his attempts at self-invention, modeled on such figures as Miss America, Judy Garland, and Venus, and the encounters and loves that have shaped him. Bright, alone in his New York City room on a hot summer's day, descends gradually into madness as the play progresses.

Journalist Anne Marie Welsh describes The Madness of Lady Bright as the first contemporary play in which "gay characters were portrayed as humans, not as villains, depressives or deviants". A similar claim has been made for Doric Wilson's Now She Dances!, an interpretation of Oscar Wilde's Salome, produced three years earlier at the Caffe Cino. Scholars have cited the play as among the works at the beginning of the gay theatre movement in 1960s New York, prior to such works as Mart Crowley's The Boys in the Band. Others have contended that, because it treats the characters' homosexuality as background and context, rather than as integral to the play's plot, The Madness of Lady Bright should not be considered "a gay play". Critics have noted the themes of isolation and desperation in the play, and report that older female audience members approach Wilson to tell him that they understood the play's theme as "not homosexuality but loneliness."

== Production history ==
The production opened in May 1964 at Caffe Cino in Greenwich Village, directed by Denis Deegan. Wilson had originally wanted his friend Neil Flanagan to direct the play, but when Flanagan expressed a preference for playing the lead role, Wilson chose Deegan, who had also directed his earlier play So Long At The Fair. Wilson was impressed by the director's interpretation of the text and his suggestion for accompanying the play with the second movement of Mozart's Piano Concerto Number 23.

The Madness of Lady Bright became Caffe Cino's first popular success, and the first production to be extended and later revived at the theater. It ran for 205 performances before the Caffe Cino closed, following Cino's suicide, in 1968.

The American Theater Project toured the show in the United Kingdom during 1966, performing at the Mercury Theatre in Notting Hill and the Traverse Theater in Edinburgh, directed by Marshall W. Mason and starring Charles Stanley in the title role, cited by the New Statesman as "the finest performance currently to be seen in London." It was produced by La MaMa Experimental Theatre Club's repertory troupe, alongside Wilson's Home Free!, on tour in London in 1968. The play has been produced throughout the United States, in Canada, and in Singapore.

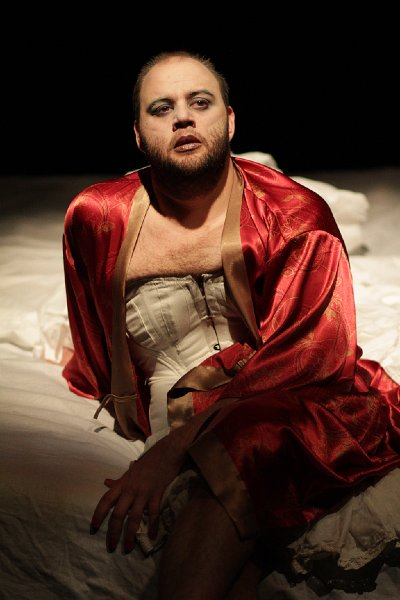
Michael-Alan Read as Leslie Bright in the 2014 production

In 2014, a 50th-anniversary production was held in Glasgow, Scotland as part of the Glasgay! Festival. The production featured Michael-Alan Read as Leslie Bright, Lynnette Holmes as Girl, and Martin McBride as Boy. The show was co-produced by Glasgow's Cardboard Fox Theatre Company and was praised by reviewers. It was directed by Phil Bartlett and restaged by Helen Cuinn. The production was notable for its simple set design, using only a mattress and sheets on which the names of Leslie's lovers were scrawled.

The 2024 revival, presented by Cleveland's minimalist theatre company, Cesear's Forum, reunited another 1960's one-act play by Wilson, the combination entitled Ludlow Fair & The Madness of Lady Bright, at Kennedy's Down Under, Playhouse Square. Co-directed by Greg Cesear and Tricia Bestic, the cast included Graceyn Cecilia Dowd (Girl) double cast (Rachel) in the former play and featured Matthew Wright in the latter as Leslie "Lady" Bright with Daniel Telford (Boy). Cleveland Scene's, Christine Howey, wrote: "As written by Wilson, Lady Bright does not have a story arc, it has a serrated edge that Wright energetically navigates as his mind slowly slips into madness."

== Reception ==
As one of the first plays to depict an explicitly gay protagonist, the work was characterized by some as shocking even to the avant-garde, and predominantly gay, audiences at Caffe Cino. Others have stressed its role in shifting gay plots and characters into the mainstream of theatre culture. The show was also the first off-off-Broadway production to receive mainstream critical coverage. It had a positive review in the New York Post and was later covered by The Village Voice, Wall Street Journal, New York Times, and others. The VillageVoice called the play "poignant and funny", possessed of "more than routine interest". The Boy and Girl characters, it felt, were too "smoothly generalized" to succeed, but overall the review deemed the writing strong. Later critics have compared Leslie Bright to the fading belles found in the works of Tennessee Williams, suggesting an echo of the conclusion of A Streetcar Named Desire in Bright's final hallucination of doctors coming to inter him.

The original lead actor, Neil Flanagan, won an Obie Award for his portrayal of protagonist Leslie Bright.
