= Lanford Wilson =

American playwright (1937–2011)

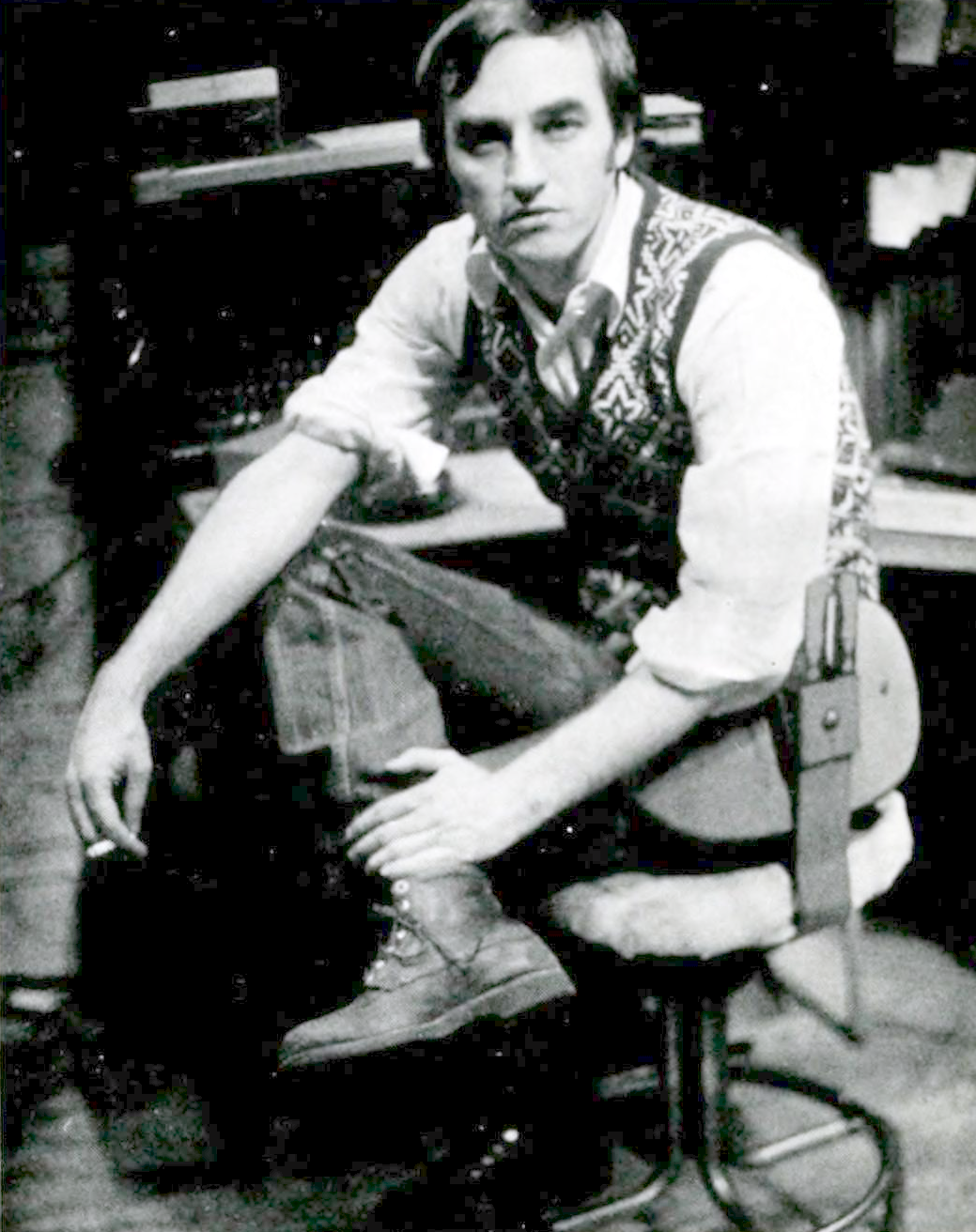
- Wilson c. 1973
- Born: April 13, 1937; Lebanon, Missouri, US
- Died: March 24, 2011 (aged 73); Wayne, New Jersey, US
- Education: Missouri State University; San Diego State University
- Writing career
- Period: 1964–2006
- Notable awards: Pulitzer Prize for Drama (1980); Artistic Achievement Award from the New York Innovative Theatre Awards (2010)

Lanford Wilson (April 13, 1937 – March 24, 2011) was an American playwright. His work, as described by The New York Times, was "earthy, realist, greatly admired [and] widely performed". Wilson helped to advance the off-off-Broadway theater movement with his earliest plays, which were first produced at the Caffe Cino beginning in 1964. He was one of the first playwrights to move from off-off-Broadway to off-Broadway, then Broadway and beyond.

Wilson was awarded a Guggenheim Fellowship in Drama & Performance Art in 1972. He received the Pulitzer Prize for Drama in 1980 and was elected in 2001 to the American Theater Hall of Fame. In 2004, Wilson was elected to the American Academy of Arts and Letters and received the PEN/Laura Pels International Foundation for Theater Award as a Master American Dramatist. He was nominated for three Tony Awards and has won a Drama Desk Award and five Obie Awards.

Wilson's 1964 short play The Madness of Lady Bright was his first major success and led to further works throughout the 1960s that expressed a variety of social and romantic themes. In 1969, he co-founded the Circle Repertory Company with theatre director Marshall W. Mason. He wrote many plays for the Circle Repertory in the 1970s. His 1973 play The Hot l Baltimore was the company's first major success with both audiences and critics. The off-Broadway production exceeded 1,000 performances.

His play Fifth of July was first produced at Circle Repertory in 1978. He received a Tony Award nomination for its Broadway production, which opened in 1980. A prequel to Fifth of July called Talley's Folly (opened 1979 at Circle Repertory) opened on Broadway before Fifth of July and won Wilson the 1980 Pulitzer Prize for Drama and his first Tony nomination. Burn This (1987) was another Broadway success. Wilson also wrote the libretti for several operas.

== Childhood and education ==
Wilson was born to Ralph Eugene and Violetta Tate Wilson in Lebanon, Missouri. After his parents divorced when he was 5, he moved with his mother to Springfield, Missouri, where they lived until she remarried. When he was 11, his mother married Walt E. Lenhard, a farmer from Ozark, Missouri, and they both moved in with him. He had two half-brothers, John and Jim, and one stepsister, Judy. He attended high school in Ozark and developed a love for film and art. As a child, Wilson enjoyed writing short stories and going to see plays performed at Southwest Missouri State College (now Missouri State University). A production of Brigadoon had a particularly resounding effect on Wilson, saying that "after that town came back to life on stage, movies didn't stand a chance". He developed an interest in acting and performed in his high school plays, including the role of Tom in The Glass Menagerie by Tennessee Williams.

After graduating from Ozark High School in 1955, Wilson began his collegiate studies at Southwest Missouri State College. In 1956, he moved to San Diego, where his father had relocated after his parents' divorce. He studied art and art history at San Diego State College as well as worked as a riveter at the Ryan Aircraft Plant. His reunion with his father was difficult, but the relationship improved in later years, and Wilson based his play Lemon Sky on their relationship. Wilson left college and moved to Chicago in 1957, where he worked as a graphic artist for an advertising firm. During this time, Wilson realized that the short stories he had always enjoyed writing would be more effective as plays, and began to study playwriting at the University of Chicago extension program.

== Early work (1962–1968) ==
In 1962, Wilson moved to Greenwich Village in New York City. He worked in odd jobs, such as a temporary typist, a reservations clerk at Americana Hotel, at the complaint desk of a furniture store, and at a dishwashing job where a co-worker incorrectly called him "Lance". After that, Wilson's friends all called him by that name. Wilson eventually worked for the subscription office of the New York Shakespeare Festival.

Wilson first encountered the Caffe Cino when he went to see Eugène Ionesco's The Lesson. The experience left him thinking that theatre "could be both dangerous and funny in that way at the same time". After the show, Wilson introduced himself to Cino co-founder and producer Joe Cino, a pioneer of the off-off-Broadway movement. Cino encouraged Wilson to submit a play to the Cino. In Cino, Wilson found a mentor who would not only critique his plays, but also stage them.

Wilson's first play to premiere at Cino was So Long at the Fair, in August 1963. His works for Caffe Cino include Ludlow Fair (originally titled Nail Polish and Tampons), Home Free!, and The Madness of Lady Bright. He continued working odd jobs to support himself during these early years. The Madness of Lady Bright premiered at Caffe Cino in May 1964. The play concerns "Lady" Bright, who is a forty-year-old "screaming preening queen". On a sultry summer day in the 1960s, while in his apartment on the Upper West Side of Manhattan, "Lady" Bright slowly loses his mind. It is a complex and comic tragedy of striking originality, and one of Wilson's most notable and finest works. At its heart, the work is a penetrating study of loneliness and isolation. It was one of off-off-Broadway's first significant successes, running for over 200 performances. The Madness of Lady Bright set a record as the longest-running play at Caffe Cino.

In 1965, Wilson began writing plays for Ellen Stewart's La MaMa Experimental Theatre Club in the East Village. His first full-length plays premiered at La MaMa, including Balm in Gilead, which depicted a doomed romance in an urban greasy spoon diner inhabited by junkies, prostitutes and thieves. Balm in Gilead premiered at La MaMa in 1965, directed by Marshall W. Mason. The play was revived in 1984 by Circle Repertory Company and the Steppenwolf Theatre Company, and directed by John Malkovich. Later in 1965, Wilson wrote and directed Miss Williams for a benefit performance at La MaMa called "BbAaNnGg!".

In 1965, Wilson's plays Home Free! and No Trespassing were produced for La MaMa Repertory Troupe's first European tour. His play This is the Rill Speaking was produced alongside Jean-Claude van Itallie's War and Rochelle Owens' Homo for La MaMa Repertory Troupe's second European tour, in 1966. His play Untitled was produced with work by Sam Shepard, Tom Eyen, Leonard Melfi, Paul Foster, and Owens, all directed by Tom O'Horgan, for La MaMa Repertory Troupe's third European tour, in 1967. In addition to writing his own plays at La MaMa, Wilson did set design for work by other playwrights. In 1966, he designed the set for Foster's The Madonna in the Orchard, directed by O'Horgan at La MaMa. He then designed the set for Donald Julian's In Praise of Folly, directed by Mason at La MaMa in 1969.

Wilson's play The Sand Castle was first produced at La MaMa in 1965, as directed by Mason, and was again directed by Mason at La MaMa in 1967. Wilson participated in the inaugural National Playwrights Conference in 1965 at the Eugene O'Neill Theater Center along with Sam Shepard, Edward Albee, and John Guare. His 1966 play The Rimers of Eldritch addressed hypocrisy and narrow-mindedness in a small town in the rural Midwest and won the 1966/1967 Drama Desk Vernon Rice Award for contribution to off-Broadway theatre. It was first produced at La MaMa in 1966, under Wilson's direction. Wilson directed a revival of The Rimers of Eldritch at La MaMa in 1981 in celebration of the theater's 20-year anniversary.

The Rimers of Eldritch was followed by The Gingham Dog (1968) about the breakup of an interracial couple. He returned to the O'Neill Theater Center to develop Lemon Sky in 1968. Wilson described Lemon Sky (1968) as "directly autobiographical". The play's narrator Alan, Wilson's representation of himself, describes his attempt to reconcile with his long-absent father. They fail to meet each other's expectations, and Alan leaves disillusioned by his father's authoritarianism and narrow-mindedness.

== Circle Repertory Company and later work (1969–2011) ==
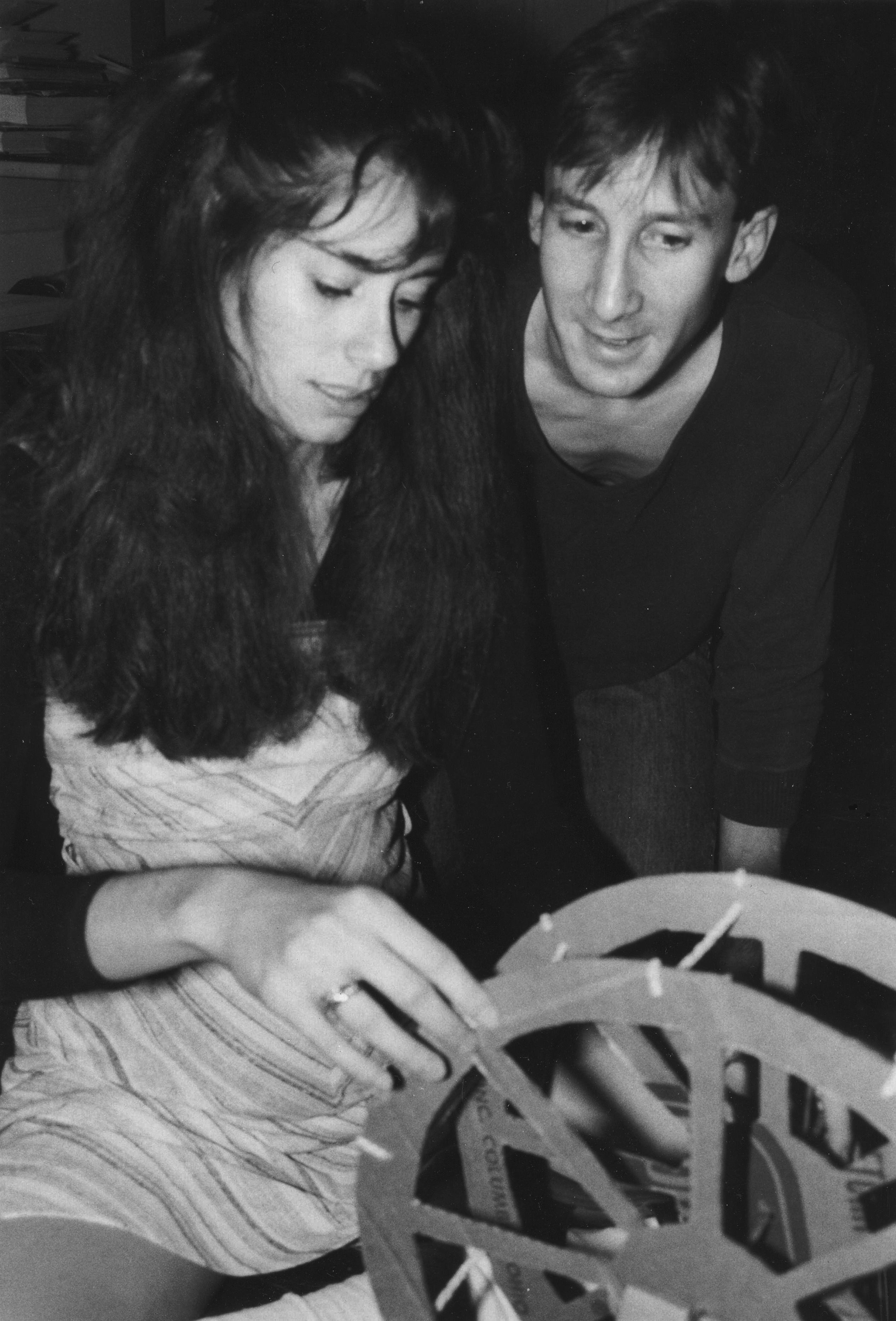
A scene from the 1986 New York revival of Home Free!

In 1969, Wilson co-founded the Circle Repertory Company with Marshall W. Mason, Tanya Berezin, and Rob Thirkield. Many of Wilson's plays were first produced at the Circle Repertory and directed by Mason. Also in 1969, Wilson was hired for $5,000 to adapt Tennessee Williams' short story One Arm, about a male hustler, into a screenplay. The day after he finished the screenplay, he was invited to a preview of Midnight Cowboy, and after seeing the film thought "there went that idea down the drain".

His first plays at Circle Repertory, The Great Nebula in Orion, Ikke, Ikke, Nye, Nye, Nye, and The Family Continues, premiered in 1972. The Hot l Baltimore, about lowlifes who face eviction when the decaying hotel in which they live is to be demolished, opened in 1973 and was Circle Repertory's first commercial success. The play also won the New York Drama Critics' Circle Award and an Obie Award. It then transferred off-Broadway to the Circle in the Square Theatre and ran for 1,166 performances. The Hot l Baltimore was adapted into a short-lived television series by ABC in 1975, which Wilson pronounced "a disaster".

In 1974, Wilson acted in Circle Repertory's production of E. E. Cummings' Him under the direction of Marshal Oglesby. In 1975, Wilson's The Mound Builders, which The New York Times described as Wilson's "most ambitious work", premiered at Circle Rep. The play concerned an ill-fated archeological dig in the Midwest, and, thematically, contemplated the futility of man's achievements. Circle Repertory then produced Wilson's Serenading Louie in 1976. The play had been unsuccessfully performed in 1970 by the Washington Theater Club, and Wilson revised it for Circle Repertory's production, which is generally regarded as its official premiere.

Sexual identity is among the themes that Wilson explored in his plays. The theme appears in The Madness of Lady Bright, Lemon Sky, Fifth of July, and Burn This. In Fifth of July, a Broadway hit in 1980–1982, members of the Talley family decide whether to sell the family farmhouse in Missouri. The story centers on Ken Talley, a disabled Vietnam veteran, and his lover Jed, who are living in the house. Wilson was nominated for the Tony Award for Best Play for Fifth of July. After Fifth of July, Wilson wrote Talley's Folly (1979), a two-person play depicting the Midwesterner Sally Talley and Jewish Matt Friedman falling in love and become engaged despite the objections of Sally's narrow-minded family. Talley & Son premiered as A Tale Told in 1981 but was rewritten and renamed when it opened in 1985. Both are prequels set 30 years prior to Fifth of July. Talley's Folly was awarded the Pulitzer Prize for Drama in 1980 and received a nomination for the Tony Award for Best Play. Around this time, Norman Mailer asked Wilson to adapt The Executioner's Song for a television movie, but Wilson declined.

Angels Fall opened on Broadway in 1983, earning Wilson his third nomination for the Tony Award for Best Play. The New York Times review said, "Mr. Wilson is one of the few artists in our theater who can truly make America sing." In Burn This, a young gay dancer named Robbie and his lover Dom have died in a boating accident before the play begins. Robbie's roommates, his dance partner Anna and the gay, confident Larry, must come to terms with Robbie's death. Anna learns to be independent and self-confident, pursuing her interest in choreography, beginning a relationship with Robbie's grieving brother Pale, and ending her dispassionate relationship with her longtime boyfriend.

In addition to writing plays, Wilson wrote the libretti for several operas. He collaborated with composer Lee Hoiby for Summer and Smoke (1971) and adapted his own play, This is the Rill Speaking, in 1992. Summer and Smoke is an adaptation of Tennessee Williams' play of the same name. Williams gave Hoiby permission to compose an opera based on the play, and Hoiby asked Wilson to adapt the play into a libretto. This is the Rill Speaking is a one-act chamber opera that Wilson adapted from his own play of the same name. In 1984, Wilson wrote a new translation of Anton Chekhov's Three Sisters for the Hartford Stage Company. Wilson attempted to make his translation sound like everyday speech, as he believed that existing translations were linguistically accurate but not inherently theatrical. Reviews of the Hartford production and a subsequent production by the Steppenwolf Theater Company praised Wilson's idiomatic dialogue.

He also became active with the Bay Street Theatre in Sag Harbor, where some of his new short plays were produced, including the 1996 world premiere of his comedy Virgil Is Still the Frogboy, commissioned by the Bay Street Theatre and underwritten by Vanity Fair magazine. The title refers to a famous graffiti spray-painted on a railroad bridge that had puzzled people in the Hamptons for years. Directed by Marshall W. Mason, the production starred Arija Bareiikis, Bobby Cannavale, Jennifer Dundas, Thomas McCarthy, and Josh Pais, running from August 14 to September 9, 1996.

== Personal life and death ==
Wilson was openly gay. After moving to New York City in 1962, he settled in an apartment on Sheridan Square in Greenwich Village, where he lived for many years. In the 1970s, he bought a house in Sag Harbor, Long Island. He lived in both places, using his Manhattan apartment primarily when he had a play in production there. When living in Manhattan, he worked with Playwrights Laboratory at the Circle Repertory Company, often attending readings, rehearsals, and productions.

Around 1998, Wilson gave up his apartment in New York to live full-time in Sag Harbor.

Wilson died on March 24, 2011, aged 73, from complications of pneumonia.

== Awards, recognition, and legacy ==
In 1995, he received the Golden Plate Award of the American Academy of Achievement.

In 2004, Wilson received the PEN/Laura Pels International Foundation for Theater Award for a Master American Dramatist. Also in 2004, he was elected to the American Academy of Arts and Letters.

In 2009, he shared insights about his friendship with Tennessee Williams at a theatre festival in Provincetown, Massachusetts.

In 2010, Debra Monk presented Wilson with the Artistic Achievement Award from the New York Innovative Theatre Awards. This honor was awarded by the off-off-Broadway community "in recognition of his brave and unique works that helped establish the off-off-Broadway community and propel the independent theatre voice as an important contributor to the American stage."

Ben Brantley, theatre critic for The New York Times, has said that Wilson's plays reflect "disenchantment with the state of the nation...A couple plays, at least, featured embittered Vietnam veterans. At the same time, he harked back to the era of more sentimental plays – of portraits of losers on the margins of life." Wilson and Marshall W. Mason encouraged method acting and often used Constantin Stanislavski's technique. In addition to John Malkovich, Judd Hirsch, Swoosie Kurtz, William Hurt, Jeff Daniels, David Morse, and Christopher Reeve were among the actors who starred in Wilson and Mason's productions.

== Selected works ==
- Home Free! (1964)
- The Madness of Lady Bright (1964)
- Balm in Gilead (1965)
- Ludlow Fair (1965)
- Wandering (1966)
- The Rimers of Eldritch (1967)
- The Gingham Dog (1968) (Wilson's first Broadway production in 1969)
- Lemon Sky (1968)
- Sextet (Yes) (1969)
- Serenading Louie (1970)
- The Hot l Baltimore (1973)
- The Mound Builders (1975)
- Brontosaurus (1977)
- Fifth of July (1978; Broadway 1980–82)
- Talley's Folly (1979; Broadway 1980)
- A Tale Told (1981, later revised and renamed Talley & Son)
- Angels Fall (1982; Broadway 1983)
- Burn This (1986; Broadway 1987–88)
- A Betrothal (1986)
- A Poster of the Cosmos (1988)
- Abstinence (1989)
- Redwood Curtain (1992; Broadway 1993; TV 1995)
- A Sense of Place (1996)
- Sympathetic Magic (1998)
- Book of Days (2000)
- Rain Dance (2002)

Cesear's Forum, Cleveland's minimalist theatre company, presented Lanford Wilson: Take 5, at Kennedy's Down Under, Playhouse Square in a September/October 2016 production. The five plays consisted of: Wandering , Sextet (Yes), A Betrothal, Brontosaurus, and A Poster of the Cosmos.

== Notes ==
=== Sources ===
- Barnett, Gene A. (1987). Lanford Wilson. Boston: Twayne Publishers. ISBN 0-8057-7498-X.
- Bryer, Jackson R., ed. (1994). Lanford Wilson: A Casebook. New York: Garland Publishers. ISBN 0-8240-0648-8.
- Busby, Mark (1987). Lanford Wilson. Boise, Idaho: Boise State University. ISBN 0-88430-080-3.
- Williams, Philip Middleton (1993). A Comfortable House: Lanford Wilson, Marshall W. Mason and the Circle Repertory Theatre. Jefferson, North Carolina: McFarland & Company, Inc. ISBN 0-89950-836-7.
