= Judd Hirsch =

American actor (born 1935)

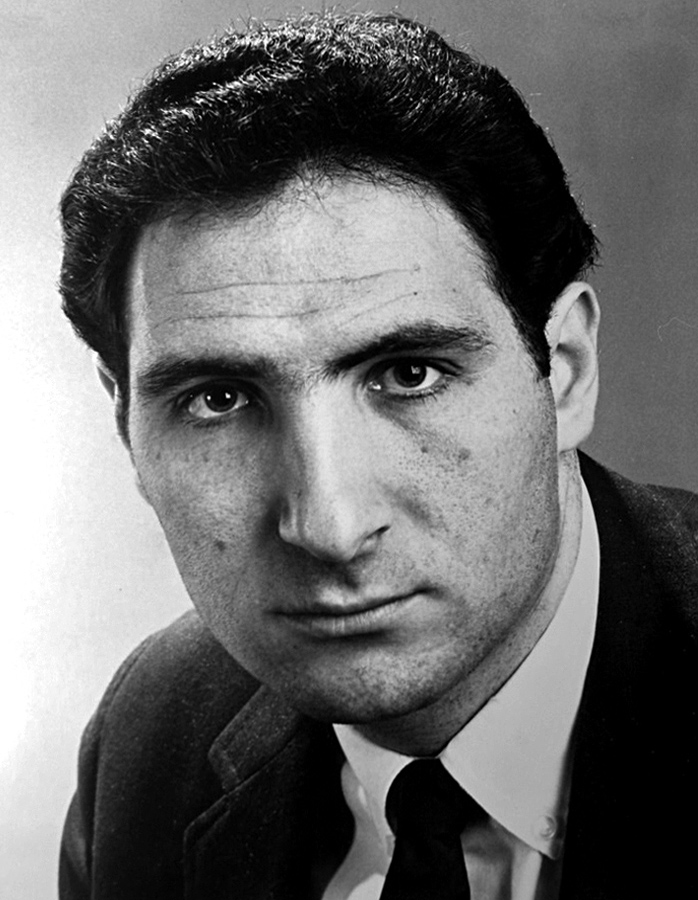
- Hirsch in 1967
- Born: Judd Seymore Hirsch; March 15, 1935 (age 91); New York City, U.S.
- Education: City College of New York (BS); American Academy of Dramatic Arts
- Occupation: Actor
- Years active: 1959–present
- Spouses: Elisa Sadaune (m. 1963; div. 1967) Bonni Sue Chalkin (m. 1992; div. 2005) Kathryn Danielle (m. 2020)
- Children: 3

Judd Seymore Hirsch (born March 15, 1935) is an American actor. He is known for playing Alex Rieger on the television comedy series Taxi (1978–1983), John Lacey on the NBC series Dear John (1988–1992), and Alan Eppes on the CBS series Numb3rs (2005–2010).

He is also well known for his career in theatre and for his roles in films such as Without a Trace (1983), Teachers (1984), Independence Day (1996) and its sequel Independence Day: Resurgence (2016), A Beautiful Mind (2001), Tower Heist (2011), Altered Minds (2013), The Meyerowitz Stories (2017), and Hollywood Stargirl (2022).

Hirsch has twice won the Primetime Emmy Award for Outstanding Lead Actor in a Comedy Series, has twice won the Tony Award for Best Actor in a Play, has won the Golden Globe Award for Best Actor in a Television Series – Musical or Comedy, and was nominated twice for the Academy Award for Best Supporting Actor for his performances in Ordinary People (1980) and The Fabelmans (2022).

== Early life and education ==
Hirsch was born on March 15, 1935, in the Bronx, New York, to Sally (née Kitzis) (1903–1999) and Joseph Sidney Hirsch (1904–1989), an electrician. Joseph was born in New York, to a German Jewish father, Benjamin Hirsch, and an English-born mother, Rosa Hirsch Benjamin, whose family were Dutch Jews. Sally Hirsch was born in Russia, also to a Jewish family. Judd Hirsch has a brother named Roland.

He grew up in both Brooklyn and the Bronx and graduated from DeWitt Clinton High School (in the Bronx) in 1952. He earned a degree in physics from City College of New York.

After graduating from college, Hirsch served in the United States Army Reserve in 1958 at Fort Leonard Wood for six months as a surveyor. Next Hirsch worked as an engineer for Westinghouse before he found work in the theater. He studied acting at HB Studio in New York City. He graduated in 1962 from the American Academy of Dramatic Arts in New York City.

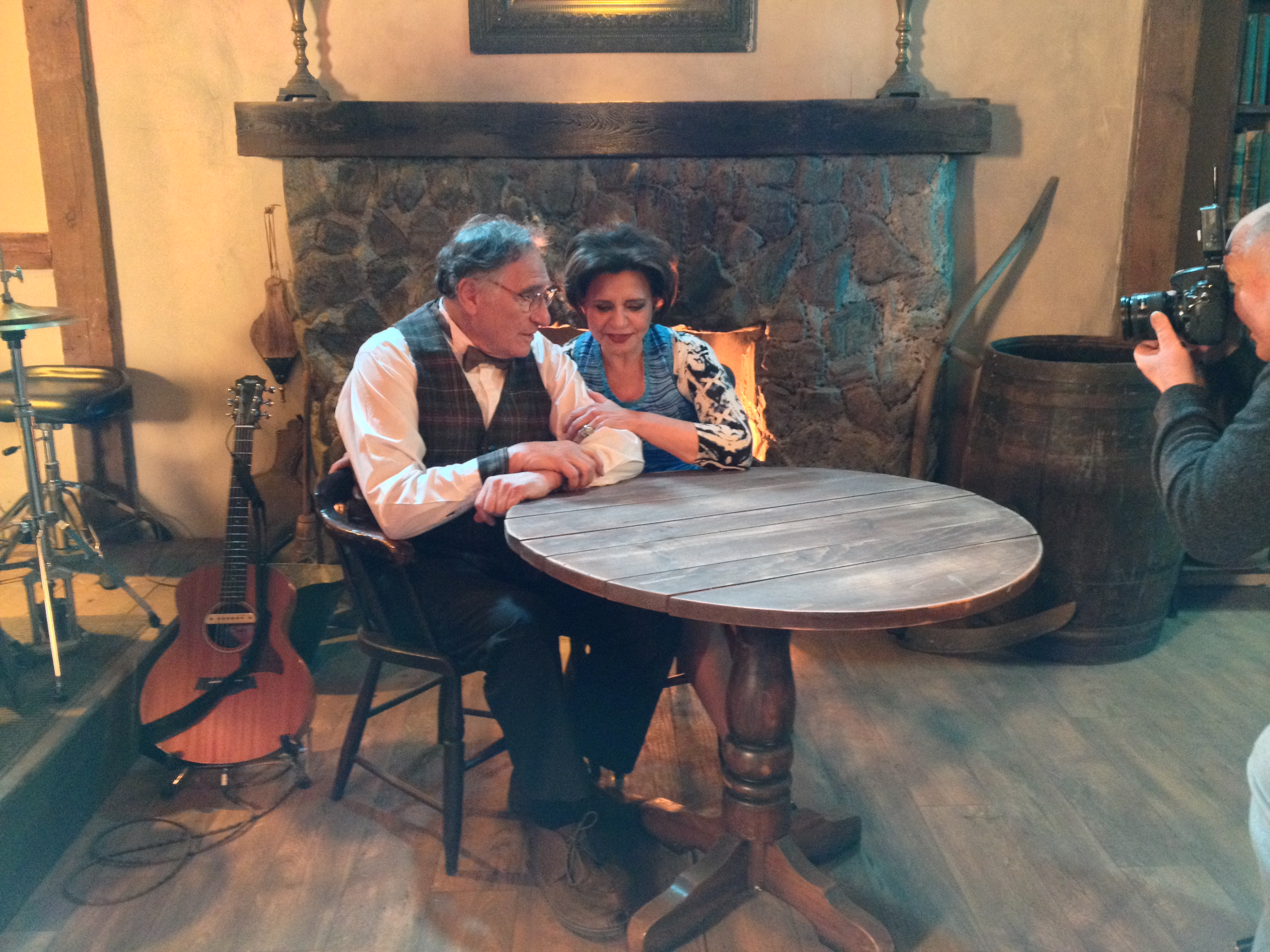
Starring with Kathryn Kates as the co-hosts of Small Miracles (2014), a series by Moshe Mones

== Career ==
The Los Angeles Times noted that Hirsch is "one of the very few actors who slips effortlessly from TV series to Broadway to feature films and back again, racking up awards and favorable reviews wherever he performs."

=== Film ===
Hirsch received a nomination for the Academy Award for Best Supporting Actor for his role in Ordinary People (1980), which won the Academy Award for Best Picture that year. His other film performances from the decade include leading roles in the 1983 drama Without a Trace, the 1984 dramedies, Teachers and The Goodbye People, and the 1988 drama Running on Empty, directed by Sidney Lumet and co-starring River Phoenix. In 1996, Hirsch portrayed the father of Jeff Goldblum's character in the blockbuster Independence Day, a role that he later reprised in its 2016 sequel. In 2001, he played a Princeton University professor in the Academy Award–winning film A Beautiful Mind. Hirsch has more recently had supporting roles in acclaimed films such as The Meyerowitz Stories (2017) and Uncut Gems (2019).

In 2023, at the age of 87, Hirsch became the second-oldest acting nominee for an Academy Award after being nominated for his role in Steven Spielberg's film The Fabelmans (2022). He also broke the record for the longest gap between Oscar nominations.

=== Television ===
After appearing frequently on television in the 1970s, including one season (1976–1977) in the series Delvecchio, Hirsch gained stardom for his lead role of Alex Rieger in the popular sitcom Taxi, which ran from 1978 to 1983. For his performance in the series, Hirsch won the Emmy Award for Lead Actor In a Comedy Series in 1981 and 1983. In 1999, he reprised his role from Taxi for a brief moment in Man on the Moon, the biopic of his co-star from Taxi, Andy Kaufman (portrayed by Jim Carrey).

After Taxi, Hirsch played the title character on the modestly successful sitcom Dear John and in 1989 won a Golden Globe Award for Best Actor in a Television Series in a Comedy or Musical for this role. He later teamed up with Bob Newhart in the short-lived comedy George and Leo.

Hirsch co-starred on the CBS Television drama Numb3rs (2005–2010) as Alan Eppes, father of FBI agent Don Eppes (Rob Morrow) and Professor Charlie Eppes (David Krumholtz).

Hirsch has guest-starred on episodes of Warehouse 13, Studio 60 on the Sunset Strip, Law & Order: Special Victims Unit, God Friended Me, and The Whole Truth (he reunited with Numb3rs co-star Rob Morrow), among others and lent his voice to the animated programs Tom Goes to the Mayor and American Dad! Hirsch has also appeared several times on the television show Maron as comedian Marc Maron's father; he has had a recurring role on The Goldbergs, playing the father of Jeff Garlin's character. In 2016, Hirsch appeared on the CBS comedy series The Big Bang Theory portraying Alfred Hofstadter, the father of Johnny Galecki's character, Leonard.

From 2014 to 2015, Hirsch appeared as a series regular on the ABC television series Forever. From 2017 to 2018, Hirsch starred in the short-lived CBS comedy Superior Donuts which lasted two seasons.

In early 2020, Hirsch appeared in a scene as the historic Simon Wiesenthal, in season 1, episode 8, of the Amazon Prime Video show Hunters, which stars Al Pacino.

In 2025, he appeared alongside Linda Lavin in Mid-Century Modern, her final onscreen role before her death.

His most recent performance was in April 2026 when, at age 91, he appeared on the 2-part season 2 finale of the FOX medical drama Doc entitled "Stuck/Happy Birthday." Hirsch played "Herman Zweig, a Holocaust survivor with an infectious zest for life and comes to Westside on the day of his 90th birthday for routine treatment… but when tragedy strikes and the hospital suddenly goes on lockdown, his optimism will be put to the test."

=== Theatre ===
Hirsch won the Tony Award for Best Performance by a Leading Actor in a Play for his work in Conversations with My Father, a Herb Gardner play. Other noteworthy stage performances include The Hot l Baltimore, Talley's Folly, and his starring role in I'm Not Rappaport, for which Hirsch also won a Tony Award in 1986.

== Personal life ==
Hirsch was married to his first wife, Elisa Sadaune, from 1963 to 1967. Their son, Alex Hirsch, was born in 1966. Hirsch married Bonni Sue Chalkin, a fashion designer, in a Jewish ceremony on December 24, 1992. They subsequently divorced in 2005. From this second marriage, Hirsch has a daughter, Montana, and a son, London. Hirsch is currently married to his third wife, actress, Kathryn Danielle Hirsch.

== Filmography ==
Film
| Year | Title | Role | Notes |
|---|---|---|---|
| 1971 | Jump | Unknown | Uncredited |
| 1973 | Serpico | Cop | Uncredited |
| 1978 | King of the Gypsies | Groffo | |
| 1980 | Ordinary People | Dr. Tyrone C. Berger | Nominated—Academy Award for Best Supporting Actor; Nominated—Golden Globe Award for Best Supporting Actor – Motion Picture |
| 1983 | Without a Trace | Detective Al Manetti | |
| 1984 | The Goodbye People | Arthur Korman | |
| 1984 | Teachers | Roger Rubell | |
| 1988 | Running on Empty | Arthur Pope/Paul Manfield | |
| 1996 | Independence Day | Julius Levinson | |
| 1999 | Out of the Cold | Leon Axelrod | |
| 1999 | Man on the Moon | Alex Rieger | Uncredited cameo |
| 2001 | A Beautiful Mind | Dr. Helinger | Nominated—Screen Actors Guild Award for Outstanding Performance by a Cast in a Motion Picture |
| 2004 | Zeyda and the Hitman | Gideon Schub | |
| 2006 | Brother's Shadow | Leo Groden | |
| 2011 | Tower Heist | Mr. Simon | |
| 2011 | The Muppets | Himself | Cameo |
| 2011 | This Must Be the Place | Mordecai Midler | |
| 2013 | Altered Minds | Dr. Nathan Shellner | |
| 2016 | Independence Day: Resurgence | Julius Levinson | |
| 2017 | The Meyerowitz Stories | L.J. Shapiro | |
| 2019 | Uncut Gems | Gooey | |
| 2020 | A Deadly Legend | Carl Turner | |
| 2021 | Burning at Both Ends | Bertrand | Known as Resistance: 1942 in some territories |
| 2022 | iMordecai | Mordecai Samel | |
| 2022 | Showing Up | Bill | |
| 2022 | Hollywood Stargirl | Mr. Mitchell | |
| 2022 | The Fabelmans | Boris Podgorny | AARP Movies for Grownups Award for Best Supporting Actor; Nominated—Academy Award for Best Supporting Actor; Nominated—Critics' Choice Movie Award for Best Supporting Actor; Nominated—Screen Actors Guild Award for Outstanding Performance by a Cast in a Motion Picture; Nominated—St. Louis Gateway Film Critics Association Award for Best Supporting Actor |
| 2024 | Rally Caps | Herb | |
| 2025 | Fantasy Life | Fred | |
| 2025 | Stay Forte | American hostage | |
| 2025 | The Best You Can | Warren Rand | |

Television
| Year | Title | Role | Notes |
|---|---|---|---|
| 1974 | The Law | Murray Stone | Television movie |
| 1975 | The Law | Murray Stone | 3 episodes |
| 1975 | Fear on Trial | Saul | Television movie |
| 1975 | Medical Story | Dr. Joe Dempsey | Episode: "Waste Land" |
| 1975 | The Legend of Valentino | Jack Auerbach | Television movie |
| 1976 | The Keegans | Lieutenant Marco Ciardi | Television movie |
| 1976 | Visions | Joe Morris | Episode: "Two Brothers" |
| 1977 | Rhoda | Mike | 2 episodes: "Rhoda Likes Mike"; "The Weekend"; Nominated—Primetime Emmy Award for Outstanding Lead Actor for a Single Appearance in a Drama or Comedy Series |
| 1976–1977 | Delvecchio | Sergeant Dominick Delvecchio | 21 episodes |
| 1978–1983 | Taxi | Alex Reiger | 114 episodes Primetime Emmy Award for Outstanding Lead Actor in a Comedy Series (1981, 1983); Nominated—Golden Globe Award for Best Actor in a Television Series – Musical or Comedy (1978–1982); Nominated—Primetime Emmy Award for Outstanding Lead Actor in a Comedy Series (1979–1980, 1982) |
| 1979 | Sooner or Later | Bob Walters | Television movie |
| 1979 | The Halloween That Almost Wasn't | Count Dracula | Television movie |
| 1980 | Marriage Is Alive and Well | Herb Rollie | Television movie |
| 1980 | The Last Resort | Dr. Zegelman | Episode: "Zegelmania" |
| 1981 | The Robert Klein Show | Unknown | Television movie |
| 1984 | Lights: The Miracle of Chanukah | Narrator (voice) | Animated short Television movie |
| 1985 | Detective in the House | Press Wyman | 6 episodes |
| 1985 | First Steps | Dr. Jerrold Petrofsky | Television movie |
| 1985 | Brotherly Love | Ben Ryder/Harry Brand | Television movie |
| 1988–1992 | Dear John | John Lacey | 90 episodes Golden Globe Award for Best Actor in a Television Series – Musical or Comedy (1988); Nominated—Golden Globe Award for Best Actor in a Television Series – Musical or Comedy (1989) |
| 1988 | The Great Escape II: The Untold Story | Capt. David Matthews | Television movie |
| 1989 | PBS NOVA | Himself (Host/Narrator) | Episode: "The Hidden City" |
| 1990 | She Said No | Martin Knapek | Television movie |
| 1994 | Betrayal of Trust | Dr. Jules Masserman | Television movie |
| 1996 | Caroline in the City | Ben Karinsky | Episode: "Caroline and the Comic" |
| 1997 | Color of Justice | Sam Lind | Television movie |
| 1997–1998 | George and Leo | Leo Wagonman | 22 episodes |
| 1999 | Rocky Marciano | Al Weill | Television movie |
| 2000 | Welcome to New York | Dr. Bob | Episode: "Dr. Bob" |
| 2001 | Family Law | Daniel Bonner | Episode: "Security" |
| 2002 | Philly | Rabbi Nathan Wexler | Episode: "The Curse of the Klopman Diamonds" |
| 2003 | Law & Order: Special Victims Unit | Dr. Judah Platner | Episode: "Mercy" |
| 2003 | Regular Joe | Baxter Binder | 5 episodes; Also Producer |
| 2003 | Street Time | Shimi Goldman | Episode: "High Holly Roller" |
| 2003 | Law & Order: Criminal Intent | Ben Elkins | Episode: "Pravda" |
| 2003 | Who Killed the Federal Theatre | Narrator | Television movie |
| 2005 | Family Guy | Himself (voice) | Episode: "Blind Ambition" |
| 2006 | Tom Goes to the Mayor | Prisoner (voice) | Episode: "Spray a Carpet or Rug" |
| 2006 | Studio 60 on the Sunset Strip | Wes Mendell | Episode: "Pilot" |
| 2009 | American Dad! | Rabbi (voice) | 2 episodes |
| 2005–2010 | Numb3rs | Alan Eppes | 114 episodes |
| 2010 | Warehouse 13 | Isadore Weisfelt | Episode: "Secret Santa" |
| 2010 | The Whole Truth | Judge Wright | Episode: "Judicial Discretion" |
| 2011–2012 | Damages | Bill Herndon | 14 episodes |
| 2012 | The Good Wife | Judge Harrison Creary | Episode: "Here Comes the Judge" |
| 2013–2015 | Maron | Larry Maron | 4 episodes |
| 2014 | Sharknado 2: The Second One | Ben | Television movie |
| 2014–2015 | Forever | Abraham "Abe" Morgan | 22 episodes |
| 2014 | Small Miracles | Mort | 4 episodes |
| 2015–2023 | The Goldbergs | Ben "Pop-Pop" Goldberg | 22 episodes |
| 2016 | The Big Bang Theory | Dr. Alfred Hofstadter | 2 episodes |
| 2016 | Family Guy | Himself (voice) | Episode: "Take a Letter" |
| 2017–2018 | Superior Donuts | Arthur Przybyszewski | 34 episodes Also: Producer |
| 2018 | Law & Order: Special Victims Unit | Joseph Edelman | Episode: "Alta Kockers" |
| 2018 | Welcome to the Wayne | Himself (voice) | Episode: "Gimble in the Wabe" |
| 2019–2021 | Big Mouth | Lewis Glouberman (voice) | 3 episodes |
| 2019 | Modern Love | Cop, Vendor, Taxi Driver | Episode: "Take Me as I Am, Whoever I Am" |
| 2020 | God Friended Me | Abe | Episode: "A New Hope" |
| 2020–2023 | Hunters | Simon Wiesenthal | 3 episodes |
| 2020 | Cosmos: Possible Worlds | J. Robert Oppenheimer (voice) | Episode: "A Tale of Two Atoms" |
| 2023 | Extrapolations | David Goldblatt | Episode: "2047: The Fifth Question" |
| 2026 | Doc | Herman Zweig | Season 2, episodes: "Stuck", "Happy Birthday" |
| 2026 | Bob's Burgers | Rusty (voice) | Season 16, episode 12: "Children of the Carn" |

Theatre
| Year | Title | Role | Notes |
|---|---|---|---|
| 1963 | Barefoot in the Park | Telephone Man | |
| 1972–1973 | The Hot l Baltimore | Bill Lewis | Obie Award for Best Performance |
| 1976 | Knock Knock | Multiple roles | Drama Desk Award for Outstanding Featured Actor in a Play |
| 1977–1978 | Chapter Two | George Schneider | Nominated—Drama Desk Award for Outstanding Actor in a Play |
| 1980 | Talley's Folly | Matt Friedman | Nominated—Tony Award for Best Actor in a Play; Nominated—Drama Desk Award for Outstanding Actor in a Play |
| 1985–1988 | I'm Not Rappaport | Nat | Tony Award for Best Actor in a Play |
| 1992–1993 | Conversations with My Father | Eddie | Tony Award for Best Actor in a Play |
| 1996 | A Thousand Clowns | Murray Burns | |
| 1998–1999 | Art | Marc | |
| 2002 | I'm Not Rappaport | Nat | |
| 2004 | Sixteen Wounded | Hans | |

== Accolades ==
| Year | Award | Category | Nominated work | Results | Ref. |
|---|---|---|---|---|---|
| 1980 | Academy Awards | Best Supporting Actor | Ordinary People | Nominated | |
| 2022 | Academy Awards | Best Supporting Actor | The Fabelmans | Nominated | |
| 2022 | AARP Movies for Grownups Awards | Best Supporting Actor | The Fabelmans | Won | |
| 2011 | Beverly Hills Film Festival | Best Actor | Polish Bar | Won | |
| 2022 | Critics' Choice Movie Awards | Best Supporting Actor | The Fabelmans | Nominated | |
| 2022 | Denver Film Critics Society Awards | Best Supporting Actor | The Fabelmans | Nominated | |
| 1976 | Drama Desk Awards | Outstanding Featured Actor in a Play | Knock Knock | Won | |
| 1978 | Drama Desk Awards | Outstanding Actor in a Play | Chapter Two | Nominated | |
| 1980 | Drama Desk Awards | Outstanding Actor in a Play | Talley's Folly | Nominated | |
| 2022 | Georgia Film Critics Association Awards | Best Supporting Actor | The Fabelmans | Nominated | |
| 1978 | Golden Globe Awards | Best Actor in a Television Series – Musical or Comedy | Taxi | Nominated | |
| 1979 | Golden Globe Awards | Best Actor in a Television Series – Musical or Comedy | Taxi | Nominated | |
| 1980 | Golden Globe Awards | Best Actor in a Television Series – Musical or Comedy | Taxi | Nominated | |
| 1980 | Golden Globe Awards | Best Supporting Actor – Motion Picture | Ordinary People | Nominated | |
| 1981 | Golden Globe Awards | Best Actor in a Television Series – Musical or Comedy | Taxi | Nominated | |
| 1982 | Golden Globe Awards | Best Actor in a Television Series – Musical or Comedy | Taxi | Nominated | |
| 1988 | Golden Globe Awards | Best Actor in a Television Series – Musical or Comedy | Dear John | Won (Note: Tied with Michael J. Fox for Family Ties and Richard Mulligan for Empty Nest.) | |
| 1989 | Golden Globe Awards | Best Actor in a Television Series – Musical or Comedy | Dear John | Nominated | |
| 2014 | Indie Series Awards | Best Supporting Actor (Drama) | Small Miracles | Won | |
| 2022 | North Texas Film Critics Association Awards | Best Supporting Actor | The Fabelmans | Nominated | |
| 1979 | Obie Awards | Best Performance | Talley's Folly | Won | |
| 2022 | Palm Springs International Film Festival | Vanguard Award | The Fabelmans | Won | |
| 1978 | Primetime Emmy Awards | Outstanding Lead Actor for a Single Appearance in a Drama or Comedy Series | Rhoda (Episode: "Rhoda Likes Mike") | Nominated | |
| 1979 | Primetime Emmy Awards | Outstanding Lead Actor in a Comedy Series | Taxi | Nominated | |
| 1980 | Primetime Emmy Awards | Outstanding Lead Actor in a Comedy Series | Taxi | Nominated | |
| 1981 | Primetime Emmy Awards | Outstanding Lead Actor in a Comedy Series | Taxi | Won | |
| 1982 | Primetime Emmy Awards | Outstanding Lead Actor in a Comedy Series | Taxi | Nominated | |
| 1983 | Primetime Emmy Awards | Outstanding Lead Actor in a Comedy Series | Taxi | Won | |
| 2001 | Actor Awards | Outstanding Performance by a Cast in a Motion Picture | A Beautiful Mind | Nominated | |
| 2022 | Actor Awards | Outstanding Performance by a Cast in a Motion Picture | The Fabelmans | Nominated | |
| 2022 | St. Louis Film Critics Association Awards | Best Supporting Actor | The Fabelmans | Nominated | |
| 2022 | Sunset Film Circle Awards | Scene Stealer | The Fabelmans | Nominated | |
| 1980 | Tony Awards | Best Leading Actor in a Play | Talley's Folly | Nominated | |
| 1986 | Tony Awards | Best Leading Actor in a Play | I'm Not Rappaport | Won | |
| 1992 | Tony Awards | Best Leading Actor in a Play | Conversations with My Father | Won | |
