= John Lee Beatty =

American scenic designer

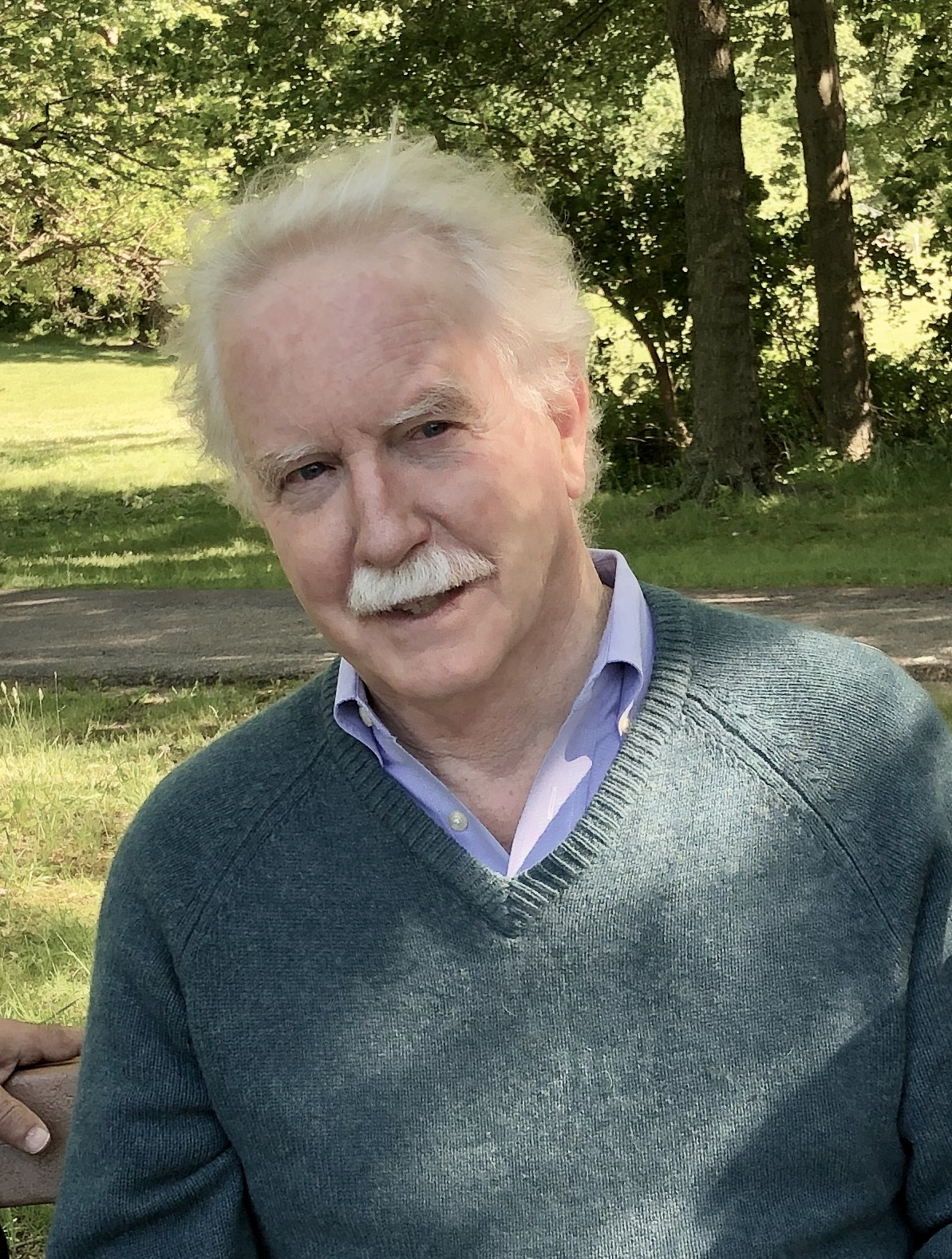
- Born: Palo Alto, California, U.S.
- Education: Brown University (BA), Yale School of Drama
- Occupation: Scenic designer

John Lee Beatty is an American scenic designer who has created set designs for more than 115 Broadway shows and has designed for other productions. He won two Tony Awards, for Talley's Folly (1980) and The Nance (2013), was nominated for 13 more, and he won five Drama Desk Awards and was nominated for 10 others.

== Life and career ==
Beatty was born in Palo Alto, California and grew up in Claremont. His father was dean of students at Pomona College and his mother had also worked in academia. While he was an English major at Brown University, he also directed, wrote, acted, designed sets and costumes, and silkscreened posters for college productions. After graduating from Brown, he entered the Yale School of Drama where he was trained by Ming Cho Lee, and scenic artist Arnold Abramson; as well as by visiting lecturers Donald Oenslager, Jo Mielziner, and Boris Aronson.

In the early 1970s Beatty was the set designer for the Wayside Theatre in Middletown, Virginia, where he also presented a puppet show called "Puppet Personalities". In New York, he began his theatre career as an assistant to Douglas Schmidt. He joined the Circle Repertory Company and then designed the sets for his first Broadway show, Knock Knock (by Jules Feiffer) in 1976. Since then, he has designed sets for more than 115 Broadway productions, including Heartbreak House, Rabbit Hole, The Color Purple, Crimes of the Heart, The Odd Couple, Doubt, Who's Afraid of Virginia Woolf?, Twentieth Century, Wonderful Town, Dinner at Eight, Morning's at Seven, Proof, Footloose, Ivanov, The Little Foxes, Once Upon a Mattress, Chicago, A Delicate Balance, The Heiress, Redwood Curtain, A Small Family Business, The Most Happy Fella, Ain't Misbehavin', The Octette Bridge Club, Duet for One, Fifth of July, Talley's Folly, The Innocents, Other Desert Cities, Penn & Teller, After Midnight, Disgraced and Sweat.

He also has designed for Off-Broadway shows, many regional theaters, film, television and circus.

== Awards and honors ==
Beatty won two Tony Awards for his designs for Talley's Folly (1980) and The Nance (2013). He won five Drama Desk Awards for his designs for Talley's Folly (1979), Talley's Folly (1980), Fifth of July (1981), Dinner at Eight (2003) and Twentieth Century (2004). He has won two Obie Awards for Set Design (1975, 2005).

He has received 13 other Tony Award nominations, for Fifth of July (1981), A Small Family Business (1992), Redwood Curtain (1993), The Heiress (1995), A Delicate Balance (1996), The Little Foxes (1997), Morning's at Seven (2002), Dinner at Eight (2003), Doubt (2005), Rabbit Hole (2006), The Color Purple (2006), The Royal Family (2010) and Other Desert Cities (2012). He received ten other Drama Desk nominations.

He received seven Henry Hewes Design Award, Scenic Designs, including for The Whipping Man at the City Center Stage 1 (2011). He won four Outer Critics Circle Awards, including for Talley’s Folly and Hide and Seek.

He received a Special Citation from the New York Drama Critics' Circle in 2013 for career excellence in scenic design, won five Los Angeles Drama Critics Circle Awards, and two Joseph Jefferson Awards given for Scenic Design in theatre in Chicago.

He was inducted into the American Theater Hall of Fame in January 2003.

== Teaching ==
He has taught at Brooklyn College, North Carolina School of the Arts, Brandeis, and Yale.
