= Disgraced =

2012 play by Ayad Akhtar

- Written by: Ayad Akhtar
- Subject: Pakistani Muslim heritage, Islamophobia
- Genre: Drama

Premiere
- Date: January 2012
- Place: American Theater Company, Chicago, Illinois, USA

Disgraced (2012) is the first stage play by playwright, novelist, and screenwriter Ayad Akhtar. It premiered in Chicago and has had Off-Broadway and Off West End engagements. The play, which won the 2013 Pulitzer Prize for Drama, opened on Broadway at the Lyceum Theater on October 23, 2014. Disgraced has also been recognized with a 2012 Joseph Jefferson Award for New Work – Play or Musical and a 2013 Obie Award for Playwriting. The 2014 Broadway transfer earned a nomination for the Tony Award for Best Play in 2015.

The 90-minute play, in one act, is centered on sociopolitical themes such as Islamophobia and the self-identity of Muslim-American citizens. It explores a dinner party among four people with very different backgrounds. As discussion turns to politics and religion, the mood quickly becomes heated. Described as a "combustible powder keg of identity politics," the play depicts racial and ethnic prejudices that "secretly persist in even the most progressive cultural circles." It also depicts the challenge for upwardly mobile Muslim Americans in post-9/11 America. Productions have included performances by Aasif Mandvi and Erik Jensen.

== Plot ==
Lawyer Amir Kapoor and his wife Emily host a dinner in their Upper East Side apartment in New York. Amir is an American-born, Muslim-raised lawyer, who works on Manhattan mergers and acquisitions. Emily is an up-and-coming artist who focuses on Islamic themes in her art. Amir has cast aside much of his Muslim heritage for the sake of his career and serves as Emily's muse. She has an affinity for Islamic artistic traditions.

Prior to the dinner, Amir, who is on the partner track, has become involved in a controversial case. Amir's assimilated nephew, Abe (born Hussein Malik), has concerns regarding the propriety of the arrest of a local imam who is imprisoned on charges that may be trumped-up of financing terrorist-supporting groups. Amir questions whether it is religious persecution. Emily encourages the reluctant Amir to appear in court in support of the imam; although he is in an unofficial capacity, his name is mentioned in The New York Times.

The case becomes dinner conversation when Amir hosts Jory, a colleague from work, and her Jewish husband, Isaac, who is Emily's art dealer. In all, the dinner table assembly includes an ex-Muslim, an African American, a Jew and a WASP discussing the topic of religious faith. The conversation touches upon "Islamic and Judaic tradition, the Quran and the Talmud, racial profiling and September 11 and the Taliban and Mahmoud Ahmadinejad and Benjamin Netanyahu" as tensions mount.

When Amir admits he felt a "blush of pride" on September 11, and holds secret animosity toward Israel, his friends are disgusted. Jory and Amir leave the apartment to get a bottle of champagne. It is revealed that Isaac and Emily have had an affair in the past, and that he is secretly in love with her. Jory and Amir return just as Isaac is about to kiss Emily.

It is revealed that Jory has been selected as partner in the law firm over Amir, in part because he attended the imam's trial. Enraged, Amir discredits Jory using an ethnic slur. Jory and Isaac depart, with the status of their relationship uncertain following the revelation of Isaac's infidelity. When Emily confesses her affair with Isaac, Amir beats her. Abe stumbles into the apartment and finds his uncle standing over her.

The play jumps ahead a period of time. Amir is packing his belongings and preparing to leave the apartment. Emily brings Abe over for legal advice. He was questioned by the FBI after his friend expressed a jihadist sentiment at a Starbucks cafe. Amir warns Abe to be more cautious, but Abe blows up, saying that the West has "disgraced" Islam, but that they will take it all back one day. He storms out. Amir tries to reconcile with Emily, but she leaves.

== Cast and characters ==
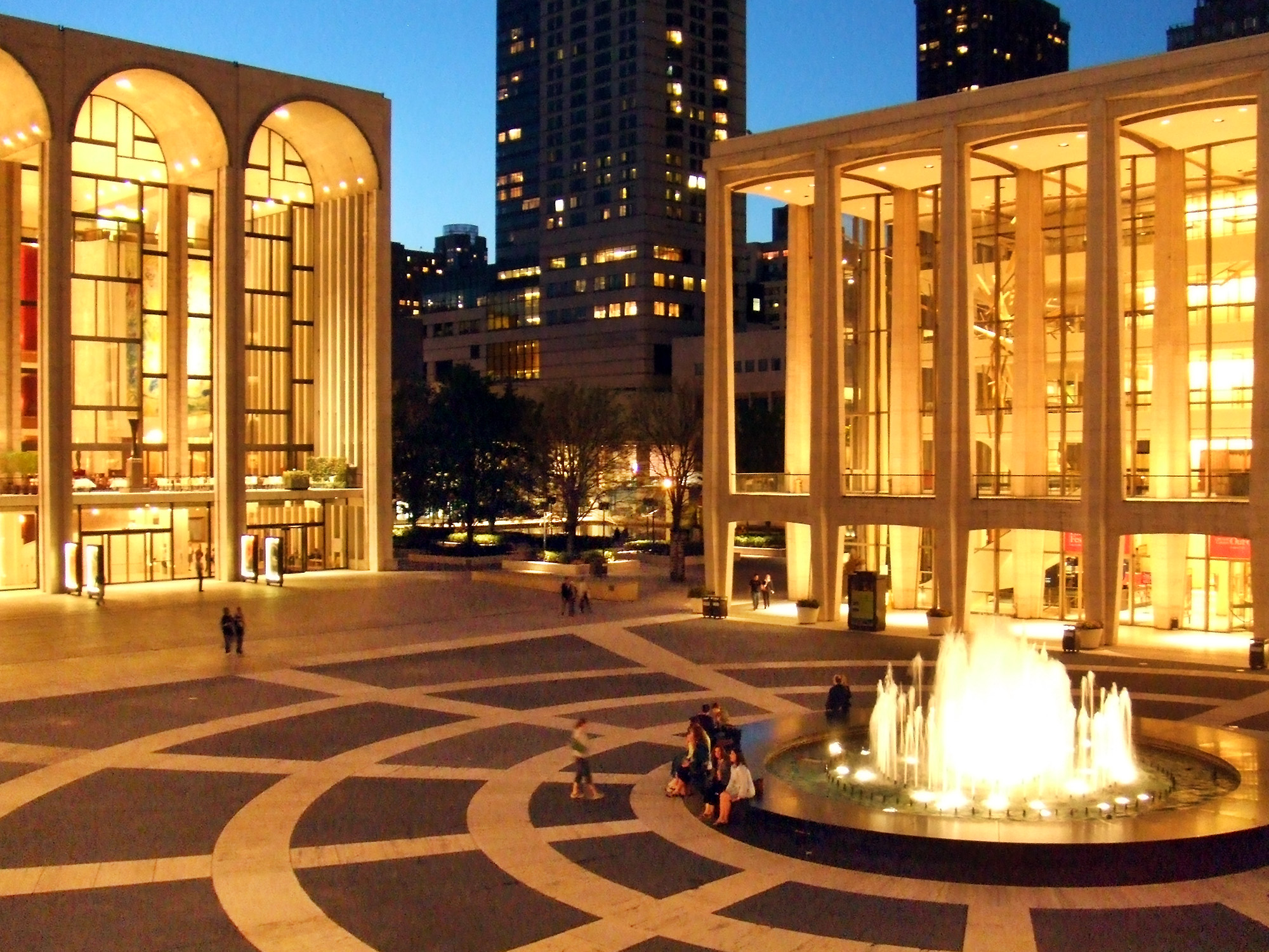
Disgraced made its Off-Broadway debut at Lincoln Center.

On November 2, 2011, the Chicago cast was announced. Usman Ally played Amir, Alana Arenas played Jory, Behzad Dabu played Abe, Benim Foster played Isaac, and Lee Stark played Emily. Previews started on January 27, 2012, and the official debut was on January 30. The Chicago production creative team included set designer Jack Magaw, lighting designer Christine Binder, costume designer Janice Pytel, prop designer Nick Heggestad, sound designer Kevin O’Donnell, fight choreographer David Woolley, and production stage manager Katie Klemme.

On July 26, 2012, the Off-Broadway cast was announced: Aasif Mandvi, Heidi Armbruster, Adam Dannheisser, Omar Maskati and Karen Pittman. At the time, Mandvi was a correspondent for Comedy Central's The Daily Show with Jon Stewart. Other creative team members were sets designer Lauren Helpern, costume designer Dane Laffrey, lighting designer Tyler Micoleau, and sound designer Jill BC DuBoff. The show began previews with Dannheisser on October 7, but Erik Jensen replaced him on October 10 after an illness, with opening night scheduled for October 22. Kimberly Senior directed both productions at the American Theater Company in Chicago and at LCT3/Lincoln Center Theater in New York. She was also set to direct the Broadway run in 2014.

The New York production opened at the Claire Tow Theater at Lincoln Center in New York on October 22, 2012, with the following cast: Heidi Armbruster as Emily, Erik Jensen as Isaac, Aasif Mandvi as Amir, Omar Maskati as Abe, and Karen Pittman as Jory. The Off West End cast, which was directed by Nadia Fall, consisted of Danny Ashok, Kirsty Bushell, Hari Dhillon, Sara Powell and Nigel Whitmey.

The Broadway production was originated by Hari Dhillon and Danny Ashok reprising their Off West End roles as Amir and Abe, respectively, Karen Pittman reprising her Off-Broadway role as Jory, and Josh Radnor reprising as Isaac and Gretchen Mol as Emily. Kimberly Senior, who directed the Chicago and Off-Broadway productions signed on to direct. She was joined on the creative team by John Lee Beatty (set), Jennifer von Mayrhauser (costumes), Ken Posner (lighting) and Jill DuBoff (sound).

The following tables show the casts of the principal original productions:

Role	American Theater 2012	Lincoln Center 2012	Bush 2014	Lyceum 2014
Amir Kapoor	Usman Ally	Aasif Mandvi	Hari Dhillon	Hari Dhillon
Jory	Alana Arenas	Karen Pittman	Sara Powell	Karen Pittman
Isaac	Benim Foster	Erik Jensen	Nigel Whitmey	Josh Radnor
Emily	Lee Stark	Heidi Armbruster	Kirsty Bushell	Gretchen Mol
Abe	Behzad Dabu	Omar Maskati	Danny Ashok	Danny Ashok

== Production history ==
Theatre	Opening Date	Closing Date	Perfs.	Details
American Theater Company, Chicago	January 30, 2012	March 11, 2012	?	Premiere production
Lincoln Center, Off-Broadway	October 22, 2012	December 23, 2012	?	Off-Broadway debut
Bush Theatre, Off West End	May 22, 2014	June 22, 2014	?	Off West End debut
Lyceum Theatre, Broadway	October 23, 2014	March 1, 2015	149	Broadway debut
Theater Drachengasse, Vienna, Austria	February 9, 2015	February 21, 2015	?	Continental Europe Premiere
Goodman Theatre, Chicago	September 12, 2015	October 25, 2015	?	
Long Wharf Theatre, New Haven	October 14, 2015	November 8, 2015	?	
Berkeley Repertory Theatre	November 6, 2015	December 27, 2015	?	
Seattle Repertory Theatre	January 8, 2016	February 6, 2016	?	
Mirvish Productions, Toronto, Canada	April 3, 2016	April 24, 2016	?	
Arena Stage, Washington DC	April 22, 2016	May 29, 2016	?	
The English Theatre Frankfurt	March 4, 2016	May 1, 2016	50	Germany English language debut
McCarter Theatre	October 11, 2016	October 30, 2016	?	New Jersey debut
Magnus Theatre, Thunder Bay	October 31, 2016	November 12, 2016	?	

== Themes ==
National Public Radio describes the play thematically as one that "tackles Islamophobia and questions of Muslim-American identity". Isherwood noted: "As two couples exchange observations about faith and politics in the modern world, the intellectual thickets they find themselves in become increasingly tangled." More specifically he said, it is a play "about thorny questions of identity and religion in the contemporary world, with an accent on the incendiary topic of how radical Islam and the terrorism it inspires have affected the public discourse." Kapoor has "rejected his Muslim upbringing (and even his surname) to better assimilate into his law firm, but he still feels the occasional tug of Islam". Geier wrote: "Disgraced offers an engaging snapshot of the challenge for upwardly mobile Islamic Americans in the post-9/11 age." According to The Guardian's Stephen Moss, the play comes to a head as the protagonist "tries to come to terms with his multiple identity – American v Asian, Muslim v secularist, passive observer of injustice v activist". Although Amir has an affinity for $600 shirts with obscenely high thread counts, his home dinner party is set in his apartment which is "spare and tasteful with subtle flourishes of the Orient".

During interviews following the Pulitzer announcement, Akhtar said that the play's title has both a literal and a metaphorical meaning. Literally, Amir plays out his disgrace in almost real time before the audience. Metaphorically, Akhtar says "There are ways that the colonial history of the West is still playing out in the Muslim world. The events that comprise that history — a disgrace of native peoples, as it were — is still very much a part of our contemporary moment."

== About the author ==
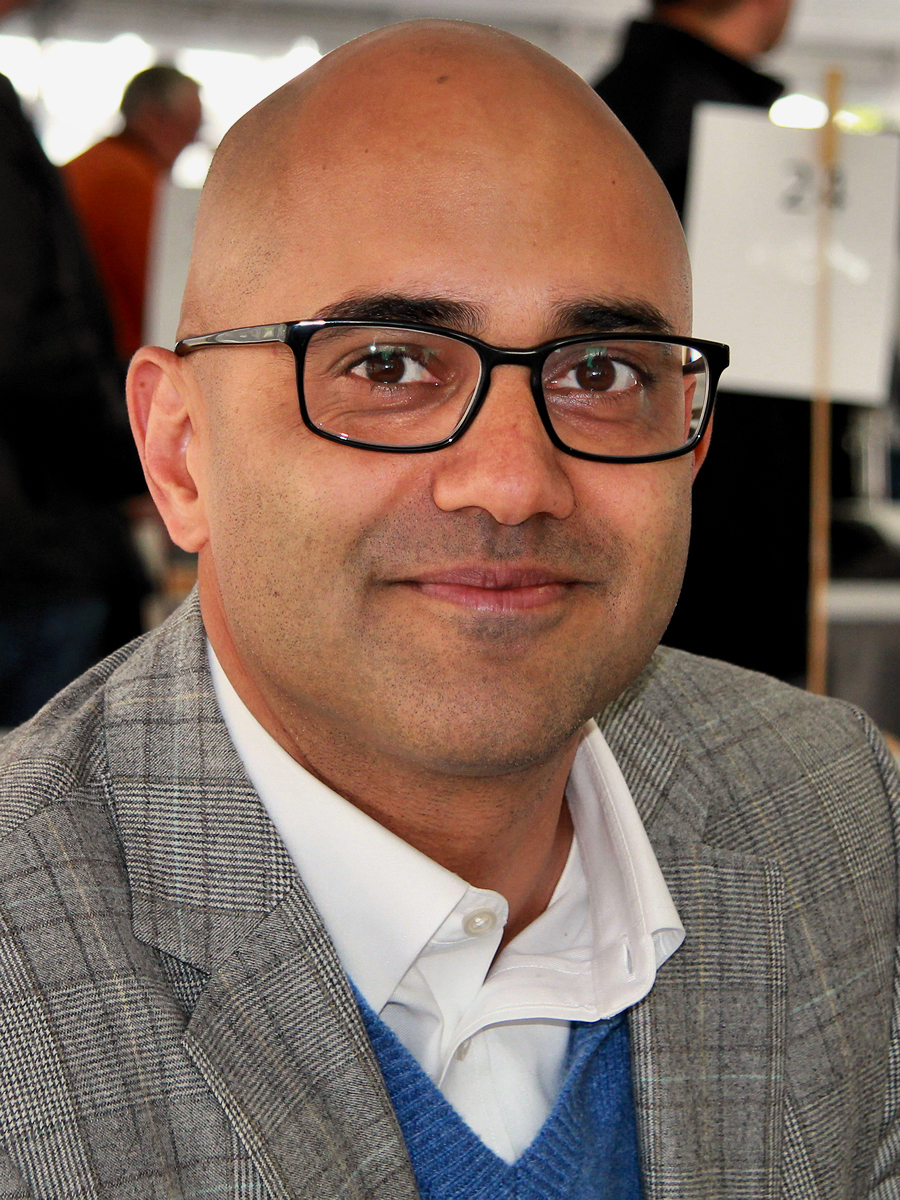
Ayad Akhtar won the 2013 Pulitzer Prize for Drama for Disgraced.

Akhtar is a first generation Pakistani-American born in New York City and raised in Milwaukee. He had previously written and starred in the film The War Within (2005), in which he portrayed a Pakistani engineering student who became a terrorist. He studied at Brown University and Columbia University. His debut novel was American Dervish (2012), which studies "the Muslim religious experience in America".

The son of immigrant doctors, Akhtar had spent a decade exploring dual identity before writing this play. Akhtar decided to write from his own experiences. He said that, at a metaphorical level, in order to write this play he had to "turn and look over my shoulder at what I was running away from. And at that moment there was an explosion of creativity."

== Productions ==
Disgraced was originally scheduled at the American Theater Company in Chicago, Illinois, to run February 3 – March 4, 2012, with an official debut of February 6. The run was moved forward one week to January 27 – February 26, 2012, with an official January 30 debut. On February 21, its run was extended in Chicago until March 11, 2012.

It made its New York debut of its Off-Broadway run at LCT3/Lincoln Center Theater with an October 22, 2012, premiere and was scheduled to run until November 18 before being extended until December 2. Hurricane Sandy caused the cancellation of the October 28 and 29 evening performances but not the October 28 matinee. On November 1, it was extended again until December 23.

On February 6, 2013, the London premiere of the play was announced as an Off West End opening at the Bush Theatre, beginning in May 2013 under the direction of Nadia Fall. Its previews were scheduled to begin on May 17 before opening on May 22 and running until June 15. On March 15, Disgraced was extended until June 22. The play opened as scheduled on May 22. That July, the producer Matthew Rego announced that the show was being considered for a Broadway run during the 2013–14 season. On June 10, 2014, was announced to have a Broadway run starting on October 23, following previews beginning September 27 at the Lyceum Theatre.

== On Broadway ==
Disgraced began its limited run on Broadway at the Lyceum Theatre with preview performances on September 27, 2014. Opening night was October 23 with an original announced run lasting until February 15, 2015. In January, the closure of the engagement was announced for March 1. Direction was by Kimberly Senior, sets by John Lee Beatty, costumes by Jennifer von Mayrhauser and lighting by Ken Posner. The cast included Danny Ashok, Hari Dhillon, Gretchen Mol, Karen Pittman, and Josh Radnor.

== Reception ==
=== Critical reviews ===
Charles Isherwood of The New York Times, who saw the 2012 Off-Broadway production, said it was "a continuously engaging, vitally engaged play" that "bristles with wit and intelligence" and "puts contemporary attitudes toward religion under a microscope, revealing how tenuous self-image can be for people born into one way of being who have embraced another." Isherwood selected the play as one of his year-end Ten Best Plays of 2012. David Rooney of The Hollywood Reporter also selected it as among his Ten Best in New York Theater 2012, writing that Akhtar "staked a claim as one of the boldest voices to appear on the playwriting scene in recent years with this stinging swipe at the fallacy of the post-racial nation."

Of the Chicago production at American Theater company, Chicago Tribune theatre critic Chris Jones praised the show as "intensely arresting." Time Out Chicago's Kris Vire called the play "a compact, stunning gut punch addressing the cultural affinities some of us are allowed to escape and those we aren't." However, Chicago Sun-Times critic Hedy Weiss noted that the play's five characters were all "identity-warped", and the show was a "minefield... that feels all too deliberately booby-trapped by the playwright." The play won the Jeff Award—honoring excellence in Chicago Theater—for Best New Play in Chicago 2012.

Entertainment Weekly critic Thom Geier suggested that the ending was underdeveloped, but that the play was well-executed: "Akhtar packs a lot into his scenes, in terms of both coincidence-heavy personal drama and talky disquisitions on religion and politics, but he usually manages to pull back from the edge of too-muchness. There is an admirable restraint to director Kimberly Senior's well-paced scenes. Mandvi, best known for his comedy, has a surprisingly commanding stage presence and captures the full range of his character's internal conflicts."

=== Awards and nominations ===
The Chicago production received four Joseph Jefferson Awards nominations for the August 1, 2011, and July 31, 2012, theatrical productions season on August 21. Disgraced was recognized as the Best New Work – Play or Musical on October 15, 2012.

In its description of the play, the 2013 Pulitzer Prize for Drama committee described it as "a moving play that depicts a successful corporate lawyer painfully forced to consider why he has for so long camouflaged his Pakistani Muslim heritage." The Pulitzer jury was headed by The Washington Post's theater critic Peter Marks. Playwright Donald Margulies, Princeton University professor Jill Dolan, critic John Fleming and critic Alexis Soloski were also on the jury.

On April 3, Aasif Mandvi earned a 2013 Lucille Lortel Award nomination for Outstanding Lead Actor. On April 22 Ayad Akhtar received an Outer Critics Circle Award nomination for the John Gassner Award. Akhtar won a 2013 Obie Award for Playwriting on May 20. On May 8, the production was nominated for a 2013 Off-Broadway Alliance Award for Best New Play. It lost to Vanya and Sonia and Masha and Spike on May 21.

On April 28, 2015, the Broadway production was nominated for the Tony Award for Best Play at the 69th Tony Awards.

==== Chicago production ====
Year	Award	Category	Nominee	Result
2012	Joseph Jefferson Awards	Production – Play – Midsize		Nominated
2012	Joseph Jefferson Awards	Actor in a Principal Role – Play	Usman Ally	Nominated
2012	Joseph Jefferson Awards	New Work – Play or Musical		Won
2012	Joseph Jefferson Awards	Scenic Design – Midsize	Jack Magaw	Nominated

==== Off-Broadway production ====
Year	Award	Category	Nominee	Result
2013	Pulitzer Prize	Drama	Ayad Akhtar	Won
2013	Lucille Lortel Award	Outstanding Lead Actor	Aasif Mandvi	Nominated
2013	Outer Critics Circle Award	John Gassner Award	Ayad Akhtar	Nominated
2013	Obie Award	Playwriting	Ayad Akhtar	Won
2013	Off Broadway Alliance Awards	Best New Play		Nominated

Disgraced's Off-Broadway premiere competed in the 2012-13 season for Off-Broadway awards such as Drama Desk, leaving only new actors and technical staff eligible in the Broadway transfer in 2015.

==== Broadway production ====
Year	Award	Category	Nominee	Result	Ref.
2015	Tony Awards	Best Play		Nominated	
