= Jennifer von Mayrhauser =

American costume designer

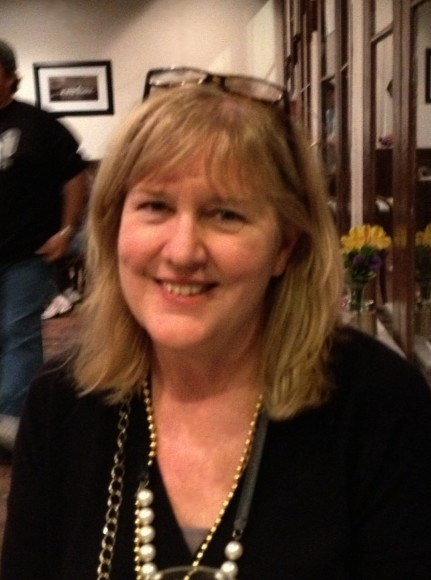
- Born: Ithaca, New York
- Occupation: Costume designer

Jennifer von Mayrhauser is an American costume designer who has designed costumes for more than thirty Broadway productions, and is notable for her significant contributions in film, television, and theatre.

== Life and studies ==
von Mayrhauser was born in Ithaca, New York. Her father, Thomas G. Bergin, a noted author and a translator of Dante, Petrarch and Vico, was also a professor and Master of Timothy Dwight College at Yale University. She attended Emma Willard School in Troy, New York, founded by the women's rights advocate Emma Willard in 1814. She also studied at Francis Holland School in London. She then earned a theatre degree from Northwestern University in Evanston, Illinois. In New York City she studied costume design at Lester Polakov's New York Studio and Forum of Stage Design, a significant training program for theatre designers, founded in 1958 in Greenwich Village. She was Adjunct Professor of Costume Design at Brandeis University from 1991 to 2012. She is married to Richard Cottrell, with whom she has two daughters: Julia Dennison, who is an editor and journalist in New York, and Lucy Cottrell, a therapist in New York.

She began her career in New York assisting Santo Loquasto and Carrie Robbins, and she began designing costumes herself in 1973. She then joined Circle Repertory Company as resident designer, designing over thirty shows there including her first Broadway show, Knock Knock, in 1976.

== Broadway ==
Jennifer von Mayrhauser's Broadway costume designs include: Disgraced, written by Ayad Akhtar and directed by Kimberly Senior; Wit; Come Back Little Sheba, written by William Inge, directed by Michael Pressman, and starring S. Epatha Merkerson, Kevin Anderson, and Zoe Kazan; Rabbit Hole, written by David Lindsay-Abaire, directed by Daniel Sullivan, and starring Cynthia Nixon and Tyne Daly; A Thousand Clowns, written by Herb Gardner, directed by Scott Ellis, starring Judd Hirsch and Marin Hinkle; The Heidi Chronicles, written by Wendy Wasserstein, directed by Daniel J. Sullivan, starring Joan Allen and Boyd Gaines; Execution of Justice, Hay Fever, written by Noël Coward, directed by Brian Murray, and starring Rosemary Harris; the musical Baby, directed by Richard Maltby, Jr., book by Sybille Pearson, music by David Shire, lyrics by Richard Maltby, Jr., and starring Liz Callaway, Beth Fowler, Todd Graff, Catherine Cox and Martin Vidnovic; Passion, Angels Fall, written by Lanford Wilson, directed by Marshall W. Mason, and starring Fritz Weaver, Nancy Snyder, Tanya Berezin and Barnard Hughes; Steaming; The Wake of Jamey Foster; Beyond Therapy; The Musical Comedy Murders of 1940; Special Occasions; Talley's Folly; The Night of the Iguana; The Boys in Autumn; directed by Theodore Mann, and starring George C. Scott and John Cullum as Huck Finn and Tom Sawyer; Awake and Sing; The Father; and John Gabriel Borkman, written by Henrik Ibsen, directed by Austin Pendleton, and starring E.G. Marshall, Rosemary Murphy and Irene Worth.

== Off-Broadway ==
She has designed costumes Off-Broadway, including the American premiere of Penelope Skinner’s play, Linda, directed by Lynne Meadow; Prodigal Son, written and directed by John Patrick Shanley; Dada Woof Papa Hot by Peter Parnell and directed by Scott Ellis; Ripcord, by David Lindsay-Abaire and directed by David Hyde Pierce; Domesticated, by Bruce Norris at Lincoln Center; Me Myself and I by Edward Albee, at Playwrights Horizons in New York, Have You Seen Us by Athol Fugard at the Long Wharf Theatre; Third by Wendy Wasserstein at Lincoln Center; Pain and the Itch by Bruce Norris at Playwrights Horizons in New York; All Over by Edward Albee at the Roundabout Theatre; The Miss Firecracker Contest at Manhattan Theatre Club; The Musical Comedy Murders of 1940 at Circle Rep; Danny and the Deep Blue Sea at the Second Stage Theatre; and Uncommon Women & Others, at the Phoenix Theatre.

== Regional Theater ==
In the fall of 2025, von Mayrhauser designed the costumes for The Hills of California, written by Jez Butterworth and directed by Loretta Greco, at the Huntington Theater in Boston and at Berkely Rep in California.

She designed The Glass Menagerie, written by Tennessee Williams at the Guthrie Theater and at the McCarter Theater. It was directed by Emily Mann, and starred Shirley Knight as Amanda.

== Film ==
She has designed costumes for more than twelve films, including: The Private Lives of Pippa Lee, directed by Rebecca Miller, and starring Robin Wright, Blake Lively, Alan Arkin, Keanu Reeves, Maria Bello, Zoe Kazan, Winona Ryder, Monica Bellucci, Julianne Moore and Shirley Knight; The Ballad of Jack and Rose, starring Daniel Day-Lewis, Camilla Belle, Catherine Keener and Paul Dano; First Born, Double Whammy; The Real Blonde; I'm Not Rappaport, written and directed by Herb Gardner and starring Walter Matthau; Captain Ron; Bed & Breakfast; Passed Away, starring Blair Brown, Tim Curry, Frances McDormand, Maureen Stapleton and Dylan Baker; The Hand That Rocks the Cradle, directed by Curtis Hanson, and starring Annabella Sciorra, Julianne Moore and Rebecca De Mornay; Lean on Me and Mystic Pizza, starring Julia Roberts, Lili Taylor and Matt Damon.

== Television ==
She has designed costumes for television including: The pilot episode for the CBS drama series FBI: Most Wanted, the CBS series FBI, the USA series The Sinner, starring Jessica Biel and Bill Pullman; and the pilot for SEAL Team a dramatic series starring David Boreanaz that premiered on CBS in September 2017; The Tap (pilot); Game of Silence (pilot); The Slap; Under the Dome; Unforgettable; In Treatment (Debra Winger's costumes); Law & Order (eighteen seasons); Conviction; Carry Me Home; The Dreamer of Oz; Women & Wallace; Perfect Witness; Adventures of Huckleberry Finn, starring Lillian Gish, Sada Thompson, Butterfly McQueen and Geraldine Page; New York Undercover; Feds; The Days and Nights of Molly Dodd; For Colored Girls Who Have Considered Suicide When the Rainbow Is Enuf; and Kiss Kiss, Darlings, written by Wendy Wasserstein, and starring Blythe Danner.

== Awards and nominations ==
von Mayrhauser was nominated for the American Theatre Wing Hewes Design Award for The Pain and the Itch. She received an Obie Award for "Sustained Excellence in Costume Design", an Emmy Award Nomination for "Outstanding Costume Design for a Series" for Law & Order, and she was honored by the New York Women in Film and Television program Designing Hollywood.

She is a member of the Tony Award Nominating Committee for the 2015–2018 Broadway seasons.
