= Homeland Elegies =

2020 novel by Ayad Akhtar

- First edition
- Author: Ayad Akhtar
- Language: English
- Genre: Fiction
- Publisher: Little, Brown and Company
- Publication date: September 15, 2020
- Publication place: United States
- Pages: 343 pages
- ISBN: 978-0316496421

Homeland Elegies is a novel by author Ayad Akhtar.

== Writing and background ==
The book is fiction, though written to resemble a memoir. It includes some autobiographical elements; the protagonist shares the name, background, and career of the author. Homeland Elegies has been referred to as autofiction. Akhtar has spoken about wanting the effect of the novel to be like scrolling through social media: "It's essay. It's memoir. It's fiction. It just had to be seamless, in the way that a platform like Instagram is seamless. And one of the pivotal dimensions of that content is the staging and curation of the self." He adds that crafting the book in the first person, and calling the narrator "Ayad Akhtar" allows him "to have a relationship to the reader that felt more immediate than fiction. But I only know how to write fiction ... I wouldn't have known how to write a memoir."

The idea for writing Homeland Elegies came to Akhtar while he was in Rome, reading Giacomo Leopardi's Canti. The first poem "To Italy" inspired him to write a novel about America, that "seemed on the verge of splitting apart". Homeland Elegies begins with "An Overture to America" and then is divided into eight sections, followed by a coda entitled "Free Speech". Akhtar modeled sections after different Tolstoy novellas: "V. Riaz; or the Merchant of Death" via Hadji Murad; "VI. Of Love and Death" related to The Kreutzer Sonata; and "VIII. Langford v. Reliant; or, How My Father's American Story Ends" after The Death of Ivan Ilych.

The book comments on the recent political and financial history of the United States including the election of Donald Trump, the September 11 attacks, and America's debt-fueled economy.

== Reception ==
=== Critical reception ===
Dwight Garner, in his review for The New York Times, praised Homeland Elegies as "a beautiful novel about an American son and his immigrant father". Garner perceived "echoes" of The Great Gatsby in the novel, stating that it "circles, with pointed intellect, the possibilities and limitations of American life". Rafia Zakaria, writing for the Boston Globe, compared the work favorably to the novels and memoir of Salman Rushdie. Alexandra Schwartz, in her profile of Akhtar in The New Yorker, called the novel "a crescendo of grievance reminiscent of Allen Ginsberg's Howl ... [Akhtar] denounces the nation's recent sins and failures ... rails against the country's cult of greed, its prostitution of private life for public attention, its allegiance to devices ... to give his own account of the riven nation." Ron Charles of The Washington Post lauded the book, calling it a "tour de force" and declared that he would not be surprised "if it wins [Akhtar] a second Pulitzer Prize". Junot Diaz, reviewing the book for O Magazine, called Homeland Elegies "the book of the year".

=== Honors ===
Homeland Elegies was named a top 10 book of 2020 by The New York Times, The Washington Post, Publishers Weekly, Entertainment Weekly, Shelf Awareness, and Time.

O Magazine, Slate, Kirkus Reviews, NPR, The Economist, Library Journal, and the New York Public Library named Homeland Elegies as one of the best books of 2020.

Barack Obama named Homeland Elegies one of his favorite books of 2020.

The novel was a finalist for the 2021 Andrew Carnegie Medal for Excellence in Fiction.

Homeland Elegies won the 2021 American Book Award and the 2021 Wisconsin Library Association Literary Award.

== Television adaptation ==
FX is developing an eight-episode limited series of Homeland Elegies, adapted by Akhtar and Oren Moverman, who will direct all eight episodes. Kumail Nanjiani will star in the series.
