= McNeal (play) =

Stage play by Ayad Akhtar

- Broadway promotional poster
- Original language: English
- Written by: Ayad Akhtar
- Genre: Drama
- Setting: Present-day United States

Premiere
- Date: September 30, 2024
- Place: Vivian Beaumont Theater
- Directed by: Bartlett Sher

McNeal is a one-act stage play written by Ayad Akhtar.

== Summary and response ==
The play deals with topics such as artificial intelligence, artistic integrity, plagiarism, and copyright infringement.

Emily Eakins of The New York Times called the play "provocative...Akhtar pushes beyond the confines of the usual morality play" and Jeffrey Goldberg in The Atlantic called the play "transfixing in part because it tracks without flinching the disintegration of a celebrated writer, and in part because Akhtar goes to a place that few writers have visited so effectively—the very near future, in which large language models threaten to undo our self-satisfied understanding of creativity, plagiarism, and originality."

== Production history ==
=== Broadway (2024) ===
Previews of the play began on Broadway on September 5, 2024, at the Vivian Beaumont Theater at Lincoln Center. The show officially opened on September 30. It was directed by Bartlett Sher.

The production's limited engagement ran until November 24, 2024, finishing with 23 previews and 53 regular performances.

=== Austria (2025) ===
The Austrian premiere of the play began at the Burgtheater in March 2025 starring Joachim Meyerhoff as Jacob McNeal.

=== Düsseldorf (2025) ===
In September 2025, the Düsseldorfer Schauspielhaus production premieres, starring Thiemo Schwarz as Jacob McNeal. It's directed by German director Philipp Rosendahl and choreographed by Canadian choreographer Alessia Ruffolo.

=== Milwaukee (2026) ===
McNeal became the best‑selling production in the history of the newly named at the Herro‑Franke Studio Theater, a blackbox theater at the Milwaukee Rep. Directed by Mark Clements, the titular role was played by Peter Bradbury, with Jeanne Paulsen as Stephie, Ty Fanning as Holden, N’Jameh Camara as Natasha, Jessica Ko as Dr. Sahra, Sara Sadjadi as Dipti and Bridget Ann White as Francine.

== Cast and characters ==
Character	Broadway
Character	2024
Jacob McNeal	Robert Downey Jr.
Francine Blake	Melora Hardin
Sahra Grewal	Ruthie Ann Miles
Stephie Banic	Andrea Martin
Natasha Brathwaite	Brittany Bellizeare
Harlan McNeal	Rafi Gavron
Dipti	Saisha Talwar

== Publication ==
The play was published in The Atlantic in December 2024 with a foreword by Jeremy Strong.
