= Vivian Beaumont Theater =

Broadway theater in Manhattan, New York

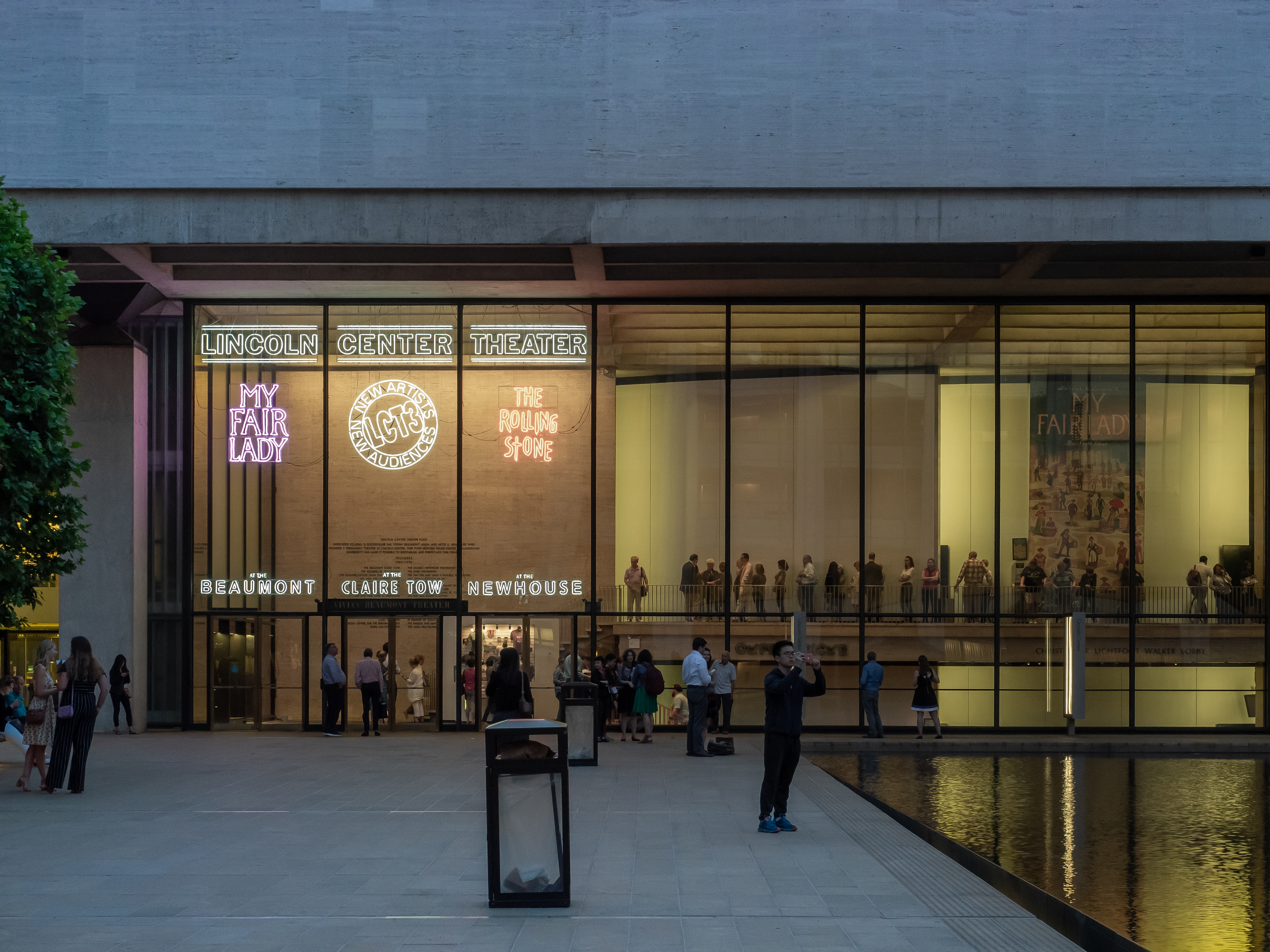
- Interactive map of Vivian Beaumont Theater
- Address: 150 West 65th Street; Manhattan, New York; United States
- Coordinates: 40°46′25″N 73°59′03″W
- Owner: Lincoln Center for the Performing Arts, Inc.
- Operator: Lincoln Center Theater
- Capacity: 1,080
- Type: Broadway
- Production: A Few Good Men
- Public transit: Subway: 1 train at 66th Street–Lincoln Center; NYC Bus: M5, M7, M11, M20, M66, M104

Construction
- Opened: October 21, 1965 (61 years ago)
- Architects: Eero Saarinen and Jo Mielziner

Website
- www.lct.org/about/beaumont-theater/

The Vivian Beaumont Theater is a Broadway theater in the Lincoln Center complex at 150 West 65th Street on the Upper West Side of Manhattan in New York City, New York, U.S. Operated by the nonprofit Lincoln Center Theater (LCT), the Beaumont is the only Broadway theater outside the Theater District that surrounds Times Square. Named after heiress and actress Vivian Beaumont Allen, the theater was one of the last structures designed by modernist architect Eero Saarinen. Broadway scenic designer Jo Mielziner oversaw the design of the interior. The theater shares a building with the New York Public Library for the Performing Arts and contains two off-Broadway venues, the Mitzi E. Newhouse Theater and the Claire Tow Theater.

The Beaumont occupies the southern and western sides of its building's first and second floors, while the library wraps above and on top of it. The main facade faces Lincoln Center's plaza and is made of glass and steel, with a travertine attic above. The main auditorium has approximately 1,080 seats across two levels, arranged in a steeply sloped semicircular layout. The Beaumont differs from traditional Broadway theaters because of its use of a flexible stage, which could be extended with a thrust stage of varying length. The layout led to complaints about inferior sightlines and acoustics in the theater's early years. The 299-seat Mitzi E. Newhouse Theater is in the basement and the 112-seat Claire Tow Theater is above the Beaumont.

Allen donated $3 million for the theater's construction in 1958 but died before its completion. The Beaumont opened on October 21, 1965, and was originally operated by Jules Irving and Herbert Blau of the Repertory Theater of Lincoln Center, generally presenting four shows a season. The Beaumont was managed by the New York Shakespeare Festival, under the direction of Joseph Papp, from 1973 to 1977. Richmond Crinkley took over the theater for the next eight years, with the Beaumont only operating for two seasons during that time. Controversies over the Beaumont's operation, a proposed renovation, and financial difficulties led to LCT being reorganized in 1985, with Gregory Mosher and Bernard Gersten taking over as the new Director and the Executive Producer respectively. The Beaumont became much more successful and was renovated in 1996. The theater has hosted several popular productions since the late 1980s, including Anything Goes, Contact, The Light in the Piazza, South Pacific, The King and I, My Fair Lady, and Ragtime.

== Description ==
The Vivian Beaumont Theater was designed by Finnish American architect Eero Saarinen, with Broadway scenic designer Jo Mielziner overseeing the design of the interior. It is part of Lincoln Center, a performing arts complex on the Upper West Side of Manhattan in New York City, New York, U.S. The Beaumont is in the same building as the New York Public Library (NYPL)'s Performing Arts Library, designed by Gordon Bunshaft of Skidmore, Owings & Merrill (SOM). Various contractors were also involved in the Beaumont's construction, including general contractor Turner Construction, acoustical engineer Bolt Beranek & Newman, structural engineer Ammann & Whitney and mechanical engineer Syska Hennessy.

The library–theater building is on the western side of Paul Milstein Pool and Terrace, the elevated plaza at the middle of Lincoln Center, just south of 65th Street. The plaza contains a reflecting pool at its center, measuring around 80 ft (24 m) wide and 120 or 125 ft (37 or 38 m) long. (Note: Pelkonen & Albrecht 2006, p. 214, cites the pool as being 125 feet long, while Stern, Mellins & Fishman 1995, p. 697, gives a length of 120 feet.) Inside the plaza, just outside the theater's entrance, is a blackened-steel sculpture by Alexander Calder entitled Le Guichet. Named after the French word for "ticket window", the sculpture measures 14 ft (4.3 m) wide by 22 ft (6.7 m) high. Another sculpture by Henry Moore, entitled Reclining Figure, is in the pool. The structure faces the Metropolitan Opera House to the south; David Geffen Hall to the east; and the Juilliard School to the north, via a pedestrian bridge across 65th Street.

=== Form and facade ===
The library–theater building was the third to open at Lincoln Center. Original plans conceived the library and theater as separate buildings, but the structures were combined in the final plan. The theater forms the building's core and occupies the southern and western sides of the building's first and second floors. The library runs along the building's northern and eastern sides, as well as much of the third floor. The theater's stage house protrudes through the third floor, with the library running around it in a "doughnut" shape. Another entrance to the library, facing west toward Amsterdam Avenue, is below the theater. The attic houses the library's stacks.

SOM and Saarinen collaborated on the design of the exteriors. The main facade, along Lincoln Center's plaza, is two stories high and made of glass and steel. The facade consists of a glass curtain wall and two recessed square concrete columns, which create a peristyle flanking the curtain wall. Unlike the travertine surface of the plaza, the columns are finished in exposed aggregate. The columns are attached to the attic via steel pins with large bronze pyramidal covers. The other wall surfaces are clad in travertine.

The exterior of the library–theater building contains a heavy roof that protrudes over the main facade, which is covered in travertine. The roof was designed to screen the library and its performing-arts museum behind it. The top of the roof originally had an exposed-aggregate finish, but this was subsequently covered with stone pavement. On the underside of the roof are coffers containing recessed downlights as well as fluorescent uplights. Similar lighting fixtures are used in the theater's lobby as well as throughout the library's interior. The roof is carried by two Vierendeel trusses measuring 20 ft (6.1 m) high and 153 ft (47 m) long. (Note: Architectural Record 1962, p. 143, gives a different depth of 18 ft (5.5 m). Progressive Architecture 1965, p. 191 gives a slightly differing length of 152 ft (46 m).) Part of the library, housing the Vincent Astor Gallery, is placed between the trusses.

=== Interior ===
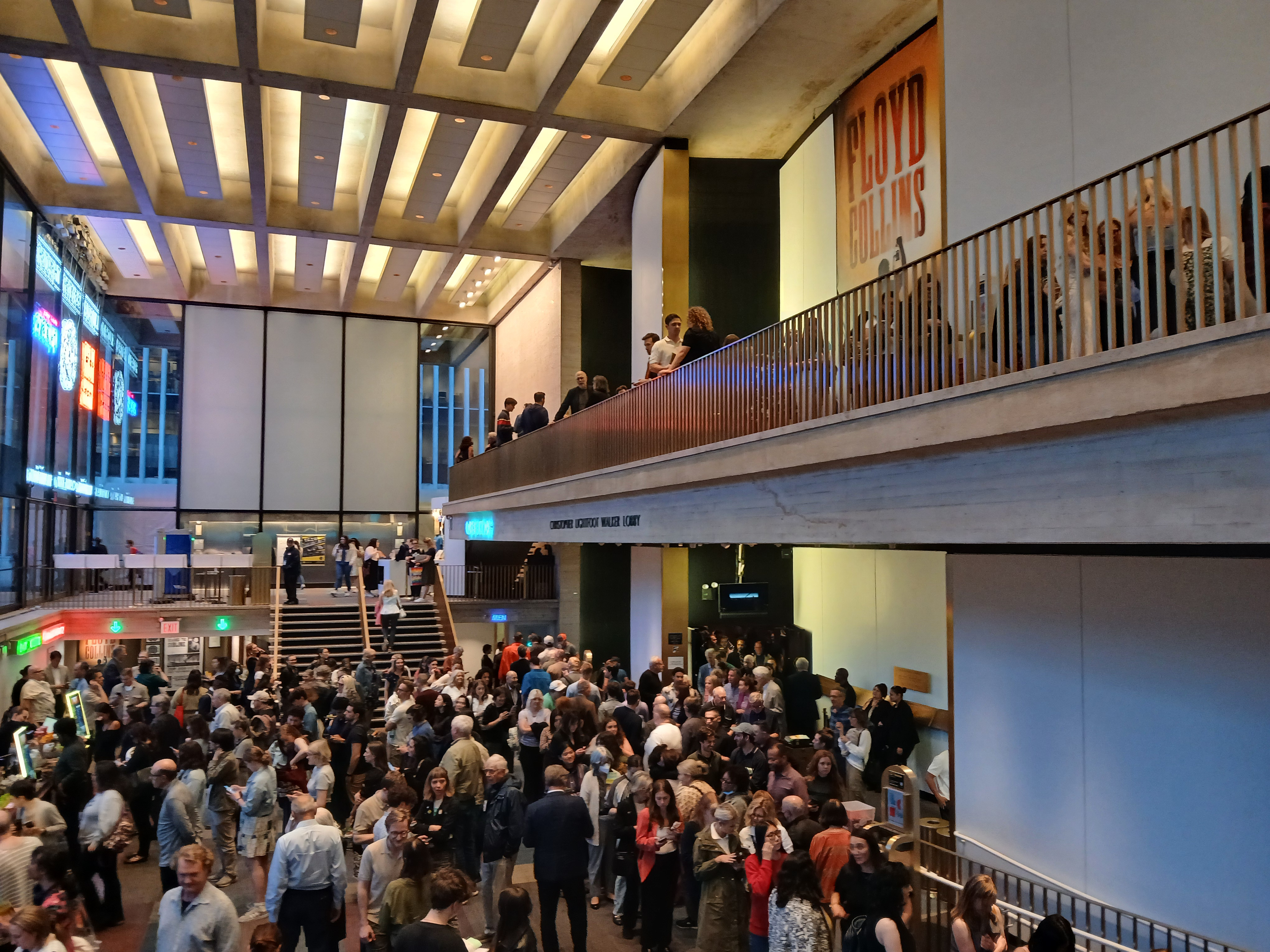
The lobby, which connects with the main auditorium at right and the Newhouse Theater at left

The Beaumont contains three theaters operated by Lincoln Center Theater (LCT): the main auditorium, which is classified as a Broadway theater, as well as two off-Broadway venues, the Mitzi E. Newhouse Theater and the Claire Tow Theater. The main auditorium is the only Broadway theater outside Manhattan's Theater District, and productions there are eligible for Tony Awards. The off-Broadway houses' productions are not eligible for Tony Awards unless they move to the Beaumont's main auditorium or another Broadway theater.

The Beaumont has two main access points. Vehicular traffic enters through a ramp beneath the theater, where patrons take elevators to the orchestra. Pedestrians enter through the main plaza facing David Geffen Hall and the Metropolitan Opera House. The plaza-level lobby is midway between the orchestra and balcony levels of the primary auditorium. The plaza-level lobby is plain in design and was originally decorated in travertine and bronze, with white wall panels and red carpets. Rather than a traditional coat room, the theater had lockers along its public corridors. Broad, curving double staircases lead from the lobby to both levels of seating. Below the orchestra, another flight of stairs leads down to the Newhouse Theater.

There are two basements for backstage areas such as offices, dressing rooms, workshops, rehearsal studios, and green rooms. The Shiki Room hosts auditions, and there are also three rehearsal studios known as the large, medium, and small rehearsal rooms. A cellar beneath the basements contains mechanical equipment, and more backstage spaces are located on the roof. An elevator connects all the stories.

==== Primary auditorium ====
The Beaumont uses steeply sloped stadium seating. Unlike other Broadway theaters, the stage could be configured as a traditional proscenium stage or extended with a thrust stage of varying length. Backstage, there is 10,000 ft^{2} (930 m^{2}) for set storage. The stage and its backstage facilities take up about 75 percent of the theater's area.

===== Seating areas =====
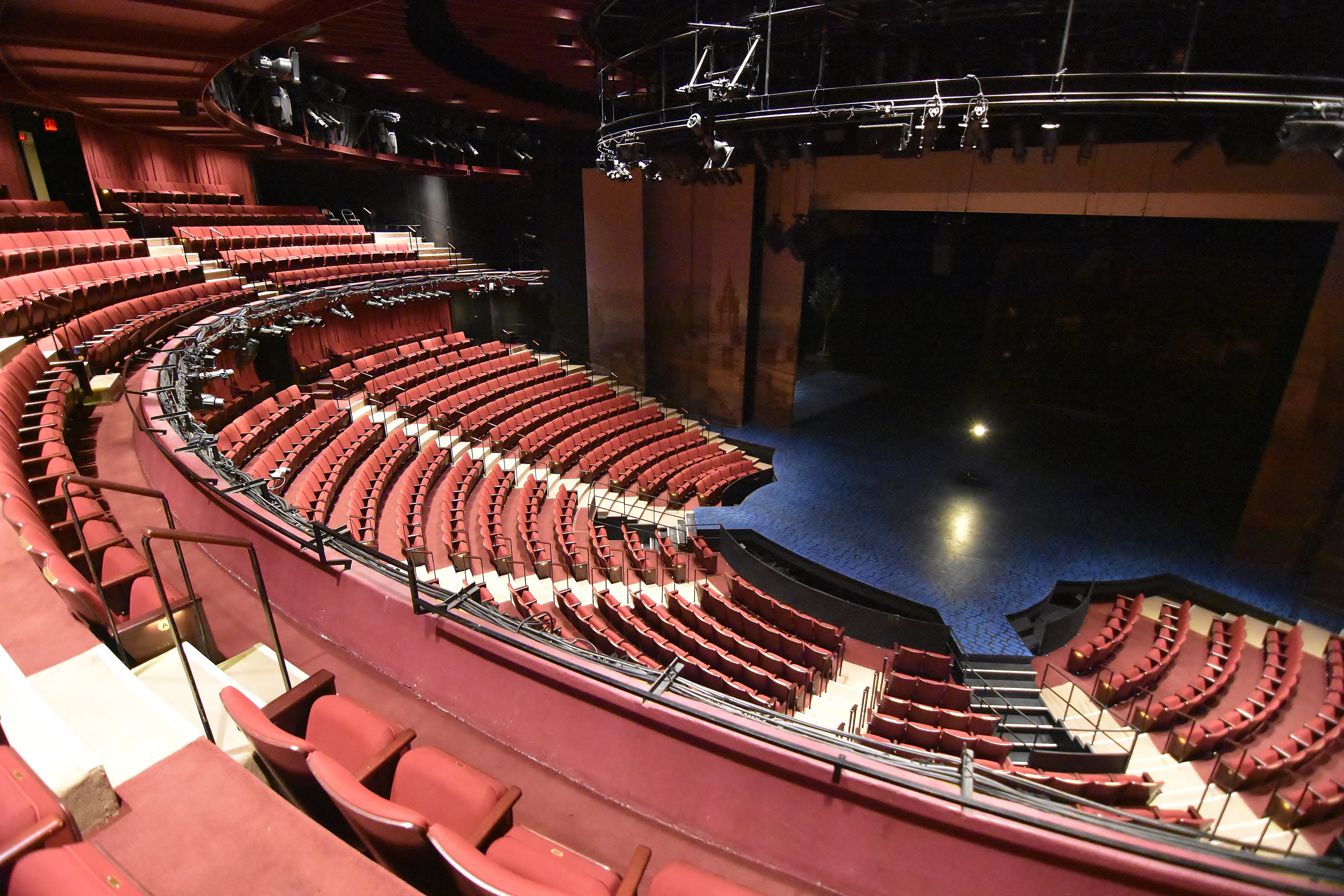
View of auditorium from balcony level. The auditorium has steeply sloped stadium seating, arranged in a semicircle with its ends cut back. Here, the front rows at orchestra level are arranged in a proscenium configuration. These front rows are placed on a turntable; they can be removed whenever a thrust stage is used.

The Broadway League and the LCT Review magazine cite the main auditorium as having 1,080 seats, while Playbill gives a figure of 1,069 seats. The main auditorium originally had approximately 1,100 seats, with about 770 in the orchestra level and 330 in the balcony level. (Note: Progressive Architecture 1965, p. 192, gave a figure of 1,140 seats, with 779 on orchestra level and 361 in the balcony.) The actual capacity depended on the configuration of the stage. As designed, 30 seats at the front of the orchestra could be stored in the basement when the thrust stage was used; these seats were placed on a hydraulic lift, which was never used and was eventually scrapped in the 1990s. Additional seats could be removed to make way for vomitories. Consequently, the theater could have 1,146 seats if a proscenium stage were used, or 1,102 seats if there was an orchestra pit in front of the stage. In a thrust-stage configuration, the theater could have 1,113 seats, which was reduced to 1,083 if actors were allowed to pass through the orchestra seating to get to the stage.

The seating is arranged in a semicircle with its ends cut back, allowing adequate sightlines when a traditional proscenium stage is used. A cantilevered walkway leads to the balcony level, which only has five rows of seats, two of which cantilever over the orchestra. In all configurations, every seat is at most 65 ft (20 m) from the stage. The American Seating Company installed the seats, which were originally upholstered in red fabric. Plaques were mounted onto the backs of each seat, indicating the seat number and the name of a donor. The seats were covered with deep burgundy fabric in 1990.

The auditorium had a minimalist decorative scheme. The original decorations comprised dark brown wood and metal, as well as red and gray carpets; Saarinen's firm described the color scheme as "bittersweet chocolate brown" and red. The design includes curving oval motifs, which visually connect the two levels of seating with the stage and ceiling. The aisle lights were recessed into the ends of the aisles. Typical theaters had lights embedded within the risers of the stairs in each aisle, but the theater's semicircular arrangement meant that such lights could be distracting to patrons on the opposite side of the auditorium.

===== Other design features =====
There are seven removable panels placed across the proscenium opening. When all the panels are removed, the proscenium is 58 ft (18 m) wide; the panels can also be used to seal the proscenium completely. The two outermost panels must be manually removed, while the other five panels can be lifted mechanically using a counterweight system. Because of the presence of the removable panels, the stage curtain is placed in front of the proscenium opening, contrary to in most theaters. The stage curtain is mounted on a curving steel frame, which runs parallel to the 14 ft-deep (4.3 m) stage apron. The entire stage was illuminated with 565 spotlights, hung from four semicircular catwalks and hidden behind "fins" on the ceiling. The Beaumont was the first Broadway theater with an electronic lighting system because, as Mielziner said, "Economically, we can't afford to use old switchboards and old methods". Speakers were installed during the mid-1990s because, as designed, the auditorium had poor acoustics.

The stage covers 11,000 ft^{2} (1,000 m^{2}). (Note: Progressive Architecture 1965, p. 192, cited the stage as occupying 10,000 sq ft (930 m^{2}).) This was far larger than any other Broadway theater's stage at the time, as the next-largest stage covered 2,914 ft^{2} (270.7 m^{2}). The Beaumont's thrust stage is surrounded by seats on three sides; when fully extended, is 28 ft (8.5 m) deep and 25 ft (7.6 m) wide and is placed on a lift that can descend to the basement. Lincoln Center's drama consultant Robert Whitehead had wanted the thrust stage, saying: "There is something exciting in the way the action spills out into the audience and the audience embraces it." For productions that use only the thrust stage, performers enter from underneath the stage, and the proscenium is closed off. Tunnels are provided under the seating areas so performers could enter the stage. Since the semicircular seating precluded good views of the rear of the proscenium stage, many of the theater's productions were forced to use the front of the apron. The unconventional mixture of stage designs prompted many designers and directors to avoid the theater entirely.

Beneath the stage is a turntable measuring 46 ft (14 m) across, which allows the thrust stage to be expanded. When the thrust stage was used, the first seven rows of the orchestra could be lowered into the basement. The turntable carries a semicircular floor panel with rows of orchestra seating (for when the theater is configured as a proscenium stage), as well as another semicircular panel with the thrust stage and three rows of seating. Whenever the stage is reconfigured, the lifts beneath the front orchestra rows and the thrust stage are lowered. The semicircular floor panels are then unlocked from the lift and connected to each other before being rotated, disconnected, and raised. A second platform, measuring 5 ft (1.5 m) wide, surrounds the turntable and can move independently.

==== Off-Broadway spaces ====
===== Mitzi E. Newhouse Theater =====
In the lower level of the building is the Mitzi E. Newhouse Theater, originally known as the Forum when it opened on November 10, 1967. The theater was renamed in 1972 for Mrs. Samuel I. Newhouse, a prominent patron of the theater. Designed by Saarinen and Mielziner, the Newhouse is a 299-seat venue in which Lincoln Center Theater presents its off-Broadway plays and musicals. The Newhouse Theater originally was accessible only through the Beaumont's parking garage. The Newhouse contains a thrust stage; unlike the larger Broadway theater above, the Newhouse cannot be configured in a proscenium layout. Its existence came about because, during planning, Lincoln Center's board could not agree on what types of productions the Forum should present.

===== Claire Tow Theater =====
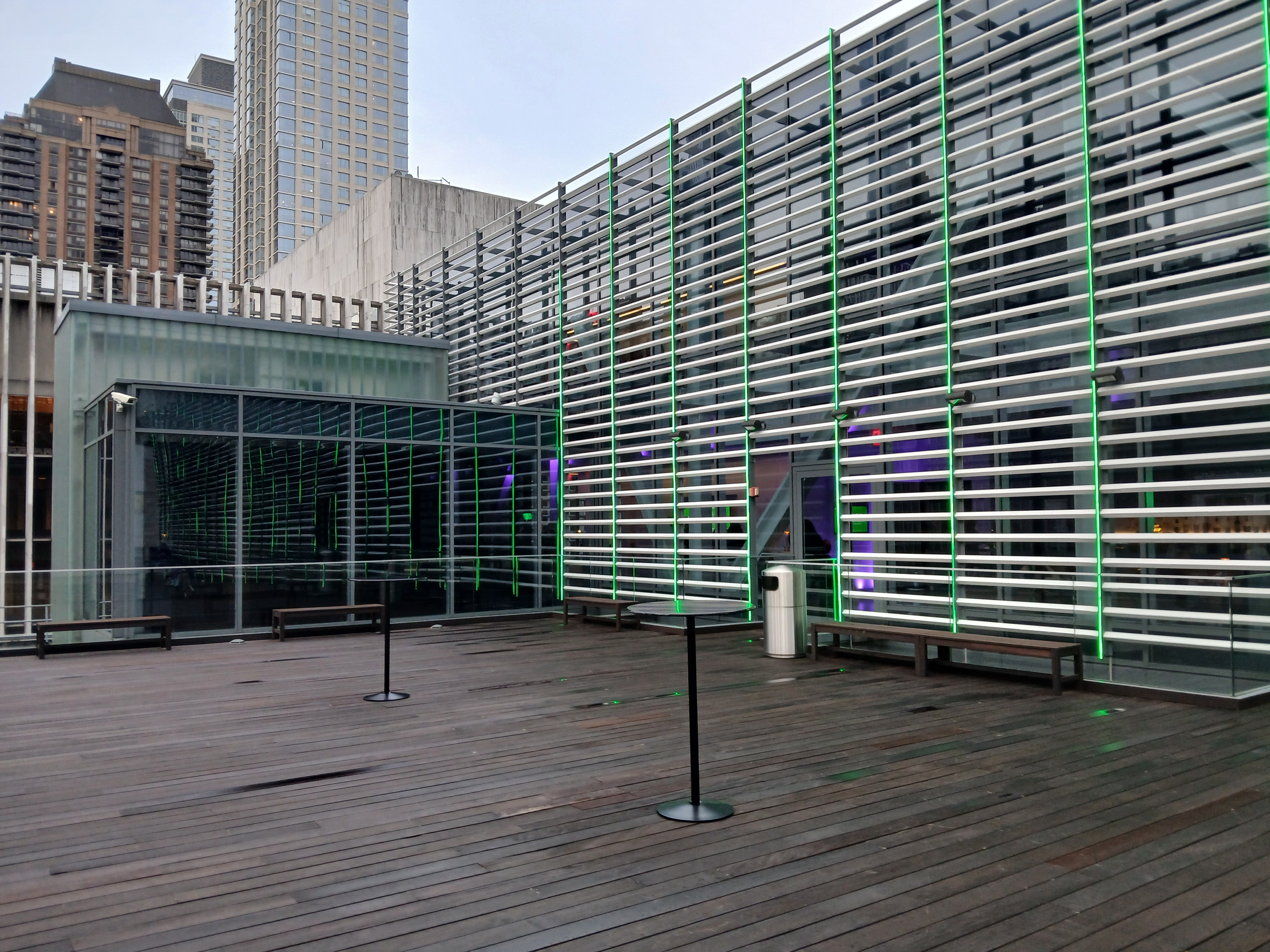
Observation deck outside the Claire Tow Theater

In June 2012, LCT opened the Claire Tow Theater above the Beaumont, which features work by emerging playwrights, directors, and designers. The auditorium is named for Claire Tow, whose husband Leonard Tow, an LCT board member, donated $7.5 million. Located on the Beaumont's planted green roof, the Claire Tow Theater seats 112 people. The space which cost about $41 million to construct, was designed by Hugh Hardy, who had assisted Mielziner in the Vivian Beaumont Theater's original design. The two-story, 23,000 ft^{2} (2,100 m^{2}) glass enclosure has the same width as the Beaumont's base. The theater is accessed by elevators within the NYPL section of the building. In addition to the auditorium, the Claire Tow houses rehearsal space, dressing quarters, offices, and a pocket lobby with a bar. The structure is wrapped inside a grille of aluminum louvers that help screen out the sun. Hardy used simple materials for the interior, including stained oak for the lobby floors and walnut for the theater's sloping walls. The bar features Overture, a 2012 sculpture by Kiki Smith.

== History ==
=== Development ===
The Lincoln Square Renewal Project had been proposed in 1955 as part of urban planner Robert Moses's urban renewal program. The Lincoln Center performing-arts complex became a key part of the urban renewal, though it was not part of Moses's initial intentions for the site. John D. Rockefeller III led Lincoln Center's development, which from the start included venues for the New York Philharmonic, Metropolitan Opera, and New York City Ballet. The first plans for the complex, announced in May 1956, included plans for five commercial theaters. Lincoln Center Inc. was founded in June 1956 to oversee the development, and the company acquired the land in February 1958.

Vivian Beaumont Allen, a former actress and heiress to the May Department Stores fortune, donated $3 million in May 1958 for the construction of the repertory theater at Lincoln Center, saying she wanted the theater to be "comparable in distinction and achievement to the Comédie-Française". Lincoln Center's board of directors then pledged to name the theater after Allen, and Rockefeller named Robert Whitehead as the consultant on the repertory theater. The Lincoln Center Theater would be the first repertory company in New York City since 1926, when the Civic Repertory Theater was founded, and it would occupy the first new Broadway theater since 1928, when the Ethel Barrymore Theatre opened.

==== Planning ====
Buildings of Lincoln Center
Buildings and structures in Lincoln Center:
1 Samuel B. and David Rose Building (includes Walter Reade Theater)
2 Juilliard School
3 Alice Tully Hall
4 Vivian Beaumont Theater (includes Mitzi E. Newhouse Theater and Claire Tow Theater)
5 Elinor Bunin Monroe Film Center
6 David Geffen Hall
7 New York Public Library for the Performing Arts (includes Bruno Walter Auditorium)
8 Metropolitan Opera House
9 Josie Robertson Plaza with Revson Fountain
10 Damrosch Park
11 David H. Koch Theater
12 David Rubenstein Atrium
13 Jazz at Lincoln Center

Wallace Harrison, the architect of the Philharmonic Hall, had declined an offer to design the other buildings in the complex but helped select the other architects. Various prominent architects and engineers were invited as consultants for the development, but Lincoln Center Inc. recommended that only American architects be selected for the final designs. The repertory theater and library were the last two buildings at Lincoln Center for which architects were selected. In November 1958, Eero Saarinen was selected as the architect for the Beaumont Theater, while Gordon Bunshaft was picked to design the performing-arts library. Even though Saarinen was not as well-connected as some of Lincoln Center's other architects, he was both an experienced auditorium designer and a prominent architect at the peak of his career. Whitehead and Harrison had chosen Saarinen for this reason. Shortly afterward, Jo Mielziner was hired to collaborate on the theater's interior design. The complex's general contractors were selected in January 1959.

Originally, the repertory theater and the library were to be separate buildings. Allen expressed concerns that the site allotted to the repertory theater was too small, in part because Robert Moses was intractable in his refusal to reduce the size of the nearby Damrosch Park. After the New York Public Library (NYPL) joined the project in June 1959, the library building and repertory theater were combined by that October, saving both money and space. Saarinen and Bunshaft had decided that "one building could house the two facilities better than two". During late 1959, Elia Kazan was also hired as a consultant for the repertory theater, helping Whitehead select the productions. Whitehead and Kazan established the nonprofit Lincoln Center Repertory Company in February 1960 to oversee the Beaumont's programming.

Only two conflicts between Saarinen and Bunshaft arose during the three-year planning process. Saarinen wanted to use three columns at each of the building's corners, while Bunshaft wanted to use one column; in addition, both architects sought to create the building's technical drawings. In the end, the architects used Bunshaft's column arrangement and Saarinen created the technical drawings. The architects considered and rejected 15 plans for the theater; one such plan envisioned the Beaumont Theater with a concave roof in the center, supported by piers on either side. The final scheme was tested in an unused movie theater in Pontiac, Michigan, where Mielziner drew up plans for theatrical sets he had designed in the past. By August 1960, Saarinen and Mielziner had reportedly finalized their plans for the repertory theater and the basement Forum, but they made minor modifications to these plans before the end of the year.

==== Construction ====
In January 1961, the New York state and city governments agreed to fund several buildings in Lincoln Center. The city would provide $12 million in total, including $8.2 million to the library–theater building, but none of the state's funding would go toward the library–theater. The design details were nearly finished when the New York City Council voted that March to withhold its funding for Lincoln Center. This move might have forced a redesign of the theater and library. However, the Rockefeller family (including state governor Nelson Rockefeller) agreed to cover the city's $12 million commitment so the theater could be completed by the 1964 New York World's Fair.

Following Saarinen's sudden death on September 1, 1961, his firm continued to work on the theater's development. The next month, excavation started on the library–theater building's site. That November, Saarinen's firm announced final plans for the repertory theater. Site excavation was more than half finished, and the repertory theater was renamed after Allen at this time. Lincoln Center's directors reported in March 1962 that the Beaumont's completion had been delayed to at least 1964. The delay was caused by the relocation of the repertory group's offices from the Juilliard School building into the library–theater building. Allen never saw her namesake theater completed, as she died in late 1962.

The Lincoln Center Repertory Company intended to premiere productions in 1963, regardless of whether the Beaumont Theater was completed. The theatre company began training in October 1962 and moved into the ANTA Washington Square Theatre, a temporary venue in Greenwich Village, in January 1964. Due to pressure from the theater's board following a badly received 1964–1965 season, as well as conflicts with Lincoln Center president William Schuman, Whitehead and Kazan resigned and were replaced by Herbert Blau and Jules Irving. By April 1965, Schuman and the repertory company's new president Robert L. Hoguet Jr. promised that the theater would open that June. The next month, a revival of Georg Büchner's play Danton's Death was booked as the Beaumont's inaugural production, and the opening date was pushed to October 21. The library–theater building ultimately cost $17 million, partly funded by $3 million from Allen and $7.5 million from the NYPL. Allen's philanthropic foundation also gave $2.1 million for training the repertory company's members.

=== Lincoln Center Repertory Company operation ===
==== First two seasons ====
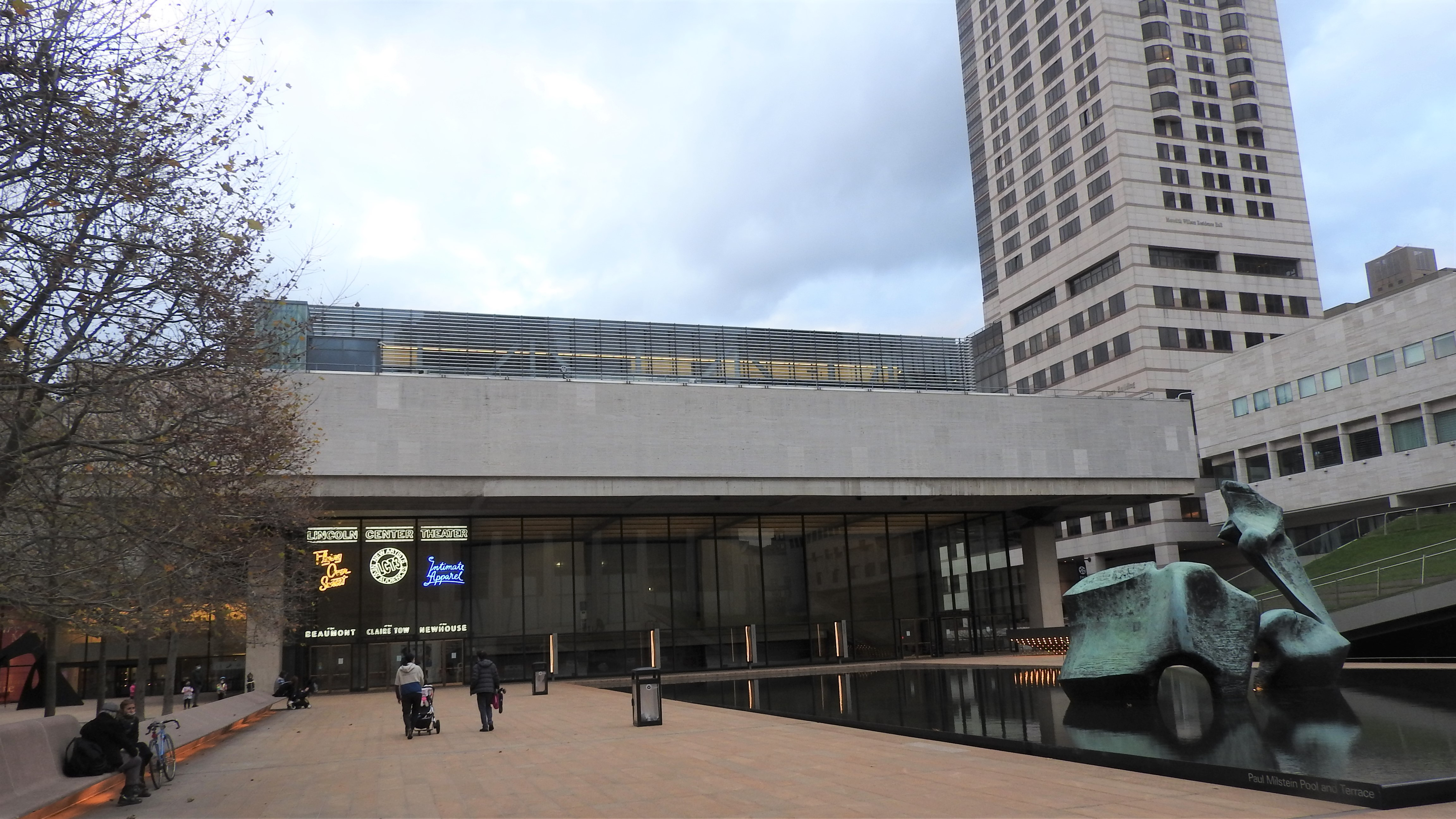
Seen from the elevated plaza

The Beaumont opened to the public on October 12, 1965, with previews of Danton's Death. The Beaumont was dedicated on October 14 and hosted a fundraising gala on October 20, which raised more than $100,000. The theater officially opened on October 21, (Note: The theater building was still technically not complete; the museum and library around the theater opened in December 1965.) when regular performances of Danton's Death began. The Beaumont's opening was not as widely reported in the media as some of Lincoln Center's other buildings, but it did receive mostly positive commentary. Progressive Architecture wrote that the theater was "one of the most innovational theater facilities in this country". John Chapman of the New York Daily News called the Beaumont's opening "the most important theatrical event of the 1965–66 season in this city", despite the mediocrity of Danton's Death. Wolf Von Eckardt wrote for The Washington Post that the Beaumont had a "classic" architectural appearance "without sweat or striving". The New York Concrete Board gave the Beaumont an award for the quality of its construction.

The Beaumont frequently starred Philip Bosco, Aline MacMahon, Nancy Marchand, and Robert Symonds in its early productions. The Lincoln Center Repertory Company offered subscriptions to each season of plays at the Beaumont. When the first preview of Danton's Death commenced, there were already 41,500 subscribers for the Beaumont's first season, representing over 90 percent of all available subscriptions. The other productions of the season were revivals of The Country Wife in December 1965, The Condemned of Altona in January 1966, and The Caucasian Chalk Circle in March 1966. While the first season had high grosses, there was much criticism of the plays themselves. Richard P. Cooke of The Wall Street Journal said the Lincoln Center Repertory Company "is still struggling for popular and critical acclaim", despite having both ample funding and up-to-date equipment at the Beaumont. Furthermore, the theater itself ran a deficit of several hundred thousand dollars each season, as the expenses outweighed the profits.

The theater had 31,400 subscribers before the first play of the Beaumont's second season opened in late 1966. The season's first two plays were The Alchemist and Yerma. Blau left at the beginning of 1967, saying: "The climate is no longer right for me to do what I came to do in the form I had in mind", as he had considered the Beaumont Theater's acoustics and technical design difficult to work with. Afterward, the Beaumont produced Galileo in April 1967. Galileo was the first play by an American playwright at the Beaumont, placating critics who objected to the number of plays by foreign authors. Next, Alexander H. Cohen leased the theater for the opening of The Unknown Soldier and His Wife that July. The repertory program was still not successful; The New York Times reported in late 1967 that Lincoln Center's "inability to build a successful repertory theater" was the complex's "greatest shortcoming" creatively. The experimental Forum in the Beaumont's basement opened on November 10, 1967.

==== Jules Irving management ====
The third season featured the plays The Little Foxes, Saint Joan, Tiger at the Gates, and Cyrano de Bergerac. As part of the 1968 Lincoln Center Festival, French theatre company Théâtre de la Cité performed The Three Musketeers, George Dandin, and Tartuffe at the Beaumont. This was followed by the play Lovers, also performed as part of the festival. The plays King Lear and A Cry of Players opened at the Beaumont in late 1968, running as a double bill. At the beginning of 1969, Robert Montgomery became the Lincoln Center Repertory Theater's president. The Beaumont hosted the play In the Matter of J. Robert Oppenheimer during much of the remainder of the season, interrupted by a short run of The Miser that May. The Beaumont's fifth season in 1969–1970 featured four American plays: The Time of Your Life, Camino Real, Operation Sidewinder, and Beggar on Horseback. Montgomery resigned in April 1970, a year after his appointment. The sixth season in 1970–1971 was composed entirely of revivals and included The Good Woman of Setzuan, The Playboy of the Western World, An Enemy of the People, and Antigone.

The Beaumont still ran at a deficit, despite near-capacity attendance. Amyas Ames, who had become Lincoln Center's chairman in 1970, found the Beaumont Theater was losing $750,000 a year. Lincoln Center's directors forgave $200,000 of the repertory company's debts and agreed to provide another $125,000 a year to cover high overhead costs. In January 1971, City Center proposed taking over the Beaumont and conducting renovations. The plans included relocating the Forum behind the Beaumont's stage and adding three film screens in the Forum space. Mielziner opposed the plans, saying it would compromise the quality of the Beaumont's design, but supporters said the main auditorium would not be touched and that the Forum would only be relocated to a better location. That September, the New York City Board of Estimate approved $5.2 million for the renovations. After Irving testified against the plans the next month, the Lincoln Center Repertory Theater was given the chance to submit an alternate plan for the theater. The theatre company proposed selling 500 annual subscriptions of $1,000 to cover the remaining debt. City Center formally withdrew its plan in December 1971, citing the opposition.

Throughout the dispute over the planned renovation, the Lincoln Center Repertory Theater had scheduled four shows for the Beaumont's seventh season in 1971–1972. Mary Stuart opened in late 1971, followed the next year by Narrow Road to the Deep North, Twelfth Night, and The Crucible. The musical Man of La Mancha, which was not part of the regular season, was revived in mid-1972 to large success. The Beaumont's 1972–1973 season featured Enemies, The Plough and the Stars, The Merchant of Venice, and A Streetcar Named Desire. By then, the Forum was mostly screening films. The Forum's season was canceled in October 1972 due to a lack of funds, and Irving resigned as the Lincoln Center Repertory Theater's artistic director as a direct result, claiming that "our dramatic heritage is being strangled by indifference". Lincoln Center had granted $150,000 to fund the Beaumont's eighth season but was unwilling to repeat the grant. With Irving gone, Lincoln Center's board decided that, for the 1973–1974 season, they would book a "guest season" of shows from regional theaters. The guest season would run for one year, allowing the Lincoln Center Theater to search for a new artistic leader and give them time to transition into the job.

=== Papp operation ===
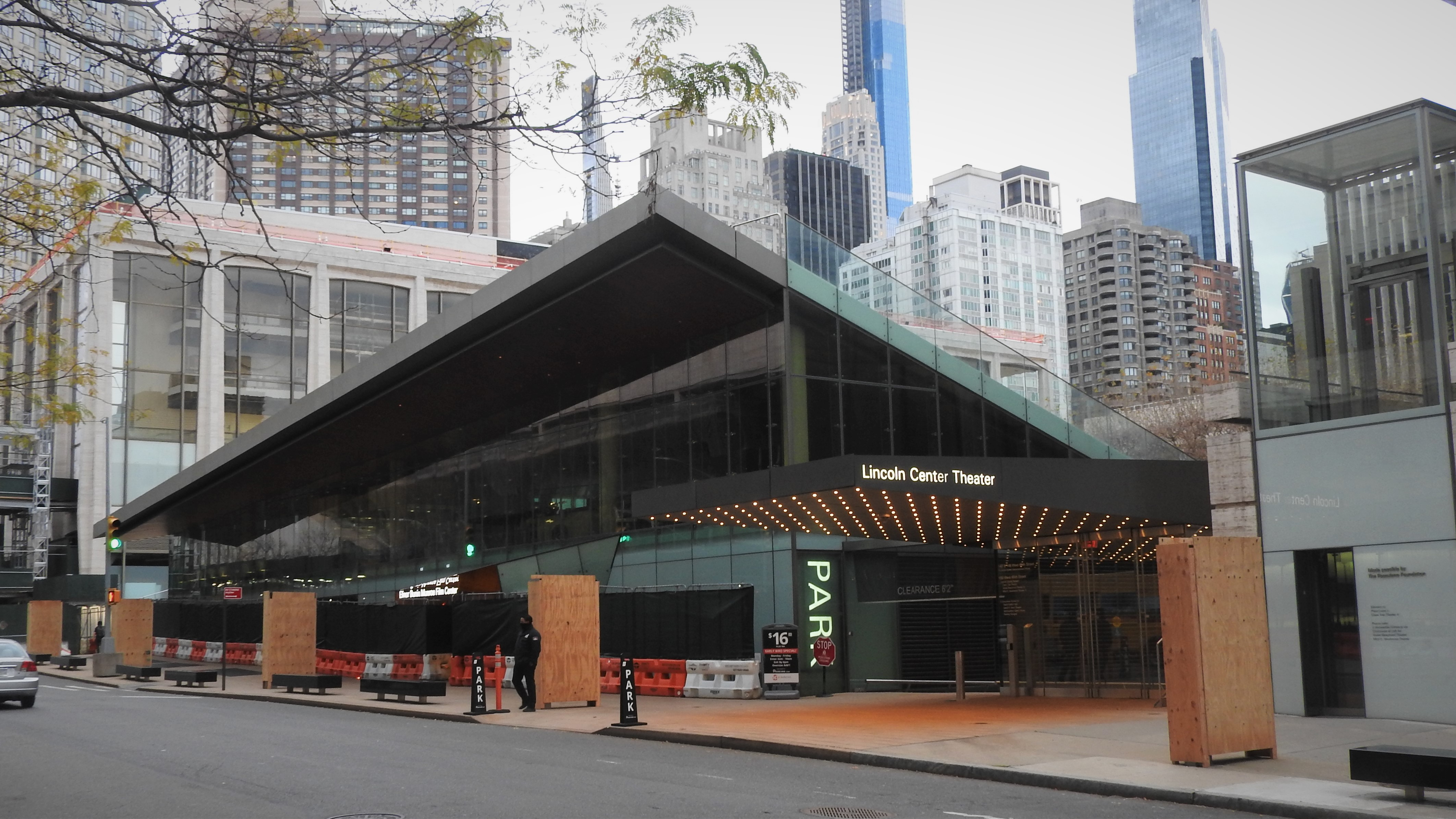
Side view of theater entrance

In March 1973, Joseph Papp of the New York Shakespeare Festival agreed to take over the Beaumont as long as he were able to raise $5 million. Papp used the Beaumont to present new productions and continued to stage experimental shows at the Public Theater Building. The Forum in the basement would be used for classical plays, a reversal of Irving's policy. Mitzi Newhouse gave Papp a grant of $1 million that May, the largest individual grant ever made for the Shakespeare Festival, and the Forum was named for Newhouse. The Shakespeare Festival's first production at the Beaumont, David Rabe's play In the Boom Boom Room, opened in November 1973 and was followed the next year by Hugh Miller's The Au Pair Man, Ron Milner's What the Wine Sellers Buy, and Miguel Piñero's Short Eyes. Of these, only Short Eyes was successful. During the 1974–1975 season, the Shakespeare Festival presented Anne Burr's Mert & Phil, Bill Gunn's Black Picture Show, Henrik Ibsen's A Doll's House, and Anthony Scully's Little Black Sheep. As with the previous season, these plays generally had only lukewarm reception. Visitors particularly disliked these two seasons because these productions were predominantly themed to sex and violence. The 1974–1975 season had had only 22,000 subscribers, compared with 27,000 during the 1973–1974 season.

Papp announced in early 1975 that he would change the Beaumont's programming to revivals of traditional plays and dramas with established performers. He also wanted to raise $3–4 million to renovate the Beaumont with a permanent proscenium stage. In accordance with his new policy, Papp scheduled four revivals for the 1975–1976 season: Trelawny of the "Wells", Hamlet, Mrs. Warren's Profession, and The Threepenny Opera. These plays were generally much more successful, and The Threepenny Opera was extended through the end of 1976. The lengthy run of The Threepenny Opera, as well as financial shortfalls, prompted Papp to delay the beginning of the following season to February 1977, canceling two of the four shows scheduled for the season. Anton Chekhov's play The Cherry Orchard and Aeschylus's classic Agamemnon were the only plays featured during that season. Papp presented plans for a $6.5 million renovation of the Beaumont to Lincoln Center's directors in April 1977. Giorgio Cavaglieri designed a new flexible auditorium, which if approved would be built during the 1978–1979 season.

Papp announced in June 1977 that he would no longer operate the Beaumont, citing increasing operating costs and expressing concerns about restrictions on artistic freedom. As a result, The Cherry Orchard was forced to close prematurely in August 1977, with Lincoln Center's directors warning that the theater might be closed for two years. At the time, even a successful season could incur a deficit of $2 million; the previous season had seen operating debts of $6.2 million and ticket sales of only $3.9 million. This was despite the fact that Papp had been able to reach 97 percent of audience capacity for many shows. The theater stayed closed even though there was an ongoing shortage of available theaters for new productions. Lincoln Center's directors said the Beaumont's operating expenses were twice as high as traditional Broadway theaters; it cost $1.55 million to mount a typical production at the Beaumont, compared to $930,000 at a typical Broadway theater.

=== Attempted revival ===
==== Crinkley operation ====
After Papp's sudden departure, Lincoln Center's directors hurried to make arrangements with other producers and theatrical companies to keep the Beaumont open. During its closure, the Beaumont held a benefit party for Paul Robeson in August 1977. American National Theater and Academy director Richmond Crinkley was named as the Beaumont's director in early 1978. At the end of the year, Woody Allen, Sarah Caldwell, Liviu Ciulei, Robin Phillips, and Ellis Rabb were appointed as the theater's new directors, and Edward Albee was hired as the in-house playwright. The Beaumont's directors leased the theater from Lincoln Center. The following May, the theater signed new contracts with Actors' Equity Association and the International Alliance of Theatrical Stage Employees that allowed the Beaumont to operate as a League of Resident Theatres' venue, thereby decreasing operating costs.

The theater's directors wished to raise $2 million in reserves before reopening the theater, and they wanted to operate for at least one full season. Consequently, the planned reopening in 1979 was pushed back by one year. Crinkley's team wanted to present classics alongside the occasional new production, and they wanted to focus on "American and English-language artistic heritage". The directors spent $2 million on improvements, including adding a rehearsal room below the stage and renovating the lobby. In July 1980, the directors announced the lineup for the 1980–1981 season, which began in October with a rehearsal of Philip Barry's comedy The Philadelphia Story. The two other plays that season were a revival of Macbeth and Woody Allen's The Floating Light Bulb; all three plays were poorly received. This prompted Crinkley to keep the theater closed after the 1980–1981 season, putting him in conflict with Lincoln Center chairman Martin E. Segal.

==== Canceled renovation and disputes ====
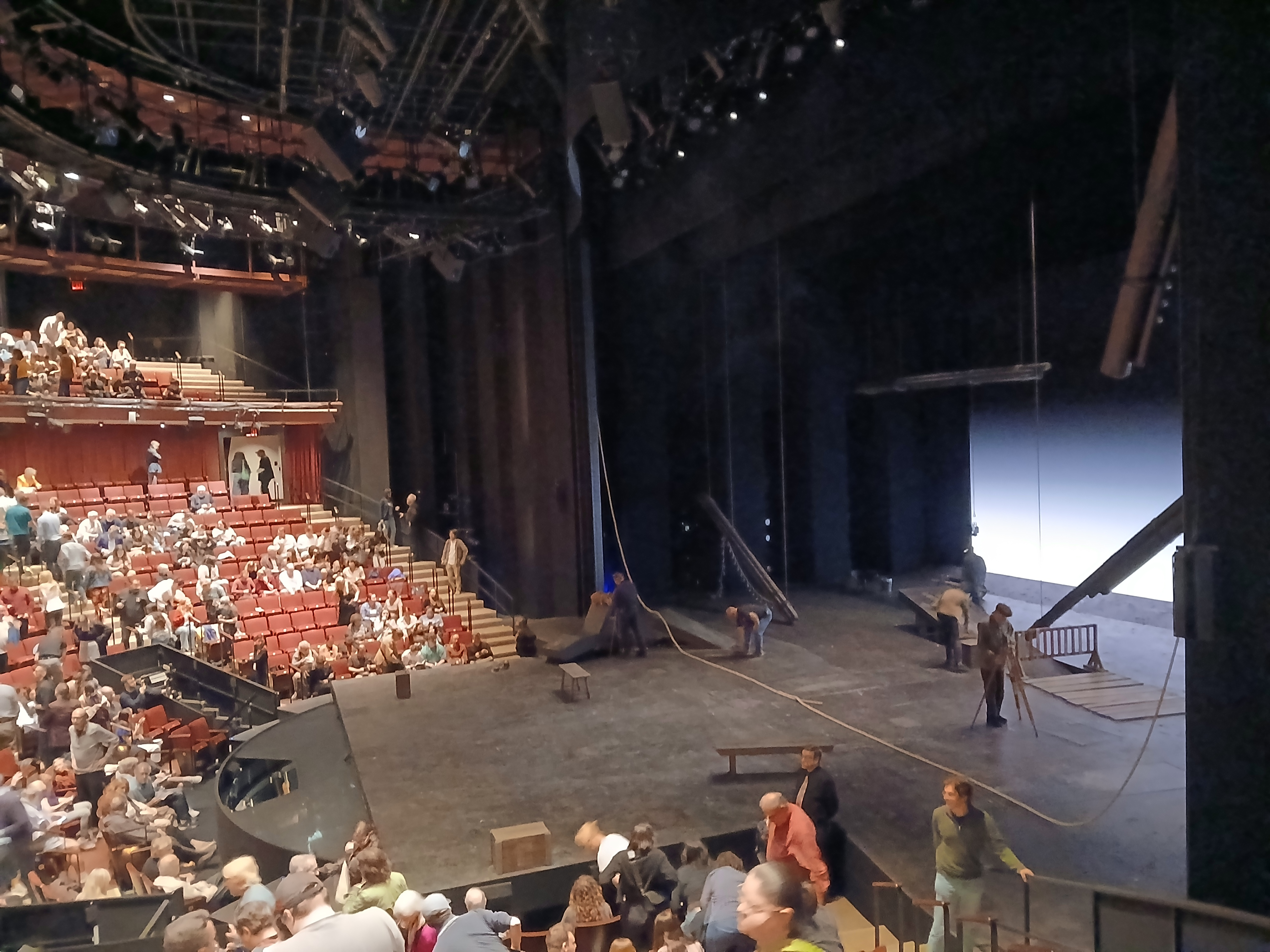
The thrust stage

During the Beaumont's closure, Crinkley suggested converting the Beaumont into a proscenium theater. This would resolve not only poor sightlines but also inferior acoustics that sometimes required the use of amplification. Furthermore, many classic plays were intended to be produced in proscenium theaters, and Crinkley wanted some shows from Washington, D.C.'s Kennedy Center (a proscenium theater) to be staged at the Beaumont as well. In May 1981, the Fan Fox and Leslie R. Samuels Foundation granted Lincoln Center $4 million each for the renovations of the Beaumont and State (now Koch) theaters. Frederick R. Koch had pledged $1 million to match the Fox/Samuels grant, and another board member of the Lincoln Center Theater had pledged $500,000. Acoustics expert Cyril Harris and architect I. M. Pei were hired to renovate the Beaumont. In addition to changes to the stage and proscenium opening, the theater would be rebuilt with a shallower raked floor, and the seating capacity would be increased to 1,200.

The Beaumont's renovation was planned to cost $6.5 million and begin in November 1981, but the renovation soon encountered delays, as Harris and Pei could not reconcile their disagreement over the proscenium opening's acoustic and esthetic features. Pei resigned from the project in February 1982 after he was unable to propose a design with which Harris agreed. As a result, Koch withdrew his $1 million grant. Though a new restoration architect was not appointed for several months afterward, Philip Johnson was reportedly working with Harris. Due to increasing renovation costs, Lincoln Center's board considered delaying the renovation indefinitely by mid-1982. The Fan Fox and Leslie R. Samuels Foundation withdrew its $4 million grant in November 1982. Leslie R. Samuels said the theater's directors had not raised enough money to cover the rest of the renovation, which had increased to $8 million. By then, Harris was no longer affiliated with the renovation.

Conflicts over the Beaumont's operation persisted through 1983. Lincoln Center's board prioritized reopening the Beaumont for shows, while the theater's directors wanted to renovate the auditorium first. Lincoln Center had requested that the Beaumont's board raise $3 million for a renovation before the end of 1983. Another point of contention was responsibility for maintenance; the NYPL was paying all maintenance expenses for the library–theater building while the Beaumont stood dark, which cost the library an additional $150,000 from 1981 to 1983. Crinkley even objected to the Lincoln Center board's decision in mid-1983 to book the musical La Tragedie de Carmen for the theater, because he had wanted the sole rights to book shows there. In August 1983, Lincoln Center's directors voted to prohibit the Beaumont's board from using either the "Lincoln Center Theater Company" name or $500,000 in annual funds. The Beaumont reopened that November with La Tragedie de Carmen. At the end of Carmen's run, Lincoln Center's restrictions against the Beaumont board were still in effect, prompting renewed discussions. The Greek National Troupe performed Oedipus Rex in 1984.

=== Lincoln Center Theater operation ===
The directors of Lincoln Center and the Beaumont reached an agreement in June 1984 in which the Beaumont's management would be reorganized in exchange for the lifting of restrictions. Ten board members and a new chairman would be hired, the Beaumont's board had to publish a detailed report about their goals, missions, and operations. Accordingly, former New York City mayor John Lindsay was appointed as the Beaumont's chairman in September 1984, and Crinkley stepped down the next month. Lindsay submitted a report at the end of that November, promising an "artistic purpose" and proposing a partnership with Juilliard. Gregory Mosher, who had seen the production of Carmen at the Beaumont, was hired as the Lincoln Center Theater's director in April 1985. Unlike his predecessors, Mosher believed the Beaumont could operate viably without being renovated. Bernard Gersten was appointed as the Beaumont's executive producer that June. Immediately after Mosher and Gersten took over, they discontinued the Beaumont's former practice of selling subscriptions for each season, instead selling memberships to the Lincoln Center Theater itself.

==== 1980s and 1990s ====
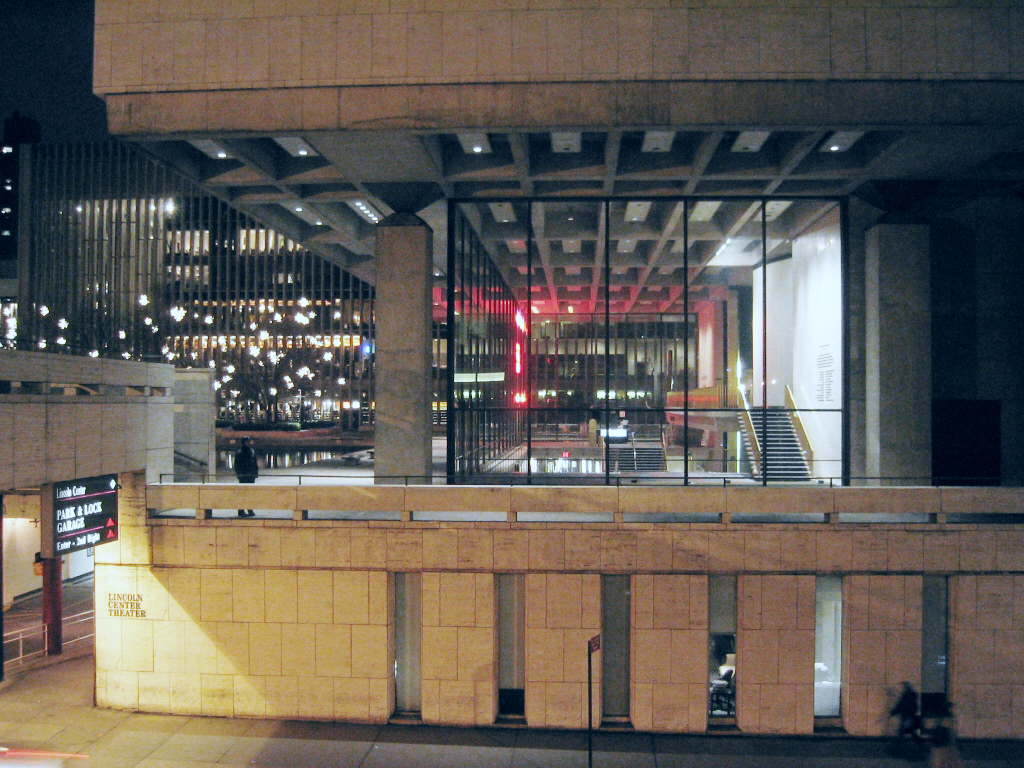
Seen in 2003

The Beaumont's leadership hosted a party at the theater in December 1985 to celebrate its upcoming reopening. The Flying Karamazov Brothers performed a live show at the Beaumont in April 1986, the first at the main auditorium under the new leadership. (Note: However, the first LCT production was at the Newhouse in December 1985.) It was followed the same month by a revival of John Guare's play The House of Blue Leaves, which transferred upstairs from the Newhouse. The 1986–1987 season was the first full season since 1980–1981. The season's offerings consisted of Ben Hecht and Charles MacArthur's comedy The Front Page; Wole Soyinka's drama Death and the King's Horseman; Bill Irwin's mime show The Regard of Flight and The Clown Bagatelles; and Robert Woodruff and The Flying Karamazov Brothers' version of The Comedy of Errors.

LCT made relatively minor changes to the theater in the late 1980s, spending $25,000 on handrails and having productions use the thrust stage. The next production, a revision of Cole Porter's musical Anything Goes, opened in October 1987 and ran for 804 performances over the next two years. LCT's 1988–1989 season was hosted at the Lyceum Theatre as a result of the extended run of Anything Goes. LCT also planned to raise $900,000 for further improvements to the Newhouse and Beaumont. The 1989–1990 season at the Beaumont consisted of two shows: a revival of Paddy Chayefsky's play The Tenth Man and a transfer of Richard Nelson's play Some Americans Abroad. The Beaumont was renovated between these engagements. The renovation cost $1.6 million and included repairing the roof and travertine surfaces, reupholstering the seats, and adding carpets and handrails. The Guare play Six Degrees of Separation opened at the Beaumont in November 1990, running for 485 performances.

LCT started booking solo engagements during nights when shows did not run, starting with Spalding Gray's Monster in a Box monologue in 1991. André Bishop replaced Mosher in early 1992; by then, Mosher described himself as "very tired", having taken only two 2-week vacations in 17 years. Afterward, Guare's play Four Baboons Adoring the Sun opened at the Beaumont in March 1992. The musical version of My Favorite Year opened that December, but it was not a success, and neither was a revival of Jane Bowles's In the Summer House in August 1993. Gray returned in November 1993 for his monologue series Gray's Anatomy, shortly before the play Abe Lincoln in Illinois opened; the engagements ran simultaneously. The theatre next produced a recreation of the Royal National Theatre production of Rodgers and Hammerstein's musical Carousel, which opened in March 1994, followed later the same year by another engagement of Gray's Anatomy. The theater hosted Tom Stoppard's play Arcadia and David Hare's play Racing Demon in 1995. Following complaints over poor acoustics, System for Improved Acoustic Performance installed 88 speakers and some microphones after Arcadia closed.

By the mid-1990s, the Beaumont was finally running a surplus. LCT had a $25 million annual budget and had sold all 41,000 subscriptions to the theater, with 12,000 people on a waiting list. In December 1995, LCT announced it would close the Beaumont for an extensive renovation lasting six to eight months, relocating Broadway shows to the Plymouth Theatre. The project was originally estimated to cost $4.7 million. The renovation, led by Hardy Holzman Pfeiffer Associates, involved modifying mechanical systems, improving acoustics, and adding accessible restrooms and seating areas. The work ultimately cost $6.2 million. The Beaumont reopened in November 1996 with the musical Juan Darién: A Carnival Mass. This was followed in 1997 by another revival of The Little Foxes as well as Ivanov. The next year, the theater hosted Eugene O'Neill's comedy Ah, Wilderness!; a revival of Shakespeare's Twelfth Night; and a short-lived musical version of Parade. The last productions of the decade were the revue It Ain't Nothin' But the Blues and the musical Marie Christine in 1999. In addition to these Broadway shows, Spalding Gray returned for two monologues: It's a Slippery Slope in 1996 and Morning, Noon and Night in 1999.

==== 2000s and 2010s ====
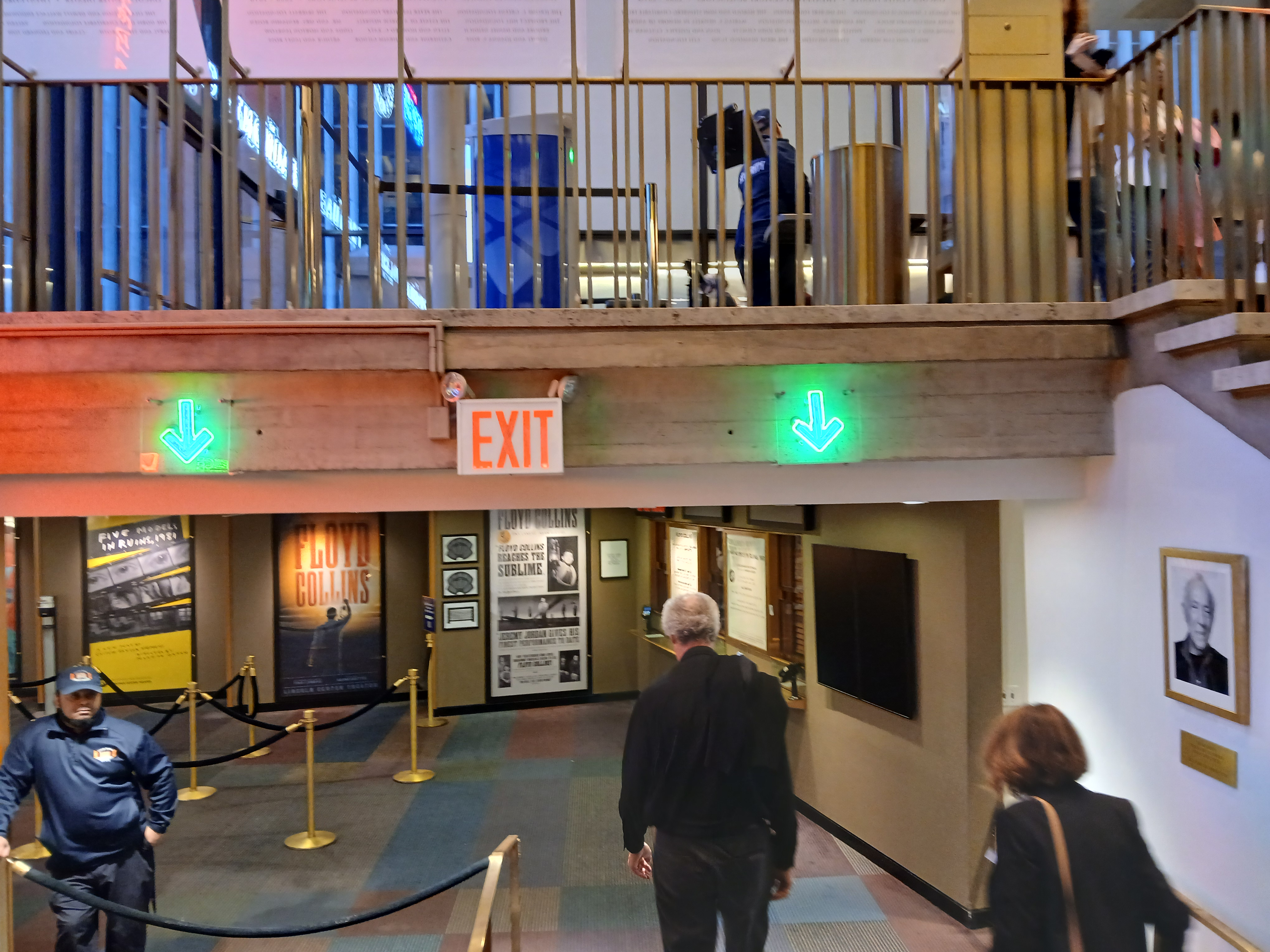
Stairs to the Newhouse Theater

Further modifications to the Beaumont were proposed in the early 2000s, when Lincoln Center planned to renovate the Beaumont's and Newhouse's lobbies for $58 million as part of a larger renovation of the complex. Susan Stroman's musical Contact opened in 2000 and ran for 1,010 performances. The Beaumont continued to host special productions, including concert series and one-time concerts. Two specials ran during Contact's engagement: Patti LuPone's concert series Matters of the Heart in 2000 and the play QED in 2001. Barbara Cook performed the concert series Mostly Sondheim in 2002, followed later that year by the play Dinner at Eight. The Beaumont's 2003–2004 season saw the opening of two Shakespeare revivals (Part 1 and Part 2 of Henry IV and King Lear), succeeded by another Barbara Cook concert. During late 2004, the Beaumont hosted the musical The Frogs and the play The Rivals.

A new entrance was added from 65th Street to the Beaumont Theater's plaza level as part of a mid-2000s renovation. The musical The Light in the Piazza opened at the Beaumont in April 2005, followed by Stoppard's three-part play The Coast of Utopia in 2006 and a revival of Shakespeare's Cymbeline in 2007. The Rodgers and Hammerstein musical South Pacific was revived in 2008, running for 1,000 performances. Guare's play A Free Man of Color had a brief run at the Beaumont in 2010. The next year, the play War Horse opened, running for 718 performances. Under Bishop's leadership, the Lincoln Center Theater also launched the LCT3 program, which sought to promote work by up-and-coming directors or playwrights. To host these shows, the Claire Tow Theater on the Beaumont's roof was approved in 2010, and the new venue opened in June 2012.

Bernard Gersten resigned as the theater's executive producer in 2012. The Beaumont hosted Holland Taylor's solo show Ann, as well as a revival of Macbeth, during 2013. James Lapine's play Act One premiered the following year. Next, a revival of the Rodgers and Hammerstein musical The King and I opened in April 2015 and ran for 499 performances. J. T. Rogers's play Oslo and Ayad Akhtar's play Junk were then performed during 2017, and Frederick Loewe and Alan Jay Lerner's musical My Fair Lady was revived at the theater for 509 performances in 2018. A single performance the musical Camelot took place at a benefit concert in March 2019, and Robert Schenkkan's comedy The Great Society had a limited run in late 2019.

==== 2020s to present ====
The theater was dark when the Broadway industry was shut down in March 2020 due to the COVID-19 pandemic in New York City. The Beaumont reopened on November 11, 2021, with previews of the musical Flying Over Sunset, which had a limited run; a limited revival of Thornton Wilder's The Skin of Our Teeth then opened at the Beaumont in April 2022. The theater hosted Mike Birbiglia's solo show Mike Birbiglia: The Old Man and the Pool from November 2022 to January 2023. It was followed in April 2023 by the musical Camelot, which ran for two months. After Bishop announced in 2023 that he would resign in two years, Lear deBessonet became LCT's artistic director and Bartlett Sher became the executive producer in 2024. The play Uncle Vanya opened in April 2024 for a two-month run. The next show at the Vivian Beaumont Theater, McNeal, opened in September 2024, running for two months. A fundraising-benefit performance of South Pacific took place at the Beaumont in December 2024, and the musical Floyd Collins opened there in April 2025 for a two-month run.

A revival of Ragtime opened at the theater in October 2025, running to August 2026. This will be followed by a revival of A Few Good Men opened for October 2026 for a limited run scheduled to last for 13 weeks. A revival of The Sound of Music is then is scheduled to open in April 2027 at the Vivian Beaumont for a limited 17-week run.

== Management ==
Lincoln Center Theater
- Lincoln Center Theater logo
- Formation: 1985
- Type: Theatre group
- Location: New York City
- Artistic director: Lear deBessonet
- Website: www.lct.org

Lincoln Center Theater (LCT) is the nonprofit organization that has operated the Beaumont since 1985, after the Beaumont's management was reorganized, with Gregory Mosher as the Director and Bernard Gersten as the Executive Producer. LCT operates the Beaumont, Newhouse, and Claire Tow theaters at Lincoln Center and occasionally produces plays and musicals in other theaters (on Broadway and elsewhere). André Bishop served as LCT's Artistic Director beginning in early 1992, replacing Gregory Mosher. LCT had no executive producer for several years after 2012, when Bernard Gersten retired from the position and André Bishop assumed the role of Producing Artistic Director. From 2025 onward, Lear deBessonet replaced Bishop as LCT's Artistic Director, while Bartlett Sher was named the Executive Producer.

LCT is one of four nonprofit theater companies to own and operate Broadway theaters, along with the Manhattan Theatre Club, the Roundabout Theatre Company, and Second Stage Theater. Consequently, all of the theatre company's revenue is used to finance operations or further productions. LCT mostly hosts its Broadway productions at the Beaumont but uses other theaters when the Beaumont is unavailable, starting in the 1988–1989 season. LCT's Broadway productions were also relocated during the Beaumont's 1996 renovation, as well as in the 21st century, such as during the runs of Contact, The Light in the Piazza, and South Pacific. LCT publishes the Lincoln Center Theater Review, where writers comment on LCT shows.

== Notable productions ==
The following productions are Broadway shows at the Vivian Beaumont Theater's main auditorium. This list does not include shows produced in the off-Broadway venues nor the Lincoln Center Theater's productions at other venues. Productions are listed by the year of their first performance.

Notable productions at the theater
Opening year	Name	Refs.
1965	Danton's Death	
1965	The Country Wife	
1966	The Condemned of Altona	
1966	The Caucasian Chalk Circle	
1966	The Alchemist	
1966	Yerma	
1967	Galileo	
1967	The Unknown Soldier and His Wife	
1967	The Little Foxes	
1968	Saint Joan	
1968	Tiger at the Gates	
1968	Cyrano de Bergerac	
1968	The Three Musketeers	
1968	George Dandin	
1968	Tartuffe	
1968	Lovers	
1968	King Lear	
1968	A Cry of Players	
1969	The Miser	
1969	The Time of Your Life	
1970	Camino Real	
1970	Operation Sidewinder	
1970	Beggar on Horseback	
1970	The Good Woman of Setzuan	
1971	The Playboy of the Western World	
1971	An Enemy of the People	
1971	Antigone	
1971	Mary Stuart	
1972	Narrow Road to the Deep North	
1972	Twelfth Night	
1972	The Crucible	
1972	Man of La Mancha	
1972	Enemies	
1973	The Plough and the Stars	
1973	The Merchant of Venice	
1973	A Streetcar Named Desire	
1973	In the Boom Boom Room	
1974	Short Eyes	
1975	Black Picture Show	
1975	A Doll's House	
1975	Trelawny of the "Wells"	
1975	Hamlet	
1976	Mrs. Warren's Profession	
1976	The Threepenny Opera	
1977	The Cherry Orchard	
1977	Agamemnon	
1980	The Philadelphia Story	
1981	Macbeth	
1981	The Floating Light Bulb	
1983	La Tragedie de Carmen	
1984	Oedipus Rex	
1986	The Flying Karamazov Brothers	
1986	The House of Blue Leaves	
1986	The Front Page	
1987	Death and the King's Horseman	
1987	The Comedy of Errors	
1987	Anything Goes	
1989	The Tenth Man	
1990	Some Americans Abroad	
1990	Six Degrees of Separation	
1991	Monster in a Box	
1992	My Favorite Year	
1993	Abe Lincoln in Illinois	
1993	Gray's Anatomy	
1994	Carousel	
1995	Arcadia	
1995	Racing Demon	
1996	Juan Darién: A Carnival Mass	
1997	The Little Foxes	
1997	Ivanov	
1998	Ah, Wilderness!	
1998	Twelfth Night	
1998	Parade	
1999	It Ain't Nothin' But the Blues	
1999	Marie Christine	
2000	Contact	
2001	QED	
2002	Dinner at Eight	
2003	Henry IV, Part 1 and Part 2	
2004	King Lear	
2004	The Frogs	
2004	The Rivals	
2005	The Light in the Piazza	
2006	The Coast of Utopia	
2007	Cymbeline	
2008	South Pacific	
2010	A Free Man of Color	
2011	War Horse	
2013	Macbeth	
2014	Act One	
2015	The King and I	
2017	Oslo	
2017	Junk	
2018	My Fair Lady	
2019	Camelot	
2021	Flying Over Sunset	
2022	The Skin of Our Teeth	
2022	Mike Birbiglia: The Old Man and the Pool	
2023	Camelot	
2024	Uncle Vanya	
2024	McNeal	
2025	Floyd Collins	
2025	Ragtime	
2026	A Few Good Men	
2027	The Sound of Music	

== See also ==
- List of Broadway theaters
- List of works by Eero Saarinen
