= The Invisible Hand (play) =

Poster of UK Premiere at The Tricycle Theatre

The Invisible Hand is a play written by playwright, novelist, and screenwriter Ayad Akhtar. The play centers around American banker Nick Bright, specializing in the Pakistani futures market, who is kidnapped by a terrorist organization looking to protect local community interests. It examines the nature of greed and pits the pervasive philosophy of capitalism against Islamic fanaticism, revealing unifying human passions, underlying tensions, and failings that span the ideological spectrum.

The play received its world premiere as a one-act play at The Repertory Theatre of St. Louis in 2012. The play then was produced in an expanded two-act version at A Contemporary Theatre in Seattle and the New York Theatre Workshop. The Invisible Hand had its London premiere at the Tricycle Theatre in 2016 with a revised second act. The New York production received an OBIE Award for playwriting and won the Outer Critics Circle John Gassner Award. The Invisible Hand had its regional premiere at American Stage Theatre Company in St. Petersburg, FL. In 2022, The Invisible Hand was produced at LORT theatre, Gulfshore Playhouse in Naples, FL, directed by Kristen Coury.

== Plot ==
Mistaken for his boss, futures trader Nick Bright is kidnapped by an organization in Pakistan, led by Imam Saleem, that is trying to effect positive change for Pakistan's local citizens. At the opening of the play, Nick befriends his jail guard, Dar, and convinces him to use the supply and demand chain in Pakistan to make some extra money trading potatoes on the side. Dar's complicity with the prisoner upsets his captor, Bashir, but also gives him the idea of using Bright's financial knowledge to benefit the terrorist group. When the Imam Saleem is placed on the US terrorism list, the possibility of a healthy ten-million-dollar ransom becomes impossible. Leveraging his knowledge of financial market, Nick comes to an arrangement with Bashir and the Imam to allow him to raise his ransom on the stock market, during which time he will teach Bashir how to manage the financials of his organization.

Using the information available to them, Nick teaches Bashir about the futures market and how one hedges bets on a small, remote laptop. As money and information begin to flood into the terrorist organization, supposedly benchmarked for the people of Pakistan, tensions begin to rise between Bashir and the Imam. This conflict culminates in the Imam testing Bashir's will at the end of the first act, reminding him of his position and loyalty. The evening after this terrifying confrontation, Nick escapes his prison.

Recaptured in the second act, Nick has lost any trust in both Bashir and the Imam as their conflict intensifies. Covert money transfers and laundering schemes are developed and loyalties to the cause of the Pakistani people come under siege. Nick finds himself in the middle of a battle within the organization. As the government begins to monitor the group's activity, Nick suggests to the Imam that he park their cash in illiquid assets, such as real estate. Bashir subsequently follows the Imam, discovering him purchasing real estate with his wife and casting doubt onto his distribution of their newfound wealth. In a decisive move, Bashir throws a coup and overthrows the Imam, leaving Nick with no clear ally. At the end of the play Bashir reveals that he has put Nick's teachings to good use, taking the entire Pakistani currency hostage. Nick has earned his ransom and his freedom, and Bashir leaves him a free man—in the middle of a war zone.

== Cast ==
The world premiere at the Repertory Theatre of St. Louis had a cast of John Hickok as Nick, Ahmed Hassan as Dar, while Bhavesh Patel played Bashir and Michael James Reed played James and the Guard. The production was directed by Seth Gordon and the creative team had a scenic design by Scott Neale, costume designer by Lou Bird, lighting design by Ann Wrightson, sound design by Rusty Wandall and was stage managed by Champe Leary.

The West Coast Premiere production at A Contemporary Theatre had Connor Toms playing Nick, Erwin Galan playing Dar, Elijah Alexander performing the role of Bashir and William Ontiveros playing Imam Saleem. The production was directed by Allen Nause and the creative team included a scenic design by Matthew Smucker, costume design by Rose Pederson, lighting design by Kristeen Willis Crosser, sound design by Brendan Patrick Hogan and the production was stage managed by JR Welden.

Poster from NYTW Production

The New York premiere included Justin Kirk as Nick, Jameal Ali as Dar, Usman Ally as Bashir, and Dariush Kashani as Imam Saleem. The production was directed by Ken Rus Schmoll and had scenic design by Riccardo Hernandez, costume design by ESOSA, lighting design by Tyler Micoleau, sound design by Leah Gelpe, Dialect Coach Stephen Gabis, fight direction by Thomas Schall and was stage managed by Megan Schwarz Dickert.

The Tricycle Theatre Cast included Daniel Lapaine as Nick, Sid Sagar as Dar, Parth Thakerar as Bashir, and Tony Jayawardena as Imam Saleem. The production was directed by Indhu Rubasingham and the design team included design by Lizzie Clachan, lighting design by Oliver Fenwick, and sound design by Alexander Caplen.

The following table shows the casts of the principal original productions:

Role	A Contemporary Theatre	New York Theatre Workshop	Tricycle Theatre
Nick	Connor Toms	Justin Kirk	Daniel Lapaine
Dar	Erwin Galan	Jameal Ali	Sid Sagar
Bashir	Elijah Alexander	Usman Ally	Parth Thakerar
Imam Saleem	William Ontiveros	Dariush Kashani	Tony Jayawardena

== Production history ==
Theatre	Opening Date	Closing Date	Details	Perfs.
Repertory Theatre of Saint Louis	March 7, 2012	March 25, 2012	World Premiere	?
A Contemporary Theatre	September 4, 2014	September 28, 2014	West Coast Premiere	?
New York Theatre Workshop	November 19, 2014	January 4, 2015	New York Premiere	?
Tricycle Theatre	May 18, 2016	July 2, 2016	London Premiere	?
American Stage Theatre Company	May 31, 2017	June 25, 2017	Regional Premiere	?
Gulfshore Playhouse	March 26, 2022	April 16, 2022	Naples, FL	?

== Awards and nominations ==
=== Off-Broadway Production ===
Year	Award	Category	Nominee	Result
2015	Obie Award	Acting	Usman Ally	Won
2015	Obie Award	Playwriting	Ayad Akhtar	Won
2015	Outer Critics Circle Award	John Gassner Award	Ayad Akhtar	Won
2015	Henry Hewes Design Award	Scenic Design	Riccardo Hernandez	Won
2015	Lucille Lortel Awards	Outstanding Play	Ayad Akhtar	Nominated
2015	Lucille Lortel Awards	Outstanding Director	Ken Rus Schmoll	Nominated
2015	Lucille Lortel Awards	Outstanding Lead Actor in a Play	Usman Ally	Nominated
2015	Lucille Lortel Awards	Outstanding Lighting Design	Tyler Micoleau	Nominated
2015	Lucille Lortel Awards	Outstanding Sound Design	Leah Gelpe	Nominated

=== Premiere Production ===
Year	Award	Category	Nominee	Result
2012	St. Louis Critics Circle Awards	Outstanding New Play	Ayad Akhtar	Won
2012	Steinberg/ACTA Best New Play Award	Best New Play	Ayad Akhtar	Nominated

== Critical response ==
Book Cover from Little, Brown Edition

The Invisible Hand opened to widely positive reviews in all of its primary productions. Charles Isherwood of the New York Times described the New York Theatre Workshop production as a play that "raises probing questions about the roots of the Islamic terrorism that has rattled the world for the last decade and more." In the Seattle Times, Misha Berson notes that the play provides a "setup for a fierce psychological match, and a useful colloquy on the American dollar as a force for good and evil." Calvin Wilson of the St. Louis Post-Dispatch names Akhtar a "consummate entertainer" whose characters are "intriguingly balanced between reality and myth."

Elaborating on the themes within the play, Amitava Kumar writes in his review for The Guardian: "Akhtar doesn't hold back when it comes to exposing the gathering greed of the jihadists as the pair [Nick and Bashir] accumulate money, but ... it seems to humanize them. Look they're not dogmatic hotheads, the play seems to be saying. They're just like us. Which, depending on your viewpoint improves your opinion of the jihadists or lowers it of the whole of humanity."

Robert Hofler at The Wrap says that "Akhtar has written a financial thriller that is every bit as arresting and nail-bit inducing as J.C. Chandor's 'Margin Call.'" and further compares Akhtar to Shaw, Brecht, and Miller.
