= Junk: The Golden Age of Debt =

2016 play by Ayad Akhtar

Junk: The Golden Age of Debt is a 2016 play by Ayad Akhtar. It premiered at the La Jolla Playhouse in July 2016 and then on Broadway in 2017 and centers on a corporate takeover.

== Background ==
Described as a mix between a Shakespearean play and The Big Short, the play examines the point in American history when debt overtook value as the main route toward obtaining wealth. Although the characters are fictionalized, they are based upon real-life financial figures from the 1980s such as Michael Milken and others.

== Production history ==
Junk received a reading at the Vassar College Powerhouse Theater on June 26, 2015, directed by Doug Hughes.

The play premiered at the La Jolla Playhouse (California) from July 26 to August 21, 2016, directed by Doug Hughes.

The production opened on Broadway at the Vivian Beaumont Theater on October 5, 2017 in previews, and officially opened on November 2, 2017. The play closed on January 7, 2018 after 77 performances. The play was nominated for the 2018 Outer Critics Circle Award for Outstanding New Broadway Play. The play was nominated for the 2018 Tony Award for Best Play and Tony Award for Best Lighting Design in a Play.

== Characters and original cast ==
Role	La Jolla Playhouse (2016)	Broadway (2017)
Amy Merkin	Annika Boras	Miriam Silverman
Giuseppi Addesso	Benjamin Burdick	Charlie Semine
Corrigan Wiley/Union Rep/Curt	Tony Carlin	Tony Carlin
Robert Merkin	Josh Cooke	Steven Pasquale
Charlene Stewart	Zora Howard	Caroline Hewitt
Judy Chen	Jennifer Ikeda	Teresa Avia Lim
Murray Lefkowitz/Chen’s Lawyer	Jason Kravits	Ethan Phillips
Jacqueline Blount	Zakiya Iman Markland	Ito Aghayere
Boris Pronsky	Jeff Marlow	Joey Slotnick
Mark O’Hare/Merkin’s Lawyer/Union Worker	Sean McIntyre	Ted Koch
Leo Tresler	David Rasche	Michael Siberry
Israel Peterman	Matthew Rauch	Matthew Rauch
Raúl Rivera	Armando Riesco	Matthew Saldivar
Thomas Everson	Linus Roache	Rick Holmes
Devon Atkins/Waiter	Hunter Spangler	Nate Miller
Maximilien Cizik	Henry Stram	Henry Stram
Kevin Walsh	Keith Wallace	Phillip James Brannon

== Synopsis ==
Per the production’s official press release: "It's 1985. Robert Merkin, an executive of the investment firm Sacker Lowell, has appeared on the cover of Time Magazine. Referred to as 'America's Alchemist,' his statement that 'debt is an asset' has brought him significant attention. Promoting his belief in the reliability of markets, he aims to influence global finance."

JUNK is the story of Merkin's assault on American capitalism's holy of holies, the "deal of the decade," his attempt to take over an iconic American manufacturing company and, in the process, to change all the rules. What Merkin sets in motion is nothing less than a financial civil war, pitting magnates against workers, lawyers against journalists, and ultimately, pitting every one against themselves.”

== Awards and nominations ==
=== Original Broadway production ===
Year	Award	Category	Nominee	Result
2018	Outer Critics Circle Award	Outstanding New Broadway Play		Nominated
2018	Tony Awards	Best Play		Nominated
2018	Tony Awards	Best Lighting Design in a Play	Ben Stanton	Nominated
