= Ayad Akhtar =

American actor and playwright

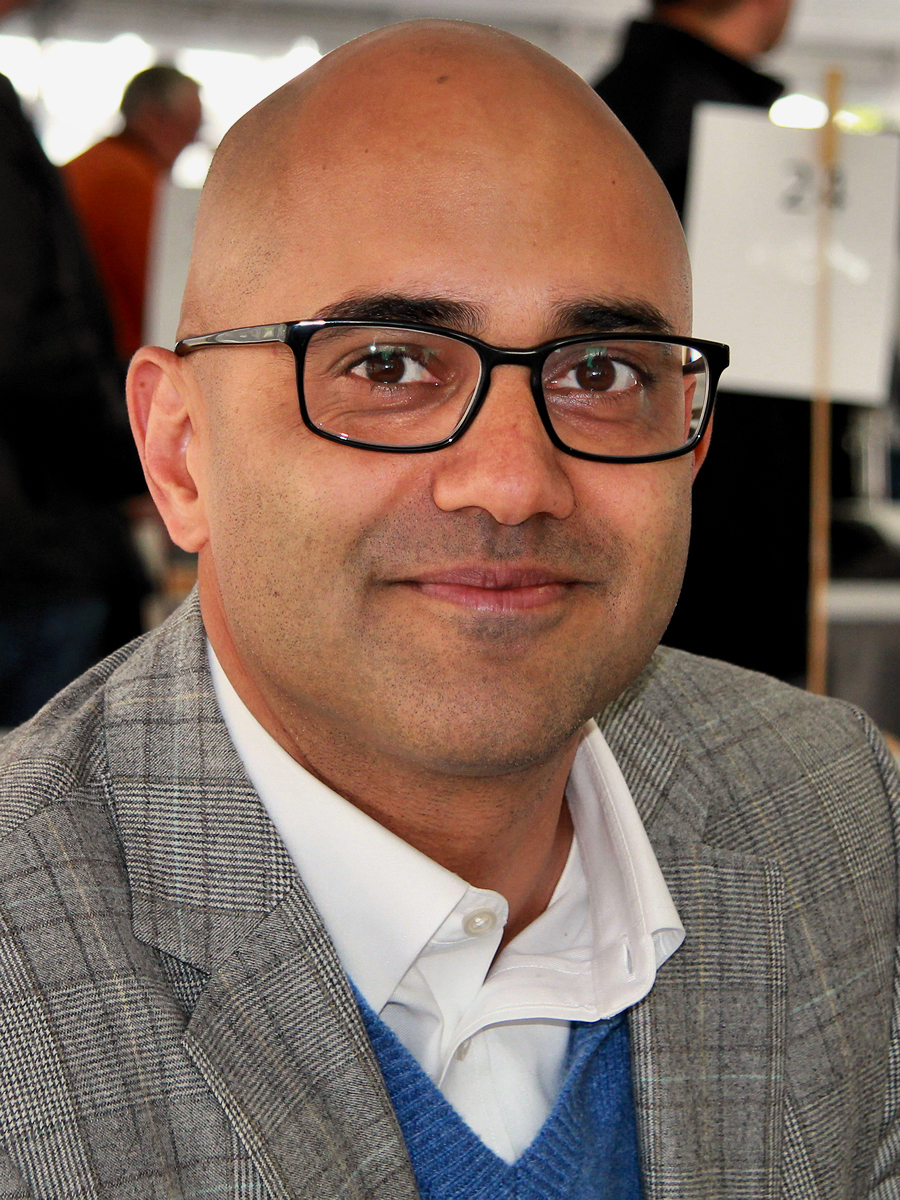
- Akhtar at the 2012 Texas Book Festival
- Born: October 28, 1970 (age 56); Staten Island, New York, U.S.
- Education: Brown University (BA); Columbia University (MFA)
- Occupations: Playwright, novelist, screenwriter
- Years active: 2002–present
- Notable work: American Dervish (2012); Disgraced (2012); Junk (2016); Homeland Elegies (2020)
- Awards: Pulitzer Prize for Drama; Award in Literature, American Academy of Arts and Letters; Steinberg Playwright Award
- Website: ayadakhtar.com

Ayad Akhtar (born October 28, 1970) is an American playwright, novelist, and screenwriter. He has received numerous accolades including the 2013 Pulitzer Prize for Drama as well as nominations for two Tony Awards.

Akhtar is known as a playwright covering various themes including the American-Muslim experience, racism, religion, economics, immigration, and identity. For his work on Broadway, Akhtar received Tony Award for Best Play nominations for Disgraced (2015) and Junk (2017). He also authored the plays The Who & The What, The Invisible Hand and McNeal. His plays have been produced on Broadway, off-Broadway, and in London.

He earned acclaim for authoring two novels American Dervish (2012) and Homeland Elegies (2020). He received numerous awards including the American Book Award for the latter. He co-wrote and starred in the political drama film The War Within (2005) for which he was nominated for the Independent Spirit Award for Best Screenplay. He portrayed Neel Kashkari in the HBO television film Too Big to Fail (2010).

== Early life and education ==
Akhtar was born in Staten Island, New York City to Pakistani parents, and raised in Milwaukee, Wisconsin. His interest in literature was initially sparked in high school. Akhtar attended Brown University, where he majored in theater and religion and began acting and directing student plays.

After graduation he moved to Italy to work with Jerzy Grotowski, eventually becoming his assistant. Upon returning to the United States, Akhtar taught acting alongside Andre Gregory and earned his Master of Fine Arts degree in film directing from Columbia University School of the Arts.

== Career ==
In 2012, Akhtar published his first novel American Dervish, a coming-of-age story about a Pakistani-American boy growing up in Milwaukee. The book was met with critical acclaim, described by The New York Times as "self-assured and effortlessly told." American Dervish has been published in over 20 languages and was a Kirkus Reviews best book of the year. Akhtar's narration of the audio book was nominated for an Audie Award in 2013.

Akhtar's first produced play, Disgraced, premiered in 2012 at the American Theater Company in Chicago; it was next staged at Lincoln Center Theater in New York. The play won the Obie Award and the 2013 Pulitzer Prize for Drama, and premiered at the Bush Theatre in London that spring. The play opened on Broadway at the Lyceum Theatre on October 23, 2014, and was nominated for the Tony Award for Best Play.

Akhtar's second play, The Who & The What, premiered at La Jolla Playhouse in February 2014, followed by a run at Lincoln Center Theater in June. The Who & The What has since been produced around the world with notable productions in Berlin, Hamburg, and the Burgtheater in Vienna, Austria. The latter production has run for almost two years. Its lead, Austrian film star Peter Simonischek, won the Nestroy Award for Best Actor.

Akhtar's third play The Invisible Hand premiered at the New York Theatre Workshop in December 2014, a production which invited comparison to the work of Shaw, Brecht, and Arthur Miller. It won the Obie Award, the John Gassner Award, and was nominated for multiple Lucille Lortel Awards and the New York Drama Critics Circle Award. In May 2016, the play premiered in London at The Tricycle Theatre and received nominations for the Evening Standard and Laurence Olivier awards.

In 2016, American Theatre magazine declared Akhtar the most produced playwright in the country.

Akhtar's fourth play, Junk, premiered on Broadway at the Vivian Beaumont Theater, produced by Lincoln Center Theater, on November 2, 2017. It was nominated for the Tony Award for Best Play and was awarded the Edward M. Kennedy Prize for Drama. In his final interview Bill Moyers referred to Junk as "not only history but prophecy. A Biblical-like account of who's running America, and how." Moyers added: "Our times at last have found their voice, and it belongs to a Pakistani American: Ayad Akhtar."

In 2017, Akhtar won the Steinberg Playwright Award. In his acceptance speech at Lincoln Center Theater, later published in The New York Times, he explained why he believes the theater is more important now than it ever has been:

The theater is an art form scaled to the human, and stubbornly so, relying on the absolute necessity of physical audience, a large part of why theater is so difficult to monetize. It only happens when and where it happens. Once it starts, you can't stop it. It doesn't exist to be paused or pulled out at the consumer's whim. It can't be copied and sold. In a world increasingly lost to virtuality and unreality — the theater points to an antidote. [...] The act of gathering to witness the myths of our alleged origins enacted — this is the root of the theater's timeless magic.

Akhtar's second novel, Homeland Elegies, was published in September 2020 by Little, Brown and Company. According to the publisher's press release, the book is drawn from Akhtar's life as the son of Muslim immigrants; he blends fact and fiction to tell a story of belonging and dispossession about the world that 9/11 made. The New York Times named Homeland Elegies one of the 10 Best Books of 2020, calling the book "pitch perfect... virtuosic." The Washington Post, Time, Entertainment Weekly, and Publishers Weekly also named it one of the 10 best books of 2020, with the Post reviewer stating that he would not be "surprised if it wins [Akhtar] a second Pulitzer Prize." Slate, O, NPR, The Economist, and Kirkus Reviews named Homeland Elegies one of the best books of 2020. Barack Obama named it one of his favorite books of 2020. Homeland Elegies was shortlisted for the Andrew Carnegie Medals for Excellence in Fiction, and won the 2021 American Book Award. An eight-episode limited series of Homeland Elegies is in development at FX, starring Kumail Nanjiani and adapted by Akhtar and Oren Moverman, who will direct all the episodes.

Ayad Akhtar served as president of PEN America from 2020 - 2023. In 2021, Akhtar was named New York State Author by the New York State Writers Institute.

In 2023, it was announced that he would co-pen with Matthew Decker the libretto for the stage musical adaptation of Damien Chazelle's 2016 film La La Land, which will be directed by Bartlett Sher, with Justin Hurwitz and Pasek & Paul returning as songwriters.

In 2024 his latest play McNeal, surrounding the ethics of artificial intelligence, was produced on Broadway starring Robert Downey Jr. at the Vivian Beaumont Theatre in Lincoln Center. The play was published in The Atlantic in December 2024 with a foreword by Jeremy Strong.

== Style and recognition ==
His work has received two Tony Award nominations for Best Play, an Award in Literature from the American Academy of Arts and Letters and the Edith Wharton Citation for Merit in Fiction. Akhtar's writing covers themes including the American-Muslim experience, religion and economics, immigration, and identity. In 2015, The Economist wrote that Akhtar's tales of assimilation "are as essential today as the work of Saul Bellow, James Farrell, and Vladimir Nabokov were in the 20th century in capturing the drama of the immigrant experience."

== List of works ==
=== Theater ===
As a playwright

Year	Title	Venue	Ref.
2012	Disgraced	Claire Tow Theater, Lincoln Center	
2013	Disgraced	Bush Theatre, London	
2015	Disgraced	Lyceum Theatre, Broadway	
2014	The Who & The What	La Jolla Playhouse, Los Angeles	
2014	The Who & The What	Claire Tow Theater, Lincoln Center	
2015	The Invisible Hand	New York Theatre Workshop	
2017	The Invisible Hand	The Tricycle Theatre, London	
2016	Junk	La Jolla Playhouse, Los Angeles	
2017	Junk	Vivian Beaumont Theatre, Broadway	
2024	McNeal	Vivian Beaumont Theatre, Broadway	
TBA	La La Land	N/A	

=== Film ===
Year	Title	Role	Notes
2002	Life Document 2: Identity	Ahmad	Directed, Writer; Short film
2005	The War Within	Hassan	Co-wrote script
2006	Long After	Naseer	Short
2008	FCU: Fact Checkers Unit		Short

=== Television ===
Year	Title	Role	Notes
2011	Too Big to Fail	Neel Kashkari	HBO television film
2015-2017	Theater Talk	Himself	2 episodes
2022	Would I Lie to You? (US)	Himself	Episode: "Babysitting Lemurs"

== Awards and nominations ==
Year	Association	Category	Nominated work	Result	Ref.
2006	Independent Spirit Award	Best Screenplay	The War Within	Nominated	
2013	Pulitzer Prize for Drama		Disgraced	Won	
2013	Obie Award	Best Playwriting	Disgraced	Won	
2013	Outer Critics Circle	John Gassner Award	Disgraced	Nominated	
2013	Off Broadway Alliance Awards	Best New Play	Disgraced	Nominated	
2015	Tony Award	Best Play	Disgraced	Nominated	
2017	Nestroy Award	Best Play – Authors Prize	Disgraced	Won	
2015	New York Drama Critics Circle Award	Best Play	The Invisible Hand	Nominated	
2015	Obie Award	Playwriting	The Invisible Hand	Won	
2015	Outer Critics Circle	John Gassner Award	The Invisible Hand	Won	
2015	Lucille Lortel Award	Outstanding Play	The Invisible Hand	Nominated	
2016	Evening Standard Award	Best Play	The Invisible Hand	Nominated	
2017	Edward M. Kennedy Prize for Drama		Junk	Won	
2018	Tony Award	Best Play	Junk	Nominated	
2018	Outer Critics Circle Award	Best Play	Junk	Nominated	

== Honorary awards ==
Homeland Elegies

- The New York Times 10 Best Books of 2020
- The Washington Post 10 Best Books of 2020
- Time 10 Best Books - Fiction
- Publishers Weekly 10 Best Books of 2020
- An O Book of the Year
- A Kirkus Reviews Book of the Year
- A Slate Best Book of 2020
- A New York Public Library Best Book of the Year
- NPR: A Best Book of 2020
- Barack Obama: A Favorite Book of 2020
- 2021 Shortlisted for Andrew Carnegie Medals for Excellence in Fiction
- 2021 Wisconsin Library Association Literary Award
- 2021 American Book Award

American Dervish

- Named a Kirkus Reviews Best Book of the Year
- Named a Globe and Mail Best Book of the Year in Toronto
- Named a Shelf Awareness Best Book of the Year
- Named an O, The Oprah Magazine Book of the Year

General

- 2021 Edith Wharton Citation of Merit for Fiction
- 2019 Erwin Piscator Award
- 2017 Steinberg Playwright Award
- 2017 Award in Literature from the American Academy of Arts and Letters

== Bibliography ==
Books

- 2012 American Dervish. Little, Brown and Company
- 2020 Homeland Elegies. Little, Brown and Company ISBN 978-0316496421
- 2026 The Radiance. Simon & Schuster ISBN 978-1668078631

Plays

- 2013 Disgraced. Little, Brown and Company
- 2014 The Who & The What. Little, Brown and Company
- 2015 The Invisible Hand. Little, Brown and Company
- 2016 Junk: The Golden Age of Debt. Little, Brown and Company

== Translations ==
Ashraf Ibrahim Zidan translated Akhtar's Disgraced into Arabic under the title Al-Makhzi.
