= American Dervish =

2012 novel by Ayad Akhtar

- First image
- Author: Ayad Akhtar
- Language: English
- Genre: Bildungsroman
- Publisher: Little, Brown and Company
- Publication date: January 9, 2012
- Publication place: United States
- Pages: 352
- ISBN: 978-0-316-18331-4

American Dervish is a 2012 novel by Ayad Akhtar. The novel tells the story of a young Pakistani-American boy growing up in the American Midwest and his struggle with his identity and religion. The novel has been published in English, Italian (La donna che mi insegnò il respiro), Norwegian (Begynnelsen på et farvel), Dutch (De hemelverdiener), Danish (Tavshedens smerte), German (Himmelssucher) and Spanish (El aroma secreto del limón y las especias).

== Background ==
Author Ayad Akthar was raised in Brookfield, a suburb of Milwaukee, like his main character Hayat. As an adult, he often wondered how the lives of the women he had known in his childhood were affected by their faith. He decided to explore the idea through the novel: "My sense of the polarities at play for the Muslim women I saw in my childhood is a good part of what makes up the central story of American Dervish. In it, the brilliant and beautiful Mina Ali emigrates to America to rebuild her life after a terrible marriage and ugly divorce back in Pakistan. In America, living with her best friend's family, she transforms the lives of all she encounters. She is imbued with a spiritual force, the book's most powerful and inspiring agent of change. And yet she is a paradox: deeply devout, bound by her tradition, subject—in tragic ways—to a patriarchal order with which she struggles. In my novel, this is an unresolved tension, and one that I believe reflects a much larger picture, and one in which not only Muslims find themselves today." Inspired by authors like Herman Melville and Toni Morrison who use biblical references in their novels, he included passages from the Quran in his text. Akhtar finished the novel in 2010 and sent it to various publishing companies. Little, Brown and Company bought the manuscript for a six-figure sum the day after they received it.

== Plot summary ==
Hayat Shah, a young Pakistani American, lives in a suburb of Milwaukee with his unhappily married parents who are secular Muslims. His mother's best friend Mina and her son Imran come from Pakistan to stay with the family, escaping her ex-husband who threatens to take away Imran. Mina brightens the lives of the Shah family, becoming especially close with Hayat, telling him Sufi stories and teaching him the Quran. Hayat becomes obsessed with being a hafiz (someone who can recite the entire Quran from memory) after Mina tells him that the parents of hafiz are guaranteed a place in Paradise. Meanwhile, she meets Dr. Shah's best friend Nathan and falls in love with him. Nathan, who is Jewish, explores Islam and even expresses an interest in converting. Dr. Shah is an atheist and warns his best friend not to convert as he believes the local imam is only interested in money. When Hayat, Nathan and Dr. Shah go to the mosque to see the imam about Nathan converting, he preaches an anti-Semitic khutbah, devastating Nathan. Hayat is jealous when he realizes that Nathan and Mina are still planning on marrying. He sends a telegram to her ex-husband, revealing that Mina is marrying Nathan. Mina's family threatens to disown her if she marries him and Nathan moves away to Boston.

Dr. Shah angrily forbids his son to read the Quran and burns Hayat's copy, although he secretly reads it at school in his effort to become a hafiz. Against the Shahs' objections, Mina decides to marry Sunil, a divorced Pakistani man from Kansas. During her wedding, Hayat discovers from Farhaz that true hafiz recite the Quran in Arabic while he has only been learning it in English. As a result, Hayat gives up on the Quran for many years. After her marriage Mina realizes that her new husband is controlling and abusive; he forces her to move back to Kansas with him.

Eight years later when Mina is dying of cancer, Hayat finally confesses to her that he sent the telegram. She forgives him. After she dies, he sees Nathan and learns that the couple had been secretly keeping in contact.

== Characters ==
- Hayat Shah, an American boy of Pakistani descent, naive and curious.
- Dr. Naveed Shah, Hayat's father, is a doctor who does important MRI research. He is an atheist because of a difficult childhood with his abusive and ardently religious mother. He is unfaithful to his wife and is an alcoholic.
- Muneer Shah, Hayat's mother, is unhappy because of her husband's infidelities. She teaches her son to avoid antisemitism and to treat women with respect.
- Amina "Mina" Ali Suhail, Muneer's beautiful and intelligent best friend. Mina's deep faith has a great influence on Hayat.
- Imran Suhail, Mina's spoiled and lonely son. Imran is obsessed with his birth father.
- Dr. Nathan Wolfsohn, Dr. Shah's colleague and best friend, a kind and sensitive man.
- Ghaleb Chatha, a local pharmacist, pious and judgmental.
- Adnan Souhef, the local imam.
- Sunil Chatha, Ghaleb's cousin and a failed ophthalmologist. His first wife divorced him due to his erratic and abusive behavior.
- Farhaz Hassan, a 15-year-old boy who has memorized the whole Quran.
- Rafiq and Rabia Ali, Mina's parents.
- Rachel, Hayat's college girlfriend.
- Jason Blum, Hayat's best friend in elementary school.

== Major themes ==
Identity, assimilation and Muslim life are the major themes in the novel. Hayat struggles with his identity as a Muslim while Mina, his father and his mother all have different ideas of what being Muslim means. Akhtar has spoken of his desire to write a book that would address the American religious experience, but from the point of view of a Muslim boy.

== Reception ==
American Dervish received mainly positive reception from literary critics. The New York Times called it a "self-assured and effortlessly told" first novel. People called it "ambitious but accessible", and gave it 3.5 stars out of 4, saying that the book brought "resonance to universal questions of belief and belonging" Rayyan Al-Shawaf, in The Brooklyn Rail, called the work "near-revolutionary", characterizing it as an "unflinchingly conscientious examination of the fraught and much-manipulated subject of Muslim scripture." However, The Milwaukee Journal Sentinel compared the book unfavorably with James Joyce's A Portrait of the Artist as a Young Man.

Literary critics of Pakistani origin reviewed the book positively. Nazneen Sheikh, in Toronto's The Globe and Mail, called attention to the "faultless mimicry of the spoken language of a community of Pakistani immigrants in American suburbia." Amina Elahi of Divanee called the book a "brutally honest account of Pakistani-American Muslim beliefs and hypocrisy."
