= Lucille Lortel =

American actress

- Lucille Lortel in ca. 1920s by Achille Volpe
- Born: Lucille Wadler; December 16, 1900; Manhattan, New York City, U.S.
- Died: April 4, 1999 (aged 98); Manhattan, New York City, U.S.
- Occupations: Actress, theatrical producer, artistic director
- Years active: 1925–1999
- Spouse: Louis Schweitzer (1931–1971; his death)

Lucille Lortel (née Wadler, December 16, 1900 – April 4, 1999) was an American actress, artistic director, and theatrical producer. In the course of her career Lortel produced or co-produced nearly 500 plays, five of which were nominated for Tony Awards: As Is by William M. Hoffman, Angels Fall by Lanford Wilson, Blood Knot by Athol Fugard, Mbongeni Ngema's Sarafina!, and A Walk in the Woods by Lee Blessing. She also produced Marc Blitzstein's adaptation of Bertolt Brecht and Kurt Weill's Threepenny Opera, a production which ran for seven years and according to The New York Times "caused such a sensation that it...put Off-Broadway on the map."

== Early life and acting career ==
Lortel was born Lucille Wadler on December 16, 1900, at 153 Attorney Street on the Lower East Side of Manhattan, one of four children of Anny and Harris Wadler, Jewish immigrants of Polish descent. Her father was a manufacturer of women's clothes who frequently traveled to Europe to buy designs to copy. Lortel had two brothers, Mayo (a violinist) and Seymour, and a sister, Ruth. She was raised in the Bronx and Manhattan, where she was homeschooled until attending Adelphi University in Brooklyn, New York. Lortel was remembered by her friends as vivacious, outgoing, and flirtatious, and was known to be found dancing at parties well into her 80s.

In 1920, Lortel (her stage name) began to study acting and theatre at the American Academy of Dramatic Arts. In 1921, she briefly left the United States to continue her training under Max Reinhardt in Berlin. She made her Broadway debut in 1925 in the Theatre Guild's production of Caesar and Cleopatra alongside Helen Hayes. In 1926, she appeared in Michael Kallesser's One Man's Woman at the 48th Street Theatre in Manhattan. Lortel also appeared in David Belasco's The Dove, with Judith Anderson, and as Poppy in the touring company of The Shanghai Gesture, with Florence Reed. In 1929, Lortel played the female lead in The Man Who Laughed Last with star Sessue Hayakawa. She performed the role both on stage and on film in one of the first talking pictures.

In 1931, Lortel married paper industrialist and philanthropist Louis Schweitzer. In deference to her husband's concerns, she retired from acting in 1939.

== White Barn Theatre ==
In 1947, "after spending over 15 years looking for a way to express herself in the theater that was acceptable to her husband" (and at the urging of actor Danny Kaye), Lortel founded the White Barn Theatre in an old horse barn on her and her husband's estate in Westport/Norwalk, Connecticut. According to Lortel's wishes, the theater's mission was to present works of an unusual and experimental nature, existing as a sanctuary from commercial pressures, a place where writers could take a chance with their plays and where actors could stretch their talents.

Under Lortel's guidance, the White Barn premiered plays (many of which enjoyed successful transfers to commercial theatres) including: George C. Wolfe and Lawrence Bearson's Ivory Tower with Eva Marie Saint (1947); Seán O'Casey's Red Roses for Me (1948); Eugène Ionesco's The Chairs (1957); Archibald MacLeish's This Music Crept by Me Upon the Waters (1959); Edward Albee's Fam and Yam (1960); Samuel Beckett's Embers (1960); Murray Schisgal's The Typists (1961); Adrienne Kennedy's The Owl Answers (1965); Norman Rosten's Come Slowly Eden (1966); Paul Zindel's The Effect of Gamma Rays on Man-in-the-Moon Marigolds (1966); Terrence McNally's Next (1967); Ahmed Yacoubi's The Night Before Thinking (1974); Barbara Wersba's The Dream Watcher starring Eva Le Gallienne (1975); June Havoc's Nuts for the Underman (1977); David Allen's Cheapside starring Cherry Jones (which Lortel later co-produced at the Half Moon Theatre in London); and Jerome Kilty's Margaret Sanger: Unfinished Business, starring Eileen Heckart (1989). Ireland's famed Dublin Players performed for several seasons at the White Barn with Milo O'Shea.

Among the successful transfers to Off-Broadway from the White Barn Theatre were: Fatima Dike's Glasshouse, Casey Kurtti's Catholic School Girls, Diane Kagan's Marvelous Grey, and Hugh Whitemore's The Best of Friends. Transfers from the White Barn to Broadway include Cy Coleman and A.E. Hotchner's Welcome to the Club (which premiered at the White Barn as Let 'Em Rot) and Lanford Wilson's Redwood Curtain, later on television as a Hallmark Hall of Fame 1995 production. In September 1992, a storage area near the theatre was expanded and renovated to become the White Barn Theatre Museum. The final production at the White Barn took place 2002. In 2006, after a failed attempt to save the theater, the property was sold to a real estate developer for $48 million. The theater's legacy has been preserved by a Lucille Lortel Foundation grant to the Westport Country Playhouse, which now houses the Lucille Lortel White Barn Center.

== Lucille Lortel Theatre ==
In 1955, eight years after Lortel founded the White Barn, Schweitzer purchased Theatre De Lys at 121 Christopher Street in Greenwich Village for Lortel as a 24th wedding anniversary present. For her first production in her new theatre, Lortel reopened her White Barn production of the Marc Blitzstein translation of The Threepenny Opera. The production ran for seven years, and represented a seminal moment in the history of Off-Broadway theatre, winning the only Tony Award ever given to an Off-Broadway production. The production won a Special Tony Award for best Off-Broadway show and the Tony Award for Best Featured Actress in a Musical to Lotte Lenya. Scott Merrill was nominated for a Tony Award for Best Featured Actor in a Musical.

As Threepenny Opera continued and eventually concluded its run, Lortel produced many other plays, including Jean Genet's The Balcony in 1960, which won the Village Voice's Obie Award for best foreign play; Athol Fugard's The Blood Knot starring James Earl Jones; Christopher Fry's A Sleep of Prisoners; Seán O'Casey's I Knock at the Door, Pictures in the Hallway, and Cock-A-Doodle-Dandy; Charles Morgan's The River Line with Sada Thompson, Beatrice Straight, and Peter Cookson; and Tom Cole's Medal of Honor Rag. The theater provided a home for such plays as David Mamet's A Life in the Theater, Sam Shepard's Buried Child, and Marsha Norman's award-winning Getting Out.

On November 16, 1981, during the run of Tommy Tune's production of Caryl Churchill's' Cloud Nine, for which Tune won the Drama Desk Award for best director, the Theatre de Lys was renamed the Lucille Lortel Theatre. During the 1983/84 season, Lortel co-produced Michael Cristofer's The Lady and the Clarinet starring Stockard Channing, followed by Woza Albert!, which received an Obie Award. In 1985, she produced Win Wells' Gertrude Stein and a Companion starring Jan Miner and Marian Seldes in the roles they'd originated at the White Barn.

Gertrude Stein and a Companion was recorded and broadcast on the Bravo US and Bravo Canadian television networks. It received the National Education Film and Video Award for historical biographies and an Emmy Award. Other plays presented at the Lucille Lortel Theatre in the 1980s included Not About Heroes; Elisabeth Welch in Time To Start Living; The Acting Company's Orchards and Ten by Tennessee, which were presented by arrangement with Lortel; and the hit Groucho: A Life in Revue, which went on to play in London's West End. The decade ended with the hit production of Steel Magnolias which ran for 1,126 performances.

In 1992, Lortel produced Larry Kramer's The Destiny of Me which received the 1993 Lucille Lortel Award for Outstanding Play Off-Broadway from the League of Off-Broadway Theatres and Producers. That same season, the theater was home to the Circle Repertory Company's production of The Fiery Furnace, starring Julie Harris in her Off-Broadway debut. The theater housed her production of Jane Anderson's The Baby Dance, as well as Terrence McNally's Lips Together, Teeth Apart, and Nicholas Wright's Mrs. Klein (produced by Lortel) and Donald Margulies' Collected Stories, both starring Uta Hagen.

On October 26, 1998, Lortel unveiled the Playwrights' Sidewalk at the Lucille Lortel Theatre in order to create a permanent tribute to playwrights whose work has been performed Off-Broadway. As part of the Lucille Lortel Awards each year, one playwright is inducted to the sidewalk, having their name engraved into one of the bronze stars in front of the theater. She wanted the theater to continue after her death, so in 1999 transferred the Lucille Lortel Theatre to the Lucille Lortel Theatre Foundation, establishing a new policy of booking only not-for-profit productions.

== ANTA Matinee Series ==
During the mid-1950s, the board of directors for the American National Theater and Academy (this organization eventually evolved into the National Endowment for the Arts) was interested in creating a repertory theater of national standing. Lortel, then a member of the ANTA board, and feeling somewhat frustrated by the success of the Threepenny Opera (because she wanted to bring more plays into her theater), persuaded ANTA to instead support a matinee series as a "laboratory for innovation" based on the model of the work she was doing at the White Barn Theatre.

With the board's approval, Lortel opened the ANTA Matinee Series in the spring of 1956 at the Theatre de Lys. She served as the artistic director of the series and was committed to presenting a program free of commercial influence. Plays were chosen for the Matinee Series without regard for popular appeal, and no financial benefit was claimed if commercial interest did develop in the course of a production. The series was presented every Tuesday afternoon and ran for twenty years. Two productions that began in the Matinee Series went on to the Festival of Two Worlds in Spoleto, Italy: Tennessee Williams' I Rise In Flame Cried The Phoenix and Meade Roberts' Maidens and Mistresses at Home in the Zoo, the latter of which also played Off-Broadway.

Other significant productions of the ANTA Matinee Series included Helen Hayes in Lovers, Villains, and Fools; Eva Le Gallienne in Two Stories by Oscar Wilde: The Birthday of the Infanta and The Happy Prince; Siobhán McKenna in an experimental production of Hamlet; Peggy Wood in G.B. Shaw's Candida; a dramatic recital by Sybil Thorndike and Lewis Casson (married in real life); Walter Abel, Richard Burton and Cathleen Nesbitt in An Afternoon of Poetry; and Orson Bean in A Round with Ring.

== Other projects ==
Library of Congress

- Beginning in 1960, Lortel began a series of presentations at the Library of Congress which included: Seán O'Casey's Time To Go; Conrad Aiken's The Coming Forth by Day of Osiris Jones and The Kid; Eugène Ionesco's The Shepherd's Chameleon; Edward Albee's Fam and Yam; Anouilh's Medea; Margaret Webster's The Brontes; Mark Van Doren's The Last Days of Lincoln; Donald Hall's An Evening's Frost; Norman Rosten's Come Slowly Eden; Ring Lardner's A Round with Ring; P.J. Barry's Heritage; Robert Glenn's adaptation of John Steinbeck's The Long Valley; Tom Rothfield's Chekhov in Love; and, in 1984, Lortel's production of Samuel Beckett's new plays Ohio Impromptu, Catastrophe, and What Where, directed by Alan Schneider, which she later presented at the 1985 Edinburgh Festival and in London.

Broadway

- On Broadway, Lortel produced Seán O'Casey's I Knock at the Door at the Belasco Theatre (1957), was associate producer of the acclaimed revival of Tennessee Williams' A Streetcar Named Desire at the St. James Theatre in 1973, and, after its premiere at the White Barn Theatre, produced Lanford Wilson's Angels Fall at the Longacre Theatre, where it was nominated for a 1983 Tony Award for Best Play. She co-produced the Broadway production of As Is, which won the Drama Desk Award for Best Play. As Is was also nominated for the Tony Award for Best Play. In 1986, Lortel received her third Tony Award nomination for Best Play for Athol Fugard's Blood Knot.
- In 1988, Lortel received Tony Award nominations for producer in both the Best Musical and Best Play categories. She co-produced (with Lincoln Center Theater) the Best Musical nominee Sarafina!, Mbongeni Ngema's play about apartheid. Her production of A Walk in the Woods by Lee Blessing, which starred Sam Waterston and Robert Prosky, was the Best Play nominee and was chosen during its Broadway run to do a special performance at the Library of Congress for an audience that included members of the United States Senate and House of Representatives, then-Secretary of State George P. Shultz, Russian Ambassador Yuri Dubynin, and members of the foreign diplomatic corps while the Senate was in session debating ratification of the INF Treaty prior to the Moscow Summit. In November 1988, Lortel co-produced the London opening of A Walk in the Woods, starring Sir Alec Guinness and Edward Herrmann. The international production of A Walk in the Woods continued when Lortel took the Broadway company to the Soviet Union, where it opened in Moscow at the Pushkin Drama Theatre on May 19, 1989, and then went on to the Drama Theatre of Vilnius, Lithuania.

Off-Broadway

- While producing at her own theater, Lortel continued to produce at other Off-Broadway theatres. Highlights include her productions of The Beckett Plays at the Harold Clurman Theatre and Rockaby starring Billie Whitelaw at the Samuel Beckett Theatre on Theatre Row during the 1983/84 season. These productions were given a special citation by the New York Drama Critics' Circle. In 1996, Lortel produced Back on the Boulevard with Liliane Montevecchi at the Martin Kaufman Theatre.

Education

- Lortel established the Lucille Lortel Fund for New Drama at Yale University to support the production of new plays at the Yale Repertory Theater (the fund's premiere production was August Wilson's Fences). She established the Lucille Lortel Fellowship in Playwriting at Brown University in 1996.

== Awards and honors ==
1950–1979

- Lortel received the Greater New York Chapter of ANTA Award and the National ANTA Award in 1950, 1961, and 1962 for "pioneering work fostering playwrights, directors, and actors." Her productions of The Threepenny Opera (1956), Guests of the Nation (1958), and The Balcony (1960) received Obie Awards. She received a special citation from the Obie Awards "for fostering and furthering the spirit of the theatrical experiment" (1958) and the first Margo Jones Award (1962) for "significant contribution to the dramatic art with hitherto unproduced plays."
- In 1975, the League of Off-Broadway Theatres and Producers presented her with a plaque citing her distinguished achievement. On the same occasion, the Hon. Abraham Beame, Mayor of the City of New York, presented Lortel with a certificate of appreciation, and New York City Council President Paul O'Dwyer signed a city proclamation citing Lucille Lortel for her cultural contributions to New York City. In January 1976, Lortel was honored by the state of Connecticut's Governor, Ella Grasso, for her efforts to promote the work of women playwrights on behalf of the United Nations' International Women's Year. In 1979, Lortel received the Villager Award for pioneering spirit in Off-Broadway.

1980s

- On September 29, 1980, at an Actors' Fund benefit gala celebrating the 25th Anniversary of the Theatre de Lys, Lortel was presented with a Certificate of Merit from the City of New York, and the theatre was renamed Lucille Lortel's Theatre de Lys. On April 6, 1981, the Museum of the City of New York honored her with an exhibition proclaiming her "The Queen of Off-Broadway" (a title first given to her in 1962 by Richard Coe of The Washington Post). The exhibit inaugurated the Lucille Lortel Theatre Gallery in permanent recognition of her contribution to the theatre.
- Lortel received the Double Image Theatre Award in December 1981, and in March 1982 she was given the American Theatre Hall of Fame's Arnold Weissberger Award.
- The 38th volume of Theatre World is dedicated "To Lucille Lortel whose vibrant spirit and untiring efforts have made immeasurable contributions to all components of the theatre by discovering and encouraging new talents, and whose devotion to Off-Broadway provided the impetus for its proliferation." In 1983, Lortel was presented with a special scroll signed by all the members of the American Theatre Wing, and her caricature was placed among other theatrical luminaries on the wall at Sardi's.
- In 1985, she received the first annual Lee Strasberg Lifetime Achievement in Theatre Award during the 30th Anniversary celebration of the Lucille Lortel Theatre. At Yale University, Lortel established "The Lucille Lortel Fund For New Drama", an endowment that supports the production of new theatre works. In honor of her support of new playwrights and drama, Yale Repertory Theatre's Artistic Director Lloyd Richards presented Lortel with the framed, autographed artwork for the program of August Wilson's Fences, which was the first play to be nurtured by her fund for new drama. Fences became the most honored Broadway play in history (at that point), winning the Pulitzer Prize, four Tony Awards, as well as Drama Desk, New York Drama Critics Circle and Theatre World Awards. Also in May 1985, Lortel received an Honorary Doctorate of Fine Arts from the University of Bridgeport. In June 1985, critic Clive Barnes presented Lortel with the 1985 Special Theatre World Award for her continuing discovery and encouragement of new talent.
- In 1986, the League of Off-Broadway Theatres and Producers established the Lucille Lortel Awards in her name to honor outstanding productions and individual achievements in each current Off-Broadway season. (For a complete listing of recipients please go to www.lortelawards.com.) In November 1986, The Players Club saluted Lortel as "The First Lady of Off-Broadway" in a special evening presided over by José Ferrer with Joseph Papp acting as Master of Ceremonies. Lortel (along with Colleen Dewhurst and others) was honored by the Women's Project with an Exceptional Achievement Award and by the Catholic Actors Guild with the George M. Cohan Award.
- In May 1987, Fairfield University bestowed an Honorary Degree of Doctor of Humane Letters upon Lortel in recognition of her pioneering the cause of new drama and its artists. She became the first resident of Westport to be honored by the Connecticut Commission on the Arts when she was presented with the 1987 Connecticut Arts Award recognizing her distinguished career as an actress, producer and artistic director.
- The Lucille Lortel Theatre Collection, an archive of theatrical history and personal memorabilia, donated by Lortel, is on permanent exhibition at the Westport Public Library. This exhibition includes the 1988 Emmy Award presented to her as Executive Producer of the teleplay Gertrude Stein and a Companion.
- On April 10, 1989, the Graduate Center of the City University of New York inaugurated The Lucille Lortel Distinguished Professorial Chair in Theatre, the first theatre chair to be named for a woman, and later in the spring she was honored by The New York Public Library as a Lion of the Performing Arts, a distinctive group of people whose work is well represented in the vast collections on dance, music, and theatre in The Performing Arts Research Center at Lincoln Center. Honors continued to come Lortel's way with receipt of a plaque from The New England Theatre Conference in November 1989.

1990s

- In 1990 Lortel was inducted into the American Theater Hall of Fame along with Joseph Papp and Lloyd Richards; and was given the rarely presented Actors Fund Medal of Honor during ceremonies at "The Lucille Lortel Off-Off-Broadway" Theatre located in the Actors' Fund Extended Care Facility in Englewood, New Jersey.
- Lortel was honored on May 20, 1991 with a reception in Governor Lowell Weicker's residence in Hartford, Connecticut, on the occasion of the establishment of the White Barn Theatre Museum.
- A major exhibition of her theatrical memorabilia entitled "The Theatres of Lucille Lortel" was shown in the Vincent Astor Gallery of the New York Public Library for the Performing Arts at Lincoln Center from October 21, 1991, through January 4, 1992.
- Honorary Lifetime Membership in the New England Theatre Conference was conferred upon Lortel on November 9, 1991, "in recognition of her outstanding contribution to theatre in New England, the country, and the world".
- On February 27 and 29, 1992, Lortel received back-to-back honors—she was presented with the Lifetime Achievement Award from The Christophers in New York and the Kennedy Center Medallion from the American College Theatre Festival in a ceremony at Fairfield University.
- Shivaun O'Casey, daughter of Seán O'Casey, and Artistic Director of The O'Casey Theatre Company, presented the first Seán O'Casey Award to Lortel on June 22, 1992 "in honor of all her work for the theatre, for the writers and the artists, and for her many productions (15) in this country of Sean's early as well as later works".
- On May 6, 1993, Lortel received the Drama League's annual "Unique Contribution to Theatre" Award, and later that month, in the company of Ralph Ellison and Andrew Heiskell, was the recipient of an Honorary Doctorate of Fine Arts from the City University of New York during the annual commencement of the Graduate School and University Center at Town Hall.
- The September 1993, Greenwood Press (Westport, Connecticut) publication of Lucille Lortel: A Bio-Bibliography by Sam McCready was celebrated with book parties at the Westport Public Library and at the New York Public Library for the Performing Arts at Lincoln Center where a permanent tribute to her career is on display in the Lucille Lortel Room of the Theatre on Film and Tape Archive (since November 1990, the home and viewing facility for TOFT's collection of more than 2000 tapes of Broadway, Off-Broadway and regional theatre productions).
- On Saturday, October 5, 1996, Lortel was a member of the first group of individuals (including Bella Abzug, Ed Koch and Leontyne Price) to be inducted into the Greenwich Village Hall of Fame. The 14th Annual Helen Hayes Award was presented to Miss Lortel by Hayes' son, James MacArthur, on Monday, November 26, 1996. The exhibition on her career, "The Queen of Off-Broadway" (displayed in the White Barn Theatre Museum in 1996), was mounted in the lobby of the Miller Theatre on the Columbia University campus during February 1997, at the Westport Historical Society's Wheeler House in conjunction with the June 28 cabaret evening that honored Lortel and the 50th Anniversary of the White Barn Theatre.
- On November 17, 1997, playwright Arthur Miller delivered the first Lucille Lortel Lecture on Playwriting at Columbia University School of the Arts. The Lee Strasberg Theatre Institute honored Lortel in December with plaques installed in the New York and Los Angeles schools commemorating "her vision and generosity in making possible the preservation of the Lee Strasberg Lecture Archives". She received the League of Professional Theatre Women/NY's Lifetime Achievement Award at Sardi's on December 16, which was Lortel's 97th birthday.
- On April 17, 1998, John Cardinal O'Connor presided over the dedication and unveiling of a plaque naming The Lucille Lortel Lobby of St. Clare's Hospital and Health Center at 415 West 51st Street in New York's Theatre District.

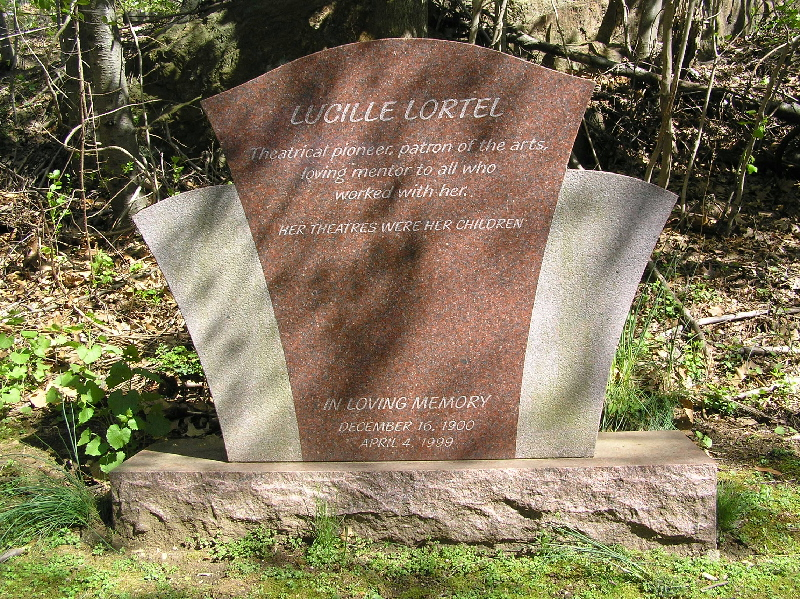
The headstone at Lucille Lortel's grave in Westchester Hills Cemetery

== Death ==
On April 4, 1999, Lortel died at the age of 98 after a brief hospitalization in Manhattan's Presbyterian Hospital. She is buried in Westchester Hills Cemetery in Hastings-on-Hudson, New York.
