= Funnyhouse of a Negro =

1964 one-act play by Adrienne Kennedy

- Written by: Adrienne Kennedy
- Characters: Sarah; Duchess of Hapsburg; Queen Victoria Regina; Jesus; Patrice Lumumba; Sarah's Landlady; Raymond; The Mother
- Original language: English
- Genre: Drama, one-act play

Premiere
- Date premiered: January 14, 1964; 62 years ago
- Place premiered: East End Theater, NYC

Funnyhouse of a Negro is a one-act play by Adrienne Kennedy. The play opened off-Broadway in 1964 and won the Obie Award for Distinguished Play. The play shared this award with Amiri Baraka's Dutchman, and was influenced by her radical imagination; critics have read it in conversation with both the Black Arts Movement and the Theater of the Absurd. While the play has been produced on stage numerous times, it has been more frequently studied in academic settings than it has been produced.

== Summary ==
The play tells the story of a young woman named Sarah living in New York City, and focuses on Sarah's internal struggle with her racial identity. She spends much of the play grappling with her feelings about her mixed ancestry; she idolizes her white mother and despises her black father. To demonstrate this internal struggle, Kennedy transforms the stage into a manifestation of Sarah's mind and uses historical figures to represent Sarah's mixed black and white ancestry. These characters are manifestations of Sarah's self, and include Queen Victoria, the Duchess of Hapsburg, Patrice Lumumba, and Jesus Christ.

The play was written during the Black Arts Movement of the 1960s and early 1970s, which had a strong masculine element. Kennedy's female perspective was a rarity for the time and the movement. Funnyhouse of a Negro takes place in Sarah's mind, allowing the audience to witness the anxiety, entrapment, and alienation of being a black woman in the United States. Kennedy focuses on the obsession with whiteness and the struggle of mixed ancestry, and the audience ultimately witnesses the complete fragmentation of Sarah's self.

== Plot ==
The play opens with a dreamlike sequence of a woman in a white nightgown with long, dark hair crossing the stage. The woman, who the audience later learns is Sarah's mother, carries a bald head in her hands. A white curtain opens, revealing Sarah's bedroom. The play takes place in Sarah's mind, with her room as a symbol for her obsession with whiteness. The white statue of Queen Victoria on the stage is a symbol of whiteness.

The first scene is between Queen Victoria and the Duchess of Hapsburg, with Sarah's room representing the Queen's chambers. This gives the audience an understanding of the permeability of the set, as it constantly takes on new forms for its various inhabitants. The two women discuss whiteness, with the Queen stating: "My mother was the light. She was the lightest one. She looked like a white woman." Their conversation is not their own words, but the words of Sarah. The Queen and Duchess embody Anglo-American culture and are a manifestation of Sarah's white self.

The conversation between the Queen and Duchess is interrupted by the woman from the opening sequence's knocking and yelling about how she should have never let a black man touch her. This is how we first learn of Sarah's hatred towards her black father. The scene shifts into one of Sarah's monologues, and ends with a comment from the landlady, who is one of the few characters who exists outside of Sarah's mind and therefore one of the few manifestations of reality in the play. The landlady helps the audience to understand Sarah's situation, explaining how her father killed himself when Patrice Lumumba was killed. The landlady says that Sarah hasn't left her room since her father's death, and that Sarah claims her father did not actually hang himself, but rather, she "bludgeoned his head with an ebony skull that he carries about with him. Wherever he goes, he carries black masks and heads." The scene ends with the landlady's comments about how Sarah's hair has fallen out and how she always knew that Sarah wanted to be someone else. This scene introduces us to the motif of hair, which recurs throughout the play. There is also a persistent knocking sound in the background for the rest of the play, representing the father's attempts to return to Sarah's life.

The next scene is between the Duchess and Raymond, the funnyman of the funnyhouse. The two characters discuss the Duchess' father, who is actually Sarah's father, as the Duchess is an extension of Sarah. They call the father a "wild beast" who raped Sarah's mother, and compare his blackness to the mother's whiteness. Finally, the Duchess reveals that the mother is currently in an asylum and is completely bald; this explains the significance of the opening sequence of the play. The audience also learns that the Duchess' hair is falling out; this implies that Sarah's hair is falling out, because her white self cannot coexist with her black self.

The next scene contains a speech by Lumumba, a manifestation of Sarah's black self. His character is unknown to the audience, and he holds a mask in his hands. The speech discusses how Sarah is haunted by her bald mother in her sleep, blaming Sarah's father for her plight into insanity, saying, "Black man, black man, my mother says, I never should have let a black man put his hands on me."

The next scene begins with a movement sequence between the Duchess and Queen, in which they discover that the Queen's hair has fallen out on her pillow, and the Duchess tries to place hair back onto her head. As they continue to pantomime, Lumumba's character returns for another monologue, in which he gives more information about Sarah's life. The audience learns that Sarah is a student at a city college in New York, and that she dreams of being surrounded by European antiques and having white friends. He also explains that Sarah's black father was given mixed messages about his identity by his parents. His mother wanted him to go to Africa and save the race, while his father told him that "the race was no damn good." Lumumba's speech ends with the claim that Sarah's father tried to hang himself in a Harlem hotel, but leaves ambiguity as to whether he died.

The next scene is between the Duchess and Jesus in the Duchess' palace. They are both bald, and express their fear surrounding the loss of hair. The scene begins with a movement sequence between the Duchess and Jesus, similar to that between the Duchess and the Queen, in which the two characters sit on a bench, attempting to brush the shreds of hair left on their heads. When they speak, they discuss how the father won't leave them alone. The landlady enters and tells a story about how Sarah's father asked her for forgiveness for being black, and she would not give him forgiveness. The scene ends with Jesus telling the Duchess that he plans to go to Africa to kill Patrice Lumumba.

The next scene takes place in a jungle, which covers the entire stage, while Sarah's bedroom remains in the background. Jesus appears, surrounded by the rest of the characters, all with nimbuses on their heads "in a manner to suggest that they are saviors". The group speaks in unison about how they believed their father to be God, but he is black. They speak of how his darkness killed the lightness, or Sarah's mother, and haunted Sarah's conception. Finally, they say that they are bound to the father unless he dies. They all rush to the grass in unison and repeat their chants, as the mother enters. They enact a conversation between Sarah and her father, in which he seeks forgiveness for being black, and Sarah asks him why he raped her mother then states how she wants to "bludgeon him with an ebony head." All of the characters run around the stage laughing and screaming until the blackout.

As the final scene begins, a new wall drops onto stage. A white statue of Queen Victoria acts as the representation of Sarah's room. Sarah appears in the light, "standing perfectly still, we hear the KNOCKING, the LIGHTS come on quickly, her FATHER'S black figure with bludgeoned hands rushes upon her, the LIGHT GOES BLACK and we see her hanging in the room." The landlady and Raymond enter, noticing Sarah's hanging body. The landlady remarks on the sadness of Sarah's situation, when Raymond says, "She was a funny little liar." He then says that her father never actually hanged himself, but rather, he is a doctor and married to a white woman, living the life that Sarah dreamed of having.

== Symbolism ==
The "funnyhouse" Kennedy addresses in Funnyhouse of a Negro is the madhouse of racism. Sarah is torn between the paradoxes of black and white, past and present, flesh and spirit. The play also dramatizes the sexual economy of racism that constructs blacks as hypersexual and culturally deficient. Additionally, Funnyhouse of a Negro demonstrates global citizenship from multiple perspectives: as Africans, as Americans, as women, and as women of color. At the time the play was written, there was a theme among black playwrights addressing a newly awakened social consciousness manifested in a movement to sustain or rebuild ties with Africa.

Kennedy's play seeks to deconstruct and disempower "thing white thing" by showing audiences haunting and perverse images of whiteness. Kennedy uses whiteface to interrogate perceptions of whiteness, a signifying strategy. Kennedy references blackface by using transracial mimicry. She revises the meaning of minstrelsy through enactment of white, rather than black, representation. The skin tone is envisioned as "whitish yellow" or "alabaster", illustrating that "pure whiteness" is a myth. Though Sarah is in whiteface, her "wild kinky hair" is highlighted, reminding the audience of who is beneath the mask. This is also a reminder of the miscegenated reality of blacks and whites in America. Additionally, the Queen and Duchess symbolize power, but are used to de-romanticize idealized perceptions of whiteness. They are white, but both have "kinky hair", demonstrating Sarah's identity conflict.

== Characters ==
Adrienne Kennedy's interest in foreign landscapes crystallized in 1960 while she was aboard the Queen Elizabeth to England, France, Spain, and Africa, and during this trip she drew inspiration for the characters in Funnyhouse of a Negro.

- Negro-Sarah: Sarah is the main protagonist of the play. The only facts given about her are that she is studying English at a city college in New York, works as a librarian, and lives in a brownstone in the West 90s of Manhattan, and that her mother was white and her father was black. Sarah spends the play confronting her multiracial identity, trying to latch onto her whiteness but failing to escape her blackness. The Duchess of Hapsburg, Queen Victoria, Jesus, and Patrice Lumumba all act as manifestations of Sarah's self.
- Duchess of Hapsburg (one of herselves): The Duchess of Hapsburg represents Sarah's racist subconscious, as her character is an emblem of European colonialism. She is also a manifestation of Sarah's desired sexuality. She is romantically involved with Jesus in the play, and spends most of her time on stage in the Queen's chambers. She loses almost all of her hair throughout the play. Her character has traditionally been played by a black woman wearing a white mask. Additionally, the Duchess of Hapsburg's personal history echoes the Sarah's mental condition. In 1864, Napoleon III appointed Carlota and her husband, Austrian Archduke Maximillian, to the Mexican throne. They were left penniless and powerless against Mexican revolutionaries. During her reign, the Duchess began to display signs of mental illness, which eventually descended into schizophrenia. Her husband was tried for treason and executed by revolutionaries, while Carlota was banished to the family's castle. Her story was portrayed in the 1939 film Juarez, which provided inspiration for Kennedy.
- Queen Victoria Regina (one of herselves): Queen Victoria Regina represents Sarah's obsession with whiteness and her repressed sexuality. Her character also lives on stage in the form of a statue. Like the Duchess of Hapsburg, she is an emblem of European colonialism. She is portrayed in the same manner as the Duchess, played by a black woman with a white mask. She also loses her hair throughout the course of the play. Historically, Queen Victoria was the Queen of the United Kingdom from 1837 to 1901 and the Empress of India from 1876 to 1901. Queen Victoria exemplifies the height of British colonial rule and the fragile life of a royal figure. She was a symbolic, rather than political, leader. She suffered familial distress and depression during her reign. The Queen's life symbolizes another form of masking. It is a mask of power that obscured the weakness of a constitutional monarchy.
- Jesus (one of herselves): Jesus, traditionally depicted as an emblem for Christianity, represents Sarah's disdain for her father. However, Kennedy's Jesus rebukes modern representations of a white, beautified Jesus. He is traditionally portrayed on stage by a black actor with either a white mask or painted yellow skin. Jesus is described as a "dwarf, dressed in white rags and sandals". He leads the selves into the jungle to kill Lumumba and also loses his hair throughout the course of the play. As a historical figure known for his martyrdom, Jesus's character is an integral element in the play's confrontation of racial identity and sacrifice. This character also challenges notions around Christianity's holiness. Kennedy's Jesus violates an insistence on binary constructs like good-evil, white-black, and normal-abnormal, an embodiment of dichotomies which addresses the problematic role of Christianity in the lives of the enslaved and colonized. According to Young, while Christianity symbolizes comfort and liberation, it is also a source of persecution and oppression. Jesus also represents Sarah's feelings about herself: stunted, deformed, and needy. He is the last of Sarah's inner selves to lose his hair, sealing her fate.
- Patrice Lumumba (one of herselves): Patrice Lumumba represents Sarah's self-hatred and is also a manifestation of Sarah's father. He carries an ebony mask throughout the play, alluding to African tradition. He also loses his hair throughout the course of the play; Lumumba reveals the secret to hair within the play. He proclaims, "For if I did not despise myself then my hair would not have fallen. Historically, Patrice Lumumba was the Prime Minister of the Republic of Congo from June 1960 to December 1960. He was executed by a firing squad, and both the United States and United Kingdom have been accused for conspiring in his murder. He was an activist for independence. With a death so influenced by imperialism, he is the opposite of Queen Victoria and the Duchess, who embody imperialism.
- Sarah's landlady (funnyhouse lady/Mrs. Conrad): The landlady is a white woman who runs Sarah's boarding house, and is one of the only two characters to exist in the reality of the play. She delivers monologues about Sarah's life, making her crucial for the audience, as she is one of the few characters who offers an objective view of Sarah. She discovers Sarah's body at the end of the play.
- Raymond (funnyhouse man): Raymond lives in the boarding house with Sarah, and she calls him her boyfriend. Raymond is a white, Jewish young man. Raymond likes Sarah because of her race, which upsets her. Sarah asserts, "I would like to lie and say I love Raymond. But I do not. He is very interested in Negroes". He is the only other character to exist in an objective reality, along with the landlady. He is with the landlady at the end of the play when she discovers Sarah's body, and ends the play by saying that her father never actually committed suicide. He also appears in the play as the funnyhouse man with the Duchess, revealing the role he plays in Sarah's subconscious.
- The mother: While Sarah's mother is never formally introduced in the play, she appears in the opening dreamlike sequence, as well as two other scenes in which she yells about being raped by Sarah's black father, claiming that she should have never let a black man touch her. Her mother represents all that is good and a victim of "blackness". The landlady reveals that the mother has lost all of her hair and lives in an insane asylum; she also haunts Sarah in her nightmares.

== Themes ==
Funnyhouse of a Negro addresses the themes of racial identity and mixed ancestry, as seen through the four manifestations of Sarah's self. The play's lack of plot and surrealistic elements are influenced by Kennedy's search for an expressive setting akin to dreams, inspired by her encounter with masks while living in Ghana, as well as various artistic movements of the time. The play uses masks, hair, and its set and props to evoke the mixed cultures being represented. By casting the white characters with black actors, Kennedy utilizes a form of reverse minstrelsy to represent Sarah's racial identity crisis.

Obsession with whiteness is also prominent in the play. Aside from the fact that her other selves are a ghostly white color, the way Sarah worships her mother for her light skin and long hair points to an obsession with whiteness. She states within the play that the only "acceptable" part of her is her yellow skin. This also ties into Sarah's obsession with her hair. Her hair is curly and wild, prominently showcasing her blackness. This may be a reason why Sarah, her mother, and Sarah's other selves all lose their hair in the play. Sarah's need to meet the white standards of society and not have black features overtakes her life and is the driving force behind her thoughts and actions.

Sarah's selves include both female and male characters, representing her internal divide not only between blackness and whiteness, but between femininity and masculinity. This helps relay the theme of both mental and literal imperialism in the play, as Sarah's mind and body are violated by foreign elements. The female fragments of Sarah's self are white European elegance and royalty, while the black fragments of herself are masculine martyrs. By contrasting Sarah's multiple genders and races, Kennedy adds complexity to Sarah's conflicting racial identity.

The theme of death is also prominent in the play. All of Sarah's selves are dead historical figures, and Sarah is haunted by the image of her father's death and mother's plight into insanity. Sarah also reveals her desire to kill her father, also seeking to kill the blackness inside of her. The father is portrayed in a way in which his touch is fatal, driving Sarah's mother to lose her sanity and ultimately driving Sarah to her own suicide. The opening sequence of the play presents deathly imagery, as the white curtain is described as being made of "a cheap material and a ghastly white, a material that brings to mind the interior of a cheap casket."

Sexuality is not prevalent in the play, as Sarah is repulsed by and fears to form any sort of union with her father. She expresses fear of being raped by her father because she believes he raped her mother. As the product of rape, Sarah's view of healthy sexual relationships is very stunted. Sexuality reveals itself through the Duchess and Jesus' interactions, as well as her interaction with Sarah's boyfriend, Raymond. The Duchess acts as the ultimate expression of Sarah's sexuality.

Hair is another important theme in Funnyhouse of a Negro. Hair defines the characters and illustrates Sarah's fate. Sarah's "wild kinky hair" is the only part of her physicality that identifies her as black. Her hair underscores the idea Sarah tried to disavow, then kill, the African-American part of her heritage.

== Psychological aspects ==
Funnyhouse of the Negro demonstrates how a person can be emotionally and mentally damaged by something that did not directly involve them. Sarah experiences self-hatred because of her blackness and what it represents in her life: her father; the man who raped her mother. The fact that Sarah's father kills himself because of her rejection serves to damage her further. The effect of having nobody to support her or tell her the truth of what happened between her mother and father (the end of the play implies that the story Sarah knew may not have been true) causes her to create multiple versions of herself to make sense of what was happening. To pathologize Sarah's experience in the play, both multiple personality disorder and schizophrenia seem possible. The audience cannot tell whether she is speaking out loud when she interacts with these characters, which would differentiate those two disorders. It is hard to distinguish whether or not the audience is experiencing the play through her head or if it is happening in the real world. Either way, Sarah has mental and emotional issues that ultimately lead to her death.

== Performance history ==
Professional theater:

- East End Theater, New York, January 1964
- Signature Theatre Company, October 1995
- Classical Theatre of Harlem, February 2006
- KC Melting Pot Theatre, Kansas City, May 2018.

College theater:

- Harlem School of the Arts, 2006
- Brown University, October 2008
- Brandeis University, February 2010
- Columbia University, Fall 2012
- Actors Studio Drama School at Pace University, Spring 2017
- Columbia University, Spring 2019

== Role in the Black Arts Movement and legacy ==
The Black Arts Movement in America was the "aesthetic and spiritual sister to the Black Power concept." The movement was dominated by masculine influences and an element of violence. Kennedy contributed her female voice to this movement by using the tactics of artists involved in the movement, such as reinventing language and forms, and by representing the experiences of black women. After Funnyhouse of a Negro won the Obie Award for Distinguished Play in 1964, Kennedy's work gained force not only within the Black Arts Movement but also among aspiring black female playwrights. Ntozake Shange, Aishah Rahman, Suzan-Lori Parks, and Robbie McCauley were all influenced by Kennedy.

Critics have noted that Kennedy's plays, specifically Funnyhouse of a Negro and its successor, The Owl Answers, offer "a plea for a more compassionate relationship between men and women in the black community", but the play also "urges black women artists to chart their own course — if necessary, even without approval from black male artists". Kennedy's play shows the vulnerability of the black woman, an experience that is still rarely represented in art and media. The play shows how black women suffer from their circumstances and that they are also susceptible to mental instability. Funnyhouse of a Negro encourages the audience to see black woman separately from the stereotypical independent black woman.

== Other plays by Kennedy ==
- The Owl Answers (1965)
- A Rat's Mass (1967)
- A Movie Star Has To Star in Black and White (1976)
- Black Children's Day (1980)
- Ohio State Murders (1991)
