= Timothy Mason (playwright) =

American playwright (1950–2023)

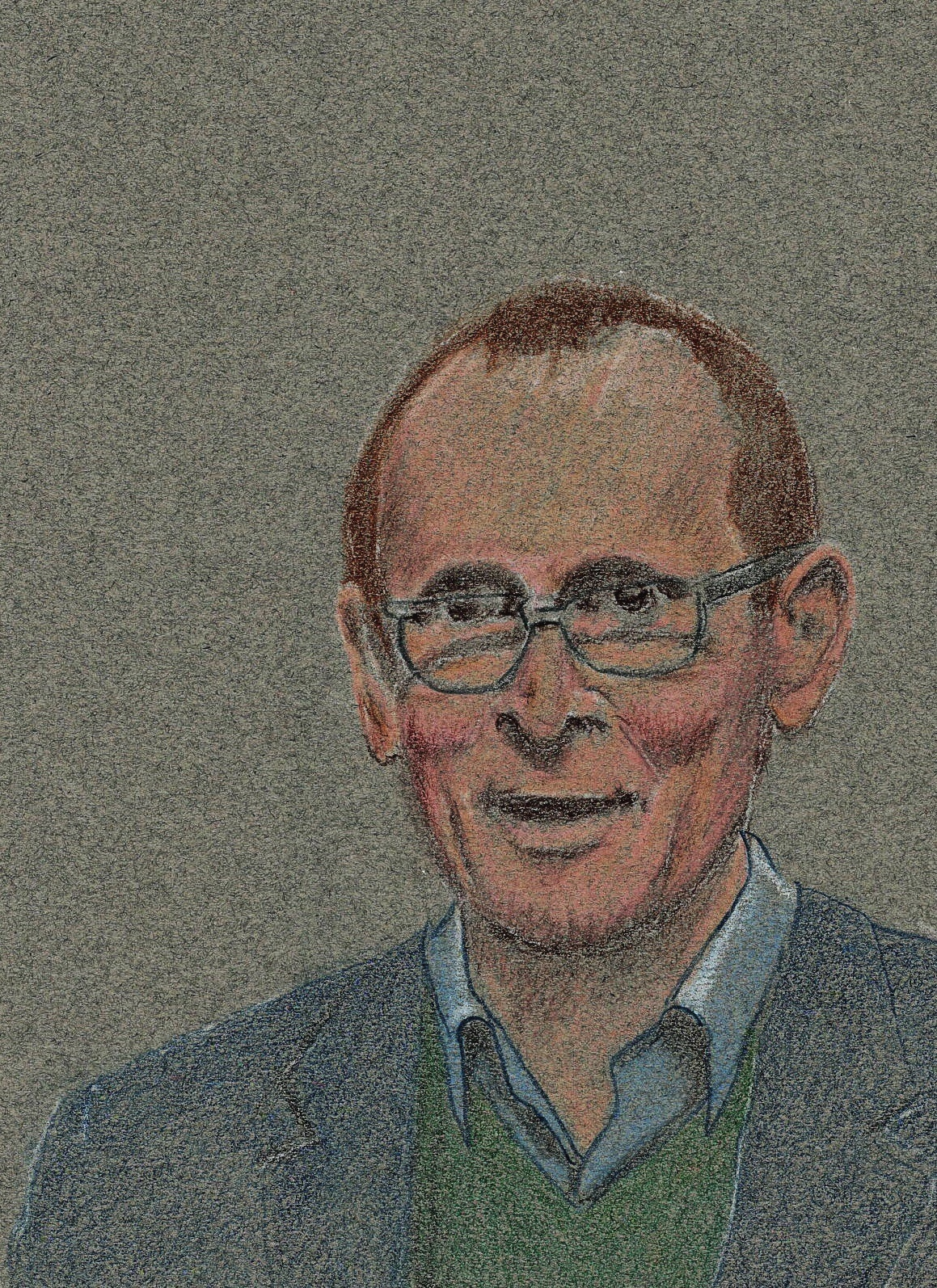
- Born: February 12, 1950; Sioux Falls, South Dakota
- Died: September 12, 2023 (aged 73); Minneapolis, Minnesota
- Website: timmasonauthor.com

Timothy Peter Mason (February 14, 1950 – September 12, 2023) was an American playwright. He wrote a number of plays, including Levitation, Only You, Babylon Gardens, The Fiery Furnace and Bearclaw. He also wrote the novels The Last Synapsid, The Darwin Affair, The Nightingale Affair, and the book and lyrics for the Broadway musical, Dr. Seuss' How the Grinch Stole Christmas!

== Bio ==
Timothy Mason was born in Sioux Falls, South Dakota. As a young child, he moved with his family to Minneapolis. He is the son of Reverend John Martin Mason II (1908 - 2003), who was an author, a minister, and who traveled the country as an advocate for the elderly. Timothy Mason's mother was Mertrice Rosalys (Herfindahl) Mason. While in high school Timothy Mason performed in a number of plays at the Children's Theatre Company of Minneapolis. He earned a degree at St. Olaf College in Northfield, Minnesota; and he also studied at Harris Manchester College, Oxford, England, in 1971. While in college he wrote plays for the Children's Theatre Company of Minneapolis, including Robin Hood a Story of the Forest and Kidnapped in London, which won the 1972 National Society of Arts and Letters Award.

== Playwriting and novels ==
Circle Repertory Company produced his plays Levitation, Only You, Babylon Gardens (starring Timothy Hutton and Mary-Louise Parker), and The Fiery Furnace (starring Julie Harris). His plays have also been produced by Actors Theatre of Louisville, South Coast Repertory, Seattle Repertory Theatre, Victory Gardens Theater, the Jungle Theatre of Minneapolis, the Old Globe, the Children's Theatre Company of Minneapolis, the Guthrie Theater Lab, in Minneapolis, Pioneer Memorial Theatre in Salt Lake City, and the Royal National Theatre, London.

He has been a resident playwright The Children's Theatre Company, Minneapolis, a company playwright at Circle Repertory Company in New York City and guest playwriting instructor at state universities in Minnesota, Oklahoma, Utah, Florida, and Arizona; as well as at New York University, and The New School in New York City.

Mason created a 5-play "Young Americans Cycle", which includes: Ascension Day, The Less than Human Club, Time on Fire, Mullen's Alley, and My Life in the Silents. The plays deal with the lives of young people at significant moments in history. The play cycle was commission by San Francisco's American Conservatory Theater’s Young Conservatory, and created in collaboration with Theatre Royal in Bath, England. The Young Conservatory is the first American theater company of young people to play London's Royal National Theatre as part of the National Theatre Connections — a collaboration that began in 2001 with Mason's Time on Fire.

Mason's published works include many of his plays, and also Timothy Mason: Ten Plays for Children From the Repertory of the Children's Theatre Company of Minneapolis, which features theatrical adaptations of classic works of children's literature; and the novels The Last Synapsid and The Darwin Affair.

His play Bearclaw was commissioned by the Actors Theatre of Louisville, it then premiered in 1984 at Lucielle Lortel's White Barn Theatre in Westport Connecticut, and was produced by Circle Repertory Company and Lucille Lortell. It was staged the following year by the Seattle Repertory Theatre, and it was then published in 1989 in The Best Short Plays of 1988-1989. Commissioned by the Actor's Theatre of Louisville, premiered at Lucielle Lortel's White Barn Theatre in Westport, Connecticut, and published in The Best short plays, 1988–1989 by The Fireside Theatre.

Mason has won a Kennedy Center Fund for New American Plays Award, the W. Alton Jones Foundation Award, the Hollywood DramaLogue Award, the Fellowship from the National Endowment for the Arts, The Berilla Kerr Playwrights Award, and the National Society of Arts and Letters Award.

== Plays ==
- In a Northern Landscape
- Levitation
- Bearclaw
- Only You
- Babylon Gardens
- The Fiery Furnace
- Before I Got My Eye Put Out
- Ascension Day
- The Less Than Human Club
- Time on Fire
- Mullen's Alley
- My Life in the Silents
- The Life to Come
- Dr. Seuss' How the Grinch Stole Christmas! The Musical
- Sorry
