= The Stronger (opera) =

Opera by Hugo Weisgall

The Stronger is an opera in one act by composer Hugo Weisgall. The English-language libretto by Richard Hart is based on August Strindberg's 1889 play of the same name. It premiered at the White Barn Theatre in Westport, Connecticut, on August 9, 1952, and was dedicated to that theatre's founder, the actress Lucille Lortel.

== About the opera ==
The Stronger is an approximately 25 minute staged duodrama that is in many respects a monologue with one singing role, Estelle (coloratura soprano), and one silent role, Lisa. The opera takes place at a bar on Christmas Eve. The two women meet at the establishment and Estelle talks to her friend Lisa about her family. In the course of the conversation Estelle informs Lisa that she knows that Lisa is in love with her husband Harold. As Estelle leaves the bar she comes to the conclusion that she, Estelle, is the stronger of the two women. But is she? Weisgall said of the opera:

From the first I regarded this piece as an experiment, a kind of operatic exercise. My primary task was to find ways to translate Strindberg’s psychological monodrama, with its rapid, constantly changing moods and its almost total lack of sustained moments, into musical terms. The chief problem was that the music had to function alternately as background and foreground—at times pure atmosphere, then shifting between characterizing the protagonist, Estelle, and picturing the physical movements of the wordless Lisa. Also I sought somehow to balance the two roles more equally. Rather than conform to the traditional theatrical interpretation in which “the star” plays the silent role and comes out on top, I tried to leave open the question as to which of the two women is really “the stronger.

== Performance history and recordings ==
The Stronger was first performed at the White Barn Theatre in Westport, Connecticut, for four performances in August 1952 by the Hilltop Opera Company of Baltimore, Maryland. The production used piano accompaniment, and soprano Eva Bober portrayed Estelle for three of the four performances. Weisgall had composed the work specifically for the group during the spring and summer prior to its premiere.

The first performance of the work with an orchestra (scaled for only 8 musicians) was given at the Composers Forum at Columbia University in New York City in January 1955 with soprano Adelaide Bishop and the Columbia Chamber Orchestra under the baton of Siegfried Landau. That 1955 performance was recorded and another recording of the opera was made with soprano Johanna Meier and the Aeolian Chamber Players on the New World Records label in 1972. Bishop also sang the role for the opera's New York City premiere in 1950 and directed the opera for a 1995 production starring soprano Darynn Zimmer at the White Barn Theatre. Soprano Joyce Mathis performed the work at the 92nd Street Y in 1969 in a concert organized by the League of Composers. The Baltimore Opera Company staged the work in 1985 in a triple bill titled "American Portraits" that also included Thomas Pasatieri's La Divina (1952) and the world premiere of Lee Hoiby's Italian Lesson.

Initially Weisgall had intended for The Stronger to be a work that could be performed as a pair with his opera The Tenor (1952). However, years later he determined that it would fit better as part of a trilogy with two other operas he composed: Purgatory (1958) and Will You Marry Me? (1989). The Stronger and Weisgall's The Golden Peacock were performed at the occasion of the latter work's premiere by the Opera Ensemble of New York with Cecelia Wasson as Estelle.
