= White Barn Theatre =

Theater in Norwalk, Connecticut

The White Barn Theatre was a theater founded in 1947 by actress and producer Lucille Lortel on her property in the Cranbury neighborhood in Norwalk, Connecticut. The theater premiered numerous plays by established playwrights that often continued to successful Broadway and Off-Broadway runs.

Lortel founded the theater on her 18.4-acre (74,000 m^{2}) estate at the corner of Cranbury Road and Newtown Avenue. The property is in both Norwalk and Westport, Connecticut, with about 15.5 acres (63,000 m^{2}) in Norwalk and 2.5 acres (10,000 m^{2}) in Westport. The location was sometimes referred to as Westport, which has more theater than Norwalk. Lortel later donated much of her memorabilia to the Westport Public Library.

The theater was created from an old horse barn on the estate, and seated 148. Lortel's aim was to present unusual and experimental plays, promote new playwrights, composers, actors, directors and designers, and to help established artists develop new directions outside of commercial theater.

== Plays ==
Plays produced at the White Barn include:

- George Wolf and Lawrence Bearson's Ivory Tower, featuring Eva Marie Saint (1947)
- Seán O'Casey's Red Roses for Me (1948)
- Hugo Weisgall's The Stronger (1952)
- Sean O'Casey's adapted by Arnold Perl I Knock at the Door (play) (1956)
- Eugène Ionesco's The Chairs (1957)
- Archibald MacLeish's This Music Crept by Me Upon the Waters (1959)
- Edward Albee's Fam and Yam (1960)
- Samuel Beckett's Embers (1960)
- Murray Schisgal's The Typists (1961)
- Adrienne Kennedy's The Owl Answers (1965)
- Norman Rosten's Come Slowly Eden (1966)
- Paul Zindel's The Effect of Gamma Rays on Man-in-the-Moon Marigolds (1966)
- Terrence McNally's Next (1967)
- Nathan Teitel's The Initiation, featuring Armand Assante and Lori March (1969)
- Ahmed Yacoubi's The Night Before Thinking (1974, produced by La MaMa Experimental Theatre Club)
- Paul Hunter's How Do You Live with Love (1975)
- Barbara Wersba's The Dream Watcher, featuring Eva Le Gallienne (1975)
- June Havoc's Nuts for the Underman (1977)
- David Allen's Cheapside, featuring Cherry Jones (Lortel later co-produced this play at London's Half Moon Theatre)
- Lynn Rogoff's Love, Ben Love, Emma starring Penny Allen (1984)
- Douglas Scott's Mountain (1988)
- Jerome Kilty's Margaret Sanger: Unfinished Business, starring Eileen Heckart (1989)

Transfers to Off-Broadway:

- Fatima Dike's Glasshouse
- Casey Kurtti's Catholic School Girls
- Diane Kagan's Marvelous Grey
- Hugh Whitemore's The Best of Friends

Transfers to Broadway:

- Cy Coleman and A.E. Hotchner's Welcome to the Club (premiered at White Barn as Let 'Em Rot)
- Lanford Wilson's Redwood Curtain (later on television as a Hallmark Hall of Fame 1995 production)
- Langston Hughes' Shakespeare in Harlem
- Dos Passos’ USA
- Katherine Anne Porter's Pale Horse, Pale Rider
- Tennessee Williams' The Purification

Writing for The New York Times about an event at the White Barn, Alvin Klein wrote that the August 25, 1996 gala, exhibition opening, stage performances, and reception was "the night of the year... memories are made of this!"

At another gala a year later (August 31, 1997), in celebration of the theater's fifty years and Lortel's career as a producer, Klein wrote in the Times, "[O]ver the years, Ms. Lortel — now in her 90s — has often been quoted as saying she won't take on another White Barn season. After Sunday's celebration she could be overheard inviting two well-known performers to 'put something together and come up to The Barn next summer.'"

The Dublin Players of Ireland performed at the theater for several seasons with Milo O'Shea.

On September 26, 1992, the White Barn Theater Museum was created by renovating a small area of the theater formerly used for storage.

== After Lortel's death ==
Lortel bequeathed the property to her foundation, which later proposed building a housing development and a school. This proposal was opposed by the Save Cranbury Association.

In 2005, the State of Connecticut granted $450,000 to the Norwalk Land Conservation Trust to help preserve the property, which contains a pond, fields, wetlands, and woodland. Stony Brook, a Class A stream, runs through the property into a nearby aquifer.

In 2006, the property was sold for $4.8 million to 78 Cranberry Road LLC, according to Westport Now magazine.

In 2008, the property was purchased by the Connecticut Friends School in nearby Wilton. The school planned to expand their campus onto the property. The Connecticut Friends School was not able to raise the money for their expansion.

Jim Fieber of Special Properties II submitted a plan in 2015, to build a 21-home conservation development on the property. Fieber subsequently amended the plan to a 15-home conservation development.

As of 2015, the Norwalk Zoning Commission was still considering the proposal, including demolition of the theater. Local historians were attempting to save visual art they believe to have been done in the theater by Geoffrey Holder.

The White Barn Theatre was demolished July 17, 2017, after the most recent two-year effort to save it from development.
