= Cranbury (Norwalk) =

Coordinates: 41°08′50″N 73°23′42″W

- Neighborhood
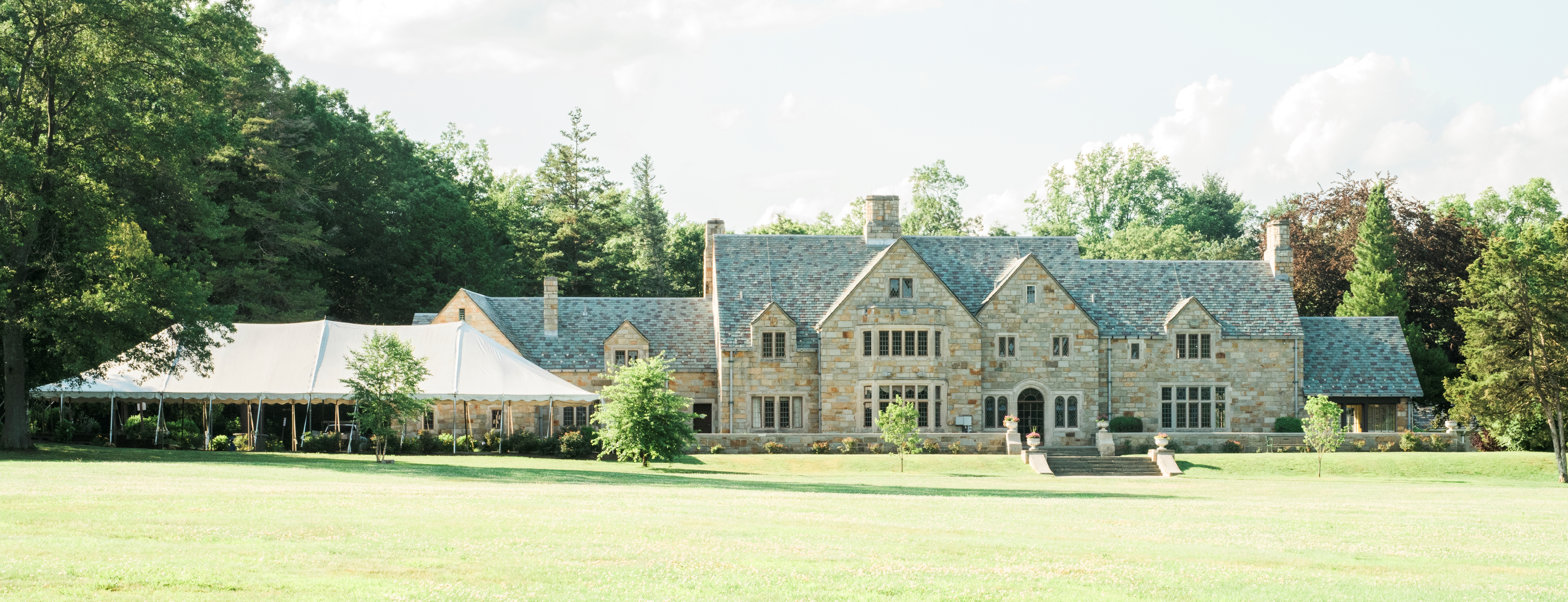
- Cranbury Park and Gallaher Mansion
- Interactive map of Cranbury
- Country: United States
- State: Connecticut
- County: Fairfield
- City: Norwalk
- Time zone: UTC-5:00 (Eastern)
  - Summer (DST): UTC-4:00 (Eastern)
- Area code: 203

Cranbury is a neighborhood or section in the northeast corner of the city of Norwalk in Fairfield County, Connecticut, United States.

== Arts and culture ==
The White Barn Theatre was founded in 1947 on a 18.5-acre (7.5 ha) estate in Cranbury.

== Parks and recreation ==
Cranbury Park is a 220-acre (89 ha) park located in the neighborhood.

Woods Pond is 9.6 acres located here.
