= Morris Ketchum Jesup =

American banker and philanthropist

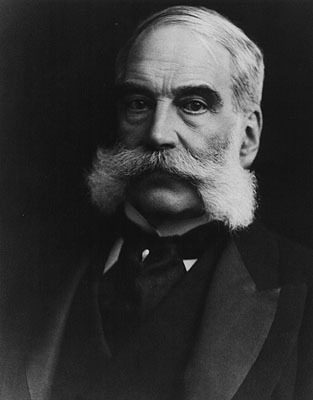
- Born: June 21, 1830; Westport, Connecticut
- Died: January 22, 1908 (aged 77); New York City, New York
- Resting place: Green-Wood Cemetery
- Spouse: Maria van Antwerp DeWitt (after 1854)
- Parent(s): Charles Jesup; Abigail Sherwood

Morris Ketchum Jesup (June 21, 1830 – January 22, 1908) was an American banker and philanthropist. He was the president of the American Museum of Natural History and was known as a leading patron of scientific research and an eminent art collector, particularly towards his support for Frederic Edwin Church.

== Early life ==
Morris Jesup was born at Westport, Connecticut in 1830, the son of Charles Jesup and Abigail Sherwood. He was descended from Edward Jessup of the Stamford, New Haven Colony, an early settler in Middleburg, Long Island, now Elmhurst, Queens. Edward later became owner of a large estate in what is now Hunts Point, Bronx.

== Career ==
In 1842 he went to New York City, where after some experience in business, he established a banking house in 1852. In 1856 he organized the banking firm of MK Jesup & Company, which after two reorganizations became Cuyler, Morgan & Jesup. He became widely known as a financier, retiring from active business in 1884.

=== Philanthropy ===
Before his retirement, he was already active in a wide variety of philanthropic endeavors. Jesup was one of the organizers of the United States Christian Commission during the Civil War, which helped provide care for wounded soldiers. He was one of the founders of YMCA New York, and served as its president in New York in 1872.

After 1860 he helped found and served as president of the Five Points House of Industry in New York, a type of settlement house in Lower Manhattan to teach new European immigrants the skills needed in the United States. In 1881, he became president of the New York City Mission and Tract Society. He donated the funds for construction of the Society's DeWitt (his father-in-law) Memorial Church in Rivington Street on the Lower East Side, a center of immigrant settlement. Jesup contributed funds and worked personally to better social conditions in New York, in a period when the city was struggling to aid many poor immigrants from rural areas of southern and eastern Europe, including the Russian Empire. The Woman's Hospital in New York City received $100,000.

He was best known as a patron of scientific research: Jesup was a major contributor to fund the Arctic expeditions of Robert Peary. He was elected president of the Peary Arctic Club in 1899. Jesup also funded the Jesup North Pacific Expedition (1897-1902), a major ethnographic project led by the anthropologist Franz Boas.

He was also an important patron and collector of the visual arts, perhaps best remembered for his support of Frederic Edwin Church, which resulted in the 1871 masterwork The Parthenon that came into the collection of the Metropolitan Museum of Art with Jesup's substantial bequest of many important paintings of the Hudson River School and more at the time of his wife's death in 1915.

Jesup contributed to educational institutions. His contributions to Tuskegee Institute enabled George Washington Carver to develop a mobile educational station that he took to farmers. Jesup was treasurer of the John F. Slater Fund for the Education of Freedmen at its beginning. He served as a member of the Peabody Educational Board and of the General Education Board. He gave $51,000 to the Yale Divinity School; to Yale University, he gave the Landberg Arabic manuscripts, for which he had paid $20,000. Williams College received $35,000. He presented Jesup Hall to the Union Theological Seminary.

In 1881, he was appointed president of the American Museum of Natural History, in New York City, to which he gave large sums in his lifetime and bequeathed $1,000,000. In 1883 he became chairman of the newly formed Forestry Committee of the New York Chamber of Commerce, tasked with "saving the woods and waters of the State [i.e.New York]," an early step in a process that eventually led to the creation of New York State's Adirondack Park in 1894. New York City business interests at the time were fearful that deforestation of the Adirondacks would ruin the Hudson River waterways upon which their business was dependent. The Forestry Committee pressured the state legislature to purchase lands in the Adirondack forest, and proposed a model bill. The legislature did not authorize the purchase of lands, but set aside about 700,000 acres of state holdings from future sale. In 1885, Governor Hill signed a new bill into law creating a "Forest Preserve" in the Adirondacks, however, cutting rights were soon being sold to private companies and individuals, and even to the lumberman on the newly created state Forest Commission. In response, in 1890, as president of the New York State Forestry Association, Jesup's group was one of many to propose new bills whose purpose was to create an Adirondack park. Downriver businessmen did not want any lumbering activities in the proposed park area. In 1892, Governor Flower signed the Adirondack Park Enabling Act, creating a state park, but left the issue of timber-cutting ambiguous. The state's constitutional convention in 1894, an amendment to fully protect the trees of the park was unanimously approved by a vote of 122 to 0. It went into full effect in 1895.

Jesup also served as trustee for the Syrian Protestant College (American University of Beirut) from 1884 to 1892, and board chair from 1893 to 1908. He also built "Post Hall", which is home to the university's Archaeological Museum and Geology Department.

Jesup was president of the New York Chamber of Commerce from 1899 until 1907, and was the largest subscriber to its new building. Jesup was a member of the Jekyll Island Club (aka The millionaires Club) on Jekyll Island, Georgia along with J.P. Morgan and William Rockefeller among others.

To his native town he donated funds to construct the Westport Public Library.

== Personal life ==
In 1854, Morris married Maria van Antwerp DeWitt (1834–1914). Maria was a daughter of Rev. Thomas DeWitt Jr., who was the pastor of the Collegiate Dutch Church in New York City for forty years. Her sister, Mary Elizabeth DeWitt, was the wife of Theodore Cuyler, general counsel for the Pennsylvania Railroad, and mother to Thomas DeWitt Cuyler among others.

Jesup died on January 22, 1908, aged 77, at 107 Madison Avenue, his home in New York City and was buried in Green-Wood Cemetery in Brooklyn.

== Legacy and honors ==
- 1905, he was knighted by Tsar Nicholas II of Russia for his philanthropic work aiding immigrants from the Russian Empire.
- Columbia University's Jesup Lectureship is named after him.
- The Morris K. Jesup Psychological Laboratory on Vanderbilt University's Peabody campus was named for him and was the first building of its kind in the world;
- Cape Morris Jesup, the northernmost point of mainland Greenland, as well as Morris Jesup Glacier, were named in his honor.
- The American Museum of Natural History's hall of Northwest Coast Indians is named after him.
- The town of Jesup, Iowa is named for him.
- Jesup Memorial Library in Bar Harbor, Maine is named after Jesup, who was a longtime resident of the area. Shortly after his death, Jesup's wife funded the library's initial endowment in his memory.
- Jesup Trail at Acadia National Park is named after Jesup and his wife.

== See also ==
- Westport Public Library
