= Ohio State Murders =

1991 play by Adrienne Kennedy

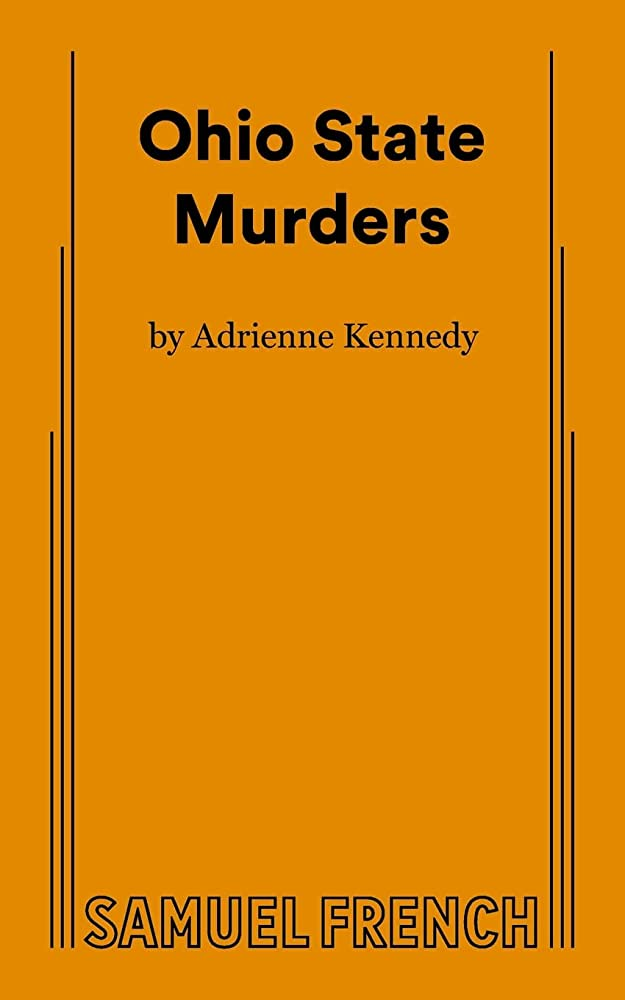
Book cover for Ohio State Murders

Ohio State Murders is a play written by Adrienne Kennedy. The play was first published on January 14, 1991.

== Plot ==
Ohio State Murders is a one-act play that revolves around racism, misogyny, and young adulthood. The play focuses on the life of Suzanne Alexander, a college student at Ohio State University from 1949 to 1950. As she goes back to her alma mater as a renowned Black author to speak, Suzanne addresses the reasons why she uses "violent" images in her works. This query gives Suzanne the platform to fully speak about her trauma experienced as a black woman at Ohio State University and the murder of her daughters Cathi and Carol by her professor, and the father of her children, Robert Hampshire.

Suzanne is faced with systemic racism through the education system and peers, sexism by her professor and police, and internalized racism from her family members. Kennedy provides a powerfully crafted portrayal of Suzanne Alexander's isolation and the glass ceiling at Ohio State in the 1950s.

== Characters ==
- Suzanne Alexander — Writer and Ohio State University alumna
- Robert Hampshire — English professor at Ohio State University
- Iris Ann — Suzanne's roommate at Ohio State
- David Alexander — Suzanne's husband and former law student at Ohio State
- Val — Suzanne's acquaintance
- Aunt Lou — Suzanne's aunt who cares for her after the birth of her children
- Mrs. Tyler — A widow who provided lodging to Suzanne in Columbus
- Cathi & Carol — Suzanne's baby twin daughters
- Patricia "Bunny" Manley — Suzanne's racist dorm neighbor at Ohio State

== Productions ==
The play was first performed from January 14 to February 9, 1991, at Yale Repertory Theatre's Winterfest, starring Olivia Cole and premiered at the Great Lakes Theater Festival on March 7, 1992, in a production directed by Gerald Freedman and Mary Bill. Its New York debut was off-Broadway at the Duke on 42nd Street, Theatre for a New Audience on October 27, 2007, directed by Evan Yionoulis and starring LisaGay Hamilton.

Ohio State Murders received renewed interest beginning in 2020, with a series of digitally distributed productions leading up to its Broadway debut. As part of an Adrienne Kennedy festival in 2020 produced by Round House Theatre and McCarter Theatre, Ohio State Murders was one of four Kennedy pieces performed and distributed online. In June 2021, the play received two more digital productions. The first was a reading to benefit The Actors Fund, featuring Audra McDonald and Lizan Mitchell; the cast also included Ben Rappaport and Warner Miller, but left vacant the role of Iris Ann. Later in June, a fully staged production was announced to be the second of a three-part live series that would be held at the Goodman Theatre in Chicago, Illinois.

The play officially opened on Broadway in December 2022 as the first production in the restored James Earl Jones Theatre. The production, directed by Kenny Leon who had directed the 2021 reading, again featured McDonald and Mitchell reprising their roles from the reading, and being joined by Mister Fitzgerald, Abigail Stephenson, and Bryce Pinkham in the cast. This production marked Kennedy's debut as playwright on Broadway, at the age of 91, over 30 years after the play was first produced and nearly 60 years after her first play had been produced. On January 5, 2023, it was announced that the show would close on January 15 after being initially scheduled to close on February 12. Audra McDonald received a Tony Award nomination for Best Performance by an Actress in a Leading Role in a Play for her role.

== Background ==
Ohio State Murders is part of a series of plays by Adrienne Kennedy called "Alexander Plays". These plays are connected due to the recurring character, Suzanne Alexander. The plays are noted for their themes of infanticide and troublesome pregnancies.

Kennedy was raised in Cleveland, Ohio. She and her family were of the middle-class and both her parents were involved in fields that helped children academically. She started to write when she was a child but didn't begin writing plays until adulthood. By the time she started writing plays, she had already married her husband and was taking care of her first child. After marrying her husband Joseph, she left Cleveland and relocated to New York. Kennedy worked on many plays post move and as a woman contributed greatly to the Black Theatre Movement of the 1960s as the field was mostly male dominated.

While her childhood was filled with much diversity, Adrienne Kennedy, like Suzanne Alexander, was introduced to systemic racism when she went to Ohio State University. There, she observed and took notice of the institution's discrimination against black people. By the time Kennedy was 34, her first play received a production, Funnyhouse of a Negro. She was also a creative writing teacher at UC Davis and had other side interests, including writing musicals and writing for films.

The story of Ohio State Murders takes place at Ohio State University during the 1950s. During the Civil Rights Movement, and a decade before the Black Arts Movement, that was a time when there were only 300 black students, and even fewer women writers. The total population of the campus rounded towards 27,000 people. At the time, black people were restricted from other things within the university that prevented them from growing in terms of gaining educational fulfillment, including not being allowed to major in certain subjects or be part of certain social clubs. Kennedy attended Ohio State University in the late 1940s and used her real experience as well the experiences of other black people to tell her story. She drew inspiration from the stories told to her by her mother and by the news of what was happening to black people around her neighborhood.

== Critical reception ==
After 44 shows, Ohio State Murders' Broadway production closed earlier than scheduled on January 15, 2023, having been scheduled to run until February 12, 2023. The production only managed to fill 49% of its seats during its running time. According to a filing with the Securities and Exchange Commission, the play was provided a capital of $5.1 million for production. At the time of Paulson's review on January 5, 2023, the production's highest weekly grossing amount had only reached $311,893. Paulson cited inflation and the coronavirus pandemic as factors of the show's lack of traction.

New York Times critic Michael Paulson recognized Ohio State Murders as a "powerful" and "gripping story" but "tough to sell". In a review for The Guardian, critic Gloria Oladipo gave the Ohio State Murders Broadway production a three-star rating. Oladipo applauded director Kenny Leon and lighting designer Allen Lee Hughes for their creative work on the production, and she recognized Ohio State Murders as a social critique of prevailing systematic racism in universities. However, Oladipo felt the play lacked a "higher calling", criticizing a lack of "insight into [Sue's] inner monologue" and calling for more emotional depth from the protagonist.

Literary critic Adam Bradley recognized Ohio State Murders as an undervalued work of the 20th century by a Black American author. Bradley referred to the Broadway debut of the play as "belated".

The Wall Street Journal's theatre critic Charles Isherwood applauded Ohio State Murders' "unsettling power" as a "great work of art" through its execution of a tense tone, praising Audra McDonald's performance as Suzanne Alexander. However, Isherwood criticized Beowulf Boritt's set design as "overscaled and overblown", a distraction from Kenny Leon's creative direction.

== Awards and nominations ==
=== 1991 Connecticut production ===
Year	Award	Category	Nominee	Result	Ref.
1991	American Theatre Critics Association Award	Harold and Mimi Steinberg/ATCA New Play Award	Adrienne Kennedy	Nominated	

=== 2022 Broadway production ===
Year	Award	Category	Nominee	Result	Ref.
2023	Drama League Awards	Outstanding Revival of a Play		Nominated	
2023	Tony Awards	Best Leading Actress in a Play	Audra McDonald	Nominated	
