= Will You Marry Me? (opera) =

1989 opera by Hugo Weisgall and Charles Kondek

Will You Marry Me? is an opera in one act by composer Hugo Weisgall. The English language libretto by Charles Kondek is based on the play A Marriage Has Been Arranged by Alfred Sutro. The opera's premiere was given by the Opera Ensemble of New York (OENY) on March 8, 1989 in New York City in conjunction with performances of two other works by Weisgall: The Stronger and The Golden Peacock. The OENY commissioned the two character opera and the premiere cast included soprano Andrea Broido as "She" and baritone David Trombley as "He".
