= Aishah Rahman =

American dramatist

Aishah Rahman (November 4, 1936 – December 29, 2014) was an American playwright, author, professor and essayist. She was known for her participation and contribution to the Black Arts Movement, as well as her plays documenting various aspects of black life.

== Early years and education ==
Aishah Hughes was born November 4, 1936, in New York City. Rahman grew up as a foster child in Harlem. Church was a big part of her life, and she spent her free time as a child hopping between churches. She wrote her first play in sixth grade about germs for National Health week. She attended George Washington High School, and graduated in 1954. She was inspired by fellow Harlem writers Langston Hughes and James Baldwin and left Harlem in the late 1950s to join the emerging Jazz and Beat scene where she was one of the few Black women. Rahman has attributed her interest in theater to her difficult life growing up in foster care, as she often was "a conduct problem," but found solace in the realm of theater, where her extroversion was celebrated. She attended Howard University and Goddard College, and in 1992 she became a professor of Literary Arts at Brown University. At Brown, Rahman worked to edit and create an anthology of plays from the university entitled NuMuse.

== Career ==
Rahman was an avid participator in the Harlem Black Arts Movement. She participated in numerous demonstrations, including in 1961 to protest the murder of Patrice Lumumba. Having grown up in Harlem, Rahman felt strongly connected to the people and the movement for a "black aesthetic," as she calls it. She has published numerous essays about the movement.

The Black Arts Movement helped to propel Rahman forward as a playwright. She credits Adrienne Kennedy, Amiri Baraka, Sam Shepard, Federico García Lorca and Bertolt Brecht as her literary influences. Further yet, Rahman's work was strongly influenced by jazz music, and jazz's rhythm and meter is integral to the structure and flow she establishes in her plays.

Rahman was the author of numerous plays. Her styles range from dramas, such as Unfinished Women Cry In No Man's Land While a Bird Dies in Gilded Cage and The Mojo and the Sayso, to musicals, such as Lady Day A Musical Tragedy, or The Tale of Madame Zora. Her plays were produced at The Public Theater, The Ensemble Theatre and theaters and universities across the United States. Among her numerous fellowships, grants and awards are a special award from the Rockefeller Foundation of the Arts for dedication to playwriting in the American Theater, The Doris Abramson Playwriting Award for The Mojo and the Sayso, and a New York Foundation for the Arts Fellowship.

Apart from writing plays, as a literary professor at Brown University, she also wrote a well received fictional memoir Chewed Water which was published in 2001. She released her memoir, titled Chewed Water, in 2001 about her childhood in the Harlem foster care system.

Rahman had two kids, Yoruba Richen and Kevin Brown. She has two grandchildren and five great-grandchildren. She died December 29, 2014, in San Miguel de Allende, Mexico.

== Publications and plays ==
- Lady Day: A Musical Tragedy (1972): Rahman's first play was produced in 1972. It is set in the historic Apollo Theater in New York City, and is about the life and career of Billie Holiday.
- Unfinished Women Cry In No Man's Land While A Bird Dies In A Gilded Cage (1977): Rahman's second play was first produced by the New York Shakespeare festival in 1977. The play takes place on the day of Charlie Parker, a jazz saxophonist's death in 1955. It follows five pregnant teenage girls who are deciding whether or not to keep their babies. The play uses the event of Parker's death to tie the girls' stories together. Since its first production, it has since rarely been produced by major theater companies and now runs in circuits at the university level.
- The Tale of Madame Zora (1986): Rahman's first musical was based on the life of Zora Neale Hurston. Its musical composition features heavy influence of blues.
- The Mojo and the Sayso (1987): Rahman's next play follows the story of the Benjamin family, and discusses the issue of police brutality.
- The Opera of Marie Laveau (1989): Rahman's first opera about a voodoo queen was created in collaboration with composer Akua Dizon Turre. Rahman later renamed the opera Anybody Seen Marie Laveau?
- Only In America (1993): In one of her most modern plays, Rahman features the Greek prophetess Cassandra as a modern victim of sexual harassment.
- Chiaroscuro (2010): This play, which is set on a cruise ship, highlights the issue of colorism in the black community.
- Chewed Water: Rahman's memoir, published in 2001, details her childhood growing up in Harlem in the foster care system.
