= A Movie Star Has To Star in Black and White =

1976 one-act play by Adrienne Kennedy

A Movie Star Has to Star in Black and White is a one-act play split into three scenes written by Adrienne Kennedy and first performed in 1976. Actors are made to look like famous film stars Marlon Brando, Paul Henreid, Montgomery Clift, Jean Peters, Bette Davis, and Shelley Winters. The supporting roles of this story are Clara, her mother, father, brother, and husband. The settings of the three scenes take place on the sets of movies, as well as a "real place": Now Voyager/ hospital lobby, Viva Zapata!/ Clara's brother's hospital room, and A Place in the Sun/ Clara's old room.

== Synopsis ==
The show begins with an image of the Columbia Pictures Lady drenched in a bright light. This first scene takes place in the Now, Voyager set as well as the hospital lobby. It is summer in New York, 1955. The Columbia Pictures Lady sets the scene and talks about suicidal thoughts, loneliness, and marital troubles (all recurring throughout). The scene fades to Clara, an African-American woman in a maternity dress. She longs to be a successful writer as well as find someone she can "...co-exist in a true union" with. The Scene switches to Bette Davis and Paul Henreid on the deck of a liner from Now, Voyager. Bette takes on the thoughts of Clara and expresses her concerns about dying from blood loss in childbirth, as her mother had. She was supposed to be an angel to the family, but she did not bring her family peace. Clara's Mother comes into the picture and explains the difference of living between the blacks and whites in their town. Whites had sidewalks with paved roads, nice bathrooms and water fountains. Blacks had dirt roads, they weren't allowed to sit in restaurants and they had to sit on a separate train. Bette dreams of talking to Jesus; she writes about God often. Clara's father left the family to be with a girl who talks to willow trees. She talks about her forced relationship with her ex-husband, Eddie. The pregnant Clara enters and talks to Eddie about jealousy. She wants to do something with her life like he does. She reads her own story about dragging the dead body of her father through the grass, her is her "blood father". She talks about how her father had attempted suicide. She yearns to fly free like the Owl to be in the Kingdom of God. Dead.

In scene two, the lights come up on Clara's entrance into her brother's hospital room and Viva Zapata!. Wally, Clara's brother is in a coma. Jean Peters takes on the story of Clara. Clara's mother enters upset about how her children are unhappy. Clara expresses that she is very happy because she is going to have one of her plays produced. Clara's mother doesn't understand how Clara could be happy without a family of her own. She asks Clara to get back together with Eddie now that she is pregnant. Jean Peters has extreme depression about her divorce from Eddie. She has to borrow money from Eddie because she doesn't make enough money independently, which drives her crazy. Wally is most likely not going to survive. Clara recites a poem about calling to God, but The Owl Answers. Clara's Mother and Father fight about their divorce. Jean Peters recites more from her play, wishing that she could fly away like the Owl to God.

In the final scene, it is a flashback where Shelley Winters and Montgomery Clift are rowing in a small boat from the set of A Place in the Sun. Clara is in bed. She is bleeding and writing poems. Kennedy then notes that Clift continues to grow; she says that all three male movie stars are to be mute. Clara is sharing her aspirations of being an African American writer from a very young age. People told her it was unrealistic. Eddie calls her passion for writing an "obsession to write". Eddie says that she has become shy and secretive. Eddie feels like Clara is a spectator of her own life and that her diaries consume her. Eddie doesn't seem the same since he came back from the war in Korea. Jean Peters reads a segment of writing that talks about a bad fight between her mother and father. She again speaks of being an Owl in a fig tree and reaching the Kingdom of God. Jean Peters tells the story of Wally who dropped out of school to be in the army. He committed a crime and was let go from the army and is working in a hospital. He tried to go back to school but dropped out again. He married a girl right before he went to Germany. She graduated cum laude while he was a prisoner in stockade. It is back to current times and Clara cries about her brother being close to death. Her brother will live brain dead and paralyzed. The show closes with a "Brief dazzling image of the Columbia Pictures Lady."

== Characters and cast ==
Role	Actor/Actress
Wallace	Frank Adu
Marlon Brando	Ray Barry
Eddie	Robert Christian
Paul Henreid	Richard Dow
Hattie	Gloria Foster
Montgomery Clift	C.S. Hayward
Jean Peters/Columbia Pictures Lady	Karen Ludwig
Clara	Robbie McCauley
Bette Davis	Avra Petrides
Shelley Winters	Ellin Ruskin

Director: Joseph Chaikin

Lights: Beverly Emmons

Costumes: Kate Carmel

Music: Peter Golub

== Themes ==
=== Metadrama ===
The play portrays many meta themes. The locations of the scenes take place on a movie set, therefore it is perceived as a production within a theater production.

=== Feminism ===
We see Kennedy's feminist take on theater as she uses a non-masculine plot structure. Meaning it does not follow the basic linear plot structure. A masculine plot structure refers to a story with and intro, a conflict, a climax, a solution and a resolve.

=== Hollywood representation of women ===
The first, most obvious example of prejudice in Hollywood is the fact that Clara is African-American, while all of the Hollywood actors who portray scenes from her life are white. The story becomes a fantasy of her life as she watches privileged white people live through the struggles of her own life. The alienation of African Americans in society as well as Hollywood becomes evident as we travel through Clara's memories.

=== Double standards and expectations ===
Clara is expected to be an angelic women in society and the household. She is an educated writer and longs for much more. Social expectations say she should be a housewife that supports her husband's university goals.

"CLARA. (From boat:) Ever since I was twelve I have secretly dreamed of being a writer. Everyone says it's unrealistic for a Negro to want to write. Eddie says I've become shy and secretive and I can't accept the passage of time, and that my diaries consume me and that my diaries make me a spectator watching my life like watching a Black and white movie."

== Symbols ==
=== Locations ===
In scene 1, the set is "The hospital lobby and Now, Voyager", in Scene 2 it is her "Brother’s room and Viva Zapata!", whereas in Scene 3 it is "Clara’s old room and A Place in the Sun". These movie sets are relevant, because the plots of the movies parallel Clara's story. Conversely, some scenes from the movies create great juxtaposition to scenes and themes in the play. All locations are very purposeful and directly connect to themes, motifs, and messages of the play:

-Now, Voyager has a recurring motif that parallels a theme in Adrienne's works. She touches upon the motif "never was born". A major part of A Movie Star Has to Star in Black and White is the difference between life and death. Many characters deal with suicidal thoughts and actions, as well as the loss of loved ones and children.

-A Place in the Sun connects to the fear of drowning, a pregnant working class girl, as well as the idea of a caged bird, seen as the Owl in this play.

-Viva Zapata! integrates the themes of family struggles (death, divorce, fighting).

=== Pregnancy / Blood ===
Pregnancy is generally a symbol of femininity and fertility. In A Movie Star Has to Star in Black and White, pregnancy is a symbol connected to societal expectations, madness and death. All three films used in the play have the similar theme of reproduction. The "river of blood" echoes Clara's memory of her mother's miscarriage. It also symbolizes the birth of her play, while she chooses career over family.

=== Owls ===
There is a direct connection to Kennedy's 1965 play The Owl Answers. Her use of bird imagery alludes to the yearning for escape. Clara's father attempts to commit suicide in hopes of an escape to freedom. The motif of flying ("The Flying African") is often used in Afro-American stories and aspects of culture. Adrienne is inspired by the bible and birds are often seen in biblical stories.

== African-American women and Adrienne Kennedy's influence ==
Characters from Clara's real life are only seen as supporting roles, such as her father, mother, husband, and brother. All of these characters are African-American, which is not coincidental. White film actors are cast as Clara's family members to portray the American Ideal. When white people are faced with the problems of African Americans, it become even more obvious of the exclusion and racism in our country.

At the end of an interview with Elin Diamond, Kennedy said: "My plays make people uncomfortable so I’ve never had a play done in Cleveland [her hometown], never." Kennedy was an-out-of-the-box writer during the Black writers movement. She sought to write about black victims rather than black heroes. She writes about characters who try to pass as white. She seeks to write as she thinks. She never looked to glamorize her experience as an educated black woman, but rather to make others understand how society and her mind influenced her as a writer. Kennedy exploits black-white image and fantasy, which is usually ignored. Kennedy said that in New York City, "I bought black toreador pants and a black sweater and gathered my hair in a ponytail-like Audrey Hepburn and the girls in Vogue and I daydreamed. I started another play." She wanted to be like the girls she saw in pop culture, but there was always the barrier of her skin. This play attempts to explain how a black woman exists in a white society which is in a subordinate role. Kennedy was a fearless writer by using her own experience to expose the pain and suffering society has created for black women. Kennedy dared to change the structure of theater and paved the way for many writer after her. Kennedy's protagonist, Clara, is barely a protagonist at all because she is only a "bit part" that facilitates the white movie stars to tell her story.

== Performance history ==
A Movie Star Has to Star in Black and White was performed for the first time as a "work in progress" in the New York Shakespeare Festival on November 6, 1976. Some community theaters and colleges have picked up this one act. It is oftentimes performed in conjunction with Funny House of a Negro.
