= Hugo Weisgall =

American composer and conductor

Hugo Weisgall

Hugo David Weisgall (October 13, 1912 – March 11, 1997) was an American composer and conductor, known chiefly for his opera and vocal music compositions.

== Life and career ==
Hugo Weisgall was born in Ivančice, Moravia (then part of Austria-Hungary, later in his childhood Czechoslovakia) and moved to the United States with his parents in 1920 at the age of eight.

Weisgall studied at the Peabody Institute, privately with Roger Sessions, and at the Curtis Institute of Music with conductor Fritz Reiner and composer Rosario Scalero. He later earned a Ph.D. in German literature at Johns Hopkins University. During World War II he was an aide-de-camp to General George S. Patton. After the war he became a professor, and taught at Queens College, the Juilliard School, and the Jewish Theological Seminary, all in New York City. His notable students include composers Dominick Argento, Bruce Saylor and the accordionist/composer William Schimmel.

Weisgall came from a family of several generations of cantors, and maintained a lifelong interest in both sacred and secular Jewish music. In 1992 he was commissioned by the Friends of the Library of the Jewish Theological Seminary to write a song cycle, Psalm of the Distant Dove, commemorating the 500th anniversary of the expulsion of the Jews from Spain. Other major works include his most ambitious opera, Athaliah (libretto: Richard Frank Goldman, after Jean Racine), and his often-performed Six Characters in Search of an Author (libretto: Denis Johnston, after Luigi Pirandello).

Hugo Weisgall died at the age of 84 on Long Island, New York.

== Major works ==
Operas

- Night (1932, not performed). Opera in 1 act. Libretto: after the play by Sholem Asch
- Lilith (1934, not performed). Opera in 1 act. Libretto: after the play by L. Elman
- The Tenor (1948–1950). Opera in 1 act. Libretto: Karl Shapiro and Ernst Lert (after the play by Frank Wedekind). World Premiere: February 11, 1952 Baltimore (Peabody Opera Company; conductor: Hugo Weisgall)
- The Stronger (1952). Opera in 1 act. Libretto: Richard Henry Hart (after the play Den Starkare by August Strindberg). WP (piano version): August 9, 1952 Westport, Connecticut (White Barn Theatre; Hilltop Opera Company). WP (orchestral version): 1955 New York (Columbia University)
- Six Characters in Search of an Author (1953–1956). Opera in 3 acts. Libretto: Denis Johnston (after the play by Luigi Pirandello). WP: April 26, 1959 New York (New York City Opera; with Beverly Sills [Coloratura])
- Purgatory (1958). Opera in 1 act. Libretto: after the play by William Butler Yeats. WP: February 17, 1961 Washington (Library of Congress)
- The Gardens of Adonis (1959, revised 1977–1981). Opera in 3 scenes. Libretto: John Olon-Scrymgeour (after the play Venus and Adonis by André Obey, based on the eponymous poem by William Shakespeare). WP: September 12, 1992 Omaha, Nebraska (Witherspoon Concert Hall)
- Athaliah (1960–1963). Opera in 2 acts. Libretto: Richard Frank Goldman (after the play Athalie [1691] by Jean Racine). WP: February 17, 1964 New York (concert performance)
- Nine Rivers from Jordan (1964–1968). Opera in a prologue and 3 acts. Libretto: Denis Johnston. WP: October 9, 1968 New York (New York City Opera)
- Jenny, or The Hundred Nights (1975/76). Opera in 1 act. Libretto: John Hollander (after a [Noh] play by Yukio Mishima). WP: April 22, 1976 (Juilliard School, American Opera Center)
- Will You Marry Me? (1989). Opera in 1 act. Libretto: Charles Kondek (after the play A Marriage Has Been Arranged by Alfred Sutro). WP: March 8, 1989 New York (Opera Ensemble of New York)
- Esther (1990–1993). Opera in 3 acts. Libretto: Charles Kondek (after the Bible). WP: October 8, 1993 New York (New York City Opera)

Vocal music

- A Garden Eastward Cantata for soprano and orchestra
- A Song of Celebration for tenor, soprano, chorus and orchestra
- Evening Prayer for Peace (Ki el shomrenu) for chorus a cappella
- Fancies and Inventions for baritone and 5 instruments
- Fortress, Rock of Our Salvation (Moos tzur) for chorus a cappella
- Lyrical Interval song-cycle for low voice and piano
- Psalm of the Distant Dove Canticle for mezzo-soprano and piano
- So Spake Rabbi Akiba (Omar Rabbi Akiba) for chorus a cappella
- "Liebeslieder" for Soprano and Piano

== See also ==
- Joseph H. Bearns Prize
