= Black Children's Day =

1980 play by Adrienne Kennedy

- Original language: English
- Written by: Adrienne Kennedy
- Characters: The Children; Roy; Constance; The General; Asst. Curator
- Subject: Racism violence distorted reality weaving of mythical/historical
- Genre: Surrealism; Metatheatre
- Setting: Annex of Walker-Smith House

Black Children's Day is a one-act play written in 1980 by Adrienne Kennedy. It was commissioned by Brown University, and was revised in 1988. Kennedy is an African American playwright. Her plays often use surrealism as an element to explore the American experience from a non-white perspective, drawing on symbolism, mythical and historical figures, and themes of race, violence, and family to create her works. Specifically, Black Children's Day draws on elements of Metatheatre and surrealism to explore non-realistic characters in a chaotic sense. Many of Kennedy's plays are "autobiographically inspired".

== Summary ==
Black Children's Day is a short, one-act children's play that follows no real linear structure. The play depicts a chaotic hour before the Children's Day play, and features about ten Children playing various roles, and one adult. The play draws heavily from Kennedy's surrealist writing, and her allegorical, poetic passages create a loose structure for the play. Three major themes are repeated throughout the play, the World War II radio passage, the wedding of Constance and Roy, and the passage of the Ship Vine to Liberia. The New York Times critic Clive Barnes refers to Kennedy's highly symbolic work as such: "Miss Kennedy is weaving some kind of dramatic fabric of poetry."

== Characters ==
- Negro Children of the Anderson Elementary School... a local school (appears as Slaves, Indians, Passengers)
- Roy (one of The Children)(Also appears as Editor)
- Constance (one of The Children)
- The General (one of The Children)
- Asst. Curator of the Walker-Smith House
- Constance's Mother
- Caroline (one of The Children)
- Radio

Kennedy includes a note about the children, "The Children are not realistic... but are like the memory of childhood... endearing, innocent, and very serious."

=== Notes on characters ===
- Girls wear summer dresses
- Boys are in navy blue suits
- The General wears a uniform
- Roy is the class leader, Constance wanted to have a wedding in the carriage room
- Asst. Curator is a white woman in her 50s, she wears a grey suit blouse and pumps

== Setting ==
The play takes place on a Sunday in June, during World War II, in an unspecified New England town. The Children are putting up a play in Walker-Smith House, a historic mansion turned museum. In the Walker-Smith House is an annex in which civic events are held. Beyond the annex is a carriage house. These two rooms comprise the stage for "Black Children's Day". In the annex is a screen showing a sort film titled, "History of Walker Smith House", and several folding chairs, a small stage, and a World War II aircraft exhibit are present. The small stage in the annex, the area of folding chairs, and the carriage room are the main set pieces for the play. There is also a room downstage from which the Asst. Curator brings more folding chairs. A radio plays the whole time. It is a chaotic hour before the Children's Day play.

== Staging ==
Kennedy includes two pages of instructions for the set pieces. The notes for the various set pieces are somewhat cryptic, and are listed below:

=== The set ===
- Mural - is violent abstract lines Bright Crayons
- Aircraft Photographic Exhibit - dark
- Film - logical
- Radio - subliminal - incomplete
- Panels for the Set - very detailed realistic, oil paintings, accurate historical detail
- Play practice - out of sequence, illogical

=== Panels ===
The panels are realistic representations of what is happening on stage. The Children will draw on these panels throughout the play; there are five specific scenes on these panels. They are listed below:

- Negroes on "Lection Day"
- Free African Society Meeting in the Store Room
- The Ship Vine at the Port before Sailing to Liberia
- Nearby Indian Battle
- Lost Slaves Landing on New England Coast

These panels are realistic, and historically accurate in oil paints.

== Plot summary ==
Black Children's Day does not follow a linear structure, though it depicts a chaotic hour before the Children's Day Play. A note from the author at the start of the play indicates that "The most important thing about the play is that things happen simultaneously." Throughout the entire play, The Children paint whatever is happening on stage onto the murals. The more chaotic the scene is, the more ferociously The Children paint. The Asst. Curator is also showing fragmented films throughout the play. The short one-act opens with The Children reciting a fragmented poem about the state of World War II. This poetic passage is repeated throughout the play, and mentions Adolf Hitler, The Third Reich, Benito Mussolini, and Joseph Stalin. A very general plot begins, when we are introduced to The General, who fights with the landlord's men about his right to vote on "Lection Day", in 1840. The scene abruptly transitions to Caroline, who sings an 1840s song while The Children dance a 'Lection Day' dance. The Children then recite very fragmented passages about the Walker-Smith House, where they are putting up their play, and then repeat the poetic passage about the state of World War II. We are then introduced to another repeated theme, the wedding of Constance and Roy, played by The Children. They have plans to get married, and throughout the play, they prepare for the big day. Constance recites a hundred-year-old poem while The Children repeat the World War II poem yet again. The play transitions yet again to Roy as an Editor, who states that he formed the Free African Society, and will lead a group of Negroes to Liberia. A third plot point is then introduced; Ship Vine and its passage to Liberia. Constance and Roy are then married. They trade Jack Armstrong, the All-American Boy rings, and The Children throw flowers on them. The play then transitions again, and The Children as Passengers are waiting to board the Ship Vine to Liberia. The passengers recite a creed, and Constance and Roy board the ship. They ask if The General would like to join them, though he politely declines, and the ship sails away. As the ship disappears, The General is grabbed and beaten to death with stones. Some Children reenact an Indian battle, while others continue to draw the sailing ship and The General's death on the murals. The Asst. Curator, who has been showing fragmented film clips the entire play, has now disappeared. Constance tells Roy it is their wedding day, and suddenly, the Carriage Room explodes. Cries and yelling are heard, and it is revealed that the whites have bombed the church. The play ends with The Children solemnly saying, "They're dead. Connie and Roy are dead."

== Reception ==
Black Children's Day, commissioned by Brown University in 1980, was not widely received. The play was never published, or produced. However, in 1995, a Village Voice critic, Michael Feingold, wrote, "with Beckett gone, Adrienne Kennedy is probably the boldest artist now writing for the theater."

== Themes ==
Racism, violence (specifically towards children), surrealism to depict reality, rights for African Americans, slavery. Many themes can be drawn from Black Children's Day, as Kennedy's allegorical representation of the memory of childhood deals with multiple issues at once. The chaotic nature of the play represents the chaotic nature of childhood and oppression. Highly symbolic, the panels represent realistic historical representations of what The Children are reenacting on stage, and the repeated passage about the state of World War II can be connected to the historical events that are depicted. The Asst. Curator could seem to represent a sense of stability; she is the only adult in the play, and the explosion only occurs after she disappears.

== Adrienne Kennedy ==
Adrienne Kennedy was born Adrienne Lita Hawkins in Pittsburgh, PA on September 13, 1931. Kennedy spent most of her young life in Cleveland, though she wasn't exposed to racial prejudice until her college years at Ohio State University. One of the first plays Kennedy saw was The Glass Menagerie, which inspired her to pursue playwriting. She graduated from Ohio State in 1953 with a BA in Education and studied at Columbia University in 1954-56. Kennedy has written around 20 plays, most of which draw on her personal experiences.

== See also ==
- Adrienne Kennedy
- Surrealism
- Metatheatre
