= David Allen (playwright) =

British playwright

David Allen (born 4 January 1936, Birmingham, England) is a British playwright. He is notable for his play Cheapside, which has been shown at the Warehouse Theatre (in Croydon, South London) and the White Barn Theatre. His play Pommies was given its first performance at the Warehouse Theatre, Croydon in April 1988. His play In the Doghouse was produced at The Warehouse Theatre in Croydon, South London, opening in December 1990. Other plays include Gone with Hardy.

Allen was educated at Liverpool University and gained an honours degree in English Language and Literature.

== Works ==
- Allen, David (1985). Cheapside. Current Theatre. Currency Press. ISBN 978-0-86819-122-5.
