= Next (play) =

One-act play by Terrence McNally

- Written by: Terrence McNally
- Original language: English

Premiere
- Date premiered: July 16, 1967
- Place premiered: White Barn Theatre, Westport, Connecticut

Next is a one-act play by Terrence McNally. The play opened Off-Broadway in 1969.

== Plot ==
At the comedy's center are Marion Cheever, a middle-aged, overweight, debt-ridden, divorced father of two who mistakenly has been called by the draft, and Sergeant Thech, a no-nonsense female examining officer. A battle-of-wits is waged between the "sad sack" determined to avoid military service and the career officer just as determined to sign him up.

Starting out as an amusing incident, Cheever ends up showing "hatred and contempt" for his country.

== Production history ==
The original version of Next premiered at the White Barn Theatre, Westport, Connecticut on July 16, 1967. The play was then produced on television Channel 13 in New York City in March 1968. The role of Marion Cheever was played by James Coco.

Paired with Elaine May's Adaptation, Next opened Off-Broadway on February 10, 1969, at the Greenwich Mews Theatre, where it ran for 707 performances. James Coco and Elaine Shore were directed by May. May won the 1969 Outer Critics Circle Award, Best Director.

== Critical response ==
Clive Barnes, reviewing for the New York Times, wrote that the two plays "are just plain marvelous-funny, provocative and, in their way, touching". Of Coco's victim, "This is gorgeous acting, rich, stylish, impeccable."

Peter Wolfe (professor of English at the University of Missouri-St. Louis) wrote of the play : "...the line between victim and tormentor blurs...part of the play's merit stems from both the ambiguity of McNally's attitude towards his people and his ironical treatment of them."
