= Westport Library =

Public library in Westport, Connecticut, US

Coordinates: 41.1408°N 73.3616°W

The Westport Library
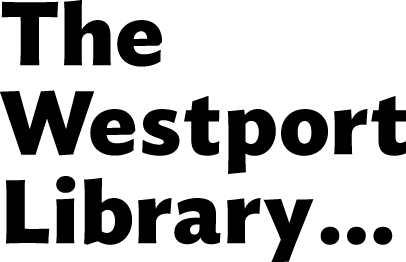
- Location: 20 Jesup Road, Westport, CT 06880, United States
- Established: 1908

Access and use
- Population served: 26,508

Other information
- Director: William H. Harmer
- Employees: 90
- Website: Official website

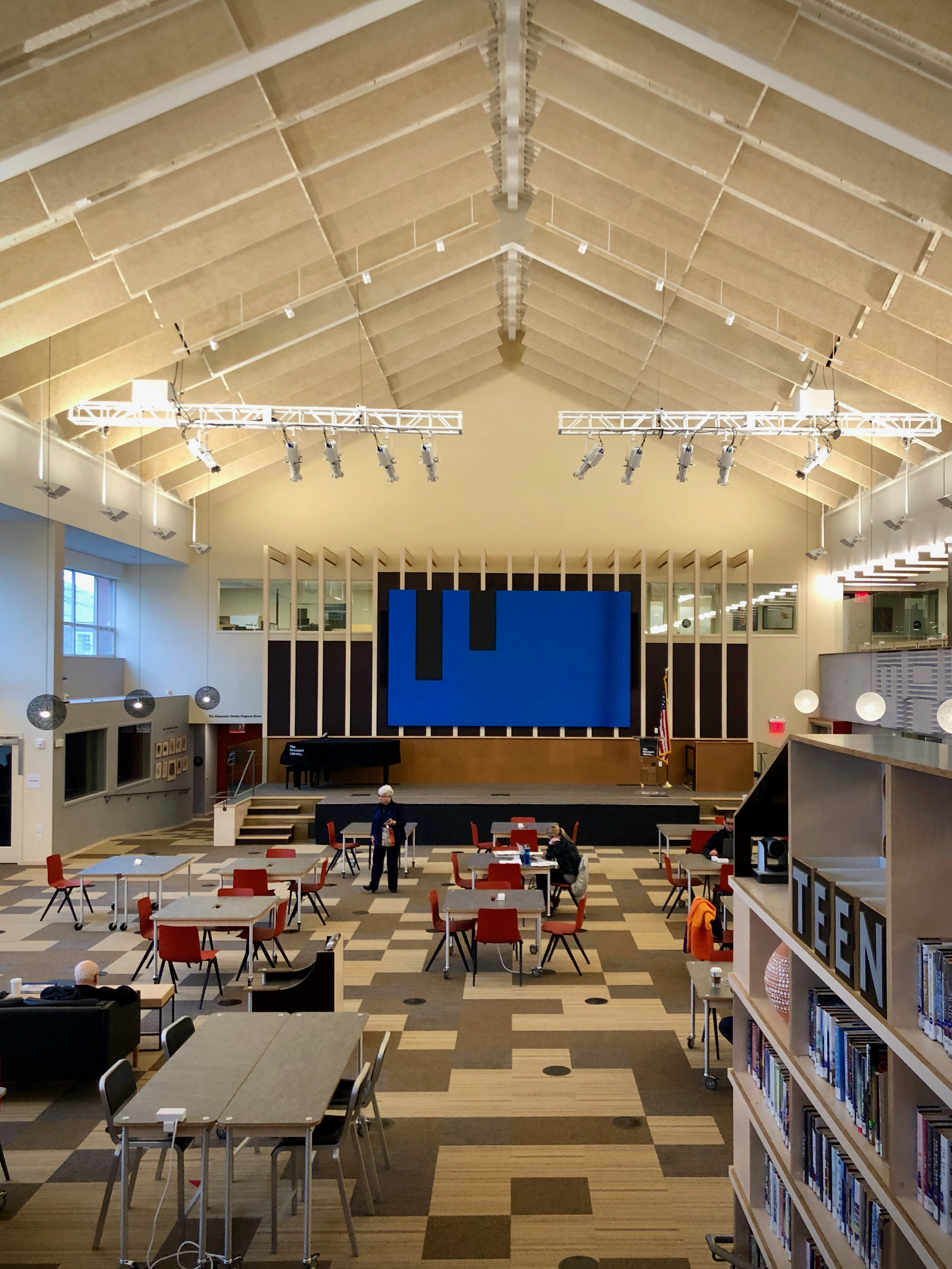
The central forum at the Westport Library following its renovation

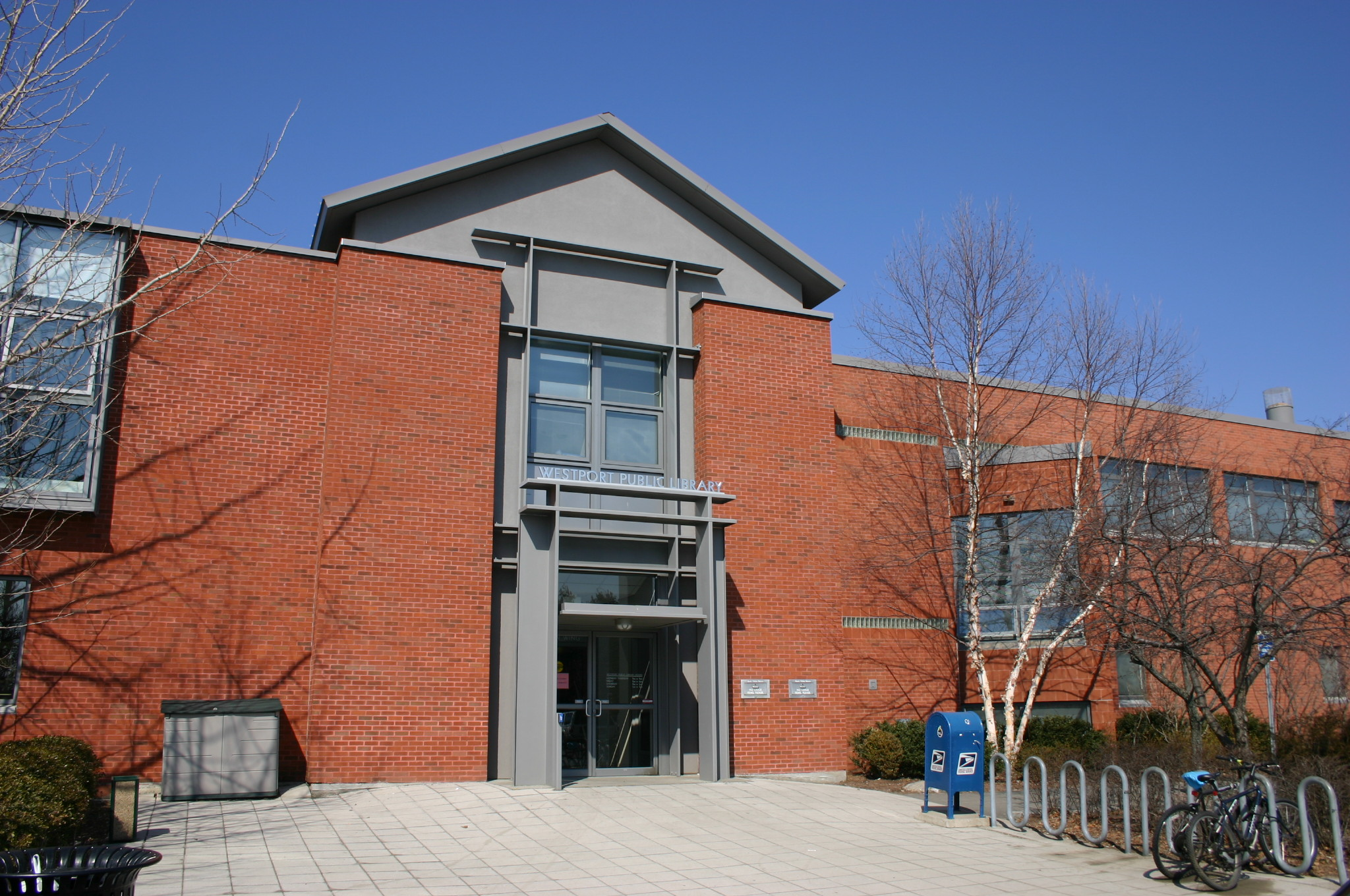
The front entrance of Westport library

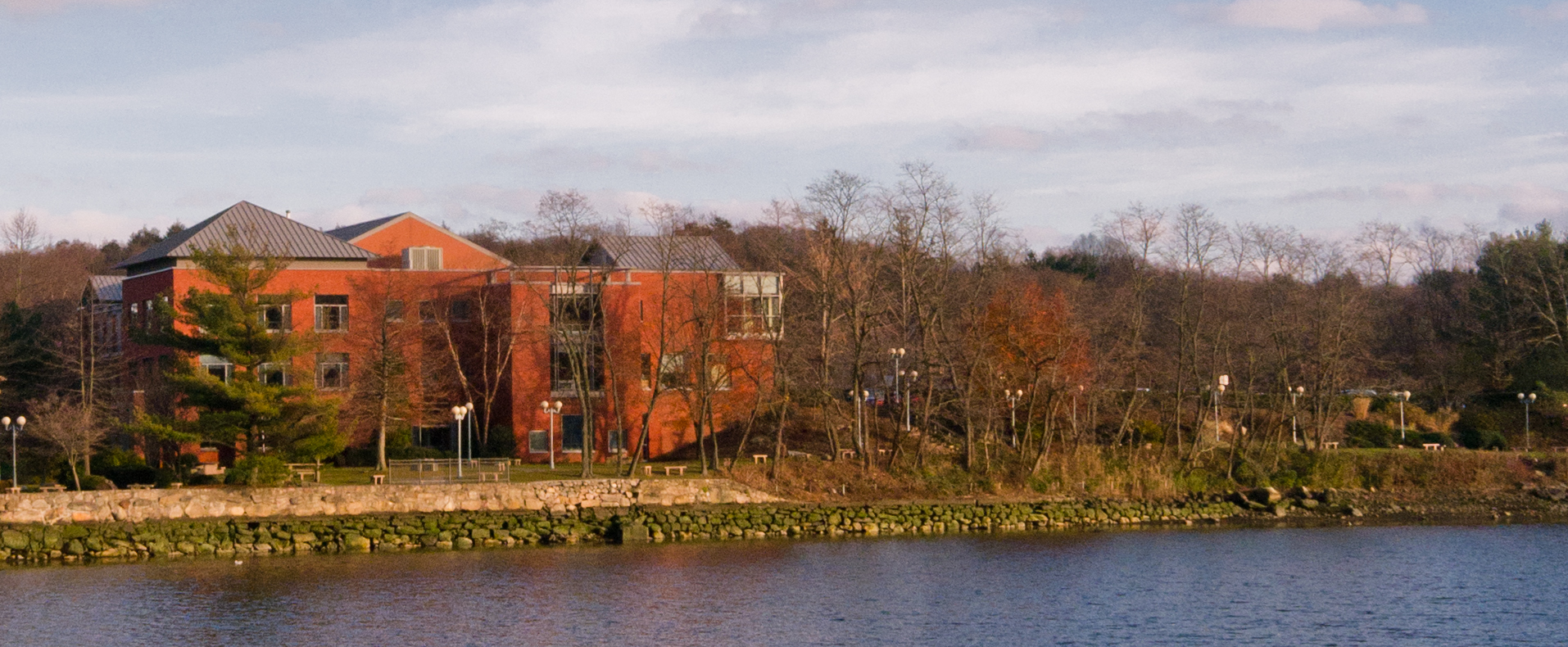
The Westport Library as seen from the opposite side of the Saugatuck River in Westport, Connecticut

The Westport Library is a public library in the town of Westport, Connecticut, established on February 4, 1886, by members of the Westport Reading-Room and Library Association.

Morris Ketchum Jesup, born in 1830 to a country doctor, amassed a fortune in the railroad business and became the benefactor of the library, donating the land and $5,000 for the building. In April 1908, the Westport Public Library was completed at a cost of $75,000 and dedicated to the custody of the Westport Library Association by Jesup's wife, following the wishes of her husband who died four months earlier.

In June 1984, plans were announced to build a new library on a site adjacent to Jesup Green on the Saugatuck River. Considerable discussion took place about how to raise the money for the new library and the proposed site, a former landfill. After a referendum was approved, the new library was built for $4.6 million and opened on Labor Day of 1986.

As popularity of the library increased, another renovation and expansion was completed in 1998. The improvements included a project called the "River of Names," a wall of small handmade tiles, paid for individually by donors, depicting local history.

By the year 2000, the library was the second busiest in the state in terms of circulation per capita, averaging 1,200 visitors a day.

Embracing a trend in expanding the role of libraries, the library opened a makerspace in 2012, a structure with 3D printers and other tools for people to create inventions and learn about new technology. The name of the library was changed to The Westport Library.

In 2013, the library received a $246,545 grant from the Institute of Museum and Library Services for the enhancement of the makerspace. In 2014, the library became the first library in the nation to use humanoid robots for the purpose of teaching computer programming.

In September 2017, ground was broken on a renovation project for the library, dubbed the "Transformation Project." The renovation lasted two years, and the library was reopened on June 23, 2019.

The library houses a recording studio, Verso Studios. The studio's Verso Records label released an album, Verso Records, Volume One, on June 3, 2023, which it claims is "the first vinyl record ever to be recorded, produced and released by a public library".

As a "forum for civic engagement and an incubator of new ideas," the Library provides many books and resources geared to fundraising, social entrepreneurship, and non-profit organizations. The Library is a Funding Information Network partner of the Foundation Center, the nation's leading authority on organized philanthropy. A Grants Center section provides additional guides and manuals for becoming effective fundraisers.
