= The Owl Answers =

1965 one-act play by Adrienne Kennedy

- Original language: English
- Written by: Adrienne Kennedy
- Characters: She; Bastard's Black Mother; Goddam Father; The White Bird; The Negro Man; Shakespeare; Chaucer; William the Conqueror
- Subject: Race-relations; Mortality; Memory; Identity
- Genre: Avant-garde
- Setting: New York Subway; Tower of London; Harlem hotel room St. Peter's

Premiere
- Date: 1965; 61 years ago
- Place: White Barn Theatre, Westport, CT

The Owl Answers is a one-act experimental play by Adrienne Kennedy. It premiered in 1965 at the White Barn Theatre in Westport, Connecticut one year after Kennedy's most well-known piece, the Obie Award-winning Funnyhouse of a Negro. Subsequent productions have been alongside another of Kennedy's one-acts, A Beast Story, as Cities in Bezique.

== Plot summary ==
An African-American girl dreams of establishing a heritage and imagines she is applying to bury her father in Westminster Cathedral. Historical figures scorn her, doubting the possibility of a black girl having that heritage. She argues that her father was white and her mother was his family's cook. As a child, she had to enter through the back door when she wanted to visit her father.

== Characters ==
- She who is Clara Passmore who is the Virgin Mary who is the Bastard who is the Owl
- Bastard's Black Mother who is the Reverend's Wife who is Anne Boleyn
- Goddam Father who is the Richest White Man in the Town who is Reverend Passmore
- The White Bird who is Reverend Passmore's Canary who is God's Dove
- The Negro Man
- Shakespeare
- Chaucer
- William the Conqueror

== Setting and themes ==
The setting of the play shifts between the New York City subway, the Tower of London, a Harlem hotel room, and Saint Peter's. Each setting utilizes the structure of a subway car and is filled with the sounds of the subway.

Themes include identity, mortality, memory, and race relations.

== Reception ==
Though written as a companion piece to Funnyhouse of a Negro The Owl Answers is most commonly produced with another of Kennedy's one-acts, A Beast's Story. This production of two one-acts was named Cities in Bezique when it appeared Off-Broadway.

Critic Michael Feingold of the Village Voice wrote: “With Beckett gone, Kennedy is probably the boldest artist now writing for the theatre.” Walter Kerr reviewed the Off-Broadway production for the New York Times, writing: "It is conceivable that this is a kind of theatre and that by simply immersing ourselves in it, without asking rational questions of it or trying to force it into some other shape, we might find ourselves clothed by the rain of images, fed by the accumulating overlay. I wouldn't rule the possibility out, any more than I'd wave away Miss Kennedy as a writer: There is a spare, unsentimental intensity about her that promises to drive a dagger home some day."

After a 2016 revival of the play, in which The Owl Answers was produced alongside Amiri Baraka's Dutchman at the Penumbra Theatre in Saint Paul, Minnesota, reviewer Laura Schmidt from Minnesota Monthly wrote: "The Owl Answers, directed by Talvin Wilks, is bold but unconventional, addressing gender, race, and identity. With the script’s opening direction of 'The scene is a New York subway car is the Tower of London is a Harlem hotel room in St. Peter’s,' it’s clear that playwright Adrienne Kennedy created an impossible world to stage. And this staging of The Owl Answers comes about as close to Kennedy’s wild imagination as possible. With a rotating stage, lifting panels, and fall-away walls, the subway car becomes supernatural. Masked figures with wings creepily saunter around the stage in elaborate costumes, their echoing voices filling the stage. But despite these elements and an emotional performance from Van as the character of She, the nonexistent narrative of Kennedy’s incredibly abstract text weighs down the production, making it almost incomprehensible by the end." Schmidt went on to write that, "In the 60s these shows were meant to boil blood, to provoke, to push back against violent racism. It feels like both these shows have accomplished the same task almost 50 years later, even if one succeeds in addressing this more strongly than the other."

== Productions ==
- 1965 (premiere) White Barn Theatre, directed by Michael Kahn
- 1969 (Off-Broadway premiere) staged with A Beast’s Story as Cities in Bezique
- 2013 - Columbia University, New York, New York
- 2016 - Penumbra Theatre Company, Saint Paul, Minnesota
- 2016 - Fordham University, New York, New York
- 2017 - Harvard College, Cambridge, Massachusetts
