= Adrienne Kennedy =

American playwright (born 1931)

- Born: Adrienne Lita Hawkins; September 13, 1931 (age 95); Pittsburgh, Pennsylvania, U.S.
- Education: Ohio State University (BA); Columbia University
- Occupations: Playwright, professor, poet
- Spouse: Joseph Kennedy (m. 1953; div. 1966)
- Children: 2
- Writing career
- Notable works: Funnyhouse of a Negro (1964); Ohio State Murders (1992)
- Notable awards: American Book Award; Anisfield-Wolf Book Award; Lila Wallace Reader's Digest Writers' Award; Obie Awards; Dramatists Guild of America Lifetime Achievement Award
- Movement: Black Arts Movement

Adrienne Kennedy (born September 13, 1931) is an American playwright. She is best known for Funnyhouse of a Negro, which premiered in 1964 and won an Obie Award. She won a lifetime Obie as well. In 2018 she was inducted into the Theater Hall of Fame.

In 2022, Kennedy received the Gold Medal for Drama from the American Academy of Arts and Letters; given every six years, it has been awarded to only 16 people, including Eugene O'Neill.

Kennedy has been contributing to American theater since the early 1960s, influencing generations of playwrights with her haunting, fragmentary lyrical dramas. Exploring the violence racism brings to people's lives, Kennedy's plays express poetic alienation, transcending the particulars of character and plot through ritualistic repetition and radical structural experimentation. Much of her work explores issues of race, kinship, and violence in American society, and many of her plays are "autobiographically inspired."

Kennedy is noted for the use of surrealism in her plays, which are often plotless and symbolic, drawing on mythical, historical, and imaginary figures to depict and explore the African-American experience.

In 1969, The New York Times critic Clive Barnes wrote: "While almost every black playwright in the country is fundamentally concerned with realism—LeRoi Jones and Ed Bullins at times have something different going but even their symbolism is straightforward stuff—Miss Kennedy is weaving some kind of dramatic fabric of poetry." In 1995, critic Michael Feingold of the Village Voice wrote that, "with Samuel Beckett gone, Adrienne Kennedy is probably the boldest artist now writing for the theater." Kennedy has also written in other genres, including poetry and essays.

== Life and career ==
Adrienne Kennedy was born Adrienne Lita Hawkins on September 13, 1931, in Pittsburgh, Pennsylvania. Her mother, Etta Hawkins, was a teacher, and her father, Cornell Wallace Hawkins, was a social worker. She spent most of her childhood in Cleveland, Ohio, attending Cleveland public schools. She grew up in an integrated neighborhood and did not experience much racism until attending college at Ohio State University. As a child, she spent most of her time reading books like Jane Eyre and The Secret Garden instead of playing games with other children.

She admired actors like Orson Welles and began to focus on theater during her teenage years. The Glass Menagerie was among the first plays she saw produced, inspiring her to explore her passion for playwriting. Her interest in playwriting continued when she started at Ohio State in 1949. She graduated from Ohio State in 1953 with a bachelor's degree in education and continued her studies at Columbia University in 1954–56. She married Joseph Kennedy on May 15, 1953, a month after graduating from Ohio State, and the couple had two children, Joseph Jr. and Adam P. Kennedy. They divorced in 1966.

Her first play to be produced was Funnyhouse of a Negro, a one-act play she wrote in 1960, the year she visited Ghana for a few months with her husband on his grant from the African Research Foundation. The play draws on Kennedy's African and European heritage as she explores a "black woman's psyche, riven by personal and inherited psychosis, at the root of which is the ambiguously double failure of both rapacious white society and its burdened yet also distorted victims."

A Rat's Mass was produced at La MaMa Experimental Theatre Club in Manhattan's East Village twice in 1969 and once in 1971. In 1976, La MaMa's Annex performed the show with music by Cecil Taylor. Sun: A Poem for Malcolm X Inspired By His Death and A Beast Story were both produced at La MaMa in 1974.

Kennedy was a founding member of the Women's Theatre Council in 1971, a member of the board of directors of PEN in 1976–77, and an International Theatre Institute representative in Budapest, Hungary, in 1978.

Kennedy has taught or lectured at Yale University (1972–74), Princeton University (1977), Brown University (1979–1980), University of California, Berkeley (1986), Harvard University (1991), Stanford University, New York University, and University of California, Davis.

Her memoir People Who Led to My Plays, first published in 1987, was reissued in 2016.

As of 2018, Kennedy has written thirteen published and five unpublished plays, several autobiographies, a novella, and a short story. Kennedy used the alias Adrienne Cornell for the short story "Because of the King of France", published in Black Orpheus: A Journal of African and Afro-American Literature in 1963. Much of Kennedy's work is based on her lived experience.

In 2022, Kennedy made her Broadway debut with the opening of her 1992 play Ohio State Murders at the James Earl Jones Theatre on December 8, starring Audra McDonald, and directed by Kenny Leon. with its last performance taking place on January 15, 2023. Speaking in an interview with Time Out magazine about what she hopes audiences will take away from seeing the play, Kennedy stated: "I want them to realize that they're listening to a very articulate, thoughtful American Black woman and, perhaps, they should pay attention to what she's saying." Despite its appraisal, its showtime was closed early due to its lack of commercial success and the effects of the COVID-19 pandemic, which had affected the revival of commercial theater in New York since then. The production received positive reviews and McDonald received a Tony Award nomination for Best Performance by an Actress in a Leading Role in a Play for her role.

== The Alexander Plays (1992) ==
Suzanne Alexander is a recurring character in several of Kennedy's plays. She Talks to Beethoven, Ohio State Murders, The Film Club, and The Dramatic Circle are collectively known as the Alexander Plays, and were published together under that title in 1992. A letter written from Suzanne Alexander's perspective, "Letter to My Students on My Sixty-First Birthday by Suzanne Alexander", was also published in 1992. The Alexander Plays are less overtly surreal than many of Kennedy's earlier works, but still avoid linear narrative. In the foreword to the printed collection of plays, Alisa Solomon, professor in the Graduate School of Journalism at Columbia University, wrote that "the action of these plays is made up not of the events of Suzanne's life but of the process of turning memory into meaning."

== Awards and honors ==
Kennedy won several awards for her plays, including a Stanley Drama Award (1963) from the New York City Writers Conference at Wagner College, two Village Voice Obie Awards. Her Obie Awards were for "Distinguished Play" in 1964 for Funnyhouse of a Negro and "Best New American Play" in 1996 for June and Jean in Concert and Sleep Deprivation Chamber. She was also honored at the 2008 Obie Awards with a Lifetime Achievement Award.

Kennedy was granted a Guggenheim Fellowship for Creative Writing in 1967, Rockefeller Foundation grants in 1967 and again in 1970, a fellowship from the National Endowment for the Arts in 1972, the Creative Artists Public Service grant in 1974, the 2003 Lifetime Achievement Award from the Anisfield-Wolf Book Awards, and the Pierre Lecomte du Noüy Award. Kennedy received the Third Annual Manhattan Borough President's Award for Excellence in the Arts in 1988.

In 1990, Kennedy received the American Book Award.

In 1994, Kennedy won the Lila Wallace Reader's Digest Writers' Award and an American Academy of Arts and Letters award in Literature.

In July 1995, Kennedy was named playwright in residence for the September 1995–May 1996 season with the Signature Theater Company in New York City.

In 2003, Kennedy was awarded an honorary Doctorate of Literature by her undergraduate alma mater, Ohio State University.

In 2006, Kennedy received the PEN/Laura Pels International Foundation for Theater Award as a Master American Dramatist.

In November 2020, the Round House Theatre in Bethesda, Maryland, in association with the McCarter Theatre Center in Princeton, N.J., launched The Work of Adrienne Kennedy: Inspiration and Influence, a digital festival of filmed readings of her plays, which attracted much acclaim.

In 2021, the Dramatists Guild of America named Kennedy as recipient of the Lifetime Achievement Award, presented "in recognition of distinguished lifetime achievement in theatrical writing". The Dramatists Guild's president, Amanda Green, said in a statement: "Adrienne Kennedy has used her immense storytelling skill with beautifully brutal imagery to share her theatrical dreamscapes with the world....From 1964's Funnyhouse of a Negro to 2018's He Brought Her Heart Back in a Box, Adrienne has inspired countless young writers by remaining true to herself and her voice, knowing that what she had to say would resonate."

In 2022, Kennedy was awarded the Gold Medal for Drama from the American Academy of Arts and Letters.

In 2023, Kennedy was honored with a Special Citation from the New York Drama Critics Circle. Her Collected Plays & Other Writings were published in the prestigious Library of America series, on the day before her ninety-second birthday.

== Works ==
=== Plays ===
- Funnyhouse of a Negro, 1964
- The Owl Answers, 1965
- A Rat's Mass, 1967
- The Lennon Play: In His Own Write (adapted from John Lennon's In His Own Write and A Spaniard in the Works with Victor Spinetti), 1967
- A Beast's Story, 1969 (produced with The Owl Answers as Cities in Bezique)
- Boats, 1969
- Sun: A Play for Malcolm X Inspired by His Murder (monologue), 1968
- A Lesson in Dead Language, 1968
- Electra and Orestes (adapted from Euripides' plays), 1980
- An Evening with Dead Essex (one-act documentary drama), 1973
- A Movie Star Has To Star in Black and White, 1976
- A Lancashire Lad (children's musical), 1980
- Black Children's Day (children's play), 1980
- Diary of Lights ("A Musical Without Songs"), 1987
- She Talks to Beethoven (one-act play, later collected as part of The Alexander Plays), 1989
- The Ohio State Murders (one-act play, later collected as part of The Alexander Plays), 1992
- The Film Club (monologue by Suzanne Alexander), 1992
- The Dramatic Circle (radio drama based on The Film Club; published 1994 in Moon Marked and Touched By Sun: Plays by African-American Women, edited by Sydné Mahone), 1992
- Motherhood 2000 (single scene short play), 1994
- June and Jean in Concert (play version of Kennedy's book People Who Led to My Plays), 1995
- Sleep Deprivation Chamber (with son Adam P. Kennedy), 1996
- Mom, How Did You Meet the Beatles? (with Adam P. Kennedy), 2008
- He Brought Her Heart Back in a Box, 2018
- Etta and Ella on the Upper West Side, 2023

=== Other works ===
- "Because of the King of France" (short story), 1960. Published in Black Orpheus in 1963
- People Who Led to My Plays (memoir), 1987. Reissued 2016.
- Deadly Triplets (novella), 1990
- "Letter to My Students on My Sixty-First Birthday by Suzanne Alexander" (essay), 1992
- "Secret Paragraphs about My Brother" (essay), 1996
- "A Letter to Flowers" (essay), 1998
- "Sisters Etta and Ella (excerpt from a narrative)", 1999
- "Grendel and Grendel's Mother" (essay), 1999
- "The Landscape of Memory: Letters From Playwright Adrienne Kennedy" (an email exchange with Juilliard School student Ryan Spahn, 2013)
- "Forget" (poem), 2016; in New Daughters of Africa (ed. Margaret Busby), 2019

=== Collected editions ===
- The Alexander Plays, 1992
- Collected Plays & Other Writings (Marc Robinson, ed.), 2023
