= Almost, Maine =

2004 play by John Cariani

- Logo
- Original language: English
- Written by: John Cariani
- Genre: Romantic Comedy

Premiere
- Date: 2004
- Place: Portland Stage Company; Portland, Maine
- www.almostmaine.com

Almost, Maine is a 2004 American play written by John Cariani, comprising nine short plays that explore love and loss in a remote, mythical almost-town called Almost, Maine. It premiered at the Portland Stage Company in Portland, Maine, in 2004, where it broke box office records and garnered critical acclaim. The play was published by Dramatists Play Service in 2007 and has since become one of the most popular plays in the United States with nearly 100 professional productions and over 5000 community, university, and high school productions to date. It has become one of the most frequently produced plays in North American high schools. It has also received over twenty international productions and has been translated into over a dozen languages.

== History ==
Almost, Maine was developed at the Cape Cod Theatre Project in 2002.

It premiered at Portland Stage Company (in Portland, Maine) in 2004.

Almost, Maine opened Off-Broadway at the Daryl Roth Theatre on 12 January 2006 and closed on 12 February 2006. Directed by Gabriel Barre, the cast included Todd Cerveris, Justin Hagan, Miriam Shor, and Finnerty Steeves. Though this run was brief, the play is featured in Smith and Kraus' New Playwrights: Best Plays of 2006 and was published by Dramatists Play Service in 2007.

It is the most produced play in North American high schools over the past decade.

Almost, Maine is now a novel, published by Macmillan.

== Reviews ==
The New York Times review of the play in 2006 was mixed: “A comedy comprising almost a dozen two-character vignettes exploring the sudden thunderclap of love and the scorched earth that sometimes follows, John Cariani’s play will evoke either awww-s or ick-s, depending on your affection for its whimsical approach to the joys and perils of romance.”

The New York Times review of another production at TheatreWorks in Hartford in 2013 was positive: “John Cariani’s Almost, Maine is a series of nine amiably absurdist vignettes about love, with a touch of good-natured magic realism ... This is a beautifully structured play, with nifty surprise endings (most but not all of them happy) and passing references to characters from other vignettes, which slyly tell us more about them. Mr. Cariani describes the play’s subject as ‘falling in and out of love’. It is just as much about pain.”

Reviews for Transport Group’s 2014 revival of the play were very favorable. The New York Post said: “Mega-hit ALMOST, MAINE lands somewhere between Norman Rockwell and ‘Our Town.’ Unabashedly unhip. There is no pretense of an edge here — the show offers a sweetness and decency that’s become rare at the theater. At this point, it’s a welcome breath of fresh air.”

The New York Daily News said: “Almost, Maine’s charm is real. [It] packs wit, earns its laughs, and, like love, surprises you.”

== Awards and achievements ==
Featured in The Wall Street Journal’s regional roundup of must-see theater in 2004.

Selected by the American National Theatre as one of the most outstanding regional theatre productions of the 2004-2005 season.

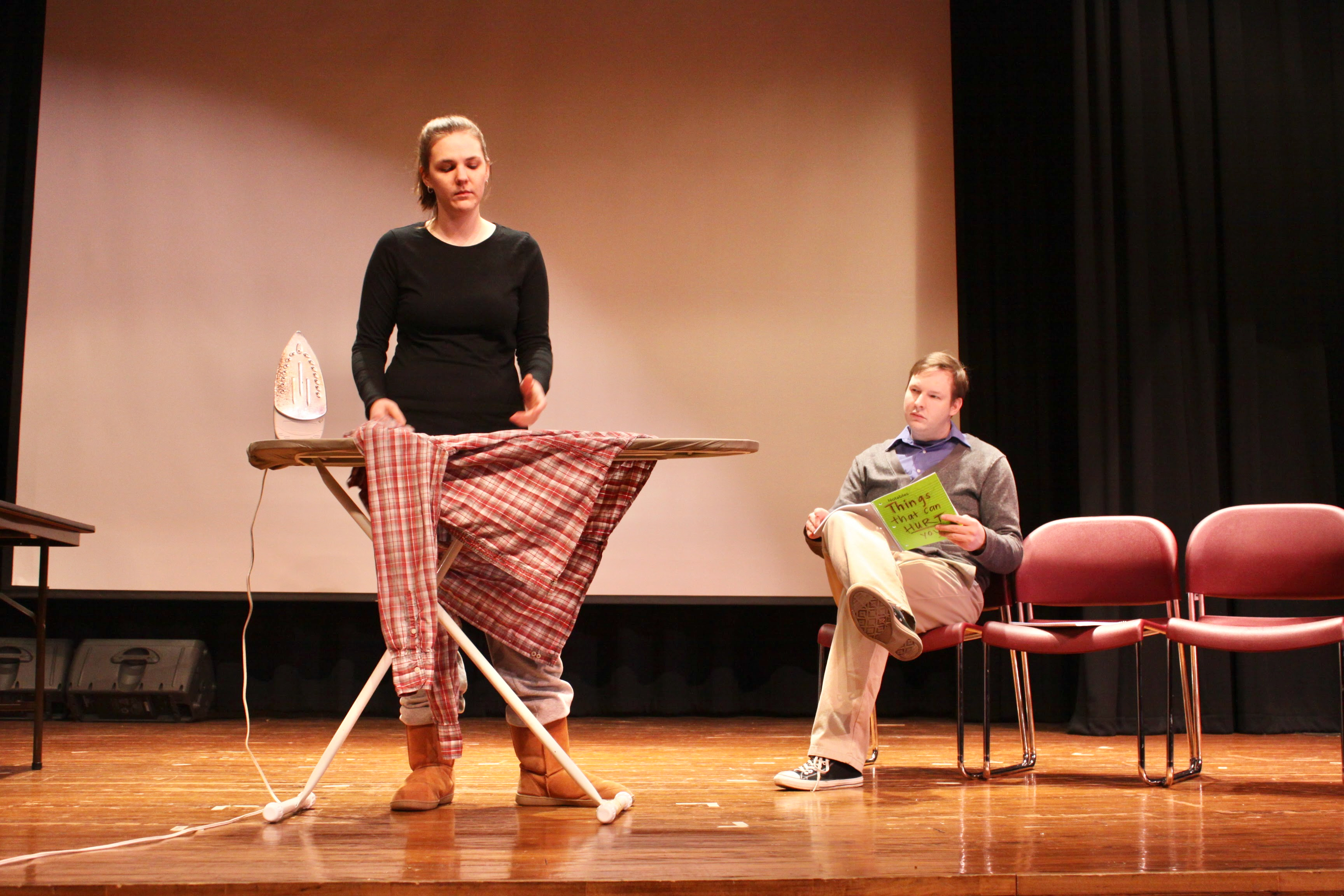
Two actors rehearse a scene from Almost, Maine in Cleveland, Tennessee

Featured in Smith and Kraus' New Playwrights: Best Plays of 2006.

In 2014, Transport Group revived Almost, Maine Off-Broadway. Lincoln Center recorded the production for its Theatre on Film and Tape Archive.

Dramatists Play Service recently published its 80th Anniversary Edition, a boxed set of 8 definitive titles representing each decade of the Play Service’s history. Almost, Maine was selected to represent DPS’ eighth decade.

Almost, Maine was the fourteenth most streamed play of the Covid-19 pandemic.

== Controversy ==
Almost, Maine has been a source of controversy as it became popular in theaters across the United States. Calls to ban, cancel or amend the play have arisen several times.

Two notable calls for the cancellation of the play came in the 2010s.

In 2011, the American Civil Liberties Union of Maryland intervened on behalf of the Bel Air High School students in the Bel Air Drama Company (BADC), urging the Harford County Public Schools “to reverse the decision to remove a scene from BADC’s upcoming performance of Almost, Maine, by John Cariani. We understand that Mr. Schmitz recently decided that BADC could not perform a scene from the play, entitled “They Fell.” In the removed scene, two male characters reveal their romantic love for each other. It is the only portrayal of same-sex love in the play; it is also the only portion of the play that BADC was required to remove from its production. Mr. Schmitz’s decision to censor the play to eliminate representation of same-sex love and gay identity is unlawful and we demand that the decision to remove the scene be reversed.”

In 2014, Maiden High School in North Carolina canceled a production of Almost, Maine after "some parents and area churches complained about the play’s inclusion of a same-sex couple" according to students. Principal Rob Bliss released a statement describing the play as having "sexually-explicit overtones and multiple sexual innuendos that are not aligned with our mission and educational objectives."

Cariani contacted a local news outlet about the controversy and was quoted as saying "I believe the play is about love, not sexual love. The scene with the two young men has no reference to sex at all." Cariani, who is gay, added: "I just think there is a solution other than canceling the production. I’ve reached out to the teacher who applied for rights to the play, but I haven’t heard back. I don’t think the students should have to suffer. They had already purchased the play and started rehearsing for it."

With the involvement of a local teacher, the group performed the play off-campus in mid January, after raising over $6,000 on Kickstarter. The play was directed by a local actor and attorney.
