= Betty Corwin =

American theater archivist (1920–2019)

- Born: Betty Linkoff; November 19, 1920; New York City, U.S.
- Died: September 10, 2019 (aged 98); Weston, Connecticut, U.S.
- Occupation: Theater archivist
- Spouse: Henry Corwin (m. 1943)
- Awards: Tony Award (2001); League of Professional Theater Women, Lifetime Achievement Award (2017)

Betty L. Corwin (November 19, 1920 – September 10, 2019) was an American theater archivist, known for her creation in 1970 of what would become the Theater on Film and Tape Archive of the New York Library for the Performing Arts. Corwin proposed the idea of the archive to the library, volunteering her services for the first four years. She would go on to direct the archive for 31 years, retiring from the position in 2000.

== Life and career ==
Corwin was born as Betty Linkoff in New York City to James Linkoff, a bookmaker, and Mae (née Rosenberg) Linkoff, a homemaker, but grew up in Manhattan. While working as a script reader in a theatrical office, she met Henry Corwin, a dermatologist. She married him in 1943 and then moved with him first to Westport and then finally settling in Weston, Connecticut. While living in Weston, she established and managed a bookstore in Westport while volunteering at the psychiatric emergency department of Jacobi Medical Center in the Bronx, New York.

She died September 10, 2019, in Weston, Connecticut.

== Awards ==
She received a special Tony Award in 2001 for her efforts to archive theater performances. In 2017 she received a Lifetime Achievement Award from the League of Professional Theater Women.
