= Cul-de-sac (play) =

Play by American playwright John Cariani

Cul-de-sac is a play by American playwright John Cariani. Cul-de-sac premiered off-Broadway in April 2006.

== Plot ==
The play tells the story of three small-time suburban families: the Smiths, Johnsons, and Joneses. These neighbors put a significant amount of effort to appear happy.

== Production history ==
Cul-de-sac premiered off-Broadway in April 2006 in a Transport Group production, with Jack Cummings III as director and featuring Cariani performing as Joe Jones. The New York Times described Cul-de-sac as "charming, witty and macabre." Variety called the production "challenging" and "original."

A production of Cul-de-sac was presented at High Point University in April 2016, and the play (directed by Adam Fitzgerald) was performed at the American Academy of Dramatic Arts, New York City, in October 2016. Playbill online reported that he was in the process of revising the piece.

Cariani's play was last presented in 2017 at the Half-moon Theatre in the Hudson Valley. The production was directed by Michael Schiralli and featured Michael Borrelli, Katie Hartke, Sean Hayden, Samantha Jones, Molly Renfroe Katz and Bruch Reed.

Following massive re-writes, the production premiered at the Cape Cod Theatre Project in July 2017. Cariani's work was directed by Tony nominee Moritz von Stuelpnagel and produced by Declan Kunkel. The cast featured Rachel Botchan as Diane, Meredith Holzman as Christy, Charles Socarides as James, Torsten Hillhouse as Brian, Angel Desai as Irene, and Justin Hagan as Joe Jones.
