= John Cariani =

American actor and playwright (born 1969)

- Cariani in 2026
- Born: 1969 (age 56–57); Brockton, Massachusetts, United States
- Education: Amherst College
- Occupations: Actor, playwright
- Known for: Law & Order, Almost, Maine, Fiddler on the Roof, Something Rotten!, The Band's Visit
- Spouse: John Lloyd

John Edward Cariani (born 1969) is an American actor and playwright. Cariani is best known as the forensic expert Julian Beck in Law & Order. On stage, he was nominated for a Tony Award for his role as Motel the Tailor in the 2004 Broadway revival of Fiddler on the Roof. He is also known for his roles in Broadway shows Something Rotten! and The Band's Visit, and for writing Almost, Maine, the most produced play in American high schools in 2016–17.

== Early life ==
Born in Brockton, Massachusetts, Cariani was eight when his family moved to Presque Isle, Maine.

He attended Presque Isle High School where he was active in the music and theater programs. After graduating in 1987, he attended Amherst College, where he was a member of the Zumbyes, Amherst's oldest a-cappella group, and the Glee Club. After graduating from Amherst College in 1991 with a B.A. in history, he studied acting and directing at now defunct StageWest in Springfield, Massachusetts. He then moved to New York at age 27 to pursue acting.

== Career ==
Cariani spent his early years in New York working with the Hudson Valley Shakespeare Festival, and acting in Off-Broadway plays, television commercials, and films.

His first break came in 1999 when he was cast in the Off-Broadway play It's My Party (and I'll Die If I Want To), starring F. Murray Abraham and Joyce Van Patten.

Cariani broke into film and TV in 2000 when he was cast in the independent film, Scotland, PA, opposite Christopher Walken, and guest-starred on the TV series Ed. In 2001, he landed his first major film role opposite Robert De Niro in the Warner Brothers film Showtime. He played forensic expert Julian Beck in the police procedural drama Law & Order from 2002 to 2007.

== Playwriting ==
As playwright, Cariani is best known for his first play, Almost, Maine, which was developed at the Cape Cod Theatre Project in 2002. It premiered at Portland Stage Company (in Portland, Maine) in 2004. Almost, Maine opened Off-Broadway in 2006 and was featured in Smith and Kraus' New Playwrights: Best Plays of 2006.

The play was published by Dramatists Play Service in 2007 and has since become one of the most popular plays in the United States with nearly 100 professional productions and over 5000 community, university, and high school productions to date. Annual surveys by the Educational Theatre Association, conducted from 2009 through (at least) 2017, found that Almost, Maine consistently placed first or second (alternating with A Midsummer Night's Dream) as the most frequently produced full-length play in American high schools.

In 2014, Transport Group revived Almost, Maine Off-Broadway to critical acclaim, with Cariani himself performing in the production. The Advocate named the production to its "Best Theatre of 2014" list, and Lincoln Center recorded the production for its Theatre on Film and Tape Archive.

Dramatists Play Service recently published its 80th Anniversary Edition, a boxed set of 8 definitive titles representing each decade of the Play Service's history. Almost, Maine was selected to represent DPS' eighth decade.

In 2020, Cariani adapted Almost, Maine into a novel, Almost, Maine: A Novel, published by Macmillan.

Cariani's second play, cul-de-sac premiered Off-Broadway in April 2006 in a Transport Group production. The New York Times described cul-de-sac as "charming, witty and macabre." The play was reworked and presented at the American Academy of Dramatic Arts (New York City) and at High Point University (High Point, NC) in 2016 and received further development at the Cape Cod Theatre Project. It received a professional production at Half Theatre in Poughkeepsie in 2016.

Cariani's third play, Last Gas premiered at Portland Stage Company (Portland, Maine) in 2010. Cariani noted that "Almost, Maine is almost a love letter to northern Maine and Last Gas is a more realistic look at that part of the world." It has been described as "a bittersweet romance about two people who lack the courage to admit they love one another ... it's an undeniable winner despite its predictable twist." The play ran at Opera House Arts, Stonington Opera House, Maine, in 2013 and at Geva Theatre Center in Rochester, New York in the winter of 2014. It was published by Dramatists Play Service in 2014.

Cariani's fourth play, LOVE/SICK premiered at High Point University in the fall of 2010, then was presented at the Portland Stage Company in the spring of 2013, and was produced by Hartford TheaterWorks in 2014. The play ran Off-Broadway in February 2015 at the Royal Family Performing Arts Space. The Huffington Post gave the Off Broadway production a positive review: "Sometimes playwright John Cariani looks at the world — actually the worlds of love and relationships — through rose-colored glasses. Just as often he views those worlds through lenses tinted a middling-to-dark-gray or maybe a jaundiced yellow. … While poking fun at the happily-ever-after notion by means of a strong dose of happily-never-after, Cariani shoots his cockeyed valentines with a quiver full of funny lines. He knows how to keep audiences laughing while passing along disappointing news."

LOVE/SICK has been performed in Riga, Latvia and Mexico City and was recently made into a Spanish language feature called Enfermo Amor on Vix+.

Two new vignettes from LOVE/SICK premiered at Stonehill College in Easton, MA for a filmed version of the play, directed by Cariani.

Cariani's most recent play, Darker the Night, Brighter the Stars premiered at Portland Stage on April 2, 2025. Developed as Not Quite Almost and Almost, Almost, Maine, the play revisits the themes of Almost, Maine, based on scrapped scenes. The play premiered in Ellenville, NY at Shadowland Stages later that year, with Cariani directing.

== Personal life ==
Cariani and his husband John Lloyd, a retired NYPD detective, have been together since 1999 and live in the Bronx.

== Filmography ==
=== Film roles ===
| Year | Film | Role | Notes |
|---|---|---|---|
| 2001 | Kissing Jessica Stein | Chuck | |
| 2001 | Scotland, PA | Ed the 'not-too-bright' Cop | |
| 2001 | The Shaft | Security Guard Gary | |
| 2002 | Showtime | Charlie Hertz | |
| 2003 | Robot Stories | Salesman | |
| 2004 | The Reunion | Scott | Short |
| 2004 | Messengers | Derek the Cop | |
| 2008 | High Street Plumbing | Big Boy | Short |
| 2011 | Certainty | Odd Interviewer | |
| 2011 | Henry | Henry | Short |
| 2012 | Elephant Sighs | Joel | |
| 2013 | Sleeping With The Fishes | Louis Belsky | |
| 2014 | Deliver us from Evil | Zookeeper | |
| 2014 | Child of Grace | Ollie | |
| 2015 | Paper Dreams | Ethan | |
| 2018 | Thrasher Road | TSA Supervisor | |
| 2019 | Nasa Seals | Josh Peters | |

=== Television ===
| Year | Title | Role | Notes |
|---|---|---|---|
| 2000 | Ed | Howard Pissle | NBC, episode 1.2: "The World of Possibility" |
| 2001 | Big Apple | ER Doctor | CBS, Episode 1.7 |
| 2001–2003 | Law & Order: Criminal Intent | Perry | NBC, 2 episodes |
| 2002–2007 | Law & Order | CSU Tech Beck | NBC, 26 episodes |
| 2006 | Six Degrees | Blogger | ABC |
| 2009–2010 | Numb3rs | Otto Bahnoff | CBS, 3 episodes |
| 2011 | The Onion News Network | Michael Falk | IFC, 5 episodes |
| 2012 | Homeland | Jeff Ricker | Showtime, episode "The Choice" |
| 2014 | The Good Wife | Stuart | CBS |
| 2015 | The Tonight Show Starring Jimmy Fallon | Himself - Nigel Bottom | NBC |
| 2016 | The Blacklist | Aaron Mulgrew | NBC, episode "Drexel" |
| 2018 | The Marvelous Mrs. Maisel | Hank | Amazon Prime Video |

== Stage appearances ==
Theatre
| Start year | Production | Role | Notes |
|---|---|---|---|
| 1997 | As You Like It | Sylvius | Hudson Valley Shakespeare Festival |
| 1998 | The Winter's Tale | The Clown | Hudson Valley Shakespeare Festival |
| 1998 | Much Ado About Nothing | Verges | Hudson Valley Shakespeare Festival |
| 1999 | Twelfth Night | Andrew Aguecheek | Hudson Valley Shakespeare Festival |
| 1999 | It's My Party | Ted | Arclight Theatre Company |
| 2003 | The Unrepeatable | Robert | The Lark |
| 2004 | Fiddler on the Roof | Motel | Broadway |
| 2005 | Modern Orthodox | Hershel | Ars Nova |
| 2005 | Two Gentlemen of Verona | Speed | Off-Broadway |
| 2006 | Cul-de-sac | Joe | Transport Group |
| 2007 | The Front Page | Mr. Pincus | Williamstown Theatre Festival |
| 2009 | Minsky's | Jason | The Ahmanson |
| 2009 | The Mystery of Irma Vep | Lord Edgar | The Old Globe Theatre |
| 2011 | Much Ado About Nothing | Dogberry | The Old Globe Theatre |
| 2011 | The Tempest | Trinculo | The Old Globe Theatre |
| 2015 | Love/Sick | Various | Off-Broadway |
| 2015 | Something Rotten! | Nigel Bottom | Broadway |
| 2016 | Picnic | Howard | Transport Group |
| 2016 | Come Back, Little Sheba | Postman/Milkman/Messenger | Transport Group |
| 2016 | The Band's Visit | Itzik | Atlantic Theater Company |
| 2017 | The Band's Visit | Itzik | Broadway |
| 2019 | The Music Man | Marcellus Washburn | The Kennedy Center |
| 2021 | Caroline, or Change | Stuart Gellman | Broadway |

== Awards and nominations ==
| Year | Award | Category | Nominated Work | Result |
|---|---|---|---|---|
| 2004 | Tony Awards | Best Featured Actor in a Musical | Fiddler on the Roof | Nominated |
| 2004 | Outer Critics Circle Awards | Best Featured Actor in a Musical | Fiddler on the Roof | Won |
| 2015 | Outer Critics Circle Awards | Best Featured Actor in a Musical | Something Rotten! | Nominated |
| 2015 | Grammy Awards | Best Musical Theater Album | Something Rotten! | Nominated |
| 2019 | Daytime Emmy Awards | Outstanding Musical Performance in a Daytime Program | The Band's Visit | Won |
| 2022 | Grammy Awards | Best Musical Theater Album | Caroline, or Change | Nominated |

== Playwriting bibliography ==
Bibliography
| Year | Title |
|---|---|
| 2004 | Almost, Maine |
| 2006 | cul-de-sac |
| 2010 | Last Gas |
| 2012 | Love/Sick |
| 2025 | Darker the Night, Brighter the Stars |
