= Michael Warren Powell =

American artistic director

- Born: January 22, 1937; Martinsville, Virginia, U.S.
- Died: July 17, 2016 (aged 79); Manhattan, New York City, New York
- Occupations: Theater: Artistic director, director, actor, designer
- Years active: 1960s–2016
- Known for: The Lab, Circle Rep 1985-1996

Michael Warren Powell (January 22, 1937 – July 17, 2016) was an American artistic director, director, actor and designer involved in the Off-Off-Broadway movement, Off-Broadway and in the development of new American plays.

== Early career ==
Originally from Martinsville, Virginia, Powell attended the Goodman Memorial Theater School at the Art Institute of Chicago. In the early 1960s, he moved to New York City with his friend, Lanford Wilson, both aspiring theater artists. The two lived together and formed a personal and professional partnership that lasted for many years.

In New York, Powell worked as a design assistant for a home decorator, Leona Kahn, and became involved with the Caffe Cino as an actor and designer.

== Actor and designer ==
Powell acted in several productions at the Caffe Cino, the coffeehouse theater in the West Village that was founded by Joe Cino and is often described as the birthplace of Off-Off-Broadway.

Plays in which Powell acted include the 1964 debut of The Madness of Lady Bright by Lanford Wilson and directed by Denis Deagan, one of the early plays of the gay theater movement. Powell appeared in So Long at the Fair by Wilson, and the revivals of The Futz and The Clown, for which he also made the costumes. For Wilson's one-act play Home Free! at the Cino, Powell originated the lead role of "Lawrence" alongside Joanna Miles in the other central role, and under the direction of Neil Flanagan.

When Home Free! was offered a production as part of the New Playwright Series at the Off-Broadway Cherry Lane Theatre, Powell again co-starred with Miles, but this time directed by another Caffe Cino regular, Marshall W. Mason. For the Cherry Lane production, Powell designed and constructed an eye-catching set and props. The play, which was on a bill with Sam Shepard’s Up to Thursday and Paul Foster’s Balls, opened in February 1965. It launched Wilson's career. Home Free! later toured to England, Powell reprising his role, now with Claris Nelson as his co-star.

After the founding in 1969 of the Circle Theater Company, later to become Circle Repertory Company or simply Circle Rep, Powell became closely involved as an actor and designer, helping to develop new plays. He also branched out to other theaters, including La Mama, Stage 73 and Theatre of the Eye Repertory Company. In 1990, he took on the original role of Uncle Fred in the Circle Rep premiere of Prelude to a Kiss (play) by Craig Lucas. The production, with Alec Baldwin and Mary-Louise Parker, was directed by Norman René. He also made TV appearances, including in the TV movies Kennedy's Children and Isn't It Shocking?

== Stage director ==
Powell began directing, as well. In 1987 he directed the revival of William M. Hoffman’s As Is (play) at Circle Rep, a production for which he also co-designed the costumes with Susan Lyall. In 1991, he directed The Balcony Scene by Wil Calhoun at Circle Rep with Cynthia Nixon in one of the roles.

Over the years, Powell took on directing assignments at many venues, including at INTAR Theatre, Magic Theatre, Last Frontier Theatre Conference, Wings Theater, Blue Heron Art Center and chashama in New York, and others. In the late 1990s, he directed plays at the Cape Cod Theatre Project, including works by Carter W. Lewis, Lanford Wilson and Clark Middleton.

== Artistic director ==
In 1985, Powell was named the artistic director of The Lab at Circle Rep. The Lab offered opportunities for writers to shape and develop their work in readings and performances. The Lab "was perhaps the most vibrant element of the theater .... At its peak, The Lab was training ground for more than 300 participants," according to Circle Rep co-founder Marshall W. Mason. Powell worked with American playwrights including Terrence McNally, Paula Vogel, Craig Lucas and Lanford Wilson. He was the artistic director of The Lab until Circle Rep closed in 1996.

When Circle Rep closed, Powell formed and became the artistic director of the Lab Theater Company, which later became Circle East Theater Company. The company continued the work of The Lab at Circle Rep by developing and producing new plays. Circle East continued until Powell’s death in 2016.

Beginning in 1995, Powell established The Play Lab at the Last Frontier Theatre Conference, a summer festival in Alaska, originally known as the Edward Albee Theatre Conference. It worked with playwrights to develop their plays and present readings. At the outset, it worked with six Alaskan writers. By 1999, the conference was holding workshops for 54 playwrights from 35 states.

Powell also became the artistic director of the School of Theater of the New York State Summer School of the Arts, a program that nurtures young theater artists chosen from across the state.

== Other ==
From 1995 to 2000, Powell was a Professor of Theater on the Directing Faculty at Rutgers University in New Jersey.
