= Cape Cod Theatre Project =

American theatre company

- Formation: 1995
- Founders: Andrew Polk and Jim Bracchitta
- Type: Staged readings of new plays
- Location: Falmouth, Massachusetts
- Artistic director: Hal Brooks
- Website: capecodtheatreproject.org

The Cape Cod Theatre Project is a nonprofit organization founded in 1995 by actors Andrew Polk and Jim Bracchitta, with the mission of collaborating with playwrights, actors, directors, and the public in developing new American plays. The performances are staged readings, after which the audience members may share their reactions with the playwright and help him/her revise the script. Playwrights who tried out work at the Project in its early years include Paula Vogel and Jeff Daniels. Performances are staged at Falmouth Academy, in Falmouth, Massachusetts.

The Cape Cod Theatre Project also offers an internship program in which young people are able to learn about stage production and theatrical techniques.

== Seasons ==
The Cape Cod Theatre Project produced 64 plays from 1995 to 2012. By year, these plays are:

1995: Scaring the Fist by Ben Bettenbender, directed by Andrew Polk; Stanton's Garage by Joan Ackerman, directed by Christopher Payton;The Vast Difference by Jeff Daniels, directed by Joel Bishoff

1996: Emil by Ben Bettenbender, directed by Andrew Polk; The Mineola Twins by Paula Vogel, directed by Mark Ramont; The Sanctuary Club by Wesley Moore, directed by Chris Payton.

1997: After The Orchard by William M. Hoffman, directed by Joumana Risk; Vick's Boy by Ben Bettenbender, directed by Michael Warren Powell; Miracle Mile written and performed by Clark Middleton, directed by Michael Warren Powell; The Kiss At City Hall by Joe DiPietro, directed by Joel Bishoff

1998: A Sense Of Place by Lanford Wilson, directed by Michael Warren Powell; Birdgirl by Anne Harris, directed by Jim Bracchitta.

1999: Jack, Jesus And The Brazilian Marrano by Daniel Goldfarb, directed by Brad Rouse; One Under by Israel Horovitz, directed by Joel Bishoff; Women Who Steal by Carter W. Lewis, directed by Michael Warren Powell.

2000: Longevity Abbreviated (or for Those Who Don't Have The Time) by Carter W. Lewis, directed by Gabriel Barre; Wilder by Erin Cressida Wilson, directed by Lisa Portes. Musical direction: The Red Clay Ramblers (Jack Herrick, Mike Carver); Modern Orthodox by Daniel Goldfarb, directed by Christopher Ashley.

2001: Lilia! written, performed and directed by Libby Skala; The Infinite Ache by David Schulner, directed by Greg Leaming; Welcome To Westchester by Jeannie Zusy, directed by Lisa Portes; The Treehouse by Etan Frankel, directed by Ethan McSweeny.

2002: Almost Maine by John Cariani, directed by Gabriel Barre; Burning by Joe Hortua, directed by Marshall W. Mason; Are We There Yet? by Garth Wingfield, directed by Ethan McSweeny.

2003: Bay Windows And Shakes by Joe Hortua, directed by Marshall W. Mason; Manuscript by Paul Grellong, directed by Ethan McSweeny; While We Were Bowling by Carter W. Lewis, directed by Gavin Cameron-Webb.

2004: BFE by Julia Cho, directed by Gordon Edelstein; Kitty Kitty Kitty by Noah Haidle, directed by Carolyn Cantor; World Thrown Tizzy by Joe Hortua, directed by Kate Whoriskey; The Ugly American written and performed by Mike Daisey, directed by Jean-Michelle Gregory.

2005: Port Authority Throw Down by Mike Batistik, directed by Gia Forakis; Thanksgiving/Christmas by Joe Hortua, directed by Christopher Ashley; Dearest Eugenia Haggis by Ann Marie Healy, directed by Pam McKinnon; Autobahn by Neil LaBute, directed by Erica Gould.

2006: Badcat by Leslie Ayvazian, directed by Martha Banta; Love Lasts on Myrtle Avenue by Jimmy Breslin, directed by Gordon Edelstein; Essential Self Defense written and directed by Adam Rapp; Have You Seen Steve Steven by Anne Marie Healy, directed by Andrew Polk.

2007: Out Of The Water by Brooke Berman, directed by Trip Cullman; Back Back Back by Itamar Moses, directed by Pam MacKinnon; A Wake On Chappaquidick by Jessica Provenz, directed by Kyle Donnelly; Tongues Will Wag written and performed by Mike Daisey, directed by Jean-Michelle Gregory.

2008: Evie's Waltz by Carter Lewis, directed by Loretta Greco; REALITY! The Musical book by Itamar Moses, lyrics by Gaby Alter and Itamar Moses, music by Gaby Alter, directed by Michelle Tattenbaum; Last Gas by John Cariani, directed by Andrew Polk; Nocturama by Annie Baker, directed by Hal Brooks

2009: Six by Zohar Tirosh, directed by Ian Morgan; Creating Claire by Joe DiPietro, directed by Christopher Ashley; Photograph 51 by Anna Ziegler, directed by Evan Cabnet; Indio written and performed by Aladdin Ullah, directed by Hal Brooks.

2010: Guidance by Daria Polatin, director Mark Brokaw; The Color of Desire by Nilo Cruz, director Carey Perloff; Second Year Senior by Neil LaBute, directed by Andrew McCarthy; The Agony and the Ecstasy of Steve Jobs created by Mike Daisey, directed by Jean-Michele.

2011: The Dark Pines by David West Read, directed by Ian Morgan; 23 Feet in 12 Minutes by Mari Brown, director Pam Berlin; Pookie Goes Grenading by J.C. Lee, directed by Giovanna Sardelli; And When We Awoke There Was Light and Light by Laura Jacqmin, director Jackson Gay.

2012: The Orient Express (Or, the Value of Failure) created and performed by Mike Daisey, directed by Jean-Michele Gregory; American Hero by Bess Wohl director Leigh Silverman; Chrysalis by Joshua Allen, directed by Hal Brooks; The Money Shot by Neil LaBute, director Carolyn Cantor.

2013: Schooner by Rinne Groff, directed by Trip Cullman; The Snow Geese by Sharr White, director Hal Brooks; Grand Concourse by Heidi Schreck, directed by Kip Fagan; Luce by JC Lee, director May Adrales.

2014: The End of Beauty by Cory Hinkle, directed by Mike Donahue; Just Lean Out Your Window and Shout by Hamish Linklater, director Hal Brooks; SeaWife by the Lobbyists and Seth Moor, directed by Liz Carlson; The New Sincerity by Alena Smith, director Stella Powell Jones.

2015: Hillary and Clinton by Lucas Hnath, directed by Chay Yew; Residence by Laura Jacqmin, director Hal Brooks; a way to reach me by Kevin Armento, directed by Ben Kamine; Love Shack in ’87 by Ryan King, director Stella Powell Jones.

2016: The Trump Card created and performed by Mike Daisey, directed by Isaac Butler; Burying Augustus by Ryan King, director Mike Donahue; Unseen by Mona Mansour, directed by Johanna McKeon; 1980 (Or Why I am Voting for John Anderson) by Patricia Cotter, director Hal Brooks.

2017: cul-de-sac by John Cariani, directed by Moritz Von Stuelpnagel; Continuity by Bess Wohl, director Kimberly Senior; How To Load A Musket by Talene Monahon, directed by Hal Brooks; East of West Town by Cusi Cram, director Kip Fagan.

2018: (end of message) by Laura Jacqmin, directed by Monty Cole; The Best We Could by Emily Feldman, director Will Davis; Heroes of the Fourth Turning by Will Arbery, directed by Danya Taymor; Broken by Jon Kern, director Carolyn Cantor; Bearded Ladies by P.K. Simonds, director Adrienne Campbell-Holt.

2019: Pictures from Home by Sharr White, directed by Hal Brooks; Nonfiction by Eboni Booth, director Candis Jones; The Elephants by Mat Smart, directed by Logan Vaughn; The Great Moment by Anna Ziegler, director Branden Abraham.
