= Isn't It Shocking? =

- Title card
- Genre: Horror; Mystery
- Written by: Lane Slate
- Directed by: John Badham
- Starring: Alan Alda; Louise Lasser; Edmond O'Brien; Lloyd Nolan; Will Geer; Ruth Gordon
- Music by: David Shire
- Country of origin: United States
- Original language: English

Production
- Producers: Ron Bernstein; Howard Rosenman
- Production location: Mount Angel, Oregon
- Cinematography: Jack Woolf
- Editor: Henry Berman
- Running time: 74 minutes
- Production company: ABC Circle Films

Original release
- Network: ABC
- Release: October 2, 1973

Isn't It Shocking? is a made-for-television horror mystery film that aired on the ABC network in 1973 as an ABC Movie of the Week. Written by Lane Slate, it stars Alan Alda, Louise Lasser, Edmond O'Brien Lloyd Nolan, Will Geer and Ruth Gordon and was directed by John Badham.

== Plot ==
Daniel Barnes is a small-town New England police chief. His life is complicated by a romance with local motel owner Mrs. Tate. She is eager for him to move in with her and her children; Barnes is equally eager to keep their affair secret. Meanwhile, the village is beset by a killer preying on the town's elderly citizens. A few deaths later, the victims are all found to have one thing in common—they all graduated from the local high school in 1928. Working with police receptionist Blanche, Barnes pores through the 1928 yearbook and identifies another couple, the Yettas, as potential victims. When Barnes drives to the couple's isolated house, his police cruiser is rammed and disabled by another automobile, which turns around to finish him off. Barnes escapes into the woods. Circling around to the isolated house, he finds the Yettas already dead.

After another member of the class is killed, the coroner Lemuel Lovell and his daughter Doc Lovell theorize that a modified defibrillator machine is being used by the murderer to induce heart attacks. Because the Class of '28 was small, the process of elimination leads Barnes to focus on a surviving member of the class, Justin Oates. Until recently, Oates had been a guest at Mrs. Tate's motel. Barnes sets a trap for him. Oates takes the bait. When he is caught, it is revealed that he was traumatically humiliated by his classmates at a surprise birthday party for his 17-year-old fiancée. There, his beloved was discovered frolicking naked with another classmate. After Oates' arrest, Barnes surmises he will likely be remanded to the care of a mental health facility for the criminally insane.

A subplot woven throughout has Barnes considering a lucrative job offer from a nearby town. The pay raise would make it easier for him to settle down with Mrs. Tate and the kids. But Barnes ultimately turns down the offer and decides to stay put. He also considers marriage to Blanche.

== Cast ==
- Alan Alda as Daniel Barnes
- Louise Lasser as Blanche
- Edmond O'Brien as Justin Oates
- Lloyd Nolan as Jesse Chapin
- Will Geer as Lemuel Lovell
- Ruth Gordon as Marge Savage
- Dorothy Tristan as Doc Lovell
- Patricia Quinn as Ma Tate (as Pat Quinn)
- Liam Dunn as Myron Flagg
- Michael Warren Powell as Michael (as Michael Powell)
- Jacqueline Allan McClure as Hattie

== Production ==
The movie is a series pilot and sequel to Lane Slate's 1973 movie They Only Kill Their Masters. In that film, set in a beach community, James Garner portrayed Police Chief Abel Marsh. In 1974, Andy Griffith starred in Slate's Winter Kill, a television movie, a series pilot that renamed the character (Sheriff Sam MacNeill) and changed the setting to a mountain town. When it failed to sell, the main character was renamed Sheriff Sam Adams for the series Adams of Eagle Lake, which lasted a mere two episodes. But that failure wasn't the end of the road. In 1977, Griffith appeared in two additional television movies (The Girl in the Empty Grave and Deadly Game), which restored the name of Griffith's character back to Abel Marsh, though he was still a lawman in a mountain town. With the exception of They Only Kill Their Masters, all the movies and the short-lived series, were filmed in Big Bear Lake, California.
