= New York Public Library for the Performing Arts =

Performing arts library in Manhattan

Coordinates: 40°46′22″N 73°59′03″W

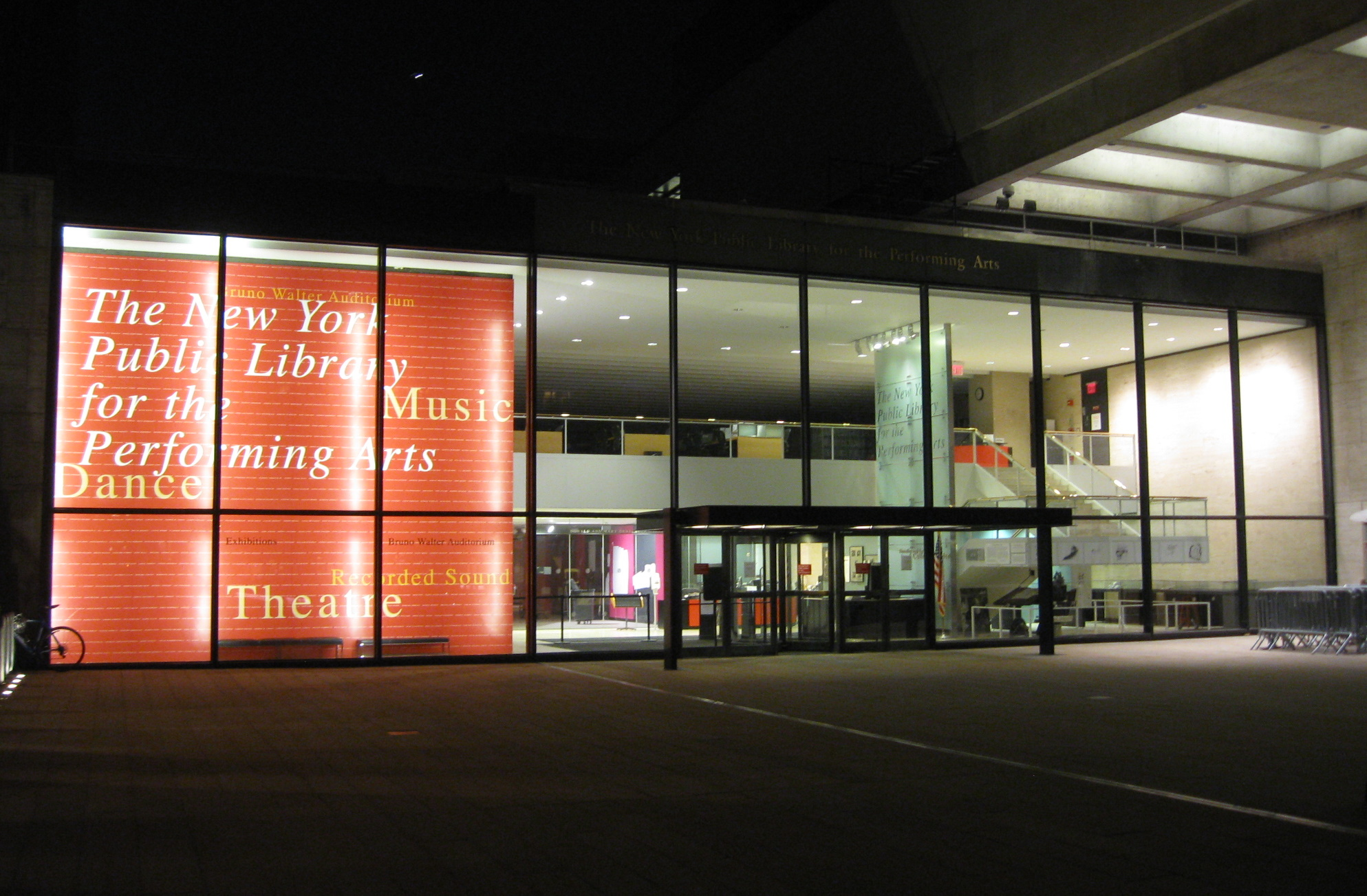
The New York Public Library for the Performing Arts' entrance from Lincoln Center Plaza at night

The New York Public Library for the Performing Arts, Dorothy and Lewis B. Cullman Center, is located at 40 Lincoln Center Plaza, in the Lincoln Center complex on the Upper West Side in Manhattan, New York City. Situated between the Metropolitan Opera House and the Vivian Beaumont Theater, it houses one of the world's largest collections of materials relating to the performing arts. It is one of the four research centers of the New York Public Library's Research library system, and it is also one of the branch libraries.

== History ==
Buildings of Lincoln Center
Buildings and structures in Lincoln Center:
1 Samuel B. and David Rose Building (includes Walter Reade Theater)
2 Juilliard School
3 Alice Tully Hall
4 Vivian Beaumont Theater (includes Mitzi E. Newhouse Theater and Claire Tow Theater)
5 Elinor Bunin Monroe Film Center
6 David Geffen Hall
7 New York Public Library for the Performing Arts (includes Bruno Walter Auditorium)
8 Metropolitan Opera House
9 Josie Robertson Plaza with Revson Fountain
10 Damrosch Park
11 David H. Koch Theater
12 David Rubenstein Atrium
13 Jazz at Lincoln Center

=== Founding and original configuration ===
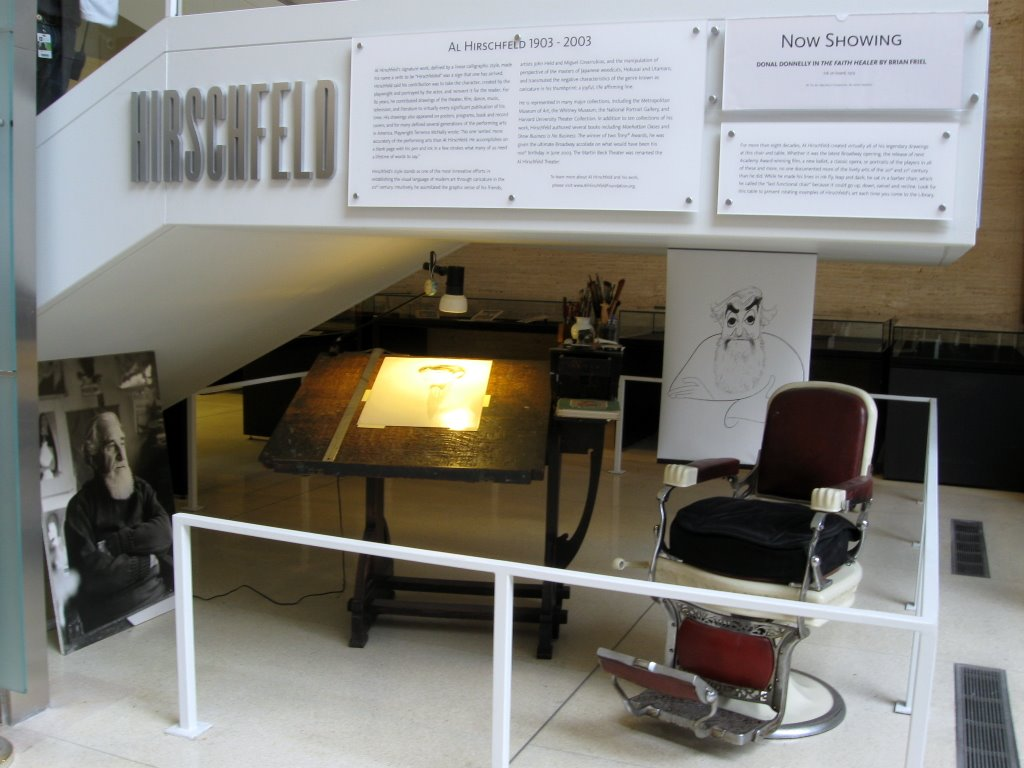
Al Hirschfeld's desk and chair in the library's lobby

Originally the collections that formed The New York Public Library for the Performing Arts (LPA) were housed in two buildings. The Research collections on Dance, Music, and Theatre were located at the New York Public Library Main Branch, now named the Stephen A. Schwarzman Building, and the circulating music collection was located in the 58th Street Library.

A separate center to house performing arts was first proposed by Carleton Sprague Smith (chief of the Music Division) in a 1932 report to the library administration, "A Worthy Music Center for New York." (At the time, dance materials and sound recordings were all part of the Music Division.) There were attempts to create partnerships with Rockefeller Center (under construction at the time), the Museum of Modern Art, and the Metropolitan Museum of Art (to which New York University wanted to join as a partner). During the late 1930s and early 1940s, the Music Division produced a program of concerts (based on the model of the Library of Congress concerts in Coolidge Auditorium). These concerts were often held in conjunction with the Metropolitan Museum of Art and Juilliard School, and the program grew to include Lectures from New York University staff.

After Lincoln Center was incorporated in 1956, an early mention of a possible "library and museum of the performing arts" appeared in June 1957. It was envisioned that a library-museum would serve to "interpret and illuminate the entire range of the performing arts". By December of that year, the library had become an accepted component of Lincoln Center planning and fundraising. Recalling his earlier reports, Smith produced a new report arguing for a move to Lincoln Center. Library administration officially approved of the move in June 1959.

The building housing the library's research collections and the Vivian Beaumont Theater was the third building to be opened at Lincoln Center. Original plans conceived the library as a separate building, but prohibitive costs necessitated a combination of the Library and the Theater. As built, the Theater forms the central core of the building, the first and second floors occupying the southern and western sides, and the third-floor research collections providing a roof. Noted modernist architect Gordon Bunshaft, of the firm of Skidmore, Owings and Merrill (SOM), designed the interiors, and SOM consulted with Eero Saarinen and Associates (architect for the Vivian Beaumont Theater) on the exteriors. The Claire Tow Theater (belonging to Lincoln Center Theater) was built on the roof of the Library and opened in June 2012.

The third floor, housing the research collections, opened to the public on July 19. The entire library was opened to the public on November 30, 1965, the fourth building to open at Lincoln Center. At its opening, it was called "Library and Museum of the Performing Arts". The Library's museum component was named the Shelby Cullom Davis Museum in honor of an investment banker who contributed $1 million to the Lincoln Center for museum purposes.

At its opening, the Library's main lobby at the Lincoln Center Plaza entrance housed a bookstore, a film viewing area, and a listening area. The second floor included a children's performing arts collection as well as the Hecksher Oval, an enclosed space that could accommodate story-telling. Prior to the 2001 renovation, the children's collection was relocated to the Riverside Branch. The Hecksher Oval was removed as part of the renovation.

The Shelby Cullom Davis Museum spaces included small and separate areas in the Dance, Music, Sound archive and Theater research divisions. Bigger galleries were the Vincent Astor Gallery on the 2nd floor, and galleries on the lower level and 2nd floor.

=== 2001 renovation ===
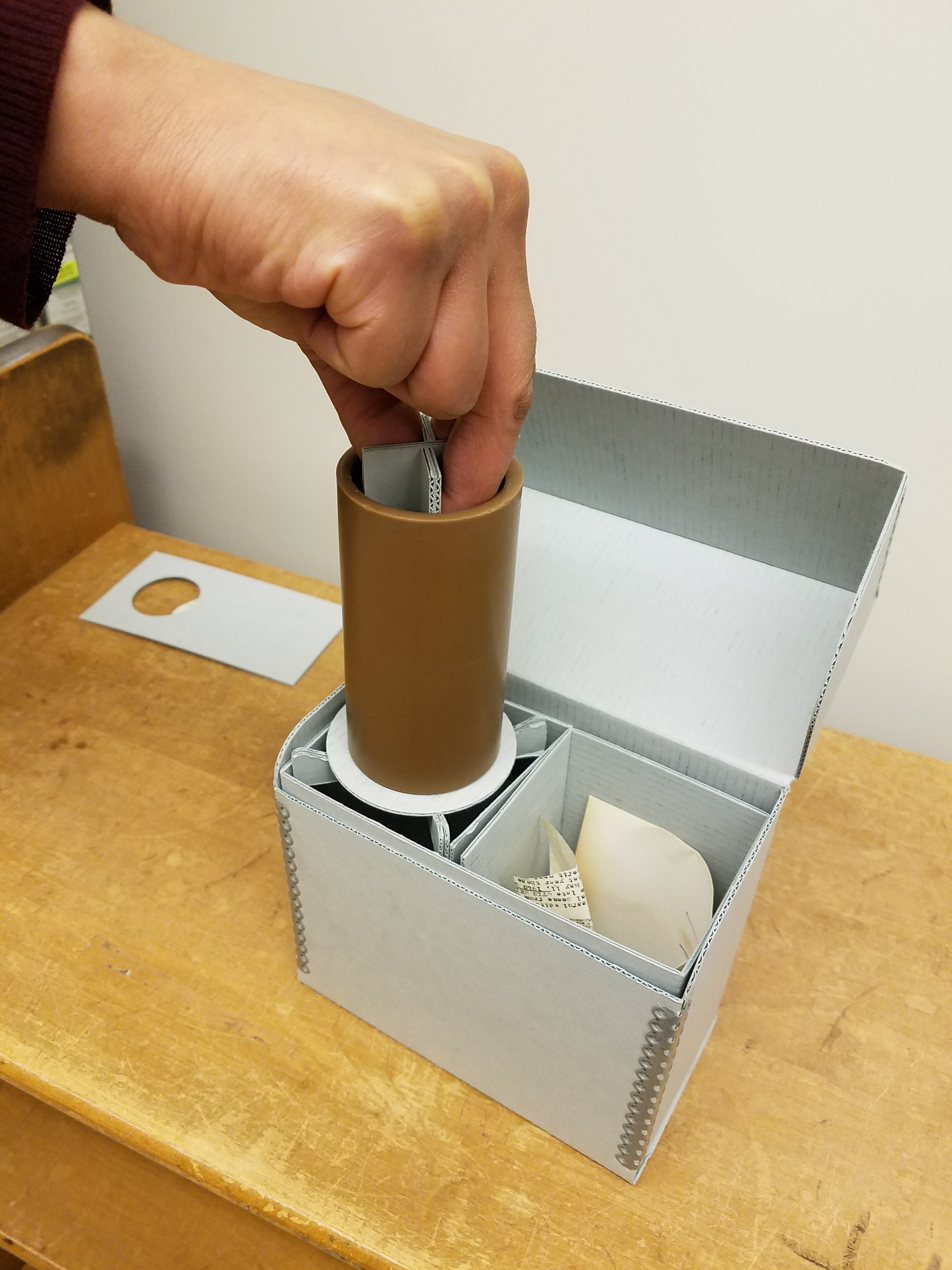
One of the Mapleson Cylinders, among the sound archive's most treasured items

From 1998 through 2001, the building was closed due to a $38 million renovation project designed by Polshek Partnership. (The renovation was unrelated to the Lincoln Center renovations which commenced shortly after 2001.) During this time, the research collections were serviced from the NYPL's Annex (at 10th Avenue and 43rd Street), and the circulating collections were housed in the Mid-Manhattan Library at 40th Street and Fifth Avenue. LPA reopened to the public on October 29, 2001, with its building newly named Dorothy and Lewis B. Cullman Center after a gift from the Cullmans (Dorothy was a trustee until she died in 2009; Lewis died in 2019).

Upon the building's original opening in 1965, each research division had a separate reading room. The renovation removed these and consolidated public areas into a single unified public reading area, with separate rooms for the Theater on Film and Tape Archive (its screening room named for Lucille Lortel) and Special Collections (its room named for Katharine Cornell and Guthrie McClintic). Subsequently the Special Collections reading room was moved into a portion of the main reading area of the third floor, while a screening room for films held by the Jerome Robbins Dance Division and the Reserve Film and Video Collection (originally part of the Donnell Media Center, but absorbed into the Collection in 2008) took its place. Meanwhile, gallery space for the museum was consolidated into two main gallery spaces with smaller areas for display of other items. The Donald and Mary Oenslager Gallery is located on the first floor, adjacent to the Lincoln Plaza entrance, while the Vincent Astor Gallery (formerly on the second floor) is now located on the lower level, adjacent to the Amsterdam Avenue entrance. A small area near the Lincoln Center Plaza entrance houses caricaturist Al Hirschfeld's desk and chair. The main corridors on the first and second floors are used for smaller exhibitions. The third floor has numerous display cases highlighting rotating displays of thematic groupings of artifacts from the collections.

The renovation was not without detractors. Critic Joseph Horowitz criticized the third floor in particular. Where previously each division had its own reading room, the renovation united all public reading areas into one room, resulting in less intimacy and more noise. Edmund Morris characterized the Special Collections reading room as "a charmless space...[which] exudes a dispirited air of neglect."

== Research collections ==
From its inception, LPA has had both a research component (funded mostly with private money) and a branch library component (funded with significant money from New York City, the remainder coming from private contributions).

=== Materials and formats ===
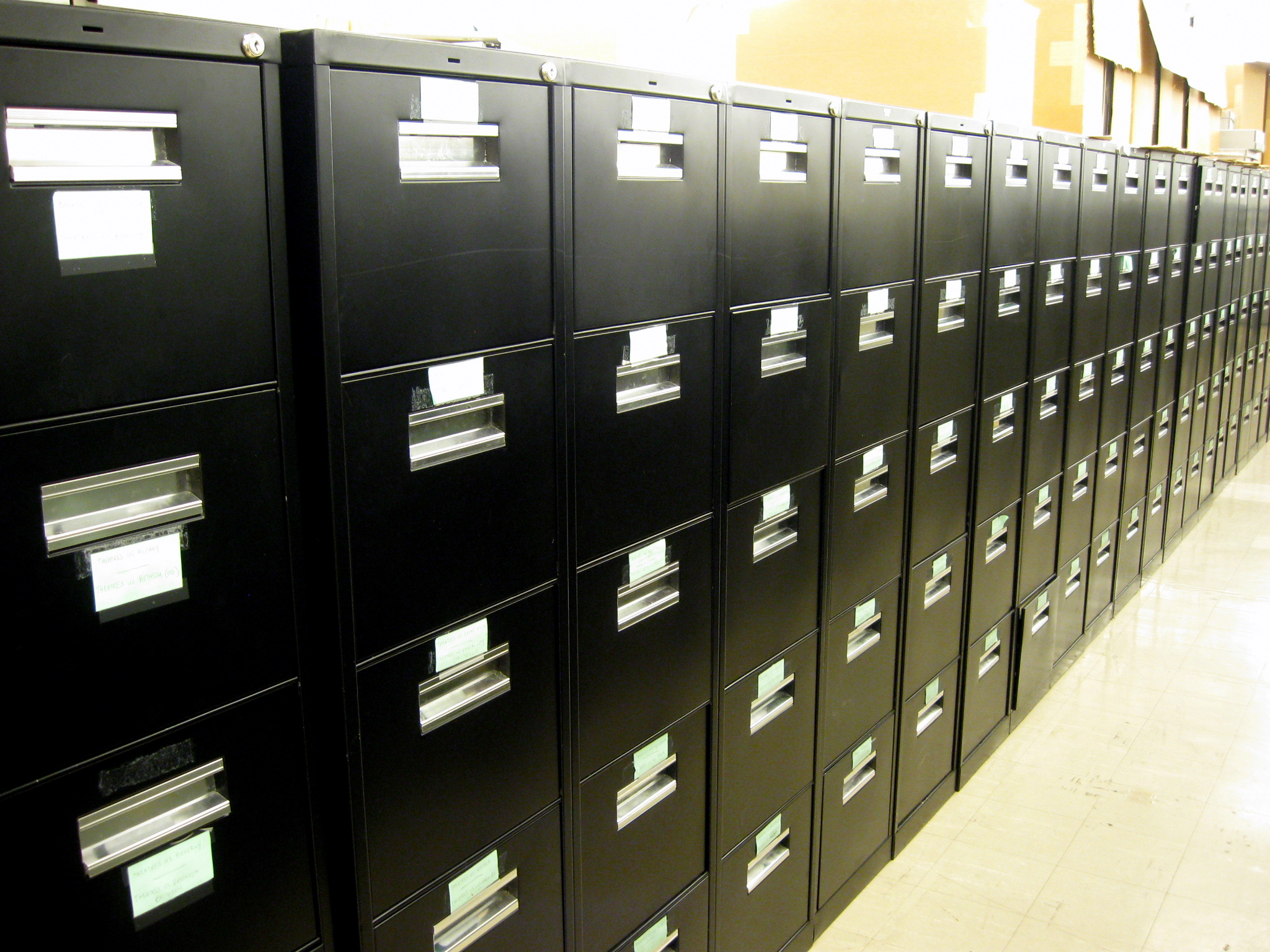
File cabinets contain more than a million clippings at LPA

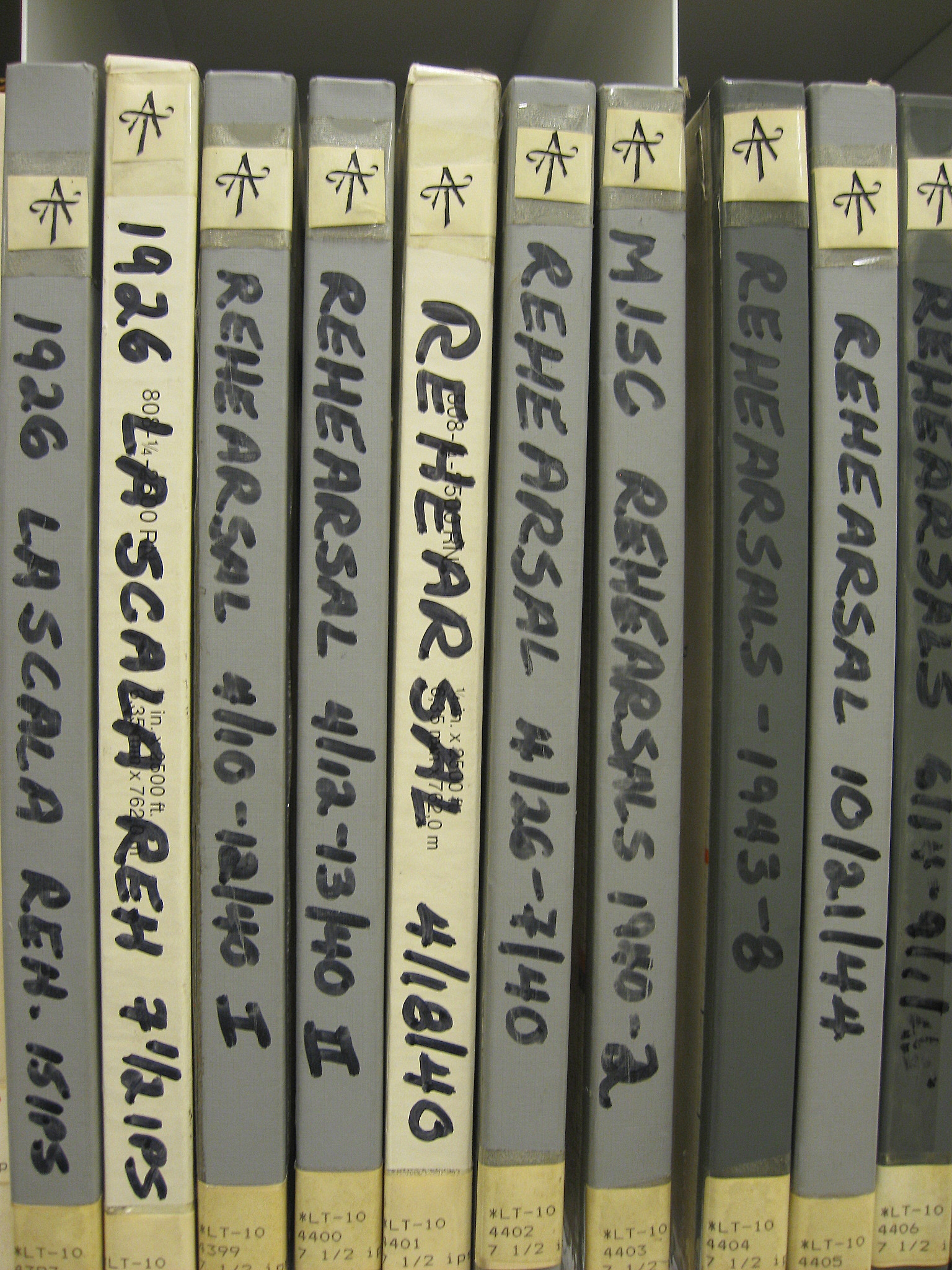
Hundreds of hours of rehearsal recordings feature Arturo Toscanini

In addition to published works (for example, books, periodicals, and scores), the research divisions collect an enormous amount of unique material: Archival material (material that was created by or that once belonged to an individual or organization), text manuscripts, music manuscripts, dance notation scores, typescripts, prompt books, posters, original set and costume designs, programs, and other ephemera are just some of the major categories of materials. The library's collection of sound recordings is in all formats that in themselves trace the history and development of sound recording.

The library has 500,000 folders containing clippings on a variety of people and subjects pertaining to the performing arts. These clippings can sometimes provide a beginning to those at the initial stage of their research. The library also collects a variety of iconography in various forms: photographs, lithographs, engravings, drawings, and others. A recent internal report estimated that LPA holds approximately 4.5 million photographs, including the recently acquired collection of New York photographer Martha Swope, itself holding 1 million photographs.

Much of this non-book material was not initially in the online catalog. Some materials are accessible through in-house card files and indexes. Policy since changed to bring as much of the material as possible into the main catalog, and by 2013, most of it was accessible in the catalog. Because of the enormous volume of material, some classes of it, such as the clipping files, has never been inventoried, although it is arranged in a retrievable manner with an alphabetical or chronological arrangement. Unlike most U.S. public libraries, the research collections stacks are located in non-public areas and are not available for browsing. Patrons must determine what they want to view, fill out call slips, and submit the slips to library staff. Library staff then retrieves the material for the patron.

The holdings of LPA are divided by subject into divisions, which contain a number of special centers.

In 2026, LPA received an anonymous $60 million donation to help fund the digitization of the collection.

=== Music Division ===
The Music Division, as a founding division of The New York Public Library, is the oldest of all the divisions at LPA. Its origins stem from the private library of banker Joseph William Drexel. Upon his death in 1888, his valuable library of 5,542 volumes and 766 pamphlets, known as the Drexel Collection, became part of the Lenox Library. The Astor Library also had an endowment that helped with the purchase of music. In 1895, upon the Lenox Library's consolidation with the Astor Library, the Music Division became one of the first subject divisions of The New York Public Library.

According to The New Grove Dictionary of Jazz, the library has particular strong manuscript holdings in jazz, These include 400 of Benny Goodman's arrangements, and the arrangements made by Sy Oliver for musicians including Duke Ellington, Jimmie Lunceford, and Tommy Dorsey. It holds working scores of works by Ellington, and by Charles Mingus as well as extensive microfilm copies of Mingus' manuscripts.

Classical music manuscript holding include manuscripts by Bach, Johannes Brahms, Franz Liszt, Glinka, Handel, Haydn, Korngold, Mozart, Paganini, Schubert, and Schumann.

=== Billy Rose Theatre Division ===
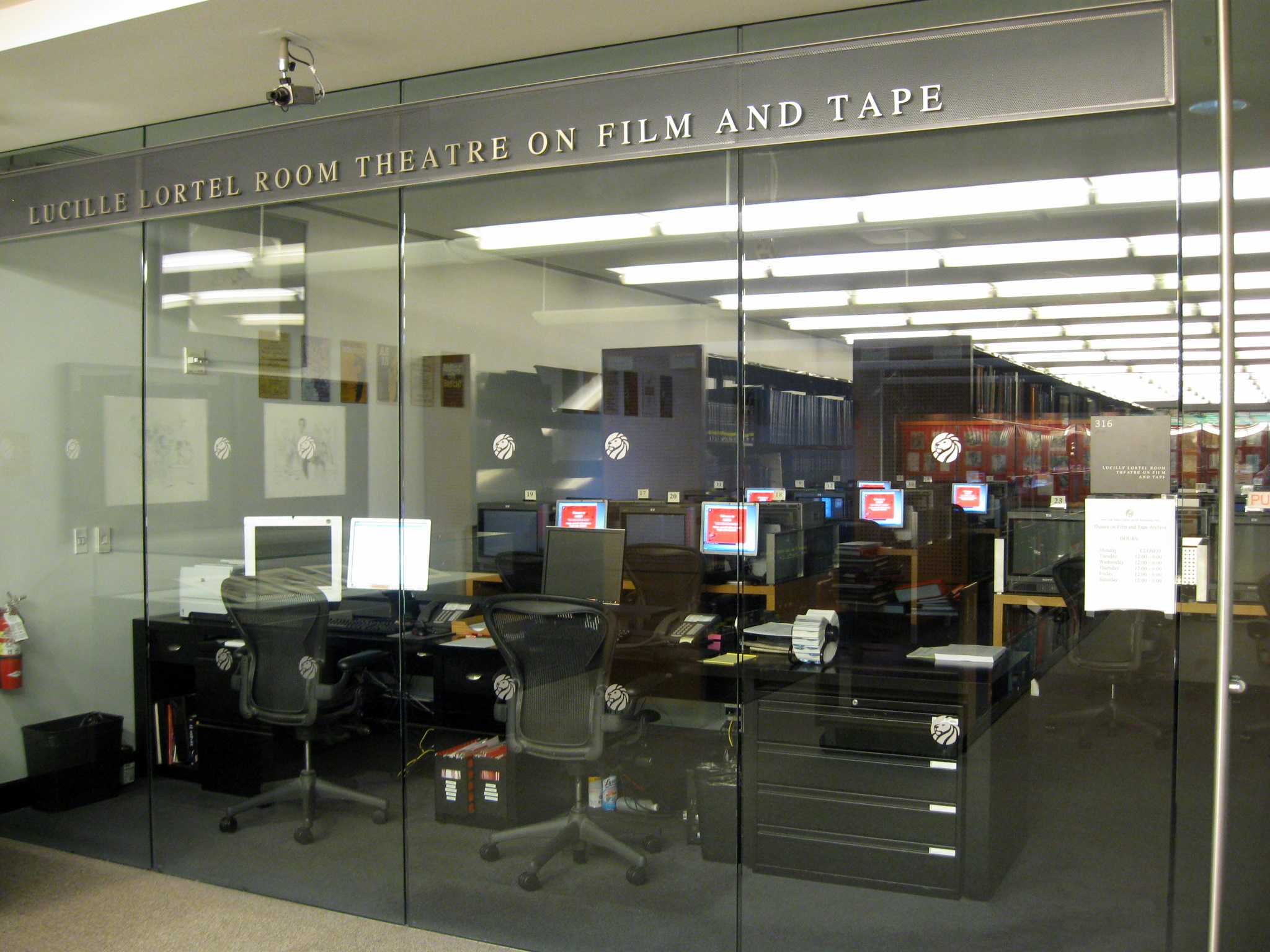
Theatre on Film and Tape room – dedicated to donor Lucille Lortel

The Library has been collecting theatrical materials for years prior to 1931, when the executors of David Belasco's estate offered the producer's holdings on the condition that a division be created. The Theatre Collection (as it was initially known) began on September 1, 1931. The division opened at Lincoln Center as the Theatre Collection. In 1956 the theatre collection of the New York Public Library was recognized with a Special Tony Award. In 1979, it was renamed the Billy Rose Theatre Division, honoring a financial gift from the lyricist/producer's foundation. It is now the largest research division at the library, with holdings primarily on the theatre, and increasing on film, with some collections on the related subjects of vaudeville, magic, puppetry, and the circus. The Theater of Film and Tape Archive is administratively within the division.

The Theatre division includes the Theatre on Film and Tape Archive (TOFT) which produces video recordings of New York and regional theater productions, and provides research access at its Lucille Lortel screening room. The collection is considered one of the most comprehensive collections of videotaped theater productions in the world. Archives modeled on TOFT include the Museum of Performance & Design in San Francisco, the Washington Area Performing Arts Video Archive established in Washington, D.C., and the National Video Archive of Performance in London. The core of the collection consists of live recordings of Broadway and Off-Broadway productions, with some additional productions from professional regional theaters. The Archive also records interviews and dialogues with notable theater professionals. In addition to live performances, commercial recordings of theater-related films, documentaries, and television programs are also included in the collection. Currently between 50 and 60 live recordings are produced each year, covering most important productions. As of fall of 2016, the collection included 7,901 titles.

=== Jerome Robbins Dance Division ===
The Jerome Robbins Dance Division began in 1944 under the auspices of Genevieve Oswald. Originally dance materials were part of the Music Division (when it was known as the "Dance Collection"), but its growth necessitated hiring a full-time staff member in 1947. Acquisitions were augmented by gifts of papers of Ted Shawn and Ruth St. Denis, Doris Humphrey, Charles Weidman, and Hanya Holm. With the gift of a collection of Walter Toscanini in honor of his deceased wife, Cia Fornaroli (a dancer), the Dance Collection became an internationally known repository. Due to its subsequent growth and increasing importance, the collection was formally recognized as a separate division on January 1, 1964.

One of the division's most significant resources is the Jerome Robbins Archive of the Recorded Moving Image. Endowed with a gift from Jerome Robbins, this archive collects and preserves moving images of dance, making them available to researchers. The Archive has received many gifts from dancers and choreographers and contains many privately made films and video.

The Division's oral history program began formally in 1965. These oral histories are particularly valuable since they provide information, history and context not generally available in published sources.

=== Reserve Film and Video ===
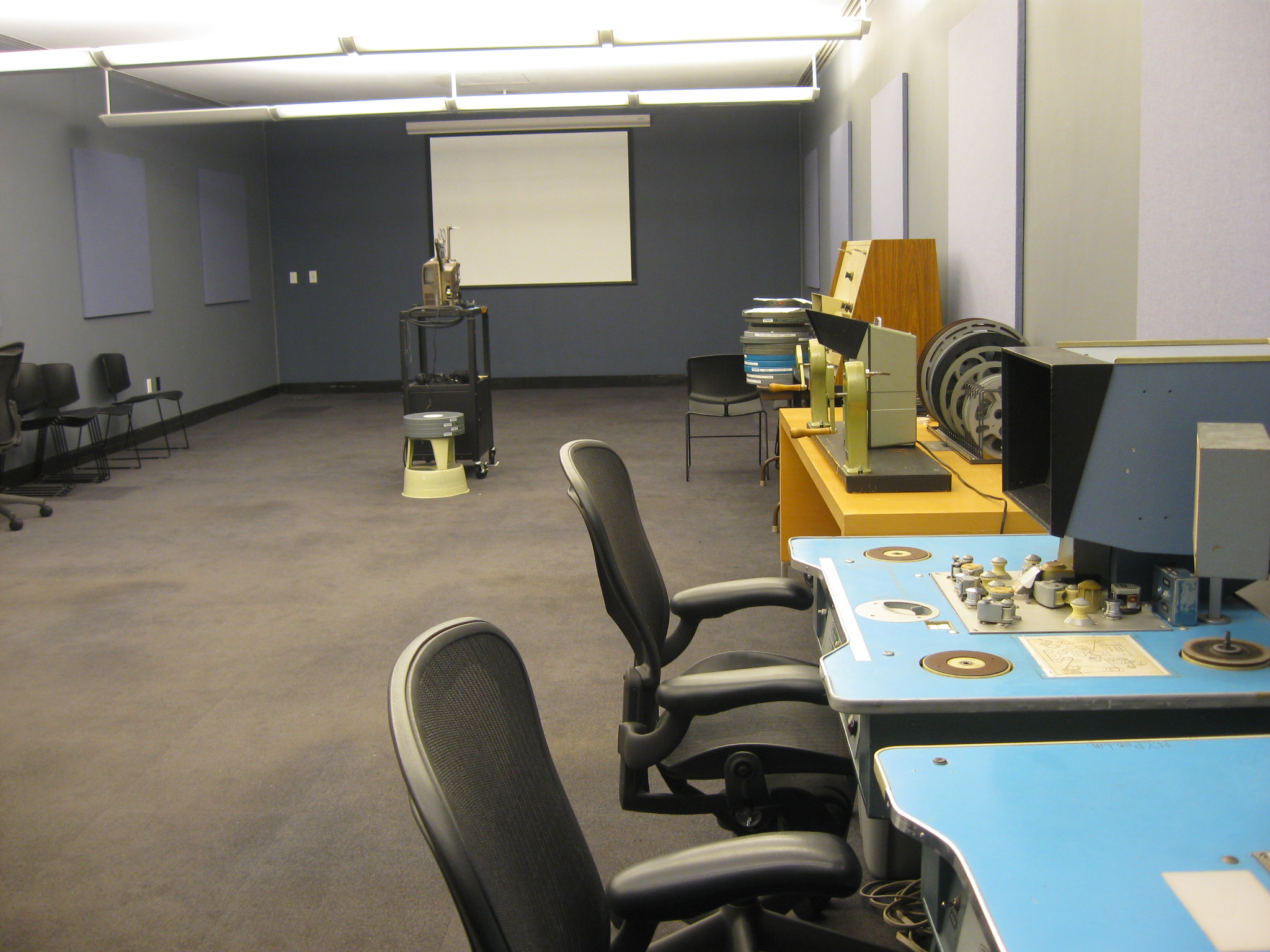
Screening room for the Reserve Film and Video collection; moviola and Steenbeck equipment are on the right

Though not technically a part of the Research divisions, the Reserve Film and Video Collection (formerly the Donnell Media Center) is serviced from the third floor. For film and video that must be viewed onsite, there is a screening room (large enough for classes) equipped with a 16 mm projector. There are also moviolas and Steenbeck equipment, permitting close frame-by-frame examination and analysis.

=== Rodgers and Hammerstein Archives of Recorded Sound ===
The origins of the Rodgers and Hammerstein Archives of Recorded Sound can be traced to a gift of 500 78-rpm records by Columbia Records in 1937 to the Music Division. Successive gifts by record companies and individuals led to the formal creation of a separate division with the opening of the building at Lincoln Center in 1965. It was named in exchange for a private donation from the Rodgers and Hammerstein organization. Radio station WQXR donated 11,000 78 rpm recordings in 1966. Carleton Sprague Smith envisioned the purpose of the sound archive as "stimulating interest among recording and broadcasting executives, as well as other arts institutions that had potential for playing a cooperative role." Resources include the Rigler-Deutsch Index, which lists of library's extensive holdings of 78 rpm records.

== Branch (Circulating) Collections ==
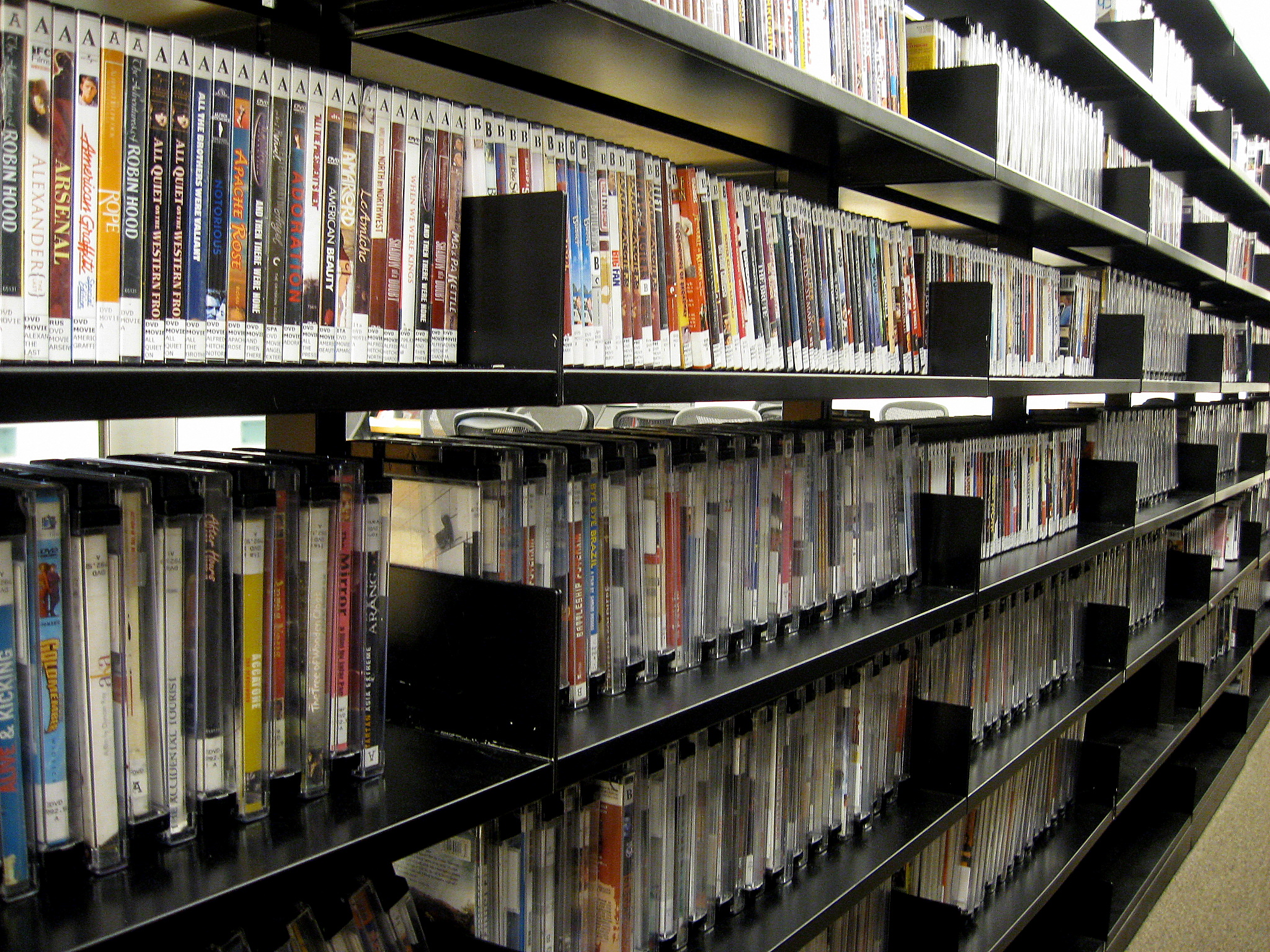
A portion of the circulating DVDs

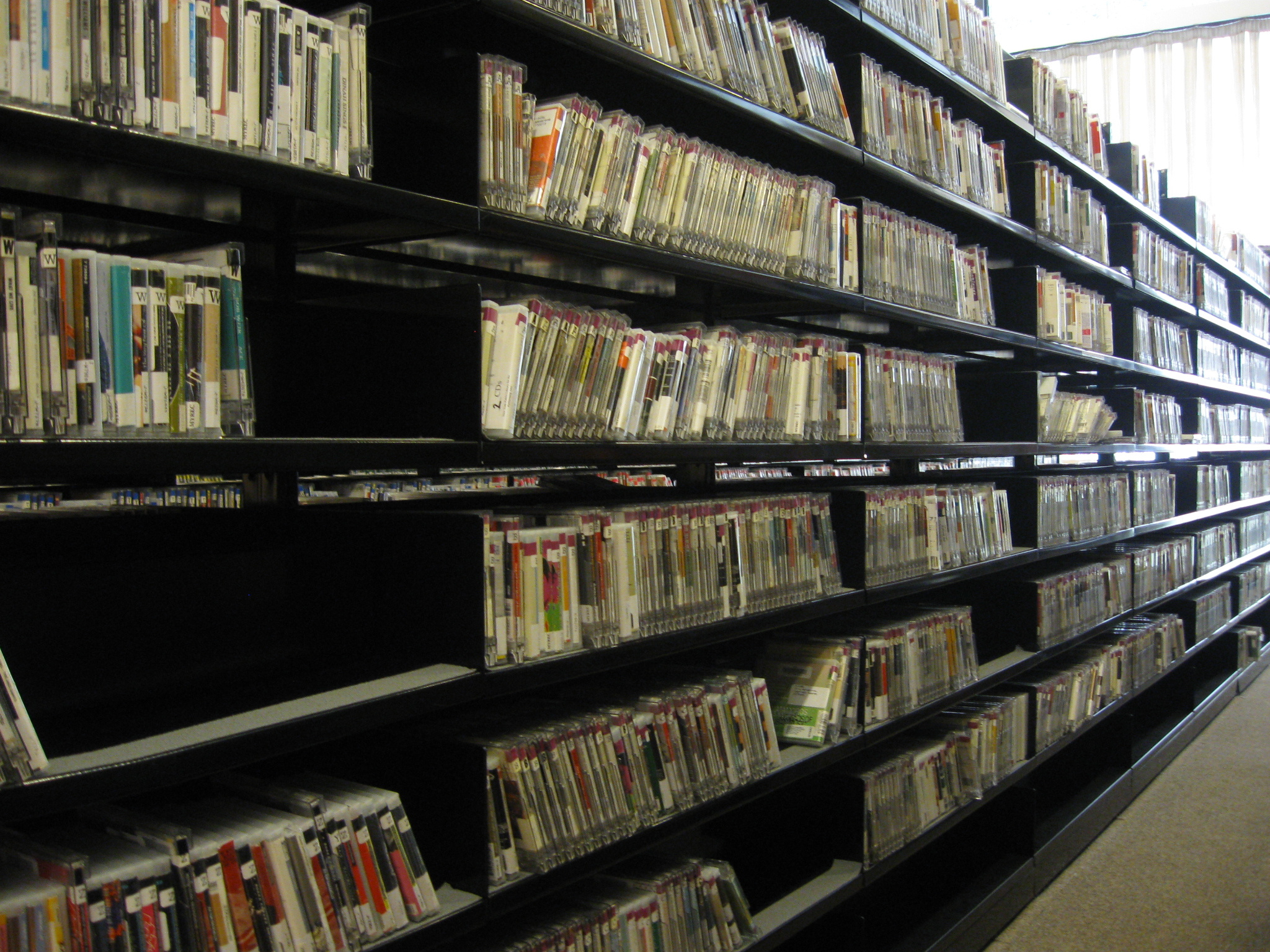
Circulating CDs

The beginnings of the circulating music collection are due in great part to its first head librarian, Dorothy Lawton. Lawton took part in the establishment of the music collection at the 58th Street Library in 1920, beginning with a collection of 1,000 books and scores. In 1924, the circulating music collection was officially established as part of the 58th Street Library. Her passion for dance enabled her to get unusual publications, so much that dance critic John Martin complimented her on the growing collection of dance books.

In 1929, the 58th Street Library began a collection of recordings beginning with gifts from Victor and Columbia records, amounting to 500 records. Upon building a listening booth, Lawton reported that by 1933, the listening booth was constantly booked two weeks in advance.

During World War II, she established a concert series for servicemen on Sundays from 3–7 PM. Servicemen could request selections of their choice and could also participate in playing chamber music with instruments that had been loaned to the Library. She established the Orchestra Collection, a set of scores and parts that could be loaned to groups for performance. Currently, the Orchestra Collection loans parts to more than 2,000 works.

Upon Lawton's retirement in 1945, chief music critic of The New York Times Olin Downes complimented her on the development of the 58th Street Library, and remarked on her achievements such as attracting donors and enlisting the concern and help of professional musicians. (Many of the rare items that were gifts to the 58th Street Branch were subsequently moved to the Music Division.)

After retiring, Lawton returned to the country of her birth, England, and help organize a newly created music collection at Central Music Library of the Buckingham Palace Road Library (today the Westminster Music Library, modeling the new library on the one she established at 58th Street. Currently, the Circulating collections loan books on music, dance, theater, film, and arts administration. They also loan scores, scripts, CDs, videotapes, DVDs, and sets of orchestral parts.

== Shelby Cullom Davis Museum ==
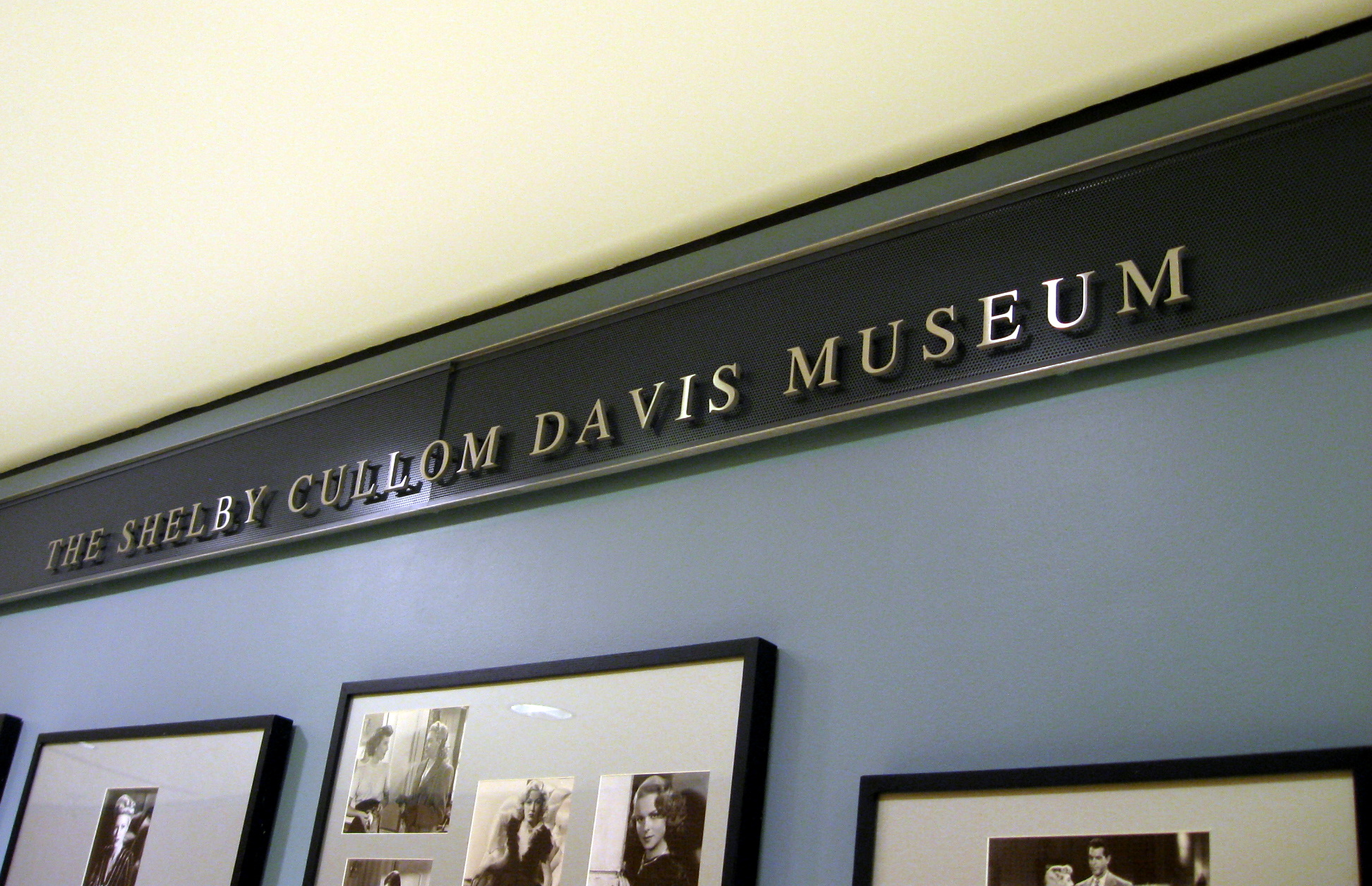
A display wall of the Shelby Cullom Davis Museum

The museum component of LPA takes the form of exhibitions in its two main exhibition spaces, The Donald and Mary Oenslager Gallery and the Vincent Astor Gallery, as well as a walled area in the plaza entrance, and additionally display cases distributed throughout the building. Among the purposes of the exhibitions is to show to all visitors that the millions of items belonging to the library are not for the exclusive use of scholars but for anyone who walks in the door. Exhibitions highlights items from the library's collections and keep the name of the library before the public, attracting new and potential donations.

Since the late 1990s, NYPL's exhibitions program has added online exhibitions. Online exhibitions serve as an extension of physical exhibitions, adding more material or allowing a greater depth of exploration.

== Public programs ==
Public programs are free of charge and take place in the 202-seat Bruno Walter Auditorium located on the lower level. The auditorium is used several times a week for musical performances, film screenings and lectures.

== See also ==
- List of New York Public Library branches
