= Martha Banta =

American literary scholar (1928–2020)

Martha Banta (May 11, 1928 – March 31, 2020) was an American literary scholar.

Martha Banta was born on May 11, 1928, in Muncie, Indiana. She received a BA from Indiana University in 1950 and a PhD, also from Indiana, in 1964. She taught English at the University of California, Los Angeles, from 1983 onwards, and was named a distinguished professor there.

In 1982, she was awarded a Guggenheim Fellowship. From 1990 to 1991, Banta was the president of the American Studies Association. She received the Carl Bode–Norman Holmes Pearson Prize for Lifetime Achievement and Service from the ASA in 2002.

From 1997 to 2000, she edited PMLA, the journal of the Modern Language Association.

Banta died on March 31, 2020, in Pasadena, California.

== Works ==
- Henry James and the Occult: The Great Extension (Indiana University Press, 1972)
- Failure and Success in America: A Literary Debate (Princeton University Press, 1978)
- Imaging American Women: Idea and Ideals in Cultural History (Columbia University Press, 1987)
- Taylored Lives: Narrative Productions in the Age of Taylor, Veblen, and Ford (University of Chicago Press, 1993)
- Barbaric Intercourse: Caricature and the Culture of Conduct, 1841–1936 (University of Chicago Press, 2003)
- One True Theory and the Quest for an American Aesthetic (Yale University Press, 2007)
- Henry James: An Alien's "History" of America (Sapienza Università Editrice, 2016)
