= Transport Group =

Non-profit off-Broadway theatre company in New York

Transport Group Theatre Company is a non-profit, off-Broadway theatre company in New York City that stages new works and revivals of plays and musicals, with a focus on American stories told in a visually progressive way.

== History ==
Transport Group was founded in 2001 by co-Artistic Directors Jack Cummings III and Robyn Hussa. Since 2007, Transport Group was helmed by Cummings as artistic director and Lori Fineman as executive director. Denise Dickens replaced Fineman in 2019. Through its first eight years, Transport Group was a resident theatre company at The Connelly Theatre; an off-Broadway venue in Manhattan's East Village. Transport Group has produced several environmental productions including the OBIE Award winning The Boys in the Band, which seated the audience in chairs around the play's living room set in a Chelsea penthouse, and the first New York revival of Michael John LaChiusa's Hello Again, in which round banquet tables doubled as both the audience seating and the actors' playing space.

Transport Group has also produced works at The Duke Theatre in Times Square, The Gym at Judson in the West Village, and Carnegie Hall. In 2007, Transport Group received a special Drama Desk Award for its "breadth of vision and presentation of challenging productions."

Transport Group creates unexpected theatrical experiences that allow audiences and artists to collaboratively explore the "American identity." Transport Group has produced 37 shows total: 16 new works and 21 revivals, which have included 14 world premieres, 3 New York premieres, and 6 commissioned works. Transport Group is the winner of 9 OBIE Awards, 3 Off-Broadway Alliance Awards, a Dramatists Guild Award, and a 2018 Special Citation from the New York Drama Critics' Circle, has been nominated for 46 Drama Desk Awards, as well as 6 Outer Critics Circle Awards, 8 Drama League Awards, 9 Off-Broadway Alliance Awards, and 4 Lucille Lortel Awards, among others. The company received a special Drama Desk award for its "breadth of vision and presentation of challenging productions." Adam Mathias won the Drama Desk Award for Outstanding Lyrics in 2011 for See Rock City & Other Destinations. Also in 2011, Transport Group's production of the Douglas Carter Beane/Lewis Flinn musical Lysistrata Jones transferred to Broadway and was nominated for a Tony Award.

The American Theatre Wing awarded Transport Group with a National Theatre Company Grant in 2011.

== Production history ==
2002: Our Town by Thornton Wilder; The Connelly Theatre

2003: Requiem for William by William Inge; The Connelly Theatre

2004: First Lady Suite, words & by Michael John LaChiusa; The Connelly Theatre

2005: The Audience conceived by Jack Cummings III; The Connelly Theatre

2005: Normal, book by Yvonne Adrian, lyrics by Cheryl Stern, music by Tom Kochan; The Connelly Theatre

2006: cul-de-sac by John Cariani; The Connelly Theatre

2006: All The Way Home by Tad Mosel; The Connelly Theatre

2007: The Dark at the Top of the Stairs by William Inge; The Connelly Theatre

2007: Crossing Brooklyn, music by Jenny Giering and Jonathan Larson, book & lyrics by Laura Harrington; The Connelly Theatre

2008: Marcy in the Galaxy, music & lyrics by Nancy Shayne, book by Michael Patrick King; The Connelly Theatre

2008: Bury the Dead by Irwin Shaw; The Connelly Theatre

2009: Being Audrey, music & lyrics by Ellen Weiss, book by James Hindman, additional book and lyrics by Cheryl Stern

2010: The Boys in the Band by Mart Crowley; 37 West 26th Street, Manhattan

2010: See Rock City & Other Destinations, music by Brad Alexander, book & lyrics by Adam Mathias; The Duke on 42nd Street

2011: Hello Again, words & music by Michael John LaChiusa; 52 Mercer Street, Manhattan

2011: Lysistrata Jones, music & lyrics by Lewis Flinn, book by Douglas Carter Beane; The Gym at Judson

2011: The Patsy by Barry Conners; starring David Greenspan directed by Jack Cummings III;The Duke on 42nd Street

2011: Jonas by David Greenspan; The Duke on 42nd Street

2011: Queen of the Mist, words & music by Michael John LaChiusa; The Gym at Judson

2012: House for Sale by Jonathan Franzen, adapted for the stage by Daniel Fish; The Duke on 42nd Street

2013: The Memory Show, book & lyrics by Sara Cooper, music by Zach Redler; The Duke on 42nd Street

2014: Almost, Maine, by John Cariani; The Gym at Judson

2014: I Remember Mama, by John Van Druten; The Gym at Judson

2015: Three Days To See: A Reawakening of Helen Keller in Her Own Words, conceived by Jack Cummings III; Theatre 79

2015: Once Upon A Mattress, book by Jay Thompson, Dean Fuller, Marshall Barer, lyrics by Marshall Barer, music by Mary Rogers; Abrons Arts Center

2017: Picnic (play), by William Inge, The Gym at Judson

2017: Come Back, Little Sheba, by William Inge, The Gym at Judson

2017: Strange Interlude, by Eugene O'Neill; starring David Greenspan; "Irondale Theatre Center"

2018: Summer and Smoke, by Tennessee Williams; Classic Stage Company

2018: Renascence, book by Dick Scanlan, music by Carmel Dean; lyrics from the poetry of Edna St. Vincent Millay; Abrons Arts Center

2019: The Trial of the Catonsville Nine (play), by Daniel Berrigan, adapted by Jack Cummings III;Abrons Arts Center

2020: Broadbend, Arkansas, Libretto by Ellen Fitzhugh & Harrison David Rivers, Music and Additional Lyrics by Ted Shen, directed by Jack Cummings III; The Duke on 42nd Street

2020: The Unsinkable Molly Brown, Music and Lyrics by Meredith Willson, Book and New Lyrics by Dick Scanlan, Based on the Original Book by Richard Morris, Meredith Willson's Music Adapted by Michael Rafter, Directed and Choreographed by Kathleen Marshall; Abrons Arts Center

2022: The Patsy by Barry Conners; starring David Greenspan directed by Jack Cummings III; Abrons Arts Center

2022: A Delicate Balance by Edward Albee produced in partnership with NAATCO; directed by Jack Cummings III; The Connelly Theatre. This historic production was the first time the play was done Off-Broadway and the first time with an all-Asian American cast.

2024: On Set with Theda Bara by Joey Merlo; starring David Greenspan, directed by Jack Serio; The Brick Theater

2024: Follies in Concert; music and lyrics by Stephen Sondheim, book by James Goldman; Carnegie Hall

2025: Bus Stop by William Inge co-produced with Classic Stage Company and the National Asian American Theatre Company; directed by Jack Cummings III; Lynn F. Angelson Theater

2025: Hello, Dolly! in Concert; book by Michael Stewart, music and lyrics by Jerry Herman; Carnegie Hall
