= Theatre on Film and Tape Archive =

Video archive of New York theater productions

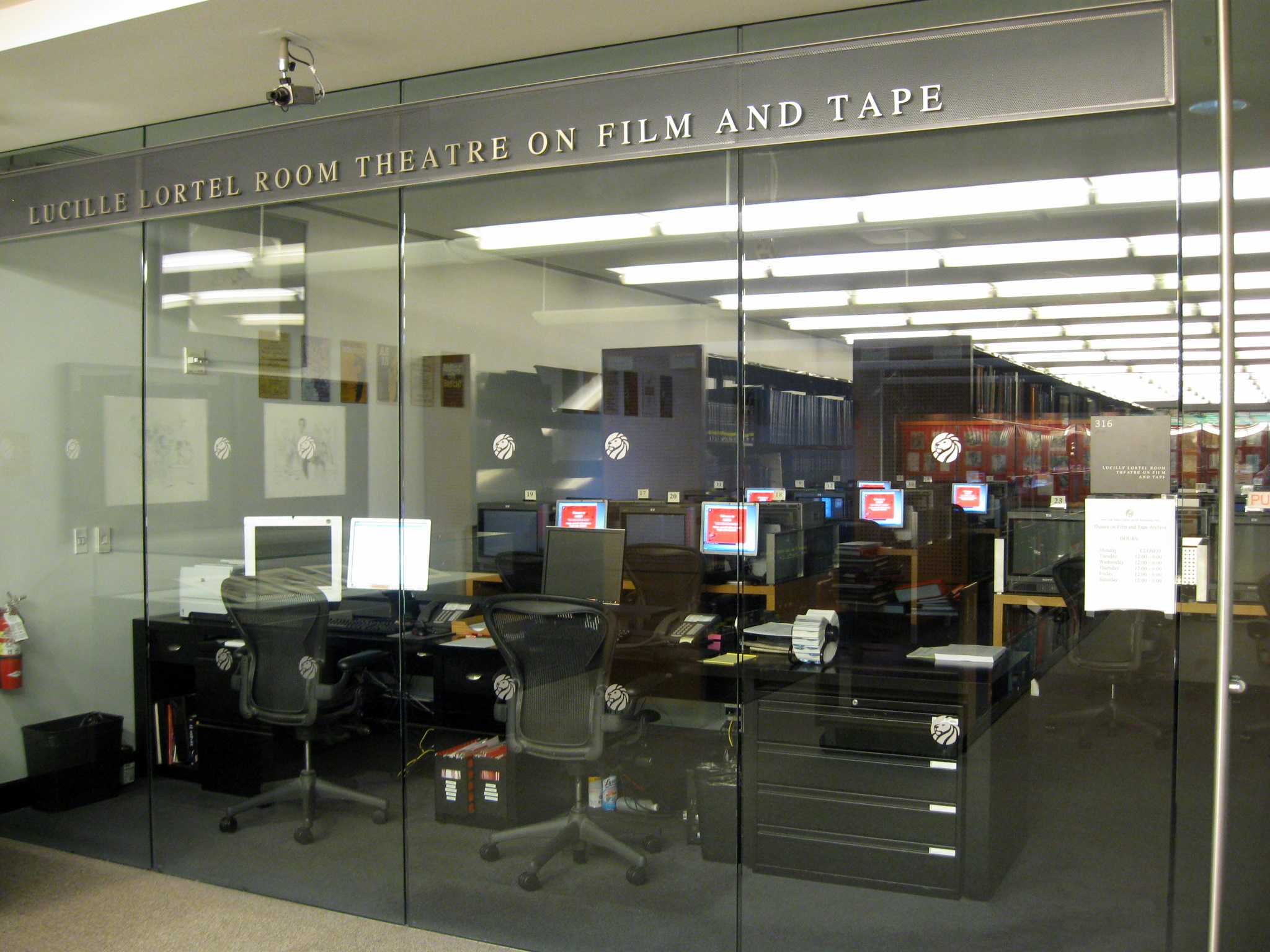
- The Theatre on Film and Tape room, dedicated to donor Lucille Lortel
- 40.77288°N 73.98413°W
- Location: New York City, United States
- Type: Specialized research library
- Scope: Theater and performing arts
- Established: 1970

Collection
- Items collected: Video recordings of theater productions
- Size: 7,901 titles (2016)

Other information
- Parent organization: New York Public Library for the Performing Arts
- Affiliation: Billy Rose Theatre Division
- Website: www.nypl.org/about/divisions/theatre-film-and-tape-archive

The Theatre on Film and Tape Archive (TOFT), a collection within the Billy Rose Theatre Division of the New York Public Library for the Performing Arts, produces video recordings of New York and regional theater productions, and provides research access at its Lucille Lortel screening room. The core of the collection consists of live recordings of Broadway and Off-Broadway productions, with some additional productions from professional regional theaters. The archive also records interviews and dialogues with notable theater professionals.

== History ==
The archive was established in 1970 by Betty L. Corwin, who served as its director until her retirement in 2000. Ms. Corwin and the archive were subsequently awarded a Special Tony Award for "Excellence in the Theatre" at the 55th Annual Tony Awards. In 2001, Patrick Hoffman became TOFT director.

== Access and location ==
The collection maintains contracts with all theatrical unions and guilds, thus enabling clearances for the non-commercial videotaping of live theater. The collection is housed on the 3rd floor of the New York Public Library for the Performing Arts. The recordings may be viewed by anyone with a professional or research interest, but may not be reproduced. Users consist of theater professionals, students, scholars, journalists, critics, and other researchers. The majority of the collection is cataloged online and searchable by visiting the NYPL website.

The collection is considered one of the most comprehensive collections of videotaped theater productions in the world. Archives modeled on TOFT include the Museum of Performance & Design in San Francisco, the Washington Area Performing Arts Video Archive established in Washington, D.C., and the National Video Archive of Performance in London.

== Collection ==
The collection includes many Tony Award-winning productions. Each production is normally recorded only once, although exceptions are sometimes made for significant cast changes. An attempt is made to collect artistically significant theater. The first play recorded by TOFT was Golden Bat, a 1970 Off-Broadway Japanese rock musical.

Among the highlights of the collection are:

- 1952 London production of South Pacific with Mary Martin
- 1975 production of Equus starring Anthony Hopkins
- Fiddler on the Roof with Zero Mostel
- Hello, Dolly! with Carol Channing (1994 revival)
- Original production of A Chorus Line at The Public Theater
- The Taming of the Shrew with Meryl Streep and Raúl Juliá
- Original production of Rent at New York Theatre Workshop
- 1998 Broadway revival of Cabaret, starring Natasha Richardson and Alan Cumming
- 2005 Broadway production of Glengarry Glen Ross, starring Liev Schreiber

== Production and preservation ==
Productions are recorded during a regular performance with an audience, are edited live, and are intended to represent as closely as possible a typical performance as seen in the theater. In addition to live performances, commercial recordings of theater-related films, documentaries, and television programs are also included in the collection. Currently between 50–60 live recordings are produced each year, covering most important productions. As of fall 2016, the collection included 7,901 titles. Original recordings were made on professional video formats spanning the past 40 years. Early analog recordings are transferred to digital formats as funding allows.

== Users ==
The collection is available to those with a professional, educational, or research reason to use the material. Theater professionals account for the largest group of users, including actors, dancers, directors, choreographers, designers, playwrights, producers, and stage managers. Students and faculty come from high schools, colleges, and professional schools in the area and beyond. In 2013, there were 8,079 individual users. Though the majority are from the New York area, they represented 45 U.S. states and 32 foreign countries.

Upon recording Side Show, the musical's co-creators Bill Russell and Henry Krieger said:

What the Lincoln Center Library for the Performing Arts does for our community is take something fleeting and ephemeral and make it immortal. We are so gratified that they are recording this production, and we hope that it gives audiences the chance to enjoy it for years to come.

== Funding ==
TOFT is funded in part by specially established endowments, and grants from foundations and government agencies, particularly the New York State Council on the Arts and the National Endowment for the Arts. In addition, the producers of a show sometimes pay the costs of having their production included in the collection.
