= National Video Archive of Performance =

Stage performance archive in London

The National Video Archive of Performance is a film and video archive in London, England which holds recordings of stage performances.

In 1992 the Theatre Museum, a branch museum of the Victoria & Albert Museum, began recording stage performance in the United Kingdom. The project was named the National Video Archive of Stage Performance and later renamed the National Video Archive of Performance. The model for the project was the Theatre on Film and Tape Archive at the New York Public Library at the Lincoln Center. The first production recorded was the Royal National Theatre production of Richard III starring Ian McKellen and directed by Richard Eyre.

The National Video Archive of Performance (NVAP) was the outcome of an agreement between the Federation of Entertainment Unions and the V&A Theatre Collections enabling the museum to make high quality archival recordings of live performance without payment of artists' fees.
