= Amira Abdelrasoul =

Canadian researcher and professor

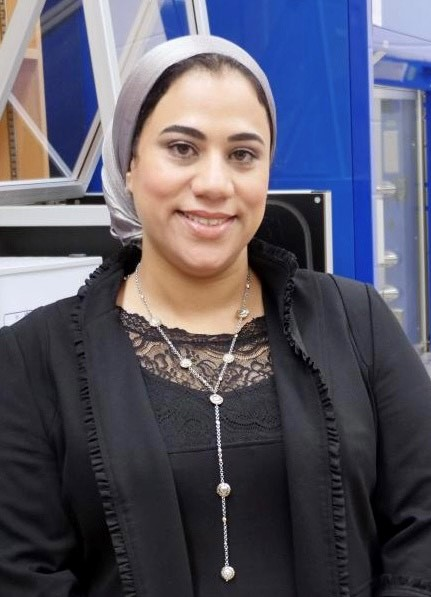
- Education: Alexandria University (BS); Kuwait University (MS); Ryerson University (PhD)
- Scientific career
- Fields: Biological Engineering; Chemical Engineering
- Workplaces: University of Saskatchewan

Amira Abdelrasoul is a researcher and associate professor at the Department of Chemical and Biological Engineering at the University of Saskatchewan, where she is the principal investigator of the Hemodialysis Membrane Science and Nanotechnology Research Centre. She is also a membrane technology leader in Canada, and her interdisciplinary research program focuses on solving existing hemodialysis system problems.

== Early years and education ==
Originally from Alexandria, Amira Abdelrasoul received her Bachelor of Science in Chemical Engineering from Alexandria University, Egypt. She then completed a Master of Science from Kuwait University, Kuwait, and went on to receive her PhD from Ryerson University (currently Toronto Metropolitan University), Canada, where she completed postdoctoral research. She is also a licensed professional engineer at Professional Engineers of Ontario (PEO) and Association of Professional Engineers and Geoscientists of Saskatchewan (APEGS).

== Career ==
Abdelrasoul started her career as a research assistant at the American Engineering Consultants ARAMCO in 2000. She joined Kuwait Polyurethane Industry as a R&D polymer process engineer in 2002. Later, she served as a research and teaching assistant at the Department of Chemical Engineering at the College of Engineering and Petroleum, Kuwait, from 2005 to 2008. During this time, she joined Kuwait Institute for Scientific Research as a research assistant in 2006. In 2008, she started working as a product development engineer at J Composites Inc, Canada.

Abdelrasoul became a teaching assistant at Ryerson University in 2011 while simultaneously pursuing a PhD. In 2015, she got promoted to the position of lecturer at the Department of Chemical Engineering at Ryerson, where she was also a postdoctoral research associate.

In 2017, Abdelrasoul joined the University of Saskatchewan's chemical and biological engineering department as an assistant professor and was promoted to associate professor in July 2022. She is the principal investigator of the Hemodialysis Membrane Science and Nanotechnology Research Centre at the University of Saskatchewan.

In 2019, she was an early career investigator in the Canadian Institutes of Health Research (CIHR) Peer Review Committee for the Project Grant Competition. In 2020, Abdelrasoul co-chaired the Exploration Multidisciplinary Review Panel of New Frontiers in Research Fund (NFRF) of Social Sciences and Humanities Research Council.

Abdelrasoul is also an associate member of numerous educational and research institutes, including the Biomedical Engineering Division at University of Saskatchewan, Global Institute for Water Security at the University of Saskatchewan, Gwenna Moss Centre for Teaching and Learning at the University of Saskatchewan, Yeates School of Graduate Studies at the Toronto Metropolitan University, and the Kidney Health and Disease (M3K) Committee. In addition she is a member of M3K Organizing Committee for the second pan-Canadian Molecules and Mechanisms Mediating Kidney Health and Disease (M3K) Meeting in Montreal, Canada in 2023.

Since 2018, Abdelrasoul has been a part of the Membrane Technology Design Projects Client at the University of Toronto for Engineering Strategies and Practice Course (ESP) APS112 and APS113. She joined Scientific Reports as an editorial board member in 2022.

Abdelrasoul also achieved a teaching portfolio with a University Teaching Development Professional Program (UTDP) accredited by SEDA (Staff and Educational Development Association) in the United Kingdom. She is a licensed Instructional Skills and Educational Development Facilitator and a Fellow of the Staff and Educational Development Association (FSEDA).

She has launched the Women in Engineering (WIE) chapter in the Chemical and Biological Engineering Department at the University of Saskatchewan, and she has been the WIE chair since 2018 to support and lead WIE undergraduate and graduate students; to support equity, diversity, and inclusion; and to mentor female student to build skills and reach crucial milestones.

== Hemodialysis membrane research ==
At University of Saskatchewan, Abdelrasoul initiated and incepted the first hemodialysis membrane research program in Canada. Her interdisciplinary research program focuses on solving existing hemodialysis problems, decreasing morbidity and mortality rates of hemodialysis patients, increasing the quality of life of kidney failure patients, and decreasing the high costs to the healthcare system in Canada and beyond that are normally attributed to hemodialysis and its shortcomings. Abdelrasoul was on the top list of the first NFRF competition of 2018 exploration for her interdisciplinary, international, high-risk/high-reward and fast-breaking research funded by the Social Sciences and Humanities Research Council.

Abdelrasoul has pioneered the use of customized gold nanoparticles to label and track the movement of specific blood proteins through hemodialysis membranes, which has proven to be a significant advance towards achieving more biocompatible dialysis membranes. The work she has done has led to groundbreaking advances in hemodialysis membrane science and technology. For example, one recent study was the first to be able to predict the inflammation that patients may experience after a dialysis session. With the new information she has gathered through her work at CLS, she is now able to create new designs and membrane materials to be tested in dialysis applications. Abdelrasoul's research program progress was featured in The Conversation Canada in April 2022. She has been interviewed by CTV Your Morning and CTV News. In 2022, she was invited to deliver a lecture on the life/ nephrology campus in Germany.

She is an active member of the Saskatchewan Centre for Patient-Oriented Research (SCPOR). She is working with dialysis patients and conducting targeted knowledge mobilization initiatives to facilitate sharing of the findings of her research program in non-academic mediums and with stakeholders. This work is partially funded by the Saskatchewan Health Research Foundation (SHRF) to further develop research directions toward patient outcomes.

Her team was the first in Canada to conduct in-depth studies of the chemical and physical characteristics of hemodialysis membranes used in Canadian hospitals. Her team also worked on modeling membrane characteristics and clinical practices to predict inflammation in dialysis patients. This work is now expanding to consider how different membranes and practices affect patients of different sexes, genders, and races, and with different medical histories. Abdelrasoul is working on synthesizing new and improved hemodialysis membranes. This direction will lead to new membranes that are more compatible with patient blood, and thus will enhance their quality of life and address a critical health and economic problem in Canada.

Her team has developed a theoretical model using computer simulations of molecule interactions to gain insight the interaction between blood proteins and the HD membranes currently used in hospitals. Abdelrasoul's recent work at the CLS has led to groundbreaking advances in HD membrane science and technology. For the first time, her research has directly linked the characteristics of the commercial membranes used in Canada to patient side effects.

== App for dialysis patients ==
Abdelrasoul worked with Push Interactions and funding from the Saskatchewan Health Research Foundation to develop an app through which dialysis patients can share their experiences.

== Publications ==
=== Articles ===
Abdelrasoul has authored and co-authored numerous research articles.

=== Books ===
She authored Biomimetic and Bioinspired Membranes for New Frontiers in Sustainable Water Treatment Technology Book (2017). She is also the editor of Advances in Membrane Technologies (2020).

== Honours and awards ==
Abdelrasoul received multiple academic excellence awards throughout her academic journey from Alexandria University, Kuwait University, and Ryerson University for her academic achievements. Abdelrasoul received the Governor General's Academic Gold Medal in 2015, the most prestigious academic award in Canada, for achieving the highest academic standing in her PhD degree program. She was also granted multiple scholarships due to her outstanding academic record, including Queen Elizabeth QEII GSST, Ryerson Graduate Scholarship, and Ontario Graduate Scholarship twice.

Abdelrasoul received the Best Poster Presentation Award at the Membrane Technology Conference, Orlando, USA, in 2015. She was a recipient of the Norman Esch Engineering Innovation and Entrepreneurship Award twice in 2015 and 2016 for pitching innovative membranes for engineering entrepreneurship startups. She was awarded C. Ravi Ravindran Outstanding Doctoral Thesis Award by Ryerson University in 2015 for her doctoral dissertation. This award recognizes the excellence of the doctoral dissertation from the points of originality, contribution to better understanding of the theory, philosophy, science, practice interrelationship, application of theory and impact on society, industry and environment.

In 2019, she was nominated for the Young Investigator Award by the Journal of Membranes and the Canadian Journal of Chemical Engineering Lectureship Award by the Canadian Society for Chemical Engineering (CSChE). Abdelrasoul was a recipient of the Good Fellow Faculty Travel Award from the University of Saskatchewan in 2019.

Later in 2021, she was nominated for Emerging Star in Chemical Engineering Research and Design Journal. She was also nominated for the Best Supervisor Award twice in 2021 and 2022 and received Best Clinical Paper Award at Life and Health Sciences Research Expo held at the University of Saskatchewan in 2021.

In 2021, Abdelrasoul received Dean's Remote Teaching recognition for her excellence in teaching in the College of Engineering at the University of Saskatchewan. She was named an Outstanding Women Researcher in Chemical Engineering by the Journal of Chemical Engineering Research and Design in 2022. She has also received the Young Investigator Excellence Award by the Canadian Light Source (CLS) Synchrotron, 2022.
