= Leon Katz (physicist) =

Canadian physicist

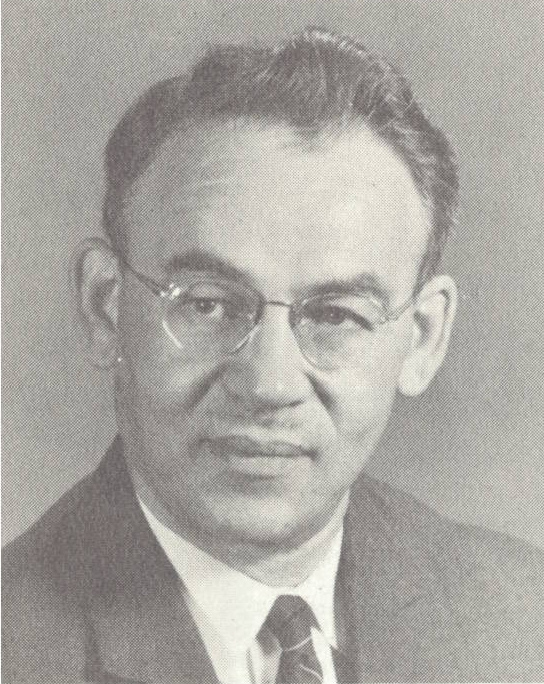
- Born: August 9, 1909; Lutsk, Russian Empire
- Died: March 1, 2004 (aged 94)
- Education: Queen's University; California Institute of Technology; University of Saskatchewan
- Awards: Fellow Royal Society of Canada (1952); Fellow American Physical Society (1966); Officer of the Order of Canada (1974)
- Scientific career
- Fields: Physics
- Workplaces: University of Saskatchewan; Westinghouse

Leon Katz, OC FRSC (August 9, 1909 – March 1, 2004) was a Canadian physicist.

== Biography ==
Born in Lutsk (then part of the Russian Empire; after World War I part of Poland), Katz emigrated to Canada in 1920 and was reunited with his father, who emigrated in 1914. During these early years he studied at Toronto Central Technical School to become an electrician; however, through an exchange program with Queens University he was able to transfer into a science program working part-time to afford tuition.

Katz completed his undergraduate and MSc degrees at Queen's University, and received a PhD from the California Institute of Technology. He specialized in accelerator physics, RF systems and, in later life, chaos theory. After working for Westinghouse Electric Company on radar equipment for aircraft, in Pittsburgh, in 1946 he moved to Saskatoon to become an associate professor at the University of Saskatchewan. In collaboration with Drs. Haslam and Jones he was part of the team that was successful in bringing a betatron to the University of Saskatchewan, that was used as the first radiation therapy facility in the province and also for research. He was the founding director of the Saskatchewan Accelerator Laboratory from 1964 to 1975 that eventually led to the formation of the Canadian Light Source.

== Honours ==
Katz also served or was honored as:

- Fellow of the Royal Society of Canada (1952)
- Fellow of the American Physical Society (1966)
- Member of Science Council of Canada (1966–72)
- President of the Canadian Association of Physicists (1973–74)
- Appointed Officer of the Order of Canada (1974)
- Member of the Council of Trustees of the Institute for Research on Public Policy (1974–86)
- Director of the Science Secretariat of the Government of Saskatchewan (1975–80)
- Honorary Degree University of Saskatchewan (1990)
- Prime of Life Achievement Award, University of Saskatchewan Retirees Association
- Rotary Golden Wheel Award for Excellence (2000)
