= Canadian Synchrotron Radiation Facility =

Synchrotron facility in Madison, Wisconsin, US

- Established: 1982
- Research type: Synchrotron light source
- Director: Mike Bancroft; T. K. Sham
- Staff: 3
- Location: Madison, Wisconsin
- Operating agency: National Research Council

The Canadian Synchrotron Radiation Facility (CSRF) (French: Institut canadien du rayonnement synchrotron – ICRS) was Canada's national synchrotron facility from 1983 to 2005. Eventually consisting of three beamlines at the Synchrotron Radiation Center at the University of Wisconsin–Madison, US, it served the Canadian synchrotron community until the opening of the Canadian Light Source in Saskatoon, Saskatchewan, finally ceasing operations in 2008.

== Beginnings ==
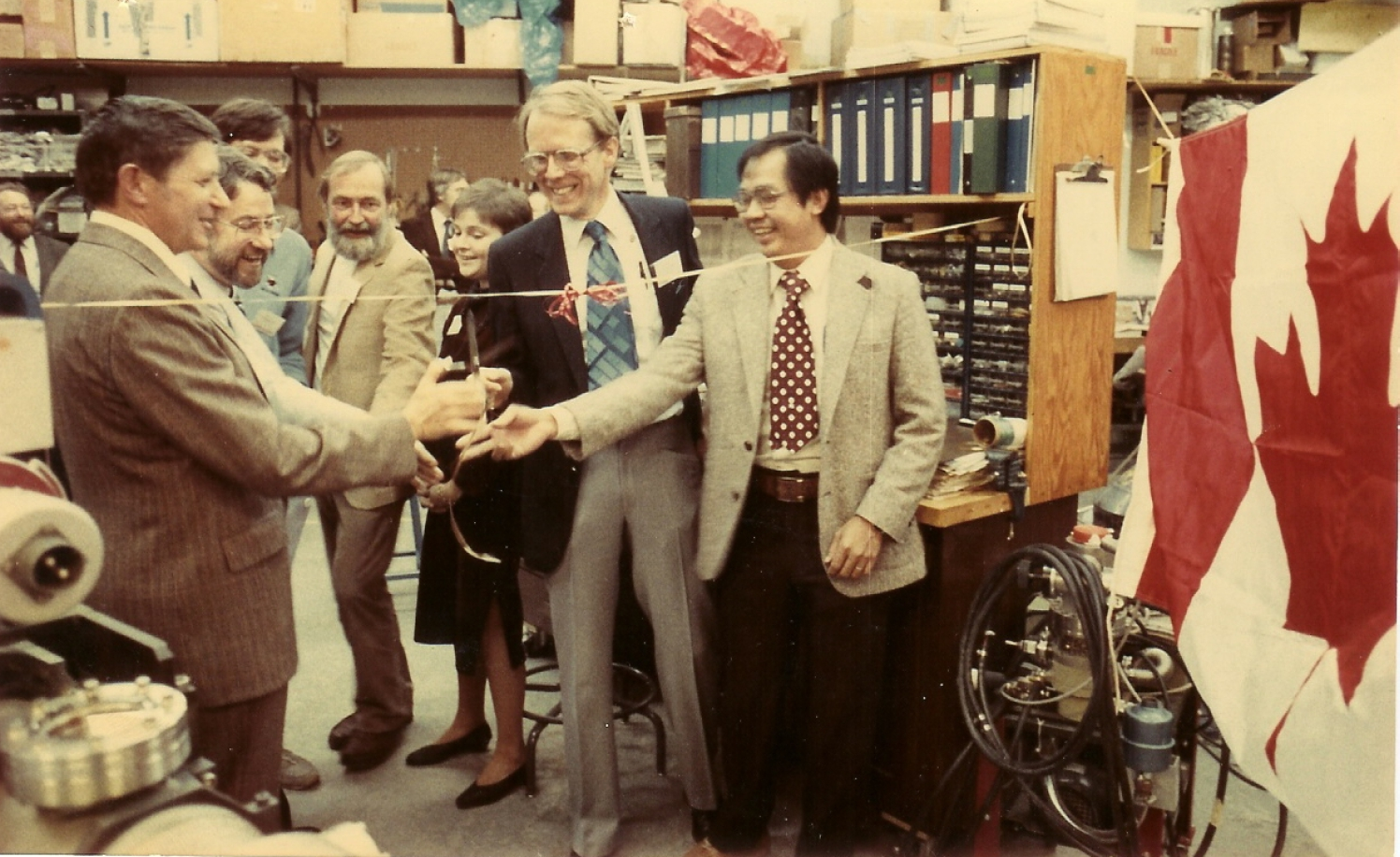
Opening ceremony for CSRF at SRC, October 1983. L to R: Norman Sherman, Bill McGowan, Brian Yates (UWO), Ed Rowe, Brenda Addison (UWO), Mike Bancroft, Kim Tan

In 1972 Mike Bancroft, a chemistry professor at the University of Western Ontario (UWO) took part in a workshop organised by Bill McGowan on the uses of synchrotron radiation. At the time there were no synchrotron users in Canada, but as a result of contact established with then-director Ed Rowe at the meeting, he began work at the Synchrotron Radiation Center (SRC) in Madison, Wisconsin, in 1975.

After several failed attempts were made to establish a synchrotron facility in Canada, Bancroft submitted a proposal to the National Research Council (NRC) to build a Canadian beamline on the existing Tantalus synchrotron at SRC. Rowe had offered Bancroft 100% use of the beamline at no charge in perpetuity – Bancroft recalled that Rowe "had a soft spot for Canadians, he had some relatives from Canada, so he was extremely helpful". In 1978 the newly created NSERC awarded capital funding. This was not sufficient, and further funding was obtained from the UWO Academic Development Fund and NSERC the following year to complete two endstations. Bancoft would later say "We hoped to get more beamlines so we called it the Canadian Synchrotron Radiation Facility (CSRF)". Bancroft was appointed Scientific Director, with Norman Sherman of NRC, who were to own and manage the facility, as manager. Operating money was initially provided by UWO, and Kim Tan was hired as the CSRF operations manager, to be based in Madison.

== 1978–1988: Grasshopper beamline ==
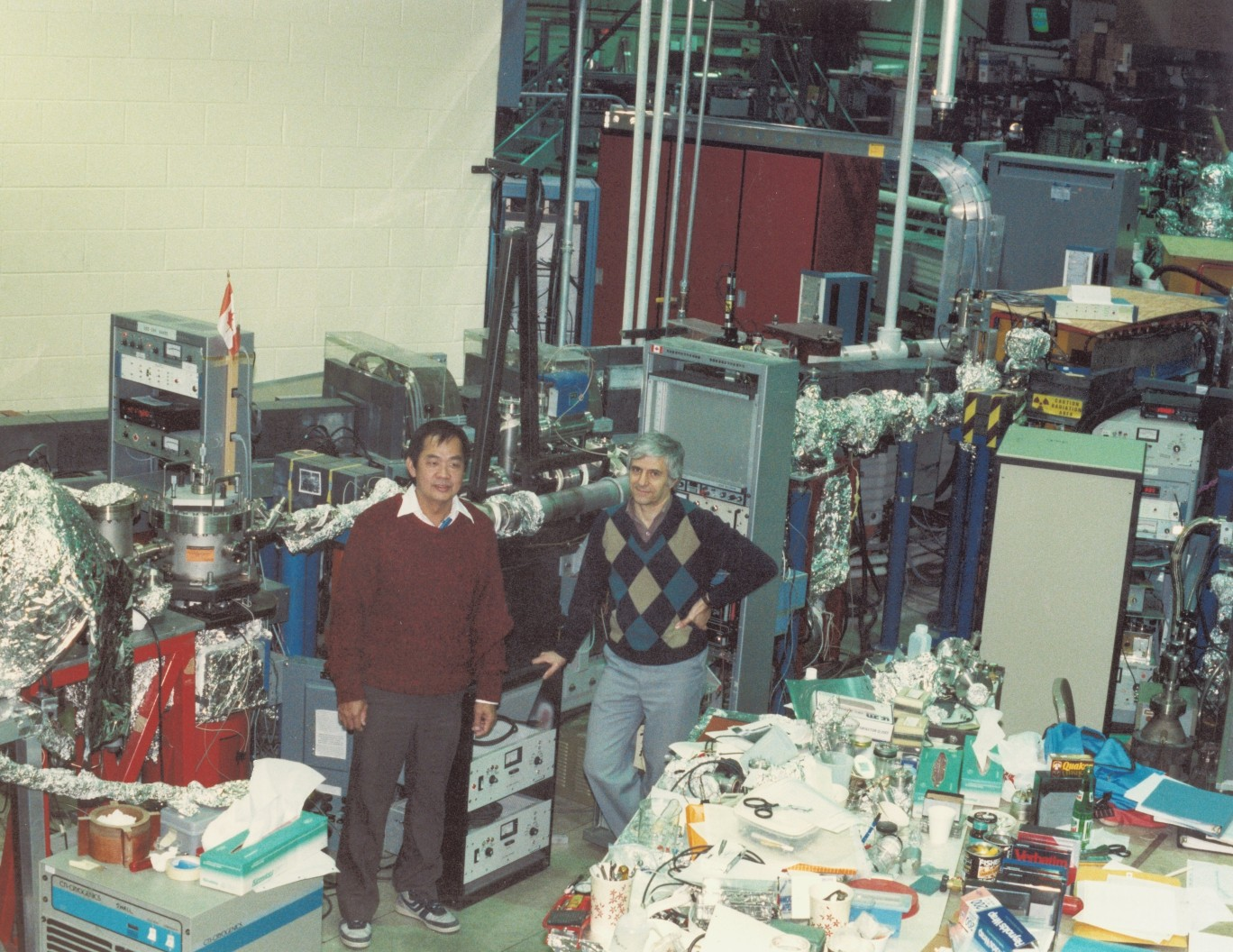
Kim Tan (L) and Masoud Kasrai UWO, (R) with the Grasshopper beamline on the Aladdin ring, late 1980s

A Grasshopper-type monochromator – so-called as its mechanical drive arm resembled a grasshopper's hind legs – was ordered from Baker Engineering. This type of monochromator had been specifically designed for use with synchrotron radiation, and had proven easy to use, rugged and dependable at the existing SRC ring, Tantalus, and at the Stanford Synchrotron Radiation Laboratory. The beamline was installed within a year, and by late 1981 initial results showed the performance to be state of the art over the 50–500eV photon energy range.

Notable early work included X-ray microscopy on biological samples, and gas-phase spectroscopy with a very influential series of papers on noble gases. In the mid-1980s the number of publications steadily increased, as did operating funding through NRC and NSERC.

SRC was building a new synchrotron, Aladdin, and again Rowe offered CSRF 100% use of their beamline at no change in perpetuity on the new machine. Aladdin was seriously delayed, to the point where its funding was cut and future seemed highly uncertain. With the new machine's performance improving, the decision was made to transfer the beamline to Aladdin in January 1986, some months before Aladdin's funding was restored. Bancroft later commented: "We were I think, the first beamline to transfer over, maybe we took a little bit of a risk because Aladdin's performance wasn't completely confirmed".

On Aladdin, with the higher X-ray intensity, new areas of science were opened up and the number of users increased mostly focused on X-ray absorption and photoemission spectroscopy of gases and solids. A photoemission spectrometer was donated by Ron Cavell of the University of Alberta and modified for high resolution gas-phase work.

== 1988–1998: DCM beamline ==
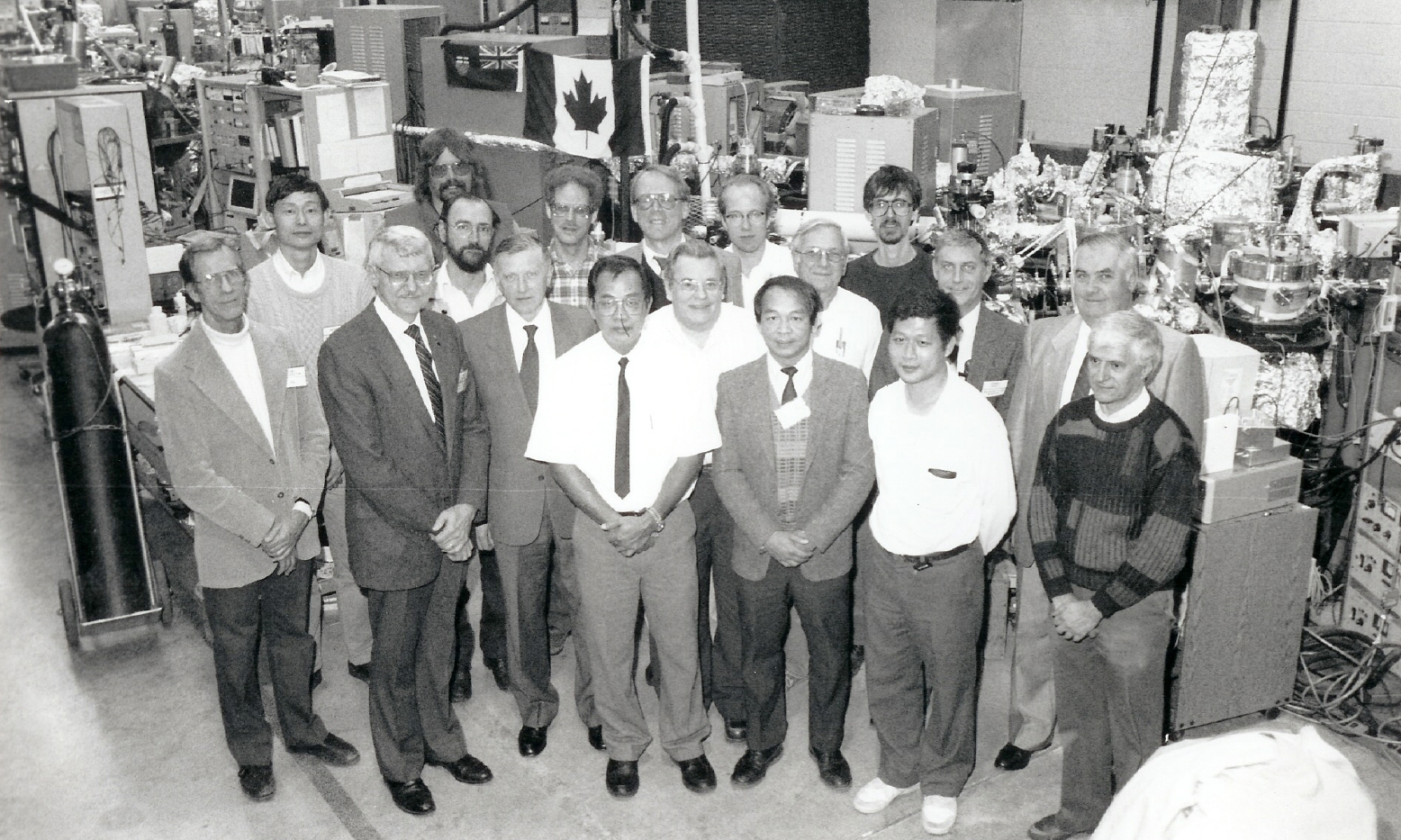
Opening ceremony for the DCM beamline, 1990

The X-ray intensity from Aladdin was much higher than on Tantalus, especially in the photon energy range up to 4000eV. These higher energies were potentially available using higher energy monochromators than the Grasshopper. In 1987, with Bancroft now chair of the Chemistry department at UWO he planned for a new beamline to cover the 1500-400eV energy range. A successful application was made to the recently formed Ontario Centre for Materials Research, and T.K. Sham was hired away from Brookhaven National Laboratory to design the beamline. A double crystal monochromator (DCM) was selected, to be built by the Madison Physical Sciences Laboratory, using a cylindrical mirror with a novel bending mechanism to focus the X-ray beam after the monochromator. B.X. Yang, also from Brookhaven, was hired in 1988 to construct the beamline. The beamline was built in less than 18 months, and was officially opened in 1990. The CSRF DCM beamline was regarded as particularly notable by SRC as it was the only beamline at the facility to reach energies higher than 1500 eV. With two beamlines, use by the Canadian community increased, with more than 40 scientists from 10 Canadian institutions using the facility from 1990 to 1992. Funding was now stable and adequate, with no charges to users.

== 1998–2008: SGM beamline ==
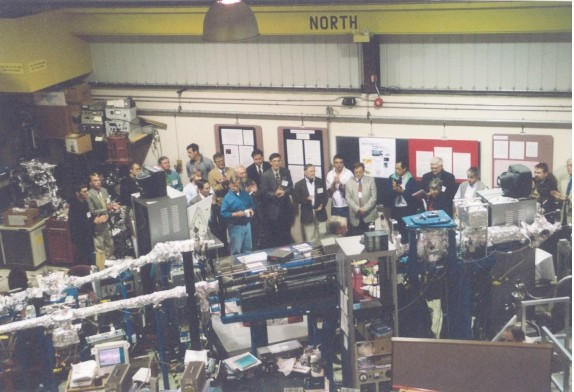
The SGM beamline seen on the day of its official opening, 1999

The energy range from 300 to 1500 eV was still unavailable at CSRF, so in 1992 Bancroft applied to NSERC for a third beamline. Funding was obtained in 1994 and Brian Yates, who had been Bancroft's first synchrotron PhD student, was hired to construct the beamline. The design chosen was a so-called Dragon-type spherical grating monochromator, with a single grating covering the range 240–700 eV, designed and manufactured by MacPherson Inc. The beamline was somewhat delayed, but was operational for users in 1998. Adam Hitchcock of McMaster University donated a photoemission spectrometer for coincidence measurements.

For the last 10 years of its existence CSRF was managed by Walter Davidson of NRC, with T.K. Sham (UWO) as Scientific Director. In 2004 the SGM beamline was decommissioned and taken to Canada for use on the new Canadian facility, while the remaining two beamlines, 30 and 15 years old, were still working well in 2007.

== The Canadian Light Source and the end of CSRF ==
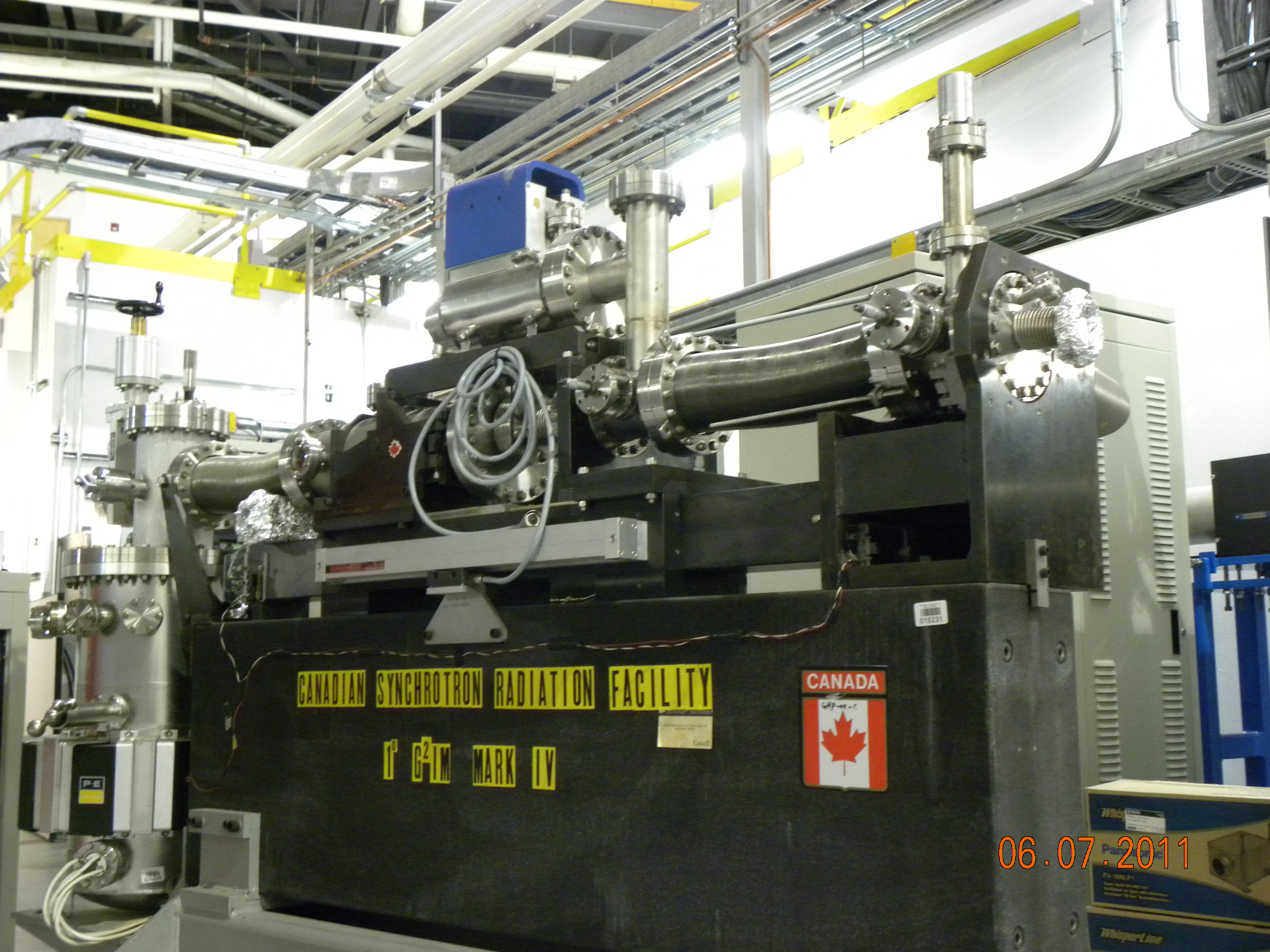
The Grasshopper monochromator, now a museum piece at the CLS

Following a prolonged campaign by the Canadian synchrotron user community, the decision was made in 1999 to build a Canadian synchrotron in Saskatoon, Saskatchewan: the Canadian Light Source (CLS). A proposal was made by the CSRF user community to take all three CSRF beamlines to the CLS and install them on the newer synchrotron. However the CLS' Facility Advisory Committee recommended that only the SGM beamline be re-used, with newer replacements constructed for the other two beamlines. In the event, only the monochromator and exit slit mechanism of the SGM beamline were taken to Canada and re-used, with some modifications, in the beamline of the same name at the CLS. The Grasshopper monochromator was also taken to the CLS, where it is now a museum piece, while the DCM beamline was left at SRC where it continues in use. At the CLS the VLS-PGM and SXRMB beamlines, respectively were built to replace those two beamlines.

CSRF formally ceased operations on March 31, 2008. Several ex-CSRF personnel, including Kim Tan, moved to the CLS, and the Saskatoon laboratory employed many former CSRF users. Emil Hallin, then of the Saskatchewan Accelerator Laboratory which designed the CLS, now its Director of Strategic Scientific Development, got his first experience of synchrotron beamlines at CSRF.
