= Canadian Light Source =

Synchrotron light source facility in Saskatoon, Canada

Coordinates: 52°08′12.5″N 106°37′52.5″W

- Established: 1999
- Research type: Synchrotron light source
- Director: Bill Matiko (CEO), Ingrid Pickering (Chief Science Officer), Kevin Wyatt (interim machine director)
- Staff: 250 (approx.)
- Location: Saskatoon, Saskatchewan
- Operating agency: Canadian Light Source Inc.
- Website: www.lightsource.ca

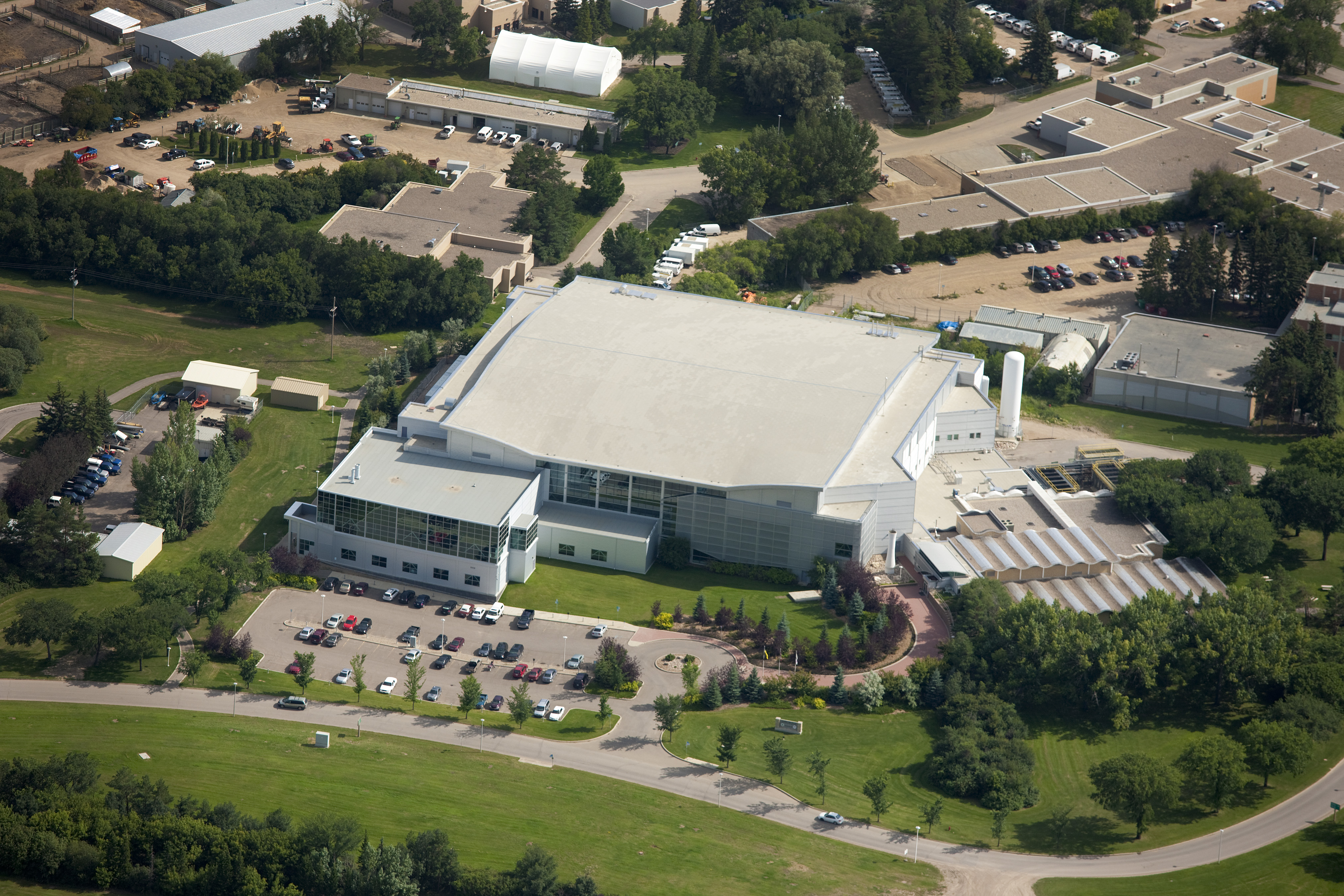
The Canadian Light Source building from the air

The Canadian Light Source (CLS) (French: Centre canadien de rayonnement synchrotron – CCRS) is Canada's national synchrotron light source facility, located on the grounds of the University of Saskatchewan in Saskatoon, Saskatchewan, Canada. The CLS has a third-generation 2.9 GeV storage ring, and the building occupies a footprint the size of a Canadian football field. It opened in 2004 after a 30-year campaign by the Canadian scientific community to establish a synchrotron radiation facility in Canada. It has expanded both its complement of beamlines and its building in two phases since opening. As a national synchrotron facility with over 1000 individual users, it hosts scientists from all regions of Canada and around 20 other countries. Research at the CLS has ranged from viruses to superconductors to dinosaurs, and it has also been noted for its industrial science and its high school education programs.

== History ==
=== The road to the CLS: 1972–1999 ===
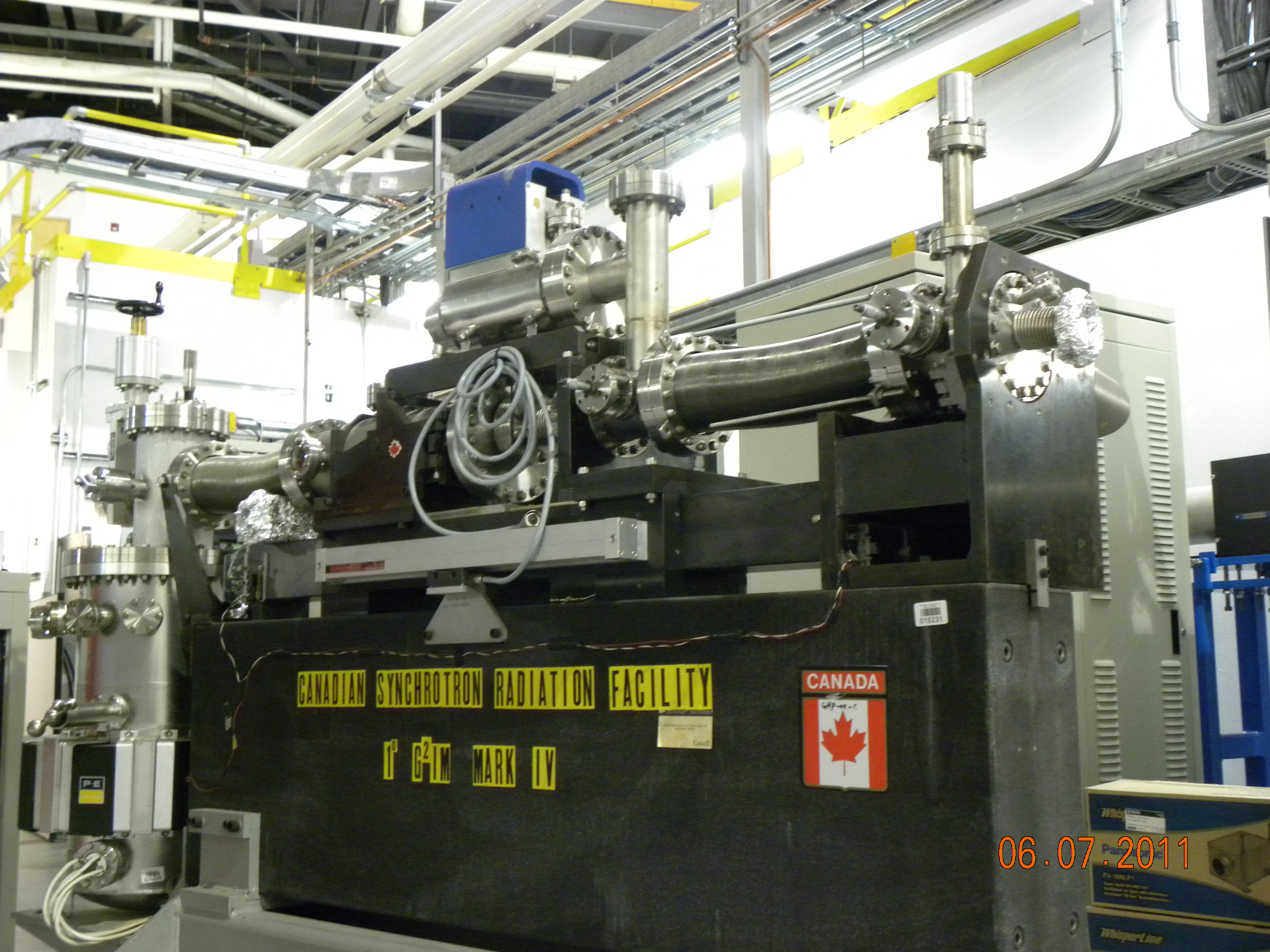
The monochromator from the first CSRF beamline, now a museum piece at the CLS

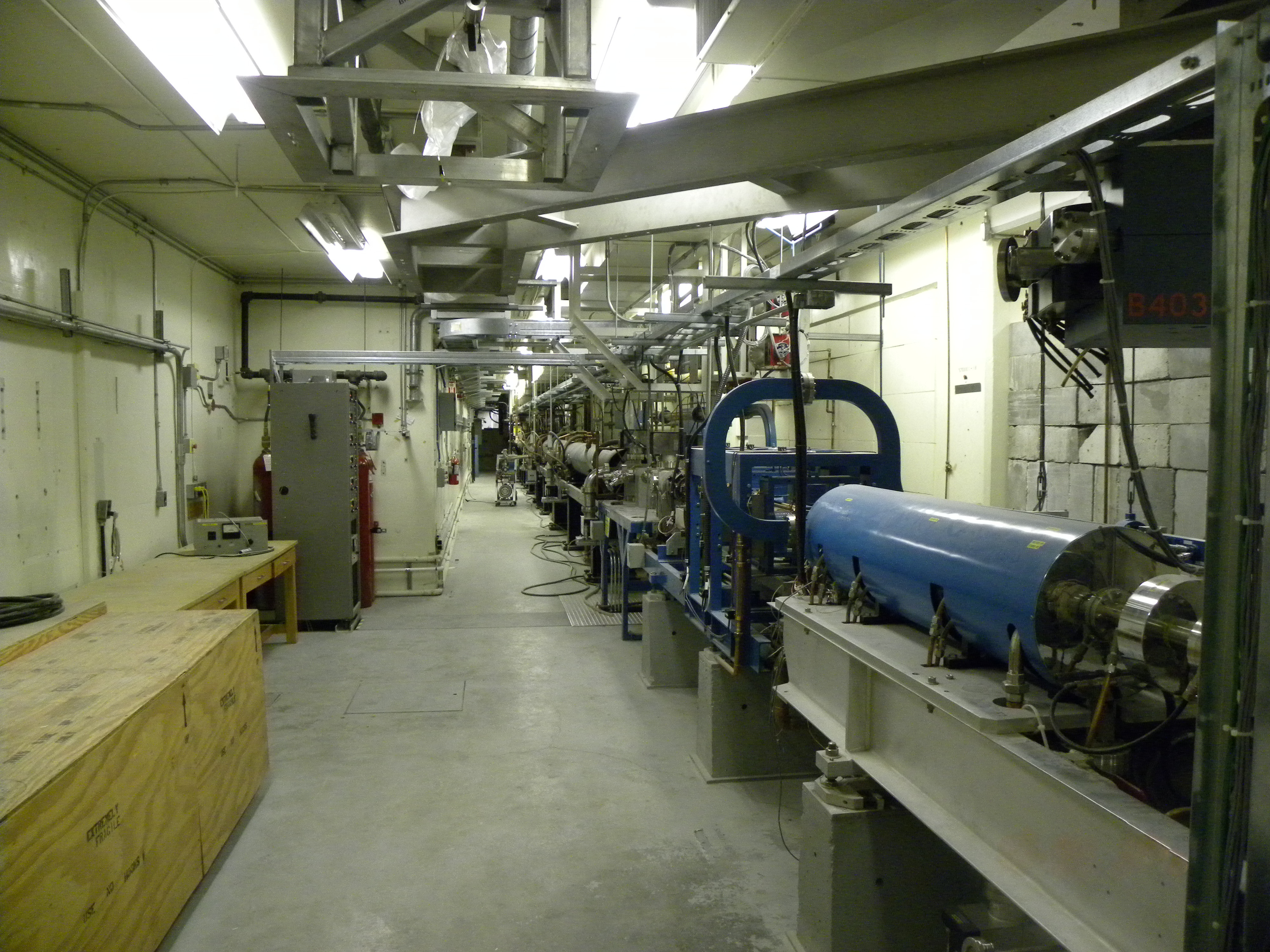
The SAL LINAC, seen at the CLS in 2011

Canadian interest in synchrotron radiation dates from 1972, when Bill McGowan of the University of Western Ontario (UWO) organised a workshop on its uses. At that time there were no users of synchrotron radiation in Canada. In 1973 McGowan submitted an unsuccessful proposal to the National Research Council (NRC) for a feasibility study on a possible synchrotron lightsource in Canada. In 1975 a proposal to build a dedicated synchrotron lightsource in Canada was submitted to NRC. This was also unsuccessful. In 1977 Mike Bancroft, also of UWO, submitted a proposal to NRC to build a Canadian beamline, as the Canadian Synchrotron Radiation Facility (CSRF), at the existing Synchrotron Radiation Center at the University of Wisconsin-Madison, USA, and in 1978 newly created NSERC awarded capital funding. CSRF, owned and operated by NRC, grew from the initial beamline to a total of three by 1998.

A further push towards a Canadian synchrotron light source started in 1990 with formation of the Canadian Institute for Synchrotron Radiation (CISR), initiated by Bruce Bigham of Atomic Energy of Canada Limited (AECL). AECL and TRIUMF showed interest in designing the ring, but the Saskatchewan Accelerator Laboratory (SAL) at the University of Saskatchewan became prominent in the design. In 1991 CISR submitted a proposal to NSERC for a final design study. This was turned down, but in later years, under President Peter Morand, NSERC became more supportive. In 1994 NSERC committee recommended a Canadian synchrotron light source and a further NSERC committee was formed to select between two bids to host such a facility, from the Universities of Saskatchewan and Western Ontario. In 1996 this committee recommended that the Canadian Light Source be built in Saskatchewan.

With NSERC unable to supply the required funds it was not clear where funding would come from. In 1997 the Canada Foundation for Innovation (CFI) was created to fund large scientific projects, possibly to provide a mechanism to fund the CLS. In 1998 a University of Saskatchewan team led by Dennis Skopik, the SAL director, submitted a proposal to CFI. The proposal was to fund 40% of the construction costs, with remaining money having to come from elsewhere. Assembling these required matching funds has been called "an unprecedented level of collaboration among governments, universities, and industry in Canada" and Bancroft – leader of the rival UWO bid – anckowledged the "Herculean" efforts of the Saskatchewan team in obtaining funds from the University, the City of Saskatoon, Saskatchewan Power, NRC, the Provincial Government of Saskatchewan, and Western Economic Diversification. At a late hour CFI told the proponents that it would not accept the SAL LINAC as part of the proposal, and the resulting shortfall was met in part by the spontaneous announcement by the Saskatoon city council and then Mayor Henry Dayday that they would double their contribution as long as other partners would. On 31 March 1999 the success of the CFI proposal was announced.

The following month Skopik took a position at Jefferson Lab in the USA. He decided not to stay on as director of the Saskatoon facility because his expertise was in subatomic particles, and, he argued, the head of the CLS should be a researcher who specializes in using such a facility. His successor was Mike Bancroft

=== Construction: 1999–2004 ===
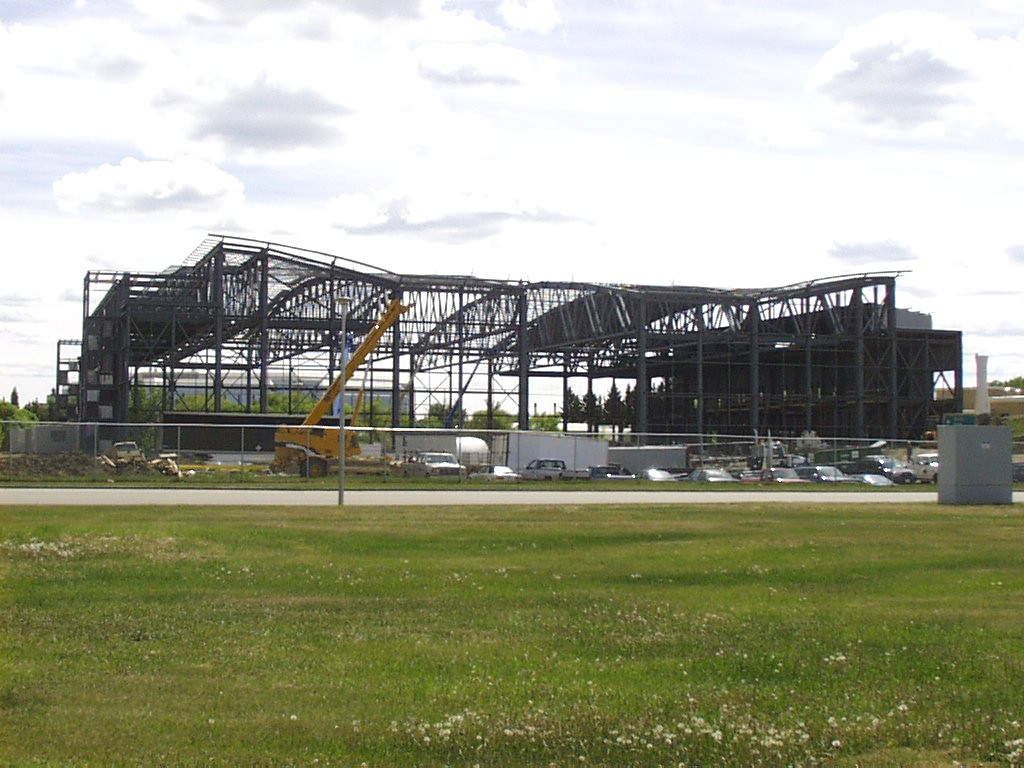
The CLS building under construction in June 2000

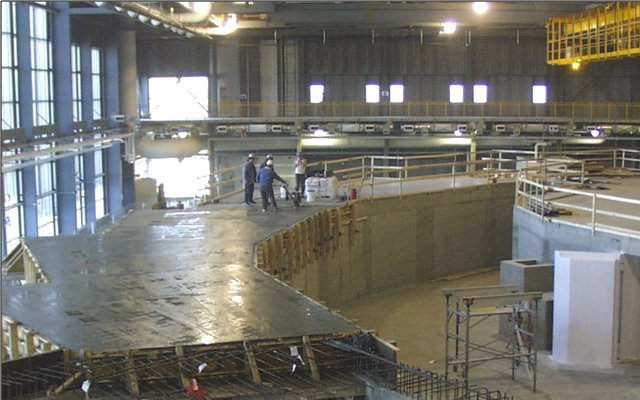
CLS ring tunnel construction under way in 2001

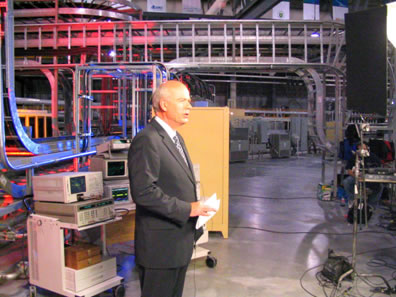
Peter Mansbridge opens The National on top of the storage ring, 21 October 2004

At the start of the project, all staff members with the former SAL were transferred into a new not-for-profit corporation, Canadian Light Source Inc., CLSI, which had primary responsibility for the technical design, construction and operation of the facility. As a separate corporation from the University, CLSI had the legal and organizational freedom suitable for this responsibility. UMA, an experienced engineering firm, now part of AECOM, with extensive experience managing large technical and civil construction projects, was hired as project managers.

The new building – attached to the existing SAL building, and measuring 84m by 83m in area with a maximum height of 23m – was completed in early 2001.

Bancroft's appointment ended in October 2001 and he returned to UWO, with Mark de Jong appointed acting director. Bancroft remained as acting Scientific Director until 2004.

The SAL LINAC was refurbished and placed back into service in 2002 while the booster and storage rings were still under construction. First turn was achieved in the booster ring in July 2002 with full booster commissioning completed by September 2002.

New director Bill Thomlinson, an expert in synchrotron medical imaging, arrived in November 2002. He was recruited from the European Synchrotron Radiation Facility where he had been the head of the medical research group.

The 1991 proposal to NSERC envisioned a 1.5 GeV storage ring, since at this time the interest of the user community was mainly in the soft X-ray range. The ring was a racetrack layout of four to six bend regions surrounding straights with extra quadrupoles to allow for variable functions in the straights. The design contemplated the use of superconducting bends in some locations to boost the photon energies produced. The drawback of this design was the limited number of straight sections. In 1994 a more conventional machine with 8 straight sections was proposed, again with 1.5 GeV energy. At this time more users of hard X-rays were interested and it was felt that both the energy and number of straight sections were too low. By the time funding was secured in 1999 the design had changed to 2.9 GeV, with longer straight sections to enable two insertion devices per straight, delivering beam to two independent beamlines.

Construction of the storage ring was completed in August 2003 and commissioning began the following month. Although beam could be stored, in March 2004 a large obstruction was found across the center of the chamber. Commissioning proceeded quickly after this was removed, and by June 2004 currents of 100mA could be achieved.

On 22 October 2004 the CLS officially opened, with an opening ceremony attended by federal and provincial dignitaries, including then-Federal Minister of Finance Ralph Goodale and then-Saskatchewan Premier Lorne Calvert, university presidents and leading scientists. October 2004 was declared "Synchrotron Month" by the city of Saskatoon and the Saskatchewan government. Peter Mansbridge broadcast the CBC's nightly newscast The National from the top of the storage ring the day before the official opening. In parliament local MP Lynne Yelich said "There were many challenges to overcome, but thanks to the vision, dedication and persistence of its supporters, the Canadian Light Source synchrotron is open for business in Saskatoon."

=== Operation and expansion: 2005–2012 ===
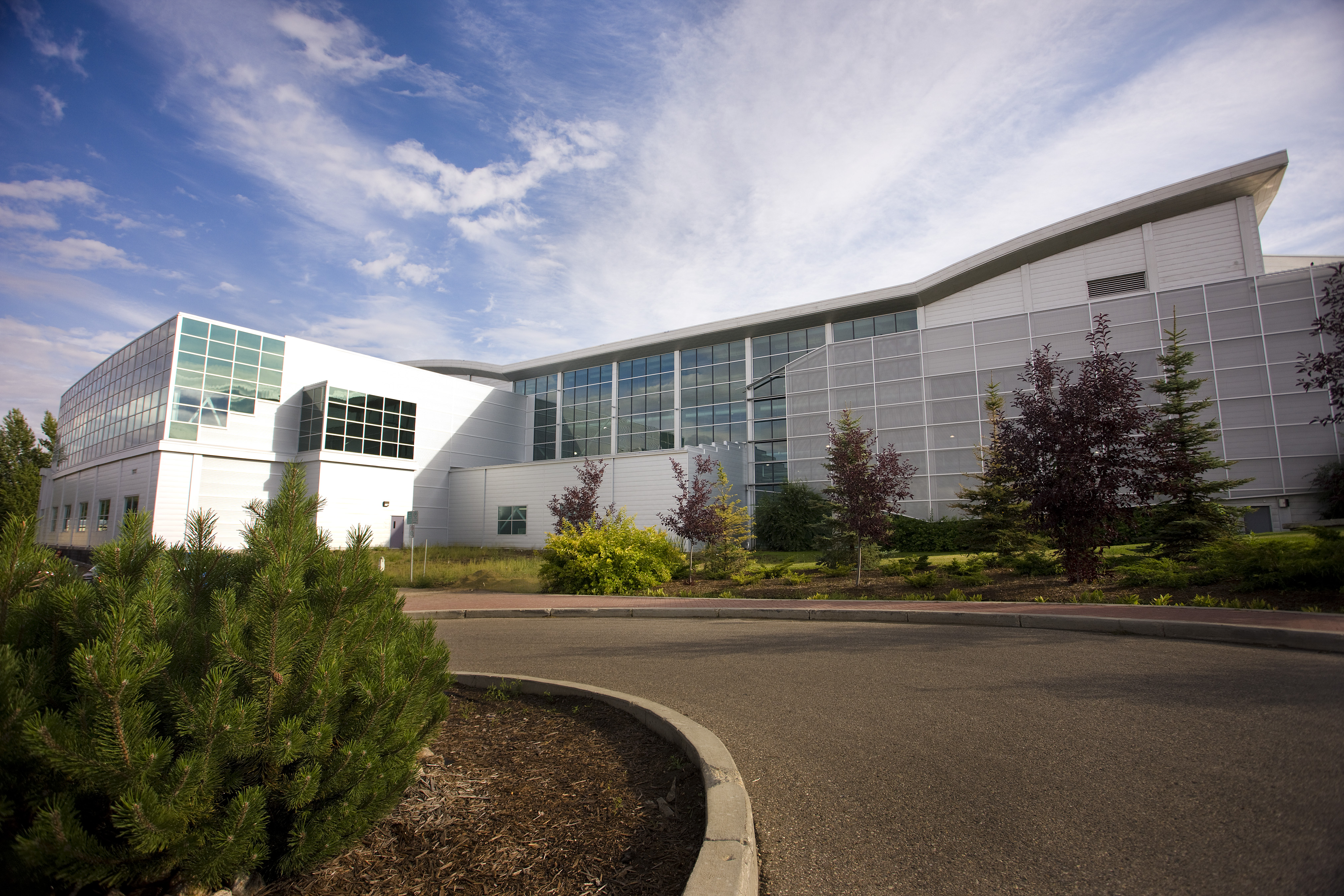
The CLS building in 2008, with the expansion for the BMIT beamline on the left

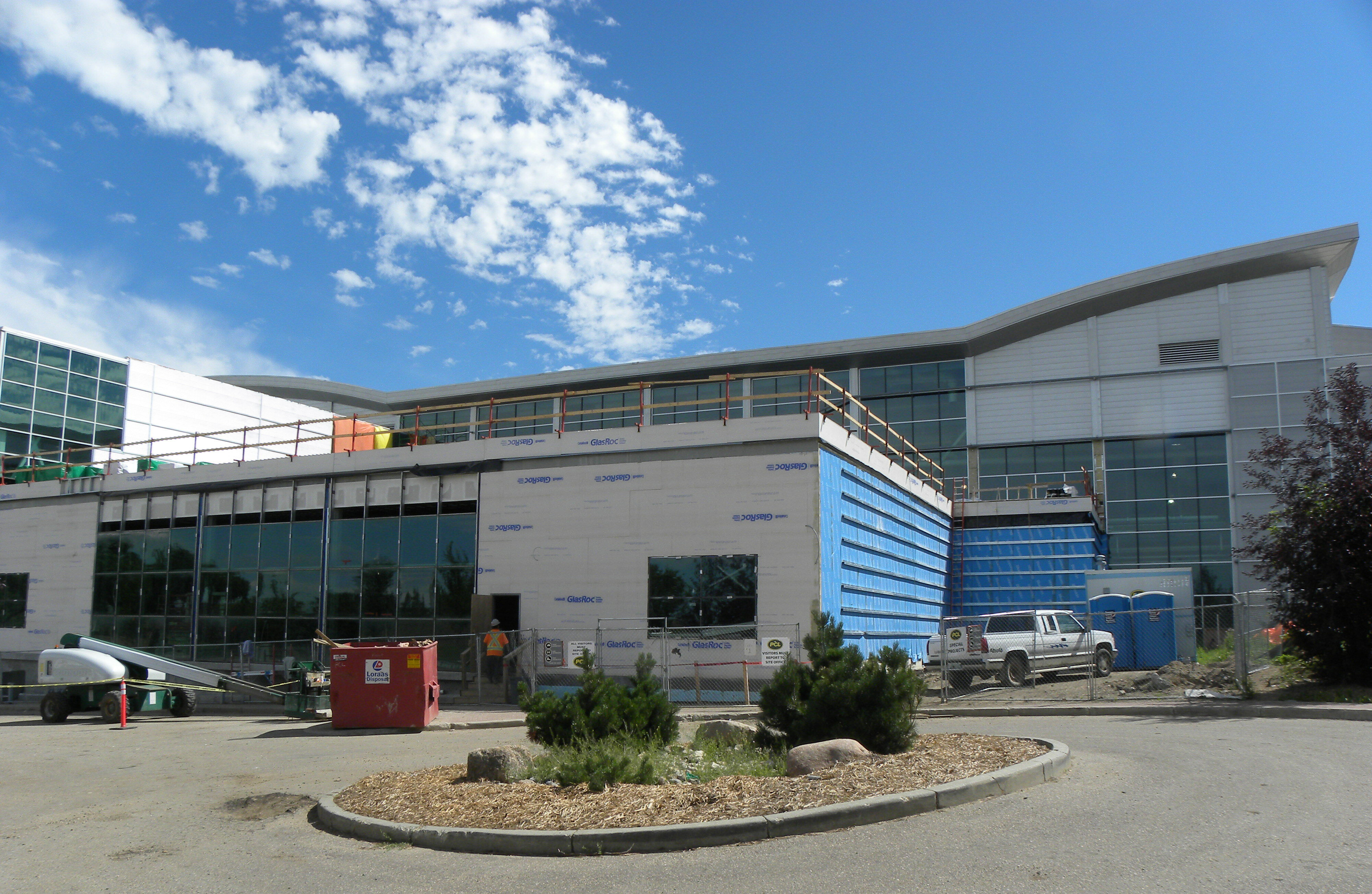
The expansion for the Brockhouse beamlines under construction in July 2012

The initial funding included seven beamlines, referred to as Phase I, which covered the full spectral range: two infrared beamlines, three soft X-ray beamlines and two hard X-ray beamlines. Further beamlines were built in two further phases, II (7 beamlines) and III (5 beamlines), announced in 2004 and 2006 respectively. Most of these were funded through applications to CFI by individual universities including UWO, the University of British Columbia and Guelph University

In March 2005 leading infrared researcher Tom Ellis joined the CLS from Acadia University as Director of Research. He had previously spent 16 years at the Université de Montréal.

The first external user was hosted in 2005, and the first research papers with results from the CLS were published in March 2006 – one from the University of Saskatchewan on peptides and the other from the University of Western Ontario on materials for organic light-emitting diodes. A committee was set up in 2006 to peer review proposals for beamtime, under the chairmanship of Adam Hitchcock of McMaster University. By 2007 more than 150 external users had used the CLS, and all seven of the initial beamlines had achieved significant results.

The CLS building was also expanded in two phases. A glass and steel expansion was completed in 2007 to house the phase II medical imaging beamline BMIT, and construction on the expansion needed to house the phase III Brockhouse beamline started in July 2011 and is still ongoing as of July 2012.

Bill Thomlinson retired in 2008, and in May of that year physics professor Josef Hormes of the University of Bonn, former director of the CAMD synchrotron at Louisiana State University was announced as the new director.

Science fiction author Robert J. Sawyer was writer-in-residence for two months in 2009 in what he called a "once in a lifetime opportunity to hang out with working scientists" While there he wrote most of the novel "Wonder", which won the 2012 Prix Aurora Award for best novel."

By the end of 2010 more than 1000 individual researchers had used the facility, and the number of publications had passed 500. From 2009–2012 several key metrics doubled, including the number of users and the number of publications, with more than 190 papers published in 2011. More than 400 proposals were received for beam time in 2012, with approximately a 50% oversubscription rate averaged over the operational beamlines. By 2012 the user community spanned all regions of Canada and around 20 other countries. That year a high school group from La Loche Saskatchewan became the first to use the purpose built educational beamline IDEAS. Also in 2012 the CLS signed an agreement with the Advanced Photon Source synchrotron in the USA to allow Canadian researchers access to their facilities.

== Science ==
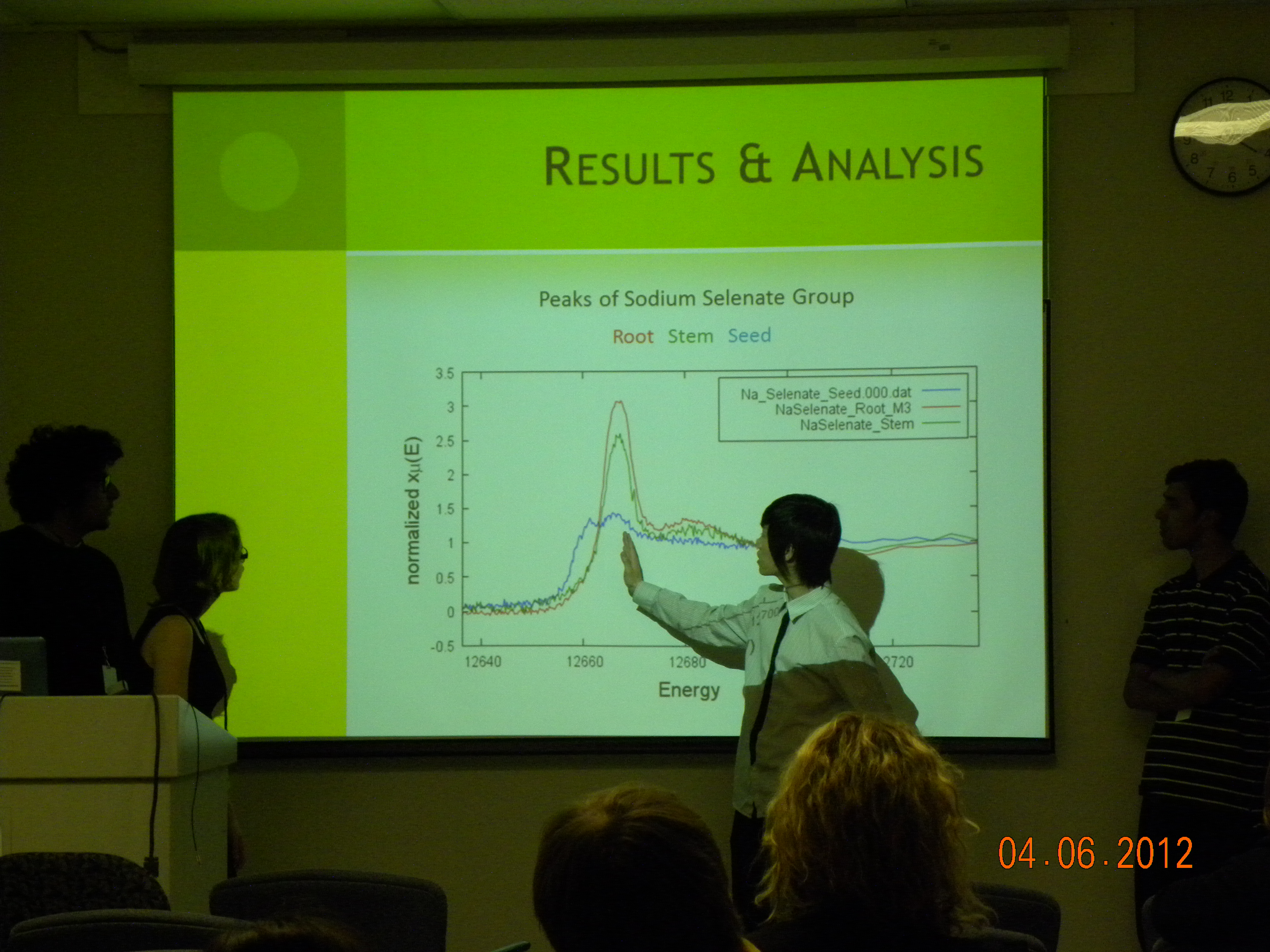
Students from Evan Hardy Collegiate presenting their data at a seminar at CLS

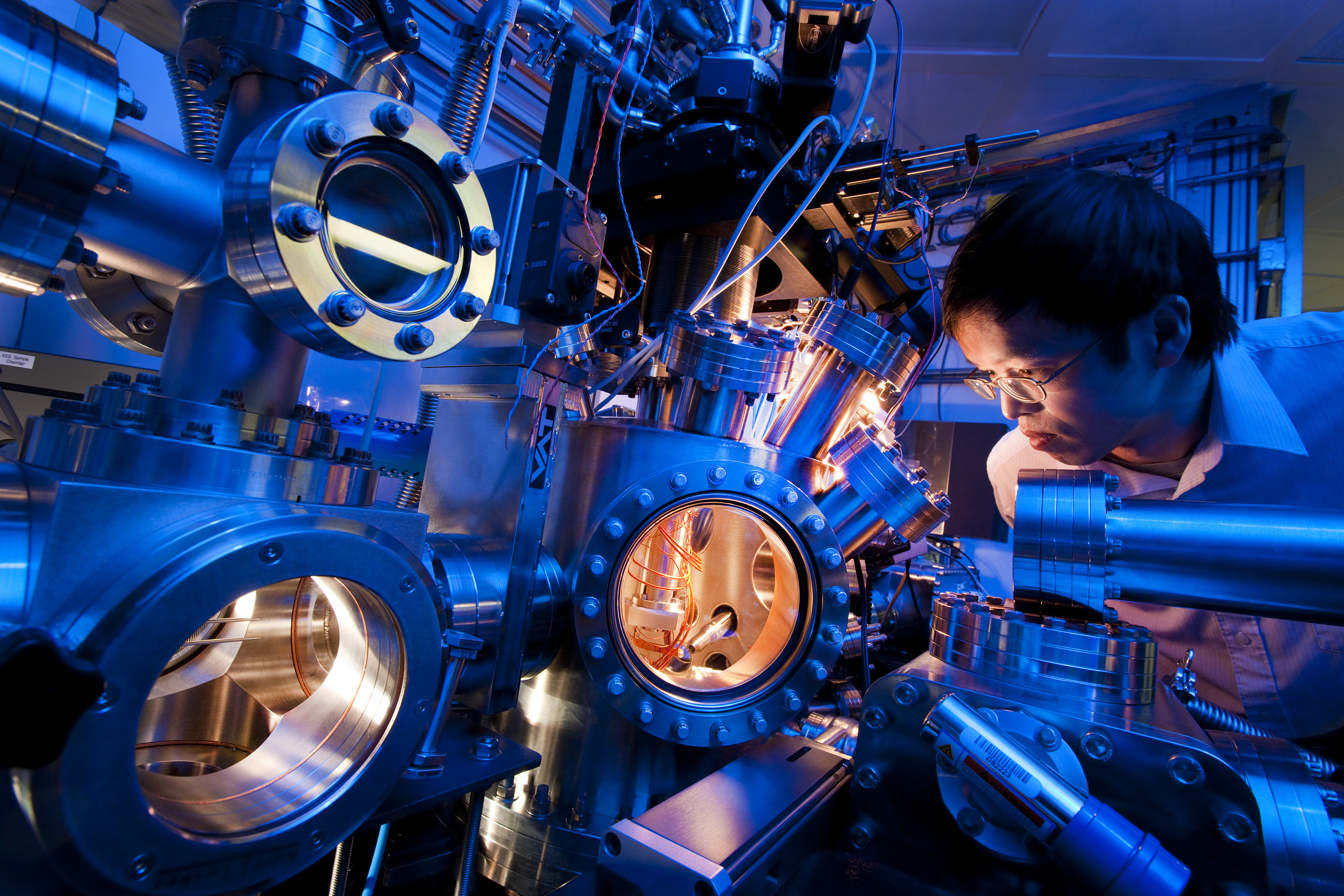
The REIXS beamline with CLS scientist Feizhou He

An international team led by University of Calgary professor Ken Ng solved the detailed structure of RNA polymerase using X-ray crystallography at the CLS. This enzyme replicates itself as the Norwalk virus spreads through the body, and has been linked to other superviruses such as hepatitis C, West Nile virus and the common cold. Its duplication is responsible for the onset of such viruses.

CLS scientist Luca Quaroni and University of Saskatchewan professor Alan Casson used infrared microscopy to identify biomarkers inside individual cells from tissue associated with Barrett's esophagus. This disease can lead to an aggressive form of cancer known as esophageal adenocarcinoma.

Researchers from Lakehead University and the University of Saskatchewan used the CLS to investigate the deaths of Royal Navy sailors buried in Antigua in the late 1700s. They used X-ray fluorescence to look for trace elements such as lead and strontium in bones from a recently excavated naval cemetery

Scientists from Stanford University worked with CLS scientists to design a cleaner, faster battery. The new battery charges in less than two minutes, thanks to a newly developed carbon nanostructure. The team grew nanocrystals of iron and nickel on carbon. Traditional batteries lack this structure, mixing iron and nickel with conductors more or less randomly. The result was a strong chemical bond between the materials, which the team identified and studied at the synchrotron.

A team led by the Politecnico di Milano, including scientists from the University of Waterloo and the University of British Columbia, found the first experimental evidence that a charge density wave instability competes with superconductivity in high-temperature superconductors. They used four synchrotrons including the REIXS beamline at CLS.

Using the X-ray spectromicroscopy beamline, a research team led by scientists from the State University of New York, Buffalo produced images of graphene showing how folds and ripples act as speed bumps for electrons, affecting its conductivity. This has implications for the use of graphene in a variety of future products.

A collaboration between the University of Regina and the Royal Saskatchewan Museum has been investigating dinosaur fossils at the CLS, including "Scotty," a Tyrannosaurus found in Saskatchewan in 1991, one of the most complete and largest T-rex skeletons ever found. They looked at the concentration of elements in bones to study the impact of the environment on such animals.

== Industrial program and economic impact ==
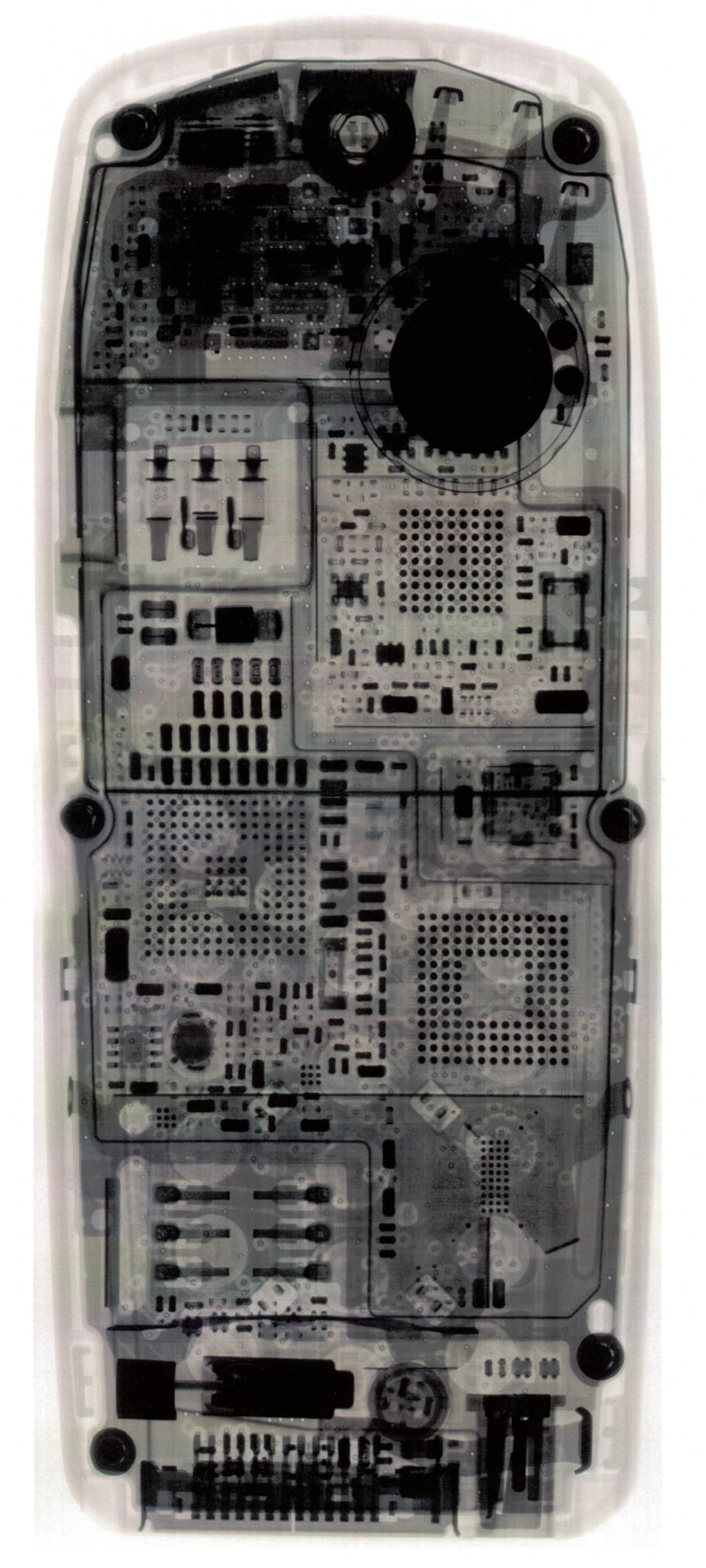
Image of a cellphone taken at CLS

From inception, the CLS showed a "strong commitment to industrial users and private/public partnerships", with then-director Bancroft reporting "more than 40 letters of support from industry indicating that [the CLS] is important for what they do". The CLS has an industrial group, within the larger experimental facilities division, with industrial liaison scientists who make synchrotron techniques available to a "non-traditional" user base who are not synchrotron experts. By 2007 more than 60 projects had been carried out, although in a speech in the same year, then-CLS director Bill Thomlinson said that "one of the biggest challenges for the synchrotron...is to get private users through the door", with less than 10% of time actually used by industry.

In 1999 then-Saskatoon mayor Dayday stated that "the CLS will add $122 million to Canada's GDP during construction and $12 million annually after that". An economic impact study of the two financial years 2009/10 and 10/11 showed the CLS had added $45 million per year to the Canadian GDP, or about $3 for every $1 of operating funding.

The CLS has stated that "the primary means of accessing the CLS is through a system of peer review, which ensures that the proposed science is of the highest quality and permits access to the facility to any interested researcher, regardless of regional, national, academic, industrial or governmental affiliation."

== Official visitors ==
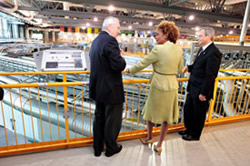
Michaëlle Jean (C) at the Canadian Light Source, with CLS Director Josef Hormes (L) and University of Saskatchewan President Peter MacKinnon (R)

Then-Prime Minister Jean Chrétien visited the CLS in November 2000 during an election campaign stop in Saskatoon. He gave a speech on the mezzanine level of the building following his tour of the facility, praising the project for helping to reverse the brain drain of scientists from Canada. In August 2010 then-Governor General Michaëlle Jean visited the CLS as part of a two-day tour of Saskatchewan. In April 2012 the CLS was "visited" remotely by Governor General David Johnston. He was visiting the LNLS synchrotron in Brazil, during a live link-up, by video chat and remote control software, between the two facilities. January 18, 2017 Canadian Science Minister Kirsty Duncan toured the complex.

== Medical isotope project ==
With the NRU reactor at the Chalk River Laboratories due to close in 2016, there was a need to find alternative sources of the medical isotope technetium-99m, a mainstay of nuclear medicine. In 2011 the Canadian Light Source received $14 Million in funding to investigate the feasibility of using an electron LINAC to produce molybdenum-99, the parent isotope of technetium-99. As part of this project a 35MeV LINAC has been installed in an unused underground experimental hall previously used for photonuclear experiments with the SAL LINAC. First irradiations are planned for late summer 2012, with the results to be evaluated by the Winnipeg Health Sciences Centre.

This project lead to the founding a spin-off company — Canadian Isotope Innovations Corporation (CIIC), which was described as part of CEO Rob Lamb's 'legacy of accomplishment' when he departed the facility in 2021. The CIIC declared bankruptcy in 2024.

== Education program ==
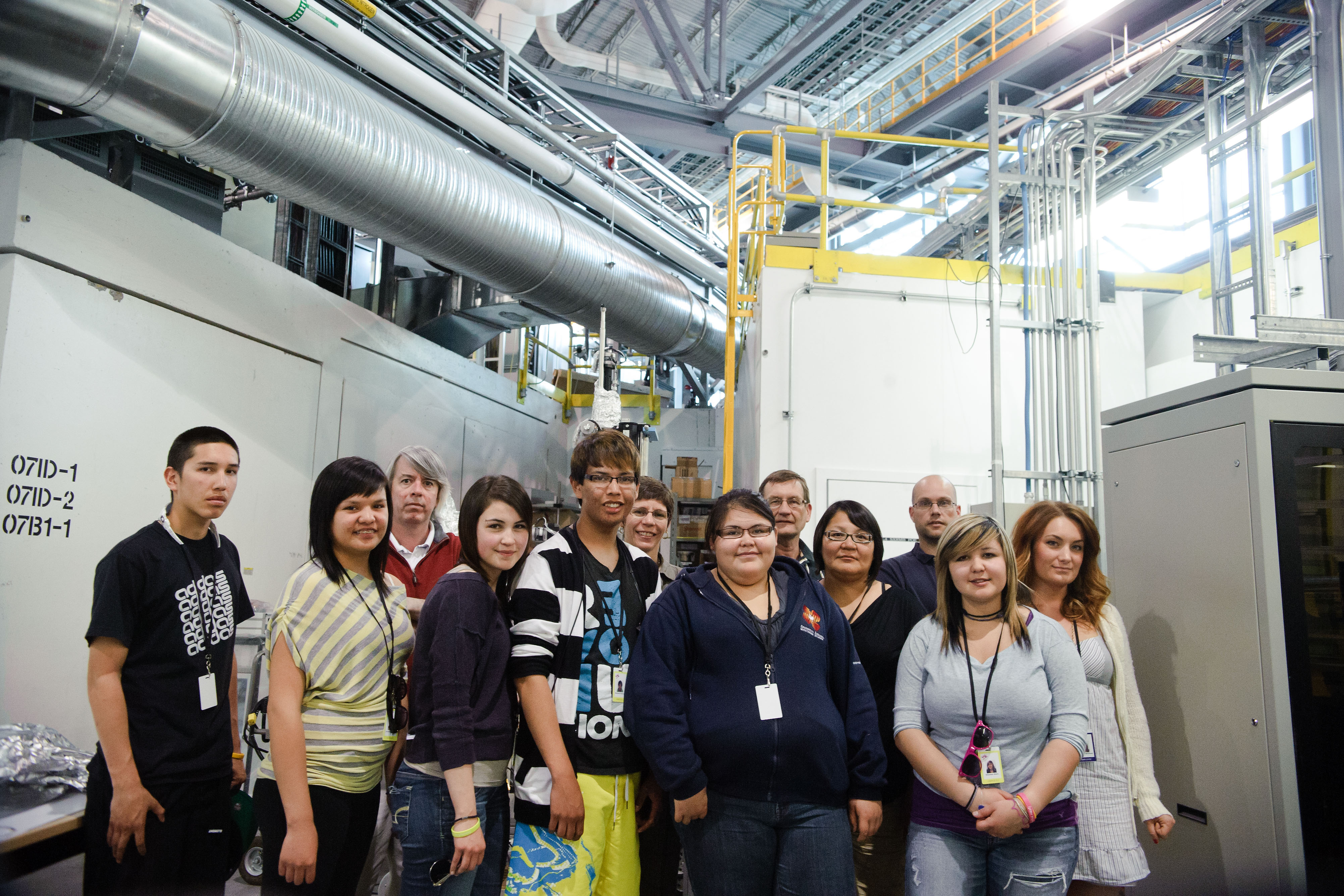
High school students from La Loche at the Canadian Light Source

The CLS has an education program – "Students on the Beamlines" – funded by NSERC Promoscience. This outreach program for science allows high school students to fully experience the work of a scientist, in addition to having the chance to use the CLS beamlines.

"The program allows students the development of active research, a very rare phenomena in schools and provides direct access to the use of a particle accelerator, something even rarer!" said teacher Steve Desfosses form College Saint-Bernard, Drummondville, Quebec.

Dene students from La Loche, Saskatchewan have taken part in this program twice, looking at effects of acid rain. Student Jontae DesRoches commented "Elders have noticed that the landscape, where trees used to grow, there's none growing anymore. They're pretty concerned because wildlife is disappearing. Like, here there used to be rabbits and now there's none". In May 2012 three student groups were at the CLS simultaneously, with the La Loche students as the first to use the IDEAS beamline.

"The aim for the students," according to CLS education and outreach coordinator Tracy Walker, "is to get an authentic scientific inquiry that's different from the examples in textbooks that have been done thousands of times." Students from six provinces as well as the Northwest Territories have been directly involved in experiments, some of which have yielded publishable-quality research.

In 2012 the CLS was awarded the Canadian Nuclear Society's Education and Communication Award "in recognition of its commitment to community outreach, increasing public awareness of synchrotron science, and developing innovative and outstanding secondary educational programs such as Students on the Beamlines".

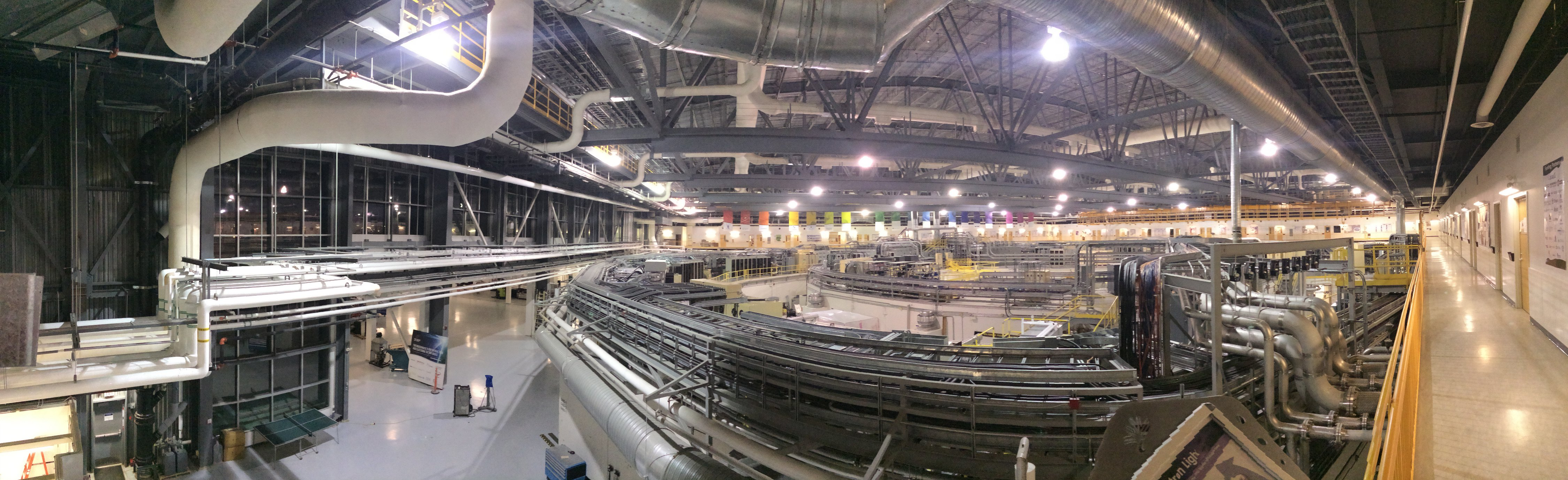
Mezzanine at night

== Technical description ==
=== Accelerators ===
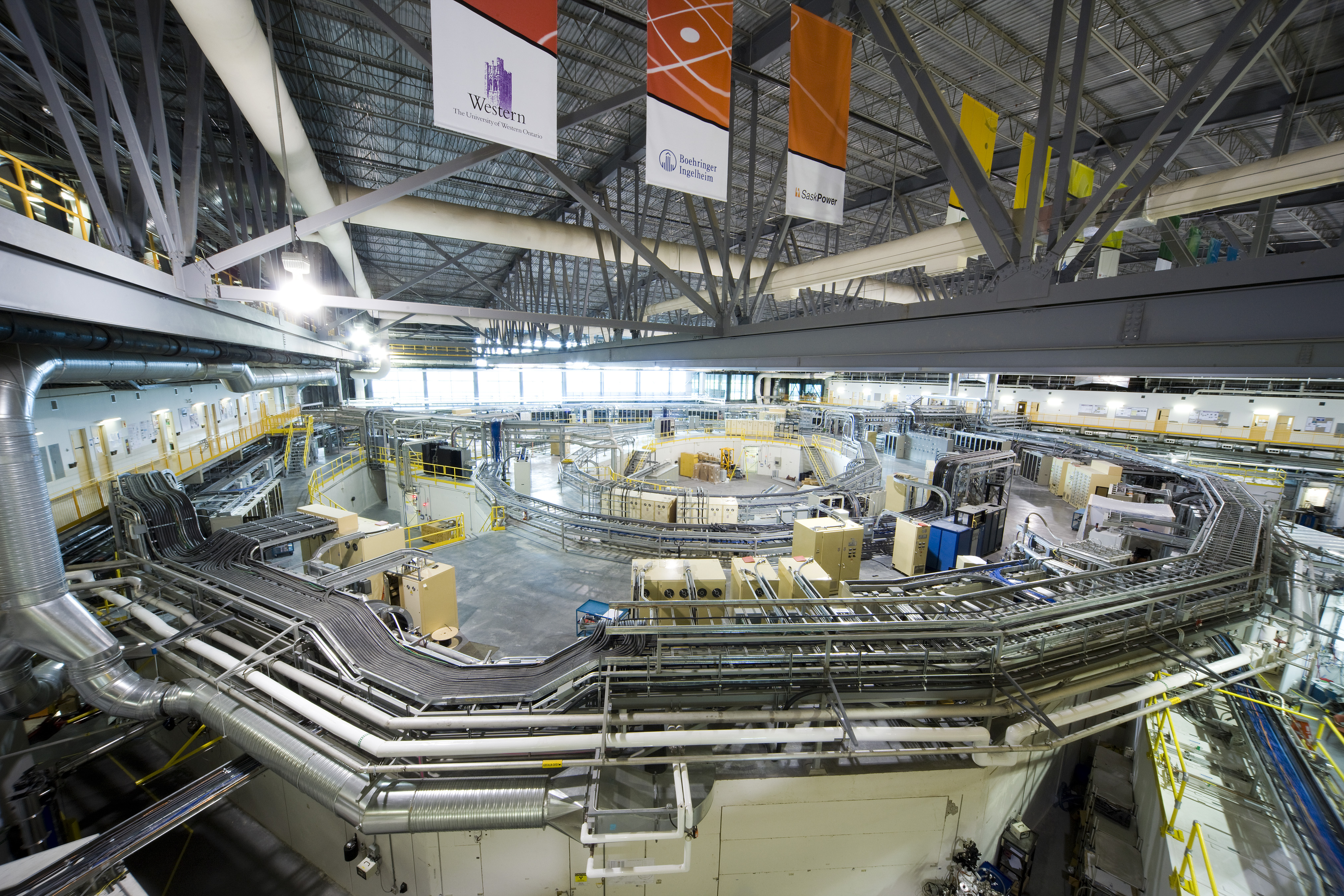
The booster and storage rings inside the experimental hall

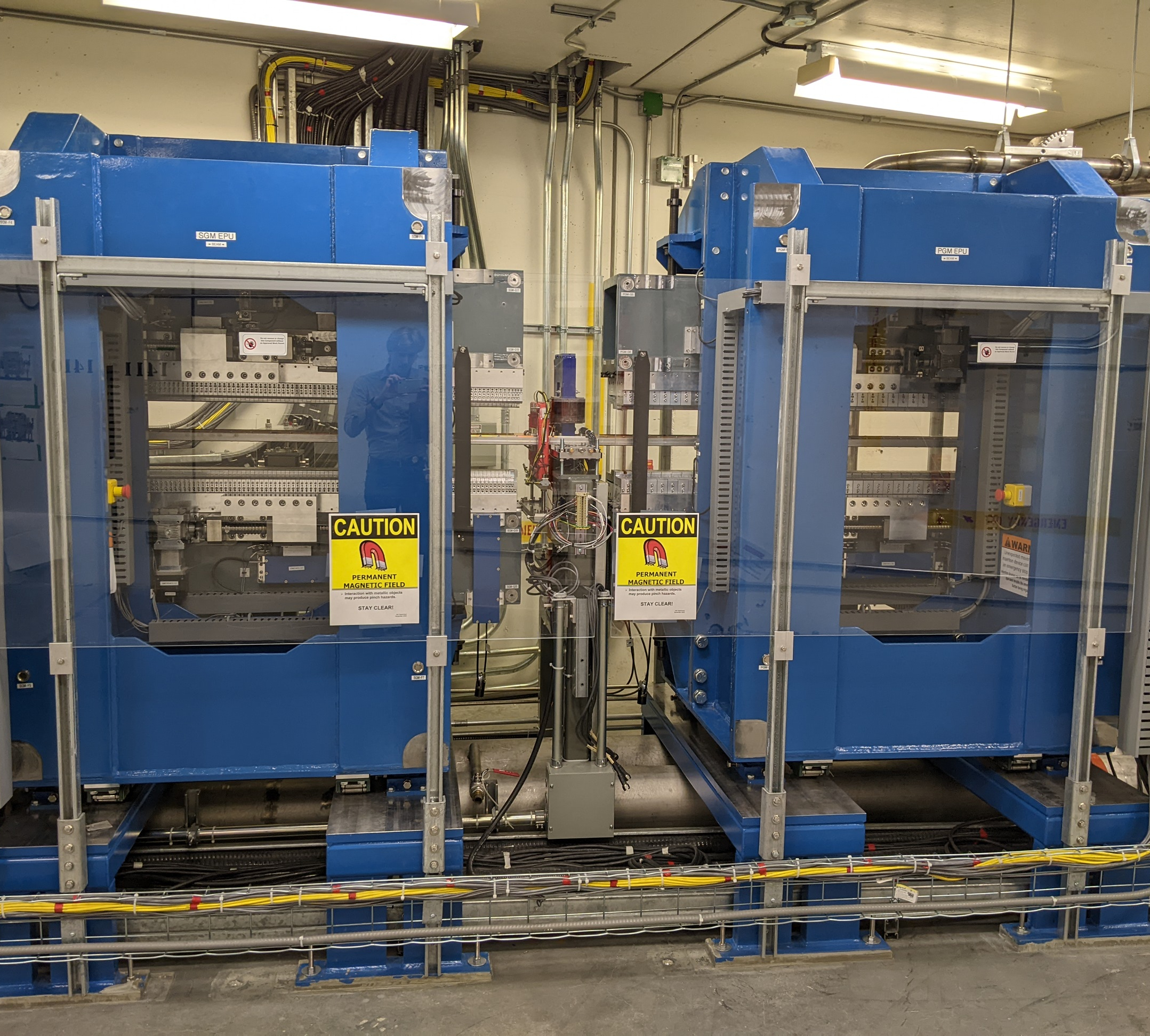
Chicaned undulators inside the storage ring

==== Injection system ====
The injection system consists of a 250 MeV LINAC, a low energy transfer line, a 2.9 GeV booster synchrotron and a high energy transfer line. The LINAC was operated for over 30 years as part of the Saskatchewan Accelerator Lab and operates at 2856 MHz. The 78m low energy transfer line takes the electrons from the below-ground LINAC to the ground level booster in the newer CLS building, via two vertical chicanes. The full energy 2.9 GeV booster, chosen to give high orbit stability in the storage ring, operates at 1 Hz, with an RF frequency of 500 MHz, unsynchronised with the LINAC. This results in significant beam loss at the extraction energy.

==== Storage ring ====
The storage ring cell structure has a fairly compact lattice with twelve straight sections available for injection, RF cavities and 9 sections available for insertion devices. Each cell has two bending magnets detuned to allow some dispersion in the straights – the so-called double-bend achromat structure – and thus reduce the overall beam size. As well as the two bend magnets each cell has three families of quadrupole magnets and two families of sextupole magnets. The ring circumference is 171m, with a straight section length of 5.2m. The CLS is the smallest of the newer synchrotron facilities, which results in a relatively high horizontal beam emittance of 18.2 nm-rad. The CLS was also one of the first facilities to chicane two undulators in one straight section, to maximize the number of insertion device beamlines.

All five of the phase I X-ray beamlines use insertion devices. Four use permanent magnet undulators designed and assembled at the CLS, including one in-vacuum undulator and one elliptically polarizing undulator (EPU); two of the Phase I insertion devices were later upgraded to elliptically polarizing undulators. The HXMA beamline uses a superconducting wiggler built by the Budker Institute of Nuclear Physics in Novosibirsk. Phase II added two further devices including another Budker superconducting wiggler, for the BMIT beamline. Phase III will add four more devices, filling 8 of the 9 available straight sections.

Since 2021, the ring operates in a top-up mode during normal user operations, injecting every few minutes to maintain a stable ring current just below 220 mA. Prior to this change, the ring operated with a fill current of 250mA in decay mode, with two injections per day. Facility status is shown on a "machine status" webpage, and using the CLSFC account on Twitter.

==== Superconducting RF cavity ====
The CLS was the first light source to use a superconducting RF (SRF) cavity in the storage ring from the beginning of operations. The niobium cavity is based on the 500 MHz design used at the Cornell Electron Storage Ring (CESR) which allows potentially beam-perturbing high order modes to propagate out of the cavity where they can be very effectively damped. The superconducting nature of the niobium cavity means only 0.02% of the RF power put into the cavity is wasted in heating the cavity as compared to roughly 40% for normal-conducting (copper) cavities. However, a large portion of this power saving - about 160 kW out of the 250 kW saved - is needed to power the cryogenic plant required to supply liquid helium to the cavity. The SRF cavity at CLS is fed with RF from a 310 kW Thales klystron.

=== Beamlines ===
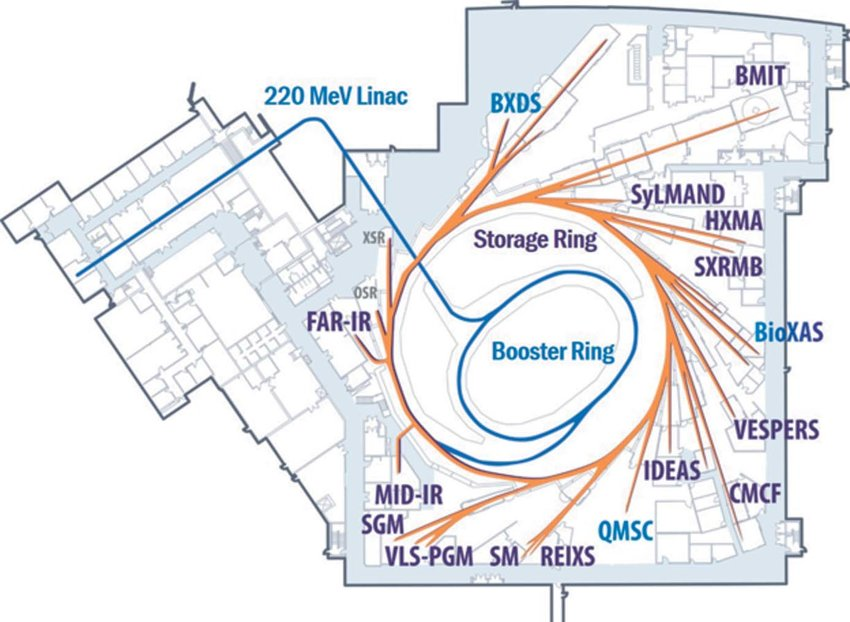
Layout of beamlines at the Canadian Light Source synchrotron

| ID | Name | Port assigned | Phase | Source | Energy range (keV unless stated) | Usage |
|---|---|---|---|---|---|---|
| BioXAS | Life science beamline for X-ray absorption spectroscopy | | 3 | Wiggler, in-vacuum undulator | | Life- and environmental science research using X-ray absorption spectroscopy and imaging. |
| BMIT-BM | Biomedical Imaging and Therapy | 05B1-1 | 2 | Bending Magnet | 8–40 | Imaging small to medium-sized animals (up to sheep size) |
| BMIT-ID | Biomedical Imaging and Therapy | 05ID-2 | 2 | Wiggler | 20–100 | Higher energy and larger animal capabilities than possible on the BM line |
| BXDS | Brockhouse X-ray diffraction and scattering sector | | 3 | In-vacuum undulator and wiggler | | Resonant- and non-resonant, small and wide angle X-ray scattering. X-ray diffraction. |
| CMCF-ID | Canadian Macromolecular crystallography Facility | 08ID-1 | 1 | in-vacuum undulator | 6.5–18 | Macromolecular crystallography beamline suitable for studying small crystals and crystals with large unit cells. |
| CMCF-BM | Canadian Macromolecular Crystallography Facility | 08B1-1 | 2 | Bending Magnet | 4–18 | High throughput macromolecular crystallography. |
| Far IR | High Resolution Far Infrared spectroscopy | 02B1-1 | 1 | Bending Magnet | 10–1000 cm^{−1} | Ultrahigh resolution infrared spectroscopy of gas-phase molecules |
| HXMA | Hard X-ray micro-Analysis | 06ID-1 | 1 | Wiggler | 5–40 | X-ray absorption fine structure, X-ray microprobe, X-ray diffraction |
| IDEAS | Educational beamline | | | Bending Magnet | | Purpose-built educational beamline |
| Mid IR | Mid IR Spectromicroscopy | 01B1-1 | 1 | Bending Magnet | 560–6000 cm^{−1} | Infrared spectromicroscopic imaging at diffraction-limited spatial resolution, and photoacoustic spectroscopy |
| OSR | Optical Synchrotron Radiation | 02B1-2 | 1 | Bending Magnet | | Accelerator beam diagnostic beamline operating in the visible range. |
| QMSC | Quantum Materials Spectroscopy Centre | | 3 | Double EPU | | Spin- and angle-resolved photoemission spectroscopy. |
| REIXS | Resonant Elastic and Inelastic X-ray Scattering | 10ID-2 | 2 | EPU | 80–2000 eV | Soft X-ray emission spectroscopy and resonant soft X-ray scattering. |
| SGM | High Resolution Spherical Grating Monochromator | 11ID-1 | 1 | EPU | 240–2000 eV | X-ray absorption spectroscopy, X-ray photoemission spectroscopy. Interchangeable endstations, allows use of non-UHV-compatible samples |
| SM | Soft X-ray Spectromicroscopy | 10ID-1 | 1 | EPU | 100–2000 eV | Scanning transmission X-ray microscopy, Photoemission electron microscopy. |
| SXRMB | Soft X-ray Microcharacterization Beamline | 06B1-1 | 2 | Bending Magnet | 1.7–10 | X-ray absorption fine structure, X-ray microprobe. |
| SyLMAND | Synchrotron Laboratory for Micro And Nano Devices | 05B2-1 | 2 | Bending Magnet | 1–15 | Deep X-ray lithography with large area format |
| VESPERS | Very Sensitive Elemental and Structural Probe Employing Radiation from a Synchrotron | 07B2-1 | 2 | Bending Magnet | 6–30 | Hard X-ray microprobe using X-ray diffraction and X-ray fluorescence. X-ray absorption spectroscopy. |
| VLS-PGM | Variable Line Spacing Plane Grating Monochromator | 11ID-2 | 1 | EPU | 5.5–250 eV | High resolution X-ray Absorption Spectroscopy |
| XSR | X-Ray Synchrotron Radiation | 02B2 | 1 | Bending Magnet | | Accelerator beam diagnostic beamline operating in the X-ray range. |

== See also ==
- List of synchrotron radiation facilities
- Plasma Physics Laboratory (Saskatchewan)
- Saskatchewan Accelerator Laboratory
- Canadian Synchrotron Radiation Facility
- G. Michael Bancroft
- Amira Abdelrasoul
- Innovation Place Research Park
- EPICS (Used for Accelerator and Beamline Control Systems)
- Canadian government scientific research organizations
- Canadian university scientific research organizations
- Canadian industrial research and development organizations
- Singularity Principle (movie filmed at the Canadian Light Source)
