= Ingrid J. Pickering =

Canadian geoscientist

- Born: England
- Spouse: Graham George

Academic background
- Education: BA, Natural Sciences, University of Cambridge; PhD, 1990, Imperial College London
- Thesis: The application of powder diffraction to the study of heterogeneous catalysis. (1990)

Ingrid Jane Pickering FRSC is a geoscientist. She is a professor and Canada Research Chair in Molecular Environmental Science at the University of Saskatchewan. In 2018, Pickering was the first woman appointed Chair of the Canada Foundation for Innovation Board of Directors.

== Early life and education ==
Pickering was born and raised in England where she attended the University of Cambridge and Imperial College London. Following the completion of her PhD, she conducted research at the Royal Institution of Great Britain before moving to North America. While in the United States, Pickering spent two years as a postdoctoral fellow with Exxon Research and Engineering Company before moving to the Stanford Synchrotron Radiation Lightsource (SSRL) at Stanford University.

== Career ==
In 2003, Pickering and her husband Graham George were both offered Tier 2 Canada Research Chair positions at the University of Saskatchewan to continue their research using the school's synchrotron light source. Although they were originally tentative to leave their faculty positions at Stanford University, George was convinced to move to Saskatchewan to work with the Canadian Light Source. Upon arriving in Saskatchewan, they collaborated with researchers at the SSRL to study how Zebrafish, lentil plants, contact lenses and caterpillars reacted to methylmercury cysteine. By 2012, Pickering was ranked one of the top three Canadian geoscientists by a Higher Education Strategy Associates survey and appointed to the Canada Foundation for Innovation Board of Directors.

As a result of her academic research using synchrotron light at the Canadian Light Source, Pickering was appointed a Tier 1 Canada Research Chair in Molecular Environmental Science and received Canada Foundation for Innovation equipment funding. In 2015, Pickering and her husband co-led a study in Bangladesh to test whether selenium supplements could protect people from arsenic poisoning. This study eventually earned her the 2018 Achievement Award by the Saskatchewan Health Research Foundation.

In 2018, Pickering was the first woman appointed Chair of the Canada Foundation for Innovation Board of Directors. She was also elected a Fellow of the Royal Society of Canada for "her pioneering work in synchrotron techniques that have led to highly cited findings on the effect of heavy metals on the environment and human health."

In August 2024, Pickering was appointed as Chief Science Officer of the Canadian Light Source.

== Personal life ==
Pickering and her husband Graham George have three children together.
