= Saskatchewan Accelerator Laboratory =

Canadian research facility

Coordinates: 52°08′12.5″N 106°37′52.5″W

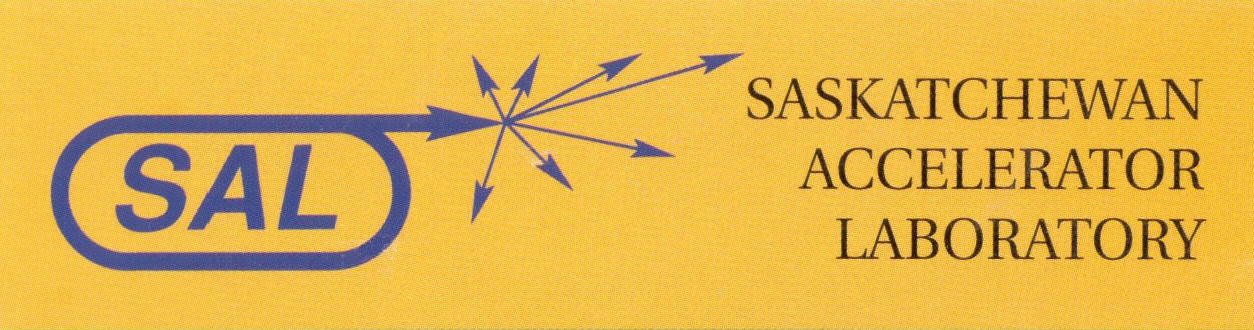
- Established: 1964
- Research type: Particle Accelerator
- Field of research: Nuclear Physics
- Director: Leon Katz; Dennis Skopik
- Location: Saskatoon, Saskatchewan, Canada

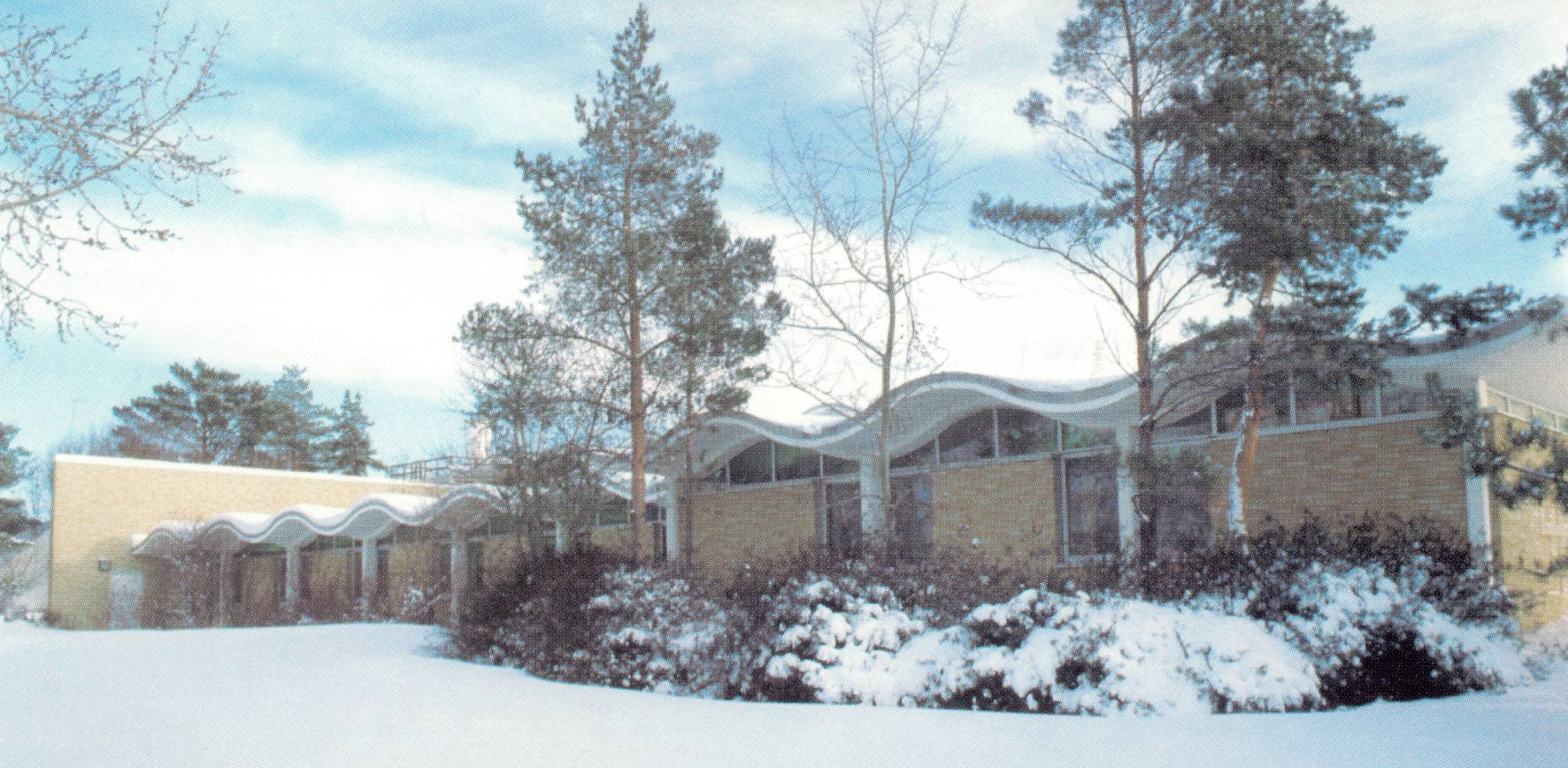
The above-ground SAL building, seen around 1994.

The Saskatchewan Accelerator Laboratory (SAL) was a linear accelerator facility on the University of Saskatchewan campus in Saskatoon, Saskatchewan, Canada. The facility was constructed in 1962 at a cost of $1.7M under the direction of Leon Katz. SAL was identified by the OECD as a National Large-Scale Facility. SAL provided support for radiology, chemistry and sub-atomic physics research.

== Beginnings: 1947–1961 ==
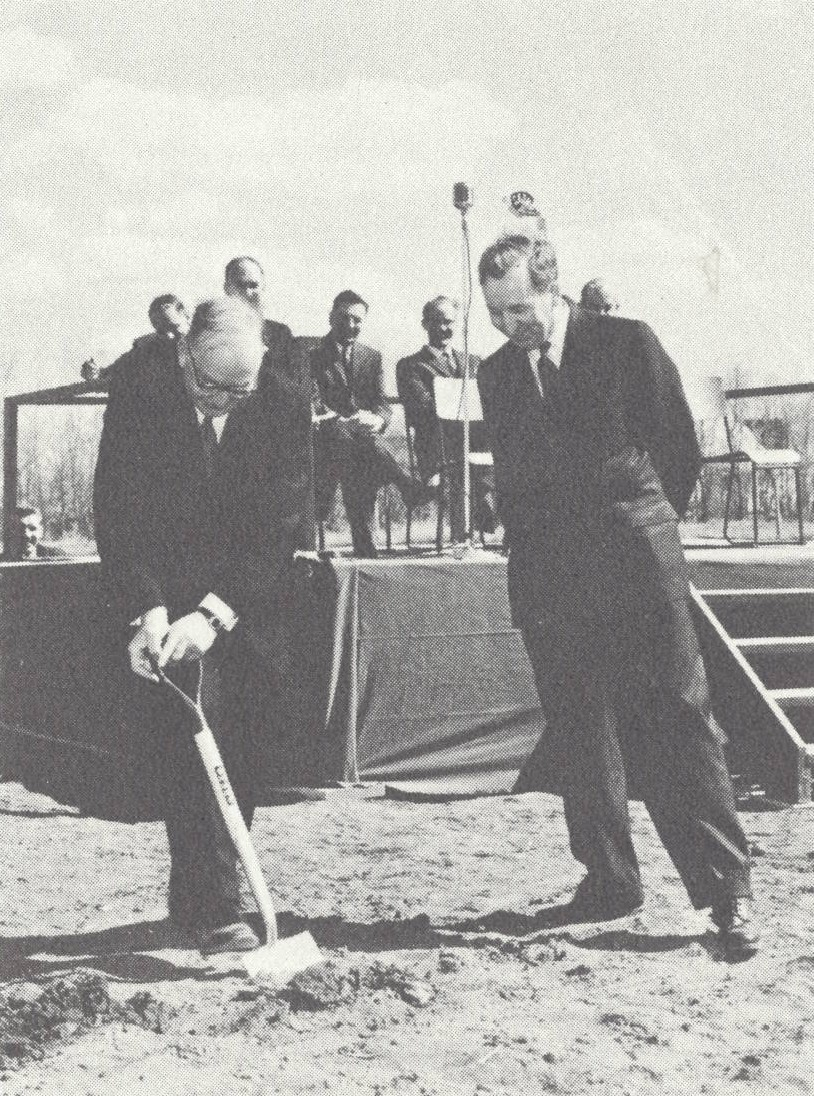
John Cockcroft turns the first sod for SAL. May 10, 1962.

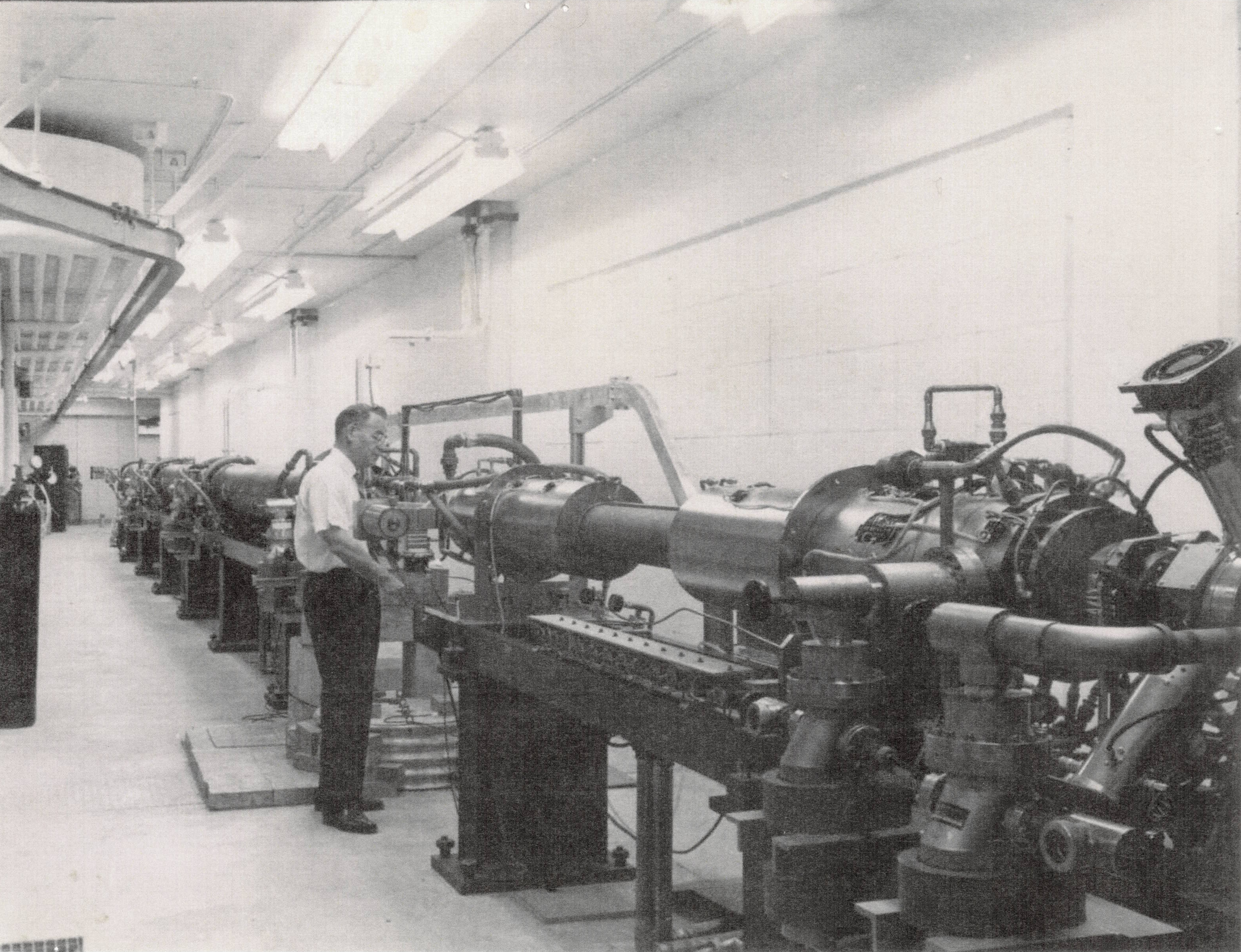
Leon Katz with the LINAC, around 1964

Around 1947 members of the Department of Physics at the University of Saskatchewan decided to obtain a 25 MeV Betatron. The principal interest was in nuclear physics, but they were also interested In the possible therapeutic uses for the treatment of cancer, and they obtained support from then-Saskatchewan Premier Tommy Douglas. Funding was obtained from the Atomic Energy Control Board , the National Research Council (NRC), the National Cancer Institute, local cancer societies and the university. The machine was installed in summer 1948 in a new building built in one angle of the existing Physics department, connected to the main building. It was manufactured by the Allis-Chalmers Company of Milwaukee, Wisconsin, and was very similar to the one being used at the time by Donald Kerst at the University of Illinois. The first cancer patient was treated on Mar. 29, 1949 starting the really first concerted clinical investigation of the usefulness of the betatron as a radiotherapeutic tool, with over 300 patients treated in 17 years of operation. The success of the program led to the installation of the world's first cobalt-60 source for radiotherapy at the university in 1951.

== Linear Accelerator: 1962–1983 ==
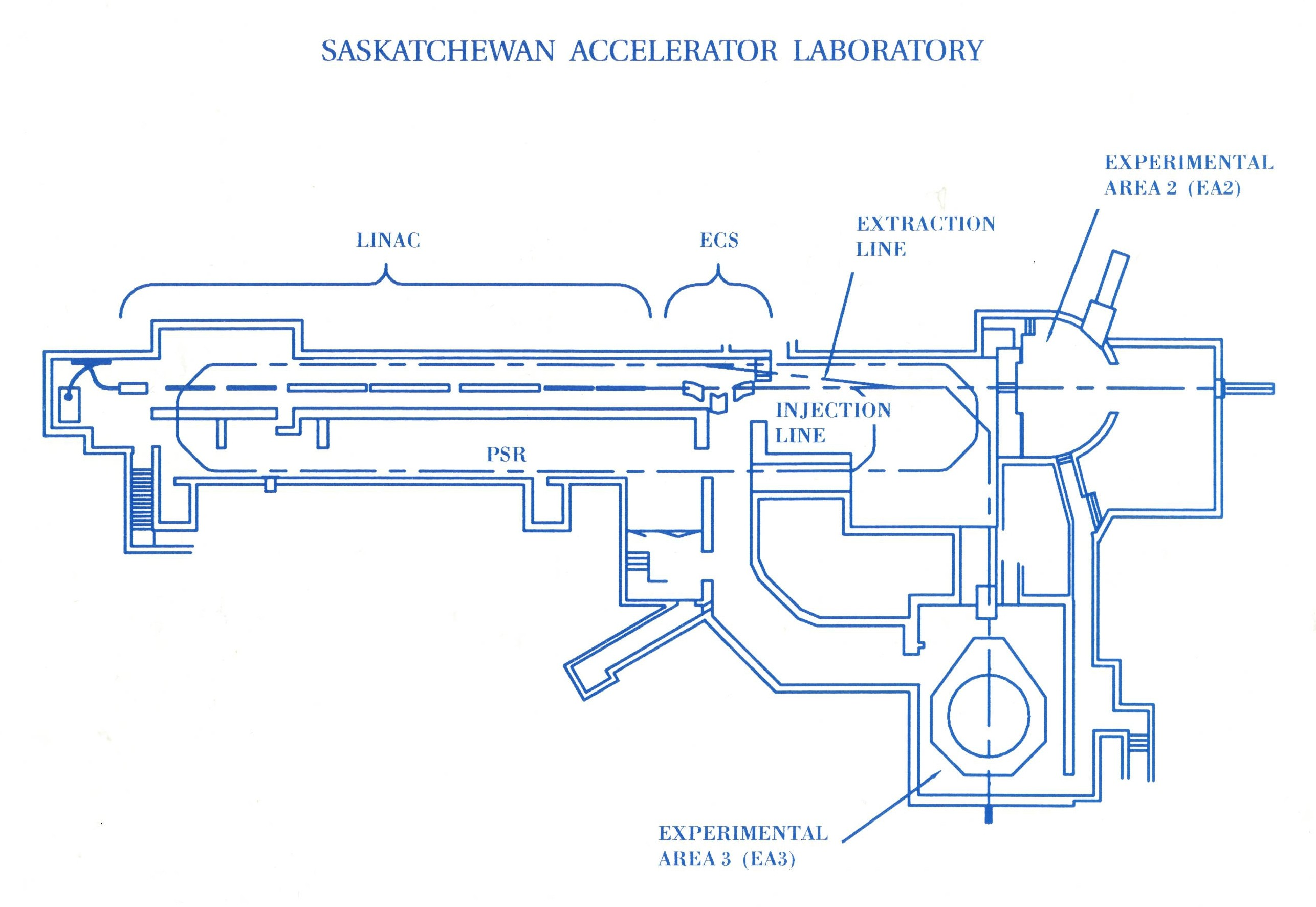
Layout of the SAL facility in 1994

The construction of the Linear Accelerator (LINAC) was announced in September 1961, and was portrayed as the next logical step on the university's research path. The 80-foot electron accelerator tube was to create energy six times that of the betatron. The cost of the $1,750,000 facility was split between NRC and the university, with the NRC meeting the cost of the equipment and the university assuming the costs of the new building required to house the machine.

Construction officially began on May 10, 1962, when Sir John Cockcroft, Nobel Prize in Physics winner, ceremonially turned the first sod. The Laboratory officially opened in early November 1964 with 75 visiting scientists from around the world in attendance, presenting papers and giving lectures over a period of several days, and hundreds of people showed up for the public open house. The first experiment was performed by a group from MIT in 1965.

The accelerator was designed and constructed by Varian Associates. It was a four-section 140 MeV machine operating, with the first section designed for higher current (and thus lower energy) for radiation chemistry. A 270" magnetic system at the end of the first section could divert the electron beam for such research. For radiation protection purposes the accelerator and research facilities were housed in an underground building with 10 feet of compacted gravel above it and considerably thicker shielding over the regions where the full beam intensity was diverted into the experimental areas. Part of the ancillary equipment included a magnetic spectrometer mounted on a rotating platform, modified from a naval gunmount supplied by the US Office of Naval Research.

The initial experimental program included inelastic electron scattering, photodisintegration, radiation chemistry, biophysics and radiation physics. During the 1970s SAL regularly published important nuclear physics results, and the LINAC was upgraded to 220 MeV in 1975, and 300 MeV in 1980.

== EROS: 1984–1996 ==
Linear accelerators have an inherently low duty cycle, and one solution to this is to add a storage ring - a so-called pulse-stretcher ring (PSR). The short particle bursts from the LINAC are injected into the storage ring, and in the time between two bursts the circulating electrons are slowly extracted from it, to give a nearly continuous beam. A PSR had been proposed for SAL as far back as 1971, and much of the pioneering work on PSRs had been performed by SAL scientists. In 1983 funding was obtained for a PSR for SAL, and the resulting machine was dubbed the Electron Ring of Saskatchewan (EROS). As an economical solution, the ring was squeezed into the existing building by the "ingenious expedient" of hanging it from the ceiling. An energy compression system was also installed in the late 1980s, and by 1990, with EROS operational, SAL was once more at the forefront of medium energy nuclear physics. In 1991 the underground experimental area EA2 was enlarged to house a new electron scattering spectrometer. By 1994 SAL was operating 24/7, delivering about 5000 hours of beam for experiments per year.

By the mid 1990s, the declining interest in sub-atomic science in Canada, and the need to refurbish the aging LINAC, convinced NSERC to phase out use of the LINAC. In 1994 an NSERC panel had proposed that a synchrotron should be built in Canada, and SAL director Dennis Skopik convinced the university to bid to host the new facility.

== The Canadian Light Source and the end of SAL ==
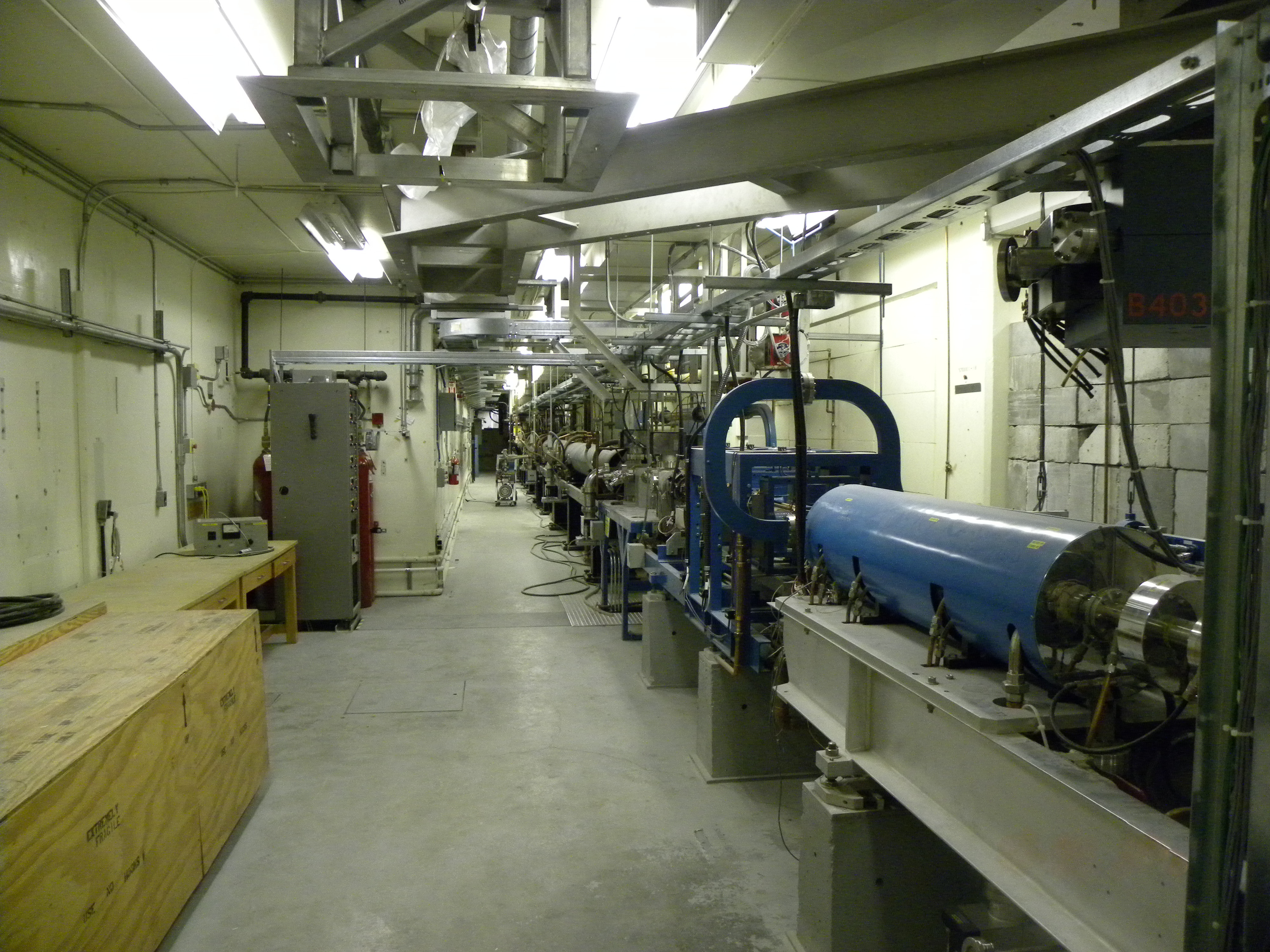
The SAL LINAC, seen at the CLS in 2011

The two Universities bidding to host the new synchrotron facility - the Canadian Light Source (CLS) were Saskatchewan and the University of Western Ontario (UWO). NSERC set up a committee of international experts to recommend one of the two sites. UWO, which operated the existing Canadian Synchrotron Radiation Facility at an American synchrotron, was the clear favourite. One committee member insisted there was no need to travel to Saskatoon in the dead of winter before deciding, as he had visited UWO and was convinced it should be the place. However, in 1996 the committee, which did in fact visit Saskatoon, recommended that the CLS be built in Saskatchewan. The reluctant member had been so impressed by SAL and its personnel that he changed his mind.

Western Economic Diversification funding was obtained for 1996–1999 to allow SAL to "phase out its subatomic physics work and retain its staff to undertake detailed engineering design work, research Canadian supply sources and move design implementation forward on the CLS project". Funding still had to be found for the new facility, and it was not until 1999, that the full funding needed was awarded.

At the start of the CLS construction project in 1999, SAL formally ceased operations and all staff members were transferred into a new not-for-profit corporation, Canadian Light Source Inc., CLSI, which had primary responsibility for the technical design, construction and operation of the new facility. The end-point tagger was transferred to MAX-Lab at Lund University. In 2002 the SAL LINAC was refurbished to operate at 250 MeV and now serves as part of the injection system for the CLS storage ring. The current CLS building, finished in 2001, incorporates the old SAL building, with much larger addition built directly adjoining it to house the synchrotron storage ring. The former SAL underground experimental area EA2 now houses a 35MeV LINAC which is part of a CLS project to produce the medical isotope technetium-99m, a mainstay of nuclear medicine.
