= Staff and Educational Development Association =

Staff and Educational Development Association (SEDA) is the professional association for staff and educational developers in the United Kingdom, promoting innovation and good practice in higher education. SEDA was created in 1993.

SEDA's activities are clustered into five main areas:

- Professional development
- Conferences and events
- Publications
- Research
- Services to members

== Professional recognition ==
- Fellow of the Staff and Educational Association (FSEDA)
- Associate Fellow of the Staff and Educational Association (AFSEDA)

SEDA accredits (recognises) professional development programs for all types of faculty and staff working in higher education institutions in the UK, and a few outside the UK. It does this through its Professional Development Framework which includes 16 "named awards" aimed at different roles or activities, which have different "specialist outcomes" but share common professional values and developmental outcomes.

== See also ==
- List of post-nominal letters
