= G. Michael Bancroft =

Canadian chemist (born 1942)

G. Michael Bancroft OC FRSC
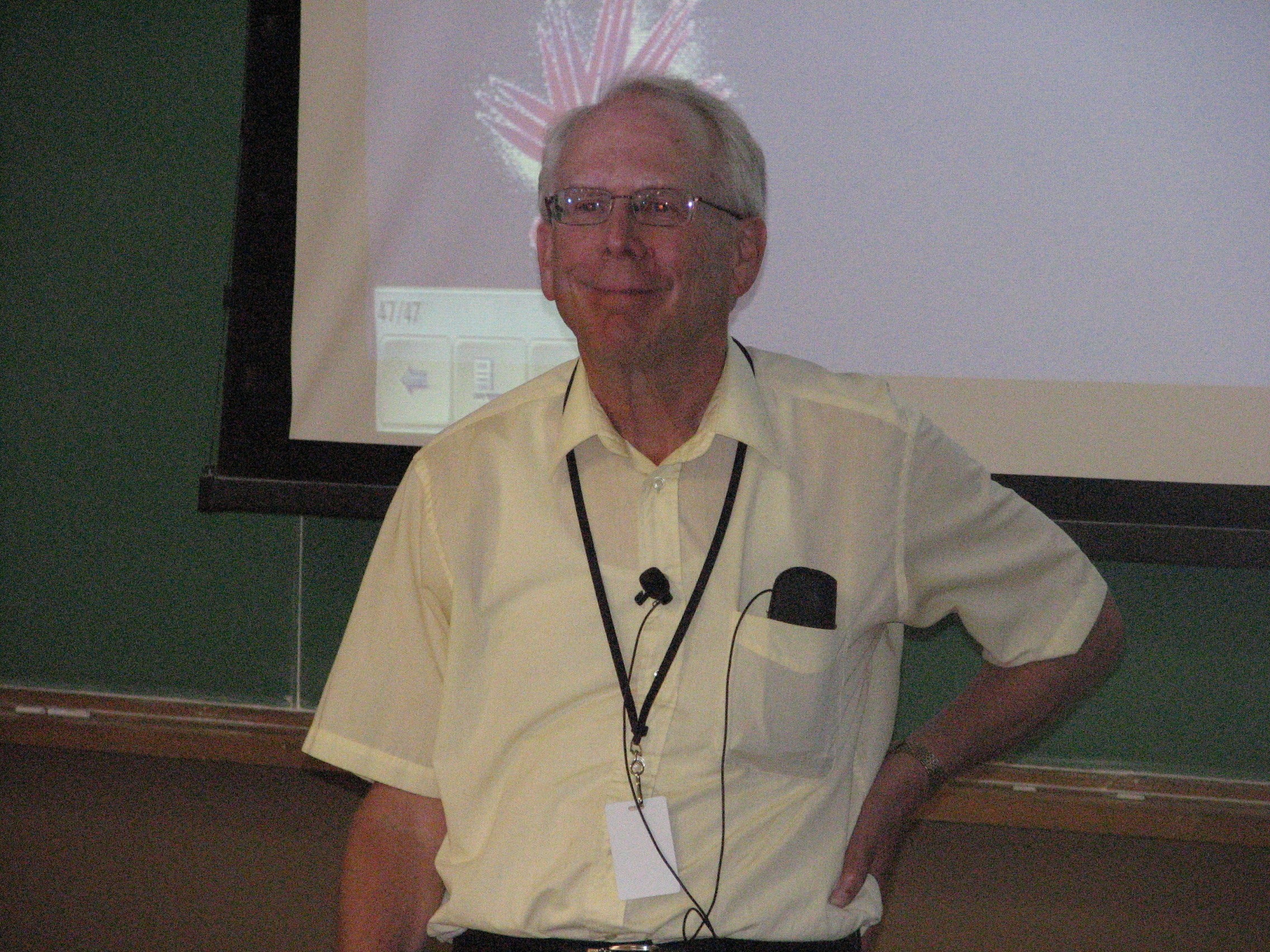
- Bancroft at the Canadian Light Source summer school in July 2012
- Born: 1942 (age 83–84); Saskatoon, Saskatchewan, Canada
- Education: University of Manitoba; University of Cambridge
- Known for: Mössbauer spectroscopy Synchrotron science
- Scientific career
- Fields: Chemistry
- Workplaces: University of Western Ontario; Canadian Light Source
- Doctoral advisor: A.G. Maddock

George "G." Michael Bancroft, OC FRSC, (born 1942) is a Canadian chemist and emeritus professor at the University of Western Ontario. One of the world's leading experts in Mössbauer spectroscopy, he is also known as one of the driving forces behind the development of synchrotron science in Canada, becoming the first director of the Canadian Light Source synchrotron after a 30-year "Odyssey".

== Early life and education ==
Bancroft was born in Saskatoon, Saskatchewan, the son of an accountant, but grew up in Winnipeg, Manitoba where he attended Kelvin High School. He graduated from the University of Manitoba in 1963, subsequently earning an MSc in chemistry (1964) from the same institution. Later that year he went to the University of Cambridge, England to study for a PhD at Corpus Christi College. He worked under the supervision of A.G. Maddock on the development of Mössbauer spectroscopy, obtaining his PhD in 1967. Over a 20-year period Bancroft would become one of the world's leading experts in Mössbauer spectroscopy, publishing more than 80 papers, a major review and an authoritative textbook in the field.

== University of Western Ontario ==
After working as a postdoc at the University of Manitoba, Bancroft returned to Cambridge as a Fellow at Christ's College.

Bancroft returned to Canada in 1970, as an assistant professor in the department of chemistry at the University of Western Ontario (UWO), becoming a professor in 1974, spending two periods as head of department. Bancroft was director of the Centre for Chemical Physics from 1977 to 1981, establishing Surface Science Western during his tenure. At UWO Bancroft became interested in photoemission spectroscopy, and in 1972, with National Research Council (NRC) support, a spectrometer was purchased for research using far ultraviolet and X-ray photons. This purchase also involved the universities of Toronto and Windsor in a Southwestern Ontario consortium.

== Canadian Synchrotron Radiation Facility ==
In 1972 Bancroft took part in a workshop organised by Bill McGowan of (UWO) on the uses of synchrotron radiation, an event he has described "the beginning of my 30 year odyssey to develop Canadian synchrotron capabilities in the US and then in Canada". He began work at the Synchrotron Radiation Center (SRC) at the University of Wisconsin-Madison, US, in 1975, as a result of contact established with then-SRC director Ed Rowe at the 1972 meeting. After several failed attempts were made to establish a synchrotron facility in Canada, Bancroft submitted a proposal to the NRC to build a Canadian beamline at SRC. In 1978 the newly created NSERC awarded capital funding, and the Canadian Synchrotron Radiation Facility (CSRF) was founded. CSRF, owned and operated by NRC, with Bancroft as scientific director, grew from the initial beamline to a total of three by 1998.

== Canadian Light Source ==
The push for a synchrotron lightsource in Canada gained impetus in the early 1990s with the formation of the Canadian Institute for Synchrotron Radiation (CISR) with Bancroft as president. In 1994 NSERC recommended building a Canadian synchrotron, and set up a committee to decide between two rival bids to host the facility, led by Dennis Skopik of the University of Saskatchewan and Bancroft of UWO. In 1996 the committee recommend that the Canadian Light Source (CLS) be built in Saskatoon. With the formation of the Canada Foundation for Innovation a funding mechanism for the lightsource became available, and after what Bancroft has described as a "Herculean" effort by the Saskatchewan team the funding was finalised in 1999. At this point Skopik departed to the US, and Bancroft was appointed as the first director of the CLS. Bancroft's appointment ended in 2001, although he remained as research director until 2004, and he returned to UWO. Bancroft's association with the CLS continues, and he currently serves on their board of directors.

== Awards and honours ==
Bancroft was elected as a Fellow of the Royal Society of Canada (RSC) in 1979 (at the age of 37), and was inducted into the Order of Canada in 2003. He was awarded the RSC's Rutherford Memorial Medal in 1980, a Guggenheim Fellowship in 1982/3, and the CIC and Montreal medals of the Chemical Institute of Canada in 1996 and 2002 respectively. The Canadian Light Source annual award for best PhD thesis is named for Bancroft.
