= Ontario Graduate Scholarship =

The Ontario Graduate Scholarship(s) (OGS) program offers merit-based annual scholarships to eligible students who will pursue graduate studies in order to complete a master's degree, PhD or doctorate at a university in Ontario, Canada.

The student must satisfy eligibility criteria and maintain a minimum academic standard of an "A−" or 80% average over the preceding two years of study in order to qualify for the scholarship. Final decisions on the candidacy of each individual is made by the Ministry of Training, Colleges and Universities, which has agreements with some universities that use a Pass or Fail system, such as York University does for some of its non-graded courses in the Faculty of Environmental Studies. Selections are based on reports to the ministry by an advisory agency known as the Selection Board (Ontario Graduate Scholarship), which consists of a chairperson and eight members representing five broad disciplines of study. The board meets twice a year to evaluate candidate applications for the OGS.

== Program ==
An Ontario Graduate Scholarship is awarded to a student for a single two- or three-term academic year in any non-professional graduate program; the terms must be consecutive. The scholarship, which is worth $5,000 per term, is not granted for just one term.

The recipient student must attend a full-time graduate program in Ontario during the course of the scholarship award, but may hold part-time employment of no more than 10 hours per week. However, students with disabilities may hold an OGS for part-time study.

Of the 3,000 scholarships awarded annually, 90 are reserved for students who have received a temporary resident visa as a member of the student class under the federal Immigration and Refugee Protection Act. This is also referred to as the "Temporary Resident Visa Student Class". Others are awarded to eligible candidates who are Canadian citizens, landed immigrants or permanent residents with preference for residents of Ontario.

A candidate will not be considered for an OGS if:

- the candidate has been convicted of an offence under the Ministry of Training, Colleges and Universities Act, the Canada Student Loans Act, or the Canada Student Financial Assistance Act
- the candidate has been convicted under the Criminal Code of fraud or theft in relation to any student assistance program or loan grant, or an award made by the Government of Ontario, the Government of Canada or the government of any other province or territory of Canada.

Students may not simultaneously hold an OGS scholarship and a scholarship from any of the Social Sciences and Humanities Research Council, the Natural Sciences and Engineering Research Council, or the Canadian Institutes of Health Research, or an Ontario Graduate Scholarship in Science and Technology (OGSST). A student may obtain at most two OGS awards at the master's level, but not after the second year, and up to four at the doctoral level, but not after the fifth year.

== Funding ==
Funding for the award is provided by the provincial government, which contributes two-thirds of the grant total, and the university attended by the student, which contributes the remaining one-third. However, some universities depend on matching private donations to offer the scholarship, and if donations are insufficient, the student is not eligible to use the award at that institution. This is because two thirds of the value of every OGS award is provided by the government of Ontario.

One third of the value of every award is provided by the university from eligible matched sources. In 2003, Toronto-Dominion Bank made a $900,000 endowment donation to the University of Waterloo. The endowment established six annual awards that would provide $5,000 of matching funds for an OGS recipient at UW. The same year, Wayne and Isobel Fox donated $1 million to establish matching funding for ten yearly OGS awards. MDS Inc. donated $333,000 to The University of Western Ontario in 2005 to establish the Ron Yamada Ontario Graduate Scholarship Fund for graduate engineering students, which will award matching grants for three OGS or OGSST scholarships.

In 2010, the Italian Cultural Centre of Durham donated $30,000, about one third of the total from the Oshawa Italian Recreation Club, to create an endowment for five annual OGS scholarships and eleven undergraduate scholarships for the University of Ontario Institute of Technology. The endowment enables an exchange program with the Polytechnic University of Turin, which signed a letter of intent for three scholarships.

Various private funds have been established at the University of Guelph to provide matching funds for OGS scholarships to students at the university: ten for students in any program; three for students in the Ontario Veterinary College; seven for students in the Ontario Agricultural College; five for students in the College of Arts (COA), three for those in the College of Social & Applied Human Sciences (CSAHS), and one for those in either the COA or CSAHS; one for students in the College of Physical & Engineering Science; and one for students in any program except the College of Management & Economics.

At The University of Western Ontario during the academic year from September 2007 to August 2008, "294 students received $3.1 million from the Ontario Graduate Scholarship Program".

== Application ==
Applications are due in October to the attending university. Non-matriculating applicants apply directly to the Ministry of Training, Colleges and Universities. Some institutions suggest to all qualified undergraduate students to submit an application; the student may later decline its award if that student has no interest in pursuing graduate studies, as Ryerson University did for its 2009 application process. Candidates need not have been accepted to a graduate program by the application filing deadline, as the deadline for OGS application, as that of many federal and provincial scholarships, is before the application filing deadline of most graduate programs.

The student application must be accompanied by two academic assessment reports completed by professors who act as a reference for the student. Each professor assesses several characteristics of the candidate student, specifically background preparation, originality, ability at research, research potential, industriousness, judgement, oral and written skills, and overall ability, within the top 2%, 5%, 10%, 20%, 50% or bottom 50% of students at a similar stage previously evaluated by that professor.

A complete application package will include:

- the application form, which includes personal data (page 1), education information (page 2), notice, consent, declaration and applicant signature (page 3), and any additional information (page 4)
- official university transcripts of applicable undergraduate and graduate studies to the end of August of the year in which application is submitted
- two academic assessment reports, which must be completed and signed by the referees, and which may contain attachments which must also be completed and signed by the referees
- Temporary Resident Visa Student Class documentation for foreign applicants with a student visa
- the student checklist, which must be signed by the applicant
- a summary sheet signed by the applicant
- either a Statement of Interest or a Plan of Study
- a list of significant academic accomplishments
- a list of awards and scholarships received by the student

The student application requires a social insurance number (SIN) for Canadian citizens; the requirement is waived for foreign applicants with a student visa, but they must supply a copy of the Temporary Resident Visa Student Class document. Personal data is retained by the ministry and is not shared with the Selection Board or panels.

Modifications to the submitted application may be made by the student to the institution's graduate office, or to the Ontario Graduate Studies Officer of the Ministry of Training, Colleges and Universities. However, modifications are limited to the applicants name, address and phone number, birthdate, student number, citizenship status, discipline code and level of study (proposed and current studies), and the number of OGS awards.

== Selection Board and panels ==
Selections are based on reports to the ministry by an advisory agency known as the Selection Board (Ontario Graduate Scholarship), established on 1 September 1975, which consists of a chairman and eight board members appointed by the Lieutenant Governor of Ontario for an indefinite term. The eight members of the board must represent the humanities (2 positions), social sciences (2), applied sciences (1), biological sciences (2) and physical sciences (1), and the board's function is to meet in Toronto in November and March of each year to evaluate the dossiers of candidate applicants for the OGS. The current chair, since 26 September 2001, is Pascal van Lieshout; his term expires on 31 August 2010.

The Selection Board establishes three-member panels which evaluate candidates based on the applications received; one member is selected as the chairperson. The panel will reject without qualification any application from a student that does not satisfy the eligibility criteria or is not submitted by the deadline. For each application from an eligible student, a rating sheet is completed by the panel. It consists of three sections: student identification (name, student number, level of study, and a code for the discipline of study), the panel ranking (a panel number and panel chair signature, and either successful, reversion, or unsuccessful), and the board ranking (board member signature and either successful, reversion, or unsuccessful). If two panel members differ in their assessment of a candidate by three or more points, an anomaly report is generated, requiring a conference call between the panel chair and the other two members. If the anomaly remains unresolved, the chairperson may investigate the matter and issue a final decision.

The Selection Board submits to the Ministry of Training, Colleges and Universities lists of successful and unsuccessful candidates for each of the doctoral, master's, and student visa classes, as well as a reversion list for each class.

The ministry notifies successful applicants by mid-April, to which it must receive a complete Notice of Acceptance from the student by the end of June. Failure to submit the Notice of Acceptance may result in withdrawal of the scholarship by the ministry.

The student may request a deferral of the award of up to 16 months for medical reasons, a maternity or paternity leave, or on compassionate grounds for exceptional circumstances. The latter is considered by the Selection Board. A deferral extension may be requested by the student from the Selection Board.
