= Padua Playwrights =

- Formation: 1978
- Founders: Murray Mednick and John Woodruff
- Type: Theatre group
- Location: Los Angeles

Padua Playwrights Productions, or Padua, is a Los Angeles-based theater company founded in 1978 by playwright and poet Murray Mednick and John Woodruff. The company ceased operation in 1995 and re-emerged in 2001, under the direction of Guy Zimmerman.

== Padua Hills Playwrights' Workshop/Festival ==
In 1978, Mednick received funding as part of a faculty position at La Verne University to found the Padua Hills Playwrights' Workshop at the Padua Hills estate in the San Gabriel foothills. He and five other playwrights, among them Theatre Genesis colleagues Sam Shepard and María Irene Fornés, met with nine writing students and established a pattern of exercises, rehearsals, and informal presentations. Most of those were site-specific, since the estate had plenty of outdoor spaces but no theater. Between 1984 and 1995, Padua moved around Southern California and hosted festivals at Cal Arts, Loyola Marymount University, Pacific Design Center, Cal State Northridge, Woodbury University and USC. Many prominent playwrights and actors participated in the workshop, including John Steppling, John O'Keefe, Jon Robin Baitz and Kelly Stuart.

Padua took a non-consumerist approach to playwriting. Founding member John Steppling cites this as one of the reasons Padua didn't garner as much press as he felt that it should have. Padua's focus on the artistic process, as opposed to the final product, made it difficult to market: “It’s easy to see how Padua never acquired a 'franchise,'” Steppling said, as “Padua had nothing to sell".

One overarching practice in many Padua Hills Festival plays was their site-specificity. Mednick stressed reliance on “language in relation to space” in his teaching." In 1984, a performance of Mednick's The Coyote Cycle was videotaped outdoors with Murray Mednick, Darrell Larson, Norbert Weisser, Priscilla Cohen, Christine Avila. A 1985 production of The Coyote Cycle took place from sundown to sunrise outdoors at the Paramount Ranch in the Santa Monica Mountains. Audience members huddled in sleeping bags were led from one part of the ranch to another by flashlight between scenes.

The Padua Hills Workshop/Theater Company ceased operations in 1995, citing financial difficulties.

== Padua Playwrights Press ==
In 1994, Padua Playwrights Press published "Best of the West," an anthology of eight works staged between 1989 and 1991. They went on to publish several other works, including "Plays from the Padua Hills Playwrights Festivals" (2003), "3 Plays by Murray Mednick" (2003), "The Coyote Cycle" by Murray Mednick (2003), "Hipsters in Distress" (2005), and "Plays for a New Millennium" (2004). Padua Hills Press is distributed nationally by Theatre Communications Group. They also published "Beneath the Dusty Trees: The Gary Plays" and "Fever Dreams."

== Padua Playwrights Productions ==
In 2001, Padua returned as Padua Playwrights Productions. Mednick appointed playwright and director, Guy Zimmerman as the artistic director. The new Padua took place indoors, but the dramatic works remained in line with the anti-institutional, pro-playwright stance of its predecessor. “[Padua means] being an outlaw and misfit within the theater community. We need Padua for artistic nourishment, ” said Roxanne Rogers, a director and original Padua participant, upon the founding of the new Padua. The revived company has staged dozens of productions and won awards from LA Weekly, Garland, Los Angeles Drama Critics Circle, the American Theatre Critics Association.

== Productions, 1978–1995 ==
Year	Location	Title	Writer	Director	Cast	Notes
1978	Claremont	Coyote I: Pointing	Murray Mednick	Murray Mednick	Darrell Larson, Norbert Weisser	
1978	Claremont	Red Woman	Sam Shepard	Sam Shepard		
1978	Claremont	In Service	María Irene Fornés	María Irene Fornés		
1979	Claremont	Coyote II: The Shadow Ripens	Murray Mednick	Murray Mednick	Priscilla Cohen, Christine Avila, Norbert Weisser, Darrell Larson	
1979	Claremont	Curse of the Starving Class	Sam Shepard	Sam Shepard		
1979	Claremont	The Visit	María Irene Fornés	María Irene Fornés		
1980	Claremont	Iron Lace on the Widow’s Walk	Constance Russell Monaghan	Constance Russell Monaghan	Norbert Weisser, Laura Owens, Lola Glaudini	
1980	Claremont	Barbeque	John Steppling	John Steppling		
1980	Claremont	Alive	Walter Hadler	Walter Hadler	Lola Glaudini	
1980	Claremont	Have You Ever Listened Very Long to the Hush	Susan Forscey	Susan Forscey		
1980	Claremont	Coyote III: Planet of the Spider People	Murray Mednick	Murray Mednick	Darrell Larson, Norbert Weisser, Ellen Blake	
1980	Claremont	The Man Who Killed the Buddha	Martin Epstein	Martin Epstein	John Finch	
1981	Claremont	Service	Michael Monroe	Michael Monroe	Joe Spano, Lorinne Vozoff	
1981	Claremont	Gentle Arts	Susan La Tempa	Susan La Tempa		
1981	Claremont	The Insistence Upon the Listener	John Steppling	John Steppling	Laura Fanning, John Horn, Natasha Mitchnick	
1981	Claremont	Coyote IV: Other Side Camp	Murray Mednick	Murray Mednick	Darrell Larson, Norbert Weisser, Christine Avila	
1981	Claremont	The Visit	María Irene Fornés	María Irene Fornés	Norbert Weisser, James F. Dean, Toni Beshara, Patricia Mattick	
1981	Claremont	Possum Song	Martin Epstein	Martin Epstein	John Finch, Grace Woodward, Dallas Alinder, James F. Dean	
1982	Claremont	Mysteries of the Bridal Night	Martin Epstein	Martin Epstein	Don Keith Opper, Laura Fanning, Kelly Stuart	
1982	Claremont	Bercilak’s Dream	John O’Keefe	John O’Keefe	Elizabeth Ruscio, Tina Preston, Denise Dillard, Susan Kampe, Patricia Mattick	
1982	Claremont	Hoss Drawin	Leon Martell	Leon Martell	Elizabeth Ruscio, Leon Martell	
1982	Claremont	Coyote V: Listening to Old Nana	Murray Mednick	Murray Mednick	Priscilla Cohen, Ellen Blake, Darrell Larson, Norbert Weisser	
1982	Claremont	Sunset Beach	Susan La Tempa	Susan La Tempa	Kathleen Cramer, Roxanne Rogers, Lee Kissman, James F. Dean, Ricky Manoff	
1982	Claremont	You Can Swim in the Danube, but the Water is too Cold	María Irene Fornés	María Irene Fornés	Leon Martell, Dudley Knight, Patricia Mattick, Lee Kissman, Morgan Weisser, Lola Glaudini, Jessica Wood	
1982	Claremont	Neck	John Steppling	John Steppling	Leon Martell, Dudley Knight, Patricia Mattick, Lee Kissman, Morgan Weisser, Lola Glaudini, Jessica Wood	
1982	Claremont	Untitled	Toni Beshara, Susan Champagne, Cathy Comenas, Sarah Lovett, Connie Monaghan	Tove Johnson	Leon Martell, Dudley Knight, Patricia Mattick, Lee Kissman, Morgan Weisser, Lola Glaudini, Jessica Wood	
1982	Claremont	Politesse—A Piece for Tape and Landscape	Michael Monroe		Patricia Mattick	
1982	Claremont	Guys in black Leather Jackets Ducking Into Phone Booths	Connie Monaghan			
1982	Claremont	Correspondence	Cindy Myers			
1983	Claremont	Mud	María Irene Fornés	María Irene Fornés	Mary Jo Pearson, Gregory Pace, John O'Keefe	
1983	Claremont	1961 El Dorado	Leon Martell, Elizabeth Ruscio	Leon Martell, Elizabeth Ruscio	Leon Martell, Elizabeth Ruscio	
1983	Claremont	Polar Bear	John Steppling	John Steppling		
1983	Claremont	Primitives	Elizabeth Wray	Elizabeth Wray	Priscilla Cohen, Ellen Blake, John Diehl	
1983	Claremont	Interbellum	Michael Monroe	Michael Monroe		
1983	Claremont	Skin	Sarah Lovett	Sarah Lovett	Bob Behling, Rhona Gold	
1983	Claremont	Don’t Ever Call Me Anything but Mother	John O'Keefe	John O’Keefe	Tina Preston	
1983	Claremont	Untitled, 1957	Susan La Tempa	Susan La Tempa	Mary Jo Pearson, Gregory Pace, Elizabeth Ruscio, Lorinne Vozoff	
1983	Claremont	Variations	Martin Epstein	Martin Epstein	Patricia Mattick, Roxanne Rogers, Leon Martell	
1984	Cal Arts	No Time	María Irene Fornés	María Irene Fornés	Tina Preston	
1984	Cal Arts	Guys at the Spunk Hole	Leon Martell	Leon Martell	Morgan Weisser, Jesse Shepard, Lola Glaudini, Mark Petrakis	
1984	Cal Arts	Mimzabim	Leon Martell	Leon Martell	Roxanne Rogers, Gregory Pace, Robert Ernst	
1984	Cal Arts	Transcendental Etudes	Michael Monroe	Michael Monroe	Elizabeth Ruscio, Rene Assa, Kurt Garfield	
1984	Cal Arts	Everything in Its Place	John Steppling	John Steppling	Lee Kissman, Lee Kerwin, Kathleen Cramer, Robert Glaudini	
1984	Cal Arts	Scenes from University Life, Part II	Susan La Tempa	Susan La Tempa	Mary Jo Pearson	
1984	Cal Arts	Air-Conditioned Beach #2	Walter Hadler	Walter Hadler	Robert Glaudini, Marilyn Dodds-Frank, Natasha Mitchnick, Frat Fuller, Frederick Lopez	
1984	Cal Arts	Coyote VII: He Brings the Waterfall	Murray Mednick	Murray Mednick	Darrell Larson, Norbert Wiesser	
1985	Paramount Ranch	The Coyote Cycle	Murray Mednick	Murray Mednick	Darrell Larson, Norbert Weisser, Christine Avila, Priscilla Cohen, Tavish Graham, Morgan Weisser	
1986	Loyola Marymount	How Gertrude Stormed the Philosopher's Club	Martin Epstein	Martin Epstein		
1986	Loyola Marymount	Zohar	Murray Mednick	Murray Mednick		
1986	Loyola Marymount	Untitled	María Irene Fornés	María Irene Fornés		
1986	Loyola Marymount	True Beauties	Julie Hebert	Julie Hebert		
1986	Loyola Marymount	Untitled	John Steppling	John Steppling		
1986	Loyola Marymount	The Magician	John O'Keefe	John O'Keefe		
1986	Loyola Marymount	The Magician	John O'Keefe	John O'Keefe		
1986	Loyola Marymount	Kingfish	Marlane G. Meyer	Marlane G. Meyer		
1988	Pacific Design Center	Drowning	María Irene Fornés	Roxanne Rogers	Don Keith Opper, Jon C. Slade	
1988	Pacific Design Center	Vera	Martin Epstein	Martin Epstein	Kathleen Kramer	
1988	Pacific Design Center	Babbler	John O’Keefe	Jan Munroe	Tina Preston, Scott Paulin, Joe Kane	
1988	Pacific Design Center	A Good Touch	Susan Champagne	Pattricia Mattick	Ellen Blake, Molly Cleator	
1988	Pacific Design Center	The Ballad of the Sleepy Heart	David Schweizer	David Schweizer	Phillip Littell	
1988	Pacific Design Center	Mendoza	Rex Weiner	Rex Weiner		
1988	Pacific Design Center	Like a Shadow Singing	Lynn Montgomery	Lynn Montgomery	Ingrid Oliu	
1989	Pacific Design Center	Shimmer	John O'Keefe	John O'Keefe		
1989	Pacific Design Center	Amado Amor (Beloved Love)	Alan Bolt	Amy Glazer-Connolly	Darrell Larson, Page Leong, Craig Ryan Ng, Ingrid Oliu, Susan Rome, Norm Skaggs, John Lacques	
1989	Pacific Design Center	Cities Out of Print	Susan Mosakowski	Susan Mosakowski	John Diehl, Shawna Casey	
1989	Pacific Design Center	The Ordeal of Nancy Fergusson	Martin Epstein	Martin Epstein	Kathleen Cramer, Don Keith Opper, John Achorn, Jack Slater	
1989	Pacific Design Center	Increments of Three	John Pappas	John Pappas	Robert Hummer, John Pappas, Deirdre Hade	
1989	Pacific Design Center	Kindling	Leon Martell	Leon Martell	Molly Cleator, Rick Dean, Jim Hynie, Leonard Donato	
1989	Pacific Design Center	Almost Asleep	Julie Hebert	Julie Hebert	Mary Forcade, Patricia Mattick, Tina Preston	
1989	Pacific Design Center	The Theory of Miracles	John Steppling	John Steppling	Mick Colins, Kathleen Cramer, Taylor Donlan, Nick Flynn, Gill Gayle, Rachel Powell, Jack Slater, Murray Mednick	
1990	Art and Design Center at Cal State Northridge	Ball and Chain	Kelly Stuart	Kelly Stuart	James Oseland, Roberta Wallach, James Storm, Diane Defoe, Demosthenes Stathiginnopoulos	
1990	Art and Design Center at Cal State Northridge	Our Witness	Martin Epstien	Martin Epstien	Ann Marie Baldwin, Dave Higgins, Dendrie Taylor	
1990	Art and Design Center at Cal State Northridge	Storyland	John Steppling	John Steppling	Rick Dean, Mick Collins, Laura Fanning, Kathleen Cramer, Alexis Steppling, Demosthenes Stathigiannopoulos, Nick Flynn, Robert Glaudini, Thomas George Carter	
1990	Art and Design Center at Cal State Northridge	Bondage	Susan Champagne	Susan Champagne	Molly Cleator, Roxanne Rogers, John Pappas, Dan Sullivan, Jeff Levy, Douglas Heller	
1990	Art and Design Center at Cal State Northridge	Book of Numbers	Roxanne Rogers	Roxanne Rogers	Pamela Gordon, Joe Bellan, Robin Frates, Robert Hummer	
1990	Art and Design Center at Cal State Northridge	Shatter'n Wade	Murray Mednick	Murray Mednick	David Officer, William Dennis Hunt, Scott Paulin, Susannah Blinkoff, Matthew Goulish, Mark Fite, Allison Studdiford, Nick Love, Laura Owens, Elizabeth Iannaci, Bob Craft, Peter Schaff, Joseph Goodrich	
1990	Art and Design Center at Cal State Northridge	Salsa Opera	Alan Bolt	Miguel Delgado (director/choreographer)		
1990	Art and Design Center at Cal State Northridge	Brick Time Stories: Tales of Death And Recipes Of Mayhem	Leon Martell	Darrell Larson	Leon Martell	
1991	Art and Design Center at Cal State Northridge	Fetters	Robert Hummer	Robert Hummer	Robert Fieldsteel, Gill Gayle, Greg Suddeth	
1991	Art and Design Center at Cal State Northridge	Song of Songs	Susan Champagne	Susan Champagne	Steve Starosta, Deborach Offner, Paul Grecol	
1991	Art and Design Center at Cal State Northridge	The Tight Fit	Susan Mosakowski	Susan Mosakowski	Tina Preston, Lee Kissman, Bert Hinchman, Molly Cleator	
1991	Art and Design Center at Cal State Northridge	The Knee Desires the Dirt	Julie Hebert	Julie Hebert	Jan-Marie Baldwin, Pamela Gordon, Kenn Norman	
1991	Art and Design Center at Cal State Northridge	The Interpreter of Horror	Kelly Stuart	James Oseland	Pamela Gordon, Megan Butler, James Oseland	
1991	Art and Design Center at Cal State Northridge	Heads	Murray Mednick	Steve Albrezzi	William Dennis Hunt, Norbert Weisser, Nancy Mette, Karole Foreman, Eugenia Buerklin (as Gina LaMond)	
1991	Art and Design Center at Cal State Northridge	The Promotion	John O'Keefe	John O'Keefe	Scott Paulin	
1994	Art and Design Center at Cal State Northridge	Failure to Thrive	Neena Beber	Neena Beber	Michael Shamus Wiles, Jessica Hecht, Kara Westerman	
1994	Art and Design Center at Cal State Northridge	Disgrace	John O'Keefe	John O'Keefe	Denise Porier, Dahlia Wilde, Susan Van Allen	
1994	Art and Design Center at Cal State Northridge	Terra Incognita	María Irene Fornés	María Irene Fornés	[Kimberly Flynn, Jennifer Griffin, Leo Garcia, Leon Martell, Joel Goodman	
1994	Art and Design Center at Cal State Northridge	Understanding the Dead	John Steppling	John Steppling	Mick Collins, John O’Keefe, Shelly Desai, Priscilla Harris, Kathleen Cramer, C.J. Saunders	
1994	Art and Design Center at Cal State Northridge	Locofoco	Susan Mosakowski	Susan Mosakowski	Shawna Casey, Tina Preston, Molly Cleator, Pamela Gordon	
1994	Art and Design Center at Cal State Northridge	Switchback	Murray Mednick	Murray Mednick	Sharron Shayne-Simeone, Robin Karfo, Mark Fite	
1994	Art and Design Center at Cal State Northridge	Justice	Shem Bitterman	Shem Bitterman	Jerome Butler, Preston Maybank, Brent Jennings, Peter Berg, Penny Johnson, Caitlin Stansbury	
1994	Art and Design Center at Cal State Northridge	Away From Me	Susan Champagne	Susan Champagne	Eugenia Buerklin (as Gina LaMond), Carl J. Johnson, Steven Keyes, Ed Dloughy, Cherly Slean, Durrell Nelson	
1995	USC	Summer in Gossensass	María Irene Fornés	María Irene Fornés	Michael Shamus Wiles, Jessica Hecht, Kara Westerman	
1995	USC	Demonology	Kelly Stuart	Kelly Stuart	Bob Gould, Lola Glaudini, Kathleen Glaudini, Jan Johnson	
1995	USC	Entrevista 187	Gil Kofman	Gil Kofman	Kadina Delejalde, Frank Wood, Jeff Phillips	
1995	USC	The Chemistry of Change	Marlane Meyer	Marlane Meyer	Kathleen Cramer, Van Quattro, Dendrie Taylor, Steve Keyes, Mark Fite, Ryan Cutrona	
1995	USC	Freeze	Murray Mednick	Guy Zimmerman	Amy Raasch, Denise Poirier, David Weininger, Antoinette Valente, Michael Matthys	
1995	USC	Steak Knife Bacchae	Joe Goodrich	Michael Hacker	Joe Goodrich	

== Selected Productions, 2001–Present ==
Season	Location	Title	Writer	Director	Cast	Awards
2001–2002	2100 Square Ft Theatre, Los Angeles	16 Routines	Murray Mednick	Murray Mednick	Grace Zabriskie, Rene Assa, Maria O'Brien, Bill Mesnick, Ryan Cutrona, Peggy Blow, Tina Preston, John Pappas	
2001–2002	2100 Square Ft Theatre, Los Angeles	Joe and Betty	Murray Mednick	Murray Mednick	Annabelle Gurwitch, John Diehl, Dana Wieluns, Jack Kehler, Shawna Casey, Sharron Shayne, Drago Sumonja	Winner Critics Choice, LA Times; Los Angeles Times “Top 10 for 2001”; American Theatre Critics’Association Steinberg New Play Citation
2001–2002	2100 Square Ft Theatre, Los Angeles	Mrs. Feuerstein	Murray Mednick	Roxanne Rogers	Maria O'Brien, Christopher Allport, Lynnda Ferguson, Louis Plante, Matt Blair, Gwendolyn Yeo	Winner Critics Choice, LA Times; LA Weekly Award for Playwriting and Best Actress. LA Weekly “Top 10 for 2001” (Steven Leigh Morris) 2001 Los Angeles Drama Critics’ Circle Award Best Lead Actress Maria O’Brien
2002–2003	Evidence Room, Los Angeles	Dog Mouth	John Steppling	John Steppling	Steven Davies, James Storm, Hugh Dane, Nia Gwyne	Winner Critic's Choice LA Times, Top Ten Shows of 2003 Daily News and Entertainment Weekly; LA Weekly Award for Set Design.
2002–2003	2100 Square Ft Theater, Los Angeles. Production moved to The Odyssey Theatre, Los Angeles and then the Traveling Jewish Theatre, San Francisco.	Times Like These	John O'Keefe	John O'Keefe	Laurie O'Brian, Norbert Weisser	Winner Critic's Choice LA Times, Ovation Awards for best Actor and Actress; LA Weekly Best Playwright and Best Playwright LA Drama Critics Circle
2002–2003	2100 Square Ft Theater, Los Angeles	Wilfredo	Wesley Walker	Wesley Walker	John Horn, Christine Burke, George Gerdes, O-Lan Jones, Jack Kehler, Barry Del Sherman	Curtainup.com “2002 Retrospective Top 10 List”
2002–2003	Mark Taper Forum, Los Angeles	Wilfredo	Wesley Walker	Wesley Walker	John Horn, Christine Burke, George Gerdes, O-Lan Jones, Jack Kehler, Barry Del Sherman	Curtainup.com “2002 Retrospective Top 10 List”
2003–2004	The Powerhouse Theatre, Santa Monica	G-Nome	Murray Mednick	Guy Zimmerman	Murray Mednick, Christopher Allport, Lynnda Ferguson	Winner of Garland Award for Playwriting and Direction
2003–2004	2100 Square Ft Theater, Los Angeles	The Inside Job	Guy Zimmerman	Guy Zimmerman	Barry Del Sherman, Jessica Dean, Holly Ramos	
2005–2006	Electric Lodge, Venice, CA	Tirade for Three, Gary's Walk, Girl on a Bed	Murray Mednick	Guy Zimmerman	John Diehl, Christopher Allport, Hugh Dane, Niamh McCormally, Don Preston, Don Berman, Dana Wieluns, Shawna Casey, Jack Kehler, Andy Hopper, Mickey Swenson, Tom McCleister, David Carrera, Shannon Holt, Gray Palmer, Devon Carson	2 Ovation Award Nominations: World Premiere Play(s) LA Weekly Award Nomination: Best Ensemble LA Weekly Award Nomination: Comedy Performance, Shawna Casey
2005–2006	Elephant Stageworks, Los Angeles, CA	In the Cool Dark: An Evening of Short Plays	Shawna Casey, Jack Kehler, Sharon Yablon, Wesley Walker, Guy Zimmerman	Shawna Casey, Jack Kehler, Sharon Yablon, Wes Walker, Guy Zimmerman	Shawna Casey, John Horn, Dana Wieluns, Tamar Fortgang, Gill Gayle, Sarah Diehl, Kim Debus, Mary C. Greening, Mari Ueda, Andy Hopper, Gray Palmer, Annie Weirich, Niamh McCormally	
2005–2006	Electric Lodge, Venice, CA	Vagrant	Guy Zimmerman	Guy Zimmerman	Christopher Allport, Patrick Burleigh, Niamh McCormally	
2005–2006	Edinburgh Fringe Festival 2006, Zoo Southside, Edinburgh, Scotland, UK	Vagrant, Tirade for Three	Guy Zimmerman, Murray Mednick	Guy Zimmerman	Christopher Allport, Shawna Casey, Andy Hopper, Jack Kehler, Niamh McCormally.	
2005–2006	Lost Studio, Los Angeles	Out of the Blue	Murray Mednick	Guy Zimmerman	Tina Preston, Hugh Dane, Lee Kissman, Andy Hopper, Niamh McCormally, Gray Palmer, Mary C. Greening, Mark Adair-Rios	
2005–2006	Bedlum, Los Angeles	Farm: 5 ten minute plays and a dance in a loft downtown	Sheryl Slean, Coleman Hough, Hank Bunker, Sharon Yablon, Guy Zimmerman	Sheryl Slean, Coleman Hough, Hank Bunker, Sharon Yablon, Guy Zimmerman	Katie Bachler, Madeline Baugh, Kim Debus, Edward Felix, Lake Sharp, Devon Carson, Hugh Dane, Mark Adair-Rios, Mary C. Greening, Betsy Hume, George Gerdes, Gill Gayle, Andy Hopper, Mickey Swenson, David Weininger, Megan Yellott, Trace Turville-Konerko, Christine Romeo, Niamh McCormally	
2007	Stephanie Feury Studio Theater, Los Angeles	The Empty Bed	Sharon Yablon	Sharon Yablon	Shawna Casey, Jack Kehler	
2007	Stephanie Feury Studio Theater, Los Angeles	A New World War	Rita Valencia	Guy Zimmerman	Andy Hopper, Jack Littman, Niamh McCormally, Gray Palmer, Devon Carson	
2007	Bootleg, Los Angeles and Divadlo na Pradle, Prague Fringe Festival 2007	The Fever	Wallace Shawn	Guy Zimmerman	Paul Mackley	
2008	Art Share	A Thousand Words				
2009	Art Share	Neo-Sacred Revival				
2009	Art Share	Clown Show for Bruno	Murray Mednick	Guy Zimmerman	Daniel Stein, Dana Wieluns, Kali Quinn, Bill Celentano	
2009	Art Share	Destruction of the Fourth World	Murray Mednick	Brian Frette and Kristi Schultz of Zoo District		
2010	LADAD Space	Hotel Bardo(t)	Heidi Darchuk	Guy Zimmerman		
2017	Bootleg Theater	Mr Job	Juli Crockett	Juli Crockett	Shaughn Buchholz, Gray Palmer, Jenny Greer, Brian Tichnell, Kenneth Breese	
2018	Resident Bar, MorYork	Jack Benny	Juli Crockett, Gray Palmer, Guy Zimmerman	Juli Crockett	Shaughn Buchholz, Jenny Greer, Gray Palmer, Juli Crockett, Brian Tichnell	
