= John Diehl =

American actor (born 1950)

- Born: John Henry Diehl; May 1, 1950 (age 76); Cincinnati, Ohio, U.S.
- Occupation: Actor
- Years active: 1980–present
- Spouse: Julie Christensen (m. 1992)
- Children: 1

John Henry Diehl (born May 1, 1950) is an American character actor. Noted for his work in avant garde theater, Diehl has performed in more than 140 films and television shows, including Land of Plenty, Stripes, City Limits, Nixon, Jurassic Park III, and the TV series Miami Vice, The Shield, and Point Pleasant.

Diehl has largely avoided the typecasting that is an accepted part of most character actors' careers. He has been a member of The Actors Studio since 2004.

== Early life ==
Diehl was born in Cincinnati, Ohio, in 1950. His father, John A. Diehl, was a civil engineer, and his mother, Mary, was a social worker. Raised in a devoutly Roman Catholic family, he was educated at parochial schools, and graduated from St. Xavier High School in 1968.

== Career ==
In 1970, Diehl moved to New York City, encouraged by his sister, who had just graduated from the Neighborhood Playhouse School of the Theatre. He spent 1971 squatting in Amsterdam and returned to New York City in 1972. In 1976, he moved to Los Angeles. He had always been interested in drawing and making things, and intended to pursue a career in the visual arts there. Initially, he supported himself in Los Angeles by moving furniture and objets d'art.

Although he had no previous experience as an actor, Diehl's interest turned to acting after he arrived in Los Angeles. He took a three-hour scene-studies class in Hollywood twice a week, and in 1979, he was cast in Action, a one act play written by Sam Shepard. In 1980, he became an acting member of Murray Mednick's Padua Hills Playwrights Festival, an annual event that brought young playwrights from throughout the United States together to live and work with such playwrights as Mednick, Shepard, Maria Irene Fornes, John O’Keefe, John Steppling, and Robert Glaudini. Diehl worked with all of the playwrights in residence over the course of his several years as an acting member of the festival.

Diehl's first significant film role was in the 1981 movie Stripes. In the 25th Anniversary DVD release of Stripes, John Laroquette compared the improvisation of John Candy and Diehl to the improvisation of Stan Laurel and Oliver Hardy. In 1983, Diehl appeared in National Lampoon's Vacation, directed by Diehl's Stripes co-star Harold Ramis.

In 1984, Diehl was cast as Detective Larry Zito in Miami Vice. Diehl found the role unfulfilling, and decided to leave. On January 9, 1987 — the 57th episode of Miami Vice — Diehl made his last appearance in a two-part episode, "Down for the Count", in which his character was killed off.

Diehl moved into a basement apartment in Greenwich Village in New York City, and despite a drastic reduction in his income, he declined television roles, and chose, instead, to continue working in film while pursuing a serious stage career. He subsequently appeared in The Hanoi Hilton (1987), a film about the experiences of American prisoners of war in Hanoi in the 1960s to '70s, and Alex Cox's Walker (1987), which was shot in Nicaragua during the Contra War. In late 1988, Diehl relocated to Los Angeles after he was cast in Sam Shepard's A Lie of the Mind at the Mark Taper Forum.

He continued to work in theater in New York City, however, and frequently returned to the stage there, most notably for a Shepard play at the Public Theater with Shepard in residence at the Signature, and Mednick's Joe and Betty, which was produced twice on Theater Row there.

In 1997, Diehl reprised his role in Action at the Public Theater, and in 2005, he worked once again with Padua Playwrights, appearing in two plays in Mednick's Gary Trilogy. Among others, his theater credits include Life of Mine, (with Holly Hunter) at the Mark Taper Forum, Samuel Beckett's Endgame, and Happy Days, one of three plays which Diehl directed.

He has appeared in more than 140 films, including Joysticks (1983), Angel (1984), City Limits (1984), Madhouse (1990), The Dark Side of the Moon (1990), Kickboxer 2 (1991), Mikey (1992), Mo' Money (1992), Gettysburg (1993), The Client (1994), Stargate (1994), The New Age (1994), Mind Ripper (1995), A Time to Kill (1996), Pearl Harbor (2001), and Road to Nowhere (2010).

Diehl played G. Gordon Liddy in Oliver Stone's Nixon (1995); the real-life Liddy had guest-starred in Miami Vice when Diehl was a regular on the show. Diehl also played the mercenary Cooper in Jurassic Park III (2001) and had recurring roles on The Shield, Friday Night Lights, The West Wing, and The John Larroquette Show. In 2000, he appeared in Fail Safe, which aired live on television. Between 2002 and 2004, he portrayed General Motors' Harley Earl in a series of television commercials for Buick. The commercials were directed by Tony Scott, who had previously directed films including Top Gun and Crimson Tide.

In 2004, Wim Wenders cast Diehl as the male lead in Land of Plenty, a film about post 9/11 American life. Shot on digital video in 16 days, the film centered on Diehl's character, Paul, a troubled Vietnam veteran, and his niece, played by Michelle Williams. In a New York Times review of the film, A.O. Scott wrote that Diehl gave a "wry, cunning performance, allowing glimmers of Paul's intelligence and decency to shine through even in his moments of high self-delusion."

A member of the Actors Studio since 2004, Diehl won the Los Angeles Times Warren Award in 2012, and in 2014 won the Southampton Film Festival's Lead Actor Award for his role in the short film Kahea.

== Personal life ==
Diehl and singer Julie Christensen were married in 1992. They relocated from Nashville, Tennessee, to Jemez Springs, New Mexico, in 2022 and have one son, Magnus Jackson Diehl.

He boxed as a middleweight in two professional matches (one win and one loss), and participated in several exhibition shows for charity.

== Filmography ==
=== Film ===
Year	Title	Role	Notes
1980	Falling in Love Again	"Beaver" (1940s)	
1981	Escape from New York	Punk	
1981	Stripes	Howard J. "Cruiser" Turkstra	
1983	Joysticks	Arnie	
1983	Hysterical	Taxi Driver	
1983	National Lampoon's Vacation	Assistant Mechanic	
1983	D.C. Cab	Head Kidnapper	
1984	Angel	The Killer	
1984	City Limits	"Whitey"	
1987	The Hanoi Hilton	Murphy	
1987	Walker	Strebbins	
1990	Madhouse	Fred Bannister	
1990	Cool Blue	Clayton	Direct-to-video
1990	The Dark Side of the Moon	Philip Jennings	
1991	Kickboxer 2: The Road Back	Jack	
1991	Whore	Derelict	
1991	A Climate for Killing	Wayne Paris	
1991	Motorama	Phil	
1991	Trumpet #7	Bud	
1992	Mikey	Neil Trenton	
1992	The Paint Job	Father	
1992	Mo' Money	Keith Heading	
1993	Falling Down	Dad, Back Yard Party	
1993	Remote	Delbert McCoy	Direct-to-video
1993	Gettysburg	Private Bucklin	
1994	Almost Dead	Eddie Herbek	
1994	The Client	Jack Nance	
1994	The New Age	Lyle	
1994	Stargate	Lieutenant Colonel Charles Kawalsky	
1995	Mind Ripper	Alex Hunter	
1995	Three Wishes	Leland's Father	
1995	Nixon	Gordon Liddy	
1996	Female Perversions	Jake Rock	
1996	The Grave	J.C. Cole	
1996	The Destiny of Marty Fine	Deke	
1996	Color of a Brisk and Leaping Day	Pinchot	
1996	A Time to Kill	Tim "Mickey Mouse" Nunley	
1996	Foxfire	Mr. Buttinger	
1997	Casualties	Polito	
1997	Managua	Unknown	
1997	The End of Violence	Lowell Lewis	
1997	Con Air	Public Defender	Uncredited
1997	Fire Down Below	EPA Agent Frank Elkins	
1997	Most Wanted	SWAT Captain	
1998	Monument Ave.	"Digger"	
1998	The Hi-Lo Country	Les Birk	
1998	Davis Is Dead	The Killer	
1999	Anywhere But Here	Jimmy	
1999	Swap Meet	Unknown	
2000	Tully	Mal "Mac" MacAvoy	
2000	Lost Souls	Henry Birdson	
2001	The Zeros	Burl	
2001	Pearl Harbor	Senior Doctor	
2001	Jurassic Park III	Cooper	
2001	Falling Like This	Eddie Gallagher	Also co-producer
2003	Bookies	Vincent	
2003	Out of Our Hands	Victor "Vic"	Short film
2003	Just Another Story	Al	
2004	Pass for Human	Ex-Husband	
2004	Land of Plenty	Paul	
2005	Down in the Valley	Steve	
2006	The House Is Burning	Mr. Garson	
2006	The Far Side of Jericho	Cash Thornton	
2006	Running Out of Time in Hollywood	Unknown	
2008	The Lucky Ones	Tom Klinger	
2008	Natural Disasters	John	
2009	Follow the Prophet	Ted	
2009	Gary's Walk	Gary	
2009	Drifter: Henry Lee Lucas	Sheriff Larabie	
2009	My Happy Faces	Dr. M.	Short film
2010	Road to Nowhere	Bobby Billings	
2011	Natural Selection	Abe	
2012	Swerve	Samm	Direct-to-video
2012	The Obama Effect	Steve Warren	
2012	Gabe the Cupid Dog	Roger	
2012	Apartment 1303 3D	Detective	
2012	Stillframe	Father	Short film
2013	Singularity Principle	Jack Brenner	
2014	A Long Way Off	Mr. Abraham	
2014	Kahea	Jake Baldwin	Short film
2014	Sal and the Goon	William Truth	Short film
2014	Strong Collected Spirit	Marty Stock	
2015	Forever	Neil	
2016	The North Star	Master Anderson	
2019	Out of the Wild	Henry McBride	
2022	Armageddon Time	Fred Trump	
2025	Train Dreams	Billy	

=== Television ===
Year	Title	Role	Notes
1980	A Rumor of War	D.T.	Television miniseries
1980	A Cry for Love	Unknown	Television film
1981	Hill Street Blues	Tom	Episode: "Chipped Beef"
1982	The Ambush Murders	Ferguson	Television film
1983	Cagney & Lacey	Unknown	Episode: "The Grandest Jewel Thief of Them All"
1983	The Family Tree	The Intruder	Episode: "The Burglary"
1984	Hunter	Bank Robber	Episode: "Hunter"
1984–1987	Miami Vice	Detective Larry Zito	56 episodes
1988	Glitz	Teddy Magyk	Television film
1988	Monsters	Miles Magnus	Episode: "Pillow Talk"
1989	Beauty and the Beast	Vernon Toulane	Episode: "The Hollow Men"
1989	Falcon Crest	Gus Wallach	Episode: "The Price of Freedom"
1990	In the Heat of the Night	John Sevrance	Episode: "Triangle"
1992	Mann & Machine	Concierge	Episode: "Prototype"
1993	South of Sunset	Merlin	2 episodes
1994	L.A. Law	Tim / Kevin Delahanty	2 episodes
1994–1996	The John Larroquette Show	Chris	5 episodes
1995	The Marshall	Earl "The Beast" Lipscomb	Episode: "The Bounty Hunter"
1995	Buffalo Girls	General Custer	Television miniseries
1995	Amanda and the Alien	Colonel Rosencrans	Television film
1996	The Lazarus Man	Nat Pratchett	2 episodes
1996	Ruby Jean and Joe	Harris Johnson	Television film
1996	Profiler	Toby "The Wick" Wood	Episode: "Ring of Fire"
1996	ER	Johnson's Son	Episode: "Don't Ask, Don't Tell"
1997	Nash Bridges	Albert Foss	Episode: "The Counterfeiters"
1997	The Outer Limits	Joe	Episode: "The Revelations of 'Becka Paulson"
1998	The Pretender	Sheriff Delmont	Episode: "Red Rock Jarod"
1998	The Rat Pack	Joe DiMaggio	Television film
1999	Purgatory	"Badger" Britton	Television film
1999	The X-Files	Wilson Pinker Rawls	Episode: "Trevor"
1999	JAG	Jack Raglan	Episode: "Rouge"
2000	18 Wheels of Justice	Matt Curran	Episode: "Mr. Invisible"
2000	Get Real	Harris Forman	Episode: "Tough Love"
2000	Fail Safe	Colonel Cascio	Television film
2000–2002	The West Wing	Claypool	2 episodes
2001	Dead Last	Richard Stengler	Episode: "To Serve, with Love"
2002	NYPD Blue	Joe Brady	Episode: "Gypsy Woe's Me"
2002	The Guardian	Fortunato	Episode: "Sacrifice"
2002–2005	The Shield	Ben Gilroy	9 episodes
2003	Dragnet	Dr. Rupert Miles	Episode: "Sticks and Stones"
2003	Without a Trace	Doyle	Episode: "Revelations"
2003	Karen Sisco	Junior McLeod	Episode: "Nostalgia"
2005	Strong Medicine	Mr. Lawson	Episode: "Gunshot Wedding"
2005–2006	Point Pleasant	David Burke	7 episodes
2006	Hidden Places	Frank Wyatt	Television film
2006	Jesse Stone: Death in Paradise	Jerry Snyder	Television film
2007	Jericho	Governor Trader	Episode: "Black Jack"
2007	Cold Case	Isaac Keller	2 episodes
2007	Women's Murder Club	Paul Galvan	Episode: "The Past Comes Back to Haunt You"
2009	Mental	Hank Crowley	Episode: "Rainy Days"
2009	Friday Night Lights	Richard Sherman	2 episodes
2010	Lie to Me	Charlie Everett	Episode: "Veronica"
2011	Trichotomy	The Muse	Video short
2011	Burn Notice: The Fall of Sam Axe	Admiral James G. Lawrence	Television film
2011	Rizzoli & Isles	Arthur Dunbar	Episode: "My Own Worst Enemy"
2012	Scandal	Ray Dwyer	Episode: "The Other Woman"
2014	Almost Human	Edward Kennex	Episode: "Straw Man"
2019–2023	Snowfall	Colonel McDonald	3 episodes
2019	Castle Rock	John	Episode: "The Word"
2022–2023	Dark Winds	B.J. Vines	6 episodes
2022	Five Days at Memorial	Frank Minyard	2 episodes
