= John Steppling =

John Steppling may refer to:

- John Steppling (actor) (1870–1932), German-born American silent film actor
- John Steppling (playwright) (born 1951), American playwright and screenwriter
