= Murray Mednick =

American playwright and poet (1939–2025)

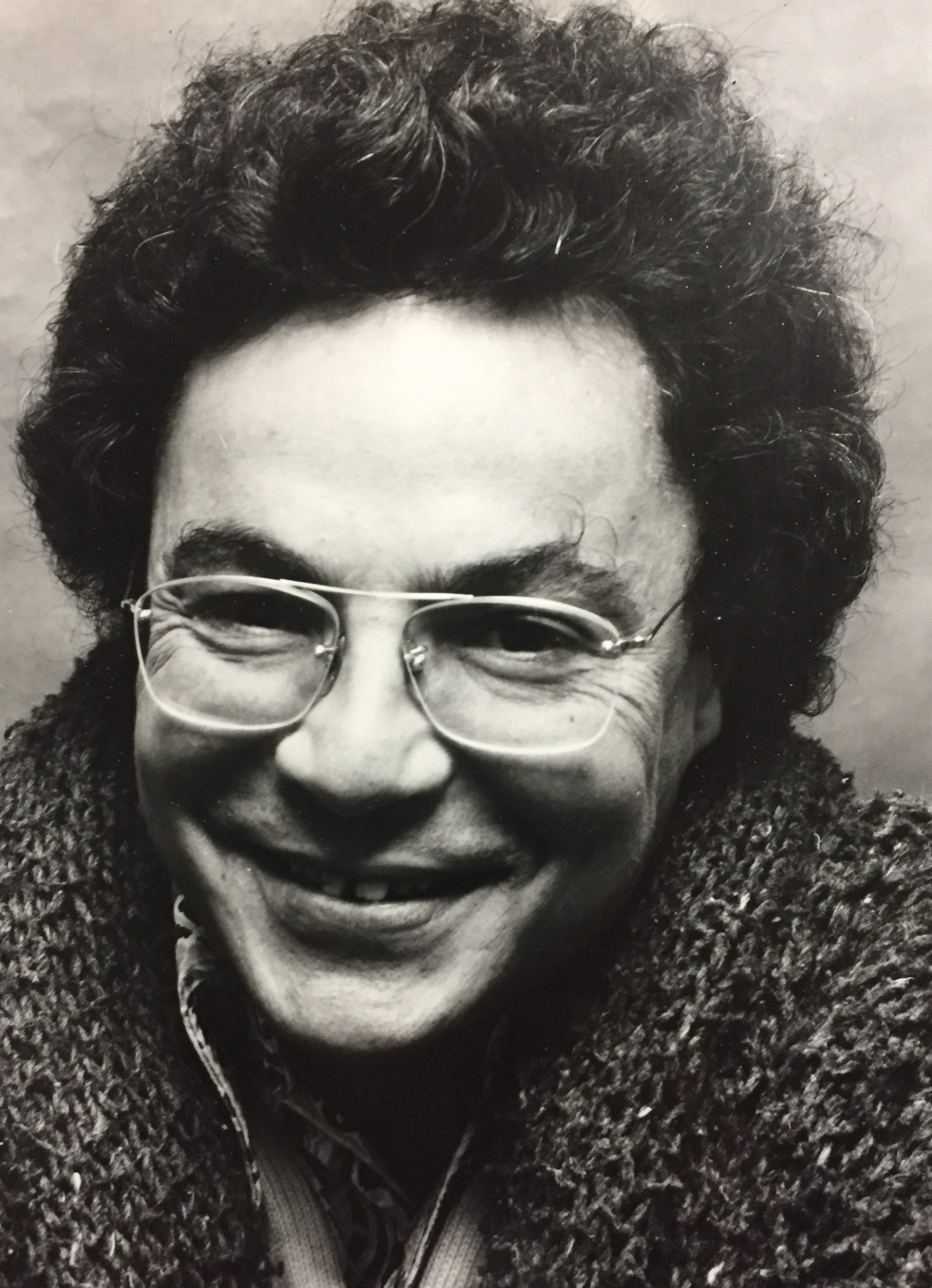
- Mednick in the 1960s
- Born: August 24, 1939; New York City, U.S.
- Died: October 17, 2025 (aged 86)
- Occupation: Playwright; poet; artistic director
- Years active: 1965–2025

Murray Maurice Mednick (August 24, 1939 – October 17, 2025) was an American playwright and poet. He is best known as founder of the Padua Hills Playwrights Workshop/Festival, where he served as artistic director from 1978 to 1995. Mednick received numerous awards for his plays, including two Rockefeller Grants and an Obie.

== Life and career ==
Born in 1939 to a family with Jewish roots, Mednick attended Brooklyn College and became involved with New York's off-off-Broadway company Theatre Genesis, where much of his early work was staged. He was eventually appointed to the post of artistic co-director in 1970. In 1974, Mednick moved to Los Angeles after being evicted from his apartment while on a trip to the Yucatán on a Guggenheim grant.

Mednick founded the long-running summer workshop Padua Hills Playwrights Workshop/Festival in 1978 with funding from LaVerne University, where he was teaching at the time. The workshop was meant to be an extension of his collaborations with Ralph Cook, his mentor and founder of Theatre Genesis. In his teachings at Padua, Mednick stressed a strong grounding in theater and literary history, specifically the Ancient Greeks, Shakespeare, and Beckett. Language was especially important. In a 2001 interview, Mednick said that Padua's teaching was "based in a literary knowledge, with a seriousness of purpose that isn't necessarily commercial. Both the writing and the acting are like realism-plus. Ordinary exchanges of life are put in an occasion that heightens them. The dialogue is really the action; it has a life of its own. The story is reflected by the dialogue." Notable participants in the Workshop/Festival included Maria Irene Fornes, Sam Shepard, John Steppling, John O'Keefe, Jon Robin Baitz, and Kelly Stuart".

Padua ceased operation in 1995 and reemerged in 2001, premiering three Mednick works as part of a tribute series honoring influential local playwrights.

Mednick has been mentioned as having influenced other playwrights, including Sam Shepard, Eduardo Machado, and David Scott Milton. Murray Mednick met Sam Shepard in 1965, they went on to start a band called "The Heavy Metal Kid." Murray Mednick directed Sam Shepard's play Action starring Patti Smith. Mednick and Shepard were a part of the Off-Off Broadway movement in New York City.

Mednick died on October 17, 2025, at the age of 86.

== Works ==
Mednick's later productions included Mayakovsky and Stalin, which premiered in Los Angeles starting in October 2018, and moved to the Cherry Lane Theatre in New York, 2019. The Gary Plays (8 separate works/ premiered in Los Angeles 2017), Villon (premiered in Los Angeles, 2014). Past productions include; Scar (starring actor Ed Harris), an autobiographical series 16 Routines, Joe and Betty (concerning his parents' difficult marriage, starring John Diehl and Annabel Gurwitch, which performed in New York starting in June 2002), and Mrs. Feuerstein, as well as Sand, The Hawk, Fedunn (produced by the Audrey Skirball-Kenis theatre), The Coyote Cycle, a series of one-act plays performed outdoors from twilight till dawn, involving four characters such as Spider Grandmother drawn from traditional Native American folklore. The Coyote character was also featured in Destruction of the Fourth World, part of the 2009 series performed by Padua Playwrights.

His published plays include Villon and other plays (2016), Hipsters in Distress (2005), Three Plays (2003), The Coyote Cycle (1993), by Padua Hills Press. His play Switchback was published in 1997 by (Sun and Moon Press). Anthologized plays include Freeze, The Deer Kill, Willie the Germ, The Hawk, Sand, Switchback, Taxes, and others.

== Awards and recognition ==
Mednick was the recipient of two Rockefeller Foundation grants, a Guggenheim Fellowship, an Obie (The Deer Kill), several Bay Area Critics Awards, two LA Weekly Playwriting Awards (for Dictator and Fedunn), the American Theater Critics Association/Steinberg New Play Citation (for Joe and Betty), an Ovation Lifetime Achievement Award from Theatre LA for outstanding contributions to Los Angeles Theatre, a Local Hero Garland Award from Back Stage West for a Distinguished Body of Work, a Career Achievement Award from the LA Weekly, and the Los Angeles Drama Critics Circle's most prestigious honor, the Margaret Harford Award for “Sustained Excellence in Theater.”

Productions
Title	Year	City
Sand	1968	NY
The Hawk	1969	NY
The Shadow Ripens	1969	San Diego
Willie The Germa	1970	NY
The Hunter	1970	NY
Are You Lookin	1972	NY
The Deer Kill	1972	NY
The Coyote Cycle	1978–1988	LA, San Francisco, Santa Fe, Yugoslavia
Scar	1977	Los Angeles
The Actors Delicatessen	1984	NY
Shatter' n Wade	1990	LA
Skinwalkers	1991	LA
Heads	1991	LA
Freeze	1995	LA
Baby, Jesus!	1996	LA
Switchback	1997	LA
Tirade for Three	1997	LA
Dictator	1997	LA
G-Nome	1997	LA
Joe and Betty	2001‍–‍2002	LA, NY, Tel Aviv
Mrs. Feuerstien	2001	LA, NY
16 Routines	2001	LA
Fedunn	2002	LA
Destruction of the 4th World	2004	LA
Gary's Walk	2005	LA
Girl On A Bed	2005	LA
Out of the Blue	2007	LA
Nightmare Audition	2008	LA
Charles Story	2009	LA
Daddy O Dies Well	2011	LA
The Fool and Red Queen	2011	LA
Villion	2014	LA
The Gary Play Series (7 plays)	2015–2017	LA
Mayakovsky and Stalin	2018–2019	LA, NY
