= David Scott Milton =

American author, playwright, screenwriter and actor (1934–2020)

David Scott Milton (September 15, 1934 – January 13, 2020) was an American author, playwright, screenwriter, and actor. His plays are known for their theatricality, wild humor, and poetic realism, while his novels and films are darker and more naturalistic. As a novelist, he has been compared to Graham Greene, John Steinbeck, and Nelson Algren. Ben Gazzara’s performance in Milton’s play, Duet, received a Tony nomination. Another play, Skin, won the Neil Simon Playwrights Award. His theater piece, Murderers Are My Life, was nominated as best one-man show by the Valley Theater League of Los Angeles. His second novel, Paradise Road, was given the Mark Twain Journal award "for significant contribution to American literature."

== Early years ==
Milton was born during the Great Depression to a working class Jewish family in Pittsburgh, Pennsylvania. His grandparents emigrated from a small village near Botoşani, Romania. His father, Si Milton, became a truck driver, then a yeast salesman, and eventually a bakery and restaurant owner. Milton's work as an apprentice baker contributed to his play, Bread, which debuted at The American Place Theater in New York and had a successful run at the Theater Dortmund in Dortmund, Germany. Duet which opened on Broadway in the mid-seventies also had productions in German at the Kreis Theater in Vienna, Austria. In the spring of 1996, it had its premiere in Germany at the Düsseldorfer Schauspielhaus. A new play, Catching a Cab, under the auspices of Gustav Kiepenheuer, had also been optioned for German production.

Milton was an early member of the avant-garde Theatre Genesis, along with Sam Shepard, Leonard Melfi and Murray Mednick. He has had more than a dozen plays performed Off-Off-Broadway including The Interrogation Room, Halloween Mask, The Metaphysical Cop, and Scraping Bottom. Scraping Bottom, under the title of Born to Win, became the Czech director Ivan Passer's first American film, and starred George Segal, Karen Black and Paula Prentiss. Pauline Kael has characterized this title change as perhaps the most extreme in the history of American cinema.

Other plays were Duet for Solo Voice and Bread at The American Place Theater and a revised version of Duet for Solo Voice, re-titled Duet, on Broadway with Ben Gazzara. Gazzara's performance earned him a Tony nomination.

In Los Angeles, Skin, for which Milton won the Neil Simon Playwrights Award, ran for nearly a year at The Odyssey Theater.

He has had six novels published: The Quarterback (Dell Publishing), Paradise Road (Atheneum), Kabbalah (Harcourt, Brace, Jovanovich), Skyline (G. P. Putnam's Sons), The Fat Lady Sings (iUniverse), and Iron City [White Whisker Books]. Paradise Road was given the Mark Twain Journal award "for significant contribution to American literature." His plays Duet and Skin are also in print.

Milton's short stories have appeared in The Southern California Anthology, The Pearl River Review, The Southern (Lafayette, Louisiana) Anthology, among others.

His adaptation of David Hare's Knuckle was seen on PBS television. Other television work includes a stint as story editor on Starsky and Hutch and scripts for the John Houseman syndicated show, Tales of the Unexpected.

He had written screenplays for directors, Peter Bogdanovich, Ivan Passer, Sidney Pollack, Dick Richards, and Irvin Kershner.

Since 1977, he had been a Senior Lecturer in Drama and adjunct professor in the Master of Professional Writing Program at the University of Southern California. He also taught screenwriting in the cinema department.

He had been a special lecturer at Goddard College and at CalArts, as well as consultant to the creative writing program at The University of South Alabama and literary consultant to Scott, Foresman Publishers, and Warner Books. He had conducted screenwriting seminars at the German Film and Television Academy in Berlin and the Duke University Film and Television Program. He was appointed to the advisory board of the Christopher Isherwood Foundation along with, among others, David Hockney, Michael York, John Schlesinger, and Armistead Maupin.

For thirteen years, until 2004, he ran a writers' workshop on the Maximum Security Yard of the California Correctional Institution at Tehachapi where his class consisted of a dozen murderers. He mounted a one-man show, “Murderers Are My Life”, based on his prison experiences which ran for four months at The Two Roads Theater in Studio City, CA. It was also seen at The Schoolhouse Theater in Croton Falls, New York and The Studio Theater in Manhattan. It received a nomination as best one-man show by the Valley Theater League of Los Angeles.

== Family ==
Milton married Sheila Kuester, an intensive care nurse, in 1981. They have two children, Abby and Kyle. They were divorced in 1991. David (Also known as Dave) died on January 13, 2020. He was 85 years old.

== Acting ==
Film: Born to Win, Rollercoaster, Mask, Ruby and Oswald, Billy Jack Goes to Washington.

Television: Hill Street Blues, Police Story, Starsky and Hutch, Nero Wolfe, Julie Farr, M.D., Kaz, Charlie's Angels, Vega$, and Strike Force.

Theater: New York—Gorky’s Lower Depths, Giraudoux’s Song of Songs (with Delphine Seyrig), Saroyan’s The Cave Dwellers, Shakespeare’s Measure for Measure (with Nina Foch). Stratford, Conn., the American Shakespeare Festival— King John (with Mildred Dunnock and Fritz Weaver), Measure for Measure (with Nina Foch), Taming of the Shrew (with Foch & Pernell Roberts), Othello (with Earl Hyman and Alfred Drake), The Merchant of Venice (with Katharine Hepburn and Morris Carnovsky) Much Ado About Nothing (Hepburn & Alfred Drake) National Tours—Much Ado About Nothing (with Katharine Hepburn and Alfred Drake); Lamp at Midnight (directed by Sir Tyrone Guthrie)

== Sources ==
Contemporary Authors Online. The Gale Group, 2002. PEN 0000069037.
