= Walter Hadler =

American playwright and theater director

Walter Hadler is an American playwright and theater director. Hadler was a resident playwright at Theatre Genesis during the 1960s, along with Murray Mednick, Sam Shepard, and Tony Barsha. Hadler and Mednick became co-directors of the theater in 1969, and Hadler continued to operate it from 1974 to 1978 following Mednick's departure.

Hadler later wrote and directed productions for Padua Playwrights, a Los Angeles theater company founded by Mednick.
