= Sarah Lovett =

Sarah Lovett may refer to:

- Sarah Lovett, sometimes identified as the name of Mrs. Lovett
- Sarah Lovett (playwright) in Padua Playwrights
