= Glenn Fitzgerald =

American actor

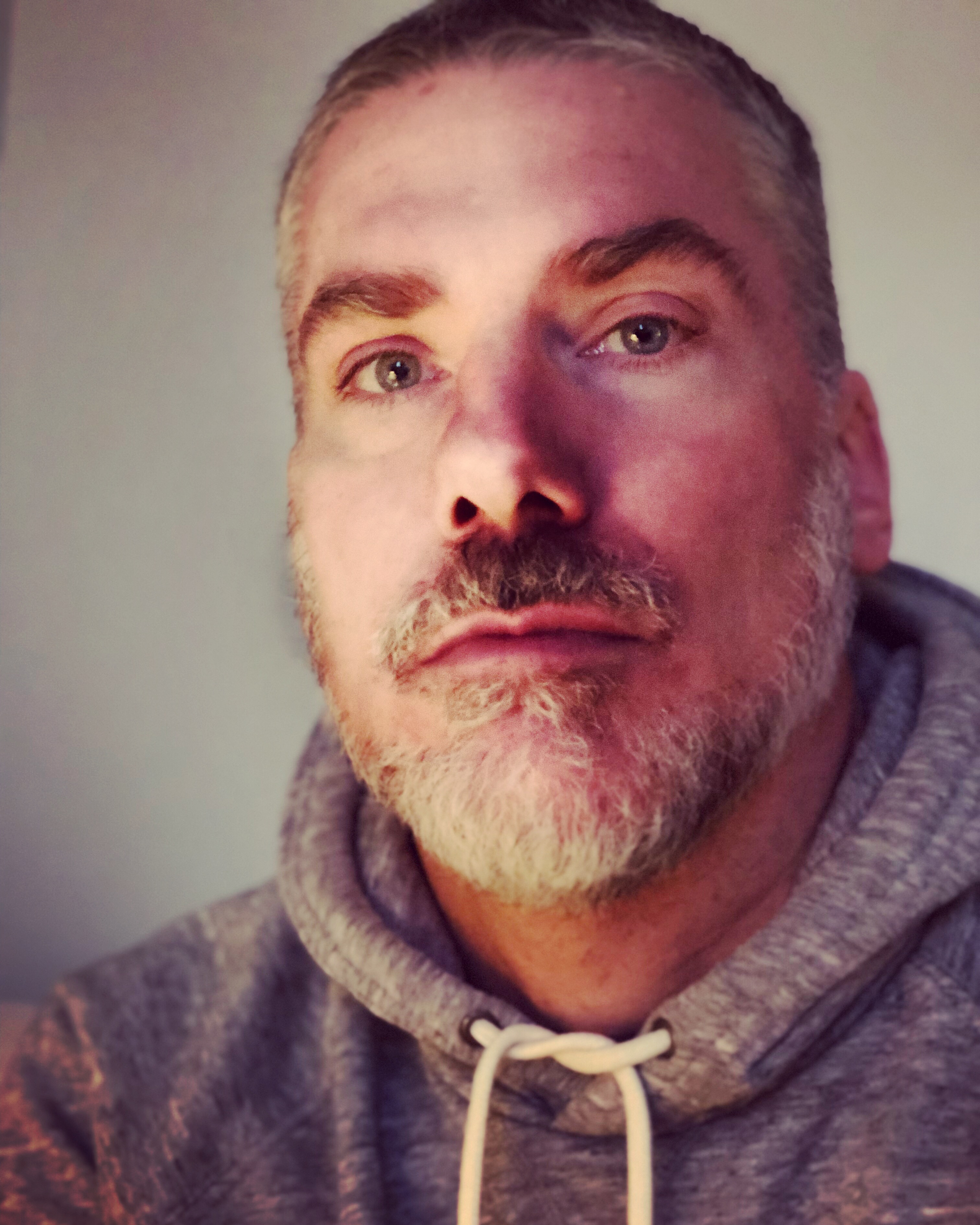
- Fitzgerald in 2019
- Born: December 21, 1971 (age 53); Brooklyn, New York, U.S.
- Occupation: Actor
- Years active: 1994–present

Glenn Fitzgerald (born December 21, 1971) is an American actor of stage, film, and television.

== Career ==
His film roles have included Homicide Detective Anderson in Kathryn Bigelow's Detroit; Lonnie, the son of Alan Alda and Lily Tomlin's characters in Flirting with Disaster; Neil, the boy at the "key party" that goes home with Sigourney Weaver's character in The Ice Storm; the Hasidic scholar husband of Renée Zellweger's character in A Price Above Rubies; the uptight assistant to Sean Connery's character in Gus Van Sant's Finding Forrester; and the earnest antique dealer in M. Night Shyamalan's The Sixth Sense. He has played diverse roles in several independent films, including a terminally ill pacifist forced to fight for his life in Series 7: The Contenders; a sociopathic skinhead opposite Ryan Gosling in The Believer; the sensitive, kind brother in Tully ; and the reckless, drug-addled tank commander opposite Joaquin Phoenix in Buffalo Soldiers.

Between film jobs, Fitzgerald built a stage career, originating roles in Jon Robin Baitz's Mizlansky/Zilinsky, opposite Nathan Lane and directed by Joe Mantello; Kenneth Lonergan's Lobby Hero (Lucille Lortel Award nomination for Outstanding Lead Actor); Will Eno's The Realistic Joneses with Tracy Letts and Parker Posey, directed by Sam Gold; Melissa James Gibson's THIS at Playwrights Horizons with Julianne Nicholson; David Lindsay-Abaire's Ripcord directed by David Hyde Pierce with Holland Taylor; and Sharr White’s The True with Edie Falco at The New Group.

He has appeared in innovative productions of classic plays such as Hedda Gabler at New York Theatre Workshop directed by Ivo van Hove; The Importance of Being Earnest at Williamstown Theatre Festival directed by David Hyde Pierce and starring Tyne Daly; Classic Stage Company's Ivanov and Hamlet directed by Austin Pendleton alongside Ethan Hawke and Peter Sarsgaard and Othello at New York Theatre Workshop directed by Sam Gold.

Television credits includes series regular Brian Darling on ABC's Dirty Sexy Money, and guest starring roles on Six Feet Under, Billions, Madam Secretary, Elementary, Law & Order, Law & Order: Criminal Intent, Homicide: Life on the Street, CSI: Miami and FBI: Most Wanted .

== Filmography ==
=== Film ===
Year	Title	Role	Notes
1996	Manny & Lo	Joey	
1996	Flirting with Disaster	Lonnie Schlichting	
1997	Rhinoceros Hunting in Budapest	Young Man	
1997	Arresting Gena	Man / Pimp	
1997	The Ice Storm	Neil Conrad	
1998	A Price Above Rubies	Mendel Horowitz	
1999	Judy Berlin	Tour Guide	
1999	The Sixth Sense	Sean	
2000	101 Ways (the Things a Girl Will Do to Keep Her Volvo)	Jack	
2000	Tully	Earl Coates	Also photographer
2000	Finding Forrester	Massie	
2001	The Believer	Drake	
2001	Series 7: The Contenders	Jeff	
2001	Buffalo Soldiers	Hicks	
2002	40 Days and 40 Nights	Chris	
2002	Igby Goes Down	Surfer Tommy	
2005	Bittersweet Place	Moshe	
2005	Trust the Man	Goren	
2005	Confess	Greg Lanser	
2006	The Memsahib	Captain Nelson Roberts	
2007	Lovely by Surprise	Customer #2	
2007	Neal Cassady	Jack Kerouac	
2017	Detroit	Homicide Detective Anderson	

=== Television ===
Year	Title	Role	Notes
1994	New York Undercover	Henrickson	Episode: "Sins of the Father"
1995	New York News	Scar	Episode: "New York News"
1995, 2001	Law & Order	Seth Teitel / Merril Grupp	2 episodes
1997	Homicide: Life on the Street	Jeff McGinn	Episode: "Diener"
2001	The Atlantis Conspiracy	Patient	Television film
2002	Six Feet Under	Aaron Buchbinder	3 episodes
2004	Law & Order: Criminal Intent	Spencer Farnell	Episode: "The Posthumous Collection"
2004	Wonderfalls	Bank Robber	Episode: "Caged Bird"
2007–2009	Dirty Sexy Money	Rev. Brian Darling	23 episodes
2010	CSI: Miami	Chip Ford	Episode: "Sudden Death"
2011	The Cape	Conrad Chandler / The Lich	2 episodes
2011	Drop Dead Diva	Nathan Persky	Episode: "Closure"
2012	Perception	Leo Attinger	Episode: "Light"
2013	Elementary	Linus Roe	Episode: "Solve for X"
2015	Madam Secretary	Reverend Wesley Finch	Episode: "The Time Is at Hand"
2016	Billions	Manager #3	Episode: "The Conversation"
2018	The Good Cop	Father Kokesh	2 episodes
2020	FBI: Most Wanted	Lt. Mike Peroni	Episode: "Ironbound"
