= A Price Above Rubies =

1998 film directed by Boaz Yakin

- Theatrical release poster
- Directed by: Boaz Yakin
- Written by: Boaz Yakin
- Produced by: Lawrence Bender; John Penotti
- Starring: Renée Zellweger; Christopher Eccleston; Allen Payne; Glenn Fitzgerald; Julianna Margulies
- Cinematography: Adam Holender
- Edited by: Arthur Coburn
- Music by: Lesley Barber
- Distributed by: Miramax Films
- Release date: January 22, 1998 (Sundance Film Festival)
- Running time: 117 minutes
- Countries: United Kingdom; United States
- Language: English
- Box office: $1,081,957

A Price Above Rubies is a 1998 British-American drama film written and directed by Boaz Yakin and starring Renée Zellweger. The story centers on a young woman who finds it difficult to conform to the restrictions imposed on her by her community. Reviews of the film itself were mixed, though there were generally positive reviews of Zellweger's performance.

The title derives from a Jewish Sabbath tradition. The acrostic Sabbath chant The Woman of Valor (eishet chayil) begins with the verse "... Who can find a woman of valor, her price is far above rubies ... ," which in turn is excerpted from The Book of Proverbs. This chant traditionally is a prelude to the weekly toast (kiddush) which begins the Sabbath meal.

== Plot ==
Sonia is a young Brooklyn woman who has just given birth to her first child. She is married, through an arranged marriage, to Mendel, a devout Hasidic Jew who is too repressed and immersed in his studies to give his wife the attention she craves. He even condemns her for making sounds during sex and considers nudity with sex "indecent".

Sonia is distressed and later, after a panic attack, she tries to kiss her sister-in-law Rachel. Rachel persuades her to talk to the Rebbe but Sonia cannot truly articulate what is upsetting her, instead resorting to a metaphor of a fire burning her up.

Sonia develops a relationship with Sender, who brings her into his jewellery business. Her husband forgets her birthday and Sonia says she longs for something beautiful in her life - even if it is a terrible beauty. Sender is the only release for Sonia's sexuality but she is repelled by his utter lack of morals. He is also abrupt and self-centred in his seductions, never waiting for Sonia to achieve orgasm.

Sonia sometimes sees and hears her brother. He appears as a child and judges her actions. On one occasion she buys a non-kosher egg roll whilst in Chinatown and her brother tells her off and an elderly street beggar-woman sees him and offers him candy. She comments on another woman's earrings and this leads Sonia to track down the maker of a ring she had discovered earlier that day.

The maker is Puerto Rican artist and jewellery designer Ramon, who works as a salesperson in the jewellery quarter but keeps his artistry a secret from everyone in the business.

Later Sonia's husband tells her she cannot continue to work. She is furious. Her husband insists they see a marriage counsellor (their rabbi) but the man decides Sonia is not being a good enough Jew. She says she is tired of being afraid and if she is so offensive to God then 'let him do what he wants to me.' The counsellor says we bring suffering upon ourselves but Sonia protests that her relatives who were murdered in the Holocaust and her brother who died when he was ten did not deserve their suffering. The counsellor says that 'we' do not question the ways of God but Sonia corrects this to 'you' and asserts that she will question whatever she wants to.

Sonia stops wearing her wig and starts wearing a headscarf instead. She introduces Ramon and some samples to a jewellery buyer who expresses an interest in his potential as a designer. They argue at Ramon's flat as she becomes bossy over his career, and he tries to get her to model (clothed) with a naked male model so he can complete a sculpture. She runs away.

Sonia's marriage breaks down irrevocably. Sonia is locked out of her apartment, and finds that her son has been given to Rachel. She is told she may live in a tiny apartment owned by Sender and kept for 'business purposes'. When she arrives, Sender is eating at a table and it is clear he has set her up as his mistress when she asks what the price is to stay: he says above that of emeralds but below the price of rubies. This is 'freedom'. Sonia hands him back the keys and leaves.

None of her friends will take her phone calls and Sonia is homeless. She meets the beggar-woman on the street and is taken to an empty studio and given food. The woman refers to an old legend (one her brother spoke of at the start of the film), to encourage Sonia. Meantime, Mendel takes back his son - for nights only. Rachel protests but he says he would appreciate her caring for his son during the day when he is studying.

Sonia now goes to Ramon's place and he lets her stay. She says he was right to be wary of her when they met as she has destroyed every good thing she had. But Ramon disagrees, removes her jewellery, and points out that her necklace is 'a chain'. (It is unclear if the necklace is of religious significance or if he means the need to have financial security through jewellery is a chain or restriction). The two end up kissing.

Sonia dreams her brother returns from the lake to say he swam, and she - as her childhood self - says she swam too. When she wakes up in Ramon's bed there is a prominent crucifix on the wall. Sonia goes to speak to the widow of the Rebbe. The widow tells her that Sonia's words about being consumed by fire had awoken a fire in the Rebbe and for the first time in 20 years he had said 'I love you.' It is implied that they had sex and the Rebbe had a heart attack. The widow is not unhappy with this outcome. She assists Sonia in reclaiming property from Sender's safe.

With Ramon's ring back in her keeping she returns it to Ramon. She doesn't want to stay as she does not feel she belongs. Ramon offers her time to think about what she wants.

Mendel arrives. Sonia asks after her son and then if Mendel misses her. He shakes his head. He asks the same of her and she shakes her head. They laugh. He apologises for forgetting her birthday but he knows that this was not all it was about. He gives her a ruby as token of his regret and invites her to visit their son.

Mendel leaves and Sonia says, 'God bless you'.

== Cast ==
- Renée Zellweger as Sonia Horowitz
- Christopher Eccleston as Sender Horowitz
- Julianna Margulies as Rachel
- Allen Payne as Ramon Garcia
- Glenn Fitzgerald as Mendel Horowitz
- Shelton Dane as Yossi
- Kim Hunter as Rebbetzin
- John Randolph as Rebbe Moshe
- Kathleen Chalfant as Beggar Woman
- Peter Jacobson as Schmuel
- Edie Falco as Feiga
- Allen Swift as Mr. Fishbein

== Production ==
It was shot in Brooklyn during 1997. Entertainment Weekly reported that a group of onlookers, upset over the film's depiction of Judaism, got in the way of shooting one day. The producers faced backlash for casting Zellweger, who is not Jewish, in the lead role. Director Boaz Yakin remarked: "Zellweger was the best actor for the part. She is an actor. The Jews that worked on this film knew less about the Hasidic lifestyle than Renee did after reading 10 books about it. So, being a Jew doesn't qualify you to act the part any more than any other thing. It was more important for each actor and actress to find the emotional light of their character and learn to wear it like a second skin."

== Reception ==
On the review aggregator website Rotten Tomatoes, 59% of 29 critics' reviews are positive.

Roger Ebert of Chicago Sun-Times gave the movie three stars. While impressed by Zellweger's "ferociously strong performance", he found the film did not teach us "much about her society", and that the Hasidic community could have been treated in greater depth. Charles Taylor of Salon likewise appreciated Zellweger's performance, while also finding the cultural aspect treated too superficially. He described Sonia's choices as "clichés left over from the Liberated Woman movies of 20 years ago", and the movie generally as "that old middle-of-the-road groaner about the good and bad in every race". Maria Garcia of Film Journal International was more positively inclined to the movie, and called it a "beautifully wrought, skillfully rendered, and brilliantly acted film".

== Home media ==
The Walt Disney Company's home video arm Buena Vista Home Entertainment released the film on VHS on September 15, 1998, with a DVD following on January 18, 2000. The 2000 DVD was released under Miramax's "Miramax Classics" line.

In 2010, Miramax was sold by The Walt Disney Company (their owners since 1993), with the studio being taken over by private equity firm Filmyard Holdings that same year. Filmyard licensed the home video rights for several Miramax titles to Echo Bridge Entertainment, and on January 10, 2012, Echo Bridge reissued A Price Above Rubies on DVD. In 2011, Filmyard also licensed the Miramax library to streamer Netflix. This deal included A Price Above Rubies, and ran for five years, eventually ending on June 1, 2016.

Filmyard Holdings sold Miramax to Qatari company beIN Media Group during March 2016. In April 2020, ViacomCBS (now known as Paramount Skydance) acquired the rights to Miramax's library, after buying a 49% stake in the studio from beIN. A Price Above Rubies was one of the 700 titles Paramount acquired in the deal. Paramount Home Entertainment reissued the film on DVD on June 15, 2021, with this being one of many Miramax titles that they reissued around this time.
