= Shimmer (play) =

1988 play by John O'Keefe

Shimmer is a 1988 award-winning one-man play by American playwright John O'Keefe. It is a solo performance, portraying multiple characters, that describes life on a harsh juvenile detention farm in the Midwest in the 1950s.

== Plot ==
The solo actor in Shimmer tells the story by becoming each character in turn. The play takes place in 1956, in a harsh Midwestern juvenile detention center, where two boys befriend each other. To survive the brutal environment, the two create their own fantasy world, in which the movement of streams and breezes becomes a language that travels between dimensions, a language the boys call "shimmer." The two boys are eventually locked up, and they are ultimately forced to carefully plan and carry out an escape.

== Background ==
O'Keefe wrote Shimmer after financial restrictions ended his plans for a five-actor play that had been commissioned, by American Inroads in San Francisco, in 1987. O'Keefe then asked if he could do a solo play, and the proposal was accepted. "It was a lot more money with one guy, and I just used lights and a music stand," says O'Keefe. "I wanted to keep the overhead next to zip."

O'Keefe based the play partly on his own experiences growing up in Midwestern juvenile detention centers. O'Keefe, who was born in Iowa, was first sent to live in juvenile detention homes at the age of 7, after his mother was declared unfit to care for him. For the next nine years, he was shuttled among eight foster homes, nine juvenile detention homes, and five orphanages in 20 states. The end of Shimmer describes how he and his best friend escaped from the last of the juvenile detention centers.

"Shimmer is not strictly autobiographical," O'Keefe says. "Though the characters themselves are real, the [detention] farm was a much more brutal place than I portray it."

== Performance and reception ==
Shimmer was first performed, by playwright O'Keefe, in 1988 in San Francisco. O'Keefe subsequently performed the solo piece all over the country, including Off-Off Broadway in New York City at Performance Space 122 beginning January 1989, and Off-Broadway at the Second Stage Theatre from July 10, 1989, to August 13, 1989.

The play has received very positive reviews. The New York Times called it "rivetingly kinetic." "Gliding and shadowboxing around the stage, Mr. O'Keefe physically re-enacts fights and confrontations with an edgy ferocity that feels so spontaneous one can almost forget the fact that [it] ... has been carefully rehearsed. And at key emotional moments, Mr. O'Keefe's speaking voice shades into song.... [This] is bravura storytelling that etches itself on the mind."

The San Francisco Chronicle called the show "ravishing, heart-breaking" and "a solo-theater classic." "... O'Keefe plays second to no one in the transforming magic of the solo stage. Shimmer fuses language, voice, gesture and action in a rush of feeling. With an eerie intuitive power, the show captures the strangeness and sensuality, the loneliness and precious consolations of growing up afraid."

Shimmer was published in 1989. The one-man play has subsequently been performed across the U.S. and around the world.

== Film ==
O'Keefe also adapted Shimmer into a screenplay with multiple characters, and it was made into an independent film by American Playhouse in 1993, as the true story of a friendship between two boys from a juvenile home. The film aired on PBS on April 15, 1995.

== Awards ==
- 1988 Glickman Award for Best Original Play
- 1989 Bay Area Drama Critics' Circle Award for Solo Performance
- 1989 Bessie Award (New York Dance and Performance Award) for Choreographer/Creator
- 1992 California Arts Council Fellowship for the Shimmer screenplay

== Sources ==
- John O'Keefe – Awards and Prizes
