= Staten Island (film) =

- Film poster
- Directed by: James DeMonaco
- Written by: James DeMonaco
- Produced by: Luc Besson; Pascal Cauchetaux; Sebastien Lemercier; Pierre-Ange Le Pogam
- Starring: Ethan Hawke; Vincent D'Onofrio; Seymour Cassel
- Cinematography: Chris Norr
- Edited by: Hervé de Luze; Christel Dewynter
- Music by: Frédéric Verrières
- Distributed by: EuropaCorp
- Release dates: October 21, 2009 (Tokyo International Film Festival); November 20, 2009 (United States)
- Running time: 96 minutes
- Countries: France; United States
- Language: English

Staten Island (also known as Little New York) is a 2009 crime film written and directed by James DeMonaco in his directorial debut. It stars Ethan Hawke, Vincent D'Onofrio, and Seymour Cassel as three Staten Islanders whose lives intersect through a crime. Following a very limited theatrical run in New York City, it was released on DVD and Blu-ray Disc in December 2009.

== Synopsis ==
A Staten Island mob boss Parmie is robbed by a septic tank cleaner named Sully, who is friends with Jasper, a deaf deli employee moonlighting as a corpse chopper for Parmie.

== Cast ==
- Ethan Hawke as Sully Halverson
- Vincent D'Onofrio as Parmie Tarzo
- Seymour Cassel as Jasper Sabiano
- Julianne Nicholson as Mary Halverson
- Adrian Martinez as Officer Rodriguez

== Critical reception ==
On Rotten Tomatoes the film has an approval rating of 25% based on reviews from 8 critics. The New York Times critic praised the director James DeMonaco for "adroitly weaving violence, absurdity and sentiment, even an environmental consciousness, into a modest, appealing fable", while the reviewer from The New York Daily News blamed him for "wasting a strong cast in silly roles".
