= Weightless (film) =

- Directed by: Jaron Albertin
- Written by: Enda Walsh
- Produced by: Patrick Milling Smith; Greg Shapiro; Erin Wile
- Starring: Alessandro Nivola; Eli Haley; Julianne Nicholson; Johnny Knoxville
- Cinematography: Darren Lew
- Edited by: Eric Nagy
- Music by: J. Ralph
- Production companies: Smuggler Films; Kingsgate Films
- Distributed by: Paladin
- Release date: November 9, 2018
- Running time: 93 minutes 97 minutes 98 minutes
- Country: United States
- Language: English

Weightless is a 2018 American drama film written by Enda Walsh, directed by Jaron Albertin and starring Alessandro Nivola, Eli Haley, Julianne Nicholson and Johnny Knoxville.

== Cast ==
- Alessandro Nivola as Joel
- Eli Haley as Will
- Julianne Nicholson as Janeece
- Johnny Knoxville as Ed
- Phoebe Young as Carla
- Siobhan Fallon Hogan as Carol
- Marc Menchaca as Cody
- K. Todd Freeman as Dr. Mcleod
- Sean Meehan as Ben
- William Hill as Tim
- Matthew Miniero as Ryan
- Meryl Jones Williams as Sarah
- Christopher Jon Gombos as Ryan's Dad

== Release ==
The film was released on November 9, 2018.

== Reception ==
The film has a 58% rating on Rotten Tomatoes based on 12 reviews. Lorry Kikta of Film Threat awarded the film 7 stars out of 10.

Ken Jaworowski of The New York Times gave the film a positive review and wrote, "Here, deeply damaged people are prone to exasperating decisions. Yet these characters are so strikingly realized that you can’t help but care for them."

Katie Walsh of the Los Angeles Times also gave the film a positive review and wrote, "There’s a sense of beauty and contemplation in Albertin’s work, and though it seems like danger hangs in the air, there’s an odd lack of tension or suspense, and the film’s pace requires incredible patience."

The Hollywood Reporter also gave the film a positive review: "Though hardly a failure, the serious-minded work is less affecting than it might’ve been, relying sometimes on hints that are needlessly ambiguous and on symbols that don’t quite click."

Dennis Harvey of Variety gave the film a negative review and wrote, "...despite the emotional terra firma Nivola and other cast members try to provide, this drama about a taciturn loner forced into single-parenthood drifts into the ozone."
