= Tully (2000 film) =

- Theatrical release poster
- Directed by: Hilary Birmingham
- Written by: Hilary Birmingham; Matt Drake
- Story by: Tom McNeal
- Produced by: Hilary Birmingham; Anne Sundberg
- Starring: Glenn Fitzgerald; Anson Mount; Bob Burrus; Julianne Nicholson
- Cinematography: John Foster
- Edited by: Affonso Gonçalves
- Music by: Marcelo Zarvos
- Production company: Telltale Films
- Distributed by: Small Planet Pictures
- Release dates: April 14, 2000 (Los Angeles Independent Film Festival); November 1, 2002
- Running time: 102 minutes
- Country: United States
- Language: English
- Box office: $466,664

Tully is a 2000 American drama film written and directed by Hilary Birmingham, starring Glenn Fitzgerald, Anson Mount, Bob Burrus and Julianne Nicholson. The film was screened at the Los Angeles Independent Film Festival on April 14, 2000, and received a limited release in the United States on November 1, 2002. It is based on an O. Henry Award-winning short story by author Tom McNeal.

Originally titled The Truth About Tully, the film changed its name to avoid confusion with Jonathan Demme's The Truth About Charlie.

== Plot ==
The story centers on the Coates brothers, Tully and Earl, who live on their father's ranch in rural Nebraska. Their mother abandoned the family when the boys were young. Tully is very outgoing and has relationships with many women, including a stripper named April. Earl is more of an introvert.

Ella, a childhood friend of both Coates brothers, comes back to town to start a veterinary practice. Ella appears to have more in common with Earl, as she is reserved and not the typical woman that Tully dates. Yet, they start a relationship.

The elder Coates, Tully Sr., clearly misses his wife and as the film develops, his financial problems worsen. It is eventually shown that his financial problems are due to his wife's medical bills (he never got a divorce). Tully Sr. dies ambiguously. The film's climax shows how the brothers and Ella react to this tragic event.

== Cast ==
- Glenn Fitzgerald as Earl Coates
- Anson Mount as Tully Russell Coates Jr.
- Bob Burrus as Tully Russell Coates Sr.
- Julianne Nicholson as Ella Smalley
- Catherine Kellner as April Reece
- Laura Walker as Wendy Adams
- Tim Driscoll as Clarence Heiting
- Kristopher King as Dexter
- Delaney Driscoll as Mrs. Smalley
- John Diehl as Mal "Mac" MacAvoy

== Critical reception ==
The film develops with a very slow pace, and The New York Times critic Stephen Holden praises this in his review:

As deliberately paced as a late-afternoon amble around a homestead, the movie occasionally stops in its tracks to take a deep breath and soak in more of the rural atmosphere. Although this tendency to dawdle may frustrate viewers accustomed to a barrage of visual stimulation, the movie's unhurried rhythm eventually works a quiet spell, and after a while you find yourself settling back, adjusting to the film's bucolic metabolism and appreciating its eye and ear for detail.

Holden also compliments the acting, particularly that of Nicholson, whom he describes as "luminous in an utterly natural way". Kenneth Turan of the Los Angeles Times also commends the film's pace, stating that the "deliberate speed goes hand in hand with its unmistakable sense of place, its attraction to the rhythms of farm life and the unhurried sensibility of its small-town Nebraska setting".

Lisa Schwarzbaum of Entertainment Weekly gave the film a B+ rating, and writes, "the believable young people growing on this plot of soil are never predictable; neither are the unmannered, affecting performances".

Tully has an approval rating of 81% on Rotten Tomatoes based on 52 reviews.

== Awards and nominations ==
Award	Category	Name	Results
Independent Spirit Award	Best Debut Performance	Bob Burrus	Nominated
Independent Spirit Award	Best Feature	Hilary Birmingham, Anne Sundberg	Nominated
Independent Spirit Award	Best Screenplay	Hilary Birmingham, Matt Drake	Nominated
Independent Spirit Award	Best Supporting Female	Julianne Nicholson	Nominated
Newport International Film Festival	Audience Award, Best Drama	Hilary Birmingham	Won
Gen Art Film Festival	Audience Award, Best Feature Film	Hilary Birmingham	Won
