= Shadows and Lies =

- Film poster
- Spanish: Sombras y mentiras
- Directed by: Jay Anania
- Written by: Jay Anania
- Produced by: Piers Richardson; Sophia Lin
- Starring: James Franco; Julianne Nicholson; Josh Lucas
- Cinematography: Daniel Vecchione
- Edited by: Jay Anania
- Music by: John Medeski
- Distributed by: Millennium Entertainment
- Release date: 25 April 2010 (Tribeca)
- Running time: 100 minutos
- Language: English

Shadows and Lies (Spanish: Sombras y mentiras, also known as In Praise of Shadows and William Vincent) is a 2010 romantic drama film starring James Franco and Julianne Nicholson. Directed by Jay Anania, filming took place in New York City, New York. The film had a release at the Tribeca Film Festival in April 2010.

== Plot ==
William Vincent (James Franco) returns to New York after four years in exile to save the girl (Julianne Nicholson) he loves from the same dangerous crime syndicate that brought them together.

== Cast ==
- James Franco as William Vincent
- Julianne Nicholson as Ann
- Josh Lucas as Boss
- Martin Donovan as Victor
- Emily Tremaine as Cindy

== Reception ==
On the review aggregator website Rotten Tomatoes, 0% of 5 critics' reviews are positive.

Writing to The Hollywood Reporter, Frank Scheck said that "this dour, molasses-paced neo-noir, about a mysterious figure who becomes embroiled with a nasty criminal and his cohorts, sacrifices coherence and credibility for pretentious stylization."
