= Born to Win =

1971 film by Ivan Passer

- Directed by: Ivan Passer
- Written by: David Scott Milton (story); Ivan Passer
- Produced by: Philip Langner
- Starring: George Segal; Paula Prentiss; Karen Black
- Cinematography: Richard C. Kratina; Jack Priestley
- Edited by: Ralph Rosenblum
- Music by: William S. Fisher
- Distributed by: United Artists
- Release date: December 1, 1971
- Running time: 88 minutes
- Country: United States
- Language: English

Born to Win is a 1971 crime thriller directed by Ivan Passer (his first American film) and starring George Segal, Karen Black, Paula Prentiss, Hector Elizondo, Jay Fletcher and Robert De Niro. Filming locations were in Manhattan, specifically Times Square.

== Plot ==
J, a former hair dresser, has broken up with his wife and become an aimless drug addict frequenting Times Square. He lives his new life by dealing drugs from time to time for Vivian, a successful and intimidating drug dealer. J thinks that his life is about love and peace, yet he and his fellow friend and junkie Billy Dynamite try to steal a safe behind the back of a cashier. However, as with many of J's misadventures, they fail when confronted, and they chaotically flee the scene.

One day while trying to steal a car, J meets the car's owner Parm, a free spirited girl who takes a liking to J. They go back to her apartment, with J intending to steal things from her, yet the two fall in love. While making love, Parm finds a tattoo on J's arm that says "Born to Win", of which J is very proud.

When J returns to his routine, his drug habit grows and, after delivering drugs to Stanley, who is a prominent member of Vivian's supply chain, he and Billy return to steal back the drugs from Stanley's girlfriend. They have to ditch the drugs, however, when, on their way out of the apartment, two dirty policemen confront them and apprehend J. On the threat of serious jail time, J agrees to work alongside them by becoming a narc and reporting to them on Vivian.

Stanley soon catches up to J, who narrowly escapes serious harm from his men. After making an airport delivery, J and Parm flee the city to a beach on Long Island. They briefly experience romantic bliss, but J insists on returning to the city for payment for the airport delivery. On returning, he faces further, increasingly intense pressure from Stanley and Vivian. The detectives force him to arrange a meeting with Vivian, who senses that it is a set up and refuses to make a deal.

J reunites with Billy, and things seem hopeful again. Billy tells J that he appreciates the certainty of purpose that their lifestyle provides. This relative calm does not last long, however. While together in an office building, Billy shoots up with drugs that are intended for J and immediately dies—the drugs were a "hot shot" intended to kill.

A panicked and distraught J abandons his dead friend in the elevator. J and Parm make one last attempt to leave the city but run into the detectives again, who plant drugs on Parm and take her away for arrest. His plans having failed, J sinks deeper into turmoil with feelings of self-hatred and goes to Vivian's club. Vivian gives him free drugs, and both he and J acknowledge that the dosages may very easily be a hot shot. Alone and with his future completely uncertain, J sits on a bench in the middle of Times Square.

== Cast ==
Actor	Role
George Segal	J
Karen Black	Parm
Paula Prentiss	Veronica
Hector Elizondo	Vivian
Jay Fletcher	Billy Dynamite
Robert De Niro	Danny
Ed Madsen	Detective
Marcia Jean Kurtz	Marlene
Irving Selbst	Stanley
Burt Young	First hood

== Production ==
Ivan Passer and David Scott Milton started interviewing ex-addicts at the Phoenix House, near where they were putting on a play titled Duet for Solo Voice. The resulting screenplay was originally more serious in tone when shot. The comic elements were played up later during editing.

Milton based the film's characters on the addicts who frequented the Manhattan diner that he owned. He adapted his observations of these characters into a play titled Scraping Bottom. The resulting screenplay for the film was titled Scraping Bottom. The copyright clearly can be read under the title as being credited to Scraping Bottom Productions.

Some of the characters in the film are played by actual junkies, people who Passer encountered when researching the film.

The film was chosen to be screened at the New York Film Festival in October 1971.

The film was the first effort of a production company founded by George Segal and Jerry Tokofsky.

When Ed Madsen is chasing George Segal down the hallway, he slips and falls. This was not written in the screenplay. However, Passer thought that it looked so real that he decided to leave it in the movie.

According to Passer, Robert De Niro was nearly fired many times throughout shooting. A devoted Stella Adler student, he did things to define his secondary character to draw attention from the leads.

Paula Prentiss receives top billing despite appearing onscreen for about three minutes. When asked about this at the press screening at the New York Film Festival, Passer said that her agent demanded it, adding, "After all, what difference does it make?".

== Reception ==
Born to Win received mixed reviews, but many critics praised parts of it, including Segal's performance and the film's uniqueness.

Chicago Sun-Times film critic Roger Ebert said of the film, "...a good-bad movie that doesn't always work but has some really brilliant scenes."

Roger Greenspun of The New York Times wrote, "...is only Passer's second movie, and it is a dreadful disappointment—but not without its reasons, and not, I think, without some honor".

== Home release ==
Fun City Editions released a restored edition of the film (from a 35mm print) on Blu-ray May 31, 2022.
