= Tom McNeal =

American writer

Tom McNeal (born November 1947 in Santa Ana, California) is an American novelist and short story writer.

== Biography ==
Tom McNeal was educated at the University of California and Stanford University, where he was a Stegner Fellow and Jones Lecturer. He spent parts of boyhood summers at the Nebraska farm where his mother was born and raised, and later taught school in the nearby town that was the inspiration for his first novel, Goodnight, Nebraska, which won the James A. Michener Prize and the California Book Award. To Be Sung Underwater, his second novel, is set in both in California and Nebraska, and was named one of the 5 Best Novels of the Year by USA Today.

His short fiction has been included in Best American Short Stories, The O. Henry Prize Collection and The Pushcart Prize Collection, and "What Happened to Tully," which first appeared in The Atlantic Monthly, was made into the movie Tully. Additionally, with his wife, Laura Rhoton McNeal, he has co-authored four YA novels (Crooked; Zipped; Crushed; The Decoding of Lana Morris), all published by Knopf.

Far Far Away was published in 2013 and was a National Book Award finalist, Edgar Award finalist, winner of the California Book Award, winner of the Southern California Independent Booksellers Award, a Publishers Weekly Best Book of the Year, a School Library Journal Best Book of the Year, a Horn Book Fanfare Best book of the Year, and an ALA-YALSA Top Ten Best Fiction for Young Adults.

== Personal life ==
Tom lives in Coronado, California, with his wife Laura.

== Bibliography ==
=== Novels ===
- The Dog Who Lost His Bob (with Laura McNeal) Albert Whitman 1996 ISBN 9780807516621
- Goodnight, Nebraska Random House 1998 ISBN 9780375704291
- Crooked (with Laura McNeal) Knopf 1998 ISBN 9780375841910
- Zipped (with Laura McNeal) Knopf 2000 ISBN 9780375830983
- Crushed (with Laura McNeal) Knopf 2005 ISBN 9780375831218
- The Decoding of Lana Morris (with Laura McNeal) Knopf 2007 ISBN 9780375831225
- To Be Sung Underwater Hachette 2011 ISBN 9780316127387
- Far Far Away Knopf 2013 ISBN 9780375843297

=== Short stories ===
- California's Best: Two Centuries of Great Writing from the Golden State 2009 Edited by Peter Fish, Far Country Press ISBN 9781560374947
- "Watermelon Days" Zoetrope: All Story
- Best American Short Stories 2002 ("Watermelon Days") Mariner Books ISBN 9780618131730
- "What Happened to Tully" Prize Stories 1992: The O. Henry Awards Anchor Press ISBN 9780385421928

== Extern ==
- Official website
