= Singularity Principle =

- Directed by: David Robert Deranian; Austin Robert Hines
- Written by: David Robert Deranian; Austin Robert Hines
- Starring: William B. Davis; Michael Patrick Denis; John Diehl
- Cinematography: Darryl Kesslar
- Distributed by: Big Screen Entertainment; Epcott
- Release dates: March 29, 2013 (Japan); November 15, 2013 (United States)
- Running time: 87 minutes
- Countries: United States; Canada; Bahamas; Australia
- Language: English

Singularity Principle is a 2013 American-Canadian-Bahamian-Australian science fiction film starring William B. Davis, Michael Patrick Denis and John Diehl. The film was produced by Double A Pictures and Salient Clear. Epcott purchased rights to distribute the file in Japan The film was originally released in Japan cinemas in March, 2013 and in the United States in October 2013. The film was shot at the Canadian Light Source synchrotron in Saskatoon, with subsequent segments filmed in the Bahamas and Australia.

== Plot ==
Academic research scientist Jack Brenner (John Diehl) conducts an unauthorized secret experiment that creates a portal between parallel universes. Jack's protege, Dr. Peter Tanning (Michael Denis), is being questioned by Lawrence Cason (William B. Davis) who works for a clandestine black-ops organization to learn how to reproduce and control the physical process.

== Cast ==
- William B. Davis as Lawrence Cason
- Michael Patrick Denis as Dr. Peter Tanning
- John Diehl as Jack Brenner
- Amy LoCicero as Dr. Lori Cason
- Adam Formanek as Tim Sedal
- Darren Toombs as William 'Buck' Townsend
