= John Steppling (playwright) =

American playwright (born 1951)

- Born: June 18, 1951 (age 75); Burbank, California, U.S.
- Education: Hollywood High School
- Occupations: Playwright, screenwriter, teacher
- Notable work: The Dream Coast; The Shaper
- Spouse: Gunnhild Skrodal Steppling
- Awards: Fellow, Rockefeller Foundation; National Endowment for the Arts
- Website: john-steppling.com

John Steppling (born June 18, 1951 in Burbank, California) is an American playwright, screenwriter and teacher. Steppling's plays have been produced in the United States and Europe. He received fellowships from the Rockefeller Foundation and the National Endowment for the Arts, and has received PEN-West, LA Weekly and Dramalogue awards for his theatrical work.

== Early life ==
Born in Burbank, Steppling was raised in Hollywood and attended Hollywood High. His mother was a former beauty queen turned bookmaker who suffered from alcoholism. His father, Carl Steppling, was a part-time actor and wardrobe assistant in community theatre. His grandfather, John Steppling, was a silent-film actor who appeared in many Essanay films. Steppling has noted that his upbringing moving from neighborhood to neighborhood in L.A with a family at the fringe of the film industry influenced his work, in particular, The Dream Coast. His experiences of the "seamy underside" of Los Angeles influenced the characters in his plays, which often concern the marginalized of American society.

== 1970s: New York, Los Angeles, "Padua Hills" ==
Steppling's introduction to theater came from New York's Off-off-Broadway stage in the 1970s, where he saw his cousin, Jim Storm, perform in the 1971 premiere of Sam Shepard's The Mad Dog Blues. During his time in New York, Steppling moved in the circles associated with the writers and performing artists of the group "Theater Genesis", including Murray Mednick

Returning to Los Angeles, Steppling became a founding member of the Padua Hills Playwrights Workshop and Festival in 1978 along with Murray Mednick and Sam Shepard. Steppling remained involved in Padua for most of its 17-year existence, among other notable playwrights associated with the festival such as María Irene Fornés, Jon Robin Baitz, Martin Epstein, Kelly Stuart, and John O'Keefe.

== 1980s ==
In the 1980s Steppling wrote the plays Neck, Eddie Cottrel at the Piano, Close, The Shaper, and The Dream Coast. The Mark Taper Forum took an interest in his work and some of his plays were developed in Taper sponsored workshops.

The Shaper, (1984) was chosen for the Humana Festival of New American Plays, in Louisville, Kentucky and nominated for a Pulitzer Prize. At this time Steppling also worked as a writer for hire for Hollywood, notably adapting Elmore Leonard's novel 52 Pick-Up, directed by John Frankenheimer.

In 1986, on the day of the theatrical release of 52 Pick-Up, The Dream Coast, inspired by Steppling's father and his cronies working on the fringe of the film industry, opened at the Taper, Too. The play was published in West Coast Plays the following year.

Robert Egan, former producing artistic director of the Mark Taper Forum, took a special interest in Steppling during this period. While Steppling's work, which is both emotionally and politically downbeat and aesthetically challenging in the modernist tradition, was considered unsuitable for the Taper's main stage, many of the playwright's works were developed by the Taper's new works program, the Taper, Too.

In this era, the word "Stepplingesque" entered the parlance of Los Angeles theatre world. At the end of the 1980s, Los Angeles Times critic Robert Koehler could write of Steppling's growing reputation as potentially “the purest, finest poet of the stage that Los Angeles has produced in this generation.”

In the late 1980s, Steppling formed Heliogabalus. Steppling's Teenage Wedding, winner of the PEN Center Literary Award for Drama in 1987, originated as a Heliogabalus production. It was later staged in New York, as was Sea of Cortez (At Home for Contemporary Theatre and Art).

== 1990s ==
In the first years of the decade, Steppling wrote and directed The Thrill, Standard of the Breed, Theory of Miracles, and The Sea of Cortez.

Developed for the Los Angeles Theater Center, Sea of Cortez, marked a turning point in Steppling's critical reception. Sylvie Drake, of the Los Angeles Times, wrote that the play was “powerful yet difficult to embrace because it is so terminally despairing and virtually humorless.”

Film director Barbet Schroeder, helped finance the New York production of the award-winning Teenage Wedding, in 1991 of New York magazine.

During this period, Steppling continued leading workshops. In 1990, actor-director Rick Dean revived Steppling's one-act, Neck (1982) which was a critical success. It had an extended run at The Lost Studio, run by Cinda Jackson.

The 1990s also saw Steppling undertaking film and television, including a staff position on Cracker and wrote the screenplay for Animal Factory, (2000) directed by Steve Buscemi, based on the Edward Bunker novel.

In the early nineteen nineties Steppling founded Circus Minimus with Mick Collins and Cinda Jackson. Workshops were conducted at Jackson's The Lost Studio. Steppling told Jan Breslauer, of the Los Angeles Times, "This is about more than theater; it's about ideas, the nature of performing and the creative process"

Circus Minimus folded and was followed by Empire Red Lip, whose core members included former Padua students. Based in Silver Lake, Los Angeles. Empire Red Lip focused on collaborative projects, each stemming from intensive reading of a text: The Conquest of the New World, for example, stemmed from the writing of Bartolomé de las Casas; Murdered Sleep and White Cold Virgin Snow were oblique commentaries on plays by William Shakespeare.

Steppling wrote the screen adaptation for Eddie Bunker's Animal Factory, which was directed by Steve Buscemi and starred Willem DaFoe, Edward Furlong, and Mickey Rourke. He left the United States soon after completing the film.

== 2000s ==
At the beginning of the millennium, Steppling moved to Europe. After sojourns in Paris and London, he moved to Poland to teach at National Film School in Łódź. During his stay in Łódź, Steppling did an adaptation of William Shakespeare’s King Lear featuring Marian Opania, and co-starring Mick Collins. The production was done in three languages: Polish, English, and Norwegian.

Steppling returned to Los Angeles, briefly, to oversee the 2002 production of Dog Mouth, a play that was developed from a Taper workshop and was co-directed by the Taper's Robert Egan.

Toward the end of the decade, Steppling moved to Norway where, in 2009, he wrote and directed a twenty-minute film, Then They Recognized Me, with support of the Mid Nordic Film Commission. The film was shot in Rissa, Norway and starred longtime collaborator, Lee Kissman.

In 2010, Steppling moved back to Southern California and with his son, organized a new theatrical concern, Gunfighter Nation. The inaugural production, The Alamo Project, ran at The Odyssey Theater in West Los Angeles. The group's second production The LA History Project, marked Steppling's return to The Lost Studio.

Late in 2010, Steppling premiered Phantom Luck, Steppling cast his cousin, James Storm in the lead role, and which won LA Weekly's best play award.

He moved back to Norway where he lives with his wife and sons.

Steppling wrote a screenplay based on crime author Cathy Scott's book Death in the Desert, which was produced and directed in 2015 by filmmaker Josh Evans. The film of the same title premiered at the 2015 Tucson Festival of Films.

Steppling wrote the non-fiction book Aesthetic Resistance and Dis-Interest: That Which Will Not Allow Itself to Be Said, which was released in 2016 by Mimesis International.

== Personal life ==
Steppling is married to Norwegian filmmaker Gunnhild Skrodal Steppling and lives in Norway where he conducts writing workshops, and serves as artistic director of Gunfighter Nation. He blogs about politics, art, and current affairs on his web site and has had numerous political articles published at Counterpunch, Dissident Voice, and Znet.

== Publications ==
- Absolute Disaster: Fiction from Los Angeles (Santa Monica Review Press and Dove Books), 1996;
- Sea of Cortez and Other Plays (Sun & Moon), 1999;
- West Coast Plays 21/22 (California Theater Council), 1987;
- Best of the West (Padua Hills Press), 1991;
- Los Angeles Under the Influence: 20 LA Writers, Their Influences and their work (Doublewide Press), 2002
- Aesthetic Resistance and Dis-Interest: Things Which Will Not Allow Themselves to Be Said (Mimesis), 2016
