= Julianne Nicholson =

American actress (born 1971)

- Nicholson in 2017
- Born: July 1, 1971 (age 55)
- Education: Hunter College
- Occupation: Actress
- Years active: 1997–present
- Spouse: Jonathan Cake (m. 2004)
- Children: 2

Julianne Nicholson (born July 1, 1971) is an American actress. She is known for her roles in the film August: Osage County (2013) and the television series Law & Order: Criminal Intent (2006–2009), Masters of Sex (2013–2014), Eyewitness (2016), Mare of Easttown (2021), Paradise and Hacks (both in 2025), the latter three of which earned her nominations for Primetime Emmy Awards, winning two for Mare of Easttown and Hacks.

Nicholson's other notable credits include Tully (2000), Ally McBeal (2001–2002), Kinsey (2004), Conviction (2006), Boardwalk Empire (2011–2013), Black Mass (2015), I, Tonya (2017), Togo (2019), The Outsider (2020) and Blonde (2022).

== Early life ==
After Nicholson's parents separated when she was young, she lived with her mother and stepfather in Wendell, a small town in western Massachusetts. She later described her upbringing as a "different way of living .. We had kerosene lanterns and camp candles and had a pump for water". She began living with her father at 11 years old. At age 18, she moved to New York, where she majored in French and anthropology at Hunter College. While in New York, Nicholson supported herself by waitressing and eventually left school to study acting and begin her professional career.

== Career ==
=== Film ===
In her first feature film role, Nicholson starred opposite Michael Caine and James Spader in the Peter Yates film Curtain Call. Later she won what proved to be both her breakthrough and favorite role as a headstrong young feminist in Peter Chan's The Love Letter. She has worked with other international directors in films such Alain Berliner's Passion of Mind, and Nick Hurran's Little Black Book. Nicholson's domestic drama credits include William Vincent, Staten Island, Brief Interviews with Hideous Men, Tully, Kinsey, and August: Osage County, for which the ensemble cast was nominated for several awards. Her domestic comedy credits include Seeing Other People, Puccini For Beginners, and Disney's Togo opposite Willem Dafoe. She also stars in the American espionage thriller, The Amateur.

=== Television ===
Among Nicholson's television credits are a supporting role in the television miniseries Storm of the Century and guest-starring roles in ER and Law & Order. She was tapped by Steven Spielberg for the lead role in the paranormal drama The Others. In late 2001, Nicholson became one of the main cast members of the hit show Ally McBeal, portraying Jenny Shaw for 13 episodes. She worked on the medical drama Presidio Med and the HBO pilot Marriage. Julianne worked on the short-lived NBC television drama, Conviction and in what is her best known role, as Megan Wheeler, in the sixth, seventh, and eighth seasons of Law & Order: Criminal Intent. Nicholson has said her favorite Criminal Intent episode was "Weeping Willow". As of the Criminal Intent episode "Major Case", Nicholson departed the series when she went on maternity leave for the birth of her second child (which was written into the show as the birth of her first child).

In 2011, she guest-starred on Royal Pains as "Jess", one of Dr. Lawson's patients, who has panic attacks. She also appeared on Boardwalk Empire as the recurring character of U.S. Assistant Attorney General Esther Randolph (a character based on the real life Mabel Walker Willebrandt) that same year. In 2012, she guest-starred on The Good Wife as Callie Simko, an attorney who has an interest in Will Gardner.

On October 16, 2016, Nicholson played the lead role of Sheriff Helen Torrance in USA Network's 10-episode police drama, Eyewitness.

In 2021, Nicholson starred in the HBO series Mare of Easttown as Lori Ross, best friend of the titular Mare Sheehan, played by Kate Winslet. The series proved to be a ratings hit for HBO, breaking viewership records. Her role in the series brought her critical acclaim, with critics especially highlighting her harrowing performance in the series finale. The role won Nicholson her first Primetime Emmy Award for Outstanding Supporting Actress in a Limited Series. She also earned a nomination at the Critics Choice Awards for the same role.

In 2025, Nicholson earned Emmy nominations in the Outstanding Guest Actress in a Comedy Series category for her role as Mary "Dance Mom" Alice in Hacks, and Outstanding Supporting Actress in a Drama Series category for her role as Samantha "Sinatra" Redmond in Paradise, winning the former.

=== Theater ===
Nicholson has been in a number of plays in New York. Her work in theater includes plays written by Craig Lucas, Adam Rapp, and Sam Shepard.

== Personal life ==
In 2004, she married British actor Jonathan Cake in Italy; they met while playing a couple on an unaired HBO pilot called Marriage. They have two children.

== Acting credits ==
Key
†	Denotes films that have not yet been released

=== Film ===
Year	Title	Role	Notes
1998	Harvest	Lou Yates	
1998	Long Time Since	Vivian James / Phoebe	
1998	One True Thing	College Student	
1998	Curtain Call / It All Came True	Sandra Hewson	
1999	The Love Letter	Jennifer McNeely	
2000	Hero	Young German Woman	Short film
2000	Passion of Mind	Kim	
2000	Godass	Nancy	
2000	Tully	Ella Smalley	
2001	Dead Dog	Charity	
2002	Speakeasy	Rebecca	
2002	Strike a Light	Girl	
2002	I'm with Lucy	Jo	
2004	Seeing Other People	Alice	
2004	Little Black Book	Joyce Moore	
2004	Kinsey	Alice Martin	
2005	Seagull	Julianne	
2005	Her Name Is Carla	Carla	
2006	Flannel Pajamas	Nicole Reilly	
2006	Puccini for Beginners	Samantha	
2006	Two Weeks	Emily Bergman	
2009	Brief Interviews with Hideous Men	Sara Quinn	
2009	Staten Island	Mary Halverson	
2010	Shadows and Lies	Ann	Also known as In Praise of Shadows and William Vincent
2012	Keep the Lights On	Claire	
2013	August: Osage County	Ivy Weston	
2015	Black Mass	Marianne Connolly	
2015	Ten Thousand Saints	Harriet Horn	
2016	Sophie and the Rising Sun	Sophie Willis	
2016	From Nowhere	Jackie	
2017	Novitiate	Nora Harris	
2017	I, Tonya	Diane Rawlinson	
2017	Who We Are Now	Beth	Also producer
2018	Weightless	Janeece	
2019	Monos	'Doctora' Sara Watson	
2019	Togo	Constance Seppala	
2019	Iniciales S.G.	Jane	
2021	With/In: Volume 2	Mom	Segment: "Touching"; also director
2022	Blonde	Gladys Pearl Baker	
2022	Weird: The Al Yankovic Story	Mary Yankovic	
2023	Janet Planet	Janet	
2023	Dream Scenario	Janet Matthews	
2025	The Amateur	Director Samantha O'Brien	
2025	The Tiger	Twin	Short film
TBA	The Riders	Jennifer Scully	Filming

=== Television ===
Year	Title	Role	Notes
1997	Nothing Sacred	Cara	Episode: "Parents and Children"
1998	Dellaventura	Carol Dakin	Episode: "David & Goliath"
1998	New York Undercover	Daisy	Episode: "Sign o' the Times"
1999	Storm of the Century	Katrina Withers	TV miniseries
2000	The Others	Marian Kitt	Main role (13 episodes)
2001	Law & Order	Jessie Lucas	Episode: "All My Children"
2001–2002	Ally McBeal	Jenny Shaw	Main role (13 episodes)
2002	Presidio Med	Dr. Jules Keating	Main role (4 episodes)
2004	ER	Jordan	Episodes: "Just a Touch", "Abby Normal"
2006	The Water Is Wide	Barbara	TV film
2006	Conviction	Christina Finn	Main role (13 episodes)
2006–2009	Law & Order: Criminal Intent	Detective Megan Wheeler	Main role (Seasons 6–8)
2011	Royal Pains	Jess Walsh	Episode: "Fight or Flight"
2011–2013	Boardwalk Empire	Esther Randolph	Recurring role (11 episodes)
2012	The Good Wife	Callie Simko	Episodes: "Pants on Fire", "The Penalty Box"
2012	Covert Affairs	Anna Lise Pound	Episode: "The Last Thing You Should Do"
2013–2014	Masters of Sex	Dr. Lillian DePaul	Recurring role (12 episodes)
2014–2015	The Red Road	Jean Jensen	12 episodes
2016	Eyewitness	Sheriff Helen Torrance	Main role (10 episodes)
2017	Law & Order True Crime	Jill Lansing	Main role (5 episodes)
2020	The Outsider	Glory Maitland	TV miniseries
2020	Robot Chicken	Winifred Sanderson (voice)	Episode: "Ghandi Mulholland in: Plastic Doesn't Get Cancer"
2021	Mare of Easttown	Lori Ross	TV miniseries
2022	Winning Time: The Rise of the Lakers Dynasty	Cranny McKinney	7 episodes
2025–present	Paradise	Samantha 'Sinatra' Redmond	Main cast (16 episodes)
2025	Dope Girls	Kate Galloway	6 episodes
2025	Hacks	Dance Mom	3 episodes

=== Theater ===
Year	Title	Role	Playwright	Director	Notes
2000	Stranger	Stewardess / Linda's Mom / Girl	Craig Lucas	Mark Brokaw	The Vineyard Theater
2009	This	Jane	Melissa James Gibson	Daniel Aukin	Playwrights Horizons
2010	Parents' Evening	Judy	Bathsheba Doran	Jim Simpson	The Flea
2011	The Hallway Trilogy: Rose	Mary	Adam Rapp	Adam Rapp	Rattlestick Playwrights Theater
2011	The Hallway Trilogy: Paraffin	Margo	Adam Rapp	Daniel Aukin	Rattlestick Playwrights Theater
2012	Heartless	Sally	Sam Shepard	Daniel Aukin	Signature Theatre

== Awards and nominations ==
Year	Association	Category	Work	Result	Ref.
2003	Independent Spirit Awards	Best Supporting Female	Tully	Nominated	
2004	US Comedy Arts Festival	Best Actress	Seeing Other People	Won	
2013	Hollywood Film Awards	Hollywood Ensemble Award	August: Osage County	Won	
2013	Washington D.C. Area Film Critics Association	Best Ensemble	August: Osage County	Nominated	
2013	Detroit Film Critics Society	Best Ensemble	August: Osage County	Nominated	
2013	Phoenix Film Critics Society	Best Acting Ensemble	August: Osage County	Nominated	
2013	Nevada Film Critics Society	Best Ensemble Cast	August: Osage County	Won	
2014	Capri Hollywood International Film Festival	Best Ensemble Cast	August: Osage County	Won	
2014	Critics' Choice Movie Awards	Best Acting Ensemble	August: Osage County	Nominated	
2014	Screen Actors Guild Awards	Outstanding Performance by a Cast in a Motion Picture	August: Osage County	Nominated	
2015	Critics' Choice Television Awards	Best Guest Performer in a Drama Series	Masters of Sex	Nominated	
2017	Hollywood Film Awards	Hollywood Ensemble Award	I, Tonya	Won	
2021	Astra TV Awards (Note: Previously known as Hollywood Critics Association TV Awards.)	Best Supporting Actress in a Limited Series, Anthology Series or Television Movie	Mare of Easttown	Nominated	
2021	Dorian TV Awards	Best Supporting TV Performance	Mare of Easttown	Nominated	
2021	Primetime Emmy Awards	Outstanding Supporting Actress in a Limited or Anthology Series or Movie	Mare of Easttown	Won	
2021	Online Film & Television Association	Best Supporting Actress in a Motion Picture, Limited or Anthology Series	Mare of Easttown	Runner-up	
2022	Critics' Choice Television Awards	Best Supporting Actress in a Limited Series or Movie Made for Television	Mare of Easttown	Nominated	
2022	Satellite Awards	Best Supporting Actress – Series, Miniseries or Television Film	Mare of Easttown	Nominated	
2022	Women Film Critics Circle	Mommie Dearest Worst Screen Mom of the Year	Blonde	Won	
2025	Astra TV Awards	Best Supporting Actress in a Drama Series	Paradise	Nominated	
2025	Critics' Choice Super Awards	Best Villain in a Series, Limited Series or Made-for-TV Movie	Paradise	Nominated	
2025	Primetime Emmy Awards	Outstanding Supporting Actress in a Drama Series	Paradise	Nominated	
2025	Primetime Emmy Awards	Outstanding Guest Actress in a Comedy Series	Hacks	Won	
2025	Online Film & Television Association	Best Guest Actress in a Comedy Series	Hacks	Nominated	
2026	Primetime Emmy Awards	Outstanding Supporting Actress in a Drama Series	Paradise	Nominated	
