= Theatre Genesis =

Coordinates: 40.7305°N 73.9874°W

- Formation: 1964
- Founder: Ralph Cook
- Type: Off-off-Broadway
- Legal status: defunct
- Location: St. Mark's Church in-the-Bowery, New York City

Theatre Genesis was an off-off-Broadway theater founded in 1964 by Ralph Cook. Located in the historic St. Mark's Church in-the-Bowery in the East Village of Manhattan, it produced the work of new American playwrights, including Lanford Wilson, Tony Barsha, Murray Mednick, Leonard Melfi, Walter Hadler, and Sam Shepard. Theatre Genesis is often credited as one of the original off-off-Broadway theaters, along with Joe Cino's Caffe Cino, Ellen Stewart's La MaMa Experimental Theatre Club, and Judson Poets Theatre.

The theatre was known for its anarchistic, heterosexual, machismo energy, and often produced political plays. Like the other off-off-Broadway theatres, Theatre Genesis used a non-commercial model of production.

== Founding the theatre ==
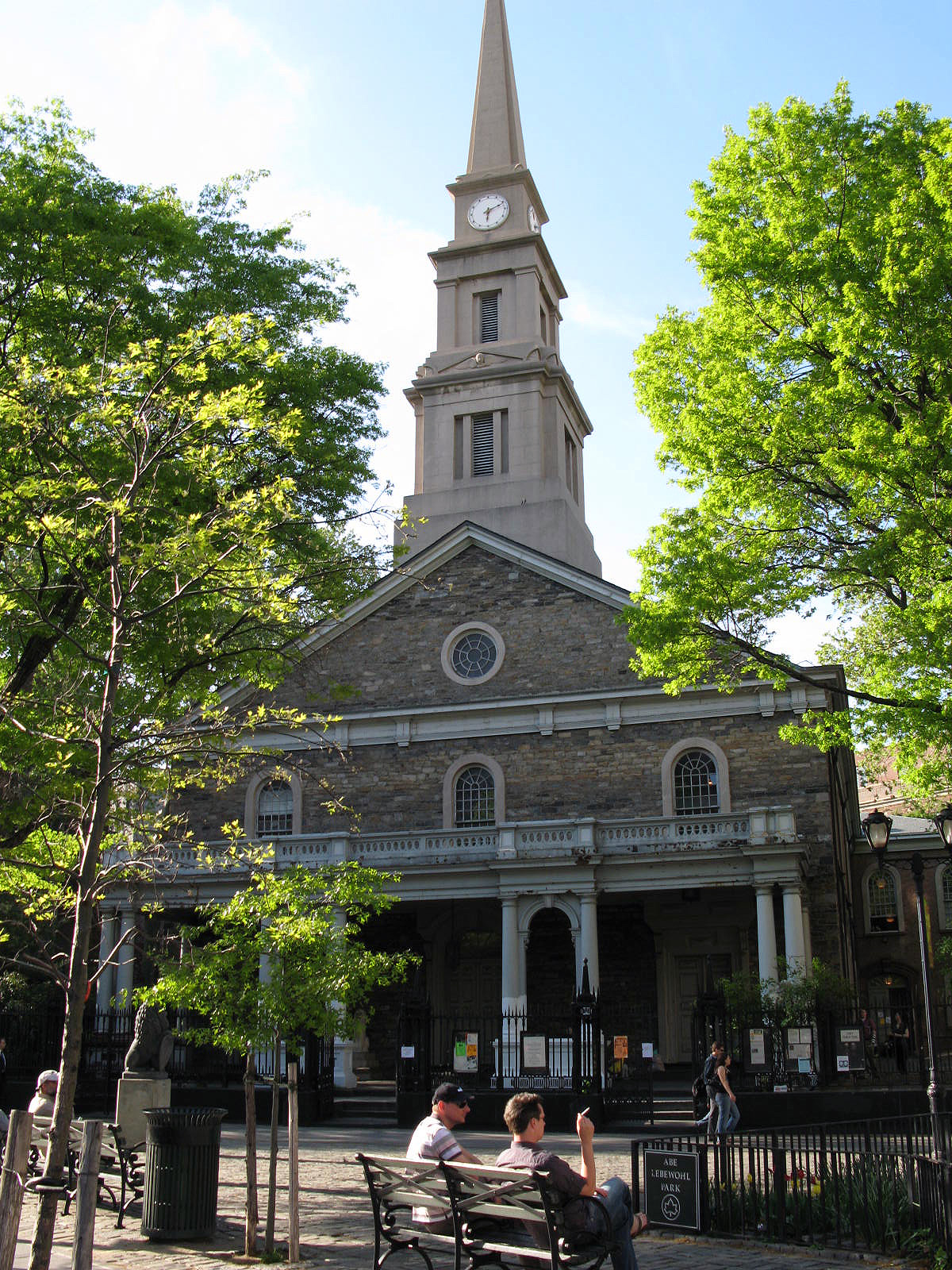
St Mark's Church - New York City

=== Michael Allen at St. Mark's ===
A young, progressive Episcopalian rector named Michael Allen came to St. Mark's in 1963 and opened the parish to everyone from the neighborhood. He did outreach to the many demographics and ethnicities in the East Village, which included artists, counterculturists, immigrants, and homeless people, among others. Allen aimed to fund arts and education initiatives in order to reflect the character of the neighborhood. Unlike Judson Church, in the West Village, the cultural programming at St. Mark's received minimal resistance from the church's older, wealthier, more conservative members.

Plays, poetry readings, underground films, and political gatherings began happening regularly at the church. Allen then decided an additional staff member was necessary to coordinate this programming, and hired Ralph Cook.

=== Ralph Cook as curator ===
After temporarily employing the curator Tom Pike, Allen met Ralph Cook, an actor, who came to one of Allen's Sunday services. Cook began coming to the church regularly, and Allen and Cook became friends. Allen hired Cook for the role of curator, as Cook was well-connected in the downtown arts scene and had many friends who were looking for a space to showcase their creative work. His friends included Sam Shepard, Murray Mednick, Leonard Melfi, and Tom Sankey, among others. Their writing reflected the political and social upheaval that they were witnessing, and was often full of angst and testosterone. Their work didn't fit comfortably into the perceived camp aesthetic and looser structure at Caffe Cino and La MaMa. The church housed a 70-seat black box theater with sixteen lights, nine dimmers, spare sets, and minimal props. Much of the work being produced at the theatre had nihilistic themes. Cook said of Theatre Genesis:

Here, now, in lower Manhattan, the phenomenon is taking place: the beginning, the Genesis, of a cultural revolution. It is taking place out of utter necessity. Out of the necessity to survive....Personally I have little hope for the survival of our civilization. But whatever hope we have lies with our artists. For they alone have the ability (if we do not continue to corrupt them) to withstand the onslaught of the mass media and the multitude of false gods. They alone have the ability to show us ourselves.

== Early history of the theatre ==
=== Sam Shepard ===
As the theatre's newly-hired "lay minister of the arts", Cook began his routine of reading scripts. He quickly created a diligent and thorough selection process with a two-pronged production track: there was a season of six or fewer new plays, and a Monday night workshop series where playwrights could have their work read. Cook believed in giving new playwrights exposure and continuity, in order to develop the artist in addition to the individual play. Cook never commissioned work or guaranteed that a work would be produced in the future. While this often led Genesis playwrights to produce their work elsewhere, it also developed their trust in Cook to be honest and objective.

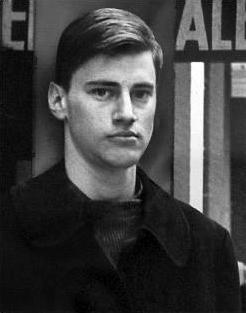
Sam Shepard at the age of 20, when he was first produced at Theatre Genesis

After an early off-key production of Michael Boyd's Study in Color, Cook produced a double-bill of one-acts by Sam Shepard. Cowboys and The Rock Garden were both homages to Samuel Beckett, and reflected Shepard's wanderings with then-comrade Charles Mingus III (son of Charles Mingus). The one-acts harnessed his youthful energy, using playful language, but also represented a raw, innovative voice from the streets. Shepard describes those first productions:

We were in rehearsal for [two plays] within that week... We had no money. I can remember getting props off the street. We'd take Yuban coffee cans, punch a hole in them, and use them for lights. We did it all from scratch, which was pretty incredible.

Cowboys and The Rock Garden were largely dismissed by critics, who could not see past the similarities to Beckett. However, Michael Smith of The Village Voice wrote in 1964:

I know it sounds pretentious and unprepossessing: 'Theatre Genesis... dedicated to the new playwright'... But they have actually found a new playwright, [and] he has written a pair of provocative and genuinely original plays... Shepard is feeling his way, working with an intuitive approach to language and dramatic structure and moving into an area between ritual and naturalism, where character transcends psychology, fantasy breaks down literalism, and the patterns of ordinariness have their own lives. His is a gestalt theater which evokes the existence behind behavior.

Smith's review bolstered attendance, allowing the public to notice Shepard and introducing other new playwrights to the theatre.

=== Off-off-Broadway, off-Broadway, and Broadway ===
Although Shepard's work was produced in other off-off-Broadway theaters, he considered Theatre Genesis his true beginning. In 1965, his one-act Chicago was produced alongside Lawrence Ferlinghetti's The Customs Inspector in Baggy Pants. The production was transferred to another theatre due to its success, which caused problems for shows like Chicago for multiple reasons. First, Theatre Genesis plays were often written in response to the increasingly consumerist model of off-Broadway theatre. They were written specifically for the gritty, intimate environment of Theatre Genesis. Uptown, the plays lost their context and were less successful. Sally Banes has argued that, "For off-off-Broadway, graduating to off-Broadway - leaving the alternative home and the alternative community - was a fate to be avoided, for it altered the relations of production, turning the artists into alienated labor." Ralph Cook is quoted as saying, "We couldn't care less about Broadway. We are aware that it exists somewhere uptown, no more."

There were also more practical concerns about transferring shows uptown. Due to union restrictions in off-Broadway theatres, a transfer meant that most of the non-union cast had to be replaced. Shepard and his actors were frustrated when Chicago was transferred, as many of his actors had helped to create their roles. Off-off-Broadway's tensions with Actors' Equity Association continued until the showcase code was created. This code allows union actors to perform in experimental, not-for-profit productions in exchange for being compensated for travel expenses to rehearsals.

Jack Kroll said of the theatre:

Theatre Genesis is a mix of counterculture ingredients; a coolness that can explode like liquid oxygen, a dropout hipsterism, a polymorphous perversity of language and feeling, a Zap Comix mocking of straight heads.

=== Melfi, Koutoukas, and Mednick ===
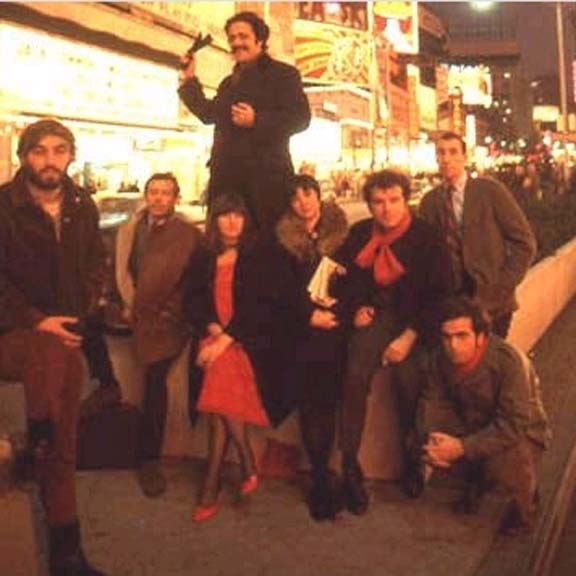
Lanford Wilson, Jean-Claude van Itallie, H.M. Koutoukas, Rosalyn Drexler, Irene Fornes, Leonard Melfi, Tom Eyen, Paul Foster --many of whom were produced at Theatre Genesis. 1966

Between 1964 and 1966, Cook produced debut productions of many playwrights, including one-acts from a then-unknown Charles L. Mee. Another early production was a version of Medea by H.M. Koutoukas. The production was set in a laundromat, where Medea kills her offspring in the washing machine. Koutoukas was simultaneously having his work produced at Theatre Genesis and Caffe Cino, not having told either theatre about the other theatre's production. The Caffe Cino production had Medea played by a man (Charles Stanley) in drag. When Koutoukas submitted the script to Genesis, the role was played by a woman (Linda Eskenas), which he intended as a prank. Although the production was successful, Cook was angry at Koutoukas. Theatre Genesis' production of Koutoukas' Medea opened on October 31, 1965, the final weekend of the Caffe Cino run. Many favored the campy Cino production. Paul Foster describes the play's climax:

Medea was there for you to reach out and touch, forming the unspeakable crime of infanticide in her mind. Then she threw her baby into a laundromat and washed it to death with Oxydol. She slammed the lid down and set the dial on HEAVY LOAD. How can you forget things like that?

A third production, with the Caffe Cino cast, ran at La MaMa on October 13, 1965. The three productions of Koutoukas' Medea, at Caffe Cino, La MaMa, and Theatre Genesis, furthered the divide between the campiness of the first two theaters and the more masculine persona of Theatre Genesis.

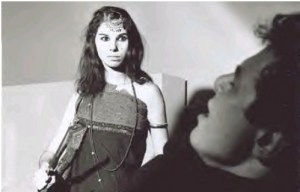
Linda Eskenas and Anthony Sciabona in "Medea" by Harry M. Koutoukas, Theatre Genesis. Photo by James D. Gossage.

Leonard Melfi would become Theatre Genesis' most-produced playwright. In 1965, Melfi had five of his one-acts produced by Cook. He received the most success for his short play Birdbath. The play was written specifically for Cook, who would later direct the production, and was originally titled Coffeecake and Caviar. Birdbath's plot centers around Frankie, who has a one-night stand with a waitress named Velma. They drink and talk into the night, going further into their hidden pasts, until Velma reveals that she murdered her mother earlier that morning. Birdbath remained a staple of off-off-Broadway, receiving a production at La MaMa and later being published by Ellen Stewart in Six From La Mama.

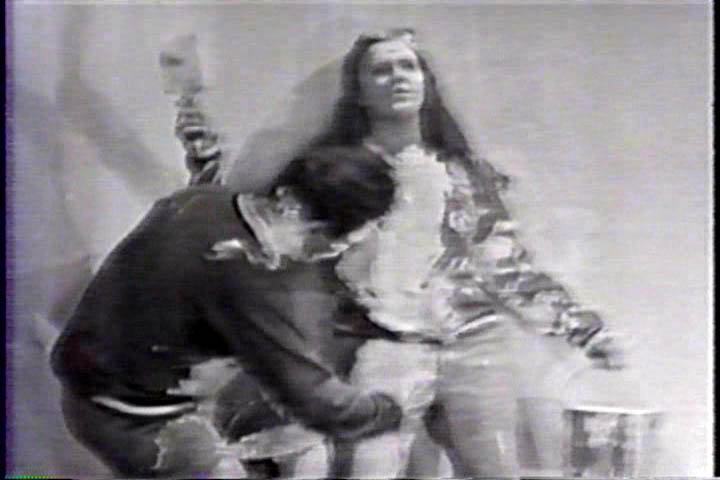
Joe Chaikin paints Joyce Aaron in San Shepard's "Fourteen Hundred Thousand" at Theatre Genesis cir. 1967

Perhaps the most experimental and enigmatic of the Theatre Genesis playwrights was Murray Mednick. Mednick, who later co-ran Theatre Genesis after Cook's departure, often workshopped his scripts repeatedly with Genesis actors before finalizing the text. His plays The Hunter, Willie the Germ, and The Hawk were ritualistic interpretations of life on the streets. For The Hawk, Mednick developed the script through improvisation with a group of actors over two months. An exploration of drug addiction, The Hawk employed the ritual elements and poetic language emblematic of Theatre Genesis. The free-form style of the play began to appear with greater frequency at theaters like The Living Theater and Joseph Chaikin's The Open Theater, and was a departure from the scripted plays previously produced at Theatre Genesis. Smith, of The Village Voice, wrote:

The Hawk is convincingly detailed, yet mysterious... sharply contemporary, the form strange but not obstructive; it is performed with exceptional immediacy and authority; its ultimate intent remains veiled or vague, but the other levels are so rich it doesn't matter.... in moving beyond the documentary realism of the world of heroin addiction, The Hawk and Theatre Genesis had gone a step beyond gritty poetic realism, and for that reason, it was perhaps the most daring venture yet attempted by Genesis and perhaps its single most important achievement.

Mednick describes his use of poetic language in the play:

There was a kind of presentational quality to the language which I think we were very influenced by. We had a similar attitude toward language, which has to do with a feeling about the spoken word as an almost shamanistic act, incantatory, ritualistic, as opposed to the theatrical dialogue tradition... We had a very high estimation of the idea of the word itself coming through the medium of the actor.

== Masculinity and heterosexism of Theatre Genesis ==
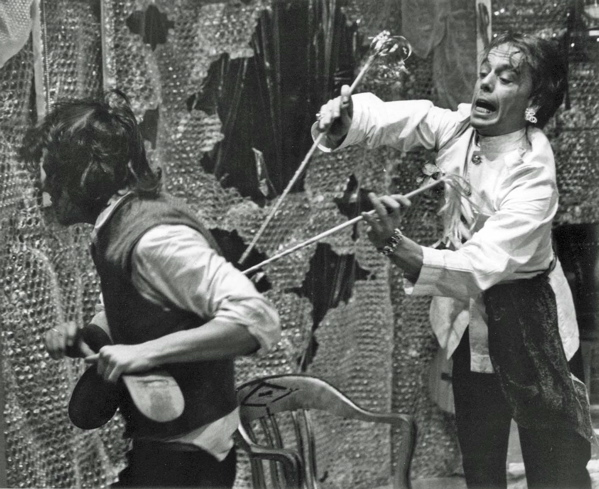
Ben Masters and Bill Moor in María Irene Fornés' “Tango Palace” at Theatre Genesis. 1973.

Most of the work produced at Theatre Genesis incorporated testosterone and drugs, and the close-knit community of artists created a perceived machismo persona for the theater. Tony Barsha, a playwright who has said that the heterosexual environment of Theatre Genesis made it the only off-off-Broadway theatre where he felt comfortable, is quoted saying that the theatre consisted of "a bunch of guys, and their babes, and their drugs".

However, many women did work at the Genesis in later years, including María Irene Fornés. She said of the theatre:

[Theatre Genesis] was not macho in the usual way, but something very kind of defeated... Not 'macho macho', but 'macho drug', which is different. These were straight men but from the street drug world. Macho drug has this kind of undercurrent of anger, disappointment, possible violence.

By 1967, the divide between the homosexual environment of Caffe Cino and the heterosexual Theatre Genesis began to dissolve. More work was focused on social and political issues, particularly America's involvement in Vietnam and civil and gay rights. One Genesis production involving social and political commentary was Grant Duay's Fruit Salad (1967). The play juxtaposed film footage of a woman making fruit salad with scenes of soldiers engaged in war. Each soldier had a name like Banana, Melon, or Cherry, and the seriousness of their situation was intended to be juxtaposed against the trivial nature of the fruit salad. The character Cherry is clearly intended to be a homosexual. Throughout the play, Banana makes homophobic comments to Cherry, then eventually reveals to his own homosexuality in a sexual interaction between the two men.

Although the play includes homosexual themes, a departure for Theatre Genesis, many critics have noted that the overall aesthetic of the piece was consistent with the earlier work produced at the theater. Barsha directed the production, and Smith of The Village Voice wrote that it was "vivid, simple and arresting... A bitter, painful, almost despairing vision presented with lightness, fluidity, conciseness and cunning".

== Later history of the theatre ==
Theatre Genesis eventually moved closer to the mainstream. Many off-off-Broadway theaters began being scrutinized by those looking to make a profit and by external funding organizations. In 1966, St. Mark's accepted a $185,000 federal grant brokered by The New School to support the church's art and educational outreach programs, giving each production a budget of $200. Artists were then paid for the work, which was new for off-off-Broadway. The grant eventually led to a troubled relation between Theatre Genesis and external funding. Later in 1966, Cook and Allen refused a large Ford Foundation, and later stopped accepting the New School funding deal due to "excessive entanglement with the government". Cook then had to solicit funding from the Ford Foundation, and the theatre eventually became reliant on this external funding. When that funding was reduced in 1969, the theatre had to cut the season from six shows to three.

Cook left the theater in 1969, leaving it to be co-run by Murray Mednick and Walter Hadler. They operated it as a cooperative for a few more years. David Crespy wrote, "The [East] Village was morphing around them as well... Jazz was being replaced by psychedelic rock, and the long-haired counterculture of 1969 was bringing a less angst-driven energy". Downtown activism was still prevalent, but Joe Cino's death on April 2, 1967 marked a departure from the origins of off-off-Broadway.

== External links ==
- Theatre Genesis on La MaMa Archives Digital Collections
