= Kelly Stuart =

American playwright

- Occupation: Playwright
- Writing career
- Notable awards: Whiting Award (2000)

Kelly Stuart is an American playwright.

== Life ==
She lived in Los Angeles. She has been a New Dramatists writer in residence at The Royal National Theatre’s Studio in London. She lives in New York, and teaches in the Theatre Department at Columbia University.

== Awards ==
- 2000 Whiting Award
- Guthrie New Play grant
- NYFA Fellowship
- Lark Artists Delegation to Romania

== Works ==
- Ball and Chain, produced at the Padua Hills Playwrights Festival (1990)
- The Interpreter of Horror, produced at the Padua Hills Playwrights Festival (1991)
- Demonology, produced at the Padua Hills Playwrights Festival (1995) and at Playwrights Horizons (1996)
- The Square Root of Terrible, produced at The Mark Taper Forum, Los Angeles (1998) (theater for young audiences)
- Furious Blood, produced at Sledgehammer Theatre, San Diego (2001)
- The New New, Guthrie Theater (2002) (one-act play)
- Mayhem, produced at The Evidence Room, Los Angeles (2003)
- The Life of Spiders, produced by Holderness Theatre Company, New York City (2004)
- Homewrecker, produced at The Evidence Room, Los Angeles (2004)
- Bill of (W)Rights, Mixed Blood Theatre, Minneapolis (2004) (one-act as part of evening of short plays)
- Shadow Language, produced at Theatre503, London (2008)
- A Shoe Is Not a Question, presented by the A.S.K. Theater Projects, Los Angeles
