= John O'Keefe (playwright) =

American dramatist

John O'Keefe (born 1940) is an American playwright, director and solo performer. Notable awards include the 2002 Los Angeles Drama Critics Circle Award for Times Like These, and a Bessie Award for Shimmer, which was also made into a motion picture by American Playhouse.

Born in Waterloo, Iowa, in 1940, O'Keefe was raised in a series of Catholic orphanages and juvenile homes. He began singing in church choirs at the age of five and pursued his musical interests, subsequently receiving a vocal scholarship at the University of Iowa, where he earned a BA degree in philosophy and an MFA in theater.

O'Keefe moved to San Francisco in the early 1970s, beginning an affiliation with the Magic Theatre that continues to this day. O'Keefe also co-founded the Blake Street Hawkeyes, a performance-lab ensemble based in Berkeley. He wrote the libretto for Chrysalis, a new opera written with Clark Suprynowicz for the Berkeley Opera in 2006.

== Major works ==
- The Man in the Moon (1983)
- Shimmer (1988)
- The Promotion (1989)
- The Bronte Cycle (2000)
- Times Like These (2002)
