= When the World was Green (a Chef's Fable) =

1996 play written by Sam Shepard

When the World was Green (A Chef's Fable)
- Original language: English
- Written by: Sam Shepard
- Characters: Old Man; Young Woman/Interviewer
- Genre: Drama

Premiere
- Date: 1996

When the World was Green (a Chef's Fable) is a play by Sam Shepard and Joseph Chaikin published in 2007. One of four genre works, the other collaborations include: Tongues (play), Savage/Love and The War in Heaven. In a similar vein, Shepard collaborated with Patti Smith on Cowboy Mouth (play). An extension of the avant-garde theatre, these experimental works provide a framework for dramatic expression.

== Premieres ==
New York's Signature Theatre, devoting their 1996-97 season to Shepard, approached him for a new play. Joseph Chaikin, working as a director with Atlanta's 7 Stages, learned that the theatre had obtained Olympiad funding for the Olympic Arts Festival. Chaikin and Shepard viewed the Festival as a way to deadline their collaboration and present the play before it became part of Signature's retrospective.

The play was commissioned and produced by the Atlanta Committee for the Olympic Games, Cultural Olympiad for the Olympic Arts Festival, in conjunction with 7 Stages, Atlanta, on July 19, 1996.

New York's Signature Theatre Company, opened the play October 22, 1996. The cast featured Alvin Epstein as the Old Man and Aimee Quigly as the Interviewer. This production included Woody Regan as the Pianist with his own original music. The play was presented on a double-bill with Shephard's 1965 play Chicago. It was directed by Joseph Chaikin. The uncoupled play transferred to the American Repertory Theatre (ART), Cambridge, for a March/April 1997 engagement.

== Productions ==
When the World was Green has been performed in numerous instances:

- Magic Theatre, San Francisco, presented the play in April, 1997.
- Sledgehammer Theatre at St. Cecilia's Playhouse, San Diego, presented the play in a February/March 2005 production.
- Cesear's Forum, Cleveland's minimalist theatre, presented the play at Kennedy's Down Under, Playhouse Square in a February/March 2006 production.
- American Stage, St. Petersburg, presented the play in a March/April 2013 production.

== Synopsis ==
An Old Man, who was once a chef, is serving a sentence for murdering a man he mistook for his cousin to avenge a generations-old feud over the poisoning of a mule. A young woman claiming to be a reporter interviews him about the murder. Their eight conversations are interspersed with a sequence of monologues in which both characters recall incidents from their childhood.

== Themes and analysis ==
Sam Shepard is credited with creating a fresh vernacular for exploring the disparity in American life between myth and reality. Joseph Chaikin was both praised and panned for mixing theatrical styles in production.

== Critical reception ==
Ben Brantley in The New York Times was pleased with the performances; "a smooth blend of ritualism and naturalism." Of the play, he wrote: "It's dominant motifs are of exhaustion and sensual pleasure."

Vincent Canby in his Sunday Review, The New York Times article, found the piece, "a squashy, sentimental folk tale...far too orderly and obvious."

Kerry Clawson, in her Akron Beacon Journal review of the Playhouse Square production wrote: "In Chaikin's words, his work with Shepard was 'thought music.' That's an apt term to describe this one-act memory play, which has richly lyrical, sensuous descriptions of both childhood memories and food."
