= List of awards and nominations received by Sam Shepard =

Sam Shepard awards
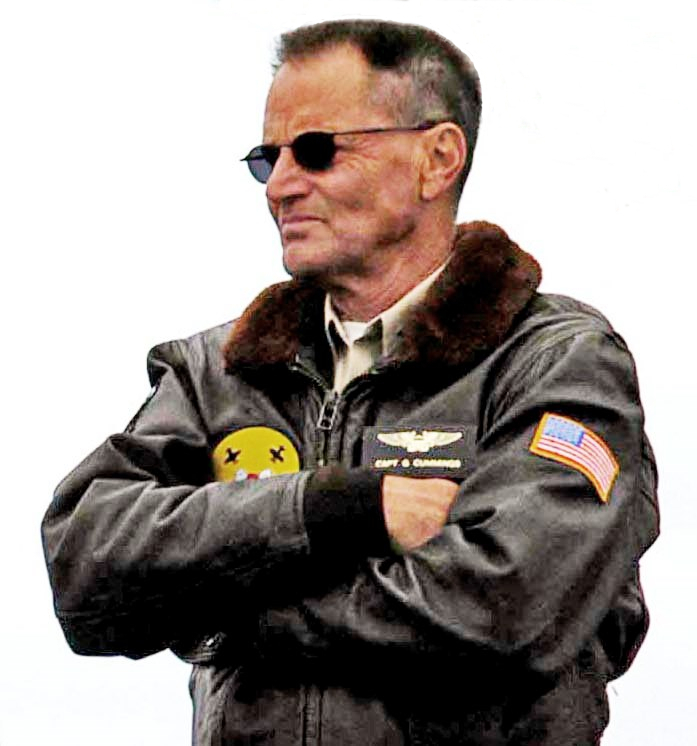
Totals
Award	Wins	Nominations
Academy Awards	0	1
AAAL Awards	1	1
American Theater Hall of Fame	1	1
BAFTA Awards	0	1
Capri/Hollywood Awards	1	1
Cinema Writers Circle Awards	0	1
Critics' Choice Movie Awards	0	1
DFCS Awards	0	1
Drama Desk Awards	1	3
Emmy Awards	0	1
FIS Awards	1	1
Golden Globes	0	1
Gradiva Awards	1	1
Guggenheim Fellowship	1	1
HFF Awards	1	1
Lone Star Film & TV Awards	1	1
Lortel Awards	0	1
NYDCC Awards	1	1
Obie Awards	10	10
Olivier Awards	0	1
OCC Awards	1	1
PEN American Center Awards	1	1
PFCS Awards	0	2
Pulitzer Prizes	1	3
SAG Awards	0	2
TIFF Awards	0	1
Tony Awards	0	2
WAFCA Awards	0	1
Western Heritage Awards	1	1
Awards won	24
Nominations	45

This is a list of awards and nominations received by Sam Shepard. Overall, Sam Shepard, an American playwright and actor, has received 24 awards and 45 nominations.

== Awards and nominations ==
=== Academy Awards ===
Year	Nominated work	Category	Result
1983	The Right Stuff	Best Supporting Actor	Nominated

=== American Academy of Arts and Letters Awards ===
Year	Nominated work	Category	Result
1992	Himself	Gold Medal for Drama	Won

=== American Theater Hall of Fame ===
Year	Nominated work	Category	Result
1994	Himself	Theater Hall of Fame	Won

=== British Academy of Film and Television Arts Awards ===
Year	Nominated work	Category	Result
1984	Paris, Texas	Best Adapted Screenplay	Nominated

=== Capri Hollywood Awards ===
Year	Nominated work	Category	Result
2013	August: Osage County	Ensemble Cast	Won

=== Cinema Writers Circle Awards ===
Year	Nominated work	Category	Result
2012	Blackthorn	Best Actor	Nominated

=== Critics' Choice Movie Awards ===
Year	Nominated work	Category	Result
2013	August: Osage County	Best Acting Ensemble	Nominated

=== Detroit Film Critics Society Awards ===
Year	Nominated work	Category	Result
2013	August: Osage County	Best Ensemble	Nominated

=== Drama Desk Awards ===
Year	Nominated work	Category	Result
1983	True West	Outstanding Play	Nominated
1986	A Lie of the Mind	Outstanding Play	Won
2000	True West	Outstanding Revival of a Play	Nominated

=== Emmy Awards ===
Year	Nominated work	Category	Result
Primetime Emmy Awards
1999	Dash and Lilly	Outstanding Lead Actor in a Miniseries or a Movie	Nominated

=== Film Independent Spirit Awards ===
Year	Nominated work	Category	Result
2013	Mud	Robert Altman Award	Won

=== Golden Globe Awards ===
Year	Nominated work	Category	Result
1999	Dash and Lilly	Best Actor in a Mini-Series or Motion Picture Made for TV	Nominated

=== Gradiva Awards ===
Year	Nominated work	Category	Result
1997	When the World Was Green	Best Play	Won

=== Guggenheim Fellowship Awards ===
Year	Nominated work	Category	Result
1968	Himself	Creative Arts - Drama & Performance Art	Won
1971	Himself	Creative Arts - Drama & Performance Art	Won

=== Hollywood Film Festival Awards ===
Year	Nominated work	Category	Result
2013	August: Osage County	Ensemble of the Year	Won

=== Lone Star Film & Television Awards ===
Year	Nominated work	Category	Result
1997	Lily Dale	Best TV Supporting Actor	Won

=== Lucille Lortel Awards ===
Year	Nominated work	Category	Result
2010	A Lie of the Mind	Outstanding Revival	Nominated

=== New York Drama Critics' Circle Awards ===
Year	Nominated work	Category	Result
1986	A Lie of the Mind	Best Play	Won

=== Obie Awards ===
Year	Nominated work	Category	Result
1966	Chicago	Best Distinguished Play(s)	Won
1966	Icarus's Mother	Best Distinguished Play(s)	Won
1966	Red Cross	Best Distinguished Play(s)	Won
1967	La Turista	Best Distinguished Play(s)	Won
1968	Forensic and the Navigator	Best Distinguished Play(s)	Won
1968	Melodrama Play	Best Distinguished Play(s)	Won
1973	The Tooth of Crime	Best Distinguished Play(s)	Won
1975	Action	Best Playwriting	Won
1977	Curse of the Starving Class	Best New American Play	Won
1979	Buried Child	Best Playwriting	Won
1980	Himself	Sustained Achievement Award	Won
1984	Fool for Love	Best New American Play	Won
1984	Fool for Love	Best Direction	Won

=== Olivier Awards ===
Year	Nominated work	Category	Result
1987	A Lie of the Mind	Play of the Year	Nominated

=== Outer Critics Circle Award Awards ===
Year	Nominated work	Category	Result
1986	A Lie of the Mind	Best Off-Broadway Play	Won

=== PEN American Center Awards ===
Year	Nominated work	Category	Result
2009	Himself	PEN/Laura Pels International Foundation for Theater Award	Won

=== Phoenix Film Critics Society Awards ===
Year	Nominated work	Category	Result
2001	Black Hawk Down	Best Acting Ensemble	Nominated
2013	August: Osage County	Best Acting Ensemble	Nominated

=== Pulitzer Prizes ===
Year	Nominated work	Category	Result
1979	Buried Child	Drama	Won
1983	True West	Drama	Nominated
1984	Fool for Love	Drama	Nominated

=== Screen Actors Guild Awards ===
Year	Nominated work	Category	Result
2007	Ruffian	Outstanding Performance by a Male Actor in a TV Movie or Miniseries	Nominated
2013	August: Osage County	Outstanding Performance by a Cast in a Motion Picture	Nominated

=== Tokyo International Film Festival Awards ===
Year	Nominated work	Category	Result
1993	Silent Tongue	Grand Prix	Nominated

=== Tony Awards ===
Year	Nominated work	Category	Result
1996	Buried Child	Best Play	Nominated
2000	True West	Best Play	Nominated

=== Washington D.C. Area Film Critics Association Awards ===
Year	Nominated work	Category	Result
2013	August: Osage County	Best Acting Ensemble	Nominated

=== Western Heritage Awards ===
Year	Nominated work	Category	Result
2000	Purgatory	Bronze Wrangler for TV Feature Film	Won

== See also ==
- Sam Shepard filmography
