= The Gunfighter =

1950 film by Henry King

- Theatrical release poster
- Directed by: Henry King
- Screenplay by: William Bowers; William Sellers
- Story by: William Bowers; Andre de Toth
- Produced by: Nunnally Johnson
- Starring: Gregory Peck; Helen Westcott; Millard Mitchell; Jean Parker; Karl Malden
- Cinematography: Arthur C. Miller
- Edited by: Barbara McLean
- Music by: Alfred Newman
- Color process: Black and white
- Distributed by: Twentieth Century-Fox
- Release date: June 23, 1950
- Running time: 85 minutes
- Country: United States
- Language: English
- Box office: $1,950,000 (U.S. rentals)

The Gunfighter is a 1950 American Western film directed by Henry King and starring Gregory Peck, Helen Westcott, Millard Mitchell and Karl Malden. It was written by screenwriters William Bowers and William Sellers, with an uncredited rewrite by writer and producer Nunnally Johnson, from a story by Bowers, Roger Corman and Andre de Toth. The film was the second of King's six collaborations with Peck.

The film was nominated for Best Motion Picture Story for William Bowers and Andre de Toth during the 23rd Academy Awards.

== Plot ==
A young, reckless cowboy named Eddie deliberately provokes an argument with notorious gunfighter Jimmy Ringo, who is widely known as the fastest draw in the West, making him the target of young gunslingers eager to become famous. When Eddie draws his pistol, Ringo has no choice but to kill him. Eddie's three brothers seek revenge and pursue Ringo as he leaves town. Ringo ambushes and disarms them before driving away with their horses. He orders them to walk back to town, but they obtain fresh horses and resume their pursuit.

Ringo arrives in the town of Cayenne, where marshal Mark Strett, a reformed gunslinger and Ringo's old friend, urges Ringo to leave town because his presence will cause trouble. Ringo agrees to depart as soon as he finds his wife Peggy, whom he has not seen in eight years, and his son, who does not know that he exists. Strett informs him that Peggy has changed her surname to conceal their relationship and does not wish to see him. Merchant Jerry Marlowe and thug Hunt Bromley resolve to kill Ringo because Marlowe blames him for his son's murder and Bromley desires fame.

Ringo spots Marlowe aiming a rifle at him and disarms him, swearing that he did not kill Marlowe's son. Molly, another of Ringo's old friends, persuades Peggy to talk to Ringo. He tells Peggy that he is weary of life as a gunfighter and wants to settle into a safer lifestyle. He intends to head west to California, or to South America, where people do not know him, and he invites Peggy to accompany him. She refuses but agrees to reconsider one year later if he avoids trouble until then. Ringo meets his son but honors Peggy's wish not to reveal that he is the boy's father.

Ringo's business in Cayenne is finished, but he has lingered too long. The three vengeful brothers try to ambush him outside of the saloon before Strett and his deputies intercept and apprehend them. Ringo bids farewell to Peggy and his son, but Bromley shoots him in the back. As Ringo lies dying, he tells Strett that he had shot first and requests that Bromley should not be arrested or tried for the crime, as Bromley will soon learn that notoriety as a gunfighter is a curse that will follow him wherever he goes.

Strett beats Bromley severely and banishes him from Cayenne, predicting that Bromley will someday meet a violent death. At Ringo's funeral, Peggy reveals to the townspeople for the first time that she was Ringo's wife and sits next to Strett as her husband is buried. A silhouetted, unrecognizable cowboy rides into the sunset.

== Cast ==
- Gregory Peck as Jimmy Ringo
- Helen Westcott as Peggy Walsh
- Millard Mitchell as Marshal Mark Strett
- Jean Parker as Molly
- Karl Malden as Mac
- Skip Homeier as Hunt Bromley
- Anthony Ross as Deputy Charlie Norris
- Verna Felton as Mrs. August Pennyfeather
- Ellen Corby as Mrs. Devlin
- Richard Jaeckel as Eddie
- B. G. Norman as Jimmy Walsh (uncredited)
- Cliff Clark as Jerry Marlowe (uncredited)
- Alan Hale Jr., David Clarke and John Pickard as Eddie's brothers (uncredited)
- Kim Spalding as Tommy Clark (uncredited)
- Eddie Ehrhart as Archie (uncredited)

== Background ==
The film rights to The Gunfighter were purchased by Columbia Pictures, which offered the lead role to John Wayne. However, Wayne declined, despite having expressed a strong desire to play the part, because of his longstanding hatred for Columbia's president Harry Cohn. Bowers had written the role with Wayne in mind but refused to sell the rights to him, hoping to sell it for a higher price. (Bowers said Wayne did offer him $10,000 for the script but the writer felt that was too little and Bowers sold it for $70,000.)

Columbia sold the rights to Twentieth Century-Fox, where the role was awarded to Peck. Wayne's final film, The Shootist (1976), is often compared to The Gunfighter and contains numerous plot similarities.

The script was loosely based on the purported exploits of an actual Western gunfighter named Johnny Ringo, a distant cousin of the outlaw Younger family and enemy of Doc Holliday and the Earp brothers. As in the film, Ringo sought a reconciliation with his estranged family in California in 1882, but unlike the character in the film, his conciliatory gestures were rejected. After a 10-day alcoholic binge, he died of a gunshot wound, probably self-inflicted. Many of the circumstances and legends surrounding Ringo's life and adventures have been challenged in recent years.

The film was directed by Henry King, the second of his six collaborations with Peck. The others included Twelve O'Clock High (1949), David and Bathsheba (1951), The Snows of Kilimanjaro (1952), The Bravados (1958) and Beloved Infidel (1959).

In the original ending, Hunt Bromley is arrested by the town marshal, but studio chief Darryl F. Zanuck was enraged at this resolution, so King and Johnson rewrote the final scene. The studio hated Peck's authentic period mustache. Zanuck, who had been abroad when production began, reportedly said, "I would give $25,000 of my own money to get that mustache off Peck."

== Reception ==
In a contemporary review for The New York Times, critic Bosley Crowther called The Gunfighter "an arresting and quite exciting film" and wrote: "The addicts of Western fiction may find themselves rubbing their eyes and sitting up fast to take notice before five minutes have gone by in Twentieth Century-Fox's 'The Gunfighter' ... For suddenly they will discover that they are not keeping company with the usual sort of hero of the commonplace Western at all. Suddenly, indeed, they will discover that they are in the exciting presence of one of the most fascinating Western heroes as ever looked down a six-shooter's barrel."

Critic Edwin Schallert of the Los Angeles Times praised the film's authenticity and wrote: "By no stretch of the imagination is 'The Gunfighter' a picture that may be set down as a typical western. ... It puts drama above melodrama. But it is not lacking one whit in suspense, and it is occasionally brightly adorned with humor. ... 'The Gunfighter' may definitely be catalogued as one of the year's best."

Variety wrote: "There's never a sag or off moment in the footage ... despite all the tight melodrama, the picture finds time for some leavening laughter. Gregory Peck perfectly portrays the title role, a man doomed to live out his span killing to keep from being killed. He gives it great sympathy and a type of rugged individualism that makes it real."

== Awards ==
The film was nominated for Best Motion Picture Story for writers William Bowers and André de Toth during the 23rd Academy Awards. The film was also nominated for a WGA Award for Best Written American Western.

== Legacy ==
Another version of the story appeared in 1957 in the series The 20th Century Fox Hour entitled "The End of a Gun", with Richard Conte in the role of Jimmy Ringo.

Bob Dylan referenced scenes from The Gunfighter in his song "Brownsville Girl", cowritten by playwright Sam Shepard, which appears on Dylan's 1986 release Knocked Out Loaded. Gregory Peck paid tribute to Dylan's words when Dylan received the Kennedy Center Honors in 1997.

Elmore Leonard features two characters in conversation about The Gunfighter in his novel City Primeval.

=== Remake ===
On February 4, 2025, 20th Century Studios announced plans to develop a remake, with Ethan Hawke and Shelby Gaines writing the screenplay.

== See also ==
- List of American films of 1950
