= Sam Shepard filmography =

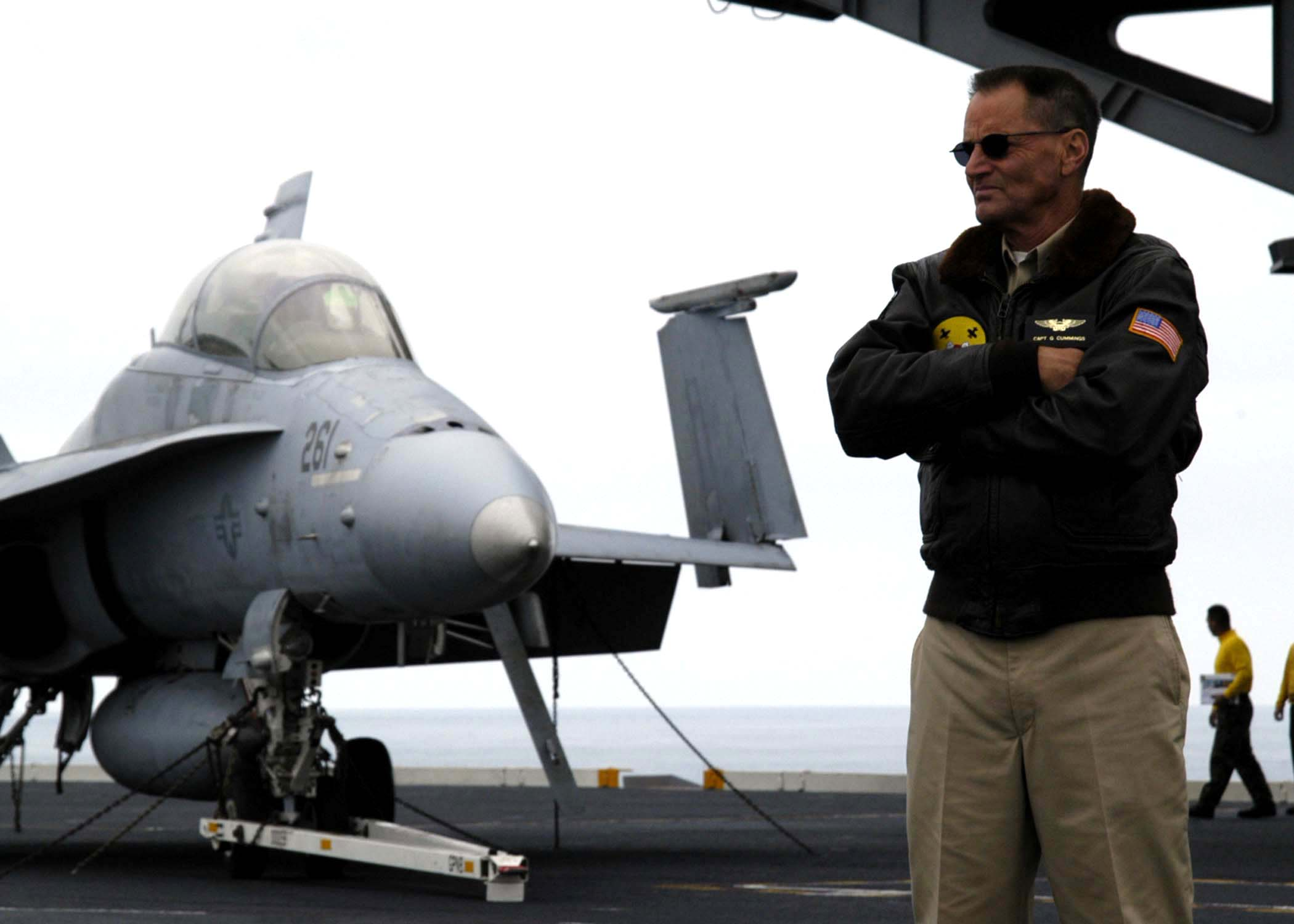
- Shepard on the set of Stealth in 2004
- Born: Samuel Shepard Rogers III; November 5, 1943; Fort Sheridan, Illinois, U.S.
- Died: July 27, 2017 (aged 73); Midway, Kentucky, U.S.
- Occupations: Actor; screenwriter; director; playwright; author
- Years active: 1962–2017

Sam Shepard was an American actor, screenwriter, playwright, director and author. The following is his screen filmography as an actor, screenwriter, and director. Shepard was nominated for the Academy Award for Best Supporting Actor for his role as Chuck Yeager in the film The Right Stuff (1983). The following year, he was nominated for the BAFTA Award for Best Adapted Screenplay for co-writing Paris, Texas (1984). For his role in the television film Dash and Lilly (1999), he was nominated for the Primetime Emmy Award for Outstanding Lead Actor in a Miniseries or a Movie and the Golden Globe Award for Best Actor – Miniseries or Television Film.

== As actor ==
=== Film ===
Year	Title	Role	Notes
1970	Brand X	Unknown	
1978	Renaldo and Clara	Rodeo	Also co-writer
1978	Days of Heaven	The Farmer	
1980	Resurrection	Cal Carpenter	
1981	Raggedy Man	Bailey	
1982	Frances	Harry York	
1983	The Right Stuff	Chuck Yeager	
1984	Country	Gilbert "Gil" Ivy	
1985	Fool for Love	Eddie	Also writer
1986	Crimes of the Heart	Doc Porter	
1987	Baby Boom	Jeff Cooper	
1989	Steel Magnolias	Spud Jones	
1990	Bright Angel	Jack	
1991	Voyager	Walter Faber	Also narrator
1991	Defenseless	Detective Beutel	
1992	Thunderheart	Frank Coutelle	
1993	The Pelican Brief	Thomas Callahan	
1994	Safe Passage	Patrick Singer	
1995	The Good Old Boys	Snort Yarnell	
1997	The Only Thrill	Reece McHenry	
1998	Curtain Call	Will Dodge	
1999	Snow Falling on Cedars	Arthur Chambers	
2000	Hamlet	Ghost	
2000	All the Pretty Horses	J.C. Franklin	
2001	The Pledge	Eric Pollack	
2001	Swordfish	James Reisman	
2001	Black Hawk Down	William F. Garrison	
2002	Leo	Vic	
2003	Blind Horizon	Sheriff Jack Kolb	
2004	The Notebook	Frank Calhoun	
2005	Don't Come Knocking	Howard Spence	Also co-writer
2005	Stealth	George Cummings	
2006	Bandidas	Bill Buck	
2006	Walker Payne	Syrus	
2006	The Return	Ed Mills	
2006	Charlotte's Web	Narrator	Voice
2007	The Assassination of Jesse James by the Coward Robert Ford	Frank James	
2008	The Accidental Husband	Wilder Lloyd	
2008	Felon	Gordon Camrose	
2009	Brothers	Hank Cahill	
2010	Fair Game	Sam Plame	
2010	Inhale	James Harrison	
2011	Blackthorn	Butch Cassidy	
2012	Shepard & Dark	Himself	Documentary
2012	Darling Companion	Sheriff Morris	
2012	Safe House	Harlan Whitford	
2012	Killing Them Softly	Dillon	
2012	Mud	Tom Blankenship	
2013	Savannah	Mr. Stubbs	
2013	August: Osage County	Beverly Weston	
2013	Out of the Furnace	Gerald "Red" Baze	
2014	Cold in July	Ben Russell	
2015	Ithaca	Willie Grogan	
2016	Midnight Special	Calvin Meyer	
2016	In Dubious Battle	Mr. Anderson	
2016	California Typewriter	Himself	Documentary
2017	Never Here	Paul Stark	
2019	Rolling Thunder Revue: A Bob Dylan Story by Martin Scorsese	The Writer	Posthumous release

=== Television ===
Year	Title	Role	Notes
1995	The Good Old Boys	Snort Yarnell	Television film
1996	Lily Dale	Pete Davenport	Television film
1999	Streets of Laredo	Pea Eye Parker	3 episodes
1999	Purgatory	Sheriff Forrest / Wild Bill Hickok	Television film
1999	Dash and Lilly	Dashiell Hammett	Television film
2000	One Kill	Major Nelson Gray	Television film
2000	Great Performances	Narrator	Voice, Episode: "Kurosawa"
2001	After the Harvest	Caleb Gare	Television film
2001	Shot in the Heart	Frank Gilmore Sr.	Television film
2007	Ruffian	Frank Whiteley	Television film
2010	Tough Trade	(Role unknown)	Pilot
2014	Klondike	Father Judge	3 episodes
2015–2017	Bloodline	Robert Rayburn	7 episodes

== As writer ==
=== Film ===
Year	Title	Notes
1969	Me and My Brother	Co-writer
1970	Zabriskie Point	Co-writer
1972	Oh! Calcutta!	Sketch contributions
1978	Renaldo and Clara	Co-writer
1981	Savage/Love	Short film
1982	Tongues	Short film
1984	Paris, Texas	Co-writer
1985	Fool for Love	
1988	Far North	Also director
1994	Silent Tongue	Also director
1994	Curse of the Starving Class	
1999	Simpatico	
2005	Don't Come Knocking	Co-writer
2007	Fool for Love	Short film

=== Television ===
Year	Title	Notes
1974	ITV Saturday Night Theatre	Episode: "Geography of a Horse Dreamer"
1984	American Playhouse	Episode: "True West"
1986	Den sultende klasses forbannelse	Norwegian adaptation of Curse of the Starving Class
1991	Autèntic oest	Spanish adaptation of True West
1991	Loucos Por Amor	Portuguese adaptation of Fool for Love
1995	O Verdadeiro Oeste	Portuguese adaptation of True West
1996	Pazzo d'amore	Italian adaptation of Fool for Love
2002	True West	Adaptation of True West
2004	See You in My Dreams	Adapted from Cruising Paradise and Motel Chronicles

== See also ==
- List of awards and nominations received by Sam Shepard
