= Aukin =

Aukin is a surname. Notable people with the surname include:

- Daniel Aukin (born 1970/1971), British-American theater director
- David Aukin (born 1942), British lawyer, and theatrical and executive producer
