= Daniel Aukin =

British-American theater director

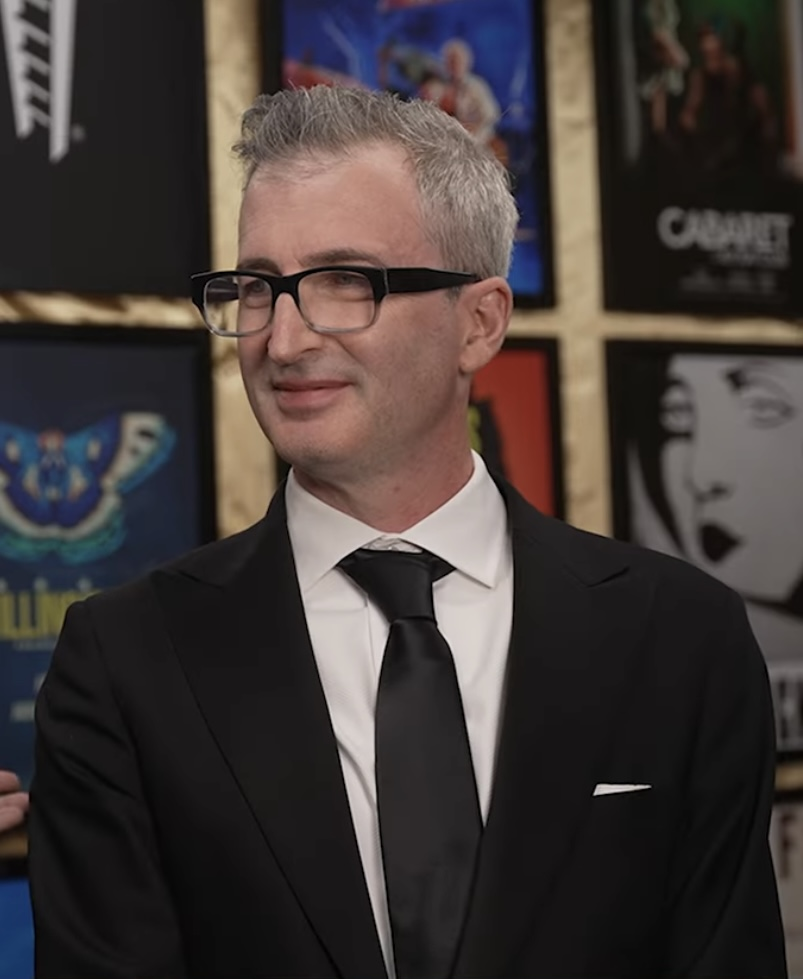
- Aukin at the 77th Tony Awards in 2024
- Born: Daniel Max Aukin; 1970/1971; London, England
- Education: University of Chicago
- Years active: 1999–present
- Parents: David Aukin (father); Nancy Meckler (mother)

Daniel Max Aukin (born 1970/1971) is a British-American theater director. He won the Tony Award for Best Direction of a Play in 2024 for Stereophonic.

== Early life ==
From North London, Aukin was born to English father David Aukin and American-born mother Nancy Meckler, who both work in theatre. His paternal grandparents were Jewish immigrants, his grandfather from Belarus and his grandmother born in Germany of Polish parentage. Aukin studied comparative religion abroad at the University of Chicago. During university, he became interested in student theatre.

== Career ==
Aukin became the artistic director of the SoHo Rep theatre in 1999.

Aukin's directorial debut on Broadway was the 2015 revival of the Sam Shepard play Fool for Love.

== Awards ==
| Year | Work | Award | Category | Result | Ref. |
|---|---|---|---|---|---|
| 2024 | Stereophonic | Lucille Lortel Awards | Outstanding Director | Nominated | |
| 2024 | Stereophonic | Drama League Award | Outstanding Direction of a Play | Won | |
| 2024 | Stereophonic | Drama Desk Award | Outstanding Director of a Play | Won | |
| 2024 | Stereophonic | Tony Awards | Best Direction of a Play | Won | |
