= Sam Waterston on screen and stage =

Catalog of performances by American actor Sam Waterston

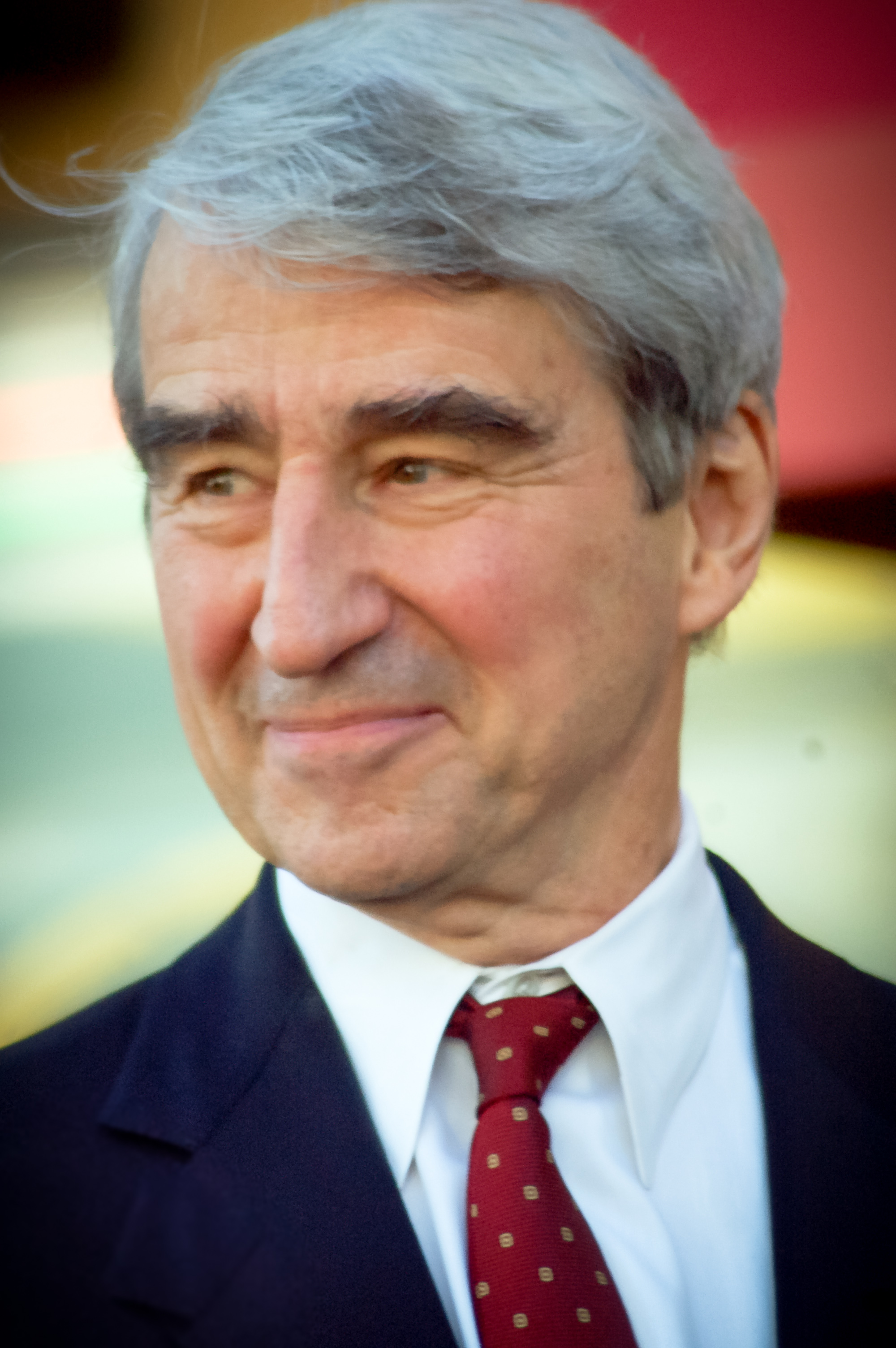
Waterston at his Hollywood Walk of Fame awarding ceremony in January 2010

Sam Waterston is an American actor and producer best known for his portrayal of district attorney Jack McCoy in the long-running police procedural and legal drama television show Law & Order.

Waterston made his film debut in the 1965 drama film The Plastic Dome of Norma Jean. Waterston went on to appear as bond salesman Nick Carraway in the 1974 feature film version of The Great Gatsby, earning Golden Globe nominations for Best Supporting Actor and New Star of the Year. Waterston also portrayed Old West figure Frank Canton in Heaven's Gate (1980). Two years later, Waterston played American journalist Sydney Schanberg in the 1984 British drama The Killing Fields, opposite Haing S. Ngor and John Malkovich. For his performance, Waterston was nominated for an Academy Award for Best Actor.

On television, Waterston played a shoe salesman in the television drama film The Glass Menagerie (1973), receiving a Primetime Emmy Award nomination for Outstanding Supporting Actor in a Drama Series. Waterston's portrayal of American theoretical physicist J. Robert Oppenheimer in the 1980 television miniseries Oppenheimer saw him earn a Golden Globe nomination. He also played the title role of President Abraham Lincoln in the miniseries Lincoln (1988) and the 1990 documentary miniseries The Civil War. He portrayed a district attorney in drama television series I'll Fly Away (1991–93), winning the Golden Globe Award for Best Actor – Television Series Drama. In 1994, he made his first appearance as Jack McCoy in Law & Order. Waterston went on to become the show's second longest-running cast member. The role won him a Screen Actors Guild Award for Outstanding Performance by a Male Actor in a Drama Series and several Emmy and Golden Globe nominations. He has made guest appearances as McCoy on other shows, including Homicide: Life on the Street (1997, 99) and spin-offs Law & Order: Special Victims Unit (2000, '07, '10, '18) and Law & Order: Trial by Jury (2005), and in Exiled: A Law & Order Movie (1998). Waterston portrayed the president of a fictional news corporation on political drama The Newsroom (2012–14).

Waterston has starred in numerous stage productions at the Public Theatre, including Indians (1969), The Trial of Catonsville Nine (1970), A Doll's House (1975), Hamlet (1975), Measure for Measure (1977), and Benefactors (1980). He portrayed Abraham Lincoln on Broadway in Abe Lincoln in Illinois (1993), receiving a nomination for a Tony Award for Best Actor in a Play. Waterston has also appeared in La Turista (1967), Halfway Up the Tree (1967), and Henry IV, Part 1, as well as Henry IV, Part 2 (1968), (1972, 1975–76, 2008), Much Ado About Nothing (1972–73, 2004), The Tempest (1974, 2015), and King Lear (2011).

== Film ==
Year	Title	Role	Notes	Ref(s)
1965	The Plastic Dome of Norma Jean	Andy		
1967	Fitzwilly	Oliver		
1969	Generation	Desmond		
1969	Three	Taylor		
1970	Cover Me Babe	Cameraman	Also known as Run Shadow Run	
1971	Who Killed Mary What's 'Er Name?	Alex		
1972	Savages	James		
1972	Mahoney's Last Stand	Felix	Also known as Mahoney's Estate	
1974	The Great Gatsby	Nick Carraway		
1975	Rancho Deluxe	Cecil Colson		
1975	Journey into Fear	Mr. Graham		
1976	Sweet Revenge	Le Clerq	Also known as Dandy, the All American Girl	
1977	Capricorn One	Lieutenant Colonel Peter Willis, USAF		
1978	Interiors	Mike		
1979	Eagle's Wing	White Bull		
1980	Sweet William	William		
1980	Hopscotch	Joe Cutter		
1980	Heaven's Gate	Frank Canton		
1984	The Killing Fields	Sydney Schanberg		
1985	Warning Sign	Cal Morse		
1986	Hannah and Her Sisters	David	Uncredited	
1986	Just Between Friends	Harry Crandall		
1986	Flagrant désir	Inspector Gerry Morrison	Also known as Trade Secrets	
1987	Des Teufels Paradies	Mr. Jones	Also known as Devil's Paradise	
1987	September	Peter		
1989	Welcome Home	Woody		
1989	Crimes and Misdemeanors	Ben		
1990	Mindwalk	Jack Edwards		
1991	A Captive in the Land	Rupert Royce		
1991	The Man in the Moon	Matthew Trant		
1994	Serial Mom	Eugene Sutphin, DDS		
1995	The Journey of August King	Mooney Wright	Also producer	
1995	Nixon	Richard Helms	Scenes featured only in the director's cut version	
1996	The Proprietor	Harry Bancroft		
1997	Shadow Conspiracy	President of the United States		
2003	Le Divorce	Chester Walker		
2003	The Commission	J. Lee Rankin		
2014	Please Be Normal	Dad		
2015	Anesthesia	Professor Walter Zarrow		
2016	Miss Sloane	George Dupont		
2018	On the Basis of Sex	Erwin Griswold		
2024	The Six Triple Eight	President Roosevelt		
2026	Carousel	TBA		

== Television ==
Year(s)	Title	Role	Notes	Ref(s)
1965	Dr. Kildare	Mark	2 Episodes	
1967	N.Y.P.D.	Marco	Episode: "Murder for Infinity"	
1973	Much Ado About Nothing	Benedick	Television film	
1973	The Glass Menagerie	Tom Wingfield	Television film	
1974	Reflections of Murder	Michael Elliott	Television film	
1979	Friendly Fire	C. D. B. Bryan	Television film	
1980	Oppenheimer	J. Robert Oppenheimer	7 episodes; Miniseries; First broadcast in the United States in 1982	
1982	Q.E.D.	Prof. Quentin Everett Deverill	6 episodes	
1982	Games Mother Never Taught You	David Bentells	Television film	
1982	Freedom to Speak	Theodore Roosevelt	12 episodes; Miniseries	
1983	In Defense of Kids	Paul Wilcox	Television film	
1983	Dempsey	Doc Kearns	Television film	
1984	The Boy Who Loved Trolls	Ofoeti	Television film	
1985	Finnegan Begin Again	Paul Broadbent	Television film	
1985	Love Lives On	Bernie	Television film	
1986	The Fifth Missile	Captain Allard Renslow	Television film	
1986	Amazing Stories	Jordan Manmouth	Episode: "Mirror, Mirror"	
1987	The Room Upstairs	Travis Coles	Television film	
1988	Terrorist on Trial: The United States vs. Salim Ajami	Jim Delmore	Television film	
1988	Lincoln	Abraham Lincoln	Miniseries	
1989	The Nightmare Years	William L. Shirer	Miniseries	
1990	Lantern Hill	Andrew Stuart	Television film	
1990	The Civil War	Abraham Lincoln	Voice role; 9 episodes; Miniseries documentary	
1991–1993	I'll Fly Away	Forrest Bedford	38 episodes; Also directed episode "Since Walter" (1992)	
1992	Warburg: A Man of Influence	Siegmund Warburg	Miniseries	
1993	Tales from the Crypt	G. G. Devoe	Episode: "As Ye Sow"	
1993	I'll Fly Away: Then and Now	Forrest Bedford	Television film	
1994	Assault at West Point	Daniel Chamberlain	Television film	
1994	David's Mother	John Nils	Television film	
1994	The Enemy Within	President William Foster	Television film	
1994–2010, 2022–2024	Law & Order	Jack McCoy	405 episodes	
1997, 1999	Homicide: Life on the Street	Jack McCoy	Episodes: "Baby, It's You", "Sideshow"	
1998	Miracle at Midnight	Doctor Karl Koster	TV movie	
1998	Exiled: A Law & Order Movie	Jack McCoy	TV movie	
2000	Family Guy	Doctor Bruce Kaplan	Voice roles; 2 Episodes	
2000	A House Divided	David Dickson	Television film; Also producer	
2000–2018	Law & Order: Special Victims Unit	Jack McCoy	4 episodes	
2002	The Matthew Shepard Story	Dennis Shepard	Television film	
2005	Law & Order: Trial by Jury	Jack McCoy	Episodes: "The Abominable Snowman", "Skeleton"	
2007	Masters of Science Fiction	Robert Havelmann	Episode: "A Clean Escape"	
2009	The National Parks: America's Best Idea	Reader	2 episodes	
2011	Prohibition	Reader	3 episodes; Miniseries documentary	
2012–2014	The Newsroom	Charlie Skinner	25 episodes	
2013	Jo	David Zifkin	Episode: "Le Marais"	
2015–2022	Grace and Frankie	Sol Bergstein	Netflix; 94 episodes	
2017	Godless	Marshal John Cook	Netflix Limited series	
2022	The Dropout	George Shultz	Hulu Limited series	
2026	Line of Fire	President Thomas Barnes	2 episodes	

== Narrator ==
Year	Title	Notes	Ref(s)
1987	Nova	Episode: "Freud Under Analysis"	
1988	American Experience	Episode: "Views of a Vanishing Frontier"	
1995	Lost Civilizations	Documentary	
1999	The Unfinished Journey	Documentary short film	
1999	Moment of Impact: Stories of the Pulitzer Prize Photographs	Documentary	
2010	The Last Boat Out	Documentary short film	
2013	The Path to Violence	Documentary	
2013	Cooper & Hemingway: The True Gen	Documentary	
2015	Dateline: Saigon	Documentary	
2020	Gatsby in Connecticut: The Untold Story	Documentary	

== Theater ==
Year	Title	Role	Venue	Ref(s)
1962	Oh Dad, Poor Dad, Mamma's Hung You in the Closet and I'm Feelin' So Sad	Bellboy	Phoenix Repertory Theatre	
1963	As You Like It	Silvius	Delacorte Theater	
1963	Oh Dad, Poor Dad, Mamma's Hung You in the Closet and I'm Feelin' So Sad	Jonathan	Morosco Theatre	
1963	Thistle in My Bed	Wessy	Gramercy Arts Theatre	
1964–66	The Knack	Colin (Note: Waterston acted as a replacement actor for Roddy Maude-Roxby.)	New Theatre	
1966	Fitz/ Biscuit	Woodfin (Fitz)	Circle in the Square Theatre	
1967	La Turista	Kent	Theater at St. Clement's Church	
1967	Posterity for Sale	Aburbio	Theater at St. Clement's Church	
1967	Halfway Up the Tree	Robert	Brooks Atkinson Theatre	
1968	Ergo	Aslan	Joseph Papp Public Theater / Anspacher Theater	
1968	Muzeeka / Red Cross	Jack Argue (Muzeeka) / Jim (Red Cross)	Provincetown Playhouse	
1968	Henry IV, Part 1	Prince Hal	Delacorte Theater	
1968	Henry IV, Part 2	Prince Hal	Delacorte Theater	
1969	Spitting Image	Gary Rogers	Lucille Lortel Theatre	
1969–70	Indians	John Grass	Brooks Atkinson Theatre	
1970	Hay Fever	Simon Bliss	Helen Hayes Theatre	
1971	The Trial of the Catonsville Nine	Thomas Lewis	Lyceum Theatre	
1971	The Tale of Cymbeline	Cloten	Delacorte Theater	
1972	Hamlet	Laertes	Delacorte Theater	
1972–73	Much Ado About Nothing	Benedick	Winter Garden Theatre	
1974	The Tempest	Prospero	Mitzi E. Newhouse Theater	
1975	A Doll's House	Torvald Helmer	Vivian Beaumont Theater	
1975	Hamlet	Prince Hamlet / Ghost	Delacorte Theater	
1975–76	Hamlet	Prince Hamlet	Vivian Beaumont Theater	
1976	Measure for Measure	Duke Vincentio	Delacorte Theater	
1977	Chez Nous	Phil	Stage 73	
1980–81	Lunch Hour	Oliver	Ethel Barrymore Theatre	
1982	Gardenia	Joshua Hickman	Stage 73	
1982–83	Three Sisters	Aleksandr Ignatyevich Vershinin	New York City Center	
1985–86	Benefactors	David Kitzinger	Brooks Atkinson Theatre	
1988	A Walk in the Woods	John Honeyman	Booth Theatre	
1989	Love Letters	Andrew Makepeace Ladd III (Note: Waterston acted as a replacement actor for John Rubenstein.)	Promenade Theatre	
1990–91	The Master Builder	Halvard Solness	Hartford Stage	
1993–94	Abe Lincoln in Illinois	Abraham Lincoln	Vivian Beaumont Theater	
2004	Much Ado About Nothing	Governor Leonato	Delacorte Theater	
2005	Travesties	Henry Carr	Long Wharf Theatre	
2008	Hamlet	Polonius	Delacorte Theater	
2009	Have You Seen Us?	Henry Parsons	Long Wharf Theatre	
2010	Have You Seen Us?	Henry Parsons	Folger Theatre	
2011	The Old Masters	Bernard Berenson	Long Wharf Theatre	
2011	King Lear	King Lear	Joseph Papp Public Theater / Newman Theater	
2015	The Tempest	Prospero	Delacorte Theater	
