= Killer's Head =

- A 1976 performance of Killer's Head
- Original language: English
- Written by: Sam Shepard
- Characters: Mazon
- Genre: Drama
- Setting: an execution chamber

Premiere
- Date: 15 April 1975
- Place: The American Place Theatre; New York City

Killer's Head is a 1975 absurdist play by Sam Shepard. It is a one-act monologue by Mazon, a California man about to be executed by electric chair. Mazon contemplates in stream of consciousness fashion his would-be future while he waits for the switch to be flipped.

== Production history ==
Killer's Head was performed at The American Place Theatre in New York, as part of a double bill with Shepard's play Action. Nancy Meckler directed, and Richard Gere starred. The play received mixed reviews, critics generally preferring Action. John Simon in New York Magazine panned it as "a bright idea that should have been put out of its misery before it put us into ours." That year, Shepard also directed a performance of the play, also a double bill with Action, at The Magic Theatre in San Francisco.

The play was revived in 1997 by the Signature Theatre Company, with Action and a new play, The Sad Lament of Pecos Bill on the Eve of Killing His Wife. Here, the role of Mazon was played by a rotating cast of actors, one per week, including John Diehl. Jamey Sheridan, Bill Pullman, Treat Williams, Scott Glenn, and Dermot Mulroney. The play's last performances starred Ethan Hawke.
