= Brownsville Girl =

Song by Bob Dylan

from the album Knocked Out Loaded
- Released: July 1986
- Recorded: May 1986
- Genre: Folk rock; country; talking blues
- Length: 11:05
- Label: Columbia
- Songwriters: Bob Dylan; Sam Shepard
- Producer: Bob Dylan

"Brownsville Girl" is a song by the American singer-songwriter Bob Dylan. It was recorded in May 1986 and released on his album Knocked Out Loaded in July the same year. It is notable for its length, over 11 minutes, and for being co-written by playwright Sam Shepard. The song is a reworked version of a December 1984 outtake from the Empire Burlesque sessions entitled "New Danville Girl". It was anthologized on the compilation albums Bob Dylan's Greatest Hits Volume 3 in 1994 and Dylan in 2007.

== Background and composition ==
Dylan's hero Woody Guthrie wrote and recorded a version of the song "Danville Girl" which includes the lyrics "Got stuck on a Danville girl ... she wore that Danville curl", lyrics that are echoed in "Brownsville Girl". The similarity to "Danville Girl" is more obvious in "New Danville Girl", the first version of the song that Dylan had recorded for 1985's Empire Burlesque. That version was not officially released until it appeared on The Bootleg Series Vol. 16: Springtime in New York 1980–1985 in 2021.

Lyrically, "Brownsville Girl" features a first-person narrator speaking to an ex-lover, one presumably from years gone by. He speaks of her wistfully, even though it is clear he is with someone else now, and muses that his current partner reminds him of his former flame (he says she has the "same dark rhythm in her soul"). The singer often interrupts his reminiscences of the mysterious "Brownsville Girl" to describe the plot of a western movie starring Gregory Peck that he saw once (but believes he 'sat through it twice'). The plot of the film, about a young upstart who shoots an aging gunslinger, and then is warned by the dying man that now he must watch his own back, sounds like 1950's The Gunfighter. It is possible, however, that the song refers to multiple Gregory Peck films: 1946's Duel in the Sun is about two brothers in Texas fighting for the love of a dark beauty named Pearl Chavez, and the song's narrator mentions standing in line to see a movie starring Peck even though "it's not the one that I had in mind".

== Reception and legacy ==
Although Knocked Out Loaded received poor reviews upon release, "Brownsville Girl" is considered one of Dylan's best songs by some critics. Music critic Robert Christgau praised "Brownsville Girl" as "one of the greatest and most ridiculous of Dylan's great ridiculous epics. Doesn't matter who came up with such lines as 'She said even the swap meets around here are getting pretty corrupt' and 'I didn't know whether to duck or to run, so I ran' — they're classic Dylan".

In a 1987 interview, Lou Reed noted his admiration for the song, stating: "the thing Dylan did with Sam Shepherd, 'Brownsville Girl', I mean, I think that is one of the greatest things I ever heard in my life. I fell down laughing. You can listen to that, you can listen to the words going on and it’s tremendous."

Gregory Peck himself quoted "Brownsville Girl" in a speech at the Kennedy Center Honors in 1997 when Dylan was being awarded The Dorothy and Lillian Gish Prize. Peck's speech concluded with him recalling the first time he heard the song: "Dylan was singing about a picture that I made called The Gunfighter about the lone man in town with people comin' in to kill him and everybody wants him out of town before the shooting starts. When I met Bob, years later, I told him that meant a lot to me and the best way I could sum him up is to say Bob Dylan has never been about to get out of town before the shootin' starts. Thank you, Mr. Dylan, for rocking the country...and the ages".

The Big Issue placed the song first on a 2021 list of the "80 best Bob Dylan songs - that aren't the greatest hits" (in spite of the fact that it is included on Bob Dylan's Greatest Hits Volume 3) and called it the "Ulysses of music, an 11-minute ramble...about nothing and everything, epic and ridiculous". A 2021 Guardian article included it on a list of "80 Bob Dylan songs everyone should know".

Bonnie "Prince" Billy, who covered it live in 2012, named "Brownsville Girl" as his all-time favorite Bob Dylan song in a 2021 Stereogum article, writing, "The song is concrete, cathartic and epic, humorous and charming. It rolls across unmapped territories and hints at a way of realizing musical ideas that has yet to be pursued since by anyone, anywhere, including by Bob Dylan".

Leonard Cohen cited it as one of his favorite songs of all time in Jim Devlin's book Leonard Cohen: In His Own Words.

== Live performance ==
Dylan has only performed the song live once, a partial version at a concert in Paso Robles, California on August 6, 1986.

== Notable cover ==
Comedian/singer Reggie Watts covered the song in a truncated dancehall version for the 2014 compilation Bob Dylan in the 80s: Volume One, a version referred to by Consequence of Sound as "surprisingly great".
