= Miriam Chaikin =

Writer and poet (1924–2015)

- מרים חייקין
- Born: 1924; Jerusalem
- Died: April 15, 2015 (aged 90–91)
- Occupations: Editor, writer
- Relatives: Joseph Chaikin
- Writing career
- Genres: Children's literature Poetry
- Subjects: Jewish people Judaism; Jewish mythology Jewish history
- Notable awards: Sydney Taylor Book Award; National Jewish Book Award

Miriam Chaikin (Hebrew: מרים חייקין; 1924 to April 15, 2015) was a writer of children's books and poetry and published at least 35 books during her lifetime. She often wrote about Jewish life. She was awarded the Sydney Taylor Book Award and the National Jewish Book Award.

== Biography ==
Chaikin, known as "Molly" to her family, was born in Jerusalem in 1924. Her family emigrated to the United States in 1925, and she grew up in Brooklyn. Her family lived in "very humble" circumstances.

Chaikin worked for the Israeli paramilitary organization Irgun in their American branch, then as a secretary to Members of Congress, and then as a book editor. She lived part of the time in Israel. In New York City, she lived at Westbeth Artists Community in the West Village.

As a writer of at least 35 children's books, she focused on Jewish life. She also published poetry and a book about Jerusalem.

Her brother, Joseph Chaikin, was an actor and director, and one of her sisters, Shami Chaikin, was an actor. Her niece, also Miriam Chaikin, is an anthropologist.

Chaikin died on April 15, 2015, at the age of 90.

== Books and critical reception ==
Margaret Yatsevitch Phinney has described Chaikin's aim as "to acknowledge children's common, but troublesome feelings of isolation and loneliness, and to let them know others have had the same feelings". Phinney also notes that Chaikin's intent, "particularly in her later books, is to illuminate and record the history, traditions, and values of the Jewish people", and to remember the Holocaust.

I Should Worry, I Should Care (1979) is described in the School Library Journal: "One of a plethora of books about being young, Jewish, and living in Brooklyn pre-World War II, this has a pleasant warmth about it and, in spite of the fact that nothing much happens, what does makes good reading. ... Death, poverty, the dark shadows of anti-Semitism all threaten Molly's world, but they don't disrupt childhood's preoccupations. You don't have to be Jewish to like this one." Chaikin continued the story of Molly into other books; The New York Times described Friends Forever (1988) as "the fifth in a pleasing series about Molly, a nice Jewish girl growing up in Borough Park, Brooklyn, before World War II. In this installment she and her friends in the 6B class must take the exam for the Rapid Advancement class in junior high school".

Chaikin's other series, the Yossi books, was described by Liz Rosenberg in The New York Times as part of a movement towards innocence and "cheerful fiction". Yossi is a Hasidic Jewish boy.

Ask Another Question: The Story and Meaning of Passover (1985) was described in the School Library Journal as notable because it covered Passover internationally and because of the "emphasis on women's roles in the development and presentation of the holiday". The New York Times wrote that "The Exodus story here is full of human details, and reveals the participants as understandable people rather than remote mythic figures".

Of A Nightmare in History: The Holocaust, 1933-1945 (1987), a review in the School Library Journal said that it "spares readers little".

Exodus (1987), a re-telling of the Book of Exodus, won the National Jewish Book Award. A review in the School Library Journal said that "Chaikin's dignified text and Mikolaycak's magnificent bold illustrations make this a treasure for all ages and religions".

The School Library Journal said that Menorahs, Mezuzas, and Other Jewish Symbols (1990) "succeeds admirably both in covering the whole range of Jewish symbols and in presenting their underlying ideas with clarity and succinctness, distilling the scholarship (attested to by seven pages of notes and two pages of reference books) into a form easily comprehended by the intended audience".

Chaikin wrote three collections of Midrash stories, Clouds of Glory: Legends and Stories about Bible Times (1998), Angels Sweep the Desert Floor: Bible Legends about Moses in the Wilderness (2002) and Angel Secrets: Stories Based on Jewish Legend (2005). Mary M. Burns, writing in The Horn Book Magazine, gave Clouds of Glory a star to indicate "a book that the majority of reviewers believe to be an outstanding example of its genre, of books of this particular publishing season, or of the author's body of work". Burns wrote that the book's "language that seems to reflect the tone of those long-ago rabbinical discussions", and that "the personalities here are familiar reflections, of ourselves, and the stories underline a common bond. Specific documentation adds the appropriate scholarly touch". The New York Times thought that the book "perhaps inevitably - greatly oversimplifies Jewish theology in her effort to depict a Supreme Being who is simultaneously all-powerful, all-merciful and yet sufficiently exasperated by human evil to destroy mankind in the Flood". Ilene Cooper, writing in Booklist, said of Angels Sweep the Desert Floor that Chaikin "does a good job of mixing religious history with tenents of Judaism and framing everything as folklore, right at a child's level". Publishers Weekly described Angel Secrets as an "entertaining collection" based on Midrash tales, and said that "An informative introduction, source notes and references may encourage further reading in this area". Margaret Yatsevitch Phinney wrote that Angel Secrets, although "informative", "with its many stories about angels and their conflicts, seems to wander without a purpose".

Of the historical novel Alexandra's Scroll: The Story of the First Hanukkah (2002), set at the time of the Maccabees, Publishers Weekly said that "Chaikin's (Clouds of Glory) research, as always, is meticulous, but Alexandra often seems more a conduit for that research than a flesh-and-blood character". Kirkus Reviews described the heroine as "a plucky young girl with 21st-century attitudes".

Aviva's Piano (1986) is set in Kibbutz Kfar Giladi; the book deals with terrorism and the family home is bombed. A stage production of the book led to the creation of the Young Actors for Young Audiences program at the Dora Wasserman Yiddish Theatre.

Joyce Antler has written about Chaikin's 1987 re-telling of The Book of Esther in terms of how Jewish women are portrayed; she notes that Chaikin's text does not judge Esther.

Chaikin was interested in haiku. Her 2002 Don't Step on the Sky: A Handful of Haiku collection for small children, illustrated by Hiroe Nakata, was reviewed in Publishers Weekly: "moves easily between whimsy ("Duck glides across pond--/ water doesn't notice") and wistfulness ("Lovely lily/ alive for only a day./ Take good care of yourself"), and Nakata's (Lucky Pennies and Hot Chocolate) watercolors accommodate both. Through the pages, a girl in overalls and her cat go exploring, blissfully alone in meadows of wildflowers and cityscapes dotted with rows of street lamps".

== Awards ==
- Sydney Taylor Book Award, 1985, Association of Jewish Libraries, for her body of work
- Notable Book, 1987, American Library Association, for A Nightmare in History: The Holocaust, 1933-1945
- National Jewish Book Award, 1988, for Exodus
- Notable Book, 1988, American Library Association, for Exodus

== Legacy ==
The Miriam Chaikin Endowment Fund for Writing was set up in her memory in 2016.

== Selected works ==
=== The Molly series ===
- I Should Worry, I Should Care (1979), illustrated by Richard Egielski, Harper, New York
- Finders Weepers (1980), illustrated by Richard Egielski, Harper, New York
- Getting Even (1982), illustrated by Richard Egielski, Harper, New York
- Lower! Higher! You're a Liar! (1984), illustrated by Richard Egielski, Harper, New York
- Friends Forever (1988), illustrated by Richard Egielski, Harper, New York

=== The Yossi series ===
- How Yossi Beat the Evil Urge (1983), illustrated by Petra Mathers, Harper, New York
- Yossi Asks the Angels for Help (1985), illustrated by Petra Mathers, Harper, New York
- Yossi Tries to Help God (1987), illustrated by Denise Saldutti, Harper, New York
- Feathers in the Wind (1989), illustrated by Denise Saldutti, Harper, New York

=== Other books ===
- Ittki Pittki (1971), illustrated by Harold Berson, Parents' Magazine Press, New York
- The Happpy Pairr and Other Love Stories (1972), illustrated by Gustave Nebel, Putnam, New York
- Hardlucky (1973), illustrated by Fernando Krahn, Lippincott, Philadelphia
- The Seventh Day: The Story of the Jewish Sabbath (1979), illustrated by David Frampton, Doubleday, New York
- Shake a Palm Branch: The Story and Meaning of Sukkot (1984), illustrated by Marvin Friedman, Clarion, New York
- Ask Another Question: The Story and Meaning of Passover (1985), illustrated by Marvin Friedman, Clarion, New York
- Aviva's Piano (1986), illustrated by Yossi Abolafia, Clarion New York
- Sound the Shofar: The Story and Meaning of Rosh Hashanah and Yom Kippur (1986), illustrated by Erika Weihs, Clarion, New York
- Esther (1987), illustrated by Vera Rosenberry, Jewish Publication Society
- Exodus (1987), illustrated by Charles Mikolaycak, Holiday House, New York
- Hinkl and Other Shlemiel Stories (1987), illustrated by Marcia Posner, Shapolsky Publishers
- A Nightmare in History: The Holocaust, 1933-1945 (1987), Clarion, New York
- Hanukkah (1990), illustrated by Ellen Weiss, Holiday House, New York
- Menorahs, Mezuzas, and Other Jewish Symbols (1990), illustrated by Erika Weihs, Clarion, New York
- Clouds of Glory: Legends and Stories about Bible Times (1997), illustrated by David Frampton, Clarion, New York
- Don't Step on the Sky: A Handful of Haiku (2002), illustrated by Hiroe Nakata, Henry Holt, New York
- Angels Sweep the Desert Floor: Bible Legends about Moses in the Wilderness (2002), illustrated by Alexander Koshkin, Clarion, New York
- Alexandra's Scroll: The Story of the First Hanukkah (2002), illustrated by Stephen Fieser, Henry Holt, New York
- Jewish Wisdom for Daily Life: Sayings of Rabbi Menahem Mendl of Kotzk (2014), with translations by Gabriel Lisowski, Arcade Publishing
- Jerusalem: an Informal Biography of the City (2015), CreateSpace Independent Publishing Platform
