= Nancy Meckler =

American-born theatre and film director

- Born: 1941 (age 84–85)
- Occupations: Theater director, film director
- Spouse: David Aukin (m. 1969)
- Children: 2

Nancy Meckler is an American-born director, known for her approach to theatre, specifically her work in the United Kingdom with Shared Experience, where she was a joint artistic director alongside Polly Teale. Educated in the US and England, she has directed for a number of prominent theatres, including the Globe Theatre, the Royal National Theatre, and the Royal Shakespeare Company. She has also directed feature films such as Sister My Sister, and Alive and Kicking/Indian Summer.

== Early life and education ==
Meckler is native to Long Island, New York. It was there that she began to take interest in the arts, though directing was not her original passion; at first she wanted to be an actor. She was initially attracted to theatre because of its ability to expose audiences to new and different worldviews. Meckler attended several academic institutions in the US, beginning with Antioch College for her undergraduate degree, then moving on to study acting at HB Studios. Finally, she obtained a master's degree in Performance Theory and Criticism from NYU. Meckler also spent a year in London training at the London Academy for the Dramatic Arts.

After this, her focus slowly moved to directing; she realized she did not want to be in the spotlight, but still had a strong interest in theatre. Her future directorial pursuits were greatly steered by the New York avant-garde scene of the 1960s; her influences at the time included Jerzy Grotowski, a prominent experimental and avant-garde figure of the era. She moved to London in 1968, a time when many American artists were relocating to the UK, permanently changing the theatre scene in the places they landed.

== Career ==
Once in the UK, Meckler founded the Freehold Theatre Company (1968–72), which, while it did not last long, had a successful and recognized production of the play Antigone. In 1970, Antigone was sent by the British Council to represent the UK at BITEF and the Venice Biennale. The Freehold Theatre Company won the John Whiting Award for New Writing in 1970.

Freehold Theatre Company disbanded after Meckler started her family, but she returned to theatre shortly after, becoming the associate director at Hampstead Theatre. During this time, Meckler struggled with the constraints of directing traditional scripted plays and the structure of British theatre, as her work in the past had been more creative and experimental. In 1984, Meckler and her husband, David Aukin, who she had been working with at Hampstead, relocated to Leicester Theatre in London. There, Meckler went on to direct the plays of Shakespeare and other period playwrights, but alongside that, she returned to her more experimental pursuits through freelance directing.

Meckler was the first woman to direct at the Royal National Theatre, with Edward Albee's Who's Afraid of Virginia Woolf? in 1981.

She was the artistic director of Shared Experience Theatre, a fringe theatre company in London, from 1988 to 2011. The company is known for its non-traditional approaches to theatre, namely their tendency to stage well known plays in a way that has not been done before.

Meckler has directed 5 plays at the Royal Shakespeare Company as well as King Lear at Shakespeare's Globe.

== Directing credits ==
=== As a Freelance Director 1972–2000 ===
- Eight Sam Shepard plays (including world premieres of Killers Head, Action, Curse of the Starving Class, and A Particle of Dread: Oedipus Variations)
- Uncle Vanya by Anton Chekov – Hampstead Theatre, 1979.
- Dusa, Fish, Stas and Vi by Pam Gems – Hampstead Theatre and West End, 1976.
- Sufficient Carbohydrate by Dennis Potter – Hampstead Theatre and West End, 1984.
- Low Level Panic by Clare McIntyre – Royal Court Theatre Upstairs and Lyric Hammersmith, 1988.
- St Joan by George Bernard Shaw – Cambridge Theatre Company tour.
- Rose by Martin Sherman – National Theatre and Broadway (Lincoln Centre, 2000).

=== Artistic Director of Shared Experience Theatre 1988-2011 ===
- The Bacchae – Edinburgh Festival, UK tour, 1988.
- Abingdon Square by Maria Irene Fornes – Soho Poly (1989), National Theatre (1990).
- The Birthday Party by Harold Pinter – UK tour, 1990.
- Anna Karenina adapted by Helen Edmundson – UK tour and World tour, 1992.
- Mill on the Floss adapted by Helen Edmundson (co-director Polly Teale) – UK tour and World Tour, 2001.
- War and Peace adapted by Helen Edmundson (co-director Polly Teale) – UK tour, National Theatre, 2008.
- A Passage to India adapted by Martin Sherman - UK tour, BAM Next Wave Festival, New York, 2004.
- Bronte by Polly Teale – Watermill, UK tour, Tricycle Theatre.

=== Freelance director 2011 – present ===
==== With the Royal Shakespeare Company ====
- House of Desires
- Romeo and Juliet
- The Comedy of Errors
- All's Well that Ends Well
- The Heresy of Love by Helen Edmundson
- A Midsummer Night's Dream

===== Other =====
- King Lear – Shakespeare's Globe 2017.

== Filmography ==
Meckler has directed two films, Sister My Sister (1994) and Indian Summer (aka Alive & Kicking) (1996). Both films contain LGBTQ+ subject matter, Robin Griffiths has categorized Sister My Sister as a notable queer British film. Reviewers described Meckler's direction as theatrical; her experience as a stage director clearly present in her on screen work. Various reviewers interpreted this style of directing in different ways, with some saying it adds to the films, and others saying it detracts from them.

Sister My Sister, Meckler's most popular film, falls into a common trope of killer or murderous queer people, with the main characters, two sisters working as maids, plotting to kill their employer. However, Meckler's work stands out from others in this trope because it was directed by a woman; this is uncommon for the genre. The film portrays a controversial relationship, an incestuous lesbian romance between two sisters.

== Ballet ==
Meckler was the director of A Streetcar Named Desire for the Scottish Ballet.

== Awards ==
- The Mill on the Floss
  - Helen Hayes Award, Outstanding Visiting Production, 2001 (Kennedy Centre)
- Anna Karenina
  - Best Touring Show TMA/Martini, 1993
  - Outstanding Theatrical Event, Time Out awards, 1992
  - Best Foreign Theatre Company, Diario Clarín, Buenos Aires, 1992
- Sister My Sister
  - Best Feature, Turin Film Festival, 1995
  - Public Prize; Best New Director; Youth Prize : Valladolid Film Festival, 1994
- Alive and Kicking
  - Opening Film, Locarno Film Festival, 1996
  - Most Popular Film, Hamptons Film Festival, 1996
  - Audience Award Best Film, London Film Festival, 1997
  - Grand Prix, Luchon Film Festival, 1999
- A Streetcar Named Desire
  - Best Dance Production, Southbank Awards, 2012
  - Best Dance Production Nominee, Olivier Awards, 2012

== See also ==
- List of female film and television directors
- List of LGBT-related films directed by women
