= Action (play) =

Play by Sam Shepard

- Written by: Sam Shepard
- Characters: Shooter; Jeep; Liza; Lupe
- Original language: English
- Genre: Drama

Premiere
- Date premiered: 1974
- Place premiered: Royal Court Theatre Upstairs, London

Action is a 1974 play by Sam Shepard. The play, which scholar Stephen J. Bottoms described as "stark" and "plotless", is considered by scholars to be among his most important works. It has been compared to the work of Samuel Beckett.

== Production history ==
Action was first performed at the Royal Court Theatre Upstairs, London, in October 1974, directed by Nancy Meckler. The original cast was as follows:

- Shooter – Steven Moore
- Jeep – Stephen Rea
- Liza – Jill Richards
- Lupe – Jennifer Stoller

The play was also performed at New York's American Place Theatre with a companion piece, Shepard's monologue Killer's Head, premiered with it as a double bill.

In 1975, Sam Shepard directed a revival of the play at the Magic Theater in San Francisco, where he was artist in residence.

== Plot summary ==
Action follows two men and two women stuck in a house on Christmas, after some implied disastrous event has taken place in the world. They attempt to cook a holiday dinner and perform other domestic rituals, from the mundane like hanging laundry, to the absurd like tap dancing and pretending to be bears.
