= Savage/Love =

Savage/Love is a play by Sam Shepard and Joseph Chaikin. It does not have the standard narrative structure of a play and is instead made up of poems.
