= Icarus's Mother =

Play written by Sam Shepard

Icarus' Mother
- Written by: Sam Shepard
- Original language: English
- Genre: Drama

Premiere
- Date premiered: 1965

Icarus' Mother is a one-act play by Sam Shepard.

It was first staged at the Caffe Cino in 1965, directed by Michael Smith, a drama critic, with a cast that included John Coe, a veteran of the Living Theatre. It was included in the first published collection of Shepard's play scripts, entitled Five Plays (1966).

== Overview ==
As the play opens, a group of five people (three men, two women) are digesting a big picnic meal and belching. They are lying on a lawn near a beach, while waiting for a fireworks display to begin. Although the characters don't specifically mention the Fourth of July, a number of patriotic references are used. A jet plane is flying overhead. Various kinds of funny but tense conflicts, word games, and mind games take place among the group. Two of the men, Howard and Bill, seem to be conspiring against the others. They send up smoke signals three times from a barbecue while the others are absent and hide the fact that they're doing this. There's no explanation as to why they're sending up the signals or what the signals are supposed to mean. The two women, Pat and Jill, who have been off stage, return to boast that they have been stripping and shimmying, in an attempt to distract the jet pilot. Just as the fireworks begin, the jet plane crashes nearby, sending the other man, Frank, into an extended verbal spasm, indicating he may be on drugs or has lost his mind. His lengthy monologue contains some inspired poetry, especially among Shepard's early plays. At the end of his speech Frank staggers off stage, deeply lost and confused, while bellowing that he has just seen something memorable and historic. Pat and Jill run across the stage, announcing wildly that the jet plane has crashed. Possibly frightened and trying to comfort each other, although they could just as easily be gloating about their success, Howard and Bill silently hold hands and stare at the audience, as the offstage fireworks continue and the play ends.
