= Joseph Chaikin =

American dramatist

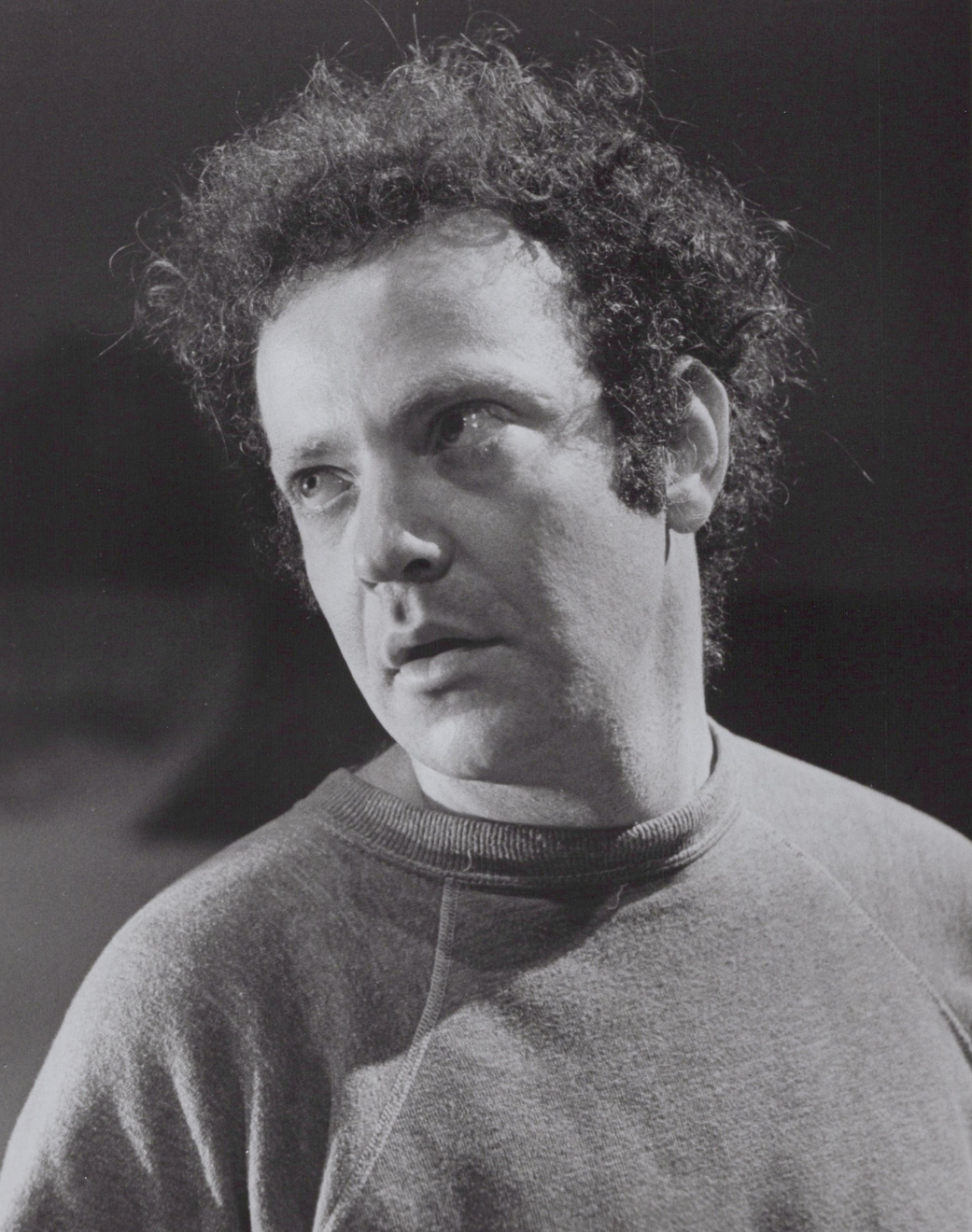
- Chaikin in 1970
- Born: 16 September 1935; Brooklyn, New York, USA
- Died: 22 June 2003 (aged 67); New York City, New York, USA
- Occupations: Theatre director, actor, playwright, pedagogue
- Relatives: Miriam Chaikin

Joseph Chaikin (September 16, 1935 – June 22, 2003) was an American theatre director, actor, playwright, and pedagogue.

== Early life and education ==
The youngest of five children, Chaikin was born to a poor Jewish family living in the Borough Park neighborhood of Brooklyn. At the age of six, he was struck with rheumatic fever, and he continued to suffer from resulting heart complications throughout his life. At the age of ten, he was sent to the National Children's Cardiac Hospital in Florida. It was during this period of isolation he began to organize theater games with other children. After two years in Florida, his health improved, and he was returned to his family, who had moved to Des Moines, Iowa, where his father had taken a job teaching.

Chaikin briefly attended Drake University in Iowa, and then returned to New York to begin a career in theater, studying with various acting coaches, while struggling to survive working a variety of jobs. He appeared as a figurant at the Metropolitan Opera, and gradually began to be cast in legitimate stage roles, going on to work with The Living Theatre before founding in 1963 The Open Theater a theater co-operative that progressed from a closed experimental laboratory to a performance ensemble.

== Career ==
The Open Theater allowed Chaikin and his colleagues the space to experiment with unconventional and organic drama techniques. They embraced dance and musical performance practices and encouraged actors to be more expressive in the body. When asked in a 1999 interview why he was compelled to start the Open Theater, Chaikin responded, "I’m not crazy about naturalism on stage. An actor is an interpretive artist. They can take their talent further. I wanted them to stretch, be creative."

The Open Theater's most famous and critically acclaimed production, The Serpent, was developed largely from the actors' own experiences, using the Bible, particularly the Book of Genesis as text, but incorporating current events, such as the political violence of the 1960s, such as the assassination of John F. Kennedy.

An Open Theater exercise by Jean-Claude van Itallie, "Interview" became part of the play America Hurrah, and Chaikin directed the "Interview" section when the play opened at the Pocket Theatre in 1966. In 1969 the Open Theater performed Endgame by Samuel Beckett, with Chaikin playing the role of Hamm and Peter Maloney as Clov, at the Cite Universitaire, Paris, and in 1970 at the Grasslands Penitentiary, a fulfillment of Chaikin's desire to experiment with audiences who would be fundamentally and culturally different from cosmopolitan audiences.

In 1970-71 the Open Theater performed Terminal by Susan Yankowitz, touring the production internationally—including at the Shiraz Arts Festival in Iran (1971)--as well as to many maximum and minimum security prisons in the eastern U.S. and Canada. The Open Theater operated for about ten years. Chaikin closed the Open Theater in 1973 because he said it was in danger of becoming an institution. Although it achieved much critical success, Chaikin said: "I have rarely known a case where a critic's response to actors, directors or writers has expanded or encouraged their talent- I have known cases where by panning or praising, the critic has crushed or discouraged creative inspiration".

In 1977, Chaikin formed an experimental workshop company called The Winter Project, whose members included Ronnie Gilbert, Corey Fischer, Robbie McCauley, Mark Samuels, Robert Montgomery, Christopher McCann, and Will Patton, as well as core members of the previous Open Theatre, among others. In the Winter Project, Chaikin proposed and participated in explorations of the boundary between life and death, the actor as storyteller, listening, found dialogue and more.

His production of The Dybbuk at the Public Theater in 1977-78 was, to some extent, influenced by some of these researches. Chaikin had a close working relationship with Sam Shepard and they co-wrote the plays Tongues and Savage/Love, both of which premiered at San Francisco's Magic Theatre. They were commissioned to write When The World Was Green for the 1996 Olympics in Atlanta, Georgia, later collaborating to write The War in Heaven. Chaikin was an expert on Samuel Beckett.

Chaikin adapted Texts for Nothing with Steven Kent who directed him in a solo show based on the material which performed at the Public Theater in New York, at the Roundhouse Theatre in London, the American Center in Paris, and in Toronto. Chaikin directed a number of Beckett's plays, including Endgame at the Manhattan Theatre Club and Happy Days at Cherry Lane Theater.

== Awards and honors ==
- Chaikin received six Obie Awards, including one for Lifetime Achievement, and two Guggenheim Fellowships.
- His book The Presence of The Actor was first published in 1972 by Theatre Communications Group, and a second edition followed in 1991. Based on his experiments with actors, the book includes exemplar notes, photographs, and exercises from Open Theatre productions, and records Chaikin's ideas about theater as a tool for social transformation.
- In 2010, he was inducted, posthumously, into the American Theater Hall of Fame.

== Personal life ==
In 1984, Chaikin suffered a stroke during his third open-heart surgery, which left him with partial aphasia. Following this, several writers, including Jean-Claude van Itallie, Susan Yankowitz, and Sam Shepard, wrote plays specifically for Chaikin to perform and direct, including The War in Heaven (by Chaikin and Shepard), which was directed by Steven Kent. Chaikin performed the piece in San Diego, Atlanta, and Parma, Italy. Samuel Beckett's last poem, "What Is the Word?", was written for and dedicated to Chaikin.

Chaikin was a lifelong teacher of acting and directing, and lived most of his adult life in New York's West Village, at Westbeth Artists Community. His sisters included the children's writer Miriam Chaikin, and Shami Chaikin, an actor. Chaikin died from heart failure on 22 June 2003.
