= Geography of a Horse Dreamer =

Play by Sam Shepard

- Original language: English
- Written by: Sam Shepard
- Characters: Cody; Beaujo; Santee; Fingers; The Doctor; The Waiter; Jasper; Jason
- Genre: Drama
- Setting: two hotel rooms, one sleazy and one fancy

Premiere
- Date: 21 February 1974
- Place: Theatre Upstairs; London

Geography of a Horse Dreamer is a play by Sam Shepard.

== Production history ==
Geography of a Horse Dreamer was first performed at the Theatre Upstairs in London, on 21 February 1974. The cast was as follows:

- Cody – Stephen Rea
- Beaujo – Bob Hoskins
- Santee – Kenneth Cranham
- Fingers – Neil Johnston
- The Doctor – George Silver
- The Waiter – Alfred Hoffman
- Jasper – Bill Bailey
- Jason – Raymond Skipp
- Directed by Sam Shepard

Geography of a Horse Dreamer was revived by the Zoo Theatre Company in NYC in 1987. Directed by Chris Cavalier, it starred Dusko Petkovich as Santee, and Tony DeRiso as Beaujo.

== Plot summary ==
The play is in two acts. In the first act (entitled "The Slump"), which takes place in a sleazy hotel room, apparently in the United States, Cody is chained to a bed, where he is being watched by two gangsters, Beaujo and Santee. A radio announces the action at a local race track for horses. Cody keeps begging the gangsters to unlock him from the bed, but they refuse because they're afraid he'll try to escape. The audience learns that Cody was kidnapped by the gangsters because he has the ability to predict the winners of races in his dreams – they refer to him as a "dreamer." Cody finally talks them into unlocking him for a short time, and some attempted escapes take place, but Cody is stopped. The gangsters complain that Cody has lost his ability to predict winners, and they keep wondering what their bosses are going to do to him. By the end of the first act, the pressure has mounted on Cody, and he begins to regain his ability to predict winners, although they are in dog races.

The second act (entitled "The Hump") takes place in a much fancier hotel room, apparently in England. The gangsters are still watching Cody, but he is unchained from his bed. Although Cody picked a long series of winners in dog races, bringing in a lot of money for the gangsters and their bosses, he has since cooled down, and he is again being threatened. The gangsters' boss, Fingers, shows up with the Doctor. They are about to perform surgery on Cody, cutting the "dreamer bone" out of his neck, which allows him to dream winners – this will kill Cody, but the Doctor says that the bone can be inserted in someone else's neck, and that person will become a "dreamer." Just as they are about to cut Cody apart, the hotel room is invaded by Cody's two brothers, Jasper and Jason, who shoot all of the gangsters with shotguns. The two brothers are dressed as farmers. They rescue Cody and leave with him. Once they are gone, a Waiter comes in to see if anyone wants to order food. He hardly seems concerned that the gangsters are lying wounded on the floor. One of them asks the Waiter to play a record, which had been Cody's favorite, and which he was always asking the gangsters to play on a record player, but they wouldn't. The Waiter puts on the record, a zydeco tune (Shepard names a specific record in the script), and it plays, as the play ends.

== Character summaries ==
Cody is an unpredictable, kidnapped cowboy who dreams the winners of races. Beaujo is a Chicago gangster with a heart of gold, Santee's side-kick. Santee is the aggressive partner of Beaujo in surveying the titular Horse Dreamer, Cody....

== Text ==
- Shepard, Sam (2006). Fool for Love and Other Plays. New York: The Dial Press. ISBN 0-553-34590-7.
