= David Aukin =

English theatre manager (born 1942)

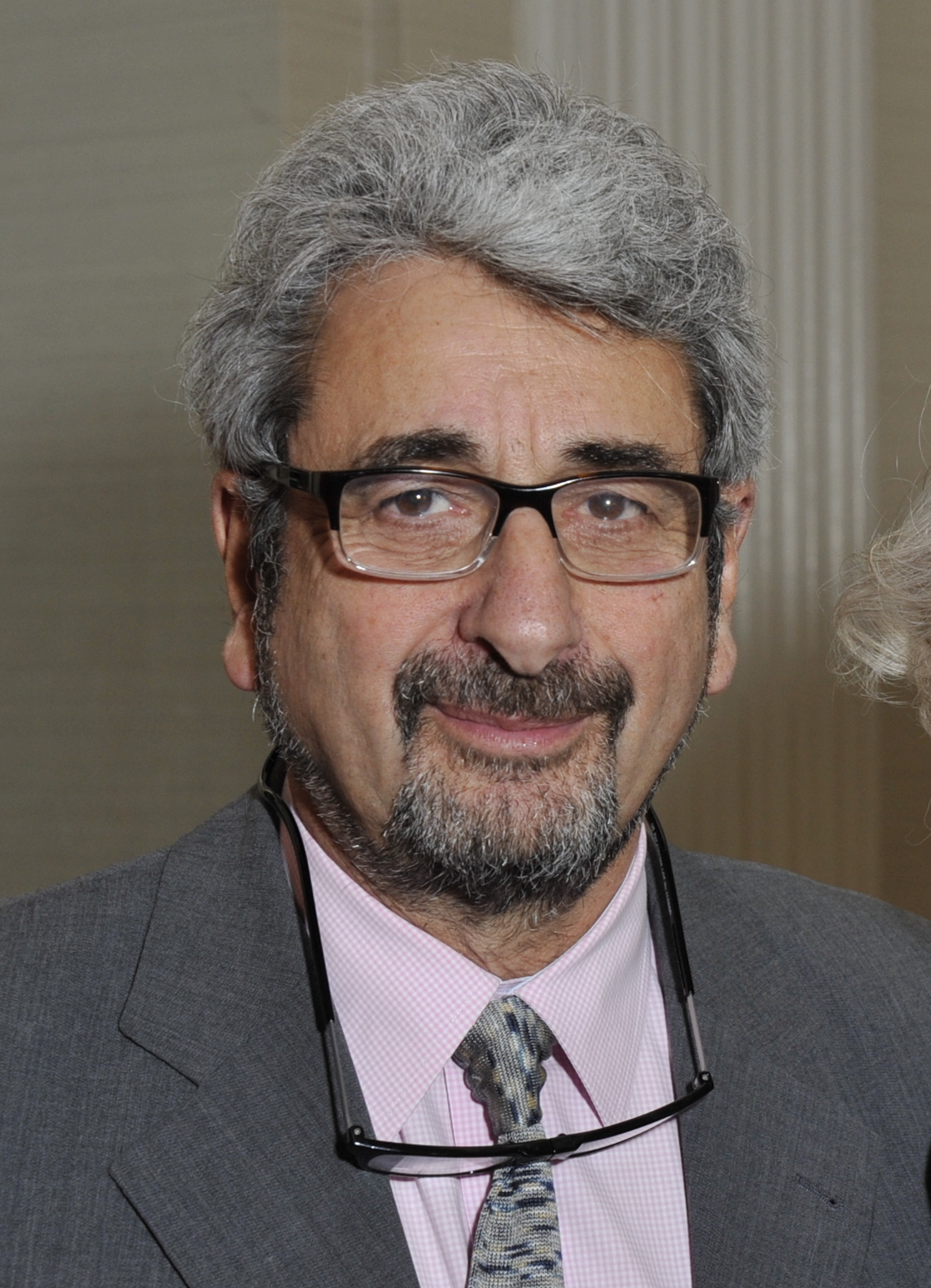
- Aukin in 2010
- Born: 12 February 1942 (age 84); Harrow, London, England
- Education: St Edmund Hall, Oxford
- Years active: 1970–present
- Spouse: Nancy Meckler (m. 1969)
- Children: 2; including Daniel

David Aukin (born 12 February 1942) is an English theatrical and executive producer as well as a qualified solicitor. He has been nominated for multiple British Academy Television Awards and has won twice for producing films about Tony Blair: The Government Inspector in 2005 and Britz in 2009. While Head of Film at Channel 4 he received the Michael Balcon Award from BAFTA for the quality of its output. The films he commissioned at Channel 4 gathered numerous Oscar nominations and they won for the Madness of King George, Secrets & Lies and Trainspotting. Secrets & Lies also won the Palme d'Or at Cannes Film Festival.

== Early life ==
David Aukin was born in Harrow, London, on 12 February 1942, to Jewish parents Charles, born in Belarus, and Regina (née Unger), born in Germany of Polish parentage. Aukin attended St Paul's School and studied Law at St Edmund Hall, Oxford, intending to follow in his father's footsteps.

== Theatrical career ==
David Aukin served as the literary adviser at the Traverse Theatre (1970–73). From 1970 to 1974, he served as Chairman of the Oval House Arts Centre. Along with David Hare and Max Stafford-Clark, Aukin co-founded the Joint Stock Theatre Company in 1974. During this period he presented The Open Theatre and two seasons of Le Grand Magic Circus all at the Roundhouse Theatre and presented numerous fringe companies in the UK and abroad, including The Freehold, The People Show, Pip Simmons Theatre Group and the premiere of Pam Gems' first stage play at the Cockpit Theatre. From 1974 through 1975, Aukin was an administrator with Anvil Productions in Oxford. In 1975, Aukin became an administrator at the Hampstead Theatre. Three years later he was appointed to the position of Artistic Director there, a position he held until 1984. The numerous premiers he produced there include Translations by Brien Friel, Abigail's Party, Goose-Pimples, and Ecstasy, all by Mike Leigh, The Hothouse written and directed by Harold Pinter and Dusa Fish Stas and Vi by Pam Gems. He was then appointed artistic director of the Haymarket Theatre, Leicester where he premiered Me and My Girl which went on to win many awards on the West End and Broadway. In 1986 he was appointed executive director of the National Theatre which he ran with Richard Eyre until 1990 when he was headhunted to be Head of Film at Channel 4. He subsequently has produced intermittently in the West End, including Dance of Death with Ian McKellen, and Onassis by Martin Sherman with Robert Lindsay. In 2002, Aukin produced the Broadway revival of The Elephant Man.

== Film work ==
From 1990 to 1998 he was Head of Film at Channel 4, during which time he commissioned over 100 feature films including Trainspotting, The Madness of King George, Secrets & Lies, Shallow Grave, Four Weddings and a Funeral, Brassed Off, and films by Ken Loach, Peter Greenaway, Tony Harrison and many others. In 2005, Aukin was the executive producer of The Government Inspector, a television drama about the death of David Kelly. The film was described by Rupert Smith in The Guardian as "...television drama in excelsis, hitting all the right buttons – action, comedy, pathos, satire – as well as having shedloads of righteous political anger...", though Mark Lawson criticised its portrayal of Tony Blair strumming a guitar while "sending men to their deaths on the telephone". Aukin responded by insisting that the scene had been misinterpreted. The film went on to win the 2005 BAFTA Award for Best Single Drama. At the 2007 BAFTA awards, two of Aukin's works were nominated: The Trial of Tony Blair for Best Single Drama and Britz which won Best Drama Serial.

He executive produced Endgame which won a 2009 Peabody Award. He also produced or executive produced The Promise, The Hamburg Cell, A Very Social Secretary, Mrs Henderson Presents, Hyde Park on Hudson, and True History of the Kelly Gang.

== Personal life ==
Aukin married Nancy Meckler in 1969. They have two children, Daniel Aukin and Jethro Aukin, whom they raised in North London.
