= The Tooth of Crime =

1972 musical play by Sam Shepard

- Original language: English
- Written by: Sam Shepard
- Characters: Hoss; Becky Lou; Star-Man; Galactic Jack; Referee; Cheyenne; Doc; Crow
- Genre: Musical Play, Drama

Premiere
- Date: 17 July 1972
- Place: Open Space, London

The Tooth of Crime is a musical play written by Sam Shepard which made its premiere in London's Open Space Theatre on July 17, 1972. It tells the story of aging rock singer Hoss, doing battle with rival Crow.

== Plot ==
The play is set in a vaguely described science fiction future dominated by "The Game," a conflation of rock music and violence played by "Markers" under the direction of "The Keepers." Hoss has struggled to become the top Marker, only to find himself doubting his own abilities in the face of opposition from "Gypsies" who operate outside of the official rules.

Act 1: Eager to make an outing, Hoss is frustrated when the Star-Man advises him against it on the basis of his astrology. Hoss learns that his rival, Mojo Root Force, has encroached upon his territory in Las Vegas in a move of questionable legality. After getting word that a Gypsy from Vegas is on his way to attack him, Hoss calls an old friend, Little Willard, for backup, only to find that Willard has committed suicide due to his inability to cope with his status. These successive revelations exacerbate Hoss's self-doubt and his belief that the old way is dying, and he attempts to perk up his confidence by challenging the Gypsy to a shiv fight.

Act II: Before the duel (which has been changed from a shiv fight to battle of words under the guidance of an official referee) Hoss and Crow attempt to psych each other out. While Crow learns to imitate Hoss's walk and style, Hoss intimidates Crow by taking on the voice of an old Western gunslinger. Despite an ostensibly effective second round in which he takes on the voice of a Delta bluesman, Hoss loses the battle when Crow exposes Hoss's "Fear that he's crackin' busted in two." After killing the Ref, a desperate Hoss begs Crow to teach him the new style. Ultimately, however, he decides to commit his last authentic act by killing himself, for which Crow commends him. The play ends with Crow assuming his place on Hoss' throne, with Becky quickly shifting her loyalty.

== Characters ==
- Hoss – The world's top Marker, he is worried that the younger Gypsies are aiming to usurp his position. He often takes on the dialects of past myths, such as a Western gunfighter, a 1920s gangster, and a Delta blues singer. He resembles "a mean Rip Torn."
- Crow – An upstart Gypsie Marker seeking to dethrone Hoss. He constantly speaks in a stylish, newfangled dialect. He is described as looking like The Rolling Stones guitarist Keith Richards.
- Becky Lou – Hoss's girlfriend/manager.
- Star-Man – An astrologer who advises Hoss.
- Galactic Jack – A disc jockey who advises Hoss by looking in the charts. He dresses like a pimp and speaks like Wolfman Jack.
- Cheyenne Hoss's driver and friend.
- Doc Hoss's drug supplier/physician.
- A Referee

== Production history ==
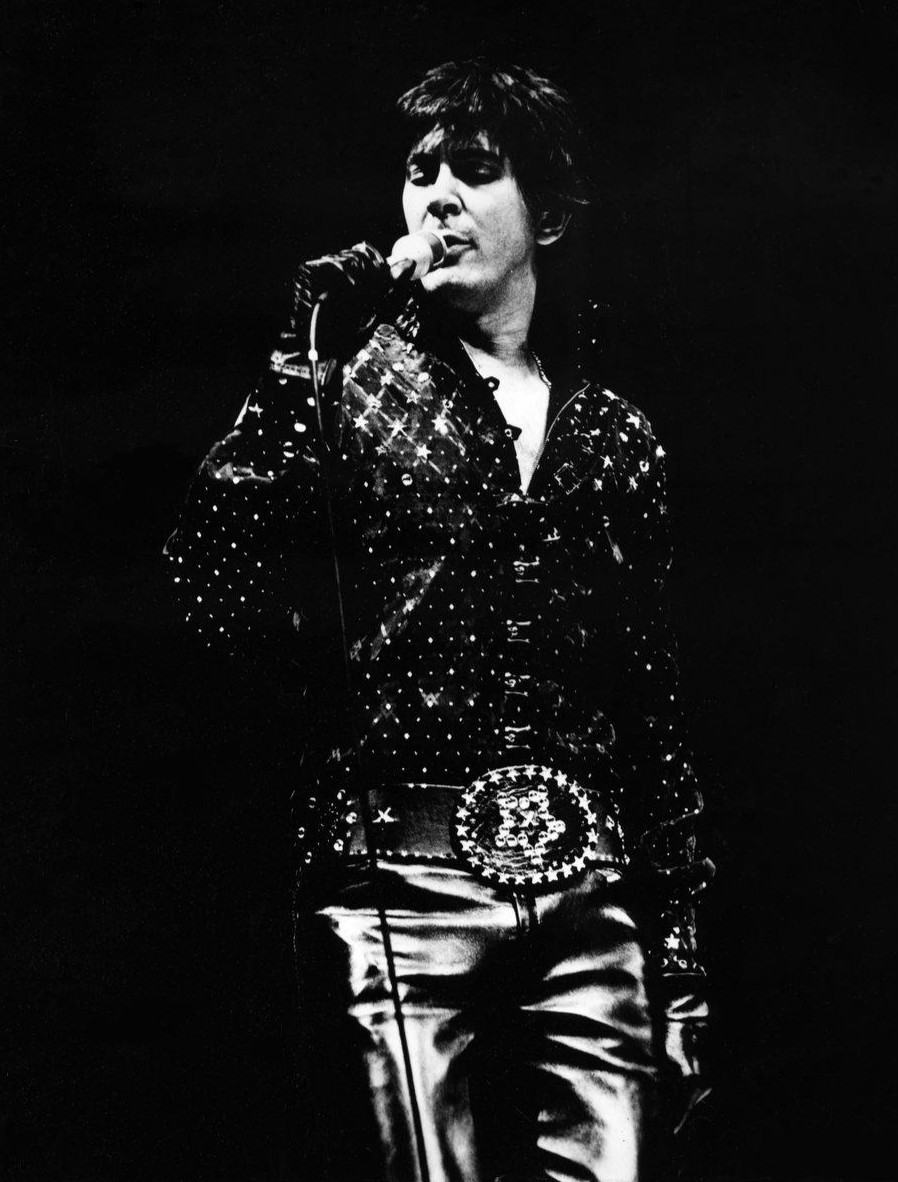
Frank Langella as Hoss in the 1972 McCarter Theater production

The Tooth of Crime was first performed at the Open Space, London on July 17, 1972. The cast included:

- Hoss – Malcolm Storry
- Becky Lou – Petronella Ford
- Star-Man – Michael Weller
- Galactic Jack – Tony Milner
- Cheyenne – Tony Sibbalt
- Doc – John Grillo
- Crow – Dave Schofield
- Directed by Charles Marowitz.

Shepard originally wrote the music for the play, which was performed by a group called Blunderpuss.

The Tooth of Crime had its American premiere at the McCarter Theater in November 1972.

The American cast of The Performance Group in 1973 included:

- Galactic Max and Doc - Stephen Borst
- Floss - Spalding Gray
- Cheyenne - James Griffiths
- Star and Ref - Elizabeth LeCompte
- Becky - Joan MacIntosh
- Crow - Timothy Shelton

In 1996, Shepard revised the play as Tooth of Crime: Second Dance (minus "The"), and the score was rewritten by T-Bone Burnett. This version premiered in December 1996 at the Lucille Lortel Theater in Manhattan, directed by Bill Hart, and starring Vincent D'Onofrio and Kirk Acevedo. The New York Times' Ben Brantley questioned "if Mr. Shepard's changes in the script improve or mar it."

The original script was revived in 2006 for a production at LaMama E.T.C. (La MaMa Experimental Theatre Club), in New York, as part of La MaMa's 45th-anniversary season. Directed by George Ferencz, it was a restaging of Ferencz's 1983 concert-style production, using many of the same cast members. According to The New York Times, this production "[made] a compelling case for 'The Tooth of Crime' as one of Mr. Shepard’s best plays ... and perhaps the best American drama on the cancerous nature of fame."
