= Knocked Out Loaded =

Studio album by Bob Dylan
- Released: July 14, 1986
- Recorded: 1984–1986
- Studios: Delta Recording Studio (New York); The Church Studios (London); Topanga Skyline Studio (Los Angeles); Sound City Studios (Los Angeles)
- Genre: Rock
- Length: 35:18
- Label: Columbia
- Producer: Bob Dylan

Bob Dylan chronology
Biograph (1985)	Knocked Out Loaded (1986)	Down in the Groove (1988)

Bob Dylan studio album chronology
Empire Burlesque (1985)	Knocked Out Loaded (1986)	Down in the Groove (1988)

Knocked Out Loaded is the twenty-fourth studio album by American singer-songwriter Bob Dylan, released on July 14, 1986 by Columbia Records.

The album was received poorly upon release, and is still considered by some critics to be one of Dylan's least-engaging efforts. However, the 11-minute epic "Brownsville Girl", co-written by Sam Shepard, has been cited as one of his best songs by some critics. Sales for Knocked Out Loaded were weak, as it peaked at No. 53 on U.S. charts and No. 35 in the UK. The album's highest chart position was in Norway, where it peaked at No. 9.

== Composition ==
The album includes three cover songs, three collaborations with other songwriters and two solo compositions by Dylan. Most of the album was recorded in the spring of 1986, although recording or mixing work on one track, "Got My Mind Made Up", reportedly occurred in June. Several tracks from the album used overdubbing to build on instrumental tracks from 1984 and 1985 sessions.

One song, "Maybe Someday", paraphrases a line from T. S. Eliot's poem Journey of the Magi: Eliot's "And the cities hostile and the towns unfriendly" becomes in Dylan "Through hostile cities and unfriendly towns".

== Packaging ==
Artist Rick Griffin, primarily known for the Grateful Dead's logos and poster art, was initially commissioned to design the cover of the record jacket. Griffin's work featured Marlon Brando's character from The Wild One and the working title All Jacked Up. Griffin's artwork sold at auction in 2008 for $7,350.

Dylan ultimately rejected Griffin's design in favor of a reworking of the January 1939 cover of the pulp magazine Spicy Adventure Stories. The album's inner sleeve includes a long list of special thanks, acknowledging musicians who performed on the album (such as Tom Petty), musicians who did not (Stevie Wonder), surreal characters ("Gal Shaped Just Like A Frog"), and Dylan's youngest daughter ("Desiree"), who was born the year of the album's release.

== Reception and legacy ==
Professional ratings
Review scores
Source	Rating
AllMusic	2/5 stars
Robert Christgau	B
The Encyclopedia of Popular Music	2/5 stars
Entertainment Weekly	B−
MusicHound	1.5/5
The Rolling Stone Album Guide	1/5 stars
Rolling Stone	3/5 stars

Knocked Out Loaded received mixed to negative reviews from contemporary music critics, who found the album uneven and lacking cohesion. "Knocked Out Loaded is ultimately a depressing affair," wrote Anthony DeCurtis in his review for Rolling Stone magazine, "because its slipshod, patchwork nature suggests that Dylan released this LP not because he had anything in particular to say, but to cash in on his 1986 tour. Even worse, it suggests Dylan's utter lack of artistic direction."

In a more positive review for The Village Voice, Robert Christgau wrote Knocked Out Loaded "sounds like something Dylan threw together in a week and away forever. But throwing it away is how he gets that off-the-cuff feel, and side two is great fun." Christgau singled out "Brownsville Girl" for praise, hailing it as "one of the greatest and most ridiculous of [Dylan's] great ridiculous epics."

The album's reputation has not improved with time. Writing in 1991 for Entertainment Weekly magazine, Bill Flanagan characterized Knocked Out Loaded as "haphazard", despite enjoying Dylan's collaborations with Tom Petty and the Heartbreakers and Sam Shepard. The 2004 edition of The Rolling Stone Album Guide dismissed the album as "the absolute bottom of the Dylan barrel". In 2012, The A.V. Club grouped Knocked Out Loaded with Empire Burlesque and Down in the Groove to form "a trilogy of weak-to-awful albums that found Dylan struggling to find inspiration and chasing trendy production techniques that played against his strengths." In 2024, Matt Mitchell of Paste magazine ranked Knocked Out Loaded the fourth worst of Dylan's studio albums, with only the song "Brownsville Girl" saving it from being "the undoubted, undisputed pick for 'worst album made by a great musician'."

Michael Gray offered a mixed assessment in his book Song and Dance Man: The Art Of Bob Dylan:

"[A]fter the overblown robotic coldness of Empire Burlesque, this third-rate assemblage of studio scrapings ... has a warmth and human frailty that at least lets you in. Tired r&b ('You Wanna Ramble') and rockism ('Got My Mind Made Up'); immaculately sung but shifty pop ('Under Your Spell'); a cover of Kris Kristofferson's wretched 'They Killed Him'; and Dylan's fine 'Maybe Someday' so badly produced that it is incomprehensible and could be sung by one of the Chipmunks. There's a tender rendition, well-produced and refreshingly arranged, of the gospel standard 'Precious Memories', a robust cut of a good minor Dylan song 'Drifting [sic] Too Far From Shore' (with mad drumming), and, hidden among the dross, 'Brownsville Girl', co-written with Sam Shepard: a wonderful and innovative major work, intelligent and subtle, from a Bob Dylan out from behind his 1980s wall of self-contempt and wholly in command of his incomparable vocal resources."

Dylan has played few songs from Knocked Out Loaded in concert; "Driftin' Too Far from Shore", with 14 performances (all but one in 1988), is the most frequently performed. Four songs remain unplayed, while the other three have together been aired only five times.

The album was remastered and re-issued in 2013 as a part of The Complete Albums Collection, Vol. One box set.

== Commercial performance ==
Knocked Out Loaded debuted on the US Billboard 200 at No. 80 and peaked three weeks later at No. 53, becoming Dylan's lowest charting studio album since his debut in 1962. Sales were similarly weak on the UK Albums Chart, where it debuted at No. 35 before falling off the charts five weeks later. Knocked Out Loaded's highest chart position was in Norway, where peaked at No. 9.

== Track listing ==
Side one
No.	Title	Writer(s)	Length
1.	"You Wanna Ramble"	Little Junior Parker	3:14
2.	"They Killed Him"	Kris Kristofferson	4:00
3.	"Driftin' Too Far from Shore"	Bob Dylan	3:39
4.	"Precious Memories"	Traditional; arranged by Dylan	3:13
5.	"Maybe Someday"	Dylan	3:17
Total length:			17:23

Side two
No.	Title	Writer(s)	Length
1.	"Brownsville Girl"	Dylan, Sam Shepard	11:00
2.	"Got My Mind Made Up"	Dylan, Tom Petty	2:53
3.	"Under Your Spell"	Dylan, Carole Bayer Sager	3:58
Total length:			17:51

== Personnel ==
- Bob Dylan – guitar, keyboards, vocals, production
- Peggi Blu – background vocals
- Majason Bracey – background vocals
- Clem Burke, Anton Fig, Mike Berment, Milton Gabriel, Don Heffington, Bryan Parris, Stan Lynch, Raymond Lee Pounds – drums
- T Bone Burnett, Tom Petty, Ira Ingber, Mike Campbell, Jack Sherman, David A. Stewart, Ronnie Wood – guitar
- Carolyn Dennis – background vocals
- Steve Douglas – saxophone
- Howie Epstein, James Jamerson, Jr., John McKenzie, Vito Sanfilippo, Carl Sealove (Brownsville Girl), Jon Paris – bass guitar
- Lara Firestone – background vocals
- Keysha Gwin – background vocals
- Muffy Hendrix – background vocals
- April Hendrix-Haberlan – background vocals
- Dewey B. Jones II – background vocals
- Phil Jones – congas
- Al Kooper, Vince Melamed, Patrick Seymour, Benmont Tench – keyboards
- Steve Madaio – trumpet
- Queen Esther Marrow – background vocals
- Larry Mayhand – background vocals
- Larry Meyers – mandolin
- Angel Newell – background vocals
- Herbert Newell – background vocals
- Al Perkins – steel guitar
- Crystal Pounds – background vocals
- Madelyn Quebec – background vocals
- Pamela Quinlan – background vocals
- Daina Smith – background vocals
- Maia Smith – vocals
- Medena Smith – background vocals
- Annette May Thomas – background vocals
- Damien Turnbough – background vocals
- Chyna Wright – background vocals
- Elesecia Wright – background vocals
- Tiffany Wright – background vocals

=== Production ===
- Britt Bacon – engineering
- Judy Feltus – engineering
- Don Smith – engineering
- George Tutko – engineering

== Charts ==
Chart performance for Knocked Out Loaded
Chart (1986)	Peak position
Austrian Albums (Ö3 Austria)	24
German Albums (Offizielle Top 100)	50
Dutch Albums (Album Top 100)	37
New Zealand Albums (RMNZ)	23
Norwegian Albums (VG-lista)	9
Swedish Albums (Sverigetopplistan)	20
Swiss Albums (Schweizer Hitparade)	18
UK Albums (Official Charts)	35
US Billboard 200	53
