= Tongues (play) =

- Original language: English
- Written by: Sam Shepard
- Genre: Drama

Premiere
- Date: 1978

Tongues is a 1978 play by Sam Shepard and Joseph Chaikin. Tongues is a series of monologues set to percussion and meant for one actor. Shepard and Chaikin had previously agreed to do a piece surrounding the concept of the voice, and nearing completion of the piece, decided it required some kind of musical accompaniment. It was first performed at the Magic Theatre in San Francisco, by the playwrights themselves: Chaikin provided the voice of the speaker, and Shepard was the director and instrumentalist. The play is written so that actors who wish to perform the piece can experiment with the stage directions, which are minimal aside from the percussion directions.

== Plot summary ==
The play is set on a bare stage, with a single chair draped in a Mexican blanket for the speaker. The stage is essentially black, except for the blanket. The sole character is the speaker, who begins telling the story of a nameless man. The speaker then goes on to impersonate different people such as a mother, a worker, and a "voice to a Blind One". A highlight of the play is described as the "Hunger Dialogue" in the script, which involves a contradictory exchange between two characters (both played by the speaker). The voice for each character are made distinct from each other only by the tone the speaker uses for each.
