= La Turista =

- Written by: Sam Shepard
- Characters: Salem; Kent; Boy; Doctor; Son; Doc; Sonny
- Original language: English
- Genre: Drama
- Setting: Hotel rooms in Mexico and in the US

Premiere
- Date premiered: 4 March 1967
- Place premiered: American Place Theatre, New York City.

La Turista is a play by the American playwright Sam Shepard, first performed at American Place Theatre, New York City in 1967, directed by Jacques Levy. The title refers to the most common illness among tourists. The two main characters are Salem and Kent, which are also the names of brands of cigarettes. It is a two-act dramatic play. The first act takes place in Mexico, and the second in the United States. Some see this play as a reference to the Vietnam War.

== Production history ==
La Turista was first performed at the American Place Theatre in New York City, on March 4, 1967. The cast was as follows:

- Salem – Joyce Aaron
- Kent – Sam Waterston
- Boy/Sonny – Lawrence Block
- Doctor/Doc – Michael Lombard
- Son – Joel Novack
- Directed by: Jacques Levy

== Reception ==
Reviewing a 1981 Boston production, critic Alan Stern wrote that "La Turista has no discernible theme...Shepard uses free association and non sequiturs for their own sake. Instead of soaring to the outer reaches of the imagination, his speeches are mired in so much logorrhea."
