= Sam Shepard =

American playwright and actor (1943–2017)

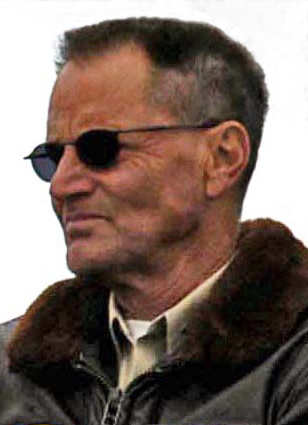
- Shepard in 2004
- Born: Samuel Shepard Rogers III; November 5, 1943; Fort Sheridan, Illinois, U.S.
- Died: July 27, 2017 (aged 73); Midway, Kentucky, U.S.
- Education: Mt. San Antonio College
- Occupations: Playwright; actor; director; screenwriter; author; musician
- Years active: 1963–2017
- Works: Full list
- Spouse: O-Lan Jones (m. 1969; div. 1984)
- Partner: Jessica Lange (1982–2009)
- Children: 3
- Awards: Full list

Signature
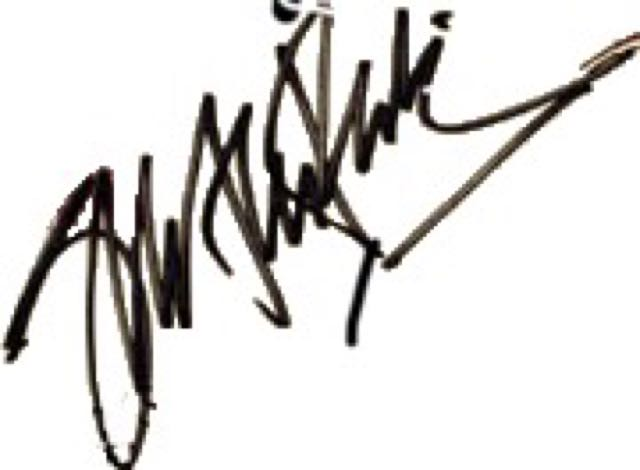

Samuel Shepard Rogers III (November 5, 1943 – July 27, 2017) was an American playwright, actor, director, screenwriter, author, and musician whose career spanned half a century. He wrote 58 plays and several books of short stories, essays, and memoirs. His accolades include the Pulitzer Prize for Drama (for his play Buried Child), the Drama Desk Award, the PEN/Laura Pels Theater Award, and a record 10 Obie Awards, in addition to nominations for two Tony Awards, an Academy Award, a BAFTA Award, a Golden Globe Award, a Laurence Olivier Award, and a Primetime Emmy Award. He was inducted into the American Theater Hall of Fame in 1994. The New York magazine described Shepard as "the greatest American playwright of his generation."

Shepard's plays are known for their bleak, poetic, surrealist elements, black comedy, and rootless characters living on the outskirts of American society. His style evolved from the absurdism of his early Off-off-Broadway work to the realism of later plays like Buried Child and Curse of the Starving Class.

== Life and career ==
=== Early years and education ===
Sam Shepard was born on November 5, 1943, in the Chicago suburb of Fort Sheridan, Illinois. He was called Steve Rogers.

His father was a teacher and farmer who served in the United States Army Air Forces as a bomber pilot during World War II. Shepard characterized his father as "a drinking man, a dedicated alcoholic". His mother, Jane Elaine (née Schook; 1917–1994), was a teacher and a native of Chicago.

Shepard grew up in southern California. He worked on a ranch as a teenager. After graduating in 1961 from Duarte High School in Duarte, California, he briefly studied animal husbandry at nearby Mt. San Antonio College. While in college, Shepard became enamored of Samuel Beckett, jazz, and abstract expressionism. He dropped out to join the Bishop's Company, a touring repertory group.

=== Writing ===
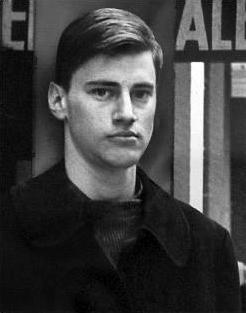
Shepard at age 21

Shepard moved to New York City in 1963 and found work as a busboy at the Village Gate nightclub. The following year, the Village Gate's head waiter, Ralph Cook, founded the experimental stage company Theater Genesis, housed at St. Mark's Church in-the-Bowery in Manhattan. Two of Shepard's earliest one-act plays, The Rock Garden and Cowboys, debuted at Theater Genesis in October 1964. It was around this time that he adopted the professional name Sam Shepard.

In 1965, Shepard's one-act plays Dog and The Rocking Chair were produced at La MaMa Experimental Theatre Club. These were the first of many productions of Shepard's work at La MaMa during the 1960s, 1970s, and 1980s. In 1967, Tom O'Horgan directed Shepard's Melodrama Play alongside Leonard Melfi's Times Square and Rochelle Owens' Futz at La MaMa. In 1969, Jeff Bleckner directed Shepard's play The Unseen Hand at La MaMa. Bleckner then directed The Unseen Hand alongside Forensic and the Navigators at the nearby Astor Place Theatre in 1970.

Shepard's play Shaved Splits was directed at La MaMa in 1970 by Bill Hart. Seth Allen directed Melodrama Play at La MaMa the following year. In 1981, Tony Barsha directed The Unseen Hand at La MaMa. The production then transferred to the Provincetown Playhouse and ran for over 100 performances. Syracuse Stage co-produced The Tooth of Crime at La MaMa in 1983. Also in 1983, the Overtone Theatre and New Writers at the Westside co-produced Shepard's plays Superstitions and The Sad Lament of Pecos Bill on the Eve of Killing His Wife at La MaMa. John Densmore performed in his own play Skins and Shepard and Joseph Chaikin's play Tongues, directed as a double bill by Tony Abatemarco, at La MaMa in 1984. Nicholas Swyrydenko directed a production of Geography of a Horse Dreamer at La MaMa in 1985.

Several of Shepard's early plays, including Red Cross (1966) and La Turista (1967), were directed by Jacques Levy. A patron of the Chelsea Hotel scene, he also contributed to Kenneth Tynan's Oh! Calcutta! (1969) and drummed sporadically from 1967 through 1971 with the band The Holy Modal Rounders, appearing on their albums Indian War Whoop (1967) and The Moray Eels Eat The Holy Modal Rounders (1968). After winning six Obie Awards between 1966 and 1968, Shepard emerged as a screenwriter with Robert Frank's Me and My Brother (1968) and Michelangelo Antonioni's Zabriskie Point (1970).

Cowboy Mouth, a collaboration with his then-lover Patti Smith, was staged at The American Place Theatre in April 1971, providing early exposure for Smith, who would become a well-known musician. The story and characters in Cowboy Mouth were inspired by Shepard and Smith's relationship. After opening night, he abandoned the production and fled to New England without a word to anyone involved.

Shortly thereafter, Shepard moved with his wife and son to London. There he immersed himself in the study of G.I. Gurdjieff's Fourth Way, a recurring preoccupation for much of his life. Returning to the United States in 1975, he moved to the 20-acre Flying Y Ranch in Mill Valley, California, where he raised a young colt named Drum and rode double with his young son on an appaloosa named Cody. Shepard continued to write plays and served for a semester as Regents' Professor of Drama at the University of California, Davis.

Shepard accompanied Bob Dylan on the Rolling Thunder Revue of 1975. He wrote the script for the 1978 film Renaldo and Clara that emerged from the tour, although little of his work was used because much of the film was improvised. Rolling Thunder Logbook, his diary of the tour, was published in 1978. A decade later, Dylan and Shepard co-wrote the 11-minute song "Brownsville Girl", which was released on Dylan's 1986 album Knocked Out Loaded and on later compilations.

In 1975, Shepard was named playwright-in-residence at the Magic Theatre in San Francisco, where he created many of his notable works, including his Family Trilogy. One of the plays in the trilogy, Buried Child (1978), won the Pulitzer Prize, and was nominated for five Tony Awards. This marked a turning point in his career, heralding some of his best-known work, including True West (1980), Fool for Love (1983), and A Lie of the Mind (1985). Buried Child was a comic tale of reunion in which a young man drops in on his grandfather's Illinois farmstead only to be greeted with indifference by his relations; it saw Shepard stake a claim to the psychological terrain of classic American theater. True West and Fool for Love were nominated for the Pulitzer Prize. Some critics have expanded the trilogy to a quintet, including Fool for Love and A Lie of the Mind. Between 1966 and 1984, Shepard won a record ten Obie Awards for writing and directing.

In 2010, A Lie of the Mind was revived in New York at the same time as Shepard's new play Ages of the Moon opened there. Reflecting on the two plays, Shepard said that the older play felt "awkward", adding, "All of the characters are in a fractured place, broken into pieces, and the pieces don't really fit together," while the newer play "is like a Porsche. It's sleek, it does exactly what you want it to do, and it can speed up but also shows off great brakes." The revival and the new play also coincided with the publication of Shepard's collection Day out of Days: Stories. The book includes "short stories, poems and narrative sketches... that developed from dozens of leather-bound notebooks [Shepard] carried with him over the years."

=== Acting ===
Shepard began his acting career when cast as the land baron in Terrence Malick's Days of Heaven (1978) opposite Richard Gere and Brooke Adams. This led to other film roles, including that of Cal, Ellen Burstyn's character's love interest in Resurrection (1980), and, most notably, Shepard's portrayal of Chuck Yeager in The Right Stuff (1983). The latter performance earned Shepard an Academy Award nomination for Best Supporting Actor. By 1986, Fool for Love was adapted by Robert Altman with Shepard in the lead role; A Lie of the Mind was being performed Off Broadway (with Harvey Keitel and Geraldine Page); and Shepard was working steadily as a film actor. Together, these achievements put him on the cover of Newsweek. In 1987, Shepard starred with Diane Keaton in Baby Boom.

Over the years, Shepard taught extensively on playwriting and other aspects of theater. He gave classes and seminars at various theater workshops, festivals, and universities. Shepard was elected to the American Academy of Arts and Letters in 1986, and was elected a Fellow of the American Academy of Arts and Sciences in 1986. In 2000, Shepard demonstrated his gratitude to the Magic Theatre by staging The Late Henry Moss as a benefit for the theater, in San Francisco. The cast included Nick Nolte, Sean Penn, Woody Harrelson, and Cheech Marin. The limited, three-month run was sold out. In 2001, Shepard played General William F. Garrison in the film Black Hawk Down. Although he was cast in a supporting role, Shepard enjoyed renewed interest in his talent for screen acting.

Shepard performed Spalding Gray's final monologue Life Interrupted for the audiobook version, released in 2006. In 2007, Shepard contributed banjo to Patti Smith's cover of Nirvana's song "Smells Like Teen Spirit" on her album Twelve. Although many artists had an influence on Shepard's work, one of the more significant was Joseph Chaikin, a veteran of The Living Theatre and founder of The Open Theater. The two worked together on various projects, and Shepard has stated that Chaikin was a valuable mentor.

In 2011, Shepard starred in the film Blackthorn. His final film appearance is Never Here, which premiered in June 2017 but had been filmed in 2014. Shepard also appeared in the television series Bloodline from 2014 to 2017.

=== Directing ===
At the beginning of his career, Shepard did not direct his own plays. His early plays had a number of different directors, but were most frequently directed by Ralph Cook, the founder of Theatre Genesis. Later, while living at the Flying Y Ranch, Shepard formed a successful playwright-director relationship with Robert Woodruff, who directed the premiere of Buried Child (1982). During the 1970s, Shepard decided that his vision for his plays required him to direct them himself. He directed many of his own plays from that point onward. With only a few exceptions, he did not direct plays by other playwrights. He also directed two films (Far North and Silent Tongue) but reportedly did not see film directing as a major interest.

== Personal life ==
When Shepard first arrived in New York City, he roomed with Charlie Mingus III, a friend from Duarte High School and the son of jazz musician Charles Mingus. Shepard then lived with actress Joyce Aaron.

Between 1967 and 1970 he was part of the New York psychedelic rock group The Holy Modal Rounders as drummer, participating in the recording of two albums, Indian War Whoop released in 1967 and The Moray Eels Eat The Holy Modal Rounders in 1968.

From 1969 to 1984, he was married to actress O-Lan Jones, with whom he had one son.

From 1970 to 1971, Shepard was involved in an extramarital affair with musician Patti Smith, who remained unaware of his identity as a multiple Obie Award-winning playwright until it was divulged to her by Jackie Curtis. Smith said: "Me and his wife still even liked each other. I mean, it wasn't like committing adultery in the suburbs or something."

Canadian singer-songwriter Joni Mitchell wrote two songs about her affairs with Shepard during Bob Dylan's Rolling Thunder Revue tour of 1975. In "Coyote", from her eighth studio album Hejira, she recounts Shepard's seduction of her at a period while he was both married and having an extramarital affair with tour manager Christine O'Dell with the lines: "He's got a woman at home, another woman down the hall, but he seems to want me anyway." Meanwhile, in "Don Juan's Reckless Daughter", written during the same tour, Mitchell referred to the closeness between their birthdays, calling them "twins of spirit".

Shepard met actress Jessica Lange on the set of the 1982 film Frances, in which they were both acting. He moved in with her in 1983, and they were together for 27 years; they separated in 2009. They had two children. In 2003, Shepard's elder son, Jesse, wrote a book of short stories, and Shepard appeared with him at a reading at City Lights Bookstore.

In 2014 and 2015, Shepard dated actress Mia Kirshner.

After a turbulent trip on an airliner returning from Mexico in the 1960s, he apparently vowed never to fly again. Despite this longstanding aversion to flying, Shepard allowed Chuck Yeager to take him up in a jet in 1982 in preparation for playing the pilot in the film The Right Stuff. Shepard cited his fear of flying as a source for a character in his 1966 play Icarus's Mother. His character went through an airliner crash in the film Voyager.

In the early morning hours of January 3, 2009, Shepard was arrested and charged with speeding and drunk driving in Normal, Illinois. He pleaded guilty to both charges on February 11, 2009, and was sentenced to 24 months' probation, alcohol education classes, and 100 hours of community service. On May 25, 2015, Shepard was arrested again in Santa Fe, New Mexico, for aggravated drunk driving. Those charges were later dismissed as having no likelihood of conviction at trial.

His 50-year friendship with Johnny Dark, stepfather to O-Lan Jones, was the subject of the 2013 documentary Shepard & Dark by Treva Wurmfeld. A collection of Shepard and Dark's correspondence, Two Prospectors, was also published that year.

== Death ==
Shepard died on July 27, 2017, at his home in Midway, Kentucky, aged 73, from complications of amyotrophic lateral sclerosis (ALS). Patti Smith paid homage to their long collaboration in The New Yorker. Fellow actor Matthew McConaughey, who had co-starred with Shepard in Mud, learned of Shepard's death during a television interview and was shocked by the news, ending the interview saying: "We lost one of the great ones. Great writer, great mind. See you in the next one, Sam."

=== Archives ===
Sam Shepard's papers are split between the Wittliff Collections of Southwestern Writers at Texas State University, comprising 27 boxes (13 linear feet) and the Harry Ransom Center at the University of Texas at Austin, comprising 30 document boxes (12.6 linear feet).

== Works ==
=== Plays ===
- 1964: Cowboys
- 1964: The Rock Garden
- 1964: Up to Thursday
- 1965: Chicago
- 1965: Icarus's Mother
- 1965: 4-H Club
- 1966: Red Cross
- 1966: Fourteen Hundred Thousand
- 1967: La Turista
- 1967: Cowboys #2
- 1967: Forensic & the Navigators
- 1969: The Unseen Hand
- 1969: Oh! Calcutta! (contributed sketches)
- 1970: The Holy Ghostly
- 1970: Operation Sidewinder
- 1970: Shaved Splits
- 1971: Mad Dog Blues
- 1971: Back Bog Beast Bait
- 1971: Cowboy Mouth (with Patti Smith)
- 1972: The Tooth of Crime
- 1974: Geography of a Horse Dreamer
- 1974: Little Ocean
- 1975: Killer's Head
- 1975: Action
- 1976: Angel City
- 1976: Suicide in B Flat
- 1977: Inacoma
- 1978: Curse of the Starving Class
- 1978: Buried Child
- 1978: Tongues (with Joseph Chaikin)
- 1979: Seduced: a Play in Two Acts
- 1980: True West
- 1981: Savage/Love (with Joseph Chaikin)
- 1983: Fool for Love
- 1984: Country
- 1985: A Lie of the Mind
- 1987: A Short Life of Trouble
- 1987: The War in Heaven (Angel's Monologue) (with Joseph Chaikin and Rick Harris)
- 1991: States of Shock
- 1993: Simpatico
- 1996: When the World Was Green (A Chef's Fable) (with Joseph Chaikin)
- 1996: Tooth of Crime (Second Dance)
- 1998: Eyes for Consuela
- 2000: The Late Henry Moss
- 2004: The God of Hell
- 2007: Kicking a Dead Horse
- 2009: Ages of the Moon
- 2012: Heartless
- 2014: A Particle of Dread (Oedipus Variations)

=== Collections ===
- 1973: Hawk Moon, Black Sparrow Press; ISBN 0-933826-23-0
- 1983: Motel Chronicles, City Lights; ISBN 0-87286-143-0
- 1984: Seven Plays, Dial Press, 368 pages; ISBN 0-553-34611-3. Selected by critic Harold Bloom for inclusion in his list of works constituting the Western Canon.
- 1984: Fool for Love and Other Plays, Bantam Books, 320 pages; ISBN 0-553-34590-7
- 1996: The Unseen Hand: and Other Plays, Vintage Books, 400 pages; ISBN 0-679-76789-4
- 1996: Cruising Paradise, Vintage Books, 255 pages; ISBN 0-679-74217-4
- 2003: Great Dream of Heaven, Vintage Books, 160 pages; ISBN 0-375-70452-3
- 2004: Rolling Thunder Logbook, Da Capo Press, 176 pages (reissue); ISBN 0-306-81371-8
- 2004: Day Out of Days: Stories, Knopf, 304 pages; ISBN 978-0-307-26540-1
- 2013: Two Prospectors: The Letters of Sam Shepard and Johnny Dark, University of Texas Press, 400 pages; ISBN 978-0-292-76196-4

=== Novels ===
- 2017: The One Inside, Knopf, 172 pages; ISBN 978-0-451-49458-0
- 2017: Spy of the First Person, Knopf, 96 pages (published posthumously); ISBN 978-0-525-52156-3

== See also ==
- List of members of the American Academy of Arts and Letters Department of Literature
- List of playwrights from the United States
- List of actors with Academy Award nominations
