= Alien Autopsy =

Alien Autopsy may refer to:

- Alien Autopsy (1995 film), a pseudo-documentary using hoaxed black-and-white footage
- Alien Autopsy (2006 film), a British comedy based on the events surrounding the 1995 hoax
