= Ray Santilli =

British musician, record and film producer

- Raymond Santilli
- Born: 30 September 1958 (age 68); Marylebone, London, England
- Occupations: Television producer, Musician, Film producer, and Record producer
- Years active: 1982 – Present
- Known for: Founder of Orbital Media
- Website: www.orbitalmedia.net

Ray Santilli (born 30 September 1958) is a British musician, record and film producer. He is best known for his exploitation in 1995 of the controversial "alien autopsy" footage and subject of the Warner Bros. film Alien Autopsy.

== Early life ==
Born in London, Santilli was the son of Italian immigrants. He spent his childhood in Islington London.

== Career ==
Ray Santilli started his professional career in 1974 as a session musician, record producer and music distributor. In 1982, Santilli founded AMP Entertainment, where he produced and promoted acts of the day.

In 1981, Santilli produced The Tweets album which featured "The Birdy Song". In 1985 he founded Music Broadcasting Services Ltd, an independent record label which handled the exclusive rights to the Walt Disney Audio Soundtrack Catalogue in the United Kingdom.

In 1987 Santilli produced the charity record "The Wishing Well" featuring Boy George, Dollar and Grace Kennedy for Great Ormond Street Hospital. In 1991, Santilli founded the Merlin Group. The company specialised in the re-recording of hits with original artists. Merlin also produced and marketed a number of television specials. In 1994 Santilli formed Orbital Media Ltd where he produced a succession of TV documentaries and films for television.

Santilli is best known for his claim to have discovered footage which depicted the autopsy of an alien creature. The "alien autopsy" footage, supposedly of extraterrestrial corpses from the so-called Roswell UFO incident, was broadcast to a worldwide audience on 28 August 1995. The film and those who took part in the making of it have all admitted it is a hoax, although Santilli still maintains it is real despite him changing his story numerous times. He also claims Kodak have analysed the film and confirmed its date, but when asked to resubmit the film with the images, Santilli has always refused.

In 2006 the story of the autopsy film was the subject of a Warner Bros. feature film Alien Autopsy, starring the British double act Ant & Dec. Dec plays Santilli, with Ant as Santilli's real life business partner and friend Gary Shoefield. In the same year, Santilli claimed that sections of the autopsy footage had been "restored".

In 2026 a television series named The Alien Autopsy Scandal was released by Sky Documentaries which features interviews with other collaborators, including sculptor John Humphreys who was employed by Santilli to create the alien creature.

== Filmography ==
Year	Title	Role	Notes
1994	The Beatles, The Long and Winding Road: The Life and Times	Co-producer	TV movie documentary
1994	The Life of Bruce Lee	Executive producer	TV movie documentary
1994	Batmad	Producer, writer	TV movie
1995	Alan Shearer: Sheer Magic	Producer	Video documentary
1995	Alien Autopsy: (Fact or Fiction?)	Producer-uncredited, Actor	TV movie documentary
1995	The Doctors, 30 Years of Time Travel and Beyond	Executive producer	Video documentary
1999	Bruce Lee: The Legend Lives On	Producer, writer, Director	TV movie
2001	Elvis: The Missing Years	Producer, director	Video documentary
2001	The Beatles... Off the Record: Newsreel Footage 1964-1966	Producer, writer, Director	TV movie documentary)
2002	John Lennon: The Messenger	Producer, writer, Director	TV movie documentary)
2002	Beckham Mania: The Kick Off	Producer	TV movie documentary)
2002	George Harrison: The Quiet One	Producer, writer, Director	Video documentary)
2002	Irish Tenor Trio: A Classic Irish Christmas	Producer, writer	TV movie
2003	Alien Signs: Undeniable Evidence - The Message	Executive producer	TV movie documentary
2003	Elvis: The Journey	Co-producer, Writer, Director	TV movie
2004	Bob Marley: Spiritual Journey	Co-executive producer, Writer, Director, Editor	TV movie
2004	Benny Goodman: Legends in Concert - The Last Performance	Producer, director	TV movie
2004	Jimi Hendrix: The Last 24 Hours	Executive producer, Writer	TV movie documentary
2005	Elvis: The Last 24 Hours	Producer	TV movie
2005	Nat King Cole: For Sentimental Reasons	Co-producer, Writer, Director	TV movie
2005	Viva Joe Strummer: The Clash and Beyond	Producer, writer	Video documentary
2005	Marc Bolan: Ride On	Producer	Video documentary
2005	Tom Jones: Up Close and Personal	Co-producer, Writer, Director	TV movie
2005	Johnny Cash: The Man in Black - His Early Years	Executive producer	Video documentary
2005	Frank Sinatra: A Reflection	Producer, writer	TV movie documentary
2006	Clash: The Joe Strummer Story	Producer	TV movie
2006	Dean Martin: A Reflection	Producer, writer	TV movie documentary
2006	Alien Autopsy	Executive producer, Cameo as himself	Film
2006	Thin Lizzy: Outlawed - The Real Phil Lynott	Executive producer	TV movie documentary
2006	Elvis Presley and Johnny Cash: The Road Show	Executive producer	Video documentary
2007	Bob Marley Freedom Road	Executive producer	Documentary
2008	Blue Rendezvous	Producer, writer, Director	TV movie
2012	One Direction: All for One	Executive producer	Documentary
2013	Hendrix on Hendrix	Executive producer	Documentary
