= Desire (Grace Kennedy album) =

Studio album by Grace Kennedy
- Released: 1979
- Genre: funk / soul
- Length: 39:42
- Label: DJM Records

Grace Kennedy chronology
Grace Kennedy (1979)	Desire (1979)	I'm Starting Again (1981)

Desire is the second album of the British singer Grace Kennedy, released in 1979. Its development and background was based on her musical success of the previous years, after winning the TV talent show Opportunity Knocks in 1977 and then also featuring in a 1979 episode of Star Treatment.

The album was digitalized in 2021.

== Credits ==
- Arranged and conducted by John Coleman (tracks: A2, A5, B3), Mike McNaught (tracks: A3, B5), Tony Sadler (tracks: A1, A4, B1, B2, B4)
- Backing Vocals – Alan Harding, Gaynor Sadler, Joanne Stone, Lynn Cornell, Shady Calver, Stephanie De Sykes, Tony Sadler, Val Stokes, Vicki Brown
- Bass – Andy Pask, Dave Olney, Dill Katz, Paul Westward
- Brass – Cliff Hardie (tracks: A1, B1), Derek Watkins (tracks: A1, B1), Stan Sultzmann (tracks: A1, B1)
- Drums – Clem Cattini, Frank Gibson, Graham Jarvis
- Guitar – Alan Sparks, Colin Green, Ray Russell, Ricky Hitchcock, Tony Sadler
- Keyboards – John Coleman, Mike McNaught, Vince Povey
- Percussion – Luís Jardim, Tony Carr
- Producer – Phillip Swern

== Track listing ==
No.	Title	Length
1.	"By Way Of Love's Express"	3:40
2.	"Fandango Dancin"	3:15
3.	"Cupid's Defence"	4:26
4.	"Woman Is Free"	4:00
5.	"My Heart Keeps Breaking Over You"	4:12
6.	"Desire"	3:50
7.	"Reachin' Out For Your Love"	4:35
8.	"Don't You Ever Get Lonely"	3:25
9.	"We Did It"	4:45
10.	"With One More Look At You"	3:50
Total length:		39:42
