= One Voice (Grace Kennedy album) =

Studio album by Grace Kennedy
- Released: 1981
- Genre: funk / soul, blues
- Length: 50:04
- Label: BBC Records

Grace Kennedy chronology
I'm Starting Again (1981)	One Voice (1981)

One Voice is the fourth album of the British singer Grace Kennedy. It was released in 1981, under the label BBC Records. Music from this album featured in the Saturday night prime time entertainment show, The Grace Kennedy Show, which ran for six series between 1981–1983 and won a BAFTA award.

The tracks were orchestrated by John Coleman and produced by Philip Swern. The album was digitalized in 2021.

== Track listing ==
No.	Title	Length
1.	"One Voice"	1:06
2.	"The Letter"	2:26
3.	"As Time Goes By"	3:26
4.	"My Old Piano"	2:31
5.	"Feeling Too Good Today Blues"	3:05
6.	"I Know I'll Never Love This Way Agan"	3:04
7.	"(Your Love Takes Me) Higher & Higher"	3:15
8.	"I Love You"	3:02
9.	"Don't Cry Out Loud"	3:06
10.	"Looking Up"	2:23
11.	"Missing You"	3:21
12.	"We Don't Make Each Other Laugh Any More"	3:31
13.	"Motown Medley: (a) Stop In The Name Of Love (b) My Cherie Amour (c) Touch Me In The Morning (d) Do You Know Where You're Going To (e) Ain't No Mountain High Enough (f) Reach Out I'll Be There"	6:32
14.	"Let Your Mama Know"	3:42
15.	"Bandstand Boogie"	2:17
16.	"Dance Away"	3:08
Total length:		50:04
