= I'm Starting Again =

Studio album by Grace Kennedy
- Released: 1981
- Genres: funk / soul, pop
- Length: 48:02
- Label: DJM Records

Grace Kennedy chronology
Desire (1979)	I'm Starting Again (1981)	One Voice (1981)

I'm Starting Again is the third album by the British singer Grace Kennedy, released by DJM Records in 1981. The album was produced by Philip Swern. It was distributed in the United States by Profile Records and was the first album release of the label. The title track was the first single from the album reaching the top 30 in the U.S. chart. The album was digitalized in 2021.

I'm Starting Again was featured on Kennedy's TV series which opened on BBC2 on January 26.

== Songs ==
"I'm Starting Again" is a dance track with a strong guitar edge, opening the album. It was released in 7in and 12in form.

Tony Blackburn wrote "It's Not Me Anymore", a slow, sorrowful ballad after the break-up of his marriage with Tessa Wyatt. He sent it anonymously to Kennedy. He used the pseudonym A. Simon.

Her interpretation of "Love Is A Serious Business" turned into a Northern soul alternative female version of the Alfie Davidson classic, with a separate rare Canadian Rio Records release in the same year, as it was typical of many Northern soul records.

== Credits ==
- Arranged and conducted by John Coleman and Richard Hewson
- Bass – Dave Olney, Luís Jardim, Paul Westwood
- Drums – Dave Mattacks, Graham Jarvis
- Guitar – Ray Russell
- Keyboards – Graham Todd, John Coleman, Pete Wingfield, Richard Hewson
- Percussion – Luís Jardim
- Producer – Phillip Swern

== Track listing ==
All tracks are produced by Philip Swern.

I'm Starting Again track listing
No.	Title	Writer(s)	Length
1.	"I'm Starting Again"	Thor Baldursson; Russell Stone	4:08
2.	"Heart On The Line"	Roxanne Seeman; Alan Phillips	3:21
3.	"What Did I See In You"	V. Silva	3:42
4.	"It's Not Me Anymore"	Anne Michele; Terry Day; A. Simon	4:10
5.	"Love Is A Serious Business"	Alfie Davidson; Libby Bush; Ted Lehrman	2:49
6.	"Nothing's Changed"	Steve Gray; Stone	4:26
7.	"Love In The Sunshine"	Swern; Richard Hewson	3:54
8.	"If I'm Wrong About You, I'm Wrong About Everything"	Tony Macaulay	3:24
9.	"Until You"	David Castle	3:41
10.	"Love Me To Sleep"	Geoff Stephens	4:13
Total length:			37:48
