= Family Trilogy (disambiguation) =

Family Trilogy is a trio of plays by Sam Shepard which critics consider thematic. It may also refer to:

- Snopes trilogy, a trilogy of novels about the Snopes family by William Faulkner
- Laugh It Up, Fuzzball: The Family Guy Trilogy, a trio of episodes from the television series
- Cole family trilogy, a trilogy of novels by Noah Gordon (novelist)
- Alcolar family trilogy, a trilogy of novels by Kate Walker (writer)
- First Family trilogy, a trilogy of historical works by Doug Wead
