= True West (play) =

1980 play by Sam Shepard

- Poster for 2018 Broadway Revival
- Original language: English
- Written by: Sam Shepard
- Characters: Austin; Lee; Mom; Saul Kimmer
- Genre: Drama, Naturalistic comedy

Premiere
- Date: July 10, 1980
- Place: Magic Theatre, San Francisco, California

True West is a play by the American playwright Sam Shepard, which follows the sibling rivalry between estranged brothers Austin and Lee, who have reconnected. It is set in California, about 20 miles outside of Los Angeles in the foothills of the San Gabriel Valley, at their mother's home. It is known for its exploration of themes such as family dynamics, identity, and the American Dream. The play revolves around the volatile relationship between two brothers, Lee and Austin, as they navigate their contrasting lifestyles and aspirations while staying in their mother's house.

Shephard's writing in True West is characterized by its raw, gritty realism, as well as its dark humor and psychological depth. The play also deals with the portrayal of sibling rivalry and the complexities of masculinity and is considered a staple of contemporary theater. The play was first produced on Off-Broadway at The Public Theater with Tommy Lee Jones and Peter Boyle. It ran at the Steppenwolf Theatre and later transferred off-Broadway at the Cherry Lane Theatre in 1982 with John Malkovich and Gary Sinise. The production was aired on American Playhouse on PBS the following year where it gained a national audience. The play was a finalist for the Pulitzer Prize for Drama in 1983.

The play had its Broadway debut in 2000 at the Circle in the Square Theatre with Philip Seymour Hoffman and John C. Reilly, receiving a Tony Award for Best Play nomination. It was revived on the West End multiple times and on Broadway in 2018. Some critics consider it the third of the Family Trilogy that includes Curse of the Starving Class (1976) and Buried Child (1979). Others consider it part of a quintet that includes Fool for Love (1983) and A Lie of the Mind (1985).

== Characters and cast ==
Character	Off-Broadway debut (1980)	West End debut (1981)	Steppenwolf Theatre (1982)	West End revival (1994)	Broadway debut (2000)	2nd West End revival (2018)	Broadway revival (2018)
Lee	Peter Boyle	Bob Hoskins	John Malkovich	Mark Rylance	Philip Seymour Hoffman	Johnny Flynn	Ethan Hawke
Austin	Tommy Lee Jones	Antony Sher	Gary Sinise	Michael Rudko	John C. Reilly	Kit Harington	Paul Dano
Mom	Laurie Metcalf ^{1}	Anne Dyson	Margaret Thomson	Lynsey Baxter	Celia Weston	Madeleine Potter	Marylouise Burke
Saul	Paul McBurney	Tim Wylton	Sam Schact	Michael Rouse	Robert LuPone	Donald Sage Mackay	Gary Wilmes

- Austin, a Hollywood screenwriter who is well educated and has a wife and children
- Lee, a drifter and a thief, and Austin's older brother.
- Mom, Austin and Lee's mother
- Saul Kimmer, a Hollywood producer

Metcalf also portrayed Mom in the Steppenwolf Theatre production, replacing Thomson in some performances.

== Plot ==
=== Act One ===
True West is about the sibling rivalry between two estranged brothers who have reconnected. The play begins with brothers Austin and Lee sitting in their mother's house. This is the first time they have seen each other in five years. They are not on good terms, but Austin attempts to appease his older brother, who is more dominant. We learn that their mother is on vacation in Alaska and that Austin is housesitting. Austin is trying to work on his screenplay but Lee continually distracts him with nonsense questions. The two brothers seem on edge with each other. When Austin suggests that Lee leave, Lee threatens to steal things from the neighborhood. Austin calms him down and the night ends with them on neutral terms.

Lee talks about the security level of their mother's house, and how Lee went into the desert to find their father. Austin then tells Lee to leave the house because a film producer, Saul, is coming to look at Austin's screenplay (described as a "period piece"). Lee agrees to leave in exchange for Austin's car keys. Austin is reluctant at first but relents, and Lee promises that he return it back by six. Lee departs.

Saul and Austin are discussing their agreement when Lee enters with a stolen television set. Saul and Lee discuss golf and make plans to play the next day, excluding Austin because he does not play, despite his desire that Lee have nothing to do with Saul. Lee proposes a script idea to Saul and Saul reacts positively.

Lee describes his story out loud. Austin writes it down, but stops, saying it does not resemble real life. The brothers quarrel and Austin asks Lee for his car keys back. Lee assumes Austin is trying to make him leave, and Lee says he cannot be kicked out. Austin says he would not kick him out because he is his brother. Lee counters that being brothers means nothing because in-family murders are most common. Austin assures him they will not be driven to murder over a movie script. The two admit to being envious of each other's lives, Lee returns the car keys, but later asks for them back. The scene closes with Austin typing Lee's story.

=== Act Two ===
Lee returns from his golf game at noon, with a set of golf clubs that Saul has given him. He tells Austin that the clubs are part of an advance that Saul has promised him for the story idea outline that he "dictated" to Austin. They celebrate until Lee informs Austin that he expects Austin to write the screenplay. Austin questions this, knowing he has his own work, but Lee goes on to inform him that Saul has chosen to drop Austin's screenplay. Austin warns Lee that he needs to be careful with messing about with this line of work and that he has a lot at stake on his own project. The scene ends with Austin threatening to leave and go to the desert as Lee tries to calm him down.

Austin confronts Saul about his decision to buy Lee's screenplay. He argues that Saul only offered to buy the screenplay because he lost a bet on the golf course. Saul wants Austin to write both his and Lee's story, but Austin refuses. Austin thinks that Lee's story is without merit or plausibility. Due to Austin's rejection of the job, Saul decides to drop Austin's story and to find a different writer for Lee's story. The scene ends with Saul making plans for lunch with Lee.

Austin is drunk and annoying Lee, who is now at the typewriter, laboriously trying, hunt-and-peck style, to type out a screenplay. Austin taunts his brother with advice and says that this is the first time he has enjoyed spending time with Lee since he arrived. He insists that Lee is not a real screenwriter, and when Lee informs him that he has an advance coming on his script, Austin claims he could burgle houses just as well as Lee can. Lee bets that he could not even steal a toaster, but they cannot agree on the stakes. Instead, Lee asks in earnest for Austin's help with the technical parts of the writing, offering to pay him money and then disappear like their father did and leave Austin alone. Austin argues about how well their father ended up, and the scene closes as they drink together.

Austin is polishing toasters that he stole while Lee is smashing a typewriter early in the morning. The two continue to do this while they are carrying on a conversation. Austin is proud of what he has done. Lee wants to see a woman, but Austin refuses because he is married. Lee becomes angry while on the telephone with the operator because he cannot find a pen to write down what the operator is saying. In his search for a pen or pencil, Lee strews the contents of all the kitchen drawers on the floor. Austin begs Lee to go to the desert with him because he thinks there is nothing for him where he is. The brothers make a deal that Austin will write the play for Lee if Lee takes him to the desert.

In the final scene, the house is in shambles and Lee and Austin are working vigorously on their script when their mother walks in, suitcases in hand. She stares at her sons, mouth agape, until Lee finally notices her. She is stunned by her sons' appearance and the state of her house, but she remains calm. She announces that she is expecting a visit from Pablo Picasso. Her sons tell her that Picasso has been dead for some years. Austin tells her that he and Lee are going to go into the desert, but Lee says they might have to postpone the trip because he does not think Austin is cut out for the desert lifestyle. Austin responds by attempting to strangle Lee with the telephone cord. Their mother says that she is going to a motel because she does not recognize the house as hers. Lee ceases struggling and lies inert, and Austin finally lets go. He is worried for a second that he has killed his brother. As Austin moves for the door, Lee rises with fire in his eyes. The two brothers face one another, fists raised, as the lights fade.

== Productions ==
=== Notable productions ===
True West was first performed at the Magic Theatre in San Francisco, where Shepard was the resident playwright. It had its world premiere there on July 10, 1980. It was originally directed by Robert Woodruff and starred Peter Coyote as Austin, Jim Haynie as Lee, Tom Dahlgren as Saul Kimmer and Carol McElheney as Mom. The production moved from the Magic Theatre to the Marines Memorial Theatre in San Francisco in 1981. Ebbe Roe Smith replaced Coyote as Austin.

This production premiered off-Broadway at Joseph Papp's The Public Theater, opening on December 23, 1980, and closing on January 11, 1981. The play starred Tommy Lee Jones and Peter Boyle and was directed by Robert Woodruff.

It was produced by the Steppenwolf Theatre Company in 1982, with the then fairly unknown actors Gary Sinise (who also directed the production) and John Malkovich playing the leads. With Shepard's approval, this production transferred to off-Broadway, where it opened at Cherry Lane Theatre in October 1982. It closed on August 4, 1984, after 762 performances, and, later in the run, the leads were taken over by Bruce Lyons, James Belushi, Gary Cole, Tim Matheson, Erik Estrada, Dennis Quaid and Randy Quaid. A television movie of the stage play, with Sinise and Malkovich, appeared on American Playhouse in January 1984.

Philip Seymour Hoffman and John C. Reilly played the leads on Broadway, where they switched parts during the run. The play opened at the Circle in the Square Theatre on February 17, 2000, and closed on July 29, 2000, after 154 performances and 21 previews. The director, Matthew Warchus, requested that the Tony Administration Committee consider Hoffman and Reilly as a single unit for Tony nominations, but the Committee decided that they would be considered separately. Both Hoffman and Reilly each received a nomination. This revival was also nominated for Best Play and Best Director (Matthew Warchus).

Bruce Willis and Chad Smith starred in a filmed version of the play, which was shown on Showtime in August 2002. The play was filmed in front of a live audience and directed by Gary Halvorson with Andrew Alburger and Danielle Kennedy in supporting roles.

The play was revived on Broadway at the American Airlines Theatre by the Roundabout Theatre Company, entering previews on December 27, 2018, and officially opening on January 24, 2019. It was directed by James Macdonald and starred Ethan Hawke as Lee and Paul Dano as Austin.

=== International productions ===
The play was produced in London by the Royal National Theatre at the Cottesloe Theatre, opening on December 3, 1981. Directed by John Schlesinger, the cast starred Bob Hoskins as Lee and Antony Sher as Austin, with Patricia Hayes as Mom and Shane Rimmer as Saul.

The Donmar Warehouse presented the play in 1994, starring Mark Rylance and Michael Rudko, directed by Matthew Warchus. Sheridan Morley wrote, "This is really a two-man play and as Rylance and Rudko prowl around each other, giving two of the best-contrasted and indeed best performances in town, 'True West' seems somehow a much stronger, funnier and more savage play than I recall from its first National outing over here in the early 1980s." The production began at the Quarry Theatre in Leeds. Matt Wolf called the Donmar Warehouse production a "blazing revival", "one of the best-attended of [Sam] Mendes' early years". The male leads swapped roles every 3 or 4 performances.

Wilson Milam directed a production at the Bristol Old Vic in November 2003, with Phil Daniels as Lee and Andrew Tiernan as Austin. The British Theatre Guide reviewer noted, "The design, by Dick Bird, who was responsible for the much-admired Great Expectations at the Old Vic earlier this year, is excellent. White framed windows opening on to a patio area with plants, furniture and skies beyond." The production replaced the smashing of a typewriter with a modern working laptop, and used 20 working toasters. The production caused the Bristol Old Vic to remove the first three rows of seats for fear that the audience would be harmed and to install a Perspex shield for safety reasons. It received much critical acclaim from the British national press and was cited as "Pick of the Week" in The Guardian newspaper (October 27, November 2, 2003).

Soulpepper, Toronto's largest theatre company, presented Patricia Hamilton, Stuart Hughes and Mike Ross in a production directed by Nancy Palk at the Young Centre for the Performing Arts, running in April – May 2013. Pittsburgh Public Theater's production was directed by Pamela Berlin, with Ken Barnett (Austin) and David Mogentale (Lee), running from November 7 to December 8, 2013, at the O'Reilly Theater. The Citizen's Theatre in Glasgow presented True West in October 29 – November 16, 2013, directed by Philip Breen, starring Alex Ferns and Eugene O'Hare. This production ran at the Tricycle Theatre in London in September 2014. Ivy Arts Centre, University of Surrey, performed by Lone Twin on 24 February 2015. The Plank Theatre Company produced the play at the Complex Theatre in Hollywood, California, in October 2017. The actors, Jacob Grodnik and Drake Shannon, alternated the roles of "Austin" and "Lee" for each performance. "Saul" was performed by Mishone Feigin and the "Mom" was played by Melissa Jobe.

The Vaudeville Theatre in London presented the first West End production of the play which ran from 23 November 2018 to 23 February 2019. Directed by Matthew Dunster, the production starred Kit Harington as Austin and Johnny Flynn as Lee. The Roundabout Theater Company produced the play on Broadway with Ethan Hawke and Paul Dano, which ran from December 27, 2018, to March 17, 2019. A production directed by Braden Abraham ran as part of the Seattle Repertory Theatre's 2019–2020 season, between January 17 and February 16, 2020.

== Reception ==
=== Accolades ===
Year	Award	Category	Nominee	Result
1983	Pulitzer Prize	Pulitzer Prize for Drama	Sam Shepard, True West	Finalist
2000	Tony Award	Best Play	Sam Shepard	Nominated
2000	Tony Award	Best Actor in a Play	Philip Seymour Hoffman	Nominated
2000	Tony Award	Best Actor in a Play	John C. Reilly	Nominated
2000	Tony Award	Best Direction of a Play	Matthew Warchus	Nominated
2000	Drama Desk Award	Outstanding Revival of a Play	Sam Shepard	Nominated
2000	Drama Desk Award	Outstanding Actor in a Play	Philip Seymour Hoffman	Nominated
2000	Drama League Award	Distinguished Production of a Revival		Nominated
2000	Outer Critics Circle Award	Outstanding New Broadway Play		Nominated
2000	Outer Critics Circle Award	Special Award	Philip Seymour Hoffman / John C. Reilly	Won
2000	Theatre World Award		Philip Seymour Hoffman	Won
2019	Drama League Award	Distinguished Performance	Ethan Hawke	Nominated

== Texts ==
- Shepard, Sam (1984). Seven Plays. New York City: Bantam Books. ISBN 0-553-34611-3.
