= Fool for Love (play) =

Play written by Sam Shepard

- Written by: Sam Shepard
- Characters: May; Eddie; The Old Man; Martin
- Genre: Drama
- Setting: Mojave Desert motel

Premiere
- Date premiered: 1983

Fool for Love is a play written by American playwright and actor Sam Shepard. The play focuses on May and Eddie, former lovers who have met again in a motel in the desert. The play premiered in 1983 at the Magic Theatre in San Francisco, where Shepard was the playwright-in-residence. The play was a finalist for the 1984 Pulitzer Prize for Drama.

The play is part of a quintet which includes Shepard's Family Trilogy: Curse of the Starving Class (1977), Buried Child (1979), and True West (1980). The quintet concludes with Fool for Love and A Lie of the Mind (1985).

== Plot ==
The "fools" in the play are battling lovers at a run-down Mojave Desert motel. May is staying at the motel when an old flame, Eddie, shows up. Eddie tries to convince May to come back to him and live in a trailer on a farm in Wyoming that Eddie has always wanted to buy and where he has always imagined living with May. May vehemently refuses. She says that she has absolutely no interest in living with Eddie under such circumstances, that she has a job and started a new life and knows that if she goes back to Eddie their relationship will repeat the same destructive cycle it has followed before. Throughout the play the character of the Old Man—apparently the father of both lovers—sits to the side and talks to May and Eddie and offers commentary on each character and about himself. It is revealed that the Old Man had led a double life, abandoning each family for different periods during each child's life. The two became lovers in their high school years and when their parents finally figured out what had occurred, Eddie's mother shot herself. May is afraid that Eddie has begun to emulate his father; taking to drinking and secretly seeing a woman May refers to as the Countess. The play centers around the drama of the confrontation rather than a plot with any rising and falling action. In the end Eddie appears to have left May, just as his father had left his mother, and May has packed her suitcase to go off somewhere unspecified. Eddie and May have not reconciled, the Old Man has begun to drift off in denial that Eddie's mother had been driven to suicide, and May's erstwhile date, Martin, is left on stage bewildered to observe it all.

== Themes and analysis ==
Sean Murray, the artistic director of Cygnet Theatre, San Diego, spoke of True West and Fool for Love, which he presented in repertory in 2014: “There’s a definite crisis of identity going on in both these plays... And it’s as if both sets of [main characters] are doomed to be together... Both plays are about family and genealogy and being connected to your genetic brood,... And they also share the 'iconic Sam Shepard father character—that disconnected, alcoholic father who can’t communicate, who’s trying so hard to make it work.'"

Nelson Pressley, reviewing a regional production in The Washington Post, referred to the play as having a "vintage Sam Shepard desperation-at-the-edge-of-the-desert look" with a "twisted cowboy romance."

In reviewing the Williamstown Theatre Festival production from 2014, the reviewers noted that the play is "a masterpiece of understatement and allusion. But as with Sam Shepard plays, the words escalate into explosive action, the actors tearing at each other like mortal enemies." In another analysis of the Williamstown production, Elyse Sommer notes: "Like all of Shepard's best plays, despite the evocative Mojave Desert outside the motel room in which it plays out, the landscape here is of the emotions that contain states of mind inside the self... Eddie and May have no tragic flaw or fateful quest but are just caught up in sorting through the emotional tumult of their lives in a power struggle where identity is vague and the past haunts the present."

== Production history ==
The original production, directed by Shepard, opened at the Magic Theatre in San Francisco on February 8, 1983 and starred Ed Harris and Kathy Baker. Shepard was the playwright-in-residence at the Magic Theatre.

It had its Off-Broadway premiere at the Circle Repertory Theatre on May 26, 1983, with the same cast before later transferring to the Douglas Fairbanks Theatre, and closed on September 29, 1985. The production later featured Will Patton, Bruce Willis, Aidan Quinn, and Frances Fisher. Ellen Barkin was cast and rehearsed the role, but injured her arm before actually performing it. Moira Harris, wife of Gary Sinise, also performed the leading role.

The play premiered in London at the National Theatre, Cottesloe Theatre on October 4, 1984, directed by Peter Gill and starring Ian Charleson and Julie Walters. The play transferred to the Lyric Theatre on February 4, 1985.

The first London revival was in 1991, at the Timber Street Studios, presented by Yvonne Bachem. with Donna King as May, Ed Bishop as the Old Man, Barry O'Rorke as Eddie, and Gordon Winter as Martin. The Theatre Record reviewer reported that King gave a performance of great subtlety.

The play was revived again at the Apollo Theatre in London in 2006, with Martin Henderson and Juliette Lewis playing the lead roles in a production directed by Lindsay Posner. The play was revived again at Riverside Studios in London in 2010, with Carl Barât and Sadie Frost in the lead roles.

The play had its Massachusetts premiere at the Williamstown Theatre Festival in Williamstown, Massachusetts, on July 24, 2014. It starred Sam Rockwell as Eddie and Nina Arianda as May, with direction by Daniel Aukin. Arianda and Rockwell then reprised their roles in the play's Broadway debut at the Samuel J. Friedman Theatre in a Manhattan Theatre Club production directed by Aukin in October to December 2015.

== Awards and nominations ==
Fool for Love was a finalist for the 1984 Pulitzer Prize for Drama.

The play won the 1984 Obie Awards for: Direction (Sam Shepard), Best New American Play, and Performance: Ed Harris, Kathy Baker and Will Patton.

Ian Charleson was nominated for the 1984 Olivier Award, Actor of the Year in a New Play; Julie Walters was nominated for the 1984 Olivier Award, Actress of the Year in a New Play.

== Film adaptation ==
In the 1985 film version, Shepard himself played the lead, with Kim Basinger as his female lead. The film was directed by Robert Altman.
