= Alien Autopsy (2006 film) =

2006 film by Jonny Campbell

- Theatrical release poster
- Directed by: Jonny Campbell
- Written by: William Davies
- Produced by: William Davies; Barnaby Thompson
- Starring: Ant & Dec; Bill Pullman; Harry Dean Stanton; Omid Djalili; Jimmy Carr
- Cinematography: Simon Chaudoir
- Edited by: Oral Norrie Ottey
- Music by: Murray Gold
- Production companies: Qwerty Films; Ealing Studios; Fragile Films
- Distributed by: Warner Bros. Pictures
- Release date: 7 April 2006
- Running time: 95 minutes
- Country: United Kingdom
- Language: English
- Budget: £5 million
- Box office: £2.4 million

Alien Autopsy (stylised with "lie" highlighted) is a 2006 British comedy film with elements of science fiction directed by Jonny Campbell. Written by William Davies, it relates the events surrounding the infamous "alien autopsy" film promoted by Ray Santilli and stars Ant & Dec, as Santilli and Gary Shoefield. The film was a moderate commercial success domestically, making no. 3 on the British box office chart.

== Plot ==
The film is framed by Ray Santilli and his friend Gary Shoefield retelling the events to a documentary maker named Morgan Banner.

In 1995, Ray and Gary go to the United States to find Elvis memorabilia to sell on the market stall Ray runs in London. A former US Army cameraman, Harvey, sells them a silent black and white film of Elvis performing live, but later returns with an intriguing offer. Harvey takes Ray to Miami, Florida to see a film from 1947, showing the autopsy of an alien supposedly killed in a UFO crash in Roswell, New Mexico. Harvey wants to sell the film for $30,000.

Gary and Ray return to England to look for an investor to give them the money. Ray convinces Laszlo Voros, a Hungarian homosexual art and drug dealer obsessed with crop circles, to give him the $30,000 and retrieves the film from Harvey. Back in England, the pair discover that the film has degraded from humidity and heat and is now completely unwatchable. In order to avoid serious repercussions from Voros, they decide to make their own recreation of it. They base the content on Ray's memories of the original, and, with the help of some friends, fashion a convincing replica of the dead alien using a mannequin and meat products obtained from a friend's butcher's shop, turn the living room of Gary's sister into a film set, and shoot the film on a Bell and Howell spring-wound camera. Ray gives a copy of the final product to Voros, who believes it to be real.

Having convinced Voros, Ray and Gary decide to sell the film to other venues, earning them a large sum of money. However, when Voros hears about its international distribution, he demands 80% of the profits. A potential clash is averted when Voros is killed by a green Land Rover while standing naked in the middle of a crop circle, leading to speculation that he has been killed by a CIA agent.

Ray and Gary travel to Argentina to promote the film, followed by reporter Amber Fuentes, who seduces Ray. She eventually tracks down Harvey, who demands from Ray and Gary that they maintain his anonymity. To fulfil this obligation, they produce an interview with a homeless former actor playing Harvey, which convinces Amber. She remains sceptical, however, about the film's authenticity.

Ray and Gary are now persuaded that some of the original 1947 footage might actually be recovered by film restoration experts in order to be viewed. However, after viewing the results, the pair bury the film, telling each other that they cannot continue with the endeavour.

== Cast ==
- Declan Donnelly as Ray Santilli
- Anthony McPartlin as Gary Shoefield
- Bill Pullman as Morgan Banner
- Götz Otto as Laszlo Voros
- Morwenna Banks as Jasmine
- Omid Djalili as Melik
- Harry Dean Stanton as Harvey
  - Michael Rouse as Young Harvey
- Mike Blakeley and Matthew Blakeley as The Camera Team
- John Shrapnel as Michael Kuhn
- Madeleine Moffatt as Nan
- John Cater as Maurice
- Lee Oakes as Edgar
- Perry Benson as Trading Standards Officer
- Jimmy Carr as Gary's Manager
- Winston Thomas as Zachary
- Pam Shaw as Aunty P.
- David Threlfall as Jeffrey, Film Restorer
- Andrew Greenough as Preston
- Stephanie Metcalfe as Doreen
- Jonathan Coy as The Museum Director
- Ian Porter as Pentagon Officer
- Shane Rimmer as Colonel
- Naima Belkhiati as French TV Buyer
- Miguel Angel Plaza as Mr. Gonzalez
- Jeff Harding as CIA Agent
- Kevin Breznahan as Junior TV Executive
- Martin McDougall as Middle-Ranking TV Executive
- Lachele Carl as TV News Anchor
- Paul Birchard as Senior TV Executive
- Sam Douglas as The Network President
- Adriana Yanez as The Stewardess, Argentina
- Nichole Hiltz as Amber Fuentes
- Luis Soto as Peruvian TV Host
- Christina Piaget as The Interviewer
- Christina Souza as The Stewardess, Mexicana
- Bradley Lavelle as New York Host
- Orson Bean as Homeless Man
- Sophia Ellis as UFO Enthusiast
- Jonathan Frakes as Himself

The film also contains brief appearances by Ray Santilli and Gary Shoefield.

== Reception ==
The film received mainly positive reviews, earning a 75% approval rating on Rotten Tomatoes based on eight reviews.

== Releases ==
The film was released as a Region 2 DVD by Warner Home Video on 3 July 2006. In America, the film was released as a Region 1 DVD by Warner Home Video on 21 September 2010.

== Soundtrack ==
- Supergrass – "Alright"
- Pete Moore – "Asteroid"
- The Beloved – "Sweet Harmony"
- Stakka Bo – "Here We Go"
- The Monkees – "I'm a Believer"
- Stereo MC's – "Step It Up"
- Tom Jones – "If Only I Knew"
- Nouvelle Vague – "Just Can't Get Enough"
- Son of Dork – "We're Not Alone"
- Babylon Zoo - "Spaceman"
