= The New Group =

New York City theatre company

- Formation: 1995
- Founder: Scott Elliott
- Type: Off-Broadway
- Location(s): Theater at St. Clement's Church; New York City
- Artistic director: Scott Elliott
- Website: thenewgroup.org

The New Group, is a New York City Off-Broadway theatrical troupe founded by Artistic Director Scott Elliott, that produced its first play, Mike Leigh's Ecstasy, in 1995. The New Group is run by founding Artistic Director, Scott Elliott, and Executive Director, Adam Bernstein.

The New Group was recognized with the 2004 Tony Award for Best Musical for Avenue Q originated at the Vineyard Theatre in 2003.

== Building history ==
Since 2003 the home theatre for the group has mostly been on West 42nd Street on Theatre Row. The main theatres since founding are:

- 1995 – John Houseman Theatre
- 1996–1998 – INTAR Theatre
- 1999–2003 – Theater at St. Clement's Church
- 2003–2014 – Acorn Theatre
- 2014–Present – Pershing Square Signature Center

In November 2025, the New Group announced that they would be moving into the Theatre at St. Clement's, with plans to begin producing shows there in 2026.

== Production history ==
- 1995
  - Ecstasy by Mike Leigh, directed by Scott Elliott
- 1996
  - Curtains by Stephen Bill, directed by Scott Elliott
- 1996–1997
  - This Is Our Youth by Kenneth Lonergan, directed by Mark Brokaw
  - The Flatted Fifth by Seth Zvi Rosenfeld, directed by Jo Bonney
  - My Night With Reg by Kevin Elyot, directed by Jack Hofsiss
- 1997–1998
  - Goose-Pimples by Mike Leigh, directed by Scott Elliott
  - Hazelwood Jr. High by Rob Urbinati, directed by Scott Elliott
  - The Fastest Clock in the Universe by Philip Ridley, directed by Jo Bonney
- 1998–1999
  - Some Voices by Joe Penhall, directed by Frank Pugliese
  - Halfway Home by Diane Bank, directed by Stephen Williford
  - East is East by Ayub Khan-Din, directed by Scott Elliott
- 1999–2000
  - Cranes by Dmitry Lipkin, directed by Scott Elliott
  - Another American: Asking and Telling by Marc Wolf, directed by Joe Mantello
  - Betwixt by David Cale, directed by Scott Elliott and Andy Goldberg
- 2000–2001
  - What the Butler Saw by Joe Orton, directed by Scott Elliott
  - Paradise Island by Benjie Aerenson, directed by Andy Goldberg
  - Servicemen by Evan Smith, directed by Sean Mathias
- 2001–2002
  - Good Thing by Jessica Goldberg, directed by Jo Bonney
  - Smelling a Rat by Mike Leigh, directed by Scott Elliott
- 2002–2003
  - Comedians by Trevor Griffiths, directed by Scott Elliott
  - Avenue Q music & lyrics by Robert Lopez and Jeff Marx, book by Jeff Whitty, directed by Jason Moore
  - The Women of Lockerbie by Deborah Brevoort, directed by Scott Elliott
- 2003–2004
  - Aunt Dan and Lemon by Wallace Shawn, directed by Scott Elliott
  - Roar by Betty Shamieh, directed by Marion McClinton
- 2004–2005
  - SIN (A Cardinal Deposed) by Michael Murphy, directed by Carl Forsman
  - A Likely Story by David Cale, directed by Tamara Jenkins
  - Hurlyburly by David Rabe, directed by Scott Elliott
  - Critical Darling by Barry Levey, directed by Ian Morgan
  - Terrorism by The Presnyakov Brothers, translated by Sasha Dugdale, directed by Will Frears
- 2005–2006
  - Abigail's Party by Mike Leigh, directed by Scott Elliott
  - The Music Teacher words by Wallace Shawn, music by Allen Shawn, directed by Tom Cairns
  - A Spalding Gray Matter written and performed by Michael Brandt, directed by Ian Morgan
  - Jayson with a Y by Darci Picoult, directed by Sheryl Kaller
  - Everythings Thurning into Beautiful by Seth Zvi Rosenfeld, directed by Carl Forsman
- 2006–2007
  - The Prime of Miss Jean Brodie by Jay Presson Allen, directed by Scott Elliott
  - The Fever by Wallace Shawn, directed by Scott Elliott
  - The Accomplices by Bernard Weinraub, directed by Ian Morgan
  - Expats by Heather Lynn MacDonald, directed by Ari Edelson
  - Strangers Knocking by Robert Tenges, directed by Marie Masters
- 2007–2008
  - Things We Want by Jonathan Marc Sherman, directed by Ethan Hawke
  - Two Thousand Years by Mike Leigh, directed by Scott Elliott
  - Rafta, Rafta... by Ayub Khan-Din, directed by Scott Elliott
  - Rich Boyfriend by Evan Smith, directed by Ian Morgan
- 2008–2009
  - Mouth to Mouth by Kevin Elyot, directed by Mark Brokaw
  - Mourning Becomes Electra by Eugene O'Neill, directed by Scott Elliott
  - Groundswell by Ian Bruce, directed by Scott Elliott
- 2009–2010
  - The Starry Messenger written and directed by Kenneth Lonergan
  - A Lie of the Mind by Sam Shepard, directed by Ethan Hawke
  - The Kid by Andy Monroe, Michael Zam and Jack Lechner, based on the book by Dan Savage, directed by Scott Elliott
- 2010–2011
  - Blood From A Stone by Tommy Nohilly, directed by Scott Elliott
  - Marie and Bruce by Wallace Shawn, directed by Scott Elliott
  - One Arm based on the short story and screenplay by Tennessee Williams, adapted for the stage and directed by Moisés Kaufman
- 2011–2012
  - Burning by Thomas Bradshaw, directed by Scott Elliott
  - Russian Transport by Erika Sheffer, directed by Scott Elliott
  - An Early History of Fire by David Rabe, directed by Jo Bonney
- 2012–2013
  - The Good Mother by Francine Volpe, directed by Scott Elliott
  - Clive based on Bertolt Brecht's Baal retold by Jonathan Marc Sherman, directed by Ethan Hawke
  - Bunty Berman Presents..., book and lyrics by Ayub Khan Din, music by Ayub Khan Din and Paul Bogaev, directed by Scott Elliott
- 2013–2014
  - The Jacksonian by Beth Henley, directed by Robert Falls
  - Intimacy by Thomas Bradshaw, directed by Scott Elliott
  - Annapurna by Sharr White, directed by Bart DeLorenzo
- 2014–2015
  - Sticks and Bones by David Rabe, directed by Scott Elliott
  - Rasheeda Speaking by Joel Drake Johnson, directed by Cynthia Nixon
  - The Spoils by Jesse Eisenberg, directed by Scott Elliott
- 2015–2016
  - Mercury Fur by Philip Ridley, directed by Scott Elliott
  - Steve by Mark Gerrard, directed by Cynthia Nixon
  - Buried Child by Sam Shepard, directed by Scott Elliott
- 2016–2017
  - Sweet Charity by Cy Coleman, Dorothy Fields, Neil Simon
  - Evening at the Talk House by Wallace Shawn
  - The Whirlgig by Hamish Linklater
- 2017–2018
  - Downtown Race Riot by Seth Zvi Rosenfeld
  - Jerry Springer – The Opera by Richard Thomas and Stewart Lee
  - Good for Otto by David Rabe
  - Peace for Mary Frances by Lily Thorne
- 2021
  - Black No More book by John Ridley, Lyrics by Tariq Trotter, Music by Tariq Trotter, Anthony Tidd, James Poyser and Daryl Waters, directed by Scott Elliot
- 2022 - 2023 Season
  - Evanston Salt Costs Climbing by Will Arbery, Directed by Danya Taymor
  - The Seagull/ Woodstock, NY by Thomas Bradshaw (Adapted from The Seagull by Anton Checkov), directed by Scott Elliot
  - Bernarda's Daughters by Diane Exavier, directed by Dominique Rider
- 2023 - 2024 Season
  - Sabbath's Theater by John Turturro and Ariel Levy, directed by Jo Bonney (adapted from the book by Phillip Roth)
  - The Seven Year Disappear By Jordan Seavey, directed by Scott Elliot starring Cynthia Nixon
  - All of Me by Laura Winters, directed by Ashley Brooke Monroe
- 2024 - 2025 Season
  - Babe by Jessica Goldberg, directed by Scott Elliot
  - Curse of the Starving Class By Sam Shepard, directed by Scott Elliot starring Cooper Hoffman,Calista Flockhart & Christian Slater
  - The Last Bimbo of the Apocolypse Book, music and lyrics by Michael Breslin, book, Additional music and lyrics by Patrick Foley, Choreographed by Jack Ferver, directed by and developed with Rory Pelsue

== Premieres ==
The New Group has produced numerous world premieres including Steve, The Spoils, Intimacy, Burning, Russian Transport, Blood From a Stone, The Starry Messenger, The Accomplices, and Avenue Q.
