= Grace Kennedy (singer) =

British television presenter and singer

- Born: Montego Bay, Jamaica
- Occupation(s): singer, television presenter, actress, entrepreneur
- Known for: top UK and US charts hit songs; TV entertainment show; (BAFTA award): Magnum, P.I. actress role; luxury events designer
- Television: Grace Kennedy Show

Grace Kennedy is a British, BAFTA award winning, television presenter and recording artist with UK and US charts hit songs.

== Singer ==
Grace Kennedy first came into the public eye after winning the TV talent show Opportunity Knocks in 1977 and then also featuring in a 1979 episode of Star Treatment.

In the next years, she developed a successful musical career, with albums and singles released by DJM Records and BBC labels. Many tracks were arrangements by Peter Knight and John Coleman. "Starting Again" reached number 34 on the US Dance Songs chart, and she featured on the charity single "The Wishing Well" which reached number 22 in the UK.

Her interpretation of "'Love Is Serious Business" turned into a Northern soul alternative female version of the Alfie Davidson classic, with a rare Canadian Rio Records release, as it was typical of many Northern soul records.

In 2021–2022, her music albums were digitalized and released on the major download platforms.

== Discography ==
- Grace Kennedy (1979)
- Desire (1979)
- I'm Starting Again (1981)
- One Voice (1981)

== Television presenter and actress ==
In 1981, Grace Kennedy was signed by the BBC to present her own primetime entertainment show, which ran for three series between 1981–1983 and won a BAFTA award. Guests included Bruce Forsyth, Al Jarreau, The Pointer Sisters and Derek Griffiths.

She has appeared on other series, among them The Royal Variety Performance, Live From Her Majesty's, String Sound, Saturday Night is Gala Night, Home on Sunday, Lena Zavaroni and Music, The Good Old Days, Des O'Connor Tonight, The Les Dawson Show, The Rod and Emu Show.

She was also a featured actor with Tom Selleck in a 2 part special of Magnum, P.I.

Onstage, Kennedy starred in the 1992 West End Cotton Club musical revue, the 1994 production of Carmen Jones (directed by actor Simon Callow) and the 2005 production of Thoroughly Modern Millie alongside Lesley Joseph, Elaine C Smith and Donna Steele.

== Luxury events designer ==
Kennedy founded and is the managing director of Grace Kennedy Events, a luxury event planning business which organises high end luxury/celebrity parties. She transitioned into this field through the experience she acquired in organising her own concerts and stage events. After being approached by Toyota to sing and organise the production of six concerts to launch a new car in Dubai and Abu Dhabi, she continued by arranging further concerts and gala events for companies such as Renault, Tetra Pak, British Airways and Gillette. She then expanded her business by designing and organising luxury celebrity and society events. In June 2011, she organised the wedding of Vincent and Carla Kompany.

In 2014, she was invited to present several awards at The Luxury Lifestyle Awards ceremony.

In 2018, she launched The Luxurious Destination Collection as the signature brand of Grace Kennedy Events. The collection is a partnership with a network of luxury destinations in the world handpicked by Grace, like Blenheim Palace, the Mandarin Oriental, the Royal Mansour and several discreet private islands, where the clients enjoy exclusive personal and bespoke options. There are three categories of destinations, In the Country (palaces, stately homes in places like Britain, the French Riviera, Lake Como Italy, the Spanish mountains), In the City (in Morocco, Dubai, Europe etc.), By the Sea (such as some private islands in the Caribbean, Maldive).

== Personal life ==
Grace Kennedy has a daughter, Natalie (Winsor), from her first marriage, herself a successful actress. Her second marriage was to entertainment lawyer and entrepreneur Nigel Angel, in 1999.

== Charity ==
Grace Kennedy is an ambassador for the National Foundation for Retired Service Animals. She recorded a fund raising top 20 single with Boy George for "The Wishing Well" Appeal Great Ormond Street Hospital.

Additionally Grace supports the following:

- Royal Variety Performance
- Variety The children’s Charity
- Guys & St Thomas Hospital trust
- Sportsman Aid Society
- Royal Gala charity
- Candlelight Ball charity Gala
- Starlight children’s foundation Charity Gala
- Mayflower Gala Charity Show
- Joy to the World, The Royal Albert Hall
- Foundation for Children with Leukemia
