= James Gammon =

American actor (1940–2010)

- Gammon c. 1980s
- Born: April 20, 1940; Newman, Illinois, U.S.
- Died: July 16, 2010 (aged 70); Costa Mesa, California, U.S.
- Occupation: Actor
- Years active: 1966–2009
- Spouse: Nancy Jane Kapusta (m. 1972)
- Children: 2

James Richard Gammon (April 20, 1940 – July 16, 2010) was an American actor, known for playing grizzled "good ol' boy" types in numerous films and television series. Gammon portrayed Lou Brown, the manager of fictionalized versions of the Cleveland Indians in the movies Major League and Major League II. He was also known for his role as the retired longshoreman Nick Bridges on the CBS television crime drama Nash Bridges.

== Biography ==
=== Early life ===
Gammon was born in Newman, Illinois, the son of Doris Latimer (née Toppe), a farm girl, and Donald Gammon, a musician. After his parents divorced, he made his way to Orlando, Florida. He worked at Orlando's ABC TV affiliate WLOF-TV (Channel 9), as a cameraman and director. In his 20s, he moved to Hollywood to find work.

=== Acting career ===
In the 1970s, Gammon helped found the Met Theatre in Los Angeles. While performing there, a representative from The Public Theater saw him and had him cast as Weston in Sam Shepard's Curse of the Starving Class in 1978. The two became friends afterward. He made his sole Broadway appearance as Dodge in a revival of Sam Shepard's Buried Child. He was nominated for a Tony Award for his performance. He appeared on stage in Sam Shepard's San Francisco debut of The Late Henry Moss along with Nick Nolte, Sean Penn, Cheech Marin (both from Nash Bridges), and Woody Harrelson in 2000.

Gammon may be best remembered for his characters Lou Brown, manager of the Cleveland Indians in the Major League films; and Nick Bridges, the father of Don Johnson's title character in the television series Nash Bridges. He appeared in the films Cool Hand Luke (1967), Macon County Line (1974), Urban Cowboy (1980), Any Which Way You Can (1980), Silverado (1985), Noon Wine (1985), The Milagro Beanfield War (1988), Major League (1989), Revenge (1990), The Adventures of Huck Finn (1993), Major League II (1994), Wyatt Earp (1994), Wild Bill (1995), Truman (1995), The Hi-Lo Country (1998), Cold Mountain (2003), and more recently Appaloosa (2008). He also had an uncredited role in Natural Born Killers (1994).

Gammon portrayed a Korean War veteran on the hit ABC series Grey's Anatomy. He played Charles Goodnight in Streets of Laredo. In 2006, he played the stern grandfather, Sam, brother of notorious outlaw Butch Cassidy, in the film Outlaw Trail: The Treasure of Butch Cassidy.

Gammon provided the voices of the animated characters Marv Loach and Floyd Turbeaux in the 1999 Warner Bros. feature film The Iron Giant.

== Personal life ==
His first marriage ended in divorce. He has a brother, Philip, and a sister, Sandra (Glaudell). He was married to Nancy Jane Kapusta from 1972 until his death. He had two daughters, Allison Mann and Amy Gammon.

== Death and legacy ==
Gammon died of adrenal gland and liver cancer in Costa Mesa, California, at the age of 70.

His friend Sam Shepard paid tribute to Gammon, saying: "You're probably aware of the notorious father figures in my plays, alcoholic Midwesterners who leave their families and get lost in the Southwestern desert. Jimmy had that familiarity about him with the way I grew up, the guys with the voice and the face and the whiskey. He definitely rang a bell with me."

== Filmography ==
=== Film ===
James Gammon film credits
Year	Title	Role	Notes
1967	Cool Hand Luke	"Sleepy"	Uncredited, Supporting Role
1968	Journey to Shiloh	Tellis Yeager	Supporting Role
1969	The Thousand Plane Raid	Major Varga	Supporting Role
1970	A Man Called Horse	Ed	Supporting Role
1970	Macho Callahan	Cowboy	Supporting Role
1970	The Intruders (filmed in 1967)	Chaunce Dykstra	TV movie, Supporting Role
1972	Cry for Me, Billy	Amos	Supporting Role
1974	Zandy's Bride	Man In Gunfight	Uncredited
1974	Macon County Line	Elisha	Supporting Role
1975	The Wild McCullochs	1st Police Officer	Supporting Role
1975	The Kansas City Massacre	Garth	TV movie, Supporting Role
1976	Bobbie Jo and the Outlaw	Leather Salesman	Minor Role
1976	The Pom Pom Girls	Coach	Minor Role
1977	Black Oak Conspiracy	Deputy	Minor Role
1977	The Greatest	Mr. Harry	Minor Role
1979	The Sacketts	Wesley "Wes" Bigelow	TV movie
1980	On the Nickel	John "Peanut John"	Supporting Role
1980	Urban Cowboy	Steve Strange	Supporting Role
1980	Rage!	Joe Dean	TV movie
1980	It's My Turn	Connie Foxworth	Uncredited
1980	Any Which Way You Can	The Palomino Bartender	Supporting Role
1980	Below the Belt	Luke	Supporting Role
1981	The Big Black Pill	Captain Jake Jacqualone	TV movie
1982	Deadly Encounter	Frank Kitchens	TV movie
1982	The Ballad of Gregorio Cortez	Sheriff Frank Fly	
1983	M.A.D.D.: Mothers Against Drunk Drivers	Willard Kohler	TV movie
1983	Women of San Quentin	Officer	TV movie
1985	Noon Wine	Sheriff	TV movie
1985	Vision Quest	Mr. Kuchera	Supporting Role
1985	Hell Town	Lieutenant Raymond Tracy	TV movie
1985	Sylvester	Steve	Supporting Role
1985	Silverado	Dawson	Supporting Role
1985	The Long Hot Summer	Billy Quick	TV movie
1985	Silver Bullet	Arnie Westrum	Supporting Role
1986	Hard Traveling	Sergeant Slattery	Supporting Role
1987	Made in Heaven	Steve Shea	Supporting Role
1987	Laguna Heat	Grimes	TV movie
1987	Ironweed	Reverend Chester	Supporting Role
1988	The Milagro Beanfield War	"Horsethief Shorty" Wilson	Supporting Role
1989	Major League	Lou Brown	
1989	Roe vs. Wade	Jimmy Russell	TV movie
1990	Revenge	Texan	Supporting Role
1990	Coupe de Ville	Dr. Sturgeon the Cadillac Surgeon	Supporting Role
1990	I Love You to Death	Lieutenant Larry Schooner	Supporting Role
1991	Conagher	"Smoke" Parnell, Ladder Five Owner	TV movie
1991	Stranger at My Door	Sheriff Bitterman	TV movie
1992	Leaving Normal	Walt	Supporting Role
1992	CrissCross	Emmett	Supporting Role
1992	Criminal Behavior	Roy Stubbs	TV movie
1993	Men Don't Tell	Jack MacAffrey	TV movie
1993	The Adventures of Huck Finn	Deputy Hines	Supporting Role
1993	Running Cool	"Ironbutt" Garrett	Supporting Role
1993	Painted Desert	Al	Supporting Role
1994	Cabin Boy	"Pappy"	Supporting Role
1994	Major League II	Lou Brown	Supporting Role
1994	Wyatt Earp	Mr. Sutherland	Supporting Role
1994	Hard Vice	Bronski	Supporting Role
1994	Natural Born Killers	Redneck's Buddy In The Diner	Uncredited, Supporting Role
1995	Truman	Sam Rayburn	TV movie
1995	Wild Bill	Moses "California Joe" Milner	Supporting Role
1996	Two Mothers for Zachary	Chalmer	TV movie
1997	Traveller	"Double D"	Supporting Role
1997	The Apostle	Brother Edwards	Uncredited
1998	The Man in the Iron Mask	The Commandant	Supporting Role
1998	Point Blank	Dad	Supporting Role
1998	Love from Ground Zero	Hat	Supporting Role
1998	Logan's War: Bound by Honor	Ben	TV movie
1998	The Hi-Lo Country	Hoover Young	Supporting Role
1999	You Know My Name	Real Arkansas Tom	TV movie
1999	The Iron Giant	Marvin "Marv" Loach / Floyd Turbeaux	Voice
1999	One Man's Hero	General Zachary Taylor	Supporting Role
2000	The Cell	Teddy Lee	Supporting Role
2002	Life or Something Like It	Pat Kerrigan	Supporting Role
2002	The Country Bears	Big Al	Voice
2003	Monte Walsh	Joe "Fighting Joe" Hooker / Albert Miller	TV movie
2003	Cold Mountain	Esco Swanger	Supporting Role
2004	Silver City	Sheriff Joe Skaggs	Supporting Role
2004	Paradise	Old Cowboy	TV movie
2005	Don't Come Knocking	Old Ranch Hand	Supporting Role
2006	Outlaw Trail: The Treasure of Butch Cassidy	Sam Parker	Supporting Role
2006	The Far Side of Jericho	The Preacher	Supporting Role
2006	Altered	Sheriff Henderson	Supporting Role
2006	What I Did for Love	Karl Ryder	TV movie
2007	Jesse Stone: Sea Change	Bob	TV movie
2007	The Final Season	Jared Akers	Supporting Role
2008	Appaloosa	Earl May	Supporting Role
2009	In the Electric Mist	Ben Hebert	Supporting Role
2009	Convict	The Sheriff	
2009	The New Daughter	Roger Wayne	(final film role)

=== Television ===
James Gammon television credits
Year	Title	Role	Episodes	Notes
1966	The Wild Wild West	Egan	The Night of the Freebooters	Episodic character
1966	The Monroes	Stennis	Night of the Wolf	Episodic character
1966-1967	The Road West	Deputy Virgil Bramley / Pete Fowler	The Agreement (1967) / The Gunfighter (1966)	Episodic character
1966-1973	Gunsmoke	Arnie Jeffords / Dudley	My Father, My Son (1966) / Susan Was Evil (1973)	Episodic character
1967	Captain Nice	—	Whatever Lola Wants	Episodic character
1967	Bonanza	Harry Jeffers	The Man Without Land	Episodic character
1967	The Invaders	Hal	The Spores	Episodic character
1967	Batman	Osiris	The Unkindest Tut of All	Episodic character
1967	The Felony Squad	Mickey	Ordeal by Terror	Episodic character
1967	The Virginian	Cal Mason	A Small Taste of Justice	Episodic character
1968-1969	Lancer	Clint Meek / Wes	Blind Man's Bluff (1969) / Chase a Wild Horse (1968)	Episodic character
1970	The High Chaparral	Lafe	Only the Bad Come to Sonora (1970)	Episodic character
1971-1974	The F.B.I.	Cauldwell / Ben McCarty	Diamond Run (1974) / Turnabout (1971)	Episodic character
1971-1976	Cannon	Sheriff Ryder / Keely	The Quasar Kill (1976) / Country Blues (1971)	Episodic character
1973	Dusty's Trail	Roy	Horse of Another Color (1973)	Episodic character
1973-1975	The Waltons	Zack Rosswell	8 Episodes (1973–1975)	Recurring Character
1974	Kung Fu	Jake	The Nature of Evil (1974)	Episodic character
1975	Barnaby Jones	Andy Lucker	The Final Burial (1974)	Episodic character
1976	Petrocelli	Harry	Blood Money (1976)	Episodic character
1976	Most Wanted	—	The Torch (1976)	Episodic character
1977-1978	Charlie's Angels	Gates / Billy	Angels in the Stretch (1978) / Angels on Ice (1977)	Episodic character
1979	Lou Grant	—	Samaritan (1979)	Episodic character
1984	The Master	—	A Place to Call Home (1984)	Episodic character
1984	Cagney & Lacey	Brian Holgate	Old Debts (1984)	Episodic character
1985	Murder, She Wrote	Billy Don Baker	Armed Response (1985)	Episodic character
1986	The Equalizer	Michael Cub	Episode: "Out of the Past"	Episodic character
1987	Crime Story	Jack Claymore	The Pinnacle; The Survivor (1987)	Episodic character
1987	American Playhouse	Clate Connaloe	Stacking (1987)	Episodic character
1988	Lincoln	General Ulysses S. Grant	2 episodes	television film
1989	Midnight Caller	Pete Hanrahan	Tarnished Shield (1989)	Episodic character
1989	In the Heat of the Night	Sheriff Ketch Monroe	A Trip Upstate (1986)	Episodic character
1990-1991	Bagdad Cafe	Rudy	15 Episodes (1990–1991)	Recurring Character
1991	The Young Riders	Elias Mills	The Blood of Others (1991)	Episodic Character
1992	The Young Indiana Jones Chronicles	Teddy Roosevelt	British East Africa, September 1909 (1992)	Episodic Character
1992-1993	Homefront	Coach Zelnick	8 Episodes (1992–1993)	Recurring Character
1993-1994	L.A. Law	Reverend Joseph Halliday / Thomas Quinn	God is My Co-Counsel (1994) / F.O.B. (1993)	Episodic Character
1996-2001	Nash Bridges	Nick Bridges	49 Episodes (1996–2001)	Recurring Character
1999	Tracey Takes On...	Uncle Shep	"Hype" (1999)	Episodic Character
2003	Fillmore!	"Doc" Hemlock	Two Wheels, Full Throtle, No Brakes (2003)	Voice
2004	LAX	Bill Barkley	The Longest Morning (2004)	Episodic Character
2004	Crossing Jordan	Olin Price	Justice Delayed (2004)	Episodic Character
2007	Monk	Oates	Mr. Monk Visits a Farm (2007)	Episodic Character
2007	Grey's Anatomy	Mr. Scofield	Scars and Souvenirs (2007)	Episodic Character

=== Stage ===
Year	Title	Role	Notes
1978	Curse of the Starving Class	Weston	The Public Theater, Off-Broadway
1985	A Lie of the Mind	Baylor	Promenade Theater, Off-Broadway
1996	Buried Child	Dodge	Brooks Atkinson Theatre, Broadway
2000	The Late Henry Moss	Moss Sr.	Magic Theater
