= Curse of the Starving Class =

Play by Sam Shepard

- Original language: English
- Written by: Sam Shepard
- Characters: Wesley; Ella; Emma; Taylor; Weston; Ellis; Malcolm; Emerson; Slater
- Genre: Drama
- Setting: A derelict farm house in the California Central Valley

Premiere
- Date: 21 April 1977
- Place: Royal Court Theatre, London

Curse of the Starving Class is a play by Sam Shepard, considered the first of a series on family tragedies. Some critics consider it part of a Family Trilogy that includes Buried Child (1979) and True West (1980). Others consider it part of a quintet that includes Fool for Love (1983) and A Lie of the Mind (1985). The play was commissioned by Joseph Papp and premiered in London in 1977 before playing at Papp's New York Shakespeare Festival in 1978.

== Production history ==
The play was initially produced in London at the Royal Court Theatre on April 21, 1977, directed by Nancy Meckler. The play was commissioned by Joseph Papp.

Curse of the Starving Class was premiered Off-Broadway at the New York Shakespeare Festival, on March 2, 1978, presented by Papp. It closed on April 9, 1978. The cast was as follows:

- Wesley – Ebbe Roe Smith
- Ella – Olympia Dukakis
- Emma – Pamela Reed
- Taylor – Kenneth Welsh
- Weston – James Gammon
- Ellis – Eddie Jones
- Malcolm – John Aquino
- Emerson – Michael J. Pollard
- Slater – Raymond J. Barry
- Directed by Robert Woodruff
- Setting and Costumes by Santo Loquasto
- Lighting by Martin Tudor
- Music by Bob Feldman

The play was revived Off-Broadway at the Promenade Theatre from July 30, 1985, to February 16, 1986. Directed by Robin Lynn Smith, the cast featured Kathy Bates (Ella) and Bradley Whitford (Wesley).

The play was produced at Yale Repertory Theatre, New Haven, Connecticut, in February 2000, directed by Jim Simpson and featuring Kristine Nielsen, Guy Boyd, Mandy Siegfried, Danny Seckel, Paul Boocock, Ron Faber, Steve Mellor, Dan Moran and Chime Serra. The production had original live rock, blues, jazz, punk, and Latin-style music, composed and arranged by Steve Bargonetti and Diane Gioia.

Curse of the Starving Class won the 1976–77 Obie Award for Best New American Play.

An off-Broadway revival starring Calista Flockhart, Christian Slater, Cooper Hoffman and Stella Marcus premiered at the Pershing Square Signature Center on February 4, 2025.

== Theme ==
Curse of the Starving Class "balances dark comedy and biting satire in its look at a family fighting to stay alive" according to the Long Wharf Theatre. It focuses on the disturbed Tate family — the drunken father, burned-out mother, rebellious teenage daughter and idealistic son — as they struggle for control of the rundown family farm in a futile search for freedom, security and, ultimately, meaning in their lives.

== Plot summary ==
=== Act I ===
The play opens with Wesley putting pieces of a broken down door into a wheelbarrow. Ella, his mother, enters and they begin to discuss the events of the night before that lead to Wesley's father, Weston, breaking down the door. Wesley begins a monologue narrating exactly what he saw and heard happen from the night before. Wesley then leaves and Ella begins to give a motherly talk on what happens during menstruation and what cannot be done during the cycle. Ella is on stage alone for the beginning of the talk, but her daughter, Emma, walks on stage mid-talk and joins the conversation as though she has been there all along. Ella then asks Emma what she is holding and Emma reminds her that these are her posters for the 4-H project on how to properly cut up a frying chicken that she has been working on quite some time. Emma goes to the refrigerator and begins to look for her chicken. Ella begins to act antsy and Emma realizes that Ella has boiled her chicken. Emma begins a rant about how she raised the chicken and hand fed it every day, then killed and cleaned it and her mother has gone and boiled it. Ella tries to feign innocence and Emma storms out. Wesley enters and decides that Emma's project is pointless and that she ought to focus on more important things. Emma returns, still furious, and the three begin an argument about the starving class and whether or not they are part of it. During their argument, Wesley goes to Emma's posters and begins to urinate on them. Ella points this out to Emma and Emma storms off, insisting that she is going to take the horse and run away. Ella tells Emma that the horse is crazy and that she is too young to leave home but Emma refuses to listen.

Ella tries to get Wesley to go down and stop Emma from taking the horse. Wesley refuses to stop Emma, and Ella begins to tell him about her plans to sell the house. Wesley is not happy with his mother's decision, and she continues to try and ask him to go stop Emma. Wesley still refuses to go after his sister, and Ella tells him that she is planning to use the money from the house to go to Europe and that he and Emma can come if they want. When Wesley tells her that there will not be enough money from the house to move to Europe Ella gets angry that Wesley is ruining her dream. Wesley then leaves and Emma returns, covered in mud after being thrown from the horse and dragged through the mud. Ella does not tell Emma that she plans to sell the house, but Emma tells Ella that she dreams of moving to Mexico and becoming a mechanic.

Ella goes to the back part of the house and Emma goes to the refrigerator. Emma asks the refrigerator why it does not have any food because they are not part of the starving class. She reassures the refrigerator that soon there will be little eggs, butter, and other foods tucked away inside of it. She then becomes angry with the refrigerator and slams it shut. When she turns around she finds that there is a man standing in the room with her. The man tells her that he was going to knock but that there was no door. Emma explains that her father broke the door down the night before in a drunken rage. The man tells her that his name is Taylor and that he is looking for her mother. She wants to know what he wants her mother for and he tells her that he is in the real-estate business and is helping her mother sell the house. Emma is enraged that her mother is selling the house and Taylor tries to convince her that selling the property is in their best interest. Emma tells Taylor that her family has violent tendencies caused by some family members having nitroglycerin, which is a very explosive element, in their blood.

Wesley then enters and sets up a small enclosure in the kitchen. He exits again and returns with a lamb, which he puts in the enclosure. Ella finally enters and says that she is going on a business luncheon with Taylor. Emma yells at Ella and exits. Ella leaves with Taylor, telling Wesley to take the lamb with the maggots back outside.

Weston enters, drunk, with a large bag of groceries. Weston talks to the lamb briefly, and then begins putting the groceries, which turn out to only be desert artichokes, in the refrigerator. Wesley enters and they discuss Weston's laundry and the best way to help the lamb with the maggots.

=== Act II ===
Act two opens on Wesley and Emma in the kitchen, where Wesley is building a new front door for the house. Emma and Wesley discuss whether their mother will come back, or whether she will run off to Mexico with Taylor. Wesley and Emma then argue over who is going to go add water to the artichokes that are boiling on the stove. Wesley does not want to do it because he is making the door and Emma does not want to do it because she is remaking her posters. Wesley says that Emma does not want to do it just because she is "on the rag", so she throws down her markers and gets up to add the water.

Wesley then explains to Emma that it is not typical homebuyers who are going to purchase the house, but that it is land developers. He compares it to a zombie invasion and takeover, where the zombies build their own city. He then suggests that they move away to some place safe, like Alaska.

Weston enters, even drunker than he was before. Emma is frightened by him, but Wesley tells her to stay calm. Weston asks where Ella is, and then goes into a rage when Wesley and Emma tell him where she went. Weston then tells them that he has already found someone who will buy the land and pay in cash. Emma, angry, leaves. Weston begins to tell Wesley about how he began to see the ‘poison’ in his own father, and how Wesley can see it in him. Weston tries to explain the poison to Wesley by comparing it to the way to you poison a coyote by putting strychnine in the belly of a dead lamb.

Wesley then tells Weston that Ella has also found a buyer for the house and Weston goes into a rage, and then collapses on a table and falls asleep. Ella returns with groceries that Taylor has bought for the family and throws out the artichokes. Wesley deduces that Taylor is the one who sold Weston worthless desert property in the first place. Ella talks about the curse that is plaguing their family. She tells Wesley that just when you think the curse has been beaten, and it has retreated back into the smallest cells of their genetics, it will suddenly reappear in full force.

Ellis, the owner of the “Alibi Club” walks into the house and sees Weston on the table. He tells Wesley and Emma that he has already purchased the house from Weston and shows them the cash. He pulls out the $1,500, telling them that is the amount that Weston owes to some “pretty hard fellas”. Wesley takes the money, offering to deliver it to the people his father owes money to. Ella tries to take the money from Wesley, but he tells her there is not enough to go to Europe on. Taylor then enters and Ella tells him what has happened. Taylor says that any deal Weston makes is void because he is considered incompetent by the state. Taylor declares that he will go to court and have the deed taken back and then buy the property from Ella, then leaves the house.

Sergeant Malcolm from the police department enters and tells Ella that Emma has been arrested for riding a horse into the “Alibi Club” and shooting the place full of holes. Ellis says that Weston must have sent Emma down there and takes back his $1,500 and runs off to his club, swearing he will get revenge on Weston. Ella goes downtown to get Emma out of jail.

=== Act III ===
This act opens with Weston, who is now clean, and sober. He has done his laundry, which is all nicely folded on the table, and the lamb is back in the kitchen. He tells the lamb a story about an eagle who was diving very close down to the ground trying to steal the testes of the lambs he was castrating. In the end he was cheering for the eagle. Wesley, who has been listening to this story, then asks what happens next. Weston becomes grumpy and refuses to tell the rest of the story. He asks what happened to Wesley, who had clearly been beaten up. Wesley tells him that he ran into a brick wall.

Weston tells Wesley that he has decided to stay and fix up the house instead of leaving, no matter who holds the deed. Weston says that when he woke up that morning, after sleeping on the table, that he felt like a new man and walked around their property naked to reclaim ownership. He then came inside and took a bath, made a big breakfast, drank some coffee, and did everyone's laundry. He tells Wesley to go clean up, and he wll make him a big breakfast. While Wesley is bathing, Weston yells in to him that he agrees to become an avocado grower for the Grower's Association.

Ella enters and she and Weston discuss Emma's shooting up of the club. Weston is proud of Emma, saying that it takes guts to do something like that at her age. Ella begins to yell at Weston for pulling a Jekyll and Hyde act by changing overnight. He tells her it was the night's sleep on the table that fixed everything. Ella pushes all the laundry to the floor and lies on the table. As she is falling asleep, and Weston is talking to her about the benefits of sleeping on the hard table, Wesley walks into the kitchen, naked, and takes the lamb outside.

Wesley re-enters, wearing his father's old clothes. He tells Weston that he has butchered the lamb for food. Weston yells at him, telling him that they did not need the food, because the refrigerator is full for once. Wesley then begins to gorge himself on all of the food in the refrigerator. Weston tries to calm Wesley down, and to wake Ella up, but cannot seem to do either. He declares to them that he is a whole new person, and Wesley, finally stopped eating, tells Weston that the men who are after him are going to kill him. At first, Weston cannot remember who all has loaned money to him, and begins to rant about how this is his home and nobody ought to be able to take it from him because he has nowhere else to go. Wesley tells him to take the Packard and escape to Mexico. Weston leaves.

Emma enters, carrying her riding crop. She asks Wesley why he is wearing their father's clothes. He tells her that as he put them on he could feel his own essence slipping out of him, and his father's essence coming into him. Wesley asks her how she got out of jail and she tells him that she made sexual overtures at the guard. She then pulls out a wad of cash and tells him that she is taking their mother's car and going into crime. As she leaves, Ella wakes up, mistakes Wesley for Weston, and tells him to go after Emma because she is too young to leave on her own. Wesley tells Ella to let Emma go and then there is a bright flash and a loud explosion from outside. Emerson, a small well dressed thug, enters, giggling about the explosion. His partner, Slater, enters after him, playing with the skinned lamb carcass. Since Ella is still under the impression that Wesley is Weston, Emerson and Slater also mistake Wesley for Weston. Wesley tries to tell them that Weston is his father. They tell him that they have blown up the car with Emma in it. The men tell Wesley, still calling him Weston, that he is to pass on the warning to his father and they leave.

Ella believes that Emma has left on the horse, and is not overly concerned about her. Looking at the lamb carcass, she asks Wesley to help her remember the story Weston always told about the eagle. They finish the story, saying that a tom cat had come to sniff around in the testes and the eagle picked it up. The tom cat and the eagle start fighting in midair, with the cat clawing out the eagle's chest, and the eagle trying to drop it. However, the tom cat will not let go because if it does it will fall and die. Instead, it chooses to bring the eagle down, even if it means certain doom for the cat as well.

The play ends with Ella and Wesley staring at the lamb carcass.

== Character summaries ==
The Tate family is a lower middle class, rural California family, trying to hold on to the last shreds of a family bond and traditional living.

Wesley Tate is the son of the family. Feeling strong ties to his family and to the land, Wesley maintains the farm after the others have given up. The prospect of selling the land to real estate developers has a significance far greater than the loss of a mere house, but his family. At times, Wesley loses patience with his family members, as evidenced by his lack of sympathy for his sister's ruined 4-H project, to which he responds by urinating on her charts and suggesting that his sister do something truly useful with her time.

Ella Tate is the mother of the family. As the play opens, she and Wesley are both looking through the chunks of the broken door that her husband, Weston, broke in a fit of rage. Ella is a highly dysfunctional individual with no capacity to cope with her husband's alcoholism. She often changes topics when she feels it in her best interest and tries to ignore the things going on immediately around her. Ella decides to take matters into her own hands and puts the house up for sale without consulting her husband.

Emma Tate is the daughter of Ella and Weston Tate. She has just started her first period, and has several mood swings during the play. Emma hates living with her family and repeatedly announces plans to leave home. She first tries to run away by taking the family horse, but it throws her off and drags her through the mud, so she comes back. Later, she becomes so angry about Ellis buying their house, she rides the family horse into his bar and shoots the place full of holes. Once she is arrested she says that she gains her freedom by offering sexual bribes to the sheriff. She then decides to steal her mother's car and take up a life of crime, claiming that it is the only way to make a real living in this world. In her attempt to steal the car, she is blown up with the car by the bomb that Slater puts in it.

Ellis is the owner of a bar, the Alibi Club, where Weston spends his time when he is not at home. Ellis is a greedy charlatan who tries to cheat the family out of their house. Ellis represents the greed and controlling nature of business owners and the tendency of these people to take unfair advantage of each other and people below them.

Emerson is a minor character who represents the men that Weston is in debt to. He and Slater, another minor character, only appear at the end of the production when they blow up Weston's car for compensation. He is a wicked man, a villain in the story.

Weston Tate is the father of the family and an abusive alcoholic. Incapable of driving or holding a job, he is a profoundly unstable man controlled by the alcohol that runs in his system. His violent nature and utter lack of accountability are the crux of many of the family's issues. He is easily taken advantage of and when his debts are not paid, it takes an even more terrifying toll on the people close to him.

Sergeant Malcom is the police officer who arrives at the house to inform Ella that Emma has been arrested for riding a horse into the “Alibi Club” and shooting it up. He is uninterested in the other crimes that Wesley and Ella accuse Taylor and Ellis of, stating that he is only there to tell Ella about Emma.

Taylor is a lawyer who is involved in real estate and is looking to buy the property from Ella. He is the representative for several large corporations that are looking to buy up land. He is also the same man who swindled Weston into buying the useless desert property.

Slater is Emerson's accomplice. He is the one who actually put the bomb in the car that kills Emma. He and Emerson represent the men that Weston owes money to, and have come to serve as a warning. Slater also brings the dead lamb's carcass into the house.

== Film adaptation ==
A 1994 film adaptation, Curse of the Starving Class, stars James Woods (Weston), Kathy Bates (Ella), Henry Thomas (Wesley), Randy Quaid (Taylor) and Jim Fitzpatrick (Emerson). The film was written by Bruce Beresford and directed by J. Michael McClary.

== Text ==
- Shepard, Sam (1984). Seven Plays. New York: Bantam Books. ISBN 0-553-34611-3.
