= Robert Woodruff (director) =

American theater director (born 1947)

Robert Woodruff (born 1947) is an American theater director.

== Early life ==
Woodruff graduated Phi Beta Kappa and magna cum laude from the University at Buffalo with a B.A. in political science. He has a master's degree in theater arts from San Francisco State University. He co-founded San Francisco's Eureka Theatre Company in 1972.

== Directing career ==
In 1976 Woodruff established the Bay Area Playwrights Festival, a summer forum for the development of new plays that is still flourishing. It was here that Woodruff first worked with the writer Sam Shepard, on a libretto that Shepard had developed for the national bicentennial celebrations, The Sad Lament of Pecos Bill on the Eve of Killing His Wife. The thirty-three-year-old playwright was still better known in London than the States, and his collaborations with Woodruff marked a turning point in both men's careers. For the next five years Woodruff was virtually the sole director of Shepard's work, staging the American premiere of Curse of the Starving Class at the New York Shakespeare Festival in 1978, the world premieres of Buried Child (1978) and True West (1980) at the Magic Theatre in San Francisco and then in New York, and the touring productions of Tongues and Savage/Love, which Shepard co-authored with the performer Joseph Chaikin.

Woodruff has directed plays performed at Lincoln Center Theater, the New York Shakespeare Festival, the Brooklyn Academy of Music, the American Conservatory Theater in San Francisco, and The Mark Taper Forum in Los Angeles. Internationally he has created productions at the Habima Theatre in Israel and Toneelgroep Amsterdam in the Netherlands. His work has been seen at the Sydney Festival, The Los Angeles Olympic Arts Festival (1984 Summer Olympics), The Edinburgh International Festival, The Hong Kong Festival of the Arts, The Jerusalem Festival and the Spoleto Festival USA. Opera premieres include The Sound of a Voice (American Repertory Theatre) and APPOMATTOX (San Francisco Opera) both by Philip Glass and Madame White Snake (Opera Boston, Beijing Music Festival) by Zhou Long (Pulitzer Prize Music 2010). He has taught at the University of California campuses at San Diego and Santa Barbara, New York University's Tisch School of the Arts and Columbia University.

In 2002, Woodruff succeeded Robert Brustein as the artistic director of the American Repertory Theater in Cambridge, Massachusetts. Woordruff left in 2007 when his contract was not renewed because of concerns that Woodruff's artistic approach would affect the theater's profitability.

Robert Woodruff was named a 2007 USA Biller Fellow by United States Artists, an arts advocacy foundation dedicated to the support and promotion of America's top living artists.

He is now on the faculty of the Yale School of Drama.
