= Evan Smith (playwright) =

American playwright

Evan Smith is an American playwright.

== Life ==
Smith was born in Savannah, Georgia. He attended Vassar College and received an MFA from the Yale School of Drama. His plays have been published by Grove Press and Dramatists Play Service.

== Awards ==
- 2002 Whiting Award

== Works ==
- Remedial English, Playwrights Horizons (1986).
- The Uneasy Chair, Playwrights Horizons (1998).
- Servicemen, The New Group (2001).
- Psych, Playwrights Horizons (2001).
- Daughters of Genius, 1812 Productions, Philadelphia (2006).
- Rich Boyfriend, The New Group (2008).
- The Savannah Disputation, Playwrights Horizons (2009).
