= Magic Theatre =

- Interactive map of Magic Theatre
- Address: 2 Marina Blvd. San Francisco, California; United States
- Coordinates: 37°48′24″N 122°25′52″W
- Events: American plays and playwrights

Construction
- Opened: 1967

Website
- magictheatre.org

The Magic Theatre is an American theatre company founded in 1967 and presently based at the historic Fort Mason Center on San Francisco's northern waterfront. The theatre is known for its focus on the development and production of new plays. Sean San José is the current artistic director.

== History ==
=== Founding ===
The Magic Theatre originated in 1967 when John Lion, a student of Jan Kott at the University of California, directed a production of Eugène Ionesco's The Lesson at the Steppenwolf Bar on San Pablo Avenue in Berkeley. The theatre's name came from a crucial location in Hermann Hesse's 1927 novel Steppenwolf: "Anarchist Evening at the Magic Theatre, For Madmen Only, Price of Admission Your Mind".

The theatre's first real success came with plays written by the Beat poet Michael McClure who sustained an eleven-year residency. The theatre reached a turning point when company members wanted to restructure it as a collective. Lion responded by moving the theatre across the bay to San Francisco, where it resided in a series of low-rent venues including another bar, the Rose and Thistle, at California Street and Polk Street.. In 1976, Lion learned of plans to convert a historic military base into an arts center with a view of Alcatraz and the Golden Gate Bridge. The idea was to change "swords into plowshares". The theatre became one of Fort Mason's first resident non-profit companies.

=== 1975 - 2000 ===
Sam Shepard began his long association with the Magic Theatre as playwright in residence in 1975. The theatre produced the world premiere productions of his Inacoma (1977), Buried Child (1978), Suicide in B-flat, True West (1980) directed by Robert Woodruff, Fool for Love (1983), and The Late Henry Moss (2000). Buried Child was awarded the 1979 Pulitzer Prize for drama. Shepard also developed collaborative pieces with the actor and director Joseph Chaikin. Other playwrights associated with the theatre include John O'Keefe, who staged many of his plays there including Shimmer.

In 1986, John Lion and the Magic Theatre received the Margo Jones Award, the highest honor given by the Dramatists Guild. The award cited the theatre's "significant contribution to the dramatic art through the production of new plays". Lion left the Magic Theatre in the late 1980s to teach, direct, and lecture. He died suddenly on August 1, 1999.

Larry Eilenberg became the artistic director in 1992 and was followed by Mame Hunt until 1998. Eilenberg resumed the position for five more seasons, during which time he premiered Charles L. Mee's Summertime and First Love and Moira Buffini's Silence. His Festival of Irish Women Playwrights resulted in the theatre offering the U.S. premiere of Marie Jones' Stones in His Pockets before its Broadway run.

=== 2000 - present ===
Loretta Greco was artistic director from 2008 to 2020. Prior to joining the Magic Theatre, she was the producing artistic director of the Women's Project in New York City. In her first season she used a viral fundraising campaign to recover from a financial crisis and keep the season going.

In late 2010, the Magic Theatre collaborated with the Marin Theatre Company and the American Conservatory Theater to put on "The Brother/Sister Plays", a set of plays by Tarell Alvin McCraney. The Magic Theatre performed The Brothers Size, which was directed by Octavio Solis and starred Tobie Windham, Joshua Elijah Reese, and Alex Ubokudom, with a set design by James Faerron. Among the other plays at the theatre in 2010 two were listed in the San Francisco Chronicle's top ten: Luis Alfaro's Oedipus el Rey and Liz Duffy Adams' Or.

In April 2021, Sean San José was appointed as artistic director.

== Actors ==
Actors who have performed at the Magic Theatre include Danny Glover, Peter Coyote, Kathy Baker, Ed Harris, John O'Keefe (also a playwright), the original cast of The Late Henry Moss, Nick Nolte, Sean Penn, Woody Harrelson, James Gammon and Cheech Marin.
