= The Wishing Well (song) =

""The Wishing Well""

Single by GOSH!
- B-side: "The Wishing Well Message"
- Released: November 1987
- Recorded: 1987
- Genre: Pop
- Songwriter(s): Chris Copping
- Producer(s): Keff McCulloch, Ray Santilli

"The Wishing Well" is a charity single released in 1987 to raise money for the redevelopment of Great Ormond Street Hospital via its (GOSH) Wishing Well appeal. The song featured an ensemble line-up of pop stars under the name GOSH! It reached No.22 in the UK Singles Chart in early 1988.

== Line-up ==
Lead vocals were provided by Boy George, Dollar, Grace Kennedy, Hazel O'Connor, Noddy Holder and Peter Cox. A number of celebrity guests were brought in to perform the chorus including Bonnie Langford, Sylvester McCoy, Jimmy Nail, Hollywood Beyond, Uriah Heep, Showaddywaddy, Andy Scott of The Sweet, Busta Jones, Hot Chocolate, EastEnders, Spitting Image, The Rent Party, Grange Hill, Caron Keating, Shriekback, Roland Rat, Andy Crane, Simon Potter, Lisa Maxwell, Michael Croft, Dave Joyner, Terry Rice-Milton, Tracey Wilson, Jodie Wilson, Patricia Conti, Cantabile, Housemaster Boyz, Jenny Day and Kevin O'Dowd.
