= A Lie of the Mind =

Play written by Sam Shepard

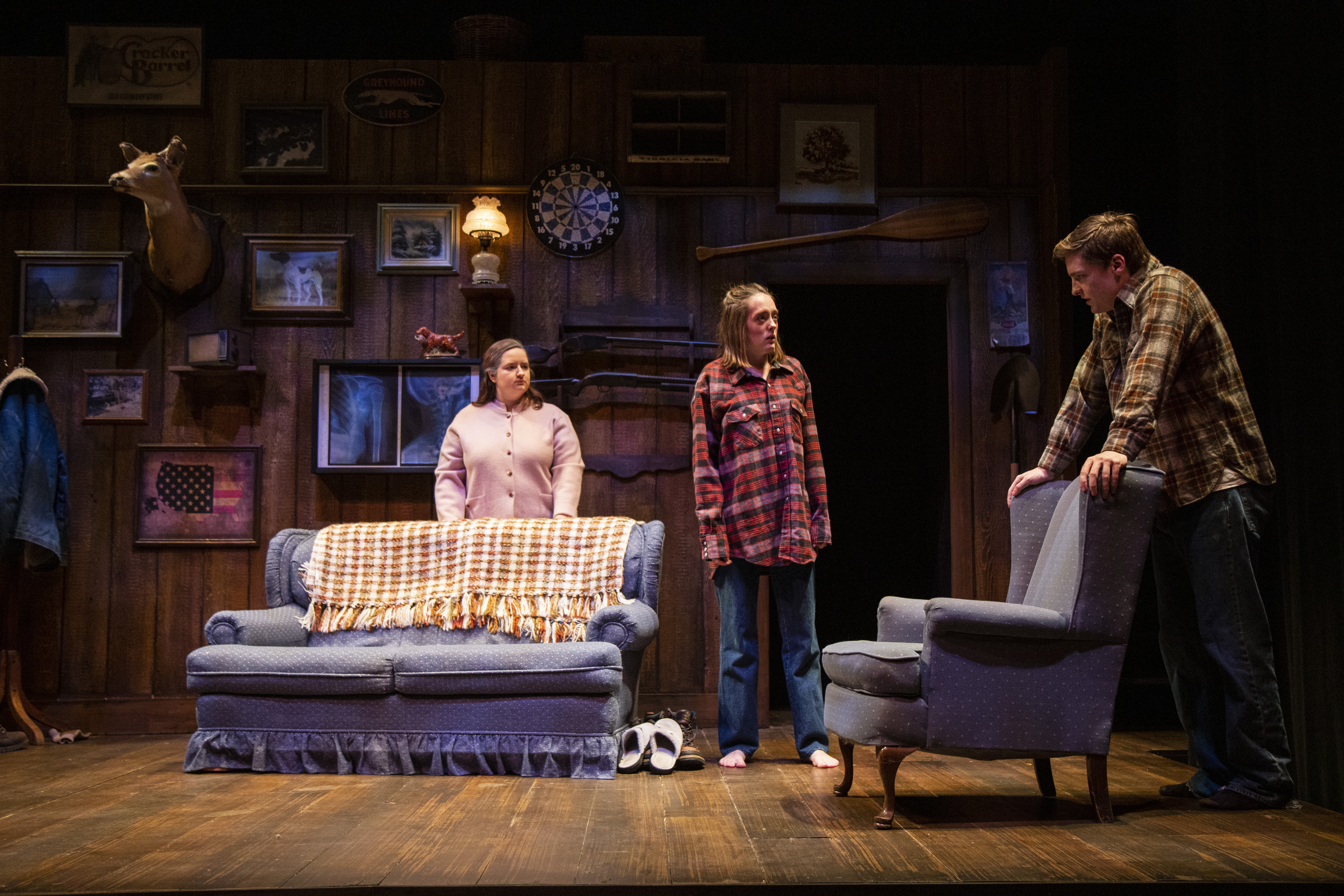
- A scene from the play.
- Written by: Sam Shepard
- Characters: Baylor; Jake; Lorraine; Mike; Beth; Frankie; Meg; Sally
- Original language: English
- Subject: Two families torn apart by tragedy
- Genre: Drama

Premiere
- Date premiered: December 5, 1985
- Place premiered: Promenade Theater; New York City, New York

A Lie of the Mind is a play written by Sam Shepard, first staged at the off-Broadway Promenade Theater on 5 December 1985. The play was directed by Shepard himself with stars Harvey Keitel as Jake, Amanda Plummer as Beth, Aidan Quinn as Frankie, Geraldine Page as Lorraine, and Will Patton as Mike. The music was composed and played by the North Carolina bluegrass group the Red Clay Ramblers.

Some critics consider the play the conclusion of a quintet that includes Shepard's Family Trilogy: Curse of the Starving Class (1976), Buried Child (1979), and True West (1980), plus Fool for Love (1983).

== Plot synopsis ==
Told in three acts set in Montana and California, the story alternates between two families after a severe incident of spousal abuse leaves all their lives altered until the final collision at an isolated cabin. The two families are linked by the marriage of Jake (son of Lorraine and brother of Sally and Frankie) and Beth (daughter of Baylor and Meg and sister of Mike). The play begins with Beth recuperating in her parents' home after a hospitalization resulting from Jake's abuse. Exploring family dysfunction and the nature of love, the play follows Jake as he searches for meaning after his relationship with Beth and her family as they struggle with Beth's brain damage.

== Production history ==
A Lie of the Mind was first produced Off-Broadway at the Promenade Theatre on December 5, 1985, closing on June 1, 1986 after 186 performances.

The cast was as follows:

- Baylor - James Gammon
- Jake - Harvey Keitel
- Lorraine - Geraldine Page
- Mike - Will Patton
- Beth - Amanda Plummer
- Frankie - Aidan Quinn
- Meg - Ann Wedgeworth
- Sally - Karen Young

=== Revival ===
The first major Off-Broadway revival of A Lie of the Mind was staged by the New Group at the Acorn Theatre. Ethan Hawke directed the production with an ensemble cast featuring Keith Carradine (Baylor), Josh Hamilton (Frankie), Marin Ireland (Beth), Laurie Metcalf (Meg), Alessandro Nivola (Jake), Maggie Siff (Sally), Frank Whaley (Mike), and Karen Young (Lorraine; Sally in the 1985 production). The show began previews on January 29, 2010, with a limited engagement from February 18 to March 20, 2010. It was nominated for five Lucille Lortel Awards including Outstanding Revival, and two Drama Desk Awards, including Outstanding Director of a Play. The cast was featured on The New Yorker's list of the Best Performers of 2010.

A revival in the UK was staged at the Southwark Playhouse in 2017, receiving excellent notices including 5 Stars from The Times of London.

A Chicago revival was staged at Raven Theatre in 2025, receiving excellent notices including a recommendation from the Chicago Tribune.

== Awards and nominations ==
- 1986 Drama Desk Award for Outstanding Play
- 1986 New York Drama Critics' Circle Award for Best Play
- 1986 Outer Critics Circle Award for Best Off-Broadway Play
- 2010 Lucille Lortel Awards for Outstanding Revival (nominee)
- 2010 Drama Desk Award, Outstanding Director of a Play, Ethan Hawke (nominee)
- 2010 Drama Desk Award, Outstanding Music in a Play, Gaines (nominee)
- 2010 Obie Award Performance, Laurie Metcalf (winner)
