= Buried Child =

1978 play by Sam Shepard

- Cover of Playbill for 1996 Broadway production
- Original language: English
- Written by: Sam Shepard
- Genre: Drama
- Setting: Illinois farmhouse, 1978

Premiere
- Date: June 27, 1978
- Place: Magic Theatre, San Francisco

Buried Child is a play written by Sam Shepard that was first presented in 1978. It won the 1979 Pulitzer Prize for Drama and launched Shepard to national fame as a playwright. The play depicts the fragmentation of the American nuclear family in a context of disappointment and disillusionment with American mythology and the American Dream, the 1970s rural economic slowdown, and the breakdown of traditional family structures and values. In 1979, Shepard also won the Obie Award for Playwriting. The Broadway production was nominated for five Tony Awards in 1996, including Best Play.

== Plot summary ==
=== Act I ===
In an old farmhouse on a failed plot of land in Illinois, the characters Dodge (in his 70s) and Halie (in her 60s), an old married couple, are introduced. The scene begins with the couple having a conversation with one another, discussing events of their past. Halie is not visible in the scene as she is yelling from upstairs, while Dodge is sitting on the basement sofa. He occasionally sneaks drinks from a bottle hidden in the couch; it is evident that he is an alcoholic. They talk about their beloved son Ansel, who was purportedly murdered years earlier by his wife on their wedding night. They also talk about another son, Bradley, an amputee who comes to cut Dodge's hair forcefully while he sleeps; Dodge is wearing a baseball cap to ward off this inevitability.

Halie leaves for church dressed in black and tells the oldest son, Tilden, to look after Dodge. Tilden then enters the scene with an armful of corn, which he claims grew in the field outside. Dodge states that nothing has grown in the field since the Dust Bowl, and accuses Tilden of stealing from a neighbor. Dodge and Tilden then begin to discuss Tilden's past; they speak of how he "got into trouble" in New Mexico, and how in failing his attempt to leave the family home for a new life, Tilden was forced to flee following this incident. Tilden is evidently mentally unwell as he sits, shucking corn into a bucket. When Dodge falls asleep at the end of their conversation, Tilden covers him with the corn husks, creating a blanket, before he goes outside into the rain. Bradley enters the room shortly after and shaves Dodge's head while he sleeps.

=== Act II ===
The scene begins with the introduction of Vince and Shelly. Vince was headed to meet his father Tilden in New Mexico but has decided to stop over at his grandparents' house on the way there; Shelly is just tagging along for the ride. Vince is surprised when he enters the house as Dodge does not recognize him at all. Shelly then believes they have entered the wrong house and tries to convince Vince to leave, but he does not budge. Tilden then enters the room with a bundle of carrots and is uninterested in Shelly and Vince. Vince then gets Tilden's attention, but Tilden also does not recognize Vince.

Vince tries different methods to convince Tilden and Dodge of his identity, while Shelly helps Tilden with the carrots. Dodge then motions to Vince and tells him to go buy him alcohol, and he does so. While he is gone, Shelly talks to Tilden and asks him questions about Vince. Tilden goes on saying that he does not recognize Vince but he does look familiar. Tilden also talks about a son he once had, whom Dodge killed and buried in the backyard. The text implies, though never states explicitly, that this child may have been conceived with Halie. Bradley then re-enters the scene and begins to harass Shelly by sticking his hand in her mouth. He then takes her fur coat and places it over Dodge and blacks out.

=== Act III ===
The scene begins with Dodge presuming that Vince has run away and left Shelly. He also tells Shelly not to fear Bradley as he only has one leg. After some time, Halie enters the house with Father Dewis, with whom, the audience later learns, she is having an affair. Halie sees Dodge lying on the ground and Bradley lying shamelessly on the sofa and smiles in embarrassment to Father Dewis. She then starts a yelling match with Dodge and Bradley, and they exchange several words until Shelly intervenes. In frustration, Shelly grabs Bradley's wooden leg and waves off the rest of the family, expressing her anger with them and Vince. Father Dewis tries to calm Shelly down and places the wooden leg onto the table.

Soon after, Vince returns drunk and hurls beer bottles at the house. He then climbs through the door's netting and states that he has to stay at the farmhouse with his family. Halie and Dodge then recognize Vince, and Dodge hands him the ownership of the house and land. With the land now his, Vince decides to stay at the house, while Shelly tries to convince him to leave. Shelly gives up on Vince and leaves, and Vince grabs the wooden leg and throws it outside the house; Bradley goes crawling for it. Father Dewis leaves the house and Halie heads upstairs to her room. Vince realizes that Dodge has died and places a blanket and rose on his body. Halie then begins to yell out that corn has bloomed in the backyard, while Vince sits motionless on the sofa. In the final scene, Tilden walks around the room with the corpse of a baby in his hands.

== Characters ==
- Dodge; an American farmer in his 70s
  - Aging dysfunctional patriarch of the family
  - Is an alcoholic
  - Is dying
  - Has been emasculated by his son and the infertility of his fields
  - Is ashamed of Halie's conceiving the child and is ashamed of killing it
  - Sits and watches television and drinks
- Halie; Dodge's wife in her mid-60s
  - The matriarch of the family
  - Nags Dodge
  - Some critics have interpreted her as having had an incestuous relationship with Tilden, accounting for the buried child, though this is not stated explicitly in the play; this original 1978 The New York Times review, for instance, describes the buried child simply as "an unwanted child" with no mention of incest.
  - Abandons the family to socialize with Father Dewis and revel in the past
  - Hero-worships the images of her lost son
- Tilden; their eldest son in his late 40s
  - Lost son, he has no purpose, no direction in his life
  - Some critics interpret his relationship with Halie as incestuous, accounting for the buried child's parentage
  - Is confused, ashamed, and embarrassed about the child and its death
  - Is bullied by the other characters
  - Brings crops into the house from the field in the backyard
- Bradley; their second son, an amputee, in his early 40s
  - Aggressive brother
  - Lost his leg in a chainsaw accident
  - Is emasculated by the removal of his leg
- Vince; Tilden's son, 22
  - Reclaims possession of the house
  - No one recognizes him when he arrives
- Shelly; Vince's girlfriend, 19
  - Reluctant to be at Vince's grandparents' house
  - Determined to uncover the family secret
  - Utterly shaken by what she finds
  - Skeptical of family relations
  - Traumatized
- Father Dewis; a Protestant minister in his 60s
  - Enjoys drinking and socializing with women
  - Carrying on a not-so secret affair with Halie

== Context and thematic concerns ==
=== Disappointment and disillusionment ===
- The character of Ansel; he is the son Halie idolizes as an All-American hero, despite his death due to suspicious circumstances in a motel room. Halie fantasizes about his potential to be a hero, an All-American star basketball player, reflecting the American hope in the youth. Yet his death and subsequent denouncement reflects the disappointment and disillusionment which many people experienced when they realize the actuality of the American circumstance.
- The two sons (Tilden and Bradley) both failed their parents' expectation. Both are expected to take over the farm or at least care for the parents in their old age, thus fulfilling the American mythology of the next generation taking over from the last. However both sons are handicapped – Tilden emotionally and Bradley physically. They are unable to care for their parents and thus unable to carry out the American Dream.
- Dodge felt the failure of the farm and the family as whole. He had failed to make the farm successful, he had not even planted any type of crop for over thirty years. He felt he had not lived up to what a typical American family's dream should have been. The play often shows the father as generally sitting around doing very little, steeped in a major depression.
- The character of Shelly is used to show the audience what the ideal family should be. Her disgust with what she expects and what is actually reality helps to show the audience what the American Dream should be.

=== 1970s economic slowdown ===
- The house itself is run down, reflecting the poverty of American farms.
- Nothing has been planted in the fields.

=== Breakdown of traditional family structures and values ===
- Dodge, the ineffectual patriarch, is meant to be the breadwinner and ethical guardian of the family. Instead, he takes on the role of a sardonic alcoholic who is bullied by his wife and children, and thus disempowered through their actions. His character reflects patriarchs in America who have failed to create the family environments idealized in the American Dream.
- The parentage of the buried child is left ambiguous by Shepard; some critics have interpreted the text as implying an incestuous relationship between Tilden and Halie, though this is never stated explicitly in the play. Contemporary reviews, including that of Richard Eder (Drama Critic, The New York Times, and a member of the 1979 Pulitzer Prize drama jury that awarded the play its prize), describe the buried child simply as "an unwanted child" without reference to incest. The murder of the child and the family's long concealment of it are nonetheless indicative of a breakdown in the ethical rigidity which characterizes the typical American family.
- The character of Father Dewis, adulterous and unauthoritative, fails to fulfill the role of moral guardian assigned to him by society, thus reflecting the breakdown of morality and ethics within America.

== Production ==
=== Shepard's intention ===
Shepard's intention was to create a narrative that communicated and reflected the frustrations of American people, but at the same time was engaging and entertaining. Set in a context which is easily recognizable, the American farming family, and centered around issues which are universal, the disillusionment with the American dream and the traditional patriarch, Buried Child reflects the frustrations of American people. The postmodern style that Shepard uses incorporates surrealism and symbolism in the realistic framework of a family drama. This platform allows for engaging visceral theatre. Shepard is able to create images in the imaginations of people through the use of surrealism and symbolism, evoke and harness the experiences of his audience through its postmodern nature, and keep the audience comfortable in the trappings of realism.

Some critics consider it part of a Family Trilogy, which includes Curse of the Starving Class (1976) and True West (1980). Others consider it part of a quintet that also includes Fool for Love (1983) and A Lie of the Mind (1985).

=== Style ===
Buried Child incorporates many postmodern elements such as the mixing of genres, the deconstruction of a grand narrative, and the use of pastiche and layering.

== Performance history ==
Buried Child premiered at the Magic Theatre in San Francisco on June 27, 1978, directed by Robert Woodruff. Its New York premiere was at Theater for the New City on October 19, 1978. Director Harold Clurman wrote in The Nation: "What strikes the ear and eye is comic, occasionally hilarious behavior and speech at which one laughs while remaining slightly puzzled and dismayed (if not resentful), and perhaps indefinably saddened. Yet there is a swing to it all, a vagrant freedom, a tattered song." The play transferred to Theatre de Lys, now the Lucille Lortel Theatre.

The show was revived for a two-month run on Broadway in 1996, following a production at the Steppenwolf Theatre in Chicago in 1995. The production, directed by Gary Sinise at the Brooks Atkinson Theatre, was nominated for five Tony Awards but did not win any. The script for the production had been reworked by Shepard. Shepard wrote that he had felt certain "aspects of the writing still seemed awkward and unfinished" in 1978, and that he was glad for the opportunity to revisit the script for the Steppenwolf production.

In February 2016, the play began performances Off-Broadway, produced by theatre company The New Group and directed by Scott Elliott. It ran for two months (February 2 through April 3, 2016) at The Pershing Square Signature Center. A live stream was held on March 30, 2016, on the fee-based service BroadwayHD. The production was nominated for two Lucille Lortel Awards, for Outstanding Lead Actor (Ed Harris) and Outstanding Featured Actor in a Play (Paul Sparks).

The New Group's production of Buried Child transferred to Trafalgar Studios in the West End for a 14-week run, beginning November 12, 2016.

=== Notable casts ===
Character	San Francisco (1978)	New York (1978)	Broadway (1996)	Off-Broadway (2016)	West End (2016)
Dodge	Joseph Gistirak	Richard Hamilton	James Gammon	Ed Harris	Ed Harris
Halie	Catherine Willis	Jacqueline Brookes	Lois Smith	Amy Madigan	Amy Madigan
Tilden	Dennis Ludlow	Tom Noonan	Terry Kinney	Paul Sparks	Barnaby Kay
Bradley	William M. Carr	Jay O. Sanders	Leo Burmester	Rich Sommer	Gary Shelford
Shelly	Betsy Scott	Mary McDonnell	Kellie Overbey	Taissa Farmiga	Charlotte Hope
Vince	Barry Lane	Christopher McCann	Jim True	Nat Wolff	Jeremy Irvine
Father Dewis	RJ Frank	Bill Wiley	Jim Mohr	Larry Pine	Jack Fortune

== Awards and nominations ==
=== Original Broadway production ===
Year	Award	Category	Nominee	Result
1996	Tony Award	Best Play		Nominated
1996	Tony Award	Best Featured Actor in a Play	James Gammon	Nominated
1996	Tony Award	Best Featured Actress in a Play	Lois Smith	Nominated
1996	Tony Award	Best Direction of a Play	Gary Sinise	Nominated
1996	Tony Award	Best Costume Design	Allison Reeds	Nominated
1996	Drama Desk Award	Outstanding Featured Actor in a Play	James Gammon	Nominated
