= Alien Autopsy (1995 film) =

1995 television film

VHS cover of Alien Autopsy: Fact or Fiction

Alien Autopsy: Fact or Fiction is a 1995 pseudo-documentary containing grainy black-and-white footage of a hoaxed alien autopsy. In 1995, film was released by British record producer Ray Santilli purporting to show an alien autopsy conducted shortly after the Roswell incident. The footage aired on television networks around the world. Fox television broadcast the purported autopsy, hosted by Jonathan Frakes, on August 28, 1995, under the title Alien Autopsy: Fact or Fiction, and re-broadcast it twice, each time to higher ratings. The footage was also broadcast on UK's Channel 4, and repackaged for the home video market. The program was an overnight sensation, with Time magazine declaring that the film had sparked a debate "with an intensity not lavished on any home movie since the Zapruder film".

The program was thoroughly debunked; the footage was shot on an inexpensive set constructed in a London living room. Its alien bodies were hollow plaster casts filled with offal, sheep brains, and raspberry jam. Multiple participants in Alien Autopsy stated that misleading editing had removed their opinions that the footage was a hoax. Santilli admitted in 2006 that the film was a fake, though he continued to claim it was inspired by genuine, but lost, footage.

== Production ==
On April 4, 2006, days before the release of the British feature film, Alien Autopsy, Sky broadcast a documentary, Eamonn Investigates: Alien Autopsy, presented by Eamonn Holmes. In this program, Ray Santilli and fellow producer Gary Shoefield admitted that they had created the 1995 footage.

Shoefield and Santilli had filmed a simulated autopsy on a fabricated alien, based upon what Santilli claimed to have seen in 1992. According to Santilli, a set was constructed in the living room of an empty flat in Rochester Square, Camden Town, London. John Humphreys, an artist and sculptor, was employed to construct two dummy alien bodies over three weeks. He filled plaster cast sculptures of alien bodies with raspberry jam, sheep brains, chicken entrails, and knuckle joints obtained from a butcher to serve as organs. Humphreys also played the role of the chief examiner, to allow him to control the effects being filmed. There were two separate attempts at making the footage. After filming, the team disposed of the "bodies" by cutting them into small pieces and placing them in rubbish bins across London.

Alien artifacts, supposedly items recovered from the crash site, were depicted in the footage. These included alien symbols and six-finger control panels, which Santilli describes as being the result of artistic license on his part. These artifacts were also created by Humphreys. The footage also showed a man reading a statement "verifying" his identity as the original cameraman and the source of the footage. Santilli and Shoefield admitted in the 2006 documentary that they had found an unidentified homeless man on the streets of Los Angeles, persuaded him to play the role of the cameraman, and filmed him in a motel.

== In popular culture ==
Alien Autopsy was derided in the media, and was the subject of numerous parodies. In 1995, The X-Files featured alien autopsy footage that the skeptical Agent Scully decries as "even hokier than the one they aired on the Fox network". It was satirized again in the 1996 X-Files episode "Jose Chung's From Outer Space". In "The Package", a 1996 Seinfeld episode, characters speculate the 1995 Alien Autopsy footage led to decreased media interest in the Bermuda Triangle. In 1998, Fox aired a new special, The World's Greatest Hoaxes and Secrets Revealed!, which debunked the 1995 footage. A fictionalized version of the creation of the footage and its release was retold in the comedy film Alien Autopsy (2006). Also released in 2016 was the British documentary History's Greatest Hoaxes: The Alien Autopsy.
