= Family Trilogy =

The Family Trilogy is a trio of plays by American playwright Sam Shepard. It includes Curse of the Starving Class (1976), Buried Child (1979), and True West (1980).

Journalist John O'Mahony called Shepard's trilogy "arguably his greatest achievement." Some critics consider the three plays part of a quintet which also includes Fool for Love (1983) and A Lie of the Mind (1985).
