= ESF Camps =

- Location: Pennsylvania, New York, New Jersey, Connecticut, Maryland and Florida
- Operated by: ESF Inc.
- Established: 1982

Education, Sports and Fun Camps (ESF) is a network of summer day camps. ESF operates 60+ different camps at 12 ESF Camp locations in Pennsylvania, New York, New Jersey, Connecticut, Maryland and Florida. ESF is described by Philadelphia Magazine as the "gold standard of summer day camps."

== History ==
ESF was founded by brothers Michael and Bill Rouse in 1982 as a two-week summer tennis camp at the Haverford School. Michael, who was 15 at the time, needed to raise $3,200 to play in the United States Tennis Association National Tournament.

In 2019, the Aspen Institute recognized ESF as a Project Play Champion at the institute's annual Project Play Summit.

== Activities ==
In total, ESF has more than 60 different camps at their 10 locations. They offer traditional day camp options such as Mini Camp, Day Camp, and Senior Camp which offer options including art, music, science and sports. However, ESF also has specialty camp options including Tennis Camp, Specialty Major Camps, SportsLab powered by Under Armour and Tech Camps.

ESF works with many organizations including the Philadelphia Zoo, the Franklin Institute, Cirque du Soleil and The Walt Disney Company for their camp programming. They also work with many sports teams including the Philadelphia Phillies, Philadelphia 76ers, Arsenal F.C., and Brooklyn Nets to offer specialty sports experiences.
