= John Coleman (musician) =

John A. Coleman (born 9 August 1934) is a British conductor and music arranger.

Coleman started his work as a conductor in 1968 in Val Guest's film Assignment K. He was music supervisor for the 1968 films The Strange Affair and Negatives, and went on to become musical director for The Les Dawson Show (1979). Coleman has conducted the United Kingdom entries for the Eurovision Song Contest on five occasions: 1980, 1981, 1983, 1984 and 1985.

== Filmography ==
- Catch Us If You Can (1965)
- The Dark Crystal (1982)
- Savage Islands (1983)
- Best Revenge (1984)
- East Is East (1999)
- Shrek (2001)
- Rat Race (2001)
- All or Nothing (2002)
- Mrs Henderson Presents (2005)
- United 93 (2006)
- Kung Fu Panda (2008)
