= List of plays with anti-war themes =

An anti-war play is a play that is perceived as having an anti-war theme.

Some plays that are thought of as anti-war plays are:

- Peace (421 BC) - by Aristophanes
- The Trojan Women (415 BC) - Euripides
- Lysistrata (411 BC) - Aristophanes
- Journey's End (1928) - R. C. Sherriff
- The Silver Tassie (1929) - Seán O'Casey
- The Rumour by C.K.Munro 1929 at the Royal Court Theatre produced by Hilda Dallas
- Post-Mortem (1930) - Noël Coward
- For Services Rendered (1932) - Somerset Maugham
- The Trojan War Will Not Take Place (1935) - Jean Giraudoux
- Bury the Dead (1936) - Irwin Shaw
- Idiot's Delight (1936) - Robert E. Sherwood
- Hooray for What! (1937)
- The White Disease (1937) - Karel Čapek
- The Mother (1938) - Karel Čapek
- Mother Courage and Her Children (1939) - Bertolt Brecht
- Schweik in the Second World War (1943) - Bertolt Brecht
- Nemesis (1944) - Nurul Momen
- All My Sons (1947) - Arthur Miller
- Andha Yug (1954) - Dharamvir Bharati
- The Hostage (1958) - Brendan Behan
- Oh, What a Lovely War! (1961) - Charles Chilton
- US (1966) - collaboration
- Viet Rock (1966) - rock musical by Megan Terry
- Hair: The American Tribal Love-Rock Musical (1967) - Book and Lyrics by Gerome Ragni and James Rado, music by Galt MacDermot
- Botticelli (1968) - Terrence McNally
- Bringing It All Back Home (1969) - Terrence McNally
- The Watering Place (1969) - Lyle Kessler
- The Night Thoreau Spent in Jail (1969) - Robert E. Lee & Jerome Lawrence
- G. R. Point (1977) - David Berry
- Wilhelm Reich in Hell (1987) - Robert Anton Wilson
- No-No Boy (2010) - Ken Narasaki

== See also ==
- List of anti-war songs
- List of anti-war films
- List of books with anti-war themes
- List of peace activists
