= Botticelli (disambiguation) =

Botticelli most often refers to:

- Sandro Botticelli, Italian painter of the Early Renaissance

Botticelli may also refer to:

== People ==
Botticelli is a surname of Italian origin:

- Michael Botticelli (figure skater), American figure skater
- Michael Botticelli (politician), US

== Other uses ==
- Botticelli (game), a guessing game about famous people
- Botticelli (play), by Terrence McNally
- Botticelli (crater), a crater on Mercury
- Botticelli's Venus, a painting by Sandro Botticelli
- The Botticellis, a US band

== See also ==
- Botticella, an Italian surname, as in Domenico Botticella
