= Bringing It All Back Home (play) =

- Written by: Terrence McNally
- Characters: Sam - father Mona - mother Jimmy - son killed in war Johnny - younger son Suzy - daughter Ms. Fatima - TV reporter television support crew casket delivery people
- Subject: antiwar
- Genre: Drama
- Setting: United States, Viet Nam war era

Premiere
- Date premiered: 1969
- Place premiered: New Haven

Bringing It All Back Home is a one-act play by Terrence McNally. It is a biting satire of a middle-class family and their reaction to losing a son in Vietnam.

== Productions ==
The play was produced in New Haven in 1969 and at the Provincetown Playhouse, New York City, 1971.

It was produced by Solid Hang at the Collective Unconscious, New York, in September 2005.

== Concept ==
This play is one of several of McNally's that dealt with the Vietnam and Iraq wars: Botticelli (1968), Witness (1968), and Some Men (2007). Peter Wolfe (professor of English at the University of Missouri-St. Louis) notes that Bringing It All Back Home is an anti-war play, and also examines the family.

== Plot ==
The father of the household makes obscene phone calls while his teen son and daughter fight about the illegal drugs at their high school; the mother blots it all out. Then the body of their son Jimmy, killed in the Vietnam war, arrives. A television station wants to film their reactions. Jimmy arises and wonders why he died.
