= List of Vincent Price works =

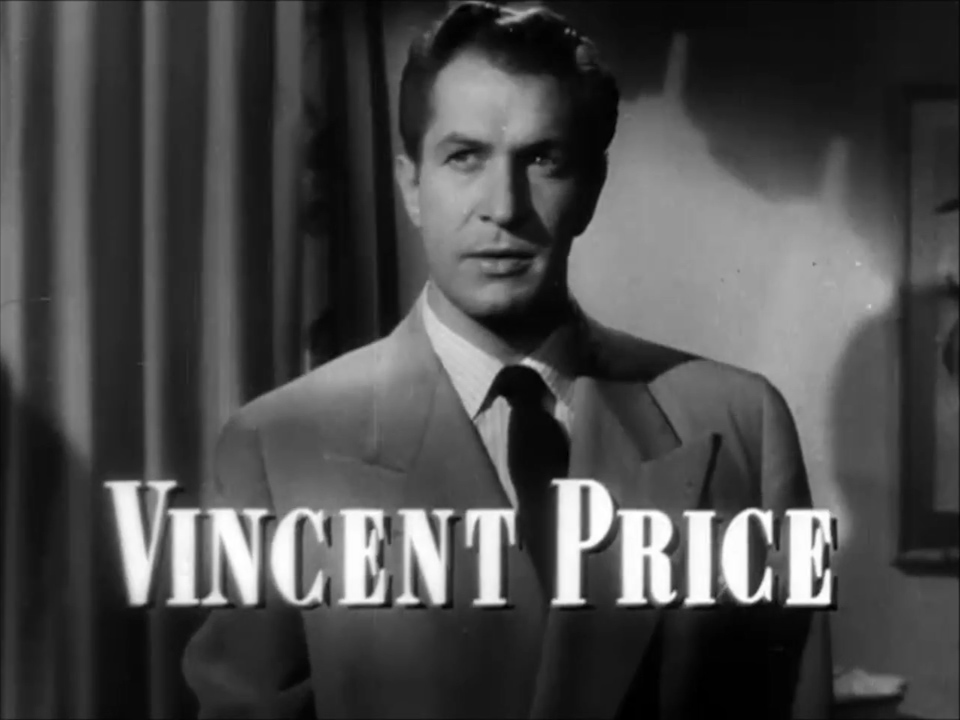
Vincent Price in the trailer for Laura (1944)

This is the filmography of Vincent Price (May 27, 1911 – October 25, 1993), which includes appearances in theatre and television. Price made his theatre debut in the Gate Theatre's production of Chicago (1935), followed by work on Broadway. Under contract to Universal Pictures, Price traveled to Hollywood, making his screen debut in Service de Luxe (1938). By the 1960s, Vincent Price was working almost exclusively in the horror genre and teen film genres. Price died in Los Angeles, California, in 1993.

== Film ==
Year	Film	Role	Director	Notes
1938	Service de Luxe	Robert Wade	Rowland V. Lee	
1939	The Private Lives of Elizabeth and Essex	Sir Walter Raleigh	Michael Curtiz	
1939	Tower of London	Duke of Clarence	Rowland V. Lee	
1940	The Invisible Man Returns	Geoffrey Radcliffe	Joe May	
1940	Green Hell	David Richardson	James Whale	
1940	The House of the Seven Gables	Clifford Pyncheon	Joe May	
1940	Brigham Young	Joseph Smith	Henry Hathaway	
1941	Hudson's Bay	King Charles II	Irving Pichel	
1943	The Song of Bernadette	Prosecutor Vital Dutour	Henry King	
1944	The Eve of St. Mark	Pvt. Francis Marion	John M. Stahl	
1944	Wilson	William Gibbs McAdoo	Henry King	
1944	Laura	Shelby Carpenter	Otto Preminger	
1944	The Keys of the Kingdom	Angus Mealey	John M. Stahl	
1945	A Royal Scandal	Marquis de Fleury	Ernst Lubitsch; Otto Preminger	
1945	Leave Her to Heaven	Russell Quinton	John M. Stahl	
1946	Shock	Dr. Richard Cross	Alfred L. Werker	
1946	Dragonwyck	Nicholas Van Ryn	Joseph L. Mankiewicz	
1947	The Web	Andrew Colby	Michael Gordon	
1947	The Long Night	Maximilian	Anatole Litvak	
1947	Moss Rose	Police Inspector R. Clinner	Gregory Ratoff	
1948	Up in Central Park	Boss Tweed	William A. Seiter	
1948	Abbott and Costello Meet Frankenstein	The Invisible Man	Charles Barton	Uncredited voice
1948	Rogues' Regiment	Mark Van Ratten	Robert Florey	
1948	The Three Musketeers	Richelieu	George Sidney	
1949	The Bribe	Carwood	Robert Z. Leonard	
1949	Bagdad	Pasha Ali Nadim	Charles Lamont	
1950	The Baron of Arizona	James Reavis	Samuel Fuller	
1950	Champagne for Caesar	Burnbridge Waters	Richard Whorf	
1950	Curtain Call at Cactus Creek	Tracy Holland	Charles Lamont	
1951	Adventures of Captain Fabian	George Brissac	William Marshall	
1951	His Kind of Woman	Mark Cardigan	John Farrow	
1951	Pictura: An Adventure in Art	Narrator	Various	
1952	The Las Vegas Story	Lloyd Rollins	Robert Stevenson	
1953	House of Wax	Professor Henry Jarrod	Andre de Toth	
1954	Dangerous Mission	Paul Adams	Louis King	
1954	Born in Freedom: The Story of Colonel Drake	Colonel Edwin L. Drake	Arthur Pierson	
1954	Casanova's Big Night	Casanova	Norman Z. McLeod	Uncredited
1954	The Mad Magician	Don Gallico	John Brahm	
1955	Son of Sinbad	Omar Khayyam	Ted Tetzlaff	
1956	Serenade	Charles Winthrop	Anthony Mann	
1956	While the City Sleeps	Walter Kyne	Fritz Lang	
1956	The Vagabond King	Narrator	Michael Curtiz	Uncredited voice
1956	The Ten Commandments	Baka	Cecil B. DeMille	
1957	The Story of Mankind	The Devil	Irwin Allen	
1958	The Fly	François Delambre	Kurt Neumann	
1959	House on Haunted Hill	Frederick Loren	William Castle	
1959	Return of the Fly	François Delambre	Edward Bernds	
1959	The Big Circus	Hans Hagenfeld	Joseph M. Newman	
1959	The Tingler	Dr. Warren Chapin	William Castle	
1959	The Bat	Dr. Malcolm Wells	Crane Wilbur	
1960	House of Usher	Roderick Usher	Roger Corman	
1961	Master of the World	Robur	William Witney	
1961	Pit and the Pendulum	Nicholas Medina, Sebastian Medina	Roger Corman	
1961	Queen of the Nile	Benakon	Fernando Cerchio	also known as Nefertiti, Queen of the Nile
1961	Rage of the Buccaneers	Romero	Mario Costa	
1962	Confessions of an Opium Eater	Gilbert De Quincey	Albert Zugsmith	
1962	Tales of Terror	Locke, Fortunato Luchresi, Ernest Valdemar	Roger Corman	
1962	Convicts 4	Carl Carmer	Millard Kaufman	
1962	Tower of London	Richard of Gloucester	Roger Corman	
1963	The Raven	Dr. Erasmus Craven	Roger Corman	
1963	Diary of a Madman	Magistrate Simon Cordier	Reginald LeBorg	
1963	Beach Party	Big Daddy	William Asher	
1963	The Haunted Palace	Joseph Curwen; Charles Dexter Ward	Roger Corman	
1963	Twice-Told Tales	Alex Medbourne; Giacomo Rappaccini; Gerald Pyncheon	Sidney Salkow	
1964	The Comedy of Terrors	Waldo Trumbull	Jacques Tourneur	
1964	The Last Man on Earth	Dr. Robert Morgan	Sidney Salkow, Ubaldo Ragona	
1964	The Masque of the Red Death	Prince Prospero	Roger Corman	
1965	The Tomb of Ligeia	Verden Fell	Roger Corman	
1965	War-Gods of the Deep	Sir Hugh, The Captain	Jacques Tourneur	
1965	Dr. Goldfoot and the Bikini Machine	Dr. Goldfoot	Norman Taurog	
1966	Dr. Goldfoot and the Girl Bombs	Dr. Goldfoot; General Willis	Mario Bava	
1967	The House of 1,000 Dolls	Felix Manderville	Jeremy Summers	
1967	The Jackals	Oupa Decker	Robert D. Webb	
1968	Witchfinder General (U.S. title Conqueror Worm)	Matthew Hopkins	Michael Reeves	
1968	Spirits of the Dead	Narrator	Federico Fellini, Louis Malle, Roger Vadim	English version, uncredited
1969	More Dead Than Alive	Dan Ruffalo	Robert Sparr	
1969	The Trouble with Girls	Mr. Morality	Peter Tewksbury	
1969	The Oblong Box	Sir Julian Markham	Gordon Hessler	
1970	Scream and Scream Again	Dr. Browning	Gordon Hessler	
1970	An Evening of Edgar Allan Poe	Narrator	Kenneth Johnson	
1970	Cry of the Banshee	Lord Edward Whitman	Gordon Hessler	
1970	Cucumber Castle	Wicked Count Voxville	Hugh Gladwish	
1971	Here Comes Peter Cottontail	January Q. Irontail	Jules Bass, Arthur Rankin Jr.	Voice
1971	The Abominable Dr. Phibes	Dr. Anton Phibes	Robert Fuest	
1971	Mooch Goes to Hollywood	Himself	Richard Erdman	
1971	What's a Nice Girl Like You...?	William Spevin	Jerry Paris	
1972	Dr. Phibes Rises Again	Dr. Anton Phibes	Robert Fuest	
1973	Theatre of Blood	Edward Lionheart	Douglas Hickox	
1974	Madhouse	Paul Toombes	Jim Clark	
1974	Percy's Progress	Stavos Mammonian	Ralph Thomas	
1975	Journey Into Fear	Dervos	Daniel Mann	
1975	Welcome to My Nightmare	The Curator	David Winters	Voice
1976	The Butterfly Ball	Narrator	Tony Klinger	Voice
1979	Scavenger Hunt	Milton Parker	Michael Schultz	
1980	The Sorcerer's Apprentice	Narrator	Peter Sander	Voice
1980	I Go Pogo	Deacon Mushrat	Marc Paul Chinoy	Voice
1981	The Monster Club	Eramus	Roy Ward Baker	
1981	Freddie the Freeloader's Christmas Dinner	Professor Humperdo	John Trent	
1982	Vincent	Narrator	Tim Burton	Voice; short film; Partial inspiration for plot
1982	Fun with Mr. Future	Mad Scientist	Darrell Van Citters	Voice
1983	House of the Long Shadows	Lionel Grisbane	Pete Walker	
1983	Michael Jackson's Thriller	Narrator	John Landis	Voice; Music video
1984	Bloodbath at the House of Death	Sinister Man	Ray Cameron	
1986	The Great Mouse Detective	Professor Ratigan	Burny Mattinson, Ron Clements, David Michener, John Musker	Voice
1987	The Nativity	King Herod	Don Lusk	Voice
1987	From a Whisper to a Scream	Julian White	Jeff Burr	
1987	The Whales of August	Mr. Maranov	Lindsay Anderson	
1987	Sparky's Magic Piano	Henry, Sparky's dad	Lee Mishkin	Voice
1988	Dead Heat	Arthur P. Loudermilk	Mark Goldblatt	
1990	Catchfire	Mr. Avoca	Dennis Hopper	
1990	Edward Scissorhands	The Inventor	Tim Burton	
1993	The Thief and the Cobbler	Zig-Zag, the Grand Vizier	Richard Williams	Voice (recorded in 1972); Final role

== Television ==
Year	Title	Role	Notes
1949	The Christmas Carol	Narrator (voice)	Television special
1952	Robert Montgomery Presents	Peter Hammond	Episode "The Ringmaster"
1953	Summer Theatre	Cooper Fielding	Episode: "Dream Job"
1953	The Plymouth Playhouse	Cooper Fielding	Episode: "Dream Job"
1955	Climax!	Gideon Rone	Episode "Night of Execution"
1955	Crossroads	Reverend Robert Russell	Episode "Cleanup"
1955	TV Reader's Digest	John Hayes	Episode "The Brainwashing of John Hayes"
1956	Science Fiction Theatre	Dr. Philip Redmond	Episode "Operation Flypaper"
1956	Science Fiction Theatre	Gary Williams	Episode "One Thousand Eyes"
1956	Crossroads	Reverend Alfred Price	Episode "God's Healing"
1956–1971	The Red Skelton Hour	Claude Casserole, Dr. Nelson Jr., Dr. Flygrabber, various characters	17 episodes
1957	Alfred Hitchcock Presents	Charles Courtney	Episode "The Perfect Crime"
1957	Collector's Item: The Left Fist of David	Henry Prentiss	Television film
1958	Have Gun – Will Travel	Charles Mathews / Othello	Episode "The Moor's Revenge"
1959	Riverboat	Otto Justin	Episode "Witness No Evil"
1960	The Red Skelton Hour	Gilbert	Episode: "The Original DaVinci"
1960	The Red Skelton Hour	Maxwell the Magician	Episode "Deadeye and the Magician"
1964–1966	The Danny Kaye Show	Gangster, Dr. Frankenstein, The Dentist, The Prime Minister, Art Collector and Critic, The snotty Maitre'd	4 episodes
1965	The Man from U.N.C.L.E.	Victor Marton	Episode "The Foxes and Hounds Affair"
1966–1967	Batman	Edgar Heed / Egghead	7 episodes
1967	F Troop	Count Sfoza	Episode "V is for Vampire"
1967	Voyage to the Bottom of the Sea	Professor Multiple	Episode "The Deadly Dolls"
1968–1971	Rowan & Martin's Laugh-In	Guest Performer	5 episodes
1969	Daniel Boone	Dr. Thaddeus Morton	Episode "Copperhead Izzy"
1969	The Good Guys	Mr. Middleton	Episode "Fly in My Stew"
1969	Get Smart	Dr. Jarvis Pym	Episode "Is This Trip Necessary?"
1970	Mod Squad	John Wells / Wentworth	Episode "A Time of Hyacinths"
1970	Here's Lucy	Himself	Episode "Lucy Cuts Vincent's Price"
1971	What's a Nice Girl Like You...?	William Spevin	Television film
1971	The Hilarious House of Frightenstein	Himself	130 episodes
1971	The Pet Set	Himself	2 episodes
1971	Curiosity Shop	Himself/Master of Scaremonies	Episode “Where Do You Go to Get Out of a Scare?”
1971–1972	Night Gallery	Professor, John	2 episodes
1972	The Jimmy Stewart Show	Himself	Episode "Price Is Right"
1972	The Brady Bunch	Professor Hubert Whitehead	2 episodes
1972–1975	The Carol Burnett Show	Guest Performer	4 episodes
1973	Columbo	David Lang	Episode "Lovely but Lethal"
1974	The Snoop Sisters	Michael Bastion	Episode "A Black Day for Bluebeard"
1974	Mooch	Himself	Television film
1976	Ellery Queen	Michael Raynor	Episode "The Adventure of the Sinister Scenario"
1976	The Bionic Woman	Manfred / Cyrus Carstairs	Episode "Black Magic"
1977	The Muppet Show	Himself	1 episode
1977	The Brady Bunch Hour	Himself	1 episode
1978	The Love Boat	The Amazing Alonzo	Episode "Ship of Ghouls"
1979	Time Express	Jason Winters	4 episodes
1979	CBS Library	Narrator	Episode "Once Upon a Midnight Scary"
1981	Red Skelton's Christmas Dinner	Professor Humperdo	Television special
1983	Hansel and Gretel	Host	Television film
1983	Ruddigore	Sir Despard Murgatroyd	Television film
1984	Faerie Tale Theatre	Magic Mirror, Narrator	2 episodes
1985	The 13 Ghosts of Scooby-Doo	Vincent Van Ghoul (voice)	13 episodes; Likeness
1986	The Greatest Adventure: Stories from the Bible	King Herod (voice)	Episode "The Nativity"
1986	Blacke's Magic	Emeric Valdemar	Episode "Wax Poetic"
1986	Escapes	Host / The Mailman	Television film
1987	The Little Troll Prince	King Ulvik #1 (voice)	Television film
1988	Ghost Ship	Narrator (voice)	Television film, English dub
1991	Tiny Toon Adventures	Edgar Allan Poe (voice)	Episode "How Sweetie It Is"
1992	The Heart of Justice	Reggie Shaw	Television film

== Radio ==
Year	Title	Episode/source
1946	Suspense	"The Name of the Beast"
1946	Lux Radio Theatre	Dragonwyck
1946	Hollywood Star Time	The Song of Bernadette
1947	The Saint	July 9, 1947 to June 30, 1948
1973	The Price of Fear	Episode 1 to 22
1977	Aliens in the Mind	BBC Radio 4

== Theatre ==
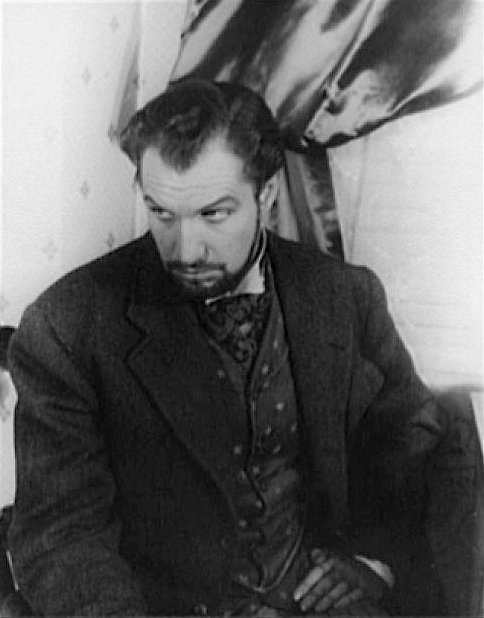
Vincent Price, appearing on Broadway as Mr. Manningham in Angel Street; a role he would portray for three years, between 1941 and 1944.

Year	Title	Role	Venue	Run
1935	Chicago	Charles Murdock	Gate Theatre	March 13, 1935 – unknown
1935	Victoria Regina	Prince Albert	Gate Theatre	May 1935 – unknown
1935	Victoria Regina	Prince Albert	Broadhurst Theatre	December 26, 1935 – June 1936
1935	Victoria Regina	Prince Albert	Broadhurst Theatre	August 31, 1936 – June 1937
1937	The Lady Has A Heart	Jean	Longacre Theatre	September 25, 1937 – December 1937
1938	The Shoemaker's Holiday	Master Hammon	Mercury Theatre	January 1, 1938 – unknown
1938	The Shoemaker's Holiday	Master Hammon	National Theatre	February 1, 1938 – unknown
1938	Heartbreak House	Hector Hushabye	Mercury Theatre	April 29, 1938 – June 1938
1938	Outward Bound	Rev. William Duke	Playhouse Theatre	December 22, 1938 – July 22, 1939
1941	Angel Street	Mr. Manningham	John Golden Theatre	5 December 1941 – September 30, 1942
1941	Angel Street	Mr. Manningham	Bijou Theatre	October 2, 1942 – December 30, 1944
1942	Yours, A. Lincoln	Abraham Lincoln	Shubert Theatre	July 9, 1942 – July 12, 1942
1953	Richard III	Duke of Buckingham	City Center of Music and Drama	December 9, 1953 – December 20, 1953
1954	Black-Eyed Susan	Dr. Nicholas Marsh	Playhouse Theatre	December 23, 1954 – December 25, 1954
1968	Darling of the Day	Priam Farll	George Abbott Theatre	January 27, 1968 – February 24, 1968
1978	Diversions and Delights	Oscar Wilde	Eugene O'Neill Theatre	April 12, 1978 – April 22, 1978

== Discography ==
Year	Release	Notes
1956	Poems of Shelley	Audiobook
1958	Co-Star – The Record Acting Game	Audiobook
1958	Sounds of freedom: Patrick Henry to William Jennings Bryan	Narrated speech "Henry Clay: on The War of 1812; January 8, 1813"
1961	America The Beautiful - The heart of America in poetry	Audiobook
1962	The World Of Century Twenty First	Audiobook
1962	Gallery	Presenter
1968	Darling Of The Day	Audiobook
1969	Witchcraft - Magic: An Adventure In Demonology	Audiobook
1972	Tales Of Witches, Ghosts And Goblins	Audiobook
1973	A Coven Of Witches' Tales	Audiobook
1973	His Son: The life and times of Jesus	Audiobook
1974	A Graveyard Of Ghost Tales	Audiobook
1975	The Complete Horror Classic "Blood Bath"	Audiobook
1975	The Gold-Bug	Audiobook
1975	Edgar Allan Poe: The imp of the perverse and other tales	Audiobook
1975	Odyssey, starring Vincent Price	Audiobook
1976	A hornbook for witches, stories and poems for Halloween	Audiobook
1977	Dining at Versailles	Audiobook
1977	The bard's board / Food from Shakespearean times	Audiobook
1977	The Monster Mash / The Bard's Own Recipe	45 Single
1977	Classical Spanish cuisine	Audiobook

== Books ==
- Price, Vincent, I Like What I Know – A Visual Autobiography. Garden City, New York: Doubleday, 1959.
- Price, Vincent, The book of Joe; about a dog and his man. Doubleday, 1961; OCLC 1292943
- Price, Vincent and Price, Mary Grant, A Treasury of Great Recipes. Bernard Geis Associates, 1965; ISBN 1121111130.
- Price, Vincent and Price, Mary Grant, Mary and Vincent Price Present A National Treasury of Cookery. Heirloom Publishing Company, 1967; OCLC 1450485
- Price, Vincent and Price, Mary Grant, Come Into the Kitchen Cook Book: A Collector's Treasury of America's Great Recipes. Stravon Educational Press, 1969; ISBN 0873960203
- Price, Vincent, Cooking Price-wise with Vincent Price. Corgi Children's, 1971; ISBN 0552086657
- Price, Vincent, The Vincent Price Treasury of American Art. Waukesha, Wisconsin: Country Beautiful Corporation, 1972; ISBN 978-08-7294031-4.
- Price, Vincent, Vincent Price: His Movies, His Plays, His Life. Doubleday & Co, 1978; ISBN 0385115946
- Price, Vincent and Price, V. B., Monsters. Grosset & Dunlap, 1981; ISBN 0448143054
