= Sweet Eros =

1968 play by Terrence McNally

Sweet Eros is a one-act, two-character play by Terrence McNally, which premiered Off-Broadway in 1968.

== Productions ==
Sweet Eros opened Off-Broadway at the Gramercy Arts Theatre on November 21, 1968, on a double bill with another McNally play, Witness. The two plays closed on January 26, 1969. Directed by Larry Arrick, the cast starred Sally Kirkland as "The Girl" and Robert Drivas as the "Young Man" (to whom McNally dedicated the work).

=== Regional and international ===
Some U.S. productions of Sweet Eros (as of 2008) have been produced:

- Washington, D.C., by Source Theatre Company and Yellow Taxi Productions (Feb.-March 2004), directed by Dominic A. D'Andrea, featuring Justin Benoit and MaryBeth Fritzky
- Madison, Wisconsin, by Mercury Players Theatre (MercLab) (July 2006), directed by Cara Peterson and featuring Kelly Lee Kriesel and R. Peter Hunt
- Austin, Texas, by Tongue and Groove Theatre (Sept. 2006), directed by David Yeakle and featuring Mark Stewart and Hilah Johnson
- Tucson, Arizona, by Live Theatre Workshop (May 2008), directed by Danielle Dryer and featuring Miranda McBride and Christopher Johnson

A May 2005 revival in Brisbane, Queensland, Australia, was staged by and featured Robert Braiden and Veronica Smith.

== Plot ==
A disturbed young man, soured by two failed romantic relationships, has kidnapped a young woman (a complete stranger) and taken her to his home in the country. As the play opens, the woman is seated in a chair, bound and gagged, the man sitting opposite, observing her. The man explains to the woman his reasons for kidnapping her, saying he had long fantasized about doing such a thing to a young woman. He methodically strips his captive naked, presumably rapes her, then proceeds to subject her to an ongoing series of rants, ruminations and reflections on life and love as he seeks to force the woman to understand him – and, ultimately, to submit to him.

== Nudity ==
Sweet Eros caused a sensation when it first opened in New York because its female star, Sally Kirkland, was nude for nearly the entire length of the play, which lasts approximately 45 minutes. Because of this play, Kirkland has claimed to be the first actress to perform completely naked in legitimate New York theatre, but this claim is undercut by the fact that the rock musical Hair, with its notorious group nude scene, had opened on Broadway seven months earlier.

According to an article in the Daytona Beach Morning Journal, "The event was duly noted as the first completely nude role."
