= Pictura: An Adventure in Art =

Pictura
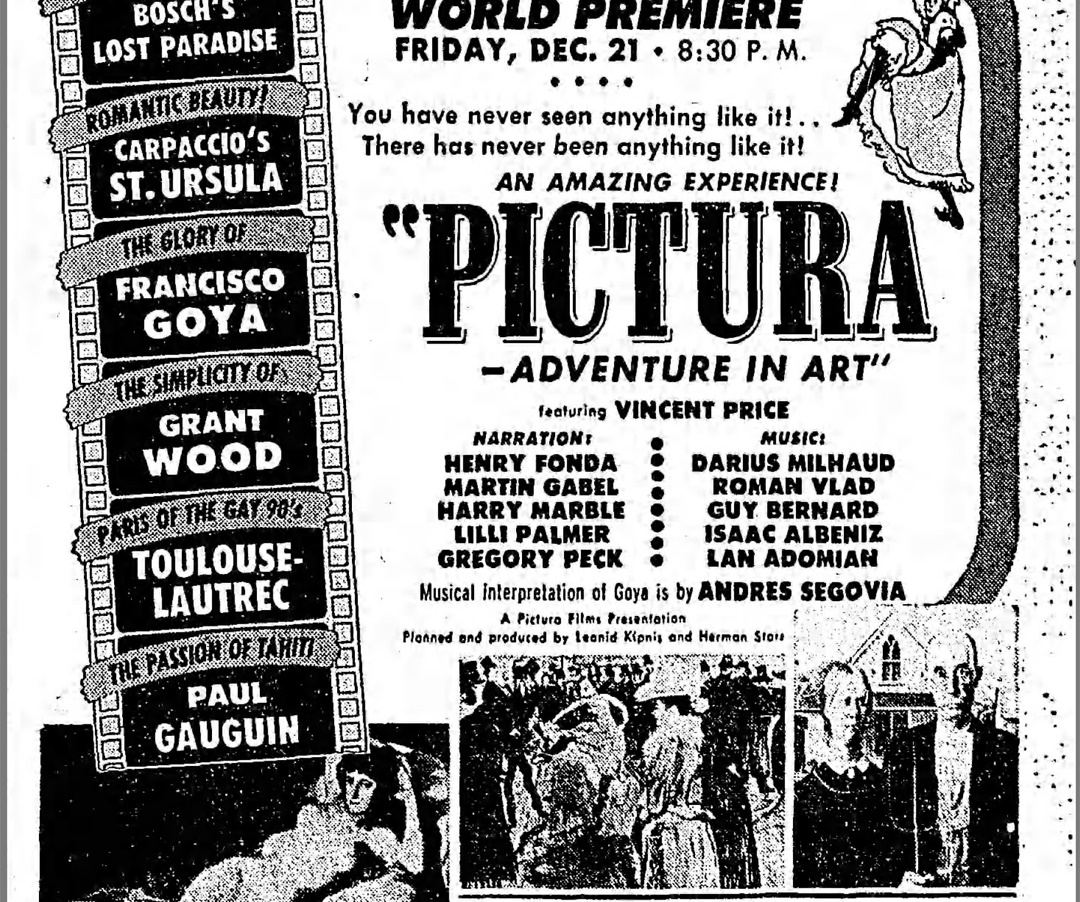
- Directed by: E. A. Dupont; Luciano Emmer; Enrico Gras; Alain Resnais; Robert Hessens; Marc Sorkin; Olga Lipska; Lauro Venturi
- Written by: Frederick Kohner; Gaston Diehl; Richard Nickson; George Davis
- Produced by: Leonid Kipnis; Herman Starr; Sergio Amidei; Pierre Braunberger
- Starring: Vincent Price; Gregory Peck; Henry Fonda; Martin Gabel; Lilli Palmer; Harry Marble
- Cinematography: Ernest Haller
- Edited by: Chester Schaeffer; Reine Dorian; Robert S. Robinson; Marc Sorkin
- Music by: Darius Milhaud; Guy Bernard; Roman Vlad; Lan Adomian
- Distributed by: The Pictura Company
- Release dates: 21 December 1951; 7 April 1952 (NYC)
- Running time: 80 min.
- Country: United States

Pictura: An Adventure in Art (1951) is a documentary film directed by seven directors, and narrated by several famous Hollywood actors, including Vincent Price, Gregory Peck, Henry Fonda, Martin Gabel, and Lilli Palmer.

The film attempts to give the general filmgoing public a taste of art history and art appreciation. The film won a Special Award at the Golden Globes in 1952.

== List of segments ==
- Prologue: Segment showing Vincent Price talking to art students, directed by E. A. Dupont
- Part 1: The Lost Paradise by Hieronymus Bosch (1450–1516). Research and Story, Luciano Emmer, Enrico Gras; Producer, Luciano Emmer; Director, Luciano Emmer; Commentary, King James Version of the Old Testament; Music, Roman Vlad; Played by the Santa Cecilia Academy Rome Orchestra; Narrator, Vincent Price
- Part 2: The Legend of St. Ursula by Vittore Carpaccio (1460–1526). Director, Luciano Emmer; Co-Producer, Sergio Amidei; Special Camerawork and Effects, Mario Bava; Screenplay, Richard Nickson; Music, Roman Vlad; Played by the Orchestra of Santa Cecilia Academy in Rome; Conducted by Willy Ferrero; Narrator, Gregory Peck
- Part 3: Francisco Goya (1746–1828). Producer, Luciano Emmer; Director, Lauro Venturi; Screenplay, Harry Marble; Music, Isaac Albeniz; Guitar, Andrés Segovia; Narrator, Harry Marble
- Part 4: Henri de Toulouse-Lautrec (1863–1901). Directors, Robert Hessens, Olga Lipska; Producer, Pierre Braunberger; Screenplay, Herman Starr; Music, Guy Bernard; Narrator, Lilli Palmer
- Part 5: Paul Gauguin (1848–1903). Director, Alain Resnais; Producer, Pierre Braunberger; Research, Gaston Diehl; Music, Darius Milhaud; Narrator, Martin Gabel
- Part 6: Grant Wood (1892–1942). Director, Marc Sorkin; Producer, Leonid Kipnis; Research, Jules Schwerin; Camera, John Lewis; Music, Lan Adomian; Musical Direction, Jack Shaindlin; Narrator, Henry Fonda

== Tagline ==
- "A strange and exciting voyage."

== See also ==
- Vincent Price filmography
