= Whiskey (play) =

Play by Terrence McNally

Whiskey is a one-act play by Terrence McNally.

== Production history ==
Whiskey premiered Off-Broadway at Theater at Saint Clements's Church on April 29, 1973, and closed on May 6, 1973. Directed by Kevin O'Connor, it starred Tom Rosqui (as I. W. Harper), Charlotte Rae (as Tia Maria), Beeson Carroll (as Johnny Walker), Susan Browning (as Southern Comfort), Michael Sacks (as Jack Daniels) and Shelley Mitchell (as Whiskey). Alan Eichler was the press representative.

In his introduction, McNally writes: "The play is a comedy. There are sad things in it, too. I don't think you will have trouble separating the two. And remember, it ends happily."

== Plot ==
One of many McNally plays to explore his Texas roots, the play is set in Houston, and involves a cowboy troupe called the Lush Thrushes, the five members of a TV show, all named after iconic American liquors, and their performing horse Whiskey. The character's names are I. W. Harper, Tia Maria, Johnny Walker, Southern Comfort, and Jack Daniels. All five characters are drunk throughout the play and end up burning to death in a hotel fire. Only the bad-tempered horse Whiskey survives. In an epilogue we see the five dead cowboys and cowgirls in heaven, all dressed in white, still drinking, and bemoaning the fact that Whiskey will now have the show all to himself.

== Reception and legacy ==
The initial production was short-lived. LGBT activist Vito Russo walked out of a performance in response to what he saw as anti-gay content "put to no constructive use". On the other hand, in 1975 Meryl Streep used a scene from the play as a text for one of her earliest successful auditions after she came to New York from Yale School of Drama.

Mel Gussow, in his review for The New York Times, wrote that "McNally satirizes in bold colors, as in a cartoon strip... At times 'Whiskey' seems as inconsequential as the subject it is mocking... he is a shrewd critic of human nature and a cleaver indicter of a country captivated by television."

Peter Wolfe notes that McNally introduces the characters "in terms redolent of George Bernard Shaw, interpreting their conduct while describing them physically but avoiding Shaw's philosophical treatises and jokes."
