= And Things That Go Bump in the Night =

- Written by: Terrence McNally
- Characters: Lakme; Sigfrid; Ruby; Grandfa; Fa; Clarence
- Subject: fear, relationships, and family structure
- Genre: Drama
- Setting: A room below ground level

Premiere
- Date premiered: April 26, 1965
- Place premiered: Royale Theatre; New York City, New York

And Things That Go Bump in the Night is a play by Terrence McNally. It premiered on February 4, 1964, at the Guthrie Theater in Minneapolis and ran on Broadway in 1965 for 16 performances. McNally was awarded a Rockefeller Foundation grant to write this play.

== Background ==
McNally received a Rockefeller Foundation grant, and wrote And Things That Go Bump in the Night. McNally had the understanding that the play would receive a public performance at the Guthrie Theater in Minneapolis. However, the University of Minnesota said that, in a misunderstanding, "the project did not necessarily involve production or public performance" according to Donald Smith, Assistant Vice President for Academic Administration. McNally planned on presenting the play for "himself and the director, Lawrence Kornfeld" from February 3 through February 6. The University of Minnesota did finally permit the production to take place with an invited audience in February 1964.

== Plot summary ==
The play depicts a vaguely apocalyptic and futuristic family transformed by fear, living in their basement, and treating each other with suspicion, threats, and contempt. Family loyalty has been destroyed and everyone engages in dark and disturbing games. The mother Ruby, a faded opera diva, is egotistical and manipulative. Thirteen-year-old daughter Lakme engages in malicious sibling rivalry with her brother Sigfrid, charming but unfeeling. The father Fa spends most of his time sleeping in his chair ignoring the chaos around him. Into this mix a friend named Clarence visits for the evening. Since Clarence is hopeful and idealistic, the family feels compelled to destroy him. Clarence fights a losing battle against the culture of fear surrounding him aided sometimes by crotchety Grandfa who remembers when the family was not ruled by fear.

== Production ==
And Things That Go Bump in the Night premiered on Broadway on April 26, 1965, at the Royale Theatre. Directed by Michael Cacoyannis, the cast starred Susan Anspach (Lakme), Robert Drivas (Sigfrid), Eileen Heckart (Ruby), Clifton James (Fa), Ferdi Hoffman (Grandfa) and Marco St. John (Clarence). The play closed on May 8, 1965, after 16 performances and six previews.

== Critical reception ==
And Things That Go Bump in the Night was the first McNally play to be produced at a legitimate theater. The Broadway production opened to generally negative reviews. One review said, "It would have been better if Terrence McNally's parents smothered him in his cradle." McNally recalls, "Actually, two reviews of my first play mentioned my death." Nevertheless, the production ran to sold-out houses for three weeks after the producer lowered the price of tickets to one and two dollars.

Before it was over twenty thousand people saw the play in New York. Moreover, the play garnered enough favorable notice for McNally to receive a Guggenheim Fellowship in 1966. A second review in the Village Voice was generally favorable, as quoted in the Samuel French acting edition: "…the most impressive new American play I have seen this season…" by the Village Voice.
