= The Mother (Čapek play) =

1938 play written by Karel Čapek

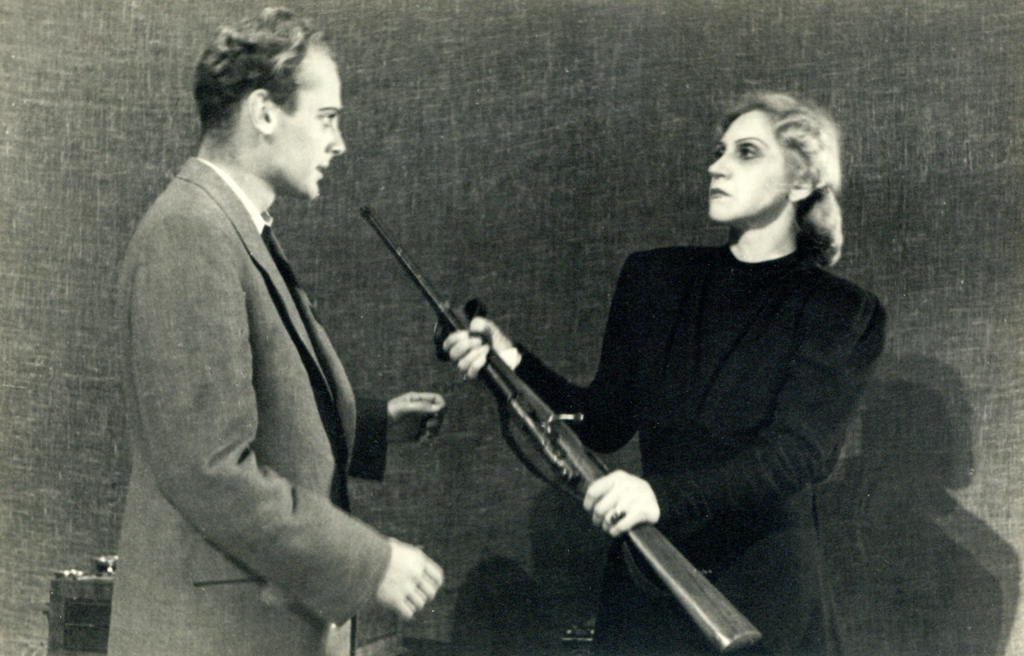
The play by the Ljubljana Drama Theatre in 1945

The Mother (Matka in Czech) is an anti-war drama written by Czech novelist and playwright Karel Čapek, in 1938. The play is influenced by the Spanish Civil War and portrays the difficult relationship between men who wanted to fight, and their mothers and loved ones who did not want them to go. It also shows the fight against fascism, and the emotional turmoil and suffering that war brings. The play emphasizes the unnecessary difficulties of war and the complex relationships during war, emphasizing that although wars are bad, sometimes we have no choice but to fight them to protect our freedom.

== Synopsis ==
Heavily influenced by the Spanish Civil War, the play portrays Dolores, a mother and a wife, and her feelings as she slowly loses her husband and sons to war. The entire play is set in the house living room, which is full of ornamental pieces of war such as sabers, pistols, rifles, and monuments of colonial expeditions such as spears and shields, more closely resembling a museum than a family living room. The mother, Dolores, can communicate with her dead husband Richard, who died in what she considered a pointless battle against the natives in distant Africa, along with her son Ondra. Dolores talks with Richard the moment he dies, and Richard attempts to justify his death and insists he died in honor and duty, and in turn Dolores complains about his leaving of her and her five children. Suddenly after the communication, Andrew the oldest son and physician appears in the room (also dead) and tells his mother that he had lost his life in Africa attempting to cure yellow fever, and apologizes for his death in the progress of medicine. Her son George then appears in the room (dead) and greets his father and brothers to tell his desperate mother that he had died attempting to break the altitude record. At this moment, the news on the radio announce that the civil war in the country is growing more intense. Her sons Peter and Kornel are actively participating in this war, and later on, the two of them suddenly appear in the room to announce that both of them had died. Peter had died when he was arrested and executed by the Whites (White Terror), and Kornel was shot during a street battle.

During the third and final scene, the mother struggles to let her last son go, Tony, but the radio comes on and announces that the enemy had bombed a children's school and killed innocent children; following this Dolores gives her son Tony a weapon and ends the play with the word "Go!"

== See also ==
- List of plays with anti-war themes
