= G. R. Point =

G. R. Point is a play about the Vietnam War by the American playwright and Vietnam war veteran David Berry.

The G.R. in the title stands for "Graves Registration", with the play focusing on soldiers whose task it is to package the dead in black plastic bags for shipment back to the United States.

G. R. Point, Berry's first play, won an Obie Award for Distinguished Playwriting and a Drama Desk Nomination for Best New American Play in 1977.

== See also ==
- List of plays with anti-war themes
