= The Whales of August (play) =

1980 American play

- Original language: English
- Written by: David Berry
- Characters: Libby, age 86; Sarah, age 75; Tisha, age 78; Maranov, age 79; Joshua, age 80
- Subject: Drama
- Setting: August 1954, Maine

Premiere
- Date: 1980
- Place: Center Stage Baltimore

The Whales of August is a play written by American playwright David Berry. The play is about two elderly sisters, both widows, who are living together in 1954 in a summer cottage in Maine. The older sister, Elizabeth "Libby" is being taken care of by her younger sister, Sarah. The sisters sit on their porch and watch the whales in the ocean and discuss the trials and tribulations of their lives. The play was adapted as a feature-film, and released in 1987.

== Production history ==
Berry first started writing the play in 1978 through a grant by the National Endowment for the Arts Creative Writing Fellowship, and it premiered in Baltimore at the Center Stage theatre in April 1980, where it was a part of their First Stage series. The play was next staged in 1981 by the Trinity Repertory Company in Providence, Rhode Island.

After receiving good notices, the play was moved to New York City and staged in 1982 at the WPA Theatre, Off-Broadway. The casts for these stagings were all different except for veteran actress Vivienne Shub in the role of Tisha. The play made its Chicago debut at the Victory Gardens Theater in 1983.

The play is dedicated to David Berry's grandfather, William Finlay Adams (1886–1977). The play is available for licensing by regional theatre groups. In 2014, an all Japanese cast performed the play at the Art Tower Mito.

== Historical casting ==
Character	1980 Center Stage cast	1981 Trinity Rep cast	1982 WPA Theatre cast	1987 film cast
Elizabeth Mae "Libby" Logan-Strong	Kate Wilkinson	Ruth Maynard	Elizabeth Council	Bette Davis
Sarah Louise Logan-Webber	Margaret Thomson	Sylvia Davis	Bettie Endrizzi	Lillian Gish
Letitia "Tisha" Benson-Doughty	Vivienne Shub	Vivienne Shub	Vivienne Shub	Ann Sothern

== Adaptations and awards ==
The play was adapted as a film of the same name and released in 1987. The producer of the film saw the Trinity Rep production, and purchased the rights as a vehicle for Lillian Gish. Berry also wrote the screenplay for the film, which received mixed reviews, with positive recognition for the performances. Ann Sothern was nominated for the Academy Award for Best Supporting Actress.
