= Tower of London (1939 film) =

1939 film by Rowland V. Lee

- Theatrical release poster
- Directed by: Rowland V. Lee
- Screenplay by: Robert N. Lee
- Produced by: Rowland V. Lee
- Starring: Basil Rathbone; Boris Karloff; Barbara O'Neil; Ian Hunter; Vincent Price; Nan Grey
- Cinematography: George Robinson
- Edited by: Edward Curtiss
- Music by: Charles Previn
- Production company: Universal Pictures
- Distributed by: Universal Pictures
- Release date: 17 November 1939
- Running time: 92 minutes
- Country: United States
- Language: English

Tower of London is a 1939 black-and-white historical film directed and produced by Rowland V. Lee. It stars Basil Rathbone as the future King Richard III of England, and Boris Karloff as his fictitious club-footed executioner Mord. The film is based on the traditional depiction of Richard rising to become King of England in 1483 by eliminating everyone ahead of him. Each time Richard accomplishes a murder, he removes one figurine from a dollhouse resembling a throneroom. Once he has completed his task, he now needs to defeat the exiled Henry Tudor to retain the throne.

Tower of London was developed years before production began when Rowland V. Lee travelled to the United Kingdom to do research for a historical film and came up with the idea of developing a film about Richard III. Pressure was put on Lee to direct the film on time and on budget as his last two pictures had gone over budget and were not completed on schedule. Lee had problems when filming two battle scenes in the film which involved 400 extras when all their costumes were damaged by the studio rain machine. Production went over-budget and led to Lee making a deal with Universal to complete all scenes with the higher costing cast members early to finish the film.

== Plot ==
In the 15th century Richard Duke of Gloucester, aided by his clubfooted executioner Mord, eliminates those ahead of him in the line of succession to the throne, then occupied by his brother King Edward IV of England. As each murder is accomplished, Richard takes particular delight in removing small figurines, each resembling one of the successors, from a throne-room dollhouse, until he alone remains.

After the death of Edward, Richard is the heir to the Crown of England and consequently becomes Richard III, King of England. Richard needs only to defeat the exiled Henry Tudor to retain power.

== Cast ==
- Basil Rathbone as Richard, Duke of Gloucester
- Boris Karloff as Mord
- Barbara O'Neil as Queen Elyzabeth
- Ian Hunter as King Edward IV
- Vincent Price as Duke of Clarence
- Nan Grey as Lady Alice Barton
- Ernest Cossart as Tom Clink
- John Sutton as John Wyatt
- Leo G. Carroll as Lord Hastings
- Miles Mander as King Henry VI
- Lionel Belmore as Beacon
- Rose Hobart as Anne Neville
- Ronald Sinclair as Boy King Edward
- John Herbert-Bond as Young Prince Richard
- Ralph Forbes as Henry Tudor
- Frances Robinson as Duchess Isobel
- G. P. Huntley as Wales
- Rodion Rathbone as Lord DeVere
- Walter Tetley as Chimney Sweep
- Donnie Dunagan as Baby Prince

== Production ==
=== Pre-production ===
Tower of London was originally conceived years before production when the producer and director Rowland V. Lee travelled to England to do research for an epic that involved British history. Lee's brother, Richard N. Lee then came up with the idea of developing a film about Richard III of England, with Richard later explaining that "we agreed that we wanted to use the roughest, most hard-boiled period of all time, Row was for the Stuart era but I held out for the time of Richard". Rowland V. Lee presented the idea to Universal Pictures and The Hollywood Reporter announced in June 1939 that production was in plans to start. The studio gave the film a $500,000 budget with a 36-day shooting schedule that started on August 11.

Trade papers stated on July 27 that Brian Donlevy was being tested for the lead role of Richard III with George Sanders being signed to the role one week later. Neither casting turned out when Lee approached Basil Rathbone for the role. Rathbone had previously worked with Lee on The Sun Never Sets and Love from a Stranger. Rathbone was pre-occupied by filming Rio at the time but was able to split his time between both productions during the first week of production. The role of Mord the Executioner was made for Boris Karloff who had signed on to the studio for two additional features after Son of Frankenstein. Initially, his character was to have a full black beard but this concept was removed in favour of a nearly hairless look.

=== Filming ===
Art director Jack Otterson developed a recreation of the tower in the studios backlot which involved consulting historical records and original blueprints of the 13th-century building. The completed structure stood 75 feet high and would later be re-used in other Universal Studios productions.

The staging of historic battles at Bosworth and Tewkesbury led to a call for over 300 extras on August 19 and required the production to travel 20 miles north of Hollywood to a ranch in Tarzana. Strong winds caused problems with the fog machines used, making it impossible to film. Lee had the crew move on to film the Battle of Tewkesbury scenes, which involved rain machines that made the extras' cardboard helmets fall apart. The assistant director of the film stated in his film diary that "a group of unruly, uncoooperative and destructive extras dressed in helmets and armor made this one of the most unsuccessful days the studio had with a large crowd of people in many year". Lee attempted to shoot battle footage again on August 22 and tried to film small groups of actors against process plates of previously shot battle scenes.

As Lee's last two films for Universal exceeded their original budget, pressure was placed on Lee to cut some costs on Tower of London. Universal told Lee to remove the child marriage scene, which Lee fought against. The studio and Lee eventually agreed to finish all scenes with the higher-salaried actors, starting with Karloff. Production completed on Tower of London on September 4. The budget was exceeded by nearly $80,000. Ford Beebe signed on to complete a few remaining shots.

=== Film score ===
For the score of the film Hans J. Salter used authentic period music for incidental music. When a preview screening for the film was shown in early November 1939, studio heads at Universal demanded new music written, but due to a lack of time, music from Frank Skinner's Son of Frankenstein was used, including a slightly altered title theme.

== Release ==
Tower of London was distributed theatrically by Universal Pictures on 17 November 1939. The film inspired a remake in 1962 with United Artists signing Roger Corman to direct Tower of London, with Vincent Price, Clarence in the 1939 film, now playing Richard III.

This film, along with Night Key, The Climax, The Strange Door and The Black Castle, was released on DVD in 2006 by Universal Studios as part of The Boris Karloff Collection. It was released in high definition on Blu-ray as part of Scream Factory's Universal Horror Collection Volume 3 in December 2019.

== Reception ==
From contemporary reviews, The Hollywood Reporter stated that Rowland V. Lee "has turned in probably the finest effort in his career. He has executed the difficult feat of making this type of picture human personal, building powerfully to his climaxes, injecting curiously apt touches of humor, crowning the effort with the power, spectacular battle scenes". A reviewer in Time found the film "less authentic than its elaborately spooky reproductions of London's Tower...But the battles of Tewkesbury and Bosworth set a new high for realistic racket than should deafen the most demanding". Variety wrote that the film "so strong that it may provide disturbing nightmares as aftermath" and that "Rathbone provides a most vivid portrayal of the ambitious Duke". Frank Nugent of The New York Times found the film "all too painful and pointless" noting that "Karloff can't be taken seriously" and that "even the Rialto's audience, which no one dare accuse of hypsersensitivy, grew silent after a while and stopped applauding Mr. Rathbone's villainies. He was almost too bad to be true".

When actors and crew involved in the picture later discussed the film, Vincent Price commented that he "saw it again only recently and found it ponderous but interesting. The drinking match was all ad-libbed and had to be done in very few shots to heighten credibility. We shot it all in one day". Assistant editor Paul Landres stated that "we thought we had an Academy Award picture, we really did. Each scene was remarkable. [...] And then we saw the first cut and, man, that picture died. And the reason it died was that every scene came up to its peak, and there was nothing but peaks in the whole film. There was no pacing, there was no change. Boy, did I learn. I really learned from that one".

From retrospective reviews, Hans J. Wollstein of AllMovie said that "Karloff employs all kinds of instruments of torture, but very little actual torture is shown" and found that "with the likes of Karloff, Basil Rathbone, and a very young Vincent Price taking turns chewing the scenery, it is also vastly entertaining" as well as that "the battle scenes are so much more intimate and thus interesting for Universal's lack of elaborate staging".

== See also ==
- Boris Karloff filmography
- Vincent Price filmography
- List of historical drama films
- Politics in fiction
