= The Whales of August =

1987 film by Lindsay Anderson

- Theatrical release poster
- Directed by: Lindsay Anderson
- Screenplay by: David Berry
- Based on: The Whales of August (1980 play) by David Berry
- Produced by: Carolyn Pfeiffer; Mike Kaplan
- Starring: Bette Davis; Lillian Gish; Vincent Price; Ann Sothern
- Cinematography: Mike Fash
- Edited by: Nicolas Gaster
- Music by: Alan Price
- Production company: Nelson Entertainment
- Distributed by: Alive Films
- Release date: October 16, 1987
- Running time: 90 minutes
- Country: United States
- Language: English
- Budget: $3 million
- Box office: $1.3 million

The Whales of August is a 1987 American drama film directed by Lindsay Anderson and adapted by David Berry from his play of the same title. It stars Bette Davis and Lillian Gish as elderly sisters living on the Maine coast. The cast also features Vincent Price and Ann Sothern. It was the final film appearance for both Gish (who was 93 years old at the time of filming) and Sothern, and the second-to-last appearance of Davis.

The film was released by Alive Films on October 16, 1987. It received mixed-to-positive reviews from critics, although the performances of the cast were universally praised. Gish won the National Board of Review Award for Best Actress, and Sothern earned a Best Supporting Actress nomination at the 60th Academy Awards. The film was also nominated for three Independent Spirit Awards.

== Plot ==
Libby and Sarah Logan are two elderly, widowed sisters from Philadelphia. Near the end of their lives, they spend their annual summer in a seaside house in Maine. Their surroundings cause them to recall their relationship as young women, and the summers they had enjoyed there in the past. They reflect on the passage of time, and the bitterness, jealousies and misunderstandings that slowly festered over the years and kept them from establishing a true closeness in their relationship.

Libby is the more infirm of the two sisters, and her nature has become bitter and cold as a result. Sarah is a softer and more tolerant character, intent on nursing her sister through her discomfort and trying to breach the gulf that has grown between them. The resentment that Libby so clearly displays to her stifles Sarah's every attempt at making a friendly overture toward her, and Sarah cautiously retreats.

Nicholas Maranov is an expatriate from Russia who comes to visit the sisters and who has recently lost the friend with whom he had been living. Tisha is a vivacious lifelong friend who provides common sense, fun and laughter and is the catalyst for some of the sisters' conversations and revelations.

== Cast ==
- Bette Davis as Elizabeth Mae "Libby" Logan-Strong
  - Margaret Ladd as young Libby
- Lillian Gish as Sarah Louise Logan-Webber
  - Mary Steenburgen as young Sarah
- Vincent Price as Nicholas Maranov
- Ann Sothern as Letitia "Tisha" Benson-Doughty
  - Tisha Sterling as young Tisha. Sterling is Sothern's real-life daughter.
- Harry Carey Jr. as Joshua Brackett, handyman
- Frank Grimes as Mr. Beckwith, real estate agent
- Frank Pitkin as Old Randall
- Mike Bush as Young Randall

== Production ==
The film's producer, Mike Kaplan, saw the play performed by the Trinity Repertory Company while he was visiting Rhode Island on family business. Kaplan, who had met Gish many years earlier when he was a publicist involved in The Comedians (1967), decided immediately that the role of Sarah Webber was a role that would introduce new generations of filmgoers to the great talent of the "First Lady of American Film", who had begun her film career 75 years earlier, in 1912. This was to be the final film role for the 93-year-old Gish; she died in 1993 at the age of 99. It was also to be Sothern's final acting role.

As opposed to the original stage production, the film made it possible to showcase stars who were the age peers of the characters. Actors and actresses of the appropriate age and stature were contacted to see whether they were both interested in and physically capable of playing the roles. Many screen greats were approached to play a role but demurred because they suffered from various infirmities, including Shirley Booth, Barbara Stanwyck, Fred Astaire and Paul Henreid. Gish and Davis were both infirm: Davis had recently recovered from several strokes which inhibited movement on the left side of her body, and Gish was somewhat hard of hearing. Other greats turned down the producers' overtures for other reasons, including Joel McCrea, Frances Dee, Katharine Hepburn and John Gielgud. Gielgud initially accepted the role and even attended early rehearsals but was replaced by Vincent Price before filming began. Even Davis and Gish turned down the parts more than once before being persuaded to star in the film.

This film marks a reunion between Davis and Price after 48 years, having last appeared on screen together in The Private Lives of Elizabeth and Essex in 1939.

Gish and Davis did not get along during the filming. Davis demanded top billing on the picture, of which Gish said, "Oh dear, I just can't deal with that sort of thing. I don't care what they do with my name. If they leave it off, so much the better. It's the work I love, not the glory." Davis got leftmost billing, which was considered optimal, with Gish's name slightly higher. Gish recalled that Davis rarely spoke to her or looked at her except when the script required. Though Gish was hurt, she was sympathetic due to Davis's illness. "That face! Have you ever seen such a tragic face? Poor woman! How she must be suffering! I don't think it's right to judge a person like that. We must bear and forbear." For her part, Davis was frustrated with Gish's missing her cues: "Miss Gish was stone deaf. She couldn’t have heard the cues if I’d shouted them through a bullhorn." However, Gish admitted she actually had little trouble hearing her cues, but invented a subtle version of the silent treatment due to Davis's mistreatment of her. When Davis spoke a line, Gish often would look puzzled and gently protest: "I just can't hear what she's saying." Whereupon, while Davis sat seething, Anderson would repeat Davis's line in a ringing voice, and Gish would instantly pick up her cue and continue the scene.

David Berry (the screenwriter), Lindsay Anderson (the director), the cinematographer, a location scout, and Kaplan traveled by water taxi to several islands in Casco Bay searching for a location that would provide the necessary ambiance and ocean vistas for the film. In the end, the film was shot on Cliff Island, a few miles from the site of Berry's family cottage on Peaks Island, where, in fact, the characters and story were drawn.

== Release ==
The film's premiere in New York City on October 14, 1987, was followed a few weeks later by a premiere in Portland, Maine, which was attended by both Berry and Kaplan.

== Reception ==
Reviews for The Whales of August were mixed to positive. The plot and script were seen as underwhelming, with its major redeeming quality being the performances of Gish, Davis and Sothern. On Rotten Tomatoes out of 11 critics, 64% of them gave the film a positive review, with an average score of 6.63 out of 10. Roger Ebert of the Chicago Sun-Times gave the film 3 out of 4 stars.

Vincent Canby of The New York Times said in his review, "Lindsay Anderson's Whales of August is a cinema event, though small in scale and commonplace in detail. It's as moving for all the history it recalls as for anything that happens on the screen. Yet what happens on the screen is not to be underrated.

Although the film starred two preeminent actresses in what was close to their final film roles, it was not a substantial commercial success domestically. Upon its release, it was widely tipped that either Davis or Gish would be rewarded, if not for their performances in this film then for their longevity, with Academy Award nominations, but neither actress was nominated. As it turned out, the one Academy Award nomination for the film went to Sothern (in her final film performance) for Best Supporting Actress, her first and only nomination of her lengthy career. Gish received the National Board of Review Award for Best Actress. The film received three Independent Spirit Award nominations: Best Female Lead (Gish), Best Supporting Male (Price) and Best Supporting Female (Sothern). Anderson was nominated for the Critics Award at the Deauville Film Festival.

The film was screened out of competition at the 1987 Cannes Film Festival, which Gish attended, and where she was given a 10-minute standing ovation.

Japanese filmmaker Akira Kurosawa cited The Whales of August as one of his favorite films.

== See also ==
- Lillian Gish filmography
- List of Vincent Price works
- Bette Davis filmography
