= Botticelli (game) =

Guessing game

Botticelli is a guessing game where one person or team thinks of a famous person and reveals the initial letter of their name, and then answers yes–no questions to allow other players to guess the identity. It requires the players to have a good knowledge of biographical details of famous people.

The game takes its name from the principle that the famous person must be at least as famous as Sandro Botticelli.

== How to play ==
One player (the chooser) is selected to think of a famous person (the identity). This person should be someone the chooser is comfortable answering biographical questions about, and someone the chooser is very confident that the other players will all have heard of; obscure identities make for frustrating game play, especially with young players. The rule of thumb is that the person should be at least as famous or well known as Sandro Botticelli, hence the name of the game. Fictional characters are acceptable, but can present certain difficulties. In some contexts, a non-famous person with whom all the players are familiar may be acceptable.

The chooser then announces the initial letter of the name by which the person is usually known; for non-fictional individuals, this is usually the last name. For example, if the chooser chose Sandro Botticelli, then the initial letter would be B. Some individuals are best known by their first name alone, such as Michelangelo or Cher; for these the first initial would be used. For the purposes of phrasing questions and answers, the chooser adopts the chosen identity.

The game has two modes — direct mode and indirect mode — and starts in indirect mode.

=== Indirect mode ===
In indirect mode, the guessers take turns (either in sequence or informally) to think of someone with the designated initial letter. Each guesser asks the chooser a yes/no question using some fact about the guesser's choice. For example, if the letter is B then the guesser might choose Yul Brynner and ask, "Are you bald?" At this point, the chooser has three possible responses:

1. "No, I am not Frank Black." — The chooser has thought of a person who matches the criterion of the guesser's question and is not the chooser's identity. Typically this will be the person the guesser is thinking of, but any other person who matches the question is acceptable. The game remains in indirect mode, and moves to the next guesser.
2. "Yes, I am Yul Brynner." — The chooser's identity meets the criterion of the guesser's question, and the chooser cannot think of anyone else who satisfies it. The guesser wins.
3. "No, and I don't know who you're thinking of." — The chooser can't think of someone meeting the criteria. The guesser reveals their answer, and the game changes to direct mode.

Guessers can use indirect mode to guess the chooser's identity directly (e.g. "Are you Yul Brynner?").

Although the guesser's questions is in the form "Are you...?", it is not necessary for the guesser to choose a person who matches what they have already learned about the chooser's identity. The bar of acceptability for guesser choices is lower than that for the chooser's identity; it is not essential for the chooser to have heard of the person, or to know the relevant biographical detail, but guessers should not deliberately exploit this provision.

=== Direct mode ===
In direct mode, the guesser whose choice enabled the mode switch gets to ask one or more yes/no questions about the chooser's identity, as in Twenty Questions. In some variants, direct mode continues until the chooser answers "no" to a question; some variants allow only a single direct-mode question before returning to indirect mode, regardless of the answer.

If the chooser does not know the answer to a direct mode question, or the question does not permit a clear-cut yes/no answer, then the chooser answers as accurately as possible. There are some conventions for answering contextually inappropriate direct mode questions; for example, fictional characters are usually deemed to be dead if their death has been recorded.

=== Winning ===
The game ends when a guesser successfully determines the chooser's identity. That guesser then becomes the chooser, a new identity and letter are chosen and the game starts again in indirect mode. If the successful guess was suggested by a non-designated guesser in direct mode, then it is normal courtesy for the designated guesser to defer to the other player.

If all guessers give up before winning, then the chooser reveals the identity. The guessers then determine (by majority) whether the choice was a good one (that is, they should all have known of the character and the chooser's answers in direct mode were reasonably accurate). The role of chooser then remains with the same player, or passes to another player (e.g. clockwise) as appropriate. It is considered bad form for one guesser to hold out after everyone else has given up.

== Variants ==
=== Stumping ===
This variant is particularly useful as a pastime for long trips, since a single round can sometimes last over an hour. As in the standard version, the chooser picks a famous person or character and provides an initial (for example, if the chooser picked Sandro Botticelli, he or she would provide the letter "B"). The guesser must then think of a trivia question which can be answered by a word beginning with that letter, so in our example the guesser might ask, "What is the most populous country in South America?", the answer being "Brazil." The answer to the question must be something the chooser could reasonably know, not something personal to the guesser (e.g. "What was the name of my invisible friend when I was five?") or anything otherwise impossible to guess. If the chooser answers correctly, the guesser must think of another question. If the chooser is stumped and cannot answer, the guesser may ask a single yes-or-no question (as in direct mode of the standard version) about the person or character. Once the chooser answers the question, the guesser must stump the chooser again before asking another direct question. Generally, guessing the identity of the person or character counts as a direct question and can only be done after the chooser is stumped; however, in the interest of shortening the game, players sometimes will guess the person without having first stumped the chooser.

=== Confirmation requirement ===
In one variation, the game only moves to direct mode if, after the chooser fails or gives up, another guesser can successfully identify the subject of the question. This provides a built-in standard for whether the question posed by the guesser was fair.

=== Additional letters ===
One variation rewards stumping the chooser (but not fellow guessers) with an additional letter in the chosen person's name. This can make for quicker gameplay.

=== Narrowing down choices ===
This variation requires that indirect questions include all the criteria thus far established. So if it has been determined that the mystery person is a living male movie star, the next question must be about a living male movie star, and so on. This adds a new degree of difficulty, while more directly channeling the game closer to the correct answer.

Another variation on this variation is to start not with a letter, but from scratch.

== Games similar to Botticelli ==
- Vermicelli, in which the thing to be guessed is a food rather than a person.
- Vespucci, in which the thing to be guessed is a place.
- Webster, a challenging variant in which the thing to be guessed can be any word.
- Contact, Webster with stumping and adding letters. If one of the players knows the answer to the question asked to stump the chooser, he makes "contact" with the asker of the question. The two players say "contact" and count to ten. If the chooser cannot guess the answer before then he must reveal the next letter. There is no direct mode.

== Botticelli in popular culture ==
In John Updike's 1968 novel Couples, the protagonists play a version of Botticelli in which responses to guesses give broad hints to aspects of the Identity, but without giving the name away. The pattern of answers shows the reader facets of the individuals' characters and the relationships evolving between them.

The 1968 TV film Prescription: Murder, which introduced the character of Columbo, begins with the murderer (Gene Barry), an arrogant psychiatrist, stumping party guests in a game of Botticelli by choosing Josef Breuer, an obscure 19th-century neurophysiologist.

Napoleon Solo and Illya Kuryakin while away waiting time by playing Botticelli in several novels by David McDaniel based on the 1960s television series The Man from U.N.C.L.E..

A 1971 short play by Terrence McNally called Botticelli features two American soldiers playing the game while fighting in the Vietnam War.

In Tom Robbins 1976 novel Even Cowgirls Get the Blues the protagonist, Sissy Gitche (née Hankshaw), her husband, Indian watercolorist Julian Gitche, and their friends Howard & Marie while away the time by playing Botticelli.

In an episode of the 1980s TV comedy The Young Ones, Rick attempts to teach the game to his housemates, unsuccessfully. Vyvian suggests they instead play "Jelly Botty", which involves eating 18 curries.

In An Acceptable Time, a 1989 young adult science fiction novel by Madeleine L'Engle, the protagonist Poly plays the game with her family and family friends.

In "Funeral for a Fiend", episode 8 of season 19 (2007) of The Simpsons, Cecil (Sideshow Bob's brother) begins to tell Bart how he and Bob used to play the game and begins to discuss the play before concurring with Bart's earlier comment that it is boring.

In Thomas Pynchon's novel The Crying of Lot 49, protagonist Oedipa Maas plays a game they call "Strip Botticelli" with lawyer Metzger in her motel room.

In a Season 5 episode of the TV series Malcolm in the Middle, "Malcolm Dates a Family", Malcolm plays Botticelli with the family of a girl he is dating.

At the beginning of "The Vegas Renormalization", a 2009 episode of The Big Bang Theory, Howard, Sheldon, Leonard, and Raj play Botticelli.

== Sources ==
- "Games: Knowledge Games: Botticelli". Open Site. Archived from the original on February 4, 2005.
- "Car Games". Continuum-Hypothesis.com. David P. Anderson.
