= Paddle ball =

Toy

An illustration of paddle and rubber ball attached together with an elastic band

Paddle ball is a one-person game played with a paddle and an attached ball. Using the flat paddle with the small rubber ball attached at the center via an elastic string, the player tries to hit the ball with the paddle in succession as many times as possible.

The paddle (sometimes called a bolo bat) is similar in size and shape to a table tennis racket. It is usually made from either wood or plastic.

== History ==
Created and patented (U.S. patent 1,529,600) by William R. Lind in the 1920s, the paddle ball was one of several recreational products to follow the invention of soft rubber.

In 1937, the Fli-Back Company was founded in High Point, North Carolina with the paddle-ball as their main product. The paddle logo depicted a cowboy playing paddle ball while riding a bucking bronco. In that year, the toy was featured in Newsweek. This first successful mass-marketing of the toy allowed the company to diversify into other toys, including the yo-yo and spinning tops.

In the 1950s, Duncan Toys Company manufactured the "Hi-Li Paddle Ball Toy" that sold millions of units. The paddle reads “Duncan’s Official Hi-Li, Reg. U.S. Pat. Off., Champion No. 99.”

In 1972, the Ohio Art Company, the makers of the popular Etch-A-Sketch, purchased the Fli-Back Company. They continued to make Fli-Back paddle ball games in High Point until 1983.

In 2000, Yomega received a trademark for "Extreme 180° APB", their paddle ball featuring adjustable cord lengths and ball types.

== In film ==
Paddle balls have been depicted in several motion pictures. In an early demonstration of 3-D effects, the carnival barker in House of Wax is shown doing tricks with a paddle ball to gain the attention of potential customers.

In The Misfits, Marilyn Monroe is depicted provocatively whacking a paddle ball while wearing a polka-dot dress in a saloon in Dayton, Nevada.

In Blazing Saddles, Mel Brooks (in his cameo as the cross-eyed governor) and Harvey Korman use a paddle ball to great comedic effect. Korman's character performs tricks with relative ease and hands the paddle to Brooks, who can barely manage one hit. This was a deliberate anachronism, as the paddle ball would not be invented until fifty years after the film was (mostly) set.

In the Pixar/Disney animated film, WALL-E, there is a brief scene in a montage where the titular robot loses control of a paddle ball and is struck repeatedly in the head. The paddle ball ends up in the "Don't Keep" pile.

In the Paramount Pictures film, Sonic the Hedgehog, Sonic is seen with a paddle ball, making fast hits before ditching the game.

In the DreamWorks Animation film, Over the Hedge, RJ uses a paddle ball by hitting it a few times, and then making the attached ball to get tied on the ceiling in order to go over Vincent to steal his food.

== Records ==
The record for the most paddle balls controlled simultaneously by one person is 7. This was achieved by Steve Langley on the set of Lo Show Dei Record in Milan, Italy, on 8 April 2011. Langley controlled all paddles for 10 seconds, with all balls bouncing simultaneously.

The record for the most people controlling paddle balls at once is 443. Also achieved by Steve Langley, this record was set at O.P. Earle Elementary School and Landrum Middle School in Landrum, South Carolina, on 30 November 2012.

The record for the most people in a paddle ball relay is 162, achieved by a team from Nike Digital Sport in Las Vegas, Nevada, on 20 February 2013. The attempt was held on the plaza of the Fashion Show Mall on the Las Vegas Strip. Each participant was required to have full control of their device before the next person was allowed to begin.
