= Bad Habits (play) =

Play by Terrence McNally

- Original language: English
- Written by: Terrence McNally

Premiere
- Date: February 4, 1974
- Place: Astor Place Theatre

Bad Habits is a play by Terrence McNally. The play premiered Off-Broadway in 1974 in a Manhattan Theatre Club production, and then transferred to Broadway.

== Overview ==
The comedy is composed of what originally were written as two one-act plays set in a nursing home, or sanatorium. In Dunelawn, a doctor allows his patients to indulge in all their bad habits as means of finding happiness. In Ravenswood, a serum is used to provide a cure. The cast of eight actors (6 male, 2 female) all perform in each act, albeit as completely different characters.

== Production history ==
The play premiered Off-Broadway in a Manhattan Theatre Club production at the Astor Place Theatre on February 4, 1974 and closed on April 28, 1974, after 96 performances. Directed by Robert Drivas, the cast featured F. Murray Abraham, Paul Benedict (as Dr. Jason Pepper) and Doris Roberts.

The production transferred to Broadway at the Booth Theatre on May 5, 1974 and closed on October 5, 1974 after 177 performances. The Broadway cast was joined by Cynthia Harris.

A revised version of the play opened at the Manhattan Theatre Club on February 27, 1990 and closed on April 13, 1990. Directed by Paul Benedict, the cast starred Nathan Lane (as Dr. Jason Pepper), Kate Nelligan, Robert Clohessy, and Faith Prince. This version switched the names of the sanitariums to the arrangement mentioned above and added an extra scene to the beginning of Dunelawn, along with numerous other minor changes.

Bad Habits won the Obie Award as Distinguished Play for the 1973–1974 season and Robert Drivas won the Obie Award for Distinguished Direction. Doris Roberts won the Outer Critics Circle Award for Best Actress.

== Plot summary ==
=== Dunelawn ===
Wheel-chaired marriage counselor Dr. Jason Pepper treats his patients in a country club setting complete with a clay tennis court and freely flowing cocktails. Roy and April Pitt arrive as the play opens; they are recently married movie stars who are already seeking couples therapy because of their frequent bickering. Anal-retentive Harry Scupp has been at Dunelawn for three months, and on this day his wife Dolly decides to drive up to encourage him to come home. Hiram and Francis are old friends of questionable sexuality who have been at Dunelawn since it opened years ago, content to stay indefinitely courtesy of Francis' family fortune. Meanwhile, manservant Otto mixes the drinks, carries luggage, and keeps the grounds. Over the course of the play the various couples meet, interact, argue, and even wrestle, with Dr. Pepper encouraging them to do whatever feels good. Very little has changed by the end of the day, except that Harry has decided to return home while Dolly is going to check in.

=== Ravenswood ===
A day in a rehab centre that deals with various "bad habits". The three patients that are introduced through the dialogue are an alcoholic, a drag queen and a perverted sadistic deluded man. Doctor Toynbee, the man in charge of the centre, is described throughout as a great man, a saint, revered by everyone in his presence. The doctor has developed a “serum” that is meant to help get rid of his patients' flaws and worries. However, it lasts momentarily and the effects don't seem to eliminate any amount of the patients’ previous bad habits as a sign of gradual elimination of their bad habits. The play takes place over the course of a sunny afternoon at the centre. Bruno, a worker who helps out Ruth Benson and Becky Hedges, the nurses, and tends to the garden, brings the patients out one by one, where the nurses are giving patients serum, some sun and some fresh air. As he goes back and forth, he “leers” at Hedges, attempting to seduce her. As they wait for Bruno to bring along the next patient, we learn about the two nurses, their own bad habits, past lives, regrets and their striving for reformation. We learn of the trigger for their quest: men; at least in Ruth Benson's case, one man: Hugh Gumbs.

== Critical reception ==
Mel Gussow reviewed the 1974 Broadway production for The New York Times, writing: "This comedy has no problem of adjustment. It fills the Booth Theater with laughter... The attitude is cynical, but the author's humor is tonic rather than toxic... Mr. McNally's needle is right on target - particularly in the first play...a subcutaneous probe of contemporary manners."

Frank Rich, in his New York Times review of the 1990 revival wrote: "...the show has little of the zing audiences rediscovered in the equivalent Joe Orton comedy, the 1967 What the Butler Saw, revived by the Manhattan Theater Club last season. What survives in Bad Habits is not so much a focused evening of theater as a pair of overextended burlesque sketches that live or die from joke to joke... Mr. McNally is incapable of being completely unfunny, and, in his better moments, he imagines a Dr. Feelgood whose unctuously whispered words of wisdom are babytalk and a skirt-chasing gardener whose libidinal urges are written all over his anatomy, not to mention his face."
