= The Last of Mrs. Lincoln =

Play written by James Prideaux

The Last of Mrs. Lincoln is a play by James Prideaux depicting Mary Todd Lincoln in the 17 years following her husband's assassination.

The play ran on Broadway from December 12, 1972 to February 4, 1973, starring Julie Harris, with George Connolly, Kate Wilkinson, Tobias Haller, David Rounds, and Leora Dana. Harris and Dana won Tony awards for their performances on stage.

Harris and Wilkinson reprised their roles in the 1976 television film adaptation of the play, which also featured Denver Pyle, for Hollywood Television Theatre on PBS.
