= Kate Wilkinson (actress) =

American actress

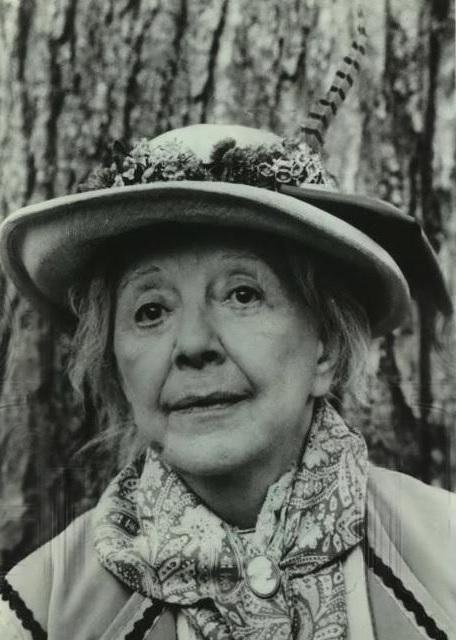
- Wilkinson in 1987
- Born: October 25, 1916; San Francisco, California, U.S.
- Died: February 9, 1993 (aged 76); New York City, New York, U.S.
- Occupation: Actress

Kate Wilkinson (October 25, 1916 – February 9, 1993) was an American stage, film and television actress.

== Career ==
She is best known to TV audiences for her roles as Viola Stapleton in the CBS soap opera Guiding Light, a role she played from 1976 to 1981, and Clara Hudson on the NBC soap opera Another World, which she played from 1987 to 1989.

In addition to making many guest appearances in supporting roles on television as well as a number of films, she also was a regular on theatre. Among her stage roles were Mrs. McCollough in 1972-73's Last of Mrs. Lincoln (she also reprised her role in the 1976 film version), and Clairee in the original Off-Broadway production of Steel Magnolias in 1987 (a role Olympia Dukakis would play in the film version). In 1980, she originated the role of Libby in The Whales of August, which Bette Davis played in the film version. Her last role was a 1990 guest appearance on Law & Order.

== Death ==
Kate Wilkinson died from bone cancer in 1993, aged 76.

== Filmography ==
1. Edge of Night - Mrs. Perkins (1966)
2. Love is a Many Splendored Thing - Sister Irene (1973)
3. Beyond the Horizon - Kate Mayo (1973)
4. F. Scott Fitzgerald and 'The Last of the Belles' (1974)
5. First Ladies Diaries: Martha Washington - Mrs. Chamberlayne (1975)
6. Guiding Light - Viola Stapleton (November 1976 - 1981)
7. Last of Mrs. Lincoln - Mrs. McCollough (1976)
8. Diary of the Dead - Ethel Dean (1976)
9. Another World - Mrs. Franklin (1983); Alice Nixon (1986); Clara Hudson (1987–1989)
10. A Mistaken Charity (made-for-TV movie) - Charlotte (1986)
11. See You in the Morning - Aunt Matilda (1989)
12. Law & Order: (episode: "Prescription for Death") - Grey-haired lady (1990)

== Stage credits ==
1. Danton's Death (October 21, 1965 - November 1965)
2. The Rimers of Eldritch - Martha Truit (February 20, 1967 – March 19, 1967)
3. Watercolor & Criss-Crossing (January 21, 1970 - January 24, 1970)
4. Postcards (March 16, 1970 - March 28, 1970)
5. A Doll's House - Anne Marie (January 13, 1971 - June 26, 1971)
6. Hedda Gabler (February 17, 1971 - June 19, 1971)
7. Ring Around the Bathtub - Nurse Sampson (April 29, 1972 - April 29, 1972)
8. Last of Mrs. Lincoln - Mrs. McCollough (December 12, 1972 - February 4, 1973)
9. Our Town - Mrs. Gibbs (August 3, 1976 - August 7, 1976)
10. The Shadow Box (August 1, 1978 - August 5, 1978)
11. Man and Superman - Mrs. Whitefield (December 14, 1978 - February 18, 1979)
12. Camino Real - The Gypsy (June 28, 1979 – July 7, 1979)
13. The Matchmaker - Miss Flora Van (July 10, 1979 - July 14, 1979)
14. The Man Who Came to Dinner (June 26, 1980 - September 7, 1980)
15. Frankenstein - Frau Mueller (January 4, 1981 - January 14, 1981)
16. Rude Times - Mrs. Crystal (February 1985)
17. A Day in the Death of Joe Egg - Grace (August 11, 1985 - August 22, 1985)
18. Steel Magnolias - Clairee (March 28, 1987 - February 25, 1990)
19. Inherit the Wind - Mrs. Brady (July 24, 1990 - August 4, 1990)
