= House of Wax (1953 film) =

1953 film by André de Toth

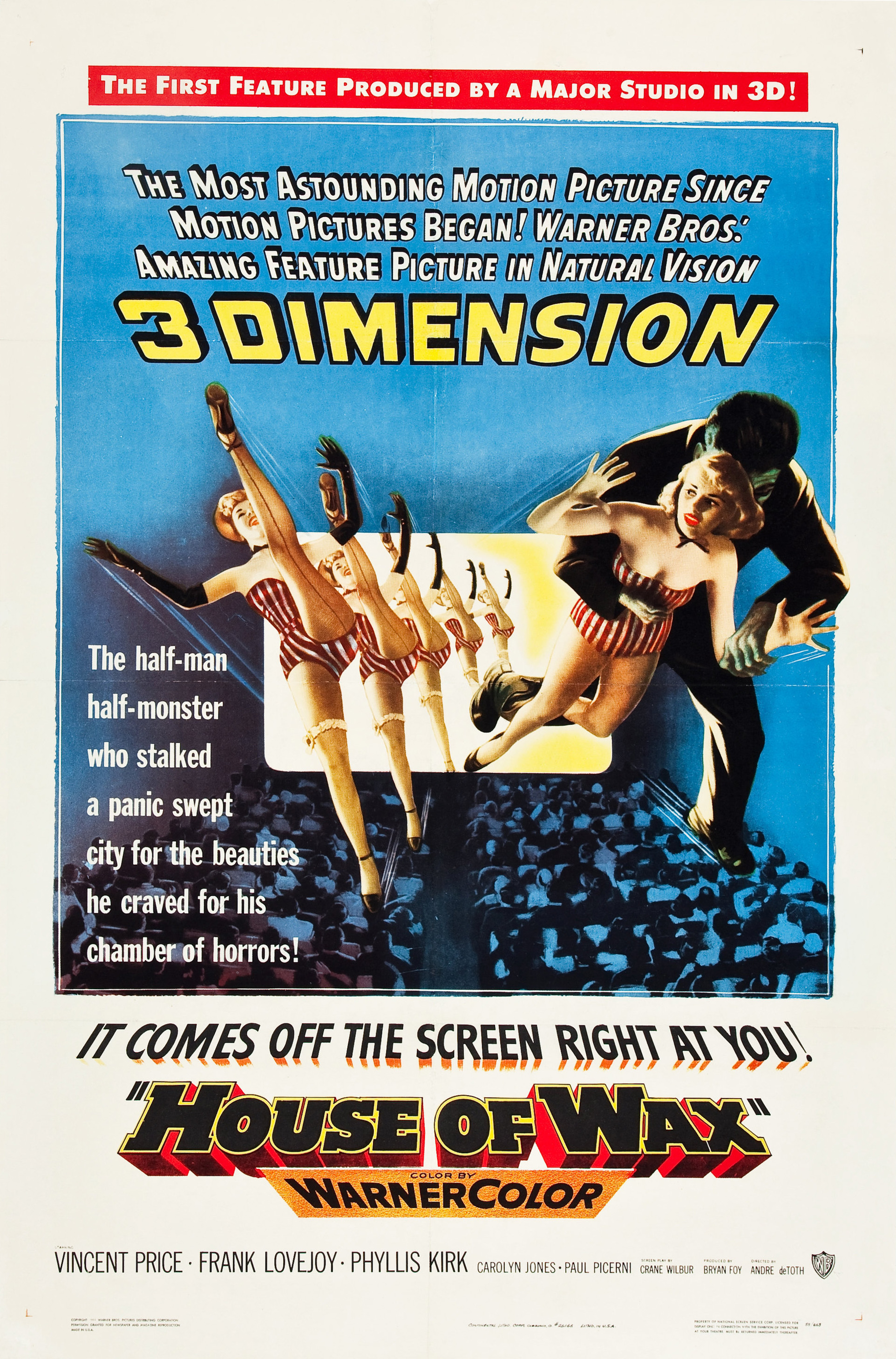
- Theatrical release poster
- Directed by: Andre de Toth
- Screenplay by: Crane Wilbur
- Based on: "The Wax Works" by Charles Belden
- Produced by: Bryan Foy
- Starring: Vincent Price; Frank Lovejoy; Phyllis Kirk; Carolyn Jones; Paul Picerni
- Cinematography: Bert Glennon; Peverell Marley
- Edited by: Rudi Fehr
- Music by: David Buttolph
- Production company: Warner Bros. Pictures
- Distributed by: Warner Bros. Pictures
- Release dates: April 10, 1953 (New York); April 25, 1953 (US)
- Running time: 88 minutes
- Country: United States
- Language: English
- Budget: $1 million
- Box office: $23.75 million

House of Wax is a 1953 American mystery-horror film directed by Andre de Toth and released by Warner Bros. Pictures. A remake of the studio's own 1933 film, Mystery of the Wax Museum, it stars Vincent Price as a disfigured sculptor who repopulates his destroyed wax museum by murdering people and using their wax-coated corpses as displays. The film premiered in New York on April 10, 1953, and had a general release on April 25, making it the first 3D film with stereophonic sound to be presented in a regular theater and the first color 3D feature film from a major American studio. Man in the Dark, released by Columbia Pictures, was the first major-studio black-and-white 3D feature and premiered two days prior.

In 1971, House of Wax was re-released to theaters in 3D with a full advertising campaign. Newly struck prints of the film in Chris Condon's single-strip StereoVision 3D format were used for this release. Another major re-release occurred during the 3D revival of the early 1980s. Warner Bros. later released a loose remake of the film in 2005.

The Library of Congress later selected the film for preservation in the National Film Registry in 2014, deeming it "culturally, historically, or aesthetically significant".

== Plot ==
In New York City during the early 1900s, talented sculptor Professor Henry Jarrod runs a wax museum that features historical figures who have met grisly ends. His business partner, Matthew Burke, wants to end their partnership due to Jarrod's refusal to make sensational exhibits, such as those that draw crowds to their competitors. Wealthy art critic Sidney Wallace offers to buy out Burke on his return from Egypt in three months. Impatient, Burke sets fire to the museum for the insurance money; Jarrod attempts to stop him, but is overpowered and left for dead.

After Burke receives the insurance money, a disfigured man in a cloak strangles him and stages the murder as a suicide. He murders Burke's fiancée, Cathy Gray, but is interrupted by her roommate, Sue Allen, before he can arrange the scene. She runs to her friend Scott Andrews' home, while the murderer steals Cathy's body from the morgue.

Wallace meets Jarrod who survived the fire, now wheelchair-bound and unable to sculpt with his crippled hands. Jarrod asks Wallace to invest in his new wax museum, featuring statues made by his deaf assistant Igor and the alcoholic Leon Averill. He concedes to popular taste by including a chamber of horrors showcasing acts of violence, including Burke's apparent suicide.

Attending the museum's grand re-opening with Scott, Sue is troubled by the resemblance of the Joan of Arc wax figure to Cathy; Jarrod claims he based the figure on newspaper photos of her. He hires Scott as an assistant and asks Sue to model for a Marie Antoinette figure, as she resembles his earlier one. Sue tells Detective Lieutenant Tom Brennan that the Joan of Arc figure shares a distinctive ear piercing with Cathy, which she does not believe would be discernible from a newspaper photo, and agrees to investigate. Sergeant Jim Shane recognizes Averill as the parole-breaking Carl Hendricks and takes him in after finding a missing attorney's pocket watch in his possession.

Sue arrives at the museum after hours to meet Scott, but Jarrod had sent him on an errand when he heard she was coming, and soon discovers Cathy's corpse within the Joan of Arc figure. Jarrod, watching, gets up from his wheelchair, revealing he can walk. Sue strikes him, breaking a wax-made mask concealing his disfigured face identifying him as the murderer, and faints as Jarrod abducts her.

Scott returns and is subdued by Igor. The police draw the truth out of a guilt-ridden Averill – Jarrod was driven mad by his previous museum's destruction and his new wax figures are the wax-coated corpses of his victims. They arrive at the museum just in time to stop Igor from decapitating Scott with an exhibit's guillotine. Jarrod is knocked into a vat of hot wax and killed as Sue is saved.

== Cast ==
- Vincent Price as Professor Henry Jarrod, a disturbed sculptor and the proprietor of the House of Wax
- Frank Lovejoy as Detective Lieutenant Tom Brennan, Scott's police officer friend
- Phyllis Kirk as Sue Allen, an unemployed woman who becomes suspicious of Jarrod's talent
- Carolyn Jones as Cathy Gray, Sue's roommate
- Paul Picerni as Scott Andrews, Sue's sculptor friend
- Roy Roberts as Matthew Burke, Jarrod's scheming business partner
- Angela Clarke as Scott's unnamed mother
- Paul Cavanagh as Sidney Wallace, an investor for the House of Wax
- Dabbs Greer as Sergeant Jim Shane, Tom's partner on the murder case involving the House of Wax
- Charles Bronson (credited as Charles Buchinsky) as Igor, Jarrod's deaf-mute assistant
- Reggie Rymal as a paddle ball-utilizing barker at the House of Wax's grand re-opening

In addition, the face of the wax figure of Marie Antoinette is modelled on Kirk, while that of the wax figure of Joan of Arc is modelled on Jones.

== Production ==
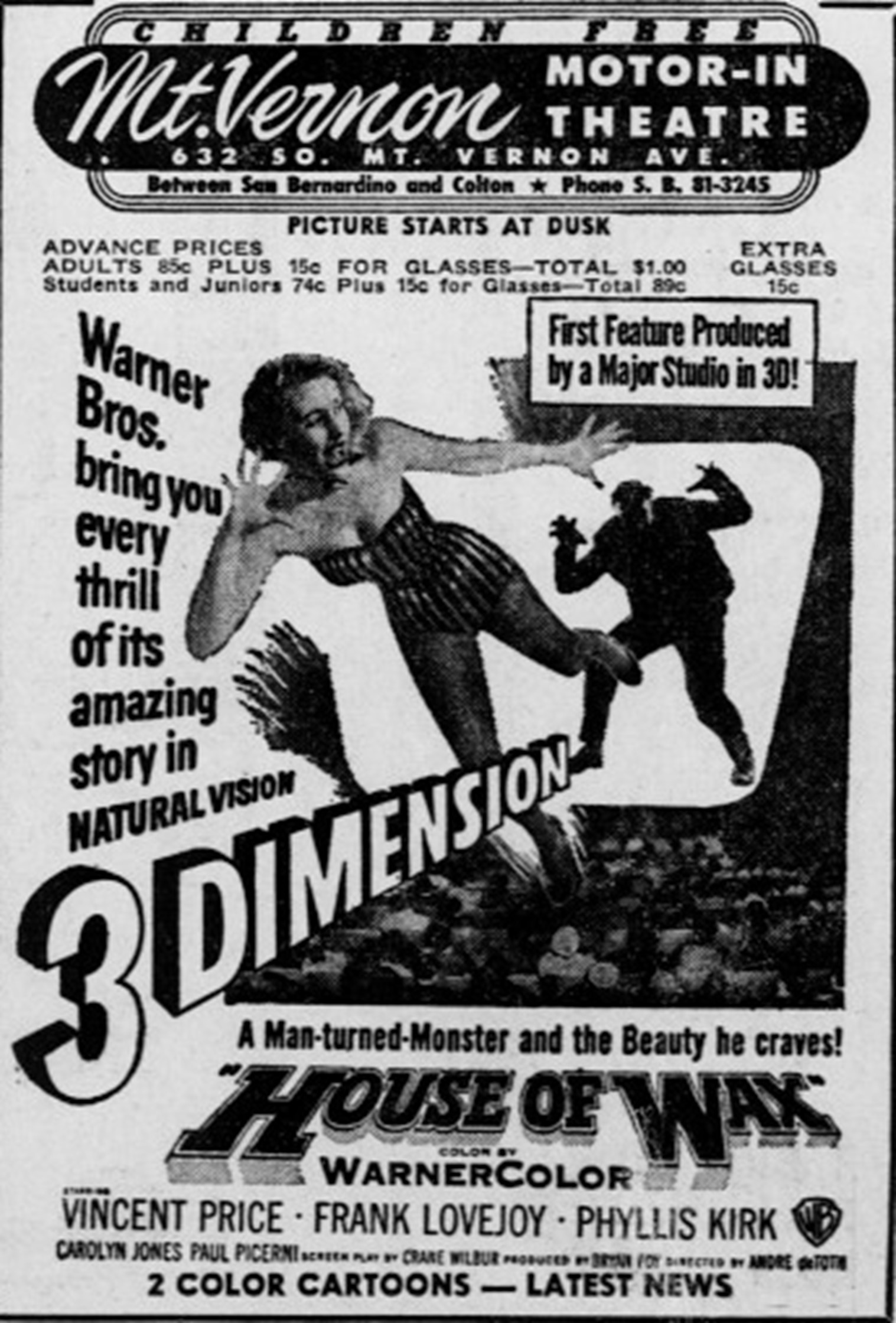
Drive-in advertisement from 1953.

Filmed under the working title The Wax Works, House of Wax was Warner Bros.' answer to the surprise 3D hit Bwana Devil, an independent production that premiered in November 1952. Seeing promise in the future of 3D films, Warner Bros. contracted Julian and Milton Gunzburg's Natural Vision 3D system, the same one used for Bwana Devil, and decided to film a remake of their 1933 two-color Technicolor thriller Mystery of the Wax Museum, which was based on Charles S. Belden's three-act play The Wax Works. Although the entire newspaper angle of the earlier film was eliminated and Mystery was set in the year it was released, whereas House of Wax was set in circa 1902, the two films have many similarities in plot and dialogue.

Among the foregrounded uses of 3D in the film were scenes featuring fights, can-can girls and a paddle ball-wielding barker. In one of the movie's 3D effects, a shadowy figure of one of the characters seems to spring up out of the theater audience and run into the screen. As director Andre de Toth was blind in one eye, he was unable to experience stereo vision or 3D effects. Vincent Price recalled: "It’s one of the great Hollywood stories. When they wanted a director for [a 3D] film, they hired a man who couldn’t see 3D at all! André de Toth was a very good director, but he may not have been suited to direct a 3D movie. He’d go to the rushes and say 'Why is everybody so excited about this?' It didn’t mean anything to him. But he made a good picture, a good thriller. He was largely responsible for the success of the picture. The 3D tricks just happened—there weren’t a lot of them. Later on, they threw everything at everybody." Some modern critics feel de Toth's inability to see depth is what makes the film superior since he was more concerned with telling a thrilling story and getting believable performances from the actors than simply tossing things at the camera.

== Release ==
The film premiered in Los Angeles at the Paramount Theatre on April 16, 1953. It played at midnight with a number of celebrities in the audience, Broderick Crawford, Gracie Allen, Eddie Cantor, Rock Hudson, Judy Garland, Shelley Winters, and Ginger Rogers among them. Producer Alex Gordon, knowing actor Bela Lugosi was in dire need of cash, arranged for him to stand outside the theater wearing a cape and dark glasses and holding a leash with actor Steve Calvert in a gorilla suit on the end. Lugosi was interviewed by reporter Shirley Thomas, who thoroughly confused the aging star when she asked the prearranged questions out of order, and, embarrassed, he left without attending the screening. Footage of Lugosi in front of the theater appeared in a Pathé Newsreel released in theaters on April 27, 1953.

Topping the box office charts for five weeks and earning an estimated $5.5 million in rentals from the North American box office alone, the film was one of the biggest hits of 1953. It was originally available with a stereophonic three-track magnetic soundtrack to accompany its stereoscopic imagery, though many theaters were not equipped to make use of it and defaulted to the standard monophonic optical soundtrack. Previously, films with stereo sound were only produced to be shown in specialty cinemas, such as the Toldi in Budapest and the Telecinema in London. As of 2013, no copy of the original three-channel stereo soundtrack is known to exist, and only the monophonic soundtrack and a separate sound-effects-only track are believed to have survived, but a new stereo soundtrack has been synthesized from the available source material. The initial 3D screenings of the 88-minute film included an intermission, which was necessary to change the reels because each of the theater's two projectors was dedicated to one of the stereoscopic images.

== Reception ==
=== Initial reception ===
Contemporary reviews of the film were mixed. On the positive end, Variety enjoyed the movie, writing: "This picture will knock 'em for a ghoul. Warners' House of Wax is the post-midcentury Jazz Singer. What the freres and Al Jolson did to sound, the Warners have repeated in third dimension." Harrison's Reports called the film "a first-class thriller of its kind", and "the best 3-D picture yet made", though the reviewer felt that "the added value of depth is not significant enough to warrant the annoyance of viewing the proceedings through the polaroid glasses, and that the picture would have been as much of a chiller if shown in the standard 2-D form, and probably even a greater thriller if shown on a wide screen." The Hollywood Reporter appraised it enthusiastically, "The "House of Wax proves once and for all that true stereo combined with perfect color and directional sound is truly a visionary new and exciting medium. A medium which gives the audience the sensation of being closer to the action — the feeling of an eye witness to the events unfolding. Which is why House of Wax is great entertainment, an exciting, diverting thriller. It will bring millions of new and old customers to the box office, and run up a multi-million dollar gross for its producer-distributors."

Conversely, Bosley Crowther of The New York Times found the film "disappointing", writing: "This picture, apart entirely from the fact that it is baldly, unbelievably antique in its melodramatic plot and style, shows little or no imagination in the use of stereoscopic images and nothing but loudness and confusion in the use of so-called stereoscopic sound. The impression we get is that its makers were simply and solely interested in getting a flashy sensation on the screen just as fast as they could." Richard L. Coe of The Washington Post wrote: "It's supposed to be a horror movie and it's horrible alright... The novelty has some appeal especially through its long shots into depths, but there is also a feeling of limitations once what novelty there passes. Then it is we go back to the gaga script devised by Crane Wilbur from a story which served one of the early talking films and one is inclined to shudderingly ask: Are we to go through all that again?" John McCarten of The New Yorker also hated the film, writing that he thought it had "set the movies back about forty-nine years. It could have set them back further if there had been anything earlier to set them back to", and concluding that "when Mr. Price started clumping around and choking ladies with knots that wouldn't pass muster at a Cub Scout meeting, I took off my glasses once and for all, put on my hat, and left."

=== Later reception ===
The film has received much more positive reviews from modern critics. On review aggregator website Rotten Tomatoes, the film has an approval rating of 93% based on 46 reviews and an average score of 7.5 out of 10; its "critics consensus" reads: "House of Wax is a 3-D horror delight that combines the atmospheric eerieness of the wax museum with the always chilling presence of Vincent Price." Likewise on Metacritic, the film has a weighted average score of 68 out of 100 based on 11 critics, indicating "Generally favorable reviews".

== Impact ==
House of Wax revitalized the film career of Vincent Price, who had been playing secondary character parts and occasional sympathetic leads since the late 1930s. After this high-profile role, he was in high demand for the rest of his career to play fiendish villains, mad scientists, and other deranged characters in genre films. The following year, Columbia Pictures hired House of Wax writer Crane Wilbur to pen the script for their attempt to capture the 3D craze alongside Price as star with The Mad Magician (1954). Price would go on to star in genre films such as The Tingler (1959), The Masque of the Red Death (1964), and The Abominable Dr. Phibes (1971). Supporting actress Carolyn Jones, who had her first credited role in House of Wax, gained a much higher profile more than a decade later when she played Morticia Addams in the TV comedy horror spoof The Addams Family.

== Home media ==
The film was released in 2D on DVD by Warner Home Video on August 5, 2003. This release included Mystery of the Wax Museum as a bonus. A 3D Blu-ray disc of the film was released in the U.S. on October 1, 2013, to celebrate its 60th anniversary. Like the earlier DVD, the Blu-ray includes Mystery of the Wax Museum as a bonus (in standard definition). A reissue of this format was released through the Warner Archive Collection on June 23, 2020.

== See also ==
- Mystery of the Wax Museum – the 1933 film of which House of Wax is a remake
- House of Wax – a 2005 film that is a loose remake of House of Wax
- Terror in the Wax Museum – a 1973 film
- Waxwork – a 1988 film
- List of 3D films of the era
- Vincent Price filmography
