= Robert Drivas =

American actor (1935–1986)

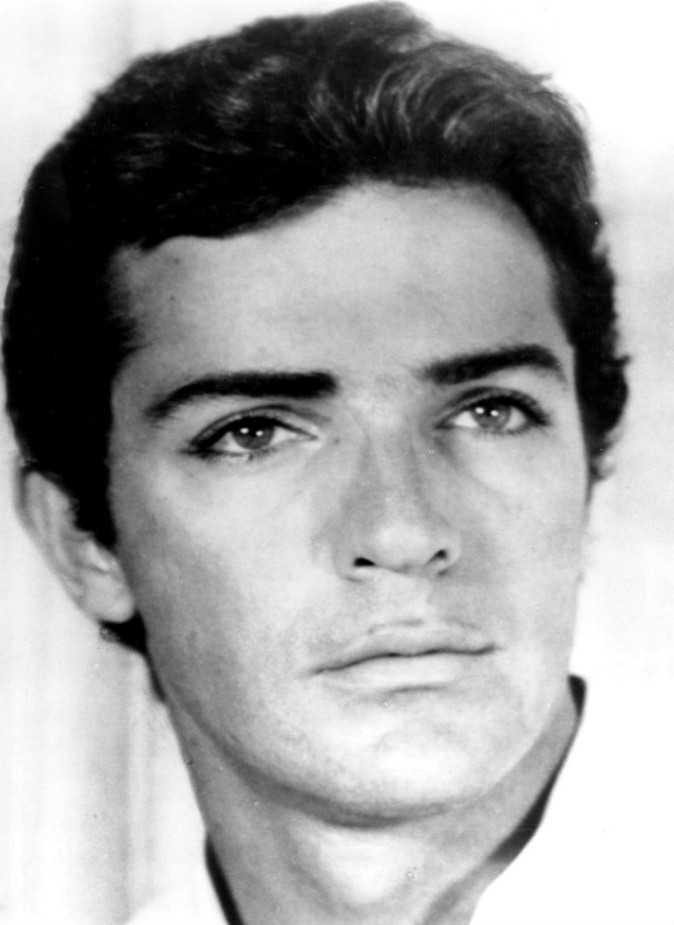
- Drivas in 1973
- Born: Robert Choromokos; November 21, 1935; Coral Gables, Florida, U.S.
- Died: June 29, 1986 (aged 50); New York City, U.S.
- Education: University of Chicago; University of Miami
- Occupations: Actor, theater director
- Years active: 1957–1983

Robert Drivas (born Robert Choromokos; November 21, 1935 – June 29, 1986) was an American actor and theatre director.

== Life and early career ==
Robert Drivas studied at the University of Chicago and the University of Miami with further training at the Greek Playhouse in Athens, Greece. He made his stage debut in Night Must Fall in Coral Gables, Florida, and then appeared in Tea and Sympathy in the role of Tom Lee at the Coconut Grove Playhouse in Miami, and in The Lady's Not for Burning, Death of a Salesman, Thieves' Ball, and A View from the Bridge at the Highland Park Playhouse in Chicago. According to Thomas W. Ennis writing in The New York Times, Tennessee Williams saw Drivas in Tea and Sympathy and asked him to take the lead in his play Sweet Bird of Youth, which had its premiere in Coconut Grove at George Keathley's Studio M Playhouse in 1956.

== Broadway and theatre ==
Drivas made his Broadway debut in the role of Ramses in 1958 in the play The Firstborn, directed by and starring Anthony Quayle as Moses. He continued to perform on stage, as Jacko in the Beverley Cross play One More River (1960), with George C. Scott in the Warsaw Ghetto play The Wall (1960), as Alfred Drake's son Giorgio in the Italian Renaissance set Lorenzo (1963), as Andrew Rankin, the British beatnik son of Cyril Ritchard's character Felix in The Irregular Verb to Love (1963), and in And Things That Go Bump in the Night (1965), which he also directed. In 1963 he won a Theatre World Award for his performance in Mrs. Dally Has a Lover (opposite Estelle Parsons). In 1964, Drivas toured with Cyril Ritchard in The Irregular Verb to Love and they appeared at the original summer stock theater, Denver's Elitch Theatre.

Drivas was associated with many well-known theatrical figures of his time. These included playwrights Terrence McNally, whose play The Ritz he directed in 1975, and Edward Albee, who directed Drivas in the 1983 premiere of Albee's harshly received play The Man Who Had Three Arms. Other directing credits include Bad Habits, for which he won an Obie Award, Legend, Cheaters, It Had to Be You, the 1982 revival of the musical Little Me (with his work there praised by theater critic Clive Barnes who wrote "The whole balance is set right by the present production's firmer sense of form and continuity. The sense once had of a series of black-out sketches has gone and the staging... is smooth, inventive, and comic.") and Peg, a musical biography of singer Peggy Lee, with lyrics and book by the star herself.

== Film and television ==
Concurrent with his theater work, Drivas appeared in television, beginning in 1957, on such crime shows and dramas as Route 66, N.Y.P.D., Bonanza, The Defenders, The Fugitive, 12 O'Clock High, The Wild Wild West, Hawaii Five-O, The Streets of San Francisco and The F.B.I.

Drivas' first film appearance was in the role of Loudmouth Steve in Cool Hand Luke (1967). This debut led to more film work in The Illustrated Man (1969) and the generation-gap drama Where It's At (1969), written and directed by Garson Kanin.

== Personal life ==
Drivas had a long-term relationship with playwright Terrence McNally. Drivas and McNally broke up as a couple in 1976; they remained close friends and often collaborated together.

== Death ==
Drivas died June 29, 1986, of AIDS-related complications at age 50.

== Filmography ==
Year	Title	Role	Notes
1967	Cool Hand Luke	"Loudmouth" Steve	
1969	The Illustrated Man	Willie	
1969	Where It's At	Andy Smith	
1974	Road Movie	Gil	
1976	God Told Me To	David Morten	
1977	La Fille d'Amérique	Matthew	(final film role)
