= David Berry (writer) =

American screenwriter and playwright

- Born: David Adams Berry; July 8, 1943; Denver, Colorado, U.S.
- Died: December 16, 2016 (aged 73); Brooklyn, New York, U.S.
- Occupations: Screenwriter, playwright
- Writing career
- Language: English
- Notable work: The Whales of August

David Adams Berry (July 8, 1943 – December 16, 2016) was an American screenwriter and playwright. He is best known for his stage play The Whales of August and its 1987 screen adaptation, for which he also wrote the screenplay.

== Biography ==
Berry was born in Denver, Colorado in the United States. Berry's first play, G. R. POINT, won him an Obie Award for Distinguished Playwriting and a Drama Desk Nomination for Best New American Play in 1977. The play was produced on Broadway in 1979, directed by William Devane and starring Michael Moriarty, Michael Jeter, and Howard Rollins, Brent Jennings, Lori Tan Chinn and others.

Berry taught playwriting at the National Theatre Institute of the Eugene O'Neill Theater Center in Waterford, Connecticut, as well as for the Worcester, Massachusetts, Consortium for Higher Education. In 2005, he began teaching screenwriting at the School of Visual Arts in New York City. He continued to write for both theatre and film. He died of a heart attack at the age of 73 on December 16, 2016, in Brooklyn, New York.
