= Witness (play) =

1968 play by Terrence McNally

- Original language: English
- Written by: Terrence McNally
- Genre: one-act play

Premiere
- Date: November 21, 1968
- Place: Off-Broadway

Witness is a one-act play by Terrence McNally which opened Off-Broadway at the Gramercy Arts Theatre on November 21, 1968, and closed on January 26, 1969.

== Production ==
Witness premiered Off-Broadway at the Gramercy Arts Theatre in 1968. It starred James Coco, Sally Kirkland, Richard Marr, and Joe Ponazecki, and was paired with another McNally play, Sweet Eros. The production ran through January 26, 1969.

Witness is one of McNally's earlier plays and received mixed reviews.

== Overview ==
The play depicts a man who is planning to assassinate the President of the United States from the window of a building, all the while keeping a gagged and bound victim as a witness to his sanity. One of the play's major themes is loneliness.
