= Some Men =

Some Men is a play by Terrence McNally that consists of an interwoven series of stories which chronicle and contrast the lives and attitudes of gay men in the United States over the past 80 years. The play begins and ends with a contemporary gay wedding, relating interconnecting stories of generations of gay men in New York City. Some Men premiered Off-Broadway in 2007.

== Production history ==
Some Men had a workshop at the Sundance Institute Theatre Laboratory at White Oak (Yulee, Florida). The play had its world premiere at the Philadelphia Theatre Company from May 12 to June 11, 2006.

Some Men premiered Off-Broadway at the Second Stage Theatre on March 26, 2007, and closed on April 22, 2007. Directed by Trip Cullman, the cast featured Fred Weller, Don Amendolia, Kelly AuCoin, Romain Fruge, Michael McElroy and Randy Redd.

The Canadian premiere was produced by Raving Theatre in Vancouver, British Columbia from November 21 - December 2, 2007.

The play had its West Coast premiere at the New Conservatory Theatre Center, San Francisco in June–July 2009.

== Overview ==
In a gay bathhouse in 1975, a school librarian proposes to a war veteran. The scenes shift showing gay men in various places: a Harlem nightclub in 1932, the Stonewall uprising in Greenwich Village in 1969, an AIDS hospital in 1989, an Internet chat room and a piano bar.

== Critical response ==
Ben Brantley, in his review for The New York Times wrote that the play is a "breezy series of sketches about gay American life through eight decades..." but "has little of the psychological texture and shading found in Mr. McNally’s best plays...The hot-button topic of gay marriage is the running theme of 'Some Men,' with the attendant questions that the subject invariably raises."

== Awards and nominations ==
The play received nominations for the Drama Desk Award for Outstanding Play and Outstanding Featured Actor in a Play (Fred Weller). The play received a nomination for the Lucille Lortel Award, Outstanding Featured Actor, David Greenspan, and Outstanding Lighting Design (Kevin Adams).
