= The Sorcerer's Apprentice (1980 film) =

Film directed by Peter Sander

- Directed by: Peter Sander
- Written by: Peter Sander
- Based on: a story by the Brothers Grimm
- Produced by: Peter Sander
- Starring: Vincent Price
- Narrated by: Vincent Price
- Edited by: Michael Guay
- Music by: Hagood Hardy
- Distributed by: Karl-Lorimar Home Video
- Release date: December 1, 1980
- Running time: 26 minutes
- Country: United States
- Language: English

The Sorcerer's Apprentice is a 1980 Canadian animated film by Peter Sander, produced by Sandermation. It was based on a story by The Brothers Grimm and narrated by Vincent Price.
