= Terrence McNally =

American playwright (1938–2020)

- McNally in 2020
- Born: November 3, 1938; St. Petersburg, Florida, U.S.
- Died: March 24, 2020 (aged 81); Sarasota, Florida, U.S.
- Education: Columbia University (BA)
- Occupations: Playwright; librettist
- Spouse: Tom Kirdahy (m. 2003)
- Writing career
- Period: 1962-2020

Terrence McNally (November 3, 1938 – March 24, 2020) was an American playwright, librettist, and screenwriter. Described as "the bard of American theater" and "one of the greatest contemporary playwrights the theater world has yet produced," McNally was the recipient of five Tony Awards. He won the Tony Award for Best Play for Love! Valour! Compassion! and Master Class and the Tony Award for Best Book of a Musical for Kiss of the Spider Woman and Ragtime, and received the 2019 Tony Award for Lifetime Achievement. He was inducted into the American Theater Hall of Fame in 1996, and he also received the Dramatists Guild Lifetime Achievement Award in 2011 and the Lucille Lortel Lifetime Achievement Award. In 2018, he was inducted into the American Academy of Arts and Letters, the highest recognition of artistic merit in the United States. His other accolades included an Emmy Award, two Guggenheim Fellowships, a Rockefeller Grant, four Drama Desk Awards, two Lucille Lortel Awards, two Obie Awards, and three Hull-Warriner Awards.

His career spanned six decades, and his plays, musicals, and operas were routinely performed all over the world. He also wrote screenplays, teleplays, and a memoir. Active in the regional and off-Broadway theatre movements as well as on Broadway, he was one of the few playwrights of his generation to have successfully passed from the avant-garde to mainstream acclaim. His work centered on the difficulties of and urgent need for human connection. He was vice-president of the Council of the Dramatists Guild from 1981 to 2001.

He died of complications from COVID-19 on March 24, 2020, at Sarasota Memorial Hospital in Florida.

== Early life and education ==
McNally was born November 3, 1938, in St. Petersburg, Florida, to Hubert Arthur and Dorothy Katharine (Rapp) McNally, two transplanted New Yorkers from Irish Catholic backgrounds. His parents ran a seaside bar and grill called The Pelican Club, but after a hurricane destroyed the establishment, the family briefly relocated to Port Chester, New York, then to Dallas, Texas, and finally to Corpus Christi, Texas. There Hubert McNally purchased and managed a Schlitz beer distributorship, and McNally attended W.B. Ray High School. Despite his distance from New York City, McNally's parents enjoyed Broadway musicals. When McNally was eight years old, his parents took him to see Annie Get Your Gun, starring Ethel Merman, and on a subsequent outing, McNally saw Gertrude Lawrence in The King and I. McNally later said: "When I saw On the Town, with Frank Sinatra and Gene Kelly and Jules Munshin with the Staten Island Ferry and the Empire State Building, I said: 'That's where I want to live.' I've never regretted it." (Note: He continued: "I feel at home in New York, or I feel like a very welcome visitor.... If you really want to work in theater and you're serious about it — and I got serious about this pretty early — it's the only practical city to live in. If you can find a way. And I was very lucky that this was a much more welcoming city to new artists in the '60s than it is now. It's too expensive to live here now. The young writers I know live in Brooklyn, the Bronx, Queens. Nobody can live on the island now. When I got here at 17, I didn't even visit Brooklyn. I wouldn't leave the island, and now young people can't afford to be on the island, but they seem happy and find a way to make ends meet.) In high school McNally was encouraged to write by a gifted English teacher, Maurine McElroy (1913–2005). (Note: He dedicated both Apple Pie (1968), a collection of one-act plays, and Frankie and Johnnie to her.)

He enrolled at Columbia College in 1956. There he especially enjoyed Andrew Chiappe's two-semester course on Shakespeare in which students read Shakespeare's plays in roughly the order of their composition. He joined the Boar's Head Society and wrote Columbia's annual Varsity Show, which featured music by fellow student Edward L. Kleban and directed by Michael P. Kahn. He graduated in 1960 with a B.A. cum laude in English and membership in Phi Beta Kappa Society. In 1961, McNally was hired by novelist John Steinbeck to tutor his two teenage sons as the Steinbeck family took a cruise around the world. (Note: McNally had been recommended by Molly Kazan, the Steinbecks' neighbor and McNally's mentor at the Playwrights Unit of the Actors Studio.) On the cruise McNally completed a draft of what became the opening act of And Things That Go Bump in the Night. Steinbeck asked McNally to write the libretto for Here's Where I Belong, a musical version of the novel East of Eden.

== Career ==
=== Early career ===
After graduation, McNally moved to Mexico to focus on his writing, completing a one-act play which he submitted to the Actors Studio in New York City for production. While the play was turned down by the acting school, the Studio was impressed with the script, and McNally was invited to serve as the Studio's stage manager so that he could gain practical knowledge of theater. His earliest full-length play, This Side of the Door, deals with a sensitive boy's battle of wills with his overbearing father and was produced in an Actors Studio Workshop in 1962, featuring a young Estelle Parsons. Starting a career that covered both off-Broadway and Broadway, his plays cried out against Vietnam, satirized stale family dynamics, mocked sexual mores and became a part of the social protest movement of the 1960s and early 1970s.

In 1964, his next play And Things That Go Bump in the Night, put homosexuality squarely on stage, which brought him the ire of New York City's conservative theatre critics. It opened at the Royale Theatre on Broadway to generally negative reviews. The play explores the psycho-social dynamic of anxiety that leads one to preemptively and defensively accuse others of creating problems that in actuality result from one's own insecurity. McNally later said, "My first play, Things That Go Bump in the Night, was a big flop. I had to begin all over again." Nevertheless, the producer, Theodore Mann dropped the price of tickets to $1.00 which allowed the production to run with sold-out houses for three weeks.

Next (1968), which brought him his greatest early acclaim and was directed by Elaine May and starred James Coco, follows a married, middle-aged, businessman who has been mistakenly drafted into the armed forces. Botticelli (1968) centers on two American soldiers standing guard in the jungle while making a game of the great names in Western Civilization. ¡Cuba Si! (1968) satirizes the disdain that many Americans feel for the idea of revolution though United States was itself born out of a revolution. It starred Melina Mercouri. In Where Has Tommy Flowers Gone? (1971) he celebrates while mourning the ineffectiveness of the American youth movement's conviction to "blow this country up so we can start all over again." Sweet Eros (1968) is about a young man who professes his love to a naked woman he has gagged and bound to a chair. In Let It Bleed (1972) a young couple showers and becomes convinced an intruder is lurking on the other side of the shower curtain. These and his other early plays, including Tour (1967), Witness (1968), and Bringing It All Back Home (1970), and Whiskey (1973), form a dark satire on American moral complacency.

McNally turned to comedy and farce, beginning with Noon (1968), a sexual farce revolving around five strangers who are lured to an apartment in lower Manhattan by a personal advertisement. Bad Habits, which satirizes American reliance upon psychotherapy, premiered at the John Drew Theatre in East Hampton, New York, in 1971 starring Linda Lavin. It transferred to the Booth Theatre on Broadway in 1974 and garnered an Obie Award. The Ritz is a farce centering on a straight man who inadvertently takes refuge in a Mafia-owned gay bathhouse. It opened at the National Theatre in Washington, D.C., and moved to the Longacre Theatre on Broadway in 1975. Robert Drivas, then McNally's romantic partner, directed both productions. McNally adapted the play for the motion picture, The Ritz (1976), directed by Richard Lester. In 1978, McNally wrote Broadway, Broadway, which failed in its Philadelphia try-out starring Geraldine Page. Rewritten and retitled It's Only a Play, it premiered in off-Broadway in 1985 at Manhattan Theatre Club directed by John Tillinger and starring Christine Baranski, Joanna Gleason, and James Coco.

=== Mid-career ===
After the failure of Broadway, Broadway and living briefly in Hollywood, he returned to New York City and formed an artistic relationship with Manhattan Theatre Club. The rapid spread of AIDS fundamentally changed his writing. McNally only became truly successful with works such as the off-Broadway production of Frankie and Johnny in the Clair de Lune and its screen adaptation with stars Al Pacino and Michelle Pfeiffer. His first Broadway musical was The Rink in 1984, a project he joined after the score by composer John Kander and lyricist Fred Ebb had been written. In 1990, McNally won an Emmy Award for Best Writing in a Miniseries or Special for Andre's Mother, a drama about a woman coping with her son's death from AIDS. A year later, in Lips Together, Teeth Apart, two married couples spend the Fourth of July weekend at a summer house on Fire Island. They are all afraid to use the pool given that its owner has just died of AIDS. It was written for Christine Baranski, Anthony Heald, Swoosie Kurtz (taking the place of Kathy Bates), and frequent McNally collaborator Nathan Lane, who had also starred in The Lisbon Traviata.

With Kiss of the Spider Woman (based on the novel by Manuel Puig) in 1992, McNally returned to the musical stage, collaborating with Kander and Ebb on a script which explores the complex relationship between two men jailed together in a Latin American prison. Kiss of the Spider Woman won the 1993 Tony Award for Best Book of a Musical, the first of McNally's four Tony Awards. He collaborated with Stephen Flaherty and Lynn Ahrens on Ragtime in 1997, a musical adaptation of the E. L. Doctorow novel, which tells the story of Coalhouse Walker Jr., a black musician who demands retribution when his Model T is destroyed by a mob of white troublemakers. The musical also features such historical figures as Harry Houdini, Booker T. Washington, J. P. Morgan, and Henry Ford. For his libretto, McNally won his third Tony Award. Ragtime finished its Broadway run on January 16, 2000. A revival in 2009 closed after only two months.

McNally's other plays from this period include 1994's Love! Valour! Compassion!, with Lane and John Glover, which examines the relationships of eight gay men; it won McNally his second Tony Award; and Master Class (1995), a character study of legendary opera soprano Maria Callas, which starred Zoe Caldwell and won the Tony Award for Best Play, McNally's fourth.

McNally's Corpus Christi (1997) became the subject of protests. In this retelling of the story of Jesus' birth, ministry, and death, he and his disciples are portrayed as homosexual. The play was initially canceled because of death threats against the board members of the Manhattan Theatre Club, which produced the play. The board relented after several other playwrights, including Athol Fugard, threatened to withdraw their plays if Corpus Christi was not produced. A crowd of almost 2,000 protested the play as blasphemous at its opening. After it opened in London in 1999, a group called the "Defenders of the Messenger Jesus" issued a fatwa sentencing McNally to death. In 2008, the play was revived in New York City at Rattlestick Playwrights Theatre. Reviewing this production for The New York Times, Jason Zinoman wrote that "without the noise of controversy, the play can finally be heard. Staged with admirable delicacy... the work seems more personal than political, a coming-of-age story wrapped in religious sentiment."

=== Late career ===
In 2000, McNally partnered with composer and lyricist David Yazbek to write the musical The Full Monty, which was directed by Jack O'Brien and choreographed by Jerry Mitchell. It had an initial run at The Old Globe Theatre and then transferred to the Eugene O'Neill Theatre on Broadway. The opening night cast included Patrick Wilson, Andre De Shields, Jason Danieley, Kathleen Freeman, Emily Skinner, and Annie Golden. It was nominated for 12 Tony Awards including for McNally's book. It later transferred to the Prince of Wales Theater in London's West End.

McNally collaborated on several new American operas. His voice may be more familiar with opera fans than theater-goers, as for nearly 30 years (1979–2008) he was a member of the Texaco Opera Quiz panel that fielded questions during the weekly Live from the Met radio broadcasts. He wrote the libretto for Dead Man Walking, his adaptation of Sister Helen Prejean's book, with a score by Jake Heggie. The opera had its world premiere at San Francisco Opera in 2000 and subsequently received two commercial recordings and over 40 productions worldwide, making it "one of the most successful American operas in recent decades." In 2007, Heggie composed a chamber opera, Three Decembers, with a libretto by Gene Scheer based on a text McNally had created in 1999 for a Christmas concert to benefit Broadway Cares/Equity Fights AIDS, Some Christmas Letters (and a Couple of Phone Calls, Too). In October 2015, Dallas Opera presented Great Scott with an original libretto by McNally and a score by Heggie. The new opera starred Joyce DiDonato and Frederica von Stade and was directed by Jack O'Brien.

The Kennedy Center presented three of McNally's plays that focus on opera under the heading Nights at the Opera, in March 2010. It included a new play, Golden Age; Master Class, starring Tyne Daly; and The Lisbon Traviata, starring John Glover and Malcolm Gets. Golden Age subsequently ran Off-Broadway at the Manhattan Theatre Club New York City Center – Stage I from November 2012 to January 2013.

In 2001, McNally started what became a 15-year developmental process towards Broadway with the musical The Visit, for which he wrote the book. The music is written by John Kander and the lyrics by Fred Ebb. Adapted from Friedrich Dürrenmatt's 1956 satire, The Visit is the story of a widow who has amassed enormous sums of wealth and returns to her hometown to seek revenge on the villagers who scorned her in her youth. The project originally starred Angela Lansbury who departed the process to care for her ailing husband. Chita Rivera became the new star and The Visit had its first production at The Goodman Theater in Chicago in 2001. The first preview was held just ten days after the September 11 attacks, and the producers were unable to get many investors or critics from New York City to fly to Chicago. In 2004, Fred Ebb, the lyricist, died. Its next regional production occurred in 2008 at The Signature Theatre outside of Washington, D.C. In 2014, under the direction of John Doyle and starring Chita Rivera and Roger Rees, The Visit had a new production at Williamstown Theatre and then transferred to Broadway at The Lyceum Theatre in 2015. The musical was nominated for five Tony awards including for McNally's book.

Continuing his work on librettos, McNally partnered with his collaborators on Ragtime, Stephen Flaherty and Lynn Ahrens, to write the musical A Man of No Importance which premiered at Lincoln Center in 2002 and was directed by Joe Mantello. He also wrote the libretto for Chita Rivera: The Dancer's Life, in 2005, another collaboration with Stephen Flaherty and Lynn Ahrens, which began at The Old Globe and subsequently transferred to Broadway at the Gerald Schoenfeld Theatre.

In 2004, Primary Stages presented McNally's The Stendhal Syndrome, which according to McNally explores "how art can affect us emotionally, psychologically, and erotically." The play starred Isabella Rossellini and Richard Thomas and was directed by Leonard Foglia. In 2007, Philadelphia Theatre Company presented Some Men, which explores the evolution of gay relationships and same-sex marriage. It went on to Second Stage Theatre in New York and was directed by Trip Cullman. That same year McNally's drama Deuce ran on Broadway at the Music Box Theater for a limited engagement in 2007 for 121 performances. Directed by Michael Blakemore, the play starred Angela Lansbury, in her return to Broadway after more than 20 years, and Marian Seldes.

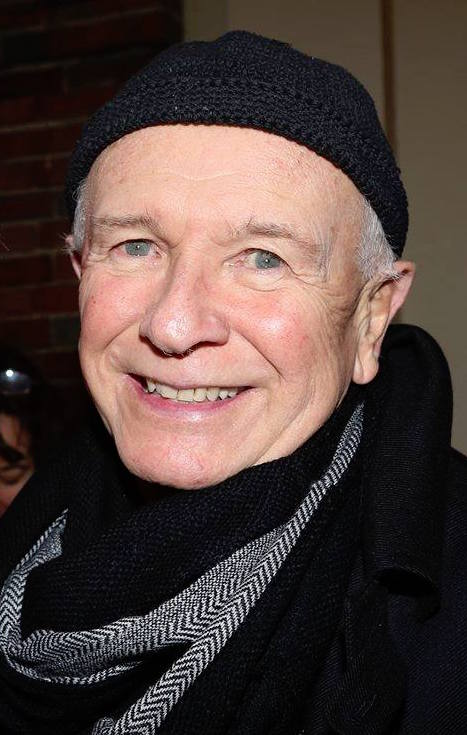
McNally in 2013

And Away We Go premiered Off-Broadway at the Pearl Theatre in November 2013, with direction by Jack Cummings III and featured Donna Lynne Champlin, Sean McNall and Dominic Cuskern. The play takes place over several millennia covering the most pivotal moments in dramatic history entwined with a modern-day story of a struggling theatre company. McNally said that "It's very much written for the Pearl, the company that has kept the faith for the great classic plays. There are whole seasons in New York when I don't think a single classic play would have been performed if it hadn't been for the Pearl... I think it's really important. I write new plays for a living; I certainly don't think theatre should be just revivals, but there has always got to be a place for Chekhov, Ibsen, Shakespeare, Moliere and Aeschylus."

Mothers and Sons starring Tyne Daly and Frederick Weller opened on Broadway at the John Golden Theatre, where Master Class had its premiere, on March 24, 2014 (February 23, 2014, in previews). Mothers and Sons premiered at the Bucks County Playhouse (Pennsylvania) in June 2013. Vermont Stage opened its production January 27, 2016 at FlynnSpace in Burlington, Vermont. The play is an expansion on his 1988 drama Andre's Mother, which was set at a memorial service for a victim of the AIDS crisis. Mothers and Sons also marked the first time a legally wed gay couple was portrayed on Broadway. It was nominated for two Tony Awards including for Best Play.

McNally's Fire and Air premiered Off-Broadway at Classic Stage Company on February 1, 2018. The play explores the history of the Ballets Russes, the Russian ballet company, with a particular focus on Sergei Diaghilev, the ballet impresario, and Vaslav Nijinsky, the dancer and choreographer. It featured the actors Douglas Hodge, Marsha Mason, Marin Mazzie, John Glover, and Jay Armstrong Johnson and was directed by Tony Award-winner John Doyle.

On May 29, 2019, a revival of Frankie and Johnny in the Clair de Lune opened on Broadway at the Broadhurst Theatre. The production starred Audra McDonald and Michael Shannon, and was directed by Arin Arbus in her Broadway debut.

In June 2019, to mark the 50th anniversary of the Stonewall riots, an event widely considered a watershed moment in the modern LGBTQ rights movement, Queerty named him one of the Pride50 "trailblazing individuals who actively ensure society remains moving towards equality, acceptance and dignity for all queer people".

McNally received a Special Tony Award for Lifetime Achievement in 2019.

== Personal life ==
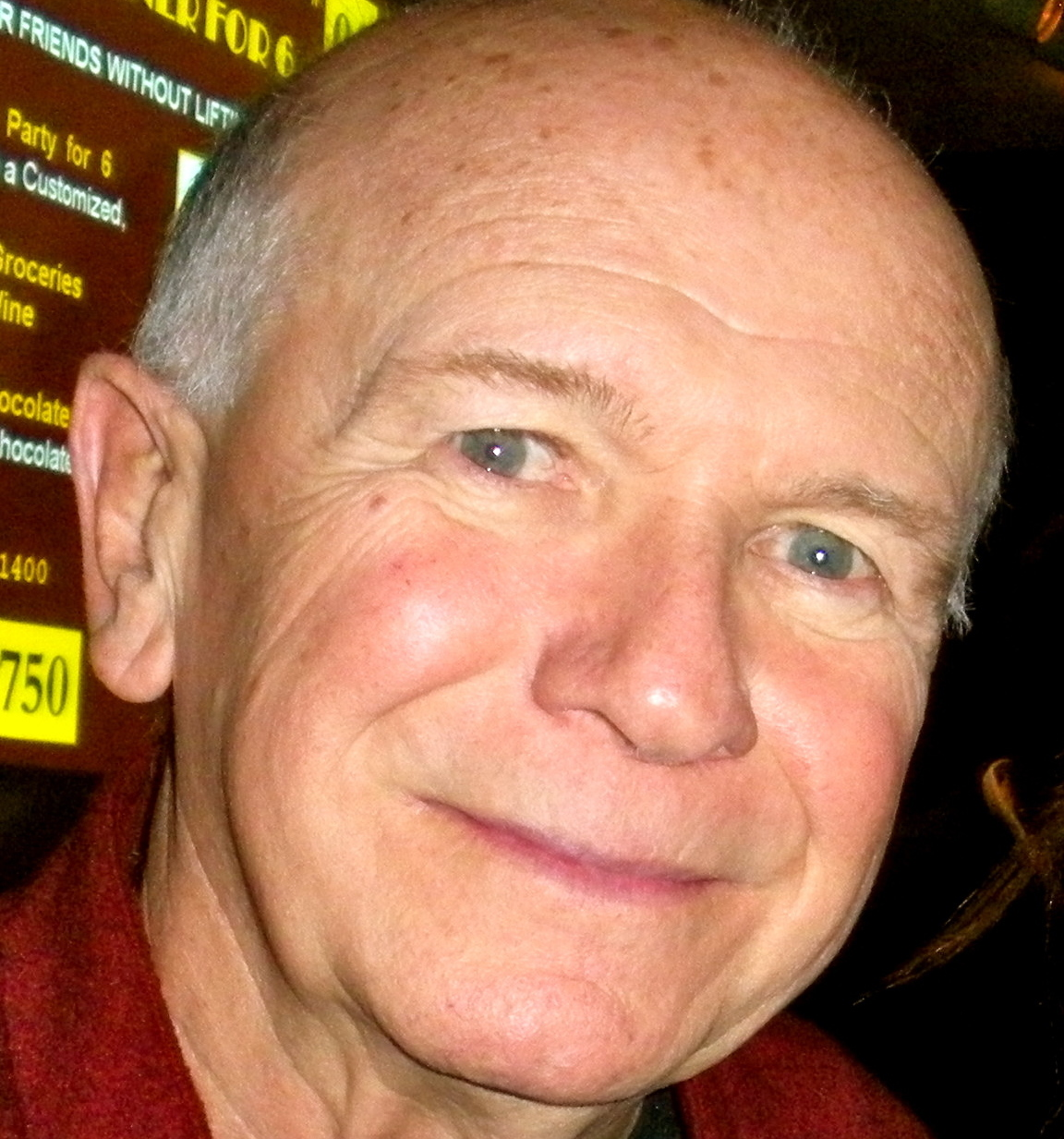
McNally in 2009

In his early years in New York City, McNally's interest in theatre brought him to a party where, departing, he shared a cab with Edward Albee, who had recently written The Zoo Story and The Sandbox. They functioned as a couple for over four years during which Albee wrote The American Dream and Who's Afraid of Virginia Woolf? He was frustrated by Albee's lack of openness about his sexuality. McNally later said: "I became invisible when press was around or at an opening night. I knew it was wrong. It's so much work to live that way." After his relationship with Albee, McNally entered into a long-term relationship with the actor and director Robert Drivas. Drivas and McNally broke up as a couple in 1976; they remained close friends until Drivas died of AIDS-related complications ten years later.

McNally was partnered to Tom Kirdahy, a Broadway producer and a former civil rights attorney for not-for-profit AIDS organizations, following a civil union ceremony in Vermont on December 20, 2003. They married in Washington, D.C., on April 6, 2010. In celebration of the Supreme Court's decision to legalize same-sex marriage in all 50 states, they renewed their vows at New York City Hall with Mayor Bill de Blasio, Kirdahy's college roommate, officiating on June 26, 2015.

As a young man, McNally was a heavy drinker. He relates that while attending a party in 1980 he spilled a drink on Lauren Bacall. "Then someone I hardly knew, Angela Lansbury, [said] 'I just want to say, I don't know you very well, but every time I see you, you're drunk, and it bothers me.'...She was someone I revered, and she said this with such love and concern. I went to an A.A. meeting, and within a year, I had stopped drinking."

When given his Tony for Lifetime Achievement in June 2019, he began his acceptance speech saying "Lifetime achievement. Not a moment too soon." He wore a cannula and appeared short of breath. McNally died at Sarasota Memorial Hospital in Sarasota, Florida, on March 24, 2020, at the age of 81, from complications of COVID-19 during the COVID-19 pandemic. He had previously overcome lung cancer in the late 1990s that cost him portions of both his lungs due to the disease, and he was living with COPD at the time of his death.

== On theater ==
For McNally, the most important function of theatre was to create community and bridge rifts opened between people by differences in religion, race, gender, and particularly sexual orientation.

In an address to members of the League of American Theatres and Producers he remarked, "I think theatre teaches us who we are, what our society is, where we are going. I don't think theatre can solve the problems of a society, nor should it be expected to ... plays don't do that. People do. [But plays can] provide a forum for the ideas and feelings that can lead a society to decide to heal and change itself."

== Archive ==
McNally donated his papers to the Harry Ransom Center at the University of Texas at Austin. The archive includes all of his major works for stage, screen, and television, as well as correspondence, posters, production photographs, programs, reviews, awards, speeches, and recordings. It is an open archive. He had previously deposited his papers at the University of Michigan. His high school English teacher, Maurine McElroy, who had since become head of freshman English at the University of Texas, influenced his choice of Texas.

== Documentary ==
Terrence McNally: Every Act of Life, a documentary about McNally's life and career, aired on PBS on June 14, 2019, as part of their American Masters series. The film features new interviews with McNally in addition to conversations with his friends and collaborators, including F. Murray Abraham, Christine Baranski, Tyne Daly, Edie Falco, John Kander, Nathan Lane, Angela Lansbury, Marin Mazzie, Audra McDonald, Rita Moreno, Billy Porter, Chita Rivera, Doris Roberts, John Slattery and Patrick Wilson, plus the voices of Dan Bucatinsky, Bryan Cranston and Meryl Streep. Charles McNulty, reviewing the film for the Los Angeles Times, wrote, "If you can know a person by the company he keeps, you can judge a playwright by the talent that sticks by him. By this measure, Terrence McNally was one of the most important dramatists of the last 50 years."

== Writing credits ==
Plays:

- And Things That Go Bump in the Night (1964)
- Botticelli (1968)
- Sweet Eros (1968)
- Witness (1968)
- ¡Cuba Si! (1968)
- Bringing It All Back Home (1969)
- Noon (1968), second segment of Morning, Noon and Night
- Apple Pie
  - Three one-act plays: Tour, Next (in two versions), and Botticelli
- Next (1969)
- Where Has Tommy Flowers Gone? (1971)
- Bad Habits (1974)
  - Two one act plays: Ravenswood and Dunelawn
- Whiskey (1973)
- The Tubs (1974), early version of The Ritz
- The Ritz (1975)
- It's Only a Play (1986)
- Frankie and Johnny in the Clair de Lune (1987)
- Hope (1988), second segment of Faith, Hope and Charity
- Andre's Mother (1988) (Note: McNally contributed eight minutes to a theater anthology, Urban Blight and later developed it as Andre's Mother.)
- The Lisbon Traviata (1989)
- Prelude and Liebestod (1989)
  - Later presented as half of The Stendhal Syndrome (2004)
- Lips Together, Teeth Apart (1991)
- A Perfect Ganesh (1993)
- Hidden Agendas (1994)
- Love! Valour! Compassion! (1994)
- By the Sea, By the Sea, By the Beautiful Sea (1995)
- Master Class (1995)
- Corpus Christi (1998)
- The Stendhal Syndrome (2004)
  - Two one-act plays: Full Frontal Nudity and Prelude and Liebestod
- Dedication or The Stuff of Dreams (2005)
- Some Men (2006)
- The Sunday Times (2006)
- Deuce (2007)
- Unusual Acts of Devotion (2008)
- Golden Age (2009)
- And Away We Go (2013)
- Mothers and Sons (2014)
- Fire and Air (2018)
- "Immortal Longings" (2019)

Musical Theatre:

- Here's Where I Belong (1968)
- The Rink (1984)
- Kiss of the Spider Woman (1992)
- Ragtime (1996)
- The Full Monty (2000)
- The Visit (2001)
- A Man of No Importance (2002)
- Chita Rivera: The Dancer's Life (2005)
- Catch Me If You Can (2011)
- Anastasia (2016)

Opera:

- The Food of Love (1999), music by Robert Beaser (Note: A one-act opera premiered in an anthology of three, each with its own librettist and composer.)
- Dead Man Walking (2000), music by Jake Heggie
- Three Decembers (2008), music by Jake Heggie, libretto by Gene Scheer (Note: Based on an unpublished McNally text, Some Christmas Letters.)
- Great Scott (2015), music by Jake Heggie

Film:

- The Ritz (1976)
- Frankie & Johnny (1991)
- Love! Valour! Compassion! (1997)

TV:

- Mama Malone (1984)
- Andre's Mother (1990)
- The Last Mile (1992)
- Common Ground (2000) (Note: McNally contributed one act, Mr. Roberts, to this three act anthology.)

== Awards and nominations ==
=== Tony Awards ===
Year	Work	Category/award	Result	Ref.
1993	Kiss of the Spider Woman	Best Book of a Musical	Won	
1995	Love! Valour! Compassion!	Best Play	Won	
1996	Master Class	Best Play	Won	
1998	Ragtime	Best Book of a Musical	Won	
2001	The Full Monty	Best Book of a Musical	Nominated	
2014	Mothers and Sons	Best Play	Nominated	
2015	The Visit	Best Book of a Musical	Nominated	
2019	Special Tony Award for Lifetime Achievement in the Theatre		Received	

=== Drama Desk Awards ===
Year	Work	Category/award	Result	Ref.
1975	The Ritz	Outstanding New Play (American)	Nominated	
1990	The Lisbon Traviata	Outstanding New Play	Nominated	
1992	Lips Together, Teeth Apart	Outstanding New Play	Nominated	
1995	Love! Valour! Compassion!	Outstanding Play	Won	
1996	Master Class	Outstanding Play	Won	
1998	Ragtime	Outstanding Book of a Musical	Won	
2001	The Full Monty	Outstanding Book of a Musical	Nominated	
2003	A Man of No Importance	Outstanding Book of a Musical	Nominated	
2006	Dedication or The Stuff of Dreams	Outstanding Play	Nominated	
2007	Some Men	Outstanding Play	Nominated	
2015	The Visit	Outstanding Book of a Musical	Nominated	
2017	Anastasia	Outstanding Book of a Musical	Nominated	

=== Primetime Emmy Awards ===
Year	Work	Category/award	Result	Ref.
1990	Andre's Mother	Outstanding Writing in a Miniseries or a Special	Won	

=== Other awards ===
- 1966, 1969 Guggenheim Fellowship
- 1974 Obie Award Winner, Distinguished Play – Bad Habits
- 1992 Lucille Lortel Award Winner, Outstanding Play – Lips Together, Teeth Apart
- 1992 Lucille Lortel Award Winner, Outstanding Body of Work
- 1994 Pulitzer Prize for Drama Nomination – A Perfect Ganesh
- 1995 Obie Award Winner, Playwriting Award – Love! Valour! Compassion!
- 1996 inducted into the American Theater Hall of Fame.
- In 1998, McNally was awarded an honorary degree from the Juilliard School in recognition of his efforts to revive the Lila Acheson Wallace American Playwrights Program with fellow playwright John Guare.
- In 2011 he received the Dramatists Guild Lifetime Achievement Award.
- In 2013 he was the keynote speaker for the Columbia College class of 2013.
- In 2016, Lotos Club State Dinner honoree
- In 2018, he was inducted into the American Academy of Arts and Letters, the highest recognition of artistic merit in the United States.
- In 2019, he received an honorary doctorate from New York University.

== See also ==
- List of Tony Award records
