= Botticelli (play) =

Botticelli is a one-act play written by Terrence McNally, initially broadcast on television in 1968.

== Productions ==
Botticelli was first broadcast by Channel Thirteen in New York City on March 14 and 15, 1968, on the television show New York Television Theatre. Botticelli was one of three one-act plays, under the overall title of Apple Pie (the other two were Tour and Next), which focused on the Vietnam War. It was directed by Glenn Jordan and starred Kevin O'Connor and Roy London.

Botticelli was presented on stage at the outdoor Theatricum Botanicum, Topanga Canyon, California in July and August 1986.

== Overview ==
During the Vietnam War, two soldiers wait in the jungle to kill an enemy Vietcong fighter. While they wait they play the game of Botticelli. The enemy appears and the soldiers kill him, all the while continuing to play the game. The civilized and cultured nature of the game contrasts ironically with the brutal indifference of war.

== Critical response ==
George Gent, in his review for The New York Times wrote that Botticelli was the "most successful in purely dramatic terms" of the three plays. He further commented that the play shows a "chilling comment on the inhumanity of war." Toby Silverman Zinman in her book McNally: A Casebook wrote that Botticelli shows McNally's "virtuosity as a playwright", but that "the target is again neither sufficiently sharp nor compelling."

Peter Wolfe points out that "McNally's early work features many recurring elements: the Vietnamese war of Botticelli (1968), Witness (1968) and Bringing It All Back Home (1969)."
