= Me, Myself and I (play) =

Me, Myself and I is a 2007 play by Edward Albee. It is an absurdist family comedy/drama.

== Synopsis ==
The play tells a complex story of Mother, who has an intimate relationship with Doctor, and who has problems telling her 28-year-old sons apart. Part of the problem may be that she has named her two sons “OTTO” and “otto”—an example of what the Doctor calls “symmetry, yes, but not logic”. The play begins when OTTO tells his mother that he's leaving home to become Chinese and that his brother no longer exists. This upsets otto, who has been searching for some kind of confirmation that he is alive. Maureen, otto's girlfriend, becomes drawn into this. Word games and semantics, ideas about the various meanings and aspects of love, along with riffs on various cultural references, abound in this play.

== Production history ==
Me, Myself and I was first produced in 2008 at the McCarter Theatre in Princeton, New Jersey. It was directed by Emily Mann with set design by Thomas Lynch and costume design by Jennifer von Mayrhauser. The cast consisted of Tyne Daly (Mother), Michael Esper (OTTO), Brian Murray (Dr.), Charlotte Parry (Maureen), Stephen Payne (the Man) and Colin Donnell (otto).

Ben Brantley, in a 2008 review for The New York Times, wrote that Me, Myself and I is “in the tradition of Mr. Albee’s mid- and late-career works like The Marriage Play and The Play About the Baby: fragmented philosophical vaudevilles that turn the most fundamental questions of identity into verbal soft-shoes. It also harks back to his early exercises in absurdism (including the one-acters The Sandbox and The American Dream), coal-black comedies from a time when brash young writers reveled in toppling theatrical traditions."

The play premiered in New York at Playwrights Horizons in September 2010. The cast featured Elizabeth Ashley (Mother), Zachary Booth (OTTO), Brian Murray (Dr.), Natalia Payne (Maureen), Stephen Payne (the Man) and Preston Sadleir (otto).
