= Sudie Bond =

American actress (1923–1984)

Sudie Bond (born Sude Stuart Bond; July 13, 1923 – November 10, 1984) was an American actress on film, stage, and television.

== Early years ==
Sude (later changed legally to Sudie as it was pronounced phonetically) Bond was born July 13, 1923, one of four children of J. Roy Bond, an industrialist, and Carrie Bond. She grew up in Elizabethtown, Kentucky, and was active in horsemanship competition as a youngster and during her years in college. By 1938, she was acting in plays. In 1940, she graduated from the Fassifern School in Hendersonville, North Carolina. She went on to attend Virginia Intermont College and Rollins College, where she was a member of the Rollins Student Players.

== Career ==
In 1945, Bond appeared in the supporting cast of Slice It Thin! at the Blackfriars Guild. She worked as choreographer for the play From Morn Till Midnight.

Films in which Bond acted included Tomorrow (1972 film),The Gold Bug, Johnny Dangerously, Love Story, Silkwood, Swing Shift, and Where the Lilies Bloom. On television, she portrayed Violet Stapleton, Rita's mother, on Guiding Light. She also appeared on All in the Family, Benson, Flo, Mary Hartman, Mary Hartman, Maude, and Television Playhouse.

Bond made her Broadway debut in Summer and Smoke (1952). Her other roles on Broadway included Olga in Tovarich (1952), Estelle in The Waltz of the Toreadors (1957), Justine in The Egg (1962), Miss Prose in Harold (1962), Mrs. Lazar in My Mother, My Father and Me (1963), Miss Hammer in The Impossible Years (1965), Betsy Jane in Keep It In the Family (1967), Old Woman in Box / Quotations From Chairman Mao Tse-Tung (1968), Grandma in The Death of Bessie Smith / The American Dream (1968), Mrs. Margolin in Forty Carats (1968), Clara in Hay Fever (1970), Miss Lynch in Grease (1972), Street Lady in Thieves (1974), and Juanita in Come Back to the Five and Dime, Jimmy Dean, Jimmy Dean (1982).

Her off-Broadway credits included The Shepherd's Chameleon (1960), The American Dream / The Death of Bessie Smith (1961), The Zoo Story / The American Dream (1962), The American Dream / Dutchman (1964), Home Movies / Softly Consider the Nearness (1964), The Great Western Union (1965), The Memorandum (1968), The Local Stigmatic (1969), and The Cherry Orchard (1976).

== Death ==
Bond was found dead in her New York City apartment on November 10, 1984. She was 61 years old. (Note: Bond lopped five years off her age when filling out official documents; her year of birth was therefore wrongly given as 1928 on her death certificate as well as in the press.) Her death was attributed to a respiratory ailment.

== Recognition ==
Bond won three Obie Awards for her performances in the off-Broadway plays The American Dream, The Endgame, and The Sandbox.
