= Finding the Sun =

Finding the Sun is a one-act play by American playwright Edward Albee.

== Productions ==
It was written in 1983 under commission for the University of Northern Colorado and first performed there in May 1983 with Albee directing. It was next performed at the University of California-Irvine (May 1984) and the University of Houston (1984).

Albee postponed the New York debut of the play because, as he noted, another play, Coastal Disturbances opened in 1987 with a beach setting. He did not want anyone to think that his play was influenced by the other.

The play premiered Off-Broadway at the Signature Theatre Company in a triple bill with Box and The Sandbox. The plays ran from February 4, 1994, to March 6, 1994. Directed by Albee, the cast was John Carter (Hendon), Brendan Corbalis (Daniel), Monique Fowler (Cordelia), Cheryl Gaysunas (Abigail), Bethel Leslie (Gertrude), Neil Maffin (Benjamin), Mary Beth Peil (Edmee), and James Van Der Beek (Fergus).

The play was produced in London at the National Theatre, Cottesloe Theatre, in a double bill with Marriage Play, in May 2001. The cast featured Sheila Gish (as the "rich widow"), Pauline Lynch and Polly Walker (as the "neglected wives").

== Overview ==
The single act is divided into 21 short scenes (some only a minute long) that run together with a "breath" in between. The play takes place on a sunny New England beach populated by four male-female character pairs.

The oldest married couple in the play is Henden and Gertrude, aged 70 and 60 respectively. Each has a child from a previous marriage, and those two children form another couple: Daniel and Cordelia. A third, slightly younger married couple is Benjamin and Abigail. Benjamin and Daniel used to be together in a homosexual relationship, and their wives and parents are aware of this. The fourth pair is 45-year-old Edmee and her sixteen-year-old son, Fergus; they have never met the other characters before.

Over the course of the play, Edmee and Fergus meet the other characters and learn of Benjamin and Daniel's history. The young wives struggle with their husbands' latent feelings for each other. Benjamin and Abigail have a tiff, and Benjamin seeks comfort with Daniel. Meanwhile, Abigail tries to drown herself in the ocean and Henden dies sitting in his chair.

=== Characters ===
Source: Script

- Abigail—age 23, not pretty, not plain
- Benjamin—30, blonde and handsome
- Cordelia—age 28, attractive in a cold way
- Daniel—age 37, good-looking
- Edmee—age around 45, stylish
- Fergus—age 16, swimmer's body
- Gertrude—age 60, "elegant outdoors woman"
- Henden—age 70, big, "looks like a retired diplomat"

== Critical response ==
David Richards, in his review of the 1994 production for The New York Times, wrote: "It consists of the juxtaposed conversations of eight people at the beach -- two young men who were once lovers, and their wives; an older married couple, and a mother and her precocious son. The talk ranges from the difficulty of relationships to friendships, face lifts and the compromises life exacts of people. There's some speculation about the meaning of things. Then death happens right there on the shore. The lines can seem mannered, the plotting utterly random.... Viewed in light of the two preceding plays, as a fusion of the absurdism in 'Sandbox' and the rarefied musings of 'Box,' it appears far more sure of itself. A fugue on loneliness and love lost (or never found), it is clearly part of a continuum that also includes 'Seascape.'"

Phyllis T. Dircks (professor of English at Long Island University in Greenvale, New York) observed that "critics...have sometimes lamented the lack of sharp characterization and conventional dramatic action, and the omission of a protagonist... There are no sustained bursts of wit, as ...in Who's Afraid of Virginia Woolf ...no bursts of absurdist comedy, as in The American Dream. Finding the Sun has quite a different purpose, and Albee has satisfied his purpose in executing a precise and haunting study of loss."
