= William Flanagan (composer) =

American composer

William Flanagan, 1961

William Flanagan (August 14, 1923 – September 1, 1969) was an American composer of the mid-twentieth century.

== Biography ==
Flanagan was a great admirer of Maurice Ravel, David Diamond, and Aaron Copland, who became something of a mentor to Flanagan. His best work was in the realm of vocal music. Although little known today, as well as unsuccessful and undervalued in his time, a number of his brief vocal compositions, including Horror Movie and The Upside-Down Man, have been recorded. He is best known today as having been the long-time lover of playwright Edward Albee, with whom he wrote an opera after Bartleby, the Scrivener. He composed music for the 1960 premiere of Albee's play The Sandbox as well as Albee's adaptations The Ballad of the Sad Cafe (1963 from the Carson McCullers and Malcolm (1966, from the James Purdy novel). In 1963, Albee wrote one act of The Ice Age, a libretto for Flanagan, but the opera was never completed. Flanagan committed suicide in 1969, at age 46, after which Copland eulogized him in a memorial concert given by Albee and Ned Rorem. At the concert, Albee "announced that he was planning to open a writers' colony in Montauk to be called the William Flanagan Memorial Creative Persons Center. Some of Flanagan's scores and papers are in the William Flanagan Papers collection at the New York Public Library for the Performing Arts.

== Musical style ==
Flanagan was "an unappreciated conservative in a time of artistic upheaval". His compositional technique and musical preferences were molded in the 1930s and 1940s; he did not make the fashionable transition to serialism. He said, in his program notes, "Since I'd spent the Forties being brainwashed in the historically inevitable 'musical direction' of Stravinsky's neoclassicism, I had agonized over my apparently glandular inability to Go In The Right Direction." He went on to express relief that, when Neo-classicism suddenly gave way to "dodecaphony," that he had done neither, and was not trapped within the trends. "[His] warm music and cool intellect" were influenced most by Copland and Diamond.

Flanagan was best known for songs. Rorem describes Flanagan's compositional style thus: "Today, with a volume of symphonic and chamber works to his credit, Flanagan still thinks of music as 'sung'". Flanagan himself considered his songwriting style to be "'not just prosodized [sic] declamation, but...a bona fide lyric utterance'".

Flanagan "was passionately concerned with language and felt that American composers would never fully realize themselves until they came to grips with native inflection. Ned Rorem, in his New Grove's article on Flanagan, says that Flanagan was "directly responsible for the oral style in the early plays of his close friend Edward Albee".

In his book Music and People, Ned Rorem described Flanagan's musical style: "Flanagan yearns...for the more easy communicative style that ripened in America nearly twenty years ago (in the 1940s) .... Flanagan's musical 'birth' is of that time, and in growing he has remained faithful to its premise, if not to the specific mannerisms of the period".

== Grants and commissions ==
- 2 Grants from the Ford Foundation
- Grant and commission from the New York City Opera for The Ice Age.
- Commission from the Detroit Symphony Orchestra for a work celebrating its 50th anniversary (Narrative for Orchestra, 1963).
- Commission from the Clarion Music Society.
- Commission from the Thorne Foundation for a piece for voice and orchestra, performed at a festival celebrating the move of the Juilliard School to its new location (1963?).
- Nominated for the Pulitzer Prize for Music, 1968.
- Grant from the American Academy of Arts and Letters, 1968.
