= Lyceum Theatre (Broadway) =

Broadway theater in Manhattan, New York

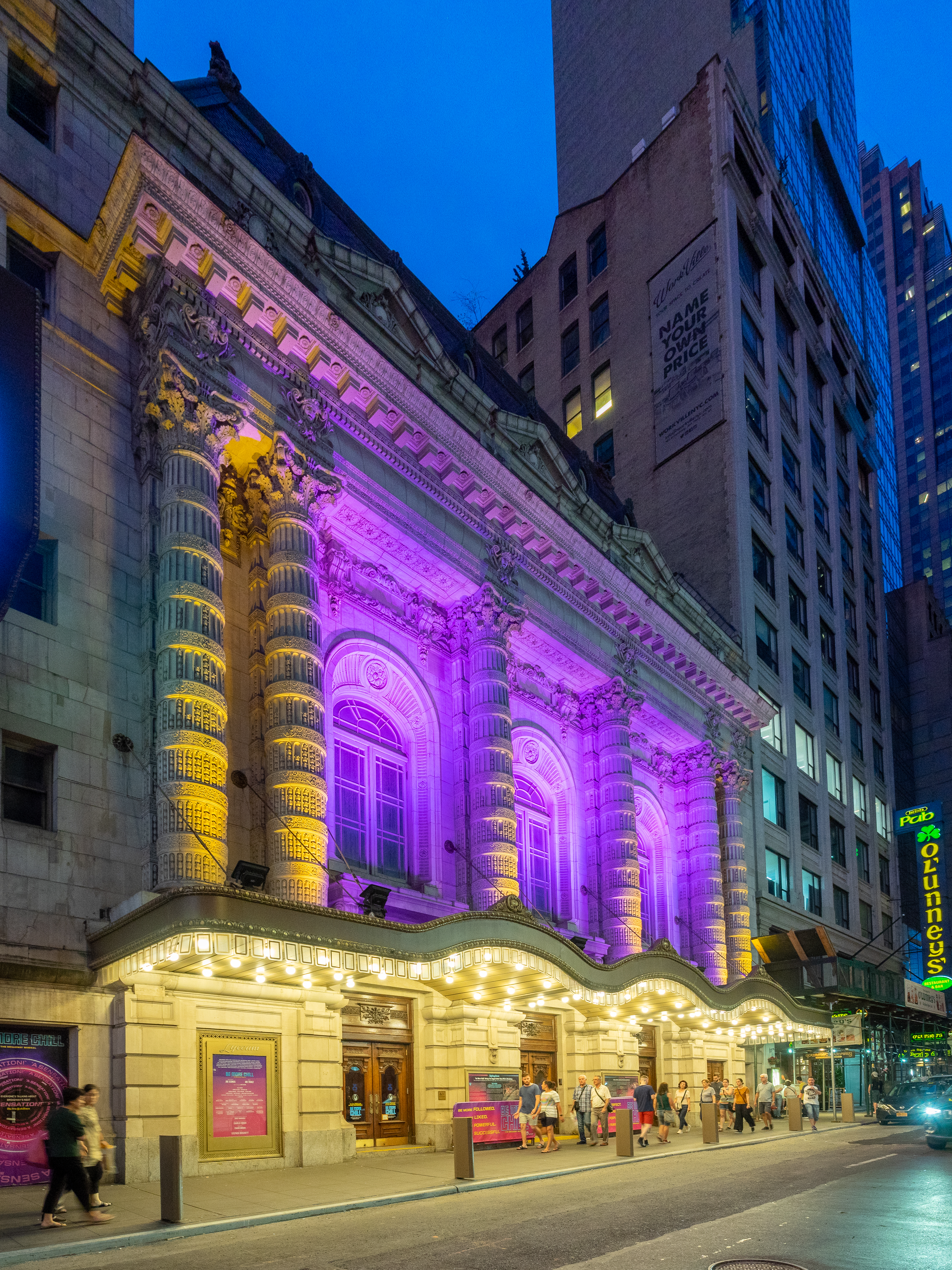
- The theater showing Be More Chill (2019)
- Interactive map of Lyceum Theatre
- Address: 149 West 45th Street; Manhattan, New York; United States
- Coordinates: 40°45′28″N 73°59′05″W
- Owner: The Shubert Organization
- Capacity: 922
- Type: Broadway
- Production: Oh, Mary!

Construction
- Opened: November 2, 1903 (122 years ago)
- Years active: 1903–present
- Architect: Herts & Tallant

Website
- https://shubert.nyc/theatres/lyceum/

New York City Landmark
- Designated: November 26, 1974
- Reference no.: 0803
- Designated entity: Facade

New York City Landmark
- Designated: December 8, 1987
- Reference no.: 1352
- Designated entity: Lobby and auditorium interior

The Lyceum Theatre (/laɪˈsiːəm/ ly-SEE-əm) is a Broadway theater at 149 West 45th Street in the Theater District of Midtown Manhattan in New York City, New York, U.S. Opened in 1903, the Lyceum Theatre is one of the oldest surviving Broadway venues, as well as the oldest continuously operating legitimate theater in New York City. The theater was designed by Herts & Tallant in the Beaux-Arts style and was built for impresario Daniel Frohman. It has 922 seats across three levels and is operated by The Shubert Organization. The facade became a New York City designated landmark in 1974, and the lobby and auditorium interiors were similarly designated in 1987.

The theater maintains most of its original Beaux-Arts design. Its 45th Street facade has an undulating glass-and-metal marquee shielding the entrances, as well as a colonnade with three arched windows. The lobby has a groin-vaulted ceiling, murals above the entrances, and staircases to the auditorium's balcony levels. The auditorium has an ornately decorated proscenium and boxes, but the ceiling and walls are relatively plain. An apartment above the lobby, originally used by Frohman, was converted to the headquarters of the Shubert Archives in 1986. The stage door entrance is through 152 West 46th Street, a 10-story wing designed by Herts & Tallant, which also houses the dressing rooms and some backstage facilities.

The current Lyceum replaced Frohman's earlier Lyceum on Fourth Avenue, which closed in 1902. The current theater opened on November 2, 1903, with the play The Proud Prince. Frohman's brother Charles served as the theater's manager until dying in 1915, and Daniel Frohman subsequently partnered with David Belasco to show productions at the theater until 1930. Afterward, Frohman lost the theater to foreclosure in the Great Depression, and a syndicate composed of George S. Kaufman, Max Gordon, and Moss Hart bought the theater in 1940. The Shubert Organization has operated the theater since 1950. The Lyceum was leased to the Association of Producing Artists (APA) and Phoenix Theatre in the late 1960s and to the National Actors Theatre during much of the 1990s.

== Site ==
The Lyceum Theatre is on 149 West 45th Street, between Seventh Avenue and Sixth Avenue near Times Square, in the Theater District of Midtown Manhattan in New York City, New York, U.S. The land lot covers 10,125 square feet (940.6 m^{2}), with a frontage of 85.73 feet (26.13 m) on 45th Street and a depth of 200.84 feet (61 m). A wing runs northward to 46th Street. The modern theater's site covers five land lots at 149 to 157 West 45th Street, collectively measuring 88 by 100 feet (27 by 30 m), as well as a rear lot on 152 West 46th Street, measuring 16 by 100 feet (4.9 by 30.5 m). These lots formerly contained houses.

On the same block, the Museum of Broadway adjoins the theater; additionally, 1540 Broadway is to the west, and Americas Tower and High School of Performing Arts are to the east. Other nearby buildings include the Church of St. Mary the Virgin to the northeast; the Palace Theatre, Embassy Theatre, and I. Miller Building to the north; the Millennium Times Square New York and Hudson Theatre to the south; and the Hotel Gerard and Belasco Theatre to the southeast.

== Design ==
The Lyceum Theatre was designed by Herts & Tallant in the Beaux-Arts style and constructed from 1902 to 1903 for impresario Daniel Frohman. Operated by the Shubert Organization, it is the oldest continuously operating legitimate theater in New York City.

=== Facade ===
==== 45th Street ====
The primary elevation of the facade is on 45th Street and is made of limestone. A promotional brochure from the theater's opening in 1903 said that the facade "recalls in its style and amplitude the best period of Roman art". The street-level facade is made of rusticated blocks of limestone. Three large archways lead into the lobby; their doors are made of painted wood and contain arched panels of glass. The street level entrances are shielded by a sinuous marquee canopy made of iron and glass. When the theater opened, the entrance had a self-supporting canopy that could shield either five or eight carriages unloading their passengers. In 1986, the canopy was replaced with a replica that was cantilevered from the facade with metal rods. The modern canopy has moldings of pressed metal, medallions above each archway, and glass panels hanging underneath the canopy. The design of the Lyceum's canopy was subsequently replicated by that of the Paramount Theatre. (Note: The Paramount Theatre's original marquee was removed after the theater closed in 1967, but a replica marquee was erected at the same site in 2001.)

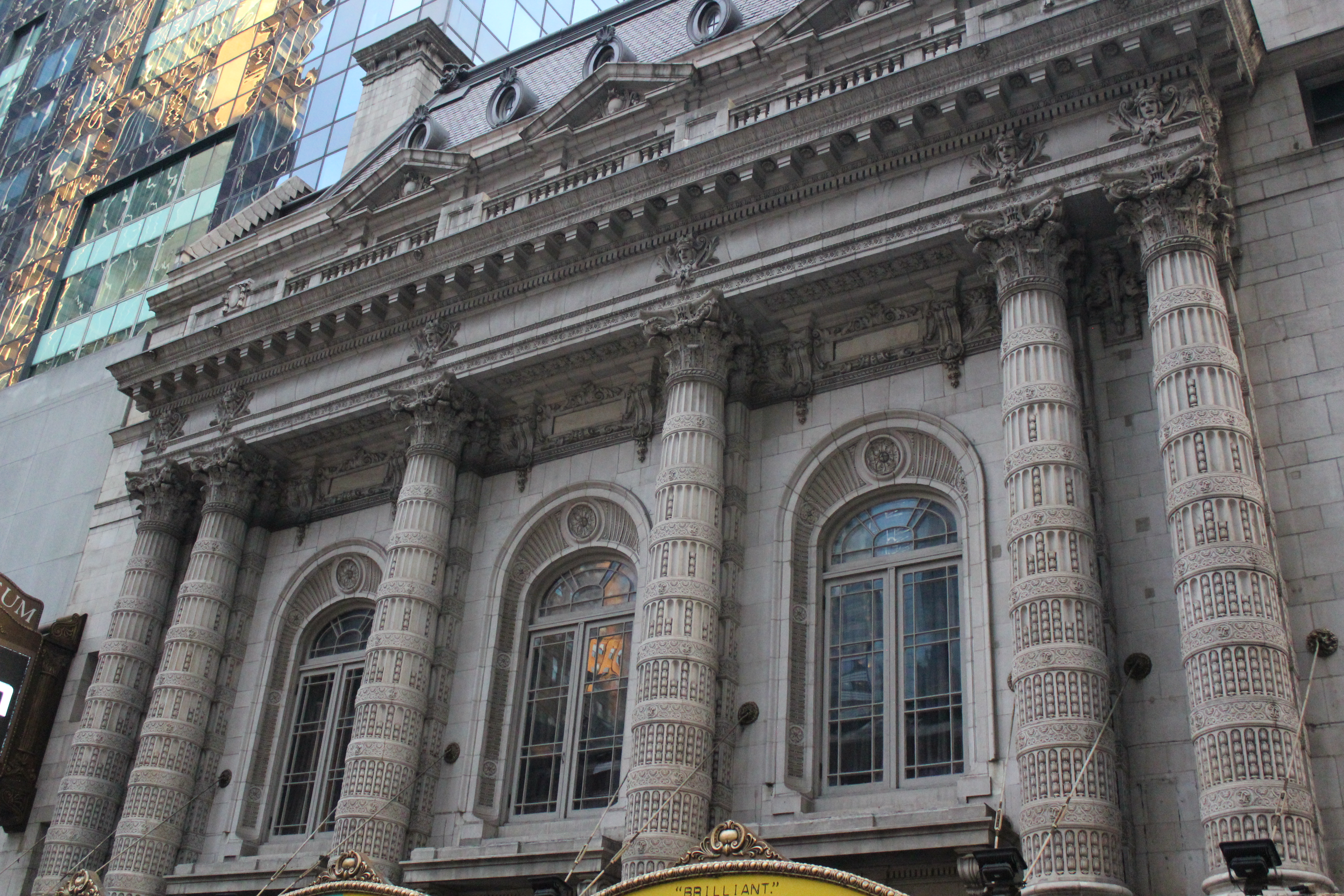
Colonnade

Above the entrance, the 45th Street elevation contains a colonnade of three bays. The bays are delineated by a pair of neoclassical fluted columns at each end, as well as two single columns in the center. Each column contains fluting, bands with foliate ornament, and ornate capitals. Within each bay is a French window with a three-centered arched surround. There were also statues within each bay, which have since been removed. A frieze runs above the windows, containing six stone faces that signify both comedy and tragedy. An entablature runs above the columns. The three bays are flanked by a pair of outer pavilions that have no ornament at all. The colonnade and marquee were particularly intended to attract a "more cultured audience" than similar theaters.

The theater contains a mansard roof above the entablature. The mansard roof contains three windows within triangular pediments, which illuminate a penthouse in the roof. A balustrade, directly on top of the entablature, encloses a balcony at the penthouse level. There are also six oval windows above the penthouse, which illuminate a former rehearsal hall. The roof also had four large urns that emitted gas at night. The urns were used to draw attention to the theater, since it was on a side street north of the other theaters of the time. At the theater's construction in 1903, the roof was described as being of "purple slate" with a bronze statue. The Lyceum's roof had two water towers, collectively capable of storing 15,000 U.S. gallons (57,000 L; 12,000 imp gal).

==== 46th Street ====
The stage door entrance is through the wing on 152 West 46th Street. Herts & Tallant designed the 46th Street wing with ten or eleven stories. The wing has a utilitarian design and contains vestiges of a slit that carried backdrops between the stage and the upper-story studios.

=== Interior ===
Frohman had offices on the upper portion of the main 45th Street structure, while the rear annex on 46th Street contained auxiliary facilities such as storage and dressing rooms. The color scheme of the interior was compared in contemporary media to autumn foliage, with a range of hues from "deep yellow to warm red and brown". From the outset, the auditorium was designed to use electric lighting exclusively. A switchboard controlled the stage lighting, which could be controlled to be as bright as natural illumination. The theater was also mechanically advanced for its time, with heating, cooling, and ventilation systems, as well as a fireproof structural frame. The air-intake system consisted of blowers that drew air from the chimneys and passed the air through a porcelain duct, a set of silk filters, and water sprayers. The auditorium floor had "mushrooms" for air intake and outflow. The heating and ventilation system could change the auditorium's air every six minutes.

==== Lobby ====
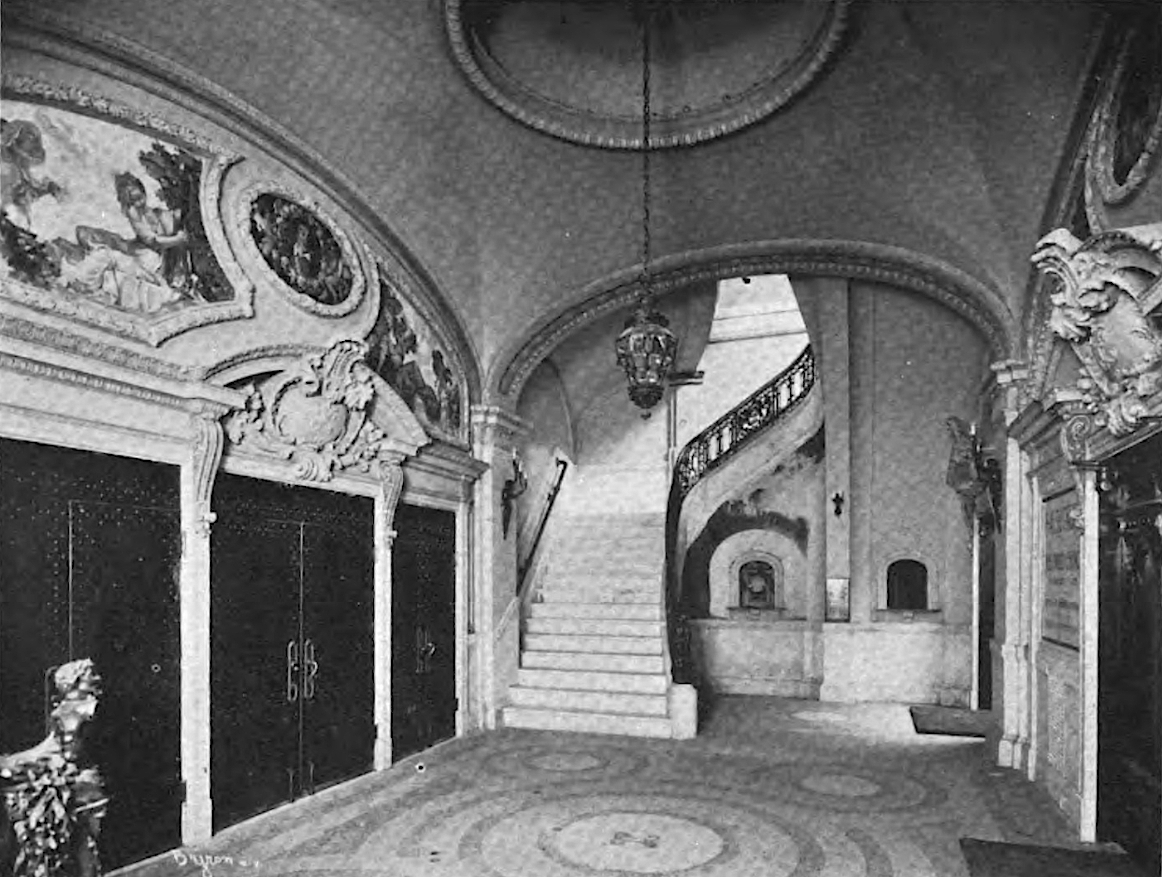
Eastward view of the lobby, with auditorium doors at left

The entrance lobby is a rectangular space, with elliptical arches on the north and south walls. The space measures 65 feet (20 m) long. The lobby floor is made of marble from Maryland, which was designed to resemble Athenian marble. The floor is made of marble mosaic tiles. The center of the floor has a panel with the theater's motif, a decorative letter "L" with foliate ornament around it. The walls contain a marble dado wrapping around the lobby, as well as piers topped by capitals with acanthus leaves. There are foliate moldings around each of the elliptical arches. The walls also have lighting sconces. The lobby's ceiling consists of a groin vault with a molded egg-and-dart border and decorative rosettes in the vault's ribs. There is a dome at the middle of the ceiling, with an egg-and-dart border, a hanging chandelier, and cove lights.

The south doors lead to the street, while the north doors lead to the auditorium. Above the north and south walls are three small canvas murals by James Wall Finn. The murals depict female figures on either side of portraits of Sarah Siddons and David Garrick. Above the center door on the north wall is a segmentally-arched pediment, supported on console brackets flanking the doorway; these pediments contain the "L" motif.

To the west and east are curving stairs leading up to the first balcony level. The staircases are covered in marble but are actually made of steel. The outer walls of the staircases contain marble dados, as well as bronze railings attached to them. The inside edges of the staircases have bronze balustrades with cast-iron and wrought-iron decorations, as well as newel posts containing nude figures. The east wall also has ticket windows. Another stair to the west leads down to the smoking room. At the balcony level was a foyer and smoking rooms.

==== Auditorium ====
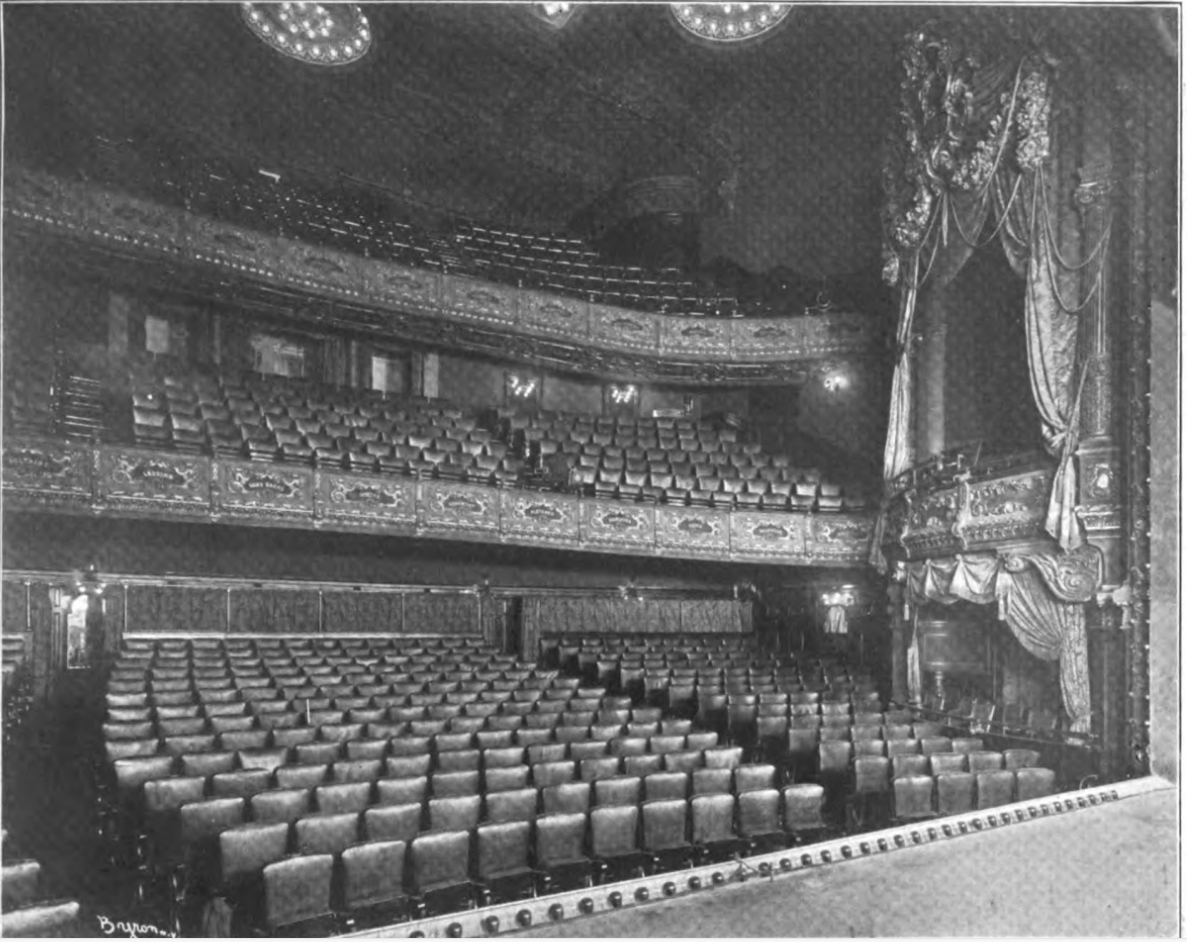
Auditorium

The auditorium has an orchestra level, boxes, two balconies, and a stage behind the proscenium arch. The auditorium's width is greater than its depth, and the space is designed with plaster decorations in high relief. The Lyceum's auditorium generally has plain plaster walls, and much of the decoration is concentrated on the proscenium and boxes. The juxtaposition of plain walls and ornamented openings was intended to draw the audience's attention toward the stage. The auditorium took up about one-third of the entire theater building.

The auditorium has 922 seats, making the Lyceum one of the smaller Broadway theaters. (Note: This has also been cited as 891 seats or 950 seats.) These are divided into 409 seats in the orchestra, 287 on the first balcony, and 210 on the second balcony, as well as 16 box seats. As designed, the seats were upholstered in dark yellow leather, which has since been replaced. Each seat measured 22 inches (560 mm) wide, larger than in comparable theaters. The backs of different rows of seats were spaced 38 inches (970 mm) apart. The large width of the auditorium compensated for the relatively small number of rows.

===== Seating areas =====
The rear (south) end of the orchestra contains a shallow promenade, which has wood-paneled walls, arched "L" motifs, and cartouches. The orchestra has a raked floor and painted wood paneling on the side walls. Above the paneling are ornamented pediments with foliate and egg-and-dart decorations. The orchestra level is wheelchair-accessible via the main doors, but the balcony levels can only be accessed by steps. Unusually for theaters of the time, the balconies are cantilevered from the structural framework, which obviated the need for columns that blocked audience views. The balcony levels have paneled wooden dados on both the side and rear walls; the first balcony has blind openings and cartouches. The balconies have foliate bands on their undersides, with light fixtures underneath. In front of the balconies are leaf moldings topped by brackets and foliate decoration. All three levels have sconces on the side walls.

On either side of the stage is a wall section with one box at the first balcony level. Each wall section consists of Ionic-style fluted and banded columns, which support an elliptical arch. The boxes themselves are supported on large brackets, which in turn rest above piers with foliate capitals. In front of each box is a curved railing with leaf moldings. There is a cartouche with an "L" motif atop the boxes' arches, and a swag shaped like a leaf is suspended from the cartouche.

===== Other design features =====
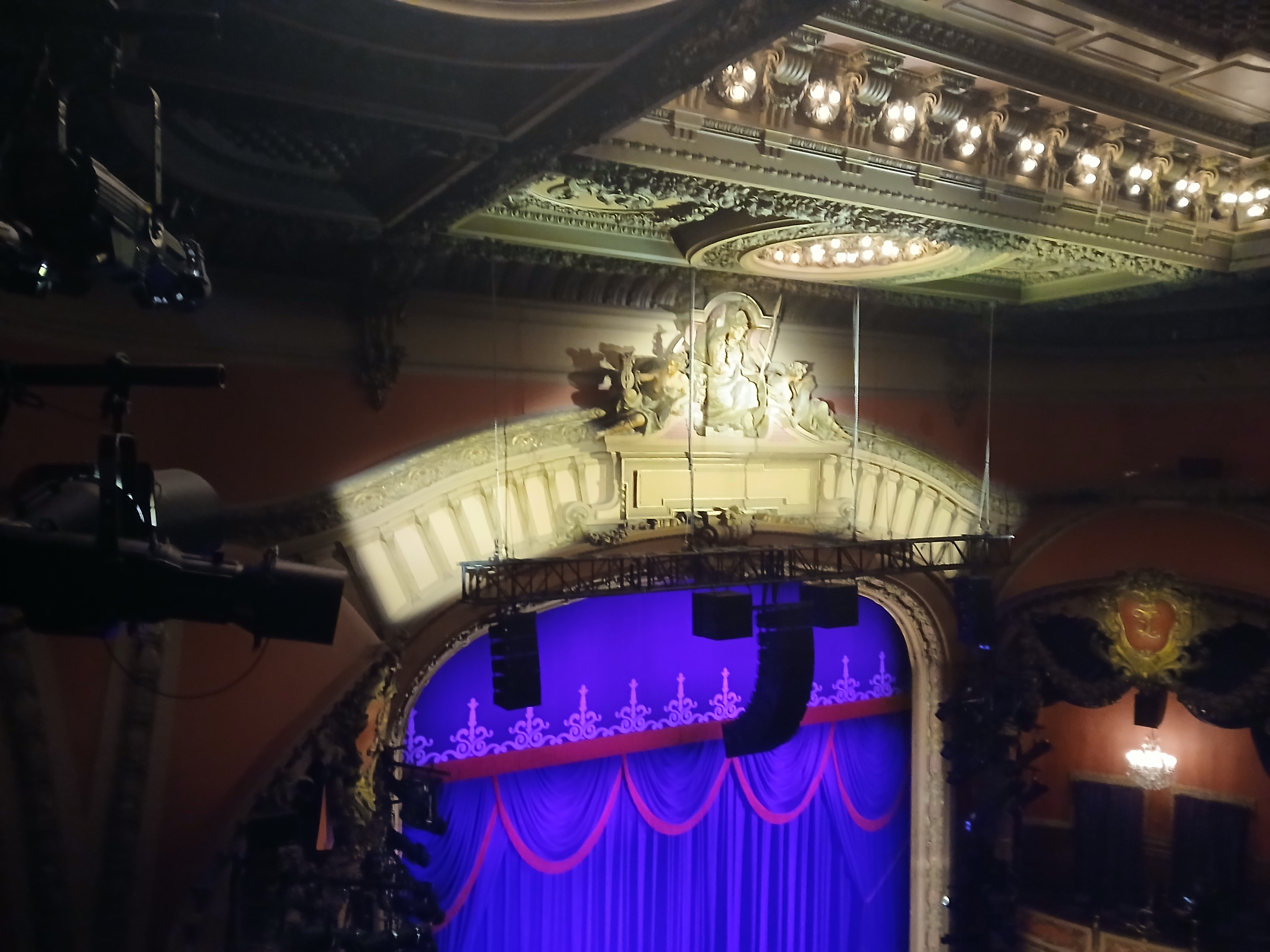
Proscenium arch, with decorations

The proscenium arch measures 33 feet 0 inches (10.06 m) high and 31 feet 8 inches (9.65 m) wide. (Note: The proscenium arch was historically cited as measuring 30 feet (9.1 m) high and either 30 feet or 35 feet (11 m) wide.) The proscenium arch consists of a wide, molded band with foliate and egg-and-dart decorations. Above the center of the arch is a console bracket with swags, above which is a broken pediment, as well as a pair of swag-filled console brackets on either side of the pediment. The broken pediment has a figure of Pallas Athene, which is flanked by female representations of drama and music. These figures were also carved by J. W. Finn.

The stage measures 37 feet (11 m) deep and 89 feet (27 m) wide. The depth of the stage could be increased by up to 40 feet (12 m). The stage contains a lift that could descend to 30 feet (9.1 m) below the auditorium. The lift, no longer operational, divided the stage into several sections. It could be used not only to raise and lower scenery, but also to create sets with terrain elements, such as cliffs, terraces, and rivers. The depth of the auditorium to the proscenium is 29 feet 6 inches (8.99 m), while the depth to the front of the stage is 31 feet 0 inches (9.45 m).

The coved ceiling is distinguished by console brackets with swags, and there are decorations of bellflowers within the cove. The ceiling is divided into ribs, containing bands with fruits and flowers. The center of the ceiling contains a rectangular panel with modillions around it, as well as floral cartouches and latticework inside. Around this panel are circular "L" motifs. Guilloche moldings hang over the second balcony. The ceiling lacked a chandelier, as the designers thought it would be distracting to the performers and audience. Instead, there are recessed light fixtures in the ceiling.

==== Other facilities ====
Daniel Frohman's "penthouse", comprising his office and apartment, was on the south side of the theater building, facing 45th Street. It was not part of his original plans but became his primary residence; he also had another residence in New York City. They were accessed by a stair and elevator from the lobby. Frohman's offices contained Chippendale furniture as well as a reproduction of playwright David Garrick's library. The adjacent rooms contained stenographers' offices and other rooms. A small window from his dining room's northern wall allowed Frohman to look at the performances in the auditorium. The window measured 18 inches (460 mm) wide and was above the second balcony level. During the mid-1920s, The New York Times described Frohman's office as, "in a manner, the headquarters of the theatrical profession in the city". The office contained portraits of numerous oil paintings, drawings, photographs, and lithographs of show personalities. Frohman's office also had a phone line for contacting the stage manager directly.

Frohman's offices were subsequently converted into the Shubert Archive, which contains the Shubert Organization's theatrical collection. The archive was organized in 1976 and opened at the Lyceum in 1986. Initially, it contained four million items from the Shuberts' history between 1900 and World War II, including 2,000 costume designs, 8,000 blueprints, and 12,000 manuscripts. There is also some space inside the mansard roof. Originally, this space included a large rehearsal room with its own stage, directly above the main auditorium. The room measured 80 feet (24 m) long and 40 feet (12 m) wide, and it had a miniature stage. In the basement were storage rooms, where sets originally could be swapped onto the movable stage.

The 46th Street annex housed the scene-painting studio, a carpenter shop, a costume department, and storage spaces, along with dressing rooms. The scene-painting studio faced the street, with natural light coming from the north, and could be used to paint up to four backdrops at a time. This room measured 35 feet (11 m) tall and 100 feet (30 m) deep, with a full-height glass wall facing north and slots in the floors. The carpentry shop could accommodate 25 workers. The costume department was housed in a separate room that could fit 50 seamstresses and a varying number of cutters. The storage spaces included a full storage warehouse as well as rooms to store scenery. According to contemporary media, the dressing rooms could fit 200 people. Each dressing room had a bathroom, and there were large rooms for supernumerary actors as well. The old scenery rooms have also become part of the Shubert Archive and contain artifacts such as librettos, orchestrations, and cash books.

== History ==
Times Square became the epicenter for large-scale theater productions between 1900 and the Great Depression. Manhattan's theater district had begun to shift from Union Square and Madison Square during the first decade of the 20th century. These venues were developed following the construction of the Empire Theatre on 41st Street in 1893 and Hammerstein's Olympia in 1895. The Lyceum, Hudson, and New Amsterdam, which all opened in 1903, were among the first theaters to make this shift; the Lyceum is one of the oldest surviving Broadway theaters. From 1901 to 1920, forty-three theaters were built around Broadway in Midtown Manhattan, including the current Lyceum.

=== Development ===
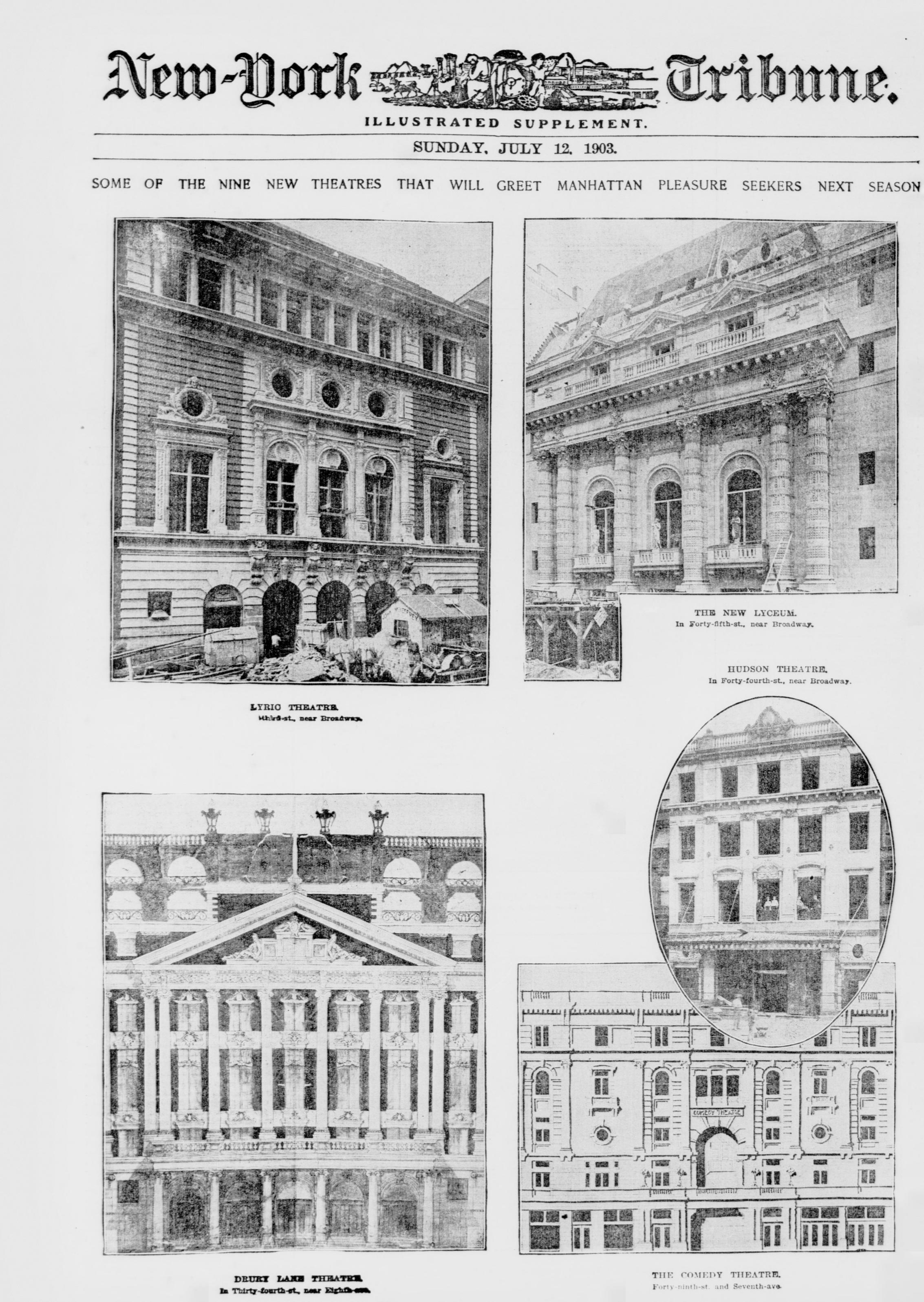
1903 New-York Tribune cover showing the development of some theaters in New York City, including the Lyceum (top right)

Daniel Frohman had operated an earlier Lyceum Theatre on Fourth Avenue, near Madison Square, which had been built in 1885 by Steele MacKaye. Metropolitan Life acquired the old Lyceum in 1902 to make way for the Metropolitan Life Insurance Company Tower, and Frohman sought to develop a new venue further north. In February 1902, shortly after the old Lyceum was acquired, Frohman announced he had purchased six lots on 45th and 46th Streets near Times Square. He planned to build a 900-seat theater on the site after the leases on the lots expired. Frohman chose the site specifically because it was on a less crowded side street while also being close to the then-under-construction New York City Subway. The auditorium would be on 45th Street, while a narrow wing with mechanical equipment and dressing rooms would be placed on 46th Street. The site cost Frohman $110,000, and he expected to spend another $230,000 on the new Lyceum Theatre.

Frohman hired Herts & Tallant to design the new theater, while the Fuller Construction Company was hired as the general contractor. The old Lyceum ultimately closed on March 22, 1902. Work on the new theater began on April 1, a week after the old Lyceum was closed. The cornerstone was laid on October 16, 1902. Frohman, who considered 13 to be a lucky number, placed thirteen of the old Lyceum's bricks into the new theater. By then, the basement and cellar were largely complete and the theater was to be completed early the following year.

The theater was supposed to open in September 1903 but encountered so many delays that the inaugural play, The Proud Prince, could only be scheduled at the Lyceum for two weeks. Daniel Frohman, his brother Charles Frohman, and William Harris formed the New Lyceum Theatre Company and divided ownership of the Lyceum equally. Instead of distributing stock, the company issued six promissory notes of $118,328 each, which could not be collected for as long as each partner lived.

=== Frohman operation ===
==== Early years ====
The new Lyceum Theatre (also formally capitalized as the New Lyceum Theatre) opened on November 2, 1903, with The Proud Prince. E. H. Sothern, who starred in The Proud Prince, had also appeared in the first production that Frohman had shown at the old Lyceum. At the theater's opening, an architectural publication praised the theater's design as "being intended for a high-class dramatic performance before a refined and cultured audience". Conversely, because of its relatively remote location, the New-York Tribune said that there were "many who refused to believe that a theater so far up town would be successful". Charles Frohman was the theater's first manager. From its inception, the new Lyceum was intended as a venue for "drawing-room comedies".

Three weeks after the theater's opening, The Admirable Crichton premiered at the new Lyceum. The play The Other Girl and Granny appeared at the Lyceum in 1904, as did Mrs. Leffingwell's Boots and A Doll's House in 1905. The most successful production in the Lyceum's initial years was the drama The Lion and the Mouse, which opened in 1905 and ran for 686 performances. Daniel Frohman's wife Margaret Illington appeared at some productions in the Lyceum. beginning with Mrs. Leffingwell's Boots and The Thief (1907). Frohman would gesture through the window from his office to signify when Illington was overacting. Actresses such as Ethel Barrymore, Billie Burke, Ina Claire, and Lenore Ulric also performed at the Lyceum in its early years. Burke starred or co-starred in some plays during the Lyceum's first decade, including Love Watches in 1908, Mrs. Dot and Suzanne in 1910, and The Runaway in 1911. The Lyceum also hosted the U.S. premiere of the French silent film The Loves of Queen Elizabeth, featuring Sarah Bernhardt, in 1912. Barrymore, meanwhile, was featured in Our Mrs. McChesney (1915).

==== Belasco partnership ====
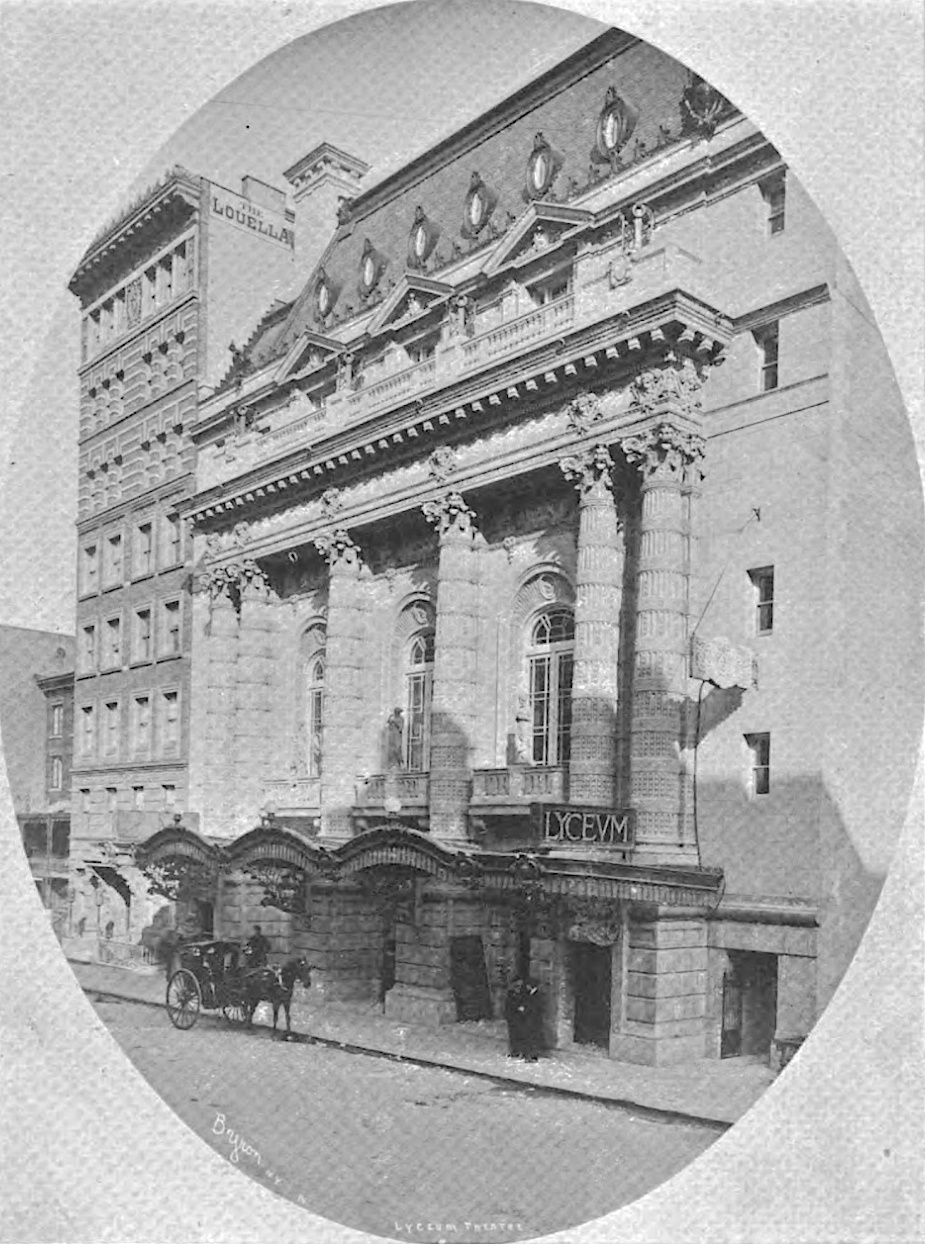
Early depiction of the theater

Charles Frohman died in May 1915 during the sinking of the RMS Lusitania, and his company, which had an ownership stake in the Lyceum, was subsequently acquired by Paramount Pictures. David Belasco announced in March 1916 that he would become one of the managers of the Lyceum Theatre. Contemporary media said the move was borne out of sentimental considerations, as Belasco had frequently collaborated with Charles Frohman. Among the major productions at the Lyceum in the late 1910s were Tiger Rose (1917), featuring Lenore Ulric; Daddies (1918), featuring Jeanne Eagels and George Abbott; and The Gold Diggers (1919), featuring Ina Claire. These shows all had several hundred performances, including The Gold Diggers, which had 720 performances. In addition, the theater held events such as a charity dinner for the Actors' National Memorial Fund in 1919. Frohman administered the Actors' Fund from his office.

The Lyceum hosted many romantic comedies and other successful productions in the 1920s. Frohman leased the theater to Famous Players–Lasky, which was to present Belasco's works there for ten years starting in October 1921. The same year, the theater hosted The Easiest Way with Frances Starr, as well as The Grand Duke with Lionel Atwill and Lina Abarbanell. The Lyceum's stage and decorations were restored in 1922, prior to the opening of Shore Leave, which featured Starr and James Rennie. The Lyceum also hosted revivals of classical plays, including The Merchant of Venice (1922), The School for Scandal (1923), and Antony and Cleopatra (1924). During 1925, the theater hosted The Grand Duchess and the Waiter, with Elsie Ferguson and Basil Rathbone, and the romantic comedy Naughty Cinderella, with Irène Bordoni.

In the late 1920s, the Lyceum hosted productions such as the comedy Fanny (1926) with Fanny Brice and Elmer the Great (1928) with Walter Huston. The decade ended with the 1929 romance Berkeley Square, which had over 200 performances. Frohman and Belasco's partnership ended when Belasco died in May 1931 after a long illness. The lease on the theater was set to expire later that year, and Frohman planned to rent the Lyceum as an independent playhouse. By then, Frohman was no longer an active producer.

=== Great Depression and ownership changes ===
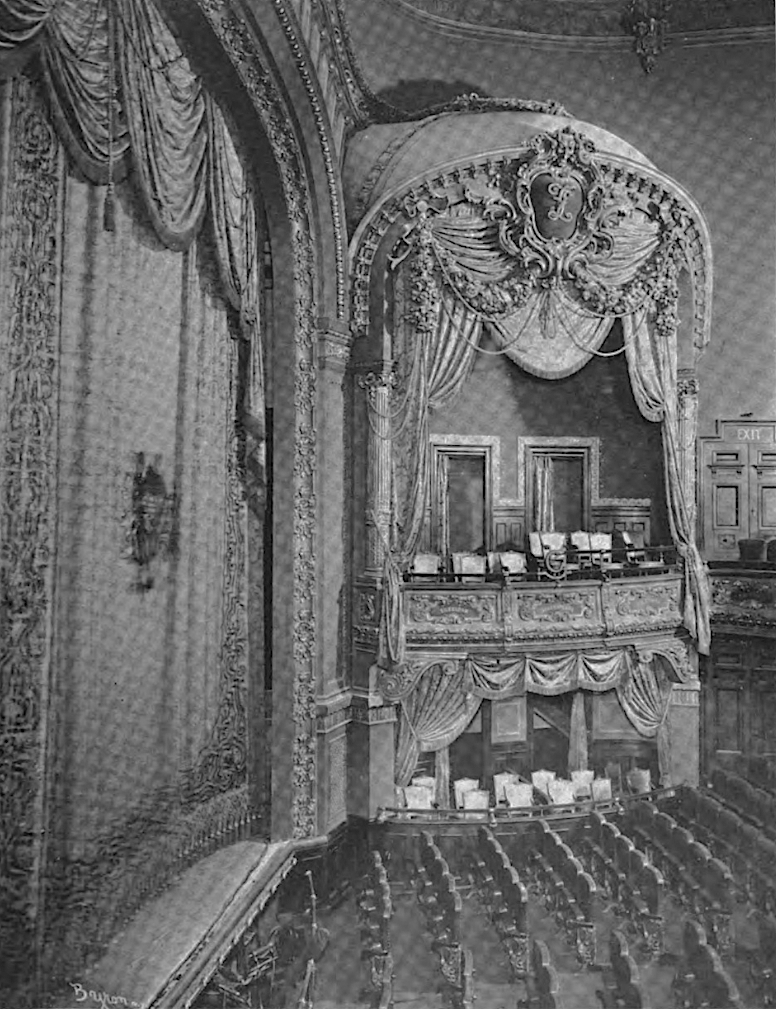
View of the boxes

The Lyceum Theatre suffered in general because of the Great Depression, and most shows generally closed after a small number of performances. Among the longer productions was Payment Deferred (1931), which had 70 performances, as well as Sailor, Beware! (1933), which had 500 performances. In 1934, the theater hosted Ode to Liberty, featuring Ina Claire. The Bowery Savings Bank moved to foreclose on a mortgage loan on the theater in mid-1935. Later that year, the Lyceum was leased for one year to Julius Stone for a presentation of Squaring the Circle. The next year, Frohman leased most of the theater, except for his own offices, to Spencer D. Bettelheim of the Lyco Company for five years. Contemporary newspapers said the lease to Bettelheim was "a sentimental gesture", since Bettelheim's father was Frohman's old friend. Bettelheim then announced a renovation of the interior, including new seats.

Long-running productions during the late 1930s included Pre-Honeymoon (1936) with Jessie Royce Landis; St. Helena (1936) with Maurice Evans; and Having Wonderful Time (1937) with John Garfield and Katherine Locke. The theater was less financially stable after the Lyco Company dissolved in 1938. By March 1939, the Bowery Savings Bank was foreclosing on the Lyceum, which was in danger of demolition. After Stanley Howe, a friend of Frohman's and an aide to mayor Fiorello La Guardia, intervened, the bank promised that Frohman could stay in his apartment for the rest of his life. The Lyceum was leased to Victor Payne-Jennings that April, on the condition that Frohman be allowed to keep his residence. The Bowery Savings Bank acquired the theater at a foreclosure auction in December 1939 for $100,000. Shortly afterward, Samuel Briskman leased the theater and used it to show When We Are Married.

In May 1940, the Bowery Savings Bank announced it would sell the Lyceum to a syndicate that included playwright George S. Kaufman, producer Max Gordon, and playwright Moss Hart for $250,000. Frohman was to be allowed to live in the apartment above the theater for $1 per year, though Frohman died in December 1940, less than a year afterward. Among the syndicate's first works at the Lyceum was George Washington Slept Here in 1940, as well as The Beautiful People and Junior Miss in 1941. This was followed by The Doughgirls, which had 671 performances, and The Late George Apley, which had 384 performances. The Lyceum then hosted Born Yesterday, which opened in 1946 and was the theater's longest-running production with 1,642 performances. Born Yesterday was transferred out of the Lyceum mid-run in 1948 and was followed by "a half-dozen flops".

The Gordon syndicate agreed to sell the Lyceum to Harry Gould in April 1949 for $400,000, after having previously failed to sell the theater to Gould at twice that price. (Note: Botto & Mitchell 2002, p. 22 says the sale took place in 1945, but contemporary media contradict this.) The sale was not finalized until that December, when the price had increased to $450,000. The first major production in the 1950s was the original The Country Girl, which opened in 1950. Melvyn Douglas then appeared in two successful comedies: Glad Tidings in 1951 and Time Out for Ginger in 1952.

=== Shubert operation ===
==== 1950s to 1970s ====
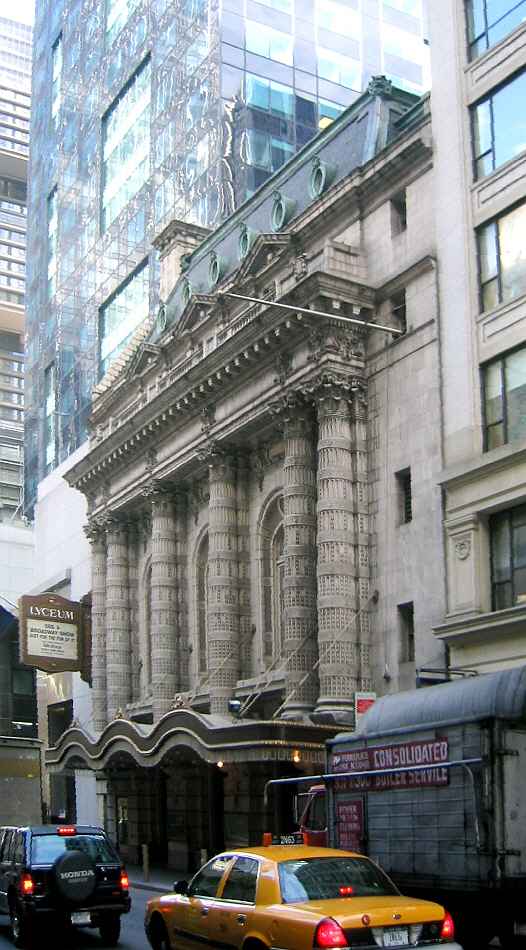
Seen from the east

The New York Times reported in 1952 that the Shubert Organization had taken over the Lyceum. During 1954, the theater hosted the comedy King of Hearts and the romance drama Anastasia, both of which ran for over 200 performances. This was followed by A Hatful of Rain (1955), The Happiest Millionaire (1956), and Look Back in Anger (1957). Notable productions of the late 1950s also included The Gazebo in 1958 and The Billy Barnes Revue in 1959. Subsequently, the Lyceum showed the British dramas A Taste of Honey in 1960 and The Caretaker in 1961. The Lyceum then had several short-lived works before showing Nobody Loves an Albatross in 1963.

The Association of Producing Artists (APA) and Phoenix Theatre showed their productions at the Lyceum from 1965 to 1969. In March 1965, the Shuberts leased the theater to the partnership of APA and Phoenix for $100,000 a year, which the lessees considered a nominal fee. The APA and Phoenix originally did not have enough money to transfer their works to the Lyceum for the 1965–1966 season, but ultimately it opened a revival of the play You Can't Take It with You at the Lyceum in November 1965. During the APA-Phoenix era, the Lyceum hosted classical revivals such as War and Peace, The Show-Off, The Cherry Orchard, The Cocktail Party, The Misanthrope, and Hamlet. The Lyceum also operated as a repertory theatre for films in mid-1968. The APA and Phoenix dissolved their partnership in early 1969 due to a lack of funding. Afterward, the theater hosted plays such as Three Men on a Horse.

There were few successful productions at the Lyceum during the 1970s, amid a decline in the Broadway theatrical industry. Among the longer runs in this era were the 1970 play Borstal Boy and the 1976 play Your Arms Too Short to Box with God. Phoenix also hosted some of its works at the Lyceum. During the early 1970s, Daniel Frohman's niece-in-law petitioned the New York City Landmarks Preservation Commission (LPC) to protect the Lyceum as a city landmark. The LPC designated the theater's facade, but not its interior, as an official city landmark in 1974, requiring the LPC to review and approve all proposed modifications to the facade. Gerald Schoenfeld of the Shubert Organization had opposed the landmark status, believing the small theater to be a liability. A landmark plaque was installed on the facade in 1978. Major productions during the late 1970s included Cold Storage in 1977 and Wings in 1979.

==== 1980s and 1990s ====
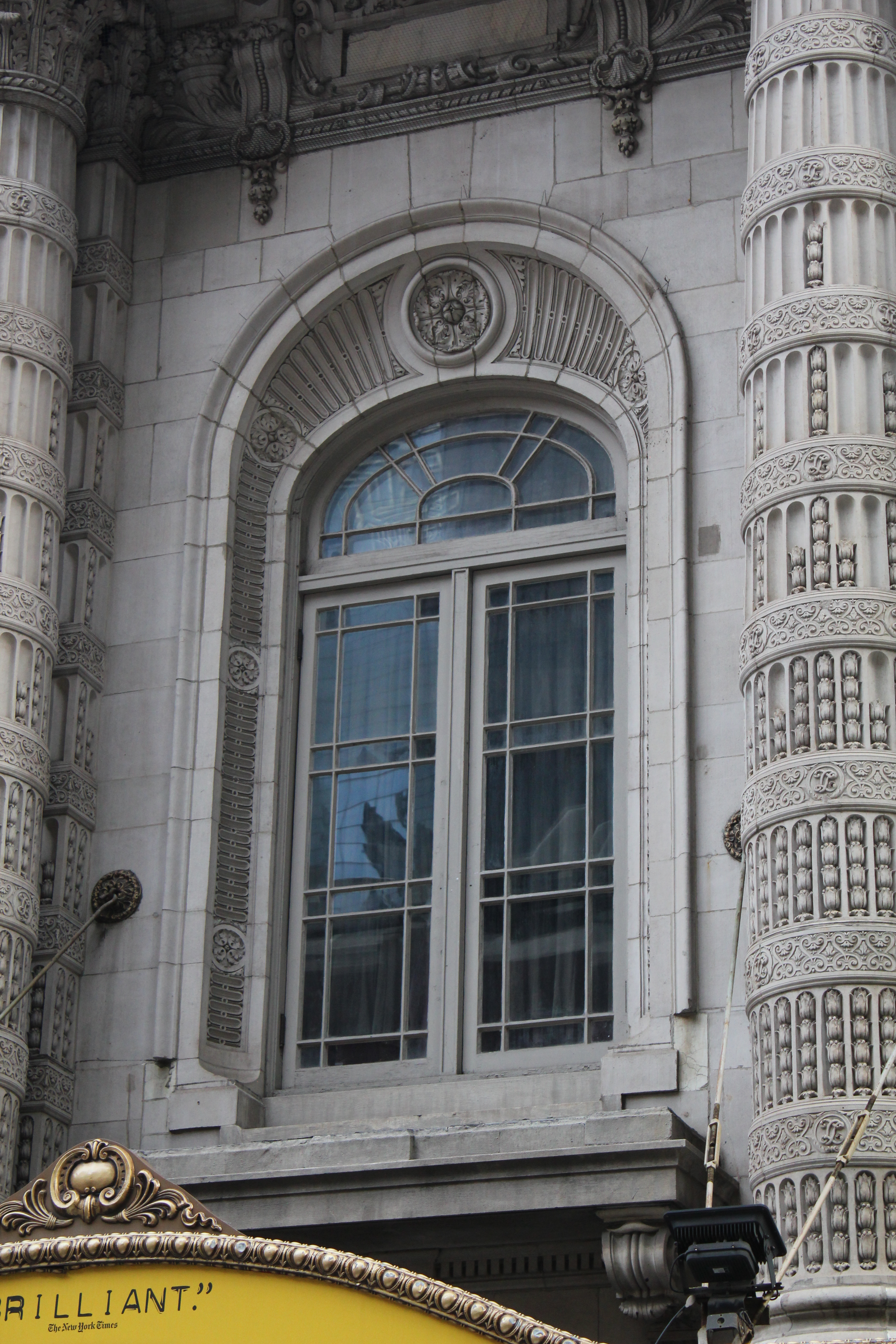
Detail of one of the arched windows on the facade

The Lyceum hosted a revival of Morning's at Seven in 1980. The theater then hosted productions such as "Master Harold"...and the Boys (1982), The Man Who Had Three Arms (1983), a set of monologues by comedian Whoopi Goldberg in 1984, and As Is (1985). The LPC gave the Shuberts permission to replace the facade marquee in 1986 after the original marquee began to fall apart. According to Schoenfeld, the Shuberts had to pay $350,000 to replace the marquee due to the commission's demands, though the highest bid was only about $150,000 and the theater was often unoccupied. The Shubert Archive also opened in 1986. In the dozen years after 1987, the Lyceum was idle for about 70 percent of the time. To increase the occupancy of the Lyceum and other little-used Broadway theaters, the League of American Theaters and Producers negotiated with Broadway unions and guilds during the late 1980s. Among the shows of the late 1980s were the 1986 puppet show A Little Like Magic, as well as Safe Sex (1987) and Our Town (1988). During the 1980s, the Shuberts renovated the Lyceum as part of a restoration program for their Broadway theaters.

After the Lyceum's facade was successfully designated as a landmark, the LPC started considering a similar protection for the interior in 1982, with discussions continuing over the next several years. The Lyceum was designated as an interior landmark on December 8, 1987. This was part of the LPC's wide-ranging effort in 1987 to grant landmark status to Broadway theaters. The New York City Board of Estimate ratified the designations in March 1988. The Shuberts, the Nederlanders, and Jujamcyn collectively sued the LPC in June 1988 to overturn the landmark designations of 22 theaters, including the Lyceum's interior, (Note: The exterior designation was not contested.) on the merit that the designations severely limited the extent to which the theaters could be modified. The lawsuit was escalated to the New York Supreme Court and the Supreme Court of the United States, but these designations were ultimately upheld in 1992.

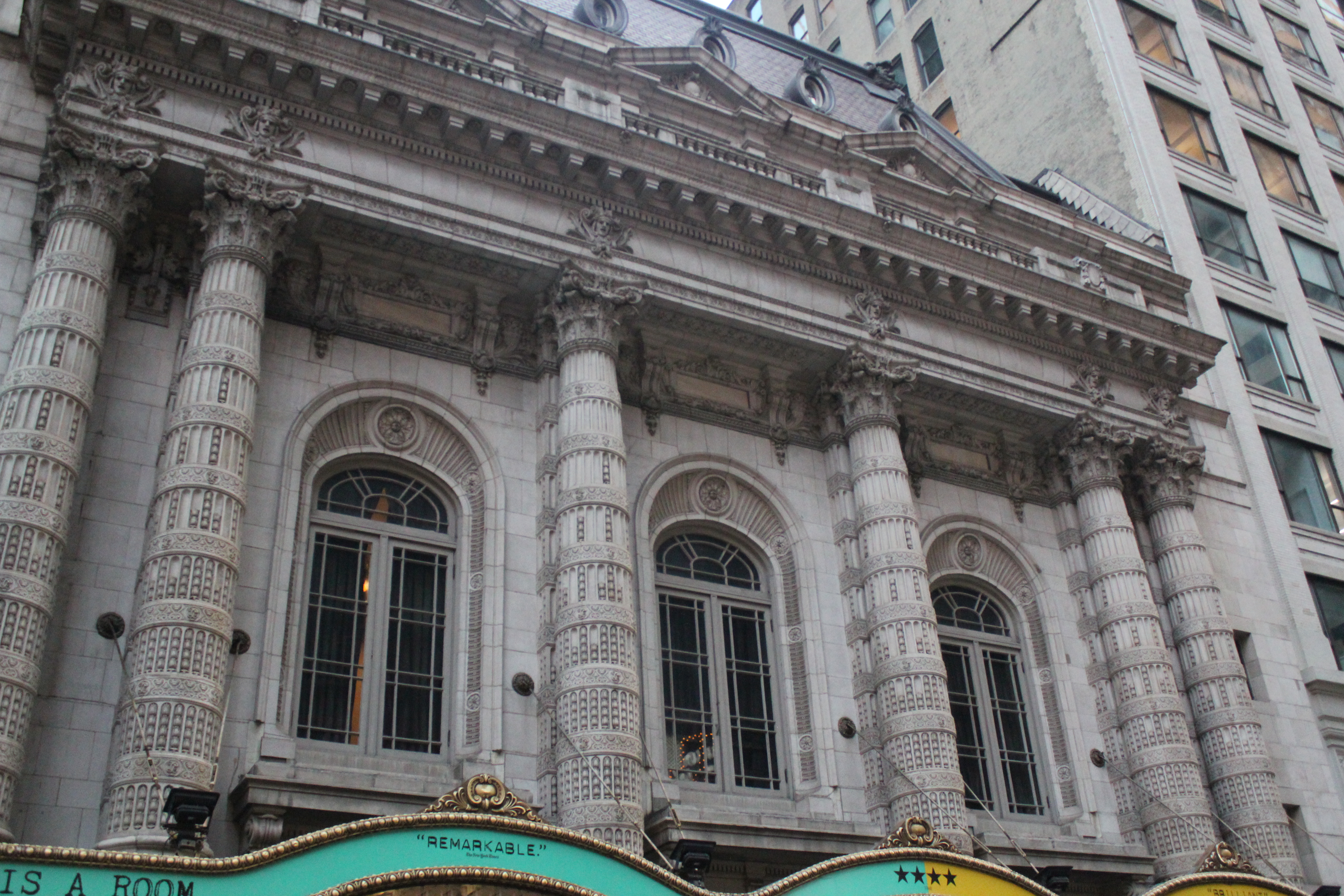
Seen from across 45th Street

The National Actors Theatre, led by Tony Randall, announced in 1992 that it would relocate from the Belasco to the Lyceum, despite the smaller size of the latter. The Lyceum was used by the National Actors Theatre for most of the 1990s, but most of its productions were unsuccessful. The first season of the National Actors Theatre opened with performances of The Seagull, Saint Joan, and Three Men on a Horse. The National Actors Theatre went on to host Timon of Athens, The Government Inspector, and The Flowering Peach in 1994; Gentlemen Prefer Blondes and The School for Scandal in 1995; and The Gin Game and The Sunshine Boys in 1997. Additionally, the actor Mandy Patinkin performed a limited engagement at the Lyceum in March 1997. The National Actors Theatre closed out the 1990s with the plays Night Must Fall and The Lonesome West in 1999.

During the late 1980s, the Shubert Organization had leased 124,000 square feet (11,500 m^{2}) of the site's unused air development rights. German firm Bertelsmann used the air rights to increase the height of the adjacent skyscraper at 1540 Broadway, paying $600,000 a year. The Shuberts had to maintain the Lyceum as a legitimate theater as part of the agreement concerning the theater's air rights. Bertelsmann had an option to buy the theater, raising concerns that the archives in the theater would have to be relocated. In 1999, there was a dispute over whether Spirit of Broadway, a theatrical museum with a 60-minute play targeted at tourists, should be produced at the Lyceum. Bertelsmann supported Spirit of Broadway, but Schoenfeld said it did not fall under the criteria for legitimate shows. Spirit of Broadway was ultimately determined to be legitimate.

==== 2000s to present ====
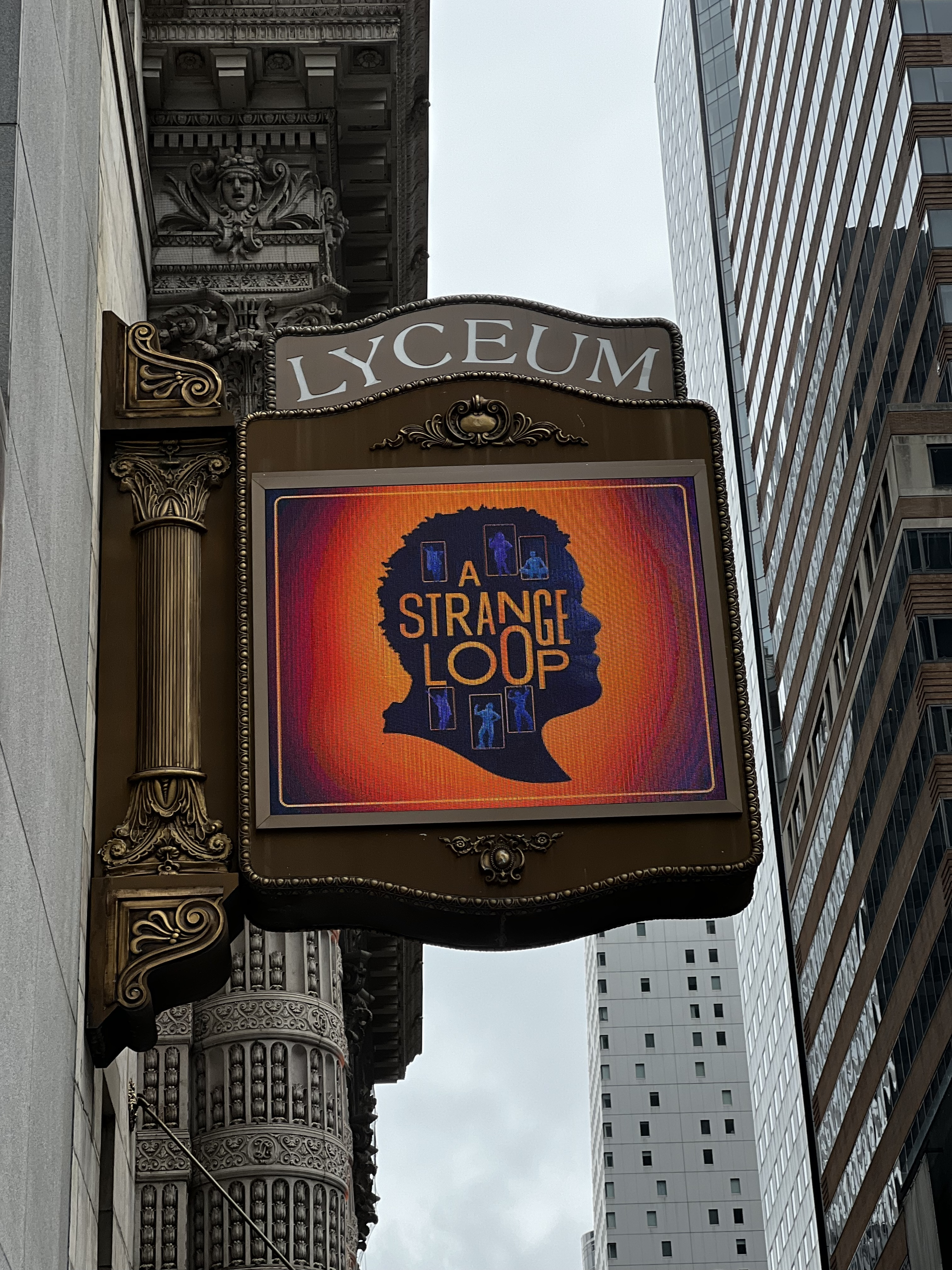
Sign outside the theater in 2022

After the National Actors Theatre stopped producing at the Lyceum, the theater hosted Rose in 2000, a solo play with Olympia Dukakis. Subsequently, the Lyceum hosted productions such as The Invention of Love in 2001, The Play What I Wrote and I Am My Own Wife in 2003, and The Lieutenant of Inishmore in 2006. As part of a settlement with the United States Department of Justice in 2003, the Shuberts agreed to improve disabled access at their 16 landmarked Broadway theaters, including the Lyceum. The theater also hosted solo performances by the magician Marc Salem and the actor and comedian Whoopi Goldberg during 2004 and early 2005. The roof and 45th Street facade were repaired in 2005 as part of a $1 million renovation. During the late 2000s, the Lyceum hosted plays and musicals such as Inherit the Wind, Is He Dead?, Macbeth, [title of show], Reasons to Be Pretty, and In the Next Room (or The Vibrator Play).

The Lyceum Theatre hosted numerous shows in the 2010s as well. These included Looped and The Scottsboro Boys (opened in 2010), Venus in Fur (2012), The Nance (2013), The Realistic Joneses and Disgraced (2014), The Visit and A View from the Bridge (2015), Fully Committedand Oh, Hello (2016), The Play That Goes Wrong (2017), and Be More Chill and A Christmas Carol (2019). In addition, the NBC television series Smash used the theater in 2012 as the home of their fictional musical Bombshell. The theater closed on March 12, 2020, due to the COVID-19 pandemic. It reopened on October 11, 2021, with Is This A Room and Dana H. playing in repertory.

A Strange Loop opened at the Lyceum in April 2022 and ran until January 2023. This was followed in May 2023 by the play Grey House, which ran for two months. The play My Son's a Queer (But What Can You Do?) was expected to open at the Lyceum in March 2024 for a three-month run, but it was postponed to the 2024–2025 season with new dates and a new theater. Subsequently, the off-Broadway play Oh, Mary! transferred to the Lyceum in July 2024.

== Notable productions ==
Productions are listed by the year of their first performance.

=== 1900s to 1990s ===
Notable productions at the theater
Opening year	Name	Refs.
1903	The Admirable Crichton	
1904	David Garrick	
1905	A Doll's House	
1907	The Truth	
1909	Arsène Lupin	
1909	Penelope	
1910	The Pillars of Society	
1910	The Assumption of Hannele	
1910	The Importance of Being Earnest	
1913	The Ghost Breaker	
1915	John Gabriel Borkman	
1917	The Great Divide	
1917	The Case of Lady Camber	
1919	The Gold Diggers	
1922	The Merchant of Venice	
1923	The School for Scandal	
1924	Antony and Cleopatra	
1924	Ladies of the Evening	
1926	The Sport of Kings	
1929	Berkeley Square	
1931	Anatol	
1935	Squaring the Circle	
1936	St. Helena	
1939	The Mother	
1939	When We Are Married	
1941	Junior Miss	
1942	The Doughgirls	
1946	Born Yesterday	
1950	The Enchanted	
1950	The Country Girl	
1952	Anna Christie	
1952	Time Out For Ginger	
1955	A Hatful of Rain	
1957	Look Back in Anger	
1958	The Gazebo	
1959	The Billy Barnes Revue	
1959	Flowering Cherry	
1959	Goodbye Charlie	
1960	A Taste of Honey	
1960	The Importance of Being Oscar	
1960	Mandingo	
1961	The Caretaker	
1963	Ages of Man	
1963	Nobody Loves an Albatross	
1965	Entertaining Mr. Sloane	
1965, 1967	You Can't Take It With You	(Note: You Can't Take It With You was first shown in 1965 and reopened in 1967.)
1966	The School for Scandal	
1967	The Wild Duck	
1967	By George	
1967, 1968	The Show-off	(Note: The Show-off was first shown in 1967 and reopened in 1968.)
1968	Exit the King	
1968	The Cherry Orchard	
1968	The Cocktail Party	
1968	The Misanthrope	
1969	Cock-a-Doodle Dandy	
1969	Hamlet	
1969	Three Men on a Horse	
1970	Norman, Is That You?	
1970	Borstal Boy	
1971	The School for Wives	
1972	The Great God Brown and Don Juan	(Note: The Great God Brown and Don Juan were performed in repertory.)
1973	Out Cry	
1975	The Lieutenant	
1976	Something's Afoot	
1976	Best Friend	
1976	Your Arms Too Short to Box with God	
1979	Wings	
1980	Morning's at Seven	
1982	"Master Harold"...and the Boys	
1983	The Man Who Had Three Arms	
1985	As Is	
1988	Our Town	
1993	Saint Joan	
1993	Three Men on a Horse	
1993	Timon of Athens	
1994	The Government Inspector	
1994	The Flowering Peach	
1995	Gentlemen Prefer Blondes	
1995	The School for Scandal	
1997	The Gin Game	
1997	The Sunshine Boys	
1999	Night Must Fall	
1999	The Lonesome West	

=== 2000s to present ===
Notable productions at the theater
Opening year	Name	Refs.
2001	The Invention of Love	
2002	Morning's at Seven	
2003	The Play What I Wrote	
2003	I Am My Own Wife	
2005	Steel Magnolias	
2005	Souvenir	
2006	The Lieutenant of Inishmore	
2007	Inherit the Wind	
2007	Is He Dead?	
2008	Macbeth	
2008	[title of show]	
2009	Reasons to Be Pretty	
2009	In the Next Room (or The Vibrator Play)	
2010	Looped	
2010	The Scottsboro Boys	
2012	Venus in Fur	
2013	The Nance	
2014	The Realistic Joneses	
2014	Disgraced	
2015	The Visit	
2015	A View from the Bridge	
2016	Fully Committed	
2016	Oh, Hello	
2017	The Play That Goes Wrong	
2019	Be More Chill	
2019	A Christmas Carol	
2021	Is This a Room and Dana H.	(Note: Is This a Room and Dana H. were performed in repertory.)
2022	A Strange Loop	
2023	Grey House	
2024	Oh, Mary!	

== Box office record ==
Macbeth previously set the Lyceum Theatre's box-office record with a gross of US$584,033 over seven performances in 2008. Be More Chill beat the seven-performance box-office record in 2019, grossing US$738,384, while Oh, Hello set an eight-performance record of US$804,513 during the week ending January 22, 2017. A Strange Loop broke the eight-performance record during its final week in January 2023, grossing US$955,590. The play Oh, Mary! broke the box office record several times. As of 2025, Oh, Mary! held the eight-performance and overall records for the theater, grossing US$1,354,840.50 for the week ending June 13, 2025; it is the first production at the theater to gross more than one million dollars in a single week.

== See also ==
- List of Broadway theaters
- List of New York City Designated Landmarks in Manhattan from 14th to 59th Streets
