= The Man Who Had Three Arms =

Play written by Edward Albee

Playbill cover of 1983 Broadway production

The Man Who Had Three Arms is a two-act play for three actors by Edward Albee. The play ran briefly on Broadway in 1983.

== Overview ==
The play takes place in a theatre where the main character Himself is about to speak to the assembled group about his life of celebrity as "The Man Who Had Three Arms". The other two actors of the play, The Man and The Woman, play, variously, two people who are introducing Himself, the parents and wife of Himself, and the manager of Himself. In the first act, Himself describes his transformation from a successful family man to a person who is horrified to discover that a third arm is growing from between his shoulder blades. In the second act, Himself describes being on the celebrity circuit and all that entails—“money, sex, adulation”—while he grows more and more in debt. His wife leaves him. He falls apart in front of the audience only to deal with a final surprise.

The play contains harsh satire of the Catholic Church, the excesses of the culture of celebrity, and the shallowness of parent/child relationships, and involves some interaction between the lead character and the audience. It also contains quite a bit of humor and occasional vulgar language. The third arm may be a metaphor for the discovery and development of genius or talent in an otherwise unremarkable individual.

== Productions ==
The play was commissioned for the New World Festival of the Arts in Miami, Florida. The play premiered at the Coconut Grove Playhouse, Florida, in June 1982. Directed by Albee, the cast was Robert Drivas, Patricia Kilgarriff, and William Prince.

The play had a tryout at the Goodman Theatre, Chicago in October 1982, with Drivas, Kilgarriff, and Wyman Pendleton.

The play premiered on Broadway at the Lyceum Theatre on April 5, 1983, and closed on April 17, 1983, after 8 previews and 16 performances. Directed by Albee the cast featured Robert Drivas as "Himself", Patricia Kilgarriff as "The Woman" and William Prince as "The Man".

The play was presented in Albright College, Reading, Pennsylvania, in November 1988. It was directed by Dr. Lynn Morrow and starred Edward Fernandez. (Mr. Albee was in residence during the production period.) Dr. Morrow then presented the production in Edinburgh, Scotland, in August 1989, where it won a "Fringe First" award.

== Critical response ==
Reviewing the play from Miami for The Boston Phoenix, Carolyn Clay remarked that "The Man Who Had Three Arms, though well written and bristlingly caustic, is less interesting as a theater piece than as a statement on Albee and what, at 54, he thinks about himself, his career, and his critics. ... It is not impossible that if Albee were to divide this harangue into that which we should pay to hear and that which he should pay a competent professional to listen to, he might come up with a coruscating one-act play."

Frank Rich reviewing the production for The New York Times wrote that it "isn't a play - it's a temper tantrum in two acts... One of the more shocking lapses of Mr. Albee's writing is that he makes almost no attempt even to pretend that Himself is anything other than a maudlin stand-in for himself, with the disappearing arm representing an atrophied talent."

The Christian Science Monitor reviewer wrote: "The Man Who Had Three Arms could well be the bitter complaint of a playwright whose earlier great success has been followed by a wounding decline in popular and critical response. In this respect, the play is a sad spectacle. Yet it offers passages of eloquence and emotional power. Furthermore, in attacking the world, Himself has been well armed with the Albee arsenal of articulate attack weapons."

The play ran for only 16 performances, at least one of which was booed during the curtain call. Albee did not have another new play performed in New York City for the next 11 years. He would later insist that, of his many plays, The Man Who Had Three Arms was "the most excoriated of all (by critics, not by audiences)" yet it "remains one of my favorites."
