= Marriage Play =

Marriage Play is a drama for two actors by Edward Albee. The play premiered at Vienna's English Theatre in 1987.

== Productions ==
Marriage Play had its world premiere at Vienna's English Theatre, Vienna, Austria on May 17, 1987. The play was commissioned by the English Theatre. The cast was Kathleen Butler (Gillian) and Tom Klunis (Jack).

Marriage Play had its United States premiere at the Alley Theatre, Houston, Texas, on January 8, 1992, in a co-production with the McCarter Theatre, Princeton, New Jersey. The play premiered on the East Coast at the McCarter Theatre in February 1992. Directed by Albee, the cast was Tom Klunis (Jack) and Shirley Knight (Gillian).

Marriage Play was produced Off-Broadway by the Signature Theatre Company, running from October 1, 1993, to October 31, 1993. Directed by James Houghton, the cast was Kathleen Butler (Gillian) and Tom Klunis (Jack).

The play was produced in London at the National Theatre, Cottesloe Theatre, in a double bill with Finding the Sun, in May 2001. The cast was Bill Paterson and Sheila Gish, with the setting in Richmond, Surrey.

Cesear's Forum, Cleveland's minimalist theatre company, presented the play at Playhouse Square in an April/May 2009 production with Dana Hart and Julia Kolibab.

== Overview ==
The play opens with a blow. Jack informs his wife that, after thirty years of marriage, he intends to leave. Gillian does not react as he would expect; therefore he enters three times more. Gillian's answers make him angry. Finally Jack collapses on a chair. After expressing his frustration and insecurity, he learns that Gillian keeps critical notes on their lovemaking; he becomes even more paralyzed.

Gillian and Jack, like George and Martha in Who's Afraid of Virginia Woolf?, play ritual games to express and contain their sense of life-disappointment. In the middle of the play, the couple starts fighting with each other, clawing, punching and biting, even after they fall on the floor.

Exhausted by the fighting, they start to talk about the memorable times in their life. However, Gillian is determined to return to the previous insults and tells Jack he is not the only one who was unfaithful to his partner.

== Critical response ==
The reviewer for the Phoenix New Times wrote of a 2008 production directed by Kathleen Butler (the original Gillian): Marriage Play is essentially a far less sophisticated update on Albee's George and Martha, the historically high-strung hotheads of his 'Who's Afraid of Virginia Woolf?' Like George and Martha, Jack and Gillian... are disappointed in their post-middle-age lives. Also like George and Martha, they don't speak to one another; they bellow. They don't communicate; they play-act, staging and restaging the same scene (in which Jack attempts to abandon his wife) until they (and we) are happily exhausted... Butler's directorial stamp is all over this, and her deep knowledge of Albee's work allows us to hear clearly his peculiar rhythms, to see how he — and the people in this marriage play — envisions life as an act in an often-dreary theatrical story."
