= Home Movies (musical) =

- Music: Al Carmines
- Lyrics: Rosalyn Drexler
- Book: Rosalyn Drexler
- Productions: 1964 Off-Off-Broadway
- Awards: 1964 Obie Award

Home Movies is a one-act musical written by Rosalyn Drexler, with lyrics by Drexler and music by Al Carmines. The musical ran Off-Off-Broadway in 1964 and won the Obie Award, Distinguished Plays and Best Music.

== Productions ==
The original production of Home Movies ran for three weekends, from March 20, 1964 until March 30, 1964 at the Judson Poets' Theater, located at Judson Memorial Church in Greenwich Village. The cast included Al Carmines as Father Shenanigan, Sudie Bond as Vivienne, Fred Herko as Peter Peterouter, and Barbara Ann Teer as Violet.

Actor and comedian Orson Bean produced a second run of the show at the Off-Broadway Provincetown Playhouse, beginning May 11, 1964, and running for 72 performances. Bean had met the show's writer, Rosalyn Drexler, through a school he founded, and accepted an invitation from her to see the show during its original run. He liked it so much he took an option on it the next day and tapped friends to be investors. While this production opened with the same cast as the original, starting May 26 Orson Bean took over the role of Father Shenanigan.
