= Edward Albee =

American playwright (1928–2016)

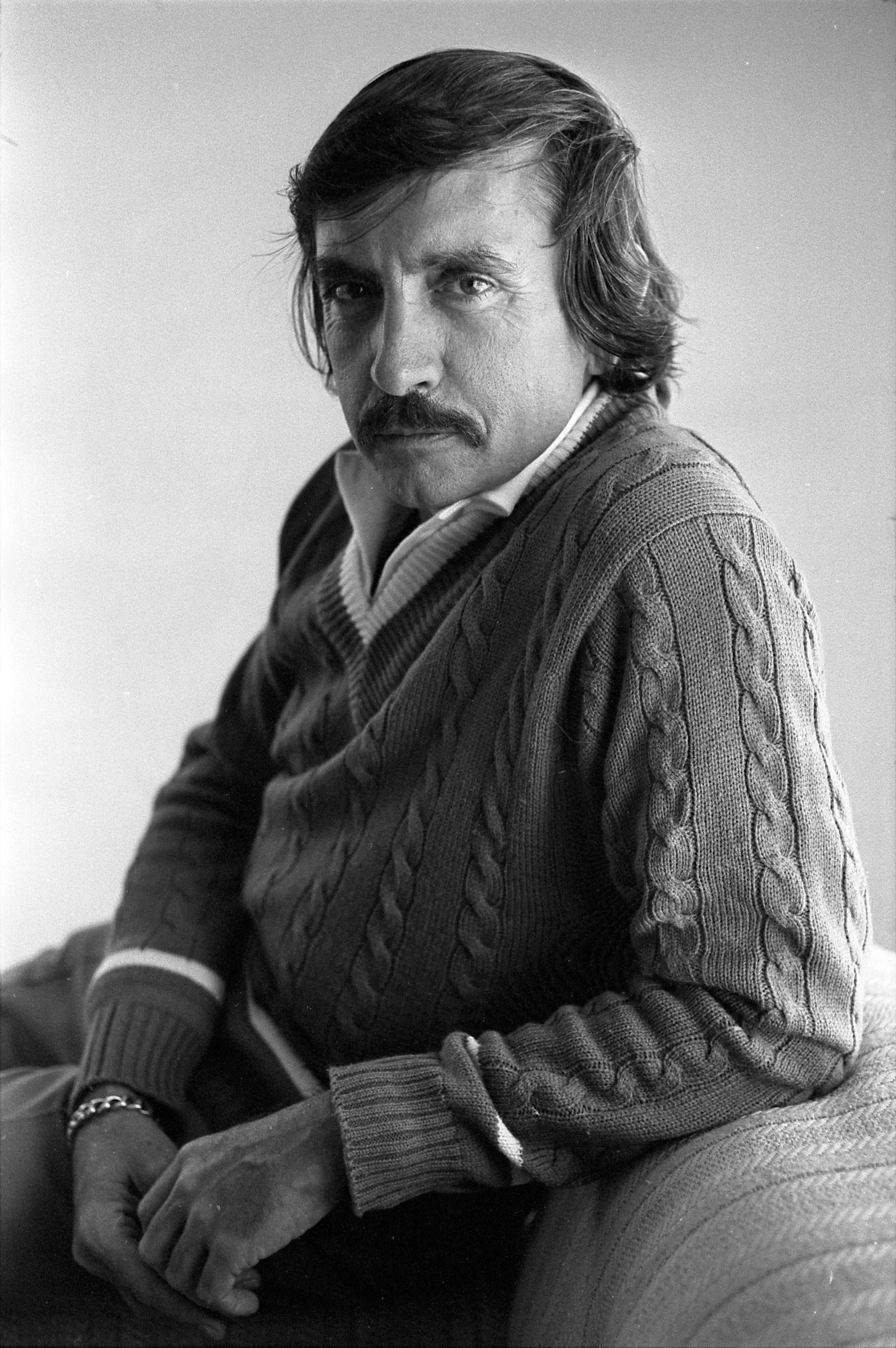
- Albee in 1975
- Born: Edward Franklin Albee III; March 12, 1928; Washington, D.C., U.S.
- Died: September 16, 2016 (aged 88); Montauk, New York, U.S.
- Education: Trinity College
- Partner(s): Jonathan Thomas (esp. 1971; died 2005)
- Writing career
- Period: 1958–2016
- Notable works: Who's Afraid of Virginia Woolf?; The Zoo Story; A Delicate Balance; The Goat, or Who Is Sylvia?; Three Tall Women
- Notable awards: Pulitzer Prize for Drama; Tony Award for Best Play; National Medal of Arts; Special Tony Award; America Award in Literature

Edward Franklin Albee III (/ˈɔːlbiː/ AWL-bee; March 12, 1928 – September 16, 2016) was an American playwright known for works such as The Zoo Story (1958), The Sandbox (1959), Who's Afraid of Virginia Woolf? (1962), A Delicate Balance (1966), and Three Tall Women (1994). Some critics have argued that some of his work constitutes an American variant of what Martin Esslin identified as and named the Theater of the Absurd. Three of his plays won the Pulitzer Prize for Drama and two of his other works won the Tony Award for Best Play.

His works are often considered frank examinations of the modern condition. His early works reflect a mastery and Americanization of the Theatre of the Absurd that found its peak in works by European playwrights such as Samuel Beckett, Eugène Ionesco, and Jean Genet.

His middle period comprised plays that explored the psychology of maturing, marriage and sexual relationships. Younger American playwrights, such as Paula Vogel, credit Albee's mix of theatricality and biting dialogue with helping to reinvent postwar American theatre in the early 1960s. Later in life, Albee continued to experiment in works such as The Goat, or Who Is Sylvia? (2002).

== Early life ==
Edward Albee was born in 1928. His biological father left his mother, Louise Harvey, and he was placed for adoption two weeks later and taken to Larchmont, New York, where he grew up. Albee's adoptive father, Reed A. Albee, the wealthy son of vaudeville magnate Edward Franklin Albee II, owned several theaters. His adoptive mother, Reed's second wife, Frances (Cotter), was a socialite. He later based the main character of his 1991 play Three Tall Women on his mother, with whom he had a conflicted relationship.

Albee spent multiple childhood summers at Adirondack Camp in Glenburnie-on-Lake George, New York, and later at the Lake Sunapee Summer School in New Hampshire. The camp newspaper, The Adirondack Eagle, listed him as an intermediate reporter in its August 3, 1940 issue, and carried a short account of an overnight hike written by him when he was twelve.

Albee attended the Rye Country Day School, then the Lawrenceville School in New Jersey, from which he was expelled. He then was sent to Valley Forge Military Academy in Wayne, Pennsylvania, where he was dismissed in less than a year. He enrolled at The Choate School (now Choate Rosemary Hall) in Wallingford, Connecticut, graduating in 1946. He had attracted theatre attention by having scripted and published nine poems, eleven short stories, essays, a long act play, Schism, and a 500-page novel, The Flesh of Unbelievers (Horn, 1) in 1946. His formal education continued at Trinity College in Hartford, Connecticut, where he was expelled in 1947 for skipping classes and refusing to attend compulsory chapel.

Albee left home for good in his late teens. In a later interview, he said: "I never felt comfortable with the adoptive parents. I don't think they knew how to be parents. I probably didn't know how to be a son, either." In a 1994 interview, he said he left home at 18 because "[he] had to get out of that stultifying, suffocating environment." In 2008, he told interviewer Charlie Rose that he was "thrown out" because his parents wanted him to become a "corporate thug" and did not approve of his aspirations to be a writer.

== Career ==
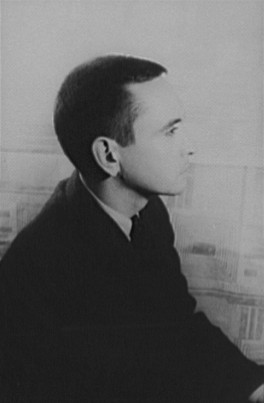
Edward Albee, photographed by Carl Van Vechten, 1961

=== 1959–1966: The Early Plays ===
Albee moved into New York's Greenwich Village, where he supported himself with odd jobs while learning to write plays. His roommate in New York was the composer William Flanagan. Primarily in his early plays, Albee's work had various characters that challenged the image of a heterosexual marriage. Despite challenging society's views about the gay community, he did not view himself as an LGBT advocate. Albee's work typically criticized the American Dream. His first play, The Zoo Story, written in three weeks, was first staged in Berlin in 1959 before premiering off-Broadway in 1960. His next, The Death of Bessie Smith, similarly premiered in Berlin before arriving in New York.

Albee's most iconic play, Who's Afraid of Virginia Woolf?, opened on Broadway at the Billy Rose Theatre on October 13, 1962, and closed on May 16, 1964, after five previews and 664 performances. The opening night cast featured Uta Hagen, Arthur Hill, George Grizzard and Melinda Dillon. The play won the Tony Award for Best Play in 1963 and was selected for the 1963 Pulitzer Prize by the award's drama jury, but the selection was overruled by the advisory committee, which elected not to give a drama award at all. The two members of the jury, John Mason Brown and John Gassner, subsequently resigned in protest. An Academy Award-winning film adaptation by Ernest Lehman was released in 1966 starring Elizabeth Taylor, Richard Burton, George Segal, and Sandy Dennis, and was directed by Mike Nichols. In 2013, the film was selected for preservation in the United States National Film Registry by the Library of Congress as "culturally, historically, or aesthetically significant".

=== 1971–1987: The Middle Plays ===
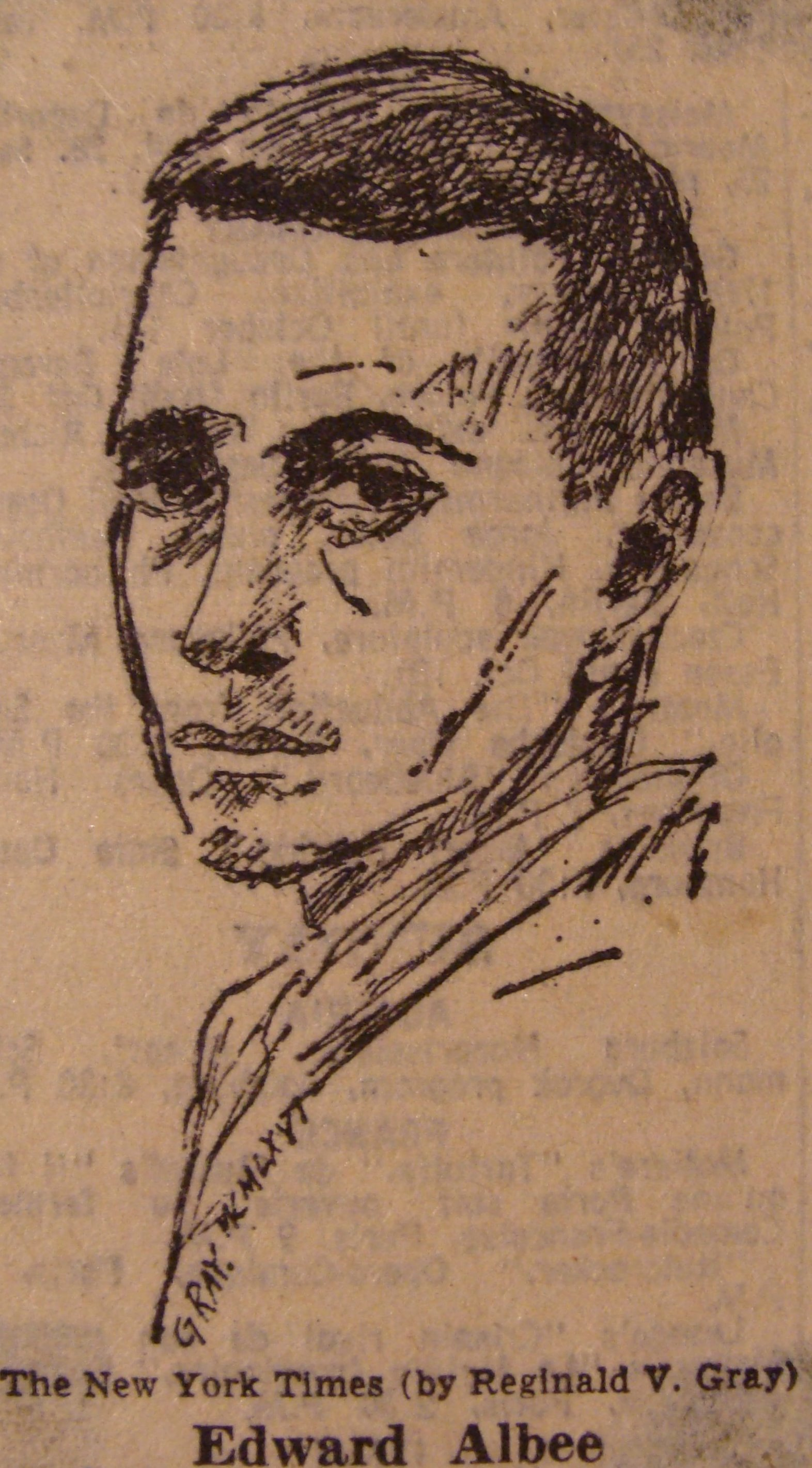
Edward Albee by Irish artist Reginald Gray (The New York Times, 1966), inspired by a photograph taken in 1962 from Bettmann/Corbis.

In 1971 he wrote All Over, a two-act play originally titled Death, the second half of a projected double bill with another play called Life (which later became Seascape). The play premiered on Broadway at the Martin Beck Theatre with John Gielgud directing and starred Jessica Tandy, Madeleine Sherwood, and Colleen Dewhurst. The New York Times writer Clive Barnes wrote, "It is a lovely, poignant and deeply felt play. In no way at all is it an easy play -- this formal minuet of death, this symphony ironically celebrating death's dominion. It is not easy in its structure, a series of almost operatic arias demanding, in their precision, pin-point concentration from the audience, and it is certainly not easy in its subject matter."

In 1974 he wrote Seascape, which won the Pulitzer Prize for Drama. It debuted on Broadway with Deborah Kerr and Frank Langella. It was nominated for the Tony Award for Best Play losing to Peter Shaffer's Equus. Clive Barnes of The New York Times declared the play "a major event", adding, "As Mr. Albee has matured as a playwright, his work has become leaner, sparer and simpler. He depends on strong theatrical strokes to attract the attention of the audience, but the tone of the writing is always thoughtful, even careful, even philosophic." He compared his work alongside Samuel Beckett and Harold Pinter.

Albee continued to write plays including Listening (1976), Counting the Ways (1976) before a brief break before The Lady from Dubuque (1980) which had a short run on Broadway. He wrote the three act play The Man Who Had Three Arms (1983) which was received negatively with Frank Rich of The New York Times writing, "isn't a play - it's a temper tantrum in two acts... One of the more shocking lapses of Mr. Albee's writing is that he makes almost no attempt even to pretend that Himself is anything other than a maudlin stand-in for himself, with the disappearing arm representing an atrophied talent."

Albee's plays during the 1980s received mixed reviews with Michael Billington of The Guardian writing, "American dramatists invariably end up as victims of their own myth: in a success-crazed culture they are never forgiven for failing to live up to their own early masterpieces. But if Edward Albee has suffered the same cruel fate as Arthur Miller and Tennessee Williams, he has kept on trucking". Billington wrote of Albee's 1987 play, Marriage Play, "At the end the play achieves a metaphorical resonance by suggesting that marriage is an accumulation of meaningless habits and that "nothing has made any difference".

=== 1991–2016: The Later Plays ===
In 1991 he wrote the play Three Tall Women, a two act play that premiered at the Vienna's English Theatre about three unnamed women. The play was revived in 2018 directed by Joe Mantello starring Glenda Jackson, Laurie Metcalf, and Allison Pill. The 2018 production received the Tony Award for Best Revival of a Play. Allison Adato of Entertainment Weekly wrote of the play, "Edward Albee's Three Tall Women, in which a nonagenarian revisits events of her life refracted through both her own dementia and the differing recollections of her younger selves, is a not-quite-memory play filled with regret, resentment, entitlement, various bodily indignities".

Georgia State University English professor Matthew Roudane divides Albee's plays into three periods: the Early Plays (1959–1966), characterized by gladiatorial confrontations, bloodied action and fight to the metaphorical death; the Middle Plays (1971–1987), when Albee lost the favor of Broadway audience and started premiering in the U.S. regional theaters and in Europe; and the Later Plays (1991–2016), received as a remarkable comeback and watched by appreciative audiences and critics the world over.

According to The New York Times, Albee was "widely considered to be the foremost American playwright of his generation." The less-than-diligent student later dedicated much of his time to promoting American university theatre. He served as a Distinguished Professor of Playwriting and held the Lyndall Finley Wortham Chair in the Performing Arts at the University of Houston. His plays are published by Dramatists Play Service and Samuel French, Inc.

== Philanthropy ==
Albee established the Edward F. Albee Foundation, Inc. in 1967, from royalties from his play Who's Afraid of Virginia Woolf?. The foundation funds the William Flanagan Memorial Creative Persons Center (named after the composer William Flanagan, but better known as "The Barn") in Montauk, New York, as a residence for writers and visual artists. The foundation's mission is "to serve writers and visual artists from all walks of life, by providing time and space in which to work without disturbance."

== Personal life and death ==
Albee was gay and stated that he first knew he was gay at age twelve and a half.

As a teen in Larchmont, Albee became a close friend of English-born Muir Weissinger Jr. and his family. Albee, along with others, referred to Florence, Muir's mother, as "Mummy". For her part, Albee's mother felt he spent too much time at the Weissinger household. Albee dated Muir's sister, Delphine, and escorted her to her coming-out party. Albee and Delphine had a "long and intense relationship" while it lasted; Albee has said they were "unofficially engaged". Albee kept in touch for a long time with Florence and Muir Weissinger.

Albee insisted that he did not want to be known as a "gay writer", saying in his acceptance speech for the 2011 Lambda Literary Foundation's Pioneer Award for Lifetime Achievement: "A writer who happens to be gay or lesbian must be able to transcend self. I am not a gay writer. I am a writer who happens to be gay." His longtime partner, Jonathan Richard Thomas, a sculptor, died on May 2, 2005, from bladder cancer. They had been partners from 1971 until Thomas's death. Albee also had a relationship of several years with playwright Terrence McNally during the 1950s. Albee died at his home in Montauk, New York on September 16, 2016, aged 88.

Albee lived in a 6,000-square-foot loft that was a former cheese warehouse in New York's Tribeca neighborhood. At the time of his death Albee held an expansive collection of fine art, utilitarian works and sculptures. Albee was especially interested in artworks created by indigenous cultures in Africa and Oceania.

== Accolades and accomplishments ==
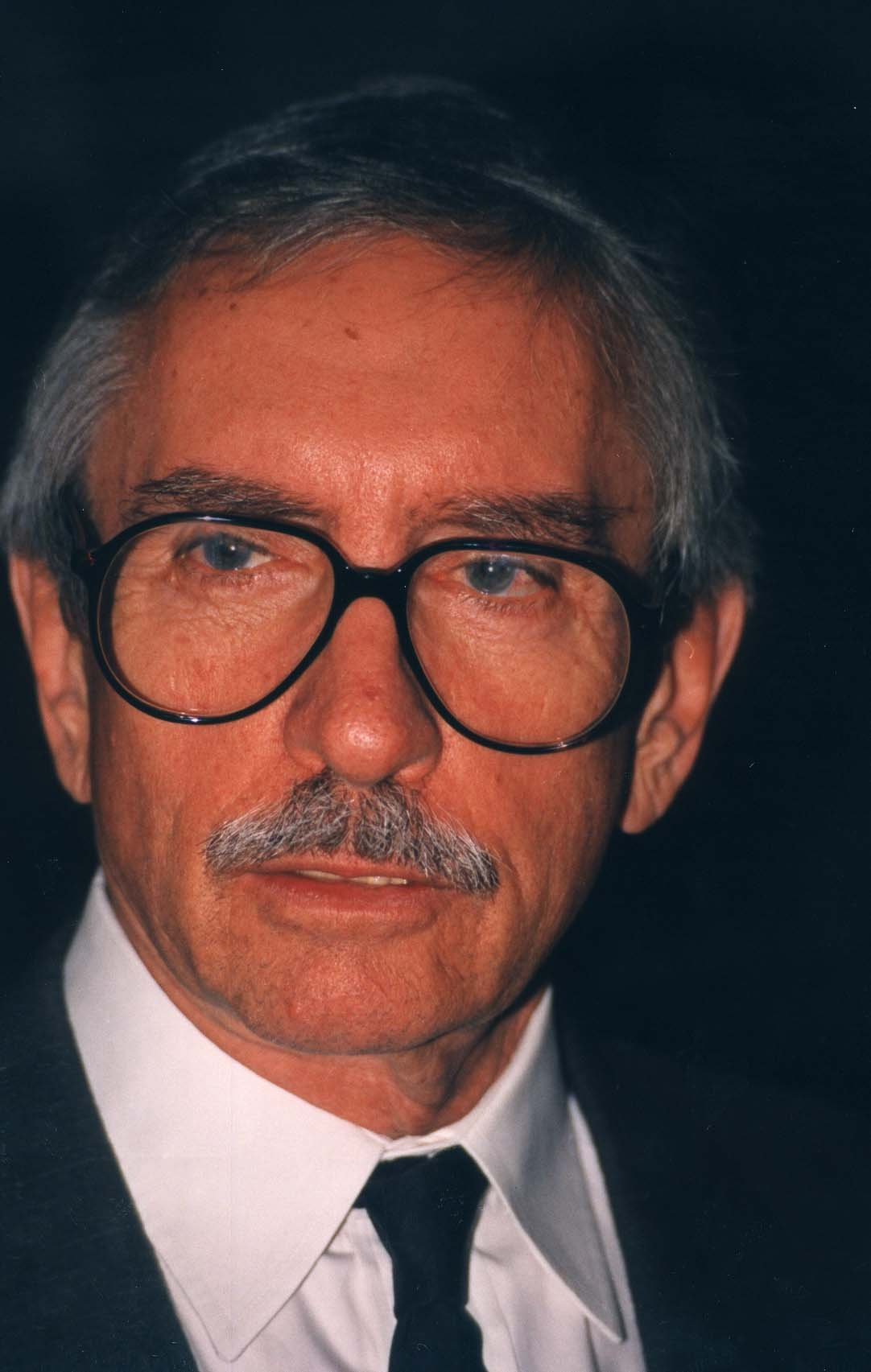
Albee in 1997

A member of the Dramatists Guild Council, Albee received three Pulitzer Prizes for drama—for A Delicate Balance (1967), Seascape (1975), and Three Tall Women (1994). Albee was elected a Fellow of the American Academy of Arts and Sciences in 1972. In 1985, Albee was inducted into the American Theatre Hall of Fame. In 1999, Albee received the PEN/Laura Pels Theater Award as a Master American Dramatist. He received a Special Tony Award for Lifetime Achievement (2005); the gold medal in Drama from the American Academy and Institute of Arts and Letters (1980); as well as the Kennedy Center Honors and the National Medal of Arts (both in 1996). In 2009, Albee received honorary degree from the Bulgarian National Academy of Theater and Film Arts (NATFA), a member of the Global Alliance of Theater Schools. In 2008, in celebration of Albee's 80th birthday, a number of his plays were mounted in distinguished off-Broadway venues, including the historic Cherry Lane Theatre where the playwright directed two of his early one-acts, The American Dream and The Sandbox.

Pulitzer Prize
Year	Category	Project	Result	Ref.
1967	Pulitzer Prize for Drama	A Delicate Balance	Won	
1975	Pulitzer Prize for Drama	Seascape	Won	
1994	Pulitzer Prize for Drama	Three Tall Women	Won	
2001	Pulitzer Prize for Drama	The Play About the Baby	Nominated	
2003	Pulitzer Prize for Drama	The Goat, or Who Is Sylvia?	Nominated	
Tony Awards
1963	Best Play	Who's Afraid of Virginia Woolf?	Won	
1964	Best Play	The Ballad of the Sad Cafe	Nominated	
1965	Best Author	Tiny Alice	Nominated	
1965	Best Play	Tiny Alice	Nominated	
1967	Best Play	A Delicate Balance	Nominated	
1975	Best Play	Seascape	Nominated	
2002	Best Play	The Goat, or Who Is Sylvia?	Won	
2005	Lifetime Achievement		Received	
Drama Desk Award
1960	Vernon Rice Award	The Zoo Story	Won	
1975	Outstanding New Play	Seascape	Nominated	
1976	Outstanding Director of a Play	Who's Afraid of Virginia Woolf?	Nominated	
1994	Outstanding Play	Three Tall Women	Nominated	
2002	Outstanding New Play	The Goat, or Who Is Sylvia?	Won	
2008	Special Award		Received	
Grammy Award
1963	Best Spoken Word Album	Who's Afraid of Virginia Woolf?	Won	
1963	Best Album Notes	Who's Afraid of Virginia Woolf?	Nominated	

Honorary awards

- 1995: St. Louis Literary Award from the Saint Louis University Library Associates
- 1996: National Medal of Arts
- 2003 Fitzgerald Award Award for Achievement in American Literature award
- 2005: Academy of Achievement's Golden Plate Award
- 2011: Edward MacDowell Medal for Lifetime Achievement
- 2011: Pioneer Award for Lifetime Achievement, Lambda Literary Foundation
- 2013: Chicago Tribune Literary Prize
- 2015: America Award in Literature

== Works ==
=== Plays ===
Works written or adapted by Albee:

- The Zoo Story (1959)
- The Death of Bessie Smith (1960)
- The Sandbox (1960)
- Fam and Yam (1960)
- The American Dream (1961)
- Who's Afraid of Virginia Woolf? (1962)
- Tiny Alice (1964)
- Malcolm (1966)
- A Delicate Balance (1966)
- Box and Quotations from Chairman Mao Tse-Tung (1968)
- All Over (1971)
- Seascape (1975)
- Listening (1976)
- Counting the Ways (1976)
- The Lady from Dubuque (1980)
- The Man Who Had Three Arms (1982)
- Finding the Sun (1983)
- Walking (1984)
- Envy (1985)
- Marriage Play (1987)
- Three Tall Women (1991)
- The Lorca Play (1992)
- Fragments (1993)
- The Play About the Baby (1998)
- The Goat, or Who Is Sylvia? (2000)
- Occupant (2001)
- Knock! Knock! Who's There!? (2003)
- At Home at the Zoo (2004)
- Me, Myself and I (2007)

=== Stage Adaptations ===
- The Ballad of the Sad Café
  (Broadway 1963, adapted from the novella by Carson McCullers)
- Malcolm
  (Broadway 1966, adapted from the novel by James Purdy)
- Breakfast at Tiffany's
  (Broadway 1966, adapted from the novella by Truman Capote)
- Everything in the Garden
  (Broadway 1967, adapted from the play by Giles Cooper)
- Lolita
  (Broadway 1981, adapted from the novel by Vladimir Nabokov)

=== Opera libretti ===
- Bartleby (adapted from the short story by Herman Melville) (1961)
- The Ice Age (1963, uncompleted)

=== Essays ===
- Stretching My Mind: Essays 1960–2005 (Avalon Publishing, 2005). ISBN 9780786716210.

== Sources ==
- "Edward Albee". Charlie Rose, May 27, 2008.
