= The Death of Bessie Smith =

Play by Edward Albee

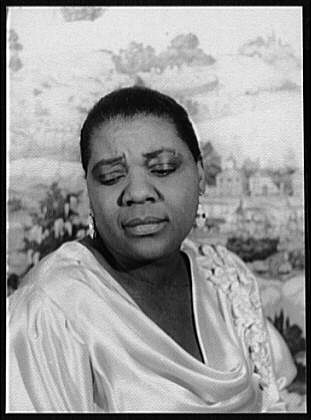
Carl van Vechten portrait of Bessie Smith

The Death of Bessie Smith is a one-act play by American playwright Edward Albee, written in 1959 and premiered in West Berlin the following year. The play consists of a series of conversations between Bernie and his friend Jack, Jack and an off-stage Bessie, and black and white staff of a whites-only hospital in Memphis, Tennessee on the death date of the famous blues singer, Bessie Smith, who died in a car wreck.

== Production history ==
The play premiered in West Berlin at the Schlosspark Theatre, Berlin, Germany on April 21, 1960.

It premiered Off-Broadway at the York Playhouse on March 1, 1961, in a double bill with Albee's The American Dream. Directed by Lawrence Arrick, the nurse was played by Rae Allen, and Ben Piazza played "the young man".

The play opened on Broadway in repertory with other Albee plays, at the Billy Rose Theatre on October 2, 1968, for 12 performances. Directed by Michael Kahn, Rosemary Murphy played the nurse, and Ben Piazza played the intern.

The work was first staged in London's West End at the Royal Court Theatre in 1961 with Gene Anderson as the nurse, Tommy Eytle as Jack, Robert Ayres as the Father, Avril Elgar as the second nurse, and Richard Easton as the intern.

In the original British Actors edition approved by the Lord Chamberlain for performance in Britain, the scene with the line My love is like a tent with the pole pointing upwards (i.e. an erection) was censored.

As part of an Albee Festival, the Goodman Theatre in Chicago, presented The Death of Bessie Smith in 2003.

New Brooklyn Theatre produced The Death of Bessie Smith in January 2014 at Interfaith Medical Center to raise awareness about several New York City hospitals in danger of closing.

== Plot overview ==
The play is set in 1937 in Memphis, Tennessee, in a segregated hospital and its surrounding grounds.

The character of Bessie Smith is only referred to in Albee's play and does not appear on stage. In early performances, Albee did not even allow music or pictures of her to be used.

== Historical accuracy ==
The incident upon which the play is based is a myth that was largely accepted as fact until convincing evidence to the contrary appeared in the original 1972 edition of Bessie, a biography of the singer. Bessie Smith did indeed die following a car crash, but she was never refused admittance to a white hospital, which is the premise of Albee's play. She was taken directly to the Afro-American Hospital in Clarksdale, Mississippi, where she died some seven hours later. The idea that she was refused entry to the whites-only hospital originated in an article by jazz writer and producer John Hammond in the November 1937 issue of Down Beat.

== Characters ==
- Bernie: A black man, about forty, thin.
- Jack: A dark-skinned black man, forty-five, bulky, with a deep voice and a mustache.
- The Father: A thin, balding white man, about fifty-five.
- The Nurse: A southern white girl, full-blown, dark- or red-haired, pretty, cute, with a wild laugh. Twenty-six.
- The Orderly: A light-skinned Negro, twenty-eight, clean-shaven, trim, prim.
- Second Nurse: A southern white girl, blond, not too pretty, about thirty.
- The Intern: A southern white man, blond, well put-together, with an amiable face, thirty.
