= The Play About the Baby =

1998 play by Edward Albee

- The poster for the first American production
- Original language: English
- Written by: Edward Albee
- Characters: The Man The Woman; The Boy The Girl

Premiere
- Date: 1998
- Place: Malvern Theatres; Malvern, Worcestershire

The Play About the Baby is a play by Edward Albee.

== Productions ==
The play premiered in London in September 1998 at the Almeida Theatre Company in Malvern, Worcestershire, directed by Howard Davies.

The play's American premiere was in Houston, Texas at the Alley Theatre in April to June 2000. Directed by Albee, the cast was Rebecca Harris - Girl, David Burtka - Boy, Earle Hyman - Man, and Marian Seldes - Woman.

The play opened Off-Broadway at the Century Center for the Performing Arts, running from February 1, 2001 to September 1, 2001. David Esbjornson directed. The play won the 2000-2001 Obie Award, Performance (Brian Murray). It was nominated for the 2001 Outer Critics Circle Award, Outstanding Actress in a Play (Marian Seldes) and 2001 Lucille Lortel Award, Outstanding Play, Outstanding Actress (Marian Seldes) and Outstanding Actor (Brian Murray).

The play was a finalist for the 2001 Pulitzer Prize for Drama.

== Cast ==
Character The Man The Woman The Boy The Girl	Original London cast Alan Howard Frances de la Tour Rupert Penry-Jones Zöe Waites	Off-Broadway cast Brian Murray Marian Seldes David Burtka Kathleen Early

== Overview ==
The play opens in a version of Eden, with the Boy and Girl, who is pregnant. The Girl gives birth to the baby. Soon, a middle-aged couple, the Man and Woman appear. The Woman states that she is not an actress, but she is "a trifle theatrical." The Man and Woman tell anecdotes and speak directly to the audience, asking for their opinion on various matters. While the Man talks about his thoughts on religion, such as the Sermon on the Mount, the Woman translates into sign language. They say they are there to take the baby away. Boy asks who they are, wondering if they might be Gypsies. As the play ends, the Man shows them that the blanket that held the baby is empty.

Albee "has confirmed that the baby is meant to be real even though we never actually see it."

The set design changed from the original, which was a Victorian apartment, to the "sterile no-man's-land with a sterile play space decorated with children's toys."

== Critical response ==
Matt Wolf, in his review of the 1998 London production for Variety, wrote: "A lot of people are going to be mystified by 'The Play About the Baby,'... but if there’s any justice, at least an equal number will be mesmerized as well. Witty, cryptic and finally very disturbing, the play is essential (if minor) Albee that shows a major American dramatist — now age 70 — continuing a career of experimentation that has always been very European in its absurdist embrace and subsequent disregard for naturalism. Whatever its ellipses, the new work is thrillingly served by its Almeida Theater quartet, who find the wrenching emotion in what could be highly self-conscious and arch."

Charles Isherwood, in his review of the 2001 production for Variety, wrote: "...for all its vaudevillian diversions and seemingly pointless digressions, it’s clear and sharp as a knife, and full of subtle correspondences. The play’s oddnesses and baroque structure mirror the haphazard patterns of life, after all....If it’s fundamentally about loss, 'The Play About the Baby”' also is about survival, how we 'get through it all,' as the Man says..."

Barbara Lee Horn (Professor, Dept. of Speech, Communication Sciences, and Theatre, St. John's University) noted "The reviews were exceedingly mixed along the way."
