= The Sandbox (play) =

1959 play by Edward Albee

The Sandbox is a play written by Edward Albee in 1959.

== Productions ==
The first performance was on April 15, 1960 in the Jazz Gallery in New York City. The show was staged by Lawrence Arrick, original music by William Flanagan. The show starred Alan Helm (Young Man), Jane Hoffman (Mommy), Richard Woods (Daddy), Sudie Bond (Grandma), and Hal McKusick (Musician).

The play was produced Off-Broadway at the Cherry Lane Theatre in February 1962, in repertory with other Albee plays, in a Theatre of the Absurd series.

The play had several regional productions, including the Dallas Theatre Center in January 1963 starring Ruth Winchester in the lead role and the Los Angeles Theatre Company (season 1967-68). The play was performed as a collection of One Act plays in the spring of 1978 at Long Branch Junior High School in Long Branch New Jersey starring Michelle Begley and David Schroeder The play ran Off-Broadway, produced by The Acting Company, at the Public Theatre in March 1984, with 8 modern one-act plays, titled Pieces of Eight, directed by Alan Schneider.

The play was produced Off-Broadway by the Signature Theatre Company in a triple bill of one-act plays by Albee: Sand, The Sandbox and Finding the Sun. The plays ran from February 4, 1994 to March 6, 1994. Directed by Albee, the cast was Peggy Consgrave (Mommy), Jane Hoffman (Grandma), Edward Seamon (Daddy), Aisha Benoir (Cellist), and Earl Nash (Young Man).

The play was performed Off-Broadway at the Cherry Lane Theatre in March 2008, in a double bill with The American Dream. Directed by Albee, the cast featured Judith Ivey (Mommy), George Bartenieff (Daddy), Lois Markle (Grandma), Jesse Williams (Young Man) and Daniel Shevlin (Musician).

The play was produced Off-Broadway by the Signature Theatre Company in a triple bill of one-act plays by Edward Albee, Maria Irene Fornes, and Adrienne Kennedy. The plays ran from May 3, 2016 to June 19, 2016. Directed by Lila Neugebauer, the cast was Alison Fraser (Mommy), Phyllis Somerville (Grandma), Frank Wood (Daddy), Melody Giron (Cellist), and Ryan-James Hatanaka (Young Man).

The play is approximately 15 minutes long and involves direct address by the actors to the audience, their acknowledgment that they are performers in a play, and the offering of cues to the musician.

== Characters ==
- Mommy: 55, a well-dressed, imposing woman. She is Grandma's daughter. After marrying Daddy, she brings her mother from the farm and into their big town house in the city. She gives her mom an army blanket, her own dish, and a nice place under the stove.
- Daddy: 60, a small man; gray, thin. He is the rich man that Mommy married.
- Grandma: 86, a tiny, wizened woman with bright eyes. She is the protagonist of the play. She married a farmer at the age of 17. Her husband died when she was 30, and she raised Mommy by herself from there on. Grandma is at conflict with her family, society, and death.
- The Young Man: 25, a good-looking, well-built boy in a bathing suit. He is the angel of death, performing calisthenics that suggest the beating of wings. He is from Southern California, but hasn't been given a name yet.
- The Musician: No particular age, but young would be nice. He does not speak and must be directed to play or stop playing his music.

== Plot synopsis ==
Beginning with brightest day, the Young Man is performing calisthenics (which he continues to do until the very end of the play) near a sandbox (or sandpit) at the beach. Mommy and Daddy have brought Grandma all the way out from the city and placed her in the sandbox. As Mommy and Daddy wait nearby in some chairs, the Musician plays off and on, according to what the other characters instruct him to do. Throughout the play, the Young Man is very pleasant, greeting the other characters with a smile as he says, "Hi!". As Mommy and Daddy cease to acknowledge Grandma while they wait, Grandma reverts from her childish behavior and begins to speak coherently to the audience. Grandma and the Young Man begin to converse with each other. Grandma feels comfortable talking with the Young Man as he treats her like a human being (whereas Mommy and Daddy imply through their actions and dialogue that she is more of a chore that they must take care of). While still talking with the Young Man, she reminds someone off-stage that it should be nighttime by now. Once brightest day has become deepest night, Mommy and Daddy hear on-stage rumbling. Acknowledging that the sounds are literally coming from off-stage and not from thunder or breaking waves, Mommy knows that Grandma's death is here and weeps heavily. As daylight resumes, Mommy talks about how they must move on while standing by the sandbox before quickly exiting with Daddy. Although Grandma, who is lying down half buried in sand, has continued to mock Mommy and Daddy, she soon realizes that she can no longer move. It is at this moment that the Young Man finally stops performing his calisthenics and approaches Grandma and the sandbox. As he directs her to be still, he reveals that he is the angel of death and says, "...I am come for you." Even though he says his line like a real amateur, Grandma compliments him and closes her eyes with a smile.

== Critical response ==
The play received an almost universally negative reception, as critics attacked the confusing, absurdist plot.

However, Ben Brantley, in his review of the 2008 Off-Broadway production in The New York Times, wrote that The Sandbox was a better play than The American Dream, with which it was paired. Brantley wrote that The Sandbox "remains a harrowingly effective chamber piece." Joe Dziemianowicz, in his review of the 2008 double bill for The New York Daily News wrote: "...these satires on the storybook family deliver swift comic kicks and a piercing sting. They also contain the absurdism, acrobatic language and provocative thoughts on marriage and children that define Albee's long, illustrious career....The production [The Sandbox] benefits from snappy design, Albee's smart direction, and solid acting, though Markle, a last-minute replacement, seems too hearty for her role. On the other hand, Ivey is an ideal Mommy. Her acidly funny performance is enough for me to urge seeing this double bill double-quick."
