= The American Dream (play) =

One-act play written by Edward Albee

- Written by: Edward Albee
- Subject: The American Dream
- Genre: Satire

Premiere
- Date: January 24, 1961
- Place: York Playhouse (Off-Broadway)

The American Dream is an early, one-act play by American playwright Edward Albee. It premiered in 1961.

== Productions ==
The play premiered Off-Broadway on January 24, 1961 at the York Playhouse. The play was produced by Theatre 1961, which was formed by Richard Barr and Clinton Wilder. Directed by Alan Schneider, the cast featured John C. Becher (Daddy), Jane Hoffman (Mommy), Sudie Bond (Grandma), Nancy Cushman (Mrs. Barker), and Ben Piazza (the Young Man).

The play was presented Off-Broadway at the Cherry Lane Theatre in September 1962 in a double bill with The Zoo Story, directed by Schneider.

The play was produced Off-Broadway at the Cherry Lane Theatre from March 23, 1964 to November 8, 1964, in a double bill with Dutchman by LeRoi Jones. Schneider directed, with the same cast as in 1961.

The play was presented Off-Broadway at the Cherry Lane Theatre from April 1, 2008 to May 3, 2008 in a double bill with The Sandbox. Directed by Albee, the cast featured Judith Ivey (Mommy), George Bartenieff (Daddy), and Lois Markle (Grandma). Kate Mulgrew took over the role of Mommy on April 22, 2008, but had to leave the show, causing it to close on May 3, 2008.

== Characters ==
- Mommy: Grandma's daughter and Daddy's commanding wife. She fulfills the stereotypical role of a housewife, and it is strongly suggested that she married Daddy for his money.
- Daddy: Mommy's submissive husband. It is suggested that he works a high-paying administrative job.
- Grandma: Mommy's mother. She is portrayed as the most intelligent character in the family, and is the only character to physically break the fourth wall.
- Mrs. Barker: Mommy's friend. Mrs. Barker is the caricature of the dim-witted socially responsible American housewife.
- The Young Man: Ostensibly an itinerant worker, The Young Man enters Mommy and Daddy's apartment looking for work and is accepted into their family.

== Overview ==
The play, a satire on American family life, concerns a married couple and their elderly mother. On a particular day, they are visited by two guests who turn their worlds upside down.

The central family consists of a Mommy, a domineering wife, Daddy, an emasculated and submissive husband, and Grandma, the half-senile mother of Mommy. The play opens with the three of them discussing Mommy's day around a pile of boxes. An honorary member of the community and idol to Mommy, Mrs. Barker, enters and the dialogue continues with the occasional interjection by Grandma. Mommy and Daddy exit, leaving Mrs. Barker and Grandma alone. Grandma apparently knows why Mrs. Barker has been asked to come by and explains to her that Mommy and Daddy had adopted a son from her many years previously. As the parents objected to the child's actions, they mutilated it as punishment, eventually killing it. After Mrs. Barker exits, a Young Man appears at the door, looking for work. After hearing his life story, Grandma realizes that this Young Man, whom she dubs "The American Dream," is the twin of Mommy and Daddy's first child. As the first child was mutilated, he too suffered pain and has been left as an empty shell of a man. After seeing this Young Man as a way out, she moves her things and leaves. The Young Man is introduced to the family as a suitable replacement for the original child. The play ends with Mommy and Daddy celebrating the Young Man's arrival, with Grandma already forgotten.

Albee explores not only the falsity of the American Dream but also the status quo of the American family. As he states in the preface to the play, "It is an examination of the American Scene, an attack on the substitution of artificial for real values in our society, a condemnation of complacency, cruelty, emasculation, and vacuity; it is a stand against the fiction that everything in this slipping land of ours is peachy-keen."

Press notes state: "It is a ferocious, uproarious attack on the substitution of artificial for real values, a startling tale of murder and morality that rocks middle-class ethics to their complacent foundations. In it, Albee explores the hollowness of the American dream, as well as the fallacy of the ideal American family."

== Critical response ==
David Finkle, in reviewing the 2008 production for TheaterMania, wrote that the play takes on Albee's "abiding theme: the stultifying American family....Mommy and Daddy are, to say the least, unsympathetic.... the major impression with which an Albee fan will leave is how solidly in place Albee's need was to work out his psychological knots as an adopted child -- and how strong that compulsion has remained for almost 50 years. It now seems almost an after-thought that he's made theatergoers everywhere the lucky beneficiaries of his obsessive search for psychic balm."

The "New York Theatre Guide" reviewers wrote of the 2008 production: "Though hardly great theater, these one-acts give important insight into the budding playwright... Though 'American Dream' and 'Sandbox' are autobiographical, Albee is too complex a playwright to leave it there. He is not just trashing parents who didn't understand the unconventional young man they adopted, he is also trashing The American Dream, vilifying the people who took 'Father Knows Best,' 'Donna Reed,' and 'The Ozzie and Harriet Show' as their model for the best of all possible worlds... Taking our norms and turning them inside out and upside down is Albee's signature, and 'The American Dream' reminds us that we must constantly refine our own version of the American Dream before we eventually dive into the finality of the Sandbox."

Hilton Als, in The New Yorker, wrote about the play : "...is less about what happens than about how it happens—which, in the theatre, means how it’s said. Mommy and Daddy speak in rhythmic banalities. Greeting a guest named Mrs. Barker, Mommy asks, progressively, if she’d like a smoke, a drink, to cross her legs, and to remove her dress. Mrs. Barker responds to each inquiry in the same way: 'I don’t mind if I do.' Albee is showing us the trauma of repetition: the noxious glue that holds his married couples together, despite their rage—or because of it."
