= Martyna Majok =

Polish-American playwright (born 1985)

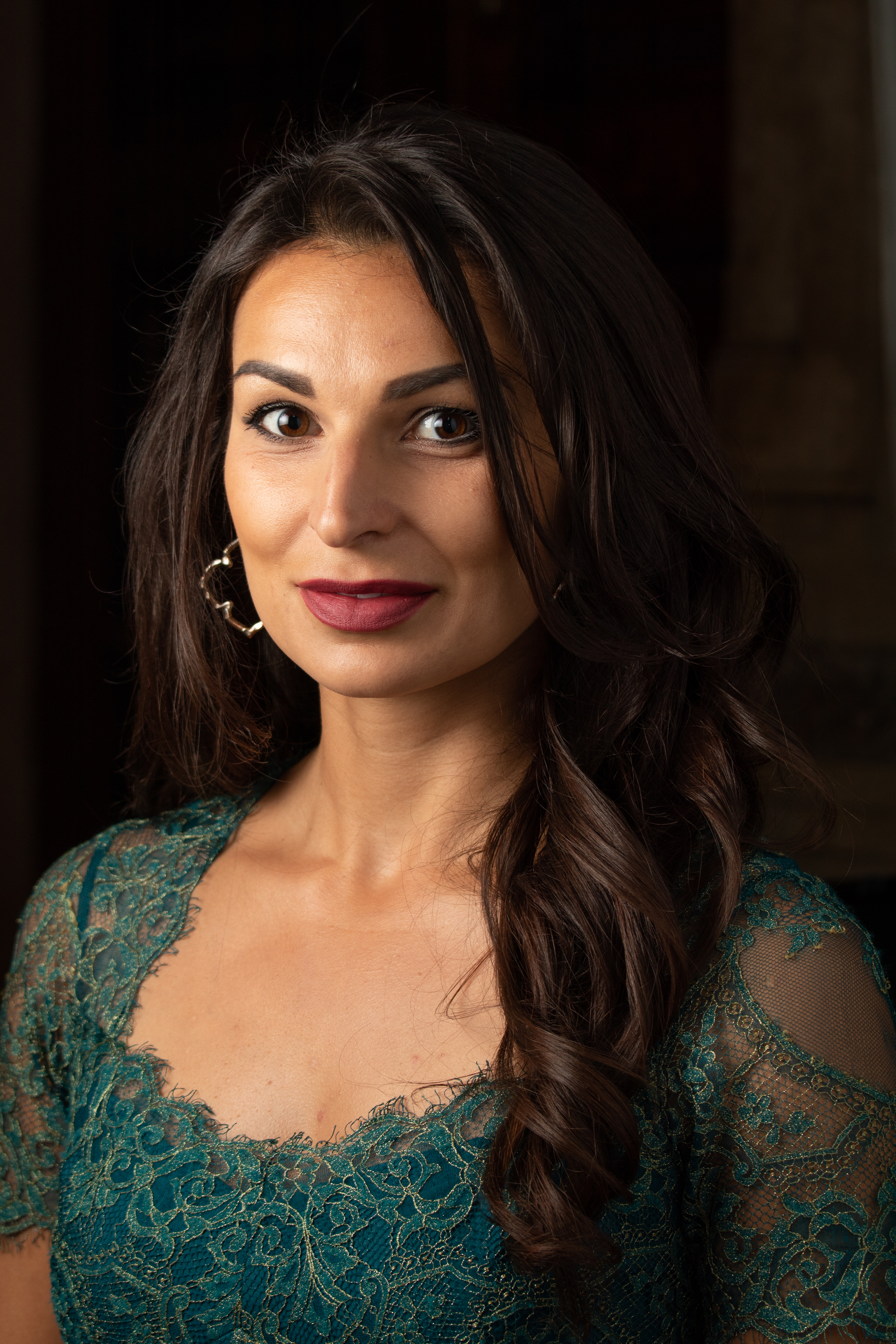
- Majok in 2018
- Born: Bytom, Silesia, Poland
- Education: University of Chicago (BA); Yale University (MFA); Juilliard School (GrDip)
- Occupation: Playwright
- Notable work: Ironbound; Cost of Living; Queens; Sanctuary City
- Awards: Pulitzer Prize for Drama; 2018 Cost of Living; (Full list)
- Website: martynamajok.com

Martyna Majok (/ˈmaɪoʊk/ MY-ohk) is a Polish-born American playwright who received the 2018 Pulitzer Prize for Drama for her play Cost of Living. She emigrated to the United States as a child and grew up in New Jersey. Majok studied playwriting at the Yale School of Drama and Juilliard School. Her plays are often politically engaged, feature dark humor, and experiment with structure and time.

Her breakthrough came with the play Ironbound (2014). As her work gained wider acclaim and recognition, Majok, who has a diverse writing style, debuted Cost of Living (2016), Queens (2018), and Sanctuary City (2021). She adapted The Great Gatsby for the musical "Gatsby: An American Myth," with Florence Welch and Thomas Bartlett writing music.

Martyna lives in Manhattan with her partner, actor Bobby Conte.

== Early life ==
Majok was born in Bytom, Upper Silesia and emigrated to the United States with her mother as a child. She grew up in a working-class, multicultural immigrant neighborhood; she recalls: "My mother began learning English when she came over. Everybody was working similar jobs. They had factory jobs together; they were cleaning houses, and taking care of the elderly." She went to public school. Majok won a playwriting contest for students from New Jersey as the only winner not from a private school that year; it was her first foray into drama. In high school, she wrote skits for an English language learning program for immigrant parents and children. At age 17, Majok was inspired by Sam Mendes' production of Cabaret at Studio 54, her first time in the theater, where she went with $45 she had won hustling pool.

== Education ==
She attended the University of Chicago on scholarship, where she took drama classes. Initially unsure of herself, Majok began to take part in theatrical performances when she discovered Sarah Kane’s plays in the library. She discovered that she preferred to write for the theater, in order to create roles she could identify with. To support herself, she worked as a waitress and personal caregiver for the disabled. She was also awarded the Merage Fellowship for the American Dream, an award for immigrant students, to help fund an education in writing. Majok then went on to attend the Yale School of Drama and the Juilliard School, all on stipends. She was a 2012–13 NNPN playwright-in-residence, the 2015–16 Playwrights of New York (PoNY) Fellow at The Lark, and a 2018–19 Hodder Fellow at the Princeton University.

== Career, style and themes ==
Majok is known for exploring underrepresented communities in her writing. She often gives voices to immigrants or displaced people, women with appetites and drives orbiting around their limitations, the working class, and persons with disabilities. Her work touches on class, yearning, loneliness and the journey towards connection with other human beings in America. While her subject matters can be tough, humor is important for her and Majok's characters brim with life and complications. Her women are strong and fight for their dignity. Reviewing her 2018 play Queens, an LA critic stated: "Majok specializes in anti-sentimentality."

Talking about her working method, she emphasized: "Workshops, whether in the 'traditional' playwright-of-a-play method or in a room with artists and no script, are my favorite part of making theatre." Discussing her inspirations, Majok pointed out her mother, and also said:

Aside from being an amazing production, Cabaret was a story set in dark times. It was funny and sexy and inviting, and didn’t compromise on any of that. That informs how I approach writing. People hear the description of my plays and say, 'Oh, that sounds sad.' And I swear to them that, actually, it’s funny. My friend calls them hear-me-out plays.

Her breakthrough play, Ironbound (2014), depicts the illusion of the American Dream and fighting for a place in the world through the eyes of a hard-working, barely-getting-by immigrant woman, living in the industrial wastelands of New Jersey. It is based on experiences from the author's mother. The play was praised by critics, won several awards including the 2016 Helen Hayes Awards's Charles McArthur Award for Outstanding Original New Play or Musical, and was featured in the top-ten of the 2014 Kilroys' List. Ironbound opened Off-Broadway in 2016 at the WP Theatre/Rattlestick.

An honest, original work that invites audiences to examine diverse perceptions of privilege and human connection through two pairs of mismatched individuals: a former trucker and his recently paralyzed ex-wife, and an arrogant young man with cerebral palsy and his new caregiver.

— Pulitzer Board (2018), Cost of Living

Cost of Living (2016), the winner of 2018 Pulitzer Prize for Drama, explores the interactions of abled and disabled individuals. Majok takes a broader look at class division, financially precarious characters, and the delicate emotional balance of need and care. It played Off-Broadway in a Manhattan Theatre Club production at City Center in June and July 2017. Jesse Green of The New York Times wrote: "in the play, two characters chafe against the way that a wheelchair, like color or language, can be a marker of disfavored status within the larger, normative society... it would be a mistake to see Cost of Living as an identity play about people with disabilities. Rather, it’s a play about disabilities with people. In both of its stories, which eventually collide, the biggest handicaps are the universal ones: fear and disconnection." This piece also won Outstanding Play at the Lucille Lortel Awards, got nomination for Outer Critics Circle Award's Outstanding New Off-Broadway Play, and was featured in the top-ten of the 2016 Kilroys' List, among other accolades.

Cost of Living has been produced around the world including in New York, Los Angeles, London, Toronto, Poland, Israel, and Cyprus.

In 2018, Queens (queens) premiered Off-Broadway at the Lincoln Center's LCT3/Claire Tow Theater. The play encompasses 16 years during which documented and undocumented women of two generations and different origin live together, in a basement apartment in Queens, New York, trying to support each other in their struggle with everyday life. The choices they have made come back to confront them. Queens is being developed into an original series for HBO; Majok is penning the adaptation and is set to executive produce.

In Sanctuary City (2020), she looks at a pair of teenage immigrants, one recently naturalized and the other undocumented, who hatch a plan to keep the latter in the U.S. The action takes place in Newark during the early 2000s when the DREAM Act was proposed and young immigrants hoped it might be a resolution to their uncertain status. "DREAMers, friends, and lovers negotiate the promise of safety and the weight of responsibility in America." Majok's story asks what we’re willing to sacrifice for someone we love, she said: “some of the things I'm exploring are the extent to which we help when we can, how much we are willing to care for and sacrifice for another person, and the cost of that, for both sides, particularly when coming from a world of limited means and guarantees.” Sanctuary City, produced by New York Theatre Workshop, had a world premiere Off-Broadway at the Lucille Lortel Theatre in March 2020, but was suspended after a few days due to the COVID-19 pandemic. It received an Edgerton Foundation New Play Award.

Majok's works has been presented and developed with many other theater companies, including La Jolla Playhouse, Round House, Kennedy Center, Geffen Playhouse, Fountain Theatre, and Steppenwolf Theatre. International productions include London, Toronto, Sydney, Poland, Israel, and Cyprus.

Among her other accolades and fellowships, she received Hermitage Greenfield Prize Jury in Drama in 2018 (as first female recipient of this commission), New York Theatre Workshop's 2050 Fellowship, and Puffin Foundation grant. She is alumna of 2014–16 WP Theater Lab, Ensemble Studio Theater's Youngblood, and Ars Nova’s Uncharted programs.

She has taught playwriting at Williams College, Wesleyan University, and SUNY Purchase College; in education projects such as Primary Stages ESPA, and NJ Rep; and as an assistant to Paula Vogel at Yale. Publications: Dramatists Play Service, Samuel French, TCG, Playscripts, and Smith & Kraus. In 2026 Majok began a position as distinguished playwright in residence at the School of Theatre and Dance at the University of Houston.

=== Other work ===
In April 2021, it was announced that Majok would adapt F. Scott Fitzgerald's The Great Gatsby for the stage, with Florence Welch and Doveman writing music. In 2023, the musical, Gatsby, premiered at the American Repertory Theater with Rebecca Frecknall, with whom Majok worked on Sanctuary City, directing. The producers stated that "Martyna and Rebecca are two of the most exciting theatre artists of their generation and, together, this extraordinary team brings a thrilling new perspective to one of the most culturally significant books of all time."

== Plays ==
=== Full-length plays ===
==== 2014: Ironbound ====
Ironbound is the story of a Polish immigrant, Darja, living in New Jersey working as a house cleaner and factory worker, as Majok's mother used to do. It examines the American Dream from Darja's eyes throughout 22 years. When asked how much Darja is like her mom Majok said: "A lot of the circumstances are hers, but the personality is more mine".

The play premiered at the Steppenwolf Theatre, Chicago in July 2014. In the fall of 2015, it was shown at the Round House Theatre in Bethesda, Maryland as a part of the Women's Voices Theatre Festival, where on opening night 300 people gave a standing ovation. Ironbound went on to an Off-Broadway run at the Rattlestick Playwrights Theater in 2016, in a co-production with Women's Project Theater. It started previews March 3, opened March 16, and closed April 24. The play featured direction by Daniella Topol, sets and lighting by Justin Townsend, costumes by Kaye Voyce, and sound by Jane Shaw. The cast included Marin Ireland as Darja, Shiloh Fernandez as Vic, and Morgan Spector as Tommy. The drama was also staged at the Geffen Playhouse, and National Theatre of Warsaw, amongst other theatres in America and abroad.

Nelson Pressley of The Washington Post called Ironbound a "knockout" and stated: "you seldom see plays that are both harsh and wonderful." BroadwayWorld's Jennifer Perry emphasized: "Majok proves exceptional at writing (a) richly-drawn character(s).", and it was The New York Times critic's pick. In 2013, the play script won the Smith Prize for Political Theater, a joint commission/award supported and administered by the National New Play Network, and it has also won the Aurora Theatre's Global Age Project Prize, the David Calicchio Emerging American Playwright Prize, and the Charles McArthur Award for Outstanding Original New Play or Musical at the 2016 Helen Hayes Awards.

==== 2016: Cost of Living ====
Cost of Living, for which Martyna Majok won the Pulitzer Prize for Drama, premiered at the Williamstown Theatre Festival in 2016, and then transferred Off-Broadway in a Manhattan Theatre Club production at City Center in June and July 2017. The drama includes Eddie and Ani – an ex-truck driver and his wife who is quadriplegic, John – a witty doctoral student with cerebral palsy, and Jess – his over-worked caregiver. Cost of Living began its life as a one-act called John, who’s here from Cambridge which premiered in 2015, and was expanded and renamed. Majok dedicated the play to her grandfather who died in 2012.

So the first of many great things about Martyna Majok’s Cost of Living [...] is the way it slams the door on uplifting stereotypes. [...] What Ms. Majok most successfully dramatizes are workarounds: not just the kind that a person in a wheelchair must devise but the kind that anyone must. Race and class and temperament come into it, all interlaced. [...] If you don’t find yourself in someone onstage in Cost of Living you’re not looking.

— Jesse Green, "Review: In ‘Cost of Living’, a Familiar Alienation", N.Y. Times critic's pick (June 7, 2017)

Cost of Living received its West Coast premiere at the Fountain Theatre in November 2018, British premiere in January and Polish premiere in March 2019.

The play won Outstanding New Play at the 2018 Lucille Lortel Awards (tied with Jocelyn Bioh's School Girls: Or, The African Mean Girls Play), Edgerton New Play Prize, The Kennedy Center's Jean Kennedy Smith Award, and the Women's Invitational Prize, among others. It was nominated for the 2018 Outer Critics Circle Award for Outstanding New Off-Broadway Play. Both performances were directed by Jo Bonney, who was nominated for Outstanding Director of a Play at the Outer Critics Circle Awards. They also both featured actors with disabilities – Katy Sullivan as Ani, who was nominated for a Lucille Lortel award and Outer Critics Circle Award for her performance, and Gregg Mozgala who portrayed John. Mozgala was nominated for a Drama Desk Award and Outer Critics Circle Award and won a Lucille Lortel award for his performance.

==== 2018: Queens ====
On 5 March 2018, Majok's production of Queens (stylized queens) premiered Off-Broadway at the Lincoln Center's LCT3/Claire Tow Theater. The story centers around a group of immigrant women which come from different countries and live in an illegal basement apartment in Queens, New York. It featured direction by Dayna Taymor, scenic design by Laura Jellinek, costumes by Kaye Voyce, lighting by Matt Frey, and sound by Stowe Nelson. It closed on March 25, 2018. The cast included Jessica Love, Nadine Malouf, Ana Reeder, Andrea Syglowski, Zuzanna Szadkowski, Sarah Tolan-Mee, and Nicole Villamil. Before its premiere, the play spent two summers in development workshops. The first summer (2016), it was the WildWind Performance Lab of Texas Tech University School of Theatre and Dance, and the next summer, these were The Ground Floor at the Berkeley Repertory Theatre and the Eugene O'Neill Theater Center's National Playwrights Conference.

This time Jesse Green of The New York Times called Majok's play a "knockout". Queens received West Coast premiere at the La Jolla Playhouse in July 2018, in a new two-act version. The play is being developed into a series for HBO.

A further revised version of Queens began previews Off-Broadway at Manhattan Theatre Club on October 15, 2025, and opened on November 5. Now directed by Trip Cullman, the production stars Anna Chlumsky, Julia Lester and Marin Ireland, alongside Sharlene Cruz, Brooke Bloom, and Syglowski, Malouf, and Villamil reprising their roles.

==== 2020: Sanctuary City ====
Sanctuary City, a play produced by New York Theatre Workshop "that blends the personal and political in its depiction of a newly naturalized teenager who decides to marry her undocumented best friend so he can remain in the country", had a short Off-Broadway engagement in 2020. Previews started on 4 March at the Lucille Lortel Theatre, and it was set to open on 24 March, but the run was suspended due to the city-wide shutdown amidst the COVID-19 pandemic. The production was directed by Rebecca Frecknall and designed by Tom Scutt, Mikaal Sulaiman, and Isabella Byrd. The cast consisted of Jasai Chase Owens, Sharlene Cruz, and Austin Smith. The stage management team was Merrick A.B. Williams and Veronica Lee. The production officially opened on September 21, 2021.

The project received an Edgerton Foundation New Play Award, and was supported by a Laurents/Hatcher Foundation Theater Development Grant and in part by the National Endowment for the Arts.

== Awards and honors ==
Majok's awards include:

- 2007 UChicago's the Olga and Paul Menn Foundation Prize in Playwriting
- 2011 and 2018 Jane Chambers Feminist Playwriting Prize
- Champions of Change Award from the NYC Mayor's Office
- Lilly Awards' Stacey Mindich Prize
- American Theatre Critics Association's Francesca Primus Prize
- 2013 National New Play Network's Smith Prize for Political Playwriting – Ironbound
- Aurora Theatre's Global Age Project Prize – Ironbound
- 2014 Marin Theatre's David Calicchio Emerging American Playwright Prize – Ironbound
- 2016 Helen Hayes Awards' Charles MacArthur Award for Outstanding Original New Play or Musical – Ironbound
- 2016 Helen Merrill Emerging Playwright Award
- 2016 Edgerton Foundation New Play Award – Cost of Living
- The Kennedy Center's Jean Kennedy Smith Award – Cost of Living
- Ashland New Plays Festival Women's Invitational Prize – Cost of Living
- 2017 Dramatists Guild's Lanford Wilson Award
- 2018 Pulitzer Prize for Drama – Cost of Living
- 2018 Lucille Lortel Award for Outstanding New Play – Cost of Living
- 2019 Edgerton Foundation New Play Award – Sanctuary City
