= Mandy Greenfield =

American artistic director

- Education: Yale University
- Occupation: Theatre producer

Mandy Greenfield is an American theatre producer.

== Early life ==
Greenfield grew up in Miami. She attended high school at New World School of the Arts before attending Yale University.

== Career ==
=== Early career ===
From 1998 until 2001, Greenfield was the Producer of the Blue Light Theater Company where she produced several premieres, including Darko Tresnjak's Princess Turandot (which subsequently ran at the Westport Country Playhouse) and Daniel Goldfarb's Adam Baum and the Jew Movie starring Ron Leibman, which won the 1999–2000 Newsday Oppenheimer Award for Best New York Debut. She also produced works for Blue Light by Jessica Goldberg, Helen Edmundson and Philip Ridley.

=== Manhattan Theatre Club ===
Greenfield worked at Manhattan Theatre Club from 2003 to 2014, and served as MTC's Artistic Producer from 2011 to 2014. She produced shows at both The Samuel J. Friedman Theatre on Broadway and New York City Center off-Broadway. Notable productions include Benjamin Scheuer's The Lion, Tarell Alvin McCraney's Choir Boy, Nell Benjamin's The Explorer's Club, Julia Jordan and Juliana Nash's Murder Ballad, Matthew Lopez's The Whipping Man, David Lindsay-Abaire's Good People, Rabbit Hole, Lynn Nottage’s Ruined, Theresa Rebeck's Mauritius, and John Patrick Shanley’s Doubt.

In 2006, Greenfield’s essay "First-Person Singular: Female Writers Embrace the One-Person Play," appeared in Women Writing Plays: three decades of the Susan Smith Blackburn Prize, published by the University of Texas Press.

She was a judge of The Susan Smith Blackburn Prize in 2012 and 2013.

=== Williamstown Theatre Festival ===
Greenfield joined the Festival in the fall of 2014. She established a New Play Commissioning Program, a community-immersive theatre initiative, and a Playwright-in-Residence position.

Greenfield is an Artistic Advisor to The Relentless Award, given in honor of the late Philip Seymour Hoffman. In 2017, Greenfield was awarded the Giant in the Theater Award by the Lilly Awards. In 2018, Greenfield joined the board of The Lilly Award Foundation.

During Greenfield's tenure the Festival produced Martyna Majok's Cost of Living; the Festival production transferred off-Broadway to Manhattan Theatre Club.

In 2020, during the COVID-19 pandemic, the Festival's in-person season was cancelled and instead recorded for Audible. During this season Greenfield "aggressively dismantled the existing training program," an Apprentice program which charged participants, mostly actors fresh out of college, several thousand dollars; and which had long required Apprentices to perform extensive manual labor. Greenfield reportedly celebrated the change, commenting, "now you don’t have to coordinate their education."

In 2021, the sound crew of the musical Row walked out of a tech rehearsal citing low pay, unsafe working conditions, and an unreasonable work schedule. Following the season, the Los Angeles Times reported on the theater's "broken culture." Reports included numerous staff and crew complaints about Greenfield's management: belittling subordinates "as if they had no skills or industry experience," demanding responses to text messages at late hours, and refusal to end the Festival's "80- to 100-hour weeks" "with no rest periods or scheduled days off."

Following these labor controversies, Greenfield resigned in late October 2021.

== Personal life ==
Greenfield lives in Brooklyn, and is married with two sons.
