= Lilly Awards =

American award ceremony for women in theatre

Lilly Award
- Awarded for: Excellence for Women in Theatre, including Playwrights, Actors, Designers, Producers and Others
- Country: United States
- Presented by: The Lilly Award Foundation
- First award: 2010
- Website: https://the-lillys.org

The Lilly Awards are an American awards ceremony recognizing extraordinary women in theatre. An annual celebration is held in New York to honor female writers, composers, directors, designers, producers and advocates. Some men have also been awarded the Miss Lilly, a prize in recognition of their advocacy for women in a male-dominated industry. Named after Lillian Hellman, the Lilly Awards were founded in 2010 by the playwrights Julia Jordan, Marsha Norman and Theresa Rebeck. Marsha Norman is a Pulitzer Prize and Tony-award winning playwright, whose work includes the book of the musical The Color Purple and book and lyrics of The Secret Garden.

The Lillys promote the work of women in theatre by partnering with the Dramatists Guild to produce The Count, the first study of its kind to measure the data of the theatre industry and investigate the lack of gender parity in American theatre. Between 2011-2014, in a study sampling 2,508 productions in American theatres, only 22% of the plays and musicals produced in America were written by women.

By 2018, there have been a few notable attempts to draw the attention of theatres to the work of American female playwrights, including LA-based group, The Kilroys, who founded an annual industry-based survey of excellent female and trans playwrights' work in 2013.

Previous Lilly Award winners include Annie Baker, who won the 2014 Pulitzer Prize for Drama for her play The Flick, Lynn Nottage, who won the 2017 Pulitzer Prize for Sweat, Martyna Majok, who won the 2018 Pulitzer Prize for her play Cost of Living, and Jeanine Tesori, who is the most recognised female composer in history with five Broadway musicals and five Tony Award Nominations, including the 2015 Tony Award for Best Original Score for Fun Home.

== Feminism at the Lillys ==
Many of Broadway and Off-Broadway's leading actors have given speeches at the Lilly Awards highlighting the experiences of women working in the male-dominated theatre. These speeches often acknowledge the forces of misogyny, racism and patriarchy, while encouraging the mission of the Lillys to highlight women in theatre. Presenters at the Lillys have included:

- Feminist activist Gloria Steinem
- Broadway playwright and TV writer Theresa Rebeck
- Actor, singer and songwriter Amanda Green (Tony Award for Best Original Score, Hands on a Hardbody)

In a speech at the 8th annual Lilly Awards ceremony, playwright Sarah Ruhl said:

"I want to thank all of you and celebrate the work of other women in the theatre this year—you’ve inspired me, you’ve lit the way. And I have faith—there will come a time when the public humiliation that every artist must endure will be spread out equally over both genders, and will be leveled equally by both genders. And if that kind of equity does not in itself seem something to celebrate, let’s celebrate how we get there—by invoking our mothers, by refusing to shut up, and by making our own fun."

At the 2018 Lilly Awards, after being recognized with the "You've Changed The World" Award, playwright Eve Ensler said:

"I hope it will be a lot easier for you than it was for me and women of my generation, but racist patriarchy is a persistent and devious system of oppression. It is far more tenacious and relentless than I had imagined.

There are many things that will drive you mad as women playwrights. Plays that get diminished by being called a woman’s play, as if that’s an insult. We never call male driven plays, men’s plays. We call them plays. Because men are still seen as the drivers of the world. When I wrote The Vagina Monologues, journalists were constantly asking me with a kind of pity, how I felt that only women come to my show. I would say, “Only women? You mean 51% of the population? Thank you, women.”

They will tell you your work isn’t commercial and that is code for, “isn’t written by a white man,” or “pure entertainment.” And to be honest, no one really has a bloody idea what will become commercial—meaning what play will attract a large audience. It has to do with timing, the political and cultural climate, and tapping into an invisible zeitgeist. I can’t tell you how many times I was told no one would come to see a play about vaginas, that it was professional suicide, that I would be marginalized and exiled."

== Broadway Cabaret ==
The Lilly Awards hosts a Broadway Cabaret, a 24 Hour Plays event, and occasionally, 24 Hour Musicals.

== Recipients ==
Date	Prize	Winner	Discipline
2023	The Stacey Mindich ''Go Write a Play'' Award	Kirsten Greenidge	Playwright
2023	The Stacey Mindich ''Go Write a Musical'' Award	Georgia Stitt	Musician
2023	The “Thank You for Building the most Deeply Cool Rockstar of a Theater” Award	Susan Feldman	Artistic Director
2023	Miss Lilly	Clint Ramos	Creative Director
2023	The “She, Herself, Persists” Award	Jacquelyn Reingold	Playwright
2023	The ''Broadway Big Wig'' Award	Cookie Jordan	Designer
2023	The “Sister Supreme” Award	Liza Colon-Zayas	Actress, Playwright
2023	The “Angel of American Theater” Award	Kathleen Chalfant	Actress
2023	The “Representing in a Big Way'' Award	Ruthie Ann Miles	Actress
2023	The “She is Doing it all Because She Damn Well Can” Award	Sophina Brown	Actress
2023	The “Slapstick Soprano Saint“	Laura Benanti	Actress
2022	The Stacey Mindich 'Go Write a Play' Award	Zora Howard	Writer, Director, Producer
2022	The Stacey Mindich 'Go Write A Musical' Award	Imani Uzuri	Singer Songwriter
2022	The Stacey Mindich 'Go Work in Theater' Award	K. Hernandez Friend, Madelyn Paquette, Liza Jessie Peterson, Kara Young, April Mathis, Laiona Michelle	Various
2022	The Lily Fan Director Award	Mei Ann Teo	Director
2022	Honorary Lilly Award	Stacey Mindich	Producer
	Miss Lilly	Brian Blythe, John Kristiansen	Costume Industry Coalition
2021	The Stacey Mindich 'Go Write a Play' Award	C.A. Johnson	Playwright
2021	The Stacey Mindich 'Go Write A Musical' Award	Crystal Monee Hall	Composer, Lyricist
2021	The Stacey Mindich 'Go Work in Theater' Award	Brigit Huppuch, Kimie Nishikawa, Machel Ross, Stephanie Rolland, Victoria Detres	Various
2021	The Lorraine Hansberry Award	France-Luce Benson	Playwright
2021	Daryl Roth Creative Spirit Award	Itohan Edoloyi	Lighting Designer
2020	Lifetime Achievement Award	Emily Mann	Director
2020	The Stacey Mindich 'Go Write A Play' Award	Antoinette Nwandu	Playwright
2020	The Stacey Mindich 'Go Write A Musical' Award	Kirsten Childs	Playwright, Composer, Lyricist
2020	The Stacey Mindich 'Go Work in Theater' Award	Whitney White, Jillian Walker, Donnetta Lavinia Grays, Stacey Rose, and Nikkole Salter	Various
2020	NYWF Director's Apprenticeship Award	Melissa Crespo	Director
2020	Lilly Award	Natyna Bean and Stevie Walker-Webb	Playwright and Director
2020	Miss Lilly Award	Tom Kirdahy	Producer
2020	Daryl Roth Creative Spirit Award	Sarita P. Fellows	Costume Designer
2020	Williamstown Theatre Festival Commission	Erika Dickerson-Despenza	Playwright
2019	The "Badass Saint of Theatre" Award	LaTanya Richardson Jackson	Actor
2019	Lilly Award	Glenda May Jackson CBE	Actor and British Under-Secretary of State for Transport
2019	The "Ace in the Hole" Award	Jayne Houdyshell	Actor
2019	Williamstown Theatre Festival Commission	Dawn Landes	Singer-songwriter
2019	The Stacey Mindich 'Go Write a Musical' Award	Masi Asare	Playwright, Composer, Lyricist
2019	The 'Thank God You Got Us All Started, and Then Kept Us Going' Award	Gretchen Cryer and Nancy Ford	Composer and Lyricist
2019	The Daryl Roth Creative Spirit Award	You-Shin Chen	Scenic designer
2019	The Daryl Roth/Atlantic Theater Technical Apprentices	Jasmine Lesane and Taylor Lilly	Lighting Designers
2019	NYWF Director's Apprenticeship	Victoria Davidjohn	Director
2019	Leah Ryan's FEWW Award	Eliana Pipes	Playwright
2019	The 'Aubergine is a F***ing Masterpiece' Award	Julia Cho	Playwright
2019	The 'Because You've Deserved It For Ages and We've Been Planning This All Along' Award	Constance Congdon	Playwright and Librettist
2019	The 'Aubergine is a F***ing Masterpiece' Award	Julia Cho	Playwright
2019	The Stacey Mindich 'Go Write A Play' Award	Madeleine George	Playwright
2019	The Miss Lilly Award	Oliver Butler	Director
2018	Mixed Martial Arts Award	Monica Bill Barnes and Anna Bass	Performers
2018	You’ve Changed the World Award	Eve Ensler	Playwright
2018	F It, I’m Going to Say It Award	Lori Myers	Actor
2018	Williamstown Theatre Festival ‘With The Females’ Award	Jocelyn Bioh	Playwright
2018	Leah Ryan Prize	Gina Femia	Playwright
2018	Daryl Roth Creative Spirit Award	Stacey Derosier	Designer
2018	Producer of the Year Award	Carole Rothman	Producer
2018	The New York Women’s Foundation Directing Apprenticeship Award	Abigail Jean-Baptiste	Director
2018	Mom of the Year Award	Kelda Roys	Lawyer and politician
2018	Stacey Mindich “Go Write a Play" Award	Jen Silverman	Playwright
2018	Stacey Mindich “Go Write a Musical" Award	Emily Gardner Xu Hall	Composer
2018	Lilly Award	Hannah Gadsby	Comedian
2018	Miss Lilly Award	Robert Saenz de Viteri, P. Carl, and Ralph Sevush	
2017	Legendary Lilly Award	Julie Taymor	Director
2017	Giant in the Theatre Award	Mandy Greenfield	Producer, Artistic Director
2017	The Breakthrough Lilly Award	Denée Benton, Beanie Feldstein, and Madison Ferris	Actor
2017	Mistress of Costume Design Award	Toni-Leslie James	Designer
2017	Leah Ryan Prize	Susan Soon He Stanton	Playwright
2017	Daryl Roth Creative Spirit Award	Ari Fulton	Designer
2017	New York Women’s Foundation Directing Apprenticeship Award	Jenny Koons	Director
2017	Stacey Mindich “Go Write a Play" Award	Martyna Majok	Playwright
2017	Harper Lee Award	Christina Anderson	Playwright
2017	Lifetime Achievement Lilly Award	Micki Grant	
2017	Miss Lilly Award	Stephen Schwartz	
2016	The First International Lilly Award	Waking the Feminists (Ireland)	Social activism
2016	Stacey Mindich “Go Write a Play" Award	Rehana Lew Mirza	Playwright
2016	Lilly Award in Playwriting	Danai Gurira	Playwright
2016	Lilly Award in Acting	Jessie Mueller	Actor
2016	Lilly Award in Directing	Kate Whoriskey	Director
2016	Leah Ryan Prize	Gemma Murphy	Playwright
2016	Lilly Award in Activism	Kathy Najimy	Actor & activist
2016	Lilly Award in Trailblazing	Mia Katigbak	Actor
2015	Legendary Lilly Award	Chita Rivera	Actor
2015	Lilly Composer Award	Diedre Murray	Composer
2015	Lifetime Achievement Award	Daryl Roth	Producer
2015	Lilly Award in Playwriting	Lisa D'Amour	Playwright
2015	Leah Ryan Prize	Boo Killebrew	Playwright
2015	Lilly Award for Working Miracles	Shakina Nayfack	Actor, artistic director
2015	Lilly Award in Acting	Quincy Tyler Bernstine	Actor
2015	Miss Lilly Award	Jim Nicola	Artistic director
2015	Mizz Lilly Award	Linda Chapman	Artistic director
2015	Stacey Mindich "Go Write A Play" Award	Heidi Schreck	Playwright
2015	Lilly Award in Choreography	Graciela Daniele	Choreographer
2015	Lilly Award for Distinguished Service to Playwrights	Deidre O'Connell	Actor
2014	Lorraine Hansberry Award	Billie Allen	Actor
2014	Lilly Award in Playwriting	Dominique Morisseau	Actor
2014	Lilly Award in Lyric writing	Kristen Anderson-Lopez	Lyricist
2014	Lilly Award for Composing	Jeanine Tesori	Composer
2014	Lilly Award for Music Direction	Mary-Mitchell Campbell	Music director
2014	Lilly Award for Performance	Kelli O'Hara, Johanna Day, Rebecca Naomi Jones	Actor
2014	Lilly Award for Producing	Susan Bernfield	Producer
2014	Lilly Award for Directing	Liesl Tommy	Director
2014	Lilly Award for an Agent	Joyce Ketay	Agent
2014	Leah Ryan Prize	Jen Silverman	Playwright
2014	Stacey Mindich "Go Write A Play" Award	Neena Beber	Playwright
2014	Miss Lilly Award	Todd London	Artistic director
2014	Lifetime Achievement Award	Winnie Holzman	Dramatist & screenwriter
2013	Lilly Award Commission	Tanya Barfield	Playwright
2013	Leah Ryan Prize	Jiehae Park	Playwright
2012	Lifetime Achievement Award	Tina Howe	Playwright
2012	Lilly Award for Playwriting	Leslye Headland	Playwright
2012	Lilly Award for Playwriting	Katori Hall	Playwright
2011	Lilly Award for Playwriting	Lynn Nottage	Playwright
2011	Lilly Award for Playwriting	Lisa Kron	Playwright
2011	Lilly Award for Playwriting	Amy Herzog	Playwright
2010	Lilly Award for Playwriting	Melissa James Gibson	Playwright
2010	Lilly Award for Playwriting	Liz Duffy Adams	Playwright
2010	Lilly Award for Playwriting	Deborah Zoe Laufer	Playwright
2010	Lilly Award for Playwriting	Chisa Hutchinson	Playwright
2010	Lilly Award for Playwriting	Lucy Thurber	Playwright
2010	Lilly Award for Playwriting & Directing	Young Jean Lee	Playwright & Director
2010	Lilly Award for Playwriting	Sarah Ruhl	Playwright
2010	Lilly Award for Playwriting	Annie Baker	Playwright
2010	Lilly Award for Advocacy	Emily Morse	Artistic Director
2010	Lilly Award for Design	Christine Jones	Designer
2010	Lilly Award for Directing	Anne Kauffman	Director
2010	Lifetime Achievement Lilly Award	Mary Rodgers	Composer, author, screenwriter
