= WCCW =

WCCW might refer to:

- WCCW (AM), a radio station at 1310 AM licensed to Traverse City, Michigan
- WCCW-FM, a radio station at 107.5 FM licensed to Traverse City, Michigan
- World Class Championship Wrestling, defunct professional wrestling promotion based in Texas which went out of business in 1990
- Women's Center for Creative Work, is a network of women based in Los Angeles who promote art and feminism.
- Washington Corrections Center for Women, a woman's prison in Gig Harbor, Washington
