= Working Man's Clothes =

Working Man's Clothes

Working Man's Clothes Productions is a New York City theater company that was founded in January 2005. It is a sponsored project of Fractured Atlas. It has won a number of awards including IT-Awards. The company name was taken from a line of Ralph Waldo Emerson, "Common sense is genius dressed in working man's clothes." The company focuses on new works by emerging playwrights. The company has produced at such venues as 59East59, Under St. Mark's, Gene Frankel Theatre, and The Ohio Theatre in SoHo. The company is a member of OOBCOM, a community of Off-Off Broadway Theatre Artists.

== Artists ==
=== Founding Members ===
- Isaac Byrne
- Jared Culverhouse
- Amanda Hamilton
- Bekah Brunstetter
- Michael Mason

=== Artistic Council ===
- Jared Culverhouse
- Darcie Champagne
- Adam Belvo
- Terry Jenkins

== Productions ==
- She Like Girls by Chisa Hutchinson (2009)
- Fresh Kills by Elyzabeth Gregory Wilder
- Pulling Teeth by Brandon Koebernick (2005)
- To Nineveh: A Modern Miracle Play by Bekah Brunstetter (2005)
- Men Eat Mars Bars While Touching Their Penis by Jennifer Slack-Eaton (2006)
- Many Worlds by William Borden
- Penetrator by Anthony Neilson
- I Used To Write On Walls by Bekah Brunstetter (2007)
- Intercourse by Brandon Koebernick (2005)
- The Marvelous Misadventures of William Zzylk by John Paul DeSena
- Green by Bekah Brunstetter
- Playoff Picture by John Paul DeSena
- Boop by John Paul DeSena (2006)
- Hill by Amy Schulz
- Arms by Bekah Brunstetter (2006)
- Oceanside Parkway by Eric Sanders (2006)
- Tremble by Dan Basila,: Happy Birthday / I'm Dead by Bekah Brunstetter
- Azucar by Jon Key
- Restaurants at Beautiful Times by Dave McGinnis
- Oblivia by Eric Sanders
- Bloody Elephants by Casey Wimpee (2006)
- The Impotence of Being Ernest by Joshua Hill
- Marriage Play by Bekah Brunstetter
- Arms and the Octopus by Casey Wimpee (2007)
- Atlas, or Constellation Golf, by Casey Wimpee (2007)
- Wood by Justin Cooper (2007)
- Sharpen My Dick by Greg Romero (2007)
- Candy Room by William Charles Meny (2007)
- The Saddest Thing in the History of the World by Kyle Jarrow (2007)
- 1.1-1.7 by Eric Sanders
- Charlie Amsterdam's Wine Tasting Kick-Off
- My Shoes Are In Secaucus by Jennie Eng
- Carla Rhodes and Cecil
- Empty by Kyle Jarrow
- V-Low's Meat Market vs. Nico & the Astronaut
- Wanting It by Libby Emmons
- Stumblebum Brass Band
- Hot Damn by Casey Wimpee (2007)
- Cudzoo
- Not So Bad Once You Get Used To It by John Paul DeSena
- Greg Walloch
- Clay McLeod Chapman
- Lords of Chaos by Eric Sanders
- Lil Miss Lixx burlesque
- Scarlet O'Gasm burlesque
- New York Is Dead
- 5 Boroughs on Fire
- The Wooster Wake
- Abandon All Hope

== Awards and nominations ==
- 2007 New York Innovative Theatre Awards
  - Nomination, Outstanding Original Short Script - Justin Cooper, "Wood" - fuckplays
  - Nomination, Outstanding Original Short Script - Casey Wimpee, "Arms and the Octopus" - fuckplays
  - Nomination, Outstanding Actor in a Leading Role - Julian James Muhammed, fuckplays
- 2006 New York Innovative Theatre Awards
  - Outstanding Ensemble, Outstanding Director, Outstanding Sound Design, Outstanding Original Full-length Script, Outstanding Production of a Play "To Nineveh: A Modern Miracle", Working Man's Clothes - Isaac Byrne, Amanda Hamilton, Paul DeSena, David Carr-Berry, Jared Culverhouse, Ellen David, Paul Fears, Andaye' Hill, Julian James, Gregory Porter Miller & Brian Schlanger.
- 2010 GLAAD Media Awards
  - Winner Outstanding New York Theater: Off Off Broadway- "She Like Girls" by Chisa Hutchinson

== Programs ==
The company is well known for its developmental series, which has workshopped staged readings of numerous plays including Boom Vang by Larry Pontius, Breath and Grandma's Box, The Life of Mary Berry, Double Hernia by Mark Charney, Handicapping by James McClindon, 37 Stones by Mark Charney, Night by David Carr-Berry, The Woodpecker by Samuel Brett Williams, "The Authorities" by Andrew Rosendorf, Heartless by Eric Sanders, "She Like Girls" by Chisa Hutchinson.

In May 2007 the company launched its Lost Works Series with the New York City premiere of Anthony Neilson's Penetrator.
