= Callie Kimball =

American playwright and teacher

Callie Kimball is a US-based playwright and educator. Her works include the plays Sofonisba, Perserverance, and Things That Are Round.

Kimball's plays are feminist in nature and cover topics such as power dynamics, emotional violence, and parasitic relationships. She has written historical dramas, classical adaptations, sociopolitical comedies, and futuristic dystopian dramas. Her plays often feature characters trying to break free from societal assumptions around gender, class, and race. Her plays have been performed in New York, Chicago, Los Angeles, and DC. She is a former MacDowell Fellow and won the Clauder Competition's Gold Prize for her play Sofonisba. Kimball is currently a visiting assistant professor of theater at Middlebury College, in Vermont where she teaches playwriting.

== Early life and education ==
Kimball earned her Bachelor of Arts from the College of William and Mary. She received her Master of Fine Arts in playwriting under her mentor Tina Howe at Hunter College, where she was a two-time winner of the Rita & Burton Goldberg Playwriting Award.

== Career ==
Her works include the plays Sofonisba, Perserverance, and Things That Are Round. Kimball's plays are feminist in nature and cover topics such as power dynamics, emotional violence, and parasitic relationships. She has written historical dramas, classical adaptations, sociopolitical comedies, and futuristic dystopian dramas. Her plays often feature characters trying to break free from societal assumptions around gender, class, and race.

Her plays have been produced and performed in New York, Chicago, Los Angeles, and DC.

Kimball produced the play Perseverance in 2021 when it was commissioned by the Maine Suffrage Centennial Collaborative to commemorate the centennial of women’s suffrage. The play follows two fictional women occupying the same house 100 years apart: in 1920 a Black schoolteacher, writer, and suffragist named Perseverance Turner; and in 2020 a white schoolteacher running for office named Dawn Davis. The women are connected across time when Dawn Davis discovers Perseverance's letters in the cellar, and questions are raised about the intersections of gender, class and race, as well as who gets to have ownership over history. The world premiere of Perseverance took place in 2021 at Portland Stage in Portland, ME.

After teaching as a visiting professor at Bates College in Maine for a couple years, Kimball is currently a visiting assistant professor of theater at Middlebury College, in Vermont where she teaches playwriting.

== Personal life ==
Kimball has spoken candidly about having her life and career upended by a traumatic brain injury in 2018. In the years following her injury, she struggled with her memory and found herself unable to write. Kimball has described an early neuropsych evaluation where the doctor asked her to list as many animals as she could:

“I said, dog, cat – and then there was a long, long pause, and I said, ‘ocelot.’ The guy cracked up. He said, ‘I have never heard that one. Clearly you have a large vocabulary, but are having a hard time accessing it.’ ”

As part of her healing process, Kimball began growing dahlias. By 2021, she was able to start her own small-scale dahlia farm. She now grows and sells dahlias alongside her writing and teaching careers.

== List of Plays ==
- Sofonisba - world premiere at Theater at Monmouth 2022.
- Perseverance - world premiere at Portland Stage 2021.
- Things That Are Round - world premiere at Rep Stage in Columbia, MD 2018.
- Alligator Road
- Rush
- Dreams of the Penny Gods
- MAY 39th
- Jenny1538

== Awards and honors ==
Kimball's awards include:

- 2006 MacDowell Fellow
- 2012 Hunter College Rita & Burton Goldberg Playwriting Award (two years in a row)
- Ludwig Vogelstein grant – Sofonisba
- 2016 O'Neill finalist – Sofonisba
- 2016 Clauder Gold Prize winner – Sofonisba
- 2016 Princess Grace Award semifinalist – Sofonisba
- 2016 The Kilroys' List – Sofonisba
