= Jess Imme =

Salvadoran-American singer and musician

Jess Imme is a Salvadoran-American singer and musician from Los Angeles, California.

Primarily self-taught, she has recorded and performed with bands including Big Moves and Professor Possessor, drawing attention from critics for her "one-of-a-kind" "clarion vocals". She is also known for collaborations with DJ Hoppa and playwright Gina Young, having appeared as the drummer in Young's musical play sSISTERSs, and also appearing as a singer who "serenades the audience with songs by Chavela Vargas and k.d. lang" in Young's production of Butch Ballet at REDCAT.
