= The Kilroys' List =

Annual listing of up-and-coming female and trans playrwrights

The Kilroys' List is a gender parity initiative to end the "systematic underrepresentation of female and trans playwrights" in the American theater industry. Gender disparity is defined as the gap of unproduced playwrights' whose plays are being discriminated against based on the writer's gender identification and intersectional identities of race, sexual orientation, ethnicity, socioeconomic class, age, and ability. Recent statistical research released in November 2015, entitled The Count, gathered that 22% of total surveyed professional productions from 2011-2013 annual seasons were written by women playwrights, 3.8% of the total were written by women playwrights of color, and 0.4% of the total were written by foreign women playwrights of color. 78% of total surveyed professional productions were written by men playwrights.

First released in June 2014, the list is an annual collection of highly recommended contemporary plays written by female and trans* authors, which are read or seen by an industry professional within the last twelve months. The list was established by The Kilroys, a group of Los Angeles-based female-identified playwrights and producers who were tired of their plays remaining unproduced while artistic directors claimed "We chose the best plays" for their theater companies' annual seasons. The namesake of The Kilroys originated from the World War II graffiti tag, "Kilroy Was Here." The tagline for The Kilroys is "We Make Trouble and Plays." The founding Kilroys members were: Zakiyyah Alexander, Bekah Brunstetter, Sheila Callaghan, Carla Ching, Annah Feinberg, Sarah Gubbins, Laura Jacqmin, Chelsea Marcantel, Joy Meads, Kelly Miller, Meg Miroshnik, Daria Polatin, Tanya Saracho, and Marisa Wegrzyn.

In 2018, The Kilroys passed the baton from the founding members to a "new class" of 14 radical theatremakers composed of writers, producers and directors Jaclyn Backhaus, Hilary Bettis, Jennifer Chambers, Claudia de Vasco, Emma Goidel, Christina Ham, Jessica Hanna, Monet Hurst-Mendoza, Obehi Janice, Hansol Jung, Chelsea Marcantel, Caroline V. McGraw, Bianca Sams, and Gina Young.

In 2014 the list featured the Top 46, a collection of 46 plays highly recommended by selected Nominators. The Nominators consisted of a number of contemporary theater artists and administrators currently working in the theater industry.

The 2015 List: The top 7% featured 53 plays.

== Eligibility ==
To qualify as eligible for The List, a play must be:

- "unproduced or have had only a single professional production"
- written by a playwright who self-identifies as female or trans*
- read or seen by an industry professional in the past twelve months
- not included in previous years

== Gender parity ==
Gender Parity is a term that has grown to widespread popularity in the theater industry in recent years. There have been several initiatives started to address the underrepresentation of, and discrimination against, women and trans* artists and administrators. Much of this work has been statistical research based on numbers of women and trans* artists and administrators filing roles within a theater organization's staff and theatrical season.

=== Statistical research and analysis ===
Considered the most recent statistical research and analysis on gender disparity, The Count was founded by playwrights and co-founders of the Lilly Awards, Marsha Norman and Julia Jordan, and Rebecca Stump of the Dramatists Guild. This research was presented at the annual Lilly Awards in July 2015 and published in November 2015 by the |Dramatists Guild.

Theaters that were eligible for survey must be not-for-profit and regional, including Off-Broadway and Off-Off Broadway. Broadway theaters were not included in the survey. In total, 153 theater companies' 2011-2012, 2012-2013, and 2013-2014 seasons were included in the national survey.

Julia Jordan has been quoted saying, "We wanted to create a baseline and to document the change." This baseline consists of percentage breakdowns based on the coined terms, "Unique Writers," which allows each individual produced writer to be counted once within the data, and "Unique Productions," which allows each individual production of a writer's play to be counted once within the data. For instance, while Lynn Nottage is considered a "Unique Writer," each production of her play Intimate Apparel would be considered a "Unique Production." Within these categories, The Count measured representations based on the playwright's self-identified intersections of race, gender, and nationality. These percentages can be seen below in ascending order of percentage:

Unique writers by gender, race, and nationality
0.4% Foreign women of color
0.4% Foreign men of color
2.5% Foreign white women
3.4% American women of color
6.0% American men of color
10.6% Foreign white men
14.0% American white women
62.7% American white men

In addition, The Count included percentage breakdowns by a U.S. regional map and by individual city. Selected cities consisted of:

| Selected cities | Selected cities: productions of female writers | Selected cities: productions of female writers of color |
|---|---|---|
| Portland | 18% | 10.4% |
| Los Angeles | 23% | 17.3% |
| Minneapolis | 23% | 9.1% |
| Seattle | 23% | 4.7% |
| New York | 25% | 15.7% |
| Berkeley | 29% | 11.7% |
| Philadelphia | 29% | 13.1% |
| Kansas City | 30% | 15.6% |
| Washington | 30% | 18.8% |
| Chicago | 36% | 28.4% |

The Count will continue to be updated on an annual basis.

=== Additional gender parity initiatives ===
One of the first initial statistical research and analyses on gender disparity was an honors research project completed by, then Princeton undergraduate student, Emily Glassberg Sands titled, Opening the Curtain on Playwright Gender: An Integrated Economic Analysis of Discrimination in American Theater.

After what has become known as "the Summit"—a gathering of artistic directors and artists in Washington D.C., when an artistic director made a controversial comment about no plays by women in the American theater industry "pipeline"—the We Exist google document was created to document the names of women and trans* playwrights across the world.

Other gender parity initiatives include Theatre Communications Group's 82 Theatre Companies With Playwriting Parity (and Better), published by American Theatre Magazine in September 2015. In addition, there have been formations of citywide Women's Playwriting Festivals such as the 2015 D.C. Women's Voices Theater Festival, which produced 56 new plays by women at 51 theaters across the greater D.C. area, and city-based Gender Parity Task Force Groups. There has also been increased scholarship in uncovering plays by women, for instance Susan Jones's The Other Canon, a list of plays by women that date back 10 centuries.

In addition, there are annual theater awards for recognition of contemporary women playwrights such as the Lilly Awards, named after playwright Lillian Hellman, which was founded in 2010 by playwrights Marsha Norman, Julia Jordan, and Theresa Rebeck, as well as theater companies dedicated to producing work written and directed by women such as the Women's Project Theater.

== New Play Exchange ==
For the 2015 List, the Kilroys partnered with the National New Play Network for their online database, the New Play Exchange. The exchange allows playwrights to create accounts to include their professional work in the form sample pages or full-length plays. The website is an initiative to address how professional theaters can use a more efficient selection process to determine which plays will be produced for their annual seasons. In previous years, "There had been hundreds of conversations about how the submission model was broken, how people filled their offices and built furniture out of unread scripts, how playwrights waited for years to hear back about the plays they just knew were perfect."

In addition to uploading samples pages or full length pages of scripts and musical scores, playwrights can include information on casting breakdowns, keywords, and past production history. Anyone can create profiles to find playwrights, to read and privately evaluate plays, build a "private library," and "watch" others on the New Play Exchange as they add more to their profiles. It will serve as a "tool for students, audiences, and new play lovers everywhere to access new works. It will serve organizations so that they can let playwrights know what they are looking to read, to develop, and to produce."

== Impact of the lists ==
The Kilroys' List has been covered nationwide in newspapers and other online media sources. After the 2014 list was released, the Kilroys were determined to expand the nominating pool "to increase [writer] representation along class, ability, sexual orientation, and gender lines (including genderqueer, trans*, and other non-binary gender identities)."

In June 2015, American Theatre Magazine wrote, "The impact of that initial list is hard to measure precisely, particularly given the long lead times of some theatres’ season planning, but the Kilroys have reported that 28 of the original 47 plays have since been produced, and individual writers cited on the list have reported more interest and requests for their scripts, if not a spate of production commitments." In addition, there have been publicly promoted initiatives to utilize the lists, including a reading series of 3 selected plays from the 2014 List, hosted by the Lilly Awards. Also, playwright Sheila Callaghan is quoted in American Theatre Magazine saying, “A school is doing a class on just the Kilroys plays...That’s part of the movement, too.”

== Notable listees ==
=== 2014 ===
- Christina Anderson: Man in Love
- Tanya Barfield: The Call and Bright Half Life
- Bekah Brunstetter: The Oregon Trail
- Sheila Callaghan: Women Laughing Alone With Salad
- Eliza Clark: Future Thinking
- Larissa FastHorse: What Would Crazy Horse Do?
- Halley Feiffer: I'm Gonna Pray For You So Hard
- Madeleine George: The (Curious Case of the) Watson Intelligence
- Martyna Majok: Ironbound
- Meg Miroshink: The Tall Girls
- Dominique Morisseau: Skeleton Crew
- Theresa Rebeck: Zealot
- Tanya Saracho: The Tenth Muse
- Heidi Schreck: The Consultant and Grand Concourse
- Jackie Sibblies Drury: Really Really Really Really Really
- Jen Silverman: The Moors and The Hunters
- Paula Vogel: Don Juan Comes Home From Iraq
- Timberlake Wertenbaker: Jefferson's Garden
- Anna Ziegler: Boy

=== 2015 ===
- Zakiyyah Alexander and Imani Uzuri: Girl Shakes Loose Her Skin
- Christina Anderson: The Ashes Under Gait City
- Clare Barron: You Got Older and Dirty Crusty
- Hilary Bettis: The Ghosts of Lote Bravo and The History of American Pornography
- Jocelyn Bioh: Nollywood Dreams
- Fernanda Coppel: King Liz
- Lydia R. Diamond: Smart People
- Sarah DeLappe: The Wolves
- Lindsey Ferrentino: Ugly Lies the Bone
- Karen Hartman: Supertrue
- Laura Jacqmin: Residence
- Hansol Jung: Cardboard Piano, No More Sad Things, and Wolf Play (Note: Jung was the playwright in 2015 with the most plays listed on the Kilroys' List.)
- Martyna Majok: Petty Harbour
- Mona Mansour: Unseen
- Honor Molloy, Crackskull Row
- Mary Kathryn Nagle: Manhatta
- Lynn Nottage: Sweat
- Tanya Saracho: Fade
- Jen Silverman: The Roommate
- Charise Castro Smith: Feathers and Teeth
- Susan Soon He Stanton: Today Is My Birthday
- Lucy Thurber: The Insurgents
- Leah Nanako Winkler: Kentucky
- Bess Wohl: Small Mouth Sounds
- Lauren Yee: King of the Yees and The Tiger Among Us
- Stefanie Zadravec: Colony Collapse
- Anna Ziegler: The Last Match

=== 2016 ===
- Clare Barron: Dance Nation
- Jocelyn Bioh: School Girls; or the African Mean Girls Play
- Karen Hartman: Roz and Ray
- Chisa Hutchinson: Somebody's Daughter
- Hansol Jung: Wild Goose Dreams
- Aditi Brennan Kapil: Orange
- Martyna Majok: Cost of Living
- Lenelle Moïse: Merit
- Antoinette Nwandu: Pass Over
- Jen Silverman: Collective Rage: A Play in Five Boops and Wink
- Susan Soon He Stanton: Cygnus
- Lucy Thurber: Transfers
- Marisela Treviño Orta: Wolf at the Door

=== 2017 ===
Note: (Note: The 2017 Kilroys' List featured exclusively women of color.)

- Christina Anderson: How to Catch Creation
- Aziza Barnes: Blks.
- Hilary Bettis: Magic City or Julie in Basel
- Charise Castro Smith: El Huracán
- Carla Ching: Nomad Motel
- Larissa FastHorse: The Thanksgiving Play
- Aleshea Harris: Is God Is
- Chisa Hutchinson: Somebody's Daughter
- Antoinette Nwandu: Breach
- Christina Quintana: Azul
- Kristiana Rae Colón: Florissant & Canfield
- Heather Raffo: Noura
- Susan Soon He Stanton: we, the invisibles
- Leah Nanako Winkler: Two Mile Hollow
- Lauren Yee: Cambodian Rock Band and The Great Leap

=== 2019 ===
Note: (Note: Previously listed playwrights were ineligible for the 2019 list. There was no list in 2018.)

- Audrey Cefaly: Alabaster
- Georgina Escobar: Stoneheart
- Monet Hurst-Mendoza: Torera
- Ana Nogueira: Mask Only
- Erika Dickerson-Despenza: cullud wattah and [hieroglyph]
