= Chelsea Marcantel =

American playwright and director (born ca. 1985)

- Education: Louisiana State University, The Juilliard School
- Occupations: Playwright, Director
- Writing career
- Notable works: Everything is Wonderful, Airness, Tiny Houses, Citizen Detective, The Monster
- Notable awards: M Elizabeth Osborn New Play Award (2018), Richard Rodgers Award for Musical Theatre (2021)

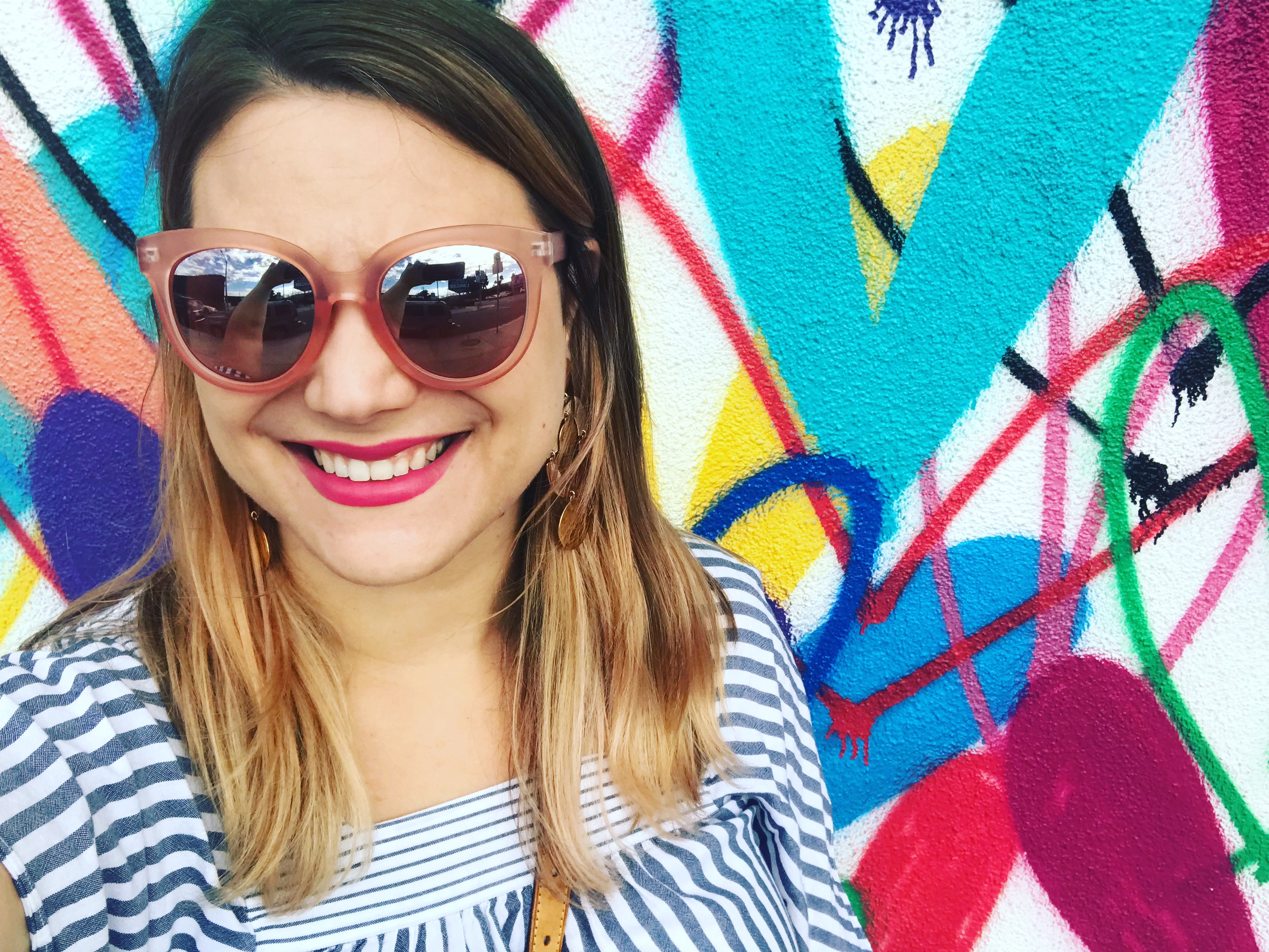
Chelsea Marcantel in Los Angeles in 2018

Chelsea Marcantel is an American playwright and director. She has written over thirty plays. She won the American Theatre Critics Association's M. Elizabeth Osborn New Play Award in 2018 for her play Airness, and a Richard Rodgers Award for Musical Theatre from the American Academy of Arts and Letters for her musical The Monster.

== Early life ==
Marcantel is originally from Jennings, Louisiana, the daughter of Greg and Jean Marcantel. Marcantel has two younger siblings. She was involved with the local community theatre as a child. She graduated from Louisiana State University in 2005 with a double major in English and Theatre; she earned a master's degree in English Education in 2006.

== Career ==
=== Theatre ===
Marcantel moved to Chicago after completing her master's degree. She worked in theatre in Chicago and won the Emerging Playwright Award from the Chicago Union League Civic and Arts Foundation. From Chicago, she moved to Virginia where she taught English and playwriting at Emory and Henry College, and taught English and theater at Virginia Intermont College. She was a Lila Acheson Wallace American Playwrights Fellow at the Juilliard School, where she studied under playwrights Marsha Norman and Christopher Durang. She now lives in Los Angeles. She is married to sound designer and composer Miles Polaski.

On July 4, 2010, Marcantel's series The (a)Symmetry Cycle premiered at the Viaduct Theatre in Chicago. The cycle comprises three plays, Numbfeel, Dumbspeak and Blindsight, running a total of about five hours. It follows the same characters through the three plays, several scientists pursuing their careers and love lives, using insights biology, chemistry, and neurology to explore their motivations.

Marcantel's play Devour features Anais, a wealthy young woman charged with the deaths of three of her ex-boyfriends. Anais is a stereotypical "spoiled rich girl," but the play digs past her surface to discover her vulnerability, "[forcing] the audience to care about this socialite-trash." The play premiered at Chicago's 20% Theatre Company in May 2012.

Even Longer and Farther Away premiered at the New Colony at the Den Theatre in Chicago in 2016. In it, Elliot gets snowed in at a small village on the Appalachian Trail. There he discovers part of his family's history among strangers who seem to know a lot about him and his family. Reviewer Chad Bay called it "one part standard-procedure coming-of-age story and one part mystical folklore."

Marcantel's play Everything is Wonderful premiered at the Contemporary American Theater Festival in Shepherdstown, West Virginia in July 2017. In it, an Amish family who loses two children in a car accident invites the driver into their home. The play was inspired by Werner Herzog's documentary From One Second to the Next, which tells the real-life story of an Amish family affected by a similar accident. Writing about a 2019 production, reviewer Tina Collins calls the play "a thoughtful study of Amish life [that] slowly reveals the underlying complexity that characterizes the human condition as a whole." In reviewing a 2019 production of the play at Everyman Theatre, Baltimore Theatre Talk wrote: ""Chelsea Marcantel navigates the outwardly difficult subject with a beautiful balance of wit and raw emotion. Her writing is both entertaining and heartbreaking…. It's a crucial piece of theatre that shouldn't be missed." Everything is Wonderful is published and licensed by Concord Theatricals (formerly Samuel French, Inc).

Marcantel's play Airness debuted at the 2017 Humana Festival of New American Plays at the Actors Theatre of Louisville. The play tells the story of a woman who enters her first air guitar competition, and quickly realizes there is more to this seemingly silly art from than just playing pretend. The Milwaukee Journal Sentinel acclaimed it as the best full-length play of the Humana festival, and other reviews were similarly glowing. Insider Louisville declared it, ""The most fun you will have at the theater this year … to call this play a "crowd pleaser" is a drastic understatement." Allie Fireel commented in an essay for HowlRound that, "Airness stays with the viewer after the last guitar chord has faded because of the way its complex layers ask the question 'what is real?' when it comes to families, groups, and societies." Airness won the American Theatre Critics Association's M. Elizabeth Osborn New Play Award in 2018; the award recognizes an emerging playwright, and carries as $1000 prize. Airness is published and licensed by Playscripts in both its original version, and a high school version.

In 2018, Marcantel became a member of The Kilroys, a group of playwrights and producers working to enhance the recognition of female and trans playwrights. Marcantel said that she is particularly interested in improving visibility for trans and non-binary playwrights, as well as increasing diversity in theatre criticism.

The San Francisco Playhouse commissioned A White Girl's Guide to International Terrorism, which premiered in February 2019. The play follows Blaze, a bored, disaffected teenager in rural Louisiana. Her YouTube videos depicting lesser-known female saints capture the attention of an FBI counter-terrorism agent, and her search for meaning "makes her vulnerable to some dangerous advice." In the play, reviewer Lily Janiak sees an indictment of America's "devoting so many resources to perceived terrorist threats of a particular ethnicity, nationality and gender while we ignore how poverty, downward mobility and social isolation sow the seeds of radicalization right in our heartland."

Also premiering in February 2019 was Marcantel's adaptation of George Bernard Shaw's play St. Joan, performed by the Delaware Theatre Company. The Philadelphia Inquirer reviewer Julia Klein appreciated Marcantel's "fine job of judiciously trimming Shaw's talky text," but found that the "dialogue tends to slow the piece down." Klein and WHYY reviewer Christine Facciolo both note that Marcantel's St. Joan strays further from historical reality than Shaw's original, and does represent a more feminist play than Shaw's. Facciolo notes that the play was timed to coincide with the centennial anniversary of women's suffrage in the United States, but that St. Joan may be a better class hero than a feminist one, "an illiterate peasant girl [who] could rise to determine the fate of nations." Gail Obenreder in Broad Street Review called the adaptation: "Worthy of Shaw... Marcantel seems to fear no peril. Like Joan facing those seemingly insurmountable powers, she has thrown herself quite successfully up against Shaw. ... but GBS still has the best lines and the laughs." Marcantel's version of Saint Joan is published and licensed by Concord Theatricals.

Her play Tiny Houses had a joint premiere with productions at the Cleveland Play House and the Cincinnati Playhouse in the Park in April 2019. The same cast and creative team performed at both locations. The play revolves around a couple, Bodhi and Cath, who have left their jobs in New York City to pursue Bodhi's dream of building a tiny house in Oregon. The plan is for Cath to finance the project and for Bodhi to build the house; but it is soon clear that Bodhi is a Thoreau-quoting dreamer who overestimates his ability to build the house. He describes his blueprints as: "It's 10 percent how-to and 90 percent why-not?" Cath and Bodhi are joined by Bodhi's college roommate Ollie and his high school girlfriend Jevne in a building project that stretches long past the expected three- to four-month timeline, and eventually professional contractor Jeremiah hired to rescue the floundering project. The play explores themes of life complexities in the midst of trying to simplify life, and of what makes a home. Cleveland Plain-Dealer Andrea Simakis reviewer called the play a "perfect, timely comedy." Cincinnati's City Beat magazine said "the confines of a tiny house pressurize the play's entertainment quotient, even if these characters are more caricatures." Tiny Houses is published and licensed by Concord Theatricals.

In addition to her theatre career, Marcantel co-hosted the podcast "Hugging and Learning" with writer Andrew Grigg. The podcast co-hosts watch and discuss "very special episodes" of television shows from the 1970s, 1980s, and 1990s. The podcast began in July 2018. The final episode, #101, was released on December 4, 2020.

In the fall of 2020, when in-person theaters across the world were closed due to the Coronavirus pandemic, Marcantel created, wrote, and directed an online theatrical experience called Citizen Detective, as part of the Geffen Playhouse's "Geffen Stayhouse" virtual theatre initiative. The show, performed entirely on Zoom, simulates a true crime seminar in which audience members are instructed on the finer points of armchair sleuthing by fictional crime novelist Mickie McKittrick – before realizing that Mickie is actually using them to crowdsource a solution to the 100-year-old unsolved murder of William Desmond Taylor. The show opened in November 2020. Citizen Detective garnered a New York Times Critic's Pick, with reviewer Alexis Soloski observing "Marcantel clearly enjoys the online form, neatly juxtaposing the workaday tools of contemporary online culture — polls, slides, breakout rooms, screen sharing, chat, the mute button — with a lurid case nearly a century cold." Maureen Lee Lenker noted in Entertainment Weekly: "All in all, Citizen Detective is a diverting evening, a combination of game night with a theatrical endeavor, that offers some clues as how to execute entertaining interactive virtual theater." The show was extended due to popular demand, closing in February 2021 after 100 performances.

In March 2021, it was announced that Marcantel (along with collaborators Alan Schmuckler and Michael Mahler) had won a 2021 Richard Rodgers Award for Musical Theatre from the American Academy of Arts and Letters. The Award was given for their musical The Monster, a modern reimagining of Frankenstein, which was commissioned by and in development at Chicago Shakespeare Theatre. According to the Academy's press release: "The Monster is a modern-day reimagining of Frankenstein, delving into the original's themes of creation and responsibility. Victoria launches software to bring communities into harmony online: the very first social network. But as the scope of the technology expands, she finds her moral center tested. Deep inside the recesses of the internet, there remains a trace of what makes us human—if only we can find it before our time runs out." In addition to The Monster, Marcantel has several commercial musical theatre projects in development.

In May 2022, Marcantel's play The Upstairs Department received its World Premiere Production at Signature Theatre in Arlington, VA. The three-hander, commissioned by Signature as part of the Heidi Thomas Writers' Initiative, follows the story of Luke, a young man who awakens from a medically-induced coma to find that he can hear the voices of the dead. Grappling with both his newfound gift and the death of his father from COVID, this unlikely medium makes his way to the Spiritualist community of Lily Dale seeking advice and reconciliation with his skeptical sister Colleen, who has come along for the ride. In Lily Dale, they are housed and instructed by a medium and intuitive named Shiloh, whose backstory turns out to be closer to Colleen's than Luke's. Reviews of The Upstairs Department were overall positive, with MD Theatre Guide calling it, "A solid show in need of minor fine tuning... the plot itself is grounded and evocative, especially in its sensitive arc around Luke's treatment of Colleen's queerness and its portrayal of the horrible strangeness of the pandemic." John Stoltenberg of DC Metro Theater Arts favorably compared the play to Airness, writing in his review, "What I knew about Chelsea Marcantel going in was that she's a genius at creating worlds on stage that seem fantastical and fictitious but that are situated in a world that actually exists. That's what she did with Airness, which she set in the world of competitive air-guitar, a kind of axe karaoke where contestants shred the air fiercely to a blasting soundtrack. (Who knew that was a thing?) Marcantel took me to that world, peopled it with characters I could care about, and got my disbelief not just suspended but dissolved." The Upstairs Department marked Signature Theatre's 60th world premiere production.

=== Film and television ===
In 2022, Marcantel was brought on as part of the Walt Disney Animation Story Trust. In this capacity, she collaborated in the development of such films as STRANGE WORLD and WISH, in addition to various other series and features that were in development during 2022 and 2023. As of 2024, Marcantel has projects in various stages of development at both live action and animation studios around Hollywood.

== Plays ==
- Airness, 2017
- (a)Symmetry Cycle [three plays]: Numbfeel, Dumbspeak and Blindsight, 2010
- Beatrice and Beau [short], 2009
- Blood Song: The Story of the Hatfields and the McCoys
- Citizen Detective, 2020
- Climax [short], 2022
- Consumables [short], 2012
- Dealing [short], 2010
- Devour, 2012
- Doppelganged [short], 2011
- Even Longer and Farther Away, 2016
- Everything is Permitted [short], 2013
- Everything is Wonderful, 2017
- Four Faces [short], 2009
- Galatea on God
- G.I.F.T.
- Global [short], 2011
- Heroics! Adventure! [short] (co-written with Andy Grigg), 2013
- Grounded [adaptation], 2015
- A Hipster Christmas Carol [short], 2013
- Ladyish
- Mountains: Great and Small
- Much Louder Than This
- A Place to Land
- Saint Joan [adaptation], 2019
- Stunt
- The Tiniest Sound in Recorded History, 2007
- The Upstairs Department, 2022
- Tiny Houses, 2019
- Vanishing Act, 2019
- Voodoo Chalk Circle, [adaptation] 2011
- A White Girl's Guide to International Terrorism, 2019

== Awards ==
- Emerging Playwright Award, Chicago Union League Civic and Arts Foundation
- Roe Green Award, 2018
- M. Elizabeth Osborn New Play Award, 2018
- The Richard Rodgers Award for Musical Theatre, 2021
