= Caleen Sinnette Jennings =

American actor, director, and playwright

- Education: New York University Tisch School of the Arts; Bennington College
- Occupations: Actor; Director; Playwright

Caleen Sinnette Jennings is an American actor, director, and playwright. She is a professor of performing arts at American University College of Arts and Sciences. Jennings is the author of numerous plays, including the Queens Girl Trilogy, "Queens Girl in the World," "Queens Girl in Africa," and "Queens Girl: Black in the Green Mountains."

== Education ==
Jennings completed a Bachelor of Arts in drama from Bennington College. She earned a master of fine arts in acting from New York University Tisch School of the Arts.

== Career ==
Jennings joined the department of performing arts at American University College of Arts and Sciences in 1989. In 1994, she joined the faculty of the Teaching Shakespeare Institute. At American University, she specializes in playwriting, African American performing arts, Shakespeare performance, and children's theatre. She wrote the semi-autobiographical memoir "Queens Girl in the World." The show debuted at Mosaic Theater Company of DC during the Women's Voices Theater Festival. In 2019, her plays "Queens Girl in the World" and "Queens Girl in Africa" were performed at Everyman Theatre, Baltimore.

== Awards and honors ==
In 2018, Jennings was nominated for a Helen Hayes Award for her show "Queens Girl in Africa." She was nominated for a 2019 Helen Hayes Charles MacArthur Award for Outstanding Original New Play or Musical.
