= Gina Young =

American dramatist

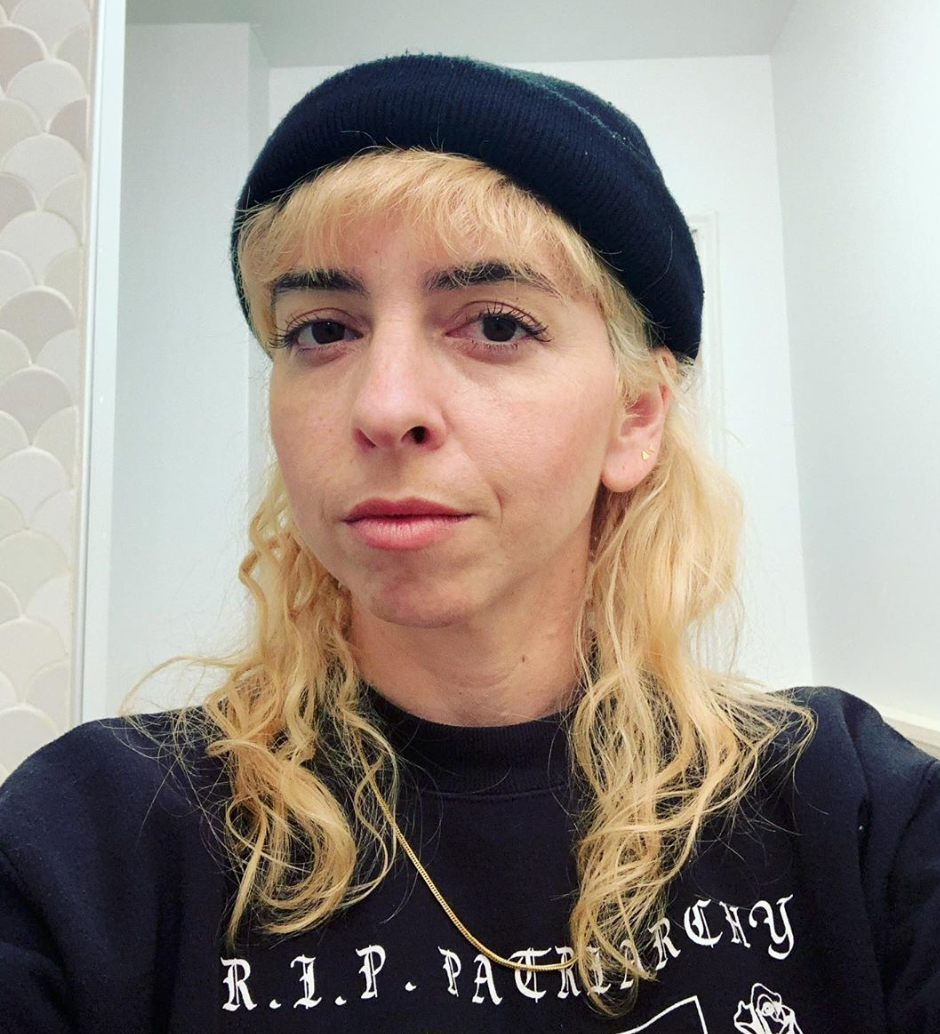
Gina Young in New York City

Gina Young is an American writer, director, playwright, songwriter and performer. She (Note: Young uses she/her and they/them pronouns. This article uses she/her for consistency.) is a member of The Dramatists Guild, The Ring of Keys, and The Kilroys. She is a winner of the HUMANITAS/PLAY LA Prize, and the Jane Chambers Award for Playwriting for their play Femmes: A Tragedy. Her work has been presented by The Museum of Contemporary Art (MOCA), REDCAT, and The Hammer Museum.

== Theatre ==
Young wrote and directed her first plays at the longest-running women's theatre in the United States, the WOW Café Theatre in Manhattan's East Village. Early works all incorporated a live band on stage and included she cuts herself / she likes to write, phone|sex|cancer, and god in a girl. More recent works include Femmes: A Tragedy, a comedy set in the queer femme burlesque scene which is published by NoPassport Press, and sSISTERSs, the story of three sisters who may or may not be witches, which was presented by REDCAT and USC's Visions & Voices Series.

Young's project BUTCH BALLET, presented by REDCAT in the Summer of 2017, is a groundbreaking movement-theater piece created for and with a cast of butch women, trans men and gender nonconforming performers from diverse backgrounds. BUTCH BALLET is still in development into a full-length work.

== Music ==
From 2001-2008, Young toured as a singer/songwriter and released three albums: Intractable, she's so androgynous, and 3am Voice. She was also known for recording and touring with the music and performance art group Team Gina, which disbanded in 2010. She is scheduled to release new music in 2024.

As a performer, Young has been called "hugely talented" and reviews of her performance on the National Tour of the Gay Men's Chorus of Los Angeles' It Gets Better musical said she "captivated the audience with her folksy mezzo sound and easily relatable performance as an actress."

== Film ==
Young's first screenplay to be produced is a short film about a woman alone during the COVID-19 shelter-in-place, titled ROOM TONE. Directed by Whitney White, produced by We the Women and part of the anthology film Keep This Far Apart, ROOM TONE toured the film festival circuit starring Roberta Colindrez of VIDA and Amazon Prime's A League of Their Own.

She has created several independent musical shorts including Ballerinas and Take It, which can be seen on YouTube. They also directed the music video for Hangman by musician Torii Wolf.

== Other projects ==
Young is the creator of SORORITY, a salon for new short performance works by women, trans, nonbinary and queer performing artists, which has presented hundreds of Los Angeles artists at venues including the Hammer Museum. She is also the creator of the conceptual project Feminist Acting Class, which has been presented by the Women's Center for Creative Work, and aims to undo systemic bias and teach acting from an intersectional feminist methodology. Academic Daisy Marsden says, "Young challenges the traditional, hierarchical structure of a learning environment and challenges conventional notions of gender, drawing attention to the oppressive structures in place."

== Honors and awards ==
- HUMANITAS/PLAY LA Prize
- The Jane Chambers Award for Playwriting
- Finalist, Center Theatre Group's Richard E. Sherwood Award
- Kayenta New Play Lab Residency
