= Bekah Brunstetter =

American playwright, screenwriter and television writer (born 1982)

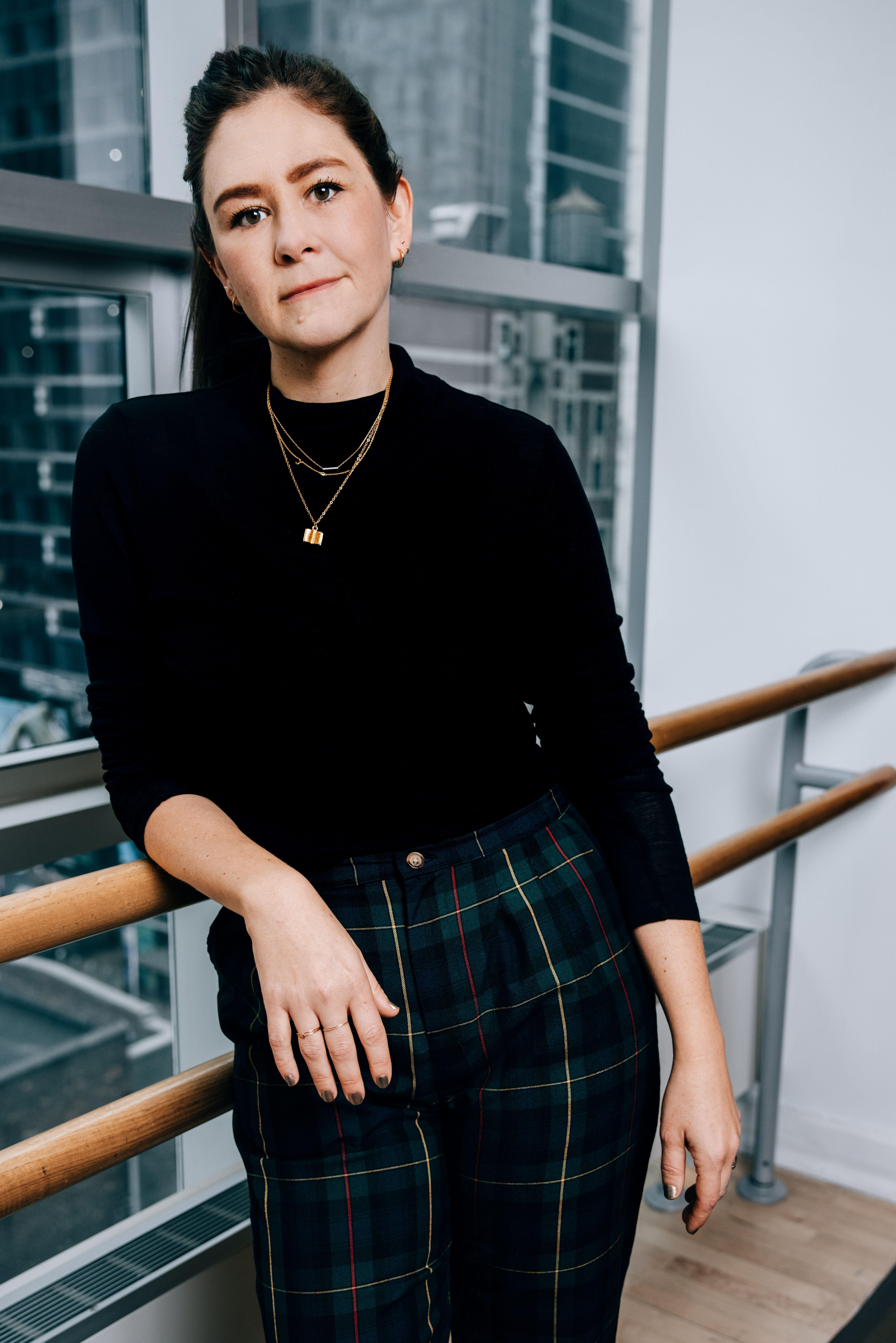
- Brunstetter in 2024
- Born: Rebecca Leah Brunstetter; June 13, 1982 (age 44); Winston-Salem, North Carolina, U.S.
- Education: University of North Carolina at Chapel Hill (BA); The New School (MFA)
- Occupations: Playwright, screenwriter, television writer, producer
- Relatives: Peter S. Brunstetter (father)
- Website: blog.bekahbrunstetter.com

Rebecca Leah "Bekah" Brunstetter (born June 13, 1982) is an American playwright, screenwriter and television writer. Her published plays include F*cking Art, which won top honors at the Samuel French Off-Off-Broadway Short Play Festival, I Used to Write on Walls, Oohrah!, Be a Good Little Widow, Going to a Place Where You Already Are, and The Cake, a play inspired by events leading to the US Supreme Court case Masterpiece Cakeshop v. Colorado Civil Rights Commission. She is a founding member of The Kilroys, which annually produces The Kilroys' List. Her television work includes writing for I Just Want My Pants Back, Underemployed, Switched at Birth, and American Gods, and both writing and producing on This Is Us.

== Early life and education ==
Rebecca Leah Brunstetter was born on June 13, 1982, in Winston-Salem, North Carolina. She is the daughter of former North Carolina Senator Peter S. Brunstetter and Jodie Brunstetter. She was raised as the only daughter among three brothers in a conservative Christian home. Brunstetter wrote poems and short stories from a young age, and became involved with theater after moving from a private Christian middle school to Mount Tabor High School, a public school.

As a student at the University of North Carolina at Chapel Hill, Brunstetter initially pursued creative writing through poetry, but feedback from her creative writing professors convinced her to try playwriting. She wrote her first play as a first-year student and decided to pursue playwriting as a career. By the time Brunstetter graduated from UNC in 2004 with a Bachelor of Fine Arts degree, the UNC Theater Department had fully staged several of her plays. She continued to study playwriting for three years in the School of Drama at The New School, graduating with a Master of Fine Arts degree.

== Career ==
=== Early plays ===
After graduating with her MFA, Brunstetter worked at a corporate job while continuing to write plays. I Used to Write on Walls, her play about three women who fall for a religious man who surfs and draws graffiti, premiered at the Gene Frankel Theatre Underground in New York in 2007, with Gwen Orel of Backstage calling it a "would-be feminist fable" that is "less convincing than cute". Duncan Pflaster of BroadwayWorld observed that the play seemed to "reinforce the stereotype that women need men to feel complete", but praised Brunstetter's writing and character development. Robert Hurwitt's review in the San Francisco Chronicle of the play's 2010 West Coast premiere also praised the quality of the dialogue, but called the lengthy play "a bit too much of one initially good thing".

In 2008, her play F*cking Art, about a cheerleader who visits her cancer-stricken classmate, was a winner at the 33rd Annual Samuel French Off-Off-Broadway Short Play Festival, and was subsequently published by Samuel French. The following year she was named Playwright in Residence at Ars Nova, and her play Oohrah!, a story about the family lives of people in a North Carolina town changing as veterans return home from Iraq, premiered off-Broadway at Stage 2 of the Atlantic Theater Company. In his review of Oohrah!, Charles Isherwood of The New York Times praised Brunstetter as an up-and-coming new playwright, but found the play "generally unconvincing". Joe Dziemianowicz of the New York Daily News assessed Oohrah! as "about as deep as your average sitcom", while drawing attention to the quality of Brunstetter's dialogue and writing of female characters.

Brunstetter's play Miss Lilly Gets Boned, a story about a religious woman whose disappointment in love causes her to plot revenge against a South African man who lost his wife in an elephant attack, premiered in 2010 at the Finborough Theatre. Writing for The Guardian, Michael Billington found the development of the main character to be unconvincing, but noted the high quality of the production and acting. In 2019, Rogue Machine Theatre produced the play's West Coast premiere in Los Angeles. Jeffrey Scott's BroadwayWorld review of the Los Angeles production praised the play, actors, and production quality, particularly the performance of Larisa Oleynik in the lead role, but also suggested that the story could be split into three one-act plays in future productions.

During her Ars Nova residency Brunstetter wrote a new play, titled Be a Good Little Widow, about the relationship between a woman and her husband's mother before and after the husband's death. Be a Good Little Widow premiered at Ars Nova in 2011, with a cast including Jill Eikenberry and Wrenn Schmidt. Writing for The New York Times, Adam Hetrick reviewed the play positively, praising Brunstetter for writing straightforward dialogue and genuinely emotional characters. A review by Chris Jones in the Chicago Tribune was less favorable to a 2011 Collaboraction staging of the play, calling Be a Good Little Widow "sincerely meant but structurally immature". Kathleen Foley later reviewed the Los Angeles premiere positively in the Los Angeles Times, observing that Brunstetter was adept at manipulating the audience's emotions to good effect.

=== Expanding into screenwriting ===
While working as a playwright, Brunstetter started a business writing audition monologues for actors and looked for other writing work to supplement her playwriting income. Her theater agent introduced her to a television agent in Los Angeles, and she was hired as a writer's assistant by MTV. After spending a season as an assistant on the short-lived MTV show I Just Want My Pants Back, she became a member of the writing staff for another MTV show, Underemployed, before moving to the ABC Family drama Switched at Birth, where she worked as a staff writer for three seasons.

Brunstetter continued her playwriting while working as a screenwriter, premiering her work Forgotten Corners of Your Dark, Dark Place, which starred actresses in wheelchairs, at the Theater Breaking Through Barriers' annual festival of new plays. Anita Gates of The New York Times praised the actresses' performances, but expressed concern that the play was unclear about whether or not it was mocking feminist self-examination groups. Brunstetter also collaborated with other Los Angeles-area writers to create The Kilroys' List, an annual list of plays by female and transgender playwrights modeled on the Black List but intended to promote gender equity. The list featured her own play The Oregon Trail, about a girl who withdraws from social life as she plays the video game The Oregon Trail. The play subsequently premiered at the Women's Voices Theater Festival, with Nelson Pressley of The Washington Post concluding that "even some over-explaining in the final steps doesn’t erase the pleasure of this quest".

=== The Cake and American Gods ===
In 2015, Brunstetter began writing The Cake, a play about a baker who is asked to bake a cake for the wedding of her best friend's daughter but refuses because it is a same-sex wedding. The play was inspired by real-life events that eventually led to the Masterpiece Cakeshop v. Colorado Civil Rights Commission Supreme Court case, and by her father's opposition to same-sex marriage, a view with which she disagrees. The play premiered in Los Angeles, with Debra Jo Rupp in the starring role. Writing for the Los Angeles Times, Philip Brandes praised the play's narrative structure but noted that some of the dialogue "reads like a laundry list of liberal activist accusations". The play has been widely produced, including shows at the La Jolla Playhouse, Houston's Alley Theatre, and an Off-Broadway premiere at the Manhattan Theatre Club at New York City Center that Jesse Green of The New York Times described as "well-baked but not quite filling".

At the same time that she was writing The Cake, Brunstetter started work on the new Starz series American Gods, based on Neil Gaiman's novel of the same name. As part of the writing team for American Gods, Brunstetter helped develop the character of the goddess Easter. She was credited as a writer on the first-season finale, titled "Come to Jesus", which Oliver Sava singled out in Vulture as an exciting standout in an otherwise poorly-paced season.

=== This Is Us ===
Brunstetter also joined the NBC series This Is Us, first as a staff writer, then story editor, before becoming a supervising producer. She was nominated along with fellow producers for the Primetime Emmy Award for Outstanding Drama Series in 2017, 2018, and 2019. Her personal childhood bullying experience inspired a "heartbreaking" scene in This Is Us in which an overweight young girl is excluded from playing with the other girls. The show debuted in 2016, and received the highest ratings among new shows on American broadcast television in its first season. Brunstetter left the show after three seasons.

=== Going to a Place Where You Already Are and later work ===
In 2016, South Coast Repertory premiered Going to a Place Where You Already Are, a play the company commissioned from Brunstetter. The play follows a terminally ill woman who comes to believe in heaven, leading her to abandon further medical treatment against the wishes of her spouse, who does not believe in an afterlife. It is based in part on conversations Brunstetter had with her father's atheist parents about death and heaven. In the Los Angeles Times, Daryl Miller called Going to a Place Where You Already Are a "terrific new play", highlighting her simultaneously emotional and entertaining treatment of serious subjects. The play was also produced by the Boulder Ensemble Theater Company, where it was panned by Juliet Wittman in Westword as a saccharine remix of elements from This Is Us, and at Theater Alliance of Washington, DC, where John Stoltenberg of DC Metro Theater Arts called it "an extraordinary exploration of love in life and loss in death".

Brunstetter was one of several writers to receive an inaugural $5,000 Writers Alliance Grant from the Dramatists Guild Foundation in 2018, with Brunstetter's grant supporting a new commission from Theater Breaking Through Barriers. The resulting play, about a woman who borrows money from her politically conservative father under false pretenses to pay for an abortion, premiered the following year at Clurman Theatre in the Theatre Row Building under the title Public Servant. In The New York Times, Laura Collins-Hughes criticized Public Servant for its character and plot development, observing that the play's story seemed "grafted to fit" its politics. While lauding the inclusive casting of Public Servant, Deb Miller of DC Metro Theater Arts expressed disapproval of Brunstetter's "signature TV style", noting particularly her handling of the play's various dilemmas with "forced, overly sentimental, and unbelievably contrived" resolutions.

=== Collaborations ===
Brunstetter was hired in 2017 to adapt the bestselling self-help book The Secret for film. Her script adapts the book's ideas about the "law of attraction" into a story about the relationship between a widowed mother and a handyman who shares his thoughts on how the universe works. In 2019, singer Ingrid Michaelson announced that she and Brunstetter had been collaborating on an adaptation of The Notebook into a Broadway musical, with author Nicholas Sparks later confirming his involvement in the production.

With screenwriter Cinco Paul providing the songs, Brunstetter wrote the script for a musical comedy titled A.D. 16, about "a teenage Mary Magdalene in love with Jesus", that premiered in February 2022 at the Olney Theatre Center in Olney, Maryland. Peter Marks of The Washington Post praised the integration of modern music and themes with the Biblical setting, as well as the design and production of the show, concluding that A.D. 16 was "an occasion that merits its own hallelujah chorus". John Stoltenberg of DC Theater Arts also praised the musical, noting the effective movement between comedy and moral seriousness, and in particular the comedic portrayal of Jesus as a counterpoint to evangelical Christian ideas about masculinity. Rebecca Ritzel of Washington City Paper criticized the connection between the story and the music, saying that "the plot stops when the music starts", but favorably noted that both Paul and Brunstetter had drawn on their personal religious backgrounds to craft a "more subtle, and more empathetic" musical than similarly irreverent works like Godspell and Jesus Christ Superstar.

== Personal life ==
Brunstetter married actor Morrison Keddie in 2016. In 2017, as a Valentine's Day present, Brunstetter wrote a short film script for Keddie based on a story about his uncle. The resulting film, titled Again, with Keddie portraying the lead role of a man who repeatedly watches the film Groundhog Day, was selected for the 2017 Tribeca Film Festival. Keddie has since provided the voice of George in the Barrington Stage Company production of The Cake. As of 2017, Brunstetter resides in Los Angeles, California.

== Works ==
- I Used to Write on Walls, Samuel French, 2008, ISBN 9780573651434
- F*cking Art, in Off Off Broadway Festival Plays, 33rd Series, Samuel French, 2008, ISBN 9780573670367
- Oohrah!, Samuel French, 2010, ISBN 9780573697951
- Be a Good Little Widow: A Funeral, Samuel French, 2011, ISBN 9780573699696
- Going to a Place Where You Already Are, Samuel French, 2016, ISBN 9780573705526
- The Cake, Samuel French, 2018, ISBN 9780573706875
