= Leah Nanako Winkler =

American dramatist

- Born: Kamakura, Kanagawa, Japan
- Other name: ウインクラーナナコ
- Education: Brooklyn College
- Occupation: Playwright
- Notable work: Kentucky, Two Mile Hollow, God Said This

Leah Nanako Winkler is a Japanese-American playwright currently living in New York City.

== Early life ==
Winkler was born in Kamakura, Kanagawa, Japan to a Japanese mother and a Caucasian American father, was a child model in Japan because of her Western looks and she modeled for a clothing magazine called Samantha. She came to the United States while still only a child and spoke primarily only Japanese. She learned English, but continued to study Japanese in a Japanese school. She grew up in Lexington, Kentucky and she credits her high school drama teacher at Tates Creek High School for introducing her to theatre. After graduating in 2007 from Butler University in Indianapolis, Winkler moved to New York to become a writer with the money she earned donating eggs to a fertility clinic. She worked many odd jobs to support herself and her theater career including working overnights at a 24-hour Starbucks. She received an MFA from Brooklyn College in 2018.

== Career ==
Once in New York, Winkler formed her own theatre company called Everywhere Theatre Group. ETG produced Leah's plays as well as collaboratively written plays including Big Girls Club (2007), Dead People (2008 with Theodore Nicholas), Formula Play (2009), A Pale Horse Death Followed With: A Life Time Original Series (2008 with Theodore Nicholas) at downtown venues including The Brick, Dixon Place and the Ontological Hysteric Theater. In 2010 ETG's play The Internet (Incubator Arts Project) garnered favorable reviews in the New York Times. In 2011 Flying Snakes in 3D!!, a science fiction parody meta-play. Leah was subsequently invited to present a manifesto regarding these issues at the Prelude Festival in 2012 alongside Richard Foreman and Mac Wellman. Shortly after ETG imploded. Leah continued to self-produce her short-form experimental work often at bars alongside poets and musicians. In 2013 Winkler published Nagoriyuki And Other Short Plays: Performed in NYC between 2008-2013. In 2014, she had two plays Death for Sydney Black and Diversity Awareness Picnic on The Kilroys' List, a gender parity initiative highlighting underproduced works by female playwrights. In August 2014, Leah's play Taisetsu Na Hito was selected from an initial pool of 1,385 submissions to be performed at Sam French's Offf Off Broadway Festival Plays, 39th series It was published later that year.

In 2015, Winkler published another book of plays, The Lowest Form of Writing Her play Double Suicide At Ueno Park was produced by Ensemble Studio Theater. Her blog post about a yellowface production of The Mikado started a protest and led to further controversy.

In 2016, Winkler's play Kentucky was on the Kilroys list and had its world premiere at the Ensemble Studio Theatre as a co-production with the Radio Drama Network and Page 73 Productions in New York. The play garnered favorable reviews and the Times called her a "Distinctive New Voice"

The West Coast premiere was at East West Players in Los Angeles in the fall.

In spring 2017, she was selected by the Sundance institute as a Sundance/Ucross Fellow. Winkler was then named the 2017–2019 Jerome New York Fellow at the Lark. after being awarded the first-ever Mark O'Donnell Prize from the Actors Fund and Playwrights Horizons. She also became one of Audible's first ever recipients of the Emerging Playwrights Fund to write an audio play. Leah's play Two Mile Hollow had a rolling premiere at four theaters across the U.S., The First Floor Theater (Chicago), Mixed Blood Theatre/Theater Mu (Minneapolis), Ferocious Lotus (San Francisco), and Artists at Play (Los Angeles) to critical acclaim. In 2018, her play God Said This was selected for the 42nd Humana Festival of New American Plays, in Louisville, Kentucky in February–April 2018. In March, 2018, God Said This was selected by Pulitzer Prize winning Ayad Akhtar from over 1600 plays from 50 countries to win the Yale Drama Series Prize. It premiered Off-Broadway in 2019 at Primary Stages. Also in 2019 she premiered her play Hot Asian Doctor Husband at Theater Mu and Mixed Blood and an audio play, Nevada-Tan exclusively on Audible.

Winkler is an alumna of the Youngblood group at the Ensemble Studio Theatre, Dorothy Strelsin New American Playwrights Group at Primary Stages, WP Lab and a current member of Ma-Yi Writers Lab.

== Selected plays ==
- Death for Sydney Black (2014, terraNova Collective, 2015 Kilroys Honorable Mention)
- Diversity Awareness Picnic (2014, Kilroys Honorable Mention)
- Double Suicide At Ueno Park (2015, Ensemble Studio Theatre, 35th Marathon of One-Act Plays)
- The Adventures of Minami: The Robot From Japan Who Makes You Feel Safe When Loneliness is Palpable (2016, Brick)
- Kentucky (2016, Ensemble Studio Theatre and Page 73; East West Players)
- Two Mile Hollow (2017-2018, Artists At Play (Los Angeles); Mixed Blood Theatre/Theater Mu (Minneapolis); First Floor Theater (Chicago); Ferocious Lotus (San Francisco), 2017 Kilroys' List)
- Linus and Murray (2017, Ensemble Studio Theatre, 36th Marathon of One-Act Plays)
- God Said This (2018, 42nd Humana Festival of New American Plays)
- Hot Asian Doctor Husband (2019, Mu Performing Arts/ Mixed Blood Theater)
- Nevada-Tan (2019, Audible)
- Brightest Thing in the World (2022, Yale Rep)
- Thirty-Six (2025, Shotgun Players)

== Awards ==
- 2015 Samuel French OOB Short Play Festival
- 2015 Truman Capote Fellowship in Creative Writing
- 2017–2019 Jerome New York Fellowship recipient
- 2017 Mark O'Donnell Prize
- 2018 Yale Drama Series Prize
- 2019 Francesca Primus Prize
- 2020 Peabody Award
- 2020 Steinberg Prize
- 2025 Will Glickman Award
- 2025 Daryl Roth Creative Spirit Award
