= Round House Theatre =

Theater company in Bethesda, Maryland, U.S.

Coordinates: 38°59′6.2″N 77°5′33″W

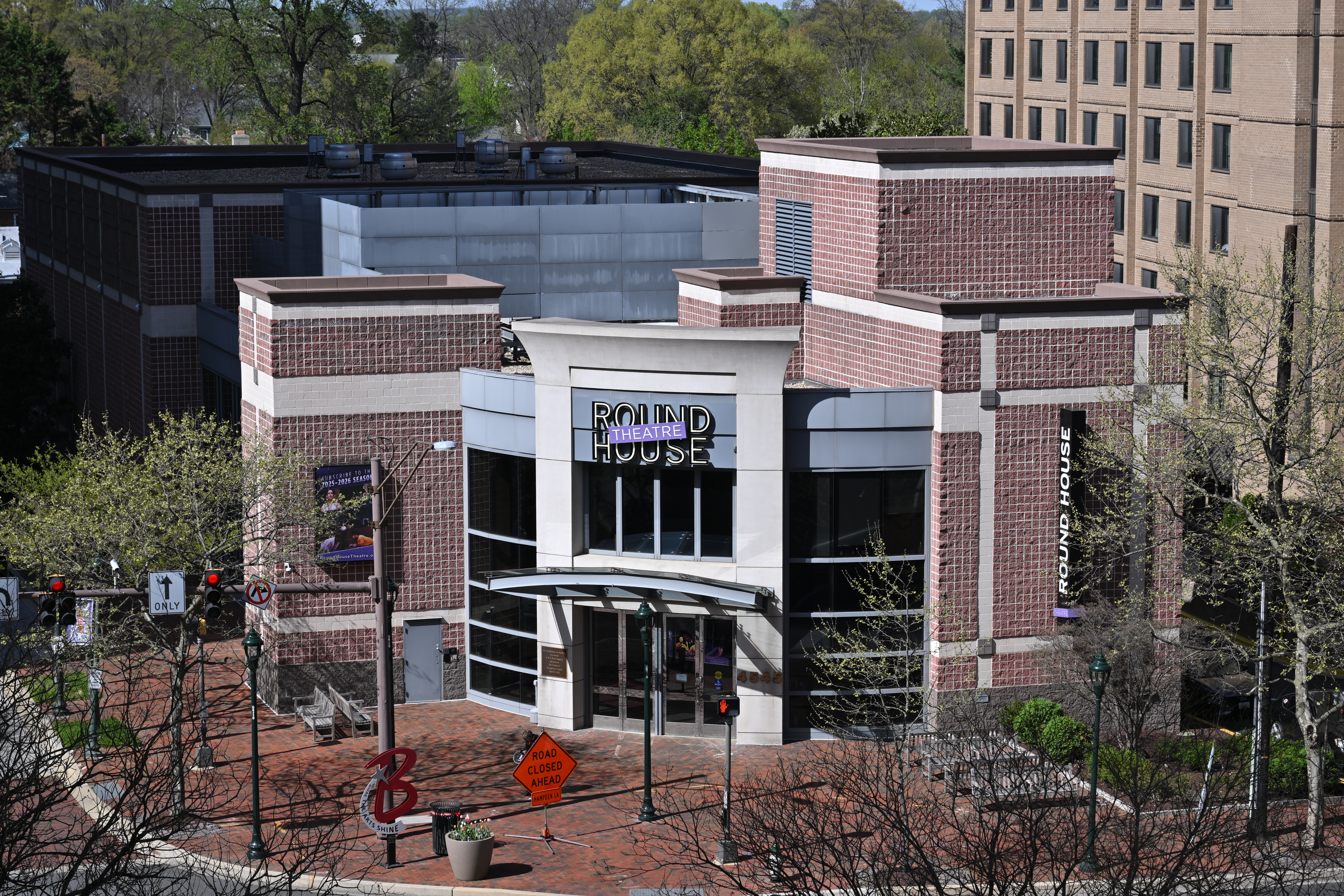
- Theatre building on East-West Hwy
- Formation: 1978; 48 years ago
- Type: Theatre group
- Location: 4545 East-West Highway, Bethesda, MD
- Artistic director: Ryan Rilette
- Notable members: Ed Zakreski, Managing Director
- Website: www.roundhousetheatre.org

Round House Theatre is an American professional theater company located in Bethesda, Maryland. Founded in 1978, it operates as a 501(c)(3) nonprofit organization. The theater produces contemporary plays and classic works, with a focus on American playwrights.

== History ==
Round House began in 1970 as “Street ’70”, a program by the Montgomery County Department of Recreation that provided educational outreach in the schools and performances throughout the county. In 1977, the company moved to the Round House Theatre, located in the former Bushey Drive Elementary School in Silver Spring, MD. In 2002 the theater moved to a brand new facility in downtown Bethesda, which was a significant upgrade.

In 1982, the company was incorporated as a nonprofit under the name "Round House". The company remained a part of the County’s Department of Recreation until 1993, when it became a separate and independent professional theater group.

== About ==
Round House presents a combination of modern classics, new plays, and musicals for approximately 55,000 guests each year. Round House has been nominated for 231 Helen Hayes Awards and has won 52. Round House has also been honored for four consecutive years with the 50/50 Applause Award from the International Center for Women Playwrights.

Round House’s educational programs serve more than 3,000 students at its Education Center in Silver Spring and other schools in Montgomery County. These programs include theatre classes for adults and youth, summer programs for grades K–12, and a teen performance company run by high school students. Round House also organizes Free Play, a program that allows teenagers and college students to attend theatre shows for free.

Round House is a member of the League of Resident Theatres (LORT) and the League of Washington Theatres (LOWT). The theatre is a 501(c)3 not-for-profit organization, with major support from Montgomery County, the Maryland State Arts Council, and the Arts and Humanities Council of Montgomery County.

== Productions ==
=== 2025-26 season ===
- The Inheritance, Parts One and Two by Matthew López
- Rules for Living by Sam Holcroft
- Nothing Up My Sleeve by Aaron Posner and Dendy
- Sally & Tom by Suzan-Lori Parks

=== 2024-25 season ===
- Sojourners by Mfoniso Udofia
- A Hannukah Carol, or GELT TRIP! The Musical by Aaron Kenny, Rob Berliner, and Harrison Bryan
- What the Constitution Means to Me by Heidi Schreck
- Bad Books by Sharon Rothstein
- King James by Rajiv Joseph

=== 2018-19 season ===
- Small Mouth Sounds by Bess Wohl
- How I Learned to Drive by Paula Vogel
- Gem of the Ocean by August Wilson
- Oslo by J.T. Rogers
- A Doll's House, Part 2 by Lucas Hnath

=== 2017-2018 season ===
- In The Heights by Lin-Manuel Miranda and Quiara Alegría Hudes, Co-Production with Olney Theatre Center
- I'll Get You Back Again by Sarah Gancher
- The Book of Will by Lauren Gunderson
- Handbagged by Moira Buffini, part of the Women's Voices Theater Festival
- "Master Harold" ...and the Boys by Athol Fugard
- The Legend of Georgia McBride by Matthew López

=== 2016-2017 season ===
- Angels in America Part I: Millennium Approaches by Tony Kushner, Co-Production with Olney Theatre Center
- Angels in America Part II: Perestroika by Tony Kushner, Co-Production with Olney Theatre Center
- Miss Bennet: Christmas at Pemberley by Lauren Gunderson and Margot Melcon
- Caroline, or Change by Tony Kushner and Jeanine Tesori
- Or, by Liz Duffy Adams
- How I Learned What I Learned by August Wilson, co-conceived by Todd Kreidler

=== 2015-2016 season ===
- Ironbound by Martyna Majok, part of the Women's Voices Theater Festival
- The Night Alive by Conor McPherson
- Stage Kiss by Sarah Ruhl
- Father Comes Home from the Wars (Parts 1, 2 & 3) by Suzan-Lori Parks
- Cat on a Hot Tin Roof by Tennessee Williams
- The Who & The What by Ayad Akhtar

=== 2014-2015 season ===
- Fool for Love by Sam Shepard
- Fetch Clay, Make Man by Will Power
- The Nutcracker by Tommy Rapley, Jake Minton, Phillip Klapperich, and Kevin O’Donnell
- Rapture, Blister, Burn by Gina Gionfriddo
- Uncle Vanya by Anton Chekhov, new version by Annie Baker
- NSFW by Lucy Kirkwood

== See also ==
- Helen Hayes Award
