= Ensemble Studio Theatre =

Off-Broadway theatre in New York City, US

Coordinates: 40°46′1.03″N 73°59′34.77″W

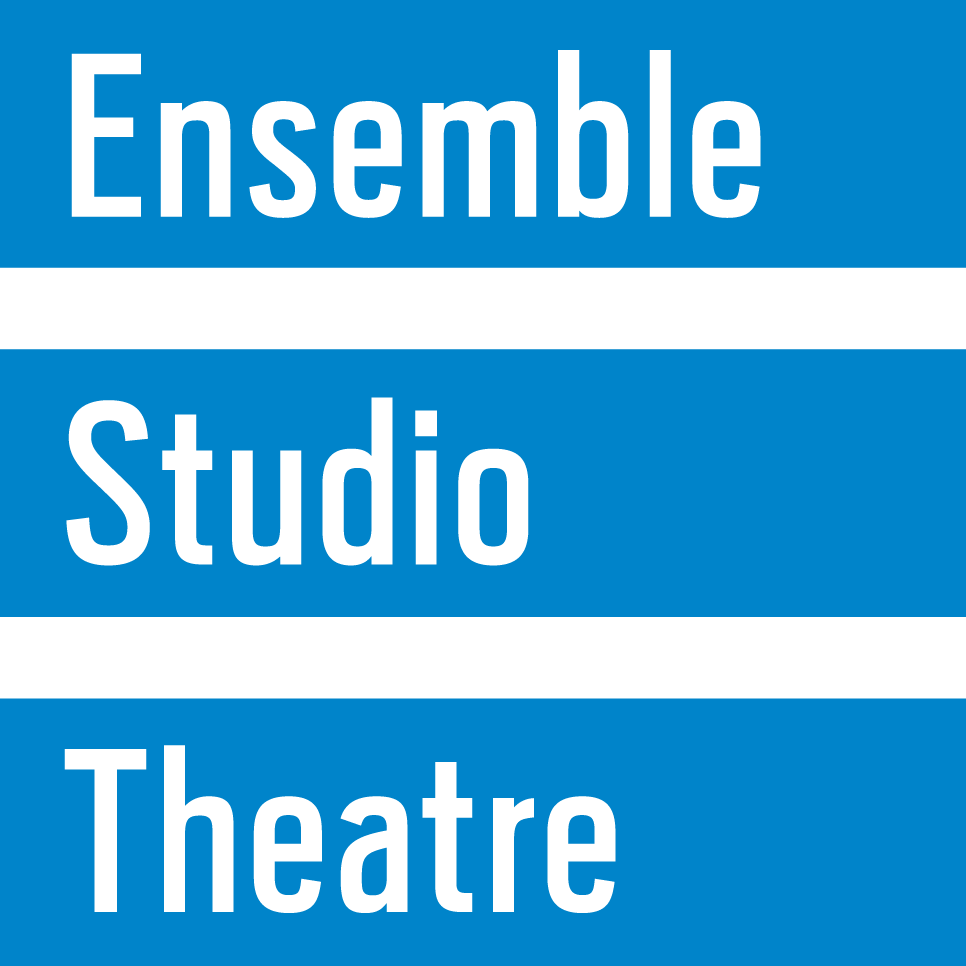
Ensemble Studio Theatre's new logo after 2014 rebrand

The Ensemble Studio Theatre (EST) is a nonprofit membership-based developmental theatre located in Hell's Kitchen, New York City. It has a dual mission of nurturing individual theatre artists and developing new American plays.

== Overview ==
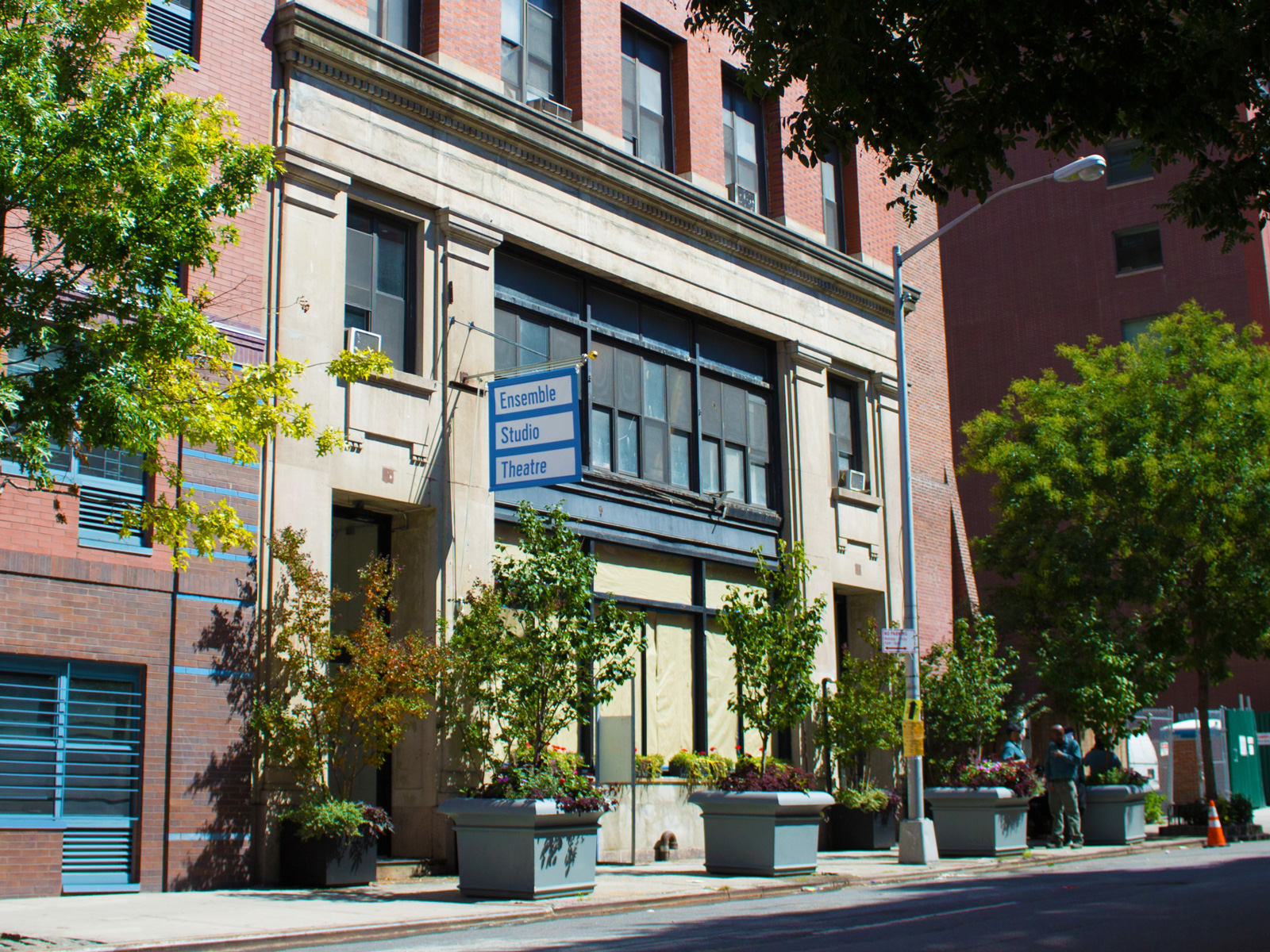
Ensemble Studio theatre at 545 West 52nd Street in Hell's Kitchen

The Ensemble Studio Theatre—commonly known as "EST"—was founded in 1968 by Curt Dempster. With 589 ensemble artists concentrated mainly in New York City, EST has been under the artistic direction of William Carden since 2007.

EST hosts three groups of playwrights: Youngblood, EST's OBIE-winning collective of emerging professional playwrights under the age of 30; the EST Playwrights Unit, a diverse group of playwrights that comprises both EST members and non-members; and Going to the River, a group of women playwrights of color with distinct and powerful voices. EST also cultivates the development of plays during a three-week annual tenure as the resident theater company of the Southampton Writers Conference, in partnership with the SUNY Stony Brook's MFA summer playwriting program.

EST has presented its new, short play festival, the Marathon of One-Act Plays, annually for over thirty years, and it is a public forum for new works by both well-established and up-and-coming writers. The Marathon has been credited for reviving the one-act play form, inspiring many similar festivals across the country. Past playwrights include Horton Foote, Tina Howe, David Mamet, Shirley Lauro, Jaquelyn Reingold, and José Rivera.

Since 1968, EST has produced over 6,000 new works. It produces approximately 150 projects each year, ranging from fully produced mainstage productions to a variety of in-progress workshops and readings.

== Membership ==
EST has a membership of over 600 theatre artists, including playwrights, directors, actors, designers and managers.

== Notable EST member artists ==
- David Auburn
- Annie Baker
- Bob Balaban
- Lewis Black
- Geneva Carr
- Catherine Curtin
- Dane DeHaan
- Danny DeVito
- Lucy DeVito
- Christopher Durang
- John Guare
- William Jackson Harper
- Lucas Hnath
- Tina Howe
- William H. Macy
- David Mamet
- Gates McFadden
- Qui Nguyen
- Sarah Jessica Parker
- Austin Pendleton
- José Rivera
- John Patrick Shanley
- Grant Shaud
- Shel Silverstein
- Lois Smith
- Jon Voight
- Wendy Wasserstein
- Claudia Weill
- Ming Na Wen
- Leah Nanako Winkler
- Jerry Zaks
- Anna Ziegler
- Nitya Vidyasagar

== EST Youngblood ==
Youngblood is Ensemble Studio Theatre's collective of emerging professional playwrights under the age of 30. Founded in 1993.

Plays by current and former Youngblood playwrights have been performed at The Royal Court Theatre, Lincoln Center, Playwrights Horizons, Second Stage, Actors Theatre of Louisville, the Mark Taper Forum, the Vineyard Theater, the Atlantic Theater Company and Rattlestick Playwrights Theater, including award winners such as Annie Baker's The Aliens and Amy Herzog's 4000 Miles, and have been adapted by film and television companies, including alumni Lucy Alibar's Juicy and Delicious which was adapted into the film Beasts of The Southern Wild.

Youngblood is currently run by Co-Artistic Directors Graeme Gillis and RJ Tolan.

== Notable Youngblood alumni ==
- Robert Askins
- Annie Baker
- Amy Herzog
- Mike Lew
- Qui Nguyen
- Christopher Shinn
- Lucy Thurber
- Leah Nanako Winkler
