= Women's Voices Theater Festival (Washington D.C.) =

Theater festival in Washington, D.C., United States

- Festival Logo
- Location: Washington D.C. Metropolitan Area United States
- Founded: 2015
- Founded by: Seven Theatre Production Companies in Washington D.C. Metropolitan Area
- Type of play: Premiers of Plays by Women Playwrights
- Festival date: August – November 2015
- Website: www.womensvoicestheaterfestival.org

In the fall of 2015, the Washington, D.C. region's professional theaters combined to produce the Women's Voices Theater Festival. The festival consisted of over 50 companies each presenting a world premiere production of a work by one or more female playwrights. The festival claimed to be "the largest collaboration of theater companies working simultaneously to produce original works by female writers in history". The Coordinating Producers of the Women's Voices Theater Festival were Nan Barnett of the National New Play Network (NNPN) and former NNPN General Manager Jojo Ruf. The honorary committee supporting the festival was chaired by first lady Michelle Obama and included actors Allison Janney and Tea Leoni and playwrights Beth Henley, Quiara Alegría Hudes and Lynn Nottage.

== Originating theatre companies ==
- Arena Stage: Artistic Director Molly Smith
- Ford's Theatre: Director Paul R. Tetreault
- Round House Theatre: Producing Artistic Director Ryan Rilette
- Shakespeare Theatre Company: Artistic Director Michael Kahn
- Signature Theatre: Artistic Director Eric Schaeffer
- Studio Theatre: Artistic Director David Muse
- Woolly Mammoth Theatre Company: Artistic Director Howard Shalwitz

== Plays ==
Author	Title	Producing Company	Dates	Description	News & Reviews
Kathleen Akerley	Bones In Whispers	Longacre Lea	August 12 – September 6	2016 A.D. 99% of the human population is gone, wiped out in a mysterious Death Week. The remaining 1% cling to their theories of survival. Two clans collide in an abandoned hospital that may itself be some mutant survivor of the plague, and use guns and hip-hop dancing to fend off death, ghosts, and the disease of being human.
Kathleen Akerley	Night Falls on the Blue Planet	Theater Alliance	September 3 – September 27	Renee has had a rough couple of years. Screw that: Renee has had a rough life, shaped by alcoholism and estrangement. All that changes when she gets a massage and discovers that her body is a world unto itself. With help from her younger sister she starts to map and explore a lifetime of trauma: but is she healing, or is she vanishing into her own world? Will her exploration heal her relationship with her older sister, or widen their divide?
Claudia Barnett	Witches Vanish	Venus Theatre Company	August 20 – September 20	In a series of stylized, highly visual vignettes employing puppetry, poetry, and surrealism, the weird sisters from Macbeth explore the stories of women who disappear, whether by choice or force. Inspired by history, astronomy, and Shakespeare, Witches Vanish examines the nature of change and the value of human life.
Bekah Brunstetter	The Oregon Trail	Flying V Theatre	September 3 – September 20	A tale of two young women, both named Jane. One is an awkward middle scholer with burgeoning body odor, a crush on a jerk who likes her sister, and an epic aptitude at The Oregon Trail. The other is actually in the game, living through the hardships of trail life with her family, totally unaware of her capricious fate as a character in a classic video game. But this game has an agenda of its own, maneuvering both Janes on a painful path towards self recognition.
Sheila Callaghan	Women Laughing Alone With Salad	Woolly Mammoth Theatre Company	September 7 – October 4	What's on the menu for Meredith, Tori, and Sandy: the three women in Guy's life? Healthy lifestyles, upward mobility, meaningful sex? Or self-loathing and distorted priorities? This world premiere is served up on a bed of bawdy language in a gender-bending comedy vinaigrette, inviting everyone—men and women, mothers and sons—to savor this complex recipe of desire and shame.
Marcia E. Cole	A Matter of Worth	September 16 – September 24	Live Garra Theatre	A vo-collage play seen from the eyes of Hannah, a 73-year-old slave; her sharp mother-wit proves she's worth much more than what's being sold on auction day. The action takes place in Baltimore County in the summer of 1855. It is the day of the estate inventory for a deceased plantation owner held in the courtyard. It is midday on the estate of Caleb D. Goodwin.
Karin Coonrod	texts&beheadings/ElizabethR	Folger Theatre, in association with Compagnia de' Colombari	September 19 – October 4	Exploring the life and language of England's greatest queen. Drawing in part from the Folger collection of Elizabeth's letters, the play uses her own words to reveal Elizabeth's wit, courage, and extraordinary love of her people. Four actresses portray the resilient queen, through poems, prayers and private letters.
Jennie Berman Eng	Whenever You're Near Me I Feel Sick	Thelma Theatre	September 17 – October 4	Twenty-somethings Wendy and Andre are in love with each other, but to admit that would mean taking chances, making a commitment and being adults. And so when Andre tells Wendy he does love her, has always loved her, she makes jokes, and he moves away and moves on. Except that neither ever really moves on, and neither really grows up. Apart from each other, Wendy and Andre stagnate professionally, and stumble through marriages to other people. When they run into each other eight years later, with children in tow, they are forced to confront what they have always felt. Can they finally be grown-ups?
Gabrielle Fulton	Uprising	MetroStage	September 17 – October 25	The play is set in the aftermath of John Brown's Raid on Harper's Ferry. When Sal discovers Ossie, a hypnotic revolutionary hiding in the field, her life is turned upside down by her strong attraction to him and his revolutionary mission and its impact on her commitment to the well-being of her young son, Freddie. Inspired by the true story of Osborne Perry Anderson, the only African American participant in John Brown's Raid to survive, and the tales of the playwright's cotton-picking great-grandmother.
Miranda Rose Hall	How We Died of Disease-Related Illness	Longacre Lea	August 12 – September 6	An absurdist comedy about the epidemic of American paranoia amidst the threat of epidemic disease. The play takes place in an American isolation ward after a U.S. citizen returns with an unnamed illness from an unnamed foreign country. An all-too-real present day crisis gets imaginatively upended on a seriocomic playground.
Patricia Henley	If I Hold My Tongue	Compass Rose Theater	September 17 – September 27	Set in Fells Point, Baltimore, it explores the lives of four women in prostitution living in a halfway house. An empathetic portrait of their struggles to leave street life, If I Hold My Tongue is a realistic look at emotionally and physically scarred women who wish to return to a normal life, a job, a family, and safety.
Caleen Sinnette Jennings	Queens Girl in the World	Theater J	September 16 – October 11	It's summer 1962 on Erickson Street, Queens, New York. The sounds of doo-wop music fill the night, the scent of cream soda lingers in the air and 12-year-old Jacqueline Marie Butler is on the verge of adulthood. At the end of that summer, Jacqueline's parents abruptly transfer her to a progressive, predominantly Jewish school in Greenwich Village. As one of only four black students, Jacqueline discovers a new city and a whole new world.
Martyna Majok	Ironbound	Round House Theatre	September 9 – October 4	In a world where even the ugly jobs are gone, hard-working Polish immigrant Darja is done dating cheaters and dreamers. It's time to look out for herself and the only thing that matters more – her son. Over the course of three relationships spanning 22 years, Darja must decide how hard she's willing to fight for what she loves most.
Jaci Pulice	The October Issue	Washington Improv Theater	September 17 – October 10	An improvised show inspired by the traditional format of a women's magazine. In each one-of-a-kind performance, the cast delivers an unvarnished look at life from a woman's perspective by way of articles, interviews, quizzes, photoshoots, horoscopes, advice columns, and a lot of unnecessary tips.
Esphyr Slobodkina (based on her book) Ann Marie Mulhearn Sayer (Co-Playwright)	Caps For Sale, The Musical	Adventure Theatre MTC	September 11 – September 27	"Caps! Caps for sale! Fifty cents a cap!" The cap peddler, Pezzo, wears a huge stack of caps, balanced carefully on top of his head. Brown caps, blue caps, gray caps, and red caps. When no one buys a cap, he takes a nap under a shady tree. But, when he wakes up, the caps are gone! Where could his caps have disappeared to? Was it bears, pirates, one thousand thieves or a band of merry mischievous monkeys? How will he ever get them back?
Karen Zacarias	Destiny of Desire	Arena Stage	September 11 – October 18	On a stormy night in Bellarica, Mexico, two baby girls are born — one into a life of privilege and one into a life of poverty. But when the newborns are swapped by a former beauty queen with an insatiable lust for power, the stage is set for two outrageous misfortunes to grow into one remarkable destiny.

== Post-festival ==
Caps For Sale The Musical, in conjunction with the 75th anniversary of the publication of the book, had a national tour ending with an Off-Broadway run at the New Victory Theater from February 27 to March 6, 2016.
