= Theater Breaking Through Barriers =

Theater company in New York City, U.S.

- Formation: 1979
- Founder: Ike Schambelan
- Type: Theatre group
- Location: New York City
- Artistic director: Nicholas Viselli
- Website: www.tbtb.org

Theater Breaking Through Barriers (TBTB), formerly Theater By the Blind, is an inclusive theater company in New York City that strives develop the talents of individuals with disabilities for work onstage, backstage, in the office and in the audience. It was founded in 1979 by Ike Schambelan(who died of cancer in 2015), with sighted actors recording plays for the blind. The theater then moved to performances for the blind and then blind performances for the sighted. They recently began doing a short play festival each year.

== Crystal Clear ==
Crystal Clear by Phil Young opened in 1986 at the Long Wharf Theater's Stage II. The show starred (George Ashiotis) who played a young actor who is gradually going blind from diabetes and his girlfriend who has been blind from birth (Lucia Puccia) . Crystal Clear began as an improvisation on a London pub stage in 1982.

The production had mixed reviews from critics. Mel Gusso said for The New York Times, "It is diagnostic rather than psychologically probing." Another critic said the play was "a wildly unfocused work that tries to cover too vast a terrain" and that it contained "a cornucopia of cliches".

== A Midsummer Night's Dream ==
A Midsummer Night's Dream by William Shakespeare staged at the Barrow Group Theater in Manhattan, was the first play by TBTB to feature a character in a wheelchair:

It holds Ann Marie Morelli, an actress playing Hermia, who at first has the attention of one too many men but later finds herself with the attention of one too few. Hermia, as created by Shakespeare, is short, and her rival in love, Helena (Erin O’Leary), is tall. Through the centuries poor Hermia has always taken a verbal beating for her physique, but here it has a different bite. "Get you gone, you dwarf, you minimus," barks Lysander, who once doted on her. And Hermia herself laments, "My legs can keep no pace with my desires."

— Neil Genzlinger, New York Times

A note in the theater program said, "Increasingly we feel we must include all disabled people [rather than blind people only] in our work." To reflect this shift in thought and philosophy, 2008 saw the company changing its name from Theater By The Blind to Theater Breaking Through Barriers. Productions, such as Romeo & Juliet, closely followed featuring an actor, Gregg Mozgala, with Cerebral Palsy, their first in a subsequent line of productions incorporating actors with various disabilities. In 2020 as a result of the pandemic they presented playwriting intensives and performances via Zoom with captions and audio descriptions.
