= Cost of Living (play) =

Play by Martyna Majok

- Written by: Martyna Majok
- Subject: Relationships between disabled and non-disabled persons
- Genre: Drama

Premiere
- Date premiered: June 29, 2016
- Place premiered: Williamstown Theatre Festival

Cost of Living is a dramatic stage play written by Polish-born American playwright Martyna Majok. It premiered in Williamstown, Massachusetts, at the Williamstown Theatre Festival on June 29, 2016, and had an Off-Broadway engagement in 2017. The play won the 2018 Pulitzer Prize for Drama as well as two Lucille Lortel Awards, including Outstanding Play.

== Synopsis ==
The play examines two pairs of relationships between disabled and able persons: one between John, a graduate student with cerebral palsy and his female caregiver, Jess, and the other between Ani, who became a quadriplegic following a tragic accident and her ex-husband, Eddie, an unemployed truck driver.

== Notable casts ==
Gregg Mozgala and Katy Sullivan, the actors who originated the disabled characters, have those disabilities in real life.

Role	Williamstown Theatre Festival 2016	New York City Center 2017	Broadway 2022
Jess	Rebecca Naomi Jones	Jolly Abraham	Kara Young
John	Gregg Mozgala	Gregg Mozgala	Gregg Mozgala
Eddie	Wendell Pierce	Victor Williams	David Zayas
Ani	Katy Sullivan	Katy Sullivan	Katy Sullivan

== Production history ==
Cost of Living was expanded from the 2015 two-character one-act Majok play John, Who's Here From Cambridge by adding a second couple. John, Who's Here From Cambridge ran Off-Broadway from May 28 – June 20, 2015. Cost of Living made its world premiere during a June 29 – July 10, 2016, run at the Williamstown Theatre Festival. It then moved to New York City Center for a production by Manhattan Theatre Club that had previews beginning on May 16, 2017, and officially opened on June 7, 2017. Williamstown Theatre Festival co-produced the Off-Broadway debut with the Manhattan Theatre Club. In 2018, Williamstown Theatre Festival announced that they had commissioned a musical adaptation from Michael John LaChiusa. The play made its Broadway debut in the fall of 2022 at Manhattan Theatre Club's Samuel J. Friedman Theatre.

Theatre	Opening Date	Closing Date	Details
Williamstown Theatre Festival, Williamstown	June 29, 2016	July 10, 2016	Premiere production
New York City Center, Off-Broadway	June 7, 2017	July 16, 2017	Off-Broadway debut
Samuel J. Friedman Theatre, Broadway	October 3, 2022	November 6, 2022	Broadway debut

== Awards and nominations ==
Cost of Living earned three Lucille Lortel Awards nominations on April 4, 2018. It eventually won in two of the three categories, tying with School Girls; Or, the African Mean Girls Play for Outstanding Play and earning Outstanding Featured Actor in a Play for Gregg Mozgala. On April 16, the play earned Majok, a University of Chicago and Yale School of Drama graduate, the Pulitzer Prize for Drama for her work that explores "diverse perceptions of privilege and human connection through two pairs of mismatched individuals". The play received 4 Outer Critics Circle Awards nominations. It also received both a Drama Desk Award and a Drama League Award nomination. Although, Cost of Living received no Off Broadway Alliance Awards in 2018, Director Jo Bonney earned one of the Legend of Off Broadway Awards from the organization in 2018.

=== 2018 Off-Broadway premiere ===
Year	Award	Category	Nominee	Result	Ref.
2018	Lucille Lortel Awards	Outstanding Play	Martyna Majok, Williamstown Theatre Festival, Manhattan Theatre Club	Won	
2018	Lucille Lortel Awards	Outstanding Featured Actor in a Play	Gregg Mozgala	Won	
2018	Lucille Lortel Awards	Outstanding Featured Actress in a Play	Katy Sullivan	Nominated	
2018	Pulitzer Prize	Drama	Martyna Majok	Won	
2018	Drama League Awards	Distinguished Performance	Katy Sullivan	Nominated	
2018	Outer Critics Circle Awards	Outstanding New Off-Broadway Play		Nominated	
2018	Outer Critics Circle Awards	Outstanding Actor in a Play	Gregg Mozgala	Nominated	
2018	Outer Critics Circle Awards	Outstanding Actress in a Play	Katy Sullivan	Nominated	
2018	Outer Critics Circle Awards	Outstanding Director of a Play	Jo Bonney	Nominated	
2018	Drama Desk Awards	Outstanding Featured Actor in a Play	Gregg Mozgala	Nominated	

=== 2023 Broadway production ===
Year	Award	Category	Nominee	Result	Ref.
2023	Tony Awards	Best Play		Nominated	
2023	Tony Awards	Best Direction of a Play	Jo Bonney	Nominated	
2023	Tony Awards	Best Featured Actor in a Play	David Zayas	Nominated	
2023	Tony Awards	Best Featured Actress in a Play	Katy Sullivan	Nominated	
2023	Tony Awards	Best Featured Actress in a Play	Kara Young	Nominated	
