= Matt Frey =

- Born: Matthew Deleer Deal Frey; July 25, 1986 (age 39)
- Origin: United States
- Genres: Indie, Alternative rock
- Occupation: Musician
- Instruments: keyboards, guitar

Matt Frey is a musician from Huntington Beach, California. He was born in Anaheim, California. He is currently the touring keyboardist for the Nickelodeon act Big Time Rush. He was a member in the short-lived LA quartet, Polus as well as Las Vegas group, Parade of Lights. He has performed with Thirty Seconds to Mars in various European cities and at the My Coke Fest in South Africa. Most recently he completed the Better with U Tour as a member of the Big Time Rush Backing Band.

== Selected discography ==
with Polus
Wish EP

with Parade of Lights
Parade of Lights EP "Just Like Falling In Love"

== Select videography ==
Parade of Lights: "Just a Little"
Polus: "The Edge"
