= Women's Center for Creative Work =

Network of women based in Los Angeles who promote art and feminism

- Formation: 2013
- Location: Los Angeles, California
- Directors: Sarah E. Williams and Kate Johnston
- Website: womenscenterforcreativework.com

The Women's Center for Creative Work, or WCCW, is a network of women based in Los Angeles who promote art and feminism. Founded in 2013, the WCCW operates through various exhibitions, workshops, dinners, and other special events that connect creative women and feminists. The WCCW was founded in 2013 by Katie Bachler, Kate Johnston, and Sarah E. Williams. In 2015, the WCCW received a grant for Los Angeles–based Social Practice Art projects from SPArt.

"Combining a co-workspace on the LA river in Frogtown, project incubation facilities, residency programs, a rapidly growing network of over 16,000 followers, and a full calendar of artistic and professional development programming, WCCW advocates for feminist-led creative projects and practices in Los Angeles."

In 2018, the WCCW launched the Stock Photo Project, a stock photo database featuring people of color, women, genderqueer, and disabled folks of all ages and body types, in a variety of settings and narratives. In 2019, the WCCW was part of the Frieze fair.

== Events ==
- Art and Feminism Wikipedia Edit-a-Thon. Wikipedia meetup. March 2015.
- The Egg & The Eye Pop-up. Afternoon pop-up restaurant with the Craft and Folk Art Museum. December 2014.
- Women Who Run With Wolves. Doll-making workshop with Necessary Habits. August 2014.
- A Women's Dinner of Exchanges. Dinner based around ideas of exchange and economies. October 2014.
