= Chisa Hutchinson =

American playwright (born 1980)

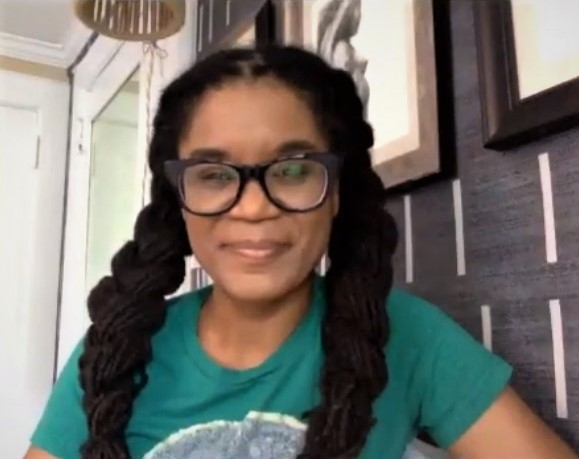
- Hutchinson on HowlRound in 2020
- Born: 1980 (age 45–46); Queens, New York, US
- Education: AB Vassar College; MFA New York University
- Occupations: Playwright, Performer
- Writing career
- Notable awards: GLAAD Award (2010), Lilly Award (2010), Lanford Wilson Award (2015)

Chisa Hutchinson is an American playwright.

== Career ==
Hutchinson was a Lark Fellow as well as a Dramatist Guild Fellow. She has been a Humanitas Fellow and the Tow Foundation Fellow at Second Stage.

Hutchinson has been a cast member of the Neo-Futurists in New York, a staff writer for the Blue Man Group, and a member of New Dramatists. She was among the first wave of commissions for Audible's Emerging Playwright program, and her Proof of Love was the first full production from the program.

Hutchinson was a writer on the 2024 Starz television series Three Women. Currently, Hutchinson teaches creative writing at the University of Delaware.

== Early life ==
Chisa Hutchinson was born in Queens, New York in 1980. At the age of four she was unofficially adopted by a family in Newark, New Jersey. At the age of 14 Hutchinson relocated to the Short Hills section of Millburn, New Jersey to attend Kent Place School. It is here that she was exposed to theatre for the first time. While attending high school, her drama teacher took her to attend a debate between August Wilson and Robert Brustein which inspired her to write African American centric theatre.

== Education ==
Hutchinson attended Vassar College where she received an A.B. in Dramatic Arts. She would later go to earn her M.F.A. in Dramatic Writing from Tisch School of the Arts.

At Vassar College, Hutchinson was the only Black drama major. Because her education was not exploring theatre by Black writers, Hutchinson felt compelled to create her own work.

== Themes ==
Hutchinson's work centers around responding to social issues, although she states that, "the best way to write a play about a social issue is to not make it about a social issue." Her plays tell stories of people that are rarely seen on stage, such as transgender stories or stories of people of color.

In interview she stated

I’m not a politician. I’m not a lawyer, an economist. I don’t know how to fix big stuff. I feel like someone handed me a shoelace and said, “Okay, build a rocket ship.” Words, that’s what I got, words. It’s what I have. But if change doesn’t happen it won’t be for my lack of trying, even if all I have to offer is words. I’m going to try every which way to wield those words to see what they can produce, what ripples they can make.

== Plays ==
- Amerikin (59E59)
- Surely Goodness and Mercy (New Jersey Performing Arts Center)
- She Likes Girls (Lark Play Development Center, Working Man's Clothes)
- Proof of Love (Minetta Lane Theater)
- Mama's Gonna Buy You (Inge Center for the Arts)
- This is not the Play (Mad Dog Theatre Company, Cleveland Public Theater)
- Sex on Sunday (Lark Play Development Center, the BE Company)
- Tunde's Trumpet (Summer Stage, BOOM Arts)
- The Subject (Atlantic Theatre Company, Playwrights' Foundation, Victory Gardens Theater, Partial Comfort, and Rattlestick Playwrights Theater)
- Somebody's Daughter (Cherry Lane Theatre, Second Stage)
- Alondra Was Here (the Wild Project)
- The Wedding Gift (Contemporary American Theatre Festival, Forward Flux)
- Dead & Breathing (Lark Play Development Center, National Black Theater)

== Awards ==
- GLAAD Award (2010)
- Lilly Award (2010)
- New York Innovative Theatre Award (2012)
- Paul Green Award (2013)
- Helen Merrill Award (2013)
- Lanford Wilson Award (2015)
- Kilroys List - Somebody's Daughter (2017)

== Personal life ==
After the opening of her play She Likes Girls in 2008 Hutchinson's sexuality was put into the spotlight because the play centers around a young lesbian woman. Hutchinson however is bisexual.

== Critical reception ==
Hutchinson's play She Likes Girls centers around a young lesbian couple at an inter-city high school. This play and the topics it deals with would lead her to receive a GLAAD (Gay and Lesbian Alliance Against Defamation) Award. Not only did the play win this award but it received positive reviews throughout its run in New York City.

In 2022, Chisa Hutchinson was included in the book 50 Key Figures in Queer US Theatre, profiled in a chapter written by theatre scholar La Donna L. Forsgren.
