= George Jean Nathan Award for Dramatic Criticism =

American dramatic criticism award

- Awarded for: the best piece of drama criticism during the theatrical year
- Country: United States
- Presented by: Yale University, Cornell University, Princeton University
- First award: 1961
- Website: https://english.cornell.edu/george-jean-nathan-award-dramatic-criticism

The George Jean Nathan Award for Dramatic Criticism is administered by the Cornell University Department of English and presented to the writer of "the best piece of drama criticism during the theatrical year (July 1 to June 30), whether it is an article, an essay, treatise or book."

The prize was established by the prominent drama critic, George Jean Nathan, who instructed in his will that the net income of half of his estate be awarded to the recipient of the award. Today, the award amounts to about $10,000. Winners are selected annually by a committee composed of the heads of the English departments at Cornell University, Princeton University, and Yale University.

== Award ==
Following his death in April 1958, George Jean Nathan bequeathed the net income of half of his estate to fund an award for the best piece of criticism in a theatrical year (July to June). The first two prizes—for the 1958-1958 year and the 1959-1960 year—were awarded in June 1961. Per Nathan's bequest, the award is decided by a committee of the English department chairs of Yale University, Princeton University, and Cornell University.

The award has become the most prestigious award specifically designated for theatre criticism. In addition to the monetary prize, the recipient receives a statuette, previously a silver medallion. The committee receives submissions each September. Four men—Robert Brustein, John Lahr, Michael Goldman, and Michael Feingold—have received the award twice.

== Recipients ==
Recipients of the George Jean Nathan Award are as follows:

=== 1950s ===
Year	Name(s)	Institution	Rationale	Ref.
1958-1959	Harold Clurman	Various	"for his book of reviews and essays, Lies Like Truth: Theatre Reviews and Essays"	
1959-1960	C.L. Barber	Amherst College	for the book Shakespeare's Festive Comedy: A Study of Dramatic Form and Its Relation to Social Custom	

=== 1960s ===
Year	Name(s)	Institution	Rationale	Ref.
1960-1961	Jerry Tallmer	The Village Voice	"for reviews, particularly of Off-Broadway theatre, written for the Village Voice"	
1961-1962	Robert Brustein	The New Republic	"for the New Republic reviews, which are characterized by a skillful blend of scholarship, acute critical judgment, wit, and graceful expression"	
1962-1963	Walter Kerr	The New York Times	for the book The Theatre In Spite of Itself, which collected his regular reviews	
1963-1964	Elliot Norton	Boston Record American and Sunday Advertiser	"for his daily reviews for the Boston Record American and Sunday Advertiser"	
1964-1965	Gerald Weales	University of Pennsylvania	"for a series of drama reviews that appeared in Drama Survey"	
1965-1966	Eric Russell Bentley	Various	"for a series of articles, two of which ('Tragico Imperatore' and 'An Un-American Chalk Circle') appeared in the Tulane Drama Review"	
1966-1967	Elizabeth Hardwick	The New York Review of Books	"for a series of reviews and discussions published in the New York Review of Books"	
1967-1968	Martin Gottfried	Women's Wear Daily	"for A Theater Divided: The Postwar American Stage"	
1968-1969	John Lahr	The Village Voice	for his essay "In Search of a New Mythology" in the Evergreen Review	
1969-1970	John Simon	New York	"for reviews published in the Hudson Review and New York magazine"	

=== 1970s ===
Year	Name(s)	Institution	Rationale	Ref.
1970-1971	Richard Gilman	Yale Drama School	"for Common and Uncommon Masks: Writings on Theatre 1961-1970"	
1971-1972	Jay Carr	The Detroit News	"for his daily reviews in the Detroit News"	
1972-1973	Stanley Kauffmann	The New Republic	for his critical reviews of the New York Shakespeare Festival production of Much Ado About Nothing, Arthur Miller’s The Creation of the World and Other Business, David Storey’s The Changing Room, and Chekhov’s Uncle Vanya, and his article 'The Sunshine Boys'"	
1973-1974	Albert Bermel	The New Leader	for "his reviews of the recent productions of Shakespeare’s Richard II and Macbeth, Christopher Hampton’s Total Eclipse, and Leonard Bernstein’s Candide."	
1974-1975	No award			
1975-1976	Michael Goldman	Princeton University	"for The Actor’s Freedom: Toward a Theory of Drama."	
1976-1977	Bernard Knox	Center for Hellenic Studies	"for his review of Andrei Serban’s production of Agamemnon at Lincoln Center, published in the New York Review of Books"	
1977-1978	Mel Gussow	The New York Times	"for his essay 'A Rich Crop of Writing Talent Brings New Life to the American Theater' and for his reporting of modern and classical drama in New York and, frequently, out of town, for the New York Times."	
1978-1979	Jack Kroll	Newsweek	for nine reviews "independent and courageous enough to insist upon the strengths of a play that ha[d] been ignored or panned by other reviewers"	
1979-1980	Sean Mitchell	Dallas Times Herald	"for reviews written for the Dallas Times Herald"	

=== 1980s ===
Year	Name(s)	Institution	Rationale	Ref.
1980-1981	Carolyn Clay	Boston Phoenix	for running "the same risks Nathan ran—the risks of being witty, natural, and clear-headed about a subject they love, the risks of debunking intellectual pretentiousness and abstraction, the risks of remaining true to the practices of theatre people, and insisting that the stage itself deserves the most serious intellectual regard."	
1980-1981	Sylviane Gold	Various	for running "the same risks Nathan ran—the risks of being witty, natural, and clear-headed about a subject they love, the risks of debunking intellectual pretentiousness and abstraction, the risks of remaining true to the practices of theatre people, and insisting that the stage itself deserves the most serious intellectual regard."	
1981-1982	Julius Novick	The Village Voice	for "the consistently high quality of Julius Novick’s frequent reviews in the Village Voice."	
1982-1983	Herbert Blau	Various	for his books "Take Up The Bodies, a critical itinerary of his most recent work and thought, and Blooded Thought, a collection of essays on a variety of theatrical subjects"	
1983-1984	Bonnie Marranca	The New Leader	for her book of essays, Theatrewritings, which includes the essay "The Real Life of María Irene Fornés"	
1984-1985	Jan Kott	Stony Brook University	"for his book of critical essays, The Theater of Essence."	
1985-1986	Gordon Rogoff	The Village Voice	for his Village Voice articles, especially "Theatre Criticism: The Elusive Object, the Fading Craft"	
1986-1987	Robert Brustein	The New Republic/Harvard University	"for his collection of dramatic reviews and opinions, Who Needs Theatre."	
1987-1988	Scott Rosenberg	San Francisco Examiner	for "his September 13, 1987 review of the nine-hour epic The Mahabharata and his penetrating double review of July 3, 1988 of M. Butterfly, and Speed the Plow."	
1988-1989	Eileen Blumenthal	Rutgers University	"for articles on Cambodian Dance, published in the Village Voice, the New York Times, Natural History, and the Wall Street Journal"	
1989-1990	Steven Mikulan	LA Weekly	"for his dramatic reviews and features in the L.A. Weekly"	

=== 1990s ===
Year	Name(s)	Institution	Rationale	Ref.
1990-1991	Jonathan Kalb	New York University Tisch School of the Arts	"for Beckett in Performance and his articles and reviews in the Village Voice"	
1991-1992	Kevin Kelly	The Boston Globe	"for his reviews for the Boston Globe"	
1992-1993	David Cole	Various	"for Acting as Reading: The Place of the Reading Process in the Actor’s Work"	
1993-1994	Marvin Carlson	CUNY Graduate Center	for "his retrospective on the Shakespearean productions of Daniel Mesguich in France, published in Foreign Shakespeare: Contemporary Performance, [which] was felt by the Committee to be the most illuminating single piece of theatre criticism this year."	
1993-1994	John Lahr	The New Yorker	"for reviews published in The New Yorker."	
1994-1995	Robert Hurwitt	San Francisco Examiner	for "his reviews of the New York productions of Stoppard’s Arcadia and Turgenev’s A Month in the Country and of Euripides' Hecuba as produced in San Francisco."	
1995-1996	Michael Feingold	The Village Voice	"for reviews published in the Village Voice"	
1996-1997	Ben Brantley	The New York Times	"for his reviews in the New York Times"	
1996-1997	Elinor Fuchs	Various	"for her book The Death of Character"	
1996-1997	Todd London	American Theatre	"for contributions to American Theatre"	
1997-1998	Alisa Solomon	Various	"for Re-Dressing the Canon: Essays on Theatre and Gender"	
1998-1999	Michael Goldman	Princeton University	"for Ibsen: The Dramaturgy of Fear"	
1999-2000	Albert Williams	Chicago Reader	"for his reviews for the Chicago Reader"	

=== 2000s ===
Year	Name(s)	Institution	Rationale	Ref.
2000-2001	Laurence Senelick	Various	for "The Changing Room: Sex, Drag, and Theatre, [. . .]an encyclopedic study of the history of crossdressing, onstage and off	
2001-2002	Daniel Mendelsohn	The New York Review of Books	for "three articles for the New York Review of Books"	
2002-2003	Hilton Als	The New Yorker	for "his passion for great acting, his admiration for theatrical style, and his sense of the importance of historical and cultural context in a series of witty, intelligent, and sometimes deliciously argumentative reviews for The New Yorker."	
2003-2004	Trey Graham	Washington City Paper	for a "review of Caryl Churchill's Far Away—a moving display of how the pressures exerted by a new and difficult theatrical work can produce a gem of a critical essay."	
2004-2005	Raymond Knapp	University of California, Los Angeles	"for The American Musical and the Formation of National Identity"	
2005-2006	Charles Isherwood	The New York Times	for "penetrating analyses of the contemporary theatre, with cogent appraisals of all production elements and careful attention to the interplay of acting, directing, design, and dramaturgy."	
2006-2007	H. Scott McMillin, Jr.	Cornell University	for The Musical as Drama	
2007-2008	Randy Gener	American Theatre	"for his essays in American Theatre"	
2008-2009	Marc Robinson	Yale University	"for his book The American Play 1787-2000"	
2009-2010	Charles McNulty	Los Angeles Times	"for his theatre reviews and essays published in the Los Angeles Times."	

=== 2010s ===
Year	Name(s)	Institution	Rationale	Ref.
2010-2011	Jill Dolan	Princeton University	" for her consistently thoughtful and articulate discussions of the contemporary stage", especially in The Feminist Spectator blog	
2011-2012	Kenneth Gross	University of Rochester	"for Puppet: An Essay on Uncanny Life"	
2011-2012	Jonathan Kalb	New York University Tisch School of the Arts	"for Great Lengths: Seven Works of Marathon Theater"	
2012-2013	Scott Brown	New York	for reviews of David M. Levine's Habit and Richard Nelson's Sorry	
2013-2014	Michael Feingold	Theatermania	for his bi-monthly "Thinking About Theatre" for Theatermania	
2014-2015	Brian Eugenio Herrera	Various	"for Latin Numbers: Playing Latino in Twentieth-Century U.S. Popular Performance"	
2014-2015	Chris Jones	Chicago Tribune	"for his theater criticism for the Chicago Tribune", especially a review of American Theater Company's The Project(s)	
2015-2016	Shonni Enelow	Fordham University	"for Method Acting and Its Discontents: On American Psycho-Drama"	
2016-2017	Sara Holdren	New York	for her essay "The Revolution Will Not Be Hashtagged: A Misguided Joan of Arc at the Public Theatre”	
2017-2018	John H. Muse	University of Chicago	for Microdramas: Crucibles for Theater and Time	
2017-2018	Helen Shaw	Various	for her reviews in different publications, especially a review of Théâtre du Soleil's A Room in India	
2018-2019	Soraya Nadia McDonald	The Undefeated	for her theater essays for The Undefeated, especially a review of King Kong	
2019-2020	Alexis Soloski	The New York Times	for her reviews of theater performances during the COVID-19 pandemic, especially the essay "There’s No Place Like Home (Theater)	

=== 2020s ===
Year	Name(s)	Institution	Rationale	Ref.
2020-2021	Maya Phillips	The New York Times	for "her reviews of James Ijames’s “brutal” comedy, The Most Spectacularly Lamentable Trial of Miz Martha Washington, and Claudia Rankine’s November, the latter published on the eve of the 2020 election"	
2021-2022	Vinson Cunningham	The New Yorker	for his reviews in The New Yorker	
2022-2023	Rhoda Feng	Various	for her freelance reviews, especially a "combined review of Shaina Taub’s Suffs and Ntozake Shange’s for colored girls who have considered suicide/when the rainbow is enuf, published in LIBER: A Feminist Review"	
2023-2024	Brittani Samuel	3Views	for "her New York Times review of Raja Feather Kelly’s The Fires"	
2024-2025	Masi Asare	Northwestern University	for Blues Mamas & Broadway Belters: Black Women, Voice, and the Musical Stage	
2024-2025	Billy McEntree	The Brooklyn Rail	for his criticism with The Brooklyn Rail and other outlets, especially a review of Redwood	

== See also ==
- Theatre criticism
