= Thomas Wallis =

Thomas Wallis may refer to:

- Thomas Wallis (architect)
- Thomas Wallis (priest)
- Thomas Wallis (rugby union)
- Thomas Wallis, known as Whipping Tom

== See also ==
- Wallis Thomas, Church in Wales priest
