= American Society for Theatre Research =

Nonprofit organization

American Society for Theatre Research (ASTR) is a non-profit organization established in 1956.

== Activities ==
It publishes the journal Theatre Survey.

The American Theatre Archive Project (ATAP), an initiative of the American Society for Theatre Research, archives records of theatre makers' work for artists, scholars, and the public.

It is a member of the American Council of Learned Societies.

== Awards ==
The society gives a number of awards to recognise theatre scholarship. These include the Gerald Kahan Scholar's Prize, the Errol Hill Award, the Barnard Hewitt Award and a Distinguished Scholar Award.

Notable award recipients include Sue-Ellen Case, who was awarded a Distinguished Scholar Award in 2007, followed by a Lifetime Achievement Award. Distinguished Scholars include Helen Krich Chinoy (1985), Marvin Carlson (2001), Laurence Senelick (2002), Susan Bennett (2016), David Savran (2014), Jill Dolan (2013), and Elinor Fuchs (2018).
