= Gordon Rogoff =

American theatre director (1931–2024)

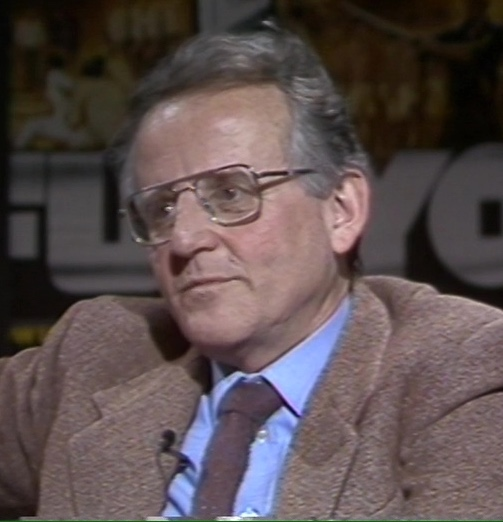
Rogoff discusses Unfinished Piece for Player Piano on CUNY TV's Cinema Then, Cinema Now (1987)

Gordon Rogoff (May 17, 1931 – January 26, 2024) was an American theatre director, dramaturge, professor, and theatre critic.

== Life and work ==
Rogoff graduated with a bachelor's of arts from Yale University in 1952. He was a professor emeritus of Dramaturgy and Dramatic Criticism at Yale School of Drama.

During the 1970s, Rogoff was the director of the Center for Theatre Research at SUNY Buffalo. He also worked with the Actors Studio and The Open Theater, both in Manhattan, New York.

Rogoff was a theatre critic for The Village Voice during the 1970s and 1980s.] He also wrote for The Nation, The New Republic, The Virginia Quarterly Review, and The Reporter, as well as Parnassus: Poetry in Review and The Yale Review. He served on the editorial board of Theater during the 1970s alongside Michael Feingold, Ren Frutkin, and Richard Gilman.

Rogoff published multiple books, including Theater is Not Safe and Vanishing Acts: Theater Since the Sixties (2000). Vanishing Acts was published by Yale University Press and compiled Rogoff's writing on theatre artists including Peter Brook, Robert Wilson, Ariane Mnouchkine, Samuel Beckett, Tennessee Williams, Alban Berg, Tony Kushner, Laurence Olivier, Donald Wolfit, Judi Dench, Anthony Hopkins, Dustin Hoffman, Al Pacino, Lee J. Cobb, Vanessa Redgrave, Geraldine Page, Joseph Papp, Eugene O'Neill, and Arthur Miller, among others.

His life partner was playwright and visual artist Morton Lichter.

Rogoff died on January 26, 2024, at the age of 92.

== Awards and recognition ==
- 1973: Guggenheim Fellowship (theatre arts)
- 1976: Obie Award (with Morton Lichter), Old Timers' Sexual Symphony
- 1985-86: George Jean Nathan Award for Dramatic Criticism
- 1991: Morton Dauwen Zabel Award for Criticism, The American Academy of Arts and Letters
- 2009, 2011, 2013: fellowship, The Bogliasco Foundation
