= Kenneth Gross =

Kenneth Gross may refer to:

- Kenneth I. Gross (1938–2017), American mathematician
- Kenneth Gross (politician) (1924–1989), Australian politician
- Kenneth Gross (scholar) (born 1954), American literary scholar
