= David Savran =

- Born: 1950 (age 75–76)
- Education: Cornell University
- Occupation: Distinguished Professor of Theatre
- Employer: The Graduate Center, CUNY
- Notable work: Communists, Cowboys and Queers: The Politics of Masculinity in the Work of Arthur Miller and Tennessee Williams; Highbrow/Lowdown: Theater, Jazz, and the Making of the New Middle Class

David Savran (born 1950) is a scholar of twentieth and twenty-first century theatre, music theatre, US theatre, popular culture, gender studies, and social theory. He is a Distinguished Professor of Theatre and holds the Vera Mowry Roberts Chair in American Theatre at The Graduate Center of the City University of New York.

== Career ==
Savran graduated from Kent School in 1968. He holds a B.A. in English from Harvard University and an M.F.A. in Directing from Carnegie Mellon University. Savran earned his Ph.D. in Theatre Arts from Cornell University in 1978 where he studied under Marvin Carlson and Bert O. States. His dissertation was titled The Mask and the Face: Acting Theory of the Renaissance and the Enlightenment.

Savran held a position as Professor of English at Brown University from 1988 until 2001. He was appointed to Distinguished Professor in the Ph.D. Program of Theatre at The Graduate Center, CUNY.

He served as editor and then co-editor of the Journal of American Drama and Theatre from 2004 until 2013; he continues to serve as the advisory editor of the performance journal. In 2011 and 2012, Savran served on the jury for the Pulitzer Prize for Drama. In 2014, Savran received the Distinguished Scholar Award from the American Society for Theatre Research.

Savran received a fellowship at the International Center for Interweaving Performance Cultures at the Freie Universität Berlin in 2012 and again in 2014 to work on his most recent book project. His new work theorizes branding as a cultural performance and studies the international traffic in U.S.-branded theatre since the 1990s. Focusing on musical theatre in particular, it analyzes the cultural exchanges between the U.S. and Germany and the U.S. and South Korea.

== Books ==
- Highbrow/Lowdown: Theater, Jazz, and the Making of the New Middle Class. Ann Arbor: University of Michigan Press, 2009.
- A Queer Sort of Materialism: Recontextualizing American Theater. Ann Arbor: University of Michigan Press, 2003.
- The Masculinity Studies Reader. Co-edited with Rachel Adams. Malden, Mass.: Blackwell Publishers, 2002.
- The Playwright’s Voice: American Dramatists on Memory, Writing, and the Politics of Culture. New York: Theatre Communications Group, 1999.
- Taking it Like a Man: White Masculinity, Masochism, and Contemporary American Culture. Princeton: Princeton University Press, 1998.
- Communists, Cowboys, and Queers: The Politics of Masculinity in the Work of Arthur Miller and Tennessee Williams. Minneapolis: University of Minnesota Press, 1992.
- In Their Own Words: Contemporary American Playwrights. New York: Theatre Communications Group, 1988.
- Breaking the Rules: The Wooster Group. New York: Theatre Communications Group, 1988. (Reprint of The Wooster Group, 1975-1985: Breaking the Rules. Ann Arbor: UMI Research Press, 1986.)

== Reception ==
Savran's most recent publication, Highbrow/Lowdown: Theater, Jazz, and the Making of the New Middle Class, was the winner of the Joe A. Callaway Award for Best Book in Theater and Drama and the 2011 Kurt Weill Article Prize. The book also received honorable mention for the Barnard Hewitt Award from the American Society for Theatre Research.
