= Margaret Baldwin =

Margaret Baldwin may refer to:

- Margaret Baldwin Weis (born 1948), American fantasy and science fiction writer
- Peggy Baldwin, fictional character from All for Peggy
- Margaret Baldwin (playwright) at Offstage Theatre
