= Michael Feingold =

American theater critic, translator and playwright (1945–2022)

- Accepting the Nathan Award in 2015
- Born: May 5, 1945; Chicago, Illinois, U.S.
- Died: November 21, 2022 (aged 77); Manhattan, New York City
- Education: Columbia University (BA); Yale School of Drama (MFA)
- Occupations: Theater critic, translator, and playwright
- Employer: The Village Voice (1971–2013)
- Awards: Guggenheim Fellowship (1977)

Michael E. Feingold (May 5, 1945 – November 21, 2022) was an American critic, translator, lyricist, playwright and dramaturg. He was the lead theater critic of The Village Voice from 1982 to 2013, for which he was twice named a Pulitzer Prize for Criticism finalist, and was a two-time recipient of the George Jean Nathan Award for Dramatic Criticism. He was a judge for the Obie Awards for 31 years, and the chairman for nine years. For his work as the translator and adapter of the book and lyrics of the Kurt Weill, Elisabeth Hauptmann, and Bertolt Brecht musical Happy End, he was nominated for two Tony Awards in 1977.

== Life and career ==
Feingold was born on May 5, 1945, in Chicago, Illinois to Elsie (Silver) Feingold, a piano teacher, and Bernard Feingold, who managed a tannery. He grew up in Chicago and in Highland Park, where he attended the local high school and was a member of the school's drama club. He graduated from Columbia University in 1966 with a degree in English and comparative literature.

Having taken a seminar at Columbia from theatre critic Robert Brustein, Feingold applied to Yale School of Drama in 1965, and asked Brustein to write a recommendation. Brustein told him to read The New York Times the next day where it was announced that Brustein had been named the dean, and he accepted Feingold's application.

At Yale, Feingold intended to study playwriting, but moved towards criticism at Brustein's suggestion. He was the first literary manager of the Yale Repertory Theatre, and served as literary director of The Guthrie Theater in Minneapolis and literary manager of the American Repertory Theater in Cambridge, Massachusetts.

In 1982, Feingold was serving as a dramaturg for the National Playwrights Conference at the Eugene O'Neill Theater Center in Waterford, Connecticut, and was instrumental in furthering the career of playwright August Wilson, helping to edit Ma Rainey's Black Bottom, which impressed New York Times theatre critic Frank Rich, who was in the audience for the reading of the trimmed-down version of the play. Rich's write-up in the Times began Wilson's rise in American theatre.

Feingold began contributing to the Village Voice in 1971 and served as its chief theater critic from 1983 through May 2013.

=== Playwright and translator ===
Feingold was a playwright, and translated German and Italian plays and operas into English for off-Broadway productions, including Bertolt Brecht and Kurt Weill's The Threepenny Opera, Max Frisch's The Firebugs, The Beaver Coat by Gerhart Hauptmann, The Venetian Twins, The Barber of Seville, The Mistress of the Inn, Der Vampyr, and Mary Stuart, as well as the French playwright Henri Bernstein's 1908 play Israël, which had a public reading in 2007, and Max Frisch's Andorra (1961), produced off-Broadway in 2022. Feingold's translations of Bertolt Brecht and Kurt Weill's musical collaborations are the standard published English translations. Feingold wrote in 1998 about Brecht and translation:

In English, translation has let Brecht down more than most European authors precisely because the challenges he offers are wider ranging as well as more difficult. Adaptors who catch the theatrical saltiness unwittingly strain out the poetic pepper; academics, busily measuring the exact ingredients, often omit the flavor altogether.

He shared nominations for two Tony Awards in 1977 for the Brecht-Weill musical "Happy End": for Best Book of a Musical, for his adaptation of Elisabeth Hauptmann's libretto, and for Best Score, for his adaptation of Bertolt Brecht's lyrics. The production included Meryl Streep and Christopher Lloyd in the cast. Feingold's translation of The Threepenny Opera was staged on Broadway in 1989, starring Sting and has been presented in many venues throughout the world. Feingold's translation of Weill's and Brecht's The Rise and Fall of the City of Mahagonny, as staged by the Los Angeles Opera at the Dorothy Chandler Pavilion, with performances by Audra McDonald and Patti LuPone, was broadcast on the PBS Great Performances TV series in 2007, and was released on CD as well.

Another Brecht work which Feingold translated was Round Heads and Pointed Heads, with music by Hanns Eisler, which, as adapted by director/choreographer David Gordon, was presented under the title Uncivil Wars: Moving with Brecht and Eisler in a number of venues between 2002 and 2009. Feingold was also the translation lyricist for the 1972 revue Berlin to Broadway with Kurt Weill.

=== Later career ===
On May 17, 2013, after 42 years as a writer at the Village Voice, and over three decades as its primary theater critic, Feingold's contract was not renewed. Afterwards, he wrote a monthly two-part column, "Thinking About Theater", for the Theater Mania website from 2013 to 2017, and also wrote 35 columns for New York Stage Review beginning in October 2018. In his columns for NYSR, Feingold did not review individual productions, but instead sought "to pull together some general reflections, linking the theater to the world outside, and linking our theater’s many diverse parts to each other."

On January 12, 2016, Feingold announced his return to the Village Voice to write a twice-monthly column for a new Voice website.

Feingold was a judge for the Obie Awards for 31 seasons, and served as its chairman from 2006 to 2011 and from 2012 to 2014. (Note: In 2006, as chairman, Feingold presented Czech playwright and politician Václav Havel with the Obie Awards he won in 1970 and 1984 but was not able to accept; the Obie Havel won in 1968 had been smuggled to him in prison in 1984 by Joseph Papp, the producer of the New York Shakespeare Festival.) In 2020, Feingold received an Obie Award citation "for his work as a leading voice in theater criticism, his advocacy on behalf of off and off-off-Broadway, and for his masterful leadership of the Obie Awards."

Feingold was a member of the New York Drama Critics Circle, which presents the annual New York Drama Critics Circle Awards.

=== Awards and honors ===
Feingold was a recipient of the Guggenheim Fellowship in 1977. He was also a two-time recipient of the George Jean Nathan Award for Dramatic Criticism, first for his 1995–1996 season Village Voice reviews, and then in 2015 for his Theater Mania columns in the 2013–2014 season. He was twice a finalist for the Pulitzer Prize for Criticism, in 1992 and 2010.

For the 2023 Obie Awards presented by the American Theater Wing on February 27, it was announced that one of the awards will be named in honor of Feingold.

=== Characteristics and views ===
One of Feingold's colleagues said of him that when he attacked something he did not like, such as the Broadway production of Miss Saigon, he "would back [the] attack with broad knowledge of the subject at hand and thereby supply insightful aesthetic, historical, formal, and conceptual context to [his] readers." In a review of Miss Saigon which would later be characterized as "legendary", Feingold wrote "If the theater 30 years ago had been, in general, like the theater we have today, I would probably have gone into some better-paying business." He continued:

Every civilization gets the theater it deserves, and we get ‘Miss Saigon,’ which means we can now say definitively that our civilization is over. ... After this, I see no way out but an aggressive clearance program: All the Broadway theaters must be demolished, without regard for their size, history or landmark status.

Feingold's willingness to speak bluntly to the luminaries of theater was also evident in his 2003 review of Neil Simon's final play, Rose’s Dilemma: "It doesn’t mean anything to anybody," he wrote, "and doesn’t reveal any understanding, on its author’s part, of how plays are written."

Another colleague, Los Angeles Times theatre critic Charles McNulty, Feingold's editor at The Village Voice, called Feingold "[a] polyglot and polymath with a deep knowledge of opera and music" and "an unstoppable font of cultural knowledge and insight", and praised his commitment to theatrical tradition. However, he also wrote that Feingold was "not a mentor", was a "territorial animal in a jungle", and that he "treated every underling as a future rival." Feingold, in McNulty's view, had a "recalcitrant and somewhat paranoiac nature [that] made him at times an exasperating colleague. But underneath his curmudgeonly carapace was the sadness of a writer who felt he hadn’t ever been given his due. ... Feingold had a way of alienating even his supporters."

But, according to McNulty:

Feingold’s greatness rested in the agility of his focus. He had the ability to take an aerial view of the work under consideration. But then, with breathtaking swiftness, he would zoom in for a closeup, discussing the production with meticulous visual detail and sensitivity to the choices of the actors and director.

He wrote with an understanding of the practical demands of theatrical production. But he was unusually mindful of the road not taken, of interpretive possibilities excluded by short-sighted artistic decision-making. Feingold wrote for insiders, in which group he included everyone with a passionate regard for the art form. He most assuredly was not writing for consumers casually wondering where to spend their entertainment dollars on a Saturday night.

His loyalty was to the theatre and its tenuous survival. ... [T]he chief limitation of his criticism is tied to one of his main strengths: the clarity of his unassailable conviction ... [A] complex humanity was always reachable via his sterling intelligence, and his robust wit had a way of offsetting the pedantic tone that would creep into his prose.

Benjamin Ivry, writing in The Forward, praised Feingold's "charity, sensitivity and a gift for playwriting" and his "historical awareness, good citizenship, and erudition." Journalist and author Robert Simonson said of Feingold that his writing showed "erudition and understanding of theater history, both ancient and modern, and how current plays fit in with that continuum."

In his introduction to Grove New American Theater (1993), which he edited, Feingold wrote:

If the theater doesn’t grow up, the American public doesn’t grow up either. Instead, it gets hotted up, every 20 years or so, over the same issues — sex, politics and religion — the three matters that art, according to some strangely permanent lunatic fringe of American opinion, must never be allowed to deal with, at least not in any open manner.

When he returned to writing for the Village Voice in 2016, his summary of the state of American theater criticism in his first column was also harsh:

Instant results, instantly commented on, then instantly archived and forgotten, now constitute the basic product that people demand from what used to be called journalism.

During the Covid shut-down, when theaters were dark, Feingold extolled the virtues of film for theater audiences in a series of columns called "Old Movies for Theater Lovers". He wrote that "The theater lives again in cinema, and the cinema, with help from the theater’s effect, brings something alive in you."

=== Death ===
Feingold died on November 21, 2022, at Mount Sinai Morningside Hospital in Manhattan, New York City from aortic valve disease at the age of 77.

== Works ==
- 1971 - editor: The Winter Repertory 3: Sarah B. Divine! and Other Plays By Tom Eyen. Winter House Ltd.
- 1972 - editor: Robert Patricks Cheep Theatricks: Plays, Monologues And Sketches. New York: Samuel French. ISBN 978-0573600364
- 1982 - adapter: Happy End: A Melodrama With Songs. New York: Samuel French ISBN 978-0573681905
- 1984 - author: Barron's Book Notes: William Shakespeare's Hamlet. Barron's Educational Series. ISBN 9780812034172
- 1988 - translator: The Black Mask: Opera in One Act, Based on the Play of the Same Name By Gerhardt Hauptman. Schott.
- 1993 - editor: Classic Women Playwrights 1660-1860. Penguin Books Australia. ISBN 978-0140116199
- 1994 - editor: Grove New American Theater: An Anthology. New York: Grove Press. ISBN 9780802132789
- 2000 - playwright: Scribe's Paradox or the Mechanical Rabbit (A Play). Applause Publishers.
- 2002 - translator: The Venetian Twins. New York: Samuel French. ISBN 978-0573627637
