= Helen Shaw (theater critic) =

American theater critic

- Born: Helen E. Shaw
- Occupation: Theater critic
- Education: Harvard University (BA, MFA)

Helen Shaw is an American theater critic. She is the chief theater critic for The New York Times. She was previously theater critic at The New Yorker and New York magazine.

== Early life ==
Shaw grew up in Lawrence, Kansas, where her parents took her to see plays. She attended Harvard University, where she designed sets, studied with Robert Brustein, and was president of the Harvard–Radcliffe Dramatic Club. In 2002, she received an MFA in dramaturgy from the Institute for Advanced Theater Training.

== Career ==
Shaw moved to New York City in 2002. She worked as an assistant director and dramaturg for Simon McBurney and Martha Clarke, but didn't plan to pursue it as a career. Her first writing job was with The New York Sun, covering the New York Fringe. Before joining New York and Vulture as theater critic in 2019, Shaw wrote journalism and criticism for outlets including Time Out New York, The Village Voice, The New York Times, American Theatre, Artforum, The Guardian, Art in America and 4Columns.

She was a 2014 MacDowell Fellow. She received the 2017-18 George Jean Nathan Award for Dramatic Criticism.

Shaw's 2015 negative review of Aya Ogawa's Ludic Proxy in Time Out New York was a "catalyst" for Ogawa's later play, The Nosebleed.

From 2022 through 2025, she was a staff writer and theater critic at The New Yorker. She won the 2025 Grace Dudley Prize for Arts Writing.

In December 2025, The New York Times announced Shaw would be starting in mid-January 2026 as chief theater critic.

She was a member of the New York Drama Critics' Circle from 2017 until joining the Times, whose policy forbids participating in awards voting.

Shaw teaches at Yale and New York University.

== Personal life ==
Shaw lives in Brooklyn.
