= Michael Goldman (poet) =

American literary scholar

Michael Goldman (May 11, 1936 - August 17, 2023) was an American literary scholar, poet and professor of English. He specialized in the study of drama, including the works of William Shakespeare and Henrik Ibsen.

Goldman taught English at Princeton University from 1975 until his retirement in 2001. Prior to Princeton, Goldman taught at Columbia University and Queens College, City University of New York. He specialized in teaching drama, and many of his students went on to successful careers on the stage and screen. His students included Jennie Snyder Urman and Richard Greenberg.

Goldman wrote seven books throughout his career, including two collections of poetry. His 1973 book Shakespeare and the Energies of Drama was a finalist for the National Book Award for Nonfiction. The book examines Shakespeare's plays and studies especially how they resonate with the audience. Reviewers in Shakespeare Quarterly likened the literary scholarship in the book as loosely similar to that of Harley Granville-Barker.

He received the George Jean Nathan Award for Dramatic Criticism for his books The Actor's Freedom (1976) and Ibsen: The Dramaturgy of Fear (2000). He is one of 4 literary scholars to have been awarded the Nathan Award twice.

As a poet, Goldman's poems appeared in The New Yorker and The Times Literary Supplement. His first poem was published in The New Yorker when he was only 19 years old. He wrote two collections of poetry: First Poems and At the Edge. His poems also appeared in the anthology The Best American Poetry 2003. Also trained as an actor and baritone singer, Goldman often performed poems, performed radio acting, and sang show tunes on National Public Radio.

Goldman received fellowships from the National Endowment for the Humanities, the American Council of Learned Societies, and a Guggenheim Fellowship in 1977.

He was married to Eleanor Bergstein for over 50 years. Eleanor was a writer and producer for the film Dirty Dancing. Michael wrote the Kellerman's Anthem performed at the fictional Kellerman's Resort in the movie.
