= Eleanor Bergstein =

American screenwriter

- Born: Eleanor Bergstein; April 17, 1938 (age 88); New York, New York, U.S.
- Education: University of Pennsylvania
- Spouse: Michael Paul Goldman (m. 1965; died 2023)
- Writing career
- Subject: American film

Eleanor Bergstein (born April 17, 1938) is an American writer, known for writing and co-producing Dirty Dancing, a popular 1980s film based in large part on her own childhood.

== Life and career ==
Bergstein was born in 1938 in the Brooklyn borough of New York City. She has one older sister, Frances, in her Jewish family. Their father, Joseph, was a doctor who left much of the care of the girls to their mother, Sarah. The family spent summers in the luxury resort Grossinger's Catskill Resort Hotel in the Catskill Mountains; and, while her parents were playing golf, Bergstein was dancing.

Bergstein was a teenage Mambo queen, competing in local competitions. While at college, she worked as a dance instructor at Arthur Murray dance studios. Bergstein graduated from the University of Pennsylvania in 1958.

In 1965, she married literary scholar and poet Michael Paul Goldman. They were married until his death in 2023. She worked as a novelist, including Advancing Paul Newman. This novel contains many of the themes of her famous movie. She also tried her hand at scriptwriting and had success with It's My Turn, a film starring Michael Douglas and Jill Clayburgh. During production, the producers cut an erotic dance scene from the script. That sparked Bergstein into writing a more extensive story, focusing on "dirty dancing".

The movie Dirty Dancing was released in theaters in 1987.

In 2004, Bergstein also adapted the movie into a stage version of Dirty Dancing, which became a musical. The show opened in 2004 in Australia.

== Works ==
- Dirty Dancing: The Musical, 2004 stage production
- Let It Be Me, 1995 film
- Ex-Lover: A Novel, 1989 novel
- Dirty Dancing, 1987 film
- It's My Turn, 1980 screenplay
- Advancing Paul Newman, 1973 novel
