= Let It Be Me (1995 film) =

- Directed by: Eleanor Bergstein
- Screenplay by: Eleanor Bergstein
- Produced by: Eleanor Bergstein
- Starring: Campbell Scott; Jennifer Beals; Yancy Butler; Patrick Stewart; James Goodwin; Leslie Caron
- Cinematography: Miroslav Ondrícek
- Edited by: Patricia Bowers; Ray Hubley; Bill Pankow
- Music by: Joseph Vitarelli
- Production company: Rysher Entertainment
- Distributed by: Savoy Pictures
- Release date: November 17, 1995
- Running time: 88 minutes
- Country: United States
- Language: English
- Budget: $21 million

Let It Be Me (also known as Love Dance) is a 1995 musical film starring Campbell Scott, Jennifer Beals, Yancy Butler, Leslie Caron, James Goodwin and Patrick Stewart. It was written, produced and directed by Eleanor Bergstein. It was released by Savoy Pictures. It was intended to have a wide release in the US, but left unreleased in the country.

== Plot ==
After becoming engaged to Emily Taylor, Dr. Gabe Rodman finds himself watching a graceful pair of dancers in a dance studio window. Hoping to learn to dance for his upcoming wedding, Gabe enters the studio to take lessons. While interested in his dance teacher Corrine, he finds that he is still looking forward to his wedding, but things change when he has Emily come in for her lessons.

== Cast ==
- Campbell Scott as Dr. Gabriel Rodman
- Jennifer Beals as Emily Taylor
- Yancy Butler as Corrine
- Patrick Stewart as John
- James Goodwin as Bud
- Leslie Caron as Marguerite
- Josh Mostel as Jordan
- J. Smith-Cameron as Clarice
- Daniel McDonald as Fred
- Elise Neal as Carlita
- Christopher Bowen as Sam
- Heather Graham as Salesgirl
- Katharine Houghton as Homeless Woman
- George T. Odom as Food Line Person
- Jessica Stone as Rosie
- Michael Genet as Panhandler
- Daniel Zelman as Gabe's Friend
- Tasha Smith as Student

== Soundtrack ==
Let It Be Me

Soundtrack album from Let It Be Me by Various Artists
- Released: 1995
- Genre: Soundtrack

Let It Be Me is a soundtrack album for the 1995 film of the same name.

No.	Title	Performed by	Length
1.	"Hey Now"	Red Garland	3:47
2.	"Don't Leave Me This Way"	Thelma Houston	3:29
3.	"C Jam Blues"	Red Garland	2:37
4.	"Return to Innocence"	Enigma	4:03
5.	"Missing You"	John Waite	3:56
6.	"Get on Your Feet"	Gloria Estefan	3:39
7.	"Everywhere"	Fleetwood Mac	3:43
8.	"How Long"	Ace	3:22
9.	"Stayin' Alive"	Bee Gees	3:25
10.	"Ordinary Miracle"	Donna Summer	4:24
11.	"Dance with Me"	The Drifters	2:28
12.	"Blame It on My Youth"	Frank Sinatra	2:55
13.	"Let It Be Me"	Roberta Flack	5:00
Total length:			43:09
