= Whipping Tom =

Three 17th- and 18th-century perverts

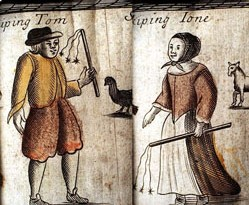
"Whipping Tom" and "Skipping Ione" (Joan), c. 1681 (Note: It is not known whom "Skipping Ione" represents, and there are no other references to her; it is likely that she was invented by the artist as a partner for Whipping Tom.)

"Whipping Tom" was the nickname given to attackers involved in three episodes of sexual assaults in London and the nearby village of Hackney. In all three, women walking alone were attacked and their buttocks thrashed, sometimes leading to serious injuries and—in one case—miscarriage and death.

While there is some evidence that the first attacker in around 1672 was nicknamed "Whipping Tom" and carried out such attacks on women, only scant details are seen in one contemporary record. For the Whipping Tom of 1681 there are more complete records. He would approach unaccompanied women in alleys and courtyards at the east side of the city, bend them over his knee, lift their dress and spank them on the buttocks before fleeing. The speed of his attacks and disappearances led many to think he had supernatural powers. The inability of the authorities to apprehend the offender caused complaints about the ineffectiveness of London's watchmen, and prompted vigilante patrols in the affected areas. Two men were captured and imprisoned for the attacks, one of whom was a local haberdasher.

A third attacker nicknamed "Whipping Tom" was active in late 1712 in Hackney, then a village outside London. This attacker would approach lone women and beat them on their buttocks with a birch rod, violently enough to draw blood. Around 70 attacks were carried out before a local man named Thomas Wallis was captured and confessed to the attacks. He was sentenced to imprisonment for one year, during which he was to be birched twice a week by two maids. He was also to be stood in the pillory five times during the year and on his release made to run the gauntlet through two hundred women.

== 1681 ==
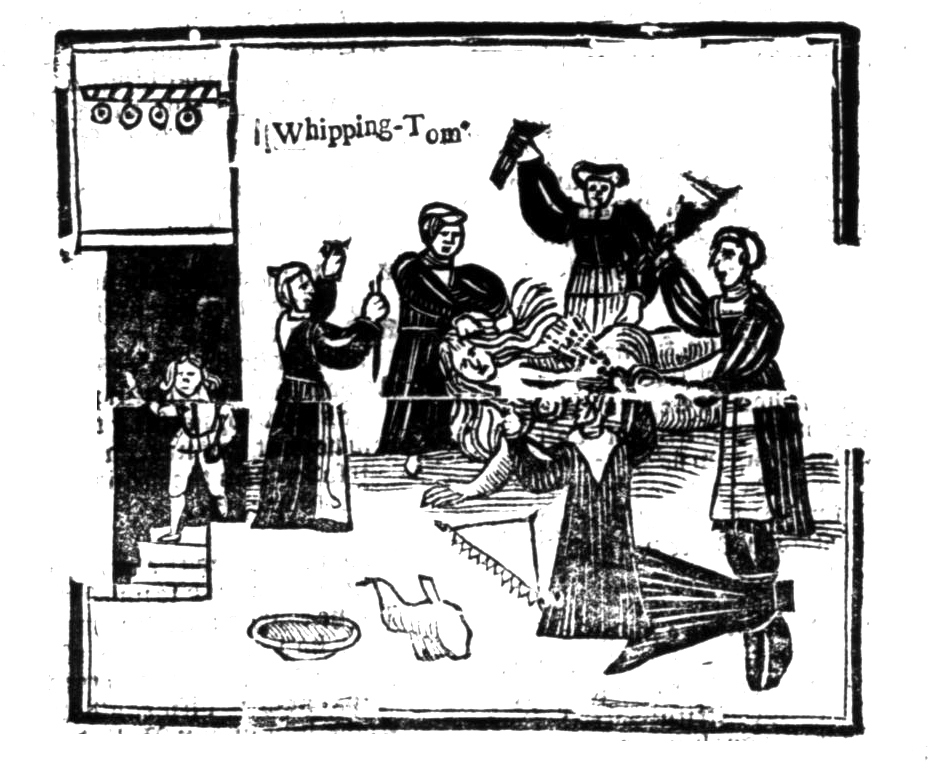
Whipping-Tom, imagined in 1684

The Whipping Tom of 1681 was active in the warren of small courtyards around Fleet Street, the Strand, Fetter Lane and Holborn, where he would wait after dark for unaccompanied women. It was reported that he approached his victims, "seize[ed] upon such as he can conveniently light on, and turning them up as nimble as an eel, ... [made] their Butt ends cry Spanko; and then ... vanished". (Note: Rather than his victims' "Butt ends cry[ing] Spanko", sources have subsequently described Whipping Tom as the one shouting "Spanko!".) His probable first attack was in New Street on a maid servant:

... who being sent out to look for her master, as she was turning a corner, perceived a tall black man standing up against the wall, as if he had been making water, but she had not passed far, but with great speed and violence seized her, and in a trice, laying her across his knee, took up her linen, and laid so hard up-on her backside, as made her cry out most piteously for help, the which he no sooner perceiving to approach (as she declares) then he vanished.

The description of a "tall black man" is possibly a reference to his clothing (including wearing a black mask), or the practice of referring to the Devil as a "black man", rather than Whipping Tom's ethnicity. The historian Sarah Toulalan observes that the description of the attack is ambiguous: he "laid so hard up-on her backside" could be either construed as spanking or sex. (Note: The original wording is presented as "lay'd so hard-up".)

For his attacks, Whipping Tom would often use his bare hand, although he would occasionally use a rod. He attacked a large number of women, and some of his victims were left badly injured by the attacks. One pregnant woman who was attacked but not spanked was so scared that she miscarried and died a week later. His victims would report that their assailant would appear, carry out his attacks and vanish with speed; because of his ability to seemingly disappear, some people attributed him with supernatural powers.

The attacks caused public consternation and demands for his capture. Patrols of vigilantes tried to capture him but failed, and some men would dress in women's clothing in an attempt to capture him; none succeeded, nor did the watchmen who patrolled London's streets. While many women stopped going out after dark, those that did would "go armed with penknives, sharp bodkins, scissors and the like", although one woman who was attacked and spanked stated that her assailant was wearing armour. Many of Whipping Tom's victims were prostitutes and a pamphlet from 1684 called him "The Crack's Terror"—"crack" was a slang term for prostitute. The legal scholar Christopher Hamerton considers that there were some who saw Whipping Tom as a moral crusader, providing a form of social justice against dissolute women.

The historian and diarist Narcissus Luttrell reported that there were two assailants imprisoned for the offences; one was a haberdasher from Holborn. Although most sources describe there being two assailants, a letter in 1681 from Lady Anne Stowe to Catherine Manners, Duchess of Rutland, describes "a company of men, they say fifty or more, which are called Whipping Tom".

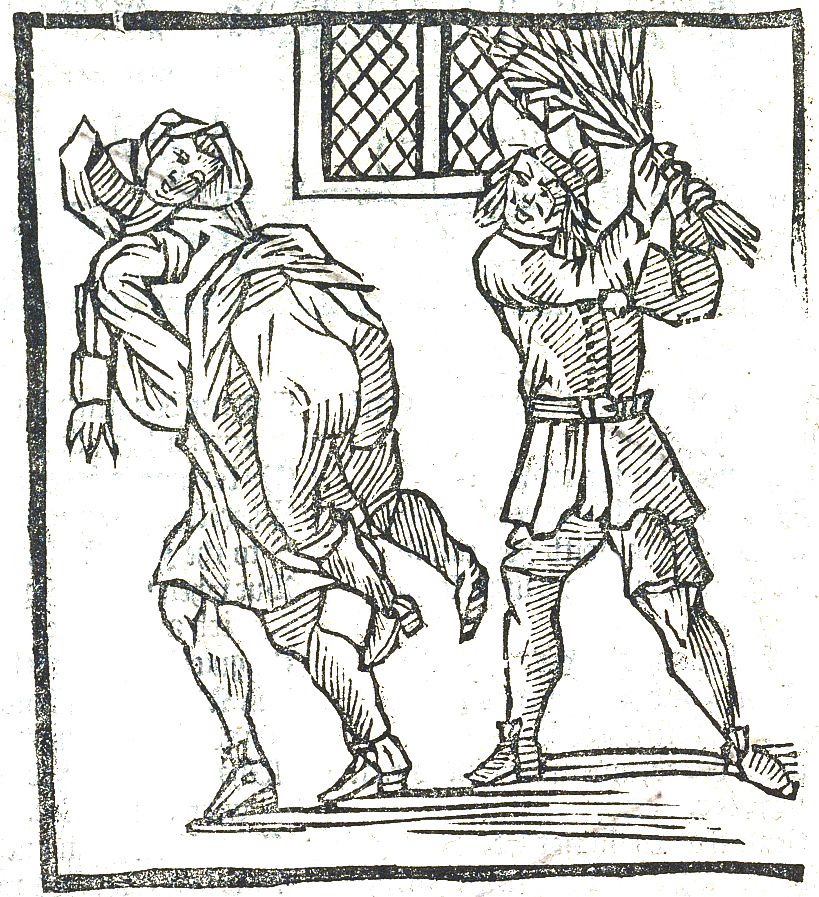
Whipping Tom, imagined in c. 1679

In 1681 an anonymously written short history of the events, "Whipping Tom Brought to Light, and Exposed to View", was published. This is available in the British Library along with several contemporary pamphlets and poems about the events. The work focuses on the lewd aspects of the story, and the academic David Savran classifies the work as one of the many pornographic pieces published during the Stuart Restoration. The broadsheet referred to "the generation of that Whipping Tom, that about nine years since proved such an enemy to the milk-wenches bums"; this likely refers to an attacker under the name "Whipping Tom" who had been operating in or around 1672, according to several sources. (Note: These include Malcolm Jones, a historian specialising in folklore and folklife; and the psychologist Robert Bartholomew and the philosopher Paul Weatherhead.)

== 1712 events ==
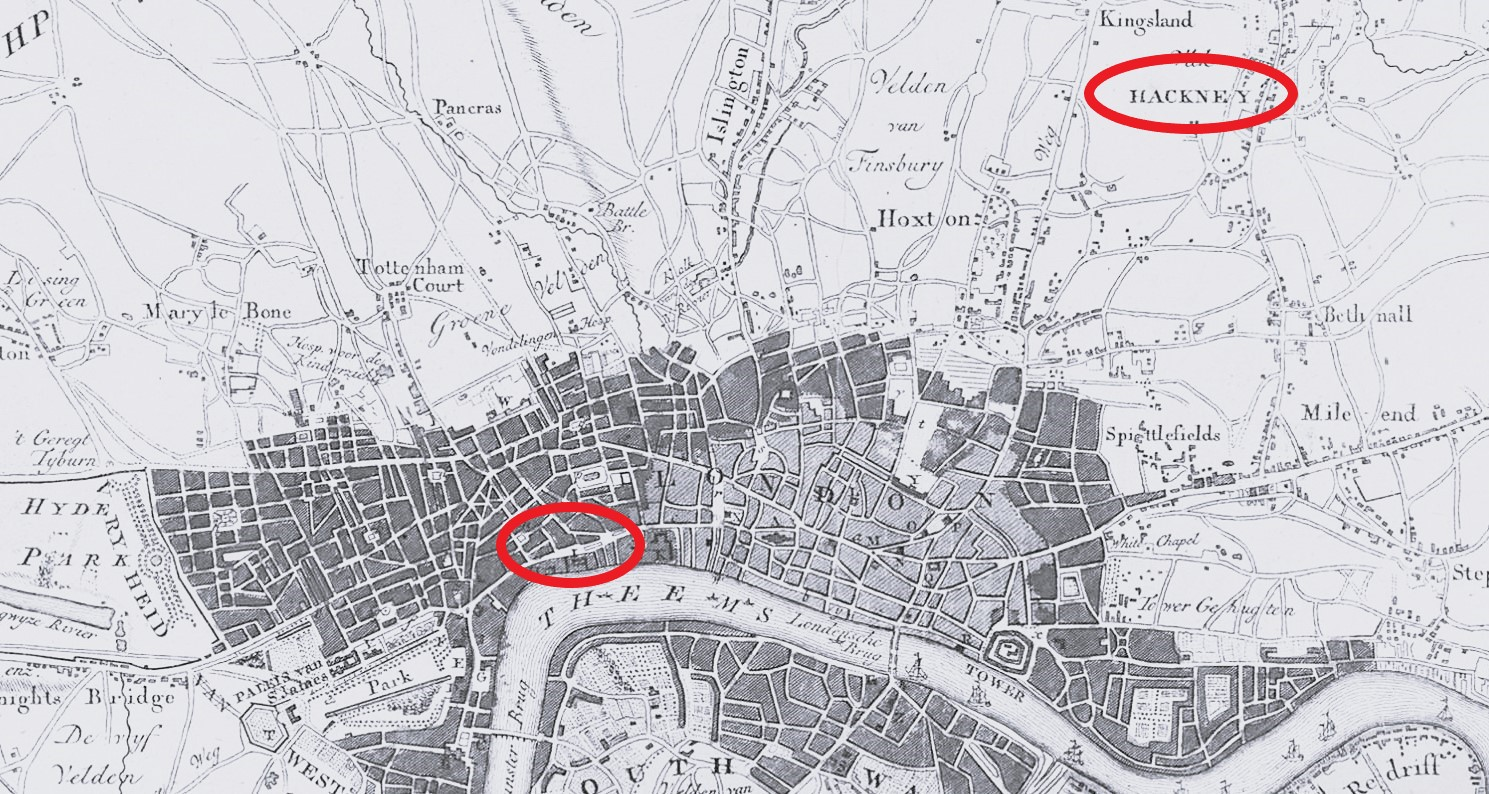
London and its environs, showing (circled in the city) the area in which the 1681 Whipping Tom was active; circled in the top right is where the Hackney Whipping Tom of 1712 was active

Between 10 October and 1 December 1712 a string of similar attacks took place in fields near Hackney, at that time a village three miles (4.8 km) northeast of London. A local man, Thomas Wallis, attacked lone women, raising their skirts and beating them "with a great rod of birch, that the blood ran down their tender bodies in a sad and dreadful manner". He was arrested after seventy women had been attacked; his indictment was composed of:

... three sheets of paper of very wicked actions, not only of taking up the women's coats and viewing their nakedness, and exposing many a pretty female's backside to the extremity of the wind and rainy weather; but even then in a violent and unmerciful way, lashed their tender buttocks, hips and thighs.

He pleaded not guilty and said that all women "deserved ten times more than either whip or rod could possibly afford them". Hamerton describes Wallis's explanation as "a form of misogynistic revenge" after Wallis said that he was "resolved to be revenged on all the women he could come at after that manner, for the sake of one perjured female, who had been barbarously false to him". He claimed that his plan was to attack a hundred women before Christmas Day, cease the attacks during the Twelve Days of Christmas, then resume the attacks in the New Year.

The report of Wallis's activities and trial are from "The Tryal, Examination and Conviction; of Thomas Wallis, Vulgarly Called Whipping Tom"; Toulalan identifies the document as "Humorous narrative ... combined with sexually explicit and titillating detail, providing both erotic and comic entertainment". As an example of this, Toulalan highlights the description of one attack:

Mary Sutten the milkmaid of Hackney also deposed that when the prisoner whipped her backside in a ditch near Shoulder of Mutton Fields, to prevent her crying out, he stuffed his handkerchief into her mouth, and would have thrust something else into another place, had not the watchmen come happily to her assistance.

The historian Lucy Inglis—while calling Wallis "a dangerous deviant"—identifies that his "attacks began with a spanking but soon evolved into serious sexual assault". He was found guilty and sentenced to imprisonment for one year at Bridewell Prison, where he was to be birched twice a week by two maids "till the blood on his back comes in six places". He was also to be stood in the pillory: once each at the Royal Exchange and Temple Bar and three times at St Margaret's Hill in Southwark. When he was released from prison, he was to run the gauntlet through "200 maids, wives and widows in Cheapside".

Hamerton considers that the reason Whipping Tom's history gained notoriety at a time when sexualised violence was common, was due to the "very deviance that provided the engaging factor". As examples, he cites the violent attacks in London that ended in 1712 by the gang known as the Mohocks, as well as the sexual assaults by Francis Charteris—nicknamed "The Rape-Master General"—and later serious attacks in 1761 by the group the Young Bloods and in the 1780s by Lascar seamen.

== Notes and references ==
=== Sources ===
==== Books ====
- Amussen, Susan Dwyer (1995). "'The Part of a Christian Man': The Cultural Politics of Manhood in Early Modern England". In Amussen, Susan Dwyer; Kishlansky, Mark A. (eds.). Political Culture and Cultural Politics in Early Modern Europe. Manchester: Manchester University Press. pp. 213–233. ISBN 978-0-7190-4695-7.
- Ashton, John (1968). Social Life in the Reign of Queen Anne. Vol. 2. Detroit, Michigan: Singing Tree Press. OCLC 2014249.
- Bartholomew, Robert E.; Weatherhead, Paul (2024). Social Panics & Phantom Attackers. Singapore: Palgrave Macmillan. doi:10.1007/978-981-97-4272-1. ISBN 978-9-8197-4271-4.
- Bondeson, Jan (2005). The London Monster. Stroud: Tempus Publishing. ISBN 978-0-7524-3327-1.
- Burg, Barry Richard (1995). Sodomy and the Pirate Tradition. New York: New York University Press. ISBN 978-0-8147-1073-9.
- Cawthorne, Nigel (2006). The Amorous Antics of Old England. London: Portrait. ISBN 978-0-7499-5100-9.
- Green, Jonathon (1998). The Cassell Dictionary of Slang. London: Cassell. ISBN 978-0-3043-4435-2.
- Hamerton, Christopher (2023). Devilry, Deviance and Public Sphere: The Social Discovery of Moral Panic in Eighteenth Century London. Cham: Palgrave Macmillan. doi:10.1007/978-3-031-14883-5. ISBN 978-3-0311-4882-8.
- Hirschfeld, Magnus (1935). Sexual Anomalies: The Origin, Nature and Treatment of Sexual Disorders. New York: Emerson. OCLC 1185732198.
- Jones, Malcolm (2010). The Print in Early Modern England: An Historical Oversight. New Haven, Connecticut: Yale University Press. ISBN 978-0-3001-3697-5.
- Loth, David (1931). Royal Charles: Ruler and Rake. London: G. Routledge & Sons. OCLC 15434360.
- Luttrell, Narcissus (1857). A Brief Historical Relation of State Affairs from September 1678 to April 1714. Vol. 1. Oxford: Oxford University Press. OCLC 1103563517.
- Newcourt, Richard (1708). Repertorium Ecclesiasticum Parochiale Londinense: An Ecclesiastical Parochial History of the Diocese of London. London: Benjamin Motte. OCLC 2666263.
- Savran, David (1998). Taking it Like a Man: White Masculinity, Masochism, and Contemporary American Culture. Princeton, New Jersey: Princeton University Press. ISBN 978-0-6910-5876-4.
- Shoemaker, Robert Brink (2004). The London Mob: Violence and Disorder in Eighteenth-Century England. London: Hambledon and London. ISBN 978-1-8528-5373-0.
- Toulalan, Sarah (2007). Imagining Sex: Pornography and Bodies in Seventeenth-Century England. Oxford: Oxford University Press. ISBN 978-0-1992-0914-9.

==== Pamphlets ====
- "The Tryal, Examination and Conviction; of Thomas Wallis, Vulgarly Called Whipping Tom". London: A Hawkins. 1740. OCLC 181833022.
- "Whipping Tom Brought to Light, and Exposed to View". London: Edward Brooks. 1681. OCLC 503996003.
- "Whipping Tom, or, The Deceitfull Kinsman". London: F. Cole, T. Vere, J. Wright, F Clark, W Thackery and T. Passenger. c. 1679. OCLC 798386886.
- "Whipping-Tom Turn'd Citizen: or, The Crack's Terror". London: P. Brooksby. 1684. OCLC 180713796.

==== Websites ====
- Inglis, Lucy (5 November 2009). "Whipping Tom, The Crack's Terror". Georgian London. Archived from the original on 3 May 2017.
