= Clive Wallis =

Irish rugby union player

Clive Wallis MC
- Full name: Clive O'Neill Wallis
- Born: 16 October 1913 Dublin, Ireland
- Died: 26 October 1981 (aged 68)

Rugby union career
- Position: Prop
International career
Years	Team	Apps	(Points)
1935	Ireland	1	(0)

Clive O'Neill Wallis (16 October 1913 — 26 October 1981) was an Irish international rugby union player.

Born in Dublin, Wallis was a nephew of Ireland three-quarter Thomas Wallis. He attended Cranleigh School in England and remained in the country for his later rugby, playing with the British Army. In 1935, Wallis was capped as a forward for Ireland in a match against the touring All Blacks at Lansdowne Road in his hometown Dublin.

Wallis received a commission to the East Surrey Regiment and in 1938 got posted with the 2nd Battalion to Singapore. He served as a company commander during the Malayan Campaign and was held for over three years as a prisoner of war by the Japanese, later receiving a Military Cross for his leadership while in captivity.

== See also ==
- List of Ireland national rugby union players
