= Offstage Theatre =

- Address: Charlottesville, Virginia; United States of America
- Type: site-specific theatre

Construction
- Opened: 1989

Website
- offstagetheatre.org

Offstage Theatre produces site-specific one-acts and short plays and stages them in the locations—bars, museums, shops—for which they were written. Founded in Charlottesville, VA in 1988-89 by Doug Grissom, associate professor and Head of Playwriting at University of Virginia, playwrights Mark Serrill and Tom Coash, with John Quinn as its first Resident Director, the company remains committed primarily to producing new work in non-theatrical spaces, with a few exceptions.

In 1993, then-Artistic Director John Quinn began producing Offstage's plays in Boston and Cambridge, Massachusetts, and at the Edinburgh Fringe Festival. Joel Jones took Offstage to NYC in 2005. Offstage is most well known for its Barhoppers series performed in Charlottesville area restaurants, its Pub Crawl in Boston/Cambridge area pubs, and an educational touring program ("But I Said No") addressing acquaintance rape that has received national acclaim.

== Playwrights, directors and performers ==
Offstage has performed several world premieres, and draws heavily, though not exclusively from local Virginia and University of Virginia playwrighting talents, including works from Edward Albee, Margaret Baldwin, Samuel Beckett, Eric Bogosian, Tom Coash, Lila Fenton Heasley, Matthew Farrell, Tina Fey, Scott Fishel, Doug Grissom, Elizabeth Harris, David Ives, Joel Jones, Franz Xaver Kroetz, Sandy McAdams, Aidan Parkinson, John Quinn, Laura Quinn, William Rough, Mark Serrill, Aaron Sorkin, Barney Strauss, Jr., Lucinda McDermott, among others.

Directors have included Tom Coash, Elizabeth Harris, Joel Jones, Cristan Keighley, Chris Patrick, Carol Pedersen, John Quinn, Mark Serrill, Tricia Sexton, Jacquie Patteson, Mendy St. Ours, Denise Stewart, and Betsy Rudelich Tucker among others.

Notable performers in Offstage Theatre works have included Cate Andrews, Phillip Beard, Bambi Chapin, John Wentworth Chapin, Richard Gilman, Lila Fenton Heasley, Scott Fishel, Ben Jones, Cristan Keighley, Jenifer Marshall, Dave Matthews, Thadd McQuade, Beatrice Ost, Chris Patrick, Brooke Plotnick, Sian Richards, Stuart Ross, William Rough, Pamela Rogers Schnatterly, John Schnatterly, Steve Tharp, Mark Valahovic, Jacquie Patteson, Richard Warner, David Wellbeloved and many others.

== Performance history ==
Year	Production	Cast and crew	Performance venue
1989	Chug, written by Ken Jenkins	directed by Tom Coash; John Quinn(Chug)	Coash's Cabin, Albemarle County
1989	The Zoo Story, written by Edward Albee	directed by Mark Serrill; John Quinn ( Jerry), John Wentworth Chapin (Peter)	Lee Park, Charlottesville, Virginia
1990	Barhoppers I		Millers Restaurant, Fat City Diner, and Eastern Standard Restaurant, Charlottesville, Virginia
	Ringing the Bell, written by Tom Coash	directed by John Quinn; John Wentworth Chapin (Chug), Pat Daly (Julie), Connie Sanders (Sarah)	
	An End the World Pass, written by Mark Serrill	directed by Mark Serrill; Margaret Baldwin (Megan), Dave Matthews (Harry), John Schnatterly (Jim)	
	Welcome to the Moon, written by John Patrick Shanley	directed by John Quinn; John Wentworth Chapin (Vinnie), Dave Matthews (Ronnie), John Schnatterly (Stephen), John Quinn (Artie), Yael Ksander (Shirley)	
1990	Krapp's Last Tape, written by Samuel Beckett	directed by John Quinn; Mark Serrill (Krapp), Joel Jones (sound)	Purcell Rug Company, Charlottesville, Virginia
1990	Chocolate Cake, written by Mary Gallagher	directed by Tom Coash; Bambi Dean (Joellen Fitzer), Pam Loftin (Delia Baron), Lew Stokes (Voice of Ted), Victoria Moore (Voice of Polly), Robert Harllee (Voice of Spuds)	Miller's Restaurant, Charlottesville, Virginia
1990	The Actor's Nightmare, written by Christopher Durang	Karen Schnatterly (Meg, The Stage Manager), John Quinn (George Spelvin), Joel Jones (Executioner and Announcer), Vanessa (Ellen), Kyly Sicher (Sarah), Richard (Ned) Needham (Henry)	Eastern Standard Restaurant, Charlottesville, Virginia
1990	Save the Paramount Series		Under the marquee of the Paramount Theater, Charlottesville, Virginia
	?, written by Tom Coash	directed by Mark McLaughlin; Burt Creasy (Lazarus Lee), Margaret Baldwin (Ginny)	
	In the Heat, written by Doug Grissom	directed by Doug Grissom; Tracey Howell (Zelda), Margaret Baldwin (Ellie), Pam Loftin (Hanna), Dave Matthews (Quinton), John Quinn (Pablo)	
1990	Famous for 15 Minutes Series		Tandem School, Charlottesville, Virginia
	A Pre-Matrimonial Conversation, written by Mark Jensen	directed by Colleen Kelly; Bambi Chapin (She), John Wentworth Chapin (He)	
	Four-Thirty, written by Katie Griesar	directed by Tom Coash; Dean Cameron (Walt), Dan Mueller (Levon)	
	Intensity, written by Tom Coash	directed by William Rough; Sean Bather (Ishmael), Bert Creasy (Coach)	
	Man Under, written by Collette Burson	directed by Margaret Baldwin; Joyce Sparagdis (Harriet), Betsy Stalkner (Myrtle)	
	Contact, written by Doug Grissom	directed by Doug Grissom	Richard Warner (Man), Tricia Sexton (Voice)
	The Kindness of Strangers, written by Jack Turner	directed by Victoria Moore; Cate Andrews (Ann), Ben Boyar (Bill), Christian Breedan (Punk), Kathy Compton (Punkette)	
	Just Say No, written by Barney Strauss, Jr.	directed by John Quinn; Tony Donelson (Bart), Thomas Doran (Matthew), Pam Lofton (Micki), Dave Matthews (Joel), Kyly Sicher (Skippy)	
1990	‘But I Said No’ Tour, written by Margaret Baldwin and Doug Grissom	directed by Richard Warner; Margaret Baldwin, Bambi Chapin, John Wentworth Chapin, Jean Collins, Pam Loftin	university campuses
1991	The Library Series		the Pink Building, Charlottesville, Virginia
1991	The Art Gallery Series		the Pink Building, Charlottesville, Virginia
1997	Foolery's Cyrano	Thadd McQuade, John Harrell, Kara McLane and Martha Mendenhall	Edinburgh Fringe Festival, Venue 40, The Quaker House
2013	Barhoppers 2013 (co-production with Live Arts)	produced by Tracie Skipper	Rapture, Milli Joe, and The Local, Charlottesville, Virginia

== Production venues ==
Charlottesville, Virginia	Boston / Cambridge, Massachusetts	New York / Brooklyn, New York
Millers Restaurant, Eastern Standard Restaurant, Escafe, the Downtown Mall, Tandem School, Estouteville Farm, the Pink Building, Live Arts Theatre, Rapture, Frank Ix Building, University of Virginia	An Tua Nua, the Black Rose, the Burren, Charlestown Working Theatre, Clery's/The Claddagh, Mr. Dooley's, Doyle's Pub, the Druid, Emerson College, the Field, Finnegan's Wake, the Harp, James's Gate, the Kells, Kinvara Pub, Ned Kelly's; Phoenix Landing, the Plough and Stars, Tir Na Nóg	Brooklyn

== Artistic directors ==
Tom Coash
Doug Grissom
Mark Serrill
John Quinn
Joel Jones
Larry Emmons
Jeff Kitchen
Tim Van Dyck & Denise Stewart (co-artistic directors)
Chris Patrick
Bree Luck
