= Priscilla Gilman =

American writer and former college professor

- Born: May 1, 1970 (age 56); New York City, New York, United States
- Education: Yale University
- Writing career
- Period: 2011-present
- Genre: Non-fiction
- Notable work: The Anti-Romantic Child: A Story of Unexpected Joy

Priscilla Gilman (born May 1, 1970) is an American writer and former college professor. She has written about literature, parenting, education, and autism for numerous publications, and is an advocate for autistic people and children. She is the author of The Anti-Romantic Child: A Story of Unexpected Joy, which was inspired by her autistic son Benjamin.

== Biography ==
Priscilla Gilman was born and raised in New York City. Her mother is the literary agent Lynn Nesbit, her father the Yale Drama School professor, author, and critic Richard Gilman. She attended The Brearley School from first through twelfth grade, and earned a B.A. summa cum laude and with exceptional distinction from Yale University, where she majored in English, in 1993. She also did her master's degree and PhD in English and American literature at Yale. Gilman was an assistant professor of English at Yale for two years and an assistant professor of English at Vassar College for four years before leaving academia in 2006. From 2006 to 2011, she worked as a literary agent at Janklow & Nesbit Associates.

Raising Benjamin has inspired Priscilla to raise awareness of autism. In 2011, she published her first book, The Anti-Romantic Child: A Story of Unexpected Joy, which was written about him and the romantic poetry she had studied, written about, and taught. The Anti-Romantic Child was excerpted in Newsweek magazine and featured on the cover of its international edition. It was an NPR Morning Edition Must-Read, Slate‘s Book of the Week, selected as one of the Best Books of 2011 by the Leonard Lopate Show, and chosen as a Best Book of 2011 by The Chicago Tribune. One of five nominees for a Books for a Better Life Award for Best First Book, The Anti-Romantic Child was also awarded the Mom’s Choice Gold Award. It was published in Brazil as O Filho Antirromantico by Companhia das Letras.

Since the publication of The Anti-Romantic Child, Gilman has written numerous articles and book reviews for publications including the Daily Beast, The New York Times Book Review, The New York Times’ Motherlode, the Boston Globe, DuJour magazine, The Chicago Tribune, MORE, O: The Oprah Magazine, Real Simple, Redbook, and Huff Post Parents. Her December 2012 New York Times op-ed, “Don’t Blame Autism for Newtown,” was the most emailed article on the site for several days after its publication. Her August 25, 2013 New York Times Book Review Back Page Essay, “Early Reader,” was also widely shared.

Gilman is the parenting/education advice columnist for #1 best-selling author Susan Cain's Quiet Revolution website. Her son is skilled in classical guitar, and Priscilla and Benjamin have recorded a holiday CD, which was released for Christmas 2016.

== Works ==
- The Anti-Romantic Child. HarperCollins. 19 April 2011. ISBN 978-0-06-169027-3.
- The Critic's Daughter. W. W. Norton. 7 February 2023. ISBN 978-0-393-65132-4.
