= It's My Turn (film) =

1980 film by Claudia Weill

- Theatrical release poster
- Directed by: Claudia Weill
- Written by: Eleanor Bergstein
- Produced by: Martin Elfand
- Starring: Jill Clayburgh; Michael Douglas; Charles Grodin
- Cinematography: Bill Butler
- Edited by: Byron "Buzz" Brandt; James Coblentz; Marjorie Fowler; David Bretherton
- Music by: Patrick Williams
- Production company: Rastar
- Distributed by: Columbia Pictures
- Release date: October 24, 1980
- Running time: 91 minutes
- Country: United States
- Language: English
- Box office: $11 million

It's My Turn is a 1980 American romantic comedy-drama film starring Jill Clayburgh, Michael Douglas, and Charles Grodin.

The film was directed by Claudia Weill and written by Eleanor Bergstein, and received mostly negative reviews from film critics, resulting in a Golden Raspberry Award for Worst Screenplay nomination.

== Plot ==
Kate Gunzinger is a mathematics professor at a Chicago university. She lives with divorcé Homer, in a comfortable but not terribly passionate relationship.

Kate travels to New York for a job interview and to attend the wedding of her widowed father Jacob. She is offered the job, though it does not look promising, as she will not be able to continue doing research. She meets the bride Emma Lewin's son, Ben, a former professional baseball player.

Ben is married, but a relationship develops with Kate. He takes her to Yankee Stadium for an old-timers' game, and after the game they sleep together. Kate goes back to Chicago and breaks up with Homer. She returns to work, where she is greeted with a gift sent by Ben.

== Cast ==
- Jill Clayburgh as Kate Gunzinger
- Michael Douglas as Ben Lewin
- Charles Grodin as Homer
- Beverly Garland as Emma
- Steven Hill as Jacob
- Teresa Baxter as Maryanne
- Joan Copeland as Rita
- Charles Kimbrough as Jerome
- Roger Robinson as Flicker
- Jennifer Salt as Maisie
- Daniel Stern as Cooperman
- Dianne Wiest as Gail (credited as Diane Wiest)

== Production ==
The film's title track, "It's My Turn", played during the final credits, was sung by Diana Ross, with music by Michael Masser and lyrics by Carole Bayer Sager. The song reached No. 9 on the Billboard Hot 100 chart.

The film had a tumultuous production due to conflict between Claudia Weill and producer Ray Stark. After Stark's death, Weill said he "was a real bully, and so it was a difficult situation.” Weill claimed Stark would undermine her authority in front of the crew, and overly-scrutinize her work. Later she found out that while editing the movie, Stark had hired a shadow editor to cut a different version of the film. Due to the overall experience, she directed no more films outside of television.

== Critical reception ==
On the review aggregator website Rotten Tomatoes, 29% of 7 critics' reviews are positive, with an average rating of 5.4/10. Roger Ebert of the Chicago Sun-Times gave the film 2 stars out of 4, writing that:

It's My Turn is one of those movies where you can almost keep a mental list of the important topics as they're ticked off in the dialogue. The people in this movie don't seem to be having conversations; they seem to be marching through current feminist issues.

The film was nominated for a Golden Raspberry Award for Worst Screenplay for Eleanor Bergstein at the 1st Golden Raspberry Awards.

David Nusair of Reel Film Reviews gave a mildly positive review writing, "It’s agreeably familiar subject matter that’s employed to basically watchable yet relentlessly uneven effect by Weill, as the filmmaker, armed with a script by Eleanor Bergstein, delivers an erratically-paced endeavor that’s rarely, if ever, as peppy or lighthearted as its opening stretch might’ve indicated..."

== See also ==
- List of films about mathematicians
