= Vinson Cunningham =

American critic and novelist

- Born: 1984 (age 41–42)
- Spouse: Renée Chung (m. 2018; died 2023)
- Children: 2
- Writing career
- Genres: Criticism; Literary Fiction
- Subjects: Sports; Theater; Television
- Notable awards: George Jean Nathan Award for Dramatic Criticism (2021–2022); Pulitzer Prize for Criticism, Finalist (2024, 2025, and 2026)

Vinson Cunningham (born c. 1984) is an American critic and novelist who has written for The New Yorker magazine since 2016. He has thrice been a finalist for the Pulitzer Prize for Criticism.

== Early life and education ==
Cunningham grew up in New York City. As a child, he was part of the Prep for Prep program, which helped place him at the Horace Mann School, where he graduated in 2002. Cunningham attended Middlebury College, but left for academic reasons in his sophomore year. After a probationary term of study at Hunter College, Cunningham returned to Middlebury, but left to join the workforce shortly after he learned he would become a father. He later finished his bachelor's degree in English at Hunter in 2014.

Cunningham joined Barack Obama's presidential campaign in March 2007 as a staff assistant, where he worked through the 2008 election. He spoke about his role on The New Yorker Radio Hour:

"I was calling people, asking for checks. A lot of fundraising on political campaigns then and now happens at fundraising events. You go to some rich person's apartment and they invite their friends. [...] I would be at the front collecting checks and writing down names or things like that. I was the lowest level person in that."

After Obama won, Cunningham served in the Presidential Personnel Office as an Economics Staff Assistant, where, as of 2011, he received one of the lowest annual salaries in the White House.

== Writing career ==
While working at NYCHA and the Rockefeller Foundation as a speech writer, Cunningham started writing freelance theater and book reviews for The Brooklyn Paper and Nylon magazine. In 2014, Cunnigham entered and won a contest by McSweeney's to create his own column. He continued to write the column, entitled "Field Notes from Gentrified Places," throughout 2015 as his career "started to pick up."

In 2016, Cunningham began at The New Yorker as a staff writer. He writes frequently about sports, including about the relationship between Lebron James and Kyrie Irving and his own Knicks fandom. In 2019, Cunningham interviewed Tracy Morgan shortly after he was in a near-fatal car accident. The piece was a finalist for the National Magazine Award for Profile Writing.

In June 2019, Cunningham and fellow staff writer Alexandra Schwartz became co-chief theater critics for The New Yorker, succeeding Hilton Als. Cunningham received the 2021-2022 George Jean Nathan Award for Dramatic Criticism for his theater reviews, with the committee specifically citing his July 2021 essay on Aleshea Harris's multi-genre play What to Send Up When It Goes Down.

Cunningham has been a member of the New York Drama Critics' Circle. He also served as a judge for the 2022 PEN America Literary Awards.

In 2024, Cunningham was a finalist for the Pulitzer Prize for Criticism for his "formidable knowledge of the stage and the mechanics of performance along with canny observations on the human condition." His nominated works included reviews of The Comeuppance, New York, New York versus Good Night, Oscar, and Leslie Odom Jr.'s revival of Purlie Victorious.

He was again a finalist for the award in 2025, for "illuminating and personal reviews of work that appears on television, streaming services or social media, trenchant criticism that explores contemporary issues and society." His nominated works include reviews of Jaleel White's memoir Growing Up Urkel and Nicole Kidman's The Perfect Couple, as well as essays on campaign advertising in the 2024 American presidential election and Pat McAfee.

Cunningham was a finalist for the criticism prize a third time, in 2026, "for sophisticated, accessible essays on the media, with an emphasis on television". The Pulitzer committee cited his essays for The New Yorker, on topics including Pope Francis, the New York Post, and Malcolm-Jamal Warner.

Cunningham has co-hosted The New Yorker podcast "Critics at Large" with Naomi Fry and Alexandra Schwartz since October 2023. In 2024, an article in The New York Times cited "Critics at Large" as an exemplar of the growing trend of successful "chat podcasts."

=== Great Expectations (2024) ===
Cunningham published his debut novel on March 12, 2024. The book follows a young campaign aide to a presidential candidate (named only as "The Senator" or "The Candidate") based on Barack Obama. The semi-autobiographical narrative follows the protagonist David Hammond over the course of year, engaging in topics like "the social lexicon of intra-racial hierarchy," politics, Christianity, class, and Hammond's sex life. Cunningham based the novel on his own experience working on Obama's first campaign. Cunningham credited the title to Emily Nussbaum, who suggested it as an homage to Charles Dickens's novel.

For The Washington Post, Ron Charles wrote that the book "captured the soul of America." The Atlantic magazine reviewer Danielle Amir Jackson likewise concluded that it marked "a keen look back at the failed promise" of the early Obama administration.

Alternatively, Ruth Margalit argued in The New York Review of Books that "one of the great pleasures of reading Cunningham is his behind-the-scenes account not of the Obama campaign [...] but of a critical mind being formed." Margalit compared the book more to autofiction works by critics Elif Batuman and Ben Lerner than political chronicles like The World As It Is by Ben Rhodes.

Great Expectations was listed as one of 100 Notable books of 2024 by The New York Times. The novel was also a finalist for the National Book Critics Circle award for "best first book" and was named to the longlist for the award for best fiction.

== Personal life ==
Cunningham married Renée M. Chung in New York City in 2018. They were wed at New York City Hall, which Cunningham and Chung spoke about for The New Yorker Radio Hour. Chung died in February 2023. He dedicated his 2024 novel Great Expectations to her memory.

Cunningham has two daughters. The first was born in 2005, shortly after he left Middlebury. His second child was born in late 2024.
