= James Goodwin (actor) =

American actor (born 1961)

- Born: July 24, 1961 (age 65); Biloxi, Mississippi, U.S.
- Other name: Jamie Goodwin
- Education: Oklahoma State University; Southern Methodist University
- Occupation: Actor
- Years active: 1986–present
- Spouse: Michelle Goodwin (m. 1985)
- Children: 2

James "Jamie" Goodwin (born July 24, 1961) is an American actor. He is best known for playing the roles of Johnny Bauer on the CBS soap opera Guiding Light (1986 to 1990) and Kevin Anderson on the NBC soap opera Another World (1991 to 1993).

== Early life ==
Goodwin was born in Biloxi, Mississippi. His father was a lieutenant colonel in the U.S. Air Force. He has a brother and four sisters. The family moved five times before settling in Waukomis, Oklahoma. Goodwin grew up working on the family farm, learning to drive a tractor by the time he was eight years old. When he was in high school, he was a charter member of the Future Farmers of America and owned sixty sheep.

Goodwin appeared in numerous local plays and he was also a member of a singing group. His father discouraged him from having a theatrical career. After Goodwin's parents divorced when he was fifteen, he felt free to focus on acting. He studied drama at Oklahoma State University, receiving a bachelor of arts degree. He then earned a master of fine arts degree at Southern Methodist University in Dallas, Texas.

== Career ==
During college, Goodwin had roles in stage productions of The Glass Menagerie and The Pirates of Penzance. He appeared in a television commercial for Pabst Blue Ribbon and had a small role on Dallas. After graduation, Goodwin was one of ten students flown to New York for auditions. He was cast as Johnny Bauer on the CBS soap opera Guiding Light. He began airing on the show in June 1986.

In 1987, Goodwin played Valentine in Two Gentlemen of Verona at the Delacorte Theater, co-starring with Thomas Gibson and Elizabeth McGovern. In 1988, he played Marullus in Julius Caesar at The Public Theater, co-starring with Al Pacino and Martin Sheen.

Goodwin was dismissed from his role on Guiding Light, last airing May 16, 1990. He joined the cast of the NBC soap opera Another World, playing Kevin Anderson from 1991 to 1993.

Goodwin played Bud in the 1995 film Let it Be Me. From 1998 to 1999, he had a recurring role as James on Sex and the City, a boyfriend who was dumped by Samantha Jones for having a small penis. He also guest starred on Ed, Hack, and Law & Order. Goodwin played Nick Roberts in the 2001 film Serendipity.

In 2007, he starred in Noël Coward's Present Laughter at the Zachary Scott Theatre Center in Austin, Texas. He has since performed in other productions at the same venue, including Into the Woods and Sunday in the Park with George.

== Personal life ==
Goodwin married his wife, Michelle, after they graduated from college. They have two sons.

== Filmography ==
=== Film ===
Year	Title	Role	Notes
1995	Let It Be Me	Bud	
2001	Serendipity	Nick Roberts	
2002	Crazy Little Thing	Man No.1	Also titled The Perfect You Credited as Jamie Goodwin

=== Television ===
Year	Title	Role	Notes
1986–1990	Guiding Light	Johnny Bauer	Contract role
1990	Jim Henson's Mother Goose Stories	Tom	
1991–1993	Another World	Kevin Anderson	Contract role
1998–1999	Sex and the City	James	3 episodes
1999	Third Watch	Rick Johnson	Episode: "Impulse" Credited as Jamie Goodwin
1999	All My Children	Jerry Reeves	Recurring role
2001	Law & Order: Special Victims Unit	Danny Marston	Episode: "Care" Credited as Jamie Goodwin
2001	Ed	Dr. Kendall	Episode: "Mind Over Matter" Credited as Jamie Goodwin
2003	Law & Order	George Ashman	Episode: "Chosen" Credited as Jamie Goodwin
2003	Hack	Doug Fulton	Episode: "Death of Innocence" Credited as Jamie Goodwin
