= Maya Phillips =

American critic and poet (born 1990)

Maya Phillips (born July 27, 1990) is an American journalist and poet. She has been the arts critic at large for The New York Times since 2021. Phillips received the 2021-22 George Jean Nathan Award for Dramatic Criticism. She also wrote the poetry collection Erou (2019) and the essay collection Nerd (2022).

== Life and career ==
Phillips was born on July 27, 1990. She was raised in New York. Phillips received a bachelor's degree from Emerson College and a master of fine arts from Warren Wilson College. She wrote freelance about theater for various outlets, including New York Amsterdam News and The New York Times.

In June 2020, Phillips became an arts fellow at The New York Times, later receiving a permanent appointment as the newspaper's critic at large. In this role, she writes about theater especially, but also other cultural topics, especially "fandom and nerd culture." In 2022, she received the 2020-2021 George Jean Nathan Award for Dramatic Criticism. The committee especially cited her reviews of the James Ijames play The Most Spectacularly Lamentable Trial of Miz Martha Washington and Claudia Rankine's play November.

=== Erou (2019) ===
Phillips released the poetry collection Erou in 2019, published by Four Way Books. In a review, Stephanie Burt noted that the collection focused on the death of a complicated father using repeated allegories to Greek mythology. Burt favorably compared the "stark tableaus" and mythological angle to the work of Louise Gluck. A starred review from Publishers Weekly described Erou as "a modern epic poem that blends urban decadence with transcendental pathos". The book was a finalist for the 2020 PEN Open Book Award.

In an essay, Phillips wrote that the title character Erou—taken from the Romanian word for "hero"—was meant to represent her departed father, imagined as a version of Odysseus. Phillips reflected that:

My father felt oblique to me, impenetrable, no less so after his death, so I molded his absence into the shape of the heroes I knew. [. . .] I wrote my father into a hero and his story as an epic not to soften the edges of the tragedy but to make it all worthwhile.

=== Nerd (2022) ===
In 2022, Phillips released the essay collection Nerd: Adventures in Fandom from This Universe to the Multiverse, published by Atria. The book primarily focuses on her influences growing up in the 1990s, including superhero cartoons, anime, and teen horror. Publishers Weekly wrote in a non-starred review that the book's "sparkling essays demolish the boundaries between high and low art." Among the topics discussed are Sailor Moon, The Boondocks, Buffy the Vampire Slayer, Black Leopard, Red Wolf, and Black Panther.
