= Thomas Wallis (rugby union) =

Irish rugby union player

- Full name: Thomas Gill Wallis
- Born: 2 October 1898 Rathdown, Dublin, Ireland
- Died: 31 October 2000 (aged 102)

Rugby union career
- Position: Three-quarter
International career
Years	Team	Apps	(Points)
1921–22	Ireland	5	(14)

Thomas Gill Wallis (2 October 1898 — 31 October 2000) was an Irish international rugby union player.

Born in Rathdown, Co. Dublin, Wallis was a son of noted horse breeder C. T. Wallis and a brother of tennis player Hilda Wallis, who competed at Wimbledon. His uncles Arthur and William Wallis were both Ireland rugby internationals.

Wallis, a three-quarter, played for Dublin club Wanderers and was capped five times for Ireland, as a centre on debut in 1921, then on a wing for his four appearances the following year. He scored his only Ireland try against England at Lansdowne Road in 1922 and in his next match played opposite the famous sprinter Eric Liddell.

In addition to rugby union, Wallis was a four-time national champion in the 120 yard hurdles. He was also a singer and won a gold medal at the Feis Ceoil, an annual singing festival.

Wallis had a nephew, Clive, who played as a prop for Ireland in the 1930s.

== See also ==
- List of Ireland national rugby union players
