= Charles McNulty =

American journalist

- Born: 1966 (age 59–60); United States
- Occupations: Theatre critic, writer

Charles McNulty (born 1966) is the chief theatre critic for the Los Angeles Times newspaper and a recipient of Cornell University's prestigious Nathan Award for dramatic criticism, who, himself, served as chairman of the Pulitzer Prize drama jury. McNulty was engaged in the year 2005 as the Times newspaper's chief theater critic after an exhaustive 4-year search.

McNulty was previously a theater critic and editor for The Village Voice newspaper, where he also chaired the newspapers Obie Award panel. He obtained his doctorate in dramaturgy and drama criticism from the Yale School of Drama. He has taught at Yale, NYU, the New School of Social Research, UCLA and CUNY. He was head of the Masters of Fine Arts program in dramaturgy at Brooklyn College.

He received the 2009-2010 George Jean Nathan Award for Dramatic Criticism.
