= 3Views =

Theater criticism website

3Views on Theater
- Type: Theater criticism website
- Founder(s): Julia Jordan and Sarah Ruhl
- Editor: Brittani Samuel and Emily Chackerian
- Founded: May 2020
- Language: English
- Website: 3viewstheater.com

3Views, also 3Views on Theater, is a digital outlet that publishes theater criticism. The website was founded in 2020 by Sarah Ruhl and Julia Jordanas a project of The Lillys. The two playwrights sought to create a place for discussing theater that circumvented The New York Times and other establishment outlets. In a contrast to mainstream critics, 3Views assigns three critics to write about the same productions, offering their differing perspectives.

== History ==
The Lillys, which is an advocacy group founded in 2010 for women in theater, sought to create an alternative critical outlet for multiple years. In 2018, the organization announced the project in abstract terms, later creating a Kickstarter aiming for $50,000 in seed funding. By July 2019, the outlet also advertised its supporters and funders from within the industry—called the Founders Circle—which included Danai Gurira, David Henry Hwang, Branden Jacobs-Jenkins, Lynn Nottage, Robert Schenkkan, and Paula Vogel, among others. Lillys executive director Julia Jordan and playwright Sarah Ruhl are the website's formal co-founders.

Ruhl and Jordan took inspiration from the format of The New York Review of Books, which sometimes features longform debates between critics. The premise of 3Views would involve 3 different critics writing about a single production, offering multiple perspectives, in contrast to mainstream publications where a single critic would review most major performances. Ruhl also cited the Wallace Stevens poem "Thirteen Ways of Looking at a Blackbird" as foundational to the project. Besides the broadening of viewpoints, the website also stemmed from a frustration over the outsized power of existing critics and a desire to draw from more female and non-white critics. In 2019, Jordan described the potential value of 3Views:

I think that just by having more voices out there that are actually being listened to, it might change the behavior of the marketplace. Right now, a fearful producer may be like, "The Times said no," even if that wasn’t the intention of Jesse Green, you know what I mean? [. . .] By adding more multiplicity and diversity, we will be changing the landscape.

The site launched during the COVID-19 pandemic, which had cancelled all Broadway and off-Broadway live theater. During the closures, 3Views published reflective essays from theater figures and articles "mourning" productions cancelled during the pandemic. Director Melissa Crespo served as editor for this period. In October 2021, the site reoriented back to the original mission of providing multiple critical perspectives on individual productions. To that end, it established Brittani Samuel, Jose Solís, and Sarah Rose Leonard as its three co-editors. In February 2025, the organization received a special citation (the Michael Feingold Award) from the Obie Awards. As of 2026, its co-editors are Samuel and Emily Chackerian.
