= Bert O. States =

American dramatist

Bert Olen States (August 8, 1929 in Punxsutawney, Pennsylvania – October 13, 2003 in Santa Barbara) was a playwright, critic and a professor emeritus of dramatic arts at the University of California, Santa Barbara. He was known mostly for his books and articles on literary and dramatic theory and on dreams.

He earned a B.A (1950) and M.A. (1955) from Penn State University. He went on to study at Yale University, earning in 1960 a Doctorate in Fine Arts. He taught at the Rensselaer Polytechnic Institute (1959–60), Skidmore College (1960–64) and at the University of Pittsburgh (1964–67). He was an associate and full professor at Cornell University (1967–78) and a professor at the department of Dramatic Art at University of California, Santa Barbara, from which he retired in 1994.

He was the Associate Editor for Theatre Journal and Journal of Dramatic Theory and Criticism.

In the early 1950s while when in military service, he wrote scripts for documentaries for the Armed Forces Radio Service.

== Books ==
- Irony and Drama: A Poetics. Ithaca, NY: Cornell UP, 1971.
- The Shape of Paradox: An Essay on ‘Waiting for Godot.’ Berkeley: U of California P, 1978.
- Great Reckonings in Little Rooms: On the Phenomenology of Theatre. Berkeley: U of California P, 1985.
- The Rhetoric of Dreams. Ithaca, NY: Cornell UP, 1988.
- ‘Hamlet’ and the Concept of Character. Baltimore: Johns Hopkins UP, 1992.
- Dreaming and Storytelling. Ithaca, NY: Cornell UP, 1993.
- The Pleasure of the Play. Ithaca, NY: Cornell UP, 1994.
- Seeing in the Dark: Reflections on Dreams and Dreaming. New Haven, CT: Yale UP, 1997.

== Plays ==
- The Tall Grass, 1954
- A Rent in the Universe, 1967.
- Ralph, 1975.
- The Mind of a Dreamer, 1983
