= Laurence Senelick =

American educator

- Born: October 12, 1942 (age 83); Chicago, Illinois, U.S.
- Education: Northwestern University (B.A.). Harvard University (A.M. Ph.D.)
- Occupations: Educator, scholar, actor, translator, theater director
- Partner: Michael McDowell (1969-1999)
- Awards: Barnard Hewitt Award, George Freedley Award, George J. Nathan Award, Oscar Brockett Outstanding Teacher of Theatre in Higher Education, Betty Jean Jones Award of the American Theatre and Drama Society.

Laurence Senelick (born October 12, 1942) is an American scholar, educator, actor and director. He is the author, editor, or translator of many books.

== Teaching ==
Senelick joined the Department of Drama at Tufts University in 1972, where he was later named Fletcher Professor of Oratory and served as Director of Graduate Studies for 30 years. He retired in 2019.

== Scholarship ==
Senelick's scholarship has focused on popular entertainment, with research into music hall, vaudeville, circus and pantomime. His work on Russian and Soviet theater was honored by the St. George Medal of the Russian Ministry of Culture. His writings also studied gender in performance, culminating in The Changing Room: Sex, Drag and Theatre (2000).

== Theater ==
Senelick has directed productions for many groups, including the Opera Company of Boston, Boston Baroque, the Loeb Drama Center, and the Purcell Society. His productions include the US premieres of the Seneca the Younger/Ted Hughes' Oedipus, Robert David MacDonald’s Summit Conference, and Pedro Miguel Rozos’ Our Private Life. As an actor, he performed Samuel Beckett’s Krapp’s Last Tape when he was 73. He serves on the Board of Directors of the Poets Theatre.

== Awards ==
Senelick's work in the classroom has been honored with the Oscar Brockett Outstanding Teacher of Theatre in Higher Education Award of the Association for Theatre in Higher Education and the Betty Jean Jones Award of the American Theatre and Drama Society as Outstanding Teacher of American Theatre and Drama. His books have received prizes such as the Barnard Hewitt Award of the American Society for Theatre Research, the George Freedley Award of the Theatre Library Association, and the George Jean Nathan Award for Dramatic Criticism. His research has been recognized by grants from the Guggenheim Foundation and he has been named a Fellow of the American Academy of Arts and Sciences, the College of Fellows of the American Theatre, and the Berlin Institute for Advanced Studies

== Personal life ==
Laurence Senelick's brother is the neurologist and author Dr. Richard Senelick. Senelick’s life partner was the novelist and screenwriter Michael McDowell; they were together for 30 years until McDowell’s death in 1999.

== Selected bibliography ==
=== As author ===
- Senelick, Laurence (2022). The Final Curtain: The Art of Dying on Stage. London, United Kingdom: Anthem Press. ISBN 9781839983924.
- Senelick, Laurence (2017). Jacques Offenbach and The Making of Modern Culture. Cambridge, United Kingdom. ISBN 9781139029643.
- Senelick, Laurence (2015). Historical Dictionary of Russian Theatre 2nd Edition (Second ed.). Lanham, Maryland. ISBN 9781442249264.
- Senelick, Laurence (2007). Historical Dictionary of Russian Theatre. Lanham, Md.: Scarecrow Press. ISBN 9780810857926.
- Senelick, Laurence (2000). The Changing Room: Sex, Drag, and Theatre. London: Routledge. ISBN 9780415159869.
- Senelick, Laurence (1997). The Chekhov Theatre: A Century of the Plays in Performance. Cambridge, UK. ISBN 0-521-44075-0.
- Senelick, Laurence (1999). The Age and Stage of George L. Fox, 1825-1877 (Expanded ed.). Iowa City: University of Iowa Press. ISBN 9780877456841.
- Senelick, Laurence (1987). The Prestige of Evil: The Murderer as Romantic Hero from Sade to Lacenaire. New York: Garland. ISBN 9780824084349.
- Senelick, Laurence (1984). Serf Actor: The Life and Art of Mikhail Shchepkin. Westport, Conn.: Greenwood Press. ISBN 9780313224942.
- Senelick, Laurence (1982). Gordon Craig's Moscow Hamlet: A Reconstruction. Westport, Conn.: Greenwood Press. ISBN 9780313224959.
- Senelick, Laurence (1981). British Music-Hall, 1840-1923: A Bibliography and Guide to Sources, with a Supplement on European Music-Hall. Hamden, Conn.: Archon Books. ISBN 9780208018403.

=== As editor or translator ===
- Editor and translator (with Sergei Ostrovsky), The Soviet Theater: A Documentary History. New Haven: Yale University Press. 2014. ISBN 978-0300194760.
- Editor and translator, Stanislavsky: A Life in Letters. London: Routledge. 2014. ISBN 9780415516686.
- Editor, The American Stage: Writing on Theater from Washington Irving to Tony Kushner. New York: Library of America. 2010. ISBN 978-1598530698.
- Editor, Theatre Arts on Acting. London: Routledge. 2008. ISBN 9780415774932.
- Editor, Lovesick: Modernist Plays of Same-Sex Love, 1894-1925. London: Routledge. 1998. ISBN 9780415185578.
- Editor, Gender in Performance: The Presentation of Difference in the Performing Arts. Hanover [N.H.]: University Press of New England. 1992. ISBN 9780874515459.
- Editor, Wandering Stars: Russian Emigré Theatre, 1905-1940. Iowa City, IA: University of Iowa Press. 1992. ISBN 9780877453895.
- Editor and translator, Cabaret Performance: Sketches, Songs, Monologues, Memoirs. Europe 1890-1940. 2 vols. Baltimore: PAJ/Johns Hopkins University Press. 1989–1992. ISBN 978-0801845437.
- Editor, National Theatre in Northern and Eastern Europe, 1746-1900. Cambridge: Cambridge University Press. 1991. ISBN 9780521244466.
- Editor and translator, Russian Dramatic Theory from Pushkin to the Symbolists: An Anthology (1st ed.). Austin: University of Texas Press. 1981. ISBN 0292770251.
- Editor and translator, The Complete Plays of Anton Chekhov (1st ed.). New York: W.W. Norton. 2007. ISBN 9780393330694.
