= Thomas Wallis (priest) =

Anglican priest

Thomas Wallis (2 September 1649 – 26 November 1695) was an Anglican priest in Ireland in the 17th century.

Wallis was born in County Dublin and educated at Trinity College, Dublin. He was Dean of Waterford from 1685 to 1691; and Dean of Derry from 1691 until his death.
