= Elinor Fuchs =

American theater scholar (1933–2024)

- Born: January 23, 1933
- Died: May 28, 2024 (aged 91)
- Occupations: Theater scholar, critic, playwright

Elinor Fuchs (January 23, 1933 – May 28, 2024) was an American theater scholar, critic, and playwright.

== Biography ==
Fuchs wrote or edited several germinal books, notably Year One of the Empire: A Play of American Politics, War, and Protest Taken From the Historical Record (1973), The Death of Character: Reflections on Theater After Modernism (1996), winner of the George Jean Nathan Award in Dramatic Criticism, and Land/Scape/Theater (2002; co-edited with Una Chaudhuri). Her 2005 memoir, Making an Exit: A Mother-Daughter Drama With Alzheimer's, Machine Tools, and Laughter meditated on the difficulties of aging and dementia. Fuchs served on the faculties of Harvard, Columbia, Emory, New York University, and Berlin's Institut für Theatrewissenschaft of the Free University.

Fuchs died on May 28, 2024, at the age of 91.

== Published works ==
1973: Year One of the Empire: A Play of American Politics, War, and Protest Taken From the Historical Record

1996: The Death of Character: Reflections on Theater After Modernism

2002: Land/Scape/Theater (co-edited with Una Chaudhuri)

2005: Making an Exit: A Mother-Daughter Drama With Alzheimer's, Machine Tools, and Laughter (meditations on the difficulties of aging and dementia.)

== Recognition ==
The Death of Character: Reflections on Theater After Modernism (1996), won the George Jean Nathan Award in Dramatic Criticism

Fuchs served on the faculties of Harvard, Columbia, Emory, New York University, and Berlin's Institut für Theatrewissenschaft of the Free University.
