= Richard Gilman =

American literary critic (1923–2006)

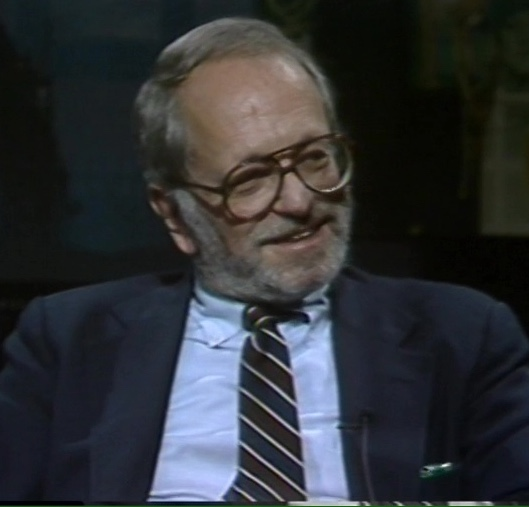
- Gilman on CUNY TV's Cinema Then, Cinema Now (1987)
- Born: April 30, 1923; Brooklyn, New York
- Died: October 28, 2006 (aged 83); Kusatsu, Japan
- Spouses: Esther Morgenstern (m. 1949, divorced) Lynn Nesbit (m.1966, divorced); Yasuko Shiojiri (m. 1992)

Richard Martin Gilman (April 30, 1923 – October 28, 2006) was an American drama and literary critic.

== Early life ==
On April 30, 1923, Gilman was born as Richard Martin Gilman in Brooklyn, New York, U.S. Gilman's family is Jewish.

== Education ==
In 1947, Gilman graduated with a B.A. from the University of Wisconsin.

== Career ==
Gilman enlisted into the U.S. Marine Corps in 1941 and was stationed in the Pacific during World War II. After his service, he attended the New School for Social Research in New York.

Gilman was a freelance writer. After converting to Catholicism, he wrote for the left-leaning Catholic journal Commonweal and from 1964 to 1967, he was the drama critic for Newsweek.

In 1967, the dean of the Yale School of Drama, Robert Brustein, invited him to teach. Gilman was a professor at Yale School of Drama for 31 years. He also taught at Columbia, Princeton, Stanford, Barnard and the City University of New York.

Gilman was the author of five books of criticism, and a memoir.

== Personal life ==
In 1949, Gilman married painter Esther Morgenstern. In 1966, Gilman married Lynn Nesbit, a literary agent, (who would go on to co-found the literary agency Janklow & Nesbit Associates with Morton L. Janklow), In 1992, Gilman married Japanese scholar, Yasuko Shiojiri, who would translate his books into Japanese. Gilman has three children from his first two marriages: Nicholas, Priscilla, and Claire.

Gilman died of lung cancer on October 28, 2006, at the age of 83 at his home in Kusatsu, Shiga Prefecture, Japan.

He was born Jewish, converted to Catholicism as an adult, and lapsed from that faith eight years later. His memoir Faith, Sex, Mystery is primarily devoted to explaining his conversion and deconversion.
