= Kenneth Gross (scholar) =

Kenneth Gross (born April 2, 1954) is an American scholar whose work ranges from early modern English literature, especially Spenser and Shakespeare, to modern poetry and fiction; he is the Alan F. Hilfiker Distinguished Professor of English at the University of Rochester. After undergraduate study at Hamilton College, he earned a Ph.D. in English literature from Yale University in 1982. His research has been supported by grants from the New York Public Library, the Guggenheim Memorial Foundation, the National Endowment for the Humanities, the American Academy in Berlin, and the Folger Shakespeare Library. In 2010 he received the Goergen Award for Excellence in Undergraduate Teaching, and in 2012, he was awarded the George Jean Nathan Award for Dramatic Criticism for his book Puppet: An Essay on Uncanny Life.

== Works ==
- Dangerous Children: On Seven Novels and a Story (2022)
- (as editor) John Hollander - The Substance of Shadow: A Darkening Trope in Poetic History
- (as editor) On Dolls
- Puppet: An Essay on Uncanny Life (2011)
- Shylock Is Shakespeare (2006)
- Shakespeare's Noise (2001)
- The Dream of the Moving Statue (1992)
- Spenserian Poetics: Idolatry, Iconoclasm, and Magic (1985)
