= Marvin Carlson =

American theatrologist

Marvin Albert Carlson (born September 15, 1935) is an American theatrologist, currently the Sidney E. Cohn Distinguished Professor at the Graduate Center of the City University of New York, and also previously the Walker-Ames Professor at University of Washington. A largely collected author, his work covers mainly the history of theatre in Europe from the 18th to the 20th century.

== Selected works ==
- Performance: A Critical Introduction. Routledge, 1980 ISBN 978-0415137034
- The Haunted Stage: The Theatre as Memory Machine. University of Michigan Press, 2003 ISBN 978-0-472-08937-6
- Speaking in Tongues: Languages at Play in the Theatre. University of Michigan Press, 2009 ISBN 978-0-472-03392-8
- Shattering Hamlet's Mirror: Theatre and Reality. University of Michigan Press, 2016 ISBN 978-0-472-11985-1
- Ten Thousand Nights: Highlights from 50 Years of Theatre-Going. University of Michigan Press, 2017 ISBN 978-0-472-13050-4
