= Robert Brustein =

American writer and producer (1927–2023)

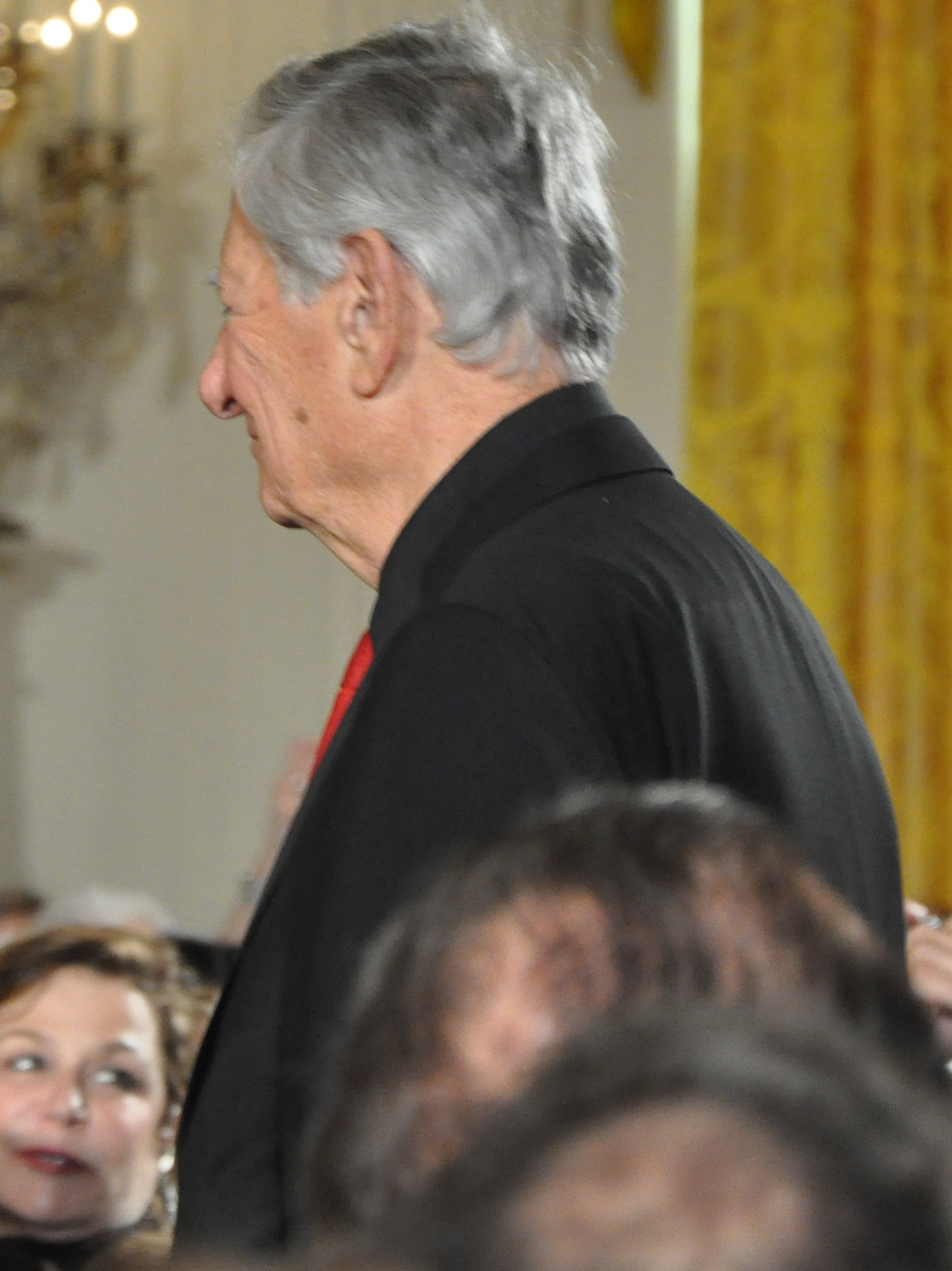
- Brustein in 2011
- Born: Robert Sanford Brustein; April 21, 1927; New York City, U.S.
- Died: October 29, 2023 (aged 96); Cambridge, Massachusetts, U.S.
- Education: Amherst College (BA); Yale University; Columbia University (MA, PhD)
- Occupations: Theatre critic; producer; playwright; educator
- Spouses: Norma Ofstrock (died 1979); Doreen Beinart (m. 1996)
- Children: 2 stepsons, including Peter Beinart
- Writing career
- Notable awards: George Jean Nathan Award for Dramatic Criticism, 1962; George Polk Award, 1964; George Jean Nathan Award for Dramatic Criticism, 1987; National Medal of Arts, 2010

Robert Sanford Brustein (April 21, 1927 – October 29, 2023) was an American theater critic, producer, playwright, writer, and educator. He founded the Yale Repertory Theatre while serving as dean of the Yale School of Drama in New Haven, Connecticut, as well as the American Repertory Theater and Institute for Advanced Theater Training at Harvard University in Cambridge, Massachusetts, where he was a creative consultant until his death, and was the theatre critic for The New Republic.

Brustein was a senior research fellow at Harvard University and a distinguished scholar in residence at Suffolk University in Boston. He was elected to the American Academy of Arts and Letters in 1999, and in 2002, was inducted into the American Theater Hall of Fame. In 2003, he served as a senior fellow with the National Arts Journalism Program at Columbia University, and in 2004/2005, was a senior fellow at the National Endowment for the Arts Arts Journalism Institute in Theatre and Musical Theatre at the University of Southern California. In 2010, he was awarded the National Medal of Arts by President Barack Obama

== Early life and education ==
Robert Sanford Brustein was born in Brooklyn, New York, on April 21, 1927, to Blanche Haft Brustein and Max Brustein. He grew up on the Upper West Side of Manhattan, residing in the same apartment building as Sergei Rachmaninoff. In elementary and high school, his dream was to lead a swing band like Artie Shaw.

Brustein attended The High School of Music & Art. At the age of 16, he enrolled at Amherst College, where he received a BA in medieval history in 1948. When he turned 18, he briefly left Amherst to enlist in the Merchant Marines, though he never saw action as a cadet midshipman at the end of World War II. He spoke about his desire to later avoid being drafted for service in the Korean War (he was not given an exemption for previous service) by continuing his post-graduate education.

Brustein spent an "unhappy year" at the Yale School of Drama studying dramatic literature and criticism before attending Columbia University to complete his MA in 1950. He also held a Fulbright Fellowship to study in the United Kingdom from 1953 to 1955, where he directed plays at the University of Nottingham.

Throughout the later 1940s and into the 1950s, Brustein tried to work as an actor, participating in underground theater companies in New York and Wellesley. He auditioned, to Joseph Papp of The Public, for the lead role in a 1957 production of Richard III, but lost out to George C. Scott.

Brustein received a PhD in 1957 in dramatic literature, supervised by Lionel Trilling. His dissertation was on the playwright John Marston.

== Academic career ==
After teaching at Cornell University, Vassar College, and Columbia, where he became a full professor of dramatic literature in the English department, he became Dean of the Yale School of Drama in 1966, and served in that position until 1979. It was during this period, in 1966, that he founded the Yale Repertory Theatre.

In 1978, Yale announced that it would not renew Brustein's contract when it was set to end in June 1979, not citing any specific reason for ending his tenure. Brustein strongly criticized the decision, and Yale President A. Bartlett Giamatti, for weakening the theater school's ability to properly train future dramatic voices for the American stage, in the name of lowering the barrier of entry for other Yale students interested in theater.

In 1979, Brustein left Yale for Harvard University, where he founded the American Repertory Theater (ART) and became a professor of English. At Harvard, he founded the Institute for Advanced Theater Training. He retired from the artistic directorship of ART in 2002, and then served on the faculty of the institute. He was a distinguished scholar in residence from 2007, at Suffolk University, where he taught courses in Shakespeare Analysis. As the artistic director of Yale Rep from 1966 to 1979, and of ART from 1980 to 2002, Brustein supervised over 200 productions, acting in eight and directing twelve.

As head of ART, Brustein engaged in a public disagreement with Samuel Beckett over a 1984 production of his play Endgame, directed by JoAnne Akalaitis. Akalaitis's direction featured black actors, music from Philip Glass, and a subway tunnel setting, all of which offended Beckett's stated vision for the staging. Brustein defended the production's ability to freely interpret Beckett's words as they saw fit. He negotiated a compromise with Beckett that would avert legal action and allow the play to proceed as staged, but included a program insert from Beckett disavowing the choices:

“My play requires an empty room and two small windows. The American Repertory Theater production which dismisses my directions is a complete parody of the play as conceived by me. Anybody who cares for the work couldn’t fail to be disgusted by this.”

== Critical work ==
Brustein was the theatre critic for The New Republic from 1959 into the 2000s, and later contributed to The Huffington Post.

His critical style was defined as "pugilistic" and "pugnacious"—especially with his harsh criticism of artists—which he later regretted. In 2014, Tennessee Williams biographer John Lahr and Brustein spoke about a 1980 review of Williams's Clothes for a Summer Hotel where Brustein had written:

"I suspect the playwright would just as soon let the moment pass in silence while he licks his wounds and ponders his next move (perhaps a flight to Three Mile Island on a one-way ticket).”

To Lahr, Brustein disavowed the words, saying that he couldn't "imagine making such a cruel and aggressive remark."

He authored sixteen books on theatre and society:

- 1964: The Theatre of Revolt: An Approach to Modern Drama (Little, Brown) ISBN 0-929587-53-7 – essays on Ibsen, Strindberg, Chekhov, Shaw, Brecht, Pirandello, O'Neill, and Artaud and Genet, considered a "standard critical text on modern drama"
- 1965: Seasons of Discontent: Dramatic Opinions 1959–1965 (Simon and Schuster) ISBN none – "an assemblage of his best magazine pieces from 1959 to [1965]"
- 1969: The Third Theatre (Knopf) ISBN 0-671-20537-4 – "a collection of pieces written between 1957 and 1968 ... that deal not only with theatre but also with literature, culture, and the movies" (from the Preface).
- 1971: Revolution as Theatre: Notes on the New Radical Style (Liveright) ISBN 0-87140-238-6 – examines campus turmoil, radicalism versus liberalism, the fate of the free university, the new revolutionary life style, the decadence of American society, and the sentimentality and false emotionalism of radical alternatives
- 1975: The Culture Watch: Essays on Theatre and Society, 1969–1974 (Knopf) ISBN 0-394-49814-3 – "As far as these bristling exhortations go, well, you have to wish the gadfly well"
- 1980: Critical Moments: Reflection on Theatre & Society, 1973–1979 (Random House) ISBN 0394510933 – "Can the Show Go On?", "The Future of the Endowments", "The Artist and the Citizen" and other essays on the state of American theatre.
- 1981: Making Scenes: A Personal History of the Turbulent Years at Yale, 1966–1979 (Random House) ISBN 0-394-51094-1 – Brustein looks at his time at Yale as part "of a larger social and cultural pattern"
- 1987: Who Needs Theatre: Dramatic Opinions (Atlantic Monthly) ISBN 0-571-15194-9 – a collection of reviews and essays including "an assessment of hits like 'Cats' and '42nd Street', Polish theatre, drama on apartheid and the Broadway vogue for British imports."
- 1991: Reimagining American Theatre (Hill & Wang) ISBN 0-8090-8058-3 – reviews and essays, mostly from The New Republic considering the state of American theater in the 1980s.
- 1994: Dumbocracy in America: Studies in the Theatre of Guilt, 1987–1994 (Ivan R. Dee) ISBN 1-56663-098-3 – "uses the prism of the American theatre to explore the motivating impulses behind rampant political correctness and to assess government efforts to regulate the arts"
- 1998: Cultural Calisthenics: Writings on Race, Politics, and Theatre (Ivan R. Dee) ISBN 1-56663-266-8 – "Many of these essays ... are concerned with how "extra-artistic considerations'" – multiculturalism, gay rights, women's issues and political correctness – impair current thought, including that of arts funding agencies."
- 2001: The Siege of the Arts: Collected Writings, 1994–2001 (Ivan R. Dee) ISBN 1-56663-380-X – "The opening essays lead the charge against The Three Horsemen of the Anti-Culture: political, moral, and middlebrow aesthetic correctness ... allied with corporate capitalism and a rigid multiculturalism"
- 2005: Letters to a Young Actor: A Universal Guide to Performance (Basic Books) ISBN 0-465-00806-2 – "A guidebook for performers on stage and screen [which] aims to inspire struggling dramatists and also reinvigorate the very state of the art of acting itself."
- 2006: Millennial Stages: Essays and Reviews 2001–2005 (Yale Univ. Press) ISBN 0-300-11577-6 – "examines crucial issues relating to theater in the post-9/11 years, analyzing specific plays, emerging and established performers, and theatrical production throughout the world"
- 2009: The Tainted Muse: Prejudices and Preconceptions in Shakespeare's Works and Times "an untainted lens through which to see Shakespeare as never before"
- 2011: Rants and Raves: Opinions, Tributes, and Elegies
- 2014: Winter Passages: Essays and Criticism

Brustein was the writer and narrator of a WNET television series in 1966 called The Opposition Theatre. He also commented on contemporary social and political issues for the Huffington Post.

=== Conflict with August Wilson ===
In 1996 and 1997, Brustein was involved in an extended public debate – through their essays, speeches and personal appearances – with African-American playwright August Wilson about multiculturalism, color-blind casting, and other issues where race impacts on the craft and practice of theatre in America. "The feud," wrote Bruce Weber in the New York Times, "... reached a climax in 1997 with an extraordinary public debate in front of a sold-out house at Town Hall in Midtown Manhattan."

=== Other conflicts ===
Brustein criticized the not-for-profit theaters for developing commercial work and becoming tryout houses for Broadway. His fellow directors of regional theaters felt betrayed. A series of articles and letters followed in the New York Times and elsewhere. Critics from the Boston Globe and the Boston Phoenix attacked Brustein for his dual roles as producer/director and theater critic, calling it a conflict of interest. The critic Davi Napoleon wrote an essay that included quotations from other critics who said that Brustein's dual roles made him uniquely qualified to review theater with insight and intelligence. Napoleon pointed out that while Brustein sometimes reviewed colleagues and former students, he did not always review them favorably.

== Playwright ==
As a playwright, Brustein both authored plays and adapted the material of other authors.

=== Adaptations ===
During his tenure at ART, Brustein wrote eleven adaptations, including Henrik Ibsen's The Wild Duck, The Master Builder, and When We Dead Awaken, the last directed by Robert Wilson; Three Farces and a Funeral, adapted from the works and life of Anton Chekhov; Luigi Pirandello's Enrico IV; and Brustein's final production at ART, Lysistrata by Aristophanes, directed by Andrei Serban.

Adaptations which he also directed while at ART include a Pirandello trilogy: Six Characters in Search of an Author, which won the Boston Theatre Award for Best Production of 1996, Right You Are (If You Think You Are), and Tonight We Improvise; Ibsen's Ghosts, Chekhov's The Cherry Orchard, Strindberg's The Father, and Thomas Middleton's The Changeling.

Brustein also conceived and adapted the musical Shlemiel the First, based on the stories of Isaac Bashevis Singer and set to traditional klezmer music, which was directed and choreographed by David Gordon. After the original presentation in 1994 at ART and in Philadelphia at the American Music Theatre Festival, who co-produced the show, Shlemiel the First was revived several times in Cambridge and subsequently played at the Lincoln Center Serious Fun Festival, the American Conservatory Theater in San Francisco, and the Geffen Playhouse in Los Angeles, as well as touring theatres on the east coast of Florida and in Stamford, Connecticut. The play has also been produced at Theater J in Washington, D.C.. A remount of the original David Gordon production was presented by Peak Performances at Montclair State University's Kasser Theatre in January 2010, and went on to a three-week run at New York University's Skirball Center for the Performing Arts.

Brustein's klezmer musical, with composer Hankus Netsky, The King of Second Avenue, an adaptation of Israel Zangwill's The King of the Schnorrers, was produced at the New Repertory Theatre in 2015.

=== Original works ===
Brustein's full-length plays include Demons, Nobody Dies on Friday, The Face Lift, Spring Forward, Fall Back, and his Shakespeare Trilogy The English Channel, Mortal Terror, and "The Last Will."

Demons, which was broadcast on WGBH radio in 1993, had its stage world premiere as part of the American Repertory Theater New Stages Season. Nobody Dies on Friday was given its world premiere in the same series and was presented at the Singapore Arts Festival and the Pushkin Theatre in Moscow. It was included in Marisa Smith's anthology New Playwrights: Best Plays of 1998.

Spring Forward, Fall Back was produced in 2006 at the Vineyard Playhouse on Martha's Vineyard and at Theater J in Washington. The English Channel was produced at the C. Walsh Theatre of Suffolk University in Boston and at the Vineyard Playhouse in the fall of 2007. In the Fall of 2008, it played at the Abingdon Theatre in New York where it was nominated for a Pulitzer Prize.

His short plays Poker Face, Chekhov on Ice, Divestiture, AnchorBimbo, Noises, Terrorist Skit, Airport Hell, Beachman's Last Poetry Reading, "Sex For a Change", and Kosher Kop were all presented by the Boston Playwrights' Theatre and form a play called "Seven/Elevens.

Brustein was also the author of Doctor Hippocrates is Out: Please Leave a Message an anthology of theatrical and cinematic satire on medicine and physicians, commissioned by the Institute for Healthcare Improvement for its 2008 convention in Nashville. Brustein's musical satire, Exposed, was performed in 2014 at the Martha's Vineyard Playhouse.

== Personal life and death ==
Brustein was married to actress Norma Ofstrock until her death in 1979. (Brustein was the stepfather to Norma Ofstrock's son from a previous marriage, Phil Cates). That marriage resulted in a son, Daniel Brustein.

In 1996, Brustein married activist and academic Doreen Beinart. Through this marriage, he became the stepfather of journalist Peter Beinart and of Jean Stern.

Brustein died at his home in Cambridge, Massachusetts, on October 29, 2023, at the age of 96.

== Awards and honors ==
Brustein was the recipient of many awards and honors, including:

- c.1953: Fulbright Fellowship to the University of Nottingham, 1953–1955
- 1961: John Simon Guggenheim Memorial Foundation Fellowship
- 1962, 1987: Twice winner of the George Jean Nathan Award for Dramatic Criticism: in 1962 for his reviews in Commentary, Partisan Review, Harpers and New Republic; and in 1987 for Who Needs Theatre: Dramatic Opinions. Brustein is the only person to have received this award more than once.
- 1964: George Polk Award for Journalism (Criticism)
- 1984: the 2nd Elliot Norton Award For Professional Excellence in Boston Theatre, known at the time as the Norton Prize, presented by the Boston Theater District Association, and now given by StageSource: the Greater Boston Theatre Alliance
- 1985: New England Theatre Conference's Major Award for outstanding creative achievement in the American theatre
- 1995: American Academy of Arts and Letters Award for Distinguished Service to the Arts
- 1999: Elected to the American Academy of Arts and Letters
- 2000: Association for Theatre in Higher Education Career Achievement Award for Professional Theatre
- 2001: The Commonwealth Award for Organizational Leadership (Massachusetts' highest honor)
- 2002: Inducted into the American Theatre Hall of Fame
- 2003: United States Institute for Theatre Technology Lifetime Achievement Award
- 2003: National Corporate Theatre Fund chairman's Award for Achievement in Theatre
- 2005: Gann Academy Award for Excellence in the Performing Arts
- 2008: Eugene O'Neill Foundation's Tao House Award for serving the American theatre with distinction
- 2010: National Medal of Arts
- 2011: Players Club Hall of Fame

In addition, Brustein received the Pirandello Medal, and a medal from the Egyptian government for contributions to world theatre. His papers are housed at the Howard Gotlieb Archival Research Center at Boston University.
