= Diana Oh =

American artist and activist (1986–2025)

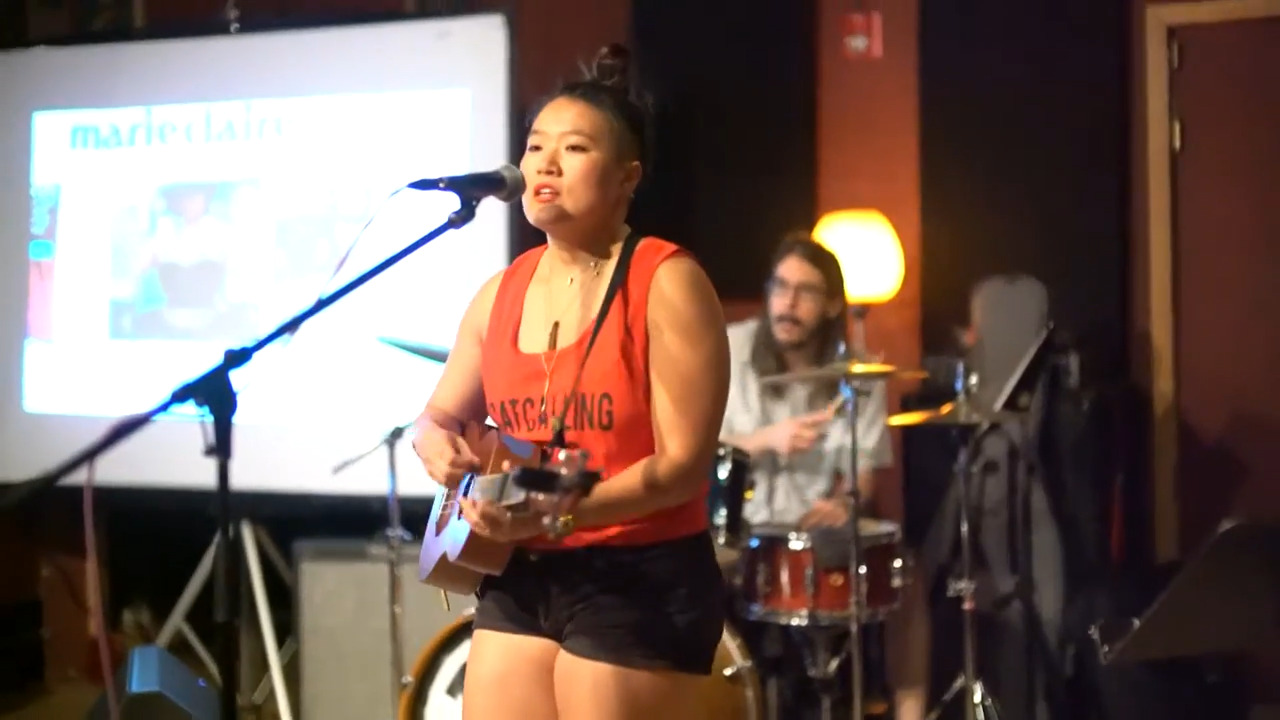
- Oh in 2016
- Born: Yea Bin Oh; September 29, 1986; Los Angeles, California, U.S.
- Died: June 17, 2025 (aged 38); New York City, U.S.

Diana Oh (September 29, 1986 – June 17, 2025), also known as Zaza, was an American playwright, actor, singer-songwriter and musician who was known for the off-Broadway show titled My Lingerie Play.

== Early life and education ==
Oh was born Yea Bin Oh on September 29, 1986, in Los Angeles, California, to professors who had emigrated to the U.S. from South Korea in the 1970s. They attended Beverly Hills High School before earning a degree in theater at Smith College in 2008 and an MFA from the Graduate Musical Theater Writing Program at the New York University Tisch School of the Arts in 2010.

== Career ==
After graduating college, Oh was cast to play Marisol in the 2013 off-off-Broadway comedy play Frankenstein Upstairs and assorted characters in the 2015 American premiere of Lucy Kirkwood's Chimerica at the Studio Theatre in Washington, D.C. In 2016, they had a role in the film How to Be Single, and in the theatre, they played a Dandy Minion in the premiere of A 24-Decade History of Popular Music and Number Four, a comfort woman, in Hansol Jung's Among the Dead.

From 2014 to 2017, Oh staged My Lingerie Play (stylized as {my lingerie play}), a series of 10 art/performance installations at public areas and small theatres in New York and Washington D.C., as well as on the internet. In the initial eight performances, Oh stood on a soapbox wearing just their underwear, a black hat, and sunglasses, holding two brown paper bags on which they had written about slut-shaming, street harassment, and violence against women. Some performances involved additional people, and Oh invited spectator participation at the installations. These concluded in October 2017 with a concert performance, titled {my lingerie play} 2017: Installation #9: THE CONCERT AND CALL TO ARMS!!!!!!!!!, the final installation, at the Rattlestick Playwrights Theater in New York, with final outdoor performance (Installation 10/10 (The FINAL Final Installation)) scheduled afterwards at Washington Square Park.

The concert performance was just under two hours long and featured music performed by Oh and their band; The New York Times described the show as "more of an indie band concert" than a traditional play. The show began with Oh in a bathrobe on a soapbox with paper bags inviting the audience to write messages on their own bags. Audience members were given bubble wands to blow during the performance and invited to dress up with body glitter, temporary tattoos, jewelry and other cosmetics at a "shimmer station". As the show went on, Oh undressed to reveal their "mostly shoplifted" underwear and discussed their life, human sexuality and sexual harassment, gender, race and racism, transphobia, and current events including the Pulse nightclub shooting and the 2016 United States presidential election. A central theme being liberation, Oh also went topless, held what the Time Out New York magazine termed a "funny and genuinely erotic" discussion about consent with an audience member they made out with, and invited other audience members to have their heads shaved on stage. The show ended with audience members standing around the edge of the theatre, holding the brown paper bags they themselves had written on earlier.

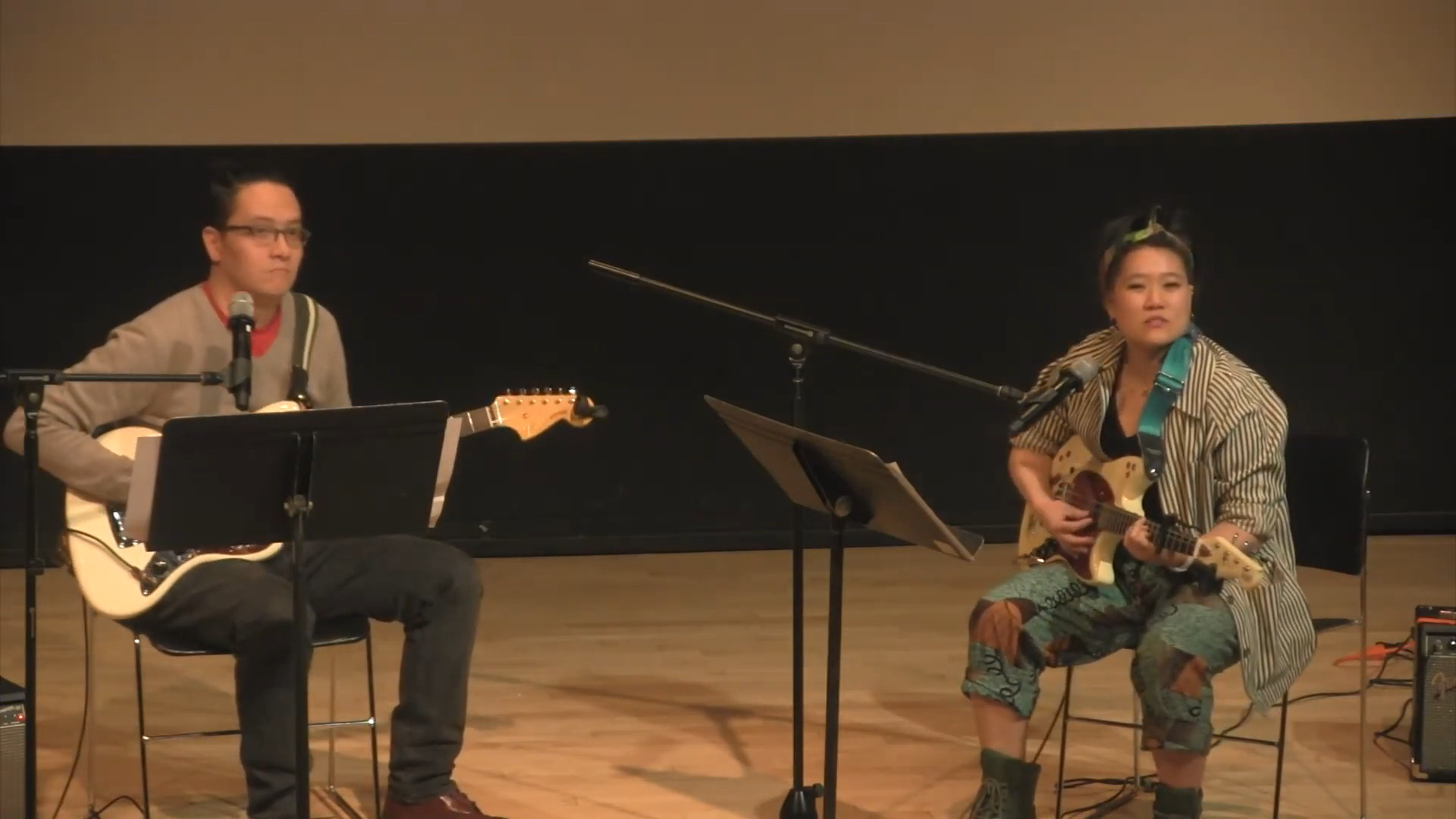
Oh (right) in 2018 at the Segal Theatre Center in New York

In early 2018, Oh began planning an additional performance of My Lingerie Play, this time in Massachusetts, at the invitation of the director of the American Repertory Theater. However, after talking with a spiritual counselor, Oh decided to stop performing the play, and was instead offered a residency at the theatre. The five installations they produced, Clairvoyance, began in October 2018 and was scheduled to run through April 2019. It involved, among other activities, staging "Chosen Family Portraits" with the audience and planting trees at Harvard University. Also in 2018 and 2019, they played Devon in the webseries Queering and Gretchen in the play Georgia Mertching is Dead, acted in a tour of Parable of the Sower, and participated in The Public Theater's Emerging Writer's Group. While at The Public Theatre, Oh developed and first performed their play My H8 Letter to the Gr8 American Theatre. Oh and the cast returned in 2020 to perform the play on Zoom for the Ma-Yi Theater Company, where Oh was a writer.

Oh's best-known works also included The Infinite Love Party, described as "all-night slumber party at the off-off-Broadway Bushwick Starr that contained a potluck, dance party, a working swing, an open mic, and live music from Oh". In 2022, they were awarded a Helen Merrill Award for Playwriting by The New York Community Trust. For the 2024 Breaking the Binary Theatre Festival, Oh wrote and directed the play A Rare Bird. Oh and playwright Lloyd Suh were commissioned by the Ma-Yi Theater Company in 2023 to write a musical titled The Science Fair Project, which was still in progress at the time of Oh's death.

== Personal life, illness and death ==
Oh described themself as genderfluid in 2016 and went by they/them pronouns at the time of their death. They also identified as a witch.

Oh was diagnosed with bipolar disorder. They died by suicide at their home in Brooklyn, New York City, on June 17, 2025, at age 38.

== Credits ==
=== Theatre ===
Year	Title	Role	Notes	Ref.
2013	Frankenstein Upstairs	Marisol		
2015	Chimerica	Assorted characters		
2016	A 24-Decade History of Popular Music	Dandy Minion		
2016	Among the Dead	Number Four		
2017	{my lingerie play} 2017: THE CONCERT AND CALL TO ARMS!!!!!!!!!			
2019	The Infinite Love Party			
2019	Clairvoyance			
2019	Georgia Mertching Is Dead	Gretchen		
2019, 2020	My H8 Letter to the Gr8 American Theatre			
2021	Walden	Stella		
2024	A Rare Bird		Writer/director, credited as Zaza Diana Oh	

=== Filmography ===
Year	Title	Role	Ref.
2016	How to Be Single	Sign in Lady	
2018-2019	Queering	Devon	
