= Wolf Play =

2023 play by Hansol Jung

- Show art for the Off-Broadway production in 2023.
- Original language: English
- Written by: Hansol Jung
- Characters: Ash; Robin; Ryan; Peter; Wolf
- Genre: Comedy, Drama

Premiere
- Date: March 2019
- Place: Artists Repertory Theatre

Wolf Play is a comedic and dramatic stage play written by South Korean playwright Hansol Jung. The play debuted in 2019 at the Artists Repertory Theatre, and later off-Broadway as a co-production with MCC Theater, Ma-Yi Theatre Company and Soho Rep. The Off-Broadway production won the 2023 Lucille Lortel Award for Outstanding Play.

The play tells the story of a Korean boy, portrayed as a puppet "Jeenu" and puppeteer "Wolf", the latter of whom acts as the boy's inner voice. Jeenu is brought to a new home by his adoptive American father, only to find that the household belongs to a nonbinary American boxer and their wife. As the play goes on, the guarded Jeenu gradually opens up to his new parents while his former adoptive father attempts to reclaim the boy.

== Plot ==
"Wolf", the play's narrator, greets the audience with a monologue on the nature of theater and reality. He tells the audience to imagine he is a wolf, before revealing an Asian boy puppet. The puppet, whom Wolf operates, is the adopted son of Peter, who has also named this child "Peter" after adopting him from Korea. Due to disagreements with his wife, the elder Peter has connected with Robin via an online forum to transfer custody of the child to her and her spouse. After signing the contract, however, Peter is incensed to learn Robin is married to a non-binary person, Ash, protesting as he leaves that his son will not have a father. Despite their own reluctance to accept the adoption, Ash quickly connects with the boy, whose real name is Jeenu, after recognizing they share an aggressive spirit: Jeenu in imagining himself as a wolf (which the narrator "Wolf" represents as his inner voice, largely invisible to the other actors) and Ash's own background as a boxer.

Conflict arises within Jeenu's extended family as his new parents disagree over Jeenu's occasionally violent behavior, his reluctance to bond with Robin yet easy connection with Ash, and Peter's attempts to regain custody of Jeenu. Additionally, Robin's brother and Ash's trainer Ryan is suspicious of the boy and believes him a distraction from Ash's boxing career. Peter soon becomes friendly with Ryan and plants in his mind the idea that Ash and Robin are not fit to be parents. When Ash loses a boxing match due to being distracted by Jeenu trying to enter the ring, they tell Ryan of their intention to quit boxing and focus on raising Jeenu. Ryan tries to remove Jeenu from Ash's life by helping Peter to try to get the child back, eventually taking Robin and Ash to court. At the trial, Peter argues that the initial custody transfer was not legal, but Robin and Ash argue Peter is not fit to be a parent given he tried to sell Jeenu online in the first place. Jeenu/Wolf initially cheers on Robin and Ash but soon becomes overwhelmed at the legal language that he does not understand, and when directly asked by the judge who he wants to have custody of him, he is unable to answer, with Wolf leaving the play.

In the aftermath, it is revealed that neither families got custody, and that Jeenu is to be taken by the state. The trial has had devastating consequences: it has destroyed Peter's own marriage, Ryan is now estranged from his sister, and Ash tries to share breakfast with an unresponsive Jeenu on their last morning together. Robin makes one last attempt to connect with Jeenu, addressing the lifeless puppet by repeating Wolf's monologue back to it while assuring that she will fight to get him back with all her being. Wolf returns, drawn by her words, and Robin appears to see him for the first time.

== Cast and characters ==
Character	Artists Repertory Theatre 2019	The Gift Theatre 2019	Company One Theatre 2020	Soho Rep 2022	Off-Broadway 2023
Ash	Tamera Lyn	Isa Arciniegas	Tonasia Jones	Esco Jouléy	Esco Jouléy
Robin	Ayanna Berkshire	Jennifer Glasse	Inés de la Cruz	Nicole Villamil	Nicole Villamil
Ryan	Vin Shambry	Al’Jaleel McGhee	Adrian Peguero	Brian Quijada	Brian Quijada
Peter	Chris Harder	Tim Martin	Greg Maraio	Aubie Merrylees	Christopher Bannow
Wolf	Christopher Larkin	Dan Lin	Minh-Anh Day	Mitchell Winter	Mitchell Winter

== Production history ==
The show premiered at the Artists Repertory Theatre in Portland, Oregon on March 19, 2019 and ran through April 7, 2019, directed by Dámaso Rodríguez, starring Christopher Larkin as Wolf. The show received acclaim. Subsequent productions were staged in Chicago at the Gift Theatre in 2019 and at Company One in Boston, both also receiving critical acclaim.

Wolf Play was to have its New York premiere Off-Off Broadway at Soho Repertory Theatre in 2020, directed by Dustin Wills and starring Jin Ha as Wolf, but the production was shut down only a few days into technical rehearsals due to the COVID-19 pandemic. Wolf Play eventually opened at Soho Rep in February 2022 in a co-production with Ma-Yi Theater Company, once again directed by Wills with a slightly different cast. The production received critical acclaim, with The New York Times lauding the performances as "uniformly strong" and the play "thrilling." The success of the production led to it transferring off-Broadway to MCC Theater, with most of the Soho Rep cast reprising their roles. It received similar acclaim, winning five Lucille Lortel Awards, including Outstanding Play, and three Drama League Award nominations. Playwright Hansol Jung was nominated for the Outer Critics Circle John Gassner Award for her writing.

The play has since been performed regionally, including productions at American Conservatory Theater in San Francisco, California and Shotgun Players in Los Angeles, California.

== Awards and nominations ==
=== 2019 Chicago production ===
Year	Award	Category	Nominee	Result	Ref.
2019	Jeff Award	Director – Play – Midsize	Jess McLeod	Nominated	
2019	Jeff Award	Sound Design – Midsize	Eric Backus	Nominated	
2019	Jeff Award	Puppet Design	Stephanie Diaz	Nominated	

=== 2023 Off-Broadway production ===
Year	Award	Category	Work	Result	Ref.
2023	Drama Desk Award	Outstanding Featured Performance in a Play	Brian Quijada	Nominated	
2023	Drama League Award	Outstanding Revival of a Play		Nominated	
2023	Drama League Award	Outstanding Direction of a Play	Dustin Wills	Nominated	
2023	Drama League Award	Distinguished Performance	Esco Jouléy	Nominated	
2023	Lucille Lortel Award	Outstanding Play		Won	
2023	Lucille Lortel Award	Outstanding Director	Dustin Wills	Won	
2023	Lucille Lortel Award	Outstanding Ensemble	Christopher Bannow, Esco Jouléy, Brian Quijada, Nicole Villamil, Mitchell Winter	Won	
2023	Lucille Lortel Award	Outstanding Scenic Design	You-Shin Chen	Won	
2023	Lucille Lortel Award	Outstanding Lighting Design	Barbara Samuels	Nominated	
2023	Lucille Lortel Award	Outstanding Sound Design	Kate Marvin	Won	
2023	Outer Critics Circle Award	John Gassner Award	Hansol Jung	Nominated	
