= Ralph Peña =

Ralph Peña may refer to:

- Ralph B. Peña, artistic director
- Ralph Pena (musician), American jazz double bassist and composer
