= Joey Arias =

American singer

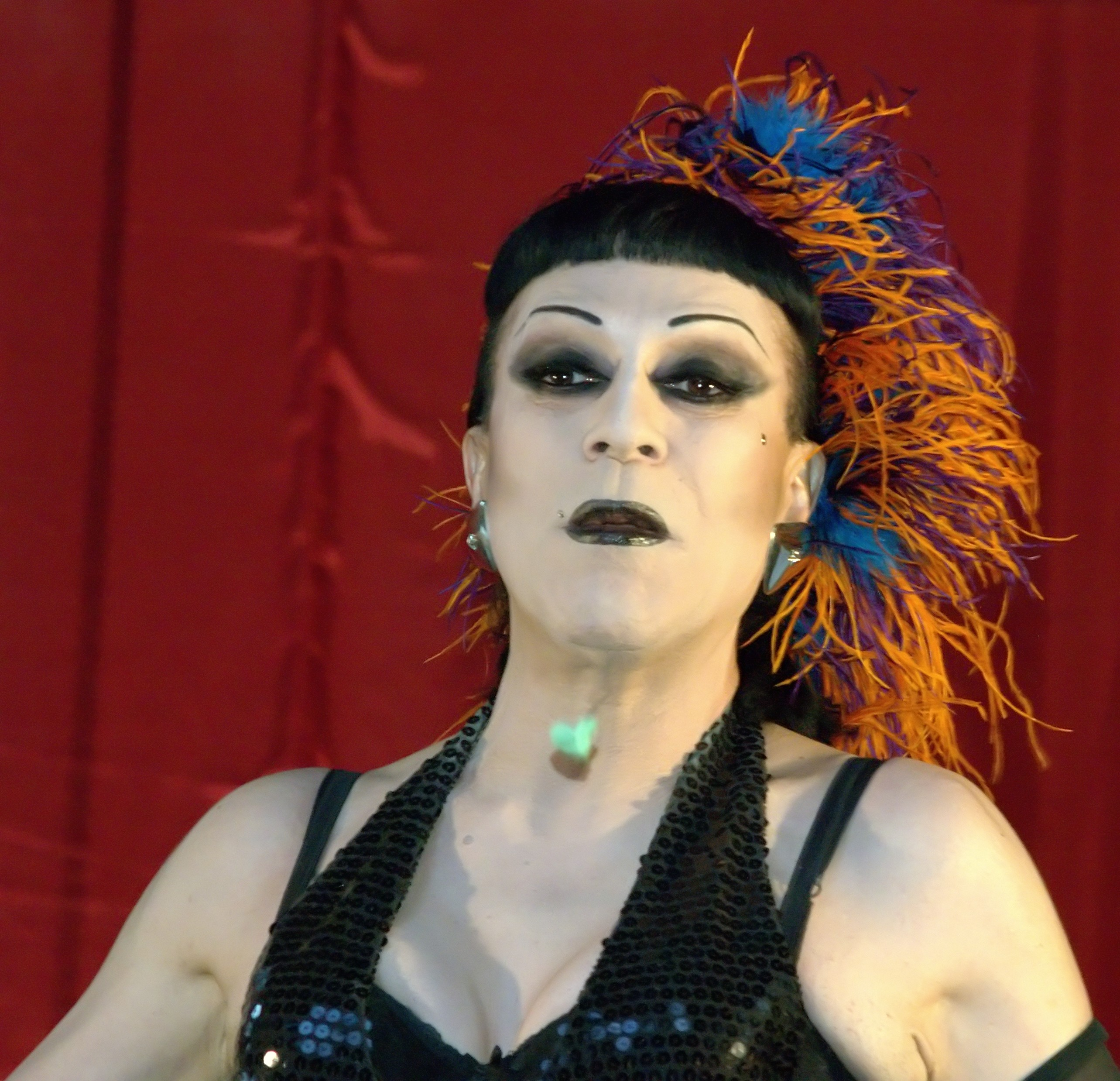
- At the 2009 HOWL! Festival in the East Village
- Born: Fayetteville, North Carolina
- Other names: Joseph Arias, Joe Arias
- Known for: Performance artist, cabaret singer, recording artist

Joey Arias, also known as Joseph Arias and Joe Arias, is an American artist based in New York City, best known for work as a performance artist, cabaret singer, and drag artist, but also as a published author, comedian, stage persona and film actor.

== Career ==
=== 1970s–1980s ===
After high school he sang with the rock band Purlie, which had a 1973 single on Capitol Records, and then had a stint with improvisational comedy group The Groundlings. In 1976 he and his best friend Kim Hastreiter – who would later co-found Paper magazine – drove across country in a pickup truck and moved to New York City.

Arias eventually got a job at the Fiorucci designer clothing store. He and other store staff, like Vincent Gallo, performed (danced and modeled clothes) in the shop windows. While working at the store he became friends with alternative musician Klaus Nomi, for whom he sang backup vocals and designed sets and costumes. On December 15, 1979, Nomi and Arias appeared on Saturday Night Live accompanying David Bowie for a live performance of three songs: "The Man Who Sold the World", "TVC 15" and "Boys Keep Swinging". While in New York, he also performed with Ann Magnuson in a band called Strange Party, which recorded and performed in various night clubs. Upon Nomi's death, Arias became executor to the Klaus Nomi (Sperber) estate. A tribute to his friend is held in Berlin every year, and the documentary film The Nomi Song was released in 2004. A film on the life Arias shared with Nomi was in development in 2010 with Alan Cumming slated to play Nomi.

Arias gradually became involved in the burgeoning 1980s New York performance art scene, appearing regularly at Club 57 and other downtown venues. During these years he also began a career in cabaret, channeling the vocal style and mannerisms of Billie Holiday.

=== 1990s: Stage shows and West Village performances ===
In the early 1990s, Arias covered the songs of Holiday in a show titled Strange Fruit which ran for over a year at the Astor Place Theatre on Lafayette Street in New York City and received a positive notice from John Lahr in The New Yorker.

The 1990s also saw Arias perform in weekly shows at Bar d'O, an intimate lounge in the West Village of New York City. Regular guest performers at Bar d'O included Sade Pendavis, Daniel Isengart and Flotilla Debarge. The evenings have inspired annual reunion shows each December at Indochine restaurant and became the subject of a 2011 documentary film produced by Bobby Sheehan.

=== 2000s–2010s: Las Vegas performances and return to New York ===
In 2003 Arias moved to Las Vegas, Nevada to star in Cirque du Soleil's Zumanity at the New York-New York Hotel & Casino. In addition to starring in the show, he co-wrote two of the show's songs. After six years, Arias returned to New York where he starred in Arias with a Twist, a collaboration with puppeteer Basil Twist at HERE Arts Center. Produced by Barbara Busackino and Tandem Otter Productions, the show received a positive review from Ben Brantley in the New York Times. The show has toured to Los Angeles and Paris and spawned a "docufantasy" film of the same name which premiered at the TriBeCa Film Festival in 2010.

Arias with a Twist: Deluxe, a revamped and expanded version of the show, returned to New York for a limited run at Abrons Arts Center from September 14 to October 16, 2011. Arias' relationship with Abrons began in October 2010 when Joey Arias in Concert marked Arias' first concert appearances in New York in over a decade. Based on the success of the show, Earl Dax collaborated with Josh Wood who produced Arias in concert at New York's Town Hall on April 21, 2010.

=== 2010–present: Ongoing performances and archival acquisition ===
Arias continues to perform in venues such as Joe's Pub and Feinstein's/54 Below.

In 2019, his archives, which also include material relating to Klaus Nomi, were acquired by Harvard's Houghton Library.

In November 2023, Arias's album, Past Present Future, produced by Zachary D. McMillan and Tommy Karl, was released on the label Beige Records NYC.

== Film ==
Arias’ film credits include Big Top Pee-wee; Mondo New York; Elvira, Mistress of the Dark; Flawless; To Wong Foo, Thanks for Everything! Julie Newmar''; and Wigstock: The Movie. He also appears in the 2016 film The Zanctuary by Spanish director José André Sibaja, alongside Amanda Lepore and Sophia Lamar. He appeared in the German documentary Wie ich lernte die Zahlen zu lieben/How I Learned to Love the Numbers (2014) by Oliver Sechting and Max Taubert. In 2012, he was interviewed in the documentary feature film Jobriath A.D.

=== Christmas with the Crawfords ===
Arias portrayed Joan Crawford in New York and San Francisco productions of Christmas with the Crawfords, a spoof of Christina Crawford's book Mommie Dearest that's been a holiday tradition since 1992. The San Francisco-based production premiered Off-Off-Broadway at the Grove Street Playhouse in 2000. Arias also starred in a 2001 and 2015 revival of the play at the Chelsea Playhouse.

== Personal life ==
Born in Fayetteville, North Carolina, Arias was six when he moved with his family to Los Angeles. Arias, who is openly gay, married his long time partner, Scottish artist Juano Diaz in 2014. The couple divorced in 2017.

== Discography ==
=== EPs ===
''Arias on Holiday''

- Released: 1987
- Format: Vinyl
- Label: Flaming Pie Records

=== Albums ===
''Jazzo Lozo''

- Released: 1990
- Format: CD
- Label: Wacoal Art Center / Newsic

''Arias with a Twist (Original Soundtrack)'' (With Basil Twist)

- Released: 2008
- Format: CD
- Label: Not on label

''The Essential Joey Arias''

- Released: 2015
- Format: CD

''PAST PRESENT FUTURE''

- Released: 2023
- Format: Digital download, streaming
- Label: Beige Records NYC

== See also ==
- Drag culture in New York City
- LGBTQ culture in New York City
- List of LGBTQ people from New York City
- NYC Drag March
- NYC Pride March
- Transgender culture in New York City
