= Among the Dead =

Play by Hansol Jung

- Written by: Hansol Jung
- Setting: Burma (1944/45) and Seoul, South Korea (1950 and 1975)

Premiere
- Date premiered: November 6, 2016
- Place premiered: HERE Arts Center

Among the Dead is a play by Hansol Jung. It premiered in November 2016 at the HERE Arts Center under the direction of Ralph B. Peña.

== Plot summary ==
Among the Dead takes place in three main time periods and locations: Burma in 1944/45, the Hangang Bridge in Seoul in 1950, and a hotel room in Seoul in 1975. In 1975, 30 year-old Ana Woods travels to Seoul to scatter her estranged father's ashes. Jesus, appearing as a bell boy, gives Ana a journal of her father's which causes her to relive her parents' story. In 1944, Ana's father, Luke, is fighting in the Burmese jungle when he meets Number Four, a Korean comfort woman. In 1950, Number Four waits on a bridge in Seoul contemplating suicide. As the play continues, it is revealed that Luke assaulted Number Four in 1944 after watching Number Four's sister be assaulted by Japanese soldiers.

== Characters ==
- Ana Woods — a Korean-American
- Luke — an American soldier fighting in Burma, Ana's father
- Number Four —a Korean comfort woman, Ana's mother
- Jesus —a shape-shifting character who first appears as a bell boy

== Performance history ==
Among the Dead premiered at the HERE Arts Center for Ma-Yi Theatre in November 2016 under the direction of Ralph B. Peña. Ma-Yi's production starred Julienne Hanzelka Kim as Ana, Mickey Theis as Luke, Diana Oh as Number Four, and Will Dagger as Jesus. Kenneth Goodwin was the sound designer while Reid Thompson was responsible for scenic design and Galway McCullough was responsible for the fight choreography..

In February 2019, Spooky Action Theatre produced Among the Dead as directed by Richard Henrich. This production starred Julie M as Ana, Nahm Darr as Jesus, Chris Stinson as Luke, and Kyosin Kang as Number Four. April Joy Vester was the set designer and Amy MacDonald designed costumes. In May 2019, Deborah Block directed Among the Dead for Theatre Exile in Philadelphia. Block's production featured Bi Jean Ngo as Ana, James Kern as Luke, Cathy Simpson as Jesus, and Claris Park as Number Four.
