= Drama Desk Award for Outstanding Featured Performance in a Play =

Annual theater award

- Awarded for: Outstanding Featured Performance in a Play
- Location: New York City
- Country: United States
- Presented by: Drama Desk
- First award: 2023
- Currently held by: Alden Ehrenreich, Becky Shaw; Ruben Santiago-Hudson, Joe Turner's Come and Gone; (2026)
- Website: dramadesk.org

The Drama Desk Award for Outstanding Featured Performance in a Play is an annual award presented by Drama Desk in recognition of achievements in the theatre across collective Broadway, off-Broadway and off-off-Broadway productions in New York City.

From 1955 to 1974, acting awards were given only for lead performances, without making distinctions between roles in plays and musicals, nor between actors and actresses. From 1975 to 2022, acting awards were presented in eight categories: separate categories by gender; further divided by lead or featured performer; producing four acting awards each for plays and musicals.

In 2023, the Drama Desk organization announced that, starting with that year's awards, the eight acting categories had been retired and replaced with four gender neutral categories with twice the winners and nominees: separate categories by lead or featured performer; producing two acting categories each for plays and musicals. The former awards for Outstanding Featured Actor in a Play and Outstanding Featured Actress in a Play were merged to create this Outstanding Featured Performance in a Play category.

== Winners and nominees ==
Key

and bold indicates the winner.

=== 2020s ===
| Year | Actor | Title | Character | Ref. |
2023
| 2023 | **Miriam Silverman** | **The Sign in Sidney Brustein's Window** | **Mavis Parodus Bryson** | |
| 2023 | **Brandon Uranowitz** | **Leopoldstadt** | **Ludwig Jakobovicz / Nathan Fischbein** | |
| 2023 | Emily Bergl | Good Night, Oscar | June Levant | |
| 2023 | Danielle Brooks | The Piano Lesson | Berniece | |
| 2023 | Amelda Brown | Love | Barbara | |
| 2023 | Ray Fisher | The Piano Lesson | Lymon | |
| 2023 | K. Todd Freeman | Downstate | Dee | |
| 2023 | Francis Guinan | Downstate | Fred | |
| 2023 | Nick Holder | Love | Colin | |
| 2023 | Arian Moayed | A Doll's House | Torvald Helmer | |
| 2023 | Brian Quijada | Wolf Play | Ryan | |
| 2023 | Kara Young | Cost of Living | Jess | |
2024
| 2024 | **Celia Keenan-Bolger** | **Mother Play** | **Martha** | |
| 2024 | **Kara Young** | **Purlie Victorious** | **Lutiebell Gussie Mae Jenkins** | |
| 2024 | Brittany Adebumola | Jaja's African Hair Braiding | Miriam | |
| 2024 | Marylouise Burke | Infinite Life | Eileen | |
| 2024 | Michael Esper | Appropriate | Franz Lafayette | |
| 2024 | Marin Ireland | Uncle Vanya | Sonya | |
| 2024 | Will Keen | Patriots | Vladimir Putin | |
| 2024 | Conrad Ricamora | Oh, Mary! | Abraham Lincoln | |
| 2024 | Sheila Tousey | Manahatta | Mother / Bobbie | |
| 2024 | Bubba Weiler | Swing State | Ryan | |
2025
| 2025 | **Amalia Yoo** | **John Proctor is the Villain** | **Raelynn Nix** | |
| 2025 | **Kara Young** | **Purpose** | **Aziza Jasper** | |
| 2025 | Greg Keller | Pre-Existing Condition | Performer | |
| 2025 | Julia Lester | All Nighter | Wilma | |
| 2025 | Adrienne C. Moore | The Blood Quilt | Gio | |
| 2025 | Deirdre O’Connell | Glass. Kill. What If If Only. Imp. | Cast | |
| 2025 | Maria-Christina Oliveras | Cymbeline | Queen | |
| 2025 | Maryann Plunkett | Deep Blue Sound | Ella | |
| 2025 | Michael Rishawn | Table 17 | River, Eric, & Others | |
| 2025 | Jude Tibeau | Bad Kreyòl | Pita | |
| 2025 | Anjana Vasan | A Streetcar Named Desire | Stella Kowalski | |
| 2025 | Frank Wood | Hold On to Me Darling | Mitch | |
2026
| 2026 | **Alden Ehrenreich** | **Becky Shaw** | **Max Garrett** | |
| 2026 | **Ruben Santiago-Hudson** | **Joe Turner's Come and Gone** | **Bynum Walker** | |
| 2026 | Caroline Aaron | The Reservoir | Beverly | |
| 2026 | Edoardo Benzoni | Are the Bennett Girls OK? | Men | |
| 2026 | Maria-Christina Oliveras | The Balusters | Luz Baccay | |
| 2026 | Nathan Darrow | (un)conditional | Hank | |
| 2026 | Emily Davis | Well, I'll Let You Go | Angela | |
| 2026 | West Duchovny | Diversion | Mandy | |
| 2026 | Linda Emond | Becky Shaw | Susan Slater | |
| 2026 | David Greenspan | Prince Faggot | Performer 5 | |
| 2026 | River Lipe-Smith | Caroline | Caroline | |
| 2026 | Lizan Mitchell | Cold War Choir Practice | Puddin | |
| 2026 | Richard Thomas | The Balusters | Elliott Emerson | |

== Statistics ==
=== Multiple Wins ===
2 wins

- Kara Young

=== Multiple Nominations ===
3 nominations

- Kara Young

2 nominations

- Maria-Christina Oliveras
