= Michael Luwoye =

American actor of Nigerian descent

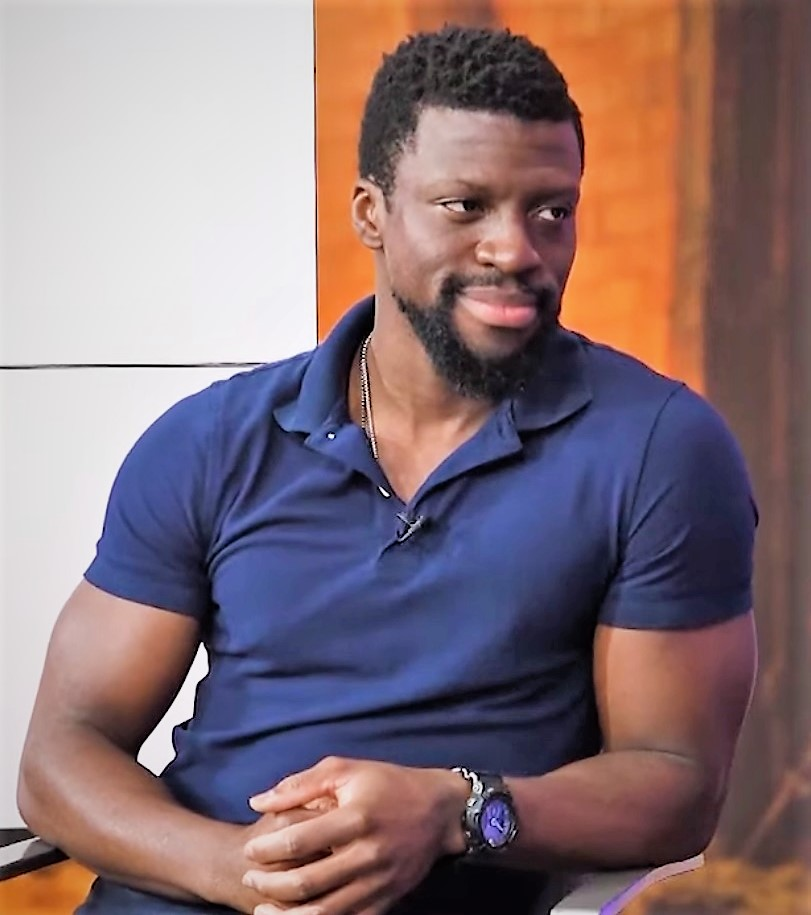
- Luyowe on Sister Circle TV in 2020
- Born: December 19, 1990 (age 35); Huntsville, Alabama, U.S.
- Education: University of Alabama
- Occupations: Actor; singer
- Years active: 2011–present

Michael Luwoye (/luːˈwaɪeɪ/; born December 19, 1990) is an American actor and singer of Nigerian descent, known for playing the title role in the Broadway musical Hamilton. In 2022, was nominated for the Children's and Family Emmy Award for Outstanding Voice Performance in a Preschool Animated Program for his role in Baby Shark's Big Show!.

== Early life and education ==
Michael Luwoye was born in Huntsville, Alabama, the youngest of four children born to immigrants from Nigeria who settled in Alabama in the 1980s. His mother was an engineer, and his father became the owner of a wholesale ice cream distribution business.

An artistic child, Luwoye drew and wrote journals, and learned to play guitar. He learned music theory and composition while attending Lee High School in Huntsville.

He became interested in theatre during his junior year at the University of Alabama. While in college, he played Queequeg in a stage adaptation of the novel Moby Dick, the title role in Othello, Hud in Hair, and Joe in Show Boat.

Luwoye received his B.A. from the University of Alabama in 2013, and moved to New York in September that year.

== Acting career ==
=== Regional and off-Broadway ===
In regional theatre, Luwoye has performed in Cardboard Piano (Actors Theatre of Louisville, 2016), Marley (Center Stage, 2015), Witness Uganda (American Repertory Theater, 2014), Tick, Tick... Boom! (American Theater Group), and The Three Musketeers and Once on This Island (Flat Rock Playhouse).

Luwoye's off-Broadway stage debut was in the Second Stage Theater production of Invisible Thread, for which he received a 2016 Lucille Lortel Award nomination for Outstanding Lead Actor in a Musical.

=== Hamilton ===
In 2016, Luwoye auditioned for the role of Hercules Mulligan in the Broadway production of Hamilton, but unexpectedly was offered the title role. He began rehearsals June 14, 2016, and took over on August 2, 2016, as the alternate to Javier Muñoz for the role of Alexander Hamilton, following Lin-Manuel Miranda's departure from the show. Luwoye became the first black actor to take on the role of Hamilton.

He was also the understudy for the role of Aaron Burr, which he first performed two months later, on October 4, 2016. On November 16, 2016, Luwoye notably played Hamilton in the matinee before playing Burr in the evening performance.

Luwoye was given the title role in Hamilton's national touring company, beginning in March 2017 with a 21-week engagement in San Francisco, followed by 21 weeks in Los Angeles, concluding at the Pantages Theatre on December 30, 2017.

Luwoye returned to Broadway in the title role of Hamilton on January 16, 2018. His last performance was February 17, 2019.

=== Television ===
In November 2017, Luwoye appeared in an episode of Curb Your Enthusiasm called "The Shucker", in which he was shown playing the role of Alexander Hamilton in Hamilton. Additionally, he played Hades in an episode of The Magicians on SYFY.

In September 2018, he was signed for a guest voice role in the third season of Disney Junior's animated series The Lion Guard as Askari, the founder and leader of the original Lion Guard. In October 2018, Luwoye appeared in The Gifted as Erg.

In 2019, he was cast in a supporting role on NBC's Bluff City Law.

== Theatre credits ==
Year	Production	Role	Venue	Dates	Category
2011	Moby Dick	Queequeg	Marian Gallaway Theatre	February 2011	Regional
2011	Big River	Jim	Marian Gallaway Theatre	April 2011	Regional
2011	Once on This Island	Ton Ton	Flat Rock Playhouse	June 2011	Regional
2011	Hairspray	Duane/Ensemble	Flat Rock Playhouse	July 20 – August 14, 2011	Regional
2011	City of Angels	Stone	Allen Bales Theatre	November 7–13, 2011	Regional
2012	Side Man	Jonesy	Marian Gallaway Theatre	October 15–21, 2012	Regional
2012	Guys and Dolls	Ensemble	Flat Rock Playhouse	July 25 – August 19, 2012	Regional
2013	Othello	Othello	Marian Gallaway Theatre	February 2013	Regional
2013	Jubilee: Songs of and About Alabama	Ensemble	George C. Meyer Performing Arts Center	June 2013	Regional
2013	The Three Musketeers	Debris	Flat Rock Playhouse	November 2013	Regional
2014	Empty House	Sebastian	New York International Fringe Festival	August 9–24, 2014	Regional
2014	Fable	Richie	New York Musical Theatre Festival	July 22–27, 2014	Regional
2014	Witness Uganda	Jacob	American Repertory Theater	February 4, 2014 – March 16, 2014	Regional
2015	Marley	Peter Tosh	Center Stage	May 6 – June 14, 2015	Regional
2015	Tick, Tick... Boom!	Michael	Union County Performing Arts Center	January 28 – February 8, 2015	Regional
2015	Invisible Thread	Jacob	Second Stage Theater	October 21 – December 27, 2015	Off-Broadway
2016	Cardboard Piano	Soldier / Paul	Victor Joy Theatre	March 25 – April 10, 2016	Regional
2016	Hamilton	Alexander Hamilton (alt.) / Aaron Burr (understudy)	Richard Rodgers Theatre	August 2, 2016 – February 14, 2017	Broadway
2017	Hamilton	Alexander Hamilton	Orpheum Theatre	March 23 – August 5, 2017	National Tour
2017	Hamilton	Alexander Hamilton	Pantages Theatre	August 11 – December 30, 2017	National Tour
2018	Hamilton	Alexander Hamilton	Richard Rodgers Theatre	January 16, 2018 – February 16, 2019	Broadway
2022	Mandela	Nelson Mandela	Young Vic Theatre	November 30, 2022 - February 4, 2023	London
