= Cardboard Piano =

2016 play by Hansol Jung

- Written by: Hansol Jung
- Setting: Uganda - New Year's Eve 1999 and 2014

Premiere
- Date: March 25, 2016
- Place: Humana Festival of New American Plays, Louisville, Kentucky

Cardboard Piano is a 2016 American play by Hansol Jung. It premiered at the Humana Festival of New American Plays.

== Summary ==
Cardboard Piano begins on New Year's Eve 1999 in Northern Uganda. Chris, the daughter of American Christian missionaries, meets Adiel, a Ugandan teenager, secretly in her parents' church. The two have gathered to get married and they record their marriage vows on a tape recorder. They are interrupted by Pika, a thirteen-year-old child soldier running from his overseer. The girls tend to Pika, as his ear was recently cut off. Soon, a soldier arrives. Pika hides, but the encounter goes badly. Pika emerges from his hiding place and smashes the soldier's head in with a rock. Relieved to be alive, Chris and Adiel kiss. Believing homosexuality to be a sin, Pika shoots and kills Adiel.

The second act takes place in 2014 in the same church as Act 1. Paul, a Ugandan pastor, and his wife Ruth are celebrating their wedding anniversary. Chris arrives to visit the church her parents built and bury her father's ashes there. As Ruth tells Chris about her husband and eventually reveals that Paul is Pika. Paul and Chris argue but are interrupted by the arrival of Francis, a young gay man whom Paul has turned away from the church for his homosexuality. They all fight, leading to Paul leaving the church. The next morning, Ruth returns the wedding tape from 1999, which Pika has kept, to Chris before she leaves the country.

== Characters ==
- Christina "Chris" Englewood - a sixteen-year-old white American
- Adiel Nakalinzi - a sixteen-year-old Ugandan girl
- Pika - a child soldier
- Soldier
- Paul - a pastor, later revealed to be Pika, grown-up
- Ruth - Paul's wife
- Francis - a young gay man

Jung specifies that Adiel and Ruth, Francis and Pika, and Paul and Soldier should be played by the same actor.

== Development ==
Jung wrote Cardboard Piano during a residency at the Eugene O'Neill Theater Center's National Playwrights Conference. She was inspired to write the play after 2013 news stories about Joseph Kony as well as Uganda's anti-homosexuality legislature passed in that year.

== Production history ==
Cardboard Piano premiered on March 25, 2016 Humana Festival of New American Plays in Louisville, Kentucky. It was directed by Leigh Silverman and starred Briana Pozner as Chris, Nike Kadri as Adiel and Ruth, Jamar Williams as Pika, and Michael Luwoye as Paul.

In 2018, Jacole Kitchen directed the West Coast premiere of Cardboard Piano with Diversionary Theatre in San Diego. The play was also put on by Park Square Theatre in St. Paul, Minnesota. In May of the same year, Caryn Desai directed it at the International City Theater. In 2019, the play was performed with TimeLine Theatre in Chicago under the direction of Mechelle Moe. Later that year, Benny Sato Ambush directed Cardboard Piano at the New Repertory Theatre in Watertown, Massachusetts.
