= Basil Twist =

American puppeteer

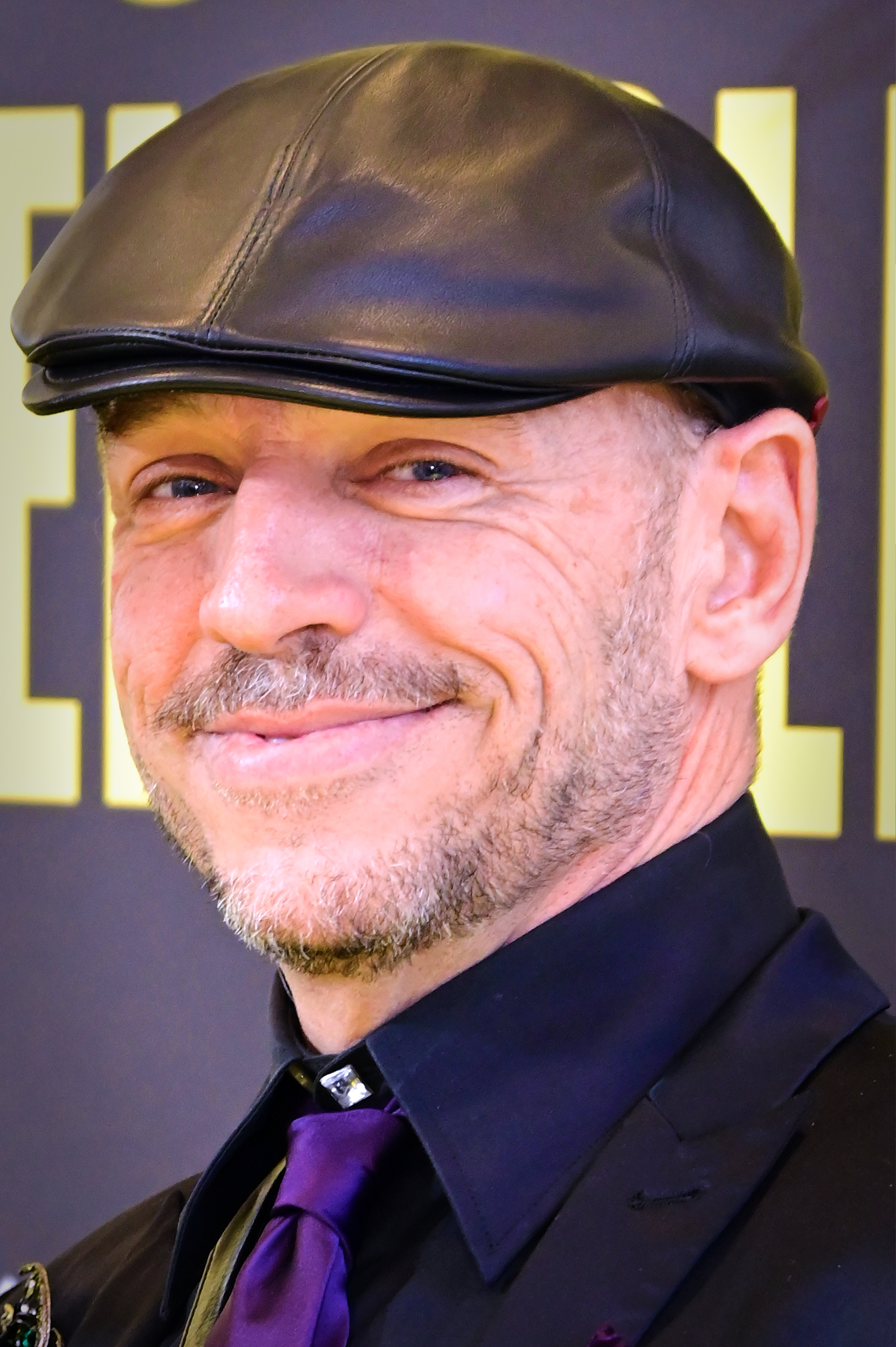
- Twist in 2026
- Born: 28 June 1969 (age 57); San Francisco, California
- Occupations: Director, puppeteer
- Website: basiltwist.com

Basil Twist is a New York City-based puppeteer who is known for his underwater puppet show, "Symphonie Fantastique". He was named a MacArthur Fellowship recipient on September 29, 2015.

== Personal life and work ==
Originally from San Francisco, Basil Twist is a third generation puppeteer. He graduated from the École Supérieure Nationale des Arts de la Marionnette in Charleville-Mézières, France. He is founder and director of the Dream Music Puppetry Program at Here Arts Center in NYC, which supports and produces new puppet artists. He was a Fall 2015 MacArthur Fellow at the NYU Center for Ballet and the Arts.

Twist has significantly contributed to the art of puppetry since 1998. He creates puppet works focused on their integration with music. His Symphonie Fantastique, is performed to the symphony of the same name. Twist's version of Master Peter's Puppet Show was created with the Eos Orchestra and later performed with the Los Angeles Philharmonic Orchestra. Twist's "Dogugaeshi" features original shamisen compositions created and performed live by master musician Yumiko Tanaka. He also directed and designed Humperdinck's opera, Hansel and Gretel, for the Houston Grand Opera and the Atlanta Opera. In 2010, Twist created the puppetry for the Broadway productions of The Pee-wee Herman Show and The Addams Family. Twist is known for his original adult puppet mediums and use of abstraction in puppetry. "Symphonie Fantastique" takes place in a tank of water. In "Red Beads", his collaboration with Lee Breuer and Mabou Mines, he created wind puppetry. In "Dogugaeshi" he uses the Japanese art form of sliding screens.

Other works include La Bella Dormente nel Bosco, Petrushka, Hansel and Gretel, Master Peter's Puppet Show, the Araneidae Show, Behind the Lid, and Arias with a Twist, among others. He has collaborated with such artists as Joey Arias, Lee Breuer, Kate Bush, Pilobolus, Paula Vogel and Joe Goode.

He is considered an important theater artist by critics at The New York Times, The New Yorker, et al. He has received national and regional recognition through numerous awards, including a Rome Prize from the American Academy in Rome, an Obie Award, a Creative Capital Award in the discipline of Performing Arts and a Guggenheim fellowship, and his work has been presented internationally.

In 2006, he had a solo exhibition at the Lisa Dent Gallery in San Francisco, CA.

In 2022, it was announced that Twist was leading the puppetry in the Royal Shakespeare Company adaptation of My Neighbor Totoro at the Barbican Theatre, London.

Twist is openly gay and married to Broadway dancer Ken Ard.
