= Faye Driscoll =

American dancer, choreographer and director

- Born: Faye Driscoll; November 22, 1975 (age 50); Venice Beach, CA
- Occupations: Choreographer, Director
- Awards: Bessie Award
- Website: fayedriscoll.com

Faye Driscoll is an American dancer, choreographer, and director. Her works have been presented throughout the United States and around the world. On Broadway, Driscoll choreographed Young Jean Lee's play Straight White Men. Driscoll also choreographed Josephine Decker's film Madeline's Madeline.

== Style ==
As an artist, Faye's goal is to be somebody in a world of "somebodies". Through choreography, she expresses interaction between others, comedy, humility and love. Faye intertwines choreography with traditional studio art as she makes dances that are mistaken for installations. Her choreography has also been seen as written plays rather than dance. Many of her performances include verbal elements as well as extensive use of props, that break away from the "real world" and focus more on fantasy. The viewer is placed on a rollercoaster as they view the performance, emotions such as joy, outrage, and discomfort are expected in a singular viewing. There is a sense of closeness and separation throughout her choreographed performances. Faye truly wants to surprise the viewer in what they expected from her choreography.

== Thank You for Coming ==
Made up of three installments, Thank You For Coming explores "the question of why we come together to make and watch live art now." The first part, Attendance premiered in 2014 at Danspace Project. Play premiered in the 2016 Next Wave Festival. Space, which featured Driscoll alone, rather than with the ensemble of the first two pieces, premiered in 2019.

== Honors and awards ==
Driscoll has been called "a startlingly original talent" by the New York Times. Her work has been presented at institutions such as Brooklyn Academy of Music, Danspace Project, Dance Theater Workshop, Wexner Center for the Arts, MCA Chicago, ICA Boston, Walker Art Center, Jacob's Pillow Dance Festival, and others.

- 2008-2019 Greenwall Foundation Grant Support
- 2009 New York Dance and Performance "Bessie" Award for Outstanding Production for 837 Venice Boulevard
- 2011 Jerome Foundation Grant for notnot (working title)
- 2011 New England Foundation for the Arts, National Dance Project Production Grant for You're Me
- 2012 Jerome Foundation Grant for Thank You for Coming
- 2013 Creative Capital Performing Arts Grant for Thank You for Coming
- 2013 John Simon Guggenheim Memorial Foundation Fellowship
- 2013 Foundation for Contemporary Arts Grants to Artists Award
- 2013-2015 Lower Manhattan Cultural Council Extended Life Residency
- 2014 Bogliasco Foundation Fellowship
- 2014 MAP Fund Grant for Thank You For Coming: PLAY
- 2015 French American Cultural Exchange (FACE) Foundation, French-US Exchange in Dance (FUSED) Grant for Thank You for Coming: Attendance
- 2015 Jerome Foundation Grant for Thank You For Coming: Play and Thank You For Coming: Space
- 2015 New England Foundation for the Arts, National Dance Project Production Residencies for Dance Grant for Thank You For Coming: Play
- 2015 New England Foundation for the Arts, National Dance Project Production Grant for Thank You For Coming: Play
- 2016 United States Artists Doris Duke Fellowship
- 2016 Doris Duke Artist Award
- 2018 Jacob's Pillow Dance Festival Dance Award

== Works and Performances ==
- Maybe You Could (Brooklyn Arts Exchange, 2005)
- Cold Blooded Old Time (Brooklyn Arts Exchange, 2005)
- You Should Dance To Music (Catch 19 at Galapagos Art Space, 2006)
- Loneliness (Brooklyn Arts Exchange, 2006)
- Eyes Eyes Eyes (Brooklyn Arts Exchange, 2006)
- Wow Mom, Wow (Dance New Amsterdam, 2007)
- 837 Venice Boulevard (HERE Arts Center, 2008)
- There is so much mad in me (Dance Theater Workshop, 2010)
- You're Me (The Kitchen, 2012)
- Thank You For Coming: Attendance (Danspace Project, 2014)
- Thank You For Coming: Play (Wexner Center for the Arts, 2016)
