= Arias with a Twist =

- Promotional poster from the original production.
- Original language: English
- Written by: Joey Arias; Basil Twist
- Characters: Joey
- Mute: Six Puppeteers
- Genre: Comedy
- Setting: Outer Space; Earth; HERE Arts Center; Hell; New York City

Premiere
- Date: June 12, 2008
- Place: HERE Arts Center, New York City
- ariaswithatwistreturns.com

Arias with a Twist is a 2008 American collaborative play created by drag queen Joey Arias and puppeteer Basil Twist. It premiered on June 12, 2008 at the HERE Arts Center in the Dorothy B. Williams Theatre. Although the play is performed as a one man show starring Arias, it also features the work of six nearly invisible puppeteers who manipulate traditional marionettes, hand puppets, and the scenic elements. It has been nominated for the 2009 Drama Desk Award for Unique Theatrical Experience.

== Plot ==
The play opens with a musical band of four marionettes, each playing an instrument; piano, drums, trumpet, and bass. After a brief song, the audience is introduced to Joey Arias. Arias has been kidnapped by aliens and is subjected to probing while she performs a version of Kashmir by Led Zeppelin. When the aliens are finished with the intrusion, they eject her from their spaceship and she crash lands in a jungle, presumably on earth. She follows her landing with Jungle of Eden, an original song by the Propellerheads' Alex Gifford. Alone and hungry, Arias searches for food only to find a mushroom that causes her to hallucinate. During the hallucination sequence, psychedelic imagery is projected onto a scrim at the front of the stage while Arias sings a Beatles medley comprising Lucy in the Sky with Diamonds and Within You, Without You. The scene shifts to an undisclosed location where objects float through the air accompanied by Arias's monologue on her sugar daddy. She is then sent to Hell, where she performs a musical number and some suggestive activities with two giant anatomically correct male devil puppets. Arias sings the Eric Carmen song All By Myself and is confronted by her doppelganger in puppet form who inspires her to return to New York City. This prompts another original Alex Gifford song, Lately. When Arias returns to New York, she arrives just in time to perform in a show with the aforementioned puppet band where she sings the Lambert, Hendricks & Ross song, Twisted, the Bill Carey and Carl T. Fischer song, You've Changed, and Ziegfeld Follies song, You've Gotta Pull Strings. The production ends in a Busby Berkeley-esque finalé, which includes mirrors and kaleidoscopic video images of Arias's face.

== Original cast ==
- Joey Arias
- Oliver Dalzell
- Randy Ginsburg
- Kirsten Kammermeyer
- Matt Leabo
- Jessica Scott
- Lindsay Abromaitis Smith

== Original creative team ==
- Director: Basil Twist
- Lighting Designer: Ayumu Poe Saegusa
- Sound Designer: Greg Duffin
- Projection Designer: Daniel Brodie
- Costume Concepts: Thierry Mugler
- Costume Designer: Chris March
- Musical Arrangements: Eliot Douglass and Jean Houle Francoise
- Original Songs: Alex Gifford
- Stage Manager: Neelam Vaswani
- Producers: Barbara Busackino, Here's Dream Music Puppetry Program, Tandem Otter Productions, and Johnnie Moore
