= Invisible Thread (musical) =

Witness Uganda
- (previously titled Invisible Thread)
- Music: Matt Gould; Griffin Matthews
- Lyrics: Matt Gould; Griffin Matthews
- Book: Matt Gould; Griffin Matthews
- Productions: 2014 Cambridge (as Witness Uganda); 2015 Second Stage Theatre (as Invisible Thread); 2019 Los Angeles (as Witness Uganda)

Witness Uganda (previously titled Invisible Thread) is a musical with book, music, and lyrics by Matt Gould and Griffin Matthews. It was based on the true story of Matthews' humanitarian trips to Uganda, and his work to fund his nonprofit organization, Uganda Project. The musical premiered under the title Witness Uganda on February 4, 2014, at Cambridge's American Repertory Theater, and ran through March 16, 2014. Under the title Invisible Thread, the show transferred to off-Broadway's Second Stage Theatre in a production which ran during December 2015.

The show returned to its original title of Witness Uganda for a February 2019 run at the Wallis Annenberg Center for the Performing Arts in Los Angeles.

== Synopsis ==
The American Repertory Theatre wrote:

When Griffin, a young man from New York City, volunteers for a project in Uganda, he finds himself on a journey that will change his life forever. Inspired by a true story, this rousing new musical, staged by Tony Award-winning director and A.R.T. Artistic Director Diane Paulus, exposes the challenges confronted by American aid workers and the complex realities of trying to change the world.

The story was based on Matthews' experience in Uganda, as well as Gould's Peace Corps experience in Mauritania and other similar experiences.

== Production history ==
The idea and creation for the musical began in 2008 when Gould and Matthews needed money for their non-profit organisation The Uganda Project. Gould recorded Matthews ranting about his frustrations and how they could not raise money for the non-profit. Gould composed music and incorporated it with the recording, beginning their project.

Gould and Matthews initially performed the show by themselves to raise funds for The Uganda Project. They were invited to perform at TEDx and Disney ASCAP. During their Disney ASCAP performance, they were able to impress the composer/lyricist Stephen Schwartz, who composed notable musicals such as Wicked. Gould said of the experience, "The show was a mess at that time, but we knew what the heart of it was."

Gould and Matthews brought in additional members of the creative team, who also had foreign aid experience. Choreographer Darrell Grand Moultrie previously taught dance in South Africa and the interns hired, mostly from Harvard University, had volunteering experience in Indonesia, Tanzania, and Uganda.

=== Original production ===
The show premiered under the title Witness Uganda on February 4, 2014, at the American Repertory Theater. The show was directed by Diane Paulus, with Shira Milikowsky as the associate director.

Production Team
Production	Member
Choreography	Darrell Grand Moultrie
Set design	Tom Pye
Costume design	Esosa
Lighting design	Maruti Evans
Sound design	Jonathan Deans
Projection design	Peter Nigrini
Music supervision, orchestrations, and vocal arrangements	Matt Gould
Music direction	Remy Kurs
Electronic music design	Jeff Marder, Brian Li

Band
Instrument	Member
Conductor/Keyboard 1	Matt Gould
Keyboard 2	Brian Li
Viola	Andrew Griffin
Drums	Nathan V. Terry
Guitar	Charlie Chronopoulos
Bass	Jonny Morrow
Percussion	Senfuab Stoney

The show starred Griffin Matthews as Griffin, Michael Luwoye as Jacob, Adeola Role as Joy, Emma Hunton as Ryan, Nicolette Robinson as Eden, Kristolyn Lloyd as Grace, Jamar Williams as Ibrahim, Tyrone Davis Jr. as Ronny, and the ensemble of Melody Betts, Rodrick Covington, Kevin Curtis, LaTrisa Harper, Aisha Jackson, and Jamard Richardson.

=== Later productions ===
The musical came to Diane Paulus' attention after it won the 2012 Richard Rodgers Award for Musical Theater. She was impressed and noted it was like nothing she ever heard or read before. While she was working on Pippin at the American Repertory Theater, Schwartz mentioned there was a musical about Uganda that would interest her. The musical later won the Richard Rodgers Award for Musical Theater again in 2014.

Under the direction of Diane Paulus, the show had a staged reading on October 23 and 24, 2014. The cast included Julius Thomas III, Adeola Role, Adam Kantor, Michael Luwoye, Kristolyn Lloyd, Nicolette Robinson, Jamar Williams, Tyrone Davis Jr., Amber Iman, Aisha Jackson, LaTrisa Harper, Rodrick Covington, Kevin Curtis and Jamard Richardson.

The title was changed to Invisible Thread in 2015, for a production at the Second Stage Theatre. Previews began on October 31, 2015, and it officially opened on December 2, 2015. It closed in late December 2015.

== Musical numbers ==
2015 off-Broadway (Second Stage Theatre)

Act I

- "All Are Welcome" – Company
- "Kyussa" – Company
- "To The Hill" – Company
- "Beautiful" - Griffin, Ibahim, Eden, Grace, Ronny, Ensemble
- "Invisible Thread" – Griffin & Ryan
- "I Have a Lover" – Griffin & Jacob
- "The Library" – Company
- "Put It All on the Line" – Company
- "Weeds" – Jacob & Ensemble
- "New World" – Company

Act II

- "Internet Song" – Griffin, Ryan, Ibrahim, Eden, Jacob, Grace, Ronny
- "Bricks" – Company
- "If I Could Turn Around" – Griffin, Ryan & Company
- "Phone Call Delay" – Griffin, Ryan, Ibrahim, Eden, Grace, Ronny
- "Bela Musana" – Company
- "I'd Cross the Blue" – Ensemble
- "Fragile" – Company
- "Njakuangula" – Company

== Casts ==
Role	Original A.R.T. Cast	Original Off-Broadway Cast	Original Studio Recording Cast
Griffin	Griffin Matthews	Griffin Matthews / Jeremy Pope*	Griffin Matthews
Ryan	Emma Hunton	Corey Mach	Emma Hunton
Ronny	Tyrone Davis Jr.	Tyrone Davis Jr.	Tyrone Davis Jr.
Grace	Kristolyn Lloyd	Kristolyn Lloyd	Kristolyn Lloyd
Jacob	Michael Luwoye	Michael Luwoye	Kameron Richardson
Eden	Nicolette Robinson	Nicolette Robinson	Nicolette Robinson
Joy	Adeola Role	Adeola Role	Cynthia Erivo
Ibrahim	Jamar Williams	Jamar Williams	Jamar Williams
Rain Lady	(did not exist)	Melody Betts	Ledisi
Ensemble	Melody Betts, Aisha Jackson, Latrisa Harper, Kevin Curtis, Jamard Richardson, Rodrick Covington	Jason Herbert, Aisha Jackson, Latrisa Harper, Kevin Curtis, Jamard Richardson, Rodrick Covington	

* Jeremy Pope played the role of Griffin at certain performances
