= The Romance of Magno Rubio =

- Original language: English
- Written by: Lonnie Carter

Premiere
- Date: October, 2002
- Place: Ma-Yi Theater Company

The Romance of Magno Rubio is a play by Lonnie Carter based on a short story by Carlos Bulosan. Developed by the Ma-Yi Theater Company, it had its premiere in October, 2002 in New York City. The production, cast members and writers were the recipients of eight (8) special 2003 Obie Awards, the prestigious off and off-Broadway awards given annually by the Village Voice.

There have been subsequent productions at New Haven's Long Wharf Theatre, Chicago's Victory Gardens Theater, the Cultural Center of the Philippines in Manila, Laguna Playhouse, the International Theater Festival in Bucharest and Sibiu, Romania and numerous cities around the world. In 2007 it opened the Asian-American Theater Festival at the Culture Project in New York and the Latino-American Festival at the Los Angeles Theater Center. Most recently, Magno was seen in Los Angeles in two productions at the Ford Amphitheatre in both the English and Tagalog languages. The same actor, Jon Jon Briones, played Magno in both languages and was roundly acclaimed. In November Magno will be in Singapore as the premiere production of the new Entablado Theater Company (ETC). Magno the Movie is being written for a shooting in 2013 by Lonnie Carter and Charles Uy, the director/producer. Plans for a production by Chinese Pirate Productions were in the works for 2013.

Based on an eight-page short story by Bulosan, the play is largely told in rhymed couplets, and uses various traditional Filipino art forms, such as eskrima to tell the story of a lovesick migrant farmworker entranced by a tall blonde white woman in the hills of Arkansas who's out to take him for everything he's worth.
