= Leigh Silverman =

American director

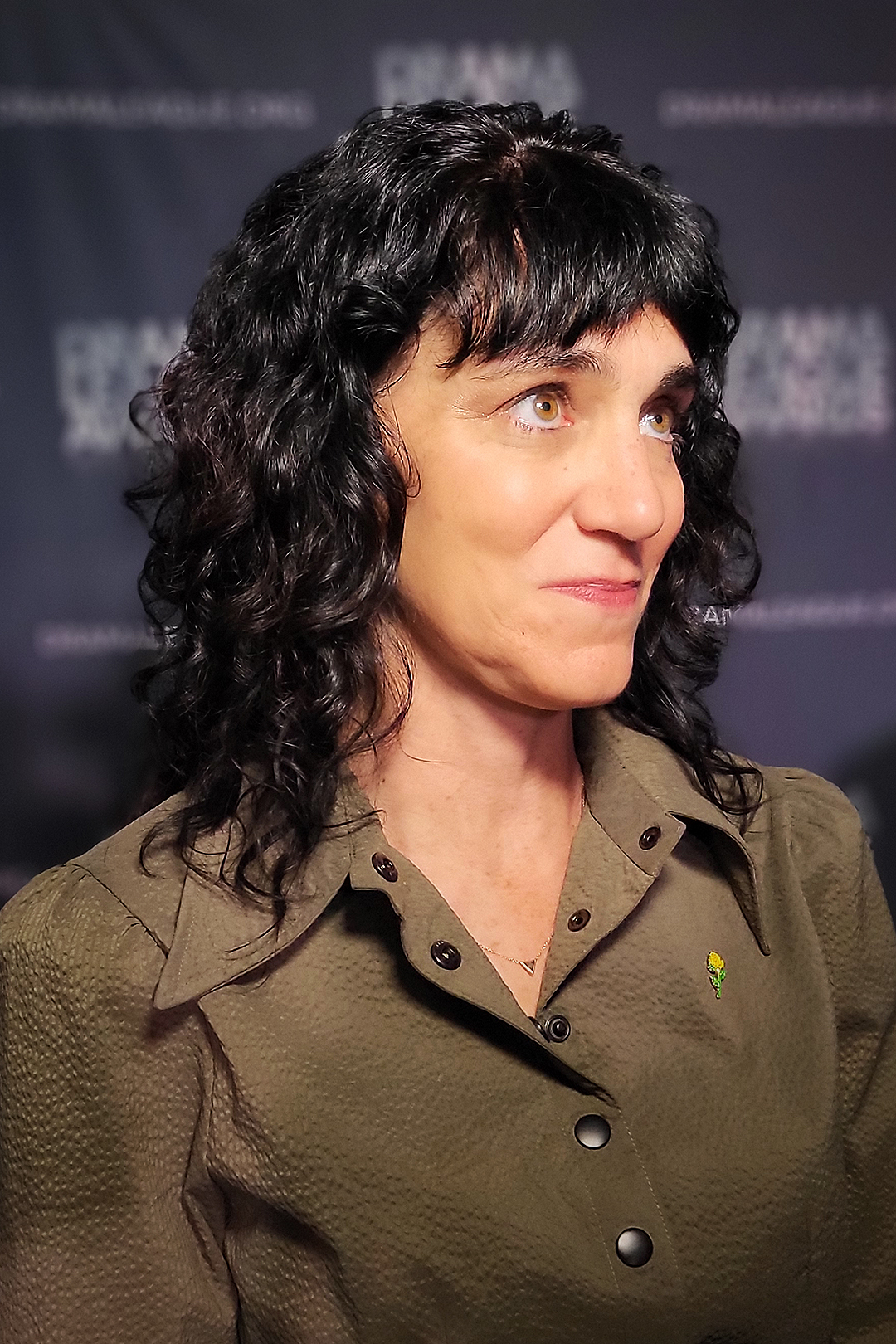
- Silverman in 2022
- Born: December 18, 1974 (age 51); Rockville, Maryland, U.S.
- Education: Carnegie Mellon University (BFA), (MFA)
- Occupation: Director

Leigh Silverman is an American director for the stage, both off-Broadway and on Broadway. She was nominated for the 2014 and 2024 Tony Award for Best Direction of a Musical for the musicals Violet and Suffs, and the 2008 Drama Desk Award for Outstanding Director of a Play for the play From Up Here.

== Biography ==
=== Early life ===
Silverman was born in Rockville, Maryland on December 18, 1974, went to high school in Washington, D.C., and attended Carnegie Mellon University, earning a BFA in Directing and an MFA in Playwriting.

Upon graduation, she had an internship at the New York Theatre Workshop. Silverman said "I can say, without a doubt, that most, if not all, of my important theatrical relationships came out of my time with New York Theater Workshop."

=== Career ===
Silverman directed the Lisa Kron play Well off-Broadway at The Public Theater; the play ran from March 2004 to May 2004. She also directed Well on Broadway in 2006. Among other awards, the play was nominated for the Outer Critics Circle Award, Outstanding Off-Broadway Play. She directed Kron's play In the Wake in its premiere engagement at the Kirk Douglas Theatre in Los Angeles, California in March 2010. She directed In the Wake at the Public Theater in November 2010.

She has directed many plays off-Broadway, including Blue Door by Tanya Barfield in 2006 at Playwrights Horizons, for which she was nominated for the Audelco Award, Best Director. The New York Times reviewer wrote that the play was "directed with care by Leigh Silverman." She directed From Up Here, by Liz Flahive at The Manhattan Theatre Club's off-Broadway City Center Stage I in 2008 and received a 2008 Drama Desk Award nomination for Outstanding Director of a Play. She directed David Greenspan's Go Back to Where You Are at the off-Broadway Playwrights Horizons' Peter Jay Sharp Theater, opening in March 2011. She received the 2011 Obie Award, as director, for Go Back to Where You Are and In the Wake.

On Broadway, she was the Associate Director for the musical Never Gonna Dance in 2003. She directed Chinglish by David Henry Hwang at the Goodman Theatre, Chicago in June to July 2011 and on Broadway in October 2011. She was nominated for the Joseph Jefferson Awards as Director of the Goodman Theatre production of Chinglish.

Silverman directed the premiere of Hansol Jung's Cardboard Piano at the 2016 Humana Festival of New American Plays in Louisville, Kentucky. She directed the revival of the musical Violet on Broadway for the Roundabout Theatre Company in 2013 and received a Tony Award nomination as Best Director. The USA Today reviewer wrote that the musical was "quietly affecting and lovingly staged by director Leigh Silverman."

Silverman directed Bright Half Life, a new play by Tanya Barfield at the off-Broadway Women's Project Theatre in February 2015. This was the third time Silverman and Barfield had worked together. She previously directed Barfield's The Call in 2013 and Blue Door in 2006.

She directed the world premiere of the Neil LaBute play The Way We Get By at the off-Broadway Second Stage Theatre, which opened on May 19, 2015, and closed on June 21. The cast starred Thomas Sadoski and Amanda Seyfried. She directed the Encores! Off-Center production of Andrew Lippa's The Wild Party in July 2015, starring Sutton Foster and Steven Pasquale. She directed another LaBute play, All the Ways to Say I Love You, which ran off-Broadway from September 28, 2016 to October 23, 2016 and starred Judith Light in this solo play.

She directed the off-Broadway revival of the musical Sweet Charity, which started at the Pershing Square Signature Center on November 2, 2016 (previews) and ran through December 23. The musical starred Sutton Foster.

For the Roundabout Theatre's Underground, she directed On the Exhale by Martin Zimmerman, which premiered off-Broadway at the Harold and Miriam Steinberg Center for Theatre on February 7, 2017 (previews), and ran through April 2. This one-woman play starred Marin Ireland.

In 2017 she also directed the world premiere of Hurricane Diane by Madeleine George at the Two River Theater in New Jersey. The cast included Mia Barron (Sandy Fleischer), Becca Blackwell (Diane), Nikiya Mathis (Renee Shapiro-Epps), Danielle Skraastad (Pam Annunziata) and Kate Wetherhead (Beth Wann). In September of the same year, Silverman directed the world premiere of Hansol Jung's Wild Goose Dreams at La Jolla Playhouse in San Diego.

In 2018, for the Minetta Lane Theatre she directed the monologue Harry Clarke by David Cale with Billy Crudup in the title role.

She directed the world premiere of David Henry Hwang's musical Soft Power at the Ahmanson Theatre in from May to June 2018. The production was presented by Center Theatre Group in association with East West Players, and featured music by Jeanine Tesori as well as choreography by Sam Pinkleton.

In 2022, Silverman was featured in the book 50 Key Figures in Queer US Theatre, with a profile written by theatre scholar Bess Rowen. She also directed the Off-Broadway premiere of Suffs at The Public Theater, and its subsequent 2024 Broadway transfer, receiving nominations for the Tony Award for Best Direction of a Musical and Drama League Award for Outstanding Direction of a Musical.

Following Suffs, Silverman directed the Broadway production of Yellow Face for Roundabout Theatre Company's 2024-2025 season, returning to the play after having directed the 2007 off-Broadway production.

Silverman then directed the 2025 premiere of The Seat of Our Pants, premiering Off-Broadway at The Public Theater, an adaptation of Thornton Wilder's The Skin of Our Teeth. For her direction, she was nominated for the 2026 Drama Desk Award for Outstanding Director of a Musical and Drama League Award for Outstanding Direction of a Musical.

=== Awards and nominations ===
Year	Award	Category	Work	Result	Ref.
2007	Audelco Award	Director	Blue Door	Nominated	
2008	Drama Desk Award	Outstanding Director of a Play	From Up Here	Nominated	
2011	Obie Award	Distinguished Direction	In the Wake, Go Back to Where You Are	Won	
2014	Tony Award	Best Direction of a Musical	Violet	Nominated	
2022	Drama League Award	Outstanding Direction of a Musical	Suffs	Nominated	
2024	Tony Award	Best Direction of a Musical	Suffs	Nominated	
2026	Drama Desk Award	Outstanding Director of a Musical	The Seat of Our Pants	Pending	
2026	Drama League Award	Outstanding Direction of a Musical	The Seat of Our Pants	Pending	
