= HERE Arts Center =

Theatrical center in New York City

Coordinates: 40.72512°N 74.00483°W

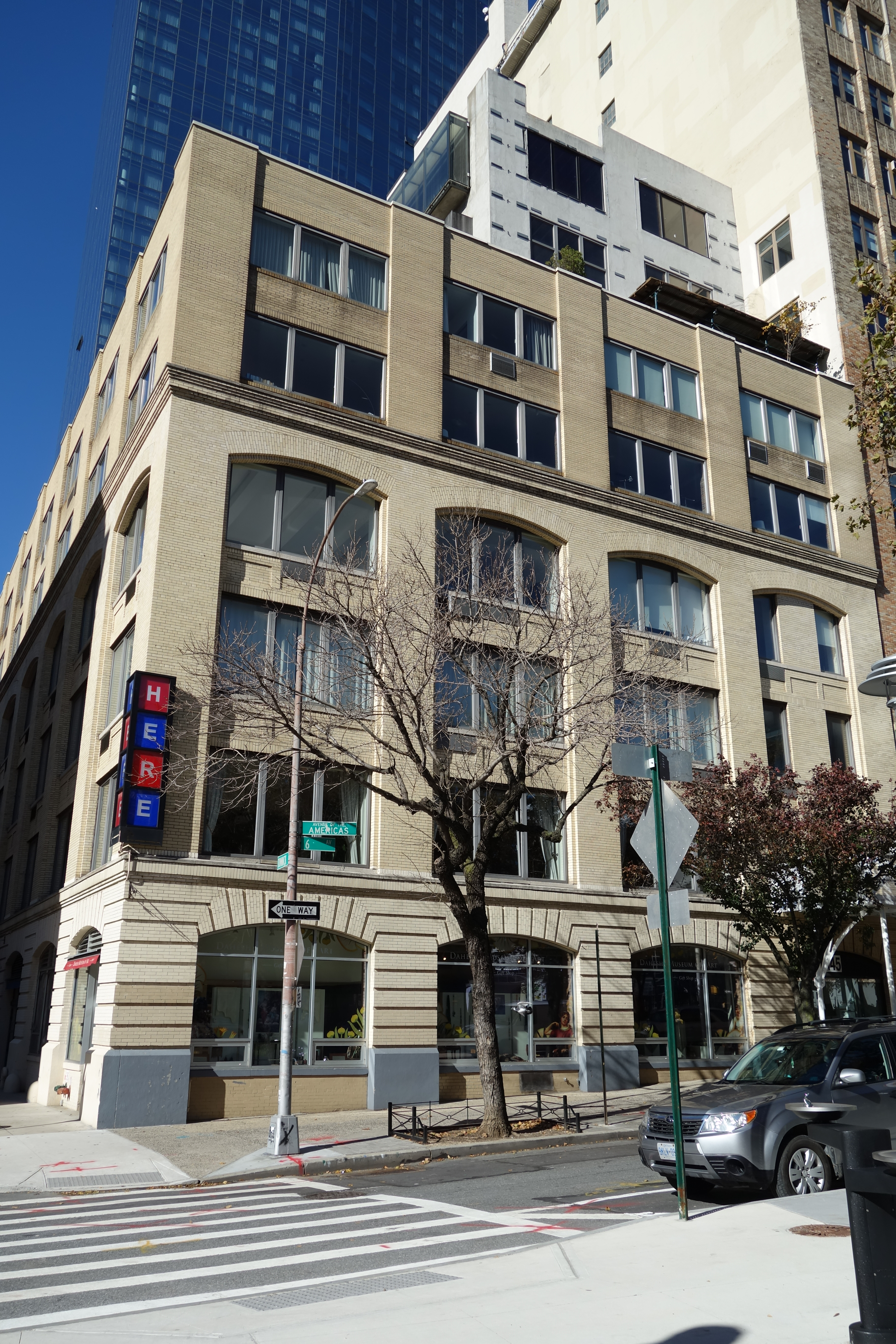
- Interactive map of HERE Arts Center
- Address: 145 Sixth Avenue; New York City; United States
- Capacity: Mainstage: 150; Dorothy B. Williams: 71
- Type: Off-off-Broadway
- Public transit: New York City Subway: at Spring Street; 1 and 2 at Houston Street; N, Q, R, and W at Prince St. NYCT Bus: M21, M6

Construction
- Opened: 1993

Website
- www.here.org

HERE Arts Center is a New York City off-off-Broadway producing and presenting venue, founded in 1993. Their location includes two stages specializing in hybrid performance, dance, theater, multi-media and puppetry in addition to art exhibition space and a cafe. Since 1993, HERE reports having supported over 15,000 artists and hosted over 1,000,000 audience members.

HERE is located in Hudson Square, Lower Manhattan, at 145 Avenue of the Americas, between Spring Street and Broome Street. In 2008 the space underwent extensive renovations which saw the venue take its current form.

== History ==
Founded in 1993, The New York Times said HERE "has produced innovative new theatrical work since it was founded". Examples include productions of Eve Ensler's The Vagina Monologues, Basil Twist's Symphonie Fantastique, and Young Jean Lee's Songs of the Dragons Flying to Heaven. Work produced and presented at HERE has garnered 16 OBIE awards, two OBIE grants for artistic achievement, a 2006 Edwin Booth Award ("for Outstanding Contribution to NY Theatre") from the CUNY Graduate Center, seven TONY nominations, six Drama Desk nominations, two Berrilla Kerr Awards, two Bessie awards, four NY Innovative Theatre Awards and two Pulitzer Prizes and one nomination and two MacArthur fellowships. In 2005, HERE purchased its long-time home and completed a complete renovation in 2008, all through a five-year, $5 million "Secure HERE's Future" campaign. There are two theatres, a cafe, gallery, and support spaces. In July 2025 HERE announced the appointment of Jesse Cameron Alick, Annalisa Dias, Lanxing Fu, and Lauren Miller as co-directors of the institution, succeeding founding artistic director Kristin Marting.

== Prototype Festival ==
January 2013 marked the launch of the PROTOTYPE Opera/Theater/Now festival featuring contemporary artists from around the world, co-produced with Beth Morrison Projects. The festival lasts for less than two weeks and works are staged at various venues around New York City. The 2021 Prototype Festival occurred in a digital format. The 2022 festival had planned to return in person but had to be cancelled due to Covid.

== Significant productions ==
- Eve Ensler's The Vagina Monologues
- Basil Twist's Symphonie Fantastique
- Hazelle Goodman's On Edge
- Young Jean Lee's Songs of the Dragons Flying to Heaven
- Faye Driscoll's 837 Venice Boulevard
- Basil Twist and Joey Arias's Arias with a Twist
- Mohammed Fairouz's Sumeida's Song
- 2016 world premiere of Hansol Jung's Among the Dead
