= Brian Quijada =

American actor, writer, and musician

- Born: 1988 (age 37–38); Chicago, Illinois, U.S.
- Education: University of Iowa (BFA)
- Occupations: Playwright; Composer; Actor

Brian Quijada is a Salvadoran-American actor, playwright, musician, and a solo performer, known for his multimedia theatrical works involving topics on immigration, humanity, identity, and American experience incorporated with Latinx childhood.

He wrote and starred in the 2025 musical, Mexodus, with Nygel D. Robinson. The 2026 Off-Broadway production received critical acclaim, winning Quijada two Drama Desk Awards, an Outer Critics Circle Award and a Lucille Lortel Award.

== Background ==
=== Family ===
Quijada was born to immigrant parents, Eduardo and Reina Quijada. He is the youngest of four brothers. His parents moved to the United States from El Salvador in the 1970s with their two children at the time, Fernando and Roberto. Quijada and his brother Marvin were born after the family moved to the United States. His father worked as a truck-driver and his mother worked in housekeeping. According to Quijada, his parents originally did not support his desire to be an artist and viewed it "more as a hobby." However, he explains that since pursuing acting as a career, his parents have become more supportive and attentive of his work.

Quijada identifies himself as Salvadoran-American. In an interview with Stage & Candor, Quijada said that he thinks his parents named him and his brother Brian and Marvin to give them "easier lives in the States." Quijada's brother, Marvin, is also an actor. The two brothers worked together on Quijada's play Kid Prince and Pablo.

=== Childhood and education ===
Quijada's family settled in a trailer park in Glenview, IL, which is where he lived as a young kid. The family later moved to a house in Highwood, IL, which Quijada explained as "a 'burb that's surrounded by a very affluent - I would say 70% Jewish town (Highland Park, IL)." Quijada attended middle school and high school in Highland Park, which he says was "a weird culture shock" coming from a less affluent family and background. He describes his upbringing as "moving around and new cultures, and a cultural explosion for me throughout my life." Quijada attended The University of Iowa as a Theatre and English major. He spent a year in Chicago after graduation and then moved to New York City, where he currently resides, to pursue a career as an actor, playwright, musician, and a solo performer.

=== Relationships ===
Quijada recently got married. He references his wife, who is Austrian and Swiss, in Where Did We Sit On The Bus.

== Career ==
=== Acting ===
Quijada performs in different fields, ranging from theatrical works, television, and voice over. He has stated a preference for acting in theatrical new work, which he discovered during his time at the University of Iowa while working on a new play development for Iowa's New Play Festival. After graduating from the University of Iowa, he took part in variety of theatre festivals all over the United States, such as The National Playwright's Conference, The Eugene O'Neill Theatre Center, The Kennedy Center's MFA Playwright's Festival, The Denver New Play Summit, The Lark, Seven Devil's Playwright's Conference, and La Jolla Playhouse, to promote his interest in new play development. Quijada has originated roles, and he has acted in Regional World Premieres as well as Off-Broadway work. He also has done voice over work for the advertising campaigns of companies like Jeep and McDonalds. He is a member of the Ensemble Studio Theatre in New York City.

=== Music ===
There is heavy use of hip-hop and looping in most of Quijada's works. Looping is a musical process that involves layering multiple sounds at once to create one finished composition. Quijada uses digital looping with the technology of iPhones and iPads, fusing this technique with multi-instrumentalism in his play Where Did We Sit On The Bus? Quijada has stated that he enjoys the hip-hop genre of music and incorporates it into his own work. He has named artists like Reggie Watts, John Leguizamo, Lin-Manuel Miranda, old silent comedians, and Cantinflas as some of his biggest influences.

Quijada's debut album featuring the live-looped soundtrack of Where Did We Sit On The Bus? was released on March 10, 2016. Seattle Repertory Theater recently hired him to write a new live-looped musical with playwright Hansol Jung. He is also the looper for his hip-hop duo, The Fantastic Boom, with Idris Goodwin.

=== Playwriting ===
Quijada wrote spoken poetry for much of his life, performing his own work at poetry slams in Chicago and eventually New York City. He often visited the Nuyorican Poet's Cafe there to perform his poetry. He was later introduced to playwriting by Chay Yew, the artistic director of Victory Gardens in Chicago, which led to him starting a workshop and the creation of Where Did We Sit on the Bus?. His playwrighting involves sounds of his childhood, such as Latin rhythms, hip hop, R&B, and 70's and 80's rock, often made live onstage with looped music, digital finger drumming, spoken word, clowning, and turntablism. These sounds are connected to the main themes of his works: his childhood and the search for his identity. He has worked as a writer-in-residence in The Kennedy Center and The Eugene O'Neil Theatre Center. He wrote plays like Where Did We Sit on the Bus?, Kid Prince and Pablo, Strip, and Til the DJ Quits Playing.

=== Educator ===
Quijada has taught at workshops and universities across the country, including KCATCF Region 7 (Pacific Northwest) and Region 3 (North Midwest), Western Washington University's Hip Hop Festival, Hunter College, Los Medanos College, Texas Tech University's Wild Wind Performance Lab, and The Kennedy Center. He teaches different aspects of theatre to students, including solo performance, verse writing, and theatrical looping.

== Works ==
=== Where Did We Sit on the Bus? ===
Quijada's first work, Where Did We Sit on the Bus?, derived from his childhood experience in the northern suburbs of Chicago, from a trailer park in Glenview to a house in Highwood. The title refers to a moment in his childhood during a 3rd grade history lesson about Rosa Parks. Referring to Latino and Latina people in US history, he asked his teacher, "Where did we sit on the bus?", to which she replied "They weren't around." Quijada talks about this experience in an interview with Stage & Candor, saying it "flipped [his] mind" and provoked his dissatisfaction with "the way that history is taught in the public school system."

The play starts with Quijada's question about his potential children's identity and how they will fit in the world with three different backgrounds: Salvadoran, Austrian, and Swiss. His story is told using looped rhythms, raps, songs, poems, and spoken-word pieces, in an attempt to find his identity. Past productions of the play were put on at Teatro Vista in association with Victory Gardens (World Premiere), Ensemble Studio Theatre, Boise Contemporary Theatre, Victory Gardens, and 1st Stage's Logan Festival. An upcoming production is set to take place in January 2019 at City Theatre in Pittsburgh.

=== Kid Prince and Pablo ===
Kid Prince and Pablo is a play that Quijada wrote for WildWind Performance Lab in Texas Tech University, where the university brings in established artists in the playwriting industry to serve as new play development and a way for the theater students to have conversations with and collaborate with professional artists. Quijada describes Kid Prince and Pablo as "a hip-hop, digital age, American adaptation of Mark Twain’s The Prince and the Pauper." The story takes place in the future of an alternate universe of America, where a king exists in the United States, and the people are mixed race, except the royal family, who remained white. The Prince is an aspiring rapper, while a poor pauper named Pablo, a Mexican boy, is a bucket drummer. When the two's worlds are altered, Pablo has technology he can use to make beats and become a producer, while the Prince questions the presence of poverty and mixed races. After his hardships, the Prince is able to actually rap about something as opposed to rap about a life of luxury.

The play explores themes of race, class, and the wealth divide in America. In addition to Texas Tech WildWind Performance Lab, it was developed at Vassar and New York Stage & Film's POWERHOUSE Festival and Ars Nova's Ant Festival. In October and November 2019, it received a commissioned production at Washington, D.C.'s Kennedy Center, under the direction of Pirronne Yousefzadeh.

=== Strip ===
Strip is Quijada's third play, which he also wrote for WildWind Performance Lab. It is a three-person play about a student named Fidel, who goes to college and meets his roommate Martin. Martin inspires Fidel to question his religion and the existence of God, and teaches him how to "strip" others of their religions as well. He uses this new-found ability to do the same thing to his new girlfriend, Sandra, and the rest of the play shows the resulting consequences of this. In an interview with Texas Tech School of Theatre and Dance, Quijada says that Strip is "a story about the boundaries of religion and the consequences of losing faith." Unlike Quijada's first two plays, Strip has no hip hop in it.

=== Til The DJ Quits Playing ===
Til The DJ Quits Playing is a short play that Quijada wrote for Missing Bolts Productions and NoPassport Theatre Alliance and Press. These two theatre action initiatives reached out to playwrights across the country to curate a collection of short, 3 to 5 minute works in response to the Pulse nightclub shooting in Orlando on June 12, 2016. The collection, made up of over 70 plays, was performed at theaters and universities across the country as a reading titled "After Orlando."

=== Mexodus ===
Quijada partned with Nygel D. Robinson in 2024 as writers and composers of the musical, Mexodus, which tells the story of African-Americans who traversed to Mexico on the Underground Railroad. The production premiered at Baltimore Center Stage in 2024, starring Quijada and Rmoobinson and directed by David Mendizábal. The show is notable for its use of live-looping, designed by sound designer Mikhail Fiksel.

The show later transferred to the Mosaic Theatre Company in Washington, D.C., and later Berkeley Repertory Theatre,. with the same team, before premiering Off-Broadway in 2025 at the Minetta Lane Theatre. Produced by P3 Productions and Audible, the show received universal acclaim, with praise for Quijada and Robinson's writing and performances, Mendizábal's direction and Fiksel's sound design. The show returned Off-Broadway in 2026 at the Daryl Roth Theatre. The show announced a U.S. national tour beginning in July 2026.

The production was nominated for nine Lucille Lortel Awards, winning Outstanding Musical, 10 Drama Desk Awards, winning three, two Drama League Awards and 10 Outer Critics Circle Awards, winning four including Outstanding New Off-Broadway Musical.

== Awards and nominations ==
Year	Award	Category	Work	Result	Ref.
2026	Jeff Award	Best New Play	Where Did We Sit On The Bus?	Nominated	
2026	Jeff Award	Outstanding Solo Performance	Where Did We Sit On The Bus?	Won	
2026	Jeff Award	Outstanding Sound Design	Where Did We Sit On The Bus?	Won	
2017	Drama Desk Award	Outstanding Solo Performance	Where Did We Sit On The Bus?	Nominated	
2017	Drama Desk Award	Outstanding Sound Design of a Play	Where Did We Sit On The Bus?	Nominated	
2018	The National Playwright's Conference		Kid Prince and Pablo	Nominated	
2026	Drama Desk Award	Outstanding Musical	Mexodus	Nominated	
2026	Drama Desk Award	Outstanding Lead Performance in a Musical	Mexodus	Nominated	
2026	Drama Desk Award	Outstanding Music	Mexodus	Won	
2026	Drama Desk Award	Outstanding Lyrics	Mexodus	Nominated	
2026	Drama Desk Award	Outstanding Book of a Musical	Mexodus	Won	
2026	Outer Critics Circle Award	Outstanding New Off-Broadway Musical	Mexodus	Nominated	
2026	Outer Critics Circle Award	Outstanding New Score	Mexodus	Won	
2026	Outer Critics Circle Award	Outstanding Book of a Musical	Mexodus	Nominated	
2026	Outer Critics Circle Award	Outstanding Lead Performer in an Off-Broadway Musical	Mexodus	Nominated	
2026	Outer Critics Circle Award	Outstanding Orchestrations	Mexodus	Nominated	
2026	Drama League Award	Outstanding Production of a Musical	Mexodus	Nominated	
2026	Drama League Award	Distinguished Performance	Mexodus	Nominated	
2026	Lucille Lortel Award	Outstanding Musical	Mexodus	Won	
2026	Lucille Lortel Award	Outstanding Lead Performer in a Musical	Mexodus	Nominated	
2026	Dorian Award	Outstanding Off-Broadway Production	Mexodus	Won	
