= Ralph B. Peña =

Filipino American playwright and theater director

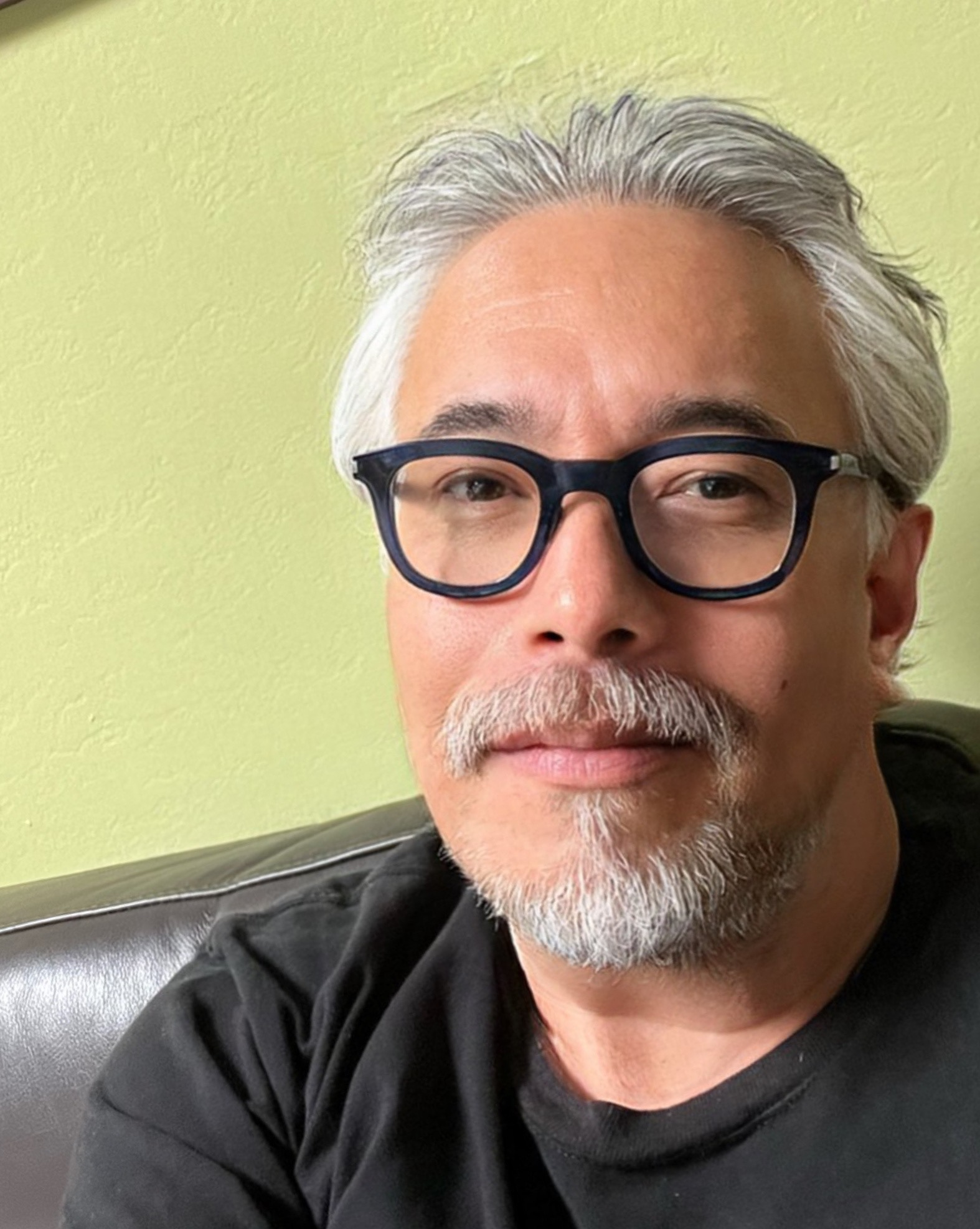
- Ralph B. Peña in 2022
- Born: Manila, Philippines
- Occupations: Playwright, theater director, arts administrator
- Years active: 1980s–present
- Awards: Obie Award – Special Citation (2003)

Ralph B. Peña is a Filipino American playwright, theater director, and arts administrator. He is a founding member and the producing artistic director of Ma-Yi Theater Company, an Off-Broadway company in New York City that develops and produces new works by Asian American playwrights. Peña was among the recipients of an Obie Award Special Citation in 2003 associated with Ma-Yi's production of The Romance of Magno Rubio.

== Early life and activism ==
Peña was born in Manila. In the early 1980s he took part in political street theater during the Marcos era with the University of the Philippines–based troupes UP Tropang Bodabil and, later, UP Peryante, where he served as an early chair. He later moved to the United States.

== Career ==
=== Ma-Yi Theater Company ===
Peña has been Ma-Yi’s artistic leader since the mid‑1990s. Ma‑Yi received a Special Drama Desk Award in 2010 “for more than two decades of excellence and for nurturing Asian‑American voices in stylistically varied and engaging theater.” The company established the Ma‑Yi Writers Lab in 2004; the Dramatists Guild has described it as the largest AAPI playwright collective in the United States.

=== Playwriting ===
Peña wrote Flipzoids (first produced in the 1990s), which has been the subject of academic analysis, and he supplied original Filipino (Tagalog) text for Ma‑Yi’s staging of Lonnie Carter’s The Romance of Magno Rubio (2002).

=== Directing ===
Peña’s directing credits include Off‑Broadway and regional productions:

- The Chinese Lady (Barrington Stage, Long Wharf Theater, Public Theater/Theater Row, 2022), by Lloyd Suh.
- Tiger Style! (South Coast Repertory, 2022), by Mike Lew.
- SUMO (La Jolla Playhouse/Ma-Yi, 2023, Public Theater/Anspacher, 2025), by Lisa Sanaye Dring (co‑production with Ma‑Yi).

Earlier in his career he directed Lloyd Suh's The Children of Vonderly (2007) and Michael Lew's Microcrisis (2010) for Ma-Yi.

== Awards ==
- Guggenheim Fellow in Drama and Performance Art (2026).
- Obie Award Special Citation (2003), shared with the artists recognized for The Romance of Magno Rubio.
- Filipino American National Historical Society (FANHS) Metro New York Lifetime Achievement Award (2016).

== See also ==
- Asian-American theatre
