= Ma-Yi Theater Company =

American theater company

- Formation: 1989
- Founders: Chito Jao Garces, Ralph Pena, Margot Lloren, Ankie Frilles, Luz de Leon, Isolda Oca, Arianne Recto, Cristina Sison, and Bernie Villanueva
- Type: Theatre group
- Location: New York City
- Artistic director: Ralph B. Peña
- Website: ma-yitheatre.org

Ma-Yi Theater Company is a professional, not-for-profit, Obie Award and Drama Desk Award-winning theater company based in New York City that was founded in 1989. Ma-Yi Theater is headed by executive director Jorge Ortoll and artistic director Ralph Peña.

== History ==
Ma-Yi did not start out to be an Asian-American theatre company. Founded in 1989 by Chito Jao Garces (artistic director), Ralph Pena, Margot Lloren, Ankie Frilles, Luz de Leon, Isolda Oca, Arianne Recto, Cristina Sison, and Bernie Villanueva, its first productions were Filipino and Filipino-American plays and adaptations. Also instrumental in the founding of Ma-Yi was Chris Millado, who served as advisor to their first performance and returned to write and direct for the group. Jorge Ortoll joined the company a year later in 1990, and became its executive director in 1991, the same year that Ma-Yi became a non-profit company and established a Board of Directors. Ralph Peña and Betty Mae Piccio became co-artistic directors in 1995, and when Piccio moved to Philadelphia in 1996, Peña became its sole artistic director. Ortoll and Peña have since organized a support staff that has included Lourdes Obillo as accountant, Vince Hokia as technical director, Daniel Rech as marketing manager, and Andrew Eisenmann and Suzette Porte as associate artistic directors.

Since its inception, Ma-Yi has benefited from the involvement of Filipino theatre artists based in New York, including production designer and director Loy Arcenas, composer Fabian Obispo, veteran actors Ching Valdes-Aran and Mia Katigbak, and novelist and playwright Jessica Hagedorn. Other Filipino artists and writers have also been involved with Ma-Yi, such as director Behn Cervantes; playwright and actor Rody Vera; playwright Marina Feleo-Gonzalez; National Artist of the Philippines for Literature Bienvenido Lumbera and Virgilio Almario; scholars Preachy Legasto, Nicanor Tiongson, and Roland Tolentino; and choreographer-dancer Potri Rangkamanis. In 2003, while in the United States as a visiting assistant professor at the University of California Irvine, Joi Barrios joined the group as its literary manager.

In 1998, Ma-Yi Theater expanded its mission to include works by other, non-Filipino, Asian American writers. This move was largely prodded by the company's recognition of the need for more developmental venues for new Asian American plays.

Some of Ma-Yi Theater's recent productions include Sides: The Fear is Real, The Romance of Magno Rubio (Obie Award), No Foreigners Beyond This Point (Drama Desk nomination), and Trial By Water.

The Ma-Yi Writers Lab was founded in 2004 by Sung Rno in connection with the TCG/NEA Playwright's Residence Program, and is currently led by co-directors Michael Lew and Rehana Lew Mirza. The Lab is Ma-Yi's resident company of emerging professional writers, and represents the largest group of professional Asian American playwrights ever assembled.

In 2005, Ma-Yi Theater was among 406 New York City arts and social service institutions to receive part of a $20 million grant from the Carnegie Corporation, which was made possible through a donation by New York City mayor Michael Bloomberg.

It was one of three companies to co-found and produce the first National Asian American Theater Festival, which was first held in 2007. The other two were the National Asian American Theater Company and Pan Asian Repertory Theatre.

In November 2015, Ma-Yi Theater Group member and playwright Lloyd Suh asked that a student production of his play Jesus in India be shut down at Pennsylvania's Clarion University because the school ignored the play's requirement of using South Asian actors. It was later found that Clarion University had never secured the playwright's permission to use his play, much less adapt it into a musical, although it had been cleared by the author's agent. Absent a signed contract, Clarion University proceeded to change the material and schedule a public performance that the author only found out about through social media.

== Selected productions ==
Some of its recent productions include:

- Lonnie Carter's The Romance of Magno Rubio
- Ralph Pena's Flipzoids
- Qui Nguyen's Soul Samurai and Agent G.
- Michi Barall's Rescue Me: A postmodern classic with snacks
- Michael Lew's Microcrisis, Bike America and Teenage Dick.
- Carla Ching's Sugar House
- Jason Kim, Helen Park, and Max Vernon's KPOP, produced with Ars Nova and Woodshed Collective.
- Lloyd Suh's Children of Vonderly, American Hwangap, co-produced with The Play Company, Jesus in India, and The Chinese Lady.
- Hansol Jung's Among the Dead

In 2006, Ma-Yi Theater Company's production of Warren Leight's No Foreigners Beyond This Point received a Drama Desk nomination for Best Play. In 2010, Ma-Yi Theater received a Special Drama Desk Award for Excellence.

Savage Stage: Plays by Ma-Yi Theater Company is an anthology of selected new works developed and produced by the company since its founding. Edited by Ma-Yi's Literary Manager, Joi Barrios, Savage Stage was published in 2007.

Ma-Yi Theater Company is a participant in "Artography: Arts in a Changing America", a pilot program launched by LINC (Leveraging Investments In Creativity) that seeks to map new arts practices in the United States resulting from demographic shifts.

== Awards ==
- 1997 Obie Award, Performance, Ching Valdes-Aran for Ralph Peña's Flipzoids
- 2002 Obie Award Grant
- 2003 Obie Award for Loy Arcenas, Arthur Acuña, Lonnie Carter, Ron Domingo, Jojo Gonzales, Ramon Ocampo, Orlando Pabotoy, and Ralph Peña, for their work on Lonnie Carter's The Romance of Magno Rubio
- 2006 Drama Desk Award Nomination, Best Play for Warren Leight's No Foreigners Beyond This Point
- 2006 Henry Hewes Design Nominations for Loy Arcenas (Scenic Design), and Fabian Obispo (Sound Design and Original Music) for their work on Warren Leight's No Foreigners Beyond This Point
- 2010 Drama Desk Award for Theater Excellence
- 2014 Off Broadway Alliance Award, Best Family Play, Lloyd Suh's The Wong Kids in the Secret of the Space Chupacabra Go!
- 2018 Lucille Lortel Award for Outstanding Musical "KPOP," with Ars Nova and Woodshed Collective
- 2018 Drama Desk Award Nomination for Outstanding Musical, "KPOP" with Ars Nova and Woodshed Collective
- 2018 Obie Award Ross Wetzsteon Award
