= Hansol Jung =

South Korean translator and playwright

- Born: Jeonju, South Korea
- Education: New York University; Pennsylvania State University; Yale University (MFA)
- Occupations: Playwright; Translator; Television writer
- Writing career
- Language: English; Korean
- Genre: Dramatic literature
- Notable works: Tales of the City; Cardboard Piano; Among the Dead
- Notable awards: Whiting Award (2018)

Hansol Jung is a South Korean translator and playwright. Jung is a recipient the Whiting Award in drama and three of her plays were listed on the 2015 Kilroys' List. Jung is a member of the Ma-Yi Theater Writers' Lab and was a Hodder Fellow at Princeton University. In addition to writing several plays, Jung has also written for the television series Tales Of the City.

== Biography ==
At age six, Jung and her family moved to apartheid-era South Africa. At age 13, Jung and her family returned to South Korea. At age 20, Jung studied abroad as an exchange student at New York University; three years later, she moved to the United States. Jung began an MFA in musical theatre directing at Pennsylvania State University, before transferring to receive an MFA in playwriting from the Yale School of Drama. Jung graduated from Yale in 2014.

== Career ==
=== Theatre ===
Jung has translated over thirty English-language musicals into Korean, including Spamalot, Dracula, The 25th Annual Putnam County Spelling Bee, and Evita. She has also worked as a theatre director and lyricist in South Korea.

In 2015, Jung participated in a residency at the Eugene O'Neill Theater Center's National Playwrights Conference, where she developed her play Cardboard Piano. That year, Jung was one of three playwrights to be selected for the New York Theatre Workshop's 2050 Fellowship. Jung was the 2016 Playwriting Fellow at Page 73 Theatre. While working at Page 73, Jung developed three plays: Wolf Play, Wild Goose Dreams, and an untitled play about drugs. Jung is also a member of the Ma-Yi Theater Writers' Lab.

Jung's plays Cardboard Piano, No More Sad Things, and Wolf Play were all listed on the 2015 Kilroys' List, which recognizes excellence in un-produced or rarely produced works by women, transgender, and non-binary playwrights. Jung was the playwright with the most plays on the list that year. Wild Goose Dreams was listed on the 2016 Kilroys' List.

For the 2019/20 academic year at the Lewis Center for the Arts at Princeton University, Jung was one of five Mary Mackall Gwinn Hodder Fellows and the only playwright of the five artists. During the Hodder Fellowship, Jung worked on her audio-feed play Window House.

In 2020, Jung was commissioned by Alliance Theatre to write an adaptation of Shakespeare's Romeo and Juliet as part of their Classic Remix Project. A reading of this adaptation occurred online with Two River Theatre in 2020. In April 2023, the adaptation was staged at Two River. It had a run off-Broadway in 2023 with the National Asian American Theatre Company (NAATCO), featuring an all Asian cast. In 2024, an audio-version of this adaptation was released by Portland's Play On Shakespeare.

Jung participated in the 24 Hour Plays project in March 2020 during the COVID-19 lockdown. Jung wrote the monologue "Cocktail Class" which was then performed by Ashlie Atkinson. A year later, the Jung wrote a second play for the project to celebrate the one-year anniversary. Jung was commissioned to create work for Woolly Mammoth Theatre Company and the Telephonic Literary Union's telephone theatrical event, Human Resources.

In 2022, New York's Tripwire Harlot Press announced they would be releasing a collected edition of some of Jung's works as part of their "Sledgehammer Series," which aims to publish more plays by writers of colour. Jung's volume is titled Doodles from the Margins: Three Plays and will feature Wolf Play, No More Sad Things, and Wild Goose Dreams and will include doodles and notes from Jung in the margins.

=== Television ===
Jung was part of the entirely LGBT writing staff of the 2019 Netflix miniseries Tales Of The City. Jung wrote the series' third episode, "Happy, Now?". In 2021, Jung was selected to be a participant in the Writers Guild of America, East's first Showrunner Academy program. She was also a writer for the 2022 Apple TV+ show, Pachinko. Jung is writing a television adaptation of C Pam Zhang's novel How Much of These Hills is Gold.

== Plays ==
=== Among the Dead ===
Among the Dead was the first play Jung wrote, which she also used to apply for the Yale School of Drama. The plot of the play spans a total of 30 years and explores legacy, impact, and experiences of the Korean 'comfort women' of World War II. Among the Dead premiered at HERE with the Ma-Yi Theatre Company in November 2016.

=== Cardboard Piano ===
Cardboard Piano is a two-act play set in Uganda. The first act takes place on the eve of the new millennium when two teenage girls, one American and one Ugandan, perform a makeshift wedding only to be interrupted by a child soldier. The second act takes place on their 'wedding' anniversary in 2014 and follows the American as she returns to Uganda. Cardboard Piano premiered the 2016 Humana Festival of New American Plays at the Actors Theatre of Louisville in Louisville, Kentucky. The premiere was directed by Leigh Silverman.

=== No More Sad Things ===
No More Sad Things follows a 42-year-old tourist in Maui who becomes romantically involved with a 15 year old. No More Sad Things co-premiered in November 2015 at Sideshow Theatre in Chicago, Illinois and Boise Contemporary Theatre in Boise, Idaho. Hansol Jung's brother, Jongbin, co-wrote music for the play with Hansol.

=== Wild Goose Dreams ===
Wild Goose Dreams is a love story between a North Korean defector, Nanhee, and Minsung, a South Korean Goose-father, who meet online. Jung wrote the first thirty pages in Korean before translating them into English. Wild Goose Dreams premiered in 2017 at La Jolla Playhouse in San Diego under the direction of Leigh Silverman.

=== Wolf Play ===
Wolf Play is about a Korean boy who is adopted in American and is "re-homed" after the original adoptive parents have a biological baby. He is then "second-chance-adopted" by a lesbian couple. In the play, the boy, Jeenu, believes himself to be a wolf but is really a puppet. Jung was inspired to write Wolf Play after reading a news article about Facebook and Yahoo groups used by some adoptive parents to re-home their adopted children, usually from other countries. Wolf Play premiered in March 2019 at the Artists Repertory Theatre in Portland, Oregon.

=== Merry Me ===
Merry Me is a queer sex comedy that plays with and references 17th century restoration comedies, Angels in America, Sappho, and Euripedes, among others. It follows Lieutenant Shane Horne, who attempts to convince the others on her naval base that her therapist's conversion therapy, invented by Horne, has turned her straight in a riff off The Country Wife, so she can spend time with married women. Merry Me premiered off-Broadway at the New York Theatre Workshop in 2023 under the direction of Leigh Silverman.

== Filmography ==
=== Television ===
Writer:

- Tales of the City (2019)
- Pachinko (2022)

== Awards ==
Year	Award	Category	Work	Results	Ref.
2014	Ruby Prize		No More Sad Things	Nominated	
2017	Helen Merrill Award for Playwriting			Won	
2018	Whiting Award for Drama			Won	
2020	Steinberg Playwright Award			Won	
2023	Lucille Lortel Awards	Outstanding Play	Wolf Play	Won	
2023	Lambda Literary Award	Drama	Wolf Play	Nominated	
2024	Obie Awards	Playwrighting	Wolf Play	Won	
2025	Herb Alpert Award in the Arts for Theatre			Won	
