= Rebecca McKinnis =

British actress

Rebecca McKinnis is a British actress and singer who is best known for playing Margaret New in Everybody's Talking about Jamie and Heidi Hansen in the original West End cast of Dear Evan Hansen.

== Early life and education ==
McKinnis grew up in Scotland and graduated in musical theatre from Mountview Academy of Theatre Arts in 2001.

== Stage ==
McKinnis first role in a theatre production was in Boy George's Taboo.

In 2012 McKinnis was part of the ensemble of Viva Forever! a comedy musical by Jennifer Saunders, featuring songs from the Spice Girls. The show ran at the Piccadilly Theatre between 2012 and 2013, closing in 6 months.

In 2015 she was part of the cast of The Sound of Music Live, a British TV production with Julian Ovenden in the role of Captain Von Trapp and Maria Friedman in that of Mother Abbess.

McKinnis joined the cast of the musical Women on the Verge of a Nervous Breakdown in October 2022 as Cristina. The UK version of the show included Tamsin Greig as Pepa, Haydn Gwynne as Lucia, with Dutch actress Willemijn Verkaik playing Paulina.

in 2018 it was announced that McKinnis will be playing Margaret, Jamie's mum, in the West End cast of Everybody's Talking About Jamie, alongside John McCrea (Jamie) and Shobna Gulati (Ray), part of the original cast. A movie version of the show was announced in 2021. In 2023 McKinnis joined Ivano Turco and Shobna Gulati in the second UK tour of the musical. The show played at London's Peacock Theatre, before embarking on the national tour. John Partridge was also part of the cast as Loco Chanelle with Sam Bailey playing Miss Hedge in spring-summer 2024.

From the end of 2019 McKinnis was Heidi Hansen, Evan's mum, in the first UK production of Dear Evan Hansen, alongside newcomer Sam Tutty in the role of Evan. The show reopened in October 2021, after the COVID-19 pandemic, with McKinnis and Tutty in the same roles.

== Theatre credits ==
Year	Production	Role	Location
	Taboo	Virus / cover Kim and Big Sue	UK tour
	We Will Rock You	Teacher and u/s Killer Queen	Dominion Theatre
2009 - 2010	Les Miserables	Madame	UK Tour
2012 - 2013	Viva Forever!	Ensemble	Piccadilly Theatre
2014 - 2015	Women on the Verge of a Nervous Breakdown	Cristina	Playhouse Theatre
2016 - 2017	Mamma Mia	u/s and Donna and Tanya	Prince of Wales Theatre
2017 - 2019	Everybody's Talking about Jamie	u/s and Margaret New	Apollo Theatre
2019 - 2022	Dear Evan Hansen	Heidi Hansen	Noël Coward Theatre
2023	Wish You Were Dead	Tessa	UK tour
2023 - 2024	Everybody's Talking about Jamie	Margaret New	Peacock Theatre
2024	Everybody's Talking about Jamie	Margaret New	UK tour

== Filmography ==
=== Film ===
Year	Title	Role	Notes
2006	Shelf Life	Clarissa	Short Film
2017	Beauty and the Beast	villager	

=== Television ===
Year	Title	Role	Notes
2015	The Sound of Music Live	Nun	
