= Jamie Campbell (personality) =

British Drag Queen and Media Personality

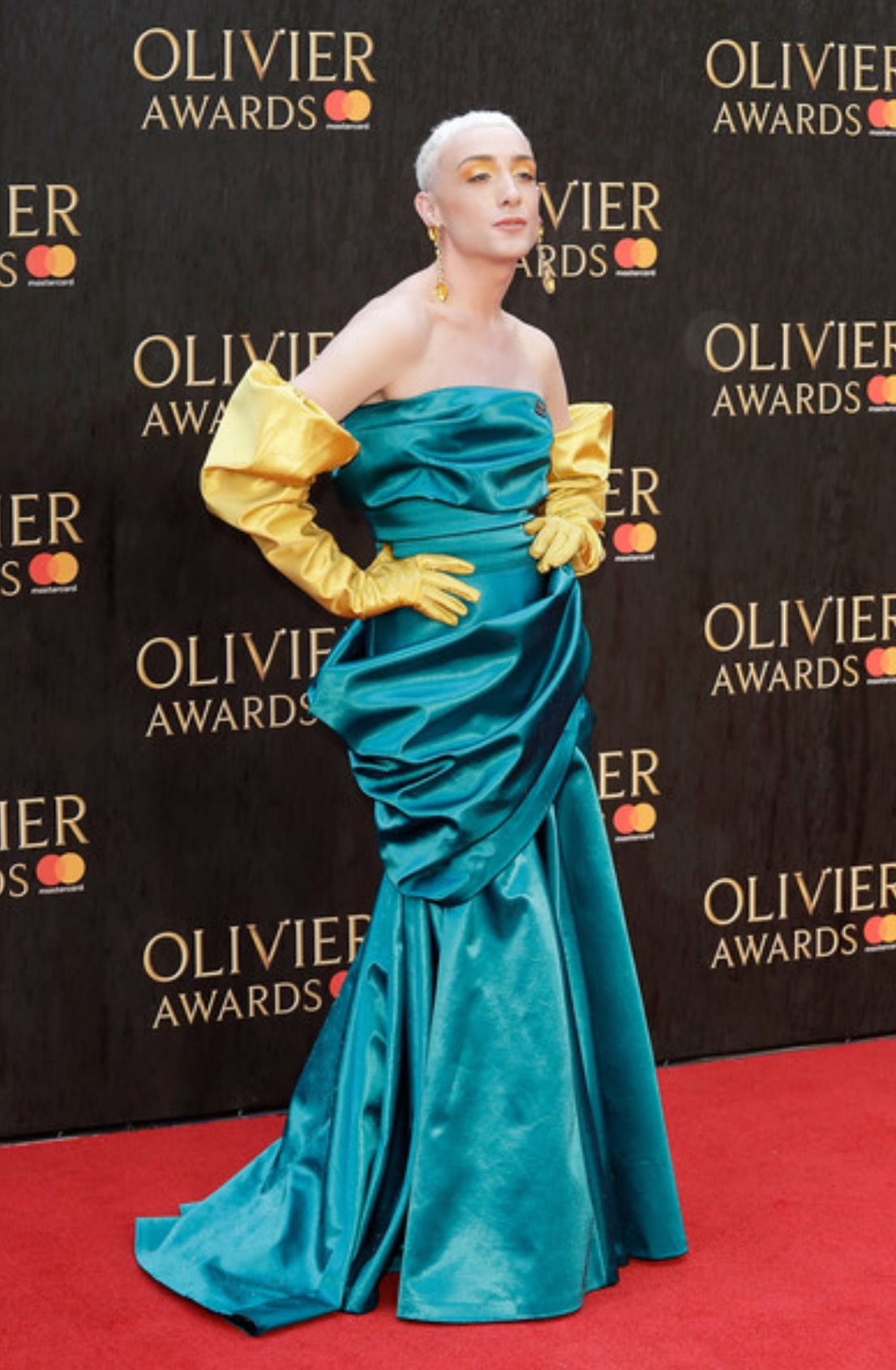
- Jamie Campbell at the 2018 Olivier Awards
- Born: Jamie Joseph Campbell; 12 December 1994 (age 31); Bishop Auckland, England
- Other name: Fifi la True

Jamie Joseph Campbell (also known as Fifi la True) is a British drag queen and media personality who is the inspiration behind the musical Everybody's Talking About Jamie and its film adaptation.

== Early life ==
Campbell was born in Bishop Auckland, County Durham. He was raised by his mother Margaret. His parents divorced when he was 7 years old. He came out as gay at the age of 14.

Campbell attended St John's Catholic School from 2005 to 2011 and studied his A-Levels at Queen Elizabeth Sixth Form College.

== Documentary ==
In 2011 Campbell contacted a number of film production companies, proposing to capture the story of his journey to high school prom in drag. Director, Jenny Popplewell, alongside Firecracker Films produced Jamie: Drag Queen at 16 for BBC Three as a part of their Extraordinary Me series.

== Musical ==
Director Jonathan Butterell saw the documentary by chance and decided to turn it into a musical. He worked with writer Tom MacRae and composer Dan Gillespie Sells for the score.

Everybody’s Talking About Jamie premiered at the Crucible Theatre in Sheffield in March 2017. West End Producer Nica Burns saw the show and brought it to the Apollo Theatre in November 2017 where it ran until September 2021.

Alongside the West End production, there have been two UK tours and international productions in the US, Mexico, Italy, South Korea and Japan.

The musical was nominated for 5 Olivier Awards and won Best New Musical at the WhatsOnStage Awards

== Film ==
Warp Films acquired the rights to adapt the stage show for the on-screen musical version of the same name. Butterell, MacRae and Gillespie-Sells served in the same roles as they did for the original musical for the film adaptation.

New Regency and Film4 Productions produced the film and the distribution rights were originally with Disney via their acquisition of 20th Century Studios.

Originally intended for a 23 October 2020 release, the film was pushed back because of the COVID-19 pandemic. The film was eventually released on 17 September 2021 by Amazon Studios on Amazon Prime.

Jamie and his mother Margaret appear in a series of scenes in the closing credits of the film.

Everybody’s Talking About Jamie was nominated for Outstanding British Film at the 75th BAFTA Awards in 2022.
