= Everybody's Talking About Jamie (film) =

2021 musical comedy drama film

- Promotional release poster
- Directed by: Jonathan Butterell
- Screenplay by: Tom MacRae
- Based on: Everybody's Talking About Jamie by Dan Gillespie Sells and Tom MacRae, Jamie: Drag Queen at 16 by Jenny Popplewell and Jamie Campbell
- Produced by: Mark Herbert; Peter Carlton; Arnon Milchan
- Starring: Max Harwood; Sarah Lancashire; Lauren Patel; Shobna Gulati; Ralph Ineson; Adeel Akhtar; Samuel Bottomley; Sharon Horgan; Richard E. Grant; Zane Alsaroori
- Cinematography: Christopher Ross
- Edited by: Mark Everson
- Music by: Anne Dudley; Dan Gillespie Sells and Tom MacRae (songs)
- Production companies: Regency Enterprises; Film4 Productions; Warp Films; New Regency
- Distributed by: Amazon Studios
- Release dates: 12 June 2021 (Frameline); 10 September 2021 (United States); 17 September 2021 (worldwide)
- Running time: 115 minutes
- Countries: United Kingdom; United States
- Language: English

Everybody's Talking About Jamie is a 2021 coming-of-age musical comedy drama film directed by Jonathan Butterell (in his feature directorial debut) from a screenplay by Tom MacRae based on the stage musical of the same name, which in turn was adapted from the BBC Three documentary Jamie: Drag Queen at 16 by Jenny Popplewell. The film stars newcomer Max Harwood with Sarah Lancashire, Lauren Patel, Shobna Gulati, Ralph Ineson, Adeel Akhtar, Samuel Bottomley, Sharon Horgan, and Richard E. Grant. The story follows and is based upon the true-life story of 16-year-old British schoolboy Jamie Campbell, as he overcomes prejudice and bullying, to step out of the darkness and become a drag queen.

Following delays of a planned theatrical release by 20th Century Studios, due to the COVID-19 pandemic, Everybody's Talking About Jamie was released in select theatres in the United States on 10 September 2021, followed by a worldwide streaming release on 17 September 2021 via Amazon Studios on Amazon Prime Video. The film has received positive reviews and was nominated for the BAFTA Award for Outstanding British Film.

== Plot ==
In Sheffield, England, Jamie New, a gay boy, lives with his single mother Margaret, and attends Mayfield School on his 16th birthday. At school, his teacher rebukes the pupils for their unrealistic career plans. Jamie pretends to agree with her, but secretly he dreams of being a drag queen onstage ("And You Don't Even Know It").

Margaret goes to see her friend Ray to help her prepare for Jamie's birthday party. Jamie's estranged father, Wayne, who has lived with his girlfriend Cheryl for some time, is expected to arrive at the party, but at the last minute he messages Margaret to cancel his appearance. Jamie arrives and Margaret lies about his absence, pretending he gave him a card. Margaret presents Jamie a pair of expensive red high heels that he has been saving up money for. Jamie is disappointed about his father's absence and reminisces about their strained relationship and an unspecified hurtful small comment made in his childhood that he is still struggling to overcome ("Wall in My Head").

At school, Jamie shows the heels to his best friend Pritti Pasha - a girl constantly harassed for her religion - and confesses his desire to be a drag queen. After class bully Dean Paxton insults Jamie and Pritti for their differences and Jamie sticks up for Pritti, Pritti returns the favour by encouraging Jamie to wear the shoes to the school prom and be the drag queen he wants to be ("Spotlight").

Margaret goes to see Wayne at his girlfriend Cheryl's house, and admonishes him for not showing up for Jamie at all on his sixteenth birthday and for his lack of parental efforts. Wayne replies that Cheryl is pregnant with their son and urges Margaret to tell Jamie the truth - that he is bitterly disappointed that Jamie is not a stereotype male, and that he wants nothing at all to do with him, especially as Jamie is now no longer a minor.

Jamie goes to a drag shop, House of Loco, where he intends to find his first dress. Hugo Battersby, the drag shop owner, briefly discusses Jamie's dreams of being a drag queen with him, and reveals that he was himself once a drag superstar, Miss Loco Chanelle, and that his past was filled with a loving drag family that was destroyed when the AIDS epidemic ravaged the community and claimed the life of his male lover ("This Was Me"). He describes drag as a form of revolution, and that a drag queen is never deterred. He offers to mentor Jamie, and to help him with his plan of coming out at the prom by allowing Jamie to debut at a drag show at the local club. He tells Jamie and Pritti that he will give Loco Chanelle's dress to him if he can earn it. Jamie informs his mother and Ray of the visit to the shop and his upcoming drag show, and over the next few weeks earns enough money to buy the dress. Meanwhile, Margaret struggles to tell Jamie about her encounter with his father, and is unable to break his heart by telling him his father's true feelings. Jamie mistakenly believes that his father will attend the drag show.

At school on the day of the show, Jamie beckons Pritti into the school toilets and begs for her help in getting rid of a badly painted eyebrow he accidentally gave himself. Pritti reluctantly agrees to help him, but before she can manage Hedge catches them. After embarrassedly attempting to explain the eyebrow incident, Hedge humiliates Jamie by demanding he return to class with his makeup intact ("Work of Art"). When Jamie arrives in art class, his classmates ridicule him, and he responds by telling them about his drag show, determined not to be shamed ("Work of Art (Reprise)")

After school, Dean calls out Jamie, intending to go to the show and humiliate him. Jamie goes to the club but gets cold feet and attempts to back out, but is stopped by Hugo dressed up as Loco Chanelle, who encouraged him to perform and dresses him up along with the other drag queens ("Over the Top"). Margaret and Ray arrive at the show, along with Dean and his friends who intend to ridicule Jamie's drag performance, and Margaret sends Jamie flowers and a card which she pretends is from Wayne, which Jamie is thrilled to receive. In an attempt to come up with his drag name, Jamie cries frustratedly, "it's about me. Me. Me!", leading Hugo to introduce Jamie as "Mimi Me". He performs a lip synced song as Mimi Me – Dean and the boys heckle him briefly but are quickly removed, and Mimi Me finishes the number in style, with Pritti and his mother in the audience.

The next day at school, the whole school gossips about the drag show ("Everybody's Talking About Jamie"). Jamie arrives to class late in dramatic fashion and with make-up, which Hedge orders him to remove, and Jamie refuses, quoting school dress rules and mocking her. Dean gets into a fight with Jamie, and declares he will not attend prom if Jamie comes as Mimi Me. At a meeting with the head teacher, Hedge demands that Jamie not wear a dress to prom and claims he will selfishly ruin the special night for everyone else. Jamie leaves, upset.

Jamie goes to Pritti's house for consolation, but Pritti urges Jamie to be himself at prom, and that Mimi Me doesn't have to always be in his life. Jamie reveals his bodily self-loathing without Mimi Me, and Pritti comforts him by revealing that in Arabic, his name - Jamil - means beautiful ("It Means Beautiful"). Newly confident, Jamie goes to visit his father to thank him for the flowers, and Wayne harshly reveals the truth about Margaret's lies, and his own disinterest and disappointment, telling him he had always longed for a better son.

Jamie returns home and confronts Margaret. He rips his Loco Chanelle dress and speaks cruelly, before storming off. Margaret, alone, reminisces about the joys and difficulties of having Jamie as a son ("He's My Boy"). Jamie, in an angry and confused downward spiral, shoplifts alcohol, gets drunk, and sneaks into a sports game that Wayne is attending, going onto the field to briefly reveal himself to his father in partial drag. He is physically harassed and shoved off the field. Beaten and bloody, Jamie goes to Hugo's shop after it is shut, where Hugo bathes his injured nose and comforts him.

Jamie comes home. He and Margaret apologize to each other and reconcile over their differences, as well as briefly discussing Jamie's queer personality ("My Man, Your Boy"). On prom night, Year 11 prepare for the event. Pritti arrives in makeup and fends off Dean's bullying with an inspiring speech, reminding Dean that after school ends tomorrow, he will no longer be a big man in a small social world. Jamie arrives, not in drag or as Mimi Me, but as himself, Jamie, dressed in a traditional girls’ prom dress with no makeup.

Hedge admonishes Jamie, and won't allow him into prom, but his classmates, led by Pritti, rally their support and eventually Hedge relents and allows everyone in. After sharing a moment together, Pritti goes into prom while Jamie implores Dean to let bygones be bygones and dance with him before prom ends. The class celebrate together and support each other ("Out of the Darkness (A Place Where We Belong)").

== Cast ==
- Max Harwood as Jamie New / Mimi Me, a 16-year-old Sheffield teenager who dreams of becoming a drag queen.
  - Noah Leggott as young Jamie
- Sarah Lancashire as Margaret New, Jamie's supportive single mother and Wayne's former wife.
- Lauren Patel as Pritti Pasha, Jamie's classmate and best friend.
- Shobna Gulati as Ray, Margaret's close friend. Gulati previously played this role in the West End stage production and is in this role on the UK tour of the production.
- Ralph Ineson as Wayne New, Jamie's estranged homophobic father and Margaret's former husband.
- Adeel Akhtar as Iman Masood, principal of the high school Jamie attends.
- Samuel Bottomley as Dean Paxton, the school bully.
- Sharon Horgan as Miss Hedge, the practical instructor of Year 11.
- Richard E. Grant as Hugo Battersby / Loco Chanelle, a former drag queen and Jamie's mentor.
  - John McCrea as young Loco Chanelle. McCrea originated the role of Jamie in the original Sheffield Theatres production of the stage musical, later reprising the role for the West End production.
- Charlotte Salt as Cheryl, Wayne's second wife.
- Ola Jide/Son of a Tutu as Sandra Bollock, a drag queen at Legs Eleven and friend of Hugo's.
- Gareth Joyner as Myra Dubois, a drag queen at Legs Eleven and a friend of Hugo.
- Dan Wallace/Anna Phylactic as Tray Sophisticay, a drag queen at Legs Eleven and friend of Hugo's.
- Bianca Del Rio as herself/Ms. Haylock, the school art teacher. The onscreen character shares the same surname as Del Rio's real name. Del Rio previously played Loco Chanelle in the West End stage production and reprises this role on select dates across the UK tour of the production and also originated the role on the US stage.
- Layton Williams as a dancer. Williams previously played Jamie in the West End stage production, and he played the role of Jamie on the first UK tour.
- Jamie Campbell/Fifi La True as club "Door Whore" (cameo role).
- Zane Alsaroori as Sayid, a classmate of Jamie's.

== Production ==
The film was announced in May 2018. In June 2019, it was revealed that Richard E. Grant, John McCrea, Sharon Horgan, Sarah Lancashire and Shobna Gulati and newcomer Max Harwood had joined the cast, with original stage director Jonathan Butterell making his feature film debut from a screenplay by Tom MacRae. Regency Enterprises, Film4 Productions, and Warp Films would produce, with distribution by 20th Century Studios.

In a 2021 interview, Jamie Campbell commented that "it was important to him that the movie captured British humour perfectly, and had an accurate representation of the working class", and that retaining the "grit and rawness" as well as the humour, achieved by having the team involved in the musical also be involved in the film, had been key to the film.

=== Filming ===
Principal photography began in Sheffield, South Yorkshire, England on 24 June 2019.

== Music ==
The film removes several songs from the original score, including "The Legend of Loco Chanelle (and the Blood Red Dress)" (replaced by "This Was Me"), "If I Met Myself Again", "Limited Edition Prom Night Special", "Ugly in This Ugly World", "Prom Song" and all reprises save for "It Means Beautiful".

The film's soundtrack album was released by Island Records and New Regency Music on 10 September 2021, the same day as its U.S. release. The film contains one new song, "This Was Me", performed by Richard E. Grant and Frankie Goes to Hollywood frontman Holly Johnson. Alongside the film's musical numbers, the soundtrack includes contributions from Becky Hill, Todrick Hall, Sophie Ellis-Bextor (who had previously recorded a version of "Work of Art" in 2017), Chaka Khan and The Feeling. During his debut show as Mimi, Jamie lip-syncs to "Kiss The Sun" as performed by Beverley Knight, which is found within the “Over the Top” track on the album.

== Release ==
The film was originally scheduled to be released on 23 October 2020, but was postponed to 22 January 2021, by Disney, the parent company of 20th Century, due to the COVID-19 pandemic. It was postponed again to 26 February 2021. However, it was then removed from the release calendar. In May 2021, Disney cancelled the film's domestic theatrical release and sold the distribution rights to Amazon Studios. Amazon later set it for a 17 September 2021 release on Amazon Prime Video.

Everybody's Talking About Jamie premiered at the Frameline Film Festival on 12 June 2021, as part of their San Francisco Pride celebration. It was released in selected theatres on 10 September 2021, in the United States.

== Reception ==
The film received generally positive reviews. On review aggregator Rotten Tomatoes, the film has an 82% approval score, based on 104 reviews, with an average rating of 6.8/10. The website's critics consensus reads: "It may not be as effervescent as its title character, but Everybody's Talking About Jamie remains an infectiously enjoyable musical with an uplifting message." On Metacritic it has a rating of 62 out of 100 from 22 reviews, indicating "generally favorable" reviews.

David Rooney of The Hollywood Reporter gave a positive review, saying "There's abundant joy, spirited resilience and sweet humor on tap that should be especially infectious for young LGBTQ audiences, or anyone with experience of outsider stigmatization."

Less favorable reviews criticized the film for incoherent "all frosting, no cake" slant, for "barrage of grimacing uplift", for having "plenty of empowerment but not much depth", for being full of "drag-lite drag scenes" and "'Glee'-colored dance numbers", which "won’t be showing up in lip synchs anytime soon". In short, "drag is what it is, and drag is what it does".

== Accolades ==
| Year | Award | Category | Recipient(s) | Result | Ref. |
|---|---|---|---|---|---|
| 2021 | British Independent Film Awards | Breakthrough Performance | Max Harwood | Nominated | |
| 2021 | British Independent Film Awards | Best Costume Design | Everybody's Talking About Jamie | Nominated | |
| 2021 | British Independent Film Awards | Best Make-Up & Hair Design | Everybody's Talking About Jamie | Nominated | |
| 2022 | GLAAD Media Awards | Outstanding Film – Wide Release | Everybody's Talking About Jamie | Nominated | |
| 2022 | British Academy Film Awards | Outstanding British Film | Everybody's Talking About Jamie | Nominated | |
