= Viva Forever! (musical) =

Musical based on Spice Girls songs

- Promotional poster
- Music: Various artists
- Lyrics: Various artists
- Book: Jennifer Saunders
- Basis: Songs by the Spice Girls
- Productions: West End: 11 December 2012 – 29 June 2013

Viva Forever! is a jukebox musical based on the songs of 1990s British girl-group the Spice Girls. It was written by Jennifer Saunders, produced by Judy Craymer and directed by Paul Garrington. Musical Supervision by Martin Koch, and Musical Direction by John Donovan. Sound Design by Bobby Aitken.

The show began previews at the Piccadilly Theatre, London, on 27 November 2012 and had its Press Night on 11 December 2012. The score features nearly every song from the Spice Girls' first two albums albums, Spice (1996) and Spiceworld (1997), from several their third album—such as their hit "Goodbye"—as well as several solo single releases, including "Look At Me" by Geri Halliwell and "I Turn To You" by Melanie C. The show generated over £2,000,000 (in US money, $2,694,328.44) in pre-opening ticket sales.

Viva Forever! was panned by critics, receiving some of the worst reviews of 2012. It was announced on 2 May 2013 that the show was to close on 29 June 2013 after seven months with a loss of at least £5 million. In a 2016 interview, Spice Girls group member Mel B said she disliked the musical and that it "wasn’t actually the kind of show the group hoped for."

== Plot ==
The musical is based on a band member named Viva who lives on a houseboat. The story starts when her band gets through to the audition stages of a TV show. The band get through multiple rounds of the auditions, but on the final round, Viva gets through, without her bandmates. As Viva follows her dreams, Viva Forever! charts her journey into the world of overnight celebrity and its impact on her mother and the friends she thought she'd have forever.

== Background ==
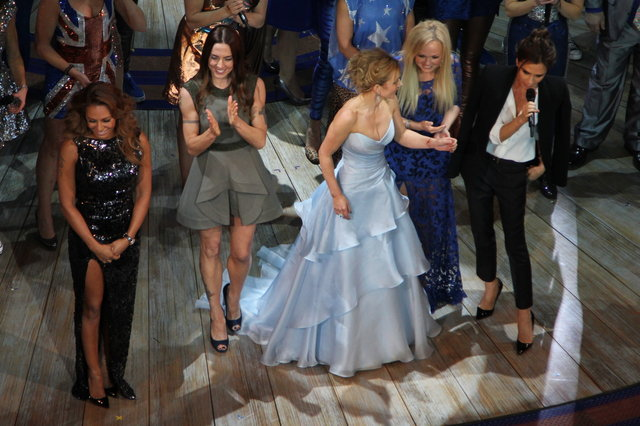
The Spice Girls at the premiere night, 2012

In 2010, Judy Craymer teamed up with Geri Halliwell, Simon Fuller (the one-time manager of the Spice Girls) and Universal Music to start developing a musical entitled Viva Forever!, based on the songs of the Spice Girls. Although the Spice Girls themselves were not to be in the show, they were to influence the show's cast and production choices in a story which uses their music but bears no relation to their personal story. This approach is similar to that of ABBA's music in Mamma Mia!, a show which Craymer produced and helped turn into a global phenomenon.

On 26 June 2012, to promote the launch of the show, all five former Spice Girls attended a press conference in London at the St. Pancras Renaissance London Hotel, the location where the group filmed the music video for their breakthrough hit "Wannabe," sixteen years earlier, to the day.

=== Productions ===
==== West End (2012–2013) ====
On 13 July 2012, the first casting was announced with Hannah John-Kamen as Viva and Sally Ann Triplett as her mother Lauren and following previews from 27 November 2012, Viva Forever! opened in the West End on 11 December 2012 at the Piccadilly Theatre after a delayed start, due to the late arrival of Victoria Beckham, one of the original group members. It was announced on 2 May 2013 that the show would close after only seven months, with a loss of "at least £5 million". Due to poor ticket sales, the show closed on 29 June 2013. It was replaced at the Piccadilly Theatre by the musical Dirty Dancing from 13 July 2013.

Producer Judy Craymer told the Evening Standard, "Despite wonderful audiences, standing ovations and positive social media it has proved very difficult to fight back when such negativity was cast, especially in these very tough economic times."

== Musical numbers ==
When the show first opened, it included 23 musical numbers, featuring some of the Spice Girls' biggest hits including a mashup of "Mama" and "Goodbye", as well as two solo songs from the group's solo efforts: "I Turn to You" by Melanie C and "Look at Me" by Geri Halliwell.

The following musical numbers were part of the show on opening night:

Act I

- Prologue / "Wannabe" – The Company
- "Something Kinda Funny" – Viva, Luce, Diamond & Holly
- "Let Love Lead the Way" – Lauren, Suzi & Mitch
- "Right Back At Ya" – Viva, Luce, Diamond, Holly & The Company
- "Denying" – Simone & Johnny
- "The Lady Is a Vamp" – Viva, Luce, Diamond & Holly
- "Too Much" – Lauren & Suzi
- "Look at Me" – Simone, Johnny & Karen
- "Saturday Night Divas" – The Company
- "Stop" – Viva, Luce, Diamond & Holly
- "Do It" – Simone, Viva, Luce, Diamond & Holly
- "Say You'll Be There" – Viva, Luce, Diamond & Holly
- "Goodbye" / "Mama" / "Headlines (Friendship Never Ends)" – Lauren, Viva & Simone

Act II

- Entr'acte ("Who Do You Think You Are" / " Spice Up Your Life" / "Right Back At Ya" / "Say You'll be There") – Full cast
- "Move Over" / "Tell Me Why" – Leon, Viva, Luce, Diamond, Holly, The Company
- "Time Goes By" – Viva
- "Who Do You Think You Are" – Simone, Viva, & The Company
- "Spice Up Your Life" – Viva, & The Company
- "Viva Forever" – Angel & Viva
- "2 Become 1" – Lauren & Mitch
- "I Turn to You" – Simone
- "Headlines (Friendship Never Ends)" (reprise) – Viva & Lauren
- "Saturday Night Divas" (Reprise) – The Company
- "Wannabe" (Reprise) – Viva, Luce, Diamond, Holly & The Company

Encore

- "Stop" (Reprise) – The Company
- "Spice Up Your Life" (Reprise) – The Company
- Playout; ("Who Do You Think You Are") – The Orchestra

== Principal roles and original cast ==
The following cast and characters are part of the show:

Character	Character description	Original West End actor / actress
Viva	A 20-year-old girl, who lives on a houseboat with her adoptive mother, and is a member of a four piece all-female band.	Hannah John-Kamen
Lauren	Viva's adoptive mother, who lives with her daughter on a houseboat.	Sally Ann Triplett
Luce	A member of Viva's band, and Viva's friend.	Siobhan Athwal
Diamond	A member of Viva's band, and Viva's friend.	Lucy Phelps
Holly	A member of Viva's band, and Viva's friend.	Dominique Provost-Chalkley
Suzi	Lauren's best friend.	Lucy Montgomery
Mitch	Lauren's friend.	Simon Slater
Simone	A TV talent show judge.	Sally Dexter
Johnny	A Judge on Viva's TV talent show.	Bill Ward
Karen	A Judge on Viva's TV talent show.	Tamara Wall
Angel	The musical director of the TV talent show	Ben Cura
Minty	A production assistant for the TV talent show	Hatty Preston
Leon	A stylist for the TV talent show	Simon Adkins
Lance	The presenter for the TV talent show	Anthony Topham
Ensemble	Ensemble members	Tom Kanavan, Zak Nemorin, Curtis Angus, Luke Jackson, Oliver Roll, David Rudin, Darren Carnall, Myles Brown, Charlotte Gorton, Rebecca McKinnis, Lucy Thatcher, Roxanne Palner, Charlotte Walcott, Sophie Carmen-Jones, Carla Nella, Kirstie Skinvington, Helen Ternent

=== Changes to musical numbers ===
During the course of the show's run, several changes were made to the show's script and musical numbers. "Something Kinda Funny" was replaced with a reprise of "Wannabe", "The Lady Is a Vamp" was reinstated into the show after being removed, and "Say You'll Be There" was re-orchestrated into an up-tempo number more similar to the original version of the song. The Entr'acte was shortened, "Time Goes By" was replaced with a reprise of "Mama", A few lines of "Never Give Up on the Good Times" were added and sung a cappella into the second act of the show, "I Turn to You" was removed from the show as well as the reprise of "Saturday Night Divas", and "Headlines (Friendship Never Ends)" was shortened.

== Critical response ==
The theatrical reviews following the opening Press Night (First Night) were largely negative:

- Daily Telegraph: "I'll tell you what I wanted, what I really really wanted – I wanted this terrible show to stop. Viva Forever! has absolutely no redeeming features whatsoever. This show is not just bad, it is definitively, monumentally and historically bad. I shall not dwell on the plot because, goodness knows, Jennifer Saunders, its writer, certainly hasn’t done. Its producer, Judy Craymer, may profess to have spent some money on it, but I have no idea where it has gone and, as for the songs, they are uniformly scummy, scratchy and screechy. There is no acting to speak of, either, so I shall not identify any of the girls who appear in it, lest they be subjected to recriminations. Thrown together without any great thought and ugly in every respect, Viva Forever! marks the West End coming to an unequivocal dead end. This musical is tawdry, lazy and unedifying, and one could sense a miasma of disappointment emanating from an audience of up-for-it Spice Girls fans realising that they had paid top whack to see a clunker."
- The Independent: "Charmless, messy, lacklustre... so lacking in any truly original or challenging spark of its own. Viva Forever! forever? I rather think not."
- The Guardian: "The real problem is the songs. For one thing, there aren't enough memorable hits in a career that lasted for three albums to support two hours of theatre."
- The Stage: "One of the biggest disappointments is Jennifer Saunders’ rather trite book which is symbolic of what is sadly a lazily put-together show. Saunders exhibits her lack of experience in writing for the stage. It soon becomes clear that the Spice Girls’ back catalogue is not generally of a high enough standard to be reinterpreted in this way."
- Evening Standard: "Jennifer Saunders’s script, which ought to carry us efficiently from one song to the next, is ponderous. Aspects of it are positively bizarre."
- TQS magazine: "Viva Forever! is an overlong, (mostly) unfunny and underwhelming show which makes even the most devout Spice fan question their musical taste."
- The Huffington Post: "The world premiere of the Spice Girls' musical certainly had its moments of high drama which kept the audience glued. Unfortunately, none of it was happening on the stage."
- What's on Stage: "Jennifer Saunders’ confused narrative - totally un-theatrical, completely un-satirical."
- Sunday Express: "Viva Forever! is a phoney, manufactured musical about a phoney, manufactured band, marooned by a structurally inept, unfunny script."
