= Jonathan Butterell =

English choreographer and director

- Born: Sheffield, South Yorkshire, England
- Occupations: Choreographer, director

Jonathan Butterell is an English choreographer, stage director, and film director. He has worked in the West End, on Broadway, and Off-Broadway.

== Biography ==
Butterell grew up in "a tough part of Sheffield, England", and was an actor and dancer. Matthew Bourne invited him to dance class and also asked for his help in movement. Sam Mendes then asked him to choreograph Company at the Donmar Warehouse.

He has worked on musicals and plays for the Donmar Warehouse, as choreographer or movement director, including Into the Woods (1998) and How I Learned to Drive (1998).

For the Royal National Theatre he choreographed Fair Ladies at a Game of Poem Cards and Othello; in 1996 he was the movement director of Six Characters in Search of an Author for the Abbey Theatre, Dublin. He devised and directed the Michael Ball concert Alone Together (2004). He directed the premiere of the musical Giant by Michael John LaChiusa and Sybille Pearson at the Signature Theatre, Arlington, Virginia in 2009. For Opera North, Leeds he was the co-director and choreographer of Sweeney Todd in 2002.

He choreographed for the 1999 workshop production of the musical Wise Guys at the New York Theatre Workshop, directed by Sam Mendes, which eventually was produced as Road Show.

On Broadway he choreographed the 2003 revival of Nine. He also was the choreographer for Nine in London. He was the choreographer for the 2004 revival of Fiddler on the Roof and The Light in the Piazza in 2005. For film, he was the choreographer in Finding Neverland (2004).

Off-Broadway he directed Inner Voices at the Zipper Factory, New York, in 2008, a three-play work that starred Victoria Clark, Jennifer Damiano, and Barbara Walsh. He directed a new Inner Voices:Solo Musicals in April 2010 as presented by Premieres and Primary Stages at 59E59Theatres, New York. He choreographed the Lynn Ahrens - Stephen Flaherty musical A Man of No Importance in 2002. Butterell provided musical staging for the Michael John LaChiusa musical See What I Wanna See in 2005 at the Public Theater.

The new musical he developed with Dan Gillespie Sells and Tom MacRae, Everybody's Talking About Jamie, ran at Sheffield Crucible and transferred to the Apollo Theatre in November 2017.

In 2021, he made his feature film directorial debut with the movie adaptation of Everybody's Talking About Jamie.
