= The Loneliest Boy in the World =

2022 film by Martin Owen

- Release poster
- Directed by: Martin Owen
- Written by: Piers Ashworth
- Produced by: Matt Williams; Pat Wintersgill; Piers Ashworth; Ryan Hamilton
- Starring: Max Harwood; Hero Fiennes Tiffin; Susan Wokoma; Evan Ross; Tallulah Haddon; Hammed Animashaun; Jacob Sartorius; Zenobia Williams; Sam Coleman; Mitchell Zhangazha; Nicola Roberts; Alex Murphy; Carol Anne Watts; Ashley Benson; Ben Miller
- Cinematography: Håvard Helle
- Edited by: Jeremy Gibbs
- Music by: The Invisible Men
- Production companies: Future Artists Entertainment; Loneliest Boy in the World; Lip Sync
- Distributed by: Well Go USA Entertainment
- Release dates: 13 August 2022 (Popcorn Frights Film Festival); 14 October 2022 (United States)
- Running time: 91 minutes
- Country: United Kingdom
- Language: English
- Box office: $52,215

The Loneliest Boy in the World is a 2022 British comedy horror film written by Piers Ashworth and directed by Martin Owen. It stars Max Harwood and Hero Fiennes Tiffin.

== Plot ==
In 1987, teenager Oliver Martin lives alone following the loss of his mother. He is visited by social workers Margot Seale and Julius Carter, who check up on him and suggest that he make friends. Taking their advice to heart, Oliver ventures out of the house and meets Chloe, a girl around his age. Chloe, disturbed by the revelation of his mother's accidental death, quickly leaves him.

The next day, Oliver overhears the funeral procession of Mitch, killed by debris from a plane crash the day before. Excited that Oliver has seemingly made a friend, Margot suggests he invite Mitch over. Oliver exhumes Mitch's body from the graveyard, and also decides to exhume the bodies of Susanne, Mel, and Frank, a family who died in the crash. In the morning, Oliver discovers Mitch and the family alive again.

At the town's local hotspot, Chloe asks Oliver out on a date as she fends off the advances of Kurt, the town bully and a frequent tormentor of Oliver. Mitch accompanies them, and the two share a kiss.

On Halloween, Margot and Julius stop by and encounter Mitch, who distracts Margot from finding out the family's undead nature. As night falls, Kurt arrives at Oliver's house dressed as Freddy Krueger aiming to extort money from him. Mitch comes to Oliver's rescue.

Bringing a camera with him and calling an ambulance beforehand, Julius sneaks into Oliver's house to record the undead and prove Oliver's supposed insanity. Julius runs out of the house screaming in horror.

Susanne mistakenly ignites a fire that spreads throughout the house, killing Mitch and the resurrected family. Chloe arrives and comforts Oliver, and the two of them walk away from the house.

== Cast ==
- Max Harwood as Oliver
- Hero Fiennes Tiffin as Mitch
- Susan Wokoma as Susanne
- Evan Ross as Julius
- Tallulah Haddon as Chloe
- Hammed Animashaun as Elliot
- Jacob Sartorius as Kurt
- Ben Miller as Frank
- Alex Murphy as Doug
- Nicola Roberts as Rachel
- Ashley Benson as Margot
- Zenobia Williams as Mel
- Carol Anne Watts as Oliver's mother

== Production ==
Principal photography began on 21 February 2021 in Llansteffan and the Crymlyn Burrows area in Wales, and lasted eight weeks.

== Release ==
The Loneliest Boy in the World had its world premiere at the Popcorn Frights Film Festival in Fort Lauderdale, Florida, on 13 August 2022. It was also screened as the opening film of the 2022 edition of Manchester's Grimmfest film festival on 6 October. The film was released by Well Go USA Entertainment in select theatres in the United States on 14 October 2022, on demand and on digital on 18 October, and on DVD and Blu-ray on 20 December.

== Reception ==
On the review aggregator website Rotten Tomatoes, the film holds an approval rating of 41% based on 17 reviews, with an average rating of 4.2/10.

Preston Barta of the Denton Record-Chronicle gave the film a positive review and wrote, "It's a lovable cinematic Frankenstein of '80s movies and television that's peppered with exciting camera tricks and dazzling production design".

Rich Cross of Starburst gave the film a negative review: "The result is a surreal tale that aims to blend the corpse comedy of Weekend at Bernie's with the macabre motifs of a Tim Burton fantasy, but which ends up strangely devoid of life."

Chad Collins of Dread Central awarded the film two stars out of five and wrote, "The Loneliest Boy in the World is a pastel zombie throwback of sitcom terror whose innate wholesomeness can't compensate for the sense that these undead themes have walked a hundred times before."

Sheila O'Malley of RogerEbert.com awarded the film one-and-a-half stars out of four and wrote, "The film relies too heavily on cliche and hopes the audience won't notice."

Fred Topel of United Press International gave the film a positive review, calling it "a quirky horror comedy. It has plenty of gore and violence for horror hounds, but also a surrealist heart."

Simon Abrams of TheWrap gave the film a negative review and wrote, "The gags in The Loneliest Boy in the World also tend to be so broad and lazy that it's hard to imagine how this movie's retro-bait sensibility will appeal to anyone other than the targets of this poisoned-apple crowdpleaser's toothless criticism."

Meagan Navarro of Bloody Disgusting awarded the film three skulls out of five and wrote, "It's a simple yet charming story that uses the sitcom format to satirize the nuclear family while offering the protagonist a chance for growth through escapism. The cute zombie comedy makes for an on-the-nose means of coping with death".
