= Everybody's Talking About Jamie =

Musical

- West End promotional poster
- Music: Dan Gillespie Sells
- Lyrics: Tom MacRae
- Book: Tom MacRae
- Basis: Jamie: Drag Queen at 16 by Jenny Popplewell; Jamie Campbell
- Premiere: 8 February 2017: Crucible Theatre, Sheffield
- Productions: 2017 Sheffield; 2017 West End; 2020 UK tour 2022 Los Angeles; 2023 2nd UK Tour; 2023 Mexico; 2024 West End Revival

Everybody's Talking About Jamie is a stage musical centred around a coming-of-age story, with score by Dan Gillespie Sells and book and lyrics by Tom MacRae. The musical is inspired by the 2011 British television documentary Jamie: Drag Queen at 16 directed by Jenny Popplewell. The musical follows and is based upon the true-life story of 16-year-old British schoolboy Jamie Campbell, as he overcomes prejudice and bullying to step out of the darkness and become a drag queen.

== Plot ==
=== Act One ===
Miss Hedge, a careers teacher, asks her noisy year eleven class what they want to be when they get older. One student of the class (16), Jamie New, gets teased about his homosexuality and reveals to the audience all he wants to be is a drag queen ("And You Don't Even Know It"). When prompted, Jamie tells the class he wants to be a performer, but Miss Hedge tells him to get real.

At Jamie's house, his mother Margaret and family friend Ray are preparing for his 16th birthday. When Jamie arrives home, Margaret gives him a card from his dad, with a picture of a race car. Margaret then gives Jamie his gift from her - a pair of red stilettos from Meadowhall. Jamie reveals hesitation about going outside his garden in the shoes ("Wall in My Head").

The next day at school, Jamie shows his best friend Pritti his new heels, and then he is interrupted by Dean, the school bully. He taunts Pritti for being Muslim, and Jamie for being gay. Jamie taunts Dean; embarrassed, Dean leaves. Pritti encourages Jamie to go to prom in a dress ("Spotlight"). Jamie then parades around the classroom in his heels ("Spotlight (Reprise) (Star of the Show)").

At his local shop for drag queen attire, Victor's Secret, Jamie befriends the owner Hugo, and learns all about Hugo's past as a drag queen ("The Legend of Loco Chanelle (and the Blood Red Dress)"). Hugo books Jamie's first drag show at the local nightclub, and helps Jamie choose his dress ("The Legend of Loco Chanelle (and the Blood Red Dress) (Reprise)").

Meanwhile, Margaret meets with Jamie's dad, where she reveals she has been lying to Jamie about his dad, including the fact she has to write a birthday card from him each birthday. Jamie's dad tells Margaret he wants nothing to do with Jamie, claiming he is not a "real boy". Margaret ponders what her life would be like if she never met Jamie's dad ("If I Met Myself Again").

At school, Jamie pulls Pritti into a disabled toilet so she can help with his make-up. They are discovered by Miss Hedge, but Pritti tells her that she is doing Jamie's make-up for an art project. Miss Hedge tells Jamie that he should be proud of being an art project, and walks him around school in the make-up. Jamie, initially embarrassed by the attention, decides to be proud of himself, telling the school that he is doing a drag show at the local nightclub, Legs Eleven, that night ("Work of Art").

Outside Legs Eleven, Jamie bumps into Dean, who calls him a minger. Inside the club, Margaret and Ray have been introduced to a group of drag queens: Laika Virgin, Tray Sophisticay, and Sandra Bollock. Hugo emerges, now dressed as Loco Chanelle, his drag alter-ego. Jamie runs in to tell them all he cannot go on because of what Dean said. Jamie finds the dress he admired at Victor's Secret in his dressing room, with a tag on saying "Love Dad" as well as a flower delivery from Jamie's dad. Loco Chanelle, with the help of the other drag queens, encourage Jamie to find his drag self, whom Jamie calls Mimi Me ("Over The Top"). As Loco announces Jamie over the sound system, Dean and his mates chant 'minger' as we see Jamie in drag. ("Out Of The Darkness").

=== Act Two ===
The next day, the school is buzzing with news of Jamie's drag debut ("Everybody's Talking About Jamie"). Jamie comes into school in bright blue eyeshadow and long eyelashes. Miss Hedge once again tells Jamie to "get real", and Dean taunts Jamie, but Jamie kisses him in retaliation, leaving Dean confused.

At home, Jamie shows Margaret and Ray his new prom dress, now shortened and fitted with working flashing lights. Margaret worries if this is all too much ("Limited Edition Prom Night Special"). The phone rings, and Jamie and Margaret are called to the school.

Jamie, Margaret and Ray go to the school to meet with Miss Hedge, who tells Jamie that there have been rumours that he will be attending prom in drag, and she will not allow it. Jamie is disappointed, and Dean seems to know all about it.

In Pritti's bedroom, Jamie rants to Pritti about how he is not allowed to go to prom in drag. Pritti tells Jamie to go in a dress - not in drag. Jamie says that without Mimi Me, he is ugly. Pritti reassures Jamie that he is far from ugly ("It Means Beautiful"). Jamie reveals that when he was eight, his dad found him in a dress and was angry. He is then confused as to why he paid for the dress and bought flowers if he is not supportive of him as a drag queen. Pritti suggests Jamie should go to his house and speak to him. Before he leaves, Jamie kisses Pritti on the cheek ("It Means Beautiful (Reprise)").

At the house of Jamie's dad, Jamie's dad reveals that he did not know about Mimi Me and calls Jamie disgusting. He tells Jamie he did not pay for the dress or flowers. Jamie figures out that it was his mother doing all of this in his dad's place ("Ugly in This Ugly World").

At home, Jamie argues with Margaret over why she has been lying over all these years. Jamie screams in Margaret's face and storms out. Margaret, left alone, sings about how she will always love Jamie no matter what ("He's My Boy").

Jamie wanders the streets drunk on cider. He is approached by three local boys, and is beaten up as they shout homophobic remarks about him. ("And You Don't Even Know It (Bus Station Reprise)"). Jamie is defended by Hugo, who urges Jamie to go home and apologise to his mum.

Jamie takes Hugo's advice and Margaret and Jamie apologise to each other ("My Man, Your Boy").

At the prom, all of the kids are very excited ("Prom Song"). Pritti enters, wearing makeup and a prom dress. All the girls love it, but Dean decides to bully her. She finally stands up to Dean, and then reveals Jamie, in a white prom dress. Miss Hedge comes out of the school and refuses Jamie's admission to the prom. All the kids stand outside and chant Jamie's name until Miss Hedge gives in and lets him in. Jamie waits until everyone's gone in, and then calls Dean out from off-stage. Jamie encourages Dean to be nice just for one night, to which Dean agrees, and they walk into prom hand-in-hand ("Finale").

As an encore, the cast perform "Out of the Darkness (A Place Where We Belong)".

== Roles and principal casts ==
Character	Sheffield	West End	UK tour	Los Angeles	UK tour and London
Character	(2017)		(2021)	(2022)	(2023/24)
Jamie New	John McCrea	John McCrea	Layton Williams	Layton Williams	Ivano Turco
Margaret New	Josie Walker	Josie Walker	Amy Ellen Richardson	Melissa Jacques	Rebecca McKinnis
Pritti Pasha	Lucie Shorthouse	Lucie Shorthouse	Sharan Phull	Hiba Elchikhe	Talia Palamathanan
Leigh/Ray†	Mina Anwar	Mina Anwar	Sasha Latoya; Shobna Gulati	Shobna Gulati	Shobna Gulati
Hugo Battersby / Loco Chanelle	Charles Dale	Phil Nichol	Shane Richie; Bianca Del Rio (Roy Haylock)	Bianca Del Rio (Roy Haylock)	John Partridge; Kevin Clifton; Darren Day
Miss Hedge	Tamsin Carroll	Tamsin Carroll	Lara Denning	Gillian Ford	Hayley Tamaddon; Giovanna Fletcher; Sam Bailey
Dean Paxton	Luke Baker	Luke Baker	George Sampson	George Sampson	Jordan Ricketts
Laika Virgin	Spencer Stafford	Vileda Moppe (Alex Anstey)	Mary Mac (John Paul McCue)	David O’Reilly	Ky Kelly (Anthony Glyde)
Jamie's Dad (Wayne New)	Spencer Stafford	Ken Christiansen	Cameron Johnson	Cameron Johnson	Akshay St Clair
Sandra Bollock	Raj Ghatak	Vinegar Strokes (Daniel Jacob)	Cameron Johnson	Leon Craig	Garry Lee
Tray Sophisticay	James Gillan	James Gillan	Rhys Taylor	James Gillan	David Mcnair
Becca	Gabrielle Brooks	Lauran Rae	Talia Palamathanan	Talia Palamathanan	Annabelle Laing
Bex	Harriet Payne	Harriet Payne	Jessica Meegan	Harriet Payne	Jessica Daugirda
Fatimah	Courtney Bowman	Courtney Bowman	Jodie Knight	Jodie Knight	Rhiannon Bacchus
Vicki	Kirstie Skivington	Kirstie Skivington	Kazmin Borrer	Kazmin Borrer	Liv Ashman
Mickey	Barney Hudson	Ryan Hughes	Ellis Brownhill	Ryan Hughes	Thomas Walton
Sayid	Kush Khanna	Jordan Cunningham	Adam Taylor	Adam Taylor	Geoff Berrisford
Cy	Shiv Rabheru	Shiv Rabheru	Richard Appiah-Sarpong	Richard Appiah-Sarpong	Joshian Angelo Omana
Levi	Daniel Davids	Daniel Davids	Simeon Beckett	Zion Battles	Luca Moscardini

†The character Leigh in the Sheffield production was renamed Ray for the West End transfer.

The character of Wayne New is not given a name in the stage production; an artistic decision was made to credit actors as ‘Jamie’s Dad’.

=== Notable West End replacements ===
- Jamie: Layton Williams, Noah Thomas
- Margaret: Rebecca McKinnis
- Ray: Shobna Gulati
- Hugo: Lee Ross, Shane Richie, Bianca Del Rio, Bill Ward, Rufus Hound
- Miss Hedge: Michelle Visage, Hayley Tamaddon, Faye Tozer, Rita Simons, Preeya Kalidas, Katy Brand

== Musical numbers ==
Act One

- "And You Don't Even Know It" – Jamie, Miss Hedge & Year 11
- "And You Don't Even Know It Tag" - Jamie
- "The Wall in My Head" – Jamie
- "Spotlight" – Pritti & Year 11 Girls
- "Spotlight (Reprise) (Star of the Show)" – Jamie & Pritti
- "The Legend of Loco Chanelle (and the Blood Red Dress)" – Hugo & the Legs Eleven Girls
- "The Legend of Loco Chanelle (and the Blood Red Dress)" (Reprise) – Hugo
- "If I Met Myself Again" – Margaret
- "Work of Art" – Miss Hedge, Jamie, Dean & Year 11
- "Over the Top" – Hugo & the Legs Eleven Girls
- “Out Of The Darkness” - Offstage Ensemble

Act Two

- "Everybody's Talking About Jamie" – Year 11
- "Limited Edition Prom Night Special" – Jamie, Ray & Margaret
- "It Means Beautiful" – Pritti
- "It Means Beautiful" (Reprise) – Pritti
- "Ugly in This Ugly World" – Jamie
- "He's My Boy" – Margaret
- "And You Don't Even Know It" (Bus Station Reprise) – Jamie
- "My Man, Your Boy" – Jamie & Margaret
- "The Prom Song" – Year 11
- "Finale" – Company
- "Out of the Darkness (A Place Where We Belong)" – Company

=== Orchestration ===
Dan Gillepsie-Sells originally orchestrated the musical for an 8-piece band:

- Piano-Conductor (keyboard 1)
- Bass/Synth bass
- Guitar/Keys 2/Mandolin
- Tenor Saxophone
- Trumpet/Flugelhorn/Piccolo
- Trombone †
- Percussion
- Drums

† For the UK tour production, a reduced 7 piece orchestration was created, removing the trombone part.

=== Recordings ===
==== Concept album (2017) ====
An album titled Everybody's Talking About Jamie (The Concept Album) was released on 15 February 2017 by Wilton Way Records, featuring John McCrea from the Sheffield production. It also included vocals from Sophie Ellis-Bextor, Betty Boo, Dan Gillespie Sells, and Josie Walker.

No.	Title	Length
1.	"Don't Even Know it" (Betty Boo)	4:23
2.	"Wall in My Head"	4:06
3.	"Spotlight"	2:57
4.	"The Legend of Loco Chanel (And the Blood Red Dress)"	4:12
5.	"If I Met Myself Again" (Josie Walker)	3:26
6.	"Work of Art" (Sophie Ellis Bextor)	2:20
7.	"Over the Top"	3:07
8.	"Everybody's Talking About Jamie"	3:36
9.	"At 16"	2:44
10.	"It Means Beautiful"	2:32
11.	"He's My Boy" (Josie Walker)	5:08
12.	"My Man, Your Boy" (Josie Walker & John McCrea)	2:30
Total length:		41:01

==== Original West End cast album (2018) ====
On 27 April 2018, Everybody's Talking About Jamie (Original West End Cast Recording), featuring all West End cast members and tracks from the musical, became available to purchase in CD and online through Broadway Records.

== Productions ==
=== Sheffield and West End (2017–2021) ===
The musical premiered at the Crucible Theatre, Sheffield on 13 February 2017, following previews from 8 February, it finished its short run on 25 February, directed by Jonathan Butterell. The musical transferred to the West End at the Apollo Theatre from 6 November 2017 with most of the Crucible Theatre cast returning.

The show went on hiatus on 17 March 2020 as a consequence of the COVID-19 pandemic. The show returned on 12 December 2020, with social distancing measures being implemented on the audience. The show closed just four days later. The show reopened with social distancing measures still in place on 20 May 2021. The show went on a break from 26 September 2021.

=== UK tour (2020–2022) ===
A UK tour began from 8 February 2020, opening at the Lyceum Theatre, Sheffield starring Layton Williams and Shane Richie reprising their roles of Jamie and Hugo/Loco Chanelle from the West End production. However, in March 2020 due to the COVID-19 pandemic the tour was forced to stop.

In May 2021, It was announced the tour would recommence in Salford at The Lowry on 1 September 2021. Bianca Del Rio played the role of Loco Chanelle at certain venues.

=== Seoul (2020) ===
The Korean production opened at the LG Arts Centre in Seoul from 4 July to 11 September 2020. Four actors; 2AM's Jo Kwon, NU'EST's Ren, Astro's MJ, and musical theatre actor Shin Joo-hyup shared the role of Jamie.

=== Japan (2021) ===
The Japanese production was announced in February 2021. It was announced that the musical will be shown in three cities: Tokyo (July 8 - August 29, Brillia HALL), Osaka (September 4–12, Shin Kabukiza) and Aichi (September 25 and 26, Aichi Prefectural Art Theater). Due to new COVID restrictions in Tokyo the premiere was delayed to August 8. The cast features Win Morisaki and Fu Takahashi as Jamie New. The cast also features long established performers, such as Zen Ishikawa as Hugo, Chizu Hosaka as Ray, Kiyotaka Imai as Jamie's dad and Sandra Bollock and Keigo Yoshino as Laika Virgin.

=== Los Angeles (2022) ===
The musical made its American premiere at the Ahmanson Theatre in Los Angeles from 16 January to 20 February 2022. Layton Williams and Bianca Del Rio reprised their roles as Jamie New and Hugo/Loco Chanelle respectively.

=== Australian tour (TBA) ===
The show was scheduled to embark on an Australian tour from 18 July 2020, at the Sydney Opera House before touring to Sydney Coliseum Theatre (4 to 13 September), The Art House Wyong (1 to 4 October), Arts Centre Melbourne (9 to 25 October), Queensland Performing Arts Centre, Brisbane (13 to 29 November), Canberra Theatre Centre (11 to 13 December), His Majesty's Theatre, Perth (22 to 31 January 2021) and Her Majesty's Theatre, Adelaide (5 to 14 February). However, due to the COVID-19 pandemic, the tour was cancelled.

=== Italy (2022–2023) ===
The Italian production was announced in 2020. The debut took place in 2022 in Rome at the Brancaccio Theater. The first Italian Tour took place in 2023.

=== UK tour and London (2023–2024) ===
It was announced in June 2022 that the production will tour the UK again beginning at The Lowry, Salford in September 2023 until July 2024, starring Ivano Turco as Jamie, who has previously appeared notably in ALW's Cinderella and Get Up, Stand Up! The Bob Marley Musical It will also include a return run in London at the Peacock Theatre from 8 February to 23 March 2024. Everybody's Talking About Jamie's West End revival played its final performance on Saturday the 23rd of March 2024.

=== Mexico (2023) ===
The first Spanish language production of the musical premiered on April 14, 2023 at Teatro Manolo Fabregas in Mexico City. The show was headlined by Mexican singer and TV star Joaquin Bondoni and Guatemalan singer Nelson Carreras, both alternating the role of Jamie New.

=== Sweden (2023) ===
On September 1, 2023, the first Swedish production of the musical premiered at Malmö Opera with Oscar Pierrou Lindén in the lead role, and opera singer Loa Falkman as Hugo.

=== San Francisco (2024) ===
On June 1, 2024, the first non-replica American production premiered at Ray of Light Theatre in San Francisco with Romelo Urbi as Jamie, Anne Elizabeth Clark as Margaret, and J. Conrad Frank (Katya Smirnoff-Skyy) as Hugo/Loco. The show was performed at the historic Victoria Theatre.

=== Poland (2026) ===
The musical had its Polish premiere at Teatr Syrena in Warsaw, opening on September 12, 2026. The production was be directed by Agnieszka Płoszajska, with choreography by Michał Cyran and a Polish translation by Jacek Mikołajczyk.

== Critical reception and accolades ==
The musical received generally positive reviews.

Ann Treneman of The Times, commenting after its West End run had been confirmed, exclaimed "I gave it a very rare five stars. The moment it ended the entire audience rose up as one. I think that it has such an impact for the same reason that Dear Evan Hansen, the musical that just cleaned up the Tony Awards in New York City, is such a success." Later stating that "This is hit material and it so deserved a chance to strut its stuff in Shaftesbury Avenue. Now it's got it."

Clare Brennan of The Observer stated that "the drama lacks oomph but sheer exuberance carries this coming-of-age tale...That said, this is still a touching, funny and joyous production." Dominic Cavendish, in his four-star review in The Daily Telegraph, stated "I can't think of a musical that has set me spinning right round (like a record, baby) quite as much as this funny, outrageous, touching but oh-my-word PC flag-waving show...The show sends you out on a feel-good bubble of happiness. Think about it too much, though, and the bubble gets pricked."

Mark Shenton of The Stage thought highly of the show, commenting "Everybody should soon be talking about Everybody's Talking About Jamie. This new British musical is by turns courageous and outrageous."

=== Original West End production ===
Year	Award	Category	Nominee	Result
2017	Attitude Culture Award			Won
2017	Critics' Circle Theatre Award	Most Promising Newcomer	John McCrea	Won
2018	WhatsOnStage Awards	Best New Musical		Won
2018	WhatsOnStage Awards	Best Actor in a Musical	John McCrea	Won
2018	WhatsOnStage Awards	Best Actress in a Musical	Josie Walker	Nominated
2018	WhatsOnStage Awards	Best Supporting Actress in a Musical	Lucie Shorthouse	Won
2018	Laurence Olivier Awards	Best New Musical		Nominated
2018	Laurence Olivier Awards	Best Actor in a Musical	John McCrea	Nominated
2018	Laurence Olivier Awards	Best Actress in a Musical	Josie Walker	Nominated
2018	Laurence Olivier Awards	Best Theatre Choreographer	Kate Prince	Nominated
2018	Laurence Olivier Awards	Outstanding Achievement in Music	Music and orchestrations by Dan Gillespie Sells, his debut as a musical theatre composer and orchestrator at Apollo Theatre	Nominated
2019	WhatsOnStage Awards	Best West End show		Nominated
2019	WhatsOnStage Awards	Best Original Cast Recording		Won
2020	WhatsOnStage Awards	Audience Award for Best Musical		Nominated

== Live stage recording and film adaptation ==
On 5 July 2018, the musical was broadcast live in cinemas across the United Kingdom and Ireland. It later screened in Australia.

=== Film adaptation ===
In May 2018, it was announced that the musical would be adapted into a feature film. In June 2019, it was announced that the film would be distributed by 20th Century Fox, which would then be acquired by The Walt Disney Company in 2019. After several delays, it was scheduled to be released on 26 February 2021 before it was cancelled and sold the distribution rights (excluding China) to Amazon Studios and scheduled to be released on Amazon Prime Video on 17 September 2021.

The film cast includes Max Harwood as Jamie; Sarah Lancashire as Margaret; Richard E. Grant as Hugo and Shobna Gulati as Ray. Others in the film cast include Lauren Patel; Layton Williams; Sharon Horgan; Ralph Ineson; John McCrea (lead in live stream not film); Samuel Bottomley; Lewis & James Sharp (The Sharp Twins); Ramzan Miah; Zane Alsaroori and Noah Leggott. It was nominated for the BAFTA Award for Outstanding British Film at the 75th British Academy Film Awards.

== See also ==
- List of musicals filmed live on stage
