= Women on the Verge of a Nervous Breakdown (musical) =

Musical

- Broadway Playbill
- Music: David Yazbek
- Lyrics: David Yazbek
- Book: Jeffrey Lane
- Basis: Women on the Verge of a Nervous Breakdown by Pedro Almodóvar
- Productions: 2010 Broadway; 2015 West End

Women on the Verge of a Nervous Breakdown is a musical with music and lyrics by David Yazbek and a book by Jeffrey Lane. Based on the Pedro Almodóvar film Women on the Verge of a Nervous Breakdown (1988), the musical tells the tale of a group of women in late 20th-century Madrid whose relationships with men lead to a tumultuous 48 hours of love, confusion and passion.

The original Broadway production opened at the Belasco Theatre in October 2010, but received mostly negative reviews and closed in January 2011 after 30 previews and 69 performances. It was nominated for 3 Tony Awards and 6 Drama Desk Awards. With new direction and production design, the musical transferred to London and opened at the Playhouse Theatre in January 2015, where it received mixed to positive reviews and 2 Laurence Olivier Award nominations. It closed in May of that year.

== Productions ==
In October 2009, a workshop reading for the Lincoln Center Theater production of the musical was held, featuring Salma Hayek, Jessica Biel, Matthew Morrison and Paulo Szot. Patti LuPone, Tom Hewitt, and Sherie Rene Scott were in workshop readings of the musical in March 2010, with direction by Bartlett Sher.

Women on the Verge of a Nervous Breakdown opened on Broadway at the Belasco Theatre on November 4, 2010, with previews starting October 8. The musical starred Sherie Rene Scott, Patti LuPone, Brian Stokes Mitchell, and Laura Benanti, with direction by Bartlett Sher. Justin Guarini, the runner up from the first season of American Idol, made his Broadway debut as Carlos. The production was a limited engagement that was scheduled to end on January 23, 2011, but due to low grosses and ticket sales, closed early on January 2, 2011. At the time of closing, the show had played 30 previews and 69 regular performances.

The Broadway production featured scenic design by Michael Yeargan, costume design by Catherine Zuber, lighting design by Brian MacDevitt, projection design by Sven Ortel and sound design by Scott Lehrer. Bartlett Sher directed; Christopher Gattelli served as choreographer. Comprising the rest of the creative team was musical director James Abbott and orchestrator Simon Hale. Women on the Verge of a Nervous Breakdown was nominated for three 2011 Tony Awards, including the award for Best Original Score.

A West End production, also directed by Bartlett Sher and starring Tamsin Greig, Jérôme Pradon, Haydn Gwynne, Anna Skellern, and Willemijn Verkaik opened at the Playhouse Theatre on January 12, 2015 for a 20-week run. and subsequently extended its run to 22 August 2015, but on April 23, 2015, it was announced that the production would close on May 23, 2015. Greig and Gwynne were nominated for Best Actress in a Musical and Best Actress in a Supporting Role in a Musical respectively at the 2015 Laurence Olivier Awards.

A production was staged by the Royal Welsh College of Music and Drama in 2023 at the Sherman Theatre, with direction by Eva Sampson.

In 2024, Florida International University produced Women on the Verge of a Nervous Breakdown at The Wertheim, under the direction of Olivia de Guzman, to be the premier offering of its new Musical Theater program.

== Synopsis ==
Act I

Spain, 1987. In an answering machine, a lover's voice in the night asks – ‘Pepa? Pepa, are you there? Is there any good way to say goodbye...’ A woman startles awake and rushes to the phone, ‘Ivan? Ivan?’ She's too late, he's gone.

As day breaks, the city and its inhabitants come to life, and the ubiquitous and philosophical Mambo Taxi Driver sings of a place and time of joy and passion, a world where an entire life can be rewritten in one day ("Madrid"). Pepa, a working actress and singer, arrives at a film recording studio, where she is scheduled to dub a duet with Ivan. Still reeling from his message and hoping to get some answers, she is disappointed to learn he has already laid down his vocal tracks and gone. As she sings to his recorded voice, we hear her thoughts, the conversation she would have with Ivan if only he were there ("Lie To Me"), and she faints from the emotion of the song. A doctor is called, and Pepa admits she has been experiencing some morning sickness for the past few weeks. The doctor insists on running some tests just to be sure. Pepa protests. There's only one thing that's wrong with her, and it's an ailment that seems to be affecting every woman in town ("Lovesick"). Pepa sets off to find Ivan at his apartment and learns that he hasn't slept there in weeks. She leaves a card to let him know she was there, but it is quickly snatched away by a mysterious woman. Aided by the Mambo Taxi Driver, Pepa pursues her through the streets.

The woman is Lucia Beltran, Ivan's ex-wife, who is suing him for his desertion of her twenty years before and her resulting time in a mental facility. Back in her apartment, Lucia goes through a trunk full of memories - letters, clothes, and an old record ("Time Stood Still") which take her back to a happier time full of hope. Lucia is brought back to the present by the appearance by her shy, stammering son Carlos, and his unhappy, frustrated fiancée Marisa. They inform Lucia they will begin looking for apartments tomorrow in anticipation of their upcoming wedding. Furious at being abandoned once again, Lucia throws Carlos' suitcases out into the night. As Carlos and Marisa gather their things from the street below, they question their relationship and their future together ("My Crazy Heart"). The next morning, Pepa returns home to an answering machine full of messages from her best friend, the fashion model and eternal romantic Candela, who has finally found the perfect man, except for one small hitch: he just may be an international terrorist ("Model Behavior"). Pepa wanders her penthouse apartment and remembers the life she shared there with Ivan ("Island"). Meanwhile, back in his old studio, Ivan is packing to leave town, when he receives a visit from Carlos. Torn between his mother and his fiancée, the young man receives a lesson from his golden-voiced father about how to communicate with women ("The Microphone").

Pepa is about to reach the end of her rope. She prepares a batch of gazpacho laced with sedatives in anticipation of Ivan's return. She is interrupted by the arrival of Candela, seeking refuge from both the terrorists and the police, and by Carlos and Marisa, who through a series of mix-ups have found Pepa's address on their list of apartments for rent. As their disparate lives and stories begin to come together, the women are all starting to come apart. Pepa learns that Ivan is leaving town with another woman. Marisa realizes her future with Carlos is about to slip away. Candela, trapped, terrified (and, unable to get Pepa's attention in any other way) jumps off the penthouse terrace. Just as it seems things can't get any more complicated, the doctor announces Pepa's test results: she's pregnant ("On The Verge").

Act II

Sometime during the intermission, Candela has changed her mind; she can't go through with it. Pepa and Carlos pull her back to safety. Shaken and upset, Candela tells them of her tormented infatuation with the wild and romantic Malik. (As soon as she saw the grenade belt, she "knew something was up".) Now the police are searching for him and she is afraid she'll be arrested for harboring the fugitive. Carlos suggests they talk to his mother's attorney, Paulina Morales. Noticing Carlos' attraction to the beautiful and fragile Candela, Marisa retreats to the kitchen, where she unknowingly drinks the sedative-laced gazpacho and passes out, as Pepa heads off to get the attorney's help. Outside her building, Pepa has a moment alone, as she considers the news of her pregnancy through memories of her own mother ("Mother's Day"). She is joined by her pious Concierge, who senses Pepa's troubles and tries to reassure her that things have a way of working out – ‘Sometimes you think you're praying for one thing, but God knows better.’ As she heads toward the lawyer's office, Pepa is unaware the woman Ivan is involved with is the same woman she is about to meet - Paulina. Although she tries to resist Ivan's pleas to go away with him, he eventually seduces her with his philosophy of eternal love ("Yesterday, Tomorrow, And Today"). Pepa arrives to see Paulina and is confused by the attorney's hostile reception and refusal to help Candela. Meanwhile, back at the apartment, Carlos and Candela find themselves growing closer.

They discover a note outlining Malik's plans for an attack on the main courthouse and anonymously call the police to warn them, as the various characters all try to sort out the mess of their intertwining lives ("Tangled"). At the courthouse, Lucia is heard presenting her petition against Ivan to the Magistrates. She demands that her story must be heard ("Invisible"). As she becomes more unraveled, her case is dismissed, and she realizes she has been left with only one solution - she must find a way to make Ivan disappear for good. Pepa returns home and informs Candela that their only safe recourse is to leave town for a while. Besides, there is nothing more for her here ("Island" (reprise)). Just as she and Candela are about to go, the police arrive, having traced the anonymous phone tip to Pepa's number. Lucia arrives as well in search of Ivan and demanding to know where he is. Pepa puts the pieces together and realizes he is at the courthouse, about to run off with Paulina. She tries to go after them, but is stopped by the two officers. Pepa concedes and graciously offers them each a glass of the sedative-laced gazpacho. They pass out, and before Pepa can stop her, Lucia grabs the police officers' guns and heads off to the courthouse to kill Ivan. A chase ensues, with Pepa arriving just in time to warn Ivan and save him from Lucia's gunshot. (The bullet providentially wounded Malik, turning Lucia into a national heroine.)

Ivan thanks Pepa and realizes how much he really cares for her. All he wants is for the two of them to go home and pretend this day never happened ("Lie To Me" (reprise)). Pepa does want that, but recalls her Concierge's words from earlier. She kisses Ivan goodbye and exits. Pepa returns home and is greeted by her Concierge, who tells Pepa she has been praying for her all day. Pepa smiles; she thinks it may have worked. She heads upstairs to begin her new life, as the women gather together and joyfully look toward the future ("Shoes From Heaven").

== Musical numbers ==
Act I

- Overture
- "Madrid Is My Mama" – Taxi Driver and Ensemble
- "Lie to Me" – Pepa and Ivan
- "Lovesick" – Pepa and Ensemble
- "Time Stood Still" – Lucia
- "My Crazy Heart" – Taxi Driver, Carlos, Marisa and Ensemble
- "Model Behavior" – Candela
- "Island" – Pepa
- "The Microphone" – Ivan and Carlos
- "On the Verge" – Lucia, Pepa, Candela, Marisa and the Women

Act II

- "Mother's Day" – Pepa
- "Yesterday, Tomorrow, and Today" – Ivan
- "Tangled" – Taxi Driver, Carlos, Candela, Ivan, Pepa, Paulina, Ana and Ambite
- "Invisible" – Lucia
- "Island" (Reprise) – Pepa, Candela and Carlos
- "Marisa / The Chase" – Marisa and Ensemble
- "Lie to Me" (Reprise) – Ivan
- "Shoes from Heaven" – Pepa's Concierge, Pepa and Women

== Casts ==
Character	Broadway	West End	Netherlands
Character	2010	2014	2019
Pepa	Sherie Rene Scott	Tamsin Greig	Willemijn Verkaik
Ivan	Brian Stokes Mitchell	Jérôme Pradon	Edwin Jonker
Lucia	Patti LuPone	Haydn Gwynne	Lone van Roosendaal
Paulina	De'Adre Aziza	Willemijn Verkaik	Eva Poppink
Marisa	Nikka Graff Lanzarone	Seline Hizli	Desi van Doeveren
Concierge	Mary Beth Peil	Sarah Moyle	—N/a
Taxi Driver	Danny Burstein	Ricardo Afonso	Dick Cohen
Carlos	Justin Guarini	Haydn Oakley	Guido Spek
Candela	Laura Benanti	Anna Skellern	Cystine Carreon
Cristina	Jennifer Sánchez	Rebecca McKinnis	—N/a

== Recordings ==
An original Broadway cast recording was released by Ghostlight Records on May 10, 2011. Prior to that, the recording was released on the iTunes Store on April 18, 2011.

The recording includes two songs that were not featured in the Broadway production of the show: "Shoes From Heaven" (which was the finale in previews) and the original chorus version of "My Crazy Heart" (which opened the show during previews). "Marisa/The Chase" and the reprise of "Lie to Me" were not recorded for the album.

An album of the 2015 West End production was recorded and was made available on Yazbek's website for streaming.

== Response ==
The show baffled critics. It was panned by Ben Brantley writing in The New York Times "Packed with talent and creativity, and a cast and crew bristling with Tony Awards, Women on the Verge of a Nervous Breakdown is nonetheless a sad casualty of its own wandering mind...It keeps changing directions the way a teenage girl changes clothes before a first date. No sooner does this Lincoln Center Theater production start to develop a character or land a joke or sell a song than it switches gears and races on to another person or plot point or number that is, in turn, left incomplete."

== Awards and nominations ==
Broadway Production

Year	Award Ceremony	Category	Nominee	Result
2011	Tony Award	Best Original Score	David Yazbek	Nominated
2011	Tony Award	Best Performance by a Featured Actress in a Musical	Laura Benanti	Nominated
2011	Tony Award	Best Performance by a Featured Actress in a Musical	Patti LuPone	Nominated
2011	Drama Desk Award	Outstanding Actress in a Musical	Sherie Rene Scott	Nominated
2011	Drama Desk Award	Outstanding Featured Actor in a Musical	Brian Stokes Mitchell	Nominated
2011	Drama Desk Award	Outstanding Featured Actress in a Musical	Laura Benanti	Won
2011	Drama Desk Award	Outstanding Featured Actress in a Musical	Patti LuPone	Nominated
2011	Drama Desk Award	Outstanding Orchestrations	Simon Hale	Nominated
2011	Drama Desk Award	Outstanding Music	David Yazbek	Nominated
2011	Outer Critics Circle Award	Outstanding New Broadway Musical		Nominated
2011	Outer Critics Circle Award	Outstanding Featured Actress in a Musical	Laura Benanti	Won
2011	Outer Critics Circle Award	Outstanding Featured Actress in a Musical	Patti LuPone	Nominated
2011	Outer Critics Circle Award	Outstanding New Score	David Yazbek	Nominated
2011	Drama League Awards	Distinguished Performance	Laura Benanti	Nominated

West End Production

Year	Award Ceremony	Category	Nominee	Result
2015	Olivier Award	Best Actress in a Musical	Tamsin Greig	Nominated
2015	Olivier Award	Best Actress in a Supporting Role in a Musical	Haydn Gwynne	Nominated
