= John McCrea (actor) =

British actor and singer

- McCrea behind the scenes of Slippery
- Born: 10 October 1992 (age 34); Aldershot, Hampshire, England
- Occupations: Actor; Singer
- Years active: 2004–present

John McCrea (born 10 October 1992) is a British actor and singer. He was nominated for an Olivier Award for the role Jamie New in the coming-of-age stage musical Everybody's Talking About Jamie, and portrayed Artie in the 2021 Disney crime comedy-drama Cruella.

== Personal life and education ==
McCrea attended Sylvia Young Theatre School, in London and Italia Conti Academy of Theatre Arts. McCrea is openly gay.

== Acting career ==
McCrea had roles in the 2017 film God's Own Country and the 2020 television series Dracula.

In the 2021 film Cruella, McCrea plays vintage fashion shop owner Artie, the first originally created openly gay character in a live-action Disney film. Additionally, he contributed to the film's soundtrack, recording a cover version of The Stooges' "I Wanna Be Your Dog" which he performs on-screen in the film.

== Acting credits ==
McCrea (left) and Perry Williams in rehearsals for Slippery

=== Film ===
Year	Title	Role	Notes
2004	EastEnders: Christmas Party	Choir boy	TV movie
2011	Documental		TV movie
2015	Late Night with Albin and Bibita	Albin	Short film
2017	God's Own Country	University boy	
2018	Everybody's Talking About Jamie	Jamie New	Filmed recording of 2016 West End musical
2019	Our Sister	Dance instructor	Short film
2021	Cruella	Artie	
2021	Everybody's Talking About Jamie	Young Loco Chanelle	Cameo
2021	She Will	Ansel	
2023	Femme	Toby	

=== Television ===
Year	Title	Role	Notes
2004	Kerching!	Robbie	Episode: "1.11"
2005	New Tricks	Boy Alan	Episode: "Fluke of Luck"
2005	Bleak House	Dancer	Episode: "1.8"; uncredited
2006	The Catherine Tate Show	Fergus	Episode: "Lauren Gets Hitched"
2019	Giri/Haji	Tiff	4 episodes
2020	Dracula	Zev	Episode: "The Dark Compass"
2022	We Hunt Together	DC Ryan Parsons	3 episodes
2022	Pistol	Steve Severin	5 episodes
2025	Father Brown	Frederick Thorncastle	Episode: "12.6"; "The Lord of the Dance"

=== Theatre ===
Year	Title	Role	Location
2005	The Sound of Music	Children	The Palladium, London
2017	Everybody's Talking About Jamie	Jamie New	Crucible Theatre, Sheffield
2017–2019	Everybody's Talking About Jamie	Jamie New	Apollo Theatre, London
2022	"Daddy"	Max	Almeida Theatre, London
2023	Cabaret	Emcee	Playhouse Theatre, London
2025	Prince Faggot	Prince George	Playwrights Horizons, New York
2025	Slippery	Jude	Omnibus Theatre, London
2026	Prince Faggot	Prince George	Off-Broadway, New York

== Accolades ==
Year	Award	Category	Production	Result	Ref.
2017	Critics' Circle Theatre Award	Most Promising Newcomer		Won	
2018	WhatsOnStage Award	Best Actor in a Leading Role in a Musical	Everybody's Talking About Jamie	Won	
2018	Laurence Olivier Award	Best Actor in a Leading Role in a Musical	Everybody's Talking About Jamie	Nominated	
2026	Fringe Theatre Award	Best Duo Performance (Play)	Slippery	Nominated	
2026	Drama League Award	Distinguished Performance	Prince Faggot	Nominated	
2026	Dorian Award	Outstanding Lead Performance in an Off-Broadway Production	Prince Faggot	Won	

== See also ==
- List of British actors
