= Haydn Gwynne =

British actress (1957–2023)

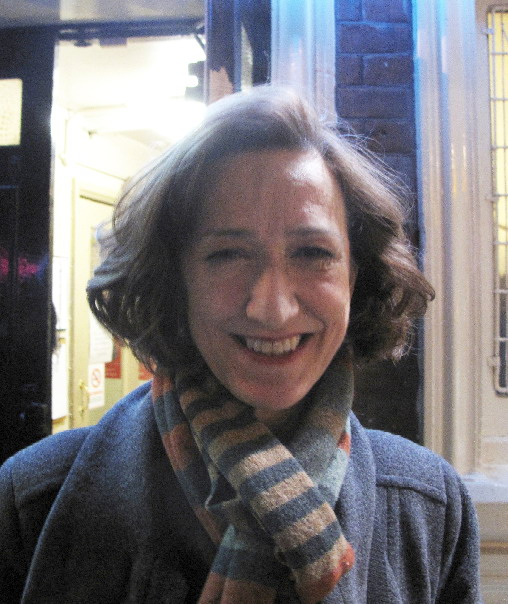
- Gwynne in 2015
- Born: 21 March 1957; Hurstpierpoint, West Sussex, England
- Died: 20 October 2023 (aged 66); London, England
- Occupation: Actor
- Years active: 1984–2023
- Known for: Drop the Dead Donkey
- Partner: Jason Phipps
- Children: 2
- Website: haydngwynne-online.co.uk

Haydn Gwynne (/ˈheɪdən ˈɡwɪn/; 21 March 1957 – 20 October 2023) was an English actress. She was nominated for the 1992 BAFTA TV Award for Best Light Entertainment Performance for the comedy series Drop the Dead Donkey (1990–1991), and won the 2009 Drama Desk Award for Outstanding Featured Actress in a Musical for her role in the Broadway production of Billy Elliot the Musical. She was also a five-time Laurence Olivier Award nominee, winning posthumously in 2024. Her other television roles included Peak Practice (1999–2000), Merseybeat (2001–2002), and playing Camilla in The Windsors from 2016 until her death in 2023.

== Early life and education ==
Haydn Gwynne was born on 21 March 1957 in Hurstpierpoint, West Sussex, to Guy Thomas Haydn Gwynne, also per some sources "Hayden-Gwynne" (died 1994), who ran a printing business and was of Irish origin, and Rosamond Noelle, née Dobson. Her father was a "Barnardo's boy"; he and his twin brother were placed in a children's home as babies. She played county level tennis before studying sociology at the University of Nottingham, and was fluent in French and Italian. After university she took a five-year lectureship in Italy at the University of Rome La Sapienza, where she taught English as a foreign language.

== Career ==
Gwynne became an actor in her mid-twenties. One of her first television roles was as Cosima in the Lovejoy two-part special "Death and Venice" (1986). She played feminist lecturer Dr Robyn Penrose in the BBC television mini-series dramatisation of David Lodge's Nice Work in 1989.

Her first high-profile comedy role was as Alex Pates in Drop the Dead Donkey in 1990. She then appeared in the 1991 Children's ITV science-fiction series Time Riders and later became a regular in Peak Practice, first appearing at the start of series 7 (episode 1) in 1999 as Dr Joanna Graham. The character of Dr Graham was written out of the show at the end of series 9 (episode 13) when she was fatally shot whilst intervening in a conflict between a man and his daughter. After Peak Practice, Gwynne went on to star in Merseybeat in 2001.

In 2002, she starred in the television drama for the BBC The Secret playing the character of Emma Faraday.

Her theatre work included regional and London-based appearances, from the Octagon, Bolton, in Hedda Gabler, to Richard Cheshire's Way of the World appearing in West End productions of Ziegfeld as Billie Burke (1988), City of Angels and Billy Elliot the Musical at the Victoria Palace Theatre, for which she was nominated for an Olivier Award. She reprised her role as Mrs Wilkinson in the Broadway production of Billy Elliot, which opened at the Imperial Theatre on 13 November 2008. Gwynne was awarded the Outer Critics Circle Award, Theatre World Award, and Drama Desk Award for her performance in Billy Elliot. She was also nominated for a 2009 Tony Award, Featured Actress in a Musical.

She also performed in numerous productions for the Royal Shakespeare Company. Her later television appearances were usually in shorter dramas, such as the role of Julius Caesar's wife, Calpurnia, in the TV series Rome. She also appeared in the first Christmas special episode of Midsomer Murders "Ghosts of Christmas Past" (2004) as Jennifer Carter. Gwynne guest-starred in an episode of Lewis in the first of a new series (2008). She appeared in the first episode of series 2, "And the Moonbeams Kiss the Sea", playing the character of Sandra Walters. She guest starred in the BBC TV series Sherlock in the episode "The Great Game" (2010), as a museum curator, Miss Wenceslas. She appeared in the 2011 film Hunky Dory.

She performed at the Almeida Theatre in Islington in a performance of Becky Shaw which ran from 20 January until 5 March 2011. She also appeared in a second episode of the Midsomer Murders series 14, called "Dark Secrets" as Maggie Viviani which aired in Britain in 2011. She starred in Shakespeare's play Richard III alongside Kevin Spacey at The Old Vic in London during summer 2011 as part of the Bridge Project.

In October and November 2012, Gwynne toured in the play Duet for One. In 2013, she appeared as Margaret Thatcher in the premiere of the stage play The Audience by Peter Morgan.

In 2014, she featured in an episode of Ripper Street as a woman living her life as a man to escape what she felt were the horrors of being a woman. In 2015 she starred alongside Tamsin Greig in the new musical Women on the Verge of a Nervous Breakdown, based on the Pedro Almodóvar film, at The Playhouse in London.

In January 2014, Gwynne appeared in the episode "Fraternity" of the BBC forensic science series Silent Witness, followed by appearances in another two BBC series in February: the British sitcom Uncle and the crime comedy-drama Death in Paradise (Series 3, Episode 5). In 2015, she appeared in the BBC Father Brown episode "The Last Man".

In 2016, she starred as Mrs Peacham in Simon Stephens' adaptation of Bertolt Brecht's and Kurt Weill's Threepenny Opera, alongside Rory Kinnear as Macheath, Nick Holder as Mr Peacham, Rosalie Craig as Polly Peacham and Sharon Small as Jenny Diver at the National Theatre in London. In the same year, she played Camilla, Duchess of Cornwall, in the Channel Four sitcom The Windsors, which presents a parodic version of the British royal family. In October 2021, she took over the role of Evangeline Harcourt for the final weeks of the London revival of Anything Goes at the Barbican Theatre. In 2022, she played Susan Hussey in the fifth series of The Crown, also written by Peter Morgan.

In 2023, Gwynne starred as Pam Lee, a version of the real-life judge Prue Leith, in The Great British Bake Off Musical, and as Stanley Baldwin in Jack Thorne's play When Winston Went to War With the Wireless at the Donmar Warehouse.

In 2022, she performed "The Ladies Who Lunch" in a gala tribute to Stephen Sondheim, Old Friends. She was forced to withdraw from the subsequent run of the show, a few days before its opening, in September 2023. At that stage, her withdrawal was attributed to "sudden personal circumstances".

In 2024, Gwynne posthumously won the Laurence Olivier Award for Best Actress in a Supporting Role at that year's ceremony, for her performance in When Winston Went to War With the Wireless.

== Personal life, illness and death ==
Gwynne lived in London with her two sons.

She died on 20 October 2023, aged 66, following a cancer diagnosis one month earlier.

== Politics ==
In August 2014, she was one of 200 public figures who were signatories to a letter to The Guardian opposing Scottish independence in the run-up to September's referendum on that issue.

== Awards and nominations ==
=== Television ===
Year	Award	Award	Work	Result
1992	British Academy Television Award	Best Light Entertainment Performance	Drop the Dead Donkey	Nominated

=== Theatre ===
Year	Award	Category	Work	Result
1994	Laurence Olivier Award	Best Actress in a Musical	City of Angels	Nominated
2006	Laurence Olivier Award	Best Actress in a Musical	Billy Elliot the Musical	Nominated
2009	Tony Award	Best Performance by a Featured Actress in a Musical	Billy Elliot the Musical	Nominated
2009	Drama Desk Award	Outstanding Featured Actress in a Musical	Billy Elliot the Musical	Won
2009	Outer Critics Circle Award	Outstanding Featured Actress in a Musical	Billy Elliot the Musical	Won
2009	Theatre World Award		Billy Elliot the Musical	Honoree
2015	Laurence Olivier Award	Best Actress in a Supporting Role in a Musical	Women on the Verge of a Nervous Breakdown	Nominated
2017	Laurence Olivier Award	Best Actress in a Supporting Role in a Musical	The Threepenny Opera	Nominated
2024	Laurence Oliver Award	Best Actress in a Supporting Role	When Winston Went to War with the Wireless	Won
