= Shobna Gulati =

English actor (born 1966)

Shobna Gulati MBE DL
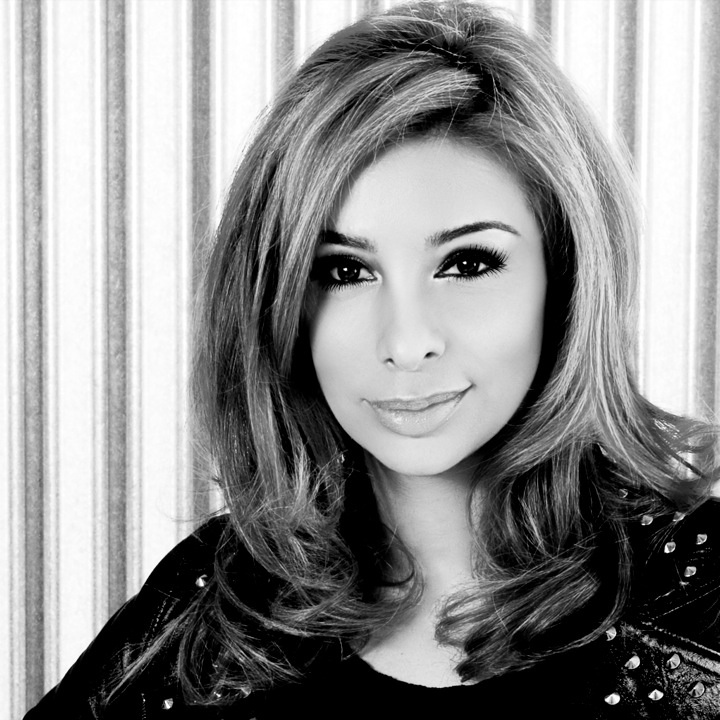
- Gulati in 2012
- Born: 7 August 1966 (age 60); Oldham, England
- Occupations: Actor; presenter; writer
- Years active: 1991–present
- Known for: Dinnerladies; Coronation Street; Doctor Who; Hullraisers
- Spouse: Anshu Srivastava (m. 1990; div. 1994)
- Children: 1

Shobna Gulati (born 7 August 1966) is an English actor and presenter. Gulati is known for playing Anita in dinnerladies and Sunita Alahan in the soap opera Coronation Street from 2001 to 2013. They also played Mari Hoff in the 2006 UK Tour of The Rise and Fall of Little Voice. From 2013 to 2014, Gulati appeared as a panellist on the lunchtime talk show Loose Women. They took over the role of Ray in the West End production of Everybody's Talking About Jamie in 2019 and also reprised the role for the film adaptation. Most recently, they played the role of Nima in Hullraisers and reprised the role of Ray in Everybody's Talking About Jamie for its 2023–2024 UK and Ireland Tour.

Gulati was appointed Member of the Order of the British Empire (MBE) in the 2024 Birthday Honours for services to the cultural industries.

== Early life ==
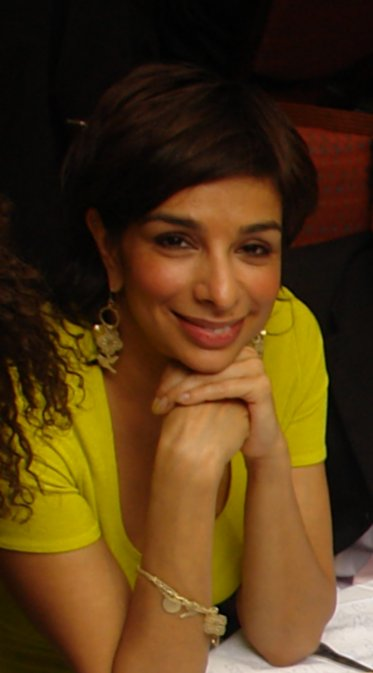
Shobna Gulati in 2007

Gulati was born in Oldham to Punjabi Hindu parents. Gulati was raised a Hindu, and married in a Hindu ceremony.

Gulati grew up in Openshaw, Manchester, and became friends with actress Sarah Lancashire. Gulati has a degree in Arabic and Middle Eastern politics from the University of Manchester, followed by a post-graduate degree in dance.

== Career ==
One of Gulati's earliest appearances was as a dancer in the video for Boy George's 1991 single "Bow Down Mister". In the late 1990s, they appeared in both series of Victoria Wood's BBC sitcom dinnerladies. They appeared as Ameena Badawi from October to December 2000 in EastEnders. They appeared in Coronation Street as Sunita and in the same role in "East Street", a crossover between both soaps, as part of the 2010 Children In Need telethon. In 2001, they appeared in the short film Shadowscan, directed by Tinge Krishnan, which won a Bafta Award and, in 2004, was nominated for a Manchester Evening News theatre award for their work in the play Dancing Within Walls, which was staged at the Contact Theatre in Manchester.

Gulati has also appeared on the TV quiz shows Call My Bluff, Have I Got News for You, The Weakest Link, Russian Roulette and as Diana Ross in Celebrity Stars in Their Eyes. In early 2006, Gulati took part in the Reality TV series Soapstar Superstar.

After Gulati left Coronation Street for the first time in 2006, they played Nisha Clayton, a regular role in the final series of Where the Heart Is, and made appearances in New Street Law and the one-off comedy drama Magnolia, which was written by Dave Spikey for BBC's Comedy Playhouse series.

In October 2006, Gulati appeared at the Royal Albert Hall as part of a short skit featured in The Secret Policeman's Ball. In the sketch, Gulati and their co-star Nitin Ganatra play a holidaying couple who are under the mistaken belief Guantanamo Bay is a holiday resort. The sketch also starred the American actors Chevy Chase and Seth Green.

Gulati was one of the storytellers in a CBBC revival of Jackanory and in the UK tour of the hit play Girls Night by Louise Roche. They also appeared on the Channel 4 special Empire's Children, tracing her family's history during the partition of India. In summer 2007, they appeared in Pretend You Have Big Buildings at the Royal Exchange, Manchester.

In 2008, Gulati made their debut as a filmmaker, producing the short film Akshay for the motiroti's 60x60 Secs. This was shortlisted for the Satyajit Ray short film awards. During this same period, they returned to their Coronation Street role as Sunita Alahan, where they stayed for three years.

On 11 June 2009, Gulati appeared in the BBC1 programme Celebrity MasterChef. They performed in the first stage tour of dinnerladies in early 2009 and they have appeared as a guest story teller for Bedtime Stories on CBBC. Gulati made their Loose Women debut on 18 November 2010 to celebrate 50 years of Coronation Street, appearing with regulars Kate Thornton, Sherrie Hewson and Carol McGiffin. Gulati returned to the show on 11 April 2012 appearing alongside regulars Andrea McLean, Jane McDonald and Janet Street-Porter during soap week. Gulati returned to the show as a regular from 13 March 2013, taking over from Sally Lindsay who took time off to film Mount Pleasant, from September 2013, Gulati became an occasional panellist on the show, before leaving on 30 May 2014.

In June 2011, Gulati was a guest on Countdown. Announcing their departure from Coronation Street, they expressed their desire to write and perform more comedy than their work in a soap opera had permitted them time to do. In 2016, they appeared in the ITV/Netflix series Paranoid. Gulati made a guest appearance in Casualty on 29 October 2016.

In 2017, they appeared as Saba in the British romantic comedy film Finding Fatimah. In 2018, Gulati appeared in the Doctor Who episodes "Arachnids in the UK" and "Demons of the Punjab" as Najia Khan, mother of The Doctor's companion Yaz Khan.

Gulati played Ray in the West End production of Everybody's Talking About Jamie at the Apollo Theatre in 2018. Now adapted as a screenplay, Gulati played the part of Ray alongside Sarah Lancashire. Everybody's Talking About Jamie was released on 17 September 2021. In 2022, they led the company of The Rise and Fall of Little Voice as Mari Hoff, and starred in the show alongside their son Akshay. Gulati reprised the role of Ray in the 2023-2024 UK and Ireland Tour of Everybody's Talking About Jamie.

Gulati wrote a memoir titled Remember Me? on losing a parent to dementia based on her experiences caring for their mother, who died in 2019. During publicity interviews for the book, Gulati revealed that they had contracted Coronavirus earlier in 2020.

In May 2021, Gulati starred as Vicky in the three-part comedy drama murder mystery series, Murder, They Hope.

In December 2022, Gulati appeared as Posy in the Christmas special of BBC dark comedy Inside No. 9, "The Bones of St Nicholas". In September 2025, Gulati was announced to appear in the seventh series of RuPaul's Drag Race UK as a special celebrity guest during a makeover challenge (episode "The Hun Makeover").

== Personal life ==
Gulati is the child of K. A. Gulati who arrived in Oldham from Bombay, India, in 1960. They have a younger brother, Rajesh, and two older sisters, Sushma and Hema.

Gulati married the architect Anshu Srivastava in a Hindu ceremony on 10 November 1990; the couple divorced in May 1994. Gulati lived separately from their husband and became pregnant. From 1999 to 2003, they were in a relationship with the ex-Emmerdale actor Gary Turner.

Gulati has a working knowledge of six languages and is a vocal supporter of Asian women's rights and various anti-racism campaigns. Gulati works on female body image issues, despite not identifying as a woman themselves. Shobna is a supporter and a season ticket holder of Manchester United.

In 2015, Gulati was appointed as a deputy lieutenant of Greater Manchester. This gives them the right to use the Post Nominal Letters "DL" for life.

In March 2025, during an interview on Kaye Adams' How to Be 60 podcast, Gulati came out as non-binary, and revealed they were in a relationship, as well as confirming their use of they/them pronouns.

=== Shafilea Ahmed ===
Gulati was asked to help a murder hunt in December 2004 following the murder of Shafilea Ahmed. At a press conference appealing for more information, Gulati read out some of the poems found in her bedroom during their investigations which "were a testimony to her sadness at being caught in a culture clash with other members of her family". After the reading, Gulati said that they believed they showed that Shafilea was trapped between two cultures. "It can be very difficult if you are born here but your parents were not and there can be a lot of cultural issues," they said. "It is a situation facing many young Asian women who are unable to express themselves properly within her families. I feel these words are the sort of style she would use when talking with her friends. If she is out there she should let people know she is safe because there are organizations and individuals who can help her."

Gulati said that they sympathised with the teenager's difficulty in balancing her culture with her upbringing. "She has obviously been unable to express herself in terms of her family and she probably talks like this to her friends, or has written these songs in private."

== Filmography ==
=== Film ===
Year	Title	Role	Note
2001	Shadowscan	Satinda	Short film
2007	Honey and Razor Blades	Shanti	Short film
2010	Ashes	Priyana	Short film
2011	Junkhearts	Beth	
2017	Finding Fatimah	Saba	
2021	Everybody's Talking About Jamie	Ray	
2022	Incompatible	Dr. Banerjee	Short film
2024	Before I Do	Aunty Jyoti	Short film

=== Television ===
Year	Title	Role	Note
1994	What Do You Call an Indian Woman Who's Funny?	Themself	Gurinder Chadha's short documentary focusing on Gulati, Nina Wadia, Parminder Chadha, and Syreeta Kumar
1998–2000	Dinnerladies	Anita	Series 1 & 2; 16 episodes
1999	Hetty Wainthropp Investigates	Café assistant	Television short (part of Comic Relief 1999)
2000	EastEnders	Ameena Badawi	6 episodes
2001–2006, 2009–2013	Coronation Street	Sunita Alahan	674 episodes
2006	New Street Law	Salina Morris	Series 1; episode 8
2006	Where the Heart Is	Nisha Clayton	Series 10; episodes 5–9
2006	Magnolia	Janice	Television film
2008	Coming Up	Maya	Series 6; episode 2: "The Circle"
2010	East Street	Sunita Alahan	Charity crossover between Coronation Street and EastEnders
2013	You, Me & Them	Rachel	Series 1; episode 1: "First Encounters"
2013	The Slammer	Hilda Baton	Series 5; episode 4: "Slammer Symphony"
2014	Doctors	Sujatha Shah	Series 15; episode 187: "The Good Samaritan"
2014	In the Club	Fiona	Series 1; episodes 1–5
2016	Paranoid	Dr. Parcival	Mini-series; episodes 1, 3 & 4
2016	Casualty	Preethi Chhabra	Series 31; episode 10: "Shock to the System"
2016–2017	Doctors	Gina Kasana	Series 18; 4 episodes
2017–2018	River City	Farah Khurana	9 episodes
2018	Hold the Sunset	Desiree	Series 1; episode 6: "Old Flames"
2018–2019	Treasure Champs	Kari (voice)	Series 1 & 2; 28 episodes
2018–2020	Doctor Who	Najia Khan	Series 11; episodes 4 & 6, and series 12; episodes 1 & 2
2019	Moving On	Pauline	Series 10; episode 1: "By Any Other Name"
2020	Adulting	Shona	Television film
2020	On the Edge	Andi	Series 2; episode 2: "For You"
2021	Celebrity Best Home Cook	Themself - Contestant	Episodes 1–6
2021	Midsomer Murders	Shaila Handsworth	Series 22; episode 5: "For Death Prepare"
2021	Going the Distance	Vic	Television film
2021–2022	Murder, They Hope	Vicky	Series 1; episodes 1–3, and series 2; episode 2
2022	My Name is Leon	Salma	Television film
2022	Inside No. 9	Posy	Series 8; episode 1: "The Bones of St Nicholas"
2022–2023	Hullraisers	Nima	Series 1 & 2; 10 episodes
2023	Brassic	Gina	Series 5; episode 5: "The Rat Catcher"
2023	The Serial Killer's Wife	Kiran	Episodes 1 & 3: "Chapter 1" and "Chapter 3"
2025	Vera	Chief Superintendent Khalon	Series 14; episodes 1 & 2: "Inside" and "The Dark Wives"
2025	RuPaul's Drag Race UK	Special guest	Series 7

== Books ==
- Remember Them?: Discovering My Mother as She Lost Her Memory, Octopus Publishing Group (Hachette UK) Hardcover ISBN 978-1-78840-247-7; Paperback ISBN 978-1-914240-58-4

== Honours ==
=== Commonwealth honours ===
Commonwealth honours

Country	Date	Appointment	Post-nominal letters
United Kingdom	9 March 2015 – present	Deputy Lieutenant of Greater Manchester	DL
United Kingdom	15 June 2024 – present	Member of the Order of the British Empire (Civil Division)	MBE

=== Scholastic ===
University degrees

Location	Date	University	Degree
England	1988	University of Manchester	Bachelor of Arts (BA) in Arabic and Middle Eastern politics

Honorary degrees

Location	Date	University	Degree
England	2006	University of Huddersfield	Doctor of Letters (D.Litt)
England	2021	University of Bolton	Doctor of Arts (D.Arts)

=== Career honours ===
Year	Award	Category	Work	Result	Ref.
2003	Race In Media Awards	Best Actress in Serial Drama	Coronation Street	Won	
2004	M.E.N. Theatre Awards	Best Actress in a Supporting Role	Dancing Within Walls	Nominated	
2019	Asian Media Awards	Services to British Television	Herself	Won	
2019	Eastern Eye Awards	Best Actress	Richard II	Won	
