= Max Harwood =

English actor

- Born: Max William James Harwood; 12 September 1997 (age 28); Basingstoke, Hampshire, England
- Education: Urdang Academy
- Occupation: Actor
- Years active: 2021–present

Max William James Harwood (born 12 September 1997) is an English actor. He debuted in the title role of the film Everybody's Talking About Jamie (2021), an adaptation of the stage musical based on a true story. He was named a 2021 Brit to Watch by Variety.

== Early life and education ==
Harwood was born and raised in Basingstoke. He attended Bishop Challoner Catholic Secondary School and then Queen Mary's College for sixth form where he took A Levels in theatre studies, art photography, music technology and history. He took a year-long foundation course at the Guildford School of Acting on a scholarship before going on to graduate from the Urdang Academy in London.

== Career ==
Harwood began his acting career in 2021, when he was cast to play the lead role of Jamie New / Mimi Me in the biographical coming-of-age musical comedy drama film Everybody's Talking About Jamie, which was released in select theatres in the United States on 10 September 2021, followed by a worldwide streaming release on 17 September 2021 via Amazon Studios on Amazon Prime Video. For his performance, Harwood earned a 2021 Digital Spy Reader Awards for Rising Star – Film. He also won Breakthrough Award in the Attitude Awards.

Harwood then starred as Oliver in the horror comedy film The Loneliest Boy in the World alongside Hero Fiennes Tiffin. He also appeared in the shorts Seagull with Paul Cooper and The Call with Adam Ali, David Ames and Oliver Wickham.

In 2023, Harwood appeared in an episode of the Netflix anthology series Black Mirror and played Alan Munson in the prequel play Stranger Things: The First Shadow at the Phoenix Theatre on the West End. Harwood was announced as part of the cast of Dean Puckett's Magpie opposite Tuppence Middleton and Thomas Turgoose, playing David.

In 2024, Harwood was cast in The Lightning Thief: The Percy Jackson Musical as the lead role of Percy Jackson at The Other Palace in London.

== Acting credits ==
=== Film and television ===
Year	Title	Role	Notes
2021	Everybody's Talking About Jamie	Jamie New / Mimi Me	
2022	Seagull	Seagull	Short film
2022	Olivier Awards	Guest Presenter	1 episode
2022	The Loneliest Boy in the World	Oliver	
2023	The Call		Short film
2023	Black Mirror	Julian	Episode: "Joan Is Awful"

=== Theatre ===
Year	Title	Role	Notes
2023-24	Stranger Things: The First Shadow	Alan Munson	Phoenix Theatre, London's West End
2024	The Lightning Thief: The Percy Jackson Musical	Percy Jackson	The Other Palace

== Awards and nominations ==
Year	Award	Category	Work	Result	Ref
2021	Attitude Awards	Breakthrough Award		Won	
2021	British Independent Film Awards	Breakthrough Performance	Everybody's Talking About Jamie	Nominated	
2021	Digital Spy Reader Awards	Rising Star – Film	Everybody's Talking About Jamie	Won	
2022	London Film Critics Circle Awards	Young British/Irish Performer of the Year	Everybody's Talking About Jamie	Nominated	

== See also ==
- List of British actors
