= Tom MacRae =

British screenwriter (born 1977)

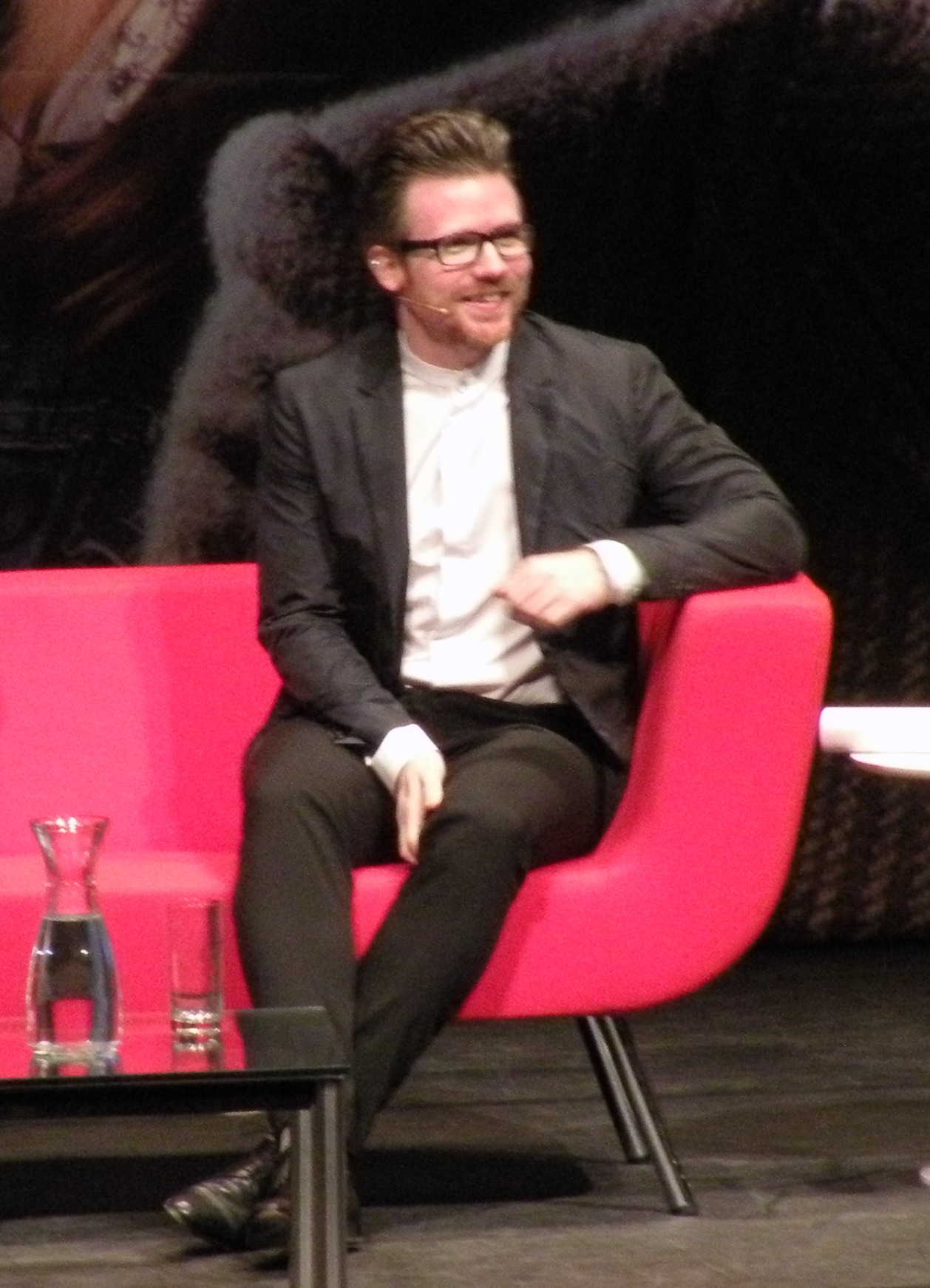
- MacRae at a Doctor Who convention in March 2012
- Born: 6 August 1977 (age 49); Weedon Bec, Northamptonshire, England
- Occupations: Screenwriter, author, playwright, lyricist, television producer
- Known for: Doctor Who ("Rise of the Cybermen"/"The Age of Steel", "The Girl Who Waited"), Threesome, Everybody's Talking About Jamie
- Spouse: Dannie Pye (m. 2017)

Tom MacRae (born 6 August 1977) is an English writer, lyricist and television producer. He is best known as the creator of the television series Threesome and the book writer and lyricist of the Olivier nominated stage musical Everybody's Talking About Jamie.

== Early life ==
The only child of Dianne, an art teacher, and Anthony, an artist, MacRae grew up in Weedon Bec, Northamptonshire and attended Campion School, Bugbrooke.

== Television career ==
His writing for television includes Mayo starring Alistair McGowan; "At Bertrams Hotel" for Marple and "Life Born of Fire" for Lewis; The Lines of War for Bonekickers; and an episode of Casualty. He was nominated for a BAFTA in 2002 for the series Off Limits: School's Out.

For the television series Doctor Who, he wrote the two-part story "Rise of the Cybermen" and "The Age of Steel". Issue 383 of Doctor Who Magazine reported that MacRae had been commissioned to write the episode "Century House" for Series 4, broadcast in 2008; however, this episode was cancelled after Russell T Davies decided that it was too close in tone to another episode. For Matt Smith's Doctor, MacRae wrote the episode "The Girl Who Waited", broadcast in 2011.

That same year, MacRae created and wrote Threesome, Comedy Central UK's first original scripted comedy since the channel was renamed in 2009. It starred Stephen Wight and Amy Huberman as a young couple and Emun Elliott as their gay best friend. A second series has aired.

In 2015, he co-wrote the television adaptation of Raymond Briggs' Fungus the Bogeyman.

Since 2016 he has written several episodes for the television fantasy series The Librarians and its spin-off The Librarians: The Next Chapter.

== Other writing ventures ==
Tom MacRae wrote a picture book for children called The Opposite, which has gone into paperback and been published in several languages. His second book for children, Baby Pie, also received a paperback edition. MacRae also wrote the short stories "Once Upon a Time" and "Cats and Dogs", which were published in Doctor Who Storybook 2007 and Doctor Who Storybook 2008, respectively.

He wrote the book and lyrics to the stage musical Everybody's Talking About Jamie, which premiered at the Crucible Theatre, Sheffield in February 2017. On 21 June it was announced that the musical would transfer to the West End at the Apollo Theatre from 6 November 2017 to 21 April 2018 with most of the Crucible Theatre cast returning. He also wrote the film version, which was released on 17 September 2021 by Amazon Studios. It was previously scheduled to be released on 23 October 2020, by 20th Century Studios, but was postponed due to the COVID-19 pandemic and sold the rights after a January 2021 release was planned but scrapped. It was nominated for the BAFTA Award for Outstanding British Film at the 75th British Academy Film Awards.

In 2026, MacRae wrote the book for the musical Fourteen Again, based on the songs of Victoria Wood, which premiered at the theatre named in Wood's honour in Bowness-on-Windermere in May of that year, later transferring to Off West End theatre the Menier Chocolate Factory between 21 November 2026 and 27 February 2027, and featuring Neil Morrissey.
