= Tashnuva Anan Shishir =

Bangladeshi television presenter

- তাসনুভা আনান শিশির
- Born: Bangladesh
- Occupations: News anchor; actress; model; activist
- Years active: 2021–present
- Employer: Boishakhi TV
- Known for: First openly transgender news anchor in Bangladesh

Tashnuva Anan Shishir (Bengali: তাসনুভা আনান শিশির) is a Bangladeshi transgender rights activist, model, actress and news anchor who became Bangladesh's first openly transgender news anchor on March 8, 2021. She has also appeared in several plays in New York City, such as the Pulitzer Prize-nominated Public Obscenities by Shayok Misha Chowdhury.

== Early life ==
Shishir grew up in a conservative Muslim family, which shunned her when she came out as transgender.

== Career ==
In 2021, Shishir made history as the first transgender news anchor in Bangladesh history. She then appeared in Anonno Mamun's 2021 film Koshai, where she had a small role as a police detective.

She is also known for her appearances on stage. In 2022, she appeared in Shakuntala, a play inspired by the tale of Shakuntala by Sanskrit poet Kalidasa. The show was produced in association with Dhaka Drama at the Jamaica Center for Arts & Learning in Queens, New York. During this run, she found out about a casting call for Shayok Misha Chowdhury's new play. She auditioned and won the role of Shou, an interview subject.

In 2023, she appeared Off-Broadway in New York City in Chowdhury's Pulitzer Prize-nominated play, Public Obscenities, for which she won a Drama Desk Ensemble Award.

== Personal life ==
Shishir is a transgender woman. She identifies as kothi, a gender in Indian culture that does not identify as male or female. In December, 2021, Shishir moved to New York City to receive gender-affirming care and has lived there ever since.

== Stage credits ==
Year	Title	Role	Venue	Ref.
2022	Shakuntala		Off-Broadway, Jamaica Center for Arts & Learning	
2023	Public Obscenities	Shou	Off-Broadway, Soho Rep	
