= Shayok =

Shayok may refer to:

- Marial Shayok (born 1995), South Sudanese-Canadian basketball player
- Shayok Misha Chowdhury, Indian-American playwright and theatre director
- Shayok River, river in the disputed Kashmir region
