= Rheology (play) =

Play by Shayok Misha Chowdhury

- Original language: English and Bangla
- Written by: Shayok Misha Chowdhury, in collaboration with Bulbul Chakraborty
- Music by: George Crotty
- Characters: Misha; Bulbul
- Genre: Experimental theatre

Premiere
- Place: The Bushwick Starr
- Directed by: Shayok Misha Chowdhury

Rheology is a 2025 experimental play written by Shayok Misha Chowdhury, who collaborated with his mother Bulbul Chakraborty. Originally staged at the off-off-Broadway Bushwick Starr theater in 2025, the play moved to the off-Broadway Peter Jay Sharp Theater at Playwrights Horizons in 2026. In both versions, Chowdhury stars alongside Chakraborty, with the play focusing on her work in the titular field of physics, their relationship, and Chowdhury's dread over Chakraborty's eventual death. The play was a co-produced by The Bushwick Starr, HERE Arts Center, and Ma-Yi Theater Company.

Chakroborty received an Obie Award for her performance. The 2026 remount earned Chowdhury a nomination for the Drama Desk Award for Unique Theatrical Experience.

== Plot overview ==
The play begins with Bulbul performing an extended lecture on the subject of rheology, specifically focusing on the classification of sand. During the 20-minute talk, Bulbul uses various different teaching aids—including a chalkboard, video projector, sandbox, and hourglass—and solicits participation from the audience. After moving the sand around in demonstrations, Bulbul is overwhelmed by the developing particle cloud and begins to violently cough. After audience members respond, fearing for her safety, she smiles. Misha interrupts the proceedings from the audience, exploring Bulbul's performance and having her re-perform her death throes in different ways. Misha approaches it as a director giving notes to a performer; Bulbul enthusiastically goes along with the death reenactments as a form of scientific experimentation.

The rest of the play proceeds as a discussion between the two, as actor and director, as teacher and student, and as mother and son. Misha uses Bulbul's scarf as a ghomta, melodramatically promising that he would throw himself on Bulbul's funeral pyre. They act out the heightened scene in Bangla with Misha declaring his decision and Bulbul trying to discourage him, with some bemusement. The scene shifts and Misha is dressed in pajamas. He plays in the sandbox at the stage, finding a sieve and sandcastle toy before eventually digging up the skeleton of a woman. As he does, the hourglass in her laboratory finishes. In response to the implication of her mortality, Bulbul turns the hourglass over to restart it.

In the play's final scene, the projector shows a video of Bulbul's mother toward the end of her life, singing a portion of the Rabindrasangeet, which Bulbul joins in singing. She laments that her mother died while she was still studying and that she hadn't lived to see Bulbul's work as an accomplished physicist or her continued evolution as a person. She relays that feeling to Misha:

One day, you’ll feel that too. You’ll have moments in your life when you’ll be in your element and wish I could see you. And I won’t. You’ll think you can’t live without me. But you will. Like sand, you’ll rearrange. You’ll find new patterns to hold yourself together. And how you will do it, I’ll never know. I won’t be there. I’m a theorist. I gave you the theory. As a playwright, you’ll have to run the experiment.

== Development ==
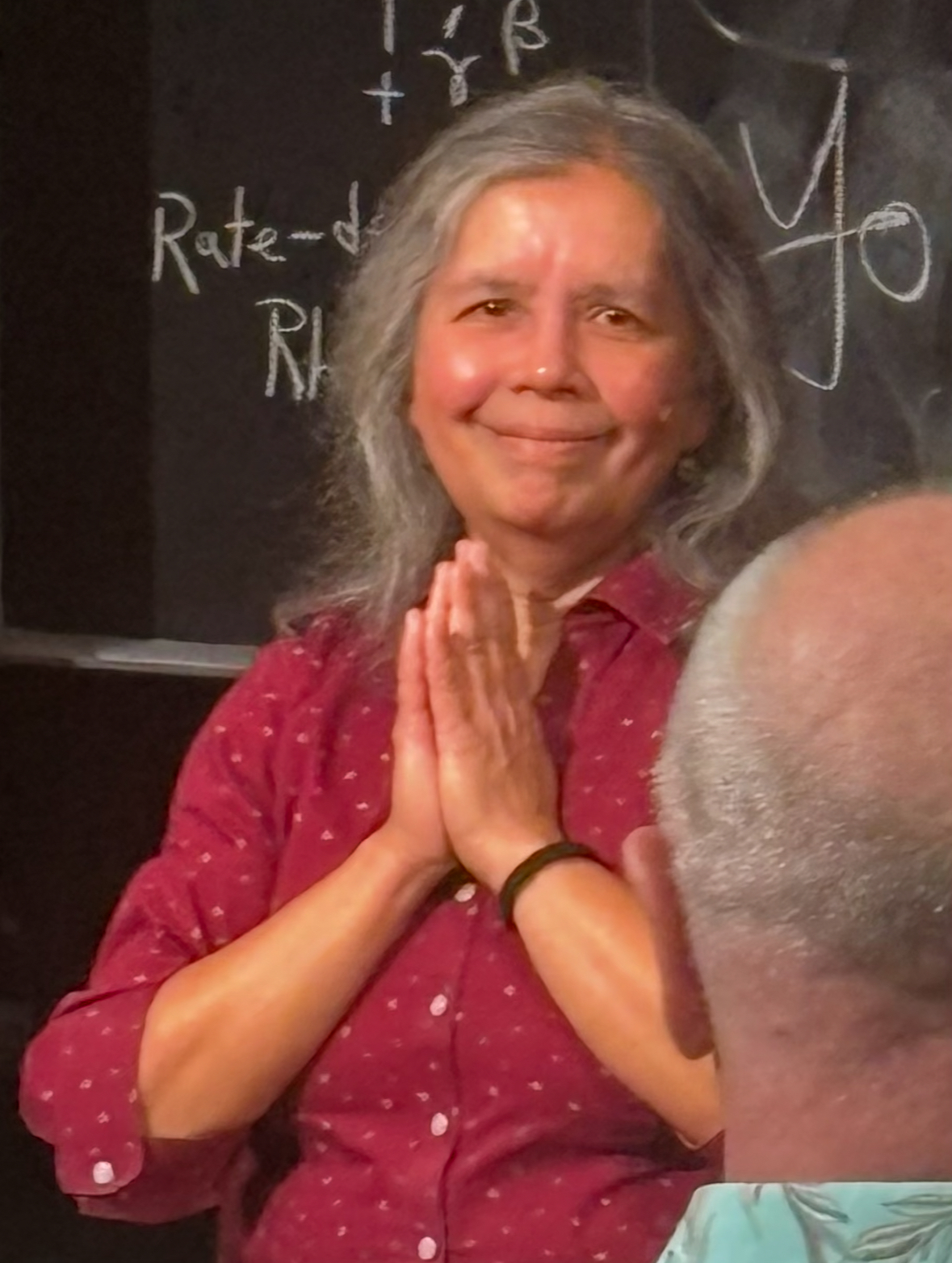
Bulbul Chakraborty on set of Rheology in 2026

Shayok Misha Chowdhury in 2025

The play began as part of Shayok Misha Chowdhury's residency at HERE Arts Center. In the residency, he planned to perform the Rabindrasangeet as a concert with his mother Bulbul Chakraborty, who is a native Bangla-speaker and grew up singing the songs. Chowdhury reconsidered the plan for a straightforward concert in the context of them both aging, worrying about the remaining time the two had together. The play developed from the dread Chowdhury especially felt about his mother's eventual death. The 2023 death of Chakraborty's brother, who inspired Public Obscenities, also influenced the play's development.

Chakraborty had limited experience in theater, but she had extensive public speaking experience giving lectures as a professor at Brandeis University. The opening lecture on sand's fragile properties was written by Chowdhury, but reflects a frequent focus of Chakraborty's academic work. Chowdhury described the connection between the play and both of their professional work:

Much of what my mom and I are doing together in this piece is getting to meet each other’s professional selves, which is a thing that my mom never got to do with her mom. Just to become her colleague for a brief moment in time—it’s a thing that partners, loved ones, rarely get to do with each other.

The play features music by cellist George Crotty. Critic Juan A. Ramirez described the accompaniment as "reminiscent of the melodrama in both Bollywood and in Bernard Herrmann’s film scores".

=== Productions ===
The play first ran at the Bushwick Starr, which co-produced the play off-off-Broadway with HERE and Ma-Yi Theater Company, from April 15 to May 17, 2025. Chakraborty received an Obie Award for her performance in January 2026. The play was mounted off-Broadway at the Playwrights Horizons Peter Jay Sharp Theater from April 14 to May 29, 2026. Rheology received a nomination for the Drama Desk Award for Unique Theatrical Experience and for the Drama League Award for Outstanding Production of a Play. The play also ran for three performances from June 11 to June 13, 2026 at the REDCAT theater in Los Angeles.

== Reception ==
In The New York Times, critic and playwright Juan A. Ramirez applauded the Bushwick Starr version as a promising follow-up to Chowdhury's Public Obscenities, but noted its occasionally "heady" moments. Poet Mansi Dahal, writing in the Michigan Quarterly Review, praised the multifaceted approach, wherein the "grief was grounded in particles and pressure, in equations and entropy. Even with songs in Bangla, even inside the folds of Bengali culture, this reckoning wasn’t spiritual. It was elemental." Helen Shaw favorably compared the play to Nathan Fielder's The Rehearsal.

In a 4/5 star review of the Playwrights Horizon staging for Time Out, Billy McEntee wrote that "the play succeeds because of its deep embrace of death’s antithesis, liveness, both in the introductory lecture [. . .] and the science-inspired explorations that follow." In a mixed review in Lighting & Sound America, David Barbour praised the production design, acting, and some "gorgeously written" portions, but faulted the middle as "at times bizarrely performative". Reviewing the REDCAT version, Charles McNulty wrote that it was an "interdisciplinary experiment that is as playful in its methodology as it is serious in its research aims" and that Chakraborty displayed "a sincerity and collaborative grace that many veteran performers would envy."
