= Drama Desk Special Award =

Award for American Theater works

- Awarded for: Special Award
- Location: New York City
- Country: United States
- Presented by: Drama Desk
- First award: 1976
- Website: dramadesk.org (defunct)

The Drama Desk Special Award is an annual award presented by Drama Desk in recognition of achievements by an individual or an organization that has made a significant contribution to the theatre across collective Broadway, off-Broadway or off-off-Broadway productions in New York City.

The award was first presented in 1976; in 2012, the Drama Desk Award Sam Norkin Off-Broadway Award was added as a component of the Special Award, and those award winners are included in this article.

== Winners and nominees ==
=== 1970s ===
Year	Recipient and Contribution
1976
1976	Hartman Theatre Company
1976	Outstanding Contribution by a New Theatre Company
1976	Queens Theatre in the Park
1976	Outstanding Contribution by a New Theatre Company
1977	—N/a
1978
1978	Off-Off Broadway Theatre Movement
1978	Outstanding Contribution to Theatre

=== 1980s ===
Year	Recipient and Contribution
1980
1980	La MaMa Experimental Theatre Club
1980	Performances by International Companies
1981	—N/a
1982
1982	Jonathan Tunick
1982	—N/a
1982	Ridiculous Theatrical Company
1982	—N/a
1982	The Royal Shakespeare Company
1982	The Life and Adventures of Nicholas Nickleby
1983
1983	WPA Theatre
1983	—N/a
1983	Douglas Watt
1983	Distinguished Achievement
1983	Richard Wilbur
1983	His English Translation of The Misanthrope
1984
1984	Alan Schneider
1984	Serving a Wide Range of Playwrights
1984	Michael Bennett, Joseph Papp and the Shubert Organization
1984	The 3,389th Performance of A Chorus Line
1984	B. H. Barry
1984	Consistent Excellence in Fight Staging
1984	Equity Library Theatre
1984	Showcasing Theater Professionals
1984	InterArt Theater
1984	Nurturing Female Theater Artists
1985
1985	Gerard Alessandrini
1985	Forbidden Broadway
1985	Ridiculous Theatrical Company
1985	Quick Change Wizardry in The Mystery of Irma Vep
1985	Claudette Colbert and Rex Harrison
1985	The Continuing Pleasure of Their Company
1985	Veterans Ensemble Theater Company
1985	Giving Voice to Trauma of Vietnam
1986
1986	Thomas Z. Shepard
1986	Preserving Musical Theatre Heritage on Record
1986	Agnes de Mille
1986	Her Enduring Legacy of Cherished Choreography
1986	Joyce Theater
1986	The American Theater Exchange Program
1986	The New Amsterdam Theater Company
1986	Distinguished Concert Productions
1986	Donald Pippin
1986	Musical Direction and Commitment to Theater
1986	Jessica Tandy and Hume Cronyn
1986	Their Continuing Theatrical Partnership
1987
1987	Stanley Lebowsky
1987	Musical Direction and Commitment to Theater
1987	Paul Davis and Frank Verlizzo
1987	Inspired Art Work for Theatrical Productions
1987	Henry Cohen, Donald Rose and Robert Kimball
1987	Rescuing Classic Broadway Scores
1988
1988	Actors' Equity
1988	75 years of Championing the Professional Actor
1988	Theatre on Film and Tape Archive (TOFT)
1988	The Preservation of Our Theatrical Heritage
1988	Yale Repertory Theatre
1988	Nurturing Plays of Significance
1988	Michael Feinstein
1988	Celebrating American Musical Theater Songs
1989
1989	Paul Gemignani
1989	—N/a
1989	Bernard Gersten
1989	—N/a
1989	Manhattan Theatre Club
1989	—N/a
1989	John A. McGlinn
1989	—N/a
1989	Gregory Mosher
1989	—N/a
1989	Jerome Robbins
1989	—N/a

=== 1990s ===
Year	Recipient and Contribution
1990
1990	The Fund for New American Plays
1990	Support of American Playwrights and Theaters
1990	Jule Styne
1990	A Lifetime of Glorious Theater Music
1990	Kevin Haney
1990	His Makeup for Tru and Other Shows
1991
1991	Brooklyn Academy of Music
1991	Bringing International Productions to New York
1991	James McMullan
1991	Consistently Inspired Art Work for Theater
1991	New Dramatists
1991	Decades of Nurturing American Playwrights
1991	Harold Rome
1991	His Distinctive Contribution to Musical Theatre
1992	—N/a
1993
1993	Early Stages
1993	—N/a
1993	The Public Theater / New York Shakespeare Festival
1993	Puppetry at the Public Theater
1993	RCA Victor Records
1993	—N/a
1994
1994	John A. Willis
1994	Fifty Years of Devotion to Theater and its Artists
1994	Janet Hayes Walker
1994	Twenty-Five Years at the York Theatre Company
1995
1995	Eileen Atkins
1995	—N/a
1995	Otis Guernsey Jr.
1995	—N/a
1995	The Non-Traditional Casting Project
1995	—N/a
1995	Barrow Group
1995	Off-Off Broadway Excellence
1996
1996	George C. Scott
1996	Lifetime Devotion to Theatre
1996	Repertorio Español
1996	Providing Spanish-Language Entertainment
1996	Signature Theatre Company
1996	The Concept of Annually Serving One Playwright
1996	Theatreworks USA
1996	Thirty-Five Years of Entertaining Children and Parents
1997
1997	The Moscow Sovremennik Theatre Company
1997	Into the Whirlwind and Three Sisters
1998
1998	Vineyard Theatre
1998	Quality Work and the New S.P.A.C.E. Program
1998	Arthur Miller
1998	Lifetime Achievement in the Theater
1999
1999	Al Hirschfeld
1999	Lifetime Achievement
1999	Sony Classical
1999	Its Columbia Broadway Masterworks Series
1999	The Actors' Fund of America
1999	—N/a

=== 2000s ===
Year	Recipient and Contribution
2000
2000	Alexander H. Cohen (posthumously), Barnard Hughes and Helen Stenborg
2000	Lifetime Achievement
2001
2001	Reba McEntire
2001	Her Performance in Annie Get Your Gun
2001	Seán Campion and Conleth Hill
2001	Their Performances in Stones in His Pockets
2002
2002	Paul Huntley
2002	Lifetime Achievement
2002	Billy Rosenfield
2002	Preserving Musical Theatre Recordings
2002	Mint Theater Company
2002	Presenting and Preserving Little Known Classics
2002	Worth Street Theater Company
2002	Its Stage Door Canteen Shows at Ground Zero
2003
2003	Brooklyn Academy of Music
2003	Bringing International Works to New York
2004
2004	The Flea Theater
2004	—N/a
2004	Classical Theatre of Harlem
2004	—N/a
2004	Dakin Matthews
2004	Henry IV
2005
2005	Keen Company
2005	Plays That Build Upon Our Theatrical Heritage
2005	The Public Theater / New York Shakespeare Festival
2005	Fifty Years of Exceptional Theater Contributions
2006
2006	BMI Lehman Engel Musical Theater Workshop
2006	Nurturing, Developing and Promoting New Talent for the Musical Theater
2006	York Theatre Company
2006	Its Vital Contributions to Theater by Developing and Presenting New Musicals
2006	Sh-K-Boom Records / Ghostlight Records
2006	Dedication to the Preservation of Musical Theater Through Cast Recordings
2007
2007	John Kander and Fred Ebb
2007	Forty-Two Years of Excellence in Advancing the Art of the Musical Theatre
2007	Austin Pendleton
2007	A Renaissance Man of the American Theatre
2007	Transport Group
2007	Its Breadth of Vision and its Presentation of Challenging Productions
2007	Folksbiene (National Yiddish Theatre)
2007	Preserving for Ninety-Two Consecutive Seasons the Cultural Legacy of Yiddish theatre in America
2008
2008	Edward Albee
2008	His Provocative Plays, Including This Season's Peter and Jerry, Which Enrich the American Theater
2008	James Earl Jones
2008	A Commanding Force on the Stage for Nearly Half a Century
2008	Playwrights Horizons
2008	Ongoing Support to Generations of Theater Artists and Undiminished Commitment to Producing New Work
2008	59E59 Theaters
2008	Whose Imaginative Curatorial Vision Has Created a Stimulating Environment to Nurture a Diverse Range of Artists
2009
2009	Liza Minnelli
2009	Her Enduring Career of Sustained Excellence, and Her Performance in Liza's at The Palace...!
2009	Atlantic Theater Company and artistic director Neil Pepe
2009	Exceptional Craftsmanship, Dedication to Excellence and Productions That Engage, Inspire and Enlighten
2009	TADA! Youth Theater
2009	Providing an Invaluable Contribution to the Future of the Theater.
2009	Forbidden Broadway
2009	Its Satire and Celebration of Broadway

=== 2010s ===
Year	Recipient and Contribution	Ref.
2010
2010	The Cast, Creative Team and Producers of Horton Foote's The Orphans' Home Cycle	
2010	The Breadth of Vision, Which Inspired the Exceptional Direction, Performances, Sets, Lighting, Costumes, Music and Sound That Made it the Theatrical Event of This Season	
2010	Jerry Herman	
2010	Enchanting and Dazzling Audiences with His Exuberant Music and Heartfelt Lyrics for More Than Half a Century	
2010	Godlight Theatre Company	
2010	Consistent Originality and Excellence in Dramatizing Modern Literature, and Especially for the Vibrant Theatricality of its Innovative Productions	
2010	Ma-Yi Theater Company	
2010	More Than Two Decades of Excellence and for Nurturing Asian-American Voices in Stylistically Varied and Engaging Theater	
2011
2011	A. R. Gurney	
2011	His Enduring, Keenly Observed Portraits of American Life Over a Prolific Four-Decade-Long Career	
2011	Reed Birney	
2011	Versatile and Finely Nuanced Performances Over the Past 35 Years, and for His Exceptional Work This Season in Tigers Be Still, A Small Fire and The Dream of the Burning Boy	
2011	The New Group and Artistic Director Scott Elliott	
2011	Presenting Contemporary New Voices and for Uncompromisingly Raw and Powerful Productions	
2011	The Pearl Theatre Company	
2011	Notable Productions of Classic Plays and Nurturing a Stalwart Resident Company of Actors	
2011	Creative Team of War Horse	
2011	Thrilling Stagecraft	
2012
2012	Mary Testa	
2012	Over Three Decades of Consistently Outstanding Work, Including Her Tour-de-Force Performance in This Season's Queen of the Mist	
2012	Nick Westrate	
2012	His Versatility in Unnatural Acts, Love's Labor's Lost, and Galileo was a Highlight of the Season	
2012	New Victory Theater	
2012	Providing Enchanting, Sophisticated Children's Theater That Appeals to the Child in All of Us, and for Nurturing a Love of Theater in Young People	
2012	Stephen Karam (Sam Norkin Off-Broadway Award)	
2012	The Profoundly Moving Sons of the Prophet Confirmed His Status as One of the Most Promising Playwrights of His Generation	
2013
2013	The New York Musical Theatre Festival and Isaac Robert Hurwitz	<
2013	A Decade of Creating and Nurturing New Musical Theater, Ensuring the Future of This Essential Art Form	<
2013	Wakka Wakka Productions	<
2013	Sophisticated Puppet Theater, as Represented by This Season's SAGA, That Explores with Wit, Imagination, and Insight Serious Issues of Our Times	<
2013	Jayne Houdyshell	<
2013	Her Artistry as an Exceptionally Versatile and Distinctive Broadway and Off-Broadway Performer	<
2013	Samuel D. Hunter	<
2013	His Emphatic and Indelible The Whale Affirms His Arrival as a Distinguished Dramatist Who Depicts the Human Condition	<
2013	Maruti Evans (Sam Norkin Off-Broadway Award)	<
2013	His Ingenious Lighting Designs, Reflecting an Exquisite and Bold Theatrical Aesthetic. This Season's The Pilo Family Circus and Tiny Dynamite Confirm His Incandescent Creativity	<
2014
2014	Soho Rep	
2014	Nearly Four Decades of Artistic Distinction, Innovative Production and Provocative Play Selection	
2014	Veanne Cox	
2014	Her Ability to Express the Eccentricities, Strengths and Vulnerabilities of a Range of Characters, and Notably for her Comedic Flair as Evidenced in This Season's The Old Friends and The Most Deserving	
2014	Ed Sylvanus Iskandar (Sam Norkin Off-Broadway Award)	
2014	His Visionary Directorial Excellence. This Season's The Golden Dragon and The Mysteries Exemplify His Bold and Strikingly Original Imagination	
2015
2015	Bess Wohl (Sam Norkin Off-Broadway Award)	
2015	Her writing expresses sensitivity, compassion, and humor with a sure hand.	
2015	John Douglas Thompson	
2015	His exceptional versatility in Tamburlaine the Great and The Iceman Cometh	
2015	Ensemble Studio Theatre	
2015	Unwavering commitment to producing new works by American playwrights since 1968, and enriching this season with productions of When January Feels Like Summer, Winners, and Five Times in One Night. Its Youngblood program fostered and nurtured Hand to God, setting Tyrone off on his devilish path to Broadway	
2015	Andy Blankenbuehler	
2015	His inspired and heart-stopping choreography in Hamilton	
2016
2016	Sheldon Harnick	
2016	New productions of Fiddler on the Roof, Rothschild and Sons, and She Loves Me this season remind us that this veteran lyricist's takes on faith, family and community are as resonant as ever.	
2016	Camp Broadway	
2016	For more than 20 years, this indispensable organization has introduced young people to the magic of theater. Camp Broadway plays a crucial role in creating tomorrow's audiences.	
2016	Danai Gurira (Sam Norkin Off-Broadway Award)	
2016	Whether writing about women in wartime Liberia in Eclipsed or about an affluent immigrant family from Zimbabwe struggling with assimilation in Familiar, Danai Gurira demonstrates great insight, range, and depth, bringing a fresh new voice to American theater.	
2016	Ensemble of The Royale	
2016	The heavyweight cast of McKinley Belcher III, Khris Davis, Montego Glover, John Lavelle, and Clarke Peters gels as a unit in bringing Marco Ramirez's story, inspired by Jack Johnson, to unforgettable life, offering a trenchant statement on racism in America.	
2016	Ensemble of The Humans	
2016	Cassie Beck, Reed Birney, Jayne Houdyshell, Lauren Klein, Arian Moayed, and Sarah Steele spend a very special Thanksgiving Day together in Stephen Karam's play, reminding us that home is indeed where The Humans are.	
2017
2017	Phil LaDuca	
2017	Proving that character comes from the ground up, the designer's innovative flexible dance shoe ensures that hoofers on any stage remain on point.	
2017	Lila Neugebauer (Sam Norkin Off-Broadway Award)	
2017	During a season that saw her helm the original works The Antipodes, Everybody, Miles for Mary, and The Wolves, and resurrect the works of esteemed playwrights Edward Albee, Maria Irene Fornes, and Adrienne Kennedy in Signature Plays, director Lila Neugebauer has shown that her dauntless insight into the human condition knows no bounds.	
2017	Ensemble of The Wolves	
2017	The superbly talented cast of Sarah DeLappe's debut play, Mia Barron, Brenna Coates, Jenna Dioguardi, Samia Finnerty, Midori Francis, Lizzy Jutila, Sarah Mezzanotte, Tedra Millan, Lauren Patten, and Susannah Perkins, jelled as one, proving that team spirit is just a alive on the stage as it is on the soccer field.	
2018
2018	Sean Carvajal and Edi Gathegi	
2018	To Sean Carvajal and Edi Gathegi of Jesus Hopped the 'A' Train whose last-minute entrances into the Signature production of this powerful play ensured it had a happy real-life ending.	
2018	Ensemble of School Girls; Or, The African Play	
2018	To Nabiyah Be, MaameYaa Boafo, Paige Gilbert, Zainab Jah, Nike Kadri, Abena Mensah-Bonsu, Mirirai Sithole, and Myra Lucretia Taylor of School Girls; Or, The African Play, whose characters learn the facts of life but whose portrayers taught us all a thing or two about the way things are.	
2018	Juan Castano (Sam Norkin Off-Broadway Award)	
2018	To Juan Castano, whose varied performances this season in Oedipus El Rey, A Parallelogram, and Transfers not only make a complex statement about American life but also indicate great things to come for this talented performer.	
2019
2019	Mia Katigbak	
2019	To Mia Katigbak, the backbone of the Off-Broadway scene, we acclaim her for her performances this season in Henry VI: Shakespeare's Trilogy in Two Parts, The Trial of the Catonsville Nine, Peace for Mary Francis and Recent Alien Abductions. This award also recognizes her vital presence as the artistic director of NAATCO and her sustained excellence as a performer and mentor.	
2019	Repertorio Español	
2019	To Repertorio Español for presenting a year-round rotating repertory of new and classic Spanish-language plays in its intimate Gramercy venue. For the past 51 years, Repertorio has been an indispensable theater for Spanish-speaking audiences, while inviting non-Spanish-speaking theatergoers to discover the delights of the Spanish-language canon and introducing New York audiences to the work of actors like Zulema Clares and Germán Jaramillo.	
2019	Montana Levi Blanco (Sam Norkin Off-Broadway Award)	
2019	To Montana Levi Blanco, who enriched this season with his vibrant and detailed costumes for Fairview, The House That Will Not Stand, Fabulation, Or the Re-Education of Undine, Eddie and Dave, "Daddy," and Ain't No Mo'. If a picture is worth a thousand words, a Blanco costume is worth considerably more, telling us a complete story about its wearer while giving us something fabulous to look at.	
2019	Ensemble of Dance Nation	
2019	To the uncanny ensemble of Dance Nation for their pointed portrait of a dance troupe driven by competition but fused by the experiences of youth: Purva Bedi, Eboni Booth, Camila Canó-Flaviá, Dina Shihabi, Ellen Maddow, Christina Rouner, Thomas Jay Ryan, Lucy Taylor, and Ikechukwu Ufomadu.	

=== 2020s ===
Year	Recipient and Contribution	Ref.
2020
2020	Mary Bacon (Sam Norkin Off-Broadway Award)	
2020	Continued her versatile career of compassionate, searing work with numerous companies, with two of Off-Broadway's most humane performances this season in Coal Country and Nothing Gold Can Stay	
2020	The Actors Fund, Seth Rudetsky, and James Wesley	
2020	Connecting members of the theater community and lifting spirits during the coronavirus crisis.	
2020	The Public Theater's Mobile Unit	
2020	The current Mobile Unit tours free Shakespeare throughout the five boroughs, including prisons, homeless shelters, and community centers, reminding audiences new and old that the play really is the thing.	
2020	WP Theater and Julia Miles	
2020	The largest, most enduring American company (and its founder) that nurtures and produces works by female-identified creators	
2020	Claire Warden	
2020	For her pioneering work as an intimacy choreographer on recent productions, and her leadership in the rapidly emerging movement of intimacy direction. Co-founder of Intimacy Directors International, contributing to theater experiences that are safer for performers and more authentic for contemporary audiences.	
2021	No awards: New York theatres shuttered, March 2020 to September 2021, due to the COVID-19 pandemic in New York City	
2022
2022	Dede Ayite	
2022	Dede Ayite seems to have costumed half the actors of this theater season with her designs for Merry Wives, Seven Deadly Sins, The Last of the Love Letters, Chicken and Biscuits, Slave Play, Nollywood Dreams, American Buffalo, and How I learned to Drive. Whether dressing working-class Marylanders of the 1960s, amateur criminals of the 1970s, or West African immigrants in today’s Harlem, Ayite has a knack for conveying characters’ means, values, and aspirations before the actors utter a word.	
2022	Heather Christian	
2022	With the category-defying Oratorio for Living Things, Heather Christian aims to encompass all human existence in a single inventive and startlingly beautiful work. In times of pandemic, war, and social upheaval, Christian’s work (directed by Lee Sunday Evans and brought to life by a superb cast and creative team) is an awe-inspiring reminder that, even in the darkest times, there will always be artistic peaks to scale.	
2023
2023	Ryan J. Haddad (Sam Norkin Off-Broadway Award)	
2023	From his standout performance in american (tele)visions, to writing and performing the autobiographical Dark Disabled Stories, Ryan J. Haddad’s work this season has expanded on and interrogated what the idea of “accessibility” really means. Whether riding a shopping cart like a throne, or relating his experiences on a “gay, pink bus,” Haddad shared with audiences an unabashed queer fabulosity that was both unforgettable and deeply human.	
2023	Stephen McKinley Henderson (Harold Prince Lifetime Achievement Award)	
2023	Stephen McKinley Henderson has been bringing in-depth, gripping portrayals of memorable characters to the stage for over four decades. With his return to Broadway this season as Pops in Between Riverside and Crazy, which the Drama Desk Awards previously nominated in 2015, this year’s Harold Prince Lifetime Achievement Award marks Henderson’s role in this powerful production as a celebration of his brilliant career.	
2023	Ensemble of Public Obscenities	
2023	The cast of Soho Rep’s Public Obscenities – Tashnuva Anan Shishir, Abrar Haque, Golam Sarwar Harun, Gargi Mukherjee, NaFis, Jakeem Dante Powell, and Debashis Roy Chowdhury – embodied the transnational world of Shayok Misha Chowdhury’s bilingual play with memorable authenticity, remarkable specificity, and extraordinary warmth.	
2024
2024	How to Dance in Ohio's Authentic Autism Access Team	
2024	Sammi Cannold, Nicole D'Angelo, Becky Leifman, Ava Xiao-Lin Rigelhaupt, Liz Weber, and Jeremy Wein – for their steadfast support of autistic theatermakers, and their strides toward true accessibility for neurodiverse individuals both on and offstage.	
2024	Isabella Byrd	
2024	During this season, Byrd illuminated two Broadway shows done in the round, An Enemy of the People and Cabaret at the Kit Kat Club. Off Broadway, her spotlight on quiet, small-scale stories both enchanted us in Primary Trust and mesmerized us in Infinite Life, with a parking-lot sky that marked the passage of time.	
2025
2025	Ensemble of Liberation	
2025	The ensemble of Roundabout Theatre Company's Liberation (Betsy Aidem, Audrey Corsa, Kayla Davion, Susannah Flood, Kristolyn Lloyd, Irene Sofia Lucio, Charlie Thurston, and Adina Verson) for bringing to vibrant life the specific and universal stories of women staring across the social battle lines of the 1970s from their perch "somewhere in Ohio" in Bess Wohl's beautiful new play.	
2025	Pregones/Puerto Rican Traveling Theater	
2025	Pregones (founded in 1979) and the Puerto Rican Traveling Theater (founded in 1967) merged in 2014 to become a powerhouse producer of Latinx shows on two NYC stages: one in Manhattan's Theater District, the other in the South Bronx, both evoking an atmosphere of warmth and inclusivity. This season brought the blazing world premiere of Matthew Barbot’s the beautiful land i seek (la linda tierra que busco yo), a history-inspired fantasia about two Puerto Rican freedom fighters that deftly explores colonialism while riffing on Waiting for Godot, plus dozens of one-offs showcasing Latinx artists and culture.	
2025	Stacey Derosier	
2025	For her deeply intimate and consistently gorgeous work across this season’s Off-Broadway stages. Whether lighting the minimalist theatricality of The Welkin and Grangeville, or the rich naturalism of The Counter and Danger and Opportunity, Derosier shows us not only that less is often so much more, but also that just a single light can have such a profound impact in the darkness.	
2025	Danger and Opportunity	
2025	The team behind Danger and Opportunity – playwright Ken Urban, director Jack Serio, and ensemble Juan Castano, Julia Chan, and Ryan Spahn – for their genuinely serious, deeply moving consideration of the messy implications of a three-way relationship, done in an imaginatively immersive way that made such a small-scale story feel like a meaningful event.	
2026
2026	Ensemble of Marjorie Prime	
2026	The ensemble of Marjorie Prime (Danny Burstein, Christopher Lowell, Cynthia Nixon, and June Squibb) who palpably tap into the emotions that make us human, even when playing AI versions of their characters, in Jordan Harrison’s prescient play about memory, aging, technology, and grief.	
2026	Xhloe Rice and Natasha Roland (Sam Norkin Off-Broadway Award)	
2026	Xhloe Rice and Natasha Roland for their collaborations on A Letter to Lyndon B. Johnson or God and What If They Ate The Baby?.	
2026	Initiative	
2026	The epic yet intimate Initiative gave us the full high school experience, making five-plus hours in the theater somehow feel like no time at all thanks to the collective of writer Else Went, director Emma Rosa Went and the extraordinary ensemble cast of Olivia Rose Barresi, Brandon Burk, Greg Cuellar, Harrison Densmore, Carson Higgins, Andrea Lopez Alvarez, Jamie Sanders and Christopher Dylan White. Collaborating over almost nine years, the Initiative team tapped into the world of D&D to illuminate the magic that can be found in devoting time to process, showing how the richness of a shared language can conjure community, produce ambitious art, and captivate audiences.	
2026	Diane Paulus and Masquerade	
2026	Diane Paulus, and the outstanding team of creative collaborators she assembled for Masquerade, off-Broadway’s immersive reimagining of Andrew Lloyd Webber, Charles Hart, and Richard Stilgoe’s The Phantom of the Opera that has infused expansive ingenuity into a well-worn tale. Paulus’s “creative workshop” of directors, designers, stage managers, butlers and more has crafted an experience that exemplifies the value of rigorous theatrical collaboration across all departments and disciplines.	
2026	Richard Maltby Jr. and David Shire (William Wolf Award)	
2026	he 2026 Wolf Award goes to Richard Maltby Jr. and David Shire, collaborators ever since they met in college seven decades ago. In addition to their musical shows and witty, insightful cabaret songs, the two have been mentors to countless young theater artists and have devoted enormous time to charitable causes. This season, their revue About Time completed a trilogy that began with Starting Here, Starting Now (1976) and Closer Than Ever (1989), depicting the emotional terrain of youth, midlife, and maturity with poignance and splendid melody.	

== See also ==
- Society of London Theatre Special Award
- Special Tony Award
