= New Georges =

Off-Broadway theater

- Formation: January 1‚ 1992
- Type: Theatre group
- Location: 85 Broad St, New York, NY 10004
- Artistic director: Susan Bernfield
- Website: newgeorges.org

New Georges is a not-for-profit Off-Broadway theater based in New York City, dedicated to developing and producing new work by women, trans, and non-binary artists. Founded in 1992, fSusan Bernfield serves as artistic director, Jaynie Saunders Tiller serves as executive director, and Deadria Harrington serves as Artistic Operations Director.

Awards and honors for New Georges, its plays and its people include The National Theatre Conference's Outstanding Theatre Award, 4 Obie Awards, The Lilly Award, the Susan Smith Blackburn Prize, and the Kesselring Prize.

== History ==
New Georges is a New York-based theater company founded in 1992 by artistic director Susan Bernfield. It is focused on supporting and producing the work of women, trans, and nonbinary playwrights. For more than three decades New Georges has been an incubator for new voices in theater, particularly those from women, LGBTQ+ playwrights, and other underrepresented communities. The company's productions are risk-taking and diversity, both in terms of genre and form. The theater also has a commitment to creating an "inclusive space for artists and audiences."

In addition to its productions, New Georges has run a number of programs designed to support emerging artists. This includes their "New Georges Jam" (a series of events that brings together theater artists to share work in progress) and the "Audrey Residency," which provides space for playwrights and directors to develop new works.Over the years, New Georges has produced a variety of critically acclaimed works, many of which have gone on to be produced in other theaters or published.

== Noteworthy Productions ==
- A Woman Among Women by Julia May Jonas (2024) *co-production w/ The Bushwick Starr
- KARA & EMMA & BARBARA & MIRANDA by Ariel Stess (2024) *co-production w/ The Tank
- Grief Hotel by Liza Birkenmeier (2023, 2024) *co-production w/ Clubbed Thumb & The Public Theater
- PORTO by Kate Benson (2017, 2018) *co-production w/ WP Theater & The Bushwick Starr
- A Beautiful Day in November on the Banks of the Greatest of the Great Lakes by Kate Benson (2014, 2015) *co-production w/ WP Theater
- Nightlands by Sylvan Oswald (2011)
- Creature by Heidi Schreck (2009) *co-production w/ Page 73 Productions
- Angela’s Mixtape by Eisa Davis (2009)
- Hillary: A Modern Greek Tragedy with a Somewhat Happy Ending by Wendy Weiner (2008)
- Stretch (a fantasia) by Susan Bernfield (2008)
- God's Ear by Jenny Schwartz (2007, 2008) *co-production w/ Vineyard Theatre
- Dead City by Sheila Callaghan (2006)
- Three Seconds in the Key by Deb Margolin(2004)
- Anna Bella Eema by Lisa D'Amour (2003)
- None of the Above by Jenny Lyn Bader (2003)
- Self Defense by Carson Kreitzer (2002)
- Leader of the People by Tracey Scott Wilson
- Fishes by Diana Son (1998)
- Tomorrowland by Neena Beber(1996)
- Maiden Voyages by Honor Molloy (1993)

== The Jam ==
The New Georges' "Jam" is a collaborative, artist-led “performance gym” designed for early- to mid-career women+ theatermakers. The Jam blends institutional support with the spirit of a creative collective. Members meet twice a month to share meals, conversations, and works-in-progress, culminating in an annual showcase called the JAMboree, where they present slices of their collaborative projects. According to New Georges, while many exciting new plays are developed through The Jam, "it's the enduring professional relationships built within the group that often have the greatest impact." A new cohort is selected every two years through an open call process.

== Audrey Residency ==
The New Georges' Audrey Residency is a year-long, project-based play development program that immerses artists in the company's wider creative community. Residents—working solo or in collaboration—spend up to three weeks developing a new play in The Room, the company's dedicated workspace. According to New Georges, "Monthly gatherings throughout the year strengthen connections within the cohort and deepen artists' engagement with one another. Now in its eighth cycle, the program has supported 92 artists whose diverse backgrounds, experiences, and artistic approaches reflect the richness of the New Georges community."
