= SAGA (play) =

SAGA is a play written and directed by Kirjan Waage and Gwendolyn Warnock, performed by Wakka Wakka Productions in collaboration with Nordland Visual Theatre. According to Wakka Wakka's website, SAGA features 30 puppets, ranging from 3 inches to 10 feet, portrayed by an international cast of puppeteers from Iceland, Norway, Ireland, and the US'.

== Form ==
The play uses puppets, the puppeteers wearing masks throughout the play to make them look like Icelandic horses. It makes extensive use of recorded sound, along with sound effects produced by the puppeteers themselves, and quasi-cinematic effects like bullet time. There is some use of a diorama of the farm where the play is set, on which the movements of cars to the farm are performed. The play is in English spoken with Icelandic accents. It lasts for about an hour.

== Synopsis ==
The play opens with the puppeteers performing a slow, sinister dance to bagpipe music evoking medieval music, looming over the character who turns out to be the protagonist of the play, Gunnar Oddmundsson. The play then cuts to a scene of Gunnar and his son Óli digging a hole for an outdoor Jacuzzi. The scene is rural Iceland and Gunnar and Óli wear lopapeysur. Gunnar's wife Helga emerges and it becomes clear (partly through this scene and partly later in the play) that Ólafur is preparing the Jacuzzi as part of a scheme to open the 'Viking Bed and Breakfast', tourist accommodation at which Helga is to run a restaurant and Gunnar to run horse and jeep tours. Their conversation is interrupted by the sudden appearance of Geir Haarde making his 'God bless Iceland' speech of October 6, 2008, breaking the news of the unfolding 2008–11 Icelandic financial crisis. Gunnar soon finds himself beset with bills he can no longer pay (literally: they flock around his head, held by the puppeteers). A flashforward shows Gunnar looking in on himself unconscious in a jeep that has crashed into the unfinished Jacuzzi and telling himself to wake up. Meanwhile, flashbacks recount his earlier conversations with his friend at the bank, who glibly encouraged him to sell his fishing boat and fish-quota, invest the proceeds rather than pay off his mortgage, and to take out loans to buy his way into an idyllic pastoral life, purchasing land, a new house, a jeep, horses, and funding Gunnar's putative tourism business. The series of loans in these flashbacks are portrayed as being taken out with a growing tone of frivolity and derangement on the part of both Gunnar and the banker, with Gunnar coming to sign his name as 'Michael Jackson' and 'Elvis Presley' on loan documents, followed by a dance routine. Gunnar is also portrayed in a flashback horse-racing with his son.

Back in the present time of the play, the financial strains in turn strain Gunnar's relationship with Helga: they are shown arguing over whose fault their deteriorating financial situation is. Gunnar meets his lawyer friend Jón and they agree to sue the bank in a narrative that runs through much of the play, implying that Jón becomes Gunnar's best or even only friend, but never with success. Gunnar participates in the Kitchenware Revolution, facing the police's use of tear gas of January 22, 2009 and his jubilation at the resignation of the government on January 26 is represented by the puppeteers performing an energetic dance with Icelandic flags to the soundtrack of Emilíana Torrini's 2009 hit Jungle Drum.

The revolution does not, however, help Gunnar's financial situation; while shearing sheep with Óli, he is visited by the local sheriff who serves an eviction notice: Gunnar's house is to be repossessed and put up for auction. Helga moves to Norway to take a job in a restaurant there, taking Óli with her. The backstory of her relationship with Gunnar is explored as a flashback to their first meeting, drunk, outside a bar, involving a graphic representation of drunken outdoor sex, during which Helga implicitly gets pregnant with Óli, on the occasion of whose birth Gunnar proposes marriage to Helga, which she accepts. After two months in Norway, Helga calls Gunnar asking for a divorce. Gunnar sells his horses at a knock-down price to be able to buy a plane ticket to Norway to try to save the marriage but is thwarted by the 2010 eruptions of Eyjafjallajökull and their consequent disruption of air traffic. Gunnar's rage provokes the appearance of a representation of his inner Viking, depicted as a huge, bald, black-haired, axe-wielding figure reminiscent of Egill Skallagrímsson, and a fantasy of raising a Níðstöng against his oppressors followed by a homicidal, spade-wielding rampage against them. Gunnar does not, however, follow through on this, instead chasing the Viking away. However, he does not vacate his house ahead of the auction as he is supposed to, and chases away a prospective buyer. A few days later, the day before the auction, the auctioneer brings a policeman to the house to ask Gunnar to leave; Gunnar promises to and the policeman pretends that Gunnar already has. Inspired by his inner Viking, however, Gunnar instead pours petrol around the inside of the house and sets fire to it before driving the jeep into the unfinished Jacuzzi. His is knocked unconscious by the crash, but wakes up, climbs out, and calls Jón asking for help. Jón is not shown to appear, however, and the play closes with Gunnar lying beside the crashed car surrounded by the sinister figures of the puppeteers.

== Performances ==
According to different sources, the play's world premier was in the Figurteatret in Stamsund, Norway, on December 7, 2012 or March 7, 2013 at the Baruch Performing Arts Center in New York City. It toured Norway in autumn 2013 and spring 2014 and was also performed at the National Theatre of Iceland on 5–6 June 2014.

== Awards ==
In 2013 the play won a Drama Desk Special Award.
