= Bulbul Chakraborty =

Indian physicist and academic

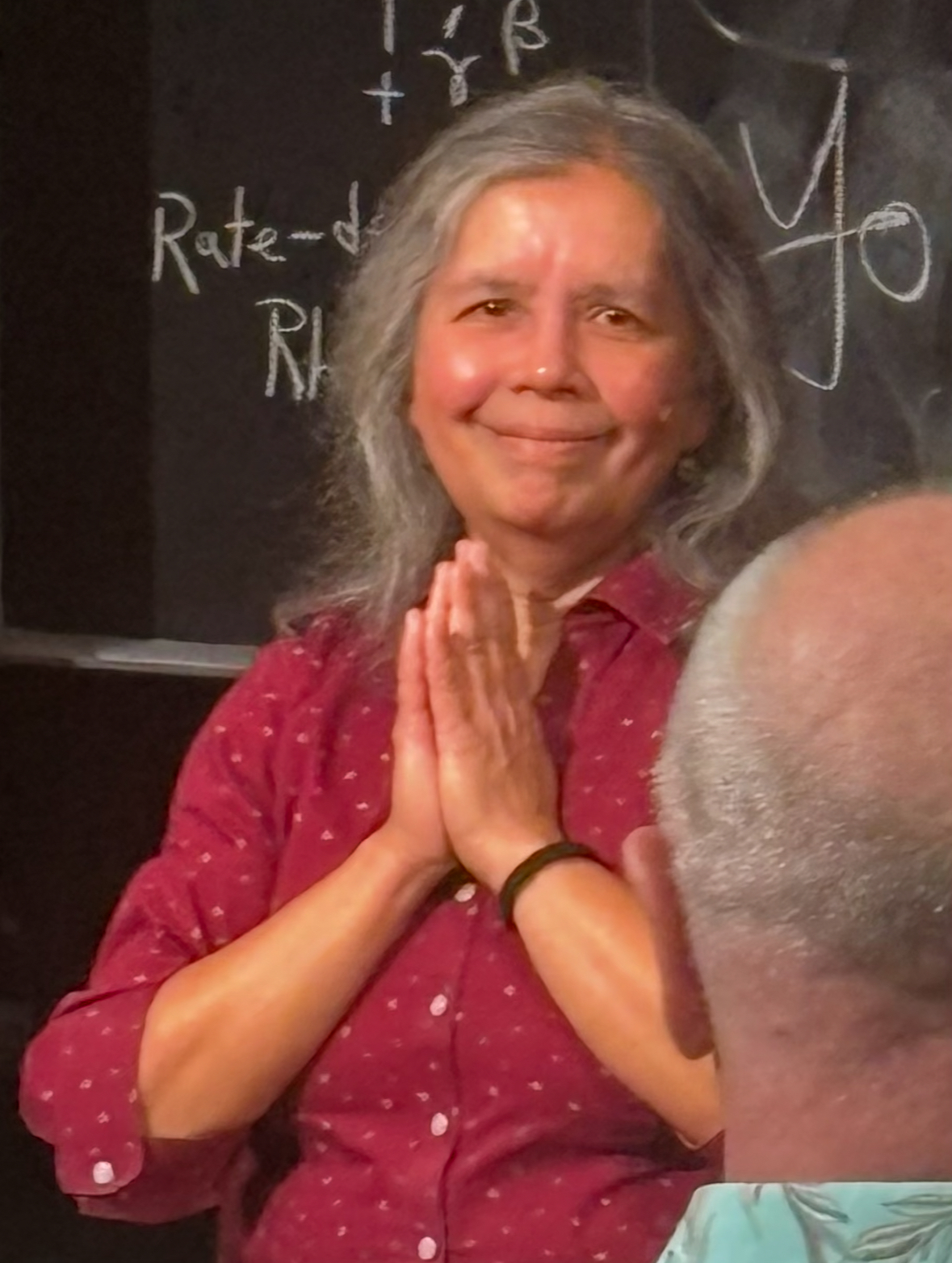
- Chakraborty in 2026
- Born: January 21, 1954 (age 72); India
- Education: Indian Institute of Technology; State University of New York
- Awards: Fellow of the American Association for the Advancement of Science (2020); Simons Fellow in Theoretical Physics (2018); Fellow of the American Physical Society (2008)
- Scientific career
- Fields: Condensed matter physics Soft matter
- Workplaces: Brandeis University

Bulbul Chakraborty (born January 21, 1954) is an Indian physicist and academic who is the Enid and Nate Ancell Professor of Physics at Brandeis University. She is recognized for her contributions to soft condensed matter theory studying systems far from equilibrium, such as granular materials, amorphous systems, and statistical physics. She was elected as a Member of the American Academy of Arts and Sciences in 2026, as a fellow of the American Association for the Advancement of Science in 2019 and a fellow of the American Physical Society in 2009.

== Academic career ==
Chakraborty graduated with a BSc in physics from the Indian Institute of Technology in 1974 and earned a PhD in 1979 from State University of New York, Stony Brook. The title of her PhD thesis is "Influence of thermal disorder on electronic properties of solids". She was a postdoctoral fellow at Argonne National Laboratory, Nordic Institute for Theoretical Physics (NORDITA) in Denmark, and a research associate at the Indian Institute of Science. She was a Scientific Officer (equivalent of assistant professor) at the Materials Science Laboratory, Indira Gandhi Center for Atomic Research (1984–1986), and an Associate Research Physicist and Lecturer, in Applied Physics, at Yale University (1987–1989). Chakraborty joined the faculty in the Physics Department at Brandeis University in 1989, where she has been Full Professor since 2000.

== Research contributions ==
Chakraborty has made significant contributions to the understanding of the jamming transition in amorphous materials. Her group uses statistical frameworks to investigate the properties of shear-jammed and densely packed particulate materials, finding that elasticity and friction are correlated with athermal fluctuations in many disordered systems.

According to Google Scholar, her publications have received over 6,000 citations and her h-index is 39.

== Awards and honors ==
Chakraborty is the Enid and Nate Ancell Professor of Physics at Brandeis University. She was elected fellow of the American Physical Society (APS) in 2008 "for important theoretical contributions to diverse areas of condensed matter physics, including frustrated magnets, diffusion of light particles in metals, the glass transition, and jamming in granular systems". In 2018, the Simons Foundation awarded Chakraborty a Simons Fellowship in Theoretical Physics. Chakraborty was elected Fellow of the American Association for the Advancement of Science (AAAS) in 2020.

Chakraborty received a 2025 Obie Award for her performance in the play Rheology, written by her son Shayok Misha Chowdhury.

== Selected publications ==
- Bi, Dapeng; Zhang, Jie; Chakraborty, Bulbul; Behringer, R. P. (14 December 2011). "Jamming by shear". Nature. 480 (7377): 355–358. doi:10.1038/nature10667. PMID 22170683. S2CID 4356160.
- Thomas, Jetin; Ramola, Kabir; Singh, Abhinedra; Mari, Romain; Morris, Jeffrey; Chakraborty, Bulbul (21 September 2018). "Microscopic Origin of Frictional Rheology in Dense Suspensions: Correlations in Force Space". Physical Review Letters. 121, 128002. doi:10.1103/PhysRevLett.121.128002.
- Behringer, Robert; Chakraborty, Bulbul (7 November 2018). "The physics of jamming for granular materials: a review". Reports on Progress in Physics. 82, 012601. doi:/10.1088/1361-6633/aadc3c.
- Bi, Dapeng; Henkes, Silke; Daniels, Karen E.; Chakraborty, Bulbul (March 2015). "The Statistical Physics of Athermal Materials". Annual Review of Condensed Matter Physics. 6 (1): 63–83. arXiv:1404.1854. doi:10.1146/annurev-conmatphys-031214-014336. S2CID 19307835.
- Henkes, Silke; O'Hern, Corey S.; Chakraborty, Bulbul (20 July 2007). "Entropy and Temperature of a Static Granular Assembly: An Ab Initio Approach". Physical Review Letters. 99 (3) 038002. arXiv:cond-mat/0701489. doi:10.1103/PhysRevLett.99.038002. PMID 17678329. S2CID 14348920.
