= The TEAM =

Experimental theater troupe founded in 2004

The TEAM is an experimental theater group founded in 2004. The group was originally formed as Theater of the Emerging American Moment by 12 graduates of New York University performing at the Edinburgh Festival Fringe. The TEAM has won four Fringe First awards and developed the plays Reconstructing, Primer for a Failed Superpower, and RoosevElvis.

== History ==
The TEAM was founded in 2004 by a group of 12 alumni of New York University students who sought to build on their studies in experimental theater. They crowdsourced funding to attend the Edinburgh Festival Fringe, where they presented Give Up and Start Over and A Thousand Natural Shocks. The performance resulted in a collaboration with the Traverse Theatre to develop the play Particularly in the Heartland for the Festival Fringe in 2006. For its early performances, the group went by Theater of the Emerging American Moment. By the premiere of RoosevElvis in 2013, it had rebranded as just "The TEAM". Critic Helen Shaw welcomed the change, calling the original name a "silly old thing" that reflected the group's tendency for "self-important pronouncements on America". Over its presentations at the Fringe, the ensemble received four Edinburgh Fringe First Awards. As of 2015, Rachel Chavkin served as artistic director, with core membership consisting of:

- Jessica Almasy
- Frank Boyd
- Rachel Chavkin
- Stephanie Douglass
- Jill Frutkin
- Brian Hastert
- Jake Heinrichs
- Matt Hubbs
- Libby King
- Ian Lassiter
- Jake Margolin
- Dave Polato
- Kristen Sieh
- Nick Vaughan

In 2008, the organization earned status as a 501(c)3 non-profit. The TEAM has sought and received governmental support, including from the National Endowment for the Arts. It also hosts fundraising benefits which have featured performances from Taylor Mac, Mandy Patinkin, Denée Benton, and Amber Gray.

The ensemble's work deals with themes of American culture and contemporary issues. The play Architecting positioned a narrative about rebuilding New Orleans after Hurricane Katrina in conversation with Gone with the Wind. RoosevElvis explored masculinity and hero worship in the characters of Theodore Roosevelt and Elvis Presley through the eyes of a lonely lesbian meat-packing worker in South Dakota. The TEAM also draws influence from film, frequently implementing audio-visual techniques in their theatrical work.

== Work ==
Year	Play	Premiere Venue	Notes	Ref.
2005	Give Up and Start Over	Edinburgh Festival Fringe		
2005	A Thousand Natural Shocks	Edinburgh Festival Fringe		
2006	Particularly in the Heartland	Edinburgh Festival Fringe	Co-produced with Traverse Theatre. Re-staged in 2007 for Performance Space 122	
2008	Architecting	Edinburgh Festival Fringe	Co-produced with the National Theater of Scotland	
2011	Mission Drift	Edinburgh Festival Fringe	Re-staged in 2012 for Performance Space 122's COIL Festival	
2013	RoosevElvis	The Bushwick Starr		
2016	The Holler Sessions	Performance Space 122		
2016	Anything that Gives Off Light	Edinburgh International Conference Centre	Co-produced with the National Theater of Scotland	
2017	Primer for a Failed Superpower	Roulette Intermedium		
