= Prince Faggot =

2025 Off-Broadway play

- Program cover from Studio Seaview run
- Original language: English
- Written by: Jordan Tannahill

Premiere
- Date: June 16, 2025
- Directed by: Shayok Misha Chowdhury

Prince Faggot is a 2025 play by Jordan Tannahill. Directed by Shayok Misha Chowdhury it premiered Off-Broadway in June 2025.

== Synopsis ==
An ensemble of queer and trans performers imagine a future world where Prince George of Cambridge is a gay man. In the process, they interrogate the ways in which power and colonisation play upon their lives and sexualities.

The play features a series of fictional, direct-address monologues written by the playwright for the members of the ensemble, and a final monologue based on the real-life experiences of actress N'yomi Allure Stewart.

== Production history ==
=== World premiere (Off-Broadway) ===
Prince Faggot opened at Playwrights Horizons with a first preview on May 30, 2025, an official opening night on June 16, and a scheduled closing on July 6. After an extension, the first run closed on August 3, 2025. The show was co-produced by Soho Rep and Jeremy O. Harris, and directed by Shayok Misha Chowdhury.

=== Studio Seaview (Off-Broadway) ===
The show returned for a second Off-Broadway run at Studio Seaview for an initial run of September 11, 2025 to October 26, 2025. It was later extended through November 30, 2025. On November 3, 2025, a third and final extension through December 13, 2025 was announced.

== Critical reception ==
New York Times theatre critic Jesse Green gave Prince Faggot a Critics' Pick and wrote "If the playwright means to shock, mission accomplished. But here’s the real shocker: the play... is thrilling. Inflammatory, nose-thumbing, explicit to the point of pornography, wild and undisciplined." The play received positive reviews from various publications including The New Yorker, Attitude, and Cosmopolitan, which described the show as "a horny, thought-provoking play that's as academic as it is avant-garde." The play stirred a degree of controversy and prompted international press coverage over its depiction of Prince George of Cambridge as an adult gay man engaged in kink and chemsex.

The premiere production was included on a number of 'Best of 2025' lists, including in the Los Angeles Times Artforum and Vulture. The play became one of the most nominated of the 2025-26 Off-Broadway season, and won the Lucille Lortel Award for Outstanding Play.

== Casting and characters ==
	Playwrights Horizons	Studio Seaview
Performer 1	Mihir Kumar	
Performer 2	K. Todd Freeman	Tyrone Mitchell Henderson (September 11-26, 2025); K. Todd Freeman (from September 27)
Performer 3	Rachel Crowl	
Performer 4	N'yomi Allure Stewart	
Performer 5	David Greenspan	
Performer 6	John McCrea	

== Awards and nominations ==
Prince Faggot won the 2026 Governor General's Award for English-language drama, and was a finalist for the 2026 Lambda Literary Award for Drama.

=== Original Off-Broadway production ===
Year	Award	Category	Nominee	Result	Ref.
2026	Lucille Lortel Awards	Outstanding Play	Jordan Tannahill	Won	
2026	Lucille Lortel Awards	Outstanding Direction	Shayok Misha Chowdhury	Nominated	
2026	Lucille Lortel Awards	Outstanding Featured Performer in a Play	David Greenspan	Nominated	
2026	Lucille Lortel Awards	Outstanding Lighting Design	Isabella Byrd	Nominated	
2026	Lucille Lortel Awards	Outstanding Costume Design	Montana Levi Blanco	Nominated	
2026	Lucille Lortel Awards	Outstanding Scenic Design	David Zinn	Nominated	
2026	Drama Desk Awards	Outstanding Play	Jordan Tannahill	Nominated	
2026	Drama Desk Awards	Outstanding Featured Performance in a Play	David Greenspan	Nominated	
2026	Drama Desk Awards	Outstanding Lighting Design	Isabella Byrd	Nominated	
2026	Drama League Awards	Outstanding Production of a Play		Nominated	
2026	Drama League Awards	Outstanding Direction of a Play	Shayok Misha Chowdhury	Nominated	
2026	Drama League Awards	Distinguished Performance	John McCrea	Nominated	
2026	Outer Critics Circle Awards	Outstanding New Off-Broadway Play	Jordan Tannahill	Nominated	
2026	Obie Award	Special Citation	Ensemble	Won	
2026	Dorian Award	Outstanding Off-Broadway Play		Won	
2026	Dorian Award	Outstanding LGBTQ Off-Broadway Production		Won	
2026	Dorian Award	Outstanding Lead Performance in an Off-Broadway Production	John McCrea	Won	
2026	Dorian Award	Outstanding Featured Performance in an Off-Broadway Production	K. Todd Freeman	Nominated	
2026	Dorian Award	Outstanding Featured Performance in an Off-Broadway Production	David Greenspan	Won	
2026	Dorian Award	Outstanding Writing for an Off-Broadway Production	Jordan Tannahill	Won	
2026	Dorian Award	Outstanding Design for an Off-Broadway Production		Nominated	
