= Julia May Jonas =

American playwright and novelist

Julia May Jonas is an American playwright and novelist. She published her debut novel Vladimir, which she helped adapt into the Netflix series of the same name. Jonas has also presented multiple plays in off-Broadway and off-off-Broadway theater, including A Woman Among Women.

== Early life and education ==
Jonas grew up in New Jersey. She briefly attended a school for troubled girls when she was 17. Jonas originally studied acting at New York University, originally to study acting, before shifting to playwriting. She later received an MFA in playwriting from Columbia University in 2012.

== Career ==
Jonas founded the theater company Nellie Tinder in 2003. Jonas's works with the ensemble include For Artists Only in 2009, Evelyn in 2012, and Emily Climbs (Machine Méchant) in 2015.

=== All Long True American Stories ===
In 2015, Jonas began to develop a five-play cycle of works that reimagined works of 20th century male American playwrights. She described the goal as to "take these male experience plays and write them for the female experience." As of 2026, two—A Woman Among Women and Problems Between Sisters—have been produced at professional theaters, with a third—We Used to Wear Bonnets & Get High All The Time—having been produced at Skidmore College. The cycle forms its name from the five plays from which it drew inspiration.

All Long True American Stories
Title	Basis	Premiere venue	Premiere year	Ref.
A Woman Among Women	All My Sons	The Bushwick Starr	2024	
We Used To Wear Bonnets & Get High All The Time	Long Day's Journey Into Night	Skidmore College	2018	
Problems Between Sisters	True West	Studio Theatre	2024	
in which Kim Sparrow is Prey to Unfortunate Circumstances	American Buffalo	Not yet premiered		
Untitled Zoo Story Project (Autosaved)	The Zoo Story	Not yet premiered		

=== Vladimir ===
Jonas started writing the novel Vladimir during the COVID-19 pandemic after considering the concept since 2018. The MeToo movement provided a major inspiration for the book. Jonas also considered the role that sexism played in how society consider older women's desires. Specifically, Jonas said:

I wanted to write about a wife who had been brought down by offenses she had been aware of, but had not committed, and I also wanted to write about a 58-year-old woman who still feels desire even though society, especially in our country, believes an older woman’s desire is supposed to be fading.

The novel was published on February 1, 2022. It received generally positive reviews and commercial success. In 2024, Sharon Horgan's Merman production company optioned the book. The book would be adapted into a limited series by Netflix, starring Rachel Weisz as the protagonist, John Slattery as her husband, and Leo Woodall as Vladimir. Jonas was credited as series creator and showrunner.

== Personal life ==
Jonas is married to the writer Adam Sternbergh, who is an editor at The New York Times Magazine. They have two children. In 2022, Jonas frequently used the social media site Twitter until her novel Vladimir was published in 2022.
