= N'yomi Stewart =

American stage actress and director

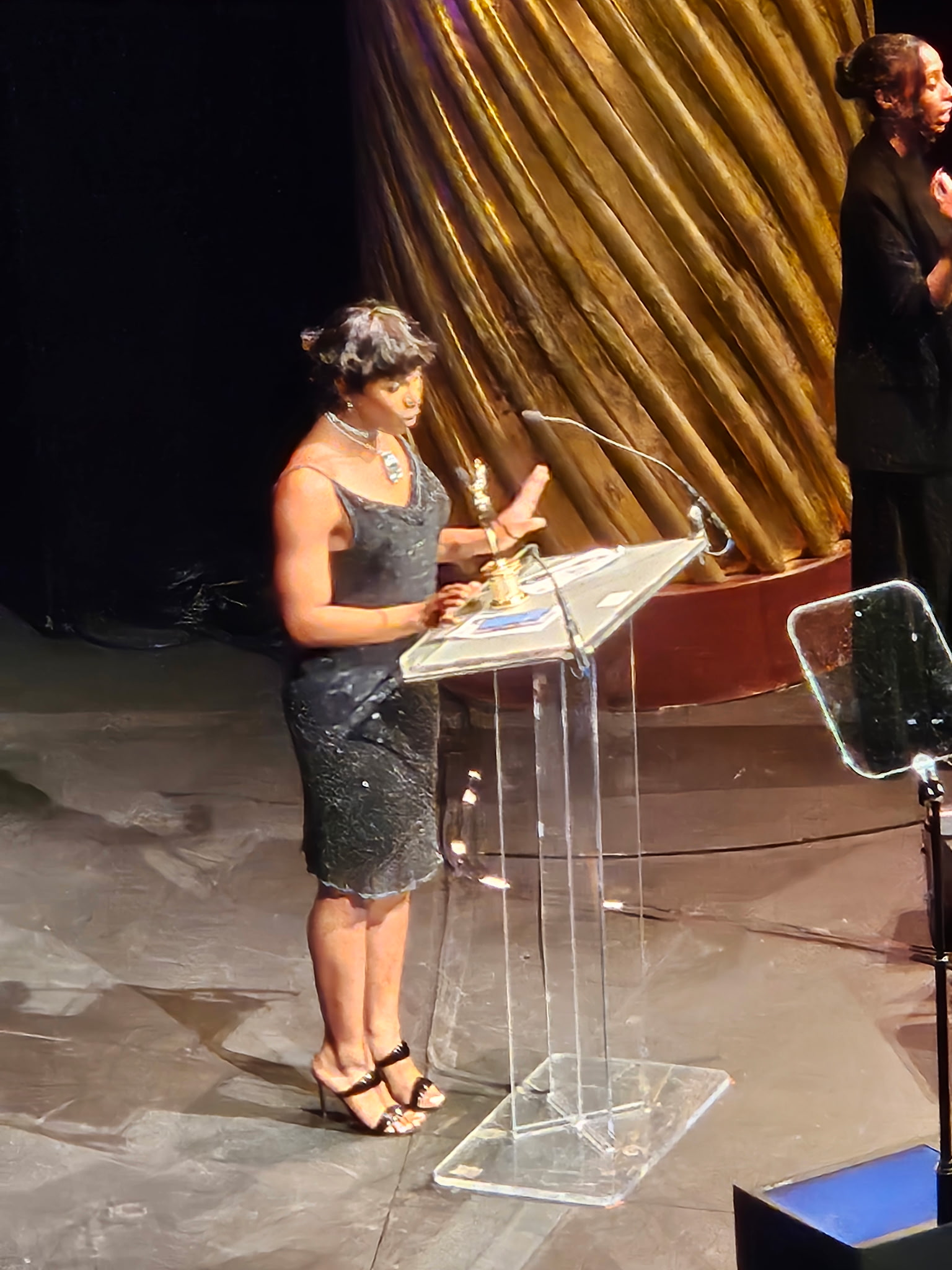
N'yomi Allure Stewart accepting the Outstanding Play award for Prince Faggot at 2026 Lucille Lortel Awards

N'yomi Allure Stewart is an American actress, writer, dancer, and multidisciplinary artist.

== Early life and education ==
Stewart was born in Greenville, South Carolina. She was the first Black transgender woman to graduate with a B.F.A from the University of North Carolina School of the Arts Acting Program.

== Career ==
Stewart was assistant director for the off-Broadway production of Cats: The Jellicle Ball, where she made her off-Broadway directorial debut as Directing Fellow through the Black Theatre Coalition. She was Artist in Residence at the New York Theater Workshop and was a 2023 GALLIM Moving Artist Resident.

Stewart was cast in the original off-Broadway production of A Raisin in the Sun at the Public Theater, directed by Robert O'Hara.

In 2025, Stewart originated the role of Performer 4 in the critically acclaimed off-Broadway play Prince Faggot. She was involved in the first 2022 workshop of the play, where she developed a fourth-wall-breaking autobiographical monologue that now closes out the show. The monologue is about her personal relationship with the institution of royalty and New York City's ballroom scene, of which she is an active member.
