= A Woman Among Women =

2024 play by Julia May Jonas

- Written by: Julia May Jonas
- Based on: All My Sons
- Setting: contemporary Northampton, Massachusetts

Premiere
- Place: The Bushwick Starr
- Directed by: Sarah Cameron Hughes

A Woman Among Women is a play by Julia May Jonas that premiered at The Bushwick Starr in October 2024. The play is the first in the All Long True American Stories cycle re-imagining the American theatrical canon, with A Woman reimagining Arthur Miller's All My Sons. The plot follows the Northampton, Massachusetts founder of a women's health center and local leader, whose community begins to turn on itself. Following its run at the Starr, the play was remounted by Lincoln Center Theater in June 2026.

== Plot overview ==
The narrative follows the lead character of Cleo, who is a well-respected founder of a women's health center in Northampton, Massachusetts. Cleo has two adult daughters—Grace and Jo—and lives with a platonic partner named Tina, who helped raise both children after the death of Cleo's abusive, alcoholic husband. During the events of the play, Jo is in prison after having beat a man to death, partly due to her bipolar disorder and intermittent explosive disorder. Tina, Grace and Sarah, a neighbor, believe that there must have been something off for her to behave that way given her medicated stability. Jo's husband Roy express interest only in moving on and raising the couple's young daughter. In his recent arrival to the town, Roy draws the romantic but indecisive interest of Grace. Cleo also wants to move forward from Jo's conviction after managing her wayward daughter's mental health for so long.

In the final scenes, Tina realizes that Cleo had interfered with Jo's prescribed dosage of lithium just before the incident. Cleo believed that the lithium would disrupt Cleo's unborn grandchild.

== Development ==
The play takes its name from a line in All My Sons, describing the protagonist as "a man among men". Jonas sought to shift the story of All My Sons from that of factory manager during World War II to a contemporary setting where a woman would be a pillar of the community. The play's director Sarah Cameron Hughes worked with Jonas to develop the play.

A Woman Among Women premiered at The Bushwick Starr in October 2024, as a co-production between the Starr and New Georges. In June 2026, the play was re-staged at Lincoln Center Theater's off-Broadway Clara Tow Theater.

== Reception ==
The Bushwick Starr version was named a New York Times Critic's Pick, with chief critic Jesse Green writing that "it sees opposing things at once, uplifting and criticizing its characters, respecting and rethinking its source." Green did fault the play's denouement, where "the desired exclamation point ([Arthur] Miller was very good at those) sags into a question mark." Sara Holdren praised the story as engaging, applauding how the play's drama doesn't rely on patriarchy, but depends on the characters in the play itself. For The New Yorker, Helen Shaw noted that the play followed Jonas's work examining "our cultural patrimony through a feminist lens—one so tightly focused that it burns."

In a review of the Lincoln Center Theater remount, a Theatermania reviewer wrote that the play had too much exposition and ambiguity, resulting in a production that "frustrates more than excites." In a 2/5 star review for New York Stage Review, Roma Torre noted that it "comes up short", especially in the ultimate anagnorisis "which feels entirely undeserved." For DC Theater Arts, critic Deb MIller called the play a "mixed bag".
