= Montana Levi Blanco =

American costume designer

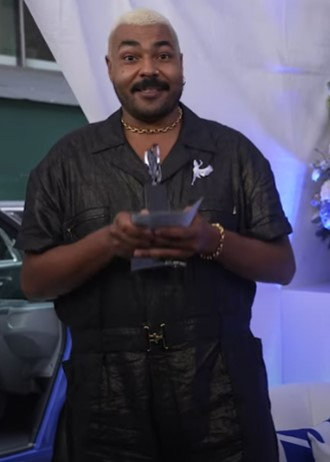
- Blanco at the 75th Tony Awards, 2022
- Born: April 25, 1984 (age 42); Albuquerque, New Mexico, U.S.
- Education: Oberlin College (BA, BM); Brown University (MA); Yale University (MFA)
- Occupation: Costume designer
- Website: montanaleviblanco.com

Montana Levi Blanco (born April 25, 1984) is an American costume designer. He won a Tony Award in the category Best Costume Design in a Play for the play The Skin of Our Teeth.

== Early life and education ==
Blanco grew up in Albuquerque New Mexico. While pursuing a dual degree in oboe and history at Oberlin College’s conservatory program, he did "a thesis on sartorial communication, about how people of color use their body as adornment and capital and power.”

Blanco then attended Brown University to study public humanities and in his final semester took an introduction to set design class. After a curatorial fellowship in the Tobin Collection of Theater Arts at the McNay Art Museum, Blanco pursued an MFA in design at the Yale School of Drama.

== Stage credits ==
Year	Title	Role	Venue	Ref.
2017	Ghost Light	Costume Designer	Off-Broadway, Claire Tow Theatre	
2018	Fairview	Costume Designer	Off-Broadway, Soho Rep	
2018	The House That Will Not Stand	Costume Designer	Off-Broadway, New York Theatre Workshop	
2018	He Brought Her Heart Back in a Box	Costume Designer	Off-Broadway, Theatre for a New Audience	
2018	Fabulation, or The Re-Education of Undine	Costume Designer	Off-Broadway, Pershing Square Signature Center	
2019	A Strange Loop	Costume Designer	Off-Broadway, Playwrights Horizons	
2019	Fefu and Her Friends	Costume Designer	Off-Broadway, Theatre for a New Audience	
2020	Daddy	Costume Designer	West End, Almeida Theatre	
2022	The Skin of Our Teeth	Costume Designer	Broadway, Vivian Beaumont Theatre	
2022	A Strange Loop	Costume Designer	Broadway, Lyceum Theatre	
2022	Epiphany	Costume Designer	Off-Broadway, Mitzi E. Newhouse Theatre	
2023	A Strange Loop	Costume Designer	West End, Barbican Centre	
2024	Six Characters	Costume Designer	Off-Broadway, Claire Tow Theatre	
2024	The Blood Quilt	Costume Designer	Off-Broadway, Mitzi E. Newhouse Theatre	
2025	Prince Faggot	Costume Designer	Off-Broadway, Playwrights Horizons	
2025	Prince Faggot	Costume Designer	Off-Broadway, Studio Seaview	

== Awards and nominations ==
Year	Award	Category	Work	Result	Ref.
2018	Obie Award	Distinguished Design	He Brought Her Heart Back in a Box	Won	
2019	Drama Desk Award	Sam Norkin Award		Won	
2020	Obie Award	Special Citation	A Strange Loop	Won	
2020	Drama Desk Award	Outstanding Costume Design of a Play	Fefu and Her Friends	Nominated	
2022	Tony Award	Best Costume Design of a Play	The Skin of Our Teeth	Won	
2026	Lucille Lortel Award	Outstanding Costume Design	Prince Faggot	Nominated	
