= The Death of Little Ibsen =

Puppet play about the life of Henrik Ibsen

The Death Of Little Ibsen is a puppet play about the life of Henrik Ibsen performed in May 2006 at the Sanford Meisner Theater in New York City. It was created by Wakka Wakka Productions. The puppets were created by Kirjan Waage, a co-founder and member of Wakka Wakka. The Death of Little Ibsen began its fall 2006 tour at the 2006 Ibsen Festival at The National Theater in Oslo, Norway, and was performed on 2 and 3 February 2007 as the first event in Bowdoin College's Ibsenfest.
