= Wakka Wakka Productions =

Wakka Wakka Productions is a non-profit New York theatre company founded in 2001. In 2011 the company won an Obie Award and in 2013 a Drama Desk Special Award. Productions have included The Death of Little Ibsen and SAGA.
