= Shayok Misha Chowdhury =

American playwright and stage director (born 1984)

- Chowdhury in 2025
- Born: December 23, 1984 (age 41); India
- Education: Stanford University (BA) Columbia University (MFA)
- Occupations: Playwright; stage director
- Relatives: Bulbul Chakraborty (mother)
- Writing career
- Notable work: Public Obscenities
- Website: shayokmishachowdhury.com

Shayok Misha Chowdhury (born December 23, 1984) is an American playwright and theater director. He wrote the plays Public Obscenities and Rheology. For Public Obscenities, Chowdhury was a finalist for the 2024 Pulitzer Prize for Drama. Chowdhury has also directed productions of Aleshea Harris's Brother Brother, Jordan Tannahill's Prince Faggot, Jesse Eisenberg's The Ziegfield Files, an outdoor revival of The Gospel at Colonus, and his own plays.

== Early life and education ==
Chowdhury was born in India, on December 23, 1984. He grew up in Massachusetts. His parents, Bulbul Chakraborty and Partha Chowdhury, are both physicists who emigrated to the US when he was a child. A native Bangla-speaker, he grew up listening to the plays and songs of the Bengali polymath Rabindranath Tagore, which became a major influence.

Chowdhury received a bachelor's degree from Stanford University. He later received an MFA in theater from Columbia University, graduating in 2016.

== Career ==
In 2020, Chowdhury and partner Kameron Neal's MukhAgni, a "performance memoir", was part of the 2020 Under the Radar Festival. Later that year, the fourth part of Chowdhury's project Vichitra was presented at the Bushwick Starr. He also has worked with Laura Grill Jaye to form the songwriting duo "Grill and Chowder". Grill Jaye and Chowdhury received the Relentless Award from the American Playwriting Foundation in 2022 for their unproduced musical How the White Girl Got Her Spots and Other '80 s Trivia.

=== Public Obscenities ===
Chowdhury wrote and directed Public Obscenities, which premiered at the Soho Repertory Theatre in February 2023. Co-produced by Soho Rep and the National Asian American Theater Company, the play follows Choton, a Bengali-American PhD candidate returning to Kolkata, India with his black American cinematographer boyfriend Raheem to study the region's queer subculture. The narrative follows Choton and Raheem and Choton's relatives, who they stay with in Kolkata. Chowdhury has identified the work as semi-autobiographical, matching his own history as an academically oriented Bengali-American, who often traveled with his black film-maker partner. The plot was also partially inspired both by a story his uncle told him and by Chowdhury's reflections on the young life of his deceased grandfather.

The play is bilingual, with dialogue in both Bangla and English, featuring supertitles. Chowdhury described the style as akin to "theater vérité" wherein "the aesthetic leans into documentary precision and mimics the rhythms of real life." It was a New York Times critic pick. In the The New Yorker, Helen Shaw characterized Chowdhury's writing and direction as "both gorgeously precise." Public Obscenities was named a finalist for the Pulitzer Prize for Drama.

=== Rheology ===
In 2025, Chowdhury wrote and directed Rheology in a co-production between The Bushwick Starr, HERE Arts Center, and Ma-Yi Theater Company. The play features both Chowdury and his mother, Bulbul Chakraborty, as the lead players, acting under their own names. In the narrative, the characters discuss and pre-enact Chakraborty's death, especially in the context of Chowdhury's work as a theater-maker and Chakraborty's work as a physicist focused on rheology. Chowdhury described the play as premised on their opportunity "to meet each other’s professional selves, which is a thing that my mom never got to do with her mom."

In a New York Times review, critic Juan A. Ramirez noted that it was occasionally "heady," but overall praised the work as a follow-up to Public Obscenities. In a version staged at REDCAT in Los Angeles, Charles McNulty praised the work generally as well as the "visual panache" of Chowdhury's direction.

=== Directing projects ===
In 2025, he directed Jordan Tannehill's play Prince Faggot, which was described a hit with positive reviews. Chowdhury's work was described as calibrated for "maximum theatricality" by Jesse Green. Shaw wrote that he directed with "explicit brio". In the same year, Chowdhury directed a revival of the musical The Gospel at Colonus on Little Island at Pier 55 and Jesse Eisenberg's one-man-show The Ziegfeld Files at Studio Seaview. In addition to his own work, he also directed a digital version of Aleshea Harris's Brother Brother in 2021.

== Work ==
=== As writer ===
Year	Title	Premiere venue	Notes	Ref.
2020	MukhAgni	Under the Radar Festival	Created and performed with Kameron Neal	
2023	Public Obscenities	Soho Repertory Theatre	Also director; finalist for 2024 Pulitzer Prize for Drama	
2025	Rheology	The Bushwick Starr	Also director, co-lead actor	

=== As director ===
Year	Title	Venue	Writer	Notes	Ref.
2021	Brother Brother	New York Theatre Workshop	Aleshea Harris	Digital stream	
2023	Public Obscenities	Soho Repertory Theatre	Shayok Misha Chowdhury		
2025	Rheology	The Bushwick Starr	Shayok Misha Chowdhury		
2025	Prince Faggot	Playwrights Horizon	Jordan Tannahill		
2025	The Gospel at Colonus	Little Island at Pier 55	Lee Breuer & Bob Telson	Revival	
2025	The Ziegfeld Files	Studio Seaview	Jesse Eisenberg		
