= RoosevElvis =

2013 play by The TEAM

- Written by: The TEAM (Rachel Chavkin, Libby King, Kristen Sieh, and Jake Margolin, with Matt Hubbs, Andrew Schneider, and Nick Vaughan)

Premiere
- Place: The Bushwick Starr
- Directed by: Rachel Chavkin

RoosevElvis is a play which premiered at The Bushwick Starr in 2013. The play was created by The TEAM theater troupe and directed by TEAM member Rachel Chavkin. It follows a meat-packing worker from South Dakota who imagines herself as Elvis Presley and imagines a prospective romantic partner—a taxidermist from North Dakota—as Theodore Roosevelt. The play explores themes of masculinity, dating, and loneliness, as well as the lives of the two men. After its run at the Starr, it was also produced at the American Repertory Theater in Massachusetts and the Royal Court Theatre in London.

== Plot ==
The play begins with two women on stage in drag as Elvis Presley (Ann) and Teddy Roosevelt (Brenda) discussing their life stories. The conversation shifts as Elvis tells Teddy that he's developing feelings for him, which Teddy questions, given they've only known each other for three days. The play resets days earlier, directly after Ann and Brenda's first date. The two met in person after talking online, with Brenda visiting Ann's Rapid City from her home in North Dakota for a taxidermy conference. As Brenda showers, Ann resumes a dialogue with Elvis (who is played by Ann's actor), with Elvis encouraging her to continue to expand her comfort zone. When Brenda returns, they agree to visit Badlands National Park—Brenda's suggestion—and Mount Rushmore—Ann's suggestion.

As they travel in a rented RV to the two sites, as well as Wall Drug, they grow distant from each other. Ann questions Brenda's relationship with her ex-husband, while Brenda is dismayed by Ann's disinterest in adventure, especially her shame in being gay, her never having flown on a plane, and having worked at the meat-packing plant for 15 years. They part tersely and Ann returns to the routine of her life. Elvis reappears, presenting Ann with a pair of blue suede shoes and a brief hallucinatory dance between Ann in full Elvis regalia and the actor who plays Brenda dressed as Ann-Margret. After an extended monologue, Elvis recedes back into Ann, who decides to follow her dream of traveling to Graceland. After she fails to arrange a flight via Spirit Airlines, Ann is discouraged. Teddy appears and pushing her to continue her plan as a road trip.

Elvis and Teddy lead the trip to Graceland. They discuss their lives, with each comparing Elvis's karate and Teddy's boxing, recounting various fights or feats, and discussing the deaths of their respective loved ones. At Elvis's prompting, Teddy surfaces John Muir as his own guiding spirit who encourages Teddy's wanderlust. After Elvis goes to sleep at the group's makeshift campsite, Teddy also speaks with the spirit of his wife Alice, proudly admiring the pristine environment before lamenting his loneliness. Ann rejoins the narrative in the morning, monologuing about a dream she had where she went to work in her underwear and flouted multiple social norms.

The car breaks down and Ann reproaches herself for her failings. Elvis and Teddy start arguing with each other. After Teddy makes fun of karate, Elvis remarks that Teddy would be unpleasant as a parent. In response, Teddy lambasts Elvis for his irresponsibility and "whore" behavior, while Elvis complains that Teddy is privileged and blinded by his own rigid worldview. The two begin to physically fight off-stage. After they exit, Ann calls Brenda and recounts her dream. She asks whether Brenda thinks there's something wrong with her and whether she remembers their weekend together fondly. Brenda replies that she pitied Ann as disconnected from the world and that she had only thought of her when laughing about their weekend together with friends. She also said that she was happy to hear Ann had pushed herself to get to Graceland.

Elvis and Teddy return after having reconciled and are happy to find that Ann set out for Graceland. On video, Elvis and Teddy re-enact the ending of Thelma & Louise. When the car goes over the cliff, the video cuts to Ann at Graceland, which is closed for the day. She signs her name on the wall.

== Development ==
The play was created by the TEAM ensemble, with the writing credited to Rachel Chavkin, Libby King, Kristen Sieh, and Jake Margolin, with Matt Hubbs, Andrew Schneider, and Nick Vaughan. The idea for the show originally came Sieh's interest in Roosevelt after reading Edmund Morris's biographical trilogy during the TEAM's earlier play Architecting. The character of Roosevelt was left out of that play, but King and Chavkin both separately grew interested in Elvis Presley and sought to incorporate him into a play. Margolin introduced Thelma & Louise as an inspiration, with the concept becoming based around a road trip between Roosevelt and Presley. The Morris series and Peter Guralnick's two-part biography of Presley formed the basis for the depictions of the two historical figures. Chavkin described the dynamic the TEAM imagined between the men:

Teddy is this Victorian, progressive patrician. He believed in putting things in boxes, that you were either a moral person or an amoral person. Whereas Elvis was blending black and white and male and female at a time when the country was going through this a sexual revolution and a civil rights movement [. ..] We think Teddy would have hated Elvis if they’d lived at the same time and yet Elvis had a quote of Teddy’s on his wall—Teddy was Elvis’ hero. That’s at the heart of the play: who gets to be a hero?

The Presley and Roosevelt performances are based on drag. Sieh drew from reports of Roosevelt's voice as "shrill, loud, grandmotherly, effete" and used an impression of Katharine Hepburn to communicate his upper-class status. King focused on Elvis impersonators and Presley's androgyny. The play is intentionally ambiguous as the two actors shift between Roosevelt, Presley, Brenda, Ann, and the other characters.

The TEAM, which is a non-profit, received a $10,000 grant in 2014 from the National Endowment for the Arts, as well as $24,500 in other government funding. Senator Tom Coburn (R-OK) included the play in his annual catalog of suspect government funding. Senator Jeff Flake (R-AZ) also criticized the funding, saying "what in San Juan Hill is the federal government doing funding this hunk-a-hunk-a burnin' waste". Chavkin said the funding was used to revive the production for Performance Space 122's COIL Festival.

=== Productions ===
The play premiered at The Bushwick Starr in October 2013, directed by Chavkin. In January 2015, RoosevElvis ran as part of Performance Space 122's annual COIL Festival. Chavkin and The TEAM remounted the show at the Royal Court Theatre in London in November 2015, as well as the American Repertory Theater in Cambridge, Massachusetts in May 2016.

Character	The Bushwick Starr October 2013	Royal Court, London November 2015	American Repertory Theater May 2016
Ann/Elvis Presley	Libby King	Libby King	Libby King
Brenda/Teddy Roosevelt (also John Muir and Alice Roosevelt)	Kristen Sieh	Kristen Sieh	Kristen Sieh

== Reception ==
In The New York Times, chief critic Ben Brantley gave the play a qualified review, writing that it was over-long, but that both performances succeed and that the play "offers a spirited and insightful commentary on two archetypes of American masculinity, while finding teasing ambiguities within both that suggest that machismo is a shaky existential choice." A review for The Village Voice praised the play, noting that it was "rare for a show so sad to be so funny—so alive." Noting its "sagginess" toward the end, Helen Shaw wrote that it featured "gorgeous, buoyant" moments at its best.

For the London Observer, Susannah Clapp wrote that while it looked as "as laboriously larky as a student skit[, it] ends by touching softer, more troubling notes." In a review of the ART version, a Boston Globe critic praised the performances of the two leads and the direction. For The Arts Fuse, Bill Marx critiqued the play as "a smattering of good ideas, spurts of self-indulgence, flickers of promise with too few solid rewards. RoosevElvis is amusing, but in terms of artistic discipline it could use more whacks from a big stick."
