= The Bushwick Starr =

Non-profit theater in Brooklyn, New York

Coordinates: 40°41′43.8″N 73°54′17.3″W

- Interactive map of The Bushwick Starr
- Address: 419 Eldert Street; Brooklyn, New York City; United States
- Designation: Off-off Broadway
- Public transit: New York City Subway: Halsey Street station

The Bushwick Starr is an off-off-Broadway non-profit theater in the Bushwick neighborhood of Brooklyn, New York City. It was cofounded in 2007 by Sue Kessler and Noel Allain, who also serve as its directors. The Starr was located on Starr Street until 2020 when their space was sold and they announced the purchase of and relocation to a former dairy plant at 419 Eldert Street.

The Starr is known for its artists, including Jeremy O. Harris, Daniel Fish, Dave Malloy, and Heather Christian. They first programmed a full season in 2009 and were firmly a part of the Off Off Broadway community by 2011. The venue especially features experimental theatre works and seeks to avoid the commercial pressures of other larger theaters.

== History ==
The Starr was founded by Sue Kessler and Noel Allain, serving as executive director and artistic director. The theater was created as an off-off-Broadway outlet in the pre-gentrified neighborhood of Bushwick. In 2001, Kessler and Josh Chambers converted a second-floor loft space at 207 Starr Street into a black box theater with Fovea Floods, a theater ensemble they founded with Allain and Technical Director Jay Maury at Skidmore College. When Fovea Floods disbanded in the early 2000s, Allain, Kessler, and Maury kept the theater and rented it out to various artists or groups in need of a performance space; they took over the theater's programming in 2007 after multiple productions they felt were "not good". Allain also described renting the venue to the play The Penitent Hours by Julia May Jonas as fueling their desire to develop similar works themselves. The Brooklyn Rail noted the Starr's opening as part of a trend of arts spaces appearing in Bushwick. The Starr curated its first full season in 2009.

In June 2020, the theater received notice that its building was to be converted into residential housing and that they would need to relocate. Kesller and Allain announced in 2021 that they had purchased a $2.2 million former dairy plant on the eastern end of Bushwick, at 419 Eldert Street. They planned to convert for opening the following year. They officially opened the space in 2024. During the renovation of the 419 Eldert property, the Starr partnered with other organizations—including The Public Theater and the ¡Oye! Group—to co-produce new works.

In addition to its theatrical work, the Starr has also hosted events for the local community. In February 2018, the "Because the Night" panel featured discussions of gentrification in the wake of the creation of a city-wide Office of Nightlife. In October 2024, New York State Assembly Member Robert Carroll and Senator Julia Salazar used the theater to announce their proposal of a state law that would help incentivize small theater spaces in the city. Though it exists as a gentrifying force in the neighborhood, the Starr has intentionally sought to work within the community. It has run an afterschool eco-playwriting program called Big Green Theater for 16 years, partners with Caitlin Ryan O'Connell to run Senior Storytelling at various local senior centers, partnered with El Puente for its Creating Performance class, and hosts a Saturday morning theater games class for kids at the theater. It hosted the annual Taste of Bushwick food showcase from 2014 to 2018. The theater also hosts an annual gala to fundraise for its own programming. In 2025, the gala received the organization $300,00 in donations.

== Artistic style ==
In its early years, the venue was noted for its experimental theater projects, and described in the Wall Street Journal as "a terrific little house full of DIY charm." The Starr is known for transforming its performance space to fit the works on stage. Kessler said that the theater sought to prevent external pressures from critics or commercial performance from affecting the sharpness of the work on stage. In The New Yorker, Rollo Romig wrote that the Starr had "built a well-deserved reputation over the past decade for solid but adventurous programming".

== Notable premieres ==
Year	Creator	Work	Details	Ref
2010	Performance Lab 115	The Ring Cycle (Part 1 + 2)	Reimagining of The Ring Cycle	
2011	Tina Satter	In the Pony Palace/Football		
2012	The Debate Society	Blood Play		
2013	Joshua Conkel & Matt Marks	The House of Von Macramé		
2013	The TEAM	RoosevElvis		
2014	Dave Malloy	Ghost Quartet		
2015	Ariel Stess	Heartbreak		
2016	Clare Barron	I'll Never Love Again		
2016	The Mad Ones	Miles for Mary		
2017	Kristine Haruna Lee	Suicide Forest		
2017	Julia Benson	[Porto]		
2017	Heather Christian	Animal Wisdom		
2018	Darian Dauchan	The Brobot Johnson Experience		
2019	Jeremy O. Harris	Black Exhibition		
2020	Jillian Walker	Skinfolk		
2021	Hillary Miller	Preparedness		
2022	Agnes Borinsky	Song of Songs		
2022	One Whale's Tale	Quince		
2023	Keelay Gipson	Demons		
2024	Julia May Jonas	A Woman Among Women	Reimagining of All My Sons	
2025	Shayok Misha Chowdhury	Rheology		
2025	David Cale	Blue Cowboy		
