= Jordan Tannahill =

Canadian playwright, film and theatre director

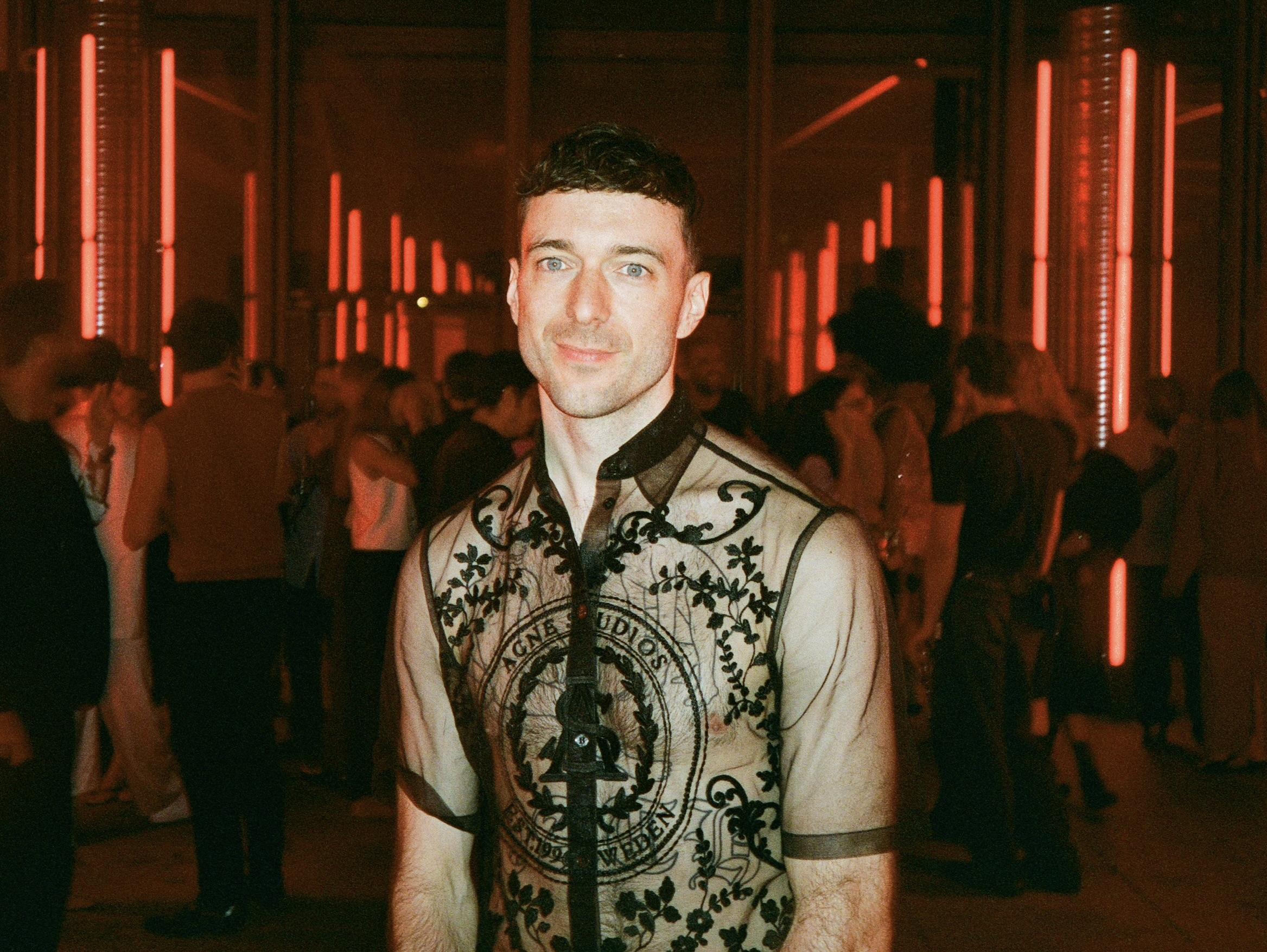
- Tannahill in 2023
- Born: May 19, 1988 (age 38); Ottawa, Ontario, Canada
- Occupations: Writer; director
- Spouse: Brandon Flynn (m. 2024)
- Writing career
- Genres: Drama; novels; non-fiction
- Website: jordantannahill.com

Jordan Tannahill (born May 19, 1988) is a Canadian writer and director. He is author of the play Prince Faggot, and the novels The Living Realm and The Listeners, the latter of which was shortlisted for the 2021 Giller Prize, and adapted into a limited series for the BBC. His novels and plays have been translated into twenty languages, and honoured with several prizes including three Governor General's Literary Awards.

Tannahill has been described as "the enfant terrible of Canadian Theatre" by Libération and The Walrus, and "one of Canada's leading writers" by Helen Shaw in The New Yorker. In 2019, CBC Arts named Tannahill as one of sixty-nine LGBTQ Canadians, living or deceased, who has shaped the country's history.

== Early life ==
Tannahill was born and raised in Ottawa, where he attended Canterbury High School. He moved to Toronto in 2006 to study film at Toronto Metropolitan University, and began making short films and staging experimental plays, often with non-traditional collaborators like night-shift workers, frat boys, preteens, and employees of Toronto's Honest Ed's discount emporium. In his early twenties, he made several photographic and video works with artist Nina Arsenault. Tannahill moved to London in 2016, where he became active in the city's kink scene.

== Videofag ==
In 2012, Tannahill and his then-boyfriend William Ellis converted a former barbershop in Toronto's Kensington Market into Videofag, a small, multi-arts space that functioned variously as a gallery, cinema, and performance venue. Over the four years of its existence, Videofag became a hub for queer counterculture in Toronto.

== Novels ==
=== Liminal ===
Tannahill's debut novel, Liminal, published in 2018, is a work of autofiction which follows the author as he reckons with the nature of consciousness and the abject, precipitated by the sight of his mother's sleeping - or possibly dead - body. In her review of the novel, Martha Schabas of The Globe and Mail wrote "Tannahill's lushly intelligent debut... captures something illuminating and undefinable about the present moment; it speaks in the code and cadences of the late 2010s and paints an incisive portrait of the demographic we call millennial". In Le Devoir, Anne-Frédérique Hébert-Dolbec called the novel "a prodigious odyssey that tests the limits of reason and materiality." Liminal won the 2021 Prix des Jeunes Libraires.

=== The Listeners ===
The Listeners, published in 2021, follows Claire Devon, a woman whose life and beliefs are irrevocably altered after she starts hearing The Hum. The book made the Canadian national bestsellers list, and was shortlisted for the 2021 Giller Prize. In their citation, the Giller jury called the novel "a masterful interrogation of the body, as well as the desperate violence that undergirds our lives in the era of social media, conspiracies, isolation and environmental degradation."

The Listeners began as a story written for a new opera by composer Missy Mazzoli and librettist Royce Vavrek, which premiered at the Norwegian National Opera in 2022, directed by Lileana Blain-Cruz. Zachary Woolfe in the New York Times named the production one of the Best Classical Performances of 2024, calling it "the unmissable opera of the season", while Alex Ross of The New Yorker called it "mesmerizing" and declared Mazzoli "a once-in-a-generation magician of the orchestra."

Tannahill adapted his novel into a limited series, produced by Element Pictures for the BBC, directed by Janicza Bravo and starring Rebecca Hall. The series premiered at the 2024 Toronto International Film Festival, and aired to critical acclaim on BBC on November 19, 2024.

=== The Living Realm ===
Tannahill's third novel, published in September 2026 by Farrar, Straus and Giroux, follows an unnamed British expat who, while cruising one evening by Teufelssee, encounters a stranger who he becomes convinced is his long-dead lover, Lukas. Christopher Bollen, in his review of the novel in The New York Times, described the novel as "astonishing" and wrote: "In this extraordinary and sensitive novel, Tannahill puts Leo Bersani's ideas to the test, proving there’s a lot of brain fodder in bodies groping in the dark." In a starred review, Publishers Weekly described the novel as "a perfectly rendered story of friendship, love, and the porous border between the living and the dead."

=== Other Writing ===
Tannahill is a regular contributor to Butt (magazine), and has both written and spoken openly about his experiences with escorting and kink.

Tannahill's book of essays on theatre, Theatre of the Unimpressed: In Search of Vital Drama, first published in 2015, was called "essential reading for anybody interested in the state of contemporary theatre and performance" by The Globe and Mail. In 2022, Playbill listed the book as one of fourteen essential books for theatre students.

== Theatre and performance ==
Tannahill's first collection of plays, Age of Minority: Three Solo Plays, was published in 2013 and received Canada's Governor General's Award for English-language drama.

His play Late Company, about two sets of parents seeking closure after a tragedy involving their sons, premiered in Toronto in 2014, and went on to receive multiple productions across Canada, and abroad, including on London's West End. The play's Polish translation has been running in repertory at Juliusz Słowacki Theatre in Kraków since 2021.

Concord Floral, a play written by Tannahill, and developed and directed by Erin Brubacher and Cara Spooner over a three-year process involving Toronto-area teenagers, is a reimagining of Giovanni Boccaccio's The Decameron as a contemporary suburban ghost story. The play premiered in 2014 at The Theatre Centre in Toronto, and has since been produced in translation at theatres including the Volkstheater, Vienna and the Deutsches Theater (Berlin). Concord Floral was a finalist for the 2016 Governor General's Award for English-language drama, and won a Dora Mavor Moore Award for 'Outstanding New Play'.

Tannahill premiered a double-bill of plays, Botticelli in the Fire & Sunday in Sodom in 2016 at Canadian Stage in Toronto. The first play, Botticelli in the Fire, is a queer reimagining of the events leading up to the bonfire of the vanities in 1497 Florence, while the second play, Sunday in Sodom, is a retelling of the destruction of Sodom and Gomorrah from the perspective of Lot's wife. The plays jointly won the 2018 Governor General's Award for English-language drama.

Tannahill's play Declarations, regarding his mother's terminal illness, premiered in 2018 at Canadian Stage in Toronto, was later presented at the 2021 Festival TransAmériques in Montreal. His play for an ensemble of young people, Is My Microphone On?, was commissioned by Düsseldorfer Schauspielhaus and Theater der Welt, and premiered at the 2022 Theater der Welt, before productions in Canada, Germany, Sweden, and as part of the 2023 National Theatre Connections festival in London. The play was a finalist for the 2023 Governor General's Award for English-language drama.

Prince Faggot had its world premiere at Playwrights Horizons, in a co-production with Soho Rep, and ran from May 30, 2025 to August 3, 2025. It later transferred to Studio Seaview, where it ran Off-Broadway from September 10, 2025 to December 13, 2025. The play won the 2026 Lucille Lortel Award for Outstanding Play, the 2026 Governor General's Award for English-language drama, and was a finalist for the 2026 Lambda Literary Award for Drama.

=== Other performances ===
In 2024, Tannahill wrote a text for artist Miles Greenberg's nine hour durational performance, RESPAWN, at the Art Gallery of Ontario, which was both incorporated into the performance’s soundscape, and tattooed onto life-sized, sex doll sculptures bearing Greenberg’s likeness.

Tannahill's virtual reality performance Draw Me Close, co-produced by London's National Theatre and the National Film Board of Canada, premiered at the 2017 Tribeca Film Festival, and in a longer iteration at the Venice Biennale's inaugural extended reality section, Venice Immersive. The autobiographical piece, which featured a fusion of live performance, motion capture technology, virtual reality, and animation, had runs at London's Young Vic Theatre in 2019, and Toronto's Soulpepper Theatre in 2021.

Tannahill's work in contemporary dance includes choreographing and performing with Christopher House in Marienbad for the Toronto Dance Theatre in 2016; and writing the text for Xenos in 2018, and Outwitting the Devil in 2019, two shows by choreographer Akram Khan, which toured internationally to venues including Sadler's Wells Theatre, Festival d'Avignon, and the Lincoln Center for the Performing Arts. Now (newspaper) listed both Marienbad and Xenos as Top 10 dance shows of the 2010s decade.

Tannahill's production of Sheila Heti's play All Our Happy Days Are Stupid, which he directed with Erin Brubacher, premiered in 2014 at Videofag, more than a decade after Heti first began the script. Heti's struggle to write the play is one of the central plot-lines in her bestselling novel How Should a Person Be?. The production, which featured original songs by Dan Bejar, was remounted at The Kitchen in New York City in 2015.

== Political views ==
On November 23, 2018, Tannahill, a resident of Budapest at the time, read the entirety of Judith Butler's Gender Trouble over nine hours outside the Hungarian Parliament Building in protest of Hungarian Prime Minister Viktor Orbán's decision to revoke accreditation and funding for gender studies programs in the country.

On April 4, 2019, Tannahill and three collaborators staged a protest action during high tea at The Dorchester Hotel. The action was in response to Brunei's proposed introduction of laws that would make homosexual sex and adultery punishable by stoning to death. The Dorchester Collection is a luxury hotel operator owned by the Brunei Investment Agency. Video documentation of the protest action, and Tannahill's forceful removal from the hotel, went viral soon after it was posted online.

== Personal life ==
Tannahill married actor Brandon Flynn in October 2024.

== Bibliography ==
=== Fiction ===
- The Living Realm, 2026
- The Listeners, 2021
- Liminal, 2018

=== Plays ===
- Prince Faggot, 2025
- Is My Microphone On?, 2021
- Declarations, 2018
- Botticelli in the Fire, 2016
- Sunday in Sodom, 2016
- Concord Floral, 2014
- Late Company, 2013
- Age of Minority: 3 Solo Plays, 2013

=== Non-fiction ===
- The Videofag Book, 2018
- Theatre of the Unimpressed: In Search of Vital Drama, 2015

== Film ==
Year	Title	Role	Notes	Ref.
2027	Summer In Heat	Writer	Directed by Levan Akin	

== Television ==
Year	Title	Role	Notes	Ref.
2024	The Listeners	Writer	Directed by Janicza Bravo	

== Awards and nominations ==
Year	Award	Category	Work	Result	Ref.
2026	Lucille Lortel Award	Outstanding Play	Prince Faggot	Won	
2026	Drama Desk Award	Outstanding Play	Prince Faggot	Nominated	
2026	Outer Critics Circle Award	Outstanding New Off-Broadway Play	Prince Faggot	Nominated	
2026	Drama League Awards	Outstanding Play	Prince Faggot	Nominated	
2026	Lambda Literary Awards	Lambda Literary Award for Drama	Prince Faggot	Nominated	
2026	Governor General's Literary Awards	Governor General's Award for English-language drama	Prince Faggot	Won	
2026	Dorian Award	Outstanding Off-Broadway Play	Prince Faggot	Won	
2026	Dorian Award	Outstanding Writing for an Off-Broadway Production	Prince Faggot	Won	
2022	Dora Mavor Moore Awards	Dora Mavor Moore Award for Best Original Play (General Theatre)	Draw Me Close	Nominated	
2021	Giller Prize		The Listeners	Shortlisted	
2021	Governor General's Literary Awards	Governor General's Award for English-language drama	Is My Microphone On?	Nominated	
2018	Governor General's Literary Awards	Governor General's Award for English-language drama	Botticelli in the Fire	Won	
2016	Dora Mavor Moore Awards	Dora Mavor Moore Award for Best Original Play (General Theatre)	Botticelli in the Fire	Nominated	
2016	Governor General's Literary Awards	Governor General's Award for English-language drama	Concord Floral	Nominated	
2015	Dora Mavor Moore Awards	Dora Mavor Moore Award for Best Original Play (Independent Theatre)	Concord Floral	Won	
2014	Governor General's Literary Awards	Governor General's Award for English-language drama	Age of Minority	Won	
