= Heather Christian =

American singer, playwright, and composer

- Born: New Orleans, Louisiana
- Occupations: Composer, librettist, singer
- Years active: 2004-present

Heather Christian is an American singer, playwright, composer and MacArthur Fellow best known for 2017's Animal Wisdom at the Bushwick Starr and Oratorio for Living Things, which ran Off Broadway at Ars Nova in the spring of 2022, along with a 2025 revival at Signature Theatre Company.

== Early life ==
Christian was born in New Orleans and raised in Natchez, Mississippi. Growing up, she was involved in children's choir and high school theater. She is a graduate of the Tisch School of the Arts at New York University, where she studied experimental theater.

== Career ==
=== Theater ===
Christian served as the composer for the Folger Shakespeare Library production of As You Like It in 2017. Later that year, she debuted Animal Wisdom, an autobiographical work based on supernatural encounters from her childhood in Natchez. The work's original run at the Bushwick Starr received several extensions and a new film version of the piece was released on Broadway on Demand in 2021. The work was later revived at The Signature Theatre in May 2026.

I am Sending You the Sacred Face, a drag opera about Mother Teresa composed by Christian and performed by Joshua William Gelb, was released online as part of the Theater in Quarantine series in December 2020.

In spring 2022, the Ars Nova theater presented Christian's choral work Oratorio for Living Things as an Off-Broadway production directed by Lee Sunday Evans. For her work, she received a special Drama Desk Award, with the show also winning three Lucille Lortel Awards from six nominations.

In 2024, "Terce: A Practical Breviary" (the second of eight planned works in her Breviary Cycle) premiered as part of the Prototype Festival. Co-Produced by HERE Arts Center and The Space at Irondale, the show ran from January 10th through February 2nd and received critical acclaim, including a New York Times Critic's Pick. Christian received a special citation for Terce's composition from the New York Drama Critics' Circle.

=== Soundtracks ===
Christian is a frequent collaborator of director Janicza Bravo, scoring her 2017 feature Lemon as well as many short films. In 2020, she provided music for The Craft: Legacy, directed by Zoe Lister-Jones. She also scored two Adult Swim television programs: The Shivering Truth and Teenage Euthanasia.

=== Other work ===
In 2020, Christian contributed the episode "Prime: A Practical Breviary" to Soundstage, a podcast produced by theatrical group Playwrights Horizons.

Christian fronts a band called Heather Christian and the Arbornauts.

== Personal life ==
Christian is based in New York City. She was raised Catholic and served as a musician for the Catholic Church until the age of 26. Although she no longer considers herself a member of the Church, she describes herself as spiritual.

== Awards and honors ==
Christian received an Obie Award for her composition of The World is Round, which ran at Brooklyn Academy of Music in 2014. She also received a special Drama Desk Award for Oratorio for Living Things, along with a Lucille Lortel Award nomination for Outstanding Musical. She is a 2025 MacArthur Fellow.
