= Public Obscenities =

2024 play by Shayok Misha Chowdhury

Public Obscenities is a 2024 bilingual play written by Shayok Misha Chowdhury.

== Synopsis ==
Bengali-American Ph.D. student Choton, who speaks both English and Bangla, is visiting Kolkata with his African American boyfriend Raheem to film a "queer archiving project".

== Accolades ==
It was one of the finalists for the 2024 Pulitzer Prize for Drama.

The cast won the 2023 Drama Desk Ensemble Award.

== See also ==
- Satyajit Ray – discussed in the play as part of the Bengali neorealist movement
