= Tlaloc Rivas =

Mexican-American writer, producer, and theatre director

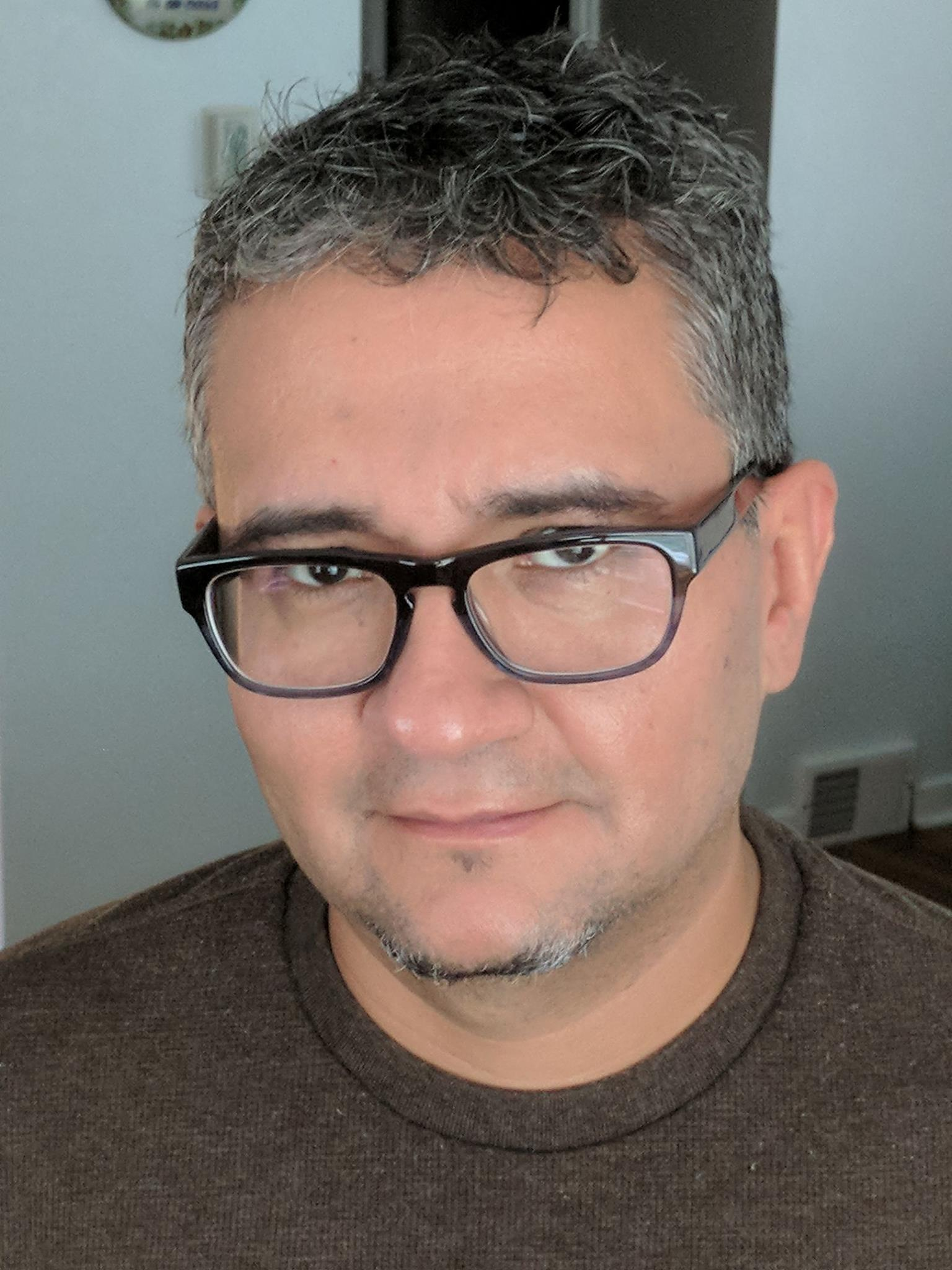
- Rivas in 2020
- Born: June 26 Baja California, Mexico
- Occupation: Playwright, Director, Educator
- Education: Cabrillo College; University of California, Santa Cruz (BA); University of Washington, Seattle (MFA)

Website
- www.tlalocrivas.com

Tlaloc Rivas is a Chicano (Mexican-American) playwright, director, and educator. He is one of the co-founders of the Latinx Theatre Commons, which works side by side with HowlRound to revolutionize American theater and to highlight and promote the contributions and presence of Latinx/e in theatre. Central to Tlaloc's work is the Latine experience, but also exploring the American experience through the lens' of underrepresented voices. He primarily focuses on writing and directing plays that significantly explore Latine social and political histories and identities. Additionally, Tlaloc has also translated and adapted plays from the Spanish language and directed Spanish-language and bilingual plays such as Mariela en el Desierto by Karen Zacarias and classical works such as Peribáñez y el Comendador de Ocaña.

== Early life and education ==
Tlaloc Rivas was born in Tijuana, Baja California, Mexico to parents who were both involved in the Chicano Movement from the late 1960s into the 1970s while living in San Diego. His honorary godfather at his baptism was civil rights leader Rodolfo Gonzales, founder of the Crusade for Justice movement. Tlaloc is of Indigenous (Cora People/Nayarit), Afro-Venezuelan, Mexican, and Spanish descent and named after the Aztec God of Rain and Fertility, Tlaloc. He spent his early childhood in San Diego, California and Escondido, California and has noted that his family members were oral storytellers. The early exposure he had to storytelling helped Tlaloc shape and develop his own writing and storytelling skills at a young age.

Tlaloc's family later moved to Watsonville, California where he was marked by the events of the Watsonville Canning Strike, the Gomez v City of Watsonville Supreme Court voting rights decision, and the 1989 Loma Prieta earthquake. He deferred college for a few years to care for his siblings (while his mother earned her nursing degree) and to remain involved as a community organizer and voting rights activist. In 1989, he began interning with El Teatro Campesino on several productions. Tlaloc then turned that experience by co-founding Chicano TheatreWorks, a company created in response to the passage of California Proposition 187.

Tlaloc transferred to UC Santa Cruz in 1993. He began acting and assisting on productions with Shakespeare Santa Cruz (now Santa Cruz Shakespeare), but transitioned into directing with a production of The Colored Museum by George C. Wolfe, which toured to South Central Los Angeles communities in the wake of the 1992 Los Angeles riots with support from Stevenson College. His senior thesis production of The Shrunken Head of Pancho Villa by acclaimed playwright Luis Valdez was honored with a Dean of the Arts award, Chancellor's Honors, and the Regents Presidential Award for Excellence in Undergraduate Research. Tlaloc graduated with these honors from UC Santa Cruz in 1995.

After graduation he departed Chicano TheatreWorks to intern at the renowned Hispanic Playwrights Project (now Pacific Playwrights Festival) to work on the development of new work by Latine playwrights such Octavio Solis, Anne García-Romero, and Rogelio Martinez. It was here that Tlaloc met playwright and HPP director José Cruz González and the acclaimed playwright and teacher Maria Irene Fornes, where both encouraged him to begin writing for the stage.

In 1996, Tlaloc was accepted into the Professional Directors Training Program at the University of Washington where he studied under M. Burke Walker (founder of the acclaimed Empty Space Theatre) and Valerie Curtis-Newton, and trained extensively in Tadashi Suzuki's method of actor training - which emphasizes stylized body work and physicality drawn from elements of traditional Japanese theater. At UW School of Drama, he would direct regional premieres of plays such as José Rivera's The House of Ramon Iglesia, Patient A by Lee Blessing, The Pitchfork Disney by Philip Ridley, and Octavio Solis' El Paso Blue. During his final year of graduate studies, he received a Directing Fellowship with the Oregon Shakespeare Festival, serving as assistant director on their productions of Othello, The Good Person of Szechwan, and directing a staged reading of Steven Dietz's Force of Nature. Tlaloc graduated with a Master of Fine Arts degree in Directing from the UW School of Drama in 1999.

== Career ==
Tlaloc was introduced to the theater in two different ways: first with El Teatro Campesino (ETC) as a production intern, then serving as assistant director on La Virgen del Tepeyac by Luis Valdez, a production that would transfer to the Fort Mason Center in San Francisco. At ETC he was introduced Theatre of the Sphere, a philosophy and training based on neo-Mayan cosmologies to strengthen the actor's physical body, balance, precision, and flexibility - as well as leadership, collaboration, vulnerability and trust.

Secondly, he began acting at UC Santa Cruz with Audrey Stanley, founder of Shakespeare Santa Cruz (SSC), where she introduced him to acting and directing with classical texts. Tlaloc would assist on several productions at SSC, including Ronald Harwood's The Dresser, Paul Whitworth's translation of Lope de Vega's The Rape of Tamar, and Shakespeare's King Lear.

While still an undergraduate student, Tlaloc served as artistic director of Chicano TheatreWorks, a company which he also helped establish. Then, while he was in graduate school, he further dived into his professional career as a director with a position as Artistic Associate for The Group Theatre in Seattle. Upon obtaining his MFA in Directing, Tlaloc was appointed interim artistic director for Venture Theater in Philadelphia before embarking on a freelance career.

From 2001 to 2003, Tlaloc was selected for the Career Development Program for Directors, administered by Theatre Communications Group and the National Endowment of the Arts. Through this program, he assisted and observed many stage directors, including Oskar Eustis on Homebody/Kabul, Emily Mann on Anna in the Tropics, Joseph Chaikin on Shut-Eye, and Lisa Peterson on Chavez Ravine by Culture Clash.

In 2004, he moved to New York City and continued his freelance career as a director, working with companies such as INTAR Theatre, 52nd Street Project, and Mabou Mines. In 2009, Tlaloc directed an acclaimed production of The Caucasian Chalk Circle by Bertolt Brecht at Queens College and the following year joined the faculty at the University of Missouri-St. Louis. From 2011-2012, Tlaloc devised and directed The New World, a community-created work based on Shakespeare's The Tempest set in the immigrant-majority neighborhood of Cherokee Street, St. Louis. It was the inaugural production for Shakespeare in the Streets produced by Shakespeare Festival of St. Louis - which was named "Most Ambitious Production" from the St. Louis Post-Dispatch.

In 2012, he joined the faculty at The University of Iowa as an Assistant Professor of Theatre where he also co-developed and taught at the university's first Latino Studies program. In 2015, he directed his most recognized original written piece: Johanna: Facing Forward. Also during 2015, Johanna: Facing Forward brought him to runner-up in the MetLife Nuestras Voces Playwriting Competition.

In 2018, he joined his spouse, Megan Monaghan Rivas, at Carnegie Mellon School of Drama, where he received the inaugural Presidential Postdoctoral Fellowship from the College of Fine Arts. While in residence at CMU, he taught the school's first Latinx Theatre course and developed two new works for stage: Divisadero (original work) and The Revolution of Evelyn Serrano, based on the acclaimed young adult novel written by Sonia Manzano of Sesame Street fame.

Tlaloc continues to write and/or direct plays across the country. He currently serves on the Acting Faculty at the David Geffen School of Drama (DGSD), Lecturer for the Department of Theatre, Dance, and Performance Studies (TDPS) at Yale University, and as Associate Professor in Residence in Theatre Studies at the University of Connecticut.

== New Play Development ==
Tlaloc Rivas has been a steadfast advocate and creative force in the development of new work within the American theater. He has contributed significantly to the nurturing and realization of new plays by both emerging and established playwrights, bringing a rigorous, community-driven, and dramaturgically rich approach in writing workshops and retreats. Among his most notable collaborations is his long-term work on Mexodus, a musical co-created by Brian Quijada and Nygel D. Robinson that explores the untold stories of Black and Brown solidarity along the U.S.-Mexico border during the era of the Underground Railroad. Since the project’s inception, Tlaloc has supported Mexodus through numerous developmental stages and productions, including workshops and presentations at New York Stage & Film (2021), Hi-ARTS NYC (2022), New Harmony Project (2023), all the way towards its co-world premiere at Baltimore Center Stage and Mosaic Theater in DC (2024).

From 2004 to 2009, Tlaloc was deeply immersed in the New York City new play development scene, working with a range of influential institutions including New Dramatists, the Dramatic Writing Program at NYU Tisch, Cherry Lane Theater, Lark Play Development Center, and The Public Theater. During this formative period, he contributed to the development of numerous groundbreaking works, providing dramaturgical support, directing readings and workshops, and collaborating closely with emerging playwrights whose voices would come to shape the future of American theater. Among the writers he worked with were Kristoffer Diaz on The Elaborate Entrance of Chad Deity (Pulitzer Prize Drama finalist), Katori Hall on The Hopewell, Kenneth Lin on Fallow, Jen Silverman on Nila, and Raúl Castillo on Missíon. His work in these spaces not only helped bring vital new stories to the stage but also solidified his reputation as a champion of bold and diverse voices in contemporary playwriting.

During his tenure at the University of Iowa from 2012-2018, he provided mentorship and professional development to MFA playwrights in the nationally recognized Iowa Playwrights Workshop. He played a pivotal role in recruiting Marisela Treviño Orta to the program, where he supported the development of several of her plays, including Wolf at the Door, Alcira, Shoe, and American Triage, exemplifying his commitment to centering Latinx voices in the new play landscape. Tlaloc also directed and dramaturged plays by a wide range of MFA writers including Deborah Yarchun, Sarah Cho, Emily Dendinger, and Eric Micha Holmes—each of whom benefited from his deep commitment to collaborative process, rigorous storytelling, and inclusive production practices.

In his role as artistic coordinator of UIowa's Darwin Turner Action Theatre (DTAT), Tlaloc further championed urgent and socially-engaged work by BIPOC artists. Under his leadership, the program produced The Every 28 Hours Plays, a national theatrical event addressing systemic racism and police violence; Baltimore by Kirsten Greenidge, a powerful exploration of race and privilege on a college campus; and Carnival Time is Iré For You And Me by Micah Ariel James, a celebratory and poignant new work exploring Afro-Caribbean identity and ritual. Through these productions, Tlaloc ensured that DTAT remained a vital platform for student voices and activist performance.

During the COVID-19 pandemic, Tlaloc launched the Latinx Superfriends Playwriting Hour, a virtual series that brought together playwrights from across the country to foster community, offer mutual support, and engage in candid conversations about the craft and career of playwriting. The series featured intimate and wide-ranging discussions with acclaimed writers including José Rivera, Colman Domingo, Georgina Escobar, Octavio Solis, Charise Castro-Smith, Diana Burbano, Hilary Bettis, Josefina López, and Mando Alvarado. The initiative became a vital source of connection and inspiration for Latine playwrights during a period of isolation and upheaval, and further solidified Tlaloc’s role as a mentor and advocate for the next generation of theater-makers.

In 2021, after contributing to four separate conferences at The New Harmony Project as both a writer and director, Tlaloc was invited to join the organization’s Strategic Planning Committee. His involvement helped shape a new vision for The New Harmony Project—centered on transparency, equity, and anti-oppression practices in support of artists and their stories. Recognizing his leadership and long-standing commitment to inclusive storytelling, Tlaloc was invited to join the NHP Board of Directors in 2022, where he continues to serve and advocate for systemic change within the American new play development landscape.

== Written works ==
As a self-trained playwright, Tlaloc credits his extensive work with playwrights as the foundation of his own development as a dramatist. His collaborative practice has served as a vital form of artistic training, honed through decades of workshops, readings, and residencies. He has been mentored and inspired by such influential figures as María Irene Fornés, Jose Cruz Gonzalez. Migdalia Cruz, Karen Hartman, Luis Alfaro, Young Jean Lee, and others, whose insights have deeply shaped his understanding of dramatic structure, language, and political urgency onstage.

=== Crayon Sun ===
Tlaloc Rivas' newest work Crayon Sun is a one-act elegy inspired by the events of a mass shooting on May 24, 2022, at Robb Elementary School in Uvalde, Texas. It follows Mando, a young Chicano struggling with the complexities of his mother’s absence while Valoria, a fiercely imaginative Latina, helps him confront his pain through art and storytelling. Their journey unfolds against a backdrop of a school lockdown, as the adults around them navigate their own unresolved grief. A mysterious figure, Belsey, urges the children to face deeper truths about abandonment and belonging.

The play has received numerous citations, including: Semifinalist for the 2025 Blue Ink Playwriting Award (American Blues Theatre, IL), Semifinalist for the 2025 Eugene O'Neill Playwrights Conference (Waterford, CT), and public readings at Origins Theatre Festival (Proscenium Theatre Company, NYC) and WaterWorks Festival of New Work (LiveArts, Charlottesville, VA).

=== Divisadero ===
Divisadero is a full-length play first developed at The New Harmony Project in 2019. Since its inception, the play has garnered attention for its searing emotional honesty and potent exploration of grief, identity, and cultural erasure. It has received multiple citations, but despite its accolades (and due to the Covid-19 pandemic), Divisadero has yet to receive a fully-supported production.

Divisadero arose from personal loss—specifically, the death of a close friend and fellow theater director Beatrice Terry Lopez, whose Latiné identity was systematically erased by a national theater institution after her death. Moved by the injustice of this erasure, Tlaloc crafted the play as a deeply personal and political response to the silencing of cultural identities in U.S. institutions.

Set in the Bay Area of California, Divisadero follows a Chicana mother mourning her daughter's death while navigating an emotionally fraught relationship with her daughter's widow. The play interrogates cultural appropriation, generational trauma, and the pursuit of whiteness as survival—laying bare the tensions between assimilation and authenticity.

Divisadero is a work by Tlaloc that focuses on the preservation of Latiné history and identity. The piece addresses themes of cultural memory and the socio-political challenges facing Latiné communities.

=== The Revolution of Evelyn Serrano ===
Inspired by the acclaimed young adult novel by Sonia Manzano, best known for her groundbreaking role as "Maria" on Sesame Street, the story is set in East Harlem during the pivotal year of 1969. The original novel follows a young Puerto Rican girl, Evelyn, whose world is upended when she encounters the Young Lords—a revolutionary activist group fighting for racial justice, self-determination, and dignity for Puerto Rican and Latinx communities. As Evelyn begins to understand the political and cultural forces shaping her neighborhood, she finds her own voice and sense of purpose amid the community-led takeover of the First Methodist Church on the Upper East Side, a historic moment in Latinx resistance.

With Manzano’s blessing, Tlaloc reimagined the story as a play-within-a-play, framing the narrative through a contemporary lens. In his adaptation, a group of Latinx college students gather at a Nuyorican radio station on Christmas Eve to stage a commemorative broadcast honoring the Young Lords and the 1969 church takeover. Through radio drama, spoken word, and reenactments, the students breathe new life into Evelyn’s story—bridging the past and present, and illuminating the enduring relevance of radical resistance and cultural pride.

Commissioned by the New Hazlett Theater in Pittsburgh, the play was developed and performed with the BFA acting students of Carnegie Mellon School of Drama. The production’s critical and popular success led to a filmed version, which was subsequently streamed as part of the 2021 Edinburgh Fringe Festival and featured in the Latino Theater Company’s RE:Encuentro 2021 Virtual Theatre Festival in Los Angeles. The work continues to resonate as a powerful celebration of Latinx youth, activism, and ancestral memory.

=== Johanna: Facing Forward ===
Tlaloc Rivas' original work Johanna: Facing Forward is based on actual events. In 2007, Joanna Orozco was shot in the face by her ex-boyfriend. Johanna, who was only 18 years old at the time, went through intense recovery and post-recovery she went on to advocate for the rights of victims of domestic violence. To write his play, Rivas focused on the special series that Rachel Dissell wrote about Joanna Orozco for The Plain Dealer.

In its entirety, Johanna: Facing Forward is a bilingual play that primarily grapples with abusive relationships, assault and trauma, and survivor empowerment. It received its world premiere at the Cleveland Public Theatre in 2015.

=== Other plays ===
Additional works can be found on the New Play Exchange website.

== Awards and honors ==
Rivas has been the recipient of the following:

- Selection for Waterworks New Play Festival (Live Arts Theatre) for Crayon Sun, 2025
- Semi-finalist for Eugene O'Neill Theater Center Playwrights Conference for Crayon Sun, 2025
- Selection for Origins Play Festival (Proscaenium Theatre Company, NYC) for Crayon Sun, 2024
- Semi-finalist for Blue Ink Playwriting Award (American Blues Theater) for Crayon Sun
- Finalist for Blue Ink Playwriting Award (American Blues Theater) for Divisadero, 2023
- Semi-Finalist for Bay Area Playwrights Festival for Lorelei/Maypearl, 2021
- Selection for Creative Residency for The New Harmony Project, 2019
- Finalist for Creative Residency @ SPACE on Ryder Farm for Divisadero, 2019
- Semi-finalist for Eugene O'Neill Theater Center Playwrights Conference for Divisadero, 2019
- Semi-finalist for Bay Area Playwrights Festival for Divisadero, 2019
- Runner-Up in MetLife Nuestras Voces Playwriting Competition for Johanna: Facing Forward, 2015
- Sir John Gielgud Fellowship in Classical Directing from Stage Directors & Choreographers Foundation, 2014–2015
- Most Ambitious Production, The New World - St. Louis Post-Dispatch Judy Awards, 2012
- Person of the Year in NYTheatre.com for directing Summer and Smoke and Five Kinds of Silence, 2008
- NEA/TCG Career Development Program for Directors, 2001–2003

== Affiliations ==
Tlaloc has been affiliated with the following:

- Co-founder of the Latinx Theatre Commons
- Presidential Post-Doctoral Fellow at Carnegie Mellon School of Drama
- Usual Suspect of New York Theatre Workshop
- Member of Dramatists Guild
- Member of Literary Managers and Dramaturgs of the Americas
- Associate Member of Stage Directors and Choreographers
- Member of The National Association of Latino Arts and Cultures
- Writer for HowlRound, A Journal for the Theater Commons

== Productions supervised ==
=== Professional and Academic productions ===
Tlaloc has supervised the following productions both professionally and within the academy:

| Production | Original author | Theatre | Year |
|---|---|---|---|
| Living Dead in Denmark | Qui Nguyen | Connecticut Repertory Theatre | 2025 |
| Mexodus (as dramaturg) | Brian Quijada, Nygel D. Robinson | Berkeley Repertory Theatre, Baltimore Center Stage, Mosaic Theater Company of DC | 2024 |
| A Doctor's Dilemma | Tlaloc Rivas fr. Bernard Shaw | Connecticut Repertory Theatre | 2024 |
| Seven Spots on the Sun | Martin Zimmerman | Connecticut Repertory Theatre | 2022 |
| A Midsummer Night's Dream | William Shakespeare | Notre Dame Shakespeare Festival | 2021 |
| The Revolution of Evelyn Serrano | Tlaloc Rivas fr. Sonia Manzano | Edinburgh Festival Fringe, Los Angeles Theatre Center, New Hazlett Theater | 2021 |
| Collective Rage: A Play in 5 Betties | Jen Silverman | Oberlin College | 2020 |
| The Three Musketeers | Megan Monaghan Rivas fr. Alexandre Dumas | University of Evansville | 2019 |
| La Fuerza de Antígona | Tlaloc Rivas fr. Sophocles | Theatre School at DePaul | 2019 |
| By The Way, Meet Vera Stark | Lynn Nottage | University of Iowa | 2018 |
| Mr. Burns, a Post-Electric Play | Anne Washburn (writer), Michael Friedman (music) | University of Iowa | 2017 |
| Abigail/1702 | Roberto Aguirre-Sacasa | Merrimack Repertory Theatre | 2016 |
| Peribañez | Félix Lope de Vega (trans. Tlaloc Rivas) | Quantum Theatre | 2016 |
| Wit | Margaret Edson | Aurora Theatre Company | 2016 |
| Luck of the Irish | Kirsten Greenidge | University of Iowa | 2015 |
| In Love and Warcraft | Madhuri Shekar | Halcyon Theatre Company | 2015 |
| Johanna: Facing Forward | Tlaloc Rivas | Cleveland Public Theatre, University of Kansas | 2015 |
| Mariela en el desierto | Karen Zacarías | Aurora Theatre Company, Los Angeles Theatre Center | 2014 |
| Water by the Spoonful | Quiara Alegria Hudes | University of Iowa | 2013 |
| Cymbeline | William Shakespeare | Richmond Shakespeare Festival | 2012 |
| The New World (based on The Tempest) | Nancy Bell fr. William Shakespeare | Shakespeare Festival of St. Louis | 2012 |
| Tartuffe | Moliere | University of Missouri-St.Louis | 2012 |
| The House of the Spirits | Caridad Svich, fr. Isabel Allende | University of Missouri-St.Louis | 2011 |
| Stop Kiss | Diana Son | University of Missouri-St.Louis | 2011 |
| La Llorona: A Love Story | Kathleen Anderson Culebro | Amphibian Stage Productions | 2010 |
| Summer and Smoke | Tennessee Williams | Big Sky Theater Company | 2008 |
| Five Kinds of Silence | Shelagh Stephenson | Boundless Theatre Company | 2008 |
| Generic Hispanic | Noemi de la Puente | Puerto Rican Traveling Theatre | 2007 |
| The Dumb Waiter | Harold Pinter | Ward 10 Productions | 2006 |
| The Crucible | Arthur Miller | Penobscot Theater Company | 2004 |
| undone | Andrea Thome | INTAR New Works Lab | 2004 |
| DisappearingAct | Martha Michaela Brown | Philadelphia Fringe Festival | 2003 |
| Angel | Tameka Jones | Philadelphia Young Playwrights | 2002 |
| La Posada Mágica | Octavio Solis | Teatro Visíon | 2001 |
| Rocket Man | Steven Dietz | Venture Theatre Company | 2000 |
| El Paso Blue | Octavio Solis | Venture Theatre Company | 1999 |
| The Lady from the Sea | Henrik Ibsen | UW School of Drama | 1999 |
| Measure for Measure | William Shakespeare | UW School of Drama | 1998 |
| La Casa de Bernarda Alba | Federico Garcia Lorca (trans. Tlaloc Rivas) | UW School of Drama | 1998 |
| Cloud Tectonics | Jose Rivera | The Group Theatre | 1998 |
| The Pitchfork Disney | Philip Ridley | UW School of Drama | 1997 |
| The House of Ramon Iglesia | Jose Rivera | Ethnic Cultural Theatre | 1997 |
| Patient A | Lee Blessing | UW School of Drama | 1997 |
| El Amor de don Perlimplín con Belisa en su jardín | Federico Garcia Lorca (trans. Tlaloc Rivas) | UW School of Drama | 1996 |
| Mud | Maria Irene Fornes | Dallas Theatre Center - Big D Festival | 1996 |
| My Visits With MGM (My Grandmother Marta) | Edit Villarreal | Chicano TheatreWorks | 1995 |
| Ardiente paciencia (Burning Patience) | Antonio Skarmeta (trans. Tlaloc Rivas) | Chicano TheatreWorks | 1994 |
| No Saco Nada De La Escuela (Actos) | Luis Valdez & Others | Chicano TheatreWorks | 1993 |

=== Additional productions ===
Rivas had supervised the following:

| Production | Original author | College/University | Year |
|---|---|---|---|
| Collective Rage: A Play in Five Betties | Jen Silverman | Oberlin College | 2020 |
| The Three Musketeers | Megan Monaghan Rivas fr. Alexandre Dumas | University of Evansville | 2019 |
| By The Way, Meet Vera Stark | Lynn Nottage | The University of Iowa | 2018 |
| Mr. Burns: A post-electric play | Anne Washburn | The University of Iowa | 2017 |
| Cut and Run | Eric Micha Holmes | Iowa New Play Festival | 2016 |
| Baltimore | Kirsten Greenidge | The University of Iowa | 2016 |
| Johanna: Facing Forward | Tlaloc Rivas | The University of Kansas | 2015 |
| Luck of the Irish | Kirsten Greenidge | The University of Iowa | 2015 |
| Water by the Spoonful | Quiara Alegría Hudes | The University of Iowa | 2013 |
| For the Falls | Emily Dendinger | Iowa New Play Festival | 2013 |
| Tartuffe | Molière, adaptation by Ranjit Bolt | The University of Missouri–St. Louis | 2012 |
| The House of the Spirits | Isabel Allende, adaptation by Caridad Svich | The University of Missouri–St. Louis | 2011 |
| Stop Kiss | Diana Son | The University of Missouri–St. Louis | 2011 |
| The Crucible | Arthur Miller | The University of Missouri–St. Louis | 2010 |
| The Caucasian Chalk Circle | Bertolt Brecht | Queens College | 2010 |
| 1984 | George Orwell (adaptation) | University of the Arts | 2003 |
| The Servant of Two Masters | Carlo Goldoni adaptation by Constance Congdon | University of the Arts | 2002 |
| Love's Labour's Lost | Shakespeare | Gloucester County Institute of Technology | 2001 |
| Fen | Caryl Churchill | Bryn Mawr College | 2001 |
| Lady from the Sea | Henrik Ibsen | University of Washington School of Drama | 1999 |
| El Paso Blue | Octavio Solis | University of Washington School of Drama | 1998 |
| The Pitchfork Disney | Philip Ridley | University of Washington School of Drama | 1998 |
| The House of Bernarda Alba | Federico García Lorca | University of Washington School of Drama | 1997 |
| Mystery and Manners | Flannery O'Connor (adaptation) | University of Washington School of Drama | 1997 |
| Patient A | Lee Blessing | University of Washington School of Drama | 1997 |
| The Love of Don Perlimplín and Belisa in the Garden | Federico García Lorca | University of Washington School of Drama | 1996 |
| The Shrunken Head of Pancho Villa | Luis Valdez | University of California Santa Cruz | 1995 |
