= Latinx Theatre Commons =

American theatre movement

The Latinx Theatre Commons (LTC) is a national movement launched in 2012, which promotes Latino equity in American theater through convening, scholarship, advocacy, and art. The goals, activities, and methods of its actions are determined, championed, and carried out by the LTC's volunteer, self-organized steering committee of predominantly U.S.-based theater-makers and scholars of Latino theater, working together and with community partners around the country. The LTC was founded by eight well-known Latino playwrights, directors, and scholars, led by Karen Zacarias, who was hailed by American Theater Magazine as one of the most produced playwrights in the United States and who was named as a United States Artists Fellow in 2021. The group included Antonio Sonera, Kristoffer Diaz, Anne García-Romero, Lisa Portes, Tlaloc Rivas, Jose Luis Valenzuela, and Enrique Urueta. Abigail Vega served as the first LTC producer from 2014-2019. Beginning in May 2019, Armando Huipe succeeded Vega as the LTC Producer. Beginning in June 2021, Jacqueline Flores succeeded Huipe as the LTC Producer.

== History ==
LTC was founded as the Latino/a Theater Commons on May 19, 2012 when eight Latino theater-makers met to discuss the state of Latino theater in the US at the Arena Stage in Washington, DC. From this conversation, four initiatives were proposed with the aim of advancing the field of Latino theater, including a national festival of ten Latino plays to be produced at the Los Angeles Theatre Center; a biannual conference of new Latino works hosted by DePaul University in Chicago; Café Onda, an online platform for articles, blogs, live-streaming of events related to Latino theater; and a national convening of Latino theater-makers. Later that year, a Steering Committee was formed with an additional fourteen Latino theater-makers from around the country, to plan the national convening.

In September 2013, the group launched Café Onda, an online journal, which seeks to build connections among Latino theater-makers, and promote dialogue and deeper understanding at large. The platform serves as an online journal for the LTC and addresses cultural misrepresentations, inspires greater participation in the American theater field, and raises awareness for the body of Latino dramatic production.

Later in 2013, the LTC hosted the Boston Convening, which was the “first large-scale formal gathering of the Latina/o theater community since 1986.” The Convening brought together artists, scholars, and advocates of Latino theater to Emerson College, and engaged with Latino theater-makers in Chicago, Los Angeles, Dallas, Miami, and New York City via simultaneous video-conferencing, and around the country through live-streaming.

In November 2014, the LTC hosted its Second National Convening at the Los Angeles Theatre Center's Encuentro Latino theater festival. The Convening brought together the artists participating in the 10 productions featured at the month-long festival of Latino theater from around the US, with theater-makers, scholars, and advocates interested in Latino theater. Additionally, throughout the Encuentro, the LTC produced a series of nine Tertulias, public conversations with Festival and LA-based artists and scholars to contextualize and interrogate themes raised by the Encuentro.

Subsequent convenings of note have included the Carnival of New Latina/o Work (hosted at DePaul University in 2015 & 2018), LTC Regional Convenings aimed at convening local theater-makers and providing an opportunity for the LTC Steering Committee to assess its work, and International Convenings held at Encuentro de las Américas International Theatre Festivals.

In April 2018, the LTC co-hosted the Fornés Institute Symposium in partnership with Princeton University's Lewis Center for the Arts in honor of María Irene Fornés to encourage "diverse, intergenerational community of theater-makers the opportunity to gather and reflect on the many ways her influence continues to shape our work as artists, as writers, as scholars." This event and others hosted that year focused on María Irene Fornés were part of the LTC's Celebrando Fornes initiative and as part of the Fornes Institute, which was founded by the LTC.

In 2019, the LTC's Theater for Young Audiences (TYA) hosted the Sin Fronteras Festival and Convening featuring five plays written for youth audiences.

== Notable works ==
LTC's El Fuego Initiative: Fueling the American Theater with Latina/o Plays supports productions of Latino playwrights, including the 12 who were selected for the 2015 Carnaval of New Latina/o Work. In an unprecedented fashion, eighteen theater companies agreed to produce the playwrights’ works before they had been selected, demonstrating a commitment to championing Latino playwrights and “a profound trust in the Carnaval selection process.” At least 9 playwrights have received productions with support from El Fuego, many of which have been documented through the IGNITED series on Café Onda:

- Parachute Men by Mando Alvarado at Teatro Vista, Chicago, IL, September 10-October 16, 2016
- Woman on Fire by Marisela Treviño Orta at Camino Real Productions, Albuquerque, NM, September 29-October 16, 2016
- El Payaso by Emilio Rodriguez at Milagro (aka Miracle Theatre), Portland, OR, January 12–21, 2017
- Sweep by Georgina Escobar at Aurora Theatre, Lawrenceville, GA, February 10-March 5, 2017
- Más by Milta Ortiz at Su Teatro, Denver, CO, March 9–26, 2017
- The Sweetheart Deal by Diane Rodriguez at Latino Theatre Company, Los Angeles, CA, May 4-June 4, 2017
- Dancing in my Cockroach Killers by Magdalena Gómez at the GALA Hispanic Theatre and Puerto Rican Traveling Theater, Washington, DC, June 7-July 1, 2018
- GENTEFRIKATION by Emilio Rodriguez at Teatro Prometeo, Miami, FL, December 14–16, 2018
- Fur by Migdalia Cruz at Teatro Dallas, Dallas, TX, March 15–30, 2019.
- Their Dogs Came With Them by Virginia Grise by Borderlands Theater, Tucson, AZ, Spring 2019.

== Awards ==
On June 10, 2017, at the Theatre Communications Group National Conference held in Portland, Oregon, the LTC received the prestigious Peter Zeisler Memorial Award. In the acceptance speech, then-LTC Producer Abigail Vega stated: "By their very nature, commons challenge our transactional, market-based ideology and propose an alternative reality rooted in abundance and the greater good."

== Organizing structure ==
The Latinx Theatre Commons operates as a commons, wherein resources are shared with all who care for the resources. According to Indiana University's Digital Library of the Commons, "the commons is a general term for shared resources in which each stakeholder has an equal interest".

The work of the LTC is carried out by a volunteer Steering Committee of artists, scholars, and administrators from around the US who represent the complexity of the theater field. Steering Committee members work on a variety of subcommittees to advance the LTC initiatives, such as those listed on the timeline, reflecting the tenets of advocacy, art making, convening, and scholarship. The Steering Committee is refreshed every six months with an influx of new members who join in the work. Steering Committee members rotating off often join the LTC Advisory Committee. Communication technologies facilitate work among multiple participants simultaneously. At the hub of all the subcommittees is the LTC Producer, an independent contractor supported through the infrastructure provided by HowlRound: A Center for a Theatre Commons.

In January 2017, the Latinx Theater Commons adopted its current name in response to requests from the Steering Committee and community members at large and as an expression of its commitment to the principles of radical inclusion.

== Publications ==
The Latina/o Theatre Commons 2013 National Convening: A Narrative Report by Brian Herrera. Boston: Emerson College, 2015.
