= Elisa Marina Alvarado =

American director and actress

- Born: San Jose, California
- Citizenship: American
- Occupation: Artistic Director of San Jose-based Teatro Visión theatre company
- Known for: Directing and training
- Notable work: La Muerte Baila
- Parents: Blanca Alvarado (father); Jose J. Alvarado (mother)
- Awards: In 2010 Alvarado received the James McEntee Lifetime Achievement award.; In 2016 Theatre Bay Area selected her as one of 40 individuals pivotal in building the prestige of the Bay Area theater community.

Elisa Marina Alvarado is an American director, actress, educator, social worker, practitioner of traditional Mexican medicine, and dancer. Born in San Jose, California, Elisa Alvarado is a director and community organizer of Purépecha and Cuban descent. She was the founder and long-time Artistic Director of the San Jose-based Chicano Teatro Visión theater company. Teatro Visión is a Chicano theater company in the Latino theater scene, known especially for adapting classic Mexican novels and films for the stage. She is currently invested in two theater programs Codices and the Instituto de Teatro, which produce new works by Latino playwrights and offer comprehensive training in culture-based theater.

== Personal life and career ==
Elisa Alvarado was born in San Jose, California, to Blanca Alvarado and Jose J. Alvarado. Her parents encouraged her interest in books, the arts, and social justice. Her interest in theater and its potential for social change began in high school in the 1970s after a performance by El Teatro Campesino. Shortly after, she joined the San Jose-based theater company Teatro de la Gente and toured through San Jose, Mexico, and the American Southwest. After a few years with Teatro de la Gente, Alvarado and other women in Women in Teatro formed an all-female company called Teatro Huipil, named after the Huipil, a traditional garment worn by Indigenous women in Mexico and Central America.

After disagreement over vision for the company, many of the co-founders left, and Alvarado renamed the company Teatro Visión. Alvarado served as Artistic Director of Teatro Visión for 33 years, until 2017, when she gave the position to her protégé Rodrigo García.

On July 31, 2012, Alvarado suffered a stroke while at a family reunion in New Mexico. During her recovery, Teatro Visión underwent structural changes, reportedly aimed at improving sustainability.

Recently, Alvarado spent more time with the other programs that she belongs to or founded. In addition to her new works program Codices and her theatrical education program Instituto de Teatro, she is a member of the Native Family Outreach and Education project and the City of San José Independent Police Auditor Community Advisory Committee. She works as a Clinical Social Worker Specialist in San Jose and founded the Ethnomedicine Project that offers training in traditional Mexican medicine. She taught at San Jose State University, San Francisco State University, and Palo Alto High School.

== Awards ==
In 2010 Alvarado received the James McEntee Lifetime Achievement award, and in 2016 Theatre Bay Area selected her as one of 40 individuals pivotal in building the prestige of the Bay Area theater community. In 2010 she was selected for the Silicon Valley Business Journal's Women of Achievement, and received the City of San Jose's Cornerstone of the Arts award in 2017.

== Productions by Teatro Visión ==
List of Productions
Production Name	Author
The House on Mango Street	Adapted by Amy Ludwig, Written by Sandra Cisneros
La Muerte Baila	Rebecca Martinez and the Milagro Theatre Ensemble
Macario	B. Traven
Solitude	Evelina Fernández with Teatro Visión
Bless Me, Ultima	Rudolfo Anaya
Perla	Leonard Madrid
Taking Flight	Adriana Sevan
Ghosts of the River	Octavio Solis
The Woman Who Fell from the Sky	Victor Hugo Rascón Banda
La Casa en Mango Street	Sandra Cisneros
Hero	Luis Alfaro
School of the Americas	Jose Rivera
Visitor's Guide to Arivaca (Map Not to Scale)	Evangeline Ordaz
Bodas de Sangre (Blood Wedding)	Federico García Lorca
Dog Lady/Evening Star	Milcha Sanchez-Scott
La Victima	Teatro de la Esperanza
The Cook	Eduardo Machado
Electricidad	Luis Alfaro
¡CANTINFLAS!	Herbert Sigüenza
Santos & Santos	Octavio Solis
4 Guys Named José Y Un Mujer Named María	David Coffman and Dolores Prida
Real Women Have Curves	Josefína Lopez
Drive My Coche	Roy Conboy
Boxcar	Sylvia Gonzalez and Teatro Visión
Chilean Holiday	Guillermo Reyes
Lady From Havana	Luis Santeiro
Conjunto	Oliver Mayer
La Posada Mágica	Octavio Solis
Fefu and Her Friends	Maria Irene Fornés
Vieques	Jorge González
Heroes and Saints	Cherrie Moraga
The Kiss of the Spider Woman	Manuel Puig
La Posada Mágica	Octavio Solis
La Nona	Roberto M. Cossa
When El Cucui Walks	Roy Conboy
The True History of Coca Cola in Mexico	Aldo Velasco and Patrick Scott
Harvest Moon	José Cruz González
Rosita's Jalapeño Kitchen	Rodrigo Duarte Clarke
La Casa en Mango Street	Sandra Cisneros
La Carpa Aztlan Presents: I Don't Speak English Only	Antonio García
Spirit Dancing	José Cruz González
Real Women Have Curves	Josefina López
¡NO SE PAGA! ¡NO SE PAGA!	Dario Fo
Santos & Santos	Octavio Solís
La Víctima	Teatro de la Esperanza
Our Lady of the Tortilla	Luis Santiero
Good Grief Lolita!	Wilma Bonet
Rosario's Barrio	Rodrigo Duarte Clarke
The Last Angry Brown Hat	Alfredo Ramos
Las Nuevas Tamaleras	Alicia Mena
Novenas Narativas y Ofrendas Nuevomexicanos	Denise Chaves
Food for the Dead	Josefina López
Roosters	Milcha Sanchez-Scott
El Oro de los Quinteros Años	Arturo Gomez, Jaime Avarado, & Denis Marks with Teatro Visión
How Else Am I Supposed to Know I'm Still Alive?	Evelina Fernández
Brujerías	Rodrigo Duarte Clarke
Soldado Razo	Luis Valdez
Buy! Buy! Navidad!	Adapted by Lalo Cervantes, Written by Manuel Pickett
Conversations With My Grandmother Martha (MGM)	Edit Villareal
Brujerías	Rodrigo Duarte Clarke
Images of Deceit	Adapted by Teatro Huipil, Written by Anita Quintanilla
