= Anne García-Romero =

American dramatist

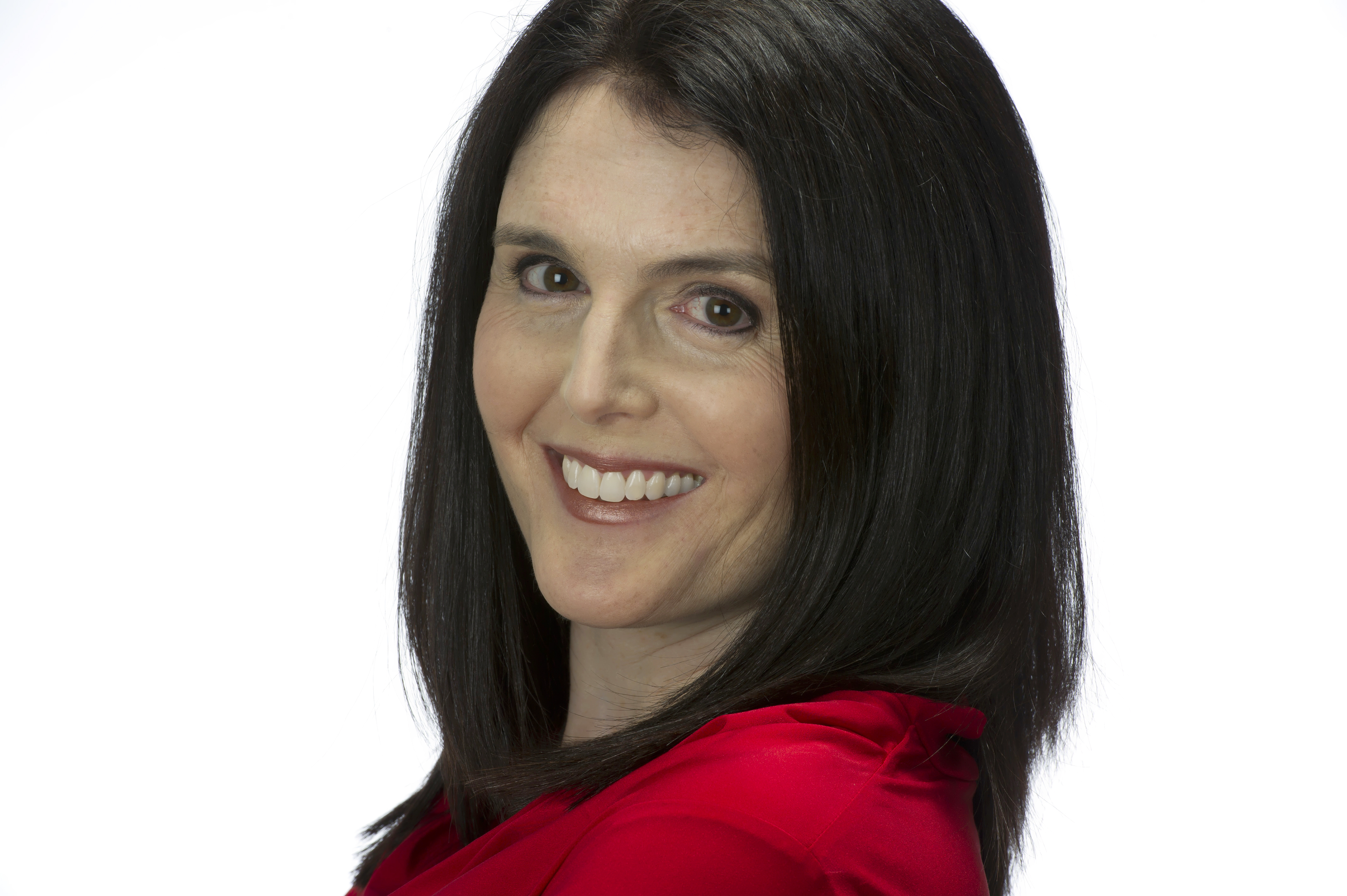
- Born: Newton, Massachusetts, U.S.
- Education: Occidental College (B.A.) Yale University (M.F.A.) University of California, Santa Barbara (Ph.D.)
- Occupations: Playwright, screenwriter, translator, scholar, professor
- Website: www.annegarciaromero.com

Anne García-Romero is an American playwright, screenwriter, scholar, and professor.

== Early life ==
Anne García-Romero was born to a mother of English, Irish and German descent and a father from Spain. Her hometown is Wellesley, Massachusetts, and she currently lives in South Bend, Indiana. Her work has been greatly influenced by her ethnic and cultural background, as many of her plays deal with issues affecting both Anglo and Latino communities. In her work, she tries to create bridges between these two communities. She has written many plays about Latin experiences, making complex Latin culture accessible to larger audiences. She also translates plays from Spanish to English, to make theatrical works from Spain and Latin America available to U.S. audiences. García-Romero received her B.A. in Theatre Arts at Occidental College and then went on to the Yale School of Drama, where she received her Masters in Fine Arts in Playwriting. She received her Ph.D. in Theatre Studies at UC Santa Barbara. García-Romero is also an alumna of New Dramatists in New York City, which is an organization that specifically supports and provides resources to talented playwrights.

García-Romero has taught at universities such as University of Southern California, California Institute of the Arts, Loyola Marymount University, Macalester College and Wesleyan University. She is an associate professor in the Department of Film, Television and Theatre at The University of Notre Dame. Some of the courses that she teaches are Playwriting, Script Analysis, and Story Structure.

García-Romero's book, Anne García-Romero: Collected Plays, includes Santa Concepción, Earthquake Chica, and Mary Peabody in Cuba. Playwright Octavio Solis reflects on her plays in this book, "Anne writes the stories we had always known by heart but had forgotten. With a purity at once spare and rich, she creates characters we not only feel we have broken bread with, but who have been in our dreams and crises."

Anne García-Romero works with the organization HowlRound as a co-founder of the Latinx Theatre Commons and their initiative The Fornés Institute. This includes a large network of other Latin artists who advocate for the Latin theater community at large. García-Romero has written essays for their journal, Café Onda. In one of her essays, she writes, "US culture in the twenty-first century continues to move from a mono-cultural to a multi-cultural experience. However, US theatre currently does not always reflect this reality and therefore can perpetuate an outdated narrative." Much of Anne García-Romero's work is to counter these mainstream, stereotypical, dominant narratives through a retelling of what it means to be Latin in the United States.

== Plays ==
=== Full length ===
- Staging the Daffy Dame
- Lorca in New York
- Provenance
- Paloma
- Earthquake Chica
- Pandorado
- Santa Concepción
- Mary Peabody in Cuba
- Mary Domingo
- Juanita's Statue

=== Short plays ===
- No More Maids
- Desert Longing or Las Adventureras
- Land of Benjamin Franklin
- Painting Velazquez

== Theatre Studies Scholarship ==
Anne García-Romero's book The Fornes Frame: Contemporary Latina Playwrights and the Legacy of Maria Irene Fornes was published in 2016 by the University of Arizona Press. García-Romero creates an archive of five contemporary Latina playwrights—Caridad Svich, Karen Zacarías, Elaine Romero, Cusi Cram, and Quiara Alegría Hudes—writing a chapter on each, touching on themes in their major works, and mapping them into a genealogy of Latina theatre helmed by Fornes. García-Romero's work explores how Latina playwrights began to find their footing in the American theatre in the 1960s through the work of Maria Irene Fornes (1930-2018). García-Romero builds upon prior of studies about Fornes' work, such as Fornés: Theater in the Present Tense by Diana Lynn Moroff (1996) and Conducting a Life: Reflections on the Life of María Irene Fornés edited by Maria Delgado and Caridad Svich (1999). Focusing on transnational ideas of Latinidad instead of focusing on one ethnic identity, García-Romero has chosen these five Latina playwrights because each originates from a different Latina background (whether ethnic, social, or geographical). The first chapter focuses on Fornes herself and serves to contextualize Fornes within Latina theatre. It offers biographical information in addition to contextualizing her artistic and pedagogical styles. García-Romero asserts that there are four cultural themes which link each playwright to the legacy of Fornes' work and to the larger body of Latina theatre: cultural multiplicity, supernatural interventions, Latina identity, and theatrical experimentation. García-Romero theorizes three waves of playwrights that studied with Fornes. The first wave began in the 1980s with playwrights like Cherrie Moraga and Milcha Sanchez-Scott. The second wave includes playwrights Migdalia Cruz and Carmelita Tropicana. The third wave began in the 1990s and continues through the present. The Fornes Frame is a tribute to the late playwright. García-Romero's work updates the narrative about Fornes, a foundational US playwright. García-Romero demonstrates how contemporary playwrights are actively involved in conversations about identity.
