= Lisa Portes =

American director and educator (born January 28th, 1967)

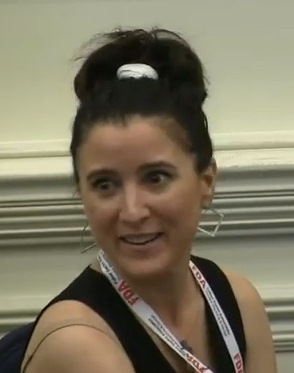
- Portes in 2019
- Born: January 28, 1967 (age 59); Madison, Wisconsin, U.S.
- Education: Oberlin College (BA); University of California, San Diego (MFA)
- Occupation: Director
- Years active: 1992–present
- Spouse: Carlos Murillo (m. 1999; div. 2025)
- Children: 2
- Relatives: Alejandro Portes (Father)

Lisa Portes (born January 28th, 1967) is a director, educator, and advocate. She is the Chair of the Theatre and Dance Department at University of California, San Diego. She serves on the board of the Theatre Communications Group, the Executive Board of the Society of Stage Directors and Choreographers, and is a founding member of the Latinx Theater Commons.

== Education ==
Portes attended Oberlin College where she graduated with honors with a degree of Bachelor of Arts in Theater in 1988. She received a Master of Fine Arts in Directing from the University of California, San Diego in 1992.

== Career ==
After graduating from the University of California, San Diego, Portes worked as a freelance director. She took up the position of associate artistic director of Soho Rep from 1996–1998. From 1992–1995, she was the artistic director of the former Theater E in San Diego. From 2000-2024, Portes worked at DePaul University, building her career until she led the three-year MFA Program while teaching classes. In 2024, she returned to La Jolla and has been the Chair of the Theatre and Dance Department since.

Primarily a director of new American plays and musicals, Portes' work has been seen regionally at California Shakespeare Theater, Guthrie Theater, Denver Center for the Performing Arts, Cincinnati Playhouse, South Coast Repertory, McCarter Theatre, and the John F. Kennedy Center for the Performing Arts. In Chicago she has directed for Steppenwolf Theatre Company, Goodman Theatre, Victory Gardens Theater, TimeLine Theatre Company, American Blues Theater, Silk Road Rising, Next Theatre, and Teatro Vista. New York credits include work at Playwrights Horizons, Soho Repertory Theatre, New York Theatre Workshop, The Flea Theater, and The Public Theater. Portes served as the Associate Director of the Tony Award-winning musical The Who's Tommy, and staged its international productions in Canada, Germany, and the U.K, as well as its 20th anniversary remount at the Stratford Theatre Festival in 2013. In 2016, Portes was awarded the SDC Zelda Fichandler Award.

Portes has directed plays around the United States ranging from the Kennedy Center in Washington DC, Steppenwolf theater, and the Guthrie Theatre located in Minneapolis. She has also participated in the Latino Theater Festival at Goodman Theatre, as well as the Ignition Festival at the Victory Gardens Theater.

=== Works ===
Some of Portes's productions include This is Modern Art a play written by Idris Goodwin and Kevin Coval. Other plays directed by Portes include Ghostwritten, After a Hundred Years, Concerning Strange Device from the Distant West, all written by Naomi Iizuka. Portes has also directed plays by Julia Cho such as The Piano Teacher. Some more of her recent works include Offspring of the Cold War written by Carlos Murillo and Wilder: An Erotic Chamber Musical written by Erin Cressida Wilson, Jack Herrick and Mike Craver. Notably, Portes served as the Associate Director of the Tony Award-winning musical The Who's Tommy, and staged its international productions in Canada, Germany and the U.K., as well as its 20th anniversary remount at the Stratford Festival in 2013.

==== The Glass Menagerie ====
Portes directed a 2017 production of Tennessee Williams’s The Glass Menagerie at California Shakespeare Theater (Cal Shakes) at the Bruns Amphitheater in Orinda, California. Critics praised Portes’s interpretation for its emotional clarity and innovative staging in the outdoor venue. The production was noted for its expressive ensemble and striking visual choices in a challenging open-air setting. Reviewers highlighted the production’s strong performances: the ensemble brought depth to the Wingfield family’s struggles, with particular acclaim for its dramatic intensity and emotional nuance. Critics also observed that Portes’s creative casting and attention to character dynamics made the classic American drama feel immediate and resonant in a contemporary context.

==== Quixote Nuevo ====
Portes directed Quixote Nuevo, a contemporary adaptation of Cervantes’s Don Quixote written by Octavio Solis, as part of the Oregon Shakespeare Festival’s 2025 season. The production received widespread acclaim for its imaginative staging, evocative blending of comedy and pathos, and vibrant cultural texture. Critics described the play as a “feast for the senses” with “energetic and ambitious” elements, praising its evocative use of puppetry, music, and dynamic performances that engaged audiences across emotional and cultural registers. Reviewers also noted the work’s thematic depth, commending its poignant balance of humor and seriousness in addressing aging, memory, and existential quests. Other commentators emphasized the imaginative staging, describing the scenic and costume designs as “spectacular,” and acknowledged Portes’s direction for maintaining narrative clarity amid the play’s kaleidoscopic structure.

==== This is Modern Art ====
The play This is Modern Art was staged at Steppenwolf Theatre. The premise of the play deals with the struggle of graffiti crews, who view their work as art while others see it as vandalism. One night, one crew completes a huge piece which incite backlash from the community as opinions on the validity of graffiti as art are polarized. This play ran from February 25 to March 14, 2015. It sparked controversy in the Chicago area as it presented the graffiti crews in a positive light. One critic at the Chicago Tribune mentioned how the play "is a romantic ode to the art of graffiti and the act of tagging, a piece that demystifies authorial signatures and charts the storied history of graffiti art in Chicago, shouting out its great artists and their canvases, from Kennedy underpasses to CTA train yards... [but] Graffiti comes at a price. It can be invasive, self-important and disrespectful of the property of others — and plenty of struggling folks have had to clean graffiti off something they own or love". Kevin Coval spoke out against the play's criticism stating that "Graffiti operates at the level of metaphor for voices that exist at the margins of culture who have been deliberately excluded or erased from dominate discourse".

==== Ghostwritten ====
Portes directed Naomi Iizuka's Ghostwritten at the Goodman Theatre in April 2009. The play references the war in Vietnam, creating a complex narrative on complicated dual identities of Vietnamese children, the imperialistic nature of the United States and the effects of the war, and invisible yet real geopolitical boundaries between countries and their impacts. The author adds a twist by including themes from the tale Rumpelstiltskin. The play is part of a project that ran at the Goodman Theatre called "Strong Women, Strong Voices" which focused on presenting and supporting work created by women. It had mixed reviews. One critic at the Chicago Maroon thought the play's premise was "so ridiculous that it would border on the comical even if the rest of the play were well-executed".

==== The Who's Tommy ====
The Who's Tommy is based on The Who's 1969 rock album Tommy. The story follows the life of a young boy named Tommy who is not only blind, but deaf as well. He has a very hard childhood, and constantly suffers abuse from his relatives and neighbors. His one salvation is pinball, and it is ultimately his escape when he becomes an international pinball superstar. It has been described as an "exhilarating story of hope, healing and the human spirit". In 2013, the play was remounted at the Stratford Theatre Festival where this "rock opera", one critic mentions, "cranked up the volume for vocal excitement and general rocking-out purposes". Another critic mentions how the musical is also an interesting commentary on "the advances – or not – in disability rights in the post[World War II] era".

==== Wilder: An Erotic Chamber Musical ====
Wilder: An Erotic Chamber Musical ran in the Peter Jay Sharp Theater in New York City from October 14, 2003 to November 14, 2003. The plot follows a growing boy who goes through puberty in a "depression-era bordello". The plot plays with Oedipal themes while the main character reminiscences on his past. The role of the older Wilder Jessup is played by John Cullum. One critic mentioned that having such a popular and skilled lead took away from the other two members of the cast, who were "a little too earnest in their diction and gestures". Another critic mentioned that the play was seemingly an interesting premise but ultimately a "lost cause" with "disappointing music".

== Personal life ==
Portes was born in Madison, Wisconsin. She is the daughter of Cuban-American sociologist Alejandro Portes and Nancy Brazie Kuhnel, an Air Force Brat from Nebraska. When her parents divorced, she moved between U.S. college towns and Latin American cities. She is the oldest of three children. She has one younger brother and one younger sister. Portes was married to playwright Carlos Murillo and lived in Chicago with him and their two children. She now lives in La Jolla.

== Community involvement ==
Portes is one of the founding members of the Latinx Theatre Commons, which was founded in order to encourage the creation and performance of Latinx theater. The group was formed by eight Latina/o theatremakers in May 2012 and was led by Karen Zacarias. The first ever LTC National Convening was held in 2013 at Emerson College in Boston, Massachusetts. The Latina/o Theatre Commons has also created the 2015 carnaval of New Latina/o Works. Portes was in charge of facilitating Latin@'s in Theatre: Building a Movement – Forwarding the Work by Creating Strong Relationships and Allyships at the 2015 Theatre Communications Group National Conference.

== Awards ==
Portes has won Drama League and NEA/TCG Director's Fellowships, Fulbright/Hays Fellowship, and Illinois Theatre Association Outstanding Contribution Award. She has been awarded grants from DePaul University including the University Researcher Grant; the DePaul University Public Service Council Grant, and three DePaul University Quality of Instruction Grants.

Portes received the 2016 Zelda Fichandler Award, which is dedicated to "an outstanding director or choreographer who has transformed the regional arts landscape". Portes is the first freelance director to receive this award.
