= Carlos Murillo =

American playwright, director, and professor

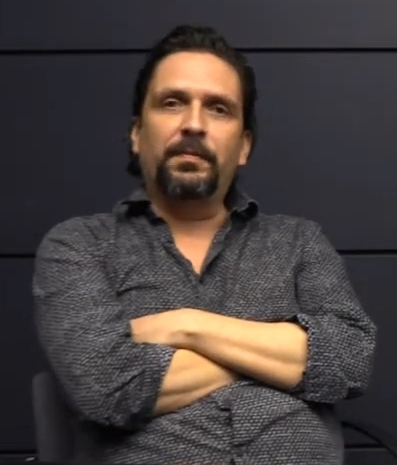
- Murillo in 2018
- Occupations: Playwright, director, professor
- Years active: 1994–present
- Spouse: Lisa Portes
- Children: 2
- Website: Official website

Carlos Murillo is an American playwright, director, and professor of Puerto Rican and Colombian descent. Based in Chicago, Murillo is a professor and head of the Playwriting program at the Theatre School at DePaul University. He is best known for his play Dark Play or Stories for Boys.

== Career ==
Murillo's work has been produced at Repertorio Español, P73, the NYC Summer Playwrights Festival, En Garde Arts, Soho Repertory Theatre, New Dramatists and The Public Theater's New Works Now! Festival in New York City; Goodman Theatre, Steppenwolf Theatre Company's First Look Repertory of New Work, Collaboraction Theatre Company, Adventure Stage Chicago, Walkabout Theater, Theatre Seven, and Chicago Playworks in Chicago; and Boston Court Pasadena Theatre Company, Circle X Theatre, and Son of Semele Ensemble in Los Angeles. He has been commissioned by Oregon Shakespeare Festival, Goodman Theatre, Steppenwolf Theatre Company, Berkeley Repertory Theatre, Playwrights Horizons, The Public Theater, South Coast Repertory, the University of Iowa International Writing Program, and his plays have been developed at the Sundance Theatre Lab, The Playwrights' Center, The Bay Area Playwrights Festival, New Dramatists, the Latinx Theatre Commons Carnaval, and others. Murillo's work has been published by Dramatists Play Service, Broadway Play Publishing, Dramatic Publishing, Smith & Kraus, and Theatre Forum.

In 2017, Murillo directed María Irene Fornés' What of the Night? with Stage Left and Cor Theatre in Chicago as well as the world premiere of Honey Girls by Grace Grindell at The Theatre School of DePaul University, where he also staged works by Sam Shepard, Jason Grote, Nilo Cruz, David Edgar, Ike Holter, and others.

Murillo is an alumnus of New Dramatists. He currently serves on the Board of Directors of MacDowell.

== Plays ==
=== The Javier Plays ===
Published as a collection by 53rd State Press in 2015, The Javier Plays "reconstruct the lost works of forgotten Colombian-American playwright Javier C."

"This book is an absolutely extraordinary achievement from a writer at the height of his powers. Carlos Murillo takes themes hinted at in other works and here develops them into magna opera. Although nominally a play collection, The Javier Plays belongs on the metafiction shelf between Roberto Bolaño's 2666 and David Foster Wallace's Infinite Jest. Quite simply, with this effort Murillo has redrawn the boundaries within which we expect a collection of plays to operate. He disavows linear narrative to create an associative world, and places scenes in one work that are only contextualized in another. The radical nature of Murillo's structural choices fully destabilizes both the reading experience and any assumption an audience might hold regarding the constitution of a play." — Brad Rothbart, American Theatre

Diagram of a Paper Airplane (2009)

The first in The Javier Plays trilogy, Diagram of a Paper Airplane, was commissioned by Goodman Theatre in 2008. Prior to its 2018 premiere at American Theatre Company in Chicago, it received workshops and readings at Goodman Theatre (2008), Sundance Theatre Lab (2009), the William Inge Theatre Festival (2009), The Playwrights Realm (2009), the Kennedy Center Page to Stage Festival (2009), Chicago Dramatists (2011), NNPN National Showcase (2012), New Dramatists (2014), and the Royal Stratford East Playwrights Beyond Borders Festival (2016).

A Thick Description of Harry Smith (2011)

A Thick Description of Harry Smith, a commission for Berkeley Repertory Theatre, is a multi-media "proto-psychedelic medicine show" that explores the life of Harry Everett Smith. Thick Description received workshops at New Dramatists (2009), Collaboraction/Museum of Contemporary Art Chicago (2011), and New Dramatists (2014). It received additional development as part of Murillo's residency at The Watermill Center.

Your Name Will Follow You Home (2015)

Your Name Will Follow You Home, originally commissioned by Steppenwolf Theatre Company, received its world premiere at New York City's Repertorio Español as Spanish language version titled Su Nombre Sera Su Sombra Para Siempre, translated by Caridad Svich. It won the 2013 MetLife Nuestras Voces National Playwriting Competition.

=== Dark Play or Stories for Boys (2007) ===
Dark Play or Stories for Boys received its world premiere at the Humana Festival in 2007, produced by the Actors Theatre of Louisville. The play had its European premiere in Budapest at the Vigszinhaz, and following European productions were staged at Theatre der Stadt Aalen in Germany, Theatre Lubuski in Poland, Andrej Bagar Theatre in Slovakia, and State Youth Theatre in Lithuania.

=== Mimesophobia (or before and after) (2005) ===
Mimesophobia (or before and after) received its world premiere at the Public Theater's New York City Summer Play Festival in 2005 with subsequent productions at Sand and Glass Productions in 2008, and Theatre Seven in 2010.

"Funny, provocative, and poignant, Mimesophobia is a huge success … and one of the more refreshing plays to land this season." — Scotty Zacher, Chicago Theater Beat

== Personal life ==
Murillo studied toward a BFA in acting at Syracuse University but did not complete it. He lives on the South Side of Chicago with his wife, the director Lisa Portes, and their two children.

== Awards and recognition ==
- 2018 Kernodle New Play Award for Killing of a Gentleman Defender
- 2017 American Alliance for Theatre & Education Distinguished Play Award for Augusta and Noble
- 2016 Mellon Foundation Playwright Residency at Adventure Stage in Chicago
- 2015 Doris Duke Impact Award
- 2013 MetLife Nuestras Voces National Playwriting Competition, Winner for Su Nombre Sera Su Sombra Para Siempre
- 2009 Otis L. Guernsey New Voices in the American Theater Award
- 2007 Ofner Prize for Diagram of a Paper Airplane
- 2006 National Latino Playwriting Award for Dark Play or Stories for Boys
- 1996 National Latino Playwriting Award for Never Whistle While You're Pissing
- 1995 Playwrights' Center Jerome Fellowship

== Works ==
=== Full length plays ===
- Subterraneans (1994)
- Near Death Experiences with Leni Riefenstahl (1996)
- Never Whistle While You're Pissing (1998)
- The Patron Saint of the Nameless Dead (1999)
- Schadenfreude (2001)
- Offspring of the Cold War (2002)
- A Human Interest Story or The Gory Details and All (2004)
- Mimesophobia (or before and after) (2005)
- Dark Play or Stories for Boys (2007)
- The Javier Plays
  - Diagram of a Paper Airplane (2009)
  - A Thick Description of Harry Smith (2011)
  - Your Name Will Follow You Home (2015)
- Mayday Mayday Tuesday (2011)
- Augusta and Noble (2013)
- Killing of a Gentleman Defender (2015)
- I Come From Arizona (2018)

=== Short plays ===
- Fragment of a Paper Airplane (2009) – 10 minute play
- Mendacity, or Herd of Elephants in the Room (2012) – 7 minute play
- The Dead Parent Club (2013) – 10 minute play
