= Miriam's Flowers =

Drama play

Miriam's Flowers is a play by Latina playwright Migdalia Cruz, first published in 1990.

The play takes place in New York City’s borough, the Bronx in the 1970s, and details the experiences of the Puerto Rican Nieves family as its members grapple with the death of seven year old Puli Nieves, killed accidentally by a train while attempting to retrieve a baseball from the tracks.

The plot of Miriam’s Flowers does not have a linear structure of progression. As it volleys between the past and present time within the context of the play, Miriam's Flowers juxtaposes cheerful, joy-filled memories involving Puli before his untimely death, with the grim realities faced by his surviving family as they all attempt to cope with his loss. Miriam's Flowers incorporates thematic elements centralizing around religious iconography and martyrdom, as well as the devastating manifestations of grief, touching particularly upon depression, self-harm, and suicide

== Characters ==
- Miriam Nieves – A Puerto Rican girl of 16
- Delfina Nieves – Miriam’s Mother, 36
- Puli Nieves – Miriam’s seven year old brother
- Enrique Rojas – Miriam’s boyfriend, a grocer, 35
- Nando Morales – Delfina’s lover, Puli’s father, 37

== Setting ==
Set in the South Bronx, the duration of the plot of Miriam’s Flowers is described as taking place in the year 1975, from Summer to Winter of that year.

Cruz writes that the set of the play should be dark and simple with the realest elements being the altars, which should be as detailed as possible. With all the candles lit and burning throughout the play, the home altar within the Nieves’ apartment should have a statue of San Martin de Porres, with many candles burning (the choice of color optional); the church altar should have a white plaster “Pieta” and have blue candles burning; the funeral home altar should have simple red candles burning. The bathtub and white coffin should appear within the same place on the stage.

== Synopsis ==
The traumatic effect Puli's death has had upon the Nieves family is immediately made apparent as the play opens to Miriam experiencing a nightmare about her brother's death, and Delfina comforting her. Puli's manner of death and appearance post-mortem drastically affected the mental health of his family, as he died attempting to retrieve a baseball from the train tracks during a game of catch; his body was badly disfigured by the train accident, resulting in his arm being separated from his body as well as other visible traumas. While Delfina denies the truth of Puli's death, Miriam reflects upon her happy memories with her brother, reminiscing about the times they would sing the songs of Puli's favorite band, the Jackson Five, and talk about his impending destiny as the next Puerto Rican baseball star, calling him the future Roberto Clemente.

While Nando imparts the machismo wisdom to Puli's gravestone that he was unable to share during his son's life, he is consumed by depression and grief, and finds himself ostracized from his family despite his repeated attempts to emotionally connect with and provide for them.

In an effort to experience the same pain her little brother did during his death, Miriam cuts herself and engages in rough sex with strange men, often mutilating herself in the process. Enrique, the grocer and Miriam's boyfriend, contributes to Miriam's habit of self-harm by supplying her with razors. Miriam believes that the blood of saints smells like violets, testing out her theory on the statue of San Martin, Jesus’ pieta, and herself. She confides in the virgin Mary that she cuts pictures of flowers into her skin to feel beautiful and alive.

As Delfina's mental health declines, she turns to ritualistically making pigeon soup- the recipe to which she brought over from Puerto Rico and makes as comfort food. Delfina ceases to care for herself, causing Miriam to bathe her. Finally Delfina decides to commit suicide, taking her own life by drowning herself in the tub. Miriam discovers her mother's body, and before the paramedics arrive to take her away, Miriam carves tulips into Delfina's arms with a razor, believing that when Delfina wakes up, she'll be reminded of beauty, renewal, and the impending spring.

== Critical reception and analysis ==
In the wake of its first performance on stage in 1991, Miriam's Flowers received much acclaim from theatre critics, citing Cruz's ability to craft a haunting narrative showcasing gritty realism combined with a fierce sense of compassion. Grimly poetic, the script of this play is described as having a lyrical quality to its charismatic narration, ultimately constructing a poem made from people, where death and life have perilously merged.

Critics of this play write that the disturbing reality of Miriam's Flowers, emphasized by Cruz's personal connection to its setting as the New York borough in which she was raised, translates to the multidimensional pain experienced by its characters as members of a marginalized community of poor, Latino immigrants and their descendants. Analysts of this play conclude that the violence of poverty is demonstrated within Miriam's Flowers through the example of the direct, physically violent manner of Puli's death as a result of a lack of safety precautions within the South Bronx, as well as the metaphorical violence of his surviving family members' lives being pulled apart as a consequence of his loss of life.

== Relevance to Latino theatre and culture ==
The child of Puerto Rican immigrants, playwright Migdalia Cruz self-identifies as a Nuyorican born and raised in the Bronx. Cruz's Latina identity and experiences growing up in the Bronx lends to the realistic nature of Miriam's Flowers, and by imbuing the plot with elements of Latinidad, as well as writing the characters of this play to be Puerto Rican, Migdalia Cruz has created an example of Latino theater centralizing around the experiences and performance of Latino individuals.

Within the plot of Miriam's Flowers, Cruz has fixed thematic elements of Latino identity and culture, contributing to the sense of Latinidad within the piece. The statue upon which Miriam is fixated, San Martin, is a depiction of St. Martin de Porres, a Peruvian-born saint whose father was a Spaniard and mother was an enslaved, indigenous American. San Martin is the patron saint of individuals of mixed race, children, the poor, and the sick, and is especially favored by Hispanic and Caribbean communities. Roberto Clemente, Puli's inspiration and role model, was a Puerto Rican baseball star who advocated for the equitable treatment of Latin baseball players, and whose untimely death foreshadows Puli's. Following Puli's death, Nando exemplifies machismo, imparting unto his son's gravestone the wisdoms pertaining to manhood he was unable to pass on during his son's life, focusing namely upon the concepts of stoicism, bravery, and providing for/defense of women. Cruz also features code-switching within the play, visible especially in Miriam's scenes, where there are recognizable differences between her manner of speech in dialogue with Enrique and her address of the Virgin Mary, as many Puerto Ricans living within New York are able to speak up to five different dialects of Spanish and English.

== Notable production ==
During her time as the Latino Chicago Theatre Company’s writer in residence, Migdalia Cruz’s Miriam’s Flowers debuted for the first time on September 5th, 1991 at the Firehouse Chicago, performed by members of the Latino Chicago Theatre Company. The production was directed by William “Bill” Payne, with costumes and lighting by Michelle Banks, and the set design was completed by Michael Ramirez.

=== Cast ===
- Miriam Nieves – Justina Machado
- Delfina Nieves – Consuelo Allen
- Puli Nieves – Daniel Sanchez
- Enrique Rojas – Felipe Comacho
- Nando Morales – Frankie Davila
