= Diane Rodriguez =

American actress (1951–2020)

Diane Rodriguez (June 22, 1951 – April 10, 2020) was an American theatre artist who directed, wrote and performed. An OBIE Award winning actress, she was known for using comedy to confront various forms of oppression, often with special attention to issues of gender and sexuality.

== History ==
Rodriguez was born and raised in San Jose. Schooled in activist art, she received her B.A. in Theatre Arts from the University of California at Santa Barbara. She was a producer and director at Center Theatre Group, Los Angeles and an Artistic Associate of Cornerstone Theater Company. An enduring influence in Chicano theatre, she was born in the 1950s to American parents from farm working families. She co-founded two theatre companies, El Teatro de la Esperanza (Theatre of Hope) and Latins Anonymous, and was a leading actress for the seminal Chicano theatre group, El Teatro Campesino (Theater of the Farmworkers).

She joined El Teatro Campesino during the mid-1970s. In political sketches for César Chávez and full-length works, she honed her comedic skills performing on a variety of stages from flat bed trucks to ancient European Greco Roman amphi-theatres. In 1988 she co-founded the comedy troupe Latins Anonymous as a response to the Hollywood stereotyping of Latino actors.

Rodriguez then served as director of the Latino Theatre Initiative at the Mark Taper Forum from 1995–2000.

She began directing in 1991 and was awarded a National Endowment for the Arts/Theatre Communications Group Directing Award in 1998. She has directed and developed the work of Nilo Cruz, Lynn Nottage, John Leguizamo, Jose Cruz Gonzalez, John Belluso, Octavio Solis, Culture Clash, Oliver Mayer, Migdalia Cruz and Cherríe Moraga. She received Best Direction nominations for her work on Leguizamo's Spic-O-Rama and Culture Clash's Border Town.

She won an Obie Award in 2007 for playing multiple roles in Heather Woodbury's Tale of Two Cities (Best Ensemble).

In January 2015, it was announced that President Obama nominated Rodriguez to the National Council on the Arts, whose purpose is to advise the chairman of the National Endowment for the Arts on matters of policies and programs.

On April 10, 2020, her employer, Center Theatre Group, announced on Facebook that she had died of lung cancer.

== Published writings ==
- Latins Anonymous Houston: Arte Publico Press University of Houston ISBN 1-55885-172-0
- "Cruising Through Town in a Red Convertible", in anthology Puro Teatro, A Latina Anthology, 2000 Tucson: University of Arizona Press. ISBN 0-8165-1826-2
- "Water" in anthology Crème de la Femme-The Best of Contemporary Women's Humor Saporta, Nancy, editor 1997 ISBN 0-375-70056-0
- The Chicana Files: The Lobos Sightings-Liner Notes; Los Lobos El Cancionero Mas y Mas. 2000 Sire UK & Rhino Entertainment
- "The Pride of the Comunidad: Deeply tied to his culture, Miguel Delgado had a brief career fired by boundless energy. But his friendship was his greatest gift". Los Angeles Times 7 December 1998 sec F. p. 4.
- "A Skeleton In and Out of the Closet". Los Angeles Times, 1 November 1996, sec. F, pp. 1, 20

== Plays ==
- Latins Anonymous co-written with Luisa Leschin, Armando Molina, Rick Najera
- The La La Awards co-written with Cris Franco, Armando Molina, Luisa Leschin
- The Path to Divadom
- Girl With Hair in Her Face
- The Ballad of Ginger Esparza co written with Luis Alfaro
- Los Vecinos/A play for Neighbors co-written with Luis Alfaro
- Water

== Critical studies ==
- Broyles-Gonzalez, Yolanda. El Teatro Campesino Theater in the Chicano Movement. Austin. University of Texas Press 1994 ISBN 0-292-72082-3 Rodriguez, Diane, 45, 128, 137, 141, 156, continued work of 153, 163. on gender issues being ignored 139, not mentioned in history 132. women's early passivity 139 and Zoot Suit 178.
- Broyles-Gonzalez, Yolanda "The Living Legacy of Chicana Performances: Preserving History through Oral Testimony" Frontiers Vol. XI, NO. 1 1990 Frontiers Editorial Collective pgs 46-51.
- Krasner, David Twentieth-Century American Drama. Writing Beyond Borders: US Latina/o Drama. Rodriguez, Diane 379, 383.
- McMahon, Marci R. "Redirecting Chicana/Latina Representation: Diane Rodríguez's Performance and Staging of the Domestic" in Domestic Negotiations: Gender, Nation, and Self-Fashioning in US Mexicana and Chicana Literature and Visual Art. Rutgers University Press, 2013.
- Sandoval- Sanchez, Alberto and Saporta, Sternback, Nancy. Stages of Life: Transcultural Performance and Identity in U.S. Latino Theatre. Tucson: The University of Arizona Press. 2001 Rodriguez, Diane 62; The Path to Divadom 130, 133, 138, 147-48 ISBN 0-8165-1828-9

== Articles ==
- "Rebel's Advocate" by Laura Weinert. Back Stage West June 1, 2000 p. 11
- Alarcon, Alicia, "Diane Rodriguez Has Taken the Chicano Struggle to New Places in Hollywood", La Opinion, 11 December 1989
