= Santos and Santos =

Play by Octavio Solis

Santos and Santos is a crime saga written by Latin playwright Octavio Solis about the Santos Family Law Practice in El Paso during the 1980s. It is loosely based on the killing of Judge John H. Wood Jr. by Jamiel Chagra and his brother that also occurred during the 1980s in El Paso.

Drugs, gambling, and trafficking fuel the law office of Santos & Santos, and the elder brothers are quick to incorporate the younger brother after the recent death of their father. The younger brother, Tomas, questions his relationship to his heritage as he sees his brothers so eagerly trying to live the life of the American. When one of the brothers is tried for murder, Tomas leads an elaborate plot to assassinate the presiding judge in the trial. Consumed by his father's memory, Tomas makes an effort to unite with his brothers and instead pulls them apart; in trying to preserve his father's dreams, he destroys them and in the process brings down a first-generation Chicano family's rise in America. When Tomas says, "Forgive me my Chicanismo", it is a line that reaches out to anyone who has emigrated here, no matter from where or how many generations back. The play explores the Mexican-American struggle to achieve the American dream.

== Character list ==
- Tomas Santos, youngest brother
- Miguel Santos, older brother
- Fernando Santos (Fernie), older brother
- Vicky
- Nena
- Camacho
- Pamela
- Judge Benton
- Gonzalez
- Casper T. Willis
- Peggy Tomlinson-Willis
- Felicia Lee Tomlinson
- Don Miguel, father (voice)

== Plot summary ==
Unfolding over three acts, the play centers on the life of one of three Chicano lawyer brothers initially struggling with maintaining his morals and ethics, and eventually succumbing to the needs of family as well his own desires. The play begins as young Tomas Santos returns to his hometown in El Paso after spending some time working as a San Diego district attorney. He joins his older brothers Miguel and Fernando, who operate a flashy, community-minded private law practice. However, this brief indulgent of Mexican-American swagger is short-lived. Recruited by a federal judge, Tomas becomes an undercover informer tasked with spying on his brothers’ illegal drug trafficking business, foolishly thinking he'll be able to save the family. Repercussions are as immediate as they are violent, misguided and shocking.

As several disasters strike, various loyalties begin to trouble Tomas, making him question his own morals and consequently leading him towards making increasingly destructive decisions. Tomas eventually blows the whistle on his brothers’ corrupt business. He is then faced with the chance of redeeming himself at the cost of committing another horrible act; murdering the presiding judge assigned to his brother's trial. He questions if the betrayal of kin can be excused on a higher moral ground. Solis makes the audience question whether Tomas has been a victim of the racist U.S. judicial system. Santos & Santos presents such dilemmas as a huge gray area.

== Themes and influence ==
The most prominent theme explored in this play is family. Solis submerges his audience into a story revolving around family and the relationship between brothers with conflicting morals. Using the premise of family as a foundation, Solis also exposes his audience to several other thought-provoking themes. The play explores the theme of second-generation Mexican-Americans struggling in an uphill battle in the land of unequal opportunity, and Solis sometimes spells this out using murky dramaturgical strategies while also masterfully utilizing metaphorical language.

The North American Free Trade Agreement (NAFTA) was signed in 1994, roughly a year after the play was first performed. Its influence on Solis is evident throughout several of his works. In “Santos and Santos”, Solis explores this theme of NAFTA being a symbol of increasingly failed opportunity for individuals, echoing the darker side of the false promise of the “American dream” specifically through the Mexican-American perspective.

== Awards and production history ==
At first, Santos and Santos failed to receive any productions even after it was published in the American Theatre magazine, a magazine that likely found its way to the desk of every major artistic director in the country. After much struggle, Solis finally got his play its first unofficial debut in 1993 at the commodious Theater Artaud, otherwise known as The Theatre of Cruelty, as an unfinished work-in-progress. Santos and Santos proved itself to be both impactful and successful as it went on to win two awards shortly after. The same year of its debut, it received The Will Glickman Award for Best New Play in the Bay Area. The following year, it also received The Roger L. Stevens award as well as funding from the Kennedy Center’s Fund for New American Plays. Roughly two years later, in 1995, it had its first official premiere as a fully-realized play at the Dallas Theater Center. It has continued to be produced several times at multiple theaters since its official debut. In 1996 it was performed in Chicago at the Teatro Vista and again the following year at the same theater. In 1997 it was performed in the Maedgen Theatre at Texas Tech University.

One of its most notable productions was in July 1996 under the then recently founded San Francisco company Campo Santo. The company produced and performed Santos and Santos at the small New Langton Arts Theater. With the help of an outstanding cast, the play performed just as well in a minuscule space as it did filling the Artaud's massive, hangar-like theater. The director of this production, Tony Kelly, successfully handled overlapping or quick-changing scenes with grand composure. The set itself consisted of a table, chairs and lighting technician Jim Cave's bold and effective lighting design. Costume designer Sarah Cant brought Solis's characters to life perfectly with her spot-on costumes. Solis used the talent of songwriter Tito Larriva to create music which included magnificent excerpts from composer David Conte’s string-based score used in the play’s original debut in 1993.

== List of (official) productions ==
Production/Theater	Year
Theater Artaud	1993
Thick Description Company	December 1993
The Dallas Theater Center	May 1995
Mixed Blood Theatre Company	January 1996
Teatro Vista	May 1996,1997
Campo Santo/Thick Description	July 1996
University of Washington, Seattle	1997
Texas Tech University, Lubbock	1997
California State University, Monterey Bay	2000
California State University, Sacramento	2002
University of Texas, El Paso	2003
Imua Theatre Company, New York, NY	July 2000
Nushank Theatre Collective, Austin, TX	December 2000
El Centro Su Teatro, Denver, CO	February, 2004
San Pedro Playhouse, San Antonio, TX	December, 2000
Teatro Visíon, San Jose	May 2005
Brown Bag Theater Company, University of California, Irvine	June 2025

== Awards ==
- The Will Glickman Award for Best New Play in the Bay Area, 1993
- The Roger L. Stevens Award: Kennedy Center's Fund for New American Plays, 1994
