= Se Llama Cristina =

Se Llama Cristina is a one-act play by Latino playwright Octavio Solis. A man and woman wake up locked in an apartment with nothing but a crib with a fried chicken leg in it. They have no idea who they are, why they're there, and what their relationship to each other is. They must piece together their past histories to find their identities and construct a future. This poetic play takes you through time and space and feels like a claustrophobic fever dream about the anxieties of parenthood. The play uses elements of magic realism.

This play premiered at San Francisco's Magic Theatre directed by Loretta Greco on January 23, 2014. Its bitter realism combines with a poetic sentimentality has been compared to famed Magic Theatre playwright Sam Shepard.

== Synopsis ==
A man and woman wake up in a California apartment with no memory of who they are or how they got there. All doors are locked and all that is there is a crib with a fried chicken leg in it. Slowly their memories start to reform and the characters gain back their identities. Man had rescued Woman from an abusive relationship after she accidentally calls him instead of a rape-and-abuse counseling service. She becomes pregnant with a baby that may or may not be Man's and is pursued by her former abusive boyfriend, Abel, throughout the years. They revisit the memories that haunt them and eventually rediscover who they are as parents.

=== Characters ===
Man (Mike, Miguel, Miki): male, early 30s, of Mexican descent. One of life's familiar losers. A failed poet, which are all the more self-pitying. He rescued Woman after she dialed the wrong number looking for help out of her abusive relationship. He married her and raised a child with her despite not remembering at the beginning.

Woman (Vespa, Vesta, Vera): female, early 30s, of Mexican descent. This woman has had a rough life. A woman "rode hard and put up wet." She escaped an abusive relationship with Abel and married Man. Her baby may or may not be his.

Abel (Abe, Shadow): male, late 40s. The telephone man. The man every woman adores when he's sweet and loving, but dreads when he's mad. He has traces of the Old West cowboy about him. He follows Woman for many years after she leaves him, convinced that her baby is his.

Girl: female, late teens, of Mexican descent. This character is Cristina, probably the child of Man and Woman. Knows how to handle the difficulties of life and is comfortable facing the dangers of it. Shows up briefly at the end for one monologue.

=== Production history ===
Se Llama Cristina was initially commissioned and developed by the Denver Center Theatre Company. It was further developed at Hartford's Stage's 2012 Brand:NEW Festival.

Its first full production was at San Francisco's Magic Theatre, directed by Loretta Greco in January 2014, where Octavio Solis was the playwright-in-residence.

Other productions happened at the Kitchen Dog Theatre in Dallas, Texas and the Theatre at Boston Court in Pasadena, California.

== General references ==
- SOLIS, O. Se Llama Cristina. Theatre Bay Area. 39, 1, 24-47, Jan. 2014. ISSN 1547-4607.
- Solis O. Plays By Octavio Solis [e-book]. Broadway Play Publishing; 2006. Available from: Play Index (H.W. Wilson), Ipswich, MA. Accessed March 15, 2016.
- HURWITT S. You May Find Yourself. Theatre Bay Area [serial online]. January 2014;39(1):3. Available from: International Bibliography of Theatre & Dance with Full Text, Ipswich, MA. Accessed March 15, 2016.
- Brueckner L, Anderson C. editors' PICKS. Theatre Bay Area [serial online]. January 2013;38(1):6-8. Available from: International Bibliography of Theatre & Dance with Full Text, Ipswich, MA. Accessed March 15, 2016.
- HURWITT S. Who Am I Today?. Theatre Bay Area [serial online]. January 2014;39(1):21-23. Available from: International Bibliography of Theatre & Dance with Full Text, Ipswich, MA. Accessed March 15, 2016.
- "Se Llama Cristina Asks What It Means to Be Latino in America." Village Voice. 2015. Web. 15 Mar. 2016.
- "SOUTHERN CALIFORNIA." Back Stage - National Edition 54.39 (2013): 30-5. ProQuest. Web. 15 Mar. 2016.
- Guterman, Gad. PERFORMANCE, IDENTITY, AND IMMIGRATION LAW: A THEATRE OF UNDOCUMENTEDNESS. Theatre Journal, Volume 67, Number 3, October 2015, pp. 582–583
- HISPANIC-AMERICAN THEATRE. Oxford Companion To American Theatre [serial online]. January 2004;:310-311. Available from: International Bibliography of Theatre & Dance with Full Text, Ipswich, MA. Accessed March 15, 2016.
- Svich C. Re-Mapping Latino Theatre: American Playwrights on the Edge of the Edge. Theatreforum [serial online]. Fall2005 2005;(27):94-96. Available from: International Bibliography of Theatre & Dance with Full Text, Ipswich, MA. Accessed March 15, 2016.
