= Peribáñez y el Comendador de Ocaña =

Play written by Lope de Vega

- Written by: Félix Lope de Vega y Carpio
- Characters: Inés, bridesmaid Costanza, peasant Casilda, bride Peribáñez, groom Bartolo, peasant The Comendador, Don Fadrique; Blas; Marín, lackey Luján, lackey Leonardo, servant King Enrique III; The Queen; The High Constable; A page A secretary Two aldermen of Toledo; Gómez Manrique; A priest Gil; Antón; Benito; Mendo; Llorente; Chaparro; Helipe; Belardo; A painter Musicians; Peasants; Harvesters; A servant Retinue
- Original language: Spanish
- Subject: Honor, Love
- Genre: Spanish Golden Age Drama
- Setting: Ocaña, Spain

Premiere
- Date premiered: unknown/disputed (1604, 1609, 1614)

Peribáñez y el Comendador de Ocaña (Peribáñez and the Comendador of Ocaña) is a Spanish language play by Félix Lope de Vega y Carpio. Published during the reign of Philip III of Spain, it is a tragicomedy about a peasant named Peribáñez, and a Comendador (Spanish article) (knight commander) who falls in love with the former's wife Casilda. Ultimately Peribáñez must kill the Comendador in order to protect his wife from his advances.

== Plot summary ==
=== Act 1 ===
Peribáñez and Casilda are celebrating their wedding when they learn that the Comendador of Ocaña has fallen while trying to control a raging bull. He is brought to their house, and Casilda revives him from unconsciousness. The Comendador immediately falls in love with the beautiful Casilda, and is dismayed to learn that she is already married. Peribáñez and Casilda enjoy their wedded bliss, but the Comendador's obsession with Casilda grows. The married couple decides to travel to Toledo for the Feast Day of the Assumption of Mary, and the Comendador gives them some tapestries to decorate their cart with. He secretly follows them to Toledo, where he pays a painter to sketch a picture of Casilda without her knowing, to be turned into a full-sized portrait later.

=== Act 2 ===
Peribáñez and the other members of the Brotherhood of Saint Roch, the patron saint of Ocaña, meet to discuss the state of disrepair that the icon of the saint has fallen into. It is decided that Peribáñez should return to Toledo to commission an artist to repair it. The Comendador conspires with his assistants, Luján and Leonardo, to find ways to seduce Casilda. Luján tells the Comendador that the tapestries he gave the couple are hanging in their bedroom, which the Comendador takes as a sign of encouragement. Luján decides to try and seduce Casilda's unwed cousin Inés to get closer to Casilda. While Peribáñez is in Toledo, various harvesters who work for him stay at his house. Luján pretends to be one, and lets the Comendador into the house. The Comendador attempts to seduce Casilda, but she loves and is loyal to Peribáñez and rejects him.

Meanwhile, Peribáñez visits the same artist who the Comendador had ordered the portrait from and commissions him to repair the icon of Saint Roch. The painter shows him the portrait he is working on, and Peribáñez recognizes his wife. The painter assures him that the woman in the picture had no idea about the portrait, and tells him who commissioned the work. Peribáñez is overcome with jealousy. When he returns to Ocaña he learns from some of the harvesters about what happened at his house while he was gone, and is glad to hear of Casilda's innocence. When he returns to his house he makes up a story about falling from his horse but being protected by Saint Roch. He claims that he wishes to give the tapestries as an offering of thanks, so that he can remove them from the bedroom, as they now remind him of the man who is lusting after his wife. Luján arrives and tells Peribáñez that he has been summoned by the Comendador.

=== Act 3 ===
The Comendador and Leonardo discuss his latest plan: The king, Enrique III, has called forces to battle against the Moors, and the Comendador will appoint Peribáñez Captain of the peasant forces, so that he will go off to fight in the war, leaving the Comendador free to seduce Casilda. Peribáñez arrives and approaches the Comendador, asking him to knight him so that he may fight with honor. The Comendador obliges, unwittingly elevating the peasant to his own level and giving him the right to do battle with him. The women give tokens to the men going off to battle, and Casilda gives her husband a black ribbon, which he protests is a bad omen. The men leave for war, and Leonardo meets with Inés to make arrangements for her to let the Comendador into Casilda's house later. Leonardo tries to caution the Comendador about what he plans to do, but he is ignored. His attendants then fetch him a cape: black, like the ribbon given to Peribáñez and similarly interpreted. The attendants explain that his custom of wearing brightly colored cloaks is well known and that wearing a black one will allow him to go unrecognized, but he demands a colored one.

Meanwhile, Peribáñez secretly returns, having doubled back from leading his troops, and walks down the street to his house, soliloquizing about the delicate nature of honor. He sneaks into his house, hiding in a pantry, where he gets covered in flour. The Comendador enters the house with the help of Inés, and comes on to Casilda. She is dismayed to find herself betrayed by her cousin, and continues to resist the Comendador's advances. He orders Inés and his men to leave so that he can try to rape her. Peribáñez bursts from the pantry where he is hiding and mortally wounds the Comendador. Leonardo finds him, repentant for his actions and asking for a priest so that last rites can be performed.

When the king hears of the death of one of his favored Comendadors by a mere peasant, he is enraged, but his wife, the Queen, councils him to hear Peribáñez' side of the story. Peribáñez humbles himself before the king and explains what happened. The king pardons him and grants him the title of Captain, the reward money posted for the capture of himself and his wife, and the right to bear arms. The queen gives Casilda four dresses from her own wardrobe.
