= Georgina Escobar =

Mexican-American playwright

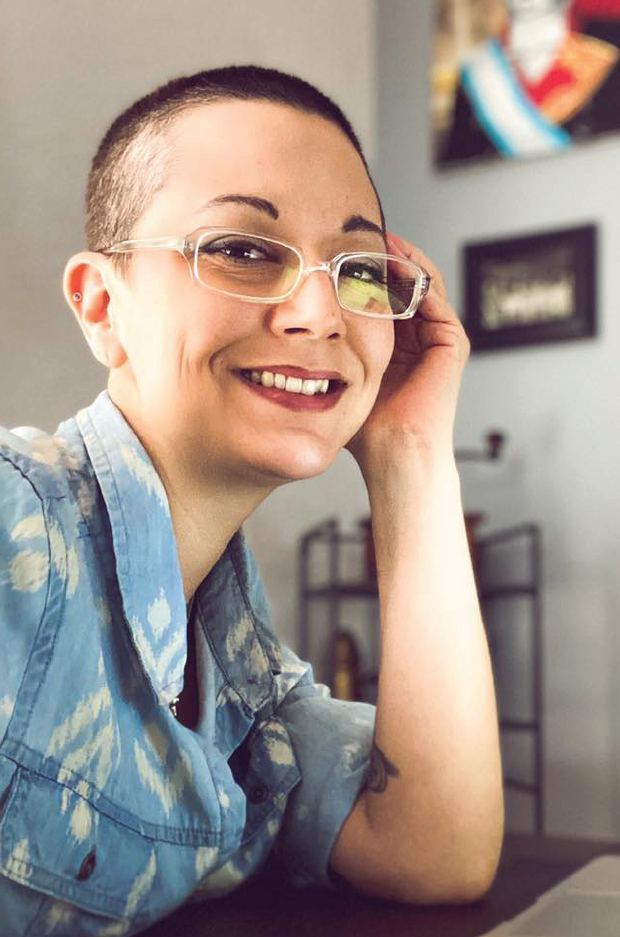
- Born: Ciudad Juárez, Chihuahua, México
- Citizenship: Mexico and United States
- Occupation: ● Playwright ● librettist ● director ● educator
- Writing career
- Language: Spanish, English
- Years active: 2003 - present
- Notable works: Then They Forgot About the Rest; Sweep; Desaparecidas; Little Duende
- Notable awards: ● The Kennedy Center's National Daryl Ayers Award ● Kilroy's List 2019 ● Variety Gotham Audio Award

Georgina Escobar is a Mexican and international playwright, librettist, director and arts educator. Her plays explore themes of fantasy, mythology, feminism and the breakdown of the family, including science-fiction ("sci-femme") narratives, musicals, and "frontera-futurity" stories set on the U.S.–Mexico border.

She is a MacDowell Fellow, a Djerassi artist, a member of the María Irene Fornés and Clubbed Thumb writing groups, and a La MaMa Umbria playwright. She is a recipient of the Kennedy Center's Darrell Ayers Playwriting Award and the Outstanding Service to Women on the Border Award. Her work has been published in The Texas Review, Los Bárbaros, Routledge, McSweeney's Press ("I Know What's Best For You"), Climate Change Theatre Action's Lighting the Way, New Passport Press, and Inti Press (UK).

Her plays have been produced across the USA and internationally in México, UK, Italy, Denmark, and Sweden. Off-Broadway, her play Then They Forgot About the Rest premiered at INTAR Theatre in 2019. As an arts educator she has taught at Kingsborough College NY, University of Texas El Paso, Princeton University and Dartmouth College.

== Early life and education ==
Escobar was born in Ciudad Juárez, Chihuahua, Mexico. Despite growing up in a community in Mexico that Escobar describes as a "machismo community of cattle ranchers and mine owners", she says the respect for women and the power they held within her family dynamic was very strong.

She has lived in many places throughout her life, including Chihuahua City, Chihuahua; Zacatecas City, Zacatecas; San Diego, California; El Paso, Texas; Albuquerque, New Mexico; and New York City.

After graduating from the University of Texas at El Paso in 2006 with a degree in humanities and philosophy, Escobar began her career as a performer and studied acting at the Stella Adler Studio of Acting in New York City. Escobar went on to receive an MFA in dramatic writing at the University of New Mexico in Albuquerque in 2011.

== Career ==
=== Theatre ===
Escobar has been involved with the Latinx Theatre Commons (LTC) throughout her career in multiple ways, from having a staged reading of her play Sweep at a festival in 2015 alongside the works of other Latinx playwrights, to serving as the managing editor for the LTC online publication Café Onda, to acting as a steering committee member for the LTC from 2013.

Aside from acting and writing, Escobar has also worked as a director, an educator and translator. Notable directing work includes Adamandi at the Berlind Theatre at McCarter Theatre Center in Princeton, The Music of La Casa Azul with the Carmel Symphony Orchestra at The Palladium at the Center for The Performing Arts, Alebrijes at ArtVallarta in Puerto Vallarta, and País de Bicicleta at Aurora Theatre.

She also does community-based youth outreach in the form of artistic workshops with grade-school students. In April 2017, she participated in a playwriting workshop with students from a school district in Marfa, Texas, a small community in West Texas not far from her birthplace in Ciudad Juárez.

Escobar's plays have been developed and produced at theaters including INTAR, Dixon Place, The Flea Theater, Lincoln Center, the Eugene O'Neill Theater Center, Clubbed Thumb, the Bushwick Starr, Two Rivers Theater, Milagro, the Aurora Theatre and Duke City Repertory Theatre.

Her play Then They Forgot About the Rest, a "southwest femmetasia" about an advertising agency hired to market a memory-erasing drug, received its world premiere Off-Broadway at INTAR Theatre in 2019, in a production directed by David Mendizábal and co-produced with the Radio Drama Network. Her play StoneHeart, a "deconstructed Western" set in Ciudad Juárez, was named to The Kilroys List in 2019 and was a finalist for the O'Neill Center's National Playwrights Conference in 2019 and 2025.

==== Ash Tree ====
Ash Tree follows the story of three sisters in the aftermath of the loss of their mother. Escobar experienced the loss of her own mother before the idea for the play came to her in a dream. The plot has its basis in themes relating to fantasy and mythology.

The play had its initial readings in Indiana in 2010, at the ASSITEJ Festival in Denmark and Sweden in 2010, and at the Kahootz Theatre in 2009. In 2011, it was workshopped by Fourth Wall Productions, a company that Escobar founded in 2003. Ash Tree premiered at New Mexico's Duke City Repertory Theatre in 2012 and was produced by Capital High School Theatre in Santa Fe, New Mexico, in 2016.

==== The Ruin ====
The Ruin explores themes of magic, witchcraft, mystery and ancient legends. Like Ash Tree, Escobar has said she was inspired to write the story after the idea came to her in a dream. It was staged in 2011 by the Manhattan Repertory Theatre and at the Words Afire Theatre Festival in New Mexico.

==== The Unbearable Likeness of Jo, Semity, & Jones ====
The Unbearable Likeness of Jo, Semity, & Jones is described as an investigation into memory, personal identity and digiphrenia, in which a character named Jones deconstructs memory in the moments before her plane crashes. The play was read at Coffee and Whiskey Productions in Chicago in 2014, at The Flea Theater in New York City in 2015, and at the Movement Theatre Company in New York City in 2016. It had a workshop production at Dixon Place in 2015.

==== Sweep ====
Sweep is described as a feminist play. The story follows two siblings who have the ability to travel through time. Much of the story concerns biblical figures such as Adam and Eve, which Escobar attributes in part to her upbringing; she attended Catholic school and explored spirituality alongside her family members. The play follows two sisters and "hit women of the splintered worlds" whose initial encounter with Adam and Eve catches up with them lifetimes later, as they hunt their targets from biblical times to the modern day in an attempt to reset humanity's patterns.

Sweep had readings at the Brooklyn Generator in New York City in 2014 and at the Latinx Theatre Commons Carnaval of New Latina/o Work in Chicago in 2015. It was also workshopped at the Lincoln Center Theater's Director's Lab in 2016. The play was a finalist for the National Latino Playwriting Award and was produced in 2017 at the Aurora Theatre in Atlanta, Georgia.

==== The Circuz ====
The Circuz is a political satire and melodrama. Set in Ciudad Juárez at the height of violence in the city, the narrative is a "macabre farce that explores the discomfort of violence through exaggeration, faith through senses, and the cynicism of a land divided in two".

==== Monsters We Create and Migrant X ====
As a visiting professor and playwright-in-residence at the University of Texas at El Paso, Escobar led a group of students in devising Monsters We Create, a collaboratively developed play that premiered in February 2020 and dealt with themes of political chaos, climate change and resilience.

She also co-created Migrant X with University of North Carolina at Charlotte theatre professor Carlos-Alexis Cruz; described as the first Latinx play produced at that university, it drew on the activism of Charlotte baker and immigrant-rights advocate Manolo Betancur.

==== Musical theatre ====
As a librettist, Escobar wrote the book and lyrics (with composer Robi Hager) for Little Duende, a dark fairy-tale musical about a young duende who journeys north after her mother is abducted; the work was developed through the National Alliance for Musical Theatre (NAMT) and the O'Neill Center's National Music Theater Conference.

She wrote the book for Desaparecidas, a musical inspired by the disappeared women of the borderlands and staged as a Mexican palenque (state fair) narrated by the late singer Jenni Rivera; with music by Jaime Lozano and lyrics by Lozano and Florencia Cuenca, it had an Off-Off-Broadway run at JACK in Brooklyn in 2022. She also wrote the book and lyrics (with composer Zenén Zeferino Huervo) for the youth musical All Strings Considered (also presented as Zoongoro Bailongo).

She is the lead bookwriter for The Vinyl Cafe Christmas Musical, a family holiday musical based on the stories of Canadian broadcaster Stuart McLean, with Jess Milton; and with songs by Colleen Dauncey and Akiva Romer-Segal, it received its world premiere at Edmonton's Citadel Theatre in November 2025 and will premiere in Ottowa's National Arts Centre's 2026-2027 Season She is also developing We Belong Together (also referred to as Ritchie), a musical built around the catalogue of Ritchie Valens.

==== Film and audio ====
Escobar's short film MONAH premiered at the Austin Film Festival in 2022 and screened at festivals including the Brooklyn Sci-Fi Film Festival and the El Paso Plaza Classic Film Festival.

In audio, her short fiction has been featured on the Girl Tales podcast ("Musings") and on the Talking While Female album for Audible ("And Then I Hit the Glass"); the latter received the inaugural Gotham & Variety Audio Honors Award for audio storytelling.

==== Teaching ====
As an arts educator, Escobar has taught at Kingsborough Community College in New York, the University of Texas at El Paso, Princeton University and Dartmouth College, where she has taught musical theatre writing with a focus on collaborative creation and speculative playwriting.

==== Themes and style ====
Escobar's works include themes of fantasy, surrealism, feminism, family relationships, and modern twists on traditional mythology, among others. She notes that her female family members served as inspiration for many of the strong female characters in her plays, especially because of the fantastical discussions she often engaged in with the women of her family.

She cites ancient philosophers as well as writers such as Isabel Allende, Ursula Le Guin, Jorge Luis Borges, Lewis Carroll, Kurt Vonnegut, and Christopher Moore as inspirational figures.

== Selected works ==
=== Plays ===
- Then They Forgot About the Rest
- StoneHeart
- Penny Pinball Presents: The Beacons
- Species: Human
- Monsters We Create (in collaboration with UTEP Playwrights)
- Migrant X (with Carlos-Alexis Cruz)
- B.I. (Be)
- Screwgar
- Quixote: On the Conquest of Self (translation)
- Alebrijes
- Posdata: or what I wish I said
- Death and the Tramp
- Sweep
- The Unbearable Likeness of Jo, Semity, & Jones
- The Wayfoot Series
- Ash Tree
- The Ruin
- The Circuz

=== Musicals ===
- Little Duende (book and lyrics; music by Robi Hager)
- Desaparecidas (book; music by Jaime Lozano)
- All Strings Considered / Zoongoro Bailongo (book and lyrics; music by Zenén Zeferino Huervo)
- Frida (book)
- Vinyl Cafe: The Musical (book, with Jess Milton)
- We Belong Together / Ritchie (book and lyrics)
- Firerock the Musical

=== Film and audio ===
- MONAH (short film)
- "And Then I Hit the Glass" (Talking While Female, Audible)
- "Musings" (Girl Tales podcast)

== Awards and honors ==
- Kennedy Center Theater for Young Audiences (Darrell Ayers) Playwriting Award, 2010
- Outstanding Service to Women on the Border Award, 2004
- National Latino Playwriting Award finalist (Sweep)
- The Kilroys List, 2019 (StoneHeart)
- O'Neill National Playwrights Conference finalist, 2019 and 2025 (StoneHeart)
- Gotham & Variety Audio Honors Award, inaugural recipient ("Musings")
- Fellowships and residencies at MacDowell, Djerassi, Rhinebeck, La MaMa Umbria and the Fornés Writing Workshop^{[3]}
- Dramatists Guild Foundation National Fellow (Musical Theater), 2026

== Personal life ==
Escobar identifies as bisexual and as a queer Mexican writer. Spanish is her first language, and she has said that her "true self lives" in the writing of her native language. Besides writing, Escobar has expressed her love for the outdoors and for the visual arts, saying that she often paints.

She has served on the boards of the El Paso Holocaust Museum and Marfa Live Arts, and on the advisory committees of the Latinx Theatre Commons and the Climate Commons for Theatre and Performance.

Reflecting on her identity as a Jewish Latina playwright, Escobar has pushed back against the idea that Latinx playwrights must have some specifically Latinx quality to their work, stating: "As an artist and writer, all of my work was, is and will always be Mexican because that is what I am... Personally, I am more interested in being an artist than in defining my art."
