= Milta Ortiz =

American dramatist

Milta Ortiz is a bilingual, bicultural playwright, poet, and performer.

== Background ==
Born in El Salvador, Ortiz emigrated to the United States during childhood and settled with her family in Northern California. She earned her MFA from Northwestern University's Writing for the Screen & Stage program and a Creative Writing BA from San Francisco State University. Ortiz has taught creative writing to young adults and screenwriting to undergraduates at Northwestern University in Evanston, Illinois. In addition, she has taught theatre at Pima Community College. While continuing to write plays, Ortiz is a board member for National New Play Network. She is the Associate Artistic Director at Borderlands Theater in Tucson, AZ.

== Career ==
=== Works ===
- Más (Produced by Borderlands Theater Company, 2015). The play explores themes of identity, history, and humanity as a result of House Bill 2281 which banned Ethnic studies within classrooms in Tucson, Arizona. Más is based on a true story, and the dialogues and situations included in the play were taken from actual interviews, writings, and court documents.
- Disengaged (Commissioned and produced by Rising Youth Theater, 2014)
- You, Me, and Tuno (Produced by Teatro Luna, 2013). The play focuses on the dangers of food deserts and the effects it has on minority communities, as Ortiz stated:
  "Good food should not be for a select few. It should be affordable and accessible to all. It’s food justice. I’m very interested in that. Food is making us sick. So many Latinos and African Americans have diabetes and at younger and younger ages".
- Fleeing Blue (Staged at Wichita State University, 2012)
- Packaged Love (Multi-media performance art piece, Greenhouse Theater Center, 2012; The Garage at Steppenwolf Theatre Company, 2011)
- Last of the Lilacs (Staged reading at Repertorio Español, 2011)
- Portrait of a Star (Multi-media performance art piece, Teatro Luna's Noche Bohemia, 2011)
- Union Street (Performed at Northwestern University's 10-minute Play Festival, 2010)
- Scatter My Red Underwear [Workshop productions at Mission Cultural Center in San Francisco, CA (2008), La Peña in Berkeley, CA (2007), and Malonga Arts in Oakland, CA (2007)]
- La Princesa Blanca (SOMArts Theater, 2006)

=== Publications ===
Ortiz has been published in City of Stairways: A Poet's Field Guide to San Francisco), Teaching Artist Journal, and has created a self-published chapbook, Encantadas with Las Manas Tres. Mirrors, written by Ortiz and published by the Teaching Artist Journal in 2011, explores what it was like for Ortiz to go from learning English just six months after emigrating to the United States at eight-years-old, to then go on to teach English as a second language to recently arrived immigrants. As Ortiz stated:

"I had to go back to that place, that feeling of being new and inside out, I had moved so far away from. Every class was a learning experience for me. Every class triggered a different memory".

=== Nominations ===
- Claire Rosen and Samuel Edes Foundation Prize for Emerging Artists, 2013
- Post graduate fellow in Writing for Performance at Colorado College, 2012

=== Awards ===
- 2006-2009: Ortiz received the following Individual Artist Grants: two from Oakland, California's Cultural Funding Program; one from the Zellerbach Family Foundation to "write and perform her solo work while in the Bay Area
- 2011: Last of the Lilac Roses was a finalist at Repertorio Español's Nuestras Voces playwriting contest.
- 2012: Fleeing Blue won the Wichita State University playwriting contest.
- 2013: Ortiz was a finalist in Downtown Urban Arts Festival (New York City) for her work You, Me, and Tuno. The play was thereafter staged at Teatro Luna, Chicago's All-Latina Theater Company. During the same year, Ortiz became the National New Play Network resident playwright at Borderlands Theater Company.

== Personal life ==
Milta Ortiz is mother to a creative daughter. She currently lives in Tucson, Arizona and is the Marketing and Outreach Director for Borderlands Theatre Company. Her husband is Marc David Pinate, the Producing Artistic Director at Borderlands. They co-founded the Hybrid Performance Experience (HyPE), which is a theater troupe that performs at public spaces throughout California's Bay Area.
