= Marisela Treviño Orta =

American dramatist

- Education: Southwestern University (BA); University of San Francisco (MFA); University of Iowa (MFA)

Marisela Treviño Orta is a third-generation Mexican-American playwright and poet from Lockhart, Texas. She attended the University of San Francisco where she received an MFA in Writing. While she was trained in poetry, Treviño Orta began writing plays after becoming the resident poet for El Teatro Jornalero!, a Latino theatre company which focuses on social justice issues.

== Career ==
Marisela Treviño Orta was first attracted to theatre and playwriting during her time as the resident poet at El Teatro Jornalero!. She was attracted to the theatre community, as she found poetry was often a lonely craft. Additionally, she found it was easier to explore political and social justice themes in playwriting, which she could not do in her poetry.

The playwright found immediate success with her first play Braided Sorrow, which won the 2006 Chicano/Latino Literary Prize in Drama, and the 2009 Pen Center USA Literary Award in Drama. This play was accepted into the 2005 Bay Area Playwrights Festival and officially premiered at Su Teatro in Denver, CO. Since then, she has written other successful plays including Heart Shaped Nebula (2012 O’Neill Playwrights Conference Semi-Finalist, 2013 Aurora Theatre Global Age Project Finalist), American Triage (2012 MetLife Nuestras Voces National Playwriting Runner-Up), which was a commissioned by Marin Theatre Company, and Woman on Fire, which was commissioned by the Latino Playwrights Initiative. Treviño Orta was awarded the 2013 National Latino Playwriting Award for The River Bride, and most recently was a 2018/2019 Kendeda Finalist (Alliance Theatre) for Shoe. She is a 2011 alumna of the Playwright Foundation's Resident Playwright's Initiative and a graduate of the University of Iowa’s Playwrights Workshop.

Most recently, Treviño Orta authored a trilogy of plays inspired by Latinx mythology and the Brothers Grimm fairy tales. The River Bride, the first of the three, is set in Brazil and is inspired by Amazonian folklore and premiered February 21, 2016 at the Oregon Shakespeare Festival. The second, Wolf at the Door, which is currently featured in National New Play Network's Rolling World Premieres program, is set in Mexico and focuses on Mesoamerican belief. Alcira, the trilogy's conclusion, is set in San Francisco and based on Aztec mythology.

== Involvement in the theatre community ==
Treviño Orta is currently a member of the Dramatists Guild, the Latinx Theatre Commons, and is a founding member of the Bay Area Latino Theatre Artists Network.

== Works ==
- Braided Sorrow
- Heart Shaped Nebula
- The River Bride
- American Triage
- Woman on Fire
- Wolf at the Door
- Alcira
- Ghost Limb
- Somewhere

== Awards and recognition ==
Year	Award	Category	Work	Result
2006	Chicano/a Literary Prize	Drama	Braided Sorrow	Won
2009	Pen Center USA Literary Award	Drama	Braided Sorrow	Won
2012	Repertorio Español MetLife Nuestras Voces National Playwriting Competition	N/A	American Triage	Runner-up
2012	O'Neill Playwrights Conference	N/A	Heart Shaped Nebula	Semi-finalist
2013	Aurora Theatre Global Age Project	N/A	Heart Shaped Nebula	Finalist
2013	National Latino Playwriting Award	N/A	The River Bride	
2017	50 Playwrights Project's Best Unproduced Latin@ Plays 2017	N/A	Wolf at the Door	Finalist
