= Mando Alvarado =

American dramatist

- Born: Pharr, Texas
- Education: University of North Carolina School of the Arts
- Occupations: Playwright, screenwriter, actor

Mando Alvarado is an American playwright, screenwriter and actor originally from Pharr, Texas. At age nine, his father died. He grew up with two younger brothers and describes himself as a bully towards them in their younger years. He first got involved with theater in middle school, when his Drama teacher told him he would need to take a role in a production to pass the class. Alvarado's first play-writing experience was a monologue inspired by Luis Valdez's Zoot Suit, particularly Edward James Olmos' character El Pachuco. His first full-length play was written after he first moved to New York City, while he worked a temp-job in Midtown. After a reading with Raúl Castillo in a Lower East Side bar, Alvarado decided focus his career on writing.

== Education and career ==
=== Theater ===
Alvarado is a graduate of the University of North Carolina School of the Arts, as well as a member of Rising Phoenix Rep, alum of INTAR's Hispanic-Playwright-in-Residence Laboratory 2006 – 2008 and a member of Company of Angels writer's group. During his residency, Alvarado wrote two plays, both of which premiered off-Broadway: Post No Bills, which premiered at the Rattlestick Playwrights Theater in 2009 and Basilica which premiered at the Cherry Lane Theater in 2013. In between these two works, Alvarado's play Sangre premiered in 2011 at NYC Summerstages. In 2015, Alvarado premiered Parachute Men at the Latina/o Theatre Commons' Carnaval of New Latina/o Work, which was hosted by The Theatre School at DePaul University. He described Parachute Men as something "really personal" to him, written about himself and his brothers and "'a kind of asking for forgiveness' play that deals with manhood and the lack of motherly love." Although the play was inspired by his own history, Alvarado felt his characters needed to, "live and breathe on their own," not reflect the personalities of himself or his brothers. While Alvarado considers himself Mexican-American, he does not see his work as addressing Mexican American or Chicano issues. Instead, he sees his writing as addressing family issues and believes that his work, in a vacuum, speaks to the American experience broadly.

=== Film and television ===
Alvarado has also worked in film and television, appearing in shows such as Law and Order, The Sopranos and Nurse Jackie. Additionally, he has written for FX's series Tyrant, receiving credit for the teleplay of Season 2 episode Desert Storm. His 2009 film Cruzando, which he co-wrote, directed, produced and starred in, was screened at the HBO New York International Latino Film Festival, Newport Beach International Film Festival, and London Latino International Film Festival. Further, Cruzando was awarded at the Mexican International Film Festival, San Antonio Film Festival and Seattle True Independent Film Festival. Cruzando is the story of 26 year old Manny, a resident of Monterrey, Mexico and father to be, who embarks on a journey to see his father for the last time before he is to be executed in Texas.

== Personal life ==
Alvarado is a father and currently lives in Los Angeles. Although writing has taken a backseat to parenting, he tries to write at least an hour a day.
