= Milcha Sanchez-Scott =

American dramatist

Milcha Sanchez-Scott (born 1953) is an American playwright of Indonesian, Chinese, Dutch, and Colombian heritage. She spent her early years in Colombia, Mexico, and London, attended Catholic school in La Jolla, California, and graduated from the University of San Diego, where she studied literature, philosophy, and theatre.

When Sanchez-Scott moved to Los Angeles to pursue an acting career, she was discouraged by the paucity of roles portraying Hispanics and became a playwright. Her first play, Latina (1980), was based on her experiences working as a receptionist in a maids' agency in Beverly Hills. Sanchez-Scott's most produced play to date is Roosters (1987). In this work, the cast explores relationships in a rural Southwestern household through a style of magical realism infused with heightened language – a poetic interpretation of the way working-class Chicanos speak. Roosters has been produced by professional theaters as well as by colleges, universities, and community-based Hispanic theater companies.
