= HowlRound =

HowlRound Theatre Commons
- Available in: English
- Owner: Emerson College
- Creators: P. Carl, David Dower, Jamie Gahlon, and Vijay Mathew
- Website: howlround.com
- Commercial: No
- Launched: 2011; 15 years ago

HowlRound Theatre Commons is a non-profit service organization based out of Emerson College's Office of the Arts. Its aim is to support developing theatre practitioners and facilitating dialogue within not-for-profit theatre and performance arts field. Theatre Commons' platforms use commons-based peer production as their content methodology.

== Projects ==
HowlRound's projects include an online Journal, a livestreaming TV channel, and the World Theatre Map. HowlRound also produces in-person convenings. In 2013, the Andrew W. Mellon Foundation and HowlRound began a National Playwright Residency Program.

== History ==
HowlRound first started as an online journal launched in 2011, created by P. Carl, David Dower, Jamie Gahlon, and Vijay Mathew as part of the American Voices New Play Institute (AVNPI). The concept for HowlRound evolved out of work and research performed in 2005 and 2006 and the writings of David Dower's "The Gates of Opportunity" and Todd London and Ben Pesner's Outrageous Fortune, both of which examined the lack of institutional support and resources in the non-profit theatre community. In December 2011 it was decided that all of the documentation and dissemination work of the AVNPI would move to Emerson College in Boston. This included the HowlRound journal, the livestreaming television channel then called NewPlay TV (now HowlRound TV), the New Play Map, and all of the convening activity. At the time of the move, it was decided that the entirety of the work would come under the name "HowlRound" and that the remaining parts of AVNPI would remain at Arena Stage. In July 2012, HowlRound officially began operations at Emerson College.
