= Octavio Solis =

American playwright and director (born 1958)

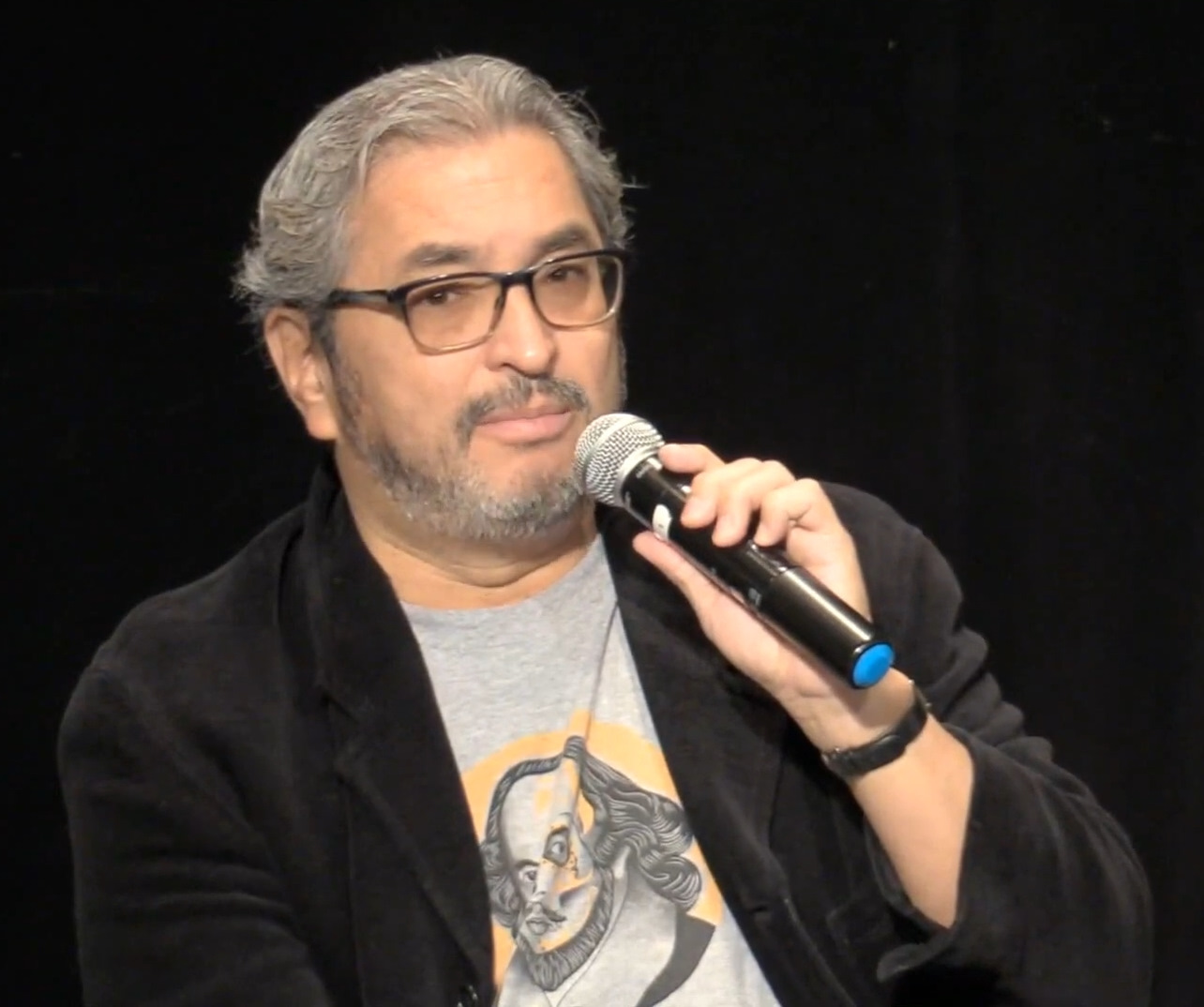
- Octavio Solis at the Oregon Shakespeare Festival, September 2019
- Born: 1958 (age 67–68); El Paso, Texas, U.S.
- Education: Trinity University (BFA); Trinity University (at Dallas Theatre Centre) (MFA)
- Occupations: Playwright and director
- Spouse: Jeanne Sexton

Octavio Solis (born 1958) is an American playwright and director whose plays have been produced at theaters and small companies across the United States. He has written over 25 plays, including his most famous works: Lydia, Santos & Santos and Man of the Flesh. His works have earned numerous awards and grants.

== Life and career ==
Born in El Paso, Texas, to Mexican parents, Solis started his career in theater by joining his high school, Riverside High School's (El Paso, TX) theater group when he was fourteen. He received a BFA at Trinity University and went on to earn his MFA at Trinity University's off-campus program at the Dallas Theatre Center. After college, while acting in Eric Overmyer's Native Speech in Dallas, Solis was inspired to write his own plays rather than act in them. In between acting and writing, he taught high school students at Booker T. Washington School for the Performing and Visual Arts. He moved to San Francisco in 1989 to further his career, as he felt he was "hitting a glass ceiling" in Dallas, and felt that California would be a good place to participate in the "Mexican American experience".

Solis uses his experiences in life to help create and shape his plays, often drawing directly from his time in El Paso, where he states that he was able to see both the first-world and the third-world from his backyard. In his play Lydia, which focuses on a working-class Mexican-American family and an undocumented maid who arrives in the broken home, he draws upon his own experiences as a Latino living only a mile from the Rio Grande.

Solis was a "cultural consultant" for the Disney film Coco. He voices an Arrival Agent in the film and its spinoff short.

== Contributions to Latino Theatre ==
Octavio Solis has made a large number of contributions to the Latino Theatre community, namely in the number of works he has created that are designed to be for and played by Latino/as. One of his most critically acclaimed works, Lydia, focuses on a Latino family and their maid who recently came from Mexico to work in the states. His importance in the Latino/a community have been widely recognized, as evident by his numerous awards such as his National Latino Playwriting Award and his being awarded the Henry Award for Outstanding New Play. He has also received a number of grants and funds, including the New Works Fund Grant from the Theatre Bay Area and the Kennedy Center Fund for New American Plays.

== Awards ==
| Award | Dates |
|---|---|
| Barri and BC Stavis Playwriting Award, National Theatre Conference | 1992-93 |
| Lila Wallace/Reader's Digest Fund: Writers for Young Audiences (for La Posada Magica) | 1992-93 |
| The Will Glickman Award for Best New Play in the Bay Area (for Santos & Santos) | 1993 |
| The Roger L. Stevens Award: Kennedy Center's Fund for New American Plays (for Santos & Santos) | 1994 |
| Kennedy Center Fund for New American Plays (for Dreamlandia) | 1997-98 |
| Playwriting Fellowship from the National Endowment for the Arts | 1995-97 |
| McKnight Fellowship: The Playwrights' Center | 1998-99 |
| TCG/NEA Theatre Artists in Residence Grant, Dallas Theater Center | 1998–2000 |
| National Theatre Artists Residency Program, Pew Charitable Trusts | 2000-02 |
| TCG/NEA Theatre Artists in Residence Grant, Shadowlight Productions | 2000-01 |
| National Latino Playwriting Award: Arizona Theatre Center | 2002 |
| Creative Work Fund, Campo Santo, Intersection for the Arts | 2002-03 |
| New Works Fund Grant, Theatre Bay Area | 2006-07 |
| Thornton Wilder Fellow, MacDowell Colony | 2008 |
| Denver Post Ovation Award, Best Production (for Lydia) | 2008 |
| Henry Award, Outstanding New Play (for Lydia) | 2008 |
| Bay Area Critics Circle Mid-Career Achievement Award | 2010 |
| United States Artists Fellowship | 2011 |
| Pen Center Award for Drama (For Se Llama Cristana) | 2014 |
| Distinguished Achievement in the American Theater Award by the William Inge Center for the Arts | 2019 |

== Works ==
| Production | Theaters | Dates |
|---|---|---|
| Impatiens | Intersection for the Arts, SF, CA | Aug 1990 |
| Scrappers | South Coast Repertory, CA; Teatro Milwaukee, WI | Fall 1992-93; May 1995 |
| Man of the Flesh | Teatro Dallas, CA; South Coast Repertory, CA; The Magic Theatre, CA; The San Diego Repertory, CA; Latino Chicago Theatre Company; Long Beach Playhouse, CA; Los Medanos College, Pittsburg, CA; 24th Street Theater, San Antonio, TX | Oct 1998; May 1990; Oct 1990; Feb 1991; Nov 1991; May 1997; Oct-Nov 2014; Oct 2005 |
| Prospect | El Teatro Campesino; Latino Chicago Theatre Company; The Magic Theatre; North Coast Repertory, CA; University of California, San Diego | Apr 1993; Sep 1993; Jan 1996; May 2002; 2002 |
| La Posada Magica | Odyssey Theatre Los Angeles; La Companía, Albuquerque, NM; South Coast Repertory; San Jose Repertory, CA; Teatro Visión, San Jose; University of New Mexico, Albuquerque; The Guadalupe Center | Dec 1996; 1996; Dec 1994-2008; Dec 1995; 2000, 2002, 2004; 2002; 2003-04 |
| El Paso Blue | Intersection for the Arts; The San Diego Repertory; Teatró Vista/NEXT Theatre, Chicago; University of Washington, Seattle; Oregon Shakespeare Festival; The Venture Theatre, Philadelphia, PA; Miracle Theatre Group, Portland, OR; Summer Play Festival, New York, NY; Quantum Theatre, Pittsburgh, PA; Cornish College, Seattle, WA | May 1994; Mar 1995; Sep 1997; 1998; Feb-June 1999; Nov 1999; Mar 2000; Aug 2004; Dec 2006; Nov 2011 |
| Santos and Santos | Thick Description Company; The Dallas Theater Center; Mixed Blood THeatre Company; Teatro Vista, Chicago; Campo Santo/Thick Description; University of Washington, Seattle; Texas Tech University, Lubbock; Cal State University, Monterey Bay; California State University, Sacramento; University of Texas at El Paso; Imua Theatre Company, New York, NY; Nushank Theatre Collective, Austin, TX; El Centro Su Teatro, Denver, CO; San Pedro Playhouse, Can Antonio, TX; Teatro Visión, San Jose | Dec 1993; May 1995; Jan 1996; May 1996; July 1996; 1997; 1998; 2000; 2002; 2003; July 2000; Dec 2000; Feb 2004; Mar 2005; May 2005 |
| El Otro | Thick Description, San Francisco, CA | July 1998, Aug-Sep 2009 |
| Shiner | Undermain Theatre, Dallas, TX | 1999 |
| Dreamlandia | The Dallas Theater Center; Thick Description; Teatro Vista | May 2000; Aug 2002; Mar 2008 |
| The Seven Visions of Encarnación | Shadowlight Productions | Oct 2002 |
| Bethlehem | Campo Santo, Intersection for the Arts, San Francisco, CA; Proxy Theatre, San Antonio | July 2003; Aug 2013 |
| Gibraltar | The Oregon Shakespeare Festival; Thick Description, San Francisco, CA; San Jose Stage Company, San Jose, CA | July 2005; Nov-Dec 2006; Feb-Mar 2007 |
| The Ballad of Pancho and Lucy | Campo Santo, Intersection for the Arts, San Francisco, CA | Oct-Nov 2005 |
| Lethe | Cornerstone Theatre Institute | Aug 2006 |
| Marfa Lights | West Texas State A&M University, TX; St. Mary's College of California | Oct 2006; Nov 2006 |
| June in a Box | CampoSanto, Intersection for the Arts; St. Mary's College of California | Mar 2008; Nov 2011 |
| Lydia | The Denver Center for the Performing Arts; Attic Rep, San Antonio, TX; The Yale Repertory Theatre; Marin Theatre Company; Center Theatre Group/Mark Taper Forum; National Pastime Theatre, Chicago; Sul Ross University, Alpine TX; Napa Valley Conservatory Theatre; Cara Mia Theatre Company, Dallas, TX | Jan 2008; 2009; Feb 2009; Mar 2009; Apr 2009; Oct 2013; Oct 2013; Jan-Feb 2015; Apr 2015 |
| Quixote (adaptation) | Oregon Shakespeare Festival, Ashland, Oregon | June 2009 |
| Ghosts of the River | Teatro Visión; Shadowlight Productions, San Jose/San Francisco, CA | Oct-Nov 2009; Oct 2009 |
| The Pastures of Heaven | California Shakespeare Theatre, Berkeley, CA; The Western Stage, Salinas, CA | June 2010; June 2012 |
| Cloudlands | South Coast Repertory Theatre, CA | Apr 2012 |
| Se Llama Cristina | Magic Theatre; Kitchen Dog Theatre; Theatre at Boston Court; INTAR Theatre, NY | Jan 2013; May 2013; Jan-Feb 2014; Apr–May 2015 |
| Alicia's Miracle | Tides Theatre in collaboration with the Center for the Investigative Reporting | Jan-Feb 2015 |
| Mother Road | Oregon Shakespeare Festival, Ashland, Oregon | Mar-Oct 2019 |
| Quixote Nuevo | Round House Theatre; Denver Center; South Coast Rep; Seattle Rep; Portland Center Stage; Oregon Shakespeare Festival | Sep-Oct 2021; May–June 2022; Sep-Oct 2023; Jan-Feb 2024; Mar 2024; July-Oct 2025 |
| Scene with Cranes | Roy and Edna Disney CalArts Theatre | Sep-Oct 2022 |

== Books ==
- Retablos: Stories From a Life Lived Along the Border, City Lights, 2018
