= Migdalia Cruz =

American dramatist

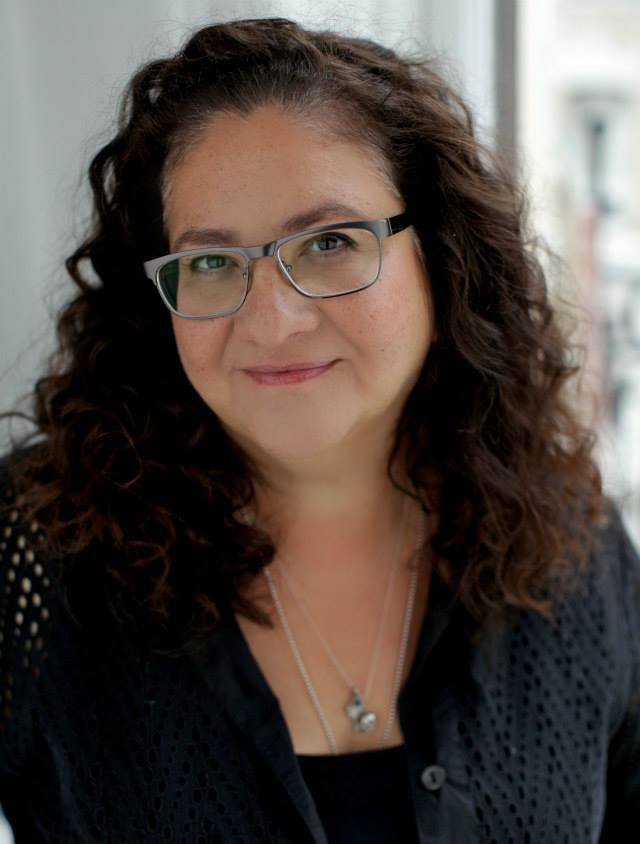
- Born: New York City, New York, U.S.
- Education: Lake Erie College (BFA); Columbia University (MFA)
- Occupations: Writer, plays, operas, screenplays, musicals
- Writing career
- Years active: 1984–present
- Notable works: Latino Chicago Theatre Company writer in residence Lark's Mexico/US Word Exchange; Plays: Miriam's Flowers, FUR, SALT, Another Part of the House, Lucy Loves Me, Two Roberts, Satyricoño, Lolita de Lares, El Grito Del Bronx, Never Moscow
- Notable awards: New York Foundation for the Arts Fellow in Playwriting/Screenwriting (2016); Helen Merrill Distinguished Playwright Award (2013); NEA; Kennedy Center Fund for New American Plays Award; McKnight Fellowship, among others.
- Website: migdaliacruz.com

Migdalia Cruz (born November 8, 1958) is a writer of plays, musical theatre and opera in the U.S. and has been translated into Spanish, French, Arabic, Greek, and Turkish.

Her works have been produced in venues as diverse as Playwrights Horizons in New York City, the Old Red Lion Theatre in London, Miracle Theatre in Portland, Oregon, Ateneo Puertorriqueño in San Juan, the National Theatre of Greece in Athens, and Houston Grand Opera. Other venues around the world include: Mabou Mines, Classic Stage Company, INTAR, Brooklyn Academy of Music, Monarch Theater, En-Garde Arts, HOME, Shaliko Company, New York Shakespeare Festival's Festival Latino, Theatre For The New City, and the W.O.W. Cafe (New York); Ateneo Puertorriqueño (PR); National Theater of Greece (Athens); Foro Sor Juana Ines de la Cruz (Mexico City); Vancouver Players (Vancouver, B.C.); Latino Chicago Theater Company (Chicago); American Repertory Theatre (Cambridge); Cleveland Public Theatre (Cleveland); Frank Theatre (Minneapolis); Théâtre d’aujourd hui (Montreal); American Music Theatre Festival (Philadelphia); Intersection for the Arts/LATA (San Francisco); and Cornerstone Theater Company (Los Angeles).

Cruz is the recipient of numerous awards including the National Endowment for the Arts playwriting fellowship (in 1991 and 1995). In 1999, she was named the first Sackler Artist in the School of Fine Arts at the University of Connecticut where she worked on Featherless Angels her commissioned play about children in war torn countries. In 1995, her research took her to Cambodia (where she met with former child soldiers of the Khymer Rouge), Croatia (where she met Bosnian child refugees), and to Dharamsala, India, where she interviewed the Dalai Lama along with teenage members of the Tibetan refugee community.

In December 2013, Cruz was awarded the New York Community Trust/Helen Merrill Distinguished Playwright's Award. She is a recipient of the Kennedy Center's Fund for New American Plays award for Another Part of the House (1996). In 1994, she was the PEW/TCG National Artist-in-Residence at Classic Stage Company in New York. She was a McKnight Fellow in 1988.

== Early life and education ==
Cruz was born to Puerto Rican parents in the Bronx, New York on November 8, 1958.

Cruz received her MFA degree from Columbia University and is an alumna of New Dramatists (1987-1994).

== Influences ==
Cruz's writing is known for its bold poetic crispness, violence and sexuality, transforming the ugly to beautiful. Her mentor, María Irene Fornés, has noted the voluptuousness of her work. Playwright Tony Kushner has said that "one can feel history in the bones of her characters," and indeed, her themes are drawn from Latinx history and her personal experiences of growing up in the South Bronx.

From 1991 to 1998, Cruz was a playwright in residence at Latino Chicago Theater Company. Cruz also worked with María Irene Fornés at INTAR'S HPRL (Hispanic Playwrights-in-Residence Laboratory) from 1984–1991, a professional workshop for Latino/a writers in New York City. Cruz was profoundly influenced by Fornés and expressed her gratitude in several short plays, essays, and poems, including "A Double Haiku for Irene Because She Detests the Ordinary From Her Eternal Fan, Migdalia:"

In six lines or less –
I must honor the teacher
who gave me the moon.
It was an honest,
clear, yet savage light, poured from
desire's heart-fire.

One of her most profound experiences was in 2007, working with the experimental theater company, Mabou Mines, and one of its founders, Ruth Maleczech, on a floating play on a barge in the East River, an echo to Walt Whitman's "Song of New York" 100 years later, a love letter to the post-9/11 survival spirit of New York City, called "Song for New York: What Women Do While Men Sit Knitting", written in five parts, one for each borough, by five women poets—Cruz wrote the Bronx song: Da Bronx Rocks/From the Country to the Country of the Bronx, with composer Lisa Gutkin of The Klezmatics.

She has also been nurtured by Royal Court Theatre/New Dramatists Exchange '94 (London); Steppenwolf Theatre's New PlaysLab (Chicago); Bay Area Playwrights' Festival '94, Festival Latino '93 at Teatro Mision (San Francisco); the Sundance Institute; Midwest PlayLabs; Mark Taper Forum's New Play Festival; Omaha Magic Theatre; "Songs from Coconut Hill" Theater Festival '05; and South Coast Rep's HPP '04.

Cruz has taught and lectured across the country and abroad in community centers, theaters, and schools, from junior high to graduate level, at NYU, Princeton, Earlham, UNT, Mission Cultural Center & Intersection for the Arts (San Francisco), UC Riverside, Amherst, Lake Erie College, UNM (Albuquerque), Brown, Monarch Theater at La MaMa Experimental Theatre Club & P.S. 106 (NYC), and Alameda Theatre Company (Toronto), among others.

== Plays ==
Cruz has written more than 50 plays including:

- NEVER MOSCOW
- SATYRICOÑO (work in progress)
- TWO ROBERTS: A PIRATE BLUES PROJECT
- EL GRITO DEL BRONX
- FUR
- ANOTHER PART OF THE HOUSE
- TELLING TALES
- SONG FOR NY :: WHAT WOMEN DO WHILE MEN SIT KNITTING
- X & Y STORIES
- THE HAVE-LITTLE
- YELLOW EYES
- PRIMER CONTACTO
- MIRIAM'S FLOWERS
- HAMLET: Asalto a la Inocencia
- FEATHERLESS ANGELS
- MARILUZ's THANKSGIVING
- DANGER
- SALT
- ¡CHE-CHE-CHE!
- DYLAN & THE FLASH
- SO…
- CIGARETTES AND MOBY-DICK
- DREAMS OF HOME
- LOLITA de LARES
- WINNIE-IN-THE-CITIE
- FRIDA: The Story of Frida Kahlo
- RUSHING WATERS
- LUCY LOVES ME
- RUNNING FOR BLOOD: NO. 3
- WHISTLE
- STREET SENSE
- OCCASIONAL GRACE
- THE TOUCH OF AN ANGEL
- WELCOME BACK TO SALAMANCA
- WHEN GALAXY SIX & THE BRONX COLLIDE
- LOOSE LIPS
- COCONUTS
- SHE WAS SOMETHING...
- SENSIBLE SHOES
- NOT TIME's FOOL
- LATINS IN LA-LA LAND
- BROCCOLI
- GRACE FALLS
- SAFE
- THIS IS JUST A TEST
- DRIPPING DOWN
- PILLAR OF SALT

== Screenplays ==
- BLANK VERSE (co-written with Juan A. Ramirez)
- CARMEN’S MOUNTAIN (co-written with Michael Angel Cuesta)

== Publications ==
Cruz's plays and monologues are published by NoPassport Press, Theatre Communications Group, U. of Arizona Press, Routledge Press, Penguin Books, Arte Publico Press, Applause Books, Smith & Kraus Publishers, and Third Woman Press, including:

- DREAMS OF HOME, in The Best American Short Plays 1990–92, ed. Howard Stein and Glenn Young (New Jersey: The Fireside Theatre, 1992), 23–47; and, The Best Short Plays of 1991–92, ed. Howard Stein and Glenn Young, (Applause Books, 1992).
- MIRIAM'S FLOWERS, in Shattering the Myth: Plays by Hispanic Women, ed. Denise Chavez (Houston: Arte Publico Press, 1992), 51–84; and, Theatre Communications Group's Plays in Process, V.11, N.1.; and, The Presbyter's Peartree, Las Flores de Miriam, translated by Manuel Pereiras Garcia, (1994); and, Instituto de Cultura Puertorriqueña/ARTWORKS/NEA, TEATRO PUERTORRIQUEÑA EN ESTADOS UNIDOS, Las flores de Miriam, translated by Roberto Irizarry, with notes by Rosalina Perales, (2011); and, Universidad Veracuzana, Tramoya: Cuaderno de Teatro, Las Flores de Miriam, translated by Roberto Irizarry, tercera epoca, 116, (Jul/Sep. 2013).
- TELLING TALES, in Telling Tales: New One Act Plays, ed. Eric Lane (Penguin: New York, 1993), 1– 16; and, Bilingual Translations of 3 of the TALES: Sand, Fire & Jesus, Ollantay Theater Magazine's Puerto Rican Theater Issue, which includes an essay about MIRIAM’S FLOWERS by Roberto Irizarry and other scholarly essays by Rosalina Perales which reference the work. v. XVIII, n.35-36, (Fall, 2010);
- FRIDA, in Puro Teatro: An Anthology of Latina Theatre, Performance, and Testimonios, eds. Nancy Saporta Sternbach & Alberto Sandoval, (University of Arizona Press, 2000); and, Here To Stay: Five Plays from The Women's Project, ed. Julia Miles, (Applause Books, 1997); and, Houston Grand Opera published libretto, (1993) and G. Schrimer Music published the music in 1994.
- THE HAVE-LITTLE, in Contemporary Plays by Women of Color, eds. Roberta Uno & Kathy Perkins, 106–26, (Routledge Press, 1996);
- WINNIE-IN-THE-CITIE in Actor's Playbook: Theatre Arts—The Dynamics of Acting (National Textbook Company, 1997);
- LUCY LOVES ME, in Latinas on Stage: Criticism and Practice, ed. Alicia Arrizón and Lillian Manzor Coats (Berkeley: Third Woman Press, 2000)., and, the Omaha Magic Theatre, Right Brain Vacation Photos: New Plays & Production Photos 1972–1992, eds. Jo Ann Schmisman, Sara Kimberlain, Megan Terry, 1992.
- FUR, in Out of the Fringe: Contemporary Latina/o Theatre and Performance, ed. Caridad Svich and Teresa Marrero (New York: Theatre Communications Group, 2000);
- So...& MARILUZ'S THANKSGIVING in PositiveNegative: women of color and HIV/AIDS, eds. Imani Harrington & Cheryl Bellamy (Aunt Lute Books, 2002);
- EL GRITO DEL BRONX & Other Plays by Migdalia Cruz, includes EL GRITO DEL BRONX, SALT, YELLOW EYES & DA BRONX ROCKS, eds. Caridad Svich, Randy Gener, Otis Ramsey-Zoe (NoPassport Press, 2010);
- CIGARETTES & MOBY-DICK, included in: Envisioning the Americas:Latina/o Theatre & Performance, Migdalia Cruz, John Jesurun, Oliver Mayer, Alejandro Morales, and Anne Garcia-Romero Preface by Jose Rivera, Introduction by Caridad Svich, (NoPassport Press: Dreaming the Americas Series, 2011);
- ANOTHER PART OF THE HOUSE in La Voz Latina: Contemporary Plays and Performance Pieces by Latinas, ed. Elizabeth C. Ramirez & Catherine Casiano (U. of Illinois Press, 2011)

Ms. Cruz also contributed a Chapter in CONDUCTING A LIFE: Testimonials for Maria Irene Fornés, ed. Caridad Svich & Maria Delgado, (Smith & Kraus, 2000).

Scenes and Monologues from MIRIAM’S FLOWERS, THE HAVE-LITTLE, FRIDA, LUCY LOVES ME, RUSHING WATERS, TELLING TALES & LATINS IN LA-LA LAND:

- Monologues For Latino/a Actors, ed. Micha Espinosa, (Smith & Kraus Publishers, 2014);
- Applause Acting Series, Best Contemporary Monologues For Women 18–35, ed. Lawrence Harbison (Applause Theatre & Cinema Books, 2014);
- Applause Acting Series, best monologues from the best American short plays, volume one, ed. William w. demastes (Applause Theatre & Cinema Books, 2014);
- Leading women: Plays for Actresses II, ed. Eric Lane and Nina Shengold (Vintage Books, 2002);
- Monologues For Actors of Color: Women, ed. Roberta Uno (Routledge Press, 1998);
- The Great Monologues from the Women's Project, The Best Men's Stage Monologues of 1990 & The Best Men's Stage Monologues of 1991, The Best Women's Stage Monologues of 1991, The Best Women's Stage Monologues of 1990, The Best Stage Scenes For Women From the 1980s, The Best Stage Scenes For Men From the 1980s (Smith And Kraus, Inc.);
- Multicultural Theatre, ed. Roger Ellis (Meriwether Publishing Ltd., 1996);
- Childsplay, ed. Kerry Muir (Limelight Editions, New York, 1995);

The work is referenced in several scholarly texts, in articles and interviews by Tiffany Ana Lopez (UCR), Jorge Huerta (UCSD), Analola Santana (U.of Florida), Alberto Sandoval (Mt. Holyoke College), Maria Teresa Marrero (UNT), Maria Delgado (U. of London), and Caridad Svich.

Also, interviewed in the following publications: Trans-global readings: Crossing theatrical boundaries, ed. Caridad Svich, Manchester (University Press, 2003); Women Who Write Plays: Interviews with American Dramatists, ed. Alexis Greene (Smith & Kraus Books, 2001); Chicanas/Latinas In American Theatre: A history of Performance, by Elizabeth C. Ramirez (Indiana University Press, 2000); Latinas On Stage: Criticism and Practice, eds. Alicia Arrizón & Lillian Manzor (Third Woman Press, 2000); Ollantay Theater Magazine, V.1, N.2, ed. Pedro R. Monge-Rafuls, V.V, N.1, and V.IX, N.18, ed. Maria Teresa Marrero, V.XIX, N.38. PAJ, V. XXXI, No.3, ed. Bonnie Marranca, in article of Fornés as Teacher, 2009. Dramatists Guild Quarterly, V.32, N.3, Autumn 1995.

In Spanish, the work is referenced in: ME LLAMAN DESDE ALLÁ, by Rosalina Perales, Impresora Soto Castillo, S.A., 2010; Instituto de Cultura Puertorriqueña/ARTWORKS/NEA, TEATRO PUERTORRIQUEÑA EN ESTADOS UNIDOS, Las flores de Miriam, translated by Roberto Irizarry, with notes by Rosalina Perales, 2011; & in OLLANTAY THEATER MAGAZINE's Puerto Rican Theater Issue, which includes an essay about MIRIAM’S FLOWERS by Roberto Irizarry and other scholarly essays by Rosalina Perales which reference the work, including Spanish translations of 3 of the TALES: Sand, Fire & Jesus, v. XVIII, n.35-36, Fall, 2010.

== Translations ==
Affectionately known as the madrina of the Lark's Mexico/US Playwright Exchange, Cruz has translated four plays for the project, 2008–2013.

- SKY ON THE SKIN (with author Edgar Chías)
- ALASKA (with author Gibran Portela)
- LAS MENINAS (with author Ernesto Anaya)
- VAN GOGH IN NEW YORK (with author Jorge Celaya)

== Recent projects ==
- El Grito del Bronx at Brown University (4/14), NYU/Tisch (4/08), at the Milagro Theatre (OR) 4/09, and at the Goodman in a co-production with Teatro Vista & CollaborAction (IL), 7/09;
- FUR presented at UNM@ Albuquerque, 3/08.
- Developed Two Roberts: A Pirate-Blues Project at the Lark (NY) with a 2010 NYSCA grant; is inspired by Petronius’ (69a.d.) & Fellini's (1968) Satyricon to write Satyricoño about 21st C. America;
- Never Moscow, a play about Chekhov, his marriage to Olga, & his death by consumption as he wrote the Three Sisters.
- Co-teaching with experimental theater artist, John Jesurun, for the Monarch Theater @LaMama (NY) in 2010
- Telling Tales produced in Santurce, P.R., Interacto (1/13); and Lucy Loves Me, produced by INTAR in 2/13.

== Teaching ==
Cruz has taught playwriting at U.of Iowa/Playwrights’ Workshop, NYU's Tisch School of the Arts, Princeton University, and at Amherst College, and guest lectured at Yale University, Wesleyan University, Mount Holyoke College, and Columbia University.

== Awards and recognition ==
- 2013 Helen Merrill Distinguished Playwright Award (NYCommTrust)
- 1996 recipient of the Kennedy Center's Fund for New American Plays award for Another Part Of The House.
- 1991 Susan Smith Blackburn Prize, Her play, The Have-little was the runner-up for the and SALT was a 1997 runner-up.
- 2009 Obsidian Theatre of Toronto's International Playwrights Festival
- 2005 Massachusetts Cultural Council grant
- 1994 Connecticut Commission on The Arts grant for playwriting
- 1994 PEW/TCG National Artist in Residence., Classic Stage Company.
- 1997-98 Sackler Fellow at Connecticut Rep/UConn
- 1991 & 1995 NEA Playwriting Fellow
- 1988 McKnight Fellow,
- MFA, Columbia University
- Alumna of New Dramatists.
