= Latino theater in the United States =

Latino theater presents a wide range of aesthetic approaches, dramatic structures, and themes, ranging from love, romance, immigration, border politics, nation building, incarceration, and social justice. Whether of a linguistic, ethnic, political, cultural or sexual nature, the plays often have a social justice component involving Latino people living in the United States. The Oxcart by René Marqués, Marisol by José Rivera, and In the Heights by Lin-Manuel Miranda are examples of staged Broadway plays. There is also a strong tradition of Latino avant-garde and absurdist theater, which double as political satires; prime examples include The Masses are Asses by Pedro Pietri and United States of Banana by Giannina Braschi.

Spanish language theater companies and in Latino theater festivals in the United States present Spanish, Spanglish, English language plays in major American cities, including New York, Chicago, Tucson, Seattle, Denver.

== Assimilation in Latino/Hispanic Theater ==
In the early 20th century, adaptation, and assimilation of Latino immigrants to the United States, and the use of their own version of their language in America, began to translate into the written work of Latino theater. One of the first mainstream plays that was written about the Latino culture and immigration experience in the United States was The Oxcart by René Marqués. The Oxcart dramatizes the conflicts between Puerto Rican belonging and displacement on the mainland. 21st century Puerto Rican and Nuyorican dramatic works address not only American culture but the actual formation of the United States government. Examples are the Broadway musical Hamilton by Lin-Manuel Miranda, which tells the story of the American revolution in 1776, and the postcolonial experimental United States of Banana by Giannina Braschi who dramatizes the collapse of the American empire on September 11, 2001.

The theater historian Jorge Huerta writes "...you cannot analyze or write about Latina/o theater without also sounding like a sociologist, a political scientist, an ethnographer, etc., because these are all vital discourses in the understanding of our cultures as Latinas and Latinos." He distinguishes the theaters of the three major Latina/o groups – the Chicanas/os, Cuban-Americans and Puerto Ricans – in terms of the history of relations of the three groups with the United States, emphasizing the similarities and differences in their experiences.

Among the Chicano playwrights of note is Luis Alfaro wrote play Oedipus El Rey at The Public Theater reset Oedipus Rex in South Central LA with a Latino Oedipus. Alfaro also adapted Sophocles’ Elektra, which he transformed into Electricidad, a story about a SoCal drug lord. Euripides’ Medea became Mojada: A Medea in Los Angeles. Cherríe Moraga writes feminist theater, including Watsonville/Circle in the Dirt (2002) and The Hungry Woman (2001).

Born of a Jewish father and Puerto Rican mother, Quiara Alegría Hudes has written many plays, including The Good Peaches and The Happiest Song Plays Last. Among her most successful works are the book for the musical In the Heights (finalist for the 2008 Pulitzer Prize for Drama) and Water by the Spoonful (for which she won the 2012 Pulitzer Prize for Drama). Her play Elliot, a Soldier's Fugue was a finalist for the 2007 Pulitzer Prize for Drama.

Other Latino theater artists include Evelina Fernández, Dolores Prida, Ilan Stavans, María Irene Fornés, Cherríe Moraga, Caridad Svich, Quiara Alegría Hudes, Jorge Ignacio Cortiñas, Tanya Saracho, and Octavio Solis. Their works address histories of oppression, political and economic status, cultural nationalism, third world solidarity, multiculturalism—and their many discontents.

== Ethnic and racial stereotyping ==
=== Misrepresentation: staged racism ===
Concerns over ethnic stereotyping and racism have recurred, in the misrepresentation of Latino people in works such as West Side Story, which was written by non-Latino artists. There are also controversies about the assignment of Latino theater roles to non-Latino actors.

Latino peoples and cultures have frequently been portrayed on stage as being violent, rivalrous, exotic, and not wanting to adapt. Many consider the musical West Side Story an example of Puerto Rican stereotypes; much future racist discussion about Puerto Ricans and other Latinos stemmed from this musical. The musical was written by non-Latinos: the book was by Arthur Laurents, the music was written by Leonard Bernstein, and lyrics were written by Stephen Sondheim. Many believe that the underlying message is that Latino culture is dangerous and must be policed and controlled.

=== Casting ===
Latinos have often found it difficult to be cast in roles that have not been specifically written to be played by a Latino. Many casting directors have begun to use the term "color blind" casting; however, this has caused controversy, as if a show is cast improperly with certain races in certain roles, it may be perceived by audiences as well as the theater community as wrong or racist. Actors seek theater producer's statements that there will be no discrimination in the casting process. Nevertheless, there have been films, TV shows, and plays that have been written for Latino actors, but played by non-Latino actors. An example of this is TheaterWorks' production of The Motherf**ker With the Hat.

== Latino playwrights and directors ==
- Agustín Cuzzani
- Anne García-Romero
- Antón Arrufat
- Caridad Svich
- Carlos Lacámara
- Cherríe Moraga
- Dolores Prida
- Emilio Carballido
- Giannina Braschi
- Héctor Santiago
- José Corrales
- José Rivera (Marisol)
- Lin-Manuel Miranda
- Luis Rafael Sánchez
- Luis Santeiro
- Luis Valdez
- Manuel Martín Jr.
- Manuel Pereiras García
- María Irene Fornés
- María Julia Casanova
- María Ruiz de Burton
- Nilo Cruz
- Pedro Pietri
- René Marqués (The Oxcart)
- Susana Cook
- Rosario Vargas (Aguijón Theater)
- C. Julian Jiménez
- Carlos Gorostiza
- Egon Wolff
- Gabriel García Márquez
- Griselda Gambaro
- Jorge dìaz
- José Triana
- Luis Alberto Heiremans
- Luis Alfaro
- Luisa Josefina Hernández
- Osvaldo Dragùn
- Quiara Alegría Hudes
- René Marqués

== Latino plays and musicals ==
- The Capeman
- Elliot, A Soldier's Fugue (Pulitzer Finalist)
- Four Guys Named Jose and Una Mujer Named Maria
- Hamilton
- In the Heights
- Kiss of the Spider Woman
- Marisol
- La Pasión según Antígona Pérez, a tragedy based on the life of Olga Viscal Garriga
- The Oxcart/La Carreta
- On Your Feet
- United States of Banana
- Water by the Spoonful (2012 Pulitzer Prize winner)
- West Side Story
- Watsonville (2002)
- The Hungry Woman (2001)

== See also ==
- Aguijón Theater
- Borderlands Theater
- Latino Theater Company
- Hispanic Organization of Latin Actors
- INTAR Theatre
- Puerto Rican Literature
- Latino Literature
- Milagro (theatre)
- Puerto Rican Traveling Theater
- Teatro Puerto Rico
- GALA Hispanic Theatre
- Pa'lante Theater Company

== General references ==
- Godinez, Henry. "So Many Stories To Tell." American Theatre 20.10 (2003): 48–52. International Bibliography of Theatre & Dance with Full Text. Web. 13 Mar. 2016.
- Graham-Jones, Jean. "Comment: On Attributions, Appropriations, Misinterpretations, And Latin American Theatre Studies." Theatre Journal 56.3 (2004): 347–351. Academic Search Premier. Web. 13 Mar. 2016.
- Horwitz, Siml. "Latino Theatre Artists: Opportunity And Challenge." Back Stage 42.31 (2001): 20. International Bibliography of Theatre & Dance with Full Text. Web. 13 Mar. 2016.
- Horwitz, Simi. "New Perspectives." Back Stage 44.12 (2003): 24. International Bibliography of Theatre & Dance with Full Text. Web. 13 Mar. 2016.
- Huerta, Jorge A. "Latino Theater Alliance/L.A. Encuentro 2013: We've Come A Long Way, Baby!." Gestos: Revista De Teoría Y Práctica Del Teatro Hispánico 28.56 (2013): 169–170. International Bibliography of Theatre & Dance with Full Text. Web. 13 Mar. 2016.
- Nestor, Frank. "Colorblindness And Controversy." Back Stage (19305966) 53.3 (2012): 2–3. International Bibliography of Theatre & Dance with Full Text. Web. 13 Mar. 2016.
- Svich, Caridad. "US Polyglot Latino Theatre And Its Link To The Americas 1." Contemporary Theatre Review 16.2 (2006): 189–197. Academic Search Premier. Web. 13 Mar. 2016.
- Tolkoff, Esther. "Not A Subculture: NYC's Thriving Latino Theatre." Back Stage 41.10 (2000): 5. International Bibliography of Theatre & Dance with Full Text. Web. 13 Mar. 2016.
- Valdez, Luis. "Chapter 77: Notes On Chicano Theater (1972)." Twentieth Century Theatre: A Sourcebook. 315–319. n.p.: Taylor & Francis Ltd / Books, 1995. International Bibliography of Theatre & Dance with Full Text. Web. 13 Mar. 2016.
- Google. (n.d.). Dramatists in revolt. Google Books. https://books.google.com/books?hl=en&lr=&id=g78rDQAAQBAJ&oi=fnd&pg=PR9&dq=Lyday%2C%2BL.%2BF.%2C%2B%26%2BWoodyard%2C%2BG.%2BW.%2BSource%2Bmaterials%2Bon%2BLatin%2BAmerican%2Btheater.%2BDramatists%2Bin%2BRevolt&ots=PVipjKpEHp&sig=1tffBfC-PbTEPK2L8fMBRq2tYsA#v=onepage&q&f=false
