= Watsonville (play) =

1996 play by Cherríe Moraga

Watsonville: Some Place Not Here is a three-act 1996 play by Cherríe Moraga. It depicts a cannery strike in Watsonville, California. Watsonville and the 1995 play Circle in the Dirt were published together in a single book by the West End Press. It is the sequel to the 1994 play Heroes and Saints. The play was a project of Stanford University.

Pareles wrote that Watsonville criticizes anti-immigration policies in California and Mexican-Americans perceived to have sold out to Anglo culture, or vendidos, who believe such policies should be compromised with. Ruben Mendoza of Confluencia: Revista Hispanica de Cultura y Literatura wrote that the play uses a communal third place (also known as a third space) to criticize "capitalist spatial practice". In addition the play also discusses the labor movement's gender and immigrant rights situation.

Moraga stated that the play is based "loosely on three actual events that took place in a central California coastal farmworker town by the same name." These events were a 1985–1987 cannery strike, a 1989 7.1 Richter scale earthquake, and a vision of the Lady of Guadalupe in the Pinto Lake County park. Lisa B. Thompson of the Theatre Journal wrote that there is "drama with vibrant dialogue and compelling, diverse characters" because Moraga did not use the words of those she interviewed for research purposes verbatim and instead "the voices Moraga listened to while researching the plays merge with her own."

Watsonville has select phrases and sentences in the dialog in the Spanish language instead of English. The play, along with Circle in the Dirt, uses dialog that is a mixture of English and Spanish to paraphrase the content of the interviews conducted by Moraga; most of the actual interviews were done entirely in Spanish. The music in the play includes bolero, cumbia, and rap. Some of the music includes original compositions.

== Plot ==
In the play, set in the mid-1990s, workers in a Watsonville, California cannery strike. The workers at the Pajaro Valley Cannery strike partly because they want additional rights, and also because they want to be paid better wages. As strategies the workers use a type of protest theater used by El Teatro Campesino and they also use hunger strikes in the manner done by César Chávez. At the same time, the area Latino community faces divisions as anti-immigration legislation is being proposed in California. During the play the politicians deliberate on Bill 1519, which is intended to separate the workers into legal residents and illegal immigrants as a way to divide them, referring to real-life border control legislation. Marissa Pareles of the Lambda Book Report wrote that "the end of the play "has only a bit of a Deus ex Machina feeling about it".

Lisa B. Thompson wrote that realism is the predominant atmosphere of the work, but that the work highlights the importance of the spiritual aspect of protesting by giving some characters relationships with spirits of the deceased and also having the Virgin of Guadalupe appear on a tree trunk. An earthquake with the magnitude 7.5 occurs during the story.

== Characters ==
- Lucha – A cannery worker, she learns enough English to use the language to express her romantic desire for Susana.
- Susana – Susana is a physician's assistant at a community clinic, and she is an activist. Susana and Lucha become girlfriends, and Susana refuses to be in the closet.
- Juan – Juan is an organizer for radical leftist causes. He is originally a priest who tries and fails to convince an area monsignor to bless a vision of the Virgin of Guadalupe.
- Dolores Valle – A migrant worker who sees the Virgin of Guadalupe, she ultimately dies in a hunger strike.
- Chente – A labor organizer
- Amparo

== See also ==
- Latino theatre in the United States
- Latino literature
