= Factory 449: a theatre collective =

Not-for-profit theater company

Factory 449: a theatre collective is a not-for-profit theatre company based in Washington, D.C. Factory 449's mission is to maintain an ensemble of multi-disciplinary artists and professionals who are dedicated to the collaborative process of creating "theatre as event". The members of this collective will assume roles involved in the development of new productions, affording artists the opportunity to write, act, direct and produce.

== Company members ==
- Rick Hammerly, Producing Artistic director
- Gillian Shelly, managing director
- Jesse Achtenberg
- Debbi Arseneaux
- Sara Barker
- Tom Carman
- Felicia Curry
- Brian Hemmingsen
- Lisa Hodsoll
- Nanna Ingvarsson
- Amy McWilliams
- Jennifer Phillips
- Karin Rosnizeck
- Greg Stevens
- Hunter Styles
- Joey Walls
- David Lamont Wilson

== Production history ==
2009–2010

4.48 Psychosis by Sarah Kane, Capital Fringe Festival
4.48 Psychosis by Sarah Kane, Warehouse Theatre
Factory Made: a reading series, Church Street Theatre and Human Rights Campaign

2010–2011

Magnificent Waste by Caridad Svich, Kennedy Center Page-to-Stage Festival
The Saint Plays by Erik Ehn (including World Premiere of The Monkey Seller), Church Street Theatre
Our Wide Wide Sea (Mar Nuestro) by Alberto Pedro, Translated by Caridad Svich, Intersections Arts Festival at Atlas Performing Arts Center
Magnificent Waste by Caridad Svich (World Premiere), Mead Theatre Lab at Flashpoint

2011–2012

Factory Made 2: a reading series
The Ice Child by Lisa Hodsoll, Rick Hammerly & Hunter Styles (World Premiere), Mead Theatre Lab at Flashpoint

== Awards and honors ==
- 2011 John Aniello Award for Outstanding Emerging Theatre Company
- Cultural Development Corporation Award for resident theatre company in 2011–2012 Mead Theatre Lab Program
- Cultural Development Corporation and Creative Communities Fund Award for resident theatre company in 2010–2011 Mead Theatre Lab Program
- Best Play, "4.48 Psychosis", DC Theatre Scene, Audience Choice Awards, 2009
- Best Drama, "4.48 Psychosis", Theatremania's Pick of the Fringe, Capital Fringe Festival 2009
- Best Overall Production, "4.48 Psychosis", Theatremania's Pick of the Fringe, Capital Fringe Festival 2009
- Official Selection, United Nations Week 2009
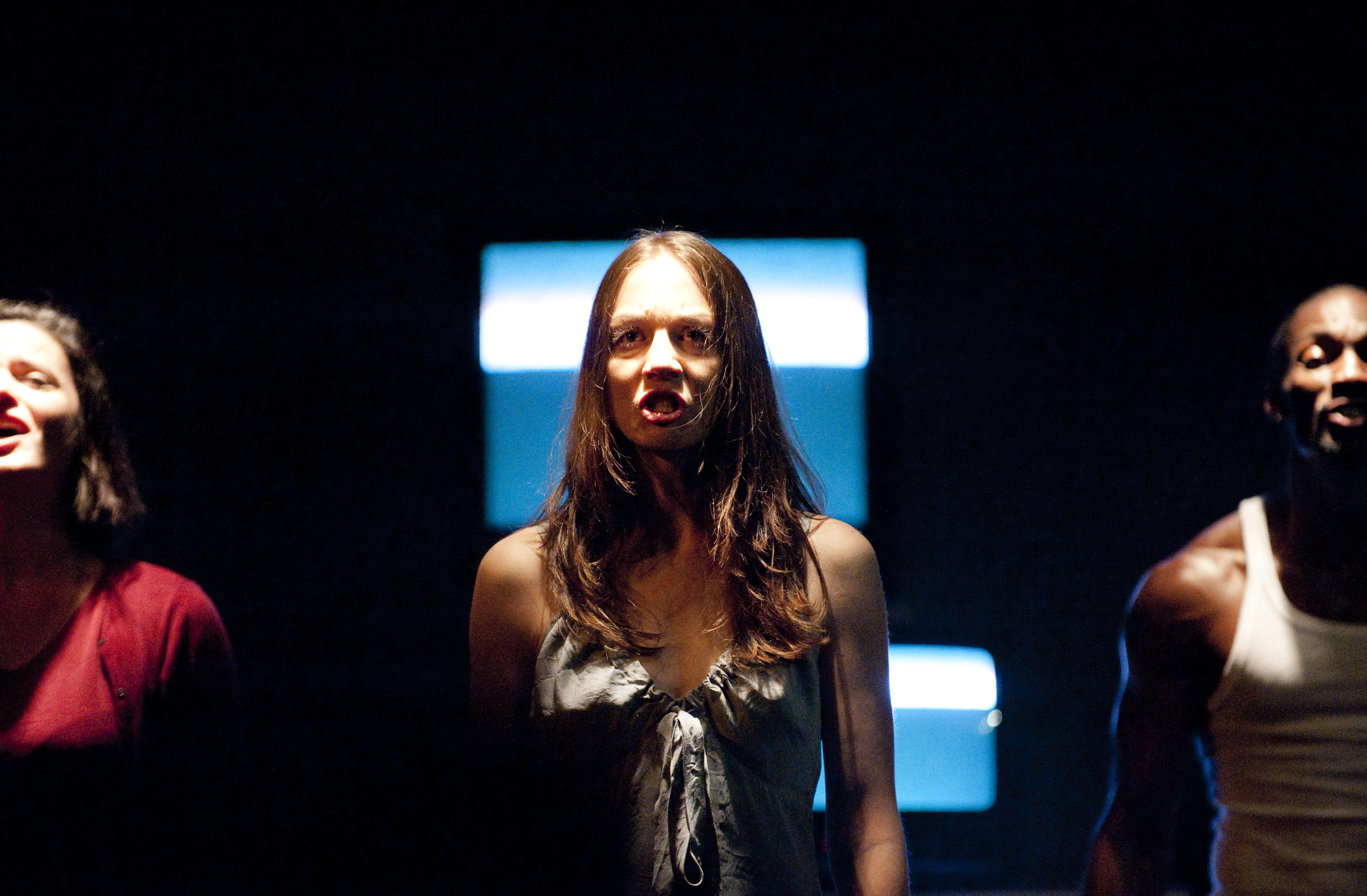
"4.48 Psychosis" Factory 449, Warehouse Theatre, October 2009
