= Circle in the Dirt =

1995 play by Cherríe Moraga

Circle in the Dirt: El Pueblo de East Palo Alto is a 1995 play by Cherríe Moraga. It is set in East Palo Alto, California, a community in the San Francisco Bay Area. Circle in the Dirt and the 1996 play Watsonville were published together in a single book by the West End Press.

The story takes place on the day of a scheduled demolition of two buildings in East Palo Alto. As a result, it is the dissolution of a racially diverse community. In the play the characters discuss national events in the past and question the future.

The play, along with Watsonville, uses dialog that is a mixture of English and Spanish to paraphrase the content of the interviews conducted by Moraga; most of the actual interviews were done entirely in Spanish.

== Characters ==
- La Capitana - She is a Mexican Muwekma woman who discusses how Native Americans previously lived on what is now East Palo Alto and how the remains of her ancestors are housed at Stanford University. Lisa B. Thompson of the Theatre Journal wrote that she is "aging and ageless".
- One African-American woman states that when her children were in integrated schools the children had academic improvement but were psychologically harmed.
- An elderly white husband and wife
- A 12-year-old female Samoan American
- A middle-aged immigrant from Mexico
