= 47th Street Theatre =

Off-Broadway theatre in Manhattan, New York

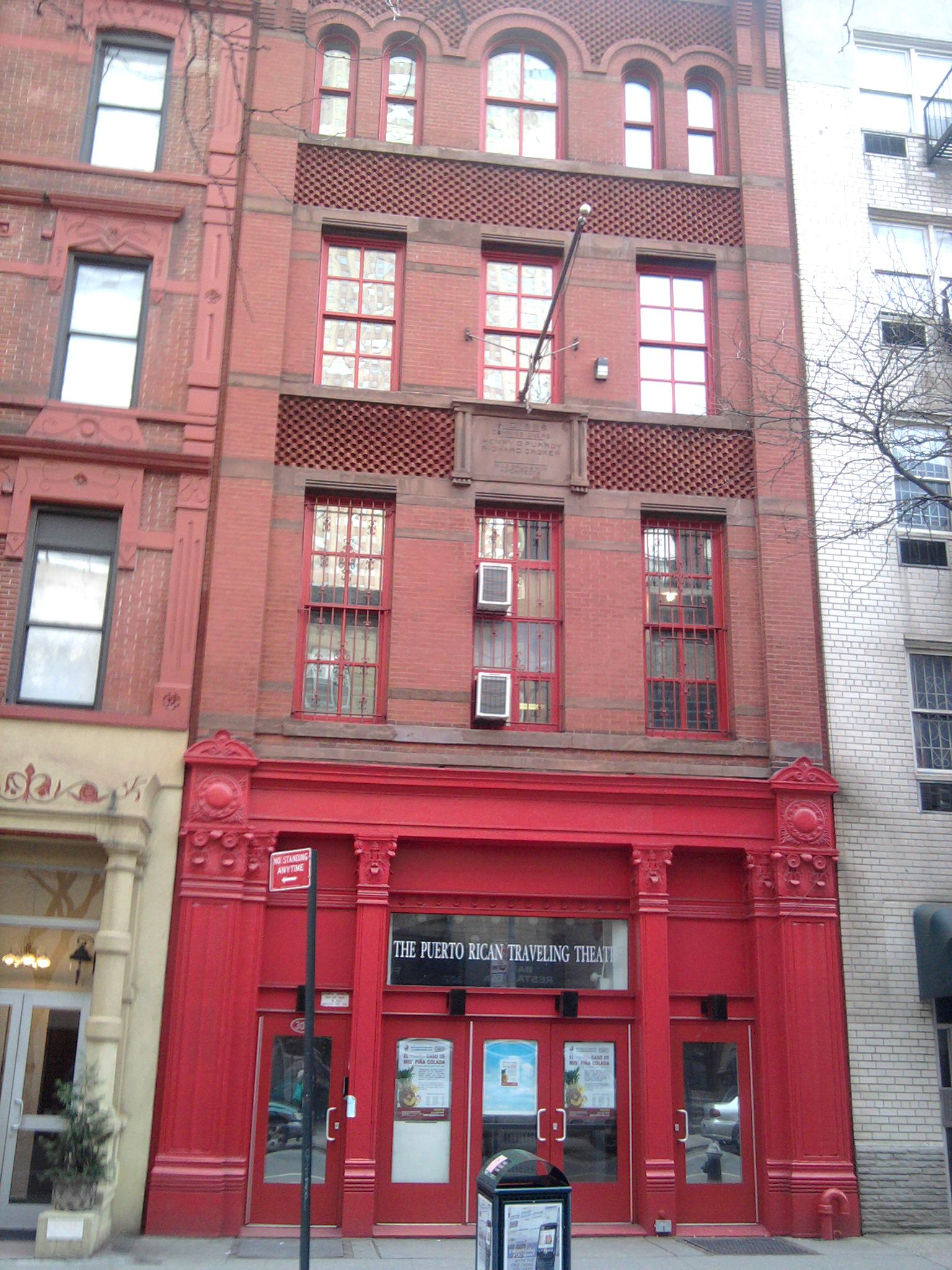
- Interactive map of 47th Street Theatre
- Address: 304 W. 47th Street; New York City; United States
- Coordinates: 40.7605°N 73.9881°W
- Capacity: 196
- Type: Off-Broadway

New York City Landmark
- Designated: November 18, 2008
- Reference no.: 2299

47th Street Theatre is an Off Broadway theatre venue at 304 West 47th Street in New York City's Hell's Kitchen neighborhood. Built as Fire Engine Company No. 54 in 1888, it was revived as a theater in the early 1970s. It hosted the Forbidden Broadway series in the late 2000s, and is currently owned by the Puerto Rican Traveling Theater.

== History ==
Built as Fire Engine Company No. 54 in 1888, it was designed by Napoleon LeBrun & Sons for the New York City Fire Department. It is a New York City designated landmark.

By the early 1970s, the firehouse had been abandoned, and Miriam Colon revived the building as a home for the Puerto Rican Traveling Theater. In 2007, the theater began showing productions of the Forbidden Broadway series of shows. Considered an off-Broadway, institution, Forbidden Broadway ended its 27-year run on March 1, 2009.

In 2015, Masterworks Theater Company opened its inaugural season at the 47th Street Theatre with a production of The Glass Menagerie. In June 2017, Spamilton, a parody of the musical Hamilton moved to the theatre from the Triad Theatre. Spamilton ran for more than 500 performances across venues, ultimately closing on January 7, 2018.

Other past productions at the 47th Street Theatre included Los Big Names (2006), Dai (enough) (2007), Macbeth (2012), The Very Hungry Caterpillar Show (2016), B-Boy Blues: The Play (2021), the beautiful land i seek (2024), Parrots at the Pagoda (2025), Baile Cangrejero (2025), and The Wedding March (2026). 47th Street Theatre has hosted shows for the New York Musical Festival (NYMF).

As of 2026, the theater is still owned by the Puerto Rican Traveling Theater.

== See also ==
- 223 East 25th Street – a former fire house in Manhattan with a similar design by Napoleon LeBrun & Sons
