= Puerto Rican Traveling Theater =

Theater company based at the 47th Street Theater in New York City, NY, US

- Formation: 1967
- Founders: Míriam Colón and Roberto Rodríguez
- Type: Theatre group
- Location: New York City
- Artistic director: Rosalba Rolón
- Website: pregonesprtt.org

The Puerto Rican Traveling Theater is a theater company based at the 47th Street Theater in New York City. It was founded as El Nuevo Círculo Dramatico (The New Drama Circuit) by Míriam Colón and Roberto Rodríguez.

It was one of the first Puerto Rican theater companies to be founded and is credited with kickstarting the Hispanic and Puerto Rican theater scene in New York. The first production by the company was La Carreta (The Oxcart) in 1953, written by René Marqués and directed by founder Roberto Rodríguez. Although the success of El Nuevo Círculo Dramatico was short, the spirit of the company lived on when Colón went on to found the Puerto Rican Traveling Theater Company.

== El Nuevo Círculo Dramatico ==
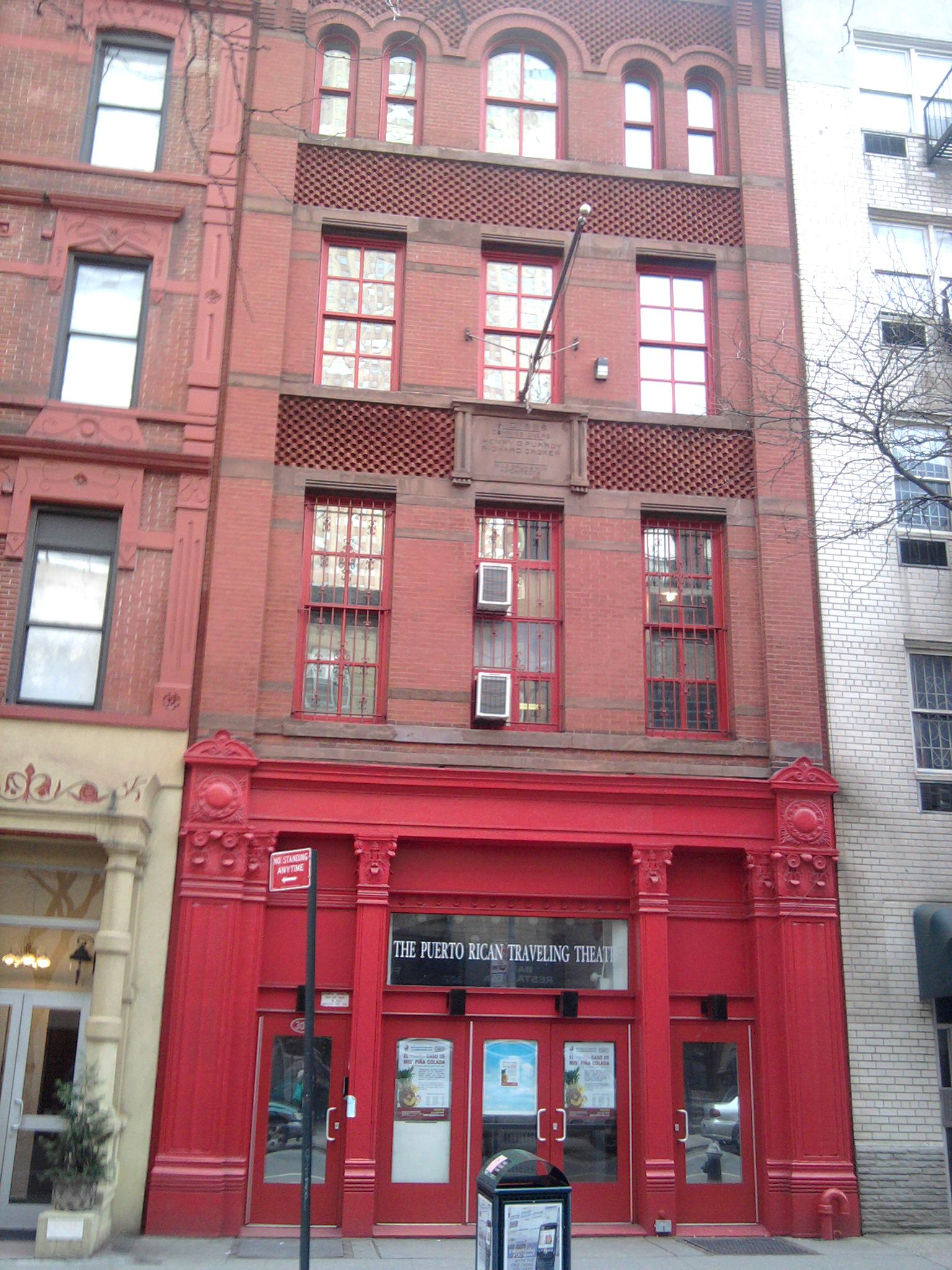
Puerto Rican Traveling Theater at the 47th Street Theatre

In the 1940s and 50s Hispanic theater waned, only surviving in mutual aid societies, church halls, and lodges for smaller audiences. In 1940, Puerto Rican dramatist René Marqués began to develop an awareness of the Puerto Rican experience in the United States while studying playwriting in New York. After returning to San Juan, he wrote the play La Carreta. The story of La Carreta dramatized a family dislocated from their farm and resettling into a slum in San Juan, and then to New York City. It resonated with many immigrant families who felt that their history, language and culture of the working class were represented in a serious dramatic form.

The play was first produced in 1953, directed by Roberto Rodríguez and starring the young actress Miriam Colón. The success of the play allowed Rodríguez and Colón to form the first permanent Hispanic theatrical group to have its own space, Teatro Arena, located in Manhattan on Sixth Avenue between 43rd and 44th street. The group was very successful at the start, allowing many important Latino/a figures to start their careers and giving Rodríguez the title as the father of modern Puerto Rican drama in the United States. However, the building was closed by the fire department in the 1960s, and the company could not survive past its fifth year of existence. Despite its short life though, it still had a huge impact on the Puerto Rican theater scene. Many new groups began to form, inspired by the success of El Nuevo Círculo Dramatico and another group, La Farándula Panamericana. Some of these groups include: El Nuevo Teatro Pobre de las Américas, Teatro Orilla, Teatro Guazabara, Teatro Jurutungo, and most notably Teatro Cuatro, which still exists to this day.

== Puerto Rican Traveling Theater Company ==
Though El Nuevo Círculo Dramatico could not continue, Colón went on to form the Puerto Rican Traveling Theater company in 1967 after starring in an off-Broadway production of The Oxcart (an English translated version of La Carreta) in 1966. The Puerto Rican Traveling Theater company (or PRTT) performed in both English and Spanish, traveling around the boroughs of New York City with the focus of bringing theater to those who desperately needed it. Supported by a joint sponsorship from Mayor Lindsay's Summer Task Force Program and the Parks Department, Colón began by touring a production of The Oxcart through various neighborhoods, often to audiences who had never seen theater before. The tours were immensely popular, drawing crowds of people. The summer tours continued for years after their start, providing free, bilingual theater to different neighborhoods in New York City. After five years, the company gained a permanent location in the Chelsea district in Manhattan until Colón was able to secure a former fire house in the heart of the Theater District, where the company still operates today.

== Pregones Theater ==
In November 2013, Bronx based Pregones Theater, founded and directed by Rosalba Rolón, and the Puerto Rican Traveling Theater Company announced plans to merge. In September 2025, Pregones/Puerto Rican Traveling Theater became part of the city's Cultural Institutions Group, a partnership of cultural and educational institutions.

== See also ==
- 47th Street Theatre – Off-Broadway theatre in Manhattan, New York
- American literature in Spanish – Spanish-language literature in the United States
- INTAR Theatre – American Hispanic theater company
- Latin American literature – Oral and written tradition
- Latino theatre in the United States
- Puerto Rican literature/theater
