= Native Country of the Heart =

2019 memoir by Cherrie Moraga

Native Country of the Heart: A Memoir
- Author: Cherrie Moraga
- Language: English
- Genre: Memoir
- Published: 2019 (Farrar, Straus and Giroux)
- Publication place: United States
- ISBN: 978-0-374-21966-6

Native Country of the Heart: A Memoir is a 2019 book by Cherríe Moraga. It is a memoir in which the central figure is her mother, Elvira, and in the process of examining Elvira's history, Moraga attempts to also tell the larger story of the Mexican American diaspora. Moraga spins her own story in relation to that of Elvira's, from her own coming of age and coming out of the closet, all the way through Elvira's eventual decline from Alzheimer's disease.

== Synopsis ==
Elvira Isabel Moraga came of age in Tijuana's golden era in the 1920s. In her childhood she worked as an itinerant agricultural worker for her father, in California. This arrangement limited her access to education, and she never made it beyond the 3rd grade, leaving her functionally illiterate in two languages. Later the family crossed the border to Mexico, in her teens, Elvira worked hat-check-and-cigarette-girl at a fancy gambling hall in Tijuana. She eventually makes her way back to Alta California where she meets and marries Joseph, a white railroad worker. Their children, James, JoAnn and Cherrie, born in east Los Angeles, grow up on the border between the suburban American dream and as members of a mixed-race family and community. Moraga describes her own difficulties coming to terms with her lesbian sexuality, and her mother's difficulty accepting it. But in the end, her mother assures her, “how could you think that there is anything in this life you could do that you wouldn’t be my daughter?”

After college, Moraga is intent on learning Spanish and connecting to her roots, spending a significant amount of time in Mexico City, to where she brings Elvira on a visit. Later, she moves to the Bay Area, has a son, and finds a long-term relationship with Celia, also a Chicana. Her older brother, however, has married and Anglo woman, and has become distant from the family. Her sister JoAnn has settled in Orange County. The shifting relationships between the siblings and the parents follow the currents of their relationships with their identities. Moraga points out that though "all of Mexico became Mestizo", in reality, most were actually native, and that aspect of their heritage was always erased in favor of the colonialist Spanish, as evidenced by Elvira's exclamation of pride upon visiting the tomb of a conquistador general named Moraga, who might actually have been distantly related to their family line.

Moraga describes Elvira as charming and capable. In their extended family, she was central to nearly one hundred relatives. Her husband, Joseph, is described as a source of disappointment who faded into the background. Nearing age 90, Elvira developed Alzheimer's disease and forgot her 52-year marriage to him. Her children, grandchildren, and extended family visited her after she was placed in a nursing facility. Moraga notes that the dementia allowed Elvira to state "soy India" (I am Indian) for the first time in her life.

== Reception ==
Kirkus Reviews calls Native Country a "moving" and "sympathetic" portrait by a queer Latina of her close, and sometimes fraught relationship with her mother, and "of Mexican-American feminism (both in mother and daughter) delivered in a poignant, beautifully written way." The Los Angeles Times review calls the memoir "bracing", and approves of the expert telling of the parallel narratives of Moraga's journey to understand herself as "Mexican, mixed-blood, queer, female, almost Indian", and her mother's story, from her childhood picking cotton in California's Imperial Valley, the glory days of Tijuana in the 1930s, and her role as wife to a "gringo" and mother to three children, all the way through her last days of struggle with Alzheimer's disease.

The NBC News review deems the book "exquisite", pointing to how Moraga's telling of Elvira's story "amplifies the need to recognize how interwoven the past is to the present, and that to understand ourselves we must locate our ancestors, who are an extension of who we are." The review concludes, "Heart-wrenching and heartwarming, Moraga’s memoir delivers new insights into the acclaimed writer’s creativity, and introduces readers to another of her significant muses." Publishers Weekly likewise concludes that " Moraga’s captivating and perceptive memoir successfully conveys her belief that “we are as much of a place as we are of a people.”

Laurie Unger Skinner, in Library Journal, writes: "This thoughtful chronicle of the love and acceptance between mother and daughter, the generational effects of the complicated cultural relations between Mexico and America, and caring for a loved one with Alzheimer's will appeal to readers interested in any or all of those subjects."
