= José Corrales =

Cuban poet and playwright (1937–2002)

- Born: October 20, 1937; Guanabacoa, Cuba
- Died: May 2002 (aged 64); New York City
- Occupations: Playwright, poet

José Corrales (October 20, 1937 – May 2002) was a Cuban poet and playwright.

== Biography ==
José Corrales was born in Guanabacoa on October 20, 1937. He performed with Francisco Morin's Prometeo theater group in Havana and wrote for Bohemia and La Gaceta de Cuba.

He left Cuba in 1964 for Mexico and settled in New York the following year. Corrales soon became active with the local Hispanic theater community, serving as literary advisor for Dumé Spanish Theatre and also working with INTAR Theatre, Centro Cultural Cubano, and the Latin American Theater Ensemble. He also directed the Spanish Drama Club at Mercy College.

Corrales authored about twenty-five plays, among them Las hetairas habaneras with Manuel Pereiras García, Un vals de Chopin, and Los tres Marios y Cuestión de santidad. His poetry appeared in various magazines and anthologies in the United States and Spain. A large part of his works remain unpublished. José Corrales died in May 2002 in New York.

== Works or publications ==
- Bulto postal. Miami, FL?: [publisher not identified]. 1976. OCLC 16319512.
- Cobijo. Madrid: H. Blume. 1979. OCLC 27406042.
- Cuestión de santidad. Princeton, N.J.: Presbyter's Peartree. 1998. OCLC 41471402.
- Dos, two plays, obras. Princeton, N.J.: Libretoas. 1998. OCLC 41471457.
- El libro de Mario D y otras ausencias. Princeton, N.J.: Libretoas. 1998. OCLC 41472234.
- El palacio de los gritos (pieza en ocho escenas). [place of publication not identified]: Liibertoas. 1992. OCLC 31295416.
- Las hambres terrestres. Princeton, N.J.: Presbyter's Peartree. 1995. OCLC 35636721.
- Las hetairas habaneras. Miami, FL?: [publisher not identified]. 1977. OCLC 16317727.
- Las hetairas habaneras : una melotragedia cubana basada en Las troyanas de Eurípides. Honolulu, Hawaii: Editorial Persona. 1988. OCLC 19096328.
- Las honradas. United States: Distributed by Kimbara Cine Cubano Inc. 2000. OCLC 244632369.
- Los trabajos de Gerión : poemas. Barcelona: [Ediciones Rondas]. 1980. OCLC 9285455.
- Nocturno de cañas bravas : obra en diez escenas sin intermedio. Princeton, N.J.: Libretoas. 1994. OCLC 32170678.
- Orlando. Princeton, N.J.: Presbyter's Peartree. 1998. OCLC 41471473.
- Razones y amarguras : poemas del que llega a los cuarenta. Hoboken: Contra Viento y Marea. 1978. OCLC 7962985.
- Soleares Con Variaciones. Madrid: Ediciones Musicales Madrid. 1964. OCLC 20834573.
- Temporal. Princeton, N.J.: Libreto(a)s. 1993. OCLC 30993849.
- The Three Marios. Princeton, N.J.: Presbyter's Peartree. 1993. OCLC 31355792.
- Walter a primera vista. Princeton, N.J.: Presbyter's Peartree. 1998. OCLC 41471622.
- When the Mailman Comes. Princeton, N.J.: Presbyter's Peartree. 1998. OCLC 41471766.
- Collection of Guitar Arrangements, Arranged by Above Composer, in UCLA's Ernie Ball Guitar Music Collection. OCLC 319968940.
