= Manuel Pereiras García =

American dramatist

- Born: 1950 (age 75–76); Cifuentes, Cuba
- Occupation: Playwright

Manuel Pereiras García (born 1950) is the author and translator of numerous plays in English and Spanish.

== Biography ==
Pereiras García was born in Cifuentes, Cuba, in 1950. His works have been performed at Mercy College, Dumé Spanish Theatre, Stonewall Repertory Theatre, Theater for the New City, and INTAR Theatre. Pereiras García has also written about the history of theater with a focus on Cuban and Spanish drama. In 1998, his complete plays were published by Presbyter's Peartree. He currently resides in New York City.

== Works or publications ==
- Pereiras García, Manuel (1993). Bebo and the band. Los Angeles: Presbyter's Peartree. OCLC 31953016.
- —— (1998). Complete Plays. Princeton, New Jersey: Presbyter's Peartree. OCLC 62313136.
- —— (1994). It Is It Is Not. Princeton, New Jersey: Presbyter's Peartree. OCLC 32149413.
- Corrales, José; —— (1977). Las hetairas habaneras. [Miami, Florida?]: [publisher not identified]. OCLC 16317727.
- Cruz, Migdalia; —— (1994). Las flores de Miriam. Princeton, New Jersey: Presbyter's Pear Tree. OCLC 32149411.
- —— (1993). Santiago. Los Angeles: Presbyter's Peartree. OCLC 31307969.
- —— (1993). Still still. Los Angeles: Libertoas. OCLC 31952901.
