= The Hungry Woman =

1995 play by Cherrie Moraga

The Hungry Woman: A Mexican Medea is a 1995 American play by Cherríe Moraga. The play was published by West End Press. It includes aspects of Coatlicue, an Aztec goddess; the play Medea by Euripides; and La Llorona.

== Plot ==
A revolution in what was the United States had created separate territories for different racial groups. One territory is now African-American, one territory is now Native American, and another is now Latino and Hispanic. Patriarchies were established and homosexuals were forced to leave many of the areas because of politically conservative counter-revolutions. The setting is a post-apocalyptic future on the border of the current United States and Aztlán, the separate nation carved out for Latinos and Hispanics as well as Native Americans. Aztlán combined elements of both cultures. Medea was exiled because of the patriarchical, anti-homosexual revolution in Aztlán.

Medea, her son Chac-Mool, and her girlfriend live in the border area, around Phoenix, Arizona. Medea's husband Jasón wants to divorce Medea and take her Chac-Mool with him back to Aztlán, where Jasón holds an important place in society.

== Characters ==
- Medea – The main character, a former revolutionary who was forced into exile. She is bisexual and feminine. She is Luna's lover, Jasón's wife, and mother to teenage son, Chac-Mool. Her character is based on Euripides' Medea.
- Jasón – Medea's husband, a biracial man who now lives in Aztlán, where he holds an important position. He wants to marry an Apache virgin girl and thus is divorcing Medea.
- Chac-Mool – Medea's son, a teenager. Chac-Mool is named after a Toltec messenger, Chacmool. Melissa Pareles of the Lambda Book Report describes him as "rebellious but trusting". At one point Medea kills Chac-Mool to prevent him from going into Aztlán. Nicole Eschen of the Theatre Journal wrote that at the end, "Chac-Mool reappears, possibly as a ghost or hallucination, to absolve and cradle Medea as she kills herself."
- Luna – Medea's girlfriend, a sculptor. She had taught Chac-Mool about history and heritage, including how to plant corn. Eschen states that Luna is not apologetic about her sexuality, and while Medea is in despair, Luna gives "the voice of reason". She is not willing to leave Medea. Eschen and Pareles both describe her as "butch". Pareles states that in the play Luna is "perhaps the most sympathetic character".
- Mama Sal – A grandmother who is a lesbian. Pareles describes Mama Sal as "the kind cynic who, despite her love for Chac-Mool and Medea, helps Luna leave Medea and Medea carry out her insane plan".
- Chihuateo – Four women who had died in childbirth. They provide a chorus.

== Production ==
By 2006 the play had received several full productions.

The Hungry Woman: A Mexican Medea has had few productions between the first 1995 production directed by Tony Kelly and the 2006 production at the Leeds Theater at Brown University.

The Brown University Production of The Hungry Woman took place at the Leeds Theater in April 2006. According to the Brown Daily Herald Review, "Though a recreation of a Greek tragedy, the play includes both humorous scenes such as a girls’ night on the town in a lesbian dance club where the ladies line-dance to a disco remix of “The Hustle” and intense scenes like Medea mourning her son in the confines of a psychiatric hospital, only to be mocked by her doctors" (Barnes).

Angelica del Valle plays Medea, highlighting the emotions behind the battle to keep her son. Luna, Medea's lover, played by Erin Adams gives a sense of romance and evokes the feeling of emotional strain that family conflict can have on a relationship.

Stanford University's production of The Hungry Woman: A Mexican Medea took place in May 2005 at the Pigott Theater. Adelina Anthony directed this production. The production included equity actors VIVIS as Medea, Tessa Koning-Martínez as Mama Sal, as well as actors Ronak Kapadia as Jasón, Misha Chowhury as Chac-Mool, and Adelina Anthony as Luna. According to Eschen's performance review, "The play, from Medea herself to the set design, carried several simultaneous meanings, resonating with various culture" (Eschen).

According to a production review by Nicole Eschen in a Theatre Journal, "The Hungry Woman furthers Moraga’s explorations of the intersection between aspects of identity, particularly as a Chicana lesbian, but also in relationship to indigenous cultures and motherhood" (Eschen). Adelina Anthony tackles Cherríe Moraga's work and attempts to display the intersection of cultures. Cultures were intertwined in this production. This was heavily seen in the set design. The set had Greek elements, with white marble and traditional architecture. Its shape "suggested a cave or natural rock setting" according to Eschen. She further mentions that "Lighting and repositioning of a small rectangular platform transformed this abstract background into various locations such as a lesbian bar and a mental hospital"(Eschen).

This production takes inspiration from Euripides' Medea, but does not mimic it, balancing "elements of the Greek story with the Mexican La Llorona and the Aztec goddess Coatlicue" (Eschen). VIVIS highlighted Medea's characterization of agony and despair. Eschen writes that VIVIS, "spent a great deal of the play wandering around the stage in a black slip with a bottle of tequila or confines in a mental institution" (Eschen). During the scene where Medea ultimately makes the decision to kill her son, there is a choreographed dance by Alleluia Panis which "combined images of birth and death culminating in a Pietà image in which Medea cradled her dead son" (Eschen).

Anthony, playing Luna, Medea's lover, both acted and co-directed the production. Anthony represented the butch lesbian lover, teaching Medea's son Chac-Mool about his heritage and history. Both Anthony and VIVIS utilized "fairly realistic, traditional Western acting styles"(Eschen). The chorus was costumed in brown body suits, "which were painted outlines of their breasts" (Eschen)., mimicking the image of tattoos. The women both danced and took on minimal roles such as a nurse, switching their costumes by adding specific identifying pieces. Jasón, "a cruel South American dictator" (Eschen), was seen as having dark skin, unshaven face, and vaguely military costume. Chac-Mool, Medea and Jasón's son, played by Misha Chowdhury represented a tall and lanky adolescent.
