= Caridad Svich =

American writer (born 1963)

- Born: July 30, 1963 (age 62); Philadelphia, Pennsylvania, U.S.
- Education: University of North Carolina, Charlotte (BFA); University of California, San Diego (MFA)
- Awards: 2012 Obie Award for Lifetime Achievement

Caridad Svich (/svɪtʃ/ SVITCH; born July 30, 1963) is an American playwright, songwriter/lyricist, translator, and editor born to Cuban-Argentine-Spanish-Croatian parents.

== Early life ==
Svich was born in Philadelphia, Pennsylvania on July 30, 1963. She is of a mixed-race background encompassing Cuban, Croatian, Argentine, and Spanish lineage. Her Argentine father, Emilio, and her Cuban mother, Aracely, both came to the United States via Yugoslavia. She spent the majority of her childhood living in New Jersey and Miami, Florida. While a third grade student at St. Gerard Majella School in Paterson, New Jersey she won first prize in a 1972 art contest for school children sponsored by the Paterson Museum.

In her youth, Svich developed an interest in writing, and at the age of 14 she decided to pursue a career as a playwright when her attempts at fiction and poetry demonstrated a proclivity towards dialogue. This initial interest in play writing was sparked by the encouragement of her junior high school English teacher who originally suggested to her that she might enjoy play writing. She saw her first professional play in New York at the age 16, and from that point penned two full length plays a year during her high school and college years. Prior to college, she relocated with her family to Charlotte, North Carolina where she attended Charlotte Country Day School during her high school years.

== University education and early plays ==
Svich earned a Bachelor of Fine Arts degree at the University of North Carolina at Charlotte (UNCC) in 1985. In her sophomore year at UNCC she won Goucher College's Open Circle Playwriting Award, a national competitive prize, for her three act play Waterfall (complete April 1982) which included both a cash prize and a staging of her play by the Goucher's drama department. In her senior year she portrayed Queen Aggravain in UNCC's production of the musical Once Upon a Mattress.

In 1985 Svich won a two year scholarship to the Professional Theatre Training Program at the University of California, San Diego (UCSD). In April 1986 her play Winter in July was staged as a part of UCSD's New Play Festival (NPF) at the Arthur Wagner Theatre with a cast led by actor Ivan G'Vera. At the 1987 NPF her play Proper Positions was performed. In her third year of the graduate playwriting program at UCSD her graduate thesis play, Brazo Gitano, was performed. It deals with both magic and Cuban-American music in a consequential fashion, and incorporates Santería beliefs. The play examines the difficulties of assimilation by the children of immigrants in America. This play was also staged at Wagner College in 1988 and was the recipient of the 1989 Stanley Drama Award.

Svich graduated with a Master of Fine Arts degree from UCSD in 1988. While a student at UCSD, she held a playwright residency at La Jolla Playhouse. In 1988 she moved to New York City (NYC) where she attended play writing workshops taught by María Irene Fornés. In 2002-2003 she was a Bunting Institute Fellow at the Harvard Radcliffe Institute.

== Playwright ==
Svich has written over forty full-length plays and fifteen translations as well as other short works. At least 15 of her plays have been published in theatre anthologies. including in Shattering the Myth: Plays by Hispanic Women (1992, Arte Público Press) and Little Festival of the Unexpected (2002, Stage & Screen). Her plays have had professional stagings in the United States, Germany, Italy, Scotland, and England, and have also been staged at numerous universities.

In her early career, Svich held a series of playwright residencies in New York; holding posts at INTAR Theatre (1988-1990), Women's Project Theater (1991, 2004, & 2007), Theatre Communications Group (NYC), the Lake Placid Institute for the Arts, and New Dramatists (NYC). Other residencies she had held during her career include ones at the Mark Taper Forum in Los Angeles, the South Coast Repertory company (1990), the Playwrights' Center in Minnesota, the Traverse Theatre in Edinburgh, Scotland (1998), and several playwright-in-residence posts an American universities, including Harvard University and the Yale School of Drama.

In March 1991 Svich's play but there are fires was staged Off-Broadway at the Judith Anderson Theatre. Her play Gleaning/Rebusca was given its premiere at Beyond Baroque Literary Arts Center in 1991, and her play Any Place but Here was staged at INTAR Theatre in 1992 with a cast that included Jessica Hecht. The latter play was subsequently performed by the Latino Chicago Theater Company in 1993 with Reggie Hayes as Tommy; at Theater for the New City in 1995; and at the Gran Teatro de La Habana in Cuba (2004).

Svich's play Alchemy of Desire/Dead Man's Blues was workshopped at the Royal Court Theater in London in 1993 and given its premiere at the Cincinnati Playhouse in the Park in 1994. The cast was led by Sheila Tousey as the widow Simone. It won the Rosenthal New Play Prize. It was subsequently performed at the Bridge Theater of the Miami Beach Woman's Club in Florida (1996), the Northern Light Theatre in Edmonton, Canada (1997), the Minneapolis Theatre Garage (1997), and the Philadelphia Fringe Festival (2003). In July 1997 her play Scar was staged in Chicago by the Strawdog Theatre Company.

In October 1999 Svich's play Prodigal Kiss was staged at the Key West Theatre Festival. This was followed by the collaborative work Stations of Desire, a piece co-written by 12 playwrights, which Svich coordinated, and which had concurrent performances in 2000 in New York, Chicago, Dallas, Providence, Minneapolis, and Denver. Some of the other participating playwrights included Neena Beber, Cusi Cram, Jorge Ignacio Cortiñas, Cándido Tirado, and Julie Hébert. Her play Iphigenia Crash Land Falls on the Neon Shell That Was Once Her Heart was workshopped at the Athens Epidaurus Festival in 2000, and subsequently staged professionally at 7 Stages Theatre in Atlanta in 2004. It re-imagined Achilles as a gay glam rocker in fishnet hose who is inflicted with AIDS. The work imbedded techno music, video feeds, and choreography into its staging with critic Wendel Brock of The Atlanta Constitution describing it as "Euripides on ecstasy".

Svich has done work as a singer-songwriter and for this reason many of her plays incorporate music. Her play Fugitive Pieces (A Play With Songs) was given its premiere at the Kitchen Dog Theater in Dallas in 2000 with a cast led by Tina Parker as Downcast Mary. It was subsequently staged at the Cleveland Public Theatre (2001) and the Hyde Park Theatre (2002). In February 2001 her play Nightwood was staged by the Buddies in Bad Times company in Toronto. Her play Begging The Eclipse was given its premiere at The Cutting Ball Theater in San Francisco as part of its 2002 New Play Festival. In April 2002 her play Perdita Gracia, based on William Shakespeare's The Winter's Tale, was premiered at Denison University (DU). The following month DU staged the premiere of a play she co-authored with Nick Philippou and Todd Cerveris, The Booth Variations, which was based on the events surrounding the Assassination of Abraham Lincoln. The work featured music by Todd's brother, Tony Award winning actor and composer Michael Ceveris, and was subsequently performed Off-Broadway at 59E59 Theaters in 2004.

In the 2002-2003 season her plays The Tropic of X and The Monster in the Garden were premiered at INTAR. Her play Magnificent Waste won the Arizona Theatre Company's National Latine Playwrights Award in 2003. It was staged the following year at the Tribeca Festival as part of a series of plays staged alongside the traditional film offerings at that festival. Her play Lucinda Caval (2007) was honored by the New Dramatists organization with the Whitfield Cook Award for New Writing. In November 2003 her play Twelve Ophelias (A Play With Broken Songs), loosely based on Hamlet, was staged at the Lowndes Shakespeare Center as part of the New Festival of Plays in Orlando. This work was later performed at the Oscar G. Brockett Theater in 2019.

In October 2004 she was one of five women playwrights who contributed short works which were staged Off-Broadway collectively as Antigone Project by Women's Project Theater. Her contribution, Antigone Arkhe, featured an archivist's lecture on Antigone juxtaposed with a dancing sculpture and an "unsettling video and a 'lost' tape of Antigone's voice".

In 2023 her play Arbor Falls was performed at Grinnell College in Iowa.

== Academic, translator, critic, and publisher ==
Svich has published extensively as a theatre critic and academic.

She sustains a parallel career as a theatrical translator, mainly of the dramatic work of Federico García Lorca. She translated Alberto Pedro Torriente's Mar Nuestro (English: Our Sea) which was staged Off-Broadway under the title Faith, Hope and Charity by INTAR in 2003. It was subsequently performed by the Greater Hartford Academy of the Arts in 2004. Her translation of Federico García Lorca's Doña Rosita la soltera, entitled Doña Rosita or the Language of Flowers, was staged at Dartmouth College in 2004.

She has received fellowships from the NEA/TCG, PEW Charitable Trust, and California Arts Council. She teaches creative writing and playwriting at Rutgers University–New Brunswick and Primary Stages’ Einhorn School of Performing Arts. She has been a visiting faculty member at Bennington College.

She has also taught playwriting at Bard College, Barnard College, Denison University, Ohio State University, ScriptWorks, and University of California, San Diego. and has taught playwriting workshops at Paines Plough Theater in London and the US-Cuba Writer's Conference in Havana. She has worked as a guest lecturer at the Yale School of Drama. She has edited many theatre anthologies.

Svich is the founder of theatre alliance and publisher NoPassport. Her work has responded to the Deepwater Horizon oil spill, veterans and their families, survivors of trauma and Latin American topics. Svich was the co-organizer and curator of After Orlando, a collection of new 3– to 5– minute plays responding to the 2016 shooting at Pulse nightclub in Orlando, Florida. Over 40 theatrical institutions and universities in the United States and other countries participated.

== Selected published works ==
=== Plays and dramatic sketches ===
- Svich, Caridad (1991), But There Are Fires, Alexandria, VA: Alexander Street Press
- Svich, Caridad (1992). Gleaning/Rebusca. Alexandria, VA: Alexander Street Press. OCLC 180772604.
- Svich, Caridad (1993). Any Place but Here. Alexandria, VA: Alexander Street Press.
- Svich, Caridad (1994), Scar, Alexandria, VA: Alexander Street Press
- Svich, Caridad (1996), Away Down Dreaming, Alexandria, VA: Alexander Street Press
- Svich, Caridad (1998), 12 Short Prayers for Life When Dying, Alexandria, VA: Alexander Street Press
- Svich, Caridad (1999). Iphigenia Crash Land Falls on the Neon Shell That Was Once Her Heart: a Rave Fable. Alexandria, VA: Alexander Street Press. OCLC 180772607.
- Svich, Caridad (1999). Prodigal Kiss. Alexandria, VA: Alexander Street Press. OCLC 180772610.
- Svich, Caridad (1999), Pensacola, Alexandria, VA: Alexander Street Press
- Svich, Caridad (1999), Torch, Alexandria, VA: Alexander Street Press
- Svich, Caridad (2000). Alchemy of Desire Dead-man's Blues. Alexandria, VA: Alexander Street Press. OCLC 180772595.
- Svich, Caridad (2000), Carnival, Alexandria, VA: Alexander Street Press
- Svich, Caridad (2000). Fugitive Pieces: A Play with Songs. Alexandria, VA: Alexander Street Press. OCLC 318240754.
- Svich, Caridad (2000), Home, Desire, Memory, Alexandria, VA: Alexander Street Press
- Svich, Caridad (2000), Nightwood, Alexandria, VA: Alexander Street Press
- Svich, Caridad (2000). Steal Back Light from the Virtual. Alexandria, VA: Alexander Street Press. OCLC 180772615.
- Svich, Caridad (2000). Turn the Dark Up, Bow Down, This Is a Hymn. Alexandria, VA: Alexander Street Press. OCLC 180772617.
- Svich, Caridad (2001), Calculating Genesis, Alexandria, VA: Alexander Street Press
- Svich, Caridad (2001), A Clear, Blue Thing, Alexandria, VA: Alexander Street Press
- Svich, Caridad (2001), In the Upper Room, Alexandria, VA: Alexander Street Press
- Svich, Caridad (2001). Slow Fast Walking on the Red Eye. Alexandria, VA: Alexander Street Press. OCLC 180772611.
- Svich, Caridad (2001). Transmission 0500 / To the Blue Peninsula. Alexandria, VA: Alexander Street Press. OCLC 180772616.
- Svich, Caridad (2001). Twelve Ophelias. Alexandria, VA: Alexander Street Press. OCLC 180772618.
- Svich, Caridad (2002), The Archaeology of Dreams, Alexandria, VA: Alexander Street Press
- Cerveris, Todd; Philippou, Nick; Svich, Caridad (2002), The Booth Variations, Alexandria, VA: Alexander Street Press
- Svich, Caridad (2002). Perdita Gracia. Alexandria, VA: Alexander Street Press. OCLC 180772609.
- Svich, Caridad (2002), Return to the Upright Position, Alexandria, VA: Alexander Street Press
- Svich, Caridad (2002). Something Simple, Plain-Spoken. Alexandria, VA: Alexander Street Press. OCLC 180772614.
- Svich, Caridad (2003), Lulu Ascending, Alexandria, VA: Alexander Street Press
- Svich, Caridad (2003), The Monster in the Garden, Alexandria, VA: Alexander Street Press
- Svich, Caridad (2003), The Tropic of X, Alexandria, VA: Alexander Street Press
- Svich, Caridad (2004), Antigone Arkhe, Alexandria, VA: Alexander Street Press
- Svich, Caridad (2004), Come Burning, Alexandria, VA: Alexander Street Press
- Svich, Caridad (2004), Finding Life, Alexandria, VA: Alexander Street Press
- Svich, Caridad (2004), Self Made: A Border Crossing, Alexandria, VA: Alexander Street Press
- Svich, Caridad (2004), A Short Time Thereafter, Alexandria, VA: Alexander Street Press
- Svich, Caridad (2004), Stealing Medea, Alexandria, VA: Alexander Street Press
- Svich, Caridad (2004), Tilt Heaven, Alexandria, VA: Alexander Street Press
- Svich, Caridad (2004), Torn Limb, Alexandria, VA: Alexander Street Press
- Svich, Caridad (2004), Transient Animations, Alexandria, VA: Alexander Street Press
- Svich, Caridad (2004), Wreckage, Alexandria, VA: Alexander Street Press
- Svich, Caridad (2005), Genuine Bonafide Article, Alexandria, VA: Alexander Street Press
- Svich, Caridad (2005). Luna Park. Alexandria, VA: Alexander Street Press. OCLC 268790129.
- Svich, Caridad (2005), The Spell of Eden, Alexandria, VA: Alexander Street Press
- Svich, Caridad (2005), Wariswar, Alexandria, VA: Alexander Street Press
- Svich, Caridad (2006), The Labyrinth of Desire, Alexandria, VA: Alexander Street Press
- Svich, Caridad (2006), A Little Betrayal Among Friends, Alexandria, VA: Alexander Street Press
- Svich, Caridad (2006), Magnificent Waste, Alexandria, VA: Alexander Street Press
- Svich, Caridad (2007), Verbatim, Alexandria, VA: Alexander Street Press

=== Books ===
- Delgado, Maria M.; Svich, Caridad, eds. (1999). Conducting a Life: Reflections on the Theatre of Maria Irene Fornes. Lyme, NH: Smith & Kraus. ISBN 9781575252049. OCLC 42592806.
- Svich, Caridad; Marrero, María Teresa, eds. (2000). Out of the Fringe: Contemporary Latina/Latino Theatre and Performance. New York: Theatre Communications Group. ISBN 978-1559361712. OCLC 42397219.
- García Lorca, Federico (2000). Federico García Lorca: Impossible Theater: Five Plays and Thirteen Poems. Translated by Caridad Svich. Hanover, N.H.: Smith and Kraus. ISBN 9781575252285. OCLC 44391687.
- Delgado, Maria M.; Svich, Caridad, eds. (2002). Theatre in Crisis?: Performance Manifestos for a New Century. Manchester, UK: Manchester University Press. ISBN 9780719062902. OCLC 50102041.
- Svich, Caridad, ed. (2003). Trans-global Readings: Crossing Theatrical Boundaries. Manchester, UK: Manchester University Press. ISBN 9780719063244. OCLC 53389407.
- Svich, Caridad, ed. (2005). Divine Fire: Eight Contemporary Plays Inspired by the Greeks. New York: Back Stage Books. ISBN 9780823008858. OCLC 61724907.
- Caridad, Svich (2012). "A Body of Remembrance: Chiori Miyagawa's Theatre". Thousand Years Waiting and Other Plays. By Miyagawa, Chiori. Seagull Books. ISBN 9780857420206.
- Svich, Caridad (2014). Instructions for Breathing and Other Plays. Seagull Books. ISBN 9780857421111. (contains the plays Steal Back Light From the Virtual, Rift, Thrush, Luna Park, Wreckage, Fugitive Pieces and Instructions for Breathing)

=== Journal articles ===
- Svich, Caridad (2000). "Dancing in Place". PAJ: A Journal of Performance and Art. 22 (3): 72–76. doi:10.2307/3247843. JSTOR 3247843.
- Svich, Caridad (2004). "[Review of Defiant Acts: Four Plays by Diana Raznovich/Actos desafiantes: cuatro obras de Diana Raznovich, by D. Taylor, V. Martínez, L. Ramírez, & N. Glickman]". The Modern Language Review. 99 (2): 524–25. doi:10.2307/3738823. JSTOR 3738823.
- Grote, Jason; Svich, Caridad; Washburn, Anne; Urban, Ken (2006). "Contemporary American Playwriting: The Issue of Legacy". PAJ: A Journal of Performance and Art. 28 (3): 11–22. doi:10.1162/pajj.2006.28.3.11. JSTOR 4140007.
- Svich, Caridad (2007). "Some Thoughts on García Lorca and the Arts of Translation". Theatre Journal. 59 (3): 377–379. doi:10.1353/tj.2007.0172. JSTOR 25070061 – via JSTOR.
- Grieg, David; Svich, Caridad (2007). "Physical Poetry". PAJ: A Journal of Performance and Art. 29 (2): 51–58. doi:10.1162/pajj.2007.29.2.51. JSTOR 4140026 – via JSTOR.
- Svich, Caridad (2008). "Ordinary Sites of Transgression". PAJ: A Journal of Performance and Art. 30 (2): 88–92. doi:10.1162/pajj.2008.30.2.88. JSTOR 30133345 – via JSTOR.
- Svich, Caridad; Berman, Brooke; Cruz, Migdalia; Hébert, Julie; García-Romero, Anne; Maisel, Jennifer; Mayer, Oliver (2009). "The Legacy of Maria Irene Fornes: A Collection of Impressions and Exercises". PAJ: A Journal of Performance and Art. 31 (3): 1–32. doi:10.1162/pajj.2009.31.3.1. JSTOR 20627931 – via JSTOR.
- Svich, Caridad (2010). "A Dream of Making". Theatre Journal. 62 (4): 511–14. doi:10.1353/tj.2010.a413920. JSTOR 41000789 – via JSTOR.
- Svich, Caridad (2019). "Churchill's Vision". PAJ: A Journal of Performance and Art. 41 (2): 41–43. doi:10.1162/pajj_a_00468. JSTOR 26729220 – via JSTOR.

== Awards ==
- 2012 Obie Award for Lifetime Achievement
