= El Hombre Y Sus Sueños =

1946 Puerto Rican play by René Marqués

El Hombre Y Sus Sueños (English: The man and his dreams) is a 1946 play by Puerto Rican playwright René Marqués. The story takes place in the room of a dying man—El hombre—who is perceived to be asleep and almost dead by the people who come and go from his room, discussing who he was and what legacy he would leave behind. Through the shadow characters, Marqués demonstrates that immortality is not achieved in flesh or in religion. As he does in the majority of his work, Marqués comments on society's need to leave a legacy, as well as other problems, in the play. Themes include the following: polarizing right and wrong, color symbolism, paths to immortality, egotism, death, legacy, time, and more. The central theme in René Marquez's work is his concern for the political fate of his country, as well as his love for the country, culture and traditions

== Characters ==
- El Hombre (The Man) - The dying man
- El Hijo (The Son) - The son of the dying man and the lover of La Mujer
- La Mujer (The Woman) - The dying man's second wife and the son's lover
- La Enfermera (The Nurse) - The nurse taking care of the dying man.
- La Criada (The Maid) - The maid concerned with the dying man's spirituality.
- El Amigo Político (The Politician Friend) - The politician friend of the dying man
- El Amigo Poeta (The Poet Friend) - The poet friend of the dying man
- El Amigo Filósofo (The Philosopher Friend) - The philosopher friend of the dying man
- El Sacerdote (The Priest) - The priest that prays in the room for the dying man.
- El Criado (The Male Servant) - The male servant
- La Sombra Roja (The Red Shadow)
- La Sombra Negra (The Black Shadow)
- La Sombra Azul (The Blue Shadow)

== Synopsis ==
A dying man is lying in a bed when three of his friends, Amigo Político (a politician), Amigo Poeta (a poet), and Amigo Filósofo (a philosopher) are led into the bedroom by El Criado (a male servant). In their time in the room, they discuss which of them has the most irrelevant profession and how El Hombre's death will benefit or harm them individually. In front of the dying man, they continue their selfish discussion about him, his "greatness", and his influence.

We later learn that the son has been the lover of El Hombre's second wife, La Mujer, and is aggressively pursuing La Enfermera as well——all out of insecurity from living in the shadow of his father. However, actual shadows, invisible to the other characters, begin to appear in the bedroom, each symbolizing a different aspect of the dying man: the Red Shadow symbolizes his flesh as well as his bloodline, the Black Shadow symbolizes his spirituality and soul, and the Blue Shadow symbolizes the power of immortality within his greatness.

El Hombre eventually fulfills his quest for immortality through his works, after dying at the end. Upon his death, La Mujer rejoices that she is finally "free," El Hijo continues feeling insecure and alone, and La Enfermera finally gives in to El Hijo's advances.

The setting of the play literally translates to "Spain, Italy, France, who cares?", and the time is "Today". In this way Marqués argues that his characters and their concerns basically apply to every (modern) place and (modern) time. Marqués comments on literature, philosophy, and politics and their limits and pretensions, each failing to have as much probative power as it claims. El Hijo, La Mujer, and La Enferma allow him to explore the workings of greed, lust, and immaturity. Marqués also examines the desire to leave something great behind, argues that this desire is much more universal than many people are willing to see, and shows that even the greatest men cannot ever be truly immortal, either alive, lauded, and in the flesh, or dead, memorialized, and seemingly part of some spiritual realm.

== Themes ==
- Polarizing right and wrong
- Color symbolism
- Paths to immortality
- Egotism
- Death
- Legacy
- Time
- Greed
- Lust
- Father/Son relationships
- Spirituality
- Philosophy
- Politics
- Intellect

== Context ==
Puerto Rico was a Spanish colony. After the Spanish-American War (1898), Puerto Rico was ceded to the United States. Now, Puerto Rico is a commonwealth of the United States, a territory with neither statehood nor independence. In the 1950s, many Puerto Rican migrants moved to the mainland United States.

After the 1940s, the United States started providing infrastructure to make Puerto Rico industrial. Marqués, as a member of the Nationalist Party, opposed the United States' involvement in Puerto Rico in this way. In his work, Marqués often commented about the U.S. colonization and control of Puerto Rico in all its aspects. As scholar Eleanor J. Martin puts it, "Marqués views submission to United States domination as a forfeiture of political sovereignty for economic gain".
