= Rosalba Rolón =

Puerto Rican actor and director (b. 1951)

- Born: August 25, 1951 (age 75); Comerío, Puerto Rico
- Occupation: Director of Pregones/PRTT
- Spouse: Alvan Colón
- Children: Rosal Colón

Rosalba Rolón (born 25 August 1951) is a Puerto Rican actress and director who is known for being the founder and current artistic director of the Pregones Theater Company, a Bronx-based touring company that focuses on Latinx stories.

== Early life and education ==
Rosalba Rolón was born in 1951, in Comerío, Puerto Rico, a small town neighboring San Juan. From a young age, she was exposed to arts through her parents, who took her to theater productions, as well as her aunt, who wrote poetry and taught literature. She also attended ballet, Spanish dance classes, and accordion lessons. Through a government initiative, Arte en la Communidad, she became involved in the arts at school. In middle school, Rolón's family moved to San Juan, and by 9th grade she was active in theater and dance classes. During high school, she won the award for best actress along with a scholarship toward her first year of college. She majored in psychology, and completed both her bachelor's and master's degrees in the field.

In 1973, Rolón moved to New York with her first husband. She worked as a social worker and took theater classes to fill the gaps in her formal education. Where the Clemente Soto Velez Cultural and Educational Center stands today was then a group of artists' studios. Rolón attended workshops there, beginning in 1977. Her teacher at the studio recommended she attend workshops at the Alvin Ailey American Dance Theater. She studied there for a year and a half under Nat Horne. She devoted increasingly more time to theater, taking classes and auditioning, and found a part-time job with the Association of Hispanic Arts (AHA). By age 27, she was divorced and had committed to doing theater full-time.

== Career ==
In her mid 20s, Rolón landed a number of roles with Latino theaters in New York, including Porton and Thalia, and was doing voiceovers on the side. By 1978, she was still working part-time with the AHA and had additionally found a job as an adjunct professor at Lehman College. However, creatively, she began looking to branch out and start something on her own. She was immersed in political discourse and aware of the tradition of Teatro Popular, or street theater, and Teatro Campesino, and so began to think about making theater in those traditions. In collaboration with a friend, she began a project to take stock of 100 years of Puerto Rican theater, from 1878 to 1978. After researching and reading numerous plays, they narrowed it down to nine plays, spanning different decades. After rehearsing in friends' offices, they had their first reading in a friend's bedroom for an audience of 10 people. This was the beginning of the Pregones Theater Company. Since then, Pregones has produced more than 80 pieces, 37 of which Rolón has worked on.

=== Pregones Theater Company ===
Pregones Theater Company is a Bronx-based touring company that focuses on expanding arts opportunities to Latinx theater artists.

==== History ====
After their first small performance, Rolón invested in starting their own theater company. She, along with Luis Meléndez and David Crommett, began to work seriously to produce the play collection, or La Colleción, that they had created. They rehearsed wherever they could find space and performed all over New York and the surrounding states, including small towns and prisons. According to Rolón, they were in Philadelphia so much they received an award reserved for local artists.

The initial impetus behind the Pregones Theater Company was to create collective productions and bring them to people outside the mainstream theater community. To this end, they chose productions for their repertoire that would require minimal staging. As the company grew to include more actors and musicians, they decided they needed a more formal rehearsal space. By that time, they had been working with a number of Bronx organizations for more than a year, and when given the opportunity to use an office space there they jumped at the chance to settle down. By 1985, the company was rehearsing in their office rooms and performing in St. Ann's church in a room they had renovated from a gym into a theater space. While there they produced many works, including Areyto de Pescadores (1982), High Noon/Al Mediodía (1983), Migrants!: Cantata a los emigrantes (1985), The Caravan (1986), and Voices of Steel (1990). During the 1990s, the company grew and began many outreach programs, including the Visiting Artists Series, the Pregones Summer Stage, and curriculum development sessions, as well as collaborations with other theaters throughout NYC and around the world. As the company grew, so too did their need for a larger space. In the late 1990s, they relocated to The Studio and in 2005, they found their permanent home in a warehouse they renovated with the help of a $2.7 million capital campaign.

==== Structure ====
The company has been a collective project since its inception. There are three directors, including Rolón, a music director, and a collective of actors. Some pieces are more director-driven than others, but all include cooperative elements, and most are musical, necessitating that the music director be a co-director.

==== Accomplishments ====
Pregones Theater Company has performed in over 400 cities in 13 different countries, although their main focus is the Tri-State area, and they have nearly 70 premiers to their credit. The company has partnerships with many different theater companies, including the Roadside Theater in Kentucky, The Yuyachkani Collective in Peru, and the Worldwide Virtual Theater Carrousel cohort in Peru, Belgium, South Africa, and Slovakia, among others. They have received a number of different awards, including the leading national ensemble theater designation from the Doris Duke Charitable Foundation, the Primary Cultural Institution Designation from the New York State Council of the Arts, the New York State Governor's Arts Award, and the Culture and Humanities Award from the Center for Puerto Rican Studies.

==== Merger with the Puerto Rican Traveling Theatre ====
In 2016, Pregones completed a merger with the Puerto Rican Traveling Theater (PRTT) in order to expand the reach of both of their programming. The theaters now function as one institution, although they retain their previous names. Since the early 2000s, the two theaters have done many collaborations and co-productions, and Rolón worked extensively with the founder and director of PRTT, Miriam Colón.

=== Projects and collaborations ===
- 21 Islands International Short Film Fest (Dec. 9-11, 2016)
- Elders Share The Arts (ESTA)
- New York Shakespeare's Festival Latino
- Teatrofestival

== Awards and recognition ==
- 2008: USA Fontanals Fellow
- 2008: El Diario La Prensa Outstanding Woman of the Year
- 2009: United States Artists (USA) board of directors
- 2010: Bronx Influential Women
- 2011: APPLAUSE award, Bronx Council on the Arts
- 2018: Doris Duke Artist Award
- 2025: The Dorothy and Lillian Gish Prize
