= Míriam Colón =

Native Puerto Rican actress (died 2017)

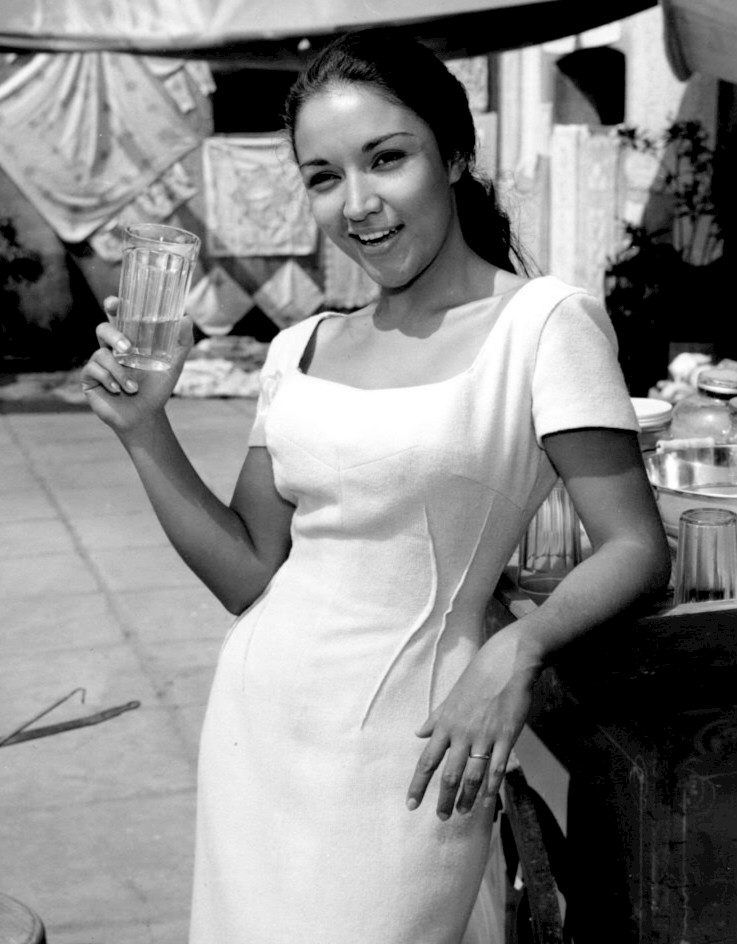
- Colón in 1962
- Born: Míriam Colón y Quiles; September 5, 1930; Ponce, Puerto Rico
- Died: March 3, 2017 (aged 86); New York City, U.S.
- Occupation: Actress
- Years active: 1951–2015
- Known for: Mama Montana – Scarface (1983)
- Spouses: George Paul Edgar (m. 1966; died 1976) Fred Valle (m. 1987–2017)

Míriam Colón Valle (née Colón y Quiles; September 5, 1930 – March 3, 2017) was a Puerto Rican actress. She was the founder and director of New York City's Puerto Rican Traveling Theater. Beginning her career in the early 1950s, she performed on Broadway and on television. She appeared in several Hollywood films including The Appaloosa, The Possession of Joel Delaney, Backroads, Gloria and Lone Star and One-Eyed Jacks.

Colon appeared on television programs from the 1960s to the 2010s, including Sanford and Son and Gunsmoke. She is best known as "Mama Montana", the mother of Al Pacino's title character in Scarface. In 2014, she received the National Medal of Arts from President Barack Obama. In 1993, Colón received the Obie award for her theatre career, she also received several ACE awards. She died of complications from a pulmonary infection on March 3, 2017.

== Early life ==
Míriam (or Mírian) Colón y Quiles was born in Ponce, Puerto Rico to Native Puerto Rican parents, Teodoro Colón De Jesus and Josefa Quiles Burgos, a seamstress. In the 1940s, her parents divorced, and her mother moved the family to a public housing project called Residencial Las Casas in San Juan. She was an admirer of accomplished Puerto Rican actor José Ferrer.

Colón attended Román Baldorioty de Castro High School in Old San Juan, where she took part in plays. She discovered her interest in theater while performing in a school rendition of La Azotea at the age of 15. Her first drama teacher, Marcos Colón (no relation) believed in her talent, and helped her gain permission to observe the students in the drama department of the University of Puerto Rico (UPR). She was a good student in high school and was awarded scholarships to the Dramatic Workshop and Technical Institute and Lee Strasberg's Actors Studio in New York City. In New York, she befriended Dean Zayas, another young Puerto Rican actor and future director.

== Career ==
External audio
- Colón's debut in "Los Peloteros" on YouTube

In 1951, Colón debuted as "Lolita" in Los Peloteros (The Baseball Players), a film produced by the Puerto Rican Division of Community Education (DIVEDCO) and starring Ramón "Diplo" Rivero.

Colón travelled to New York at the age of 18 along her mother. There she met a Puerto Rican director named Roberto Rodríguez Suárez, who gave him a script for an adaptation of René Márquez's La Carreta. The play debuted in a local church, with the author in attendance.

She was accepted by Actors Studio co-founder Elia Kazan in 1953. She was the studio's first Puerto Rican member.

In New York, she worked in theater and later landed a role on the soap opera Guiding Light. She attended a performance of René Marqués' La Carreta (The Oxcart). She was inspired to form the first Hispanic theater group, with the help of La Carreta's producer, Roberto Rodrígue. It was called "El Nuevo Círculo Dramatico".

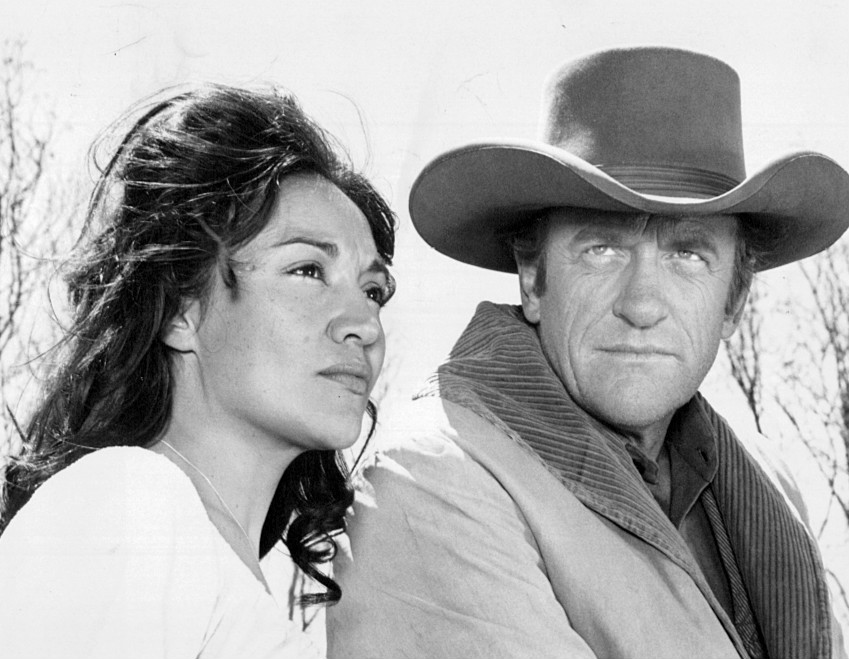
Colón and James Arness in Gunsmoke, 1970

In 1954, she appeared on stage in "In The Summer House" at the Play House in New York City.

Between 1954 and 1974, she made guest appearances in television shows such as Peter Gunn and Alfred Hitchcock Presents. She appeared mostly in westerns such as Gunsmoke, Bonanza, The High Chaparral, and Have Gun, Will Travel. She appeared in the 1961 film One-eyed Jacks as "the Redhead". For her audition, Marlon Brando requested that she improvised instead of reading the script. She also worked with Brando in The Appaloosa and gained respect for him.

In 1962, she was featured as the co-star in a teleplay written by Frank Gabrielsen, and produced for the TV series The DuPont Show of the Week. The title of the hour-long episode is "The Richest Man in Bogota", airing on June 17, 1962. It starred Lee Marvin as Juan de Núñez, and Miriam Colón as "Marina". (Her character was called Medina-Saroté in the original H.G. Wells story, The Country of the Blind).

She co-starred as Anita Chavez in the film Thunder Island (1963). That year she also guest starred on Gunsmoke, playing a Comanche woman who marries a white settler. The pair must deal with discrimination and the racial hatred of others in this episode, entitled “Shona” (S8E22). In 1966, Colón sponsored a translation of La Carreta along then-husband George P. Edgar. A young Raúl Juliá attendee the auditions, later starring along Lucy Boscana in the play directed by Lloyd Richards.

Colón has appeared in Puerto Rican productions, including the mini-series El Callejón de los Cuernos. In 1979, she starred alongside fellow Puerto Rican actors José Ferrer, Raúl Juliá, and Henry Darrow in Life of Sin. She portrayed Isabel la Negra, an historic Puerto Rican brothel owner. In 1983, she was cast as the mother of Tony Montana in Scarface. Colón has said that she based her performance on her own mother. She was cast as María in the 1999 film Gloria, starring Sharon Stone.

She continued to perform on stage and appeared in several plays including Las Troyanas, La Casa de Bernarda Alba and Floating Alba. Her television career continued with appearances in Dr. Kildare, LA Law and NYPD Blue.

In 2013, she was cast in the role of Ultima, a New Mexico Hispanic healer, in the movie Bless Me, Ultima, based on the novel by Rudolfo Anaya. She appeared in Season 1 of the TV series Better Call Saul in 2015, as Abuelita.

== Puerto Rican Traveling Theater ==
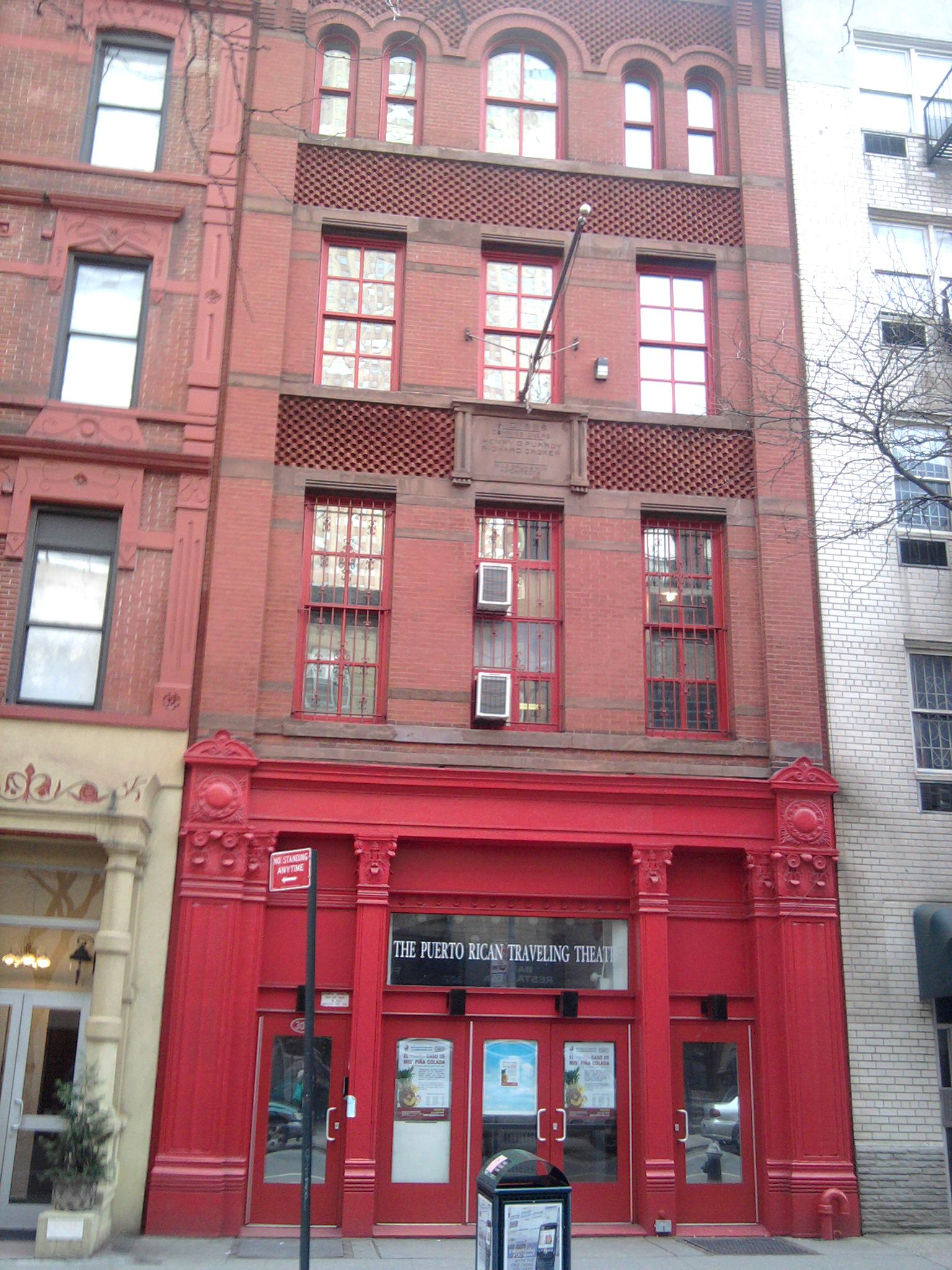
Puerto Rican Traveling Theater

In the late 1960s, Colón founded The Puerto Rican Traveling Theater company on West 47th street in Manhattan, New York. The company presents Off-Broadway productions onsite and also goes on tour. During her tenure, PRTT focused on Puerto Rican plays. She was the director of the company and she appeared in the following PRTT productions:

- The Ox Cart (1966–1967)
- The Boiler Room (1993)
- Simpson Street
- Señora Carrar's Rifles

The play The Ox Cart (La Carreta), written by Puerto Rican dramatist René Marqués, was first produced in 1953. It was directed by Roberto Rodríguez and starred Colón. The success of the play allowed Rodríguez and Colón to form the first permanent Hispanic theatrical group, and for the group to have its own space, Teatro Arena, located in Manhattan on Sixth Avenue between 43rd and 44th street.

== Recognition ==
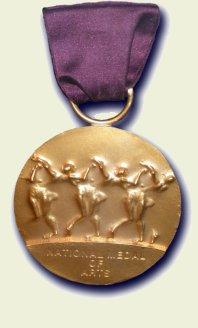
National Medal of Arts

In 1993, Colón received an Obie Award for Lifetime Achievement in the Theater. In 2000, she received the HOLA Raúl Juliá Founders Award, presented by the Hispanic Organization of Latin Actors (HOLA). Colón's biography, Míriam Colón: Actor and Theater Founder, was written by Mayra Fernandez in 1994. In 2014, President Barack Obama awarded Colón the National Medal of Arts for her contributions as an actress. The citation reads as follows: "Ms. Colón has been a trailblazer in film, television, and theater, and helped open doors for generations of Hispanic actors."

== Personal life ==
Colón was married to George Paul Edgar from 1966 until his death in 1976. In 1987, she married actor and physician Freddy Valle, with whom she continued living at New York.

She was an avid collector of ancestral arts including pre-Columbian, historic Native American, tribal African, and other tribal art. She collected Mid-East artifacts, abstract paintings, and modern sculpture. A Pablo Picasso sketch she owned, she signed with a crayon, and it was auctioned for $6500 on June 16, 2019. At her death, she owned at least six signed movie posters of Al Pacino's Scarface and at least seven signed Scarface soundtrack albums.

== Death ==
Colón died on March 3, 2017, in New York City from complications from a pulmonary infection. Among those who paid tribute to her were Rosalba Rolón, Marc Anthony (whom she had coached as an actor and briefly appeared with on television), and Lin-Manuel Miranda.

== Filmography ==
- 1951 Los Peloteros as Lolita
- 1955 Danger (TV series) (Season 5 Episode 20: "No Passport for Death")
- 1955 Star Tonight (TV series) (Season 1 Episode 28: "The Ring of General Maclas")
- 1956 Crowded Paradise
- 1956 Soraya (TV series) (60 episodes)
- 1956–1958 Studio One (TV series)
  - (Season 8 Episode 38: "Flight") (1956) as Rosie
  - (Season 10 Episode 42: "Tag-Along") (1958) as Mrs. Talavera
- 1957 The Big Story (TV series) (Season 8 Episode 14: "House Divided") as Esperanza Martinez
- 1958 Decoy (TV series) (Season 1 Episode 32: "Fiesta at Midnight") as Maria
- 1958 Playhouse 90 (TV series) (Season 2 Episode 38: "A Town Has Turned to Dust") as Dolores
- 1959 Lux Playhouse (TV series) (Season 1 Episode 13: "The Dreamer") as Mrs. Flores
- 1959 State Trooper (TV series) (Season 3 Episode 7: "Case of the Barefoot Girl") as Francesca
- 1959 One Step Beyond (TV series) (Season 2 Episode 15: "The Hand") as Alma Rodriguez
- 1959 Markham (TV series) (Season 1 Episode 2: "Woman of Arles") as Esperanza
- 1959 Mike Hammer (TV series) (Season 2 Episode 23: "See No Evil") as Tarano
- 1959 Peter Gunn (TV series) (Season 1 Episode 37: "The Coffin") as Maria DeCara
- 1959 Tales of Wells Fargo (TV series) (Season 4 Episode 2: "Desert Showdown") as Rita
- 1959 Wanted Dead or Alive (TV series) (Season 2 Episode 11: "Desert Seed") as Mrs. Gomez
- 1961 One-Eyed Jacks as Redheaded Lady
- 1961 Battle at Bloody Beach as Nahni
- 1961 The Outsider as Anita
- 1962 Alfred Hitchcock Presents (TV series) (Season 7 Episode 19: "Strange Miracle") as Lolla Siqueras
- 1962 The New Breed (TV series) (Season 1 Episode 31: "My Brother's Keeper") as Dolores Madero
- 1962 The DuPont Show of the Week (TV series) (Season 1 Episode 28: The Richest Man in Bogota as Marina
- 1962 Dr. Kildare (TV series) (2 episodes)
  - (Season 1 Episode 19: "The Glory Hunter") as Rani Stewart
  - (Season 2 Episode 8: "The Cobweb Chain") as Pila
- 1962 The Defenders (TV series) (Season 2 Episode 12: "The Savage Infant") as Carmella Lopez
- 1962–1974 Gunsmoke (TV series) (8 episodes)
  - (Season 7 Episode 21: "He Learned About Women") (1962) as Kisla
  - (Season 8 Episode 22: "Shona") (1963) as Shona
  - (Season 14 Episode 3: "Zavala") (1968) as Amelita Avila
  - (Season 15 Episode 7: "Charlie Noon") (1969) as Woman
  - (Season 16 Episode 1: "Chato") (1970) as Mora
  - (Season 18 Episode 1: "The River: Part 1") (1972) as Paulette Duvalier
  - (Season 18 Episode 2: "The River: Part 2") (1972) as Paulette Duvalier
  - (Season 19 Episode 19: "The Iron Blood of Courage") (1974) as Mignon Anderson
- 1963 Have Gun – Will Travel (TV series) (Season 6 Episode 24: "Caravan") as Punya
- 1963 Laramie (TV series) (Season 4 Episode 23: "The Unvanquished") as Winema
- 1963 Death Valley Days (TV series) (Season 11 Episode 22: "Phantom Procession") as Maria
- 1963 Harbor Lights as Gina Rosario
- 1963 Ben Casey (TV series) (Season 3 Episode 2: "Justice to a Microbe") as Eva Rosario
- 1963 The Great Adventure (TV series) (2 episodes) as Sarah Crow
  - (Season 1 Episode 2: "The Death of Sitting Bull")
  - (Season 1 Episode 3: "The Massacre at Wounded Knee")
- 1963 Thunder Island as Anita Chavez
- 1963 The Dick Van Dyke Show (TV series) (Season 3 Episode 11: "Turtles, Ties, and Toreadors") as Maria
- 1964 The Nurses (TV series) (Season 2 Episode 19: "Is There Room for Edward?") as Maria Marissa
- 1964 Slattery's People (TV series) (Season 1 Episode 6: "Question: "What Became of the White Tortilla?") as Elena Delgado
- 1966 The Legend of Jesse James (TV series) (Season 1 Episode 16: "The Empty Town") as Theresa
- 1966 The Appaloosa as Ana
- 1967 N.Y.P.D. (TV series) (Season 1 Episode 22: "Macho") as Teresa
- 1967 The Fugitive (TV series) (Season 4 Episode 24: "The Savage Street") as Mercedes Anza
- 1967 The Virginian (TV series) (Season 6 Episode 1: "The Reckoning") as Eva Talbot
- 1967 Christmas in the Marketplace (TV movie) as Virgin Mary / Mercedes
- 1968 The High Chaparral (TV series) (Season 2 Episode 3: "Follow Your Heart") as Trinidad 'Trini' Butler
- 1969 The Desperate Mission (TV movie) as Claudina, Otilia's Servant
- 1969 Bonanza (TV series) (Season 11 Episode 6: "To Stop a War") as Anita Lavez
- 1971 They Call It Murder (TV movie) as Anita Nogales
- 1972 The Possession of Joel Delaney as Veronica
- 1974 Dr. Max (TV movie) as Mrs. Camacho
- 1974 Sanford & Son (TV series) (Season 4 Episode 10: "Julio and Sister and Nephew") as Carlotta
- 1976 The Hemingway Play (TV movie)
- 1979 A Life of Sin as Isabel
- 1980 The Edge of Night (TV soap opera) (8 episodes) as Dr. Marie Santos
  - (Episode 6247) (uncredited)
  - (Episode 6248) (uncredited)
  - (Episode 6249)
  - (Episode 6251) (uncredited)
  - (Episode 6254) (uncredited)
  - (Episode 6255) (credit only)
  - (Episode 6256) (credit only)
  - (Episode 6258)
- 1981 Back Roads as Angel
- 1981 ABC Afterschool Specials (TV series) (Season 10 Episode 2: "Starstruck") as Yolanda
- 1983 Scarface (1983) as Mama Georgina Montana
- 1984 Best Kept Secret (TV movie) as Ina Dietz
- 1985 Lady Blue (TV series) (Season 1 Episode 7: "Portrait of Death") as Dona Maria
- 1986 Kay O'Brien (TV series) (Season 1 Episode 8: "Dollars and Sense") as Mrs. Amaro
- 1987 Highway to Heaven (TV series) (Season 4 Episode 4: "The People Next Door") as Anna Martinez
- 1988 Deadline: Madrid (TV movie)
- 1989–2002 Guiding Light (TV soap opera) (4 episodes)
  - (Episode dated January 18, 1989) as Mother Superior
  - (Episode dated September 4, 2001) as Maria Santos
  - (Episode dated Thursday, January 3, 2002) as Maria Santos (uncredited)
  - (Episode dated Monday, January 16, 2002) as Maria Santos (credit only)
- 1991 L.A. Law (TV series) (Season 5 Episode 14: "The Gods Must Be Lawyers") as Gaby Sifuentes
- 1991 Law and Order (TV series) (Season 1 Episode 18: "The Secret Sharers") as Mrs. Anna Rivers
- 1991 Lightning Field (TV movie)
- 1991 City of Hope as Mrs. Ramirez
- 1992 Murder, She Wrote (TV series) (Season 8 Episode 19: "Day of the Dead") as Consuela Montejano
- 1993 The House of the Spirits as Nana
- 1994 The Cosby Mysteries (TV series) (Season 1 Episode 4: "Only You")
- 1994 NYPD Blue (TV series) (Season 2 Episode 8: "You Bet Your Life") as Valeria Santiago
- 1995 Streets of Laredo (TV miniseries) (3 episodes) as Estrella
  - (Season 1 Episode 1)
  - (Season 1 Episode 2)
  - (Season 1 Episode 3)
- 1995 Sabrina as Rosa
- 1995 All My Children (TV soap opera) as Lydia Flores
- 1996 Edipo alcalde as Deyanira
- 1996 Lone Star as Mercedes Cruz
- 1996 Mistrial (TV movie) as Mrs. Cruz
- 1996 Cosby (TV series) (Season 1 Episode 8: "The Two Mr. Lucases") as Lillian
- 1996–1997 One Life to Live (TV soap opera) as Maria 'Abuelita' Delgado
- 1999 Gloria as María
- 2000 For Love or Country: The Arturo Sandoval Story (TV movie) as Cirita Sandoval
- 2000 All the Pretty Horses as Doña Alfonsa
- 2001 Third Watch (TV series) (2 episodes) as Theresa Caffey
  - (Season 2 Episode 15: "Requiem for a Bantamweight")
  - (Season 2 Episode 16: "Unfinished Business")
- 2001 The Blue Diner as Meche
- 2001 Almost a Woman (TV movie) as Tata
- 2005 Jonny Zero (TV series) (2 episodes) as Lupe
  - (Season 1 Episode 1: "Pilot")
  - (Season 1 Episode 4: "Who's Your Daddy")
- 2005 Goal! as Mercedes
- 2007 Goal! 2: Living the Dream... as Mercedes
- 2007 The Cry as Gloria The Curandera
- 2009 Law & Order: Special Victims Unit (TV series) (Season 10 Episode 19: "Selfish") as Yolanda
- 2009 Goal! 3: Taking on the World as Mercedes (uncredited)
- 2010–2011 How to Make It in America (TV series) (6 episodes) as Cam's Grandma
  - (Season 1 Episode 1: "Pilot") (2010)
  - (Season 1 Episode 2: "Crisp") (2010)
  - (Season 1 Episode 5: "Big in Japan") (2010)
  - (Season 1 Episode 8: "Never Say Die") (2010)
  - (Season 2 Episode 1: "I'm Good") (2011)
  - (Season 2 Episode 7: "The Friction") (2011)
- 2011 Gun Hill Road as Gloria
- 2011 The Bay (TV series) (Episode: "Far from the Bay: Part 1") as Grandma Andrews
- 2011 Hawthorne (TV series) (2 episodes) as Mama Renata
  - (Season 3 Episode 3: "Parental Guidance Required")
  - (Season 3 Episode 6: "Just Between Friends")
- 2011 Foreverland as Esperanza
- 2013 Bless Me, Ultima as Ultima
- 2013 Unhallowed as Bruja (rumored)
- 2014 Top Five as Chelsea's Grandmother
- 2014 On Painted Wings (not distributed) as Manuela
- 2015 Better Call Saul (TV series) (2 episodes) as Abuelita Salamanca
  - (Season 1 Episode 1: "Uno")
  - (Season 1 Episode 2: "Mijo")
- 2015 The Girl Is in Trouble as Grandma
- 2015 The Southside as Abuelita Sanchez

== Broadway ==
- In The Summer House (1954)
- The Innkeepers (1956)
- The Wrong Way Lightbulb (1969)

== See also ==
- List of Puerto Ricans
- History of women in Puerto Rico
