= René Marqués =

Puerto Rican short story writer and playwright (1919–1979)

- René Marqués
- Born: October 4, 1919; Arecibo, Puerto Rico
- Died: March 22, 1979 (aged 59); San Juan, Puerto Rico
- Occupations: Writer, playwright
- Writing career
- Genres: Theatre, novels
- Notable work: La Carreta
- Movement: Generación de los 50

René Marqués (October 4, 1919 – March 22, 1979) was a Puerto Rican short story writer and playwright.

== Early years ==
Marqués was born, raised and educated in the city of Arecibo. He developed an interest in writing at a young age and was politically keen to support independence for the non-sovereign nation of Puerto Rico.

In the 1940s, Marqués wrote what is considered to be his best play, La Carreta (The Oxcart). In 1953, it opened in New York City. In 1954, it opened in San Juan and helped secure his reputation as a leading literary figure. The drama traces a rural Puerto Rican family as it moved to the slums of San Juan and then to New York in search of a better life, only to be disillusioned and to long for their island.

== The Generation of the 50s ==
René Marqués was a figure of what was known in Puerto Rico as "La generación del 50" (The Generation of the 50s). This was an artistic and literary group of Puerto Rican intellectuals which included Francisco Matos Paoli, Francisco Arriví, Abelardo Díaz Alfaro and Lorenzo Homar. In 1950, together with the other members of the group, Marqués worked for the Division of Community Education of Puerto Rico. Marqués however, did often come into conflict with journalist and politician Luis Muñoz Marín. Believing in the goal of complete Puerto Rican sovereignty, Marques often criticized Muñoz Marín after the latter man became governor of the territory, because he accepted U.S. sovereignty over Puerto Rico.

In 1954, Puerto Rican director Roberto Rodríguez produced La Carreta. The play opened at the Church of San Sebastian, located in Manhattan, New York. Because of its success, Míriam Colón and Rodríguez were inspired to form the first Latino theater group called "El Círculo Dramatico" (The Dramatic Circle). It had a 60-seat theater.

In 1955, Marqués wrote Juan Bobo y la Señora Occidental (Juan Bobo and the Occidental Lady).

In 1958 Victoria Espinosa directed Marques' Los soles truncos (The Half-Suns) at the First Puerto Rican Theatre Festival. This collaboration was a success and Espinosa was the only person to direct that play for the following thirty years.

In 1959, Marqués published three plays together in the collection Teatro (Theater). These were La Muerte no entrará en Palacio (Death will not enter the Palace), Un Niño Azul para esa Sombra (A Blue Boy for that Shadow) and Los Soles Truncos. In an essay (1960), which the Puerto Rican Nationalist Party published as a pamphlet, Marqués addressed the problem of the language of instruction in Puerto Rico's colonial situation. He concluded that only the enjoyment of complete national sovereignty will cleanse the pedagogical problem of all extra-pedagogical baggage.

== Later years ==
In 1965, George Edgar and Stella Holt produced the English version of Marqués' "The Oxcart" Off-Broadway, with Míriam Colón in the lead role.

René Marqués died in San Juan, Puerto Rico on March 22, 1979, at age 59. Puerto Rico has named a school in his honor. The Luis A. Ferré Performing Arts Center in San Juan has the 760-seat René Marqués Theater, named for him.

== Noted works ==
External audio
- You may view and listen to Acto 1 – Part 1 of René Marqués' "La Carreta" on YouTube

Plays

Juan Bobo and the Occidental Lady
La Carreta (The Oxcart)
El Hombre y Sus Sueños (Published in 1948)
El Hombre Y Sus Sueños Palm Sunday
El Sol y Los Mac Donald (Premiered 1950)
Los Soles Truncos (Premiered 1958) (Based on his short story "Purificación en la Calle del Cristo")
Un Niño Azul para esa Sombra
La Muerte No Entrará en Palacio
La Casa Sin Reloj
El Apartamiento
Mariana o el Alba
Sacrificio en el Monte Moriah
David y Jonatán, Tito y Berenice
Carnaval Afuera, Carnaval Adentro

Novels

La Víspera del Hombre
La Mirada (1975)

Essays

El Puertorriqueño Dócil
Ensayos 1956–1969

Short Stories

Otro Día Nuestro
En Una Ciudad Llamada San Juan
Purificación en la Calle del Cristo
Cuentos Puertorriqueños de Hoy

Screenplays

Juan Sin Seso (Brainless Juan) (Short Film; Dir. Luis A. Maisonet)
Modesta (Short Film; Dir. Benji Doniger, Music by Héctor Campos Parsi)

== See also ==
- List of Puerto Ricans
- Latino theatre in the United States
- French immigration to Puerto Rico
- List of Puerto Rican writers
- Puerto Rican literature
- Puerto Rican Nationalist Party
