= Jorge Ignacio Cortiñas =

American playwright and director

Jorge Ignacio Cortiñas is an American playwright and director. He first studied playwriting with Octavio Solis, Cherríe Moraga and María Irene Fornés. His numerous awards include fellowships from the New York Foundation for the Arts (NYFA) and the Guggenheim Foundation. He received an MFA from Brown University and lives in New York City.

== Plays ==
Possibly his highest profile play to date is Blind Mouth Singing, which was produced by the Chicago based Teatro Vista in 2005 and by the National Asian American Theater Company (NAATCO) in New York in 2007. The NAATCO production was designated a Critic's Pick by The New York Times. Writing for that newspaper Neil Genzlinger called the play "strange and beautiful".

In 2010 Blind Mouth Singing was translated and produced in Havana.

In 2012 the author directed a production of his play Bird in the Hand at Theater for the New City. That play was produced by Fulcrum Theater and was also designated as a Critic's Pick by The New York Times.

His 2017 play, Recent Alien Abductions received its premiere at the Humana Festival of New American Plays at the Actors Theater of Louisville directed by Les Waters. Louisville's weekly cultural newspaper, The LEO Weekly, called it "an extraordinary play".

His short play Look! A Latino was produced by Ma-Yi Theater Company in New York in October 2004. The play was presented during an evening of shorts that also included plays by Kia Corthron, Han Ong, and Sung Rno. The title of the play was inspired by Frantz Fanon's well known essay, "The Fact of Blackness" in which Fanon recounts being hailed by a French girl with the phrase, "Look! A Negro!" (see). Look! A Latino was subsequently published in the anthology Savage Stage: Plays by Ma-Yi Theater Company (see) and by Playscripts, Inc. (see).

== Politics ==
Before he began writing plays, Cortiñas worked as a community organizer for a variety of leftist or progressive causes. Most notably, he was a high-profile participant in AIDS activist groups, including the SF based group Proyecto ContraSIDA por Vida, and other organizations seeking to advance the rights of immigrants and queer Latino organizations.
