= Sophie Rivera =

American photographer (1938–2021)

- Born: June 1938; The Bronx, New York
- Died: May 22, 2021 (aged 82)
- Education: New School for Social Research Apeiron Workshops
- Occupations: Artist, photographer
- Spouse: Martin Hurwitz

Sophie Rivera (June 1938 – May 22, 2021) was an American artist and photographer of Puerto Rican-American descent. She was also an early member and instructor of En Foco, a not-for-profit organisation centred on contemporary fine art and photographers of diverse cultures. Rivera is best known for her 1978 photography series Nuyorican Portraits. Redefining Puerto Rican identity in the United States, the series included 50 black and white portraits taken in her home of Puerto Ricans in her neighbourhood.

== Biography ==
Rivera was born in 1938 in The Bronx, New York. She attended the New School for Social Research and Apeiron Workshops in Millerton, New York. Rivera's work included activism and teaching especially in her famous photography, the 1978 series Nuyorican Portraits. An early member and instructor of En Foco, Rivera later joined their board of advisors. Rivera also worked as a curator, and ran a photography gallery. She died on May 22, 2021.

== Artworks ==
Rouge et Noir (Red and Black) 1977-1978, included five coloured photographs capturing used tampons in a toilet bowl. Bowl Study, 1977–1978, included four black and white photographs of her own faces. Created during the same period, both series captured bodily fluids in a toilet bowl. Created to deconstruct the female body and taboo topics, Rivera's series was later followed with self-portrait, a black and white photograph capturing her crouched, naked body over a toilet bowl.

Nuyorican Portraits, 1978, is a collection of 50 black and white photographs of Puerto Rican Americans in her neighbourhood. Deconstructing the stereotypical American image of Puerto Ricans, the series functioned to embrace individuality and diversity. She consistently used her home as the location for the photographs, with participants captured against a black backdrop. Her most famous series, six pieces from the collection were presented at the Yankee Stadium on December 14, 1989, in an exhibition titled Revelations: A Latino Portfolio. Subsequently, 36 of the fifty photographs were destroyed in studio fire.

Woman and Child, 1979, a black and white photograph of a woman and toddler sitting together in a bus or train. This work was published in the journal Heresies, in an issue that explored the extent to which female artwork challenged societal views of the female sex. Heresies functioned to create a dialogue between Rivera's work and the audience and build a new perception of female artists.

Blizzard, 1980, a gelatin silver print depicting a person standing in a blizzard. Deliberately blurry, it is only the subject's smile that is visible.

== Exhibitions ==
=== Solo ===
- 1972 Third Eye Gallery, New York
- 1975 Goths, Demons, and others, Crossroads Gallery New York
- 1987 Sophie Rivera: All Hallow's Eve, El Museo del Barrio, New York
- 1996 Two/Two, University of Connecticut, West Hartford
- 2006 Portraits, Jersey City Museum, New Jersey

=== Our America: The Latino Presence in American Art (2013-2014) ===
Our America: The Latino Presence in American Art was presented by the Smithsonian American Art Museum and incorporated works from a diverse range of Latino artists. The works presented American culture as the holder of a diverse network of Latinos and conveyed the influence Latinos have had on American culture through their art. Two of Rivera's Nuyorican portraits was included in this exhibition. These portraits demonstrated that Latinos are not bystanders of the American culture and are instead helping build it. The Smithsonian American Art Museum now holds two photographs from the Nuyorican Portraits.

=== Radical Women: Latin America Art 1960 - 1985 (2017-2018) ===
Rivera's work was showcased in the exhibition Radical Women-Latin America Art 1960-1985 which presented the work of Latina artists during the 1960s and 1980s. Held at the Hammer Museum in 2017 and subsequently at the Brooklyn Museum of Art in 2018, the California exhibition included Rivera's 1977–1978 series Rouge et Noir, while the Brooklyn exhibition additionally included two portraits from her Nuyorican Portraits series. Showcasing racially diverse artists, the exhibition's summary stated, "The artists featured in Radical Women have made extraordinary contributions to the field of contemporary art, but little scholarly attention has been devoted to situating their work within the social, cultural, and political contexts in which it was made".

=== The ’70s Lens: Reimagining Documentary Photography (2024-2025) ===
The ’70s Lens: Reimagining Documentary Photography was presented by the National Gallery of Art, Washington, D. C. and included photographers whose work changed documentary photography and showed communities in a way that had been done before. Rivera was also featured in the Gallery's online feature 12 Documentary Photographers Who Changed the Way We See the World. The National Gallery owns several of Rivera's Nuyorican portraits in addition to other of Rivera's works.

== Awards ==
- New York Foundation for the Arts Award in Photography 1988-1989

== Bibliography ==
Aranda-Alvarado, Rocio. "Sophie Rivera: Portraits." Nueva Luz 11, no. 2 (2006): 31–34.

Associates, Midmarch. Women Artists News, Volumes 16–17. Midmarch Associates, 1991

Colon-Morales, Rafael. Sophie Rivera: All Hallows Eve. New York: El Museo del Barrio, 1987.

Ramírez, Rafael, and Sophie Rivera. Vapors: An En Foco Exhibition. Bronx, N.Y: En Foco, 1980. Print.

Ramos, E C. Our America: The Latino Presence in American Art., 2014. Print.

Rivera, Sophie. All Hallows Eve. New York, N.Y: El Museo del Barrio, 1986. Print.

Rivera, Sophie. Photographic Exhibition Two: September 17 - October 21, 1995. New York, NY: Wilmer Jennings Gallery at Kenkeleba, 1995. Print.

Seigel, J. Mutiny and the Mainstream: Talk that Changed Art, 1975–1990. Midmarch Arts Press, 1992

The Light Work Annual 2008. Light Work, 2008.

Three Women Three Islands: Sophie Rivera, Manhattan, Lilia Fontana, Cuba, Freida Medín Ojeda, Puerto Rico. New York, N.Y: El Museo del Barrio, 1983. Print.

Torruella Leval, Susana. "Looking at People." Center Quarterly; A Publication of the Center for Women's Studies and Services 12 (1990–91):unpaged
