= Cherríe Moraga =

American writer and activist (born 1952)

Cherríe L. Moraga
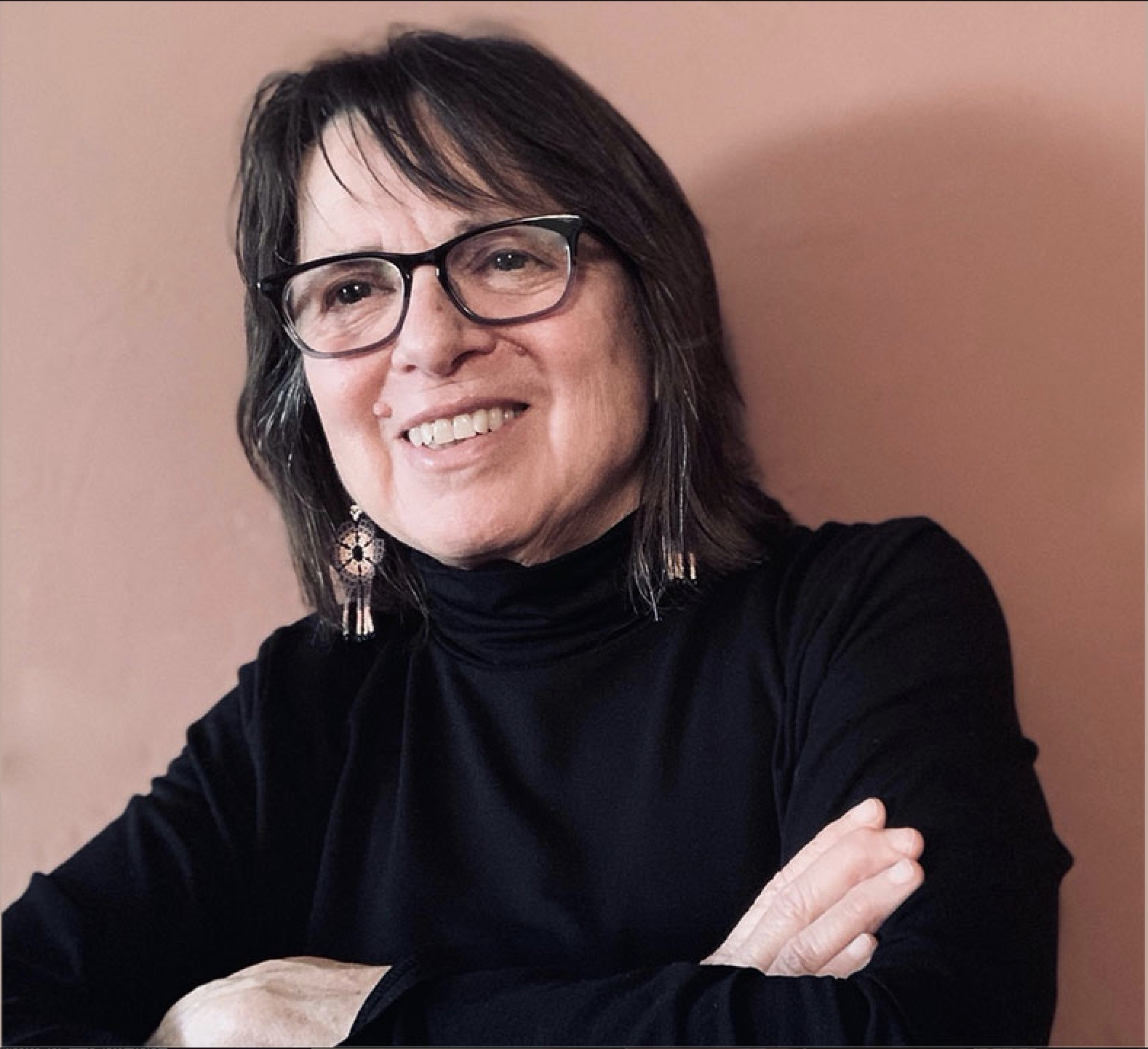
- Moraga in 2022
- Born: September 25, 1952 (age 73); Los Angeles, California, U.S.
- Education: Immaculate Heart College
- Alma mater: San Francisco State University
- Occupations: playwright; writer; poet; activist; distinguished professor
- Partner: Celia Herrera Rodríguez
- Writing career
- Subjects: Feminism; Chicana studies
- Notable work: This Bridge Called My Back (1981)
- Notable awards: Critics' Circle; PEN West; American Book Award

Cherríe L. Moraga (born September 25, 1952) is an influential Chicana feminist writer, activist, poet, essayist, and playwright. A prominent figure in Chicana literature and feminist theory, Moraga's work explores the intersections of gender, sexuality, race, and class, with particular emphasis on the experiences of Chicana and Indigenous women. She currently serves as distinguished professor in the Department of English at the University of California, Santa Barbara.

Moraga is widely recognized for her groundbreaking literary contributions and theoretical work in Chicana feminism. Her co-edited anthology This Bridge Called My Back (1981) is considered a foundational text in feminist and queer studies. Moraga is also a founding member of the social justice activist group La Red Xicana Indígena, which is network fighting for education, culture rights, and Indigenous Rights. In 2017, she co-founded, with Celia Herrera Rodríguez, Las Maestras Center for Xicana Indigenous Thought, Art, and Social Practice, located on the campus of UC Santa Barbara.

== Early life ==
Moraga was born on September 25, 1952, in Los Angeles County, California. In her 1979 article "La Guera", she wrote of her experiences growing up as a child of a white man and a Mexican woman, stating that "it is frightening to acknowledge that I have internalized a racism and classism, where the object of oppression not only someone outside of my skin, but the someone inside my skin." Moraga has cited her mother as her main inspiration to become a writer, stating that she was an eminent storyteller. As an adult, she changed her surname from Lawrence to Moraga because the name was not hers by blood, and she identified more with her mother's side and culture.

Moraga attended Immaculate Heart College in Los Angeles, gaining a graduated bachelor's degree in English in 1974. Soon after attending, she enrolled in a writing class at the Women's Building and produced her first lesbian poems. In 1977, she moved to San Francisco, where she supported herself as a waitress, became politically active as a burgeoning feminist, and discovered the feminism of women of color. She earned her master's degree in Feminist Writings from San Francisco State University in 1980.

== Writing and themes ==
Themes in her writing include the intersections of gender, sexuality, and race, particularly in cultural production by women of color. Moraga's work was featured in Tatiana de la Tierra's Latina lesbian magazine Esto no tiene nombre, which sought to inform and empower Latina lesbians through the work of writers like Moraga.

=== Sexuality ===
Moraga is openly gay, having come out as a lesbian after her college years. In "La Guera", Moraga compared the discrimination she experienced as a lesbian to her mother's experiences being a poor, uneducated Mexican woman, stating that "My lesbianism is the avenue through which I have learned the most about silence and oppression, and it continues to be the most tactile reminder to me that we are not free human beings". After coming out, Moraga began writing more heavily and became involved with the feminist movement. In Loving in the War Years, Moraga cites Capitalist Patriarchy: A Case for Socialist Feminism as an inspiration when realizing her intersecting identity as a Chicana lesbian, saying: "The appearance of these sisters' words in print, as lesbians of color, suddenly made it viable for me to put my Chicana and lesbian self in the center of my movement."

== Career ==
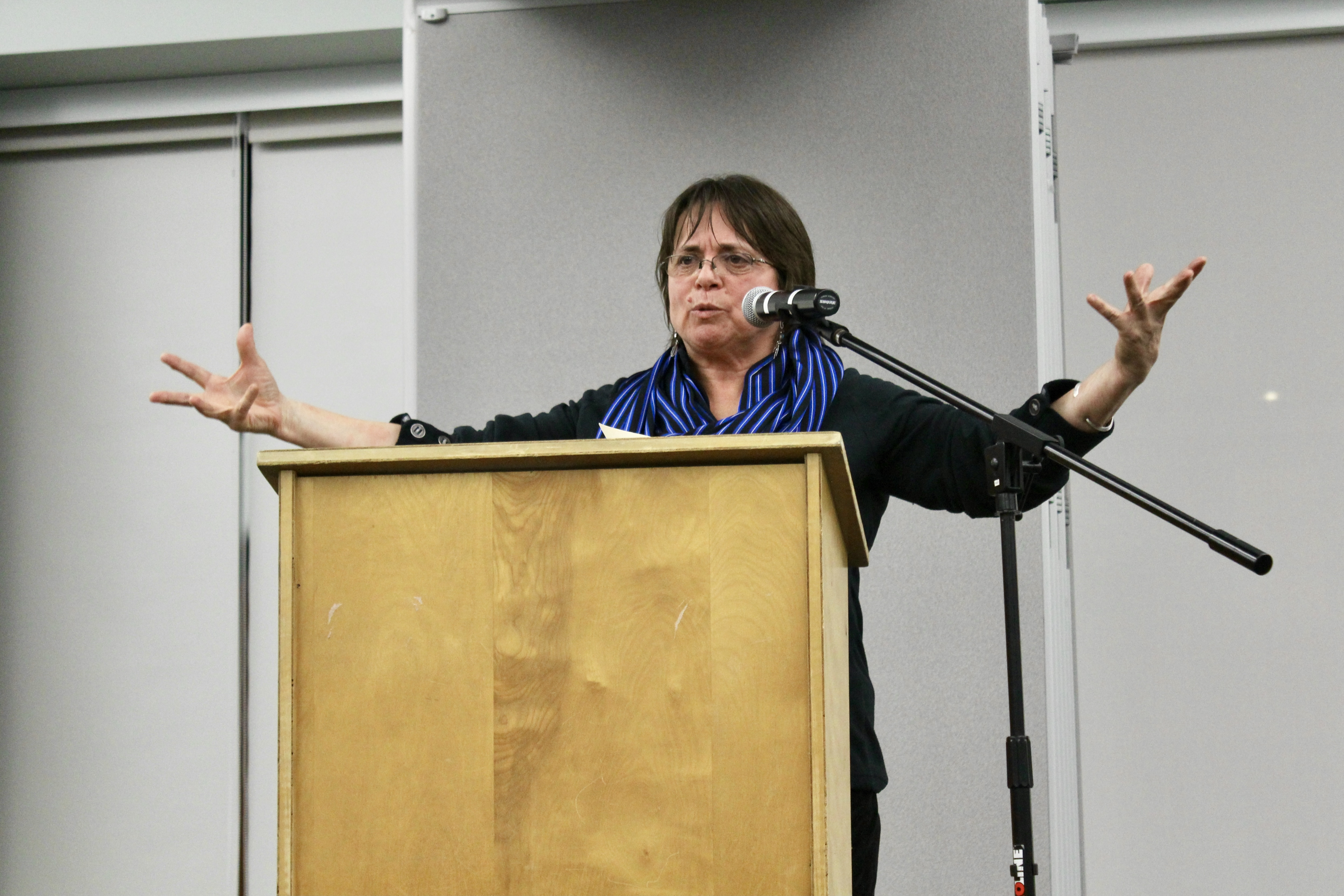
Moraga speaking in 2000

=== Literature and writing ===
Moraga co-edited the anthology This Bridge Called My Back: Writings by Radical Women of Color with Gloria Anzaldúa, and the first edition was published in 1981 by Persephone Press.

In 1983, Barbara Smith, Audre Lorde and Moraga started Kitchen Table: Women of Color Press, which has been credited as the first publisher dedicated to the writing of women of color in the United States. Kitchen Table published the second edition of This Bridge Called My Back. In 1986, the book won the Before Columbus Foundation American Book Award for that year. Along with Ana Castillo and Norma Alarcón, Moraga adapted this anthology into the Spanish-language Este puente, mi espalda: Voces de mujeres tercermundistas en los Estados Unidos. Later that same year Moraga's first sole-authored book, Loving in the War Years: lo que nunca pasó por sus labios, was published.

In 2007, Moraga was named a 2007 USA Rockefeller Fellow and granted $50,000 by United States Artists. She won a Creative Work Fund Award in 2008, and the Gerbode-Hewlett Foundation Grant for Playwriting in 2009.

Moraga has reflected on her experiences with feminist writing and activism in an oral history conducted by the Voices of Feminism Oral History Project.

==== Criticism of transgender politics ====
In 2009, Moraga published the essay "Still Loving in the (Still) War Years: On Keeping Queer Queer", which critiqued the mainstreaming of LGBT politics through an emphasis on same-sex marriage. In the essay she also discussed transgender people in queer communities and critiqued the increasing inclusion of trans issues in LGBT politics. She argues that young people are being pressured into transitioning by the larger queer culture, expressing fear that "the transgender movement at large, and plain ole peer pressure, will preempt young people from residing in that queer, gender-ambivalent site for as long and as deeply as is necessary." Some community members such as Morgan Collado and Francisco Galarte responded by emphasizing how this invalidated and dismissed the lived experience of young people who decide to transition. In this essay Moraga goes further to lament what she sees as the loss of butch and lesbian culture to those who choose to transition, stating that she "[does] not want to keep losing [her] macha daughters to manhood through any cultural mandates that are not of our own making." In response to this, Galarte argued that "Moraga's text forces transgender folks to bear the burden of proving loyalty to a nation as well as being the figure that is the exemplar of race, sex, and gender abjection and liberation". She was also criticized for her refusal to address transgender women in the essay.

=== Theater ===
From 1994 to 2002, Moraga published a couple of volumes of plays through West End Press of Albuquerque, NM. She has taught courses in dramatic arts and writing at various universities across the United States and is currently an artist in residence at Stanford University. She has written and produced numerous theater productions. She is currently involved in a theatre communications group and was the recipient of the NEA Theatre Playwriting Fellowship Award. In 2009 she received a Gerbode-Hewlett foundation grant for play writing.

Watsonville: Some Place Not Here

Moraga's 1996 play, Watsonville: Some Place Not Here, was commissioned by the Brava Theatre Center with support from the Rockefeller Foundation and had its world premiere at the Brava Theater May 25, 1996. It won the Kennedy Center for the Performing Arts and was winner of the Fund for New American Plays Award from the Kennedy Center for the Performing Arts.

== Select bibliography ==
=== Books ===
- This Bridge Called My Back: Writings by Radical Women of Color (co-editor with Gloria Anzaldúa). 1st edition, Watertown: Persephone Press, 1981. 2nd edition, New York: Kitchen Table: Women of Color Press, 1983. 3rd edition, Berkeley: Third Woman Press, 2002. 4th edition, Albany: State University of New York Press, 2015. Fortieth Anniversary edition, Albany: State University of New York Press, 2015.
- Loving in the War Years - Lo que nunca pasó por sus labios. 1st edition, Boston: South End Press, 1983. 2nd edition, Boston: South End Press, 2000.
- Cuentos: Stories By Latinas (co-editor with Alma Gómez and Mariana Romo-Carmona). New York: Kitchen Table: Women of Color Press,1983.
- Esta puente, mi espalda: Voces de mujeres tercermundistas en los Estados Unidos (co-editor with Ana Castillo). San Francisco: ISM Press, 1988.
- The Last Generation: Prose and Poetry. Boston: South End Press, 1993.
- The Sexuality of Latinas (co-editor with Norma Alarcón and Ana Castillo). Berkeley: Third Woman Press, 1993.
- Heroes and Saints and Other Plays. Albuquerque: West End Press, 1994.
- Waiting in the Wings: Portrait of a Queer Motherhood. 1st edition, Ithaca: Firebrand Books, 1997. 25 Anniversary edition, Chicago: Haymarket Books, 2022.
- The Hungry Woman: A Mexican Medea & The Heart of the Earth: A Popol Vuh Story. Albuquerque: West End Press, 2001.
- Watsonville: Some Place Not Here & Circle in the Dirt: El Pueblo de East Palo Alto. Albuquerque: West End Press, 2002.
- A Xicana Codex of Changing Consciousness: Writings, 2000-2010. Durham: Duke University Press, 2011.
- Native Country of the Heart: A Memoir. New York: Farrar, Straus, and Girox, 2019.
- Loving in the War Years and Other Writings, 1978-1999. Chicago: Haymarket Books, 2023.

=== Theater ===
- Giving up the Ghost (1986)
- Shadow of a Man (1990)
- Coatlicue's Call/ El llamado de Coatlicue (1990)
- Heroes and Saints (1992)
- Shadow of a Man (1992)
- Heart of the Earth: A Popol Vuh Story (1994)
- A Circle in the Dirt (1995)
- Watsonville: Some Place Not Here (1996)
- The Hungry Woman (1995)
- Circle in the Dirt (2002)
- Digging Up the Dirt (2010)
- New Fire: To Put Things Right Again (2012).
- The Mathematics of Love (2016)

=== Other works ===
- "Art in América Con Acento" (1994). Anthologized in Women Writing Resistance: essays on Latin America and the Caribbean (2003). Cambridge, Massachusetts: South End Press.

== Selected critical works on Cherríe Moraga ==
- Alarcón, Norma. "The Theoretical Subject(s) of This Bridge Called My Back and Anglo-American Feminism." Criticism in the Borderlands: Studies in Chicano Literature, Culture and Ideology. Eds. Héctor Calderón and José David Saldívar. Durham and London: Duke University Press, 1991. 28–39.
- Allatson, Paul. "'I May Create a Monster': Cherríe Moraga's Hybrid Denial." Antípodas: Journal of Hispanic and Galician Studies 11-12 (1999/2000): 103-121.
- Allatson, Paul. "Cherríe Moraga." The Greenwood Encyclopedia of Multiethnic American Literature. Ed. Emmanuel S. Nelson. Westport, CT: Greenwood Press, 2005. Vol. 3: 1520–23.
- Arrizón, Alicia. "Cherríe Moraga." 50 Key Figures in Queer US Theatre. Eds. Jimmy A. Noriega and Jordan Schildcrout. London and New York: Routledge, 2022. 170-174.
- Gilmore, Leigh. Autobiographics: A Feminist Theory of Women's Self-Representation. Ithaca: Cornell University Press, 1994.
- Ikas, Karin Rosa. Chicana Ways: Conversations with Ten Chicana Writers. Reno: University of Nevada Press, 2002.
- Negrón-Muntaner, Frances. "Cherríe Moraga." Latin American Writers on Gay and Lesbian Themes: A Bio-Critical Sourcebook. Ed. David William Foster. Westport, CT: Greenwood Press, 1994. 254–62.
- Vivancos Perez, Ricardo F. doi:10.1057/9781137343581 Radical Chicana Poetics. London and New York: Palgrave Macmillan, 2013.
- Yarbro-Bejarano, Yvonne. "Cherríe Moraga." Dictionary of Literary Biography. Vol. 82: Chicano Writers First Series. Eds. Francisco A. Lomelí and Carl R. Shirley. Detroit: Gale/Bruccoli Clark Layman, 1989. 165–77.
- Yarbro-Bejarano, Yvonne. "De-constructing the Lesbian Body: Cherríe Moraga's Loving in the War Years." The Lesbian and Gay Studies Reader. Ed. Henry Abelove, Michèle Ana Barale and David M. Halperin. New York: Routledge, 1993. 595–603.
- Yarbro-Bejarano, Yvonne. The Wounded Heart: Writing on Cherríe Moraga. Austin: University of Texas Press, 2001.

== Awards ==
- Brudner Prize. Lesbian, Gay, Bisexual, and Transgender Studies at Yale University, New Haven, Connecticut, 2013.
- United States Artist Rockefeller Fellowship for Literature, 2007.
- National Association for Chicana and Chicano Studies Scholars Award, 2001.
- David R. Kessler Award. CLAGS: The Center for LGBTQ Studies (In honor of contributions to the field of Queer Studies), 2000.
- The First Annual Cara Award. UCLA Chicano Studies Research Center/ Cesar Chavez Center for Interdisciplinary Instruction in Chicana/Chicano Studies, 1999.
- The Fund for New American Plays Award, a project of the John F. Kennedy Center for the Performing Arts, 1995 and 1991.
- Lifetime Achievement Award, Ellas in Acción, San Francisco, 1995.
- Lesbian Rights Award, Southern California Women for Understanding ("for Outstanding Contributions in Lesbian Literature and for Service to the Lesbian Community"), 1991.
- The National Endowment for the Arts Theater Playwrights' Fellowship, 1993.
- The PEN West Literary Award for Drama, 1993.
- The Critics' Circle Award for Best Original Script, 1992 (Heroes and Saints).
- The Will Glickman Playwriting Award, 1992.
- The Drama-logue Award for Playwriting, 1992.
- The Outlook Foundation, Literary Award, 1991.
- The California Arts Council Artists in Community Residency Award, 1991-2 /1993-5.
- The American Book Award, Before Columbus Foundation, 1986.
- The Creative Arts Public Service (CAPS) Grant for Poetry, New York State, 1983.
- The Mac Dowell Colony Fellowship for Poetry, New Hampshire, 1982.

== See also ==
- Chicana feminism
- Feminist epistemology
- Lesbian feminism
- Lesbian Poetry
- Radical feminism
- Third-world feminism
- List of Mexican American writers
- List of women writers
- American Literature in Spanish
