= La Carreta =

Book by René Marqués

- Original language: Spanish
- Written by: René Marqués
- Setting: San Juan; The Bronx

Premiere
- Date: May 7, 1953
- Place: San Sebastian Auditorium

La Carreta (English: The Oxcart) is a 1953 play by Puerto Rican playwright René Marqués. The story follows a family of "jíbaros", or rural peasants, who in an effort to find better opportunities end up moving to the United States (see Puerto Rican migration to New York).

The story is divided in three acts, each focusing on a specific location. The first act begins with the family preparing to move from the countryside to San Juan, capital of Puerto Rico, in search of a "better life". The second act takes place a year later in San Juan, specifically in La Perla slum, where the family has moved. The final act takes place yet another year apart, in The Bronx, New York, where the family has ended, looking for a better life.

A 2009 production of the play in Puerto Rico starred Johanna Rosaly in the role of Gabriela. It was performed in March in Caguas and Santurce in Puerto Rico and then in September and October in Mayaguez and Santurce. The show was produced by New Moon Productions and directed by Pablo Cabrera.

== Characters ==
- Luis: Doña Gabriela's oldest “son” (he is the son of a man and another woman, but his father thought he was the father because he was with the woman before marrying Doña Gabriela so they took him as their own only Doña Gabriela knew the whole truth) who assumes leadership of the family after the death of his father; his idealism takes the form of love of progress exemplified in machines and industry; he is completely assimilated into the mechanized world and is insensitive to his surroundings; he dies, ironically, from a freak accident at the factory.
- Chaguito: a mischievous, streetwise, aggressive, and disrespectful adolescent. He hates school and ends up arrested for theft. Doesn't get his "dulce de coco".
- Doña Gabriela: a widow and mother of Chaguito and Juanita and stepmother of Luis; she has a strong character which is undermined during the transition to the city; she is bound by her role as a mother and is very protective of the insecure Luis by supporting his decision to move the family, thereby stifling her true feelings.
- Juanita: the character who experiences the most development in her transition from a docile personality to a strong, politicized one; she challenges the traditional concept of honor and the double standard that obligates women, not men, to maintain the family honor, which she defies by becoming a prostitute; her political development comes as a result of witnessing the oppression of minority groups in New York City, especially through judicial inequalities.
- Don Chago: Doña Gabriela's widowed father who is stubborn in his refusal to follow the family when it leaves the farm for the city; he symbolizes the strength of traditional values through his idealistic love of the land and his nostalgic treatment of the “old days”; he is very sensitive and intelligent with definite anti-government, anti-capitalistic, and anti-clerical tendencies; he stays behind to spend his remaining days in a cave and dies.
- Germana: a nosey neighbor on the farm who tries to marry her daughter off to Luis, to no avail.
- Lito: a lively, happy-go-lucky boy who lives in the family's neighborhood in San Juan.
- Matilde: described as a plump 35-year-old who encourages Juanita to enter into the life of prostitution in “La Perla”, San Juan.
- Doña Isabel: 44-year-old former teacher who now helps her husband, Don Severo, at the saloon; she is described as tall and slender, well-spoken and well-dressed; has a brief affair with Luis, who is really interested in her niece, Martita.
- Paco: 30-year-old Puerto Rican writer and radio announcer who meets Juanita in New York and proposes marriage.
- Lidia: 26-year-old friend of Juanita in New York; slender and tall with long hair and bangs.
- Mr. Parkinton: A 40-year-old American preacher, described as tall and thin, has a patronizing attitude towards the Puerto Ricans he is trying to convert.

== Plot ==
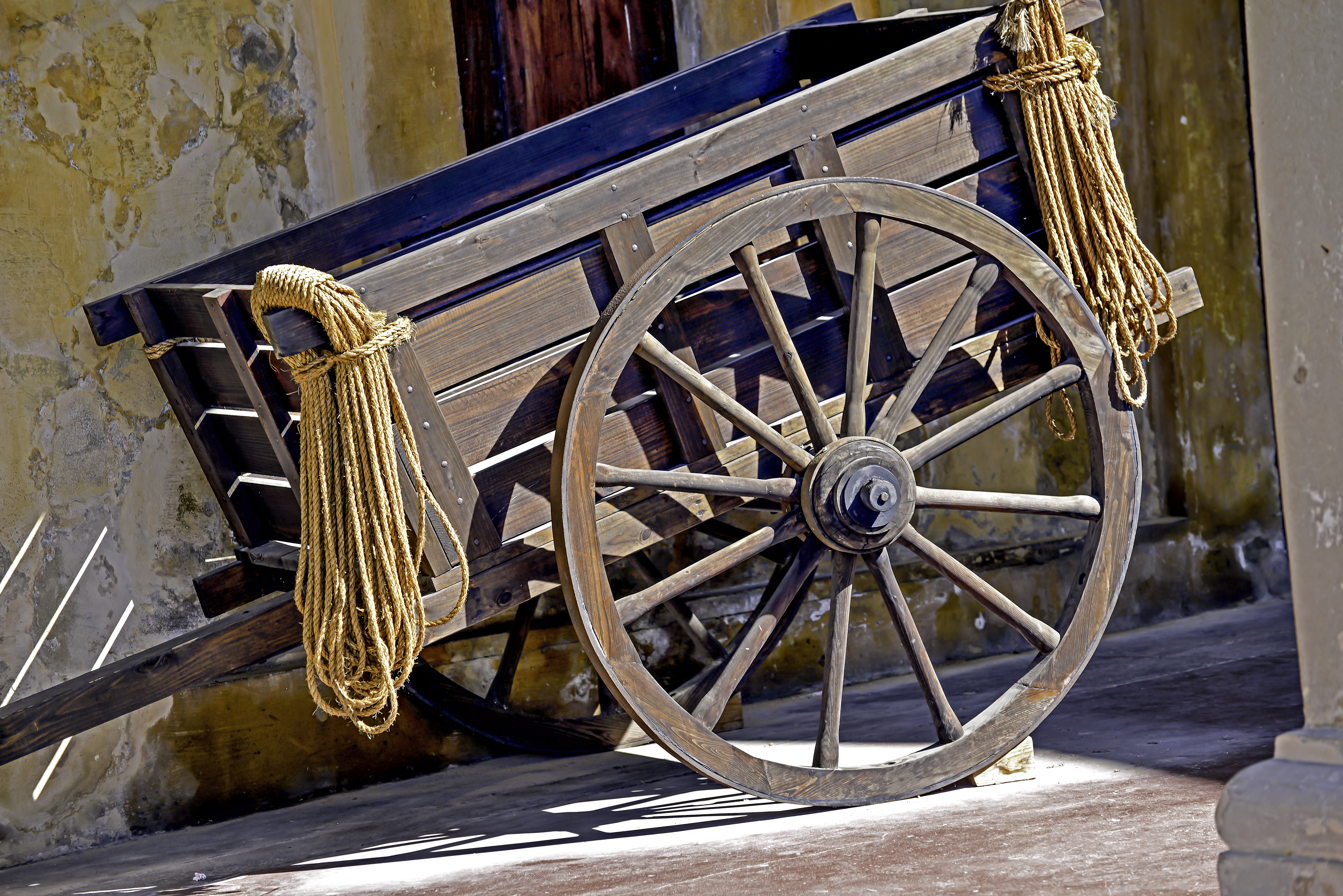
Carreta in San Juan, Puerto Rico

Act I takes place in an unidentified mountainous region outside of San Juan. The family—Doña Gabriela, Luis, Juanita, and Chaguito, are packing for their move to San Juan. There is a great deal of tension in this scene as the family remembers nostalgically its traditions as they break away from them. Don Chago, the grandfather, refuses to move, and unbeknownst to the family, intends to live out his days in the solitude of a cave. He is Marqués personified by his love of the land and his attitude against industrial development. He blames his deceased son-in-law for the family's inability to keep up with the mortgage payments and the subsequent loss of the farm. Luis, technically the head of the family now that his father has died, decides that a move to the city will bring prosperity to the family, and they unquestioningly follow his wishes. In reality, Luis is the son of his father and another woman, but is accepted totally by Doña Gabriela, who cautiously guards this “secret” from him, not realizing that he indeed knows. Luis’ strong determination to secure a better life for his family in a mechanized world can be seen almost as an overcompensation for the gratitude he feels as an undeserving stepchild who enjoys the rights and privileges of a blood-relative. Juanita is ambivalent about the move as a local farmer, Miguel, is now courting her. Her mother worries about the sexual implications of this relationship and is relieved to know that it will be severed by their move.

Act II finds the family in a San Juan slum, ironically called “The Pearl”. They live alongside a noisy bar and Lito is introduced as a liaison between the family and this establishment. He infers that Luis is involved in gambling and in an illicit love affair with the owner's wife. By the end of this act, Luis has been unsuccessful in five factory jobs and ironically ends up as a gardener for a wealthy family, thus returning to the land he had hoped to flee. Chaguito has taken on all the influences of the street and his thievery results in incarceration. Juanita, reacting to a rape resulting in pregnancy, attempts suicide. Doña Gabriela is distraught with grief and accepts Luis’ suggestion of yet another move—this time to New York City as a solution to their problems.

Act III develops in Morrisania, a Puerto Rican area of the Bronx. It is wintertime and they are suffering the bitter cold for the first time. Juanita is “working” (she has become a prostitute) and rents a room in another part of town. Luis is disgusted by her independence and wants her to move back so that he can support her. She refuses a marriage proposal by a Puerto Rican radio announcer who perceives her sensitivity beyond her citified facade. Doña Gabriela refuses to confront Juanita by not believing in the obvious source of her income. She is overwhelmed by the changes in the family and gradually loses her fiery spirit. She silently accepts her fate, continuing to accept whatever Luis plans for them. Luis is obsessed with his job in a boiler factory as he provides the family with the trappings of a “better” life. The play ends as the tragic hero succumbs to his flaw when the machine he idolizes causes his death. The family returns to Puerto Rico to bury him, again ironically, in the land which he fled.

== See also ==
- Latino Theater in the United States
- Puerto Rican literature
- Puerto Rican Traveling Theater
- Pregones
- Puerto Rican migration to New York
- An Analysis of “The Oxcart” by René Marqués, Puerto Rican Playwright (by Norine Polio)
- Myrna Vázquez
