= INTAR Theatre =

American Hispanic theater company

- Interactive map of INTAR Theatre
- Address: 500 W. 52nd Street, 4th Floor; New York, NY; United States
- Coordinates: 40.766006°N 73.991325°W

Construction
- Opened: 1966

Website
- www.intartheatre.org

INTAR Theatre, founded in 1966, is one of the oldest Hispanic theater companies in the United States. The INTAR acronym is for International Arts Relations.

== History ==
INTAR Theatre was founded in New York in 1966 as Asociación de Arte Latinoamericano (ADAL) by a group of Cuban and Puerto Rican writers and artists. Cuban-born Max Ferrá served as INTAR's artistic director since its founding until 2004, when Cuban-American playwright Eduardo Machado assumed artistic leadership of the organization.

In its early years, INTAR focused on producing in Spanish the works of significant European and American playwrights. In the 1970s, the organization began producing works in English by Ibero-American and Latino writers. The theater company has built on this strength and emphasizes in new works that reflect the cultural heritage and concerns of the Hispanic community in the United States. Works have included drama, musicals, children's theater, collaborative visual arts and theater creations, and traveling productions.

In 1977 it was of first eight theaters that replaced adult entertainment venues on 42nd Street to form Theatre Row.

INTAR has historically focused on four program areas. The theater program has resulted in over 125 theater productions by more than 175 playwrights and composers. The developmental theater program has hosted various writing labs and workshops designed to support the creation of new theater works by Hispanic artists. Almost every Latino playwright working today has participated in one of INTAR's workshops. Cuban-born, avant-garde playwright María Irene Fornés directed the Hispanic Playwrights-in-Residence Lab from 1981 to 1991. Graciela Daniele ran a Music Theater Lab from 1985 to 1989, and in 1991, INTAR hosted an Actors Lab.

The New Works Lab was founded in 1994 under the direction of Michael Garces and is designed to support the creative development of emerging directors, writers, actors and other artists from the Latino theater community. Most recently, INTAR launched the Actor's Collective as part of its developmental theater program.

Inverna Lockpez founded INTAR's Latin American Gallery in 1979, serving as curator through the 1990s. The Gallery was established as an alternative space to provide exposure for emerging and established Latino and Latin American artists, producing bilingual catalogs and posters for its exhibitions.

INTAR also operated an educational program for public school students, including field days bringing students and teachers to INTAR for matinee performances and guided tours; an internship program; and in-school touring productions.

Today, INTAR focuses on its theater and developmental theater programs.

== Works or publications ==
- A Royal Affair. 1995. OCLC 79468776.
- Any Place but Here : a Play. 1993. OCLC 49289803.
- Chronicle of a Death Foretold. 1995. OCLC 79394337.
- Cuba Libre : a musical celebration. 1995. OCLC 79394911.
- Don Juan of Seville. 1989. OCLC 212381945.
- Equinox. 1984. OCLC 54457578.
- Forever in My Heart. 1996. OCLC 57033869.
- In the Land of Giants. 1996. OCLC 57033849.
- Inkarrí's Return. 1996. OCLC 57033814.
- La Chunga. 1986. OCLC 298253587.
- Mystery of the Rose Bouquet. 1998. OCLC 56089591.
- Sancho & Don. 1994. OCLC 79450706.
- Sarita. 1984. OCLC 56385327.
- Terra Incognita a New Opera for the Theatre. 1997. OCLC 53968307.
- The Cuban Swimmer. 1984. OCLC 78968764.
- The Extravagant Triumph of Jesus Christ, Karl Marx, and William Shakespeare. 1982. OCLC 77741304.
- The Senorita from Tacna. 1983. OCLC 50106978.
- The Shoemaker's Prodigious Wife. 1998. OCLC 51636461.
- Three Women Three Islands : Sophie Rivera, Manhattan, Lilia Fontana, Cuba, Freida Medín Ojeda, Puerto Rico. New York, N.Y.: El Museo del Barrio. 1983. OCLC 74666333.
- Union City Thanksgiving : a Comedy-drama. 1983. OCLC 83446163.

== See also ==
- Latino theatre in the United States
- Latino literature
- Puerto Rican literature
- Puerto Rican Traveling Theater
