= West End Press =

American publisher

- Founded: 1975
- Founder: John Crawford
- Country of origin: United States
- Headquarters location: Albuquerque, New Mexico
- Distribution: University of New Mexico Press
- Publication types: Books
- Official website: unmpress.com/West_End_Press

West End Press is an American publishing house specializing in politically progressive literature.

Founded in New York City in 1975 by John Crawford, the press has published more than 100 titles by writers such as Meridel Le Sueur, Pablo Neruda, Thomas McGrath, Sharon Doubiago, and Joseph Bruchac. It is now based in Albuquerque, New Mexico, and its books are distributed by the University of New Mexico Press.

West End takes its name from The West End Bar, located on Broadway across from Columbia University, which was the original site of West End Magazine, established 1971. The name was carried over to West End Press by Crawford, who served as editor and publisher of both the magazine and the press, and who frequented the bar with other students and writers while completing graduate studies at Columbia.
