= Black Repertory Theatre of Kansas City =

Theatre company

The Black Repertory Theatre of Kansas City (BRTKC) is a not-for-profit theatre company in the Kansas City metropolitan area area that promotes Black theatre makers. Alongside its production season, the company focuses on the theatrical education of Black youths in the community.

== History ==
The Black Repertory Theatre of Kansas City (BRTKC) was founded by Damron Russel Armstrong in 2016. Born in Windsor, North Carolina, Armstrong moved to Kansas City so his father could play football for the Kansas City Chiefs. When Armstrong got older, he moved to New York City to pursue acting. Surrounded by the large African American theatre community in New York, Armstrong realized "there wasn't any real platform for African American voices in Kansas City." He returned to Kansas City and founded the BRTKC. Their inaugural season consisted of 4 productions:

- Five Guys Named Moe by Clarke Peters and Louis Jordan
- Stick Fly by Lydia R. Diamond
- The African Company Presents Richard III by Carlyle Brown
- Dreamgirls by Tom Eyen and Henry Krieger

The productions were located at theaters around the Kansas City area, such as The Arts Asylum, Paseo Performing Arts Center, and The Fishtank Theater. In 2024, The Boone Theatre, a historic Kansas City theatre, set out to do renovations and become the home of the BRTKC and The Black Movie Hall of Fame. Renovations are due for completion in April 2026.

The company began its education program in partnership with various local schools to teach playwriting. This grew to include teaching other aspects of theatre, providing mentorships, internships, and scholarships for Black Kansas City youth. The company's Young Actors Summer Conservatory, run by founder and artistic director Armstrong, is an application-based summer camp with the goal of creating a performance for the public. They have staged musicals including Finding Nemo Jr. and The Lion King. BRTKC prioritizes educating campers in "drama, dance, music, stagecraft, and African American theatre history."

== Major productions ==
BRTKC have put on over 40 productions, ranging from William Shakespeare's classics to new works by various Black playwrights. They have partnered with The White Theatre at the J through The Jewish Community Center of Kansas City on productions including Hairspray by Mark O'Donnell and Thomas Meehan, Memphis by David Bryan and Joe DiPietro, and Blues in the Night by Sheldon Epps. They have performed works such as A Raisin in the Sun by Lorraine Hansberry in 2023, Ma Rainey's Black Bottom by August Wilson in 2021, and The Colored Museum by George C. Wolfe in 2018. Their production of 'Ain't Misbehavin' by Murray Horwitz and Richard Maltby, Jr. and Luther Henderson in 2018 was described by the University of Missouri - Kansas City news as "crisp" with "rapscallion chemistry". BRTKC's production of 'Memphis' was directed by Armstrong, and his direction was said by Paul Horsley to have the ability to "'clear the air' for an important line or moment, to quiet the motion and noise onstage so that we can focus on a punchline or a bon mot."

They have staged work by various playwrights including Jocelyn Bioh, Pearl Cleage, Antoinette Nwandu, and Dominique Morisseau. BRTKC has also worked with playwrights on new works including Brittany K. Allen (Redwood) and Pamela Baskin-Watson and Nedra Dixon (A God Sib's*Tale).

== Awards ==
- The Kathy Award (Actors' Equity Association, 2018)
- The Paul Robeson Award (Actors' Equity Association, 2023)
