= She Kills Monsters =

2011 drama-comedy play

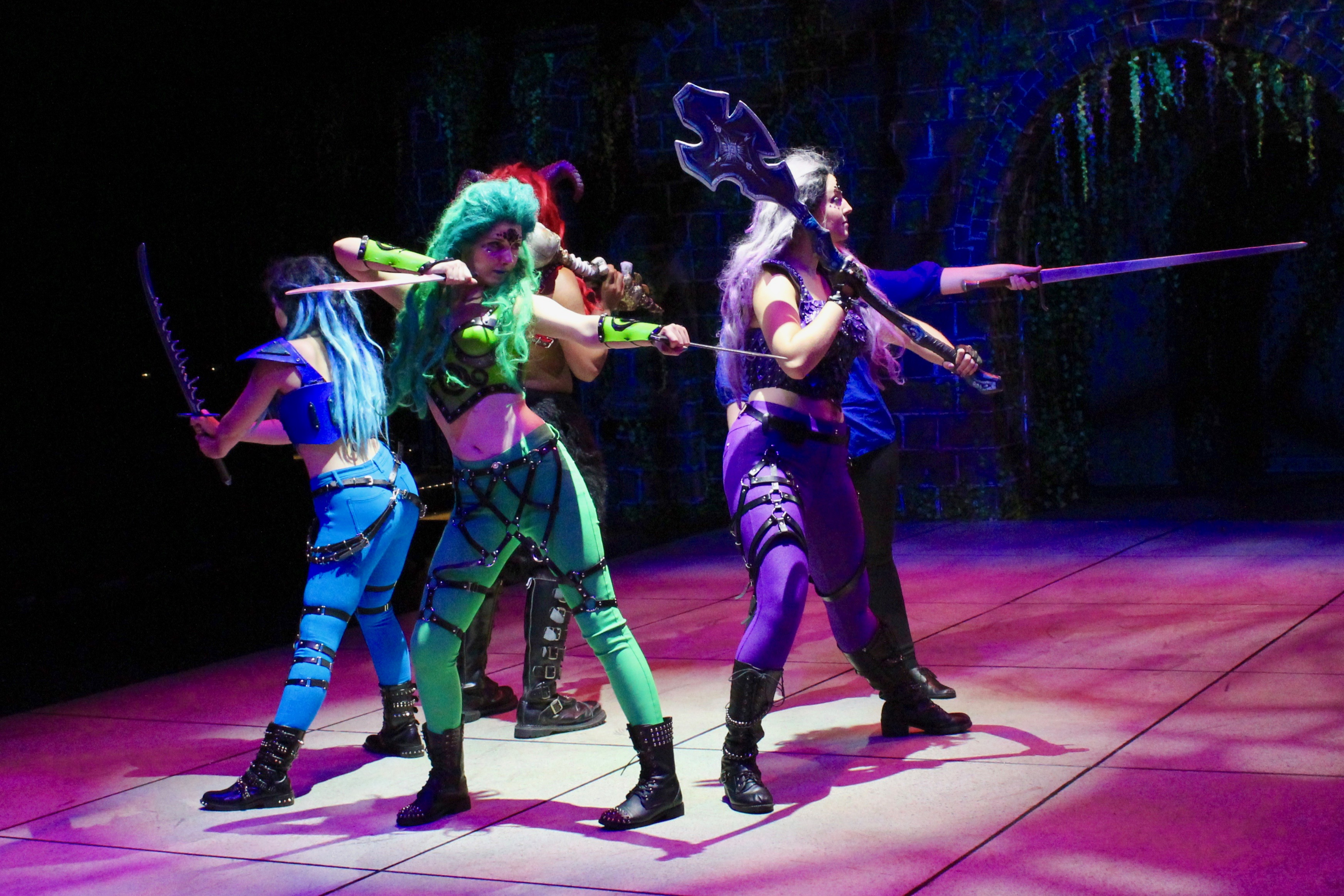
- A performance of the play at the University of Arkansas
- Written by: Qui Nguyen
- Based on: Dungeons & Dragons
- Genre: Comedy-drama, Fantasy/Adventure
- Setting: Athens, Ohio, c. 1995

Premiere
- Date: November 4, 2011
- Place: The Flea Theater, New York City

She Kills Monsters is a drama-comedy play by Qui Nguyen that debuted in 2011. It tells the story of Agnes Evans, an average woman who loses her parents and little sister Tilly in a car accident. Having been very distant from her sister while she was alive, Agnes embarks on an adventure to get to know her sister better by playing a Dungeons & Dragons module that Tilly had written, and discovers things she'd never imagined. The plot takes place in reality and in the imaginary game world; in the game world Agnes learns about Tilly's exploration with her sexuality and how she struggled with her sexuality in reality. The play is also presented in a "Young Adventurers Edition" which removes the explicit language and ages down some of the characters.

== Plot ==
Agnes Evans is a completely average woman who strives to be nothing but average until the day she wishes her life were a little less boring. Her wish unfortunately comes true when her family, including her younger sister Tilly, dies in a car crash. Agnes was never close to Tilly because they were interested in completely different things; Agnes loved mainstream pop culture, while Tilly had a passion for everything classified as nerdy or geeky, with a special love for Dungeons & Dragons. As Agnes is cleaning and packing Tilly's room in order to move everything to her place, she finds a module Tilly had written for D&D. In order to get closer to the sister she never really knew, Agnes embarks on her own adventure with the help of Dungeon Master Chuck to play the game as Tilly designed. As she delves deeper into her quest, the fantasy world and reality begin to collide and mix as Agnes searches to connect with Tilly and realizes how much of her sister she never knew.

== Characters ==
- Agnes Evans: Agnes is described as striving to live an absolutely average life. She is of average height, size, and build, and grew up in the average town of Athens, Ohio with average parents. In the original version of the play, Agnes is a 25-year-old English teacher at her and Tilly's former high school. In the Young Adventurer's (YA) version, she is a senior in high school. After Tilly's death, Agnes decides to go on a D&D adventure in order to feel closer to Tilly, as they never had a close relationship.
- Tilly Evans/Tillius the Paladin: Agnes's sister who dies in a car crash at the age of fifteen. Tilly has a love for D&D adventures and anything classified as nerdy or geeky. Tilly remains the same age in the original version and the Young Adventurer's (YA) version. Through the D&D module Agnes plays, it is learned that Tilly was facing her own challenges with her sexuality and bullying while she was still alive. In the game, her girlfriend is Lilith, who is later learned to be based on one of her friends named Lilly (or Elizabeth).
- Miles: Agnes's boyfriend of five years. During the original version of the play, Miles and Agnes are in the process of moving in together, while in the YA version Miles is also a senior and on the high school football team. Miles is shown to be scared of commitment in the original version for not proposing to Agnes; however, at the end of the play the Narrator reveals that they eventually did get married. He appears in the game as a shapeshifting "gelatinous cube" that Agnes must kill.
- Orcus/Ronnie: A demon overlord of the underworld that holds onto lost souls or knows where to find them. He is obsessed with watching television. The party travels to him first in order to ask about the Lost Soul of Athens. He later joins the party on their quest. He is based on one of Tilly's high school friends named Ronnie.
- Vera: Agnes's best friend in both versions of the play, the difference being in the original she is the school's counselor and in the YA version she works at a GAP outlet store. She is supportive of Agnes, but does not approve of Miles.
- Chuck: A member of Tilly's friend group and the Dungeon Master for the game. He helps Agnes throughout the module and introduces her to Tilly's other real life friends.
- Lilith Morningstar/Lilly: A Demon Queen that resembles a leather-clad dominatrix and is Tilly's girlfriend in the game. Lilith is based on Tilly's high school friend Lilly, who was Tilly's first kiss but is still in the closet.
- Kaliope Darkwalker/Kelly: Kaliope is a Dark Elf that is described as looking like a supermodel and is incredibly strong. She is based on Tilly's high school friend Kelly, who is Ronnie's sister.
- Narrator: Describes the events going on in the story and gives background description of the reason behind the story and the characters of Agnes and Tilly. The narrator is described as sounding like Cate Blanchett from The Lord of the Rings.
- Steve: In real life he is one of Tilly's classmates. In the game he is a mage that usually is on the receiving end of bosses showing how powerful they are, resulting in his death multiple times over.
- Farrah: A fairy and one of the bosses Agnes and her party must face before they can reach the final boss.
- Evil Gabbi and Evil Tina: Cheerleader succubi that torment Tilly, in particular about her sexuality, both in the game and when she was alive. They are based on Tilly's high school bullies.

== Background and production history ==
Nguyen intentionally wrote the characters in a way that allowed for actors of any race to be cast into every role, "We wanted to see the diversity you would find on the New York subway onstage."

She Kills Monsters received its off-off-Broadway debut at The Flea Theater in New York City on November 4, 2011, and it ran until December 23. Directed by Robert Ross Parker, the production was performed by the resident company of actors of The Flea Theater called The Bats. The play was presented later at the Steppenwolf Theatre Company in Chicago from February 15 to April 21, 2013. It was directed by Scott Weinstein and it featured the Buzz22 Chicago Company as the cast. The play reprised at the Company One Theater in Boston from April 13 to May 11, 2013, directed by Shira Milikowsky.

Following a 2013 award by the American Alliance for Theater and Education, the play has, as of July 2020, been staged close to 800 times, mostly by high schools and colleges. Some of these productions have done well, including a 2018 production which won a state contest. In response to requests by schools, Nguyen wrote a version of the play, dubbed She Kills Monsters: Young Adventurers Edition, that included less profanity, changed Agnes into a high school cheerleader and eliminated the death of Agnes and Tilly's parents. Later, in response to the COVID-19 pandemic, Nguyen wrote a version designed to be performed online, called She Kills Monsters: Virtual Realms. Changes include depicting the climactic battle through dice-rolling rather than a physical fight, as well as setting the entire play in 2020 and updating its pop culture references accordingly.

In October 2021, after weeks of rehearsal, a production of She Kills Monsters: Young Adventurers Edition at Hillsboro High School in Highland County, Ohio was cancelled by Hillsboro City Schools Superintendent Tim Davis, allegedly on the grounds that "one of its characters might be gay". In a statement, Davis said, "The fall play has been canceled this year because the play was not appropriate for our K-12 audience." Students subsequently started a GoFundMe campaign to mount the production independently of their school. Within a week of its launch, the campaign had more than tripled its $5,000 goal.

In February 2024, the drama club at Fort Atkinson High School in Fort Atkinson, Wisconsin was prohibited from performing the play by principal Leigh Ann Scheuerell. The Daily Jefferson County Union later reported that Sheuerell said her decision had "nothing to do with the sexual orientation of a character.” The club performed Alice in Wonderland instead.

== Notable casts ==
Character	Off-Broadway (2011)	Steppenwolf Theatre Company (2013)	Company One (2013)
Agnes Evans	Satomi Blair	Katherine Banks	Paige Clark Perkinson
Tilly Evans/Tillus the Paladin	Allison Buck	Jessica London-Shields	Jordan Clark
Chuck	Jack Corcoran	Richard Traub	Mike Handelman
Steve	Edgar Eguia	Jose Nateras	Noam Ash
Orcus/Ronnie	Raul Sigmund Julia	Morgan Maher	Stewart Evan Smith
Miles	Bruce A. Lemon	Fred Geyer	Jordan Sobel
Kaliope Darkwalker/Kelly	Megha Nabe	Rinska Carrasco-Prestinary	Adobuere Ebiama
Lilith Morningstar/Lilly	Margaret Odette	Sara Sawicki	Meredith Saran
Vera	Brett Ashley Robinson	Daeshawna Cook	Jamianne Devlin
Evil Tina	Brett Ashley Robinson	Allie Long	Kaitee Tredway
Farrah	Nicky Schmidlein	Allie Long	Kaitee Tredway
Evil Gabbi	Nicky Schmidlein	Ellie Reed	Jacqui Baker
Narrator	Nicky Schmidlein	Ellie Reed	Jacqui Baker

== Themes ==
In She Kills Monsters, Agnes discovers Tilly was a lesbian and used her Dungeons & Dragons campaign as an outlet for her struggles of being out in school, yet in the closet with her family. The play brings complex LGBTQ characters to the stage who fulfill goals outside of their sexuality and are well-rounded characters. The sexuality of characters is not the main focus of the play, which normalizes non-heterosexual characters. She Kills Monsters also goes through the storyline of coming out to close family, a difficult moment for those in the LGBTQ community. It creates a serious discussion on the understanding of people and the reactions that many experience when revealing their sexuality.

== Awards and nominations ==
=== Original Off-Broadway production ===
Year	Award	Category	Nominee	Result
2012	Drama Desk Awards	Outstanding Costume Design	Jessica Pabst	Nominated
2012	Drama Desk Awards	Outstanding Sound Design in a Play	Shane Rettig	Nominated
2012	GLAAD Media Awards	Outstanding New York Theater: Off-Off Broadway		Nominated
2012	ITBA Patrick Lee Award	Outstanding Off-Off Broadway Play		Nominated
