= The Bishop Misbehaves =

The Bishop Misbehaves may refer to:

- The Bishop Misbehaves (play), a 1934 play by Frederick Jackson
- The Bishop Misbehaves (film), a 1935 film directed by E.A. Dupont
