= Company One =

US non-profit theater company

Company One is a non-profit theater company located in the Boston Center for the Arts in Boston, Massachusetts, US. The company is known for socially conscious theater programming. Company One has produced more than 50 plays since 1998.

== Mission ==
Company One Theater's mission is to "build community at the intersection of art and social change".

== Company history ==
Company One was started by six individuals who founded a theater company called "Island Project" in Great Diamond Island, off the coast of Portland, Maine. They went on to found Company One in the fall of 1998.

In 2005, the company created ARTiculation, a touring poetry-slam turned performance piece. It premiered at the Boston Center of the Arts and has been touring throughout colleges and high schools across the east coast.

In 2010, Company One was awarded the American Theater Wing's National Theatre Company Grant.

In 2016 the company received grants which allowed it to take on a playwright in residence; the first playwright brought in was Kirsten Greenidge. Later that year the company presented "The T Party", a play about gender transformation.

== Education ==
=== Stage One ===
In 1999, Stage One began its summer camp at an independent site in the Boston area. Two years later, the summer program was invited to be a resident at the Coolidge Corner Theater, where the curriculum began to evolve into the more intensive training that it is today. In 2010, Stage One added an educational touring production to its roster of programs. The newest addition to the program is the Page to Stage Program, which brings middle and high school students into the Company One theater for special matinee performances. By 2012, the program had reached over 10,000 students.

=== Professional development ===
The company presents a professional development for professional actors, a class designed for adult actors perfecting their craft. It consists of eight weeks of study with Company One's instructors. The class culminates in a showcase.

Company One's summer production Apprentice Program offers pre-professional acting training and theater experience to teenaged apprentices. Participants train with Company One educators and create and perform their own performance pieces. They are also mentored by the company's professional production staff.

Company One also operates a nine-week theater intensive designed to give the insight and hands-on experience one might need to work in the professional theater. Apprentices participate in the creation and production of the professional play, performed by Company One's Junior Apprentice program for teens.

== Productions ==
=== Season 11: 2009/2011 ===
- The Overwhelming, by J.T. Rogers, directed by Shawn LaCount. October 30-November 21, 2009, at the Boston Center for the Arts, Plaza Theater.
- The Good Negro, by Tracey Scott Wilson, directed by Summer L. Williams, January 15-February 6, 2010, at the Boston Center for the Arts, Plaza Theater.
- Christmas Belles, by Jessie Jones, Nicholas Hope, and Jaime Wooten, and directed by Greg Maraio. December 4–15, 2009, at the Boston Playwrights' Theater.
- Apple, by Vern Thiessen, co-produced by Phoenix Theater Artists, directed by Greg Maraio. March 12-April 3, 2010, at the Boston Playwrights' Theatre. Introducing Canadian playwright, Vern Thiessen to Boston audiences.
- The Emancipation of Mandy and Miz Ellie, by Lois Roach, directed by Victoria Marsh, featuring OrigiNation Dance Troupe. April 30-May 22, 2010, at the Boston Center for the Arts, Plaza Theatre. New work by local playwright, Lois Roach.
- GRIMM, by Lydia R. Diamond, Marcus Gardley, Melinda Lopez, Kirsten Greenidge, John Kuntz, John ADEkoje and Gregory Maguire. Directed by Shawn LaCount and Summer L. Williams. June 16-August 14, 2010, at the Calderwood Pavilion, Roberts Theatre. A collection of short plays by Boston playwrights inspired by their favorite Grimm fairytales.

=== Season 12: 2010/2011 ===
- Neighbors, by Branden Jacobs-Jenkins directed by Summer L. Williams. January 14-February 5, 2011 at the Boston Center for the Arts, Plaza Theatre. Post show discussions facilitated by Interaction Institute for Social Change
- The Aliens, by Annie Baker, directed by Shawn LaCount. October 22-November 20, 2010 at the Calderwood Pavilion, Hall A. Produced in conjunction with the Huntington Theatre Company and Speakeasy Stage Company
- The Book of Grace, by Suzan-Lori Parks, directed by David Wheeler. April 15-May 7, 2011 at the Boston Center for the Arts, Plaza Theatre. New England Premier.
- Fringe Wars
- Learn to be Latina, by Enrique Urueta, directed by Greg Maraio. May 14-June 5, 2011 at the Boston Playwrights' Theatre.
- The Mountain Song, by PigPen Theatre Co. June 10–25, 2011 at the Calderwood Pavilion, Hall A. A representation of American Ensemble Theatre creating atmospheric theatrical fables blending live music, puppetry, shadow play, choreographed movement, and lighting effects. Received top honors at the 2012 NY Fringe Festival.
- 1001, by Jason Grote, directed by Megan Sandberg-Zakian. June 15-August 13, 2011 at the Boston Center for the Arts, Plaza Theatre. Reinvention of the Arabian Nights, bringing to life stories like Sinbad the Sailor and Aladdin and his Magic Lamp.

=== Season 13: 2011/2012 ===
- The Elaborate Entrance of Chad Deity, a Boston premier by Kristoffer Diaz, and directed by Shawn LaCount. July 28-August 25, 2012 at the Calderwood Pavilion Roberts Center at the Boston Center for the Arts. 2011 Obie Award for Best New American Play, and Pulitzer Prize Finalist
- The Brother/Sister Plays, by Tarell Alvin McCraney. October 28-December 3, 2011. A trilogy of plays (In the Red and Brown Water, The Brothers Size, Marcus; or the Secret of Sweet) presented in two parts. A modern-day story of kindship {What is kindship? This sounds rather pretentious.}, love, heartache, and coming-of-age.
- Green Eyes, a Company One Special Event, a Boston Premier by Tennessee Williams directed by Travis Chamberlain. Produced in collaboration with Chris Keegan and the Kindness. January 18-February 26, 2012 at the Ames Hotel, Court Street, Boston.
- Love Person, by Aditi Brennan Kapil, directed by M. Bevin O'Gara. May 25-June 23, 2012. A four-part love story told in Sanskrit, American Sign Language, English and Email.

=== Season 14: 2012/2013 ===
- No Room for Wishing a one-man documentary piece written and performed by Danny Bryck. Produced in collaboration with the Central Square Theatre.
- Bengal Tiger at the Baghdad Zoo, by Rajiv Joseph. October 19-November 17, 2012, at the Boston Center for the Arts.
- You for Me for You, by Mia Chung. Opens January 18, 2013.
- XX Playlab. A celebration of female playwrights on the local and national level. Plays by Lydia R. Diamond, Kirsten Greednidge, and Natalia Naman Temesgen.
- She Kills Monsters, by Qui Ngyuen.
- How we got on, by rapper/MC/slam poet/playwright Idris Goodwin.

=== Season 15: 2013/2014 ===
- Astroboy and the God of Comics conceived and directed by Natsu Onoda Power. July 18, 2014 – August 16, 2014 and the Boston Center for the Arts
- XX Playlab, A celebration of female playwrights on the local and national level. Plays by Natsu Onoda Power, Obehi Janice, Kirsten Greenidge and Miranda Craigwell.
- The Flick, by Annie Baker. February 20 – March 15, 2014 Presented with Suffolk University at the Modern Theatre
- We Are Proud to Present a Presentation... by Jackie Sibblies Drury. A co-production with ArtsEmerson, January 10 – February 1, 2014 and the Paramount Center
- Splendor, a World Premiere by Kirsten Greenidge. October 18 – November 16, 2013 at the Boston Center for the Arts

=== Season 16: 2014/2015 ===
- Colossal, an NNPN Rolling World Premiere by Andrew Hinderaker. July 17 – August 15, 2015 at the Boston Center for the Arts
- Edith Can Shoot Things and Hit Them, by A. Rey Pamatmat June 4, 2015 – June 27, 2015 at the Calderwood Pavilion
- Shockheaded Peter, created for the stage by Julian Crouch and Phelim McDermott. Original music and lyrics by The Tiger Lillies. Boston production music developed by Walter Sickert and the Army of Broken Toys
- The Displaced Hindu Gods Trilogy, by Aditi Brennan Kapil October 24, 2014 – November 22, 2014 at the Boston Center for the Arts

=== Season 17: 2015/2016 ===
- The T Party, conceived and directed by Natsu Onoda Power. July 15-August 13, 2016 at the Boston Center for the Arts
- We're Gonna Die, by Young Jean Lee, starring Obehi Janice April 20–29, 2016, presented in collaboration with American Repertory Theater. Touring presentations at Dudley Cafe (Roxbury, Boston,) Zumix (East Boston,) AS220 (Providence,) Luna Theater (Lowell, MA) The Urbano Project (Jamaica Plain)
- An Octoroon, by Branden Jacobs Jenkins. January 29 – February 27, 2016 A co-production with ArtsEmerson at the Paramount Center
- Dry Land, by Ruby Rae Spiegel October 2 – 30, 2015 at the Boston Center for the Arts

=== Season 18: 2016/2017 ===
- peerless, by Jiehae Park. April 27 – May 27, 2017, presented in collaboration with the Boston Public Library
- Really, by Jackie Sibblies Drury, In Partnership with Matter & Light Fine Art January 25 – March 5, 2017
- Every 28 Hours, in collaboration with Oregon Shakespeare Festival and the One-Minute Play Festival. November 5, 2016 at the Boston Museum of Fine Arts
- Revolt. She Said. Revolt Again., by Alice Birch. October 21 – November 19, 2016 at the Boston Center for the Arts
- We're Gonna Die, (The Afterlife Remount) by Young Jean Lee, starring Obehi Janice. October 4–8, 2016, presented in collaboration with American Repertory Theater.

=== Season 23: 2022 ===
- Black Super Hero Magic Mama by Inda Craig-Galván April 22 – May 21st 2022.
- can i touch it? by Francisca Da Silveira July 15 – August 13, 2022.

== Awards and nominations ==
- The Brother/Sister Plays: Elliot Norton Awards - Hampton Fluker, Winner Outstanding Actor, Small/Fringe Theater; Nominated, Outstanding Production, Small Theater. IRNE Awards - Winner Best Play (Midsize); Hampton Fluker, Winner Best Supporting Actor (Drama); James Milord, Nominated for Best Actor (Drama)
- Green Eyes: Elliot Norton Awards - - Erin Markey, Winner Outstanding Actress, Small/Fringe Theater; Nominated for Outstanding Production, Small Theater
- The Aliens: Elliot Norton Awards - - Shawn LaCount, Winner Outstanding Director, Small/Fringe Theater; Cristina Todesco, Bobby Frederick, Aaron Mack, Benjamin Williams; Winner Outstanding Design, Midsize/Small/Fringe Theater; Winner Outstanding Production, Small/Fringe Theater; Alex Pollock, Winner Outstanding Actor, Small/Fringe Theater. IRNE Awards - Nominated for Best Small Production
- Neighbors: Elliot Norton Awards - Christine Power, Nominated for Outstanding Actress, Small/Fringe Theater
- After the Quake: Elliot Norton Awards - Nominated for Outstanding Production by a Fringe Company
- The Overwhelming: Elliot Norton Awards - Nominated for Outstanding Production by a Fringe Company
- Voyeurs de Venus: Elliot Norton Awards - Summer L. Williams, Winner Outstanding Director, Small/Fringe Company; Nominated for Outstanding Production by a Fringe Company. IRNE Awards - Marvelyn McFarlane, Nominated for Supporting Actress (Drama)
- Mr. Marmalade: Elliot Norton Awards - Shawn LaCount, Nominated for Outstanding Director, Small/Fringe Company; Nominated for Outstanding Production by a Fringe Company. IRNE Awards - Nominated for Best Drama; Rachel Hunt, Nominated for Best Actress (Drama)
- The Bluest Eye: Elliot Norton Awards - Nominated for Outstanding Production by a Fringe Company. IRNE Awards - Marvelyn McFarlane, Nominated for Supporting Actress (Drama); Summer L. Williams, Nominated for Best Director, Drama
- Jesus Hopped the 'A' Train: Elliot Norton Awards - - Winner, Best Fringe Production
- The Book of Grace: IRNE Awards - David Wheeler, Winner Best Director of a Drama (Midsize); Frances Idlebrook, Nominated Best Actress (Drama); Nominated for Best Play (Midsize)
- The Mountain Song: IRNE Awards - with Pig Pen Theatre Company, Winner Best Visiting Production
- GRIMM:IRNE Awards - Nominated for Best New Play; Becca A. Lewis, Winner Best Supporting Actress (Drama)
- The Emancipation of Mandy and Miz Ellie: IRNE Awards - Alvin Terry, Nominated for Music Director
- The Good Negro: IRNE Awards - Marvelyn McFarlane, Nominated for Best Actress (Drama); Kris Sidberry, Nominated for Best Supporting Actress (Drama)
- The Pain and The Itch: IRNE Awards - Bevin O'Gara, Nominated for Best Director; Aimee Doherty, Nominated for Best Supporting Actress; Nominated for Best Ensemble
- The Superheroine Monologues: IRNE Awards - Greg Maraio, Winner Best Costumes; Nominated for Best New Play
- Assassins: IRNE Awards - Mason Sand, Winner Supporting Actor, Musical; Shawn LaCount, Nominated for Best Director of a Musical; Nominated for Best Musical.
