= James Earl Jones Theatre =

Broadway theater in Manhattan, New York

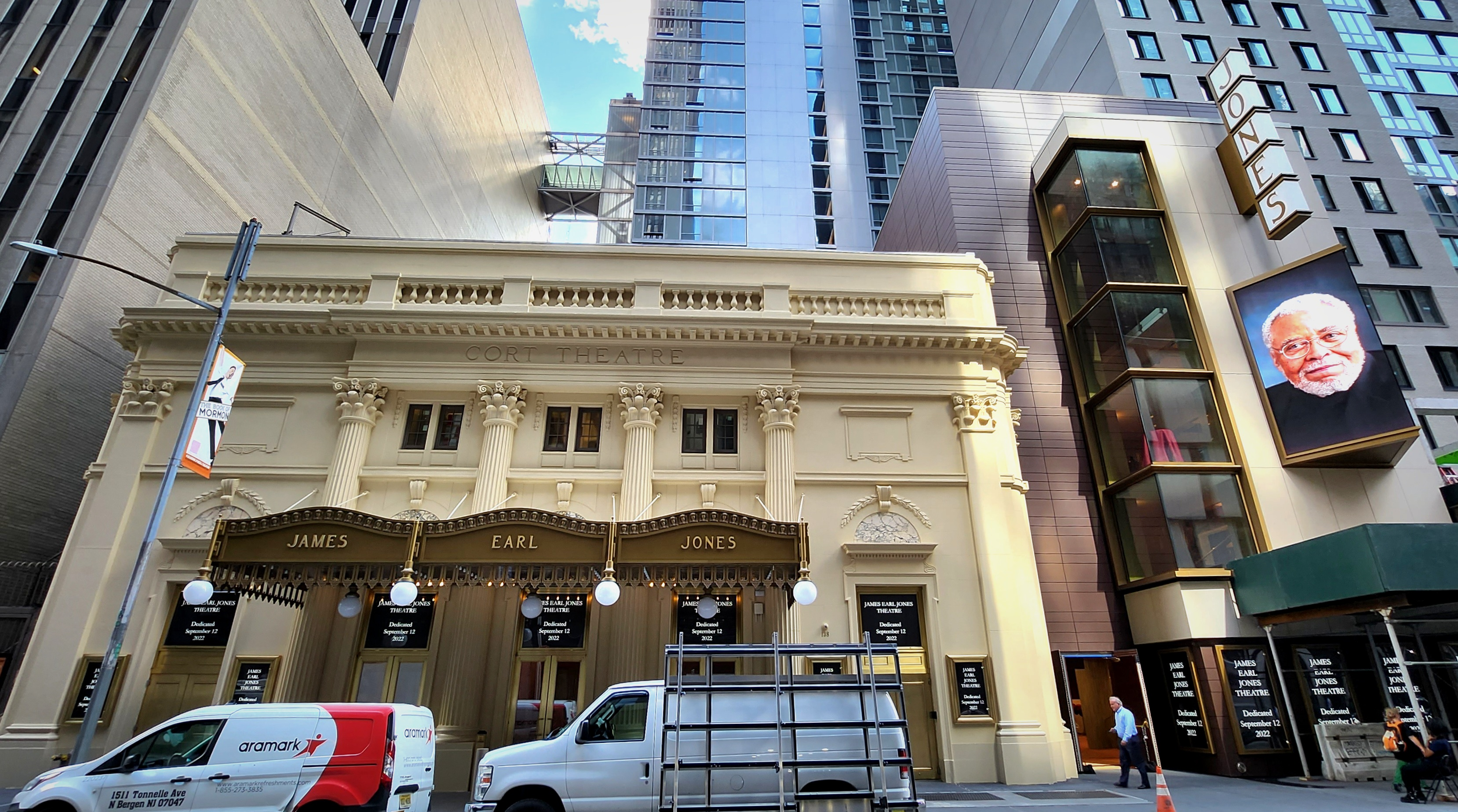
- Interactive map of James Earl Jones Theatre
- Former names: Cort Theatre (1912–2022)
- Address: 138 West 48th Street; Manhattan, New York, U.S.
- Coordinates: 40°45′33″N 73°58′59″W
- Owner: The Shubert Organization
- Capacity: 1,092
- Type: Broadway
- Production: Wanted: The Legend of the Sisters Clarke

Construction
- Opened: December 20, 1912 (113 years ago)
- Rebuilt: 2021–2022
- Years active: 1912–1969, 1972–present
- Architect: Thomas W. Lamb

Website
- shubert.nyc/theatres/james-earl-jones/

New York City Landmark
- Designated: November 17, 1987
- Reference no.: 1328
- Designated entity: Facade

New York City Landmark
- Designated: November 17, 1987
- Reference no.: 1329
- Designated entity: Lobby and auditorium interior

The James Earl Jones Theatre, originally the Cort Theatre, is a Broadway theater at 138 West 48th Street, between Seventh Avenue and Sixth Avenue, in the Theater District of Midtown Manhattan in New York City, New York, U.S. It was built in 1912 and designed by architect Thomas W. Lamb for impresario John Cort. An annex west of the original theater, built between 2021 and 2022, was designed by Kostow Greenwood Architects. The Jones has 1,092 seats across three levels and is operated by the Shubert Organization. Both the facade and interior of the theater are New York City designated landmarks.

The theater maintains much of its original neoclassical design. Its 48th Street facade has a glass-and-metal marquee shielding the entrances, as well as a colonnade with an additional story above. The lobby has marble paneling and a coved ceiling. The auditorium contains a ground-level orchestra and two overhanging balconies with boxes. The auditorium's proscenium arch is designed with "art glass" that can illuminate during performances, and its ceiling is coved. The western annex contains lounges, restrooms, and backstage areas.

John Cort received the rights to operate the theater in January 1912, and the Cort Theatre opened on December 20, 1912. Despite being regarded by the theatrical community as being on the "wrong side" of Broadway, the Cort hosted numerous hit productions during its early years. The Shubert Organization purchased the theater in 1927, two years before Cort's death. Though the theater was used as a television studio for The Merv Griffin Show from 1969 to 1972, it has mostly remained in theatrical use through the years. The Cort closed temporarily in 2020 during the COVID-19 pandemic and was renovated during that time. In 2022, the theater was renamed after actor James Earl Jones, becoming the second Broadway venue named after a Black theatrical personality.

== Site ==
The James Earl Jones Theatre is a Broadway theater on 138 West 48th Street, on the south sidewalk between Seventh Avenue and Sixth Avenue (near Times Square), in the Theater District of Midtown Manhattan in New York City, New York, U.S. The rectangular land lot covers 12,010 square feet (1,116 m^{2}), with a frontage of 120 feet (37 m) on 48th Street and a depth of 100.42 feet (31 m). Nearby buildings include Hard Rock Hotel New York and 745 Seventh Avenue to the north, 1221 Avenue of the Americas to the northeast, 1211 Avenue of the Americas to the east, the Church of St. Mary the Virgin to the south, the Palace Theatre and TSX Broadway to the southwest, and 20 Times Square to the west.

== Design ==
The James Earl Jones Theatre, designed by Thomas W. Lamb in the neoclassical style for impresario John Cort, was constructed in 1912. The venue is one of Lamb's few remaining theater buildings. Although Edward B. Corey was frequently credited as the architect, Lamb was the architect of record. and William Crawford was the general contractor for the project. An annex directly to the west was designed by Kostow Greenwood Architects and was built between 2021 and 2022.

=== Facade ===
==== Original theater ====
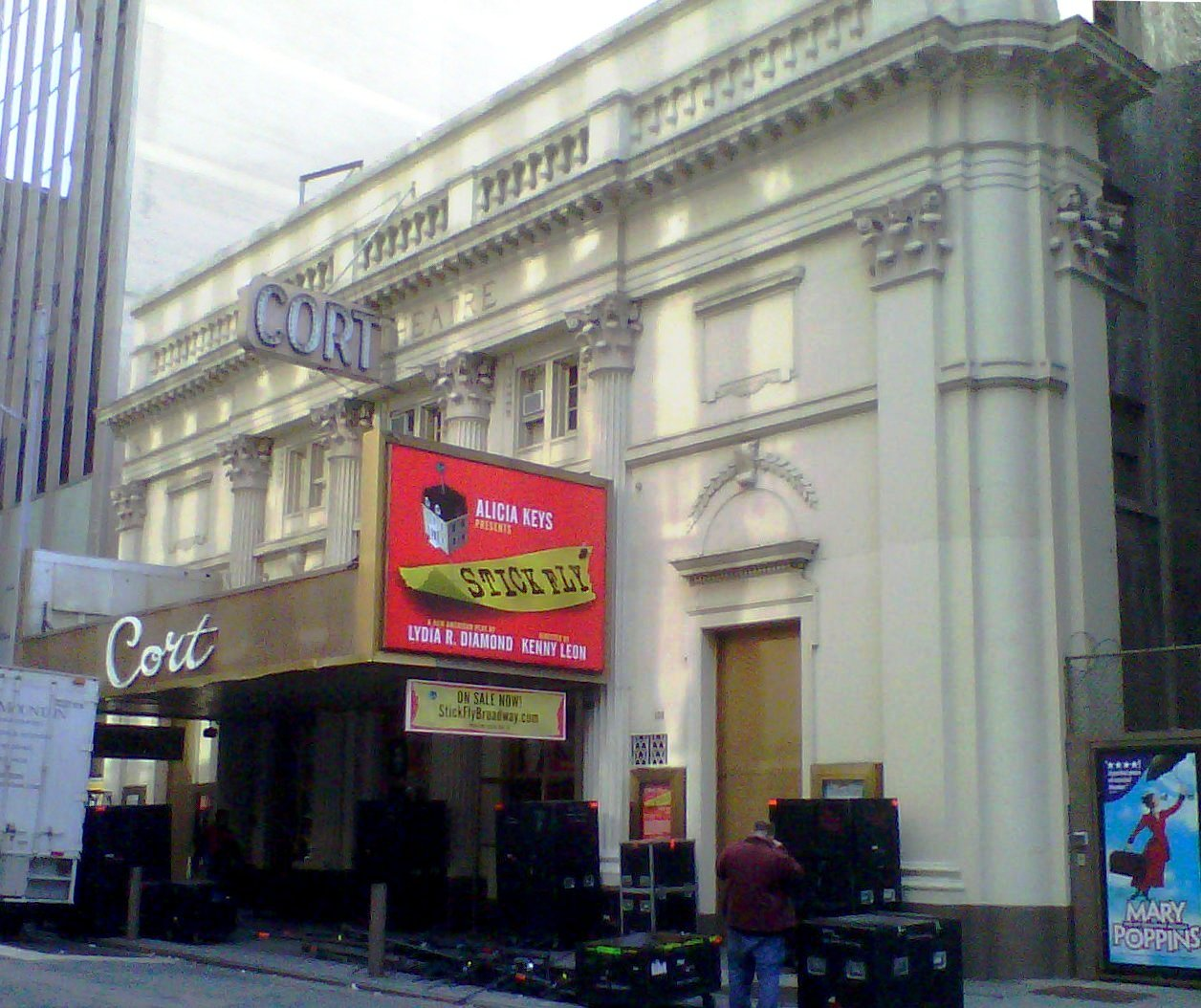
Facade seen in November 2011, with the old marquee in place

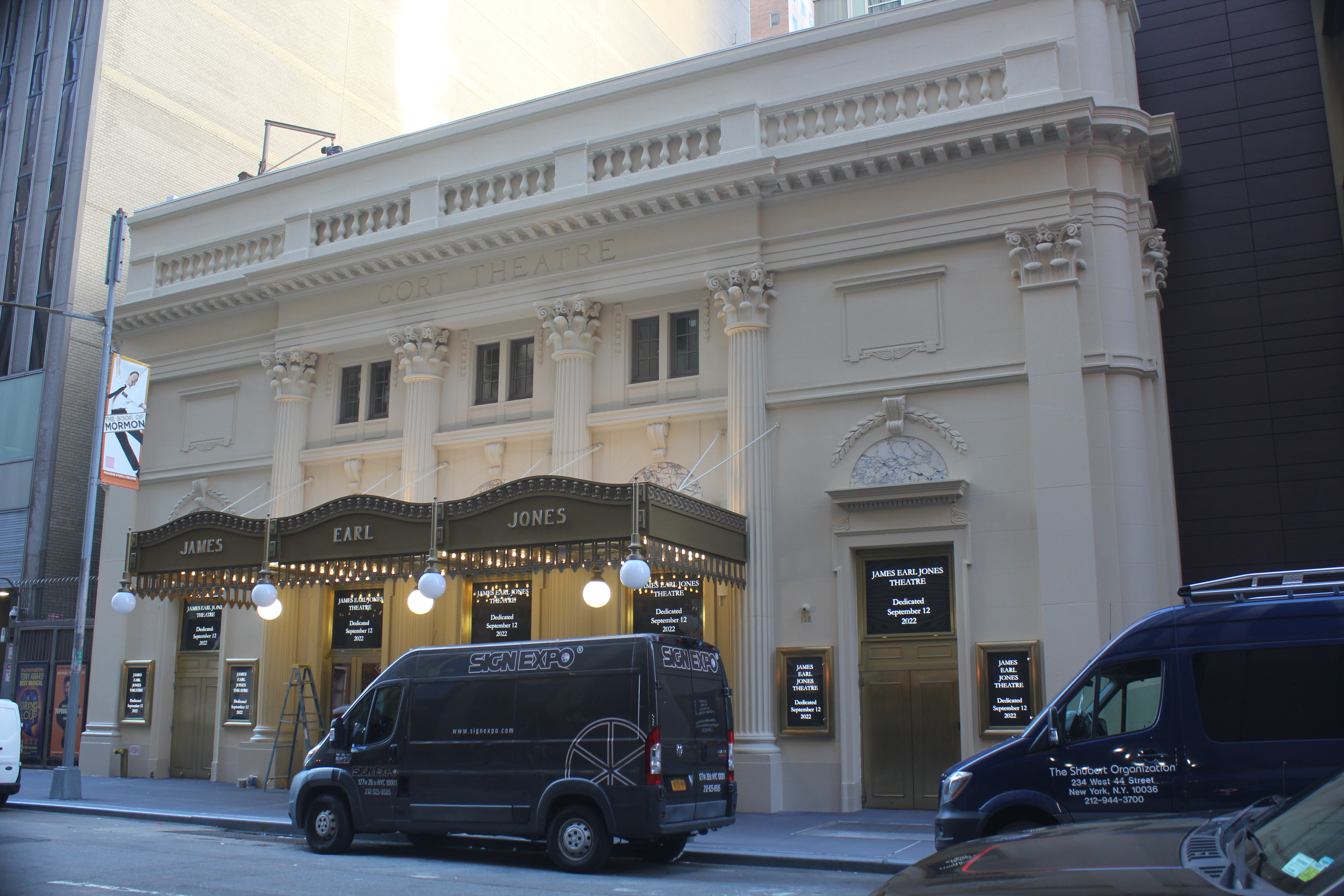
Same view in September 2022

The main elevation of the Jones's facade faces north on 48th Street and is made of marble, with a layer of stone underlying it. The original two-story theater facade is split into a central pavilion with a colonnade of three bays; the central colonnade is flanked by one additional bay to either side. The facade was modeled on the Petit Trianon, an 18th-century neoclassical chateau at Versailles. A contemporary New-York Tribune article characterized the main facade elevation as being designed in the Louis XVI style.

The central pavilion contains four fluted engaged columns with Corinthian-style capitals. At ground level, each of the three center bays contains a set of double doors made of glass and aluminum, above which is a marquee. The original marquee had three Art Nouveau arches, but it was replaced in the 20th century with a boxy structure with signs on either side. A new marquee, similar in design to the original, was installed in 2021; it contains three arches framed by metal shield decorations, as well as four spherical lamps hanging from the marquee. Above the marquee are arches topped by bracket-shaped keystones. A transom bar runs horizontally above the keystones, above which are slightly recessed pairs of windows, flanked by bellflowers.

The outer bays contain aluminum double doors, with display boxes on either side of and above the doors. The doorways contain eared architraves and are topped by cornices. Above the cornices are round-arched panels, with keystones flanked by laurel leaves. The outer bays contain carved panels, rather than windows, on the upper story. The northwest and northeast corners of the theater's facade are curved. Each end of the north elevation contains a Corinthian pilaster, and the northern ends of the west and east elevations also contain a pilaster. An entablature runs above the upper story of the facade, wrapping around the curved corners to the northwest and northeast. Atop the central columns, the entablature has an inscription with the original "Cort Theatre" name. A neon sign with the "Cort" name had been installed in front of the frieze in 1937; it was removed during the 2021 renovation. Above the entablature is a parapet with modillions and a blind balustrade.

==== Annex ====
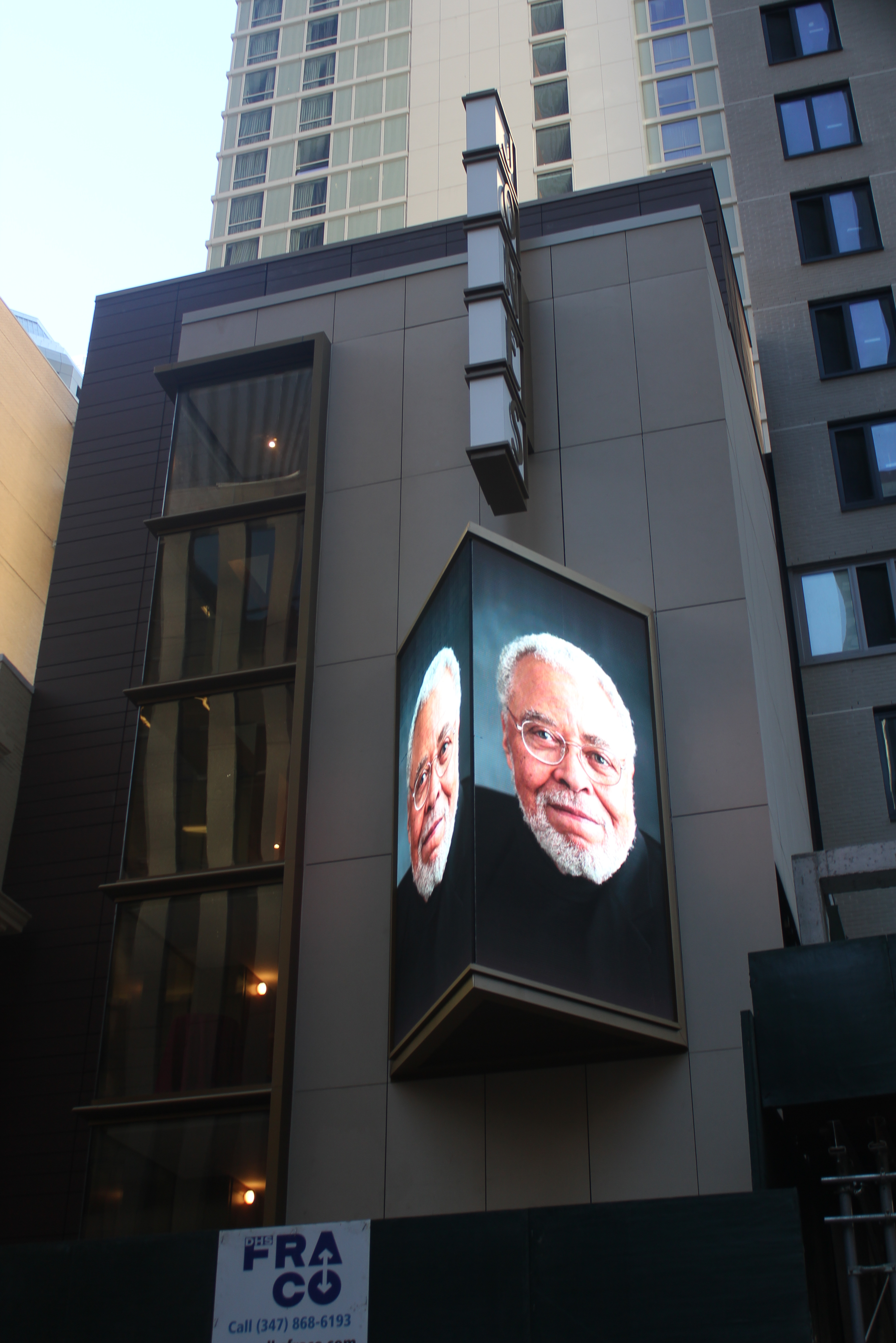
Annex facade

The western annex, measuring 35 feet (11 m) wide, was built between 2021 and 2022. The annex is about 74 feet (23 m) tall, with five stories; the elevator shaft in the annex rises to 80 feet (24 m). A recessed brown-granite bay at the end of the alley connects the annex and original theater. The annex's elevator shaft is about 30 feet above the roof of the original theater. Unlike the original facade, it has a modern design with cream-colored terracotta facade panels interspersed with polished brownstone pieces. There are glass display boxes at ground level, as well as a glazed window at the eastern corner of the annex's upper stories. There is also an LED sign on the exterior of the annex's upper stories.

=== Interior ===
The Jones's interior design is credited to Arthur Brunet, according to a promotional booklet from the theater's opening. While the interior was not similar to that of the Petit Trianon, the design features are from the same era, the 17th century. The interior color scheme was described in the booklet as having "a blending of old rose and gold" and plaster decoration "in complimentary [sic] colors of champagne and sienna".

==== Lobby ====
The entrance lobby is a rectangular space accessed from 48th Street. The lobby is laid in white Pavanozza marble with plasterwork panels. Tiffany Studios was credited with the design of the lobby. The walls of the lobby contain a dado of Pavanozza marble, which surrounds the entire room. The north doors lead to the street, while three doors on the south wall connect to the auditorium. The south doors are surrounded by plaster frames, above which are entablatures and pediments with cartouches. There is a niche on the east wall, which contains a pedestal with a bust of Marie Antoinette. The west wall has box-office windows with marble frames. The box office's metalwork originally was made of bronze with gold and enamel reliefs. The lobby has a coved ceiling with raised-plaster motifs and a central medallion with a chandelier made of bronze and crystal. There is no accessible restroom in the original lobby.

==== Auditorium ====
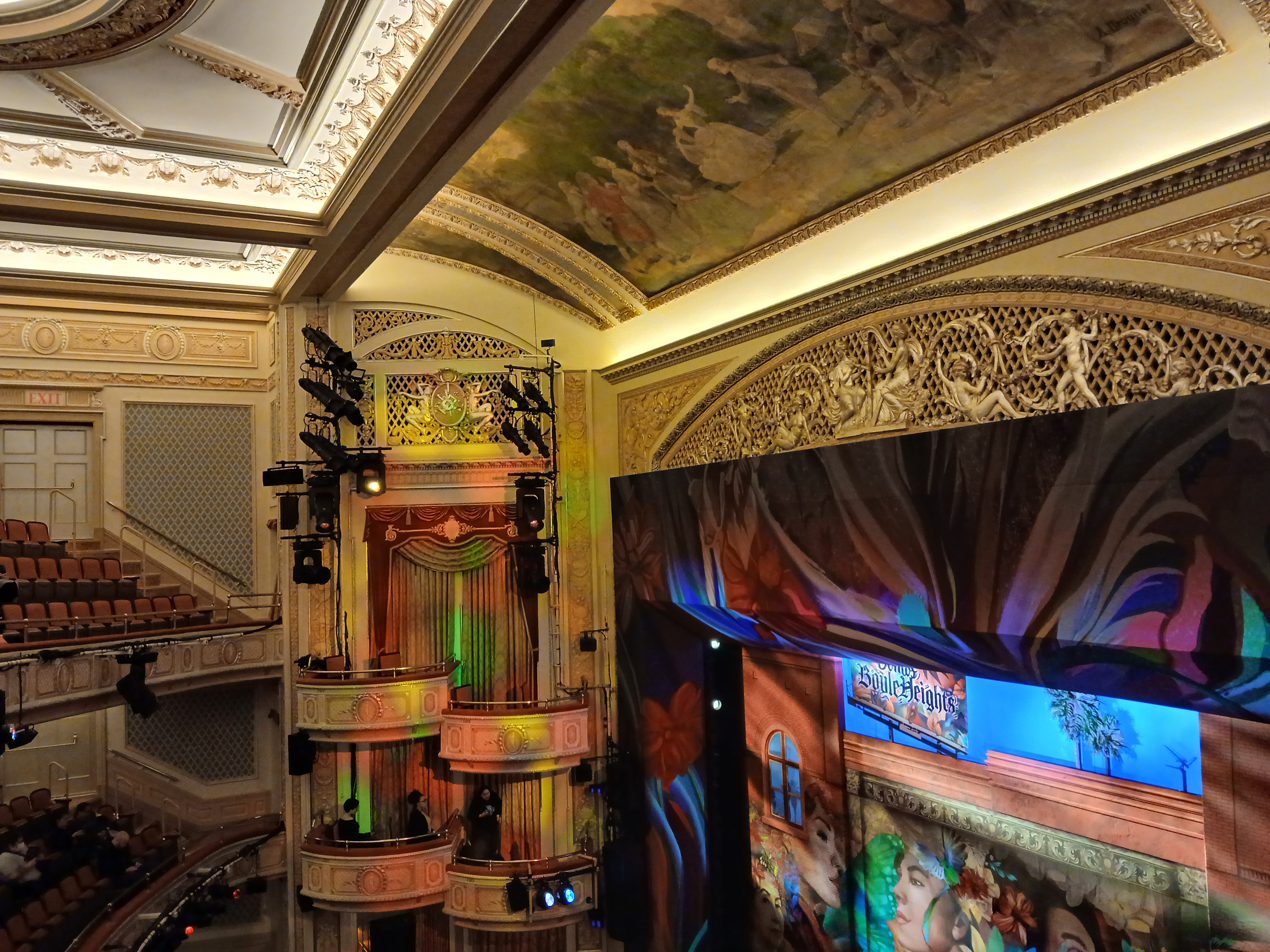
Auditorium interior

The auditorium has an orchestra level, two balconies, boxes, and a stage behind the proscenium arch. The auditorium is square in layout and is designed with plaster decorations in high relief. The Jones's operator The Shubert Organization cites the auditorium as having 1,092 seats; meanwhile, The Broadway League cites a figure of 1,084 seats and Playbill gives a figure of 1,049. These are divided into 502 seats in the orchestra, 264 on the first balcony, and 263 on the second balcony, as well as 24 box seats and 19 standing-only spots. The Cort was originally a 999-seat venue when it opened in 1912.

===== Seating areas =====
The rear (north) end of the orchestra contains a promenade, which has doorways with eared architraves on the rear wall, as well as plain doorways on the side walls. The orchestra has a raked floor and wainscoted walls, with paneling above the wainscoting. Staircases with iron railings lead from the orchestra to the balconies. The orchestra level is wheelchair-accessible via the main doors, but the balcony levels could only be accessed by steps prior to the annex's construction. The rears of the balconies have promenades with standing rails. The balcony levels have doorways with eared architraves on the side walls. The second balcony's walls are topped by friezes with swags and cameo panels. The balconies have floral moldings on the fronts of their undersides, with crystal light fixtures underneath. Air conditioning grilles are placed below the balconies.

On either side of the stage is a wall section with two boxes each at the first and second balcony level. Each wall section is flanked by Adam-style panels. The boxes themselves are curved and contain latticework and cameo decorations on the front railings. Under each box is a molding and a medallion holding a chandelier. Above each pair of second-balcony boxes, there is an eared architrave, as well as a latticework panel that depicts female figures flanking swags and a cartouche. Originally, the auditorium had twelve boxes (four on each level), but the boxes at orchestra level were removed. Instead of an orchestra pit, there was a Wurlitzer organ that a single musician could operate. The organ was an Opus 20 model with three manuals and thirteen ranks.

===== Other design features =====
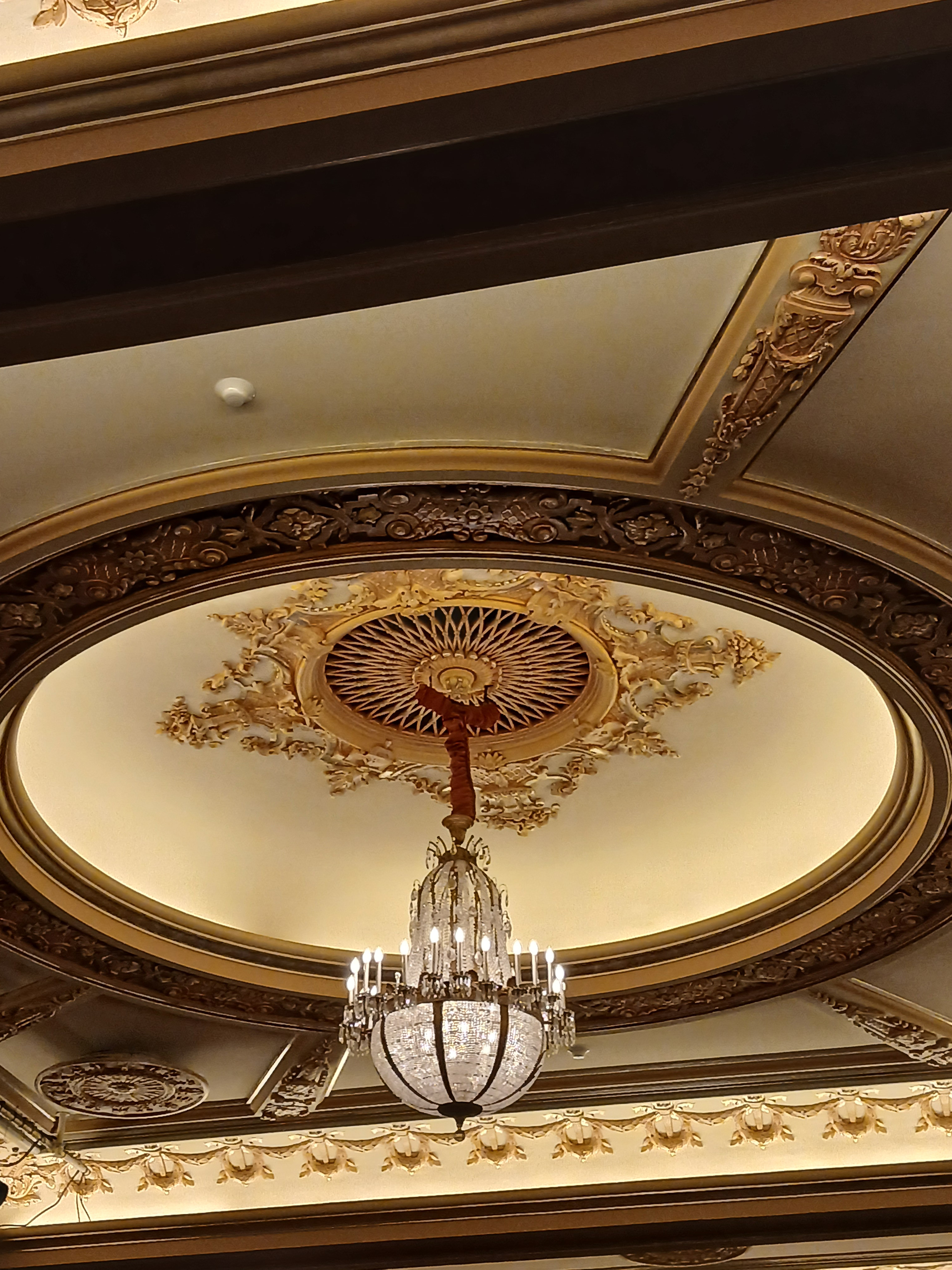
The ceiling chandelier

The proscenium arch measures 29 feet 0 inches (8.84 m) high and 37 feet 5 inches (11.40 m) wide. It consists of latticed plasterwork with art glass beneath it. The art glass was capable of illumination, but the illumination was then turned off until the theater was renovated in 2021. The sides of the arch have swags and medallions. Above the center of the arch, and within the spandrels, there are depictions of putti and muses entangled in vines. There is a cornice with modillions and dentils above the arch. The sounding board curves onto the ceiling above the proscenium arch and is divided into three sections. The sounding board depicts a minuet that, according to the New-York Tribune, had been made "during the period made famous in [Antoine] Watteau's drawings of French court life at Versailles". The depth of the auditorium to the proscenium is 28 feet 10 inches (8.79 m), while the depth to the front of the stage is 33 feet 5 inches (10.19 m).

The ceiling is divided into three rectangular sections, which are recessed coves. The ribs of the ceiling, which separate the coves, are decorated with swags and wreaths. The center section contains a circular dome, which has a frieze extending outward, as well as an overhanging bronze and crystal chandelier at the center. Three additional panels, similar in design, hang over the second balcony.

==== Annex ====
The Jones's annex contains a superstructure of concrete and covers 20,000 square feet (1,900 m^{2}). The annex has accessible bathrooms, concession areas, lounge, dressing rooms, and rehearsal space. A grand staircase connects the lounges on three stories of the annex, with views of 48th Street. An elevator is being placed in the annex to allow wheelchair access into the auditorium's balconies. The annex is connected to the existing theater via new door openings. With the construction of the annex, the stage-left wing was also expanded into the annex.

== History ==
Times Square became the epicenter for large-scale theater productions between 1900 and the Great Depression. Manhattan's theater district had begun to shift from Union Square and Madison Square during the first decade of the 20th century. From 1901 to 1920, forty-three theaters were built around Broadway in Midtown Manhattan, including the Cort Theatre. John Cort was a theatrical operator who had become highly successful on the West Coast of the United States, with 150 theaters at his peak, and came to New York City in 1905. Cort had, in 1910, become president of the National Theatre Owners' Association, a group of circuits that tried to break away from the New York-based syndicates like the Klaw and Erlanger circuit. It was in this capacity that Cort decided to build new theaters in New York City.

=== Cort operation ===
==== Development and early years ====
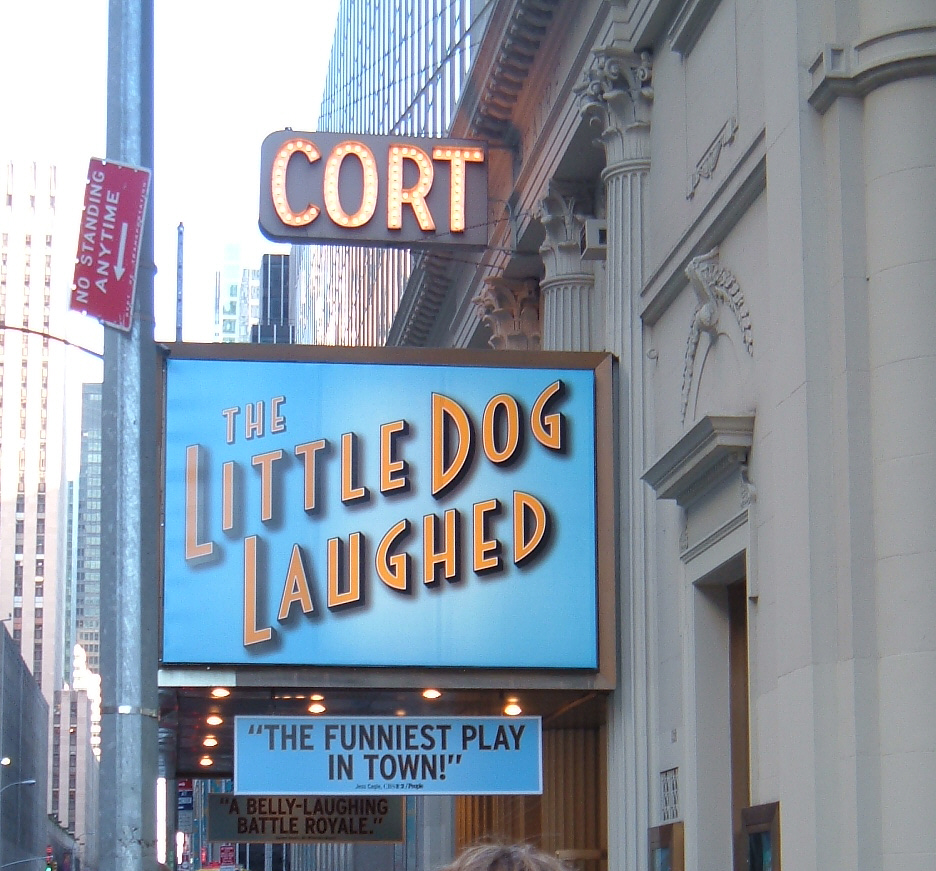
The Cort Theatre marquee prior to the 2021 renovation

Edward B. Corey acquired the lots on 138–146 West 48th Street and leased them to Cort for 21 years starting in January 1912. Thomas Lamb was hired to design a theater there. That March, Cort announced that he would erect two theaters in New York City: the Cort Theatre on 48th Street and the Illington Theatre on 46th Street. The design of the Cort was so important that the specifications for the theater's design were encoded in the lease agreement. Namely, the design features could not be "inferior" to those in the now-demolished Playhouse Theatre across the street. By that June, the production Peg o' My Heart featuring Laurette Taylor had been scheduled for the Cort. The opening of the theater was originally scheduled for November 1912.

The Cort opened on December 20, 1912, with Peg o' My Heart. Theatrical critics of the time considered the Cort to be physically on the "wrong side" of Broadway; whereas most contemporary theaters were west of that street, the Cort was to the east. Nonetheless, the theater was described in a contemporary media source as "one of the most exquisitely beautiful playhouses in Manhattan". Theatre magazine wrote of the Cort's "sweeping, commanding lines, comfortable seats and admirable acoustic properties. If any exception is to be taken, it is that pink is too delicate a shade for such an expanse of decoration."

Peg o' My Heart had over 600 performances, a major accomplishment for the time, when 100 performances constituted a hit. In 1913, Cort gave Oliver Morosco the exclusive rights to show plays at his namesake theater for five years. After Peg o' My Heart ended, the Mutual Film Corporation temporarily used the Cort as a cinema in mid-1914. The venue then hosted three hit productions: Under Cover (1914), The Princess Pat (1915), and His Majesty Bunker Bean (1915–1916). Due to the large number of early hits at the Cort, it was quickly perceived among the theatrical community as a "lucky" venue.

==== Late 1910s and early 1920s ====
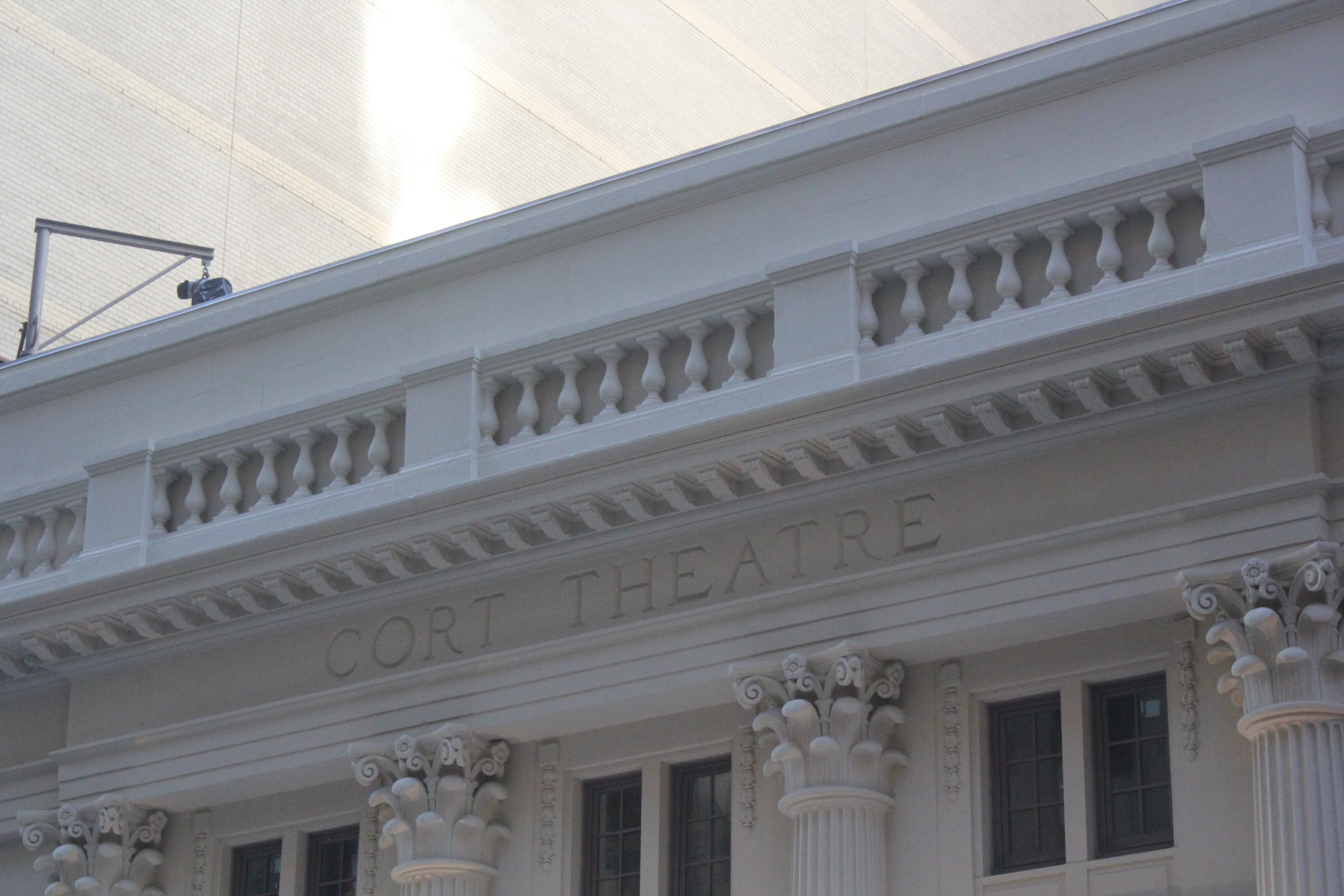
Detail of cornice and attic

The theater presented John Cort's productions, as well as those of other producers such as Morosco, the Shubert family, the Selwyn family, and Arthur Hammerstein, in its early years. Molly O' and Upstairs and Down, as well as the hit The Yellow Jacket, performed at the Cort during 1916. The following year, the venue hosted Mother Carey's Chickens and Flo-Flo, the latter of which had 220 performances. The Cort then hosted several of Shakespeare's plays in early 1918. The theater's final hit of the 1910s was Abraham Lincoln, which opened in 1919. The Cort continued to host hits through the following decade. These included Jim Jam Jems (1920), with Joe E. Brown; Captain Applejack (1921); Merton of the Movies (1922); and The Swan (1923), with Basil Rathbone and Eva Le Gallienne. Other events of the early 1920s included a seance performed by John Armstrong Chaloner in 1921, as well as benefit performances such as Mu Lan (1921) and Book of Job (1922).

The theater had a series of short-lived productions in 1924. More successful was the play The Second Mrs. Tanqueray (1924), with Ethel Barrymore and Henry Daniell, and the comedy White Collars (1925). These were followed by another set of productions with short runs. A dispute arose in October 1925 when three producers sued each other, alleging that Cort had granted each of them the right to use the theater during the same time period. Judge Thomas D. Thacher, of the United States District Court for the Southern District of New York, issued two injunctions: one granting production rights to Jane, Our Stranger, and another that canceled that production after four performances. Other hits of the mid-1920s included The Jazz Singer, which was transferred to the Cort in late 1925, as well as The Little Spitfire, which opened in 1926. The 1926 play Beyond Evil, which discussed interracial marriage, nearly prompted a riot when it was performed at the Cort.

=== Shubert operation ===
==== 1920s to 1960s ====
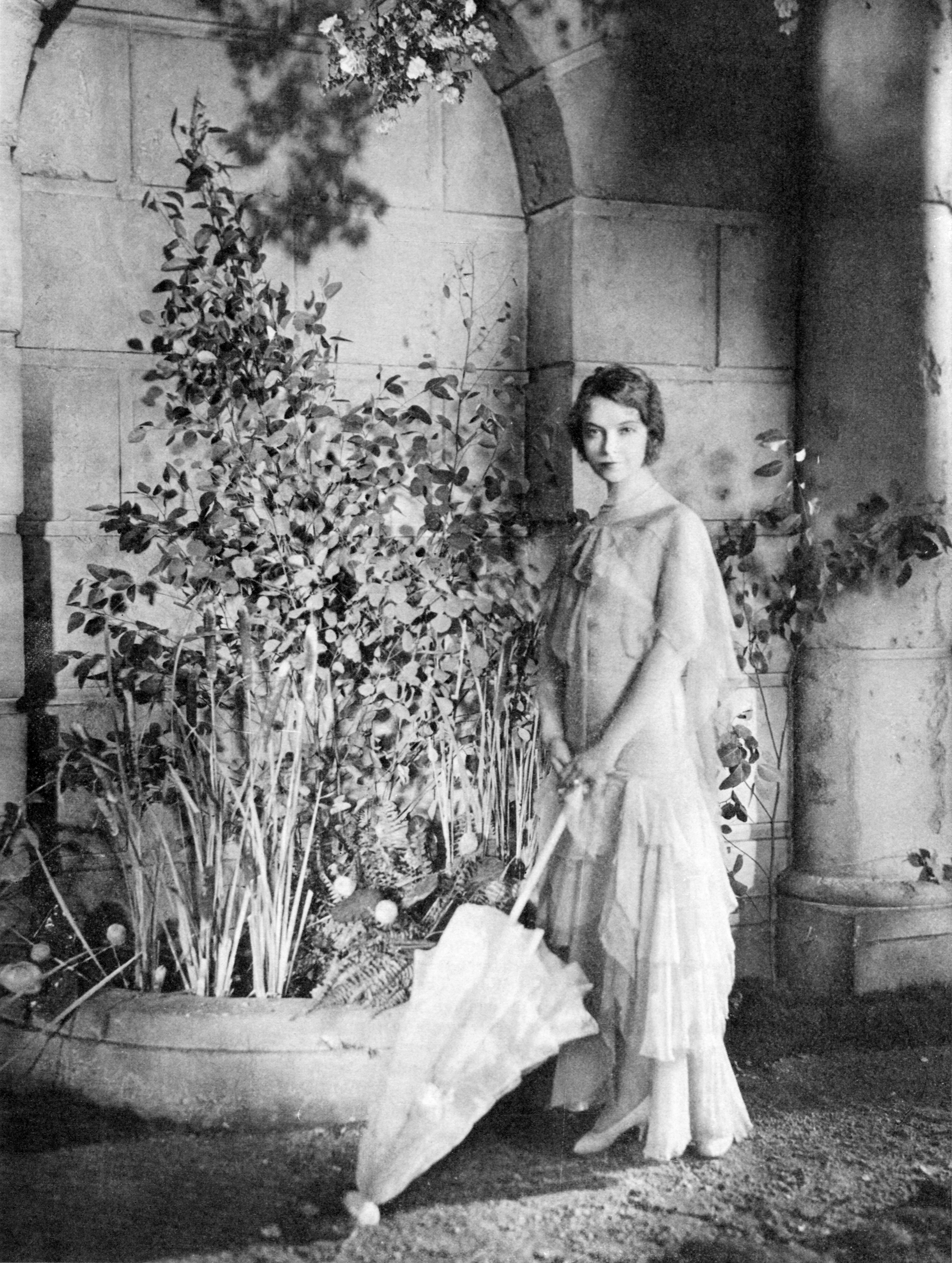
Lillian Gish in the Cort's 1930 production of Uncle Vanya

In May 1927, the Shubert Organization purchased the theater from Edward B. Corey, subject to a mortgage of $210,000. The Shuberts took over the operation from Cort, who retired afterward. Joseph Leblang and his representatives then operated the venue from August 1928 to December 1932. The 1928 drama These Days, which had eight performances at the Cort, was Katharine Hepburn's first Broadway appearance. Subsequently, the theater hosted A Most Immoral Lady in 1928 with Alice Brady, as well as Your Uncle Dudley in 1929 with Walter Connolly. The Cort hosted Jed Harris's revival of the play Uncle Vanya in 1930, along with the hit production Five Star Final the same year. In addition to theatrical performances, the Cort hosted events like an opera in 1927 and a folk-song recital in 1930.

Richard Aldrich and Alfred De Liagre made their production debut in 1933 with Three-Cornered Moon. Two hits followed: The Green Bay Tree in 1933 and The Bishop Misbehaves in 1935. Two plays by George Abbott took up the Cort during most of the next three years: Boy Meets Girl (1935) and Room Service (1937), both of which had hundreds of performances. Several major productions followed, including The White Steed (1939), The Male Animal (1940), Charley's Aunt (1940), Cafe Crown (1942), The Eve of St. Mark (1942), and A Bell for Adano (1944). During 1946, the Theatre Guild's Shakespearean Repertory Company appeared in The Winter's Tale; Katharine Cornell produced and starred in Antigone and Candida; and Estelle Winwood and Cornelia Otis Skinner starred in Lady Windermere's Fan. This was followed in 1948 by the hits The Respectful Prostitute and Two Blind Mice. The 1949 production of The Father featured Grace Kelly's Broadway debut.

Even in the 1950s, the Cort continued to present long-running productions. The Theatre Guild returned in 1950, presenting As You Like It. This was followed by several hits such as Saint Joan (1951), The Shrike (1952), The Fifth Season (1953), and The Rainmaker (1954). Another major production was The Diary of Anne Frank, which opened in 1955 and played the Cort for over a year before relocating. Another major productions of the late 1950s was The Rope Dancers in 1957. The play Sunrise at Campobello opened in 1958 with Henry Jones, Mary Fickett, and Anne Seymour, as well as James Earl Jones in his Broadway debut; it had well over 500 performances.

The Cort hosted several productions in the early 1960s, including The Hostage and Advise and Consent in 1960, as well as Purlie Victorious and Sunday in New York in 1961. For the rest of the decade, the Cort had many productions, few of which were hits. In May 1962, the Royal Dramatic Theatre of Sweden had a brief engagement with The Father, Long Day's Journey into Night, and Miss Julie in repertory. The next year saw a relatively unsuccessful adaptation of One Flew Over the Cuckoo's Nest; this was followed in 1965 by The Zulu and the Zayda.

==== 1970s to 1990s ====
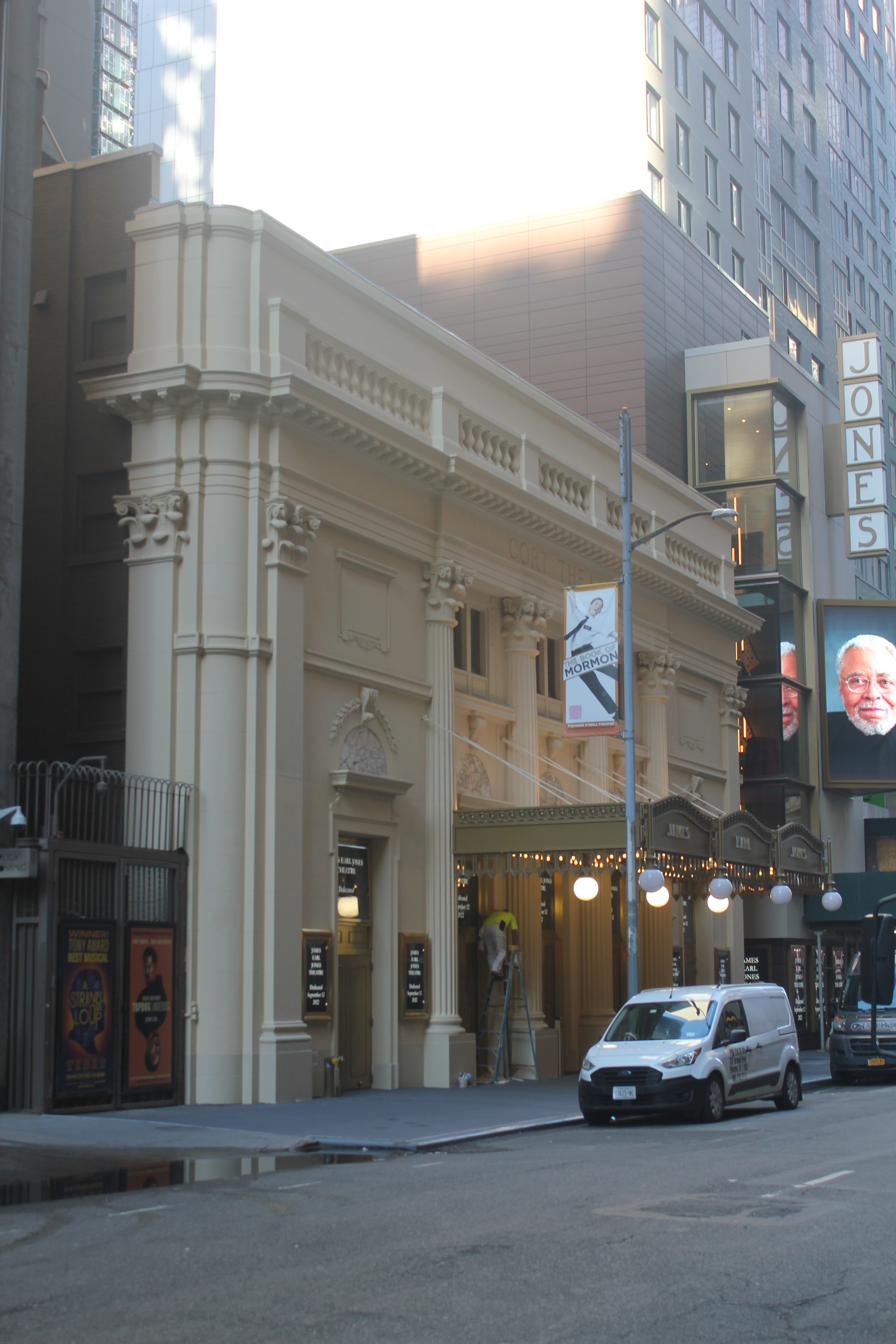
Viewed from the east

CBS leased the theater as a television studio for The Merv Griffin Show, which started broadcasting from there in August 1969. The network spent $1 million on renovating the theater to convert it to a television studio. By late 1970, Merv Griffin had moved his show to California. Griffin said he had been "ashamed" of leaving the Cort, since CBS had renovated it exclusively for his show, but the ratings for The Merv Griffin Show had increased following its relocation to California. Meanwhile, CBS continued to lease the theater at a high price. Two years into CBS's lease, the construction of the neighboring 1211 Avenue of the Americas caused structural damage to the theater's interior, and two girders were placed on the eastern wall. Because the interior was no longer suitable for television productions, CBS decided to let the lease lapse. The CBS lease from 1969 to 1972 was the only period in which the Cort was used as a television studio rather than as a theater.

The theater hosted the short-lived All the Girls Came Out to Play in 1972 and Jockey Club Stakes in 1973. The Magic Show opened in 1974 and played 1,920 performances over the next five years. The last production of that decade was King Richard III, which opened in 1979 and ran only 33 performances. In 1980, the Cort hosted the flop Clothes for a Summer Hotel, as well as the more successful Home the same year, with over 200 performances. The Cort then hosted Rose in 1981; Medea and Twice Around the Park in 1982; and A Moon for the Misbegotten and Ma Rainey's Black Bottom in 1984. Theatrical historian Ken Bloom, observing several of the Cort's short performances, said: "The Cort's luck seems to have run out." The 1980s ended with the South African play Sarafina!, which played for over a year. During the 1980s, the Shuberts renovated the Cort as part of a restoration program for their Broadway theaters.

The New York City Landmarks Preservation Commission (LPC) had started considering protecting the Cort as an official city landmark in 1982, with discussions continuing over the next several years. The LPC designated both the facade and the interior as landmarks on November 17, 1987. This was part of the LPC's wide-ranging effort in 1987 to grant landmark status to Broadway theaters. The New York City Board of Estimate ratified the designations in March 1988. The Shuberts, the Nederlanders, and Jujamcyn collectively sued the LPC in June 1988 to overturn the landmark designations of 22 theaters, including the Cort, on the merit that the designations severely limited the extent to which the theaters could be modified. The lawsuit was escalated to the New York Supreme Court and the Supreme Court of the United States, but these designations were ultimately upheld in 1992.

The Cort hosted the hit The Grapes of Wrath in 1990, as well as Lincoln Center Theater's short-lived production of Two Shakespearean Actors in 1992. This was followed in 1994 by Twilight: Los Angeles, 1992. Lincoln Center Theater returned to the Cort in 1995 with its revival of The Heiress, which ran for over 300 performances. Lincoln Center Theater then booked two additional productions: Sex and Longing in 1996 and An American Daughter in 1997. At the end of the decade, productions at the Cort included Freak (1998), The Blue Room (1998), and Kat and the Kings (1999).

==== 2000s and 2010s ====
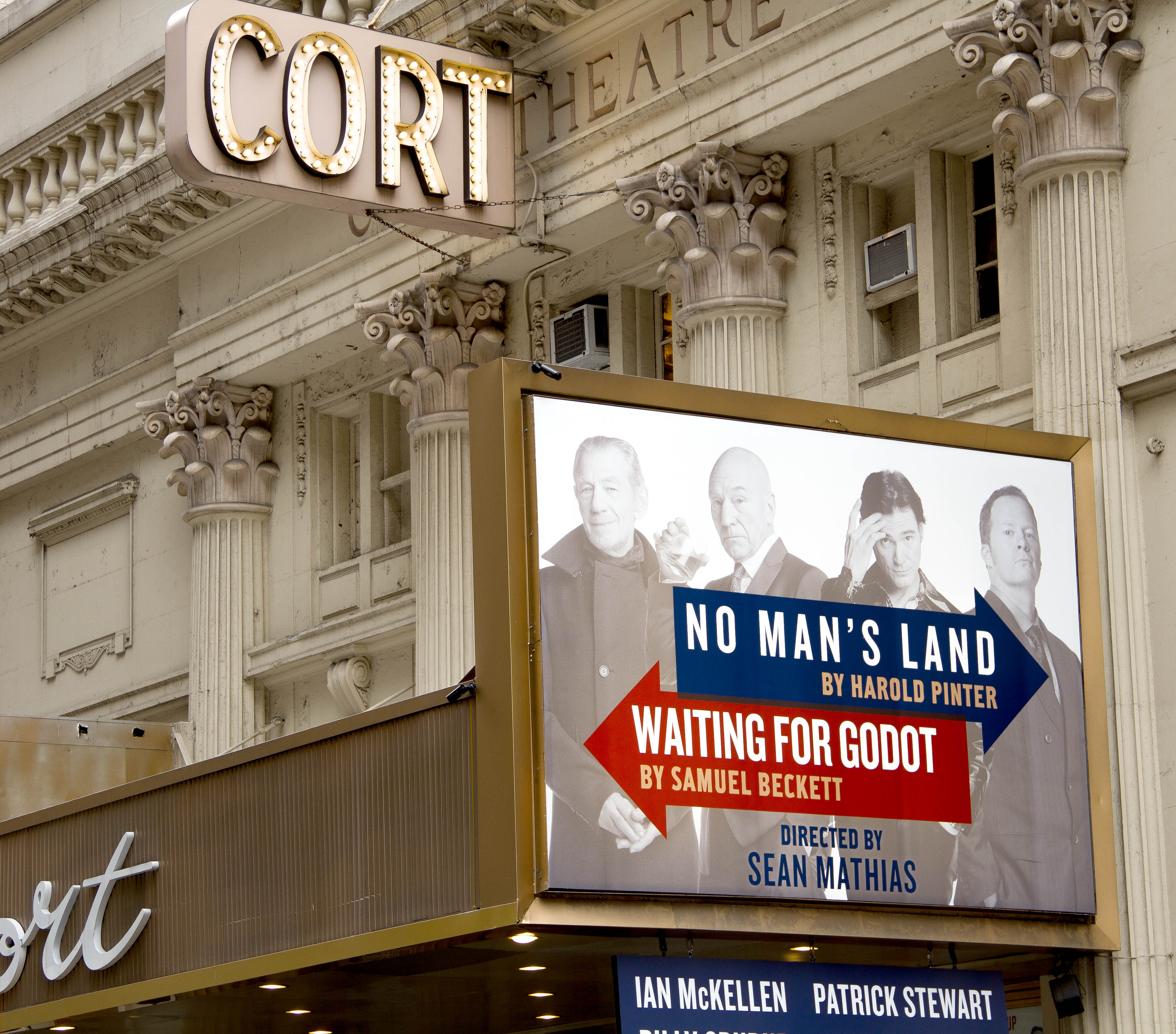
No Man's Land and Waiting for Godot

In 2000, the Cort hosted a short production of The Green Bird. It then hosted Hollywood Arms in 2002, A Year with Frog and Toad in 2003, and Laugh Whore in 2004. As part of a settlement with the United States Department of Justice in 2003, the Shuberts agreed to improve disabled access at their 16 landmarked Broadway theaters, including the Cort. The theater's other productions in the decade included On Golden Pond (2005), Barefoot in the Park and The Little Dog Laughed (2006), Radio Golf and The Homecoming (2007), The 39 Steps (2008), and You're Welcome America: A Final Night with George W. Bush (2009).

Early in the 2010s, the theater hosted Fences and Time Stands Still in 2010; Born Yesterday and Stick Fly in 2011; and The Lyons and Grace in 2012. Fences set the box office record for the theater, grossing $1,175,626 over eight performances for the week ending July 11, 2010. The Cort hosted Breakfast at Tiffany's in 2013, and No Man's Land and Waiting for Godot played in repertory the same year. Subsequently, The Cripple of Inishmaan and This is Our Youth played at the Cort in 2014, while Fish in the Dark and Sylvia played in 2015. The Shuberts acquired an adjacent garage to the west and demolished it in 2016. The Cort then hosted the production of Bright Star that year. In 2017, the Shuberts received permission from the LPC to construct a 35-foot-wide annex west of the existing theater, designed by Kostow Greenwood Architects. Francesca Russo would also design a renovation of the existing theater. The Shuberts also received permission to transfer 119,268 square feet (11,080.4 m^{2}) of air development rights to a 49-story hotel adjoining the theater; the air rights sale was valued at $50 million. The Cort additionally showed two productions in 2017: Indecent and M. Butterfly. Mike Birbiglia performed his one-man comedy The New One in 2018, and the productions of King Lear and Derren Brown's one-man show Secret were housed at the Cort in 2019.

==== 2020s to present ====
The theater closed on March 12, 2020, due to the COVID-19 pandemic. During the shutdown, in March 2021, the Shuberts announced that the Cort would be refurbished and the annex would be built. JRM Construction was hired as the general contractor for the project. The Minutes, which had only played previews at the Cort before the shutdown, relocated as a result of the renovation. During the COVID-19 shutdown, the Shuberts, Nederlanders, and Jujamcyn had pledged to increase racial and cultural diversity in their theaters, including naming at least one theater for a Black theatrical personality. Accordingly, in March 2022, the Shuberts announced that the Cort would be renamed after actor James Earl Jones and would be rededicated upon its reopening in mid-2022. The Jones was the second Broadway theater to be named after a Black theatrical personality. (Note: Jujamcyn renamed the August Wilson Theatre for playwright August Wilson in 2005, while the Nederlanders announced that they would rename the Brooks Atkinson Theatre for singer and actress Lena Horne later in 2022.)

In August 2022, it was announced that the Jones would reopen that November with previews of the play Ohio State Murders. The James Earl Jones Theatre's marquee was revealed on September 12, 2022, celebrating the completion of the theater's $47 million renovation and expansion. Ohio State Murders officially opened in December 2022 as the renamed theater's first show, running for one month. This was scheduled to be followed in April 2023 by Room, which was postponed indefinitely during rehearsals. Instead, The Sign in Sidney Brustein's Window opened at the theater that April. It was followed by a limited run of Gutenberg! The Musical! in October 2023, then by the original run of the musical The Heart of Rock and Roll in April 2024 and the play Left on Tenth in October 2024. The musical Real Women Have Curves opened at the Jones in April 2025 and was followed that October by a transfer of the Off-Broadway play Liberation. A stage adaptation of the documentary The Fear of 13 opened at the Jones in April 2026. During the run of The Fear of 13, in June 2026, a bust of James Earl Jones was installed in the lobby. Wanted: The Legend of the Sisters Clarke made its Broadway premiere at the theater in November 2026.

== Notable productions ==
Productions are listed by the year of their first performance. This list only includes Broadway shows; it does not include films screened at the theater, nor does it include shows that were taped there.

Notable productions at the theater
Opening year	Name	Refs.
1915	The Princess Pat	
1918	Everyman	
1918	The Merchant of Venice	
1918	As You Like It	
1918	Julius Caesar	
1918	The Better 'Ole	
1919	Abraham Lincoln	
1921	Captain Applejack	
1922	Merton of the Movies	
1924	The Assumption of Hannele	
1924	The Second Mrs. Tanqueray	
1925	The Jazz Singer	
1928	The Wrecker	
1930	Uncle Vanya	
1930	Five Star Final	
1932	The Blue Bird	
1933	The Green Bay Tree	
1935	The Bishop Misbehaves	
1935	Most of the Game	
1935	There's Wisdom in Women	
1937	Room Service	
1939	The White Steed	
1940	The Male Animal	
1940	Charley's Aunt	
1942	Cafe Crown	
1942	I Killed the Count	
1946	The Winter's Tale	
1946	Antigone	
1946	Candida	
1946	Lady Windermere's Fan	
1948	Ghosts	
1948	Hedda Gabler	
1948	The Happy Journey to Trenton and Camden and The Respectful Prostitute	(Note: The Happy Journey to Trenton and Camden and The Respectful Prostitute were performed in repertory.)
1948	Make Way for Lucia	
1949	Two Blind Mice	
1949	The Father	
1950	As You Like It	
1951	Saint Joan	
1952	The Shrike	
1954	The Rainmaker	
1955	The Diary of Anne Frank	
1958	Sunrise at Campobello	
1960	Once Upon a Mattress	
1960	The Hostage	
1960	Advise and Consent	
1961	Purlie Victorious	
1961	Sunday in New York	
1962	The Father, Long Day's Journey into Night, and Miss Julie	(Note: The Father, Long Day's Journey into Night, and Miss Julie were performed in repertory.)
1963	One Flew Over the Cuckoo's Nest	
1965	Boeing-Boeing	
1965	The Zulu and the Zayda	
1967	Johnny No-Trump	
1967	Something Different	
1968	Leda Had a Little Swan	(Note: Leda Had a Little Swan never officially opened at the Cort Theatre; it only played previews.)
1969	Red, White and Maddox	
1974	The Magic Show	
1979	King Richard III	
1980	Clothes for a Summer Hotel	
1982	Medea	
1984	A Moon for the Misbegotten	
1984	Ma Rainey's Black Bottom	
1988	Sarafina!	
1990	The Grapes of Wrath	
1993	Face Value	(Note: Face Value never officially opened at the Cort Theatre; it only played previews.)
1994	Twilight: Los Angeles, 1992	
1995	The Heiress	
1997	An American Daughter	
1998	Freak	
1998	The Blue Room	
1999	Kat and the Kings	
2000	The Green Bird	
2002	Hollywood Arms	
2003	A Year with Frog and Toad	
2003	Bobbi Boland	(Note: Bobbi Boland never officially opened at the Cort Theatre; it only played previews.)
2004	Laugh Whore	
2005	On Golden Pond	
2006	Barefoot in the Park	
2006	The Little Dog Laughed	
2007	Radio Golf	
2007	The Homecoming	
2008	The 39 Steps	
2009	You're Welcome America: A Final Night with George W. Bush	
2010	A View from the Bridge	
2010	Fences	
2010	Time Stands Still	
2011	Born Yesterday	
2011	Stick Fly	
2012	The Lyons	
2012	Grace	
2013	Breakfast at Tiffany's	
2013	No Man's Land and Waiting for Godot	(Note: No Man's Land and Waiting for Godot were performed in repertory.)
2014	The Cripple of Inishmaan	
2014	This is Our Youth	
2015	Fish in the Dark	
2015	Sylvia	
2016	Bright Star	
2017	Indecent	
2017	M. Butterfly	
2018	Mike Birbiglia's The New One	
2019	King Lear	
2019	Derren Brown: Secret	
2020	The Minutes	(Note: Due to the COVID-19 pandemic, The Minutes never officially opened at the Cort Theatre; it only played previews.)
2022	Ohio State Murders	
2023	The Sign in Sidney Brustein's Window	
2023	Gutenberg! The Musical!	
2024	The Heart of Rock and Roll	
2024	Left on Tenth	
2025	Real Women Have Curves	
2025	Liberation	
2026	The Fear of 13	
2026	Wanted: The Legend of the Sisters Clarke	

== See also ==
- List of New York City Designated Landmarks in Manhattan from 14th to 59th Streets
- List of Broadway theaters
