= Two Blind Mice =

1949 play

Two Blind Mice was a 1949 comedy play by Samuel and Bella Spewack. The play ran on Broadway at the Cort Theatre for 157 performances, from March 2, 1949 to July 16, 1949, and thereafter had a lengthy provincial tour. The play starred Melvyn Douglas as Tommy Thurston, newspaper reporter and was produced by Archer King and Harrison Woodhull. The play was selected as one of the best plays of 1948-1949, with an excerpted version published in "The Burns Mantle Best Plays of 1948-1949."

== Plot ==
The plot revolves around the Office of Medicinal Herbs, a fictitious U.S. government bureau abolished by Congress four years before the setting of the play. Its two elderly officials have refused to accept the closing – they feel it is their lives' work – and they keep it running quietly. Deprived of funding, they make ends meet by renting out rooms and running a parking lot on the front lawn. To avoid problems with what remains of the government, they never answer the phone.

Thurston discovers the office and sets out to aid the workers. Through an elaborate series of practical jokes, he involves the Armed Forces and the State Department, eventually winning the day for the elderly ladies. In the process, he also wins back his former wife.

== Production ==
The opening night, March 2, 1949, saw the audience enjoy the production. However, Brooks Atkinson, the critic for The New York Times, gave it a lukewarm review, and later in March criticized the Spewacks for wasting an intriguing setup by turning it over to Thurston, whom Atkinson dubbed "an adolescent journalistic prankster who has nothing to give anybody except impudence, irresponsibility and show clichés". The play closed July 16, 1949, and its two mascots, white mice, were put up for adoption. In his autobiography, Douglas laid the blame for the play's failure to run more than four and a half months on Broadway on Samuel Spewack's insistence on not only writing, but also directing the play.

The show began a tour throughout the eastern half of the United States and into Canada in early 1950, after adjustments in the show insisted upon by Douglas were made, and ran throughout the year. The show kept Douglas away from California during his wife Helen Gahagan Douglas's run for United States Senate against Richard Nixon, a campaign which proved extremely nasty.
