= The Bishop Misbehaves (film) =

1935 film by Ewald André Dupont

- Directed by: E. A. Dupont
- Written by: Leon Gordon; Monckton Hoffe; George Auerbach
- Based on: The Bishop Misbehaves; 1935 play by Frederick J. Jackson
- Produced by: Lawrence Weingarten
- Starring: Edmund Gwenn; Maureen O'Sullivan; Lucile Watson; Reginald Owen
- Cinematography: James Van Trees
- Edited by: James E. Newcom
- Music by: Edward Ward
- Production company: Metro-Goldwyn-Mayer
- Distributed by: Metro-Goldwyn-Mayer
- Release date: September 13, 1935
- Running time: 85 minutes
- Country: United States
- Language: English

The Bishop Misbehaves is a 1935 American comedy crime film directed by E. A. Dupont and starring Edmund Gwenn, Maureen O'Sullivan and Lucile Watson. It was based on the 1934 play of the same title by Frederick J. Jackson. Dupont made the film after signing a one-film contract with Metro-Goldwyn-Mayer, having made his first American sound film the year before with Universal Pictures. It is also known by the alternative title The Bishop's Misadventures.

== Plot ==
American photographer Donald Meadows is touring Britain to take photos of cathedrals. He sees Hester Grantham attending services at a cathedral and flirts with her. She isn’t interested until she talks to him and finds that he is an American from Chicago. She figures a man from Chicago knows about crime. She asks if he has a gun. He says yes. She tells him she needs his help in committing a robbery. Thinking she is joking, he gets roped into her scheme to retrieve documents that prove that Guy Waller stole documents from her father. The documents prove that her father should have been awarded a patent that Waller claimed and made a fortune from.

With the help of a local pub owner, and some criminals from Limehouse, Waller’s car is sabotaged near the pub. Daniel, disguised as a highwayman, pulls a gun on Waller and his wife. They are tied up and locked in a closet with the pub owner. Jewels stolen from Mrs. Waller are left in a container on the shelf of the pub. Daniel takes Waller’s wallet which contain the documents.

The Bishop of Broadminster and his sister are out on an adventure and go to the pub. They find the three people tied up and hear their story. The Bishop, a fan of detective fiction, is thrilled with the situation and decides to solve the crime.

The criminals manage to get the jewels and the wallet. The Bishop, Donald and Hester all end up at Limehouse. Donald and Hester are abducted by the criminals but they talk them into blackmailing Waller for the document and splitting the money. Waller shows up with his wife.

The Bishop tries to get help from the police but they don’t believe his story. He is able is to get a crowd from the local pub to break in and rescue Donald and Hester. In the ensuing melee, Waller is able to grab the documents and throw them in the fire.

The Bishop regrets his interference and apologizes to Donald and Hester. He is so ashamed of what has happened as a result of his thirst for adventure that he vows to confess all to his congregation. Waller’s wife, already feeling like a social outcast due to her humble background, tells Waller he better pay the 10,000 pounds or she’ll leave him. Waller gives Hester the money. The Bishop vows to give up reading mysteries.

== Cast ==
- Edmund Gwenn as Bishop
- Maureen O'Sullivan as Hester
- Lucile Watson as Lady Emily
- Reginald Owen as Guy Waller
- Dudley Digges as 'Red'
- Norman Foster as Donald
- Lilian Bond as Mrs. Waller
- Melville Cooper as Collins
- Robert Greig as Rosalind
- Charles McNaughton as 'Frenchy'
- Etienne Girardot as Brooke
- Ivan F. Simpson as Mr. Grantham
- Lumsden Hare as Constable

== Reception ==
Modern Screen gave the film a three-star review and described it as "a lively and pleasant affair, worth your attention." In discussing the performances, it said "both Edmund Gwenn and Lucile Watson, as the bishop and the sister, are excellent, and an engaging bit is performed by Lilian Bond, who oughta be in more pictures."

== Radio adaptation ==
The Bishop Misbehaves was presented on Theatre Guild on the Air May 25, 1952. The one-hour adaptation starred Charles Laughton, Vanessa Brown, Josephine Hull, and Michael Evans.

== Bibliography ==
- Glancy, H. Mark. When Hollywood Loved Britain: The Hollywood 'British' Film 1939-1945. Manchester University Press, 1999.
