= T. J. Turner (linebacker) =

American football player (1978–2014)

No. 99
- Position: Linebacker

Personal information
- Born: October 1, 1978; Dayton, Ohio, U.S.
- Died: March 10, 2014 (aged 35); Dayton, Ohio, U.S.
- Listed height: 6 ft 3 in (1.91 m)
- Listed weight: 255 lb (116 kg)

Career information
- High school: Hillsboro (Hillsboro, Ohio)
- College: Michigan State (1997–2000)
- NFL draft: 2001: 7th round, 239th overall pick

Career history
- New England Patriots (2001); San Francisco 49ers (2002)*
- * Offseason or practice squad member only
- Stats at Pro Football Reference

Thomas Samuel Turner III (October 1, 1978 – March 10, 2014) was an American professional football linebacker who played one season with the New England Patriots of the National Football League (NFL). He was selected by the Patriots in the seventh round of the 2001 NFL draft after playing college football at Michigan State University.

== Early life and college ==
Thomas Samuel Turner III was born on October 1, 1978, in Dayton, Ohio. He played high school football at Hillsboro High School in Hillsboro, Ohio. He recorded 103 tackles, including seven sacks, three interceptions and six fumbles recoveries his senior year in 1996, earning Super-Prep All-American honors. Turner was a two-way player in high school, also playing tight end. He caught 39 passes for 757 yards and 14 touchdowns as a senior. The football team had a 37–3 regular season record during Turner's four years of high school. He also played basketball in high school, averaging 18 points and 10 rebounds per game.

Turner was a four-year letterman for the Michigan State Spartans of Michigan State University from 1997 to 2000. He totaled 66 tackles and two sacks his junior season in 1999, garnering honorable mention All-Big Ten Conference recognition.

== Professional career ==
Turner was selected by the New England Patriots in the seventh round, with the 239th overall pick, of the 2001 NFL draft. He officially signed with the team on July 5. He played in two games for the Patriots during the 2001 season, posting one solo tackle and two assisted tackles, before being released on November 10, 2001.

Turner signed with the San Francisco 49ers on May 29, 2002. He was released on June 12, 2002.

== Personal life ==
Turner died of cancer on March 10, 2014, in Dayton.
