= Kirsten Greenidge =

American playwright

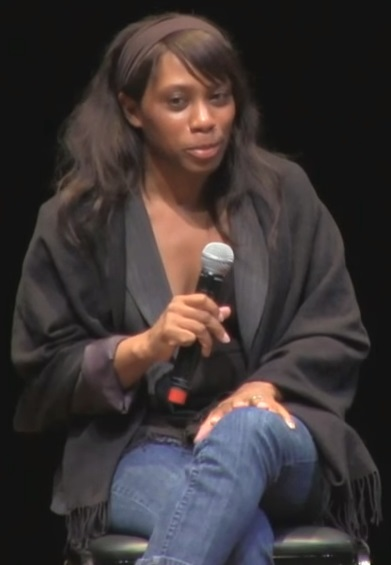
- Education: Wesleyan University (BA); University of Iowa (MFA)

Kirsten Greenidge is an American playwright. Her plays are known for their realistic language and focus on social issues such as the intersectionality of race, gender, and class. Her sisters are the historian Kerri Greenidge and writer Kaitlyn Greenidge.

== Career ==
Greenidge has said that she decided she wanted to be a playwright after seeing August Wilson's Joe Turner's Come and Gone at age 12. She attended Wesleyan University and the University of Iowa's Playwright Workshop. From 2007 to 2009, she was part of the Huntington Theatre Company's Playwriting Fellows cohort. From 2006 to 2013, Greenidge was a Resident Playwright at New Dramatists in New York City She is currently associate professor at Boston University, teaching playwriting and mentoring undergraduate students. In 2016, Greenidge began a three-year term as the Playwright in Residence at Boston's Company One Theatre through the National Playwright Residency Program, funded by the Andrew W. Mellon Foundation and administered by HowlRound. In 2024, Greenidge has been named director of the School of Theater in the College of Fine Arts at Boston University.

== Notable works ==
=== Milk Like Sugar ===
Milk Like Sugar is a coming of age play about 16 year old Annie who makes a pregnancy pact with her friends. As she dreams about having a baby and leading a happy life, she soon learns teen pregnancy is not all it's made to be in her head. The play opened Off-Broadway at Playwrights Horizons Peter Jay Sharp Theatre on October 13, 2011 (previews) and closed on November 27, 2011. It was directed by Rebecca Taichman and starred Tonya Pinkins. The play won a 2012 Obie Awards, Playwriting and Performance, Cherise Boothe and the 2012 Lucille Lortel Award, Outstanding Featured Actress, Tonya Pinkins. Greenidge was partially inspired by news stories in the summer of 2008 about the so-called "pregnancy pact" at Gloucester High School, Massachusetts. Milk Like Sugar was an attempt by Greenidge to challenge the traditional female Black characters and create diverse Black experiences based on stories that have never been told on stage. The La Jolla Playhouse received the 2011 Round One Edgerton Foundation New Play Awards for Milk Like Sugar.

=== Luck of the Irish ===
Luck of the Irish is about an African American family, whose house was bought by an Irish couple in the 1950s and how to the family's dismay the deed may have never been properly transferred. The family must now find the deed, convince the couple not to take the house, or risk eviction. The play had its world premiere directed by Melia Bensussen at the Huntington Theatre Company in March 2012. The play was produced Off Broadway at the Lincoln Center Claire Tow Theater from February 2013 to March 10, 2013.

=== Baltimore ===
Greenidge was commissioned the Big Ten Theatre Consortium to write this play in the spring of 2014. After a racial epithet was written on a student's door the entire campus is in social debate about the racial issues taking place in a very contemporary college setting. Issues such as microaggressions, racial color blindness and social segregation are talked about in the play by an ethnically diverse cast. Baltimore was workshopped at the University of Maryland, and then produced in February 2016 at Boston University, in a co-production with New Repertory Theatre and the Boston Center for American Performance.

=== Greater Good (2019) ===
Greater Good was produced by Boston’s Company One Theatre in collaboration with American Repertory Theater and the A.R.T. Breakout Series, July 17-Aug 17, 2019. The play is staged within a Montessori-inspired private school at the Commonwealth School in Boston, representing systemic flaws such as underpaid teachers, tokenization, and privatization.^{5} The audience navigates the school building, engaging in scenes of conflict and interacting with artifacts and characters, blending site-specific and forensic storytelling. Its structure mirrors Sleep No More and Fefu and Her Friends by splitting the audience into groups that experience scenes in different sequences and styles, ranging from naturalistic to absurdist.

== Critical reception ==
The New York Times said Luck of the Irish "feels overburdened and overwritten," whereas the Chicago Tribune praised it as "riveting and provocative."

In “Teenage Motherhood Is Serious, Especially With Baby Bling at Play” in the New York Times, Charles Isherwood critiques Milk Like Sugar's rich, vernacular dialogue and sharply defined characters, which create humor and authenticity. However, the pact premise is criticized as implausible and overly schematic, with some scenes slipping into predictable, didactic storytelling.
