= D. L. Coburn =

American dramatist (1938–2025)

Donald Lee Coburn (August 4, 1938 – December 3, 2025) was an American dramatist. He won the Pulitzer Prize for Drama in 1978 for his play The Gin Game.

== Life and career ==
Coburn was born in Baltimore, Maryland, on August 4, 1938, to parents who divorced two years later. He graduated from high school in 1957, then served in the U.S. Navy from 1958 to 1960. Coburn had been married twice, first to Nazle Joyce French, whom he married in 1964 and divorced in 1971, then to Marsha Woodruff Maher in 1975. He had his own advertising company from 1965 to 1968. He then worked for the Stanford Advertising Agency in Dallas, Texas, from 1968 to 1971. Coburn worked as a marketing consultant from 1973 to 1976.

=== Playwriting career ===
Coburn's first play, The Gin Game, was first staged in Los Angeles by American Theater Arts in 1976, leading to a subsequent production in Louisville, Kentucky, and a run of 517 performances on Broadway and later performances around the world. The play won the 1978 Pulitzer prize for drama. It was published by Samuel French in 1977 and by Drama Book Specialists in 1978. A sound recording on cassette (LCCN 98-701546) was issued by L.A. Theatre Works in 1996.

Coburn's later plays were less successful. None were published. Bluewater Cottage (1979) was staged by American Theater Arts but was never performed elsewhere. Return to Bluefin (2009) was produced as a one-act play Off-Broadway, but Coburn could not find a theater to stage it after he expanded it to a multi-act work. A later drama, House of Clay, had a reading in Dallas but was never staged. Other unpublished plays include Guy (1983), Noble Adjustment (1985), Fear of Darkness (1995), Firebrand (1997), and The Cause (1998). Coburn also wrote television series pilots, and screenplays including Flights of Angels (1987), A Virgin Year (1991), and Legal Access (1994).

=== Death ===
Coburn died from colon cancer on December 3, 2025, in Dallas, Texas, at the age of 87.

== Sources ==
- Contemporary Authors Online, Gale, 2008. Reproduced in Biography Resource Center. Farmington Hills, Mich.: Gale, 2008. Galenet. Document Number: H1000019020. Online. May 30, 2008.
