= Archer King =

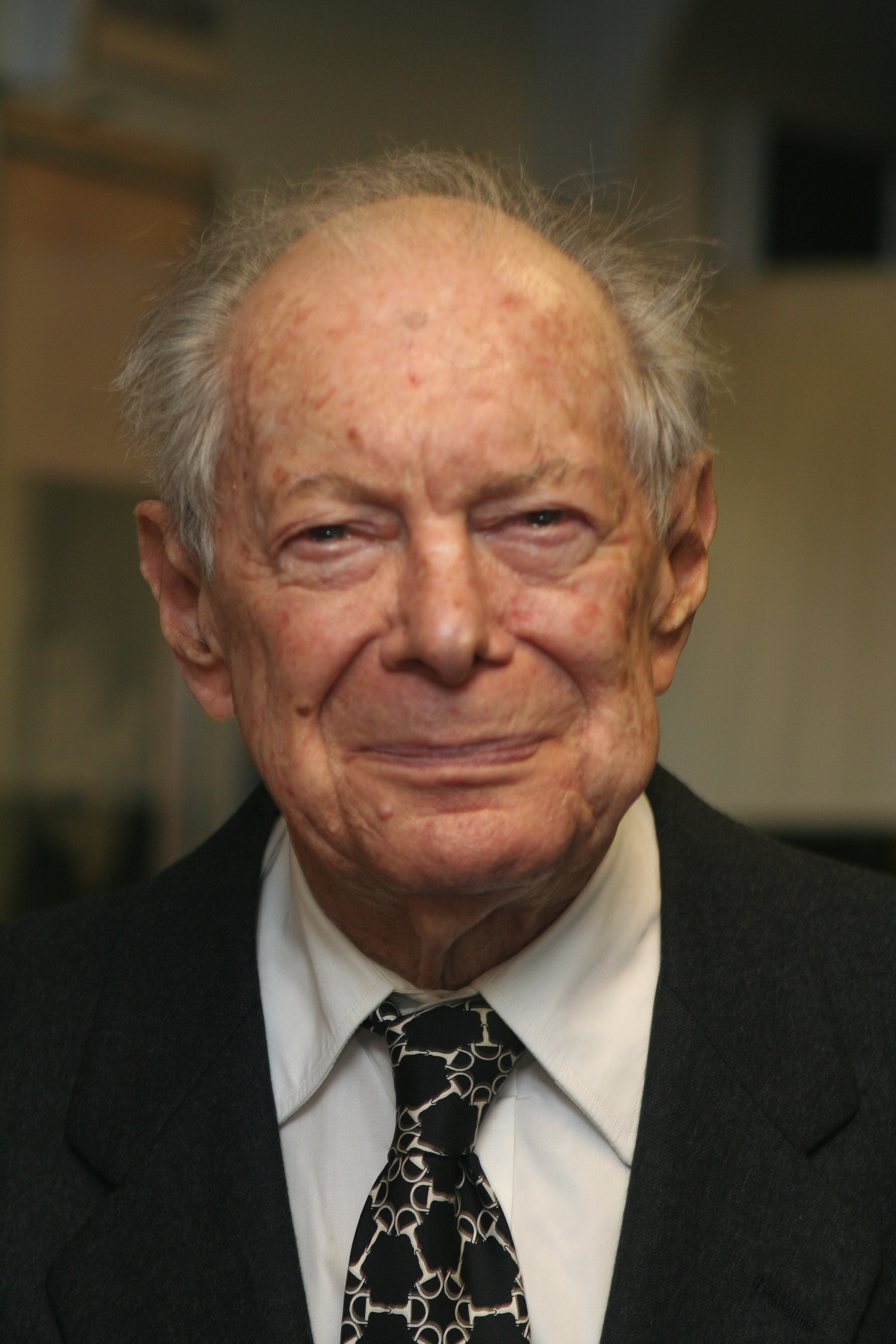
Archer King

Archer King (February 27, 1917, New York City, New York – July 19, 2012, New York City) was an American theatrical agent, producer and actor.

King acted in the Broadway productions Summer Night and Stop Press in 1939. These were followed by service in World War II. After the war, he returned to the theatre and produced a number of Broadway plays, including Two Blind Mice by Sam Spewack and Miracle in the Mountains by Ferenc Molnár. In 1951, he was hired as head of talent at CBS. In 1952, he became an agent with the Louis Shurr Agency.

King started his own agency in 1957. He is credited with discovering James Dean, Jason Robards, Jack Warden, Martin Sheen, Paul Mazursky, Elizabeth Montgomery, Tommy Tune and Ron Howard. He has represented clients such as John Cassavetes, Broderick Crawford, Bette Midler, Dorothy Malone, Alexis Smith and Tommy Tune.

In 1963, Archer King Ltd, under Kanawha Films Ltd., acquired and distributed a number of foreign films, including Roman Polanski's Knife in the Water and Volker Schlondorff's Young Torless. Both films were nominated for Academy Awards.

From 1979 to 1986, while retaining his agents' franchise, he became the head of production of the Theater-to-Television' Division of RKO Pictures. There he acquired and produced Sweeney Todd starring Angela Lansbury, which won an Ace Award for Best Production, The Gin Game, starring Hume Cronyn and Jessica Tandy, I Do! I Do! starring Lee Remick and Hal Linden, and Lena Horne's one-woman show Lena Horne: The Lady and Her Music.
