= The Gin Game =

1976 play by American playwright Donald L. Coburn

- Playbill cover from 1977 Broadway production
- Original language: English
- Written by: Donald L. Coburn
- Characters: Weller Martin; Fonsia Dorsey
- Genre: Tragicomedy

Premiere
- Date: September 24, 1976
- Place: American Theater Arts; Hollywood, California
- Official website

The Gin Game is a two-person, two-act play by Donald L. Coburn that premiered at American Theater Arts in Hollywood in September 1976, directed by Kip Niven. It was Coburn's first play, and the theater's first production. The play won the 1978 Pulitzer Prize for Drama.

== Plot ==
Weller Martin and Fonsia Dorsey, two elderly residents at a nursing home for senior citizens, strike up an acquaintance. Neither seems to have any other friends, and they start to enjoy each other's company. Weller offers to teach Fonsia how to play gin rummy, and they begin playing a series of games that Fonsia always wins. Weller's inability to win a single hand becomes increasingly frustrating to him, while Fonsia becomes increasingly confident.

While playing their games of gin, they engage in lengthy conversations about their families and their lives in the outside world. Gradually, each conversation becomes a battle, much like the ongoing gin games, as each player tries to expose the other's weaknesses, to belittle the other's life, and to humiliate the other thoroughly.

== Production history ==
The play premiered in a production by American Theatre Arts in Los Angeles, California in September 1976, directed by Kip Niven and with actors, Carol Locatell and John Terry Bell creating the roles of Fonsia and Weller. The play went on to be presented at the Actors Theatre of Louisville festival of new plays, the Long Wharf Theatre (New Haven) in July 1977, and the Wilbur Theatre, Boston.

The Gin Game opened on Broadway on October 6, 1977 at the John Golden Theatre and closed on December 31, 1978 after 517 performances. The play was directed by Mike Nichols and starred the married couple Hume Cronyn and Jessica Tandy. The play has come to be closely associated with them. Cronyn and Tandy were succeeded in the original Broadway run by E. G. Marshall and Maureen Stapleton.

Cronyn and Tandy revived their roles in London at the Lyric Theatre in 1979. It was revived in London in 1999 with Joss Ackland and Dorothy Tutin at the Savoy Theatre, directed by Frith Banbury.

Romanian director Liviu Ciulei directed the Romanian premiere at the Bulandra Theatre in 1980.

It was revived on Broadway at the Lyceum Theatre from April 20, 1997 to August 31, 1997, for 145 performances. Charles Durning and Julie Harris co-starred, directed by Charles Nelson Reilly. It received several Tony Award nominations, including for Best Revival of a Play. This production had a seven-month tour, starting in Durham, North Carolina in October 1998. The tour played an engement at the Wilshire Theater, Los Angeles, California, in December 1998. The Variety reviewer wrote: "Some of the actors' movements in the early going could be smoother and less artificial, and the climactic moments of the final scene are more baffling than illuminating, but overall, Charles Nelson Reilly's direction reflects a keen sensitivity to the play's finer, unspoken points. Durning and Harris are delightful as the sparring duo. Their masterful work makes this "Gin Game" a sure bet."

The play was revived on Broadway in a limited run, at the John Golden Theatre, on September 23, 2015 in previews, officially on October 14, 2015. It closed on January 10, 2016. It starred James Earl Jones and Cicely Tyson, with direction by Leonard Foglia.

== Adaptations ==
Adaptations for television versions were made in 1981 produced by Archer King with Cronyn and Tandy for Showtime. Dick Van Dyke and Mary Tyler Moore appeared in a televised film on PBS in May 2003.

== Casts of major productions ==
Characters	LA Production (1976)	Broadway (1977)	Broadway Replacements (1977)	Broadway Revival (1997)	Television Production (2003)	Second Broadway Revival (2015)
Weller Martin	John Terry Bell	Hume Cronyn	E.G. Marshall	Charles Durning	Dick Van Dyke	James Earl Jones
Fonsia Dorsey	Carol Locatell	Jessica Tandy	Maureen Stapleton	Julie Harris	Mary Tyler Moore	Cicely Tyson

== Awards and nominations ==
The Gin Game won the Pulitzer Prize for Drama for 1978. The Pulitzer jury, in awarding the prize, said: "The one new play...of sufficient originality, invention and staying power was 'The Gin Game'".

Awards

- 1978 Pulitzer Prize for Drama
- 1978 Tony Award, Best Actress in a Play (Jessica Tandy)

Nominations

- 1978 Drama Desk Award Outstanding New Play
- 1978 Tony Award for Best Play
- 1978 Tony Award, Actor in a Play (Hume Cronyn)
- 1978 Tony Award for Best Direction of a Play
- 1997 Drama Desk Award Outstanding Revival of a Play
- 1997 Tony Award for Best Revival of a Play
- 1997 Tony Award, Actress in a Play (Julie Harris)
- 1997 Tony Award, Direction of a Play

== In popular culture ==
- In the second episode of the eighth season (2005) of the CBS sitcom The King of Queens, Arthur (Jerry Stiller) is directing The Gin Game at the local senior center and has trouble casting Fonsia.
