= Stick Fly =

2006 play written by Lydia R. Diamond

- Written by: Lydia R. Diamond
- Characters: Kimber; Spoon; Flip; Cheryl; Joe; Taylor
- Original language: English
- Subject: Race, class
- Genre: Domestic Drama
- Setting: Martha's Vineyard, Massachusetts, 2005

Premiere
- Date premiered: March 2006
- Place premiered: Congo Square Theatre Company, Chicago

Stick Fly is a 2006 play written by Lydia R. Diamond.

== Synopsis ==
The show takes place at the LeVay Home, in Edgartown, as it is a point of contention where the family resides. The family was the first black family on the island, and the show deals with race, class, and gender politics.

== Productions ==
The play was premiered in March 2006 by the Congo Square Theatre Company in Chicago, directed by Chuck Smith. It was performed from March 26 to June 14, 2009 by The Matrix Theatre Company in Los Angeles, and from February 19 to March 21, 2010, by the Huntington Theatre Company at the Boston Centre for the Arts, directed by Kenny Leon.

This production transferred to Broadway at the Cort Theatre on December 8, 2011, directed by Kenny Leon, assistant director Kamilah Forbes, set design David Gallo, costume design Reggie Ray, lighting design Beverly Emmons, sound design Peter Fitzgerald, hair design Gregory Bazemore, and incidental music by Alicia Keys. The cast included Rosie Benton (Kimber), Dulé Hill (Spoon "Kent" LeVay), Mekhi Phifer (Flip "Harold" LeVay), Condola Rashad (Cheryl), Ruben Santiago-Hudson (Joe LeVay), and Tracie Thoms (Taylor). Understudies included Jerome Preston Bates (Joe), Don Guillory (Spoon/Flip), Gretchen Hall (Kimber), and Zakiya Young (Cheryl, Taylor).

It was subsequently performed from October 24 to December 22, 2013, by Arden Theatre Company (Philadelphia), directed by Walter Dallas, across June and July 2015 at Windy City Playhouse, Chicago, directed by Chuck Smith (again), and from February 5 to March 15, 2020, at Writers Theatre, Glencoe, Illinois, directed by Ron OJ Parson. It was streamed online as a live reading from the actors' homes on August 1, 2020, by Stars in the House, directed by Dell Howlett.

== Reviews of Broadway production ==
Charles Isherwood of The New York Times wrote "this overstuffed but lively comedy-drama...also signifies a departure for Broadway in its depiction of generational conflict and sexual sparks among a well-to-do contemporary African-American family and friends. Pointed discussions of race and class erupt as often as testy personality clashes...The discovery of the evening is the quietly captivating Ms. Rashad". Terry Teachout for The Wall Street Journal said "One of the most exciting things that a playwright can do is to show you an unfamiliar way of life. A play that succeeds in doing so can be forgiven any number of theatrical sins. "Stick Fly," in which Lydia R. Diamond puts America's black upper class onstage, fills the bill on all counts. Yes, it's a mess, but a fascinating one, well directed by Kenny Leon and performed with total persuasiveness by his ensemble cast, and the best parts are so good that you'll be glad to forgive Ms. Diamond when she goes wrong."

== Awards and nominations ==
| Year | Award | Category | Nominee | Result |
|---|---|---|---|---|
| 2012 | Tony Award | Best Featured Actress in a Play | Condola Rashad | Nominated |
