= Grace (play) =

Play by Mick Gordon and A. C. Grayling

- Written by: Mick Gordon and A. C. Grayling
- Characters: Grace, Tony, Tom, Ruth
- Original language: English
- Genre: Drama

Premiere
- Date premiered: 2006
- Place premiered: Soho Theatre; London

Grace is a 21st-century play written by Mick Gordon and A. C. Grayling.

== Plot ==
The title character, a cynical atheist science professor, is participating in a psychology experiment in Canada in which the scientists claim to have developed a helmet that can invoke religious experiences. Grace, although skeptical (when asked what the helmet is called, she mockingly answers, "The God Helmet"), is mesmerized by the feelings she experiences while using the device. Throughout the play, she is "pulled out of the scene" and asked questions about her experiences.

Grace's son, Tom, is considering becoming a priest, and when Grace learns this, she is mortified and demonizes him in front of Tom's girlfriend, Ruth. Grace believes that anyone who tries to preach religion is being an active part of the world problems stemming from what she sees as religious fanaticism, especially violence. Tom tries to assure Grace that he's trying to form a "better religion," one that does not promote violence, but personal improvement and love. Grace stubbornly refuses to listen to Tom and after a bitter argument, the two become estranged. Meanwhile, Grace's husband, Tony, is a practicing Jew, and although he disagrees with Tom's Christian views, is far more tolerant and understanding.

Ruth tells Tom she is pregnant with his baby, and Tom considers this news the time to talk about marriage. Ruth is very reluctant to move forward, saying she is unsure of Tom's religious beliefs herself.

Off scene, Tom is killed in an Islamic terrorist attack. A heartbroken Grace uses this as an example of her reasons behind her anti-religious views during her lectures that she teaches. Ruth tells Grace Tom had requested to have his funeral at a church, but Grace refuses in a fit of rage. Ruth tries to convince Grace to fulfill Tom's wishes, but Grace makes the decision to have a small, informal, non-religious funeral ceremony. In retaliation, Ruth tells Grace she cannot see her future grandchild.

After the funeral, Grace begins to have visions of Tom through her helmet. She begins to question her own atheist views, although only mentions this to Tony. Tony recommends to Grace that she visit Ruth and tell her that she had been wrong about her views on religion. Grace sees Ruth at the cemetery paying her respects to Tom. Ruth mentions to Grace that the only reason she did not like Tom's religious views was because of her jealousy that Tom would prioritize God above her. After a heated discussion about how Grace and Tom had a toxic relationship because of her intolerance, and even after his death, Grace tells Ruth about her visions. Grace says that, although it's probably manufactured from her "God Helmet," she finds comfort in her visions of Tom after his death. In the end of the conversation, Grace and Ruth each come to the conclusion that it is not even love, but kindness, that is most important to the well-being of the world and society. Ruth and Grace reconcile their differences and in the end scene they reminisce about Tom and Grace volunteers to tend to Ruth's crying baby.

== Characters ==
- Grace A middle-aged professor, a self-described naturalist who rejects religion
- Tom Grace's son, a lawyer-turned-priest who Grace vehemently criticizes for his newly found religious views
- Ruth Tom's girlfriend who is agnostic and is reluctant to completely support Tom, but despises Grace's intolerance to Tom's views
- Tony Grace's husband, a practicing Jew who at first hides his religion from Grace out of fear
- scientist The unnamed scientist never enters the stage; only his voiceover is heard, which only Grace can hear. The scientist gives Grace directions on using the experimental "God Helmet"

== Production ==
Grace has a runtime of about 90 minutes.
