= Lydia R. Diamond =

American playwright (born 1969)

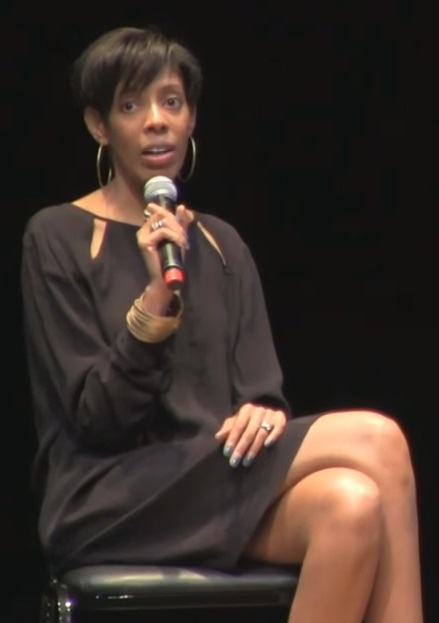
- Born: Lydia Gartin; April 14, 1969 (age 57); Detroit, Michigan, U.S.
- Education: Northwestern University (BA)
- Occupations: Playwright, professor
- Children: 1
- Writing career
- Notable works: Stick Fly; Harriet Jacobs Voyeurs de Venus

Lydia R. Diamond (born April 14, 1969, in Detroit, Michigan) is an American playwright and professor. Among her most popular plays are The Bluest Eye (2007), an adaptation of Toni Morrison's novel; Stick Fly (2008); Harriet Jacobs (2011); and Smart People (2016). Her plays have received national attention and acclaim, receiving the Lorraine Hansberry Award for Best Writing, an LA Weekly Theater Award, a Los Angeles Drama Critics Circle Award and the 2020 Horton Foote Playwriting Award from the Dramatists Guild of America.

She has taught playwriting at DePaul University, Loyola University, Columbia College Chicago, Boston University, and University of Illinois at Chicago. She is also a Huntington Playwright Fellow and a Resident Playwright at Chicago Dramatists.

== Early life ==
Lydia Diamond was born Lydia Gartin in Detroit, Michigan in April 1969. After her parents divorced when she was three, she was primarily raised by her mother. Diamond's upbringing was artistically inclined, her mother and grandparents were all musicians and educators. They moved frequently due to her mother's work, living in Amherst, Massachusetts; Carbondale, Illinois; and Waco, Texas, where she completed high school.

Her family encouraged her to pursue the violin, like her grandfather, but she discovered a love of theatre while in high school after joining the drama club. She studied theater at Northwestern University, where she switched her focus from acting to playwriting.

== Career ==
=== Early career ===
Towards the end of her college career, Diamond wrote her first play entitled, "Solitaire" which was awarded the Agnes Nixon Playwriting Award at Northwestern. After graduating from Northwestern with a B.A. in Theatre and Performance studies in 1991, she met John Diamond, who was working on getting his Ph.D. in sociology. They would marry in 1996.

Not long after college she went on to form her own Theatre company called "Another Small Black Theatre Company With Good Things To Say and A lot of Nerve Productions". Using her own company she put up Solitaire and other shows at the since closed 'Cafe Voltaire' in Chicago where her acting and writing career blossomed

=== Critical years ===
In 2004, Lydia gave birth to her son, Baylor; and John took on a teaching job at Harvard and they relocated to Boston. Diamond, who had made a name for herself in Chicago as a serious playwright, had to restart her career in New England, all while caring for a newborn. “I went from being playwright-about-town and educator to being faculty wife and new mother, without the buffer of my own community and my very close girlfriends.”

Diamond soon started to gain traction in the city. In 2006 the Huntington Theatre chose her for the Playwriting Fellows program. The Boston theatre company, Company One, produced her adaptation of Toni Morrison's novel “The Bluest Eye”; the story is that of a young black girl longing for blue eyes so that she may be seen by the world around her. Diamond also started teaching at Boston University around this time.

In 2008, Company One produced her play, "Voyeurs de Venus", which revolves around a young anthropologist who is investigating the life and exploitation of a Sarah Baartman, an African woman paraded through Europe as a sideshow attraction in the 19th century.

From 2011 to 2012, her play Stick Fly played on Broadway, in a production produced by Alicia Keys.

Her play Smart People debuted at the Huntington Theater in May 2014.

In 2017, her play The Bluest Eye was produced by the Guthrie Theater in Minneapolis, MN and the Huntington Theatre Company in Boston in 2022.

Her play Toni Stone was premiered at the Roundabout Theatre Company in New York City in 2019 and produced by the Huntington Theatre Company in Boston in 2024.

== Critical reception ==
Diamond is frequently interviewed by local and national media, including five appearances on WNYC from 2011-2020, Bostons' WGBH in 2014 and 2022, and ArtsFuse in 2024. She was interviewed by the New York Times in 2020 in a feature article on African American artists and contemporary racism.

== Works ==
- Here I Am…See Can You Handle It
- The Gift Horse (2001)
- Voyeurs de Venus (2006)
- The Bluest Eye (2007)
- Stick Fly (2008)
- Lizzie Stranton (2009)
- Harriet Jacobs (2011)
- Smart People (2016)
- Toni Stone (2019)
