= Qui Nguyen =

American playwright and screenwriter

- Born: El Dorado, Arkansas, U.S.
- Occupations: Playwright, screenwriter, director

Qui Nguyen is a Vietnamese playwright, screenwriter and director. He is best known for his plays She Kills Monsters and Vietgone. He is also known for writing Raya and the Last Dragon and Strange World.

== Career ==
He is a playwright, TV writer and screenwriter, and also an artistic director of the Obie Award and Caffe Cino Award winning Vampire Cowboys Theatre Company, whose productions, penned and choreographed by Nguyen, have performed to sold-out audiences at the New York International Fringe Festival, been published nationally in Plays and Playwrights 2005, enjoyed extended runs throughout the nation, and have been nominated for and received awards in movement and fight direction. In 2019 he won the Porter Prize.

Nguyen’s plays include Vietgone, Soul Samurai, The Inexplicable Redemption of Agent G, Alice in Slasherland, Fight Girl Battle World, Krunk Fu Battle Battle, She Kills Monsters, Trial By Water, Living Dead in Denmark, Stained Glass Ugly, A Beginner's Guide to Deicide, Men of Steel, Bike Wreck, and Vampire Cowboy Trilogy. He is a member of New Dramatists, Ensemble Studio Theatre, The Playwrights' Center, and the Ma-Yi Theater Company's Writers Lab. He also began writing for Marvel Studios in 2016. His work with the Vampire Cowboys, particularly in the staging of martial arts, puppetry and multimedia use has been documented in a dissertation from the Drama Department at Tufts University. In March 2019, he debuted Poor Yella Rednecks, a sequel to Vietgone at the South Coast Repertory in Costa Mesa, CA. In February 2020, he debuted Revenge Song, a commissioned musical, at the Geffen Playhouse in Los Angeles. "Revenge Song" was subsequently produced at the Oregon Shakespeare Festival in Ashland, Oregon in summer 2022.

Nguyen is developing a musical commissioned by the Kimmel Center for the Performing Arts with songwriter Adam Gwon.

As a screenwriter, Nguyen has written on AMC's Dispatches from Elsewhere, Netflix's The Society, Syfy's Incorporated, and PBS's Peg + Cat. He co-wrote Walt Disney Animation Studios' Raya and the Last Dragon along with Adele Lim and wrote and co-directed Disney Animation's 2022 film Strange World. In 2024, he directed the feature documentary The Family Vietgone.

== Filmography ==
=== Film ===
- 2021: Raya and the Last Dragon - story and screenplay
- 2022: Strange World - co-director and screenplay
- 2024: The Family Vietgone - director

=== Television ===
- 2012: My America - writer (1 episode)
- 2013-2018: Peg + Cat - staff writer (4 episodes)
- 2016-2017: Incorpated - staff writer (9 episodes)
- 2019: The Society - writer (1 episode) and executive story editor
- 2020: Dispatches from Elsewhere - writer (1 episode) and executive story editor
