= Hillsboro High School (Ohio) =

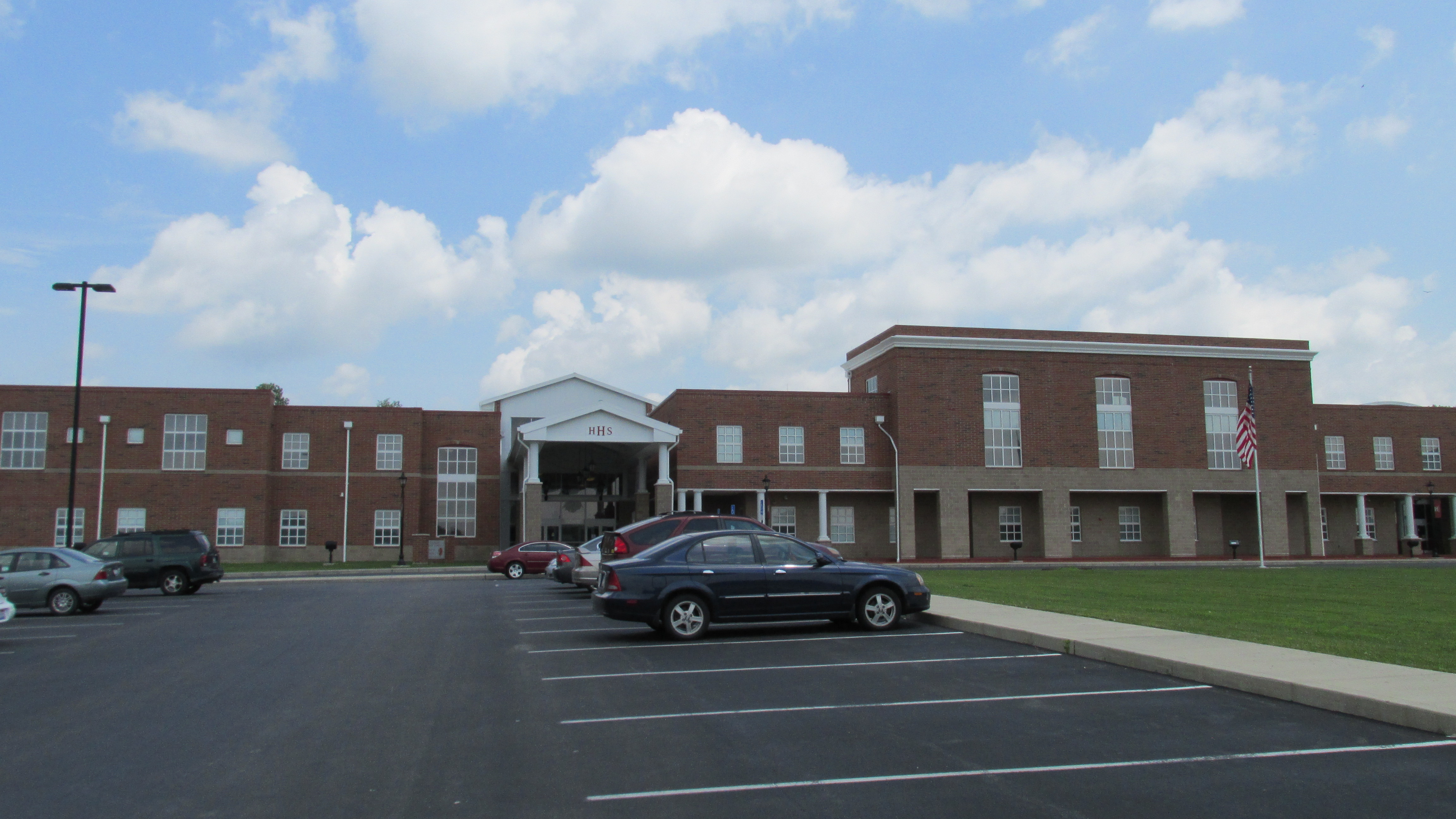
- Main entrance

Location
- 550 U.S. Route 62 South; Hillsboro, (Highland County), Ohio 45133; United States
- Coordinates: 39°11′02″N 83°36′50″W

Information
- Type: Public, Coeducational high school
- School district: Hillsboro City Schools
- Superintendent: Tim Davis
- School code: 390441201059; State School ID: OH-044123-016345
- Principal: Joe Turner
- Teaching staff: 38.00 (FTE)
- Grades: 9-12
- Student to teacher ratio: 16.50
- Colors: Red and white
- Athletics conference: Frontier Athletic Conference
- Mascot: Magenta
- Team name: Indians
- Rival: Greenfield McClain High School
- Accreditation: North Central Association of Colleges and Schools
- Yearbook: Tomahawk
- Athletic Director: Dave Dietrick
- Website: https://www.hcs-k12.org/1/home

Hillsboro High School is a public high school in Hillsboro, Ohio. It is the only high school in the Hillsboro City Schools district. The mascot is the Indian. The old high school was located at 358 W Main Street until being relocated in 2009 to 550 U.S. Route 62 South.

== Academics ==
Hillsboro High School offers Advanced Placement classes, including United States Government and Politics, Macroeconomics, United States History, World History, Biology, Calculus AB, English Literature & Composition, and English Language & Composition. The school also offers students an opportunity to enroll in courses at Southern State Community College for dual credit.

== Clubs and athletics ==
Hillsboro is home to several varsity and junior varsity athletics teams; including soccer, football, basketball, volleyball, tennis, bowling, golf, swimming, track & field, baseball, softball, and wrestling. The school hosts a National FFA Organization chapter, as well as a Quick Recall (academic) team.

In performing arts, the school has an International Thespian Society chapter (Troupe #5928) for drama students. It has a men's chorus, a women's chorus, and the auditioned HHS Symphonic Choir. The Symphonic Choir has won Superior ratings at state contest each year for more than a decade. It also provides a symphonic band that competes at OMEA. The school also provides a fall play and a spring musical that students may audition for. A concert band is offered, and band students have the opportunity to perform in the marching band, basketball pep band, a jazz band class offered during the school day, and the auditioned after-school jazz ensemble. Students may also perform at the Ohio Music Education Association Solo & Ensemble contest in January–February.

Hillsboro won its lone OHSAA team state championship back in 1928, a boys' basketball title while known as Hillsboro-Marshall High School.

== Notable alumni ==
- Joe Crawford, Former MLB player (New York Mets), Class of 1988.
- Bob McEwen, U.S. Representative from Ohio
- T. J. Turner, NFL player, Class of 1997
