= Hillsboro City Schools =

School district in Ohio

Address
- 39 Willetsville Pike Hillsboro, Ohio, 45133-8277; United States
- Coordinates: 39.2046°N 83.6197°W

District information
- Grades: PK to 12
- Superintendent: Tim Davis
- NCES District ID: 3904412
- District ID: OH-044123

Students and staff
- Students: 2,305
- Teachers: 142.54
- Student–teacher ratio: 16.17

Other information
- Website: www.hillsboro.k12.oh.us

Hillsboro City Schools, also known as Hillsboro City School District, is a school district that serves the town of Hillsboro, Ohio, United States.

== Schools ==
The district operates five schools (in alphabetical order):

- Hillsboro Early Childhood Center, Grades PK-1
- Hillsboro High School, Grades 9-12
- Hillsboro Intermediate School, Grades 4-5
- Hillsboro Middle School, Grades 6-8
- Hillsboro Primary School, Grades 2-3
