= The Bishop Misbehaves (play) =

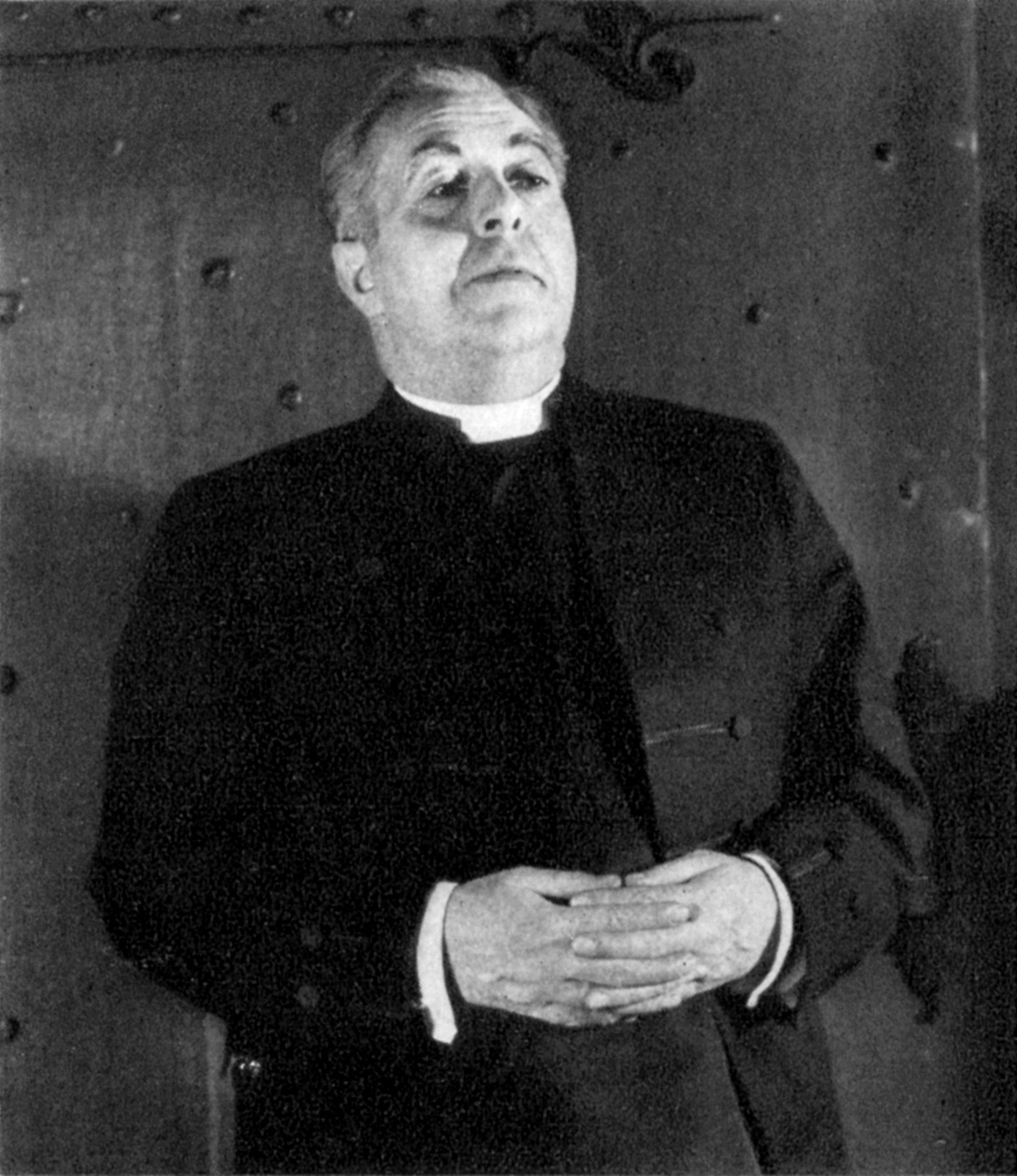
Walter Connolly as the Bishop of Broadminster in the Broadway production of The Bishop Misbehaves (1935)

The Bishop Misbehaves is a comedy crime play written by Frederick J. Jackson. It premiered at the Phoenix Theatre in London on 23 September 1934. It opened on Broadway on 20 February 1935, where the American critics were more impressed than those in London had been. It ran for 121 performances at the Cort Theatre. It portrays the avid reader of detective fiction, the Bishop of Broadminster, being accidentally drawn into a mysterious case that occurs near his cathedral.

== Film and TV adaptations ==
- In 1935 the play was adapted into a film produced by Metro-Goldwyn-Mayer, directed by Ewald André Dupont and starring Edmund Gwenn and Maureen O'Sullivan.
- Gene Lockhart and Alice Pearce starred in a TV adaptation of the play for Broadway Television Theater, a syndicated series, which aired 22 September 1952.

== Bibliography ==
- Kabatchnik, Amnon. Blood on the Stage, 1925-1950: Milestone Plays of Crime, Mystery and Detection. Scarecrow Press, 2010.
