= Pacific Playwrights Festival =

Annual theatre festival in California, USA

The Pacific Playwrights Festival (PPF), a national forum for playwrights and theatre leaders, is dedicated to developing and producing new American plays. It is held every summer at South Coast Repertory in Costa Mesa, California.

Within the American theatre there is an ongoing need for playwrights to have the opportunity to develop new work with the support of a community of artists. In recent years, many programs that did exist have been redirected or ended. The goal of PPF is to provide a gathering place for writers and theatre leaders to meet informally, sharing ideas and interests as new projects emerge.

The Festival includes public play readings that showcase new works by established and emerging writers, as well as two world premiere productions.

== Festival history ==
1998

- Hurrah at Last by Richard Greenberg (Production - dir. David Warren)†
- Walking Off the Roof by Anthony Clarvoe (Workshop - dir. Bill Rauch)
- Landlocked by Cusi Cram (Workshop - dir. Juliette Carrillo)
- On the Jump by John Glore (Reading - dir. Lee Shallat-Chemel)†
- Dogeaters by Jessica Hagedorn (Reading - dir. Michael Greif)
- The Hollow Lands by Howard Korder (Reading - dir. David Chambers)†
- The Mechanics by Chris Van Groningen (Reading - dir. Andrew Robinson)
- The Sins of Sor Juana by Karen Zacarias (Reading - dir. Lisa Portes)

1999

- On the Jump by John Glore (Production - dir. Mark Rucker)†
- References to Salvador Dalí Make Me Hot by Jose Rivera (Workshop - dir. Juliette Carrillo)†
- Illuminating Veronica by Rogelio Martinez (Workshop - dir. Lisa Portes)
- Cuchifrito by Eduardo Andino (Reading - dir. Octavio Solis)
- Lupe, Now! by Jonathan Ceniceroz (Reading - dir. Luis Alfaro)
- The Beginning of August by Tom Donaghy (Reading - dir. Neal Pepe)
- Everett Beekin by Richard Greenberg (Reading - dir. Mark Rucker)†
- The Mystery of Attraction by Marlane Meyer (Reading - Jody McAuliffe)
- God of Vengeance by Donald Margulies (Reading - Gordon Edelstein)
- The Altruists by Nicky Silver (Reading - dir. David Warren)

2000

- "The Education of Randy Newman" words and music by Randy Newman conceived by Michael Roth, Jerry Patch and Mr. Newman (Production - dir. Myron Johnson)
- The End of It All by Cusi Cram (Workshop - dir. Lisa Portes)†
- Fighting Words by Sunil Kuruvilla (Workshop - dir. Martin Benson)
- Hortensia and the Museum of Dreams by Nilo Cruz (Reading - dir. Diane Rodriguez)
- Vieques by Jorge Gonzalez (Reading - dir. Mark Rucker)
- Kimberly Akimbo by David Lindsay-Abaire (Reading - dir. Mark Rucker)†
- The Butterfly Collection by Theresa Rebeck (Reading - dir. Bartlett Sher)†
- The Beard of Avon by Amy Freed (Reading - dir. David Emmes)†
- Dulce de Leche by Daniel Goldfarb (Reading - dir. John Pasquin)
- Tom Walker by John Strand (Reading - dir. Kyle Donnelly)

2001

- The Beard of Avon by Amy Freed (Production - dir. David Emmes)†
- California Scenarios by Luis Alfaro, Joann Farías, José Cruz González, Anne García-Romero and Octavio Solis (Workshop - dir. Juliette Carrillo)†
- Nostalgia by Lucinda Coxon (Workshop - dir. Loretta Greco)†
- Sweaty Palms by Alejandro Morales (Reading - dir. Lisa Portes)
- Tight Embrace by Jorge Ignacio Cortiñas (Reading - dir. Ruben Polendo)†
- Hold Please by Annie Weisman (Reading - dir. Mark Rucker)†
- Eye to Eye by Kevin Heelan (Reading - dir. Seret Scott)
- Getting Frankie Married — and Afterwards by Horton Foote (Reading - dir. Martin Benson)
- Scab by Sheila Callaghan (Reading - dir. Olivia Honegger)
- The Falls by Hilary Bell (Reading - dir. Liz Diamond)

2002

- Getting Frankie Married — and Afterwards by Horton Foote (Production - dir. Martin Benson)
- The Dazzle by Richard Greenberg (Production - dir. Mark Rucker)
- 99 Histories by Julia Cho (Reading - dir. Chay Yew)
- Exposed by Beth Henley (Reading - dir. Mark Rucker)†
- Intimate Apparel by Lynn Nottage (Reading - dir. Kate Whoriskey)†
- Truth and Beauty by Steven Drukman (Reading - dir. Ethan McSweeny)
- Our Boy by Julia Jordan (Reading - dir. Lisa Peterson)†

2003

- Intimate Apparel by Lynn Nottage (Production - dir. Kate Whoriskey)†
- The Intelligent Design of Jenny Chow by Rolin Jones (Production - dir. David Chambers)
- The Hiding Place by Jeff Whitty (Workshop - dir. Mark Rucker)
- Safe in Hell by Amy Freed (Reading - dir. David Emmes)†
- Anna in the Tropics by Nilo Cruz (Reading - dir. Juliette Carrillo)
- Sea of Tranquillity by Howard Korder (Reading - dir. Michael Bloom)†
- Brooklyn Boy by Donald Margulies (Reading - dir. Daniel Sullivan)†

2004

- Safe in Hell by Amy Freed (Production - dir. David Emmes)†
- Mr. Marmalade by Noah Haidle (Production - dir. Ethan McSweeny)
- Vesuvius by Lucinda Coxon (Reading - dir. David Emmes)†
- The Clean House by Sarah Ruhl (Reading - dir. Bill Rauch)
- Singing Forest by Craig Lucas (Reading - dir. Bartlett Sher)
- Safe as Houses by Richard Greenberg (Reading - dir. Ethan McSweeny)

2005

- A Naked Girl on the Appian Way by Richard Greenberg (Production - dir. Mark Rucker)†
- Vesuvius by Lucinda Coxon (Production - dir. David Emmes)†
- Tough Titty by Oni Faida Lampley (Workshop - dir. Mark Rucker)†
- Bossa Nova by Kirsten Greenidge (Reading - dir. Casey Stangl)†
- The Further Adventures of Hedda Gabler by Jeff Whitty (Reading - dir. Bill Rauch)†
- Rabbit Hole by David Lindsay-Abaire (Reading - dir. Carolyn Cantor)†
- Ridiculous Fraud by Beth Henley (Reading - dir. Sharon Ott)

2006

- The Studio written, directed and choreographed by Christopher d'Amboise (Production)
- Blue Door by Tanya Barfield (Production - dir. Leah C. Gardiner)
- Leitmotif by Victoria Stewart (Workshop - dir. Jessica Kubzansky)†
- Human Error by Keith Reddin (Reading - dir. Les Waters)
- Empty Sky by Sarah Treem (Reading - dir. Bill Rauch)
- System Wonderland by David Wiener (Reading - dir. Art Manke)†
- The Piano Teacher by Julia Cho (Reading - dir. Kate Whoriskey)†

2007

- My Wandering Boy by Julie Marie Myatt (Production - dir. Bill Rauch)
- System Wonderland by David Wiener (Production - dir. David Emmes)†
- Po' Boy Tango by Kenneth Lin (Workshop - dir. Chay Yew)†
- Shipwrecked! The Amazing Adventures of Louis de Rougemont (As Told by Himself) — An Entertainment by Donald Margulies (Reading - dir. Bart DeLorenzo)†
- Boleros for the Disenchanted by José Rivera (Reading - dir. Octavio Solis)†
- Our Mother's Brief Affair by Richard Greenberg (Reading - dir. Pam MacKinnon)†
- An Italian Straw Hat book and lyrics by John Strand, music by Dennis McCarthy (Reading - dir. Stefan Novinski)†

2008

- What They Have by Kate Robin (Production - dir. Chris Fields)†
- The Injured Party by Richard Greenberg (Production - dir. Trip Cullman)†
- Sunlight by Sharr White (Workshop - dir. David Emmes)†
- By the Way, Meet Vera Stark by Lynn Nottage (Reading - dir. Mark Rucker)†
- Emilie—La Marquise du Châtelet Defends her Life at the Petit Théâtre at Cirey Tonight by Lauren Gunderson (Reading - dir. Kate Whoriskey)†
- Goldfish by John Kolvenbach (Reading - dir. Loretta Greco)†
- You, Nero by Amy Freed, (Reading - dir. Sharon Ott)†

2009

- Our Mother's Brief Affair by Richard Greenberg (Production - dir. Pam MacKinnon)†
- Emilie—La Marquise Du Châtelet Defends her Life at the Petit Théâtre at Cirey Tonight by Lauren Gunderson (Production - dir. David Emmes)†
- In a Garden by Howard Korder (Reading - dir. David Warren)
- Doctor Cerberus by Roberto Aguirre-Sacasa (Reading - dir. Bart DeLorenzo)†
- Extraordinary Chambers by David Wiener (Reading - dir. Art Manke)*
- 9 Circles by Bill Cain (Reading - dir. Michael John Garcés)
- The Language Archive by Julia Cho (Reading - dir. Mark Brokaw)

2010

- The Language Archive by Julia Cho (Production - dir. Mark Brokaw)
- Doctor Cerberus by Roberto Aguirre-Sacasa (Production - dir. Bart DeLorenzo)†
- Completeness by Itamar Moses (Reading - dir. Pam MacKinnon)
- Happy Face by David West Read (Reading - dir. Art Manke)
- Between Us Chickens by Sofia Alvarez (Reading - dir. Casey Stangl)
- Right to the Top by Amy Freed (Reading - dir. Doug Hughes)
- Kin by Bathsheba Doran (Reading - dir. Sam Gold)

2011

- Silent Sky by Lauren Gunderson (Production - dir. Anne Justine D'Zmura)†
- Completeness by Itamar Moses (Production - dir. Pam MacKinnon)
- The Prince of Atlantis by Steven Drukman (Reading - dir. Dámaso Rodríguez)
- How the World Began by Catherine Trieschmann (Reading - dir. Shelley Butler)
- The Droll {Or, a stage-play about the END of theatre} by Meg Miroshnik (Reading - dir. David Chambers)
- Annapurna by Sharr White (Reading - dir. Loretta Greco)†
- Cloudlands book by Octavio Solis, music by Adam Gwon, lyrics by Octavio Solis and Adam Gwon (Reading - dir. Octavio Solis)†

2012

- The Prince of Atlantis by Steven Drukman (Production - dir. Warner Shook)
- Cloudlands book by Octavio Solis, music by Adam Gwon, lyrics by Octavio Solis and Adam Gwon (Production - dir. Amanda Dehnert)†
- Warrior Class by Kenneth Lin (Reading - dir. Evan Cabnet)
- You Are Here by Melissa Ross (Reading - dir. Matt Shakman)
- I and You by Lauren Gunderson (Reading - dir. Meredith McDonough)†
- The Few by Samuel D. Hunter (Reading - dir. Casey Stangl)
- Smokefall by Noah Haidle (Reading - dir. Anne Kauffman)

2013

- Smokefall by Noah Haidle (Production - dir. Anne Kauffman)
- The Parisian Woman by Beau Willimon (Production - dir. Pam MacKinnon)
- Trudy and Max in Love by Zoe Kazan (Reading - dir. Lila Neugebauer)†
- Hope and Gravity by Michael Hollinger (Reading - dir. Aaron Posner)
- Fast Company by Carla Ching (Reading - dir. Shelley Butler)
- Reunion by Gregory S Moss (Reading - dir. Adrienne Campbell-Holt)
- Marjorie Prime by Jordan Harrison (Reading - dir. Pam MacKinnon)

2014

- Rest by Samuel D. Hunter (Production - dir. Martin Benson)
- Five Mile Lake by Rachel Bonds (Production - dir. Daniella Topol)
- The Purple Lights of Joppa Illinois by Adam Rapp (Production - dir. Crispin Whittell)†
- Zealot by Theresa Rebeck (Reading - dir. Marc Masterson)
- Future Thinking by Eliza Clark (Reading - dir. Lila Neugebauer)†
- Mr. Wolf by Rajiv Joseph (Reading - dir. Matt Shakman)†
- Of Good Stock by Melissa Ross (Reading - dir. Lynne Meadow)†

2015

- Of Good Stock by Melissa Ross (Production - dir. Gaye Taylor Upchurch)†
- Mr. Wolf by Rajiv Joseph (Production - dir. David Emmes)†
- Going to a Place where you Already Are by Bekah Brunstetter (Reading - dir. Marc Masterson)†
- The Whistleblower by Itamar Moses (Reading - dir. Casey Stangl)*
- Orange: An Illustrated Play by Aditi Brennan Kapil (Reading - dir. Jessica Kubzansky)†
- Vietgone by Qui Nguyen (Reading - dir. May Adrales)†

2016

- Future Thinking by Eliza Clark (Production - dir. Lila Neugebauer)†
- Office Hour by Julia Cho (Production - dir. Neel Keller)†
- A Perfect Circle by Noah Haidle (Reading - dir. Evan Cabnet)
- Little Black Shadows by Kemp Powers (Reading - dir. May Adrales)
- Curve of Departure by Rachel Bonds (Reading - dir. Mike Donahue)†
- Lady Tattoo by Meg Miroshnik (Reading - dir. Marti Lyons)†
- Wink by Jen Silverman (Reading - dir. Bart DeLorenzo)

2017

- The Siegel by Michael Mitnick (Production - dir. Casey Stangl)
- A Doll's House, Part 2 by Lucas Hnath (Production - dir. Shelley Butler)†
- Yoga Play by Dipika Guha (Reading - dir. Crispin Whittell)†
- SHREW! by Amy Freed (Reading - dir. Sharon Ott)
- Anacostia Street Lions by Tearrance Arvelle Chisholm (Reading - dir. Michael John Garcés)
- Long Lost by Donald Margulies (Reading - dir. Casey Stangl)
- Cambodian Rock Band by Lauren Yee (Reading - dir. May Adrales)†

2018

- SHREW! by Amy Freed (Production - dir. Art Manke)
- Little Black Shadows by Kemp Powers (Production - dir. May Adrales)
- Poor Yella Rednecks by Qui Nguyen (Reading - dir. May Adrales)†
- Love and Contracts by Julia Doolittle (Reading - dir. Moritz von Stuelpnagel)†
- Sheepdog by Kevin Artigue (Reading - dir. Leah C. Gardiner)
- I Get Restless by Caroline V. McGraw (Reading - dir. Jennifer Chambers)
- House of Joy by Madhuri Shekar (Reading - dir. Shelley Butler)

2019

- Poor Yella Rednecks by Qui Nguyen (Production - dir. May Adrales)†
- Sheepdog by Kevin Artigue (Production - dir. Leah C. Gardiner)
- Prelude to a Kiss music by Dan Messé, lyrics by Sean Hartley & Dan Messé, book by Craig Lucas (Reading - dir. David Ivers)†
- The Canadians by Adam Bock (Reading - dir. Jaime Castañeda)†
- Mask Only by Ana Nogueira (Reading - dir. Mike Donahue)†
- Unlikeable Heroine by Melissa Ross (Reading - dir. Gaye Taylor Upchurch)†
- Whitelisted by Chisa Hutchinson (Reading - dir. Sarah Rasmussen)†

2020 Note: The 2020 Festival was canceled due to the COVID-19 pandemic.

2021 Note: The 2021 Festival was offered exclusively in digital format, with high-quality video production, professionally filmed with a multi-camera setup.

- Covenant by York Walker (dir. Tamilla Woodard)
- Coleman '72 by Charlie Oh (dir. David Ivers)
- Park-e Lahleh by Shayan Lotfi (dir. Mike Donahue)
- Clean/Espejos by Christine Quintana (dir. Lisa Portes)
- Harold & Lillian book and lyrics by Dan Collins, music by Julianne Wick Davis (dir. Mike Donahue)

2022

- Clean/Espejos by Christine Quintana (Production dir. Lisa Portes)
- A Million Tiny Pieces by Spenser Davis (dir. David Ivers)†
- how to roll a blunt by Naomi Lorrain (dir. Colette Robert)
- avaaz by Michael Shayan (dir. Moritz von Stuelpnagel)
- love you long time (already) by Katie Do (dir. Mei Ann Teo)
- Bite Me by Eliana Pipes (dir. Jennifer Chang)
- Dr. Silver: A Celebration of Life created by Anika & Britta Johnson, music & lyrics by Anika & Britta Johnson, book by Nick Green (dir. Logan Vaughn)

2023

- avaaz by Michael Shayan (Production dir. Moritz von Stuelpnagel)
- Coleman '72 by Charlie Oh (Production dir. Chay Yew)
- Dr. Silver created by Anika & Britta Johnson, music & lyrics by Anika & Britta Johnson, book by Nick Green (dir. Logan Vaughn)
- Chapters of a Floating Life by Clarence Coo (dir. Jesca Prudencio)
- The Staircase by Noa Gardner (dir. Gaye Taylor Upchurch)†
- Crasiss by Bleu Beckford-Burrell (dir. Lili-Anne Brown)†
- Galilee, 34 written & directed by Eleanor Burgess

2024

- Prelude to a Kiss, The Musical music by Daniel Messé, lyrics by Sean Hartley and Daniel Messé, book by Craig Lucas (Production dir. David Ivers)†
- Galilee, 34 by Eleanor Burgess (Production dir. Davis MaCallum)
- Meeting for Worship by Ana Nogueira (dir. Mike Donahue)†
- The Brothers Play by Arya Shahi (dir. Knud Adams)
- Fremont Ave. by Reggie D. White (dir. Taylor Reynolds)
- An Oxford Man by Else Went (dir. Emma Rosa Went)
- You Are Cordially Invited to the End of the World! by Keiko Green (dir. Zi Alikhan)

2025

- You Are Cordially Invited to the End of the World! by Keiko Green (Production dir. Zi Alikhan)
- The Staircase by Noa Gardner (Production dir. Gaye Taylor Upchurch)†
- rachel, nevada by jose sebastian alberdi (dir. Laura Dupper)
- The Red Man by JuCoby Johnson (dir. H. Adam Harris)
- Ten Grand by Kate Cortesi (dir. by Rebecca Wear)†
- Trip Around the Sun by Jake Brasch (dir. by Shelley Butler)
- Eat Me by Talene Monahon (dir. Josiah Davis)

2026

- Fremont Ave. by Reggie D. White (Production dir. Lili-Anne Brown)
- Eat Me by Talene Monahon (Production dir. Caitlin Sullivan)†
- The Ingenue by Eleanor Burgess (dir. Hannah Wolf)
- Three-headed Monster by JuCoby Johnson (dir. H. Adam Harris)
- Advanced Persistent Teenagers by Deepak Kumar (dir. by Morgan Green)
- Pleasers by Avery Deutsch (dir. by Laura Dupper)
- Blow Away the Clouds by Evelina Fernández (dir. Jose Luis Valenzuela)†

†Commissioned by South Coast Repertory
