= Sharon Ott =

American director and producer

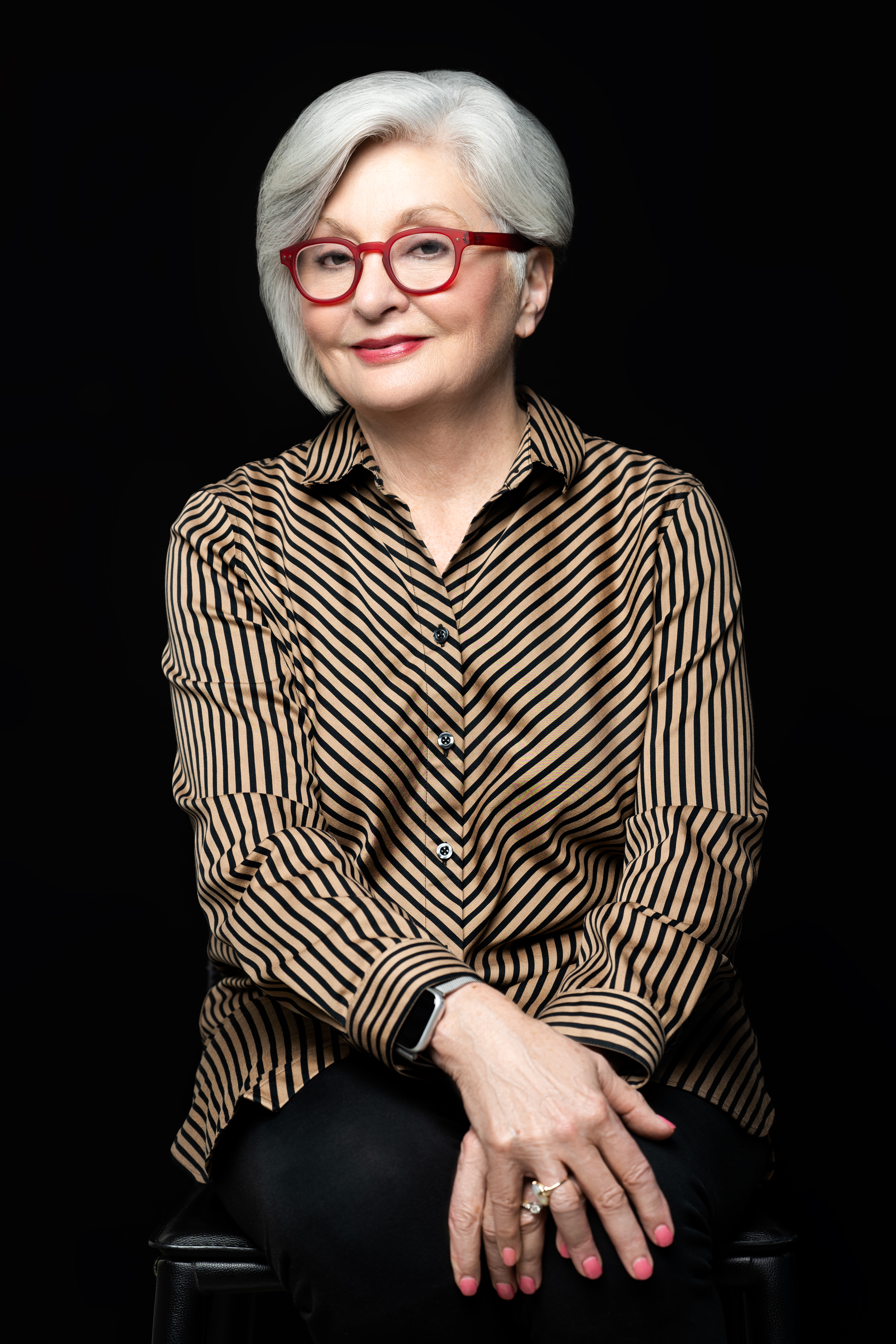
Sharon Ott

Sharon Langston Ott (20th century) is a director, producer and educator who worked in regional theaters and opera throughout the United States. Two plays she directed, A Fierce Longing and Amlin Gray's How I Got That Story, each won an Obie award after their New York runs.

== Education and early career as an actor ==
Sharon Ott received her BS from Bennington College in 1972 having majored in theater and anthropology. During her years there, she received a fellowship from the National Science Foundation to work on an archaeological site in northern Arizona. She was accepted into the MFA acting program at Cal Arts under the direction of Dr. Herbert Blau. When Blau left Cal Arts, his students followed him to Oberlin College, forming the ensemble Kraken under his leadership. This group of young actors included Julie Taymor (director of The Lion King, Titus Andronicus, and Frida,) and noted clown and actor, Bill Irwin.

After two years with Kraken, Ott joined the ensemble Camera Obscura, a resident company at La Mama Experimental Theater Club in New York, and the Mickery Theater in Amsterdam, the Netherlands. Their work was presented at La Mama, The Mickery, and in other theaters throughout Germany, Belgium, and the Netherlands.

Ott left Europe to return to the United States where she formed her own theater company, Aleph. Aleph's work was presented in Los Angeles before they were hired as the company in residence at the University of Wisconsin/Milwaukee.

While in Milwaukee, Ott developed an interest in the work of Theatre X, eventually joined the company, and directed several productions for the company including The Wreck: A Romance, based on the poems of Adrienne Rich, and A Fierce Longing based on the life and work of Japanese novelist Yukio Mishima. The Wreck was presented at theater festivals in the United States and the Netherlands, and the company received an Obie award for A Fierce Longing after its run at New York City's Performing Garage.

Ott became resident director of the Milwaukee Repertory Theater in 1980. During her association with the Milwaukee Rep, she was able to travel to Japan twice to work with productions she directed. She also directed the world premiere of her then husband, Amlin Gay's How I Got That Story at the Milwaukee Rep, which won an Obie award after its New York run.

== Berkeley Repertory Theatre ==
In 1984, Sharon Ott became artistic director of the Berkeley Repertory Theatre, in Berkeley, California. During her 13 years in that position, she grew the company's budget to $5 million, built the audience to 15,000 subscribers, and improved the company's reputation to win the Regional Theatre Tony Award for Excellence in 1997. She worked with author Philip Kan Gotanda, directing world premieres of Yankee Dawg You Die, and The Ballad of Yachiyo, as well as a production of The Was in New York and Los Angeles. Ott also directed an adaptation of Maxine Hong Kingston's The Woman Warrior that premiered at Berkeley Rep before moving on to productions in Boston and Los Angeles. She directed the national tour of Anna Deavere Smith's Twilight: Los Angeles which started in San Francisco before touring to Boston, Houston, Seattle, New Haven, and Washington, DC where it was performed at the Ford's Theater with then President Bill Clinton and Vice-President Al Gore in attendance.

== Seattle Repertory Theatre ==
Ott left Berkeley in 1997 to become the artistic director of the Seattle Repertory Theatre. Under her leadership, a successful $15 endowment campaign was completed, and the Rep's annual budget grew from $6 million to $9. She maintained a subscription audience of 14,000 and grew the overall audience for the Rep from 14,040 in the year prior to her arrival to a high of 14,500. Ott re-introduced the classics to the Seattle Rep audiences, directing Shakespeare and Saw herself, and producing the work of Stephen Wadsworth, Mary Zimmerman, and Tina Landau. She maintained the Rep's long-term association with August Wilson, producing the world premiere of Wilson's King Hedley II and How I Learned What I Learned, Wilson's autobiographical solo performance work. Ott also produced the world premiere work of several major new artists to the Rep, such as Ping Chong, Phillip Kan Gotanda, and Nilo Cruz.

== Guest directing and opera ==
Sharon Ott has been a guest director at such theaters as the Arena Stage, the New York Shakespeare Festival, La Jolla Playhouse, the Mark Taper Forum, South Coast Repertory Theatre, the Huntington Theater, the Alliance Theater, Playwrights' Horizons and the Manhattan Theater Club. She has also directed several operas, including La Boheme and The Conquistador at San Diego Opera, Vanessa and Salome at Seattle Opera, Don Giovanni at Opera Colorado, and Bluebeard's Castle at the Seattle Symphony with sets by Dale Chihuly.

== Recent work ==
Most recently, she directed the stage reading of Amy Freed's You, Nero at South Coast Repertory's 2008 Pacific Playwrights Festival, and is scheduled to direct the play's world premiere at South Coast Repertory followed by a production at the Berkeley Repertory Theatre in 2009. She is a member of the Stage Directors and Choreographers Society and remains somewhat active within the union, currently serving on the executive board.

== Educational career ==
Ott began her theatrical career as an actor, and taught acting at the University of Wisconsin-Milwaukee. She then served as a guest lecturer at the University of Washington. Ott finally received her MFA in 2015 from the Savannah College of Art and Design while working there as professor and artistic director. Ott joined the faculty at Virginia Commonwealth University in the fall of 2017 to serve as professor and department chair. Virginia Commonwealth University School of the Arts is the number-one-ranked public school for arts and designs in the country by the News and World Report. Ott's arrival coincides with noted researcher and actor Dr. Keith Byron Kirk. Since 2024, she has been the director of the University of Houston School of Theatre and Dance and executive director of the Houston Shakespeare Festival.
