= Austin Butler =

American actor (born 1991)

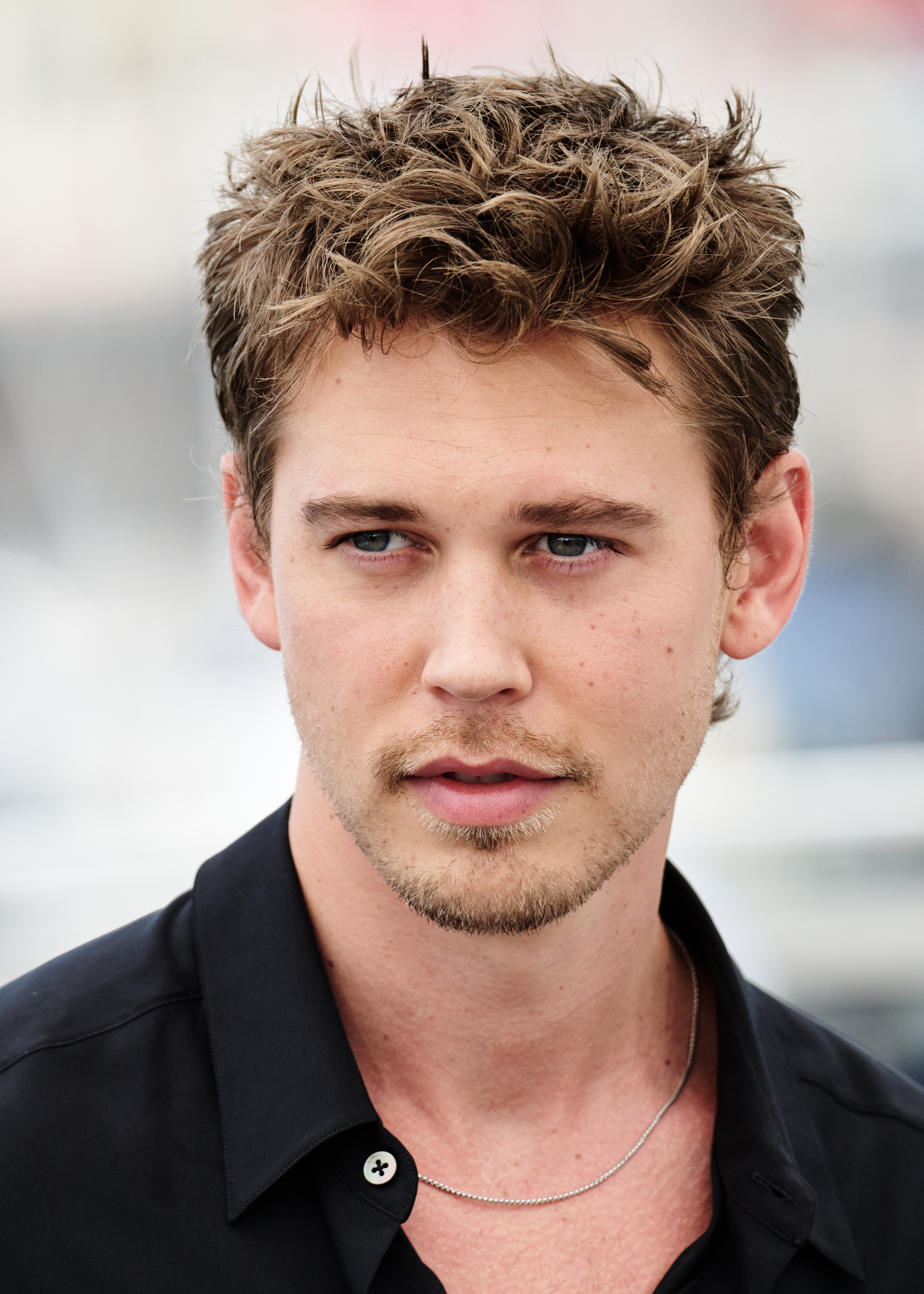
- Butler in 2025
- Born: Austin Robert Butler; August 17, 1991 (age 35); Anaheim, California, U.S.
- Occupation: Actor
- Years active: 2005–present
- Awards: Full list

Austin Robert Butler (born August 17, 1991) is an American actor. Known for his performances on stage and screen, he has received a British Academy Film Award and Golden Globe Award as well as nominations for an Academy Award, two Critics' Choice Awards, and two Screen Actors Guild Awards. He was named by Time magazine as one of the 100 most influential people in the world in 2023.

Butler began his career on television, appearing in sitcoms on Disney Channel and Nickelodeon, most notably on Zoey 101 (2007–2008), and later in teen dramas, including recurring parts on The CW's Life Unexpected (2010–2011) and Switched at Birth (2011–2012). He went on to star in The Carrie Diaries (2013–2014) and The Shannara Chronicles (2016–2017).

Butler's film breakthrough came as Tex Watson in Quentin Tarantino's period dramedy Once Upon a Time in Hollywood (2019). He gained wider recognition for portraying Elvis Presley in Baz Luhrmann's biopic Elvis (2022), which earned him a BAFTA Award and Golden Globe Award, as well as a nomination for the Academy Award for Best Actor. He has since starred in Denis Villeneuve's sci-fi epic Dune: Part Two (2024) and in Darren Aronofsky's crime thriller Caught Stealing (2025). He has also starred in the Apple TV+ miniseries Masters of the Air (2024).

On stage, Butler made his Broadway debut in the revival of Eugene O'Neill's The Iceman Cometh (2018).

== Early life and education ==
Butler was born on August 17, 1991, in Anaheim, California, the son of Lori Anne (née Howell), an aesthetician, and David Butler who is of Irish descent. The two divorced when he was seven. He has an older sister, Ashley (b. 1986), who worked as a background actress alongside him on Ned's Declassified School Survival Guide. His maternal great-great-grandparents, Matti Matinpoika Sillanpää and Liisa Jaakontytär Järvelä, were Finnish immigrants from Ostrobothnia, Finland, who settled in Wisconsin.

When Butler was thirteen, he was approached by a representative from a background acting management company at the Orange County Fair who helped him get started in the entertainment industry. He found that he enjoyed it and soon began taking acting classes. Butler attended public school until the seventh grade, when he left to be homeschooled to better accommodate his work schedule. He continued his homeschooling until the tenth grade and later passed the CHSPE, the state's high school equivalency diploma exam.

== Career ==
=== 2005–2018: Career beginnings ===
In 2005, after working as an extra on several television series including Unfabulous and Drake & Josh, Butler landed his first regular job as a background actor playing the role of Zippy Brewster for two seasons on Nickelodeon's Ned's Declassified School Survival Guide. His friend on the show, Lindsey Shaw, introduced him to her manager, Pat Cutler, who signed him and launched his career. From that point on, Butler began taking acting seriously as a career. In May 2007, Butler landed a guest starring role on the Disney Channel series Hannah Montana playing the role of Derek Hanson opposite actress Miley Cyrus, and in September of that same year, he portrayed Jake Krandle in the episode "iLike Jake" on the Nickelodeon series iCarly.

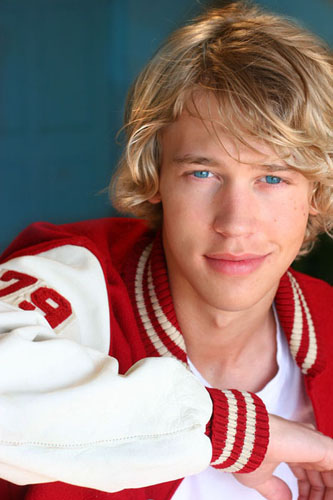
Butler in 2008

In February 2008, Butler landed a main role on another Nickelodeon series, Zoey 101, playing James Garrett, the love interest of Jamie Lynn Spears's title character Zoey in the fourth season; previously, he guest starred on the same show playing the role of Danifer on the third-season episode "Quarantine". In March of that year, he appeared in an episode of the Cartoon Network sitcom, Out of Jimmy's Head, playing the role of Lance in the episode titled "Princess".

In July 2009, Butler starred in 20th Century Fox's family adventure film Aliens in the Attic portraying Jake Pearson. In the film, his character, along with his family, battles to save their vacation home and the world from an alien invasion. That same summer, Butler appeared in the starring role of Jordan Gallagher on the ABC Family series Ruby & the Rockits.

In February 2010, Butler landed a recurring role as Jones on the CW series Life Unexpected, Later that year, he guest-starred in episodes of the Disney Channel sitcoms Wizards of Waverly Place and Jonas as well as on CSI: Miami and The Defenders. Also in 2010, Butler's Aliens in the Attic co-star Ashley Tisdale invited him to audition for a lead role in the film Sharpay's Fabulous Adventure, a spin-off of Disney's High School Musical franchise that followed the adventures of Sharpay Evans after high school as she tries to get her big break on Broadway. In the film, Butler plays Peyton Leverette, the love interest of Sharpay. Regarding his casting, Butler told Week In Rewind, "I had worked with Ashley once, and then I heard about the movie, because she called me and said, 'Austin, I want you to come and read for the director for this—I think you'd be perfect.' So, I went and met with the director, and it went really well, and I ended up doing the movie." The film was released direct to DVD on April 19, 2011.

In 2011, he booked the recurring role of Wilke on the ABC Family series Switched at Birth, debuting on June 27, 2011. In the same year, he signed on to play the lead role of Zack Garvey in the Lifetime television film The Bling Ring, made by Dick Clark Productions and directed by Michael Lembeck, based on the burglary group of the same name who targeted the homes of Hollywood's celebrities. The film was released on September 26, 2011. In January 2012, Butler guest-starred on the NBC comedy Are You There, Chelsea?

In his early twenties, Butler continued to act in teen-oriented television series, but gained greater recognition for his starring roles in The Carrie Diaries and later The Shannara Chronicles; he also branched out into new stage and film projects. In March 2012, Butler was cast in The CW's Sex and the City prequel series The Carrie Diaries to play Sebastian Kydd, a brooding heartthrob attending the same high school as Carrie Bradshaw, played by AnnaSophia Robb. The Carrie Diaries is based on Candace Bushnell's novel by the same name and follows Bradshaw's life in the 1980s as a teenager in New York City. The show was cancelled after two seasons.

In April 2014, it was announced that Butler had joined the cast of the play Death of the Author at the Geffen Playhouse in Los Angeles. He played the role of Bradley, a pre-law student with a double major in political science and math who is set to graduate from a wealthy university. The play was directed by Bart DeLorenzo and written by Steven Drukman. Following previews on May 20, 2014, the play ran from May 28 to June 29.

Butler then joined the cast of Arrow in the recurring role of Chase. His character was a DJ and a love interest of Willa Holland's character Thea Queen. He co-starred with Miranda Cosgrove and Tom Sizemore in the 2015 thriller film The Intruders, and appeared in Kevin Smith's 2016 horror-comedy film Yoga Hosers about 15-year-old yoga nuts Colleen Collette and Colleen McKenzie. The film also stars Johnny Depp, Lily-Rose Depp, Harley Quinn Smith and Haley Joel Osment. In 2016, he began playing the role of Wil Ohmsford in The Shannara Chronicles, MTV's television adaptation of the Terry Brooks novel The Elfstones of Shannara. The series was cancelled after two seasons.

Butler made his Broadway debut playing Don Parritt, the "lost boy" in The Iceman Cometh, which starred Denzel Washington and David Morse. Previews for the limited run began in March 2018, and the play closed in July 2018. Per Hilton Als's review of the play in The New Yorker: "Although there are many performers in George C. Wolfe's staging of Eugene O'Neill's phenomenal [...] drama, The Iceman Cometh, [...] there is only one actor, and his name is Austin Butler."

=== 2019–present: Breakthrough and stardom ===
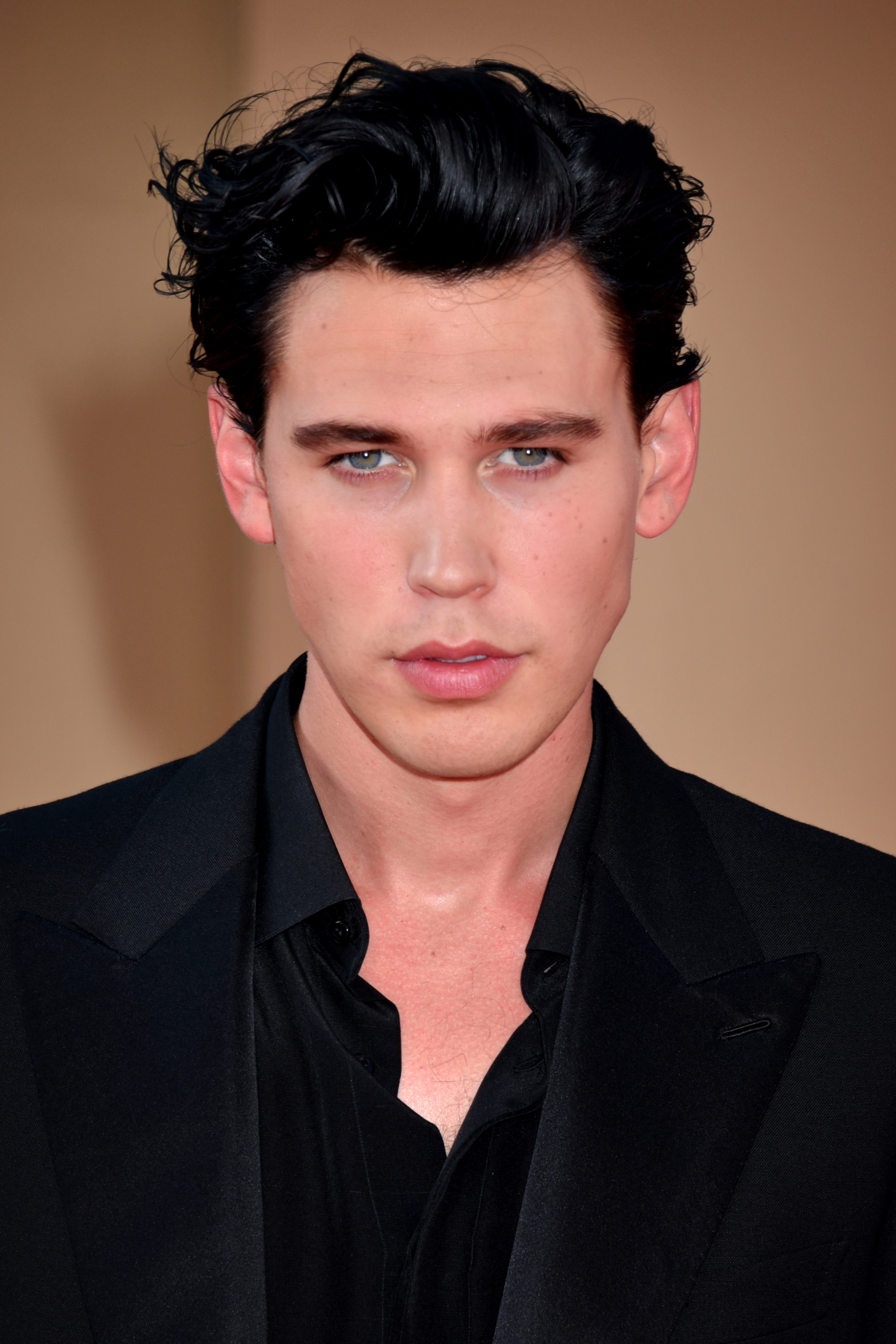
Butler at the premiere of Once Upon a Time in Hollywood in 2019

In 2019, Butler appeared in the Quentin Tarantino film Once Upon a Time in Hollywood as a fictional version of Manson Family member Tex Watson. Though he had limited screen time, his performance has been described as "intense" and "brooding". He received numerous nominations as a member of the film's ensemble cast. In that same year, Butler was cast as Elvis Presley in the biopic Elvis, directed by Baz Luhrmann. The film premiered at the 2022 Cannes Film Festival. Butler's performance received critical acclaim, as well as praise from the Presley family. He described the part as "the most intimidating thing I've ever done. I honestly didn't sleep for about two years." The role earned him several nominations for Best Actor awards, including the Academy Award, BAFTA, Critics' Choice, Golden Globe and SAG Awards, winning the BAFTA and Golden Globe. Butler hosted an episode of Saturday Night Live later that year.

In June 2023, Butler was invited to join the Academy of Motion Picture Arts and Sciences as an actor. The 50th Telluride Film Festival marked the premiere of Jeff Nichols's 1960s-set drama The Bikeriders, in which he played a member of a motorcycle club. The following year, he portrayed Gale Cleven in the war drama miniseries Masters of the Air. He next played the villainous Feyd-Rautha in Denis Villeneuve's science fiction epic Dune: Part Two (2024). Butler received praise for his commitment to the role, physical transformation, and complex character work.

Butler next starred as radical cult leader Vernon Jefferson Peak in Ari Aster's Western film Eddington, alongside Joaquin Phoenix, Emma Stone and Pedro Pascal, and in Darren Aronofsky's crime thriller Caught Stealing as Henry "Hank" Thompson, a bartender caught up in a web of crime, alongside Zoë Kravitz, Regina King, and Bad Bunny. In May 2025, It was announced that Butler would be joining Jeremy Allen White in A24's Henry Dunham Crime Pic Enemies.

In February 2026, it was announced that Butler would portray Lance Armstrong in Edward Berger's biopic about Armstrong. In April, he was cast alongside Michael B. Jordan in Miami Vice '85, where he'll be playing Sonny Crockett.

== Personal life ==
Butler enjoys creating and recording music. He taught himself to play guitar at the age of thirteen and piano at sixteen. In 2014, his mother died of duodenal cancer, which briefly made him consider retiring. From 2011 to 2019, Butler dated actress Vanessa Hudgens. In December 2021, he began dating actress and model Kaia Gerber. They broke up at the end of 2024.

== Filmography ==
=== Film ===
Key
†	Denotes films that have not yet been released

Year	Title	Role	Notes	
2009	Aliens in the Attic	Jake Pearson		
2011	Sharpay's Fabulous Adventure	Peyton Leverett	Direct-to-video	
2012	My Uncle Rafael	Cody Beck		
2015	The Intruders	Noah Henry		
2016	Yoga Hosers	Hunter Calloway		
2018	Dude	Thomas Daniels		
2019	The Dead Don't Die	Jack		
2019	Once Upon a Time in Hollywood	Tex Watson		
2022	Elvis	Elvis Presley		
2023	The Bikeriders	Benny		
2024	Dune: Part Two	Feyd-Rautha Harkonnen		
2025	Eddington	Vernon Jefferson Peak		
2025	Caught Stealing	Hank Thompson		
2028	Miami Vice '85 †	Sonny Crockett	Filming	
2028	RoboGobo: The Movie	Vincent the siamese cat	Voice role	In development
TBA	Enemies †		Post-production	

=== Television ===
Year	Title	Role	Notes
2005–2007	Ned's Declassified School Survival Guide	Lionel Scranton	Uncredited; 41 episodes
2005	Unfabulous	Student	Uncredited; episode: "The Eye Randy"
2006	Drake & Josh	Extra	Uncredited; episode: "The Demonator"
2006 / 2007	Hannah Montana	Toby / Derek Hanson	Episode: "Oops! I Meddled Again!" / Episode: "My Best Friend's Boyfriend"
2007 / 2008	Zoey 101	Danifer / James Garrett	Episode: "Quarantine" / Main role (season 4)
2007	iCarly	Jake Krandle	Episode: "iLike Jake"
2008	Out of Jimmy's Head	Lance	Episode: "Princess" (credited as Austin Robert Butler)
2009	Ruby & the Rockits	Jordan Gallagher	Main role
2009	Zeke and Luther	Rutger Murdock	Episode: "Adventure Boy"
2010	Wizards of Waverly Place	George	Episode: "Positive Alex"
2010	Jonas	Stone Stevens	2 episodes (credited as Austin Robert Butler)
2010	CSI: Miami	Josh Chapman	Episode: "Happy Birthday"
2010	The Defenders	Cody Dennis	Episode: "Nevada v. Dennis"
2010–2011	Life Unexpected	Jones Mager	10 episodes
2011	CSI: NY	Benjamin Gold	Episode: "Do or Die"
2011–2012	Switched at Birth	James "Wilkie" Wilkerson	14 episodes
2012	Are You There, Chelsea?	Luke	Episode: "Believe"
2013–2014	The Carrie Diaries	Sebastian Kydd	Main role
2014–2015	Arrow	Chase	3 episodes
2016–2017	The Shannara Chronicles	Wil Ohmsford	Main role
2022	Saturday Night Live	Himself (host)	Episode: "Austin Butler/Lizzo"
2024	Masters of the Air	Gale Cleven	Main role; miniseries

=== Theater ===
Year	Title	Role	Playwright	Venue	Ref.
2014	Death of the Author	Bradley	Steven Drukman	Geffen Playhouse, Los Angeles	
2018	The Iceman Cometh	Don Parritt	Eugene O'Neill	Bernard B. Jacobs Theatre, Broadway	

== Discography ==
- Elvis (Original Motion Picture Soundtrack) (2022)

== Awards and nominations ==
Year	Award	Category	Work	Result	Ref
2010	Young Artist Awards	Best Young Ensemble Cast in a Feature Film (Note: Shared with Megan Parker, Henri Young, Regan Young, and Carter Jenkins.)	Aliens in the Attic	Nominated	
2010	Young Artist Awards	Best Leading Young Actor in a TV Series (Comedy or Drama)	Ruby & The Rockits	Nominated	
2011	Young Artist Awards	Best Guest Starring Young Actor 18–21 in a TV Series	The Defenders	Nominated	
2019	Capri Hollywood International Film Festival	Best Ensemble Cast	Once Upon a Time in Hollywood	Won	
2020	Critics' Choice Movie Awards	Best Acting Ensemble	Once Upon a Time in Hollywood	Nominated	
2020	Screen Actors Guild Awards	Outstanding Cast in a Motion Picture	Once Upon a Time in Hollywood	Nominated	
2022	Atlanta Film Critics Circle	Best Breakthrough Performer	Elvis	Won	
2022	AACTA Awards	Best Lead Actor	Elvis	Won	
2022	Chicago Film Critics Association	Best Actor	Elvis	Nominated	
2022	Chicago Film Critics Association	Most Promising Performer	Elvis	Won	
2022	Dallas–Fort Worth Film Critics Association	Best Actor	Elvis	3rd place	
2022	Dublin Film Critics' Circle	Best Actor	Elvis	3rd place	
2022	Florida Film Critics Circle	Best Actor	Elvis	Nominated	
2022	Florida Film Critics Circle	Breakout Award	Elvis	Won	
2022	Greater Western New York Film Critics Association	Best Actor	Elvis	Nominated	
2022	Greater Western New York Film Critics Association	Breakthrough Performance	Elvis	Nominated	
2022	Indiana Film Journalists Association	Best Lead Performance	Elvis	Nominated	
2022	IndieWire Critics Poll	Best Performance	Elvis	10th place	
2022	Las Vegas Film Critics Society	Best Actor	Elvis	Nominated	
2022	New York Film Critics Online	Breakthrough Performance	Elvis	Won	
2022	North Texas Film Critics Association	Best Actor	Elvis	Nominated	
2022	Online Association of Female Film Critics	Best Male Lead	Elvis	Nominated	
2022	Online Association of Female Film Critics	Breakthrough Performance	Elvis	Won	
2022	People's Choice Awards	Drama Movie Star of 2022	Elvis	Won	
2022	Philadelphia Film Critics Circle	Best Breakthrough Performance	Elvis	Runner-up	
2022	Phoenix Critics Circle	Best Actor	Elvis	Nominated	
2022	Phoenix Film Critics Society	Breakthrough Performance	Elvis	Won	
2022	St. Louis Gateway Film Critics Association	Best Actor	Elvis	Nominated	
2022	Sunset Circle Awards	Best Actor	Elvis	Won	
2022	UK Film Critics Association	Actor of The Year	Elvis	Nominated	
2022	Utah Film Critics Association	Best Actor	Elvis	Runner-up	
2022	Washington D.C. Area Film Critics Association	Best Actor	Elvis	Nominated	
2023	AACTA International Awards	Best Actor	Elvis	Won	
2023	Academy Awards	Best Actor	Elvis	Nominated	
2023	Alliance of Women Film Journalists	Best Actor	Elvis	Nominated	
2023	Austin Film Critics Association	Best Actor	Elvis	Nominated	
2023	Austin Film Critics Association	Breakthrough Artist Award	Elvis	Nominated	
2023	British Academy Film Awards	Best Actor in a Leading Role	Elvis	Won	
2023	Chicago Indie Critics	Best Actor	Elvis	Nominated	
2023	Columbus Film Critics Association	Breakthrough Film Artist	Elvis	Runner-up	
2023	Critics Association of Central Florida	Best Actor	Elvis	Runner-up	
2023	Critics' Choice Movie Awards	Best Actor	Elvis	Nominated	
2023	Denver Film Critics Society	Best Actor	Elvis	Nominated	
2023	DiscussingFilm Critic Awards	Best Actor	Elvis	Nominated	
2023	Georgia Film Critics Association	Best Actor	Elvis	Nominated	
2023	Golden Globe Awards	Best Actor in a Motion Picture – Drama	Elvis	Won	
2023	Hawaii Film Critics Society	Best Actor	Elvis	Nominated	
2023	Hollywood Film Critics Association	Best Actor	Elvis	Nominated	
2023	Houston Film Critics Society	Best Actor	Elvis	Nominated	
2023	Irish Film & Television Awards	Best International Actor	Elvis	Won	
2023	Iowa Film Critics Association	Best Actor	Elvis	Runner-up	
2023	London Film Critics' Circle	Actor of the Year	Elvis	Nominated	
2023	Minnesota Film Critics Alliance	Best Actor	Elvis	Won	
2023	Music City Film Critics Association	Best Actor	Elvis	Nominated	
2023	North Carolina Film Critics Association	Best Actor	Elvis	Nominated	
2023	North Carolina Film Critics Association	Best Breakthrough Performance	Elvis	Won	
2023	North Dakota Film Society	Best Actor	Elvis	Nominated	
2023	Online Film Critics Society	Best Lead Actor	Elvis	Nominated	
2023	Palm Springs International Film Festival	Breakthrough Performance Award	Elvis	Won	
2023	Portland Critics Association	Best Actor	Elvis	Nominated	
2023	San Diego Film Critics Society	Best Actor	Elvis	Runner-up	
2023	San Diego Film Critics Society	Breakthrough Artist	Elvis	Won	
2023	San Francisco Bay Area Film Critics Circle	Best Actor	Elvis	Nominated	
2023	Satellite Awards	Best Actor – Comedy or Musical	Elvis	Won	
2023	Screen Actors Guild Awards	Outstanding Performance by a Male Actor in a Leading Role	Elvis	Nominated	
2023	Seattle Film Critics Society	Best Actor in a Leading Role	Elvis	Nominated	
2023	Vancouver Film Critics Circle	Best Actor	Elvis	Nominated	
2024	Kids' Choice Awards	Favorite Villain	Dune: Part Two	Nominated	
2024	Seattle Film Critics Society	Villain of the Year	Dune: Part Two	Nominated	
2025	Saturn Awards	Best Supporting Actor	Dune: Part Two	Nominated	

== See also ==
- List of actors with Academy Award nominations
- List of Golden Globe winners
