= Drukman =

Drukman is a surname. Notable people with the surname include:

- Haim Drukman (1932–2022), Israeli Orthodox rabbi and politician
- Steven Drukman, American playwright and journalist
