= Freedomland (play) =

1998 play by Amy Freed

- Genre: Comedy

Premiere
- Date: November 1997
- Place: South Coast Repertory

Freedomland is a 1998 comedy play written by Amy Freed. The plot revolves around the family reunion of the Underfingers gone wrong. It was finalist for the 1998 Pulitzer Prize for Drama.

Freedomland was produced Off-Broadway at Playwrights Horizons, running from December 16, 1998, to January 3, 1999. Directed by Howard Shalwitz, the cast featured Veanne Cox, Jeffrey Donovan, and Heather Goldenhersh. The "darkly satiric comedy" premiered at the South Coast Repertory, Costa Mesa, California, in November 1997. The title is based on the "name of a Wild West theme park in the Bronx, where Freed grew up."

== See also ==
- Freedomland U.S.A., the former Bronx theme park
