= Adam Bock =

Canadian playwright

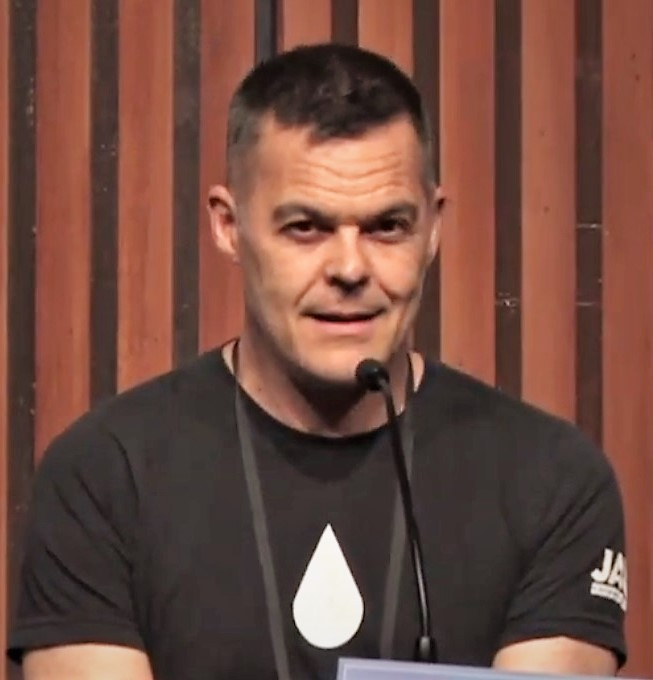
- Bock at the 2019 Pacific Playwrights Festival
- Born: November 5, 1961 (age 64); Montreal, Quebec, Canada
- Education: Brown University (MFA)
- Occupation: Playwright
- Height: 1.82 m (6 ft 0 in)
- Parents: Paul Bock (father); Judy Bock (mother)
- Awards: Obie Award for Playwriting "The Thugs" and Guggenheim Fellowship for Creative Arts, US & Canada

Adam Bock (born November 5, 1961) is a Canadian playwright currently living in the United States. He was born in Montreal, Quebec, Canada. In the fall of 1984, Bock studied at the National Theater Institute at The Eugene O'Neill Theater Center. He is an artistic associate of the Shotgun Players, an award-winning San Francisco theater group. His play Medea Eats was produced in 2000 by Clubbed Thumb, which subsequently premiered his play The Typographer's Dream in 2002. Five Flights was produced in New York City by the Rattlestick Playwrights Theater in 2004.

The Thugs opened Off-Off-Broadway in a production by SoHo Rep in October 2006, directed by Anne Kauffman. He won a 2006–2007 Obie award, Playwriting, for The Thugs.

During the 2007–2008 New York theatrical season, two plays by Bock were produced Off Broadway: The Receptionist at Manhattan Theatre Club in 2007 and The Drunken City, originally commissioned by the Kitchen Theatre Company in Ithaca, New York, at Playwrights Horizons.

Bock is openly gay and often writes about homosexuality. He is quoted as saying "I'm a gay playwright. I like being called a gay playwright. It's who I am. It's how I write. I have a very specific take on the world because I'm gay."

Bock has been nominated for two 2007–2008 Outer Critics Circle Awards. Both The Receptionist and The Drunken City were nominated for Outstanding Off-Broadway Play. In 2012, he won a John Simon Guggenheim Memorial Foundation Fellowship for his work.

Bock's play A Small Fire ran December 16, 2010 – January 23, 2011 Off-Broadway at Playwrights Horizons, under the direction of Trip Cullman. A Life premiered Off-Broadway at Playwrights Horizons on September 30, 2016 (previews), starring David Hyde Pierce and directed by Anne Kauffman. A Life was nominated for the 2017 Drama Desk Awards: Outstanding Play; David Hyde Pierce as Outstanding Actor in a Play; Anne Kauffman for Outstanding Director of a Play; Laura Jellinek for Outstanding Set Design for a Play; and Mikhail Fiksel for Outstanding Sound Design in a Play.

== Awards and honours ==
Year	Association	Category or Award	Project	Result	Ref.
2017	Drama Desk Awards	Outstanding Play	A Life	Nominated	
2012	John Simon Guggenheim Memorial Foundation	Guggenheim Fellowship - Creative Arts		Awarded	
2011	Drama Desk Awards	Outstanding Play	A Small Fire	Nominated	
2008	Broadway.com Audience Choice Awards	Favorite New Off-Broadway Play	The Receptionist	Won	
2008	Outer Critics Circle Awards	Outstanding New Off-Broadway Play	The Drunken City	Nominated	
2008	Outer Critics Circle Awards	Outstanding New Off-Broadway Play	The Receptionist	Nominated	
2008	William Inge Center for the Arts	Otis Guernsey New Voices in the American Theatre Award		Won	
2007	Obie Award	Playwriting	The Thugs	Won	
2006	GLAAD Media Awards	Outstanding New York Theatre: Broadway & Off-Broadway	Swimming in the Shallows	Nominated	
2006	National Ten-Minute Play Contest	Heideman Award	Three Guys and a Brenda	Won	
2005	Drama Desk Awards	Outstanding Musical	The Audience	Nominated	
2003	Theatre Bay Area	Will Glickman Award	Five Flights	Won	
2000	San Francisco Bay Area Theatre Critics Circle	Best Original Production	Swimming in the Shallows	Won	
2000	San Francisco Bay Area Theatre Critics Circle	Best Original Script	Swimming in the Shallows	Won	

== Theatrical works (productions) ==
=== Full-length plays ===
Year	Title	Theatre	Director	Cast	Notes	Ref.
2026	The Receptionist	Second Stage Theater	Sarah Benson	Katie Finneran, Mallori Johnson, Nael Nacer, Will Pullen	Off-Broadway Revival	
2009	The Receptionist	Evidence Room and Odyssey Theater	Bart DeLorenzo	Jennifer Finnigan, Chris L. McKenna, Megan Mullally, Jeff Perry	West Coast premiere	
2007	The Receptionist	Manhattan Theatre Club	Joe Mantello	Josh Charles, Robert Foxworth, Jayne Houdyshell, Kendra Kassebaum	World premiere	
2019	Before the Meeting	Williamstown Theater Festival	Trip Cullman	Cassie Beck, Kyle Beltran, Arnie Burton, Midori Francis, Deirdre O’Connell	World premiere	
2019	The Canadians	South Coast Repertory	Jaime Castañeda	Corey Brill, Daniel Chung, Corey Dorris, Linda Gehringer, Kyle T. Hester	World premiere	
2016	A Life	Playwrights Horizons	Anne Kauffman	Marinda Anderson, Brad Heberlee, David Hyde Pierce, Lynne McCollough, Nedra McClyde	World premiere	
2016	I Wasn't Going to Tell Anybody and then I Told Everybody	NYU Tisch School of the Arts	Lisa Peterson		World premiere	
2014	The Colby Sisters of Pittsburgh, Pennsylvania	Tricycle Theatre, now Kiln Theatre	Trip Cullman	Ronkẹ Adékoluẹjo, Isabella Calthorpe, Claire Forlani, Charlotte Parry, Patricia Potter, Alice Sanders	World premiere	
2011	A Small Fire	Playwrights Horizons	Trip Cullman	Reed Birney, Celia Keenan-Bolger, Michele Pawk, Victor Williams	World premiere	
2011	Phaedra	Shotgun Players	Rose Riordan	Patrick Alparone, Keith Burkland, Catherine Castellanos, Cindy Im, Trish Mulholland	World premiere	
2010	We Have Always Lived in the Castle	Yale Repertory Theater	Anne Kauffman	Jenn Gambatese, Alexandra Socha	Musical adaptation of the novel We Have Always Lived in the Castle by Shirley Jackson. Music by Todd Almond. Lyrics by Adam Bock and Todd Almond.	
2009	The Flowers	About Face Theatre	Trip Cullman	Caron Buinis, Brian-Mark Conover, Kieran Kredell, Merrina Millsapp, Bruch Reed, Ben Sprunger	World premiere	
2008	The Drunken City	Playwrights Horizons	Trip Cullman	Cassie Beck, Mike Colter, Maria Dizzia, Barrett Foa, Sue Jean Kim, Alfredo Narciso	New York City premiere	
2005	The Drunken City	Kitchen Theatre Company	Jesse Bush, Rachel Lampert	Alison Bacewicz, Brendan Farley, Karl Gregory, Kevin Rockower, Lauren Walsh Singerman, Erica Steinhagen	World premiere	
2007	The Shaker Chair	Humana Festival of New American Plays at the Actors Theatre of Louisville	Marc Masterson	Kathleen Butler, Brie Eley, Geraldine Librandi, Larry John Meyers, Sarah Peterson, Andy Prosky	World premiere	
2006	The Thugs	SoHo Rep	Anne Kauffman	Saidah Arrika Ekulona, Brad Heberlee, Carmen M. Herlihy, Chris Heuisler, Keira Keeley, Lynne McCullough, Maria Elena Ramirez, Mary Shultz	World premiere	
2005	The Audience	Transport Group Theatre Company	Jack Cummings III		World premiere. Musical. Conceived by Jack Cummings III and developed with Adam Bock.	
2005	Swimming in the Shallows	Second Stage Theater	Trip Cullman	Michael Arden, Rosemarie DeWitt, Murphy Guyer, Logan Marshall-Green, Susan Pourfar, Mary Shultz	New York City premiere	
1999	Swimming in the Shallows	Shotgun Players	Kent Nicholson	Katie Bales, Mary Eaton Fairfield, John Flanagan, Dawn-Elin Fraser, Gene Thompson, Liam Vincent	West Coast premiere	
2005	The Typographer's Dream	Encore Theatre Company	Anne Kauffman	Aimee Guillot, Jamie Jones, Michael Shipley	West Coast premiere	
2003	The Typographer's Dream	Bright Choice Productions, Edinburgh Festival Fringe	Owen Lewis	Kathryn Akin, Kenneth Avery-Clark, Nicola Redmond	European premiere	
2002	The Typographer's Dream	Clubbed Thumb	Drew Barr	Kate Hampton, Meg MacCary, Dan Snook	World premiere	
2004	Five Flights	Rattlestick Theater, Encore Theatre Company	Kent Nicholson	Jason Butler Harner, Kevin Karrick, Matthew Montelongo, Alice Ripley, Lisa Steindler, Sara Surrey	Off-Broadway premiere	
2002	Five Flights	Encore Theatre Company	Kent Nicholson	Dawn-Elin Fraser, Kevin Karrick, Alexis Lezin, Craig Neibaur, Lisa Steindler, Liam Vincent	World premiere	
2003	Thursday	Encore Theatre Company	Kent Nicholson	Cassie Beck, Chloe Broznan, Jibz Cameron, Jason Frazier, Robert Martinez, Craig Neibaur, David Ryan Smith, Lisa Steindler	World premiere	
2002	A Fairy's Tale	Shotgun Players	Patrick Dooley		World premiere	
2000	Medea Eats	Clubbed Thumb	Pam MacKinnon	Gary Brownlee, Lars Hanson, Seth Herzog, Gretchen Lee Krich, Meg MacCary, Rizwan Manji, Kimberly Ross, Maria Striar, John Wellmann, Mather Zickel	World premiere	
1995	A Roadside Garden	Nora Theater	Eric Engel	Mimi Huntington, Faith Justice, Jim O’Brien, Jacqui Parker, Liam Sullivan		
1990	Percy Stripped Down	Miranda Theatre Company	Diego Taborda	Peggy Flood, Martha MaCallum, Matthew Mutrie		

=== Short Plays ===
Year	Title	Theatre	Director	Cast	Notes	Ref.
2012	Love is a Many Splendored Thing	The 24 Hour Plays on Broadway	Andy Fickman	Jason Biggs, Rachel Dratch, America Ferrera, Eddie Kaye Thomas	World premiere	
2008	The Song of the Falling Man	The 24 Hour Musicals	Jonathan Butterell	Victoria Clark, John Ellison Conlee, Cheyenne Jackson, Claudia Shear	Musical. Music by Todd Almond. Lyrics by Todd Almond and Adam Bock. Book by Adam Bock.	
2008	Why I Love Camping	The 24 Hour Plays on Broadway	Ari Edelson	Rachel Dratch, Jennifer Esposito, Matthew Settle, Ben Shenkman	World premiere	
2006	Three Girls and a Bob	The 24 Hour Plays on Broadway	Elinor Renfield	Jennifer Aniston, David Cross, Rosie Perez, Lynn Whitfield	World premiere	
2006	Three Guys and a Brenda	The 24 Hour Company at Atlantic Theater Company	Garrett Savage	Julie Shavers, Carla Rzeszewski, Jama Williamson, Tami Dixon	New York City premiere	
2004	Three Guys and a Brenda	Humana Festival of New American Plays at the Actors Theatre of Louisville	Steven Rahe	Suzanna Hay, Keira Keeley, Cheryl Lynn Bowers, Sarah Augusta	World premiere	
2005	The Windows	The 24 Hour Plays on Broadway	Hal Brooks	Anthony Mackie, Andre Royo, Ben Shenkman, Alan Tudyk	World premiere	
2004	Three Movers	The 24 Hour Company at Atlantic Theater Company	Carl Forsman	Saidah Arrika Ekulona, Matthew Dawson, Dan O’Brian	World premiere	

== Bibliography ==
- A Life. New York: Concord Theatricals. 2017. ISBN 978-0-5737-0612-7.
- The Colby Sisters of Pittsburgh Pennsylvania. London: Bloomsbury Methuen Drama. 2014. ISBN 978-1-4725-9847-9.
- A Small Fire. New York: Samuel French. 2012. ISBN 978-0-5737-0003-3.
- The Office Plays: The Receptionist & The Thugs. New York: Samuel French. 2008. ISBN 978-0-5736-6027-6.
- The Drunken City. New York: Samuel French. 2008. ISBN 978-0-5736-6288-1.
- Five Flights. New York: Playscripts. 2006. ISBN 978-1-6238-4180-5.
- Swimming in the Shallows. New York: Playscripts. 2005. ISBN 978-1-6238-4067-9.
- “The Typographer’s Dream.” Funny, Strange, and Provocative: seven plays from Clubbed Thumb, edited by Maria Striar and Erin Detrick. New York: Playscripts, Inc. 2008. ISBN 978-0-9709-0462-1.
