= Collected Stories (play) =

1996 play written by Donald Margulies

- Original language: English
- Written by: Donald Margulies

Premiere
- Date: 1996
- Place: South Coast Repertory; Costa Mesa, California

Collected Stories is a play by Donald Margulies which premiered at South Coast Repertory in 1996, and was presented on Broadway in 2010. The play was a Pulitzer Prize finalist in 1997.

== Plot summary ==
Ruth Steiner is a teacher and respected short story writer. Her student and protégée is Lisa Morrison. Over the course of six years, Lisa journeys from insecure student to successful writer. After publishing a well-received collection of short stories, Lisa writes a novel based on Ruth's affair with the poet Delmore Schwartz. The women deal with the moral dilemma of whether a person's life events are suitable for another to use in their own creative process.

Although Delmore Schwartz was a real-life poet and short-story writer, the characters of "Ruth Steiner" and "Lisa" are both entirely fictional. Margulies, who teaches playwrighting at Yale University, knows that "mentors and protégés exist everywhere."

Collected Stories was inspired by the literary scandal revealed through Stephen Spender's now-famous letter to The New York Times (Sept. 4, 1994), in which he accused American novelist, David Leavitt, of plagiarizing Stephen’s 1951 novel World Within World, especially its “literary structure, character development, dialogue and plot” in his 1993 novel, While England Sleeps.

== Production history ==
The play was commissioned and premiered by South Coast Repertory, Costa Mesa, California in October 1996, directed by Lisa Peterson. The cast starred Kandis Chappell as Ruth Steiner and Suzanne Cryer as Lisa Morrison. The production won the Los Angeles Drama Critics Circle Award for Best Production of a Play and Best Original Play. The play was a Pulitzer Prize finalist (shortlisted in April 1997).

The Manhattan Theatre Club presented the play Off-Broadway at Manhattan Theatre Club Stage I, from May 20, 1997 through July 27, 1997. That production, again directed by Peterson, starred Debra Messing as Lisa Morrison and Maria Tucci as Ruth Steiner. It received the Drama Desk Award nomination for Best Play, and was a finalist for the Dramatists Guild/Hull-Warriner Award for Best Play. It was then produced at the Off-Broadway Lucille Lortel Theatre, running for 232 performances, from August 13, 1998 through February 29, 1999. Directed by William Carden, the cast starred Uta Hagen as Ruth and Lorca Simons as Lisa.

It was produced in Los Angeles at the Geffen Playhouse, Westwood in May 1999, with direction by Gil Cates and starring Linda Lavin as Ruth and Samantha Mathis as Lisa. It received the Los Angeles Ovation Award for Best Production of a Play.

The West End premiere opened in November 1999 and closed February 5, 2000 at the Theatre Royal Haymarket with Helen Mirren as Ruth and Anne-Marie Duff as Lisa and directed by Howard Davies.

It was produced by Shakespeare and Company, Lenox, Massachusetts from July 14, 2001 through August 2, 2001, with Annette Miller and Christianna Nelson. A film ran on PBS "Hollywood Presents: Collected Stories", premiering on January 16, 2002, starring Linda Lavin and Samantha Mathis.

The play premiered on Broadway in a limited engagement production by the Manhattan Theatre Club with previews starting April 9, 2010, opening April 28, 2010, through June 2010. This production starred Linda Lavin and Sarah Paulson, with direction by Lynn Meadow, scenic design by Santo Loquasto, costume design by Jane Greenwood, and lighting design by Natasha Katz.

In February 2013, Music Makers Productions produced a site-specific version of the show at the Strand Bookstore's Rare Books Room, starring Lisa Fernandez and Renée Petrofes.

== Response ==
Ben Brantley in his New York Times review of the 1998 production, wrote "... the emotional current between the performers takes on a sweeping, electric life of its own. You find yourself paying less attention to the dialogue than to the finely graded code of gestures and vocal inflections with which these women chart the rise and fall of a friendship ... you may be hard pressed after the play ends to remember anything specific that Ms. Hagen's character has said. But you won't forget the blend of pride and vulnerability that infuses her every moment onstage. You'll remember the way she holds her head back to keep the tears from rolling off her face ... and, above all, the elegiac poetry, equal parts defeatedness and hope, that Ms. Hagen brings to the basic act of bolting and unbolting a door in the play's final scene."

== Awards and nominations ==
=== Original Off-Broadway production ===
Year	Award	Category	Nominee	Result
1997	Pulitzer Prize	Drama	Donald Margulies	Finalist

=== Original West End production ===
Year	Award	Category	Nominee	Result
2000	Laurence Olivier Awards	Best Actress in a Supporting Role	Anne-Marie Duff	Nominated
2000	Laurence Olivier Awards	Best Lighting Design	Peter Mumford	Nominated

=== Original Broadway production ===
Year	Award	Category	Nominee	Result
2010	Tony Award	Best Actress in a Play	Linda Lavin	Nominated
