= Kenneth Lin (playwright) =

American playwright and screenwriter (born 1978)

- Born: 1978 (age 47–48); New York City, New York, U.S.
- Education: Cornell University (BA); Yale University (MFA)
- Occupations: Playwright, Screenwriter
- Spouse: Rebecca Sawyer
- Writing career
- Language: English, Mandarin
- Notable works: House of Cards, The Warrior
- Website: Official website

Kenneth Lin (born 1978) is an American playwright and screenwriter.

== Early life and education ==
Lin was born in the Bronx, New York to parents of Chinese descent and grew up on Long Island, New York.

Lin was born into a Chinese-American family. Lin attended Cornell University and the Yale School of Drama. He is an alumnus of the Fulbright Program and was selected as one of the Dramatists Guild's "50 to Watch" list in 2007. In 2013, Lin joined the writing staff for the second and third seasons of the Netflix series House of Cards.

== Personal life ==
Kenneth Lin and Rebecca Ruth Sawyer married in Riverhead, New York. She graduated from the University of Connecticut and has two master’s degrees: one in East Asian studies from Yale and another in social work from New York University.

== Career ==
=== Film and Television work ===
Warrior (TV Series) 2019

- (written by - 2 episodes)

Sweetbitter (TV Series) (2018)

- (consulting producer - 6 episodes)
- (written for television by - 1 episode)

House of Cards (TV Series) (2014-2017)

- (co-producer - 13 episodes, 2016) (supervising producer - 1 episode, 2017)
- (staff writer - 6 episodes, 2014) (written by - 5 episodes, 2014 - 2017)
- (story editor - 13 episodes-2015)

Stronger (Short) (2016)

- (executive producer)

My America (2014)

- (written by - segment "'John'") (2014)

Avatar Aang: The Last Airbender (2026)

- (story by)

=== Theatre work ===
said Saïd (2007) The play received the L. Arnold Weissberger Award, presented annually by The Williamstown Theatre Festival (WTF), on behalf of the Anna L. Weissberger Foundation. Lin received a $10,000 prize and publication of his script by Samuel French, Inc. It also was awarded the Princess Grace Award: Playwriting Fellowship.

The play had its world premiere at the Alliance Theatre and had its West Coast Premiere in 2008.

Po Boy Tango (2007) South Coast Repertory Pacific Playwrights Festival, world premiere Northlight Theatre Company.

Intelligence-Slave (2010) World premiere, Alley Theatre.

Fallow World premiere, People's Light and Theatre Company.

Warrior Class (2012) World premiere (off-Broadway), Second Stage Theater.

Pancakes, Pancakes! (2016) Ran at the Alliance Theatre Atlanta, Georgia between May 31 - July 10, 2016.

Adventures of Huckleberry Finn (2017) Premiered at Alley Theatre Houston in February 2017.

Kleptocracy (2019) Performed 2019 at the Arena Stage, Washington, D.C.

Exclusion (2023) First performed May 5 through June 25, 2023, at the Arena Stage, Washington, D.C.

Future projects

- Life on Paper (2020): Jackalope Theatre Company, Chicago, Illinois
- Genius in Love
- About Me
- Agency
- Farewell My Concubine

== Awards and honors ==
- Kendeda Graduate Playwriting Competition (said Saïd)
- Princess Grace Award (said Saïd)
- L. Arnold Weissberger Award
- Cole Porter Prize (said Saïd)
- Edgerton New Play Prize (Po Boy Tango)
- Fulbright Scholarship

== See also ==
- Kleptocracy
- Russia under Vladimir Putin
