= Donald Margulies =

American playwright

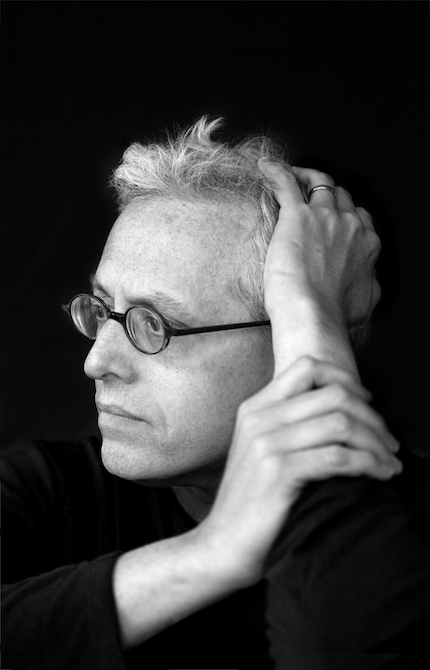
- Born: September 2, 1954 (age 72); Brooklyn, New York, U.S.
- Education: State University of New York, Purchase (BFA)
- Occupations: Playwright screenwriter academic
- Spouse: Lynn Street

Donald Margulies (born September 2, 1954) is an American playwright and academic. In 2000, he won the Pulitzer Prize for Drama for his play Dinner with Friends.

== Background and education ==
Margulies attended John Dewey High School in Brooklyn, New York, and graduated from Purchase College where he received a BFA in Visual Arts. Margulies lives with his wife, Lynn Street, a physician, and their son, Miles, in New Haven, Connecticut.

He is a professor in the Practice of English and Theatre & Performance Studies at Yale University.

== Theater ==
Margulies' notable works include The Country House (2014), Time Stands Still (2009) and Brooklyn Boy (2004). Sight Unseen and Collected Stories were finalists for the Pulitzer Prize for Drama, in 1992, and 1997, respectively; Dinner with Friends was awarded the Pulitzer Prize in 2000.

Margulies said of Sight Unseen, "It's about loss, like most of my plays, and about identity." Ben Brantley noted themes in his works: "The central motifs in Brooklyn Boy have always been visible in Mr. Margulies's work, from the willed amnesia of the self-invented artist (Sight Unseen) to the hazy lines between fiction and reality (Collected Stories). And Eric's fractious, divided family, summoned in recollection in Brooklyn Boy, has been anticipated in The Loman Family Picnic and What's Wrong With This Picture?

=== Long Lost ===
The play was developed in connection with the Nashville Repertory Theatre Ingram New Works Festival. The unfinished play was given a reading in May 2015 at the Festival. The play focuses on a "long-overdue reunion between two middle-aged brothers." Long Lost opened Off-Broadway, produced by the Manhattan Theatre Club, at New York City Center — Stage I on May 14, 2019, in previews, officially on June 4. Directed by Daniel J. Sullivan, the cast features Kelly AuCoin, Annie Parisse, Lee Tergesen and Alex Wolff.

=== The Country House ===
The play takes place in the Berkshires, where Anna, an actress, is appearing at the Williamstown Theatre Festival. She is entertaining her son, a failed actor, Elliot; a handsome famous actor, Michael; her son-in-law, Walter, who was married to her deceased daughter, and his girlfriend/fiancé, Nell and his daughter Susie.

The Country House opened on Broadway on October 2, 2014, at the Manhattan Theater Club's Samuel J. Friedman Theatre. It was a co-production with the Geffen Playhouse, where it had its world premiere on June 11, 2014, directed by Daniel Sullivan and starred Blythe Danner ("Anna"), Eric Lange, David Rasche and Sarah Steele; Scott Foley and Emily Swallow originated roles played on Broadway by Daniel Sunjata and Kate Jennings Grant. It won the 2014 L.A. Ovation Award for Best Play (Large Theatre) and was selected an Applause Books Best Play of 2013–14.

=== Time Stands Still ===
Time Stands Still opened on Broadway on January 28, 2010, at the Manhattan Theatre Club's Friedman Theatre for a limited engagement. It resumed performances on September 23, 2010, at the Cort Theatre, where it ran until January 30, 2011; between its two runs, it played a total of 24 previews and 193 performances. It starred Laura Linney, Brian d'Arcy James, Eric Bogosian and Alicia Silverstone (later succeeded at the Cort by Christina Ricci), and was directed by Daniel Sullivan. The play was nominated for a 2010 Tony Award for Best Play and was a Burns Mantle Best Play of 2009–2010. Linney was nominated for a Tony Award for Best Actress in a Play.

Time Stands Still had its world premiere at the Geffen Playhouse (Los Angeles) in February 2009 which had commissioned it. Directed by Sullivan, the Geffen premiere featured Silverstone, Anna Gunn, David Harbour and Robin Thomas. Its European premiere took place in Stockholm in 2009.

=== Shipwrecked! An Entertainment ===
The play, set in the 19th Century, focuses on "Louis de Rougemont" who was shipwrecked on a Coral Sea Island and lived with Australian aborigines, or so he tells his listeners in England.

The play made its world premiere in the September 2007 Pacific Playwrights Festival at South Coast Repertory, where it starred Gregory Itzin and was directed by Bart DeLorenzo. The play went on to productions at the Geffen Playhouse, where it again was directed by DeLorenzo and starred Itzin and Long Wharf Theatre in New Haven, directed by Evan Cabnet in February 2008.

The play opened Off-Broadway at Primary Stages, directed by Lisa Peterson, running from February 8, 2009, to March 7, 2009. Michael Countryman appeared in the Long Wharf and Off-Broadway productions. It received the 2009 Outer Critics' Circle Award nomination for Outstanding New Play.

Oil Lamp Theater in Glenview, IL off-Chicago produced Shipwrecked: An Entertainment in summer 2021, which was the first production of the theater company to be produced outdoors.

=== Brooklyn Boy ===
Brooklyn Boy began at the Pacific Playwrights Festival, in 2003, and was produced at South Coast Repertory in 2004, on Broadway by Manhattan Theatre Club at the Biltmore Theatre in February 2005, and in Paris at the Comedie des Champs-Élysées. It was an American Theatre Critics' Association New Play Award finalist, a 2005 Outer Critics' Circle nominee for Outstanding New Broadway Play and a Burns Mantle Best Play of 2004–2005.

The play was directed by Daniel Sullivan, and its original cast at the South Coast Rep was Adam Arkin, Arye Gross, Allan Miller, Ari Graynor, Mimi Lieber, Kevin Isola and Dana Reeve (whose role was played on Broadway by Polly Draper).

=== Dinner with Friends ===
Dinner with Friends, which received the 2000 Pulitzer Prize for Drama, was commissioned by Actors Theatre of Louisville (Kentucky), where it had its world premiere at the 1998 Humana Festival of New American Plays. A revised version was produced in October 1998 at South Coast Repertory in Costa Mesa, California.

The play opened Off-Broadway at the Variety Arts Theatre in November 1999, where it played 654 performances. In addition to the Pulitzer, Dinner with Friends received an American Theatre Critics Association New Play Citation, The Dramatists' Guild/Hull-Warriner Award, the Lucille Lortel Award for Outstanding Off-Broadway Play, the Outer Critics Circle Award for Outstanding Off-Broadway Play a Drama Desk Award nomination for Best Play and was selected a Burns Mantle Best Play of 1999–2000.

It went on to have a long run in Paris at the Comedie des Champs-Élysées, and productions in London, Berlin, Vienna, Stockholm, Tokyo, Mumbai, Seoul, Tel Aviv and Istanbul.

In 2002 it was an Emmy Award-nominated film for HBO.

=== Collected Stories ===
Collected Stories was commissioned by South Coast Repertory, where it had its world premiere in 1996. It went on to have three New York productions: its premiere Off-Broadway at Manhattan Theatre Club's City Center Stage I, in 1997, with Maria Tucci and Debra Messing, directed by Lisa Peterson; in 1998–99 at the Lucille Lortel Theatre with Uta Hagen and Lorca Simons, directed by William Carden; and on Broadway in 2010 at Manhattan Theatre Club's Friedman (formerly Biltmore) Theatre, starring Linda Lavin and Sarah Paulson, directed by Lynne Meadow. Lavin received a 2010 Tony Award nomination for Best Actress in a Play for her performance.

Lavin had previously played the role of Ruth Steiner in May - June 1999 at the Geffen Playhouse in a production co-starring Samantha Mathis, directed by Gilbert Cates, which was later re-produced for television broadcast by PBS Hollywood Presents in 2002.

The play has had many productions all over the country and around the world, including one in London in 1999, at the Theatre Royal Haymarket, with Helen Mirren and Anne-Marie Duff, directed by Howard Davies.

Collected Stories was a finalist for the 1997 Pulitzer Prize for Drama.

=== Sight Unseen ===
Sight Unseen was commissioned by South Coast Repertory, where it had its premiere in September 1991. The play premiered Off-Broadway in a Manhattan Theatre Club production, at City Center II on January 7, 1992, and transferred to the Orpheum Theatre on March 26, 1992, where it ran for a combined total of 293 performances. It was directed by Michael Bloom and starred Dennis Boutsikaris, Deborah Hedwall, Jon DeVries and, in the supporting role of a German art critic, Laura Linney.

Linney played "Patricia" in the play's Broadway premiere at Manhattan Theatre Club's Biltmore Theatre, running from May 6, 2004 (previews) to July 25, 2004. The cast featured Ben Shenkman, Byron Jennings and Ana Reeder, directed by Daniel Sullivan. Linney received a Tony Award nomination for Best Actress in a Play.

The play was a finalist for the 1992 Pulitzer Prize for Drama.

=== The Loman Family Picnic ===
The Loman Family Picnic was first produced by Manhattan Theatre Club (MTC) at City Center Stage II, from June 6, 1989, to July 2, 1989, with Marcia Jean Kurtz and Larry Block, directed by Barnet Kellman. The MTC revival ran from October 28, 1993, to January 9, 1994, at New York City Center Stage I. Directed by Lynne Meadow, the cast featured Christine Baranski and Peter Friedman, The play was nominated for the 1994-95 Drama Desk Award, Best Revival of a Play and was a Burns Mantle Best Play of 1988–1989.

=== The Model Apartment ===
Lola and Max are in their 60s and are Holocaust survivors. They have moved from Brooklyn to a condominium in Florida. Debby is their overweight and messy daughter, late 30s. Neil is 15, a black young man who is Debby's boyfriend.

The Model Apartment premiered at Los Angeles Theatre Center in November 1988, directed by Roberta Levitow featuring Chloe Webb as "Debby", Milton Selzer and Erica Yohn as her parents and Zero Hubbard.

The play opened Off-Broadway at Primary Stages, running from October 11, 1995, to November 12, 1995. Directed by Lisa Peterson, the cast featured Lynn Cohen (Lola), Akili Prince, Paul Stolarsky and Roberta Wallach. Margulies won the 1995-96 OBIE Award for Playwriting, and the play was a 1995-96 Drama Desk nominee for Best Play and a Dramatists' Guild/Hull-Warriner Award finalist.

The play was revived Off-Broadway by Primary Stages, from September 24, 2013 (previews), officially on October 15. Directed by Evan Cabnet, the cast featured Mark Blum, Diane Davis and Kathryn Grody. It was nominated for two Lucille Lortel Awards (Outstanding Lead Actress in a Play, Diane Davis and Outstanding Revival) and for two 2014 Drama Desk Awards (Outstanding Revival of a Play and Outstanding Featured Actress in a Play, Diane Davis).

=== What's Wrong with This Picture? ===
Shirley, a Jewish housewife and mother from Brooklyn, returns from the dead to reconcile with her family. Her husband Mort is grieving and teen son Artie can't forgive her for leaving him.

What's Wrong with This Picture? was first produced Off-Broadway by the Manhattan Theatre Club Stage 73, from January 29, 1985, to February 23, 1985, directed by Claudia Weill and starring Madeline Kahn as Shirley. It was next produced Off-Broadway by the Jewish Repertory Theatre from June 9, 1990, to August 5, 1990, directed by Larry Arrick.

The play ran on Broadway at the Brooks Atkinson Theatre from November 15, 1994, in previews, officially on December 8, 1994, and closed on December 18, 1994. Directed by Joe Mantello, the cast featured Faith Prince, Alan Rosenberg, Jerry Stiller, and David Moscow.

=== Found a Peanut ===
Found a Peanut was first produced by Joseph Papp at the New York Shakespeare Festival in June 1984, where it was directed by Claudia Weill and starred Robert Joy, Evan Handler, Peter McNicol, Greg Germann, Robin Bartlett, Nealla Spano, Kevin Geer and Jonathan Walker.

=== Gifted Children ===
Gifted Children was produced by the Jewish Repertory Theater (New York City) in December 1983, directed by Joan Vail Thorne and starring Dinah Manoff and Zohra Lampert.

=== Adaptations ===
Luna Park is a one-act play inspired by the short story "In Dreams Begin Responsibilities" by Delmore Schwartz and was his New York debut as a playwright. The play was commissioned by the Jewish Repertory Theater which produced the play in February 1982 with direction by Florence Stanley.

His play God of Vengeance, based on the Yiddish classic by Sholem Asch, was produced at ACT Theatre (Seattle) in April 2000, and in August 2002 at the Williamstown Theatre Festival, directed by Gordon Edelstein and starring Ron Leibman.

Coney Island Christmas, adapted from the short story “The Loudest Voice” by Grace Paley, was commissioned and first produced by the Geffen Playhouse in November 2012. Directed by Bart DeLorenzo the cast featured Arye Gross and Isabella Acres in this "Jewish Christmas show".

== Film and television ==
Margulies has written pilots and episodes of several television shows. In the 1980s, he was under contract to Norman Lear's company to develop television pilots, and was a producer-writer for the television series Baby Boom.

He has adapted a wide range of material for film and television, both fiction (including Middlesex by Jeffrey Eugenides, Tom Wolfe’s A Man in Full, The Touchstone by Edith Wharton) and non-fiction (notably American Lion: Andrew Jackson in the White House by Jon Meacham, The Most Dangerous Book: The Battle for James Joyce’s “Ulysses" by Kevin Birmingham, and biographies of David O. Selznick, Robert Capa and Keith Moon), all of which are unproduced.

=== The End of the Tour ===
Margulies adapted the memoir Although of Course You End Up Becoming Yourself: A Road Trip With David Foster Wallace, by David Lipsky, as a feature film screenplay, The End of the Tour. The film, released in 2015, was directed by James Ponsoldt and stars Jason Segel as Wallace and Jesse Eisenberg as Lipsky. The film received widespread positive reviews from critics, with a 92% rating on Rotten Tomatoes.

== Grants and Fellowships ==
Margulies has received grants from the National Endowment for the Arts, the New York Foundation for the Arts, the John Simon Guggenheim Memorial Foundation and a MacDowell Colony Fellowship.

He was playwright-in-residence at the Sundance Playwrights Conference for three summers; Collected Stories was developed there, as was an early version of Sight Unseen.

Margulies is an alumnus of New Dramatists and serves on the council of the Dramatists Guild of America.

== Selected Honors ==
- 2019 American Academy of Arts and Sciences inductee
- 2018 Thornton Wilder Prize
- 2015 William Inge Theatre Festival Distinguished Achievement in American Theater Award
- 2014 PEN/Laura Pels International Foundation for Theater Award American Playwright in Mid-Career
- 2005 American Academy of Arts and Letters Award in Literature
- 2005 National Foundation for Jewish Culture Award in Literary Arts
- 2000 Madge Evans-Sidney Kingsley Award for Outstanding Achievement in the Theatre by a Playwright
- 2000 Pulitzer Prize for Drama

== Notable works ==
- Luna Park, 1982
- Resting Place, 1982
- Gifted Children, 1983
- Found a Peanut, 1984
- What's Wrong with This Picture?, 1985
- The Model Apartment, 1988
- The Loman Family Picnic, 1989
- Pitching to the Star, 1990
- Sight Unseen, 1991
- July 7, 1994, 1995
- Collected Stories, 1996
- Dinner with Friends, 1998
- God of Vengeance, 2000
- Brooklyn Boy, 2003
- Shipwrecked! An Entertainment, 2007
- Time Stands Still, 2009
- Coney Island Christmas, 2012
- The Country House, 2014
- Long Lost, 2019
- Lunar Eclipse, 2023
