= Bart DeLorenzo =

American musician

Bart DeLorenzo is a Los Angeles-based theater director and producer. He is the founding artistic director of the Evidence Room theater, a contemporary theater productions company.

He has directed many local and world premieres at the Evidence Room including David Greenspan’s She Stoops to Comedy, David Edgar’s Pentecost, Kelly Stuart’s Mayhem (starring Megan Mullally) and Homewrecker, Gordon Dahlquist’s Delirium Palace and Messalina, John Olive’s Killers, Philip K. Dick’s Flow My Tears, The Policeman Said, Naomi Wallace’s One Flea Spare, Charles L. Mee’s The Imperialists at the Club Cave Canem, Robert David MacDonald’s No Orchids for Miss Blandish, Keith Reddin’s Almost Blue, and Harry Kondoleon’s The Houseguests. He has also directed his own adaptation of Charles Dickens's Hard Times, Anton Chekhov's The Cherry Orchard, Friedrich Schiller's Don Carlos (as adapted by John Rafter Lee), and Edward Bond’s Saved and Early Morning.

== Career ==
At the Evidence Room theater, he also produced award-winning productions of Thornton Wilder's The Skin of Our Teeth, Charles L. Mee's The Berlin Circle, and Robert Prior's Speed-Hedda,. He has participated in the development of new plays at South Coast Repertory’s Pacific Playwrights Festival, the Mark Taper Forum’s New Work Festival, A.S.K. Theater Projects, the Ojai Playwrights Conference, Madison Repertory, and the California Institute of the Arts.

In 2006, he directed the Center Theatre Group’s kick-off premiere event of Suzan-Lori Parks’ 365 Days/365 Plays outdoors at the Los Angeles Music Center plaza and on the steps of Walt Disney Concert Hall. In 2005-2007, he directed the world premiere of Sandra Tsing Loh’s long-running Mother on Fire at the 24th Street Theater, and subsequent revivals at the Pasadena Playhouse, the Sundance Film Festival, and the Women’s Building in San Francisco. In 2007, he directed the world premiere of Donald Margulies' Shipwrecked! An Entertainment starring Gregory Itzin at South Coast Repertory, which was later revived at the Geffen Playhouse. In 2008, he directed the world premiere of Joan Rivers: A Work in Progress by a Life in Progress at the Geffen Playhouse and the west coast premiere of Sarah Ruhl's Dead Man's Cell Phone at South Coast Repertory. In 2009, he directed Mark Brown's adaptation of Around the World in 80 Days at the Cleveland Play House, the world premiere of Michael Sargent's The Projectionist (starring Hamish Linklater) at the Kirk Douglas Theatre, the world premiere of Justin Tanner's Voice Lessons (starring Laurie Metcalf) at the Zephyr Theater, Caryl Churchill's A Number (starring John Heard) at the Odyssey Theater, and Adam Bock's The Receptionist (starring Megan Mullally). In 2010, he directed Charles L. Mee's "bobrauschenbergamerica" for TheSpyAnts Theatre Company at [Inside] The Ford.

In 2010, he directed King Lear for the Antaeus Company. This production won the L.A. Drama Critics Circle Award for production and direction. In 2011, he directed Margo Veil for the Odyssey Theatre Ensemble and Evidence Room. This production won the L.A. Drama Critics Circle Award for production and direction.

== Personal life ==
He is a graduate of Phillips Exeter Academy, Yale University and the American Repertory Theater’s Institute for Advanced Theater Training at Harvard University.

== Awards ==
He has received six LA Weekly Theater Awards for Direction and Production and three Backstage Garlands for Production, Adaptation, and ‘Local Hero’ Director and three L.A. Drama Critics Circle Awards. He received the 2012 Theatre Communications Group Alan Schneider Award for Directing.
