= Amy Freed =

American playwright

- Born: 1958 (age 67–68); Manhattan, New York, U.S.
- Education: Southern Methodist University (BFA); American Conservatory Theater (MFA)
- Occupation: Playwright
- Spouse: Mick LaSalle

Amy Freed (born 1958) is an American playwright. Her play Freedomland was a finalist for the 1998 Pulitzer Prize for Drama.

== Biography ==
=== Early life ===
Freed was born in Manhattan and grew up in The Bronx, Pittsburgh, Chicago, and Westchester County, New York. Her father, Richard (1927-2015) was an architect. Her mother was the actor, acting teacher and director Margaret Loft (1925-2024).

She earned a degree in acting at Southern Methodist University. She spent several years in New York and then attended the American Conservatory Theater (ACT) in San Francisco, receiving an M.F.A. While at ACT she wrote a play rather than a thesis for her degree. That play, Still Warm, is loosely based on the TV newswoman Jessica Savitch, and "became a precocious playwriting debut when it was produced at the Climate Theatre in 1991."

=== Career ===
Freed was nominated as a finalist in the drama category of the 1998 Pulitzer Prizes for her play Freedomland.Freedomland was produced Off-Broadway at Playwrights Horizons, running from December 16, 1998 to January 3, 1999. Directed by Howard Shalwitz, the cast featured Veanne Cox, Jeffrey Donovan, and Heather Goldenhersh. The "darkly satiric comedy" premiered at the South Coast Repertory, Costa Mesa, California, in November 1997. The title is based on the "name of a Wild West theme park in the Bronx, where Freed grew up."

Her play The Psychic Life of Savages won the New York Arts Club's $10,000 Joseph Kesselring Award. The play ran at Woolly Mammoth in Washington, D. C. opening in April 1995. Lloyd Rose, reviewing for The Washington Post, called the play an "exultantly mean, painfully affecting comedy." That production won a 1995 Charles McArthur Award for outstanding new play. The play also ran at the Wilma Theater, Philadelphia in May 1998. Regarding this play, Freed "calls herself, 'an examiner of pathologies.'"

She wrote The Beard of Avon which was commissioned and premiered by South Coast Repertory, opening in May 2001. The play was produced Off-Broadway by the New York Theatre Workshop, running from November 18, 2003 to December 21, 2003. Directed by Doug Hughes, the cast included Tim Blake Nelson as Wiliam Shakspere [sic], Mark Harelik as Edward De Vere, Mary Louise Wilson as Queen Elizabeth and Kate Jennings Grant as Anne Hathaway.

Her play Safe in Hell, another South Coast Repertory commission, received its premiere production in April 2004. The play received its East Coast premiere at the Yale Repertory Theatre in November 2005. The play is "the story of real-life father and son Puritan preachers Cotton and Increase Mather. The comedy delves into the story behind the witch hunt."

You, Nero premiered at South Coast Repertory in 2009 and focuses on "the effect Nero had on the theater scene in ancient Rome..." The play was produced at the Arena Stage in 2011.

In 2012, Freed's play "Restoration Comedy" was performed at the Flea Theater. The production was described as "performed with insouciant wit" in a play which "celebrates a libertine spirit that’s hard to deny."

The Monster-Builder premiered at Artists Repertory Theatre, Portland, Oregon, in February 2014. Called a "wonderfully wild and witty play" by Richard Wattenberg, it focuses on a master architect, Gregor Zubrowski, whose "single-minded pursuit of professional glory has stripped him of his humanity."

She wrote Hell to Pay, one of twenty works commissioned by the Berkeley Rep as part of The Food Project. She gave a lecture on the play in February 2014 at Stanford.

Her work has been produced at New York Theatre Workshop, Seattle Repertory, American Conservatory Theater, Goodman Theatre, Playwrights Horizons, Woolly Mammoth Theatre Company and other theaters around the US.

She currently teaches acting and playwriting at Stanford University, where she advised the creators of The Manic Monologues.

=== Honors and awards ===
She has been the recipient of the Kesselring Prize, the Charles MacArthur Award and is a several times winner of the Los Angeles Drama Critics Circle Award.

Freed received the South Coast Repertory (SCR) 2009 Steinberg Commission, which involved a grant from the Harold and Mimi Steinberg Charitable Trust to write a play for SCR.

She was one of five playwrights in the Arena Stage, Washington DC, new program "American Voices New Play Institute", starting in 2010 for three years.

=== Personal ===
She is married to San Francisco Chronicle film critic Mick LaSalle.

== Selected plays ==
- Still Warm 1991. About the life of the television journalist Jessica Savitch.
- Claustrophilia 1993. About the relationship between Edgar Allan Poe and his teen bride.
- The Ghoul of Amherst 1993. A short comic vignette about the poet Emily Dickinson visiting the death bed of a classmate.
- The Psychic Life of Savages 1995. About the lives of poets Ted Hughes and Sylvia Plath.
- Freedomland 1997
- The Beard of Avon 2001
- Safe in Hell 2004
- Restoration Comedy 2005. A reworking of classic Restoration-era comedies by Cibber and Vanbrugh.
- You, Nero 2009. A comedy about the Roman emperor Nero, co-commissioned by South Coast Repertory and Berkeley Rep.
- Hell to Pay Concerning factory farming.
- The Monster-Builder 2014. A satiric play about an egotistical architect, premiered at Portland's Artists Repertory Theatre in 2014.

== See also ==
- The Manic Monologues
