= The Beard of Avon =

2001 play by Amy Freed

- Poster for the 2007 production at Center Stage, Portland
- Original language: English
- Written by: Amy Freed
- Subject: Shakespeare and his wife become involved with the Earl of Oxford
- Genre: Period piece; farce
- Setting: Sixteenth century: Stratford-upon-Avon and London, England

Premiere
- Date: 2001
- Place: South Coast Repertory, Costa Mesa, California

The Beard of Avon is a play by Amy Freed, originally commissioned and produced by South Coast Repertory in 2001. It is a farcical treatment of the Oxfordian theory of Shakespeare authorship, in which both Shakespeare and his wife become involved, in different ways, with secret playwright Edward de Vere and find themselves helping to present the works of several other secretive authors under Shakespeare's name, including Queen Elizabeth I herself.

== Cast of characters ==
Sources: Student Guide, Goodman Theatre Script

=== Lead characters ===
- William Shakspere – A lad of Stratford. In his early thirties. Simple, honest, very appealing fellow. Possessor of hidden gifts. Poses as a playwright under the stage name "William Shakespeare".
- Geoffrey Dunderbread – The Company's slutty Boy player, and leading lady of the Globe Theatre. Shakspere's confidante. Plays the roles of Cleopatra in Antony and Cleopatra, Lavinia in Titus Andronicus, and Katherina in The Taming of the Shrew.
- Edward De Vere - 17th Earl of Oxford. in his forties. Wicked, charming, sexy, brilliant. A closet writer. In a "secret" homosexual affair with Henry Wriothesley
- Henry Wriothesley – 20s. Young and beautiful. Third Earl of Southampton.
- Anne Hathaway – Shakspere's wife. Lively, illiterate, promiscuous. When abandoned by her husband, she goes to London disguised as a whore. She seduces de Vere and becomes Shakspere's "Shadow woman".
- Queen Elizabeth I – Queen of England. Between forty and sixty. A sacred monster. Wants a boyfriend.
- John Heminge – manager of an acting company
- Henry Condel – partner of Heminge

=== Supporting characters ===
Members of Queen Elizabeth’s court:

- Francis Bacon
- Lady Lettice
- Francis Walsingham
- Lord Burleigh
- Earl of Derby

Additional members of Heminge's company

- Richard Burbage – an actor, the leading man
- Walter Fitch, a playwright

== Productions ==
The play premiered at the South Coast Repertory Theater in June 2001, and went on to productions in Salt Lake City and the Seattle Repertory Theatre in November to December 2001.

It opened at the American Conservatory Theater, San Francisco, in January 2002. Freed noted: "There's something about it that has the attractiveness of a good mystery.... You just can't leave it alone." The play was presented at the Goodman Theatre, Chicago, from October 7, 2002, to November 2, 2002, directed by Resident Director David Petrarca.

The play opened Off-Broadway at the New York Theatre Workshop on November 18, 2003 and closed on December 21, 2003. Directed by Doug Hughes, the cast featured Tim Blake Nelson as Will Shakspere [sic], Mary Louise Wilson as Queen Elizabeth, Kate Jennings Grant as wife Anne Hathaway and Mark Harelik as Edward de Vere, the Earl of Oxford (Harelik was in the South Coast Rep production also). The play was nominated for the 2004 Drama Desk Award, Outstanding Play, and Outstanding Featured Actress in a Play, Mary Louise Wilson.

== Critical views ==
The play is described by critic Robert Brustein as a "lusty antidote to all forms of Bardolatry, including the perverse and benighted kind that considers the bard a beard". He describes it as "an extended satiric sketch worthy of Monty Python", but suggests that some of the comic faux-Elizabethan language "fails to pass the test of grammar or scansion". Katherine Scheil emphasises its bawdy aspects, as Anne discovers Will's seedy sex-life, unleashing her own desire to explore "wild and stormy expanses of uncharted filth". According to James Fisher, Freed demonstrates her own affinity with Shakespeare:

Freed—a similarly adept wordsmith—explores the very nature of language itself and the intangible font of creative achievement. Despite occasional bursts of anachronistic broad comedy, Freed proves herself a true ally of Shakespeare in many ways. She amply demonstrates her romance with language, rich characterization, and a bold mix of humor and drama with moments of surprisingly moving pathos in this delightfully crack-brained play...Whether indulging in intricate speechifying or punning banter, Freed's outstanding characteristic as a dramatist is the richness of her ingenious experimentation with the complexities of wordplay.

William S. Niederkorn, in his article on the play for The New York Times quoted Freed: "There's a lot in The Beard of Avon that has to do with my own completely insane love affair with actors and theater... It's very much a valentine to the whole theatrical experience at its silliest and most rewarding... It is a comic perspective, but I really did a lot of reading on all sides of the issue."
