= Meg Miroshnik =

American playwright

Meg Miroshnik (born Minneapolis) is an American playwright.

== Life ==
Miroshnik received a Playwriting MFA from the Yale School of Drama. Her play The Fairytale Lives of Russian Girls won the Alliance/Kendeda National Graduate Playwriting Competition and premiered at the Alliance Theatre in the 2011/2012 season. It was produced again at Yale Rep in 2014, directed by Rachel Chavkin. Also in 2014, Miroshnik returned to the Alliance Theatre with the world premiere of The Tall Girls.

Miroshnik's plays are published by Samuel French. She lives and works in Los Angeles.

Meg Miroshnik is the recipient of a 2012 Whiting Award. She is a dramatic writer whose work features a heightened attention to language. Miroshnik's plays include The Droll{ A Stage Play about the END of theatre}, Old Actress, and an adaption of libretto for Shostakovich's Moscow, Cheryomushki.

She has studied at Moscow State University and worked as a freelance magazine writer.

== Produced works ==
- The Fairytale Lives of Russian Girls - Alliance Theatre (Atlanta, 2012); Yale Rep (New Haven, 2014)
- The Tall Girls - Alliance Theatre (Atlanta, 2014)
- The Droll - Brown/Trinity Playwrights Rep (Providence, 2014) (workshop production); Undermain Theatre (Dallas, 2015)

== Awards and honors ==
- 2012 Alliance/Kendeda National Graduate Playwriting Competition for The Fairytale Lives of Russian Girls
- 2012 Susan Smith Blackburn Prize, Finalist for The Fairytale Lives of Russian Girls
- 2012 Whiting Award
