= The Intelligent Design of Jenny Chow =

- Original language: English
- Written by: Rolin Jones
- Setting: Calabasas, California

Premiere
- Place: South Coast Repertory

The Intelligent Design of Jenny Chow is a play written by Rolin Jones. The play had its world premiere at South Coast Repertory in 2003.

Set in Calabasas, California, it tells the story of Jennifer Marcus, a 22-year-old genius with obsessive compulsive disorder and agoraphobia. Afraid to step outside her house, the Chinese-born Marcus, who was adopted as a baby, nevertheless wants to meet her biological mother. She creates a robot replica of herself to travel across the world.

The play was a 2006 finalist for the Pulitzer Prize for Drama.
