= May Adrales =

Filipino theater director

- Born: Covington, Virginia, U.S.
- Education: University of Virginia (BA); Yale University (MFA)
- Occupations: Director; Teacher
- Website: www.mayadrales.net

May Adrales, whose full name is Jocelyn May Divinagracia Adrales, is a Filipina American theatre director and teacher in New York City.

== Early life ==
May Adrales was born in Covington, Virginia to Filipino immigrant parents. Her mother was a nurse, her father was a general surgeon, and both moved from medical training and residencies in New York to rural Virginia to fill a need for medical professionals. When she was younger, she loved to run, and she still continues this hobby today. She received her Bachelor of Arts in English Literature and Modern Studies from University of Virginia, and her Master of Fine Arts in Directing from the Yale School of Drama.

== Career ==
When asked what inspired her to go into directing, she said, "Be the change you wish to see in the world. I took that adage pretty seriously. I wanted to figure out how to make the world a more joyous, more democratic, and more beautiful place -– a world that embraces complexity, creativity and diversity on every level". She originally wanted to go into law, but eventually found theatre. Even then, though, she was faced with a challenge of access; when she first moved to New York, she had no formal training nor contacts in the business. Additionally, in her words, "For the most part there weren’t stories that reflected my experience or people on stage that looked like me. Theater felt impenetrable". Eventually, in part with the support of a community and a mentor, she became an award-winning professional director, teacher, and artist.

== Reception ==
=== Vietgone ===
In 2016, Adrales directed Vietgone, by Qui Nguyen, at the Manhattan Theatre Club. The show features two Vietnamese refugees who meet in America in 1975, during the fall of Saigon. The production was well-received, earning three Lucille Lortel Award nominations, as well as several rave reviews. The New Yorker mentioned "its resourceful director, May Adrales," in talking about the "gleefully salacious quasi-musical". The Los Angeles Times said that the show was "directed with controlled spunk by May Adrales". Time Out New York, a city-culture promotion website, said, "May Adrales’s high-octane staging moves so swiftly and surely, you may not initially appreciate the buckets of stagecraft she and Nguyen throw at us scene after scene".

=== Chinglish ===
In early 2014, Adrales directed Chinglish, a comedy about cross-cultural communication (or lack thereof) at the Portland Center Stage. This too was well-received. The Oregon Artswatch says, "The show, directed by May Adrales, is as smooth as its revolving scene changes, capturing a brittle and deftly timed presentational comic edge in its performances and navigating the tricky shoals of its bilingual text (about a quarter of the dialogue is in Mandarin, with English supertitles) without an apparent hitch".

== Awards ==
- Stage Directors and Choreographers Foundation’s Denham Fellowship
- TCG New Generations grant
- Paul Green Emerging Theatre Artist Award
- Directing fellowships:
  - New York Theatre Workshop
  - Women's Project
  - SoHo Rep
  - The Drama League

== Teaching ==
- Director of On Site Programs at the Lark Play Development Center
- Artistic Associate for The Public Theater
- Associate Artistic Director for Milwaukee Repertory Theatre
- Faculty member for
  - The Public Theater’s Shakespeare Lab
  - The Einhorn School of Performing Arts at Primary Stages
  - Brown University/Trinity Rep
  - Yale School of Drama

== Selected list ==
- Vietgone, by Qui Nguyen
- Luce, by JC Lee at the Lincoln Center Theater
- Dance and the Railroad, by David Henry Hwang, at the Signature Theater
- Tokyo Fish Story, by Kimber Lee (upcoming), at the Old Globe Theater
- Electric Baby, by Stefanie Zadravec, at the Two River Theater
- after all the terrible things I do, by A. Rey Pamatmat, at the Milwaukee Repertory Theater
- Chinglish, by David Henry Hwang, at the Portland Center Stage
- Breath and Imagination, by Daniel Beaty, at the Cleveland Playhouse
- Deathtrap, by Ira Levin, at the Pioneer Theatre
