= Dinner with Friends =

1998 play by Donald Margulies

- Written by: Donald Margulies
- Characters: Karen and Gabe; Tom and Beth
- Original language: English
- Setting: Connecticut

Premiere
- Date premiered: 1998
- Place premiered: Humana Festival of New American Plays

Dinner with Friends is a play by Donald Margulies. It premiered at the 1998 Humana Festival of New American Plays and opened Off-Broadway in 1999. The play received the 2000 Pulitzer Prize for Drama.

== Plot ==
Gabe and Karen, a happily married, middle-aged couple, live in Connecticut. They have been friends with Tom and Beth, another married couple, for many years. In fact, it was Gabe and Karen who introduced their friends in the first place. While having dinner at Gabe and Karen's home, Beth tearfully reveals that she is getting a divorce from Tom, who has been unfaithful.

Tom, who had been away on business, finds out that Beth has told their friends about the looming divorce, and hastens to Gabe and Karen's home. Tom and Beth had planned to tell their friends about their breakup together, but Tom now believes that Beth unfairly has presented herself as the wronged party, and feels he must present his own side of the story.

The time flashes back 12 years to a vacation home on Martha's Vineyard, when Karen and Gabe introduce Beth to Tom. Over the course of the play, both couples are seen at different ages and stages of their lives. Tom and Beth's breakup affects Gabe and Karen, who first feel compelled to choose sides, and then begin to question the strength of their own seemingly tranquil marriage. They also begin to see the real meaning behind their friendships with Tom and Beth.

== Productions ==
The play was initially produced at the Humana Festival of New American Plays (Louisville, Kentucky) in March 1998. The Humana production was directed by Michael Bloom and featured Adam Grupper and Linda Purl as Gabe and Karen and Devore Millman and David Byron as Beth and Tom.

A revised version was presented at South Coast Repertory in Costa Mesa, California, in October 1998. The South Coast Rep production starred Julie White (Beth), John Carroll Lynch (Gabe), Jane Kaczmarek (Karen) and T. Scott Cunningham (Tom).

Dinner with Friends premiered Off-Broadway at the Variety Arts Theatre on November 4, 1999 after previews from October 22 and an out-of-town tryout in Stamford, Connecticut from October 12 to 17. The director was Daniel J. Sullivan (at South Coast Rep and Off-Broadway), with sets by Neil Patel, costumes by Jess Goldstein and lighting by Rui Rita.

=== Original Off-Broadway cast ===
- Gabe: Matthew Arkin
- Karen: Lisa Emery
- Beth: Julie White
- Tom: Kevin Kilner

The play was revived Off-Broadway by the Roundabout Theatre Company at the Laura Pels Theatre, running from February 2014 to April 13, 2014. Directed by Pam MacKinnon, the cast featured Heather Burns (Beth), Marin Hinkle (Karen), Darren Pettie (Tom) and Jeremy Shamos (Gabe).

=== Canada ===
Joyce Dewitt appeared in a Canadian production of the play at Hamilton's Theatre Aquarius in 2011.

=== UK productions ===
The play had its UK premiere at the Hampstead Theatre, London in July 2001. Directed by Simon Curtis, the cast featured Elizabeth McGovern and Kevin Anderson as Beth and Tom, and Rolf Saxon and Samantha Bond as Gabe and Karen. Dinner with Friends is presented in London at the Park Theatre, from October 27, 2015 to November 28. Directed by Tom Attenborough, the cast features Harry Dhillon as Tom, Finty Williams as Beth, and Shaun Dooley and Sara Stewart as Gabe and Karen.

=== Paris ===
The play ran in Paris at the Comédie des Champs-Élysées in 1999, directed by Michel Fagadau and titled Dîner Entre Amis. The cast featured Didier Sandre (Tom), Catherine Frot, Jean-Pierre Malo and Liana Fulga.

=== Regional US productions ===
The play made its Los Angeles debut at the Geffen Playhouse in October 2000. Directed by Daniel Sullivan, the cast starred Kevin Kilner (Tom), Dana Delany (Beth), Rita Wilson (Karen) and Daniel Stern (Gabe). The play has had other regional productions, including the Alliance Theatre, Atlanta; Berkeley Repertory Theatre, California; the Old Globe Theatre; the Portland Stage, Maine (2005); and the Philadelphia Theatre Company (2001).

== Critical response ==
Elyse Sommer, the CurtainUp reviewer, in writing of the original 1999 production, wrote: "Happily the author of 'Collected Stories' and 'Sight Unseen' has once again marshaled his ability to free character and situation prototypes from their cookie cutter mold familiarity. Just as happily, director Daniel Sullivan has given the script a handsome, smoothly orchestrated production and four actors who fuse Margulies' words with the finesse of a finely tuned string quartet."

The reviewer of the original production for Aisle Say NY wrote: "...when it threatens to be schematic and predictable, it is anything but; and what would seem to be a light comedy about friendship and shifting loyalties, becomes instead a surprisingly touching rumination about the changes that come with age: the changes redefining relationships, the changes within relationships, the impact new relationships have on old, and the balances and affections that shift unexpectedly, just because, despite our reluctance to want to accept it, life goes on."

The CurtainUp reviewer, in writing of the 2014 revival, concluded: "But for all its richly flavored dialogue and characterizations, the dinner served up at the Laura Pels doesn't resonate as quite the gourmet meal it once was. It's a well structured, insightful play but it leaves you hungry for seeing Mr. Margulies apply his considerable gifts to more currently significant themes."

== Awards and nominations ==
- 2000 Pulitzer Prize for Drama
- 2000 Lucille Lortel Award for Outstanding Off-Broadway Play
- 1999 Dramatists Guild/Hull-Warriner Award
- 2000 Outer Critics Circle Award, Outstanding Off Broadway Play and Outstanding Director of a Play (The Lucille Lortel Award)
- 2000 Drama Desk Award nominations for Play, Featured Actor (Arkin), Director, and Set Design
- 1999 American Theatre Critics Association New Play Award
- 2014 Lucille Lortel Award, Outstanding Featured Actor in a Play, Jeremy Shamos

== Film adaptation ==
The play was adapted into a 2001 HBO TV movie starring Dennis Quaid as Gabe, Andie MacDowell as Karen, Greg Kinnear as Tom, and Toni Collette as Beth. The movie was directed by Norman Jewison with the screenplay by Margulies.
