= Gordon Edelstein =

American theatre director

Gordon Edelstein is an American theatre director. He was Artistic Director of the Long Wharf Theatre in New Haven, Connecticut from 2002 until January 2018, when he was fired following allegations of sexual misconduct.

== Biography ==
He received a Bachelor of Arts degree with honors in History and Religious Studies from Grinnell College in 1976. Prior to assuming artistic leadership of Long Wharf Theatre, Edelstein helmed Seattle’s ACT Theatre for five years.

== Directing Credits ==
- At ACT, they "include the American premiere of Martin McDonagh's A Skull in Connemara (later presented off-Broadway by the Roundabout Theatre Company), the world premiere of Lisette Lecat Ross's Scent of the Roses with Julie Harris, and the world premiere adaptation of God of Vengeance by Donald Margulies. His inaugural ACT production of Death of a Salesman was named "One of the Best Dramas of 1998" by the Seattle Times."
- At Long Wharf, they include the world premieres of Michael Henry Brown's The Day the Bronx Died, Joyce Carol Oates's How Do You Like Your Meat?, David Wiltse's A Dance Lesson, and the Joe Kennan/Brad Ross musical The Times; plus Joe Sutton's Voir Dire and Eugene O'Neill's Anna Christie. His productions of Christopher Hampton's The Philanthropist and David Ives' All in the Timing both received awards from the Connecticut Critics Circle.

== Awards ==
In 2008, he was awarded the Tom Killen Award by the Connecticut Critics Circle, their highest honor, because of "his contributions to theater arts in the state. Edelstein has directed more than 100 plays, musicals and operas across the U.S. and Europe." He was awarded an Honorary Doctorate of Fine Arts from Grinnell College in 2003.

== Sexual harassment allegations ==
On January 22, 2018, Edelstein was put on administrative leave from the Long Wharf Theatre, pending review of allegations of sexual harassment and misconduct. Four women have come forward with complaints of his behavior, dating back to 2003.

He was fired on January 23, 2018.

On January 24, 2018, Edelstein was stripped of an honorary degree that had been awarded to him by Albertus Magnus College, after he joked about having sex with the college's nuns. Patricia Twohill, the prioress of the Dominican Sisters of Peace described the joke as "salacious" and said the sisters are "deeply offended".
