= Steven Drukman =

American dramatist

Steven Drukman is an American playwright and journalist.

== Biography ==
In 2000, Drukman received a Ph.D. from New York University, where he is currently an associate professor. Drukman spent many years writing for the Arts and Leisure section of The New York Times.

Drukman's first play, Going Native, premiered at the Long Wharf Theatre in 2002. The cast included Billy Porter and Jessica Walter. In 2016, his play about Ted Williams, titled Going to See the Kid, received its world premiere at Merrimack Repertory Theatre in Lowell, MA and was nominated for an IRNE Award. In 2014, Death of the Author (published by Dramatists Play Service) premiered at the Geffen Playhouse in Los Angeles, after being part of the 7@7 Series at Manhattan Theatre Club. Variety's Bob Verini called it "hands down, one of the very best plays of the year." Drukman's play The Prince of Atlantis received its world premiere at South Coast Repertory in April and was published in the July/August issue of American Theatre magazine. In This Corner, which examines the lives of boxers Joe Louis and Max Schmeling between 1930–1970, premiered at The Old Globe Theatre in San Diego, CA in January 2008 and received the San Diego Critics Circle award for Best New Play. The Bullet Round received its world premiere at Arena Stage in Portland, Oregon in 2009.

His first feature film, To Whom I May Concern, will premiere in 2018.

In 2010, The Innocents was presented at the Asolo Repertory Theatre's "Unplugged" festival of new works and received its world premiere there in 2011. His play, Marquis Aurelius, appeared in the same festival in 2013.

One of his best known works is Another Fine Mess, which was an entrant for a Pulitzer Prize in 2003 and premiered at Portland Center Stage. His play Going Native premiered in 2002 at the Long Wharf Theatre in New Haven, Connecticut. Drukman is also the author of two adaptations of plays by Alexander Ostrovsky, titled Flattery Will Get You, which premiered at Connecticut Repertory Theatre, and Snowmaiden, which premiered at the Bob Hope Theater in Dallas, Texas.

He is featured in Susan Johann's Focus on Playwrights: Portraits and Interviews, published by the University of South Carolina press.

Additionally, he edited a collection of works by Craig Lucas titled The Dying Gaul and Other Screenplays. As an actor, he was a member of Chicago's Organic Theater Company and appeared in the 2006 film East Broadway.
