= Kate Jennings Grant =

American actress

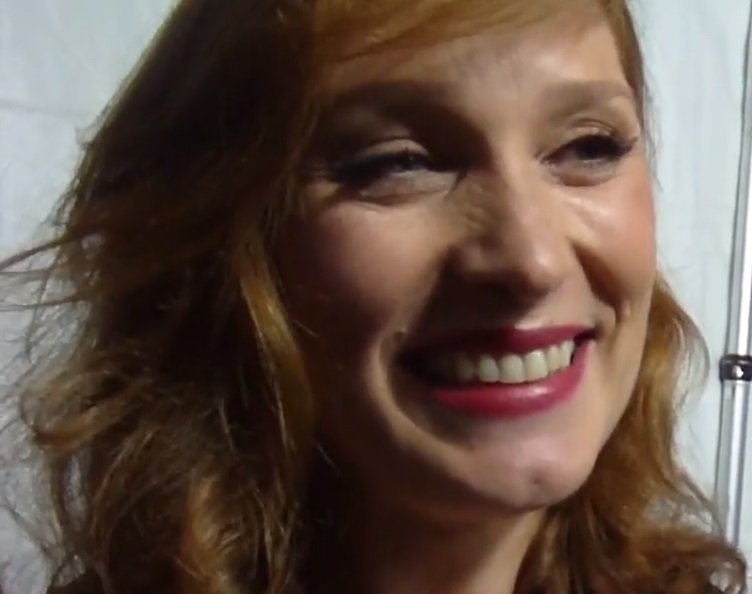
- Born: March 23, 1970 (age 56); Elizabeth, New Jersey, U.S.
- Education: University of Pennsylvania (BA); Juilliard School (GrDip)
- Occupation: Actress
- Years active: 1996–present
- Spouse: Doug Hughes

Kate Jennings Grant (born March 23, 1970) is an American actress. She has appeared in a number of Broadway productions during her career, including Proof, An American Daughter, and Guys and Dolls. She also has appeared in films such as United 93 (2006) and Frost/Nixon (2008).

== Life and career ==
Katherine Grant was born on March 23, 1970, in Elizabeth, New Jersey. She attended the Juilliard School and the University of Pennsylvania. Shortly after graduating from Juilliard, she appeared in the 1996 US tour of the musical Applause, as "Eve", with Stefanie Powers. She appeared Off-Broadway in Wonderland in 1999, Hard Feelings in 2000, Summer of '42 in 2001, Radiant Baby in 2003, The Beard of Avon in 2003, Between Us in 2004, and The Marriage of Bette and Boo by Christopher Durang in 2008.

Grant appeared on Broadway in An American Daughter as "Quincy Quince", and in Proof as "Claire", from July 2, 2002 - January 5, 2003, both as replacements. She appeared in Guys and Dolls in 2009 as "Sarah Brown", The Lyons in 2012, The Country House in 2014, and Noises Off officially opening in January 2016.

On television, Grant has guest starred on Sex and the City, Law & Order, Law & Order: Criminal Intent, Law & Order: Special Victims Unit, Damages, Supernatural and many other shows. She had the recurring roles in the ABC political drama Commander in Chief and Amazon political satire Alpha House. In film, she made her debut in the 1998 romantic comedy The Object of My Affection starring Jennifer Aniston, and the following years had supporting parts in films include Kinsey and When a Stranger Calls. She played Lauren Catuzzi Grandcolas in the 2006 biographical drama United 93, and appeared as Diane Sawyer in the 2008 historical drama Frost/Nixon. She also appeared in The Rebound (2009), Love & Other Drugs (2010), and Custody (2016).

In 2016, Grant was cast in her first series regular role on the ABC drama series Notorious playing Louise Herrick, the host of a news program at the center of the series.

== Filmography ==
=== Film ===
Year	Film	Role	Notes
1998	The Object of My Affection	Kennedy	
2004	The Dead Will Tell	Liz	Television film
2004	Kinsey	Marjorie Hartford	
2005	Trust the Man	Woman Who Can't Get Enough	
2006	Forgiven	Jamie Doyle	BendFilm Festival Award for Best Supporting Actress
2006	When a Stranger Calls	Kelly Mandrakis	
2006	United 93	Lauren Catuzzi Grandcolas	
2008	Blackout	Sister-in-law	
2008	Frost/Nixon	Diane Sawyer	
2009	The Rebound	Daphne	
2010	Love & Other Drugs	Gina	
2016	Custody	Nancy	
2017	Half the Perfect World	Charlotte	

=== Television ===
Year	Title	Role	Notes
1998	Sex and the City	Alison Roth	Episode: "The Monogamists"
1998	Trinity	Jamie Chechik	Episode: "Pilot"
2001	JAG	Sgt. Joan Steele	Episode: "Valor"
2001	Law & Order	Kate Pierce	Episode: "Deep Vote"
2005	Commander in Chief	Reporter Samantha	Recurring role, 3 episodes
2006	Supernatural	Dr. Amanda Lee	Episode: "Croatoan"
2006	3 lbs.	Kristen Lund	Episode: "The God Spot"
2008	Cold Case	Beth Ross	Episode: "Sabotage"
2009	Damages	Cynthia Shayes	Episodes: "You Got Your Prom Date Pregnant" and "Trust Me"
2010	Law & Order: Criminal Intent	Cynthia Novak	Episode: "Gods & Insects"
2010	Rescue Me	Memory Jean	Episode: "Blackout"
2010	White Collar	Catherine Mcmillan	Episode: "In the Red"
2010	Parenthood	Jennifer	Episodes: "I'm Cooler Than You Think" and "Seven Names"
2011	Body of Proof	Jill Paige	Episode: "Pilot"
2011	Royal Pains	Dr. Sylvander	Episode: "An Apple a Day"
2011	Pan Am	Judith Cameron	Episodes: "Pilot" and "We'll Always Have Paris"
2012	I Just Want My Pants Back	Maya	Episode: "Sextipated"
2012	Made in Jersey	Gale	Episode: "Payday"
2013	The Carrie Diaries	Kick Silver	Episode: "Dangerous Territory"
2014	The Good Wife	Dr. Natalie Henley	Episode: "Tying the Knot"
2014	Alpha House	Courtney Townsend	Recurring role, 4 episodes
2015	Blue Bloods	SWAT Team Leader	Episode: "In the Box"
2015	Law & Order: Special Victims Unit	Judge Marian Adams	Episode: "December Solstice"
2015	Elementary	Lydia Guerrero	Episode: "The View from Olympus"
2015	Madam Secretary	FBI Agent Teresa Pagani	Episode: "The Kill List"
2015	Neon Joe, Werewolf Hunter	Karen	Episode: "Bark Bark Yum Yum"
2016	Billions	Evelyn Benson	Episode: "YumTime"
2016	Notorious	Louise Herrick	Series regular
2019	Russian Doll	Young Ruth	Episode: "The Way Out"
2022–2024	Pretty Little Liars	Madame Giry	Recurring role; 11 episodes
2023	Law & Order	Debra Gates	Episode: "Appraisal"
2025	Elsbeth	Beryl Nix	season 3 episode 4 "Ick, a Bod"
