= South Coast Repertory =

Non-profit theatre organization

Coordinates: 33°41′31.73″N 117°52′56.52″W

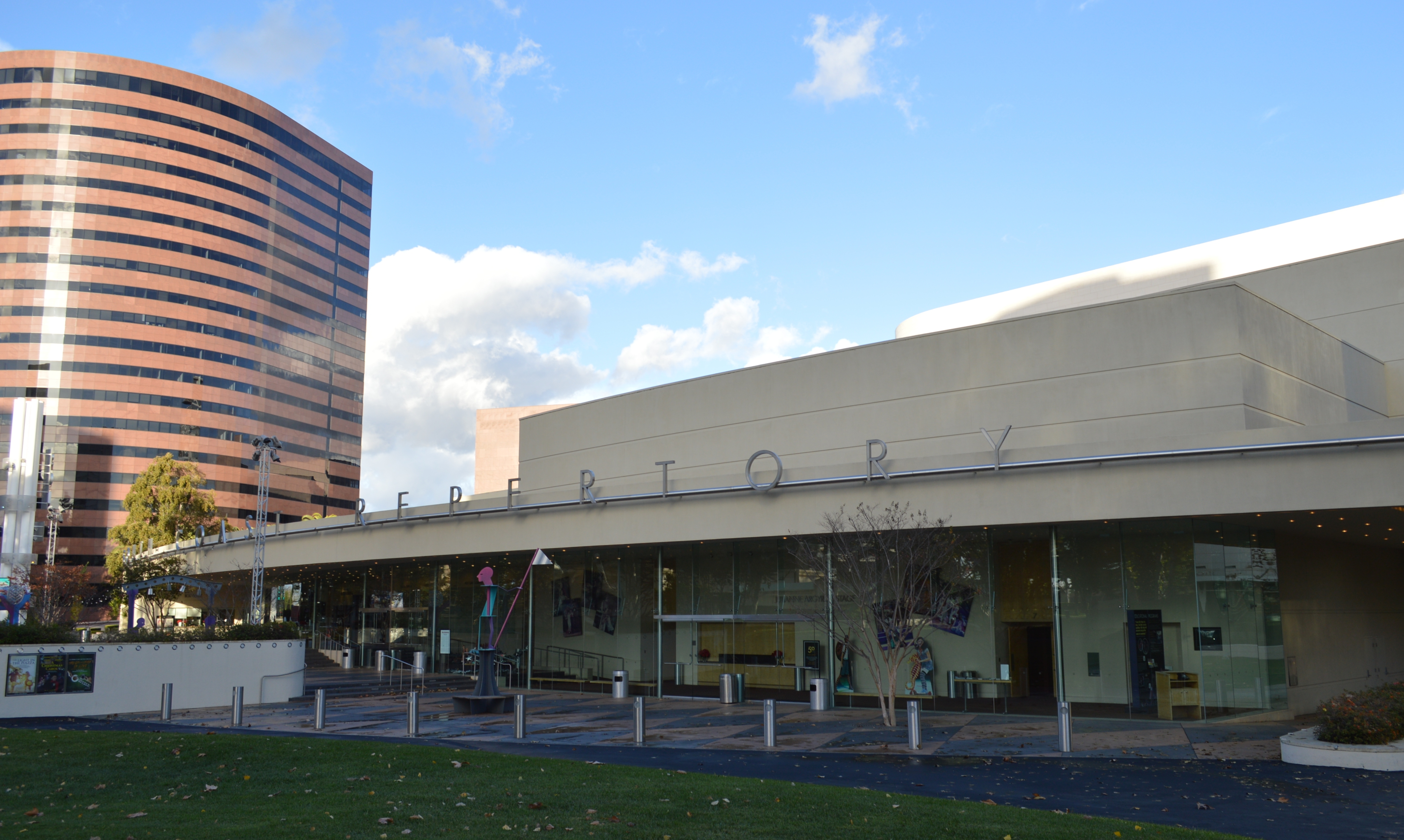
- South Coast Repertory
- Interactive map of South Coast Repertory
- Address: 655 Town Center Drive; Costa Mesa, California; United States
- Capacity: Segerstrom Stage: 507; Julianne Argyros Stage: 336; Nicholas Studio: 94
- Type: Regional theatre

Construction
- Opened: 1964

Website
- www.scr.org

South Coast Repertory (SCR) is a professional theatre company located in Costa Mesa, California. Founded in 1964, it currently has three stages. SCR produces old plays, new plays, Theatre for Young Audiences, and offers year-round programs in education and outreach.

== Background ==
SCR's extensive new play development program, The Lab@SCR, consists of commissions, residencies, readings, and workshops, from which world premieres are produced each season. Among the plays commissioned and introduced at SCR are Donald Margulies' Sight Unseen, and Brooklyn Boy; Richard Greenberg's Three Days of Rain and The Violet Hour; David Henry Hwang's Golden Child; Amy Freed's The Beard of Avon; Qui Nguyen’s Vietgone; Lucas Hnath’s A Doll’s House, Part 2; and Lauren Yee’s Cambodian Rock Band. These plays were commissioned and developed through the Pacific Playwrights Festival.

Forty percent of the plays SCR has produced have been world, American, or West Coast premieres. In 1988, SCR received the Regional Theatre Tony Award for Distinguished Achievement, particularly in the area of new play development.

== History ==
David Emmes and Martin Benson attended San Francisco State University. After graduation, Emmes and Benson gathered a few San Francisco friends in summer 1963 to stage Arthur Schnitzler's La Ronde at the Off-Broadway Theatre in Long Beach, California.

Emmes and Benson continued by touring to rented stages. In November 1964, SCR's first production, Molière's Tartuffe, opened at the Newport Beach Ebell Club. The next step would be their own location, a theatre in Orange County, California.

=== A converted hardware store ===
For their Second Step, a two-story marine hardware store on Balboa Peninsula was rented and converted into a 75-seat proscenium stage. It opened on March 12, 1965, with a production of Waiting for Godot. For years, everyone involved maintained full-time day jobs and worked nights and weekends without pay.

=== The Mainstage with 507 seats ===
Within two years, artistic and financial momentum had picked up and SCR looked toward its Third Step: a converted Sprouse-Reitz Variety Store on Newport Boulevard in Costa Mesa. The building, adapted to hold 217 seats, opened in 1967.

It was at the Third Step, 1967–1978, that SCR moved from a local group to a regional force, and matured both artistically and organizationally. Operating income went from US$20,000 to US$55,000 in the first two seasons. By the fifth season, paid staff had grown from one, Warren Deacon as Associate Artistic and Managing Director, to five. A first grant from the National Endowment for the Arts helped expand the staff. The Los Angeles Drama Critics Circle gave SCR its first award in 1970 for "consistent achievement in production." In 1976, SCR joined the League of Resident Theatres (LORT) and was able to contract for members of Actors' Equity.

In September 1978, the theatre opened with a production of William Saroyan's The Time of Your Life. At first, there was only the 507-seat Mainstage. But by 1979, the large rehearsal hall had been converted into a 161-seat Second Stage. SCR had reached its long-sought goal: a two-theatre complex, owned and operated by the company itself.

=== 1980s and 1990s ===
During the 1980s, SCR's interest in new play development moved to the forefront. In 1985, the NEA awarded SCR a Challenge Grant, which helped finance the creation of the Collaboration Laboratory (Colab), which would support all play development in the future.

The 1985-86 Season unveiled Colab's first two public programs: the NewSCRipts play reading series and the Hispanic Playwrights Project. Also that season, ground was broken on a distinctive addition to the building called The Artists Wing.

Two of Beth Henley's plays, The Debutante Ball (1985) and Abundance (1989), premiered at SCR. Anna Maria Simo's Passion premiered as a reading during the Hispanic Playwrights Project there in 1987.

During the 1990s, SCR solidified its national reputation for play development. Writers were discovered, nurtured, and then championed. Margaret Edson, whose Wit premiere at SCR in 1995, won the 1999 Pulitzer Prize for Drama. Donald Margulies, whose Sight Unseen and Collected Stories originated at SCR before meeting with New York success, won the 2000 Pulitzer for Dinner With Friends. Other playwrights who had multiple premieres at SCR also became familiar names in theatres across America: Amy Freed, Craig Lucas, Howard Korder, Keith Reddin, Octavio Solis, and Richard Greenberg, who has had 10 commissioned world premieres at SCR.

In the summer of 1998, following its 35th anniversary season, SCR launched the Pacific Playwrights Festival, its most ambitious new play project to date. The Pacific Playwrights Festival incorporated the Hispanic Playwrights Project, two world premieres, and workshops or staged readings of seven more new plays.

By the end of 1998, SCR began pursuing its long-held expansion goal when the Segerstrom family donated land. That land, along with a similar donation to the neighboring Orange County Performing Arts Center, established the Segerstrom Center for the Arts. Within weeks, SCR received its first gift of more than US$1 million, when Henry and Stacey Nicholas gave US$1.28 million (eventually doubling their gift to US$2.5 million to name the renovated Second Stage the Nicholas Studio) and launched "SCR: The Next Stage" Campaign, initially to raise US$40 million. Architect César Pelli was enlisted for both the center's and SCR's expansion, with SCR's construction beginning first.

The first season in the Folino Theatre Center earned good reviews and introduced three plays — Greenberg's The Violet Hour, Lynn Nottage's Intimate Apparel and Rolin Jones' The Intelligent Design of Jenny Chow. All have since gone on to major productions in New York and elsewhere.

== Recent history ==
The first major leadership transition for SCR occurred in 2011, when Marc Masterson became the theatre's new artistic director and served until 2018. Emmes and Benson moved into the roles of Founding Artistic Directors and served as advisors.

From 2012 to 2016, SCR hosted "Studio SCR," a series that partnered the theatre with a variety of Southern Californian artists to create an eclectic contemporary theatre experience.

In 2013, Paul Folino requested that his name be withdrawn from the Theatre Center and that it be renamed the David Emmes/Martin Benson Theatre Center, to honor SCR's founders. The unveiling of the building's new name took place on January 22, 2014.

The 2015–16 season brought the world premiere of Qui Nguyen's Vietgone—in association with Manhattan Theatre Club. The production moved to Manhattan Theatre Club for its 2016–17 season. Vietgone earned a Los Angeles Drama Critics Circle Ted Schmitt Award for Best World Premiere of the Year, along with the prestigious Harold and Mimi Steinberg / American Theatre Critics Association New Play Award and a Lucille Lortel Award in New York for Outstanding Projection Design. It also was a finalist for the Edward M. Kennedy Prize for Drama Inspired by American History. In addition, SCR's 52nd season included world premieres by Sandra Tsing Loh (The Madwoman in the Volvo), Bekah Brunstetter (Going to a Place where you Already Are) and Eliza Clark (Future Thinking).

The 2016–17 season featured four world premieres: The Siegel by Michael Mitnick; Yoga Play by Dipika Guha; Flora & Ulysses by John Glore; and A Doll's House, Part 2 by Lucas Hnath (an SCR commission), which had a nearly simultaneous second production on Broadway. SCR's annual showcase of new works, the Pacific Playwrights Festival, celebrated its 20th year.

The 2017–18 season included the musical Once, as well as Shakespeare in Love, The Sisters Rosensweig by Wendy Wasserstein and Gem of the Ocean by August Wilson. The season featured five world premieres including Amos & Boris by Sofia Alvarez; Curve of Departure by Rachel Bonds; SHREW! by Amy Freed; Little Black Shadows by Kemp Powers; and Cambodian Rock Band by Lauren Yee, commissioned through SCR's CrossRoads Initiative. Yee's Cambodian Rock Band received the prestigious Harold and Mimi Steinberg / American Theatre Critics Association Award in 2019. Masterson stepped down as artistic director at the end of the season.

David Ivers was named as the theatre's Artistic Director on Sept. 20, 2018.

In late 2019, SCR re-branded, expanded and deepened its new-play development program by launching The Lab@SCR. Among the new features of the theatre's renowned play development program was the creation of the Pinnacle Commission for major American playwrights. The inaugural commission—given in partnership with Playwrights Horizons (New York)—was $60,000. Award-winning playwright Branden Jacobs-Jenkins was named the inaugural recipient in 2023. The Pinnacle Commission is one of the largest theatre-granted commissions in the nation.

While its stages went dark during the pandemic, SCR continued its work to deepen engagement with Orange County, Calif., communities through various avenues, including SCR commUNITY, launched in August 2020. This new digital platform was dedicated to amplifying the artists and narratives of the region by producing stories inspired by or about the rich diversity of people living in Southern California. Using “virtual/digital” platforms, SCR commUNITY created free play readings, interviews, radio plays and original innovative content. The first three SCR commUNITY events included MASA, a live reading of works by four playwrights, as well as a live interview with playwright Octavio Solis.

Since the theatre’s return to live performance in fall 2021, SCR remains a home for the development of new plays, and the theatre continues to produce multiple world premieres each season. Recent world premieres include Christine Quintana’s Espejos: Clean (2022); Charlie Oh’s Coleman ’72 (2023); Michael Shayan’s avaaz (2023); a musical adaptation of Prelude to a Kiss, with a book by Craig Lucas, music by Daniel Messé and lyrics by Sean Hartley (2024); Eleanor Burgess’s Galilee, 34 (2024); Daniel Goldstein’s Joan (2024); Noa Gardner’s The Staircase (2025); Keiko Green’s You Are Cordially Invited to the End of the World! (2025); Talene Monahon’s Eat Me (2026) and Reggie D. White’s Fremont Ave. in a co-production with Washington D.C.’s Arena Stage (2026). Many of these plays have gone on to subsequent productions at theatres across the country.

During SCR's 60th season, the theatre began preparing for its next chapter when, in November 2023, Managing Director Paula Tomei announced she would step down at the end of the season after 44 years with the company, including the last 30 as its first managing director. After a national search, the Board of Trustees appointed Suzanne Appel as managing director and co-CEO with Artistic Director David Ivers. Appel, who came from Off-Broadway's Vineyard Theatre, began her tenure in September 2024.

David Emmes and Martin Benson co-directed the company for 46 years. They helmed 213 productions for the company, including works by George Bernard Shaw, and won the Los Angeles Drama Critics Circle Award for Distinguished Achievement in Directing seven times.

On November 30, 2024, Benson died in his sleep at age 87.
