= Maria Mileaf =

American theater director

- Born: Maria Joy Mileaf c. 1965 (age 60–61); New York City
- Education: Yale University (BA); University of California, San Diego (MFA)
- Spouse: Neil Patel
- Children: 2
- Awards: Outer Critics Circle Award; Barrymore Award

Maria Mileaf (born c. 1965) is an American stage director. She has directed productions on and off Broadway and in the West End, as well as at regional theaters including Williamstown Theatre Festival, The Old Globe, and La Jolla Playhouse.

Mileaf directed the national tour of Art by Yasmina Reza in 1999, which previously won the Tony Award for Best Play. Her production of Going to St. Ives by Lee Blessing at Primary Stages received the Outer Critics Circle Award for Outstanding New Off-Broadway Play, while her production of The Story by Tracey Scott Wilson at Philadelphia Theatre Company earned her the Barrymore Award for Outstanding Direction of a Play.

She directed the West End premiere of Underneath the Lintel by Glen Berger at the Duchess Theatre in 2007, and later helmed Let There Be Love by Kwame Kwei-Armah at the American Conservatory Theater. From 2016 to 2018, she directed multiple productions of Sharon Washington’s solo show Feeding the Dragon, which received nominations for the Outer Critics Circle Award and the Lucille Lortel Award.

== Early life and education ==
Mileaf was born in New York City, and primarily raised in Highland Park, New Jersey.

She received a B.A. in Literature from Yale University in 1986. Alongside classmates Christopher Ashley and Tony Phelan, Mileaf won the Libby Zion Fellowship, a $10,000 prize awarded by Frank Sinatra. Upon graduating, the trio used the prize money to start a summer repertory theatre in Irvington, New York Mileaf went on to earn an M.F.A. in Directing from the University of California, San Diego in 1990.

== Career ==
Shortly after completing graduate school, Mileaf served as Associate Director on Arthur Miller's The Crucible at the Los Angeles Theatre Center. In 1992, she directed the U.S. premiere of Ödön von Horváth's 1933 drama Faith, Hope and Charity at the San Diego Repertory Theatre. Mileaf made her Off-Broadway debut in 1993, directing the U.S. premiere of Sarah Daniels The Gut Girls with the Obie Award-winning Cucaracha Theatre Company in Tribeca. In 1994, she was awarded a Boris Sagal and Bill Foeller Fellowship from the Williamstown Theatre Festival. That same year she directed the world premiere of Scar by Caridad Svich at the Perishable Theatre in Providence, Rhode Island. In 1996 she directed the east coast premiere of a double bill of one-act comedies, Missing Marisa and Kissing Christine by John Patrick Shanley for Phoenix Theatre in Purchase, New York. That same year she directed the Off-Broadway premiere of Tomorrowland by Neena Beber with New Georges/Soho Rep. In 1997 she directed Jeannie Hutchins' experimental performance piece Laugh Till I Thought I'd Die, which ran from October 23 - November 9 at PS 122.

In 1998 Mileaf directed Brighde Mullins' Fire Eater at New York Stage and Film's Powerhouse Theater. The same year she served as Associate Director on U.S. premiere of Yasmina Reza’s Art, which played the Bernard B. Jacobs Theatre on Broadway from February 12, 1998 – August 8, 1999 and won the Tony Award for Best Play. Mileaf subsequently directed the play’s 1st National Tour, which ran from September 14th, 1999 to May 7th, 2000, and culminated in a month-long engagement at The Kennedy Center in Washington, D.C. In 1999 Mileaf directed the Actor's Theatre of Louisville's National Ten-Minute Play Contest for their annual Humana Festival of New American Plays, which ran from March 12 – 27, 1999. The combined bill of plays, entitled Life Under 30, included "Slop-Culture" by Robb Badlam, "The Blue Room" by Courtney Baron, "Dancing With a Devil" by Brooke Berman, "Forty Minute Finish" by Jerome Hairston, "Mpls., St. Paul" by Julia Jordan, "Drive Angry" by Matt Pelfrey, "Labor Day" by Sheri Wilner, and "Just Be Frank" by Caroline Williams. That same year she directed the world premiere of Erik Ehn's MAID Off-Broadway for the Lincoln Center Theater Festival, which ran from July 7 – 25; she also directed the Off-Broadway premiere of Kira Obolensky's Lobster Alice at Playwrights Horizons starring Jessica Hecht, which ran from November 17, 1999 – January 23, 2000.

In 2000, Mileaf directed the Off-Broadway premiere of Neena Beber's Hard Feelings at Women's Project Theater, and Lee Blessing's Going to St. Ives at the La Jolla Playhouse. In 2001, Mileaf collaborated once again with French playwright Yasmina Reza on the west coast premiere of her play The Unexpected Man at the Geffen Playhouse in Los Angeles. In 2002 she directed the Off-Broadway premiere of Julia Cho's 99 Histories at the Cherry Lane Theatre. In 2003 she directed the U.S. premiere of Éric-Emmanuel Schmitt's M. Ibrahim and the Flowers of the Koran Off-Broadway at McGinn/Cazale Theatre with PlayCo. In 2004 she directed the Off-Broadway premiere of Brighde Mullins' Those Who Can, Do with Clubbed Thumb. In 2005 she directed two plays at the Williamstown Theatre Festival; Lucy Prebble's The Sugar Syndrome, starring Gaby Hoffmann, and John Belluso's A Nervous Smile, starring Amy Brenneman. That same year she directed three Off-Broadway premieres; Alexandra Gersten-Vassilaros' The Argument at Vineyard Theatre; Lee Blessing's Going to St. Ives at Primary Stages; and Vijay Tendulkar's Sakharam Binder with PlayCo at 59E59 Theaters.

In 2006 Mileaf directed Glen Berger's Underneath the Lintel at the George Street Playhouse, starring Richard Schiff.In 2007, the production transferred to the Duchess Theatre in London's West End, and was broadcast via BBC Radio 4. That same year, Mileaf returned to the Williamstown Theatre Festival to direct Nöel Coward's Blithe Spirit, starring Jessica Hecht; as well as Wendy Wasserstein's final play, Third, at the Geffen Playhouse. In 2008 she directed two plays Off-Broadway; Brooke Berman's A Perfect Couple at the Daryl Roth Theatre, and Lee Blessing's A Body of Water at Primary Stages. In 2013 Mileaf directed N. Richard Nash's The Rainmaker at The Old Globe, and Arthur Machen's The Great God Pan at The Juilliard School. In 2015 she directed Kwame Kwei-Armah's Let There Be Love at the American Conservatory Theater in San Francisco, California. From 2014-2019, Mileaf directed four plays for 59E59 Theaters's Summer Shorts Series. From 2016-2018, Mileaf directed three successive productions of Sharon Washington's one-woman show Feeding the Dragon at City Theatre, Hartford Stage, and Primary Stages.

Mileaf is also a frequent collaborator with the Philadelphia Theatre Company, where she has directed eight productions, including of Paula Vogel's How I Learned to Drive in 1998; Martin McDonagh's The Beauty Queen of Leenane in 1999; Margaret Edson's Wit in 2000; Barbara Ehrenreich's Nickel and Dimed in 2004; Tracey Scott Wilson's The Story in 2005; Lynn Nottage's Ruined in 2011; Neil LaBute's Reasons to Be Pretty in 2012; and Lisa D'Amour's Detroit in 2014. Her work with the company has been nominated for three Barrymore Awards, winning once in 2005.

Mileaf previously served on the Theatre faculty of both Barnard College and the Columbia University School of the Arts. Additionally, she has been a guest artist at the Juilliard School and the Interlochen Center for the Arts.

== Personal life ==
Mileaf lives in New York City. She is married to the Obie Award-winning set designer Neil Patel, with whom she has two children.

== Theater directing credits ==
Year	Title	Playwright	Theatre
1990	The Crucible	Arthur Miller	Los Angeles Theatre Center
1992	Faith, Hope and Charity	Ödön von Horváth	San Diego Repertory Theatre
1993	The Gut Girls	Sarah Daniels	Cucaracha Theatre
1994	Scar	Caridad Svich	Perishable Theatre
1996	Missing/Kissing	John Patrick Shanley	Phoenix Theatre
1996	Tomorrowland	Neena Beber	New Georges & Soho Rep
1997	Laugh Till I Thought I'd Die	Jeannie Hutchins	PS 122
1998	How I Learned to Drive	Paula Vogel	Philadelphia Theatre Company
1998	Fire Eater	Brighde Mullins	Powerhouse Theater
1998	Art	Yasmina Reza	Bernard B. Jacobs Theatre
1999	Life Under 30	Various	Actors Theatre of Louisville
1999	The Beauty Queen of Leenane	Martin McDonagh	Philadelphia Theatre Company
1999	MAID	Erik Ehn	Lincoln Center Theater
1999	Art	Yasmina Reza	National Tour
1999	Lobster Alice	Kira Obolensky	Playwrights Horizons
2000	Hard Feelings	Neena Beber	Women's Project Theater
2000	Art	Yasmina Reza	The Kennedy Center
2000	Going to St. Ives	Lee Blessing	La Jolla Playhouse
2000	Wit	Margaret Edson	Philadelphia Theatre Company
2001	The Unexpected Man	Yasmina Reza	Geffen Playhouse
2002	99 Histories	Julia Cho	Cherry Lane Theatre
2003	Monsieur Ibrahim	Éric-Emmanuel Schmitt	The Play Company
2004	Private Jokes, Public Places	Oren Safdie	Center for Architecture
2004	Nickel and Dimed	Barbara Ehrenreich	Philadelphia Theatre Company
2004	Those Who Can, Do	Brighde Mullins	Clubbed Thumb
2004	Sakharam Binder	Vijay Tendulkar	The Play Company
2005	The Story	Tracey Scott Wilson	Philadelphia Theatre Company
2005	Going to St. Ives	Lee Blessing	Primary Stages
2005	The Argument	Alexandra Gersten-Vassilaros	Vineyard Theatre
2005	The Sugar Syndrome	Lucy Prebble	Williamstown Theatre Festival
2005	The 24 Hour Plays	Greg Kotis	American Airlines Theater
2006	Underneath the Lintel	Glen Berger	George Street Playhouse
2006	The Heidi Chronicles	Wendy Wasserstein	Berkshire Theatre Festival
2006	A Nervous Smile	John Belluso	Williamstown Theatre Festival
2007	Blithe Spirit	Noël Coward	Williamstown Theatre Festival
2007	Third	Wendy Wasserstein	Geffen Playhouse
2007	Underneath the Lintel	Glen Berger	Duchess Theatre
2008	A Perfect Couple	Brooke Berman	Daryl Roth Theatre
2008	A Body of Water	Lee Blessing	Primary Stages
2009	Blood from a Stoner	Jeanne Dorsey	Ensemble Studio Theatre
2009	Ninety	Joanna Murray-Smith	Powerhouse Theater
2010	MazelTov Cocktail	Jamie M. Fox	McGinn/Cazale Theatre
2011	F2M	Patricia Wettig	Powerhouse Theater
2011	Ruined	Lynn Nottage	Philadelphia Theatre Company
2012	Reasons to Be Pretty	Neil LaBute	Philadelphia Theatre Company
2013	The Rainmaker	N. Richard Nash	Old Globe Theatre
2013	The Great God Pan	Arthur Machen	The Juilliard School
2014	The Mulberry Bush	Neil LaBute	59E59 Theaters
2014	Detroit	Lisa D'Amour	Philadelphia Theatre Company
2015	Let There Be Love	Kwame Kwei-Armah	American Conservatory Theater
2015	HA	Dawn Akemi Saito	Dance Theater Workshop
2015	Abyss	Maria Milisavljevic	The Play Company
2016	After the Wedding	Neil LaBute	59E59 Theaters
2016	Feeding the Dragon	Sharon Washington	City Theatre
2017	Playing God	Alan Zweibel	59E59 Theaters
2018	Feeding the Dragon	Sharon Washington	Primary Stages
2018	Feeding the Dragon	Sharon Washington	Hartford Stage
2019	Gint	Henrik Ibsen & Romulus Linney	The Juilliard School
2019	Here I Lie	Courtney Baron	59E59 Theaters
2022	Gratitude	Oren Safdie	Urban Stages
2023	The Rembrandt	Jessica Dicky	TheaterWorks
2023	Let There Be Love	Kwame Kwei-Armah	Penguin Rep
2023	Awake in the Dark	Shira Nayman	The Flea Theater
2025	The American Dream	Juan Ramirez Jr.	Urban Stages
2025	A Mother	Neena Beber & Bertolt Brecht	Baryshnikov Arts Center
2026	The Heart Sellers	Lloyd Suh	Penguin Rep

== Awards and honors ==
Mileaf is the recipient of the Libby Zion Fellowship from Yale University, the Jonathan Alper Directing Fellowship from Manhattan Theatre Club, and the Boris Sagal and Bill Foeller Directing Fellowship from Williamstown Theatre Festival. She is an alumna of the Lincoln Center Director’s Lab, the WP Theater Director's Lab, and the Soho Rep Writer/Director's Lab. Additionally, Mileaf is a former Resident Director of New Dramatists.

Year	Associations	Category	Project	Result	Ref.
1998	Outer Critics Circle Award	Outstanding New Broadway Play	Art	Nominated	
1998	New York Drama Critics Circle Award	Best Play	Art	Won	
1998	Drama Desk Award	Outstanding Play	Art	Nominated	
1998	Tony Award	Best Play	Art	Won	
2000	Barrymore Award	Outstanding Direction of a Play	Wit	Nominated	
2000	Barrymore Award	Outstanding Production of a Play	Wit	Nominated	
2005	Barrymore Award	Outstanding Direction of a Play	The Story	Won	
2005	Lucille Lortel Award	Outstanding Play	Going to St. Ives	Nominated	
2005	Outer Critics Circle Award	Outstanding New Off-Broadway Play	Going to St. Ives	Won	
2008	WhatsOnStage Award	Best Solo Show	Underneath the Lintel	Nominated	
2018	Lucille Lortel Award	Outstanding Solo Show	Feeding the Dragon	Nominated	
2018	Outer Critics Circle Award	Outstanding Solo Show	Feeding the Dragon	Nominated	
