= The Gut Girls =

1988 play by Sarah Daniels

- Original language: English
- Written by: Sarah Daniels
- Characters: 6w, 2m
- Subject: Existentialism, marriage, memory
- Genre: Psychological drama

Premiere
- Date: November 2, 1988
- Place: Albany Theatre, London, U.K. Cucaracha Theatre; New York City, U.S.

The Gut Girls is a play by Sarah Daniels. Originally premiering at the Albany Theatre in London, on November 2, 1988, directed by Teddy Kiendl. The play had its U.S. premiere in June 1993 at the Cucaracha Theatre, Off-Broadway, directed by Maria Mileaf.

The Gut Girls later had an Off-West End revival in March 2014 at the Brockley Jack Theatre, directed by Amy Gunn. The play was licensed/published by Samuel French, Inc., and remains one of Daniels most produced plays globally.

== Characters ==
- Annie/Emily
- Ellen/Priscilla
- Harry/Arthur/Len/Mad Jacko
- Jim/Edwin
- Kate
- Lady Helena
- Maggie/Nora/Edna
- Polly/Eady

== Plot ==
Set in Deptford, London, at the turn of the twentieth century, The Gut Girls follows a group of working-class women employed in the gutting sheds of the local cattle market, where they endure long hours performing physically demanding and socially stigmatized labor. Despite the harsh and gruesome conditions, this works affords them women a degree of financial security and camaraderie unusual for women of their social class.

The arrival of a new, vulnerable recruit highlights the preciousness of their lives, while also reinforcing the bonds among the women, who share a culture of irreverence and mutual aid. Their relative autonomy, however, draws the attention of Lady Helena, an upper-class reformer who seeks to “improve” them by training the women for domestic service. Although presented as benevolent, her intention reflects prevailing social attitudes that view women's financial independence as improper, and their occupation as morally suspect.

As reforms efforts intensify, changes to regulations and negative public opinion lead to the closure of the gutting sheds, depriving the women of their livelihood. Forced into domestic service or other constrained roles, they experience a loss of independence and are scattered into unfamiliar and often exploitative environments. This transition exposes the hypocrisy of reformation, in which “respectable” work offers less autonomy than the women's former employment. The play concludes by contrasting the gut girls former solidarity and freedom with the new restrictive conditions imposed on them.

== Background ==
The Gut Girls was originally commissioned by Teddy Kiendl, then the artistic director of Albany Theatre in Deptford, to “draw working-class Londoners to theatre.” The guidelines Kiendl set down were to due tell the story of the trials of the Girls working in the gutting shed, and to the “philanthropic efforts” of the Duchess of Albany.

== Production history ==
=== Albany Theatre, London ===
The Gut Girls had its World Premiere at the Albany Theatre in Deptford, London, running from November 2 - December 3, 1988. Directed by Teddy Kiendl, the production featured Eve Bland, Joanna Mays, Cathy Shipton, Janet Steel, Gillian Wright, Claire Vousden, Graham Cull, and Peter Seton. The production was designed by Kate Owen.

=== Cucaracha Theatre, New York ===
The Gut Girls had its U.S. Premiere at Cucaracha Theatre, running Off-Broadway from June 3–28, 1993. Directed by Maria Mileaf, the production featured Joseph Fuqua, Pamela Gray, Lauren Hamilton, Deirdre Harrison, Kate Malin, Mollie O'Mara, Elizabeth Woodruff, and Damian Young. The creative team included Vincent Mountain (sets), Mary Larson (costumes), Jeremy Stein (lights), Eric Liljestrand (original music & sound), and Howard Samuelson (dialects).

=== Brockley Jack Theatre, London ===
The Gut Girls was revived in an Off West End production at the Brockley Jack Theatre in Lewisham, London, running from March 11 – 29, 2014. Directed by Amy Gunn, the production featured Hannah Wood, Beth Eyre, Luke Stevenson, Oliver Malam, Katherine Rodden, Gemma Paget, Lucy Caplin, and Billie Fulford-Brown. The creative team included Rachael Ryan (sets and costumes), Amy Mae (lights), Mark Webber (sound), Jennifer Jackson (choreography), and Ben Peterson (fight choreography).

== Reception ==
The play's various productions have received mostly positive reviews from critics, particularly for Blessing's script, McSweeney and Mileaf's direction, and the actors performances.

D. J. R. Bruckner, in a review for The New York Times, noted

"Sarah Daniels has gained notoriety in London as a playwright whose feminist voice and themes have aroused controversy among critics and audiences. The Gut Girls, the first of her works to be seen here, in a production by the Cucaracha Theatre under Maria Mileaf's direction, leaves one hoping Ms. Daniels will continue acquiring playwriting skills that are equal to her intelligence, her sense of humor and her eloquence... The great pleasure of the Cucaracha's production is the cast, especially Deirdre Harrison and Mollie O'Mara as two of the gut girls whose eccentric personalities are allowed to develop fully in the play; Lauren Hamilton, both as the most thoughtful and bitter of the gut girls and also as the abattoir owner's humiliated and battered wife, who slowly discovers her own worth; and Joseph Fuqua, as a butcher's assistant and as a corrupt nobleman who are so different in voice and appearance one questions the program's assertion that they are played by the same man."

Malcolm Hay of Time Out observed "Regarded as little better than whores by their contemporaries the gut girls are a boisterous, beer-swilling, strong-minded bunch, handy with a knife both in the gutting shed and outside it, defiantly independent in attitude and scornful of the illusion of male supremacy."

Howard Loxton of British Theatre Guide noted "This whole company makes an effective ensemble in a production played with an audience on three sides, often making entrances through them. Scenes move swiftly, their pattern established from the start with girls trundled around on the wheeled butcher’s block, with some tactful use of John Barber’s music to underscore some scenes."
