= Playing God (play) =

2017 one-act play by Alan Zweibel

- Playing on Air poster
- Written by: Alan Zweibel
- Subject: Medicine, God complex
- Genre: Comedy

Premiere
- Date premiered: July 21, 2017
- Place premiered: 59E59 Theaters, Off-Broadway

Playing God is a one-act play by American comedian Alan Zweibel. The play premiered Off-Broadway at 59E59 Theaters as part of their annual Summer Shorts Series, running from July 21 through September 2, 2017. Directed by Maria Mileaf, the cast featured Bill Buell, Flora Diaz, Dana Watkins, and Welker White. The production was named a "Critic's Pick" by The New York Times.

In 2018, Playing God was adapted as a radio play for Playing on Air. Directed by Fred Berner, the cast featured Scott Adsit, Emily Bergl, Bill Buell, and Susie Essman.

== Characters ==
- Dr. Fisher
- God
- God's assistant
- Barbara Graber

== Plot ==
Play God centers on Dr. Fisher, an OB-GYN who prioritizes his own convenience over his patient Barbara’s well-being by attempting to control the timing of her son’s birth. This cavalier misuse of medicine draws the attention of God, who, accompanied by his assistant, intervenes to confront the doctor’s “God complex.”

God challenges Fisher to a game of squash, using the encounter to expose the doctor’s arrogance and lack of ethical responsibility. As the interaction unfolds, Fisher's attitude is tested, and he is forced to face the consequences of his actions. The play concludes with a satirical examination of professional responsibility and the dangers of unchecked authority.

== Productions ==
=== 59E59 Theaters, Summer Shorts Series ===
Playing God premiered Off-Broadway at 59E59 Theaters as part of their annual Summer Shorts Series, running from July 21 through September 2, 2017. Directed by Maria Mileaf, the cast featured Bill Buell, Flora Diaz, Dana Watkins, and Welker White. The creative team included Rebecca Lord-Surratt (sets), Amy Sutton (costumes), Greg MacPherson (lighting), Nick Moore (original music & sound), and Elisabeth Orr (props).

=== Playing on Air ===
In 2018, Playing God was adapted as a radio play for Playing on Air. Directed by Fred Berner, the cast featured Scott Adsit, Emily Bergl, Bill Buell, and Susie Essman.

== Critical response ==
The play's Off-Broadway production received mostly positive reviews from critics, with particular praise for Zweibel's writing, Mileaf's direction, and the ensemble of actors. The production currently holds a score of 77% on the review aggregator website Show-Score.

Elisabeth Vincentelli in a review for The New York Times named the production a "Critic's Pick", writing

"Alan Zweibel supplies the sugary filling in the Series A sandwich with Playing God, a comic interlude in which the Supreme Being (Bill Buell) punishes a callow doctor (Dana Watkins) by taunting him into a game of squash. It may feel like an extended skit, but Mr. Zweibel — a member of the original “Saturday Night Live” writing team and the co-creator of “It’s Garry Shandling’s Show” — has a way with old-school one-liners. He also has a perfect accomplice in Mr. Buell: The actor’s face does not appear to move, his inflection does not really vary, and yet he somehow kills with every single line. Perhaps that is what God-given talent means."

Trade publication TheaterMania was equally enthusiastic, noting "The tone sharply shifts as we move into Zweibel's sketchlike comedy Playing God. Here we meet the pompous obstetrician Doctor Fisher (Dana Watkins putting on his best air of white privilege), who has the audacity to schedule his patients' deliveries around his vacation schedule. This makes God (a crotchety, white-robed Bill Buell) none too happy... Maria Mileaf directs the piece very tongue-in-cheek — as one would have to when you're staging a magical squash match between God and a hot doctor. Some of the silliness falls flat, but ultimately the play does raise some interesting questions about belief — or at the very least makes us reconsider Pascal's Wager."

In a more negative review, Helen Shaw of Time Out observed "Sadly, nothing could rescue Alan Zweibel’s Playing God. Annoyed that ob-gyn Steven (Dana Watkins) plans to induce a pregnancy to accommodate his vacation schedule, God (Bill Buell) proposes a Faustian squash game. There’s a gag about Boca Raton and a two-decades-late punch line about The Karate Kid’s Mr. Miyagi. Despite a lazy Trump joke, the sketch seems to have been dusted off after years in the drawer. Back it goes."
