= Cucaracha Theatre =

American Off-Broadway theater company

- Formation: September 20, 1985
- Dissolved: February 21, 1999
- Type: Theatre group
- Purpose: Avant-garde theatre
- Location(s): 500 Greenwich St, New York, NY 10013
- Artistic director: Richard Caliban
- Award: Obie Award

Cucaracha Theatre (also known as Cucaracha Warehouse Theatre) was an Obie Award-winning experimental Off-Broadway theatre company founded in September of 1985 by Richard Caliban and David Simonds. Based in New York City, the company produced original and reimagined works until 1999. It was once described by The New York Times as “the most exciting experimental theater company in New York.”

At the height of its activity, the company operated its own performance space in a 10,000-square-foot warehouse in TriBeCa. After losing this space during the early 1990s recession, the company continued its work at The Public Theater and elsewhere.

== History ==
Cucaracha Theatre was founded in September of 1985 by Richard Caliban, a playwright and director, and David Simonds, an actor. According to a profile in a 1992 issue of BOMB Magazine, the company's first production, Caliban's Internal Combustion, went up with a $1,500 budget and broke even the first night. That production spawned the ensemble company, Cucaracha Theatre. Within their first four seasons, the company presented some 40 works, featuring a total of more than 100 actors. By 1989, Cucaracha Theatre had won an Obie Award, and gained a reputation as a critical darling of New York City's Downtown Arts Scene, known for their "sprawling ensemble pieces" with an "intense, homemade quality."

At its height, Cucaracha Theatre operated its own venue, known as the Cucaracha Warehouse Theatre, in TriBeCa. After losing this space during the early 1990s recession, the company continued presenting work in various rental venues, as well as in co-productions with The Public Theater, Classic Stage Company, Soho Rep, and others. The company’s final production was Birth Rite, a one-woman show written and performed by Elizabeth Hess, was presented at the Harold Clurman Theatre from February 4 to 21, 1999. The play tells the story of a "young Mennonite woman who struggles to escape the bonds of her suppressive religion."

Archival materials related to Cucaracha Theatre, including newspaper clippings, flyers, postcards, and various documents chronicling the company's history and productions are housed at the New York Public Library. Noteworthy artists who worked with Cucaracha Theatre included Rachel Bay Jones, Geneva Carr, Mac Wellman, Annie-B Parson, Paul Lazar, Leslie Nipkow, Joseph Fuqua, Pamela Gray, Sarah Lambert, Damian Young, Lia Chang, Anna Kohler, Chris McNally, Irma St. Paule, Michael Della Femina, Jodie Markell, Rebecca Wisocky, Sarah Daniels, and Maria Mileaf.

== Notable productions ==
=== Indiana Dog by Jeffrey Klayman ===
Cucaracha Theatre produced Indiana Dog by Jeffrey Klayman from September 13 through October 14, 1989, at its TriBeCa warehouse space. Directed by Mervyn Willis and featuring a large ensemble cast, the production was described as a “Peer Gynt-style epic” in The New York Times.

=== Tiny Dimes by Peter Mattei ===
In March of 1990, Cucaracha Theatre produced Tiny Dimes, written and directed by Peter Mattei, a "boardroom-style battle for supremacy, conducted by two married couples and an executive who may or may not all be involved in the same business." The cast included Joey L. Golden, Lauren Hamilton, Hugh Palmer, Elizabeth Thompson, Damian Young, and Brennan Murphy. The creative team included Brian Aldous (lighting) Mary Myers (costumes), and Allison McElwain (assistant director). In a review for The New York Times, Drama critic Mel Gussow wrote that the play had "sporadically amusing moments of absurdism" but was at times "static as well as uncommunicative."

=== Rodents and Radios by Richard Caliban ===
In April of 1990, Cucaracha Theatre produced Rodents and Radios, written and directed by Richard Caliban. The cast included Damian Young, Sharon Brady, Mollie O'Mara, Glen M. Santiago, Lauren Hamilton, Mark Dillahunt, Vivian Lanko, Christine Deily, and Joey L. Golden. The creative team included Brian Aldous (lighting) Mary Myers (costumes), and John Hoge (sound and original music). In a review for The New York Times, Drama critic Mel Gussow noted "With the help of a background score (written and played by John Hoge) and a committed cast, Mr. Caliban has staged his play with fluidity."

=== Famine Plays by Richard Caliban ===
In November of 1990, Cucaracha Theatre remounted Famine Plays, written and directed by Richard Caliban. The cast included Steven Bland, Lia Chang, Mark Dillahunt, Corinne Edgerly, Lauren Hamilton, Vivian Lanko, Mollie O'Mara, Brennan Murphy, Hugh Palmer, Glen Santiago, David Simonds and George Tynan. The creative team included John Hoge (music), Brian Aldous (lighting) Mary Myers (costumes), John Huntington (sound), Tony Jacobs (projections), J. Tori Evand (Assistant Director), Daniel Tharau (stage manager), and Janet Paparazzo (production manager). In a review for The New York Times, Drama critic Mel Gussow noted "As the characters crisscross the stage, they become routeless. None has a sense of destination, and, in an odd, ironic note, neither does the play. It wanders prodigally on Mr. Caliban's endless road, moves past several possible exits and never quite arrives at a conclusion."

=== Amerikamachine by Peter Mattei ===
In May of 1991, Cucaracha Theatre produced Amerikamachine, a political comedy written and directed by Peter Mattei, inspired by the events of the Persian Gulf war. Divided into twenty non-linear scenes, the play is set in a post-apocalyptic United States known as "Planet Amerika." The cast included Garrick Ambrose, Les Baum, Joey L. Golden, Damon Grant, Lauren Hamilton, Kirk Jackson, Christie MacFadyen, Freja Mitchell, Brennan Murphy, Glen M. Santiago, David Simonds, Elizabeth Woodruff, and Damian Young. The creative team included Peter Mattei (sets), Brian Aldous (lighting), Mary Myers (costumes), Jeffrey Taylor (sound), and Pam Thompson (stage manager). In a review for The New York Times, Drama critic Stephen Holden noted "If the density of the play's allusions, which jam together Shakespeare, Georg Buchner, Heiner Muller, Allen Ginsberg and others, is intimidating, the production has been directed by Mr. Mattei and performed in Cucaracha's drab East Second Street headquarters with an electrifying energy."

=== The Two Gentlemen of Verona by Williams Shakespeare ===
In December of 1991, Cucaracha Theatre produced a new adaptation of William Shakespeare's The Two Gentlemen of Verona, co-written and directed by Mark Milbauer and David Becker, in a co-production with Soho Rep. Re-imagined as a "brutual satire of sexism in society," Milbauer and Becker's adaptation attempts to reconcile the original play's treatment of Sylvia. The cast included Les Baum, Lia Chang, Mark Dillahunt, Joseph Fuqua, Joey L. Golden, Vivian Lanko, Julie Moses, Hugh Palmer, and Damian Young. The creative team included Sarah Lambert (sets), Brian Scott Zielinski (lighting), Melina Root (costumes), David Becker (sound and original music). In a review for The New York Times, Drama critic Stephen Holden noted "All the performances are good, with Ms. Lanko's brooding Sylvia and Joey L. Golden's reptilian Proteus outstanding. If this interpretation of "Two Gentlemen of Verona" sacrifices much of Shakespeare's humor, it solves the play by placing it in a world where every cry of date rape is met with a conspiratorial closing of the male ranks."

=== Homo Sapien Shuffle by Richard Caliban ===
In March of 1992, Cucaracha Theatre produced Homo Sapien Shuffle, written and directed by Richard Caliban, in a co-production with The Public Theater. The cast included Vivian Lanko, Mark Dillahunt, Martin Donovan, Sharon Brady, Lauren Hamilton, Glen M. Santiago, and Mollie O'Mara. The creative team included John Hoge (original music), Kyle Chepulis (sets), Yvette Helin (puppets and costumes), Brian Aldous (lights), and John Huntington (sound). In a review for The New York Times, Drama critic Mel Gussow noted "What holds one's attention more than the interwoven stories is the manner of the storytelling. Adapting high-tech ideas from movies and television, Mr. Caliban as director creates rhythmic patterns of overlapping scenes. Sleekly sliding platforms glide by on tracks. The effect is like that in a Hitchcock film, in which a passenger on one train may glimpse a strange event through the window of a passing car."

=== The Gut Girls by Sarah Daniels ===
In June of 1993, Cucaracha Theatre produced the U.S. premiere of The Gut Girls by Sarah Daniels, following its acclaimed run at the Albany Theatre in London. Directed by Maria Mileaf, the cast featured Joseph Fuqua, Pamela Gray, Lauren Hamilton, Deirdre Harrison, Kate Malin, Mollie O'Mara, Elizabeth Woodruff, and Damian Young. The creative team included Vincent Mountain (sets), Mary Larson (costumes), Jeremy Stein (lights), Eric Liljestrand (sound and original music), and Howard Samuelson (dialects). Set in Deptford at the turn of the 20th century, The Gut Girls traces the lives of the young women and girls who work in the gutting sheds of the Cattle Market and how their lives are changed when the sheds are closed down. In a review for The New York Times, Drama critic D. J. R. Bruckner wrote "Sarah Daniels has gained notoriety in London as a playwright whose feminist voice and themes have aroused controversy among critics and audiences. "The Gut Girls," the first of her works to be seen here, in a production by the Cucaracha Theatre under Maria Mileaf's direction, leaves one hoping Ms. Daniels will acquire playwriting skills that are equal to her intelligence, her sense of humor and her eloquence."

=== Bremen Freedom by Rainer Werner Fassbinder ===
In November of 1993, Cucaracha Theatre produced Bremen Freedom by Rainer Werner Fassbinder in a co-production with Big Dance Theater. Co-directed by Annie-B Parson and Paul Lazar, the cast featured Stephen Brantley, Stacy Dawson, Joey Golden, Deirdre Harrison, Kirk Jackson, Ilyana Kadushin, Susan Maginn, Kate Malin, Brennan Murphy, and Rebecca Wisocky. The creative team included Stephen Osgood (composer & music director), Joanne Howard (sets), Claudia Stephen (costumes), David Moodey (lights), and Robert Leone (sound). The play is a dark comedy about Geesche Gottfried, a 19th century german women who defies religious and patriarchal convention to run her own business. Refusing to be controlled, on more than one occasion Geesche murders the men around her with arsenic laced butter. In Cucaracha Theatre's expressionist adaptation, Geesche was portrayed by five different actresses. In a review for The New York Times, Drama critic Stephen Holden wrote "In the play's austere, strikingly choreographed production directed by Paul Lazar and Annie-B Parson, Geesche emerges as a Brechtian figure as towering and indomitable as Mother Courage. The production's mechanized choreography sharply satirizes the accepted social roles for women as slaves, angels and receptacles."

=== Don Juan Comes Back From the War by Odon von Horvath ===
In April of 1996, Cucaracha Theatre produced Don Juan Comes Back from the War by Ödön von Horváth in a co-production with Classic Stage Company. Co-directed by Annie-B Parson and Paul Lazar, the cast featured Katya Bruce, Stacy Dawson, Lauren Hamilton, Diedre Harrison, Molly Kickok, Anna Kohler, Chris McNally, Gwen Snyder, Irma St. Paule, Stephanie Weyman, and Rebecca Wisocky. The creative team included Christopher Berg (music director), Joanne Howard (sets), Claudia Stephens (costumes), David Moodey (lights), and Robert Leone (sound). The play reimagines the legendary lover Don Juan as a soldier returning from World War I, disoriented and seeking his lost love, only to find a changed world and a series of women who fall short of his ideal, leading to a tragic end. In a review for The New York Times, Drama critic D. J. R. Bruckner wrote "For all its brevity (this version is about 90 minutes), the play is epic in structure, and in its reach. Here a disciplined cast -- a man and 10 women who share scores of roles -- moves so easily, and enjoyably, through its many turns that at the end one is a little astonished to realize how complex the story is."

=== Clash by Night by Clifford Odets ===
In February of 1996, Cucaracha Theatre produced a revival of Clashed by Night by Clifford Odets in a co-production with All Seasons Theater Group. Directed by Richard Caliban, the cast featured Jodie Markell as Mae Wilenski, Michael Della Femina as Jerry Wilenski, Dominic Comperatore as Joe W. Doyle, and Geneva Carr as Peggy Coffey. The creative team included George Xenos (sets), Meg Neville (costumes), Greg MacPherson (lights), and Michael Messer (sound). In a review for The New York Times, Drama critic Peter Marks wrote "The revival, directed by Richard Caliban, returns the play to its more credible roots, Staten Island just before the American entry into World War II. Mr. Caliban understands that this is, more than anything else, a period piece, the period marking the growing power and prominence of the blue-collar class."

=== Birth Rite by Elisabeth Hess ===
Cucaracha Theatre presented their final production, a one woman show by Elizabeth Hess entitled Birth Rite at the Harold Clurman Theater from February 4 through 21, 1999. The autobiographic drama is about a "young Mennonite woman who struggles to escape the bonds of her suppressive religion." Written and performed by Hess and directed by Richard Caliban, the creative team included Marc R. Aubin (sets & costumes), Greg MacPherson (lights) and Robert Gould (sound). In a review for The New York Times, Drama critic D. J. R. Bruckner wrote "Birth Rite, a one-woman show performed by Ms. Hess, is not a grim play. It is an enchanting evocation of a life, presented as autobiography, from early childhood to a successful acting career. The transformation is wonderful to behold -- in fact, Ms. Hess draws you so deeply into the experience you leave convinced you shared it. And the story is often very funny."
