= The Story (stage play) =

2003 play by Tracey Scott Wilson

- Off-West End promotional poster
- Original language: English
- Written by: Tracey Scott Wilson
- Characters: Detective; Jeff; Jessica; Latisha; Neil; Pat; Tim; Yvonne; Carla; Reporter
- Subject: Journalism, race relations, moral conflict
- Genre: Drama
- Setting: United States

Premiere
- Date: November 18, 2003
- Place: The Public Theater

The Story is a play by Tracey Scott Wilson. Originally premiering at The Public Theater in New York City, on November 18, 2003. Directed by Loretta Greco, the production featured Phylicia Rashad, Erika Alexander, Stephen Kunken, Damon Gupton, Sarah Grace Wilson, Michelle Hurst, Kalimi Baxter, Susan Kelechi Watson, and Tammi Clayton. The play was a finalist for the 2002 Susan Smith Blackburn Prize.

The Story was subsequently produced by numerous regional theaters in the United States, including Long Wharf Theater, Philadelphia Theatre Company, Goodman Theatre, Boston Center for the Arts, and San Francisco Playhouse. In the UK, the play made its West End debut in August 2026 at the Royal National Theatre, directed by Clint Dyer, with the cast including BAFTA Award-winner Letitia Wright, Ashley Thomas, Lorraine Toussaint, and Wilf Scolding.

The Story is inspired by the Janet Cooke scandal at The Washington Post in 1981 where Cooke won the Pulitzer Prize for writing about an inner-city child, Jimmy, only to later admit that the story was fraudulent.

== Characters ==
- Yvonne
- Latisha
- Neil
- Jeff
- Jessica
- Pat
- Tim
- Carla
- Detective
- Reporter
- Ensemble

== Plot ==
The play follows Yvonne, an ambitious African-American journalist newly assigned to the "Outlook" section of a major metropolitan newspaper. Eager to advance her career, Yvonne becomes frustrated with the marginal status of her beat and seeks a story that will elevate her to the front page. Despite trepidation from her editor, Pat—a veteran reporter who has fought to establish credibility and integrity at their publication—Yvonne pursues a sensational murder case involving a white schoolteacher. Struggling to gain access and recognition, she ultimately fabricates key elements of the story, inventing a young Black girl, Latisha, and attributing to her a confession that links her to the crime.

Yvonne's article garners widespread public attention and professional acclaim, propelling her into prominence within the paper. However, as inconsistencies begin to emerge, the truth behind her story unravels. Her deception places her colleagues, including her friend Neil and her boyfriend Jeff, under scrutiny, exposing underlying tensions surrounding race, ambition, and journalistic responsibility. Once her fabrication becomes public knowledge, Yvonne faces the collapse of her career and reputation. The play concludes by foregrounding the ethical ramifications of her actions and the broader implications of truth, representations, and power in media.

== Production history ==
=== The Public Theater, Off-Broadway ===
The Story had its world premiere at The Public Theater in New York City, running from November 18, 2003, through January 2004. Directed by Loretta Greco, the production featured Phylicia Rashad, Erika Alexander, Stephen Kunken, Damon Gupton, Sarah Grace Wilson, Michelle Hurst, Kalimi Baxter, Susan Kelechi Watson, and Tammi Clayton. The creative team included Robert Brill (sets), Emilio Sosa (costumes), James Vermeulen (lighting), and Robert Kaplowitz (sound).

Rashad was nominated for the Drama League Award for Distinguished Performance, while Kaplowitz was nominated for the Lucille Lortel Award for Outstanding Sound Design.

=== Long Wharf Theater, New Haven ===
The Story had its regional premiere at Long Wharf Theatre in New Haven, CT, running from February 4 through March 14, 2004. Directed by Loretta Greco, the production featured Lizzy Cooper Davis, Kalimi Baxter, Tammi Clayton, Duane Boutté, Michelle Hurst, David Wilson Barnes, Sharon Washington, Christen Simon, and Sarah Grace Wilson. The creative team included Robert Brill (sets), Emilio Sosa (costumes), James Vermeulen (lighting), and Robert Kaplowitz (sound).

=== Philadelphia Theatre Company ===
The Story was produced by Philadelphia Theatre Company in Philadelphia, PA, running from January 28 through February 27, 2005. Directed by Maria Mileaf, the production featured Kala Moses Baxter, Kenajuan Bentley, Brienin Bryant, Danai Gurira, Miriam A. Hyman, Pamela Isaacs, Christine Long, Michael Polak, and Karen Vicks. The creative team included Neil Patel (sets), Janus Stefanowicz (costumes), Russell H. Champa (lighting), and Eileen Tague (sound).

For her direction, Mileaf won the 2005 Barrymore Award for Outstanding Direction.

=== Goodman Theatre, Chicago ===
The Story was produced by Goodman Theatre in Chicago, IL, running from March 5 through April 10, 2005. Directed by Chuck Smith, the production featured Kati Brazda, Monét Butler, Josh Bywater, Lizzy Cooper Davis, Tonya Latrice, Kevin McKillip, Patrick Sims, Penelope Walker, Alma Washington, and Jacqueline Williams. The creative team included Todd Rosenthal (sets), Birgit Rattenborg Wise (costumes), Robert Christen (lighting), and Ray Nardelli (original music & sound).

=== Boston Center for the Arts ===
The Story was produced by Zeitgeist Stage Company at Boston Center for the Arts in Boston, MA, running from September 2 through 24, 2005. Directed by David J. Miller, the production featured Kortney Adams, Chantel Bibb, Nydia Calón, Michelle Dowd, Gabriel Field, Caryn Andrea Lindsey, Yvonne Murphy, Kalli Turner, and Keedar Whittle. The creative team included David J. Miller (sets), Tracy Campbell (costumes), Darren Evans (lighting), and Walter Eduardo (sound).

For their performances, Bibb was nominated for the 2006 IRNE Award for Best Actress, while Dowd won Best Supporting Actress.

=== San Francisco Playhouse ===
The Story had its West Coast premiere at the San Francisco Playhouse in San Francisco, CA, running from March 18 through April 25, 2009. Directed by Margo Hall, the production featured Afi Ayanna, Dwight Huntsman, Halili Knox, Awele Makeba, Craig Marker, Allison Payne, Ryan Nicole Peters, Rebecca Schweitzer, Kathryn Tkel.

This production was nominated for three Bay Area Theatre Critics Circle Awards, including Best Ensemble, Best Director (for Hall) and Best Supporting Actor (for Marker).

=== National Theatre, London ===
The Story made its UK debut at the Royal National Theatre between August 27 and October 24, 2026. Directed by award-winning writer/director Clint Dyer (of Death of England fame), the cast includes BAFTA Award-winner Letitia Wright, Ashley Thomas, Lorraine Toussaint, and Wilf Scolding, and like all National Theatre productions, will be filmed for later release on their streaming service.

== Reception ==
The play's Off-Broadway run received critical acclaim, with particular praise for Wilson's writing, Greco's direction, and the ensemble of actors.

Bruce Weber of The New York Times praised the production, writing,

"Journalism has had a rough time of it lately, and The Story, a conscientious and absorbing new drama by Tracey Scott Wilson, feels almost like a year-end review of the profession's troubles. The play, at the Joseph Papp Public Theater, explores newsroom politics, race relations and personal ambition at a fictional metropolitan daily newspaper and offers a close-to-credible scenario for how one reckless reporter can unmoor an entire institution."

Trade publication TheaterMania was also positive in their assessment, writing "Stylishly directed by Loretta Greco, the play often has two scenes unfolding at the same time, like two songs sung in counterpoint. This device drives home the fact that stories often have more than one side. Robert Brill’s set design is purposefully simple and fluid; James Vermeulen’s lighting helps to firmly establish the outlines of the different playing areas whenever two scenes are happening at the same time."

The New Yorker praised Wilson as "A singular new voice, deeply emotional, deeply intellectual, and deeply musical." While the Associated Press called the play "A riveting, tough-minded drama about race, reporting and the truth."

Charles Isherwood of Variety offered a more mixed take, noting: "Slick, smart and engrossing, this new play by Tracey Scott Wilson crackles along briskly before running aground in the final minutes, when it seems to run out of, well, story. Drawing on various real-life tales of urban crime, ethics and racial politics in the newsroom, Wilson has done a clever cut-and-paste job that results in a surprisingly fresh and pointed play. A propulsive, skillfully acted production from Loretta Greco adds a further layer of polish."

== Awards ==
Year	Association	Category	Recipient	Result	Ref.
2002	Susan Smith Blackburn Prize	Drama	Tracey Scott Wilson	Nominated	
2004	Drama League Award	Distinguished Performance	Phylicia Rashad	Nominated	
2004	Lucille Lortel Award	Outstanding Sound Design	Robert Kaplowitz	Nominated	
2005	Barrymore Award	Outstanding Direction	Maria Mileaf	Won	
2006	IRNE Award	Best Actress	Chantel Bibb	Nominated	
2006	IRNE Award	Best Supporting Actress	Michelle Dowd	Won	
2009	Bay Area Theatre Critics Circle Award	Director	Margo Hall	Nominated	
2009	Bay Area Theatre Critics Circle Award	Ensemble	San Francisco Playhouse	Nominated	
2009	Bay Area Theatre Critics Circle Award	Supporting Performance, Male	Craig Marker	Nominated	
