= A Body of Water =

2005 play by Lee Blessing

- Off-Broadway promotional poster
- Original language: English
- Written by: Lee Blessing
- Characters: Avis; Moss; Wren
- Subject: Existentialism, marriage, memory
- Genre: Psychological drama

Premiere
- Date: July 15, 2005
- Place: The Guthrie Theater, Minneapolis

A Body of Water is a play by Lee Blessing. Originally premiering at The Guthrie Theater in Minneapolis, on July 15, 2005. Directed by Ethan McSweeny, the production featured Michael Learned, Edward Herrmann, and Michelle O'Neill. In February 2006, the play was subsequently produced by The Old Globe in San Diego, CA. Directed by McSweeney, the production featured Sandy Duncan, Ned Schmidtke, and Samantha Soule.

A Body of Water made its Off-Broadway at Primary Stages in September 2008. Directed by Maria Mileaf, the production featured Christine Lahti, Michael Cristofer, and Laura Odeh. The play won the Harold and Mimi Steinberg/ATCA New Play Award.

== Characters ==
- Avis
- Moss
- Wren

== Plot ==
Avis and Moss, a middle aged couple, wake up in an isolated summer house overlooking a large body of water, with no memory of who they are or how they arrived there. As they attempt to reconstruct their identities, they speculate about their relationship to one another, inventing and revising possible pasts that range from ordinary domestic life to darker, more sinister scenarios.

Their fragile attempts at self-definition are disrupted by the arrival of a young woman named Wren, who claims to know each of them. Wren provides a series of explanations about their identities and mysterious circumstances, but her accounts are inconsistent and often contradictory, ultimately raising more questions than answers. As Avis and Moss struggle to determine with stories, if any, are true, they become both increasingly dependent on Wren and increasingly suspicious of her motives.

Over the course of the play, shifting narratives bur the lines between reality and fabrication. Avis and Moss repeatedly recalibrate their understanding of themselves and each other, confronting unsettling possibilities about their past actions and moral character. Their lack of identity and unstable memories become increasingly fragile, as the revelation of each new “truth” undermines the last. Ultimately, the play offers no definitive resolution, leaving the characters (and the audience) uncertain of what is “real.” The story concludes with Avis and Moss trapped in a cycle of doubt, suggesting that human identity may be constructed as much through storytelling as through “objective fact.”

== Production history ==
=== The Guthrie Theater, Minneapolis ===
A Body of Water had its world premiere at The Guthrie Theater in Minneapolis, Minnesota, running from June 11 – July 3, 2005. Directed by Ethan McSweeny, the production featured Michael Learned, Edward Herrmann, and Michelle O'Neill. The creative team included Michael Vaughn Sims (sets), Rich Hamson (costumes), Matthew Reinert (lighting) and Michael Roth (original music and sound).

=== The Old Globe, San Diego ===
A Body of Water was produced by The Old Globe in San Diego, California, running from February 11 - March 19, 2006. Directed by Ethan McSweeny, the production featured Sandy Duncan, Ned Schmidtke, and Samantha Soule. The creative team included Michael Vaughn Sims (sets), Charlotte Devaux (costumes), York Kennedy (lighting) and Michael Roth (original music and sound).

=== Primary Stages, Off-Broadway ===
A Body of Water made its Off-Broadway premiere with Primary Stages at 59E59 Theaters, running from September 30 – November 9, 2008. Directed by Maria Mileaf, the production featured Christine Lahti, Michael Cristofer, and Laura Odeh. The creative team included Neil Patel (sets), Candice Donnelly (costumes), Jeff Croiter (lighting), and Bart Fasbender (original music and sound).

== Reception ==
The play's various productions have received mostly positive reviews from critics, particularly for Blessing's script, McSweeney and Mileaf's direction, and the actors performances.

Peter Ritter of Variety praised the play, writing,

"In Lee Blessing's new drama a middle-aged man and woman awake one morning to find themselves in an unfamiliar house on a mountain surrounded by water. Blessing uses this lonely island aerie as the central metaphor in a quietly unsettling existential mystery... A Body of Water is, obviously, a play rich in ideas about memory, identity and fiction. The three are bound in a Gordian knot, it turns out: Without the reference points of memory, identity is a fiction, yet memory itself is nothing more than a story we tell about the past. If Blessing doesn’t develop all these ideas as fully as he might, he does lay a rich philosophical groundwork for the play’s intrigue."

Philip Brandes of The Los Angeles Times offered positive sentiments, noting "Blessing’s new ending adds startling dramatic momentum to the abstract metaphysical contemplation... There’s certainly enough upheaval these days to make audiences relate to the heightened sense of untethered reality in A Body of Water... The play ultimately begets more questions than answers, leaving it up to each viewer to decide whether possessing a stable identity is a curse or a blessing."

In a more negative review, Charles Isherwood of The New York Times criticized the script, writing, "Midway through “A Body of Water,” a puzzle play by Lee Blessing that opened on Tuesday night at 59E59 Theaters, you may conclude that it would be better for all if Mr. Blessing just shoveled the pieces back in the box and returned it to the game closet. This sputtering drama about a man and a woman who wake up one day with matching cases of amnesia is ultimately so, er, forgettable that its resolution ceases to be a matter of suspense long before it arrives."

== Awards ==
Year	Association	Award	Recipient	Result	Ref.
2006	American Theatre Critics Association	Harold and Mimi Steinberg/ATCA New Play Award	Lee Blessing	Won	
2007	Craig Noel Awards	Outstanding Dramatic Production	The Old Globe	Won	
2007	Craig Noel Awards	Outstanding Direction of a Play	Ethan McSweeny	Won	
2007	Craig Noel Awards	Outstanding Ensemble	Sandy Duncan, Ned Schmidtke, & Samantha Soule	Won	
