= The Argument (2005 play) =

2005 play by Alexandra Gersten-Vassilaros

- Off-Broadway promotional poster
- Original language: English
- Written by: Alexandra Gersten-Vassilaros
- Characters: Sophie; Phillip; Herb
- Subject: Abortion, marriage, family
- Genre: Dramatic comedy

Premiere
- Date: May 11, 2005
- Place: Vineyard Theatre, New York City

The Argument is a play by Alexandra Gersten-Vassilaros. Originally premiering Off-Broadway at Vineyard Theatre in New York City, on May 11, 2005. Directed by Maria Mileaf, the production featured Academy Award-winner Melissa Leo, John Rothman, and Jay O. Sanders.

A revised version of the play premiered at Theater J in Washington D.C. in October 2013 to widespread critical acclaim. The play has since been published/licensed by Samuel French, Inc.

== Characters ==
- Sophie
- Phillip
- Herb

== Plot ==
The Argument begins with Sophie, an independent artists in her early forties, meeting Philip, a successful financier nearing fifty. The pair quickly fall into an intense romance, and after only a few months of dating, decide to move in together. Their burgeoning relationship is destabilized when Sophie discovers she is unexpectedly pregnant. The news thrust the couple in a profound, and increasingly heated conflict. Sophie, valuing her autonomy and while simultaneously feeling uncertain about motherhood at this stage in her life, wishes to terminate the pregnancy. Philip, however newly committed to the idea of fatherhood, insists own keeping the child.

What follows in an extended and escalating argument in which both parties attempt to reconcile their opposing desires while preserving their relationship. Their discussion move from reasoned debate to explosive turmoil, exposing deeper incompatibilities, personal fears, and differing visions for their shared future. Attempts at compromise, including enlisting a therapist named Herb, fail to resolve matters. As the conflict intensifies, the couple's relationship deteriorates, as the argument becomes less about pregnancy and more about control. The play ends ambiguously, leaving the ultimate outcome of both the pregnancy and the relationship unresolved, while emphasizing their irreconcilable nature of their disagreement.

== Production history ==
=== Vineyard Theatre ===
The Argument had its World Premiere at Vineyard Theatre in New York City, running Off-Broadway from May 11 through June 19, 2005. Directed by Maria Mileaf, the production featured Academy Award-winner Melissa Leo, John Rothman, and Jay O. Sanders. The creative team included Neil Patel (sets), Katherine Roth (costumes), David Lander (lights), and Obadiah Eaves (original music & sound).

=== Theater J ===
A new version of The Argument later premiered at Theater J in Washington, D.C., running from October 23 through November 24, 2013. Directed by Shirley Serotsky, the production featured Susan Rome, James Whalen, and Jefferson A. Russell. The creative team included Robbie Hayes (sets), Erin Nugent (costumes), Martha Mountain (lights), and Eric Shimelonis (original music & sound).

== Reception ==
The play's Off-Broadway production received polarized reactions. The new version of the play, presented at Theater J in 2013, received widespread critical acclaim, particularly for Gersten-Vassilaros's script, Serotsky's direction, and the actors performances.

Peter Ritter of Variety offered positive sentiments, writing,

"For something so light on content and devoid of action, this character-driven play delivers beaucoup drama in the conflict department. As title says, focus of talky but intelligent piece is an argument—and it's a doozy—between a man and a woman deeply committed to their loving relationship but just as deeply divided over the abortion that she wants and he adamantly does not... Melissa Leo and Jay O. Sanders handle the pair with real tenderness in Maria Mileaf’s well-pitched production. The savvy designers use a light touch to show the funny little ways in which the couple’s lives become increasingly entwined. Right up to the time that they go into couples counseling — in a hilarious but poignant scene in which they steamroll over John Rothman as their hapless counselor — you really think these two are going to make it."

Nelson Pressley of The Washington Post praised the play, noting "The Argument, which premiered in 2005 and has been revised for this new production at Theater J, opens not with a pronouncement, but with a man and a woman bursting into an apartment, where they proceed, very entertainingly, to rip each other’s clothes off. Over the swift 90-minute show’s first half-hour, 10 months pass in the lives of Sophie, a 42-year-old artist, and Phillip, a 49-year-old Wall Streeter. They talk. They fall in love. They set up house in Phillip’s Manhattan apartment, bonding over a big new refrigerator. We like them both. This low-key stretch is managed with a savvy eye by director Shirley Serotsky. It’s unpressured and genuine, which seems pivotal to Gersten-Vassilaros."

In a more negative review, Charles Isherwood of The New York Times criticized the script, writing, "This at least can be said of "The Argument," a new play by Alexandra Gersten-Vassilaros that opened at the Vineyard Theatre last night. It does not fail to deliver on the promise of its title. Watching this 90-minute bout is like sitting down to dinner next to a couple who derive erotic pleasure from airing disputes in public, an experience visited upon almost every urban dweller at one time or another. Ms. Gersten-Vassilaros, who with Theresa Rebeck wrote the post-9/11 play "Omnium Gatherum," aims to personalize another hot-button issue here, but it's not likely that any serious thought, old or new, is going to be provoked by this whiny debate between two uninteresting types about the ever-sensitive topic of abortion."
