= Going to St. Ives =

1997 play by Lee Blessing

- Off-Broadway promotional poster
- Original language: English
- Written by: Lee Blessing
- Characters: May N'Kame; Dr. Cora Gage
- Subject: Political violence, colonialism, moral conflict, motherhood
- Genre: Psychological drama
- Setting: St Ives, Cornwall

Premiere
- Date: July 3, 1997
- Place: ACT Theatre, Seattle

Going to St. Ives is a play by Lee Blessing. Originally premiering at ACT Theatre in Seattle, WA, on July 8, 1997. Directed by Leslie Swackhamer, the production featured Mari Nelson and Gloria Foster. In September 2000, the play was subsequently produced by La Jolla Playhouse in San Diego, CA. Directed by Maria Mileaf, the production featured Amy Morton and L. Scott Caldwell.

Going to St. Ives made its Off-Broadway debut at Primary Stages in March 2005. Directed by Maria Mileaf, the production featured Vivienne Benesch and L. Scott Caldwell. Benesch and Caldwell both received the Obie Award for Distinguished Performance by an Actress for their respective performances. The production also won the Outer Critics Circle Award for Outstanding New Off-Broadway Play, and was nominated for the Lucille Lortel Award for Outstanding Play.

== Characters ==
- May N’Kame, the mother of an African dictator
- Dr. Cora Cage, an eminent British ophthalmologist

== Plot ==
May N’Kame, the mother of a dictator from an unnamed African country travels to England to seek treatment for her failing eyesight from Dr. Cora Gage, a renowned ophthalmologist. During their initial meeting, Cora appeals to Ma to use her political influence to release several imprisoned doctors in her son's regime. May however, reveals her ulterior motive for going to St.Ives: she wished to obtain poison for Cora in order to assassinate her son and end his dictatorship. The request places Cora in an immense moral dilemma, challenging her oath as a physician to “do no harm” and her personal beliefs about justice. As the two women debate their opposing positions, they discover parallels in their lives, particularly as mothers who have each lost children. Over the course of the play, the relationship between May and Cora evolves from cautious negotiation to uneasy collaboration. In the second act, set in Africa several months later, the consequences of their decisions become apparent, forcing both women to confront the fall out of their actions.

== Production history ==
=== ACT Theatre, Seattle ===
Going to St. Ives had its world premiere at ACT Theatre in Seattle, Washington, running from Jul 3 – Aug 3, 1997. Directed by Leslie Swackhamer, the production featured Mari Nelson and Gloria Foster. The creative team included Carey Wong (sets), Jeanne Arnold (costumes), Greg Sullivan (lighting), Stephen LeGrand (sound).

=== La Jolla Playhouse, San Diego ===
Going to St. Ives was produced by La Jolla Playhouse in San Diego, California, running from Sep 12 – Oct 15, 2000. Directed by Maria Mileaf, the production featured Amy Morton and L. Scott Caldwell. The creative team included Annie Smart (sets), Ann Hould-Ward (costumes), Lenore Doxsee (lighting) and Michael Roth (sound).

=== Primary Stages, Off-Broadway ===
Going to St. Ives made its Off-Broadway premiere with Primary Stages at 59E59 Theaters, running from March 15 – April 24, 2005. Directed by Maria Mileaf, the production featured Vivienne Benesch and L. Scott Caldwell. The creative team included Neil Patel (sets), Ann Hould-Ward (costumes), David Lander (lighting), and Michael Roth (sound).

== Reception ==
The play's Off-Broadway run received critical acclaim, with particular praise for Blessing's writing, Mileaf's direction, and the performances of Caldwell and Benesch.

Charles Isherwood of The New York Times praised the production, writing,

"Questions of life and death are settled over pots of tea in Lee Blessing's Going to St. Ives, which opened last night at the 59E59 Theaters in an assured, strongly acted production from Primary Stages… Mr. Blessing is a fluid, articulate writer with a knack for domesticating seemingly unruly subject matter. In "Going to St. Ives," he wraps the knotty moral issues at hand in a pleasingly neat, dramatic package. We are allowed to ponder a variety of seriously weighty subjects -- the violent legacy of colonialism, the responsibility of Western governments to confront the carnage in Africa, the moral argument for sacrificing one life to save many without breaking into a sweat, or even straying from the soothing presence of a teapot… Under the painstaking direction of Maria Mileaf, both Ms. Benesch and Ms. Caldwell freshen the writing with the immediacy of their performances."

Frank Rizzo of Variety offered similar praise, noting "This two-hander no doubt will be a welcome addition to the repertoire of Blessing’s socially significant and dramatically juicy work, his best since A Walk in the Woods… The essence and depth of the drama is constant under Maria Mileaf’s direction, delicately guiding the shifts of power and persuasion."

John Simon of New York Magazine was also positive in his assessment, observing "Lee Blessing, a fine but somewhat underrated playwright, has an important new play, Going to St. Ives, which cannot be overrated... Well directed by Maria Mileaf, it is superlatively acted by L. Scott Caldwell and Vivienne Benesch and is both serious and amusing, diverting and dramatic. If you want to be a stickler, you could argue that there is a slightly schematic symmetry to it, but it would be foolish to forgo such rare entertainment for the sake of picking a nit or two."

== Awards ==
Year	Association	Category	Recipient	Result	Ref.
2005	Outer Critics Circle Award	Outstanding New Off-Broadway Play	Primary Stages	Won	
2005	Outer Critics Circle Award	Outstanding Actress in a Play	L. Scott Caldwell	Nominated	
2005	Lucille Lortel Award	Outstanding Play	Primary Stages	Nominated	
2005	Obie Award	Distinguished Performance by an Actress	L. Scott Caldwell	Won	
2005	Obie Award	Distinguished Performance by an Actress	Vivienne Benesch	Won	
