= Missing/Kissing =

Play written by John Patrick Shanley

- Written by: John Patrick Shanley
- Original language: English
- Genre: Comedy
- Setting: Eli's apartment, a Thai restaurant

Premiere
- Date premiered: March 2, 1996
- Place premiered: Actors Theatre of Louisville, Humana Festival of New American Plays

Missing/Kissing is a double-bill of one-act plays by John Patrick Shanley, individually titled Missing Marisa and Kissing Christine.

Originally premiering at the Actors Theatre of Louisville as part of the 20th annual Humana Festival of New American Plays, on March 2, 1996. Directed by Doug Hughes, the production featured Christopher Evan Welch, Laura Hughes, Elaine C. Bell, and Daniel Oreskes. The play had its East Coast premiere with Phoenix Theatre Company in Purchase, NY on September 28, 1996. Directed by Maria Mileaf, the production featured Joe Golden, Jud Meyers, Pamela Gray, and Kira Madallo Sesay.

Missing/Kissing made its Off-Broadway premiere with Primary Stages at the 45th Street Theatre on October 17, 1996. Directed by Shanley, the production featured Daniel Oreskes, Jake Weber, Laura Hughes, and Reiko Aylesworth.

== Summary ==
In Missing Marisa, two men, Terry and Eli, confront each other in the later's apartment over a woman they both love, Marisa. Formerly Eli's wife, Marisa left him for Terry but has since disappeared. Terry arrives seeking answers, while Eli remains evasive, and the two engage in a tense, circular conversation marked by rivalry for Marisa's affections. As they discuss Marisa and their shared past, it becomes clear that neither man can reclaim the romantic connection he has lost. A mysterious phone call—possibly from Marisa—goes unanswered, and the encounter ends with Terry accepting a gesture of hospitality from Eli before departing, still dissatisfied.

In Kissing Christine, Larry and Christine meet for a first date at a Thai restaurant. Their conversation reveals that both parties are emotionally adrift: Christine's appearance has been drastically altered from reconstructive surgery post a traumatic accident, while Larry is a married man who has recently separated from his wife and is struggling with loneliness. As they share their personal histories, they form an unexpected connection rooted in radical transparency. Through mutual vulnerability, the two being to bridge their seas of isolation, as the play concludes with a sweet, albeit tentative emotional connection, symbolized by a kiss.

== Characters ==
=== Cast ===
Role	Actors Theatre of Louisville, Lousville 1983	Phoenix Theatre, New York 1996	Primary Stages, New York 1996
Eli	Daniel Oreskes	Jud Meyers	Daniel Oreskes
Larry/Terry	Christopher Evan Welch	Joe Golden	Jake Weber
Christine	Laura Hughes	Pamela Gray	Laura Hughes
Server	Elaine C. Bell	Kira Madallo Sesay	Reiko Aylesworth

== Productions ==
=== Actors Theatre of Louisville ===
Missing/Kissing had its World Premiere at the Actors Theatre of Louisville as part of the 20th annual Humana Festival of New American Plays, running from March 2 through March 30, 1996. Directed by Doug Hughes, the production featured Christopher Evan Welch, Laura Hughes, Elaine C. Bell, and Daniel Oreskes. The creative team included Paul Owen (sets), Jeanette deJong (costumes), T.J. Gerckens (lights), Michael Rasbury (sound), and Ron Riall (props).

=== Phoenix Theatre ===
Missing/Kissing had its East Coast premiere with Phoenix Theatre Company at the Performing Arts Center at Purchase College, running from September 28 through October 13, 1996.Directed by Maria Mileaf, the production featured Joe Golden, Jud Meyers, Pamela Gray, and Kira Madallo Sesay. The creative team included Paul Owen (sets), Amela Baksic (costumes), Shawn K. Kaufman (lights), and Scott Stauffer (sound).

=== Primary Stages ===
Missing/Kissing had its Off-Broadway premiere with Primary Stages, in association with producer Seth Gordon, at the 45th Street Theatre. Directed by Shanley, the cast featured Daniel Oreskes, Jake Weber, Laura Hughes, and Reiko Aylesworth. The creative team included Brad Stokes (sets), Laura Bauer (costumes), Brian Nason (lights), David Van Tieghem (original music & sound), and Sally Plass (props).

== Reception ==
Missing/Kissing received mixed reviews, with most outlets criticizing "Missing Marisa" and praising "Kissing Christine."

Alvin Klein of The New York Times noted, "Be forewarned that it takes about 22 minutes and an intermission to arrive at Kissing Christine, the better and longer part of an evening that begins and is almost done in by an oblique curtain raiser, Missing Marisa. The first play on the evening's double bill is a puzzlement and a downer. Who is Marisa? Where is she? Is she coming to dinner? If not, how come Eli is roasting a chicken? All too soon, it is easy to ask one's own question: who cares?".

Howard Waxman of Variety offered similar sentiments, writing "The first, shorter, and less clever of the two pieces is “Missing Marisa,” in which two men who imagine themselves to be witty exchange verbal jabs over the meaning of friendship, love and maturity... Food plays an important role in both of John Patrick Shanley's new one-act plays, so it is not out of line to say that the evening offers up a strange combination of several subtle and intriguing Eastern spices embedded in some awfully ripe cheese. Delicious moments are overwhelmed before they can be savored and we leave the table wanting less, not more."
