= Third (play) =

- Original language: English
- Written by: Wendy Wasserstein
- Characters: Nancy Gordon; Jack Jameson; Emily Imbrie; Woodson Bull, III; Laurie Jameson
- Genre: Drama
- Setting: New York City, Chicago, Manchester, New Hampshire, Ann Arbor, 1965–1989

Premiere
- Date: September 29, 2005
- Place: Lincoln Center Theater; New York City

Third is the final play written by Tony Award and Pulitzer Prize-winning playwright Wendy Wasserstein, which premiered Off-Broadway at Lincoln Center Theater in 2005. Directed by Daniel J. Sullivan, the cast featured Amy Aquino, Charles Durning, Gaby Hoffmann, Jason Ritter, and Dianne Wiest. The play involves a female professor and her interactions with a student.

== Characters ==
- Nancy Gordon
- Jack Jameson
- Emily Imbrie
- Woodson Bull, III
- Laurie Jameson

== Plot ==
The play takes place at a small New England college during one academic year. It focuses on the life of a female college professor at a prestigious liberal arts college, Laurie Jameson, and how her life and fundamental assumptions are challenged by an encounter with a student, Woodson Bull, III. The professor and student have strongly divergent personal and political characteristics. Because of these differences, the professor accuses the student of plagiarism when he turns in an assignment that seems, to her, to be beyond his ability to produce. The play grapples with the issues of stereotyping and identity politics, as well as generational and family issues.

== Production history ==
=== Lincoln Center Theater (New York) ===
Third had its World Premiere at Lincoln Center Theater, running Off-Broadway in the Mitzi Newhouse Theater from September 29 through December 18, 2005. Directed by Daniel J. Sullivan, the cast featured Amy Aquino, Charles Durning, Gaby Hoffmann, Jason Ritter, and Dianne Wiest. The creative ream included Thomas Lynch (sets), Jennifer von Mayrhauser (costumes), Pat Collins (lighting), Scott Stauffer (sound) and Robert Waldman (original music).

=== The Geffen Playhouse (Los Angeles) ===
Third had its Regional Premiere at the Geffen Playhouse in Los Angeles, CA, running from September 19 through October 28, 2007. Directed by Maria Mileaf, the cast featured Christine Lahti, Matt Czuchry, Jayne Brook, Sarah Drew, and M. Emmet Walsh. The creative ream included Vince Mountain (sets), Alex Jaeger (costumes), David Lander (lighting), and Michael Roth (original music & sound).

== Development ==
=== Theater J (Washington D.C.) ===
A version of Third was originally produced as a one-act play at Theater J in Washington D.C., running from January 14 – February 15, 2004. Directed by Michael Barakiva, the cast featured Kathryn Grody, Bill Grimmette, Edward Boroevich, and Janine Barris. This version of third ran in repertory with Wassertein's other one-act play, Welcome To My Rash.

== Critical response ==
Third received mostly positive reviews from critics, specifically for Wasserstein's script, Sullivan's direction, and the ensemble of actors.

Ben Brantley, in a review for The New York Times, wrote "Like Heidi, Laurie is a strong and vulnerable, independent and emotionally needy woman. She is, in other words, a feminine feminist of the stripe that has endeared Ms. Wasserstein to many theatergoers over the years... It's the certainty of uncertainty in life that makes "Third," ... so affecting despite itself. Using the hot button of academic plagiarism to trigger the plot, "Third" suffers from problems common to Ms. Wasserstein's plays: an overly schematic structure, a sometimes artificial-feeling topicality... Yet "Third" exhales a gentle breath of autumn, a rueful awareness of death and of seasons past, that makes it impossible to dismiss."

David Rooney, in a review for Variety, was also complimentary, noting "Wendy Wasserstein’s new play — her best in years — is thematically richer and more emotionally satisfying than any mere political screed. While the writing strays at times into didacticism, director Daniel Sullivan and his flawless cast extract heartening depths of humor, wisdom and poignancy from this story of a woman’s self-reassessment as she heads into the third part of her life."

== Awards and nominations ==
Year	Association	Category	Recipient	Result	Ref.
2005	Lucille Lortel Award	Lucille Lortel Award for Outstanding Lead Actress in a Play	Dianne Wiest	Nominated	
2005	Lucille Lortel Award	Lucille Lortel Award for Outstanding Featured Actor in a Play	Charles Durning	Nominated	
2005	Artios Award	Theatre Casting – Plays	Daniel Swee	Won	
2005	Actors' Equity Association	Clarence Derwent Award	Jason Ritter	Won	
2005	Lincoln Center	Martin E. Segal Award	Jason Ritter	Won	
