= Lia Chang =

American actress, photographer and journalist

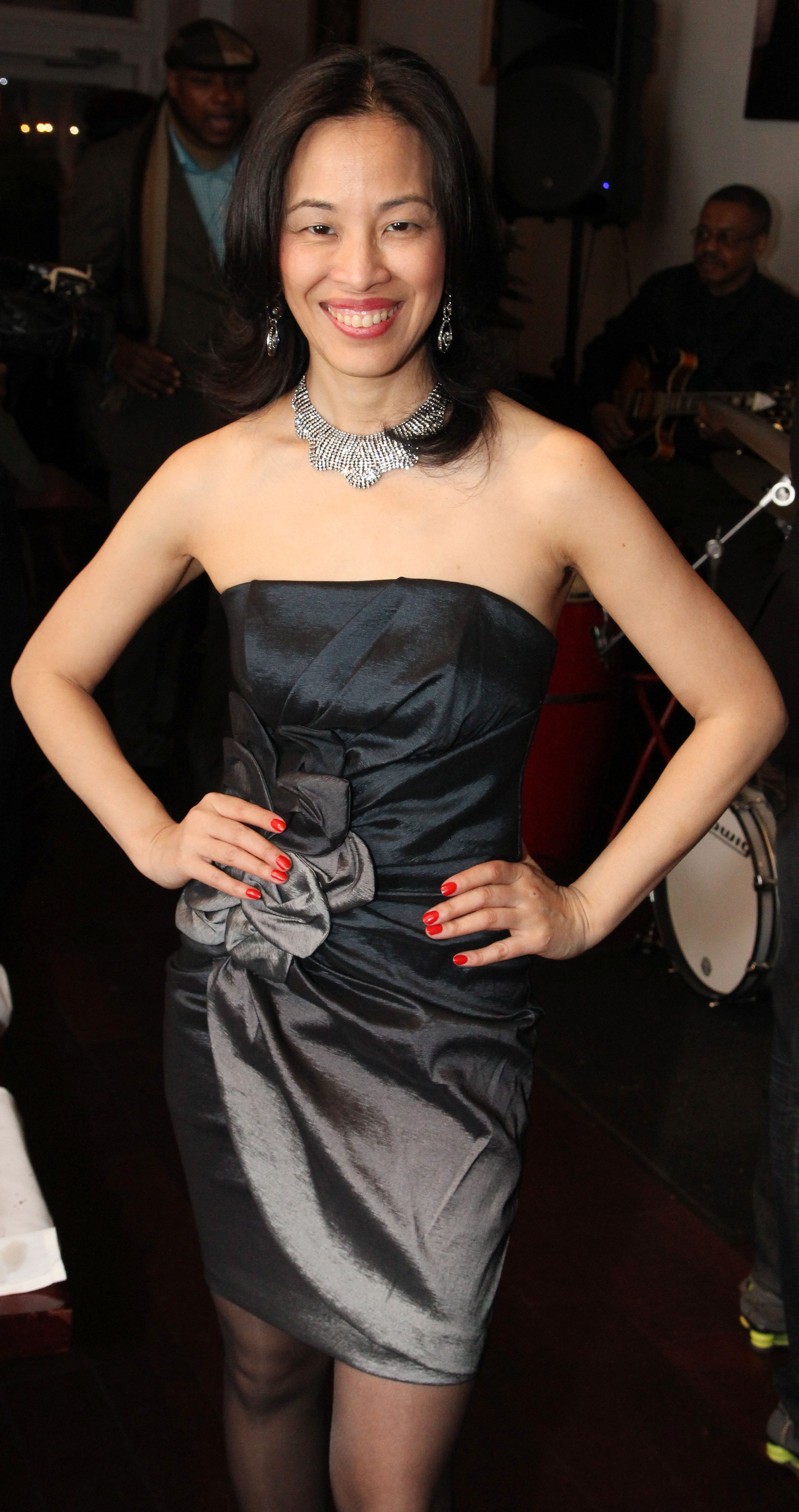
- Lia Chang in New York in 2014.
- Born: September 29, 1963 (age 63); San Francisco, California, U.S.
- Occupations: Actress; photographer; journalist
- Years active: 1981–present
- Website: liachang.com

Lia Chang (born September 29, 1963) is an American actress, journalist, and photographer. After beginning her career modeling and acting in New York and on tour, Chang added parallel careers as a portrait and botanical photographer and journalist.

Chang's photographs have been exhibited in the United States and elsewhere and published in various media. In 2010, the "Lia Chang Theater Photography and Other Works Portfolio" was established in the Asian Pacific American Performing Arts Collection housed in the Library of Congress. She has written as a syndicated columnist and as a writer and editor for AsianConnections.com, is a writer for AsAmNews.com and maintains a blog about the arts, culture, style and Asian American issues.

== Early life ==
Chang was born Kim Anne Chang in San Francisco, California, the daughter of Russell Chang, an engineer, and Beverly Umehara, who was president of the national executive board of the Asian Pacific American Labor Alliance (APALA).

== Acting and modeling ==
Chang began her career as a model in high school, moving to New York in 1981 to work as a petite runway and print model for various accounts including, from 1984 to 1993, as a petite model for Liz Claiborne.

Chang made her feature film debut in Berry Gordy's The Last Dragon in 1984, followed by John Carpenter's Big Trouble in Little China in 1985. In 1986, Chang made her professional stage debut as Liat in a North American tour of Rodgers and Hammerstein's South Pacific, starring Robert Goulet and Barbara Eden, and directed by Geraldine Fitzgerald. In 1990, she made her New York stage debut in Richard Caliban’s Famine Plays with Cucaracha Theatre. During her association with that company, she appeared in Two Gentlemen of Verona (1991) and the late night theater soap opera Underground Soap. She played Angela in Waitin' 2 End Hell, directed by Woodie King, Jr., at the New Federal Theatre, and starred as Jing-mei Woo in an adaptation of Two Kinds, directed by Isaiah Sheffer at Symphony Space, which she also performed for broadcast on National Public Radio. In 1993, at La MaMa she played Princess Noel in Lonnie Carter’s Gulliver in 1993, and she played Suzie in Hot Keys, by Jeff Weiss, with the Naked Angels Theatre Company with the Signature Theatre Company. In 1996, she was Sally and Joy in Sam Shepard's play Chicago at the Public Theater. In 2005 at the Billie Holiday Theatre she played Carole Barbara in Lorey Hayes' Power Play. She reprised her role in the revival of Power Play at the 2013 National Black Theatre Festival.

Her television credits include the recurring character of Nurse Lia on the daytime soap operas One Life to Live and As the World Turns, guest roles on other television shows, such as Another World and New York Undercover, and minor characters in several feature films. In 2015, Chang co-produced, co-wrote and co-starred in the independent short film, Hide and Seek. She is included in Joann Faung Jean Lee's 2000 book Asian American Actors: Oral histories from stage, screen, and television.

Selected filmography

Year	Title	Role
1985	The Last Dragon	Girl Student
1986	Big Trouble in Little China	Female Wing Kong Guard
1989	Another World	Attorney Han Su Lee (TV)
1989–present	One Life to Live	Nurse Lia (TV; recurring)
1989–present	As the World Turns	Nurse Lia (TV; recurring)
1990	King of New York	Gangster’s Gun Moll
1990	Frankenhooker	Crystal
1991	New Jack City	Scotty’s Girl
1991	A Kiss Before Dying	Shoe Saleslady
1994	Wolf	Desk Clerk
1995	New York Undercover	ICU Nurse (TV; episode: "Knock You Out")
1997	Taxman	Mr. Green’s Receptionist
2015	Hide and Seek	Woman

== Photography ==
Chang studied photography at the International Center of Photography. Since the 1980s, she has built a corpus of photographs of persons of color in the arts. In 1995, Chang was commissioned by the APALA to produce a photo essay, "Asian Pacific Americans in the Workforce". In 1996, she received a Murray and Isabella Rayburn Foundation Grant to produce three additional sets of related photos for her first solo exhibition, also titled "Asian Pacific Americans in the Workforce", which were on view for Asian Pacific American Heritage Month at the Tamiment Library and Robert F. Wagner Archives at New York University's Bobst Library; and in Washington D.C. at the National AFL-CIO Headquarters, U.S. Environmental Protection Agency, and the U.S. Department of Justice. In 2001, the West Charleston Library of Las Vegas-Clark County Library District in Las Vegas, Nevada, featured a retrospective of Chang’s work in "Asian Americans: At Home in the Galaxy", a multi-component exhibition which included Notable Asian Americans who have broken boundaries and have carved unique paths to success in their specialized field and "Asian Pacific Americans in the Workforce", ordinary women and men of diverse Asian/Pacific ancestry, working in a variety of fields and occupations. The third component included a fabric book art installation piece called "Coming to America" which detailed her grandmother’s experience of being detained at the Angel Island Immigration Station.

Chang’s photographs are in the permanent collections of the Angel Island Immigration Station, Asian American Federation of New York, Edna McConnell Clark Foundation, the New York City Health and Hospitals Corporation Art Collection and the New York Historical Society. Her portraits of notable Chinese Americans can be seen at the Chinese American Museum in Los Angeles, the Museum of Chinese in America in New York, the Chinese Historical Society of America in San Francisco (portraits of New York's Chinatown after 9/11), and the Japanese American National Museum in Los Angeles.

In 2010, the "Lia Chang Theater Photography and Other Works Portfolio" was established in the Asian Pacific American Performing Arts Collection housed in the Library of Congress. In 2011, In Rehearsal, a display of 36 photographs drawn from that Portfolio were on view in the Asian Division Reading Room at the Library of Congress, and her "Portraits of New York Chinatown After 9/11" were featured in a Post 9-11 Commemorative Display for the 10th Anniversary of the attacks on the World Trade Center. In 2015, in Playbill, Laura Heywood picked Chang for her top ten list of "Most Useful Theatre Women on Social Media", writing: "Whether it's a live performance, on a red carpet, or behind the scenes at an awards show or opening night, Lia seems to always capture a moment of perfect realness between a star's planned poses. I always feel like I know the subjects more intimately than I did before viewing her photos."

Portraits from Chang's Asian American Pioneer Series are published in Chinese Americans: The Immigration Experience (2000) by Peter Kwong and Dusanka Miscevic. Portraits by Chang have been published in several other books. A photograph by Chang appeared on the book cover for But Still Like Air (2010) by Velina Houston. Her photographs have also appeared in such publications as Vanity Fair, Women’s Wear Daily, The Paris Review, TV Guide, Daily Variety, Interior Design, American Theatre, Washington Post, Backstage, New York Magazine, Playbill.com, Theater Mania, USA Today, The Boston Globe, The New York Times, San Diego Union-Tribune, Los Angeles Times, MinnPost, The Independent Weekly, The Villager, Windy City Times, MPR News, Chicago Magazine, Boston.com and The Wall Street Journal.

== Journalism ==
Chang studied film and communications at Hunter College. She is an Asian American Journalists Association Executive Leadership Graduate (2000), a Western Knight Fellow at USC's Annenberg College of Communications for Specialized Journalism on Entertainment Journalism in the Digital Age (2000), a National Press Photographers Association Visual Edge/Visual Journalism Fellow at the Poynter Institute for New Media (2001), a Scripps Howard New Media Fellow at the Columbia Graduate School of Journalism (2002), and a National Tropical Botanical Garden Environmental Journalism Fellow (2003).

She was a syndicated columnist for KYODO News, writing about arts and entertainment in her "What's Hot in New York" column from 1995–2004. In 1997 Avenue Asia magazine named Chang as one of the "One Hundred Most Influential Asian Americans". In 2000, she received an Organization of Chinese Americans Chinese American Journalist Award for an article entitled "An Active Vision", which detailed the life of her mother, Beverly Umehara, a secretary and mother of four, who became a labor activist and president of the national executive board of the Asian Pacific American Labor Alliance. In 2001, she received the Asian American Journalists Association 2001 National Award for New Media for an article she wrote about her grandmother’s harrowing journey through the Angel Island Immigration Station.

Chang is an editor and writer for AsianConnections.com, Arts and Entertainment reporter for AsAmNews.com and an arts reviewer for All Digitocracy. She maintains a blog about the arts, culture, style and Asian American issues, Backstage Pass with Lia Chang.

== Filmmaking ==
In 2015, Chang co-produced, co-wrote and co-starred in the independent short film, Hide and Seek.

== Awards and honors ==
- 1997 Avenue Asia magazine named her one of the "One Hundred Most Influential Asian Americans"
- 2000 Organization of Chinese Americans 2000 Chinese American Journalist Award
- 2001 Asian American Journalists Association 2001 National Award for New Media
- 2015 Top Ten Films of Film Lab's 11th Annual 72-Hour-Shootout Filmmaking Competition for "Best Short Film", Hide and Seek
- 2015 Top Ten Films of Film Lab's 11th Annual 72-Hour-Shootout Filmmaking Competition for "Best Actress", Hide and Seek (nomination)

== Selected exhibits ==
- 1996: "Asian Pacific Americans in the Workforce" on view at National AFL–CIO Headquarters, Washington DC; Environmental Protection Agency, Washington DC; U.S. Department of Justice, Washington DC; Tamiment Labor Library/NYU Bobst Library, New York, NY; and Phillips Exeter Academy, Exeter, New Hampshire
- 1997: National Transportation Safety Board, Washington DC
- 2001: "Asian Americans: At Home in the Galaxy" on view at West Charleston Library, Las Vegas, NV. This multi-component exhibition includes notable Asian Americans as well as ordinary women and men of diverse Asian/Pacific ancestry, working in a variety of fields and occupations. The third component of the exhibition is a fabric book art installation piece called "Coming to America" which details Chang's grandmother’s experience of being detained at the Angel Island Immigration Station.
- 2002: "From Clay Street to Canal: Remembering NY Chinatown in the Wake of Sept. 11th" at Museum of Chinese in America; and Chinese Historical Society of America, San Francisco, CA.
- 2008: "Actor BD Wong: In Rehearsal with Herringbone at McCarter Theatre", Princeton, NJ
- 2009: "Chinese New Year in New York Chinatown" at Gouveneur Healthcare Services, New York, NY, presented by New York City Health and Hospitals Corporation Art Collection
- 2010: "Art and Healing-Healthy for the Holidays Features Andy Warhol, Romare Bearden, Lia Chang" at the Snug Harbor Cultural Center and Botanical Garden, Staten Island, NY
- 2011: "In Rehearsal" in the Asian Division Reading Room of the Library of Congress, Washington DC
- 2011: "Portraits of New York Chinatown After 9/11" in the Asian Division Reading Room, Library of Congress, Washington DC
- 2012: "In Rehearsal" in the Asian Division Reading Room of the Library of Congress, Washington D.C.

== Sources ==
- Mišṙevir̈, Duanka Duana; Miscevic, Dusanka; Kwong, Peter (2000). Chinese Americans: The Immigrant Experience by Peter Kwong and Dusanka Miscevic. ISBN 978-0-88363-128-7.
- Lee, Joann Faung Jean (2000). "Aspiring Actors". Asian American Actors: Oral Histories from Stage, Screen, and Television. McFarland. ISBN 0786407301.
