= Powerhouse Theater =

College theater in New York

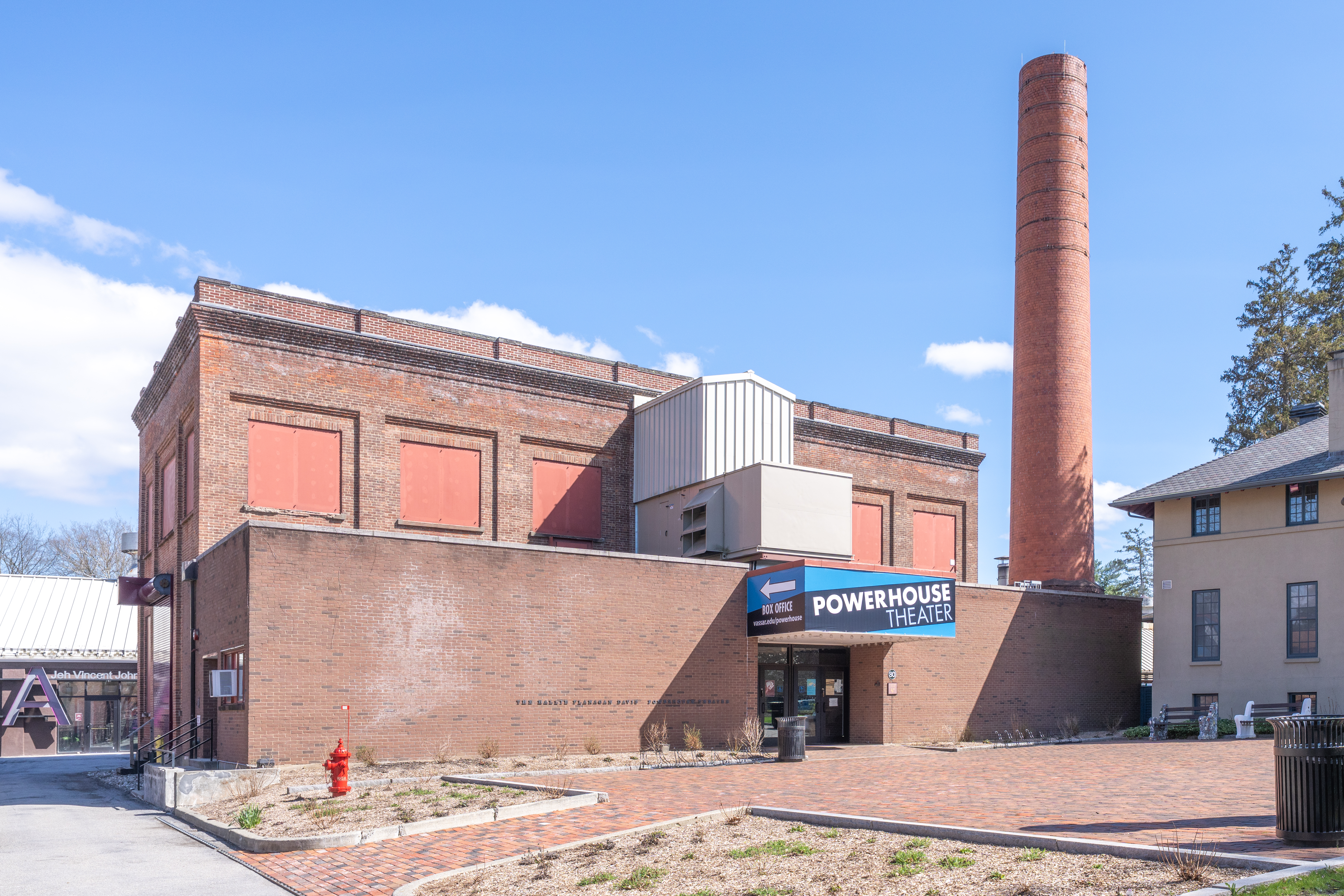
- The Powerhouse in 2026
- Interactive map of Powerhouse Theater
- Full name: Hallie Flanagan Davis Powerhouse Theater
- Coordinates: 41.6866752°N 73.893679°W
- Owner: Vassar College

Construction
- Built: 1912
- Renovated: 1973
- Architects: Lord & Co. (original); Robertson Ward Jr. (renovation)

The Powerhouse Theater (officially the Hallie Flanagan Davis Powerhouse Theater) (Note: Some sources list the building's spelling of Theater as Theatre.) is a theater building on the campus of Vassar College in the town of Poughkeepsie, New York, US. Originally built as a power station in 1912, it was renovated and repurposed as a theater in 1973. Each summer it hosts student productions as well as professional workshops and readings as part of the Vassar–New York Stage and Film Powerhouse Theater program.

== History ==
Vassar College, the first degree-granting institution of higher education for women in the United States, was founded in 1861 in the town of Poughkeepsie, New York. The campus transitioned to electrical lights from gas lighting in 1912, which necessitated the construction of a power station. The building was designed by Lord & Co. and constructed adjacent to the school's Main Building, where it ran until 1954. Thereafter, the college began buying its power from a nearby utility company.

The old power house was retrofitted as the Powerhouse Theater in 1973 by Chicago architect Robertson Ward Jr. A black box theater space, the Powerhouse was designed to allow the audience to occupy a third of the floor space, while the remaining two thirds were to be used as performance space. The building is officially named the Hallie Flanagan Davis Powerhouse Theater, in honor of Hallie Flanagan, founder of the Vassar Experimental Theater program. At the Powerhouse's opening, theater critic Brooks Atkinson spoke and several scenes from Flanagan's works from 1926 were performed. After its renovation, the Powerhouse stood as the only significant construction among the nearby cluster of former service buildings, known collectively as the "backyard" until the 1990s, when the adjacent structures received their own renovations.

== Productions and programs ==
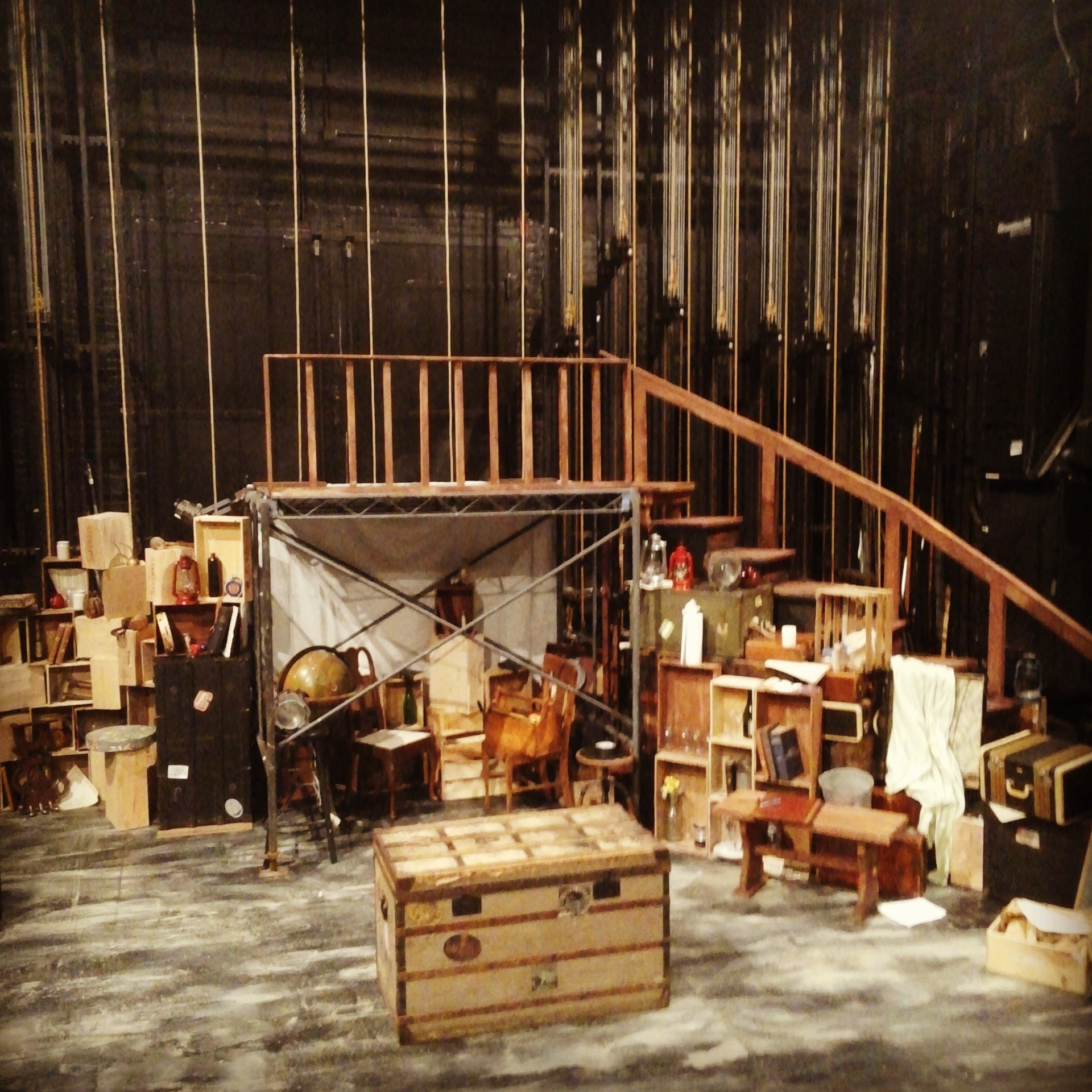
Set for How the Lighthouse Became an Island, an Experimental Theater production from 2016

During the academic year, student-led productions presented by the Experimental Theater are presented in the Powerhouse. During the summer months, the theater plays host to an eight-week professional theater development program, named the Powerhouse Theater after the eponymous structure in which many of the program's readings and performances take place. A collaboration between Vassar College and New York Stage and Film (NYSAF), the program offers theatermakers room to workshop and develop works of film and theater. The NYSAF Powerhouse Theater program was founded in 1984 by Max Mayer, Leslie Urdang, and Mark Linn-Baker. By 2009, it offered an apprenticeship program and had an annual budget of $900,000. Tickets for works presented at the Powerhouse Theater program are open to anyone but reviews, except by local papers, are banned. Broadway shows first presented with the Powerhouse Theater program include 2016 Tony Award winners Hamilton and The Humans, and 2016 Tony award nominee Bright Star, which had won the 2016 Outer Critics Circle Award.
