= 99 Histories =

2002 play by Julia Cho

- Los Angeles promotional poster
- Original language: English
- Written by: Julia Cho
- Subject: Trauma, motherhood, memory and loss
- Genre: Memory play

Premiere
- Date: April 23, 2002
- Place: Cherry Lane Theatre, New York City

99 Histories is a play by Julia Cho. Originally premiering Off-Broadway at the Cherry Lane Theatre on April 23, 2002. Directed by Maria Mileaf, the production featured Elaina Erika Davis, Joel de la Fuente, Ann Hu, Mia Katigbak, Daniel Pettie, and Mia Tagano.

The play had its regional premiere at Theater Mu in Saint Paul, Minnesota. Directed by Cecilie D. Keenan, the production featured Maria Cheng, Cindy Koy, Tae-Jung Kwan, Sean Logan, Jeany Park, and Sara Ochs. 99 Histories was a finalist for the 2002 Susan Smith Blackburn Prize, and was subsequently published/licensed by Dramatists Play Service.

== Characters ==
- Eunice: A 29-year-old former musical prodigy (cello/violin) who is pregnant, unmarried, and struggling with mental illness and memory gaps.
- Sah-Jin: Eunice's mother, a Korean immigrant who loves her daughter but struggles to understand her, often dealing with her own secrets.
- Joe/Daniel Merritt: Characters often played by the same actor, representing Eunice's ex-boyfriend/child's father and an American missionary from Sah-Jin's past.
- Young Woman/Girl: Characters representing figures from the women's pasts, including memories of Korea and childhood.
- Paul: A young doctor considered a suitable potential mate for Eunice by her mother.

== Plot ==
99 Histories follows Eunice Kim, a Korean-American woman and former cello prodigy her returns to her childhood home in Los Angeles after an unplanned pregnancy. Struggling with a history of mental illness and the collapse of her once-promising music career, Eunice seeks refuge while attempting to repair her strained relationship either her mother, Sah-Jin. As Eunice reconnects with her past, the play unfolds through a nonlinear structure that blends present-day interactions with memories, dreams, and imagined histories. These episodes reveal fragments of her upbringing, including the lingering trauma of her father's violent murder during a robbery attempt at the family's convenience store.

Meanwhile, Sah-Jin, who harbors her own secrets and unresolved traumas, participates in the reconstructing of Eunice's memories, often reshaping or reinterpreting the past. Together, mother and daughter confront painful experiences and cultural dislocations tied to their immigrant identity, as well as the Korean concept of Jeong, an enduring emotional bond that binds them despite conflict. As the boundaries between memory and imagination blur, Eunice is questions of identity and belonging. The play culminates in an open-ended resolution, suggesting the possibility of reconciliations while leaving the futuree of Eunice and Sah-Jin relationship uncertain.

== Development ==
99 Histories had developmental readings and workshops with Center Theatre Group (2001), The Sundance Institute (2001), New York Theatre Workshop (2002), and South Coast Repertory's Pacific Playwrights Festival (2002).

The play was later selected for the Cherry Lane Theatre's Mentor Project, with Tony Award-winning playwright David Henry Hwang serving as Cho's mentor.

== Production history ==
=== Cherry Lane Theatre ===
99 Histories had its world premiere at the Cherry Lane Theatre, as part of the 2002 Mentor Project, running Off-Broadway from April 2 through May 25. Directed by Maria Mileaf, the production featured Elaina Erika Davis, Joel de la Fuente, Ann Hu, Mia Katigbak, Daniel Pettie, and Mia Tagano. The creative team included Nathan Heverin (sets), Soonwha Choi (costumes), Nicole Pearce (lighting), Matthew T. Lebe (sound), and Faye Armon-Troncoso (props).

=== Theater Mu ===
99 Histories had its regional premiere at Theater Mu in Saint Paul, Minnesota, running from April 9 through 25, 2004. Directed by Cecilie D. Keenan, the production featured Maria Cheng, Cindy Koy, Tae-Jung Kwan, Sean Logan, Jeany Park, and Sara Ochs. The creative team included Rick Paul (sets), Malia Burkhart (costumes), Mike Grogan (lighting), Dixie Treichel (sound), and Roxanne Skarphal (props).

== Reception ==
The play's various productions received critical acclaim, with particular praise for Cho's script.

Mike Boehm of The Los Angeles Times praised the play, writing

"Large pieces of Julia Cho’s family past in Korea are missing, and she concedes they may never be found. Her play, 99 Histories, is partly a reflection on that loss. It also is the product of Cho’s conviction that in the absence of facts, the imagination must take over, and that it can suffice. The play unfolds like a puzzle piecing itself together... For a young playwright, Cho offers great emotional maturity and economy of words, in addition to a great passion for language."

Veronica An of Dumpling Magazine was equally effusive, stating "Julia Cho crafts a brilliantly executed tale that weaves family drama and memories into a compelling play. 99 Histories focuses on the relationship between a Korean-American mother and daughter, while also addressing issues relevant to the Asian American community."

Megan Garvey of LAist was also kind in her assessment, noting "The play 99 Histories, written by Julia Cho, examines how a Korean immigrant mother, and her American-born daughter, confront – and deny – mental illness… This is like the Asian American live version of A Beautiful Mind, which opens up a lot of conversation for American households everywhere.”

== Awards ==
Year	Award	Recipient	Result	Ref.
2002	Susan Smith Blackburn Prize	Julia Cho	Nominated	
