= Brighde Mullins =

American playwright and poet

- Born: Jacksonville, North Carolina, U.S.
- Education: University of Nevada, Las Vegas (BA); Yale University (MFA); University of Iowa (MFA)
- Occupations: Playwright and Poet

Brighde Mullins is an American playwright and poet.

== Biography ==
She graduated from the Yale School of Drama (Playwriting) and the Iowa Writers' Workshop of the University of Iowa (Poetry), with MFAs.

She taught at San Francisco State University, Brown University, Harvard University, CalArts, and the University of Southern California, where she was also the director of the school's Master of Professional Writing Program. In 2012, she was awarded a John Simon Guggenheim Memorial Foundation Fellowship.

She is a Usual Suspect at New York Theatre Workshop, and is a Core Member of the Playwrights' Center in Minneapolis. In 2014 she was awarded a residency at the Rauschenberg Foundation on Captiva Island.

== Awards ==
- John Simon Guggenheim Memorial Foundation, 2012
- United States Artist Brooks Hopkins Fellowship, 2010
- The Will Glickman Award, 2002
- Whiting Award, 2001
- Jane Chambers Award, 1997
- NEA Fellowship, 1990

== Residencies ==
- MacDowell Colony, 1999, 2002, 2004
- Mabou Mines, 2001
- Institute for Art and Civic Dialogue (with Anna Deavere Smith), 1999
- Lincoln Center, 1995, 1997
- New York Stage and Film, 1995
- Yaddo, 1999, 2004

=== Plays ===
- Pathological Venus, Ensemble Studio Theatre, New York, 1989 (published in Lucky 13. University of Nevada Press. 1995. ISBN 978-0-87417-263-8.)
- Increase, La MaMa, New York, 1990
- Meatless Friday, Women's Project, New York, 1993 (one-act play)
- Baby Hades (published in the Alaska Quarterly Review, Spring 1996
- Topographical Eden, Magic Theatre, San Francisco, 1997 (published in International Theatre Forum Issue 12)
- Monkey in the Middle, New York University, 1999 (published by Playscripts)
- Fire Eater, Tristan Bates Theatre, London, 1999
- Click, Humana Festival, Louisville KY, 2000
- Those Who Can, Do, Clubbed Thumb, New York, 2004 (published by Playscripts)
- Where Dante Would Put the Bush, Flea Theater, New York, 2004 (one-act play)

=== Poems ===
- Water Stories. Slapering Hol Press. 2004. ISBN 978-0-9700277-4-0.

=== Dramaturgy ===
- "Next Year in Jerusalem", Visions and Voices by Stacie Chaiken University of Southern California, 2011
- Shakespearean Interpretation, Lincoln Center Theater, 2000

=== Anthologies ===
- Harold Bloom; David Lehman, eds. (1998). The Best of the Best American Poetry 1988-1997. Scribner. ISBN 978-0-684-84279-0.
- A. R. Ammons; David Lehman, eds. (1994). The Best American Poetry 1994. Simon & Schuster. ISBN 978-0-671-89948-6.

=== Essays ===
- Steven Earnshaw, ed. (2007). "Writing for the Stage". The Handbook of Creative Writing. Edinburgh University Press. ISBN 978-0-7486-2135-4.
