= Sakharam Binder =

Play written by Vijay Tendulkar

Sakharam Binder (Sakharam, the Binder) is a play by Indian playwright Vijay Tendulkar written in Marathi and first performed in 1972. It was banned in India in 1974. It was produced and directed by Kamlakar Sarang.

== Synopsis ==
Sakharam Binder, the protagonist, thinks that he has the system by the tail and that he can disregard the culture and societal values as long as he is truthful. That system is the de facto enslavement of women in postcolonial India, despite the promises of democracy and modernity. Sakharam, a bookbinder, picks up other men's discarded women—castoff wives who would otherwise be homeless, destitute or murdered with impunity, and takes them in as domestic servants and sex partners.

He rules his home like a tin-pot tyrant, yet each woman is told that she is free to leave whenever she likes. He will even give her a sari, 50 rupees and a ticket to wherever she wants to go. "Everything good and proper, where Sakharam Binder is concerned," he says. He claims that he is not a husband who forgets common decency. What he does not anticipate are the moral and emotional complications of this arrangement, which prove heartbreakingly ruinous to everyone involved.

Over the decades, the role of Sakharam has been performed by many actors including Nilu Phule, Sayaji Shinde, Rajiv Nema, Sanjiva Sahai and Jitendra Ghete.

== Adaptation and translations ==
The play has since been adapted and translated into many Indian languages, including Kannada, Hindi, Bengali and English. It was staged in English at an off-Broadway venue as part of The Play Company's season; the production starred Adam Alexi-Malle, Sarita Choudhury, Anna George, Sanjiv Jhaveri and Bernard White and was directed by Maria Mileaf. It was additionally included as the closing play at the month-long Tendulkar Festival held in New York city in 2004.

The play was adapted into two Marathi films of the same name, first by Arun Hornekar in 1974 and then by Sandesh Kulkarni in 2004.
