= Let There Be Love (play) =

2008 play by Kwame Kwei-Armah

- ACT promotional poster
- Written by: Kwame Kwei-Armah
- Characters: Gemma; Alfred; Maria
- Original language: English
- Subject: Immigration, family, race relations
- Genre: Comedy-drama
- Setting: Willesden, North West London

Premiere
- Date premiered: January 17, 2008
- Place premiered: Kiln Theatre, London

Let There Be Love is a play by Kwame Kwei-Armah. Originally premiering at the Kiln Theatre in London, on January 17, 2008. Directed by Kwei-Armah, the cast featured Sharon Duncan-Brewster, Lydia Leonard, and Joseph Marcell. The production was named a "Critic's Choice" by Time Out, and was included in The Daily Telegraph's "Must See Theatre" list.

Let There Be Love had its U.S. premiere at Baltimore Center Stage on February 10, 2010. Directed by Jeremy B. Cohen, the cast featured Avery Brooks, Gretchen Hall, and Pascale Armand. The play later had its West Coast premiere at the American Conservatory Theater in San Francisco on April 8, 2015. Directed by Maria Mileaf, the cast featured Carl Lumbly, Greta Wohlrabe, and Donnetta Lavinia Grays.

== Characters ==
- Gemma
- Alfred
- Maria

== Plot ==
The play follows Alfred, a successful but emotionally closed-off Black British man of the Windrush generation, who lives alone in Willesden, following the breakdown of his marriage. Ordered by his doctors to reduce stress after a health scare, Alfred reluctantly hires a housekeeper, an Easter European immigrant named Maria, whose candid, unconventional manner quickly disrupts his carefully controlled life. Maria's presence slowly challenges Alfred's views on relationships, masculinity, and traditional gender roles. Through their often humorous debates, Maria encourages Alfred to confront his loneliness, particularly his strained relationship with his adult lesbian daughter, Gemma. The play concludes with a note of optimism, suggesting that even deeply ingrained habits and close minded beliefs can be reshaped through empathy and friendship.

== Production history ==
=== Kiln Theatre ===
Let There Be Love had its world premiere at the Kiln Theatre in London, running from January 17 through February 16, 2008. Directed by Kwei-Armah, the cast featured Sharon Duncan-Brewster, Lydia Leonard, and Joseph Marcell. The creative team included Helen Goddard (sets & costumes), Rachael McCutcheon (lighting), and Neil Alexander (sound).

=== Baltimore Center Stage ===
Let There Be Love had its U.S. premiere Baltimore Center Stage in Baltimore, Maryland from February 10 through March 7, 2010. Directed by Jeremy B. Cohen, the cast featured Avery Brooks, Gretchen Hall, and Pascale Armand. The creative team included Riccardo Hernández (sets), Miranda Hoffman (costumes), Michelle Habeck (lighting), and Lindsay Jones (sound).

=== American Conservatory Theater ===
Let There Be Love had its West Coast premiere at the American Conservatory Theater in San Francisco, California from April 8 through May 3, 2015. Directed by Maria Mileaf, the cast featured Carl Lumbly, Greta Wohlrabe, and Donnetta Lavinia Grays. The creative team included Dan Ostling (sets), Lydia Tanji (costumes), Russell H. Champa (lighting), and Bart Fasbender (sound).

=== Penguin Rep ===
Let There Be Love had its New York premiere at Penguin Rep in Stony Point, New York from September 22 through October 15, 2023. Directed by Maria Mileaf, the cast featured Brian D. Coats, Tsebiyah Mishael, and Amanda Kristin Nichols. The creative team included Christopher and Justin Swader (sets), Katherine Roth (costumes), Greg MacPherson (lighting), Bart Fasbender (sound), and Buffy Cardoza (props).

== Reception ==
The play's London run received critical acclaim, with particular praise for Kwei-Armah's writing and direction, as well as for the ensemble of actors. The production was named a "Critic's Choice" by Time Out, and was included in The Daily Telegraph's "Must See Theatre" list.

Charles Spencer in a review for The Telegraph praised the production as a "Poignant redemption of a modern-day Lear", writing,

“Kwame Kwei-Armah is best known for strong, issue-driven plays about the black experience in Britain, focusing particularly on fault-lines within the black community itself. So this new piece, which he directs himself, comes as something of a surprise. It's a domestic drama rather than a political piece, often comic and ultimately touching… The piece is splendidly performed: Joseph Marcell's eloquent Alfred offers a fine mixture of grumbling belligerence, sarky humour and unspoken feeling, while Lydia Leonard, with a delightful Borat-like East European accent, brings charm and humour to the role of Maria, proving that a character of uncomplicated goodness can also be dramatically interesting.”

Trade publication WhatsOnStage was also positive in their assessment, writing "Let There Be Love is charming – even, dare one say, sentimental… Kwei-Armah has denied himself nothing in the heart-tugging department: terminal cancer, a lost love, reconciliation between generations, a reaquaintance with the bath-warm seas of Grenada. It should be unbearable, but I for one was only too pleased to be reminded that life-affirming writing can sometimes be as brave as the more acerbic kind.”

Michael Billington in a review for The Guardian offered a more mixed take, awarding the production 3/5 stars, noting "Having written a virtual state-of-the-nation trilogy for the National, Kwame Kwei-Armah here turns his attention to more intimate matters. Nothing wrong with a change of pace and style; but I can't help feeling that, under its generous-spirited surface, there is a touch of romantic wish fulfilment about the new play."
