= Fred Berner =

American film and television producer and director

Fred Berner (born March 6, 1953) is an American producer and director, best known for producing Maestro, Pollock, and Vanya on 42nd Street, and for directing and producing hundreds of hours of television, including on Law & Order.

== Career ==
Berner and his producing partner Amy Durning first approached the family of conductor and composer Leonard Bernstein for music and life rights in 2008, thus beginning a 15-year journey of research and development, which would eventually result in the Bradley Cooper film Maestro (Netflix, 2023). Maestro stars Carey Mulligan and Bradley Cooper; it was written by Josh Singer and Cooper, and produced by Cooper, Berner, Durning, Kristie Macosko Krieger, Steven Spielberg, and Martin Scorsese.

Prior to this, his New York-based production company, Fred Berner Films, produced independent films such as Louis Malle's Vanya on 42nd Street (1994) and the biopic of painter Jackson Pollock, Pollock (2000). The latter earned Academy Award nominations for Ed Harris and Marcia Gay Harden, with Harden winning the Oscar for Best Supporting Actress. The company also produced 3 Backyards (2010), starring Edie Falco, and Speak (2004), starring a then 13-year-old Kristen Stewart. Berner also produced Straight Talk (1992), starring Dolly Parton.

Berner served as an Executive Producer on Law & Order: Criminal Intent and on the original Law & Order until the latter's cancellation in 2010.

Berner's work also includes several television movies, mini-series, and specials. He directed Law & Order True Crime: The Menendez Murders (2017) starring Edie Falco. As a producer or executive producer, his credits include Murder in a Small Town (1999), starring Gene Wilder; the ABC Special About Us: The Dignity of Children (1997) hosted by Oprah Winfrey (Emmy-nominated); Lakota Woman: Siege at Wounded Knee (1994); Without Warning: The James Brady Story (1991); Rising Son (1990), starring Brian Dennehy and Matt Damon; and Bette Midler's Mondo Beyondo (1988) for HBO.

For the stage, Berner directed Warren Leight's Sec. 310, Row D, Seats 5 and 6 (2014) and Alan Zweibel's Pine Cone Moment (2013) and Happy (2010) for Summer Shorts at 59E59 Theaters. Happy and Sec. 310, Row D, Seats 5 and 6 were also recorded as radio plays for Playing On Air. Berner directed the short film Still Happy, an adaptation of the play, starring Scott Adsit and Arthur French.

Berner is a member of the Directors Guild of America.

== Filmography ==
=== Feature films ===
- Miss Firecracker (1989) – producer
- Straight Talk (1992) – producer
- The Ballad of Little Jo (1993) – producer
- Vanya on 42nd Street (1994) – producer
- The Great White Hype (1996) – producer
- Pollock (2000) – producer
- Speak (2004) – producer
- Handsome Harry (2009) – executive producer
- 3 Backyards (2010) – executive producer
- Maestro (2023) – producer

=== Television series ===
- Law & Order: Criminal Intent (2001–2006) – executive producer, co-executive producer
- Law & Order (2008–2010) – executive producer – director
- Magic City (2013) – executive producer
- Chicago Fire (2016) – director
- Chicago Justice (2017) – director
- Chicago P.D. (2014–2017) – director
- Chicago Med (2015–2018) – director
- Law & Order: Special Victims Unit (2011–2019) – director
- FBI (2018–2019) – director
- FBI: Most Wanted (2020) – director
- Law & Order: Organized Crime (2021–2022) – executive producer, director

=== Television movies and mini-series ===
- Bette Midler's Mondo Beyondo (1988) – producer
- Rising Son (1990) – producer
- Without Warning: The James Brady Story (1991) – producer
- Lakota Woman: Siege at Wounded Knee (1994) – producer
- Hidden in America (1996) – producer
- About Us: The Dignity of Children (1997) – executive producer
- The Farmhouse (1998) – executive producer
- Murder in a Small Town (1999) – producer
- Law & Order True Crime: The Menendez Murders (2017) – director

=== Theater, shorts, radio ===
- Happy, Summer Shorts (2010) – director
- Pine Cone Moment (2013) – director
- Sec. 310, Row D, Seats 5 and 6 (2014) – director
- Still Happy (2019) – director

== Awards and nominations ==
- Maestro; Golden Globe nomination, Best Motion Picture - Drama (2023); Producers Guild of America Awards nomination, Darryl F. Zanuck Award for Outstanding Producer of Theatrical Motion Pictures (2023); Academy Awards nomination, Best Picture (2023)
- About Us: The Dignity of Children; Emmy nomination "Outstanding Children's Program" (1997)
- Hidden in America; Golden Globe nomination (1997)
- Without Warning: The James Brady Story; Emmy nomination "Outstanding Made for Television Movie" (1992)
