= A Nervous Smile =

Play written by John Belluso

A Nervous Smile is a play written by John Belluso that was originally commissioned by the Actors Theatre of Louisville. It opened March 4, 2005, for the 29th annual Humana Festival of New American Plays. The play was originally directed by David Esbjornson and starred Sean Haberle as Brian, Maureen Mueller as Eileen, Mhari Sandoval as Nic, and Dale Soules as Blanka. Unseen characters include heavy reference to Brian and Eileen's child Emily and Nic's son Dominic (both of whom have severe cerebral palsy) as well as to Nic's ex-husband and Blanka's adult daughter. The story is set in a present-day Manhattan apartment.

== Characters ==
Brian: Husband to Eileen in his late 30s, a college professor and failed novelist. Throughout the play he struggles to understand his place as father to a child with cerebral palsy and also grapples with his relationship to his wife and to the woman he is having an affair with.

Eileen: Wife to Brian in her early 40s. A multi-millionaire from investing in her father's company, she is snobbish, alcoholic, and regularly pops pills (Vicodine and Oxycontin being the two primarily mentioned and utilized drugs). She doesn't have any desire to be raising a child with cerebral palsy but also feels a parental instinct to remain with Emily which Brian doesn't.

Nic: A single mom who was once good friends with Eileen. She is now having an affair with Brian. She works as a lawyer who can hardly support her son Dominic, who has severe cerebral palsy. She initially agrees to run away with Brian but freezes up at the last moment and decides she must stay with her son.

Blanka: Brian and Eileen's maid in her late 50s. She is originally from Russia and is the one who actually cares for Emily. Blanka knows Emily's secrets and is the only character in this play to acknowledge Emily as a real person.

== Plot ==
=== Act I ===
The play begins with Brian, Eileen, and Nic returning to Brian and Eileen's apartment in Manhattan. They've just come from the funeral of a child from the Cerebral Palsy Support Group that the three attend. They stopped at a bar on their way home and seem to show an overall lack of empathy for the family of the child that passed. There are clear tensions among the three and while Eileen is out of the room it is revealed that Brian is having an affair with Nic. We then discover that offstage Emily is having a seizure and Eileen once again exits to calm her daughter. While she is away Brian admits his and Eileen's plan. He tells Nic of his dreams to live with her in Buenos Aires and this can happen because Eileen is going to grant him a divorce as well as half his money ($10 million) and a promise they will never see one another again. The couple have planned to abandon Emily at the emergency room in the middle of the night. Brian wants Nic to come with him and insists that she call Dominic's father to have him pick up their son so Nic can run away with Brian. The act ends with Eileen returning to the living room and encouraging Nic to go with the plan and to love Brian. Just before the blackout, Nic agrees to go.

=== Act II ===
This act opens during the middle of the next night, the night in which they plan on abandoning their children and running away. Nic arrives at the apartment early feeling overwhelmed and needing to begin the plan immediately. Brian agrees and goes to wake Eileen and gather her things. While he does so, Nic is left alone. Suddenly, Blanka wakes from where she is sleeping under a blanket on the living room couch. She speaks with Nic and tries to understand why Nic feels the need to abandon her child and Blanka works desperately to convince Nic to stay. Nic, in response, tells her of one of the 'bad days' Dominic had recently and how overwhelmed she has become caring for him, reasoning that because of this her only option is to leave. The scene ends with Brian carrying a sleeping Emily out the door with Nic and Eileen close on his heels.

=== Act III ===
This act begins once more in the Manhattan apartment. Nic and Eileen sit in the living room. The audience learns that Brian left Nic at the airport security check when she began to have second thoughts about running away with him and abandoning her son. It is also revealed that Eileen had fallen into a drug-induced sleep at her own gate and missed her flight to London. Police found them both and they were quickly arrested for child abandonment. Nic has luckily been granted shared custody of her son. However, Eileen is likely to lose Emily and is having to pack up her things which will be picked up by social workers as Emily is going into foster care. As the two women reflect on their shared experiences the image of Brian (wherever he is in the world) appears and he expresses his true hatred for Emily and everything she represents to him. Blanka then returns, having spent all the money that Brian originally paid her to not go to the police. In an emotional outburst, she convinces Eileen to listen to some of Emily's poems which is the last thing the audience hears as the lights go out. They hear a robotic communication board voice slowly becoming the voice of a little girl.

== Past productions ==
- Produced by the New Theatre at The Roxy Performing Arts Center in Florida and directed by Rickey J. Martinez.
- Presented by Theatre Breaking Through Barriers at the Kirk Theater in New York, NY in 2009 and directed by Ike Schambelan.
- Produced by Dramatic Repertory Company at Portland Stage Studio Theater in Maine in 2012 and directed by Whitney Smith.

== Augmented communication ==
In some cases of cerebral palsy, the damage is so severe it affects the person's speech and language abilities. While they may be able to have complex thoughts and ideas, their muscles and vocal chords are unable to form the words that they are trying to express. Augmented forms of communication can vary greatly and include non-technology picture boards, text boards and digitized speech. In A Nervous Smile, we see the two different ends of the augmented communication spectrum, with Dominic possessing a basic communication board and Emily having both an advanced wheelchair and advanced augmented communication that can provide a voice, save things she's said, and predict what she will say.

== Authentic Portrayal ==
Theatre and disability has grown as a movement and portrayal of characters like these characters is subject to greater scrutiny, as disabled actors are more commonly authentically cast, reclaiming disabled stories, bringing authenticity, subtext and postmodern perspective of disability in performance.

== See also ==
- The Cripple of Inishmaan
- Sunrise at Campobello (play)
- Whose Life Is It Anyway? (play)
- The Glass Menagerie
