= Tracey Scott Wilson =

American dramatist

- Wilson in 2026
- Born: Newark, New Jersey
- Education: Rutgers University (BA); Temple University (MA)
- Occupations: Playwright; television writer; screenwriter; television producer
- Writing career
- Notable works: The Story; The Americans; Fosse/Verdon; Respect

Tracey Scott Wilson is an American playwright, television writer, television producer, and screenwriter. She graduated from Rutgers University with a BA degree in English and from Temple University with an MA in English Literature.

== Early life ==
Born in Newark, New Jersey, Wilson began writing fiction after graduating from Temple University. Finding herself unable to finish a novel, she decided to take a playwriting class. "I didn't see much theater as a kid, so I had no expectations....It just took me over." Wilson soon realized that she had found her métier and wrote a number of short plays. At the encouragement of her mentor, playwright Chiori Miyagawa, Wilson applied for and won a New York Theatre Workshop fellowship in 1998.

== Theater career ==
Wilson's work has received readings at New York Theatre Workshop, Second Stage Theatre, The Public Theater, the Williamstown Theatre Festival and Soho Theater Writers' Center in London. Awards and residencies include two Van Lier fellowships from the New York Theatre Workshop, a residency at the Sun dance Institute Playwright's Retreat at Cross and the Sun dance Institute Theater Lab, the 2001 Helen Merrill Emerging Playwright Award, the 2003 AT&T Onstage Award, a 2004 Whiting Award, the 2004 Kesselring Prize, the 2007 L. Arnold Weissmuller Award and the 2007 Time Warner Storytelling Fellowship. In 2009, she was the writer-in-residence at the National Playwrights Conference at the Eugene O’Neill Theater Center. On February 29, 2014, the Joyce Foundation announced that Wilson was one of the recipients of its 2014 Joyce Awards. With her prize, Wilson worked intimately with a community in Minneapolis, Minnesota, and wrote Prep, which debuted at the Pillsbury House Theater during the theater's 2015 season.

Wilson's productions include Order My Steps for Cornerstone Theater Company's Black Faith/AIDS project in Los Angeles; Exhibit #9, which was produced in New York City by New Perspectives Theatre Company and Theatre Outrageous; Leader of the People, produced at New Georges; Buzzer at Pillsbury House Theater and the Public Theater in New York City; two 10-minute plays produced at the Guthrie Theater in Minneapolis, a 10-minute play produced at Actors Theatre of Louisville, and The Good Negro at the Public Theater in New York City.H

Wilson's first major Manhattan production was in 2003 with The Story at the Public Theater. The Good Negro was produced at The Public and then at the Goodman Theater in 2010. Wilson's Buzzer was produced as part of the Goodman's 2013–14 season and was added to the Public Theater's 2014–15 season in October 2014. The Story and The Good Negro have been published by Dramatists Play Service.

The Story, directed by Clint Dyer, made its West End debut in August 2026 at the Royal National Theatre with a cast including BAFTA Award-winner Letitia Wright, Ashley Thomas, Lorraine Toussaint, and Wilf Scolding.

== Television and film career ==
In 2013, she made her television debut by writing an episode of NBC's Do No Harm. In 2015, Wilson was staffed on the FX drama series The Americans. She was nominated four times (2015, 2016, 2017, 2018) for a Writers Guild of America Award for Television: Dramatic Series, winning in 2016 and 2018.. She was nominated for Outstanding Drama Series in 70th Primetime Emmy Awards (2018), and would eventually win a Golden Globe Award for Best Television Series – Drama in 2018 and a Peabody Award in 2018 for her writing on the show. She wrote one episode and served as a co-executive producer of FX's Fosse/Verdon, for which she was also nominated for an Emmy. Wilson signed an overall deal with FX in 2018. In 2019, Wilson teamed up with playwright and television writer Bash Doran to write an episode of Channel 4's Traitors .

In 2019, Wilson joined other WGA members in firing her agents as part of the Guild's stand against the ATA after the two sides were unable to come to an agreement on a new "Code of Conduct" that addressed the practice of packaging.

Wilson penned the screenplay for Respect, the Aretha Franklin biopic released in August 2021.

In 2024, Wilson served as a writer and co-executive producer of Clipped and a writer of American Sports Story on FX. She was a co-executive producer and writer for the fifth and the final season of the The Morning Show on Apple TV.

== Teaching ==
Wilson has taught and guest lectured at Brown University, Yale University, Rutgers University and New York University. In 2023, she was invested as the Barbara Berlanti Professor in Writing for the Screen and Stage at Northwestern University's School of Communication.

== Works ==
- Exhibit #9, New Perspectives Theatre/Theatre Outrageous, New York (1999)
- Leader of the People, New Georges, New York (1999)
- Order My Steps, Cornerstone Theater, Los Angeles (2003)
- The Story, The Public Theater (2003) (Published as The Story. Dramatists Play Service, Inc. 2004. ISBN 978-0-8222-1998-9.)
- Neon Mirage, New York International Fringe Festival (2006)
- The Good Negro, The Public Theater (2009) (Published as The Good Negro. Dramatists Play Service, Inc. 2010. ISBN 978-0-8222-2380-1.)
- Prep, Pillsbury House Theater (2015)
- Buzzer, The Public Theater (2015)

== Anthologies ==
- Adrien-Alice Hansel; Julie Felise Dubiner, eds. (2008). "Paradise". Humana Festival: The Complete Plays. Playscripts, Inc. ISBN 978-0-9709046-1-4.
