= Playing on Air =

American non-profit audio theater company

- Formation: 2010
- Founder: Claudia Catania
- Founded at: New York
- Type: Theater company
- Headquarters: New York
- Official language: English
- Key people: Bobby Cannavale; Timothée Chalamet; Marisa Tomei
- Website: playingonair.org

Playing on Air is a not-for-profit audio theater company that produces short plays and distributes them via public radio and podcast. The company, based in New York, was founded in 2010 by theatrical producer Claudia Catania. Playing on Air has recorded 135 short plays as of November 2021. Its plays have featured notable actors such as Bobby Cannavale, Timothée Chalamet, Carol Kane, Denis O'Hare, and Marisa Tomei. Playing on Air typically records plays in a studio, though occasional shows have included a live audience. After every performance, Catania interviews the play’s artistic team. In addition to its audio drama, Playing on Air administers the James Stevenson Commission for Comedic Short Plays. The commission is offered to several playwrights each year and includes both a cash award and a recording for radio and podcast.

== History ==
In 2010, Claudia Catania attended a reading at an off-Broadway theatre. She realized that a similar amount of time investment from the artists could result in a farther-reaching radio show. Playing on Air’s first demo included the short plays Mrs. Sorken by Christopher Durang, featuring Dana Ivey, and Two Jewish Men in Their Seventies by Alexandra Gersten-Vassilaros, featuring Jerry Stiller. In 2012, the company debuted on public radio in 24 counties across New York State. As of 2021, Playing on Air is available via radio in 14 states and as a podcast.

=== James Stevenson Commission for Short Comedic Plays ===
Once the nation's largest open-submission short play prize, the James Stevenson Prize for Short Comedic Plays awarded a cash prize and audio production to the play that best celebrated the spirit of the late James Stevenson, a celebrated author, illustrator, and beloved New Yorker cartoonist. From 2018 to 2020, submissions were scored blindly by a panel of judges. Notable past judges include David Henry Hwang, Lynn Nottage, Rebecca Taichman, Willy Holtzman, Branden Jacobs-Jenkins, and Paul Rudnick.

In 2021, for the first time since its inception in 2018, Playing on Air did not accept script entries for the Stevenson Prize. Instead, its programming pivoted in a new direction, and the initiative evolved into the James Stevenson Commissions for Short Comedic Plays. Sponsored by Stevenson’s wife, artist Josephine Merck, the commissions share the Stevenson Prize’s aim of bringing new American short plays to a nationwide audience.

In Fall 2021, Playing on Air announced the debut of its first Stevenson commissioned plays, which awarded three talented playwrights - Sarah Gancher, Brittany K. Allen, and Jonathan Spector - $1500 for plays that best celebrate Stevenson's spirit and wisdom.

== Notable artists ==
=== Actors ===
Actors who have participated in Playing on Air’s plays include Ed Asner, Hope Davis, Olympia Dukakis, Harriet Harris, Audra McDonald, and Lois Smith. Other actors include Chris Cooper, Bobby Cannavale, Michelle Williams, John Leguizamo, Margo Martindale, Michael Stuhlbarg, Debra Monk, Julie Halston, Jesse Eisenberg, Rosie Perez, Michael Urie, Kathleen Turner, Jeremy Shamos, Tonya Pinkins, Bill Irwin, Amy Ryan, Sam Waterston, Condola Rashad, Jane Alexander, Adam Driver, Jay O. Sanders, Jane Krakowski, Steven Boyer, John Douglas Thompson, Dana Ivey, Martha Plimpton, and Timothée Chalamet.

=== Playwrights ===
Playing on Air’s catalogue includes works by John Guare, Warren Leight, David Lindsay-Abaire, Jacquelyn Reingold, Paul Rudnick, John Patrick Shanley, Tennessee Williams, and Lanford Wilson. Other playwrights include David Ives, Lynn Nottage, David Auburn, Beth Henley, Christopher Durang, Jesse Eisenberg, Julia Cho, Doug Wright, Alexandra Gersten-Vassilaros, Arlene Hutton, Donald Margulies, Cusi Cram, Sheri Wilner, Rachel Bonds, Willy Holtzman, Cori Thomas, and Daniel Reitz.

=== Directors ===
Directors have included Doug Hughes, Anne Kauffman, John Rando, Seret Scott, Estelle Parsons, RJ Tolan, Rebecca Taichman, Jerry Zaks, Claudia Weill, Jonathan Bernstein, Judith Ivey, Wendy Goldberg, Marsha Mason, and Michael Wilson.
