= Sarah Daniels (playwright) =

British dramatist

Sarah Daniels (born November 1956 in London) is a British dramatist. Her first play, Ripen Our Darkness, was produced at the Royal Court in 1981.

== Career ==
Daniels' playwriting career began after she sent in a script to the Royal Court Theatre in London for reading and spent a year as the writer-in-residence of Sheffield University's English department. Since the early 1980s, her plays have appeared at the National Theatre, the Battersea Arts Centre, the Crucible, Sheffield, and Chicken Shed. Her play Neaptide premiered at the National Theatre in London in 1986. She has also written episodes of the soap operas EastEnders and Holby City and the long-running BBC children's series Grange Hill.

Daniels was involved in the "Video Nasties" censorship debate of the 1980s; in her 1983 play Masterpieces, she mistakenly described the low-budget exploitation film Snuff (1976) as a real-life snuff film. Daniels has had two collections of her plays published by Methuen.

Daniels has been a member of the board of directors for the Clean Break Theatre Company. Daniels' civil partner of many years, activist and schools inspector Claire Walton, died in 2009.

In June 2019, Daniels' dramatization of Jeremy Gavron's 2015 A Woman on the Edge of Time, a memoir of his mother Hannah Gavron, was broadcast as the 15 Minute Drama on BBC Radio 4.

== Plays ==
- Ma's Flesh Is Grass (1981)
- Ripen Our Darkness (1981)
- Masterpieces (1983)
- The Devil's Gateway (1983)
- Neaptide (1984)
- Byrthrite (1986)
- The Gut Girls (1988)
- Beside Herself (1990)
- Head Rot Holiday (1991)
- The Madness of Esme and Shaz (1994)
- Purple Side Coasters (1995)
- Best Mates (2000)
- Morning Glory (2001)
- Dust (2003)
- Sound Barriers (2005)
- Flying Under Bridges (2005)
- Who's Afraid of Virginia's Sister? (2006)
- God Blind Me (radio play, 2007)
- But If You Try Sometimes (radio play, 2011)
- Talking About a Revolution (radio play, BBC Radio 4, 2022)
