= Albany Theatre =

Theatre and arts centre in Deptford, London, England

The Albany
- Albany Empire
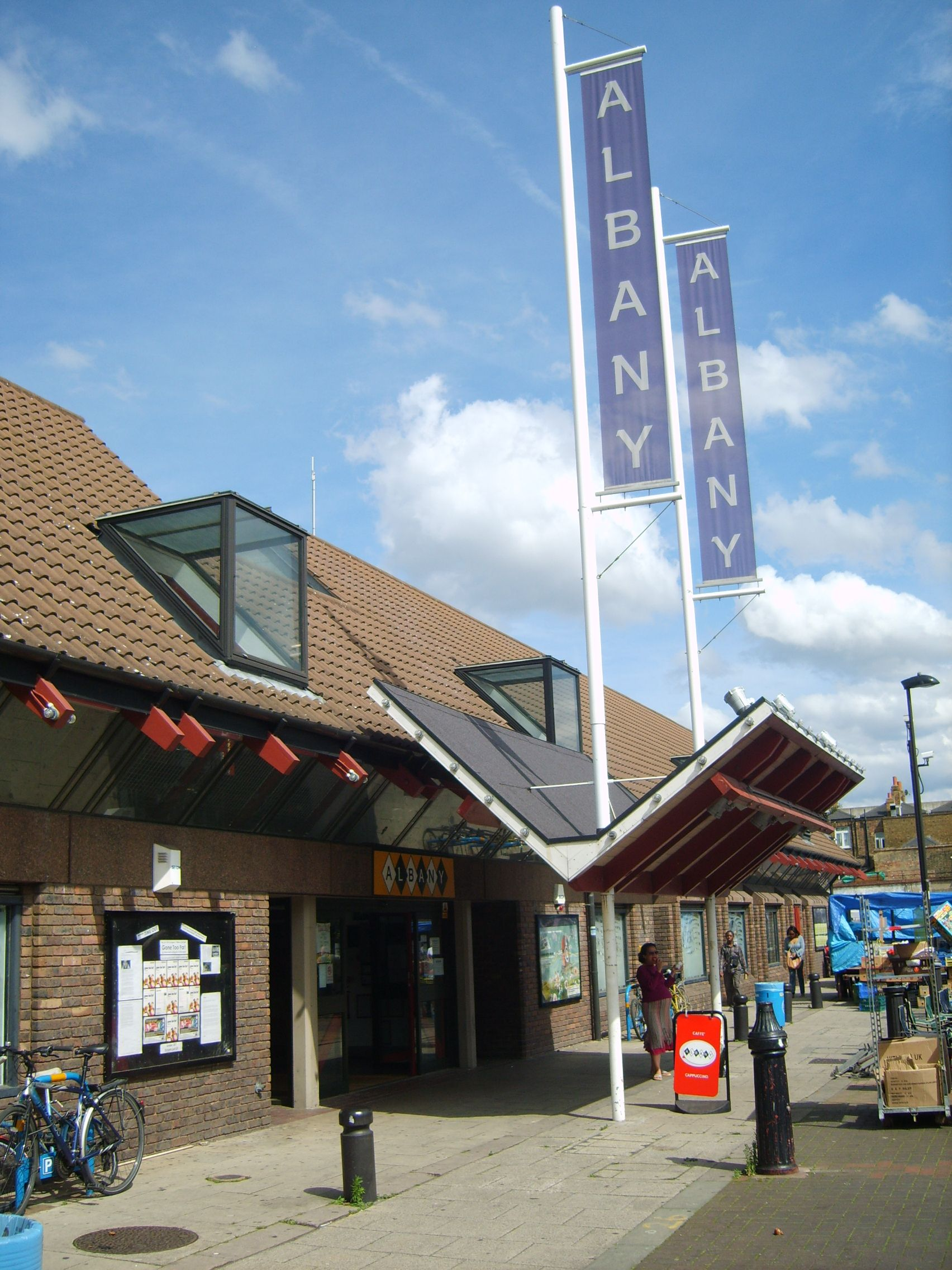
- Interactive map of The Albany
- Location: Deptford; London, SE14; United Kingdom
- Coordinates: 51.4777°N 0.0276°W
- Capacity: 500
- Public transit: Deptford; New Cross

Construction
- Opened: 1899 (original building)
- Rebuilt: 1982 (new building)

Website
- http://www.thealbany.org.uk

The Albany is a multi-purpose arts centre in Deptford, south-east London.

Facilities include a flexible performance space holding up to 300 seated or 500 standing and a bar, two studio theatres, a performance cafe and rehearsal / meeting rooms. The Albany currently hosts a varied programme of events including music, spoken word, theatre, club nights, and children's shows. Several arts and community organisations are based at the Albany including spoken-word promoters Apples & Snakes and Heart n Soul, who provide opportunities for artists with learning disabilities.

== History ==
The Albany was originally established as The Deptford Fund in 1894 as a philanthropical group aimed at assisting the local community that had suffered since the closure of the dock in 1869. The fund took on a physical home when the purpose-built "Albany Institute" was opened in 1899 by its namesake, the Duchess of Albany. A daughter-in-law of Queen Victoria, the Duchess was an active patron of the Deptford Fund — a project founded to help women secure employment away from the dangerous local trades in the slaughterhouses. The Fund soon expanded its scope and the institute was built to house the various activities that supported and involved a local population with high levels of poverty and deprivation.

In the early 1970s a touring theatre company, "The Combination", became resident at the Albany and the organisation began to focus on fusion between community work and the arts. The Albany Empire (as the Albany's theatre was then called) became a centre for Rock Against Racism and hosted fifteen gigs by musicians in support; for example Dire Straits, Squeeze, and Elvis Costello performed there.

On 14 July 1978, the Albany Empire was destroyed by fire, the cause of which was not established. Arson was suspected. A new complex incorporating theatre spaces, a cafe, community rooms and offices was officially opened by Diana, Princess of Wales, in 1982.

During the 1980s the Albany hosted performances by artists such as Elvis Costello, Squeeze, Vic Reeves and Bob Mortimer, Julian Clary, Courtney Pine and the Jazz Warriors. The building was also home to many social, creative and community organisations.

Cuts in public funding in the 1990s meant the arts programme had to be scaled back. However, in 2001 the Royal National Theatre's Art of Regeneration initiative invested heavily in the organisation, enabling refurbishment of the building by Sprunt Architects to be completed and the re-establishment of a programme of performances.

The Albany continues to develop its artistic programme with a focus on topical and community focused work. It also runs a number of initiatives, such as the Meet Me at the Albany campaign that aims to provide activity groups and performance opportunities for the local elderly community.

Sample billings
1978–1981 concerts
Date	Year	Musician(s)	Tour	Note
27 October	1976	Squeeze	--	as Empire
3 April	1978	Squeeze	--	as Empire
2 July	1978	Dire Straits	Dire Straits Tour	as Empire
28 December	1978	Squeeze	--	--
18 December	1981	Squeeze	--	--
