= Julia Cho =

American screenwriter (born 1975)

- Born: July 5, 1975 (age 51); Los Angeles, California, U.S.
- Education: Amherst College (BA); University of California, Berkeley (MA); New York University (MFA); Juilliard School (GrDip)

Julia Cho (born July 5, 1975) is an American playwright and television writer. In March 2020 she was awarded the Windham-Campbell Literature Prize.

== Select full length plays ==
=== 99 Histories (2002) ===
99 Histories is a drama portraying the narratives of Eunice, a young woman who discovers her unexpected pregnancy. She recalls her childhood as a musical prodigy, but soon finds out about the negative and dark past that she endured through. This play explores the themes of memory, the emotional bond between mother and child, and a Korean cultural concept of Chung. According to Julia Cho, herself in her interview with LA Times, Chung is “what exists between people who are so closely bonded that, for better or worse, each is essential to the other’s achieving full self-hood.”

Before the official premier, 99 Histories was presented as a staged reading at Mark Taper Forum (2001), Sundance Institute Theatre Lab (2001), New York Theatre Workshop (2002), and South Coast Repertory's Pacific Playwrights Festival (2002). It premiered from April 9 to 25 of 2004 at the Theater Mu, located in Saint Paul, Minnesota, directed by Cecilie D. Keenan.

=== The Language Archive (2009) ===
The Language Archive depicts a dedicated linguist, George, who is unable to express himself after the break-up of his marriage. The play won the Susan Smith Blackburn Prize in 2010. It premiered at Roundabout Theater Company directed by Mark Brokaw in 2010, and was staged at National Theatre Studio by Andrea Ferran in 2013.

=== Office Hour (2016) ===
Office Hour was Julia Cho's reaction to the Virginia Tech mass-shooting in 2007. This play consists of four characters. Cho writes specifically about Gina's attempts to converse with Dennis and convince him to attend her office hours. It addresses the concept of “good” and “bad” as well as the violent tendencies that Dennis possesses. It explores the reason that college students may resort to violence. Cho also tries to address the widely held misconception that most mass shooters are caucasian males. This exploration is done through casting Ki-Hong Lee, a Korean American actor, for the role of Dennis in the premiere performances.

=== Aubergine (2017) ===
Aubergine (2017) is a play that explores the concept of Asian American identity through family and memory. She specifically states that “The play at its core is also just a play about life: about the things that we carry with us, the things that we eat, and why we eat the things we eat.” Discussion of food and identity in Aubergine incorporates the discussion of diaspora, which can be characterized by individuals' experiences away from their homeland. Cho expands on the concept of 1.5 and second generations of Korean American immigrants throughout the play.

She focuses on the discussion of identity issues through dramaturgically assigning roles that food serves in increasing accessibility of the conversation as a whole. Her writing explores themes that are universal in nature through “constructing different subjectivity” that evokes sympathy regardless of one's identity. Julia Cho was one of the five playwrights whose works were performed as parts of “Korea Diaspora Season” in National Theater Company of Korea in Yongsan-Gu, Seoul. Aubergine returned to the National Theater of Korea on March 6, 2018.

=== Other full length plays ===
==== BFE (2003) ====
BFE depicts the life of a fourteen-year-old girl, Panny. Julia Cho explores the concept of childhood and adulthood through the narratives of Panny's first-year experience at a high school.

==== The Architecture of Loss (2004) ====
The Architecture of Loss consists of reminiscent and multitude of perspectives through the lenses of Greg, a father whose son disappears. This play depicts the day that his son returns home and tries to address the aftermaths and influences that his disappearance had had on the family as a whole. The sense of loss is explored through not only the literal disappearance of a person but also through the effects that an incident like that has on the remaining family.

==== Durango (2006) ====
Durango is a play about a Korean immigrant, Boo-Seng Lee's narrative about his immigrant experiences as a single father with two sons. Expectations based on the idea of the “American Dream” against the reality is clearly demonstrated through his experiences in the American southwest.

==== The Winchester House (2006) ====
The Winchester House is V's story—a narrative about her contemplation of her identity and its development. When she is given the chance to examine and confront her past, she is also given a choice: to tell the same, original narrative or to tell a new one.

==== The Piano Teacher (2007) ====
The Piano Teacher is about Mrs. K's nostalgia and the effects of her decision to contact her former piano students. Memories can be a positive force that reduces sense of loneliness and solitude—it can also be a negative force that opens up the possibilities of darker truths.

=== Screen writing ===
As a screenwriter, Cho has written for the television series Big Love, Fringe, Betrayal, Halt and Catch Fire along with the Pixar animated features Turning Red and Elio.

== Themes ==
Julia Cho's plays are described to make no explicit recognition or celebration of Korea, but rather naturally embedded in the stories by Mee Won Lee, Korean theatre studies professor at Korea National University of Arts. Her works specifically depict women influenced by the Korean diaspora. BFE, for instance, depicts a Korean American woman who had to endure through exorcized stereotypes about Asian women. Another example is Nora, the female protagonist of The Architecture of Loss, who immigrated to the United States following her marriage to an American soldier. 99 Histories illustrate the life of Eunice, former cello prodigy, struggling through depression and unsettlement in her family.

== Notable works and collaborators ==
Full-Length Plays
Title	Year	Producer/Theatre Company	Cast Required	Awards/Honors
99 Histories	2002	Cherry Lane Theatre; South Coast Repertory	4 females (1 teen); 2 males	2002 Susan Smith Blackburn Prize (Finalist)
BFE	2003	Seattle Repertory Theatre; Playwrights Horizons	5 females 4 males	2004 L. Arnold Weissberger Award
The Architecture of Loss	2004	New York Theatre Workshop	2 females 5 males	
Durango	2006	The Public Theater	5 males	2005 Barrie and Bernice Stavis Playwriting Award
The Winchester House	2006	Boston Court Pasadena Theatre Company	3 females 3 males	
The Piano Teacher	2007	South Coast Repertory; Vineyard Theatre	2 females 1 male	2007 Susan Smith Blackburn Prize (Finalist)
The Language Archive	2009	South Coast Repertory; Roundabout Theatre Company	3 females 2 males	2010 Susan Smith Blackburn Prize; 2010 Garland Award
Office Hour	2016	South Coast Repertory; The Public Theater	2 females 2 males	
Aubergine	2017	Playwrights Horizons; National Theater of Korea	2 females 4 males	
One-Acts
How To Be a Good Son	2004	Kobe City University of Foreign Studies		
Bay and the Spectacles of Doom	2005	La Jolla Playhouse		
100 Most Beautiful Names of Todd	2006	Ensemble Studio Theatre		
First Tree in Antarctica	2007	Ensemble Studio Theatre		
Post It	2008	The Actor's Playpen		
Round and Round	2008	Milagro Theatre		

Television
Production Title	Year	Relevant Episodes	Position
Fringe	2008	"Power Hungry"	Writer
Fringe	2008	"The Dreamscape"	Writer
Fringe	2009	"Inner Child"	Writer
Big Love	2010 (Note: Also story editor of season 4)	"Blood Atonement"	Writer
Big Love	2011 (Note: Also executive story editor of season 5)	"A Seat at the Table"	Writer
Betrayal	2013	"...Except When the Bear Is Chasing You"	Co-producer
Betrayal	2013	"...The Things That Drive Man Crazy"	Writer
Betrayal	2013	"It's Just You and Me Now..."	Co-producer
Betrayal	2014	"Sharper Than a Serpen't Tooth"	Writer
Halt and Catch Fire	2017 (Note: Also producer of season 4)	"A Connection Is Made"	Writer

Film
Production Title	Year	Role	Notes
Turning Red	2022	Writer	Co-written screenplay with Domee Shi; co-written story with Domee Shi and Sarah Streicher
Elio	2025	Writer	Co-written screenplay with Mark Hammer and Mike Jones, co-written story with Adrian Molina, Madeline Sharafian, and Domee Shi

== Personal life ==
As of 2010, Cho and her husband live in West Los Angeles.
