= New York Stage and Film =

Art and film institution

New York Stage and Film is an art and film institution founded in 1985 by Mark Linn-Baker, Max Mayer and Leslie Urdang.

Each year, in collaboration with Vassar College they produce the Powerhouse Season and Powerhouse Training Company. Year round work includes programming in New York City and the Hudson Valley, as well as a Filmmakers' Workshop. This work annually supports:

- 400 professional artists
- 40 professional projects
- 75 student writers, directors, actors, and interns
- 10,000 audience members

Johanna Pfaelzer was named NYSAF's first Artistic Director in 2007, having first worked with the company as Managing Producer in 1998, and later as a Producing Director. In 2019, Johanna stepped down from her post and handed the reins to Christopher Burney, NYSAF's second Artistic Director.

Dozens of notable works trace their developmental roots to NYSAF, including the 2016 Tony Award winners for Best Musical Hamilton (musical) and Best Play The Humans (play), as well as the Tony Award-winning plays Side Man and Doubt: A Parable, the Broadway musicals Hadestown, Head over Heels, American Idiot, Bright Star, and the 2017 Pulitzer finalists The Wolves and Taylor Mac's A 24-Decade History of Popular Music.

== Awards ==
=== Founders award ===
Recipients of the annual Founders' Award for Emerging Playwrights include:

- 2010 Eric Bernat
- 2011 Jonathan Caren
- 2012 Don Nguyen
- 2013 Sarah Gancher
- 2014 Suzanne Heathcote
- 2015 Harrison David Rivers
- 2016 Max Vernon
- 2017 Ngozi Anyanwu
- 2018 Khat Knotahaiku
- 2019 Keelay Gipson
- 2020 Kirya Traber
