= Pamela Gray =

American screenwriter (born 1956)

- Born: 1956 (age 69–70); New York City, New York, U.S.
- Education: M.A. Boston University
- Occupation: Screenwriter

Pamela Gray (born 1956) is an American screenwriter.

== Biography ==
Gray was raised in a Jewish family in New York City, the daughter of a salesman and a schoolteacher. She earned an M.A. in poetry from Boston University after which she spent several years teaching. While living in Oakland, she wrote a script for a play that had a successful run. She then moved to Los Angeles and enrolled in UCLA's screenwriting program (where she studied under Lew Hunter) during which she interned with the producer of Star Trek: The Next Generation.

== Career ==
During Gray's internship at Star Trek, she re-wrote an episode (Violations) which was used.

In 1992, she wrote The Blouse Man (retitled A Walk on the Moon) based on her experiences vacationing in the Catskills for which she won the Samuel Goldwyn Writing Award. The script was not initially purchased until it was seen by actor Tony Goldwyn who was given the script by his agency, Creative Artists Agency. They tried to recruit David Seltzer as director but failed and they then agreed to let Goldwyn direct. This began a longtime collaboration between Gray as writer and Goldwyn as director.

A Walk on the Moon was later adapted into a play and produced at the American Conservatory Theater in San Francisco. In a 2018 interview with Taylor Steinbeck, Gray reflected on the teenage zeitgeist the story represents:

The 1960s was an era similar to today when teenagers had a stake in what was happening politically. I’ve heard young gun control activists from Parkland, Florida, saying, “People of our age group haven’t had a voice since the ’60s.” Just like the kids of today, the kids in the ’60s didn’t trust their government, but they didn’t believe they were powerless. In Moon, Alison says that Woodstock is going to end the war in Vietnam. There was this belief in the power of youth.

Gray then signed with Miramax and wrote Music of the Heart, a fictional story about the life of violin teacher Roberta Guaspari directed by Wes Craven and starring Meryl Streep. Gray went on to write Conviction (2010), which starred Hilary Swank and Sam Rockwell and premiered at the Toronto International Film Festival. It tells the real-life story of Betty Anne Waters, who tries to get her brother's life sentence overturned. In a 2010 interview with FF2 Media's Jan Lisa Huttner, Tony Goldwyn commented on Betty Anne Waters's character:

You know Betty Anne's great survival skill—I realized getting to know her—her great survival skill is her understanding of what it means to love another person. That, to me, is her great heroism and the source of her courage and her strength. Betty Anne, because she just impulsively and instinctively loves the people in her life, she has this network of people that adore her.

Gray's film Megan Leavey (2017) tells the true story of a young woman (played by Kate Mara) who joins the Marines to escape her small New York town, and forms a bond with a combat dog named Rex. The film received positive reviews with 87% on Rotten Tomatoes.

For television, Gray wrote episodes for Once and Again in 1999 and for The Divide in 2014.
