= Neil Patel (designer) =

- Born: Bangor, Wales
- Education: Yale University (BA); University of California, San Diego (MFA)
- Occupation: Designer
- Spouse: Maria Mileaf
- Children: 2
- Website: www.neilpatel.space

Neil Patel is an American designer for film and television, as well as for opera and the theater. For his work in theater he has twice been honored with the Obie Award for "sustained excellence".

== Career ==
Neil Patel is a graduate of Yale College and the University of California, San Diego and has designed for the theater throughout the world. His work in theater includes that for Warren Leight’s Tony Award–winning play Side Man on Broadway, London's West End, and the Kennedy Center; 'night, Mother, Oleanna, [title of show] and Time and the Conways on Broadway; Mughal E Azam at the National Centre for the Performing Arts Mumbai and Delhi; the Pulitzer Prize–winning Dinner With Friends off-Broadway and on national US tour; and productions for the Guthrie Theater, the Steppenwolf Theater, the Royal Shakespeare Company, the Royal Court Theatre, Tokyo's Parco Theater, the Gate Theatre, the Edinburgh International Festival, the Brooklyn Academy of Music and many other regional companies in the United States and abroad. Since 1997 he has been a member of Anne Bogart’s SITI Company.

His scenic design for opera includes those for the world premieres of Javier Martinez and Leonard Foglia's El Milagro del Recuerdo at the Houston Grand Opera, Bright Sheng’s Madame Mao at the Santa Fe Opera, and David Carlson’s Anna Karenina at the Florida Grand Opera.

Production design he has done for television includes those for the Peabody Award–winning series In Treatment for HBO, Neil LaBute's Billy and Billie for DirecTV, Dickinson for Apple TV+, and The Path for Hulu.

His production design portfolio for film includes Aardvark, Little Boxes, Some Velvet Morning, Loitering with Intent, and Dil Dhadakne Do.
