= WP Theater =

Off-Broadway theater in New York City

- Formation: January 1‚ 1978
- Type: Theatre group
- Location: 2162 Broadway, New York, NY 10024
- Artistic director: Lisa McNulty
- Website: wptheater.org

WP Theater (formerly known as Women's Project Theater) is a not-for-profit Off-Broadway theater based in New York City. It is the nation's oldest and largest theater company dedicated to developing, producing and promoting the work of Women+ theater artists of all kinds at every stage in their careers. Lisa McNulty serves as the Producing Artistic Director and Michael Sag serves as the Managing Director.

== Background ==
WP Theater was founded in 1978 by Julia Miles to address the conspicuous under representation of women artists working in the American theater. Miles was producing at The American Place Theatre, an Off-Broadway theater dedicated to produce new work by American writers. Miles began as a Producer and Assistant Director at The American Place Theater in 1964 and advanced in the ranks to Associate Director. During this time, she noted the lack of plays written by women being produced by The American Place Theater in comparison to those written by men- at the time, only 6% of all work onstage was written by a woman. Under a grant from the Ford Foundation, Miles created The Women's Project under the umbrella of The American Place Theater to encourage the development of female playwrights and directors and to provide a forum for their work. For its first nine years, WP Theater staged its productions in the basement of The American Place Theater. In 1987, the project left The American Place Theater and became an independent organization, known today as WP Theater. In 1998, the project bought a church at 424 West 55th Street, also the site of Theater Four, which was named the Julia Miles Theater in 2004.

WP Theater aims to empower artists who have historically been marginalized for their gender or gender expression to reach their full potential. The fundamental components of WP Theater are the Main stage Season, the WP Lab and Pipeline Festival, The Space Program, the Pages to Stages Collaboration with viBe Theater Experience, and the annual Women of Achievement Awards gala.

WP Theater artist alumni include Billie Allen, Anne Bogart, Pearl Cleage, Eve Ensler, María Irene Fornés, Pam MacKinnon, Martyna Majok, Alexis Scheer, Danya Taymor Dominique Morisseau, Lynn Nottage, Joyce Carol Oates, Diane Paulus, Sarah Ruhl, Anna Deavere Smith, and Rebecca Taichman.

Actors who have performed in WP Theater productions include Tony Award winners and nominees Michael Cerveris, Kathleen Chalfant, Colleen Dewhurst, Tammy Grimes, Cherry Jones, Tonya Pinkins, Daphne Rubin-Vega, Thomas Sadoski, and Frances Sternhagen, Academy Award winners and nominees Linda Hunt, Kim Hunter, and Mary McDonnell, and Emmy Award winners and nominees Ruby Dee, America Ferrera, Sarah Jessica Parker, Jimmy Smits, and John Spencer. Other actors who have performed in WP Theater productions include Adrienne C. Moore, Pedro Pascal, Ato Essandoh, Richard Masur, Cristin Milioti, Constance Shulman, and Tracie Thoms.

Alumni of the WP Lab include JoAnne Akalaitis, Tea Alagić, Rachel Chavkin, Quíara Alegria Hudes, and Anne Kauffman. Many Lab alumni have served as artistic directors at other theater companies, including Akalaitis (New York Shakespeare Festival and the Public Theater), Emily Mann (McCarter Theatre), Maria Goyanes (Woolly Mammoth), Pam MacKinnon (A.C.T) and Carey Perloff (A.C.T.).

WP Theater founder Julia Miles died on March 18, 2020.

== Productions ==
Since 1978, WP Theater has produced more than 700 Off-Broadway plays and developmental projects and has partnered with a number of other New York theater companies for co-productions, including Playwrights Horizons, the Vineyard Theater, INTAR, and New York Theatre Workshop. Often, WP Theater produces plays that are New York premieres or world premieres. These include Dirty Laundry by Mathilde Dratwa, minor.ity by francisca da silveira, Our Dear Dead Drug Lord by Alexis Scheer, Hurricane Diane by Madeleine George, Bright Half Life written by Tanya Barfield and directed by Leigh Silverman, Stuffed by Lisa Lampanelli, Or, by Liz Duffy Adams, and Virginia Woolf's only play, Freshwater, directed by Anne Bogart.

WP Theater's first production was Choices, a one-woman show that was adapted from the works of Colette, Virginia Woolf, Dorothy Parker, Gertrude Stein, Sylvia Plath, Adrienne Rich, and Joan Didion, among others. It was conceived by writer Patricia Bosworth and adapted by Bosworth, director Caymichael Patten, and actress Lily Lodge. Choices ran from November 30 to December 17, 1978, in the American Place Theater basement. Julia Miles said the production "explores the choices that women have. Hopefully, there are now more of those choices and women are more definite about what they are." After the production opened, Mel Gussow of The New York Times wrote, " Choices serves as a brief introduction to the artistic energy of literary women. Given the variety of versatile people who are engaged in the 'Women's Project', we look forward to the plays, playwrights, and directors that should emerge from the American Place."

In 1981, WP Theater produced Still Life, a documentary-style play about the aftermath of the Vietnam War written and directed by Emily Mann. The production featured Mary McDonnell, Timothy Near, and John Spencer and earned four Obie Awards, including the award for Best Production.

One of WP Theater's most heralded productions is A...My Name is Alice, a revue of songs and sketches conceived and directed by Julianne Boyd and Joan Micklin Silver. The production earned the Outer Critics Circle Award for Best Revue in the 1983/84 season and featured songs and scenes penned by Cassandra Medley, Winnie Holzman, Marta Kauffman, Anne Meara, and others.

WP Theater has worked closely with Cuban-American playwright, María Irene Fornés, since its inception. Fornés, a Pulitzer Prize nominee and nine-time Obie Award winner, is known for her avant-garde and experimental plays. WP Theater has produced three Fornés plays, including Abingdon Square, which earned the 1988 Obie for Best New American Play, and Julia Miles produced eight of Fornes' work in their legendary lifelong collaboration.[17]

== Current Staff at WP ==
Ria Mae Binoaro - Development Manager

Alisha Espinosa - Marketing Director

Kristin Leahey - Bold Associate Artistic Director

Gary Levinson - Production Manager

Lisa McNulty - Producing Artistic Director

Julianna Azevedo Mitchell - Audience and Community Engagement Manager

Ayana Parker Morrison - Co - Facilitator Producer's Lab

Michael Sag - Managing Director

Hannah Sgambellone - Associate Production Manager

Sofia Ubilla - Bold New Play Development Consultant

Michael Valladares - Business and Company Manager

Katherine Wilkinson- Co - Facilitator: Directors Lab

== The Lab ==
The Lab is a two-year residency for Women + playwrights, directors, and producers. Members of the Lab are selected through an application and interview process. The Lab provides its members with a professional network, entrepreneurial and leadership training, rehearsal space, and opportunities for the development and production of new work for the stage.

The Lab began as the Directors Forum, created in 1983. In 1992, WP added the Playwrights Lab. The Producers Lab was added in 2006 to enhance the collaborative nature of the residency.

The Lab has two main goals: to cultivate the work of the participating artists and to give them the tools they need to succeed in the industry. In addition to developing their own unique work, Lab artists collaboratively create a culminating residency production. Since 2016, Lab members' work has been showcased at the biennial Pipeline Festival. For the month-long Pipeline Festival, groups of three—one writer, one director, and one producer—come together to collaborate on a piece.

Prior to 2016, Lab members would devise new work, showcased in a production at the end of the residency term. These productions include The Architecture of Becoming (2014), We Play for the Gods (2012), Global Cooling: The Women Chill (2009), Corporate Carnival (2008), and Girls Just Wanna Have Fund$ (2007).

Prior to 2004, the Lab did not function on a two-year rotation.

Under the auspices of WP Theater, the 2008/2010 Lab Playwrights published Out of Time and Place, a two-volume anthology of plays, including contributions from 11 Lab playwrights and an introduction by Theresa Rebeck.

Many Lab artists continue to work together long after their official residency ends, and WP Theater continues to advocate for its Lab alumnae by connecting them with agents, providing references, and submitting their work to theaters around the country. WP Theater also hires many Lab artists for main stage productions, and artistic roles on the staff.

=== WP Lab alumnae ===
Lab years	Playwrights	Directors	Producers
2024-2026	Jordan Ramirez Puckett	Kayla Amani	Penzi Hill
2024-2026	Deneen Reynolds-Knot	Britt Berke	Roshni Lavelle
2024-2026	Amy Staats	Alex Keegan	Skye Pagon
2024-2026	Mukta Phatak	Mikhaela Mahony	Lianna Rada-Hung
2024-2026	Danielle Stagger	Susanna Jaramillo	Maia Safani
2022-2024	Amara Janae Brady	Jordana De La Cruz	Alverneq Lindsay
2022-2024	Christin Eve Cato	Onyekachi Iwu	Emma Orme
2022-2024	Queen Esther	Julia Sirna-Frest	Sami Pyne
2022-2024	Amina Henry	Dina Vovsi	Barbara Samuels
2022-2024	Else Went	Ran Xia	Praycious Wilson-Gay
2020-2022	Gethsemane Herron-Coward	Miranda Haymon	Iyvon Edebiri
2020-2022	Nambi E. Kelley	Chika Ike	BJ Evans
2020-2022	Haruna Lee	Sophiyaa Nayar	Kristin Leahey
2020-2022	Zizi Majid	Machel Ross	Ayana Parker Morrison
2020-2022	Daaimah Mubashshir	Katherine Wilkinson	Cynthia J. Tong
2018-2020	Vanessa Garcia	Victoria Collado	Ilana Becker
2018-2020	CQ Quintana	Sarah Hughes	Marie Cisco
2018-2020	Bryna Turner	Candis C. Jones	Lucy Jackson
2018-2020	Charly Evon Simpson	Rebecca Martinez	Stephanie Rolland
2018-2020	Eboni Booth	Arpita Mukherjee	Alyssa Simmons

Lab years	Playwrights	Directors	Producers
2016–2018	Donnetta Lavinia Grays	Melissa Crespo	Roxanna Barrios
2016–2018	MJ Kaufman	Morgan Gould	Sally Cade Holmes
2016–2018	Sylvia Khoury	Ellie Heyman	Nidia Medina
2016–2018	Zoe Sarnak	Tyne Rafaeli	Laura Ramadei
2016–2018	Leah Nanako Winkler	Mo Zhou	Yuvika Tolani
2014–2016	Sarah Burgess	Adrienne Campbell-Holt	Pearl Hodiwala
2014–2016	Monet Hurst-Mendoza	Sarah Krohn	Rachel Karpf Reidy
2014–2016	Martyna Majok	Lee Sunday Evans	Kristen Luciani
2014–2016	Riti Sachdeva	Danya Taymor	Liz Olson
2014–2016	Susan Soon He Stanton	Tamilla Woodard	Rachel Sussman
2012–2014	Kara Lee Corthron	Elena Araoz	Deadria Harrington
2012–2014	Sarah Gancher	Lydia Fort	Jane Jung
2012–2014	Virginia Grise	Lauren Keating	Meropi Peponides
2012–2014	Dipika Guha	Lila Neugebauer	Aktina Stathaki
2012–2014	Lauren Yee	Lily Whitsitt	Lanie Zipoy
2010–2012	Alexandra Collier	Tea Alagić	Liz English
2010–2012	Charity Henson-Ballard	Jessi Hill	Manda Martin
2010–2012	Andrea Kuchlewska	Sarah Rasmussen	Roberta Pereira
2010–2012	Dominique Morisseau	Mia Rovegno	Stephanie Ybarra
2010–2012	Kristen Palmer	Nicole A. Watson	
2010–2012	Melisa Tien		
2010–2012	Stefanie Zadravec		
2008–2010	Bekah Brunstetter	Gisela Cardenas	Diane Alianiello
2008–2010	Carla Ching	Heidi Carlsen	Amanda Berkowitz
2008–2010	Alexis Clements	Rachel Chavkin	Heather Cohn
2008–2010	Nadia Davids	Linsay Firman	Jennifer Conley Darling
2008–2010	Laura Eason	Susanna Gellert	Aimee Davis
2008–2010	Christine Evans	Dyana Kimball	Amanda Feldman
2008–2010	Charity Henson-Ballard	Wendy McClellan	Marissa Rosenblum
2008–2010	Kara Manning	Alice Reagan	Allegra Schorr
2008–2010	Lynn Rosen	Gaye Taylor Upchurch	Catherine Taylor-Williams
2008–2010	Crystal Skillman	Donya K. Washington	
2008–2010	Andrea Thome		
2006–2008	Andrea Ciannavei	May Adrales	Leigh Goldenberg
2006–2008	Christina Gorman	Lear DeBessonet	Maria Goyanes
2006–2008	Katori Hall	Gia Forakis	Karen Grenke
2006–2008	Andrea Lepcio	Jyana S. Gregory	Amy Kaissar
2006–2008	Megan Mostyn-Brown	Meredith McDonough	Maggie Lauren
2006–2008	Molly Rice	Lisa Rothe	Patricia McNamara
2006–2008	Peggy Stafford	Daniella Topol	Victoria Murray Beatin
2006–2008	Saviana Stănescu	Kara-Lynn Vaeni	Linda Powell
2006–2008	Joy Tomasko	Meiyin Wang	Allison Prouty
2006–2008	Kathryn Walat	Kim Weild	Bridgette Wimberly
2004–2006	Zakiyyah Alexander	Susanne Agins	
2004–2006	Keli Garrett	Shelley Butler	
2004–2006	Quíara Alegria Hudes	Meredith McDonough	
2004–2006	Cheri Magid	Shannon Rose Marie O'Donnell	
2004–2006	Megan Mostyn-Brown	Teresa K. Pond	
2004–2006	Cybele Pascal	Lauren M. Rosen	
2004–2006	Sonya Sobieski	Lisa Rothe	
2004–2006	Saviana Stănescu	Linnet Taylor	
2004–2006	Kathryn Walat	Daniella Topol	

==== Playwrights Lab members 1992–2004 ====
- Liz Duffy Adams
- Janet Allard
- Taylor Barton
- Neena Beber
- Tish Benson
- Chantal Bilodeau
- Kitty Chen
- Paula Cizmar
- Cynthia L. Cooper (Cindy)
- Cheryl L. Davis
- Margie Duffield
- Linda Faigao-Hall
- Catherine Filloux
- Daisy Foote
- Juliana Francis
- Aimee Gallin
- Barbara Goldman
- Dana Leslie Goldstein
- Daphne Greaves
- Monika Gross
- Susan Eve Haar
- Lisa Humbertson
- Michael angel Johnson
- Jake-Ann Jones
- Mona Koppelman
- Carson Kreitzer
- Michele Aldin Kushner
- Margaret Lamb
- Ji Hyun Lee
- Stephanie Lehmann
- Lucy Lehrer
- Andrea Lepcio
- Patricia Lin
- Jessica Litwak
- Nancy Lubet
- Carol Mack
- Julie McKee
- Cassandra Medley
- Kim Merrill
- Lyssa Miller
- Rachelle Minkoff
- Debbie Mitchell
- Chiori Miyagawa
- Lesli-Jo Morizono
- Laura Quinn
- Elizabeth Scales Rheinfrank
- Carmen Rivera
- Kate Robin
- Alva Rogers
- Sharyn Rothstein
- Sarah Ruhl
- Gail Sheehy
- Jane Shepard
- Marina Shron
- Lynda Sturner
- Judy Tate
- Tracy Thorne
- Alexandra Tolk
- Sheri Wilner
- Beth Windsor

==== Directors Lab/Directors Forum members 1983–2004 ====
- Joyce Aaron
- Josephine Abady
- JoAnne Akalaitis
- Merry Alderman
- Billie Allen
- Marcella Andre
- Cecelia Antoinette
- Marcy Arlin
- Alexandra Aron
- Linda Atkinson
- Julie Fei-Fan Balzer
- Mirra Bank
- Lisa Barnes
- Sue Batchelor
- Jessica Bauman
- Meghan Beals
- Alma Becker
- Suzanne Bennett
- Melia Bensussen
- Jackie Berger
- Randee Mia Berman
- Hilary Blecher
- Donna Tomas Bond
- Robin Bowers
- Julianne Boyd
- Veronica Brady
- Yanna Kroyt Brandt
- Celia Braxton
- Margot Brier
- Brooke Brod
- Page Burkholder
- Carolyn Cantor
- Juliette Carrillo
- Laurie Carlos
- Kay Carney
- Lenora Champagne
- Allyn Chandler
- Tisa Chang
- Linda Chapman
- Linda Cholodenko
- Nancy S. Chu
- Marya Cohn
- Michelle Coleman
- Beatriz Cordoba
- Lee Costello
- Sarah Davie
- Diane L. Dawson
- Lenore DeKoven
- Heather de Michele
- Peg Denithorne
- Judy Dennis
- Liz Diamond
- Toni Dorfman
- Annie Dorsen
- Imani Douglas
- Anne D'Zmura
- Mary Beth Easley
- April-Dawn Gladu
- Carol Goodheart
- Andra Gordon
- Jennifer Uphoff Gray
- Monika Gross
- Robin Guarino
- Denise Hamilton
- Dana Iris Harrel
- Ludovica Villar Hausar
- Yvette Hawkins
- Rosemary Hay
- Catherine M. Head
- Elizabeth A. Herron
- Amy Holston
- Beth Howard
- Lisa Jackson
- Meachie Jones
- Melanie Joseph
- Zoya Kachadurian
- Mia Katigbak
- Sonoko Kawahara
- Anne Kauffman
- Rasa Allan Kazlas
- Francoise Kourilsky
- Rachel Kranz
- Ari Laura Kreith
- Kati Kuroda
- Mahayana Landowne
- Renee LaTulippe
- Sue Lawless
- Susan Leaming
- Sondra Lee
- Karen Lordi
- Kathryn Long
- Karen Ludwig
- Jill Mackavey
- Pam MacKinnon
- Emily Mann
- Jamie Marcu
- Elysa Marden
- Marya Mazor
- Tricia McDermott
- Kate Mennone
- Maria Mileaf
- Mary Louise Miller
- Vernice P. Miller
- Kym Moore
- Isis Saratial Misdary
- Kathryn Moroney
- Ariel Julia Nazarian
- Timothy Near
- Renfreu Neff
- Deborah Nitzberg
- Gail Noppe-Brandon
- Elisabeth Omilami
- Sharon Ott
- Sheila Page
- Shirley Parkinson
- Passion
- Rebecca Patterson
- Carey Perloff
- Livia Perez
- Victoria Pero
- Lisa Peterson
- Renee Philippi
- Lynn Polan
- Joanne Pottlitzer
- Kate Powers
- June Pyskacek
- Shelly Raffle
- Lisandra Maria Ramos
- Elinor Renfield
- Nancy Rhodes
- Joumana Rizk
- Mary Robinson
- Nancy Rogers
- Barbara Rosoff
- Bevya Rosten
- June Rovenger
- Susan Rowlands
- Barbara Rubin
- Deborah Saivetz
- Eva Saks
- Nancy Salomon
- Amy Saltz
- Kristen Sanderson
- Elyse Singer
- Lynne Singer
- Anna Deavere Smith
- Elaine Smith
- Shelley Souza
- Hilary Spector
- Maurya Swanson
- Judy Stewart
- Shilarna Stokes
- Alison Summers
- Sarah Cameron Sunde
- Melanie Sutherland
- Carol Tanzman
- Lynne Taylor-Corbett
- Beatrice Terry
- Joan Vail Thorne
- Laura Tichler
- Virlana Tkacz
- Susana Tubert
- Ching Valdes-Aran
- Valeria Vasilevski
- Jean Wagner
- Marianne Weems
- Claudia Weill
- Adrienne Weiss
- Iona Weissberg
- Helen White
- Melanie White
- B.J. Whiting
- Julia Whitworth
- Maurya Wickstrom
- Rachel Wineberg
- Bryna Wortman
- Evan Yiounoulis
- Gloria Zelaya
- Alison Eve Zell

== Pipeline Festival and Production History ==
In addition to Lab members developing their own unique work, the Lab residency culminates in the biennial Pipeline Festival, a festival of five new plays written, directed and produced by the Lab. The Pipeline Festival gives audiences a unique opportunity to see five new works in various stages of development, ranging from staged readings, to streamed films, to full-length workshop productions – presented over a span of several weeks.

=== Pipeline Production History ===
	Recipients Title	Playwright	Director	Producer
April 4–6 2024	Malicious Compliance	Amara Janae Brady	Julia Sirna-Frest	Praycious Wilson-Gay
April 11–13 2024	O.K!	Christin Eve Cato	Jordana De La Cruz	Barbara Samuels
April 18–20 2024	Blackbirding	Queen Esther	Lorna Ventura	Alverneq Lindsay
April 25–27 2024	When the Other Celeste Sank: A Strange and Umweltian Tale	Amina Henry	Ran Xia	Emma Orme
May 2–4 2024	The Cause	Else Went	Brittany Vasta	
March 24–26 2024	They Came in the Night	Zizi Majid	Carolyn Cantor	Kristin Leahey
April 14–16 2022	Room Enough (For Us All)	Daamiah Mubashshir	Katherine Wilkinson	Ayana Parker Morrison
April 21–23 2022	Kin	Gethsemane Herron-Coward	Chika Ike	Cynthia J. Tong
May 5–8 2022	Plural (Love)	Haruna Lee and Jen Goma	Sophiyaa Nayar	B.J Evans
May 12–14 2022	Re/Memori (Of Hair Land and Sea)	Nambi E. Kelley		Iyvon E.
March 26–28 2020	Phases of the Moon	Bryna Turner	Rebecca Martinez	Stephanie Rolland
April 2–4 2020	Sandblasted	Charly Evon Simpson	Victoria Collado	Ilana Becker
April 9–11 2020	Tobias: A Novel in Performance	CQ Quintana	Arpita Mukherjee	Marie Cisco
April 16–18 2020	Grace, Sponsored by Monteverde	Vanessa Garcia	Sarah Hughes	Alyssa Simmons
April 23–25 2020	My Baby	Sukari Jones	Candis C. Jones	Lucy Jackson
March 29–31 2018	Galatea or Whatever You Be	M.J Kaufman	Mo Zhou	Yuvika Tolani
April 5–7 2018	The Review or How to Eat Your Opposition	Donnetta Lavinia Grays	Melissa Crespo	Roxanna Barrios
April 12–14 2018	Afloat	Music and lyrics by Zoe Sarnak Book by Emily Kaczmarek	Ellie Heyman	Nidia Medina
April 19–21 2018	Powerstrip	Sylvia Khoury	Tyne Rafeli	Laura Ramadei
April 26–28 2018	Two Mile Hollow	Leah Nanako Winkler	Morgan Gould	Sally Cade Holmes
March 24-16 2016	Gygnus	Susan Soon He Stanton	Danya Taymor	Liz Olson
March 31- April 2 2016	Veil'd	Monet Hurst-Mendoza	Sarah Krohn	Kristen Luciani
April 7–9 2016	Kings	Sarah Burgess	Adrienne Campbell-Holt	Pearl Hodiwala
April 14–16 2016	The Rug Dealer	Riti Sachdeva	Lee Sunday Evans	Rachel Sussman
April 21–23 2016	Queens	Martyna Majok	Tamilla Woodward	Rachel Karpf Reidy

=== Prior to Pipeline Festival and First Looks ===
Before the creation of the Pipeline Festival in 2016 the WP Lab presented First Looks, a rehearsed reading series. Similarly to Pipeline, First looks showcased works from Lab playwrights and directors in the span of a month long series. First Looks first premiered in 1999 under founder Julia Miles and continued until 2004. Some works that came out of First Looks include, The Clean House, written by Sarah Ruhl as well as Sex, Death, and the Beach Baby, by Kim Merril.

== Women of Achievement Awards ==
Each year, WP Theater recognizes the extraordinary accomplishments of women from the worlds of entertainment, business, and philanthropy at the Women of Achievement Awards Gala. Since 1986, WP Theater has paid homage to dozens of women who have taken risks, pushed limits, and broken ground in a variety of fields. The event is typically emceed by a female celebrity, with a variety of performances and appearances by other artists. Past recipients of the Women of Achievement Award include Maya Angelou, Katie Couric, Whoopi Goldberg, Billie Jean King, Chita Rivera, and Gloria Steinem.

=== Women of Achievement Award recipients ===
Year	Recipients
2025	Kristin Caskey, Congresswoman Sarah McBride, Dune Thorne, Adrienne Warren
2024	Sutton Foster, LaChanze, Anne Quart
2023	Lauren Reid, Ariana DeBose
2022	Mara Isaacs, Schele Williams, Vanessa Williams
2020	The women of the Entertainment Division of Loeb & Loeb LLP
2019	Bonnie Comley, Amanda Seyfried, Emily Warren
2018	Beth Hammack, Daryl Roth
2017	Debra Messing, Ann M. Sarnoff
2016	Martha Plimpton, Jenna Segal, Trudie Styler
2015	Tyne Daly, Stephanie George, Carolyn Tastad
2014	Sharon Bush, Arianna Huffington, Joan Vail Thorne
2013	Joanna Coles, Helen Gurley Brown (posthumously), Donna Kalajian Lagani, Sheila Nevins, Charlotte St. Martin
2012	Thia Breen, Liz Duffy Adams, Barbara Goldsmith, Cornelia Guest
2011	Bonnie Pfeifer Evans, Mindy Grossman, Bebe Neuwirth
2010	Laurie Anderson, Joan Osborne, Suzanne Vega
2009	Lucia Hwong Gordon, Estelle Parsons, Susan K. Reed, Susan Sobbott
2008	Iris Cantor, Laurie Tucker, Kerry Washington
2007	Eve Ensler, Kathy Hilton, Vivienne Tam
2006	Francine LeFrak, Susan Lucci, Muriel Siebert
2005	Adrien Arpel, Mariska Hargitay, Caroline Hirsch, Emily Mann, Frances Sternhagen
2004	Robin Burns, Donna Murphy, Gail Sheehy, Susan Wadsworth
2003	Bobbi Brown, Tina Chen, Chita Rivera, Isabelle Stevenson
2002	Julie Harris, Phylicia Rashad, Nina Zagat
2001	Evelyn Cunningham, Audra McDonald, Laura Pels, Twyla Tharp, Irene Worth, Eugenia Zukerman
2000	Lauren Bacall, Carole Black, Ruby Dee, Joan Didion
1999	Dame Judi Dench, Patricia Fili-Krushel, Vanessa Redgrave, Susan L. Taylor
1998	Dr. Maya Angelou, Sallie Bingham, Whoopi Goldberg, Julia Miles
1997	Stockard Channing, Annette Green, Marilyn Horne, Rosie O'Donnell
1996	Zoe Caldwell, Camille Cosby, Elinor Guggenheimer, Pat Schoenfeld
1995	Blair Brown, Katie Couric, Donna Hanover, Yue-Sai Kan
1994	Linda Fairstein, Sherry Lansing, Lily Tomlin, Evelyn Lauder
1993	Tina Brown, Kitty Carlisle Hart, Cicely Tyson, Barbara Walters
1992	Linda Ellerbee, Nora Ephron, Jessica Lange, Annie Leibovitz, Bette Bao Lord
1991	Ellen Futter, Donna Karan, Anna Quindlen, Susan Sarandon, Faye Wattleton
1990	Imogene Coca, Suzanne Farrell, Mother Clara Hale, Kathleen Turner
1989	Geraldine Fitzgerald, Jewell Jackson McCabe, Gloria Steinem, Kaity Tong, Wendy Wasserstein
1988	Betty Allen, Diane Coffey, Glenda Jackson, Dr. Mathilde Krim, Diane Sawyer
1987	Betty Friedan, Judith Jamison, Toni Morrison, Beverly Sills, Jessica Tandy
1986	Colleen Dewhurst, María Irene Fornés, Billie Jean King-Blackman, Lucille Lortel, Ruth Mayleas

== Full production history ==
Season	Title	Writer and director	Cast	Location	Notes
2023-2024	minor.ty	By francisca da silveria, directed by Shariffa Ali	Ato Essandoh, Nedra Marie Taylor, Nimene Sierra Wureh	WP Theater	Co-production with Colt Coeur
2023-2024	Dirty Laundry	By Mathilde Dratwa, directed by Rebecca Martinez	Mary Bacon, Sasha Diamond, Amy Jo Jackson, Richard Masur, Lakisha May, Constance Shulman	WP Theater	By special Arrangement with Spark Theatrical/Laurie Bernhard
2023-2024	Bite Me	by Eliana Pipes, directed by Rebecca Martinez	David Garelik, Malika Samuel	WP Theater	Co-production with Colt Coeur
2023-2024	Munich Medea: Happy Family	by Corinne Jaber, directed by Lee Sunday Evans	Crystal Finn, Heather Raffo, Kurt Rhodes	WP Theater	co-production with PlayCo
2022-2023	Space Program:Moxie Arts NY Incubator Program '23	by Alyssa Haddad-Chin, August Hakvaag, Skyler Volpe directed by Autumn Angelettie, Michelle Chan, Annabel Heacock		WP Theater	WP Space Program Residents: Moxie Arts NY
2022-2023	Regretfully, So the Birds Are	by Julia Izumi, directed by Jenny Koons	Sasha Diamond, Gibson Frazier, Antoinette Lavecchia, Kristine Nielsen, Sky Smith, Pearl Sun, Zo Tipp, Shannon Tyo	Playwrights Horizons	World Premiere, a co-production with Playwrights Horizons
2022-2023	The 2022 Pipeline Festival	Writers: Gethsemane Herron-Coward • Jen Goma • Nambi E. Kelley • Haruna Lee • Zizi Majid • Daaimah Mubashshir Directors: • Carolyn Cantor • Chika Ike • Sophiyaa Nayar • Machel Ross • Katharine Wilkinson Producers: Iyvon E • B.J. Evans • Kristin Leahey • Ayana Parker Morrison • Cynthia J. Tong		WP Theater	New York Premiere
2022-2023	Sancocho	by Christin Eve Cato	Zuleyma Guevara, Shirley Rumierk	WP Theater	Off-Broadway Premiere
2022-2023	Space Program: Lightning Rod Special's The Appointment	Lead Artist: Alice Yorke Lead Book Writers: Alice Yorke, Eva Steinmetz, Scott R. Sheppard, and Alex Bechtel Music, Lyrics and Arrangements: Alex Bechtel Director: Eva Steinmetz Composer: Alex Bechtel Choreographer: Melanie Cotton Co-Creators: Katie Gould, Jaime Maseda, Lee Minora, Brett Ashley Robinson and Brenson Thomas	Katie Gould, Jaime Maseda, Lee Minora, Brett Ashley Robinson, Scott R. Sheppard, Alice Yorke, Danny Wilfred	WP Theater	Off-Broadway Premiere WP Space Program Residents: Lightning Rod Special Producers: Renee Blinkwolt, Erica Rotstein, Rachel Sussman
2022-2023	Weightless	an indie rock musical written by The Kilbanes, directed by Tamilla Woodard, choreography by nicHi Douglas	Lila Blue, Kofy Brown, Dan Harris, Kate Kilbane, Dan Moses, Joshua Pollock	WP Theater	Off-Broadway Premiere
2021-2022	sandblasted	by Charly Evon Simpson, directed by Summer L. Williams	Marinda Anderson, Brittany Bellizeare, Andy Lucien, Rolonda Watts	Vineyard Theatre	World Premiere, a co-production with Vineyard Theatre
2021-2022	Welcome Home, or Ten Tiny Snapshots of WP	conceived and created by Rebecca Martínez	contributing artists: Kate Benson, Donnetta Lavinia Grays, and Journey Brown-Saintel, Laylanie Farris, Kziana Flores, Michelan Le'Monier, Alexandria Russell from viBe Theater Experience narration: Soneela Nankani featuring archival audio from: Billie Allen, Kathleen Chalfant, María Irene Fornés, Emily Mann, Julia Miles, Wendy Wasserstein and a few surprises...	WP Theater	World Premiere
2021-2022	Many Happy Returns	created by Monica Bill Barnes & Co.	Monica Bill Barnes, Robbie Saenz de Viteri, Flannery Gregg, Mykel Marai Nairne, Indah Walsh	WP Theater	World Premiere
2020-2021	Weightless	a theatrical concert film by The Kilbanes, directed by Tamilla Woodard	Lila Blue, Kofy Brown, Dan Harris, Kate Kilbane, Dan Moses, Joshua Pollock	Streaming	with support from piece by piece productions
2020-2021	Galatea	by MJ Kaufman, directed by Will Davis	Ty Defoe, Esco Jouléy, Jo Lampert, Pooya Mohseni, Aneesh Sheth, Futaba Shioda, TL Thompson	Streaming	presented in collaboration with Red Bull Theater
2020-2021	Final Boarding Call	by Stefani Kuo, directed by Mei Ann Teo		Streaming	in partnership with Ma-Yi Theater Company
2020-2021	Keep Moving	created by Monica Bill Barnes & Co.	Manuela Agudelo, Monica Bill Barnes, Olivia Brown, Kai Chen, Anakeiry Cruz, Sarah Isoke Days, Katherine De La Cruz, Grace Deane, Nadjie Forte, Reagan Gordon, Kathryn McKenzie, Naja Newell, Esther Nozea, Amanda Konstantine Perlmutter, Julieta Rodriguez-Cruz, Robbie Saenz de Viteri, Lina Sierra, Jessica Son	Streaming	World Premiere
2020-2021	The Nourish Project	conceived and directed by Rebecca Martínez	Natalie Benally, Latrelle Bright, Siobhan Juanita Brown, Camryn Bruno, Sage Chanell, Jono Eiland, Brittany Grier, Joaquin Lopez, Nikiko Masumoto, Megan J. Minturn, Movement of the People Dance Company, Joya Powell, Madeline Sayet, Dr. Michelle Tom, Meghan "Sigvanna" Topkok, Edna Vazquez	Streaming	World Premiere
2020-2021	Lockdown	by Cori Thomas, directed by Kent Gash	Lillian Andrea De León, Reynaldo Piniella, Travis Raeburn, Heather Alicia Simms, Keith Randolph Smith	Streaming	in partnership with Rattlestick Playwrights Theater
2020-2021	Ole White Sugah Daddy	by Obehi Janice, directed by Caitlin Sullivan	Alex Esola, Obehi Janice, Andy Lucien, Natalie Paul, Taji Senior, Greg Stuhr, Madeline Wise	Streaming	in partnership with AYE DEFY
2019-2020	The 2020 Pipeline Festival #pipelineonline	Writers: Vanessa Garcia • Sukari Jones • C. Quintana • Charly Evon Simpson • Bryna Turner Directors: Victoria Collado • Sarah Hughes • Candis C. Jones • Rebecca Martínez • Arpita Mukherjee Producers: Ilana Becker • Marie Cisco • Lucy Jackson • Stephanie Rolland • Alyssa Simmons		WP Theater	New York Premiere
2019-2020	Where We Stand	by Donnetta Lavinia Grays, directed by Tamilla Woodard	Donnetta Lavinia Grays	WP Theater	World Premiere, Off-Broadway Premiere, a co-production with Baltimore Center Stage
2019-2020	Our Dear Dead Drug Lord	by Alexis Scheer, directed by Whitney White	Carmen Berkeley, Daniel Duque-Estrada, Alyssa May Gold, Rebecca Jimenez, Michaela Perez, Matthew Saldivar, Malika Samuel	WP Theater	Off-Broadway Premiere, a co-production with Second Stage Theater, by special arrangement with Benjamin Simpson and Joseph Longhorn
2018-2019	Natural Shocks	by Lauren Gunderson, directed by May Adrales	Pascale Armand	WP Theater	World Premiere
2018-2019	Hurricane Diane	by Madeleine George, directed by Leigh Silverman	Mia Barron, Michelle Beck, Becca Blackwell, Danielle Skraastad, Kate Wetherhead	New York Theatre Workshop	a co-production with New York Theatre Workshop
2018-2019	Hatef**k	By Rehana Lew Mirza, directed by Adrienne Campbell Holt	Kavi Ladnier, Sendhil Ramamurthy	WP Theater	World Premiere, Off Broadway Premiere, a co-production with Colt Coeur
2017–2018	The Pipeline Festival 2018	Writers: Donnetta Lavinia Grays • MJ Kaufman • Sylvia Khoury • Zoe Sarnak • Leah Nanako Winkler Directors: Melissa Crespo • Morgan Gould • Ellie Heyman • Tyne Rafaeli • Mo Zhou Producers: Roxanna Barrios • SallyCade Holmes • Nidia Medina • Laura Ramadei • Yuvika Tolani	Kara Arena, Jordon Bolden, Zeniba Britt, May Calamawy, AnnEliza Canning-Skinner, Chaelon Costello, Bjorn DuPaty, Hennessy, Katie Lee Hill, Tia James, Esco Jouléy, Chalia La Tour, January LaVoy, Eve Lindley, Keren Lugo, Nikki Massoud, Ben Mayne, Pooya Mohseni, Laith Nakli, Bailey Roper, Max Sheldon, Futaba Shioda, Sathya Sridhara, Morgan Sullivan, Babak Tafti, Angela Travino, Michelle Veintimilla, Jade Wu	WP Theater	New York premiere
2017–2018	[PORTO]	By Kate Benson, directed by Lee Sunday Evans	Noel Joseph Allain, Kate Benson, Ugo Chukwu, Jorge Cordova, Leah Karpel, Julia Sirna-Frest	WP Theater	Off-Broadway premiere, a co-production with The Bushwick Starr, in association with New Georges
2017–2018	What We're Up Against	By Theresa Rebeck, directed by Adrienne Campbell-Holt	Skylar Astin, Marg Helgenberger, Jim Parrack, Krysta Rodriguez, Damian Young	WP Theater	Off-Broadway premiere, by special arrangement with Segal NYC Productions
2017–2018	One Night Only (Running As Long As We Can)	Created by Monica Bill Barnes, Anna Bass and Robert Saenz de Viteri	Monica Bill Barnes, Anna Bass, Robert Saenz de Viteri	WP Theater	World premiere, Monica Bill Barnes & Company in association with New Neighborhood
2016–2017	Sundown, Yellow Moon	By Rachel Bonds, music and lyrics by The Bengsons, directed by Anne Kauffman	Eboni Booth, Lilli Cooper, Peter Friedman, Greg Keller, Anne L. Nathan, Michael Pemberton, JD Taylor	WP Theater	World premiere, co-production with Ars Nova
2016–2017	Stuffed	By Lisa Lampanelli, directed by Jackson Gay	Ann Harada, Zainab Jah, Lisa Lampanelli, Jessica Luck	WP Theater	World premiere
2015–2016	The Pipeline Festival 2016	Playwrights: Sarah Burgess, Monet Hurst-Mendoza, Martyna Majok, Riti Sachdeva, Susan Soon He Stanton Directors: Adrienne Campbell-Holt, Lee Sunday Evans, Sarah Krohn, Danya Taymor, Tamilla Woodard Producers: Pearl Hodiwala, Rachel Karpf Reidy, Kristen Luciani, Liz Olson, & Rachel Sussman	Sofiya Akilova, Dahlia Azama, Farah Bala, Purva Bedi, Quincy Tyler Bernstine, Soraya Broukhim, Tommy Crawford, Damon Daunno, Edward Hajj, Dariush Kashani, Teresa Avia Lim, Jessica Love, Paola Lázaro, Marjan Neshat, Larry Pine, Amanda Quaid, Ana Reeder, Kate Rigg, Charles Socarides, Andrea Syglowski, Matthew Van Oss, Rita Wolf	WP Theater	New York premiere
2015–2016	Ironbound	By Martyna Majok, directed by Daniella Topol	Josiah Bania, Shiloh Fernandez, Marin Ireland, Morgan Spector	Rattlestick Playwrights Theater	New York premiere, Drama Desk Nomination for Outstanding Actress, co-production with Rattlestick Playwrights Theater
2015–2016	Dear Elizabeth	By Sarah Ruhl, directed by Kate Whoriskey	Becky Ann Baker, David Aaron Baker, Kathleen Chalfant, Rinde Eckert, Cherry Jones, Mia Katigbak, Ellen McLaughlin, Polly Noonan, Peter Scolari, J. Smith-Cameron, John Douglas Thompson, Harris Yulin	WP Theater	New York premiere
2014–2015	The Undeniable Sound of Right Now	By Laura Eason, directed by Kirsten Kelly	Daniel Abeles, Jeb Brown, Chris Kipiniak, Brian Miskell, Margo Seibert, Lusia Strus	Rattlestick Playwrights Theater	World premiere, co-production with Rattlestick Playwrights Theater
2014–2015	Bright Half Life	By Tanya Barfield, directed by Leigh Silverman	Rebecca Henderson, Rachael Holmes	New York City Center Stage II	World premiere
2014–2015	A Beautiful Day in November on the Banks of the Greatest of the Great Lakes	By Kate Benson, directed by Lee Sunday Evans	Jessica Almasy, Gerry Bamman, Christian Felix, Nina Hellman, Brooke Ishibashi, Mia Katigbak, Kristine Haruna Lee, Hubert Point-Du Jour, Heather Alicia Simms, Ben Williams	New York City Center Stage II	Obie Award Special Citation, New Georges in association with WP Theater
2014–2015	When January Feels Like Summer	By Cori Thomas, directed by Daniella Topol	Dion Graham, Mahira Kakkar, Carter Redwood, Debargo Sanyal, & Maurice Williams	Ensemble Studio Theatre	Co-production with Ensemble Studio Theatre
2013–2014	The Most Deserving	By Catherine Trieschmann, directed by Shelley Butler	Veanne Cox, Kristin Griffith, Adam LeFevre, Jennifer Lim, Daniel Pearce, Ray Anthony Thomas	New York City Center Stage II	New York premiere
2013–2014	The Architecture of Becoming	Conceived & created by the 2012–2014 WP Lab: Elena Araoz, Kara Lee Corthron, Lydia Fort, Sarah Gancher, Virginia Grise, Dipika Guha, Deadria Harrington, Jane Jung, Lauren Keating, Meropi Peponides, Aktina Stathaki, Lauren Yee, Lanie Zipoy	Claudia Acosta, Vanessa Kai, Christopher Livingston, Jon Norman Schneider, Danielle Skraastad	New York City Center Stage II	World premiere
2013–2014	Row After Row	By Jessica Dickey, directed by Daniella Topol	Rosie Benton, Erik Lochtefeld, PJ Sosko	New York City Center Stage II	World premiere
2012–2013	Collapse	By Allison Moore, directed by Jackson Gay	Nadia Bowers, Hannah Cabell, Maurice McRae, Elliot Villar	New York City Center Stage II	New York premiere
2012–2013	Jackie	By Elfriede Jelinek, directed by Tea Alagić, Translated by Gitta Honegger	Tina Benko	New York City Center Stage II	North American premiere
2012–2013	Bethany	By Laura Marks, directed by Gaye Taylor Upchurch	Emily Ackerman, America Ferrera, Kristin Griffith, Ken Marks, Tobias Segal, Myra Lucretia Taylor	New York City Center Stage II	World premiere
2011–2012	We Play for the Gods	Conceived & created by the 2010–2012 WP Lab: Charity Ballard, Alexandra Collier, Elizabeth R. English, Jessi D. Hill, Andrea Kuchlewska, Dominique Morisseau, Kristen Palmer, Sarah Rasmussen, Mia Rovegno, Melisa Tien, Nicole A. Watson, Stephanie Ybarra & Stefanie Zadravec	Annie Golden, Amber Gray, Alexandra Henrikson, Irene Sofia Lucio, Erika Rolfsrud	Cherry Lane Theater	World premiere
2011–2012	How the World Began	By Catherine Trieschmann, directed by Daniella Topol	Justin Kruger, Adam LeFevre, Heidi Schreck	Peter Jay Sharp Theater	New York premiere, Produced in association with South Coast Repertory, Recipient of a 2011 Edgerton Foundation New American Play Award
2011–2012	Milk Like Sugar	By Kirsten Greenidge, directed by Rebecca Taichman	Cherise Boothe, Angela Lewis, Nikiya Mathis, LeRoy McClain, J. Mallory McCree, Adrienne C. Moore, Tonya Pinkins	Peter Jay Sharp Theater	Co-Produced by Playwrights Horizons & La Jolla Playhouse, Obie Awards: Playwriting-Kristen Greenidge, Performance-Cherise Boothe
2010–2011	Room	Based on the writings of Virginia Woolf, directed by Anne Bogart, Adapted by Jocelyn Clarke	Ellen Lauren	Julia Miles Theater	
2010–2011	Apple Cove	By Lynn Rosen, directed by Giovanna Sardelli	Paul Carlin, Erin Gann, Allison Mack, Dion Mucciacito, Kathy Searle	Julia Miles Theater	New York premiere
2009–2010	Lascivious Something	By Sheila Callaghan, directed by Daniella Topol	Rob Campbell, Dana Eskelson, Ronete Levenson, Elisabeth Waterston	Julia Miles Theater	World premiere
2009–2010	Smudge	By Rachel Axler, directed by Pam MacKinnon	Cassie Beck, Greg Keller, Brian Sgambati	Julia Miles Theater	World premiere
2009–2010	Or,	By Liz Duffy Adams, directed by Wendy McClellan	Kelly Hutchinson, Andy Paris, Maggie Siff	Julia Miles Theater	World premiere
2008–2009	Global Cooling: The Women Chill	Conceived & created by the 2008–2010 WP Lab: Bekah Brunstetter, Alexis Clements, Charity Henson-Ballard, Kara Manning, Lynn Rosen, Crystal Skillman, Andrea Thome, Heidi Carlsen, Linsay Firman, Susanna Gellert, Wendy McClellan, Donya K. Washington Diane Alianiello, Heather Cohn, Jennifer Conley Darling, Aimee Davis, Amanda Feldman, Marissa Rosenblum & Allegra Schorr, musical direction by Matt Castle, choreography by Elizabeth Montgomery, visual art installation by Annie Boyden Varnot & Elizabeth Ferrer	B. Brian Argotsinger, Casey Boyle, Addie Brownlee, Jorge Cordova, Kibibi Dillon, Danielle Famble, Richard Gallagher, Laura Gilbert, Rebecca Henderson, Sarah Hillmon, Beth Kirkpatrick, Julie Kline, Toby Knops, Russell Stuart Lilie, Rebecca Lingafelter, Bryony Lucas, Dominique Morisseau, Ned Noyes, Lance Olds, Allie Pfeffer, Haas Regen, Angel R. Rodriguez, Phoebe Rose Sandford, Myxolydia	World Financial Center	World premiere co-presented by arts>World Financial Center
2008–2009	Freshwater	By Virginia Woolf, directed by Anne Bogart	Akiko Aizawa, Gian-Murray Gianino, Ellen Lauren, Kelly Maurer, Tom Nelis, Barney O'Hanlon, Stephen Duff Webber	Julia Miles Theater	World premiere co-produced with SITI Company
2008–2009	Aliens with Extraordinary Skills	By Saviana Stănescu, directed by Tea Alagić	Shirine Babb, Seth Fisher, Gian-Murray Gianino, Kevin Isola, Jessica Pimentel, Marnye Young	Julia Miles Theater	World premiere
2007–2008	Corporate Carnival	Conceived & Created by Megan E. Carter, Julie Crosby, Jyana S. Gregory & the Performers, directed by Jyana S. Gregory, Text by Andy Paris	David Anzuelo, Karen Grenke, Andrew Grusetskie, Andy Paris, Richard Saudek, Meghan Williams, Lisa Rafaela Clair, Prudence Heyert, Megan Raye Manzi, Austin Sanders, Jeff Wills	World Financial Center	World premiere co-presented by arts>World Financial Center
2007–2008	Crooked	By Catherine Trieschmann, directed by Liz Diamond	Betsy Aidem, Carmen M. Herlihy, Cristin Milioti	Julia Miles Theater	American premiere
2007–2008	Sand	By Trista Baldwin, directed by Daniella Topol	Alec Beard, Angela Lewis, Pedro Pascal	Julia Miles Theater	World premiere
2006–2007	Girls Just Wanna Have Fund$	Conceived & created by the 2006–2008 WP Lab: May Adrales, Gia Forakis, Leigh Goldenberg, Christina Gorman, Maria Goyanes, Jyana Gregory, Karen Grenke, Katori Hall, Amy Kaissar Andrea Lepcio, Patricia McNamara, Linda Powell, Molly Rice, Saviana Stanescu, Joy Tomasko & Kim Weild	Chriselle Almeida, Addie Brownlee, Davina Cohen, Ginger Eckert, Edwina Findley, LeeAnne Hutchison, Khris Lewin, Anthony Manna, KK Moggie, Sara Moore, Dominique Morisseau, Sarah Murphy, Tamilla Woodard	World Financial Center	World premiere co-presented by arts>World Financial Center
2006–2007	Transfigures	Conceived & Directed by Lear deBessonet, Text by Bathsheba Doran, Charles Mee, Erin Sax Seymour, Russell Shorto, Joan of Arc & Henrik Ibsen, Choreographed by Andrea Haenggi	David Adkins, Dylan Dawson, Juliana Francis, Nate Schenkkan, T. Ryder Smith, Marguerite Stimpson	Julia Miles Theater	
2006–2007	Victoria Martin: Math Team Queen	By Kathryn Walat, directed by Loretta Greco	Jessi Campbell, Zachary Booth, Adam Farabee, Tobias Segal, Matthew Stadelmann	Julia Miles Theater	World premiere
2005–2006	The Cataract	By Lisa D'Amour, directed by Katie Pearl	Vanessa Aspillaga, Barnaby Carpenter, Tug Coker, Kelly McAndrew	Julia Miles Theater	New York premiere
2005–2006	Jump/Cut	By Neena Beber, directed by Leigh Silverman	Michi Barall, Luke Kirby, Thomas Sadoski	Julia Miles Theater	New York premiere
2004–2005	Inky	By Rinne Groff, directed by Loretta Greco	Jessi Campbell, Marianne Hagan, Jason Pugatch, Elizabeth Schweitzer	Julia Miles Theater	World premiere
2004–2005	Best of Both Worlds	Book & lyrics by Randy Weiner, music by Diedre Murray, co-written and directed by Diane Paulus	Jeannette Bayardelle, Ronnell Bey, William Scott Davison, Shaun Hoggs, Charles R. King Jr., Griffin Matthews, Kenita R. Miller, Richard E. Waits	Julia Miles Theater	World premiere
2004–2005	Antigone Project	By Tanya Barfield, Karen Hartman, Chiori Miyagawa, Lynn Nottage & Caridad Svich, directed by Annie Dorsen, Dana I. Harrel, Anne Kauffman, Barbara Rubin & Liesl Tommy	Joey Collins, Angel Desai, Jeanine Serralles, Desean Terry, April Yvette Thompson, Tracie Thoms	Julia Miles Theater	World premiere
2003–2004	William Wharton's Birdy	Adapted for the stage by Naomi Wallace, directed by Lisa Peterson	Richard Bekins, Teagle F. Bougere, Zachary Knighton, Adam Rothenberg, Ted Schneider, Peter Stadlen	Julia Miles Theater	
2003–2004	Touch	By Toni Press-Coffman, directed by Loretta Greco	Michele Ammon, Matthew Del Negro, Tom Everett Scott, Yetta Gottesman	Julia Miles Theater	
2002–2003	Cheat	By Julie Jensen, directed by Joan Vail Thorne	Lucy Deakins, Shayna Ferm, Kevin O'Rourke, Karen Young	Julia Miles Theater	
2002–2003	The Women of Lockerbie	By Deborah Brevoort, directed by Scott Elliott	Kathleen Doyle, Judith Ivey, Angela Pietropinto, Larry Pine, Kristen Sieh, Jenny Sterlin, Adam Trese	The Theater at St. Clements	World premiere, co-production with The New Group
2001–2002	Carson McCullers (Historically Inaccurate)	By Sarah Schulman, directed by Marion McClinton	Jenny Bacon, Michi Barall, Rosalyn Coleman, Barbara Eda-Young, Leland Gantt, Tim Hopper, Ben Shenkman, Rick Stear, Anne Torsiglieri	Julia Miles Theater	Co-produced with Playwrights Horizons
2000–2001	O Pioneers!	Adaptation and lyrics by Darrah Cloud, from the novel by Willa Cather, music by Kim D. Sherman, directed by Richard Corley	Beth Bartley, Corey Behnke, Todd Cerveris, Elliot Dash, Joe Domencic, Michael Thomas Holmes, Matt Hoverman, Grace Hsu, Greg Jackson, Royden Mills, Evan Robertson, Erika Rolfsrud, Michele Tauber, Jonathan Uffelman	Julia Miles Theater	
2000–2001	Saint Lucy's Eyes	By Bridgette A. Wimberly, directed by Billie Allen	Ruby Dee, Willis Burks II, Toks Olagundoye, Sally A. Stewart	Julia Miles Theater	
2000–2001	Leaving Queens	Book and lyrics by Kate Moira Ryan, music by Kim D. Sherman, directed by Allison Narver	Alexander Bonnin, Sean Dooley, Jim Jacobson, Paul Niebanck, Cynthia Sophiea, Barbara Tirrell, Alice Vienneau	Julia Miles Theater	
2000–2001	Hard Feelings	By Neena Beber, directed by Maria Mileaf	Guy Boyd, Mary Fogarty, Kate Jennings Grant, Pamela Gray, Seana Kofoed	Julia Miles Theater	
1999–2000	Two-Headed	By Julie Jensen, directed by Joan Vail Thorne	Lizbeth Mackay, Deirdre O'Connell	Julia Miles Theater	
1999–2000	Our Place in Time	By Clare Coss, directed by Bryna Wortman	Gina Bardwell, Elizabeth Hess, Jacqueline Knapp, Norman Maxwell	Julia Miles Theater	
1999–2000	Gum	By Karen Hartman, directed by Loretta Greco	Firdous Bamji, Angel Desai, Lizan Mitchell, Juan Rivera-Lebrón, Daphne Rubin-Veg	Julia Miles Theater	
1998–1999	The Exact Center of the Universe	By Joan Vail Thorne, directed by John Tillinger	Frances Sternhagen, Reed Birney, Bethel Leslie, Marge Redmond, Tracy Thorne	Julia Miles Theater	
1998–1999	The Chemistry of Change	By Marlane Meyer, directed by Lisa Peterson	Carlin Glynn, Christopher Innvar, Hamish Linklater, Larry Pine, Barry Del Sherman, Jodi Thelen, Brenda Wehle	Julia Miles Theater	Co-produced with Playwrights Horizons
1998–1999	The Knee Desires the Dirt	By Julie Hébert, directed by Susana Tubert	Reed Birney, Lynn Cohen, Al Espinosa, Barbara Gulan, Sarah Rose	Julia Miles Theater	
1997–1998	The Summer in Gossensass	Written and directed by María Irene Fornés	Daniel Blinkoff, Joseph Goodrich, Molly Powell, Clea Rivera, Valda Setterfield	Judith Anderson Theater	World premiere
1997–1998	Phaedra in Delirium	By Susan Yankowitz, directed by Alison Summers	Kathleen Chalfant, Peter Jay Fernandez, Sandra Shipley	13th Street Theater	Co-produced with Classic Stage Company
1997–1998	The Water Children	By Wendy MacLeod, directed by David Petrarca	Elizabeth Bunch, Kevin Isola, Deirdre Lovejoy, Wendy Makkena, Michael Mastro, Joyce Reehling, Robert Sella, Jonathan Walker	Playwrights Horizons Studio Theater	Co-produced with Playwrights Horizons
1996–1997	Under a Western Sky	By Amparo Garcia, directed by Loretta Greco	Irma Bello, Gilbert Cruz, Sol Miranda, Felix Solis	INTAR Theatre	Co-produced with INTAR Theatre
1996–1997	TerraIncognita	Written and directed by María Irene Fornés	Jennifer Alagna, Lawrence Craig, John Muriello, Matthew Perri, Candace Rogers-O'Connor	INTAR Theatre	World premiere, co-produced with INTAR Theatre
1996–1997	Go Go Go	Written by Juliana Francis, directed by Anne Bogart	Juliana Francis	PS 122	
1995–1996	Crocodiles in the Potomac	By Wendy Belden, directed by Suzanne Bennett	Firdous Bamji, Brad Bellamy, Gretchen Egolf, Kristin Griffith, Tristine Skyler	Theatre Row	
1995–1996	The Big Window	By Kate Browne, music by Linda Dowdell, directed by Joan Vail Thorne	Brian Anderson, Ron Bagden, Charles Fornara, Kay Gaynor, Karen Goldfeder, Kim Grogg, Adam Marshall, Kate Mayfield, Elinore O'Connell, Joyce Sozen		
1994–1995	The Last Girl Singer	By Deborah Grace Winer, directed by Charles Maryan	Kelly Bishop, Charlotte Maier, Bill Tatum	Kampo Cultural Center	
1994–1995	Why We Have a Body	By Claire Chafee, directed by Evan Yionoulis	Jayne Atkinson, Trish Hawkins, Deborah Hedwall, Nancy Hower	Judith Anderson Theater	
1993–1994	The Autobiography of Aiken Fiction	By Kate Moira Ryan, directed by Adrienne Weiss	Drew Barr, Julie Dretzin, Jennifer Dundas, Sylvia Gassell, Cristine McMurdo-Wallis	Samuel Beckett Theater	
1993–1994	Black	By Joyce Carol Oates, directed by Tom Palumbo	Kristin Griffith, Jonathan Earl Peck, John Wojda	INTAR Theatre	
1993–1994	Eating Chicken Feet	By Kitty Chen, directed by Kati Kuroda	Christine Campbell, Wai Ching Ho, Mary Lee, Ben Lin, Liana Pai, Steve Park, Bobby Sacher	Playhouse 46	
1993–1994	A Melting Season	By Sharon Houck Ross, directed by Mary Beth Easley, music composed and performed by Mark Bruckner	Mark Bruckner, Divana Cook, Marceline Hugot, Kevin Jeffries, Dawn Litel, Colleen Quinn, E. Claude Richards, Marta Vidal	Clark Studio Theatre	
1992–1993	The Brooklyn Trojan Women	By Carole Braverman, directed by Margot Breier	Adam Barnett, Ariane Brandt, Stephanie Clayman, Joanna Merlin, Lucille Rivin	45th Street Theater	
1992–1993	You Could Be Home Now	Written and Performed by Ann Magnuson, Composed by Tom Judson, directed by David Schweizer	Ann Magnuson	Joseph Papp Public Theatre/ Martinson Hall	
1992–1993	Frida: The Story of Frida Kahlo	By Hilary Blecher, lyrics and monologues by Migdalia Cruz, music by Robert Rodriguez	Chris Fields, William Rhodes, Helen Schneider, Byron Utley, Andrew Vareia	Brooklyn Academy of Music	
1991–1992	Dream of a Common Language	By Heather McDonald, directed by Liz Diamond	Caris Corfman, Mia Katigbak, Mary Mara, J.R. Nutt, Joseph Siravo, Rocco Sisto	Judith Anderson Theater	
1991–1992	Chain/The Late Bus to Mecca	By Pearl Cleage, directed by Imani	Karen Malina White, Claire Dorsey, Kim Yancy	Judith Anderson Theater	
1991–1992	Lardo Weeping	Written and Performed by Terry Galloway, directed by Donna Marie Nudd	Terry Galloway	PS 122	
1991–1992	Approximating Mother	By Kathleen Tolan, directed by Gloria Muzio	Mia Dillon, Shawana Kemp, Deirdre O'Connell, Tonya Pinkins, Richard Poe, Steven Ryan, Ali Thomas	Judith Anderson Theater	
1990–1991	Night Sky	By Susan Yankowitz, directed by Joseph Chaikin	Edward Baran, Tom Cayler, Joan MacIntosh, Aleta Mitchell, Paul Zimet, Lizabeth Zindel	Judith Anderson Theater	
1990–1991	Maggie and Misha	By Gail Sheehy, directed by Julianne Boyd	George Morfogen, Carol Shelly, Victor Steinbach, Ching Valdes-Aran	Vineyard Theatre	
1990–1991	The Encanto File and Other Short Plays	Plays by Rosa Lowinger, Marlane Meyer, Sally Nemeth, Mary Sue Price, & Caridad Svich, directed by Melia Bensussen, Melanie Joseph, Susana Tubert	Dana Bate, Divina Cook, Dorrie Joiner, Thomas Kopache, Wendy Lawless, Patrick McNellis, Faye M. Price, Cliff Weissman	Judith Anderson Theater	
1990–1991	Day Trips	By Jo Carson, directed by Billie Allen	Linda Atkinson, Beth Dixon, Helen Stenborg	Judith Anderson Theater	
1989–1990	Tales of the Lost Formicans	By Constance Congdon, directed by Gordon Edelstein	Michael Countryman, Noel Derecki, Lizbeth Mackay, Deirdre O'Connell, Rosemary Prinz, Fred Sanders, Edward Seamon	Apple Corps Theater	
1989–1990	Violent Peace	By Lavonne Mueller, directed by Bryna Wortman	Dennis Parlato, Jenny Robertson	Apple Corps Theater	
1989–1990	Mill Fire	By Sally Nemeth, directed by David Petrarca	Kate Buddeke, Kelly Coffield Park, Timothy Grimm, B.J. Jones, James Krag, Martha Lavey, Paul Mabon, Mary Ann Thebus, Jacqueline Williams	Apple Corps Theater	
1988–1989	Ladies	By Eve Ensler, music by Joshua Schneider, directed by Paul Walker	Margaret Barker, Denise Delapenha, Alexandra Gersten-Vassilaros, Allison Janney, Marcella Lowery, Isabella Monk, Novella Nelson, Ching Valdes-Aran, Beverly Wideman	The Theater at St. Clements	
1988–1989	Niedecker	By Kristine Thatcher, directed by Julianne Boyd	Mary Diveny, Jane Fleiss, Frederick Neumann, Helen Stenborg	Apple Corps Theater	
1988–1989	Ma Rose	By Cassandra Medley, directed by Irving Vincent	Rosanna Carter, Herb Lovelle, Lizan Mitchell, LaTanya Richardson Jackson, Pawnee Sills	Apple Corps Theater	
1987–1988	Etta Jenks	By Marlane Meyer, directed by Robert Levitow	Sheila Dabney, Abdul Salaam El Razzac, Carmine Iannaccone, John Nesci, Deirdre O'Connell, John Pappas, Ebbe Roe Smith, Dendrie Taylor, Ching Valdes-Aran	Apple Corps Theater	
1987–1988	Reverend Jenkins' Almost All Colored Orphanage Band	By Gail Kriegel, Original music and arrangements by Luther Henderson, directed by Vernel Bagneris	Terri Dobins, Renee Ezell, Miranda Jennings, Jeneen Jones, Pamela Johnson, Coby Johnson, Elliot Keener, Warren Kenner, Clyde Kerr Jr., Nicholas Payton, Skip McGee, Gregory Stafford, Patrick Sturgis, Carol Sutton, Harold Sylvester, Barbara Tasker	Le Petit Theatre du Vieux Carre	
1987–1988	Abingdon Square	Written and directed by María Irene Fornés	Myra Carter, Michael Cerveris, John Cullum, Anna Levine, Madeleine Potter, John Seitz	The American Place Theatre	World premiere, Obie Award: Best New American Play
1987–1988	The Snicker Factory: An Evening of Political Satire	Conceived and directed by Suzanne Bennett and Liz Diamond, music composed and directed by Adrienne Torf, written by Billy Aronson, William Boardman, Cynthia Cooper, Holly Hughes, Lavonne Mueller, Michael Quinn, Jack Shannon, Y. York	Edward Baran, Alma Cuervo, Nancy Giles, Anderson Matthews, Joseph C. Phillips	The American Place Theatre	
1986–1987	Consequence	By Kat Smith, directed by Alma Becker	Didi Conn, Tino Juarez, Geraldine Librandi, Joan MacIntosh	The American Place Theatre	
1985–1986	Breaking the Prairie Wolf Code	By Lavonne Mueller, directed by Liz Diamond	Judith Barcroft, Robert Black, James Lally, Novella Nelson, Keliher Walsh, Tenney Walsh	The American Place Theatre	
1985–1986	Women Heroes: In Praise of Exceptional Women	Colette in Love by Lavonne Mueller, directed by Mirra Bank; Emma Goldman by Jessica Litwak, directed by Anne Bogart; How She Played the Game by Cynthia Cooper, directed by Bryna Wortman; Millie by Susan Kander, directed by Carol Tanzman; Parallax: In Praise of Daisy Bates Written and directed by Denise Hamilton; Personality by Gina Wendkos and Ellen Ratner, directed by Gina Wendkos and Richard Press	John Connolly, Shirley Knight, Jessica Litwak, Ellen Ratner, Michele Shay, Susan Stevens	Samuel Beckett Theatre	
1984–1985	Paducah	By Sallie Bingham, directed by Joan Vail Thorne	William Cain, Tammy Grimes, Laura Hicks, Carrie Nye, Lou Myers	The American Place Theatre	
1984–1985	Four Corners	Conceived, directed and designed by Gina Wendkos, co-written by Gina Wendkos and Donna Bond	Ryan Cutrona, Josh Hamilton, Margaret Harrington	The American Place Theatre	
1983–1984	A...My Name is Alice	Conceived and directed by Joan Micklin Silver & Julianne Boyd; sketches and songs by Maggie Benson, Susan Birkenhead, David Crane, Carol Hall, Cheryl Hardwick, Georgia Holof, Winnie Holzman, Doug Katsaros, Marta Kauffman, Stephen Lawrence, Anne Meara, David Mettee, Mark Saltzman, Lucy Simon, Steve Tesich, Don Tucker, and David Zippel	Roo Brown, Randy Graff, Mary Gordon Murray, Alaina Reed, Charlaine Woodard	The American Place Theatre	World premiere, Outer Critics Circle Award for Best Revue
1983–1984	To Heaven in a Swing and Festival of One Act Plays	To Heaven in a Swing by Katharine Houghton, directed by Joan Vail Thorne; Candy & Shelley Go to the Desert by Paula Cizmar, directed by Carey Perloff; Old Wives Tale by Julie Jensen, directed by Alma Becker; The Longest Walk by Janet Thomas, directed by Claudia Weill; The Only Woman General by Lavonne Mueller, directed by Bryna Wortman; Special Family Things by Ara Watson and Mary Gallagher, directed by Page Burkholder	Garrett M. Brown, Frances Chaney, Sharon Chatten, Donna Davis, Colleen Dewhurst, Sol Frieder, Lisa Goodman, Katharine Houghton, Kenna Hunt, Lois Smith, Helen Stenborg, Mary Catherine Wright	The American Place Theatre	
1982–1983	Territorial Rites	By Carol K. Mack, directed by Josephine Abady	Michael Gross, Robin Groves, Kim Hunter, Penelope Milford	The American Place Theatre	
1982–1983	Heart of a Dog	Written and Performed by Terry Galloway, directed by Suzanne Bennett	Terry Galloway	The American Place Theatre	
1982–1983	Little Victories	By Lavonne Mueller, directed by Bryna Wortman	Caroline Kava, Linda Hunt, Terrance Markovich, Bill Cwikowski, Jimmy Smits, John Griesemer, Randy Spence	The American Place Theatre	
1981–1982	The Brothers	By Kathleen Collins, directed by Billie Allen	Trazana Beverley, Leila Danette, Duane Jones, Janet League, Josephine Premice, Marie Thomas, Seret Scott	The American Place Theatre	
1981–1982	The Death of a Miner	By Paula Cizmar, directed by Barbara Rosoff	Ritch Brinkley, Dave Florek, Douglas Gower, John Griesemer, Kristen Jolliff, Steven Loring, Margaret MacLeod, Mary McDonnell, Sarah Jessica Parker, Shaw Purnell, Cotter Smith	The American Place Theatre	
1980–1981	Constance and the Musician	Book and lyrics by Caroline Kava, music by Mel Marvin, directed by Joan Micklin Silver	Jeff Brooks, Marilyn Caskey, Philip Casnoff, M'el Dowd, Caroline Kava, Mel Marvin, Stan Wilson	The American Place Theatre	
1980–1981	Still Life	Written and directed by Emily Mann	Mary McDonnell, Timothy Near, John Spencer	The American Place Theatre	Obie Awards: Best Production, Performance – Mary McDonnell, Performance – Timothy Near, Performance – John Spencer
1980–1981	After the Revolution	By Nadja Tesich, directed by Joyce Aaron	Lily Knight, Karen Ludwig, John Nesci, Will Patton, Joe Ponazecki, Ebbe Roe Smith, Lydia Stryk	The American Place Theatre	
1979–1980	Personals	By Rose Leiman Goldemberg, directed by Julianne Boyd	Cynthia Bostick, Stephen Mellor, Molly Regan	The American Place Theatre	
1979–1980	Milk of Paradise	By Sallie Bingham, directed by Joan Vail Thorne	David Bailey, Verona Barnes, Tom Brennan, Paul Carlin, Maia Danziger, Birdie M. Hale, Theresa Merritt, Annie Murray, Patricia Roe, Sylvia Short	The American Place Theatre	
1979–1980	Holy Places	By Gail Kriegel Mallin, directed by Victoria Rue	Joyce Aaron, Clifford David, Tresa Hughes, Bill Randolph	The American Place Theatre	
1978–1979	Letters Home	By Rose Leiman Goldemberg, directed by Dorothy Silver	Doris Belack, Mary McDonnell	The American Place Theatre	
1978–1979	Warriors from a Long Childhood	By Lavonne Mueller, directed by Betsy Shevey	Peter Friedman, Michael Kaufman, Peter Phillips, Mark Soper	The American Place Theatre	
1978–1979	Signs of Life	By Joan Schenkar, directed by Esther Herbst	Kathleen Chalfant, Ethan Kane Dufault, Gwyllum Evans, Kathleen Gittel, Barton Heyman, Barbara Le Brun, Nancy Mainguy, K. Lype O'Dell, Susan Stevens, Lisa Rifkin, Caroline Thomas	The American Place Theatre	
1978–1979	Choices	Conceived by Patricia Bosworth, Adapted by Patricia Bosworth, Caymichael Patten & Lily Lodge, directed by Caymichael Patten	Lily Lodge	The American Place Theatre	
