= Rutka (musical) =

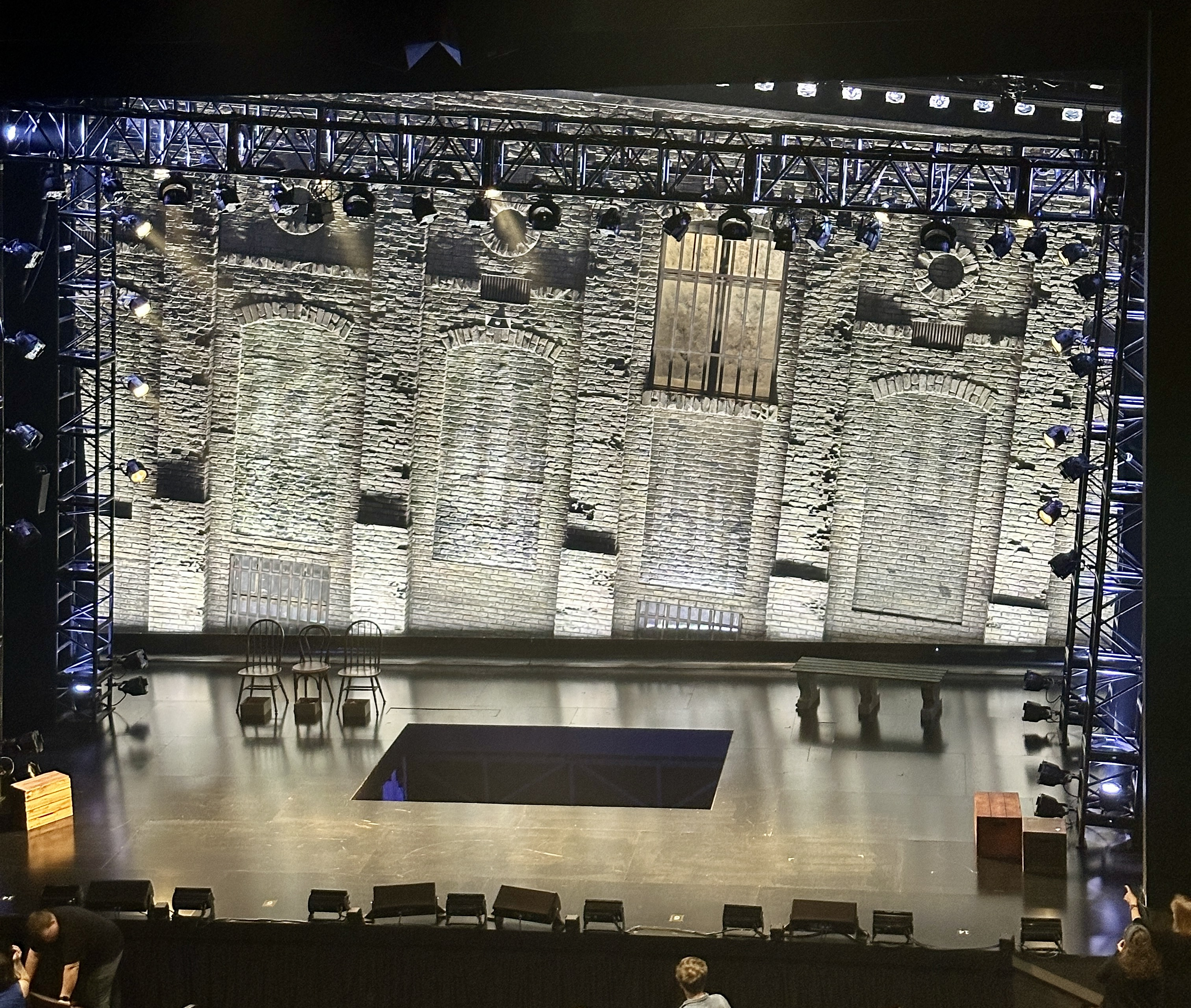
- Cincinnati set in 2024
- Music: Jocelyn Mackenzie and Jeremy Lloyd Styles
- Lyrics: Jocelyn Mackenzie and Jeremy Lloyd Styles
- Book: Neena Beber
- Setting: 1943 Poland
- Premiere: 13 October 2024: Cincinnati Playhouse in the Park

Rutka is an indie rock musical with a book by Neena Beber and music and lyrics by Jocelyn Mackenzie and Jeremy Lloyd Styles. It is based on the diary of Rutka Laskier.

== Premise ==
In 1943, 14-year-old Rutka Laskier, living in the Jewish ghetto in Nazi-occupied Będzin, Poland, writes in her diary about typical teenage concerns.

== Development ==
This musical is based on Rutka’s Notebook: A Voice from the Holocaust, the diary by Laskier over the course of three months of 1943 while living in the Jewish ghetto in Będzin. The diary remained hidden until 2006.

The original book was by Sarah Gancher but later was credited to Neena Beber. Music and lyrics are by Jocelyn Mackenzie and Jeremy Lloyd Styles of Pearl and the Beard. The musical style is indie rock.

== Production ==
The musical had two workshops, including a concert performance in January 2023 at Lincoln Center's New York Public Library for the Performing Arts.

The musical had its world premiere in a pre-Broadway tryout 13 October 2024 at Cincinnati's Playhouse in the Park and opened 17 October, with a planned run through 10 November. It was directed by Wendy C. Goldberg with set design by Todd Rosenthal.

== Reception ==
Laura Collins-Hughes, writing in The New York Times in September 2024, listed it among "15 Shows to See on Stages Around the U.S. This Fall". The Business Journal called it "emotional, bittersweet and intense". City Beat called the score "energetic and uplifting".
