= Ma Rose =

1988 play by Cassandra Medley

- Samuel French cover art
- Written by: Cassandra Medley
- Characters: Ma Rose; Rosa; Vera; Ethel; Wayman
- Original language: English
- Subject: Intergenerational trauma, memory, spirituality
- Genre: Fantastical realism
- Setting: A small midwestern town Early December, 1980

Premiere
- Date premiered: October 11, 1988
- Place premiered: Ensemble Studio Theatre (1986); Women's Project Theater (1988); Eureka Theatre Company (1990)

Ma Rose is a play by Cassandra Medley. Originally produced as a one-act at the Ensemble Studio Theatre in June, 1986, the full-length play premiered Off-Broadway at Women's Project Theater in October, 1988. The following year, the play made its regional premiere at Eureka Theatre Company in San Francisco. Ma Rose was a 1989 finalist for the Susan Smith Blackburn Prize.

The play explores Ma Rose, an aging Black matriarch who experiences visions that blur the lines between reality and the spiritual. Her children, concerned about her mental state, attempt to intervene, leading to familial tensions. The narrative delves into themes of memory, generational trauma, and the complexities of familial relationships.

== Plot ==
Set in the American Midwest, the play centers on Ma Rose, the aging matriarch who begins experiencing visions and communicating with ancestors. While her children view these episodes as signs of senility, Ma Rose perceives them as opportunities to gain wisdom and make amends for past transgressions. The narrative unfolds as Ma Rose's children attempt to intervene in her life, leading to a familial power struggle. Her favorite granddaughter, Rosa, a successful executive in New York, is summoned home to mediate the situation. Caught between her mother's desire for independence and her family's concerns, Rosa becomes a pivotal figure in the unfolding drama. Through a blend of present-day events and memories, the play explores themes of autonomy, legacy, and the enduring bonds of family.

== Characters ==
- Ma Rose, an elderly Black woman in her 90's.
- Rosa, Ma Rose's daughter, a light-skinned Black woman, 55-60.
- Vera, Rosa's daughter, dark-skinned, mid 30's, a very fashionable business woman.
- Wayman, Ma Rose's son, 65.
- Ethel, Wayman's wife, 55-60.

== Production history ==
=== Ensemble Studio Theatre ===
Ma Rose was first produced as a one-act in June of 1986, programmed as part Series C of the Ensemble Studio Theater's Marathon of One-Act Plays. Directed by Irving Vincent, featuring a cast of Mary Alice, Rosanna Carter, Pawnee Sills, and Herb Lovelle. the creative team included Daniel Proett (sets), Greg MacPherson (lights), Bruce Ellman (sound) and Martha Hally (costumes). In a review for The New York Times, drama critic D. J. R. Bruckner noted "The characters in Cassandra Medley's Ma Rose are so attractive that one would like to know them in a much longer play."

The following year, Julia Miles commissioned a full-length version of the play.

=== Women's Project Theater ===
The full-length version of Ma Rose was produced by Women's Project Theater and played Off-Broadway at the Linda Gross Theater, from October 11 - 30, 1988. Directed by Irving Vincent, the cast featured Rosanna Carter, Herb Lovelle, Lizan Mitchell, LaTanya Richardson Jackson, Pawnee Sills. The creative team included Phillip Baldwin (sets), Judy Dearing (costumes), Pat Dignan (lighting), and Aural Fixation (sound).

=== Eureka Theatre Company ===
Ma Rose had its Regional premiere in 1989 at Eureka Theatre Company in San Francisco. Directed by Suzanne Bennett, the cast featured Margarette Robinson, Cynthia L. Robinson, Judith Moreland, Esther Scott, and Melvin Thompson. The creative team included Pamela S. Peniston (sets), Jim Quinn (lights), J.A. Deane (sound), Allison Connor (costumes), and Antonia R. Sheller (props).

Ma Rose was subsequently published by Samuel French, and has been performed across the United States.

== Reception ==
The play's Off-Broadway and San Francisco runs received critical acclaim, with particular praise for Medley's writing, the design team(s), and the ensemble of actors. In reviewing the Ensemble Studio Theatre production D. J. R. Bruckner of The New York Times noted,

''Ma Rose is rich with insights into the (not invariably benign) power of continuity in families... Miss Medley reveals the complex ties among the women so naturally and subtly that the great range of history she surveys - of American families, blacks since the Civil War and women in the last 100 years - becomes a simple story. Every character grows from the first moment to the last and the action is swift and inevitable. While the story is serious, the play is filled with laughter. Arguments can start hilariously and then rise to a shattering pitch in moments without a hint of contrivance. And one character, Wayman's wife, Ethel, is a creation of comic genius, a woman who tells everyone else's stories for them and steals lines from them with the best will in the world. The casting is inspired, especially in the assignment of the powerful roles of Ma Rose and Vera-Rose.

In reviewing the Women's Project Theater production The New York Post deemed Ma Rose "a warmly funny play." In reviewing the Eureka Theatre Company production for the Bay Area Reporter, Noreen C. Barnes noted "Ma Rose is a warm, wise, and ultimately very moving work that exposes the intricacies of life and the contradictions of character in its many textures: comic, painful, familiar, distanced. In it we recognize our own histories, as we, like Rosa Oudith Moreland) all come to terms with our families while attempting to establish our own identities, and free ourselves from inherited pain." The San Francisco Examiner offered similar praise, likening Medley's titular heroine to "a Black Queen Lear."

== Awards ==
Year	Association	Category	Recipient	Result	Ref.
1988	Susan Smith Blackburn Prize	Best Drama	Cassandra Medley	Shortlisted	
