= Tomorrowland (play) =

Play written by Neena Beber

- Original language: English
- Written by: Neena Beber
- Characters: Anna; Wyatt; Emily; Carl; Vicki; Rodger; Del
- Subject: Consumerism, Disneyfication, Existentialism
- Genre: Comedy
- Setting: Orlando, Florida, U.S.

Premiere
- Date: November, 1996
- Place: New Georges & Soho Rep, New York City

Tomorrowland is a play by Neena Beber. Originally premiering Off-Broadway with New Georges at Soho Rep in November 1996. Directed by Maria Mileaf, the cast featured Taro Alexander, Penny Balfour, Julie Dretzin, Anthony Lamont, Alyson Kirk, Julia Mueller, and Frank Wood.

Tomorrowland had its regional premiere at Theater J in Washington, D.C. in a production directed by Wendy C. Goldberg. The play had its West Coast premiere with Signal Theatre Company at 450 Geary Studio Theatre in San Francisco. The play was later published/licensed by Samuel French, Inc.

== Plot ==
A young writer named Anna has recently dropped out of her PhD program, where she was studying the works of Virginia Woolf, to take a job as a staff writer on a children's television series that shoots in Orlando, Florida. Hoping to enter an economically stable and creatively fulfilling adult life, she instead finds herself immersed in a disorienting environment shaped by commercial entertainment and the spectacles of the theme-park industry. As Anna adjust to her new workplace, she encounters an array of characters whose lives and identities blur the boundaries between performance and reality. Her experience grow increasingly surreal as she confronts the contradictions between authenticity and illusion. Through a series of episodic encounters, Anna grapples with questions of purpose, identity, and inevitably, of death, struggling to find meaning in a culture that prioritizes youth and fantasy.

== Characters ==
- Anna
- Wyatt
- Emily
- Carl
- Vicki
- Rodger
- Del

== Productions ==
=== New York ===
Tomorrowland had its World Premiere Off-Broadway with New Georges at Soho Repertory Theatre in November 1996. Directed by Maria Mileaf, the cast featured Taro Alexander, Penny Balfour, Julie Dretzin, Anthony Lamont, Alyson Kirk, Julia Mueller, and Frank Wood. The creative team included Neil Patel (sets), Moe Schell (costumes), Lenore Doxsee (lights), and Laura Grace Brown (sound).

=== Washington, D.C. ===
Tomorrowland had its Regional premiere at Theater J, in a co-production with Horizon Theatre Company, running from April 12 through May 9, 1999. Directed by Wendy C. Goldberg, the cast featured Janine Barris-Gerstl, Kit Young, Brook Butterworth, Maureen Kerrigan, Michael Jerome Johnson, and Elizabeth Kitsos. The creative team included Carl Gudenius (sets), Stacy Bond (costumes), Helena Kuukka (lights), Mike Savenelli (sound).

=== San Francisco ===
Tomorrowland had its West Coast premiere with Signal Theatre Company at 450 Geary Studio Theatre in San Francisco, California. Directed by Reid Davis, the cast featured Eowyn Mader, Jack Davis, Janna Sobel, Samuel Gates, Carolyn Doyle, Michael Carrol, and Lorraine Olsen. The creative team included Reid Davis (sets) and Max Davidson (costumes).

== Reception ==
Tomorrowland received positive reviews from theater critics across its various productions.

Peter Marks of The New York Times noted "Ms. Beber's full-length play, Tomorrowland about the trials of writing for a children's television show, had an excellent production Off-Broadway." Charlie Whitehead of Time Out was equally enthusiastic, writing "With Maria Mileaf’s snappy direction, each scene reveals a wild alternate reality... If you are not already terrified by the prospect of the Disneyfication of America, this wry exploration of its possible effects will put the fear of Mickey in you."

Bob Mondello of Washington City Paper observed "Tomorrowland is a briskly hilarious comedy about a brittle New Yorker who abandons her doctoral dissertation on Virginia Woolf's use of parenthesis to write scripts for kid's TV show." Nelson Pressley of The Washington Post noted "Beber deftly turns show-biz absurdities into effective comedy, and the piece is meticulously constructed, with literary devices and motifs lining up in a way that makes sense for a tale about a high-minded writer at sea. The play's weak suit is storytelling suspense: By the time "Tomorrowland" comes to an end, we've known where we were going for a very long time."

Robert Hurwitt of the San Francisco Chronicle offered more mixed sentiments, noting "Orlando is the theme-park capital of Florida and Orlando is a novel by Virginia Woolf. Place the two Orlandos like brackets around a children's TV show, and you've got some sense of the oddball originality, curiously skewed ambition and ultimately unrealized potential of Neena Beber's Tomorrowland… It's a tough script to bring to life, and the young Signal company (best-known for its popular Shylock on Valencia Street last year) isn't quite up to the task."
