= Why We Have a Body =

Theatrical play

- A poster for the re-release of Why We Have a Body at Magic Theatre
- Original language: English
- Written by: Claire Chafee
- Characters: Lili; Renee; Mary; Eleanor
- Genre: Comedy

Premiere
- Date: 1993

Why We Have a Body is the first play by Claire Chafee. It premiered in 1993 at the Magic Theatre in San Francisco, California, and was labeled a "lesbian play". It was then produced for Off-Broadway theatre and was staged in Canada and Australia. In 2011 it was revived at the Magic Theatre. Chafee received the George Oppenheimer Award for Best Emerging Playwright from Newsday.

== Plot summary ==
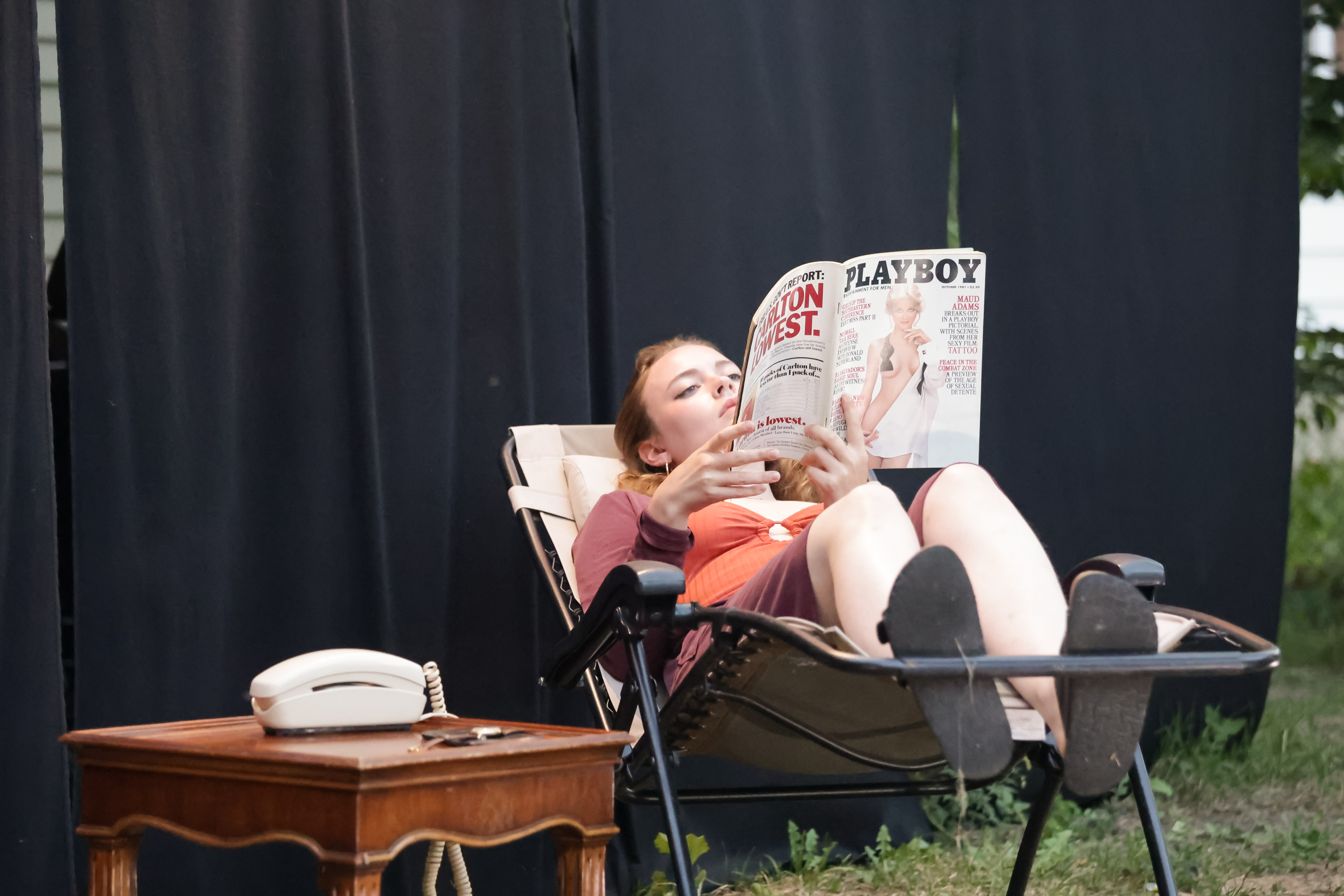
Scene from a performance during the 2021 Minnesota Fringe Festival

There are only four characters in the play. Lili, a private detective, is attracted to Renee, a straight paleontologist who is having trouble with her marriage. Lili's sister, Mary, has schizophrenia and as a result, she robs 7-Eleven stores. Mary lives with Lili briefly, until their mother, Eleanor, returns from Central America, and Lili starts an affair with Renee. While this is happening, Mary is arrested for robbery. There is a focus on how their mother's constant traveling has affected the lives of the two sisters.

== Background ==
Why We Have a Body was the first play written by Chafee. When it premiered in 1993 at the Magic Theatre in San Francisco, it was labeled as a lesbian play. An inspiration for the play was Harriet the Spy, a children's novel published in 1964, whose main character Chafee thought of as "the first lesbian I met".

Almost all auditions for the original play were recorded on video. After its first six months, the play was produced for Off-Broadway theatre by the Women's Project Theater and was also staged in Canada and Australia. Chafee has said that she believes people responded strongly to her play because of the tension as the plot goes back and forth between comedy and deep questions.

The play was later shown in 1994 by the Judith Anderson Theatre, 1995 by Tiffany Theater, and in 1997 by The Theatre Conspiracy. It was revived at the Magic Theatre in 2011 through 2012.

== Reception ==
Stephen Holden of The New York Times wrote of the 1994 production, "If Why We Have a Body doesn't offer much in the way of a plot and ends abruptly, that's because it is far more interested in metaphorical speculation about identity – genetic, sexual and mythical – than in telling a story."

In a review of the 1997 production, Lloyd Rose of The Washington Post wrote, "This is the sort of play that can become opaque, coy and annoying very quickly, but playwright Claire Chafee has a gift for language and a sense of humor, and Heather May's direction is cool and clear as spring water."

Christopher Meeks wrote in a review of the 1995 production for Variety, "Why We Have a Body is a rich, dense and sometimes confusing and fragmented piece of material that will reward those with patience."

== Awards ==
Chafee received the George Oppenheimer Award for Best Emerging Playwright from Newsday for her debut. The play also garnered the San Francisco Drama-Logue Award, the Bay Area Critics' Choice Award, and the Princess Grace Special Projects Grant.
