= Saviana Stănescu =

American playwright and poet

- Born: 1967 (age 58–59); Bucharest, Romania
- Citizenship: Romania; United States
- Education: New York University Tisch School of the Arts (BA, MFA); National University for Theatre and Film, Bucharest (PhD)
- Occupations: Playwright, poet, professor
- Employer: Ithaca College
- Awards: Fulbright scholar, New York Innovative Theatre Award for Outstanding Script, UNITER Award, NYSCA Fellowship, New York Theatre Person of the Year, Indie Theater Hall of Fame

Saviana Stănescu (born 1967) is a Romanian-American award-winning playwright, ARTivist, and poet based in Ithaca, New York.

Hailed as one of the most exciting voices to have emerged in Eastern Europe after the fall of the Iron Curtain, Stănescu has received numerous accolades for her work, including the New York Innovative Theatre Award for Outstanding Script (Waxing West) and the Best Romanian Play of the Year UNITER Award (Inflatable Apocalypse). She has been inducted into the Indie Theater Hall of Fame and was named the Indie Theater Person of the Year in 2010. Richard Schechner wrote on the cover of Stănescu's poetry book Diary of a Clone: "Saviana Stănescu is for and of the 21st century. She is hot and cool, witty and brave, sexy and weird, politically knowing and cynical. But most of all, she is an extraordinary writer."

After protesting in the streets as a student at the Romanian Revolution in 1989, Stănescu worked in the newly created Free Press as a cultural journalist at the daily newspaper Adevarul, a contributor to Radio Free Europe, and a talk-show host for TVR International (Necessary Polemics). Her revolutionary spirit inspires all her theatrical and literary work.

Stănescu's cutting-edge plays have been developed/produced at Women's Project, La MaMa, 59E59, New York Theatre Workshop, Ensemble Studio Theater, HERE, New Georges, Lark, Cherry, Civic Ensemble, Teatro La Capilla, and Teatrul Odeon, just to name a few. She has also served as the NYSCA playwright-in-residence for Women's Project, writer-in-residence of East Coast Artists, and Director of International Exchange for The Lark Play Development Center (TCG New Generations / New Leaders Fellow) in New York. Her US plays include Aliens with Extraordinary Skills, Ants, White Embers (all published by Samuel French), Useless, Toys, For a Barbarian Woman, Lenin's Shoe, Waxing West, What Happens Next, Bee Trapped Inside a Window, and Zebra 2.0.

As a Fulbright fellow, she studied at NYU Tisch, receiving her MA in Performance Studies and an MFA in Dramatic Writing. Her PhD is in Theatre from the National University for Theatre and Film (UNATC) in Bucharest, Romania. Stănescu is also a celebrated professor and has taught Playwriting and Contemporary Theatre/Drama at NYU Tisch (2004-2012), Strasberg Institute for Theatre&Film, ESPa Primary Stages, and Fordham University. Currently, she works as a tenured Associate Professor of Theatre Arts at Ithaca College.

== Early life ==
Born in Bucharest and raised in Curtea de Argeș, first capital of Walachia, and Pitești, an industrial town, in Romania, Saviana Stănescu spent her formative years under Nicolae Ceaușescu's dictatorship. She recalls in an interview having "rations of food and electricity, four hours of hot water per week, and two hours of TV programming per day, most of it filled with Ceaușescu's speeches."

Saviana's grandparents were ethnic Aromanian. Her mother, Mariana Stănescu (née Dima) is Aromanian and her father, Cornel Stănescu, track and field athlete and coach, is probably of Romani descent.

She was married to Alexandru Condeescu, director of the National Museum of Literature, Bucharest and father of Ada Condeescu, a Romanian actress, and Filip Condeescu.

== Career ==
Before immigrating to the United States, Stănescu made a name for herself in Romania as a poet and playwright: she published three books of poetry, Love on Barbed Wire (1994), Advice for Housewives and Muses (1996), and The Outcast (1997). Her dramatic poem Proscrisa/Outcast was produced in Paris at the Theatre Gérard Philipe and at Teatrul Dramatic Galați in 1998. Her first plays Infanta, User's Guide (Infanta, Mod de Intrebuințare) and Final Countdown (Numărătoarea Inversă) were produced in Romania between 1998–2001, announcing a cutting-edge playwright to watch.

Stănescu studied playwriting in English with David Harrower and Phyllis Nagy, at the Summer International Theatre Academy in Germany. Upon returning to Romania, she won the UNITER (Romanian Theatre Guild) Best Play of the Year Award for The Inflatable Apocalypse (Apocalipsa Gonflabilă). She recalls the moment as having "officially made [her] a playwright." The Inflatable Apocalypse was published in 2000.

Among Stănescu's many other notable publications is Black Milk, a Romanian-English collection of four plays and her first book of poetry in English – published in both Bucharest and New York – Google Me!

== Plays ==
Stănescu has written:

- Aliens with Extraordinary Skills – Commissioned and produced by Women's Project, starring Jessica Pimentel (Orange is the New Black), New York; Teatro La Capilla, Mexico City; Teatrul Odeon, Bucharest, etc. A dark comedy about a clown from the "unhappiest country in the world," Moldova, who pins her hopes on a US work visa. Chased by Homeland Security, a deportation letter deflates her enthusiasm and a pair of spike heels might be all it takes to burst her American Dream. Based on true stories of immigration explored and fictionalized by a playwright trying to understand her own story. Mexican version: Immigrantes con Abilidades Extraordinaries. Romanian version as performed at Odeon: Viza de Clown.
- Ants – Produced by New Jersey Repertory Company; developed with The New Group. Two immigrant sisters struggle to make ends meet as they attempt to capture a piece of the American dream.
- Aurolac Blues – Produced at HERE Arts Center, New York, etc. Two Roma ("Gypsy") street-kids, high on Aurolac (a silver-paint that's huffed from plastic bags), dream of an America they know from movies and McDonalds leftovers.
- Bee Trapped Inside a Window – Commissioned and produced by Civic Ensemble. Explores modern-day slavery's effect on the lives of three women of different backgrounds and ethnicities in the leafy suburbs of Connecticut.
- For a Barbarian Woman – Commissioned and developed by Long Wharf Theatre, Connecticut; produced by Ensemble Studio Theatre & Fordham University. This play interweaves a present-day love story between a Romanian interpreter and an American colonel from the NATO base in Constanța (a seaside resort in Romania, formerly the ancient city of Tomis, where Roman poet Ovid spent his exile)and a fictional relationship between Ovid and a Barbarian woman. Black Sea and their muses have witnessed and tell both stories.
- Gun Hill – Developed at WP Theater, New York; Kitchen Theatre, Ithaca. A black English teacher riskily attempts to convince her troubled white student to abandon the idea of a shooting spree at their high school. Will she succeed?
- Hurt – Published in Best Short American Plays 2012-2013 by Applauses; produced by Manhattan Theatre Festival; FLEFF/Cinemapolis, Ithaca, New York. A man is ready to go on a shooting spree. Are the two women in his life going to stop him?
- Lenin's Shoe – Produced (barebones) by The Lark; NYU MFA in Dramatic Writing thesis. The wheelchair-using son of a Russian mafioso plans to kill his father – now owner of a restaurant in Queens. He comments on reality by immersing himself into a world of blogs, the only place he can be himself. An intimate look into the world of East European immigrants living in New York after the fall of the Iron Curtain and their struggle to redefine the word ‘home.’
- The Others – Conceived/directed by Saviana and developed with Ithaca College students. The Others is a piece about micro-aggressions on student campuses. 2016 production starred then-IC student, Jharrel Jerome (Moonlight, This is Us)
- Waxing West (A Hairy-Tale in Four Seasons) – Winner of New York Innovative Theatre Award for Outstanding Full-length Script; produced by East Coast Artists at La MaMa theatre in New York. A Romanian cosmetologist arrives in the United States as the soon-to-be bride to a sexually repressed computer engineer. As she adjusts to her new life with him in the land of dreams, Elena and Nicolae Ceaușescu, former Dictator-and-Wife of Romania, but now vampires, haunt her days and nights. This comic yet socially and politically relevant drama journeys between Romania and New York, between past and present, and the American Dream and American nightmare.
- What Happens Next – Commissioned and produced by The Cherry Artspace. Two women in a white room are prisoners of routine and imagination. But are they both human? Maybe one is a robot, or clone, or hologram, or ghost....”Black Mirror” meets Waiting for Godot in this futuristic drama.
- White Embers – Samuel French OOB Winner; produced at Theatre Row, New York; Hudson Theatre, Los Angeles; Dramalabbet, Stockholm, etc. A woman from the East confronts a woman from the West. A US couple goes to Bechnya (a fictional country torn by wars) to adopt a child. The past and the present collide and intersect in unexpected ways.
- Unicorn Girl – Commissioned and produced by the Hangar Theatre, Ithaca, New York. When an 8-year-old gets bullied at school for having two dads, she sets out on a fantastical journey to end bullying and encourage listening. Her stuffed unicorn, Connie, joins her on this journey of discovery, during which she meets people-like animals, animal-like people, and the President.
- Useless – Produced by IRT, New York. A dark humored drama about love, dreams and human trafficking. It investigates the relationship between a couple of Eastern European immigrants involved in kidney trafficking. The play intersperses heightened realistic scenes with dreams and nightmares that offer a glimpse into the characters’ inner lives and alternate realities.
- Zebra 2.0 – Commissioned by Transforma Inc. for the Science in Theatre Festival in Manhattan. An undocumented woman, working as a night-shift janitor at a Wildlife preservation/tracking company in the US, develops an uncanny friendship with the main Artificial Intelligence.

== Poetry ==
- Diary of a Clone
- The Fall
- Polanski Polanski
- "Google Me!" - poetry in English
- Black Milk - An English-Romanian anthology of 4 plays
- The Outcast - A dramatic poem
- Advice for Housewives and Muses - Poetry and prose
- Love on the Barbed Wire - A book of poems

== Honors ==
- 2007 New York Innovative Theatre Award for Outstanding Full-Length Script
- 2004 John Golden Award for Excellence in Playwriting
- 2002 Antoine Vitez Center award for "Final Countdown" (published in French), Paris
- 2001-2002 Fulbright scholar – Tisch School of the Arts, Performance Studies
- 2001 writer-in-residence of KulturKontakt in Vienna, Austria
- 2000 Fellow of the British Council Cambridge Seminar, University of Cambridge
- 2000 Representative of Romania at International Poetry Festival Struga, Macedonia
- 2000 – Best Play of the Year Uniter National Award
- 1999 – 'Poesis' Award for Theatre-Poem
- 1998 – Bucharest Writers Association Poetry Award Nomination
- 1992 – 'Lucian Blaga' Festival Poetry Award
