= Stephanie Ybarra =

American theatre artist and activist

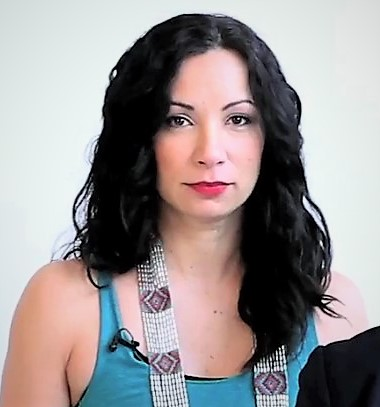
- Ybarra in the "Make It Fair" video in 2015
- Born: San Antonio, Texas
- Education: Baylor University (BFA); Yale University (MFA)
- Awards: Producers Chair Award – Foundry Theatre (2006); The Josephine Abady Award – League of Professional Theatre Women (2012); TCG's Continuing Education Grant (2015); Congressional Award for Achievement in Excellence - Zara Aina (2016); The Baltimore Sun's 25 Women to Watch (2018)

Stephanie Ybarra is the former artistic director of Baltimore Center Stage. and a co-founder of the Artists' Anti-Racism Coalition, a grassroots effort to help the Off-Broadway community dismantle systems of exclusion and oppression. Originally from San Antonio, Texas, Ybarra holds an undergraduate degree from Baylor University and an MFA from the Yale School of Drama. She has worked in theaters of all sizes across the United States.

== Early life and education ==
Ybarra grew up in San Antonio Texas, and identifies as multi-ethnic. She completed her Bachelor of Fine Arts at Baylor University in Waco, Texas, in 1999. While at Baylor, she was a member of Zeta Tau Alpha sorority and was a part of the Theatre Student Society. Ybarra received an MFA in Theatre Management from Yale University. In her final year at Yale she also worked at Yale Repertory Theatre as the Associate Managing Director of YSD and New Play Development.

== Career ==
=== Early career ===
After college Ybarra worked at the Dallas Children's Theatre for four years. She then moved to Boston and served as the deputy director of program operations for Citizen Schools, an educational non-profit serving low-income and underserved communities. After two years at Citizen Schools, Ybarra began her master's degree at Yale.

After attending Yale for her MFA, Ybarra made her New York producing debut in 2007 with The Brothers Size by Tarrell McCraney at The Public Theater's Under the Radar Festival. She went to work as the interim general manager at Two River Theatre Company in New Jersey before joining The Playwrights Realm, a nonprofit off-Broadway theater dedicated to supporting early-career playwrights. As Producing Director at The Playwrights Realm, Ybarra produced many early-career playwrights including Anna Ziegler, Jen Silverman, and Gonzalo Rodriguez Risco.

Some of Ybarra's other producing credits include: "Mentor Project" at Cherry Lane Theater, Finding Ways by Snehal Desai at HERE Arts Center, We Play for the Gods, by the 2010–2012 Lab at Women's Project Theatre, One Night With Rael, by Timothy Charles Brown at Ars Nova's A.N.T. Fest, Billy Witch by Greg Moss at Studio 42, "The HPRL Writers Group" at INTAR.

=== Public Theater ===
Stephanie Ybarra was the Director of Special Artistic Projects at the Public, where she began as an Artistic Associate in 2012. In that position, Ybarra led the Mobile Unit and Public Forum Programs. The Mobile Unit is the branch of the Public Theater that, based on the notion that "culture belongs to all," performs free Shakespeare plays across the five boroughs in prisons, homeless shelters, and community centers.

=== Baltimore Center Stage ===
In 2018, Stephanie Ybarra was appointed as the artistic director of Baltimore Center Stage, in Baltimore, MD. She is the first Latinx theater artist to be named the artistic director of a LORT Theatre.

In 2020 she announced Center Stage's plan to address systemic issues in the theater industry with a series of commitments including adopting a limited rehearsal schedule (five days a week instead of six), prohibit very long rehearsal days, pay playwrights for time spent in rehearsal, and equalize pay between their small and large spaces.

In response to the pandemic, Ybarra helped organize a group of theaters to create, Play at Home, plays written to be performed by people at home. When it became clear that in person theater was cancelled she said, "it seemed important to not just share our content virtually, but to engage people in the act of making theater and participating in the art form in a different way”.

=== Teaching ===
Stephanie Ybarra also teaches, the class she teaches at Juilliard is called Elements of Producing.

== Producing style ==
Ybarra is a self-described "creative producer." She seeks to find a delicate balance of creativity and business acumen, explaining that, in her opinion, producers ought to have a place in the room where creative processes and decisions are occurring. Ybarra views vulnerability as important to her work and says that her artistic superpower is "being able to speak fluently in both the artistic and business vocabularies, and using the art and the commerce to make both thrive." Those who have worked with Ybarra describe her as a collaborator who brings a sense of humor to the theatrical process.

At the Public, Ybarra focused her energies on "radical inclusivity". In 2017, with the Public's Mobile Unit, she brought a Cuban-inspired version of Shakespeare's Twelfth Night to venues including New York City's Lesbian, Gay, Bisexual & Transgender Community Center and Rikers Island Correction Facility. In her work with the Mobile Unit, Ybarra worked under the philosophy of "be[ing] humans together" which she used to guide actors as they made art in spaces, including correctional facilities, which are actively working to oppress people.

About the difficulty of producing during the pandemic The New York Times said "she has tried to fashion a season both ambitious and pragmatic. “It’s not like we took a leap without a net,” she said. “Our contingency plans have contingency plans.”" Ybarra wants to encourage work that taps into our collective imagination.

== Awards and recognition ==
- Producers Chair Award – Foundry Theatre (2006)
- The Josephine Abady Award – League of Professional Theatre Women (2012)
- TCG's Continuing Education Grant (2015)
- Congressional Award for Achievement in Excellence - Zara Aina (2016)
- The Baltimore Sun's 25 Women to Watch
- Nation Builder Award - National Black Caucus of State Legislators (2018)
- YBCA 100 - Yerba Buena Center for the Arts (2019)
