= Oppenheimer Award =

The Oppenheimer Award (also known as the Newsday George Oppenheimer Award or the Oppy) was named after the late playwright and Newsday drama critic George Oppenheimer.

== History ==
It was awarded annually to the best New York debut production by an American playwright for a non-musical play. The selection committee has included playwrights Edward Albee, Wendy Wasserstein, James Lapine, and Richard Greenberg. The award carries a $5,000 cash prize. The first award of $1,000, to the play Getting Out by Marsha Norman, was made in 1979, two years after Oppenheimer's death. It was discontinued in 2007.

== Winners ==
- 1979 Getting Out, Marsha Norman
- 1981 Crimes of the Heart, Beth Henley
- 1983 To Gillian on Her 37th Birthday, Michael Brady
- 1985 The Bloodletters by Richard Greenberg
- 1988 Mr. Universe by Jim Grimsley
- 1989 The Film Society Jon Robin Baitz
- 1990 Tales of the Lost Formicans, Constance Congdon
- 1991 La Bête by David Hirson
- 1992 Marvin's Room, Scott McPherson
- 1993 Joined at the Head by Catherine Butterfield
- 1994 Pterodactyls by Nicky Silver. Why We Have a Body by Claire Chafee
- 1996 Insurrection: Holding History, Robert O'Hara
- 1997 The Grey Zone, Tim Blake Nelson
- 1999 Wit by Margaret Edson
- 2002 Brutal Imagination by Cornelius Eady
- 2003 Corner Wars by Tim Dowlin
- 2004 The Flu Season by Will Eno
- 2005 Everything Will Be Different: A Brief History of Helen of Troy, Mark Schultz
- 2006 The Sugar Bean Sisters, Nathan Sanders
- 2007 Heddatron, Elizabeth Meriwether
