= Neena Beber =

American playwright and producer

Neena Beber is an American playwright, librettist, screenwriter, and television producer.

== Early life and education ==
Beber was born and raised in Miami, Florida.

Beber has a bachelor's degree from Harvard and a Master of Fine Arts from New York University's Tisch School of the Arts.

== Career ==
Beber started out writing for television, including on Clarissa Explains It All, and switched to writing for the theater. She also has produced for television, including on The Marvelous Mrs. Maisel.

=== Theater productions ===
Her comedy Hard Feelings was performed at the Women's Project Theater in 2000. Her play Jump/Cut was performed in 2006 at the Julia Miles Theater in New York. She wrote the book for the musical Rutka, which premiered at Cincinnati's Playhouse in the Park in October 2024.

=== Publication ===
Her short (10-minute) play Misreadings was included in Best American Short Plays, 1996–7. As of 2016 nearly a dozen of her plays had been included in compilations, in addition to those published separately.

=== Teaching ===
Beber has taught for the MFA playwriting program at Columbia University.

== Recognition ==
She was nominated for an Emmy Award in 1994 for Outstanding Children's Program for Clarissa Explains it All and in 2023 for Outstanding Comedy Series for The Marvelous Mrs. Maisel. In 2006 she won an Obie Emerging Playwright Grant for Jump/Cut. In 2010 she received a Lark Play Development Center fellowship. She won the Go Write a Play award, which supports a new play by a female playwright, at the 2014 Lilly Awards.

== Selected works ==
- Rutka (musical) (book)
- The Marvelous Mrs. Maisel (co-executive producer)
- Strangers (executive producer)
- A Common Vision. New York: Samuel French, 2009. ISBN 9780573696619
- Tomorrowland. New York: Samuel French, 2009. ISBN 9780573696633
- The Dew Point. New York: Samuel French, 2009. ISBN 9780573696626
- Jump/Cut. New York, N.Y: Samuel French, 2007. ISBN 9780573628764
- Hard Feelings (playwright)
- Clarissa Explains It All (writer, producer)
