= Monet Hurst-Mendoza =

American playwright

- Born: Monet Hurst-Mendoza
- Education: Marymount Manhattan College
- Occupations: Playwright; Theatre Producer
- Writing career
- Language: English; Spanish
- Years active: 2010–present
- Website: risingcircle.org

Monet Hurst-Mendoza is an American playwright, director, and theatre producer and television writer. Her plays predominantly feature people of color, and often deal with heavier subject matters—such as morality, exploitation, and corruption. She explores themes of race, culture, and identity in her works, and constructs characters that develop unconventional relationships and overcome situations via unique escapist approaches.

Hurst-Mendoza has worked with organizations such as Rising Circle Theater Collective, The Public Theater, WP Theater, |the claque|, Lookingglass Theatre Company, The Kupferberg Center, and The Classical Theatre of Harlem to develop her plays.

Hurst-Mendoza dedicates her career to promoting and advocating for greater representation of artists of color and women in theater. In April 2017, she spoke on the Challenging Stigma Through the Arts and Technology panel as part of the Nasty Women Unite Fest. She was part of the writing staff for Law and Order SVU for seasons 21–24.

== Education ==
Hurst-Mendoza attended Marymount Manhattan College from 2005 to 2009 and graduated with a B.A. in Theatre Arts, with concentrations in playwriting and directing. During her time there, she received the 2009 Gold Key for Excellence in Theatre Arts (Writing for the Stage).

From ages eight to eighteen, Hurst-Mendoza's background consisted mostly of acting and musical theater training. At the beginning of her career at Marymount Manhattan College, she was waitlisted for the musical theater program, and thus decided to enroll in the playwriting program instead. She cites the exact moment that she decided she did not want to act anymore as when she was waiting to attend her introduction to acting class, in which she was studying Spike Heels by Theresa Rebeck. While observing the other actors in the class perform a scene, Hurst-Mendoza recalls herself reconfiguring in her mind how the acting teacher had chosen to stage the play. It was then when she realized that she did not have as much of an interest in acting as she did in figuring out "how these people are getting to where they are getting and how it looks."

== Career ==
=== WP Theater ===
WP Theater (formerly known as Women's Project Theater) is the oldest and largest theater company in the United States that focuses on developing, promoting, and producing the works of female-identifying theatre artists throughout their careers. The company has been an avid advocate of gender equality since its establishment in 1978 by producer Julia Miles. Miles was motivated by a desire to address and alleviate the severe under-representation of women in theatre. WP Theater has since cultivated a large, thriving community of female playwrights, directors, and producers in theatre and beyond.

From 2014 to 2016, Hurst-Mendoza was a Lab Member at the WP Theater. This is a two-year residency for female-identifying playwrights, directors, and producers. During her residency, she served primarily as a playwright.

=== The Public Theater ===
In December 2015, Hurst-Mendoza was selected to be a member of the 2017 Emerging Writers Group at the Public Theater.

=== Rising Circle Theatre Collective ===
Based in New York City, Rising Circle Theater Collective is a theater collective that works exclusively to expand the range of narratives portrayed on the American stage by prioritizing the stories of people of color. They run four active programs, including INKtank, PlayRISE, The Refinery, and Spectrum Series, each of which provide artists of color and members of the theater community opportunities to create and develop their work as well as foster strong collaborations and networks. INKtank is an intensive twelve-week play development lab geared towards playwrights of color, through which Rising Circle provides structure and resources for playwrights to generate and develop fresh work every week. The program is a largely collaborative process and focuses on providing playwrights of color with a solid support system. PlayRISE is an annual reading series for the INKtank writers. It is an annual opportunity for the current year's INKtank writers to work with professional actors and directors to showcase staged readings of their new plays.

Hurst-Mendoza plays, Veil’d: A Fairytale and Lilia, have each been staged twice through Rising Circle's PlayRISE and The Refinery programs.

Since September 2011, Hurst-Mendoza has served as a Collective Member, and INKtank/PlayRISE Producer. She and Raquel Almazan are current co-facilitators of INKtank.

=== New Dramatists ===
In 2016, Hurst-Mendoza was selected for the 2016–2018 round of the Van Lier Playwriting Fellowship Program. The program is based in New York City, and lasts for a period of two-years. It aims to aid young, economically disadvantaged playwrights of color to hone and develop their skills and become bigger names in the professional theater community.

== Themes and influences ==
When asked about the type of theatre that she finds exciting, Hurst-Mendoza responded, "variety excites me. I like seeing atypical stories told from various perspectives." Much of her work today reflects this line of thinking, as her plays involve a variety of genres and themes. These subject-matters include sexual violence, religion, identity politics, mass incarceration, sexism, and racism. Hurst-Mendoza attempts to engage with and confront such themes in her work that have become increasingly relevant in the socio-political discourse of 21st-century United States. She has described the aesthetic of her plays and stage directions as being very visual, as she often has very specific visions of what pictures should be created in her mind. One of her favorite ways of positioning her actors are either on the floor or sitting down, or back-to-back.

Hurst-Mendoza has expressed an admiration for many members of and contributors to the theatre community, including Migdalia Cruz, Katori Hall, Lynn Nottage, JoAnne Akalaitis, Deborah Warner, Naomi Iizuka, Anne Bogart, Nilo Cruz, Jules Feiffer, Jean-Paul Sartre, and Paula Vogel.

== Plays ==
- Lilia
  - Cast: 5
  - Genre: faith-based, period
  - Keyword: Mexico, Catholicism, Temptation, religion, Small Towns, people of color, romance, sexual violence, sexual identity, prostitution

"In a small Yucatecan town circa 1960's Mexico, religiously devout Lilia is forced to turn to prostitution as a means of making a living. When young Lilia develops an unconventional friendship with a compassionate new priest in town, everyone's faith is tested. Caught between the secrets and lies that force us to question the morality of human nature, LILIA presents a passionate allegory about choosing between duty and desire."

- Jane's Room

Mendoza's first play to be produced in New York City

"An adaptation of Charlotte Perkins Gilman's The Yellow Wallpaper. Possibly a period piece, possibly a ghost story, possibly an abstract discussion on women being trapped."

- Veil’d: A Fairytale
  - Cast: 5–7
  - Genre: adaptation, adventure, comedy, fable/folktale, fantasy, romantic comedy, young audiences
  - Keyword: magical realism, fairy-tale, Rapunzel, burqas, sharks, Family Drama, Afghan-American, immigrant experience, parenting a special needs child

"Not every fairy tale has sunshine. Dima is a 16-year old outcast with a rare skin allergy who hides behind her mother's old burqa. Her best friend is a talking nurse shark named Speedo that she keeps hidden in her room. Strained between their daughter’s obsessive attachment to her burqa and her inability to step outside, Dima's parents fear that she will never experience the world around her. That is, until she begins a secret friendship with her "Prince Charming"--a streetwise, hipster poet-boy named Elliot, who throws poems through her window. Together (and with a little encouragement from Speedo), Dima and Elliot embark on a magical journey of first love, culminating in an unforgettable trip to the Atlantic Ocean. Rapunzel never had it this bad. Or this good."

- Blind Crest
  - Cast: 4–6
  - Genre: docudrama/historic, drama, political
  - Keyword: black lives matter, prison, gender politics, Gritty, Race, United States, Mass Incarceration, Female-Driven

"Tyrell Johnson sits on Death Row for the double-murder of two undercover detectives. Mara Hernandez is a fresh-faced corrections officer, newly appointed to the night watch. Together, this unlikely pair, form an intense bond and make a pact to have a baby. A dark twist on the “boy-meets-girl” and inspired by the unfolding true story of Ronnell Wilson and Nancy Gonzalez, Blind Crest investigates our corrupt and inherently racist judicial system, compelling us to ask, "what is the value of a Black life in America, and at what cost are we willing to fight for it?"

== Honors and awards ==
- 2009 Gold Key for Excellence in Theatre Arts (Writing for the Stage).
