= Christina Gorman =

American playwright

Christina Gorman is an American playwright, whose work has been produced around the country.

== Early life ==
Christina Gorman grew up in Colt's Neck, New Jersey. While she loved theatre from a young age, she did not begin actively creating theatre until college, when she began stage managing. After college she interned for a year at Juilliard as a stage manager and did professional stage management work. She then began working in advertising, but realized she missed theatre and began to write.

== Career ==
Gorman has had her plays developed at a number of major theatres and play development centers. Her play Fidelis was developed at the Public Theater in February 2015. In February 2017, Roan @ the Gates was developed and given workshop performances at the Alley Theatre as part of their Alley All New festival. Her work has also been developed and/or produced at Ensemble Studio Theatre, Geva Theatre Center, Westport County Playhouse, Lark Play Development Center, Stella Adler Studios, and the New York International Fringe Festival, among others.

From 2006 to 2008, Gorman was a member of the Women's Project Playwright Lab. She was then named an inaugural member of the Public Theater's Emerging Writers Group. She has also been a 2013 Playwright Fellow at the New York Foundation for the Arts, the 2010-2011 Harold Clurman Playwright-in-Residence at Stella Adler Studios, and an Ensemble Studio Theatre New Voices Fellow, through which she developed Split Wide Open. She is an Artistic Associate at American Blues Theater.

== Awards ==
Gorman has been the recipient of several awards throughout her career. She was won American Blues Theater's Blue Ink Playwriting Award in 2012 for her play American Myth, the Theatre Communications Group's 2013 Edgerton Foundation New American Play Award (also for American Myth), Samuel French's Short Play Festival Award in 2009 for Just Knots, and the New York International Fringe Festival Award for Overall Excellence in Playwriting. She was also a runner-up for the Princess Grace Award.

== Selected works ==
=== Full length plays ===
- Sacred Ground
- Far From the Trees
- American Myth
- Fidelis
- Roan @ the Gates

=== Short plays ===
- DNA
- The Grey Ladies
- The God Particle
- Just Knots
