= Mathilde Dratwa =

Belgian playwright and screenwriter

- Occupations: Playwright; screenwriter

Mathilde Dratwa is a Belgian playwright and screenwriter currently based in the United States. She is the co-founder of Moms in Film.

== Early life and education ==
Dratwa is originally from Belgium. She attended Cambridge University and Drama Centre London.

== Career ==
In 2016, Dratwa co-founded Moms in Film (MIF) with Christy Lamb. The organization advocates for mothers working in film and has led initiatives such as the Wee Wagon, a mobile childcare unit.

Dratwa's play, Milk and Gall was a finalist for the 503 International Playwriting Award in 2018. It premiered at Theatre503 in 2021, directed by Lisa Spirling. Her next play, Dirty Laundry, was commissioned through Audible's Emerging Playwright's Fund. It premiered at WP Theatre, presented with Spark Theatrical/Laurie Bernhard, and under the direction of Rebecca Martinez in September 2024. Dirty Laundry won the 2022-2023 Henley Rose Award and the 2024 Kernodle New Play Award. Her play, A Play About David Mamet Writing About Harvey Weinstein, premiered as a sold-out reading to benefit the New York Civil Liberties Union in 2025 at the off-Broadway theater, Playwrights Horizons. The play was inspired by Mamet's 2019 play, Bitter Wheat.

== Personal life ==
After finishing grad school, Dratwa moved to New York.

== Plays ==
- Esther Perel Ruined My Life
- Milk and Gall
- Dirty Laundry
- A Play About David Mamet Writing About Harvey Weinstein
