= Eureka Theatre Company =

Theatre company in San Francisco, California

- Interactive map of Eureka Theatre Company
- Former names: Eureka Theatre
- Address: 215 Jackson St, San Francisco, California; United States
- Coordinates: 37°47′47″N 122°24′00″W

Construction
- Opened: 1972
- Closed: July 5, 2017

Website
- https://42ndstmoon.org/gateway/

The Eureka Theatre Company was an American repertory theatre group located in San Francisco, California. It was founded in 1972 as the Shorter Players by Chris Silva, Robert Woodruff and Carl Lumbly. In 1974 its name was changed to the Eureka Theatre. In October 1981 the company was staging David Edgar's The Jail Diary of Albie Sachs when their space in the basement of the Trinity Methodist Church burned in an arson attack. By 1990 the company had moved to an industrial building at 2730 16th Street in the Mission.

The company is noted because in 1986 Oskar Eustis, then its dramaturg, and Tony Taccone, then its artistic director, commissioned a play from Tony Kushner. Eustis had seen Kushner's play A Bright Room Called Day in New York. The contract specified it should run no more than 2 hours, and include songs. With help from a $50,000 grant from the National Endowment for the Arts, it eventually turned into Angels in America, two three-and-a-half hour plays with no songs. In 1991 the company staged the world premiere of the first part, Millennium Approaches and staged readings of the second part, Perestroika, which was still being written.

The cost of staging Angels in America, about $250,000, ended the Eureka's career as a production company, although they continued to present plays, In 1998 the company took over the Gateway Theater in Jackson Square. Due to rising costs and the 2013 diversion of San Francisco's hotel tax fund away from the arts the company closed on 5 July 2017.

The Wayback Machine has a list of the company's productions up to 2001, and details of the 2009 to 2017 seasons.
