= D. J. R. Bruckner =

20th/21st-century American columnist, critic, and journalist

Donald Jerome Raphael Bruckner (November 26, 1933 – September 20, 2013) was an American columnist, critic, and journalist, whose work landed him on the master list of Nixon's political opponents.

Bruckner was born in Omaha, Nebraska. He studied at Creighton University, Nebraska, and at Indiana University where he held a Woodrow Wilson Fellowship, before being awarded a Rhodes Scholarship in 1955 to study at Merton College, Oxford. He took a first class degree in English in 1957.

Returning to the United States, Bruckner became an instructor at Lamar College in 1958; later that year, he went on active duty, serving with the US Army until 1960 in intelligence and research roles. (He had been commissioned into the US Army Reserve in 1955.)

After being discharged in 1960, Bruckner joined The Chicago Sun-Times as its labour editor. He later joined The Los Angeles Times as head of its Chicago bureau.

Bruckner was a book and theatre critic for The New York Times where he was on staff from 1981 to 2005. Bruckner died in Manhattan on September 20, 2013, aged 79.

== Selected publications ==
- Frederic Goudy (Masters of American Design)
- Art Against War: Four Hundred Years of Protest in Art
- Politics and Language: Spanish and English in the United States
- A Candid Talk with Saul Bellow
- The Campaign for Chicago: To Create an Inheritance Forever
