= Center Stage (theater) =

Non-profit organization in Baltimore, Maryland, US

Coordinates: 39°17′53″N 76°36′45″W

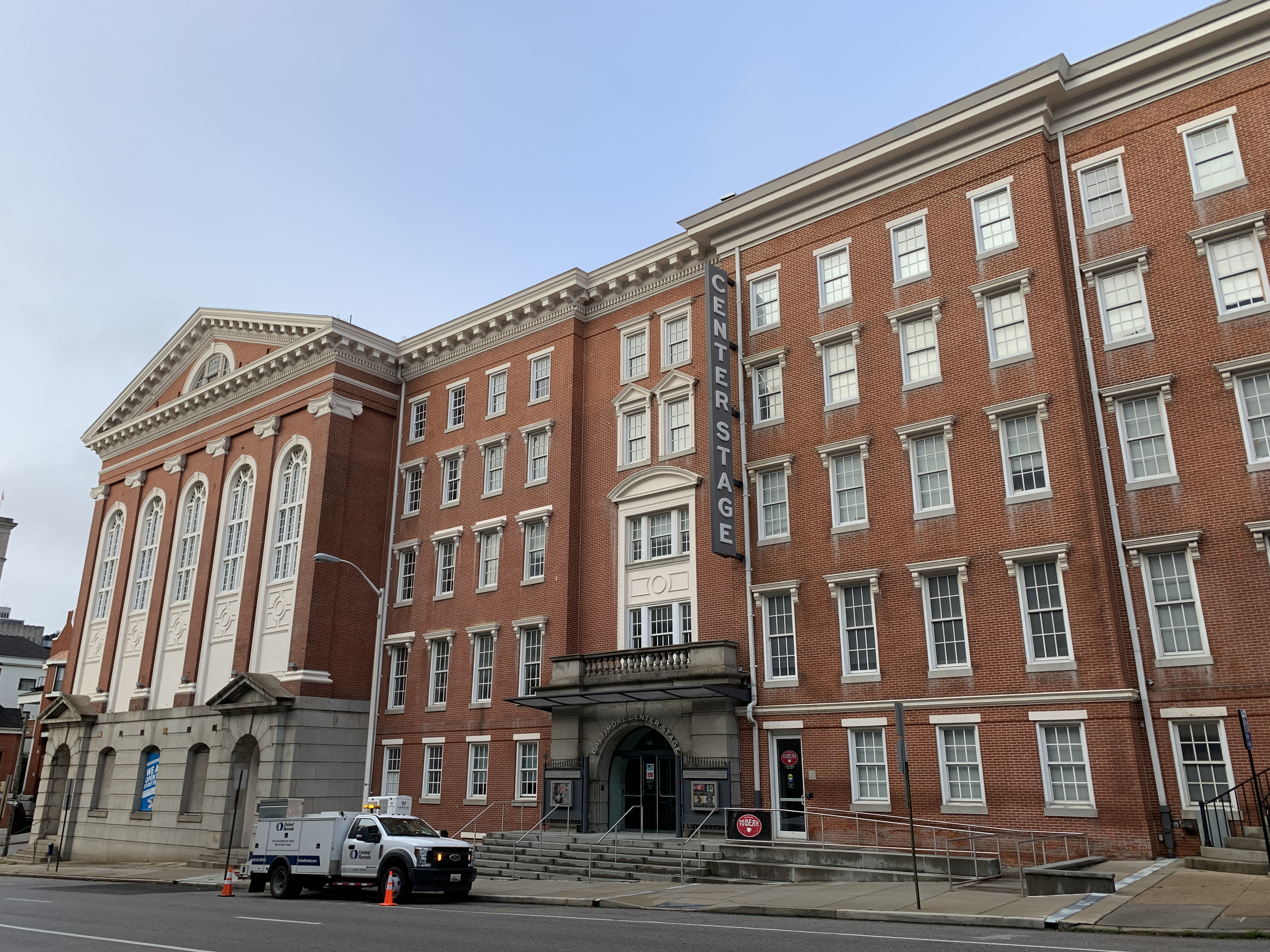
- Formation: 1963; 63 years ago
- Type: Theatre group
- Location: 700 N Calvert St, Baltimore, MD, U.S.
- Website: www.centerstage.org

Center Stage is the state theater of Maryland, and Baltimore's largest professional producing theater.

Center Stage began in a converted gymnasium in 1963 as a full arena theatre that seated 240 people. The Center Stage currently houses two performing spaces, the 541-seat Pearlstone and the smaller Head Theater, both in its home in the Mount Vernon Cultural District of Baltimore.

== History ==
Launched in 1963 by Marilyn Meyerhoff, Stamy Simopoulos and a group of local theater supporters, Center Stage soon became a leader in America's regional theater movement, with the goal of producing first-rate professional theater for local audiences, along with theaters such as The Guthrie Theater in Minneapolis, Arena Stage in Washington, DC, and Alley Theatre in Houston. In 1931 the North Avenue building was previously occupied by a theatre called The Peabody that opened in the early 1900s; in 1931 Orioles Cafeteria a local food chain restaurant moved into the space at 11 East North Avenue and moved out in August 1965 to make space for the Center Stage theater.

On January 10, 1974, the theater's North Avenue home was burned to the ground in an arson fire. After the 1974 fire, many decided that since the outer shell was not severely damaged, some hope remained for salvage use, but the interior was completely destroyed and unstable, was considered unsafe by city inspectors and construction crews and was later demolished. Although the majority of the building was demolished, both sides of the facade columns remain. Additional stage hands quickly rebuilt the set for Edward Albee's Who's Afraid of Virginia Woolf? for its performance the next night at the Baltimore Museum of Art and with help from local civic leaders the theater continued its season at the local College of Notre Dame and used the disaster to launch a major public relations and capital campaign to keep the organization alive.

The theater ultimately moved into a new space carved out of an abandoned Jesuit college. The Center Stage has since become Baltimore's leading professional theater, hosting more than 100,000 people each season to its home in Mount Vernon.

In 2011, British playwright Kwame Kwei-Armah succeeded Irene Lewis as artistic director of Center Stage. Previously, Center Stage had produced the American premiere of Kwei-Armah's most recognized work Elmina's Kitchen.

The 2018/19 Season welcomed Artistic Director Stephanie Ybarra, an artistic producer most recently at The Public Theater. Center Stage transitioned from a six-play to a seven-play season that included a mix of comedy, drama, and musicals. After the COVID-19 pandemic, the theater scaled back their season to include fewer shows. In 2024, the theater announced a 2024-2025 season consisting of six shows.

Main stage performances occur in either the 541-seat Pearlstone Theater or the smaller, flexible-layout Head Theater. The Play Lab series features new work from emerging and established artists. Third Spaces brings theater to unexpected stages, such as the 2013 production of The Container, which placed a small audience inside a shipping container, and Fourth Spaces explores the relationship between technology and artistry, using the Center Stage interactive media wall to connect audiences and theater artists.

== See also ==
- Theater in Maryland
