= Claire Chafee =

American playwright

Claire Chafee is an American playwright. Her 1993 play Why We Have a Body won an Oppenheimer Award.
