= Wendy C. Goldberg =

American theatre director

- Born: 1973 (age 52–53); Farmington Hills, Michigan, U.S.
- Education: University of Michigan; BA, Theatre & Comparative Literure (1995); UCLA School of Theater, Film & Television; MFA, Directing (1998)
- Occupation: Theatre director
- Known for: First female Artistic Director, Eugene O'Neill Theater Center's; National Playwrights Conference
- Notable work: Creative Advisor, Rock of Ages

Wendy C. Goldberg (born 1973) is an American theatre director and the current Artistic Director of the National Playwrights Conference at The Eugene O'Neill Theater Center. Under Goldberg's tenure, The O'Neill was awarded the 2010 Regional Theatre Tony Award, the first play development and education organization to receive this honor. Goldberg is the first woman to run the Playwrights Conference and was named Artistic Director when she was just 31 years old.

== Life and career ==
Goldberg was born in Michigan and her mother was a middle-school English teacher. She spent her youth training to be a professional tennis player, but her athletic career was cut short when she contracted lyme disease in 1989, the summer before her junior year in high school. Though Goldberg still managed to win the state championship that year, she decided to skip tennis camp the following summer, and went instead to an acting conservatory. The experience of the program changed her career focus, and when she went off to the University of Michigan after graduation, she chose to study theatre and comparative literature. After earning a BA, with honors, Goldberg continued her theatre education at the UCLA School of Theater, Film and Television where she completed an MFA in Directing in 1998.

After receiving her degree, Goldberg served for five seasons as Artistic Associate at Arena Stage in Washington, D. C., where her directing credits include The Goat, or Who is Sylvia?, Proof, Book of Days, and On the Jump. She led "Downstairs in the Old Vat Room," Arena's artistic initiative dedicated to the development of new American plays, since its inception. Other than the theater's founder, Zelda Fichandler, she is the youngest associate to have directed for the company in its 50-year history, making her main stage debut at the age of 26 with the company's revival of K2 in celebration of the company's 50th anniversary.

Goldberg has also directed in various new play development programs across the country, including work with New York Stage and Film, New Dramatists, The Women's Project, Arielle Tepper Productions, Hartford Stage, The Mark Taper Forum, Portland Center Stage, Woolly Mammoth Theatre Company, Ojai Playwrights Conference, the Oregon Shakespeare Festival and over 30 readings and workshops for Arena Stage.

At The O'Neill, Goldberg has developed more than forty projects for the stage and many have gone on to great acclaim in New York and around the country. Included in that group is the 2010 Susan Smith Blackburn Prize Winner (Julia Cho's The Language Archive), two American Theatre Critics Association Citation Award Winning Plays (Lee Blessing's Great Falls and Deborah Zoe Laufer's End Days) and 2009 Pulitzer Prize Winner for Drama (Lynn Nottage's Ruined), written in part during Lynn's residency at the O'Neill in the summer of 2006. In the 2007-2008 season, nine projects developed during Goldberg's tenure saw their world premieres at theaters across the country. Other critically acclaimed work developed at the O'Neill during Goldberg's tenure includes Adam Bock's The Receptionist, Rebecca Gilman's The Crown You're in With, Jason Grote's 1001 and Julia Cho's Durango.

Goldberg is also the Creative Advisor for the Tony nominated Rock of Ages on Broadway.

Her recent directing credits include Rebecca Gilman's Dollhouse (Guthrie Theater), The Crown You're in With (Goodman Theatre), the world premiere of Deathbed (McGinn/Cazale-NYC), Master Class (Paper Mill Playhouse), Durango (Cincinnati Playhouse in the Park), DOUBT (co-production with Cincinnati Playhouse in the Park and Actors Theater of Louisville), Third, The Sweetest Swing in Baseball, The Clean House, Living Out (Denver Center), the world premiere of False Creeds (Alliance Theater), The Chosen (Actors Theater of Louisville), and the world premiere of A Marriage Minuet (Florida Stage).

American Theatre Magazine hailed Wendy as "one of the country's most promising theater artists working today."

Goldberg sits on the Executive Board of the Stage Directors and Choreographers Society. She lives in Brooklyn, New York.
