= Chiori Miyagawa =

American dramatist

- Born: Nagano, Japan
- Education: Brooklyn College
- Occupations: Playwright, poet, dramaturg, and fiction writer
- Spouse: Hap Tivey
- Writing career
- Subjects: Exploring memory and finding identity
- Notable works: America Dreaming, Nothing Forever & Yesterday's Window, Firedance
- Notable awards: New York Foundation for the Arts Playwriting Fellowship, the Rockefeller Bellagio Residency Fellowship, and the Radcliffe Institute for Advanced Study Fellowship

Chiori Miyagawa is a Japanese-born American playwright, poet, dramaturg, and fiction writer based in New York City. She was born in Nagano, Japan before moving to the United States at an age of 16. She is currently playwright-in-residence at Bard College.

== Early life and career ==
Miyagawa moved to the United States with the intention to learn English for only one year but ended up staying permanently. When she first moved by herself to upstate New York as a teenager, Miyagawa said she had difficulty making friends at school and assimilating into American culture. She stated that at the beginning of her life in America, “For years to come, I would cut myself off from Japan. My language skills deteriorated...I had no contact with its culture.” Now, she describes her identity as a “hybrid of acquired American beliefs and imagined Japanese sentiments.” She became a U.S citizen in 1993.

Miyagawa earned her Masters of Fine Arts degree at Brooklyn College. Throughout her career, she has worked with numerous theaters. Miyagawa was a dramaturg for the Berkeley Repertory Theatre and a literary manager at the Arena Stage, Washington, D.C. She also was an Assistant literary manager at Actors Theatre of Louisville in Kentucky. Other notable places she has worked with include NYU Tisch School of the Arts graduate program, American Conservatory Theater, and the Young Playwrights Festival. At the New York Theatre Workshop, she was an artistic associate where she was the dramaturg for Joanna Akalaitis, 5-time Obie Award-winning theatre director. At The Public Theater, Miyagawa established and taught the Asian American Playwrights Lab. From 1998 to 2009, she was the founding co-artistic director of the Crossing Jamaica Avenue theatre company. She is a 2013 alumnus playwright of the New Dramatists.

She has received many fellowships including the New York Foundation for the Arts Playwriting Fellowship, the Rockefeller Bellagio Residency Fellowship, and the Radcliffe Institute for Advanced Study Fellowship at Harvard University. Her plays have been published by Seagull Books and NoPassport Press in two collections: Thousand Years Waiting and Other Plays and America Dreaming and Other Plays. She was a resident playwright at the New Dramatists and is a playwright-in-residence at Bard College. She lives in New York City and is married to Hap Tivey, an installation artist also on the Bard faculty.

== Recurring themes ==
Miyagawa's works are known for their themes of exploring memory and finding identity. She said once in an interview, “I believe everything we know about ourselves is entirely based on memory—history, science, art, religion are all constructs of human memory.” Her plays are often written in fluid time and space, rather than in a traditional linear timeline. Many of her works draw from Japanese literature and art forms for inspiration and also employ characters that are ghosts. Her works have explored a variety of issues, such as the interactions between Eastern and Western cultures, feminism, drug addiction, and the death penalty.

== Play productions ==
America Dreaming (1995) was the first play written by Chiori Miyagawa. It was produced by the Music-Theatre Group and Vineyard Theatre. The play follows the story of an Asian American woman, Yuki, who travels back in time, only to discover that history has been distorted so that certain events, such as the Vietnam War and the imprisonment of Japanese Americans in World War II, did not occur in the memory of Americans. It also is a love story that explores the dynamic between Eastern and Western cultures in the past and the present. America Dreaming received a Drama Desk Award Nomination in 1994. The New York Times described the play as, “an impressionistic music-theater piece exploring the collision of Eastern and Western cultures, that notion of happily-ever-after assimilation was always a myth.”

Nothing Forever & Yesterday’s Window (1996) were produced at the New York Theatre Workshop. Nothing Forever is a one-act play about an Asian American woman's memory. Yesterday’s Window is a play about a woman and her imaginary daughter. The two pieces are meant to be companions and can use the same actors.

Firedance (1997), produced by Voice & Vision Theater, is a love story between a waitress in NYC who meets a stranger who claims to be haunted by a shape-shifting ghost. Backstage praised Miyagawa's writing, “…the playwright takes the story far beyond such limitations of time and place…Given the playwright’s poetic language and imagery, the drama has reverberations which reach back into history and myth.”

Jamaica Avenue (1998) was produced by the New York International Fringe Festival. It is a story of drug addiction centered around a man, a ghost who comes back a woman, and a woman who becomes a ghost. The play was published in a book about the Asian American experience on New York City's stages.

Awakening (2000) was produced Performance Space 122 and was based on the 1899 novel The Awakening by Kate Chopin. The play is about the character Edna who is in an unsatisfactory marriage and also includes Kate Chopin as a character. Chiori Miyagawa stated that she was drawn to write an adaption of the novel because of the main character, “All my theatrical characters are outsiders in different ways, because I am one”.

Woman Killer (2001), inspired by the 1721 Japanese Bunraku puppet play from Monzemon Chikamatsu called The Woman Killer and The Hell of Oil. Set in Brooklyn in 2001, the story is about a man who kills a neighbor for money and how a family deals with the incident. ITN Review says, “Woman Killer is riveting, compelling theatre, and it raises questions that don't – won't – go away.”

Broken Morning (2003) was based on Chiori Miyagawa's interviews with Texas death row inmates. She interviewed not only inmates, but also the guards, family members, and victims surrounding the Huntsville State Prison. It premiered at the HERE Arts Center. Nytheater.com praised the work, “Broken Morning is compelling storytelling of the highest order; it will cause you to ask questions, to challenge your assumptions, and to reconsider what you thought you knew about fundamental social issues.”

Leaving Eden (2004) was inspired by the life of Anton Chekhov and revolves around 15 Russian characters who coincidentally all end up at a wedding reception in New York City where Chekov appears. It was produced by the Meadows School of the Arts. “Miyagawa allows us to retain some belief in the idea of progress, but is skeptical that we will ever get back to any sort of Eden,” wrote the Dallas Morning News's critic.

The Antigone Project (2004)' was created by Miyagawa and Sabrina Peck, and premiered at the Women's Project Theatre. The project is a play in five parts, each part having its own storyline and was written by a different playwright. The five playwrights who wrote in this play are Miyagawa, Tanya Barfield, Karen Hartman, Lynn Nottage and Caridad Svich. Each story is in response to the Patriot Act and incorporates a character named Antigone, inspired by the character written by Sophocles. Red Again is the title of Miyagawa's piece and is set in the underworld. The story is the final piece in the play and revolves around characters based on Ismene and Haemon (22). The play received mixed reviews from critics.

Thousand Years Waiting (2006) is about a woman in present-day New York City reading a memoir of a Japanese woman from a thousand years ago who is reading The Tale of Genji. The play employs Bunkaru dances. The play was co-produced by Crossing Jamaica Avenue and Performance Space 122. Caridad Svich from The Brooklyn Rail said, “Thousand Years Waiting exemplifies Miyagawa’s tender and celebratory quality as a dramatist, and her ability to crystallize dramatic moments with grace.”

I Have Been to Hiroshima Mon Amour (2009) was produced at the Voice & Vision Theater at part of the Hiroshima Project at Ohio Theatre. Written as a response to the famous 1959 film Hiroshima mon amour, the play follows three stories taking place at different points in time. The first follows a French actor who falls in love with a man in Hiroshima, the second is about a man's fiancée who becomes a victim of the bomb, and the third revolves around three students in New york City who watch the 1959 film and argue about it. Miyagawa said she wrote this film because, “I was annoyed by the appropriation of the city’s tragedy by the French female protagonist. How could one person’s loss possibly be thought of as a metaphor for the deaths of one hundred thousand people?”. Martin Harries, a NYU English professor, praises the play, “There are many plays that look like they want to be movies. There are too few that take them on in meaningful, craft, theatrical ways. Here is one.”

I Came to Look for You on Tuesday (2013) premiered at the La MaMa Experimental Theatre Club. Miyagawa was inspired to write the play after the 2011 Tōhoku earthquake and tsunami affected her family in Japan. She and the director, Alice Reagan, held salons where people could share their own personal stories of reunion as part of The Tuesday Following. The play follows Maia who was saved by her mother's sacrifice in a Tsunami and how she reunited with her father who was distraught by her mother's death. BroadwayWorld.com says, “I Came to Look for You on Tuesday is a surprising and mythical story, by turns poignant and humorous, about our need to reconnect”. The Huffington Post added, “Overall, this production is creative, engaging, and quite brave.”

This Lingering Life (2015) premiered at the Theatre of Yugen. The play was inspired by 14th century Japanese Noh plays, which Miyagawa studied in Japan during her Radcliffe Institute for Advanced Study Fellowship. The play retells nine ancient Japanese stories with 27 characters, all which have no names. Miyagawa said in an interview that the characters, “they are identified by their types, such as Crazy Woman, Mystical Warrior, Woman with Tragic Hair, and Gangster on the Run, in an attempt to create sympathetic characters without making them into our neighbors.” The play received critical acclaim. The Huffington Post said, “Miyagawa's plays, this one especially, sit somewhere between this world and another world. They also commit so fully to their own aesthetic that I usually find myself pondering the fascinating rules of this alternate existence hours or even days later (this lingering life indeed).” The New Yorker praised the play as "clever, stylish, and often funny.”

== Other notable works ==
Several of Miyagawa's plays have been published in two books. Thousand Years Waiting and Other Plays was published by Seagull Books and includes Thousand Years Waiting, Comet Hunter, Leaving Eden, The Awakening, FireDance, Broken Morning, and Red Again. All plays in the book explore the themes of memory and identity. A review from Martin Harris said,"Chiori Miyagawa adamantly refuses to provide those signposts that more comforting dramatists leave to reassure audiences. The force of her work lies in its jarring historical and cultural discontinuities, its mixture of brutality and beauty, its disorienting verbal and visual impact."

American Dreaming and Other Plays includes Jamaica Avenue, Yesterday’s Window, Antigone’s Red, I Have Been to Hiroshima Mon Amour, and America Dreaming. It was published by NoPassport Press. All plays in the book have some Japanese influence.

Miyagawa has written numerous plays that were not put into production, including a Winter’s Captive, Comet Hunter, Leaf, Way to Curaçao, Cute Cats, and Antigone’s Red.

Other than writing plays, Miyagawa has also written poetry that has been published in the Asian American Policy Review. She has also written creative nonfiction prose that has been published in Black Warrior Review and Ecotone, a literary journal published by the University of North Carolina at Wilmington.

== Projects ==
'The Tuesday Following' was a project created to accompany Miyagawa's play I Came to Look For You On Tuesday. The project consisted of street art installations and reunion salons in New York City that explored reunions after natural disasters and wartime.

'The Dream Act Union' was formed to raise awareness for the DREAM Act, which was a legislative proposal to give legal status to undocumented youth. A group of seven female playwrights including Miyagawa wrote a collective play named Dream Acts as part of the project.

'Hibakusha Stories Arts and Science Initiatives' is an organization that advocates to the young generation to build a nuclear-free world. Miyagawa conducts play-writing workshops with high school students in New York City to respond to the story of Hiroshima survivor Shigeko Sasamori.

'The Hiroshima project' was a project created to accompany I Have Been to Hiroshima Mon Amour. It consisted of the premiere of the play, a screening of White Light/Black Rain: The Destruction of Hiroshima and Nagasaki, a series of readings of Japanese plays, and panel discussions regarding the bombings. The project was produced by Voice & Vision Theater and Crossing Jamaica Avenue.

== Awards ==
- New York Foundation for the Arts Playwriting Fellowship
- McKnight Playwriting Fellowship from the Playwrights' Center
- Van Lier Playwriting Fellowship
- Asian Cultural Council Fellowship
- Rockefeller Bellagio Residency Fellowship
- Radcliffe Institute for Advanced Study Fellowship at Harvard University
- Rockefeller Multi-Arts Production Fund (twice)
- Beinecke Playwright-in-Residence at Yale School of Drama
