= Sarah Gancher =

American playwright

Sarah Gancher is an American playwright. Her play Russian Troll Farm: A Workplace Comedy opened at the Vineyard Theatre in winter 2024, and her works have also been produced or developed at London’s National Theatre, Edinburgh’s Traverse Theatre, The Public, New York Theater Workshop, Playwrights Horizons, The Vineyard, The Atlantic, Berkeley Rep, Steppenwolf, New York Stage and Film, Ars Nova, WP Theatre, The Flea, La Jolla Playhouse, Seattle Rep, Geva Theatre, Hartford Stage, RoundHouse, Forward Theatre, Mosaic (DC), P73, NYC Summerstage, and Telluride Theatre.

== Early life ==
Gancher was raised in Oakland, California and attended Maybeck High School.

== Career ==
Gancher has written two musicals with the rock band The Bengsons: "The Lucky Ones" and "Hundred Days," both of which received critical acclaim. She was also the collaborating playwright on "Mission Drift," a musical about capitalism and the myth of the frontier, which toured internationally and received numerous awards and nominations. In addition to her work in theater, Gancher has written for Blue Man Group, Cirque du Soleil, and Madison Square Garden, and has worked behind the scenes at The Colbert Report, The Metropolitan Opera Guild, The Big Apple Circus, and Norway’s Stellapolaris. Gancher currently teaches playwriting at NYU Tisch's Department of Dramatic Writing and The New School's MFA Playwriting program. She is a jazz and bluegrass violinist. She holds an MFA from NYU.

== Personal life ==
Gancher resides in Ridgewood, Queens with her husband and son.

== Awards ==
Special Citation Obie Award: "Russian Troll Farm"

Richard Rodgers Award for Musical Theatre

New York Stage and Film Founder’s Award

== Plays (full length) ==
- I'll Get You Back Again
- Duet
- The Place We Built
- Klauzál Square
- Seder
- Lovebird With a Mirror
- Russian Troll Farm: A Workplace Comedy
- The Wind And The Rain

== Plays (short) ==
- Settlers of Catan
- Budapest December 2011
- 1978 Verbatim
- Five Mothers
- The Great Sacrifice
- In This Place
- Anniversary
