= Youth Theatre =

Youth Theatre or Youth Theater may refer to:

== Generic ==
- Theatre for Early Years
- Theatre for Young Audiences
- Young Spectator's Theatre

== Australia ==
- Perth Youth Theatre
- Platform Youth Theatre
- Track Youth Theatre

== United Kingdom ==
- Birmingham Youth Theatre
- Burnley Youth Theatre
- Croydon Youth Theatre Organisation
- Everyman and Playhouse Youth Theatre
- Manchester Youth Theatre
- Middlesbrough Youth Theatre
- Musical Youth Theatre Company
- National Youth Music Theatre
- National Youth Theatre
- Oxford Youth Theatre
- PACE Youth Theatre
- Scottish Youth Theatre
- Stamford Senior Youth Theatre
- Youth Music Theatre UK
- Zenith Youth Theatre Company

== United States ==
- Christian Youth Theater
- Modjeska Youth Theater Company
- Mosaic Youth Theatre of Detroit
- New Jersey Youth Theatre
- Milwaukee Youth Theatre
- TADA! Youth Theater
- Valley Youth Theatre

== Other ==
- Bryantsev Youth Theatre, Russia
- Chuvash State Youth Theater, Russia
- Estonian State Youth Theater, Estonia
- Independent Youth Theatre, Ireland
- Kiev Academic Youth Theatre, Ukraine
- Mostar Youth Theatre, Bosnia and Herzegovina
- Mostar Youth Theatre 1974, Bosnia and Herzegovina
- National Youth Theatre Company, New Zealand
- Novi Sad Youth Theatre, Serbia
- Slovenian Youth Theatre, Slovenia
- Workers' Youth Theatre, USSR
- Youth Theatre on the Fontanka, Russia
- Turkmen National Theatre of Youth

== See also ==
- Children's Theatre (disambiguation)
- Young Theatre
- Carousel Theatre For Young People
- Manitoba Theatre for Young People
