= Tea Alagic =

American stage director

- Tea Alagić
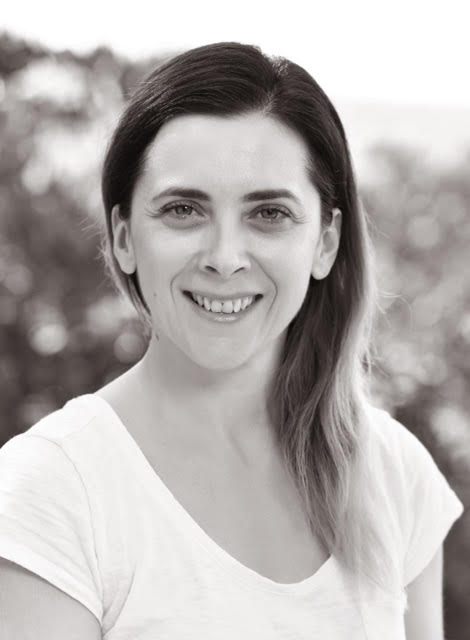
- Tea Alagic (2017)]
- Born: 1972 (age 53–54); Mostar, Bosnia and Herzegovina
- Education: Charles University Academy of Performing Arts (1997); Yale Drama School (2007)
- Occupations: Stage director and creator of devised theater
- Employer: The New School for Drama
- Children: 1

Tea Alagic (sometimes written Tea Alagić; born 1972) is a Bosnian-American stage director and creator of devised theater. Her productions include the premiere of The Brothers Size by Tarell Alvin McCraney, the U.S premieres of plays by Austrian playwright and Nobel Laureate Elfriede Jelinek, the revival of Passing Strange by Stew and Heidi Rodewald, and the Off-Broadway play Fear at the Lucille Lortel Theatre.

== Biography ==
=== Early life ===
Alagic was born in Mostar, Bosnia and Herzegovina, in 1972. She made her acting debut at age 14 at the Mostar Youth Theatre, where she performed until she left the city in 1992 because of the Bosnian War.

For the next five years, Alagic lived in Munich, Germany and Prague, Czech Republic. She attended Charles University Academy of Performing Arts in Prague and obtained her BFA in Acting in 1997.

=== Acting career ===
After graduating, she began a career as an actor and a creator of devised work, working across Europe and North America. During this time, she worked with experimental artists theatre directors Ariane Mnouchkine, Simon McBurney, Robert Lepage, and Richard Foreman.

From 1998 to 2001, Alagic worked as a co-creator and performer in Ex-Machina's Geometry of Miracles, directed by Robert Lepage, a performance piece based on the life and work of designer Frank Lloyd Wright. Alagic performed in the full world tour. Alagic moved in 2003 to New York City, where she performed in Richard Foreman's Panic (How to Be Happy) with the Ontological-Hysteric Theater.

=== Directing career ===
In New York City, Alagic also worked as a director and deviser, creating ensemble and solo shows, including The Filament Cycle, One Day in Moscow, and Men Have Called Me Mad. She collaborated with Daniel Alexander Jones on his play Book of Daniel in Austin, Texas.

Alagic was accepted to the Directing program at Yale Drama School in 2004, and obtained her MFA in Directing in 2007. While at Yale, Alagic collaborated with Tarell Alvin McCraney, Amy Herzog, Lauren Feldman, and Gonzalo Rodriguez Risco. In 2006, for her final thesis project, Alagic wrote and directed the play Zero Hour, based on her personal experience in the Bosnian War.

In 2006, Alagic returned to New York City with the world premiere of The Brothers Size by Tarell Alvin McCraney. She directed the New York premiere at the Public Theatre's Under the Radar Festival in 2007, which was followed by a full production at the Public (co-produced by The Foundry Theatre). The Brothers Size was nominated for Best Play at the Lucille Lortel Awards in 2008. She has directed productions of The Brothers Size at the Old Globe (San Diego, California), the Studio Theatre (Washington, DC), the Abbey Theatre (Dublin, Ireland), and the Actor's Theatre of Louisville (Louisville, Kentucky).

In 2013, Alagic directed the North American premiere of Jackie by the Nobel Laureate Elfriede Jelinek. The show was nominated for the Lucile Lortel Award for the Best Solo Show and Best Sound Design. Alagic was as of 2013 the only director to stage Jelinek's works in the United States.

Alagic directed Enrico Colantoni and Alex Garfin in the Off-Broadway play Fear at the Lucille Lortel Theatre in 2019.

She as of 2025 teaches theater directing at The New School for Drama in New York City, where she serves as co-head of the MFA directing department.

=== Personal life ===
Alagic lives in Manhattan in New York City, and is married to photographer Slaven Vlasic. They have a child.

== Work ==
=== Directing credits ===
- 2015: Washeteria by Charise Castro Smith, SohoRep
- 2015: The Brothers Size by Tarell Alvin McCraney, Actors Theatre of Louisville, Kentucky
- 2014: 4,000 Miles by Amy Herzog, Asolo Rep, Sarasota FL
- 2013: Romeo and Juliet by William Shakespeare, Classic Stage Company
- 2013: Jackie by Elfriede Jelinek, Women's Project, City Center Stage II
- 2013: Venus in Fur by David Ives, Asolo Rep, Sarasota FL
- 2013: The Brothers Size by Tarell Alvin McCraney, The Old Globe, San Diego, CAP
- 2012: Petty Harbour by Martyna Majok, Carlotta Festival YSD
- 2012: Man of La Mancha by Dale Wasserman, The Burning Coal Theater, NC
- 2011: Lidless by Frances YaChu Cowing, Soho Rep (produced by Page 73)
- 2011: Waking Up by Cori Thomas, Ensemble Studio Theater
- 2011: Anon(ymous) by Naomi Iizuka, Hispanic Cultural Center, Albuquerque
- 2009: Binibon by Jack Womack, The Kitchen
- 2007: The Brothers Size by Tarell McCraney, The Public Theater
- 2006: Zero Hour by Tea Alagic, Yale School of Drama, New Haven

== Awards and nominations ==
- 2008: The Lucille Lortel Award Nomination for Best Play – The Brothers Size
- 2013: The Lucile Lortel Award Nomination for Best Solo Show and Best Sound – Jackie
- 2002: Edinburgh International Fringe First Award – Al-Hamlet Summit
