= Children's Theatre =

Children's theatre is a theatre for younger audiences.

Children's Theatre or Children's Theater may also refer to:

- Theatre for Early Years, blanket term for theatrical events designed for audiences of pre-school children
- Youth Theatre

== Individual theatres ==
=== Europe ===
- Baku Children's Theatre
- Branko Mihaljević Children's Theatre
- Orna Porat Children's Theater
- Stretford Children's Theatre

=== Nordamarica ===
- Birmingham Children's Theatre
- Children's Theatre Company
- Children's Theatre in the Woods
- Dallas Children's Theater
- Delaware Children's Theatre
- First Stage Children's Theater
- InterAction Children's Theatre
- Mill Run Children's Theatre
- Missoula Children's Theatre
- Montreal Children's Theatre
- Nashville Children's Theatre
- NBC Children's Theatre
- Oregon Children's Theatre
- Seattle Children's Theatre
- Silver Lake Children's Theatre Group
- Talespinner Children's Theatre
