= Regal Theatre, Perth =

Theatre in Subiaco, Western Australia

Regal Theatre
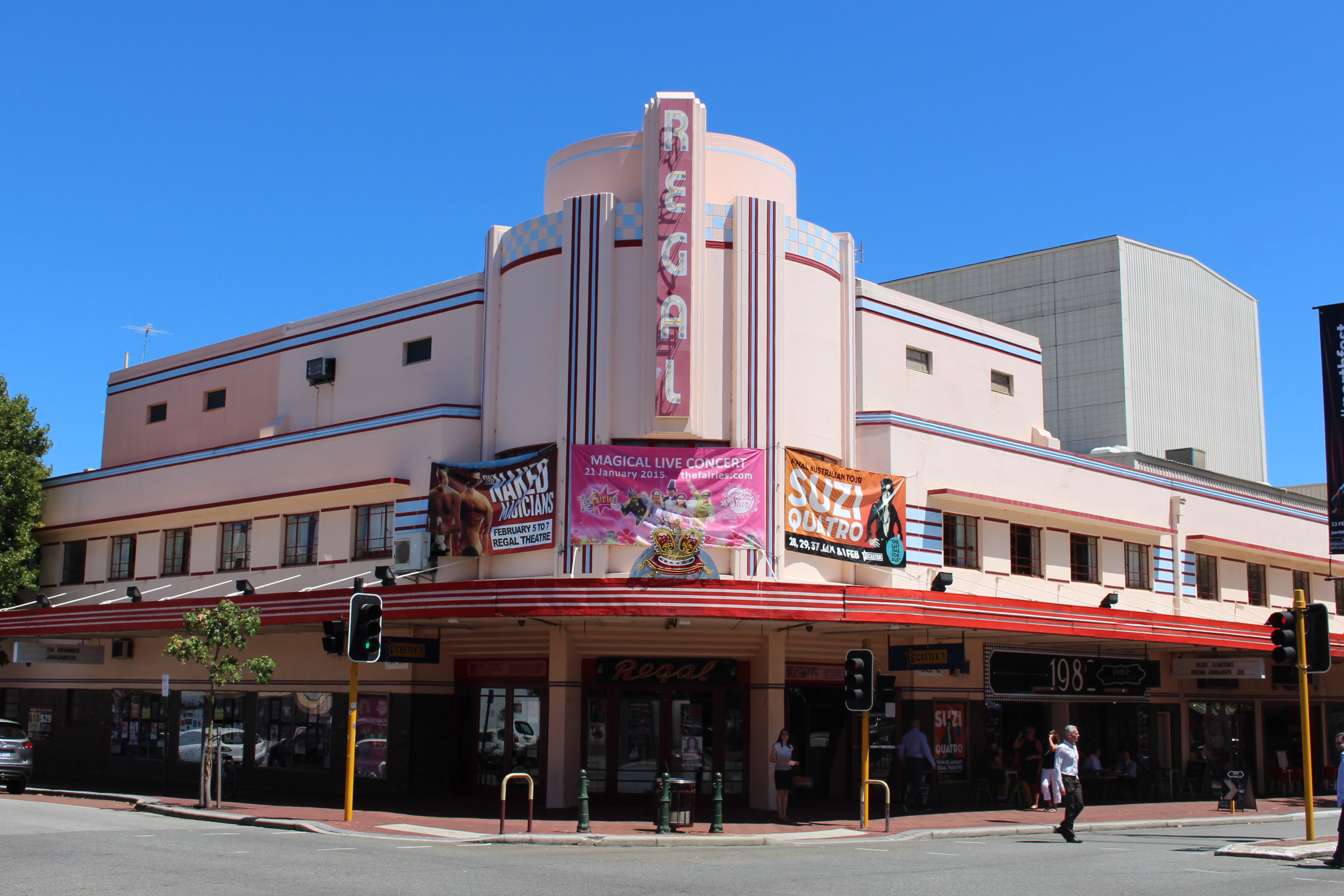
- Regal Theatre, cnr Hay Street and Rokeby Road

General information
- Architectural style: Art Deco
- Location: 474 Hay Street, Subiaco, Australia
- Coordinates: 31.9469°S 115.8238°E
- Construction started: 1936
- Inaugurated: 27 April 1938
- Client: Coade and A.T. Hewitt
- Landlord: Baker Trust

Design and construction
- Architect: William G. Bennett

Website
- www.regaltheatre.com.au

Western Australia Heritage Register
- Type: State Registered Place
- Designated: 28 February 1995
- Reference no.: 2454

The Regal Theatre is a fine Art Deco theatre located in the Perth suburb of Subiaco in Western Australia. It was built in 1937, and officially opened on 27 April 1938. The venue was built by grandparents of playwright Dorothy Hewett.

Named for King George VI who ascended to the throne during its construction, the theatre was originally for films only, but in 1977 it was converted into a live theatre. As of 2024 it is one of the few remaining theatres in Perth.

== Venue ==
The Regal Theatre is suited to all forms of theatre including stage shows, concerts, comedies, operas, film festivals and rock shows. Its seating capacity is 1074 people.

== Facilities ==
- 56 possible Fly Lines (32 Installed)
- 23.4 m^{2} (252 sq ft) orchestra pit
- FOH camera
- 5 dressing rooms
- 2 chorus rooms
- 1 green room

== Past performances ==
- David Strassman
- Beauty and the Beast
- South Pacific
- Hair
- The Complete Works of Shakespeare
- Stayin' Alive
- Floorplay
- Off Work
- Robbee Williams Show
- Respect
- Joseph and the Amazing Technicolor Dreamcoat - Performed by Perth Youth Theatre
- The Wizard Of Oz
- Menopause the Musical
- Art
- Peter Pan
- RENT07 (Rent)
- Wakakirri 2002 Heats
- The Phantom of the Opera
- Oliver Twist
