= The Brother/Sister Plays =

Trio of plays by Tarell Alvin McCraney

- Original language: English
- Written by: Tarell Alvin McCraney
- Genre: Drama

Premiere
- Date: 2009
- Place: New York City

The Brother/Sister Plays is a triptych of plays written by American playwright Tarell Alvin McCraney. The play premiered in 2008 at the Young Vic Theatre in London, before moving in 2009 to the McCarter Theatre Center in New Jersey. It then premiered Off-Broadway at The Public Theater later that year. The play has been widely praised for its naturalism, themes and McCraney's writing.

== Development ==
All three plays are set in the Louisiana bayou across several decades, culminating in a hurricane, akin to Hurricane Katrina. McCraney was inspired by the exploration of mythology and religion, specifically West African spiritual traditions when writing the plays. He named the characters of Oya, Ogun and Elegba after Yoruban deities.

McCraney wrote the play during his second year attending the Yale School of Drama, where he was an assistant to August Wilson. Oskar Eustis, then artistic director of The Public Theater, attended a reading and lauded his generational voice."

== Synopsis ==
=== A. In The Red and Brown Water ===
The main character of In The Red and Brown Water is Oya, a young woman who is a talented track runner. She sacrifices her ambition and a full ride scholarship to state university to stay home with her dying Mother. Oya’s life quickly becomes about relationships. An adoring young man and hard worker with a stutter, Ogun, is in love with Oya, but she is unable to resist the advances of the passionate “bad boy” Shango. Soon, Shango goes to war, and Oya moves in with Ogun. A long time friend, Elegba, visits Oya throughout her narrative and after learning he has fathered a child, Oya realizes that she is unable to have children. She pushes Ogun away at the same time that Shango returns, and shortly after, Oya learns he has impregnated a local girl, Shun. With no career and the inability to live up to societal expectations of being a mother, Oya spirals into madness to the point where she cuts off her ear in order to prove her love to Shango.

=== B. The Brothers Size ===
Set a few years later, we meet Ogun’s brother Oshoosi, who has recently been released from prison. Ogun is a hardworking man who does not want to see him go back to jail. He unsuccessfully tries to ground his free-spirited brother, whose only dream is buying a car and driving somewhere far away. While Ogun tries to get Oshoosi on the right track, Elegba, Oshoosi’s prison mate and occasional lover, just wants to have fun. He gifts Oshoosi with a car and the two go for a ride, but Elegba neglects to tell him that he is carrying cocaine in his duffel bag. A power hungry local sheriff discovers Elegba’s cocaine and instead of staying to face charges, Oshoosi runs home to Ogun. Ogun convinces his brother to run away, saying he will deny his brother’s existence when the police arrive. Oshoosi ends up fleeing to Mexico.

=== C. Marcus; Or the Secret of Sweet ===
Marcus; Or the Secret of Sweet is set several years in the future and introduces Elegba’s son, Marcus. Marcus is 16 and after having a dream in which Oshoosi comes to him, he seeks to discover what similarities he has with his recently deceased father. On the journey to learn more about his past, Marcus learns a surprising amount about himself as well. He meets Shua, a young man who has just moved into the area, who forces him to explore his own sexuality.

== Productions ==
A. The Brother Sister Plays

Company	Place	Dates	Ref.
Company One	Boston Center for the Arts, Boston, MA	October 28 – December 3, 2011	
The McCarter Theatre Company	McCarter Theatre, New Jersey	May 14 - June 21, 2016	

B. In the Red and Brown Water

Company	Place	Dates	Ref.
Young Vic	Young Vic Theatre, London	Oct 9 - Nov 8, 2008	
The Foundry Theatre	The Public Theater, NYC	Oct 21 - Dec 20, 2009	
Steppenwolf Theatre Company	Steppenwolf Theatre, Chicago, IL	Jan 21 - May 23, 2010	
The Fountain Theatre	The Fountain Theatre, Los Angeles, CA	2012–13	

C. The Brothers Size

Company	Place	Dates	Ref.
Young Vic	Young Vic Theatre, London	Nov 13 - Dec 12, 2007	
The Foundry Theatre	The Public Theater, NYC	Oct 21 - Dec 20, 2009	
Young Vic	Young Vic Theatre, London	Jan 19 - Feb 14, 2018	
Geffen Playhouse and The Shed	Geffen Playhouse, Los Angeles; The Shed, NYC	Aug 14 - Sept 08, 2024; Aug 30 - Sept 28, 2025	

D. Marcus; Or the Secret of Sweet

Company	Place	Dates	Ref.
American Conservatory Theater	The Geary Theatre, San Francisco, CA	Oct 29 - Nov 21, 2010	
Studio Theatre	Studio Theatre, Washington, D.C.	Jan 12, 2011 - Feb 20, 2011	
Guthrie Theatre	Guthrie Theatre, Minneapolis, MN	Sept 12 - Oct 05, 2014	

== Legacy ==
The works have been cited as inspiration for a. k. payne's play Furlough's Paradise, which was awarded the Susan Smith Blackburn Prize in 2025.

== Awards and nominations ==
=== 2008 Young Vic production ===
Year	Award	Category	Work	Result	Ref.
2008	Olivier Award	Outstanding Achievement in an Affiliate Theatre		Nominated	

=== 2009 Off-Broadway premiere ===
Year	Award	Category	Work	Result	Ref.
2009	New York Times	New York Times Outstanding Playwright Award	Tarell Alvin McCraney	Won	
2009	Steinberg Playwright Awards		Tarell Alvin McCraney	Won	
2009	Lucille Lortel Award	Lucille Lortel Award for Outstanding Play		Nominated	
2009	Lucille Lortel Award	Outstanding Lighting Design	Peter Kaczorowski	Nominated	

=== 2026 Off-Broadway Revival, The Brothers Size ===
Year	Award	Category	Work	Result	Ref.
2026	Drama League Awards	Outstanding Revival of a Play		Nominated	
2026	Drama League Awards	Distinguished Performance	André Holland	Nominated	
2026	Drama League Awards	Distinguished Performance	Alani iLongwe	Nominated	
2026	Drama Desk Awards	Outstanding Direction of a Play	Tarell Alvin McCraney and Bijan Sheiban	Nominated	
2026	Drama Desk Awards	Outstanding Music in a Play	Stan Mathabane and Munir Zakee	Nominated	
2026	Outer Critics Circle Award	Outstanding Revival of a Play		Nominated	
2026	Outer Critics Circle Award	Outstanding Lead Performer in an Off-Broadway Play	André Holland	Nominated	
2026	Outer Critics Circle Award	Outstanding Lead Performer in an Off-Broadway Play	Alani iLongwe	Nominated	
2026	Outer Critics Circle Award	Outstanding Featured Performer in an Off-Broadway Play	Malcolm Mays	Nominated	
2026	Outer Critics Circle Award	Outstanding Direction of a Play	Tarell Alvin McCraney and Bijan Shibani	Nominated	

== See also ==
- Yoruba Americans
