= Ro Reddick =

American playwright

- Education: Brown University
- Occupations: Playwright; composer
- Awards: Susan Smith Blackburn Prize
- Website: ronicareddick.com

Ro Reddick is an American playwright and composer, who won the 2026 Susan Smith Blackburn Prize along with playwright Hannah Doran. She received the 2026 Outer Critics Circle John Gassner Award for Playwriting for her play, Cold War Choir Practice.

== Career ==
Reddick grew up in Syracuse, New York and participated in children's choir. She was awarded an Master of Fine Arts by Brown University.

Reddick's play Cold War Choir Practice was inspired by Reddick's upbringing, taking place in her hometown of Syracuse during the Cold War 1980s, which she grew up in. Set in 1987 during the Cold War, it follows a young black girl who joins a peace choir. It was described by Benedict Lombe, who was one of the prize judges as "writing that is alive and audacious”. Time Out reviewed the 2026 Off-Broadway production at MCC Theater: the play was described as an "offbeat dark comedy" to which Reddick brought a "brand of ridiculous [that] adds a current of racial conflict".The New Yorker described Cold War Choir Practice as "absurdist", and The New York Times named the play a Critic's Pick.

The play won a 2026 Susan Smith Blackburn Prize by the theatre company Clubbed Thumb. She won the 2026 Outer Critics Circle John Gassner Award for playwriting, and was also nominated for the 2026 Lucille Lortel Award for Outstanding Play, the Drama Desk Award for Outstanding Play and Outstanding Music in a Play.

She is an artist-in-residence at the Vineyard Theatre as well as an Audrey Resident at New Georges.

== Personal life ==
She is queer.

== Plays ==
- Throwback Island, 2023
- Unlined | Hardcover | Layflat, 2024
- Cold War Choir Practice, 2025

== Awards and nominations ==
Year	Award	Category	Work	Result	Ref.
2026	Susan Smith Blackburn Prize		Cold War Choir Practice	Won	
2026	Lucille Lortel Award	Outstanding Play	Cold War Choir Practice	Nominated	
2026	Drama League Award	Outstanding Production of a Play	Cold War Choir Practice	Nominated	
2026	Outer Critics Circle Award	John Gassner Award	Cold War Choir Practice	Won	
2026	Drama Desk Award	Outstanding Play	Cold War Choir Practice	Nominated	
2026	Drama Desk Award	Outstanding Music in a Play	Cold War Choir Practice	Nominated	
2026	Dorian Award	Outstanding Off-Broadway Play		Nominated	
