= Drama Desk Award for Outstanding Music in a Play =

American theatre award

Drama Desk Award for Outstanding Music
- Awarded for: Outstanding Music in a Play
- Location: New York City
- Country: United States
- Presented by: Drama Desk
- First award: 1980
- Currently held by: John Patrick Elliot for Kenrex (2026)
- Website: dramadesk.org (defunct)

The Drama Desk Award for Outstanding Music in a Play is an annual award presented by Drama Desk in recognition of achievements in the theatre across collective Broadway, off-Broadway and off-off-Broadway plays (distinct from full musicals) produced in New York City. This category was introduced at the 1980 ceremony, presented sporadically (seven times) through 2008, and has been regularly awarded since 2009.

== Winners and nominees ==
Key

and bold indicates the winner.

=== 1980s ===
Year	Composer	Production
1980
1980	**Norman L. Berman**	**Strider**
1980	Richard Peaslee	Teibele and Her Demon
1980	Stanley Silverman	Bent
1981–89	—N/a	

=== 1990s ===
Year	Composer	Production
1990–91	—N/a	
1992
1992	**Jan A.P. Kaczmarek**	**'Tis Pity She's a Whore**
1992	Richard Peaslee	Akin
1993
1993	**Ladysmith Black Mambazo**	**The Song of Jacob Zulu**
1994
1994	**Stephen Warbeck**	**An Inspector Calls**
1994	Jonathan Dove	Medea
1994	Duke Ellington & Stanley Silverman	Timon of Athens
1995–98	—N/a	
1999
1999	**Jeanine Tesori**	**Twelfth Night**
1999	Steven Edis	Not About Nightingales
1999	Drew McVety	Corpus Christi
1999	David Van Tieghem	The Turn of the Screw
1999	Richard Woodbury	Death of a Salesman

=== 2000s ===
Year	Composer	Production
2000–01	—N/a	
2002
2002	**Willy Schwarz**	**Metamorphoses**
2002	Crispin Cioe	True Love
2002	Nona Hendryx	Blue
2002	Peter John Still	Cymbeline
2003–06	—N/a	
2007
2007	**Mark Bennett**	**The Coast of Utopia**
2007	Adam Cork	Frost/Nixon
2007	Gerard McBurney	Oliver Twist
2007	The Propeller Company	The Taming of the Shrew
2007	Ray Rizzo, Adam Rapp & Lucas Papaelias	Essential Self-Defense
2007	David Van Tieghem	Inherit the Wind
2008	—N/a	
2009
2009	**Dominic Kanza**	**Ruined**
2009	Mark Bennett	The Cherry Orchard
2009	Mark Bennett	The Winter's Tale
2009	DJ Rekha	Rafta, Rafta...
2009	Richard Woodbury	Desire Under the Elms
2009	Gary Yershon	The Norman Conquests

=== 2010s ===
Year	Composer	Production
2010
2010	**Branford Marsalis**	**Fences**
2010	Adam Cochran	A Play on War
2010	Adam Cork	Red
2010	Shelby Gaines & Latham Gaines	A Lie of the Mind
2010	Philip Glass	The Bacchae
2010	Hem	Twelfth Night
2011
2011	**Wayne Barker**	**Peter and the Starcatcher**
2011	Kathryn Bostic	Bengal Tiger at the Baghdad Zoo
2011	Lars Petter Hagen	Baby Universe
2011	Alan John	The Diary of a Madman
2011	Tom Kitt	The Winter's Tale
2011	Dan Moses Schreier	The Merchant of Venice
2012
2012	**Grant Olding**	**One Man, Two Guvnors**
2012	Mark Bennett	An Iliad
2012	Mark Bennett	Richard III
2012	Tom Kitt	All's Well That Ends Well
2012	Gina Leishman	Septimus and Clarissa
2012	Duncan Sheik & Suzanne Vega	Carson McCullers Talks About Love
2013
2013	**Glen Kelly**	**The Nance**
2013	César Alvarez with The Lisps	The Good Person of Szechwan
2013	Jiří Kadeřábek, Mahir Cetiz & Ana Milosavljevic	Act Before You Speak: The Tragical History of Hamlet, Prince of Denmark
2013	Eugene Ma	The Man Who Laughs
2013	Steve Martin	As You Like It
2013	Jane Wang	Strange Tales of Liaozhai
2014
2014	**Nico Muhly**	**The Glass Menagerie**
2014	Lewis Flinn	The Tribute Artist
2014	Elliot Goldenthal	A Midsummer Night's Dream
2014	Rob Kearns	The Life and Sort of Death of Eric Argyle
2014	Tom Kochan	Almost, Maine
2014	Duncan Sheik	A Man's a Man
2015
2015	**Arthur Solari & Jane Shaw**	**Tamburlaine the Great**
2015	Cesar Alvarez	An Octoroon
2015	Danny Blackburn and Bryce Hodgson	Deliverance
2015	Sean Cronin	Kill Me Like You Mean It
2015	Bongi Duma	Generations
2015	Freddi Price	The Pigeoning
2016
2016	**Philip Glass**	**The Crucible**
2016	Billie Joe Armstrong	These Paper Bullets!
2016	Estelle Bajou	Please Excuse My Dear Aunt Sally
2016	Shaun Davey	Pericles
2016	Tom Kitt	Cymbeline
2017
2017	**Bill Sims Jr.**	**Jitney**
2017	Daniel Ocanto, Graham Ulicny, & Sean Smith	Alligator
2017	Marcus Shelby	Notes from the Field
2018
2018	**Imogen Heap**	**Harry Potter and the Cursed Child**
2018	Justin Hicks	Mlima's Tale
2018	Amatus Karim-Ali	The Homecoming Queen
2018	Justin Levine	A Midsummer Night's Dream
2018	Adrian Sutton	Angels in America
2019
2019	**Jason Michael Webb and Fitz Patton**	**Choir Boy**
2019	Paul Castles and Jongbin Jung	Wild Goose Dreams
2019	Justin Ellington	Mrs. Murray's Menagerie
2019	Justin Ellington	The House That Will Not Stand
2019	Nick Powell	The Lehman Trilogy

=== 2020s ===
Year	Composer	Production
2020
2020	**Martha Redbone**	**for colored girls who have considered suicide/when the rainbow is enuf**
2020	Steve Earle	Coal Country
2020	Frightened Rabbit	Square Go
2020	Jim Harbourne	Feral
2020	Adam Seidel, Jane Bruce, and Daniel Ocanto	Original Sound
2021	No awards: New York theatres shuttered, March 2020 to September 2021, due to the COVID-19 pandemic in New York City	
2022
2022	**Bill Sims Jr.**	**Lackawanna Blues**
2022	Te'La and Kamauu	Thoughts of a Colored Man
2022	Michael Thurber and Farai Malianga (drum compositions)	Merry Wives
2023	**Suzan-Lori Parks**	**Plays for the Plague Year**
2023	Ben Edelman, Zane Pais, & Sinan Rafik Zafar	Letters from Max, a ritual
2023	Mauricio Escamilla	the bandaged place
2023	Ian Ross	Wuthering Heights
2023	Daniel Schlosberg	Montag
2024	**Will Butler**	**Stereophonic**
2024	Michael "Mikey J" Asante	The Effect
2024	S T A R R Busby and JJJJJerome Ellis	(pray)
2024	Dionne McClain-Freeney	The Harriet Holland Social Club Presents The 84th Annual Star-Burst Cotillion in the Grand Ballroom of the Renaissance Hotel
2024	Ben Steinfeld	Pericles
2025	No award given.	
2026	**John Patrick Elliot**	**Kenrex**
2026	Donald Lawrence	Oh, Happy Day!
2026	Stan Mathabane and Munir Zakee	The Brothers Size
2026	Johnathan Moore	The Imaginary Invalid (Molière in the Park)
2026	Ro Reddick	Cold War Choir Practice
2026	Darron L. West and Alexander Sovronsky	The Wild Duck

== Multiple win ==
2 wins

- Bill Sims Jr.

== Multiple nominations ==
5 nominations

- Mark Bennett

3 nominations

- Tom Kitt

2 nominations

- Richard Peaslee
- Stanley Silverman
- David Van Tieghem
- Richard Woodbury
- Adam Cork
- Philip Glass
- Bill Sims Jr.
- Daniel Ocanto
- Justin Ellington

== See also ==
- Tony Award for Best Original Score
- Outer Critics Circle Award for Outstanding New Score
