= Sarah Mantell =

American playwright

- Occupation: Playwright
- Notable work: In the Amazon Warehouse Parking Lot
- Awards: Susan Smith Blackburn Prize (2023)
- Website: www.sarahmantell.com

Sarah Mantell is an American playwright, whose work In the Amazon Warehouse Parking Lot led to them being awarded the Susan Smith Blackburn Prize in 2023 and a finalist in the 37th Lambda Literary Awards in 2025.

== Career ==
Mantell was awarded a Bachelors of Fine Arts from Rhode Island School of Design and a Master of Fine Arts from Yale School of Drama. In 2018 Mantell's work Everything That Never Happened - a revisionist interpretation of The Merchant of Venice - had its world premier. Reviewed by The Jewish Chronicle, it was described as aiming to "right the wrongs Shakespeare wrought". The Los Angeles Times described Mantell's version as "blisteringly feminist" and one that makes Shylock more human through new eloquence. Their 2021 essay 'Touch the Wound But Don't Live There' has been analysed in relation to mental health, boundaries and performance.

Nominated for the Susan Smith Blackburn Prize in 2025, Mantell was awarded the prize for their play In the Amazon Warehouse Parking Lot. Other nominees that year included Zadie Smith, Karen Hartman, a. k. payne, Anupama Chandrasekhar, amongst others. The play was partly developed during a MacDowell Fellowship. The characters are all over 50 years old - Mantell described how they wanted to write characters that could be "something my generation of actors could age towards". The New York Times reviewed a 2024 production and was sceptical of some of the characterisation. The play also led to Mantell being a finalist in the 37th Lambda Literary Awards in 2025.

They are non-binary.
