= IYT =

IYT may refer to:

- Independent Youth Theatre
- International Yacht Training Worldwide
