= Linda McLean (playwright) =

Scottish playwright

Linda McLean is a Scottish playwright, who won the Hector McMillan Award for Best Scottish Play 2023.

== Career ==
Linda McLean grew up in Glasgow She is recognised as part of a notable group of playwrights to emerge from the 1990s in Scotland. Her work is seen as experimental, poetic, and mysterious, with emotional depth.

Her plays include Glory on Earth, Every Five Minutes, What Love is, Any Given Day, Sex & God, strangers, babies, Shimmer, Riddance, One Good Beating, Thingummy Bob, an adaptation of Alice Munro's The View From Castle Rock, Go On, a response to Samuel Beckett's Krapp's Last Tape, and Castle Lennox, which won the Hector McMillan prize for Best Scottish Play 2023. In 2026 she adapted Denise Mina's crime novel The Long Drop for Glasgow's Citizens Theatre.

Many of her plays and adaptations have been commissioned or premiered abroad, including works such as Vile Sinner (Bogota, 2007), Love and Fascism (Istanbul, 2014), and Every Five Minutes (San Francisco, 2014).

Linda held the Creative Fellow post at the University of Edinburgh's Institute of Advanced Studies in Humanities in 2011.

She was Chair of Playwrights' Studio Scotland from 2008-2015.

She was artistic associate of Magic Theatre, San Francisco from 2012-2014.

== Awards ==
- Fringe First and Herald Angel for Riddance, 1999
- Herald Angel for Shimmer, 2004
- Finalist Susan Smith Blackburn Award for strangers, babies, 2008
- San Francisco Bay Area Theatre Critics Circle for Every Five Minutes, 2015
- Fringe First for Première neige / First Snow, 2018
- Hector McMillan prize Best Scottish Play for Castle Lennox, 2023

== Works ==
=== Plays ===
- One Good Beating (1997) Pub. Nick Hern Books (2015), (1999, incl in Family), (2015, incl in Scottish Shorts)
- The Price of a Good Dinner (1998)
- Corridors (1998)
- Riddance (1999) Pub. Nick Hern Books (1999)
- Olga (Adaptor) (2001)
- The Longer Now (2001)
- The Last Mission (Adaptor) (2003)
- Word for Word (2003)
- Happy Yet? (Adaptor) (2004)
- Shimmer (2004) Pub. Nick Hern Books (2004)
- Cold Cuts (2004)
- Like Water for Chocolate (Adaptor) (2006)
- Doch an Doris (2007)
- Strangers, Babies (2007) Pub. Nick Hern Books (2007)
- Reminded of Beauty (2009)
- The Problem (Adaptor) (2009)
- Any Given Day (2010) Pub. Nick Hern Books (2010)
- The Uncertainty Files (2010)
- This is Water (2010)
- What Love Is (2011) Pub. Nick Hern Books (2012)
- Sex & God (2012) Pub. Nick Hern Books (2012)
- Love and Fascism (2014)
- Every Five Minutes (2014)
- Control Z (2015)
- Thingummy Bob (2015)
- The View from Castle Rock (2016)
- A French anthology of her work translated by Sarah Vermande and Blandine Pelissiér, was published in 2015 by Actes Sud-Papiers.
- Glory on Earth (2017) Pub. Nick Hern Books (2017)
- Première neige / First Snow (2018) Pub. Dramaturges Éditeurs (2020)
- Go On (2021)
- Castle Lennox (2023) Pub. Nick Hern Books (2023)
- The Long Drop (Adaptor) (2026) Pub. Nick Hern Books (2026)

=== Radio Plays ===
- Take One Egg BBC Radio 4 Thirty-Minute Theatre (1997)
- In the Absence of Angels BBC Radio 4 Afternoon Play (2000)
- Spirit's Sunday Drive BBC Radio 4 Women's Hour Drama (2004)
- And So Say All of Us. Written with Dan Rebellato and Duncan Macmillan. (First broadcast on BBC Radio 3 on 2 May 2010)
- Zombie Rule Number 9. (First broadcast on BBC Radio Scotland on 17 April 2013)

=== Selected publications ===
- McLean, Linda (2011). Fractures (strangers, babies) (in French). Translated by Sarah Vermande & Blandine Pélissier. Paris: Theâtre Ouvert éditions.
- McLean, Linda (2013). "Essay". In Greig, David (ed.). Lovesongs to the Auld Enemy: Essays on England by Scottish Writers. Capercaillie Books. pp. 40–43.
- McLean, Linda (2013). "Essay". In Hern, Nick (ed.). My First Play. Nick Hern Books. pp. 99–100.
- McLean, Linda (2014). "Essay". In Colquhoun, Ross (ed.). Inspired By Independence. WP Books. pp. 31–33.
- McLean, Linda (2014). "Essay". In Greig, David (ed.). Dear Scotland. Luath Press. pp. 57–59.
- McLean, Linda (2015). Un jour ou l'autre suivi de Ce qu'est l'amour et Sex & God (in French). Translated by Sarah Vermande & Blandine Pélissier. Paris: Actes Sud-Papiers. Original Title: Any Given Day, What Love is and Sex & God
- Vile Sinners and other short plays, London: Independent, 2019.
- McLean, Linda (2022). COLD CUTS (Tranche froide) (in French). Translated by Sarah Vermande & Blandine Pélissier. Paris: Le Pôticha - Éditions.
