= Barbara Schneider =

American dramatist

Barbara Schneider originally from Germany, is an American playwright.

== Biography ==
Studied with Ed Bullins, at the New York Shakespeare Festival Writer's Unit and Cherry Lane Theater Mentor project. Was a member of Ensemble Studio Theatre, New York.

Teacher and Workshop Leader at Young Playwrights, Inc., New York: (1985–1995) Led extensive workshops, including residencies, in New York City public and private schools, from inception of a play to performance; at the Coterie Theatre in Kansas City, MO; Little Theatre in Raleigh, NC, and many others. Conducted the Young Playwright Festival’s annual Teacher Training Institute weeklong series of all-day playwriting seminars. Led workshops and seminars at University of Iowa/MFA-Playwriting Program.

Frequent guest professor/dramatist at the Berlin University of the Arts.

== Play productions (1978–1985) ==
- Verdict on the Shooting of a Police Officer (A play based on the famous/infamous Panther 21 Trial) Washington Square Church, New York City
- Turtles: New York Shakespeare Festival (Staged Reading) (Finalist for the SUSAN SMITH BLACKBURN PRIZE)
- Details Without a Map (Winner of the SUSAN SMITH BLACKBURN PRIZE) O’Neill National Playwrights Conference/Waterford, CT. (with Jo Henderson; Swoosie Kurtz; Peter Michael Goetz) Stage # 1, Dallas, TX. Actors’ Studio (Staged Reading) (with Ellen Burstyn; Lane Smith; directed by William Friedkin) Theatre Off-Park, New York City (with Jo Henderson; Robert Reilly; Margaret Barker) (Optioned for Broadway by Warner Brothers)
- Crossings Yellow Springs Playwrights Conference, PA. National Public Radio
- Flight Lines, commissioned by the Actor's Theatre of Louisville. Actors Theatre of Louisville - Festival Production
- Turbulence Philadelphia Festival Theatre - Annenberg Center
- Echo-Location Circle Rep (Workshop Production with Ed Seaman: Jeff Daniels; Amy Wright) New York State Theater for Cultural Affairs (Staged Reading) (with Jon DeVries; Josef Sommers) New American Play Festival/University of California Humboldt State 1986

=== Conceived of, developed and directed ===
- I. GEGENWIND (“CROSS-CURRENTS”) for the State Theatre of Dresden/Germany. (1997) In the course of a six-month residency as Artistic Project Director at the State Theatre of Dresden, she worked with a group of thirty young people of different backgrounds between the ages of 16-25 to create, write and perform a theatre work consisting of scenes, monologues, performance pieces and short plays. This work explored the often dramatic and unforeseen human consequences on these young people’s lives, their parents and friends, of the Fall of the Wall and the Re-Unification of Germany.
- II. IN FAHRT (“ON THE MOVE”) for the City Theatre of Leipzig/Germany. (1998) She conducted a six-month residency as Artistic Project Director at the City Theatre of Leipzig, resulting in the collaborative work of thirty-five young writers and actors (high-school students and nurses; electricians and mathematicians; computer programmers, medical students and drop-outs) exploring themes of love, violence and greed in the “New” Germany.

== Publications, honors and awards ==
- 1979-1980 Susan Smith Blackburn Prize for Details Without a Map
- O’Neill National Playwrights Conference
- NY State Council on the Arts Playwriting Fellowship
- Theater der Zeit (Theatre of Our Times), “The Heart of the Matter” a.o.

== Bibliography ==
- Flight lines; and, Crossings: two short plays, Barbara Schneider, Dramatists Play Service, Inc., 1983, ISBN 978-0-8222-0409-1
- Random House, “Recreation” (THE BIG TOP)
