= Elizabeth Kuti =

English actress and playwright

- Born: 1969 (age 56–57) Cheshire, England, United Kingdom
- Occupation: Playwright, actress, novelist
- Education: Oxford University (BA); King's College London (MA); Trinity College Dublin (PhD)
- Notable awards: Susan Smith Blackburn Prize; 2005–06 The Sugar Wife

Elizabeth Kuti (born 1969) is an English actress and playwright.

== Life ==
Kuti was born in Cheshire, England and graduated from Balliol College, Oxford with a degree in English, and completed her MA at King's College London. She is of partial Hungarian descent through her paternal grandfather, whose original surname Kipslinger was adapted to 'Kuti' to disguise its Germanic origins. In 1993 she moved to Ireland to study at Trinity College Dublin, where she wrote her doctoral thesis on eighteenth-century women playwrights. In October 2004, she joined the Department of Literature, Film, and Theatre Studies, University of Essex.

In 1999, the company Rough Magic produced her first work for the theatre, the completion of Frances Sheridan's eighteenth-century comedy A Trip to Bath, retitled as The Whisperers.

She has performed with most of Ireland's leading theatre companies including the Abbey and Peacock, Rough Magic, Loose Canon, Bedrock and the Corn Exchange.

She performed in Car Show; Dublin 1742, by John Banville; Melonfarmer, by Alex Johnston; Still, by Rosalind Haslett. She directed Stone Ghosts, by Sue Mythen.

== Awards ==
She won the 2006 Susan Smith Blackburn Prize.

== Works ==
- The Lais of Marie de France, (Andrews Lane Studio, Dublin Fringe Festival, 1995).
- The Whisperers (A Trip To Bath), (1999)
- The Countrywoman, (2000)
- Treehouses, (2000)
- The Sugar Wife. Nick Hern Books. 2005. ISBN 978-1-85459-863-9.
- The Six-Days World, (2007)
- Eighty Miles
- Funerals in My Brain, (workshop production at the Man in the Moon Theatre, London),
- Teen Lurve, (comedy-drama series for BBC Radio 5)
- Time Spent On Trains
- Fishskin Trousers Nick Hern Books 2013 ISBN 9781848423626 (Premier at The Finborough Theatre, London, September 2013)
