= Baku Children's Theatre =

Coordinates: 40.3967°N 49.9734°E

Baku Children`s Theatre
- Bakı Uşaq Teatrı
- Interactive map of the Baku Children`s Theatre area

General information
- Location: Surakhani district Garachuxur settlement, Art House after the name Gurban Abbasov, Baku, Azerbaijan

Website
- http://but.az/

The Baku Children's Theatre is a theatre for young audiences in Qaraçuxur, Baku, Azerbaijan, founded in 2001. It participates in national and international theatre festivals, cooperates with international organizations, and hosts a theatre studio for children with special needs.

== History ==
Baku Children's Theatre was established in 2001 by Order No. 260 of Baku City Executive Power and Order No 32 of the Baku City Culture and Tourism Department. Intigam Soltan has been the director of the theatre since May 1, 2002.

Nearly 70 children work and perform at the Theatre. A theatre studio for children with special needs was established in November 2009. The studio performed at the 4th National Festival of Contemporary Performances of Children and Youth with Disabilities in Azerbaijan and at the 2nd International Youth Festival for People with Disabilities in Moscow and was awarded a diploma.

Baku Children's theatre operated in the building of the Seaside National Park till May 23, 2008. From May 24, 2008, to March 31, 2013, the theatre was located in the House of Culture named after H. Sarabski. Since 2013, Baku Children's Theatre has operated in the Culture house named after G. Abbasov in Garachukhur settlement.

== Festivals ==
Baku Children's Theatre took part in the 34th Fajr International Theatre Festival which was held from January 21 to February 1, 2016, in Iran. At theatre festival in Sinop, Turkey, the troupe performed the play “Statue”.

The Baku Children's Theatre has organized national and international festivals, including the "Our Theatre" festival with the Union of Theatre Workers of Azerbaijan and the Turkic Peoples' Theatre in collaboration with Turkish performers.

Baku Children's Theatre also cooperates with international organizations such as the International Committee of the Red Cross and the Office of the Council of Europe.

== Plays ==
To date, the theatre has created about 100 artistic performances.

=== Humay's Dream ===
The performance Humay's Dream by Konul Shahbazova based on Elchin Afandiyev's work is for 3–7 years old children.

Always behaving badly with her toys, Humay sees toys in her dream. They do not play with her, punish her. Toys that are revived in the magical world are calling to help the Melaka of this magical world. Though she tries to calm them down, toys are protesting. Humay promises not to hurt her toys. The performance lasts 45 minutes.

=== Fidan and Goghal ===
The play Fidan and Goghal, which was based on the motives of Arzu Soltan's Goghal fairy tale, is about the stories of the goghal which Fidan's grandmother cooked for her. Fidan and her friend Nazbalinj and Yorgan go to the forest to find goghal who fled home. Many good moral values are instilled in the children in Fidan's example.

Intigam Soltan is the director of the performance designed for children aged 5–9. The duration of the play is 50 minutes.

=== Talking Doll ===
Author: Abdulla Shaig

Director: Ilhama Ahmedova

The ruler's daughter, Ramziya, who is left alone in the palace, is embarrassed to play with her toys. Every night she sees a talking doll in her dreams. This doll speaks as a human being. Ramziye throws all her toys, breaks them, does not eat, does not listen to her parents and wants a "talking doll". The desperate ruler brings one of the poor villager girls as a talking doll to the palace with the suggestion of the chief of the palace. After recognizing Inci, the talking doll, Ramziye understands her mistakes and asks his father to distribute her toys to poor children in the villages.

=== Rabbit's House ===
Rabbit's family lives a happy life in their home. One day a fox living in the neighborhood came to their house using a trick and closed the door inside leaving the homeowners outside of the house. Other residents of the forest such as dyer dog, tailor cock, and bear try to help the rabbits.

The performance that is mainly intended for elementary school students is aimed at highlighting the importance of education, science, and reading. The audience sees the example of forest animals helping their friends on a bad day, being kind, struggling with problems, accepting clever advice, and punishing bad deeds fairly.

== Artistic crew ==
- Screenwriter: Arzu Soltan
- Constructing artist: Sevda Mammadova
- Head of literary department: Leyla Hashimova
- Head of music department: Mahir Ibrahimov
- Head of costume room: Khuraman Balayeva
- Assistant Director: Afag Ahmadova
- Decorator artist: Zamina Allahverdiyeva

== Creative crew ==
- Director, Actor: Intigam Soltan
- Producer: Ilhama Akhmedova
- Actors: Tofiq Isgandarli, Soget Samadova, Rauf Huseynov, Javanshir Maharramov, Konul Gasimova, Niyaz Gasimov, Vusala Bashirova, Khayala Meydanova, Turkan Shahmarli, Shahin Kazimov, Rafael Muradkhanli, Niyaz Novruzov, Gunay Pirizade, Müdver Nematova

== See also ==
- Baku Puppet Theatre
- Azerbaijan State Academic National Drama Theatre
- Azerbaijan State Russian Drama Theatre
