= Alton College =

Coordinates: 51°9′21.93″N 0°58′32.72″W

HSDC Alton

Location
- Old Odiham Road; Alton, Hampshire, GU34 2LX; England

Information
- Former name: Alton College
- Type: Further education college
- Motto: Build your confidence, individuality and maximise your potential
- Established: 1978
- Local authority: Hampshire
- Ofsted: Reports
- Chief Executive and Principal: Mike Gaston
- Gender: Mixed Education
- Website: www.hsdc.ac.uk/study-with-us/alton-campus

HSDC Alton, formerly known as Alton College, is located in Alton, Hampshire, England. In addition to offering A Levels, the college provides an adult education service to the local population. It was built in 1978 and was one of the first institutions in the UK to be a purpose-built sixth form college. On 1 March 2019 it merged with Havant and South Downs College, becoming the third campus of the college.

== Notable alumni ==
Notable former students of HSDC Alton include:

- Michael Auger – singer
- Yvette Cooper – British Foreign Secretary since September 2025 and Labour Member of Parliament (MP) for Pontefract, Castleford and Knottingley.
- Daisy Dixon - philosopher of art
- Hannah Doran - playwright
- Alison Goldfrapp – musician
- Rebecca Harris – film producer
- Gwyneth Herbert – singer-songwriter
- Russell Howard – comedian
- Ranil Jayawardena – Conservative Party MP for North East Hampshire from 2015 to 2024.
- Amber-Jade Sanderson – Australian politician
- Chris Wood – cricketer
