= Leslie Ayvazian =

American actress (born 20th century

Leslie Ayvazian (born 20th century) is an Armenian playwright, educator and character actress.

== Career ==
Ayvazian is the recipient of the Roger L. Stevens (1994) and Susan Smith Blackburn Prize (1996) for her work Nine Armenians, which was produced at Manhattan Theatre Club. She also received a fellowship from the New Jersey State Council on the Arts and assistance from the New Harmony Writers Project in developing the play. Her numerous works have been produced off-Broadway, in major regional theatres, and in Poland and Slovakia. The Atlantic Theater Company produced her play Make Me as part of its 2008–2009 Stage 2 season.

Ayvazian has appeared in the films Working Girl (1988), Alice (1990) and Regarding Henry (1991), and has been a recurring guest star in the Law and Order franchise.

Ayvazian is an adjunct professor at the graduate school of Columbia University.

== Plays ==
- Deaf Day
- High Dive
- Lovely Day
- Mama Drama
- Nine Armenians
- Plan Day
- Singer's Boy
- Twenty Four Years
- Make Me
- Lost in Yonkers
- A Naked Girl on the Appian Way
- High Dive

== Selected filmography ==
- Working Girl (1988), as Dewey Stone Reception Guest
- Me and Him (1988), as Paramedic
- Alice (1990), uncredited
- Regarding Henry (1991), uncredited

== Television appearances ==
- Ask Me Again (1989), as Maxine
- CBS Schoolbreak Special

Flour Babies (1990), as Mrs. Emerson

- American Playhouse
- The Sunset Gang (The Home segment, 1991)
- Law & Order

Jurisdiction (1993), as Korolek
House Counsel (1995), as Priscilla Lempert
Homesick (1996), as Mrs. Karmel

- Law & Order: Criminal Intent

Gone (2005), as Ruth Stockton

- Law & Order: Special Victims Unit, as Judge Valdera

Limitations (2000)
Baby Killer (2000)
Abuse (2001)
Ridicule (2001)
Resilience (2002)

- The Jury

Mail Order Mystery (2004), as Lynette Bradwell
