= Tanja Miletić Oručević =

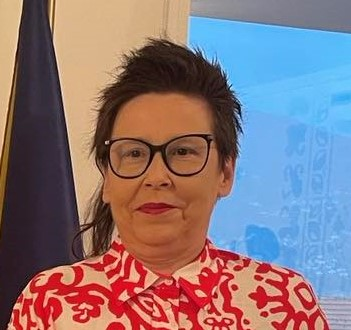
- Tanja Miletić Oručević (2021)
- Born: 6 February 1970 (age 56); Sarajevo, SR Bosnia, SFR Yugoslavia (present-day Bosnia and Herzegovina)
- Citizenship: Bosnia and Herzegovina
- Education: Ludwig Solski State Theatre School in Cracow
- Occupations: theatre director, academic lecturer, translator
- Years active: 1990–present

Tanja Miletić Oručević (born 6 February 1970) is a Bosnian theatre director, academic lecturer, and translator.

== Life and career ==
She was born in 1970 in Sarajevo and has graduated in 1999 from the drama directing department of the Ludwig Solski State Theatre School in Cracow. She has directed more than 30 professional theatre performances in theatres of Bosnia and Herzegovina, Macedonia, Poland, Italy and the Czech Republic. She was the co-founder of the Independent Theatre Studio Laznia in Cracow. Some of her first projects were performances produced at Laznia: Jean Genet's “Maids” and Slobodan Šnajder's “Snaks's Skin”. Tanja has been a Mostar Youth Theatre director since the summer of 2012.

Tanja is one of the co-founders of the Acting Department at the Dzemal Bijedic University's Faculty of Humanities in Mostar. She has been lecturing and teaching drama (acting, dramaturgy) in Bosnia and Herzegovina since 2000. Starting in 2007, as a Ph.D. student at JAMU in Brno, she has been working on international drama teaching programs (Erasmus and others).

Besides her native language, she speaks English, Polish, and Czech and has translated drama works from these languages. In 2017, she signed the Declaration on the Common Language of the Croats, Serbs, Bosniaks and Montenegrins. She has also published an anthology of contemporary Polish drama called "Mortal kombajn" in Sarajevo.

== Noted works ==
- Jean Genet's "Maids", Laznia Krakow
- Slobodan Šnajder "Snake's Skin" Laznia Krakow
- Mark Ravenhill "Shopping & F***ing", MESS Sarajevo
- Sarah Kane "Cleansed" MESS Sarajevo
- Feral Tribune Cabaret, Putujući teatar Hasije Borić, Sarajevo
- Damir Šodan" Night of..." Mostar Youth Theatre Mostar
- Maksim Gorkij "Lower depths" Bosnian National Theatre Zenica
- Irfan Horozović "Garden with fountain", Festival Dionysia Rome
- Almir Bašović "Re: Pinocchio", CTC Skopje
- Glassraum (The Glass Horizon), JAMU Brno and PQ+ Prague Quadrienalle international project
