= Daisy Dixon =

English philosopher and author (born 1989)

Daisy Dixon FHEA
- Born: Daisy Louise Dixon; 27 October 1989 (age 37)
- Education: University of Reading (BA); University of Cambridge (MA, PhD)
- Years active: 2018–present
- Employers: Peterhouse, Cambridge; Cardiff University
- Website: www.daisydixon.co.uk

Daisy Louise Dixon (born 27 October 1989) is an English philosopher of art and senior lecturer at Cardiff University. Her (Note: Dixon uses she/her and they/them pronouns.) debut book Depraved: The History of Dangerous Art was published in 2026.

== Early life ==
Dixon grew up in Alton, Hampshire. Initially intending to pursue art, Dixon took an art foundation course at Alton College. She graduated with a joint Bachelor of Arts (BA) in art and philosophy from the University of Reading in 2013. She completed a Master of Philosophy (MPhil) in 2014 and a PhD in 2019, both from the University of Cambridge.

== Career ==
Amid completing her PhD, Dixon became a junior Research Fellow of Peterhouse, Cambridge in philosophy and art. Her article in The Journal of Aesthetics and Art Criticism titled "Artistic (Counter) Speech" (2022) won the American Society for Aesthetics's Social Justice and the Arts Prize.

In 2022, Dixon joined Cardiff University as an assistant professor of philosophy. She was promoted to Senior Lecturer in 2026.

Faber & Faber acquired the rights to publish Dixon's debut non-fiction book Depraved: The Story of Dangerous Art in 2026. The book considers how to approach controversial art and the works of controversial artists throughout history, "from cave paintings to video games and from classical sculpture to extreme metal music". She suggests "immoral art" can be categorised by the acts it depicts, the behaviours or ideas it promotes, the character of the artist it reflects, and the exploitation used to create it. Dixon believes "It's perfectly compatible to hold that an artwork is immoral insofar as it exoticises the artist's child bride and exploitation of a colonised land, for instance, while also respecting its artistic innovations."

== Personal life ==
Dixon has spoken about receiving online harassment and misogyny, which "turned more sinister" following Elon Musk's acquisition of Twitter. This included death and rape threats, and deepfakes.

== Bibliography ==
=== Books ===
- Depraved: The Story of Dangerous Art (2026)

=== Chapters ===
- "Un-ringing the bell" in Grappling with Monuments of Oppression: Moving from Analysis to Activism (2024) edited by Christopher C. Fennell
- "Freedom—nature—Satan: on the beauty of black metal" in The Heaviest Ideas in the Universe: A Philosophy of Heavy Metal (2026) edited by J. Aaron Simmons and Benjamin McCraw

=== Articles ===
- "Lies in art" in the Australasian Journal of Philosophy (2020)
- "The artistic metaphor" in Philosophy (2021)
- "The whole picture: the colonial story of the art in our museums & why we need to talk about it." in the British Journal of Aesthetics (2021)
- "Novel assertions: A reply to Mahon" in the British Journal of Aesthetics (2022)
- "Artistic (Counter) Speech" in The Journal of Aesthetics and Art Criticism (2022)
- "Honouring and admiring the immoral: an ethical guide. Drawing the line: what to do with the work of immoral artists from museums to the movies" in Philosophical Quarterly (2023)
