= Jane Coles =

British playwright

- Writing career
- Notable awards: Susan Smith Blackburn Prize

Jane Coles is a British playwright. She won the Susan Smith Blackburn Prize in 1994.

== Works ==
=== Plays ===
- Backstroke in a Crowded Pool, 1993
- Cat with Green Violin, 1991
- Crossing the Equator, 1995
- Low Flying Aircraft, 1999
- Cat With Green Violin, 2004
- The Ultimate Fudge

=== Criticism ===
- Jane Coles (7 July 1993). "BETWEEN THE LINES". The Independent.
