= In the Amazon Warehouse Parking Lot =

American play

In the Amazon Warehouse Parking Lot a 2022 play written by Sarah Mantell, set at an Amazon shipping center in rural Wyoming. Sarah Mantell earned the Susan Smith Blackburn Prize for the play. It was written for a cast of seven female, non-binary, and transgender actors aged over 50; it was described as "queer ageing, capitalism, campfires and falling in love as the world ends".

== Plot ==
It follows a group of queer workers bouncing from job to job, due to rising sea levels, finding love amongst themselves during uncertain times.

== Reception ==
The play hosts a 51% rating on Show-Score.
