= InterAction School of Performing Arts =

Performing arts school in New Brunswick, Canada

Coordinates: 45.2689°N 66.0589°W

Interaction School of Performing Arts (abbreviated as InterAction), formerly known as 'Interaction Children's Theatre (IACT), is a performing arts school in Saint John, New Brunswick. It was founded in 2001 by Kate Elman Wilcott and is the only performing arts school of its kind in Southern New Brunswick. It serves hundreds of students each year through weekly classes, summer camps, and school outreach.

From 2013, it was located in the Trinity Royal Heritage Conservation Area, in the historical building of the Germain Street United-Baptist church. The building was sold and rezoned for housing development in 2025.
