= Susan Smith Blackburn Prize =

Award for English-language women playwrights

The Susan Smith Blackburn Prize established in 1978, is the largest and oldest playwriting prize for women's writing for English-speaking theatre. Named for Susan Smith Blackburn (1935–1977), alumna of Smith College, who died of breast cancer.

== Winners ==
- 1978–79 Mary O'Malley
- 1979–80 Barbara Schneider, for Details Without a Map
- 1980–81 Wendy Kesselman
- 1981–82 Nell Dunn
- 1982–83 Marsha Norman
- 1983–84 Caryl Churchill
- 1984–86 Shirley Gee
- 1986–86 Anne Devlin
- 1986–87 Mary Gallagher
- 1986–87 Ellen McLaughlin
- 1987–88 Caryl Churchill
- 1988–89 Wendy Wasserstein
- 1989–90 Lucy Gannon
- 1990–91 Rona Munro; Cheryl West
- 1991–92 Timberlake Wertenbaker
- 1992–93 Marlane Meyer
- 1993–94 Jane Coles
- 1994–95 Susan Miller; Kristine Thatcher; Naomi Wallace
- 1995–96 Naomi Wallace
- 1996–97 Marina Carr
- 1997–98 Moira Buffini
- 1997–98 Paula Vogel
- 1998–99 Jessica Goldberg
- 1999–00 Bridget Carpenter
- 2000–01 Charlotte Jones
- 2001–02 Gina Gionfriddo
- 2001–02 Susan Miller
- 2002–03 Dael Orlandersmith
- 2003–04 Sarah Ruhl
- 2004–05 Gurpreet Kaur Bhatti
- 2005–06 Amelia Bullmore for Mammals, Elizabeth Kuti for The Sugar Wife
- 2006–07 Lucy Caldwell for Leaves, Sheila Callaghan for Dead City, Stella Feehily for O Go My Man, Abbie Spallen for Pumpgirl
- 2007–08 Judith Thompson for Palace of the End
- 2008–09 Chloë Moss for This Wide Night
- 2009–2010 Julia Cho for The Language Archive
- 2010–11 Katori Hall for Hurt Village
- 2011–12 Jennifer Haley for The Nether
- 2012–13 Annie Baker for The Flick
- 2013–14 Lucy Kirkwood for Chimerica
- 2014–15 Tena Štivičić for Three Winters
- 2015–16 Lynn Nottage for Sweat
- 2016–17 Clare Barron for Dance Nation
- 2017–18 Alice Birch for Anatomy of a Suicide
- 2018–19 Jackie Sibblies Drury for Fairview
- 2019–20 Lucy Prebble for A Very Expensive Poison
- 2020–21 Erika Dickerson-Despenza for cullud wattah
- 2021–22 Benedict Lombe for Lava
- 2022–23 Sarah Mantell for In the Amazon Warehouse Parking Lot
- 2023–24 Ava Pickett for 1536
- 2024–25 a. k. payne for Furlough's Paradise
- 2025-26 Hannah Doran; Ro Reddick

== Special Commendation ==
- Beth Henley 1979–80†
- Joanna McClelland Glass 1980–81†
- Caryl Churchill 1982–83†
- Lynn Siefert 1983–84†, 1991–92†
- Sharman MacDonald 1984–85†
- Timberlake Wertenbaker 1988–89†
- Winsome Pinnock 1989–90†
- Migdalia Cruz 1990–91†
- Lesley Bruce 1993–94†
- Lisa Loomer 1993–94†
- Leslie Ayvazian 1995–96†
- Phyllis Nagy 1995–96†
- Judith Adams 1998–99†
- Julie Hebert 1998–99†
- Elizabeth Kuti 1999-00†
- Dael Orlandersmith 1999-00†
- Zinnie Harris 2000–01†
- Naomi Iizuka 2000–01†
- Joanna Laurens 2000–01†
- Julia Jordan 2001–02†
- Bryony Lavery 2002–03†
- Chloe Moss 2004–05†
- Jenny Schwartz 2007–08†
- Kimber Lee 2020–21
- Ife Olujobi 2020–21
- Justice Hehir 2023–24
- Else Went 2024-25

== Finalists ==
=== 1970s ===
- Tina Brown 1978–79
- Caryl Churchill 1979–80, 1982–83†, 1983–84*, 1987–88*
- Leigh Curran 1978–79
- Nancy Donohue 1979–80
- Mary Gallagher 1979–80, 1986–87*, 1989–90
- Pam Gems 1978–79, 1985–86, 1996–97†
- Joanna McClelland Glass 1978–79, 1980–81 †, 1983–84, 2004–05
- Valerie Harris 1978–79
- Beth Henley 1979–80†, 1987–88, 2005–06
- Tina Howe 1979–80, 1983–84, 1997–98
- Lenka Janiurek 1978–79
- Susan Miller 1979–80, 1988–89, 1994–95§, 2001–02*
- Philomena Muinzer 1979–80
- Marsha Norman 1978–79†, 1982–83*, 1983–84
- Edna O'Brien 1979–80
- Mary O'Malley 1978–79*, 1985–86†
- Barbara Schneider 1979–80*, 1980–81
- Karen Duke Sturges 1979–80
- Terri Wagener 1978–79, 1983–84
- Wendy Wasserstein 1978–79, 1981–82, 1992–93
- Victoria Wood 1979–80
- Olwen Wymark 1978–79, 1979–80

=== 1980s ===
- Kay Adshead 1987–88, 2001–02, 2005–06
- Mary Elizabeth Burke-Kennedy 1984–85
- Kathleen Cahill 1984–85
- Jo Carson 1989–90
- Paula Cizmar 1981–82†, 1982–83
- Kathleen Clark 1987–88
- Pearl Cleage 1983–84, 1993–94, 1995–96
- Kathleen Collins 1982–83, 1986–87
- Anne Commire 1988–89
- Constance Congdon 1985–86, 1995–96
- Trista Conger 1988–89
- Helen Cooper 1984–85, 1986–87, 2002–03
- Barbara Damashek 1987–88
- Donna de Matteo 1982–83
- Elizabeth Diggs 1981–82, 1987–88†
- Rosalyn Drexler 1983–84
- Carol Ann Duffy 1982–83
- Susan Dworkin 1980–81
- Barbara Field 1982–83, 1988–89
- Maria Irene Fornes 1985–86, 1987–88
- Donna Franceschild 1989–90
- J.E. Franklin 1981–82, 1989–90, 1992–93
- Lucy Gannon 1988–89, 1989–90*
- Lillian Garrett 1989–90
- Nancy Fales Garrett 1982–83
- Judy GeBauer 1987–88
- Shirley Gee 1983–84, 1984–85*, 1989–90
- Nikki Harmon 1988–89
- Catherine Hayes 1981–82
- Jacqueline Holborough 1987–88
- Debbie Horsfield 1984–85
- Velina Hasu Houston 1985–86
- Ann Jellicoe 1980–81
- Cindy Lou Johnson 1984–85, 1986–87
- Shirley Kaplan 1981–82
- Julia Kearsley 1980–81, 1982–83
- Margaret Keilstrup 1981–82
- Wendy Kesselman 1980–81*, 1989–90
- Gail Kriegel 1983–84
- Casey Kurtti 1987–88
- Shirley Lauro 1980–81, 1991–92
- Bryony Lavery 1980–81, 2002–03†, 2004–05, 2007–08
- Barbara Lebow 1985–86, 1994–95, 1995–96, 1997–98
- Rosie Logan 1986–87
- Sharman MacDonald 1984–85†, 1990–91, 1995–96
- Carol Mack 1982–83
- Emily Mann 1981–82, 1984–85, 1996–97, 1999–00
- Anne McGravie 1984–85
- Grace McKeaney 1981–82
- Ellen McLaughlin 1986–87*, 1989–90
- Cassandra Medley 1988–89
- Marlane Meyer 1986–87, 1988–89, 1989–90, 1992–93*
- Ann Mitchell 1981–82
- Lavonne Mueller 1980–81, 1986–87
- Melissa Murray 1985–86, 1986–87
- Louise Page 1982–83, 1984–85
- Sybille Pearson 1980–81
- Winsome Pinnock 1989–90†, 1991–92
- Aishah Rahman 1985–86
- Christina Reid 1984–85
- Susan Rivers 1984–85
- Milcha Sanchez-Scott 1986–87
- Julia Schofield 1987–88
- Adele Edling Shank 1981–82, 1982–83
- Kristine Thatcher 1985–86, 1994–95§
- Jane Thornton 1985–86
- Leonora Thuna 1986–87†
- Susan Todd 1981–82
- Alison Watson 1980–81
- Elizabeth Wyatt 1988–89
- Sheila Yeger 1988–89, 1990–91
- Shay Youngblood 1989–90

=== 1990s ===
- Judith Adams 1997–98, 1998–99†, 2000–01
- Hanan al-Shaykh 1996–97
- Jane Anderson 1990–91, 1991–92, 1992–93†
- Leslie Ayvazian 1995–96†, 2004–05
- Nicola Baldwin 1993–94, 1999–00
- Lynda Barry 1991–92
- Hilary Bell 1998–99
- Lesley Bruce 1993–94†
- Moira Buffini 1992–93, 1997–98*
- Katherine Burger 1996–97
- Sara Clifford 1998–99
- Sherry Coman 1990–91
- Kia Corthron 1997–98
- Migdalia Cruz 1990–91†, 1996–97
- Christian de Lancie 1993–94
- Ruby Dee 1993–94
- Dolly Dhingra 1999-00
- Ann Marie Di Mambro 1994–95
- Helen Edmundson 1993–94
- Margaret Edson 1993–94
- Elizabeth Egloff 1995–96, 1996–97
- Eve Ensler 1998–99, 2000–01
- Susan Flakes 1996–97
- Amy Freed 1993–94, 2001–02
- Rebecca Gilman 1998–99, 1999–00, 2004–05
- Sue Glover 1991–92
- Endesha Ida Mae Holland 1992–93
- Noelle Janaczewska 1997–98
- Catherine Johnson 1991–92
- Jennifer Johnston 1996–97
- Marie Jones 1999-00
- Julia Jordan 1996–97, 2001–02†, 2006–07
- Yazmine Judd 1998–99
- Adrienne Kennedy 1990–91
- Mary Lathrop 1991–92
- Maureen Lawrence 1990–91, 1994–95
- Liz Lochhead 1998–99
- Lisa Loomer 1993–94†, 2003–04
- Claire Luckham 1991–92
- Nicola McCartney 1997–98
- Jenny McLeod 1999-00
- Clare Mclntyre 1992–93
- Lois Meredith 1993–94
- Sally Nemeth 1994–95
- Lynn Nottage 1997–98
- Kira Obolensky 1998–99, 2005–06
- Tamsin Oglesby 1995–96, 2006–07
- Suzan-Lori Parks 1996–97, 1999–00, 2015–16
- Nu Quang 1992–93
- Theresa Rebeck 1994–95, 2002–03
- Jacquelyn Reingold 1994–95
- Anna Reynolds 1992–93
- Gillian Richmond 1990–91
- Kate Moira Ryan 1996–97
- Rose Scollard 1995–96
- Anna Deavere Smith 1992–93, 1993–94
- Diana Son 1998–99
- Susan Sontag 1992–93
- Shelagh Stephenson 1997–98†
- Elizabeth Swados 1991–92
- Freyda Thomas 1999-00
- Kathleen Tolan 1997–98
- Kay Trainor 1992–93
- Paula Vogel 1991–92, 1992–93, 1994–95, 1995–96
- Celeste Bedford Walker 1999-00
- Erin Cressida Wilson 1995–96

=== 2000s ===
- Rukhsana Ahmad 2001–02
- Claudia Allen 2002–03
- Neena Beber 2003–04
- Jean Betts 2003–04
- Gurpreet Kaur Bhatti 2004–05*
- Linda Brogan 2007–08
- Lucy Caldwell 2006–07
- Sheila Callaghan 2006–07
- Anupama Chandrasekhar 2008–09, 2022–23
- Julia Cho 2001–02, 2006–07
- Lin Coghlan 2003–04
- Alexandra Cunningham 2000–01
- April De Angelis 2005–06, 2023–24
- Lydia Diamond 2007–08
- Katie Douglas 2006–07
- Bathsheba Doran 2005–06
- Charlotte Eilenberg 2002–03
- Nancy Ewing 2000–01
- Stella Feehily 2006–07
- Kate Fodor 2002–03
- Amy Fox 2006–07
- Alexandra Gersten 2002–03
- Melissa James Gibson 2005–06
- Debbie Tucker Green 2002–03, 2005–06, 2018–19
- Linda Marshall Griffiths 2005–06
- Rinne Groff 2002–03
- Zinnie Harris 2000–01†, 2003–04, 2016–17
- C. Michèle Kaplan 2006–07
- Carson Kreitzer 2003–04
- Oni Faida Lampley 2005–06
- Young Jean Lee 2009–10
- Rebecca Lenkiewicz 2004–05
- Nell Leyshon 2006–07
- Anne Ludlum 2002–03
- Melanie Marnich 2004–05
- Mia McCullough 2004–05
- Heather McDonald 2002–03
- Lisa McGee 2007–08†
- Linda McLean 2007–08
- Abi Morgan 2003–04
- Julie Marie Myatt 2007–08
- Ann Noble 2003–04
- Meredith Oakes 2000–01
- Carey Perloff 2001–02
- Lucy Prebble 2003–04
- Heather Raffo 2004–05†
- Abbie Spallen 2006–07
- Polly Stenham 2007–08
- Victoria Stewart 2007–08
- Kelly Stuart 2001–02
- Polly Teale 2003–04
- Judith Thompson 2002–03, 2007–08*
- Katherine Thomson 2004–05
- Francine Volpe 2006–07
- Annie Weisman 2000–01
- Patricia Wettig 2004–05
- Tracey Scott Wilson 2001–02
- Sarah Woods 2000–01
- Karen Zacarias 2003–04

=== 2010s ===
- Clare Barron 2014–15
- Hilary Bettis 2018–19
- Alice Birch 2014–15
- Caroline Bird 2013–14
- Alecky Blythe 2014–15
- Clara Brennan 2014–15
- Sarah Burgess 2015–16
- Katherine Chandler 2014–15
- Elinor Cook 2017–18
- Zoe Cooper 2019–2020
- Frances Ya-Chu Cowhig 2014–15, 2019–2020
- Rachel Cusk 2015–16
- Lisa D'Amour 2014–2015
- Sarah DeLappe 2015–16
- Fiona Doyle 2017–18
- Lindsey Ferrentino 2014–15
- Aleshea Harris 2017–18
- Amy Herzog 2016–17
- Ella Hickson 2018–19
- Sam Holcroft 2015–16
- Charlene James 2016–17
- Anna Jordan 2015–16
- Anchuli Felicia King 2019–2020
- Kimber Lee 2019–2020, 2020–21, 2022–23
- Martyna Majok 2018–19
- Charley Miles 2016–17
- Dominique Morisseau 2015–16, 2016–17, 2019–2020
- Colleen Murphy 2017–18
- Lizzie Nunnery 2016–17
- Antoinette Nwandu 2017–18
- Zodwa Nyoni 2014–15
- Lily Padilla 2018–19
- Nina Raine 2017–18, 2018–19
- Ella Road 2018–19
- Bea Roberts 2015–16
- Anusree Roy 2017–18
- Tori Sampson 2017–18
- Heidi Schreck 2014–15, 2018–19
- Somalia Seaton 2016–17
- Jen Silverman 2016–17
- Penelope Skinner 2016–17
- Stef Smith 2019–2020
- Celine Song 2019–2020
- Ruby Rae Spiegel 2014–15
- Noni Stapleton 2015–16
- Tena Stivicic 2014–15
- Anne Washburn 2019–2020
- Lauren Yee 2017–18, 2018–19

=== 2020s ===
- Chiara Atik 2021–22
- Glace Chase 2020–21
- Roxy Cook 2023–24
- Francisca Da Silveira 2022–23
- Daniella De Jesús 2021–22
- Miranda Rose Hall 2020–21
- Maryam Hamidi 2022–23
- Sarah Hanly 2021–22
- Karen Hartman 2022–23
- Katie Holly 2022–23
- Zora Howard 2021–22
- Rhianna Ilube 2023–24
- Jasmine Naziha Jones 2023–24
- Sonya Kelly 2021–22
- Dawn King 2020–21
- Alex Lin 2023–24
- Lenelle Moïse 2023–24
- Hannah Moscovitch 2023–24
- Joanna Murray-Smith 2021–22
- Janice Okoh 2020–21
- Ife Olujobi 2020–21†
- Jihae Park 2020–21
- a.k. payne 2022–23, 2023–24
- Frances Poet 2020–21
- Zadie Smith 2022–23
- Beth Steel 2020–21
- Kae Tempest 2021–22
- Ruby Thomas 2022–23
- Amanda Wilkin 2021–22
- Lauren Whitehead 2021–22

== See also ==
- List of literary awards honoring women
