= A. k. payne =

American playwright

a. k. payne
- Education: Yale College; Yale School of Drama
- Occupation: Playwright
- Notable work: Furlough's Paradise
- Awards: Susan Smith Blackburn Prize
- Website: akpayne.com

a. k. payne is an American playwright, whose play Furlough's Paradise was the winner of the 2025 Susan Smith Blackburn Prize.

== Education ==
payne has a BA in English and American Studies from Yale College and a MFA in Playwriting from Yale School of Drama. They were awarded the Louis Sudler Prize for their undergraduate studies. During the latter period of study payne was taught by McCraney who they praised in an interview with the Los Angeles Times for his "horizontal leadership" and creating a positive space for students of color despite the elitism of Yale.

== Career ==
In 2023 payne was selected as one of the Rattlestick Theater's Van Lier New Voices Fellows. In 2022 their play Blooms was featured in Ensemble Studio Theater's 38th Marathon of One-Act Plays and praised by reviewer Elisabeth Vincentelli for its "tenderness and sympathetic humor". Their play Furlough's Paradise was the winner of the 2025 Susan Smith Blackburn Prize. The play premiered at the Alliance theater in Atlanta in 2024. payne's depiction of the American criminal justice system in the play was praised by playwright Tarell Alvin McCraney. The play follows two cousins who meet for a funeral - one is on a furlough from prison, the other a short respite from a tech job. In a review of the 2025 production at the Geffen Playhouse by the Los Angeles Times, it was compared to The Brothers Size by McCraney.

== Personal life ==
They grew up in Pittsburgh and have cited August Wilson - also from the city - as inspiration. payne is non-binary and uses the pronoun they.
