= Milwaukee Youth Theatre =

Theatre company based in the city of Milwaukee, Wisconsin

The Milwaukee Youth Theatre (MYT) is a theatre company for youth based in Milwaukee, Wisconsin.

Founded by Peter Daniels in 1991, MYT began in a small storefront theatre in the Bayview neighborhood of Milwaukee. MYT became incorporated and attained non-profit in 1992. Performances were held both in the storefront space and next door at the historic Avalon movie theatre. Daniels relocated from the city in 1997, and MYT was turned over to Therese Burazin. The Milwaukee Youth Theatre has since moved to the Eastside of Milwaukee to become a part of the nationally recognized Resident Artist Program at Lincoln Center for the Arts, an arts-focused middle school in the Milwaukee Public School system. In January, 2022 Harmonie Baker became Executive Director.

Each year MYT produces three to four public theatrical productions, accompanying tours to Milwaukee-area schools, and a variety of workshops. Milwaukee Youth Theatre provides many kids' their first chance to perform onstage and involves students in all aspects of production including costume design, set design, property management, stage management, direction, sound design, lighting as well as acting. MYT uses no adult actors and involves students ages 8-18 at no cost regardless of previous theatre experience.
