= Platform Youth Theatre =

Coordinates: 37°46′29.42″S 144°59′51.88″E

Platform Youth Theatre was a theatre company for 16- to 26-year-olds based in the northern suburbs of Melbourne, Australia. that was operational for eighteen years from 1998-2016. The Company was reflective of the cultural melting pot of the Darebin area, and was originally a program within the Darebin Council. It had a diversity of participants in its programs and a commitment to including marginalised young people (recent migrants, young people with disabilities and at risk youth) and a youth governance model.

Platform operated programs that dealt with multiple facets of the performing arts. These programs varied from group learning models to one-on-one mentorships, and were facilitated by professional artists from the Australian theatre industry. Platform's first production was in 1998. The company combined an inclusive cultural development process with the creation of art.

The public performance outcomes of all Platform's programs gave young people a voice.

Platform was awarded Australian Writers Guild Awards and Green Room Award nominations.

== Previous productions ==
- Platform @ La Mama 2015/15 (2015)
- Platform @ La Mama: Step Into the Unknown (2014)
- Platform @ La Mama 2013 (2013)
- Month @ La Mama (2012)
- Tenderness (2011)
- Post (2011)
- Crossed (2010)
- Provokateur 2010 (2010)
- Death - Crossed (2010)
- One is Warm in Winter, the Other Has a Better View (2009)
- Faith, Diversity and Difference Project (2009)
- Perstilence (2008)
- Enough (2008)
- Tenderness (2008)
- Dapper (2007)
- The New Write (2007)
- Golem of Rucker's Hill (2006/07)
- The Yellow Peril/Citizen Corps (2006)
- Cotton Wool and Camphor (2006)
- Test Pattern (2005)
- Faith, Hope and Surveillance (2004)
- Walt and the Paradise Plaza (2002)
- Shimmer (2001)
- Home (2000)
- Hogshairs and Leeches

== Supporters ==
The closure of the company was tied to the loss of ongoing support by the Australia Council of the Arts at the end of 2015 (in which PYT was one of ten out of thirteen youth arts organisations to lose funding), and Creative Victoria at the end of 2016.

Platform received support from:

- Creative Victoria (formerly Arts Victoria)
- Australia Council for the Arts
- City of Darebin.

== Leadership and artists ==
For the bulk of its operative years, Platform ran with a board almost entirely of young people aged 16–26.

In this time the company was variously headed by Rose Godde, Jim Rimmer, and Kath Melbourne; and variously administered by combinations of staff including Myf Clark, Michelle Lee and others.

Notable artists who've worked with Platform include Adam Cass, Patricia Cornelius, Christos Tsiolkas, Nadja Kostich, Susie Dee, Lucy Freeman, Leticia Caceras, Angus Cerini, Wes Snelling, Wally Gunn, Caitlin Dullard, Richard Vabre, Marg Horwell, Emma Valente, Kelly Ryall and Matt Scholten.

== Media quotes ==
"So much of what good theatre is all about is giving everything you've got to a performance, passionately and without self-censorship. Shimmer…is the embodiment of these ideals. It is community theatre at its most enriching, both for the performers and the audience." Melbourne Times

"No, it wasn't the MTC. But it was much, much better than any preconceptions of community would have had you believe. At shows end the packed audience gave rousing appreciation to all for delivering a night of heartfelt, engaging, but above all, entertaining - theatre." Jo Roberts, The Age
