= Tarell Alvin McCraney =

American playwright (born 1980)

- McCraney in 2026
- Born: October 17, 1980 (age 46); Liberty City, Florida, U.S.
- Education: DePaul University (BFA); Yale University (MFA)
- Occupations: Playwright; screenwriter; actor
- Writing career
- Notable awards: Windham-Campbell Literature Prize; MacArthur Fellow; Academy Award for Best Adapted Screenplay

Tarell Alvin McCraney (born October 17, 1980) is an American playwright. He is the chair of playwriting at the Yale School of Drama and a member of the Steppenwolf Theatre Ensemble.

McCraney co-wrote the 2016 film Moonlight, based on his own play, for which he received an Academy Award for Best Adapted Screenplay. He also wrote the screenplay for the 2019 film High Flying Bird and 2019 television series David Makes Man.

In 2023, McCraney was appointed artistic director of the non-profit Geffen Playhouse, in the Westwood neighborhood in Los Angeles, beginning with the 2024-25 season.

== Early life and education ==
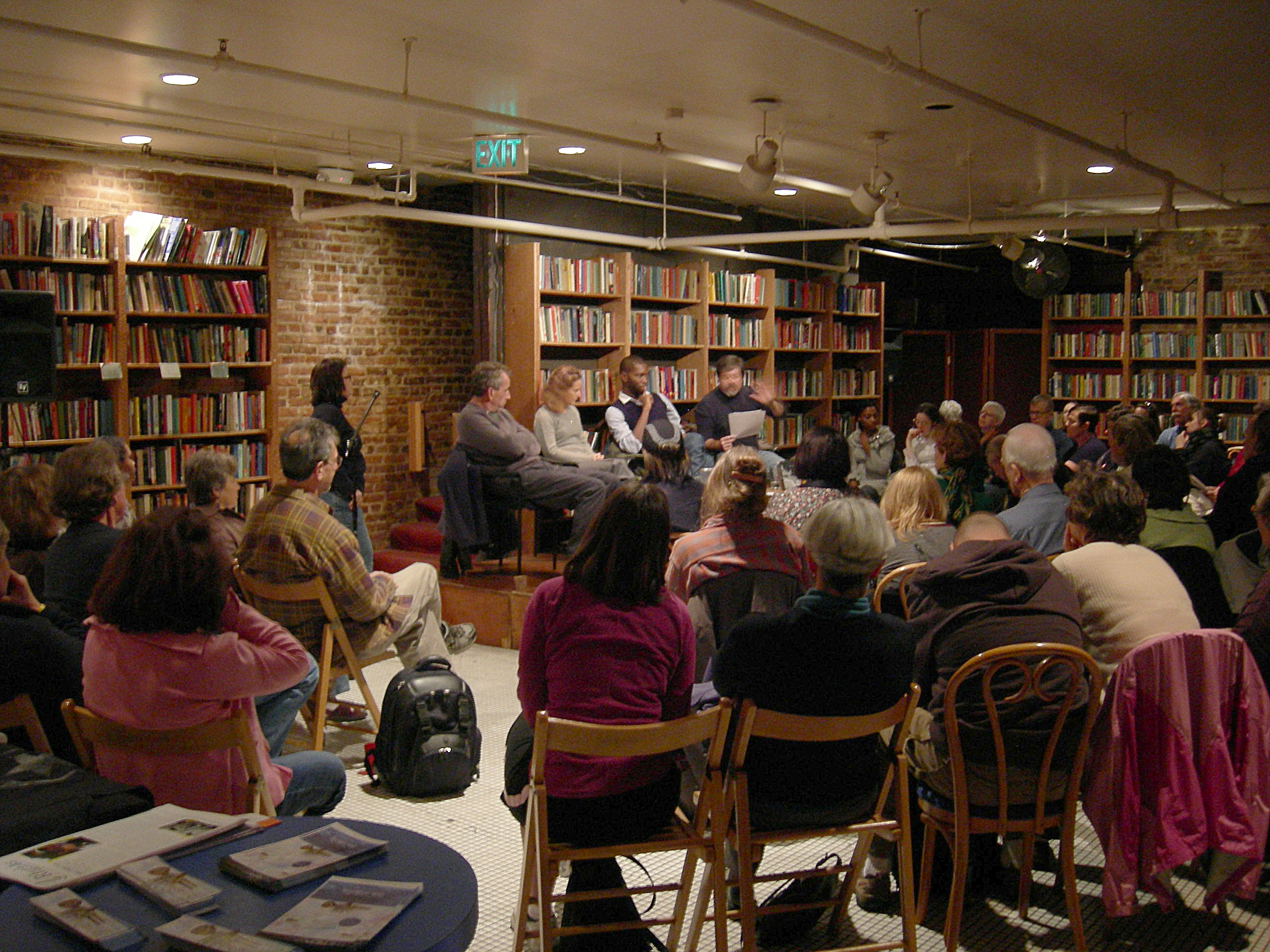
A reading at Elliott Bay Books, Seattle, Washington, co-presented with the Seattle Repertory Theatre, in association with Seattle Rep's staging of The Breach, a play based on Hurricane Katrina and its aftermath. At right, New Orleans Times-Picayune columnist Chris Rose, author of 1 Dead in Attic. To his right are Tarell Alvin McCraney, Catherine Filloux, and Joe Sutton, co-authors of The Breach.

McCraney was born on October 17, 1980, in Liberty City, Miami. He attended the New World School of the Arts (NWSA) in Miami, Florida. While attending NWSA, he also applied to and was awarded an honorable mention by the National YoungArts Foundation (1999, Theater). As a teenager, he was a member of an improv troupe directed by Teo Castellanos.

McCraney matriculated into The Theatre School at DePaul University and received his BFA in acting. In May 2007 he graduated from Yale School of Drama's playwriting program, receiving the Cole Porter Playwriting Award upon graduation. He also is an Honorary Warwick University Graduate.

== Career ==
As an actor, McCraney has worked with directors such as Tina Landau of the Steppenwolf Theatre Company in Chicago, Illinois, David Cromer, and B. J. Jones, artistic director of the Northlight Theatre (where McCraney co-starred in the Chicago premiere of Joe Penhall's Blue/Orange), and developed a working relationship with Peter Brook and Marie-Hélène Estienne of the Bouffes du Nord, Paris. He is a member of the D Projects Theater Company in Miami.

From 2008 to 2010, McCraney was the RSC/Warwick International Playwright in Residence at the Royal Shakespeare Company. In April 2010, McCraney became the 43rd member of the Steppenwolf Theatre Ensemble. In July 2017, he became the chair of playwriting at the Yale School of Drama.

=== Theatre ===
In summer 2006, McCraney, Catherine Filloux and Joe Sutton wrote The Breach, a play on Katrina, the Gulf, and American society, commissioned by Southern Rep in New Orleans, where it premiered in August 2007 to mark the second anniversary of the tragedy in New Orleans. The Breach also played at Seattle Rep in the winter of 2007.

While at Yale, McCraney wrote the Brother/Sister trilogy of plays, which are set in the Louisiana projects and explore Yoruba mythology. The triptych of plays includes In the Red and Brown Water, The Brothers Size, and Marcus; Or the Secret of Sweet. While they are often produced with In the Red and Brown Water coming first and then The Brothers Size and Marcus; Or the Secret of Sweet together on a following night, the plays are not in chronological order, but rather are "in conversation" with one another. It has been cited as inspiration for a. k. payne's work Furlough's Paradise.

McCraney's play Choir Boy premiered at the Royal Court Theatre in London in 2012, with its American premiere the following year produced by the Manhattan Theatre Club. The play follows young Pharus on his journey toward becoming the best choir leader in the history of the Charles R. Drew Prep School for Boys and trying to find out where he fits in with the rest of his peers. The 2019 Broadway production of the play was nominated for four Tony Awards, including the Tony Award for Best Play, and won the Tony Award for Best Sound Design of a Play.

In 2013, McCraney directed Hamlet for the Royal Shakespeare Company's Young Shakespeare program for GableStage in Miami. The same year, he adapted Antony and Cleopatra for the Royal Shakespeare Company, which placed the play in an 18th-century Caribbean setting. Reviews were mixed.

McCraney cowrote Ms. Blakk for President with director Tina Landau. The show was first performed by the Steppenwolf Theatre Company in Chicago in 2019. Based on a true story, the play follows drag queen Joan Jett Blakk (played by McCraney himself in the play's first production) in Chicago at the height of the AIDS crisis as she announces her bid to run for President of the United States.

=== Film ===
Moonlight, cowritten by McCraney and director Barry Jenkins, was based on McCraney's earlier semi-autobiographical play In Moonlight Black Boys Look Blue, which he shelved. The film follows Chiron (Alex R. Hibbert, Ashton Sanders, Trevante Rhodes), a young Black man who grapples with his identity and sexuality while experiencing the everyday struggles of childhood, adolescence, and burgeoning adulthood in Miami. The film was critically acclaimed, and McCraney and Jenkins won the Academy Award for Best Adapted Screenplay.

On September 25, 2017, Walt Disney Studios acquired McCraney's screenplay Cyrano the Moor, a musical adaptation of Cyrano de Bergerac and Othello, with David Oyelowo attached to star in and produce the film.

McCraney wrote the screenplay for the 2019 American sports drama, High Flying Bird, directed by Steven Soderbergh and released by Netflix. The film follows sports agent Ray Burke (André Holland) who finds himself caught between a league and its basketball players. The script is based on the 2011 NBA lockout.

=== Television ===
McCraney wrote and was an executive producer of the original scripted TV series, David Makes Man, for Oprah Winfrey's OWN Network. It ran for two seasons.

== Personal life ==
McCraney is gay.

== Works ==
=== Plays ===
- Without/Sin (2005)
- The Breach (2006)
- Wig Out! (2008) (developed at Sundance Theatre Lab, produced in New York by the Vineyard Theatre and in London by the Royal Court)
- Run, Mourner, Run (2010) (adapted from Randall Kenan's short story) (Yale Cabaret)
- American Trade (2011) (Royal Shakespeare Company)
- Choir Boy (2012) (Royal Court, Manhattan Theatre Club, Samuel J. Friedman Theatre, Steppenwolf Theatre)
- Head of Passes (2013) (Steppenwolf Theatre, Berkeley Rep, The Public Theater)
- Antony and Cleopatra (2013) (adaptation)
- Ms. Blakk for President (2019) (Steppenwolf Theatre)
- We Are Gathered (2025)
- Windfall (2026)

==== The Brother/Sister Plays trilogy ====
- The Brothers Size (2007) (simultaneously premiered in New York at The Public Theater, in association with the Foundry Theatre, and in London at the Young Vic, where it was nominated for an Olivier Award for Outstanding Achievement at an Affiliated Theatre)
- In The Red and Brown Water (2008) (winner of the Kendeda Graduate Playwriting Competition, produced at the Alliance Theatre and the Young Vic)
- Marcus, or the Secret of Sweet (2009)

=== Film and television ===
- Moonlight (2016) (story by), based on McCraney's unpublished autobiographical drama school project In Moonlight Black Boys Look Blue
- High Flying Bird (2019)
- David Makes Man (2019–2021)

== Awards and honors ==
- 2007 Whiting Award
- 2007 Paula Vogel Playwriting Award for The Brothers Size
- 2008 London's Evening Standard Award for Most Promising Playwright
- 2009 New York Times Outstanding Playwright Award for The Brothers Size
- 2009 Steinberg Playwright Award
- 2013 Windham–Campbell Literature Prize
- 2013 MacArthur Fellowship
- 2014 Doris Duke Performing Artist Award
- 2017 Academy Award for Best Adapted Screenplay: Moonlight
- 2017 PEN/Laura Pels International Foundation for Theater Awards American Playwright in Mid-Career
- 2017 United States Artists Fellowship
- 2019 40 Under 40 List by Connecticut Magazine

== See also ==
- List of LGBTQ Academy Award winners and nominees
- List of black Academy Award winners and nominees
