= Qaraçuxur =

- Municipality
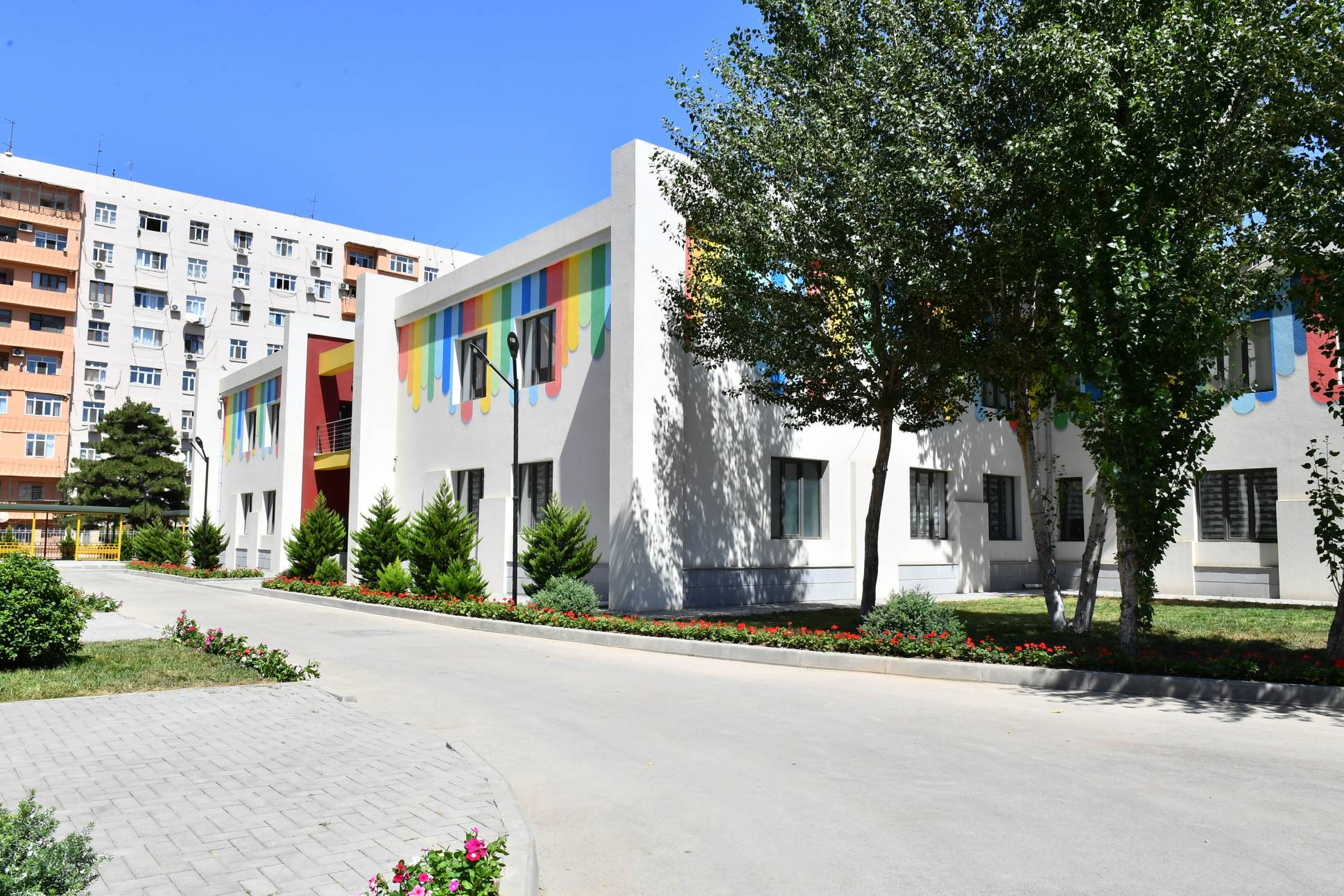
- The Kindergarten in Garachukhur

- Location within Azerbaijan
- Coordinates: 40°23′48″N 49°58′25″E
- Country: Azerbaijan
- City: Baku
- District: Suraxanı-Surakhani

Population (2008)
  - Total: 87,349
- Time zone: UTC+4 (AZT)
  - Summer (DST): UTC+5 (AZT)

Qaraçuxur (also spelled as, Gharachukhur, Imeni Kaganovicha, Kaganovich, Kaganovicha, Karachekhur, Karachukhur, Posëlok Imeni Kaganovicha, Serebovski, and Serebrovskiy) is a settlement and municipality in Baku, Azerbaijan. It has a population of 87,349. The municipality consists of the settlements of Qaraçuxur.

There are 7 secondary schools, 1 gymnasium, 1 dental polyclinic, 1 medical unit and 1 hospital in the settlement.

== Transportation ==
The Karachukhur Metro Station Y-20 in

- Green line
- Purple line
  B-12 are planned in this area by Baku Metro in the future.

== Notable natives ==
- Namig Garachukhurlu (born 1978), singer-songwriter, meykhana, performer

== Gallery ==
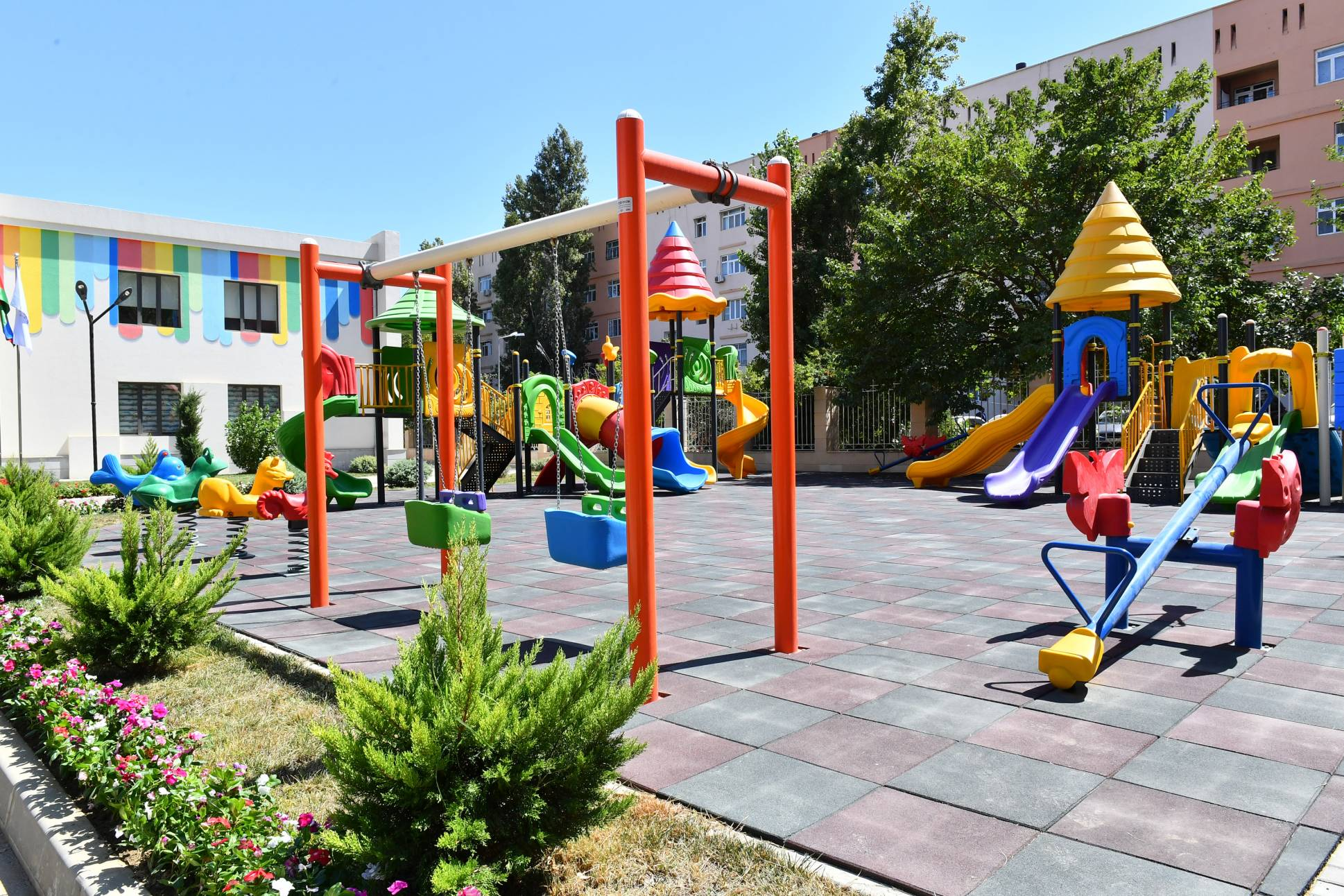

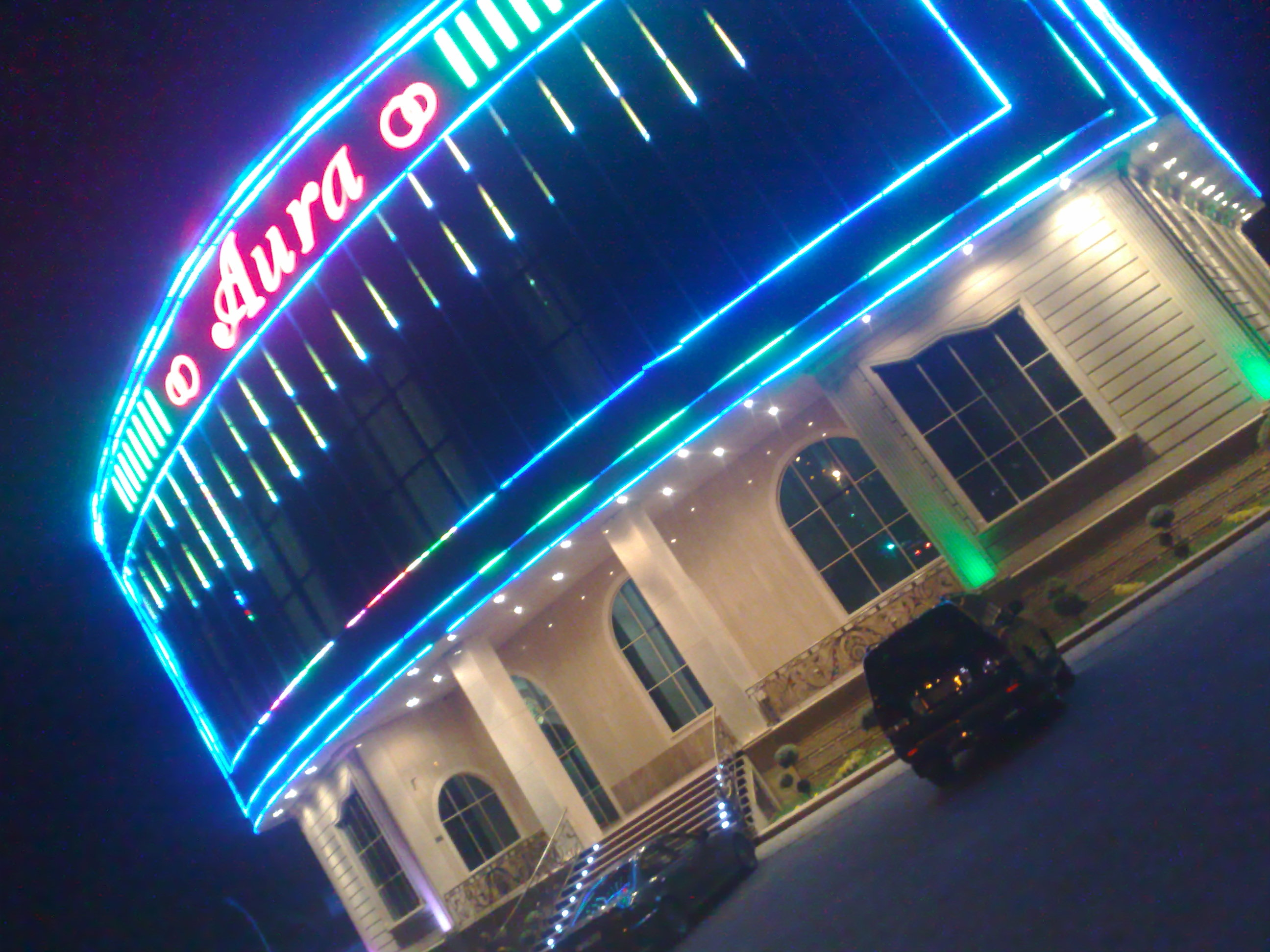

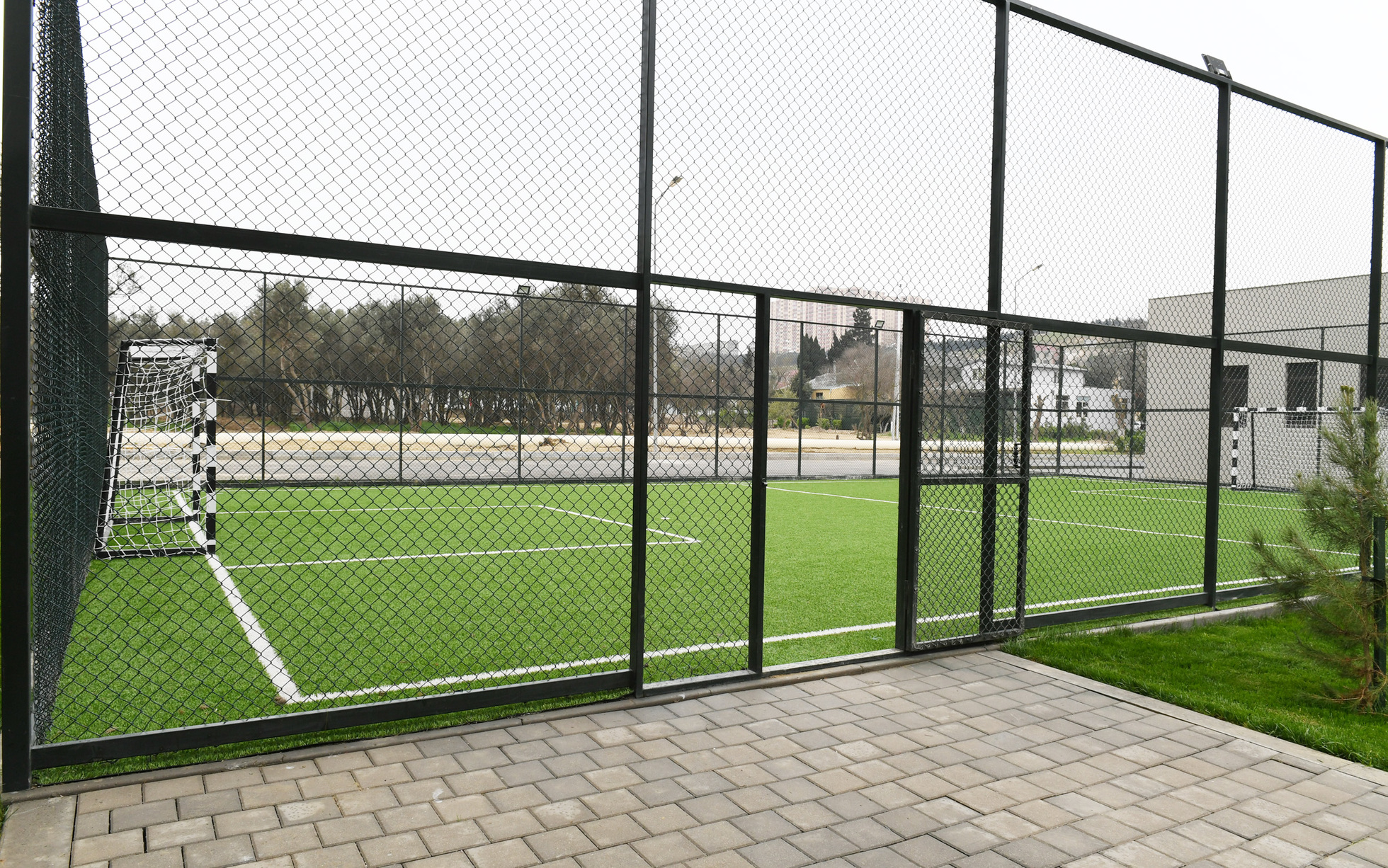

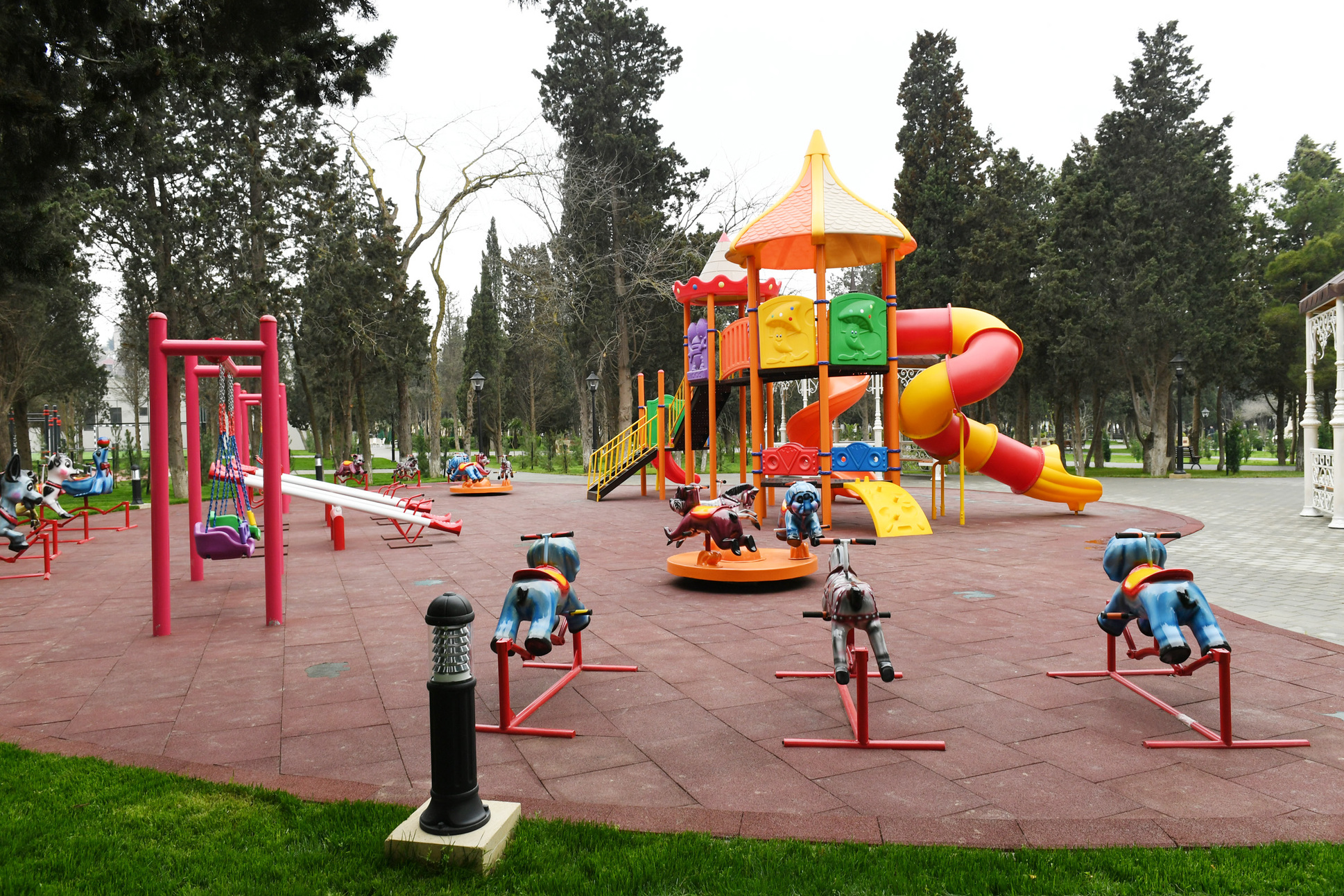

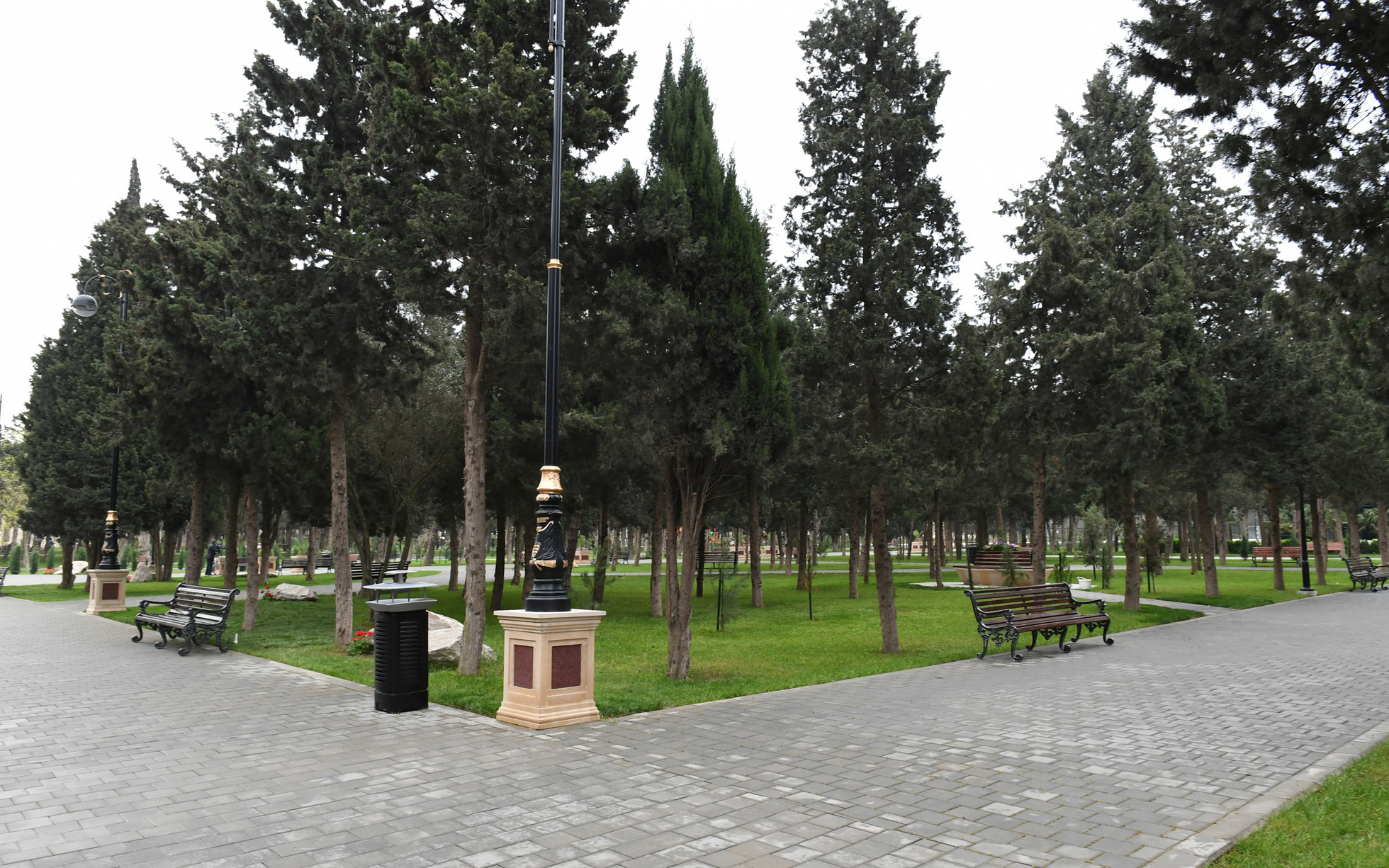

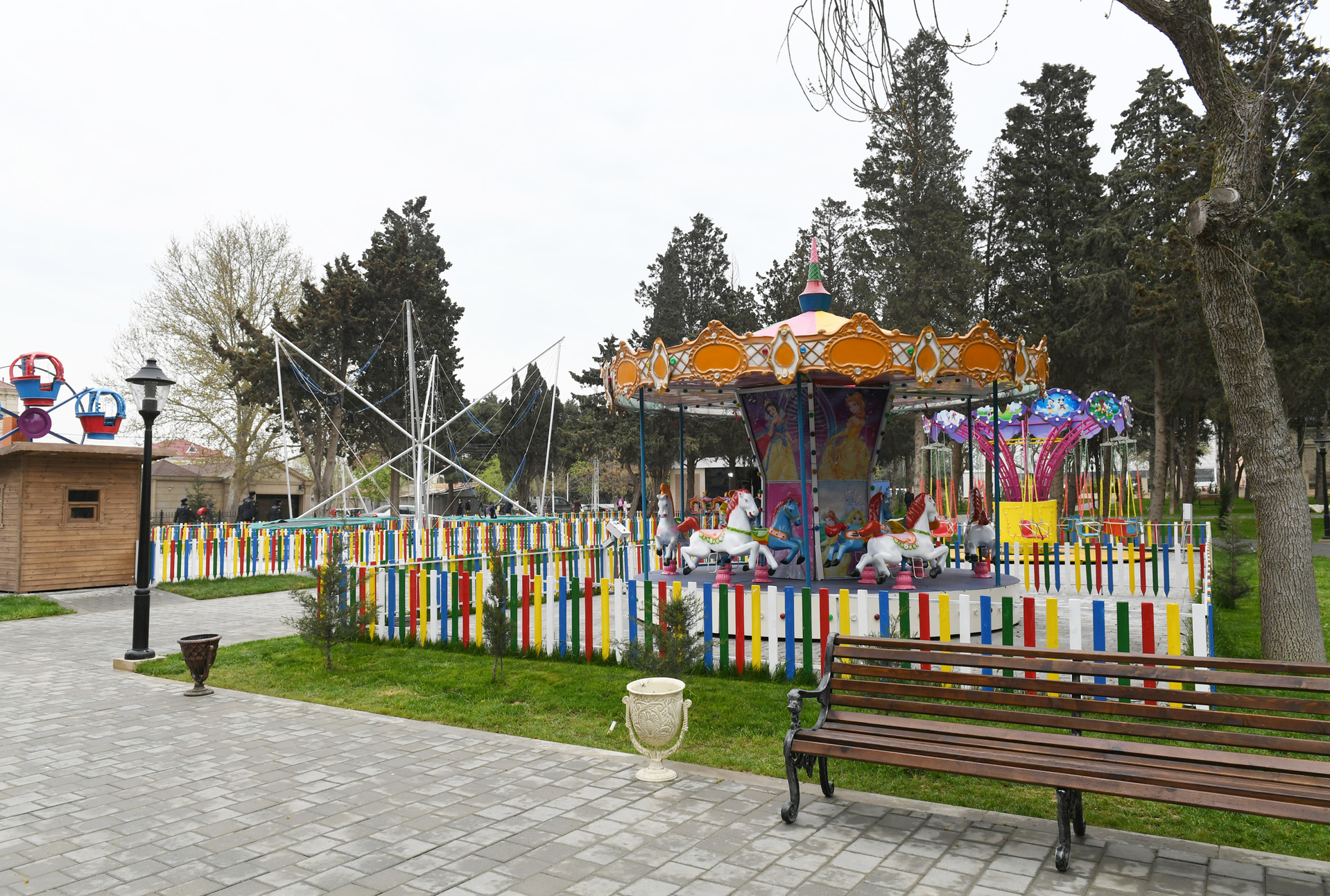
