= Hannah Doran =

Anglo-Irish playwright

- Occupation: Playwright
- Notable work: The Meat Kings! (Inc.) of Brooklyn Heights
- Awards: 2026 Susan Smith Blackburn Prize

Hannah Doran is a playwright, whose work The Meat Kings! (Inc) of Brooklyn Heights was the joint winner of the 2026 Susan Smith Blackburn Prize. She was also a nominee for 'Most Promising Playwright' in the 2026 Critics' Circle Theatre Awards and for Best Writer at the 2026 Stage Debut Awards. In 2024 the work won the Papatango New Writing Prize. A 2025 review of the work by The Guardian described it as "a vigorous first play, beautifully performed, alive and energetic, by a playwright of promise". Time Out reviewed it as "a solid play that grows in stature".

Doran attended Alton College, followed by an undergraduate degree at the University of Warwick and an MFA from the NYU Tisch School of the Arts. Following this she undertook a theatre internship whilst working at a butcher's shop in Brooklyn. Doran grew up between the UK and Ireland.
