= Bill Sims =

American blues musician (1949–2019)

- Born: June 23, 1949; Marion, Ohio, United States
- Died: February 2, 2019 (aged 69)
- Genres: Blues
- Occupation: Musician

Bill Sims Jr. (June 23, 1949 – February 2, 2019) was an American blues musician.

== Early life ==
He was born and grew up in Marion, Ohio, United States, and began playing piano at the age of four. At age 14, he turned professional and joined the rhythm and blues band the Jacksonian Blues, which he left to attend Ohio State University.

In 1971, Sims joined another rhythm and blues group, the doo-wop-influenced Four Mints. He left the band in 1976 to form the Lamorians, an avant-garde jazz band influenced by traditional African drumming. In 1988, he returned to the blues, founding Bill Sims and the Cold Blooded Blues Band. He released his debut album, Blues Before Sunrise, in 1992, and in 1999, PBS did a 10-hour documentary on Sims and his interracial family (with Sims's partner Karen Wilson). Sims released another album to coincide with this broadcast.

Bill Sims Jr. died on February 2, 2019, at the age of 69.

== Discography ==
- Blues Before Sunrise (1992)
- Bill Sims (1999)
- Bill on Bob (2016)
