= Mostar Youth Theatre 1974 =

Mostar Youth Theatre 1974. is an independent community theatre group in Mostar, Bosnia and Herzegovina. It was founded by Sead Dulic in 2011 and is the offshoot of city-owned Mostar Youth Theatre. It was formed after the City of Mostar raised charges against former Mostar Youth Theatre director, Sead Dulic, and resolved him of his directorial duties.

In 2011 Sead Dulic, along with several actors and employees, formed Mostar Youth Theatre 1974 which continued producing plays, touring shows, and holding theatre workshops.

== See also ==
- Mostar Youth Theatre
- Architecture of Mostar
