= Perth Youth Theatre =

Holiday school theatre company in Perth, Australia

The Perth Youth Theatre is a holiday school for kids in Perth, Western Australia. They have put on performances at many different theatres in Perth putting on shows every school holidays

== Musicals ==
A class teaching Musical Theatre Skills with performances such as:

- Joseph and the Amazing Technicolor Dreamcoat
- Grease
- Chicago
- Horror - A mix of different horror items
- Harry Potter and the Philosopher's Stone

== Dance ==
A class for experienced dancers performing:

- A Chorus Line
- Cats

== Drama ==
A class with no singing or dancing.

- Things that go Bump in the Night
- Bugsy Malone

== Mini Kids ==
A class for those between 2 and 9 years old mainly performing mega mix dance routines.

- Grease Megamix
- Horror Megamix
