= Mostar Youth Theatre =

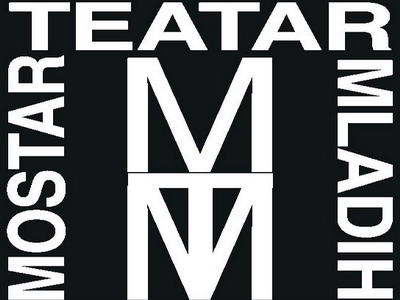
- Mostar Youth Theatre Logo
- Interactive map of Mostar Youth Theatre
- Address: Trg Republike 1 Mostar; Bosnia and Herzegovina
- Coordinates: 43°20′38″N 17°48′40″E
- Owner: The City of Mostar
- Designation: Public Institution

Construction
- Opened: February 24, 1974
- Architect: Miroslav Lose

Website
- mostm.weebly.com

Mostar Youth Theatre (locally known as Mostarski Teatar Mladih or MTM) is a city-sponsored community theatre located in Mostar, Bosnia and Herzegovina.

== History ==
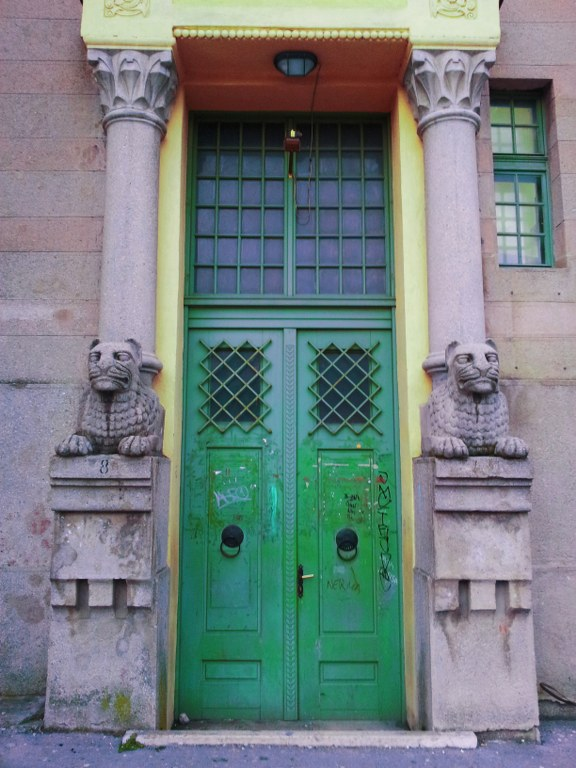
City Bath in Mostar, Entrance

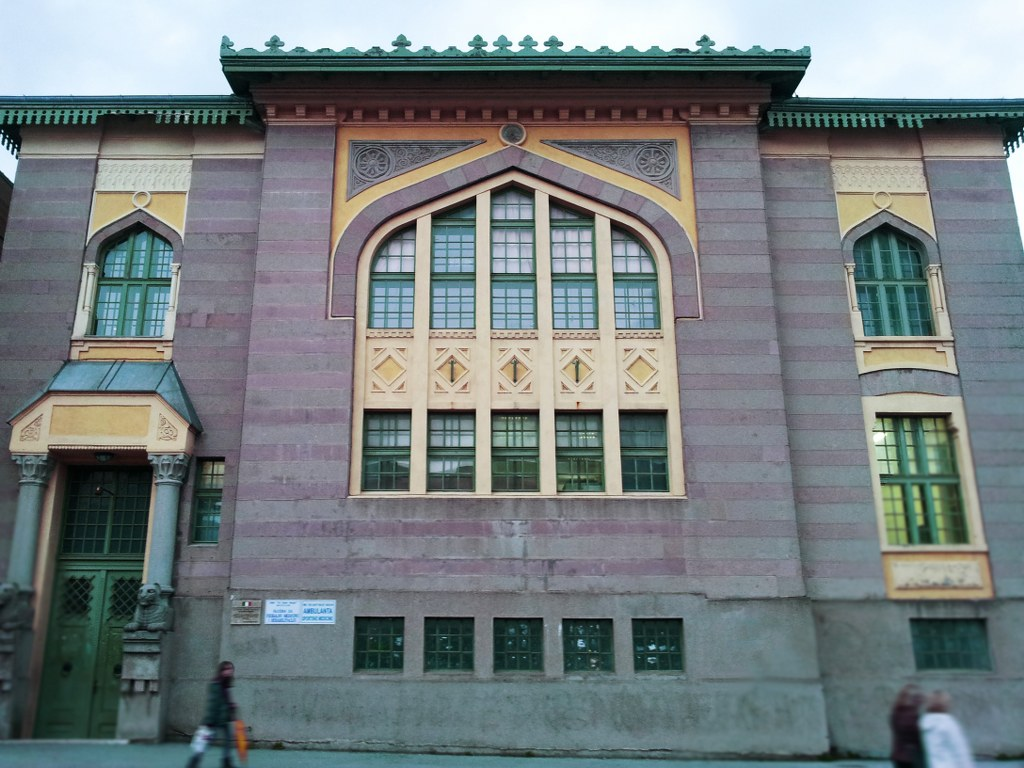
City Bath in Mostar

Theatre was founded on February 24, 1974. The work of MTM includes a practical drama education for children and young people as well as production of theatre shows.

MTM offers its members training in acting, improvisation, acting games, physical theatre, movement, voice, pantomime, dance, masks, and various styles of acting. Theatre is divided into following subdivisions: a children's drama studio, youth drama group and the group for adults.

The Mostar Youth Theatre used to organize the “Days of Youth Theatre” IFAP (International Festival of Authorial Poetics), which also included the educational part called "Alternative Academy". However, this segment has been abandoned in 2012 and partially continued by a private theatre group called Mostar Youth Theatre 1974.

In addition, the Mostar Youth Theatre has founded an International award called the “Grozdanin Kikot” award. It is usually awarded to the five individuals or organizations who have made significant contributions to the development of drama education. The award organization was later taken over by the Centre for Drama Education (CDO) which was also initiated by the MTM.

Mostar Youth Theatre is one of the Mostar theaters with the largest number of productions and their headquarters are located in the City Bath building at Mostar's Musala Square.

== Controversy ==
On January 24, 2011, Izida Sakić was named a temporary director of the MTM while the former director and co-founder Sead Đulić underwent an investigation concerning financial mismanagement of the institution.

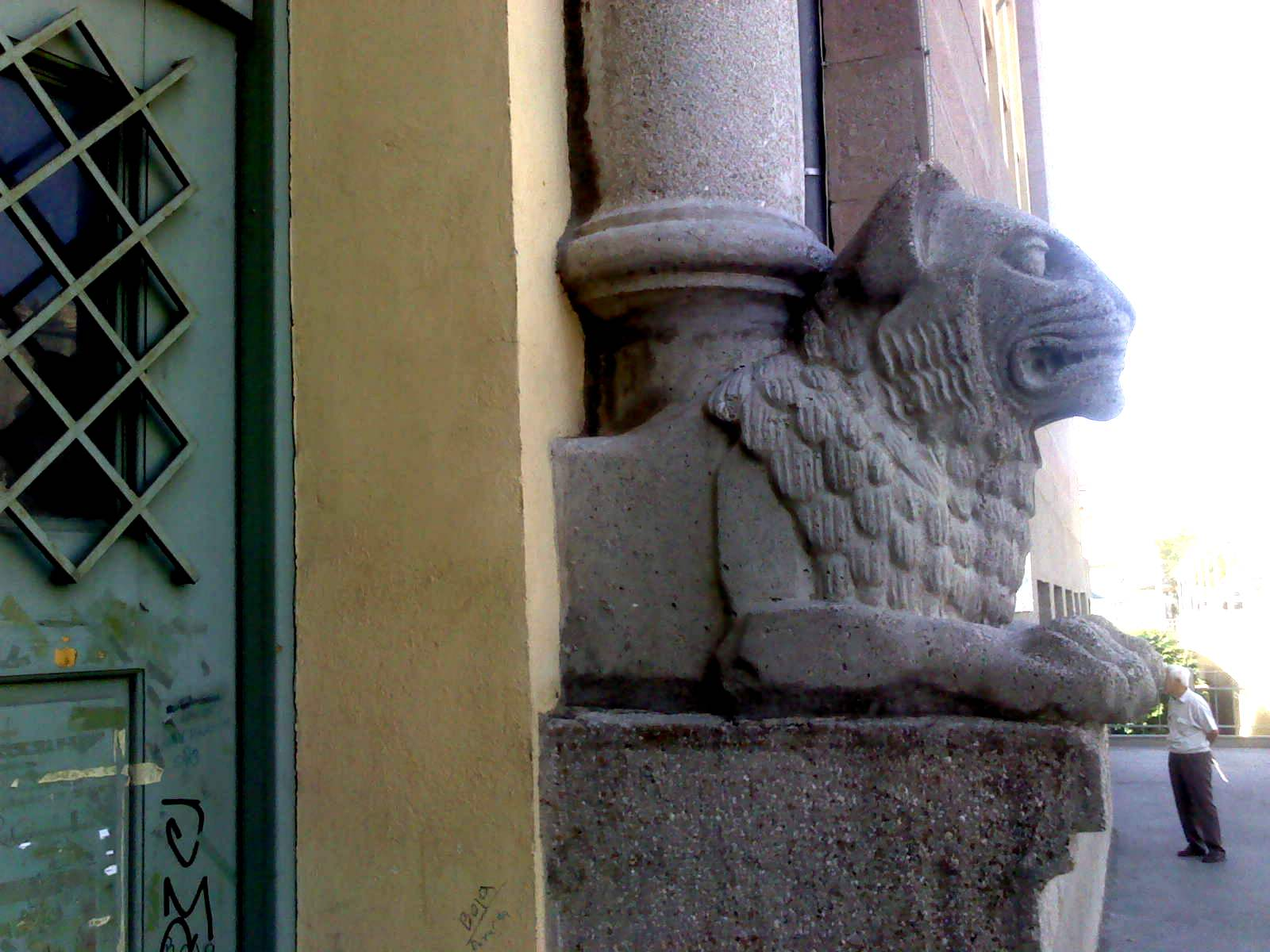
Mostar Youth Theatre Entrance

Sead Dulic accused the City of Mostar of not granting sufficient funds for MTM's management while the City of Mostar claimed that in 2005 MTM independently chose to become a city-sponsored institution and that their funds were misused.

This has resulted in unpaid late tax fees which amounted to around 50.000 BAM. City of Mostar also claimed that Đulic served as a director illegally since he never underwent official selection process and because he lacks necessary professional qualifications. In addition to this, the city also accused a former director of submitting false financial reports as well as illegally transferring MTM funds to the accounts of Centre for Drama Education whose president is also Sead Dulic.

In response to these accusations Sead Đulić, along with several former members of the theatre, formed a new company called Mostar Youth Theatre 1974 which continued producing and touring shows.

Dr. Tanja Miletić Oručević was appointed a Mostar Youth Theatre director post in the summer of 2012.

== See also ==
- Mostar Youth Theatre 1974
- Architecture of Mostar
