= Foundry Theatre =

Theatre in Sydney, Australia

- Interactive map of Foundry Theatre
- Address: 55 Pirrama Road, Pyrmont; Sydney; Australia
- Coordinates: 33.8685°S 151.1961°E
- Owner: Foundation Theatres
- Capacity: 360 seats (630 standing)
- Type: Theatre
- Public transit: The Star Light Rail

Construction
- Opened: 11 February 2025

Website
- www.foundrytheatre.com.au

The Foundry Theatre is a theatre and live entertainment venue, part of The Star complex in Sydney, Australia.

The 360-seat (or 630 standing) venue was formed through a repurposing of the Sydney Lyric's under-utilised rear dock. It opened in February 2025 with a limited season of performances by Tim Minchin, with his week-long run titled First at the Foundry. It is owned by Foundation Theatres, which also owns the Sydney Lyric.
