= Independent Youth Theatre =

Platform for youth performance in Ireland

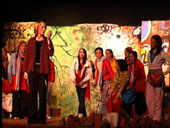
Youth Theatre performance

Independent Youth Theatre is a platform for youth performance in Ireland. Based in Dublin and established in 2003, the Independent Youth Theatre (or IYT) produces new Irish works which are directed and written by young people. It accepts members between the ages of 14 and 24 and is the only youth theatre in Ireland to be run by a democratically elected committee of youths. The group is a member of the National Association of Youth Drama (NAYD). The company has also taken part in the Dublin Fringe, and was a regular at the Everyman Palace Theatre's New Connections Festival, until its relocation to the Riverbank Arts Centre in Newbridge.

The group rehearses in The Basement Studio on Clarendon Street and performs at different venues in Dublin. In addition to touring youth theatre venues in Ireland, IYT hosts two youth theatre festivals each year, providing other youth theatres with an opportunity to perform in Dublin.
