= List of people with given name Mikhail =

This is a list of notable people with the given name Mikhail.

== People with name "Mikhail" ==
- Mikhail, Prince of Abkhazia, the head of state of the Principality of Abkhazia
- Mikhail of Vladimir, second and fourth Prince of Vladimir
- Mikhail Ageyev (1931–2005), Soviet and Russian scientist
- Mikhail Alexandrovich (1914–2002), Russian Empire-born, Soviet-Latvian Jewish tenor and cantor
- Mikhail An (1952–1979), Soviet]] football player
- Mikhail Nikolaevich Artemenkov [1978) Soviet Union-born, Russian historian and teacher
- Mikhail Bakhtin (1895–1975), Russian philosopher
- Mikhail Bakunin (1814–1876), Russian Empire, founder of Collectivist Anarchism
- Mikhail Barsukov (born 1947), Soviet Union-born, former head of the Russian FSB
- Mikhail Baryshnikov (born 1948), Soviet Union-born, Latvian-Russian-American ballet dancer, choreographer, and actor
- Mikhail Botvinnik (1911–1995), Russian Empire-born, Soviet Union/Russian Federation Chess Grandmaster and World Chess Champion
- Mikhail Boyarsky (born 1949), Soviet actor and singer
- Mikhail Bulgakov (1891–1940), Russian Empire-born, Soviet writer and medical doctor
- Mikhail M. Diakonoff (1907–1954), Soviet orientalist
- Mikhail Farikh (1959–2016), Soviet Union-born, Russian private helicopter pilot
- Mikhail Fiksel (born 1980), Soviet Union-born, Russian-American sound designer
- Mikhail Fradkov (born 1950), Soviet Union-born, former Prime Minister of Russia
- Mikhail Fridman (born 1964), Soviet Union-born, Russian oligarch
- Mikhail Frinovsky (1898–1940), deputy head of NKVD and Great Purge perpetrator
- Mikhail Frunze (1885–1925), Bolshevik leader during and just prior to the Russian Revolution of 1917
- Mikhail Gorbachev (1931–2022), last leader of the Soviet Union (USSR)
- Mikhail Grabovski (born 1984), Soviet Union-bornBelarusian former ice hockey centre
- Mikhail Iakovlev (born 2000), Israeli racing cyclist
- Mikhail Illarionovich Kutuzov (1745–1813), Russian Empire field marshal
- Mikhail Kalashnikov (1919–2013), creator of AK 47 and other Kalashnikov firearms
- Mikhail Kalinin (1875–1946), first chairman of the Presidium of the Supreme Soviet
- Mikhail Kamkin (born 1985), Soviet Union-born, Russian professional footballer
- Mikhail Kasyanov (born 1957), former Prime Minister of Russia
- Mikhail Khabarov (born 1971), Soviet Union-born, Russian businessman and manager
- Mikhail Khergiani (1932–1969), Soviet Union-born, Georgian mountaineer
- Mikhail Khodorkovsky (born 1963), Soviet Union-born, former Russian oligarch
- Mikhail Khorobrit, Eleventh Prince of Vladimir
- Mikhail Khudyakov (1894–1936), Russian Empire-born, Soviet archaeologist
- Mikhail Kissine (born 1980), Soviet Union-born, Belgian linguist
- Mikhail Kolyada (born 1995), Russian figure skater and Olympic Silver Medal winner
- Mikhail Kuklev (born 1982), Soviet Union-born, Russian professional ice hockey defenceman
- Mikhail Kutuzov (1745–1813), Field Marshal of the Russian Empire
- Mikhail Kuzovlev (born 1966), Soviet Union-born, Russian banker and financer
- Mikhail Lermontov (1814–1841), Russian Empire poet
- Mikhail Lomonosov (1711–1765), Russian Empire polymath
- Mikhail Makarov (1962–1988), Soviet serial killer known as The Executioner
- Mikhail Malkin (born 1996), Azerbaijani trampolinist
- Mikhail Mishustin (born 1966), Soviet Union-born, current prime minister of Russia
- Mikhail Mizintsev (born 1962), Soviet Union-born, Russian colonel general currently serving as head of the National Defense Management Center of Russia and war criminal known as the "Butcher of Mariupol"
- Mikhail Mokretsov (born 1961), Soviet Union-born, former director of the Russian Federal Taxation Service
- Mikhail Murashko (born 1967), Soviet Union-born, current Minister of Health of the Russian Federation
- Mikhail Naimy (1889–1988), Lebanese and American writer
- Mikhail Novosyolov, Soviet-Tajik serial killer
- Mikhail Perez (born 1990), former international soccer player for the Dominican Republic
- Mikhail Pletnev (born 1957), Soviet Union-born, Russian pianist, conductor and composer
- Mikhail Plyatskovsky (1935–1991), Soviet screenwriter and poet
- Mikhail Pokrovsky (1868–1932), Russian Empire historian
- Mikhail Popkov (born 1964), Soviet Union-born, Russian serial killer and rapist
- Mikhail Prokhorov (born 1965), Soviet Union-born, Russian oligarch
- Mikhail Romanov (1596–1645), Tsardom of Russia, first Romanov Tsar of all Russia
- Mikhail Sagin (born 1962), Soviet Union-born, former Russian footballer
- Mikhail Saltykov-Shchedrin (1826–1889), 19th century Russian Empire writer and satirist
- Mikhail Sergachev (born 1998), NHL player for the Tampa Bay Lightning team
- Mikhail Shaidorov (born 2004), Kazakh figure skater
- Mikhail Shchadov (1927–2011), Soviet Union-born, Russian engineer and politician
- Mikhail Sholokov (1905–1984), Soviet writer and winner of the 1965 Nobel Prize in Literature
- Mikhail Shufutinsky (born 1948), Soviet Union-born, Russian pop singer
- Mikhail Yuryevich Simonov (1959), Soviet Union-born, Russian direct marketing pioneer
- Mikhail Skobelev (1843–1882), Russian Empire general known for his conquest of Central Asia
- Mikhail Solomentsev (1913–2008), Russian Empire-born, Soviet politician
- Mikhail Sovetlyanov (born 1987), Soviet Union-born, Russian professional footballer
- Mikhail Speransky (1772–1839), Russian Empire reformer
- Mikhail Spokoyny (born 1955), Soviet Union-born, Ukrainian scientist
- Mikhail Stroganov (born 1968), Soviet Union-born, Russian football player
- Mikhail Studenetsky (1934–2021), Soviet basketball player and Olympic Silver Medal winner
- Mikhail L. Surguchev (1928–1991), USSR petroleum scientist
- Mikhail Suslov (1902–1982), Russian Empire, Russian statesman
- Mikhail Svetov (politician) (1985), Soviet Union-born, Russian politician and chairman of the "Civil Society" movement
- Mikhail Tal (1936–1992), Soviet chess grandmaster and World Chess Champion
- Mikhail Trepashkin (1957), Soviet Union-born, former Russian FSB officer who conducted independent review of Russian Apartment Bombings
- Mikhail Trilisser (1883–1940), Russian Empire-born, Soviet intelligence officer
- Mikhail Trinoga (born 1949), Soviet Union-born, current adviser to the President of Russia
- Mikhail Tsvet (1872–1919), Russian Empire-born, inventor of chromatography
- Mikhail Tsvetkov (born 1980), Soviet Union-born, Russian high jumper
- Mikhail Tukhachevsky (1893–1937), Russian Empire-born, Soviet general who led the post-revolution Soviet campaign against Poland
- Mikhail Tyurin (born 1960), Soviet Union-born, Russian cosmonaut
- Mikhail Ustyantsev (born 1992), Russian ice hockey player
- Mikhail Varshavski (born 1989), D.O., Russian-born American internet celebrity and family medicine physician
- Mikhail Vladimirsky (1874–1951), temporary chairman of the All-Russian Central Executive Committee
- Mikhail Yaroslavich, 21st Prince of Vladimir and Orthodox saint
- Mikhail Yasnov (1906–1991), chairman of the Presidium of the Supreme Soviet of the RSFSR
- Mikhail Yevseyev (born 1973), Soviet Union-born, Russian footballer
- Mikhail Yudin (footballer) (1976–2020), Soviet Union-born,footballer in the Russian Football National League
- Mikhail Yudin (serial killer) (1975), Soviet Union-born, Russian serial killer known as The Berdsk Maniac
- Mikhail Yuryev (1959–2019), Soviet Union-born, Russian politician who served as a member of the State Duma between 1996 and 1999
- Mikhail Nikolayevich Zadornov (1948–2017), Soviet Union-born, Russian stand-up comedian and writer
- Mikhail Mikhailovich Zadornov (born 1963), Soviet Union-born, former First Deputy Prime Minister of Russia
- Mikhail Zurabov (born 1953), Soviet Union-born, former Minister of Health of the Russian Federation

== Variants ==
=== Mikail ===
- Mikail Al (born 2003), Turkish Paralympian athlete

=== Mikhael ===
- Mikhael Gromov, Russian-French mathematician known for his work in the field of geometry
- Mikhael Jaimez-Ruiz, Venezuelan footballer
- Mikhael Mirilashvili, Russian oligarch
- Mikhael Subotzky, South African artist

=== Mikheil ===
- Mikheil Saakashvili, third president of Georgia

=== Mikyle ===
- Mikyle Louis, Kittitian cricketer
- MiKyle McIntosh, Canadian basketball player
- Mikyle Rafiq, American streamer and YouTuber better known as N3on
