= Barrymore Award for Outstanding Direction of a Play =

Annual American theater award

- Awarded for: Excellence in Theatre
- Location: Philadelphia, PA
- Presented by: Theatre Philadelphia
- Currently held by: Amina Robinson for Intimate Apparel (2025)
- Website: theatrephiladelphia.org

The Barrymore Award for Outstanding Direction of a Play is an annual award given to the best director of a (non-musical) play running in the Greater Philadelphia, as determined by Theatre Philadelphia.

Blanka Zizka, the Founding Artistic Director of Wilma Theater has won the most awards, with five wins out of thirteen nominations. Additionally, Anne Kauffman, James Ijames, Terrence J. Nolen, Abigail Adams, Matt Pfeiffer, and James J. Christy each have two wins.

== Award winners ==
Key

and bold indicates the winner.

=== 1990s ===
Year	Director	Production	Ref.
1995
1995	**Blanka Zizka**	**Road**	
1995	**Mary B. Robinson**	**Of Mice and Men**	
1995	Deborah Block	Jeffrey	
1995	Leonard Foglia	Master Class	
1995	David Ingram	Distant Fires	
1996
1996	**Charles Karchmer**	**Love! Valour! Compassion!**	
1996	Abigail Adams	My Mother Said I Never Should	
1996	Dugald MacArthur	The Lower Depths	
1996	Ken Marini	Kindertransport	
1996	Mary B. Robinson	Three Viewings	
1997
1997	**James J. Christy & Harriet Power**	**Angels in America**	
1997	Ken Marini	The Illusion	
1997	Terrence J. Nolen	Death of a Salesman	
1997	William Roudebush	Oleanna	
1997	Blanka Zizka	Quills	
1998
1998	**Aaron Posner**	**A Midsummer Night's Dream**	
1998	Keith Baker	The Balkan Women	
1998	Dugald MacArthur	The Steward of Christendom	
1998	Ken Marini	Jack and Jill	
1998	Harriet Power	A Moon for the Misbegotten	
1999
1999	**Seth Rozin**	**Lebensraum**	
1999	James J. Christy	Coyote on a Fence	
1999	James J. Christy	Gross Indecency: The Three Trials of Oscar Wilde	
1999	Terrence J. Nolen	The Grapes of Wrath	
1999	Tazewell Thompson	A Flea in Her Ear	

=== 2000s ===
Year	Director	Production	Ref.
2000
2000	**Blanka Zizka**	**The Invention of Love**	
2000	James J. Christy	Side Man	
2000	Ken Marini	Dimly Perceived Threats To The System	
2000	Maria Mileaf	Wit	
2000	Terrence J. Nolen	Red Herring	
2001
2001	**James J. Christy**	**The Laramie Project**	
2001	Abigail Adams	Book of Days	
2001	Melia Bensussen	Hearts: The Forward Observer	
2001	Harriet Power	Measure for Measure	
2001	Seth Rozin	It's All True	
2002
2002	**William Roudebush**	**Equus**	
2002	Keith Baker	The Dresser	
2002	James J. Christy	The Merchant of Venice	
2002	Dan Rothenberg	Measure for Measure	
2002	Blanka Zizka	Yellowman	
2003
2003	**Abigail Adams**	**In the Blood**	
2003	Terrence J. Nolen	All My Sons	
2003	Blanka Zizka	The Magic Fire	
2003	Blanka Zizka	Red	
2003	Jiri Zizka	Big Love	
2004
2004	**Blanka Zizka**	**Jesus Hopped the 'A' Train**	
2004	Michael Brophy	Travels With My Aunt	
2004	Charles McMahon	The Comedy of Errors	
2004	Aaron Posner	Mary's Wedding	
2004	William Roudebush	A Christmas Carol	
2005
2005	**Maria Mileaf**	**The Story**	
2005	James J. Christy	Take Me Out	
2005	Daniel Fish	The Clean House	
2005	Pete Pryor	Recent Tragic Events	
2005	Jiri Zizka	Outrage	
2006
2006	**Terrence J. Nolen**	**Opus**	
2006	Joe Canuso	Killer Joe	
2006	Ken Marini	Man from Nebraska	
2006	Charles McMahon	Richard III	
2006	Matt Pfeiffer	The Foocy	
2007
2007	**Mark Clements**	**Of Mice and Men**	
2007	Terrence J. Nolen	A Prayer for Owen Meaney	
2007	David O'Connor	"Master Harold"...and the Boys	
2007	Matt Pfeiffer	Glengarry Glen Ross	
2007	Jiri Zizka	The Pillowman	
2008
2008	**Dan Kern**	**Skylight**	
2008	Whit MacLaughlin	Frozen	
2008	Ken Marini	Six Characters in Search of an Author	
2008	Matt Pfeiffer	Bug	
2008	Blanka Zizka	Eurydice	
2009
2009	**Terrence J. Nolen**	**Something Intangible**	
2009	Anne Marie Cammarato	No Child...	
2009	Kathryn MacMillan	The Hothouse	
2009	Blanka Zizka	Rock 'n' Roll	
2009	Blanka Zizka	Scorched	

=== 2010s ===
Year	Director	Production	Ref.
2010
2010	**Anne Kauffman**	**Becky Shaw**	
2010	Gabriel Quinn Bauriedel	Welcome to Yuba City	
2010	James J. Christy	Rabbit Hole	
2010	Walter Dallas	Blue Door	
2010	Madi Distefano	The Bald Soprano	
2011
2011	**Blanka Zizka**	**In the Next Room (or The Vibrator Play)**	
2011	Leonard Foglia	Let Me Down Easy	
2011	Richard Hamburger	My Wonderful Day	
2011	Matt Pfeiffer	The Lieutenant of Inishmore	
2011	Aaron Posner	Around the World in Eighty Days	
2012
2012	**Anne Kauffman**	**Body Awareness**	
2012	James J. Christy	The Outgoing Tide	
2012	Matt Pfeiffer	The Whipping Man	
2012	Sanford Robbins	The Skin of Our Teeth	
2012	Dan Rothenberg	Twelfth Night	
2012	Blanka Zizka	Angels in America	
2013	No award given		
2014
2014	**James Ijames**	**The Brothers Size**	
2014	Samantha Reading	Pride and Prejudice	
2014	Damon Bonetti	True Story	
2014	Joe Canuso	Anapurna	
2014	Matthew Decker	Circle Mirror Transformation	
2014	Kathryn MacMillan	I Am My Own Wife	
2014	Matt Pfeiffer	Down Past Passyunk	
2015
2015	**Matt Pfeiffer**	**The Whale**	
2015	Joe Canuso	Who's Afraid of Virginia Woolf?	
2015	Matt Pfeiffer	To The Moon	
2015	Joanna Settle	Rapture, Blister, Burn	
2015	Rick Shiomi	Caught	
2015	Pirronne Yousefzadeh	Dangerous House	
2015	Pirronne Yousefzadeh	In the Blood	
2016
2016	**Matt Pfeiffer**	**The Invisible Hand**	
2016	Deborah Block	Smoke	
2016	James J. Christy Sr.	A Great War	
2016	Kip Fagan	Exit Strategy	
2016	Claire Moyer	Spine	
2016	Kittson O'Neill	A Knee That Can Bend	
2016	Tom Reing	The Radicalisation of Bradley Manning	
2017
2017	**Blanka Zizka**	**When the Rain Stops Falling**	
2017	Steve H. Broadnax III	The Mountaintop	
2017	Emmanuelle Delpech	The Legend of Georgia McBride	
2017	Brenna Geffers	Anna	
2017	Claire Moyer	Radiant Vermin	
2017	Aaron Posner	Stupid Fucking Bird	
2017	Lane Savadove	The Seagull	
2018
2018	**Abigail Adams**	**Morning's at Seven**	
2018	Steve H. Broadnax III	Skeleton Crew	
2018	Kathryn MacMillan	The Revolutionists	
2018	Ken Marini	Waiting for Godot	
2018	Alex Torra	Bienvenidos Blancos! or Welcome White People!	
2018	Rebecca Wright	The Gap	
2018	Rebecca Wright	The Wild Duck	
2019
2019	**James Ijames**	**Gem of the Ocean**	
2019	C. Ryanne Domingues	Morir Sonyando	
2019	Jerrell L. Henderson	UNTITLED	
2019	Maura Krause	Boycott Esther	
2019	Kathryn MacMillan	The Complete Works of Jane Austen, Abridged	
2019	Kittson O'Neill	Moby Dick	
2019	Rebecca Wright	Indecent	

=== 2020s ===
Year	Director	Production	Ref.
2020	No award given		
2021	No award given		
2022	No award given		
2023
2023	**Malika Oyetimein**	**Clyde's**	
2023	Zuhairah McGill	The Royale	
2023	Abigail Adams	Lettie	
2023	Megan Bellwoar	A View from the Bridge	
2023	Kathryn MacMillan	Jane Eyre	
2023	Cat Ramirez	Meet Murasaki Shikibu Followed by Book-Signing, and Other Things	
2024
2024	**Charlotte Northeast**	**Citrus Andronicus**	
2024	Amina Robinson	Fat Ham	
2024	Kathryn MacMillan	Lovesong	
2024	Terrence J. Nolen	The Lehman Trilogy	
2024	Molly Rosa Houlahan	Hurricane Diane	
2024	Bianca LaVerne Jones	Crumbs from the Table of Joy	
2024	Matt Pfeiffer	A Case for the Existence of God	
2025
2025	**Amina Robinson**	**Intimate Apparel**	
2025	Alex Burns	Cyrano de Bergerac	
2025	Morgan Green	The Comeuppance	
2025	Nell Bang-Jensen	Nosejob	
2025	James Ijames	King Hedley II	
2025	Kathryn MacMillan	Square Go	
2025	Matt Pfeiffer	Red	

== Multiple wins ==
5 wins

- Blanka Zizka

2 wins

- Anne Kauffman
- James Ijames
- Terrence J. Nolen
- Abigail Adams
- Matt Pfeiffer
- James J. Christy

== Multiple nominations ==
13 nominations

- Blanka Zizka

11 nominations

- Matt Pfeiffer

9 nominations

- James J. Christy

8 nominations

- Terrence J. Nolen

7 nominations

- Ken Marini
- Kathryn MacMillan

5 nominations

- Abigail Adams

4 nominations

- Aaron Posner

3 nominations

- Harriet Power
- Jiri Zizski
- Rebecca Wright
- James Ijames
- Joe Canuso

2 nominations

- Mary B. Robinson
- Deborah Block
- Leonard Foglia
- Charles McMahon
- Dugald MacArthur
- Seth Rozin
- Maria Mileaf
- Anne Kauffman
- Dan Rothenberg
- Pirronne Yousefzadeh
- Kittson O'Neill
- Steve H. Broadnax III
- Claire Moyer
- Amina Robinson
