= People Like Me =

People Like Me may refer to:

- People Like Me (album), or the title song, by Alyth, 2009
- People Like Me, an album by Rhett Akins, 2007
- "People Like Me", a song by Audio Adrenaline from Some Kind of Zombie, 1997
- "People Like Me" (song), by Hanoi Rocks, 2002
- "People Like Me", a song by K'naan from Troubadour, 2009
- "People Like Me", a song by King Combs and Kanye West from Never Stop, 2025
