= Nicole Muller =

Nicole Muller may refer to:

- Nicole Müller (linguist), Clinical and Celtic linguist
- Nicole Müller (gymnast, born 1994), German rhythmic gymnast, competed at the 2012 Summer Olympics
- Nicole Muller (gymnast, born 1989), Brazilian rhythmic gymnast, competed at the 2008 Summer Olympics
- Nicole Müller (footballer), German international association footballer
