= Beautiful Liar (disambiguation) =

"Beautiful Liar" is a 2007 song by Beyoncé and Shakira.

Beautiful Liar or The Beautiful Liar may also refer to:

- The Beautiful Liar (album), a 2021 studio album by American rock band X Ambassadors
  - "Beautiful Liar", a song from the album
- Beautiful Liar (EP), 2015 extended play by VIXX LR
- "Beautiful Liar" (Monsta X song), 2023
- The Beautiful Liar (film), a 1921 comedy film

== See also ==
- Beautiful Lies (disambiguation)
- The Beautiful Lie (disambiguation)
