= Heartbroken =

Heartbroken may refer to:

- Heartbroken (novel), a novel by Lisa Unger
- The Heartbroken, a Canadian indie rock band
- "Heartbroken" (T2 song), a 2007 single by T2
- "Heartbroken" (Diplo, Jessie Murph and Polo G song)
- "Heart Broken", an episode of American TV series Modern Family
- "Heartbroken", a song by Cathy Carr
- "Heartbroken", a song by Aaliyah from the album One in a Million
- "Heartbroken", a song by Blackbear from the album Anonymous

== See also ==
- Heartbreak (disambiguation)
