= Martin Ball (disambiguation) =

Martin Ball may refer to:

- Martin Ball (footballer), footballer, see List of Rochdale A.F.C. players (25–99 appearances)
- Martin J. Ball (born 1951), linguist
- Martin Ball (born 1964), actor
