= Biosemiotic Medicine: Healing in the World of Meaning =

Information
- Author: Farzad Goli
- Language: English

Biosemiotic Medicine: Healing in the World of Meaning is an edited academic volume on biosemiotics, psychosomatic medicine, and healthcare theory, edited by Farzad Goli and published by Springer in 2016. The book is among the earliest works to explicitly apply biosemiotic theory to medicineand healthcare, proposing that biological, psychological, social, and cultural dimensions of health can be understood through a common framework of signs, meaning, communication, and interpretation.

== Overview ==
The central thesis of the book is that health, illness, and healing are not solely biochemical processes but also involve the production, exchange, and interpretation of signs. Drawing on biosemiotics, psychosomatic medicine, systems theory, and medical humanities, the volume argues that therapeutic outcomes are influenced by meaning, expectations, narratives, symbols, rituals, and interpersonal communication in addition to physiological mechanisms. The volume presents biosemiotics as a transdisciplinary framework capable of integrating medicine, psychology, neuroscience, psychotherapy, and cultural studies through a common language of sign processes and meaning-making.

== Contents ==
The book contains contributions from scholars working in biosemiotics, psychosomatic medicine, systems theory, philosophy of medicine, and hypnosis research. Major themes include:

- Placebo and meaning responses
- Narrative medicine
- Health beliefs and anticipation
- Ritual and healing processes
- Hypnosis and therapeutic communication
- Health education and nocebo effects
- Medical practice within the semiosphere
- Cybersemiotics and transdisciplinary medicine

== Conceptual contributions ==
Among the original contributions presented in the volume are Farzad Goli's proposals concerning biosemiotic approaches to health and healing. Goli argues that health, illness, and therapeutic interventions should be understood within a unified biosemiotic framework rather than through exclusively material-reductionist models. The book introduces the concept of Biosemiotic Medicines, defined as symbolic formulations designed to work synergistically with clinical interventions by enhancing therapeutic communication, meaning responses, expectancy effects, and endogenous healing mechanisms, including placebo-related processes.The volume also presents the foundations of the Bioenergy-Based Health Improvement model, which conceptualizes health as a dynamic process emerging from continuous exchanges of information among physiological states, subjective experience, narratives, symbolic representations, expectations, and intentions.

== Main themes ==
A recurring theme throughout the volume is that living organisms are sign-interpreting systems. Within this framework, illness, treatment, communication, and recovery are viewed as semiotic processes that influence biological regulation and clinical outcomes.The book emphasizes concepts such as meaning response, embodiment, anticipation, psychosomatic regulation, narrative construction, therapeutic relationships, and the role of symbols and rituals in healthcare.

== Reception ==
A review published in the British Journal of General Practice described the volume as an example of a broader paradigm shift in biology and medicine and highlighted its attempt to overcome traditional mind–body dualism through a biosemiotic framework.

The book was subsequently reviewed in the American Journal of Clinical Hypnosis, where its relevance to hypnosis research, placebo studies, therapeutic communication, and meaning-centered approaches to healthcare was emphasized.

In ''Redefining Medicine from an Anticipatory Perspective'' (2018), Mihai Nadin cited ''Biosemiotic Medicine'' alongside Thure von Uexküll's work in psychosomatic medicine and Eugen Baer's ''Medical Semiotics'' as contributions to the development of semiotic approaches in medicine and healthcare.
