= Mihhail =

Mihhail is a given name, the Estonian transliteration of the Russian name Mikhail. Notable people with the given name include:

- Mihhail Bronštein (1923–2022), Estonian economist
- Mihhail Kolobov (born 2005), Estonian footballer
- Mihhail Korb (born 1980), Estonian politician
- Mihhail Kõlvart (born 1977), Estonian politician and sportsperson
- Mihhail Lotman (born 1952), Estonian literary scholar, semiotician, and politician
- Mihhail Rõtšagov (born 1967), Estonian chess player
- Mihhail Selevko (born 2002), Estonian figure skater
- Mihhail Stalnuhhin (born 1961), Estonian politician

== See also ==
- List of people with given name Mikhail
