= Mikhail Yudin =

Mikhail Yudin may refer to:

- Mikhail Yudin (footballer)
- Mikhail Yudin (serial killer)
