= Darkness, My Old Friend =

2011 novel by Lisa Unger

- Author: Lisa Unger
- Language: English
- Genre: Crime fiction, Thriller
- Published: August 2011
- Publisher: Crown Publishing
- Publication place: United States

Darkness, My Old Friend is a novel by bestselling author Lisa Unger. It is the second book set in The Hollows, and features Jones Cooper.

== Reception ==
Tim O'Connell of The Florida Times-Union wrote that the "plotting at times is as intricate as the mine shafts that undermine the town". Kirkus Reviews wrote that Unger "shows her usual deftness at intricate plotting and explores the mother-child relationship from multiple angles, but too often refers to back story from a previous novel without explanation." Publishers Weekly wrote: "As with Fragile, the secluded nature of the town easily lends itself to long-gestating secrets, which Unger handles much better in this follow-up that's as much about uncovering the past as it is about accepting the future."

== Awards and honors ==
Darkness, My Old Friend was a top book pick from both Family Circle Magazine and Washington Life Magazine.
