= Beautiful Lies =

Beautiful Lie(s) may refer to:

== Music ==
=== Albums ===
- Beautiful Lies (Sweethearts of the Rodeo album), 1996
- Beautiful Lies (Birdy album), 2016

=== Songs ===
- “Beautiful Lie”, a 2009 song by Jennifer Paige and Nick Carter
- "Beautiful Lies" (Jean Shepard song), 1955
- "Beautiful Lies" (Roberta Howett song), 2010
- "Beautiful Lies" (Yung Bleu and Kehlani song), 2021
- "Beautiful Lie", a single by Yoav
- "Beautiful Lies", a song by Jack Rhodes (1908–1968)
- "Beautiful Lies", a track from the 1994 eponymous album Wolfsbane
- "Beautiful Lies", a track on Budgie's 1996 album An Ecstasy of Fumbling – The Definitive Anthology
- "Beautiful Lie", a song from the 2007 Levinhurst album House by the Sea
- "Beautiful Lies", a 2009 single by B-Complex
- "Beautiful Lie", a 2012 song composed by Jung Jin-young
- "Beautiful Lie", a track on Ryan Leslie's 2012 album Les Is More
- "Beautiful Lie", a track on the 2016 soundtrack of Batman v Superman: Dawn of Justice
- "Beautiful Lie", a track from the 2016 album Chameleon by Måns Zelmerlöw
- "Beautiful Lies", a track from the 2016 album Lost in Forever by Beyond the Black
- "Beautiful Lie", a song from Nelson Freitas’s 2016 album Four
- "Beautiful Lie", a track from the 2017 album Only When We're Naked by Zak Abel
- "Beautiful Lie", a song from Minzy's 2017 album Minzy Work 01: "Uno"

== Other ==
- Beautiful Lies (film), a 2010 French film by Pierre Salvadori
- Beautiful Lies (novel), a 2006 novel by Lisa Unger

== See also ==
- Beautiful Lies You Could Live In, a 1971 album by Pearls Before Swine
- The Beautiful Lie (disambiguation)
- Beautiful Liar (disambiguation)
