= Alyth McCormack =

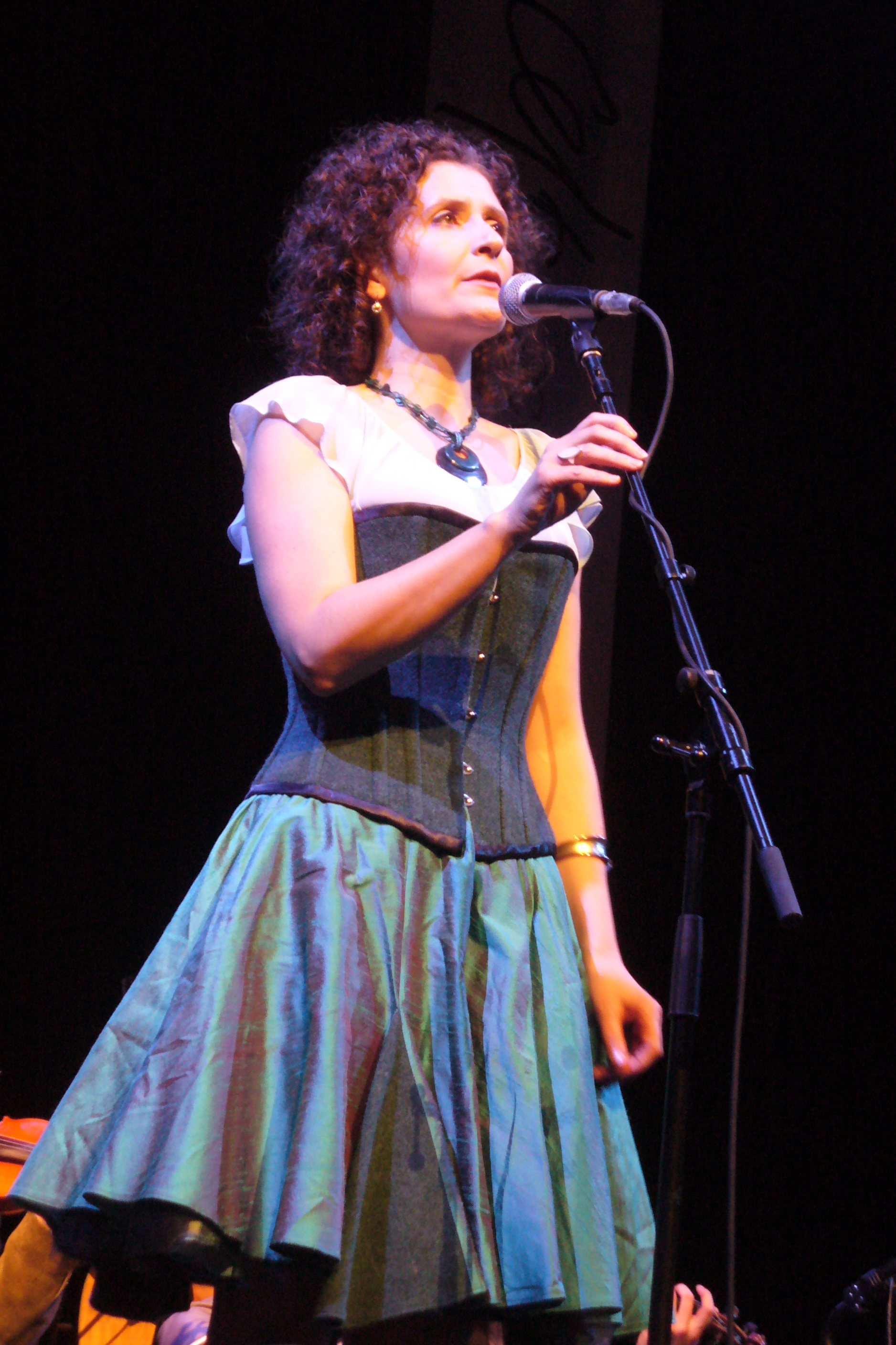
- Alyth McCormack in 2010

Background information
- Born: Alyth Catriona McCormack; 1970 (age 55–56); Isle of Lewis, Scotland
- Genres: Scottish Traditional; Celtic; Folk; Pop
- Occupations: Singer songwriter
- Years active: 2000–present
- Labels: Vertical Records; Navigator Records
- Website: Official site

Alyth Catriona McCormack (born 1970), also known mononymously as Alyth on some of her releases, is a Scottish singer and songwriter. She was brought up on the Isle of Lewis in the Scottish Outer Hebrides. In 2020 she has collaborated with the Art of Peace global project, composed and arranged by Mehran Alirezaei as vocalist.

== Biography ==
As a young child in the 1970s, McCormack was immersed in the culture of Hebridean Scotland. She went on to study classical singing and drama at the RSAMD in Glasgow. Since then, she has worked on a string of collaborations, with folk, jazz, classical and indie musicians.

During this time she recorded with various artists, appearing on over 16 albums between then and 2007, and in 2000 released her début solo album An Iomall (Scottish Gaelic: The Edge) on Vertical records.

In 2004, she began touring with On Eagles' Wings, and toured again in 2007. Throughout 2007 and 2008, she performed worldwide with The Chieftains, appearing at venues such Boston Symphony Hall and Carnegie Hall. She toured with Moving Hearts during their UK Tour in 2008, and appeared at the Liverpool Philharmonic.

She performed a concert for Sanctuary alongside Moya Brennan and Nóirín Ní Riain. She is a member of The Island Tapes, Shine and other bands. In 2009, she released her second solo album, People Like Me, which featured members of the Scottish band Lau.

McCormack married Irish musician Noel Eccles in Aberdeenshire in 2009. Her wedding dress was specially designed and made from Harris Tweed.

== Discography ==
=== Solo albums ===
- 2000 – An Iomall
- 2009 – People Like Me

=== Collaborations ===
- 2002 – Sugarcane with Shine
- 2004 – The Captain's Collection with The Captain's Collection
- 2005 – On Eagles Wing
- 2006 – Tha a laithean a’ dol seachad with Various Artists & Paul Mounsey
- 2008 – The Island Tapes with The Island Tapes
- 2007 – Sun Honey with Vertical Records artists
- 2006 – Persian Nights/Celtic Dawn with Savourna Stevenson
- 2008 – Dhachaigh (Home), The Murdo MacFarlane Songbook with Various artists
