= Martin J. Ball =

American academic

Martin Ball
- Born: 23 February 1951 (age 75); Tywyn, Wales
- Website: martinjball.weebly.com

Martin J. Ball FRCSLT FRSA FLSW is Honorary Professor in Linguistics at Bangor University in Wales. Until August 2017 he was Professor of Speech-Language Pathology (Clinical Linguistics and Phonetics) at Linköping University in Sweden. He holds joint Irish-UK-US citizenship. As of June 2019 he lives in Cork, Ireland.

== Early life ==
Martin J. Ball was born in Tywyn, Merionethshire, and lived in Llwyngwril until his family moved to England in the mid-1950s. He has one sibling, an older sister, Mary.

== Education ==
He attended Exeter School from 1963 to 1970. From 1970 to 1973 he was an undergraduate at the University College of North Wales (now Bangor University), obtaining a B.A. (Hons) in English and Linguistics. In 1976 he was awarded an M.A. in Phonetics and Linguistics from Essex University. In 1981 he received a certificate in Welsh as a second language from the University of Wales. He was an external doctoral student at University College Cardiff (now Cardiff University) from 1980 to 1984, and was awarded a PhD in 1985. In 2015 he was awarded the higher doctorate of D.Litt. by Bangor University for a thesis by publications in the area of clinical linguistics.

== Career ==
His first position was for one calendar year in 1977 as assistant lecturer in linguistics at the University of Al Fateh in Sebha, Libya. From 1978 to 1986 he was Senior Lecturer in Linguistics at the Cardiff School of Speech Therapy, South Glamorgan Institute of Higher Education (now Cardiff Metropolitan University). He was Senior Lecturer in Linguistics at the Polytechnic of Wales (now University of South Wales) from 1987 to 1991. In 1991 he was appointed to a position at Ulster University, being promoted to Reader in 1994, and Professor in 1997.

From August 2000 until the summer of 2014, he was Hawthorne-BORSF Endowed Professor II & IV and co-director of the Doris B Hawthorne Center for Special Education and Communicative Disorders in the Department of Communicative Disorders at the University of Louisiana at Lafayette. In 2014, he moved to Sweden to take up his recent position, which he left at the end of July 2017. He took up an honorary position at Bangor University, Wales, while residing in Cork, Ireland, where his wife Nicole Müller assumed the position of Professor of Speech and Hearing Sciences at University College Cork in February 2017. In 2022 he was appointed Visiting Professor at Wrexham University.

In 1987 he founded, and edited until the end of 2020, the journal of Clinical Linguistics and Phonetics and served as president of the International Clinical Phonetics and Linguistics Association (ICPLA) between 2000 and 2006. He is an honorary Fellow of the Royal College of Speech and Language Therapists (London), elected 2004. In 2014, he was elected a Fellow of the Learned Society of Wales.

Professor Ball has published widely in the areas of clinical linguistics and Celtic linguistics, including over 40 books, 64 book chapters, and over 100 journal articles.

He is a member of Plaid Cymru along with membership of Cymdeithas yr Iaith Cymraeg and Yes Cymru.

== Selected publications ==
- (2021) Ball, M. J. (ed.) Manual of Clinical Phonetics. London Routledge.
- (2019) Ball, M. J., Fletcher, P. and Crystal, D. (eds.) Grammatical Profiles: Further Languages of LARSP. Bristol: Multilingual Matters.
- (2016) Ball, M. J. Principles of clinical phonology. Theoretical approaches. New York: Psychology Press.
- (2016) Ball, M. J. and Müller, N. (eds.) Challenging sonority: Crosslinguistic evidence. Equinox Publishing (Sheffield).
- (2010) Ball, M. J., Müller, N. and Rutter, B. Phonology for communication disorders. Hove: Psychology Press.
