= Mikhail Kissine =

Belgian linguist (born 1980)

- Born: 1980 (age 45–46); Leningrad, USSR
- Education: Université libre de Bruxelles, Brussels; University of Cambridge, UK.
- Known for: Speech act, Linguistics, philosophy of language
- Scientific career
- Fields: Linguistics
- Workplaces: LaDisco: Centre of Research in Linguistics (director); ACTE (Autism in Context: Theory and Experiment); Université libre de Bruxelles (professor)

Mikhail Kissine (born in 1980 in Leningrad) is a Belgian linguist who specialises in cognitive pragmatics, clinical linguistics and philosophy of language. Professor of linguistics and director of the Centre of Research in Linguistics (LaDisco) in the Université libre de Bruxelles (ULB), Kissine is focusing his research on the language and the cognition in the context of the Autistic Spectrum disorder(self diagnosed). He has founded in 2015 a research group ACTE (Autism in Context: Theory and Experiment), the goal of which is to understand the obstacles to the language development in the context of autism.

== Biography ==
Mikhail Kissine was born in 1980 in Leningrad (now St. Petersburg) in Russia. In 2001, after hesitating between mathematics and theoretical physics he finally chose to undertake studies in linguistics in the Université libre de Bruxelles (ULB). Kissine received his diploma in 2003 and obtained a scholarship from the Wiener - Anspach Foundation to begin a Master program in linguistics in the University of Cambridge. After his studies, he returned to the ULB to start a PhD programme at the Centre of Research in Linguistics. His thesis, completed in 2007, focused on the “speech acts” – cognitive and contextual factors that can explain why the same phrase can be understood as an order, a threat or a statement. Kissine continued his career as a postdoctoral researcher thanks to the National Fund for Scientific Research and in 2012 became the assistant professor in the Department of Language and Linguistics of the Faculty of Philosophy and Literature at ULB. As of 2016 Mikhail Kissine is a professor of linguistics and director of the Centre of Research in Linguistics (LaDisco) in the ULB. Two key projects of Kissine today are the BiBi project that studies the impact of bilingualism and bidialectism on the cognitive and linguistic development and the ACTE group, the goal of which is to understand the obstacles to the language development in the context of autism.

== Publications ==
=== Books ===
- under contract: with Jessica De Villiers Language in Autism
- 2014 : with Mark Jary et Mikhail Kissine Imperatives
- 2013 : From Utterances to Speech Acts

=== Articles in peer-reviewed journals ===
- 2016 : avec Mark Jary When terminiology matters: the imperative as a comparative concept
- 2016 : avec Elise Clin et Jessica De Villiers La pragmatique dans les Troubles du Spectre Autistique. Développements récents
- 2016 : Pragmatics as meta-cognitive control
- 2012 : Pragmatics, cognitive flexibility and autism spectrum disorders
- 2009 : Illocutionary forces and what is said
