= Ink and Bone =

2016 book by Lisa Unger

- Author: Lisa Unger
- Language: English
- Published: June, 2016
- ISBN: 978-1-5011-0164-9

Ink and Bone is a book by Lisa Unger.

== Reception ==
Kirkus Reviews wrote: "Unger's beloved characters (Crazy Love You, 2015, etc.) continue a deftly balanced story that’s supernatural without a creepy aftertaste." Colette Bancroft of the Tampa Bay Times praised Unger's "believable" characterisation of Finley. Tim O'Connell of The Florida Times-Union recommended the novel to "those who like intense psychological mystery at its best."
