= Black Out (novel) =

2008 crime novel by Lisa Unger

- Author: Lisa Unger
- Language: English
- Genre: Crime fiction, Thriller
- Published: May 2008
- Publisher: Shaye Areheart Books
- Publication place: United States

Black Out is a psychological thriller by bestselling author Lisa Unger. It is a standalone novel.

== Reception ==
Publishers Weekly wrote that Unger "expertly turns what could have been a routine serial-killer story into a haunting odyssey for Annie, dropping red herrings and clues along the way until the reader feels as unsettled as Annie." Joanna Hines of The Guardian called it a "welcome addition to the kind of crime fiction American writers do so well: larger than life, pacy, with flashes of humour and wisdom, and gripping to the end." Allison Block of the Booklist wrote that Unger "makes up for an occasionally awkward narrative with the compelling character of Annie: dark, troubled, and teetering on the brink."

== Awards and honors ==
Black Out was selected as a Today show "Top 10" Summer Read, a BookSense Notable, won the Silver Medal for popular fiction in the 2008 Florida Book Awards and was a finalist in the 2009 Prix Polar International award.
