= Dael Orlandersmith =

American actress, poet and playwright

- Born: Donna Brown; 1960 (age 65–66); New York City, New York, United States
- Notable work: Yellowman

Dael Orlandersmith (born 1960) is an American actress, poet, and playwright. She is known for her Obie Award-winning Beauty's Daughter and the 2002 Pulitzer Prize Finalist in Drama, Yellowman.

== Early life ==
Orlandersmith, born Donna Dael Theresa Orlander Smith Brown in 1960, in New York City's East Harlem. She attended Hunter College but left to attend acting classes at the HB Studio and Actors Studio. She wrote of her work: "There is a theme throughout the work that I write...about childhood and the sins of the father, the sins of the mother, and how people take on the very thing they don't like about their parents and they become them.”

== Career ==
Beauty's Daughter

Her play Beauty's Daughter premiered Off-Broadway at the American Place Theatre from January 25, 1995 to March 26, 1995. Directed by Peter Askin, it is a one-woman performance piece. As described by The New York Times reviewer, the show "aims at more than an extended poetry reading. Such plotting as there is follows Diane from her puberty ("I'm a woman now/I am 13 and bleeding in a Harlem living room") to her early 30s." Orlandersmith performs all of the characters by herself "...more of a mimic than an actress. But she is a good mimic, and in switching from female to male, from Puerto Rican to Italian or Irish, from youth to elderly, she only rarely slips from characterization into caricature." Orlandersmith received the 1994-1995 Obie Award Special Citation for this play. Part of her award-winning Beauty's Daughter's program can be heard as a segment of a September 1996 taping of radio show This American Life; in this segment, Orlandersmith performs "When You Talk About Music", in which she portrays a 31-year-old Italian male who meets a black woman at a mutual friend's wedding and finds how much he misses musical expression.

Monster

Monster opened at the New York Theatre Workshop on October 31, 1996 and closed on January 19, 1997. A solo show, it was directed by Peter Askin and starred Orlandersmith.

The play ran at ACT Theatre, Seattle, Washington in January 2001 to February 11, 2001. Misha Berson, reviewing for The Seattle Times wrote: "An imposing, fervent performer-writer, Orlandersmith clearly knows this terrain by heart. It's also the treacherous landscape of her monodrama, The Gimmick, performed to high praise at ACT's Bullitt Cabaret last year. Returning with Monster, Orlandersmith is as compelling an actor as ever. Yet by comparison, this earlier script is not as agile a vehicle for her burning talents and concerns as The Gimmick.... As in The Gimmick, the destruction of innocents is a primary theme for Orlandersmith."

The Gimmick

The Gimmick was produced Off-Broadway at the New York Theatre Workshop from April 16, 1999 in previews, officially on May 5, 1999 to May 23, 1999, directed by Chris Coleman. The play was first produced at the McCarter Theatre, Princeton, New Jersey on February 28, 1998, performed by Orlandersmith and directed and conceived by Peter Askin. The play was next performed at the Long Wharf Theatre, New Haven, Connecticut on October 27, 1998. The play was written with the support of the Sundance Theatre. The Gimmick is a one-woman piece and, according to Playbill, is about "two childhood friends from East Harlem. Together they dream of careers as artists and the elusive gimmick that will take them out of their current surrounding into the life they desire." Orlandersmith received a Special Commendation for the Susan Smith Blackburn Prize, 1999-2000 for The Gimmick.

Yellowman

Yellowman premiered Off-Broadway at the Manhattan Theatre Club in October 2002 and was commissioned by McCarter Theatre in Princeton, New Jersey. Orlandersmith won the 2003 Susan Smith Blackburn Prize for Yellowman, and was a finalist for the 2002 Pulitzer Prize for Drama. The two main characters in the play, Alma, a dark skinned woman, and Eugene, a light skinned man, live in Coastal South Carolina in the Gullah region. Yellowman focuses on the issue of colorism in the black community through the character's love story.

Horsedreams

Horsedreams premiered Off-Broadway at the Rattlestick Playwrights Theater from November 17, 2011 to December 11, 2011 (originally, extended to December 17). Directed by Gordon Edelstein, the cast featured Orlandersmith (Mira), Roxanna Hope (Desiree), Michael Laurence (Loman), and Matthew Schechter (Luka). The play tells of a family destroyed by drug addiction. The CurtainUp reviewer wrote: "...it is written in a beautifully composed, essentially lyrical, narrative-driven style... 'Horsedreams' continues a recurring theme that runs through 'Yellowman', as well as other Orlandersmith's plays: how children are undone by the sins of their parents... There is nothing common about Orlandersmith's lyrical prose, and 'Horsedreams' is a fine addition to her continually growing canon."

Forever

Forever was commissioned and produced by Center Theatre Group, Kirk Douglas Theatre, Los Angeles, California. The play ran at the Kirk Douglas Theatre in October 2014. The play was presented Off-Broadway at the New York Theatre Workshop starting on April 22, 2015 in previews, to May 31, 2015, directed by Neel Keller. The one-woman play is a "semi-autobiographical exploration of the family we are born into and the family we choose." Part of the play is set in the Père Lachaise Cemetery in Paris. Orlandersmith was nominated for the 2015 Off Broadway Alliance Award, Best Solo Performance.

The play ran at the Long Wharf Theatre Stage II (New Haven, Connecticut), from January 8, 2015 to February 1, 2015.

Until the Flood

Until the Flood was commissioned by The Repertory Theatre of St Louis and premiered there in the fall of 2016. The play had its first public reading as part of The Rep's INGNITE Series on March 25, 2016. The Rep commissioned Orlandersmith to write and perform a play about the recent events in Ferguson. She fashioned a sensitive and moving portrayal of the people in the St Louis community, and how they feel about an event that placed St. Louis in a spotlight it didn't expect or relish.

== Plays ==
- Beauty's Daughter (1995, American Place Theater: New York)
- Monster (1996, New York Theatre Workshop)
- The Gimmick (1998-1999, McCarter Theatre: Princeton, Long Wharf Theatre: New Haven, & New York Theatre Workshop)
- My Red Hand, My Black Hand (2001, Long Wharf Theatre: New Haven)
- Yellowman (2002, McCarter Theatre: Princeton, Wilma Theater: Philadelphia, Long Wharf Theatre: New Haven, and Manhattan Theatre Club)
- Raw Boys (2005, Wilma Theater: Philadelphia)
- The Blue Album (2007, Long Wharf Theatre: New Haven)
- Stoop Stories (2009, Studio Theatre: Washington DC and Goodman Theater: Chicago)
- Bones (2010, Kirk Douglas Theater: Los Angeles)
- Horsedreams (2011, Rattlestick Playwrights Theater: New York)
- Black N Blue Boys/Broken Men (2012, Berkeley Rep and Goodman Theater: Chicago)
- Forever (2014, Kirk Douglas Theater: Los Angeles and New York Theatre Workshop)
- Until the Flood (2016, St. Louis Repertory Theatre)
- Antonio's Song (2019, Contemporary American Theatre Festival)
- New Age (2022, Milwaukee Repertory Theater)
- Spiritus/Virgil's Dance (2023, Contemporary American Theatre Festival)

== Awards and nominations ==
Awards

- 1995 Obie Award for Beauty's Daughter
- 2003 Susan Smith Blackburn Prize
- 2005 PEN/Laura Pels International Foundation for Theater Award for a playwright in mid-career
- 2008 Whiting Award

Nominations

- 2002 Pulitzer Prize for Drama Finalist for Yellowman
- 2003 Drama Desk Award nomination - Outstanding Play, Yellowman
