= Yellowman (play) =

2002 play by Dael Orlandersmith

- Original language: English
- Written by: Dael Orlandersmith
- Characters: Alma; Eugene; Ophelia; Robert; Thelma; Alton; Wyce; Grandfather
- Setting: South Carolina; New York

Premiere
- Date: January 10, 2002
- Place: McCarter Theatre; Princeton, New Jersey

Yellowman is a play written by Dael Orlandersmith. It was a 2002 Pulitzer Prize finalist for drama.

== Plot summary ==
Divided into five parts, the play details the relationship between Eugene, a very fair-skinned black man, and Alma, a large dark-skinned woman. Their story begins in their youth on the islands off the coast of South Carolina. During their youth, mainly covered in first part, Eugene and Alma deal with different vantages on the issues of race and class. In spite of this they become fast friends. During the second part, as they progress through adolescence and through their respective tragedies, Alma and Eugene's friendship crosses over into a more intimate relationship. The third part has a literal rift between the pair when, after graduation, Alma decides to go to school in New York and Eugene is left behind. Part four leads into the consummation of their sexual relationship when Eugene visits Alma in New York City six months later. The final scene has Eugene and Alma planning to marry. The death of his grandfather, also very fair, propels the story to its climax. Eugene inherits everything from his fair grandfather, which upsets his darker-skinned father. Eugene and his father fight, and Eugene finally kills his father landing himself in jail. Alma is left pregnant, and aborts the baby by pushing furniture at the play's close.

Note: The play requires only two actors. All other characters are portrayed by them. They switch between several characters many times in virtually every scene.

== Characters ==
- Alma: aged 38–43. A large-sized black woman. Her complexion is medium to dark brown-skinned.
- Eugene: aged 40–48. Very fair-skinned, tall, lithe-bodied, and almost feminine featured black man.
- Odelia: A large-sized black woman. Alma's mother.
- Robert: Eugene's dark-skinned father.
- Thelma: Eugene's light-skinned mother.
- Alton: A childhood friend of both Eugene and Alma. He's dark skinned. He loses contact with the two of them as they get older.
- Wyce: Eugene's childhood enemy. When they are teens, the two become friends. This friendship stays throughout the remainder of the show.
- Grandfather: Eugene's Grandfather and Thelma's father. He's light-skinned as well.

== Production history ==
=== Background ===
The McCarter Theatre, Princeton, New Jersey, commissioned Yellowman. Marion McClinton was asked to work on the play when the play was workshopped at the Sundance Festival (Utah). McClinton was busy and Blanka Zizka (Wilma Theatre co-artistic director) took over. McClinton stepped aside when Orlandersmith wanted to continue working with Zizka. Zizka said that she and Orlandersmith "have worked on the script for three years and through four drafts."

=== Productions ===
Yellowman premiered Off-Broadway at the Manhattan Theatre Club on October 1, 2002 in previews and closed on December 15, 2002. Directed by Blanka Zizka the play featured Dael Orlandersmith (Alma) and Howard W. Overshown (Eugene).

The play had engagements at several regional theatres prior to the Off-Broadway production, including the McCarter Theatre (January 10 to 27, 2002), Wilma Theatre (Philadelphia) (February 13 to March 17, 2002), Long Wharf Theatre (New Haven, Connecticut) (April 3 to May 12, 2002) and Seattle's ACT Theatre, in July to August 2002.

In regional theater, Yellowman ran at the Next Theatre in Chicago, Illinois in April to May 2004. The play ran at Stage 773 in Chicago in September to October 2011.

== Awards and nominations ==
The play was a finalist for the Pulitzer Prize for Drama, 2002. Orlandersmith won the Susan Smith Blackburn Prize for Yellowman; the award includes a monetary award of $10,000. The Wilma Theatre production won Philadelphia Barrymore Awards for Outstanding New Play and Outstanding Leading Actress in a Play (for Orlandersmith).

The play was nominated for 2003 Drama Desk Awards for Best Play, Outstanding Lighting Design, (Russell H. Champa) and Outstanding Actress in a Play (Dael Orlandersmith).

== Critical response ==
The CurtainUp reviewer of the Philadelphia and McCarter productions wrote: "The characters and situations are carefully delineated, with repetition and a building up of evidence. There are big time generational issues: the remove, the attachment, the racial hatreds, the resentment, the traits handed down, the turning into your mother... This is a wonderful play."

== Bibliography ==
- Orlandersmith, Dael, and Alexander Street Press. Yellowman. Alexandria, VA: Alexander Street Press, 2004.
