= Die for You (novel) =

2009 novel by American author Lisa Unger

- Author: Lisa Unger
- Language: English
- Genre: Crime fiction, Thriller
- Published: June 2009
- Publisher: Shaye Areheart Books
- Publication place: United States

Die for You is a 2009 novel by American author Lisa Unger. It is a standalone novel.

== Reception ==
Colette Bancroft of the St. Petersburg Times wrote that Unger "constructs Die for You in a fast-paced cinematic style" and "deftly intensifies the tension by showing us one character who knows something another urgently needs to know, and by cutting back and forth between flashback and present tense." Rebecca Higgins of the Telegraph-Journal called it a "gripping journey of grief, betrayal and forgiveness" and wrote that it is "exciting enough to render the dents in the details forgivable." Publishers Weekly called the novel an "intriguing if overstuffed stand-alone" and wrote that while Unger is typically "adept at juggling multiple plot lines", she "dilutes Isabel's story with point-of-view shifts and unnecessary subplots".

== Awards and honors ==
Die for You was named a top book for summer on the Today show and Good Morning America. It was also chosen as a top book pick by Parade Magazine and Good Housekeeping Magazine.
