= Lisa Unger =

American author (born 1970)

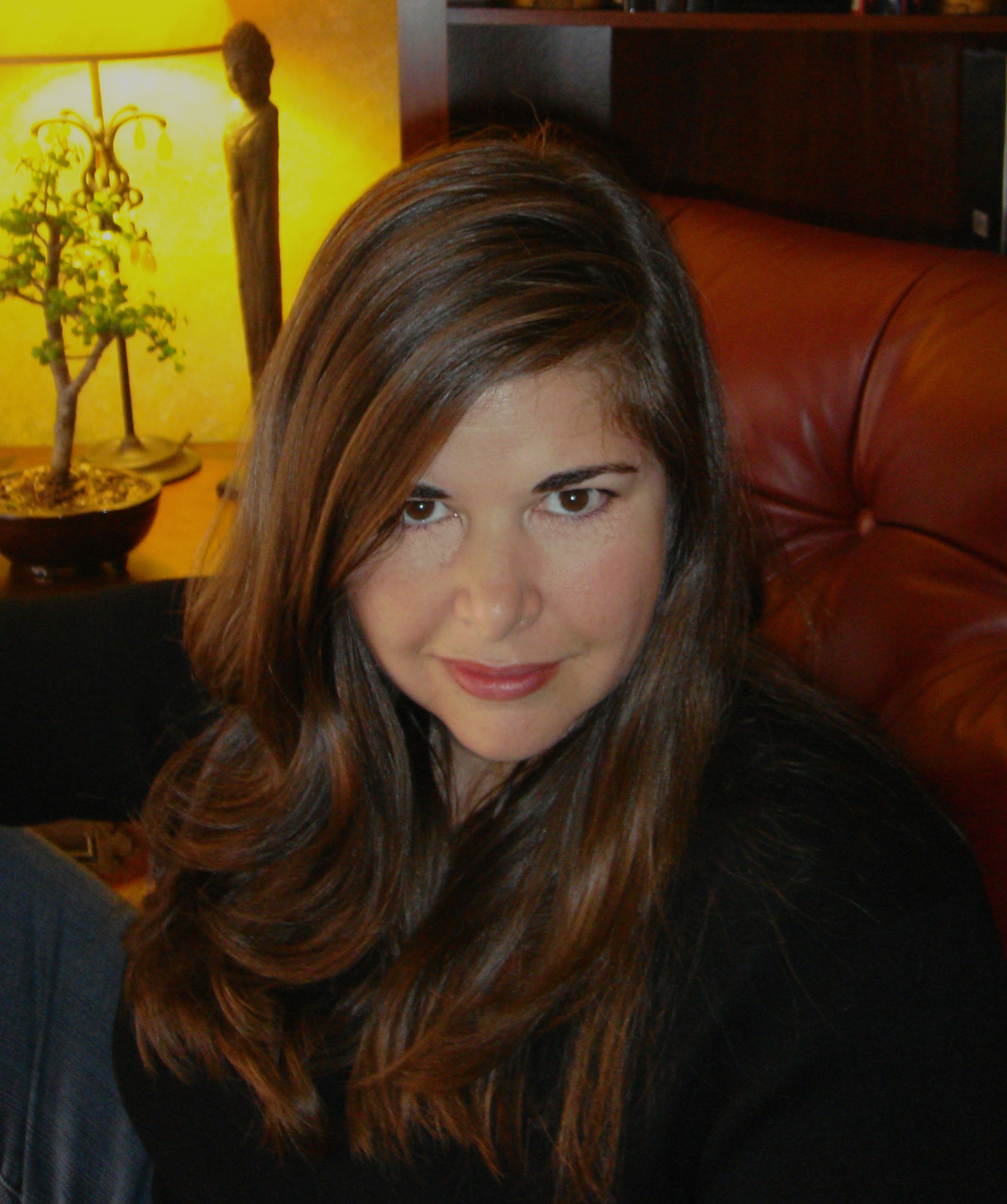
- Lisa Unger
- Born: Lisa Miscione; April 26, 1970 (age 56); New Haven, Connecticut, U.S.
- Education: The New School for Social Research
- Occupation: Novelist
- Writing career
- Period: 2002–present
- Website: lisaunger.com

Lisa Unger (née Miscione; born April 26, 1970) is an American author of contemporary fiction, primarily psychological thrillers.

== Biography ==
Miscione was born in New Haven, Connecticut but grew up in the states, England and New Jersey. She spent her teens in the Long Valley section of Washington Township, Morris County, New Jersey. Miscione moved to New York City after high school, where she graduated from the New School for Social Research and spent a decade working in publishing in New York. During a vacation in Florida, she met her future husband Jeff Unger, who was vacationing from Detroit. After marrying Unger, she resigned her job, moved to Florida and gave herself a year to sell her first novel. Fairly quickly, she found an agent and sold a deal to produce four crime novels. Her first four books were published in her maiden name of Lisa Miscione.

In 2002, she published Angel Fire, the first book featuring Lydia Strong. The book received mixed reviews. Publishers Weekly described it as "gripping and terrifying right through the carnage of its final scene" and commended the novel's depictions of grisly scenes. Rex Klett, writing for Library Journal, praised the Unger's writing style and the book's suspense. However, Kirkus Reviews called it "predictable" and "flatly written", criticizing Lydia's characterization.

In June 2006, Unger published Beautiful Lies, her first novel under her married name, through Crown Publishing Group. It became a New York Times Best Seller the week it was released.

== Awards ==
Beautiful Lies was selected as a Doubleday Book Club International Book of the Month. It was also chosen in 21st place in the top 50 "Best Books of 2006" by the editors of Amazon.com, a BookSense pick and a finalist in the International Thriller Writers Award "Best Novel" in 2007.

In the Blood won the 2015 Silver Falchion Award for Best Novel (Crime Thriller) and was a Goodreads Choice Awards Nominee for Best Mystery & Thriller 2014.

== Novels ==
=== Writing as Lisa Miscione ===
Re-released in 2011 by Crown Publishing Group.

- Angel Fire (2002) – Lydia Strong #1
- The Darkness Gathers (2003) – Lydia Strong #2
- Twice (2004) – Lydia Strong #3
- Smoke (2005) – Lydia Strong #4

=== As Lisa Unger ===
- Beautiful Lies (2006) – Ridley Jones #1
- Sliver of Truth (2007) – Ridley Jones #2
- Black Out (2008) – Standalone
- Die for You (2009) – Standalone
- Fragile (2010) – Jones Cooper #1 (The Hollows book 1)
- Darkness, My Old Friend (2011) – Jones Cooper #2 (The Hollows book 2)
- Heartbroken (2012) – Standalone
- In the Blood (2014) – Standalone (The Hollows book 3)
- Crazy Love You (2015) – Standalone (The Hollows book 4)
- Ink and Bone (2016) – Jones Cooper #3 (The Hollows book 5)
- The Red Hunter (2017) – Standalone
- Under My Skin (2018) – Standalone
- The Stranger Inside (2019) - Standalone
- Confessions on the 7:45 (2020) – Standalone
- All My Darkest Impulses (2021) – House of Crows #1
- Fog Descending (2021) – House of Crows #2
- Circling the Drain (2021) – House of Crows #3
- Love the Way You Lie (2021) – House of Crows #4
- Last Girl Ghosted (2021) – Standalone
- Secluded Cabin Sleeps Six (2022) - Standalone
- The New Couple in 5B (2024) - Standalone

== Novellas ==
- The Whispering Hollows (2016) (The Hollows series)
