= The Darkness Gathers =

2003 book by Lisa Unger

- Author: Lisa Unger
- Language: English
- Genre: Crime fiction, Thriller
- Published: April 2003
- Publisher: Minotaur Books
- Publication place: United States

The Darkness Gathers is a novel by bestselling author Lisa Unger writing as Lisa Miscione. It is the second book featuring Lydia Strong.

== Reception ==
Jean Heller of the St. Petersburg Times wrote that while the novel is "a bit slow getting started - heavy on internal dialogue and introspection on Lydia's part in the early chapters", it "soars" when in "breaks out". Jenny McLarin of the Booklist called it an "exciting story enriched by a glamorous writer-heroine who carries a Glock and knows how to use it." Rex Klett of the Library Journal wrote: "Complex protagonists, intense prose, and atmospheric descriptions combine to make Miscione's second fictional outing a solid and satisfying read. A perfect choice for mystery fans who dislike cozies." Oline H. Cogdill of the Sun Sentinel wrote that the novel is "at its strongest when Miscione shifts the action to Miami" and that she "delivers some action-packed scenes, especially a few creepy nights in Manhattan and a chilling visit to Albania."
