= Clinical =

Clinical may refer to:

== Healthcare ==
- Of or about a clinic, a healthcare facility
- Of or about the practice of medicine

== Other uses ==
- Clinical (film), a 2017 American horror thriller

== See also ==
- Clinical chemistry, the analysis of bodily fluids for diagnostic and therapeutic purposes
- Clinical death, the cessation of blood circulation and breathing
- Clinical formulation, a theoretically-based explanation of information obtained from clinical assessment
- Clinical governance, a systematic approach to maintaining and improving the quality of patient care
- Clinical linguistics, linguistics applied to speech-language pathology
- Clinical psychology, the understanding, preventing, and relieving psychologically-based distress or dysfunction
- Clinical research, to determine the safety and effectiveness of medications etc.
- Clinical significance, the practical importance of a treatment effect
- Clinical trial, experiments or observations done in clinical research
- Clinical waste, waste containing infectious (or potentially infectious) materials
- Physical examination
- Secret Clinical, an antiperspirant by Secret (deodorant brand)
