= The Beautiful Lie =

The Beautiful Lie or A Beautiful Lie may refer to:

- A Beautiful Lie, a 2005 album by Thirty Seconds to Mars
  - "A Beautiful Lie" (song), title track
- The Beautiful Lie (album), a 2006 album by Ed Harcourt
- The Beautiful Lie (TV series), an Australian drama miniseries
- The Beautiful Lie (film), a 1917 American silent film directed by John W. Noble
- The Beautiful Lie (2018 film), a 2018 Chinese children's film
- A Beautiful Lie, a 2013 album by Ever/After with drummer Jim Drnec
- The Beautiful Lie, a 2002 poetry collection by British writer Sheenagh Pugh
- The Beautiful Lie, a short film by Joshua Caldwell
- "The Beautiful Lie", a song on Dolly Parton's 2001 album Little Sparrow
- "The Beautiful Lie", a song on Alyth's 2009 album People Like Me
- "The Beautiful Lie", a 2009 song included with the song "Can You Hear Me?" by Evermore
- The Beautiful Lie, a 2016 EP by Stepson

== See also ==
- The Most Beautiful Lie, a 2009 album by Swedish performer Sebastian Karlsson
- Beautiful Lies (disambiguation)
