= In the Blood =

In the Blood may refer to:

== Books ==
- In the Blood, a 1990 novel by Nancy A. Collins
- In the Blood, a 1992 poetry collection by Carl Phillips
- In the Blood: God, Genes and Destiny, a 1997 book by Steve Jones
- In the Blood: A Memoir of My Childhood, a 2006 book by Andrew Motion
- In the Blood, a 2009 novel by Jack Kerley
- Punisher: In the Blood, a 2011 comic book by Rick Remender
- In the Blood (Unger novel), a 2014 novel by Lisa Unger
- In the Blood (Doctor Who), a 2016 novel by Jenny Colgan
- In the Blood: How Two Outsiders Solved a Centuries-Old Medical Mystery and Took on the US Army, a 2023 biographical story by Charles Barber

== Film, television and theatre ==
- In the Blood (1923 film), a British silent sports drama film
- In the Blood (1988 film), a Hong Kong action film
- In the Blood (2014 film), a film starring Gina Carano and Cam Gigandet
- In the Blood (2016 film), a Danish film
- In the Blood (Daredevil), a television episode
- In the Blood (The Outer Limits), a television episode
- In the Blood (play), a 1999 play by Suzan-Lori Parks

== Music ==
- In the Blood (album), a 1990 album by Londonbeat
- "In the Blood" (Better Than Ezra song), 1995
- "In the Blood" (John Mayer song), 2017
- "In the Blood", a 1992 single by Rob Crosby
