= Sliver of Truth =

2007 book by Lisa Unger

- Author: Lisa Unger
- Language: English
- Genre: Crime fiction, Thriller
- Published: January 2007
- Publisher: Shaye Areheart Books
- Publication place: United States

Sliver of Truth is a novel by bestselling author Lisa Unger. It is the second book featuring Ridley Jones and follows Beautiful Lies.

== Reception ==
Publishers Weekly wrote that Jenna Lamia, who narrated the audiobook, "tackles accents, gender differentials and sarcasm with great ease, leaving listeners to lose themselves in Unger's tale of intrigue." Oline H. Cogdill of the Sun Sentinel wrote: "Unger's pacing, her ability to flesh out her characters and realistic dialogue help move along Sliver of Truth. Even when the plot delves into the preposterous, Unger's energetic storytelling makes each tendril believable. The stubborn, intelligent Ridley is a character worth rooting for." Kirkus Reviews wrote that the novel "offers appealing moments of first-person honesty, but could lose readers unfamiliar with Unger's first."

== Awards and honors ==
Sliver of Truth was a BookSense pick and Literary Guild & Doubleday Book Club Main Selection
