= Mikhail Makarov =

Soviet serial killer (1962–1988)

- Born: Mikhail Olegovich Makarov; 12 March 1962; Leningrad, RSFSR
- Died: 1988; Kresty Prison, Leningrad, RSFSR
- Cause of death: Execution by shooting
- Other name: "The Executioner"
- Conviction: Murder
- Penalty: Death

Details
- Victims: 3
- Span of crimes: April – May 1986
- Country: Soviet Union
- State: Leningrad
- Date apprehended: May 1986

Mikhail Olegovich Makarov (Russian: Михаи́л Оле́гович Мака́ров; 12 March 1962 – 1988), known as The Executioner (Russian: Палач), was a Soviet serial killer, who from February to May 1986 committed three murders and one attempted murder in Leningrad. He was sentenced to death and executed in 1988.

== Biography ==
Mikhail Makarov was born on 12 March 1962, in Leningrad to a working-class family. He graduated from 8th grade of secondary school, after which he entered a vocational school and became a member of the Komsomol. After serving in the military after college, he returned to Leningrad and got a job as a travelling fitter at Lengidroenergospetsstroy. Makarov soon married, but his family life was unsuccessful. He lived with his wife's relatives, who constantly reproached him for his inability to get a single apartment from the management of the company he worked at, calling him a "parasite" and a "loser".

In his spare time, the future killer was fond of reading detective literature and watching movies on the topic. According to him, he "wanted to experience the same feeling as criminals, murderers and rapists". Makarov often fantasized about how he would kill his wife's parents, but he realized that in this case he would become the first suspect and did not risk putting his fantasies to life. Makarov explained his intention to start a criminal life with a desire to "get money to buy a cooperative apartment".

=== Crimes ===
In February 1986, Makarov attacked a 10-year-old schoolboy. The offender entered the apartment under the pretext of writing a note to the neighbours, struck the child many times with a screwdriver in the chest and head, and then, having searched the apartment, took all the money and seemingly valuable items. The boy pretended to be dead in order to save his life, but because of his injuries, he remained disabled forever. Before leaving, Makarov put out a cigarette on the victim's body, but the boy, in spite of the severe pain, did not even stir, as a result of which Makarov thought he was dead and quietly left the crime scene.

The first murder he committed was on 7 April 1986, killing an 11-year-old named Dasha. He raped her and struck her at least 30 times with a sharpened screwdriver, after which he robbed the apartment, stealing money, jewellery and various valuable and low-value things, including children's toys.

The next murder was that of a pensioner – a WWII veteran who served during the Siege of Leningrad. She went to the garbage disposal while Makarov was in the stairwell, searching for another apartment to burgle. The woman, having seen the unfamiliar man, reproached him - "everyone goes here". Because of this, the insulted Makarov dragged her into an apartment and struck the woman 51 times with a screwdriver, but did not rob the place, since, according to him, "there was nothing to profit from".

Just a few weeks later, Makarov killed a 5-year-old girl named Masha. This time, wanting to lead the investigators astray, he decided to pretend that the killer was an insane man. In order to do so, he trashed the apartment and smeared shilajit on the walls. In addition to money, jewellery and low-value items, the book "A Thousand and One Nights" from the publishing house "Irfon" in Dushanbe was stolen from the apartment. However, Makarov made a major mistake. Usually tracking down children on the street, this time he began walking around the apartments in search of a suitable victim. He broke into an apartment under the guise of being an employee of a children's library, but he saw the boy's mother open the door for him and immediately fled. The woman managed to remember the suspicious man well, and soon the police already had a facial composite of the suspect.

== Arrest, trial and execution ==
Makarov decided to take the stolen book to a second-hand bookstore that advertised in a newspaper that they were buying rare editions of books. The seller noticed blood on one of the pages, and after Makarov left, the man called the police. Using the shop's documents, the authorities identified the person who had brought the book. On the same day, he was detained near his apartment while returning from the grocery store. After his capture, he immediately confessed to his crimes – three murders and one attempted murder.

He also showed a basement on the outskirts of Leningrad, in which police officers found a cache with part of the loot. The other part, in his own words, Makarov had sold to passers-by or friends. Some of the things stolen at the crime scene were presented to his wife's parents, after which they lagged behind him for some time with reproaches.

On 27 November 1987, Makarov was sentenced to death by firing squad. He soon wrote a petition for a pardon, in which he asked to be sent to Afghanistan in order to "atone for the blood". The petition was rejected, and in 1988 he was executed.

== In the media ==
- Documentary film from the series "The investigation was conducted..." - "The Executioner and the children"
- Documentary film from the series "Legends of Soviet Investigation" - "Arabian tales"

== See also ==
- List of Russian serial killers
