= International Clinical Phonetics and Linguistics Association =

The International Clinical Phonetics and Linguistics Association (ICPLA) is an international scholarly association devoted to the study of phonetics and linguistics in relation to speech disorders and language disorders.

Specifically its mission is to:

- Stimulate thought and research into clinical phonetics and linguistics in relation to speech and language disorders.
- Facilitate interaction and communication between researchers and clinicians.
- Organise regular meetings/conferences both nationally and internationally on relevant topics in clinical phonetics and linguistics.

It was founded in 1991 at the Symposium on Advances in Clinical Phonetics held at the Cardiff Institute of Higher Education, Wales.

The official journal of the Association is Clinical Linguistics and Phonetics published since 1987 by Taylor and Francis. It has appeared on a monthly basis since 2007. The original editors were: Martin J. Ball, Raymond D. Kent, Nicole Müller, and Thomas W. Powell. Current editors are Vesna Stoyanovik and Tim Bressman.

ICPLA Presidents: William J. Hardcastle (1991-2000), Martin J. Ball (2000-2006), Sara Howard (2006-2014), Hanne Gram Simonsen (2014-2018), Vesna Mildner (2018-2023), Sharynne McLeod (2023-)

ICPLA Vice Presidents: Eric Keller (1991-1993), Jack Ryalls (1994- ), Michael R. Perkins (-2006), Sharynne McLeod (2006-2018), Vesna Stoyanovik (2018-2023), Joanne Cleland (2023-)

The Association sponsors a biennial conference. Conferences have been held in the following locations: 1991 Cardiff, Wales, UK; 1992 London, UK; 1993 Helsinki, Finland; 1994 New Orleans, USA; 1996 Munich, Germany; 1997 Nijmegen, The Netherlands; 1999 Montreal, Canada; 2000 Edinburgh, UK; 2002 Hong Kong, SAR China; 2004 Lafayette, USA; 2006 Dubrovnik, Croatia; 2008 Istanbul, Turkey; 2010 Oslo, Norway; 2012 Cork, Ireland; 2014 Stockholm, Sweden; 2016 Halifax, Canada; 2018 Malta; 2021 Edinburgh, Scotland (online); 2023 Salzburg, Austria
