= Mikhail Stroganov =

Russian footballer (born 1968)

Personal information
- Full name: Mikhail Aleksandrovich Stroganov
- Date of birth: 4 December 1968 (age 57)
- Height: 1.86 m (6 ft 1 in)
- Positions: Defender; midfielder

Youth career
- EShVSM Moscow

Senior career*
Years	Team	Apps	(Gls)
1986–1988	EShVSM Moscow	37	(2)
1989	FC Krasnaya Presnya Moscow	33	(0)
1990	Sogdiana Jizzakh	21	(0)
1991–1992	FC Okean Nakhodka	56	(9)
1993–1995	FC Arsenal Tula	89	(12)
1996	FC Don Novomoskovsk	37	(4)
1997	FC Lada-Togliatti-VAZ Togliatti	10	(0)
1997	FC Samotlor-XXI Nizhnevartovsk	2	(0)
1998	FC Spartak-Chukotka Moscow (amateur)	28	(0)
1999	FC Spartak-Chukotka Moscow		
2007	FC Olimp-SKOPA Zheleznodorozhny		
- * Club domestic league appearances and goals

Mikhail Aleksandrovich Stroganov (Russian: Михаил Александрович Строганов; born 4 December 1968) is a former Russian football player.
