= Mikhail Sagin =

Russian footballer

Personal information
- Full name: Mikhail Vasilyevich Sagin
- Date of birth: 3 October 1962 (age 64)
- Height: 1.74 m (5 ft 8 1/2 in)
- Positions: Forward; midfielder

Youth career
- ROShISP-10 Rostov-on-Don

Senior career*
Years	Team	Apps	(Gls)
1984–1985	FC Baltika Kaliningrad	54	(0)
1986–1989	FC Dynamo Stavropol	81	(1)
1989	FC Rostselmash Rostov-on-Don	27	(1)
1990	SKA Odessa	33	(1)
1991–1993	FC Rostselmash Rostov-on-Don	64	(0)
1992–1993	→ FC Rostselmash-2 Rostov-on-Don (loans)	16	(1)
1993–1995	FC Istochnik Rostov-on-Don	71	(3)
1997	FC Istochnik Rostov-on-Don (amateur)		
2000	FC Neftyanik Tarasovskiy		
- * Club domestic league appearances and goals

Mikhail Vasilyevich Sagin (Russian: Михаил Васильевич Сагин; born 3 October 1962) is a former Russian football player.
