= Beautiful Lies (novel) =

2006 novel by Lisa Unger

- First edition
- Author: Lisa Unger
- Language: English
- Series: Ridley Jones
- Genre: Crime fiction, Thriller
- Published: April 2006
- Publisher: Shaye Areheart Books
- Publication place: United States
- Followed by: Sliver of Truth

Beautiful Lies is a 2006 thriller novel by bestselling author Lisa Unger. It is the first book featuring Ridley Jones. Crown Publishing Group published the novel in June 2006 and it became an instant New York Times Best Seller the week it was released.

== Reception ==
Colette Bancroft of the St. Petersburg Times called it a "satisfying thriller" and a "complex and gripping story about the dark side of the best of intentions". Sarah Weinman of The Baltimore Sun called it an "entertaining thriller, paced just right to engage and not overwhelm the reader, Unger's exploration of deeper themes like frayed family ties makes this a memorable effort." Lee Sutter of The Tribune wrote that while the novel "starts strong, complemented by a likable, chatty heroine about whom the reader can't help but care", it "never delivers the compelling plot it promises."

== Awards and honors ==
Beautiful Lies was selected as a Doubleday bookclub International Book of the Month. It was also a BookSense pick and a finalist in the International Thriller Writers Organization "Best Novel" Award in 2007.
