= Clinical linguistics =

Sub-discipline of applied linguistics

Clinical linguistics is a sub-discipline of applied linguistics involved in the description, analysis, and treatment of language disabilities, especially the application of linguistic theory to the field of Speech-Language Pathology. The study of the linguistic aspect of communication disorders is of relevance to a broader understanding of language and linguistic theory.

Established in 1991, the International Clinical Phonetics and Linguistics Association stands as the unofficial governing body of the field. Spearheading research in this domain, the Journal of Clinical Linguistics and Phonetics was founded by Martin J. Ball.

Practitioners of clinical linguistics typically work in Speech-Language Pathology departments or linguistics departments. They conduct research with the aims of improving the assessment, treatment, and analysis of disordered speech and language, and offering insights to formal linguistic theories. While the majority of clinical linguistics journals still focus only on English linguistics, there is an emerging movement toward comparative clinical linguistics across multiple languages.

== History ==
The study of communication disorders has a history that can be traced all the way back to the ancient Greeks. Modern clinical linguistics, however, largely has its roots in the twentieth century, with the term ‘clinical linguistics’ gaining wider currency in the 1970s, with it being used as the title of a book by prominent linguist David Crystal in 1981. Widely credited as the ‘father of clinical linguistics’, Crystal's book Clinical Linguistics went on to become one of the most influential books of the field, as this new discipline was mapped out in great detail.

The application of linguistic science to the analysis of speech and language disorders has always been necessary but understudied. Roman Jakobson, a Russian structural linguist, was one of the first to try to apply linguistic theory to the study of Speech-Language Pathology. Published in 1941, his book Kindersprache, Aphasie und allgemeine Lautgesetze recorded the results of his analysis of language use in child language acquisition and in adults with acquired aphasia. Although Jakobson's book only gained influence in the Anglophone world following the publication of the translated version Child language, Aphasia and Phonological Universals in 1968 its impact was felt in the United States and the United Kingdom, among others, where changes of approach were adopted for phonological, grammar, semantic and other areas of language impairment. His observation that deviant sound patterns obeyed similar rules to those of regular language systems remains a guiding principle in clinical linguistics even today. Most notably, the same approach was also adopted by Crystal and his colleagues in their development of a set of language ‘profiling’ procedures.

== Disciplines ==
These are the main disciplines of clinical linguistics:

=== Clinical phonetics ===
Phonetics is a branch of linguistics that studies the sounds of human speech. Clinical phonetics involve applications of phonetics to describe speech differences and disorders, including information about speech sounds and the perceptual skills used in clinical settings.

=== Clinical phonology ===
Phonology is one of the branches of linguistics that is concerned with the systematic organization of sounds in spoken languages and signs in sign languages. Unlike clinical phonetics, clinical phonology focuses on the application of phonology on interpretations of speech sounds in a particular language and how it deals with phoneme.

=== Clinical prosody ===
In linguistics, prosody is concerned with elements of speech that are not individual phonetic segments (vowels and consonants) but are properties of syllables and larger units of speech. Prosody is essential in communicative functions such as expressing emotions or affective states.

=== Clinical morphology ===
Morphology is the study of words, how they are formed, and their relationship to other words in the same language. It analyses the structure of words and part of words, such as stems, root words, prefixes, and suffixes.

=== Clinical syntax ===
Syntax is the set of rules, principles and processes that govern the structure of sentences in a given language, usually including word order. Every language has a different set of syntactic rules, but all languages have some form of syntax.

=== Clinical semantics ===
Semantics is the study of the interpretation of signs or symbols used in agents or communities within particular circumstances and contexts.

=== Clinical pragmatics ===
Pragmatics is a subfield of linguistics and semiotics that studies the ways in which context contributes to meaning. It refers to the description and classification of pragmatic impairments, their elucidation in terms of various pragmatic, linguistics, cognitive and neurological theories, and their assessment and treatment.

=== Clinical discourse ===
In corpus linguistics, discourse refers to the study of language expressed in corpora (samples) of “real world” text, the codified language of a field of enquiry, or a statement that determines the connections among language and structure and agency.

== Applications ==
Linguistic concepts and theories are applied to assess, diagnose and administer language disorders. These theories and concepts commonly involve psycholinguistics and sociolinguistics. Clinical linguists adopt the understanding of language and the linguistic disciplines, as mentioned above, to explain language disorders and find approaches to treat them. Crystal pointed out that applications of linguistics to clinical ends are highly relational. In his book ‘Clinical Linguistics’, Crystal references many commonly known disorders with linguistic knowledge. Some examples from his book are as follows:

1. Voice orders - involves sub- and supra-laryngeal settings involved in dysphonia; syllabic vs polysyllabic distinction to account for volume and timbre dimensions in voice; synchronic vs diachronic distinction should be used for more recognisable voice quality; interaction between non-segmental phonetic and phonological variables (p. 192-193).
2. Cleft palate syndrome - phonological variable and statement must be interpreted in perceptual and production terms; distribution of segments in an utterance (p. 193).
3. Fluency - segmental phonetic level (taking into consideration prolongations, abnormalities in muscle tension) can affect the production of speech phonologically; transition smoothness at the prosodic level (tempo, pause etc.); semantic factors including avoidance of particular lexical terms, coupled with grammatical structure between and adult vs child (p. 194).
4. Aphasia - speech comprehension and production requires non-segmental organization of language involving; Notions of segment, feature and process would aid in the analysis of phonological problems (p. 194).
5. Dyspraxia - requires multiple analysis in terms of segments, features and processes for phonological realization; more serious cases would require the analysis of disturbances in non-segmental phonology (p. 195).
6. Deafness - systematic analysis of segmental and non-segmental phonological organizations, and phonetic abilities; semantic, the grammatical structure as well as sociolinguistic interaction studies are vital dimensions that cannot be neglected for the oral production and comprehension for the deaf (p. 195).

Some broad linguistics methods that are commonly used in the treatment of patients mentioned by Cummings (2017) include:

- Use of standardized and norm-referenced tests
- Conversation analysis
- Discourse analysis

Linguistics sets the foundation of many speech and language diagnostic tests. More specifically, some speech and languages assessments include the test of articulation, which assesses phonetic articulation based on the pronunciation of certain phonemes such as Malayalam articulation test and the Kannada articulation test etc. The language age of a minor is determined by looking at linguistic aspects (i.e. case markers, synonyms etc.). The Early Reading Skills Test examines the Phoneme-Grapheme correspondence for diagnosing learning disability, whereas tests like Test of Emergent Expressive Morphology (TEEM) evaluates one's understanding of morphemes. Other examples of speech-language pathology (SLP) testing instruments like the Bracken Basic Concept Scale (BBCS) and Clinical Evaluation of Language Fundamentals (CELF) evaluate a broad range of language skills which include children's acquisition of basic concepts of colours, letters, numbers, formulation of words and sentences, among other language and cognitive skills. Tests such as Peabody Picture Vocabulary Test (PPVT) assesses instead the receptive vocabulary of children, and even adults.

== The future of clinical linguistics ==
The past works of linguists such as Crystal were applicable to a wide range of communication disorders at every linguistic level. However, with the influx of new insights from disciplines such as genetics, cognitive neuroscience and neurobiology (among others), it is no longer sufficient to just focus on the linguistic characteristics of a particular speech impairment.

In today's context, one of the challenges in clinical linguistics includes identifying methods to bridge the knowledge of different fields to build a more holistic understanding. The translation of general research that has been done into effective tools for clinical practice is another aspect that requires future work.

== Bibliography ==
- Crystal, D. (1981). Clinical linguistics. In Arnold, G.E., Winckel, F. & Wyke, B. D. (Eds.), Disorders of Human Communications 3. New York, NY: Springer-Verlag Wien.
- Crystal, D. (2013). Clinical linguistics: Conversational reflections. Clinical Linguistics & Disorders 27:4, 236–243.
- Crystal, D. (1984). Linguistic encounters with language handicap. Oxford, UK: B.Blackwell
- Crystal, D. (1982). Profiling linguistic disability. London: Arnold.
- Crystal, D., Fletcher, P., & Garman, M. (1976). Grammatical analysis of language disability. London: Arnold.
- Cummings, L. (2017). Clinical linguistics. Oxford University Press. Retrieved from http://oxfordre.com/linguistics/view/10.1093/acrefore/9780199384655.001.0001/acrefore-9780199384655-e-337
- Grunwell, P. (1982). Clinical phonology. London: Croom Helm.
- Ingram, D. (1976). Phonological disability in children (1st ed.). New York, NY: Elsevier.
- Jakobson, R. (1941). Kindersprache, aphasie und allgemeine lautgesetze. Uppsala, Sweden: Almqvist and Wiksell.
- Jakobson, R. (1968). Child language, aphasia and phonological universals. The Hague: Mouton.
- Müller, N. (2000). (Eds). Pragmatics in Speech and Language Pathology: Studies in clinical applications. Amsterdam: John Benjamins Publishing. Retrieved from https://books.google.com/books?id=TXE9AAAAQBAJ&dq=clinical+linguistics&pg=PP1
- Neurath, O., Carnap. R. & Morris, C. F. W. (Editors) (1955). International Encyclopedia of Unified Science. Chicago, IL: University of Chicago Press.
- Perkins, M. R. (2011). Clinical linguistics: Its past, present and future. Clinical Linguistics & Phonetics, 25(11-12):922-7. Retrieved from: https://www.researchgate.net/publication/51519279_Clinical_linguistics_Its_past_present_and_future/stats
- Perkins, M. R. (2007). Pragmatic Impairment. Cambridge: Cambridge University Press.
- Ravi, S. K. (n.d.). The scope of clinical linguistics and applications of clinical linguistics. Academia. Retrieved from https://www.academia.edu/1759317/The_Scope_of_Clinical_Linguistics_and_Applications_of_Clinical_Linguistics
- SLP Resource Guide: Standardized Assessment Resource List. (n.d). Retrieved from https://www.iidc.indiana.edu/pages/speech-pathology-assessments
