= Nicole Müller (linguist) =

Professor of Speech and Hearing Sciences

Nicole Müller (born 1963) is Professor of Speech and Hearing Sciences at University College Cork in Ireland, with specialisms in aphasia and dementia, having held the position of Professor of Speech-Language Pathology at Linköping University in Sweden until the end of January 2017.

== Early life ==
She was born in Germany, and brought up in Herxheim bei Landau/Pfalz, attending high school in Landau.

== Education ==
She holds a master's degree from the University of Bonn, and a DPhil from the University of Oxford. Her doctoral thesis was on the agent in Early Irish and Early Welsh.

== Career ==
She worked at universities in Northern Ireland, England, and Wales before moving to the United States in 2000. She holds dual German-US citizenship.

Until the summer of 2014, she was Hawthorne-BORSF Endowed Professor III in the Department of Communicative Disorders at the University of Louisiana at Lafayette. Professor Müller was awarded a Fulbright scholarship to study in Galway, Ireland for nine months in 2014–15. In 2014, she moved to Sweden to take up a Professoship in Speech-Language Pathology. She assumed the position of Professor of Speech and Hearing Sciences at University College Cork in February 2017. She co-edited the journal Clinical Linguistics and Phonetics until 2021 and served as treasurer of the International Clinical Phonetics and Linguistics Association (ICPLA) between 2000 and 2008. Professor Müller has published widely in the areas of clinical linguistics and Celtic linguistics.

== Selected publications ==
- Schrauf, R. W. and Müller, N. (Eds.) (2014). Dialogue and Dementia: Cognitive and Communicative Resources for Engagement. New York: Psychology Press.
- Müller, N. and Mok, Z. (2012). Applying Systemic Functional Linguistics to conversations with dementia: The linguistic construction of relationships between participants. Seminars in Speech and Language, 33, pp. 5–15.
- Guendouzi, J.A. and Müller, N. (2006). Approaches to Discourse in Dementia. Mahwah, NJ: Lawrence Erlbaum.
- Müller, N. (1999). Agents in Early Irish and Early Welsh. Oxford: Oxford University Press.
