= Mikhail L. Surguchev =

Russian scientist (1928–1991)

- Born: 16 November 1928
- Died: 1 April 1991 (aged 62)
- Occupation: Scientist

Mikhail L. Surguchev (1928—1991) was a prominent petroleum scientist in the USSR. He was widely recognized in Russia and internationally as an expert in reservoir engineering, oil field development, waterflooding, enhancing and improving oil recovery (EOR and IOR) methods.

== Education ==
Surguchev studied at Ishimbai Petroleum Engineering High School, and Kuibyshev Industrial Institute (University).

== Career ==
After graduating from the University, Mikhail Surguchev obtained his Doctorate at the State Research Institute Giprovostokneft in Samara, where he developed a blocked inter-contour system for oilfield development by waterflooding. This system was implemented in a number of major oil fields, particularly those in the Volga-Ural and Western Siberia Regions.

In 1966, Dr. Surguchev was invited to join the All-Union Oil and Gas Scientific Research Institute (VNIIneft) in Moscow, the main research institute of the petroleum industry in the country. In 1971 he was appointed Head of the Department of Enhanced Oil Recovery at the VNIIneft Institute; subsequently becoming the Deputy Director, and ultimately the Director. In his years at this Institute, he guided and took part in a range of theoretical and experimental investigations of EOR processes. He was also the project manager for the development of the giant Samotlor oil field in Western Siberia, and was responsible for initiating a number of improved oil recovery projects in reservoirs situated in the Volga-Urals, Western Siberia, and other parts of the country.

In 1986, Dr. Surguchev became the Director General of the Inter-branch Scientific Technological Complex “Oil Recovery” in Moscow, a position that he held until his untimely death in 1991. Under his leadership, the complex prospered, and has given considerable support to the industry in improving the technology of oil recovery.

Dr. Surguchev’s contribution to the science and technology of oil recovery included more than 200 scientific papers, 18 monographs and 30 patented inventions. A large number of his technical innovations were implemented by the petroleum industry.

Dr. Surguchev was elected a member of the USSR Academy of Sciences. He was a Laureate of the Lenin Prize for Scientific and Technical Achievements (1966) and an Honored Scientist of the Russian Federation (1989). He has been awarded the USSR Order of the Red Banner of Labour.

Dr. Surguchev served as Vice Chairman of the Executive Board of the World Petroleum Congress and was a member of the Steering Committee for the European Symposia on Improved Oil Recovery. He promoted international cooperation and the exchange of information among scientists and engineers in the petroleum industry.

== Bibliography ==
- M.L Surguchev: “Secondary and Tertiary EOR Methods”, (Nedra, Moscow, 1985).
- M.L. Surguchev, A.T. Gorbunov, D.P. Zabrodin: “Methods of residual oil extraction”, (Nedra, Moscow, 1991).
- I.N. Sharbatova and M.L. Surguchev: “Cyclic Injection Reservoir Simulation”, (Nedra, Moscow, 1988).
- M.L. Surguchev, V.P. Tabakov, and V.M. Kivorenko: “Prospects of horizontal and branched-multihole wells application for oilfields development”, (Neftanoe Khozaistvo 9,37-39 (1991)).
- M.L. Surguchev and A.A. Bokserman: “Creation and large-scale commercial application of cyclic water flooding and changing of flow direction in oil-saturated formations to increase the efficiency of its development”, (VNIINeft´Izd., Moscow, 1987).
- M.L. Surguchev, L.M. Surguchev: "Water-Gas Injection Process for Heterogeneous Reservoirs", Scientific and Technical Journal of the Oil and Gas Industry "Neftepromyslovoye Delo", Moscow, No. 6-7, 1993, pp 3–13.
- M.L. Surguchev, L.M. Surguchev: "Cogeneration Efficiency and Application in Oil Industry", Neftjanoye Hozjastvo, No 6, 1989, pp 11–14.
