= Mikhail Trinoga =

Soviet geologist (born 1949)

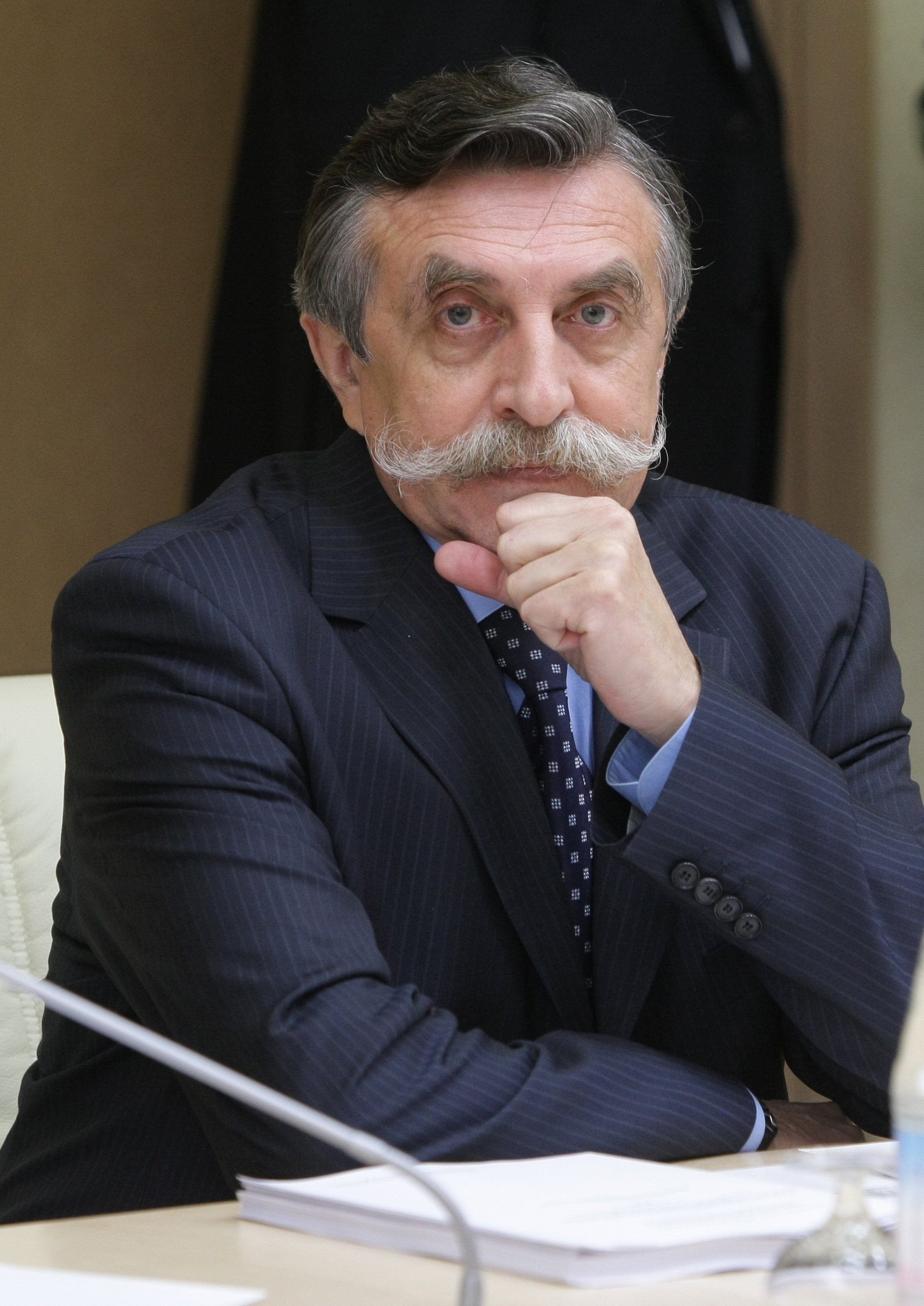
November 2009

Mikhail Ivanovich Trinoga (Russian: Михаил Иванович Тринога) is an Adviser to the President of Russia.

== Biography ==
Born April 10, 1949 in Ivano-Frankivsk region of Ukraine.

1971 – graduated as an engineer from the Ivano-Frankivsk Oil and Gas Institute, specializing in the development of oil and gas fields.

1970–1980 – worked in the USSR gas industry.

1980–1984 – Head of Operational and Production Services and principal geologist in Mostransgaz.

1984–1986 – Senior Engineer and Deputy Head of the Department of the Gas Industry Ministry of the USSR.

1986 – Referent, Senior Specialist and Chief Specialist at the Council of Ministers of the USSR.

1990 – graduated from the Institute of Professional Skill Improvement of the Academy of National Economy under the Council of Ministers.

1991 – Chief Specialist of the Cabinet of Ministers of the USSR.

1992–1998 – Deputy Head of the Secretariat of the Prime Minister of the Russian Federation.

1998–2000 – First Deputy Head of Administration at Gazprom.

2000–2004 – Deputy Chief of Staff of the Government of the Russian Federation.

2004–2005 – Aide to the Chief of Staff of the Presidential Executive Office and Deputy Head of the Secretariat of the Presidential Executive Office.

2005–2008 – Head of the Secretariat of the First Deputy Prime Minister of the Government of the Russian Federation Dmitry Medvedev.

Since May 13, 2008 – Adviser to the President of the Russian Federation.

== Sources ==
- Kremlin.ru

This article incorporates material from the website of the President of Russia and is used under the Creative Commons and Attribution 4.0 International , 8 April 2015 - on Attribution 3.0 Unported Licence.
