= Heartbroken (novel) =

Psychological thriller by Lisa Unger

- Author: Lisa Unger
- Language: English
- Genre: Crime fiction, psychological thriller
- Published: June 2012
- Publisher: Crown Publishing
- Publication date: June 26, 2012
- Publication place: United States
- Pages: 384
- ISBN: 978-0-307-46520-7

Heartbroken is a standalone psychological thriller novel by American author Lisa Unger, published by Crown on June 26, 2012. Set on a privately owned island in the Adirondack Mountains, it follows three women whose lives intersect amid family tensions and a violent crime.

== Plot ==
Birdie Burke owns Heart Island, an isolated retreat on a lake in the Adirondacks, where she and her husband Joe hold an annual family gathering. Her daughter Kate has a strained relationship with her and approaches the visit with unease. Kate has written a novel drawing on her aunt's and grandmother's journals, which recount a tragic love affair connected to the island.

After her husband and son are unable to accompany her, Kate travels to the island with her daughter Chelsea and Chelsea's friend Lulu. Meanwhile, Emily, a waitress at the Blue Hen, becomes involved in a plan by her boyfriend Dean and his associate to rob her workplace. The crime sets off a sequence of events that brings Emily and Dean into contact with Birdie and her visitors.

== Reception ==
Publishers Weekly praised Unger's development of the three central characters and her exploration of the damage caused by lies.

Associated Press wrote that Unger "immerses the reader in the nuances of the frustrations and anxiety felt when obligation is the reason for a family visit" and "examines the feelings of abandonment and anger when it seems your family doesn't care." Oline H. Cogdill of the Sun Sentinel wrote that the novel "works well as an intense psychological thriller that explores a family with complex relationships, destructive secrets and uneasy legacies." Kirkus Reviews wrote that Unger is a "master at building characters that crackle with personality and purpose, and the women in this novel are no exception" and "knows how to write a taut thriller" while criticising her characterisation of Emily, which "keeps this book from being extraordinary."

Publishers Weekly included Heartbroken among its picks of the best new books for the week of June 25, 2012.
