= Mikhail Perez =

Dominican Republic footballer

Personal information
- Full name: Mikhail Meyreles Perez
- Date of birth: 26 October 1990 (age 36)
- Place of birth: Santo Domingo, Dominican Republic
- Height: 1.73 m (5 ft 8 in)
- Position: Forward

Youth career
- Football School Jorge Rolando Bauger
- IMG Soccer Academy
- Fiorentina

Senior career*
Years	Team	Apps	(Gls)
2009	Sestese		
2010	FC Snagov	0	(0)
2010–2011	Gloria Bistrița	0	(0)
2011	Bellaria Igea	0	(0)

International career
2011	Dominican Republic	1	(0)
- * Club domestic league appearances and goals

Mikhail Meyreles Perez (born 26 October 1990) is a former international soccer player from the Dominican Republic who played as a forward. He is related to Consuelo Mutu, who was the wife of Romanian footballer Adrian Mutu. Adrian Mutu was the one who brought him to Fiorentina and to FC Snagov, the Romanian press nicknaming Perez as "Consuelo's nephew" and "Mutu's nephew".

== International career ==
Mikhail Meyreles Perez played one international game for the Dominican Republic in July 2011 when coach Clemente Domingo Hernández sent him on the field in the 56th minute to replace Rafael Flores in a 2–0 away victory against Anguilla at the 2014 World Cup qualifiers.
