= Mikhail Yevseyev =

Russian footballer (born 1973)

Personal information
- Full name: Mikhail Mikhailovich Yevseyev
- Date of birth: 11 January 1973 (age 53)
- Place of birth: Moscow, Russian SFSR
- Height: 1.76 m (5 ft 9 1/2 in)
- Position: Defender

Youth career
- FC Lokomotiv Moscow

Senior career*
Years	Team	Apps	(Gls)
1989	FC Lokomotiv Moscow	0	(0)
1990–1991	FC Dynamo-2 Moscow	22	(0)
1991–1993	FC Lokomotiv Moscow	9	(0)
1992–1993	→ FC Lokomotiv-d Moscow (loans)	70	(4)
1994–2001	FC Gazovik-Gazprom Izhevsk	226	(3)
2002	FC Irtysh Omsk	10	(0)
2002	FC Dynamo Izhevsk	5	(0)
2003	FC Gazovik-Gazprom Izhevsk	6	(0)
2004	FC Dynamo Kirov	27	(0)
2005	FC Gazovik-Gazprom Izhevsk	32	(0)
2006	FC Lobnya-Alla Lobnya	5	(0)

Managerial career
- 2008–2009: FC MVD Rossii Moscow (administrator)
- * Club domestic league appearances and goals

Mikhail Mikhailovich Yevseyev (Russian: Михаил Михайлович Евсеев; born 11 January 1973) is a former Russian football player.
