= Mikhail Yuryevich Simonov =

Mikhail Simonov
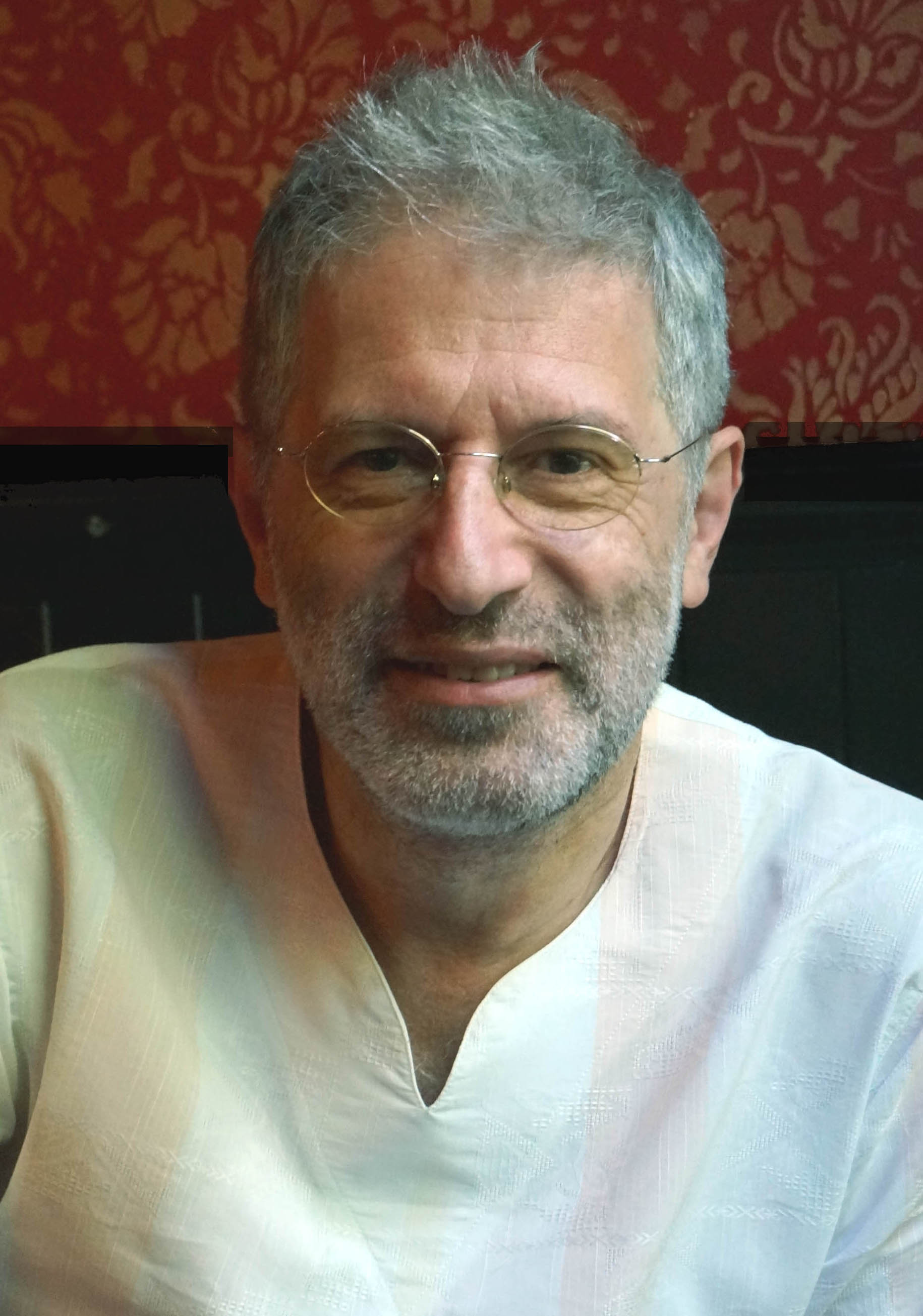
- Born: Mikhail Yuryevich Simonov; March 4, 1959 (age 66)
- Occupation: Russian direct marketing pioneer
- Known for: Silver Mercury festival president

Mikhail Yuryevich Simonov (Russian: Михаил Юрьевич Симонов, born 1959) is a Russian direct marketing pioneer and personified communications expert, president of Silver Mercury advertising and marketing festival, the member of Silver Archer Russia Awards jury, Russian Association of Marketing Services president and Association of Russian Communications Agencies Vice-president.

== Early life ==
Simonov was born on March 4, 1959, in Moscow. Studied at a specialized school with an emphasis on Spanish. In 1976, enrolled at the Moscow Institute of Management. Post-graduation, worked at the Academy of Municipal Economy, developing mathematical models for urban transport systems. Simonov began his commercial activities in 1987.

== Career ==
He founded the Poster Publicity agency in 1993 (Russia Direct holding since 2000, Russian Association of Marketing Services since 2007) and Russian Association of Direct Marketing in 1994. He became the president of this Association and brought it to the world market over 15 years.

Simonov became the president of the Russian Association of Marketing Services in 2009 and offered his plan of marketing services reformation in Russia. He founded Kotler Awards in 2014 as the award for the best achievements in Russian marketing and advertising.

In 1990s Simonov was the political strategist of Russian politicians Yegor Gaidar, Victor Chernomyrdin and Boris Yeltsin. Simonov was the first to propose using personal letters and personal communications during election campaigns. He is a member of the Consultative Council of Authority for Personal Data Subjects Rights.

== Books ==
- Шахнес, Татьяна (2014-10-25). Рожденная с отраслью. История успеха, рассказанная от первого лица (in Russian). Litres. ISBN 978-5-457-65356-6.
