= Mikhail Sovetlyanov =

Russian footballer

Personal information
- Full name: Mikhail Vladimirovich Sovetlyanov
- Date of birth: 3 June 1987 (age 39)
- Height: 1.88 m (6 ft 2 in)
- Positions: Defender; midfielder

Youth career
- FC Shinnik Yaroslavl

Senior career*
Years	Team	Apps	(Gls)
2005–2008	FC Shinnik Yaroslavl	1	(0)
2008	FC Dynamo Vologda	20	(0)
2009	FC Rostov Veliky Rostov		
2009	FC Khimik Dzerzhinsk	13	(0)
2009	FC Gazovik Orenburg	7	(0)
2010	FC Torpedo Vladimir	18	(0)
2012	FC Dynamo Kostroma	10	(0)
2012	FC Oryol	5	(0)
2013	FC Tekstilshchik Ivanovo	0	(0)
- * Club domestic league appearances and goals

Mikhail Vladimirovich Sovetlyanov (Russian: Михаил Владимирович Советлянов; born 3 June 1987) is a former Russian professional football player.

== Club career ==
He played in the Russian Football National League for FC Shinnik Yaroslavl in 2007.
