= Rebecca Wright =

Rebecca Wright (5 December 1947, Springfield, Ohio – 29 January 2006, Chevy Chase, Maryland) was an American ballerina, teacher, choreographer and ballet school director.

== Biography ==
Her background in gymnastics and tap dance was a pivotal influence in early dance training under Josephine Schwarz at the Dayton Ballet. In 1966, she joined the then prominent but small Joffrey Ballet as a principal until 1975, becoming a soloist with American Ballet Theatre (ABT) until her retirement from dance in 1982. She can be seen on television and on DVD as The Doll in Mikhail Baryshnikov's production of The Nutcracker, which was telecast in 1977.

After her retirement, she married the dancer George de la Peña (who appears in the Baryshnikov Nutcracker) and turned to teaching and choreographing including serving as full time ballet faculty at California Institute of the Arts before becoming director of the Washington School of Ballet in 2004.

De la Peña and Wright had two children before they separated.

She held a dance professorship at the University of California at Los Angeles and was director of dance programs at Adelphi University in Garden City, New York. She also spent several years as director of dance programs at the private St. Paul's School in Concord, NH.

In 2004, she succeeded Mary Day, the founder of the Washington School of Ballet and Washington Ballet, who had run the school for 60 years.

She died in 2006 at her home in Chevy Chase, Maryland, of cancer.
