= Mikhail Ageyev =

Soviet and Russian scientist (1931–2005)

Mikhail Dmitriyevich Ageyev (Russian: Михаил Дмитриевич Агеев; 14 May 1931 – 19 November 2005) was a Soviet and Russian scientist, an expert in the field of navigation and control systems of moving objects, and a member of the Russian Academy of Sciences (1992).

== Biography ==
Ageyev was born on 14 May 1931 in Cheremhovo, a town of Irkutsk Oblast, to the family of an architect Dmitry Mikhaylovich Ageyev. The family lived in Novosibirsk, and then in Odessa. After the beginning of World War II his father served in the army, while Ageyev lived in the evacuation in Novosibirsk and Sverdlovsk.

In 1948, he entered the Moscow Institute of Communication Engineers. In 1950, he transferred to the Leningrad Institute of Precision Mechanics and Optics (LIPMO) and graduated with honours, majoring in gyroscopic tools and devices. After his graduation in LIPMO in 1954, Ageyev worked in Leningrad at the Krylov Institute. In 1960, he defended his thesis on the theme "Finding the Optimal Control Law of Marine Stabilizers".

In 1961, he became an associate professor at the Kuibyshev Far Eastern Polytechnic Institute (FEPI) in Vladivostok. In 1962, he was appointed as an associate professor of the Electric Drive and Automation of Industrial Enterprises Department. From 1962 to 1972, Ageyev worked as the head of the Department of Gyroscopic Instruments and Devices at the FEPI. He organized the first training sessions of electricians and engineers in the Russian Far East, in the field of instrument engineering. Those students later became leaders in the instrument production industry, factory directors, heads of departments, candidates, and doctors of science.

In 1969, Ageyev started organizing a lab devoted to navigation and control systems, and he also worked part-time in the Russian Far East Department of Technical Cybernetics of the Academy of Sciences of the USSR. In 1970, he defended his doctoral dissertation on the topic associated with the synthesis of near-Earth inertial navigation. In 1972, Ageyev moved to a permanent job in the Institute of Automation and Control Processes that was part of the Far Eastern Scientific Center, Academy of Sciences of the USSR. He was chosen first as the head of the Laboratory of Navigation and Control Systems, and then became the head of the department of Underwater Hardware, Development and Experimental Works. In a short time, he formed a skilled research team, which helped him develop a new scientific direction, underwater robotics. On 23 December 1987, he became a corresponding member of the USSR Academy of Sciences in the Department of Mechanical Engineering, Mechanics and Control Processes.

In 1988, he headed the Far Eastern Institute of Marine Technology Problems (Russian Academy of Sciences), which was created under his leadership. Using experimental models of underwater robots, he successfully solved a number of unique and important state tasks in the ocean at great depths, performing research and development by order of the military industrial complex of the USSR Council of Ministers. On 11 June 1992, Ageyev became a full member of the Russian Academy of Sciences at the Department for Problems of Mechanical Engineering, Mechanics and Control Processes. The latter two were his specialization. On 19 November 2005, he died.

Ageyev was awarded the Order of the Red Banner of Labour, the Order of Honour in 1996, and the Jubilee Medal "300 Years of the Russian Navy" for in-depth research in the field of marine technology, creation and application of deep-water autonomous unmanned vehicles in solving a number of unique and important state tasks in the ocean at great depths. In 1990, he was awarded with an international diploma "INTERVETION / ROV'90" of the first class for the best work of the year and contribution to the progress of underwater robotics.

He was an author of numerous scientific works and inventions. Until recent days, he was a member of many specialized councils for doctoral and master's theses, a chairman of the Joint Scientific Council on Physical-Mathematical and Technical Sciences; many scientific papers and publications were published under his editorship. Ageyev was a member of the American Scientific Society for Marine Technology, as well as a member of the organizing committees of several international forums.

He had two children.
