= In the Blood (Unger novel) =

2014 book by Lisa Unger

- Author: Lisa Unger
- Language: English
- Genre: Crime fiction, Thriller
- Published: January 2014
- Publisher: Gallery Books
- Publication place: United States
- ISBN: 978-1-4516-9117-7

In the Blood is a 2014 psychological thriller by American author Lisa Unger. It is a standalone novel, but takes place in The Hollows.

== Reception ==
Kirkus Reviews described In the Blood as "another scary winner from an accomplished pro," while Tim O'Connell of The Florida Times-Union called it a "page-pounding psychological maze that will have you scratching your head until the very end."

According to Gerald Bartell of The Washington Post, "Not only does Lana’s back story provide insight into her life, but it also illuminates the travails of the other characters in ways that will be pertinent for many readers. These perceptions add depth to the book, upgrading it from a thriller that’s purely entertaining to one that resonates far beyond the scope of Unger’s well-constructed plot." Awards and honors
