= Fragile (novel) =

2010 book by Lisa Unger

- Author: Lisa Unger
- Language: English
- Genre: Crime fiction, Thriller
- Published: August 2010
- Publisher: Shaye Areheart Books
- Publication place: United States

Fragile is a novel by bestselling author Lisa Unger. It is the first book set in The Hollows, and features Jones Cooper.

== Reception ==
Kirkus Reviews called it "Cleverly plotted and emotionally engaging." Jeff Ayers of the Associated Press wrote that Unger "steps back from her suspense roots this time to tell a slow, simmering, tragic tale." Publishers Weekly wrote: "Since the Hollows is so small, characters continually rehash secrets—and rumors—so that Unger relies too heavily on the community's interconnectedness to bolster her plot."

== Awards and honors ==
Fragile was chosen by ABC's Good Morning America as a top book pick for great summer reads and selected as a Hot Book by Harper's Bazaar. Target named Lisa Unger an "Emerging Author".
