= Mikhail Spokoyny =

- Михаил Юрьевич Спокойный
- Born: February 7, 1955 (age 71); Odesa, Ukraine
- Citizenship: United States
- Education: Odesa Technological Institute; Leningrad Institute of Fine Mechanics and Optics
- Known for: CEO and Managing Director of the Aerospace International Research Center

Mikhail Spokoyny (Ukrainian: Михайло Юрійович Спокійний, Russian: Михаил Юрьевич Спокойный; born on February 7, 1955, in Odesa, Ukraine) is a Ukrainian/Russian and American scientist. He has a PhD in Engineering with a specialization in Thermal physics. He is the CEO and Managing Director of the Aerospace International Research Center GmbH.

== Biography ==
Mikhail Spokoyny was born on February 7, 1955, in Odesa, Ukraine. In 1977 he graduated from the Odesa Technological Institute with a degree in Thermal physics. Later, in 1984, he earned a PhD in Engineering with the same specialization from the Leningrad Institute of Fine Mechanics and Optics.

After graduating from the Odesa Technological Institute, from 1977 to 1989, Mikhail Spokoyny worked at Kvant, a Soviet research and production institute, where he was involved in project Monolit — the thermostabilization of Lenin’s body in the Mausoleum, one of the main projects of the institute. From 1989 to 1993, he held the position of Science Director at the Institute of New Technologies at the Russian Academy of Science. From 1993 to 2001, he held a number of executive positions at various companies in the IT. He is a founder of several startup companies including SOTEL, Ltd.

In 2001 he moved to the United States, first as a visiting scholar at the University of California, Los Angeles (UCLA), and later holding various scientific and development positions throughout the state of California. He also worked in the Mechanical Department of Drexel University as a Research Professor and Research Director. He has more than 12 US patents and has authored more than 80 scientific publications.

In 2013 Mikhail Spokoyny was appointed CEO and Managing Director of the Aerospace (Asgardia) International Research Center (AIRC) in Vienna, Austria. The center publishes the space magazine Room — The Space Journal and conducts research in different areas for the space industry. In that position, Mr. Spokoyny participated in the AIRC’s main project, the formation of Asgardia the Space Nation, that was announced in Paris, France, on October 12, 2016.

== Personal life ==
Mikhail Spokoyny emigrated to the United States in 2001 and acquired US citizenship in 2009. The spelling used prior to obtaining citizenship was Michael Spokoiny. .

His father, Yury Efimovich Spokoyny (1929—2009), was a professor at the Odesa Polytechnic Institute, and his mother, Irma Borisovna Spokoyny (Brain-Litwin) (born in 1930), was a high school French teacher.

Mikhail is married to Anna Spokoyny (maiden name Kim). They have four children (Alexander, Boris, Daniel and Elina):

== Selected publications ==
- Michael Spokoiny, Vladimir Trofimov, Xinliang Qiu, and Jim Kerner. Enhanced Heat Transfer in a Channel with Combined Structure of Pins and Dimples. 9th AIAA/ASME Joint Thermophysics and Heat Transfer Conference, Fluid Dynamics and Co-located Conferences. San Francisco, CA, United States, 2006.
- Mikhail Spokoyny, Vladimir Trofimov, Xinliang Qiu, James M. Kerner. Compact Heat Sink With Combined Structures of Dimples-Protrusions With Pin-Fins or Micro-Channels: Review, Simulation and Experimental Data. 2010 14th International Heat Transfer Conference/American Society of Mechanical Engineers (ASME). Washington, DC, USA, 2010.
- Michael Spokoiny, Vladimir Trofimov. Collider jets cooling method of microprocessors. 2011 International Microelectronics and Packaging Society ATW on Thermal Management. Session 12 "Liquid, phase-change and refrigeration cooling." Palo Alto, CA, USA, 2011.

== Selected patents ==
- Heat exchanging apparatus and method for transferring heat. Patent number: 10168112. Date of Patent: January 1, 2019. Inventors: Mikhail Spokoyny, Nick Ortenberg.
- Interlocked jets cooling method and apparatus. Patent number: 8490419. Date of Patent: July 23, 2013. Inventors: Volodymyr Zrodnikov, Mikhail Spokoyny.
- Method for conditioning a cooling loop of a heat exchange system. Patent number: 8141620. Date of Patent: March 27, 2012. Inventors: Volodymyr Zrodnikov, James M. Kerner, Michael Spokoiny.
- Fluid-operated heat transfer device. Patent number: 7992625. Date of Patent: August 9, 2011. Inventors: Michael Spokoiny, James M. Kerner, Xinliang Qiu, James W. Maurus, Boris M. Spokoyny.
- Airflow heat dissipation device. Patent number: 7814965. Date of Patent: October 19, 2010. Inventors: Michael Spokoiny, James M. Kerner, Xinliang Qiu, Craig J. Lux, James W. Maurus.
- Heat dissipating device. Patent number: 7578337. Date of Patent: August 25, 2009. Inventors: Michael Spokoiny, James M. Kerner, Craig J. Lux, James M. Maurus.
