= Mikhail Kuzovlev =

Russian banker (born 1966)

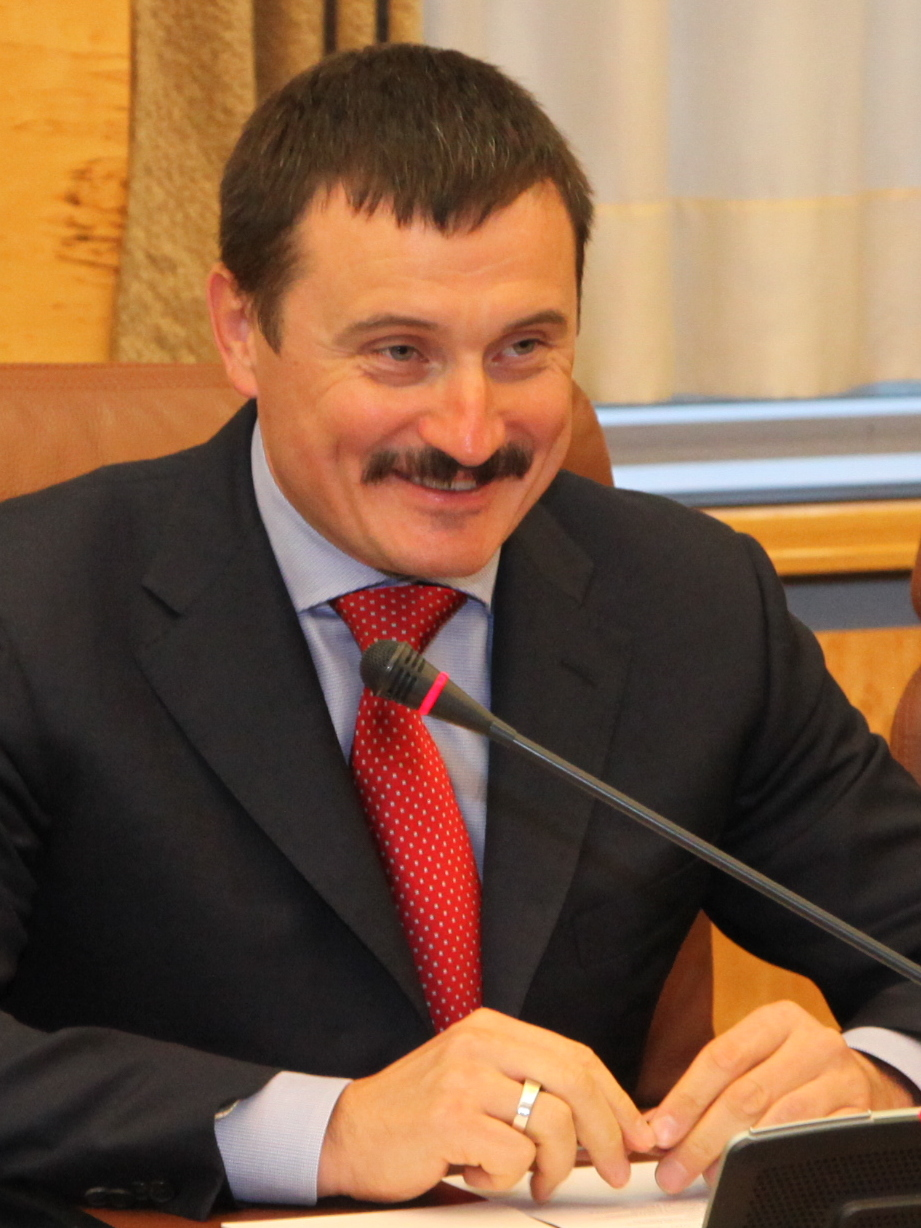
- Born: Mikhail V. Kuzovlev; August 8, 1966 (age 60); Krasnogorsk, Russia
- Education: Moscow State Institute of International Relations
- Occupations: President and Chairman of Bank of Moscow
- Website: www.bm.ru

Mikhail V. Kuzovlev is a prominent Russian banker and financier, president and chairman of the management board of JSC Bank of Moscow.

== Biography ==
Born 8 August 1966 in Krasnogorsk, Moscow Region. In 1988 Graduated from Moscow State Institute of International Relations under the Ministry of Foreign Affairs of the USSR, with a degree in International Economic Relations. Fluent in English and Persian.

== Career ==
1990—1996: senior deputy director and then vice-president of the Probusiness Foreign Trade Centre.

1997: head of Financial Operations Division and then vice-chairman of the management board of Commercial Bank Probusinessbank.

2000: transferred to the position of senior vice-president of AKB Probusinessbank.

2002: vice-president of JSC Foreign Trade Bank (Vneshtorgbank).

2004: chairman of the management board of ZAO KB GUTA-BANK (later renamed as VTB-24).

2005: appointed president and chairman of the management board of VTB-24.

2004: executive managing director; since 2008 up to April 2014: chairman of the board of directors of Russian Commercial Bank (Cyprus) Ltd (Cyprus).

2008 – April 2011: senior vice-president and chairman of the management board of OAO Bank VTB.

2010 – June 2012: member of the board of directors of JSC RZD.

Since April 2011: president and chairman of the management board of JSC Bank of Moscow.

June 2012 – June 2013: member of the board of directors of Russia's biggest oil company, JSC NK Rosneft.

== Work at the Bank of Moscow ==
Soon after Yuri Luzhkov retired from the post of Moscow Mayor and the Bank of Moscow was included on the privatisation plan, Mikhail Kuzovlev, as senior vice-president and chairman of the management board of bank VTB, participated in the negotiations on the VTB Group acquiring the controlling block of shares of the Bank of Moscow.

In January 2011, the board of directors of the Bank of Moscow approved Mikhail Kuzovlev and president and chairman of the management board of Bank VTB Andrey Kostin as candidate members of the new Bank of Moscow board of directors and recommended Mikhail Kuzovlev for approval by the shareholders' meeting as president of the Bank of Moscow.

On 22 February 2011, the VTB Group concluded the transaction to acquire 46.48% of the shares in the Bank of Moscow from the Moscow Government. Mikhail Kuzovlev headed up the work on checking the financial status of the Bank of Moscow.

On 24 February 2011, Andrey Kostin was elected chairman of the board of directors of the Bank of Moscow, and Mikhail Kuzovlev was appointed senior vice-president of the Bank of Moscow.

On 12 April 2011, president of the Bank of Moscow Andrey Borodin and his senior vice-president Dmitriy Akulinin were dismissed from their posts by court (ruling) for the period of the investigation in the CJSC Premier Estate case. The board of directors of the Bank of Moscow appointed Mikhail Kuzovlev as acting president of the Bank of Moscow.

On 21 April 2011, an extraordinary meeting of the shareholders elected Mikhail Kuzovlev as president of the Bank of Moscow by a majority vote.

In November 2011, the Bank of Moscow development strategy for 2011–2014 as a member of the VTB Group was approved with the participation of Mikhail Kuzovlev. According to the strategy, the Bank of Moscow will develop as an independent, universal, commercial bank within the VTB Group. The priority region for the bank's activities is the Moscow area. Today, the bank is developing its business by focusing on high-tech innovative services and products. The Bank of Moscow is the VTB Group's base bank for working with medium(-sized) and small business, as well as individuals in Moscow and the Moscow Region.

== Public activities ==
Business Council for Co-operation with Cyprus

Since March 2011, Mikhail Kuzovlev has been chairman of the Business Council for Co-operation with Cyprus. In September 2011, he signed memoranda on attracting direct foreign investment into Cyprus and Russia and also on simplification of exchange of investment and new technologies between the countries with the Cyprus Agency for promoting investment and the Cyprus-Russia Business Association.

Russian Union of Industrialists and Entrepreneurs

On 8 February 2012, within the scope of a meeting of the CC of the RUIE for the Central Federal Area, Mikhail Kuzovlev was elected chairman of the Coordinating Committee of the Russian Union of Industrialists and Entrepreneurs for the given area. On 9 February, at the XIX (V) RUIE Congress, Mikhail Kuzovlev was elected a member of the management board of the all-Russia association of employers of the RUIE and RUIE Vice-President.

Tushino Children’s City Hospital

In July 2012, Mikhail Kuzovlev was elected chairman of the Guardianship Council of the Tushino Children's City Hospital. Mikhail Kuzovlev began his work as chairman of the Guardianship Council by resolving urgent problems: within the scope of co-operation with the Tushino City Hospital, which is the biggest children's hospital in Europe, 100 computers were provided for setting up a specialised network.

Civic Chamber of the Moscow Region

Since July 2012, Mikhail Kuzovlev has been a Member of the Civic Chamber of the Moscow Region.

Moscow Chamber of Commerce and Industry

In October 2012 Mikhail Kuzovlev was elected president of Moscow Chamber of Commerce and Industry

Civic Chamber of Moscow

Since April 2013 Mikhail Kuzovlev is a chairman of the Civic Chamber of Moscow.
