= David Ingram (linguist) =

Irish linguist

- Born: April 25, 1944
- Education: Stanford University (PhD)
- Scientific career
- Fields: linguistics
- Institutions: Arizona State University
- Thesis: The Role of Person Deixis in Underlying Semantics (1970)

David Ingram (born April 25, 1944) is an American linguist and Emeritus Professor of Linguistics at Arizona State University. He is best known for his works on first language acquisition and phonology. A festschrift in his honor titled On under-reported monolingual child phonology edited by Elena Babatsouli was published in 2020.

== Books ==
- Phonological Disability in Children
- First Language Acquisition: Method, Description and Explanation
- Procedures for the Phonological Analysis of Children's Language
