= People Like Me (album) =

Studio album by Alyth
- Released: 2009
- Recorded: 2008
- Genre: Scottish folk, Celtic music
- Label: Navigator Records

Alyth chronology
An Iomall (2000)	People Like Me (2009)

People Like Me is a studio album by Scottish traditional singer Alyth, and is also her second studio album. The album features much of Alyth's live band, as well as her partner and members of Scottish folk band Lau. The album features fewer songs in Gaelic than her previous album and collaborations. It was recorded in both Ireland and Scotland.

== Reception ==
AllMusic's Chris Nickson rated the album four stars out of five. The Scotsman's Kenny Mathieson rated it all four stars and then called it "excellent". The Skinny's Gordon Bruce rated it three out of five and said that the saxophone performance made the music "a little cheesy." IndieLondon's Jack Foley rated it three out of five.

== Track listing ==
1. "Nuair Bha Mi Og" – 4:57
2. "The Queen & The Soldier" – 5:00
3. "The Voices Set (Puirt)" – 4:39
4. "The Beautiful Lie" – 3:10
5. "Dh'fhag e gun chadal am dhusgadgh mi" – 5:00
6. "Neptune" – 3:56
7. "A Mhairead Og" – 3:29
8. "'Til Morning Will Come" – 3:00
9. "Chadil mi raoir air an airigh" – 4:26
10. "I Wonder What's Keeping My True Love Tonight" – 5:03
11. "A Smuggler's Prayer" – 4:44
12. "mo ghaol oigfhear a chuil duinn" – 4:07
13. "People like Me" – 5:02
