= Mikhail Yudin (footballer) =

Russian footballer (1976–2020)

Personal information
- Full name: Mikhail Mikhailovich Yudin
- Date of birth: 18 January 1976
- Place of birth: Lipetsk, Russian SFSR
- Date of death: 22 March 2020 (aged 44)
- Height: 1.85 m (6 ft 1 in)
- Positions: Defender; midfielder

Senior career*
Years	Team	Apps	(Gls)
1993–1998	FC Metallurg Lipetsk	142	(4)
1998	FC Oryol	10	(0)
1999	FC Saturn-2 Ramenskoye	37	(1)
2000–2001	FC Arsenal Tula	63	(3)
2002	FC Kuban Krasnodar	17	(0)
2003–2004	FC Metallurg Lipetsk	28	(0)
2004	FC Metallurg-Kuzbass Novokuznetsk	2	(0)
2005–2007	FC Metallurg Lipetsk	71	(1)
2008	FC Amur Blagoveshchensk	24	(0)
2009	FC Spartak Tambov	27	(2)
2010–2011	FC Metallurg Lipetsk	24	(0)
- * Club domestic league appearances and goals

Mikhail Mikhailovich Yudin (Russian: Михаил Михайлович Юдин; 18 January 1976 – 22 March 2020) was a Russian professional football player.

== Club career ==
He played 8 seasons in the Russian Football National League for 5 different clubs.
