= Blanka Zizka =

Czech-American theatre director and playwright (born 1955)

- Born: 1955 (age 70–71); Mladá Boleslav, Czechoslovakia
- Occupations: Director, playwright
- Website: www.wilmatheater.org

Blanka Zizka (Czech: Blanka Žižková; born 1955) is a Czech-born American theatre director and playwright. She is a Co-Founding Artistic Director of The Wilma Theater.

== Biography ==
Blanka Zizka was born in 1955 in Mladá Boleslav, Czechoslovakia. As a child, she regularly attended puppet theatre and developed a love for theatre. She also took dance lessons. She defected from Czechoslovakia in 1976 with a nine-month-old baby and her future husband, Jiri Zizka (Czech: Jiří Žižka). They came to Philadelphia, Pennsylvania, and joined up with a feminist experimental theatre collective called the Wilma Project (as it was then known).

By 1981, she and Jiri became co-artistic directors of the Wilma, known for their bold productions of the works of Bertolt Brecht, Eugene Ionesco and Tom Stoppard.

In 1995, Blanka Zizka's Barrymore Award-winning production of Jim Cartwright's ROAD was presented at the International Theatre Festival in the Czech Republic, the first American company to be invited. CBS News called the Wilma "one playhouse that has emerged from the shadow of the Great White Way to make history on its own." Blanka and Jiri set up shop in a former industrial space on Sansom Street, refurbishing it themselves with the help of friends, creating what would become the Adrienne Theater, which for many years was a locus for new theatrical work in Philadelphia. The company remained there until 1996 when it moved to its current home on Avenue of the Arts, at the intersection of Broad and Spruce Streets.

Blanka became the sole Artistic Director of the Wilma shortly before Jiri's death in 2010. In 2011, she created a resident company called HotHouse. This ensemble of actors train together every month in European-style techniques as disparate as that of Greek director Theodorus Terzopoulos and Jean-René Toussaint's Primitive Voice.

Zizka has directed the following works: Paula Vogel's Don Juan Comes Home from Iraq, Richard Bean's Under the Whaleback, Tony Kushner's Angels in America, Tadeusz Słobodzianek's Our Class, Sarah Ruhl's In the Next Room, and Macbeth.

In 2020, she returned to the Czech Republic and led the workshop Tělo to ví ('The Body Knows').

In 2021, she retired from her position as the Wilma's Artistic Director.

== Awards and honors ==
In the fall of 2011, Zizka received the Zelda Fichandler Award from the Stage Directors and Choreographers Foundation, which recognizes an outstanding director or choreographer transforming the regional arts landscape. As of early 2018, she has won 14 Barrymore Awards for Excellence in Theatre, which recognizes excellence for professional theatre in the Greater Philadelphia region.
