= Barrymore Award for Outstanding Overall Production of a Play =

Annual American theater award

- Awarded for: Excellence in Theatre
- Location: Philadelphia, PA
- Presented by: Theatre Philadelphia
- Currently held by: The Comeuppance by Branden Jacobs-Jenkins (2025)
- Website: theatrephiladelphia.org

The Barrymore Award for Outstanding Overall Production of a Play is an annual award given to the best (non-musical) play running in the Greater Philadelphia, as determined by Theatre Philadelphia.

Terrence McNally's Master Class at Philadelphia Theatre Company won the first award in 1995. Wilma Theater has won the most awards with seven wins total. Philadelphia Theatre Company and People's Light both have four wins, followed closely by Arden Theatre Company with three wins. Additionally, Lantern Theater Company, InterAct Theatre Company, and Theatre Exile each have two wins.

== Award winners ==
Key

and bold indicates the winner.

=== 1990s ===
Year	Production	Author	Producer	Ref.
1995
1995	**Master Class**	**Terrence McNally**	**Philadelphia Theatre Company**	
1995	Distant Fires	Kevin Heelan	People's Light	
1995	Of Mice and Men	John Steinbeck	Philadelphia Drama Guild	
1995	Road	Jim Cartwright	Wilma Theater	
1995	Sign of the Lizzard	Louis Lippa	People's Light	
1996
1996	**Love! Valour! Compassion!**	**Terrence McNally**	**Philadelphia Theatre Company**	
1996	Dancing at Lughnasa	Brian Friel	Villanova Theatre	
1996	The Effect of Gamma Rays on Man-in-the-Moon Marigolds	Paul Zindel	Walnut Street Theatre	
1996	I am a Man	OyamO	Philadelphia Theatre Company	
1996	My Mother Said I Never Should	Charlotte Keatley	People's Light	
1997
1997	**Quills**	**Doug Wright**	**Wilma Theater**	
1997	Angels in America	Tony Kushner	Villanova Theatre	
1997	Arcadia	Tom Stoppard	Wilma Theater	
1997	Death of a Salesman	Arthur Miller	Arden Theatre Company	
1997	Oleanna	David Mamet	Walnut Street Theatre	
1998
1998	**A Midsummer Night's Dream**	**William Shakespeare**	**Arden Theatre Company**	
1998	Hedda Gabler	Henrik Ibsen	Arden Theatre Company	
1998	Jack and Jill	Jane Martin	People's Light	
1998	Michigan Impossible	Robert Christophe	Venture Theatre	
1998	Molly's Delicious	Craig Wright	Arden Theatre Company	
1999
1999	**Lebensraum**	**Israel Horovitz**	**InterAct Theatre Company**	
1999	Coyote on a Fence	Bruce Graham	Arden Theatre Company	
1999	A Flea in Her Ear	Georges Feydeau	People's Light	
1999	Gross Indecency: The Three Trials of Oscar Wilde	Moisés Kaufman	Philadelphia Theatre Company	
1999	Hard Times	Charles Dickens & Stephen Jeffreys	People's Light	

=== 2000s ===
Year	Production	Author	Producer	Ref.
2000
2000	**The Invention of Love**	**Tom Stoppard**	**Wilma Theater**	
2000	Dimly Perceived Threats To The System	Jon Klein	People's Light	
2000	Red Herring	Michael Hollinger	Arden Theatre Company	
2000	Side Man	Warren Leight	Philadelphia Theatre Company	
2000	Wit	Margaret Edson	Philadelphia Theatre Company	
2001
2001	**The Laramie Project**	**Moisés Kaufman**	**Philadelphia Theatre Company**	
2001	Book of Days	Lanford Wilson	People's Light	
2001	It's All True	Jason Sherman	InterAct Theatre Company	
2001	The Old Settler	John Henry Redwood	New Freedom Theatre	
2001	Picasso at the Lapin Agile	Steve Martin	Arden Theatre Company	
2002
2002	**Equus**	**Peter Shaffer**	**Mum Puppettheatre**	
2002	The Dresser	Ronald Harwood	Bristol Riverside Theatre	
2002	The Play About the Baby	Edward Albee	Philadelphia Theatre Company	
2002	Flop	N/A	Pig Iron Theatre Company	
2002	Yellowman	Dael Orlandersmith	Wilma Theater	
2003
2003	**In the Blood**	**Suzan-Lori Parks**	**People's Light**	
2003	All My Sons	Arthur Miller	Arden Theatre Company	
2003	Big Love	Charles L. Mee	Wilma Theater	
2003	The Magic Fire	Lillian Garrett-Groag	Wilma Theater	
2003	Red	John Logan	Wilma Theater	
2004
2004	**Jesus Hopped the 'A' Train**	**Stephen Adly Guirgis**	**Wilma Theater**	
2004	The Comedy of Errors	William Shakespeare	Lantern Theater Company	
2004	Mary's Wedding	Stephen Massicotte	Act II Playhouse	
2004	Permanent Collection	Thomas Gibbons	InterAct Theatre Company	
2004	Travels with My Aunt	Graham Greene & Giles Havergal	Lantern Theater Company	
2005
2005	**Take Me Out**	**Richard Greenburg**	**Philadelphia Theatre Company**	
2005	The Clean House	Sarah Ruhl	Wilma Theater	
2005	Recent Tragic Events	Craig Wright	1812 Productions	
2005	String of Pearls	Michele Lowe	People's Light	
2005	Trumbo	Christopher Trumbo	Philadelphia Theatre Company	
2006
2006	**Richard III**	**William Shakespeare**	**Lantern Theater Company**	
2006	The Foocy	Anthony Lawton	Lantern Theater Company	
2006	Killer Joe	Tracy Letts	Theatre Exile	
2006	Man from Nebraska	Tracy Letts	People's Light	
2006	Opus	Michael Hollinger	Arden Theatre Company	
2007
2007	**Of Mice and Men**	**John Steinbeck**	**Walnut Street Theatre**	
2007	The Four of Us	Itamar Moses	1812 Productions	
2007	Glengarry Glen Ross	David Mamet	Theatre Exile	
2007	"Master Harold"...and the Boys	Athol Fugard	Lantern Theater Company	
2007	The Pillowman	Martin McDonagh	Wilma Theater	
2008
2008	**Six Characters in Search of an Author**	**Luigi Pirandello**	**People's Light**	
2008	Frozen	Bryony Lavery	InterAct Theatre Company	
2008	Skylight	David Hare	Lantern Theater Company	
2008	Bug	Tracy Letts	Theatre Exile	
2008	Eurydice	Sarah Ruhl	Wilma Theater	
2009
2009	**Something Intangible**	**Bruce Graham**	**Arden Theatre Company**	
2009	No Child...	Nilaja Sun	Delaware Theatre Company	
2009	The Hothouse	Harold Pinter	Lantern Theater Company	
2009	Rock 'n' Roll	Tom Stoppard	Wilma Theater	
2009	Scorched	Wajdi Mouawad	Arden Theatre Company	

=== 2010s ===
Year	Production	Author	Producer	Ref.
2010
2010	**Becky Shaw**	**Gina Gionfriddo**	**Wilma Theater**	
2010	The Breath of Life	David Hare	Lantern Theater Company	
2010	The History Boys	Alan Bennett	Arden Theatre Company	
2010	If You Give a Mouse a Cookie	Laura Numeroff	Arden Theatre Company	
2010	Welcome to Yuba City	N/A	Pig Iron Theatre Company	
2011
2011	**In the Next Room (or The Vibrator Play)**	**Sarah Ruhl**	**Wilma Theater**	
2011	Around the World in Eighty Days	Mark Brown & Jules Verne	Delaware Theatre Company	
2011	Let Me Down Easy	Anna Deavere Smith	Philadelphia Theatre Company	
2011	My Wonderful Day	Alan Ayckbourn	Wilma Theater	
2011	The Lieutenant of Inishmore	Martin McDonagh	Theatre Exile	
2012
2012	**Body Awareness**	**Annie Baker**	**Wilma Theater**	
2012	The Aliens	Annie Baker	Theatre Exile	
2012	Angels in America	Tony Kushner	Wilma Theater	
2012	The Outgoing Tide	Bruce Graham	Philadelphia Theatre Company	
2012	Twelfth Night	William Shakespeare	Pig Iron Theatre Company	
2013	No award given			
2014
2014	**Down Past Passyunk**	**A. Zell Williams**	**InterAct Theatre Company**	
2014	Annapurna	Sharr White	Theatre Exile	
2014	The Brothers Size	Tarell Alvin McCraney	Simpatico Theatre Project	
2014	Circle Mirror Transformation	Annie Baker	Theatre Horizon	
2014	Don Juan Comes Home from Iraq	Paula Vogel	Wilma Theater	
2014	I Am My Own Wife	Doug Wright	Theatre Exile	
2014	In A Dark Dark House	Neil LaBute	Simpatico Theatre Project	
2015
2015	**The Whale**	**Samuel D. Hunter**	**Theatre Exile**	
2015	Caught	Christopher Chen	InterAct Theatre Company	
2015	Dangerous House	Jen Silverman	InterAct Theatre Company	
2015	In The Blood	Suzan-Lori Parks	Theatre Horizon	
2015	Rapture, Blister, Burn	Gina Gionfriddo	Wilma Theater	
2015	To The Moon	Jen Childs	1812 Productions	
2015	Who's Afraid of Virginia Woolf?	Edward Albee	Theatre Exile	
2016
2016	**The Invisible Hand**	**Ayad Akhtar**	**Theatre Exile**	
2016	Disgraced	Ayad Akhtar	Philadelphia Theatre Company	
2016	The Nether	Jennifer Haley	InterAct Theatre Company	
2016	The Radicalisation of Bradley Manning	Tim Price	Inis Nua	
2016	Spine	Clara Brennan	Inis Nua	
2016	Stella and Lou	Bruce Graham	People's Light	
2016	Time Is On Our Side	R. Eric Thomas	Simpatico Theatre	
2017
2017	**The Seagull**	**Anton Chekhov**	**EgoPo Classic Theater**	
2017	Hand to God	Robert Askins	Philadelphia Theatre Company	
2017	How to Use a Knife	Will Snider	InterAct Theatre Company	
2017	The Legend of Georgia McBride	Matthew Lopez	Arden Theatre Company	
2017	The Mountaintop	Katori Hall	People's Light	
2017	Stupid Fucking Bird	Aaron Posner	Arden Theatre Company	
2017	When the Rain Stops Falling	Andrew Bovell	Wilma Theater	
2018
2018	**Morning's at Seven**	**Paul Osborn**	**People's Light**	
2018	Blood Wedding	Federico García Lorca	Wilma Theater	
2018	The Browning Version	Terrence Rattigan	Orbiter 3	
2018	The Gap	Emma Goidel	Azuka Theatre	
2018	The Revolutionists	Lauren Gunderson	Theatre Horizon	
2018	Skeleton Crew	Dominique Morisseau	People's Light	
2018	The Wild Duck	Henrik Ibsen	Quintessence Theatre Group	
2019
2019	**Gem of the Ocean**	**August Wilson**	**Arden Theatre Company**	
2019	Boycott Esther	Emily Acker	Azuka Theatre	
2019	Indecent	Paula Vogel	Arden Theatre Company	
2019	Kill Move Paradise	James Ijames	Wilma Theater	
2019	Morir Sonyando	Erlina Ortiz	Passage Theatre Company	
2019	The Great Leap	Lauren Yee	InterAct Theatre Company	
2019	xoxo moongirl	Nicole Burgio	Almanac Dance Circus Theatre	

=== 2020s ===
Year	Production	Author	Producer	Ref.
2020	No award given			
2021	No award given			
2022	No award given			
2023
2023	**The Royale**	**Marco Ramirez**	**Lantern Theater Company**	
2023	Clyde's	Lynn Nottage	Arden Theatre Company	
2023	Kiss	Guillermo Calderón	Wilma Theater	
2023	A Shadow That Broke the Light	Charlie DelMarcelle	Simpatico Theatre	
2023	Thurgood	George Stevens Jr.	People's Light	
2023	Meet Murasaki Shikibu Followed by Book-Signing, and Other Things	Julia Izumi	Tiny Dynamite	
2023	Abandon	James Ijames	Theatre Exile	
2024
2024	**Bonez**	**Steve H. Broadnax III**	**People's Light**	
2024	Fat Ham	James Ijames	Wilma Theater	
2024	The Lehman Trilogy	Stefano Massini	Arden Theatre Company	
2024	Torch Song Trilogy	Harvey Fierstein	1812 Productions	
2024	The Duat	Roger Q. Mason	Philadelphia Theatre Company	
2024	Citrus Andronicus	Eli Lynn	Philadelphia Artists’ Collective	
2024	The BFG	Roald Dahl	Arden Theatre Company	
2025
2025	**The Comeuppance**	**Branden Jacobs-Jenkins**	**Wilma Theater**	
2025	Rift, or White Lies	Gabriel Jason Dean	InterAct Theatre Company	
2025	Glitter in the Glass	R. Eric Thomas	Theatre Exile	
2025	Archduke	Rajiv Joseph	Wilma Theater	
2025	Nosejob	Lee Minora & Scott R. Sheppard	Lightning Rod Special	
2025	Square Go	Kieran Hurley & Gary McNair	Inis Nua	
2025	Intimate Apparel	Lynn Nottage	Arden Theatre Company	

== Multiple wins ==
7 wins

- Wilma Theater

4 wins

- Philadelphia Theatre Company
- People's Light

3 wins

- Arden Theatre Company

2 wins

- Lantern Theater Company
- InterAct Theatre Company
- Theatre Exile

== Multiple nominations ==
27 nominations

Wilma Theater

21 nominations

- Arden Theatre Company

18 nominations

- People's Light

14 nominations

- Philadelphia Theatre Company

12 nominations

- Theatre Exile

11 nominations

- InterAct Theatre Company

9 nominations

- Lantern Theater Company

4 nominations

- Simpatico Theatre
- 1812 Productions

3 nominations

- Walnut Street Theatre
- Theatre Horizon
- Pig Iron Theatre Company
- Inis Nua

2 nominations

- Delaware Theatre Company
- Azuka Theatre
