= List of Theatre Communications Group member theatres =

This is a list of theatre companies with membership of the Theatre Communications Group (TCG) in the United States.

== A ==
- 1812 Productions, Philadelphia, Pennsylvania
- The 52nd Street Project, New York
- 7 Stages, Atlanta, Georgia
- About Face Theatre, Chicago, Illinois
- Academy Theatre, Avondale Estates, Georgia
- ACT Theatre, Seattle, Washington
- The Acting Company, New York City, New York
- Actor's Express, Atlanta, Georgia
- The Actors' Gang, Culver City, California
- Actors' Guild Of Lexington, Lexington, Kentucky
- Actor's Theatre of Charlotte, Charlotte, North Carolina
- Actors Theatre of Louisville, Louisville, Kentucky
- Actors Theatre of Phoenix, Phoenix, Arizona
- Adirondack Theatre Festival, Glens Falls, New York
- The African Continuum Theatre Company, Washington, D.C.
- Alabama Shakespeare Festival, Montgomery, Alabama
- Alley Theatre, Houston, Texas
- Alliance Theatre Company, Atlanta, Georgia
- Amas Musical Theatre, Inc., New York City, New York
- American Conservatory Theater, San Francisco, California
- American Folklore Theatre, Fish Creek, Wisconsin
- American Players Theatre, Spring Green, Wisconsin
- American Repertory Theater, Cambridge, Massachusetts
- American Shakespeare Center, Staunton, Virginia
- American Stage, St. Petersburg, Florida
- American Theater Company, Chicago, Illinois
- American Theatre Company, Tulsa, Oklahoma
- Arden Theatre Company, Philadelphia, Pennsylvania
- Arena Stage, Washington, D.C.
- Arizona Theatre Company, Tucson, Arizona
- The Arkansas Arts Center Children's Theatre, Little Rock, Arkansas
- Arkansas Repertory Theatre, Little Rock, Arkansas
- Artists Repertory Theatre, Portland, Oregon
- Arts Center of Coastal Carolina, Hilton Head, South Carolina
- Arvada Center for the Arts and Humanities, Arvada, Colorado
- Asolo Theatre Company, Sarasota, Florida
- Atlanta Shakespeare Company at the Shakespeare Tavern, Atlanta, Georgia
- Atlantic Theater Company, New York City, New York
- Aurora Theatre Company, Berkeley, California

== B ==
- B Street Theatre, Sacramento, California
- Barksdale Theatre, Richmond, Virginia
- Barrington Stage Company, Pittsfield, Massachusetts
- Bay Street Theatre Festival, Inc., Sag Harbor, New York
- Berkeley Repertory Theatre, Berkeley, California
- Berkshire Theatre Festival, Stockbridge, Massachusetts
- Bilingual Foundation of the Arts, Los Angeles, California
- Blank Theatre Company, Los Angeles, California
- Bloomsburg Theatre Ensemble, Bloomsburg, Pennsylvania
- BoarsHead Theater, Lansing, Michigan
- Boise Contemporary Theater, Boise, Idaho
- Book-It Repertory Theatre, Seattle, Washington
- Borderlands Theater, Tucson, Arizona
- Boston Theatre Works, Boston, Massachusetts
- Brat Productions, Philadelphia, Pennsylvania
- Brava Theater Center, San Francisco, California
- Bristol Riverside Theatre, Bristol, Pennsylvania
- Burning Coal Theatre Company, Raleigh, North Carolina
- Bushfire Theatre, Philadelphia, Pennsylvania

== C ==
- Cal Rep, Long Beach, California
- California Shakespeare Theater, Berkeley, California
- California Theatre Center, Sunnyvale, California
- Cape Cod Theatre Project, Falmouth, Massachusetts
- Capital Repertory Theatre, Albany, New York
- Castillo Theatre, New York
- Center for New Theater at Cal Arts, Valencia, California
- Center for Puppetry Arts, Atlanta, Georgia
- Center Theatre Group, Los Angeles, California
- Centerstage, Baltimore, Maryland
- Centre Stage, Greenville's Professional Theater, Greenville, South Carolina
- Charleston Stage Company, Charleston, South Carolina
- Cherry Lane Theatre, New York City, New York
- Chicago Dramatists, Chicago, Illinois
- Chicago Shakespeare Theater, Chicago, Illinois
- Children's Theatre Company, Minneapolis, Minnesota
- Childsplay Inc., Tempe, Arizona
- The Cider Mill Playhouse, Endicott, New York
- Cincinnati Shakespeare Company, Cincinnati, Ohio
- City Garage, Santa Monica, California
- City Theatre, Miami, Florida
- City Theatre Company, Pittsburgh, Pennsylvania
- The Civilians, New York City, New York
- Clarence Brown Theatre Company, Knoxville, Tennessee
- Classic Stage Company, New York City, New York
- Classical Theatre of Harlem, New York City, New York
- The Cleveland Play House, Cleveland, Ohio
- Cleveland Public Theatre, Cleveland, Ohio
- Collaboraction, Chicago, Illinois
- Colony Theatre Company, Burbank, California
- Columbus Children's Theatre, Columbus, Ohio
- Commonweal Theatre Company, Lanesboro, Minnesota
- Company Of Fools, Hailey, Idaho
- Congo Square Theatre, Chicago, Illinois
- Connecticut Repertory Theatre, Storrs, Connecticut
- Contemporary American Theater Festival, Shepherdstown, West Virginia
- Cornerstone Theater Company, Los Angeles, California
- The Coterie Theatre, Kansas City, Missouri
- Court Theatre, Chicago, Illinois
- Creede Repertory Theatre, Creede, Colorado
- Curious Theatre Company, Denver, Colorado
- Cyrano's Theatre Company, Anchorage, Alaska

== D – F ==
- Dad's Garage Theatre Company, Atlanta, Georgia
- Dallas Children's Theater, Dallas, Texas
- Dallas Theater Center, Dallas, Texas
- Deaf West Theatre, North Hollywood, California
- Delaware Theatre Company, Wilmington, Delaware
- Dell’Arte International, Blue Lake, California
- Denver Center Theatre Company, Denver, Colorado
- Depot Theatre, Westport, New York
- Detroit Repertory Theatre, Detroit, Michigan
- Dobama Theatre, Cleveland Heights, Ohio
- Double Edge Theatre, Ashfield, Massachusetts
- East West Players, Los Angeles, California
- The Empty Space Theatre, Seattle, Washington
- Ensemble Studio Theatre, New York City, New York
- The Ensemble Theatre, Houston, Texas
- Ensemble Theatre Company, Santa Barbara, California
- Ensemble Theatre of Cincinnati, Cincinnati, Ohio
- Eugene O'Neill Theater Center, Waterford, Connecticut
- Everyman Theatre, Baltimore, Maryland
- First Stage Children's Theater, Milwaukee, Wisconsin
- Florida Stage, Manalapan, Florida
- Florida Studio Theatre, Sarasota, Florida
- Folger Theatre, Washington, D.C.
- The Foothill Theatre Co, Nevada City, California
- Ford's Theatre, Washington, D.C.
- The Foundry Theatre, New York City, New York
- Fountain Theatre, Los Angeles, California
- Free Street Programs, Chicago, Illinois

== G – J ==
- GableStage, Coral Gables, Florida
- Gainesville Theatre, Gainesville, Georgia
- GALA Hispanic Theatre, Washington, D.C.
- Gamm Theatre, Pawtucket, Rhode Island
- Gamut Theatre Group, Harrisburg, Pennsylvania
- Geffen Playhouse, Los Angeles, California
- George Street Playhouse, New Brunswick, New Jersey
- Georgia Shakespeare Festival, Atlanta, Georgia
- Geva Theatre Center, Rochester, New York
- Golden Thread Productions, San Francisco, California
- Goodman Theatre, Chicago, Illinois
- Great Lakes Theater Festival, Cleveland, Ohio
- Greenbrier Valley Theatre, Lewisburg, West Virginia
- Growing Stage Theatre For Young Audiences, Netcong, New Jersey
- Guthrie Theater, Minneapolis, Minnesota
- Hangar Theatre, Ithaca, New York
- Harlequin Productions, Olympia, Washington
- HartBeat Ensemble, Hartford, Connecticut
- Hartford Stage, Hartford, Connecticut
- Harwich Junior Theatre and Harwich Winter Theatre, West Harwich, Massachusetts
- History Theatre, Saint Paul, Minnesota
- Honolulu Theatre for Youth, Honolulu, Hawaii
- Horizon Theatre Company, Atlanta, Georgia
- Huntington Theatre Company, [[Boston, Massachusetts
- Hyde Park Theatre, Austin, Texas
- The Hypocrites, Chicago, Illinois
- Idaho Shakespeare Festival, Boise, Idaho
- Illinois Theatre Center, Park Forest, Illinois
- Illusion Theater, Minneapolis, Minnesota
- Indiana Repertory Theatre, Indianapolis, Indiana
- INTAR Hispanic American Arts Center, New York City, New York
- InterAct Theatre Company, Philadelphia, Pennsylvania
- International City Theatre, Long Beach, California
- Intiman Theatre, Seattle, Washington
- Invisible Theatre Company, Tucson, Arizona
- Irish Classical Theatre Company, Buffalo, New York
- Irondale Ensemble Project, Brooklyn, New York

== J – L ==
- Jewish Theater of New York, New York City, New York
- Jewish Theatre of the South, Dunwoody, Georgia
- The John Drew Theater, East Hampton, New York
- The Jungle Theater, Minneapolis, Minnesota
- Kansas City Repertory Theatre, Kansas City, Missouri
- The Kavinoky Theatre, Buffalo, New York]]
- Kennedy Center - Youth And Family Programs, Arlington, Virginia
- Kentucky Repertory Theatre, Horse Cave, Kentucky
- Kentucky Shakespeare Festival, Louisville, Kentucky
- Kitchen Dog Theater, Dallas, Texas
- Kitchen Theatre Company, Ithaca, New York
- Know Theatre of Cincinnati, Cincinnati, Ohio
- L.A. Theatre Works, Venice, California
- La Jolla Playhouse, La Jolla, California
- La MaMa Experimental Theatre, New York City, New York
- LAByrinth Theater Company, New York City, New York
- Laguna Playhouse, Laguna Beach, California
- Lantern Theater Company, Philadelphia, Pennsylvania
- Lark Play Development Center, New York City, New York
- Lexington Children's Theatre, Lexington, KY
- Lincoln Center Theater, New York City, New York
- Long Wharf Theatre, New Haven, Connecticut
- Lookingglass Theatre Company, Chicago, Illinois
- Los Angeles Women's Shakespeare Company, Los Angeles, California
- Lost Nation Theater, Montpelier, Vermont
- The Lyric Stage Company of Boston, Boston, Massachusetts

== M ==
- Ma-Yi Theater Company, New York City, New York
- Mabou Mines, New York City, New York
- Mad River Theater Works, West Liberty, Ohio
- Madison Repertory Theatre, Madison, Wisconsin
- Magic Theatre, Inc., San Francisco, California
- Main Street Theater, Houston, Texas
- Manhattan Ensemble Theater, New York City, New York
- Manhattan Theatre Club, New York City, New York
- Marin Shakespeare Company, San Rafael, California
- Marin Theatre Company, Mill Valley, California
- Maryland Ensemble Theatre, Frederick, Maryland
- McCarter Theatre Center, Princeton, New Jersey
- Meadow Brook Theatre, Rochester, Michigan
- Melting Pot Theatre Company, New York City, New York
- Merrimack Repertory, Lowell, Massachusetts
- Merry Go-Round Playhouse, Auburn, New York
- Metro Theater Company, St. Louis, Missouri
- Milwaukee Chamber Theatre, Milwaukee, Wisconsin
- Milwaukee Repertory Theater, Milwaukee, Wisconsin
- Milwaukee Shakespeare Company, Milwaukee, Wisconsin
- Mint Theater Company, New York City, New York
- Miracle Theatre Group, Portland, Oregon
- Mirror Repertory Company, New York City, New York
- Mixed Blood Theatre Company, Minneapolis, Minnesota
- Montana Repertory Theatre, Missoula, Montana
- Montgomery Theater, Souderton, Pennsylvania
- Moving Arts, Los Angeles, California
- Mu Performing Arts, Minneapolis, Minnesota
- Mum Puppettheatre, Philadelphia, Pennsylvania
- My Fair Heathen Productions, Brooklyn, New York

== N – O ==
- Native Voices at the Autry, Los Angeles, California
- Nautilus Music-Theater, Saint Paul, Minnesota
- Nebraska Repertory Theatre, Lincoln, Nebraska
- Nevada Shakespeare Company, Reno, Nevada
- New American Theater, Rockford, Illinois
- New Conservatory Theatre Center, San Francisco, California
- New Dramatists, New York
- New Federal Theatre, Inc., New York City, New York
- New Georges, New York City, New York
- New Ground Theatre, Davenport, Iowa
- The New Harmony Theatre, Evansville, Indiana
- New Jersey Repertory Company, Long Branch, New Jersey
- The New Orleans Shakespeare Festival at Tulane, New Orleans, Louisiana
- New Paradise Laboratories, Philadelphia, Pennsylvania
- New Professional Theatre, New York City, New York
- New Repertory Theatre, Watertown, Massachusetts
- New Stage Theatre, Jackson, Mississippi
- New Theatre, Coral Gables, Florida
- New World Theater, Amherst, Massachusetts
- New York State Theatre, Troy, New York
- New York Theatre Workshop, New York City, New York
- Next Act Theatre, Milwaukee, Wisconsin
- The Next Theatre Company, Evanston, Illinois
- A Noise Within, Glendale, California
- North Carolina Stage Company, Asheville, North Carolina
- North Coast Repertory, Solana Beach, California
- North Star Theatre, Mandeville, Louisiana
- Northern Stage, White River Junction, Vermont
- Northlight Theatre, Skokie, Illinois
- Northwest Children's Theater and School, Portland, Oregon
- Northwest Classical Theatre Company, Portland, Oregon
- Odyssey Theatre Ensemble, Los Angeles, California
- The Old Globe, San Diego, California
- Olney Theatre Center, Olney, Maryland
- Omaha Theater Company For Young People, Omaha, Nebraska
- Ontological-Hysteric Theater, New York City, New York
- The Open Eye Theater, Margaretville, New York
- Open Stage Of Harrisburg, Harrisburg, Pennsylvania
- OpenStage Theatre and Company, Fort Collins, Colorado
- Oregon Children's Theatre, Portland, Oregon
- Oregon Contemporary Theatre, Eugene, Oregon
- Oregon Shakespeare Festival, Ashland, Oregon
- Orlando Shakespeare Theater, Orlando, Florida
- Out Of Hand Theater, Atlanta, Georgia

== P ==
- Palm Beach Dramaworks, West Palm Beach, Florida
- Pan Asian Repertory Theatre, New York
- Pangea World Theater, Minneapolis, Minnesota
- Paper Mill Playhouse, Millburn, New Jersey
- Pasadena Playhouse, Pasadena, California
- Passage Theatre Company, Trenton, New Jersey
- PCPA Theaterfest, Santa Maria, California
- Pegasus Players Theatre, Chicago, Illinois
- Peninsula Players Theatre, Fish Creek, Wisconsin
- Pennsylvania Shakespeare Festival, Center Valley, Pennsylvania
- Penobscot Theatre Company, Bangor, Maine
- Penumbra Theatre Company, Saint Paul, Minnesota
- The People's Light And Theatre Company, Malvern, Pennsylvania
- Performance Network, Ann Arbor, Michigan
- Perishable Theatre, Providence, Rhode Island
- Perseverance Theatre, Douglas, Alaska
- Peterborough Players, Peterborough, New Hampshire
- The Philadelphia Shakespeare Festival, Philadelphia, Pennsylvania
- Philadelphia Theatre Company, Philadelphia, Pennsylvania
- Phoenix Theatre, Phoenix, Arizona
- Phoenix Theatre, Inc., Indianapolis, Indiana
- Pick Up Performance Company, New York City, New York
- Pig Iron Theatre Company, Philadelphia, Pennsylvania
- Pillsbury House Theatre, Minneapolis, Minnesota
- Ping Chong And Company, New York City, New York
- Pioneer Theatre Company, Salt Lake City, Utah
- Pittsburgh Irish and Classical Theatre, Pittsburgh, Pennsylvania
- Pittsburgh Public Theater, Pittsburgh, Pennsylvania
- Piven Theatre Workshop, Evanston, Illinois
- PlayGround, San Francisco, California
- Playhouse on the Square, Memphis, Tennessee
- Playhouse West, Walnut Creek, California
- PlayMakers Repertory Company, Chapel Hill, North Carolina
- The Playwrights' Center, Minneapolis, Minnesota
- Playwrights Horizons, New York City, New York
- Playwrights Theatre Of New Jersey, Madison, New Jersey
- Plowshares Theatre Co, Detroit, Michigan
- Portland Center Stage, Portland, Oregon
- Portland Stage Company, Portland, Maine
- Pregones Theater, Bronx, New York
- Primary Stages Theater, New York City, New York
- ProArts Collective of Austin, Austin, Texas
- Profile Theatre Project, Portland, Oregon
- The Public Theatre, Auburn, Maine
- The Public Theater, New York City, New York
- PushPush Theater, Decatur, Georgia

== R – S ==
- Red Barn Theatre, Key West, Florida
- Redmoon Theater, Chicago, Illinois
- Renaissance Theaterworks, Milwaukee, Wisconsin
- The Repertory Theatre of St. Louis, St. Louis, Missouri
- River Stage, Sacramento, California
- Riverlight And Co, Battle Creek, Michigan
- Riverside Theatre, Iowa City, Iowa
- Roadside Theater, Norton, Virginia
- Round House Theatre, Bethesda, Maryland
- Roundabout Theatre Company, New York
- Roxy Regional Theatre, Clarksville, Tennessee
- Rude Mechanicals, Austin, Texas
- Saint Michael's Playhouse, Colchester, Vermont
- The Salt Lake Acting Company, Salt Lake City, Utah
- Salvage Vanguard Theater, Austin, Texas
- San Diego Repertory, San Diego, California
- San Jose Repertory Theatre, San Jose, California
- Seattle Children's Theatre, Seattle, Washington
- Seattle Public Theater, Seattle, Washington
- Seattle Repertory Theatre, Seattle, Washington
- Seattle Shakespeare Company, Seattle, Washington
- Second Stage Theatre, New York City, New York
- Shakespeare & Company, Lenox, Massachusetts
- Shakespeare Santa Cruz, Santa Cruz, California
- Shakespeare Theatre Company, Washington, D.C.
- The Shakespeare Theatre of New Jersey, Madison, New Jersey
- Shattered Globe Theatre, Chicago, Illinois
- Shotgun Players, Berkeley, California
- Sierra Repertory Theatre, Sonora, California
- Signature Theatre, Arlington, Virginia
- Signature Theatre Company, New York City, New York
- SITI Company, New York City, New York
- Society Hill Playhouse, Philadelphia, Pennsylvania
- Solano College Theatre, Fairfield, California
- South Coast Repertory, Costa Mesa, California
- South Coast Theatre Company, New Bedford, Massachusetts
- Southern Rep, New Orleans, Louisiana
- Southwest Ensemble Theatre, Phoenix, Arizona
- Southwest Shakespeare Company, Mesa, Arizona
- Speakeasy Stage Company, Boston, Massachusetts
- St Louis Black Repertory Company, St. Louis, Missouri
- Stage One: The Louisville Children's Theatre, Inc., Louisville, Kentucky
- Stages Repertory Theatre, Houston, Texas
- Stages Theatre Center, Los Angeles, California
- Stages Theatre Company, Hopkins, Minnesota
- StageWorks/Hudson, Hudson, New York
- Stark Raving Theatre, Portland, Oregon
- State Theater Company, Austin, Texas
- Steppenwolf Theatre Company, Chicago, Illinois
- The Studio Theatre, Washington, D.C.
- The Sugan Theatre Company, Cambridge, Massachusetts
- Sundance Theatre, Beverly Hills, California
- Swine Palace, Baton Rouge, Louisiana
- Synchronicity Performance Group, Atlanta, Georgia
- Syracuse Stage, Syracuse, New York

== T – U ==
- TADA!, New York
- Talking Band, New York City, New York
- Taproot Theatre Company, Seattle, Washington
- Target Margin Theater, Brooklyn, New York
- Teatro del Pueblo, Saint Paul, Minnesota
- Teatro Vision de San Jose, San Jose, California
- Teatro Vista, Chicago, Illinois
- Ten Thousand Things Theater Company, Minneapolis, Minnesota
- Tennessee Repertory Theatre, Nashville, Tennessee
- Thalía Spanish Theatre, Long Island City, New York
- Theater Alliance, Washington, D.C.
- The Theater at Monmouth, Monmouth, Maine
- Theater By the Blind, New York City, New York
- Theater for the New City, New York City, New York
- Theater Grottesco, Santa Fe, New Mexico
- Theater J, Washington, D.C.
- Theater of the First Amendment, Fairfax, Virginia
- Theater on Main, Oconomowoc, Wisconsin
- Theater Previews at Duke, Durham, North Carolina
- The Theater Project, Cranford, New Jersey
- Theatre Aspen, Aspen, Colorado
- Theatre de la Jeune Lune, Minneapolis, Minnesota
- Theatre For A New Audience, New York City, New York
- Theatre Project, Baltimore, Maryland
- Theatre West, Los Angeles, California
- TheatreSquared, Fayetteville, Arkansas
- Theatreworks, Palo Alto, California
- Theatrical Outfit, Atlanta, Georgia
- Touchstone Theatre, Bethlehem, Pennsylvania
- Traveling Jewish Theatre, San Francisco, California
- Triad Stage, Greensboro, North Carolina
- Tricklock Theatre Company, Albuquerque, New Mexico
- Trinity Repertory Company, Providence, Rhode Island
- True Colors Theatre Company, Atlanta, Georgia
- Trustus Theatre, Columbia, South Carolina
- Two River Theater Company, Red Bank, New Jersey
- Undermain Theatre, Dallas, Texas
- Unicorn Theatre, Kansas City, Missouri
- Urban Stages, New York
- Utah Shakespearean Festival, Cedar City, Utah

== V – Z ==
- Valley Youth Theatre, Phoenix, Arizona
- Vermont Stage Company, Burlington, Vermont
- Victory Gardens Theater, Chicago, Illinois
- Vineyard Playhouse, Vineyard Haven, Massachusetts
- Vineyard Theatre, New York
- Virginia Stage Company, Norfolk, Virginia
- Vital Theatre Company, New York
- Voices of the South, Memphis, Tennessee
- Walden Theatre, Louisville, Kentucky
- The Warehouse Theatre, Greenville, South Carolina
- WaterTower Theatre, Addison, Texas
- Wellfleet Harbor Actors Theater, Wellfleet, Massachusetts
- West Coast Ensemble, Los Angeles, California
- The Western Stage, Salinas, California
- Weston Playhouse, Weston, Vermont
- Westport Country Playhouse, Westport, Connecticut
- Wheelock Family Theatre, Boston, Massachusetts
- William Inge Center for the Arts, Independence, Kansas
- Williamstown Theatre Festival, Williamstown, Massachusetts
- The Wilma Theater, Philadelphia, Pennsylvania
- Wing-It Productions, Seattle, Washington
- Women's Project & Productions, New York
- Woolly Mammoth Theatre Company, Washington, D.C.
- The Wooster Group, New York City, New York
- Working Classroom, Albuquerque, New Mexico
- The Working Theater, New York City, New York
- Writers' Theatre, Glencoe, Illinois
- Yale Repertory Theatre, New Haven, Connecticut
- Young Playwrights' Theater, Washington, D.C.
- Youth Ensemble of Atlanta, Atlanta, Georgia
- The Z Space Studio, San Francisco, California
- Zachary Scott Theatre Center, Austin, Texas

== See also ==
- List of LORT member theatres
