= Barrymore Awards =

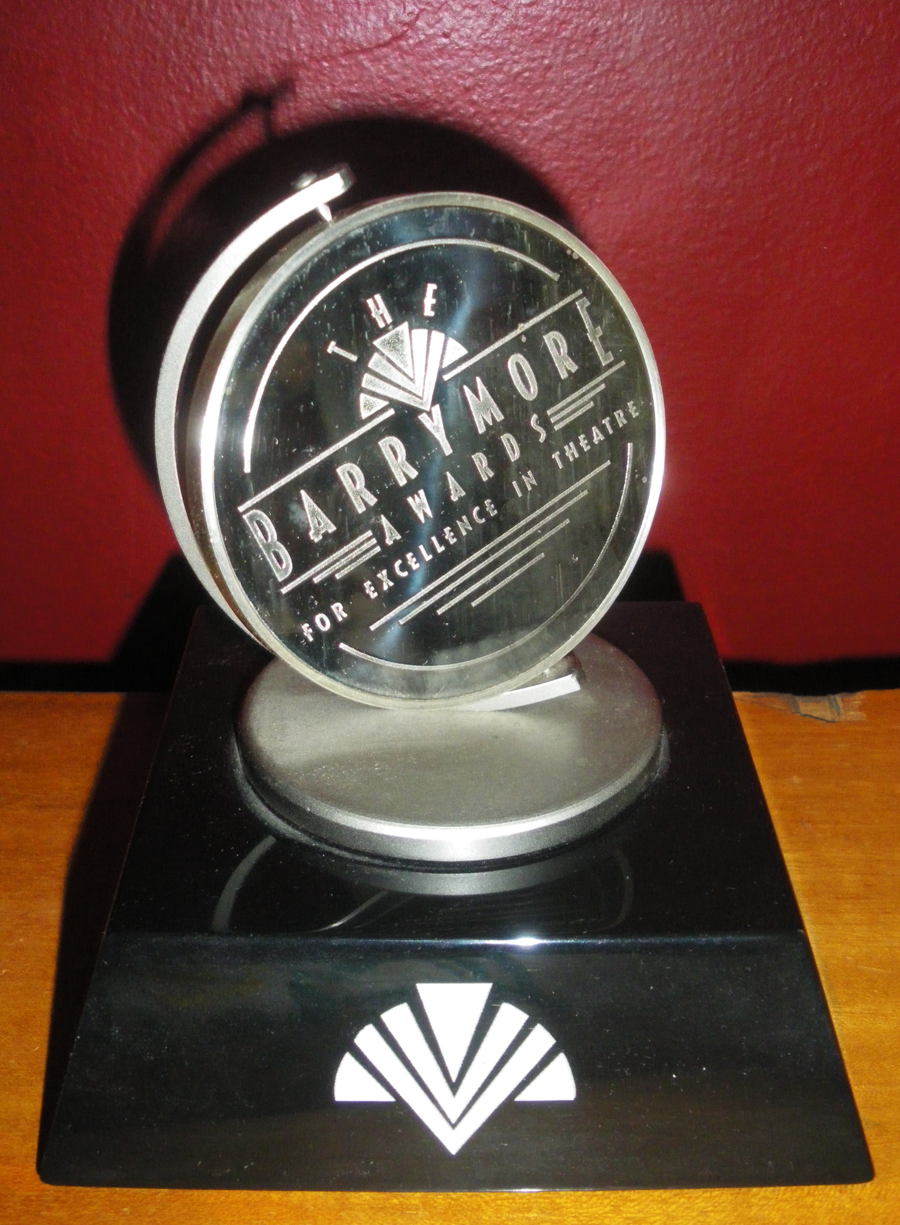
The Barrymore Award

The Barrymore Awards for Excellence in Theatre is an annual, nationally-recognized award program that is sponsored by Theatre Philadelphia for professional theater productions in the Greater Philadelphia area. Each season culminates with an awards ceremony.

The Barrymore Awards was founded by the Performing Arts League of Philadelphia (PALP) in 1994 and was named after the Barrymore family. PALP was renamed the Theatre Alliance of Greater Philadelphia in 1997 and presided over the awards until 2012. Theatre Philadelphia has handled the awards since 2012.

== Award categories ==
In 2018, Theatre Philadelphia merged the actor and actress performance categories, eliminating gender from consideration.

Awards are given in the following categories:

- Outstanding Overall Production of a Play
- Outstanding Direction of a Play
- Outstanding Ensemble in a Play
- Outstanding Leading Performance in a Play
- Outstanding Supporting Performance in a Play
- Outstanding Movement/Choreography in a Play
- Outstanding Overall Production of a Musical
- Outstanding Direction of a Musical
- Outstanding Leading Performance in a Musical
- Outstanding Supporting Performance in a Musical
- Outstanding Choreography/Movement in a Musical
- Outstanding Music Direction
- Outstanding Ensemble in a Musical
- Outstanding Original Production
- Outstanding Outdoor Production
- Outstanding Scenic Design
- Outstanding Costume Design
- Outstanding Lighting Design
- Outstanding Media Design
- Outstanding Sound Design
- Outstanding Original Music
- The Philadelphia Award for Social Insight

== History ==
=== Theatre Alliance of Greater Philadelphia (1994–2012) ===
Named in honor of the famed American theatrical family, the Barrymore family, the Barrymore Awards for Excellence in Theatre have served as Philadelphia's professional theatre awards program since the 1994–1995 season. It was founded by the Performing Arts League of Philadelphia (PALP) in September 1994. PALP was renamed the Theatre Alliance of Greater Philadelphia in 1997. The group used the Helen Hayes Awards (Washington, D.C.) and Joseph Jefferson Awards (Chicago) as guidelines in devising the structure of the Barrymore Awards. The program cost $95,000 in its first year. In 1995, there were 40 members of the nominating committee.

The awards ceremony was held at the Annenberg Center for the Performing Arts for the first two years in 1995 and 1996, the Walnut Street Theatre in 1997 and 1998. and the Irvine Auditorium starting in 1999. The awards ceremony moved to the Independence Seaport Museum in 2001, and it returned to the Annenberg Center in 2002. The ceremony took place at the Academy of Music in 2004, and the Merriam Theater in 2005. The Barrymore Awards moved to Wanamaker's for the 2007 ceremony. The ceremony was held at the Walnut Street Theatre in 2009 in honor of the theatre's 200th season.

In December 1999, the Walnut Street Theatre, the largest theatre in the region, announced it would withdraw from consideration from the Barrymore Awards, in protest for one of their shows being deemed ineligible for an award. By January 2000, the Walnut agreed to rejoin after the Alliance of Greater Philadelphia instituted an appeals process in their system. The appeals process was removed for the 2000–2001 season, and the Walnut again withdrew from consideration from 2003 through 2006, citing a perceived bias against the theatre by nominators. The Media Theatre also withdrew during the 2002–2003 season, its first season submitting shows for consideration, but returned for the 2002–2003 season. The Walnut Street Theatre began submitting again for consideration in 2007.

The Theatre Alliance of Greater Philadelphia folded on June 30, 2012, due to funding issues. It still announced nominations for the Barrymore Awards for the 2011–2012 season in August 2012. Many of the 2011–2012 awards were announced via email in September, with the top three awards (the lifetime achievement award, Brown Martin Philadelphia Award, and F. Otto Haas Award) given at the Kimmel Center for the Performing Arts, at an event called "Theatre Philadelphia: A Celebration" in October 2012.

=== Theatre Philadelphia (2013–present) ===
By November 2013, 11 theatre administrators and artistic directors formed Theatre Philadelphia to replace the Theatre Alliance of Greater Philadelphia. The awards with cash prizes attached to them were handed out for the 2012–2013 season, with category-specific awards resuming for the 2013–2014 season.

The first full awards ceremony under Theatre Philadelphia in 2014 was held at the Merriam Theater. The awards moved to the Bok Building for 2018. The Media Theatre and Walnut Street Theatre did not submit for consideration starting with the 2014 awards. Media returned and submitted a show for the 2017–2018 season.

In June 2018, Theatre Philadelphia announced the removal of gender identifiers from performance categories. In 2018, the awards included an adjudication of twenty-four categories, including five cash awards totaling up to $118,000 for artists and organizations each year.

Due to the COVID-19 pandemic, a Barrymore Awards ceremony was not held from 2020 to 2022. It returned in 2023.

== Notable awardees ==
=== Outstanding Production of a New Play ===
- 1995: Master Class (Philadelphia Theatre Company, Terrence McNally)
- 1999: The Chosen (Arden Theatre Company)
- 2002: Yellowman (Wilma Theater)
- 2006: Opus (Arden Theatre Company, Michael Hollinger)

=== Outstanding Direction of a Play ===
- 1995: Blanka Zizka (Road, Wilma Theater)
- 1998: Aaron Posner (A Midsummer Night's Dream, Arden Theatre Company)
- 2000: Blanka Zizka (The Invention of Love, Wilma Theater)
- 2004: Blanka Zizka (Jesus Hopped the 'A' Train, Wilma Theater)
- 2005: Maria Mileaf (The Story, Philadelphia Theatre Company)
- 2006: Terrence J. Nolen (Opus, Arden Theatre Company)
- 2009: Terrence J. Nolen (Something Intangible, Arden Theatre Company)
- 2010: Anne Kauffman (Becky Shaw, Wilma Theater)
- 2011: Blanka Zizka (In the Next Room (or The Vibrator Play), Wilma Theater)
- 2012: Anne Kauffman (Body Awareness, Wilma Theater)
- 2014: James Ijames (The Brothers Size, Simpatico Theatre Project)
- 2017: Blanka Zizka (When the Rain Stops Falling, Wilma Theater)
- 2019: James Ijames (Gem of the Ocean, Arden Theatre Company)

=== Outstanding Direction of a Musical ===
- 1997: Blanka Zizka (Avenue X, Wilma Theater)
- 1998: Patricia Birch (Band in Berlin, American Music Theater Festival)
- 1999: Tina Landau (Floyd Collins, Prince Music Theater)
- 2001: Terrence J. Nolen (The Baker's Wife, Arden Theatre Company)
- 2002: Peter M. Donohue (Chicago, Villanova Theatre)
- 2003: Rebecca Taichman (Green Violin, Prince Music Theater)
- 2004: Tazewell Thompson (Constant Star, Delaware Theatre Company)
- 2005: Terrence J. Nolen (Sweeney Todd: The Demon Barber of Fleet Street, Arden Theatre Company)
- 2006: Terrence J. Nolen (Winesburg, Ohio, Arden Theatre Company)
- 2008: Terrence J. Nolen (Assassins, Arden Theatre Company)
- 2011: Matthew Decker (The 25th Annual Putnam County Spelling Bee, Theatre Horizon)
- 2015: Matthew Decker (Into the Woods, Theatre Horizon)
- 2016: Matthew Decker (The Stinky Cheese Man and Other Fairly Stupid Tales, Arden Theatre Company)
- 2018: Terrence J. Nolen (Fun Home, Arden Theatre Company)

=== Outstanding Leading Performance in a Play ===
==== Leading Actor (1995–2017) ====
- 1998: Jarlath Conroy (The Steward of Christendom, Lantern Theater Company)
- 1999: Roger Guenveur Smith (A Huey P. Newton Story, Freedom Repertory Theatre/Painted Bride Art Center)
- 2002: Douglas Campbell (The Dresser, Bristol Riverside Theatre)
- 2005: Bill Irwin (Trumbo, Philadelphia Theatre Company)
- 2010: Jeremy Bobb (Becky Shaw, Wilma Theater)
- 2012: Richard Poe (The Outgoing Tide, Philadelphia Theatre Company)

==== Leading Actress (1995–2017) ====
- 1995: Zoe Caldwell (Master Class, Philadelphia Theatre Company)
- 1996: Scotty Bloch (Three Viewings, Philadelphia Theatre Company)
- 1999: Alma Cuervo (The Beauty Queen of Leenane, Philadelphia Theatre Company)
- 2002: Dael Orlandersmith (Yellowman, Wilma Theater)
- 2004: Lynn Redgrave (Collected Stories, Contemporary Stage Company)
- 2011: Anna Deavere Smith (Let Me Down Easy, Philadelphia Theatre Company)

=== Outstanding Leading Performance in a Musical ===
==== Leading Actor (1995–2017) ====
- 1995: Denis Lawson (Lust, Walnut Street Theatre)
- 2001: Brad Little (Evita, Bristol Riverside Theatre)
- 2003: Raúl Esparza (Green Violin, Prince Music Theater)
- 2007: Rob McClure (The Bomb-itty of Errors, 11th Hour Theatre Company)
- 2008: Hugh Panaro (Les Misérables, Walnut Street Theatre)
- 2010: Mark Jacoby (Fiddler on the Roof, Walnut Street Theatre)
- 2011: Rob McClure (The Flea and the Professor, Arden Theatre Company)
- 2012: Rodney Hicks (The Scottsboro Boys, Philadelphia Theatre Company)

==== Leading Actress (1995–2017) ====
- 1995: Alison Fraser (Gunmetal Blues, Wilma Theater)
- 1999: Ann Crumb (Bed and Sofa, Wilma Theater)
- 2003: Christine Andreas (Pal Joey, Prince Music Theater)
- 2006: Rachel deBenedet (Adrift in Macao, Philadelphia Theatre Company)
- 2009: Jennie Eisenhower (Forbidden Broadway's Greatest Hits, Walnut Street Theatre)

==== Leading Performance (2018–present) ====
- 2018: Dulé Hill (Lights Out: Nat "King" Cole, People's Light and Theatre Company)

=== Outstanding Supporting Performance in a Play ===
==== Supporting Actor (1995–2017) ====
- 1996: Edward Hibbert (Love! Valour! Compassion!, Philadelphia Theatre Company)
- 2002: Tobias Segal (Equus, Mum Puppettheatre)
- 2004: John Douglas Thompson (Jesus Hopped the 'A' Train, Wilma Theater)
- 2011: James Ijames (Superior Donuts, Arden Theatre Company)
- 2012: James Ijames (Angels in America, Part One: Millennium Approaches, Wilma Theater)

==== Supporting Actress (1995–2017) ====
- 1998: Maggie Siff (Ghosts, Lantern Theater Company)
- 2005: Jayne Houdyshell (The Clean House, Wilma Theater)
- 2010: Brooke Bloom (Becky Shaw, Wilma Theater)

==== Supporting Performance (2018–present) ====
- 2019: Brian Anthony Wilson (Gem of the Ocean, Arden Theatre Company)

=== Outstanding Supporting Performance in a Musical ===
==== Supporting Actor (1995–2017) ====
- 1996: Stephen DeRosa (Falsettos, Arden Theatre Company)
- 2000: Joel Blum (The Tin Pan Alley Rag, Wilma Theater)
- 2009: Forrest McClendon (Avenue X, 11th Hour Theatre Company)
- 2012: Forrest McClendon (The Scottsboro Boys, Philadelphia Theatre Company)

==== Supporting Actress (1995–2017) ====
- 1996: Taina Elg (Cabaret, Walnut Street Theatre)
- 2004: Jennie Eisenhower (The Wild Party, Media Theatre)
- 2006: Michele Ragusa (Adrift in Macao, Philadelphia Theatre Company)
- 2007: Dee Hoty (Stormy Weather, Imagining Lena Horne, Prince Music Theater)

==== Supporting Performance (2018–present) ====
- 2018: Daniel J. Watts (Lights Out: Nat "King" Cole, People's Light and Theatre Company)

=== Outstanding Set Design ===
- 2005: Mimi Lien (Outrage, Wilma Theater)
- 2008: Beowulf Boritt (Art, Delaware Theatre Company)

=== Outstanding Original Music ===
- 1998: Larry Gatlin (Texas Flyer, Bristol Riverside Theatre)
- 2003: Frank London (Green Violin, Prince Music Theater)
- 2004: Cy Coleman (The Great Ostrovsky, Prince Music Theater)
- 2005: David Friedman (Chasing Nicolette, Prince Music Theater)

=== Outstanding Lighting Design ===
- 2001: Howell Binkley (3hree, Prince Music Theater)

=== Outstanding Costume Design ===
- 2000: Theoni V. Aldredge (La Cage aux Folles, Walnut Street Theatre)
- 2011: Oana Botez (In the Next Room (or The Vibrator Play, Wilma Theater)

=== Outstanding Choreography/Movement ===
- 2003: David Dorfman (Green Violin, Prince Music Theater)
- 2009: Christopher Gattelli (Altar Boyz, Bristol Riverside Theatre)
- 2010: Tony Stetson (The Elaborate Entrance of Chad Deity, InterAct Theatre Company)

=== F. Otto Haas Award ===
The F. Otto Haas Award, named after philanthropist F. Otto Haas, who died in 1994, was an annual honor acknowledging an emerging theatre artist for artistic excellence and promise. It was given along with a $10,000 prize until 2014, when it became a $15,000 award. Due to funding issues, the award was discontinued after 2023.

- 1996: Michael Hollinger, playwright
- 2011: James Ijames

=== Distinguished Artist in the Theater ===
- 2011: Terrence McNally

== See also ==
- Cushman Award, also presented during the Barrymore ceremony since 1995
