= James Ijames =

American playwright

- Born: 1981 (age 44–45); Bessemer City, North Carolina, U.S.
- Education: Morehouse College (BA); Temple University (MFA)
- Occupations: Playwright, professor
- Writing career
- Notable awards: Pulitzer Prize for Drama; Whiting Award

James Ijames (/aɪmz/) (born 1980) is an American playwright originally from Bessemer City, North Carolina. His play Fat Ham, adapted from Hamlet, won the Pulitzer Prize for Drama. He is a professor at Columbia University and former co-artistic director of the Wilma Theater in Philadelphia.

== Early life ==
Ijames went to a church group of St. James Missionary Baptist Church while he was a child and it was deeply ingrained as part of his adolescence.

Ijames started writing when he was thirteen because of his Grandmother. He cites having a television in his bedroom as a child to be the reason he leaned towards playwriting rather than becoming a novelist. He never thought that playwriting could be a career for him because his professor at Morehouse College told him it would be incredibly difficult to get into an MFA Playwriting program.

Ijames grew up in Bessemer City, North Carolina. While there he was heavily involved in performing and the arts, specifically choir as he thought that would be his future.

Ijames received his BA in Drama from Morehouse College in Atlanta, Georgia. When he first started college, his concentration was in Choral Music Conducting. However, he soon discovered he hated it. His voice teacher at the time told Ijames about an audition for Once on This Island over at Clark Atlanta and after that he changed to a theater major.

After his getting his BA, Ijames transferred to Temple University in Philadelphia, Pennsylvania where he earned his MFA in Acting. He then went on to start his career in Philadelphia where he remains today.

== Career ==
After graduating from Temple, Ijames performed in plays in Philadelphia, including at the Arden Theatre Company, Philadelphia Theatre Company, People's Light, and The Wilma Theater.

He began writing The Most Spectacularly Lamentable Trial of Miz Martha Washington in 2012 while performing in a production of Angels in America at The Wilma.

Ijames is a founding member of Orbiter 3, Philadelphia's first playwright producing collective.

Ijames' work has been produced by Flashpoint Theater Company, Orbiter 3, Theatre Horizon, The National Black Theatre, Ally Theatre Company (Washington, DC), and others.

Kill Move Paradise had its premiere at the National Black Theatre in 2017. Ben Brantley of The New York Times noted that "Mr. Ijames's play has no sense of an ending, or of resolution. It takes place in a nightmare of history, in which events are repeated, fugue-like, into eternity." He compared Ijames' work to the early works of Suzan-Lori Parks.

White was produced at the Theatre Horizon. In his review, Jim Rutter of the Philadelphia Inquirer remarked on the play's ending and how it "adds a surreal twist by driving home Ijames' exploration of black women's exploitation by feminism, by contemporary culture and white women."

Moon Man Walk was produced by Orbiter 3 in Philadelphia. Bryan Buttler writing for Philadelphia Magazine praised the quality of the new work, stating "there's a lot of talk about "new work" in theater and opera in this town, but Moon Man Walk provides the kind of artistic quality that the Philadelphia arts community needs to not only achieve with new works but invest in."

From 2020 to 2023, Ijames was co-artistic director of The Wilma.

His adaptation of Hamlet, titled Fat Ham, won the Pulitzer Prize for Drama in 2022 after premiering as a "digital production" at the Wilma in 2021. A second production ran at The Public Theater during the summer of 2022, before opening on Broadway in April 2023.

Ijames directed King Hedley II by August Wilson at the Arden in 2025.

In 2025, Ijames left Villanova University, where he began teaching in the 2010s, to teach playwriting at Columbia University.

== Personal life ==
Ijames is gay. He is married to Joel Witter.

Ijames owns a house on 4th and Wolf in Philadelphia, Pennsylvania. He bought it in 2016.

== Plays ==
- The Threshing Floor
- The Most Spectacularly Lamentable Trial of Miz Martha Washington (Flashpoint Theater Company, Philadelphia, Pennsylvania)
- Moon Man Walk (Orbiter 3 Playwrights Collective, 2015)
- White (PlayPenn New Play Conference, Theatre Horizon, Philadelphia, Pennsylvania)
- Matter Out of Place (InterAct Theater Company and Available Light Theater, Columbus, Ohio)
- History of Walking (Theatre Exile, Philadelphia, Pennsylvania)
- Kill Move Paradise (National Black Theatre, 2017)
- Youth
- TJ Loves Sally 4 Ever (Ally Theatre Company, 2020)
- Fat Ham (Wilma Theater, 2021)
- Reverie (Azuka Theatre, 2022)
- Abandon (NEA supported, Theatre Exile, Philadelphia, Pennsylvania)
- Good Bones (Commissioned by Studio Theatre, Washington, D.C., 2023)
- Wilderness Generation (2026)

== Awards and nominations ==
Year	Award	Category	Work	Result	Ref.
2011	F. Otto Haas Award	Emerging Artist		Won	
2011	Barrymore Award	Outstanding Supporting Actor in a Play	Superior Donuts	Won	
2012	Barrymore Award	Outstanding Supporting Actor in a Play	Angels in America, Part One: Millennium Approaches	Won	
2014	Barrymore Award	Outstanding Direction of a Play	The Brothers Size	Won	
2015	Terrence McNally Award	New Play	White	Won	
2015	Pew Fellowship in the Arts	Playwriting		Won	
2017	Whiting Award	Drama		Won	
2018	Kesselring Prize	Playwriting	Miz Martha	Honorable mention	
2022	Pulitzer Prize	Drama	Fat Ham	Won	
2023	Tony Award	Best Play	Fat Ham	Nominated	
2024	Lambda Literary Award	Drama	Fat Ham	Won	
