= Terrence J. Nolen =

American tgeatre director (born 20th century)

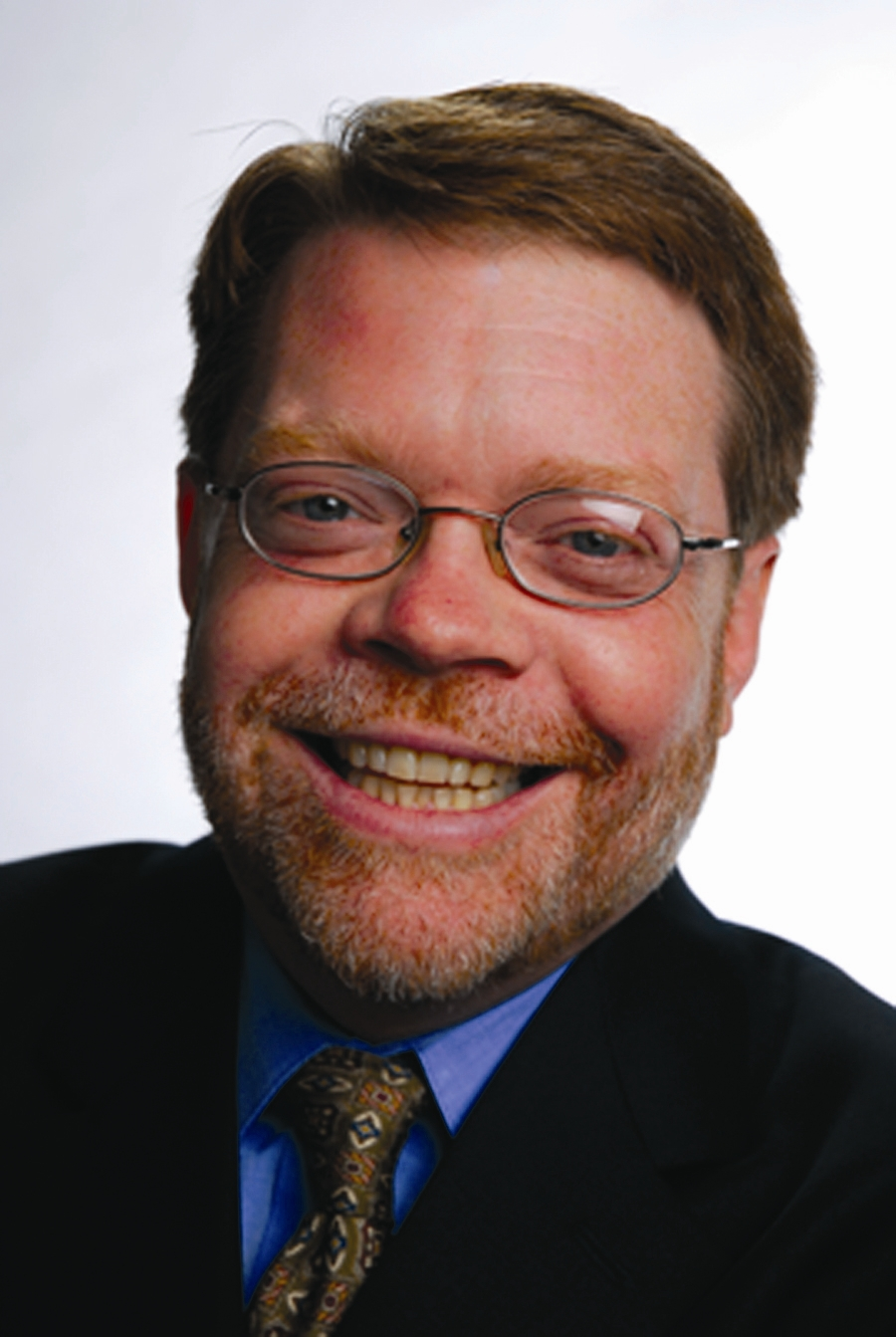
Nolen in 2006

Terrence Nolen (born 20th century), usually called Terry Nolen, is an American theater director and the producing artistic director of the Arden Theatre Company, a professional regional-theatre company located in Philadelphia, Pennsylvania.

== Career ==
In 1988, Nolen co-founded the Arden Theatre Company with Amy Murphy and Aaron Posner. He has helped the Arden receive 182 Barrymore Award nominations and win 35 awards.

=== Awards ===
He won the 2006 Barrymore Award for best director for Opus and Winesberg, Ohio, the Harold Prince Award for Outstanding Direction of a Musical for Sweeney Todd: The Demon Barber of Fleet Street in 2005, and the Harold Prince Award for Outstanding Direction of a Musical for The Baker's Wife in 2001.
