= League of Resident Theatres =

American professional theater association

- Formation: 18 March 1966; 60 years ago
- Type: Theater association
- Location: United States
- Official language: English
- Website: www.lort.org

The League of Resident Theatres (LORT) is a collective bargaining association in the United States with over 83 non-profit theatre members. LORT serves as a way for member resident theaters, also called regional theaters, to bargain collectively on behalf of theater management with Actors' Equity Association, the Stage Directors and Choreographers Society, and United Scenic Artists.

LORT was formed by the largest of regional theatres to negotiate with theater unions. Membership is restricted to US theatres considered as "non-profit" by the Internal Revenue Service.

== History ==
The League of Resident Theatres was formally established on March 18, 1966 by Peter Zeisler, managing director of the Minnesota Theatre Company (a.k.a. the Guthrie Theater), Thomas Fichandler, general manager of D.C.'s Arena Stage, and Morris Kaplan, an attorney. Peter Zeisler was appointed the first president, with Thomas Finchandler as vice president and William Bushnell, manager of Baltimore's Center Stage, as secretary. There were 26 member theaters at the organization's founding. Until then resident theater troupes negotiated individual contracts with Equity; most of them used modifications of commercial theater contracts. In some instances the theaters operated under the terms of Equity's new stock contract, however, resident theater managers have long felt burdened by what they call Equity's "one production" type of contract used on Broadway.

On June 7, 2026, the American Theatre Wing awarded a Special Tony Award to the League of Resident Theatres at the 79th Tony Awards held at Radio City Music Hall.

== List of Current Member Theaters ==
Theatre	City	State
Actors Theatre of Louisville	Louisville	KY
Alabama Shakespeare Festival	Montgomery	AL
Alley Theatre	Houston	TX
Alliance Theatre	Atlanta	GA
American Conservatory Theater	San Francisco	CA
American Repertory Theater	Cambridge	MA
Arden Theatre Company	Philadelphia	PA
Arena Stage	Washington	DC
Arizona Theatre Company	Tucson/Phoenix	AZ
Artists Repertory Theatre	Portland	OR
Asolo Repertory Theatre	Sarasota	FL
Baltimore Center Stage	Baltimore	MD
Barrington Stage Company	Pittsfield	MA
Barter Theatre	Abingdon	VA
Berkeley Repertory Theatre	Berkeley	CA
Capital Repertory Theatre	Albany	NY
Center Theatre Group	Los Angeles	CA
Cincinnati Playhouse in the Park	Cincinnati	OH
City Theatre Company	Pittsburgh	PA
Clarence Brown Theatre Company	Knoxville	TN
Cleveland Play House	Cleveland	OH
Court Theatre	Chicago	IL
Dallas Theater Center	Dallas	TX
Delaware Theatre Company	Wilmington	DE
Denver Center Theatre Company	Denver	CO
Ensemble Theatre Company	Santa Barbara	CA
Everyman Theatre	Baltimore	MD
Florida Studio Theatre	Sarasota	FL
Ford's Theatre	Washington	DC
Geffen Playhouse	Los Angeles	CA
George Street Playhouse	New Brunswick	NJ
Geva Theatre Center	Rochester	NY
Goodman Theatre	Chicago	IL
Goodspeed Musicals	East Haddam	CT
Great Lakes Theater	Cleveland	OH
Gulfshore Playhouse	Naples	FL
Guthrie Theater	Minneapolis	MN
Hartford Stage	Hartford	CT
Huntington Theatre Company	Boston	MA
Indiana Repertory Theatre	Indianapolis	IN
Kansas City Repertory Theatre	Kansas City	MO
La Jolla Playhouse	San Diego	CA
Laguna Playhouse	Laguna Beach	CA
Lincoln Center Theater	New York	NY
Long Wharf Theatre	New Haven	CT
Maltz Jupiter Theatre	Jupiter	FL
Manhattan Theatre Club	New York	NY
Marin Theatre	Mill Valley	CA
McCarter Theatre	Princeton	NJ
Merrimack Repertory Theatre	Lowell	MA
Milwaukee Repertory Theater	Milwaukee	WI
Northern Stage	White River Junction	VT
Northlight Theatre	Skokie	IL
Pasadena Playhouse	Pasadena	CA
People's Light	Malvern	PA
Philadelphia Theatre Company	Philadelphia	PA
Pittsburgh Public Theater	Pittsburgh	PA
PlayMakers Repertory Company	Chapel Hill	NC
Portland Center Stage	Portland	OR
Portland Stage Company	Portland	ME
Repertory Theatre of St. Louis	St. Louis	MO
Round House Theatre	Bethesda	MD
Roundabout Theatre Company	New York	NY
Seattle Repertory Theatre	Seattle	WA
Second Stage Theater	New York	NY
Shakespeare Theatre Company	Washington	DC
Signature Theatre	Arlington	VA
South Coast Repertory	Costa Mesa	CA
Steppenwolf Theatre	Chicago	IL
Studio Theatre	Washington	DC
Syracuse Stage	Syracuse	NY
The 5th Avenue Theatre	Seattle	WA
The Old Globe	San Diego	CA
Theatre for a New Audience	Brooklyn	NY
TheatreWorks Silicon Valley	Palo Alto	CA
Trinity Repertory Company	Providence	RI
Two River Theater	Red Bank	NJ
Union Arts Center	Seattle	WA
Utah Shakespeare Festival	Cedar City	UT
Westport Country Playhouse	Westport	CT
Wilma Theater	Philadelphia	PA
Yale Repertory Theatre	New Haven	CT
