= EgoPo Classic Theater =

EgoPo Classic Theater is a Philadelphia-based nonprofit repertory theater specializing in performing "Classic Theater on the Edge," often producing works of a collaborative nature that incorporates original music, dance, and masks. It was founded in 1991 in San Francisco by Lane Savadove who remains the company's Artistic Director. EgoPo has staged over two dozen productions and hundreds of performances in Philadelphia, New York, New Orleans, Chicago, Washington D.C., and internationally, in Indonesia and Croatia. The name "EgoPo" derives from the French words Ego (the decision-making part of our mind) and Peau (pronounced "Po", the skin), based on EgoPo's commitment to kinesthetic awareness and physical presence in performance). A volunteer Board of Directors governs EgoPo. EgoPo is headquartered at 318 Dickinson St. Philadelphia, PA 19107.

== History ==
EgoPo, whose name is derived from the French concept "The Physical-Self," was begun in San Francisco in 1991, as a theater company as well as an acting style. EgoPo moved operations to New Orleans in 2002, and built a new theatrical home, the Jewel Theater. The theater opened with a half-masked, expressionistic version of Frank Wedekind’s masterpiece, Spring Awakening (play). The production experienced a six-week sold-out run and garnered many awards. Also notable was a production of Company.

On August 27, 2005, the EgoPo company arrived in Philadelphia to begin technical rehearsals for a production of The Maids x 2, a ground-breaking version of Jean Genet’s classic, The Maids. Three days later EgoPo became known as Philadelphia’s "stranded theater company." EgoPo lost its theater to Hurricane Katrina, most company members lost their homes, and their funding base was gone.

An outpouring of financial and emotional support from the Philadelphia theater community, including The Pew Charitable Trusts, The Philadelphia Live Arts Festival and Philly Fringe, and the Arden Theater Co., enabled EgoPo to permanently relocate to Philadelphia. In February 2006, EgoPo staged The Maids x 2 Off Broadway at the Bouwerie Lane Theater.

In 2007, EgoPo began its new life as a Philadelphia company with a restaging of its Barrymore-nominated production of Spring Awakening at the Mainstage of the Adrienne Theater and restarted its professional conservatory.

Since that time, EgoPo has produced the Tennessee Williams’ Festival, and the Expressionism Festival, including the Burns’ Classic Reading Series, during which EgoPo united ten other Philadelphia-based theater companies for the yearlong event. The 2009-2010 season featured a yearlong Philadelphia Beckett Festival, including three mainstage performances and a dozen short Beckett plays presented at the Painted Bride Art Center. EgoPo also annually presents works at the Philadelphia Fringe Festival.

For the 2010-11 season, EgoPo produced a year-long "Theater of Cruelty Festival", the first season investigating the theory and work of Antonin Artaud since Peter Brook produced a similar season with the Royal Shakespeare Festival in 1964. This season featured an interactive cabaret production of four world premier adaptations of Artaud's writing, as well as a version of Peter Weiss' Marat Sade in West Philly's historic Rotunda, and a world premier adaptation of Henri Barbusse's Hell (L'Enfer). For the 2011-12 season, EgoPo produced a year-long "Jewish Theater Festival" including an environmental production of Anne Frank, a world-premier version of the Golem, and the Philadelphia premier of Tony Kushner's Dybbuk. For audience engagement, EgoPo is holding public Passover Seders and presented the Auschwitz trial documentary The Investigation.

Some notable productions are: Waiting for Godot, RamayanaCompany, Bluebird, Woyzeck, The Seagull, and Spring Awakening.

== Awards ==
EgoPo's awards include: two Barrymore Nominations for Outstanding Sound Design/Original Music and Outstanding Music Director. "Best Production of 2000" in New York by Backstage, two Big Easy nominations, five Storer Boone nominations, one Ambie Award, nine Marquee Nominations, six Louisiana Theater Festival Awards, and two Barrymore Awards for Excellence in Theater nominations.

EgoPo's renowned productions include a 72-hour performance in the Nevada Desert commissioned by the Desert Siteworks Project. and a commission from National Public Radio to adapt Beckett's prose Company, which was broadcast nationally, then went on to a yearlong run in three cities, and was awarded "Best Play of 2000".
