= Fat Ham =

2022 play by James Ijames

- Original language: English
- Written by: James Ijames
- Based on: Hamlet by William Shakespeare
- Genre: Drama

Premiere
- Date: April 23, 2021
- Place: Wilma Theater, Philadelphia

Fat Ham is a dramatic stage play written by American playwright James Ijames. It is a modern-day adaptation of William Shakespeare's Hamlet.

The play was awarded the 2022 Pulitzer Prize for Drama and was nominated for five Tony Awards including Best Play.

== Plot ==
A cookout celebrating the marriage of Tedra (representing Gertrude) and Rev (representing Claudius) is interrupted when family friend Tio (Horatio) witnesses the ghost of Pap, Tedra's deceased husband and Rev's brother. Tio informs Pap's son Juicy (Prince Hamlet), who recognizes the situation's parallels to Shakespeare's Hamlet. Pap, who had been abusive to Juicy, claims Rev ordered his death to get to Tedra, and demands Juicy murder Rev in revenge. Juicy is conflicted due to his mixed feelings about his father, as well as hoping to avoid perpetuating the cycle of violence and trauma in the family.

As Juicy attends the cookout, he finds himself grappling with his father's demand as well as his rough relationship with his mother and stepfather due to his homosexuality, weight, and future plans. Throughout the day he engages in discussions with Tio, his childhood friend Opal (Ophelia), and her brother Larry (Laertes – here depicted as a closeted man with whom Juicy previously shared a relationship) on how their generation feels trapped by the actions of their parents. After revealing Rev's potential guilt to Tedra, Juicy earns Larry's ire when he forcefully outs him to his mother Rabby (Polonius), who is taken aback but ultimately understanding. Tio offers a remedial story of a strange fantasy he had while playing a VR game involving sex with a gingerbread man, where he was encouraged to imagine a world where there was no sadness, and realized this was something he could will into existence through his own efforts.

Rev soon confronts Juicy over his accusation, but during the subsequent argument starts choking on some meat, and due to his homophobia refuses to let Juicy do the Heimlich on him. After Rev seemingly dies, Juicy points out to the others that the audience expects them all to die (except Tio, who points out Horatio survives Hamlet), as this is what happens in a tragedy. However, the others protest that just because their lives are expected to be tragic doesn't mean they have to be, and they in reality have no obligation to follow story structure or plot. Accepting that they can carry on with their lives despite prior tragedies, the family resumes the cookout, with Rev reviving and participating. Just as they realize Larry is missing, he emerges in fabulous drag and transforms the space into a dance club, leading the entire family in celebration of his true self.

== Productions ==
The play premiered on April 29, 2021 in a filmed production for the Wilma Theater in Philadelphia. The digital production was available until May 23. The filmed production took place at a home in Virginia due to COVID-19 restrictions at the time.

It made its off-Broadway debut at The Public Theater on May 12, 2022, to overwhelmingly positive reviews. The production received a Special Citation at the 66th Obie Awards honoring the creative team and ensemble. In 2023, the Public Theater production transferred to Broadway with the entire cast and most of the creative team intact. Previews began at the American Airlines Theatre on March 21, with opening night on April 12. The production once again received widespread critical acclaim and five Tony Award nominations, including Best Play and Best Director of a Play. The Broadway production was originally scheduled to have a strictly limited run through June 25, 2023. The run was extended through July 2, 2023, subsequently closing on that date.

The play had its West Coast premiere in spring 2024 with a production at the Geffen Playhouse, based on the Public Theater production. Sideeq Heard recreated Saheem Ali's direction, having served as Associate Director for the Broadway mounting. Most of the Broadway cast reprised their roles, with Matthew Elijah Webb taking over as Larry after understudying the role on Broadway.

In June 2024 The Old Globe Theatre in San Diego, California produced the play featuring a new cast under the direction of Sideeq Heard. Fat Ham ran at the Oregon Shakespeare Festival from March 11 to June 27, 2025, directed by Elizabeth Carter. The 2025 South Florida Premiere Production directed by T.M. Pride, ran from April 4 through May 4 at Island City Stage in Wilton Manors and May 16-June 15 at GableStage in Coral Gables.

The Public Theater/Broadway production made its UK premiere with the Royal Shakespeare Company at the Swan Theatre, Stratford-upon-Avon from 15 August until 13 September 2025, directed by Sideeq Heard.

In 2026, American Theatre Magazine named the play the fourth-most produced production in the U.S. for the 2025-2026 season.

== Notable casts ==
Character	Philadelphia	Off-Broadway	Broadway	Boston	Philadelphia	Stratford-upon-Avon
Character	2021	2022	2023			2025
Juicy	Brennen S. Malone	Marcel Spears	Marcel Spears	Marshall W. Mabry IV	Brenson Thomas	Olisa Odele
Pap	Lindsay Smiling	Billy Eugene Jones	Billy Eugene Jones	James T. Alfred	Lindsay Smiling	Sule Rimi
Rev	Lindsay Smiling	Billy Eugene Jones	Billy Eugene Jones	James T. Alfred	Lindsay Smiling	Sule Rimi
Tedra	Kimberly S. Fairbanks	Nikki Crawford	Nikki Crawford	Ebony Marshall-Oliver	Donnie Hammond	Andi Osho
Tio	Anthony Martinez-Briggs	Chris Herbie Holland	Chris Herbie Holland	Lau'rie Roach	Anthony Martinez-Briggs	Kieran Taylor-Ford
Rabby	Jennifer Kidwell	Benja Kay Thomas	Benja Kay Thomas	Thomika Marie Bridwell	Zuhairah	Sandra Marvin
Opal	Taysha Marie Canales	Adrianna Mitchell	Adrianna Mitchell	Victoria Omoregie	Jessica Johnson	Jasmine Elcock
Larry	Brandon J. Pierce	Calvin Leon Smith	Calvin Leon Smith	Amar Atkins	Brandon J. Pierce	Corey Montague-Sholay

== Awards and nominations ==
=== 2022 Off-Broadway production ===
Year	Award	Category	Nominee	Result
2022	Pulitzer Prize	Pulitzer Prize for Drama	James Ijames	Won
2022	Obie Awards	Special Citation	Creative Team and Ensemble	Won

=== 2023 Broadway production ===
Year	Award	Category	Nominee	Result
2023	Tony Awards	Best Play		Nominated
2023	Tony Awards	Best Direction of a Play	Saheem Ali	Nominated
2023	Tony Awards	Best Performance by an Actress in a Featured Role in a Play	Nikki Crawford	Nominated
2023	Tony Awards	Best Costume Design of a Play	Dominique Fawn Hill	Nominated
2023	Tony Awards	Best Lighting Design of a Play	Bradley King	Nominated
2023	Drama Desk Awards	Outstanding Play		Nominated
2023	Drama Desk Awards	Outstanding Sound Design of a Play	Mikaal Sulaiman	Nominated
2023	Drama League Awards	Outstanding Production of a Play		Nominated
2023	Drama League Awards	Distinguished Performance	Marcel Spears	Nominated
2023	Outer Critics Circle Awards	John Gassner Award	James Ijames	Won
2023	Dorian Award	Outstanding Broadway Play		Won
2023	Dorian Award	Outstanding LGBTQ Broadway Production		Won
2024	Lambda Literary Award	Drama	James Ijames	Won
