= Oana Botez =

Romanian-American theatre designer

Oana Botez is a Romanian-American theatre designer. Botez lives in New York City and Bucharest.

== Early life ==
Botez was born in Craiova, Romania to mother Rodica (Gardareanu) Botez, and father, Demostene Botez and raised in Bucharest. Her younger sister, Raluca, is an actress in Bucharest. Since 1995 she has been designing for stage and film, and has been creating guerrilla performances that draw attention to the political/social issues in a post-revolutionary Romania.

Starting in the 5th grade, Botez attended Liceul de Arte Plastice N.Tonitza, a fine arts conservatory in Bucharest. She received her BFA in Fashion Design from Bucharest Art Academy and an MFA in Design for Theater and Film from the Tisch School of the Arts, NYU.

== Career ==
Botez taught costume design at Colgate University, Brooklyn College, and MIT. Botez is currently an Associate Professor Adjunct in the Design Department at David Geffen School of Drama at Yale University She is a Princess Grace Recipient and NEA/TCG Career Development Program Recipient.

=== Awards ===
Botez has been nominated for the following awards:

- Lucille Lortel Awards
- Henry Hewes Design Award
- Barrymore Awards for Excellence in Theater
- Theater Bay Area Awards
- Drammy Award

Wins include:

- Barrymore Awards for Excellence in Theater
- Drammy Award
