= OyamO =

American dramatist

- Born: Charles F. Gordon; September 7, 1943 (age 82) Elyria, Ohio, U.S.
- Occupation: Playwright
- Education: Miami University; College of New Rochelle (BA); Yale University (MFA)

Charles F. Gordon (born September 7, 1943), known professionally as OyamO, is an American playwright and professor. He is currently a writer-in-residence at the University of Michigan.

== Early life ==
OyamO was born in Elyria, Ohio on September 7, 1943; one of seven children to Earnest Gordon, a steel worker, and Bennie Gordon, a housewife. As a child, he enjoyed the stories that his grandfather, a local preacher, would tell him about "the old days in the South." In fifth grade, his love of writing was noticed by a teacher after he wrote an assignment about his home life longer than that of any of his peers. He attended a predominately European high school, and was an honors student, editor of the school paper and student body president. He wrote fictional stories, poems, and letters to the local newspaper about various issues, which were published.

In 1963, OyamO began attending the Miami University at Oxford, Ohio but dropped out after two-and-a-half years, "angry at the educational system." Instead, he moved to New York, where he began working with Harlem's Black Theater Workshop. In 1970, he finished his bachelor's degree at the College of New Rochelle. He went on to receive his MFA in 1981 through Yale University's Playwriting program.

== Career ==
OyamO became interested in playwriting as a career, when, after working at the New Lafayette Theater as a lighting technician, he took a playwriting class by Ed Bullins, who became his mentor.

He has taught at Princeton University, College of New Rochelle, Emory University, and The University of Iowa's Playwrights Workshop. In 1989 he began to teach at the University of Michigan, where he is now an associate professor of theater and English.

He has written an episode of HBO's Famous Black American Anthology and optioned a version of his play I Am a Man, also for HBO.

His plays have been performed in theatres across the country, including the Yale Repertory Theatre; the Manhattan Theatre Club, the Working Theatre, the Public Theater, the Negro Ensemble Company, Frank Silvera Writers Workshop, New Federal Theatre, Frederick Douglas Creative Arts Center, and many more. He is a member of PEN, Dramatists Guild, New Dramatists (alumni), the Ensemble Studio Theatre, Writers Guild East, the O'Neill Playwrights Center, and the Black Theatre Network. He was awarded a PEW/TCG Playwright-in-Residence Fellowship for the year 2000 at the Philadelphia Theatre Company. He is a site monitor for the NEA and vice president of the Board of Directors of Theatre Communications Group.

== I Am a Man ==
I Am a Man tells the true story of T.O. Jones., who led the 1968 strike by sanitation workers against the anti-union, segregationist city of Memphis, Tennessee. The strike was precipitated by the death of two black sanitation workers. They were accidentally crushed when their foreman instructed them to wait out a rainstorm by sitting in the back of a garbage truck instead of in the garage with the white workers. Jones stands up to the mayor and fights for the day-to-day struggles of his men. The strike attracted national attention from civil rights activists and black power groups.

This strike was also the reason Martin Luther King Jr. was in Memphis when he was assassinated.

I Am a Man was well-received, with critics citing it as a historical drama about power, leadership, and the rough-and tumble process of social change. In its multifaceted search for the meaning behind the headline-grabbing events in Memphis, and in its depiction of the roots of black-vs.-black power struggles, it offers both food for thought and an emotional punch.

== Works ==
=== Playwright ===
- Breakout (1969)
- The Last Party (1970)
- The Juice Problem (1974)
- The Resurrection of Lady Lester (1981)
- Singing Joy (1988)
- Famous Orpheus (1991)
- Angels in the Men's Room (1992)
- I Am a Man (1992)
- In Living Colors (1992)
- Pink and Say (1996)
- Boundless Grace (1997)
- Let Me Live (1998)
- The White Black Man (1998)
- Liyanja (1998)
- In Living Colors (1999)
- Mundele (2001)
- Harry and the Streetbeat (2001)
- The Sorcerer's Apprentice (2006)
- Club Paradise (2007)
- City In a Strait (2007)
- Sing Jubilee (2008)

== Honors ==
He is a recipient of the Guggenheim Fellowship, as well as fellowships from the Rockefeller, McKnight, and Berrilla Kerr foundations. He also is a recipient of three fellowships from the National Endowment for the Arts. In 1999, he received the Eric Kocher Playwright's Award for The White Black Man.

== Personal life ==
OyamO has five children.

He has noted in interviews that he changed his name from his birth name of Charles Gordon to OyamO to separate himself from existing playwright Charles Gordone. The name OyamO came from children in his neighborhood in New York, who meant it as a play on his University of Miami Ohio sweatshirt.
