= Riverside Theatre (Iowa) =

Theater in Iowa City, Iowa, United States

- Location: Iowa City, Iowa
- Capacity: 150

Website
- www.riversidetheatre.org

Riverside Theatre is a professional theatre company in Iowa City, Iowa.

Riverside is affiliated with Actors' Equity Association and is a member of the Theatre Communications Group, the National New Play Network, the Shakespeare Association of America, and the Institute of Outdoor Drama.

As of 2018, the artistic director was Adam Knight.

Riverside produces classic to contemporary plays and hosts regional and state premieres. It also stages a summer program of Shakespeare plays at a local park.

== History ==
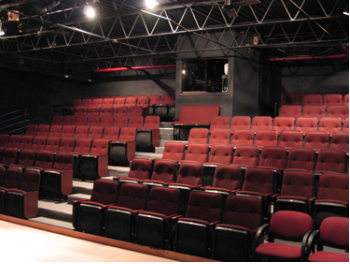
Seating at the original Gilbert Street stage

Riverside Theatre was founded by Ron Clark, Jody Hovland, and Bruce Wheaton in 1981 when they staged their first play "The Exercise" at the Old Armory building on the University of Iowa campus.

In 1983, Riverside moved to the Old Brick, an historic former church building in Iowa City. In 1990, Riverside moved into a space on Gilbert Street in Iowa City's Northside neighborhood. In 2020, Riverside announced a moved to the historic Crescent Building in downtown Iowa City. The new space would allow the theatre to accommodate more patrons, and provide more flexible space for productions and audiences.

=== Riverside Theatre in the Park ===
During the summer, Riverside stages Shakespeare plays in a 427-seat outdoor theatre in Iowa City's Lower City Park. The series debuted in 2000 with Twelfth Night and Much Ado About Nothing. In 2008, 2013, and 2014, Riverside was forced to relocate its summer productions due to flooding from the Iowa River. relocate due to flooding.

Beginning in 2018, Riverside began offering these summer productions to audiences free of charge.

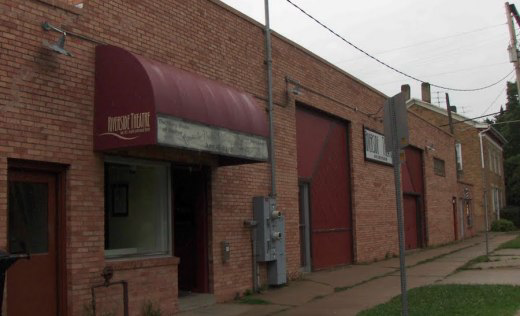
The awning at Riverside's first permanent home

==== Premieres ====
- Pairings From Shakespeare, 1984
- Il Magnifico, 1985 (world premiere)
- Riverside Revival, 1985
- Outward, 1987 (world premiere)
- Driving the Body Back, 1988
- First Lady Lou, 1988
- Dear Iowa, 1991 (world premiere)
- Chief, 1992 (world premiere)
- Gunplay, 1993 (world premiere)
- The Wooden O, 1994 (world premiere)
- Wish Me Pretty, Wish Me Strong, 1994 (world premiere)
- Harry's Way, 1997 (world premiere)
- Kindred Hearts, 1997 (world premiere)
- Marry me, 1998 (world premiere)
- Small Miracles, 1998 (world premiere)
- Grocery Stories, 2003 (world premiere)
- The Imaginary Invalid, 2005 (original adaptation/premiere)
- Prosperity, 2005 (world premiere)
- Kinnick, 2006 (world premiere)
- Coffee and Hope, 2008 (world premiere)
- Megan Gogerty Loves You Very Much, 2008 (world premiere)
- Raising Medusa, 2009 (world premiere)
- Manning Up, 2012 (rolling world premiere)
- The Exit Interview, 2013 (rolling world premiere)
- Birth Witches, 2013
- Lucky Me, 2015 (NNPN rolling world premiere)
- Housebroken, 2015 (world premiere) by Megan Gogerty
