= Alex Tatarsky =

American performance artist

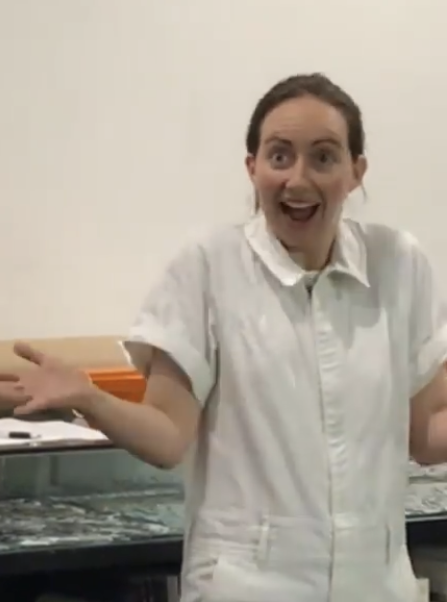
- Born: 1989 (age 36–37); New York, New York
- Education: Reed College (BA); New York University (MA); Pig Iron School
- Occupation: Performance artist
- Known for: Performance art
- Website: https://tatarsky.biz/

Alex Tatarsky is an American performance artist based in New York and Philadelphia. Their work draws from traditions including vaudeville and is most often presented in the personage of a bouffon.

They were included in the 2024 Whitney Biennial, where they presented the commissioned MATERIAL, which "considered both the physical substances that comprise and object and the information that becomes a performance."

Tatarsky has performed original solo pieces at venues including La Mama, Playwright Horizons, Abrons Arts Center, The Kitchen, and MoMA PS1.

In 2013, they appeared at the Andy Kaufman Awards, presenting themself as the daughter of Andy Kaufman, and announcing that Andy was still alive. Media eventually revealed this to be a hoax earlier arranged along with Michael Kaufman - Andy's brother, and host of the Awards.

Their 2023 show Sad Boys in Harpy Land, in which Tatarsky "inhabits a graduate seminar's worth of German literary characters like kindergarten drag... so frequently disrupt[ing] their own act with reflexive interrogation that the interruptions become the point", was presented at Playwright Horizons.

== Works ==
- MATERIAL
- Sad Boys in Harpy Land
- UNTITLED FREAKOUT (TELL ME WHAT TO DO)
- Americana Psychobabble

== Collaborations ==
Tatarsky is co-creator (along with Ming Lin) of the collective Canal Street Research Association and the collaborative project Shanzhai Lyric, which "takes inspiration from the experimental English of shanzhai t-shirts made in China and proliferating across the globe to examine how the language of counterfeit uses mimicry, hybridity, and permutation to both revel in and reveal the artifice of global hierarchies".

== Awards & Recognition ==
- Pew Center for Arts & Heritage Fellowship, 2020
- Mark O'Donnell Prize, 2024
- FCA Grant Recipient, 2025
