= InterAct Theatre Company =

Theatre group based in Philadelphia, PA, US

InterAct Theatre Company is located in Philadelphia, Pennsylvania. It is a founding member of the National New Play Network.

== History ==
InterAct Theatre was begun in 1988 by four graduates of the University of Pennsylvania. Artistic director Seth Rozin, along with Brad Rosenstein, Erica Schwartz and David Goldstein, founded the theatre after working together on an Irish theatre company's visit to the Annenberg Center for the Performing Arts. They wanted to promote cultural exchange between Ireland and America with a series of touring productions. After the tour around Ireland, they returned to Philadelphia and established InterAct. The theatre's mission was honed over the next few years, switching the focus to contemporary plays with social resonance.

In 1993, the theatre commissioned a new play 6221 — Prophecy and Tragedy based on the 1985 MOVE bombing in Philadelphia.

In 1997, InterAct gained its own premises at 2030 Sansom Street, Center City Philadelphia, where it remained located until 2016. "The Adrienne," the former home of The Wilma Theater, has been the home of many renowned productions. The 2012/2013 season marked InterAct's 25th Anniversary. The company has produced 97 main stage productions, including 45 world premieres, 2 U.S. premieres and over 47 Philadelphia premieres, in all providing employment for more than 800 local artists. They have commissioned new plays from playwrights such as Lee Blessing, Thomas Gibbons, Jason Sherman, Rehana Mirza, Jen Silverman, Peter Gil-Sheridan, Eric Pfeffinger, Kara Lee Corthron and R. Eric Thomas. At the beginning of the 2016 season, InterAct moved into a newly renovated, two-theater facility at The Drake, 1512 Spruce Street, Philadelphia.
