= Regional theater in the United States =

A regional theater or resident theater in the United States is a professional or semi-professional theater company that produces its own seasons. The term regional theater most often refers to a professional theater outside New York City. A regional theater may or may not be for profit or unionized. The term "playhouse" is often used to specifically denote this type of theater.

== Description ==
Regional theaters often produce new plays intended to be later produced on Broadway and works that do not necessarily have the commercial appeal required of a Broadway production. Some regional theaters have a loyal and predictable base of audience members, which can give the company latitude to experiment with unknown or "non-commercial" works. In 2003, Time magazine praised regional theaters for their enrichment of the theater culture in the United States. Some regional theaters serve as the "out-of-town tryout" venue for Broadway-bound shows, and some will accept touring Broadway shows.

Many regional theaters operate at least two stages: a main stage for shows requiring larger sets or cast, and one or more other stages (often studio theaters or black box theaters) for smaller, more experimental productions. In addition to box-office revenue, regional theaters rely on donations from patrons and businesses, season ticket subscriptions, and grants from foundations and government. Some have criticized regional theaters for being conservative in their selection of shows to accommodate the demographics of their subscribers and donors.

Theaters that develop new work, like the Alley Theatre, Long Wharf Theatre, La Jolla Playhouse, McCarter Theatre, and Berkeley Repertory Theatre, often work to move their productions to Broadway venues in New York. They may also educate young audiences through educational outreach programs. Cooperative programs with nearby university theater programs are also common at regional theaters. For example, the Asolo Repertory Theatre is a member of LORT and partners with Florida State University in operating the Florida State University/Asolo Conservatory for Actor Training.

== Regional theatre leagues ==
The two major organizations that help to maintain the general welfare of resident theater in the United States are the League of Resident Theatres (LORT) and the Theatre Communications Group (TCG). These organizations encourage communication and good relations between their members and in the community, as well as promoting a larger public interest and support of regional theater.

There are currently 82 LORT theaters located in 30 states and the District of Columbia. LORT acts on behalf of its members in matters pertaining, but not limited to; collective bargaining with unions such as Actors’ Equity Association, United Scenic Artists, and the Stage Directors and Choreographers Society, representation before government agencies on problems of labor relations, and the handling of disputes between members and their employees or union representatives.

The TCG’s mission is similar. TCG’s constituency has grown to encompass more than 700 members throughout the United States. They publish the American Theatre Magazine, the ARTSEARCH online employment bulletin, and dramatic literature.

In recognition of the importance of regional theaters in America, the American Theatre Wing gives a Regional Theatre Tony Award to one regional theater each year during the Tony Awards. This recipient is selected based on a recommendation by the American Theatre Critics Association and receives an award grant of $25,000.

== The Little Theater Movement ==
In the second and third decades of the twentieth century, there was a push to get away from the conservative, mainstream ideology of Broadway. The Little Theatre Movement was a precursor of the Regional Theater Movement; it was started by theater artists interested in experimentation and exploring social issues through the dramatic arts. The movement altered the face of the American stage and allowed room for new works and new audiences.

== Nonprofit theatres ==
When the first national organization of nonprofit theaters was formed in 1961, there were only 23 regional theaters in the U.S. By 2003, the number of regional theaters had grown to 1,800. As non-profits, they rely heavily on donations from patrons, and some theaters have been accused of "pandering to the audience," subordinating their artistic ideals to the need for donations.

== See also ==
- Community theatre
- List of LORT Member Theatres
- Regional Theatre Tony Award
- Broadway theatre – for the other main category of American theatre
