= Opus (play) =

- Original language: English
- Written by: Michael Hollinger
- Characters: Elliot; Alan; Carl; Dorian; Grace
- Setting: Interiors of NYC, London, Pittsburgh, and Washington, D.C.

Premiere
- Date: January 2006
- Place: Arden Theatre Company; Philadelphia, Pennsylvania

Opus is a 2006 play written by Michael Hollinger.

== Plot ==
The play involves the Lazara Quartet, a string quartet at the top of their field but with a sudden need to replace violist Dorian, who was just fired. Dorian is a mix of an emotionally unstable man who needs medication and a musical genius who demands the best of the other three. Dorian and his lover Elliot, the first violinist of the quartet, have frequent outbursts, which have slowed the quartet’s progress to the point that Dorian is fired because he "steals" an expensive Lazara violin that was given to the group and is played by Elliot. The three remaining members recruit Grace, a talented, younger musician who is unsure of her career path. The four work to perfect their skills as a team preparing for a special White House performance. We also find out that Carl has cancer and is probably dying.

The play culminates after the White House performance with the abrupt reappearance of Dorian. Behind the scenes, Dorian proposed to Carl that the group fire Elliot, rehire Dorian, and keep Grace. Carl, Alan, Grace, and Dorian unite as a bloc and fire Elliot. An argument over possession of the Lazara violin explodes, and Carl takes the instrument from Elliot and smashes it to pieces, saying that the quartet must have "perspective". In the final words of the play, Alan says, "Elliot, Dorian, Carl and me, all of us in our nineties… playing the Adagio from Opus fifty-nine… And we come to a rest in the middle of the movement and stop, just...stop."

== Performances ==
The play made its New York debut at the 59E59 Theaters as part of the Primary Stages season on October 7, 2007, with David Beach, Mahira Kakkar, Michael Laurence, Douglas Rees and Richard Topol. It was adapted as a radio drama performed in May 2012 by L.A. Theatre Works with Kevin Chamberlin, Jere Burns, Steven Culp and Liza Weil, which was released in September 2012.
