= Michael Hollinger =

American playwright (born 1962)

Michael Hollinger (born January 13, 1962, in Lancaster, Pennsylvania) is an American playwright who is currently an associate professor of theatre at Villanova University and an alumnus of New Dramatists. He received a Bachelor of Music in viola performance from Oberlin Conservatory in 1984 and a Master of Arts in theatre from Villanova in 1989. He has been married to Megan Bellwoar since 1990.

Because of his background as a musician, Hollinger considers his plays compositions. He is quoted as saying, "Plays are music to me; characters are instruments, scenes are movements; tempo, rhythm and dynamics are critical; and melody and counterpoint are always set in relief by rests—beats, pauses, the spaces in between."

Hollinger has written three short films for PBS and co-authored the feature-length Philadelphia Diary. His awards include the Roger L. Stevens Award from the Fund for New American Plays, three Barrymore Awards for Outstanding New Play, a Los Angeles Drama Critics Circle Award, the F. Otto Haas Award for an Emerging Theatre Artist, a Mid-Atlantic Emmy Award, a commission from The Ensemble Studio Theatre/Alfred P. Sloan Foundation Science and Technology Project, and fellowships from the Independence Foundation, Mid-Atlantic Arts Foundation, and Pennsylvania Council on the Arts.

== Works ==
Full-length plays:

- Under the Skin (2015)
- Hope and Gravity (2014)
- Cyrano, translated, and co-adapted with Aaron Posner (2011)
- Ghost-Writer (2010)
- A Wonderful Noise (musical), co-authored with Vance Lehmkuhl (2009)
- Opus (2006)
- Tooth and Claw (2004)
- Red Herring (2000)
- Tiny Island (1997)
- Incorruptible (1996)
- An Empty Plate in the Cafe du Grand Boeuf (1994)

Plays for young audiences:

- Eureka!
- Hot Air
- Boxheads
- Clean Getaway (musical), co-authored with Beth Dannenfelser

Ten-minute plays:

- Battle of the Backyard
- Senior Moment
- Truth Decay
- Naked Lunch
- Serviette
- Two-Part Invention

Screenplays:

- Opus
- Incorruptible
- Pipe
