= Pig Iron Theatre Company =

Performance ensemble in Philadelphia, PA

- Formation: 1995
- Type: Theatre group
- Location: Philadelphia, PA
- Website: pigiron.org

Pig Iron Theatre Company is a multidisciplinary ensemble based in Philadelphia, Pennsylvania. The company has created over 40 original works over the past 26 years, performed both locally and internationally. Their individual works have been inspired by history and biography, rock music, American kitsch culture, scientific research and our relationship to our geologic time. They have toured to festivals and theaters in places such as England, Scotland, Poland, Lithuania, Brazil, Ireland, Japan, Italy, Romania and Germany, among many others.

== About ==
The mission of the company is to "expand what is possible in performance by creating unusual and exuberant ensemble-devised works; by training the next generation of daring, innovative theatre artists; and by consistently asking the hardest questions, both in our art and in its relation to the world around us."

This mission statement is realized through the unique creation process that is used. Using improvisation, company discussion, and a development period of over a year, the projects are all unique and distinct. Shows range from a rock-n-roll cabaret piece emceed by James Joyce's institutionalized daughter (The Lucia Joyce Cabaret) to an interactive "simulated economic environment" with a cast of 30 (Pay Up).

Pig Iron is made up of three artistic directors, four company members, a small administrative staff, and a board of directors. Company members have included scenic designer Mimi Lien, a recipient of a MacArthur Fellowship and a Tony Award. The company has received numerous awards for their work, including nine Barrymore awards and an OBIE Award (2004-Hell Meets Henry Halfway). In 2010 co-artistic directors Gabriel Quinn Bauriedel, Dan Rothenberg, and Dito van Reigersberg won a Fellow award granted by United States Artists.

The company has toured both locally and internationally, including festivals in Poland, Lithuania, Scotland, Ireland, Romania, Brazil, Italy, Ukraine, and England. In addition to their main shows, Pig Iron also hosts a cabaret-style show as a fundraiser for the company each year.

In 2011, Pig Iron was awarded the American Theatre Wing's National Theatre Company Grant.

== School ==
Founded in 2011, the Pig Iron School for Advanced Performance Training is a postgraduate program which was accredited through the University of the Arts from 2015 until the university's closure in 2024. In 2025, the program resumed in partnership with Rowan University.

Notable alumni include performance artist Alex Tatarsky.
