= The Breath of Life (play) =

2002 play by Sir David Hare

The Breath of Life is a 2002 play by Sir David Hare. It tells the story of a woman who is confronted by the wife of her lover. Over the course of one day and one night, the two women reflect on their lives and the relationship with the central, yet offstage, male character.

Of the central theme of the play, Hare wrote "You can no longer call it middle age, and you certainly can't call it old age. It's something in between... I wanted to describe two women at exactly that moment; a long past behind them, but the expectation of a considerable future in front of them."

It took Hare a full 12 months to write the play.

The play began previews at the Theatre Royal Haymarket in the West End on 3 October 2002, starring Judi Dench as Frances Beale and Maggie Smith as Madeleine Palmer. It was sold out by the time it opened on 15 October 2002.

It was due to play a strictly-limited season until 21 December 2002, but demand was so popular the run was extended to 1 February 2003, following a Christmas break. The show then added another month to its run, closing on 1 March 2003.

Plans for the play to transfer to Broadway, with Smith reprising her role and Dianne Wiest taking over from Dench, were rumored in 2003 but were never established. Although the play has since been performed in the US, by regional companies, it has yet to receive a Broadway premiere.

Isla Blair and Patricia Hodge starred in a short revival of the play at the Lyceum Theatre, Sheffield from 21 to 26 February 2011.
