= R. Eric Thomas =

American writer

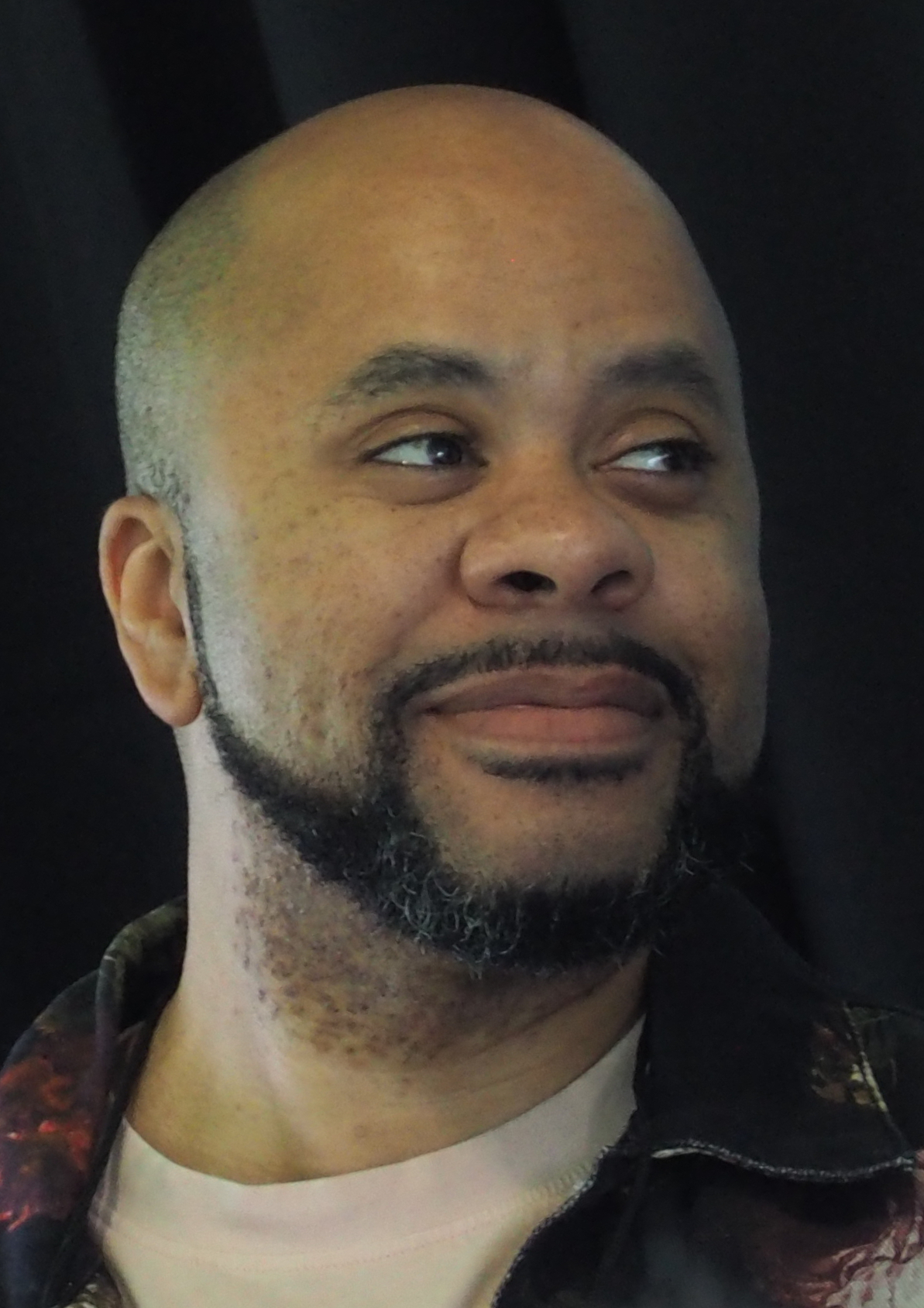
- R. Eric Thomas, in 2024
- Born: c. 1982 (age 43–44); Baltimore
- Occupations: Author, playwright, screenwriter
- Notable work: Here For It (2020)
- Website: rericthomas.com

R. Eric Thomas is an American author, playwright, television writer and advice columnist. He is best known for his essay collection Here For It: Or, How to Save Your Soul in America (2020).

== Early life ==
Thomas grew up in Baltimore, Maryland. He attended the Park School of Baltimore, then Columbia University and transferred to University of Maryland, Baltimore County, where he studied playwriting.

== Career ==
For four years, Thomas wrote "Eric Reads the News," a popular daily humor column covering pop culture and politics for Elle. He is the long-running host of The Moth in Philadelphia and Washington, D.C.

He has written for the television shows Dickinson (Apple TV+) and Better Things (FX).

In February 2020, Thomas published the essay collection, Here for It: Or, How to Save Your Soul in America. The book was a Today Show Read with Jenna Book Club Pick. Here For It was a finalist for the Lambda Literary Award, named one of the best ten best book of the year by Teen Vogue, and one of the best books of the year by O: The Oprah Magazine.

In October 2020, Thomas and Helena Andrews-Dyer published the book, Reclaiming Her Time: The Power of Maxine Waters, which The Atlantic included in "The 10 Best Political Books of 2020 by Black Women". The Washington Post described the book as, "There’s plenty of funny on these pages. And not just a line here or there; we’re talking curse you for making my face wrinkle this way I am now reaching for the eye cream funny. The writers are unabashed fans, writing for those who share the love and making the case that political biographies shine bright when they have as much panache as their subject."

In May 2022, Thomas published the YA book, Kings of B'more. BuzzFeed described the book as "infused with all the joy of the best teen movie."

Thomas won a 2022 Lambda Literary Award in the "LGBTQ Drama" category for his play, Mrs. Harrison.

In 2023, Thomas published a second collection of personal essays called Congratulations, the Best Is Over!

In 2024, after briefly writing Dear Prudence, Thomas began writing the advice column Asking Eric for Tribune Content Agency; in May 2024, fellow advice columnist Amy Dickinson announced her retirement and encouraged her readers to begin reading Asking Eric instead.

== Personal ==
Thomas is gay and married to David Johnston Norse, a Presbyterian minister. The two were married in 2016.

Thomas is outspoken about his depression and struggles with mental health. He told The Advocate that he spent the two years writing Here For It "deeply, deeply depressed".
