= Theatre Communications Group =

American non-profit organization

- Founded: 1961
- Type: Theatrical
- Headquarters: New York City, New York, United States
- Website: tcg.org

Theatre Communications Group (TCG) is an American non-profit service organization headquartered in New York City that promotes professional non-profit theater in the United States.

The organization also publishes American Theatre magazine and ARTSEARCH, a theatrical employment bulletin, as well as trade editions of theatrical scripts.

== History ==
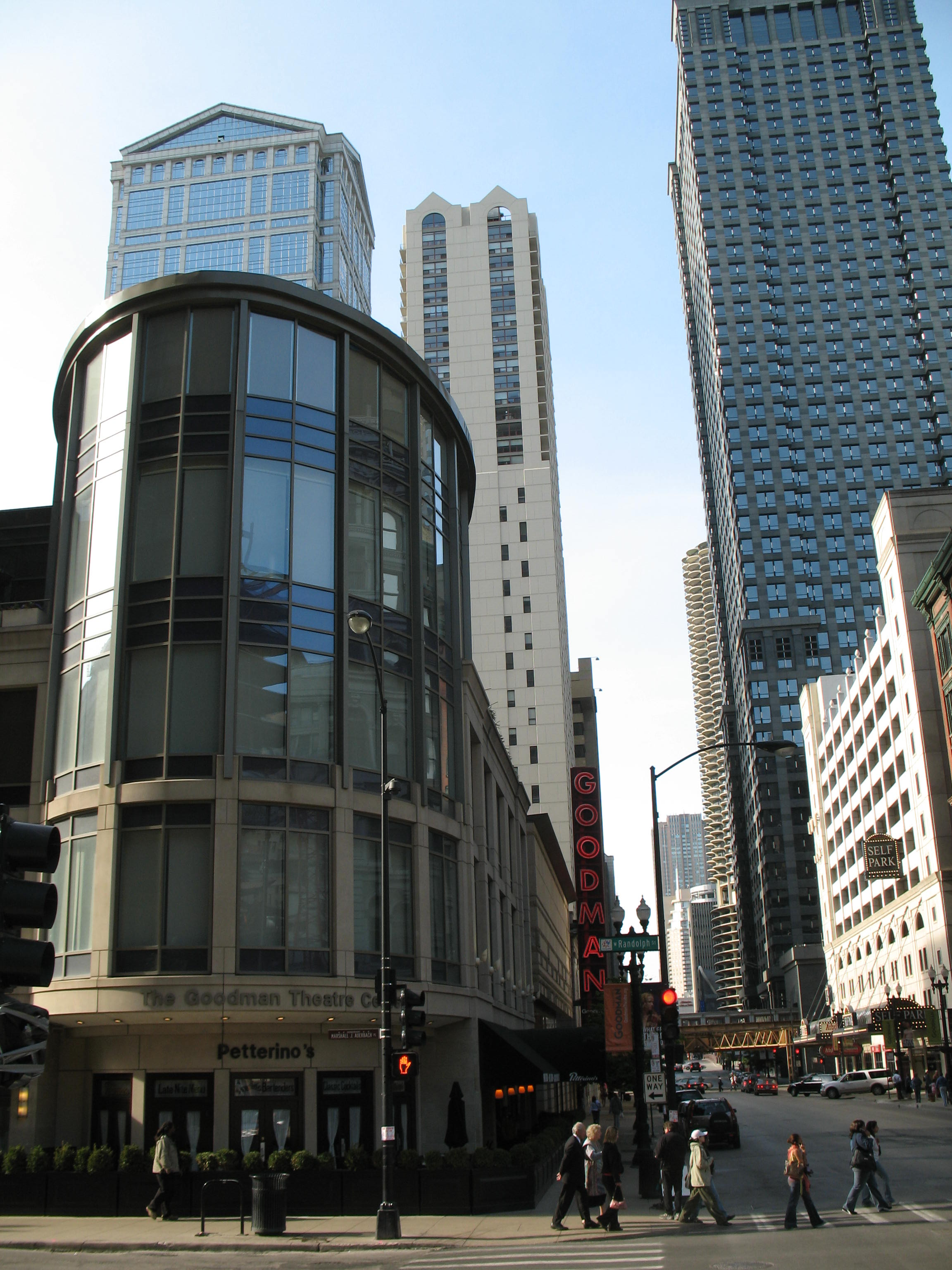
The Goodman Theatre in Chicago, one of the original founding members of TCG

Theatre Communications Group was established in 1961 with a grant from the Ford Foundation in response to their then arts and humanities director W. McNeil Lowry's desire to foster communication and cooperation among the growing community of regional theaters throughout the country. Though initially run as a Ford Foundation administered program, TCG independently incorporated in 1964.

The organization began with a membership of 15 regional and community theaters, and nine university drama departments under the leadership of Pat Brown. In its first decade of operation, other leaders included Michael Mabry, Joseph Zeigler and Hartney Arthur. In 1972, Peter Zeisler was named Executive Director, a position he would hold for 23 years. Under Zeisler’s leadership, TCG created many of its longest-running programs, including annual National Conference, American Theatre magazine and TCG Books.

After Zeisler retired in 1995, the organization was led by John Sullivan, (1993–1997) Ben Cameron (1996–2006), and Joan Channick (1999–2006). TCG was named the United States Center for the International Theater Institute in 1999 and Tony Honors for Excellence in Theatre in 2005.

As of 2014, TCG has over 700 member theaters located in 47 states; 12,000 individual members; and 150 University, Trustee and other business affiliates. Teresa Eyring was appointed Executive Director in 2007.

== TCG Books ==
Founded in 1984, TCG Books is considered the largest independent publisher of dramatic literature in North America. As of 2014, it has published the work of 235 playwrights and theater professionals in over 1,600 titles, including 16 winners of the Pulitzer Prize for Drama, one winner of the Nobel Prize for Literature, as well as numerous Tony Award, Drama Desk, and Obie Award winners.

== Periodicals ==
Theatre Communications Group publishes American Theatre magazine, a periodical focused on the non-profit professional theater, and ARTSEARCH, a career and job search resource for performing arts professionals. American Theatre is published 10 times a year and distributed to TCG members free of charge. ARTSEARCH is published digitally and released on a quarterly basis.

== See also ==
- List of Theatre Communications Group member theatres
- Regional theater in the United States
- List of LORT Member Theatres
