= Aaron Posner =

American playwright and theater director

Aaron Posner is an American playwright and theatre director. He was co-founder of the Arden Theatre Company in Philadelphia and was the artistic director of Two River Theater from 2006 to 2010. He has directed over 100 productions at major regional theater companies across the country. He has won six Helen Hayes Awards, two Barrymore Awards, the Outer Critics Circle Award, the John Gassner Prize, a Joseph Jefferson Award, a Bay Area Theatre Award, and an Eliot Norton Award.

== Biography ==
Born in Madison, Wisconsin, and raised in Eugene, Oregon, Posner is the son of Michael Posner and Sharon Posner. He was married to six-time Helen Hayes Award winning actress Erin Weaver. They have one daughter together.

In 1988, Posner was the founding artistic director of Philadelphia's Arden Theatre Company, where he served as artistic director for the company's first 10 seasons. Later, from 2006 to 2010, he was artistic director of Two River Theatre Company in Red Bank, New Jersey. Since 2010 he has lived near Washington DC where he has worked at virtually every theatre in the area as a director and playwright. He has adapted novels as plays, and later created new variations of classic plays, including some by William Shakespeare and Anton Chekhov. Among Posner's best-known early adaptions are The Chosen (1999), based on Chaim Potok's 1967 novel of the same name, and My Name Is Asher Lev (2009), based on Potok's 1972 novel of the same name.

With composer James Sugg, Posner created A Murder, A Mystery & A Marriage: A Mark Twain Musical (2006), adapted from a short story of the same name by Mark Twain that was published in 2001. Posner wrote the book and lyrics. The work premiered in Wilmington, Delaware, in a co-production of the Round House Theatre and the Delaware Theatre Company.

Posner's most produced play is a variation of Chekhov's 1896 play The Seagull, under the title of Stupid Fucking Bird, premiered in 2013 by the Woolly Mammoth Theatre Company in Washington, D.C. It was very different from his previous adaptations, his own answer to Chekhov, rather than a more conventional adaptation. The play has since been produced more than 200 times by professional and amateur theatre companies and universities in the United States, as well as internationally, including professional productions in Australia, Canada, Romania, Estonia, Luxembourg, Sweden, South Africa, Mexico, and other countries.

Posner has adapted Chekhov's Uncle Vanya and Three Sisters as well. His Life Sucks (2015) premiered at Theater J in Washington, D.C. No Sisters (2017), which premiered at the Studio Theatre in Washington, D.C., ran as a companion play to their production of Three Sisters.

For the Chicago Shakespeare Theater, Posner co-directed The Tempest with magician Teller. The production made use of the songs of Tom Waits and Kathleen Brennan. Posner re-imagined Shakespeare's The Merchant of Venice, in a variation called District Merchants: An Uneasy Comedy (2016) commissioned by Folger Theatre. It is set in Washington, D.C., during the Reconstruction era, after the end of the Civil War. Exploring relations between Jewish and African-American businessmen and other residents in the city, including people of color free before the war and newly emancipated freedmen, it premiered at the Folger Shakespeare Library on May 31, 2016.

Posner is a tenured full professor in the Theatre/Musical Theatre program at American University in Washington, D.C.
