= Theatre Horizon =

American theater group

Theatre Horizon is a theater group located in Norristown, Pennsylvania.

== Performances ==
The group performs plays, musicals, open-air, and "community-centered theater." According to an interview with artistic director Nell Bang-Jensen in 2023, Theatre Horizon seeks “to engage community members, specifically community members who haven't felt a sense of belonging at the theater.”

== History ==
Erin Reilly and Matthew Decker founded the theater in 2005 as a summer theater with open air performances. In 2019, Bang-Jensen succeeded Reilly as artistic director. She is Senior Lecturer at the Ira Brind School of Theater Arts at Philadelphia's University of the Arts.

They moved to a building in the Norristown Arts District in 2012, remodeling a home to be a theater with seating for 120.

== Education initiatives ==
The theater's administrators say that more than 10,000 children have participated in drama classes and camps. Company members started an autism program. Group members started a Drama Club at Eisenhower High School in Norristown.

The autism program for children and adults was covered on The Kelly Clarkson Show.

== Awards ==
- American Theatre Wing's National Theatre Company Award
- Barrymore Award
