= People's Light and Theatre Company =

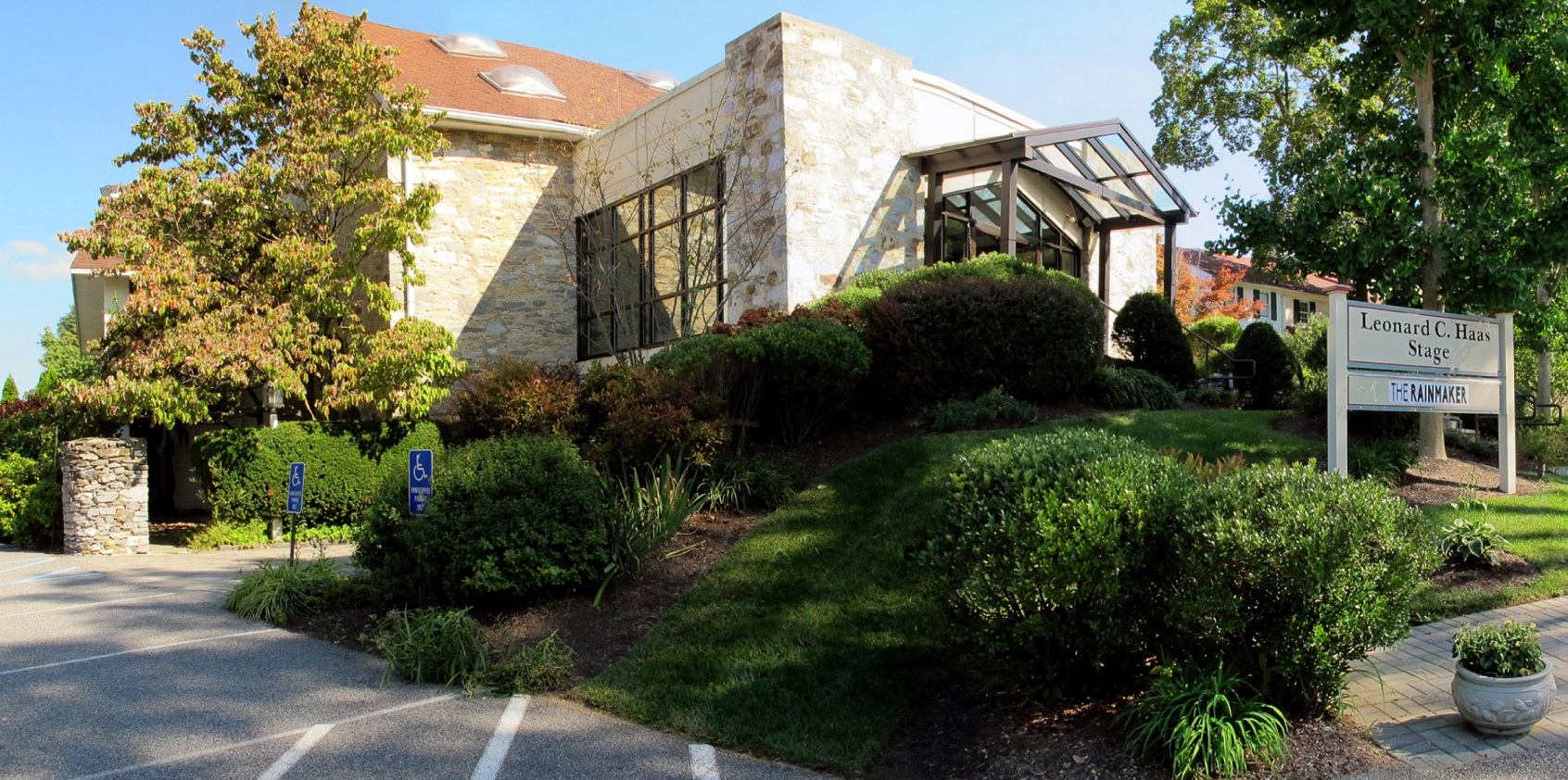
- Leonard C. Haas Stage
- Interactive map of People's Light and Theatre Company
- Address: 39 Conestoga Road; Malvern, Pennsylvania; United States
- Coordinates: 40.0449°N 75.53249°W
- Owner: Non-profit Organization
- Capacity: Leonard C. Haas Stage- 350, Steinbright Stage- 170
- Current use: Professional theatre

Construction
- Opened: 1974
- Rebuilt: 1979

Website
- peopleslight.org

People's Light and Theatre Company is a professional non-profit theatre company in Malvern, Pennsylvania.

== History ==
People's Light, a professional non-profit theatre company, was founded in 1973 by Dick Keeler, Ken Marini, and Megan and Danny Fruchter, after the group left Hedgerow Theatre. They became known as the Hedgerow Theatre Corporation, but renamed as the People's Light and Theatre Company in 1974. The original site of the theatre was in Strode's Mill, a historic grist mill in East Bradford Township, Pennsylvania. The Emperor Jones by Eugene O'Neill was the first production staged by the company in July 1974. They had a $16,000 production budget and 1,300 attendants in their first season. From 1976 to 1978, the company performed in the Center for the Performing Arts in Chester Springs, Pennsylvania, to gain more seating. Their first production in Chester Springs was Mother Courage and Her Children by Bertolt Brecht. They moved to Malvern, Pennsylvania, in 1979. The theatre company performed tours at prisons until 1986.

The company celebrated its 10-year anniversary in October 1984 with a gala.

The People's Light campus is located on 4.7 acres (0.019 km^{2}) of what was once a 1,000-acre (4.0 km^{2}) tract granted by William Penn to the Malin family in 1709. Part of this tract of land was occupied by George Washington's troops after the Battle of Brandywine. The barn that houses the Leonard C. Haas Stage of the theatre was renovated in 1978 by Knabb Associates. The residence was built in 1790 and was used as a private boys' school, which was the first school in East Whiteland Township, Pennsylvania.

In 1986, a second stage holding 150 seats, initially called Second Stage and later the Steinbright Stage, was built on the Malvern site for $1.5 million. By 1987, People's Light had an operating budget of $1.3 million, 5,400 season ticket subscribers, and an annual attendance of over 65,000 people. By 1989, the budget increased to $1.75 million, and People's Light established an annual resident company of actors.

It produces classics and contemporary plays, and commissions and produces new work: of their 436 productions by 2018, over one-third (166) had been world or regional premieres. It has an agreement with the labor union Actors' Equity Association.

== Community programs ==
In 1987, People's Light started the "Project Discovery" program, which was later renamed "Arts Discovery." Project Discovery was initially a three-year project designed to allow 4,000 Chester County, Pennsylvania, high school students to see two productions at People's Light.

Community Matters is a series of events with free staged play readings and town hall-style discussions in partnership with local service organizations.
