= Wilma Theater (Philadelphia) =

Theater company in Philadelphia, PA

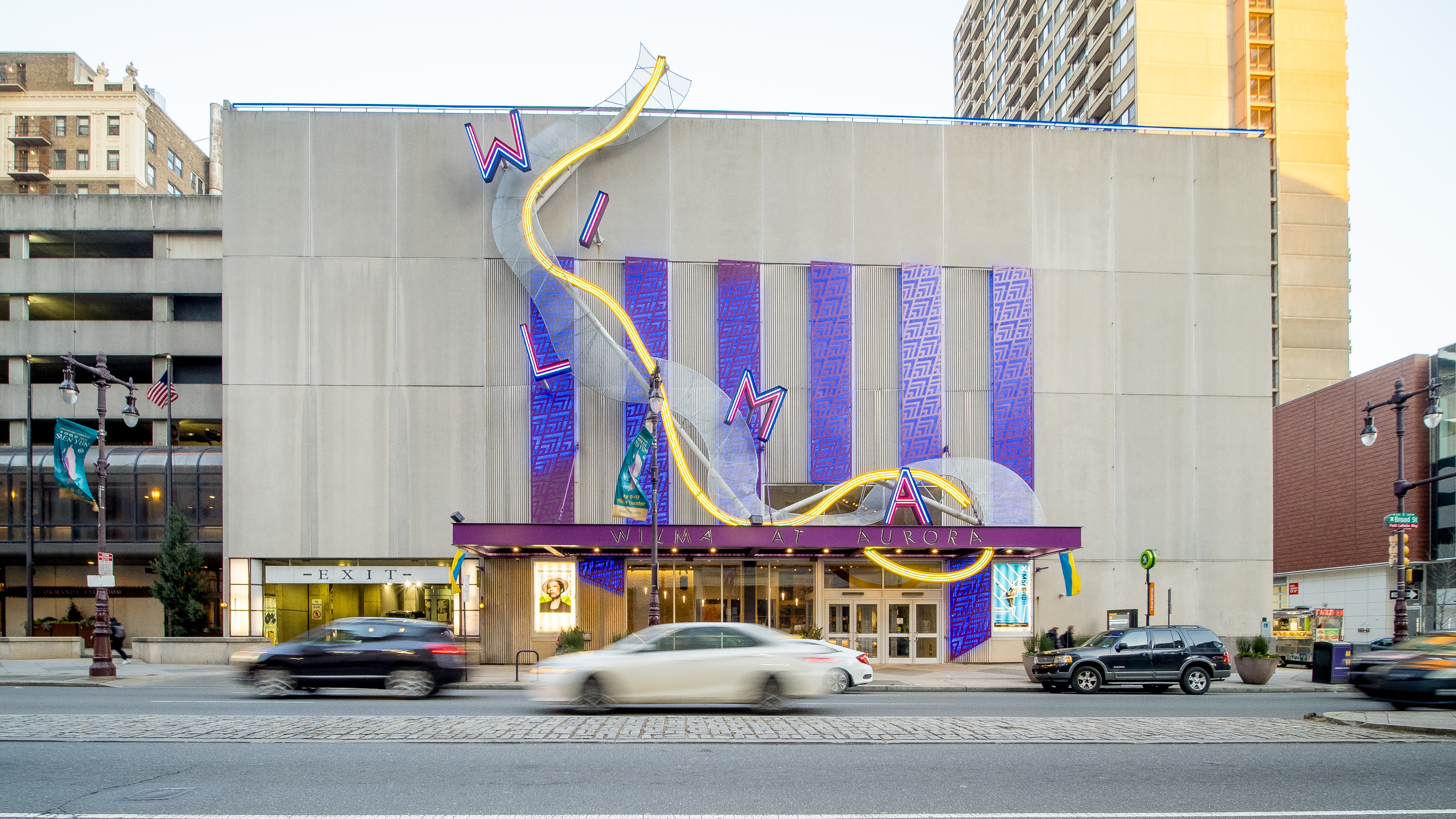
- The Wilma Theater in 2024
- Interactive map of Wilma Theater
- Former names: Wilma Project (1973–1996)
- Address: 265 Broad Street, Philadelphia; Pennsylvania; USA
- Coordinates: 39°56′50.4″N 75°09′52.2″W
- Capacity: 296

Construction
- Opened: 1996

Website
- https://wilmatheater.org/

The Wilma Theater is a non-profit theater company located at 265 S. Broad Street at the corner of Spruce Street in the Avenue of the Arts area of Center City, Philadelphia. The company's current 296-seat theater opened in 1996 and was designed by Hugh Hardy.

== History ==
The Wilma Theater began in 1973 as the "Wilma Project", founded to produce original material and to develop community-oriented artists. The name "Wilma" refers to an imaginary oppressed sister of Shakespeare created by Virginia Woolf.

Blanka Zizka and Jiri Zizka from Czechoslovakia joined the project in 1979 as artists-in-residence, and later took over artistic leadership, changing the name to the Wilma Theater. The company staged their productions at a variety of different theaters, in particular a 100-seat converted garage on Sansom Street, but opened their current 296-seat theater on S. Broad Street in 1996.

Jiri Zizka left the theater at the end of the 2009–2010 season and died in January 2012.

In 2015, the theater formed a permanent troupe of in-house actors, the Hothouse.

Yury Urnov, James Ijames, and Morgan Green were named co-artistic directors alongside Blanka Zizka in 2020, with Zizka retiring in 2021. Ijames departed the Wilma in 2023 and Lindsay Smiling, an actor in the theater's resident HotHouse company, was named as a co-artistic director with Urnov and Green. In 2026, it was announced that Lindsay Smiling would become the sole artistic director, with Urnov staying on as resident director.

== Awards and honors ==
As of 2018, the theater had won 68 Barrymore Awards for Excellence in Theatre and received 238 nominations.

On May 22 2024, it was announced that the Wilma would be the recipient of the 2024 Regional Theatre Tony Award, which comes with a $25,000 grant. Zizka credited the Hothouse for the award, describing them as the "soul" of the Wilma. WHYY's arts and culture reporter Peter Crimmins has similarly noted that "The Wilma is distinctive not only for the excellence of its original productions, but [also] for its unique approach to running a theater company."
