= Philadelphia Theatre Company =

Theater company in Pennsylvania

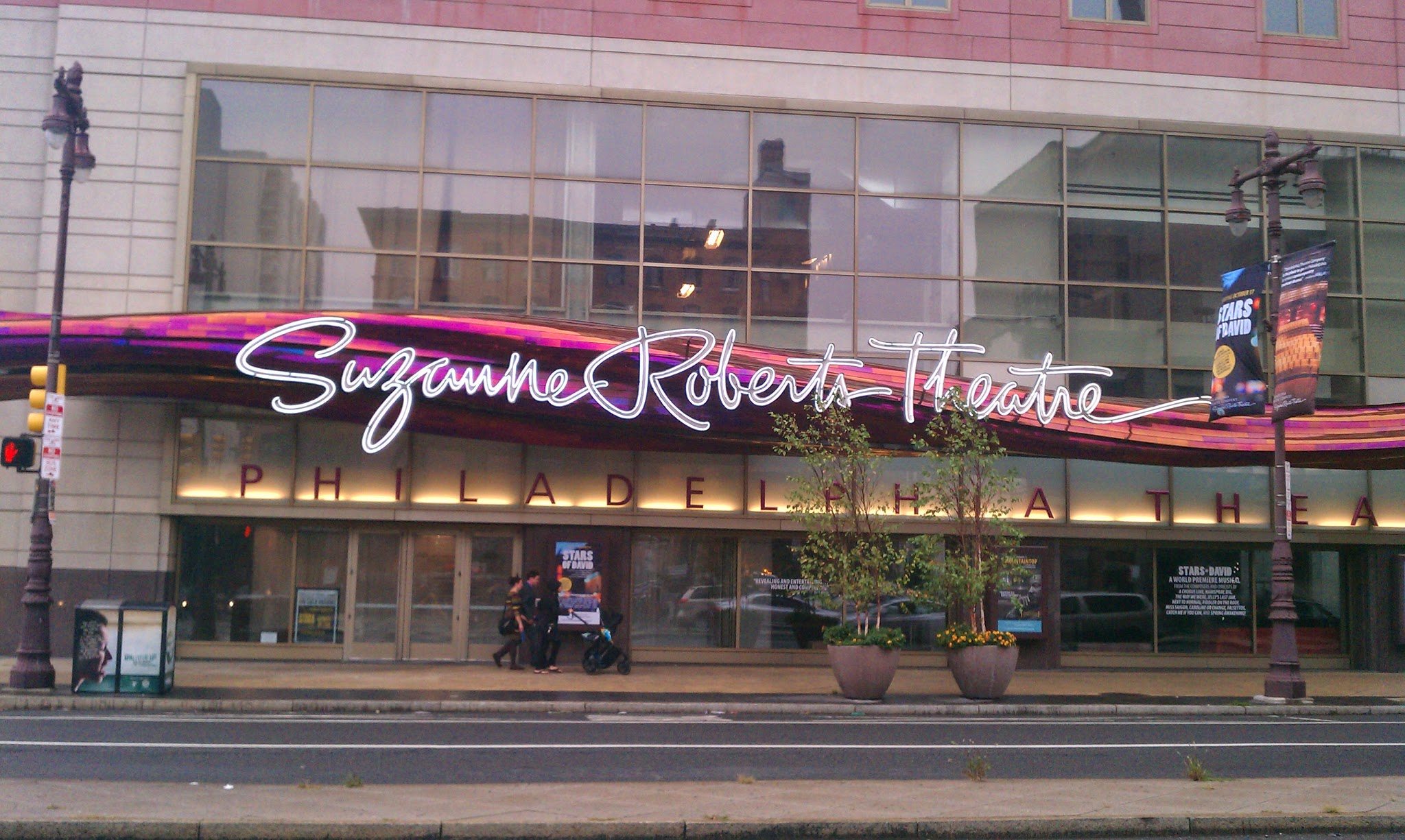
The Suzanne Roberts Theatre, home of the Philadelphia Theatre Company

The Philadelphia Theatre Company (PTC) is a theater company located in Philadelphia, Pennsylvania. It was founded in 1974 as The Philadelphia Company by Robert Hedley and Jean Harrison. Since October 2007, PTC's has been based at the Suzanne Roberts Theatre on the Avenue of the Arts. Prior to that, PTC was housed at the historic Plays and Players Theatre for 25 years.

== History ==
The Philadelphia Theatre Company was founded in 1974 by Robert Hedley and Jean Harrison. Soon thereafter, Sara Garonzik joined the company, eventually rising to the position of Producing Artistic Director. Joined in 1989 by General Manager Ada Coppock, Garonzik led the company to local and national prominence for her commitment to premiering new American plays. Together, Coppock and Garonzik built the Philadelphia Theatre Company into a commercial and artistic success. They led the building of a new home for the Philadelphia Theatre Company on the Avenue of the Arts, in the Suzanne Roberts Theatre.

In 2017, Paige Price assumed the role of Producing Artistic Director and was joined 5 months later by new Managing Director Emily Zeck. The team had worked together previously at Theatre Aspen. David L. Cohen, senior executive vice president and chief diversity officer at Comcast NBCUniversal, assumed the role of chair in 2017, completing a full leadership transition for the company.

As of 2023, the company is led by co-Artistic Directors Taibi Magar and Tyler Dobrowsky.
