= Arden Theatre Company =

Theatre in Philadelphia, Pennsylvania, US

- Formation: 1988
- Type: regional theatre
- Website: www.ardentheatre.org
Arden Theatre Company
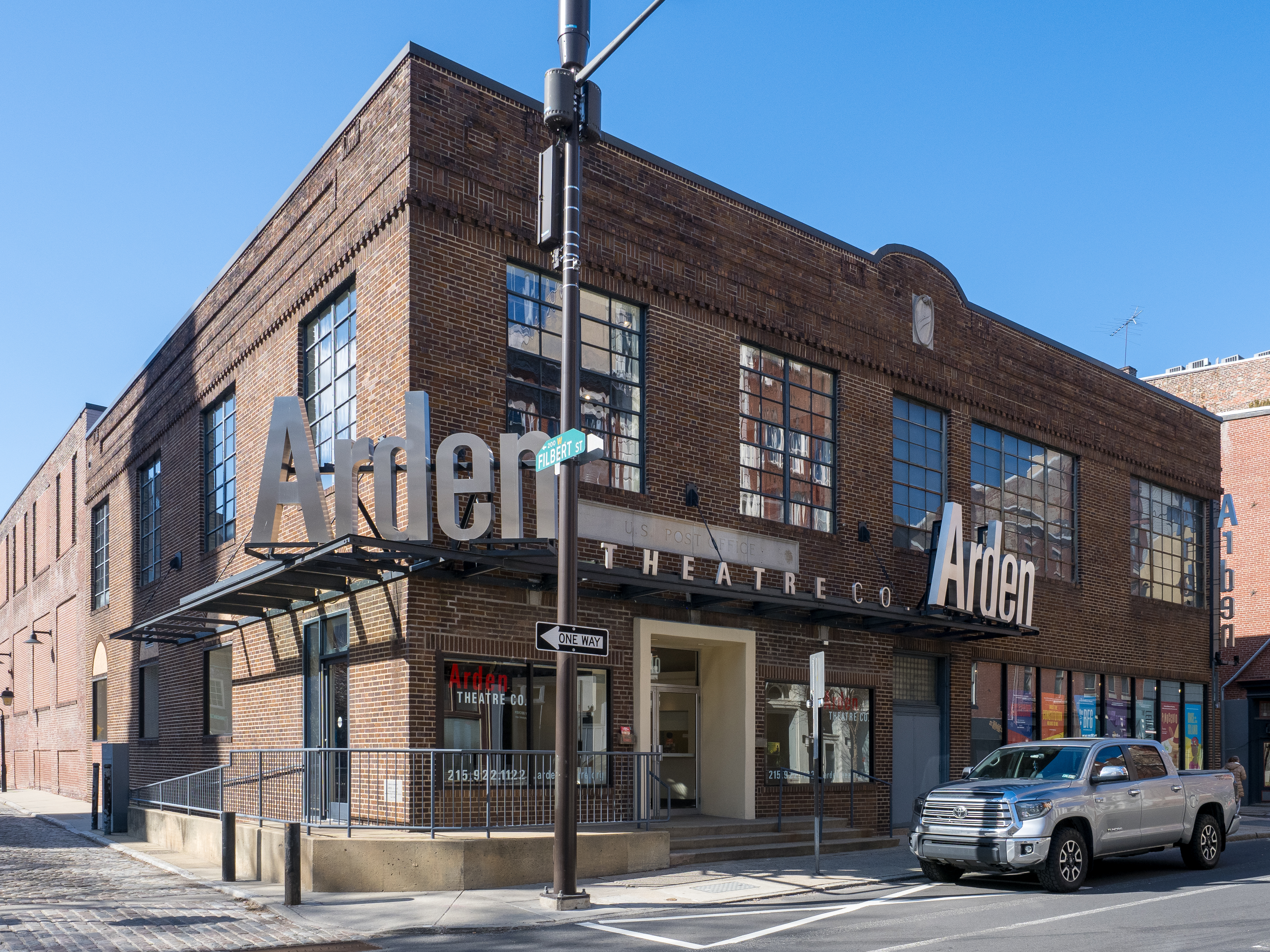
- The Arden Theatre in 2024
- Interactive map of Arden Theatre Company
- Address: 40 North 2nd Street; Philadelphia, Pennsylvania; United States
- Coordinates: 39.953767°N 75.143609°W
- Capacity: F. Otto Haas: 360; Arcadia: 175
Hamilton Family Arts Center
- Interactive map of Hamilton Family Arts Center
- Address: 62 North 2nd Street; Philadelphia, Pennsylvania; United States
- Capacity: 100 (Bob and Selma Horan Studio Theatre)

The Arden Theatre Company is a professional regional theatre company located in Philadelphia, Pennsylvania. The company includes three theatres: the 175-seat Arcadia Stage and the 360-seat F. Otto Haas Stage, located in the main property at 40 N 2nd Street; and the 100-seat Bob and Selma Horan Studio Theater at the Hamilton Family Arts Center up the block at 62 N 2nd Street. In addition to the theater spaces, the two properties also house the Arden's administrative offices, production shops, rehearsal space, and classrooms for its educational programming through Arden Drama School.

== History ==
Founded in 1988 by Terrence J. Nolen, Amy Murphy, and Aaron Posner, the Arden Theatre Company began producing at the Walnut Street Theatre Studio. After the second season, the St. Stephen's Performing Arts Center was co-founded to provide a larger theatre (150 seats) and a unified location for classes, education programs, administrative offices, and production shops.

In 1994, Arden Theatre Company purchased a 50,000-square-foot (4,600 m^{2}) former post office building in Philadelphia's Old City neighborhood. The building was renovated to contain a 360-seat main stage theatre (F. Otto Haas Stage); a 175-seat studio theatre (Arcadia Stage); a bi-level lobby with box office, elevator, and restrooms; rehearsal and classroom space; and administrative and production offices. The company claimed that its move played a role in the economic revitalization of the area and during his term as Mayor, Ed Rendell said, "When I think of nonprofit organizations that are having a major economic impact on their neighborhoods, none comes to mind sooner than the Arden."

The company has produced over 90 professional productions with 24 world premiere productions among them. The Arden Theatre Company created the Independence Foundation New Play Showcase in 1999, with a goal of staging a new play every season as well as holding workshops and a free public reading of an additional new play. The theatre was awarded grants for past and future development of the arts.

== Education ==
The Arden Theatre company has an educational program included in the company's Arden Drama School.

== Awards ==
As of 2008, the Arden has received eight Philadelphia Magazine "Best of Philly" Awards, four "Theatre Company of the Year" citations from The Philadelphia Inquirer, and six Philadelphia City Paper Reader's choice Awards. Arden Theatre has also received 250 nominations and 53 awards from the Barrymore Awards for Excellence in Theater.

== Notable productions ==
- Third and Indiana (1997)
