= The Rhodopi International Theater Collective =

Annual Bulgarian theatrical event (2005–2012)

Coordinates: 41°35′N 24°42′E

RITC and RITL
- Interactive map of RITC and RITL
- Address: Smolyan; Bulgaria

Construction
- Opened: 2005
- Closed: 2012

The Rhodopi International Theater Collective (RITC) was the original name of the Leon Katz Rhodopi International Theatre Laboratory (RITL), an annual summer, month-long event for international theatre collaboration and development, which allowed professional participants to work with and train students and each other in distinct approaches from around the world. The name was changed in preparation for the 2009 session. The program operated under the previous name during the summers of 2005 to 2008.

Professionals, scholars, and students attended the Laboratory - to train, develop new work, and conduct research - representing theatre companies and conservatories in several countries throughout the six inhabited continents. Held primarily in Smolyan, Bulgaria, in the center of the Rhodopi Mountains (or Rhodope Mountains), and hosted at the Rodopa Drama Theater (RDT) complex, the Lab served as a meeting ground for international collaboration.

== Background ==
The Rhodopa Mountains is the mythological birthplace of Orpheus and the original terrain of the cult of Dionysus, thus a mythological birthplace of Western theatre and performance.

The Lab was co-directed by Bulgarian theatre director Peter Karapetkov and American theatre director Jared J. Stein. It was founded by Karapetkov, Stein, RDT Artistic Director Krustyo Krustev, and American dramaturg Benjamin Nadler, who all collaborated at the RDT previously. In 2004, they led the RDT to partner with the Krastyo Sarafov National Academy for Theatre and Film Arts (NATFA) in Sofia, the Center for Research in Engineering, Media and Performance (REMAP) at the University of California, Los Angeles, and the University of Zagreb's Academy of Dramatic Art to present the 2005 RITC.

UCLA REMAP's Executive Director Jeff Burke led workshops and collaborations every summer, directing teams of artists and researchers to experiment with emerging technologies and different forms of performance - made possible by multiple grants of support from the Trust for Mutual Understanding. NATFA's Alexander Iliev served as a performance anthropologist, movement director and resident artist for all eight of the summers.

Leon Katz was one of the original initiative's advisers and was a dramaturg and lecturer during the inaugural session in 2005. Other advisers included the Eugene O'Neill Theatre Center’s J Ranelli.

== Development ==
The program grew considerably as Italian dramaturg Sergio Costola (Southwestern University) and American director Jed Allen Harris (Carnegie Mellon School of Drama) joined as yearly contributors in 2006 and 2007 respectively. The changing of the name from Collective to Laboratory, and including Katz, occurred at the conclusion of the 2008 session, while the International Theatre Institute's Martha Coigney and the Center for International Theatre Development's Philip Arnoult were both in residence.

In 2010 the RDT merged with the company of the Dramatichen Theatre in Plovdiv (Drama Theatre Plovdiv or PDT) at the foot of the Rhodopa Mountains, and the unified company then operated facilities in both locations. In addition to the program's schedule of research trips throughout the region, for the last few years, the RITL held events of each session's performance schedule at the Plovdiv complex. Professional RDT or PDT company members participated in the Lab each summer.

The PDT and RDT complex were no longer connected as of the 2012 and final RITL session.

== Processes ==
Each Lab session consisted of multiple, intertwined professional development, training, and hybrid (professional-student) processes – connected by a set of parallel mythos chosen for each year - and yielded numerous works-in-progress.

Master teachers conducted intensive workshops in traditional drama, movement and object-based forms – such as Bharatha Natyam, the Cham Mysteries, Chinese Opera, Commedia dell'Arte, Dervish Dance, Kabuki, Pantomime, Kathakali, Karagoz, Kuruma Ningyo, Ngonpa, Noh, Topeng, Wayang Kulit and the accompanying Gamelan music – and modern approaches, such as those influenced by the Factory of the Eccentric Actor, Michael Chekhov, Vsevolod Meyerhold, Konstantin Stanislavski, Jerzy Grotowski and Tadashi Suzuki. Contemporary artists contributed ongoing work and professional practices.

The RITC/RITL developed performances that went on to subsequent productions, runs and tours. In the United States alone, Lab work was further developed and performed at the La MaMa Experimental Theatre Club, the Long Wharf Theatre, the McCarter Theater, and the Mixed Blood Theatre Company, among others. Plays developed at the Lab have been published and made available for production.

== Contributors ==
Long-term contributors included American poet Holly Karapetkova, American composer Jonathan Snipes, and Bulgarian scholar/director Damyan Popchristov (New York University).

Professional resident artists included American puppet artists Tom Lee and Matt Acheson, Vera Stoykova of the State Puppet Theatre in Varna, Bulgaria, Japanese composer/musician Yukio Tsuji, American producer Mara Isaacs, American performer/writer Yehuda Hyman, and Swedish playwright Aditi Kapil.

Former Lab students include professionals working throughout the world of theatre, including New York-based director May Adrales. Bulgarian director Stayko Murdjev was an RITC student while at NATFA and then became a professional resident artist, originating pieces at the Lab that he would further develop and re-stage for some of Bulgaria's most influential companies, appearing at festivals throughout Europe.

Among the many workshop directors were Ozden Akturk from Turkey, Piyal Bhattacharya from India, Dijana Milosevic of the DAH Theatre in Serbia, Nyoman Sedana (Indonesian Institute of Arts and the Indonesian State College of Arts), and Lopsang Tharchin (Tibet) of the Nyanang Phelgyeling Monastery in Nepal.

Russian actor Valery Garkalin and director Alexander Morfov (Komissarzhevskaya Drama Theatre in Russia and Ivan Vazov National Theatre in Bulgaria) were among the teaching artists the first year, with Morfov returning to teach in 2007.

Dostena Anguelova-Lavergne of the International Delphic Council lectured at multiple sessions. Japanese director/choreographer Izumi Ashizawa taught at the RITL in 2010 and 2012. During the 2006 RITC, teachers included Yasen Peyankov of the Steppenwolf Theatre Company and Sue-Ellen Case. Among those to have trained at the RITL is American actor Alexis Floyd, in 2012.

The program also arranged for its professional participants to provide workshops and contribute to collaborations at theaters and universities throughout Europe and the United States, e.g., Southwestern University, UCLA, Whittier College, and Carnegie Mellon University.
