= Jed Allen Harris =

American stage director (born 1951)

- Born: 1951 (age 74–75); Milwaukee, Wisconsin
- Occupation: Stage director

Jed Allen Harris (born 1951) is an American stage director. Harris has been teaching at the Carnegie Mellon School of Drama since 1990 and has been the Option Coordinator for Carnegie Mellon University's undergraduate John Wells BFA Directing program since 2008.

Born in Milwaukee in 1951 and raised in nearby Wauwatosa, Harris graduated with a BFA in Directing from the University of Wisconsin–Milwaukee. He worked as an actor and director in Milwaukee before moving to Pittsburgh in 1976 as a founding member of Theatre Express, which was led by artistic director William J. G. Turner. Harris would later earn an MFA in Directing from Carnegie Mellon.

For Theater Express (until 1980), as Associate Director of City Theatre (Pittsburgh) between 1981 and 2001, at Carnegie Mellon, and as a freelance director, Harris has directed some of Pittsburgh's most acclaimed productions over the last four decades. He has also directed and taught throughout the United States and Europe, and served as a primary workshop director for the Rhodopi International Theatre Laboratory between 2007 and 2012.
