= Relativity (play) =

2004 play by Cassandra Medley

- Broadway Play Publishing cover art
- Written by: Cassandra Medley
- Characters: Kalima; Claire; Malik; Dan; Leon; Iris
- Original language: English
- Subject: Melanin theory
- Genre: Drama
- Setting: Baltimore, Maryland; 2000

Premiere
- Date premiered: May 5, 2004
- Place premiered: Magic Theatre (2004); Ensemble Studio Theatre (2006); Southern Rep (2007)

Relativity is a play by Cassandra Medley. Originally commissioned by the Alfred P. Sloan Foundation in 2000. The play had its world premiere at the Magic Theatre in San Francisco, running from May 5 - June 20, 2004. The play was subsequently produced Off-Broadway by the Ensemble Studio Theatre running April 26 - May 14, 2006. The following year, the play made its southern premiere at the Southern Rep in New Orleans, Louisiana. Relativity won the 2006 August Wilson Playwriting Award.

The play follows Kalima, a young molecular geneticist at Johns Hopkins University whose research challenges her late father's notion of melanin theory, which posits that higher concentrations of melanin confer superior mental, physical, and spiritual attributes to people of color. Kalima's mother, Claire, remains a staunch advocate for her husband's work and is preparing to publish a book based on his findings. As Kalima's scientific discoveries contradict her family's legacy, she faces a profound ethical dilemma.

== Plot ==
Relativity follows Kalima, a young molecular geneticist at Johns Hopkins University, who finds herself at odds with her mother, Claire, over a controversial scientific theory. Claire, a staunch advocate of her late husband's research, upholds the belief that higher concentrations of melanin in individuals of African descent confer superior mental, physical, and spiritual attributes. She is preparing to publish a book promoting this theory. Kalima's own scientific findings, however, contradict this perspective, placing her in a moral quandary: should she challenge her family's legacy and potentially strain her relationship with her mother, or remain silent and compromise her scientific integrity? The play further complicates this dynamic by introducing Irma, Kalima's mentor, who urges her to publicly refute Claire's theory, and two male characters—friends and fellow scientists—who represent differing viewpoints in the debate. These characters serve to highlight the broader societal and ethical implications of the central conflict.

== Characters ==
- Claire
- Kalima
- Malik
- Dan
- Leon
- Iris

== Production history ==
=== Magic Theatre ===
Relativity had its world premiere at the Magic Theatre in San Francisco in 2004. Directed by Edris Cooper-Anifowoshe, the cast featured Crystal Noelle, Tonia Jackson, James Cutts, Jaxy Boyd, and Mujahid Abdul-Rashid.

=== Ensemble Studio Theatre ===
Relativity was subsequently produced Off-Broadway at the Ensemble Studio Theatre in 2006, running from April 26 - May 14. Directed by Talvin Wilks, the cast featured Melanie Nicholls-King, Anthony Craine, Elain Graham, Petronia Paley, and Kim Sullivan. The creative team included Maruti Evans (sets and lighting), Clint Ramos (costumes), Graham Johnson (lighting), and Maya Ciarrocchi (projections).

=== Southern Rep ===
Relativity had its southern premiere at the Southern Rep in New Orleans, Louisiana, running May 30 through June 24, 2007. Directed by Edris Cooper-Anifowoshe, the cast featured Troi Bechet, Trey Burvant, Donna Duplantier, Sharon London, and Lance Nichols. The creative team included Isabel and Moriah Curley-Clay (sets), Marty Sachs (sound & lights), and Michelle Bohn (costumes).

=== L.A. Theatre Works ===
In 2008, Relativity was adapted for radio by L.A. Theatre Works. Directed by Stuart K. Robinson, the cast featured Judyann Elder, Deidrie Henry, James Pickens Jr., Jason Ritter, Terrell Tilford, and Lorraine Toussaint.

Relativity was subsequently published by Broadway Play Publishing, and has been performed across the United States.

== Reception ==
The play's San Francisco received critical acclaim, with particular praise for Medley's writing, Wilks' direction, and the ensemble of actors. In reviewing the Magic Theatre production, Robert Hurwitt of The San Francisco Chronicle observed

“The dramatically compelling argument spins off sparks about stem cell research, race and the Human Genome Project. But the gripping heart of Cassandra Medley’s Relativity is a showdown between relatives in a battle of the umbilical cord … Relativity is a full-fledged drama bristling with challenging ideas and emotional complexity. It’s a brave play. Not only has Medley set her drama, as one character puts it, ‘on the cut of the cutting edge’ of research, but she’s also grappling with the very touchy subject of reverse racism … The mother-daughter bond is so tight, and so beautifully detailed in the writing … In Medley’s Relativity, passionate mass and intellectual energy equals pretty compelling drama.”

Reviews for the Off-Broadway production were slightly more mixed, with Neil Genzlinger of The New York Times noting

"Ensemble Studio Theater's First Light Festival, featuring plays that explore issues raised by science and technology, is always guaranteed to send audiences out with plenty to think about. "Relativity," the main offering this year, is no exception, and the production offers dandy fringe benefits to go along with the heady science: two dazzling performances and two especially dazzling scenes. The playwright, Cassandra Medley, seems to have a rather long laundry list of race- and science-related issues she wants to touch on and concocts a somewhat strained premise to get to them all. But the play is so entertaining and fast-moving under Talvin Wilks's direction that you're soon in a forgiving mood."

== Awards ==
Year	Association	Category	Recipient	Result	Ref.
2006	AUDELCO	Dramatic Production Of The Year	Ensemble Studio Theatre	Nominated	
2006	AUDELCO	August Wilson Playwriting Award	Cassandra Medley	Won	
2006	AUDELCO	Best Director	Talvin Wilks	Nominated	
