= Ashlie Atkinson =

American actress (born 1977)

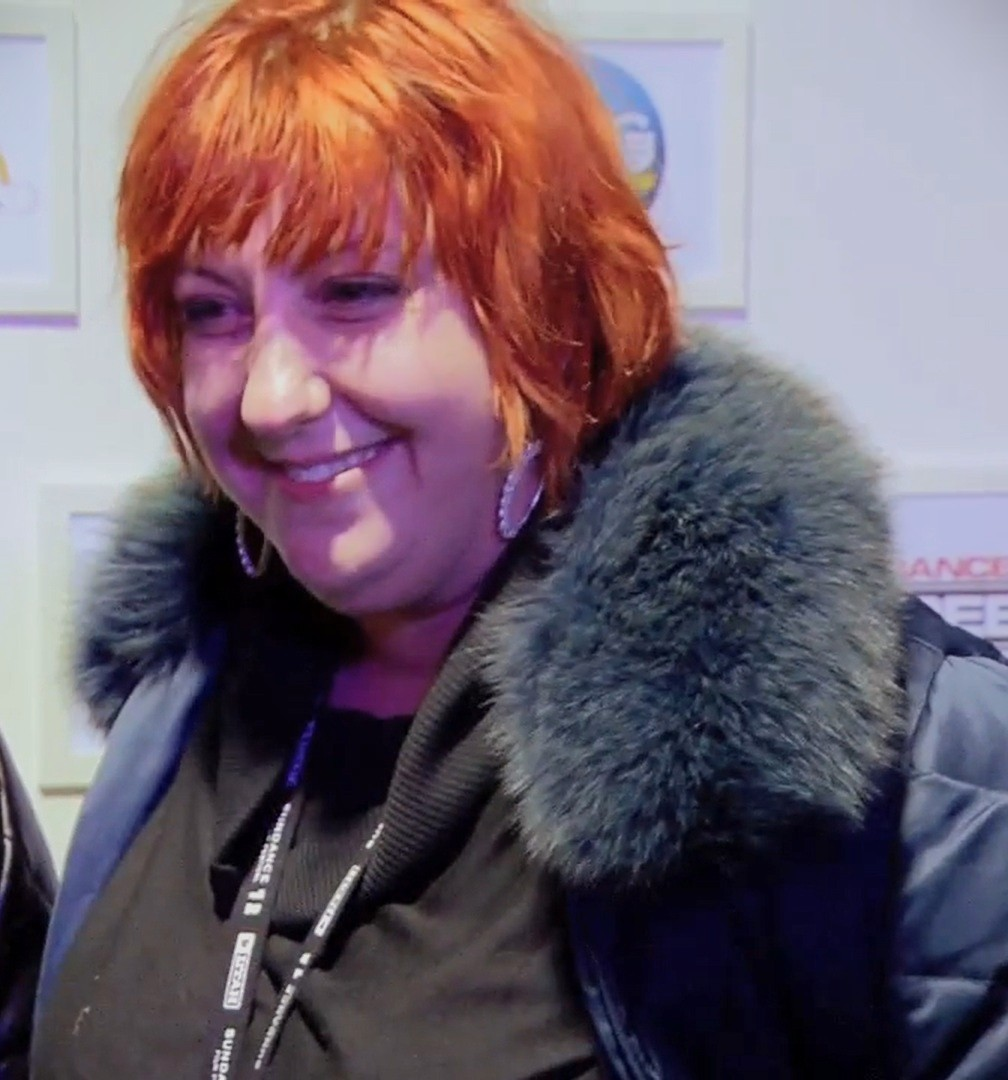
- Atkinson in 2012
- Born: Ashley Elizabeth Atkinson; August 6, 1977 (age 49); Little Rock, Arkansas U.S.
- Education: Hendrix College (BA)
- Occupation: Actress
- Years active: 2003–present
- Spouse: Leon Chase (m. 2015)

Ashley Elizabeth "Ashlie" Atkinson (born August 6, 1977) is an American character actress who works in movies, television, and theater. Atkinson is known for her work as Mamie Fish on The Gilded Age, Amanda in And Just Like That, Connie in the Spike Lee film BlacKkKlansman, and Janice in the fourth season of Mr. Robot.

== Early life and education ==
Atkinson was born on August 6, 1977 in Little Rock, Arkansas. Her father was a doctor and her mother was a nurse. Her family has lived in Arkansas for many generations.

In 1995, Atkinson graduated from Pulaski Academy in Little Rock, Arkansas. Atkinson attended Barnard College of Columbia University in New York City for three semesters but in 1996, moved back to Arkansas and eventually transferred to Hendrix College, where she had previously attended a summer program through Arkansas Governor's School for drama. In 2001, Atkinson graduated from Hendrix College with a degree in theater arts.

In 2003, after moving back to New York City when she was 24, Atkinson graduated from the Neighborhood Playhouse School of the Theatre. While at the Neighborhood Playhouse, she studied the Meisner technique.

== Career ==
=== Film and television ===
While at the Neighborhood Playhouse School, director Jace Alexander saw Atkinson perform in a showcase there. This led to a 2004 guest starring appearance in the TV show Law & Order and a six-episode arc in the Denis Leary TV series, Rescue Me.

Atkinson then starred in a breakout role as Helen, the sweet-faced, plus-size librarian in Neil LaBute's 2004 off-Broadway play Fat Pig. The role garnered her a Theatre World Award for Outstanding Off-Broadway Debut, as well as nominations for both a Lucille Lortel Award and an Outer Critics Circle Award.

In 2007, Atkinson appeared in a Broadway revival of the Terrence McNally play, The Ritz.

In 2011, Atkinson hit the three guest star appearance in the Law & Order franchise, following her 2005 debut on the original Law & Order with a 2007 appearance on Law & Order: Criminal Intent, and then in 2011 both Law & Order: Criminal Intent and Law & Order: Special Victims Unit.

In 2012, Atkinson guest starred on the TV series Boardwalk Empire as Gyp's wife, Gianconda Rosetti. She appeared on a 2012 episode of 30 Rock.

In 2013, Atkinson portrayed Rochelle Applebaum in the Martin Scorsese film The Wolf of Wall Street.

In 2013 and 2014, Atkinson had a four episode arc in the TV show, F to 7th. From 2013 to 2014, she was featured on the American remake of Gavin and Stacey, called Us & Them in the role of Nessa.

In 2018, Atkinson played the role of Connie Kendrickson in the Academy Award-winning film BlacKkKlansman, directed by Spike Lee. She had previously worked with Lee in the 2006 Denzel Washington film, Inside Man. Atkinson also worked alongside Lee's sister Joie Lee, contributing sound work on his 2008 WWII drama, Miracle at St. Anna. Also in 2018, Atkinson had a recurring role on the TV series, One Dollar.

From 2018 to 2019, Atkinson was Ace, Internal Affairs Detective, in four episodes of the Syfy TV show Happy!, a live-action/adult animated black comedy/action-drama television series.

In 2019, Atkinson portrayed Mrs. Fosse in the mini-series Fosse/Verdon. She had a two episode arc in the 2019 Allison Tolman thriller Emergence and played a trucker in the ensemble opposite Alfre Woodard in the Netflix movie, Juanita.

And also in 2019, Atkinson was on the fourth and final season of Mr. Robot, playing the character Janice.

Since 2022, Atkinson has played the social doyenne and influencer Mamie Fish in The Gilded Age on HBO.

=== Other work ===
From 2003, Atkinson is a former skater and long-time member of the 5-time world champion Gotham Girls roller derby team under the name of "Margaret Thrasher (Prime Minister of Your Demise)", although she has since retired.

In 2004, Atkinson appeared in the music video for the Kings of Leon song, "Four Kicks" off their album Aha Shake Heartbreak.

In 2006, Atkinson became the face of a fictional character called Chunky Pam. Her character, Chunky Pam, was featured in three videos: in a Christmas promotion for MTV called "Merry X.X.X.L.M.A.S. (Pam I Am)", in a Valentine's Day promotion called "Pampered", and a one-off music video titled "Dirrrty Jerzy", in which she raps about being from New Jersey.

In 2016, Atkinson appeared in the Ubisoft video game Watch Dogs 2 as Lenni.

In 2017, Atkinson starred as Dakota "Dak" Prentiss in a 14-episode noir science fiction thriller audio drama podcast called Steal the Stars, the story of two government employees guarding the biggest secret in the world: a crashed UFO.

== Personal life ==
In 2015, Atkinson married filmmaker and musician Leon Chase. The couple were married at the Arkansas music venue the White Water Tavern and live in Brooklyn.

== Filmography ==
=== Film ===
Year	Title	Role	Notes
2006	Inside Man	Mobile Command Officer Berk	
2006	Another Gay Movie	Muffler	
2006	Puccini for Beginners	Woman on Park Bench	
2007	Margot at the Wedding	Becky	
2008	The Guitar	Receptionist	
2008	Quid Pro Quo	Candy	
2008	Another Gay Sequel: Gays Gone Wild!	Muffler	
2008	Last Call	Donna	
2009	The Invention of Lying	Bank Teller	
2009	Hungry Years	Martha	
2009	When the Evening Comes	Angie	
2010	13	Margot	Uncredited
2010	BearCity	Amy	
2010	Eat Pray Love	Bookstore Girl	
2010	An Invisible Sign	Lisa's Aunt	
2010	All Good Things	Bonnie Felder	
2012	My Best Day	Meagan	
2012	Compliance	Marti	
2013	He's Way More Famous Than You	Gina	
2013	Remedy	Mistress Nadine	
2013	Cold Comes the Night	Social worker	
2013	The Wolf of Wall Street	Rochelle Applebaum	
2014	Lyle	Therapist	
2015	Bridge of Spies	Classroom Teacher	
2016	Certain Women	Secretary	
2016	The Lennon Report	Deartra Sato	
2016	Blood Stripe	Barb	
2017	The Outcasts	Interviewer	
2017	Nowhere, Michigan	Erin	
2018	BlacKkKlansman	Connie Kendrickson	
2019	Adam	Bound Emcee	
2019	Juanita	Peaches	
2020	Before/During/After	Marcella the Line Cook	
2021	Small Engine Repair	Diane Swaino	
2025	The Lost Bus	Ruby	

=== Television ===
Year	Title	Role	Notes
2004	Law & Order	Wendy	Episode: "Darwinian"
2004–2005	Rescue Me	Theresa	6 episodes
2006	3 lbs	Nurse Rhonda	2 episodes
2006	The Wedding Album	unknown role	Television film
2007	Filthy Gorgeous	Peggy	Television film
2007	Me & Lee?	Melinda	Television film
2007, 2011	Law & Order: Criminal Intent	Lisa Kirby / Lisa Williams	2 episodes
2009	The Unusuals	Tanya Blanston	Episode: "The E.I.D."
2010	Louie	Teacher	Episode: "Pilot"
2011	Law & Order: Special Victims Unit	Rachel Gray	Episode: "Pursuit"
2011	Bored to Death	Distraught Mom	Episode: "The Black Clock of Time"
2012	Game Change	Plump Woman	Television film; uncredited
2012	Boardwalk Empire	Gianconda Rosetti - Gyp's Wife	Episode: "Sunday Best"
2012	30 Rock	Theresa	Episode: "Mazel Tov, Dummies!"
2013	Your Pretty Face Is Going to Hell	Moon Rabbit	Episode: "Schmickler83!"
2013–2014	F to 7th	Alex	4 episodes
2014	The Actress	Discussion Circle Leader	Episode: "Unemployment"
2014	Nurse Jackie	Kim	Episode: "Rat on a Cheeto"
2014	High Maintenance	Female Coach	Episode: "Ruth"
2014	Stuck on A	Maurice	9 episodes
2014–2015	Us & Them	Nessa	7 episodes
2014, 2018	Elementary	Gay	2 episodes
2015	The Good Wife	Octavia Howe	Episode: "Payback"
2015–2019	Blue Bloods	Sandra Colby	3 episodes
2016	Above Average Presents	Alumni Rep	Episode: "The Bothering"
2016	Odd Mom Out	Patty	2 episodes
2016	Divorce	Woman	Episode: "Détente"
2017	Crashing	Schmitty	2 episodes
2018	Bull	Kendall Tyler	Episode: "Kill Shot"
2018	Jessica Jones	Mavis	Episode: "AKA Start at the Beginning"
2018	One Dollar	Terri Mitchell	9 episodes
2018–2019	Happy!	Ace / Internal Affairs Detective	4 episodes
2019	Fosse/Verdon	Mrs. Fosse	Episode: "All I Care About Is Love"
2019	Emergence	April	2 episodes
2019	Mr. Robot	Janice	5 episodes
2019	The Marvelous Mrs. Maisel	Peggy	2 episodes
2019–2020	New Amsterdam	Jackie Connor	2 episodes
2020	Prodigal Son	Leanne	Episode: "Death's Door"
2021	Zoey's Extraordinary Playlist	Nova	Episode: "Zoey's Extraordinary Mystery"
2021	Impeachment: American Crime Story	Juanita Broaddrick	3 episodes
2022–2023	And Just Like That...	Amanda	3 episodes
2022–2023	The Gilded Age	Mamie Fish	8 episodes
2023–2024	American Horror Story: Delicate	Susan Pratt	4 episodes
2025	The Gilded Age	Mamie Fish	4 episodes

== Awards ==
- 2005: Theatre World Award, Outstanding Off-Broadway Debut for Fat Pig
- 2005: Lucille Lortel Award (nominee), Outstanding Lead Actress for Fat Pig
- 2005: Outer Critics Circle Award, Outstanding Featured Actress in a Play (nominee), for Fat Pig
- 2014: Hendrix College, Outstanding Young Alumnus Award
- 2023: Screen Actors Guild Awards, Outstanding Performance by an Ensemble in a Drama Series (nomination), for The Gilded Age

== Selected theater ==
- 2005: The 24 Hour Plays – as Winnie
- 2005: Fat Pig by Neil LaBute – as Helen (Lucille Lortel Theatre)
- 2005: Making Marilyn – as Marilyn Monroe (Bridge Theatre Company at Theatre 54)
- 2005: The Butcher of Baraboo by Marisa Wegrzyn – as Midge (Second Stage Theatre)
- 2007: The Ritz by Terrence McNally – as Vivian Proclo (Roundabout Theatre)
- 2010: As You Like It by William Shakespeare (The Bridge Project)
- 2010: The Tempest by William Shakespeare (The Bridge Project)
- 2010: Psychomachia by Jennifer Lane – as Lydia (Theatre 54 @ Shelter Studios)
- 2011: The Book Club Play by Karen Zacarías (Arena Stage)
- 2013: January Joiner: A Weight Loss Horror Comedy by Laura Jacqmin – as Terry (Long Wharf Theatre)
- 2014: Love, Loss, and What I Wore by Nora and Delia Ephron (Rubicon Theatre Company)
- 2015: Steve by Mark Gerrard – as Carrie (Pershing Square Signature Center / The Romulus Linney Courtyard Theatre)
- 2016: The Forgotten Woman by Jonathan Tolins (Bay Street Theater)
- 2017: Imogen Says Nothing by Aditi Kapil (Yale Rep at Binger Center for New Theatre)
