= Ghost character =

Non-speaking characters in plays

A ghost character, in the bibliographic or scholarly study of texts of dramatic literature, is a term for an inadvertent error committed by the playwright in the act of writing. It is a character who is mentioned as appearing on stage, but who does not do anything, and who seems to have no purpose. As Kristian Smidt put it, they are characters that are "introduced in stage directions or briefly mentioned in dialogue who have no speaking parts and do not otherwise manifest their presence". It is generally interpreted as an author's mistake, indicative of an unresolved revision to the text. If the character was intended to appear and say nothing, it is assumed this would be made clear in the playscript.

The term is used in regard to Elizabethan and Jacobean plays, including the works of William Shakespeare, all of which may have existed in different revisions leading to publication. The occurrence of a ghost character in a manuscript may be evidence that the published version of a play was taken by the printer directly from an author's foul papers.

A ghost character should not be confused with an unseen character, a character who is not portrayed but who is relevant to the plot and to whom the play intentionally makes reference, e.g. Godot from Samuel Beckett's Waiting for Godot. A ghost character is also different from the character represented by an extra (background actor or supernumerary actor).

== Shakespeare's ghost characters ==
- Violenta, All's Well That Ends Well, a character who enters with the Widow in act 3, scene 5, possibly another daughter of the Widow and sister to Diana.
- Lamprius, Antony and Cleopatra, act 1, scene 2. Some editors assume this is the name of the Soothsayer, but the Soothsayer is implied to be Egyptian in act 2, scene 3. Meanwhile Plutarch names one Lamprias as his (Plutarch's) own grandfather.
- Rannius, Antony and Cleopatra, also in act 1, scene 2
- Lucillius, Antony and Cleopatra, an attendant of Enobarbus in act 1, scene 2.
- Fauconbridge, Henry IV, Part 2, act 1, scene 3, mentioned as a conspirator accompanying the Archbishop.
- Blunt, Henry IV, Part 2, act 3, scene 1
- Kent, Henry IV, Part 2, act 4, scene 2 (Folio)/scene 3 (Oxford/Arden)/scene 4 (Capell), accompanies the entry of the King, Clarence, and Gloucester
- Beaumont, Henry V. He is one of the casualties in the Battle of Agincourt, noted in act 3, scene 5 and listed as a casualty in act 4, scene 8. He is in the stage direction at the beginning of act 4, scene 2, suggesting Shakespeare wanted to develop the character further, but never did.
- Petruchio, Romeo and Juliet, companion of Tybalt at the fight in act 3, scene 1, also mentioned as attending the Capulets' banquet in act 1, scene 5. Some editions, such as the Oxford/Norton, give him the line "Away, Tybalt", which other editors render as a stage direction. He appears in the 1996 Baz Luhrmann film, played by Carlos Martín Manzo Otálora.
- Mercer, Timon of Athens, a guest at Timon's banquet in act 1, scene 1, presumably seeking Timon's patronage. The Norton/Oxford edition adds a stage direction for him to cross stage and exit.

=== Innogen (Much Ado About Nothing) ===
Modern versions of Much Ado About Nothing open act 1, scene 1 with the stage direction "Enter Leonato, Governor of Messina, Hero his daughter, and Beatrice his niece, with a Messenger." In the first quarto edition (Q1, 1600) however, the stage direction includes, after Leonato, "Innogen his wife". Similarly, in the stage directions for act 2, scene 1, Leonato is followed by "his wife". (Note: In the stage directions for act 2, scene 1, there is also "a kinsman" that has no other apparent role in the play. Claire McEachern, in The Arden Shakespeare third series edition of the play, speculates that this "kinsman" might be the same person Leonato mentions to Antonio in act 1, scene 2: "where is my cousin your son? Hath he provided this music?" However, by act 5, scene 1 Leonato claims that "My brother hath a daughter, ... And she alone is heir to both of us." and in act 4, scene 1, when Benedick has refused to kill Claudio, Beatrice makes no mention of a brother or cousin that might take up the task.) This "Innogen" is mentioned nowhere else in the play, and during Leonato's denunciation of Hero in act 4, scene 1, where it would be natural for her mother to speak or act in some fashion, Shakespeare appears to either have forgotten about her or decided that a father–motherless daughter dyad worked better dramatically. As the editors of The Cambridge Shakespeare (1863) put it: "It is impossible to conceive that Hero's mother should have been present during the scenes in which the happiness and honour of her daughter were at issue, without taking a part, or being once referred to." Some productions restore the character of Innogen, including the Wyndham's Theatre's 2011 production, giving her many of the lines of Hero's uncle Antonio. In 2017 playwright Aditi Brennan Kapil wrote the play Imogen Says Nothing: The Annotated Life of Imogen of Messina, last sighted in the First Folio of William Shakespeare's Much Adoe About Nothing which explores the reasons why Imogen/Innogen may have been included in Much Ado About Nothing.

=== Valentine (Romeo and Juliet) ===
Valentine is a ghost character in Romeo and Juliet. In act 1, scene 2, Romeo assists an illiterate Capulet servant by reading the list of guests for Lord Capulet's feast, and among the "dozen or so named guests with their unnamed but listed daughters, beauteous sisters, and lovely nieces" is listed "Mercutio and his brother Valentine". Mercutio appears on stage regularly until his death in act 3, scene 1 and is "almost as central a character as Juliet or Romeo, for his death is the keystone of the plot's structure", but Valentine is only mentioned the once in the guest list. The only time it is possible for the character to appear on stage is as one of the crowd of guests at the feast in act 1, scene 5, but if he is, there is nothing in the text to suggest his presence.

While not mentioned in a stage direction as such, Joseph A. Porter considers him to be "a kind of ghost character" like others in Shakespeare's plays, due to his strong connection with Mercutio that differentiates him from the other people mentioned in the guest list, and a possible significance to the plot and characters that is greater than superficially apparent. Shakespeare's immediate source in writing Romeo and Juliet was the narrative poem The Tragical History of Romeus and Juliet (1562) by Arthur Brooke, and here Mercutio is a very minor character and is presented as a competitor to Romeus (Romeo) for Juliet's affection, rather than as his friend. Porter argues that when Shakespeare dramatised the poem and expanded Mercutio's role, he introduced a brother for him in order to suggest a more fraternal character. Shakespeare appears to be the first dramatist to have used the name Valentine prior to Romeo and Juliet, but he himself had actually used the name previously. (Note: Twice, but the first was a kinsman of Titus with a single non-speaking appearance in Titus Andronicus.) (Note: Shakespeare may have picked up the name from Valentine and Orson, a romance associated with the Matter of France and the, now lost, 14th-century chanson de geste Valentin et Sansnom. Porter finds some similarities between Orson, Valentine's lost brother that has been raised by a bear, and Shakespeare's Mercutio, suggesting possible mirroring between the Orson–Valentine and Mercutio–Valentine dyads. This association of the name with brotherhood may also have been strengthened by Valentinian I (321–375) and Valens (328–378), brothers who concurrently ruled the Western and Eastern Roman Empire and frequently issued joint edicts.) In The Two Gentlemen of Verona, a play about two brothers and also set in Verona, Valentine is a true and constant lover and Proteus is a fickle one. While not primarily based on it, The Two Gentlemen of Verona adapts several incidents from Brooke's poem, and in all these instances Valentine's role is based on Romeus'. Thus, when adapting the Mercutio–Juliet–Romeus constellation from Brooke, by changing Mercutio from an amorous rival into a friend–brother to Romeo and a "scoffer at love", Shakespeare also rearranged the relationships into Mercutio–Romeo–Juliet, making Romeo the focus and removing Mercutio as a threat to his courtship of Juliet.

== Other authors ==
Four characters in John Webster's The White Devil, Christophero, Farnese, Guid-Antonio, and Little Jaques the Moor, have sometimes been referred to as ghost characters because they have no lines in the play.

George Peele's The Famous Chronicle of King Edward the First (1593) includes four characters mentioned in stage directions but not given any lines: Signor de Montfort, Earl of Leicester (l. 40), Charles de Montfort (l. 40), a nonexistent brother, Potter (l. 2247), and Mary, Duchess of Lancaster (l. 1453), another non-existent historical figure.

== Notes and references ==
=== Sources ===
- Bloom, Harold, ed. (2000). William Shakespeare's Romeo and Juliet. Modern Critical Interpretations. Philadelphia: Chelsea House. ISBN 0-7910-5662-7.
- Boyce, Charles (1990). White, David Allen (ed.). Shakespeare A to Z: The Essential Reference to His Plays, His Poems, His Life and Times, and More. Literary A to Z. Facts on File. ISBN 9780816018055.
- Clark, William George; Wright, William Aldis, eds. (1863). The Cambridge Shakespeare. Vol. II. Cambridge: Cambridge University Press. doi:10.1017/CBO9780511701207. ISBN 9780511701207 – via Cambridge Core.
- Hosley, Richard, ed. (1954) [first published 1917]. The Tragedy of Romeo and Juliet. The Yale Shakespeare (revised ed.). New Haven: Yale University Press. hdl:2027/mdp.39015054267862. OCLC 572840900.
- McEachern, Claire, ed. (2007). Much Ado About Nothing. The Arden Shakespeare, third series. Bloomsbury. doi:10.5040/9781408160220.00000052. ISBN 978-1-9034-3683-7.
- Porter, Joseph A. (1984). "Mercutio's Brother". South Atlantic Review. 49 (4). South Atlantic Modern Language Association: 31–41. doi:10.2307/3199586. eISSN 2325-7970. ISSN 0277-335X. JSTOR 3199586.
- Smidt, Kristian (1980). "Shakespeare's absent characters". English Studies. 61 (5). Taylor & Francis: 397–407. doi:10.1080/00138388008598068. eISSN 1744-4217. ISSN 0013-838X.
- Weis, René, ed. (2012). Romeo and Juliet. The Arden Shakespeare, third series. Bloomsbury Publishing. doi:10.5040/9781408160152.00000039. ISBN 9781903436912.
- Wells, Stanley (1980). "Editorial Treatment of Foul-Paper Texts: Much Ado about Nothing as Test Case". The Review of English Studies. New Series. 31 (121). Oxford University Press: 1–16. doi:10.1093/res/XXXI.121.1. eISSN 1471-6968. ISSN 0034-6551. JSTOR 514047.
- Wiggins, Martin (1997). "Conjuring the Ghosts of The White Devil". The Review of English Studies. New Series. 48 (192). Oxford University Press: 448–470. doi:10.1093/res/XLVIII.192.448. eISSN 1471-6968. ISSN 0034-6551. JSTOR 518492.
