= Alexander Iliev =

Alexander Iliev (Bulgarian: Александър Илиев) was a Bulgarian mime, physical theatre director, anthropologist and professor.

== Biography ==
Iliev conducted workshops, contributed to numerous publications and documentaries, and led research and training expeditions throughout the world, related to both performance and anthropology. He held and has broke his own Guinness Book records for highest mime performance (near Everest), and has also set and broke his own Guinness Book records for longest solo mime.

He served on the Krastyo Sarafov National Academy for Theatre and Film Arts faculty since 1984. His book, Towards a Theory of MIME, was translated into English and published by Routledge in 2014. In addition to creating his own pieces, often pulling from traditional theatre forms, Iliev has served as an actor, movement coach, and fight choreographer on productions for other directors, including Alexander Morfov. Between 2005 and 2012, he was a primary workshop director, lecturer and guide for the Rhodopi International Theatre Laboratory.

Born in Sofia on 1st of October 1956, Iliev first studied Computer Engineering at the Technical University of Sofia, earning a bachelor's degree, but would then go on to earn a bachelor's, master's, and doctorate from the Krastyo Sarafov National Academy for Theatre and Film Arts. Traveling throughout the world, Iliev also trained extensively in Commedia dell'arte, Chinese Opera, various forms of puppetry and other traditional theatre approaches and martial arts.

Prof.Dr. Alexander Iliev died on 25th of April 2024.
