= Shenka Popova =

Bulgarian actress (1866–1913)

- Шенка Попова
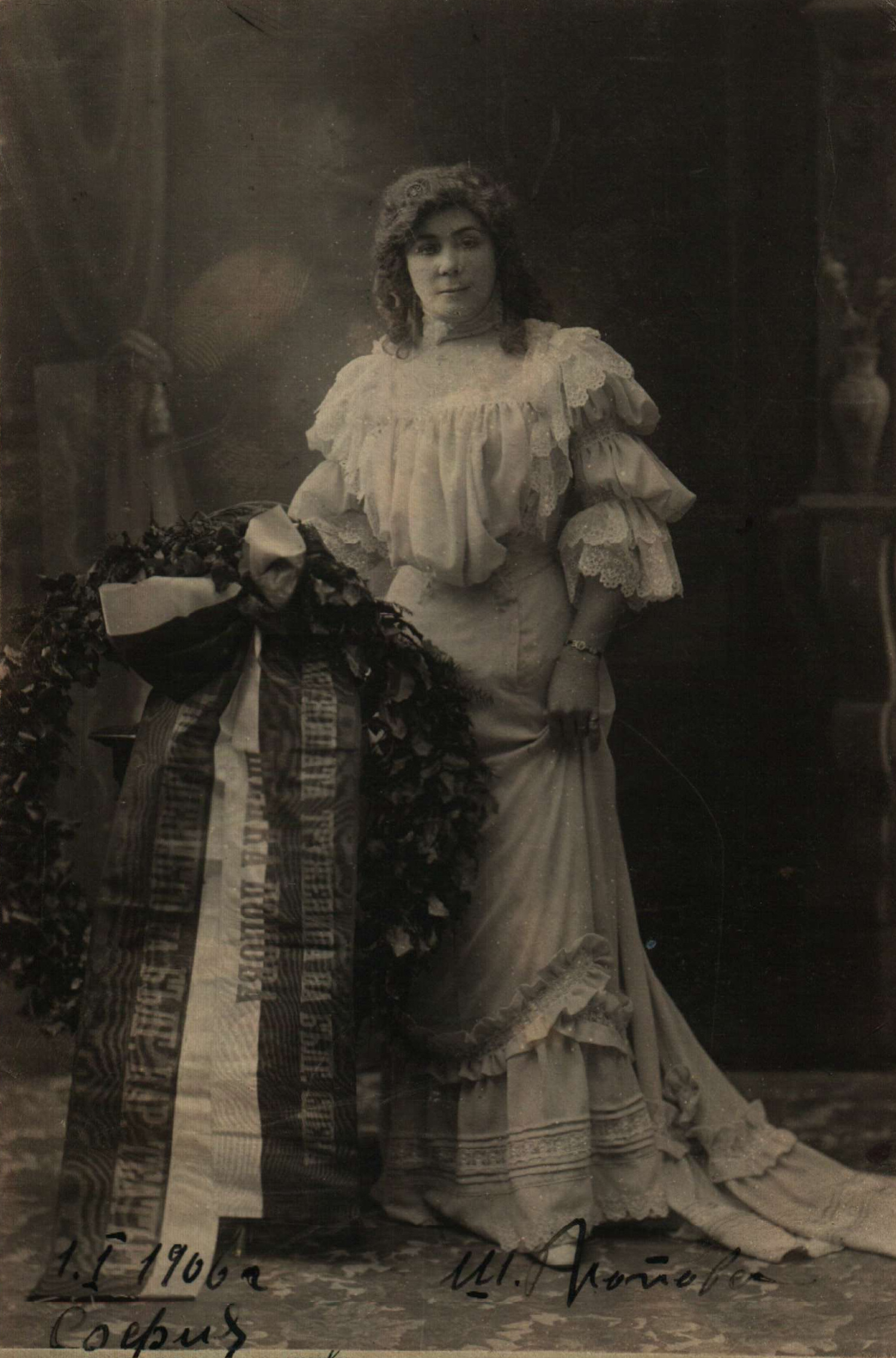
- Popova in 1906
- Born: 1866; Pazardzhik, Ottoman Bulgaria
- Died: 21 August 1913 (aged 46–47); Sofia, Kingdom of Bulgaria
- Occupation: Actress
- Years active: 1885–1913

Shenka Atanasova Popova (Bulgarian: Шенка Атанасова Попова; 1866 – 21 August 1913) was a Bulgarian actress. One of the first Bulgarian professional actresses, Popova belongs to the first generation of actors in the Ivan Vazov National Theater.

== Biography ==
Shenka Popova was born in 1866 in Pazardzhik, Ottoman Bulgaria (present-day Bulgaria). Popova joined the theatrical troupe of Plovdiv (then part of Eastern Rumelia) in 1884 along with Stefan Popov. They acted together in other theatrical troupes as well.

Between 1888 and 1891 she acted in the theater "Osnova". The period between 1893 and 1904 she dedicated to theater "Salza i Smyah"

In 1904 she began acting in the Ivan Vazov National Theater until 1911.

She belonged to the founding troupe of the national theater, the so-called first generation of Bulgarian actors. The first generation of actors in the National theater performed the plays in the community hall while the building was in construction.

== Major roles ==
- Fevronia – "Inspector" by Nikolai Gogol;
- Elmira – "Tartuffe" by Molière;
- Katerina – "Storm" by Alexander Ostrovsky;
- Marina – "Uncle Vanyo" by Anton Chekhov;
- Baba Kera – "Ivanko" by Vasil Drumev;
- Queen Theodora – "Towards the Abyss" by Ivan Vazov.

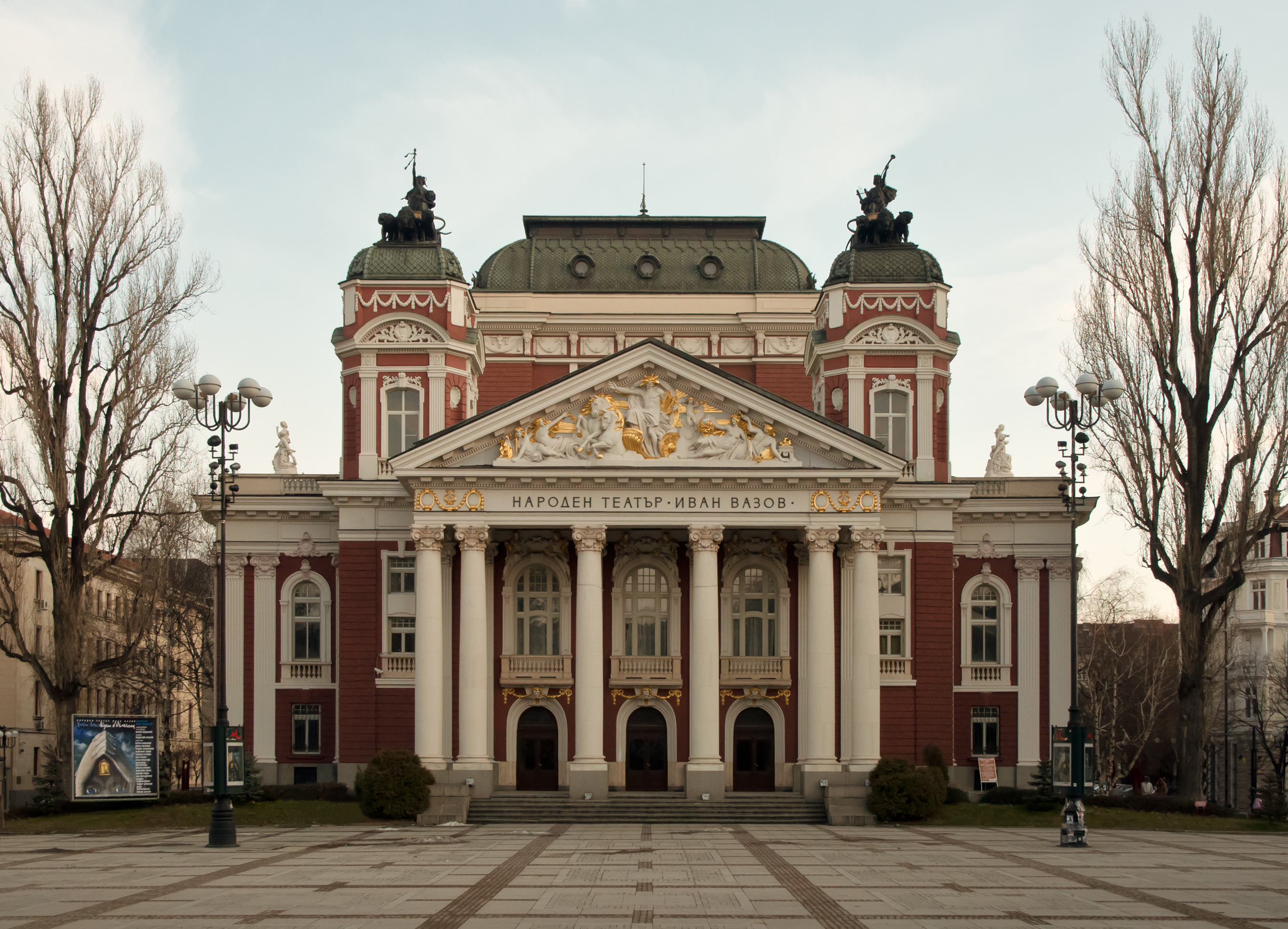
The Ivan Vazov National Theatre
