= Laowang =

Play written by Alex Lin

Laowang: A Chinatown King Lear
- Written by: Alex Lin
- Based on: King Lear

Premiere
- Date premiered: November 16, 2025
- Place premiered: 59E59 Theaters, Manhattan, New York City
- Directed by: Joshua Kahan Brody

Laowang: A Chinatown King Lear is a play written by Alex Lin and directed by Joshua Kahan Brody. Part of 59E59 Theaters' winter 2025–2026 season, it reinterprets King Lear in Chinatown, Manhattan.

== History ==
A cast and crew was announced on October 2, 2025. The show officially opened on November 16 and ran through to December 14.

== Cast ==
- Cindy Cheung as Amy Choy and others
- Wai Ching Ho as A-Poh
- Amy Keum as Lai-Fa Choy and others
- Jon Norman Schneider as Steven Choy
- Daisuke Tsuji as Wesley Chiu and others

== Critical reception ==
TheaterMania lauded Lin's writing and Brody's direction, as well as "Sharp performances" from the cast.

Exeunt concluded that "Rewriting King Lear (or any canonical text) is a high-risk, high-reward strategy" and felt that Laowang fell short in developing its characters, keeping its tone and modernism consistent, and otherwise tackling the source material imaginatively.
