= Melanin theory =

Black supremacist, pseudoscientific theory

Melanin theory is a set of pseudoscientific claims made by some proponents of Afrocentrism, which holds that black people, including ancient Egyptians, have superior mental, physical, and paranormal powers because they have higher levels of melanin, the primary skin pigment in humans.

== Claims ==
Melanin theory posits that individuals' responses to social stimuli are determined by the prevalence of the skin pigment melanin. Historian Stephen Ferguson describes melanin theory as a component of "strong" Afrocentrism, which assigns biological causes to social phenomena such as white supremacy. Proponents of melanin theory ("melanists") argue that insecurity among European males leads to efforts to socially dominate and emasculate African males, taking the form of unemployment, incarceration, and political and social marginalization.

Some black supremacists, including professor of black studies Leonard Jeffries and psychologist Frances Cress Welsing, argue without evidence that higher levels of melanin give black people inherently superior qualities to white people, including supernatural abilities such as extrasensory perception. According to Bernard Ortiz de Montellano, "the alleged properties of melanin, mostly unsupported, irrelevant, or distortions of the scientific literature, are [...] used to justify Afrocentric assertions. One of the most common is that humans evolved as blacks in Africa, and that whites are mutants (albinos, or melanin recessives)". Ortiz de Montellano wrote in 1993 that melanin theory as an ideological movement would increase scientific illiteracy and would contribute to "widening the gap between the races".

Welsing states that Africans possess dominant genes in comparison to the recessive genes of Europeans, which, she posits, leads to a struggle by Europeans to maintain their genetic distinctness. Welsing derived her hypothesis partly through a neo-Freudian analysis of cultural symbols rather than scientific evidence, arguing that the motivation for white supremacy is an unconscious response to white genetic and sexual inferiority. Ferguson equates this argument with "white male penis envy" toward black men.

== In popular culture ==
In 2006, the views of adherents and critics of melanin theory were dramatized in Cassandra Medley's play Relativity.

== See also ==
- The Bell Curve
- Race and intelligence
- Scientific racism
- Skin colour § Genetics
