= City Garden (Sofia) =

Public garden in Sofia, Bulgaria

Coordinates: 42°41′42″N 23°19′31″E

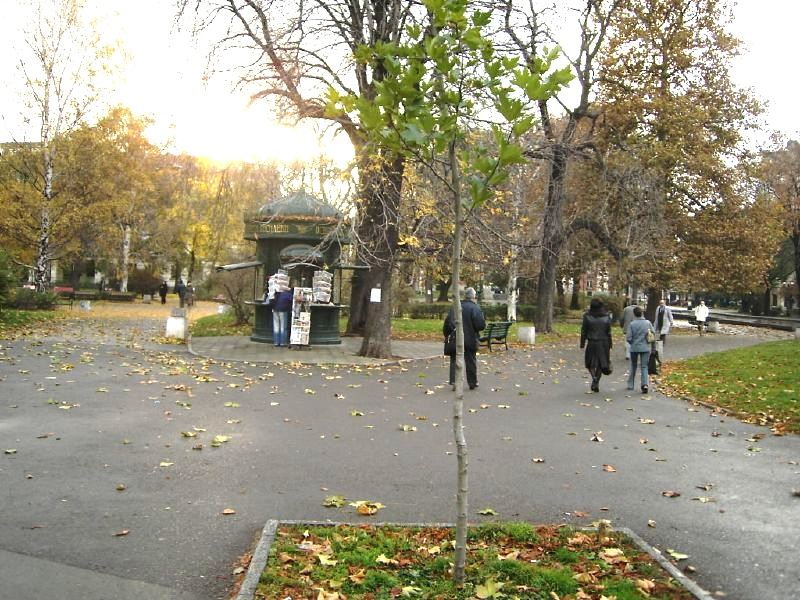
View of the city garden in the morning with an Art Nouveau kiosk selling foreign press in the centre

The City Garden (Bulgarian: Градска градина, Gradska gradina) is Sofia, the capital of Bulgaria's oldest and most central public garden, in existence since 1872. It is located between Tsar Osvoboditel Boulevard to the north, Knyaz Alexander Battenberg Street to the west and Joseph Vladimirovich Gourko Street to the south, in the historical centre of the city.

Originally arranged in the last years of the Ottoman rule of Bulgaria, it was radically transformed immediately after the Liberation of Bulgaria in 1878 and the choice of Sofia as the capital the following year under the city architect Antonín Kolář on the initiative of the temporary governor Pyotr Alabin. The alley network was reorganized, new plants were added, as well as a low wooden fence, a coffeehouse and a kiosk for musicians. The garden was initially named the Alexander II Garden in honour of Russian tsar Alexander II, who initiated the Russo-Turkish War of 1877-78, which led to the Liberation of Bulgaria.

Until the end of the 19th century the City Garden was repeatedly reorganized and further developed. Among the noted gardeners that worked on it were Karl Betz, Daniel Neff and Iliya Todorov, who shaped the garden's appearance that it would retain until the Second World War.

The construction of the now-demolished Georgi Dimitrov Mausoleum soon after the beginning of Communist rule of Bulgaria after the war was followed by multiple fundamental reorganizations, such as in 1951 and 1959 by Sugarev and R. Robev, 1976 and 1978 by A. Agura. These led to the orientation of the garden not towards the former royal palace as previously, but towards the Ivan Vazov National Theatre. The new composition was often in conflict with the initial planning and the City Garden lost territory and key architectural elements in the period.

Today the City Garden is not only a popular retreat for the residents of the capital, but also a favoured place for amateur chess players, who can be regularly seen in the small garden in front of the National Theatre. It was also the place where a group of around 300 people gathered on 27 August 1895 to climb Cherni vrah in Vitosha led by the writer Aleko Konstantinov on what is regarded as the birth date of tourism in Bulgaria.
