= Aditi Kapil =

American playwright

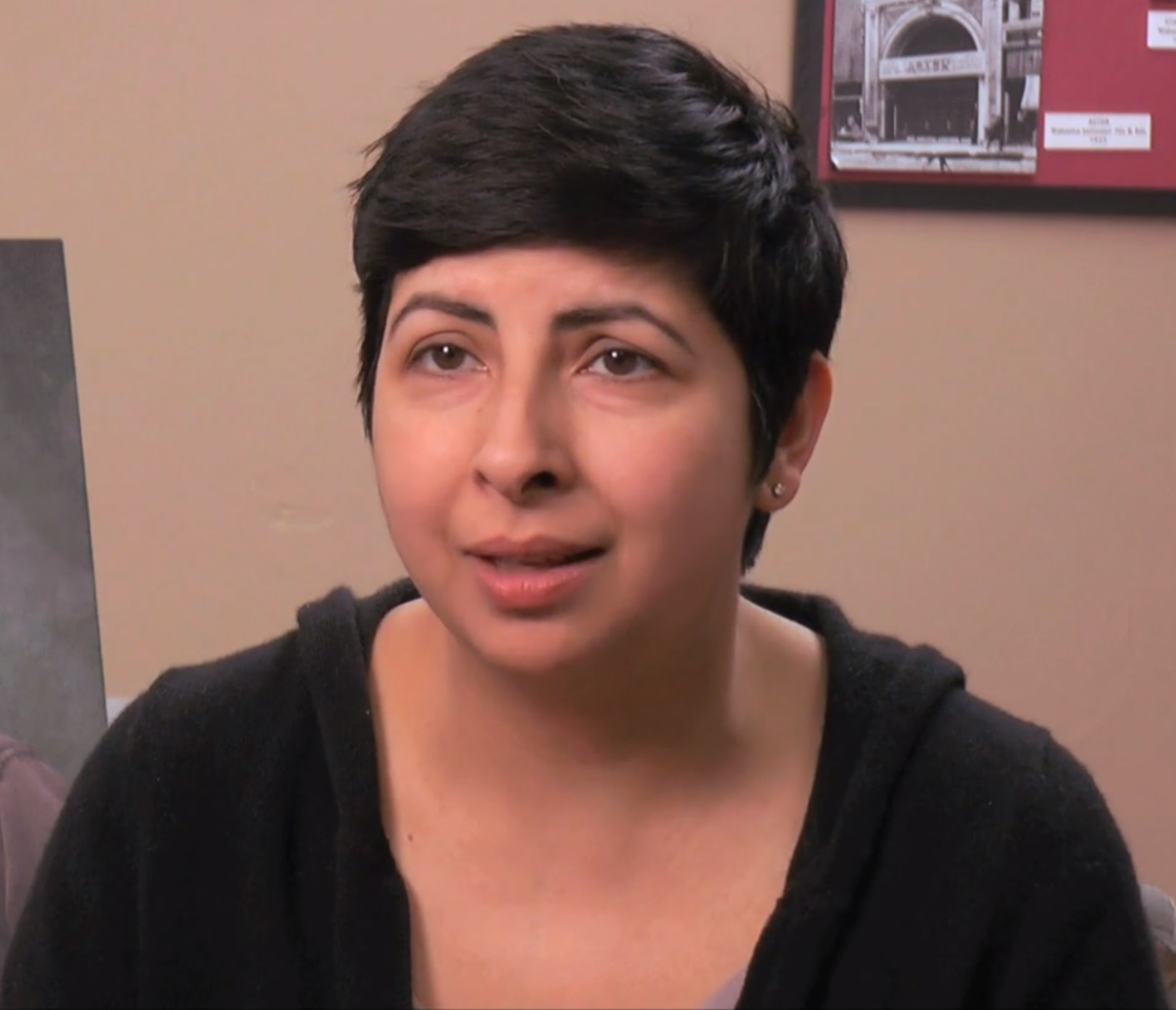
- Kapil speaks about Love Person in 2016
- Born: Sofia, Bulgaria
- Education: Macalester College
- Occupations: Playwright; director; actress; screenwriter
- Spouse: Sean Brennan
- Children: 3
- Writing career
- Notable works: Love Person; Imogen Says Nothing; The Displaced Hindu Gods Trilogy; Orange; Agnes Under the Big Top, a tall tale

Aditi Brennan Kapil is an American playwright and screenwriter.

Kapil has had plays commissioned from Yale Repertory Theatre (Imogen Says Nothing), La Jolla Playhouse (Brahman/i), South Coast Repertory Theatre (Orange), Mixed Blood Theatre (The Displaced Hindu Gods Trilogy, Agnes Under the Big Top, and Love Person), and the Oregon Shakespeare Festival (translating Measure for Measure with dramaturg Liz Engelman and an American Revolutions commission). She is a Mellon Playwright-in-Residence at Mixed Blood Theatre, an artistic associate at Park Square Theatre, a Core Writer at The Playwrights' Center, and a Resident Writer at New Dramatists.

== Early life ==
Kapil is of Indian descent and was born in Sofia, Bulgaria. She grew up in Sweden before moving to Minnesota to attend Macalester College. At Macalester, she intended on becoming a journalist until the college's only journalism professor died. She was taking an acting class at the time, and that introduction to the theater stuck. Kapil graduated with a B.A. in English and Dramatic Arts.

== Career ==
Kapil began her professional career in theater as a Twin Cities actress. She became a playwright at the encouragement of Jack Reuler, founder of the Mixed Blood Theatre. In addition to her career as an actress, playwright, and director, she has worked with Mixed Blood's artistic director Jack Reuler to curate a list of plays about people with disabilities as a part of Mixed Blood's Disability Visibility Project, which seeks to support disabled actors as well as ensure that stories of disabled individuals continue to have a space on stage. In 2000, Kapil was awarded a grant from the Jerome Foundation for two months travel in India with her father, Satie Kumar Kapil, an award-winning Punjabi poet. The purpose of the trip was to trace her family history in Punjab and meet with other Indian novelists, poets, artists, and cultural sociologists.

=== Playwriting ===
Kapil's first play, Deaf Duckling, debuted in 2006 at the Mixed Blood Theatre. Kapil's play Gotama (2006), written at the request of director Andy Kim and designer Masanari Kawahara, opened at In the Heart of the Beast Puppet and Mask Theatre in Minneapolis. At the same time, her play The Adventures of Hanuman, King of the Monkeys debuted at Stepping Stone Theatre for Youth Development in St. Paul. Hanuman is a Bollywood-style musical based on the ancient Indian epic Ramayana, told from a child's perspective. This play was followed by Chitrangada: The Girl Prince for SteppingStone Theatre for Youth in 2008. This play is told in iambic verse based on an episode in the Mahabharata. In 2007, Kapil also directed and co-wrote the play Messy Utopia with Seema Sueko, Velina Hasu-Houston, Janet Allard, and Naomi Iizuka. A three-year residency grant from the Mellon Foundation, which included salary and benefits, allowed her to work as the playwright in residence at Mixed Blood. This grant was awarded through the National Playwright Residency Program, administered by HowlRound. Kapil was among the first cohort of this grant in 2013. During this residency, she debuted The Displaced Hindu Gods Trilogy at the end of 2013. The trilogy contains modern characters inspired by the Hindu deities Brahma, Vishnu, and Shiva. Kapil's piece, Doe (2015), debuted as part of The Car Plays, a multi-author work commissioned by the La Jolla Playhouse that consisted of mini-plays staged in cars. In 2016, Kapil wrote an adaptation of Mitali Perkin's novel Rickshaw Girl for its run at the Children's Creativity Museum Theater in San Francisco. Kapil's play Orange also had its world premiere at Mixed Blood. In 2016, her grant from the Mellon Foundation was renewed for another three years.

=== Directing ===
In 2001, Kapil directed The Primary English Class at the Mixed Blood Theatre. The play is written by Israel Horovitz in 1976, and it tells the story of a group of immigrants in an ESL class. According to Horovitz, the play is "a meditation on America's paternalistic attitudes abroad." This particular production was in response to tensions post 9/11. In 2005, Kapil directed Queen of the Remote Control by Sujata Bhatt at Mixed Blood. In 2009, she directed Ruined at Mixed Blood. In 2011, Kapil directed an all-female, all-deaf production of Gruesome Playground Injuries at Mixed Blood. In 2015, she directed the world premiere of Dean Poyner's Stepping Out of the River at Dawn at Mixed Blood Theatre. The play, inspired by a photograph entitled "Young Negress Stepping Out of the River at Dawn," tells the story of a Rwandan couple, Alyze and Martin, living in America and trying to honor tradition with their wedding. She also directed The Other Place, a play by Sharr White, at Park Square Theatre in St. Paul. The play focuses on a neuroscientist named Smithton, who is "simultaneously on the verge of a breakthrough and a breakdown." The play embodies themes of reality versus illusion.

=== Acting ===
In 2006, Kapil acted in Sez She, a play by Jane Martin, at Illusion Theater. In the same year, she also acted in Vestibular Sense, a play by Ken LaZebnik about autism. In 2008, she acted in Distracted at Mixed Blood, a play by Lisa Loomer addressing how people with ADD and ADHD are treated. In 2012, Kapil acted in Next to Normal at Mixed Blood Theatre. The play explores a mother's struggle with bipolar disorder. Kapil also played the character Mary O'Malley in Learn to be Latina at Mixed Blood. In 2013, she acted in the opening weekend of her play Brahman/i as the titular character. In 2014, she played the character Corryn Fell in Gidion's Knot at the Pillsbury House Theatre.

== Plays ==
=== Love Person ===
Love Person is performed in English, American Sign Language, and Sanskrit. It takes its name from the character Maggie, who is trying to translate the word “lovers” to her female love interest, Vic, in ASL. There is no direct translation, so “love person” is the closest equivalent. The plot tells the story of this lesbian couple. The play won the 2009 Stavis Playwriting Award.

Love Person was developed during a Many Voices Residency at the Playwrights' Center, work-shopped at the Lark Play Development Center in NY, and selected for reading at the National New Play Network (NNPN) Conference 2006. The play received a “rolling world premiere” from National New Play Network; the work premiered at Mixed Blood Theatre, Marin Theatre, and Phoenix Theatre, in the 2007/08 season. In 2008/09 it was produced at Live Girls! Theatre in Seattle, Alley Repertory Theatre in Boise, and Victory Gardens Theater in Chicago.

=== Agnes Under the Big Top, a tall tale ===
This play shows the intersecting lives of immigrants in a US city. Agnes is a Liberian immigrant and one of two health care workers who attend to Ella, an old woman with rheumatoid arthritis. Agnes finds she is dying of cancer and struggles to tell her young son, who is still in Liberia. Happy is a young Indian immigrant and former telemarketer. Roza is a withdrawn Bulgarian who only talks to birds. Shipkov is Roza's husband. He is a former ringmaster and is currently employed as a subway driver. Kapil uses this medley of characters to reflect on how where we live changes who we are. Her interest in this topic stems from being an immigrant twice over, being a Bulgarian-Indian in Sweden and later moving to the U.S. The play was named a Distinguished New Play Development project by the NEA New Play Development Program (as administered by Arena Stage). The play was developed by the Lark Play Development Center, Mixed Blood Theatre, InterAct Theatre, the Playwrights' Center (MN), and the Rhodope International Theater Laboratory. Agnes Under the Big Top premiered at Mixed Blood Theatre and Long Wharf Theatre in 2011 and Borderlands Theater (AZ) in 2012 in a NNPN rolling world premiere.

=== The Displaced Hindu Gods Trilogy ===
Kapil's Displaced Hindu Gods Trilogy consists of Brahman/i, a one-hijra stand-up comedy show, The Chronicles of Kalki, and Shiv. The plays draw on elements of Hinduism to tell the stories of three high schoolers. Each play is a full-length 80 to 90-minute show. The plays, based on the Hindu trinity of Brahma, Vishnu, and Shiva, premiered in repertory at Mixed Blood Theatre in October 2013 and have since been produced across the U.S. and in the U.K. The plays received some activist response from a Nevada-based organization for protecting Hinduism. The group claimed that Kapil trivializes the religion in this trilogy. Brahman/i and The Chronicles of Kalki received an unprecedented double nomination for the James Tait Black Prize (from the University of Edinburgh).

Brahman/i, a one-hijra stand-up comedy show
The main character is based on the Hindu god Brahma. Brahman/i is a sixth grader who discovers that he is intersex. He is a stand-up comedian and tells the play mostly from this perspective. Rohan Preston, a reviewer at Star Tribune, characterizes the play as being "all about self-creation." The play explores themes of gender through the main character who undergoes periods of time identifying as a boy, a girl, and then somewhere in between.

The Chronicles of Kalki
The play's titular character is based on the final avatar of the Hindu god Vishnu. Kalki is a sexually aggressive, modern feminist version of the Hindu deity, who has come to aid women victimized by sexual assault. Kapil, as an atheist who grew up with some education in Hinduism from her father, strives to make the religion more relevant to both herself and the audience today. The play is a comic-book-style play about a girl-gang of misfits. The play begins with a police interrogation of two nameless schoolgirls. The police want to know where their friend, Kalki, is. In a series of flashbacks, we learn that the trio shoplifted comic books, ridiculed a character in a Bollywood movie for sexual restraint, and jeered boys at a house party. However, the play is not trying to judge these characters, but rather illuminate the “moral unsteadiness of adolescent girls who lack a coherent value system.”

Shiv
This play's titular character is based on the Hindu god Shiva. Kapil calls the play "post-colonial," intended to explore the psychological residue left by colonialism. The play is a memory play in which Shiv recalls a compressed version of her childhood with her father, Bapu, a modernist poet based on Kapil’s father. Bapu left post-colonial India and immigrated to the U.S., and his perspective allows the legacy of Western colonialism to be a theme of the play. Central to the play is an old sofa bed mattress which Shiv uses to travel through time and space. There is also a romance between Shiv and Bapu’s publisher’s grandson. Bapu’s publisher is blamed for limiting Bapu’s career and shutting out non-Western works. In defending this view, Shiv throws away her romance with the publisher’s grandson. Rohan Preston, a reviewer at Star Tribune, characterizes the play as inspired by “the sparseness of [Samuel] Beckett with the magical realism of Gabriel Garcia Marquez.”

=== Orange ===
Orange is the story of an adventure through Orange County, told from the perspective of Leela, an Indian girl on the autism spectrum, like Kapil's daughter. The plot begins with Leela's cousin eloping with her boyfriend. The couple leaves a family wedding and decides to take Leela along. The play features illustrations, as the narrator sketches “life’s most important moments in her journal.” Kapil intended the play to address multiple audiences including those with autism and the Indian-American community. The CrossRoads Commissioning Project helped fund the development of this play. CrossRoads was launched in 2013 by the Time Warner Foundation to sponsor plays about Orange County's cultural diversity. The play was showcased in the 2015 Pacific Playwrights Festival before its debut in the 2016-2017 season at Mixed Blood and South Coast Repertory.

=== Imogen Says Nothing ===
This play is a revisionist comedy in verse and prose. Its titular character is inspired by Imogen, a character who only appears in the first folio of Shakespeare’s Much Ado About Nothing, speaks no lines, and is likely a typo. According to Kapil, it is “a play about the voices absent from our canon and the consequences of cutting them.” The play's development and production are funded by Yale’s Binger Center for New Theatre. The play won the 2016 Edgerton Foundation New Play Award. The play is set in London, at various dates and locations from 1598 onward. In the "Rules of the Universe" that precede the script, it is noted that the oppression of the bears in the play is because the humans have wrongly presumed their own superiority, though the bears are not actually inferior. The bears should have little visible differences from the humans. The rules also note that William Shakespeare is the least important person in the play.

=== Gotama ===
Gotama tells the story of Buddha's early life. The protagonist, Siddhatta Gotama, is a wealthy prince until he meets the sick and poor and is moved by compassion to give away all his possessions. He sets out on a journey in the search of his own humanity and peace and in the process becomes the Buddha.The play is narrated from the perspective of Channa, the prince's charioteer. The play starts at the end of the journey, with Channa begging Gotama to eat and end his fast.

=== Deaf Duckling ===
Deaf Duckling tells the story of a deaf child in a hearing family. The show uses American Sign Language and English. It was the first play Kapil wrote. It was workshopped in PlayLabs 2004 at the Playwrights’ Center of Minneapolis before premiering at Mixed Blood in the 2006-2007 season.

=== Cirkus Kalashikov ===
Cirkus Kalashikov is a 10-minute play inspired by Kapil's father and the stories he told her about the three jumpers and one dog he killed while he worked as a subway driver.

== Filmography ==
Year	Title	Credited as		Notes
Year	Title	Writer	Other	Notes
2019	American Gods	Yes	No	Wrote 2 episodes
2020	Away	Yes	Yes	Wrote: "Goodnight, Mars", also story editor
2022	Tom Clancy's Jack Ryan	No	Yes	Executive story editor
2023–present	Invasion	Yes	Yes	Wrote 4 episodes, also supervising producer
