= Daisuke Tsuji =

American actor

- 辻 大介
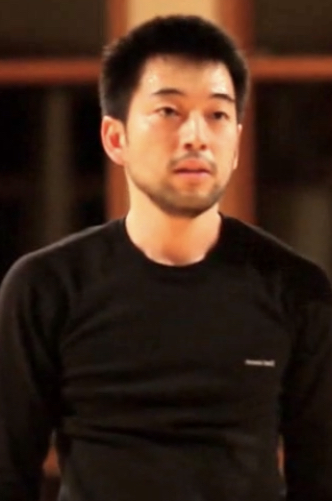
- Tsuji in 2009
- Born: Kuwait
- Education: UCLA (Theatre of Arts)
- Occupation: Actor
- Years active: 2006–present
- Father: Hirohiko Tsuji
- Awards: Los Angeles Drama Critics Circle Award (2019)
- Website: daisuketsuji.com

Daisuke Tsuji (辻 大介, Tsuji Daisuke) is an American actor. Tsuji is best known for his performance as Jin Sakai in the video game Ghost of Tsushima (2020) and as the Crown Prince Akihito in the TV series The Man in the High Castle (2015–2019).

== Early life ==
Daisuke was born in Kuwait to Japanese parents, where his father worked as an architect. His brother Hisayasu, or Yasu, Tsuji is a documentary producer and editor. At two years old Daisuke moved to Chiba in Japan and at eight years old he moved to Sacramento, California. He attended the Rio Americano High School and American River College. He earned a bachelor in Theatre Arts at UCLA.

== Career ==
Tsuji worked at The Coffee Bean & Tea Leaf in The Grove at Farmers Market in Los Angeles. He started working at two theatre companies, Tim Robbins' The Actors' Gang and The Three Chairs Theatre Company. He was a party clown before he became a professional clown at Cirque du Soleil. went on several tours in the US and internationally such as Speak Theater Arts' and Cirque du Soleil's Dralion. Tsuji created his own clown shows called Death and Giggles, Limerence, and Clowns are Peoples Too. In 2006, he played a cave soldier in Letters from Iwo Jima. In 2009, Tsuji wrote and directed Monkey Madness, which was produced by The Los Angeles Theatre Ensemble. The same year, he wrote and starred in Death and Giggles. In 2010, he became a company member of the Oregon Shakespeare Festival in 2010, and appeared in more than 10 productions. In 2013, he returned to Los Angeles to focus on television and films. In 2019, he was Chief Warrant Officer Lee in the Love, Death & Robots TV series on Netflix. He did voice acting for the video games Call of Duty: Black Ops 4 (2018) and Prey: Mooncrash (2018). In 2017, Tsuji played William Shakespeare in the three-act play Imogen Says Nothing.

In 2020, he was the voice actor and face of the protagonist Jin Sakai in the action-adventure game Ghost of Tsushima. He played the Crown Prince Akihito in the TV series The Man in the High Castle (2015–2019) on Amazon Prime. In 2019, he won the Los Angeles Drama Critics Circle Award for Outstanding Featured Performance in Cambodian Rock Band at South Coast Rep!.

== Filmography ==
=== Film ===
Year	Title	Role	Notes
2006	Letters from Iwo Jima	Cave Soldier No. 2	
2016	The God Chair	Eskimo Man	Short film
2018	Magic Sunset Hour	Aaron	Short film
2019	Jake and Kyle Get Wedding Dates	Kenji (voice)	Direct-to-video
2020	The Watch-ers	Bradley	Short film
2025	Smurfs	No Name Anime (voice)	
2026	The Rip	FBI Agent Logan Casiano	

=== Television ===
Year	Title	Role	Notes
2014	Homemade Movies	Dr. Ishiro Serizawa	Episode: "Godzilla Trailer"
2015	The Blacklist	Cambodian Carl	Episode: "Luther Braxton (No. 21)"
2015	The Man in the High Castle	Crown Prince	3 episodes
2017	Brockmire	Yoshi Takatsu	5 episodes
2019	Love, Death & Robots	Chief Warrant Officer Lee	Episode: "Lucky 13"
2021	Amphibia	Captain Bufo (voice)	Episode: "Barrel's Warhammer"
2021	D.P.	Ahn Joon-ho (voice)	6 episodes, English dub
2021	Invasion	Kaito Kawaguchi	8 episodes
2021	NCIS: Hawaiʻi	Major Mike Ito	9 episodes
2022	Action Pack	Mr. Chang (voice)	2 episodes
2022	Type S: Chiaki's Journey	Noboru (voice)	4 episodes
2024	Creature Commandos	Scorpion / Kuai Liang (voice)	Episode: "The Iron Pot"; Archival recording

=== Video games ===
Year	Title	Role	Notes	Source
2017–2018	Prey: Mooncrash	Li Phang / Ken Mizuki / Chao Wei, additional voices (2017)	Voices	
2018	Call of Duty: Black Ops 4	Specialist Recon	Voice	
2019	Death Stranding	The Musician	Voice	
2020	9 Monkeys of Shaolin	Wei Cheng	Voice	
2020	Ghost of Tsushima	Jin Sakai / Young Jin	English voice, likeness, motion capture performance	
2022	GhostWire: Tokyo	Man B	Voice	
2022	Call of Duty: Modern Warfare II	Hiro "Oni" Watanabe	Voice, PlayStation exclusive until 2023	
2023	Fortnite	Thunder	Uncredited role	
2023	Mortal Kombat 1	Scorpion / Kuai Liang	Voice	
2023	Mortal Kombat: Onslaught	Scorpion / Kuai Liang	Voice	
2024	Rise of the Rōnin	Toranosuke Shimada	Voice	
2025	Like a Dragon: Pirate Yakuza in Hawaii	Teruhiko Shigaki	Voice	
2025	Date Everything!	Daisuke	Voice	

== Stage ==
Year	Title	Role	Venue
2012	A Midsummer Night's Dream	Puck	Portland Center Stage
2013	King Lear	Fool	Oregon Shakespeare Festival
2014	The Orphan of Zhao	The Orphan of Zhao	American Conservatory Theater/La Jolla Playhouse
2017	Imogen Says Nothing	William Shakespeare/Warden	Yale Repertory Theatre
2019	All's Well That Ends Well	Bertram	Oregon Shakespeare Festival
2025	Laowang	Wesley	Primary Stages

== Awards and nominations ==
Award	Category	Title	Result
Los Angeles Drama Critics Circle Award (2019)	Outstanding Featured Performance	Cambodian Rock Band	Won
The Game Awards 2020	Best Performance	Jin Sakai (Ghost of Tsushima)	Nominated
Famitsu Dengeki Game Awards 2020	Best Actor	Jin Sakai (Ghost of Tsushima)	Won
British Academy Games Awards	Performer in a Leading Role	Jin Sakai (Ghost of Tsushima)	Nominated
