= Malik Gaines =

American writer, performance artist, and teacher (born 1973)

- Born: 1973 (age 51–52); Visalia, California, U.S.
- Occupations: Performance artist; writer; professor
- Father: Charles Gaines

Academic background
- Education: University of California, Los Angeles (BA, PhD); California Institute of the Arts (MFA)
- Doctoral advisor: Sue-Ellen Case

Malik Gaines (born 1973) is an American artist, writer, and professor. He is one of three members of the artist collective My Barbarian, the group formed in 2000 and includes Jade Gordon and Alexandro Segade as they perform musical, theatrical and critical techniques to act out social difficulties. They have exhibited internationally, including at the Whitney Museum, New York in 2021. Gaines's practice includes events and exhibitions, music composition, video work, scholarly research and collaboration. He is the author of the book Black Performance on the Outskirts of the Left: A History of the Impossible (2017, NYU Press) and is the co-artistic director of The Industry opera company in Los Angeles.

== Early life and education ==
Malik Gaines was born in 1973, in Visalia, California. His father is conceptual artist, Charles Gaines.

Gaines received a B.A. degree in history from the University of California, Los Angeles (1996), an MFA degree in writing from California Institute of the Arts' school of critical studies (1999), and a PhD in theater and performance studies from UCLA (2011). His doctoral advisor was Sue-Ellen Case.

== Career ==
Gaines is an associate professor in the department of performance studies at New York University; and is an associate professor at University of California, San Diego.

Alongside his performance practice, Gaines is a writer and scholar whose work has been published in Art Journal, Women & Performance, Artforum, and BOMB Magazine. Gaines has written essays for numerous exhibition catalogs and artist's books, for artists including Lorraine O’Grady, Jacolby Satterwhite, Nick Cave, Senga Nengudi, Judson Dance Theater, Paul Mpagi Sepuya, Julius Eastman, Wu Tsang, amongst others. Gaines has curated a number of performance programs and exhibitions, such as Made in L.A. at the Hammer Museum in 2012 and LAXART.

Gaines is the author of Black Performance on the Outskirts of the Left: A History of the Impossible, which analyzes black art and music in the 1960s to trace out how performances of blackness rescripts and retools dominant discourses which constrain and contain black life. Reading artists through three registers—blackness (which he calls the "vanguard of negativity, the avant-garde of difference"), the period of the 1960s, and the transnational routes between the United States, West Africa, and Western Europe—Gaines explores how the "destabilizing excess of difference" challenge visual representation across sexual, racial, and political lines. For instance, in the first chapter "Nina Simone's Quadruple Consciousness," Gaines riffs on W. E. B. Du Bois' double consciousness to explore Nina Simone's "performance position that marshals paradoxical and simultaneous differences to present a provisional form of subjectivity." Drawing from Simone's Four Women and her performance practice of interjection, Gaines locates the political affect of Simone's work through the tensions inherent to the spaces between the multiple narratives, singer, and audience, reworking gendered, racialized fragmentation towards an act of political and personal agency.

In 2021,The Whitney Museum and Institute of Contemporary Art, Los Angeles presented a 20-year survey of work by My Barbarian which included an exhibition, performance program, and a book publication.
