= Imogen Says Nothing =

2017 play by Aditi Kapil

- Written by: Aditi Kapil
- Characters: Imogen; John Heminges; Henry Condell; Alexander Cooke; Richard Burbage; William Shakespeare; Anna Roos; Crier; Isaac; Bear on Ice; Harry Hunks; Ned Whiting; Fluffy 1 Fluffy 2 Warden
- Genre: Comedy
- Setting: London

Premiere
- Date: January 20, 2017

Imogen Says Nothing: The Annotated Life of Imogen of Messina, last sighted in the First Folio of William Shakespeare's Much Adoe About Nothing is a three-act play by Aditi Brennan Kapil inspired by a ghost character in Shakespeare's Much Ado About Nothing. The play premiered on January 20, 2017 at the Yale Repertory Theatre.

== Characters ==
- Imogen, a bear disguised as a human
- John Heminges, an actor, plays Leonato in Much Ado About Nothing and a bear in The Winter's Tale
- Henry Condell, an actor, plays Don John in Much Ado About Nothing and Antigonus in The Winter's Tale
- Alexander Cooke, an actor, plays Beatrice in Much Ado About Nothing
- Nicholas Tooley, an actor, plays Hero in Much Ado About Nothing
- Richard Burbage, an actor, plays Don Pedro in Much Ado About Nothing
- William Shakespeare, an actor and playwright, plays Messenger and Friar in Much Ado About Nothing
- Warden
- Crier, owner of bears, plays Benedick and Conrade in Much Ado About Nothing
- Isaac
- Anna Roos, Queen Anne's Danish maid
- Bear on Ice
- Harry Hunks, a blind bear
- Ned Whiting, a bear
- Fluffy 1, a bear
- Fluffy 2, a bear

Imogen Says Nothing is written to be performed by a cast of 9 actors with double-cast roles. Anna Roos is to be played by the same actor as Bear on Ice, the Crier also plays Isaac, William Shakespeare and the Warden are to be played by the same actor, Richard Burbage's actor also plays Harry Hunks, Nicholas Tooley is to be played by the same actor as Fluffy 1, Alexander Cooke is to be played by the same actor as Fluffy 2, and John Heminges is written to be played by the same actor as plays Ned Whiting.

== Synopsis ==
Imogen, a bear disguising herself as a human, makes her way to a London theatre in 1598 to convince a mapmaker to reverse the name change to her hometown. In the theatre she meets John Heminges and Henry Condell whose theatre troupe she subsequently hangs around with. As the thespians prepare to perform Much Ado About Nothing for the first time, the actors realize that a drunk John Heminges will be unable to perform without someone to help him stand up. Henry suggests that Imogen go on stage as Leonato's wife so that he can hold on to her arm to keep steady. Imogen breaks London's laws against women performing on stage and goes on as Leonato's wife. After the performance, the actors and Imogen go to a tavern and share stories. Later, Imogen helps the players deconstruct the theatre and move it across the Thames. While crossing the frozen river, the group encounters a bear. Imogen talks to the bear in order to protect the actors.

The play briefly switches focus to a group of bears in a cage at the Paris Gardens. Henry and Imogen have sex, after which Henry invites Imogen to watch bear-baiting at the Gardens with the rest of the actors. While watching the bear-baiting, the Crier recognizes Imogen as a bear. Nicholas pretends to be Imogen's son and persuades the Crier that she is not a bear. Henry suggests to William Shakespeare that he should publish a folio edition of his plays. Imogen seeks out the bear cages but is caught by the Warden, who immediately recognizes her as a bear that escaped his captivity. Imogen frees the other bears but is caught by the Crier. The next morning, the players go to watch bear-baiting but only some of them recognize one of the bears as Imogen. Imogen asks them to kill her and Alexander eventually does. The players pretend that Alexander suffered a fit of madness in order to excuse his behaviour.

Act three jumps to 1613 when the King's Men are preparing to perform at the court of King James and Queen Anne. They are interrupted by Anne's maid Anna Roos who demands that Imogen, Leonato's wife, be included in the play. Anna encountered Imogen in the quarto edition of the text. The players agree to let Anna play Imogen. John sees a map on the wall featuring the real Imogen's hometown called according to its proper name. Shakespeare agrees to make the folio edition. The play ends in 1623. Henry rushes to the printers to put Imogen, who he removed from the text, back into the play. Imogen appears and eats Henry.

== Sources ==
Imogen Says Nothing's titular character, Imogen, comes from a ghost character in Shakespeare's comedy Much Ado About Nothing. In the First Folio, a character called Innogen appears in the stage directions but never speaks. The stage directions of act 1, scene 1 read "Enter Leonato Gouernour of Messina, Innogen his wife, He- / ro his daughter, and Beatrice his Neece, with a messenger." Innogen is a ghost character who many scholars assume is a remnant of Shakespeare's earlier ideas for the play but was later written out. Kapil reads the double 'n' of Innogen to be a misprint for an m, producing the name Imogen. At Macalester College, Kapil played the role of Imogen.

Imogen Says Nothing also plays on the line stage direction "He exits, pursued by a bear" in The Winter's Tale. The actors say they will perform The Winter's Tale after Much Ado About Nothing in act 3. The play also features many bears, including the titular Imogen.

The play features several characters inspired by real Elizabethan actors of the King's Men, including William Shakespeare. The author's notes to the play state that "William Shakespeare is the least important person in this play."

== Performance history ==
Imogen Says Nothing premiered on January 20, 2017 at the Yale Repertory Theatre, who also commissioned the play, in New Haven, Connecticut. Imogen was played by Ashlie Atkinson, Christopher Ryan Grant played John Heminges, Hubert Point-Du Jour played Henry Condell, Christopher Geary played Alexander Cooke, Ricardo Dávilla played Nicholas Tooley, Thom Sesma played Richard Burbage, Daisuke Tsuji played William Shakespeare, Ben Horner played the Crier, and Zenzi Williams played Anna Roos. The production was directed by Laurie Woolery.

San Diego City College's Dramatic Arts program staged a production of the play, directed by professor Kate Neff Stone, in Fall of 2022.

In the fall of 2023, The University of Michigan Department of Theatre and Drama staged Imogen Says Nothing. The play was directed by professor and professional freelance director Malcolm Tulip and was produced by University Productions.

Emerson College's Department of Performing Arts staged a production of the play in Fall of 2024 at the Paramount Theatre (Boston). The cast included Emma Lavenson and Louis Correro as understudies.
