= Us & Them (American TV series) =

American television series

- Genre: Sitcom
- Created by: David J. Rosen
- Based on: Gavin & Stacey by: James Corden; Ruth Jones
- Starring: Jason Ritter; Alexis Bledel; Dustin Ybarra; Ashlie Atkinson; Jane Kaczmarek; Kurt Fuller; Kerri Kenney-Silver; Michael Ian Black
- Country of origin: United States
- Original language: English
- No. of seasons: 1
- No. of episodes: 7

Production
- Executive producers: David J. Rosen; Steve Coogan; Jane Tranter; Julie Gardner; James Corden; Ruth Jones; Henry Normal
- Camera setup: Single-camera
- Production companies: Men of Science; BBC Worldwide Productions; Sony Pictures Television

Original release
- Network: Fox (unaired); Sony Crackle (2018)
- Release: October 1, 2018

Us & Them is an American sitcom based on the British series Gavin & Stacey created by James Corden and Ruth Jones. It was adapted for an American audience by David J. Rosen. The series was scheduled to premiere on Fox, as a mid-season replacement in the 2013–14 season; however, Fox did not air the series. Instead, streaming service Crackle streamed all seven episodes on October 1, 2018.

== Premise ==
After a six-month-long online romance, Gavin, who lives in New York, and Stacey, who lives in Pennsylvania, decide to meet in person. Their crazy families and friends constantly interfere in their budding relationship, which becomes more of a challenge than living in different states.

== Cast ==
- Jason Ritter as Gavin
- Alexis Bledel as Stacey
- Dustin Ybarra as Archie, Gavin's best friend
- Ashlie Atkinson as Nessa, Stacey's best friend
- Michael Ian Black as Brian, Stacey's uncle
- Jane Kaczmarek as Pam, Gavin's mother
- Kurt Fuller as Michael, Gavin's father
- Kerri Kenney-Silver as Gwen, Stacey's mother
- Aasif Mandvi as Dave Coaches, Nessa's ex and a security guard for the Dave Matthews Band

== Production and release ==
The series was scheduled to premiere on Fox as a mid-season replacement in the 2013–14 season. On May 8, 2013, Fox placed a thirteen-episode order for the single-camera comedy. On October 11, 2013, it was revealed that Fox had cut back the episode order to seven episodes. In 2014, Vulture revealed that Fox would not air the series. The series was first broadcast in South Africa on M-Net. Crackle, then known as Sony Crackle, began to stream all seven episodes starting October 1, 2018, in the United States.

== Episodes ==
No.	Title	Directed by	Written by	Original release date	Prod. code
1	"Pilot"	Michael Patrick Jann	David J. Rosen	October 1, 2018	100
A young couple trying to take their relationship to the next level must overcome their geographical differences as well as their eccentric group of friends and family.
2	"Crunch & Brunch"	Michael Patrick Jann	David J. Rosen	October 1, 2018	101
After Stacey causes an accident, her second date with Gavin is thrown off track. Their backup plan sparks an awkward introduction for their families.
3	"Snowmen & Wingmen"	Matt Sohn	Michael Glouberman	October 1, 2018	102
Gavin tries to win Gwen over by joining her for a karaoke night duet. Meanwhile, Michael and Pam argue over sex and widowhood.
4	"Together & Apart"	Michael Blieden	Andrew Gottlieb	October 1, 2018	103
On their first weekend apart, Gavin is having a boys' night out in New York with Archie, while Stacey and Nessa relive their favorite high school shenanigans back in Dillsburg.
5	"Corn & Cancer"	Jay Chandrasekhar	Mehar Sethi	October 1, 2018	104
Gwen runs a 5K in honor of her late husband and everyone turns out to support her. Stacey struggles with a secret she hasn't told Gavin.
6	"Coeds & Carburetors"	Tricia Brock	Margee Magee & Angeli Millan	October 1, 2018	105
Gavin and Stacey accompany Archie on a quest for his lost love. Nessa deals with her dad while Pam finds a date for Gwen.
7	"Upstairs & Downstairs"	Scott Ellis	Nancy Fichman & Jennifer Hoppe	October 1, 2018	106
On the eve of a party at their apartment, Archie claims that his cozy relationship with Stacey has rendered Gavin unfit for the task and insists on taking control.
