= Sue-Ellen Case =

American writer and academic (born 1942)

- Born: 1942 (age 83–84)
- Awards: Lambda Literary Award

Academic background
- Education: University of the Pacific, University of California, Berkeley, San Francisco State University
- Thesis: Development in post-Brechtian political theater : the plays of Heiner Müller (1981)

Academic work
- Institutions: University of California, Los Angeles
- Doctoral students: Malik Gaines

Sue-Ellen Case (born 1942) is Professor and Chair of Critical Studies in the Theatre Department in the School of Theater Film and Television at the University of California, Los Angeles. She has received Lifetime Achievement Awards from both the Association for Theatre in Higher Education and the American Society for Theatre Research, and won a Lambda Literary Award for her work Split Britches: Lesbian Practice/Feminist Performance.

== Education ==
Case studied music at the Conservatory of Music at the University of the Pacific, and earned a Bachelor of Arts and a Master of Arts from San Francisco State University. Case attended graduate school at the University of California, Berkeley, where she completed her doctoral studies on German playwright Heiner Müller.

== Academic career ==
Case has been an invited professor in residence at the University of Warwick, Stockholm University, and Swarthmore College, where she was the Eugene Lang Professor for Social Change. She was a Fulbright Scholar at the National University of Singapore. She has lectured at the Rhodopi International Theatre Laboratory. Case is currently a distinguished professor at the University of California, Los Angeles. Notable former students of Case include Malik Gaines. Case retired from teaching at UCLA in 2016 but continued her research.

Case has published several books, including Feminism and Theatre and The Domain-Matrix: Performing Lesbian at the End of Print Culture. Case has also edited several anthologies of critical works and play texts, including The Divided Home/Land: Contemporary German Women's Plays; Split Britches: Lesbian Practice/Feminist Performance, which won the 1996 Lambda Literary Award for Drama; Performing Feminisms: Feminist Critical Theory and Theatre, and many others. Along with Philip Brett and Susan Leigh Foster, she edits a book series with Indiana University Press entitled Unnatural Acts.

She has published more than forty-five articles, in journals such as Theatre Journal, Modern Drama, differences, and Theatre Research International and in many anthologies of critical works. Her many articles include "Making Butch: An Historical Memoir of the 1970s" in Butch/Femme: Inside Lesbian Genders (Cassell Academic Press, 1998) and corrected in "Toward a Butch-Feminist Retro-Future," published in the collection Queer Frontiers (University of Wisconsin Press, 2000). Professor Case's essay "Tracking the Vampire" (differences, 1991), which explores lesbian representation in film, has also been widely reprinted. In "Seduced and Abandoned: Chicanas and Lesbians in Representation," printed in the collection Negotiating Performance (Duke University Press, 1994), she argues for political affiliations across difference.

== Awards ==
In 2007 Case received a Lifetime Achievement Award from the American Society for Theatre Research. She was also awarded a Lifetime Achievement Award by the Association for Theatre in Higher Education in 2012. In 2010 the Women & Theatre Program+ Allied Feminist Coalition awarded Case an Achievement Award for Scholarship.

== See also ==
- Queer studies
- Queer theory
