= Mariyka Popova =

- Марийка Попова
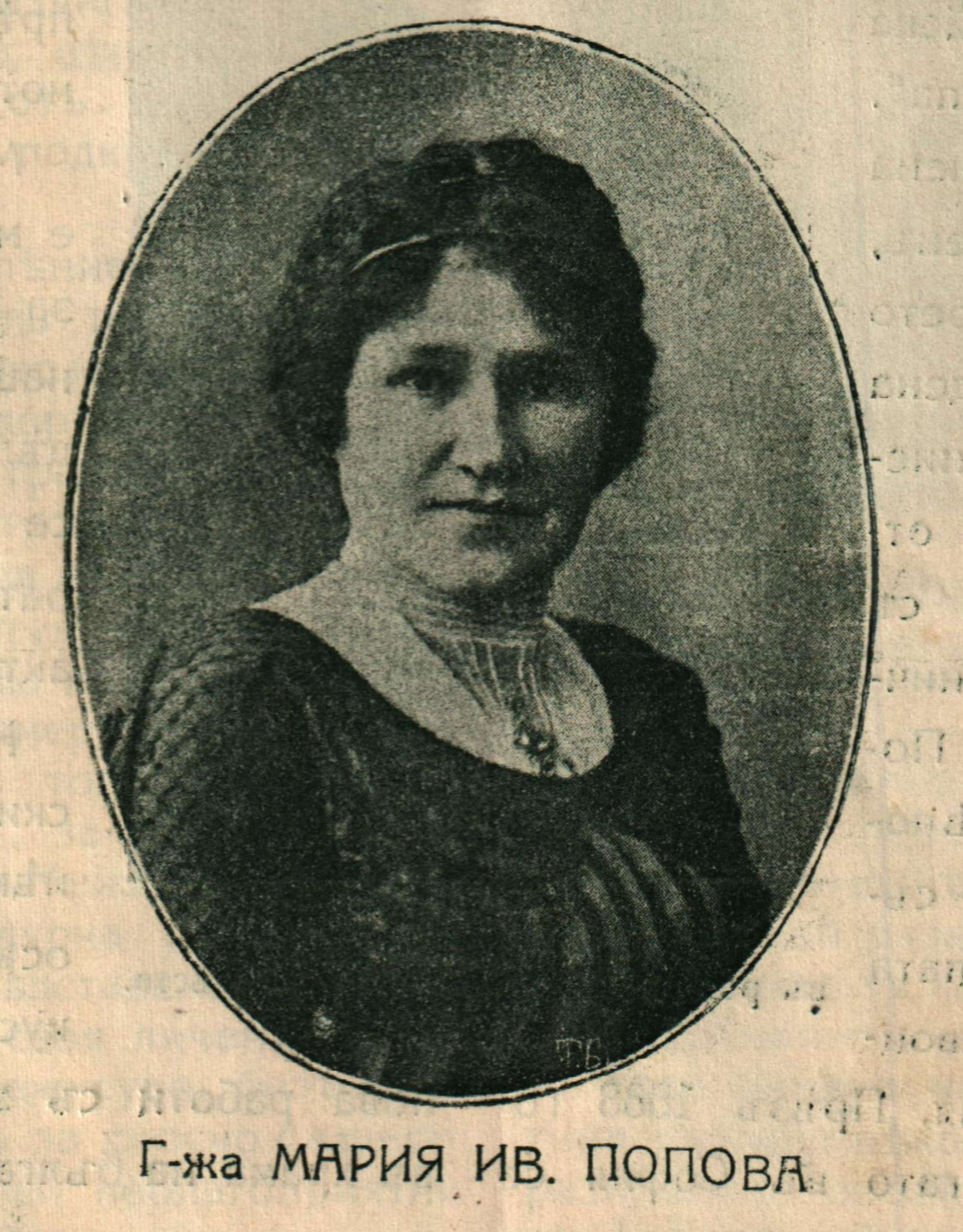
- A portrait photo of Mariyka Popova, published in 1918
- Born: 1866
- Died: 23 December 1940 (aged 74); Sofia, Bulgaria
- Known for: The first professional female actor in Bulgaria

Mariyka Ivanova Popova (1866–1940) was a Bulgarian actor. She is often referred to as the first professional actress in Bulgaria.

== Biography ==
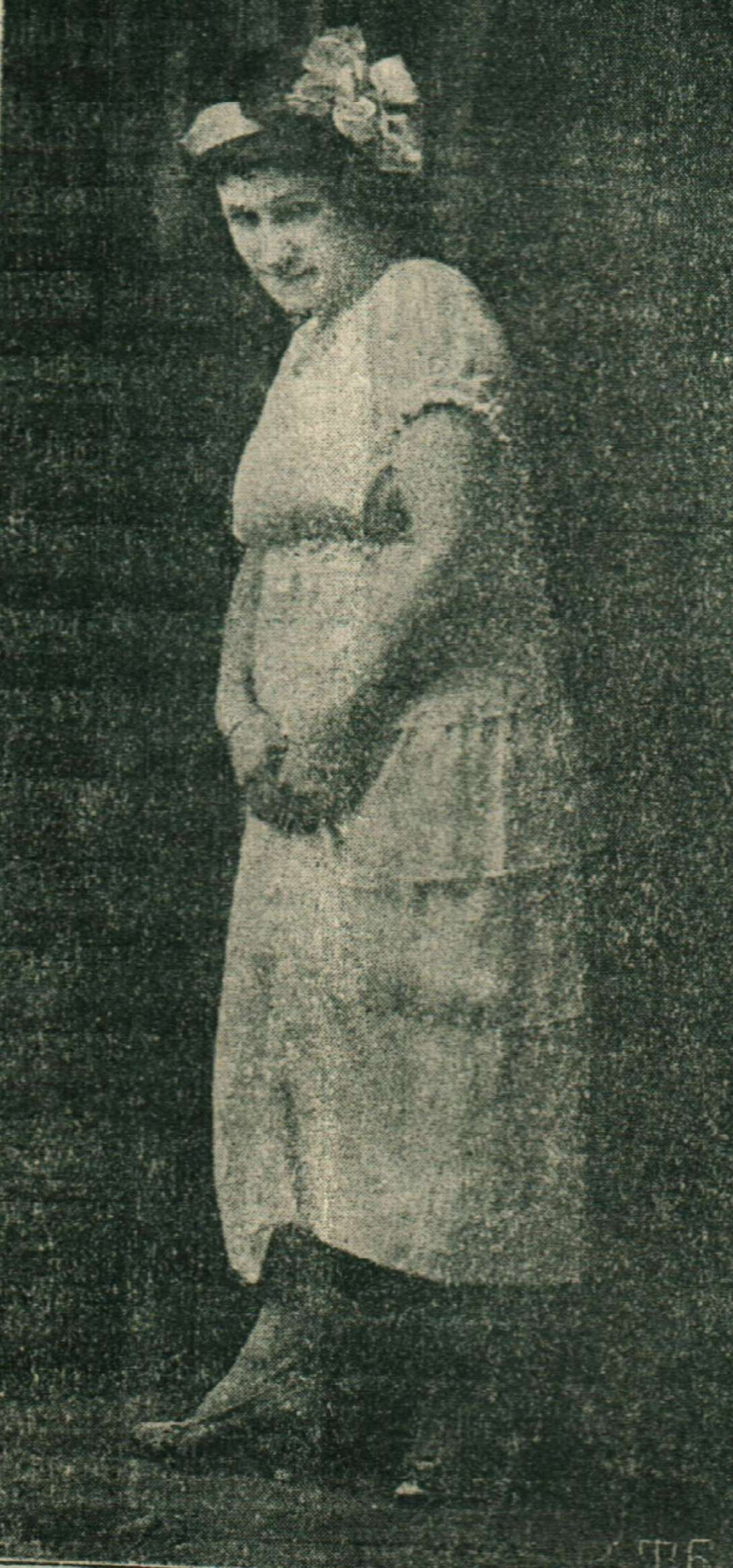
In the role of Polina in „Dohodno Myasto" published 1918 Source: ДА „Архиви“

Mariyka Popova was born in Ruse, Bulgaria in 1866, and finished her elementary education in Ruse. Afterwards, she relocated to Plovdiv with her parents and studied at the Plovdiv Girls' High School. After the Rumelia theatrical troupe was founded in 1883, she was also invited to join as a member.

Popova made her debut in "Robstvoto na mazhete". She then broke away from her education and entirely dedicated herself to the theater. After the Bulgarian unification in 1885, the troupe re-established its activity. In 1888, she joined the theatre "Osnova" and later became a member of the Drama department of the Sofia troupe in the theatre "Salza i Smyah". She also performed in the National Theatre Ivan Vazov after its founding.

Mariyka Popova died in Sofia on 23 December 1940.

== Major Theater Roles ==
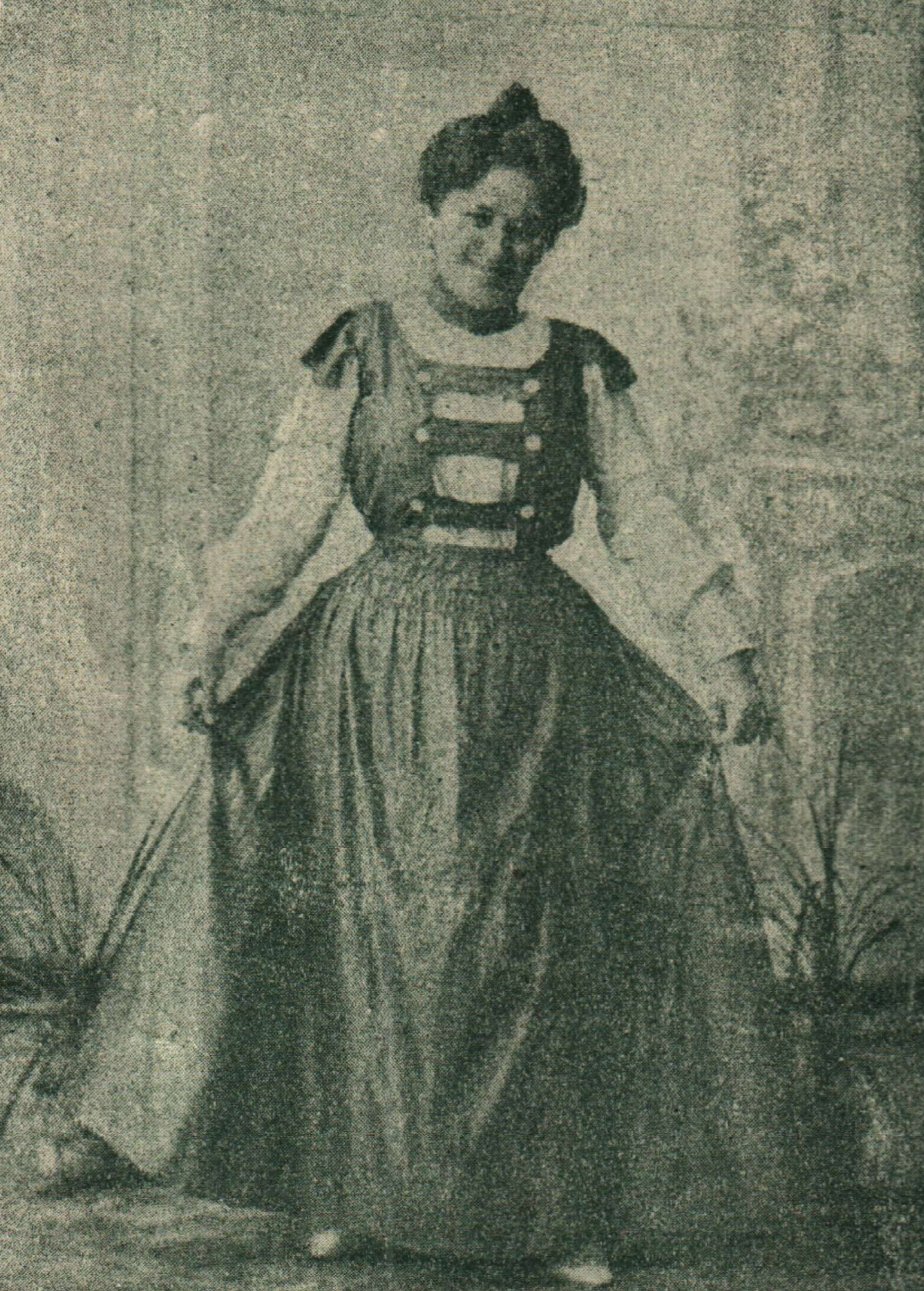
From the theatrical play „Dobrite Priyateli" Published in 1918. Източник: ДА „Архиви"

The most significant among many roles in Mariyka Popova's career are:

- Klotilda "Kamenodeletsa" of Alexandre Dumas
- Marya Anonovna "Revizor" of Nikolai Gogol
- Agafya Tihovna – "Zhenitba" of Nikolai Gogol
- Ruska – "Ruska" – of Ivan Vazov
- Evgeni – "Hashove" of Ivan Vazov
- Ms. Terziyska – "Sluzhbogontsi" of Ivan Vazov
