= The Outcasts (play) =

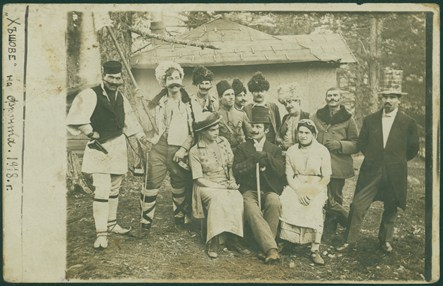
Postcard - photo of a theatre crew that performed the play "The Outcasts" in front of soldiers in 1918. Source: Bulgarian Archives State Agency.

The Outcasts (Bulgarian: Хъшове) is a Bulgarian play, authored by Ivan Vazov in 1884. It describes the life of Bulgarian emigrants in Wallachia, who, destitute, seek the means to fight for the liberation of Bulgaria from Ottoman rule. It is an adaptation for the stage of Vazov's novel Chased and Unwanted and is considered a classic of Bulgarian literature. When the National Theatre of Bulgaria, Ivan Vazov National Theatre, opened in 1904, it was the first play to be performed there, starring Geno Kirov and Ivan Popov. In 2009, Vazov's play was filmed in the series "Outcasts".
