= Southern Rep =

Southern Rep (Southern Rep Theatre) is a regional theatre located in New Orleans, Louisiana. It is a member of National New Plays Network and Theatre Communications Group.

Founded in 1986 by Dr. Rosary O'Neill, it is now led by Producing Artistic Director Aimee Hayes. Southern Rep has been the recipient of the Governor's Arts Organization Award from Lt. Gov. Mitch Landrieu and the State Department of Culture, Recreation and Tourism.

== History ==
After its founding in 1986 by playwright and scholar Dr. Rosary O'Neill, Southern Rep focused on producing work that reflects Southern heritage. From 2002 through 2007, under the leadership of Producing Artistic Director Ryan Rilette, Southern Rep began focusing on developing new plays by American playwrights, featuring regional premieres of national work, and joining the National New Play Network. Marieke Gaboury joined as Managing Director in 2010 and left in 2012.Aimee Hayes was appointed Artistic Director in 2008. Aimee Hayes left in 2020. Sacha Grandoit is The Current Interim Artistic Director, as August 2021 of

In 2019, the theater took up permanent residence in the former St. Rose of Lima Catholic Church. It closed in 2022.

== Former locations ==
The company's primary location was at One Canal Place. The theater has also performed at Mid-City Theater, Loyola University's Marquette Hall, Michalopoulos Gallery, Ursuline Academy auditorium theater, Ashé Power House theater and The Contemporary Arts Center, NewOrleans.

== Katrina ==
In 2005, Southern Rep had to temporarily close its doors during Hurricane Katrina and ensuing aftermath. It reopened to the public in the months after Hurricane Katrina.

== Production history ==
- Southern Rep Theatre Productions
