= National New Play Network =

The National New Play Network (NNPN) is the United States' "alliance of nonprofit theaters that champions the development, production, and continued life of new plays". It was founded in 1998 by David Goldman.

== Programs ==
=== Rolling World Premieres ===
NNPN's flagship program, the Rolling World Premiere, is a unique model for developing and producing new plays across the country. Each RWP supports three or more theaters that choose to mount the same new play within a 12-month period, allowing the playwright to develop a new work with multiple creative teams in multiple communities. The playwright is part of the process, working on the script and making adjustments based on what is learned from each production and from each city. To-date, NNPN has produced over 85 Rolling World Premieres, totaling over 275 productions.

=== New Play Exchange ===
The New Play Exchange is the world's largest database of plays by living writers. Launched in 2015, the database has grown to include more than 24,000 scripts by more than 6,00 authors.

=== Producers-in-Residence ===
In 2011, NNPN established its Producers in Residence program to support season-long residencies at NNPN Core Member theaters for individuals who wish dedicate their careers (or the next phase of their careers) to the creation and production of new work. Selected producers are given a home within a professional theater in which they can supplement their skills, increase their knowledge of the day-to-day operations of a company focused on new work, and be introduced as theater-makers to a community.

=== National Showcase of New Plays ===
Established in 2002, The National Showcase of New Plays is an annual 3-day event that showcases unproduced plays from across the country. Artistic leaders, literary managers, and other staff from Member Theaters, as well as literary agents, publishers, and independent producers, are invited to attend.

=== Commissions ===
NNPN annually gives two major commissions.

The Annual Commission is a $10,000 award given to at least one proposal each year. Core Members nominate proposals for consideration, and the winning Member Theater is responsible for the administration and development of the commissioned play.

The NNPN Smith Prize for American Theatre is a $5,000 award nominated by a Member Theater and given to an early-career playwright who has been a participant in other NNPN programs to write a play examining the American body politic. The Member Theater that submits the nomination earns up to $2,500 for a developmental workshop of the play. Additionally, the first theater to fully produce the commissioned play is awarded an additional $2,500.

== Member theatres ==
Core Members	Associate Members
16th Street Theater	59E59 Theaters
Actor's Express	A Contemporary Theatre
Actor's Theatre of Charlotte	Amphibian Stage Productions
B Street Theatre	Artists Repertory Theatre
City Theatre Company	Azuka Theatre
Cleveland Public Theatre	Baltimore Center Stage
Company One Theatre	Bloomington Playwrights Project
Contemporary American Theater Festival	BLUEBARN Theatre
Curious Theatre Company	Boston Court Pasadena
Florida Studio Theatre	Boulder Ensemble Theatre Company
Fountain Theatre	Capital Stage Company
Horizon Theatre Company	Centenary Stage Company
InterAct Theatre Company	CenterStage at the JCC
Kitchen Dog Theater	Central Works Theater Company
Magic Theatre	Children's Theatre Company
Marin Theatre Company	City Theatre
Milagro	Creede Repertory Theatre
Mixed Blood Theater	Cumberland County Playhouse
New Jersey Repertory Company	DCPA Theatre Company
New Repertory Theatre	Diversionary Theatre
Orlando Shakespeare Theater	Everyman Theatre
Perseverance Theatre	Florida Repertory Theatre
Phoenix Theatre	Flying V Theatre
PROP Thtr	Geva Theatre Center
Riverside Theatre	Greenway Court Theatre
Salt Lake Acting Company	Gulfshore Playhouse
San Diego REPertory Theatre	Halcyon Theatre
Silk Road Rising	History Theatre
Southern Rep Theatre	IAMA Theatre Company
Unicorn Theatre	Island City Stage
Woolly Mammoth Theatre Company	Know Theatre of Cincinnati
Writers Theatre of New Jersey	LOCAL Theater Company
	Lower Depth Theatre Ensemble
	Milwaukee Repertory Theater
	Minnesota Jewish Theater Company
	Montana Repertory Theatre
	Moving Arts
	Moxie Theatre
	Native Voices at the Autry
	New Conservatory Theatre Center
	New Light Theater Project
	NewYorkRep
	Olney Theatre Center
	Oregon Contemporary Theatre
	Out of Hand Theater
	Pacific Resident Theatre
	Palm Beach Dramaworks
	People's Light
	Phoenix Arts Association Theatre
	Plan-B Theatre Company
	PlayGround
	PlayMakers Repertory Company
	Portland Center Stage
	PYGmalion Theatre Company
	Redtwist Theatre
	Renaissance Theaterworks
	Rep Stage
	Rivendell Theater Ensemble
	Road Less Traveled Productions
	Rogue Machine Theatre
	Rorschach Theatre
	Round House Theatre
	San Francisco Playhouse
	Shadowland Stages
	Shrewd Productions
	Simpatico Theatre
	Skylight Theatre Company
	South Coast Repertory
	Stageworks
	Su Teatro
	Taproot Theatre Company
	Teatro Vista
	The Custom Made Theatre Company
	The NOLA Project
	The Wilbury Theatre Group
	Theater Alliance
	Theater J
	Theatre 3
	Theatre Exile
	Theatre NOVA
	Thrown Stone Theatre Company
	Trinity Rep
	Vermont Stage Company
	Virginia Repertory Theatre
	Vortex Repertory Company
	Weston Playhouse Theatre Company
	Williamston Theatre
	Zoetic Stage
