= William J. G. Turner =

American dramatist

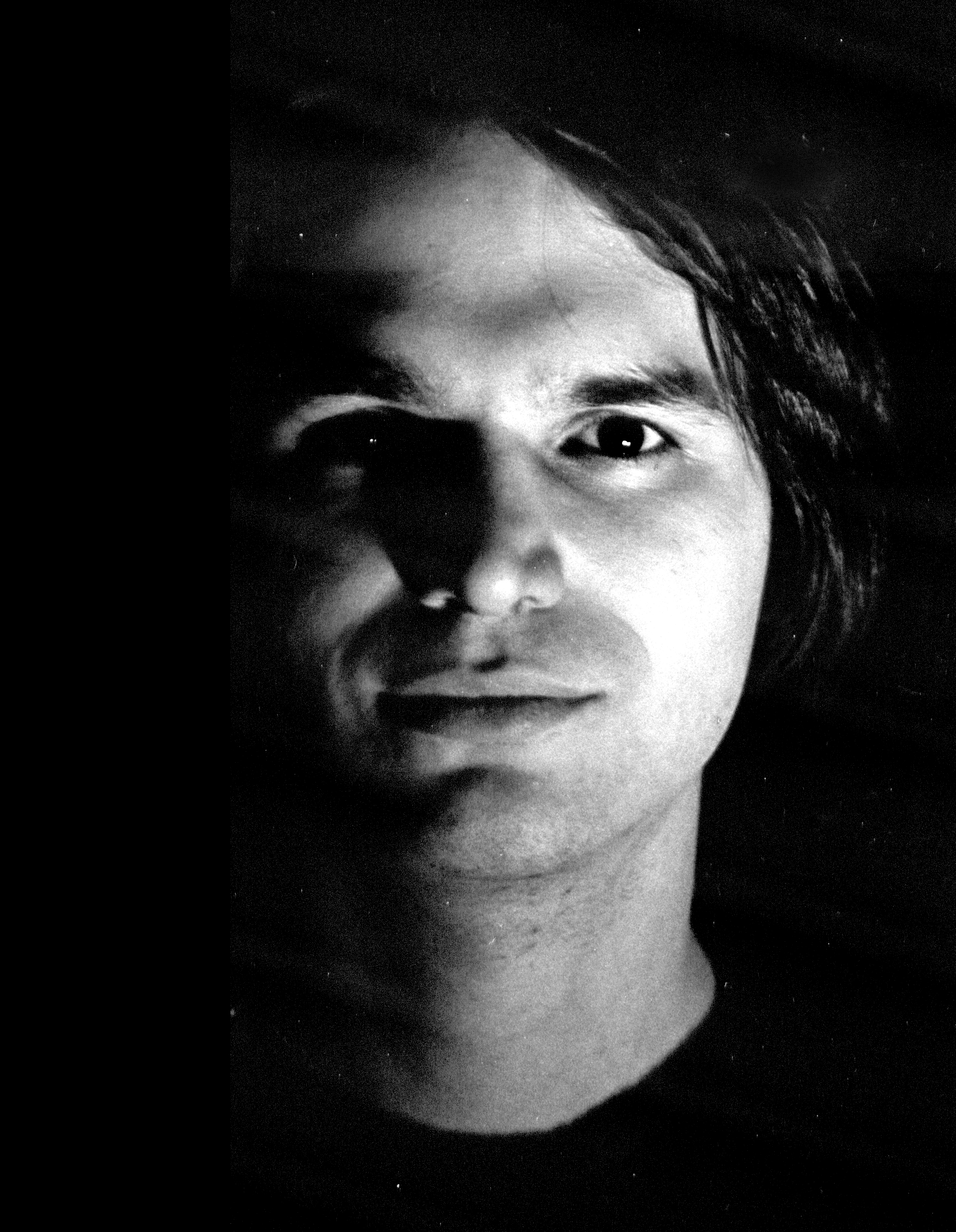
William John Gascoyne ("Bill") Turner

William John Gascoyne Turner (October 20, 1952 – June 26, 1987) was a composer, director, dramatist, producer and actor.

He died of AIDS at the age of 34.

Turner's musical manuscripts are archived in the Music Collection of the New York Public Library.
