= Mixed Blood Theatre Company =

Theater company in Minneapolis, Minnesota, US

Coordinates: 44°58′15.35″N 93°14′57.75″W

Mixed Blood Theatre
- Interactive map of Mixed Blood Theatre
- Address: 1501 South Fourth St. Minneapolis, MN 55454; United States
- Capacity: 200

Construction
- Opened: 1976

Website
- mixedblood.com

The Mixed Blood Theatre Company is a professional multiracial theatre company in Minneapolis, Minnesota. It was founded in 1976 by artistic director Jack Reuler, to explore race via the use of theater.

== History ==
Jack Reuler founded Mixed Blood in 1976 to explore issues around race within the theater framework. Mixed Blood operates out of an old Cedar-Riverside firehouse.

In the 1990s Jack Reuler worked with Syl Jones, playwright who had formerly worked in the corporate setting, to create customized plays and workshops for corporate and governmental clients ranging from Medtronic and Honeywell to the William Mitchell College of Law and the Ramsey County Attorney's Office. Syl Jones would write the play or workshop, merging his corporate experience with his playwriting skills. Jones formerly won accolades for his new works at Mixed Blood (Cincinnati Man) and Penumbra (Shine), both in 1992.2

Mixed Blood Theatre was the first company to use the Joe Dowling Studio in the Guthrie Theater with its play Yellowman in 2006.

In 2021 Jack Reuler's retirement was announced and in 2022 Mark Valdez was announced as the new Artistic Director.

== Works ==
Mixed Blood's plays range from chamber theatre to political satires. The theatre presents over 500 performances annually in the Alan Page Auditorium of its historic firehouse theatre, as well as in schools, churches, community centers, juvenile detention centers, and workplaces. Mixed Blood seeks to "addresses injustices, inequities, and cultural collisions, providing a voice for the unheard—on stage, in the workplace, in the company’s own Cedar Riverside neighborhood and beyond."

Mixed Blood is a member of Theatre Communications Group (TCG) and the National New Play Network (NNPN).
