= Alexander Morfov =

Bulgarian theater and cinema director (born 1960)

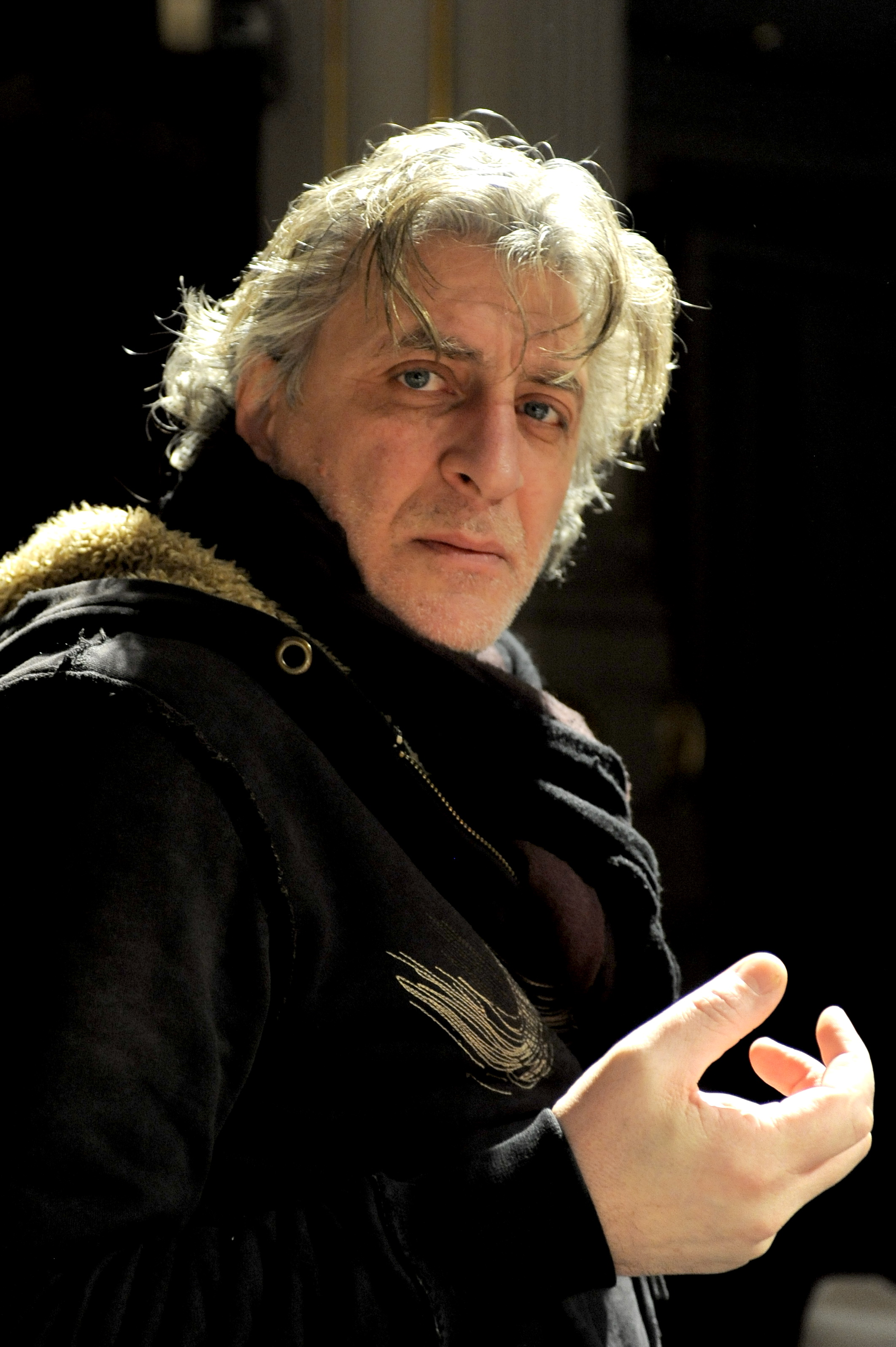
- Alexander Morfov, theatre director
- Born: Александър Морфов; 9 November 1960 (age 65); Yambol, Bulgaria
- Occupations: Theatre and cinema director
- Years active: 1990–present
- Spouse(s): Reni Vrangova, actress

Alexander Morfov (Bulgarian: Александър Морфов; born 9 November 1960) is a Bulgarian theater and cinema director.

== Biography ==
Alexander Morfov was born on 9 November 1960 in Yambol. His father was an officer, and his mother was a teacher in Russian language and literature, music, and also a conductor of a folklore choir in Sliven. After Morfov graduated from mathematical high school, he attended lectures for two years at the Technical University of Varna.

Morfov's theater career began while he was a student, when he participated as an assistant stage director in Stoyan Alexiev's theater company. After quitting university he began working in the theater in Sliven as a stage worker and later light manager. In 1984 he was enrolled in the National Academy for Theatre and Film Arts (NATFA) in Sofia. He graduated from the Academy with a double major in stage directing for drama and puppet theater (1990) in the class of Julia Ognyanova and cinema directing (1994) in the class of Georgi Djulgerov.

== Early work ==
His earliest works on a professional stage were in the Rhodope drama theater, where he was the author and director of the satire Political cabaret (1990). Immediately after his sophomore production he was invited to work at the Little City Theatre "Off the Channel" where he staged Pere Ubu by Alfred Jarry (1991), followed by The Tempest (1992) and Hamlet by Shakespeare in the La Strada Theater.

== Professional career in Bulgaria ==
From 1994 to 2000, Morfov has been the Chief director at the Ivan Vazov National Theatre of Bulgaria. Morfov's first shows at the National Theatre were his original version of Don Quixote by Miguel de Cervantes and a revised version of The Tempest. These two productions launched a new process of attracting young and modern-thinking audiences to the theater. With his next production of Shakespeare's A Midsummer Night's Dream, Morfov became one of the most prominent theater directors in Bulgaria. His original version of The Decameron, or Passion and Blood after Boccaccio, also bears the traits of his stylistics. The Lower Depths by Maxim Gorky reflected Morfov's civil opinion and his typical theatricality. Exiles (2004) after a novel by Ivan Vazov, the national poet and writer, is the logical continuation of the latter. His other productions on the leading stage in the country include: Night of Miracles after Beckett, Mrozek and Ionesco; Dom Juan by Molière; One Flew over the Cuckoo’s Nest; and Life Is Beautiful after Nikolai Erdman's The Suicide.

In 2000 he was appointed managing and artistic director of the Ivan Vazov National Theater. He was dismissed from this position following a major conflict with the Bulgarian Ministry of Culture. All of his productions were taken off the theater's repertory.

== International success ==
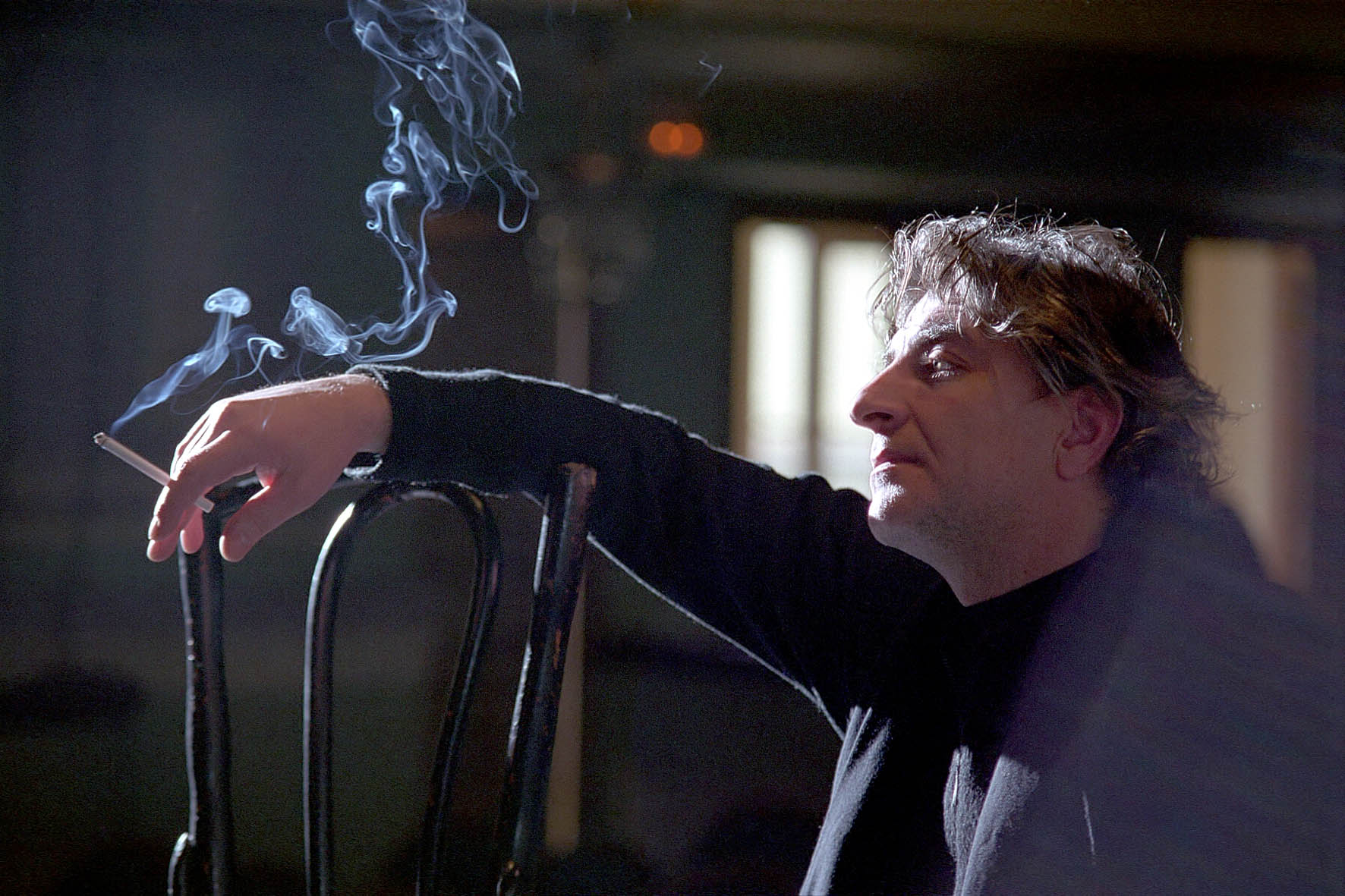

Since 2001 he has been working in Russia. His first show, The Tempest, in the Komissarzhevskaya Theatre in St. Petersburg, was honoured with Russia's most prestigious theatre award, the Golden Mask. Immediately after that he was invited to Moscow, to the theatre of the Russian actor Alexander Kalyagin, Et cetera, where he staged Don Quixote and Pere Ubu with Kalyagin in the leading role. Both productions were nominated for the Golden Mask Award and Kalyagin received the award for Best Performance for the role of Pere Ubu. Between 2003 and 2006 Morfov was appointed chief stage director in the Komissarzhevskaya Theatre, where he staged five productions and received the Golden Soffit Award for Dom Juan by Moliere and was again nominated for the Golden Mask Award. He also staged productions of One Flew over the Cuckoo’s Nest with Aleksandr Abdulov and The Visit of the Old Lady with Maria Mironova in Lenkom Theatre. Morfov has received more than twenty national and international theatre awards, including the Golden Mask Award, Chaika [seagull], Crystal Turandot, and others.

In 2005 he worked in the United States with Mikhail Baryshnikov on the theatre project Doctor and Patient by Rezo Gabriadze.

In 2006 he returned to the National Theatre of Bulgaria as a chief stage director – a position he has held since. Morfov's shows were presented at international theatre festivals in Vienna, Casablanca, Kyiv, Toruń, Ohrid, Belgrade, Wrocław, and Hamburg. He has also worked on projects in France, Sweden, North Macedonia, Romania, Latvia, and Israel. He is currently working at the Ion Luca Caragiale National Theatre, Bucharest, Romania, staging The Tempest by William Shakespeare.

Morfov is also a cinema director and scriptwriter. He has had acting roles in Ivan and Alexandra, Friends of Emily, The Last Sunday, The Goat Horn, The Love Summer of a Schlep, Travel to Jerusalem and others.

== Personal life ==
Morfov is married to actress Reni Vrangova, with whom he has two daughters.

== TV and cinema ==
=== TV films ===
- 1994–2000 Cinema Kings, scriptwriter and director (Bulgarian National Television (BNT))
- 1997 Nights of Miracles, scriptwriter and director (BNT)
- 2009 Exiles, TV series, scriptwriter and director (BNT)

=== Cinema ===
- 2001 Blueberry Hill, Cia Advertising and BNT

== Honorary awards and prizes ==
From the Society of theatre critics in Bulgaria:

- 1994 Best stage director and Best production for Don Quixote
- 1995 Best stage director and Best production for Midsummernight’s Dream
- 2004 Best production for Exiles
- 2007 Best production for Dom Juan

From Ohrid theatre festival:

- 1992 First prize for the production The Tempest

Askeer theatre award in Bulgaria:

- 1994 Best stage director and Best production for Don Quixote
- 1997 Best stage director and Best production for The Lower Depths
- 2004 Best stage director and Best production for Exiles
- 2007 Best stage director and Best production for Dom Juan

Icarus theatre award given by the Bulgarian Actors' Union:

- 1997 Best stage director and Best production for The Lower Depths
- 2004 Best stage director and Best production for Exiles
- 2007 Best stage director and Best production for Dom Juan

“The Golden Muse” Russian award:

- 2000 Special prize for the production The Lower Depths

“The Golden Soffit” award in St. Petersburg:

- 2004 Best stage director and Best production for Dom Juan

Chaika ("seagull") Russian award:

- 2006 Best production for One Flew over the Cuckoo’s Nest, Lenkom Theatre, Moscow

Crystal Turandot Russian award:

- 2006 Best production for One Flew over the Cuckoo’s Nest, Lenkom Theatre Moscow

National Festival for TV and Cinema, Plovdiv, Bulgaria:

- 2001 Best director for the cinema production Blueberry Hill
- 2009 Special prize of the jury for the cinema production Exiles

Bulgarian cinema award:

- 2002 Best directing debut for the production Blueberry Hill

Bulgarian Cinema Academy

- 2009 Best cinema production Exiles, and many others

Nominations: The Golden Mask Russian award:

- 2000 Best stage director for the production The Tempest, Komissarzhevskaya Theatre, St. Petersburg
- 2002 Best production for Pere Ubu, Et Cetera Theatre, Moscow
- 2004 Best stage director of the best production Dom Juan, Komissarzhevskaya Theatre, St. Petersburg
- 2006 Best stage director of the best production One Flew over the Cuckoo's Nest, Lenkom Theatre, Moscow
- 2007 Audience prize for One Flew over the Cuckoo’s Nest, Lenkom Theatre, Moscow

Theatre awards in Romania:

- 2012 Best production, The Visit of the Old Lady, National Theater of Romania, Bucharest

He has also received the Bulgarian award of the Order of Saints Cyril and Methodius, first rank, "for special merit in the field of culture and arts in Bulgaria". Morfov is doctor honoris causa of the University of Audiovisual Arts ESRA, in Paris, Skopje, and New York.
