= Eric Coble =

American playwright and screenwriter

- Born: Edinburgh, Scotland
- Occupations: Playwright, screenwriter
- Notable work: The Velocity of Autumn (2011); Bright Ideas
- Website: https://ericcoble.com

Eric Coble is an American playwright and screenwriter. He is a member of the Playwrights' Unit of the Cleveland Play House.

Eric Coble was born in Edinburgh, Scotland and raised on the Navajo and Ute reservations in New Mexico and Colorado. Before turning to playwriting, he received his BA in English from Fort Lewis College in Durango, Colorado, and his MFA in acting from Ohio University.

== Career ==
Coble's play, The Velocity of Autumn premiered on Broadway on April 1, 2014 (previews), officially on April 21, 2014, at the Booth Theatre, starring Estelle Parsons and Stephen Spinella, directed by Molly Smith. Estelle Parsons received a Tony Award nomination for Best Actress in a Play. The play had its debut at the Boise Contemporary Theatre before moving to Arena Stage, Washington, D.C., in 2013.

The Spanish version, La velocidad del otoño, premiered at the Teatro Bellas Artes in Madrid in December 2016. It starred Lola Herrera and Juanjo Artero and was directed by Magüi Mira.

His play Bright Ideas opened Off-Broadway at the Manhattan Class Company, directed by John Rando, and has since been published by Dramatists Play Service, with dozens of productions across the U.S. His stage adaptation of Lois Lowry's The Giver (published by Dramatic Publishing) has had over 300 productions on three continents. Other work includes Natural Selection (published by Playscripts), For Better (published by Samuel French), The Dead Guy (published by DPS), Virtual Devotion, Cinderella Confidential, and Pecos Bill and the Ghost Stampede (all published by Dramatic Publishing).

His plays have been produced in 50 states of the U.S., and on six continents including productions at The Kennedy Center, Manhattan Class Company, Actors Studio, Playwrights Horizons, The Denver Center Theatre Company, Arena Stage, The Edinburgh and New York Fringe Festivals, South Coast Repertory, Laguna Playhouse, Alliance Theatre, Cleveland Play House, Actors Theatre of Louisville, Cleveland Public Thaeatre, Indiana Repertory, Coterie Theatre, Asolo Rep, Curious Theatre, Geva Theatre, Alabama Shakespeare Festival, Dobama Theatre, Stages Repertory, Great Lakes Theater, Coterie Theatre, Boise Contemporary Theatre, Habima Theatre (Israel), Pentacion Productions (Spain), Teatr Polski (Poland), Orange Row (Mexico)and the Contemporary American Theatre Festival.

Awards include an Emmy nomination, the Steinberg New Play Award, two American Alliance for Theatre and Education Distinguished Play Awards for Best Adaptation, the AATE Award for Distinguished Play (2022), the AT&T Onstage Award, National Theatre Conference Playwriting Award, an NEA Playwright in Residence Grant, two TCG Extended Collaboration Grants, Aristophanes Award for Best Off-Broadway Comedy, First Place in the Southwest Festival of New Plays, Heideman Finalist for Actors Theatre Louisville, three Best of the CATCO Shorts Festival Awards, the Cleveland Arts Prize, two Cuyahoga Arts and Culture Creative Workforce Fellowships, and four Ohio Arts Individual Excellence Awards.

== Selected works ==
Selected Works
YEAR	TITLE	PREMIERE	PUBLICATION
1993	Ordering Lunch	Playwrights Horizons Summerfest, NY	
1994	Isolated Incidents	Cleveland Public Theatre, OH	
1994	Tristan And Isolde	Aegean Theatre Co., NY	
1996	Sound-Biting	Dobama Theatre, OH	
1996	In A Grove: Four Japanese Ghost Stories	Cleveland Play House, OH	Published by Playscripts
1997	Nightfall With Edgar Allan Poe	Cleveland Play House, OH	Published by Playscripts
1998	The Emperor's New Clothes	Cleveland Play House, OH	Published by Dramatic Publishing
1998	Virtual Devotion	Dobama Theatre, OH	Published by Dramatic Publishing
1998	Myth-Adventures: Five Greek Classics	Cleveland Play House, OH	published by Dramatic Publishing
1998	Under The Flesh: The Final Descent of Edgar Allan Poe	Cleveland Playhouse, OH	
1999	truth: The Testimonial Of Sojourner Truth	Dobama Theatre, OH	published by Playscripts
1999	The Servant Of Two Masters	Cleveland Playhouse, OH	
1999	Gold In The Bones: Three Tales Of Haunted New England	Cleveland Play House, OH	published by Playscripts
1999	Pinocchio 3.5	Cleveland Play House, OH	published by Playscripts
2000	The Way You Look Tonight	Great Lakes Theater Festival, OH	
2000	Lake Of Panthers	Cleveland Play House, OH	
2000	Tales Of The Southern Frontier	Eckard Theatre Company, FL	
2001	Bright Ideas	Cleveland Play House, OH	published by Dramatists Play Service
2001	Strange Intelligence	Imagination Stage, Washington DC	
2001	Pecos Bill And The Ghost Stampede	Cleveland Play House, OH	published by Dramatic Publishing
2001	Straight On 'Til Morning	Great Lakes Theater Festival, OH	
2002	Baggage Unattended	Contemporary American Theatre Company, OH	
2002	From Here: A Century Of Voices From Ohio	Wallpaper Project Ohio state-wide tour	
2002	T.I.D.Y.	Beck Center For The Arts, OH	
2003	Sacagawea	Oregon Children's Theatre, OR	published by Playscripts
2003	Cinderella Confidential	Cleveland Play House, OH	published by Dramatic Publishing
2004	Remote	Contemporary American Theatre Company, OH	
2004	The Machine Stops (by E.M. Forster)	Hiram College, OH	
2004	Vote?	Eckard Theatre Company, FL	published by Dramatic Publishing
2005	Uncle Sam's Satiric Spectacular	Humana Festival, Actors Theatre of Louisville, KY	published by Playscripts
2005	Ten Minutes From Cleveland	Dobama Theatre, OH	
2005	The Dead Guy	Curious Theatre, CO	published by Dramatists Play Service
2005	The Giver (based on the novel by Lois Lowry)	Oregon Children's Theatre, OR	published by Dramatic Publishing
2006	Natural Selection	Humana Festival, Actors Theatre of Louisville, KY	published by Playscripts
2006	Waiting For The Matinee	Cleveland Play House, OH	published by Dramatists Play Service
2006	For Better	National New Play Network rolling world-premier: Curious Theatre, CO; New Theatre, FL; Southern Rep Theatre, LA	published by Samuel French
2006	Luis (based on the story by Richard Selzer)	Verb Ballets, OH	
2006	Haunted	Contemporary American Theatre Company, OH	
2006	Let Freedom Ring	Ensemble Theatre, OH	
2007	Zap!	Florida Repertory Theatre, FL	
2007	Terror In The Tower (comic book)		published by Akron Public Schools
2008	The Cleveland Plays, Part 1: Migration (co-written with Eric Scmhiedl and Nina Domingue)	Dobama Theatre, OH	
2008	Ask Gilby (television)	Akron Public Schools syndication	
2009	Southern Rapture	Actors Theatre of Charlotte, NC	
2009	Unbeatable (music and lyrics by Todd Schroeder and Kevin Fisher)	Phoenix Theatre, AZ	
2009	H.R.	Dobama Theatre, OH	published by Random House
2009	Ten More Minutes From Cleveland	Dobama Theatre, OH	
2009	Huck Finn (based on the novel by Mark Twain)	Cleveland Play House, OH	published by Dramatists Play Service
2010	Panto Pinocchio	Stages Repertory Theatre, TX	
2010	The White Coat, The Body, and others	Cleveland Clinic, OH	
2011	A Girl's Guide To Coffee	Actors' Summit, OH	
2011	My Barking Dog	Cleveland Public Theatre, OH	published by Dramatists Play Service
2011	The Velocity Of Autumn	Boise Contemporary Theater, ID	published by Dramatists Play Service
2011	Side Effects May Include... (co-written with Marc Jaffe	Cleveland Public Theatre, OH	
2011	Downhill		published by Dramatic Publishing
2012	The Storm In The Barn (based on the graphic novel by Matt Phelan)	Oregon Children's Theatre, OR	published by Dramatic Publishing
2012	Stranded On Earth	Boise Contemporary Theater, ID	
2012	Gathering Blue (based on the book by Lois Lowry	Oregon Children's Theatre, OR	published by Dramatic Publishing
2012	Alma mater	Ohio University, OH	
2012	A Carol For Cleveland (based on the story by Les Roberts)	Cleveland Play House, OH	
2013	Men Are From Mars, Women Are From Venus (based on the book by John Gray)	U.S. Tour	
2013	The Reason Why	Geva Theatre, NY	
2014	Sherlock Holmes: The Baker Street Irregulars (based on the graphic novels by Tony Lee and Dan Boultwood)	First Stage, WI	published by Dramatic Publishing
2014	Fairfield	Cleveland Play House, OH	
2015	Jedi Training: Challenge Of The Temple	Disney Theme Parks	
2015	Flour and Brimstone	Cleveland Public Theatre, OH	
2015	CPH RAW	Cleveland Play House, OH	
2015	Just Do It	The Every 28 Hours Plays, Ferguson, MO	published in "A Race Anthology: Dispatches and Artifacts From A Segregated City
2016	Margin of Error (or, The Unassailable Wisdom Of The Mouse And The Scorpion)	Boise Contemporary Theater, ID	
2016	These Mortal Hosts	Cleveland Play House, OH	
2016	'Twas The Night Before Christmas (In Cleveland)	Cleveland Public Theatre, OH	
2017	Swagger	Palm Beach Dramaworks, FL	published by Dramatic Publishing
2017	The Talk (co-written with Darius Stubbs)	Cleveland Public Theatre/Station Hope, OH	
2017	Ghosts In The Machine	First Stage, WI	published by Dramatic Publishing
2017	The Family Claxon	Cleveland Public Theatre, OH	
2018	The Girl Who Swallowed A Cactus	Rolling world premiere: Childsplay Theatre, AZ; Metro Theatre Company, MO	published by Dramatic Publishing
2018	Refugee (based on the book by Alan Gratz)	Florida Repertory Theatre, FL	
2019	Feed (based on the book by M.T. Anderson)	Cleveland Play House, OH	
2019	Live To Tell	Palm Beach Dramaworks, FL	Published by Dramatic Publishing
2019	Tovic Tomte And The Trolls	Talespinner Children's Theatre, OH	Published by Dramatic Publishing
2020	Wait For It	Covid One-Minute Play Festival, NY	
2021	Bulletproof Backpack	Florida Repertory Theatre, FL	published by Dramatic Publishing
2021	That Which Can Be Held	Cleveland Museum Of Art, OH	
2021	Big Changes (co-written with Kira Hopgood)		Published by Dramatic Publishing
2022	The Hatbox	Williamston Theatre, MI	
2022	The Naming Of Things	Orlando Family Stage/University Of Central Florida	Published by YouthPlays
2024	Hungry Ghosts	Palm Beach Dramaworks, FL	Published by Dramatic Publishing
2024	The Very Angsty Dinosaur	Curious Theatre Company, CO	
2025	The First Snow Of Summer	Seat Of The Pants Productions, OH	
2025	Nature's Greatest Story	Natural History Museum Abu Dhabi Grand Opening	
2025	World Class Care	Beck Center For The Arts, OH	
2026	A Dark Wood	Tin Drum Theatre Company, IL	
