= Garrigan =

Garrigan may refer to:

- Alison Garrigan (born 1958), American singer
- Jacques Garrigan (1725–?), French bookseller
- Jim Garrigan (1905–1971), Australian politician
- Liam Garrigan (born 1981), English actor
- Mike Garrigan, lead singer of the American band Collapsis
- Philip Joseph Garrigan (1840–1919), American Roman Catholic bishop
- Steve Garrigan, lead singer of the Irish band Kodaline
- Anthony Garrigan, (born 1965), Software Developer

Fictional characters

- Nicholas Garrigan, character in The Last King of Scotland
