= Talespinner Children's Theatre =

American children's theater in Cleveland, Ohio

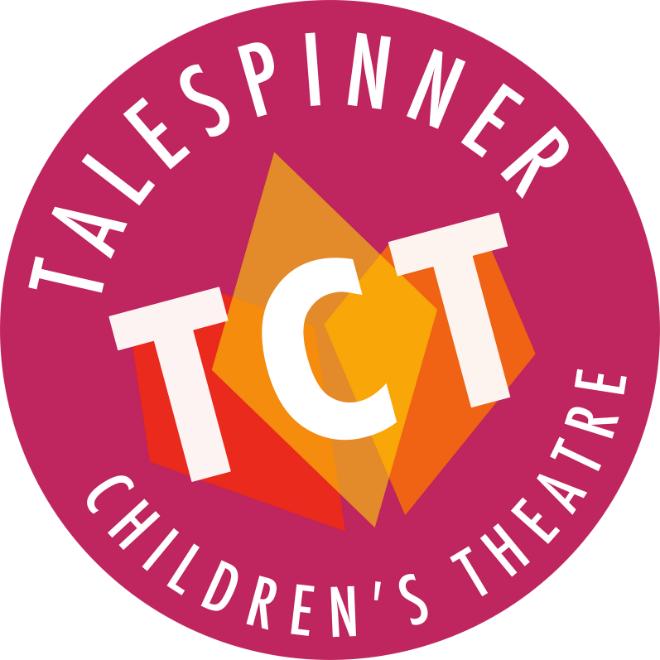
- Formation: 2012
- Type: Theatre group
- Location(s): 1305 West 80th St. Cleveland, OH 44102
- Artistic director: Heather Utsler-Smith
- Website: https://talespinnercle.org

Talespinner Children's Theatre (TCT) is a professional theater for child audiences based in Cleveland, Ohio. Its inaugural season began early 2012 in the Gordon Square neighborhood in the city's Near West Side. In 2023 TCT left Reinberger Auditorium for their new home at 78th Street Studios. Adding offices and new classroom spaces.

TCT specializes in presenting imaginative original work inspired by or adapted from classic tales from world literature. Productions feature small ensembles of adult actors, utilizing puppets, dance, movement, music and song and fantastical costumes to bring each play to life for young audiences.

TCT also provides theater-arts classes for children throughout the year.

Founded by Artistic Director Alison Garrigan, TCT has a board of directors and paid staff.

== Critical response ==
During its decade of history, TCT has received strong support from Cleveland area critics. Rave and Pan blog reviewer Christine Howey has said their work is "always engaging" and CoolCleveland.com has asserted that "performances at Talespinner Children’s Theatre are always magical".

== Awards ==
Cleveland Critics Circle, Special Recognition (2013) "for producing shows for kids that adults can enjoy, using local writers as adaptors and playwrights".

== Productions ==
=== 2022 season ===
- Aponibolinayen in the Sky (a tale of the Philippines) by Elana and Les Hunter
- The Snowy Day and Other Stories by Ezra Jack Keats Adapted for the stage by Jerome Hairston, Based on the books by Ezra Jack Keats
- Hook & Smee by T. Paul Lowry
- Everything I Feel Newly Devised

=== 2018 season ===
- The Oba Asks For a Mountain (A Tale of Nigeria) by Gail Nyoka
- The Princess & The Nightingale (A Tale of Thailand) by Marian Fairman
- The Boy Who Stole the Sun (and Other Native American Stories) adapted by Alison Garrigan
- A Song in the Flame (A Tale of Israel) by Margi Herwald Zitelli
- Jan & The Trickster (A Polish Tale of Magic) by Krysia Orlowski

=== 2017 season ===
- The Brementown Musicians adapted by Claire Robinson May
- Red Onion, White Garlic (a tale of Indonesia) adapted by David Hansen
- Sundiata (a tale of Mali) adapted by Nina Domingue Glover
- The Rainbow Serpent (a tale of Aboriginal Australia) adapted by Christopher Johnston
- Mr. Scrooge's Ghosts (a Dickens of a Holiday tale) adapted by Michael Sepesy

=== 2016 season ===
- Peter and the Wolf (based on the work of Sergei Prokofiev) adapted by Greg Vovos
- Golden (a Grimm's Faerie tale) adapted by Toni K. Thayer
- The Crocodile, the Cobra, and the Girl Down the Well (a Tale of India) adapted by Anne McEvoy
- The Mummies and the Magic Prince (a Tale of Egyptian Mythology) adapted by Michael Sepesy
- Hook & Smee (a Tale of Never Never Land) adapted by T. Paul Lowry

=== 2015 season ===
- The Fisherman and the Moon (Why Moon Reflects on Water) adapted by Alison Garrigan
- Fire On The Water (Part Four of the Elements Cycle) a special presentation produced in collaboration with Cleveland Public Theatre
- Rosalynde & The Falcon (a Topsy-Turvy Tale of England) by David Hansen
- The Silent Princess (a Turkish Folktale) adapted by Claire Robinson May
- Finn McCool (a Tale of Irish Mythology) adapted by Christopher Johnston
- Prince Ivan & The Firebird (a Russian Tale of Magic) adapted by Alison Garrigan

=== 2014 season ===
- Aesop's Pirate Adventure By Michael Sepesy
- The Floating Dolls (a Polish Folktale) Adapted by Toni K. Thayer
- Loki & Lucy (a Norse Mythology Story) By Michael Geither
- Clara and the Nutcracker Adapted by Anne McEvoy

=== 2013 season ===
- The Tinderbox by Hans Christian Andersen, Adapted by Mike Geither
- The Emperor's Ears (A Serbian Folktale) Adapted by Michael Sepesy
- Adventures In Slumberland (Based on the Characters of Winsor McCay) By David Hansen

=== 2012 season ===
- The Tale of the Name of the Tree (A Bantu Tale) Adapted by Michael Sepesy
- Magic Flute Adapted by Anne McEvoy
