= Dobama's Night Kitchen =

Dobama Theatre had been presenting short plays following 8 pm "mainstage" productions for several seasons before artistic director Joyce Casey asked David Hansen to act as the producer of a series of late-night events geared specifically to audiences in their late-teens and twenties.

Called Dobama’s Night Kitchen, the title inspired by the 1970 Maurice Sendak children’s book, began in Fall, 1995.

David Hansen’s three-year tenure as artistic director of the Night Kitchen was dedicated to three models of production; the long-form improv, the collaboratively written script based around a single theme, and the new play written by a local (Cleveland-based) playwright.

Dobama's Night Kitchen was the first Cleveland area theater to present long-form improv. These included the MTV inspired The Realistic World and the X-Files inspired One Step Beyond.

In 1997 Hansen produced his own play, The Vampyres. Dobama's Night Kitchen also produced the first solo performance by Sarah Morton, The Eighth Wonder of the World.

In 1998 Dan Kilbane took over as artistic director and continued the previous trend of collaboratively written scripts, singly authored scripts by local playwrights and long-form improv. Highlights included Toni K. Thayer's Angst:84 (which was taken to the New York Fringe Festival), LUV(SIC), and the Soap Scum improvised soap opera series.

Kilbane also began to introduce works not created by Cleveland-based playwrights, starting with Stupid Kids in 1999 and Mark Ravenhill’s Shopping and Fucking in Spring, 2002, shortly before he concluded his four years as artistic director.

The project continued through 2006 under the artistic directorship of Adrienne Moon. During these four years, when the project was called simply "The Night Kitchen", emphasis shifted away from experimental, new works by local theater artists, to works new to Cleveland by up and coming young playwrights like Stephen Belber (Tape, The Death of Frank.)

In its present incarnation, Dobama's Night Kitchen exists in name-only, to annually present the award-winning plays written by high school students for the Marilyn Bianchi Kids' Playwriting Festival.
