= Sarah Morton =

Sarah Morton may refer to:

- Sarah Morton (playwright), American playwright, actor, educator and activist
- Sarah Wentworth Apthorp Morton (1759–1846), American poet
- Sarah Morton (footballer) (born 1998), New Zealand footballer
- Sarah Morton, lead character played by Charlotte Rampling in Swimming Pool, 2003
- Sarah Morton (basketball) with Wolfenbüttel Wildcats
- Sarah Morton, a passenger of the Little James in 1623
