= Société typographique de Lausanne =

Swiss publishing company

The Société typographique de Lausanne was a Lausanne-based publishing and printing company active from 1774 to 1782.

The company was founded in March 1774 on the initiative of the publisher and printer Jean-Pierre Heubach. It brought together the interests of several shareholders: François-Jacques Durand, a professor at the Academy of Lausanne; Louis Scanavin, a merchant from Vevey; Jean-Pierre Duplan, a businessman established in Bern; and Samuel Kirchberger, a member of Bern's Council of Two Hundred. Under Heubach's technical direction, it engaged the services of Antoine Saunier, a master at the Lausanne collège, and Jean-Pierre Bérenger, hired in 1775 as a literary advisor.

After an initial partnership with the Société typographique de Neuchâtel that was undermined by mutual suspicion (1774), the Société typographique de Lausanne signed an agreement in 1778 with the typographical societies of Bern and Neuchâtel, intending to reprint new French works more quickly and without competing with one another. The particular ties between the Lausanne and Bern societies (Kirchberger was involved in both) took shape in 1778 with the joint purchase of part of the equipment of the Lex printing house at Yverdon, and above all in the octavo reprinting of the Paris Encyclopédie (1778–1781). Heubach's buyout of Kirchberger's shares in 1782 led to the dissolution of the Société typographique de Lausanne, with Heubach continuing under various business names.

== Bibliography ==
- M. Bovard-Schmidt, "Jean-Pierre Heubach, un imprimeur lausannois du XVIIIe s.", in RHV, 1966, 1–56
- S. Corsini, "Un pour tous... et chacun pour soi? Petite hist. d'une alliance entre les Sociétés typographiques de Lausanne, Berne et Neuchâtel", in Le rayonnement d'une maison d'édition dans l'Europe des Lumières: la Soc. typographique de Neuchâtel, 1769-1789, ed. R. Darnton, M. Schlup, 2005, 115–137
