= David Hansen (playwright) =

American actor, director and playwright

- Born: July 26, 1968 (age 58)
- Occupations: Stage actor, director, playwright
- Spouse: Toni K. Thayer
- Website: http://davidhansen.org

David Hansen (born July 26, 1968) is an American playwright, actor, director and arts educator. He is the founder of Dobama's Night Kitchen and co-founder of Guerrilla Theater Company and Bad Epitaph Theater Company.

He is a graduate of Bay Village High School, and holds a BFA in Theater from Ohio University and an MFA in Playwriting from Cleveland State. He is married to writer Toni K. Thayer. He is currently Education Outreach Associate for Great Lakes Theater.

== Awards ==
- (2021) Sherlock Holmes Meets the Bully of Baker Street: Shubert Fendrich Memorial Playwriting Contest
- (2010) Community Workforce Fellow, Community Partnership for Arts and Culture
- (2006) Spencer Tunick In Cleveland: First Place Use of Sound (with Toni K. Thayer and Dave DeOreo for WCPN) from the Press Club of Cleveland
- (2004) I Hate This: A Play Without the Baby: Excellence in Solo Performance at the New York International Fringe Festival

== Published works ==
- (2020) Sherlock Holmes Meets the Bully of Baker Street based on characters by Arthur Conan Doyle published by Pioneer Drama Service
- (2018) Red Onion, White Garlic (A Tale of Indonesia) published by YouthPLAYS
- (2016) The Secret Adversary adaptation of the novel by Agatha Christie published by YouthPLAYS
- (2013) Double Heart (The Courtship of Beatrice and Benedick) published by YouthPLAYS
- (2012) The Mysterious Affair at Styles adaptation of the novel by Agatha Christie published by Playscripts Inc.

== Other Produced Works ==
- (2024) The Toothpaste Millionaire (based on the book by Jean Merrill)
- (2021) Savory Taṇhā (sixteen short plays performed by a rotating ensemble) a Zoom play
- (2019) The Way I Danced With You (The George Michael Play)
- (2019) About a Ghoul
- (2016) Twelfth Night (As Told By Malvolio) adapted from Shakespeare
- (2015) Rosalynde & The Falcon
- (2015) The Great Globe Itself
- (2013) Adventures in Slumberland based on characters by Winsor McCay
- (2010) On The Dark Side of Twilight (Evolution of the Vampire)
- (2009) And Then You Die (How I Ran a Marathon in 26.2 Years)
- (2003) I Hate This: A Play Without the Baby
- (1997) The Vampyres

== One Acts and 10-Minute Plays ==
- (2023) Step Nine
- (2022) Here's To You, Mrs. Robinson
- (2018) Screen Play
- (2017) No Cure For Cancer
- (2015) On the Beam (part of The Cleveland Play House Centennial Plays)
- (2015) Tiresias Riddles The Fates
- (2014) Lombardo
- (2011) The Lady

== Collaborations ==
- (2021) 10 Minutes to Midnight: 9 Quirky Plays for the Holidays with Dayshawnda Ash, Melissa Crum, Emma James Dahl, John Dayo-Aliya & Maya Malan-Gonzalez
- (2014) Seven Ages with Nina Domingue, Mike Geither, Christine Howey, Anne McEvoy, Michael Oatman & Toni K. Thayer
- (2001) The Gulf with Joshua D. Brown, Kelly Elliott, Brian Fox, Margi Herwald, Derek Koger, Leah D. Krauss, Heather N. Stout & Sean Sullivan
- (1998) Cole Cuts with David Bell, Suzanne L. Miller & Toni K. Thayer
- (1996) This Vicious Cabaret with Erin Myers, Mike Schmidt, Toni K. Thayer & Jenna Weiss
- (1993) Mind Your Own Business rotating sketch show, written by ensemble
- (1992) You Have the Right to Remain Silent! rotating sketch show, written by ensemble

== Performances in plays by contemporary playwrights ==
Hansen often performs in his own plays, and also has a history of performances in new or recently developed works by notable modern playwrights, including:

- (2015) White Rabbit Red Rabbit by Nassim Soleimanpour at Cleveland Public Theatre Pre-Off-Broadway
- (2013) 8 by Dustin Lance Black at Cleveland Play House
- (2012) The Velocity of Autumn by Eric Coble at Beck Center For the Arts Pre-Arena/Broadway
