= I Hate This =

Play written by David Hansen

I Hate This (a play without the baby)
- Promotional image, 2003 (Anthony Gray)
- Written by: David Hansen
- Original language: English
- Subject: Loss of a stillborn child, told from a father's perspective.
- Genre: Monodrama
- Setting: 2001, in a hospital, various other locations

Premiere
- Date premiered: February 28, 2003
- Place premiered: Cleveland Public Theatre; Cleveland, OH

I Hate This (a play without the baby) is a solo performance by David Hansen detailing his experiences as the father of a stillborn child.

== Synopsis ==
At their thirty-week prenatal appointment, the playwright and his wife discover their first child has died due to preeclampsia. The events of the play cover the thirty-six hours between that revelation and the birth of their son, and also events during the year that leads up to this child's first birthday, all from the point of view of the father. In twenty-seven short scenes, the narrator performs a dozen characters including members of his family, friends, and a number of health care professionals and counselors.

"By elucidating such mundane moments as his futile attempts to be removed from a baby-food company mailing list, Hansen gives us a glimpse into day-to-day life after a baby dies."

- Laura Seftel, Grief Unseen

== Critical response ==
New York Times critic Jason Zinoman called I Hate This, "A well-made and often affecting drama." Deb Hoodiman, writing for nytheatre.com called the production, "Powerful, sad and enjoyable," and Kate Morris writing for The Skinny (UK) called the play, "sincere and powerful."

== Production history ==
First produced at Cleveland Public Theatre in 2003, this award-winning performance has been presented at the Minnesota Fringe Festival and the New York Fringe Festival, as well as for numerous bereavement organisations in the United States and in Great Britain, and as a training event at hospitals for midwives, nurses and doctors. The production was revived by the playwright at Cleveland Public Theater in April, 2011.

In October 2014, the play was first performed in its entirety by a different actor than David Hansen. Freerange Theatre Company produced I Hate This at The Lowry Studio Theatre in Manchester, England. The role of David was played by John Dayton, directed by Hugo Chandor.

In November 2015, I Hate This was produced at Hartwick College in Oneonta, New York in a fully realized production directed, designed and performed by Brian Chandler Cook.

In March 2021, the play was produced by the Chennai Art Theatre and performed at the Alliance Française de Madras in Chennai, India, in a production directed by Denver Anthony Nicholas. For this Indian production, the title was changed to What Happened. The role of David was played by Karthik TMK, and in a unique turn the female roles were performed by a different actor; Mrittika Chatterjee.

== Film adaptation ==
Playhouse Square in collaboration with University Hospitals produced a video adaptation of I Hate This: A Play Without the Baby which received a world premiere screening at the Westfield Studio Theatre in Cleveland, OH, on October 15, 2022, coinciding with World Pregnancy and Infant Loss Remembrance Day. Actor James Alexander Rankin performed all roles in this seventy minute film, directed by Chennelle Bryant-Harris and filmed by Ananias J. Dixon. The Executive Producer was Daniel K. Hahn, Playhouse Square Vice President of Education.

== Radio adaptation ==
Northeast Ohio NPR affiliate WCPN (90.3 FM) (now WCLV) created a radio adaptation of I Hate This which was first broadcast on November 25, 2005. For this adaptation, David Hansen provided the voice for his own character, with all other characters and the narrator voiced by notable Cleveland-area performers including Dorothy and Reuben Silver, Nina Domingue, Betsy Hogg and Nick Koesters. The program was produced by Hansen, Dave DeOreo, and Al Dahlhausen.

This radio drama adaptation of I Hate This received awards from the Ohio Society for Professional Journalists Awards (Best Radio Documentary, First Place, 2006) and the WBEZ Third Coast International Audio Festival (Finalist, 2007).
