= Typographische Gesellschaft Bern =

Swiss publishing company

The Typographische Gesellschaft Bern (French: Société typographique de Berne) was a Bern-based publishing and bookselling company active from 1758 to 1798.

It was founded in 1758 by Vinzenz Bernhard Tscharner and Fortuné-Barthélemy de Félice under the name Tscharners Bücherladen (Tscharner's bookshop), taking the name Typographische Gesellschaft Bern from 1762. Tscharner remained one of its directors until 1778. From 1764 to 1775 the company had its works printed by Albrecht Emanuel Haller and Daniel Brunner before establishing its own printing house. It published 156 titles, most of them in German and French, and between 1762 and 1782 it sold its editions at the German book fairs.

== Division and later years ==
After Tscharner's death in 1778, the company was split into two houses, the Typographische Gesellschaft and the Neue Typographische Gesellschaft. The first was the less important of the two, though it published among other works the Mémoires et observations de la Société œconomique de Berne. From 1778 to 1782 the second formed a "confederation" with the Société typographique de Neuchâtel and the Société typographique de Lausanne, producing joint publications, chiefly reprints; together with the Lausanne society it also produced an octavo reprint of the Paris Encyclopédie (1778–1781).

The two Bernese enterprises were reunited in 1793 under the direction of Johann Georg Heinzmann. In 1795, seeking to strengthen its presence at the book fairs, the company considered opening a branch in Leipzig. It ceased operations in 1798.

== Bibliography ==
- J. Lindt, Die Typographische Gesellschaft in Bern, 1958
- S. Bösiger, "Aufklärung als Geschäft: die Typographische Gesellschaft Bern", in BEZG, 75, 2011, 3–46
