= Susie Frazier =

American artist

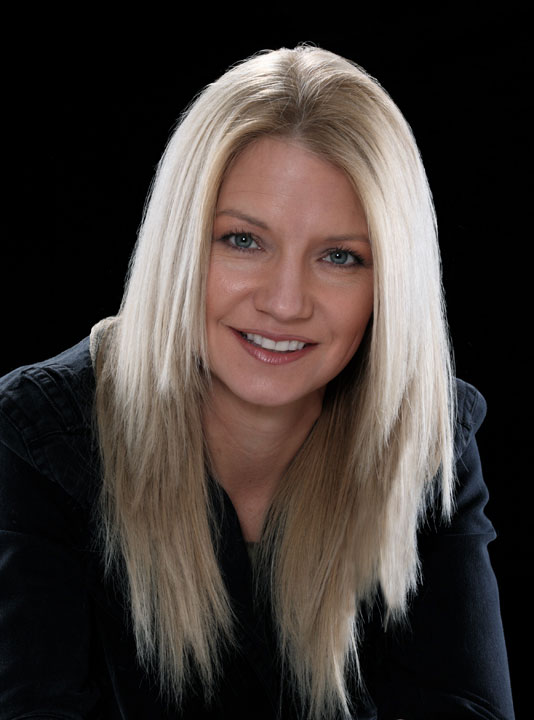
- Born: Susan Lakas Frazier; Denver, Colorado, U.S.
- Known for: Environmental Art,
- Spouse: formerly Tim Mueller 2000-2018
- Website: Susie Frazier http://www.susiefrazier.com

Susie Frazier is an American artist who designs by integrating natural materials and organic patterns into her work. Her creations are characterized by repeating, irregular contours and slight imperfections in the materials.

== Early life and education ==
Frazier was born August in Inglewood, California, and graduated from the University of Colorado at Boulder in 1993, with a BA in Communications. In 1992 she moved to Cleveland, Ohio. She was a German Marshall Fund fellow.

== Career ==
In 2007, she was selected to design integrated public art elements of a $3.5 million streetscape in Cleveland's Gordon Square Arts District, which was completed in 2009. and in 2013, Frazier was selected to design a terrazzo floor pattern for a newly-constructed RTA Rapid Transit station in Cleveland's Little Italy neighborhood.

In 2003, she founded a downtown Cleveland marketing program called "Sparx in the City", which earned the City of Cleveland a City Livability Award by the U.S. Conference of Mayors in 2005. In 2005 Frazier turned the program over to the Downtown Cleveland Alliance, and it operates today under the name Sparx City Hop.

Since 2016 she has been the brand ambassador for Mont Surfaces.

== Awards ==
In 2018, Frazier was awarded a Regional Emmy as producer of a TV pilot she starred in called Movers & Makers With Susie Frazier.

== Books ==
- 2018: Designing For Wellness, BookBaby, ISBN 978-1543951189
