= Near West Theatre =

Coordinates: 41.484147°N 81.731617°W

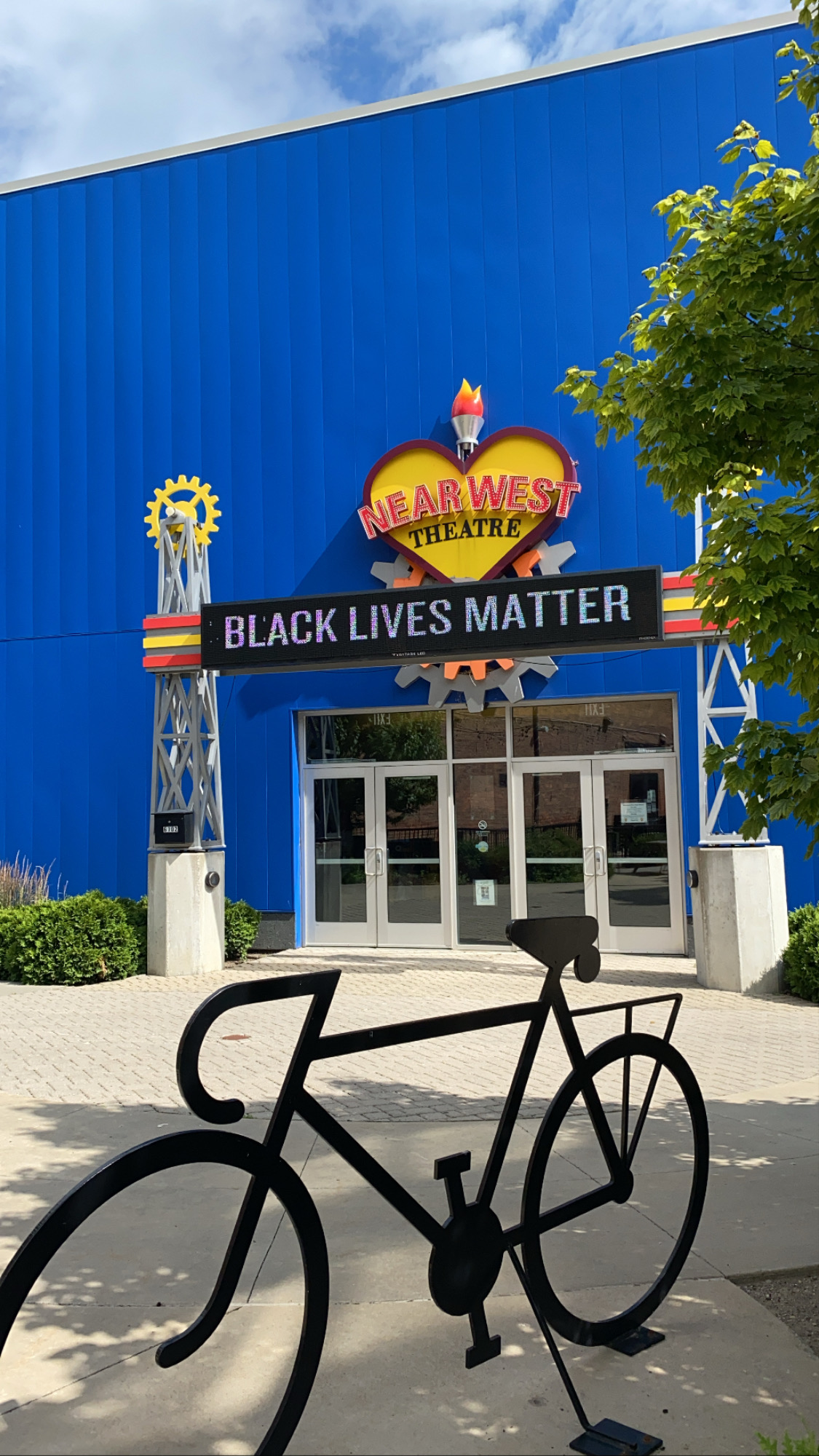
- Opened: February 28, 2015; 10 years ago

Near West Theatre is an independent, nonprofit theatre troupe housed in a 275-seat venue in the Gordon Square Arts District of the Detroit-Shoreway neighborhood of Cleveland, Ohio. Located along the major thoroughfare Detroit Avenue, two blocks from Cleveland Public Theatre, Near West specializes in musical productions with casts of all ages, with a special emphasis on serving at-risk youth in the Cleveland area. It was founded in May 1978 by Stephanie Morrison, George Hrbek, and Robert Scullin as the Near West Side Shared Ministry Youth Theatre. Its first musical director was Robert Schenk, who directed a production of Godspell in the summer of 1978. The troupe built its new facility over the course of 2014 for $7.3 million, which it raised as part of a wider $30 million Gordon Square Arts District campaign. From 1978 to 2014, the theatre performed in the third-floor ballroom of St. Patrick Church's Catholic Club Building at 3006 Bridge Ave. in Cleveland's Ohio City neighborhood. Prior to opening its state-of-the-art space in 2015, the company rented out various spaces to mount their sizable productions.
