= The English Theatre Frankfurt =

Theatre in Frankfurt am Main, Germany

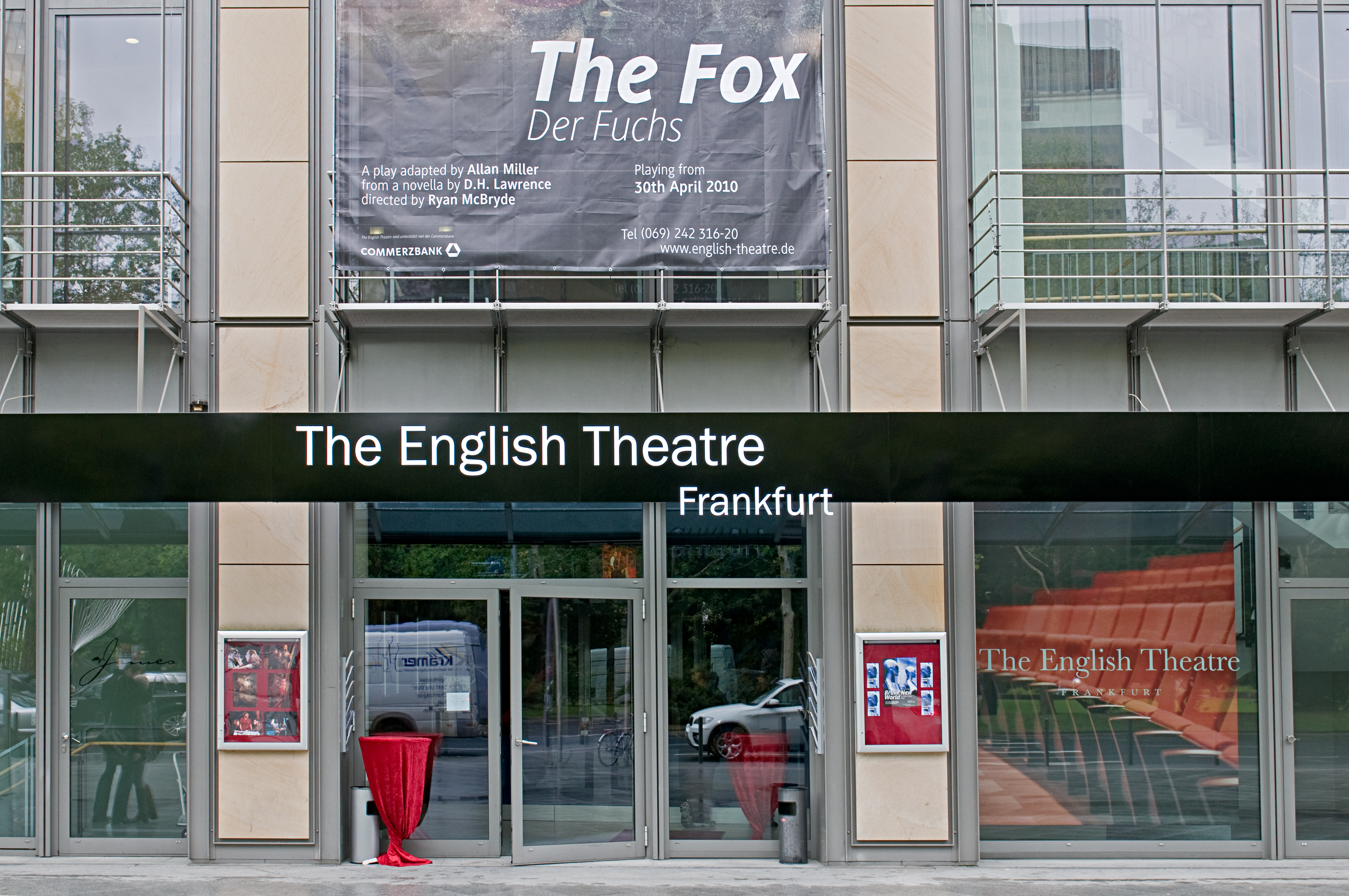
- The English Theatre at Taunusanlage.
- Interactive map of The English Theatre Frankfurt
- Address: Bernhard-Grzimek-Allee 1 Frankfurt am Main; Germany
- Capacity: 265
- Public transit: Zoo Frankfurt

Construction
- Opened: 1979
- Reopened: 2003

Website
- http://www.english-theatre.de/

The English Theatre Frankfurt is a 300-seat theatre located at the Gallileo skyscraper. Founded more than 30 years ago, it is continental Europe's largest English-speaking theatre. Each season, more than 60,000 patrons visits its wide range of classics, comedies, thrillers and musicals. In terms of its audience, 70 percent are native German speakers and 30 percent are from the extensive English-speaking community at home in and around Frankfurt.

== History ==
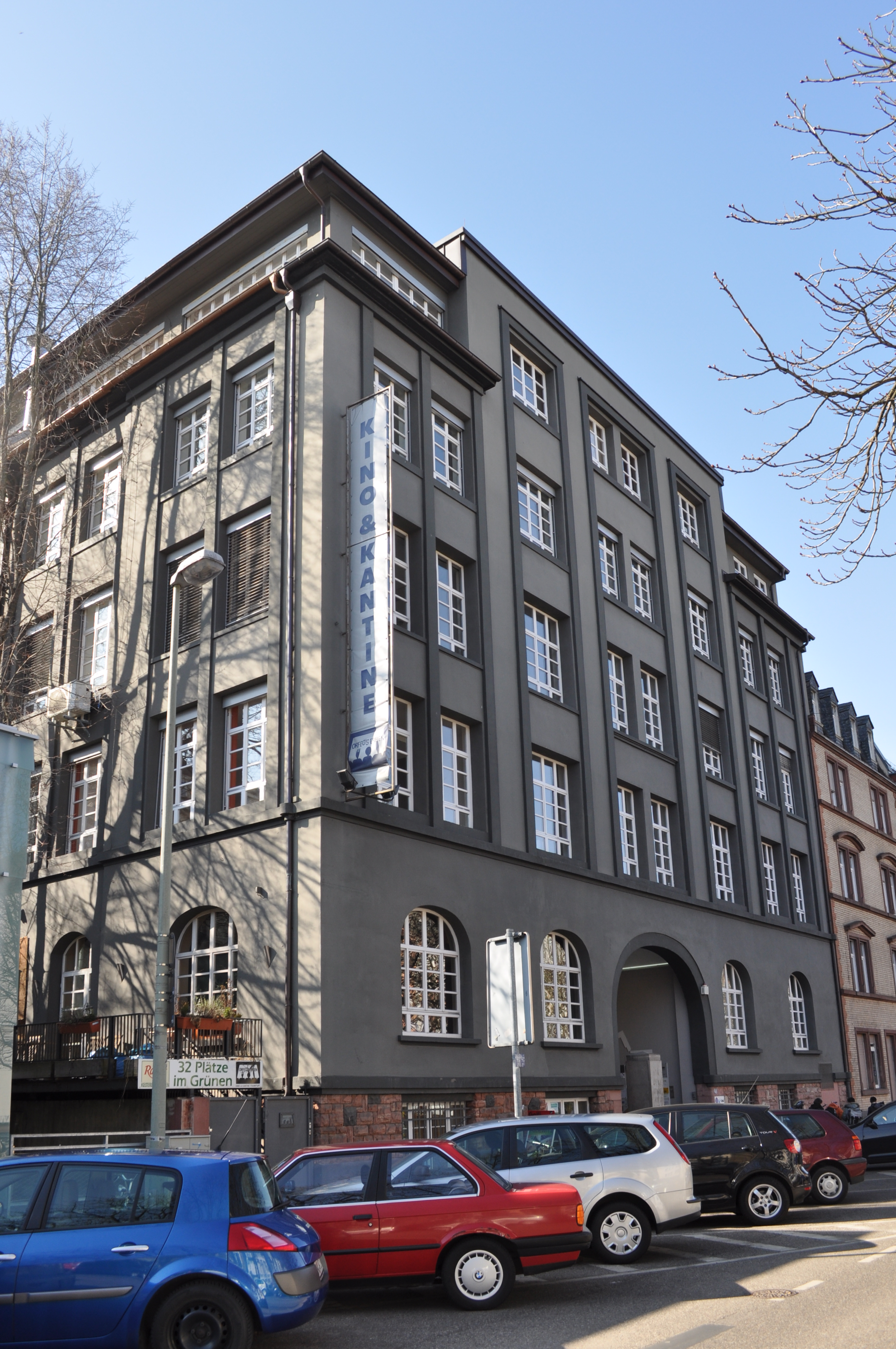
Hamburger Allee 45 1981–1990 venue of the theatre

1979 Frankfurt's first English-language theatre is founded in Sachsenhausen by Kevin Oakes from South Africa and Jon Johnson, Mary Jackson and Ken Elrod from the United States. Kevin Oakes becomes the theatre's artistic director. The ensemble is called cardboard clowns.

1980 Judith Rosenbauer joins the ensemble as an actress and later on becomes its managing director. Shortly thereafter the ensemble disbands. Judith Rosenbauer, Darryl Lockwood and Keith LeFevre continue its activities under the name “Café Theater.”

1981 The theatre moves from Sachsenhausen into a larger space in the Hamburger Allee and is now called “English Theater Frankfurt, Café Theater.”

1990 Thanks to its growing popularity under Judith Rosenbauer's direction, the theatre again relocates and is now housed in a 230-seat facility in Frankfurt's famous Kaiserstraße.

1992, the English Theatre in Frankfurt became the first German theatre to stage a play by August Wilson ("Fences").

2001 The Kaiserstrasse is now too small for the English Theatre's growing programme. Thanks to Judith Rosenbauer's initiative and Dr. von Harbou's far-sighted vision, the Dresdner Bank agrees to include a playhouse in its new Gallileo skyscraper. Unfortunately, as a result of economic difficulties, the “English Theater e.V.” must close its doors. Judith Rosenbauer terminates her involvement with the English Theatre.

2002 To keep the tradition of English-language theatre in Frankfurt alive, The English Theatre, a limited charity, is founded. Daniel John Nicolai becomes artistic and executive director of the new organization, which begins co-producing with other theatres in Vienna, Los Angeles and New Jersey.

2003 The English Theatre GmbH moves into its new 300-seat home, sponsored by the Dresdner Bank (now Commerzbank).

In 2018, Commerzbank sold the Gallileo skyscraper to the Singapo-based real estate investor CapitaLand. The sublease contract of the English Theatre ended in April. After negotiations with the new investor failed, Commerzbank files an action for eviction in June 2023.

== Productions ==
Each season the theatre produces a mixture of classics, comedies, thrillers, and contemporary plays as well as musicals. The casting and rehearsal of the theatre's own productions are held in London or New York.

The theatre has produced over a 190 productions including German premiere of musicals Spring Awakening (Duncan Sheik and Steven Sater), The Full Monty (Terrence McNally and David Yazbek) and the South African musical Kat and the Kings (David Kramer and Taliep Peterson) and upcoming Ghost the Musical by Bruce Joel Rubin, Dave Stewart and Glen Ballard.

Plays which have had their German premieres at the English Theatre include Fences by August Wilson, Killer Joe by Tracy Letts, Someone Who'll Watch Over Me by Frank McGuinness, Proof by David Auburn, Life After George by Hannie Rayson, A Picasso by Jefrey Hatcher, The Dead Guy by Eric Colbe and Good People (play) by David Lindsay-Abaire. The theatre's first world premiere is The Vanishing Room by David Byrne and Olivia Hirst, which was also written in workshop sessions at the theatre.

The majority of the actors come from English speaking countries. Directors work on a free-lance basis, and like actors, are chosen for a specific play. For each production a new group of actors is assembled. For these purposes the theatre has an casting agent and stage manager based in London. Rehearsals take place in London, then continue on stage in Frankfurt shortly before the premiere.

The only German actress who had her stage début at The English Theatre Frankfurt was the moderator Sonya Kraus, playing a German Nazi agent in the play "A Picasso", directed by Gareth Armstrong in 2007/2008.

== Drama Club ==
Since 2005, the theatre has been home to DramaClub, which cooperates with professional and nonprofessional actors to work on their own specially-produced plays under professional guidance.

== Theatre and school ==
The English Theatre Frankfurt has been showing matinees for school classes since 2006 and makes an important contribution to the promotion of language and theater education. Once a season, the theater also puts on a production specifically aimed at students learning English. These morning shows are usually presented for one week in spring. In recent years, about 4,500 students attended The English Theatre Frankfurt.

== Special events ==
2009 live Poetry Slam Deluxe (German spoken) was added to the standard bill of fare at the theatre. James is an integral part of the theatre's ambience. It has two levels, with a gallery upstairs and a performance space downstairs, where exhibitions (Journeys in Afghanistan by Steve McCurry), readings (David Sedaris, Lisa See, Richard Powers, Merlin Holland etc.) and cabaret shows take place. The Internationale Stammtisch, which takes place on the first Monday of the month at the James Bar, is an initiative of the City of Frankfurt. The activities are aimed at both locals interested in other parts of the world and those new to Frankfurt.
