= Belfry Players =

Theater in Wisconsin, USA

Belfry Music Theatre
- Belfry Music Theatre
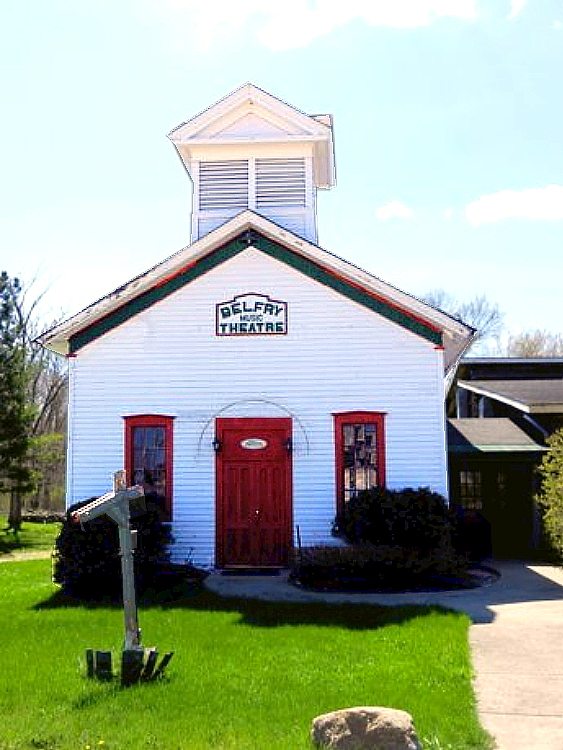
- Belfry Music Theatre
- Interactive map of Belfry Music Theatre
- Former names: Belfry Players
- Location: Highway 67; Delavan, Wisconsin
- Coordinates: 42°35′49″N 88°32′29″W
- Owner: Transformative Arts
- Operator: Transformative Arts
- Seating type: Reserved
- Capacity: 240
- Type: Indoor

Construction
- Built: 1888
- Reopened: 2016

Website
- Venue Info

The Belfry Music Theatre, formerly known as the Belfry Theater and The Belfry Players, is a theater facility and acting company in the town of Delavan, adjacent to the village of Williams Bay, Wisconsin. Established in a former church building, the Belfry was the first summer stock theater in Wisconsin. The theater operated as a stock company from 1935 until 1969, providing early professional experience to thespians like Paul Newman, Del Close, Gary Burghoff and Harrison Ford. The venue continued operating for local productions for many years, for a short time as an adjunct to Cleveland's Dobama Theater. In 2016, The Belfry Music Theatre was renovated, and opened to the public as a music concert and event venue.

Located on Bailey Road south of the intersection of highways 50 and 67, on what was once called Delap Corners, the Belfry produced seasonal productions from the early 1930s through the 1970s and sporadically thereafter. The non-profit company was a rural "straw hat" repertory troupe. The land was owned by the Delap family. They came from Chicago and settled in the Delavan area. It was housed in a converted church of the Reorganized Church of Jesus Christ of Latter Day Saints. The church was erected in 1888 and adapted for theatrical purposes in the 1930s. The producing group called the Belfry Players first leased the building in 1934, then purchased it in 1938. A large shed was later added to the theater to provide space for scenic construction and storage. Nearby Crane Hall, more recently named Belfry House, served as a dormitory for resident company members.

In the late 1960s, the Belfry Theater was imperiled by a highway widening project. Although the theater building was moved and its existence saved, the company's debts forced it to suspend production between 1969 and 1976. Barry E. Silverman, a director of the Dobama Theater of Cleveland, assumed proprietorship of the Belfry in 1976, dubbed his operating company "Dobama West," and revived producing for three years, closing after the 1980 season.

After regular annual productions ceased, "occasional revivals and performances were booked at the Belfry into the 1990s," as, for example, when showman Eddie Cash presented musical tributes to popular singers. The Belfry was still producing as late as 1990. The theater buildings were purchased in November 2013 by Transformative Arts, Inc., a Christian theatrical production company.

== Players ==
For most of its history, the Belfry acting company, a combination of local amateurs and a stipended resident corps of non-Equity actors, presented a summer series of six plays back to back, with a new production opening every two weeks. In the early days, actors who received pay were often required to spend hours constructing and painting settings and props in the scene shop. The company received financial support from its box office, from advertisers, and from dues-paying life members. Under Dobama West in the 1970s, the pay was scaled somewhat higher for actors to concentrate on just acting. Several well-known actors received their early career opportunities at the Belfry, including Paul Newman (1949), Del Close (1953), Gary Burghoff (1962), and Harrison Ford (1964). Among the company's resident directors were Leo M. Jones (1949), Lance Goss (1959, 1960), Frank C. Davidson (1951, 1961) and Keith Fowler (1962).

Under the original Belfry management, actors often found the pace of the Belfry's repertory system—in which they rehearsed and worked in the scene shop all day and performed nearly every night—to be exhausting, but an effective form of training. Some took exception to the kind of learning the schedule imposed on them. Paul Newman remembered his Belfry rehearsals, saying "[T]he only thing you do ...in such a short time to prepare, is to develop your bad mannerisms, or discover possibly successful mannerisms--but mannerisms nevertheless. Sure, what can you do in four days of rehearsal? You can hope to Christ that you can remember your lines, and that’s about as far as it goes.” Others felt the experience was valuable for teaching young actors what was necessary to make their characters' traits clear and to sell plots in many different styles to an audience.

== Productions ==
As long as the Belfry's bell functioned, it was rung to announce the curtain time.

Two plays were presented in the first season, 1934: The Youngest, followed by Laff That Off.

Over the first few summers, the number of shows was gradually increased until a peak of eight productions was reached in 1938. By 1940, the count was stabilized at six titles per season through the early '60s, with only an occasional anomalous number.

Most plays were typical summer escapist fare, such as comedies by Noël Coward (Hay Fever) and George S. Kaufman (George Washington Slept Here) and light mysteries by Agatha Christie (Ten Little Indians). In the 1950s and '60s, Belfry occasionally attempted more serious fare by Arthur Miller (All My Sons), Tennessee Williams (The Glass Menagerie), and Peter Shaffer (Five Finger Exercise). Musicals (Babes in Arms, The Boy Friend) were added in the early 1960s. Under the Dobama West aegis, the number of musicals was increased, including as many as three in a season (1978): The Roar of the Greasepaint, the Smell of the Crowd; Side by Side by Sondheim; and Oklahoma!.

The present theater marquee proclaims it as the "Belfry Music Theatre."
