= Alison Garrigan =

American actress

- Born: September 1958 (age 67–68)
- Occupations: Actor, singer, costume designer

Alison Garrigan aka Alison Hernan (born September 1958) is an American actress, singer, and costume designer based in Cleveland, Ohio, the daughter of actors Jonathan and Jo Farwell. She is well known for playing both male and female roles.

== Career ==
She has performed in gothic/industrial bands as well and has a cabaret/nightclub act with Michael Seevers called Torch. She is a self-described "goth-punk vampire bat". She and co-writer/guitarist Dennis Yurich reformed their Goth/Steampunk band "Queue Up" in 2008.

She appeared in David Hansen's I Hate This.

She is married, mother of a grown up son, and is openly bisexual.

She played Dr. Frank-N-Furter in Cleveland Public Theatre's Christmas production of "The Rocky Horror Show" in 2006, having previously played the part of Janet.

In January 2007 she starred in Ms. Adventures, 'a one-woman safari through the American gender jungle' by Michael Sepesy. The show was revived in 2008.

In December 2007 she appeared in the musical Pulp. Of her part it was said, "It's Alison Garrigan's Viviane, however, that dominates. The constantly employed Garrigan, whether in musical or straight parts, never fails to impress" and "[Garrigan] slinks around in a gown (she's also the costume designer) in a way sure to excite folks of any sexual orientation.". About her part in The Breakup Notebook: The Lesbian Musical in February 2008 it was said, "At the peak of comic perfection, Alison Garrigan etches out a nervous lesbian with bisexual pretensions".

== Roles ==
Male

- Dr. Frank-N-Furter in The Rocky Horror Show
- Yitzhak in Hedwig and the Angry Inch
- Cassius in Shakespeare's Julius Caesar
- Earl of Kent in King Lear

Female

- Zillah in Bright Room Called Day
- Morgan le Fey in Discordia
- Elaine in The Dying Gaul
- Delilah Strict in Zombie Prom
- Mazeppa in Gypsy
- Miss Delilah Strict in Zombie Prom
- The occult tattoo artist in Rinde Eckert's opera Highway Ulysses
- Susan in The Secretaries
- Hester Salomon in Equus
- Viviane in the musical Pulp
- Mrs. Lovett in "Sweeney Todd"

== Directing credits ==
- Antony and Cleopatra
- The Alice Seed (Cleveland Public Theatre)
- Kill Will (Cleveland Public Theatre and Minnesota Fringe Festival)
- And Then You Die (Cleveland Public Theatre and New York Fringe Festival)
- Othello (Bad Epitaph Theater Company)
- The Vampyres (Cleveland Public Theatre)
- Hedwig and the Angry Inch (Yurich Productions)
