= Gallileo (skyscraper) =

Skyscraper in Frankfurt, Germany

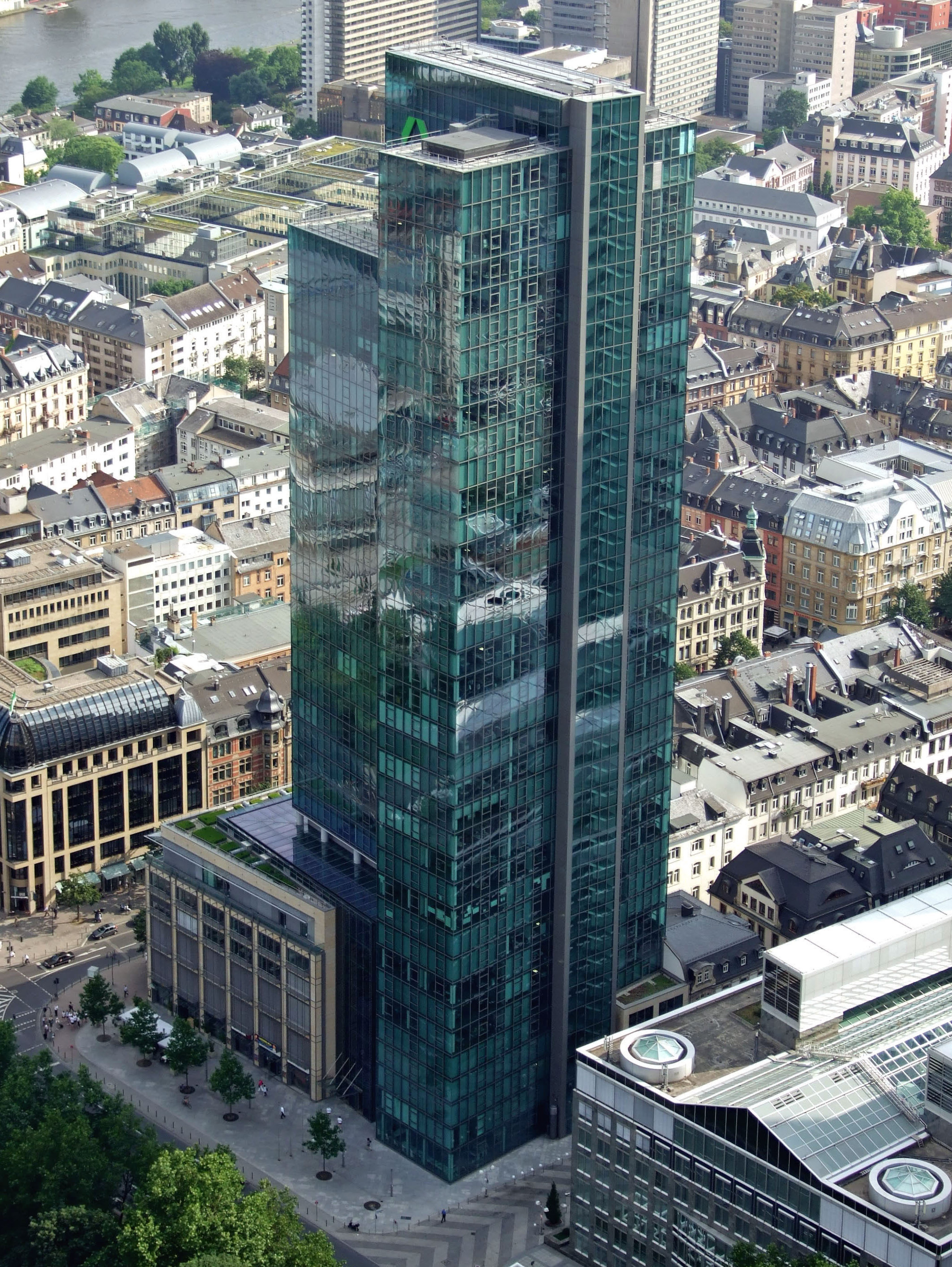
- Gallileo viewed from Main Tower
- Interactive map of the Gallileo area

General information
- Type: Commercial offices
- Location: Gallusanlage 7 Frankfurt; Hesse, Germany
- Coordinates: 50°06′34″N 08°40′16″E
- Construction started: 2000
- Completed: 2003
- Cost: US$180 million
- Owner: Capitaland

Height
- Roof: 136 m (446 ft)

Technical details
- Floor count: 38; 3 below ground
- Floor area: 57,450 m^{2} (618,400 sq ft)
- Lifts/elevators: 14

Design and construction
- Architect: Novotny Mähner Assoziierte
- Main contractor: Bilfinger Berger SE

Gallileo is a 38-storey 136 m (446 ft) skyscraper in the Bahnhofsviertel district of Frankfurt, Germany. It was built from 1999 to 2003.

The towers architecture is made up of two towers linked by a connecting central core. The north tower is 136 m (446 ft) with 38 storeys, and the south tower is 114 m (374 ft). The core is the building's full height. Together with its 49,000 m^{2} (530,000 sq ft) floor space, it is the 26th tallest building in the city. Its name is an intentional misspelling of the scientist Galileo's name; the extra l comes from the building's other namesake, the nearby park Gallusanlage. Along with the nearby Silberturm, it served as the corporate headquarters of Dresdner Bank since 2008. A year later, after the takeover of Dresdner Bank by Commerzbank, the new owner planned to use only the Gallileo.

Gallileo has a glass facade with 400 individual windows forming an approximately 22,000 m^{2} (240,000 sq ft) large transparent outer skin. In the glass floors were the American artist James Turrell, integrated lighting, which make the building at night from the inside out glowing. These are not architecturally visible. The undersides of the floor slabs serve as reflective surfaces.

Shops, a bar, and the English Theatre Frankfurt are located on the ground floor.

In 2018, Gallileo was sold to the Singapore-based real estate investor CapitaLand for €356 million, with Commerzbank retaining a long-term lease. Further, in 2022 Commerzbank's rent-free sublease contract of the basement theater space to the English Theatre ended. After negotiations with the new investor failed, in June 2023 Commerzbank filed an action to evict the theatre.

== See also ==
- List of tallest buildings in Frankfurt
- List of tallest buildings in Germany
