= Geiger's =

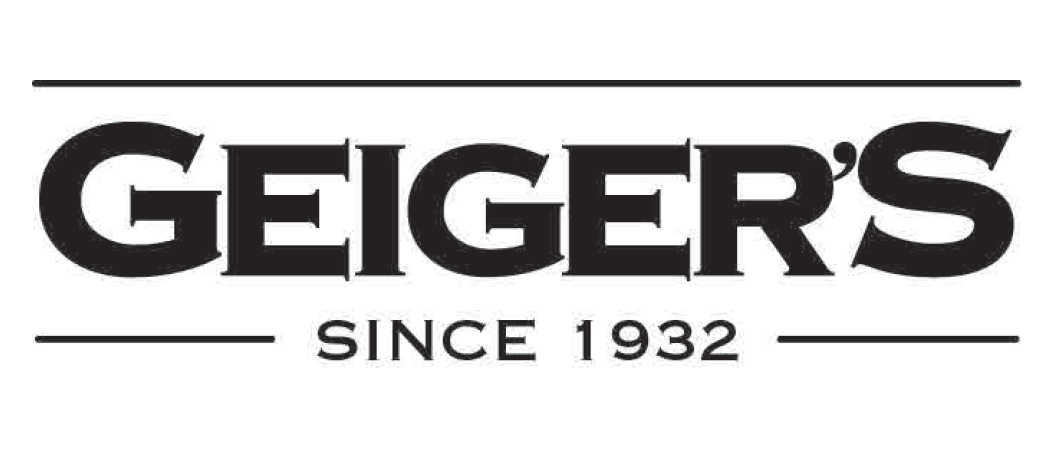
- Type: Private company
- Industry: Retail (Clothing, snow sports, sporting goods)
- Founded: 1932
- Headquarters: Lakewood, Ohio
- Areas served: Northeast Ohio, Western Pennsylvania, Western New York
- Key people: Chas Geiger President; Gordon Geiger Executive Vice President
- Website: http://shopgeigers.com

Geiger's is a multi-unit retailer in northeast Ohio. Founded in 1932 by W. Charles "Charley" Geiger Sr., the company markets men's and women's clothing and activewear, including shoes, ski and snowboard equipment and accessories, sporting goods and tailored men's clothing at its main store and headquarters in Lakewood and stores in Chagrin Falls and Cleveland.

Charley Sr. ran the business until his death in 1949, when his widow Ottillia and sons W. Charles "Charley" Jr. and twins Donald E. and Douglas A. took over. Charley Jr. remained active in the business until his death in 1992. At that time, W. Charles "Chas" Geiger became the Chief Executive Officer and has remained since.

The company's client base includes northeast Ohio, northwestern Pennsylvania and western New York. Geiger's has operated satellite locations, including Geiger's at Peek'n Peak Resort (Clymer, NY); Geiger's at Boston Mills Ski Area (Peninsula, OH); Geiger's Courtside at River Oaks Racquet Club (Rocky River, OH); the Jack ‘n Jill Shops and Gordo's Board & Skate, a specialty "snowboard only" retail stores in Lakewood. Geiger's also has an active online business.

== Early history ==
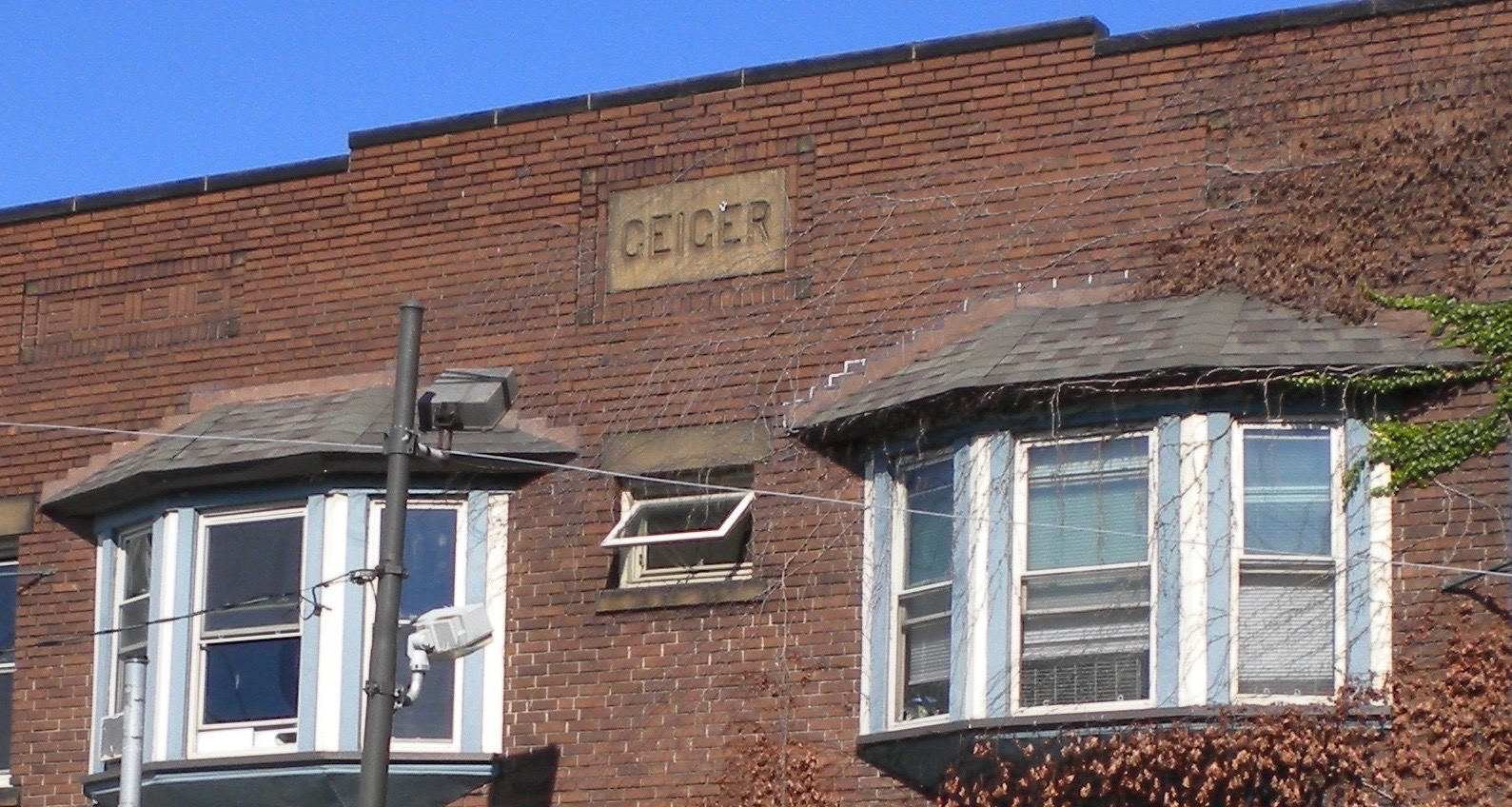
Photo of the first Geiger's at W. 75 and Lorain Cleveland

In 1918, Charley's brother, Howard Geiger, founded a men's clothing business in Cleveland. The first store was located near West 75th and Detroit Avenue in what is now the city's Detroit-Shoreway neighborhood. Charley joined brother Howard in 1919. Howard expanded his business, first to eight stores then, in 1928, to a total of 13 stores, most of which were closed in 1929–1930 due to the Great Depression.

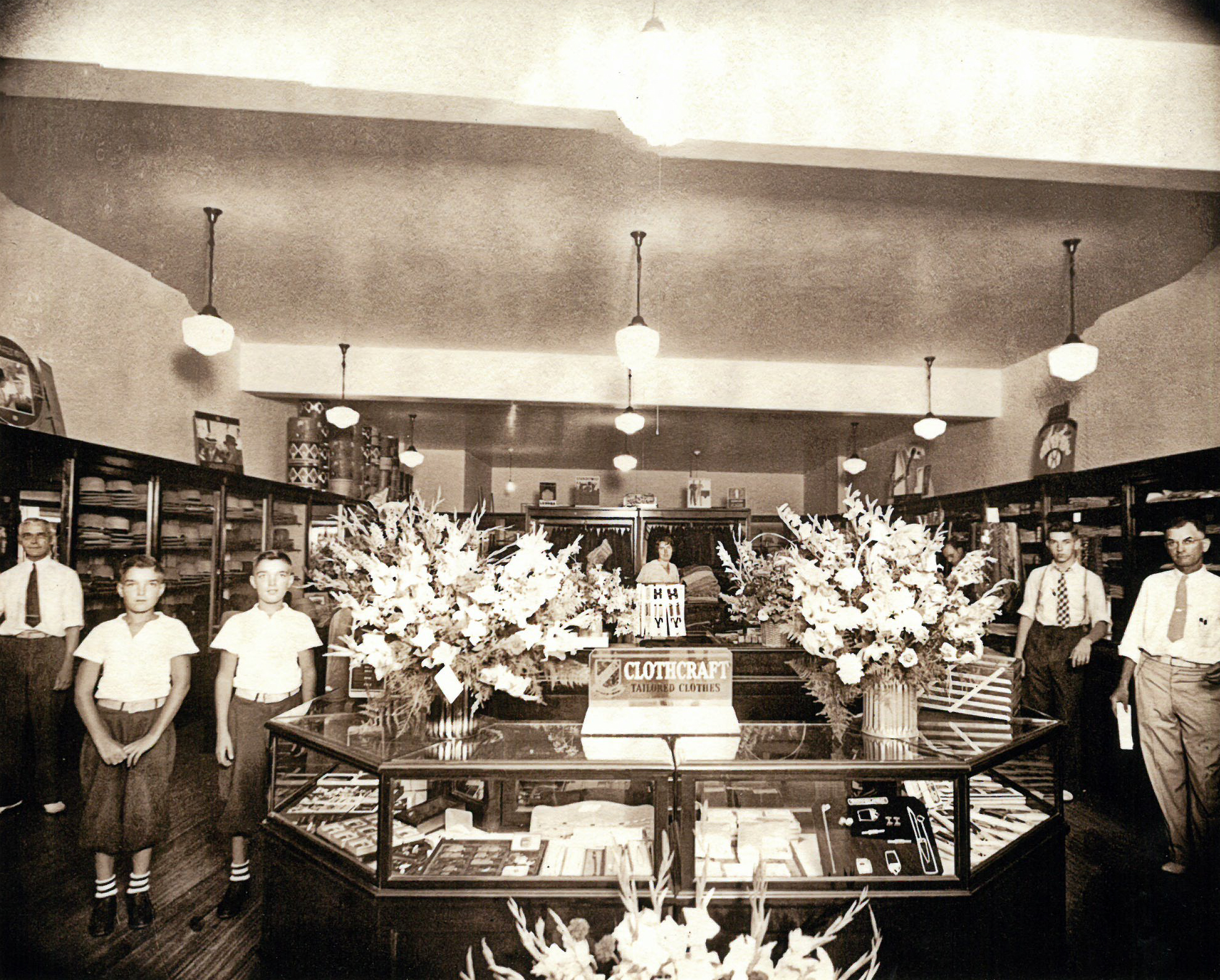
Geiger's staff in 1933

In 1932 Charley Sr started a men's clothing establishment, "Charley Geiger's Haberdashery", in a storefront at the corner of Warren Road and Detroit Avenue in downtown Lakewood, Ohio. In 1936, he moved three storefronts east to 14710 Detroit Avenue where Geiger's main store and headquarters stand today. Geiger's, according to the Lakewood Post, was "…a new store, new fixtures, complete stocks of nationally advertised merchandise, and a continuation of the policies that have drastically increased his (Geiger's) business."

== Sporting goods ==
=== Softball ===
In the 1930s and 1940s, Lakewood, Ohio became a center of world softball. The country's first lighted softball stadium was built on a site originally owned by the Lakewood Tennis Club. Built in 1915 and purchased by the Lakewood Lodge of Elks (BPOE) in 1917, Elks' Field, as it was known, was where the World Softball Championships were played in 1944 and 1946. The location is presently a supermarket. Geiger's began its involvement in sports when it supported the Lakewood Department of Recreation and became involved in adult softball.

=== Other sports ===
After World War II, Geiger's sponsored hardball teams, Little League, and other youth programs as well as winter indoor soccer, basketball, outdoor soccer, major and PeeWee baseball and autumn youth touch football. As the Recreation Department grew, Geiger's involvement became greater, and its men's clothing business operations expanded to include sporting goods.

In 2017 Geiger's was named "Cleveland's Best Sporting Goods Store," citing "...Mom-and-pop shops like Geiger's are what make neighborhoods and communities unique...."

=== Skiing, snowboarding and winter sports ===
Don Geiger, Charley Jr.'s brother, began the Geiger's ski department in 1961, as skiing in the United States was becoming popular. Geiger's was a pioneer in the ski outfitting business, one of about 150 establishments nationwide that have been recognized as the ones who "got things started." Of the three pioneer shops in Ohio, two survive: Geiger's Lakewood and Geiger's Chagrin Falls.

As interest in snow sports increased, Geiger's added items like alpine and Nordic skis and ski boots, snowboards and boots, ski and snowboard accessories, and a significant number of brands in men's, women's and children's cold weather clothing and accessories.

The company has sponsored many ski-oriented programs and outings throughout its history in the ski industry. Geiger's supported former US National Ski champion Jeannie Thoren in her campaign for "female-friendly" ski equipment. Thoren's position was that women's physical characteristics are completely different from those of men, so just shorter skis will not suffice. Thoren has made many appearances in Geiger's ski stores, urging women to demand and ski manufacturers to design better equipment.

Geiger's has been active in America's Best Bootfitters, a worldwide association of independent ski and snowboard retailers that offers certification in the science of fitting ski and snowboard boots. These boots are integral to good, safe skiing.

Executive Vice President and Co-owner Gordon Geiger is active in snow sports. He is Vice Chairman and has served as Treasurer of the board of directors of Snow Specialists Limited (SSL) one of the leading specialty retail buying associations for ski and snowboarding in the US. The group, founded in 1971, includes more than 60 organizational members who operate over 120 retail outlets in 27 states. His wife Susan has served on the association's Softgoods Committee since 2010.

In 2015, Gordon was elected a director of the National Ski and Snowboard Retailers Association (NSSRA). Founded in 1987, NSSRA acts as an advocate on issues like pricing policies, vendor-retailer relationships and provides information that helps its members operate more efficiently and effectively.

== Historic buildings ==
Charley Geiger Sr. founded the company in 1932 about three storefronts west of the site of the current Lakewood store and corporate headquarters. In 1936, he leased the present store at 14710 Detroit Ave. (which he ultimately purchased) and moved all his goods and store fixtures east. Subsequently, in 1962 the company expanded and purchased an adjacent building to its west. By 1973, Geiger's had knocked down the interior walls and presented the store as one internally connected building.

The exterior, however, remained disconnected. In 1975, the company erected a 100-foot (30.48 m) white aluminum façade to make it appear that the two buildings were actually one. The aluminum wall lasted over 25 years, until, early in the 21st century, Geiger's decided to return to the early 1900s core of the buildings. As they dismantled the old sheet wall, architectural details nearly 100 years old were revealed and emphasized. Architect Rex Gilliland commented that he had simply "…put it back to what it was".

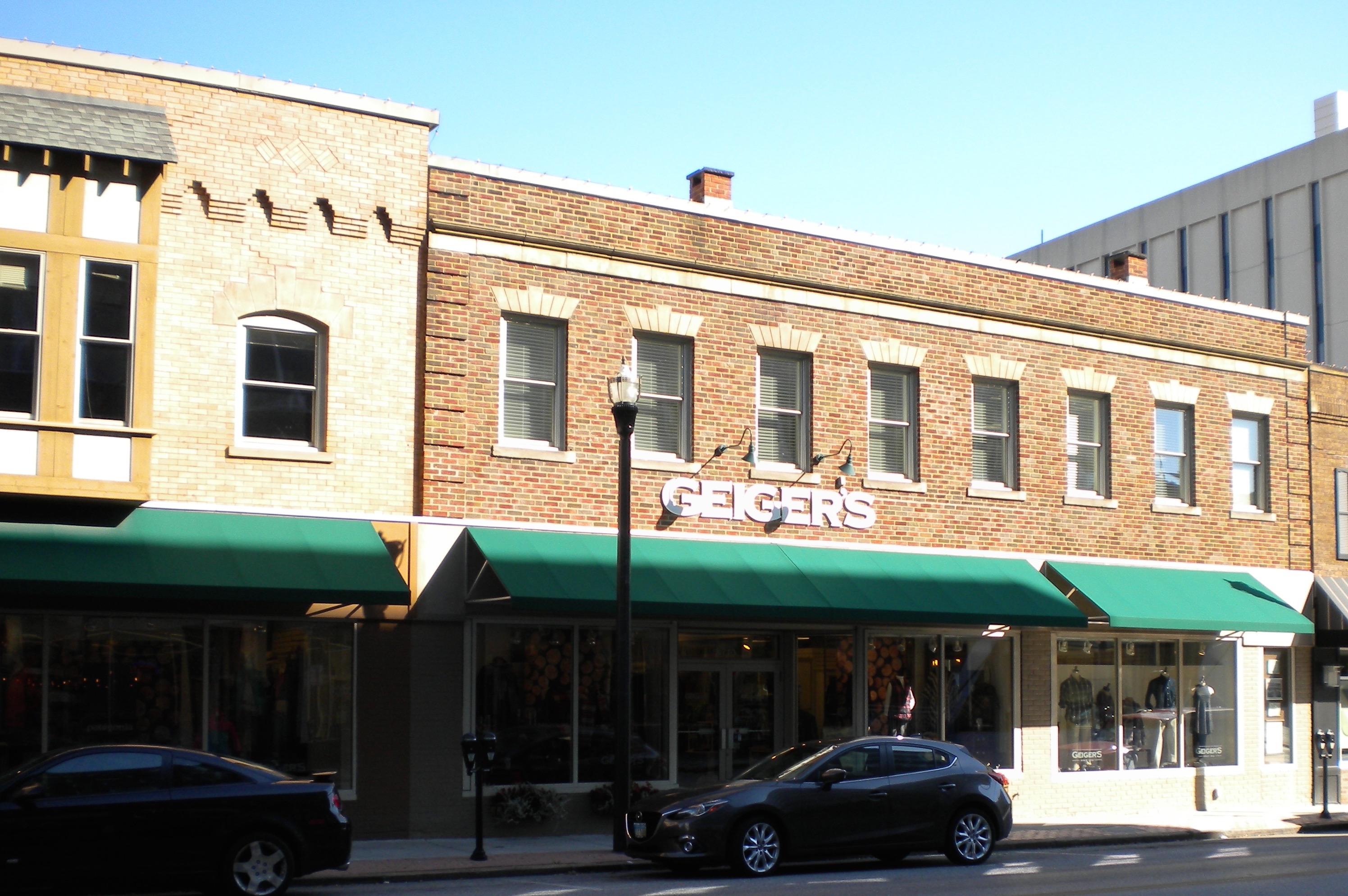
Geiger's headquarters and main store

Geiger's was lauded for its renovation; the city of Lakewood's Jeff Rink stated, we "…are excited to have such a fantastic corporate citizen…what they've done is a model for Lakewood to preserve the heritage of historic buildings…." In 2002, Geiger's received an Award from the Cleveland Restoration Society and AIA Cleveland for its Lakewood location historic storefront preservation.

== Children's clothing ==
In 1961, Geiger's purchased Jack 'n Jill, described as "Ohio's largest exclusive children's shop," from its founder, Theodore F. Brooks. The Lakewood unit was the only surviving store of a chain of five that Brooks had developed over 25 years. Jack 'n Jill offered a complete line of infants' and children's wear, toys and gifts and a layette department for newborns, managed by a registered nurse. The store, at 15015 Detroit Avenue in Lakewood, featured sleek laminate counters and "modernistic" fixtures. The Jack and Jill location later closed and a children's department was established in the 14710 Detroit store.

== Fashion ==
Geiger's has been in the business of fashion for over 80 years, but "fashion" was not a word used in men's clothing in the 1930s. When Charley Geiger Sr. moved to the store's current location in 1936, it was reported that he had "…a knowledge of what interests Lakewood men and boys – and their wives and girlfriends – in the way of haberdashery."

In 1980, Geiger's expanded again, this time adding a women's department. Featuring skirts, slacks, blazers, blouses and accessories, the department, "Ladies, Ltd.," focused on classic tailoring and clothes.

Geiger's has been providing traditional clothing to its customers, offered with its version of customer service for most of its history. Over the years, as the women's department grew, the company moved into upscale fashion. Geiger's buyers often make purchases with a specific customer in mind.

In the 1980s, Geiger's opened a Pendleton Shop in an old home in Rocky River, Ohio. As a part of their contract with Pendleton, Geiger's was required to stock 75% of the merchandise with Pendleton brand clothing and accessories. In 1996, the store moved to larger quarters in the Old River Shopping area, also in Rocky River. Demand grew at such a pace that a second Geiger's Pendleton Shopped was opened in Medina, Ohio on the historic Medina Town Square. In 2005 the Medina store closed and the Pendleton name and affiliation were dropped in Rocky River, although the store still carried some Pendleton brand items, particularly its iconic women's blazers. The store focused mostly on women's traditional clothing. The response was enthusiastic and the store expanded. A unique aspect of the store was its in-house women's tailor, whose expertise in alterations made certain of exact fits. When the Rocky River location finally closed, fashion ladieswear again became a part of Geiger's Lakewood and Chagrin Falls locations.

== Downtown store ==
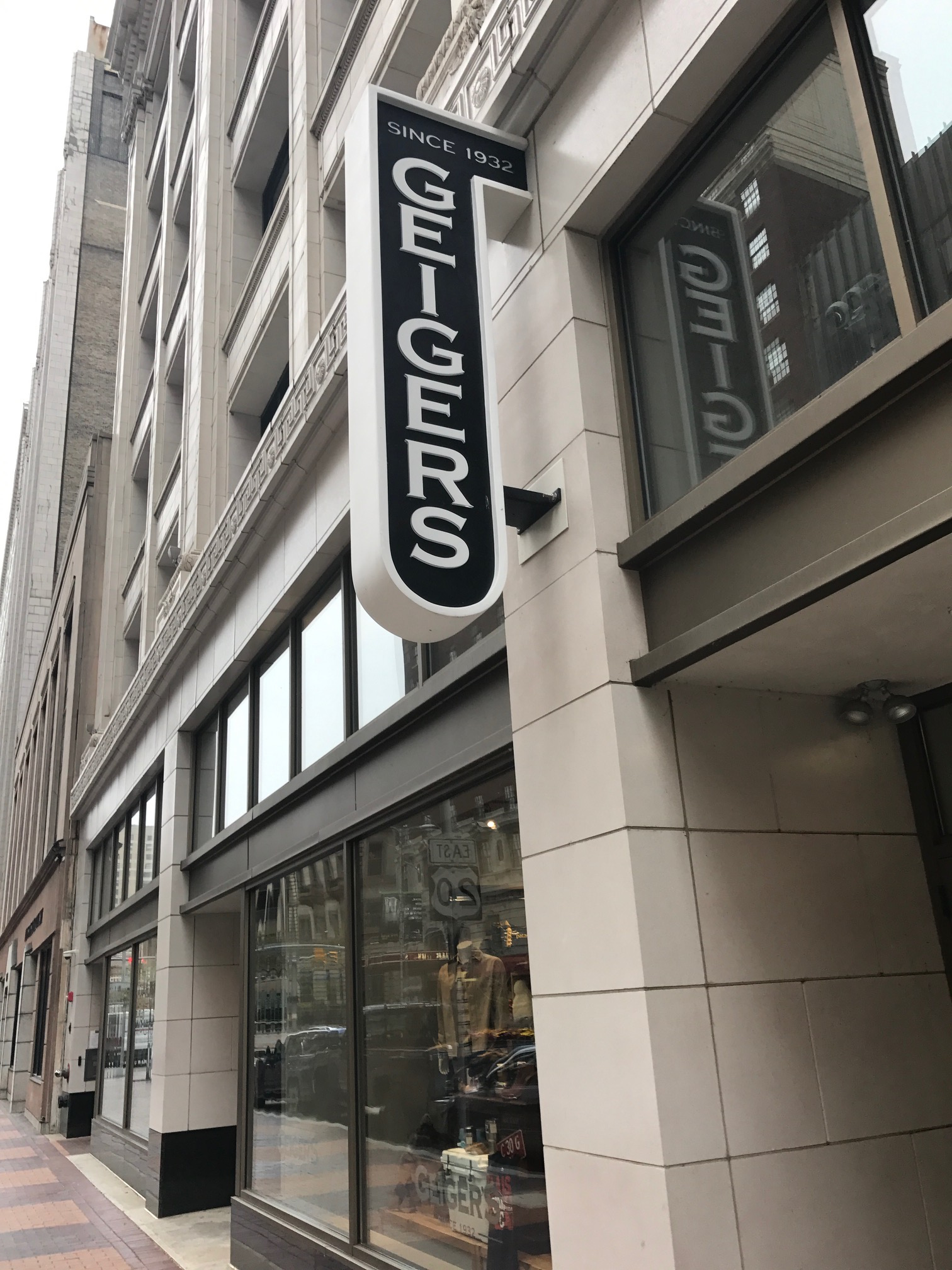
Geiger's Downtown Cleveland 2016

In May, 2015, Geiger's announced that it would return to its roots, and open a new store in downtown Cleveland, next to a recently opened Heinen's upscale supermarket. Geiger's return would be their first downtown unit since the original Geiger's chain closed in 1929. The store, which opened in November 2015, is in a renovated commercial/residential building at 1020 Euclid Ave. near the corner of 9th and Euclid. Originally the Truman Building, it was renamed The Ivory by its current owners.

Constructed in 1911, the Truman Building was designed by renowned architect Willard Hirsch. It is one of eight Hirsch structures that still stand in Cleveland. At the time of construction, this building was built with the most concrete of any building in the country. The building once housed the Oppenheimer & Collins Co. women's clothing manufacturer.

In May 2020, after a peaceful demonstration in response to the George Floyd killing, violent rioters vandalized Geiger's downtown store, stealing hundreds of thousands of dollars' worth of outdoor gear, shoes and clothing. The store's windows were smashed and most of its contents, including décor, were taken. There was serious damage to many of the establishments on Euclid Avenue, although the PlayhouseSquare theaters were unharmed.

In February 2021, the Geiger family announced they were closing their downtown store, due to a combination of the loss of daily traffic following to the COVID-19 pandemic, and, to a lesser extent, because of the damage caused during the May 2020 riots.
