= Sarah Morton (playwright) =

American dramatist

Sarah Morton is an American playwright, actor, educator and activist and a native of Cleveland, Ohio.

== Selected works ==
- (2009) "Dream/Home" premiered at the Cleveland Play House, produced by Dobama Theater
- (2006) "Night Bloomers" premiered at the Cleveland Play House, produced by Dobama Theater
- (2004) "4 Minutes to Happy" solo performance, premiered at Cleveland Public Theater, presented at the New York International Fringe Festival
- (2001) "Safety" premiered at Dobama Theater
- (1999) "Thrillsville" premiered at the Cleveland Play House Next Stage Festival
- (1998) "Eight Impressions of a Lunatic" premiered at Dobama Theater
- (1998) "The Eighth Wonder of the World" solo performance, premiered at Dobama Theater
- (1998) "Love In Pieces" premiered at Cleveland Public Theater
- (1996) "Fever Dream: Episode Three" premiered at Dobama Theater

== Awards ==
- Northern Ohio Live Theatre Achievement Award (Nomination); "4 Minutes to Happy" 2005
- Northern Ohio Live Writing Achievement Award (Nomination); "The Eighth Wonder of the World", "Eight Impressions of a Lunatic", 1999
- Cleveland Scene Keefer Award: Best Solo Performance; "The Eighth Wonder of the World", 1998
- Chilcote Award: Cleveland Public Theatre; "Love In Pieces", 1997
