= Guerrilla Theater Company =

Guerrilla Theater Company (GTC) was an underground theater company based in the Tremont neighborhood of Cleveland, Ohio. Founded in August 1992. Over the course of two years, this company of actors and writers in their mid-twenties produced two original series of hour-long, late night productions featuring short, satiric plays which they called “hits”.

== Productions ==
=== You Have the Right to Remain Silent! ===
The company opened their debut production, You Have the Right to Remain Silent! on Friday, October 23, 1992, at 11 PM, with performances continuing every Friday and Saturday night at the Professor Street Theater, 2275 Professor Street. The performance consisted of twenty-one short plays (“hits”) written and directed by the company, commonly addressing social or political issues. The framing device was that of a live TV game show, featuring interstitial games and prizes with a large “wheel of misfortune.”

=== Mind Your Own Business ===
Their second original production, Mind Your Own Business opened on Friday, November 19, 1993, at The Actors’ Gym (an actual former boxing gym) at 2393 Professor Street in Tremont. For this second iteration, the company performed at 8 PM and 11 PM every Friday and Saturday night. Billed as “Cleveland’s own jumbo-sized board game” the audience was seated on three sides of a large game board.

=== Productions of Shakespeare ===
GTC also produced two plays by William Shakespeare, The Taming of the Shrew, directed by Rich Weiss (1993) and Romeo and Juliet, directed by David Hansen (1994). Romeo and Juliet would be their final production, the company disbanding due to lack of funding.

=== The Guerrilla Theater Radio Hour ===
In 1994, GTC held a thirty-minute timeslot on WRUW 91.1 FM on the campus Case Western Reserve University, presenting The Guerrilla Theater Radio Hour which was recorded in a studio in the shower of The Actors’ Gym.

== Influences ==
GTC claimed inspiration from the Blue Man Group, Saturday Night Live, and Chicago's Neo-Futurists. The company claimed they had been in touch with the Neo-Futurists before proceeding and their response was “encouraging.”

== Publicity Stunts ==
The company was notable for staging unannounced "hit-and-run" performances in public spaces and for “ticketing” parked cars with production flyers that appeared from a distance to be actual city of Cleveland parking tickets.

== Criticism and accolades ==
Critical responses to the company's projects were varied, including admiration for their pluck, and also criticism of their class and privilege. Northern Ohio Live observed, “Fighting the status quo in a neighborhood where the actors’ middle-class backgrounds makes them the establishment seems unlikely.”

The Chagrin Valley Times described Mind Your Own Business as “pretty silly, but if you don’t laugh and have a good time here, you won’t have fun anywhere.” Scene Magazine praised their production of Romeo and Juliet, calling it, “a prime example of how less can be more … with a few masks, a lot of T-shirts, a couple of plastic daggers and a lot of integrity arose a very satisfying Romeo and Juliet.”

Guerrilla Theater Company was voted Best Theater Company (1993) by the readers of Scene Magazine.

== Members ==
- Marie Andrusewicz
- Shelley Bishop
- Erin Cameron
- Tracey Gilbert
- David Hansen
- Eric Lee
- David Litz
- Keith Lukianowicz
- Diana Tracy
- Rich Weiss
- Lee T. Wilson
- Betsy Zajko
