= The Dead Guy =

2005 play written by Eric Coble

- Original language: English
- Written by: Eric Coble
- Characters: Gina Yaweth; Eldon Phelps; Dougie; Virgil Phelps; Roberta Phelps; Christy Moline; Security Guard; First Woman; Second Woman; Leon; Sheila; Nancy
- Subject: An ambitious television producer searches for the ultimate reality show star—someone to die on live television
- Genre: Satire
- Setting: Present day; Television recording studio; Various US locations

Premiere
- Date: September 3, 2005
- Place: Curious Theatre Company; Denver, Colorado

The Dead Guy is a 2005 satirical play written by Scottish American playwright Eric Coble. The play, which reflects on United States reality television, premiered at the Curious Theatre Company in Denver, Colorado in September 2005.

== Plot ==
The play opens with Eldon Phelps and Gina Yaweth at a bar in Leadville (pronounced led-vil). Gina convinces Eldon to star in her new reality television show, The Dead Guy.

The premise of the show: Eldon is given a week and a million dollars to spend however he wishes, but there is one catch—at the end of the week, Eldon must commit suicide in a manner determined by millions of online and telephone voters.

He gives gifts to his mother Roberta and brother Virgil, and then proposes to ex-girlfriend Christy Moline, who denies his request, saying, "You think I want to become a widow at twenty-one?"

Angry, he goes to Disneyland, where he picks up prostitutes, gets drunk, and is finally kicked out of the park. He then realizes that the nation's voters want him to die by chainsaw accident. Fearing this, he tries to find a charity to take his money.

However, no charities want his blood money. He tries to volunteer at a children's hospital, but creates more problems than he solves. His voters soon begin to cut him more slack. He remains friends with Christy, and the voters begin to love him as his end date draws nearer. Finally, on the evening of his death, the write-in vote surprises both him and Gina. The voters want Gina to kill him. Gina shoots him dead. The play ends, as Gina promises that the audience will get "more dead guys".

== Characters ==
- Gina Yaweth: A woman with a premise, 30s-40s. The producer of the reality show, The Dead Guy.
- Eldon Phelps: A man with no premises whatsoever, 20s. The star of The Dead Guy and, in fact, the dead guy himself.
- Dougie: A man who watches. The sole cameraman for The Dead Guy.
- Roberta Phelps: Eldon's mother, 40s-50s.
- Virgil Phelps: Eldon's brother, 20s-30s.
- Christy Moline: Eldon's ex-girlfriend, 20s.
- Two Women: Girls who know how to have a good time (called "Disney Princesses" in the play.)
- Security Guard: A man who knows how to kill a good time. A Disneyland security guard.
- Nancy: A harried pediatric doctor.
- Leon: An impressionable young nurse and born-again Christian.

== Production ==
The original production of the play opened at the Curious Theatre Company in Denver, Colorado, in September 2005. The play starred Elizabeth Rainer as Gina; Todd Webster as Eldon; Byron Matsuno as Dougie; Ed Cord as Virgil, the Security Guard, and Leon; Dee Covington as Roberta, the First Woman, and Sheila; and Jessica Austgen as Christy, the Second Woman, and Nancy.

The play also premiered in Frankfurt, Germany in June 2010.

== Style ==
The action in the play is a mixture of on-stage acting, previously recorded segments, special effects, and live filming. The single set is made to look like a recording studio. The cameraman, Dougie, stands onstage and films most of the show, hooked up to a monitor that then displays his shots.

The play can be divided up into French scenes, or smaller scenes, where the camera angles differ or the scene switches from live acting to previously taped footage. The previous footage is usually used in cut-to-interview format. The play is very comedic until the end, where soberness and tension with the death of the main character change the entire experience.

== Reception ==
Bob Bows of Variety stated, "Coble delivers his coup de grace, leaving no doubt about the price we pay for serving the wrong master." The Houston Press called the play a "must-see", stating, "Amoral, mercenary and totally devoid of good taste, it's not such a far-fetched idea."
