= Curious Theatre Company =

Curious Theatre Company hold membership in the National New Play Network.

== History ==
The company was established in 1997. Curious has had the same Artistic Director, Chip Walton, since their founding. Chip and Dee Covington (Education Director) are both still with Curious after founding the company with others in 1997. In 2010, Curious Theatre Company was awarded the American Theatre Wing's National Theatre Company Grant.

== Productions ==
- Season 1: Burn This
- Season 2: How I Learned to Drive, Full Gallop, Praying for Rain
- Season 3: Art, Closer, Fences
- Season 4: Coyote on a Fence, Fuddy Meers, Cloud Tectonics
- Season 5: An Almost Holy Picture, The Mineola Twins, The Rest of the Night, Proof
- Season 6: Nickel and Dimed, Bright Ideas, Inventing Van Gogh, Yellowman)
- Season 7: Trumbo: Red, White & Blacklisted, The Long Christmas Ride Home, The Goat, or Who Is Sylvia?, The Speer Project or Paris on the Platte and Take Me Out
- Season 8: The Dead Guy, Bug, Frozen, The War Anthology, fiction
- Season 9: I Am My Own Wife, Tempodyssey, Aphrodisiac, A House With No Walls, Mall-Mart: The Musical!
- Season 10: How I Learned To Drive, For Better, Heather Raffo's: 9 Parts of Desire, The Lieutenant of Inishmore, The Denver Project, End Days
- Season 11: Curse of the Starving Class, Speech & Debate, Rabbit Hole, Eurydice, 26 Miles
- Season 12: Yankee Tavern, Ameriville, Home By Dark, Opus, Up
- Season 13: Dead Man's Cell Phone, Astronomical Sunset, Circle Mirror Transformation, Homebody/Kabul, A Number
- Season 14: 9 Circles, Becky Shaw, Red, Collapse, Clybourne Park
- Season 15: The Elaborate Entrance of Chad Deity (co-produced with TheatreWorks Colorado Springs), Time Stands Still, Maple and Vine, The Brothers Size, God of Carnage
- Season 16: After the Revolution, Rancho Mirage, The Whipping Man, Good People, Venus in Fur
- Season 17: All the Rage/The Tricky Part, Lucky Me, Charles Ives Take Me Home, In the Red and Brown Water, Detroit, The Brothers Size (return engagement)
- Season 18: White Guy On The Bus, Dust, Elliott a Soldier's Fugue, Sex With Strangers, Marcus, The Flick
- Season 19: The Luckiest People, Building The Wall, Constellations, The Happiest Song Plays Last, Hand To God, Water By The Spoonful
- Season 20: Your Best One, The Intelligent Homosexual's Guide To Capitalism And Socialism With A Key To The Scriptures, Detroit '67, The Body Of An American, Appropriate
- Season 21: Sanctions, Skeleton Crew, Gloria, The Humans, The Cake
