= Detroit–Shoreway =

Neighborhood of Cleveland, Ohio, United States

- Neighborhood of Cleveland
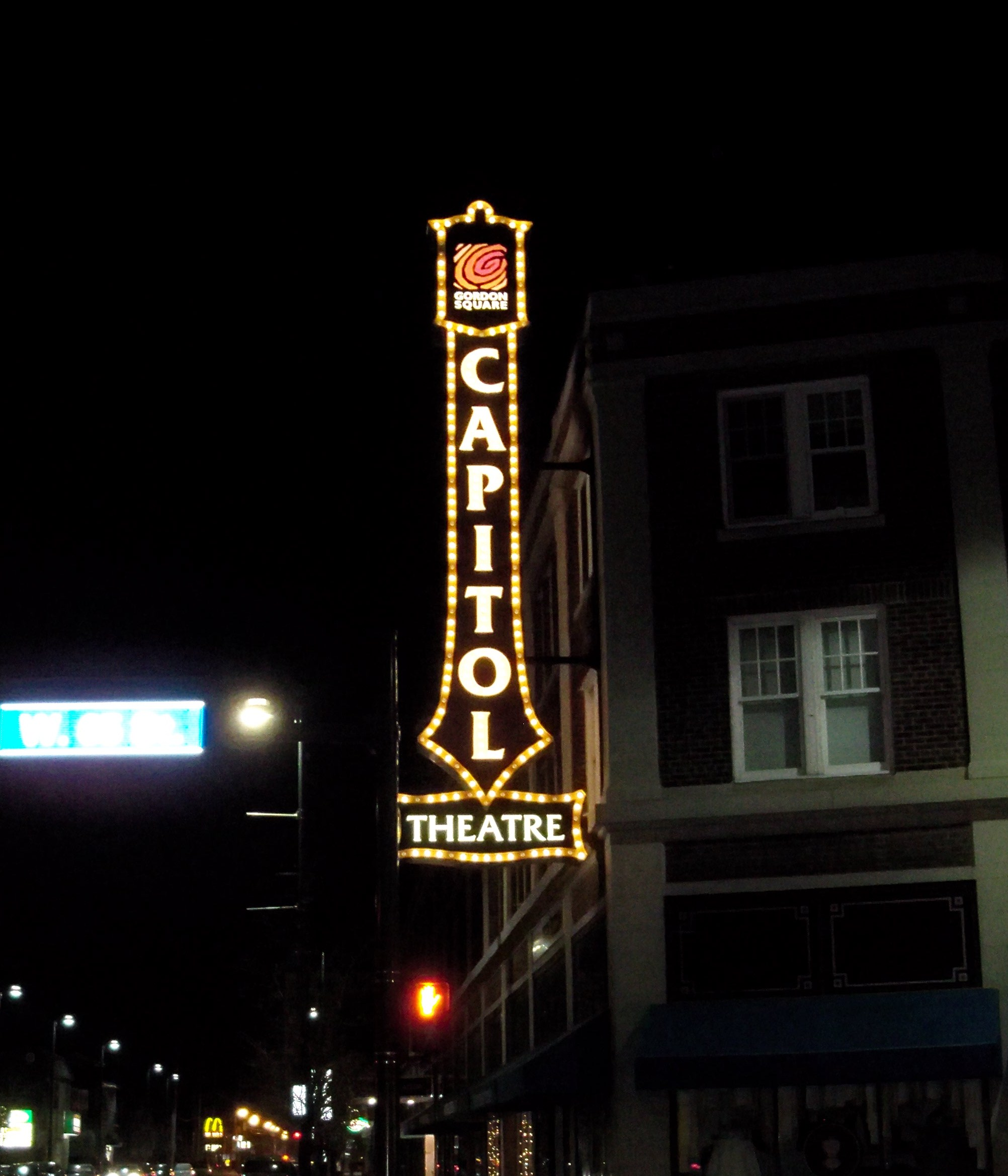

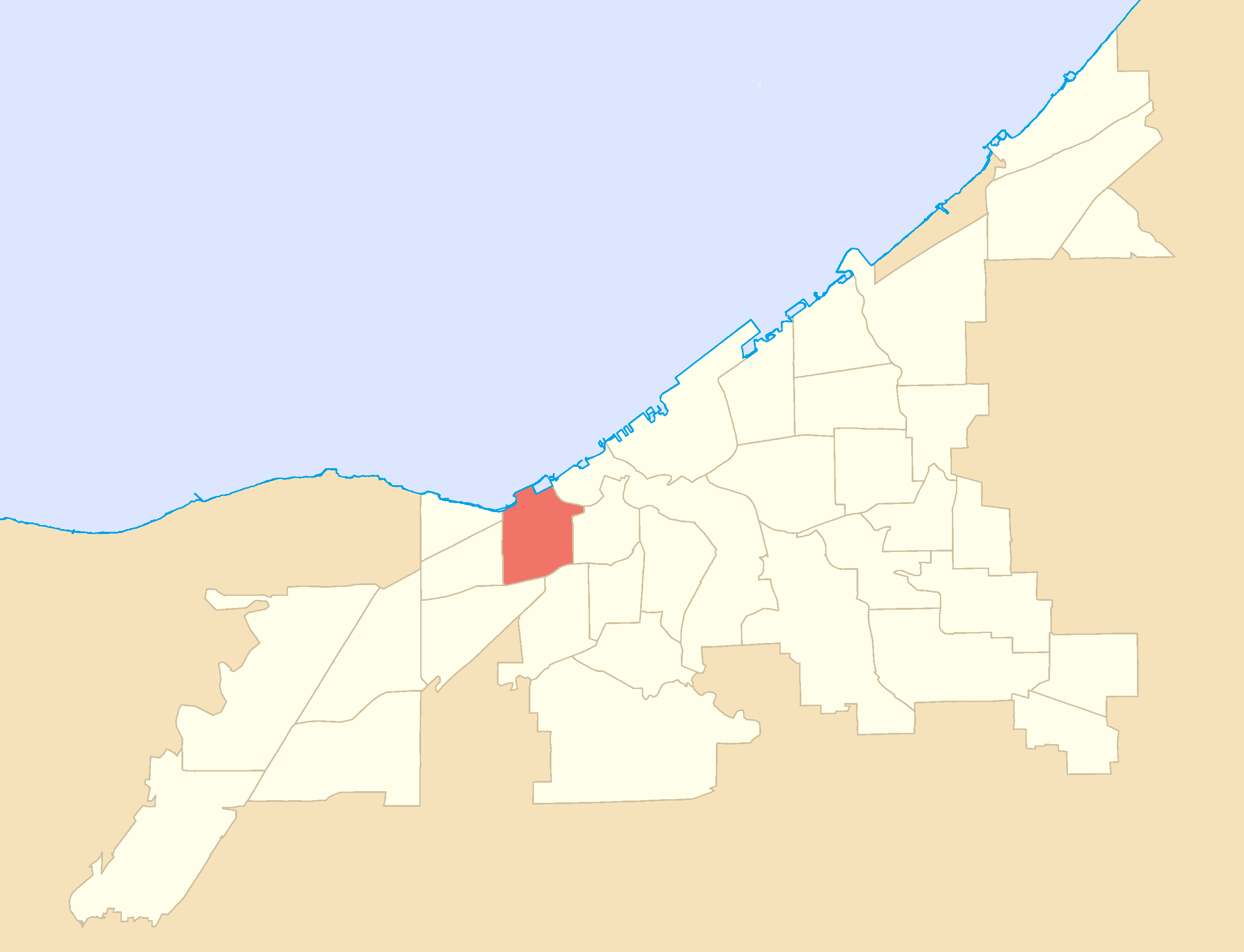
- Coordinates: 41°28′45″N 81°44′16″W
- Country: United States
- State: Ohio
- County: Cuyahoga County
- City: Cleveland

Population (2020)
  - Total: 11,221

Demographics
  - White: 63.7%
  - Black: 22.8%
  - Hispanic (of any race): 25.8%
  - Asian and Pacific Islander: 0.4%
  - Mixed and Other: 13.1%
- Time zone: UTC-5 (EST)
  - Summer (DST): UTC-4 (EDT)
- ZIP Codes: 44102
- Area code: 216
- Median income: $33,139
- Source: 2020 U.S. Census, City Planning Commission of Cleveland

Detroit–Shoreway is a neighborhood on the West Side of Cleveland, in the U.S. state of Ohio. Detroit–Shoreway consists of the streets between Lake Erie and Interstate 90, from West 85th to West 45th streets.

== Gordon Square ==
The retail hub of Detroit–Shoreway is Gordon Square, a series of retail buildings on the four corners of Detroit Avenue and West 65th Street. Named for W.J. Gordon, considered a "city father", Gordon Square is currently the central focus of efforts to remake Detroit–Shoreway into a cultural and artistic hub for the west side, including the renovation and re-opening of the Capitol Theatre, a new building for the Near West Theatre, and renovations to the Cleveland Public Theater complex, as well as a complete rebuild of the Detroit Avenue streetscape from West 58th to West 73rd streets, including burying of utility lines. Reinberger Auditorium houses the Talespinner Children's Theatre, a professional theater made for child audiences. Additional plans include rebuilding the Lorain Avenue Streetscape within the Lorain Avenue Antiques District, from West 52nd to West 82nd. oWOW Radio is located at the 78th Street Studios in Gordon Square.

== New developments ==
Detroit–Shoreway is serviced by various bus routes, and includes its own rapid transit station, West 65th–Lorain. The Greater Cleveland Regional Transit Authority, in conjunction with the City of Cleveland and the Cleveland EcoVillage, is working on plans for transit-oriented development in the area around the station, and Detroit–Shoreway is additionally the site of a brownfield redevelopment of an old Eveready Battery Plant, known as Battery Park. The city is working with the Ohio Department of Transportation on plans to rebuild the limited access West Shoreway (SR-2) as a low-speed, 35 mph boulevard, reconnecting the long-split neighborhood with access to the lake.

== Neighborhood gallery ==
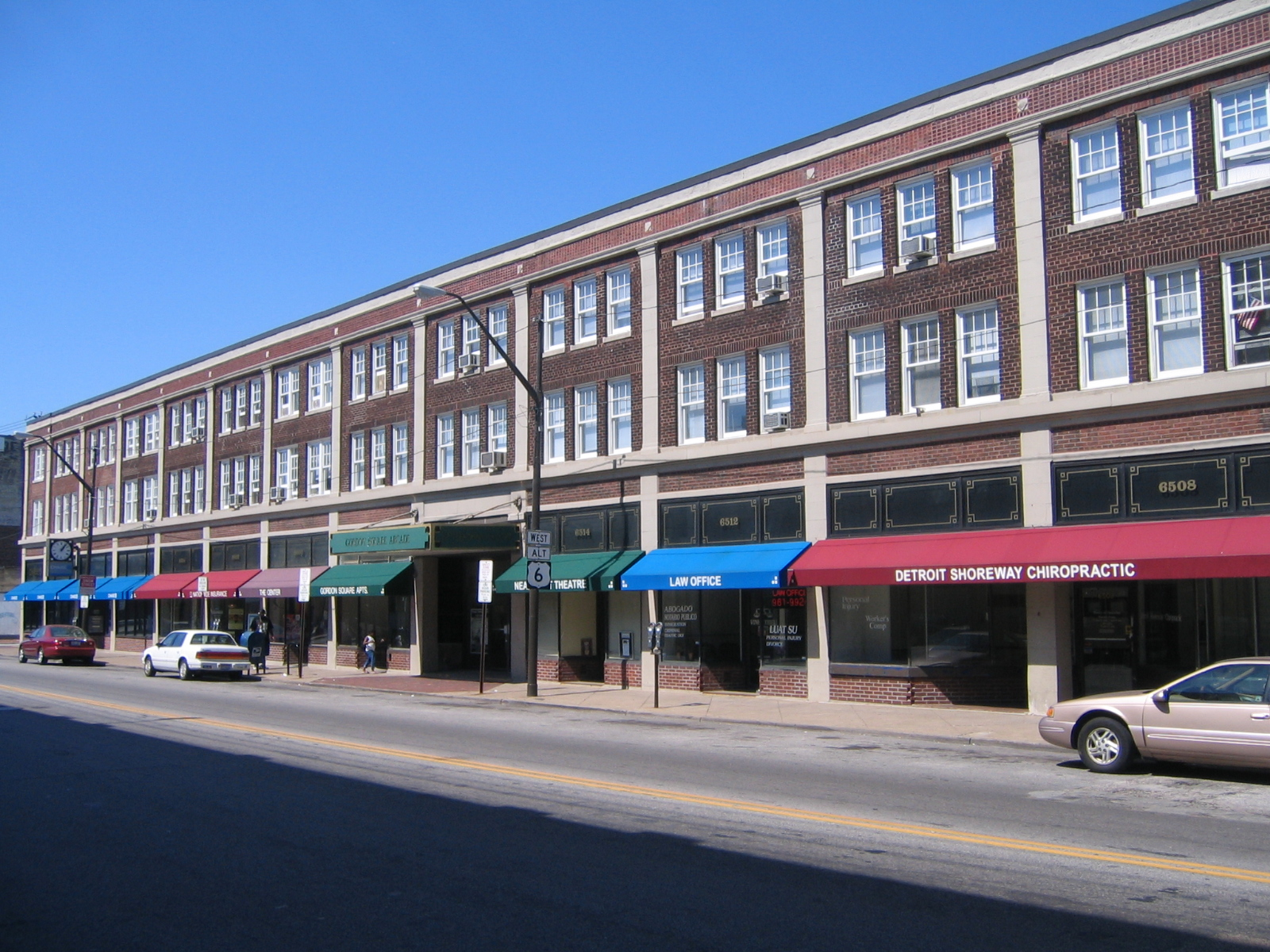
Gordon Square, Detroit–Shoreway's retail hub and slated to become an arts area in the near future.

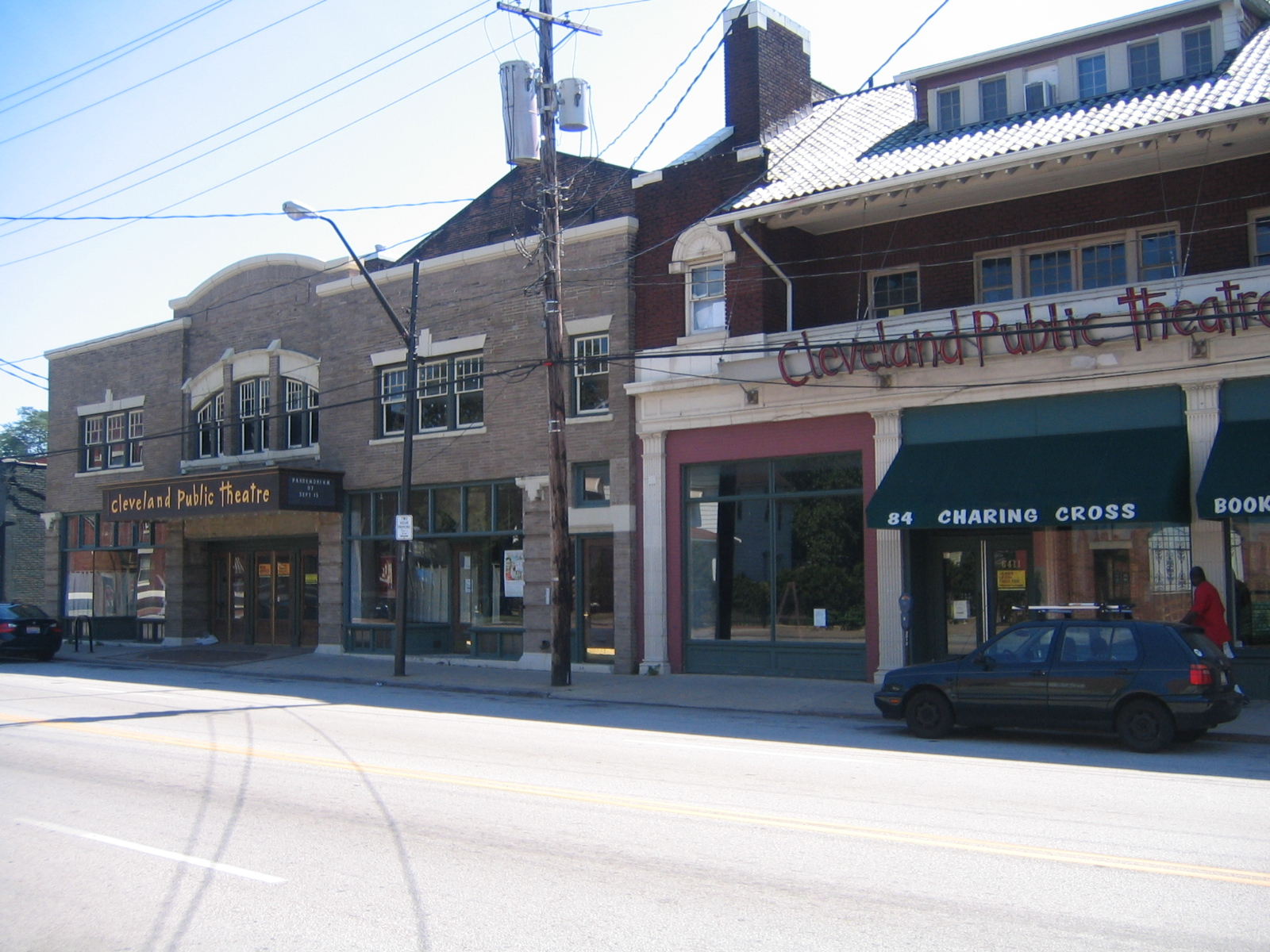
Cleveland Public Theater, near the intersection of W.65th and Detroit Ave.

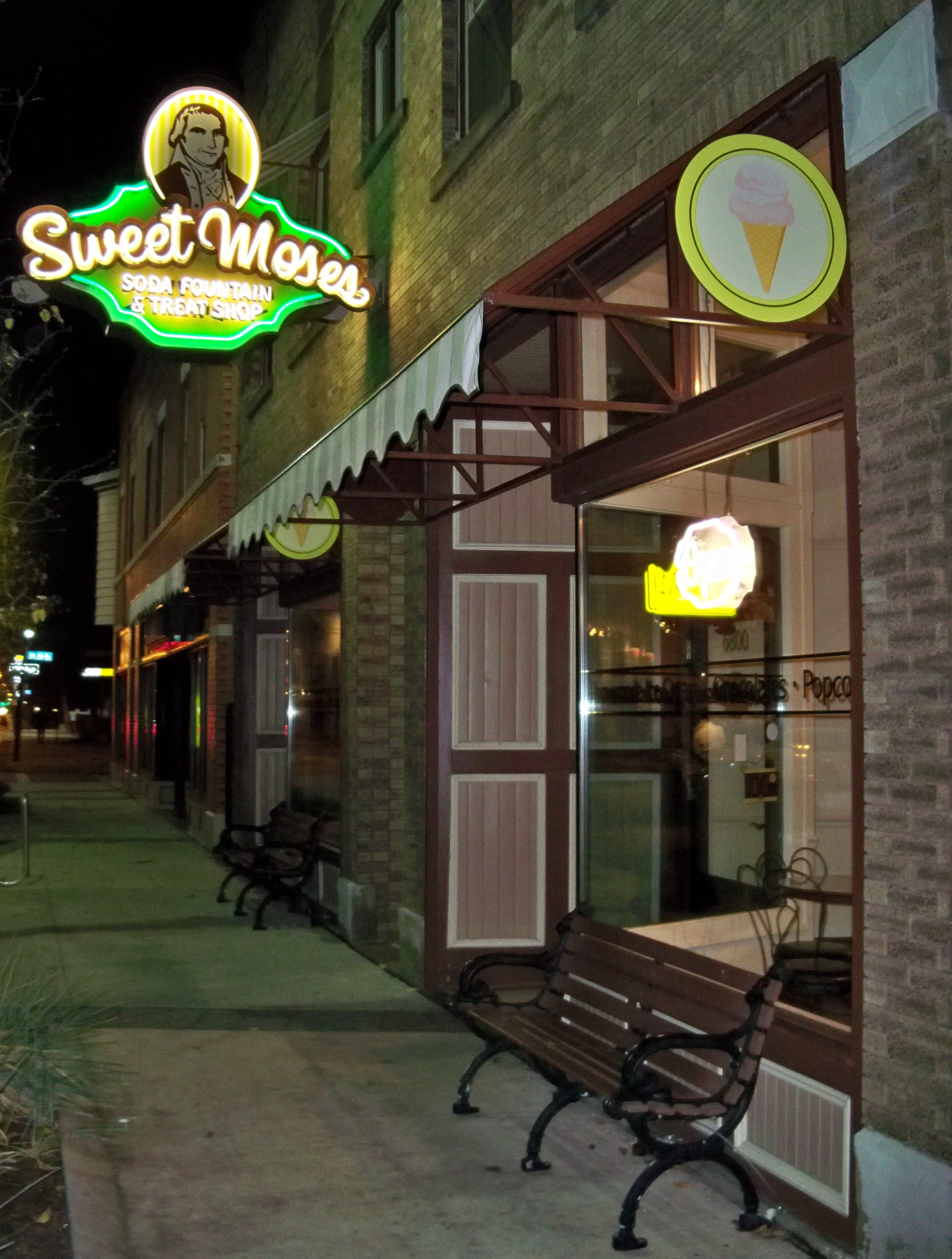
Sweet Moses Soda Fountain & Treat Shop (named for Moses Cleaveland in the Gordon Square Arts District.

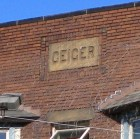
Original Geiger's Facade in Detroit Shoreway c. 1918

== Points of Interest ==
- Alternative Press Magazine (W.80th north of Lake Road)
- Capitol Theatre of the Near West Theatre (W.65th and Detroit Ave)
- Cleveland Public Theater (W.64th and Detroit Ave)
- Reinberger Auditorium houses the Talespinner Children's Theatre (W.52nd and Detroit)
