= Société typographique de Neuchâtel =

Former Swiss publisher

The Société typographique de Neuchâtel was a Swiss publishing house and bookseller that operated between 1769–1794. Their archives, consisting of around 25,000 letters and various types of account books held in the Bibliothèque publique et universitaire de Neuchâtel, are an unparalleled source for the study of the eighteenth-century European book trade. The STN published over 220 works, over 500 volumes in total, the majority of which were counterfeit editions. Clients included Jacques Garrigan; Perisse Frères; Rigaud, Pons & Compagnie; and Luke White.

== Sources ==
Simon Burrows, The French Book Trade in Enlightenment Europe II: Enlightenment Bestsellers (Bloomsbury, 2018)
Mark Curran, The French Book Trade in Enlightenment Europe I: Selling Enlightenment (Bloomsbury, 2018)
Robert Darnton, The Forbidden Best-Sellers of Prerevolutionary France (1995)
Robert Darnton & Michel Schlup (eds),Le Rayonnement d'une maison d'édition dans l'Europe des Lumières: la Société typographique de Neuchâtel, 1769-1789 (2005)
Michel Schlup (ed.), La Société typographique de Neuchâtel, l’édition neuchâteloise au siècle des Lumières, 1769-1789 (2002).
