= Oregon Children's Theatre =

American children's theater

- Logo
- Abbreviation: OCT
- Formation: 1988; 38 years ago
- Founder: Sondra Pearlman

Oregon Children's Theatre (OCT) is a children's theatre organization based in Portland, Oregon, United States.

== History ==
Originally created by Sondra Pearlman as the "Theatre for Young People" in 1988, OCT became a resident company of the Portland Center for the Performing Arts in 1991.

As part of the COVID-19 pandemic, the theatre received between $150,000 and $350,000 in federally backed small business loan from US Bank as part of the Paycheck Protection Program. The company stated it would allow them to retain 91 jobs.

OCT announced in March 2025 that it was halting all programming effective September 2025. The organization was revived in 2026.
