= Jacques Garrigan =

Jacques Garrigan was a bookseller in Avignon, Papal States, in the 18th century.

== Titles published by Garrigan ==
- Jean Joseph Chassanis (1754), Dissertation sur la maladie epidemique, qui à regné à Lodéve et autres villes du royaume en 1751, Avignon: Chez Jacques Garrigan, Imprimeur-Libraire, Place Saint Didier, OCLC 79752223, OL 24780565M
- Dictionnaire De L'Académie Françoise (Nouv ed.), Avignon: J. Garrigan, 1777
- Molière (1790), Amphitryon, Avignon: J. Garrigan, OL 23276213M

== See also ==
- Books in France
