= Dobama Theatre =

Theater company and theater in Cleveland Heights, Ohio, US

- Formation: 1959; 67 years ago
- Type: Theatre group
- Location(s): 2340 Lee Rd. Cleveland Hts., OH 44118
- Artistic director: Nathan Motta
- Website: www.dobama.org

Dobama Theatre is located in Cleveland Heights, Ohio, United States. It was founded in 1959 by Donald and Marilyn Bianchi, Barry Silverman, and Mark Silverberg. The name Dobama was created from the first two letters of each man's name. The first play produced by Dobama Theatre was The Rope Dancers by Morton Wishengrod.

After almost ten years as a nomadic theater company using various spaces around Cleveland, Dobama established a permanent home on Coventry Road in Cleveland Heights in 1968. From its origin, the artistic director was Donald Bianchi, though his wife Marilyn Bianchi was a strong artistic presence until her death in 1977.

In 1976, one of the founders, Barry Silverman, assumed proprietorship of the Belfry Theater in Wisconsin for a few summer seasons under the name "Dobama West".

From 1991 to the end of 2008, Dobama was managed by artistic director Joyce Casey, who made Dobama a "leading producer of new and recent plays".

In 2005, Dobama was evicted from the Coventry neighborhood, resuming a nomadic existence, and producing shows at various locations, including the Cleveland Play House.

On September 25, 2009, Dobama inaugurated a new, permanent location at the Cleveland Heights Public Library facility, stewarded by the company's third artistic director, Joel Hammer.

The theatre's current artistic director Nathan Motta took over artistic duties on February 15, 2013, having previously directed the Cleveland premiere production of A Bright New Boise at Dobama. Motta was also the founder of the Dobama Emerging Actors Program, a summer training intensive for high school and college theatre students, where he directed productions of Blood Wedding, Antigone, and The Tempest.

Dobama Theatre became Northeast Ohio's third Equity Theatre, and only Equity Small Professional Theatre (SPT) beginning the 2014–15 season. Dobama is now recognized as the region's professional Off-Broadway theatre.

Since its founding, Dobama has been known for producing alternative work that would not otherwise be seen in Cleveland. This ranges from their initial production in 1959 to a staging of The Iceman Cometh by Eugene O'Neill and their many productions of new and Off-Broadway work.

Notable plays that have seen their Cleveland premiere at Dobama Theatre include The Pillowman, The Goat or Who is Sylvia?, The Last Five Years, The Larame Project, Closer, Wit, How I Learned to Drive, All in the Timing, Top Girls, Marvin's Room, Speed the Plow, Cloud Nine, True West, Catch 22, Roots, On the Verge, God of Carnage, 4000 Miles, The Flick, An Octoroon, Hand to God, and the first professional Cleveland production of Angels in America.

== Marilyn Bianchi Kids' Playwriting Festival ==
Dobama Theatre is known for its annual Marilyn Bianchi Kids' Playwriting Festival, open to Cuyahoga County students in grades 1 through 12. Dating back to 1979, it is the oldest children's playwriting festival of its kind in the United States. Each year, the festival receives between four and five hundred plays, of which a small number are chosen for professional production. The winners see their plays performed at the annual festival performance in June.
