= Cleveland Public Theatre =

Theater and arts center in Cleveland, Ohio

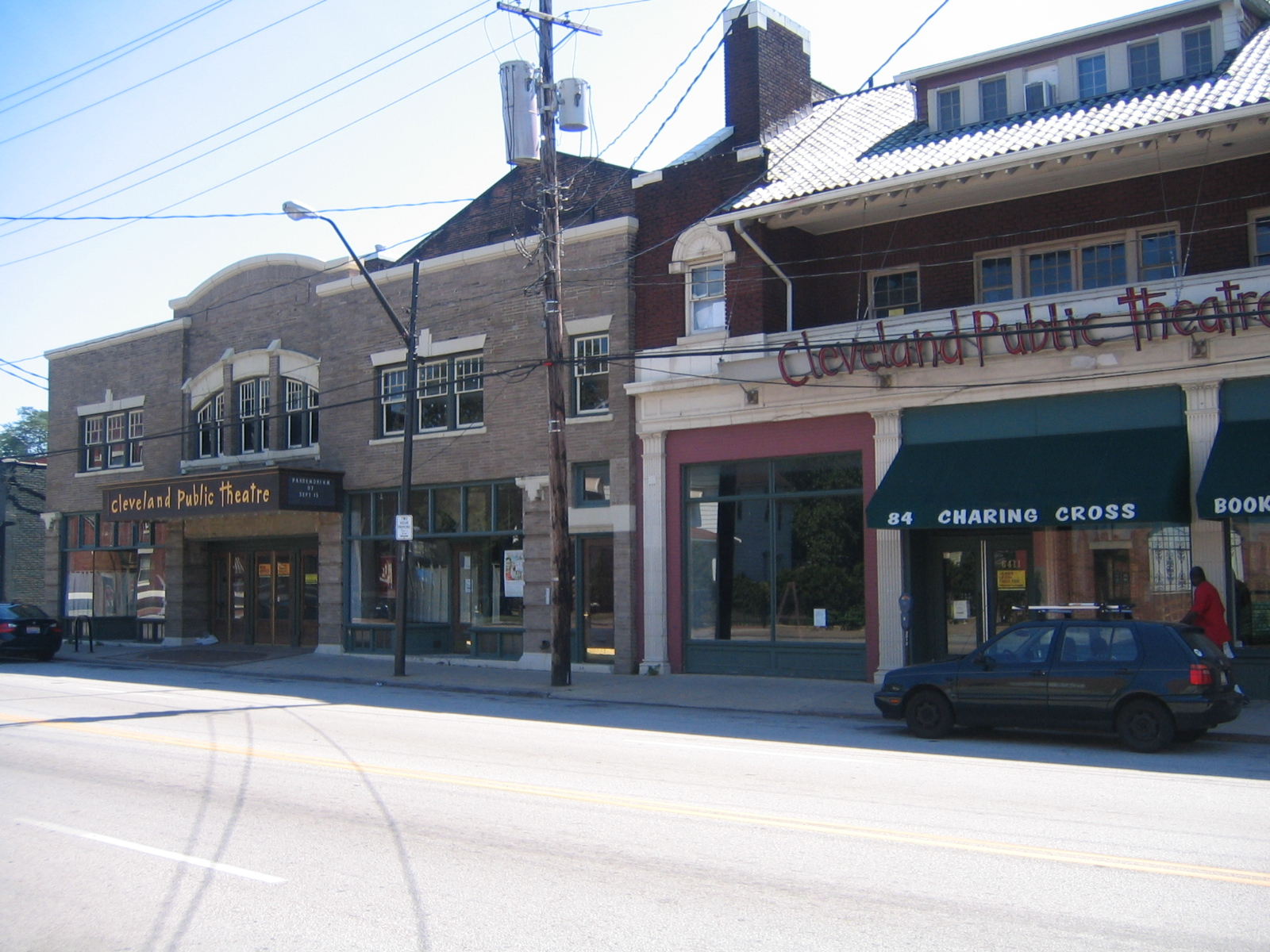
Cleveland Public Theatre

Cleveland Public Theatre is a theater and arts complex in Cleveland, Ohio, founded in 1981 by James Levin. It is located at 6415 Detroit Avenue on Cleveland's west side in the Detroit-Shoreway neighborhood.

Cleveland Public Theatre’s mission is to raise consciousness and nurture compassion through groundbreaking performances and life-changing education programs.

CPT develops new, adventurous work; and nurtures artists from Greater Cleveland and the Akron area — particularly those whose work is inventive, intelligent, and socially conscious. CPT’s acclaimed education programs engage youth and adults in creating new works that speak to contemporary issues, and empower participants to work for positive change in the community.

Each year CPT engages nearly 1,000 youth and adults in programs that enhance academic achievement and teach job skills, compassion, mindfulness, and community pride. Cleveland Act Now (CAN), the Student Theatre Enrichment Program (STEP), and the Y-Haven Theatre Project work with children in public housing, teens, and adults in recovery to create original productions that are performed in public parks, treatment centers, shelters, prisons, universities, and juvenile detention centers, and attended by 15,000 community members annually.

CPT produces new work by local artists across Greater Cleveland and the Akron area. Through four new play development programs, CPT serves local artists at every step of the creative process, from early ideas all the way to full productions. Between 2015 and 2020, CPT produced more than 26 world premieres, 21 of which were by local artists.

CPT is home to Teatro Público de Cleveland, a local Latino theatre company launched in 2013, and Masrah Cleveland Al-Arabi, an Arabic-language theatre company launched in 2018.

CPT also holds several free community festivals every year. Station Hope, a jubilant community event celebrating Cleveland’s social justice history and exploring contemporary struggles for freedom and equity, is held at St. John’s Episcopal Church, Cleveland’s first authenticated Underground Railroad site. Día de Muertos, presented with Teatro Público de Cleveland and Día de Muertos Ohio, and WINTERTIDE at Gordon Square, presented in collaboration with the Detroit Shoreway Community Development Organization, occur in the Gordon Square Arts District.

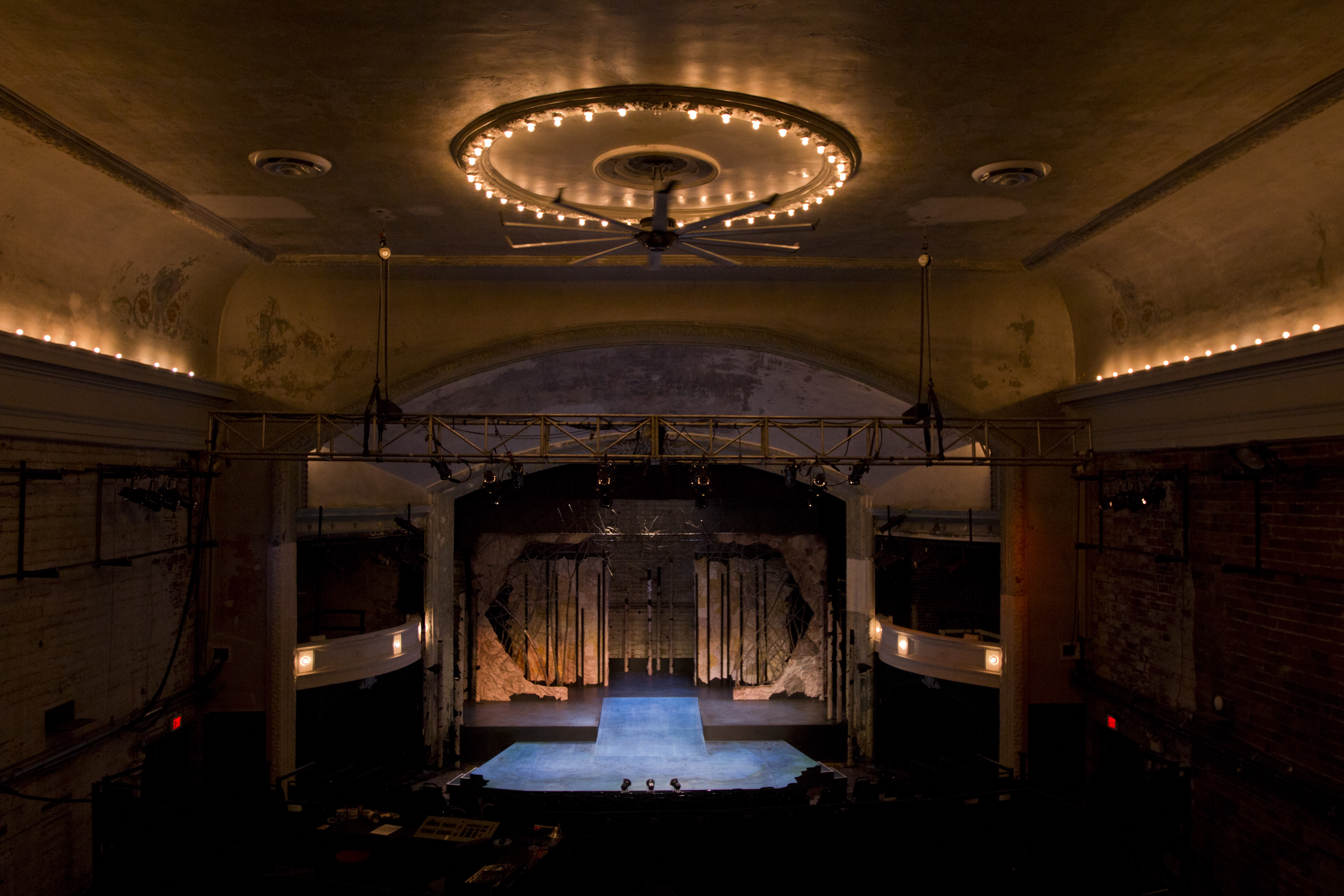

Cleveland Public Theatre is one of the three anchors of the Gordon Square Arts District, which is listed on the National Register of Historic Places. Raymond Bobgan, named in 2009 as one of American Theatre magazine's 25 artists who will shape the future of American theatre, was appointed CPT Executive Artistic Director in 2006.

In 1994, CPT completed its first capital campaign to purchase the building at 6415 Detroit Avenue. CPT transformed the first floor used-appliance store into a small black box theatre and a scene shop. The third floor, once an apartment, became the theatre’s administrative offices. In 1995, CPT acquired the adjoining building which housed the remains of Cleveland’s oldest standing theatre. The Gordon Square Theatre was built in 1911 as a vaudeville theatre, and had been condemned by the city. Now the Gordon Square Theatre is an integral part of the CPT Campus and the Gordon Square Arts District. In December 2009, CPT completed purchase of the de-sanctified Orthodox Church properties adjacent to the theatre buildings.
