= UrbanTheater Company =

American theatre group in Chicago, Illinois

UrbanTheater Company (UTC) was founded in the Chicago neighborhood of Humboldt Park in 2005. The Humboldt Park and Puerto Rican communities are at the core of all of UrbanTheater Company's work, as evidenced by a variety of outreach measures to engage with the surrounding neighborhood. Their mission statement reads: "UTC is committed to the creation and exploration of urban-inspired works that convey, illuminate and empathize with the human experience".

== History ==
In 2005, founders Marilyn Camacho, Madrid St. Angelo, and Ivan Vega established UrbanTheater Company. All of them actors and theater artists themselves, the founders saw the lack of Latinx representation onstage firsthand and founded UTC as a means to bring these stories to a main-stage audience. Actress and writer Marilyn Camacho was initially motivated to create UrbanTheater Company as "a place to play and create with other artists that felt like they also didn't have a home". After an initial partnership to create UTC fell through, Marilyn Camacho connected with Ivan Vega who, upon signing onto the collaboration, introduced her to Madrid St. Angelo. As UrbanTheater Company has grown, the founders have served as directors, actors, administrators, and advocates.

Originally conceived in the Chicago neighborhood of Bucktown, UrbanTheater Company soon moved to their current location at Batey Urbano in Humboldt Park. Batey Urbano is a cultural and arts center that also doubles to provide youth programming through the Puerto Rican Cultural Center (PRCC). UrbanTheater Company has subsequently established close partnerships with the PRCC and its Executive Director José López; the company has made it a part of its mission to connect with this youth and the Puerto Rican community at large in Humboldt Park.

At Batey Urbano, UrbanTheater Company premiered their first show, Short Eyes by Puerto Rican playwright Miguel Piñero. After a successful production, UTC dedicated their entire first season to bringing Miguel Piñero's plays to the Chicago stage and presented the Midwest premieres of The Sun Always Shines for the Cool and Eulogy for a Small Time Thief. Since then, the vast majority of UTC's productions have been works authored by Puerto Rican playwrights, and all other plays were written by other under-represented playwrights of color. From 2011–2013, UrbanTheater Company briefly presented its seasons away from their Humboldt Park home, with its productions of Sonnets for an Old Century at Steppenwolf's Garage Theater, Beauty of the Father the Wicker Park Arts Center, and Fucking A the Beacon Street Hull House. They returned to Batey Urbano for their eighth season and have since established a concrete presence as a professional theater company in Humboldt Park. UrbanTheater Company uses their plays to engage with both the present status of the Puerto Rican identity and how Puerto Rican history is in conversation with this modern iteration of the culture.

UrbanTheater Company has continued to expand their ensemble and gain critical notoriety throughout Chicago. Its productions have garnered many nominations including nods from the Non-Equity Jeff Awards. UTC has continued to explore partnerships with other theater organizations in the Chicago area: UrbanTheater Company was a part of the Goodman Theater's 2008 and 2010 Latino Festivals and the First Chicago International Latino Festival in 2017 in collaboration with The Chicago Latino Theater Alliance (CLATA) and Victory Gardens.

=== Humboldt Park & The Puerto Rican Community ===
Urban Theater Company is located in Humboldt Park, a largely Puerto Rican North Western suburb of Chicago. At UTC's inception in 2005, Humboldt Park was America's second largest Puerto Rican neighborhood. This vibrant Puerto Rican culture characterizes daily life in Humboldt Park and has inspired a great deal of activism in the area. However, gentrification was slowly beginning before UTC ever opened its doors. New developments and skyrocketing property values have continued, to this day, to displace much of the Latinx community that had lived in Humboldt Park for years. Many residents agree that this influx of non-Latinx residents threatens the Puerto Rican culture that defines life in Humboldt Park today, the very culture UTC seeks to represent onstage.

Urban Theater Company is located at the Batey Urbano on Humboldt Park's historical "Paseo Boricua" where, in 1995, two forty-two ton Puerto Rican flags were raised to symbolize strength of the Puerto Rican community in Chicago. UrbanTheater Company embraces the historical context of its location by partnering with the community in a variety of ways. Since its establishment, UrbanTheater Company has fostered a relationship with Humboldt Park's Puerto Rican Cultural Center, relying on their support to create a symbiotic relationship between the theater and surrounding community. The Puerto Rican Cultural Center often educates the UTC ensemble about the history and content of their shows while UrbanTheater Company reaches out to the youth center and community in the exploration of the issues, questions, and aspects of culture brought up in their productions. Through UTC's Community Conexión department, ensemble members use the sociopolitical topics of their shows to engage with the surrounding Humboldt Park and Chicago area communities. In September 2017, UTC itself became a site for political action as it housed a meeting for politicians, activists, and leaders in the community to begin planning outreach and aid to Puerto Rico after Hurricanes Irma and Maria.

== Production history ==
Production History
Play	Playwright	Director	Year
Short Eyes	Miguel Piñero	Ron OJ Parson	2005
The Sun Always Shines for the Cool*	Miguel Piñero	Madrid St. Angelo	2006
Eulogy for a Small Time Thief*	Miguel Piñero	Joel Moorman	2006
Runaways*	Elizabeth Swados	Nikkieli DeMone	2007
Broken Thread**	Wysteria Edwards	Nikkieli DeMone	2009
Cuba and His Teddy Bear*	Reinaldo Povod	Marilyn Camacho	2009
Brainpeople	José Rivera	Marti Lyons	2011
Sonnets for an Old Century*	José Rivera	Madird St. Angelo with Juan Castañeda	2011
Beauty of the Father*	Nilo Cruz	Cecilie Keenan	2011
Fucking A	Suzan-Lori Parks	Richard Perez	2012
First Class*	Cándido Tirado	Juan Castañeda	2013
Devil Land*	Desi Moreno-Penson	Hank Hilbert and Juan Castañeda	2014
Julia De Burgos: Child of Water*	Carmen Rivera	Juan Castañeda	2014
Adoration of the Old Woman*	José Rivera	Juan Castañeda	2015
Lolita de Lares	Migdalia Cruz	Marcela Muñoz	2016
La Gringa*	Carmen Rivera	Miranda Gonzalez	2016 (2017: Holyoke, MA)
Water & Power*	Richard Montoya	Richard Perez	2017
Ashes of Light**	Marco Antonio Rodriguez	Miranda Gonzalez	2017

*Mid West premiere

**World premiere
