= Mark Bly =

American dramaturge

- Born: 1949 (age 76–77); Sioux Falls, South Dakota, United States
- Education: University of Minnesota (BA), Boston College (MA), Yale School of Drama (MFA)

Mark Bly (born 1949) is an American dramaturge, educator, and author. After graduating from Yale's Dramaturgy and Dramatic Criticism Program in 1980, Bly worked as a resident dramaturge – then a relatively new position in the United States. He held this position for several of the country's major regional theaters: the Guthrie, Yale Rep, Seattle Rep, Arena Stage, and the Alley. He was the first dramaturge to receive a Broadway dramaturgy credit for his collaboration with director Emily Mann on her play Execution of Justice (1986), During his career, Bly worked as a production dramaturge with a series of major theater artists including Doug Hughes, Garland Wright, Emily Mann and Moisés Kaufman, as well as on the world premieres of works by playwrights Suzan-Lori Parks, Sarah Ruhl and Rajiv Joseph.

In 1992, Bly returned to the Yale School of Drama to teach playwriting and dramaturgy. As a teacher and author, he rejected narrow definitions of the dramaturge's role in the theatre-making process, arguing for dramaturgy as an active, open, and, most of all, deeply-informed application of "The Questioning Spirit" (i.e., commitment to "an environment where everyone is free to ask questions" and "curiosity is at a premium") to the creative process.

In addition to editing and contributing to Yale Theater: American Production Dramaturgs (1986), a collection of interviews with the first generation of American dramaturges, Bly assembled and edited two volumes of his Production Notebooks: Theater in Process (1996, 2001) – the first set of dramaturgy case studies published in North America. Bly's later writings include New Dramaturgies: Strategies and Exercises for 21st Century Playwriting (2019), a book detailing techniques for teaching playwriting created by Bly for his students at Yale.

Bly's production dramaturgy, teaching, and writing have led others to regard him as a major influence in the emergence of dramaturgy as a field and profession in contemporary American theater.

== Life and career ==
Born in Sioux Falls, South Dakota, Bly attended University of Minnesota (BA, 1973), Boston College (MA, 1977), and the Yale School of Drama (MFA, 1980). As a resident dramaturge at the Guthrie Theater from 1981-1989, Bly worked on many productions of classics, including Peer Gynt (1983, directed by Liviu Ciulei); the Gorky-Gershwin musical Hang on to Me (1984, directed by Peter Sellars); The Misanthrope (1987, directed by Garland Wright) and Leon & Lena (and Lenz) (1987, directed by JoAnne Akalaitis).

Following his tenure at the Guthrie, Bly worked on the dramaturgy for several world and American premieres of new plays, including director Dan Sullivan's world premiere of Herb Gardner's Conversations with My Father at Seattle Repertory Theatre (1991) with Liz Diamond, the world premiere of Suzan-Lori Parks's The America Play at Yale Repertory Theatre (1994) and The Public Theater (1994), and, with Molly Smith, the world premiere of Sarah Ruhl's trilogy Passion Play, a Cycle at Arena Stage, Washington, DC (2005). He served as Moisés Kaufman's dramaturge on the East Coast (Arena Stage, 2007) and West Coast (La Jolla Playhouse, 2008) world premieres of Kaufman's Beethoven-inspired 33 Variations, as well as for Kaufman's Broadway production of the same play starring Jane Fonda and Zach Grenier (2009). For the Alley Theater in Houston, he served as director Rebecca Taichman's dramaturge for the world premiere production of Rajiv Joseph's Gruesome Playground Injuries (2009).

In addition to his teaching, Bly chaired the MFA Playwriting Program (1992-2004) at Yale and, from 1992 to 1997, co-chaired its Dramaturgy program. He was the board president for Literary Managers and Dramaturgs of the Americas (LMDA) from 2000 to 2005. With artistic director Gregg Henry, Bly, in 2011, co-founded the international Kennedy Center Dramaturgy Intensive Workshop in conjunction with the National New Play Network playwriting workshop. From 2014 to 2017 he established and funded the LMDA Bly Creative Capacity Grant/Fellowship Awards to support international projects that advanced the practice of dramaturgy in innovative ways across disciplines.

In 2010, Bly received the Literary Managers and Dramaturgs of the Americas' (LMDA) Gotthold Ephraim Lessing Lifetime Achievement Award; in 2019, he was awarded the Kennedy Center American College Theater Festival Medallion for Lifetime Excellence in Dramaturgy.

== Awards and recognition ==
Year	Awards and Recognition
2006	Invited to be curator and moderator for panel discussion, "21st Century Issues in Playwriting" with Nilo Cruz, David Henry Hwang, Charles Randolph-Wright, and Karen Zacarias" at Georgetown University, December 5, 2006.
2010	Guest Keynote Speaker for David Edgar's 2010 Playwriting/Pedagogy International Conference the University of Birmingham. Participants included David Edgar, Jack Bradley (former Literary Manager of The National Theatre), and Maja Zade(Schaubühne Dramaturg) among others.
2010	LMDA Gotthold Ephraim Lessing Lifetime Achievement Award at Banff, Canada.
2019	Kennedy Center American College Theater Festival Medallion for Lifetime Excellence in Dramaturgy.
2023	Investiture, College of Fellows of the American Theatre (est. 1965): Recognizing Distinguished Service to the Profession

== Publications (Selected) ==
Year	Title
1986	"American Production Dramaturgs: An Introduction and Seven interviews," Mark Bly, Special Ed. Yale Theater. 17.3 (1986): 5-50 (Oskar Eustis, Russell Vandenbroucke, Martin Esslin, Anne Cattaneo, Arthur Ballet, Gitta Honegger, Richard Nelson, Mark Bly).
1996	Production Notebooks: Theatre in Process Vol. I. Edited with Introduction by Mark Bly. New York: Theater Communications Group, 1996.
1997	"Bristling with Multiple Possibilities" by Mark Bly. Dramaturgy in American Theater: A Source Book. Edited by Susan Jonas, Geoff Proehl, and Michael Lupu. Ft. Worth: Harcourt Brace, 1997.
2001	Production Notebooks: Theatre in Process, Vol. II. Edited with an introduction by Mark Bly. New York: Theater Communication Group, 2001.
2002	"The Americans: Mark Bly" an Interview by Lynn Thomson. Between the Lines: The Process of Dramaturgy. Toronto: Playwrights Canada Press, 2002.
2009	"Variations on an Obsession: As Moisés Kaufman Grapples with a Musical Mystery, His Dramaturg Ponders the Power of the Idee Fixe" by Mark Bly. American Theatre 26.3 (March 2009): 36-39, 68-70.
2016	"Questioning Spirit"—Dramaturgy in America: Mark Bly in conversation with Katalin Trencsényi." Critical Stages/Scènes critiques: The IATC journal/Revue de l'AICT. December 2015: Issue No 12.
2019	New Dramaturgies: Strategies and Exercises for 21st Century Playwriting by Mark Bly. New York: Routledge/Focus, 2019.
2020	"The Dramaturgical Impulse or How Big Is Your Universe?" by Mark Bly. Diversity, Inclusion, and Representation in Contemporary Dramaturgy. Edited by Philippa Kelly. London: Routledge, 2020.

== Productions (Selected) ==
Year	Production
1979	They Are Dying Out by Peter Handke. Adaptation by Michael Roloff in collaboration with Carl Weber. American Premiere, Directed by Carl Weber, Yale Repertory Theatre; Mark Bly, dramaturg.
1983	Peer Gynt by Henrik Ibsen. Translated by Rolf Fjelde. Directed by Liviu Ciulei, Guthrie Theater; Mark Bly, dramaturg.
1984	Hang On To Me. World Premiere. Book by Maxim Gorky. Songs and lyrics by George and Ira Gershwin. Directed by Peter Sellars, Guthrie Theater; Mark Bly, dramaturg.
1986	Execution of Justice by Emily Mann. Directed by Emily Mann with Mary McDonnell, Earl Hyman, John Spencer, Stanley Tucci. On Broadway, Virginia Theater; Mark Bly, dramaturg.
1987	The Misanthrope by Molière. Translated by Richard Wilbur. Directed by Garland Wright, Guthrie Theater with Daniel Davis; Mark Bly, dramaturg.
1987	Leon and Lena (and Lenz) by Georg Büchner. Translated by Henry Schmidt. Directed by JoAnne Akalaitis with Jesse Borrego and Don Cheadle, Guthrie Theater; Mark Bly, dramaturg.
1989	Pravda by Howard Brenton and David Hare. American Premiere. Directed by Robert Falls, Guthrie Theater; Mark Bly, dramaturg.
1992	Conversations with My Father by Herb Gardner. World Premiere. Directed by Tony Award-winning director Daniel Sullivan with Judd Hirsch and Tony Shalhoub. Seattle Rep; Mark Bly, dramaturg.
1994	The America Play by Suzan-Lori Parks. World Premiere. Directed by Liz Diamond with Gail Grate, Reggie Montgomery and Michael Potts, Yale Repertory Theatre, co-production with The Public Theater; Mark Bly, dramaturg.
1998	Anadarko by Tim Blake Nelson. World Premiere. Directed by Tony Award-winning director Doug Hughes, MCC Theater; Mark Bly, dramaturg.
2001	Hedda Gabler by Henrik Ibsen. English Version by Doug Hughes. Directed by Doug Hughes, Steppenwolf Theatre Company with Martha Plimpton; Mark Bly, dramaturg.
2005	The Passion Play, A Cycle by Sarah Ruhl. World Premiere. Directed by Molly Smith, Arena Stage; Mark Bly, dramaturg.
2007	33 Variations by Moises Kaufman. World Premiere. Directed by Moisés Kaufman, Tectonic Theater Project at Arena Stage, and West Coast premiere at La Jolla Playhouse, 2009; Mark Bly, dramaturg.
2009	33 Variations by Moisés Kaufman. Directed by Moisés Kaufman, Broadway, Eugene O'Neill Theatre with Jane Fonda and Zach Grenier; Mark Bly, dramaturg.
2012	An Enemy of the People by Henrik Ibsen. Directed by Doug Hughes, Broadway, Samuel J. Friedman Theater; Mark Bly, dramaturg.
