= Fucking A =

2000 play by American Suzan-Lori Parks

- Written by: Suzan-Lori Parks
- Original language: English
- Genre: Classical Tragedy
- Setting: USA

Premiere
- Date premiered: February 24, 2000
- Place premiered: Houston, Texas

Fucking A is a play written by American playwright Suzan-Lori Parks. It was produced by DiverseWorks and Infernal Bridegroom Productions and premiered in Houston, Texas on February 24, 2000.

== Background ==
Fucking A is inspired by the novel The Scarlet Letter, written by Nathaniel Hawthorne in 1850. Both of the main characters are mothers named Hester with an unwavering love for their illegitimate child. Both Hesters (like Hester Prynne, the protagonist in Hawthorne's novel), also bear the letter “A” as a symbol of how society defines them: Parks's Hester is an abortionist, while Hawthorne's brand stands for adultery.

The idea for the play came to Parks while canoeing with a friend; she had the premise of "riffing" on The Scarlet Letter and naming the play 'Fucking A'. Parks has said that the idea was initially a joke, but that she continued to think about it. The first handful of years in the drafting and rewriting process did not result in a workable plot, and Parks abandoned everything except the title and the main character's name.

== In the Blood ==
Before writing Fucking A, Parks wrote In the Blood. It is a contemporary telling of Puritan adultery and guilt. The story revolves around Hester La Negrita and her struggle to survive with her five children, all from different fathers, in a world filled with sexual oppression. Once it was finished, she returned to Fucking A. She refers to it as a "revenge tragedy" about abortionist Hester Smith.

== Plot Synopsis ==
Hester Smith is an abortionist, physically branded with the letter “A”. She speaks to her friend Canary Mary about her son Boy, whom she has not seen since he was imprisoned 20 years ago for theft. She plans to write to Boy and is saving to pay for an outing with him.

The rich girl whom Boy stole from has grown up to marry the vicious Mayor and is now the First Lady. Canary confides to Hester that the Mayor has been having an affair with her and is preparing to leave the First Lady because she cannot bear a child. Later, Canary briefly meets an escaped convict, Monster.

In a bar, three hunters brag to each other about which one will catch Monster. Hester arrives at the bar looking for Scribe so that he can write a letter to her son. While there, she meets a man named Butcher, who takes a liking to her. Monster meets the First Lady in the park, they exchange kind words and kiss.

The next day Hester arrives home to find Monster has broken into her home and set it on fire. He robs her of some money, but upon seeing that they have matching scars, he runs off. The next day Hester has enough for her to pay for a furloughed picnic with her son. The guard brings out a prisoner called Jailbait, whom Hester assumes is her son. She embraces him and tries to get him to show her the scar she gave him when he was taken to prison, which matches hers, but he is more interested in the food. Hester realizes Jailbait is not her son, and Jailbait claims that he killed her son in prison. Hester is frozen with shock, and when Jailbait finishes eating and begins to rape her, she is too stunned to resist.

The First Lady discovers she is pregnant and considers aborting the child since Monster may be the father, but she decides to pass the baby as the Mayor's instead. Hester, bent on revenge against the First Lady for putting her son in prison, devises a plan with Canary to kill her. She utilizes Butcher's unwilling help. Upon learning that the First Lady is pregnant, Hester decides to abort the baby instead of killing her. Canary and Butcher bring a drugged First Lady to Hester's house, where she performs an abortion on her.

After Butcher and Canary leave, Monster, chased by the Hunters, runs into the house. Hester accepts that Monster is her son, and he tells Hester that if he is caught, the hunters will torture him. He begs her to kill him. She slits his throat like a pig, which Butcher has told her is the least painful way. The Hunters enter, see that he is dead, and drag his body away to mutilate it. Hester stands alone in her house for a moment, but soon gets her abortion tools and goes into the other room to continue her work.

== Characters ==
- Hester Smith: The abortion provider and main character. Her son has been sent to jail by the First Lady.
- Canary Mary: A friend of Hester's and a "kept woman", a sex-worker.
- The Mayor: Leader of a small piece of land. Cheats on his wife with Canary Mary.
- The First Lady: The Mayor's wife. She is unable to bear children, which bothers the Mayor. She sent Hester's son to jail.
- Butcher: A local butcher who falls in love with Hester.
- Monster: An escaped convict who turns out to be Hester's son. His real name is Boy Smith.
- Freedom Fund Lady: Collects money from Hester for the picnic bail.
- Scribe: He writes beautifully, and Hester goes to him so he can write a letter to her son for her.
- First, Second, and Third Hunter: All three of them are bent on catching Monster for a monetary prize so they can torture him.
- Jailbait: He is mistaken for Hester's son, and he's the one who has the dream picnics with Hester.
- Guard: Brings Jailbait to Hester.
- Waiting Woman #1 and #2: Two women waiting to abort their child.
- 3 Freshly Freed Prisoners: They sing a song during the play.

== Language ==
Suzan-Lori Parks created a separate type of language called "Talk". It is used only by the women in the play. The women who speak in "Talk" also speak English but use "Talk" when they are talking about pregnancy or vaginas.

Here is an example of "Talk":

Canary: Die la-sah Chung-chung? Sah Chung-chung lay schreck, lay frokum, lay woah woah crisp woah-ya.

Translation: And her pussy? Her pussy is so disgusting, so slack so very wholly dried out.

Hester: Rich Girl she tum woah Chun-chung crisp woah-ya, Rich Girl!

Translation: Rich girl your pussy is all dried out, Rich Girl!

When "Talk" is used, there is a projector of some sort that shows the translation onto the stage.

== Music ==
Suzan-Lori Parks wrote numerous songs for this play, often performed during break-off scenes where characters will begin to sing.

This is the song "The Making of a Monster":

Monster: "The Making of a Monster"

"You'd think it'd be hard
To make something horrid
It's easy.

You'd think it would take
So much work to create
The Devil Incarnate
It's easy.

The smallest seed grows into a tree
A grain of sand pearls in an oyster
A small bit of hate in a heart will inflate
And that’s so much more than enough
To make you a Monster.

You'd think it'd be hard
To make something horrid
It's easy."

== Productions ==
=== Premiere ===
Fucking A was originally produced by DiverseWorks for Infernal Bridgegroom Productions on February 24, 2000, in Houston, Texas. Suzan-Lori Parks directed it. The cast included Tamarie Cooper, Amy Bruce, Charlie Scott, Amy Dickson, Andy Nelson, Troy Schulze, Lisa Marie Singerman, Cary Winscott, Keith Reynolds, Alexander Marchand, and Daniel Treadway.

=== Off-Broadway ===
==== Public Theater ====
It was presented Off-Broadway at the Public Theatre, opening on February 25, 2003. Directed by Michael Greif, the cast consisted of Susan Blommaert, Bobby Cannavale, Mos Def, Peter Gerety, Jojo Gonzalez, Jesse Lenat, S. Epatha Merkerson, Manu Narayan, Chandler Parker, Daphne Rubin-Vega and Michole Briana White.

==== Signature Theatre Company ====
It was presented Off-Broadway at the Romulus Linney Courtyard Theater, in Pershing Square Signature Center, opening on August 22, 2017, in conjunction with Parks's other play, In the Blood. These plays were presented as part of Residency One, a year-long artist residency at Signature Theatre. Directed by Jo Bonney, the cast consisted of J. Cameron Barnett, Brandon Victor Dixon, Ben Horner, Joaquina Kalukango, Marc Kudisch, Christine Lahti, Ruibo Qian, Elizabeth Stanley, and Raphael Nash Thompson.
