= Chana Porter =

American playwright, novelist, and education activist

Chana Porter is an American playwright, novelist, and education activist. Her debut novel, The Seep, was a finalist for the Lambda Literary Award for Transgender Fiction.

== Education and background ==
Porter received a Master of Fine Arts degree from Goddard College, where she studied with author Rachel Pollack.

== Career ==
Chana co-founded the Octavia Project, "a free summer writing and STEM program for Brooklyn teenage girls and non-binary youth."

She has taught at University of Houston, Fordham University, Hampshire College, Goddard College, Weber State University, and Sarah Lawrence's Global Classroom.

Her plays have been developed or produced at The Flea Theater, Playwrights Horizons, The Catastrophic Theatre, La MaMa, Rattlestick Playwrights Theatre, Cherry Lane, The Invisible Dog, and Movement Research. The New York Times has said that her work as a playwright "uses incongruity and exaggeration to suggest some midnight-dark truths about human life and endeavor."

=== The Seep ===
The Seep was published January 21, 2020 by Soho Press. The book received a starred review from Publishers Weekly, Booklist, and Library Journal, as well as a positive review from Tor.com. The audiobook, narrated by Shakina Nayfack, received a positive review from Booklist.

The Seep was a finalist for the 2021 Lambda Literary Award for Transgender Fiction.

=== The Thick and the Lean ===
Porter's second novel, The Thick and the Lean, was published by Saga Press in April 2023. The book was a finalist for the 2024 Lambda Literary Award for Speculative Fiction.

== Personal life ==
Porter lives in Los Angeles, California. She uses she/they pronouns.

== Publications ==
- The Seep (2020)
- The Thick and the Lean (2023)
