= Venus (play) =

1996 play by Suzan-Lori Parks

- Original language: English
- Written by: Suzan-Lori Parks
- Characters: Sarah Baartman; Georges Cuvier
- Subject: Love; Race and ethnicity
- Setting: South Africa; London; Paris

Venus is a 1996 play written by American playwright Suzan-Lori Parks about the life of Khoekhoe woman Sarah Baartman. Set during the 19th century, the play opens in South Africa where Baartman was born, before transitioning to Europe as Baartman begins to perform in freak shows in London. The play then transitions to Paris where she continues her freak show act before dying in 1815 after being under the study of a group of French scientists led by Georges Cuvier. Her deceased body becomes the subject of a pseudoscientific autopsy that focuses on Baartman's steatopygia– a condition which Cuvier (who appears as the Baron Docteur in Venus), uses to his academic advantage. Parks' work is not intended to be historically accurate, but rather uses the concept of Baartman's career to explore colonialism, racialization, and the historical sexualization of Black women; as Parks explains, "most of it's fabricated... It's questioning the history of history... It embraces the unrecorded truth." Venus won 2 OBIE Awards in 1995–1996.

== Characters ==
=== In Venus ===
- Miss Saartjie Baartman – introduced as the Girl, and later becomes the "Hottentot Venus"
- The Mother-Showman – owner of the Girl and the 8 Human Wonders
- The Baron Docteur – doctor from Paris who later becomes the owner and husband of Venus Hottentot
- The Grade-School Chum – old friend of the Baron Docteur
- The Negro Resurrectionist – the host and story guide; was once in the business of illegal unearthing of corpses for doctors to scientifically analyze
- The Man – finances the Girl's journey to London
- The Brother – the Man's Brother; takes the Girl to London

=== In "For the Love of the Venus." ===
- The Bride-to-Be – a woman in love with the Young Man, later guised as The Hottentot Venus
- The Young Man – wants to love a Wild Thing; wants to love The Hottentot Venus
- The Father – conspires with his son, the Young Man, to acquire The Hottentot Venus
- The Mother – mother of the Young Man, conspires with the Bride-to-Be to disguise her as The Hottentot Venus
- The Uncle – uncle of the Young Man, presents the disguised Bride-to-Be to his nephew
- The Baron Docteur – the audience for the first two acts
- The Negro Resurrectionist – audience for the final three acts
- The Venus – watches the Baron Docteur watch the play

== Plot in Venus ==
=== Overture ===
Venus opens with a revolving showcase of the protagonist, Miss Saartjie Baartman, while the Negro Resurrectionist hails her stage-name, "The Venus Hottentot!" – an exclamation that is repeated by the Brother and the Man. Here, all of the leading characters and choruses in Venus take turns shouting each other's names, and the roles they will later characterize in the play, to their audience. The Negro Resurrectionist proceeds to foreshadow to two audiences–the Venus characters and the live audience–about the death of The Venus Hottentot; and which the Brother and the Venus continue to address, "I regret to inform you that thuh Venus Hottentot iz dead. There wont b inny show tuhnite.". The chorus becomes an enraged audience in response to the show's cancellation, meanwhile its members talk about paying their way to look at, feel inside (the cage), and comment on sexual aspects of the naked prize they call the Venus Hottentot. The overture concludes after the Negro Resurrectionist uses a rhyme scheme (i.e., AABBCCDD) while summarizing (what he has come to know about) the course of Venus's life and death in Europe.

=== The Girl (scenes 31-26) ===
Saartjie Baartman's story in Venus begins in South Africa in the early 1800s, where she is introduced as a servant called 'the Girl'. The Brother is currently trying to persuade the Man (his brother) to financially invest in a two-year performance act in London. While the Girl scrubs a floor on her hands and knees in the presence of the Man's Brother and the Man, she becomes an object of their interest to create a Freak Act that will exhibit the Girl's unique genitalia and buttocks– also referred to as steatopygia. The Girl agrees to travel with the Brother to London under false pretence that they will split the profit of her African dancing act, believing that in two-years' time she will return to South Africa with fame and wealth. However, before the Girl reaches the end of her supposed contract, the Brother sells her to a new boss called the Mother-Showman. The Mother-Showman runs a freak show in London, consisting of 8 Human Wonders, and she intends for the Girl to be the 9th Wonder. It is during scene 27–when the Mother-Showman forces the Girl to bathe herself–that the Girl begins her life as the Venus Hottentot.

=== The Venus (scenes 25-17) ===
The year is 1810, and the Venus Hottentot's exhibition of her nudity and dancing has become a lucrative business for the Mother-Showman. However, a large sum of the riches gained from Hottentot's act comes from spectators who pay the Mother-Showman for private exhibitions so that they can feel her genitalia and buttocks. After a year of performing in the freak show, Venus becomes the subject of a riot caused by her supposed public indecency, whereupon she appears before the law in front of a court and is eventually released after the judge agrees with Baartman's plea that "her show is part of God's great plan." Shortly before Venus's trial in front of the Court, the Baron Docteur's fascination in her was revealed, whereafter, he approaches the Mother-Showman to buy The Venus so as to study her steatopygia and genitalia before and after her death. Upon the characters first introduction, the Baron Docteur treats The Venus kindly–offering her chocolates, money, new clothes–so long as she agrees (which she does) to move to his home in Paris, France.

=== Intermission (scene 16) ===
During this rest period, the Baron Docteur reemerges as himself, but several years in the future, and proceeds to read aloud a detailed anatomy of the deceased Venus Hottentot. In-between the Baron Docteur's speech, The Bride-to-be reads her love letters aloud; foreshadowing a near-identical poem recited by the Baron Docteur to Venus in the past (i.e., the future, within the course of Venus).

The Bride-to-be's poem: "My love for you, My Love, is artificial // Fabricated much like this epistle // Constructed with mans finest powrs // Will last through the days and the weeks and the hours.".

The Baron Docteur's poem: "My love for you is artificial // Fabricated much like this epistle // Its crafted with my finest powers // To last through the days and the weeks and the hours.".

After the Baron Docteur finishes his speech on the Venus's anatomy, he exits the stage, and the 7th Wonder enters to sing a song about The Venus Hottentot until the end of Intermission

=== The Venus (scenes 15-1) ===
While living in Paris, Venus and the Baron Docteur become engaged in a love affair, which takes place amid her continuous physical examinations that the Chorus of the 8 Anatomists perform at the medical academy. During this period, the Baron Docteur is unexpectedly visited by the Grade-School Chum, whom, on multiple encounters tries to convince the Baron Docteur to eradicate Venus from his personal life and from his work. When The Venus falls ill to the clap (a term for gonorrhea)–suspected to be from the Docteur–The Grade-School Chum persuades the Baron Docteur to imprison The Venus in chains for indecency. While The Negro Resurrectionist stands as Watchman over the Venus, the Grade-School Chum appears and forcefully bribes the Negro Resurrectionist to exhume the Venus' corpse upon her demise. Soon after, the Venus dies while in mid-conversation with the Negro Resurrectionist– five years after she first set foot in Paris. The Baron Docteur is able to complete his full anatomy on the Hottentot Venus, and her body parts and skeleton are eventually displayed in the Musée de l'Homme. Venus concludes in the same way it began, with the Negro Resurrectionist announcing to the audience, "I regret to inform you that thuh Venus Hottentot iz dead. [...] There wont b inny show tuhnite.". The Baron Docteur and the Negro Resurrectionist each offer their own speculations for the Venus' death, only to be reminded by Venus herself that, "Thuh Venus Hottentot iz dead. There wont b inny show tuhnite.". The Grade-School Chum joins in with breaking the upsetting news to the audience (perhaps both the audience of Venus characters and the audience of Venus spectators). Venus nears the finale with a short summary of the Venus' encounter with, and embodiment of Love and Death. Which leads into the Negro Resurrectionist's final narration, "A Scene of Love:", whereafter Venus ends the play by saying, "Kiss me Kiss me Kiss me Kiss".

== Plot in "For the love of the Venus." ==
Written within Parks' Venus is another play called, "For the Love of the Venus". This is an adaptation of a French vaudeville called The Hottentot Venus, or The Hatred of French Women, written in 1814.

=== Act I, scene 3 (scene 29 in Venus) ===
[The Baron Docteur is the audience, and the Venus watches him]

The Bride-to-Be waits on the Young Man, who appears uninterested in her offerings and bored by her presence. He begins reading from a notebook about his fathers reflections on travelling to Africa. The Bride-to-Be cries out in sorrow of being unloved.

=== Act II, scene 10 (scene 23 in Venus) ===
[The Baron Docteur is the audience, and the Venus watches him]

The Father, the Uncle, and the Young Man discuss the Young Man's desire to love "something Wild" before he marries the Bride-to-Be. The three men conspire to obtain The Hottentot Venus for the Young Man when her show arrives in their town. The Uncle promises to present his nephew with a Thing to love in two weeks time.

=== Act II, scene 12 (scene 11 in Venus) ===
[The Baron Docteur and Venus are absent, so the Negro Resurrectionist becomes the audience, but appears inattentive]

The Bride-to-Be is in dismay over the Young Man's love for The Hottentot Venus. She discloses this information to the Mother (of the Young Man), who makes a plan to work with the Uncle on dressing up the Bride-to-Be in the guise of The Hottentot Venus.

=== Act III, scene 9 (scene 8 in Venus) ===
[The Negro Resurrectionist is the audience]

The Uncle presents the Young Man to The Hottentot Venus, who is actually an impersonation by the Bride-to-Be. The Hottentot Venus tells the Uncle–through a series of clucking–that she is Wild, and the Young Man proceeds to stare at her. The two share a silent moment.

While the characters stand motionless, the Negro Resurrectionist reads an excerpt from the Baron Docteur's autopsy notes on the Venus.

=== Conclusion (scene 4 in Venus) ===
[The Baron Docteur and the Venus watch the play separately]

The Young Man and The Hottentot Venus continue to stare at each another, and the Young Man has fallen in love. The Hottentot Venus is assured by the Young Man that her core self is what he loves, so the Bride-to-Be removes her disguise, and is offered a box of chocolates from the Young Man. The two lovers stand motionless until the curtain are drawn closed.

== Order of scenes ==
The plot of Venus moves forward chronologically while the scenes are ordered backwards from thirty-one to one. Parks' utility of scene reversal is a device she uses to remind the audience of the countdown to Saartjie's/ The Venus's death, whereupon her life begins again with scene one. Knowledge of The Venus Hottentot's death is a critical part of the prologue as Parks purposefully relocates the audience to a period of time where Saartjie Baartman–now The Venus Hottentot–is dead, but then becomes resurrected on stage to tell a version of her story that once again returns to her death.

== Literary devices ==
=== Repetition and revision ===
A signature feature in Parks' plays is her use of Joseph Roach's repetition with revision, or 'rep and rev'. This is a literary style in theatrical performance which allows for historical moments to be remade in the present through repetition of dialogues and actions, while being slightly revised with each re-occurrence. In Venus, Parks replays historical events on stage as a response to the ways that black bodies have been historically subjected to abusive and unlawful power dynamics. Beyond the character's dialogues and actions, the entire Venus play is a performance of repetition and revision in the way it retells a story of Saartjie Baartman. 'Rep and Rev' begins immediately in the Overture with dialogue like, "I regret to inform you that thuh Venus Hottentot iz dead... There wont b inny show tuhnite.", "Exposure iz what killed her", and "Thus doctor says she drank too much.". Parks repeats these lines in the final chorus, "There wont b inny show tuhnite.", "I say she died of drink.", and "Miss me, Miss me, Miss me". Parks' use of 'rep and rev' also appears in Venus's questions about her choice. When Baartman's character is the Girl, she asks the Brother whether she has a choice to move to London, and later, when her character is the Venus, she asks the Baron Docteur whether she has a choice to move to Paris. Baartman's question is the same in both scenarios, however, Venus repeats this question with new experiences from performing in London, while being geographically situated in a new location.

== Analysis and criticism ==
=== Historical accuracy of Venus and Venus ===
Venus is based on some of the life events that have been recorded about a Khoekhoe woman, born in modern-day South Africa, who was known as Saartjie Baartman. What is known about the life of Baartman/ Venus Hottentot does not originate from primary sources in Baartman's perspective, rather, Baartman's life is known through secondary sources such as descriptions from spectators who saw her in Europe, owners of the freak show she was a part of, and autopsy notes from a team of French scientists led by Georges Cuvier. The voice of Baartman is seldom known, as is how her personality reacted to European colonial dehumanization and objectification of Khoisan women. Cuvier's notes and detailed autopsy report provides among the most detail of Baartman, but none of which provides insight of her first-hand encounters as a part of a freak show in Europe, or during her final years spent in Paris under the observation of Cuvier and his research team. Baartman's story has been repeated through other people's historical accounts on her, and Parks responds to their secondary accounts and pseudo-scientific research when she writes Venus in a style that is "...questioning the history of history.". A description from a French scientist named Henri de Blainville, who studied Baartman when she was alive, provides the only account on Baartman's resistance when he highlight the "great difficulty convincing Sarah... to let herself be seen nude.", and how, despite their efforts to bribe her with money, no scientist ever saw Baartman's genitalia in detail until after her demise in 1815. Without any known primary sources from Baartman's narrative of her experiences in the years before her death, few certainties can be confirmed on the historical accuracy of the life events of Saartjie Baartman. Parks also toys with Baartman's character by creating a diva within Venus. While living with the Baron Docteur in Paris, Venus enters a monologue which reveals internalized fantasies of directing her servants, and of mingling in with upper-class members while be waited upon. Venus enjoys lifestyles of high-society, and gains pleasure in situating herself on the privileged side of a servant-master power dynamic, but unknown is whether the real Saartjie Baartman could, or wanted to participate in this lifestyle. Parks' retelling of Baartman's story and personality–as a woman with agency, and the taste of a diva–could be as far fabricated or as realistic as "the unrecorded truth" on Baartman's history.

=== Dynamic structure: Love ===
==== Historical relations ====
Love is the foremost represented genre in Parks' Venus. The Hottentot Venus' name takes after Venus, the goddess of love, beauty, sex and fertility in ancient Roman mythology, and prior to that, Aphrodite in ancient Greek mythology. Both goddesses represent a Western-European profile of erotic beauty, and procreation, however, an assignation of goddess-like attributes to Black women in the early-19th century treads on historically racist and oppressive grounds. On several occasions in Venus, the Negro Resurrectionist announces that "The year was 1810, three years after the Bill for the Abolition of Slave-Trade had been passed in Parliament, and among the protests and denials, the horror and fascination, The Venus show went on." The transatlantic slave trade occurred during the same period as the rise of racialist ideas in Europe, which Parks' personifies in the Baron Docteur. Enslaved Black women in the Americas were frequently called "Venus" by their enslavers, which directly influenced the decision to term Baartman the "Hottentot Venus". Moments after Parks' Girl transforms into The Hottentot Venus, after being sold by the Brother to the Mother-Showman, the Negro Resurrectionist alludes to an illegal and historically inhumane reality attached to Venus's character. Elements of slave-ownership enmeshed with lustful desire towards Black women appear in Venus between the Venus and the Baron Docteur. This "Black Venus master narrative" is replayed by Parks in the Baron Docteurs' characterization as a lover of Venus–whom he impregnates twice–and as an owner of Venus from the time he bought her from the Mother-Showman.

==== Personification ====
Love is a repeated theme in nearly every scene in Venus, and in every characters' interaction with Venus. Parks accomplishes this repetition by personifying love in three forms; the "love-object" is Venus, the unloved is the Bride-To-Be, and the lover emerges in both the Baron Docteur as the dis-rememberer, and the Negro Resurrectionist as the rememberer. Venus is an object of love from the moment the Overture begins. As characters announce her death and the cancellation of the show, Venus' body–once a performative object–is now absent, causing outrage among the Chorus of Spectators who 'love' her. When time rewinds to the Girl's early life in South Africa, the Brother promises the Girl (in an effort to persuade her to move to London) that people will love her if she dances for them–another use of Parks' love-objectification of Venus' body. When the Girl later emerges from the Mother-Showman's forcible bathing attempts, the Negro Resurrectionist discloses his admiration of the Girl, saying, "Yr lovely.", shortly before she transforms into the Venus Hottentot. The Negro Resurrectionist sees and loves Venus' as Saartjie Baartman from South Africa, much unlike the Spectators, the Anatomists, the Brother, and the Mother-Showman who love the spectacle, research, and wealth which has been produced through her racialized and sexualized body. The Baron Docteur is another lover of Venus, whose affection intertwines with scientific fame that he aspires to achieve after Venus' autopsy.

=== "For the Love of the Venus." ===
Parks maintains the plays' original plot from The Hottentot Venus/ The Hatred of French Women, while repeating the dominant narrative of a white, Eurocentric, and supremacist hierarchy over non-whites. Parks' play-within-a-play parallels with themes in Venus in the way fetishization of The Hottentot Venus (and other black women of her time) is a "literal fabric-ation" made by people from Western Europe to help them attain other goals for themselves. In Venus, the Baron Docteur engages in a love affair with Venus–sweet-talking and feeding her chocolates–until her death allows him to complete her autopsy, and justify his purpose for admiring her. In "For the Love of the Venus.", the Young Man decides that before he agrees to marry the Bride-to-Be, he must experience love with The Hottentot Venus. His goal is fulfilled, and so is the Bride-to-Be's goal (to marry the Young Man) when the Bride-to-Be disguises herself as The Hottentot Venus through a no-longer socially acceptable form of performative make-up called blackface. In every instance where Parks' white character's achieve their goals, The Hottentot Venus becomes an object of love for each of their grand schemes. Through Parks' retelling of blackface history, past and present misrepresentations and mockeries of black female performers by non-black persons are made vulnerable for critique.

=== Feminism ===
Venus has been examined by a number of scholars, including Lisa Anderson who analyzed it as a commentary on the femininity and sexuality of women of African descent. Theatre and cinema scholar Jean Young states that the ahistorical portrayal "reifies the perverse imperialist mind set, and [Parks'] mythic historical reconstruction subverts the voice of Saartjie Baartman;" she further points out the ironic re-objectification of Baartman in its attempt to portray her story.

However, other critiques argue that the portrayal actually objectifies the colonizers instead of the heroine. New York Times critic Ben Brantley stated that Parks "doesn't present Baartman as just an uncomprehending victim", implying that Parks had written Baartman in way that suggested that Baartman prolonged her own imprisonment for the sake of fame. Conversely, Jennifer Larson writes that Baartman's character "certainly engages the imperial/hegemonic/white power with innovative and creative tactics, but these tactics are not historically unique.".

== Production history ==
Venus was produced by George C. Wolfe in conjunction with The Joseph Papp Public Theater, The New York Shakespeare Festival, and the Yale Repertory Theatre. The play opened at the Public Theater on April 16, 1996, and closed on June 19, 1996, after 22 performances. It was directed by Richard Foreman, with Adina Porter as Saartjie Baartman and Peter Francis James as the Baron Docteur.

The play opened Off-Broadway at the Signature Theatre on May 15, 2017. Directed by Lear deBessonet, the cast features Zainab Jah as Baartman.

== Awards ==
- 1995–1996 OBIE Award for Playwriting for Suzan-Lori Parks
- 1995–1996 OBIE Award for Distinguished Performance by an Actress for Adina Porter
