= White Noise (play) =

2019 play by Susan-Lori Parks

- 2019 theatrical poster
- Written by: Suzan-Lori Parks
- Characters: Leo; Dawn; Ralph; Misha
- Subject: Racism

Premiere
- Date: 2019
- Place: The Public Theater, New York City
- Directed by: Oskar Eustis

White Noise is a 2019 play by Suzan-Lori Parks. It premiered at The Public Theater in New York.

== Characters ==
The central characters are two woke interracial couples, good friends since college.

- Leo, a black artist and insomniac. He has tried a white noise machine to help him sleep, and describes himself as "the fractured and angry and edgy black visual artist."
- Dawn, a white liberal lawyer. Something of a "white saviour".
- Ralph, a white and wealthy writer.
- Misha, the black host of the YouTube show Ask a Black.

=== Notable casts ===
Character	Off Broadway	London	DC
Character	2019	2021	2022
Leo	Daveed Diggs	Ken Nwosu	RJ Brown
Dawn	Zoe Winters	Helena Wilson	Katie Kleiger
Ralph	Thomas Sadoski	James Corrigan	Quinn Franzen
Misha	Sheria Irving	Faith Omole	Tatiana Williams

== Plot ==
Leo, out walking one night, is assaulted by police. To regain a sense of safety, he asks his friend Ralph to buy him as a slave for forty days, positing that he will be safer as a white man's property. Ralph, initially terrified of being white, male and straight, agrees. Their new relationship corrupts Ralph and releases his inner "whitey", and he joins a club exclusively for whites. In the second act, Ralph makes Leo wear a slave collar.

== Productions ==
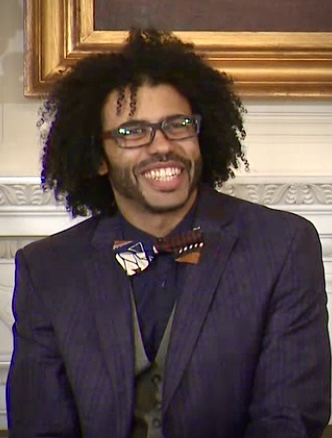
Daveed Diggs played the part of Leo in 2019

The 2019 debut at The Public Theater in New York was directed by Oskar Eustis, and included Daveed Diggs as Leo, Zoe Winters as Dawn, Thomas Sadoski as Ralph and Sheria Irving as Misha.

A 2021 London production at the Bridge Theatre was directed by Polly Findlay, and included Ken Nwosu as Leo, Helena Wilson as Dawn, James Corrigan as Ralph and Faith Omole as Misha.

One change between the New York and London productions is that while in the 2019 production the characters hang out in a bowling alley, their hang out is a shooting range in 2021. 2021 reviewers have noted that the play brings to mind the 2020 murder of George Floyd, though it premiered the year before.

An early 2022 production at the Studio Theatre, Washington, D.C. was directed by Reginald L. Douglas. It included RJ Brown as Leo, Katie Kleiger as Dawn, Quinn Franzen as Ralph and Tatiana Williams as Misha. There were significant changes made from the 2019 production; more than 20 minutes were cut.

== Reception ==
=== 2019 ===
Theater critic Ben Brantley said "Though White Noise runs a full three hours, and skids on some of its plot twists, it doesn’t feel long. By its end, you may marvel at how many forms, faces and exploitative uses of racial identity it has covered. ... In burrowing deep into what one character calls “the worm hole” of how we talk — and think — about race, Ms. Parks isn't cutting anyone any slack. Herself included." The Guardian's reviewer gave the play four out of five stars, saying it "finds [Parks] at her most realistic, which is fun in some ways and frustrating in others. It’s a pleasure to hear her vital, playful intelligence shoved into the mouths of contemporary, recognizable characters and then exasperating when those characters behave implausibly."

Theater critic Hilton Als, in a mostly negative review, found the play lacking compared to some of Parks' earlier work.

=== 2021 ===
The Independent and The Daily Telegraph gave the play four out of five stars. The Independent said that while the scenario is massively implausible, the play "is undercut with a fatalism about a culturally required wokeness that only goes surface-deep, that’s rapidly shrugged off like a heavy coat when things get too heated. It’s grim, brilliantly perceptive, and lets no one off the hook." According to The Daily Telegraph, "its ambitious scope of ideas ensures that the play is funny, challenging, audacious and profoundly unsettling. Three hours seldom passed so quickly."

The Guardian, the newspaper i and the Evening Standard gave the play three out of five stars, The Guardian's reviewer saying that "even when neither the story nor the characters are believable, this is still a propulsive drama with pace, plotting and a deadly magnetism, and its greatest triumph lies in the virtuosity and vigour of its astonishing cast."

The Times gave the play two out of five stars. The reviewer said that while the play is extremely well acted, "Parks demands three hours of your time, and in return offers a rambling piece constructed around a ludicrous premise."

== Awards ==
- 2019 Obie Award, playwriting.
- 2019 Outer Critics Circle Award, outstanding new off-Broadway play.
