= Lisa D'Amour =

American dramatist

Lisa D'Amour is a playwright, performer, and former Carnival Queen from New Orleans. D'Amour is an alumna of New Dramatists. Her play Detroit was a finalist for the Pulitzer Prize for Drama.

== Biography ==
=== Education ===
D'Amour received a B.A. in English and Theater from Millsaps College in Jackson, Mississippi and her M.F.A. in playwriting from the University of Texas at Austin.

=== Personal life ===
Born in Minneapolis, Lisa was raised for most of her life in River Ridge and New Orleans, LA.

=== Work ===
D'Amour's plays include Hide Town produced by Infernal Bridegroom Productions, Houston (2006), Anna Bella Eema produced by New Georges, NYC (2003), Blue Theater/Physical Plant, Austin, TX (2001), and Ten Thousand Things, Minneapolis. Winner, Best New Play, Austin Critics’ Table (2002). Stanley 2006 was to be produced at HERE Arts Center in SoHo, NYC but was withdrawn due to an intellectual property dispute involving the character Stanley Kowalski.

The Cataract was produced Off-Broadway at the Women's Project, running from March 22, 2006, to April 15, 2006, directed by Katie Pearl. The CurtainUp reviewer wrote: "D'Amour's voice is a vibrant new addition to the American theatre, and Women's Project has assembled an exciting team in this brave production." It was originally produced by PlayLabs, Minneapolis, MN, in 2003 and then in Providence, Rhode Island by Perishable Theatre.

Her play Nita & Zita, written and directed by D'Amour, premiered at the State Palace Theater, New Orleans, in June 2002, and was produced Off-Broadway at the HERE Arts Center in 2003. The play won an Obie Award. The play relates the story of two sisters from Romania from the 1920s to the 1940s.

In August 2008, she collaborated with the printmaker / installation artist SWOON on "Swimming Cities of Switchback Sea", a fleet of seven intricately handcrafted vessels that navigated the Hudson River in August 2008. D'Amour made a performance to be presented by the crew in towns along the Hudson.

Her play Detroit, was originally set to première on Broadway in September 2010, after the production at the Steppenwolf Theatre Company, directed by Austin Pendleton. Afterwards, the play opened Off-Broadway at Playwrights Horizons in September 2012.

On March 8, 2014, Cherokee premiered at the Wilma Theater, it was the Woolly commissioned companion piece to Detroit, which was a finalist for the 2011 Pulitzer Prize in Drama, a 2013 Obie Award-winner (Best New American Play) and the 2011 Susan Smith Blackburn prize. This heartfelt and comedic play was D’Amour's examination of what it means to lead an authentic life.

Airline Highway premiered on Broadway in April 2015, marking her Broadway debut. The play was commissioned by the Steppenwolf Theater, Chicago, and opened there in December 2014. Airline Highway received four 2015 Tony Award nominations. The play received three 2015 Drama Desk Award nominations, including Outstanding Featured Actress in a Play (Julie White), Outstanding Featured Actor in a Play (K. Todd Freeman) and Outstanding Play. This play examines a tight knit community of “outsiders” over the course of a single, legendary day. The Hummingbird Hotel is the figurative or literal home for a group of strippers, French Quarter service workers, hustlers, and poets who are bound together by their bad luck, bad decisions, and complete lack of pretense.

In 2018, D'amour wrote La Traviata, a short adaptation of Verdi's opera of the same title set in New Orleans, commissioned by Playing on Air. The episode was released in Fall 2019 featuring Debra Monk, Johanna Day, Katie Finneran, Zach Appelman, and directed by Michael Wilson.

=== Collaboration ===
She is co-artistic director of PearlDamour, with Katie Pearl, making collaborative, often site-specific performances. For 20 years, they have been an Obie-Award-winning collaborative team who are known for large-scale performances that mix theater and installation — such as How to Build a Forest, an 8-hour performance in which they assemble and disassemble a simulated forest on an empty stage for over 8 hours. Their work has been honored with the Lee Reynolds Award (2011), an Obie Award (2003) and two “Best Site Specific Performance” citations from the Gothamist for Bird Eye Blue Print (2007) and from the Minneapolis City Pages for LandMARK (2005). Their work is interdisciplinary – crafted by extensive collaborations with artists of other fields.

D'Amour teaches playwriting, collaboration, workshops on interdisciplinary performance and serves as a mentor to individual playwrights and groups looking to devise their own work. Her workshops incorporate examples from her own work and process as well as in-class exercises and writing games. She has taught in universities, writing centers, theaters and high schools. Places she has taught workshops are Brown University, University of Iowa, University of Texas at Austin, University of Tulsa, University of Houston, and University of Rochester, to name a few.

Lisa D'Amour currently holds the Lyndall Finley Wortham Chair in the Performing Arts, in the McGovern College of the Arts at the University of Houston.

== Awards ==
- 2002: Best New Play from Austin Critics’ Table for Ten Thousand Things
- 2003 Obie Award for Nita & Zita
- 2008: A grant from the Alpert Awards in the Arts in Theatre, a $75,000 mid-career grant
- 2008: 'MAP' fund award for Terrible Things with collaborator Katie Pearl
- 2009: Creative Capital Award for How to Build a Forest
- 2011: Steinberg Playwright Award with Melissa James Gibson.
