= Detroit (play) =

American award-winning theatre play

- Farrar, Straus and Giroux cover
- Written by: Lisa D'Amour
- Characters: Sharon; Kenny; Ben; Frank; Mary
- Original language: English
- Genre: Comedy/Drama
- Setting: Detroit, Michigan

Premiere
- Date premiered: September 10, 2010
- Place premiered: Steppenwolf Theatre Company, Chicago

Detroit is a play by Lisa D'Amour. It was a finalist for the Pulitzer and Susan Smith Blackburn Prizes. The play premiered at the Steppenwolf Theatre Company in Chicago in 2010 and subsequently ran Off-Broadway at Playwrights Horizons in fall 2012. The play won the Obie Award for Best New American Play in 2013.

== Synopsis ==
Mary and Ben live in an unnamed suburb near a midsize American city, but the city is never specified. Ben has just lost his job as a bank loan officer, and is starting a new job operating an Internet site to give help to people who are in debt. Mary and Ben are hosting their new neighbors, Sharon and Kenny, with a backyard barbecue. Sharon and Kenny live next door in a rented house which has no furniture. During the course of the play, the characters discuss suburban angst related to upward mobility, spousal relationships and economic anxiety.

== Production history ==
=== Chicago (2010) ===
The Steppenwolf Theatre Company presented the play at the Steppenwolf Theatre in Chicago, Illinois, from September 10, 2010, to November 7, 2010. It was directed by Austin Pendleton and choreographed by Tommy Rapley. The Chicago production featured Kevin Anderson as Kenny, Laurie Metcalf as Mary, Kate Arrington as Sharon, Ian Barford as Ben and Robert Breuler as Frank. Lighting was by Kevin Rigdon, sets by Kevin Depinet, costumes by Rachel Healy, and sound by Josh Schmidt.

=== Off-Broadway (2012) ===
Although Detroit was originally expected to transfer to Broadway in Fall 2011, the play received its New York premiere Off-Broadway at Playwrights Horizons in 2012.

The play opened on September 18, 2012, after previews from August 24, with a cast that featured David Schwimmer, Amy Ryan and John Cullum, directed by Anne Kauffman. The limited run was extended from October 7 to October 18, 2012.

=== London (2012) ===
In 2012, a production of Detroit opened at the Royal National Theatre in London, United Kingdom in the Cottesloe Theatre. It was once again directed by Austin Pendleton.

=== Detroit (2013) ===
A production of Detroit premiered at the Hilberry Theater at Wayne State University in Detroit. The cast featured Brandy Joe Plambeck, Vanessa Sawson, Dani Cochrane, and David Sterritt. It was directed by Lavinia Hart.

=== Washington, DC (2013) ===
A production of Detroit premiered at Woolly Mammoth Theatre Company in September, 2013. The cast includes Woolly Company Members Emily Townley and Michael Willis. Gabriela Fernandez-Coffey, Tim Getman, and Danny Gavigan. The set was designed by Tom Kamm.

=== Ottawa, ON (2014) ===
Detroit received its Canadian premiere in January 2014 at The Gladstone Theatre in Ottawa. It is directed by Chris Ralph and will feature Teri Loretto Valentik, David Whiteley, Stephanie Izsak, David Benedict Brown and Geoff Gruson. A Plosive Production.

== Awards and nominations ==
On April 18, 2011, the winner of the 2011 Pulitzer Prize for Drama was announced. Detroit was a finalist along with the play A Free Man of Color, with the winner being Clybourne Park. The piece was also a finalist for the Susan Smith Blackburn Prize.

Detroit won the Obie Award for Best New American Play for 2013.

== Response ==
Chris Jones in the Chicago Tribune wrote of the show: "Sure, D’Amour ultimately does not delve as deep as one might wish into the implications of the situation she so richly and vividly realizes. And Austin Pendleton’s quirky and amusing production doesn’t always keep its balance ... But D’Amour has penned a very provocative snapshot of the perilous moment ... that sense of dislocation is exquisitely embodied in the work of Laurie Metcalf, an actress who long has understood the precarious dreams of the lower-middle class. Her blistering performance here has the incision of a laser, creating a character who knows that everything is going away and tries to figure out what that might mean."

"The dream here is the 1960s first-ring suburb," said Michael Brosilow, "where neighbors socialize and kids play outside. But in 2010, "does anyone talk to their neighbors anymore?" Sharon asks, before revealing that she and Kenny are recovering substance abusers. That revelation puts the first chinks in the veneer of Mary and Ben’s safe-and-happy home life; we come to see how close they are to the precipice."

Mary Shen Barnidge of the Windy City Times observed, "Despite the serious questions it raises, D'Amour's premise has all the makings of a situation comedy. There's even a drunk scene—that standby of 1950s farce—along with extended recitations of heavily-symbolic dreams and the bizarre street names characteristic of open-box-add-water subdivisions to escalate the atmosphere of dislocation."

The London production received similar responses. Many praised D'Amour's writing and Michael Billington in The Guardian wrote: "D'Amour makes some interesting points in this two-hour play: especially about the lingering suburban dream of a post-Thoreau, back-to-nature existence that leads the two women to set out on an abortive camping trip, which is matched by the hard-up guys planning a nocturnal rave-up. But, although D'Amour registers the solitude and despair of the innercity suburbs, she only briefly relates that to the broader picture of American decline and consigns a lecture on the loss of communal values to an awkward coda." Time Out London gave the London production a four out of five star rating and wrote: "'Detroit' looks like a very fine small-scale play that's trying a touch too hard to embrace big national themes. But there's a lovely looseness, rhythm and exhilaration to D'Amour's writing, especially in the tender, misguided relationship between the two women, who take off for a weekend camping in the woods....but only make it as far as the gas station. It is most original when it advances on Betty Friedan in its wry, acute portrait of contemporary suburban women living dangerously, on the tightrope between boredom and self-destruction." The Blog, A Cultured Lad gave it a positive review stating that "D’Amour’s play is fierce, and ferociously funny. Her dialogue is spot on and the characters are immensely entertaining personalities."
