= Getting Mother's Body =

2003 debut novel by Suzan-Lori Parks

Getting Mother's Body: A Novel
- Author: Suzan-Lori Parks
- Language: English
- Publisher: Random House
- Publication date: 2003
- ISBN: 1-4000-6022-2 (first edition)
- Dewey Decimal: 813.54
- LC Class: PS3566.A736 G4

Getting Mother's Body: A Novel is a 2003 novel by Suzan-Lori Parks, published by Random House. It was her debut novel, after she previously won the Pulitzer Prize for Drama for the play Topdog/Underdog in 2002. It reimagines William Faulkner's As I Lay Dying as about an African American family in Texas in 1963.
