= The Colored Museum =

Play written by George C. Wolfe

The Colored Museum is a play written by George C. Wolfe that premiered at Crossroads Theatre in 1986, directed by L. Kenneth Richardson. In a series of 11 “exhibits” (sketches), the revue explores and satirizes prominent themes and identities of African-American culture.

== Exhibits (sketches) ==
- Git on Board: Miss Pat, a flight attendant, welcomes the audience aboard the fictional “celebrity slaveship,” whose Savannah-bound journey from the Gold Coast (present Ghana) demands that passengers (audience) are to obey the “Fasten Shackles” sign and are not to rebel. The sketch explores and critiques the history of African Americans, from slavery to the regency of the basketball star.
- Cooking' with Aunt Ethel: Mammy Aunt Ethel hosts a cooking show in which she sings the recipe on how to “bake yourself a batch of Negros.”
- The Photo Session: A glamorous black couple wearing “the best of everything and perfect smiles,” retreat from their past/history into a superficial world of narcissistic glamour. The Photo Session is Wolfe’s critique on the images and models of Ebony magazine.
- Soldier with a Secret: In a monologue, an African American soldier sees his peers' painful future and chooses to spare them the inevitable by killing them before they are forced to endure what their future holds.
- The Gospel According to Miss Roj: Miss Roj, a transgender woman, “looks beneath the surface of her glittery nocturnal existence to find maggot-laced visions of ‘a whole race trashed and debased’ while in a homosexual nightclub."
- The Hairpiece: A woman getting ready for a date is faced with an identity crisis when her two wigs, one a 1960s afro wig, the other a “long flowing wig,” come to life and “debate the ideological identity conflicts they represented in their owner’s life for 20 years.”
- The Last Mama-on-the-Couch Play: Presented by a “Masterpiece Theater”-type announcer, this exhibit explores and satirizes Black drama formula used in theater and film. Some characters include a “well worn” mama on her “well worn” couch who fights with her son Walter-Lee-Beau-Willie-Jones whose “brow is heavy from three hundred years of oppression.” The Last Mama-on-the-Couch is Wolfe’s parody of Raisin in the Sun and goes from overacted melodrama to an all-black Broadway musical number. The Lady in Plaid, who is Walter-Lee-Beau-Willie-Jones' wife, is nod to the play For Colored Girls Who Have Considered Suicide / When the Rainbow Is Enuf where each of the unnamed women were referred to as The lady in [a color] (e.g., The Lady in Brown). In For Colored Girls, Beau Willie drops his kids (which he has with The Lady in Brown) out the window like Walter-Lee-Beau-Willie-Jones does to his children with The Lady in Plaid. Walter-Lee-Beau-Willie-Jones's sister, Medea, represents the black Madea.
- Symbiosis: A man is confronted by his former politically-involved self while trying to throw away his past, “only to discover that his rebellious younger self refuses to be trashed without a fight.”
- Lala's Opening: Singer Lala Lamazing Grace is haunted by her former childhood self, an identity she thought she disposed of.
- Permutations: A monologue in which Normal Jean, a young southern girl, explains to the audience how she laid a giant egg which is filled with babies which will fly away.
- The Party: Topsy Washington imagines a huge party in which “Nat Turner sips champagne out of Eartha Kitt’s slipper” and “Aunt Jemima and Angela Davis was in the kitchen sharing a plate of greens and just goin’ off about South Africa.” This exhibit merges the past and present to create Topsy’s fantasy party which defies logic and limitations.

== Original New York cast ==
- Colette Baptiste
- Loretta Devine
- Tommy Hollis
- Reggie Montgomery
- Vickilyn Reynolds
- Jonea Thomas
- Danitra Vance

Credits from the Lortel Archives

== Set design ==
The stage was designed to resemble a white-walled gallery where “the myths and madness of black/Negro/colored Americans are stored.” The walls contained a series of doors, small panels and revolving walls and compartments which allowed actors to retrieve key props and quickly transition from one exhibit to another.

== Music ==
Most of the music for the play was pre recorded. However, live drummer Ron McBee was used in the Git on Board, Permutations and The Party “exhibits.”

== Production history ==
The Colored Museum premiered at Crossroads Theatre of New Jersey in 1986. Within six months, the play found a new home at the Public Theater in New York City. The Colored Museum was later performed at the Royal Court Theater in London, England, beginning July 29, 1987. and in a production by Talawa Theatre Company at the V&A 15–23 October 2011 .

== Academic critique ==
"The Colored Museum simultaneously celebrates, satirizes and subverts the African-American legacy. Wolfe calls his play both, 'an exorcism and a party.' The Colored Museum explores contemporary African-American cultural identity, while, at the same time revisiting and reexamining the African American theatrical and cultural past. According to Wolfe, the legacy of the past must be both embraced and overcome."- Harry J. Elam, The Johns Hopkins University Press Theatre Journal

Theater scholar Jordan Schildcrout discusses "The Gospel According to Miss Roj" in terms of Afrofuturism and queer fantasies of empowerment, noting that "the very title of segment invokes the rhetoric of religious testament and proclaims Miss Roj as a prophet, one who has extraordinary—perhaps even supernatural—powers of insight and wisdom."

== Reviews ==
"George C.Wolfe says the unthinkable, says it with uncompromising wit and leaves the audience, as well as a sacred target, in ruins. The devastated audience, one should note, includes both Blacks and Whites. Mr. Wolfe is the kind of satirist, almost unheard of in today's timid theater, who takes no prisoners." – Frank Rich,

== Quotes to Note ==
Git on Board: “Welcome aboard Flight 1619.” “Please check all baggage.” “You won’t be needing that where you’re going.” “Relax… we’re here to redefine you.” “Enjoy your trip into the New World.”

Cooking with Aunt Ethel: “Now don’t be shy, baby.” “We gonna cook up some history today.” “Mmm-hmm, that’s the flavor of suffering.” “Stir in all that pain… nice and slow.” “Don’t forget to smile for the camera.”

The Photo session: “Hold still. Don’t blink.” “Give me proud… prouder.” “Now smile like you mean it.” “Perfect. That’s the image we want.” “Let’s try that again, but prettier.”

Soldier with a Secret: “I know something they don’t know.” “Death is coming for all of us.” “I’m doing them a favor.” “Better I tell them than the bullets do.” “A secret can weigh more than a rifle.”

Miss Roj: “Baby, I am the night.” “You don’t scare me. I been scared before.” “I walk in here shining.” “This world wasn’t built for girls like me.” “Watch me blaze.”

Hair Piece: “Girl, I am the real you.” — The Straight Wig “Please. She knows she needs me.” — The Afro Wig “I give her options.” — Straight Wig “Natural is beautiful.” — Afro Wig “She can’t leave this house without choosing one of us.” — Stage direction dialogue between the wigs

Symbiosis: “You traded in Afro Sheen for mousse?” “I had to clean myself up… make myself presentable.” “I’m the you you was before you became the you you is.” "You can’t get rid of me that easy.” “You used to dance! Remember that?”

Last Momma on the Couch: “My baby… my beautiful black baby.” — Mama “Mama, I gotta go.” — Son “You ain’t goin’ nowhere.” — Mama “Lord, give me strength.” — Mama “I’m leaving this couch today.”

Lady In the Plaid: “I’m tired of carrying everybody’s baggage.” “I just want to be left alone.” “Everybody wants something from me.” “I’m not your history book.” “I just want some peace.”

Normal Jean Reynolds: “I just want to be special.” “People look at me, but they don’t see me.” “I was supposed to shine.” “They loved the idea of me— not me.” “I keep smiling. That’s what they want.”

Topsy Washington: “I makes revolution sound like dance music.” “I’m your worst nightmare… and your biggest fantasy.” “I’m the integration of the Black experience.” “Everything is possible in Topsy-turvy land.” “All the myths come true here.”
