= Infernal Bridegroom Productions =

Infernal Bridegroom Productions (IBP) was a theater company located in Houston, Texas, formed in 1993 and dissolved in 2007. IBP garnered national attention when it was featured on the cover of American Theatre in September, 2002, for its original play, We Have Some Planes, by Brian Jucha, about the events of September 11. The theater's name is taken from a line in one of its first productions, In the Jungle of Cities by Bertolt Brecht. The line reads, "In my dreams I call him my infernal bridegroom." IBP produced over 60 plays, many of them world premieres.

== About the company ==
The Houston Theater District is the second largest in the United States, after New York, New York, boasting theaters of all sizes, from the LORT Alley Theatre, to midsize theaters such as Stages Repertory Theatre and Main Street Theater, and small nomadic theaters such as Mildred's Umbrella.

Infernal Bridegroom Productions ceased operations in July 2007 due to insurmountable financial difficulties.

Founded in 1993 by Jason Nodler, IBP produced 68 plays and was recognized locally and nationally for its provocative new work, its talented ensemble and its success in attracting non-traditional audiences. Nodler was artistic director until 2003 when he left to travel the country. Associate artistic director Anthony Barilla became artistic director until moving out of the country in 2007. Nodler returned to Houston to found The Catastrophic Theatre with Tamarie Cooper later in that year.

The company's 2006 world premiere rock opera Speeding Motorcycle, created by Nodler in collaboration with acclaimed artist and songwriter Daniel Johnston, received favorable coverage in The New York Times, Art in America, No Depression magazine, the Austin Chronicle and local media outlets. Past works also received positive coverage from American Theatre, Theatre Journal, Stage Directions and the Dallas Morning News.

IBP appeared regularly in the annual Houston Press "Best of Houston" issue, receiving awards for Best Theater Company, New Play, Original Show, Director, Actor, Actress, Set Design, Light Design, Costume Design, Special Effects, Christmas Show and Rock and Roll Theater. And the Houston Chronicle called IBP Houston's best experimental theater.

IBP enjoyed a large and loyal audience as well as regularly attracting out-of-towners that travelled to Houston specifically to see the company's work.

The company was acclaimed for its productions of rarely produced plays by Samuel Beckett, Eugène Ionesco, Bertolt Brecht, Georg Büchner, Jean Genet, Anton Chekhov, Sam Shepard and David Mamet and was the first to introduce Houston audiences to the works of playwrights Suzan-Lori Parks, Maria Irene Fornes, Sarah Kane, Heiner Müller, Wallace Shawn, Charles Mee, Richard Foreman, Mac Wellman and Bernard-Marie Koltès. IBP also attracted national attention for the theatrical premiere of A Soap Opera by Ray Davies and The Kinks and was lauded for its hit production of Broadway musical Guys and Dolls.

But IBP was perhaps best known for the new work it created. Highlights included Fucking A, commissioned by IBP and DiverseWorks Artspace and written and directed by Pulitzer Prize winner Suzan-Lori Parks; We Have Some Planes and Last Rites, conceived and directed by renowned theater artist Brian Jucha; Hide Town, commissioned by the NEA and TCG and written by Lisa D'Amour; Speeding Motorcycle, commissioned by the Rockefeller Foundation and conceived and directed by IBP founding artistic director Jason Nodler in collaboration with Daniel Johnston and the IBP company; Nodler's original plays In the Under Thunderloo, King Ubu is King and Meatbar; company member Troy Schulze's Me-sci-ah, Jerry's World (adapted from the radio shows of cult figure Joe Frank) and Actual Air (adapted from the poetry and music of Silver Jews frontman David Berman); founding company member Tamarie Cooper's 20 Love Songs and the wildly popular Tamalalia series created and directed by Cooper.

Although IBP was in residence at the legendary punk club The Axiom for five years, it spent nine years as a homeless company, performing in warehouses, bars, restaurants, aboard a moving school bus, in an abandoned outdoor shopping center and occasionally in traditional theater spaces such as Stages Repertory Theatre and DiverseWorks.

Music composed and recorded by IBP's resident orchestra, under the direction of former artistic director Anthony Barilla, has enjoyed regular radio play on college stations around the country and on NPR's This American Life. The orchestra also recorded original music for IBP.

== Plays performed ==
=== 1993 ===
- In the Under Thunderloo (World Premiere) by Jason Nodler

=== 1994 ===
- In the Jungle of Cities by Bertolt Brecht
- Rhinoceros by Eugène Ionesco

=== 1995 ===
- The Balcony by Jean Genet
- Endgame by Samuel Beckett
- Marat/Sade by Peter Weiss
- MUD by Maria Irene Fornes

=== 1996 ===
- Othello by William Shakespeare
- Suicide in B Flat by Sam Shepard
- Samuel's Major Problems by Richard Foreman
- Woyzeck by George Büchner
- Guys and Dolls by Frank Loesser / Abe Burrows
- Eddie Goes to Poetry City by Richard Foreman
- The Future is in Eggs by Eugène Ionesco

=== 1997 ===
- The Cherry Orchard by Anton Chekhov
- Waiting for Godot by Samuel Beckett
- Tamalalia 2! (World Premiere) by Tamarie Cooper
- Quartet by Heiner Müller
- Cowboy Mouth by Sam Shepard and Patti Smith
- Camino Real by Tennessee Williams
- Last Rites (World Premiere) by Brian Jucha

=== 1998 ===
- Threepenny Opera by Bertolt Brecht / Kurt Weill
- In The Jungle of Cities by Bertolt Brecht
- Tamalalia 3: The Cocktail Party (World Premiere) by Tamarie Cooper
- Harm's Way by Mac Wellman
- King Ubu is King (World Premiere) by Jason Nodler

=== 1999 ===
- Marie and Bruce by Wallace Shawn
- Tamalalia 4: The Campout (World Premiere) by Tamarie Cooper
- Roberto Zucco by Bernard-Marie Koltès
- Edmond by David Mamet

=== 2000 ===
- Fucking A (World Premiere) by Suzan-Lori Parks
- Tamalalia 2000: The Time Machine (World Premiere) by Tamarie Cooper
- The Danube by Maria Irene Fornes
- Happy Days by Samuel Beckett

=== 2001 ===
- Action and Chicago by Sam Shepard
- Tamalalia 6 (World Premiere) by Tamarie Cooper
- MUD by Maria Irene Fornes

=== 2002 ===
- In the Under Thunderloo by Jason Nodler
- We Have Some Planes (World Premiere) by Brian Jucha
- Tamalalia 7: The Love Show (World Premiere) by Tamarie Cooper
- Phaedra's Love by Sarah Kane
- A Soap Opera by The Kinks

=== 2003 ===
- Actual Air (world premiere) adapted from the poetry of David Berman by Troy Schulze
- The Noblest of Drugs (World Premiere) by Joel Orr
- Meat/BAR (World Premiere) by Jason Nodler
- Tamalalia 8 (World Premiere) by Tamarie Cooper
- Jerry's World (World Premiere) adapted from the radio programs of Joe Frank by Troy Schulze
- Rhinoceros by Eugène Ionesco

=== 2004 ===
- Symphony of Rats by Richard Foreman
- The Hotel Play by Wallace Shawn
- Tamalalia 9 (World Premiere) by Tamarie Cooper
- Trappakeepa & Girth And Topical by Lindsay Kayser: a co-production with Gypsy Baby Theater
- Me-sci-ah (World Premiere) by Troy Schulze
- BAAL by Bertolt Brecht

=== 2005 ===
- Me-sci-ah (The Second Coming) by Troy Schulze
- Medea by Euripides, adapted by Charlie Scott
- Night Just Before the Forests by Bernard-Marie Koltès
- Tamalalia X: The Greatest Hits Show (World Premiere) by Tamarie Cooper
- What You've Done by Aaron Landsman: a co-production with DiverseWorks Artspace and Project Row Houses
- Full Circle by Charles L. Mee

=== 2006 ===
- Uncle Vanya by Anton Chekhov
- Daniel Johnston's Speeding Motorcycle by Jason Nodler with music by Daniel Johnston
- Microscope Maintenance & Repair by Lindsay Kayser
- Daniel Johnston's Speeding Motorcycle by Jason Nodler with music by Daniel Johnston (encore)
- Hide Town by Lisa D'Amour

=== 2007 ===
- 365 Days/365 Plays by Suzan Lori-Parks
- 20 Love Songs (World Premier) by Tamarie Cooper

== Awards ==
=== 2000 ===
- Houston Press: Best Designer: Devlin Browning, for Edmond
- Houston Press: Best Director: Jason Nodler for Edmond
- Houston Press: Best Christmas Show: Edmond

=== 2001 ===
- Houston Press: Best Designer: Steven K. Barnett for The Danube

=== 2002 ===
- Houston Press: Best Director: Brian Jucha for We Have Some Planes
- Houston Press: Best Actress (Readers' Choice): Tamarie Cooper
- Houston Press: Best Actor (Readers' Choice): Troy Schulze
- Houston Press: Best Original Show: We Have Some Planes

=== 2003 ===
- Houston Press: Best Rock and Roll Theater: A Soap Opera

=== 2004 ===
- Houston Chronicle: Best Experimental Theater
- Houston Press: Best Set Design: Symphony of Rats
- Houston Press: Best Original Show: Jerry's World

=== 2005 ===
- Houston Chronicle: Best Rebel with a Cause: Troy Schulze
- Houston Press: Best Original Show: Tamalalia X: The Greatest Hist Show
- Houston Press: Best Performance Space: The Axiom
- Houston Press: Best Director: Charlie Scott for Medea
- Houston Press: Best Production: Medea

=== 2006 ===
- Houston Press: Best Original Show: Speeding Motorcycle
