= Reggie Montgomery =

American director (1947–2002)

- Reggie Montgomery, year unknown
- Born: September 15, 1947; Tallahassee, Florida, US
- Died: January 13, 2002 (aged 54); New York City, US
- Education: Florida A&M University, BS; Trinity University, MFA, Ringling Bros. and Barnum & Bailey Clown College
- Known for: First African-American clown in Ringling Bros. and Barnum & Bailey Circus, acting

Reginald Alexander Montgomery (Sep 15, 1947 – Jan 13, 2002) was an American clown, actor and director. He was best known as the first African-American clown to perform in Ringling Bros. and Barnum & Bailey Circus, though he spent only a year of his career doing so.

== Early life ==
Montgomery was born in 1947 in Tallahassee, Florida, and had two siblings. His parents wanted him to become an English teacher. In high school, he studied acting and played touch football. He went to Florida A&M University and studied drama, graduating in 1968.

Speaking to his childhood experience, he said, "Especially being of color, I am always figuring out a way to survive in the world and in the theater...I grew up in Tallahassee, Florida in the 50s where people were still being lynched".

As a child, Montgomery had a speech impediment, which required surgery. In part to help with his speech impediment, when he was 6 years old he was enrolled in a theater program at Florida A&M University, run by Sheppard Randolph Edmunds, founder of the first Black theater educational program at Dillard University in 1936, and sometimes known as "the dean of Black academic theater". Montgomery stayed in the program for 8 years.

After later attending as an adult and graduating from Florida A&M University in 1968, Montgomery studied at Ringling Bros. and Barnum & Bailey Clown College, the first year of the school's existence. The dean of the school, Mel Miller, saw Montgomery in a local stage production, and invited Montgomery to apply. Of 1,000 applicants, Montgomery was one of 30 accepted.

He studied under Otto Griebling and Emmett Kelley, learning "acrobatic exercises--tumbles, flops and rolls...[and] also studied elements of visual comedy, along with practice work in pantomime." He expressed not liking circus when he had seen it 10 years prior, but "decided to give it a try" after being invited to apply. Drawn to performance, his parents expressed a preference for him to be an English teacher (he did, in fact, work as a substitute English teacher at Florida's Sarasota Junior High while attending Clown College "to earn 'bread-and-butter' money").

He later earned a master's degree in fine arts from Trinity University in San Antonio, TX.

== Clowning ==
In 1969, he attended the Ringling Bros. and Barnum & Bailey Clown College, founded the year before. He was the only Black man in his classes, and Ringling's first Black clown. During the six weeks of clown college he also worked as a substitute English teacher. He did not want to appear in white face, and with the agreement of the circus managers he applied a more scaled down clown make up.

He stayed with Ringling for a year, saying that

We've got people from more than 18 foreign countries. But nobody allows himself to get uptight about Communism or international boundaries or race. Everybody just helps everybody else. And like things really jell.

In 1969, after graduating from clown college, he toured as a clown with Ringling Brothers and Barnum & Bailey Circus, continuing to refuse to do white-face, saying to Ebony magazine in 1969: "My own paint job's good enough."

== Acting and directing ==
In the 1970s, Montgomery established the Minority Repertory Theater in Dallas, TX together with actress Irma P. Hall, where he worked with Paul Baker at the Dallas Theater Center. While in Dallas, he portrayed Ebenezer Scrooge in A Christmas Carol. He later moved to Los Angeles, CA to further pursue acting. In 1982, he moved to New York.

In 1986, he was part of George C. Wolfe's play The Colored Museum, where he played several characters. His theater work included Suzan-Lori Parks's The America Play and In the Blood, as well as plays by Zora Neale Hurston. Additionally, he worked as a director and acting coach. Montgomery's film and TV roles included Matlock (TV series), Law & Order, Malcolm X, and Joe the King.

In theater, Montgomery staged Spunk (1990), as well as the Broadway production of Mule Bone (1991), Kia Corthron's Digging Eleven, I Ain't Yo Uncle: The New Jack Revisionist Uncle Tom's Cabin, The Colored Museum, and ...Love, Langston at Hartford Stage, where he also served for 2 years as an associate artistic director. Montgomery previously appeared in some of George C. Wolfe's original productions of Back Alley Tales, including the aforementioned Spunk, in which he played a pimp, and The Colored Museum. His roles in The Colored Museum included "a series of satirical sketches about black American history" playing various characters, including "Walter-Lee-Beau-Willy, a purposely stereotypical black man" and "Miss Roj...a transvestite in white go-go boots and orange patio pants". He also performed on Broadway, acting in The Green Bird.

For his performances in Wolfe's plays, he won the Audelco Best Actor Award, at the New York Shakespeare Festival. Upon meeting Montgomery, Wolfe writes in a tribute article memorializing the artist:

"Reggie Montgomery was mad with talent and intensity and vulnerability and integrity. As he talked, his eyes flashed with rage or joy or whatever he was feeling in that moment. There was, quite simply, no space, no distance, no on-and-off switch to Reggie and his artistry."

In 2001, he portrayed James Baldwin in Wesley Brown's A Prophet Among Them, his final acting credit.

From 1995 to 1999, Montgomery was an associate professor of theater arts at Trinity College in Hartford, CT. While at Trinity, Montgomery wrote and directed many productions including, The Suburban Violence Project, Reggie Montgomery Directs, as well as Up Front and Personal, a collection of stories written by his Trinity Students during Montgomery's multicultural workshop.

In 2000, Montgomery directed Suzzanne Douglas in Lady Day at the Emerson Bar and Grill, at the George Street Playhouse in New Brunswick, NJ. He previously worked with Douglas in an Actors Studio production of The Obeah Man, a musical adaptation of Molière's The Doctor in Spite of Himself.

Montgomery also taught acting at the Alvin Ailey School of Dance and at the American Musical and Dramatic Arts Academy in New York.

== Personal life ==
Montgomery was a close friend of fellow actor Tommy Hollis.

== Death ==
Montgomery was found dead in his New York City apartment on January 13, 2002. He died of natural causes after "a long illness". He was survived by a brother and a sister. He was buried in Tallahassee, Florida.

His frequent collaborator, George C. Wolfe, said:

I don't necessarily know the true meaning of the word "artist," but I do know when I'm in the presence of one. And from that very first meeting I knew Reggie was a great artist: A heroic spirit, a subversive jester and a fierce warrior.

== Theatrical performances ==
Year	Title	Role
1970s	Back Alley Tales	
1970s	The Caucasian Chalk Circle	Azdak
1970s	A Christmas Carol	Ebenezer Scrooge
1984	Short Eyes	El Raheem
1985	Raisin in the Sun	Walter Lee Younger
1985	Twelfth Night	Antonio
1986	The Tempest	Stephano
1986-87	The Colored Museum	Model, Miss Roj, Willy, Kid
1988	The Colored Museum	Model, Miss Roj, Willy, Kid
1989	Measure for Measure	Lucio
1990	Spunk: Three Tales by Zora Neale Hurston	Sykes, Sweetback, Voice, One
1991	Mule Bone	Lige Mosley
1991	Black Eagles	Buddy
1994	The America Play	Foundling Father
1994	The Merry Wives of Windsor	Hugh Evans
1999	In the Blood	Baby, Reverend D
2001	A Prophet Among Them	

Media file of Reggie Montgomery performing in The Colored Museum. This is one of Montgomery's most notable works, awarding him an Audelco.

== Directing ==
Year	Title
1995	Spunk: Three Tales by Zora Neale Hurston
1995	I Ain't Yo' Uncle: The New Jack Revisionist Uncle Tom's Cabin
1997	The Colored Museum
1997	Thunder Knocking on the Door
1998	...Love Langston
1999	Digging Eleven
2000-01	The Piano Lesson
2001	Lady Day at Emerson Grill
	Shades of Black and Brown

== Filmography ==
Year	Title	Role(s)	Medium	Notes
1982	They Call Me Bruce?	Young Black Man	Film	
1987	Weeds	Rabble Rouser	Film	
1988	Matlock	Mr. Bunabi	Television	1 episode
1991	Great Performances	Miss Roj, Walter-Lee-Beau-Willie-Jones	Television	1 episode
1991	Hangin' with the Homeboys	Rasta	Film	
1992	Malcolm X	Dick Jones	Film	
1993	Ghost Writer	Darryl Thomas	Television	2 episodes
1995	New York Undercover	McNamara	Television	2 episodes
1992-1996	Law & Order	Leon Monroe, Dawkins, Francis Awe	Television	3 episodes
1997	Oz	Black History Teacher	Television	1 episode
1999	Joe the King	Andy	Film	

== Video games ==
Year	Title	Role(s)	Notes
2001	AquaNox	Lieutenant Boston Harper, Iwan King	Voice actor
