= In the Blood (play) =

Play by Suzan-Lori Parks

In The Blood
- Written by: Suzan-Lori Parks
- Characters: Hester, La Negrita; Jabber; Bully; Trouble; Beauty; Baby; Amiga Gringa; The Doctor; Welfare Lady; Reverend D. Chilli
- Original language: English
- Genre: Tragedy
- Setting: New York

Premiere
- Date premiered: November 1999
- Place premiered: Joseph Papp Public Theater; New York City

In The Blood is a play written by Suzan-Lori Parks which premiered at The Joseph Papp Public Theater in 1999. Parks wanted to create a play based on Nathaniel Hawthorne's 1850 novel The Scarlet Letter and borrowed many aspects of her play from the novel. She originally wanted to call the play Fucking A, but scrapped the idea. She later wrote the story based on the main character from The Scarlet Letter, and turned the story into more modern era, and changed the title to In The Blood. She later wrote a different play that she did title Fucking A.

== Productions ==
In The Blood, presented by The Public Theater, originally opened at the Susan Stein Shiva Theater on November 2, 1999 (previews), officially on November 22, 1999, and closed on December 19, 1999. Directed by David Esbjornson, the cast featured Charlayne Woodard as Hester, Rob Campbell, Gail Grate, Bruce MacVittie, Reggie Montgomery and Dierdre O'Connell.

The play was a finalist for the 2000 Pulitzer Prize for Drama. She later won the Pulitzer Prize for another play, Topdog/Underdog.

In The Blood was performed at the Edison Theater in Los Angeles on July 18, 2003. The play was directed by Laura Marchant.

Schaeberle Studio Theatre at Pace University produced a well-received production of show in the fall of 2004. The week-long run was sold out.

Signature Theatre Company performed In The Blood from August 29, 2017 to October 8, 2017 alongside Fucking A (also by Suzan-Lori Parks and inspired by The Scarlet Letter).

The University of Georgia Department of Theatre and Film studies most recently produced In The Blood from February 15, 2019, through February 24, 2019. This production was directed by guest artist Martin Damien Wilkins.

The University of Kansas produced In the Blood during its 2019/20 season, directed by Timmia Hearn.

Most recently, the University of San Francisco produced In the Blood in October 2022. The production was directed by SF Hip Hop artist Paul S. Flores and choreographed by Robert Moses.

== Plot ==
In The Blood tells the story about a mother, Hester, and her five children in which the father is not around. She is trying to help someone to make her children's lives better while living in poverty. She has a reputation in the town as a "slut" on her, which is affecting her chance at making a better life for her kids. Hester seizes the opportunity to receive help from her children's fathers, with hopes that one may help them. The play moves to other characters' stories (confessions) such as the doctor, welfare, and her friend, who is involved with Hester's struggling predicament.

== Plot analysis ==
In The Blood consists of two acts and nine scenes, and is of a linear plot style. While written in the twentieth century, the play follows standard playwriting rules of the nineteenth century. Well-made plays followed the formulas of Freytag's pyramid, which, according to David Rush, consists of seven parts for the plot structure. The plot features the following:

State of Equilibrium- Hester needs help raising her five bastard children, while in poverty.

Inciting Incident- Amiga Gringa advises her to seek help from her children's fathers.

Point of Attack of the Major Dramatic Question- Will Hester find help for her children?

Rising Action- Hester finds that Reverend D. and Chilli, two fathers, may help her.

Climax- Reverend D., her last hope, rejected her and called her a "slut."

Resolution- Out of anger, Hester kills her oldest son for calling her a "slut."

New State of Equilibrium- Hester is in jail, and can no longer help her children.

== Characters Guide ==
=== Hester's Family ===
Hester, La Negrita- The main protagonist of the play, and mother of five bastard children. She struggles to find help from anyone for her children in poverty. Hester was involved with other characters that owe her money. She is shown as a person who is willing to give herself to others when they are in need, but, in return, she only receives pocket dollar bills. She attempts to work hard and make small profit, but becomes more influenced by her friend, Amiga Gringa. Though she tries her best to help her children, she winds up killing her son, and ends up in jail.

Jabber- Hester's oldest son. He is thirteen years old and is considered slow by his mother, although knows how to read and write better than she. He still has bed-wetting problems. Jabber is Chilli's son, and could be considered Hester's favorite. He is later killed for talking to his mother about the word "slut."

Bully- Hester's oldest daughter. She is twelve years old and considers herself a "good" person. Bully has more masculine characteristics, and in one scene, she compares the hairs of her private area with her brothers.

Trouble- Hester's middle son. He is ten years-old and has a mischievous nature. He said that he found a police club on the street, but was chased by the police for it. Hester holds onto the club and uses it later against Jabber.

Beauty- Hester's youngest daughter. She is seven years old and considered a snitch from her mother and Trouble. She ran away when Hester was beating Jabber to death.

Baby- Hester's youngest son. He is two years old and the son of Reverend D.

== Character analysis ==
Most of the characters in the play are in poverty and all affected by Hester's past. Also known as confessions, Hester has had many sexual experiences with many characters in the play. Hester also presents her own thoughts near the end. One of the confessions that seem most evident is the Doctor's confession about how Hester had relations with him while he was in despair of being alone. The Welfare lady's confession entails that she has had more experience while having alone time with Hester. Reverend D's confession is how Hester's predicament turned him toward God. Chilli's confession is reflecting on young love and how times change. Finally, Hester's confession is about men's quick love and that she should have thousands of bad children.

== Genre ==
The genre of In The Blood fits with classic tragedy, similar to Greek tragedy, unlike many of Suzan-Lori Parks' works that are usually drama. The play borrows elements from other classic genres, but not entirely of them. The characters are portrayed as either below or equal to us, as Hester plays the role of the tragic hero. She has the "tragic spirit", or hamartia, when she feels responsible for the troubles she has caused and can't help it.

== Style ==
The style of the play is based on realism. Elements such as the linear plot, immediate surroundings, character-driven story, and the objective point-of-view from the author connects to the element of realism. Overall, the play has a representational form. The audience is not involved with the story, but to interpret what they are seeing.

== Language ==
The use of language in the play has different denotations and connotations for most characters. Characters who are poorly educated, like Hester, Jabber, and Amiga Gringa use less complex words and syntax. The more educated characters like the Doctor and Reverend D. use a more formal language.

== Theme/Ideas ==
The central theme of the play is about society's oppression of the people in poverty and those who take advantage of one another. Most of the characters who Hester's confides to taking advantage of her. Characters like the Doctor, Reverend, and Welfare already have homes and families, but don't put much effort into helping Hester and her children out of poverty. The meaning behind the title "In The Blood", is that Hester's own state of mind on how the adulterer, poor, and reckless person is in her blood. The idea of the hand of fate is symbolized by the eclipse, giving some implications that Hester's fate is inescapable and will live with the label she has in her blood.

== Spectacle ==
The production of the play is very limited and sparse. The playwright had noted that the setting needed to reflect the poverty of the world. Characters of the play interact very little with the scenery, but is shown to give the audience some sense of where this is happening. The audience is grabbed by the opening scene with the word "slut" written on the wall.

== Music ==
The only song in the play appears in scene 7, called "The Looking Song." The music and lyrics were written by Suzan-Lori Parks.
