= Oskar Eustis =

American artistic director (born 1958)

- Born: July 31, 1958 (age 68)

Oskar Eustis (born July 31, 1958) is a director, dramaturg, and artistic director for theaters around the United States. He has been the Artistic Director at the Public Theater in New York City since 2005, and is set to step down from the position in 2028.

== Early life ==
Eustis grew up in Minnesota. His parents, Warren Eustis, a district attorney and an official of the Democratic Party in Minnesota, and Doris Marquit, a women's studies professor, divorced when he was ten. He graduated from high school at age 15 and moved to New York City, briefly attended New York University, and then co-founded the Red Wing Theater Company. After working in Switzerland, he moved to San Francisco, and started working at the Eureka Theatre Company. He met his wife, Laurie, at the Mark Taper Forum.

== Career ==
Eustis was the artistic director at the Trinity Repertory Company in Providence, Rhode Island from 1994 to 2005. From 1989 to 1994 he was the associate artistic director for the Mark Taper Forum in Los Angeles. He was the resident director and dramaturg for the Eureka Theatre Company in San Francisco, California from 1981 to 1986 and then artistic director from 1986 to 1989. He started the Red Wing Company when he was sixteen with Stephan Muller.

While at the Eureka Theatre, he commissioned Tony Kushner’s Angels in America, and directed its world premiere at the Mark Taper Forum. In 2019, he directed Suzan-Lori Parks's play White Noise.

He was a professor of theatre, speech and dance at Brown University, where he founded and chaired the Trinity Rep/Brown University Consortium for professional theater training. He also served on the faculty of the Bread Loaf School of English at Middlebury College.

Eustis is a professor of dramatic writing and arts and public policy at New York University, and has held professorships at UCLA, Middlebury College, and Brown University. He also teaches a small seminar at Saint Ann's School (Brooklyn).

=== The Public Theater ===
Eustis has been the Artistic Director of the Public Theater since 2005. At the Public, Eustis directed the New York premieres of Rinne Groff's Compulsion and The Ruby Sunrise, Lawrence Wright's The Human Scale, and the 2008 Shakespeare in the Park production of Hamlet. At Trinity Repertory Company he directed the world premiere of Paula Vogel's The Long Christmas Ride Home in 2003 and Tony Kushner’s Homebody/Kabul in 2002, both recipients of the Elliot Norton Award for Outstanding Production.

Since the COVID-19 pandemic, he has faced criticism for the magnitude of his pay package – the New York Times reported it as "a salary of $898,000 and benefits," making Eustis one of the highest paid theater leaders in the country, despite layoffs at the Public happening at the same time.

In 2026, Eustis announced that he would be stepping down from his position as artistic director of the Public Theater on his 70th birthday – July 31, 2028.

== Filmography ==
Year	Title	Medium	Role	Notes
2007	Working in the Theatre	TV series	Himself	Episode 29.6
2010	Made Here	TV series documentary	Himself	
2011	Stage Left: A Story of Theatre in San Francisco	Documentary	Himself	
2011-2012	Charlie Rose	TV series	Himself	2 episodes
2012	Gossip Girl	TV series	Himself	Episode 6.2
2013	Dangerous Acts Starring the Unstable Elements of Belarus	Documentary	Himself	
