= Cándido Tirado =

Puerto Rican playwright (born 1955)

Cándido Tirado (born 1955) is a Puerto Rican playwright who moved to the Bronx from Caguas, Puerto Rico at age 11. Tirado is currently a resident playwright for Teatro Vista in New York City. In the United States his works have been produced by theater companies such as Teatro Vista, Puerto Rican Traveling Theatre, and the Goodman Theatre. His works have also been produced outside of the United States, in places such as the Dominican Republic and the Canary Islands. Tirado has taken part in directing and writing for INTAR theater's annual one-minute play festival.

Tirado is married to Carmen Rivera who is also a playwright. Together they co-wrote the award-winning musical Celia: The Life and Music of Celia Cruz which has been performed in places such as Puerto Rico, Chicago, and Miami. Along with his wife, Cándido Tirado established a touring company that takes social issues to schools called Educational Play Productions. This touring company produces shows that are meant to be told in the voices of the young people they speak to, which are elementary school students, middle school students, and high schoolers. These works are produced to showcase the choices and the consequences that inner-city youth are confronted with in response to their choices. Tirado has also directed a couple of plays written by Rivera including The Fall of Rafael Trujillo and Julia de Burgos: Child of Water. Other plays Tirado has directed include Growing up Gonzales, Within the Skin of Saints, and his very own Fish Men, First Class, Momma’s Boyz, and so on.

One of Tirado's goals in writing his plays is to get his audience angry about the issues that are going on in today's world and for them to leave the theater feeling empowered. Tirado's focus is not to put the spotlight specifically on Latinos, but to leave people with an understanding that "Latino" is becoming "the center of world cultures—African, [Indigenous,] European and Asian—because for [him] Latino culture is rooted in all these other cultures". Tirado's publications are as follows: The Chess Plays, Fish Men and King Without a Castle: NoPassport, First Class: Arte Publico Recent Puerto Rican Theater, Five Plays from New York; Penguin, Mentor Books; Some People Have All the Luck: Nuestro New York: An Anthology of Puerto Rican Playwrights; Ilka-The Dream: Positive/Negative – Women of color and HIV and AIDS, Aunt Lute Publishers. Some of Tirado's works include When Natural Calls, Abuelo, The Missing Colors of the Rainbow, Hey There Black Cat, and La Canción.

== Screenwriting ==
Tirado's screenwriting background includes being a staff writer for six episodes of the TV series East WillyB in 2013. He was also a staff writer for the show Ghostwriter

== Accomplishments ==
Tirado's accomplishments include four fellowships from the New York Foundation for the Arts (NYFA), an Edgerton Foundation New Play Award (TCG), and an HOLA award for Best Musical for his musical Celia: The Life and Music of Celia Cruz (2008). Tirado's play Two Diamonds was nominated and became a finalist for the National New Play Network's (NNPN) National Showcase of New Plays. Cándido was nominated for a Humanitas award for the show Ghostwriter.
