= The Catastrophic Theatre =

Theater in Houston

The Catastrophic Theatre was founded in 2007 by Houston theatre veterans Jason Nodler and Tamarie Cooper. The theatre is considered a leader in the city's experimental and original performance scene.

The Catastrophic Theatre has received two MAP Grants. The first, in 2009 supported a musical production, Bluefinger. The Theatre received a 2011 MAP Grant to support production an original play by Mickle Maher. In 2013, the theatre was awarded the American Theatre Wing's National Theatre Company Grant.
