= Tamarie Cooper =

American dramatist

Tamarie Cooper (born September 9, 1970) is an actress and playwright in Houston, Texas who is best known for her work with Infernal Bridegroom Productions and the Catastrophic Theatre. She currently serves as co-artistic director of the Catastrophic Theatre. She attended Houston's High School for the Performing and Visual Arts.

Cooper is known for the semi-autobiographical musicals she produces annually. Her first, Tamalalia!, was performed on stage at The Orange Show in 1996.
