= The America Play =

1993 two-act play by Suzan-Lori Parks

- Original language: English
- Written by: Suzan-Lori Parks

Premiere
- Date: 1994
- Place: Yale Repertory Theatre

The America Play is a two-act play that was written by Suzan-Lori Parks in 1993. The play follows an African-American gravedigger who loves and resembles Abraham Lincoln, so much so that he also works as a Lincoln impersonator. For this reason he is referred to throughout the play as the "Foundling Father." As an impersonator he charges his customers a penny to take part in a reenactment of Lincoln's assassination.

== Productions ==
The America Play ran at Yale Repertory Theatre in January 1994, directed by Liz Diamond, with Reggie Montgomery as The Foundling Father. The play was then produced Off-Broadway at the Public Theater from February 22, 1994, to March 27, 1994.

The America Play was produced at the Theater@Boston Court from October 14, 2006, to November 19, 2006. The play was directed by Nancy Keystone and featured Harold Surratt as The Foundling Father.

== Characters ==
=== The Foundling Father ===
The protagonist of Act One, the foundling father is a black grave digger who bears a strong resemblance to Abraham Lincoln. He is "tall and thinly built just like the Great Man". He is known to "dig his graves quickly and neatly". He is frequently referred to as the "lesser known" as opposed to the Great Man Abraham Lincoln. He is married to Lucy and is the father of Brazil. His experience at the Great Hole of History on his honeymoon shapes his life and introduces a summoning to head West and dig a replica. He recreates scenes from Lincoln’s life, especially the assassination by John Wilkes Booth. According to his wife, "digging was his livelihood, but fakin was his calling".

=== Lucy ===
Lucy is the wife of the Foundling Father, and she is also the mother of Brazil. The stage directions of Act Two describe Lucy as circulating with an ear trumpet. Lucy is a confidante, keeping the secrets of the dying. For example, she kept Bram Price Senior's deathbed secret of wearing lifts in his shoes for 19 years. She became confidante because as a child she happened to be in the same room as her uncle when he died. Her family wanted to know what his last words were, but he had not said anything. However, her family believed he had and that she was "holding on to thuh words" and so they announced that she was a Confidence.

=== Brazil ===
Brazil is the son of the Foundling Father and Lucy, and his role in the family mourning business is to be the weeper and moaner. He was taught to wail on "the 100th anniversary of the founding of our country." Then, in the following years he learned "the weep", "the sob", "the moan", and finally the "gnash". At the replica Great Hole of History in Act Two, Brazil is digging for items to place in thuh Hall of Wonders.

== Setting ==
The Replica of the Great Hole

The Replica of the Great Hole is the name of the hole that appears, physically, in this play. The Replica of the Great Hole is used as a setting for both acts one and two along with the lines: "The hole is an exact replica of the Great Hole of History."[1] This hole was dug by the Foundling Father and left to his wife, Lucy, and his son, Brazil. In Act II, Brazil describes The Great Hole of History as a honeymoon destination – where the Foundling Father and his wife Lucy vacationed – featuring a giant hole and daily parades. The Foundling Father, introduced in Act I as a gravedigger with an uncanny resemblance to Abraham Lincoln, began his Great Hole replica and then left it to pursue his career as a Lincoln-look-alike.

In the play, The Replica of the Great Hole is simply a physical hole that serves as an impetus for the dialogue between Lucy and Brazil that illuminates the earlier life of the Foundling Father.

== Structure ==
Act I is simply titled "Lincoln Act", and focuses on the Foundling Father. The majority of this act is in the form of a monologue, and is performed by him. This act also shows the reenactment of the assassination over and over again, with the Foundling Father as Lincoln, and the customers as John Wilkes Booth.

Act II is titled "Hall of Wonders", and is from the perspective of the other two main characters: the Foundling Father’s ex-wife, Lucy, and his son, Brazil. The second act is largely a dialogue between the two characters, and provides insight into the back story of the Foundling Father.

The two acts of this play are very different in terms of structure. The first act is one section, mostly monologue, and focused on one character. The second act is broken down into seven sections (Big Bang, Echo, Archeology, Echo, Spadework, Echo, and The Great Beyond), mostly dialogue, and is still focused on the Foundling Father, but through the eyes and perspective of Lucy and Brazil. They are the main characters in this act, and it is through their dialogue that the audience learns more about the Foundling Father. The sections of the second act vary in length; however, the three sections titled "Echo" are the shortest.

== Style ==
Parks uses a range of stylistic elements in crafting this play, one of which being repetition and revision, which she refers to as Rep & Rev. She describes Rep & Rev as "a concept integral to the Jazz aesthetic in which the composer or performer will write or play a musical phrase once and again and again; etc. – with each revisit the phrase slightly revised." The sub-sections in the second act entitled "Echo", are a perfect example of this, as they appear in an alternating pattern between the other sections, are titled with a word and concept that is repeated many times throughout the play, and with each appearance an enhanced version of the meaning is introduced.

Rep & rev is a sonic device, one that is found in music and in ancient oral traditions, and is unique to Parks' writing in that it plays with sound and how certain sounds affect the way something is read, or even performed. Parks states, "Through reading lots I've realized how much the idea of Repetition and Revision is an integral part of the African and African-American literary and oral traditions. I am most interested in words and how they impact on actors and directors and how those folks physicalize those verbal aberrations. How does this Rep & Rev – a literal incorporation of the past – impact on the creation of the theatrical experience?"

Another prominent element of Parks' style is its close relationship to music. Parks has discussed how heavily her writing has been influenced by music, and how she considers musical methods and how she might incorporate those into her writing. Musical elements of Parks' writing are found in the use of rep & rev, etymology, and what Parks calls a rest, or spell.

== Symbolism ==
The Great Hole of History

Parks' choice to write The America Play in the format of a play comes from her belief that "a play is a blueprint of an event: a way of creating and rewriting history." In writing The American Play, she is "rewriting the Time Line – creating history where it is and always was but has not yet been divined." With this in mind, the metaphor of The Great Hole of History becomes clearer. Parks believes that history is written by those in power and, thus, much of African American history – especially the numerous stories of historical strife – have been excluded from the canon and are largely overlooked. The Great Hole of History is the exclusion of African American history from the canon of American History. Parks parodies this hole by creating it into a celebratory attraction. The parades of dead persons that walk by in the parade are all people that have contributed to the creation and suppression necessary to produce the history known today – Amerigo Vespucci, Marcus Garvey, Ferdinand and Isabella, Mary Queen of thuh Scots, Tarzan King of thuh Apes, Washington Jefferson Harding, Millard Fillmore and Mistufer Columbus. The international presence in this lineup is a call from Parks to the idea of colonization and The Great Hole of History being a hole that represents all those who were marginalized throughout history (not just those in American history).

There is a parallel, too, between The Great Hole of History and the Foundling Father himself. The Foundling Father, like The Great Hole, is empty of his own contents and open to being filled with the content of others. The Foundling Father’s own personality is never described in the text, only his role as an Abraham Lincoln impersonator (or "a faker", in the words of Lucy), because he is a hole being filled with the properties of another. He is the human equivalent to The Great Hole of History that is being filled with the personas of people and events that are one-sided and incomplete. Because all history is biased, Parks wrote this play so that she could “make history.” She does this, in part, by criticizing and drawing attention to The Great Hole in History.

Be Your Own Person, Write Your Own Story

Parks never gave a real name for the main character, he was only ever referred to as the Foundling Father or the Lesser Known to the Great Man. What she was trying to show here was that he was not supposed to be given a name in the play because he was living in someone else's shoes(Abraham Lincoln). Throughout the whole play, all he did was act as Abraham Lincoln and that is what brought him fame and wealth. He was never once his own person except for when he was a gravedigger with his wife and son. One of Parks' points of making this play was to be able to make her own history and it connects to the main character because he could have made his own story if he lived his own life as a gravedigger with his family. She also made it confusing to readers so that they are able to make their own ideas of what she was trying to portray in this play. This allows readers to use their imagination to fabricate their own meaning of the play. Parks was trying to show her audience that if the Foundling Father lived his own life instead of trying to live someone else's, he could have been the "Great Man" of his own story.

== Historical allusions ==
=== Abraham Lincoln ===
Referred to in the play as the Great Man, Parks frequently alludes to the historical realities and myths about Lincoln. Like the Great Man, the Foundling Father is "tall and thinly built" with long legs and large hands and feet. He even takes to wearing a false wart like Lincoln’s wart. There are frequent allusions to Lincoln’s beard as the Foundling Father keeps several beards in a box with the initials A.L. on the lid. He also complains that wearing a stovepipe hat inside is historically inaccurate but that people don't like it when Lincoln appears hatless. The play references the myth of Lincoln’s log cabin as a "shape around which their entire lives and their posterity shapes itself." Most prominently, the play continually repeats the scene of Lincoln’s assassination by John Wilkes Booth as the Foundling Father allows people to shoot him and reenact the historic moment. The words of the Gettysburg Address and references to the hole in Lincoln’s head from the shooting also dominate the historical allusions made. Supposed quotations from the assassination that are quoted and repeated in the play include:

- "Emergency oh, Emergency, please put the Great Man in the ground" (Supposedly what Mary Todd Lincoln says after her husband dies)
- "You sockdologizing old man-trap!" (Supposedly the funny line from Our American Cousin; Lincoln was laughing at this line when he was shot)
- "Useless, Useless" (Supposedly the last words of John Wilkes Booth)
- "Thus to the tyrants!" (Supposedly John Wilkes Booth’s words after he shot Lincoln)
- "The South is avenged!" (Other supposed words of Booth as he killed Lincoln)
- "Now he belongs to the ages" (Supposedly the words of Edwin Stanton, Secretary of War, when Lincoln died)
- "They've killed the president" (Supposedly what Mary Todd Lincoln said after Lincoln was shot)

== Careers ==
=== Impersonator ===
The America Play tells the story of an Abraham Lincoln impersonator, known as the Foundling Father, reenacting the night Lincoln was assassinated. Customers come and pay as little as they want to act like John Wilkes Booth or anybody else the customer chooses to portray, and pretend to assassinate the Lincoln impersonator. The Foundling Father was fascinated by Abraham Lincoln, saying Lincoln was his "favorite", even referring to Lincoln as "the Great Man". He was especially interested in the last days of Lincoln’s life, particularly his last show, deeds, and even his last laughs (180). The Foundling Father is only concerned with these specific moments in Lincoln’s life because he wants to perfect them for his impersonation act. Before the Foundling Father became this established impersonator, he was a gravedigger, and he is so ashamed of that being his past that he refers to his old self as "the Lesser Known", which speaks to his embarrassment of being someone so simple and ordinary. and that he so desperately wanted to be someone other than himself, someone great.

=== Gravedigger ===
The first act of the play is just of the Foundling Father and his customers reenacting the assassination, but the second act of the play focuses on his wife and son. The wife, Lucy, and son, Brazil, are totally separated from the Foundling Father; they do not see his performance but only hear it off stage. The wife and son are gravediggers as well, they took up the trade after the impersonator left and became the Foundling Father. Brazil makes a comment referring to his father’s career path, saying: "Diggin was his livelihood but fakin was his callin" (179). Lucy, is constantly telling Brazil of the man his father was and what his favorite things were before he became the Foundling Father. But Brazil always responds with, "I was only 5." Lucy is not necessarily quizzing Brazil, but wants to reiterate that what his father did for work before as a gravedigger was nothing to be ashamed of, contrary to how his father feels about grave digging, and this impersonating work was not the best decision. The Foundling Father was good at digging graves, he dug them fast and well, calling him a "natural" at it. The Foundling Father is dead to them, because he left them to pursue this reenactment career and has not seen his family in thirty years. Towards the end of the play, Lucy and Brazil go to see the Foundling Father after he performs one last reenactment, he is preparing to go to the "Great Beyond". He is not physically going to the afterlife, but the "Great Beyond" is more a metaphor; because the Foundling Father gets up and walks into a coffin where his son then parades his dead body around. The impersonations end with the Foundling Father, Brazil does not pick up where his father left off because his mother was constantly telling him that there was nothing wrong with being a gravedigger.

== Suzan-Lori Parks ==
Parks is a Pulitzer Prize winner and a MacArthur "Genius" Grant recipient, who explains that she writes based on listening to the voices that speak to her and doing what is in her heart. These voices become a catalyst to her writing. The significance is that the literal voices she hears is signified in the play itself. Parks pushes and pulls from understanding of the African-American ancestral past versus exploring their own. This is done in a way to interact with the past and the consequential suffering from a distance. Parks play also demonstrates how the process of history creates a dominant class of those who are known, and a section for those who belong in history.
