= Carmen Rivera =

American playwright, teacher and producer

- Born: October 1, 1964 (age 61); New York City, NY
- Education: New York University (BA/MA)
- Occupations: Playwright, Actor, Producer
- Notable work: Celia: The Life and Music of Celia Cruz, La Gringa, La Lupe: My Life, My Destiny, La Caída de Rafael Trujillo
- Awards: OBIE Award, HOLA Award, ACE Award

Carmen Rivera (born October 1, 1964) is an American playwright, teacher, and producer. Working for over 20 years in the arts, she is best known for her play La Gringa (1996) and the musical Celia: The Life and Music of Celia Cruz (2007), which she co-wrote with playwright and husband Cándido Tirado.

Rivera's plays have opened and seen success off-broadway. Her work has appeared at INTAR, La MaMa Experimental Theatre Club (E.T.C.), the Theater for the New City, and other domestic theaters in cities across the United States. Her plays have also been produced internationally at theatre festivals in Moscow, Chile, Puerto Rico, Colombia, and Bolivia. She is a founding member and co-executive director of Educational Play Productions (E.P.P.).

== Biography ==
=== Early life and education ===
Rivera's parents were both born in Puerto Rico and came to the United States when they were about 8 years old. Rivera was born in New York City on October 1, 1964. Her parents, who learned English upon coming to the United States, did not teach Rivera Spanish and she did not learn the language until college. It was fluency in the language that allowed her to access the stories within her Spanish-speaking family.

Rivera holds a BA from New York University in economics and Latin American Literature. From a young age, Rivera loved to write and often took classes at the Puerto Rican Travelling Theatre. This led her to return to New York University to pursue her MA. She created her own course of study consisting of playwrighting, Latin American theatre, and educational theatre.

=== Professional career ===
Rivera has enjoyed both domestic and international success for many of her pieces. One of her first and most successful plays, La Gringa which has run Off Broadway for 28 consecutive years, explores the Rivera's own feelings regarding the Puerto Rican diaspora and her own feelings of duality as a New York-born Puerto Rican. Many of her other pieces reflect the Puerto Rican diaspora, a narrative she is personally interested in exploring.

In 2003, Rivera and husband Cándido Tirado founded Educational Play Productions, a production company that bring plays into New York Public Schools. They continue to serve as co-directors. Outside of her continued work as a playwright, Rivera is a Teacher Artist with the Manhattan Theatre Club, Arts Connections and Teachers and writers.

Rivera is also a member of the Dramatists Guild, the Theatre Communications Group, NALIP (the National Association of Latino Independent Producers) and Sigma Delta Pi (inducted June 1986).

== Plays ==
=== Off-broadway ===
La Gringa (1996): A play following a young woman in search of her identity. María Elena Garcia visits Puerto Rico in the hopes of reconnecting with her extended family and her homeland. Feeling like an American in Puerto Rico and like a Puerto Rican in America, Maria feels like she doesn't belong anywhere. The play is the longest running, off-broadway, Spanish-language play; it celebrated its 20th anniversary in 2016 and continues to be in repertory at Repertorio Español. La Gringa was awarded the OBIE Award (Off-Broadway Theater Award) in 1996.

"Rivera’s script is both a classic “fish out of water” tale and a glimpse into the relations of a particular, quirky family...La Gringa is akin to a sitcom, but more “Black-ish” or “Roseanne” than “Full House” – a show that’s funny but substantial, with respect for its characters and their struggles...A solid production from beginning to end, La Gringa is heartwarming but not sappy..." – Lauren Whalen, Chicago Theatre Beat

La Lupe: My Life, My Destiny (2001): A musical that explores the life and stardom of Cuban-born singer Guadalupe Victoria Yoli – La Lupe. The musical featured performances in both English and Spanish and was awarded the ACE Award from the Association of Journalists and writers for Best Production in 2001. The musical opened at the PRTT (Puerto Rican Traveling Theatre).

"Victoria Lupe Yoli was a poor kid from Cuba whose dad wanted her to be a teacher. But La Lupe could belt out a song like no one else. In Carmen Rivera's adept biodrama, we watch her rise from amateur contest winner to a six-year partnership with Tito Puente, sold-out performances in Carnegie Hall, and talk show stardom. There are 14 songs in all, but "La Lupe: My Life, My Destiny" is not a revue with a shoestring plot line. It's an inside look at fame and misfortune, the dramatic equivalent of a page turner. Rivera cleverly frames it with a Santería prophecy that the singer would enjoy more success than she ever dreamed before experiencing a terrible fall." – Glenda Frank, Backstage

Celia: The Life and Music of Celia Cruz (2007): Co-written by Rivera and her husband, Cándido Tirado. the musical is told through the voice of Celia Cruz's husband Pedro Knight. Celia takes the audience through the life and early beginnings of Celia Cruz through her music and has seen both off-Broadway national and international success in New York, Chicago, Miami, Tenerife and Puerto Rico. Celia received the HOLA Award in 2008.

=== Other works ===
Rivera has written several plays that have received recognition:

Year	Title	Details	Awards
1994	ameRICAN	Adapted into a 10-Minute video	Best Screenplay: College of Staten Island
1997	To Catch The Lightning	Opened at the Puerto Rican Traveling Theatre	Nominated for the ACE Award for Best Production Finalist in the Eugene O’Neill Playwrights Conference
1999	Julia de Burgos: Child of Water	Commissioned by Puerto Rican Traveling Theatre, N.Y.C. Videotaped for the Archives at the Lincoln Center Library for the Performing Arts.	
2014	La Caida de Rafael Trujillo	Commissioned by RMM Productions, opened at Teatro Circulo	ATI AWARD (Independent Theatre Artists): Best Production
2016	Riding the Bear	Draws parallels between the market crashes of 1987 and 2008	Honorable Mention on the Kilroy's 2016 list

In addition, she has authored or co-authored numerous works for her Educational Play Productions:

- The Next Stop (INTAR / Repertorio Español)
- Under The Mango Tree (INTAR)
- Ghosts in Brooklyn
- The Loves of our Lives
- The Next Cycle
- Betty’s Garage
- Delia’s Race
- Plastic Flowers
- The Power of Words

== Filmography ==
The screen adaptation of La Gringa was a finalist in the International Latino Film Festival/MTV Screenplay Competition in 2001.

== Honors and awards ==
- 1995 – 1996: Writing Fellowship New York Theatre Workshop
- 1995 – 1997: Van Lier Fellowship for New Dramatists
- 1997: Legacy Award for the Achievement in Playwriting from the Puerto Rican Traveling Theatre
- 1999: Lo Mejor de Nuestra Comunidad (The Best of Our Community) from Puerto Rican Cultural Organization, recognizing individuals who practice their craft in their community
