= Suzan-Lori Parks =

American playwright and screenwriter (born 1963)

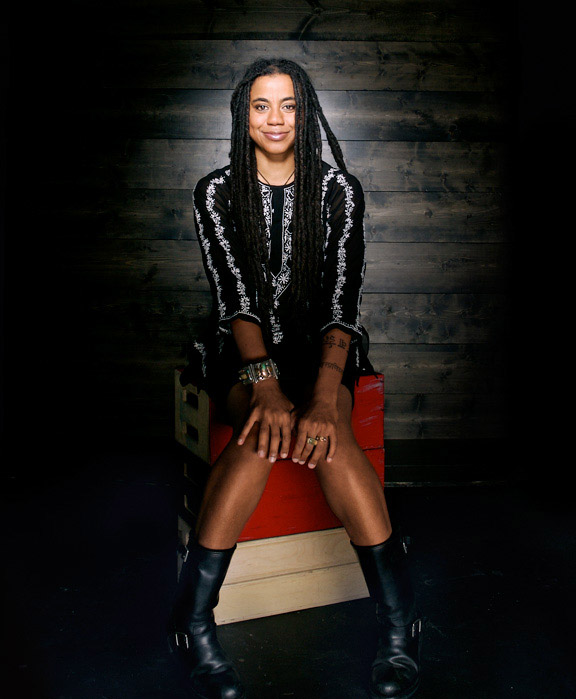
- Parks in 2006
- Born: May 10, 1963 (age 63); Fort Knox, Kentucky, U.S.
- Education: Mount Holyoke College (BA); Drama Studio London
- Occupations: playwright; librettist; screenwriter; novelist; professor
- Spouse(s): Paul Oscher (m. 2001; div. 2010) Christian Konopka (current)
- Children: 1
- Writing career
- Notable works: The America Play (1994); Venus (1996); In The Blood (1999); Fuckin A (2000); Topdog/Underdog (2001); White Noise (2019)
- Notable awards: Guggenheim Fellowship (2000); MacArthur Fellowship (2001); Pulitzer Prize for Drama (2003); The Dorothy and Lillian Gish Prize (2015); Windham–Campbell Literature Prize (2018); Obie Award (2019); Outer Critics Circle Award (2019); Tony Award (2023)
- Website: suzanloriparks.com

Suzan-Lori Parks (born May 10, 1963) is an American playwright, screenwriter, and novelist. Among her most popular plays are The America Play (1994), Venus (1996), In The Blood (1999), Fuckin A (2000), Topdog/Underdog (2001), and White Noise (2019). These works and others have been performed on and off Broadway and the West End.

Among numerous awards and honors, Parks is the recipient of MacArthur Fellowship, Guggenheim Fellowship, The Dorothy and Lillian Gish Prize, The Windham–Campbell Literature Prize, an Outer Critics Circle Award, an Obie Award, and two Tony Awards. In 2003 she became the first African-American woman to win the Pulitzer Prize for Drama.

Parks served as developer and showrunner for National Geographic series Genius: Aretha (2021), which was nominated for three Primetime Emmy Awards. Her screenwriting credits include Girl 6 (1996), Their Eyes Were Watching God (2005), Native Son (2019), and The United States vs. Billie Holiday (2021). Her work on these films has earned her an NAACP Image Award for Outstanding Writing in a Motion Picture (Television) and an Independent Spirit Award for Best First Screenplay nomination. In 2023 Time magazine named Parks one of the 100 Most Influential People in the World.

== Early life and education ==
Parks was born in Fort Knox, Kentucky. She grew up with two siblings in a military family. Parks enjoyed writing poems and songs and created a newspaper with her brother, called the "Daily Daily." Parks was raised Catholic and attended high school in West Germany, where her father, a career officer in the United States Army, was stationed. The experience showed her "what it feels like to be neither white nor black, but simply foreign". After returning to the U.S., her family relocated frequently and Parks went to school in Kentucky, Texas, California, North Carolina, Maryland, and Vermont. She graduated high school from The John Carroll School in 1981, while her father was stationed in Aberdeen Proving Ground.

In high school, Parks was discouraged from studying literature by at least one teacher, but upon reading Virginia Woolf's To the Lighthouse, Parks found herself veering away from her interest in chemistry, gravitating towards writing. Parks attended Mount Holyoke College and became a member of Phi Beta Kappa. She graduated in 1985 with a B.A. degree in English and German literature. She studied under James Baldwin, who encouraged her to become a playwright; Parks was initially resistant to writing for theater, believing it was elitist and cliquey. Parks, at his behest, began to write plays. Baldwin considered her talent as amazing. Parks then studied acting for a year at Drama Studio London.

Parks was inspired by Wendy Wasserstein, who won the Pulitzer in 1989 for her play The Heidi Chronicles, and by her Mount Holyoke professor, Leah Blatt Glasser.

== Career ==
Parks has written three screenplays and numerous stage plays. Her first screenplay was for Spike Lee's 1996 film Girl 6. She later worked with Oprah Winfrey's Harpo Productions on screenplays for Their Eyes Were Watching God (2005) and The Great Debaters (2007).

Parks became the first female African American to receive the Pulitzer Prize for Drama, which was awarded in 2002 for her play Topdog/Underdog. (Note: Gwendolyn Brooks was the first female African American to win any Pulitzer Prize, in 1950, for Poetry.) She has also received a number of grants including the MacArthur Foundation "Genius" Grant in 2001. She is a winner of the 2017 Poets, Essayists and Novelists (PEN) America Literary Awards in the category Master American Dramatist. She received the 2018 Steinberg Distinguished Playwright Award. This biennial award is given to "established playwrights whose body of work has made significant contributions to the American theatre."

=== Betting on the Dust Commander ===
Although Betting on the Dust Commander was not the first play Parks wrote, it was the first of her plays to be produced. Her first play The Sinner's Place, which she wrote for her senior project at Mount Holyoke, was rejected for production by her college's drama department as they considered it too experimental since she wanted to have dirt on the stage during the performance. When her second play, Betting on the Dust Commander, first premiered, it ran for three nights in a bar in Manhattan's Lower East Side called Gas Station. It is a short, one-act play set in Kentucky, centering around the lives of a couple, Mare and Lucius, who have been married for 110 years. The play's title comes from the horse that won the Kentucky Derby in 1970, Dust Commander. As the play goes on, we discover that Dust Commander's Derby is responsible for bringing Mare and Lucius together, and through the couple's discussion of him they think back over their many years of memories together. Poet Philip Kolin argues that Parks's incorporation of non-linear time and a repetitive style is reminiscent of African rituals and the way that their retelling of stories often incorporate the past in a literal manner.

=== Topdog/Underdog ===
One of her best-known works is Topdog/Underdog. This play marked a departure from the heightened language she usually wrote. Parks is an admirer of Abraham Lincoln and believed he left a legacy for descendants of slaves. It tells the story of two African-American brothers: Lincoln and Booth. Lincoln works at a boardwalk arcade, dressing up like Abraham Lincoln and letting the tourists shoot him with plastic guns. He got this job because he could be paid less than the white man who had the job before. Author Joshua Wolf Shenk argues that Parks does not judge Lincoln in this play, but rather enjoys bringing him into the other characters' lives and seeing how they are affected. In an interview, Parks said, "Lincoln is the closest thing we have to a mythic figure. In days of Greek drama, they had Apollo and Medea and Oedipus – these larger than life figures that walked the earth and spoke – and they turned them into plays. Shakespeare had kings and queens that he fashioned into his stories. Lincoln, to me, is one of those."

=== 365 Plays/365 Days ===
After her book Getting Mother's Body was published, Parks gave herself the task of writing 365 plays in 365 days, ultimately produced as 365 Plays/365 Days.

The plays were presented by 725 performing arts groups, taking turns until the entire cycle was performed. The performances started in 2006 at The Public Theater in New York City, and included venues such as the Denver Center Theatre Company, colleges in England and Australia and the Steel City Theatre Company in Pueblo, Colorado. Other venues were the Steppenwolf Theatre Company and the Goodman Theatre in Chicago, and the Center Theater Group in Los Angeles.

=== Father Comes Home From the Wars, Parts 1, 2 & 3 ===
Father Comes Home From the Wars (Parts 1, 2, & 3) premiered off-Broadway at the Public Theater in a developmental production in March 2014 and a full production that fall. Directed by Jo Bonney, the cast featured Sterling K. Brown, Louis Cancelmi, Peter Jay Fernandez, Russell G. Jones, and Jacob Ming-Trent. Jacob Ming-Trent won the 2015 Lucille Lortel Award for Outstanding Featured Actor in a Play and Parks won the 2015 Obie Award for playwriting presented by the American Theater Wing. The play, which takes place during the American Civil War, is presented in three parts: Part 1, A Measure of a Man; Part 2, The Battle in the Wilderness; and Part 3, The Union of My Confederate Parts. From September 15 to October 22, 2016, the play had its London premiere at the Royal Court in a transfer of the Public Theatre production directed by Jo Bonney. The cast featured Steve Toussaint, Nadine Marshall, Leo Wringer, Sibusiso Mamba, Tom Bateman, and Jimmy Akingbola.

The play was a finalist for the 2015 Pulitzer Prize for Drama. The Pulitzer committee wrote: "A distinctive and lyrical epic about a slave during the Civil War that deftly takes on questions of identity, power and freedom with a blend of humor and dignity."

=== The Red Letter Plays ===
The Red Letter Plays refers to Fucking A and In the Blood, two plays incorporating themes from The Scarlet Letter. Both plays have a mother named Hester struggling in a society where they put her in the role of outcast. The first play, In the Blood, premiered in 1999 and follows the story of Hester, a penniless mother of five who is condemned by the men who once loved her. In the Blood was a finalist for the 2000 Pulitzer Prize for Drama. Fucking A premiered in 2000 and tells the story of Hester, an "abortionist" trying to free her son from prison.

In 2017, Signature Theatre Company produced these two plays in the same season. Parks said: "They were conceived from the same idea but until now have lived very separate lives. I can't wait to participate in the dialogue that will come from witnessing these two works in concert."

=== Sally & Tom ===
In October 2022, Sally & Tom, a play about Thomas Jefferson and Sally Hemings, began performances at the Guthrie Theater in Minneapolis.

=== Plays for the Plague Year ===
Plays for the Plague Year, an anthology of plays and songs, described by The New York Times as "Parks's diaristic musings on the first year of the COVID-19 pandemic and a coincident string of deaths, including those of Black Americans killed by police officers", was scheduled for a November 2022 premiere at Joe's Pub, with Parks onstage singing and starring.

=== The Harder They Come ===
The Harder They Come, Parks's musical adaptation of the 1972 Jamaican reggae film was staged at the Public Theater in 2023.

== Works ==
=== Theatre ===
- The Sinner's Place (1984)
- Betting on the Dust Commander (1987)
- Imperceptible Mutabilities in the Third Kingdom (1989)
- The Death of the Last Black Man in the Whole Entire World A.K.A. The Negro Book Of The Dead (1989–1992)
- Pickling (1990) (radio play)
- Third Kingdom (1990) (radio play)
- Locomotive (1991) (radio play)
- Devotees in the Garden of Love (1992)
- The America Play (1994)
- Venus (1996)
- In The Blood (1999)
- Fucking A (2000)
- Topdog/Underdog (2001)
- 365 Days/365 Plays (2002–2003)
- Unchain My Heart (The Ray Charles Musical) (2007)
- The Book of Grace (2010)
- Porgy and Bess (2011) (Book Adaptation)
- Father Comes Home From the Wars (Parts 1, 2, & 3) (2014)
- White Noise (2019) (winner, 2019 Obie Award, Playwriting)
- Sally & Tom (2022)
- The Harder They Come (2023)

=== Screenplays ===
- Girl 6 (1996) (film)
- Their Eyes Were Watching God (2005) (film)
- Native Son (2019) (film)
- The United States vs. Billie Holiday (2021) (film)
- Genius: Aretha (2021) (TV series)

=== Essays ===
- "Possession." In The America Play and Other Works, 3–5. New York: Theatre Communications Group, 1995.
- "From the Elements of Style". In The America Play and Other Works, 6–18. New York: Theatre Communications Group, 1995.
- "An Equation for Black People Onstage". In The America Play and Other Works, 19–22. New York: Theatre Communications Group, 1995.
- "Tradition and the Individual Talent". Theater 29.2 (1999): 26–33.
- "Commencement Speech to the Mount Holyoke College Class of 2001". Mount Holyoke College. May 27, 2001.
- "Suzan-Lori Parks's Aha! Moment". May 2003. Archived from the original on January 13, 2008.

=== Novels ===
- Getting Mother's Body (2003)

== Recognition ==
- 1990: Obie Award Best New American Play – Imperceptible Mutabilities in the Third Kingdom
- 1992: Whiting Award
- 1995: Lila-Wallace Reader's Digest Award
- 1996: Obie Award for Playwriting – Venus
- 2000: Guggenheim Fellowship Playwriting
- 2000: Pulitzer Prize Drama finalist – In The Blood
- 2001: MacArthur Foundation "Genius" Grant
- 2002: Pulitzer Prize for Drama – Topdog/Underdog
- 2002: Drama Desk Award Outstanding New Play nomination – Topdog/Underdog
- 2002: Tony Award for Best Play nomination – Topdog/Underdog
- 2006: Eugene McDermott Award in the Arts from the Council for the Arts at MIT (CAMIT)
- 2006 Henry Award for Outstanding New Play for The War Anthology
- 2007: Academy of Achievement Golden Plate Award
- 2008: NAACP Theatre Award - Ray Charles Live! A New Musical
- 2015: Edward M. Kennedy Prize for Drama Inspired by American History - Father Comes Home From the Wars (Parts 1, 2, & 3)
- 2015: Dorothy and Lillian Gish Prize
- 2015: Lucille Lortel Outstanding Play Award nomination - Father Comes Home From the Wars (Parts 1, 2, & 3)
- 2015: Pulitzer Prize Drama finalist - Father Comes Home From the Wars (Parts 1, 2, & 3)
- 2017: PEN/Laura Pels International Foundation for Theater Awards for Master American Dramatist
- 2018: Windham–Campbell Literature Prize in Drama
- 2019: Outer Critics Circle Award, Outstanding New Off-Broadway Play — White Noise
- 2023: Tony Award for Best Revival of a Play -Topdog/Underdog
- 2024: Royal Society of Literature International Writer

== Personal life ==
In 2001, Parks married blues musician Paul Oscher; they divorced in 2010. By 2017, she married Christian Konopka, with whom she has a child.

Parks noted in an interview that her name is spelled with a "Z" as the result of a misprint early in her career:

When I was doing one of my first plays in the East Village, we had fliers printed up and they spelled my name wrong. I was devastated. But the director said, 'Just keep it, honey, and it will be fine.' And it was.

She teaches playwriting at Tisch School of the Arts in the Rita & Burton Goldberg Department of Dramatic Writing.

In 2011, Parks was the Master Writer Chair of The Public Theater, where she debuted a performance piece called Watch Me Work, in which she worked on her newest writing project in the theater's lobby, as part of the 2011 Under the Radar Festival. She was the 2013 Waldman Chair Visiting Artist at Emerson College, where she held another performance of Watch Me Work in the Randall Lobby of Emerson's Paramount Center.

== See also ==
- African-American Tony nominees and winners
